= List of minor planets: 568001–569000 =

The following is a partial list of minor planets, running from minor-planet number 568001 through 569000, inclusive. The primary data for this and other partial lists is based on JPL's "Small-Body Orbital Elements" and data available from the Minor Planet Center. Critical list information is also provided by the MPC, unless otherwise specified from Lowell Observatory. A detailed description of the table's columns and additional sources are given on the main page including a complete list of every page in this series, and a statistical break-up on the dynamical classification of minor planets.

Also see the summary list of all named bodies in numerical and alphabetical order, and the corresponding naming citations for the number range of this particular list. New namings may only be added to this list after official publication, as the preannouncement of names is condemned by the Working Group for Small Bodies Nomenclature of the International Astronomical Union.

| Near-Earth obj. | MBA (inner) | MBA (outer) | Centaur |
| Mars-crosser | MBA (middle) | Jupiter trojan | Trans-Neptunian obj. |
| Unclassified |

== 568001–568100 ==
| Designation | | | Discovery | | | Properties | | Ref |
| Permanent | Provisional | Named after | Date | Site | Discoverer(s) | Category | Diam. | Ref |
|---|---|---|---|---|---|---|---|---|
| 568001 | 2003 GQ_{58} | — | November 5, 2005 | Mount Lemmon | Mount Lemmon Survey | · | 3.1 km | MPC · JPL |
| 568002 | 2003 GU_{58} | — | August 23, 2014 | Haleakala | Pan-STARRS 1 | BAR | 980 m | MPC · JPL |
| 568003 | 2003 GF_{59} | — | April 9, 2010 | Mount Lemmon | Mount Lemmon Survey | · | 660 m | MPC · JPL |
| 568004 | 2003 GJ_{59} | — | April 22, 2007 | Kitt Peak | Spacewatch | · | 1.2 km | MPC · JPL |
| 568005 | 2003 GQ_{59} | — | September 7, 2011 | Kitt Peak | Spacewatch | EOS | 1.6 km | MPC · JPL |
| 568006 | 2003 GD_{60} | — | October 1, 2011 | Kitt Peak | Spacewatch | · | 2.5 km | MPC · JPL |
| 568007 | 2003 GG_{61} | — | April 4, 2003 | Kitt Peak | Spacewatch | · | 1.2 km | MPC · JPL |
| 568008 | 2003 GX_{61} | — | November 11, 2006 | Kitt Peak | Spacewatch | (1298) | 2.3 km | MPC · JPL |
| 568009 | 2003 GZ_{61} | — | October 6, 2012 | Haleakala | Pan-STARRS 1 | · | 2.7 km | MPC · JPL |
| 568010 | 2003 GD_{63} | — | April 1, 2003 | Apache Point | SDSS Collaboration | · | 2.3 km | MPC · JPL |
| 568011 | 2003 GJ_{63} | — | December 22, 2005 | Kitt Peak | Spacewatch | · | 570 m | MPC · JPL |
| 568012 | 2003 GL_{63} | — | February 11, 2016 | Haleakala | Pan-STARRS 1 | · | 1.6 km | MPC · JPL |
| 568013 | 2003 GW_{64} | — | March 18, 2009 | Mount Lemmon | Mount Lemmon Survey | · | 2.3 km | MPC · JPL |
| 568014 | 2003 GT_{65} | — | March 28, 2014 | Mount Lemmon | Mount Lemmon Survey | · | 2.3 km | MPC · JPL |
| 568015 | 2003 GY_{65} | — | April 11, 2003 | Kitt Peak | Spacewatch | · | 1.0 km | MPC · JPL |
| 568016 | 2003 HZ_{17} | — | April 25, 2003 | Kitt Peak | Spacewatch | · | 2.9 km | MPC · JPL |
| 568017 | 2003 HQ_{18} | — | April 25, 2003 | Kitt Peak | Spacewatch | · | 1.4 km | MPC · JPL |
| 568018 | 2003 HP_{21} | — | April 26, 2003 | Haleakala | NEAT | JUN | 1.1 km | MPC · JPL |
| 568019 | 2003 HF_{25} | — | April 4, 2003 | Kitt Peak | Spacewatch | TIR | 2.7 km | MPC · JPL |
| 568020 | 2003 HR_{57} | — | March 26, 1996 | Kitt Peak | Spacewatch | NYS | 960 m | MPC · JPL |
| 568021 | 2003 HJ_{59} | — | February 9, 2008 | Kitt Peak | Spacewatch | · | 2.6 km | MPC · JPL |
| 568022 | 2003 HK_{59} | — | May 17, 2009 | Mount Lemmon | Mount Lemmon Survey | VER | 2.8 km | MPC · JPL |
| 568023 | 2003 HR_{59} | — | November 16, 2006 | Mount Lemmon | Mount Lemmon Survey | · | 2.7 km | MPC · JPL |
| 568024 | 2003 HC_{60} | — | April 28, 2003 | Kitt Peak | Spacewatch | · | 3.0 km | MPC · JPL |
| 568025 | 2003 HE_{60} | — | April 8, 2014 | Kitt Peak | Spacewatch | · | 2.1 km | MPC · JPL |
| 568026 | 2003 HS_{60} | — | June 5, 2014 | Haleakala | Pan-STARRS 1 | · | 620 m | MPC · JPL |
| 568027 | 2003 HV_{60} | — | August 25, 2014 | Haleakala | Pan-STARRS 1 | · | 600 m | MPC · JPL |
| 568028 | 2003 HG_{61} | — | May 7, 2014 | Haleakala | Pan-STARRS 1 | · | 650 m | MPC · JPL |
| 568029 | 2003 HJ_{61} | — | October 24, 2013 | Mount Lemmon | Mount Lemmon Survey | · | 1.4 km | MPC · JPL |
| 568030 | 2003 HW_{61} | — | September 1, 2013 | Mount Lemmon | Mount Lemmon Survey | · | 1.3 km | MPC · JPL |
| 568031 | 2003 HZ_{62} | — | October 21, 2011 | Kitt Peak | Spacewatch | V | 600 m | MPC · JPL |
| 568032 | 2003 HU_{63} | — | January 12, 2018 | Mount Lemmon | Mount Lemmon Survey | · | 2.2 km | MPC · JPL |
| 568033 | 2003 HT_{64} | — | June 1, 2009 | Mount Lemmon | Mount Lemmon Survey | · | 2.4 km | MPC · JPL |
| 568034 | 2003 HW_{64} | — | November 18, 2017 | Haleakala | Pan-STARRS 1 | · | 2.4 km | MPC · JPL |
| 568035 | 2003 HZ_{64} | — | April 1, 2016 | Haleakala | Pan-STARRS 1 | · | 1.7 km | MPC · JPL |
| 568036 | 2003 HD_{65} | — | January 21, 2015 | Catalina | CSS | · | 1.1 km | MPC · JPL |
| 568037 | 2003 JA_{8} | — | May 2, 2003 | Socorro | LINEAR | · | 1.8 km | MPC · JPL |
| 568038 | 2003 JY_{18} | — | April 9, 2014 | Mount Lemmon | Mount Lemmon Survey | · | 3.4 km | MPC · JPL |
| 568039 | 2003 JC_{19} | — | May 1, 2003 | Kitt Peak | Spacewatch | HNS | 1.3 km | MPC · JPL |
| 568040 | 2003 JD_{19} | — | September 9, 2007 | Kitt Peak | Spacewatch | V | 580 m | MPC · JPL |
| 568041 | 2003 JL_{19} | — | September 30, 2005 | Mount Lemmon | Mount Lemmon Survey | EUN | 1.1 km | MPC · JPL |
| 568042 | 2003 JW_{19} | — | November 3, 2005 | Kitt Peak | Spacewatch | EOS | 1.9 km | MPC · JPL |
| 568043 | 2003 JZ_{19} | — | February 20, 2014 | Mount Lemmon | Mount Lemmon Survey | · | 1.2 km | MPC · JPL |
| 568044 | 2003 JZ_{20} | — | May 3, 2003 | Kitt Peak | Spacewatch | TIR | 2.2 km | MPC · JPL |
| 568045 | 2003 KW_{8} | — | April 28, 2003 | Kitt Peak | Spacewatch | · | 2.0 km | MPC · JPL |
| 568046 | 2003 KU_{17} | — | May 27, 2003 | Nogales | P. R. Holvorcem, M. Schwartz | · | 1.2 km | MPC · JPL |
| 568047 | 2003 KN_{20} | — | May 27, 2003 | Mauna Kea | Pittichová, J. | · | 2.4 km | MPC · JPL |
| 568048 | 2003 KZ_{28} | — | May 22, 2003 | Kitt Peak | Spacewatch | · | 1.3 km | MPC · JPL |
| 568049 | 2003 KM_{37} | — | July 2, 2010 | WISE | WISE | · | 2.6 km | MPC · JPL |
| 568050 | 2003 KN_{37} | — | January 10, 2013 | Haleakala | Pan-STARRS 1 | · | 750 m | MPC · JPL |
| 568051 | 2003 KU_{37} | — | October 18, 2011 | Mount Lemmon | Mount Lemmon Survey | · | 2.5 km | MPC · JPL |
| 568052 | 2003 KX_{37} | — | December 21, 2006 | Mount Lemmon | Mount Lemmon Survey | · | 3.3 km | MPC · JPL |
| 568053 | 2003 KD_{38} | — | August 28, 2014 | Haleakala | Pan-STARRS 1 | · | 630 m | MPC · JPL |
| 568054 | 2003 KG_{38} | — | January 3, 2012 | Mount Lemmon | Mount Lemmon Survey | · | 1.7 km | MPC · JPL |
| 568055 | 2003 KJ_{38} | — | December 22, 2008 | Kitt Peak | Spacewatch | · | 670 m | MPC · JPL |
| 568056 | 2003 KO_{38} | — | May 4, 2014 | Mount Lemmon | Mount Lemmon Survey | VER | 2.9 km | MPC · JPL |
| 568057 | 2003 KU_{38} | — | September 17, 2017 | Haleakala | Pan-STARRS 1 | · | 3.0 km | MPC · JPL |
| 568058 | 2003 KV_{38} | — | October 23, 2011 | Haleakala | Pan-STARRS 1 | · | 730 m | MPC · JPL |
| 568059 | 2003 KC_{39} | — | November 18, 2014 | Mount Lemmon | Mount Lemmon Survey | EUN | 1.1 km | MPC · JPL |
| 568060 | 2003 KD_{39} | — | May 28, 2014 | Haleakala | Pan-STARRS 1 | · | 2.3 km | MPC · JPL |
| 568061 | 2003 KH_{39} | — | October 18, 2009 | Mount Lemmon | Mount Lemmon Survey | · | 1.4 km | MPC · JPL |
| 568062 | 2003 KS_{39} | — | January 18, 2013 | Mount Lemmon | Mount Lemmon Survey | · | 2.8 km | MPC · JPL |
| 568063 | 2003 LE | — | June 1, 2003 | Kitt Peak | Spacewatch | · | 3.3 km | MPC · JPL |
| 568064 | 2003 LW_{9} | — | June 18, 2015 | Haleakala | Pan-STARRS 1 | · | 2.5 km | MPC · JPL |
| 568065 | 2003 LY_{9} | — | November 10, 2013 | Mount Lemmon | Mount Lemmon Survey | · | 1.5 km | MPC · JPL |
| 568066 | 2003 LH_{10} | — | February 3, 2016 | Haleakala | Pan-STARRS 1 | · | 880 m | MPC · JPL |
| 568067 | 2003 LX_{10} | — | March 30, 2011 | Mount Lemmon | Mount Lemmon Survey | · | 1.7 km | MPC · JPL |
| 568068 | 2003 LT_{11} | — | January 26, 2006 | Mount Lemmon | Mount Lemmon Survey | AGN | 1.1 km | MPC · JPL |
| 568069 | 2003 MC_{4} | — | June 26, 2003 | Nogales | P. R. Holvorcem, M. Schwartz | JUN | 910 m | MPC · JPL |
| 568070 | 2003 MG_{13} | — | January 1, 2016 | Haleakala | Pan-STARRS 1 | H | 520 m | MPC · JPL |
| 568071 | 2003 MH_{13} | — | July 14, 2016 | Haleakala | Pan-STARRS 1 | · | 3.2 km | MPC · JPL |
| 568072 | 2003 NU_{10} | — | July 3, 2003 | Kitt Peak | Spacewatch | V | 520 m | MPC · JPL |
| 568073 | 2003 NH_{12} | — | July 3, 2003 | Kitt Peak | Spacewatch | · | 1.9 km | MPC · JPL |
| 568074 | 2003 NY_{13} | — | April 25, 2007 | Mount Lemmon | Mount Lemmon Survey | · | 1.0 km | MPC · JPL |
| 568075 | 2003 NO_{14} | — | February 24, 2014 | Haleakala | Pan-STARRS 1 | PHO | 930 m | MPC · JPL |
| 568076 | 2003 NP_{14} | — | March 11, 2008 | Kitt Peak | Spacewatch | · | 2.1 km | MPC · JPL |
| 568077 | 2003 NC_{15} | — | January 21, 2013 | Haleakala | Pan-STARRS 1 | · | 1.1 km | MPC · JPL |
| 568078 | 2003 ND_{15} | — | January 2, 2012 | Mount Lemmon | Mount Lemmon Survey | ELF | 3.0 km | MPC · JPL |
| 568079 | 2003 ON_{13} | — | July 10, 2003 | Haleakala | NEAT | · | 2.2 km | MPC · JPL |
| 568080 | 2003 OL_{21} | — | July 28, 2003 | Campo Imperatore | CINEOS | NYS | 810 m | MPC · JPL |
| 568081 | 2003 OW_{23} | — | July 25, 2003 | Palomar | NEAT | · | 970 m | MPC · JPL |
| 568082 | 2003 OU_{25} | — | July 25, 2003 | Palomar | NEAT | · | 780 m | MPC · JPL |
| 568083 | 2003 OH_{33} | — | August 4, 2003 | Socorro | LINEAR | · | 1.1 km | MPC · JPL |
| 568084 | 2003 ON_{34} | — | December 11, 2004 | Kitt Peak | Spacewatch | AEO | 1 km | MPC · JPL |
| 568085 | 2003 OO_{35} | — | May 8, 2008 | Mount Lemmon | Mount Lemmon Survey | · | 2.8 km | MPC · JPL |
| 568086 | 2003 PX_{2} | — | August 2, 2003 | Haleakala | NEAT | · | 590 m | MPC · JPL |
| 568087 | 2003 PJ_{13} | — | September 24, 2008 | Kitt Peak | Spacewatch | NEM | 1.7 km | MPC · JPL |
| 568088 | 2003 QX_{10} | — | July 8, 2003 | Palomar | NEAT | · | 1.1 km | MPC · JPL |
| 568089 | 2003 QR_{87} | — | August 25, 2003 | Socorro | LINEAR | · | 540 m | MPC · JPL |
| 568090 | 2003 QK_{88} | — | August 26, 2003 | Socorro | LINEAR | · | 2.1 km | MPC · JPL |
| 568091 | 2003 QH_{98} | — | August 30, 2003 | Kitt Peak | Spacewatch | · | 1.4 km | MPC · JPL |
| 568092 Alexschmid | 2003 QF_{117} | Alexschmid | August 29, 2003 | Mauna Kea | D. D. Balam | · | 2.1 km | MPC · JPL |
| 568093 | 2003 QJ_{117} | — | February 25, 2006 | Kitt Peak | Spacewatch | · | 2.1 km | MPC · JPL |
| 568094 | 2003 QM_{120} | — | August 23, 2003 | Palomar | NEAT | · | 1.9 km | MPC · JPL |
| 568095 | 2003 QP_{120} | — | August 28, 2003 | Palomar | NEAT | RAF | 800 m | MPC · JPL |
| 568096 | 2003 QW_{120} | — | November 5, 2013 | Haleakala | Pan-STARRS 1 | · | 2.5 km | MPC · JPL |
| 568097 | 2003 QR_{121} | — | August 25, 2003 | Cerro Tololo | Deep Ecliptic Survey | · | 1.3 km | MPC · JPL |
| 568098 | 2003 QS_{121} | — | February 28, 2012 | Haleakala | Pan-STARRS 1 | · | 490 m | MPC · JPL |
| 568099 | 2003 QT_{121} | — | December 21, 2014 | Mount Lemmon | Mount Lemmon Survey | · | 590 m | MPC · JPL |
| 568100 | 2003 QJ_{122} | — | February 18, 2015 | Haleakala | Pan-STARRS 1 | · | 1.8 km | MPC · JPL |

== 568101–568200 ==
back to top

| Designation | | | Discovery | | | Properties | | Ref |
| Permanent | Provisional | Named after | Date | Site | Discoverer(s) | Category | Diam. | Ref |
|---|---|---|---|---|---|---|---|---|
| 568101 | 2003 QY_{122} | — | November 30, 2016 | Mount Lemmon | Mount Lemmon Survey | · | 1.2 km | MPC · JPL |
| 568102 | 2003 QD_{123} | — | September 7, 2008 | Mount Lemmon | Mount Lemmon Survey | · | 1.4 km | MPC · JPL |
| 568103 | 2003 QY_{124} | — | August 22, 2003 | Campo Imperatore | CINEOS | · | 1.1 km | MPC · JPL |
| 568104 | 2003 QH_{125} | — | October 24, 2003 | Kitt Peak | Deep Ecliptic Survey | · | 780 m | MPC · JPL |
| 568105 | 2003 RZ_{8} | — | September 1, 2003 | Socorro | LINEAR | · | 1.8 km | MPC · JPL |
| 568106 | 2003 RR_{24} | — | August 28, 2003 | Palomar | NEAT | · | 2.1 km | MPC · JPL |
| 568107 | 2003 RY_{27} | — | September 4, 2003 | Kitt Peak | Spacewatch | · | 1.0 km | MPC · JPL |
| 568108 | 2003 RJ_{28} | — | March 9, 2007 | Mount Lemmon | Mount Lemmon Survey | · | 2.2 km | MPC · JPL |
| 568109 | 2003 RK_{28} | — | October 6, 2008 | Mount Lemmon | Mount Lemmon Survey | · | 1.6 km | MPC · JPL |
| 568110 | 2003 RM_{28} | — | August 23, 2003 | Cerro Tololo | Deep Ecliptic Survey | · | 1.5 km | MPC · JPL |
| 568111 | 2003 RQ_{28} | — | October 20, 2007 | Mount Lemmon | Mount Lemmon Survey | · | 730 m | MPC · JPL |
| 568112 | 2003 RU_{28} | — | September 5, 2003 | Siding Spring | R. H. McNaught, G. J. Garradd | JUN | 740 m | MPC · JPL |
| 568113 | 2003 SK_{9} | — | September 17, 2003 | Kitt Peak | Spacewatch | · | 1.7 km | MPC · JPL |
| 568114 | 2003 SD_{20} | — | September 16, 2003 | Kitt Peak | Spacewatch | MAS | 750 m | MPC · JPL |
| 568115 | 2003 SR_{29} | — | September 18, 2003 | Palomar | NEAT | HNS | 1.3 km | MPC · JPL |
| 568116 | 2003 SK_{43} | — | August 23, 2003 | Palomar | NEAT | · | 1.1 km | MPC · JPL |
| 568117 | 2003 SD_{78} | — | September 19, 2003 | Kitt Peak | Spacewatch | · | 2.0 km | MPC · JPL |
| 568118 | 2003 SE_{110} | — | September 21, 2003 | Socorro | LINEAR | · | 2.7 km | MPC · JPL |
| 568119 | 2003 SM_{112} | — | September 16, 2003 | Kitt Peak | Spacewatch | · | 1.7 km | MPC · JPL |
| 568120 | 2003 SU_{130} | — | September 20, 2003 | Kitt Peak | Spacewatch | WAT | 1.4 km | MPC · JPL |
| 568121 | 2003 SO_{132} | — | September 19, 2003 | Kitt Peak | Spacewatch | AST | 1.4 km | MPC · JPL |
| 568122 | 2003 ST_{132} | — | September 19, 2003 | Kitt Peak | Spacewatch | · | 750 m | MPC · JPL |
| 568123 | 2003 SA_{158} | — | August 24, 2003 | Cerro Tololo | Deep Ecliptic Survey | · | 3.7 km | MPC · JPL |
| 568124 | 2003 SA_{186} | — | September 16, 2003 | Kitt Peak | Spacewatch | EUN | 930 m | MPC · JPL |
| 568125 | 2003 SJ_{186} | — | August 28, 2003 | Socorro | LINEAR | · | 1.7 km | MPC · JPL |
| 568126 | 2003 SF_{193} | — | September 20, 2003 | Palomar | NEAT | 615 | 1.5 km | MPC · JPL |
| 568127 | 2003 SO_{231} | — | September 18, 2003 | Socorro | LINEAR | · | 1.3 km | MPC · JPL |
| 568128 | 2003 SU_{239} | — | September 18, 2003 | Kitt Peak | Spacewatch | · | 1.9 km | MPC · JPL |
| 568129 | 2003 SB_{248} | — | September 18, 2003 | Palomar | NEAT | · | 1.7 km | MPC · JPL |
| 568130 | 2003 SO_{254} | — | September 27, 2003 | Kitt Peak | Spacewatch | · | 2.0 km | MPC · JPL |
| 568131 | 2003 SH_{257} | — | September 18, 2003 | Kitt Peak | Spacewatch | · | 1.6 km | MPC · JPL |
| 568132 | 2003 SM_{263} | — | September 28, 2003 | Socorro | LINEAR | MAS | 580 m | MPC · JPL |
| 568133 | 2003 SQ_{278} | — | September 20, 2003 | Palomar | NEAT | · | 1.1 km | MPC · JPL |
| 568134 | 2003 SX_{291} | — | September 20, 2003 | Palomar | NEAT | · | 2.9 km | MPC · JPL |
| 568135 | 2003 SY_{291} | — | September 20, 2003 | Palomar | NEAT | · | 2.5 km | MPC · JPL |
| 568136 | 2003 SA_{296} | — | October 1, 2003 | Kitt Peak | Spacewatch | EUN | 860 m | MPC · JPL |
| 568137 | 2003 SW_{298} | — | September 20, 2003 | Socorro | LINEAR | · | 2.3 km | MPC · JPL |
| 568138 | 2003 SG_{303} | — | September 20, 2003 | Palomar | NEAT | · | 1.8 km | MPC · JPL |
| 568139 | 2003 SV_{315} | — | September 21, 2003 | Kitt Peak | Spacewatch | · | 2.0 km | MPC · JPL |
| 568140 | 2003 SO_{324} | — | September 17, 2003 | Kitt Peak | Spacewatch | · | 840 m | MPC · JPL |
| 568141 | 2003 SY_{324} | — | September 18, 2003 | Socorro | LINEAR | NYS | 1.1 km | MPC · JPL |
| 568142 | 2003 SM_{325} | — | September 28, 2003 | Socorro | LINEAR | · | 960 m | MPC · JPL |
| 568143 | 2003 SX_{329} | — | September 30, 2003 | Kitt Peak | Spacewatch | · | 1.7 km | MPC · JPL |
| 568144 | 2003 SC_{331} | — | October 20, 2003 | Kitt Peak | Spacewatch | · | 1.5 km | MPC · JPL |
| 568145 | 2003 SL_{334} | — | September 27, 2003 | Kitt Peak | Spacewatch | · | 960 m | MPC · JPL |
| 568146 | 2003 SF_{335} | — | September 28, 2003 | Anderson Mesa | LONEOS | · | 910 m | MPC · JPL |
| 568147 | 2003 SX_{335} | — | September 26, 2003 | Apache Point | SDSS Collaboration | · | 650 m | MPC · JPL |
| 568148 | 2003 SJ_{339} | — | October 23, 2003 | Kitt Peak | Spacewatch | · | 770 m | MPC · JPL |
| 568149 | 2003 SS_{339} | — | September 26, 2003 | Apache Point | SDSS Collaboration | · | 1.4 km | MPC · JPL |
| 568150 | 2003 SZ_{345} | — | September 18, 2003 | Palomar | NEAT | · | 1.6 km | MPC · JPL |
| 568151 | 2003 SW_{346} | — | September 18, 2003 | Kitt Peak | Spacewatch | HOF | 1.8 km | MPC · JPL |
| 568152 | 2003 SD_{353} | — | September 20, 2003 | Socorro | LINEAR | · | 940 m | MPC · JPL |
| 568153 | 2003 SZ_{355} | — | September 16, 2003 | Kitt Peak | Spacewatch | · | 1.8 km | MPC · JPL |
| 568154 | 2003 SN_{356} | — | September 18, 2003 | Kitt Peak | Spacewatch | · | 540 m | MPC · JPL |
| 568155 | 2003 SP_{356} | — | September 18, 2003 | Kitt Peak | Spacewatch | H | 410 m | MPC · JPL |
| 568156 | 2003 SF_{368} | — | September 26, 2003 | Apache Point | SDSS Collaboration | KOR | 1.0 km | MPC · JPL |
| 568157 | 2003 SZ_{368} | — | September 26, 2003 | Apache Point | SDSS Collaboration | · | 1.5 km | MPC · JPL |
| 568158 | 2003 SQ_{375} | — | September 18, 2003 | Kitt Peak | Spacewatch | · | 720 m | MPC · JPL |
| 568159 | 2003 SR_{376} | — | September 26, 2003 | Apache Point | SDSS Collaboration | · | 2.4 km | MPC · JPL |
| 568160 | 2003 SX_{376} | — | September 26, 2003 | Apache Point | SDSS Collaboration | BRA | 1.1 km | MPC · JPL |
| 568161 | 2003 SA_{378} | — | September 18, 2003 | Kitt Peak | Spacewatch | HOF | 2.1 km | MPC · JPL |
| 568162 | 2003 SD_{378} | — | September 26, 2003 | Apache Point | SDSS Collaboration | · | 540 m | MPC · JPL |
| 568163 | 2003 SK_{381} | — | September 26, 2003 | Apache Point | SDSS Collaboration | AGN | 820 m | MPC · JPL |
| 568164 | 2003 SA_{383} | — | September 26, 2003 | Apache Point | SDSS Collaboration | AGN | 900 m | MPC · JPL |
| 568165 | 2003 SF_{384} | — | September 30, 2003 | Kitt Peak | Spacewatch | AEO | 960 m | MPC · JPL |
| 568166 | 2003 SF_{387} | — | October 2, 2003 | Kitt Peak | Spacewatch | · | 1.9 km | MPC · JPL |
| 568167 | 2003 SE_{389} | — | February 4, 2005 | Kitt Peak | Spacewatch | · | 750 m | MPC · JPL |
| 568168 | 2003 SE_{390} | — | September 26, 2003 | Apache Point | SDSS Collaboration | AGN | 1.2 km | MPC · JPL |
| 568169 | 2003 SN_{391} | — | September 26, 2003 | Apache Point | SDSS Collaboration | · | 1.7 km | MPC · JPL |
| 568170 | 2003 SV_{392} | — | September 26, 2003 | Apache Point | SDSS Collaboration | · | 2.2 km | MPC · JPL |
| 568171 | 2003 SB_{394} | — | September 26, 2003 | Apache Point | SDSS Collaboration | · | 1.6 km | MPC · JPL |
| 568172 | 2003 SH_{395} | — | October 20, 2003 | Kitt Peak | Spacewatch | · | 660 m | MPC · JPL |
| 568173 | 2003 SO_{396} | — | September 26, 2003 | Apache Point | SDSS Collaboration | · | 2.0 km | MPC · JPL |
| 568174 | 2003 SY_{398} | — | September 26, 2003 | Apache Point | SDSS | · | 1.6 km | MPC · JPL |
| 568175 | 2003 SV_{403} | — | September 27, 2003 | Apache Point | SDSS Collaboration | (895) | 2.2 km | MPC · JPL |
| 568176 | 2003 SC_{404} | — | October 22, 2003 | Anderson Mesa | LONEOS | · | 2.0 km | MPC · JPL |
| 568177 | 2003 SA_{406} | — | September 27, 2003 | Apache Point | SDSS Collaboration | GEF | 920 m | MPC · JPL |
| 568178 | 2003 SH_{410} | — | September 28, 2003 | Kitt Peak | Spacewatch | · | 1.6 km | MPC · JPL |
| 568179 | 2003 SV_{410} | — | September 28, 2003 | Kitt Peak | Spacewatch | AST | 1.3 km | MPC · JPL |
| 568180 | 2003 SY_{414} | — | September 29, 2003 | Kitt Peak | Spacewatch | · | 460 m | MPC · JPL |
| 568181 | 2003 SX_{417} | — | September 28, 2003 | Apache Point | SDSS Collaboration | · | 1.3 km | MPC · JPL |
| 568182 | 2003 SU_{421} | — | October 5, 2003 | Kitt Peak | Spacewatch | MRX | 1.0 km | MPC · JPL |
| 568183 | 2003 SF_{425} | — | September 25, 2003 | Mauna Kea | Mauna Kea | KOR | 850 m | MPC · JPL |
| 568184 | 2003 SE_{432} | — | September 18, 2003 | Kitt Peak | Spacewatch | · | 1.7 km | MPC · JPL |
| 568185 | 2003 SN_{435} | — | September 20, 2003 | Palomar | NEAT | · | 1.9 km | MPC · JPL |
| 568186 | 2003 SS_{435} | — | September 22, 2003 | Palomar | NEAT | · | 860 m | MPC · JPL |
| 568187 | 2003 SJ_{436} | — | September 26, 2003 | Apache Point | SDSS Collaboration | GEF | 1.3 km | MPC · JPL |
| 568188 | 2003 SM_{436} | — | October 10, 2008 | Mount Lemmon | Mount Lemmon Survey | · | 2.1 km | MPC · JPL |
| 568189 | 2003 SR_{436} | — | September 18, 2003 | Kitt Peak | Spacewatch | · | 1.8 km | MPC · JPL |
| 568190 | 2003 ST_{436} | — | September 18, 2003 | Kitt Peak | Spacewatch | NYS | 1.0 km | MPC · JPL |
| 568191 | 2003 SN_{437} | — | October 1, 2008 | Kitt Peak | Spacewatch | AGN | 1.0 km | MPC · JPL |
| 568192 | 2003 SP_{437} | — | July 31, 2014 | Haleakala | Pan-STARRS 1 | · | 1.0 km | MPC · JPL |
| 568193 | 2003 SS_{437} | — | September 27, 2008 | Mount Lemmon | Mount Lemmon Survey | · | 1.6 km | MPC · JPL |
| 568194 | 2003 SV_{437} | — | September 29, 2003 | Kitt Peak | Spacewatch | · | 2.1 km | MPC · JPL |
| 568195 | 2003 SX_{437} | — | September 18, 2003 | Kitt Peak | Spacewatch | · | 1.6 km | MPC · JPL |
| 568196 | 2003 SA_{438} | — | December 13, 2013 | Mount Lemmon | Mount Lemmon Survey | · | 1.9 km | MPC · JPL |
| 568197 | 2003 SG_{438} | — | September 18, 2003 | Kitt Peak | Spacewatch | GEF | 940 m | MPC · JPL |
| 568198 | 2003 SH_{438} | — | September 19, 2003 | Kitt Peak | Spacewatch | · | 1.3 km | MPC · JPL |
| 568199 | 2003 SK_{438} | — | November 1, 2008 | Mount Lemmon | Mount Lemmon Survey | WIT | 880 m | MPC · JPL |
| 568200 | 2003 SR_{438} | — | October 21, 2008 | Kitt Peak | Spacewatch | · | 1.8 km | MPC · JPL |

== 568201–568300 ==
back to top

| Designation | | | Discovery | | | Properties | | Ref |
| Permanent | Provisional | Named after | Date | Site | Discoverer(s) | Category | Diam. | Ref |
|---|---|---|---|---|---|---|---|---|
| 568201 | 2003 SX_{438} | — | March 2, 2006 | Mount Lemmon | Mount Lemmon Survey | · | 1.8 km | MPC · JPL |
| 568202 | 2003 SK_{439} | — | September 21, 2003 | Kitt Peak | Spacewatch | · | 1.3 km | MPC · JPL |
| 568203 | 2003 SZ_{439} | — | August 26, 2012 | Haleakala | Pan-STARRS 1 | · | 1.6 km | MPC · JPL |
| 568204 | 2003 SJ_{440} | — | April 16, 2013 | Haleakala | Pan-STARRS 1 | · | 3.3 km | MPC · JPL |
| 568205 | 2003 SC_{441} | — | September 27, 2003 | Kitt Peak | Spacewatch | · | 700 m | MPC · JPL |
| 568206 | 2003 SR_{441} | — | September 22, 2003 | Kitt Peak | Spacewatch | · | 840 m | MPC · JPL |
| 568207 | 2003 SS_{442} | — | September 29, 2008 | Kitt Peak | Spacewatch | · | 1.7 km | MPC · JPL |
| 568208 | 2003 ST_{442} | — | April 23, 2009 | Kitt Peak | Spacewatch | · | 530 m | MPC · JPL |
| 568209 | 2003 SE_{443} | — | September 21, 2003 | Anderson Mesa | LONEOS | · | 1.8 km | MPC · JPL |
| 568210 | 2003 SC_{444} | — | September 16, 2003 | Kitt Peak | Spacewatch | · | 1.5 km | MPC · JPL |
| 568211 | 2003 SM_{444} | — | October 20, 2008 | Kitt Peak | Spacewatch | · | 1.6 km | MPC · JPL |
| 568212 | 2003 SV_{445} | — | September 26, 2003 | Apache Point | SDSS Collaboration | · | 490 m | MPC · JPL |
| 568213 | 2003 ST_{446} | — | September 5, 2016 | Mount Lemmon | Mount Lemmon Survey | H | 380 m | MPC · JPL |
| 568214 | 2003 SU_{447} | — | July 12, 2016 | Mount Lemmon | Mount Lemmon Survey | NEM | 1.6 km | MPC · JPL |
| 568215 | 2003 SS_{449} | — | September 21, 2003 | Kitt Peak | Spacewatch | EUN | 710 m | MPC · JPL |
| 568216 | 2003 SW_{449} | — | June 8, 2011 | Mount Lemmon | Mount Lemmon Survey | (5) | 1.1 km | MPC · JPL |
| 568217 | 2003 SH_{450} | — | October 6, 2008 | Mount Lemmon | Mount Lemmon Survey | AGN | 1.2 km | MPC · JPL |
| 568218 | 2003 SH_{451} | — | September 21, 2003 | Kitt Peak | Spacewatch | EOS | 1.9 km | MPC · JPL |
| 568219 | 2003 SN_{451} | — | September 6, 2012 | Mount Lemmon | Mount Lemmon Survey | · | 1.9 km | MPC · JPL |
| 568220 | 2003 SD_{452} | — | February 7, 2011 | Mount Lemmon | Mount Lemmon Survey | · | 800 m | MPC · JPL |
| 568221 | 2003 SO_{453} | — | September 29, 2003 | Kitt Peak | Spacewatch | · | 1.7 km | MPC · JPL |
| 568222 | 2003 SO_{456} | — | May 31, 2011 | Mount Lemmon | Mount Lemmon Survey | · | 890 m | MPC · JPL |
| 568223 | 2003 SK_{457} | — | December 18, 2009 | Kitt Peak | Spacewatch | · | 2.2 km | MPC · JPL |
| 568224 | 2003 SL_{457} | — | September 29, 2008 | Mount Lemmon | Mount Lemmon Survey | AGN | 1.2 km | MPC · JPL |
| 568225 | 2003 SW_{457} | — | March 20, 1996 | Kitt Peak | Spacewatch | · | 910 m | MPC · JPL |
| 568226 | 2003 SE_{460} | — | September 20, 2003 | Palomar | NEAT | THB | 1.9 km | MPC · JPL |
| 568227 | 2003 SG_{460} | — | September 27, 2003 | Kitt Peak | Spacewatch | THM | 1.4 km | MPC · JPL |
| 568228 | 2003 SN_{460} | — | September 26, 2017 | Mount Lemmon | Mount Lemmon Survey | AGN | 910 m | MPC · JPL |
| 568229 | 2003 SJ_{461} | — | September 5, 1994 | Kitt Peak | Spacewatch | MRX | 960 m | MPC · JPL |
| 568230 | 2003 SN_{461} | — | September 30, 2003 | Kitt Peak | Spacewatch | · | 1.4 km | MPC · JPL |
| 568231 | 2003 SO_{461} | — | September 21, 2003 | Kitt Peak | Spacewatch | · | 2.0 km | MPC · JPL |
| 568232 | 2003 SZ_{463} | — | September 18, 2003 | Kitt Peak | Spacewatch | MAS | 490 m | MPC · JPL |
| 568233 | 2003 SU_{464} | — | September 18, 2003 | Kitt Peak | Spacewatch | · | 1.5 km | MPC · JPL |
| 568234 | 2003 SE_{465} | — | September 19, 2003 | Palomar | NEAT | HOF | 2.3 km | MPC · JPL |
| 568235 | 2003 SF_{465} | — | September 18, 2003 | Kitt Peak | Spacewatch | · | 1.5 km | MPC · JPL |
| 568236 | 2003 SP_{465} | — | September 30, 2003 | Kitt Peak | Spacewatch | · | 940 m | MPC · JPL |
| 568237 | 2003 SG_{469} | — | September 30, 2003 | Kitt Peak | Spacewatch | · | 990 m | MPC · JPL |
| 568238 | 2003 SM_{469} | — | September 30, 2003 | Kitt Peak | Spacewatch | AGN | 860 m | MPC · JPL |
| 568239 | 2003 SE_{470} | — | September 29, 2003 | Kitt Peak | Spacewatch | · | 2.6 km | MPC · JPL |
| 568240 | 2003 SU_{470} | — | September 29, 2003 | Kitt Peak | Spacewatch | AGN | 870 m | MPC · JPL |
| 568241 | 2003 SD_{471} | — | September 17, 2003 | Kitt Peak | Spacewatch | · | 1.6 km | MPC · JPL |
| 568242 | 2003 TP_{7} | — | September 22, 2003 | Palomar | NEAT | · | 1.1 km | MPC · JPL |
| 568243 | 2003 TP_{24} | — | October 1, 2003 | Kitt Peak | Spacewatch | V | 670 m | MPC · JPL |
| 568244 | 2003 TQ_{30} | — | September 16, 2003 | Kitt Peak | Spacewatch | · | 810 m | MPC · JPL |
| 568245 | 2003 TA_{38} | — | October 2, 2003 | Kitt Peak | Spacewatch | · | 890 m | MPC · JPL |
| 568246 | 2003 TA_{39} | — | October 2, 2003 | Kitt Peak | Spacewatch | · | 1.1 km | MPC · JPL |
| 568247 | 2003 TL_{39} | — | October 2, 2003 | Kitt Peak | Spacewatch | · | 690 m | MPC · JPL |
| 568248 | 2003 TJ_{40} | — | September 21, 2003 | Palomar | NEAT | · | 1.5 km | MPC · JPL |
| 568249 | 2003 TS_{51} | — | September 28, 2003 | Kitt Peak | Spacewatch | · | 1.7 km | MPC · JPL |
| 568250 | 2003 TZ_{59} | — | January 17, 2005 | Kitt Peak | Spacewatch | · | 2.4 km | MPC · JPL |
| 568251 | 2003 TC_{60} | — | August 16, 2012 | Siding Spring | SSS | · | 2.5 km | MPC · JPL |
| 568252 | 2003 TE_{60} | — | May 6, 2011 | Kitt Peak | Spacewatch | PAD | 1.4 km | MPC · JPL |
| 568253 | 2003 TG_{60} | — | October 16, 2007 | Mount Lemmon | Mount Lemmon Survey | · | 1.2 km | MPC · JPL |
| 568254 | 2003 TL_{60} | — | September 22, 2008 | Mount Lemmon | Mount Lemmon Survey | · | 2.0 km | MPC · JPL |
| 568255 | 2003 TA_{61} | — | March 22, 2015 | Mount Lemmon | Mount Lemmon Survey | AGN | 930 m | MPC · JPL |
| 568256 | 2003 TB_{61} | — | August 15, 2013 | Haleakala | Pan-STARRS 1 | · | 610 m | MPC · JPL |
| 568257 | 2003 TR_{61} | — | October 1, 2003 | Kitt Peak | Spacewatch | GEF | 1.1 km | MPC · JPL |
| 568258 | 2003 TO_{62} | — | October 10, 2008 | Mount Lemmon | Mount Lemmon Survey | · | 1.8 km | MPC · JPL |
| 568259 | 2003 TA_{63} | — | August 10, 2015 | Haleakala | Pan-STARRS 1 | · | 1.2 km | MPC · JPL |
| 568260 | 2003 TQ_{64} | — | October 24, 2008 | Kitt Peak | Spacewatch | · | 1.5 km | MPC · JPL |
| 568261 | 2003 TT_{64} | — | May 26, 2015 | Haleakala | Pan-STARRS 1 | EUN | 990 m | MPC · JPL |
| 568262 | 2003 UY_{35} | — | October 16, 2003 | Palomar | NEAT | · | 3.2 km | MPC · JPL |
| 568263 | 2003 UN_{40} | — | October 16, 2003 | Kitt Peak | Spacewatch | AGN | 980 m | MPC · JPL |
| 568264 | 2003 UX_{41} | — | October 17, 2003 | Kitt Peak | Spacewatch | HOF | 2.1 km | MPC · JPL |
| 568265 | 2003 UF_{45} | — | February 3, 2001 | Kitt Peak | Spacewatch | · | 1.3 km | MPC · JPL |
| 568266 | 2003 UQ_{61} | — | September 28, 2003 | Socorro | LINEAR | · | 2.4 km | MPC · JPL |
| 568267 | 2003 UX_{68} | — | October 18, 2003 | Kitt Peak | Spacewatch | · | 1.7 km | MPC · JPL |
| 568268 | 2003 UX_{72} | — | October 19, 2003 | Kitt Peak | Spacewatch | · | 1.9 km | MPC · JPL |
| 568269 | 2003 UM_{87} | — | October 1, 2003 | Kitt Peak | Spacewatch | · | 1.8 km | MPC · JPL |
| 568270 | 2003 UQ_{89} | — | May 14, 2002 | Kitt Peak | Spacewatch | · | 1.6 km | MPC · JPL |
| 568271 | 2003 UA_{116} | — | October 21, 2003 | Palomar | NEAT | V | 550 m | MPC · JPL |
| 568272 | 2003 UF_{136} | — | September 22, 2003 | Palomar | NEAT | · | 1.2 km | MPC · JPL |
| 568273 | 2003 UG_{172} | — | September 27, 2003 | Kitt Peak | Spacewatch | MRX | 850 m | MPC · JPL |
| 568274 | 2003 UY_{182} | — | September 20, 2003 | Palomar | NEAT | · | 1.7 km | MPC · JPL |
| 568275 | 2003 UG_{191} | — | October 23, 2003 | Kitt Peak | Spacewatch | · | 870 m | MPC · JPL |
| 568276 | 2003 UO_{213} | — | September 27, 2003 | Kitt Peak | Spacewatch | · | 1.9 km | MPC · JPL |
| 568277 | 2003 UN_{221} | — | October 22, 2003 | Kitt Peak | Spacewatch | · | 1.0 km | MPC · JPL |
| 568278 | 2003 UK_{230} | — | October 23, 2003 | Kitt Peak | Spacewatch | · | 2.2 km | MPC · JPL |
| 568279 | 2003 UA_{245} | — | October 24, 2003 | Socorro | LINEAR | H | 500 m | MPC · JPL |
| 568280 | 2003 UD_{280} | — | October 27, 2003 | Socorro | LINEAR | DOR | 2.1 km | MPC · JPL |
| 568281 | 2003 UX_{281} | — | October 17, 2003 | Kitt Peak | Spacewatch | · | 2.6 km | MPC · JPL |
| 568282 | 2003 UW_{294} | — | October 16, 2003 | Kitt Peak | Spacewatch | · | 1.3 km | MPC · JPL |
| 568283 | 2003 UP_{301} | — | September 21, 2003 | Kitt Peak | Spacewatch | · | 3.7 km | MPC · JPL |
| 568284 | 2003 UW_{301} | — | October 17, 2003 | Kitt Peak | Spacewatch | · | 1.7 km | MPC · JPL |
| 568285 | 2003 UU_{302} | — | September 21, 2003 | Palomar | NEAT | · | 1.6 km | MPC · JPL |
| 568286 | 2003 UE_{305} | — | October 1, 2003 | Kitt Peak | Spacewatch | · | 3.0 km | MPC · JPL |
| 568287 | 2003 UZ_{320} | — | September 20, 2003 | Kitt Peak | Spacewatch | · | 2.2 km | MPC · JPL |
| 568288 | 2003 UC_{325} | — | October 17, 2003 | Apache Point | SDSS Collaboration | MAR | 770 m | MPC · JPL |
| 568289 | 2003 UQ_{325} | — | October 17, 2003 | Apache Point | SDSS Collaboration | · | 1.7 km | MPC · JPL |
| 568290 | 2003 UF_{328} | — | October 17, 2003 | Apache Point | SDSS Collaboration | · | 1.7 km | MPC · JPL |
| 568291 | 2003 UA_{329} | — | October 17, 2003 | Apache Point | SDSS Collaboration | · | 3.2 km | MPC · JPL |
| 568292 | 2003 UM_{331} | — | September 22, 2003 | Kitt Peak | Spacewatch | · | 2.0 km | MPC · JPL |
| 568293 | 2003 UL_{333} | — | October 18, 2003 | Apache Point | SDSS Collaboration | · | 2.7 km | MPC · JPL |
| 568294 | 2003 UP_{333} | — | September 29, 2003 | Kitt Peak | Spacewatch | · | 3.4 km | MPC · JPL |
| 568295 | 2003 UQ_{333} | — | September 29, 2003 | Kitt Peak | Spacewatch | · | 1.7 km | MPC · JPL |
| 568296 | 2003 UQ_{334} | — | October 18, 2003 | Apache Point | SDSS | · | 860 m | MPC · JPL |
| 568297 | 2003 UN_{337} | — | September 29, 2003 | Kitt Peak | Spacewatch | · | 1.3 km | MPC · JPL |
| 568298 | 2003 UM_{338} | — | September 17, 2003 | Kitt Peak | Spacewatch | (5) | 1.4 km | MPC · JPL |
| 568299 | 2003 UU_{341} | — | October 19, 2003 | Apache Point | SDSS Collaboration | · | 3.4 km | MPC · JPL |
| 568300 | 2003 UM_{343} | — | September 30, 2003 | Kitt Peak | Spacewatch | GEF | 810 m | MPC · JPL |

== 568301–568400 ==
back to top

| Designation | | | Discovery | | | Properties | | Ref |
| Permanent | Provisional | Named after | Date | Site | Discoverer(s) | Category | Diam. | Ref |
|---|---|---|---|---|---|---|---|---|
| 568301 | 2003 UA_{344} | — | October 19, 2003 | Kitt Peak | Spacewatch | · | 1.5 km | MPC · JPL |
| 568302 | 2003 UV_{344} | — | October 19, 2003 | Apache Point | SDSS | · | 1.2 km | MPC · JPL |
| 568303 | 2003 UK_{347} | — | October 19, 2003 | Apache Point | SDSS Collaboration | · | 650 m | MPC · JPL |
| 568304 | 2003 UZ_{348} | — | October 19, 2003 | Apache Point | SDSS Collaboration | · | 1.1 km | MPC · JPL |
| 568305 | 2003 UN_{349} | — | October 19, 2003 | Apache Point | SDSS Collaboration | · | 1.4 km | MPC · JPL |
| 568306 | 2003 UE_{351} | — | October 19, 2003 | Apache Point | SDSS | AGN | 1.1 km | MPC · JPL |
| 568307 | 2003 UX_{351} | — | October 19, 2003 | Apache Point | SDSS Collaboration | MRX | 750 m | MPC · JPL |
| 568308 | 2003 UW_{352} | — | October 19, 2003 | Apache Point | SDSS Collaboration | · | 1.7 km | MPC · JPL |
| 568309 | 2003 UA_{354} | — | October 19, 2003 | Apache Point | SDSS Collaboration | · | 1.4 km | MPC · JPL |
| 568310 | 2003 UQ_{355} | — | October 19, 2003 | Kitt Peak | Spacewatch | · | 2.2 km | MPC · JPL |
| 568311 | 2003 UP_{356} | — | October 19, 2003 | Kitt Peak | Spacewatch | · | 1.6 km | MPC · JPL |
| 568312 | 2003 UJ_{361} | — | October 20, 2003 | Kitt Peak | Spacewatch | · | 1.6 km | MPC · JPL |
| 568313 | 2003 UN_{361} | — | October 20, 2003 | Kitt Peak | Spacewatch | · | 1.5 km | MPC · JPL |
| 568314 | 2003 UY_{364} | — | October 20, 2003 | Kitt Peak | Spacewatch | · | 1.1 km | MPC · JPL |
| 568315 | 2003 UC_{371} | — | October 22, 2003 | Apache Point | SDSS Collaboration | TIR | 3.0 km | MPC · JPL |
| 568316 | 2003 UL_{371} | — | September 20, 2003 | Kitt Peak | Spacewatch | · | 3.6 km | MPC · JPL |
| 568317 | 2003 UZ_{372} | — | September 16, 2003 | Palomar | NEAT | · | 1.0 km | MPC · JPL |
| 568318 | 2003 UD_{380} | — | October 22, 2003 | Apache Point | SDSS Collaboration | AGN | 1.0 km | MPC · JPL |
| 568319 | 2003 UN_{386} | — | October 5, 2003 | Kitt Peak | Spacewatch | · | 2.2 km | MPC · JPL |
| 568320 | 2003 UN_{388} | — | October 22, 2003 | Apache Point | SDSS | GEF | 1.0 km | MPC · JPL |
| 568321 | 2003 UT_{388} | — | October 22, 2003 | Kitt Peak | Spacewatch | · | 1.6 km | MPC · JPL |
| 568322 | 2003 UP_{389} | — | October 22, 2003 | Apache Point | SDSS Collaboration | · | 1.8 km | MPC · JPL |
| 568323 | 2003 UK_{399} | — | October 22, 2003 | Apache Point | SDSS Collaboration | · | 1.8 km | MPC · JPL |
| 568324 | 2003 UB_{401} | — | September 22, 2003 | Kitt Peak | Spacewatch | · | 1.6 km | MPC · JPL |
| 568325 | 2003 UX_{403} | — | January 16, 2005 | Kitt Peak | Spacewatch | · | 2.0 km | MPC · JPL |
| 568326 | 2003 UL_{406} | — | October 23, 2003 | Apache Point | SDSS Collaboration | · | 1.5 km | MPC · JPL |
| 568327 | 2003 UP_{406} | — | October 23, 2003 | Apache Point | SDSS Collaboration | · | 1.2 km | MPC · JPL |
| 568328 | 2003 UX_{407} | — | October 20, 2003 | Kitt Peak | Spacewatch | WIT | 680 m | MPC · JPL |
| 568329 | 2003 UZ_{412} | — | October 23, 2003 | Kitt Peak | Spacewatch | · | 1.9 km | MPC · JPL |
| 568330 | 2003 UE_{413} | — | October 23, 2003 | Kitt Peak | Spacewatch | NYS | 1.3 km | MPC · JPL |
| 568331 | 2003 UW_{413} | — | October 29, 2003 | Kitt Peak | Spacewatch | · | 1.9 km | MPC · JPL |
| 568332 | 2003 UH_{417} | — | October 23, 2003 | Kitt Peak | Spacewatch | AGN | 1.1 km | MPC · JPL |
| 568333 | 2003 US_{419} | — | January 13, 2005 | Kitt Peak | Spacewatch | · | 1.9 km | MPC · JPL |
| 568334 | 2003 UY_{419} | — | October 19, 2003 | Kitt Peak | Spacewatch | · | 1.9 km | MPC · JPL |
| 568335 | 2003 UB_{420} | — | October 10, 2012 | Nogales | M. Schwartz, P. R. Holvorcem | · | 2.4 km | MPC · JPL |
| 568336 | 2003 UG_{420} | — | September 21, 2009 | Mount Lemmon | Mount Lemmon Survey | · | 3.5 km | MPC · JPL |
| 568337 | 2003 US_{420} | — | October 27, 2003 | Kitt Peak | Spacewatch | · | 1.9 km | MPC · JPL |
| 568338 | 2003 UT_{420} | — | October 21, 2008 | Kitt Peak | Spacewatch | · | 2.0 km | MPC · JPL |
| 568339 | 2003 UU_{420} | — | December 26, 2011 | Mount Lemmon | Mount Lemmon Survey | SYL | 4.0 km | MPC · JPL |
| 568340 | 2003 UX_{420} | — | October 23, 2003 | Apache Point | SDSS Collaboration | · | 2.1 km | MPC · JPL |
| 568341 | 2003 UY_{420} | — | February 9, 2005 | Kitt Peak | Spacewatch | AGN | 1.0 km | MPC · JPL |
| 568342 | 2003 UG_{421} | — | February 15, 2010 | Kitt Peak | Spacewatch | · | 1.4 km | MPC · JPL |
| 568343 | 2003 UO_{421} | — | August 24, 2012 | Mayhill-ISON | L. Elenin | · | 2.0 km | MPC · JPL |
| 568344 | 2003 UP_{421} | — | April 13, 2013 | Haleakala | Pan-STARRS 1 | · | 1.3 km | MPC · JPL |
| 568345 | 2003 UK_{422} | — | December 22, 2012 | Piszkéstető | K. Sárneczky, Hodosan, G. | · | 1.3 km | MPC · JPL |
| 568346 | 2003 UO_{422} | — | September 18, 2012 | Mount Lemmon | Mount Lemmon Survey | AGN | 1.0 km | MPC · JPL |
| 568347 | 2003 UB_{423} | — | June 3, 2011 | Kitt Peak | Spacewatch | · | 1.8 km | MPC · JPL |
| 568348 | 2003 UH_{423} | — | October 6, 2012 | Haleakala | Pan-STARRS 1 | · | 2.0 km | MPC · JPL |
| 568349 | 2003 UJ_{423} | — | September 22, 2012 | Kitt Peak | Spacewatch | · | 1.8 km | MPC · JPL |
| 568350 | 2003 UR_{423} | — | January 19, 2015 | Mount Lemmon | Mount Lemmon Survey | (16286) | 1.5 km | MPC · JPL |
| 568351 | 2003 UG_{424} | — | October 24, 2003 | Apache Point | SDSS Collaboration | · | 840 m | MPC · JPL |
| 568352 | 2003 UJ_{424} | — | May 22, 2011 | Mount Lemmon | Mount Lemmon Survey | · | 1.8 km | MPC · JPL |
| 568353 | 2003 UQ_{424} | — | November 21, 2008 | Mount Lemmon | Mount Lemmon Survey | HOF | 2.0 km | MPC · JPL |
| 568354 | 2003 UT_{424} | — | September 25, 2008 | Kitt Peak | Spacewatch | · | 1.4 km | MPC · JPL |
| 568355 | 2003 UM_{425} | — | November 7, 2008 | Mount Lemmon | Mount Lemmon Survey | · | 1.4 km | MPC · JPL |
| 568356 | 2003 UV_{425} | — | October 3, 2013 | Kitt Peak | Spacewatch | · | 1.5 km | MPC · JPL |
| 568357 | 2003 UH_{426} | — | August 25, 2012 | Kitt Peak | Spacewatch | · | 2.2 km | MPC · JPL |
| 568358 | 2003 UT_{426} | — | September 21, 2012 | Mount Lemmon | Mount Lemmon Survey | · | 1.6 km | MPC · JPL |
| 568359 | 2003 UZ_{426} | — | October 19, 2003 | Kitt Peak | Spacewatch | · | 1.8 km | MPC · JPL |
| 568360 | 2003 UF_{427} | — | October 18, 2003 | Kitt Peak | Spacewatch | · | 730 m | MPC · JPL |
| 568361 | 2003 UY_{427} | — | October 19, 2003 | Apache Point | SDSS Collaboration | · | 1.6 km | MPC · JPL |
| 568362 | 2003 UM_{429} | — | February 23, 2015 | Haleakala | Pan-STARRS 1 | · | 550 m | MPC · JPL |
| 568363 | 2003 UO_{429} | — | March 24, 2015 | Mount Lemmon | Mount Lemmon Survey | · | 1.3 km | MPC · JPL |
| 568364 | 2003 UW_{429} | — | January 17, 2016 | Haleakala | Pan-STARRS 1 | V | 450 m | MPC · JPL |
| 568365 | 2003 UZ_{429} | — | August 31, 2014 | Haleakala | Pan-STARRS 1 | · | 980 m | MPC · JPL |
| 568366 | 2003 UD_{432} | — | April 25, 2007 | Mount Lemmon | Mount Lemmon Survey | · | 2.3 km | MPC · JPL |
| 568367 | 2003 UL_{432} | — | October 22, 2003 | Kitt Peak | Spacewatch | · | 930 m | MPC · JPL |
| 568368 | 2003 UN_{432} | — | October 22, 2003 | Apache Point | SDSS Collaboration | · | 1.5 km | MPC · JPL |
| 568369 | 2003 UT_{432} | — | September 28, 2009 | Kitt Peak | Spacewatch | · | 4.3 km | MPC · JPL |
| 568370 | 2003 UV_{432} | — | October 19, 2003 | Apache Point | SDSS Collaboration | · | 1.7 km | MPC · JPL |
| 568371 | 2003 UZ_{432} | — | October 12, 1999 | Kitt Peak | Spacewatch | · | 630 m | MPC · JPL |
| 568372 | 2003 UA_{433} | — | April 15, 2005 | Kitt Peak | Spacewatch | H | 420 m | MPC · JPL |
| 568373 | 2003 UR_{433} | — | January 1, 2014 | Haleakala | Pan-STARRS 1 | AGN | 1.1 km | MPC · JPL |
| 568374 | 2003 UT_{433} | — | September 27, 2017 | Mount Lemmon | Mount Lemmon Survey | · | 1.6 km | MPC · JPL |
| 568375 | 2003 UH_{434} | — | April 30, 2011 | Mount Lemmon | Mount Lemmon Survey | HOF | 2.3 km | MPC · JPL |
| 568376 | 2003 UN_{434} | — | April 13, 2011 | Haleakala | Pan-STARRS 1 | DOR | 2.6 km | MPC · JPL |
| 568377 | 2003 US_{434} | — | October 24, 2003 | Kitt Peak | Spacewatch | · | 2.2 km | MPC · JPL |
| 568378 | 2003 UJ_{436} | — | December 5, 2008 | Kitt Peak | Spacewatch | HOF | 2.2 km | MPC · JPL |
| 568379 | 2003 UG_{437} | — | September 20, 2014 | Haleakala | Pan-STARRS 1 | · | 810 m | MPC · JPL |
| 568380 | 2003 UJ_{437} | — | January 11, 2008 | Mount Lemmon | Mount Lemmon Survey | · | 900 m | MPC · JPL |
| 568381 | 2003 UY_{437} | — | September 22, 2008 | Kitt Peak | Spacewatch | KOR | 1.3 km | MPC · JPL |
| 568382 | 2003 UZ_{437} | — | August 10, 2007 | Kitt Peak | Spacewatch | AGN | 1.2 km | MPC · JPL |
| 568383 | 2003 UB_{438} | — | December 11, 2013 | Haleakala | Pan-STARRS 1 | · | 1.9 km | MPC · JPL |
| 568384 | 2003 UE_{438} | — | October 21, 2003 | Kitt Peak | Spacewatch | · | 1.5 km | MPC · JPL |
| 568385 | 2003 UA_{439} | — | November 2, 2008 | Mount Lemmon | Mount Lemmon Survey | HOF | 2.0 km | MPC · JPL |
| 568386 | 2003 UG_{440} | — | October 17, 2003 | Kitt Peak | Spacewatch | HOF | 2.2 km | MPC · JPL |
| 568387 | 2003 UU_{441} | — | August 26, 2012 | Haleakala | Pan-STARRS 1 | · | 1.6 km | MPC · JPL |
| 568388 | 2003 UK_{442} | — | December 14, 2010 | Mount Lemmon | Mount Lemmon Survey | (260) | 3.0 km | MPC · JPL |
| 568389 | 2003 US_{444} | — | October 24, 2003 | Apache Point | SDSS Collaboration | · | 720 m | MPC · JPL |
| 568390 | 2003 VY_{2} | — | November 14, 2003 | Palomar | NEAT | H | 620 m | MPC · JPL |
| 568391 | 2003 VW_{4} | — | November 15, 2003 | Kitt Peak | Spacewatch | · | 1.7 km | MPC · JPL |
| 568392 | 2003 VO_{6} | — | October 20, 2003 | Kitt Peak | Spacewatch | · | 520 m | MPC · JPL |
| 568393 | 2003 VA_{13} | — | October 20, 2003 | Kitt Peak | Spacewatch | · | 1 km | MPC · JPL |
| 568394 | 2003 VD_{13} | — | November 15, 2003 | Kitt Peak | Spacewatch | · | 870 m | MPC · JPL |
| 568395 | 2003 WZ_{24} | — | October 16, 2003 | Palomar | NEAT | H | 570 m | MPC · JPL |
| 568396 | 2003 WF_{92} | — | November 18, 2003 | Palomar | NEAT | NYS | 1.3 km | MPC · JPL |
| 568397 | 2003 WA_{106} | — | November 21, 2003 | Kitt Peak | Spacewatch | · | 1.5 km | MPC · JPL |
| 568398 | 2003 WU_{159} | — | November 30, 2003 | Kitt Peak | Spacewatch | KOR | 1.2 km | MPC · JPL |
| 568399 | 2003 WO_{174} | — | November 19, 2003 | Kitt Peak | Spacewatch | · | 1.1 km | MPC · JPL |
| 568400 | 2003 WT_{180} | — | November 20, 2003 | Kitt Peak | Deep Ecliptic Survey | · | 1.7 km | MPC · JPL |

== 568401–568500 ==
back to top

| Designation | | | Discovery | | | Properties | | Ref |
| Permanent | Provisional | Named after | Date | Site | Discoverer(s) | Category | Diam. | Ref |
|---|---|---|---|---|---|---|---|---|
| 568401 | 2003 WH_{182} | — | November 22, 2003 | Kitt Peak | Deep Ecliptic Survey | · | 1.7 km | MPC · JPL |
| 568402 | 2003 WB_{186} | — | November 22, 2003 | Kitt Peak | Deep Ecliptic Survey | · | 1.8 km | MPC · JPL |
| 568403 | 2003 WX_{187} | — | October 21, 2003 | Kitt Peak | Spacewatch | · | 740 m | MPC · JPL |
| 568404 | 2003 WG_{196} | — | November 19, 2003 | Kitt Peak | Spacewatch | · | 1.7 km | MPC · JPL |
| 568405 | 2003 WK_{196} | — | April 5, 2005 | Mount Lemmon | Mount Lemmon Survey | · | 860 m | MPC · JPL |
| 568406 | 2003 WS_{196} | — | March 18, 2010 | Mount Lemmon | Mount Lemmon Survey | · | 1.6 km | MPC · JPL |
| 568407 | 2003 WC_{197} | — | August 26, 2012 | Catalina | CSS | · | 2.0 km | MPC · JPL |
| 568408 | 2003 WP_{197} | — | November 26, 2003 | Kitt Peak | Spacewatch | · | 730 m | MPC · JPL |
| 568409 | 2003 WR_{197} | — | October 20, 2012 | Haleakala | Pan-STARRS 1 | · | 1.3 km | MPC · JPL |
| 568410 | 2003 WD_{199} | — | October 8, 2012 | Haleakala | Pan-STARRS 1 | · | 1.5 km | MPC · JPL |
| 568411 | 2003 WL_{199} | — | August 28, 2006 | Catalina | CSS | · | 490 m | MPC · JPL |
| 568412 | 2003 WP_{201} | — | November 20, 2003 | Kitt Peak | Spacewatch | · | 930 m | MPC · JPL |
| 568413 | 2003 WE_{203} | — | September 15, 2007 | Mount Lemmon | Mount Lemmon Survey | · | 1.5 km | MPC · JPL |
| 568414 | 2003 WP_{207} | — | October 3, 2013 | Haleakala | Pan-STARRS 1 | · | 1.4 km | MPC · JPL |
| 568415 | 2003 WE_{208} | — | September 12, 2007 | Mount Lemmon | Mount Lemmon Survey | KOR | 1.1 km | MPC · JPL |
| 568416 | 2003 WG_{209} | — | May 18, 2013 | Mount Lemmon | Mount Lemmon Survey | MAS | 510 m | MPC · JPL |
| 568417 | 2003 WN_{209} | — | September 2, 2014 | Haleakala | Pan-STARRS 1 | · | 1.1 km | MPC · JPL |
| 568418 | 2003 WO_{209} | — | February 21, 2009 | Kitt Peak | Spacewatch | · | 950 m | MPC · JPL |
| 568419 | 2003 WD_{210} | — | November 19, 2003 | Kitt Peak | Spacewatch | · | 1.0 km | MPC · JPL |
| 568420 | 2003 WB_{211} | — | September 17, 2017 | Haleakala | Pan-STARRS 1 | KOR | 970 m | MPC · JPL |
| 568421 | 2003 WQ_{211} | — | October 7, 2012 | Haleakala | Pan-STARRS 1 | · | 1.8 km | MPC · JPL |
| 568422 | 2003 WY_{211} | — | November 19, 2003 | Kitt Peak | Spacewatch | HOF | 2.4 km | MPC · JPL |
| 568423 | 2003 WB_{213} | — | March 11, 2005 | Kitt Peak | Spacewatch | · | 1.2 km | MPC · JPL |
| 568424 | 2003 WV_{214} | — | November 21, 2003 | Kitt Peak | Spacewatch | · | 2.3 km | MPC · JPL |
| 568425 | 2003 WX_{214} | — | November 20, 2003 | Kitt Peak | Deep Ecliptic Survey | L5 | 7.2 km | MPC · JPL |
| 568426 | 2003 XO_{23} | — | December 1, 2003 | Kitt Peak | Spacewatch | · | 1.7 km | MPC · JPL |
| 568427 | 2003 XK_{24} | — | November 20, 2003 | Kitt Peak | Spacewatch | · | 1.6 km | MPC · JPL |
| 568428 | 2003 XT_{36} | — | December 3, 2003 | Socorro | LINEAR | · | 1.2 km | MPC · JPL |
| 568429 | 2003 XC_{42} | — | December 14, 2003 | Kitt Peak | Spacewatch | · | 2.1 km | MPC · JPL |
| 568430 | 2003 XC_{44} | — | February 17, 2010 | Mount Lemmon | Mount Lemmon Survey | · | 2.0 km | MPC · JPL |
| 568431 | 2003 XC_{45} | — | December 1, 2003 | Kitt Peak | Spacewatch | H | 430 m | MPC · JPL |
| 568432 | 2003 XH_{45} | — | October 21, 2003 | Kitt Peak | Spacewatch | · | 1.9 km | MPC · JPL |
| 568433 | 2003 XZ_{45} | — | August 3, 2016 | Haleakala | Pan-STARRS 1 | AGN | 1.2 km | MPC · JPL |
| 568434 | 2003 XD_{46} | — | August 22, 2014 | Haleakala | Pan-STARRS 1 | · | 840 m | MPC · JPL |
| 568435 | 2003 YH_{36} | — | November 21, 2003 | Socorro | LINEAR | H | 480 m | MPC · JPL |
| 568436 | 2003 YM_{70} | — | December 22, 2003 | Socorro | LINEAR | H | 510 m | MPC · JPL |
| 568437 | 2003 YB_{102} | — | December 17, 2003 | Kitt Peak | Spacewatch | · | 1.4 km | MPC · JPL |
| 568438 | 2003 YA_{151} | — | December 29, 2003 | Catalina | CSS | · | 2.4 km | MPC · JPL |
| 568439 | 2003 YR_{170} | — | December 18, 2003 | Kitt Peak | Spacewatch | · | 870 m | MPC · JPL |
| 568440 | 2003 YN_{183} | — | May 24, 2006 | Kitt Peak | Spacewatch | · | 1.8 km | MPC · JPL |
| 568441 | 2003 YQ_{183} | — | December 22, 2003 | Kitt Peak | Spacewatch | · | 2.1 km | MPC · JPL |
| 568442 | 2003 YU_{183} | — | October 21, 2008 | Kitt Peak | Spacewatch | · | 1.8 km | MPC · JPL |
| 568443 | 2003 YX_{183} | — | December 8, 2012 | Mount Lemmon | Mount Lemmon Survey | GEF | 1.1 km | MPC · JPL |
| 568444 | 2003 YF_{184} | — | November 18, 2014 | Haleakala | Pan-STARRS 1 | NYS | 770 m | MPC · JPL |
| 568445 | 2003 YJ_{184} | — | September 28, 2013 | Mount Lemmon | Mount Lemmon Survey | L5 | 7.7 km | MPC · JPL |
| 568446 | 2003 YC_{185} | — | June 15, 2015 | Haleakala | Pan-STARRS 1 | HNS | 1.2 km | MPC · JPL |
| 568447 | 2003 YC_{186} | — | March 24, 2015 | Haleakala | Pan-STARRS 1 | · | 2.0 km | MPC · JPL |
| 568448 | 2003 YX_{186} | — | October 24, 2017 | Mount Lemmon | Mount Lemmon Survey | · | 1.7 km | MPC · JPL |
| 568449 | 2003 YP_{187} | — | February 13, 2004 | Kitt Peak | Spacewatch | · | 1.8 km | MPC · JPL |
| 568450 | 2003 YU_{189} | — | February 11, 2004 | Palomar | NEAT | · | 2.2 km | MPC · JPL |
| 568451 | 2003 YO_{190} | — | December 29, 2003 | Kitt Peak | Spacewatch | JUN | 720 m | MPC · JPL |
| 568452 | 2004 AN_{14} | — | January 15, 2004 | Kitt Peak | Spacewatch | · | 1.0 km | MPC · JPL |
| 568453 | 2004 BP_{25} | — | January 19, 2004 | Socorro | LINEAR | · | 1.9 km | MPC · JPL |
| 568454 | 2004 BR_{26} | — | January 16, 2004 | Palomar | NEAT | H | 610 m | MPC · JPL |
| 568455 | 2004 BC_{45} | — | January 22, 2004 | Socorro | LINEAR | H | 510 m | MPC · JPL |
| 568456 | 2004 BE_{65} | — | January 22, 2004 | Socorro | LINEAR | · | 1.2 km | MPC · JPL |
| 568457 | 2004 BR_{138} | — | January 19, 2004 | Kitt Peak | Spacewatch | · | 640 m | MPC · JPL |
| 568458 | 2004 BC_{143} | — | January 19, 2004 | Kitt Peak | Spacewatch | · | 1.7 km | MPC · JPL |
| 568459 | 2004 BW_{156} | — | January 28, 2004 | Kitt Peak | Spacewatch | PHO | 690 m | MPC · JPL |
| 568460 | 2004 BV_{165} | — | November 28, 2014 | Haleakala | Pan-STARRS 1 | · | 1.2 km | MPC · JPL |
| 568461 | 2004 BX_{165} | — | October 12, 2007 | Mount Lemmon | Mount Lemmon Survey | · | 1.8 km | MPC · JPL |
| 568462 | 2004 BG_{167} | — | January 28, 2004 | Kitt Peak | Spacewatch | · | 440 m | MPC · JPL |
| 568463 | 2004 BL_{167} | — | July 4, 2016 | Haleakala | Pan-STARRS 1 | · | 1.5 km | MPC · JPL |
| 568464 | 2004 BD_{168} | — | January 19, 2004 | Kitt Peak | Spacewatch | MIS | 1.7 km | MPC · JPL |
| 568465 | 2004 BP_{173} | — | January 30, 2004 | Kitt Peak | Spacewatch | · | 1.2 km | MPC · JPL |
| 568466 | 2004 CL_{17} | — | January 30, 2004 | Kitt Peak | Spacewatch | H | 450 m | MPC · JPL |
| 568467 | 2004 CX_{32} | — | January 22, 2004 | Socorro | LINEAR | · | 2.2 km | MPC · JPL |
| 568468 | 2004 CW_{55} | — | February 11, 2004 | Palomar | NEAT | · | 530 m | MPC · JPL |
| 568469 | 2004 CT_{96} | — | February 11, 2004 | Palomar | NEAT | H | 430 m | MPC · JPL |
| 568470 | 2004 CP_{122} | — | August 29, 2006 | Kitt Peak | Spacewatch | · | 1.5 km | MPC · JPL |
| 568471 | 2004 CO_{123} | — | February 12, 2004 | Kitt Peak | Spacewatch | · | 640 m | MPC · JPL |
| 568472 | 2004 CC_{126} | — | February 12, 2004 | Kitt Peak | Spacewatch | · | 730 m | MPC · JPL |
| 568473 | 2004 CE_{131} | — | February 12, 2004 | Palomar | NEAT | · | 1.3 km | MPC · JPL |
| 568474 | 2004 CJ_{131} | — | October 22, 2012 | Haleakala | Pan-STARRS 1 | · | 640 m | MPC · JPL |
| 568475 | 2004 CS_{133} | — | February 13, 2008 | Mount Lemmon | Mount Lemmon Survey | MAS | 570 m | MPC · JPL |
| 568476 | 2004 CB_{135} | — | February 11, 2008 | Mount Lemmon | Mount Lemmon Survey | · | 950 m | MPC · JPL |
| 568477 | 2004 CM_{135} | — | April 5, 2014 | Haleakala | Pan-STARRS 1 | · | 590 m | MPC · JPL |
| 568478 | 2004 CW_{135} | — | September 19, 2014 | Haleakala | Pan-STARRS 1 | NYS | 760 m | MPC · JPL |
| 568479 | 2004 DO_{1} | — | February 16, 2004 | Socorro | LINEAR | H | 480 m | MPC · JPL |
| 568480 | 2004 DK_{70} | — | February 26, 2004 | Kitt Peak | Deep Ecliptic Survey | L5 | 7.1 km | MPC · JPL |
| 568481 | 2004 DU_{80} | — | February 17, 2004 | Kitt Peak | Spacewatch | · | 1.5 km | MPC · JPL |
| 568482 | 2004 DE_{81} | — | February 5, 2009 | Kitt Peak | Spacewatch | · | 1.8 km | MPC · JPL |
| 568483 | 2004 DT_{81} | — | July 13, 2016 | Mount Lemmon | Mount Lemmon Survey | · | 2.0 km | MPC · JPL |
| 568484 | 2004 DW_{81} | — | August 17, 2006 | Palomar | NEAT | EOS | 1.7 km | MPC · JPL |
| 568485 | 2004 DE_{82} | — | October 21, 2006 | Mount Lemmon | Mount Lemmon Survey | · | 1.1 km | MPC · JPL |
| 568486 | 2004 DQ_{82} | — | April 9, 2014 | Haleakala | Pan-STARRS 1 | · | 670 m | MPC · JPL |
| 568487 | 2004 DT_{82} | — | September 18, 2012 | Mount Lemmon | Mount Lemmon Survey | EOS | 1.6 km | MPC · JPL |
| 568488 | 2004 DM_{83} | — | January 9, 2016 | Haleakala | Pan-STARRS 1 | PHO | 1.0 km | MPC · JPL |
| 568489 | 2004 DW_{85} | — | July 7, 2016 | Haleakala | Pan-STARRS 1 | · | 640 m | MPC · JPL |
| 568490 | 2004 DL_{88} | — | January 2, 2014 | Kitt Peak | Spacewatch | EOS | 1.5 km | MPC · JPL |
| 568491 | 2004 DQ_{88} | — | January 20, 2009 | Kitt Peak | Spacewatch | · | 1.9 km | MPC · JPL |
| 568492 | 2004 DO_{89} | — | February 22, 2004 | Kitt Peak | Deep Ecliptic Survey | · | 2.2 km | MPC · JPL |
| 568493 | 2004 EM_{28} | — | March 15, 2004 | Kitt Peak | Spacewatch | EOS | 1.3 km | MPC · JPL |
| 568494 | 2004 EQ_{29} | — | March 15, 2004 | Kitt Peak | Spacewatch | · | 1.7 km | MPC · JPL |
| 568495 | 2004 ET_{32} | — | March 15, 2004 | Palomar | NEAT | · | 1.6 km | MPC · JPL |
| 568496 | 2004 EK_{89} | — | March 14, 2004 | Kitt Peak | Spacewatch | · | 970 m | MPC · JPL |
| 568497 | 2004 EZ_{90} | — | March 15, 2004 | Kitt Peak | Spacewatch | · | 1.3 km | MPC · JPL |
| 568498 | 2004 EO_{101} | — | March 15, 2004 | Kitt Peak | Spacewatch | · | 1.5 km | MPC · JPL |
| 568499 | 2004 EW_{102} | — | March 15, 2004 | Kitt Peak | Spacewatch | · | 870 m | MPC · JPL |
| 568500 | 2004 EM_{105} | — | March 15, 2004 | Kitt Peak | Spacewatch | · | 1.4 km | MPC · JPL |

== 568501–568600 ==
back to top

| Designation | | | Discovery | | | Properties | | Ref |
| Permanent | Provisional | Named after | Date | Site | Discoverer(s) | Category | Diam. | Ref |
|---|---|---|---|---|---|---|---|---|
| 568501 | 2004 EG_{106} | — | March 15, 2004 | Kitt Peak | Spacewatch | KOR | 1.3 km | MPC · JPL |
| 568502 | 2004 EM_{107} | — | March 15, 2004 | Kitt Peak | Spacewatch | · | 1.6 km | MPC · JPL |
| 568503 | 2004 EY_{116} | — | October 17, 2007 | Mount Lemmon | Mount Lemmon Survey | EOS | 1.5 km | MPC · JPL |
| 568504 | 2004 EG_{117} | — | November 26, 2014 | Catalina | CSS | · | 1.1 km | MPC · JPL |
| 568505 | 2004 EL_{117} | — | January 12, 2011 | Mount Lemmon | Mount Lemmon Survey | MAS | 500 m | MPC · JPL |
| 568506 | 2004 EO_{117} | — | November 8, 2007 | Mount Lemmon | Mount Lemmon Survey | · | 1.8 km | MPC · JPL |
| 568507 | 2004 EA_{118} | — | March 15, 2004 | Kitt Peak | Spacewatch | · | 820 m | MPC · JPL |
| 568508 | 2004 EB_{118} | — | March 15, 2004 | Kitt Peak | Spacewatch | 3:2 · SHU | 3.9 km | MPC · JPL |
| 568509 | 2004 FT_{29} | — | March 27, 2004 | Bergisch Gladbach | W. Bickel | EMA | 2.2 km | MPC · JPL |
| 568510 | 2004 FU_{54} | — | March 18, 2004 | Kitt Peak | Spacewatch | · | 510 m | MPC · JPL |
| 568511 | 2004 FB_{60} | — | March 18, 2004 | Kitt Peak | Spacewatch | V | 530 m | MPC · JPL |
| 568512 | 2004 FG_{63} | — | March 19, 2004 | Socorro | LINEAR | H | 520 m | MPC · JPL |
| 568513 | 2004 FS_{68} | — | March 16, 2004 | Kitt Peak | Spacewatch | · | 1.2 km | MPC · JPL |
| 568514 | 2004 FP_{72} | — | February 26, 2004 | Kitt Peak | Deep Ecliptic Survey | · | 1.2 km | MPC · JPL |
| 568515 | 2004 FJ_{113} | — | March 21, 2004 | Kitt Peak | Spacewatch | · | 1.6 km | MPC · JPL |
| 568516 | 2004 FO_{113} | — | March 21, 2004 | Kitt Peak | Spacewatch | · | 2.7 km | MPC · JPL |
| 568517 | 2004 FD_{120} | — | March 23, 2004 | Kitt Peak | Spacewatch | · | 2.0 km | MPC · JPL |
| 568518 | 2004 FG_{123} | — | March 26, 2004 | Kitt Peak | Spacewatch | · | 1.0 km | MPC · JPL |
| 568519 | 2004 FX_{131} | — | March 23, 2004 | Kitt Peak | Spacewatch | · | 2.0 km | MPC · JPL |
| 568520 | 2004 FV_{144} | — | March 29, 2004 | Kitt Peak | Spacewatch | · | 2.2 km | MPC · JPL |
| 568521 | 2004 FW_{144} | — | March 29, 2004 | Kitt Peak | Spacewatch | EOS | 1.4 km | MPC · JPL |
| 568522 | 2004 FY_{154} | — | March 17, 2004 | Kitt Peak | Spacewatch | · | 1.7 km | MPC · JPL |
| 568523 | 2004 FR_{157} | — | March 17, 2004 | Kitt Peak | Spacewatch | THM | 2.2 km | MPC · JPL |
| 568524 | 2004 FU_{167} | — | July 1, 2011 | Mount Lemmon | Mount Lemmon Survey | · | 2.4 km | MPC · JPL |
| 568525 | 2004 FB_{168} | — | March 2, 2009 | Mount Lemmon | Mount Lemmon Survey | EOS | 1.7 km | MPC · JPL |
| 568526 | 2004 FH_{168} | — | August 31, 2005 | Kitt Peak | Spacewatch | · | 1.1 km | MPC · JPL |
| 568527 | 2004 FM_{168} | — | May 18, 2015 | Mount Lemmon | Mount Lemmon Survey | · | 2.0 km | MPC · JPL |
| 568528 | 2004 FP_{168} | — | January 20, 2009 | Mount Lemmon | Mount Lemmon Survey | EOS | 2.1 km | MPC · JPL |
| 568529 | 2004 FR_{168} | — | March 2, 2009 | Kitt Peak | Spacewatch | KOR | 1.3 km | MPC · JPL |
| 568530 | 2004 FM_{169} | — | March 13, 2012 | Mount Lemmon | Mount Lemmon Survey | · | 790 m | MPC · JPL |
| 568531 | 2004 FQ_{169} | — | March 21, 2009 | Kitt Peak | Spacewatch | AGN | 950 m | MPC · JPL |
| 568532 | 2004 FR_{170} | — | September 19, 2012 | Mount Lemmon | Mount Lemmon Survey | · | 2.2 km | MPC · JPL |
| 568533 | 2004 FT_{170} | — | October 11, 2007 | Kitt Peak | Spacewatch | · | 2.2 km | MPC · JPL |
| 568534 | 2004 FC_{171} | — | February 26, 2014 | Haleakala | Pan-STARRS 1 | · | 1.9 km | MPC · JPL |
| 568535 | 2004 FY_{171} | — | January 27, 2011 | Mount Lemmon | Mount Lemmon Survey | · | 810 m | MPC · JPL |
| 568536 | 2004 FR_{172} | — | September 19, 2012 | Mount Lemmon | Mount Lemmon Survey | AEG | 2.2 km | MPC · JPL |
| 568537 | 2004 FA_{173} | — | January 10, 2007 | Mount Lemmon | Mount Lemmon Survey | · | 590 m | MPC · JPL |
| 568538 | 2004 FM_{174} | — | February 26, 2009 | Catalina | CSS | · | 2.2 km | MPC · JPL |
| 568539 | 2004 FW_{174} | — | October 12, 2007 | Kitt Peak | Spacewatch | · | 1.8 km | MPC · JPL |
| 568540 | 2004 FM_{175} | — | February 1, 2009 | Kitt Peak | Spacewatch | · | 1.8 km | MPC · JPL |
| 568541 | 2004 FU_{175} | — | February 10, 2014 | Haleakala | Pan-STARRS 1 | · | 1.6 km | MPC · JPL |
| 568542 | 2004 FZ_{175} | — | September 19, 2006 | Kitt Peak | Spacewatch | · | 2.8 km | MPC · JPL |
| 568543 | 2004 FP_{176} | — | April 23, 2015 | Kitt Peak | Spacewatch | EOS | 1.6 km | MPC · JPL |
| 568544 | 2004 FQ_{176} | — | April 5, 2014 | Haleakala | Pan-STARRS 1 | · | 1.5 km | MPC · JPL |
| 568545 | 2004 FW_{176} | — | December 8, 2015 | Mount Lemmon | Mount Lemmon Survey | · | 970 m | MPC · JPL |
| 568546 | 2004 FA_{177} | — | February 9, 2016 | Kitt Peak | Spacewatch | · | 2.3 km | MPC · JPL |
| 568547 | 2004 FB_{177} | — | June 26, 2015 | Haleakala | Pan-STARRS 1 | · | 570 m | MPC · JPL |
| 568548 | 2004 FO_{177} | — | August 2, 2011 | Haleakala | Pan-STARRS 1 | EOS | 1.5 km | MPC · JPL |
| 568549 | 2004 FW_{177} | — | March 26, 2004 | Kitt Peak | Spacewatch | H | 450 m | MPC · JPL |
| 568550 | 2004 GG_{10} | — | April 12, 2004 | Kitt Peak | Spacewatch | NYS | 580 m | MPC · JPL |
| 568551 | 2004 GM_{12} | — | April 9, 2004 | Siding Spring | SSS | · | 1.8 km | MPC · JPL |
| 568552 | 2004 GW_{21} | — | March 17, 2004 | Socorro | LINEAR | · | 760 m | MPC · JPL |
| 568553 | 2004 GT_{48} | — | April 12, 2004 | Kitt Peak | Spacewatch | · | 890 m | MPC · JPL |
| 568554 | 2004 GM_{54} | — | April 13, 2004 | Kitt Peak | Spacewatch | · | 1.7 km | MPC · JPL |
| 568555 | 2004 GZ_{54} | — | April 13, 2004 | Kitt Peak | Spacewatch | NYS | 790 m | MPC · JPL |
| 568556 | 2004 GB_{60} | — | April 13, 2004 | Palomar | NEAT | · | 730 m | MPC · JPL |
| 568557 | 2004 GV_{68} | — | April 13, 2004 | Kitt Peak | Spacewatch | EOS | 1.6 km | MPC · JPL |
| 568558 | 2004 GN_{70} | — | April 13, 2004 | Kitt Peak | Spacewatch | · | 920 m | MPC · JPL |
| 568559 | 2004 GJ_{89} | — | January 10, 2007 | Kitt Peak | Spacewatch | · | 1.1 km | MPC · JPL |
| 568560 | 2004 GV_{89} | — | February 23, 2015 | Haleakala | Pan-STARRS 1 | TIR | 2.9 km | MPC · JPL |
| 568561 | 2004 GU_{90} | — | April 15, 2015 | Mount Lemmon | Mount Lemmon Survey | H | 450 m | MPC · JPL |
| 568562 | 2004 GH_{91} | — | October 29, 2011 | Kitt Peak | Spacewatch | HOF | 2.2 km | MPC · JPL |
| 568563 | 2004 GQ_{91} | — | March 26, 2008 | Mount Lemmon | Mount Lemmon Survey | · | 1.2 km | MPC · JPL |
| 568564 | 2004 HQ_{8} | — | July 25, 2001 | Haleakala | NEAT | · | 690 m | MPC · JPL |
| 568565 | 2004 HB_{21} | — | April 20, 2004 | Socorro | LINEAR | EOS | 2.2 km | MPC · JPL |
| 568566 | 2004 HW_{22} | — | April 16, 2004 | Kitt Peak | Spacewatch | · | 2.1 km | MPC · JPL |
| 568567 | 2004 HF_{35} | — | March 29, 2004 | Kitt Peak | Spacewatch | LEO | 1.5 km | MPC · JPL |
| 568568 | 2004 HR_{41} | — | April 20, 2004 | Kitt Peak | Spacewatch | · | 2.1 km | MPC · JPL |
| 568569 | 2004 HX_{58} | — | April 24, 2004 | Kitt Peak | Spacewatch | · | 2.2 km | MPC · JPL |
| 568570 | 2004 HD_{69} | — | April 22, 2004 | Kitt Peak | Spacewatch | · | 1.3 km | MPC · JPL |
| 568571 | 2004 HU_{69} | — | April 22, 2004 | Kitt Peak | Spacewatch | · | 2.6 km | MPC · JPL |
| 568572 | 2004 HL_{70} | — | April 24, 2004 | Kitt Peak | Spacewatch | · | 810 m | MPC · JPL |
| 568573 | 2004 HN_{79} | — | April 26, 2004 | Mauna Kea | Survey, C. L., J. J. Kavelaars | cubewano (hot) | 182 km | MPC · JPL |
| 568574 | 2004 HS_{79} | — | April 20, 2004 | Kitt Peak | Spacewatch | · | 1.8 km | MPC · JPL |
| 568575 | 2004 HC_{80} | — | April 16, 2004 | Kitt Peak | Spacewatch | · | 1.6 km | MPC · JPL |
| 568576 | 2004 HE_{80} | — | March 10, 2007 | Eskridge | G. Hug | · | 700 m | MPC · JPL |
| 568577 | 2004 HL_{80} | — | April 19, 2004 | Kitt Peak | Spacewatch | · | 2.0 km | MPC · JPL |
| 568578 | 2004 HN_{80} | — | October 13, 2005 | Kitt Peak | Spacewatch | · | 1.0 km | MPC · JPL |
| 568579 | 2004 HS_{80} | — | May 14, 2015 | Haleakala | Pan-STARRS 1 | · | 3.7 km | MPC · JPL |
| 568580 | 2004 HT_{80} | — | March 10, 2008 | Mount Lemmon | Mount Lemmon Survey | · | 980 m | MPC · JPL |
| 568581 | 2004 HB_{81} | — | February 27, 2009 | Kitt Peak | Spacewatch | · | 1.7 km | MPC · JPL |
| 568582 | 2004 HC_{81} | — | April 4, 2008 | Mount Lemmon | Mount Lemmon Survey | · | 1.5 km | MPC · JPL |
| 568583 | 2004 HH_{81} | — | April 19, 2004 | Kitt Peak | Spacewatch | · | 930 m | MPC · JPL |
| 568584 | 2004 HT_{81} | — | December 8, 2012 | Mount Lemmon | Mount Lemmon Survey | EOS | 1.8 km | MPC · JPL |
| 568585 | 2004 HG_{82} | — | February 16, 2012 | Haleakala | Pan-STARRS 1 | · | 850 m | MPC · JPL |
| 568586 | 2004 HS_{82} | — | December 12, 2015 | Haleakala | Pan-STARRS 1 | · | 1.8 km | MPC · JPL |
| 568587 | 2004 HT_{82} | — | October 21, 2015 | Haleakala | Pan-STARRS 1 | H | 430 m | MPC · JPL |
| 568588 | 2004 HE_{83} | — | December 27, 2014 | Haleakala | Pan-STARRS 1 | PHO | 700 m | MPC · JPL |
| 568589 | 2004 HC_{85} | — | February 2, 2009 | Mount Lemmon | Mount Lemmon Survey | · | 2.6 km | MPC · JPL |
| 568590 | 2004 HG_{85} | — | April 20, 2004 | Siding Spring | SSS | EOS | 2.2 km | MPC · JPL |
| 568591 | 2004 HN_{85} | — | April 30, 2004 | Kitt Peak | Spacewatch | EOS | 1.7 km | MPC · JPL |
| 568592 | 2004 JF_{39} | — | May 14, 2004 | Kitt Peak | Spacewatch | LIX | 2.6 km | MPC · JPL |
| 568593 | 2004 JE_{40} | — | May 14, 2004 | Kitt Peak | Spacewatch | · | 940 m | MPC · JPL |
| 568594 | 2004 JP_{50} | — | May 14, 2004 | Kitt Peak | Spacewatch | TIR | 2.6 km | MPC · JPL |
| 568595 | 2004 JY_{51} | — | May 14, 2004 | Socorro | LINEAR | · | 1.5 km | MPC · JPL |
| 568596 | 2004 JF_{57} | — | July 11, 2016 | Haleakala | Pan-STARRS 1 | · | 2.3 km | MPC · JPL |
| 568597 | 2004 JJ_{57} | — | October 21, 2007 | Mount Lemmon | Mount Lemmon Survey | · | 2.3 km | MPC · JPL |
| 568598 | 2004 JS_{57} | — | February 12, 2011 | Kitt Peak | Spacewatch | · | 980 m | MPC · JPL |
| 568599 | 2004 JW_{57} | — | December 15, 2006 | Kitt Peak | Spacewatch | · | 1.2 km | MPC · JPL |
| 568600 | 2004 JY_{57} | — | February 25, 2014 | Kitt Peak | Spacewatch | · | 2.2 km | MPC · JPL |

== 568601–568700 ==
back to top

| Designation | | | Discovery | | | Properties | | Ref |
| Permanent | Provisional | Named after | Date | Site | Discoverer(s) | Category | Diam. | Ref |
|---|---|---|---|---|---|---|---|---|
| 568601 | 2004 JA_{58} | — | October 28, 2005 | Kitt Peak | Spacewatch | · | 580 m | MPC · JPL |
| 568602 | 2004 KO_{11} | — | May 20, 2004 | Kitt Peak | Spacewatch | EUN | 1.1 km | MPC · JPL |
| 568603 | 2004 KC_{20} | — | May 21, 2004 | Campo Imperatore | CINEOS | · | 3.1 km | MPC · JPL |
| 568604 | 2004 KD_{20} | — | September 5, 2008 | Kitt Peak | Spacewatch | · | 570 m | MPC · JPL |
| 568605 | 2004 KF_{20} | — | April 29, 2014 | Kitt Peak | Spacewatch | · | 620 m | MPC · JPL |
| 568606 | 2004 KH_{20} | — | February 9, 2016 | Mount Lemmon | Mount Lemmon Survey | · | 970 m | MPC · JPL |
| 568607 | 2004 KT_{20} | — | September 18, 2006 | Kitt Peak | Spacewatch | · | 2.5 km | MPC · JPL |
| 568608 | 2004 KK_{21} | — | April 1, 2014 | Mount Lemmon | Mount Lemmon Survey | EOS | 1.9 km | MPC · JPL |
| 568609 | 2004 KX_{21} | — | March 27, 2008 | Mount Lemmon | Mount Lemmon Survey | · | 990 m | MPC · JPL |
| 568610 | 2004 KB_{22} | — | April 24, 2014 | Mount Lemmon | Mount Lemmon Survey | · | 1.9 km | MPC · JPL |
| 568611 | 2004 LQ_{14} | — | June 11, 2004 | Kitt Peak | Spacewatch | · | 1.1 km | MPC · JPL |
| 568612 | 2004 LM_{26} | — | June 12, 2004 | Kitt Peak | Spacewatch | · | 920 m | MPC · JPL |
| 568613 | 2004 LL_{27} | — | June 13, 2004 | Kitt Peak | Spacewatch | · | 1.0 km | MPC · JPL |
| 568614 | 2004 LA_{32} | — | June 14, 2004 | Kitt Peak | Spacewatch | · | 1.6 km | MPC · JPL |
| 568615 | 2004 LC_{32} | — | April 30, 2014 | Haleakala | Pan-STARRS 1 | · | 540 m | MPC · JPL |
| 568616 | 2004 LG_{32} | — | March 6, 2016 | Haleakala | Pan-STARRS 1 | · | 970 m | MPC · JPL |
| 568617 | 2004 LK_{32} | — | December 30, 2007 | Kitt Peak | Spacewatch | · | 2.4 km | MPC · JPL |
| 568618 | 2004 LM_{32} | — | December 11, 2012 | Mount Lemmon | Mount Lemmon Survey | · | 2.3 km | MPC · JPL |
| 568619 | 2004 MK_{2} | — | June 16, 2004 | Kitt Peak | Spacewatch | · | 2.2 km | MPC · JPL |
| 568620 | 2004 MX_{6} | — | May 28, 2004 | Kitt Peak | Spacewatch | · | 1.8 km | MPC · JPL |
| 568621 | 2004 MZ_{8} | — | October 1, 1995 | Kitt Peak | Spacewatch | · | 2.7 km | MPC · JPL |
| 568622 | 2004 MR_{9} | — | November 27, 2013 | Haleakala | Pan-STARRS 1 | · | 1.1 km | MPC · JPL |
| 568623 | 2004 MT_{9} | — | April 11, 2016 | Haleakala | Pan-STARRS 1 | · | 1.1 km | MPC · JPL |
| 568624 | 2004 NN_{32} | — | July 15, 2004 | Cerro Tololo | Deep Ecliptic Survey | · | 1.4 km | MPC · JPL |
| 568625 | 2004 NY_{33} | — | July 15, 2004 | Siding Spring | R. H. McNaught | URS | 4.2 km | MPC · JPL |
| 568626 | 2004 OH_{1} | — | July 16, 2004 | Socorro | LINEAR | · | 1.2 km | MPC · JPL |
| 568627 | 2004 ON_{8} | — | July 16, 2004 | Socorro | LINEAR | · | 1.5 km | MPC · JPL |
| 568628 | 2004 OZ_{15} | — | February 7, 2011 | Mount Lemmon | Mount Lemmon Survey | · | 1.3 km | MPC · JPL |
| 568629 | 2004 OA_{16} | — | February 8, 2013 | Haleakala | Pan-STARRS 1 | · | 2.8 km | MPC · JPL |
| 568630 | 2004 OD_{16} | — | April 11, 2016 | Haleakala | Pan-STARRS 1 | · | 1.2 km | MPC · JPL |
| 568631 | 2004 PC_{1} | — | August 6, 2004 | Palomar | NEAT | · | 740 m | MPC · JPL |
| 568632 | 2004 PN_{2} | — | August 7, 2004 | Great Shefford | Birtwhistle, P. | · | 1.5 km | MPC · JPL |
| 568633 | 2004 PD_{4} | — | August 4, 2004 | Palomar | NEAT | · | 1 km | MPC · JPL |
| 568634 | 2004 PC_{11} | — | August 7, 2004 | Palomar | NEAT | · | 1.9 km | MPC · JPL |
| 568635 | 2004 PT_{12} | — | August 7, 2004 | Palomar | NEAT | · | 610 m | MPC · JPL |
| 568636 | 2004 PE_{13} | — | August 7, 2004 | Palomar | NEAT | · | 1.1 km | MPC · JPL |
| 568637 | 2004 PO_{15} | — | August 7, 2004 | Palomar | NEAT | (1547) | 1.7 km | MPC · JPL |
| 568638 | 2004 PK_{37} | — | August 9, 2004 | Socorro | LINEAR | EUP | 3.1 km | MPC · JPL |
| 568639 | 2004 PF_{43} | — | August 6, 2004 | Palomar | NEAT | EUN | 810 m | MPC · JPL |
| 568640 | 2004 PM_{44} | — | September 20, 2000 | Haleakala | NEAT | · | 1.2 km | MPC · JPL |
| 568641 | 2004 PS_{44} | — | August 7, 2004 | Palomar | NEAT | · | 670 m | MPC · JPL |
| 568642 | 2004 PW_{44} | — | August 7, 2004 | Palomar | NEAT | · | 560 m | MPC · JPL |
| 568643 | 2004 PA_{52} | — | August 8, 2004 | Socorro | LINEAR | · | 1.5 km | MPC · JPL |
| 568644 | 2004 PC_{68} | — | August 6, 2004 | Palomar | NEAT | · | 1.3 km | MPC · JPL |
| 568645 | 2004 PZ_{69} | — | August 7, 2004 | Palomar | NEAT | · | 1.4 km | MPC · JPL |
| 568646 | 2004 PN_{86} | — | August 9, 2004 | Socorro | LINEAR | · | 3.2 km | MPC · JPL |
| 568647 | 2004 PJ_{87} | — | February 21, 2002 | Kitt Peak | Spacewatch | · | 3.4 km | MPC · JPL |
| 568648 | 2004 PK_{87} | — | August 11, 2004 | Socorro | LINEAR | ERI | 1.5 km | MPC · JPL |
| 568649 | 2004 PD_{96} | — | August 11, 2004 | Socorro | LINEAR | · | 1.3 km | MPC · JPL |
| 568650 | 2004 PA_{111} | — | August 14, 2004 | Cerro Tololo | Deep Ecliptic Survey | · | 1.4 km | MPC · JPL |
| 568651 | 2004 PK_{114} | — | August 8, 2004 | Palomar | NEAT | · | 570 m | MPC · JPL |
| 568652 | 2004 PL_{116} | — | August 12, 2004 | Mauna Kea | P. A. Wiegert | · | 1.5 km | MPC · JPL |
| 568653 | 2004 PN_{118} | — | August 7, 2004 | Palomar | NEAT | · | 1.2 km | MPC · JPL |
| 568654 | 2004 PZ_{118} | — | December 25, 2005 | Mount Lemmon | Mount Lemmon Survey | EUN | 1.2 km | MPC · JPL |
| 568655 | 2004 PE_{119} | — | March 15, 2016 | Haleakala | Pan-STARRS 1 | · | 1.7 km | MPC · JPL |
| 568656 | 2004 PJ_{119} | — | January 10, 2013 | Haleakala | Pan-STARRS 1 | · | 2.8 km | MPC · JPL |
| 568657 | 2004 PK_{119} | — | August 15, 2004 | Cerro Tololo | Deep Ecliptic Survey | · | 2.1 km | MPC · JPL |
| 568658 | 2004 QE_{2} | — | August 19, 2004 | Reedy Creek | J. Broughton | (1547) | 1.1 km | MPC · JPL |
| 568659 | 2004 QO_{13} | — | August 21, 2004 | Uppsala-Kvistaberg | Kvistaberg | MAR | 1.5 km | MPC · JPL |
| 568660 | 2004 QJ_{23} | — | August 22, 2004 | Mauna Kea | Veillet, C. | VER | 2.7 km | MPC · JPL |
| 568661 | 2004 QP_{23} | — | February 9, 2002 | Kitt Peak | Spacewatch | · | 2.5 km | MPC · JPL |
| 568662 | 2004 QO_{28} | — | August 25, 2004 | Kitt Peak | Spacewatch | · | 2.2 km | MPC · JPL |
| 568663 | 2004 QS_{29} | — | July 29, 2008 | Mount Lemmon | Mount Lemmon Survey | · | 1.4 km | MPC · JPL |
| 568664 | 2004 QW_{29} | — | May 1, 2014 | Mount Lemmon | Mount Lemmon Survey | EUP | 3.5 km | MPC · JPL |
| 568665 | 2004 QX_{29} | — | August 22, 2004 | Kitt Peak | Spacewatch | PHO | 820 m | MPC · JPL |
| 568666 | 2004 QD_{30} | — | September 30, 2010 | Mount Lemmon | Mount Lemmon Survey | · | 2.2 km | MPC · JPL |
| 568667 | 2004 QJ_{30} | — | October 3, 2013 | Catalina | CSS | · | 1.4 km | MPC · JPL |
| 568668 | 2004 QO_{30} | — | June 19, 2015 | Haleakala | Pan-STARRS 1 | · | 2.3 km | MPC · JPL |
| 568669 | 2004 QP_{30} | — | April 15, 2012 | Haleakala | Pan-STARRS 1 | · | 1.3 km | MPC · JPL |
| 568670 | 2004 QW_{30} | — | August 25, 2004 | Kitt Peak | Spacewatch | · | 1.1 km | MPC · JPL |
| 568671 | 2004 QX_{30} | — | November 10, 2013 | Mount Lemmon | Mount Lemmon Survey | · | 1.2 km | MPC · JPL |
| 568672 | 2004 QK_{31} | — | October 25, 2013 | Mount Lemmon | Mount Lemmon Survey | · | 960 m | MPC · JPL |
| 568673 | 2004 QV_{31} | — | February 3, 2013 | Haleakala | Pan-STARRS 1 | · | 2.8 km | MPC · JPL |
| 568674 | 2004 QX_{31} | — | October 20, 2011 | Mount Lemmon | Mount Lemmon Survey | · | 630 m | MPC · JPL |
| 568675 | 2004 QL_{32} | — | April 25, 2016 | Haleakala | Pan-STARRS 1 | MAR | 1.0 km | MPC · JPL |
| 568676 | 2004 QO_{32} | — | December 25, 2005 | Kitt Peak | Spacewatch | V | 600 m | MPC · JPL |
| 568677 | 2004 QD_{33} | — | October 25, 2011 | Haleakala | Pan-STARRS 1 | · | 3.1 km | MPC · JPL |
| 568678 | 2004 QF_{33} | — | January 7, 2006 | Kitt Peak | Spacewatch | EUN | 1.1 km | MPC · JPL |
| 568679 | 2004 QG_{33} | — | November 25, 2005 | Kitt Peak | Spacewatch | VER | 2.5 km | MPC · JPL |
| 568680 | 2004 QH_{33} | — | August 22, 2004 | Kitt Peak | Spacewatch | · | 1.4 km | MPC · JPL |
| 568681 | 2004 QQ_{34} | — | August 22, 2004 | Kitt Peak | Spacewatch | · | 1.4 km | MPC · JPL |
| 568682 | 2004 QS_{35} | — | March 11, 2008 | Mount Lemmon | Mount Lemmon Survey | · | 1.8 km | MPC · JPL |
| 568683 | 2004 QU_{35} | — | March 17, 2013 | Mount Lemmon | Mount Lemmon Survey | · | 1.8 km | MPC · JPL |
| 568684 | 2004 QX_{35} | — | September 17, 2017 | Haleakala | Pan-STARRS 1 | · | 1.1 km | MPC · JPL |
| 568685 | 2004 RN_{1} | — | September 4, 2004 | Palomar | NEAT | · | 3.0 km | MPC · JPL |
| 568686 | 2004 RS_{2} | — | September 7, 2004 | Kitt Peak | Spacewatch | · | 720 m | MPC · JPL |
| 568687 | 2004 RX_{17} | — | September 7, 2004 | Kitt Peak | Spacewatch | · | 1.2 km | MPC · JPL |
| 568688 | 2004 RY_{32} | — | September 7, 2004 | Kitt Peak | Spacewatch | (5) | 1.4 km | MPC · JPL |
| 568689 | 2004 RZ_{38} | — | August 8, 2004 | Palomar | NEAT | · | 1.5 km | MPC · JPL |
| 568690 | 2004 RS_{45} | — | September 8, 2004 | Socorro | LINEAR | · | 630 m | MPC · JPL |
| 568691 | 2004 RW_{58} | — | September 8, 2004 | Socorro | LINEAR | · | 860 m | MPC · JPL |
| 568692 | 2004 RQ_{87} | — | September 7, 2004 | Palomar | NEAT | V | 590 m | MPC · JPL |
| 568693 | 2004 RF_{97} | — | September 8, 2004 | Socorro | LINEAR | · | 1.6 km | MPC · JPL |
| 568694 | 2004 RL_{98} | — | August 13, 2004 | Palomar | NEAT | · | 1.7 km | MPC · JPL |
| 568695 | 2004 RD_{102} | — | September 8, 2004 | Socorro | LINEAR | · | 1.7 km | MPC · JPL |
| 568696 | 2004 RL_{104} | — | September 8, 2004 | Palomar | NEAT | · | 2.0 km | MPC · JPL |
| 568697 | 2004 RV_{104} | — | September 8, 2004 | Palomar | NEAT | · | 1.1 km | MPC · JPL |
| 568698 | 2004 RW_{104} | — | September 8, 2004 | Palomar | NEAT | · | 680 m | MPC · JPL |
| 568699 | 2004 RQ_{108} | — | August 25, 2004 | Kitt Peak | Spacewatch | URS | 2.9 km | MPC · JPL |
| 568700 | 2004 RB_{118} | — | September 7, 2004 | Kitt Peak | Spacewatch | · | 3.3 km | MPC · JPL |

== 568701–568800 ==
back to top

| Designation | | | Discovery | | | Properties | | Ref |
| Permanent | Provisional | Named after | Date | Site | Discoverer(s) | Category | Diam. | Ref |
|---|---|---|---|---|---|---|---|---|
| 568701 | 2004 RY_{118} | — | September 7, 2004 | Palomar | NEAT | · | 1.4 km | MPC · JPL |
| 568702 | 2004 RB_{119} | — | September 7, 2004 | Palomar | NEAT | · | 1.5 km | MPC · JPL |
| 568703 | 2004 RZ_{121} | — | September 7, 2004 | Kitt Peak | Spacewatch | · | 1.1 km | MPC · JPL |
| 568704 | 2004 RG_{132} | — | September 7, 2004 | Kitt Peak | Spacewatch | · | 1.6 km | MPC · JPL |
| 568705 | 2004 RM_{134} | — | August 15, 2004 | Cerro Tololo | Deep Ecliptic Survey | · | 1.2 km | MPC · JPL |
| 568706 | 2004 RW_{136} | — | September 8, 2004 | Campo Imperatore | CINEOS | · | 960 m | MPC · JPL |
| 568707 | 2004 RK_{141} | — | September 8, 2004 | Socorro | LINEAR | · | 870 m | MPC · JPL |
| 568708 | 2004 RL_{177} | — | September 10, 2004 | Socorro | LINEAR | · | 650 m | MPC · JPL |
| 568709 | 2004 RB_{186} | — | September 10, 2004 | Socorro | LINEAR | · | 1.2 km | MPC · JPL |
| 568710 | 2004 RM_{203} | — | September 11, 2004 | Kitt Peak | Spacewatch | (194) | 1.4 km | MPC · JPL |
| 568711 | 2004 RL_{207} | — | September 11, 2004 | Socorro | LINEAR | JUN | 1.1 km | MPC · JPL |
| 568712 | 2004 RH_{213} | — | September 11, 2004 | Socorro | LINEAR | · | 1.6 km | MPC · JPL |
| 568713 | 2004 RD_{215} | — | September 11, 2004 | Socorro | LINEAR | · | 1.4 km | MPC · JPL |
| 568714 | 2004 RG_{217} | — | September 11, 2004 | Socorro | LINEAR | · | 2.8 km | MPC · JPL |
| 568715 | 2004 RL_{237} | — | September 10, 2004 | Kitt Peak | Spacewatch | · | 1.4 km | MPC · JPL |
| 568716 | 2004 RK_{239} | — | September 10, 2004 | Kitt Peak | Spacewatch | · | 680 m | MPC · JPL |
| 568717 | 2004 RB_{240} | — | September 10, 2004 | Kitt Peak | Spacewatch | HNS | 960 m | MPC · JPL |
| 568718 | 2004 RA_{241} | — | September 10, 2004 | Kitt Peak | Spacewatch | · | 1.2 km | MPC · JPL |
| 568719 | 2004 RA_{242} | — | September 10, 2004 | Kitt Peak | Spacewatch | · | 1.2 km | MPC · JPL |
| 568720 | 2004 RE_{245} | — | September 10, 2004 | Kitt Peak | Spacewatch | (895) | 4.2 km | MPC · JPL |
| 568721 | 2004 RF_{245} | — | September 10, 2004 | Kitt Peak | Spacewatch | · | 600 m | MPC · JPL |
| 568722 | 2004 RE_{253} | — | September 15, 2004 | Three Buttes | Jones, G. R. | · | 1.9 km | MPC · JPL |
| 568723 | 2004 RH_{260} | — | September 10, 2004 | Kitt Peak | Spacewatch | · | 1.7 km | MPC · JPL |
| 568724 | 2004 RH_{263} | — | September 10, 2004 | Kitt Peak | Spacewatch | · | 1.3 km | MPC · JPL |
| 568725 | 2004 RK_{264} | — | September 10, 2004 | Kitt Peak | Spacewatch | · | 1.2 km | MPC · JPL |
| 568726 | 2004 RE_{267} | — | September 11, 2004 | Kitt Peak | Spacewatch | WIT | 780 m | MPC · JPL |
| 568727 | 2004 RF_{267} | — | September 11, 2004 | Kitt Peak | Spacewatch | AGN | 950 m | MPC · JPL |
| 568728 | 2004 RT_{267} | — | September 11, 2004 | Kitt Peak | Spacewatch | WIT | 770 m | MPC · JPL |
| 568729 | 2004 RL_{271} | — | September 11, 2004 | Kitt Peak | Spacewatch | · | 1.8 km | MPC · JPL |
| 568730 | 2004 RB_{275} | — | September 12, 2004 | Kitt Peak | Spacewatch | EUN | 1.1 km | MPC · JPL |
| 568731 | 2004 RZ_{276} | — | September 13, 2004 | Kitt Peak | Spacewatch | HYG | 2.4 km | MPC · JPL |
| 568732 | 2004 RR_{278} | — | September 15, 2004 | Kitt Peak | Spacewatch | · | 1.4 km | MPC · JPL |
| 568733 | 2004 RL_{297} | — | September 11, 2004 | Kitt Peak | Spacewatch | · | 1.3 km | MPC · JPL |
| 568734 | 2004 RX_{303} | — | September 12, 2004 | Kitt Peak | Spacewatch | · | 1.5 km | MPC · JPL |
| 568735 | 2004 RN_{314} | — | September 9, 2004 | Socorro | LINEAR | · | 840 m | MPC · JPL |
| 568736 | 2004 RQ_{319} | — | September 13, 2004 | Socorro | LINEAR | EUN | 1.0 km | MPC · JPL |
| 568737 | 2004 RJ_{324} | — | September 13, 2004 | Kitt Peak | Spacewatch | · | 670 m | MPC · JPL |
| 568738 | 2004 RH_{329} | — | September 15, 2004 | Kitt Peak | Spacewatch | MIS | 2.3 km | MPC · JPL |
| 568739 | 2004 RH_{331} | — | September 15, 2004 | Kitt Peak | Spacewatch | · | 1.6 km | MPC · JPL |
| 568740 | 2004 RD_{332} | — | September 14, 2004 | Palomar | NEAT | · | 2.5 km | MPC · JPL |
| 568741 | 2004 RE_{336} | — | September 15, 2004 | Kitt Peak | Spacewatch | · | 460 m | MPC · JPL |
| 568742 | 2004 RS_{357} | — | September 4, 2010 | Kitt Peak | Spacewatch | · | 2.9 km | MPC · JPL |
| 568743 | 2004 RZ_{357} | — | November 21, 2009 | Mount Lemmon | Mount Lemmon Survey | · | 1.5 km | MPC · JPL |
| 568744 | 2004 RE_{358} | — | October 23, 2009 | Kitt Peak | Spacewatch | · | 1.5 km | MPC · JPL |
| 568745 | 2004 RN_{358} | — | October 10, 2004 | Kitt Peak | Deep Ecliptic Survey | · | 2.3 km | MPC · JPL |
| 568746 | 2004 RO_{358} | — | January 23, 2015 | Haleakala | Pan-STARRS 1 | · | 1.4 km | MPC · JPL |
| 568747 | 2004 RP_{358} | — | September 7, 2004 | Kitt Peak | Spacewatch | · | 2.5 km | MPC · JPL |
| 568748 | 2004 RQ_{358} | — | September 12, 2004 | Kitt Peak | Spacewatch | · | 3.1 km | MPC · JPL |
| 568749 | 2004 RB_{359} | — | September 6, 2008 | Mount Lemmon | Mount Lemmon Survey | · | 1.6 km | MPC · JPL |
| 568750 | 2004 RE_{359} | — | November 6, 2013 | Haleakala | Pan-STARRS 1 | · | 1.4 km | MPC · JPL |
| 568751 | 2004 RJ_{359} | — | October 7, 2004 | Anderson Mesa | LONEOS | · | 660 m | MPC · JPL |
| 568752 | 2004 RQ_{359} | — | December 31, 2008 | Mount Lemmon | Mount Lemmon Survey | (2076) | 660 m | MPC · JPL |
| 568753 | 2004 RQ_{360} | — | October 5, 2013 | Haleakala | Pan-STARRS 1 | · | 1.1 km | MPC · JPL |
| 568754 | 2004 RO_{362} | — | August 13, 2004 | Cerro Tololo | Deep Ecliptic Survey | · | 1.1 km | MPC · JPL |
| 568755 | 2004 RT_{363} | — | February 15, 2013 | Haleakala | Pan-STARRS 1 | · | 2.5 km | MPC · JPL |
| 568756 | 2004 RO_{365} | — | September 12, 2004 | Kitt Peak | Spacewatch | · | 2.5 km | MPC · JPL |
| 568757 | 2004 RB_{366} | — | September 11, 2004 | Kitt Peak | Spacewatch | THM | 1.7 km | MPC · JPL |
| 568758 | 2004 SM_{13} | — | August 23, 2004 | Anderson Mesa | LONEOS | · | 1.0 km | MPC · JPL |
| 568759 | 2004 SZ_{24} | — | September 21, 2004 | Kitt Peak | Spacewatch | · | 760 m | MPC · JPL |
| 568760 | 2004 SA_{25} | — | September 21, 2004 | Kitt Peak | Spacewatch | · | 1.7 km | MPC · JPL |
| 568761 | 2004 SB_{28} | — | September 16, 2004 | Kitt Peak | Spacewatch | · | 2.3 km | MPC · JPL |
| 568762 | 2004 SM_{52} | — | September 18, 2004 | Socorro | LINEAR | · | 610 m | MPC · JPL |
| 568763 | 2004 SA_{59} | — | September 16, 2004 | Kitt Peak | Spacewatch | · | 1.5 km | MPC · JPL |
| 568764 | 2004 SR_{61} | — | September 22, 2004 | Kitt Peak | Spacewatch | · | 1.5 km | MPC · JPL |
| 568765 | 2004 SC_{63} | — | April 9, 2014 | Haleakala | Pan-STARRS 1 | · | 2.5 km | MPC · JPL |
| 568766 | 2004 SK_{63} | — | March 13, 2013 | Kitt Peak | Spacewatch | · | 2.1 km | MPC · JPL |
| 568767 | 2004 SZ_{63} | — | March 4, 2016 | Haleakala | Pan-STARRS 1 | · | 1.3 km | MPC · JPL |
| 568768 | 2004 SU_{65} | — | September 17, 2004 | Kitt Peak | Spacewatch | EUN | 1.0 km | MPC · JPL |
| 568769 | 2004 TR_{5} | — | October 5, 2004 | Kitt Peak | Spacewatch | URS | 2.4 km | MPC · JPL |
| 568770 | 2004 TT_{26} | — | October 4, 2004 | Kitt Peak | Spacewatch | · | 550 m | MPC · JPL |
| 568771 | 2004 TD_{30} | — | October 4, 2004 | Kitt Peak | Spacewatch | · | 2.6 km | MPC · JPL |
| 568772 | 2004 TF_{30} | — | October 4, 2004 | Kitt Peak | Spacewatch | · | 1.3 km | MPC · JPL |
| 568773 | 2004 TS_{36} | — | October 4, 2004 | Kitt Peak | Spacewatch | · | 1.4 km | MPC · JPL |
| 568774 | 2004 TQ_{42} | — | October 4, 2004 | Kitt Peak | Spacewatch | · | 1.9 km | MPC · JPL |
| 568775 | 2004 TE_{81} | — | October 5, 2004 | Kitt Peak | Spacewatch | · | 1.2 km | MPC · JPL |
| 568776 | 2004 TE_{83} | — | October 5, 2004 | Kitt Peak | Spacewatch | · | 710 m | MPC · JPL |
| 568777 | 2004 TJ_{87} | — | October 5, 2004 | Kitt Peak | Spacewatch | EUN | 870 m | MPC · JPL |
| 568778 | 2004 TC_{92} | — | September 17, 2004 | Kitt Peak | Spacewatch | EOS | 2.1 km | MPC · JPL |
| 568779 | 2004 TH_{95} | — | October 5, 2004 | Kitt Peak | Spacewatch | PAD | 1.6 km | MPC · JPL |
| 568780 | 2004 TT_{96} | — | October 5, 2004 | Kitt Peak | Spacewatch | · | 810 m | MPC · JPL |
| 568781 | 2004 TB_{97} | — | October 5, 2004 | Kitt Peak | Spacewatch | · | 1.4 km | MPC · JPL |
| 568782 | 2004 TF_{104} | — | October 8, 2004 | Socorro | LINEAR | HNS | 1.4 km | MPC · JPL |
| 568783 | 2004 TV_{112} | — | October 8, 2004 | Socorro | LINEAR | LUT | 5.5 km | MPC · JPL |
| 568784 | 2004 TY_{112} | — | October 8, 2004 | Anderson Mesa | LONEOS | LIX | 4.5 km | MPC · JPL |
| 568785 | 2004 TS_{114} | — | October 8, 2004 | Kitt Peak | Spacewatch | · | 1.5 km | MPC · JPL |
| 568786 | 2004 TJ_{123} | — | October 7, 2004 | Anderson Mesa | LONEOS | · | 1.7 km | MPC · JPL |
| 568787 | 2004 TZ_{127} | — | September 8, 2004 | Palomar | NEAT | · | 2.3 km | MPC · JPL |
| 568788 | 2004 TK_{145} | — | October 5, 2004 | Kitt Peak | Spacewatch | · | 1.4 km | MPC · JPL |
| 568789 | 2004 TW_{147} | — | October 6, 2004 | Kitt Peak | Spacewatch | · | 2.6 km | MPC · JPL |
| 568790 | 2004 TS_{154} | — | September 15, 2004 | Kitt Peak | Spacewatch | · | 2.7 km | MPC · JPL |
| 568791 | 2004 TC_{157} | — | October 6, 2004 | Kitt Peak | Spacewatch | · | 1.5 km | MPC · JPL |
| 568792 | 2004 TP_{158} | — | October 6, 2004 | Kitt Peak | Spacewatch | · | 2.2 km | MPC · JPL |
| 568793 | 2004 TU_{164} | — | October 6, 2004 | Kitt Peak | Spacewatch | · | 1.8 km | MPC · JPL |
| 568794 | 2004 TZ_{167} | — | October 7, 2004 | Kitt Peak | Spacewatch | · | 1.2 km | MPC · JPL |
| 568795 | 2004 TX_{177} | — | October 7, 2004 | Kitt Peak | Spacewatch | H | 500 m | MPC · JPL |
| 568796 | 2004 TL_{184} | — | October 7, 2004 | Kitt Peak | Spacewatch | · | 2.2 km | MPC · JPL |
| 568797 | 2004 TK_{185} | — | October 7, 2004 | Kitt Peak | Spacewatch | · | 1.3 km | MPC · JPL |
| 568798 | 2004 TH_{190} | — | October 7, 2004 | Kitt Peak | Spacewatch | V | 440 m | MPC · JPL |
| 568799 | 2004 TJ_{193} | — | October 7, 2004 | Kitt Peak | Spacewatch | · | 1.4 km | MPC · JPL |
| 568800 | 2004 TO_{194} | — | October 7, 2004 | Kitt Peak | Spacewatch | WIT | 850 m | MPC · JPL |

== 568801–568900 ==
back to top

| Designation | | | Discovery | | | Properties | | Ref |
| Permanent | Provisional | Named after | Date | Site | Discoverer(s) | Category | Diam. | Ref |
|---|---|---|---|---|---|---|---|---|
| 568801 | 2004 TR_{195} | — | October 7, 2004 | Kitt Peak | Spacewatch | · | 530 m | MPC · JPL |
| 568802 | 2004 TH_{196} | — | October 7, 2004 | Kitt Peak | Spacewatch | · | 1.6 km | MPC · JPL |
| 568803 | 2004 TO_{200} | — | October 7, 2004 | Kitt Peak | Spacewatch | · | 1.6 km | MPC · JPL |
| 568804 | 2004 TN_{208} | — | October 7, 2004 | Kitt Peak | Spacewatch | NYS | 800 m | MPC · JPL |
| 568805 | 2004 TQ_{209} | — | October 8, 2004 | Kitt Peak | Spacewatch | · | 2.8 km | MPC · JPL |
| 568806 | 2004 TH_{215} | — | October 10, 2004 | Kitt Peak | Spacewatch | · | 1.3 km | MPC · JPL |
| 568807 | 2004 TU_{217} | — | October 5, 2004 | Kitt Peak | Spacewatch | · | 570 m | MPC · JPL |
| 568808 | 2004 TO_{221} | — | October 7, 2004 | Palomar | NEAT | · | 3.4 km | MPC · JPL |
| 568809 | 2004 TV_{222} | — | October 7, 2004 | Palomar | NEAT | · | 2.7 km | MPC · JPL |
| 568810 | 2004 TK_{225} | — | October 8, 2004 | Kitt Peak | Spacewatch | · | 2.0 km | MPC · JPL |
| 568811 | 2004 TE_{226} | — | October 8, 2004 | Kitt Peak | Spacewatch | · | 620 m | MPC · JPL |
| 568812 | 2004 TZ_{226} | — | October 8, 2004 | Kitt Peak | Spacewatch | · | 1.2 km | MPC · JPL |
| 568813 | 2004 TG_{227} | — | September 17, 1995 | Kitt Peak | Spacewatch | · | 1.2 km | MPC · JPL |
| 568814 | 2004 TO_{229} | — | September 22, 2004 | Kitt Peak | Spacewatch | EUN | 1.0 km | MPC · JPL |
| 568815 | 2004 TT_{230} | — | October 8, 2004 | Anderson Mesa | LONEOS | EUN | 1.2 km | MPC · JPL |
| 568816 | 2004 TB_{233} | — | October 8, 2004 | Kitt Peak | Spacewatch | WIT | 870 m | MPC · JPL |
| 568817 | 2004 TU_{236} | — | October 9, 2004 | Kitt Peak | Spacewatch | · | 790 m | MPC · JPL |
| 568818 | 2004 TH_{245} | — | September 24, 2004 | Kitt Peak | Spacewatch | · | 1.3 km | MPC · JPL |
| 568819 | 2004 TA_{249} | — | October 7, 2004 | Kitt Peak | Spacewatch | · | 2.5 km | MPC · JPL |
| 568820 | 2004 TY_{251} | — | October 9, 2004 | Kitt Peak | Spacewatch | (7744) | 1.2 km | MPC · JPL |
| 568821 | 2004 TC_{254} | — | October 9, 2004 | Kitt Peak | Spacewatch | · | 1.6 km | MPC · JPL |
| 568822 | 2004 TJ_{284} | — | October 8, 2004 | Kitt Peak | Spacewatch | · | 2.3 km | MPC · JPL |
| 568823 | 2004 TG_{290} | — | October 10, 2004 | Kitt Peak | Spacewatch | AGN | 840 m | MPC · JPL |
| 568824 | 2004 TZ_{306} | — | October 10, 2004 | Socorro | LINEAR | · | 1.2 km | MPC · JPL |
| 568825 | 2004 TV_{314} | — | September 23, 2004 | Kitt Peak | Spacewatch | · | 1.3 km | MPC · JPL |
| 568826 | 2004 TC_{321} | — | October 11, 2004 | Kitt Peak | Spacewatch | · | 1.3 km | MPC · JPL |
| 568827 | 2004 TN_{324} | — | October 12, 2004 | Socorro | LINEAR | · | 1.7 km | MPC · JPL |
| 568828 | 2004 TQ_{326} | — | October 14, 2004 | Palomar | NEAT | · | 2.7 km | MPC · JPL |
| 568829 | 2004 TS_{326} | — | October 14, 2004 | Palomar | NEAT | · | 800 m | MPC · JPL |
| 568830 | 2004 TN_{329} | — | October 8, 2004 | Kitt Peak | Spacewatch | · | 2.6 km | MPC · JPL |
| 568831 | 2004 TP_{336} | — | October 10, 2004 | Kitt Peak | Spacewatch | · | 1.9 km | MPC · JPL |
| 568832 | 2004 TA_{346} | — | October 15, 2004 | Socorro | LINEAR | · | 1.2 km | MPC · JPL |
| 568833 | 2004 TU_{350} | — | October 15, 2004 | Kitt Peak | Spacewatch | · | 3.1 km | MPC · JPL |
| 568834 | 2004 TQ_{357} | — | October 8, 2004 | Kitt Peak | Spacewatch | · | 2.3 km | MPC · JPL |
| 568835 | 2004 TJ_{369} | — | October 8, 2004 | Palomar | NEAT | · | 2.5 km | MPC · JPL |
| 568836 | 2004 TC_{372} | — | January 14, 2010 | Mount Lemmon | Mount Lemmon Survey | · | 1.9 km | MPC · JPL |
| 568837 | 2004 TJ_{372} | — | March 25, 2006 | Palomar | NEAT | · | 1.0 km | MPC · JPL |
| 568838 | 2004 TK_{372} | — | January 8, 2006 | Kitt Peak | Spacewatch | · | 1.7 km | MPC · JPL |
| 568839 | 2004 TV_{372} | — | February 29, 2016 | Haleakala | Pan-STARRS 1 | H | 390 m | MPC · JPL |
| 568840 | 2004 TC_{373} | — | September 29, 2011 | Kitt Peak | Spacewatch | (2076) | 690 m | MPC · JPL |
| 568841 | 2004 TH_{373} | — | October 8, 2004 | Kitt Peak | Spacewatch | (7744) | 1.2 km | MPC · JPL |
| 568842 | 2004 TK_{373} | — | November 2, 2013 | Mount Lemmon | Mount Lemmon Survey | · | 1.5 km | MPC · JPL |
| 568843 | 2004 TL_{373} | — | July 7, 2014 | Haleakala | Pan-STARRS 1 | · | 600 m | MPC · JPL |
| 568844 | 2004 TQ_{373} | — | September 3, 2013 | Mount Lemmon | Mount Lemmon Survey | · | 1.3 km | MPC · JPL |
| 568845 | 2004 TB_{374} | — | September 25, 2008 | Kitt Peak | Spacewatch | · | 1.2 km | MPC · JPL |
| 568846 | 2004 TF_{374} | — | February 16, 2015 | Haleakala | Pan-STARRS 1 | · | 1.4 km | MPC · JPL |
| 568847 | 2004 TJ_{374} | — | February 19, 2015 | Haleakala | Pan-STARRS 1 | · | 1.4 km | MPC · JPL |
| 568848 | 2004 TX_{374} | — | December 9, 2015 | Haleakala | Pan-STARRS 1 | · | 620 m | MPC · JPL |
| 568849 | 2004 TY_{374} | — | September 12, 2013 | Mount Lemmon | Mount Lemmon Survey | · | 1.5 km | MPC · JPL |
| 568850 | 2004 TS_{375} | — | September 18, 1995 | Kitt Peak | Spacewatch | · | 1.1 km | MPC · JPL |
| 568851 | 2004 TB_{376} | — | March 14, 2013 | Catalina | CSS | · | 870 m | MPC · JPL |
| 568852 | 2004 TW_{376} | — | August 15, 2013 | Haleakala | Pan-STARRS 1 | · | 1.3 km | MPC · JPL |
| 568853 | 2004 TX_{376} | — | November 1, 2013 | Mount Lemmon | Mount Lemmon Survey | · | 1.1 km | MPC · JPL |
| 568854 | 2004 TN_{377} | — | October 15, 2004 | Kitt Peak | Spacewatch | · | 1.6 km | MPC · JPL |
| 568855 | 2004 TP_{377} | — | September 29, 2009 | Mount Lemmon | Mount Lemmon Survey | · | 2.3 km | MPC · JPL |
| 568856 | 2004 TR_{379} | — | November 28, 2013 | Nogales | M. Schwartz, P. R. Holvorcem | HNS | 1.1 km | MPC · JPL |
| 568857 | 2004 TF_{380} | — | October 2, 2010 | Kitt Peak | Spacewatch | · | 2.6 km | MPC · JPL |
| 568858 | 2004 TO_{380} | — | January 17, 2015 | Mount Lemmon | Mount Lemmon Survey | · | 1.7 km | MPC · JPL |
| 568859 | 2004 TY_{380} | — | September 21, 2011 | Mount Lemmon | Mount Lemmon Survey | · | 650 m | MPC · JPL |
| 568860 | 2004 TD_{382} | — | October 7, 2004 | Kitt Peak | Spacewatch | · | 1.2 km | MPC · JPL |
| 568861 | 2004 TQ_{382} | — | November 1, 2013 | Mount Lemmon | Mount Lemmon Survey | · | 1.4 km | MPC · JPL |
| 568862 | 2004 TC_{383} | — | April 5, 2016 | Haleakala | Pan-STARRS 1 | · | 1.1 km | MPC · JPL |
| 568863 | 2004 TL_{383} | — | September 25, 1995 | Kitt Peak | Spacewatch | · | 1.3 km | MPC · JPL |
| 568864 | 2004 TM_{383} | — | November 19, 2008 | Kitt Peak | Spacewatch | ERI | 1.1 km | MPC · JPL |
| 568865 | 2004 TG_{384} | — | November 12, 2010 | Kitt Peak | Spacewatch | EOS | 1.7 km | MPC · JPL |
| 568866 | 2004 UK_{2} | — | October 18, 2004 | Socorro | LINEAR | · | 1.4 km | MPC · JPL |
| 568867 | 2004 UE_{8} | — | October 13, 2004 | Kitt Peak | Spacewatch | · | 3.9 km | MPC · JPL |
| 568868 | 2004 UN_{11} | — | September 23, 2011 | Haleakala | Pan-STARRS 1 | · | 920 m | MPC · JPL |
| 568869 | 2004 UP_{11} | — | October 23, 2004 | Kitt Peak | Spacewatch | · | 1.4 km | MPC · JPL |
| 568870 | 2004 UQ_{11} | — | October 23, 2004 | Kitt Peak | Spacewatch | H | 340 m | MPC · JPL |
| 568871 | 2004 US_{11} | — | October 23, 2004 | Kitt Peak | Spacewatch | EUN | 1.0 km | MPC · JPL |
| 568872 | 2004 UD_{12} | — | October 23, 2004 | Kitt Peak | Spacewatch | · | 450 m | MPC · JPL |
| 568873 | 2004 VV_{7} | — | November 3, 2004 | Kitt Peak | Spacewatch | · | 2.1 km | MPC · JPL |
| 568874 | 2004 VJ_{13} | — | November 3, 2004 | Palomar | NEAT | · | 2.0 km | MPC · JPL |
| 568875 | 2004 VQ_{32} | — | November 3, 2004 | Kitt Peak | Spacewatch | MIS | 1.9 km | MPC · JPL |
| 568876 | 2004 VM_{42} | — | October 23, 2004 | Kitt Peak | Spacewatch | MAS | 550 m | MPC · JPL |
| 568877 | 2004 VQ_{49} | — | November 4, 2004 | Kitt Peak | Spacewatch | · | 1.0 km | MPC · JPL |
| 568878 | 2004 VR_{58} | — | November 9, 2004 | Catalina | CSS | ADE | 2.2 km | MPC · JPL |
| 568879 | 2004 VE_{67} | — | October 10, 2004 | Kitt Peak | Deep Ecliptic Survey | · | 1.9 km | MPC · JPL |
| 568880 | 2004 VR_{73} | — | November 7, 2004 | Palomar | NEAT | EUN | 1.7 km | MPC · JPL |
| 568881 | 2004 VM_{79} | — | November 3, 2004 | Kitt Peak | Spacewatch | · | 870 m | MPC · JPL |
| 568882 | 2004 VZ_{80} | — | November 4, 2004 | Kitt Peak | Spacewatch | · | 1.7 km | MPC · JPL |
| 568883 | 2004 VR_{88} | — | November 11, 2004 | Kitt Peak | Spacewatch | · | 1.4 km | MPC · JPL |
| 568884 | 2004 VR_{89} | — | November 11, 2004 | Kitt Peak | Spacewatch | · | 540 m | MPC · JPL |
| 568885 | 2004 VF_{91} | — | July 3, 2000 | Kitt Peak | Spacewatch | · | 840 m | MPC · JPL |
| 568886 | 2004 VW_{100} | — | November 9, 2004 | Mauna Kea | Veillet, C. | · | 590 m | MPC · JPL |
| 568887 | 2004 VH_{109} | — | November 9, 2004 | Mauna Kea | Veillet, C. | · | 610 m | MPC · JPL |
| 568888 | 2004 VK_{116} | — | November 3, 2004 | Kitt Peak | Spacewatch | · | 1.4 km | MPC · JPL |
| 568889 | 2004 VW_{131} | — | October 27, 2008 | Mount Lemmon | Mount Lemmon Survey | · | 2.1 km | MPC · JPL |
| 568890 | 2004 VZ_{131} | — | November 10, 2004 | Kitt Peak | Spacewatch | · | 1.4 km | MPC · JPL |
| 568891 | 2004 VA_{132} | — | November 2, 2013 | Mount Lemmon | Mount Lemmon Survey | · | 1.6 km | MPC · JPL |
| 568892 | 2004 VB_{132} | — | February 27, 2006 | Catalina | CSS | · | 2.0 km | MPC · JPL |
| 568893 | 2004 VF_{132} | — | November 4, 2004 | Kitt Peak | Spacewatch | · | 1.4 km | MPC · JPL |
| 568894 | 2004 VJ_{133} | — | April 3, 2016 | Haleakala | Pan-STARRS 1 | · | 580 m | MPC · JPL |
| 568895 | 2004 VQ_{133} | — | May 6, 2006 | Mount Lemmon | Mount Lemmon Survey | · | 800 m | MPC · JPL |
| 568896 | 2004 VT_{133} | — | September 24, 1995 | Kitt Peak | Spacewatch | · | 1.3 km | MPC · JPL |
| 568897 | 2004 VC_{134} | — | December 29, 2014 | Mount Lemmon | Mount Lemmon Survey | · | 520 m | MPC · JPL |
| 568898 | 2004 VZ_{134} | — | October 19, 2011 | Mount Lemmon | Mount Lemmon Survey | · | 700 m | MPC · JPL |
| 568899 | 2004 VJ_{135} | — | January 21, 2015 | Haleakala | Pan-STARRS 1 | NEM | 1.9 km | MPC · JPL |
| 568900 | 2004 VL_{135} | — | October 30, 2011 | Kitt Peak | Spacewatch | · | 730 m | MPC · JPL |

== 568901–569000 ==
back to top

| Designation | | | Discovery | | | Properties | | Ref |
| Permanent | Provisional | Named after | Date | Site | Discoverer(s) | Category | Diam. | Ref |
|---|---|---|---|---|---|---|---|---|
| 568901 | 2004 VY_{136} | — | October 28, 1995 | Kitt Peak | Spacewatch | · | 1.1 km | MPC · JPL |
| 568902 | 2004 WX_{13} | — | September 6, 2008 | Catalina | CSS | LEO | 1.6 km | MPC · JPL |
| 568903 | 2004 XL_{2} | — | December 1, 2004 | Palomar | NEAT | · | 1.0 km | MPC · JPL |
| 568904 | 2004 XU_{14} | — | November 30, 2004 | Palomar | NEAT | (895) | 4.8 km | MPC · JPL |
| 568905 | 2004 XS_{16} | — | September 27, 1992 | Kitt Peak | Spacewatch | · | 2.7 km | MPC · JPL |
| 568906 | 2004 XM_{26} | — | December 9, 2004 | Kitt Peak | Spacewatch | · | 1.1 km | MPC · JPL |
| 568907 | 2004 XT_{46} | — | December 9, 2004 | Kitt Peak | Spacewatch | · | 1.3 km | MPC · JPL |
| 568908 | 2004 XQ_{54} | — | December 10, 2004 | Kitt Peak | Spacewatch | · | 1.4 km | MPC · JPL |
| 568909 | 2004 XU_{70} | — | November 26, 2003 | Kitt Peak | Spacewatch | L5 | 10 km | MPC · JPL |
| 568910 | 2004 XG_{83} | — | December 11, 2004 | Kitt Peak | Spacewatch | NEM | 2.1 km | MPC · JPL |
| 568911 | 2004 XC_{114} | — | December 10, 2004 | Kitt Peak | Spacewatch | MRX | 960 m | MPC · JPL |
| 568912 | 2004 XQ_{116} | — | December 12, 2004 | Kitt Peak | Spacewatch | · | 720 m | MPC · JPL |
| 568913 | 2004 XX_{116} | — | December 2, 2004 | Kitt Peak | Spacewatch | · | 650 m | MPC · JPL |
| 568914 | 2004 XD_{140} | — | December 13, 2004 | Kitt Peak | Spacewatch | · | 2.9 km | MPC · JPL |
| 568915 | 2004 XW_{153} | — | October 21, 1995 | Kitt Peak | Spacewatch | · | 1.8 km | MPC · JPL |
| 568916 | 2004 XB_{157} | — | December 14, 2004 | Kitt Peak | Spacewatch | · | 1.8 km | MPC · JPL |
| 568917 | 2004 XD_{163} | — | December 15, 2004 | Kitt Peak | Spacewatch | · | 1.0 km | MPC · JPL |
| 568918 | 2004 XH_{165} | — | December 2, 2004 | Palomar | NEAT | JUN | 790 m | MPC · JPL |
| 568919 | 2004 XV_{167} | — | December 3, 2004 | Kitt Peak | Spacewatch | · | 640 m | MPC · JPL |
| 568920 | 2004 XC_{193} | — | October 26, 1995 | Kitt Peak | Spacewatch | · | 2.2 km | MPC · JPL |
| 568921 | 2004 XS_{193} | — | September 22, 2008 | Mount Lemmon | Mount Lemmon Survey | · | 1.5 km | MPC · JPL |
| 568922 | 2004 XT_{193} | — | September 23, 2008 | Kitt Peak | Spacewatch | · | 1.7 km | MPC · JPL |
| 568923 | 2004 XB_{194} | — | November 28, 2013 | Mount Lemmon | Mount Lemmon Survey | · | 1.5 km | MPC · JPL |
| 568924 | 2004 XN_{194} | — | January 24, 2014 | Haleakala | Pan-STARRS 1 | · | 1.3 km | MPC · JPL |
| 568925 | 2004 XS_{194} | — | October 10, 2008 | Mount Lemmon | Mount Lemmon Survey | · | 1.5 km | MPC · JPL |
| 568926 | 2004 XX_{194} | — | September 9, 2008 | Mount Lemmon | Mount Lemmon Survey | · | 1.4 km | MPC · JPL |
| 568927 | 2004 XJ_{196} | — | October 8, 2008 | Kitt Peak | Spacewatch | · | 1.8 km | MPC · JPL |
| 568928 | 2004 XT_{196} | — | September 15, 2013 | Mount Lemmon | Mount Lemmon Survey | 615 | 1.2 km | MPC · JPL |
| 568929 | 2004 XH_{197} | — | October 7, 2008 | Mount Lemmon | Mount Lemmon Survey | · | 1.7 km | MPC · JPL |
| 568930 | 2004 XT_{197} | — | October 21, 2008 | Mount Lemmon | Mount Lemmon Survey | · | 1.8 km | MPC · JPL |
| 568931 | 2004 XS_{198} | — | December 31, 2008 | Mount Lemmon | Mount Lemmon Survey | · | 1.2 km | MPC · JPL |
| 568932 | 2004 YW_{7} | — | December 19, 2004 | Mount Lemmon | Mount Lemmon Survey | · | 1.5 km | MPC · JPL |
| 568933 | 2004 YD_{9} | — | December 14, 2004 | Catalina | CSS | · | 890 m | MPC · JPL |
| 568934 | 2004 YC_{13} | — | December 19, 2004 | Mount Lemmon | Mount Lemmon Survey | PHO | 660 m | MPC · JPL |
| 568935 | 2004 YM_{17} | — | December 19, 2004 | Mount Lemmon | Mount Lemmon Survey | · | 1.6 km | MPC · JPL |
| 568936 | 2004 YA_{22} | — | December 19, 2004 | Mount Lemmon | Mount Lemmon Survey | · | 2.2 km | MPC · JPL |
| 568937 | 2004 YG_{24} | — | December 16, 2004 | Kitt Peak | Spacewatch | · | 1.6 km | MPC · JPL |
| 568938 | 2004 YF_{38} | — | September 23, 2008 | Mount Lemmon | Mount Lemmon Survey | · | 1.5 km | MPC · JPL |
| 568939 | 2004 YL_{38} | — | November 9, 2009 | Mount Lemmon | Mount Lemmon Survey | · | 2.6 km | MPC · JPL |
| 568940 | 2004 YX_{39} | — | January 18, 2016 | Haleakala | Pan-STARRS 1 | · | 650 m | MPC · JPL |
| 568941 | 2004 YO_{40} | — | September 21, 2017 | Haleakala | Pan-STARRS 1 | · | 1.6 km | MPC · JPL |
| 568942 | 2004 YX_{41} | — | December 18, 2004 | Kitt Peak | Spacewatch | · | 1.2 km | MPC · JPL |
| 568943 | 2005 AN_{52} | — | January 13, 2005 | Kitt Peak | Spacewatch | · | 900 m | MPC · JPL |
| 568944 | 2005 AW_{62} | — | January 13, 1996 | Kitt Peak | Spacewatch | · | 1.6 km | MPC · JPL |
| 568945 | 2005 AK_{83} | — | September 25, 2012 | Mount Lemmon | Mount Lemmon Survey | · | 2.1 km | MPC · JPL |
| 568946 | 2005 AP_{84} | — | November 28, 2013 | Haleakala | Pan-STARRS 1 | · | 1.9 km | MPC · JPL |
| 568947 | 2005 BJ_{29} | — | January 19, 2005 | Kitt Peak | Spacewatch | MAS | 610 m | MPC · JPL |
| 568948 | 2005 BW_{29} | — | January 19, 2005 | Kitt Peak | Spacewatch | AGN | 1.0 km | MPC · JPL |
| 568949 | 2005 BA_{31} | — | January 16, 2005 | Mauna Kea | Veillet, C. | L5 | 6.2 km | MPC · JPL |
| 568950 | 2005 BE_{32} | — | January 13, 2005 | Kitt Peak | Spacewatch | · | 1.7 km | MPC · JPL |
| 568951 | 2005 BE_{37} | — | March 9, 2002 | Kitt Peak | Spacewatch | · | 1.2 km | MPC · JPL |
| 568952 | 2005 BF_{37} | — | January 16, 2005 | Mauna Kea | Veillet, C. | · | 1.5 km | MPC · JPL |
| 568953 | 2005 BE_{38} | — | January 15, 2005 | Kitt Peak | Spacewatch | · | 2.0 km | MPC · JPL |
| 568954 | 2005 BM_{38} | — | January 16, 2005 | Mauna Kea | Veillet, C. | KOR | 1.0 km | MPC · JPL |
| 568955 | 2005 BU_{39} | — | January 16, 2005 | Mauna Kea | Veillet, C. | · | 630 m | MPC · JPL |
| 568956 | 2005 BM_{41} | — | January 16, 2005 | Mauna Kea | Veillet, C. | KOR | 1.1 km | MPC · JPL |
| 568957 | 2005 BB_{43} | — | January 16, 2005 | Mauna Kea | Veillet, C. | · | 1.6 km | MPC · JPL |
| 568958 | 2005 BB_{46} | — | January 16, 2005 | Mauna Kea | Veillet, C. | · | 870 m | MPC · JPL |
| 568959 Michaellesko | 2005 BJ_{47} | Michaellesko | January 16, 2005 | Mauna Kea | P. A. Wiegert, D. D. Balam | · | 1.4 km | MPC · JPL |
| 568960 | 2005 BK_{50} | — | October 6, 2008 | Mount Lemmon | Mount Lemmon Survey | WIT | 1.0 km | MPC · JPL |
| 568961 | 2005 BM_{50} | — | April 7, 2008 | Kitt Peak | Spacewatch | L5 | 8.2 km | MPC · JPL |
| 568962 | 2005 BZ_{50} | — | October 25, 2008 | Kitt Peak | Spacewatch | · | 1.8 km | MPC · JPL |
| 568963 | 2005 BB_{51} | — | January 17, 2005 | Kitt Peak | Spacewatch | · | 1.4 km | MPC · JPL |
| 568964 | 2005 BF_{51} | — | June 7, 2016 | Haleakala | Pan-STARRS 1 | · | 1.9 km | MPC · JPL |
| 568965 | 2005 BE_{52} | — | January 16, 2005 | Kitt Peak | Spacewatch | · | 970 m | MPC · JPL |
| 568966 | 2005 BJ_{52} | — | February 13, 2005 | La Silla | A. Boattini | · | 1.9 km | MPC · JPL |
| 568967 | 2005 BT_{52} | — | January 19, 2005 | Kitt Peak | Spacewatch | · | 1.9 km | MPC · JPL |
| 568968 | 2005 BL_{53} | — | July 18, 2007 | Mount Lemmon | Mount Lemmon Survey | · | 2.4 km | MPC · JPL |
| 568969 | 2005 BP_{53} | — | January 13, 2018 | Mount Lemmon | Mount Lemmon Survey | · | 1.4 km | MPC · JPL |
| 568970 | 2005 BT_{53} | — | March 16, 2012 | Mount Lemmon | Mount Lemmon Survey | · | 530 m | MPC · JPL |
| 568971 | 2005 BH_{54} | — | October 8, 2008 | Mount Lemmon | Mount Lemmon Survey | · | 1.6 km | MPC · JPL |
| 568972 | 2005 BW_{54} | — | May 3, 2009 | Mount Lemmon | Mount Lemmon Survey | L5 | 8.8 km | MPC · JPL |
| 568973 | 2005 BC_{55} | — | November 24, 2016 | Haleakala | Pan-STARRS 1 | KON | 2.0 km | MPC · JPL |
| 568974 | 2005 BJ_{56} | — | April 18, 2020 | Haleakala | Pan-STARRS 1 | L5 | 6.5 km | MPC · JPL |
| 568975 | 2005 CN_{3} | — | February 1, 2005 | Kitt Peak | Spacewatch | · | 1.5 km | MPC · JPL |
| 568976 | 2005 CR_{27} | — | February 2, 2005 | Catalina | CSS | · | 1.1 km | MPC · JPL |
| 568977 | 2005 CF_{56} | — | February 4, 2005 | Mount Lemmon | Mount Lemmon Survey | · | 470 m | MPC · JPL |
| 568978 | 2005 CB_{77} | — | October 25, 2012 | Mount Lemmon | Mount Lemmon Survey | · | 1.4 km | MPC · JPL |
| 568979 | 2005 CZ_{81} | — | February 4, 2005 | Kitt Peak | Spacewatch | · | 1.2 km | MPC · JPL |
| 568980 | 2005 CF_{82} | — | February 2, 2005 | Kitt Peak | Spacewatch | BRA | 1.6 km | MPC · JPL |
| 568981 | 2005 CJ_{82} | — | November 19, 2008 | Kitt Peak | Spacewatch | · | 1.8 km | MPC · JPL |
| 568982 | 2005 CL_{82} | — | December 16, 2011 | XuYi | PMO NEO Survey Program | · | 980 m | MPC · JPL |
| 568983 | 2005 CP_{82} | — | June 7, 2013 | Mount Lemmon | Mount Lemmon Survey | · | 1.5 km | MPC · JPL |
| 568984 | 2005 CR_{83} | — | February 20, 2009 | Kitt Peak | Spacewatch | NYS | 1.1 km | MPC · JPL |
| 568985 | 2005 CV_{83} | — | February 2, 2005 | Kitt Peak | Spacewatch | · | 1.3 km | MPC · JPL |
| 568986 | 2005 CJ_{84} | — | March 24, 2009 | Mount Lemmon | Mount Lemmon Survey | NYS | 950 m | MPC · JPL |
| 568987 | 2005 CF_{85} | — | November 20, 2007 | Mount Lemmon | Mount Lemmon Survey | V | 510 m | MPC · JPL |
| 568988 | 2005 CV_{85} | — | August 1, 2017 | Haleakala | Pan-STARRS 1 | GAL | 1.7 km | MPC · JPL |
| 568989 | 2005 CT_{86} | — | February 4, 2006 | Kitt Peak | Spacewatch | L5 | 7.6 km | MPC · JPL |
| 568990 | 2005 DV_{3} | — | February 18, 2005 | La Silla | A. Boattini | · | 820 m | MPC · JPL |
| 568991 | 2005 ET_{16} | — | March 3, 2005 | Kitt Peak | Spacewatch | GEF | 980 m | MPC · JPL |
| 568992 | 2005 EO_{23} | — | March 3, 2005 | Catalina | CSS | · | 1.3 km | MPC · JPL |
| 568993 | 2005 EM_{56} | — | January 16, 2005 | Kitt Peak | Spacewatch | · | 900 m | MPC · JPL |
| 568994 | 2005 EL_{59} | — | November 20, 2003 | Palomar | NEAT | · | 4.5 km | MPC · JPL |
| 568995 | 2005 EW_{115} | — | March 4, 2005 | Mount Lemmon | Mount Lemmon Survey | · | 1.1 km | MPC · JPL |
| 568996 | 2005 EU_{117} | — | March 5, 2005 | La Silla | Gauderon, R., Behrend, R. | · | 1.7 km | MPC · JPL |
| 568997 | 2005 EW_{134} | — | February 16, 2005 | La Silla | A. Boattini | · | 1.8 km | MPC · JPL |
| 568998 | 2005 ES_{143} | — | March 10, 2005 | Mount Lemmon | Mount Lemmon Survey | · | 1.6 km | MPC · JPL |
| 568999 | 2005 EJ_{160} | — | March 9, 2005 | Mount Lemmon | Mount Lemmon Survey | · | 1.0 km | MPC · JPL |
| 569000 | 2005 ET_{187} | — | March 10, 2005 | Mount Lemmon | Mount Lemmon Survey | · | 680 m | MPC · JPL |

back to top

== Meaning of names ==
As minor planet discoveries are confirmed, they are given a permanent number by the IAU's Minor Planet Center (MPC), and the discoverers can then submit names for them, following the IAU's naming conventions. The list below concerns those minor planets in the specified number-range that have received names, and explains the meanings of those names.

Official naming citations of newly named small Solar System bodies are approved and published in a bulletin by IAU's Working Group for Small Bodies Nomenclature (WGSBN). Before May 2021, citations were published in MPC's Minor Planet Circulars for many decades. Recent citations can also be found on the JPL Small-Body Database (SBDB). Until his death in 2016, German astronomer Lutz D. Schmadel compiled these citations into the Dictionary of Minor Planet Names (DMP) and regularly updated the collection.

Based on Paul Herget's The Names of the Minor Planets, Schmadel also researched the unclear origin of numerous asteroids, most of which had been named prior to World War II. This article incorporates text from this source, which is in the public domain: SBDB New namings may only be added to this list below after official publication as the preannouncement of names is condemned. The WGSBN publishes a comprehensive guideline for the naming rules of non-cometary small Solar System bodies.

| Named minor planet | Provisional | This minor planet was named for... | Ref · Catalog |
|---|---|---|---|
| 568092 Alexschmid | 2003 QF_{117} | Alexander Schmid, Canadian instructor with the Department of Physics and Astronomy of the University of Victoria and a thirty-year member of the Victoria chapter of the Royal Astronomical Society of Canada. | IAU · 568092 |
| 568959 Michaellesko | 2005 BJ_{47} | Michael Lesko, Canadian student of astrophysics at the University of Waterloo as well as an intern at the Canadian Space Agency. | IAU · 568959 |
