= List of minor planets: 642001–643000 =

The following is a partial list of minor planets, running from minor-planet number 642001 through 643000, inclusive. The primary data for this and other partial lists is based on JPL's "Small-Body Orbital Elements" and data available from the Minor Planet Center. Critical list information is also provided by the MPC, unless otherwise specified from Lowell Observatory. A detailed description of the table's columns and additional sources are given on the main page including a complete list of every page in this series, and a statistical break-up on the dynamical classification of minor planets.

Also see the summary list of all named bodies in numerical and alphabetical order, and the corresponding naming citations for the number range of this particular list. New namings may only be added to this list after official publication, as the preannouncement of names is condemned by the Working Group for Small Bodies Nomenclature of the International Astronomical Union.

Near-Earth obj.	MBA (inner)	MBA (outer)	Centaur
Mars-crosser	MBA (middle)	Jupiter trojan	Trans-Neptunian obj.
Unclassified

== 642001–642100 ==
Designation			Discovery			Properties		Ref
Permanent	Provisional	Named after	Date	Site	Discoverer(s)	Category	Diam.	Ref
642001	2004 WZ_{13}	—	November 25, 2009	Kitt Peak	Spacewatch	·	1.6 km	MPC · JPL
642002	2004 XV_{33}	—	November 11, 2004	Kitt Peak	Spacewatch	·	880 m	MPC · JPL
642003	2004 XL_{37}	—	December 11, 2004	Campo Imperatore	CINEOS	·	3.0 km	MPC · JPL
642004	2004 XH_{39}	—	December 7, 2004	Socorro	LINEAR	·	1.3 km	MPC · JPL
642005	2004 XF_{50}	—	December 10, 2004	Calvin-Rehoboth	L. A. Molnar	·	1.2 km	MPC · JPL
642006	2004 XS_{60}	—	December 13, 2004	Kitt Peak	Spacewatch	·	850 m	MPC · JPL
642007	2004 XE_{70}	—	December 11, 2004	Kitt Peak	Spacewatch	·	2.0 km	MPC · JPL
642008	2004 XG_{91}	—	December 11, 2004	Kitt Peak	Spacewatch	NYS	880 m	MPC · JPL
642009	2004 XX_{94}	—	December 11, 2004	Kitt Peak	Spacewatch	NYS	880 m	MPC · JPL
642010	2004 XP_{98}	—	December 11, 2004	Kitt Peak	Spacewatch	·	930 m	MPC · JPL
642011	2004 XK_{105}	—	December 11, 2004	Socorro	LINEAR	·	4.3 km	MPC · JPL
642012	2004 XU_{121}	—	December 15, 2004	Kitt Peak	Spacewatch	V	540 m	MPC · JPL
642013	2004 XY_{131}	—	December 11, 2004	Socorro	LINEAR	·	1.3 km	MPC · JPL
642014	2004 XL_{139}	—	December 13, 2004	Kitt Peak	Spacewatch	·	1.1 km	MPC · JPL
642015	2004 XB_{141}	—	December 14, 2004	Kitt Peak	Spacewatch	·	1.7 km	MPC · JPL
642016	2004 XX_{142}	—	December 9, 2004	Kitt Peak	Spacewatch	·	1.8 km	MPC · JPL
642017	2004 XG_{153}	—	December 15, 2004	Kitt Peak	Spacewatch	·	1.9 km	MPC · JPL
642018	2004 XM_{153}	—	December 15, 2004	Kitt Peak	Spacewatch	·	1.1 km	MPC · JPL
642019	2004 XD_{156}	—	December 14, 2004	Kitt Peak	Spacewatch	V	760 m	MPC · JPL
642020	2004 XY_{170}	—	December 9, 2004	Kitt Peak	Spacewatch	MAR	1.2 km	MPC · JPL
642021	2004 XQ_{185}	—	December 12, 2004	Socorro	LINEAR	EUP	3.8 km	MPC · JPL
642022	2004 XK_{193}	—	October 21, 2012	Mount Lemmon	Mount Lemmon Survey	·	1.2 km	MPC · JPL
642023	2004 XQ_{193}	—	September 9, 2008	Mount Lemmon	Mount Lemmon Survey	·	1.6 km	MPC · JPL
642024	2004 XF_{194}	—	September 25, 2011	Haleakala	Pan-STARRS 1	·	1.1 km	MPC · JPL
642025	2004 XV_{194}	—	October 6, 2008	Mount Lemmon	Mount Lemmon Survey	·	1.7 km	MPC · JPL
642026	2004 XZ_{194}	—	January 25, 2015	Haleakala	Pan-STARRS 1	·	2.0 km	MPC · JPL
642027	2004 XE_{197}	—	September 9, 2013	Haleakala	Pan-STARRS 1	·	1.6 km	MPC · JPL
642028	2004 XC_{198}	—	December 22, 2008	Kitt Peak	Spacewatch	·	1.1 km	MPC · JPL
642029	2004 XH_{198}	—	November 19, 2014	Mount Lemmon	Mount Lemmon Survey	·	2.3 km	MPC · JPL
642030	2004 XP_{198}	—	October 24, 2014	Mount Lemmon	Mount Lemmon Survey	·	2.1 km	MPC · JPL
642031	2004 XX_{198}	—	January 16, 2018	Haleakala	Pan-STARRS 1	·	3.4 km	MPC · JPL
642032	2004 YW_{35}	—	December 21, 2008	Kitt Peak	Spacewatch	MAS	700 m	MPC · JPL
642033	2004 YA_{38}	—	December 21, 2004	Catalina	CSS	·	1.5 km	MPC · JPL
642034	2004 YC_{39}	—	August 23, 2008	Siding Spring	SSS	(18466)	2.4 km	MPC · JPL
642035	2004 YO_{39}	—	January 29, 2009	Kitt Peak	Spacewatch	·	830 m	MPC · JPL
642036	2004 YE_{40}	—	December 20, 2004	Mount Lemmon	Mount Lemmon Survey	·	1.7 km	MPC · JPL
642037	2004 YT_{40}	—	October 2, 2013	Kitt Peak	Spacewatch	MRX	800 m	MPC · JPL
642038	2004 YZ_{40}	—	January 18, 2013	Kitt Peak	Spacewatch	·	890 m	MPC · JPL
642039	2004 YC_{41}	—	September 23, 2015	Haleakala	Pan-STARRS 1	·	1.1 km	MPC · JPL
642040	2005 AS_{66}	—	January 13, 2005	Kitt Peak	Spacewatch	·	2.1 km	MPC · JPL
642041	2005 AC_{76}	—	January 15, 2005	Kitt Peak	Spacewatch	·	430 m	MPC · JPL
642042	2005 AF_{84}	—	October 27, 2008	Mount Lemmon	Mount Lemmon Survey	·	1.7 km	MPC · JPL
642043	2005 AB_{85}	—	September 23, 2015	Haleakala	Pan-STARRS 1	·	1.2 km	MPC · JPL
642044	2005 BP_{20}	—	January 16, 2005	Kitt Peak	Spacewatch	·	1.8 km	MPC · JPL
642045	2005 BA_{36}	—	January 16, 2005	Mauna Kea	Veillet, C.	·	770 m	MPC · JPL
642046	2005 BE_{45}	—	January 16, 2005	Mauna Kea	Veillet, C.	KOR	1.0 km	MPC · JPL
642047	2005 BJ_{51}	—	January 17, 2005	Kitt Peak	Spacewatch	·	1.3 km	MPC · JPL
642048	2005 BS_{51}	—	December 31, 2013	Haleakala	Pan-STARRS 1	·	1.4 km	MPC · JPL
642049	2005 BB_{54}	—	December 12, 2012	Kitt Peak	Spacewatch	H	410 m	MPC · JPL
642050	2005 BJ_{54}	—	January 29, 2009	Kitt Peak	Spacewatch	·	960 m	MPC · JPL
642051	2005 BS_{55}	—	December 14, 2015	Haleakala	Pan-STARRS 1	V	470 m	MPC · JPL
642052	2005 CY_{10}	—	February 1, 2005	Kitt Peak	Spacewatch	AGN	1.0 km	MPC · JPL
642053	2005 CP_{15}	—	January 17, 2005	Kitt Peak	Spacewatch	·	1.3 km	MPC · JPL
642054	2005 CN_{33}	—	February 2, 2005	Kitt Peak	Spacewatch	·	680 m	MPC · JPL
642055	2005 CX_{40}	—	February 9, 2005	La Silla	A. Boattini	·	1.0 km	MPC · JPL
642056	2005 CA_{66}	—	February 9, 2005	Kitt Peak	Spacewatch	·	1.6 km	MPC · JPL
642057	2005 CO_{85}	—	August 18, 2017	Haleakala	Pan-STARRS 1	DOR	2.3 km	MPC · JPL
642058	2005 CS_{85}	—	July 6, 2017	Haleakala	Pan-STARRS 1	H	410 m	MPC · JPL
642059	2005 CU_{85}	—	November 24, 2011	Mount Lemmon	Mount Lemmon Survey	·	1.0 km	MPC · JPL
642060	2005 CK_{86}	—	October 20, 2007	Mount Lemmon	Mount Lemmon Survey	·	1.1 km	MPC · JPL
642061	2005 CP_{88}	—	February 4, 2005	Kitt Peak	Spacewatch	·	800 m	MPC · JPL
642062	2005 DO_{4}	—	December 8, 2015	Haleakala	Pan-STARRS 1	·	1.1 km	MPC · JPL
642063	2005 DQ_{4}	—	February 16, 2005	La Silla	A. Boattini	·	1.5 km	MPC · JPL
642064	2005 EM_{15}	—	March 3, 2005	Kitt Peak	Spacewatch	·	2.3 km	MPC · JPL
642065	2005 EZ_{39}	—	March 1, 2005	Kitt Peak	Spacewatch	·	510 m	MPC · JPL
642066	2005 EC_{59}	—	February 14, 2005	Kitt Peak	Spacewatch	·	1.4 km	MPC · JPL
642067	2005 EA_{67}	—	March 4, 2005	Mount Lemmon	Mount Lemmon Survey	VER	2.1 km	MPC · JPL
642068	2005 EX_{105}	—	March 4, 2005	Mount Lemmon	Mount Lemmon Survey	·	720 m	MPC · JPL
642069	2005 EP_{106}	—	March 4, 2005	Mount Lemmon	Mount Lemmon Survey	NYS	1.0 km	MPC · JPL
642070	2005 EO_{110}	—	March 4, 2005	Mount Lemmon	Mount Lemmon Survey	·	1.1 km	MPC · JPL
642071	2005 EZ_{144}	—	March 10, 2005	Mount Lemmon	Mount Lemmon Survey	·	700 m	MPC · JPL
642072	2005 EN_{147}	—	March 10, 2005	Mount Lemmon	Mount Lemmon Survey	·	580 m	MPC · JPL
642073	2005 EO_{166}	—	March 11, 2005	Mount Lemmon	Mount Lemmon Survey	·	640 m	MPC · JPL
642074	2005 EH_{213}	—	March 4, 2005	Mount Lemmon	Mount Lemmon Survey	·	630 m	MPC · JPL
642075	2005 EV_{215}	—	March 8, 2005	Vail-Jarnac	Jarnac	·	1.3 km	MPC · JPL
642076	2005 EJ_{232}	—	March 10, 2005	Mount Lemmon	Mount Lemmon Survey	·	870 m	MPC · JPL
642077	2005 EJ_{235}	—	March 10, 2005	Mount Lemmon	Mount Lemmon Survey	·	1.3 km	MPC · JPL
642078	2005 EG_{237}	—	March 11, 2005	Kitt Peak	Spacewatch	·	600 m	MPC · JPL
642079	2005 ED_{304}	—	March 11, 2005	Kitt Peak	Deep Ecliptic Survey	·	1.4 km	MPC · JPL
642080	2005 EE_{309}	—	March 9, 2005	Mount Lemmon	Mount Lemmon Survey	·	1.6 km	MPC · JPL
642081	2005 EK_{310}	—	March 10, 2005	Mount Lemmon	Mount Lemmon Survey	·	1.6 km	MPC · JPL
642082	2005 EU_{311}	—	March 10, 2005	Mount Lemmon	Mount Lemmon Survey	·	910 m	MPC · JPL
642083	2005 EF_{312}	—	November 20, 2003	Kitt Peak	Spacewatch	·	1.6 km	MPC · JPL
642084	2005 EY_{325}	—	March 10, 2005	Mount Lemmon	Mount Lemmon Survey	·	1.4 km	MPC · JPL
642085	2005 EL_{334}	—	March 9, 2005	Mount Lemmon	Mount Lemmon Survey	·	570 m	MPC · JPL
642086	2005 ER_{337}	—	January 8, 2011	Mount Lemmon	Mount Lemmon Survey	·	610 m	MPC · JPL
642087	2005 EX_{341}	—	November 24, 2011	Haleakala	Pan-STARRS 1	·	1.5 km	MPC · JPL
642088	2005 EU_{342}	—	November 28, 2013	Mount Lemmon	Mount Lemmon Survey	·	1.4 km	MPC · JPL
642089	2005 EZ_{342}	—	November 28, 2013	Mount Lemmon	Mount Lemmon Survey	·	580 m	MPC · JPL
642090	2005 EF_{343}	—	July 26, 2017	Haleakala	Pan-STARRS 1	·	1.3 km	MPC · JPL
642091	2005 ES_{343}	—	July 30, 2017	Haleakala	Pan-STARRS 1	KOR	1.1 km	MPC · JPL
642092	2005 ET_{345}	—	March 11, 2005	Mount Lemmon	Mount Lemmon Survey	·	1.8 km	MPC · JPL
642093	2005 EO_{346}	—	June 7, 2016	Haleakala	Pan-STARRS 1	·	440 m	MPC · JPL
642094	2005 EH_{347}	—	September 14, 2007	Kitt Peak	Spacewatch	·	1.5 km	MPC · JPL
642095	2005 EL_{349}	—	March 8, 2005	Mount Lemmon	Mount Lemmon Survey	·	1.0 km	MPC · JPL
642096	2005 FT_{17}	—	March 17, 2005	Mount Lemmon	Mount Lemmon Survey	·	890 m	MPC · JPL
642097 Kusturica	2005 GA_{16}	Kusturica	April 2, 2005	Nogales	J.-C. Merlin	·	1.2 km	MPC · JPL
642098	2005 GF_{24}	—	March 12, 2005	Kitt Peak	Deep Ecliptic Survey	·	820 m	MPC · JPL
642099	2005 GX_{25}	—	April 2, 2005	Mount Lemmon	Mount Lemmon Survey	EOS	1.6 km	MPC · JPL
642100	2005 GO_{49}	—	April 5, 2005	Palomar	NEAT	·	2.1 km	MPC · JPL

== 642101–642200 ==
back to top

Designation			Discovery			Properties		Ref
Permanent	Provisional	Named after	Date	Site	Discoverer(s)	Category	Diam.	Ref
642101	2005 GP_{96}	—	April 6, 2005	Mount Lemmon	Mount Lemmon Survey	·	930 m	MPC · JPL
642102	2005 GX_{111}	—	April 6, 2005	Campo Imperatore	CINEOS	·	2.9 km	MPC · JPL
642103	2005 GB_{116}	—	March 8, 2005	Mount Lemmon	Mount Lemmon Survey	·	1.2 km	MPC · JPL
642104	2005 GS_{120}	—	September 14, 2007	Mount Lemmon	Mount Lemmon Survey	·	950 m	MPC · JPL
642105	2005 GQ_{126}	—	April 11, 2005	Mount Lemmon	Mount Lemmon Survey	·	1.1 km	MPC · JPL
642106	2005 GM_{132}	—	April 10, 2005	Kitt Peak	Spacewatch	·	1.0 km	MPC · JPL
642107	2005 GV_{137}	—	April 11, 2005	Mount Lemmon	Mount Lemmon Survey	·	2.0 km	MPC · JPL
642108	2005 GU_{142}	—	April 10, 2005	Kitt Peak	Spacewatch	·	530 m	MPC · JPL
642109	2005 GQ_{147}	—	March 11, 2005	Mount Lemmon	Mount Lemmon Survey	·	670 m	MPC · JPL
642110	2005 GC_{154}	—	April 14, 2005	Kitt Peak	Spacewatch	·	580 m	MPC · JPL
642111	2005 GT_{158}	—	April 12, 2005	Kitt Peak	Spacewatch	·	610 m	MPC · JPL
642112	2005 GR_{165}	—	April 11, 2005	Kitt Peak	Spacewatch	H	370 m	MPC · JPL
642113	2005 GQ_{174}	—	April 14, 2005	Kitt Peak	Spacewatch	·	1.4 km	MPC · JPL
642114	2005 GU_{194}	—	March 4, 2005	Mount Lemmon	Mount Lemmon Survey	·	1.5 km	MPC · JPL
642115	2005 GK_{198}	—	April 10, 2005	Kitt Peak	Deep Ecliptic Survey	KOR	1.1 km	MPC · JPL
642116	2005 GO_{199}	—	April 10, 2005	Kitt Peak	Deep Ecliptic Survey	·	780 m	MPC · JPL
642117	2005 GP_{202}	—	March 9, 2005	Mount Lemmon	Mount Lemmon Survey	EOS	1.3 km	MPC · JPL
642118	2005 GJ_{217}	—	April 2, 2005	Kitt Peak	Spacewatch	PHO	790 m	MPC · JPL
642119	2005 GE_{223}	—	April 6, 2005	Mount Lemmon	Mount Lemmon Survey	·	480 m	MPC · JPL
642120	2005 GF_{225}	—	March 12, 2005	Kitt Peak	Deep Ecliptic Survey	·	1.7 km	MPC · JPL
642121	2005 GO_{231}	—	April 18, 2015	Cerro Tololo	DECam	·	1.4 km	MPC · JPL
642122	2005 GR_{232}	—	April 11, 2005	Mount Lemmon	Mount Lemmon Survey	·	2.2 km	MPC · JPL
642123	2005 GQ_{233}	—	September 9, 2015	Haleakala	Pan-STARRS 1	·	1.0 km	MPC · JPL
642124	2005 GD_{234}	—	April 14, 2005	Kitt Peak	Spacewatch	·	660 m	MPC · JPL
642125	2005 GG_{234}	—	April 9, 2005	Mount Lemmon	Mount Lemmon Survey	·	1.6 km	MPC · JPL
642126	2005 GV_{234}	—	November 3, 2016	Haleakala	Pan-STARRS 1	·	670 m	MPC · JPL
642127	2005 GK_{235}	—	October 13, 2016	Mount Lemmon	Mount Lemmon Survey	·	660 m	MPC · JPL
642128	2005 GN_{236}	—	September 28, 2006	Kitt Peak	Spacewatch	·	620 m	MPC · JPL
642129	2005 GK_{238}	—	November 1, 2018	Mount Lemmon	Mount Lemmon Survey	EOS	1.5 km	MPC · JPL
642130	2005 GY_{239}	—	April 2, 2005	Mount Lemmon	Mount Lemmon Survey	EUN	840 m	MPC · JPL
642131	2005 GK_{240}	—	April 12, 2005	Mount Lemmon	Mount Lemmon Survey	NYS	1.1 km	MPC · JPL
642132	2005 GP_{241}	—	April 2, 2005	Mount Lemmon	Mount Lemmon Survey	·	1.4 km	MPC · JPL
642133	2005 HF_{11}	—	January 1, 2012	Mount Lemmon	Mount Lemmon Survey	·	1.4 km	MPC · JPL
642134	2005 HL_{12}	—	April 17, 2005	Kitt Peak	Spacewatch	·	1.3 km	MPC · JPL
642135	2005 JG_{6}	—	May 4, 2005	Mauna Kea	Veillet, C.	·	1.8 km	MPC · JPL
642136	2005 JY_{14}	—	May 2, 2005	Kitt Peak	Spacewatch	·	1.6 km	MPC · JPL
642137	2005 JU_{19}	—	May 4, 2005	Anderson Mesa	LONEOS	·	1.6 km	MPC · JPL
642138	2005 JO_{26}	—	May 3, 2005	Kitt Peak	Spacewatch	·	1.1 km	MPC · JPL
642139	2005 JP_{40}	—	May 7, 2005	Mount Lemmon	Mount Lemmon Survey	·	1.0 km	MPC · JPL
642140	2005 JJ_{49}	—	May 4, 2005	Kitt Peak	Spacewatch	·	3.2 km	MPC · JPL
642141	2005 JZ_{52}	—	May 4, 2005	Mount Lemmon	Mount Lemmon Survey	EUN	1.1 km	MPC · JPL
642142	2005 JF_{53}	—	September 19, 2007	Kitt Peak	Spacewatch	·	2.0 km	MPC · JPL
642143	2005 JH_{53}	—	May 4, 2005	Mount Lemmon	Mount Lemmon Survey	·	1.2 km	MPC · JPL
642144	2005 JZ_{53}	—	May 4, 2005	Kitt Peak	Spacewatch	·	2.4 km	MPC · JPL
642145	2005 JE_{65}	—	May 4, 2005	Kitt Peak	Spacewatch	·	1.6 km	MPC · JPL
642146	2005 JT_{83}	—	May 8, 2005	Kitt Peak	Spacewatch	MAR	770 m	MPC · JPL
642147	2005 JN_{86}	—	April 16, 2005	Kitt Peak	Spacewatch	·	580 m	MPC · JPL
642148	2005 JT_{87}	—	May 9, 2005	Catalina	CSS	·	1.4 km	MPC · JPL
642149	2005 JO_{90}	—	May 3, 2005	Kitt Peak	Spacewatch	EUN	1 km	MPC · JPL
642150	2005 JU_{97}	—	May 8, 2005	Kitt Peak	Spacewatch	·	1.0 km	MPC · JPL
642151	2005 JT_{98}	—	May 8, 2005	Mount Lemmon	Mount Lemmon Survey	·	520 m	MPC · JPL
642152	2005 JB_{101}	—	May 9, 2005	Mount Lemmon	Mount Lemmon Survey	·	1.6 km	MPC · JPL
642153	2005 JC_{115}	—	March 28, 2001	Kitt Peak	Spacewatch	·	1.2 km	MPC · JPL
642154	2005 JO_{116}	—	May 10, 2005	Mount Lemmon	Mount Lemmon Survey	KOR	1.4 km	MPC · JPL
642155	2005 JV_{119}	—	May 10, 2005	Kitt Peak	Spacewatch	EOS	1.8 km	MPC · JPL
642156	2005 JL_{128}	—	May 13, 2005	Mount Lemmon	Mount Lemmon Survey	EUN	1.4 km	MPC · JPL
642157	2005 JV_{140}	—	April 11, 2005	Mount Lemmon	Mount Lemmon Survey	·	2.7 km	MPC · JPL
642158	2005 JS_{152}	—	April 16, 2005	Kitt Peak	Spacewatch	·	530 m	MPC · JPL
642159	2005 JS_{154}	—	May 4, 2005	Mount Lemmon	Mount Lemmon Survey	·	1.6 km	MPC · JPL
642160	2005 JZ_{156}	—	May 4, 2005	Kitt Peak	Spacewatch	·	650 m	MPC · JPL
642161	2005 JE_{158}	—	April 9, 2005	Mount Lemmon	Mount Lemmon Survey	·	460 m	MPC · JPL
642162	2005 JD_{167}	—	May 12, 2005	Palomar	NEAT	·	2.4 km	MPC · JPL
642163	2005 JN_{187}	—	January 27, 2011	Kitt Peak	Spacewatch	·	680 m	MPC · JPL
642164	2005 JB_{188}	—	October 26, 2013	Mount Lemmon	Mount Lemmon Survey	·	2.2 km	MPC · JPL
642165	2005 JK_{188}	—	March 19, 2009	Mount Lemmon	Mount Lemmon Survey	·	740 m	MPC · JPL
642166	2005 JV_{188}	—	April 11, 2013	Mount Lemmon	Mount Lemmon Survey	EUN	980 m	MPC · JPL
642167	2005 JE_{189}	—	May 8, 2005	Kitt Peak	Spacewatch	EUN	960 m	MPC · JPL
642168	2005 JF_{189}	—	May 14, 2005	Mount Lemmon	Mount Lemmon Survey	·	570 m	MPC · JPL
642169	2005 JN_{191}	—	October 16, 2015	Mount Lemmon	Mount Lemmon Survey	·	1.1 km	MPC · JPL
642170	2005 JP_{191}	—	May 9, 2005	Kitt Peak	Spacewatch	·	3.5 km	MPC · JPL
642171	2005 JQ_{191}	—	October 8, 2012	Kitt Peak	Spacewatch	·	1.7 km	MPC · JPL
642172	2005 JH_{192}	—	May 13, 2005	Kitt Peak	Spacewatch	·	1.5 km	MPC · JPL
642173	2005 JU_{192}	—	May 11, 2005	Mount Lemmon	Mount Lemmon Survey	EOS	1.8 km	MPC · JPL
642174	2005 JV_{192}	—	September 25, 2016	Mount Lemmon	Mount Lemmon Survey	·	530 m	MPC · JPL
642175	2005 JA_{193}	—	April 20, 2012	Kitt Peak	Spacewatch	(2076)	560 m	MPC · JPL
642176	2005 KE_{15}	—	May 16, 2005	Kitt Peak	Spacewatch	T_{j} (2.94)	5.5 km	MPC · JPL
642177	2005 KL_{15}	—	April 20, 2013	Kitt Peak	Spacewatch	·	1.4 km	MPC · JPL
642178	2005 KU_{15}	—	November 27, 2013	Haleakala	Pan-STARRS 1	·	600 m	MPC · JPL
642179	2005 KY_{15}	—	March 19, 2017	Mount Lemmon	Mount Lemmon Survey	MAR	930 m	MPC · JPL
642180	2005 LE	—	June 1, 2005	La Silla	Bourban, G., Vuissoz, C.	·	2.6 km	MPC · JPL
642181	2005 LO_{8}	—	June 5, 2005	Reedy Creek	J. Broughton	·	1.3 km	MPC · JPL
642182	2005 LG_{9}	—	June 1, 2005	Kitt Peak	Spacewatch	·	630 m	MPC · JPL
642183	2005 LC_{16}	—	May 13, 2005	Mount Lemmon	Mount Lemmon Survey	·	1.4 km	MPC · JPL
642184	2005 LQ_{21}	—	June 6, 2005	Kitt Peak	Spacewatch	·	660 m	MPC · JPL
642185	2005 LP_{36}	—	May 14, 2005	Mount Lemmon	Mount Lemmon Survey	·	680 m	MPC · JPL
642186	2005 LL_{53}	—	June 14, 2005	Mount Lemmon	Mount Lemmon Survey	VER	2.3 km	MPC · JPL
642187	2005 LN_{55}	—	September 19, 2009	Kitt Peak	Spacewatch	·	630 m	MPC · JPL
642188	2005 LZ_{56}	—	December 31, 2013	Haleakala	Pan-STARRS 1	·	560 m	MPC · JPL
642189	2005 LB_{57}	—	May 29, 2009	Kitt Peak	Spacewatch	·	1.0 km	MPC · JPL
642190	2005 LO_{57}	—	November 24, 2006	Mount Lemmon	Mount Lemmon Survey	·	1.1 km	MPC · JPL
642191	2005 LR_{57}	—	December 9, 2012	Haleakala	Pan-STARRS 1	EOS	1.5 km	MPC · JPL
642192	2005 LW_{57}	—	January 12, 2016	Haleakala	Pan-STARRS 1	·	1.5 km	MPC · JPL
642193	2005 LS_{58}	—	September 22, 2017	Haleakala	Pan-STARRS 1	·	2.4 km	MPC · JPL
642194	2005 LU_{58}	—	June 3, 2005	Kitt Peak	Spacewatch	·	640 m	MPC · JPL
642195	2005 LZ_{59}	—	June 3, 2005	Catalina	CSS	·	740 m	MPC · JPL
642196	2005 MQ	—	June 17, 2005	Mount Lemmon	Mount Lemmon Survey	PHO	830 m	MPC · JPL
642197	2005 MY_{5}	—	June 21, 2005	Palomar	NEAT	·	1.3 km	MPC · JPL
642198	2005 MR_{27}	—	June 29, 2005	Kitt Peak	Spacewatch	·	2.4 km	MPC · JPL
642199	2005 MZ_{27}	—	June 29, 2005	Kitt Peak	Spacewatch	·	2.9 km	MPC · JPL
642200	2005 MP_{33}	—	June 29, 2005	Kitt Peak	Spacewatch	·	1.1 km	MPC · JPL

== 642201–642300 ==
back to top

Designation			Discovery			Properties		Ref
Permanent	Provisional	Named after	Date	Site	Discoverer(s)	Category	Diam.	Ref
642201	2005 MS_{43}	—	June 6, 2005	Siding Spring	SSS	·	2.6 km	MPC · JPL
642202	2005 MO_{52}	—	June 30, 2005	Kitt Peak	Spacewatch	·	1.2 km	MPC · JPL
642203	2005 MO_{55}	—	July 25, 2015	Haleakala	Pan-STARRS 1	·	660 m	MPC · JPL
642204	2005 MP_{56}	—	June 28, 2005	Kitt Peak	Spacewatch	EOS	2.1 km	MPC · JPL
642205	2005 NS	—	July 2, 2005	Kitt Peak	Spacewatch	T_{j} (2.94)	3.2 km	MPC · JPL
642206	2005 NX_{3}	—	July 2, 2005	Kitt Peak	Spacewatch	·	530 m	MPC · JPL
642207	2005 NJ_{8}	—	July 1, 2005	Kitt Peak	Spacewatch	·	1.2 km	MPC · JPL
642208	2005 NU_{10}	—	July 3, 2005	Mount Lemmon	Mount Lemmon Survey	EUN	920 m	MPC · JPL
642209	2005 NG_{14}	—	July 5, 2005	Kitt Peak	Spacewatch	·	860 m	MPC · JPL
642210	2005 NU_{14}	—	July 4, 2005	Kitt Peak	Spacewatch	·	970 m	MPC · JPL
642211	2005 NM_{23}	—	July 4, 2005	Kitt Peak	Spacewatch	·	710 m	MPC · JPL
642212	2005 NQ_{23}	—	July 4, 2005	Kitt Peak	Spacewatch	·	2.4 km	MPC · JPL
642213	2005 NO_{24}	—	July 4, 2005	Kitt Peak	Spacewatch	·	1.2 km	MPC · JPL
642214	2005 NE_{25}	—	July 4, 2005	Kitt Peak	Spacewatch	·	2.0 km	MPC · JPL
642215	2005 NG_{26}	—	June 30, 2005	Palomar	NEAT	JUN	1.1 km	MPC · JPL
642216	2005 NB_{28}	—	October 23, 2001	Palomar	NEAT	GEF	1.3 km	MPC · JPL
642217	2005 NP_{28}	—	July 6, 2005	Kitt Peak	Spacewatch	·	930 m	MPC · JPL
642218	2005 NL_{37}	—	July 6, 2005	Kitt Peak	Spacewatch	·	2.5 km	MPC · JPL
642219	2005 NA_{39}	—	July 5, 2005	Palomar	NEAT	·	720 m	MPC · JPL
642220	2005 NY_{41}	—	July 5, 2005	Kitt Peak	Spacewatch	·	1.5 km	MPC · JPL
642221	2005 NF_{42}	—	July 5, 2005	Kitt Peak	Spacewatch	·	1.4 km	MPC · JPL
642222	2005 NK_{43}	—	July 5, 2005	Palomar	NEAT	·	730 m	MPC · JPL
642223	2005 NR_{44}	—	July 5, 2005	Mount Lemmon	Mount Lemmon Survey	·	1.5 km	MPC · JPL
642224	2005 NH_{45}	—	May 22, 2005	Palomar	NEAT	·	1.3 km	MPC · JPL
642225	2005 NA_{51}	—	July 6, 2005	Kitt Peak	Spacewatch	·	1.3 km	MPC · JPL
642226	2005 NA_{52}	—	July 8, 2005	Kitt Peak	Spacewatch	·	1.1 km	MPC · JPL
642227	2005 NM_{54}	—	July 1, 2005	Kitt Peak	Spacewatch	·	1.0 km	MPC · JPL
642228	2005 ND_{59}	—	June 27, 2005	Kitt Peak	Spacewatch	·	710 m	MPC · JPL
642229	2005 NW_{64}	—	July 1, 2005	Kitt Peak	Spacewatch	BRA	1.4 km	MPC · JPL
642230	2005 NT_{65}	—	July 1, 2005	Kitt Peak	Spacewatch	·	900 m	MPC · JPL
642231	2005 NE_{68}	—	July 3, 2005	Mount Lemmon	Mount Lemmon Survey	·	1.6 km	MPC · JPL
642232	2005 NC_{69}	—	July 3, 2005	Palomar	NEAT	·	700 m	MPC · JPL
642233	2005 NT_{69}	—	July 4, 2005	Mount Lemmon	Mount Lemmon Survey	·	1.1 km	MPC · JPL
642234	2005 NP_{72}	—	June 23, 2005	Palomar	NEAT	JUN	1.3 km	MPC · JPL
642235	2005 NG_{73}	—	July 4, 2005	Mount Lemmon	Mount Lemmon Survey	·	2.6 km	MPC · JPL
642236	2005 NK_{77}	—	July 10, 2005	Kitt Peak	Spacewatch	·	1.4 km	MPC · JPL
642237	2005 NE_{78}	—	July 11, 2005	Kitt Peak	Spacewatch	·	1.4 km	MPC · JPL
642238	2005 NS_{78}	—	July 12, 2005	Mount Lemmon	Mount Lemmon Survey	·	2.1 km	MPC · JPL
642239	2005 NV_{79}	—	July 9, 2005	Reedy Creek	J. Broughton	·	1.1 km	MPC · JPL
642240	2005 NJ_{81}	—	July 12, 2005	Mount Lemmon	Mount Lemmon Survey	·	2.3 km	MPC · JPL
642241	2005 NA_{83}	—	July 15, 2005	Reedy Creek	J. Broughton	·	1.9 km	MPC · JPL
642242	2005 NA_{86}	—	July 3, 2005	Mount Lemmon	Mount Lemmon Survey	EOS	1.6 km	MPC · JPL
642243	2005 NU_{88}	—	July 4, 2005	Mount Lemmon	Mount Lemmon Survey	·	700 m	MPC · JPL
642244	2005 NC_{95}	—	July 6, 2005	Kitt Peak	Spacewatch	3:2	4.3 km	MPC · JPL
642245	2005 NL_{97}	—	February 27, 2009	Kitt Peak	Spacewatch	·	2.8 km	MPC · JPL
642246	2005 NL_{98}	—	July 9, 2005	Kitt Peak	Spacewatch	·	1.2 km	MPC · JPL
642247	2005 NT_{98}	—	July 10, 2005	Kitt Peak	Spacewatch	EOS	1.6 km	MPC · JPL
642248	2005 NW_{98}	—	July 10, 2005	Kitt Peak	Spacewatch	·	1.8 km	MPC · JPL
642249	2005 NH_{106}	—	July 15, 2005	Mount Lemmon	Mount Lemmon Survey	·	1.2 km	MPC · JPL
642250	2005 NX_{116}	—	July 7, 2005	Mauna Kea	Veillet, C.	·	510 m	MPC · JPL
642251	2005 NQ_{117}	—	July 7, 2005	Mauna Kea	Veillet, C.	·	1.9 km	MPC · JPL
642252	2005 NO_{120}	—	July 7, 2005	Mauna Kea	Veillet, C.	EOS	1.5 km	MPC · JPL
642253	2005 NV_{126}	—	July 5, 2005	Mount Lemmon	Mount Lemmon Survey	NYS	890 m	MPC · JPL
642254	2005 NM_{127}	—	November 11, 2010	Mount Lemmon	Mount Lemmon Survey	·	1.3 km	MPC · JPL
642255	2005 NP_{127}	—	July 8, 2005	Kitt Peak	Spacewatch	·	2.0 km	MPC · JPL
642256	2005 ND_{129}	—	January 31, 2008	Mount Lemmon	Mount Lemmon Survey	·	2.4 km	MPC · JPL
642257	2005 NJ_{130}	—	November 12, 2010	Mount Lemmon	Mount Lemmon Survey	·	1.4 km	MPC · JPL
642258	2005 NN_{130}	—	July 10, 2005	Kitt Peak	Spacewatch	·	1.4 km	MPC · JPL
642259	2005 NR_{132}	—	July 12, 2005	Mount Lemmon	Mount Lemmon Survey	·	2.2 km	MPC · JPL
642260	2005 NO_{134}	—	July 1, 2005	Kitt Peak	Spacewatch	·	2.9 km	MPC · JPL
642261	2005 OB_{4}	—	June 28, 2005	Palomar	NEAT	·	2.8 km	MPC · JPL
642262	2005 OT_{21}	—	July 29, 2005	Palomar	NEAT	·	2.9 km	MPC · JPL
642263	2005 OY_{24}	—	July 31, 2005	Palomar	NEAT	T_{j} (2.91)	3.2 km	MPC · JPL
642264	2005 OT_{32}	—	July 30, 2005	Palomar	NEAT	·	740 m	MPC · JPL
642265	2005 OE_{33}	—	July 26, 2005	Palomar	NEAT	T_{j} (2.98) · EUP	3.0 km	MPC · JPL
642266	2005 ON_{33}	—	July 29, 2005	Palomar	NEAT	·	700 m	MPC · JPL
642267	2005 OX_{33}	—	January 27, 2017	Haleakala	Pan-STARRS 1	·	1.3 km	MPC · JPL
642268	2005 OZ_{33}	—	July 31, 2005	Palomar	NEAT	EUN	1.1 km	MPC · JPL
642269	2005 PK_{2}	—	July 4, 2005	Palomar	NEAT	·	2.8 km	MPC · JPL
642270	2005 PK_{6}	—	July 26, 2005	Palomar	NEAT	·	1.4 km	MPC · JPL
642271	2005 PJ_{10}	—	August 4, 2005	Palomar	NEAT	·	620 m	MPC · JPL
642272	2005 PY_{11}	—	August 4, 2005	Palomar	NEAT	·	750 m	MPC · JPL
642273	2005 PA_{12}	—	August 4, 2005	Palomar	NEAT	TIR	2.5 km	MPC · JPL
642274	2005 PN_{13}	—	July 27, 2005	Palomar	NEAT	·	2.8 km	MPC · JPL
642275	2005 PH_{20}	—	August 1, 2005	Vallemare Borbona	V. S. Casulli	·	1.0 km	MPC · JPL
642276	2005 PK_{20}	—	October 7, 2000	Kitt Peak	Spacewatch	·	2.3 km	MPC · JPL
642277	2005 PW_{20}	—	August 6, 2005	Palomar	NEAT	·	2.3 km	MPC · JPL
642278	2005 PF_{24}	—	August 27, 2005	Palomar	NEAT	·	700 m	MPC · JPL
642279	2005 PP_{27}	—	August 10, 2005	Mauna Kea	P. A. Wiegert, D. D. Balam	·	470 m	MPC · JPL
642280	2005 PA_{29}	—	August 30, 2005	Kitt Peak	Spacewatch	·	2.1 km	MPC · JPL
642281	2005 PD_{29}	—	August 6, 2005	Palomar	NEAT	(194)	1.6 km	MPC · JPL
642282	2005 PL_{29}	—	June 8, 2011	Mount Lemmon	Mount Lemmon Survey	·	2.6 km	MPC · JPL
642283	2005 PO_{29}	—	August 5, 2005	Palomar	NEAT	·	620 m	MPC · JPL
642284	2005 PT_{29}	—	March 30, 2008	Kitt Peak	Spacewatch	·	890 m	MPC · JPL
642285	2005 PV_{29}	—	August 4, 2005	Palomar	NEAT	·	1.6 km	MPC · JPL
642286	2005 PB_{30}	—	August 5, 2005	Palomar	NEAT	TIR	3.0 km	MPC · JPL
642287	2005 PA_{31}	—	March 22, 2014	Mount Lemmon	Mount Lemmon Survey	·	670 m	MPC · JPL
642288	2005 PJ_{31}	—	September 6, 2012	Mount Lemmon	Mount Lemmon Survey	·	600 m	MPC · JPL
642289	2005 QO_{4}	—	July 30, 2005	Palomar	NEAT	·	1.9 km	MPC · JPL
642290	2005 QO_{10}	—	July 30, 2005	Palomar	NEAT	·	1.9 km	MPC · JPL
642291	2005 QQ_{16}	—	August 25, 2005	Palomar	NEAT	·	1.8 km	MPC · JPL
642292	2005 QE_{17}	—	August 25, 2005	Palomar	NEAT	·	2.3 km	MPC · JPL
642293	2005 QK_{18}	—	August 25, 2005	Palomar	NEAT	·	680 m	MPC · JPL
642294	2005 QF_{20}	—	August 26, 2005	Anderson Mesa	LONEOS	ADE	2.2 km	MPC · JPL
642295	2005 QT_{22}	—	August 27, 2005	Kitt Peak	Spacewatch	·	2.3 km	MPC · JPL
642296	2005 QC_{29}	—	August 29, 2005	Wrightwood	J. W. Young	ADE	1.9 km	MPC · JPL
642297	2005 QA_{31}	—	August 29, 2005	Junk Bond	D. Healy	·	590 m	MPC · JPL
642298	2005 QO_{32}	—	August 24, 2005	Palomar	NEAT	·	1.6 km	MPC · JPL
642299	2005 QV_{34}	—	August 25, 2005	Palomar	NEAT	PHO	890 m	MPC · JPL
642300	2005 QC_{35}	—	August 25, 2005	Palomar	NEAT	·	2.3 km	MPC · JPL

== 642301–642400 ==
back to top

Designation			Discovery			Properties		Ref
Permanent	Provisional	Named after	Date	Site	Discoverer(s)	Category	Diam.	Ref
642301	2005 QZ_{36}	—	August 25, 2005	Palomar	NEAT	·	1.4 km	MPC · JPL
642302	2005 QT_{39}	—	June 17, 2005	Mount Lemmon	Mount Lemmon Survey	·	2.3 km	MPC · JPL
642303	2005 QH_{40}	—	August 5, 2005	Palomar	NEAT	·	1.9 km	MPC · JPL
642304	2005 QL_{43}	—	August 27, 2005	Anderson Mesa	LONEOS	THB	2.9 km	MPC · JPL
642305	2005 QV_{43}	—	August 28, 2005	Kitt Peak	Spacewatch	EOS	1.8 km	MPC · JPL
642306	2005 QC_{45}	—	August 28, 2005	Anderson Mesa	LONEOS	·	980 m	MPC · JPL
642307	2005 QC_{49}	—	August 28, 2005	Kitt Peak	Spacewatch	·	650 m	MPC · JPL
642308	2005 QR_{59}	—	August 25, 2005	Palomar	NEAT	·	1.3 km	MPC · JPL
642309	2005 QX_{59}	—	August 25, 2005	Palomar	NEAT	·	2.4 km	MPC · JPL
642310	2005 QA_{64}	—	August 26, 2005	Palomar	NEAT	·	2.2 km	MPC · JPL
642311	2005 QK_{64}	—	July 30, 2005	Palomar	NEAT	·	2.6 km	MPC · JPL
642312	2005 QA_{66}	—	July 29, 2005	Palomar	NEAT	·	2.2 km	MPC · JPL
642313	2005 QA_{73}	—	August 29, 2005	Kitt Peak	Spacewatch	·	2.2 km	MPC · JPL
642314	2005 QS_{74}	—	August 29, 2005	Anderson Mesa	LONEOS	·	2.6 km	MPC · JPL
642315	2005 QG_{76}	—	August 25, 2005	Palomar	NEAT	·	800 m	MPC · JPL
642316	2005 QY_{83}	—	August 29, 2005	Anderson Mesa	LONEOS	·	1.6 km	MPC · JPL
642317	2005 QC_{85}	—	August 30, 2005	Kitt Peak	Spacewatch	·	1.7 km	MPC · JPL
642318	2005 QK_{95}	—	February 26, 2004	Goodricke-Pigott	R. A. Tucker	H	660 m	MPC · JPL
642319	2005 QL_{97}	—	August 6, 2005	Palomar	NEAT	·	1.5 km	MPC · JPL
642320	2005 QA_{99}	—	July 30, 2005	Palomar	NEAT	·	840 m	MPC · JPL
642321	2005 QK_{99}	—	August 30, 2005	Kitt Peak	Spacewatch	·	810 m	MPC · JPL
642322	2005 QG_{100}	—	August 29, 2005	Kitt Peak	Spacewatch	·	2.5 km	MPC · JPL
642323	2005 QR_{101}	—	August 29, 2005	Kitt Peak	Spacewatch	·	1.9 km	MPC · JPL
642324	2005 QY_{101}	—	August 29, 2005	Kitt Peak	Spacewatch	·	1.3 km	MPC · JPL
642325	2005 QQ_{103}	—	August 29, 2005	Kitt Peak	Spacewatch	·	1.8 km	MPC · JPL
642326	2005 QL_{106}	—	August 28, 2005	Anderson Mesa	LONEOS	V	650 m	MPC · JPL
642327	2005 QS_{106}	—	July 30, 2005	Palomar	NEAT	·	1.4 km	MPC · JPL
642328	2005 QN_{107}	—	August 28, 2005	Anderson Mesa	LONEOS	·	920 m	MPC · JPL
642329	2005 QP_{107}	—	August 31, 2005	Kitt Peak	Spacewatch	MAR	870 m	MPC · JPL
642330	2005 QT_{108}	—	August 31, 2005	Kitt Peak	Spacewatch	·	1.5 km	MPC · JPL
642331	2005 QB_{110}	—	August 31, 2005	Kitt Peak	Spacewatch	MAR	1.0 km	MPC · JPL
642332	2005 QN_{111}	—	August 30, 2005	Kitt Peak	Spacewatch	·	1.4 km	MPC · JPL
642333	2005 QY_{119}	—	August 28, 2005	Kitt Peak	Spacewatch	·	1.3 km	MPC · JPL
642334	2005 QF_{120}	—	August 28, 2005	Kitt Peak	Spacewatch	·	550 m	MPC · JPL
642335	2005 QE_{122}	—	August 28, 2005	Kitt Peak	Spacewatch	EOS	1.5 km	MPC · JPL
642336	2005 QN_{125}	—	August 28, 2005	Kitt Peak	Spacewatch	·	3.2 km	MPC · JPL
642337	2005 QG_{126}	—	July 30, 2005	Palomar	NEAT	3:2	4.8 km	MPC · JPL
642338	2005 QZ_{127}	—	August 28, 2005	Kitt Peak	Spacewatch	·	940 m	MPC · JPL
642339	2005 QF_{130}	—	August 28, 2005	Kitt Peak	Spacewatch	·	2.3 km	MPC · JPL
642340	2005 QK_{134}	—	August 28, 2005	Kitt Peak	Spacewatch	·	1.3 km	MPC · JPL
642341	2005 QY_{139}	—	August 28, 2005	Kitt Peak	Spacewatch	TIR	2.1 km	MPC · JPL
642342	2005 QH_{141}	—	August 29, 2005	Črni Vrh	Matičič, S.	·	2.7 km	MPC · JPL
642343	2005 QV_{143}	—	August 26, 2005	Palomar	NEAT	·	1.6 km	MPC · JPL
642344	2005 QW_{143}	—	August 26, 2005	Palomar	NEAT	·	1.8 km	MPC · JPL
642345	2005 QP_{144}	—	August 27, 2005	Palomar	NEAT	·	1.0 km	MPC · JPL
642346	2005 QF_{153}	—	August 27, 2005	Palomar	NEAT	T_{j} (2.98)	3.3 km	MPC · JPL
642347	2005 QG_{156}	—	August 31, 2005	Socorro	LINEAR	·	2.0 km	MPC · JPL
642348	2005 QS_{156}	—	September 1, 2005	Anderson Mesa	LONEOS	·	3.4 km	MPC · JPL
642349	2005 QB_{159}	—	August 27, 2005	Kitt Peak	Spacewatch	·	1.4 km	MPC · JPL
642350	2005 QX_{162}	—	July 28, 2005	Palomar	NEAT	·	660 m	MPC · JPL
642351	2005 QH_{163}	—	August 30, 2005	Kitt Peak	Spacewatch	·	610 m	MPC · JPL
642352	2005 QC_{165}	—	September 3, 2005	Palomar	NEAT	JUN	1.1 km	MPC · JPL
642353	2005 QP_{167}	—	August 27, 2005	Palomar	NEAT	·	1.4 km	MPC · JPL
642354	2005 QP_{168}	—	August 30, 2005	Palomar	NEAT	·	1.8 km	MPC · JPL
642355	2005 QH_{171}	—	August 30, 2005	Palomar	NEAT	·	1.0 km	MPC · JPL
642356	2005 QY_{173}	—	August 31, 2005	Kitt Peak	Spacewatch	·	2.4 km	MPC · JPL
642357	2005 QA_{175}	—	August 3, 2005	Palomar	NEAT	·	680 m	MPC · JPL
642358	2005 QF_{176}	—	August 31, 2005	Kitt Peak	Spacewatch	·	820 m	MPC · JPL
642359	2005 QD_{179}	—	August 25, 2005	Palomar	NEAT	·	1.7 km	MPC · JPL
642360	2005 QY_{180}	—	August 29, 2005	Palomar	NEAT	JUN	910 m	MPC · JPL
642361	2005 QU_{184}	—	August 30, 2005	Mauna Kea	P. A. Wiegert	·	1.1 km	MPC · JPL
642362	2005 QJ_{186}	—	December 31, 2007	Kitt Peak	Spacewatch	·	2.0 km	MPC · JPL
642363	2005 QT_{186}	—	August 25, 2005	Palomar	NEAT	V	500 m	MPC · JPL
642364	2005 QX_{186}	—	August 26, 2005	Palomar	NEAT	PHO	930 m	MPC · JPL
642365	2005 QX_{187}	—	August 27, 2005	Palomar	NEAT	·	560 m	MPC · JPL
642366	2005 QS_{191}	—	August 25, 2005	Palomar	NEAT	MAS	720 m	MPC · JPL
642367	2005 QX_{191}	—	August 25, 2005	Palomar	NEAT	NYS	910 m	MPC · JPL
642368	2005 QH_{192}	—	May 18, 2015	Haleakala	Pan-STARRS 1	·	2.6 km	MPC · JPL
642369	2005 QP_{192}	—	May 15, 2013	Haleakala	Pan-STARRS 1	·	1.4 km	MPC · JPL
642370	2005 QG_{193}	—	August 30, 2005	Kitt Peak	Spacewatch	(5)	1.1 km	MPC · JPL
642371	2005 QR_{193}	—	February 10, 2008	Kitt Peak	Spacewatch	·	1.6 km	MPC · JPL
642372	2005 QV_{193}	—	August 28, 2005	Kitt Peak	Spacewatch	·	2.2 km	MPC · JPL
642373	2005 QY_{193}	—	August 26, 2005	Palomar	NEAT	·	2.5 km	MPC · JPL
642374	2005 QH_{194}	—	September 15, 2012	Kitt Peak	Spacewatch	·	560 m	MPC · JPL
642375	2005 QC_{195}	—	July 12, 2016	Haleakala	Pan-STARRS 1	·	2.0 km	MPC · JPL
642376	2005 QO_{195}	—	June 16, 2015	Mount Lemmon	Mount Lemmon Survey	·	2.1 km	MPC · JPL
642377	2005 QP_{195}	—	August 26, 2005	Palomar	NEAT	·	1.2 km	MPC · JPL
642378	2005 QU_{195}	—	August 31, 2005	Palomar	NEAT	·	2.7 km	MPC · JPL
642379	2005 QF_{196}	—	August 29, 2005	Kitt Peak	Spacewatch	·	800 m	MPC · JPL
642380	2005 QN_{196}	—	August 26, 2005	Palomar	NEAT	·	740 m	MPC · JPL
642381	2005 QT_{196}	—	August 29, 2005	Kitt Peak	Spacewatch	·	1.7 km	MPC · JPL
642382	2005 QV_{197}	—	August 31, 2005	Kitt Peak	Spacewatch	(2076)	630 m	MPC · JPL
642383	2005 QY_{197}	—	September 17, 2012	Mount Lemmon	Mount Lemmon Survey	·	650 m	MPC · JPL
642384	2005 QZ_{197}	—	August 29, 2005	Palomar	NEAT	·	1.3 km	MPC · JPL
642385	2005 QH_{198}	—	July 29, 2005	Palomar	NEAT	·	900 m	MPC · JPL
642386	2005 QP_{198}	—	September 17, 2012	Mount Lemmon	Mount Lemmon Survey	·	530 m	MPC · JPL
642387	2005 QQ_{198}	—	November 20, 2009	Kitt Peak	Spacewatch	·	610 m	MPC · JPL
642388	2005 QL_{199}	—	August 31, 2005	Campo Imperatore	CINEOS	·	1.6 km	MPC · JPL
642389	2005 QR_{199}	—	August 31, 2005	Kitt Peak	Spacewatch	·	1.3 km	MPC · JPL
642390	2005 QT_{199}	—	December 20, 2016	Mount Lemmon	Mount Lemmon Survey	·	850 m	MPC · JPL
642391	2005 QZ_{199}	—	August 30, 2005	Kitt Peak	Spacewatch	·	470 m	MPC · JPL
642392	2005 QB_{200}	—	January 26, 2007	Kitt Peak	Spacewatch	·	1.2 km	MPC · JPL
642393	2005 QG_{200}	—	August 30, 2005	Kitt Peak	Spacewatch	(5)	1.1 km	MPC · JPL
642394	2005 QB_{202}	—	August 31, 2005	Kitt Peak	Spacewatch	·	820 m	MPC · JPL
642395	2005 QS_{202}	—	August 30, 2005	Kitt Peak	Spacewatch	·	2.1 km	MPC · JPL
642396	2005 QY_{202}	—	August 29, 2014	Haleakala	Pan-STARRS 1	JUN	840 m	MPC · JPL
642397	2005 QD_{203}	—	August 26, 2005	Palomar	NEAT	KON	2.4 km	MPC · JPL
642398	2005 QH_{204}	—	January 18, 2016	Haleakala	Pan-STARRS 1	·	1.0 km	MPC · JPL
642399	2005 QJ_{204}	—	August 31, 2005	Palomar	NEAT	·	670 m	MPC · JPL
642400	2005 QK_{204}	—	August 30, 2005	Kitt Peak	Spacewatch	·	1.4 km	MPC · JPL

== 642401–642500 ==
back to top

Designation			Discovery			Properties		Ref
Permanent	Provisional	Named after	Date	Site	Discoverer(s)	Category	Diam.	Ref
642401	2005 QM_{204}	—	August 28, 2005	Kitt Peak	Spacewatch	·	550 m	MPC · JPL
642402	2005 QO_{204}	—	August 30, 2005	Kitt Peak	Spacewatch	THM	2.0 km	MPC · JPL
642403	2005 QV_{204}	—	August 25, 2005	Campo Imperatore	CINEOS	·	2.0 km	MPC · JPL
642404	2005 QS_{206}	—	August 24, 2005	Palomar	NEAT	·	1.2 km	MPC · JPL
642405	2005 QU_{206}	—	August 30, 2005	Kitt Peak	Spacewatch	·	2.2 km	MPC · JPL
642406	2005 QV_{206}	—	August 31, 2005	Palomar	NEAT	·	1.7 km	MPC · JPL
642407	2005 QJ_{208}	—	August 29, 2005	Kitt Peak	Spacewatch	·	2.4 km	MPC · JPL
642408	2005 QN_{208}	—	August 29, 2005	Kitt Peak	Spacewatch	·	2.6 km	MPC · JPL
642409	2005 QT_{209}	—	August 31, 2005	Palomar	NEAT	·	3.2 km	MPC · JPL
642410	2005 QD_{211}	—	August 29, 2005	Kitt Peak	Spacewatch	VER	2.1 km	MPC · JPL
642411	2005 RV_{3}	—	September 5, 2005	Cordell-Lorenz	Cordell-Lorenz	·	2.1 km	MPC · JPL
642412	2005 RP_{5}	—	September 1, 2005	Kitt Peak	Spacewatch	·	790 m	MPC · JPL
642413	2005 RR_{12}	—	September 1, 2005	Kitt Peak	Spacewatch	·	2.2 km	MPC · JPL
642414	2005 RJ_{13}	—	September 1, 2005	Kitt Peak	Spacewatch	·	860 m	MPC · JPL
642415	2005 RL_{15}	—	September 1, 2005	Kitt Peak	Spacewatch	·	1.3 km	MPC · JPL
642416	2005 RY_{16}	—	September 1, 2005	Kitt Peak	Spacewatch	·	2.1 km	MPC · JPL
642417	2005 RJ_{18}	—	September 1, 2005	Kitt Peak	Spacewatch	·	2.2 km	MPC · JPL
642418	2005 RS_{20}	—	September 1, 2005	Palomar	NEAT	·	770 m	MPC · JPL
642419	2005 RP_{26}	—	August 25, 2005	Palomar	NEAT	·	1.8 km	MPC · JPL
642420	2005 RX_{31}	—	August 30, 2005	Kitt Peak	Spacewatch	THM	1.8 km	MPC · JPL
642421	2005 RR_{36}	—	September 3, 2005	Mauna Kea	Veillet, C.	·	2.5 km	MPC · JPL
642422	2005 RU_{36}	—	September 3, 2005	Mauna Kea	Veillet, C.	·	1.8 km	MPC · JPL
642423	2005 RT_{46}	—	October 1, 2005	Apache Point	SDSS Collaboration	·	2.5 km	MPC · JPL
642424	2005 RH_{47}	—	March 18, 2004	Kitt Peak	Spacewatch	·	2.1 km	MPC · JPL
642425	2005 RY_{47}	—	December 1, 2005	Mount Lemmon	Mount Lemmon Survey	NEM	1.9 km	MPC · JPL
642426	2005 RE_{48}	—	September 15, 2005	Apache Point	SDSS Collaboration	·	730 m	MPC · JPL
642427	2005 RL_{52}	—	August 27, 2005	Kitt Peak	Spacewatch	·	1.3 km	MPC · JPL
642428	2005 RU_{52}	—	September 12, 2005	Kitt Peak	Spacewatch	·	1.9 km	MPC · JPL
642429	2005 RZ_{52}	—	September 1, 2005	Kitt Peak	Spacewatch	·	2.9 km	MPC · JPL
642430	2005 RC_{54}	—	September 2, 2011	Haleakala	Pan-STARRS 1	·	2.5 km	MPC · JPL
642431	2005 RD_{54}	—	July 4, 2013	Haleakala	Pan-STARRS 1	·	1.2 km	MPC · JPL
642432	2005 RG_{54}	—	September 19, 2014	Haleakala	Pan-STARRS 1	·	1.6 km	MPC · JPL
642433	2005 RJ_{54}	—	October 5, 2012	Haleakala	Pan-STARRS 1	·	690 m	MPC · JPL
642434	2005 RP_{54}	—	February 13, 2013	Haleakala	Pan-STARRS 1	T_{j} (2.98)	2.9 km	MPC · JPL
642435	2005 RB_{55}	—	October 6, 2012	Mount Lemmon	Mount Lemmon Survey	·	610 m	MPC · JPL
642436	2005 RC_{55}	—	February 20, 2014	Mount Lemmon	Mount Lemmon Survey	·	2.2 km	MPC · JPL
642437	2005 RN_{55}	—	September 11, 2005	Kitt Peak	Spacewatch	·	600 m	MPC · JPL
642438	2005 RQ_{55}	—	November 17, 2014	Mount Lemmon	Mount Lemmon Survey	·	1.3 km	MPC · JPL
642439	2005 RR_{55}	—	August 9, 2015	Haleakala	Pan-STARRS 1	H	510 m	MPC · JPL
642440	2005 RT_{56}	—	August 25, 2012	Haleakala	Pan-STARRS 1	·	780 m	MPC · JPL
642441	2005 RV_{56}	—	November 10, 2009	Kitt Peak	Spacewatch	·	670 m	MPC · JPL
642442	2005 RE_{57}	—	September 14, 2005	Kitt Peak	Spacewatch	·	560 m	MPC · JPL
642443	2005 RH_{57}	—	September 14, 2005	Kitt Peak	Spacewatch	·	1.3 km	MPC · JPL
642444	2005 RL_{57}	—	October 21, 2014	Kitt Peak	Spacewatch	·	1.2 km	MPC · JPL
642445	2005 RQ_{58}	—	September 12, 2005	Kitt Peak	Spacewatch	·	2.3 km	MPC · JPL
642446	2005 RE_{59}	—	August 27, 2005	Campo Imperatore	CINEOS	·	1.1 km	MPC · JPL
642447	2005 RU_{59}	—	September 1, 2005	Kitt Peak	Spacewatch	(5)	1.1 km	MPC · JPL
642448	2005 RX_{60}	—	September 1, 2005	Kitt Peak	Spacewatch	·	1.3 km	MPC · JPL
642449	2005 RJ_{62}	—	September 14, 2005	Kitt Peak	Spacewatch	(69559)	2.0 km	MPC · JPL
642450	2005 RO_{63}	—	September 13, 2005	Kitt Peak	Spacewatch	THM	1.9 km	MPC · JPL
642451	2005 SU_{7}	—	September 25, 2005	Catalina	CSS	·	1.3 km	MPC · JPL
642452	2005 SH_{8}	—	September 25, 2005	Kitt Peak	Spacewatch	·	1.1 km	MPC · JPL
642453	2005 SO_{12}	—	August 30, 2005	Palomar	NEAT	·	790 m	MPC · JPL
642454	2005 SY_{17}	—	September 26, 2005	Kitt Peak	Spacewatch	MIS	2.0 km	MPC · JPL
642455	2005 SB_{18}	—	September 26, 2005	Kitt Peak	Spacewatch	(5)	1.1 km	MPC · JPL
642456	2005 SY_{21}	—	August 31, 2005	Kitt Peak	Spacewatch	·	1.5 km	MPC · JPL
642457	2005 SV_{22}	—	September 23, 2005	Kitt Peak	Spacewatch	·	1.4 km	MPC · JPL
642458	2005 SX_{24}	—	August 31, 2005	Palomar	NEAT	·	1.6 km	MPC · JPL
642459	2005 SO_{33}	—	September 23, 2005	Kitt Peak	Spacewatch	·	550 m	MPC · JPL
642460	2005 SK_{37}	—	September 24, 2005	Kitt Peak	Spacewatch	·	650 m	MPC · JPL
642461	2005 SH_{40}	—	September 24, 2005	Kitt Peak	Spacewatch	·	1.6 km	MPC · JPL
642462	2005 SS_{40}	—	September 24, 2005	Kitt Peak	Spacewatch	·	660 m	MPC · JPL
642463	2005 SZ_{40}	—	September 24, 2005	Kitt Peak	Spacewatch	AGN	860 m	MPC · JPL
642464	2005 SB_{52}	—	September 24, 2005	Kitt Peak	Spacewatch	·	1.5 km	MPC · JPL
642465	2005 SH_{54}	—	September 25, 2005	Kitt Peak	Spacewatch	·	1.1 km	MPC · JPL
642466	2005 SA_{55}	—	September 25, 2005	Kitt Peak	Spacewatch	JUN	720 m	MPC · JPL
642467	2005 SE_{59}	—	September 26, 2005	Kitt Peak	Spacewatch	·	1.3 km	MPC · JPL
642468	2005 SW_{59}	—	September 26, 2005	Kitt Peak	Spacewatch	·	760 m	MPC · JPL
642469	2005 SC_{60}	—	September 26, 2005	Kitt Peak	Spacewatch	·	700 m	MPC · JPL
642470	2005 SZ_{62}	—	September 26, 2005	Palomar	NEAT	·	2.6 km	MPC · JPL
642471	2005 SV_{65}	—	September 1, 2005	Palomar	NEAT	EUN	1.0 km	MPC · JPL
642472	2005 SZ_{72}	—	September 23, 2005	Kitt Peak	Spacewatch	·	950 m	MPC · JPL
642473	2005 SM_{77}	—	September 24, 2005	Kitt Peak	Spacewatch	·	550 m	MPC · JPL
642474	2005 SK_{78}	—	September 24, 2005	Kitt Peak	Spacewatch	THM	1.8 km	MPC · JPL
642475	2005 SO_{82}	—	September 24, 2005	Kitt Peak	Spacewatch	·	1.1 km	MPC · JPL
642476	2005 SC_{88}	—	September 24, 2005	Kitt Peak	Spacewatch	·	1.3 km	MPC · JPL
642477	2005 SC_{95}	—	September 1, 2005	Palomar	NEAT	·	1.4 km	MPC · JPL
642478	2005 SS_{98}	—	September 25, 2005	Kitt Peak	Spacewatch	·	2.5 km	MPC · JPL
642479	2005 SO_{99}	—	April 25, 2004	Kitt Peak	Spacewatch	·	1.4 km	MPC · JPL
642480	2005 SY_{101}	—	September 25, 2005	Kitt Peak	Spacewatch	·	1.2 km	MPC · JPL
642481	2005 SS_{104}	—	September 25, 2005	Kitt Peak	Spacewatch	·	1.7 km	MPC · JPL
642482	2005 SO_{107}	—	September 26, 2005	Catalina	CSS	·	1.3 km	MPC · JPL
642483	2005 SY_{113}	—	September 27, 2005	Kitt Peak	Spacewatch	·	2.8 km	MPC · JPL
642484	2005 SO_{116}	—	September 27, 2005	Palomar	NEAT	·	770 m	MPC · JPL
642485	2005 SK_{117}	—	September 6, 2005	Socorro	LINEAR	·	750 m	MPC · JPL
642486	2005 SM_{118}	—	August 31, 2005	Palomar	NEAT	·	750 m	MPC · JPL
642487	2005 SG_{122}	—	September 1, 2005	Palomar	NEAT	THB	3.1 km	MPC · JPL
642488	2005 SJ_{122}	—	September 23, 2005	Kitt Peak	Spacewatch	TIR	3.3 km	MPC · JPL
642489	2005 SZ_{127}	—	September 29, 2005	Mount Lemmon	Mount Lemmon Survey	VER	2.2 km	MPC · JPL
642490	2005 SV_{131}	—	September 29, 2005	Kitt Peak	Spacewatch	·	1.2 km	MPC · JPL
642491	2005 SE_{137}	—	September 24, 2005	Kitt Peak	Spacewatch	HNS	1.0 km	MPC · JPL
642492	2005 SH_{142}	—	September 25, 2005	Kitt Peak	Spacewatch	·	1.1 km	MPC · JPL
642493	2005 SW_{142}	—	September 25, 2005	Kitt Peak	Spacewatch	·	2.3 km	MPC · JPL
642494	2005 SQ_{144}	—	September 25, 2005	Kitt Peak	Spacewatch	(5)	1.1 km	MPC · JPL
642495	2005 SP_{151}	—	September 25, 2005	Kitt Peak	Spacewatch	·	1.8 km	MPC · JPL
642496	2005 SN_{152}	—	September 25, 2005	Palomar	NEAT	·	1.9 km	MPC · JPL
642497	2005 SE_{155}	—	September 26, 2005	Kitt Peak	Spacewatch	(11097)	2.3 km	MPC · JPL
642498	2005 SL_{160}	—	September 27, 2005	Kitt Peak	Spacewatch	·	1.3 km	MPC · JPL
642499	2005 SX_{163}	—	September 27, 2005	Palomar	NEAT	JUN	1.2 km	MPC · JPL
642500	2005 SZ_{165}	—	August 31, 2005	Palomar	NEAT	·	3.4 km	MPC · JPL

== 642501–642600 ==
back to top

Designation			Discovery			Properties		Ref
Permanent	Provisional	Named after	Date	Site	Discoverer(s)	Category	Diam.	Ref
642501	2005 SC_{168}	—	September 29, 2005	Kitt Peak	Spacewatch	EOS	1.4 km	MPC · JPL
642502	2005 SD_{168}	—	September 29, 2005	Kitt Peak	Spacewatch	·	2.1 km	MPC · JPL
642503	2005 SL_{169}	—	September 29, 2005	Kitt Peak	Spacewatch	·	760 m	MPC · JPL
642504	2005 SO_{174}	—	September 29, 2005	Kitt Peak	Spacewatch	V	430 m	MPC · JPL
642505	2005 SD_{175}	—	September 29, 2005	Kitt Peak	Spacewatch	·	1.8 km	MPC · JPL
642506	2005 SG_{175}	—	September 29, 2005	Kitt Peak	Spacewatch	·	1.5 km	MPC · JPL
642507	2005 SK_{175}	—	September 29, 2005	Kitt Peak	Spacewatch	·	2.0 km	MPC · JPL
642508	2005 SD_{176}	—	September 29, 2005	Kitt Peak	Spacewatch	·	1.3 km	MPC · JPL
642509	2005 SX_{178}	—	September 29, 2005	Anderson Mesa	LONEOS	·	660 m	MPC · JPL
642510	2005 SW_{181}	—	September 29, 2005	Kitt Peak	Spacewatch	·	1.3 km	MPC · JPL
642511	2005 SE_{183}	—	September 29, 2005	Kitt Peak	Spacewatch	WIT	880 m	MPC · JPL
642512	2005 SF_{183}	—	September 29, 2005	Kitt Peak	Spacewatch	·	1.4 km	MPC · JPL
642513	2005 SV_{185}	—	September 29, 2005	Kitt Peak	Spacewatch	·	2.0 km	MPC · JPL
642514	2005 SL_{188}	—	September 29, 2005	Mount Lemmon	Mount Lemmon Survey	(12739)	1.3 km	MPC · JPL
642515	2005 SC_{189}	—	September 29, 2005	Mount Lemmon	Mount Lemmon Survey	MAS	500 m	MPC · JPL
642516	2005 SX_{190}	—	September 29, 2005	Anderson Mesa	LONEOS	V	780 m	MPC · JPL
642517	2005 SY_{196}	—	September 30, 2005	Kitt Peak	Spacewatch	·	2.1 km	MPC · JPL
642518	2005 SR_{198}	—	September 30, 2005	Mount Lemmon	Mount Lemmon Survey	·	550 m	MPC · JPL
642519	2005 SB_{202}	—	August 29, 2005	Palomar	NEAT	·	770 m	MPC · JPL
642520	2005 SH_{210}	—	September 30, 2005	Palomar	NEAT	H	470 m	MPC · JPL
642521	2005 SJ_{225}	—	September 29, 2005	Mount Lemmon	Mount Lemmon Survey	·	1.2 km	MPC · JPL
642522	2005 SS_{226}	—	March 6, 2002	Palomar	NEAT	·	3.2 km	MPC · JPL
642523	2005 SS_{227}	—	September 30, 2005	Kitt Peak	Spacewatch	·	1.5 km	MPC · JPL
642524	2005 SU_{227}	—	September 30, 2005	Kitt Peak	Spacewatch	·	640 m	MPC · JPL
642525	2005 SN_{228}	—	September 30, 2005	Mount Lemmon	Mount Lemmon Survey	V	600 m	MPC · JPL
642526	2005 SG_{230}	—	April 7, 2003	Kitt Peak	Spacewatch	·	1.6 km	MPC · JPL
642527	2005 SX_{230}	—	September 30, 2005	Mount Lemmon	Mount Lemmon Survey	THM	2.4 km	MPC · JPL
642528	2005 SJ_{236}	—	September 29, 2005	Kitt Peak	Spacewatch	·	810 m	MPC · JPL
642529	2005 SE_{237}	—	September 29, 2005	Kitt Peak	Spacewatch	·	2.8 km	MPC · JPL
642530	2005 SU_{237}	—	March 24, 2003	Kitt Peak	Spacewatch	·	1.8 km	MPC · JPL
642531	2005 ST_{241}	—	September 30, 2005	Kitt Peak	Spacewatch	·	1.9 km	MPC · JPL
642532	2005 SD_{242}	—	September 30, 2005	Kitt Peak	Spacewatch	EUN	900 m	MPC · JPL
642533	2005 SG_{244}	—	September 30, 2005	Mount Lemmon	Mount Lemmon Survey	·	1.0 km	MPC · JPL
642534	2005 SE_{248}	—	September 30, 2005	Kitt Peak	Spacewatch	THM	1.8 km	MPC · JPL
642535	2005 SZ_{250}	—	September 23, 2005	Kitt Peak	Spacewatch	·	960 m	MPC · JPL
642536	2005 SL_{252}	—	August 27, 2005	Palomar	NEAT	·	1.4 km	MPC · JPL
642537	2005 SS_{252}	—	August 31, 2005	Palomar	NEAT	·	1.3 km	MPC · JPL
642538	2005 SQ_{256}	—	August 31, 2005	Kitt Peak	Spacewatch	·	1.3 km	MPC · JPL
642539	2005 SS_{258}	—	September 23, 2005	Junk Bond	D. Healy	·	780 m	MPC · JPL
642540	2005 SN_{264}	—	August 30, 2005	Palomar	NEAT	·	2.1 km	MPC · JPL
642541	2005 SG_{266}	—	September 29, 2005	Anderson Mesa	LONEOS	·	790 m	MPC · JPL
642542	2005 SD_{267}	—	September 29, 2005	Mount Lemmon	Mount Lemmon Survey	·	1.7 km	MPC · JPL
642543	2005 SY_{267}	—	August 31, 2005	Palomar	NEAT	·	610 m	MPC · JPL
642544	2005 ST_{270}	—	September 30, 2005	Anderson Mesa	LONEOS	PHO	860 m	MPC · JPL
642545	2005 SG_{274}	—	September 29, 2005	Kitt Peak	Spacewatch	EOS	1.4 km	MPC · JPL
642546	2005 SP_{275}	—	September 29, 2005	Kitt Peak	Spacewatch	·	2.5 km	MPC · JPL
642547	2005 SS_{275}	—	September 29, 2005	Kitt Peak	Spacewatch	·	720 m	MPC · JPL
642548	2005 SE_{276}	—	September 29, 2005	Kitt Peak	Spacewatch	·	1.3 km	MPC · JPL
642549	2005 SE_{282}	—	October 1, 2005	Apache Point	SDSS Collaboration	·	2.3 km	MPC · JPL
642550	2005 SC_{285}	—	October 1, 2005	Apache Point	SDSS Collaboration	·	1.7 km	MPC · JPL
642551	2005 SQ_{285}	—	October 1, 2005	Apache Point	SDSS Collaboration	EUN	870 m	MPC · JPL
642552	2005 SA_{286}	—	September 3, 2005	Apache Point	SDSS Collaboration	·	1.5 km	MPC · JPL
642553	2005 SV_{286}	—	October 1, 2005	Apache Point	SDSS Collaboration	·	1.2 km	MPC · JPL
642554	2005 SU_{288}	—	October 1, 2005	Apache Point	SDSS Collaboration	·	2.6 km	MPC · JPL
642555	2005 SR_{290}	—	September 23, 2005	Kitt Peak	Spacewatch	·	1.2 km	MPC · JPL
642556	2005 SC_{294}	—	September 30, 2005	Mauna Kea	A. Boattini	·	1.5 km	MPC · JPL
642557	2005 SG_{294}	—	September 26, 2005	Kitt Peak	Spacewatch	·	1.3 km	MPC · JPL
642558	2005 SO_{294}	—	September 29, 2005	Mount Lemmon	Mount Lemmon Survey	·	810 m	MPC · JPL
642559	2005 SX_{294}	—	September 30, 2005	Mount Lemmon	Mount Lemmon Survey	·	3.1 km	MPC · JPL
642560	2005 SB_{296}	—	April 6, 2008	Mount Lemmon	Mount Lemmon Survey	·	1.3 km	MPC · JPL
642561	2005 SX_{297}	—	May 8, 2014	Haleakala	Pan-STARRS 1	·	2.3 km	MPC · JPL
642562	2005 SL_{298}	—	September 30, 2005	Kitt Peak	Spacewatch	·	1.5 km	MPC · JPL
642563	2005 SQ_{300}	—	September 30, 2005	Mount Lemmon	Mount Lemmon Survey	AGN	820 m	MPC · JPL
642564	2005 SC_{303}	—	September 26, 2005	Palomar	NEAT	·	2.5 km	MPC · JPL
642565	2005 SS_{305}	—	September 30, 2005	Mount Lemmon	Mount Lemmon Survey	·	2.5 km	MPC · JPL
642566	2005 TR_{2}	—	October 1, 2005	Catalina	CSS	·	1.6 km	MPC · JPL
642567	2005 TR_{30}	—	October 23, 2001	Palomar	NEAT	ADE	1.7 km	MPC · JPL
642568	2005 TQ_{32}	—	October 1, 2005	Kitt Peak	Spacewatch	EUN	950 m	MPC · JPL
642569	2005 TC_{35}	—	October 1, 2005	Kitt Peak	Spacewatch	·	630 m	MPC · JPL
642570	2005 TA_{37}	—	October 1, 2005	Mount Lemmon	Mount Lemmon Survey	·	2.1 km	MPC · JPL
642571	2005 TU_{37}	—	October 1, 2005	Mount Lemmon	Mount Lemmon Survey	·	710 m	MPC · JPL
642572	2005 TK_{44}	—	October 5, 2005	Mount Lemmon	Mount Lemmon Survey	·	2.5 km	MPC · JPL
642573	2005 TB_{46}	—	September 30, 2005	Palomar	NEAT	·	870 m	MPC · JPL
642574	2005 TL_{47}	—	September 1, 2005	Palomar	NEAT	·	800 m	MPC · JPL
642575	2005 TD_{53}	—	August 31, 2005	Palomar	NEAT	·	1.7 km	MPC · JPL
642576	2005 TK_{57}	—	October 1, 2005	Mount Lemmon	Mount Lemmon Survey	·	2.3 km	MPC · JPL
642577	2005 TG_{60}	—	September 1, 2005	Kitt Peak	Spacewatch	·	2.4 km	MPC · JPL
642578	2005 TR_{60}	—	October 1, 2005	Catalina	CSS	·	1.2 km	MPC · JPL
642579	2005 TE_{66}	—	September 14, 2005	Catalina	CSS	·	870 m	MPC · JPL
642580	2005 TU_{67}	—	October 5, 2005	Mount Lemmon	Mount Lemmon Survey	·	590 m	MPC · JPL
642581	2005 TL_{69}	—	October 6, 2005	Mount Lemmon	Mount Lemmon Survey	·	2.0 km	MPC · JPL
642582	2005 TJ_{76}	—	August 25, 2005	Palomar	NEAT	·	1.8 km	MPC · JPL
642583	2005 TH_{77}	—	August 30, 2005	Palomar	NEAT	·	1.5 km	MPC · JPL
642584	2005 TF_{78}	—	September 3, 2005	Palomar	NEAT	·	2.9 km	MPC · JPL
642585	2005 TO_{79}	—	August 27, 2005	Palomar	NEAT	·	2.0 km	MPC · JPL
642586	2005 TO_{80}	—	October 3, 2005	Kitt Peak	Spacewatch	·	1.2 km	MPC · JPL
642587	2005 TM_{84}	—	October 3, 2005	Kitt Peak	Spacewatch	·	1.0 km	MPC · JPL
642588	2005 TD_{87}	—	September 29, 2005	Mount Lemmon	Mount Lemmon Survey	·	3.0 km	MPC · JPL
642589	2005 TS_{91}	—	August 29, 2005	Palomar	NEAT	·	910 m	MPC · JPL
642590	2005 TG_{92}	—	September 25, 2005	Kitt Peak	Spacewatch	·	1.3 km	MPC · JPL
642591	2005 TF_{94}	—	October 6, 2005	Kitt Peak	Spacewatch	·	2.4 km	MPC · JPL
642592	2005 TM_{97}	—	October 6, 2005	Mount Lemmon	Mount Lemmon Survey	·	2.9 km	MPC · JPL
642593	2005 TM_{99}	—	October 1, 2005	Catalina	CSS	·	1.1 km	MPC · JPL
642594	2005 TV_{107}	—	August 25, 2005	Palomar	NEAT	·	920 m	MPC · JPL
642595	2005 TE_{110}	—	October 7, 2005	Kitt Peak	Spacewatch	·	2.3 km	MPC · JPL
642596	2005 TG_{110}	—	October 7, 2005	Kitt Peak	Spacewatch	·	1.2 km	MPC · JPL
642597	2005 TL_{110}	—	October 1, 2005	Catalina	CSS	·	2.1 km	MPC · JPL
642598	2005 TM_{113}	—	October 7, 2005	Kitt Peak	Spacewatch	·	1.1 km	MPC · JPL
642599	2005 TN_{113}	—	April 4, 2003	Kitt Peak	Spacewatch	·	2.9 km	MPC · JPL
642600	2005 TW_{114}	—	October 7, 2005	Kitt Peak	Spacewatch	·	960 m	MPC · JPL

== 642601–642700 ==
back to top

Designation			Discovery			Properties		Ref
Permanent	Provisional	Named after	Date	Site	Discoverer(s)	Category	Diam.	Ref
642601	2005 TV_{115}	—	October 7, 2005	Kitt Peak	Spacewatch	·	690 m	MPC · JPL
642602	2005 TD_{116}	—	October 7, 2005	Kitt Peak	Spacewatch	·	760 m	MPC · JPL
642603	2005 TZ_{116}	—	October 7, 2005	Kitt Peak	Spacewatch	WIT	850 m	MPC · JPL
642604	2005 TC_{118}	—	October 7, 2005	Kitt Peak	Spacewatch	·	1.5 km	MPC · JPL
642605	2005 TP_{119}	—	September 26, 2005	Kitt Peak	Spacewatch	·	2.3 km	MPC · JPL
642606	2005 TL_{123}	—	September 26, 2005	Kitt Peak	Spacewatch	·	2.3 km	MPC · JPL
642607	2005 TQ_{125}	—	September 30, 2005	Kitt Peak	Spacewatch	·	670 m	MPC · JPL
642608	2005 TE_{129}	—	September 29, 2005	Mount Lemmon	Mount Lemmon Survey	·	1.5 km	MPC · JPL
642609	2005 TZ_{133}	—	October 10, 2005	Catalina	CSS	·	2.6 km	MPC · JPL
642610	2005 TL_{137}	—	September 25, 2005	Palomar	NEAT	H	580 m	MPC · JPL
642611	2005 TD_{143}	—	October 8, 2005	Kitt Peak	Spacewatch	HYG	1.9 km	MPC · JPL
642612	2005 TX_{144}	—	October 8, 2005	Kitt Peak	Spacewatch	·	1.4 km	MPC · JPL
642613	2005 TS_{147}	—	October 8, 2005	Kitt Peak	Spacewatch	·	1.4 km	MPC · JPL
642614	2005 TE_{148}	—	September 29, 2005	Kitt Peak	Spacewatch	·	1.6 km	MPC · JPL
642615	2005 TG_{149}	—	September 17, 1998	Kitt Peak	Spacewatch	·	810 m	MPC · JPL
642616	2005 TW_{149}	—	October 8, 2005	Kitt Peak	Spacewatch	·	1.1 km	MPC · JPL
642617	2005 TE_{153}	—	September 26, 2005	Kitt Peak	Spacewatch	·	1.5 km	MPC · JPL
642618	2005 TA_{154}	—	September 24, 2005	Kitt Peak	Spacewatch	·	770 m	MPC · JPL
642619	2005 TK_{154}	—	October 9, 2005	Kitt Peak	Spacewatch	·	590 m	MPC · JPL
642620	2005 TT_{154}	—	October 9, 2005	Kitt Peak	Spacewatch	·	3.3 km	MPC · JPL
642621	2005 TF_{156}	—	September 29, 2005	Kitt Peak	Spacewatch	NEM	1.5 km	MPC · JPL
642622	2005 TL_{158}	—	October 9, 2005	Kitt Peak	Spacewatch	·	1.4 km	MPC · JPL
642623	2005 TB_{165}	—	October 9, 2005	Kitt Peak	Spacewatch	·	1.2 km	MPC · JPL
642624	2005 TS_{175}	—	August 31, 2005	Palomar	NEAT	·	1.3 km	MPC · JPL
642625	2005 TL_{176}	—	October 1, 2005	Catalina	CSS	·	2.8 km	MPC · JPL
642626	2005 TP_{177}	—	August 27, 2005	Palomar	NEAT	THB	2.5 km	MPC · JPL
642627	2005 TR_{180}	—	August 31, 2005	Palomar	NEAT	·	750 m	MPC · JPL
642628	2005 TY_{180}	—	October 1, 2005	Catalina	CSS	·	1.7 km	MPC · JPL
642629	2005 TK_{181}	—	October 1, 2005	Kitt Peak	Spacewatch	·	750 m	MPC · JPL
642630	2005 TL_{181}	—	October 1, 2005	Kitt Peak	Spacewatch	·	1.3 km	MPC · JPL
642631	2005 TT_{182}	—	October 5, 2005	Catalina	CSS	JUN	950 m	MPC · JPL
642632	2005 TT_{183}	—	September 28, 2005	Palomar	NEAT	·	830 m	MPC · JPL
642633	2005 TO_{186}	—	October 11, 2005	Kitt Peak	Spacewatch	URS	3.1 km	MPC · JPL
642634	2005 TU_{187}	—	September 29, 2005	Kitt Peak	Spacewatch	·	710 m	MPC · JPL
642635	2005 TA_{191}	—	September 23, 2005	Kitt Peak	Spacewatch	·	940 m	MPC · JPL
642636	2005 TU_{193}	—	October 1, 2005	Kitt Peak	Spacewatch	PHO	620 m	MPC · JPL
642637	2005 TH_{195}	—	October 1, 2005	Mount Lemmon	Mount Lemmon Survey	·	1.2 km	MPC · JPL
642638	2005 TD_{198}	—	August 31, 2005	Kitt Peak	Spacewatch	NEM	1.8 km	MPC · JPL
642639	2005 TF_{199}	—	October 1, 2005	Mount Lemmon	Mount Lemmon Survey	·	690 m	MPC · JPL
642640	2005 TE_{200}	—	October 21, 2012	Haleakala	Pan-STARRS 1	·	680 m	MPC · JPL
642641	2005 TB_{201}	—	October 1, 2005	Kitt Peak	Spacewatch	·	3.0 km	MPC · JPL
642642	2005 TQ_{201}	—	October 8, 2012	Haleakala	Pan-STARRS 1	·	620 m	MPC · JPL
642643	2005 TR_{201}	—	January 25, 2007	Kitt Peak	Spacewatch	AGN	890 m	MPC · JPL
642644	2005 TZ_{201}	—	February 28, 2008	Mount Lemmon	Mount Lemmon Survey	MAR	820 m	MPC · JPL
642645	2005 TP_{202}	—	September 2, 2010	Mount Lemmon	Mount Lemmon Survey	·	2.2 km	MPC · JPL
642646	2005 TH_{203}	—	September 21, 2012	Mount Lemmon	Mount Lemmon Survey	·	600 m	MPC · JPL
642647	2005 TQ_{203}	—	October 13, 2005	Kitt Peak	Spacewatch	·	830 m	MPC · JPL
642648	2005 TA_{205}	—	September 25, 2012	Mount Lemmon	Mount Lemmon Survey	V	620 m	MPC · JPL
642649	2005 TM_{205}	—	October 23, 2016	Mount Lemmon	Mount Lemmon Survey	EOS	1.5 km	MPC · JPL
642650	2005 TS_{205}	—	December 1, 2010	Mount Lemmon	Mount Lemmon Survey	·	1.6 km	MPC · JPL
642651	2005 TT_{205}	—	October 5, 2005	Catalina	CSS	·	820 m	MPC · JPL
642652	2005 TE_{206}	—	June 15, 2015	Mount Lemmon	Mount Lemmon Survey	·	750 m	MPC · JPL
642653	2005 TF_{206}	—	November 21, 2014	Haleakala	Pan-STARRS 1	EUN	810 m	MPC · JPL
642654	2005 TN_{206}	—	October 6, 2012	Haleakala	Pan-STARRS 1	·	660 m	MPC · JPL
642655	2005 TV_{206}	—	October 4, 2005	Mount Lemmon	Mount Lemmon Survey	V	440 m	MPC · JPL
642656	2005 TK_{207}	—	September 12, 2016	Mount Lemmon	Mount Lemmon Survey	·	2.4 km	MPC · JPL
642657	2005 TO_{207}	—	February 5, 2016	Haleakala	Pan-STARRS 1	·	1.3 km	MPC · JPL
642658	2005 TM_{208}	—	October 12, 2005	Kitt Peak	Spacewatch	·	1.4 km	MPC · JPL
642659	2005 TX_{209}	—	September 24, 2005	Kitt Peak	Spacewatch	·	810 m	MPC · JPL
642660	2005 TJ_{214}	—	October 1, 2005	Kitt Peak	Spacewatch	·	3.0 km	MPC · JPL
642661	2005 TN_{214}	—	October 1, 2005	Mount Lemmon	Mount Lemmon Survey	·	1.1 km	MPC · JPL
642662	2005 TV_{217}	—	October 1, 2005	Mount Lemmon	Mount Lemmon Survey	·	1.5 km	MPC · JPL
642663	2005 TL_{218}	—	October 1, 2005	Kitt Peak	Spacewatch	·	1.2 km	MPC · JPL
642664	2005 TN_{222}	—	October 5, 2005	Mount Lemmon	Mount Lemmon Survey	·	2.4 km	MPC · JPL
642665	2005 TL_{223}	—	October 1, 2005	Kitt Peak	Spacewatch	·	2.5 km	MPC · JPL
642666	2005 TU_{223}	—	October 12, 2005	Kitt Peak	Spacewatch	·	1.0 km	MPC · JPL
642667	2005 TE_{224}	—	October 1, 2005	Mount Lemmon	Mount Lemmon Survey	·	1.2 km	MPC · JPL
642668	2005 TH_{225}	—	October 1, 2005	Mount Lemmon	Mount Lemmon Survey	·	1.5 km	MPC · JPL
642669	2005 TZ_{225}	—	October 12, 2005	Kitt Peak	Spacewatch	·	1.2 km	MPC · JPL
642670	2005 UN_{1}	—	October 20, 2005	Bakırtepe	D. Denisenko, M. Parmaksizoğlu	PHO	820 m	MPC · JPL
642671	2005 UC_{11}	—	October 22, 2005	Kitt Peak	Spacewatch	·	1.3 km	MPC · JPL
642672	2005 UY_{16}	—	October 1, 2005	Kitt Peak	Spacewatch	·	690 m	MPC · JPL
642673	2005 UE_{30}	—	October 5, 2005	Socorro	LINEAR	·	1.9 km	MPC · JPL
642674	2005 UC_{31}	—	October 24, 2005	Kitt Peak	Spacewatch	AEO	820 m	MPC · JPL
642675	2005 UR_{35}	—	October 24, 2005	Kitt Peak	Spacewatch	EUN	830 m	MPC · JPL
642676	2005 UN_{38}	—	October 24, 2005	Kitt Peak	Spacewatch	·	910 m	MPC · JPL
642677	2005 UQ_{40}	—	October 24, 2005	Kitt Peak	Spacewatch	·	770 m	MPC · JPL
642678	2005 UR_{43}	—	October 22, 2005	Kitt Peak	Spacewatch	·	740 m	MPC · JPL
642679	2005 UT_{44}	—	October 22, 2005	Kitt Peak	Spacewatch	·	690 m	MPC · JPL
642680	2005 UX_{48}	—	October 23, 2005	Catalina	CSS	(2076)	820 m	MPC · JPL
642681	2005 UC_{53}	—	October 23, 2005	Catalina	CSS	NYS	790 m	MPC · JPL
642682	2005 UR_{57}	—	October 24, 2005	Kitt Peak	Spacewatch	·	1.3 km	MPC · JPL
642683	2005 UR_{63}	—	October 25, 2005	Mount Lemmon	Mount Lemmon Survey	·	1.5 km	MPC · JPL
642684	2005 UE_{65}	—	September 3, 2005	Palomar	NEAT	TIR	3.5 km	MPC · JPL
642685	2005 UL_{75}	—	October 24, 2005	Palomar	NEAT	THB	2.1 km	MPC · JPL
642686	2005 UN_{75}	—	October 24, 2005	Palomar	NEAT	·	1.4 km	MPC · JPL
642687	2005 UV_{75}	—	October 24, 2005	Palomar	NEAT	EUN	1.1 km	MPC · JPL
642688	2005 UE_{76}	—	October 24, 2005	Palomar	NEAT	·	3.8 km	MPC · JPL
642689	2005 UB_{77}	—	October 24, 2005	Palomar	NEAT	·	1.7 km	MPC · JPL
642690	2005 UV_{79}	—	October 25, 2005	Mount Lemmon	Mount Lemmon Survey	V	520 m	MPC · JPL
642691	2005 UU_{83}	—	October 22, 2005	Kitt Peak	Spacewatch	·	810 m	MPC · JPL
642692	2005 UN_{86}	—	October 22, 2005	Kitt Peak	Spacewatch	·	1.2 km	MPC · JPL
642693	2005 UD_{89}	—	October 22, 2005	Kitt Peak	Spacewatch	·	2.6 km	MPC · JPL
642694	2005 UF_{89}	—	October 22, 2005	Kitt Peak	Spacewatch	·	780 m	MPC · JPL
642695	2005 UA_{90}	—	October 22, 2005	Kitt Peak	Spacewatch	WIT	790 m	MPC · JPL
642696	2005 UL_{96}	—	October 22, 2005	Kitt Peak	Spacewatch	·	1.4 km	MPC · JPL
642697	2005 UE_{102}	—	October 22, 2005	Kitt Peak	Spacewatch	(2076)	760 m	MPC · JPL
642698	2005 UH_{110}	—	October 22, 2005	Kitt Peak	Spacewatch	·	2.3 km	MPC · JPL
642699	2005 UM_{112}	—	October 22, 2005	Kitt Peak	Spacewatch	·	1.4 km	MPC · JPL
642700	2005 UO_{113}	—	October 22, 2005	Kitt Peak	Spacewatch	·	690 m	MPC · JPL

== 642701–642800 ==
back to top

Designation			Discovery			Properties		Ref
Permanent	Provisional	Named after	Date	Site	Discoverer(s)	Category	Diam.	Ref
642701	2005 UA_{116}	—	October 23, 2005	Kitt Peak	Spacewatch	·	2.2 km	MPC · JPL
642702	2005 UL_{116}	—	October 23, 2005	Kitt Peak	Spacewatch	·	780 m	MPC · JPL
642703	2005 UU_{122}	—	October 24, 2005	Kitt Peak	Spacewatch	·	900 m	MPC · JPL
642704	2005 UL_{123}	—	October 24, 2005	Kitt Peak	Spacewatch	·	1.2 km	MPC · JPL
642705	2005 UJ_{125}	—	October 24, 2005	Kitt Peak	Spacewatch	·	2.1 km	MPC · JPL
642706	2005 UC_{135}	—	October 25, 2005	Kitt Peak	Spacewatch	·	1.6 km	MPC · JPL
642707	2005 UZ_{137}	—	October 25, 2005	Mount Lemmon	Mount Lemmon Survey	·	2.1 km	MPC · JPL
642708	2005 UB_{145}	—	October 26, 2005	Kitt Peak	Spacewatch	·	800 m	MPC · JPL
642709	2005 UQ_{145}	—	October 26, 2005	Kitt Peak	Spacewatch	NYS	730 m	MPC · JPL
642710	2005 UV_{149}	—	October 26, 2005	Kitt Peak	Spacewatch	·	720 m	MPC · JPL
642711	2005 UA_{150}	—	September 30, 2005	Mount Lemmon	Mount Lemmon Survey	·	2.2 km	MPC · JPL
642712	2005 UT_{150}	—	October 26, 2005	Anderson Mesa	LONEOS	·	1.4 km	MPC · JPL
642713	2005 UM_{153}	—	October 26, 2005	Kitt Peak	Spacewatch	EUN	1 km	MPC · JPL
642714	2005 UK_{155}	—	September 3, 2005	Palomar	NEAT	·	1.4 km	MPC · JPL
642715	2005 UC_{164}	—	October 5, 2005	Kitt Peak	Spacewatch	·	870 m	MPC · JPL
642716	2005 UG_{164}	—	September 21, 2000	Kitt Peak	Deep Ecliptic Survey	·	1.3 km	MPC · JPL
642717	2005 UF_{165}	—	October 24, 2005	Kitt Peak	Spacewatch	·	1.2 km	MPC · JPL
642718	2005 US_{168}	—	October 24, 2005	Kitt Peak	Spacewatch	·	2.0 km	MPC · JPL
642719	2005 UZ_{170}	—	October 24, 2005	Kitt Peak	Spacewatch	·	1.5 km	MPC · JPL
642720	2005 UU_{174}	—	September 30, 2005	Mount Lemmon	Mount Lemmon Survey	·	2.9 km	MPC · JPL
642721	2005 UZ_{174}	—	October 24, 2005	Kitt Peak	Spacewatch	·	780 m	MPC · JPL
642722	2005 UG_{175}	—	October 24, 2005	Kitt Peak	Spacewatch	URS	3.3 km	MPC · JPL
642723	2005 UD_{180}	—	October 24, 2005	Kitt Peak	Spacewatch	·	1.5 km	MPC · JPL
642724	2005 UJ_{182}	—	October 24, 2005	Kitt Peak	Spacewatch	·	1.4 km	MPC · JPL
642725	2005 UX_{186}	—	October 26, 2005	Kitt Peak	Spacewatch	·	1.4 km	MPC · JPL
642726	2005 UU_{187}	—	October 27, 2005	Kitt Peak	Spacewatch	·	1.3 km	MPC · JPL
642727	2005 UP_{193}	—	October 1, 2005	Kitt Peak	Spacewatch	·	2.3 km	MPC · JPL
642728	2005 UC_{199}	—	October 25, 2005	Kitt Peak	Spacewatch	(5651)	2.7 km	MPC · JPL
642729	2005 UW_{204}	—	October 26, 2005	Kitt Peak	Spacewatch	·	1.3 km	MPC · JPL
642730	2005 UQ_{213}	—	October 1, 2005	Catalina	CSS	·	740 m	MPC · JPL
642731	2005 US_{214}	—	October 5, 2005	Catalina	CSS	JUN	1.1 km	MPC · JPL
642732	2005 UJ_{215}	—	October 28, 2005	Catalina	CSS	PHO	870 m	MPC · JPL
642733	2005 UG_{218}	—	October 25, 2005	Kitt Peak	Spacewatch	·	2.6 km	MPC · JPL
642734	2005 UU_{220}	—	October 25, 2005	Kitt Peak	Spacewatch	ADE	1.6 km	MPC · JPL
642735	2005 UO_{224}	—	October 25, 2005	Kitt Peak	Spacewatch	·	1.4 km	MPC · JPL
642736	2005 UZ_{225}	—	October 25, 2005	Kitt Peak	Spacewatch	·	1.7 km	MPC · JPL
642737	2005 UT_{228}	—	October 25, 2005	Kitt Peak	Spacewatch	·	1.1 km	MPC · JPL
642738	2005 UD_{229}	—	October 25, 2005	Kitt Peak	Spacewatch	MAS	470 m	MPC · JPL
642739	2005 UG_{232}	—	October 25, 2005	Mount Lemmon	Mount Lemmon Survey	NEM	1.5 km	MPC · JPL
642740	2005 UP_{232}	—	October 25, 2005	Mount Lemmon	Mount Lemmon Survey	·	1.4 km	MPC · JPL
642741	2005 UL_{237}	—	October 22, 2005	Kitt Peak	Spacewatch	·	880 m	MPC · JPL
642742	2005 UJ_{238}	—	October 25, 2005	Kitt Peak	Spacewatch	·	1.4 km	MPC · JPL
642743	2005 UP_{239}	—	October 25, 2005	Kitt Peak	Spacewatch	·	1.5 km	MPC · JPL
642744	2005 UF_{240}	—	October 25, 2005	Kitt Peak	Spacewatch	·	1.7 km	MPC · JPL
642745	2005 UD_{246}	—	October 22, 2005	Kitt Peak	Spacewatch	·	1.5 km	MPC · JPL
642746	2005 UT_{247}	—	October 28, 2005	Mount Lemmon	Mount Lemmon Survey	·	2.1 km	MPC · JPL
642747	2005 UK_{250}	—	October 23, 2005	Catalina	CSS	·	850 m	MPC · JPL
642748	2005 US_{250}	—	October 23, 2005	Catalina	CSS	·	2.3 km	MPC · JPL
642749	2005 UM_{253}	—	October 27, 2005	Kitt Peak	Spacewatch	·	1.5 km	MPC · JPL
642750	2005 UT_{254}	—	October 22, 2005	Kitt Peak	Spacewatch	EUN	1.1 km	MPC · JPL
642751	2005 UA_{257}	—	October 25, 2005	Kitt Peak	Spacewatch	·	2.7 km	MPC · JPL
642752	2005 UB_{258}	—	October 6, 2005	Mount Lemmon	Mount Lemmon Survey	·	1.2 km	MPC · JPL
642753	2005 UP_{258}	—	October 25, 2005	Kitt Peak	Spacewatch	WIT	820 m	MPC · JPL
642754	2005 UR_{262}	—	October 6, 2005	Kitt Peak	Spacewatch	·	630 m	MPC · JPL
642755	2005 UJ_{263}	—	October 27, 2005	Kitt Peak	Spacewatch	·	1.5 km	MPC · JPL
642756	2005 UV_{263}	—	October 27, 2005	Kitt Peak	Spacewatch	HYG	2.1 km	MPC · JPL
642757	2005 UX_{267}	—	October 27, 2005	Kitt Peak	Spacewatch	·	840 m	MPC · JPL
642758	2005 UD_{268}	—	October 7, 2005	Kitt Peak	Spacewatch	MAS	640 m	MPC · JPL
642759	2005 UH_{268}	—	August 31, 2005	Kitt Peak	Spacewatch	·	2.5 km	MPC · JPL
642760	2005 UA_{271}	—	October 28, 2005	Mount Lemmon	Mount Lemmon Survey	·	630 m	MPC · JPL
642761	2005 UA_{272}	—	October 28, 2005	Kitt Peak	Spacewatch	MAS	610 m	MPC · JPL
642762	2005 UR_{274}	—	August 30, 2005	Palomar	NEAT	·	2.0 km	MPC · JPL
642763	2005 UW_{275}	—	October 1, 2005	Mount Lemmon	Mount Lemmon Survey	·	1.3 km	MPC · JPL
642764	2005 UD_{280}	—	October 1, 2005	Mount Lemmon	Mount Lemmon Survey	·	1.3 km	MPC · JPL
642765	2005 UZ_{280}	—	October 25, 2005	Kitt Peak	Spacewatch	·	2.4 km	MPC · JPL
642766	2005 US_{281}	—	October 25, 2005	Kitt Peak	Spacewatch	·	620 m	MPC · JPL
642767	2005 UJ_{284}	—	October 26, 2005	Kitt Peak	Spacewatch	·	1.4 km	MPC · JPL
642768	2005 UA_{289}	—	October 26, 2005	Kitt Peak	Spacewatch	·	1.2 km	MPC · JPL
642769	2005 UR_{291}	—	October 26, 2005	Kitt Peak	Spacewatch	·	1.9 km	MPC · JPL
642770	2005 UV_{292}	—	October 26, 2005	Kitt Peak	Spacewatch	·	2.4 km	MPC · JPL
642771	2005 UM_{294}	—	October 26, 2005	Kitt Peak	Spacewatch	·	1.6 km	MPC · JPL
642772	2005 UC_{296}	—	October 26, 2005	Kitt Peak	Spacewatch	·	1.3 km	MPC · JPL
642773	2005 UE_{300}	—	October 26, 2005	Kitt Peak	Spacewatch	·	760 m	MPC · JPL
642774	2005 UD_{303}	—	October 26, 2005	Kitt Peak	Spacewatch	EUN	810 m	MPC · JPL
642775	2005 UV_{306}	—	October 27, 2005	Mount Lemmon	Mount Lemmon Survey	·	1.4 km	MPC · JPL
642776	2005 UR_{307}	—	October 27, 2005	Mount Lemmon	Mount Lemmon Survey	V	720 m	MPC · JPL
642777	2005 UY_{307}	—	October 27, 2005	Mount Lemmon	Mount Lemmon Survey	VER	2.8 km	MPC · JPL
642778	2005 UD_{309}	—	October 28, 2005	Mount Lemmon	Mount Lemmon Survey	·	1.4 km	MPC · JPL
642779	2005 UG_{309}	—	October 1, 2005	Mount Lemmon	Mount Lemmon Survey	·	450 m	MPC · JPL
642780	2005 UR_{313}	—	October 22, 2005	Palomar	NEAT	·	1.9 km	MPC · JPL
642781	2005 UY_{314}	—	October 24, 2005	Kitt Peak	Spacewatch	WIT	810 m	MPC · JPL
642782	2005 UN_{315}	—	October 25, 2005	Kitt Peak	Spacewatch	·	1.7 km	MPC · JPL
642783	2005 UO_{321}	—	October 27, 2005	Mount Lemmon	Mount Lemmon Survey	·	1.2 km	MPC · JPL
642784	2005 UV_{321}	—	October 27, 2005	Kitt Peak	Spacewatch	·	1.5 km	MPC · JPL
642785	2005 UY_{328}	—	October 28, 2005	Mount Lemmon	Mount Lemmon Survey	·	1.3 km	MPC · JPL
642786	2005 US_{330}	—	October 28, 2005	Kitt Peak	Spacewatch	·	1.4 km	MPC · JPL
642787	2005 US_{333}	—	October 29, 2005	Mount Lemmon	Mount Lemmon Survey	·	850 m	MPC · JPL
642788	2005 UF_{338}	—	October 1, 2005	Mount Lemmon	Mount Lemmon Survey	·	1.4 km	MPC · JPL
642789	2005 UK_{339}	—	October 31, 2005	Kitt Peak	Spacewatch	·	790 m	MPC · JPL
642790	2005 UW_{343}	—	October 29, 2005	Kitt Peak	Spacewatch	·	2.7 km	MPC · JPL
642791	2005 UB_{346}	—	October 30, 2005	Kitt Peak	Spacewatch	·	560 m	MPC · JPL
642792	2005 UD_{346}	—	October 30, 2005	Kitt Peak	Spacewatch	THM	2.0 km	MPC · JPL
642793	2005 UK_{347}	—	October 30, 2005	Kitt Peak	Spacewatch	·	750 m	MPC · JPL
642794	2005 UT_{347}	—	October 31, 2005	Kitt Peak	Spacewatch	·	1.6 km	MPC · JPL
642795	2005 UQ_{351}	—	September 29, 2005	Kitt Peak	Spacewatch	·	940 m	MPC · JPL
642796	2005 UL_{352}	—	September 30, 2005	Catalina	CSS	·	730 m	MPC · JPL
642797	2005 UG_{357}	—	October 31, 2005	Mount Lemmon	Mount Lemmon Survey	·	1.1 km	MPC · JPL
642798	2005 UL_{357}	—	September 13, 2005	Catalina	CSS	·	2.4 km	MPC · JPL
642799	2005 UF_{358}	—	September 30, 2005	Mount Lemmon	Mount Lemmon Survey	·	2.1 km	MPC · JPL
642800	2005 UD_{366}	—	October 27, 2005	Kitt Peak	Spacewatch	·	1.5 km	MPC · JPL

== 642801–642900 ==
back to top

Designation			Discovery			Properties		Ref
Permanent	Provisional	Named after	Date	Site	Discoverer(s)	Category	Diam.	Ref
642801	2005 UN_{369}	—	October 27, 2005	Kitt Peak	Spacewatch	·	1.3 km	MPC · JPL
642802	2005 UZ_{370}	—	October 27, 2005	Kitt Peak	Spacewatch	·	1.2 km	MPC · JPL
642803	2005 UE_{371}	—	October 27, 2005	Mount Lemmon	Mount Lemmon Survey	·	2.5 km	MPC · JPL
642804	2005 UT_{371}	—	October 27, 2005	Mount Lemmon	Mount Lemmon Survey	ADE	1.5 km	MPC · JPL
642805	2005 UP_{373}	—	October 27, 2005	Kitt Peak	Spacewatch	·	610 m	MPC · JPL
642806	2005 UW_{374}	—	October 27, 2005	Kitt Peak	Spacewatch	·	1.3 km	MPC · JPL
642807	2005 UP_{375}	—	October 27, 2005	Kitt Peak	Spacewatch	·	640 m	MPC · JPL
642808	2005 UC_{376}	—	October 27, 2005	Kitt Peak	Spacewatch	·	2.4 km	MPC · JPL
642809	2005 UJ_{376}	—	October 27, 2005	Kitt Peak	Spacewatch	·	1.5 km	MPC · JPL
642810	2005 UV_{378}	—	October 1, 2005	Kitt Peak	Spacewatch	·	730 m	MPC · JPL
642811	2005 UW_{385}	—	October 28, 2005	Mount Lemmon	Mount Lemmon Survey	THM	1.9 km	MPC · JPL
642812	2005 UR_{387}	—	October 30, 2005	Mount Lemmon	Mount Lemmon Survey	·	1.5 km	MPC · JPL
642813	2005 UH_{389}	—	October 11, 2005	Kitt Peak	Spacewatch	·	1.5 km	MPC · JPL
642814	2005 UX_{391}	—	October 30, 2005	Kitt Peak	Spacewatch	·	2.4 km	MPC · JPL
642815	2005 UJ_{394}	—	October 29, 2005	Catalina	CSS	·	620 m	MPC · JPL
642816	2005 UO_{394}	—	October 29, 2005	Catalina	CSS	·	1.5 km	MPC · JPL
642817	2005 UG_{400}	—	July 25, 2001	Haleakala	NEAT	NYS	950 m	MPC · JPL
642818	2005 UO_{401}	—	October 27, 2005	Kitt Peak	Spacewatch	EOS	1.5 km	MPC · JPL
642819	2005 UP_{401}	—	October 27, 2005	Kitt Peak	Spacewatch	·	1.1 km	MPC · JPL
642820	2005 UJ_{402}	—	October 1, 2005	Mount Lemmon	Mount Lemmon Survey	·	580 m	MPC · JPL
642821	2005 UL_{403}	—	October 29, 2005	Mount Lemmon	Mount Lemmon Survey	·	1.3 km	MPC · JPL
642822	2005 UC_{410}	—	October 31, 2005	Mount Lemmon	Mount Lemmon Survey	VER	2.3 km	MPC · JPL
642823	2005 UV_{415}	—	October 25, 2005	Kitt Peak	Spacewatch	·	3.0 km	MPC · JPL
642824	2005 UD_{418}	—	October 25, 2005	Kitt Peak	Spacewatch	·	1.3 km	MPC · JPL
642825	2005 UF_{419}	—	October 25, 2005	Kitt Peak	Spacewatch	ADE	1.6 km	MPC · JPL
642826	2005 UQ_{419}	—	October 25, 2005	Kitt Peak	Spacewatch	·	1.1 km	MPC · JPL
642827	2005 UN_{425}	—	October 28, 2005	Kitt Peak	Spacewatch	·	710 m	MPC · JPL
642828	2005 UH_{426}	—	October 24, 2005	Kitt Peak	Spacewatch	·	500 m	MPC · JPL
642829	2005 UM_{431}	—	October 28, 2005	Kitt Peak	Spacewatch	·	870 m	MPC · JPL
642830	2005 UL_{432}	—	October 28, 2005	Kitt Peak	Spacewatch	·	2.1 km	MPC · JPL
642831	2005 UG_{435}	—	October 1, 2005	Mount Lemmon	Mount Lemmon Survey	·	1.5 km	MPC · JPL
642832	2005 UQ_{441}	—	September 23, 2005	Catalina	CSS	·	960 m	MPC · JPL
642833	2005 UH_{444}	—	October 4, 2005	Catalina	CSS	·	2.0 km	MPC · JPL
642834	2005 UP_{450}	—	October 27, 2005	Mount Lemmon	Mount Lemmon Survey	·	600 m	MPC · JPL
642835	2005 UL_{456}	—	October 30, 2005	Anderson Mesa	LONEOS	·	1.5 km	MPC · JPL
642836	2005 UA_{458}	—	October 29, 2005	Kitt Peak	Spacewatch	·	2.4 km	MPC · JPL
642837	2005 UO_{458}	—	October 30, 2005	Mount Lemmon	Mount Lemmon Survey	·	1.4 km	MPC · JPL
642838	2005 UE_{460}	—	October 28, 2005	Mount Lemmon	Mount Lemmon Survey	·	1.2 km	MPC · JPL
642839	2005 UR_{461}	—	October 29, 2005	Mount Lemmon	Mount Lemmon Survey	·	1.2 km	MPC · JPL
642840	2005 UK_{462}	—	October 30, 2005	Kitt Peak	Spacewatch	·	1.4 km	MPC · JPL
642841	2005 UQ_{462}	—	October 30, 2005	Kitt Peak	Spacewatch	·	790 m	MPC · JPL
642842	2005 UX_{462}	—	October 30, 2005	Kitt Peak	Spacewatch	NYS	1.1 km	MPC · JPL
642843	2005 UE_{463}	—	October 30, 2005	Kitt Peak	Spacewatch	GEF	910 m	MPC · JPL
642844	2005 UH_{463}	—	October 30, 2005	Kitt Peak	Spacewatch	·	2.1 km	MPC · JPL
642845	2005 UU_{464}	—	October 30, 2005	Kitt Peak	Spacewatch	·	1.6 km	MPC · JPL
642846	2005 UM_{465}	—	October 30, 2005	Kitt Peak	Spacewatch	·	720 m	MPC · JPL
642847	2005 UN_{465}	—	October 30, 2005	Kitt Peak	Spacewatch	·	1.2 km	MPC · JPL
642848	2005 UJ_{467}	—	October 30, 2005	Kitt Peak	Spacewatch	NEM	1.8 km	MPC · JPL
642849	2005 UZ_{467}	—	October 30, 2005	Kitt Peak	Spacewatch	·	1.3 km	MPC · JPL
642850	2005 UM_{470}	—	October 30, 2005	Kitt Peak	Spacewatch	EUP	2.8 km	MPC · JPL
642851	2005 UR_{470}	—	October 30, 2005	Kitt Peak	Spacewatch	V	540 m	MPC · JPL
642852	2005 UX_{471}	—	October 26, 2005	Kitt Peak	Spacewatch	·	1.4 km	MPC · JPL
642853	2005 UO_{473}	—	October 31, 2005	Mount Lemmon	Mount Lemmon Survey	·	1.4 km	MPC · JPL
642854	2005 UN_{481}	—	October 30, 2005	Catalina	CSS	·	1.6 km	MPC · JPL
642855	2005 UK_{483}	—	October 10, 2005	Kitt Peak	Spacewatch	·	1.5 km	MPC · JPL
642856	2005 UT_{483}	—	October 1, 2005	Anderson Mesa	LONEOS	·	2.7 km	MPC · JPL
642857	2005 UR_{487}	—	September 3, 2005	Palomar	NEAT	·	1.4 km	MPC · JPL
642858	2005 UK_{494}	—	October 25, 2005	Catalina	CSS	·	1.8 km	MPC · JPL
642859	2005 UT_{495}	—	September 30, 2005	Catalina	CSS	·	740 m	MPC · JPL
642860	2005 UV_{495}	—	October 26, 2005	Anderson Mesa	LONEOS	·	1.0 km	MPC · JPL
642861	2005 UA_{496}	—	September 29, 2005	Catalina	CSS	·	2.1 km	MPC · JPL
642862	2005 UG_{497}	—	October 5, 2005	Catalina	CSS	·	1.5 km	MPC · JPL
642863	2005 UE_{520}	—	October 30, 2005	Apache Point	SDSS Collaboration	EUN	1 km	MPC · JPL
642864	2005 UH_{520}	—	October 30, 2005	Apache Point	SDSS Collaboration	·	1.5 km	MPC · JPL
642865	2005 UU_{521}	—	October 27, 2005	Apache Point	SDSS Collaboration	·	2.7 km	MPC · JPL
642866	2005 UA_{524}	—	October 25, 2005	Apache Point	SDSS Collaboration	·	2.5 km	MPC · JPL
642867	2005 UF_{526}	—	September 29, 2005	Mount Lemmon	Mount Lemmon Survey	NYS	780 m	MPC · JPL
642868	2005 UW_{528}	—	April 9, 2010	Mount Lemmon	Mount Lemmon Survey	V	650 m	MPC · JPL
642869	2005 UR_{531}	—	October 27, 2005	Kitt Peak	Spacewatch	AEO	840 m	MPC · JPL
642870	2005 UV_{532}	—	October 27, 2005	Kitt Peak	Spacewatch	·	1.4 km	MPC · JPL
642871	2005 UD_{533}	—	October 25, 2005	Mount Lemmon	Mount Lemmon Survey	·	1.1 km	MPC · JPL
642872	2005 UM_{533}	—	October 28, 2005	Mount Lemmon	Mount Lemmon Survey	·	760 m	MPC · JPL
642873	2005 UT_{533}	—	October 31, 2005	Mount Lemmon	Mount Lemmon Survey	PHO	870 m	MPC · JPL
642874	2005 UP_{534}	—	February 25, 2007	Kitt Peak	Spacewatch	MAS	820 m	MPC · JPL
642875	2005 UM_{535}	—	September 23, 2011	Haleakala	Pan-STARRS 1	ELF	2.4 km	MPC · JPL
642876	2005 US_{535}	—	October 31, 2005	Kitt Peak	Spacewatch	·	1.4 km	MPC · JPL
642877	2005 UC_{536}	—	October 10, 2016	Mount Lemmon	Mount Lemmon Survey	·	2.8 km	MPC · JPL
642878	2005 UK_{536}	—	October 25, 2011	Haleakala	Pan-STARRS 1	·	2.6 km	MPC · JPL
642879	2005 UN_{536}	—	September 2, 2014	Haleakala	Pan-STARRS 1	·	1.4 km	MPC · JPL
642880	2005 UO_{536}	—	April 23, 2014	Cerro Tololo	DECam	·	2.3 km	MPC · JPL
642881	2005 UT_{537}	—	October 30, 2005	Mount Lemmon	Mount Lemmon Survey	·	760 m	MPC · JPL
642882	2005 UC_{539}	—	April 4, 2008	Mount Lemmon	Mount Lemmon Survey	EOS	1.7 km	MPC · JPL
642883	2005 UK_{539}	—	October 28, 2016	Haleakala	Pan-STARRS 1	·	2.7 km	MPC · JPL
642884	2005 US_{539}	—	October 24, 2005	Mauna Kea	A. Boattini	·	2.4 km	MPC · JPL
642885	2005 UH_{540}	—	October 27, 2005	Kitt Peak	Spacewatch	·	2.0 km	MPC · JPL
642886	2005 US_{540}	—	October 21, 2012	Haleakala	Pan-STARRS 1	·	660 m	MPC · JPL
642887	2005 UT_{540}	—	July 28, 2013	Kitt Peak	Spacewatch	·	1.6 km	MPC · JPL
642888	2005 UW_{540}	—	October 24, 2005	Mauna Kea	A. Boattini	·	1.1 km	MPC · JPL
642889	2005 UC_{541}	—	October 25, 2005	Mount Lemmon	Mount Lemmon Survey	MRX	880 m	MPC · JPL
642890	2005 UJ_{541}	—	October 20, 2012	Kitt Peak	Spacewatch	·	660 m	MPC · JPL
642891	2005 UL_{541}	—	September 25, 2009	Mount Lemmon	Mount Lemmon Survey	·	1.3 km	MPC · JPL
642892	2005 UM_{541}	—	April 25, 2017	Haleakala	Pan-STARRS 1	H	400 m	MPC · JPL
642893	2005 UA_{542}	—	October 22, 2005	Kitt Peak	Spacewatch	·	1.4 km	MPC · JPL
642894	2005 UD_{542}	—	October 27, 2005	Mount Lemmon	Mount Lemmon Survey	·	1.1 km	MPC · JPL
642895	2005 UF_{542}	—	April 30, 2016	Haleakala	Pan-STARRS 1	EUN	900 m	MPC · JPL
642896	2005 UN_{542}	—	March 31, 2008	Kitt Peak	Spacewatch	·	2.4 km	MPC · JPL
642897	2005 US_{542}	—	October 27, 2005	Mount Lemmon	Mount Lemmon Survey	·	450 m	MPC · JPL
642898	2005 UL_{543}	—	October 27, 2005	Mount Lemmon	Mount Lemmon Survey	·	2.4 km	MPC · JPL
642899	2005 UM_{543}	—	October 27, 2005	Mount Lemmon	Mount Lemmon Survey	·	2.6 km	MPC · JPL
642900	2005 UP_{543}	—	September 5, 2010	Mount Lemmon	Mount Lemmon Survey	VER	2.3 km	MPC · JPL

== 642901–643000 ==
back to top

Designation			Discovery			Properties		Ref
Permanent	Provisional	Named after	Date	Site	Discoverer(s)	Category	Diam.	Ref
642901	2005 UU_{543}	—	April 3, 2008	Mount Lemmon	Mount Lemmon Survey	·	2.2 km	MPC · JPL
642902	2005 UG_{544}	—	October 8, 2012	Kitt Peak	Spacewatch	·	780 m	MPC · JPL
642903	2005 UP_{544}	—	April 13, 2015	Haleakala	Pan-STARRS 1	URS	2.5 km	MPC · JPL
642904	2005 UX_{544}	—	August 17, 2009	Kitt Peak	Spacewatch	·	1.3 km	MPC · JPL
642905	2005 UE_{545}	—	June 18, 2015	Haleakala	Pan-STARRS 1	(31811)	2.5 km	MPC · JPL
642906	2005 UO_{545}	—	February 25, 2007	Kitt Peak	Spacewatch	V	540 m	MPC · JPL
642907	2005 UR_{545}	—	January 6, 2010	Kitt Peak	Spacewatch	·	630 m	MPC · JPL
642908	2005 US_{545}	—	October 28, 2005	Mount Lemmon	Mount Lemmon Survey	·	540 m	MPC · JPL
642909	2005 UU_{545}	—	January 11, 2010	Kitt Peak	Spacewatch	·	570 m	MPC · JPL
642910	2005 UV_{545}	—	December 21, 2006	Kitt Peak	Spacewatch	VER	2.6 km	MPC · JPL
642911	2005 UC_{546}	—	April 6, 2008	Mount Lemmon	Mount Lemmon Survey	·	2.5 km	MPC · JPL
642912	2005 UD_{546}	—	July 27, 2015	Haleakala	Pan-STARRS 1	·	830 m	MPC · JPL
642913	2005 UF_{547}	—	October 25, 2005	Mount Lemmon	Mount Lemmon Survey	·	1.2 km	MPC · JPL
642914	2005 UW_{547}	—	October 27, 2005	Kitt Peak	Spacewatch	·	2.5 km	MPC · JPL
642915	2005 UB_{549}	—	October 27, 2005	Kitt Peak	Spacewatch	·	1.2 km	MPC · JPL
642916	2005 UN_{549}	—	October 29, 2005	Kitt Peak	Spacewatch	·	2.4 km	MPC · JPL
642917	2005 UL_{550}	—	October 24, 2005	Kitt Peak	Spacewatch	·	1.2 km	MPC · JPL
642918	2005 UQ_{551}	—	October 22, 2005	Kitt Peak	Spacewatch	·	2.3 km	MPC · JPL
642919	2005 UG_{552}	—	October 27, 2005	Kitt Peak	Spacewatch	·	1.4 km	MPC · JPL
642920	2005 UL_{552}	—	March 11, 2007	Mount Lemmon	Mount Lemmon Survey	·	610 m	MPC · JPL
642921	2005 UT_{553}	—	October 27, 2005	Mount Lemmon	Mount Lemmon Survey	·	2.1 km	MPC · JPL
642922	2005 VR_{11}	—	November 3, 2005	Kitt Peak	Spacewatch	·	1.2 km	MPC · JPL
642923	2005 VF_{12}	—	October 27, 2005	Kitt Peak	Spacewatch	·	2.5 km	MPC · JPL
642924	2005 VN_{13}	—	September 30, 2005	Mount Lemmon	Mount Lemmon Survey	EUN	1.4 km	MPC · JPL
642925	2005 VN_{18}	—	November 1, 2005	Kitt Peak	Spacewatch	·	540 m	MPC · JPL
642926	2005 VM_{20}	—	November 1, 2005	Kitt Peak	Spacewatch	·	1.2 km	MPC · JPL
642927	2005 VR_{20}	—	November 1, 2005	Kitt Peak	Spacewatch	·	1.3 km	MPC · JPL
642928	2005 VP_{24}	—	October 25, 2005	Mount Lemmon	Mount Lemmon Survey	HNS	960 m	MPC · JPL
642929	2005 VF_{31}	—	November 4, 2005	Kitt Peak	Spacewatch	·	1.4 km	MPC · JPL
642930	2005 VO_{35}	—	November 3, 2005	Mount Lemmon	Mount Lemmon Survey	·	640 m	MPC · JPL
642931	2005 VU_{35}	—	October 10, 2005	Kitt Peak	Spacewatch	·	1.2 km	MPC · JPL
642932	2005 VG_{36}	—	November 3, 2005	Mount Lemmon	Mount Lemmon Survey	3:2	4.4 km	MPC · JPL
642933	2005 VZ_{38}	—	November 3, 2005	Mount Lemmon	Mount Lemmon Survey	·	880 m	MPC · JPL
642934	2005 VX_{40}	—	June 17, 2004	Siding Spring	SSS	·	1.9 km	MPC · JPL
642935	2005 VX_{42}	—	November 4, 2005	Mount Lemmon	Mount Lemmon Survey	·	870 m	MPC · JPL
642936	2005 VF_{46}	—	November 4, 2005	Mount Lemmon	Mount Lemmon Survey	·	1.0 km	MPC · JPL
642937	2005 VJ_{48}	—	November 5, 2005	Mount Lemmon	Mount Lemmon Survey	·	590 m	MPC · JPL
642938	2005 VS_{48}	—	November 5, 2005	Mount Lemmon	Mount Lemmon Survey	·	1.1 km	MPC · JPL
642939	2005 VT_{50}	—	October 27, 2005	Palomar	NEAT	·	1.3 km	MPC · JPL
642940	2005 VJ_{52}	—	March 8, 2003	Palomar	NEAT	·	2.1 km	MPC · JPL
642941	2005 VM_{52}	—	October 26, 2005	Anderson Mesa	LONEOS	JUN	1.1 km	MPC · JPL
642942	2005 VV_{53}	—	November 2, 2005	Mount Lemmon	Mount Lemmon Survey	·	1.3 km	MPC · JPL
642943	2005 VZ_{59}	—	September 25, 2005	Kitt Peak	Spacewatch	·	1.0 km	MPC · JPL
642944	2005 VJ_{60}	—	November 5, 2005	Mount Lemmon	Mount Lemmon Survey	·	640 m	MPC · JPL
642945	2005 VD_{64}	—	October 22, 2005	Kitt Peak	Spacewatch	·	1.6 km	MPC · JPL
642946	2005 VJ_{66}	—	October 25, 2005	Kitt Peak	Spacewatch	·	2.2 km	MPC · JPL
642947	2005 VM_{69}	—	November 4, 2005	Mount Lemmon	Mount Lemmon Survey	(11882)	1.2 km	MPC · JPL
642948	2005 VC_{70}	—	November 4, 2005	Mount Lemmon	Mount Lemmon Survey	EUN	920 m	MPC · JPL
642949	2005 VG_{73}	—	November 6, 2005	Kitt Peak	Spacewatch	·	1.3 km	MPC · JPL
642950	2005 VJ_{75}	—	October 24, 2005	Kitt Peak	Spacewatch	NYS	750 m	MPC · JPL
642951	2005 VB_{80}	—	November 1, 2005	Kitt Peak	Spacewatch	·	860 m	MPC · JPL
642952	2005 VE_{81}	—	November 5, 2005	Kitt Peak	Spacewatch	·	1.5 km	MPC · JPL
642953	2005 VU_{84}	—	November 4, 2005	Kitt Peak	Spacewatch	·	2.6 km	MPC · JPL
642954	2005 VX_{84}	—	November 4, 2005	Kitt Peak	Spacewatch	·	1.3 km	MPC · JPL
642955	2005 VD_{85}	—	November 4, 2005	Mount Lemmon	Mount Lemmon Survey	·	2.7 km	MPC · JPL
642956	2005 VK_{85}	—	November 4, 2005	Mount Lemmon	Mount Lemmon Survey	·	1.5 km	MPC · JPL
642957	2005 VD_{89}	—	November 6, 2005	Kitt Peak	Spacewatch	PAD	1.2 km	MPC · JPL
642958	2005 VM_{89}	—	November 6, 2005	Kitt Peak	Spacewatch	·	890 m	MPC · JPL
642959	2005 VG_{90}	—	October 25, 2005	Kitt Peak	Spacewatch	·	2.7 km	MPC · JPL
642960	2005 VK_{90}	—	November 6, 2005	Kitt Peak	Spacewatch	·	1.3 km	MPC · JPL
642961	2005 VZ_{90}	—	November 6, 2005	Kitt Peak	Spacewatch	·	2.2 km	MPC · JPL
642962	2005 VM_{92}	—	October 29, 2005	Kitt Peak	Spacewatch	HYG	2.8 km	MPC · JPL
642963	2005 VB_{101}	—	October 24, 2005	Kitt Peak	Spacewatch	·	1.5 km	MPC · JPL
642964	2005 VP_{104}	—	November 3, 2005	Mount Lemmon	Mount Lemmon Survey	·	740 m	MPC · JPL
642965	2005 VJ_{107}	—	November 5, 2005	Kitt Peak	Spacewatch	·	650 m	MPC · JPL
642966	2005 VN_{107}	—	November 5, 2005	Kitt Peak	Spacewatch	·	1.4 km	MPC · JPL
642967	2005 VB_{115}	—	November 11, 2005	Kitt Peak	Spacewatch	·	2.4 km	MPC · JPL
642968	2005 VR_{116}	—	November 5, 2005	Kitt Peak	Spacewatch	·	1.3 km	MPC · JPL
642969	2005 VX_{129}	—	October 1, 2005	Kitt Peak	Spacewatch	T_{j} (2.98)	2.8 km	MPC · JPL
642970	2005 VY_{129}	—	October 30, 2005	Apache Point	SDSS Collaboration	·	1.3 km	MPC · JPL
642971	2005 VU_{133}	—	November 9, 2005	Apache Point	SDSS Collaboration	·	2.5 km	MPC · JPL
642972	2005 VV_{133}	—	October 30, 2005	Apache Point	SDSS Collaboration	·	2.9 km	MPC · JPL
642973	2005 VE_{138}	—	November 1, 2005	Mount Lemmon	Mount Lemmon Survey	·	630 m	MPC · JPL
642974	2005 VU_{138}	—	November 2, 2005	Mount Lemmon	Mount Lemmon Survey	·	2.8 km	MPC · JPL
642975	2005 VT_{139}	—	March 31, 2008	Kitt Peak	Spacewatch	·	2.5 km	MPC · JPL
642976	2005 VV_{139}	—	September 30, 2014	Mount Lemmon	Mount Lemmon Survey	EUN	1.0 km	MPC · JPL
642977	2005 VZ_{139}	—	May 8, 2014	Haleakala	Pan-STARRS 1	·	2.6 km	MPC · JPL
642978	2005 VA_{141}	—	November 2, 2005	Mount Lemmon	Mount Lemmon Survey	·	2.7 km	MPC · JPL
642979	2005 VB_{141}	—	July 9, 2013	Haleakala	Pan-STARRS 1	EUN	1.2 km	MPC · JPL
642980	2005 VH_{141}	—	October 20, 2012	Kitt Peak	Spacewatch	·	670 m	MPC · JPL
642981	2005 VF_{143}	—	August 14, 2015	Haleakala	Pan-STARRS 1	·	2.6 km	MPC · JPL
642982	2005 VL_{143}	—	November 2, 2005	Mount Lemmon	Mount Lemmon Survey	·	740 m	MPC · JPL
642983	2005 VO_{143}	—	November 6, 2005	Mount Lemmon	Mount Lemmon Survey	·	1.2 km	MPC · JPL
642984	2005 VQ_{143}	—	November 5, 2005	Kitt Peak	Spacewatch	·	1.3 km	MPC · JPL
642985	2005 VR_{143}	—	August 10, 2009	Kitt Peak	Spacewatch	·	1.4 km	MPC · JPL
642986	2005 VA_{144}	—	November 7, 2005	Mauna Kea	A. Boattini	·	980 m	MPC · JPL
642987	2005 VF_{144}	—	December 3, 2010	Mount Lemmon	Mount Lemmon Survey	·	1.4 km	MPC · JPL
642988	2005 VL_{144}	—	April 6, 2011	Kitt Peak	Spacewatch	V	590 m	MPC · JPL
642989	2005 VN_{144}	—	November 1, 2005	Mount Lemmon	Mount Lemmon Survey	V	600 m	MPC · JPL
642990	2005 VO_{144}	—	November 6, 2005	Kitt Peak	Spacewatch	·	1.4 km	MPC · JPL
642991	2005 VS_{144}	—	November 10, 2005	Kitt Peak	Spacewatch	·	1.5 km	MPC · JPL
642992	2005 VA_{145}	—	November 12, 2005	Kitt Peak	Spacewatch	·	660 m	MPC · JPL
642993	2005 VG_{145}	—	November 29, 2014	Mount Lemmon	Mount Lemmon Survey	EUN	880 m	MPC · JPL
642994	2005 VQ_{145}	—	August 11, 2015	Haleakala	Pan-STARRS 1	·	800 m	MPC · JPL
642995	2005 VR_{145}	—	October 24, 2011	Haleakala	Pan-STARRS 1	·	2.6 km	MPC · JPL
642996	2005 VX_{145}	—	February 22, 2007	Kitt Peak	Spacewatch	HYG	2.3 km	MPC · JPL
642997	2005 VR_{146}	—	November 1, 2005	Mount Lemmon	Mount Lemmon Survey	·	1.3 km	MPC · JPL
642998	2005 VG_{147}	—	April 29, 2008	Mount Lemmon	Mount Lemmon Survey	·	1.3 km	MPC · JPL
642999	2005 VT_{148}	—	March 13, 2008	Mount Lemmon	Mount Lemmon Survey	·	2.5 km	MPC · JPL
643000	2005 VQ_{149}	—	November 12, 2005	Kitt Peak	Spacewatch	·	1.6 km	MPC · JPL

back to top

== Meaning of names ==
As minor planet discoveries are confirmed, they are given a permanent number by the IAU's Minor Planet Center (MPC), and the discoverers can then submit names for them, following the IAU's naming conventions. The list below concerns those minor planets in the specified number-range that have received names, and explains the meanings of those names.

Official naming citations of newly named small Solar System bodies are approved and published in a bulletin by IAU's Working Group for Small Bodies Nomenclature (WGSBN). Before May 2021, citations were published in MPC's Minor Planet Circulars for many decades. Recent citations can also be found on the JPL Small-Body Database (SBDB). Until his death in 2016, German astronomer Lutz D. Schmadel compiled these citations into the Dictionary of Minor Planet Names (DMP) and regularly updated the collection.

Based on Paul Herget's The Names of the Minor Planets, Schmadel also researched the unclear origin of numerous asteroids, most of which had been named prior to World War II. This article incorporates text from this source, which is in the public domain: SBDB New namings may only be added to this list below after official publication as the preannouncement of names is condemned. The WGSBN publishes a comprehensive guideline for the naming rules of non-cometary small Solar System bodies.

Named minor planet	Provisional	This minor planet was named for...	Ref · Catalog
642097 Kusturica	2005 GA_{16}	Emir Kusturica, Serbian-French film director, screenwriter, actor, film producer and musician.	IAU · 642097
