= List of minor planets: 812001–813000 =

The following is a partial list of minor planets, running from minor-planet number 812001 through 813000, inclusive. The primary data for this and other partial lists is based on JPL's "Small-Body Orbital Elements" and data available from the Minor Planet Center. Critical list information is also provided by the MPC, unless otherwise specified from Lowell Observatory. A detailed description of the table's columns and additional sources are given on the main page including a complete list of every page in this series, and a statistical break-up on the dynamical classification of minor planets.

Also see the summary list of all named bodies in numerical and alphabetical order, and the corresponding naming citations for the number range of this particular list. New namings may only be added to this list after official publication, as the preannouncement of names is condemned by the Working Group for Small Bodies Nomenclature of the International Astronomical Union.

Near-Earth obj.	MBA (inner)	MBA (outer)	Centaur
Mars-crosser	MBA (middle)	Jupiter trojan	Trans-Neptunian obj.
Unclassified

== 812001–812100 ==
Designation			Discovery			Properties		Ref
Permanent	Provisional	Named after	Date	Site	Discoverer(s)	Category	Diam.	Ref
812001	2003 HV_{36}	—	April 29, 2003	Kitt Peak	Spacewatch	·	1.6 km	MPC · JPL
812002	2003 HW_{63}	—	April 26, 2003	Kitt Peak	Spacewatch	·	790 m	MPC · JPL
812003	2003 HF_{64}	—	April 8, 2014	Haleakala	Pan-STARRS 1	·	1.9 km	MPC · JPL
812004	2003 HG_{64}	—	May 7, 2014	Haleakala	Pan-STARRS 1	·	720 m	MPC · JPL
812005	2003 HA_{65}	—	April 19, 2007	Mount Lemmon	Mount Lemmon Survey	·	1.0 km	MPC · JPL
812006	2003 HK_{65}	—	November 30, 2005	Mount Lemmon	Mount Lemmon Survey	NYS	980 m	MPC · JPL
812007	2003 HG_{66}	—	April 26, 2003	Kitt Peak	Spacewatch	·	530 m	MPC · JPL
812008	2003 JP_{19}	—	July 1, 2014	Mount Lemmon	Mount Lemmon Survey	·	730 m	MPC · JPL
812009	2003 JQ_{19}	—	May 21, 2014	Haleakala	Pan-STARRS 1	·	700 m	MPC · JPL
812010	2003 JA_{20}	—	April 11, 2003	Kitt Peak	Spacewatch	·	970 m	MPC · JPL
812011	2003 JH_{20}	—	February 22, 2014	Mount Lemmon	Mount Lemmon Survey	·	820 m	MPC · JPL
812012	2003 KS_{27}	—	May 31, 2003	Cerro Tololo	Deep Ecliptic Survey	·	850 m	MPC · JPL
812013	2003 KH_{38}	—	April 15, 2013	Haleakala	Pan-STARRS 1	·	550 m	MPC · JPL
812014	2003 KB_{40}	—	April 4, 2014	Haleakala	Pan-STARRS 1	·	870 m	MPC · JPL
812015	2003 LC_{10}	—	May 22, 2014	Mount Lemmon	Mount Lemmon Survey	NYS	800 m	MPC · JPL
812016	2003 LM_{10}	—	November 23, 2016	Mount Lemmon	Mount Lemmon Survey	·	520 m	MPC · JPL
812017	2003 LS_{10}	—	September 23, 2011	Haleakala	Pan-STARRS 1	·	880 m	MPC · JPL
812018	2003 LP_{11}	—	May 25, 2014	Haleakala	Pan-STARRS 1	H	420 m	MPC · JPL
812019	2003 MJ_{13}	—	December 14, 2015	Haleakala	Pan-STARRS 1	H	430 m	MPC · JPL
812020	2003 NC_{9}	—	July 6, 2003	Mauna Kea	K. J. Meech	·	960 m	MPC · JPL
812021	2003 OJ_{35}	—	December 8, 2012	Nogales	M. Schwartz, P. R. Holvorcem	·	1.0 km	MPC · JPL
812022	2003 PF_{3}	—	July 21, 2003	Campo Imperatore	CINEOS	·	1.0 km	MPC · JPL
812023	2003 PX_{12}	—	August 4, 2003	Kitt Peak	Spacewatch	·	1.1 km	MPC · JPL
812024	2003 QO_{10}	—	August 22, 2003	Kleť	J. Tichá, M. Tichý	·	1.9 km	MPC · JPL
812025	2003 QU_{118}	—	August 26, 2003	Cerro Tololo	Deep Ecliptic Survey	·	1.7 km	MPC · JPL
812026	2003 QE_{121}	—	August 18, 2003	Haleakala	NEAT	·	550 m	MPC · JPL
812027	2003 QO_{121}	—	October 22, 2011	Mount Lemmon	Mount Lemmon Survey	MAS	590 m	MPC · JPL
812028	2003 QW_{121}	—	August 14, 2012	Haleakala	Pan-STARRS 1	·	1.2 km	MPC · JPL
812029	2003 QW_{123}	—	November 30, 2008	Kitt Peak	Spacewatch	MAS	660 m	MPC · JPL
812030	2003 RB_{16}	—	August 25, 2003	Socorro	LINEAR	·	710 m	MPC · JPL
812031	2003 RC_{28}	—	July 6, 2014	Haleakala	Pan-STARRS 1	NYS	770 m	MPC · JPL
812032	2003 SZ_{9}	—	September 17, 2003	Kitt Peak	Spacewatch	·	850 m	MPC · JPL
812033	2003 SG_{28}	—	September 18, 2003	Palomar	NEAT	·	1.6 km	MPC · JPL
812034	2003 SQ_{35}	—	September 18, 2003	Campo Imperatore	CINEOS	H	330 m	MPC · JPL
812035	2003 SE_{54}	—	September 17, 2003	Kitt Peak	Spacewatch	·	1.6 km	MPC · JPL
812036	2003 SZ_{95}	—	September 19, 2003	Palomar	NEAT	·	770 m	MPC · JPL
812037	2003 SH_{102}	—	September 15, 2003	Palomar	NEAT	·	1.8 km	MPC · JPL
812038	2003 ST_{112}	—	July 23, 2003	Palomar	NEAT	·	940 m	MPC · JPL
812039	2003 SN_{123}	—	September 18, 2003	Palomar	NEAT	·	470 m	MPC · JPL
812040	2003 SG_{172}	—	September 18, 2003	Palomar	NEAT	·	1.0 km	MPC · JPL
812041	2003 SR_{178}	—	August 28, 2003	Socorro	LINEAR	·	530 m	MPC · JPL
812042	2003 SP_{191}	—	September 19, 2003	Kitt Peak	Spacewatch	·	1.4 km	MPC · JPL
812043	2003 SP_{240}	—	September 27, 2003	Kitt Peak	Spacewatch	·	820 m	MPC · JPL
812044	2003 SP_{243}	—	September 18, 2003	Kitt Peak	Spacewatch	·	820 m	MPC · JPL
812045	2003 SK_{262}	—	September 28, 2003	Socorro	LINEAR	·	2.3 km	MPC · JPL
812046	2003 SW_{268}	—	September 30, 2003	Kitt Peak	Spacewatch	·	1.2 km	MPC · JPL
812047	2003 ST_{273}	—	September 28, 2003	Kitt Peak	Spacewatch	·	1.1 km	MPC · JPL
812048	2003 SK_{280}	—	September 18, 2003	Kitt Peak	Spacewatch	·	550 m	MPC · JPL
812049	2003 SJ_{323}	—	September 16, 2003	Kitt Peak	Spacewatch	·	450 m	MPC · JPL
812050	2003 SG_{329}	—	September 22, 2003	Anderson Mesa	LONEOS	·	910 m	MPC · JPL
812051	2003 SU_{340}	—	September 16, 2003	Kitt Peak	Spacewatch	T_{j} (2.99) · EUP	2.4 km	MPC · JPL
812052	2003 SO_{358}	—	September 20, 2003	Kitt Peak	Spacewatch	(5)	830 m	MPC · JPL
812053	2003 SV_{363}	—	September 20, 2003	Kitt Peak	Spacewatch	·	480 m	MPC · JPL
812054	2003 SG_{391}	—	September 26, 2003	Sacramento Peak	SDSS	·	1.4 km	MPC · JPL
812055	2003 SJ_{396}	—	September 26, 2003	Sacramento Peak	SDSS	·	2.4 km	MPC · JPL
812056	2003 SV_{405}	—	September 27, 2003	Sacramento Peak	SDSS	·	1.3 km	MPC · JPL
812057	2003 SE_{407}	—	September 27, 2003	Sacramento Peak	SDSS	·	1.5 km	MPC · JPL
812058	2003 SX_{408}	—	September 28, 2003	Sacramento Peak	SDSS	SUL	1.4 km	MPC · JPL
812059	2003 SO_{435}	—	September 21, 2003	Kitt Peak	Spacewatch	·	630 m	MPC · JPL
812060	2003 SP_{440}	—	September 20, 2003	Kitt Peak	Spacewatch	V	490 m	MPC · JPL
812061	2003 SV_{442}	—	September 18, 2003	Palomar	NEAT	·	490 m	MPC · JPL
812062	2003 SF_{443}	—	September 30, 2003	Kitt Peak	Spacewatch	·	2.2 km	MPC · JPL
812063	2003 SM_{445}	—	September 29, 2003	Kitt Peak	Spacewatch	·	1.3 km	MPC · JPL
812064	2003 SM_{447}	—	October 14, 2010	Mount Lemmon	Mount Lemmon Survey	·	410 m	MPC · JPL
812065	2003 SR_{447}	—	September 29, 2003	Kitt Peak	Spacewatch	·	420 m	MPC · JPL
812066	2003 SW_{447}	—	September 27, 2003	Kitt Peak	Spacewatch	·	1.4 km	MPC · JPL
812067	2003 SP_{448}	—	January 28, 2015	Haleakala	Pan-STARRS 1	H	390 m	MPC · JPL
812068	2003 SX_{450}	—	August 14, 2006	Palomar	NEAT	·	510 m	MPC · JPL
812069	2003 SG_{451}	—	July 4, 2016	Haleakala	Pan-STARRS 1	·	480 m	MPC · JPL
812070	2003 SK_{451}	—	September 16, 2003	Kitt Peak	Spacewatch	NYS	830 m	MPC · JPL
812071	2003 SN_{452}	—	September 22, 2003	Kitt Peak	Spacewatch	·	560 m	MPC · JPL
812072	2003 ST_{452}	—	May 12, 2012	Mount Lemmon	Mount Lemmon Survey	·	550 m	MPC · JPL
812073	2003 SG_{453}	—	September 28, 2003	Kitt Peak	Spacewatch	·	450 m	MPC · JPL
812074	2003 SA_{454}	—	September 19, 2003	Kitt Peak	Spacewatch	·	540 m	MPC · JPL
812075	2003 SG_{454}	—	July 4, 2016	Haleakala	Pan-STARRS 1	·	470 m	MPC · JPL
812076	2003 SN_{454}	—	September 22, 2003	Kitt Peak	Spacewatch	·	530 m	MPC · JPL
812077	2003 SC_{455}	—	September 19, 2003	Kitt Peak	Spacewatch	·	1.5 km	MPC · JPL
812078	2003 SU_{455}	—	September 30, 2003	Kitt Peak	Spacewatch	·	440 m	MPC · JPL
812079	2003 SC_{456}	—	September 16, 2003	Kitt Peak	Spacewatch	·	520 m	MPC · JPL
812080	2003 SY_{457}	—	November 2, 2013	Kitt Peak	Spacewatch	·	500 m	MPC · JPL
812081	2003 SH_{459}	—	September 19, 2014	Haleakala	Pan-STARRS 1	·	1.8 km	MPC · JPL
812082	2003 SM_{459}	—	October 20, 2007	Mount Lemmon	Mount Lemmon Survey	·	700 m	MPC · JPL
812083	2003 SU_{462}	—	September 22, 2003	Kitt Peak	Spacewatch	H	360 m	MPC · JPL
812084	2003 SJ_{465}	—	September 22, 2003	Kitt Peak	Spacewatch	·	1.4 km	MPC · JPL
812085	2003 SV_{465}	—	September 19, 2003	Anderson Mesa	LONEOS	·	910 m	MPC · JPL
812086	2003 SG_{468}	—	September 21, 2003	Kitt Peak	Spacewatch	·	2.3 km	MPC · JPL
812087	2003 SL_{469}	—	September 22, 2003	Kitt Peak	Spacewatch	·	800 m	MPC · JPL
812088	2003 SX_{469}	—	September 28, 2003	Kitt Peak	Spacewatch	MAR	770 m	MPC · JPL
812089	2003 SY_{469}	—	September 18, 2003	Kitt Peak	Spacewatch	·	990 m	MPC · JPL
812090	2003 SA_{471}	—	September 18, 2003	Kitt Peak	Spacewatch	V	530 m	MPC · JPL
812091	2003 SQ_{473}	—	September 22, 2003	Kitt Peak	Spacewatch	·	960 m	MPC · JPL
812092	2003 SX_{475}	—	September 19, 2003	Kitt Peak	Spacewatch	·	890 m	MPC · JPL
812093	2003 SV_{476}	—	September 29, 2003	Kitt Peak	Spacewatch	HOF	1.7 km	MPC · JPL
812094	2003 TW_{21}	—	October 1, 2003	Kitt Peak	Spacewatch	·	1.3 km	MPC · JPL
812095	2003 TE_{22}	—	September 25, 2003	Palomar	NEAT	·	1.6 km	MPC · JPL
812096	2003 TV_{22}	—	October 1, 2003	Kitt Peak	Spacewatch	·	2.5 km	MPC · JPL
812097	2003 TV_{54}	—	October 5, 2003	Kitt Peak	Spacewatch	LIX	2.1 km	MPC · JPL
812098	2003 UM_{2}	—	October 16, 2003	Kitt Peak	Spacewatch	PHO	610 m	MPC · JPL
812099	2003 UB_{8}	—	September 30, 2003	Kitt Peak	Spacewatch	H	330 m	MPC · JPL
812100	2003 UJ_{10}	—	October 18, 2003	Kitt Peak	Spacewatch	EUN	900 m	MPC · JPL

== 812101–812200 ==
back to top

Designation			Discovery			Properties		Ref
Permanent	Provisional	Named after	Date	Site	Discoverer(s)	Category	Diam.	Ref
812101	2003 UC_{16}	—	September 28, 2003	Socorro	LINEAR	·	1.1 km	MPC · JPL
812102	2003 UZ_{25}	—	October 22, 2003	Kitt Peak	Spacewatch	H	320 m	MPC · JPL
812103	2003 UQ_{42}	—	October 17, 2003	Kitt Peak	Spacewatch	H	330 m	MPC · JPL
812104	2003 UU_{70}	—	October 18, 2003	Kitt Peak	Spacewatch	NYS	720 m	MPC · JPL
812105	2003 UL_{116}	—	September 28, 2003	J-Six Ranchettes	W. K. Y. Yeung	·	530 m	MPC · JPL
812106	2003 UW_{125}	—	September 22, 2003	Palomar	NEAT	NYS	990 m	MPC · JPL
812107	2003 UV_{133}	—	September 19, 2003	Palomar	NEAT	·	1.1 km	MPC · JPL
812108	2003 UL_{139}	—	October 16, 2003	Palomar	NEAT	·	700 m	MPC · JPL
812109	2003 UQ_{155}	—	October 5, 2003	Kitt Peak	Spacewatch	·	550 m	MPC · JPL
812110	2003 UO_{232}	—	September 28, 2003	Kitt Peak	Spacewatch	·	440 m	MPC · JPL
812111	2003 UF_{289}	—	October 25, 2003	Kitt Peak	Spacewatch	·	970 m	MPC · JPL
812112	2003 UJ_{297}	—	September 22, 2003	Kitt Peak	Spacewatch	3:2	4.6 km	MPC · JPL
812113	2003 UA_{317}	—	September 18, 2003	Kitt Peak	Spacewatch	·	1.8 km	MPC · JPL
812114	2003 UJ_{321}	—	October 2, 2003	Kitt Peak	Spacewatch	·	1 km	MPC · JPL
812115	2003 UW_{322}	—	October 16, 2003	Kitt Peak	Spacewatch	·	1.1 km	MPC · JPL
812116	2003 UQ_{329}	—	September 30, 2003	Kitt Peak	Spacewatch	·	490 m	MPC · JPL
812117	2003 UV_{341}	—	August 23, 2003	Palomar	NEAT	·	2.0 km	MPC · JPL
812118	2003 UG_{343}	—	September 30, 2003	Kitt Peak	Spacewatch	·	2.1 km	MPC · JPL
812119	2003 UT_{343}	—	October 19, 2003	Kitt Peak	Spacewatch	·	500 m	MPC · JPL
812120	2003 UX_{361}	—	October 20, 2003	Kitt Peak	Spacewatch	·	1.4 km	MPC · JPL
812121	2003 UO_{362}	—	October 20, 2003	Kitt Peak	Spacewatch	·	870 m	MPC · JPL
812122	2003 UA_{372}	—	October 22, 2003	Sacramento Peak	SDSS	·	1.1 km	MPC · JPL
812123	2003 UY_{375}	—	September 19, 2003	Kitt Peak	Spacewatch	·	830 m	MPC · JPL
812124	2003 UP_{383}	—	October 22, 2003	Sacramento Peak	SDSS	·	570 m	MPC · JPL
812125	2003 US_{386}	—	October 20, 2003	Palomar	NEAT	·	410 m	MPC · JPL
812126	2003 UB_{391}	—	October 22, 2003	Sacramento Peak	SDSS	·	550 m	MPC · JPL
812127	2003 UC_{394}	—	October 22, 2003	Sacramento Peak	SDSS	·	2.2 km	MPC · JPL
812128	2003 UN_{397}	—	October 22, 2003	Sacramento Peak	SDSS	·	2.3 km	MPC · JPL
812129	2003 UU_{408}	—	October 23, 2003	Sacramento Peak	SDSS	·	2.4 km	MPC · JPL
812130	2003 UY_{426}	—	October 23, 2003	Kitt Peak	Spacewatch	·	1.3 km	MPC · JPL
812131	2003 UU_{427}	—	November 16, 2003	Kitt Peak	Spacewatch	·	530 m	MPC · JPL
812132	2003 UG_{428}	—	October 5, 1996	Kitt Peak	Spacewatch	·	560 m	MPC · JPL
812133	2003 UQ_{429}	—	April 20, 2012	Kitt Peak	Spacewatch	·	520 m	MPC · JPL
812134	2003 US_{429}	—	October 8, 2012	Mount Lemmon	Mount Lemmon Survey	·	1.2 km	MPC · JPL
812135	2003 UH_{430}	—	March 8, 2013	Haleakala	Pan-STARRS 1	·	810 m	MPC · JPL
812136	2003 UF_{431}	—	October 21, 2003	Kitt Peak	Spacewatch	·	480 m	MPC · JPL
812137	2003 UO_{431}	—	October 27, 2003	Kitt Peak	Spacewatch	H	330 m	MPC · JPL
812138	2003 US_{435}	—	February 21, 2012	Kitt Peak	Spacewatch	·	690 m	MPC · JPL
812139	2003 UD_{436}	—	August 1, 2014	Haleakala	Pan-STARRS 1	·	860 m	MPC · JPL
812140	2003 UY_{436}	—	October 30, 2007	Kitt Peak	Spacewatch	·	960 m	MPC · JPL
812141	2003 UE_{443}	—	April 2, 2016	Haleakala	Pan-STARRS 1	·	750 m	MPC · JPL
812142	2003 UT_{444}	—	October 20, 2003	Kitt Peak	Spacewatch	H	370 m	MPC · JPL
812143	2003 UB_{446}	—	October 16, 2003	Kitt Peak	Spacewatch	EUN	810 m	MPC · JPL
812144	2003 UD_{446}	—	October 25, 2003	Kitt Peak	Spacewatch	·	1.4 km	MPC · JPL
812145	2003 UK_{446}	—	October 16, 2003	Kitt Peak	Spacewatch	·	480 m	MPC · JPL
812146	2003 VX_{12}	—	November 26, 2013	Mount Lemmon	Mount Lemmon Survey	·	450 m	MPC · JPL
812147	2003 VF_{13}	—	July 12, 2018	Haleakala	Pan-STARRS 1	·	1.5 km	MPC · JPL
812148	2003 VK_{13}	—	November 1, 2010	Mount Lemmon	Mount Lemmon Survey	·	460 m	MPC · JPL
812149	2003 WD_{23}	—	November 18, 2003	Kitt Peak	Spacewatch	·	1.1 km	MPC · JPL
812150	2003 WM_{38}	—	October 19, 2003	Palomar	NEAT	·	1.3 km	MPC · JPL
812151	2003 WM_{47}	—	November 18, 2003	Kitt Peak	Spacewatch	·	1.1 km	MPC · JPL
812152	2003 WB_{53}	—	November 20, 2003	Kitt Peak	Spacewatch	·	920 m	MPC · JPL
812153	2003 WX_{53}	—	October 25, 2003	Kitt Peak	Spacewatch	·	460 m	MPC · JPL
812154	2003 WL_{85}	—	November 20, 2003	Kitt Peak	Spacewatch	·	580 m	MPC · JPL
812155	2003 WZ_{105}	—	November 21, 2003	Kitt Peak	Spacewatch	·	700 m	MPC · JPL
812156	2003 WP_{158}	—	November 15, 2003	Kitt Peak	Spacewatch	·	2.2 km	MPC · JPL
812157	2003 WT_{163}	—	November 30, 2003	Kitt Peak	Spacewatch	THM	1.8 km	MPC · JPL
812158	2003 WE_{168}	—	November 19, 2003	Anderson Mesa	LONEOS	H	450 m	MPC · JPL
812159	2003 WZ_{180}	—	November 20, 2003	Kitt Peak	Deep Ecliptic Survey	·	910 m	MPC · JPL
812160	2003 WM_{194}	—	August 18, 2017	Haleakala	Pan-STARRS 1	·	830 m	MPC · JPL
812161	2003 WT_{199}	—	November 20, 2003	Kitt Peak	Spacewatch	V	380 m	MPC · JPL
812162	2003 WE_{201}	—	November 20, 2003	Kitt Peak	Deep Ecliptic Survey	·	530 m	MPC · JPL
812163	2003 WF_{201}	—	October 21, 2012	Kitt Peak	Spacewatch	·	1.1 km	MPC · JPL
812164	2003 WJ_{201}	—	May 9, 2014	Haleakala	Pan-STARRS 1	AEO	890 m	MPC · JPL
812165	2003 WK_{201}	—	November 19, 2003	Kitt Peak	Spacewatch	·	510 m	MPC · JPL
812166	2003 WC_{203}	—	October 9, 2010	Dauban	C. Rinner, Kugel, F.	·	500 m	MPC · JPL
812167	2003 WM_{203}	—	November 30, 2003	Kitt Peak	Spacewatch	·	490 m	MPC · JPL
812168	2003 WX_{203}	—	February 14, 2013	Mount Lemmon	Mount Lemmon Survey	·	940 m	MPC · JPL
812169	2003 WL_{204}	—	July 13, 2013	Mount Lemmon	Mount Lemmon Survey	·	500 m	MPC · JPL
812170	2003 WQ_{204}	—	November 30, 2003	Kitt Peak	Spacewatch	·	460 m	MPC · JPL
812171	2003 WB_{207}	—	March 7, 2017	Haleakala	Pan-STARRS 1	·	2.3 km	MPC · JPL
812172	2003 WU_{207}	—	September 14, 2006	Catalina	CSS	·	520 m	MPC · JPL
812173	2003 WB_{209}	—	April 5, 2016	Haleakala	Pan-STARRS 1	T_{j} (2.99) · 3:2	4.4 km	MPC · JPL
812174	2003 WK_{209}	—	December 13, 2010	Mount Lemmon	Mount Lemmon Survey	·	540 m	MPC · JPL
812175	2003 WU_{209}	—	January 1, 2016	Mount Lemmon	Mount Lemmon Survey	·	2.6 km	MPC · JPL
812176	2003 WY_{209}	—	August 27, 2016	Haleakala	Pan-STARRS 1	·	1.5 km	MPC · JPL
812177	2003 WC_{211}	—	February 28, 2008	Kitt Peak	Spacewatch	·	490 m	MPC · JPL
812178	2003 WR_{212}	—	May 11, 2015	Mount Lemmon	Mount Lemmon Survey	·	480 m	MPC · JPL
812179	2003 WQ_{213}	—	October 1, 2011	Kitt Peak	Spacewatch	·	670 m	MPC · JPL
812180	2003 WK_{216}	—	November 26, 2003	Kitt Peak	Spacewatch	HNS	990 m	MPC · JPL
812181	2003 XY_{40}	—	December 14, 2003	Kitt Peak	Spacewatch	·	1.8 km	MPC · JPL
812182	2003 XA_{45}	—	January 13, 2011	Mount Lemmon	Mount Lemmon Survey	·	480 m	MPC · JPL
812183	2003 XR_{45}	—	July 29, 2014	Haleakala	Pan-STARRS 1	·	870 m	MPC · JPL
812184	2003 XS_{46}	—	December 14, 2003	Kitt Peak	Spacewatch	H	360 m	MPC · JPL
812185	2003 YE_{118}	—	December 27, 2003	Socorro	LINEAR	·	1.1 km	MPC · JPL
812186	2003 YZ_{185}	—	September 16, 2010	Kitt Peak	Spacewatch	NYS	770 m	MPC · JPL
812187	2003 YL_{186}	—	September 11, 2010	Mount Lemmon	Mount Lemmon Survey	·	980 m	MPC · JPL
812188	2003 YN_{190}	—	December 29, 2003	Kitt Peak	Spacewatch	·	600 m	MPC · JPL
812189	2003 YS_{190}	—	December 21, 2003	Kitt Peak	Spacewatch	H	360 m	MPC · JPL
812190	2004 AL_{13}	—	January 13, 2004	Kitt Peak	Spacewatch	·	540 m	MPC · JPL
812191	2004 AV_{15}	—	January 15, 2004	Kitt Peak	Spacewatch	·	490 m	MPC · JPL
812192	2004 BS_{18}	—	January 18, 2004	Kitt Peak	Spacewatch	·	600 m	MPC · JPL
812193	2004 BO_{132}	—	January 17, 2004	Kitt Peak	Spacewatch	T_{j} (2.99) · (895)	2.7 km	MPC · JPL
812194	2004 BU_{140}	—	January 19, 2004	Kitt Peak	Spacewatch	·	2.0 km	MPC · JPL
812195	2004 BB_{141}	—	January 19, 2004	Kitt Peak	Spacewatch	·	1.7 km	MPC · JPL
812196	2004 BV_{166}	—	May 13, 2015	Kitt Peak	Spacewatch	H	410 m	MPC · JPL
812197	2004 BJ_{167}	—	December 17, 2007	Mount Lemmon	Mount Lemmon Survey	(5)	700 m	MPC · JPL
812198	2004 BC_{168}	—	January 16, 2004	Kitt Peak	Spacewatch	·	500 m	MPC · JPL
812199	2004 BC_{174}	—	January 28, 2004	Kitt Peak	Spacewatch	NYS	590 m	MPC · JPL
812200	2004 CM_{24}	—	January 30, 2004	Kitt Peak	Spacewatch	·	550 m	MPC · JPL

== 812201–812300 ==
back to top

Designation			Discovery			Properties		Ref
Permanent	Provisional	Named after	Date	Site	Discoverer(s)	Category	Diam.	Ref
812201	2004 CV_{49}	—	January 30, 2004	Socorro	LINEAR	PHO	1.0 km	MPC · JPL
812202	2004 CM_{132}	—	September 28, 2006	Mount Lemmon	Mount Lemmon Survey	NYS	590 m	MPC · JPL
812203	2004 CC_{135}	—	February 28, 2008	Kitt Peak	Spacewatch	MAS	590 m	MPC · JPL
812204	2004 CL_{135}	—	March 14, 2011	Mount Lemmon	Mount Lemmon Survey	·	610 m	MPC · JPL
812205	2004 CG_{136}	—	February 14, 2004	Kitt Peak	Spacewatch	·	580 m	MPC · JPL
812206	2004 DH_{1}	—	February 18, 2004	Calar Alto	F. Hormuth	·	800 m	MPC · JPL
812207	2004 DM_{2}	—	February 16, 2004	Kitt Peak	Spacewatch	·	750 m	MPC · JPL
812208	2004 DM_{53}	—	February 23, 2004	Bergisch Gladbach	W. Bickel	·	550 m	MPC · JPL
812209	2004 DN_{79}	—	January 17, 2004	Palomar	NEAT	H	500 m	MPC · JPL
812210	2004 DL_{82}	—	April 26, 2008	Mount Lemmon	Mount Lemmon Survey	NYS	760 m	MPC · JPL
812211	2004 DZ_{83}	—	August 31, 2013	Haleakala	Pan-STARRS 1	EUP	2.4 km	MPC · JPL
812212	2004 DG_{84}	—	April 26, 2008	Mount Lemmon	Mount Lemmon Survey	·	740 m	MPC · JPL
812213	2004 DJ_{84}	—	February 11, 2011	Mount Lemmon	Mount Lemmon Survey	·	570 m	MPC · JPL
812214	2004 DB_{86}	—	January 27, 2011	Kitt Peak	Spacewatch	·	700 m	MPC · JPL
812215	2004 DK_{86}	—	November 26, 2014	Haleakala	Pan-STARRS 1	·	780 m	MPC · JPL
812216	2004 EB_{117}	—	May 3, 2008	Mount Lemmon	Mount Lemmon Survey	·	770 m	MPC · JPL
812217	2004 EZ_{117}	—	March 15, 2004	Kitt Peak	Spacewatch	·	720 m	MPC · JPL
812218	2004 FE_{37}	—	February 26, 2004	Kitt Peak	Deep Ecliptic Survey	·	860 m	MPC · JPL
812219	2004 FT_{145}	—	March 30, 2004	Kitt Peak	Spacewatch	PHO	760 m	MPC · JPL
812220	2004 FU_{168}	—	January 16, 2011	Mount Lemmon	Mount Lemmon Survey	·	640 m	MPC · JPL
812221	2004 FJ_{171}	—	March 13, 2011	Kitt Peak	Spacewatch	·	550 m	MPC · JPL
812222	2004 FM_{171}	—	January 28, 2011	Kitt Peak	Spacewatch	·	610 m	MPC · JPL
812223	2004 FB_{172}	—	January 10, 2011	Mount Lemmon	Mount Lemmon Survey	·	740 m	MPC · JPL
812224	2004 FG_{175}	—	May 18, 2015	Mount Lemmon	Mount Lemmon Survey	·	700 m	MPC · JPL
812225	2004 GU_{2}	—	April 12, 2004	Socorro	LINEAR	·	1.2 km	MPC · JPL
812226	2004 GK_{4}	—	March 23, 2004	Kitt Peak	Spacewatch	·	880 m	MPC · JPL
812227	2004 GJ_{9}	—	April 12, 2004	Kitt Peak	Spacewatch	·	500 m	MPC · JPL
812228	2004 GW_{66}	—	April 13, 2004	Kitt Peak	Spacewatch	·	1.2 km	MPC · JPL
812229	2004 GT_{85}	—	March 16, 2004	Kitt Peak	Spacewatch	·	1.3 km	MPC · JPL
812230	2004 GQ_{90}	—	March 29, 2011	Mount Lemmon	Mount Lemmon Survey	·	820 m	MPC · JPL
812231	2004 GV_{91}	—	May 8, 2008	Mount Lemmon	Mount Lemmon Survey	MAS	450 m	MPC · JPL
812232	2004 GF_{92}	—	January 19, 2012	Kitt Peak	Spacewatch	(5)	880 m	MPC · JPL
812233	2004 HT_{15}	—	April 16, 2004	Kitt Peak	Spacewatch	·	690 m	MPC · JPL
812234	2004 HV_{18}	—	April 15, 2004	Anderson Mesa	LONEOS	·	780 m	MPC · JPL
812235	2004 HV_{84}	—	April 5, 2011	Kitt Peak	Spacewatch	·	700 m	MPC · JPL
812236	2004 JK_{13}	—	May 13, 2004	Palomar	NEAT	·	2.1 km	MPC · JPL
812237	2004 JM_{57}	—	February 18, 2010	Mount Lemmon	Mount Lemmon Survey	·	650 m	MPC · JPL
812238	2004 JO_{58}	—	August 7, 2008	Kitt Peak	Spacewatch	·	450 m	MPC · JPL
812239	2004 KD_{11}	—	May 19, 2004	Kitt Peak	Spacewatch	·	870 m	MPC · JPL
812240	2004 KZ_{20}	—	March 4, 2011	Bergisch Gladbach	W. Bickel	MAS	460 m	MPC · JPL
812241	2004 KN_{21}	—	December 29, 2014	Haleakala	Pan-STARRS 1	·	1.3 km	MPC · JPL
812242	2004 KS_{21}	—	May 19, 2004	Kitt Peak	Spacewatch	PHO	630 m	MPC · JPL
812243	2004 KC_{22}	—	June 25, 2015	Haleakala	Pan-STARRS 1	(2076)	710 m	MPC · JPL
812244	2004 LA	—	June 3, 2004	Palomar	NEAT	T_{j} (2.99) · EUP	2.9 km	MPC · JPL
812245	2004 LN_{15}	—	June 11, 2004	Palomar	NEAT	·	790 m	MPC · JPL
812246	2004 LA_{21}	—	June 12, 2004	Kitt Peak	Spacewatch	H	400 m	MPC · JPL
812247	2004 MJ_{1}	—	June 16, 2004	Kitt Peak	Spacewatch	·	1.3 km	MPC · JPL
812248	2004 MZ_{2}	—	June 20, 2004	Reedy Creek	J. Broughton	·	950 m	MPC · JPL
812249	2004 OR_{6}	—	July 16, 2004	Socorro	LINEAR	·	1.2 km	MPC · JPL
812250	2004 OR_{16}	—	January 8, 2011	Catalina	CSS	H	430 m	MPC · JPL
812251	2004 OV_{17}	—	July 16, 2004	Cerro Tololo	Deep Ecliptic Survey	·	700 m	MPC · JPL
812252	2004 PB_{10}	—	August 6, 2004	Campo Imperatore	CINEOS	·	850 m	MPC · JPL
812253	2004 PE_{24}	—	August 8, 2004	Socorro	LINEAR	NYS	630 m	MPC · JPL
812254	2004 PO_{41}	—	August 8, 2004	Socorro	LINEAR	·	820 m	MPC · JPL
812255	2004 PD_{54}	—	August 8, 2004	Anderson Mesa	LONEOS	(5)	1.0 km	MPC · JPL
812256	2004 PJ_{95}	—	August 12, 2004	Socorro	LINEAR	·	540 m	MPC · JPL
812257	2004 PF_{96}	—	August 11, 2004	Socorro	LINEAR	·	770 m	MPC · JPL
812258	2004 PT_{104}	—	August 15, 2004	Reedy Creek	J. Broughton	·	720 m	MPC · JPL
812259	2004 PX_{118}	—	November 24, 2011	Mount Lemmon	Mount Lemmon Survey	·	650 m	MPC · JPL
812260	2004 PD_{119}	—	August 14, 2004	Cerro Tololo	Deep Ecliptic Survey	ADE	1.4 km	MPC · JPL
812261	2004 PC_{121}	—	February 28, 2014	Haleakala	Pan-STARRS 1	MAS	590 m	MPC · JPL
812262	2004 PG_{121}	—	April 23, 2014	Mount Lemmon	Mount Lemmon Survey	·	1.8 km	MPC · JPL
812263	2004 PO_{121}	—	September 24, 2015	Mount Lemmon	Mount Lemmon Survey	·	700 m	MPC · JPL
812264	2004 PQ_{121}	—	January 11, 2011	Kitt Peak	Spacewatch	HNS	760 m	MPC · JPL
812265	2004 PM_{122}	—	August 13, 2004	Cerro Tololo	Deep Ecliptic Survey	·	2.0 km	MPC · JPL
812266	2004 PN_{122}	—	August 12, 2004	Cerro Tololo	Deep Ecliptic Survey	·	1.6 km	MPC · JPL
812267	2004 QX_{7}	—	August 23, 2004	Mitzpe Ramon	Israel, Spaceguard	·	1.2 km	MPC · JPL
812268	2004 QR_{13}	—	July 25, 2004	Anderson Mesa	LONEOS	·	840 m	MPC · JPL
812269	2004 QM_{15}	—	August 23, 2004	Kitt Peak	Spacewatch	·	460 m	MPC · JPL
812270	2004 QZ_{33}	—	April 30, 2014	Haleakala	Pan-STARRS 1	·	720 m	MPC · JPL
812271	2004 QF_{34}	—	February 22, 2017	Mount Lemmon	Mount Lemmon Survey	·	1.8 km	MPC · JPL
812272	2004 QN_{35}	—	February 20, 2014	Mount Lemmon	Mount Lemmon Survey	·	780 m	MPC · JPL
812273	2004 QY_{36}	—	August 22, 2004	Kitt Peak	Spacewatch	·	590 m	MPC · JPL
812274	2004 QK_{37}	—	August 20, 2004	Kitt Peak	Spacewatch	·	1.4 km	MPC · JPL
812275	2004 QA_{39}	—	August 25, 2004	Kitt Peak	Spacewatch	·	670 m	MPC · JPL
812276	2004 RL_{10}	—	September 7, 2004	Kitt Peak	Spacewatch	H	400 m	MPC · JPL
812277	2004 RV_{11}	—	September 7, 2004	Palomar	NEAT	·	1.0 km	MPC · JPL
812278	2004 RN_{25}	—	September 8, 2004	Socorro	LINEAR	H	380 m	MPC · JPL
812279	2004 RU_{38}	—	September 7, 2004	Kitt Peak	Spacewatch	MAS	520 m	MPC · JPL
812280	2004 RT_{62}	—	September 7, 2004	Tucson	R. A. Tucker	·	720 m	MPC · JPL
812281	2004 RZ_{69}	—	September 8, 2004	Socorro	LINEAR	·	990 m	MPC · JPL
812282	2004 RO_{73}	—	September 8, 2004	Socorro	LINEAR	·	780 m	MPC · JPL
812283	2004 RA_{85}	—	September 10, 2004	Socorro	LINEAR	·	950 m	MPC · JPL
812284	2004 RJ_{92}	—	September 8, 2004	Socorro	LINEAR	·	1.8 km	MPC · JPL
812285	2004 RL_{106}	—	September 8, 2004	Palomar	NEAT	·	1.6 km	MPC · JPL
812286	2004 RK_{107}	—	September 9, 2004	Socorro	LINEAR	·	960 m	MPC · JPL
812287	2004 RL_{117}	—	September 7, 2004	Kitt Peak	Spacewatch	·	520 m	MPC · JPL
812288	2004 RX_{127}	—	September 7, 2004	Kitt Peak	Spacewatch	·	2.5 km	MPC · JPL
812289	2004 RA_{139}	—	September 8, 2004	Palomar	NEAT	·	2.3 km	MPC · JPL
812290	2004 RC_{142}	—	August 22, 2004	Kitt Peak	Spacewatch	·	480 m	MPC · JPL
812291	2004 RP_{149}	—	September 9, 2004	Socorro	LINEAR	·	1.1 km	MPC · JPL
812292	2004 RJ_{161}	—	September 10, 2004	Kitt Peak	Spacewatch	·	910 m	MPC · JPL
812293	2004 RP_{162}	—	September 11, 2004	Socorro	LINEAR	·	440 m	MPC · JPL
812294	2004 RX_{174}	—	September 10, 2004	Socorro	LINEAR	·	1.1 km	MPC · JPL
812295	2004 RH_{245}	—	September 10, 2004	Kitt Peak	Spacewatch	MAS	580 m	MPC · JPL
812296	2004 RO_{245}	—	September 10, 2004	Kitt Peak	Spacewatch	·	750 m	MPC · JPL
812297	2004 RA_{280}	—	September 15, 2004	Kitt Peak	Spacewatch	·	700 m	MPC · JPL
812298	2004 RR_{284}	—	September 15, 2004	Kitt Peak	Spacewatch	·	990 m	MPC · JPL
812299	2004 RG_{303}	—	August 22, 2004	Kitt Peak	Spacewatch	·	1.9 km	MPC · JPL
812300	2004 RN_{308}	—	September 13, 2004	Socorro	LINEAR	·	1.5 km	MPC · JPL

== 812301–812400 ==
back to top

Designation			Discovery			Properties		Ref
Permanent	Provisional	Named after	Date	Site	Discoverer(s)	Category	Diam.	Ref
812301	2004 RL_{337}	—	September 15, 2004	Kitt Peak	Spacewatch	·	730 m	MPC · JPL
812302	2004 RX_{338}	—	September 17, 2004	Kitt Peak	Spacewatch	·	980 m	MPC · JPL
812303	2004 RL_{339}	—	September 15, 2004	Siding Spring	SSS	·	1.4 km	MPC · JPL
812304	2004 RX_{341}	—	September 14, 2004	Roque de los Muchachos	Nordic Near-Earth Object Network	EOS	1.6 km	MPC · JPL
812305	2004 RH_{343}	—	August 11, 2004	Socorro	LINEAR	·	690 m	MPC · JPL
812306	2004 RE_{348}	—	September 16, 2004	Kitt Peak	Spacewatch	·	1.5 km	MPC · JPL
812307	2004 RB_{354}	—	September 11, 2004	Kitt Peak	Spacewatch	·	660 m	MPC · JPL
812308	2004 RN_{354}	—	September 11, 2004	Kitt Peak	Spacewatch	·	420 m	MPC · JPL
812309	2004 RU_{357}	—	September 2, 2011	Haleakala	Pan-STARRS 1	PHO	720 m	MPC · JPL
812310	2004 RV_{357}	—	October 11, 2013	Nogales	M. Schwartz, P. R. Holvorcem	·	1.4 km	MPC · JPL
812311	2004 RF_{361}	—	September 11, 2004	Kitt Peak	Spacewatch	NYS	650 m	MPC · JPL
812312	2004 RH_{362}	—	June 3, 2011	Mount Lemmon	Mount Lemmon Survey	·	810 m	MPC · JPL
812313	2004 RP_{362}	—	September 11, 2004	Kitt Peak	Spacewatch	NYS	610 m	MPC · JPL
812314	2004 RU_{363}	—	September 9, 2004	Kitt Peak	Spacewatch	·	2.2 km	MPC · JPL
812315	2004 RX_{365}	—	September 12, 2004	Kitt Peak	Spacewatch	(5)	1.0 km	MPC · JPL
812316	2004 SW	—	September 16, 2004	Socorro	LINEAR	·	1.3 km	MPC · JPL
812317	2004 SQ_{36}	—	August 23, 2004	Kitt Peak	Spacewatch	·	610 m	MPC · JPL
812318	2004 SU_{37}	—	August 25, 2004	Kitt Peak	Spacewatch	·	1.1 km	MPC · JPL
812319	2004 SU_{63}	—	February 26, 2012	Mount Lemmon	Mount Lemmon Survey	·	2.5 km	MPC · JPL
812320	2004 SO_{64}	—	April 30, 2012	Kitt Peak	Spacewatch	·	1.3 km	MPC · JPL
812321	2004 SL_{66}	—	September 17, 2004	Kitt Peak	Spacewatch	·	660 m	MPC · JPL
812322	2004 SS_{66}	—	September 16, 2004	Kitt Peak	Spacewatch	·	680 m	MPC · JPL
812323	2004 TC_{17}	—	October 11, 2004	Palomar	NEAT	·	1.6 km	MPC · JPL
812324	2004 TB_{19}	—	October 12, 2004	Socorro	LINEAR	·	2.3 km	MPC · JPL
812325	2004 TF_{38}	—	October 4, 2004	Kitt Peak	Spacewatch	MIS	2.0 km	MPC · JPL
812326	2004 TN_{38}	—	September 9, 2004	Kitt Peak	Spacewatch	·	940 m	MPC · JPL
812327	2004 TK_{40}	—	September 24, 2004	Kitt Peak	Spacewatch	·	700 m	MPC · JPL
812328	2004 TS_{47}	—	October 4, 2004	Kitt Peak	Spacewatch	·	830 m	MPC · JPL
812329	2004 TH_{48}	—	October 4, 2004	Kitt Peak	Spacewatch	·	930 m	MPC · JPL
812330	2004 TY_{55}	—	October 4, 2004	Kitt Peak	Spacewatch	NYS	810 m	MPC · JPL
812331	2004 TW_{57}	—	October 5, 2004	Kitt Peak	Spacewatch	·	1.5 km	MPC · JPL
812332	2004 TV_{58}	—	October 5, 2004	Kitt Peak	Spacewatch	·	470 m	MPC · JPL
812333	2004 TB_{59}	—	October 5, 2004	Kitt Peak	Spacewatch	·	910 m	MPC · JPL
812334	2004 TX_{70}	—	October 6, 2004	Kitt Peak	Spacewatch	·	2.4 km	MPC · JPL
812335	2004 TX_{72}	—	October 6, 2004	Kitt Peak	Spacewatch	NYS	880 m	MPC · JPL
812336	2004 TP_{80}	—	October 5, 2004	Kitt Peak	Spacewatch	·	870 m	MPC · JPL
812337	2004 TR_{80}	—	October 5, 2004	Kitt Peak	Spacewatch	·	2.3 km	MPC · JPL
812338	2004 TZ_{84}	—	October 5, 2004	Kitt Peak	Spacewatch	·	460 m	MPC · JPL
812339	2004 TJ_{85}	—	October 5, 2004	Kitt Peak	Spacewatch	V	450 m	MPC · JPL
812340	2004 TC_{88}	—	October 5, 2004	Kitt Peak	Spacewatch	·	2.3 km	MPC · JPL
812341	2004 TT_{101}	—	October 6, 2004	Kitt Peak	Spacewatch	NYS	740 m	MPC · JPL
812342	2004 TU_{140}	—	October 4, 2004	Kitt Peak	Spacewatch	·	420 m	MPC · JPL
812343	2004 TT_{149}	—	October 6, 2004	Kitt Peak	Spacewatch	NYS	770 m	MPC · JPL
812344	2004 TD_{155}	—	October 6, 2004	Kitt Peak	Spacewatch	·	1.2 km	MPC · JPL
812345	2004 TS_{175}	—	October 9, 2004	Socorro	LINEAR	·	1.2 km	MPC · JPL
812346	2004 TV_{178}	—	October 7, 2004	Kitt Peak	Spacewatch	V	430 m	MPC · JPL
812347	2004 TZ_{187}	—	September 23, 2004	Kitt Peak	Spacewatch	·	500 m	MPC · JPL
812348	2004 TM_{188}	—	September 23, 2004	Kitt Peak	Spacewatch	·	1.1 km	MPC · JPL
812349	2004 TR_{189}	—	October 7, 2004	Kitt Peak	Spacewatch	·	790 m	MPC · JPL
812350	2004 TH_{195}	—	October 7, 2004	Kitt Peak	Spacewatch	·	2.5 km	MPC · JPL
812351	2004 TX_{197}	—	October 7, 2004	Kitt Peak	Spacewatch	·	2.7 km	MPC · JPL
812352	2004 TV_{217}	—	October 5, 2004	Kitt Peak	Spacewatch	·	880 m	MPC · JPL
812353	2004 TS_{225}	—	October 8, 2004	Kitt Peak	Spacewatch	·	1.8 km	MPC · JPL
812354	2004 TW_{237}	—	October 9, 2004	Kitt Peak	Spacewatch	·	1.6 km	MPC · JPL
812355	2004 TB_{241}	—	September 18, 2004	Socorro	LINEAR	·	1.4 km	MPC · JPL
812356	2004 TV_{243}	—	October 6, 2004	Kitt Peak	Spacewatch	·	860 m	MPC · JPL
812357	2004 TQ_{244}	—	September 10, 2004	Kitt Peak	Spacewatch	·	710 m	MPC · JPL
812358	2004 TD_{255}	—	October 9, 2004	Kitt Peak	Spacewatch	·	740 m	MPC · JPL
812359	2004 TR_{259}	—	October 9, 2004	Kitt Peak	Spacewatch	·	1.4 km	MPC · JPL
812360	2004 TD_{265}	—	October 9, 2004	Kitt Peak	Spacewatch	·	720 m	MPC · JPL
812361	2004 TN_{270}	—	October 9, 2004	Kitt Peak	Spacewatch	MAS	570 m	MPC · JPL
812362	2004 TC_{275}	—	October 9, 2004	Kitt Peak	Spacewatch	·	860 m	MPC · JPL
812363	2004 TL_{296}	—	October 10, 2004	Kitt Peak	Spacewatch	NYS	840 m	MPC · JPL
812364	2004 TO_{303}	—	October 10, 2004	Kitt Peak	Spacewatch	·	1.0 km	MPC · JPL
812365	2004 TY_{309}	—	October 10, 2004	Kitt Peak	Spacewatch	ADE	1.3 km	MPC · JPL
812366	2004 TN_{317}	—	October 7, 2004	Kitt Peak	Spacewatch	·	690 m	MPC · JPL
812367	2004 TF_{319}	—	October 6, 2004	Kitt Peak	Spacewatch	·	670 m	MPC · JPL
812368	2004 TB_{332}	—	October 9, 2004	Kitt Peak	Spacewatch	·	1.4 km	MPC · JPL
812369	2004 TF_{341}	—	October 13, 2004	Kitt Peak	Spacewatch	·	2.1 km	MPC · JPL
812370	2004 TX_{369}	—	December 23, 2012	Haleakala	Pan-STARRS 1	·	870 m	MPC · JPL
812371	2004 TV_{371}	—	October 15, 2004	Mount Lemmon	Mount Lemmon Survey	·	780 m	MPC · JPL
812372	2004 TC_{375}	—	July 26, 2011	Haleakala	Pan-STARRS 1	NYS	1.1 km	MPC · JPL
812373	2004 TE_{378}	—	October 10, 2004	Kitt Peak	Spacewatch	·	980 m	MPC · JPL
812374	2004 TJ_{380}	—	October 9, 2004	Kitt Peak	Spacewatch	·	1.0 km	MPC · JPL
812375	2004 TT_{380}	—	September 8, 2011	Kitt Peak	Spacewatch	·	750 m	MPC · JPL
812376	2004 TO_{381}	—	June 4, 2010	Nogales	M. Schwartz, P. R. Holvorcem	·	560 m	MPC · JPL
812377	2004 TR_{382}	—	October 27, 2017	Haleakala	Pan-STARRS 1	·	420 m	MPC · JPL
812378	2004 TT_{383}	—	December 10, 2015	Haleakala	Pan-STARRS 1	·	690 m	MPC · JPL
812379	2004 TQ_{384}	—	May 7, 2014	Haleakala	Pan-STARRS 1	·	2.3 km	MPC · JPL
812380	2004 TZ_{384}	—	October 15, 2004	Kitt Peak	Deep Ecliptic Survey	·	900 m	MPC · JPL
812381	2004 TL_{387}	—	October 6, 2004	Kitt Peak	Spacewatch	·	920 m	MPC · JPL
812382	2004 TM_{387}	—	October 8, 2004	Kitt Peak	Spacewatch	·	1.0 km	MPC · JPL
812383	2004 UA_{2}	—	October 8, 2004	Socorro	LINEAR	·	1.2 km	MPC · JPL
812384	2004 UC_{12}	—	October 23, 2004	Kitt Peak	Spacewatch	·	1.1 km	MPC · JPL
812385	2004 VA_{68}	—	April 5, 2003	Kitt Peak	Spacewatch	JUN	600 m	MPC · JPL
812386	2004 VC_{100}	—	November 9, 2004	Mauna Kea	Veillet, C.	·	630 m	MPC · JPL
812387	2004 VU_{102}	—	November 9, 2004	Mauna Kea	Veillet, C.	·	1.0 km	MPC · JPL
812388	2004 VW_{113}	—	June 1, 2008	Kitt Peak	Spacewatch	·	2.2 km	MPC · JPL
812389	2004 VX_{131}	—	September 6, 2008	Mount Lemmon	Mount Lemmon Survey	·	1.3 km	MPC · JPL
812390	2004 VP_{133}	—	March 10, 2016	Haleakala	Pan-STARRS 1	H	380 m	MPC · JPL
812391	2004 VJ_{134}	—	September 21, 2017	Haleakala	Pan-STARRS 1	·	1.1 km	MPC · JPL
812392	2004 VL_{134}	—	September 4, 2011	Haleakala	Pan-STARRS 1	·	720 m	MPC · JPL
812393	2004 VP_{134}	—	October 3, 2008	Mount Lemmon	Mount Lemmon Survey	·	860 m	MPC · JPL
812394	2004 VT_{135}	—	October 26, 2013	Catalina	CSS	·	1.4 km	MPC · JPL
812395	2004 VY_{137}	—	November 9, 2004	Kitt Peak	Deep Ecliptic Survey	·	1.2 km	MPC · JPL
812396	2004 WC_{6}	—	November 4, 2004	Kitt Peak	Spacewatch	·	710 m	MPC · JPL
812397	2004 WE_{7}	—	November 11, 2004	Kitt Peak	Spacewatch	·	1.5 km	MPC · JPL
812398	2004 WK_{14}	—	November 20, 2004	Kitt Peak	Spacewatch	·	2.4 km	MPC · JPL
812399	2004 XZ_{53}	—	December 10, 2004	Kitt Peak	Spacewatch	·	1.1 km	MPC · JPL
812400	2004 XH_{74}	—	December 8, 2004	Socorro	LINEAR	·	1.2 km	MPC · JPL

== 812401–812500 ==
back to top

Designation			Discovery			Properties		Ref
Permanent	Provisional	Named after	Date	Site	Discoverer(s)	Category	Diam.	Ref
812401	2004 XC_{112}	—	December 10, 2004	Kitt Peak	Spacewatch	PHO	630 m	MPC · JPL
812402	2004 XS_{112}	—	December 10, 2004	Kitt Peak	Spacewatch	·	1.5 km	MPC · JPL
812403	2004 XB_{154}	—	December 15, 2004	Kitt Peak	Spacewatch	·	1.9 km	MPC · JPL
812404	2004 XK_{168}	—	November 4, 2004	Socorro	LINEAR	T_{j} (2.98)	3.2 km	MPC · JPL
812405	2004 XF_{195}	—	November 7, 2008	Mount Lemmon	Mount Lemmon Survey	·	850 m	MPC · JPL
812406	2004 XG_{197}	—	February 5, 2016	Haleakala	Pan-STARRS 1	·	660 m	MPC · JPL
812407	2004 XG_{198}	—	December 14, 2013	Mount Lemmon	Mount Lemmon Survey	·	1.4 km	MPC · JPL
812408	2004 YE_{32}	—	December 11, 2004	Catalina	CSS	·	1.4 km	MPC · JPL
812409	2004 YV_{38}	—	April 24, 2015	Haleakala	Pan-STARRS 1	·	1.7 km	MPC · JPL
812410	2005 AP_{66}	—	January 13, 2005	Kitt Peak	Spacewatch	·	370 m	MPC · JPL
812411	2005 AY_{83}	—	January 7, 2005	Kitt Peak	Spacewatch	·	550 m	MPC · JPL
812412	2005 BS_{12}	—	December 11, 2004	Kitt Peak	Spacewatch	·	740 m	MPC · JPL
812413	2005 BW_{17}	—	January 16, 2005	Kitt Peak	Spacewatch	·	1.1 km	MPC · JPL
812414	2005 BD_{34}	—	January 16, 2005	Mauna Kea	Veillet, C.	NYS	720 m	MPC · JPL
812415	2005 BC_{40}	—	January 16, 2005	Mauna Kea	Veillet, C.	·	1.5 km	MPC · JPL
812416	2005 BM_{40}	—	January 16, 2005	Mauna Kea	Veillet, C.	·	970 m	MPC · JPL
812417	2005 BS_{41}	—	January 16, 2005	Mauna Kea	Veillet, C.	·	2.3 km	MPC · JPL
812418	2005 BC_{52}	—	January 18, 2005	Kitt Peak	Spacewatch	·	910 m	MPC · JPL
812419	2005 BF_{54}	—	January 18, 2005	Kitt Peak	Spacewatch	·	490 m	MPC · JPL
812420	2005 BY_{54}	—	September 25, 2017	Haleakala	Pan-STARRS 1	·	1.4 km	MPC · JPL
812421	2005 BF_{55}	—	January 18, 2005	Kitt Peak	Spacewatch	EUN	1.2 km	MPC · JPL
812422	2005 BW_{56}	—	January 16, 2005	Kitt Peak	Spacewatch	·	1.0 km	MPC · JPL
812423	2005 CQ_{54}	—	February 4, 2005	Mount Lemmon	Mount Lemmon Survey	V	430 m	MPC · JPL
812424	2005 CJ_{56}	—	February 9, 2005	Kitt Peak	Spacewatch	·	2.3 km	MPC · JPL
812425	2005 CA_{83}	—	November 1, 2006	Mount Lemmon	Mount Lemmon Survey	·	1.5 km	MPC · JPL
812426	2005 CX_{83}	—	December 1, 2008	Mount Lemmon	Mount Lemmon Survey	·	1.1 km	MPC · JPL
812427	2005 CA_{86}	—	February 2, 2005	Kitt Peak	Spacewatch	·	560 m	MPC · JPL
812428	2005 CE_{86}	—	February 2, 2005	Kitt Peak	Spacewatch	·	890 m	MPC · JPL
812429	2005 CV_{86}	—	February 2, 2005	Kitt Peak	Spacewatch	·	2.5 km	MPC · JPL
812430	2005 EZ_{7}	—	March 1, 2005	Kitt Peak	Spacewatch	·	1.5 km	MPC · JPL
812431	2005 ED_{89}	—	March 8, 2005	Kitt Peak	Spacewatch	·	740 m	MPC · JPL
812432	2005 EN_{100}	—	March 3, 2005	Kitt Peak	Spacewatch	·	2.2 km	MPC · JPL
812433	2005 ER_{128}	—	March 9, 2005	Kitt Peak	Spacewatch	NYS	880 m	MPC · JPL
812434	2005 ER_{134}	—	March 9, 2005	Mount Lemmon	Mount Lemmon Survey	·	520 m	MPC · JPL
812435	2005 EO_{145}	—	March 10, 2005	Mount Lemmon	Mount Lemmon Survey	·	1.7 km	MPC · JPL
812436	2005 EX_{157}	—	March 9, 2005	Mount Lemmon	Mount Lemmon Survey	ERI	1.1 km	MPC · JPL
812437	2005 EC_{166}	—	March 4, 2005	Mount Lemmon	Mount Lemmon Survey	·	1.9 km	MPC · JPL
812438	2005 ET_{192}	—	March 11, 2005	Mount Lemmon	Mount Lemmon Survey	·	470 m	MPC · JPL
812439	2005 EN_{208}	—	March 4, 2005	Kitt Peak	Spacewatch	·	460 m	MPC · JPL
812440	2005 EU_{227}	—	March 9, 2005	Socorro	LINEAR	·	1.7 km	MPC · JPL
812441	2005 EK_{264}	—	March 13, 2005	Kitt Peak	Spacewatch	3:2 · SHU	4.5 km	MPC · JPL
812442	2005 EJ_{268}	—	September 19, 2003	Palomar	NEAT	H	380 m	MPC · JPL
812443	2005 EG_{302}	—	March 11, 2005	Kitt Peak	Deep Ecliptic Survey	KOR	940 m	MPC · JPL
812444	2005 EN_{334}	—	March 10, 2005	Catalina	CSS	PHO	740 m	MPC · JPL
812445	2005 ET_{338}	—	April 5, 2014	Haleakala	Pan-STARRS 1	EUN	850 m	MPC · JPL
812446	2005 EV_{338}	—	March 11, 2005	Kitt Peak	Deep Ecliptic Survey	·	440 m	MPC · JPL
812447	2005 EF_{339}	—	January 18, 2008	Mount Lemmon	Mount Lemmon Survey	·	550 m	MPC · JPL
812448	2005 EZ_{339}	—	October 1, 2014	Haleakala	Pan-STARRS 1	H	340 m	MPC · JPL
812449	2005 ED_{340}	—	March 10, 2005	Mount Lemmon	Mount Lemmon Survey	·	1.2 km	MPC · JPL
812450	2005 ET_{341}	—	October 30, 2013	Haleakala	Pan-STARRS 1	·	500 m	MPC · JPL
812451	2005 EV_{344}	—	April 20, 2015	Haleakala	Pan-STARRS 1	·	480 m	MPC · JPL
812452	2005 EK_{347}	—	December 19, 2007	Kitt Peak	Spacewatch	·	530 m	MPC · JPL
812453	2005 EW_{348}	—	March 10, 2005	Kitt Peak	Deep Ecliptic Survey	·	1.2 km	MPC · JPL
812454	2005 EF_{350}	—	March 3, 2005	Kitt Peak	Spacewatch	·	500 m	MPC · JPL
812455	2005 GH_{17}	—	March 10, 2005	Mount Lemmon	Mount Lemmon Survey	·	1.7 km	MPC · JPL
812456	2005 GZ_{76}	—	February 9, 2005	Mount Lemmon	Mount Lemmon Survey	·	520 m	MPC · JPL
812457	2005 GY_{81}	—	March 9, 2005	Mount Lemmon	Mount Lemmon Survey	·	2.2 km	MPC · JPL
812458	2005 GW_{93}	—	April 6, 2005	Kitt Peak	Spacewatch	·	530 m	MPC · JPL
812459	2005 GQ_{115}	—	April 11, 2005	Kitt Peak	Spacewatch	THM	1.9 km	MPC · JPL
812460	2005 GG_{122}	—	February 3, 2012	Haleakala	Pan-STARRS 1	·	550 m	MPC · JPL
812461	2005 GS_{138}	—	April 1, 2005	Kitt Peak	Spacewatch	·	540 m	MPC · JPL
812462	2005 GZ_{188}	—	April 12, 2005	Kitt Peak	Deep Ecliptic Survey	·	810 m	MPC · JPL
812463	2005 GN_{214}	—	March 9, 2005	Mount Lemmon	Mount Lemmon Survey	·	530 m	MPC · JPL
812464	2005 GA_{219}	—	April 2, 2005	Mount Lemmon	Mount Lemmon Survey	·	1.6 km	MPC · JPL
812465	2005 GM_{223}	—	April 11, 2005	Mount Lemmon	Mount Lemmon Survey	AEO	780 m	MPC · JPL
812466	2005 GX_{232}	—	January 22, 2015	Haleakala	Pan-STARRS 1	·	420 m	MPC · JPL
812467	2005 GY_{232}	—	April 10, 2005	Mount Lemmon	Mount Lemmon Survey	·	470 m	MPC · JPL
812468	2005 GM_{233}	—	September 18, 2010	Mount Lemmon	Mount Lemmon Survey	PHO	620 m	MPC · JPL
812469	2005 GT_{234}	—	February 10, 2018	Haleakala	Pan-STARRS 1	H	340 m	MPC · JPL
812470	2005 GL_{235}	—	October 8, 2015	Haleakala	Pan-STARRS 1	·	1.1 km	MPC · JPL
812471	2005 GT_{236}	—	March 23, 2015	Haleakala	Pan-STARRS 1	·	550 m	MPC · JPL
812472	2005 HM_{11}	—	April 30, 2005	Kitt Peak	Spacewatch	·	550 m	MPC · JPL
812473	2005 HO_{12}	—	April 17, 2005	Kitt Peak	Spacewatch	·	2.3 km	MPC · JPL
812474	2005 JA_{24}	—	May 3, 2005	Kitt Peak	Spacewatch	·	510 m	MPC · JPL
812475	2005 JE_{24}	—	May 3, 2005	Kitt Peak	Spacewatch	·	920 m	MPC · JPL
812476	2005 JV_{41}	—	May 8, 2005	Kitt Peak	Spacewatch	·	1.1 km	MPC · JPL
812477	2005 JY_{45}	—	May 4, 2005	Kitt Peak	Spacewatch	H	340 m	MPC · JPL
812478	2005 JJ_{50}	—	May 4, 2005	Kitt Peak	Spacewatch	H	510 m	MPC · JPL
812479	2005 JC_{103}	—	May 9, 2005	Kitt Peak	Spacewatch	T_{j} (2.97)	3.2 km	MPC · JPL
812480	2005 JZ_{123}	—	April 11, 2005	Mount Lemmon	Mount Lemmon Survey	·	430 m	MPC · JPL
812481	2005 JO_{131}	—	May 13, 2005	Mount Lemmon	Mount Lemmon Survey	·	650 m	MPC · JPL
812482	2005 JC_{171}	—	May 10, 2005	Cerro Tololo	Deep Ecliptic Survey	·	460 m	MPC · JPL
812483	2005 JR_{172}	—	May 10, 2005	Cerro Tololo	Deep Ecliptic Survey	·	360 m	MPC · JPL
812484	2005 JR_{176}	—	May 10, 2005	Kitt Peak	Spacewatch	·	1.3 km	MPC · JPL
812485	2005 JX_{188}	—	April 10, 2013	Haleakala	Pan-STARRS 1	·	1.3 km	MPC · JPL
812486	2005 JA_{189}	—	May 4, 2005	Siding Spring	SSS	·	1.6 km	MPC · JPL
812487	2005 JC_{189}	—	April 4, 2014	Haleakala	Pan-STARRS 1	·	1.3 km	MPC · JPL
812488	2005 JB_{190}	—	October 18, 2011	Kitt Peak	Spacewatch	·	1.3 km	MPC · JPL
812489	2005 JK_{191}	—	November 21, 2017	Haleakala	Pan-STARRS 1	·	600 m	MPC · JPL
812490	2005 KS	—	May 18, 2005	Palomar	NEAT	H	400 m	MPC · JPL
812491	2005 KK_{14}	—	February 23, 2012	Mount Lemmon	Mount Lemmon Survey	MAS	520 m	MPC · JPL
812492	2005 LQ_{1}	—	June 1, 2005	Mount Lemmon	Mount Lemmon Survey	RAF	710 m	MPC · JPL
812493	2005 LP_{12}	—	June 5, 2005	Kitt Peak	Spacewatch	H	470 m	MPC · JPL
812494	2005 LN_{33}	—	May 10, 2005	Kitt Peak	Spacewatch	·	610 m	MPC · JPL
812495	2005 LR_{36}	—	May 16, 2005	Palomar	NEAT	THB	2.2 km	MPC · JPL
812496	2005 LY_{46}	—	June 13, 2005	Kitt Peak	Spacewatch	·	810 m	MPC · JPL
812497	2005 LH_{56}	—	October 2, 2006	Mount Lemmon	Mount Lemmon Survey	·	1.3 km	MPC · JPL
812498	2005 LK_{57}	—	June 14, 2005	Kitt Peak	Spacewatch	·	1.8 km	MPC · JPL
812499	2005 LX_{58}	—	June 14, 2005	Mount Lemmon	Mount Lemmon Survey	·	2.0 km	MPC · JPL
812500	2005 LL_{59}	—	June 14, 2005	Mount Lemmon	Mount Lemmon Survey	·	870 m	MPC · JPL

== 812501–812600 ==
back to top

Designation			Discovery			Properties		Ref
Permanent	Provisional	Named after	Date	Site	Discoverer(s)	Category	Diam.	Ref
812501	2005 MN	—	June 17, 2005	Mount Lemmon	Mount Lemmon Survey	H	340 m	MPC · JPL
812502	2005 MP	—	June 17, 2005	Mount Lemmon	Mount Lemmon Survey	·	1.5 km	MPC · JPL
812503	2005 MA_{14}	—	June 11, 2005	Kitt Peak	Spacewatch	·	510 m	MPC · JPL
812504	2005 MK_{15}	—	June 29, 2005	Palomar	NEAT	·	890 m	MPC · JPL
812505	2005 MT_{55}	—	June 14, 2009	Mount Lemmon	Mount Lemmon Survey	·	1.0 km	MPC · JPL
812506	2005 MV_{55}	—	June 17, 2005	Mount Lemmon	Mount Lemmon Survey	·	570 m	MPC · JPL
812507	2005 NV_{10}	—	April 17, 2001	Kitt Peak	Spacewatch	NYS	820 m	MPC · JPL
812508	2005 NZ_{10}	—	July 3, 2005	Mount Lemmon	Mount Lemmon Survey	·	540 m	MPC · JPL
812509	2005 NS_{19}	—	July 5, 2005	Mount Lemmon	Mount Lemmon Survey	·	520 m	MPC · JPL
812510	2005 NW_{19}	—	July 5, 2005	Mount Lemmon	Mount Lemmon Survey	·	520 m	MPC · JPL
812511	2005 NA_{24}	—	July 4, 2005	Kitt Peak	Spacewatch	·	720 m	MPC · JPL
812512	2005 NC_{34}	—	July 5, 2005	Kitt Peak	Spacewatch	·	860 m	MPC · JPL
812513	2005 NK_{38}	—	July 6, 2005	Kitt Peak	Spacewatch	·	970 m	MPC · JPL
812514	2005 NW_{52}	—	July 10, 2005	Kitt Peak	Spacewatch	·	440 m	MPC · JPL
812515	2005 NA_{58}	—	July 6, 2005	Kitt Peak	Spacewatch	·	550 m	MPC · JPL
812516	2005 NB_{62}	—	July 11, 2005	Kitt Peak	Spacewatch	·	1.3 km	MPC · JPL
812517	2005 NO_{75}	—	July 10, 2005	Kitt Peak	Spacewatch	·	870 m	MPC · JPL
812518	2005 NB_{79}	—	July 12, 2005	Mount Lemmon	Mount Lemmon Survey	·	440 m	MPC · JPL
812519	2005 NL_{82}	—	July 3, 2005	Mount Lemmon	Mount Lemmon Survey	·	460 m	MPC · JPL
812520	2005 NJ_{83}	—	July 1, 2005	Kitt Peak	Spacewatch	·	510 m	MPC · JPL
812521	2005 NA_{89}	—	July 4, 2005	Mount Lemmon	Mount Lemmon Survey	·	790 m	MPC · JPL
812522	2005 NF_{99}	—	July 10, 2005	Kitt Peak	Spacewatch	·	640 m	MPC · JPL
812523	2005 NZ_{101}	—	July 3, 2005	Mount Lemmon	Mount Lemmon Survey	·	770 m	MPC · JPL
812524	2005 NA_{104}	—	July 7, 2005	Mauna Kea	Veillet, C.	·	1.3 km	MPC · JPL
812525	2005 NY_{107}	—	July 7, 2005	Mauna Kea	Veillet, C.	·	1.2 km	MPC · JPL
812526	2005 NT_{111}	—	September 2, 2011	Haleakala	Pan-STARRS 1	·	2.0 km	MPC · JPL
812527	2005 NC_{115}	—	July 15, 2005	Mount Lemmon	Mount Lemmon Survey	·	690 m	MPC · JPL
812528	2005 NC_{128}	—	February 13, 2011	Mount Lemmon	Mount Lemmon Survey	(2076)	560 m	MPC · JPL
812529	2005 NC_{129}	—	July 4, 2005	Kitt Peak	Spacewatch	·	1.9 km	MPC · JPL
812530	2005 NO_{129}	—	October 5, 2016	Mount Lemmon	Mount Lemmon Survey	·	1.5 km	MPC · JPL
812531	2005 NR_{129}	—	July 1, 2005	Kitt Peak	Spacewatch	·	1.4 km	MPC · JPL
812532	2005 NV_{130}	—	May 8, 2013	Haleakala	Pan-STARRS 1	·	1.1 km	MPC · JPL
812533	2005 NA_{131}	—	November 25, 2009	Kitt Peak	Spacewatch	·	540 m	MPC · JPL
812534	2005 ND_{132}	—	July 11, 2005	Kitt Peak	Spacewatch	·	630 m	MPC · JPL
812535	2005 NA_{133}	—	July 8, 2005	Kitt Peak	Spacewatch	KON	1.9 km	MPC · JPL
812536	2005 NY_{133}	—	July 9, 2005	Kitt Peak	Spacewatch	·	480 m	MPC · JPL
812537	2005 OD_{33}	—	April 30, 2008	Kitt Peak	Spacewatch	·	530 m	MPC · JPL
812538	2005 OY_{33}	—	September 24, 2012	Mount Lemmon	Mount Lemmon Survey	·	510 m	MPC · JPL
812539	2005 OC_{34}	—	October 11, 2012	Haleakala	Pan-STARRS 1	·	570 m	MPC · JPL
812540	2005 PE_{30}	—	September 1, 2005	Kitt Peak	Spacewatch	·	1.2 km	MPC · JPL
812541	2005 PE_{31}	—	February 26, 2014	Haleakala	Pan-STARRS 1	·	680 m	MPC · JPL
812542	2005 PN_{32}	—	August 5, 2005	Palomar	NEAT	·	910 m	MPC · JPL
812543	2005 PT_{32}	—	August 5, 2005	Palomar	NEAT	·	1.4 km	MPC · JPL
812544	2005 QC	—	August 22, 2005	Siding Spring	SSS	APO	600 m	MPC · JPL
812545	2005 QT_{3}	—	July 30, 2005	Palomar	NEAT	·	920 m	MPC · JPL
812546	2005 QO_{29}	—	July 31, 2005	Palomar	NEAT	EUN	890 m	MPC · JPL
812547	2005 QG_{45}	—	August 28, 2005	Kitt Peak	Spacewatch	·	600 m	MPC · JPL
812548	2005 QE_{47}	—	August 28, 2005	Kitt Peak	Spacewatch	·	1.4 km	MPC · JPL
812549	2005 QY_{63}	—	August 26, 2005	Palomar	NEAT	·	1.9 km	MPC · JPL
812550	2005 QH_{69}	—	July 29, 2005	Palomar	NEAT	·	1.4 km	MPC · JPL
812551	2005 QD_{85}	—	August 30, 2005	Kitt Peak	Spacewatch	H	400 m	MPC · JPL
812552	2005 QA_{93}	—	August 26, 2005	Palomar	NEAT	(5)	910 m	MPC · JPL
812553	2005 QH_{101}	—	August 30, 2005	Kitt Peak	Spacewatch	·	560 m	MPC · JPL
812554	2005 QB_{102}	—	August 29, 2005	Kitt Peak	Spacewatch	·	600 m	MPC · JPL
812555	2005 QR_{104}	—	October 23, 2001	Kitt Peak	Spacewatch	(5)	870 m	MPC · JPL
812556	2005 QO_{107}	—	August 29, 2005	Kitt Peak	Spacewatch	·	830 m	MPC · JPL
812557	2005 QN_{109}	—	August 30, 2005	Campo Imperatore	CINEOS	·	2.4 km	MPC · JPL
812558	2005 QC_{110}	—	August 30, 2005	Kitt Peak	Spacewatch	·	1.7 km	MPC · JPL
812559	2005 QR_{111}	—	August 30, 2005	Kitt Peak	Spacewatch	·	480 m	MPC · JPL
812560	2005 QR_{122}	—	August 28, 2005	Kitt Peak	Spacewatch	PHO	550 m	MPC · JPL
812561	2005 QT_{129}	—	August 28, 2005	Kitt Peak	Spacewatch	·	780 m	MPC · JPL
812562	2005 QH_{130}	—	August 28, 2005	Kitt Peak	Spacewatch	·	890 m	MPC · JPL
812563	2005 QX_{134}	—	August 28, 2005	Kitt Peak	Spacewatch	·	830 m	MPC · JPL
812564	2005 QO_{137}	—	September 12, 1996	Kitt Peak	Spacewatch	·	1.4 km	MPC · JPL
812565	2005 QP_{140}	—	August 28, 2005	Kitt Peak	Spacewatch	·	1.8 km	MPC · JPL
812566	2005 QB_{158}	—	August 26, 2005	Palomar	NEAT	·	980 m	MPC · JPL
812567	2005 QT_{176}	—	August 29, 2005	Palomar	NEAT	T_{j} (2.84)	1.9 km	MPC · JPL
812568	2005 QC_{177}	—	July 30, 2005	Palomar	NEAT	·	490 m	MPC · JPL
812569	2005 QS_{187}	—	August 25, 2005	Palomar	NEAT	·	760 m	MPC · JPL
812570	2005 QH_{193}	—	August 16, 2009	Kitt Peak	Spacewatch	·	740 m	MPC · JPL
812571	2005 QH_{197}	—	August 29, 2005	Kitt Peak	Spacewatch	·	800 m	MPC · JPL
812572	2005 QX_{199}	—	August 29, 2005	Kitt Peak	Spacewatch	·	560 m	MPC · JPL
812573	2005 QW_{200}	—	August 18, 2017	ESA OGS	ESA OGS	·	870 m	MPC · JPL
812574	2005 QA_{205}	—	August 31, 2005	Kitt Peak	Spacewatch	·	500 m	MPC · JPL
812575	2005 QC_{205}	—	August 31, 2005	Kitt Peak	Spacewatch	V	460 m	MPC · JPL
812576	2005 QG_{205}	—	August 30, 2005	Kitt Peak	Spacewatch	·	1.8 km	MPC · JPL
812577	2005 QO_{205}	—	August 29, 2005	Kitt Peak	Spacewatch	·	830 m	MPC · JPL
812578	2005 QT_{206}	—	August 31, 2005	Kitt Peak	Spacewatch	NYS	710 m	MPC · JPL
812579	2005 QZ_{207}	—	August 26, 2005	Palomar	NEAT	·	860 m	MPC · JPL
812580	2005 QR_{208}	—	August 30, 2005	Kitt Peak	Spacewatch	EMA	2.2 km	MPC · JPL
812581	2005 QZ_{210}	—	October 8, 2012	Haleakala	Pan-STARRS 1	·	410 m	MPC · JPL
812582	2005 RJ_{1}	—	September 1, 2005	Palomar	NEAT	·	620 m	MPC · JPL
812583	2005 RW_{25}	—	August 29, 2005	Kitt Peak	Spacewatch	H	320 m	MPC · JPL
812584	2005 RV_{28}	—	August 26, 2005	Palomar	NEAT	H	320 m	MPC · JPL
812585	2005 RD_{39}	—	September 3, 2005	Mauna Kea	Veillet, C.	PHO	770 m	MPC · JPL
812586	2005 RY_{46}	—	September 26, 2005	Sacramento Peak	SDSS Collaboration	DOR	1.9 km	MPC · JPL
812587	2005 RH_{51}	—	September 1, 2005	Kitt Peak	Spacewatch	·	1.6 km	MPC · JPL
812588	2005 RA_{54}	—	September 1, 2005	Palomar	NEAT	EUN	1.0 km	MPC · JPL
812589	2005 RK_{54}	—	November 7, 2012	Kitt Peak	Spacewatch	·	520 m	MPC · JPL
812590	2005 RZ_{54}	—	October 14, 2012	Kitt Peak	Spacewatch	·	520 m	MPC · JPL
812591	2005 RG_{55}	—	July 8, 2013	Siding Spring	SSS	EUN	950 m	MPC · JPL
812592	2005 RB_{57}	—	September 1, 2005	Kitt Peak	Spacewatch	·	610 m	MPC · JPL
812593	2005 RM_{57}	—	August 26, 2012	Haleakala	Pan-STARRS 1	·	620 m	MPC · JPL
812594	2005 RX_{58}	—	September 1, 2005	Kitt Peak	Spacewatch	·	850 m	MPC · JPL
812595	2005 RO_{60}	—	September 13, 2005	Kitt Peak	Spacewatch	·	1.1 km	MPC · JPL
812596	2005 RA_{63}	—	September 1, 2005	Kitt Peak	Spacewatch	·	1.4 km	MPC · JPL
812597	2005 RV_{63}	—	November 9, 2018	Haleakala	Pan-STARRS 2	KON	1.6 km	MPC · JPL
812598	2005 RJ_{64}	—	September 14, 2005	Kitt Peak	Spacewatch	·	940 m	MPC · JPL
812599	2005 SH_{9}	—	September 23, 2005	Catalina	CSS	PHO	880 m	MPC · JPL
812600	2005 SH_{17}	—	September 26, 2005	Kitt Peak	Spacewatch	·	1.2 km	MPC · JPL

== 812601–812700 ==
back to top

Designation			Discovery			Properties		Ref
Permanent	Provisional	Named after	Date	Site	Discoverer(s)	Category	Diam.	Ref
812601	2005 SU_{27}	—	September 23, 2005	Kitt Peak	Spacewatch	(5)	830 m	MPC · JPL
812602	2005 SG_{50}	—	September 24, 2005	Kitt Peak	Spacewatch	·	1.0 km	MPC · JPL
812603	2005 SG_{82}	—	September 24, 2005	Kitt Peak	Spacewatch	·	710 m	MPC · JPL
812604	2005 SL_{83}	—	September 24, 2005	Kitt Peak	Spacewatch	NYS	840 m	MPC · JPL
812605	2005 SY_{98}	—	September 25, 2005	Kitt Peak	Spacewatch	EUN	900 m	MPC · JPL
812606	2005 SZ_{111}	—	September 1, 2005	Palomar	NEAT	·	980 m	MPC · JPL
812607	2005 SQ_{112}	—	September 14, 2005	Catalina	CSS	·	670 m	MPC · JPL
812608	2005 SQ_{124}	—	September 29, 2005	Kitt Peak	Spacewatch	·	830 m	MPC · JPL
812609	2005 SQ_{130}	—	September 29, 2005	Mount Lemmon	Mount Lemmon Survey	·	2.2 km	MPC · JPL
812610	2005 SO_{145}	—	September 25, 2005	Kitt Peak	Spacewatch	·	2.4 km	MPC · JPL
812611	2005 SV_{150}	—	September 25, 2005	Kitt Peak	Spacewatch	·	1.9 km	MPC · JPL
812612	2005 SL_{158}	—	September 12, 2005	Kitt Peak	Spacewatch	H	320 m	MPC · JPL
812613	2005 SB_{169}	—	September 29, 2005	Kitt Peak	Spacewatch	·	880 m	MPC · JPL
812614	2005 SA_{173}	—	September 29, 2005	Kitt Peak	Spacewatch	·	1.4 km	MPC · JPL
812615	2005 SL_{177}	—	September 29, 2005	Kitt Peak	Spacewatch	ADE	1.4 km	MPC · JPL
812616	2005 SQ_{182}	—	September 29, 2005	Kitt Peak	Spacewatch	V	430 m	MPC · JPL
812617	2005 SZ_{200}	—	September 30, 2005	Kitt Peak	Spacewatch	·	1.6 km	MPC · JPL
812618	2005 SP_{208}	—	September 30, 2005	Mount Lemmon	Mount Lemmon Survey	AGN	950 m	MPC · JPL
812619	2005 SF_{216}	—	August 30, 2005	Anderson Mesa	LONEOS	·	970 m	MPC · JPL
812620	2005 SX_{218}	—	September 30, 2005	Mount Lemmon	Mount Lemmon Survey	TIR	2.0 km	MPC · JPL
812621	2005 SZ_{223}	—	September 29, 2005	Mount Lemmon	Mount Lemmon Survey	ERI	1.2 km	MPC · JPL
812622	2005 SC_{224}	—	September 29, 2005	Mount Lemmon	Mount Lemmon Survey	·	530 m	MPC · JPL
812623	2005 SO_{226}	—	September 30, 2005	Kitt Peak	Spacewatch	·	1.2 km	MPC · JPL
812624	2005 SF_{229}	—	September 30, 2005	Mount Lemmon	Mount Lemmon Survey	EOS	1.1 km	MPC · JPL
812625	2005 SY_{234}	—	September 29, 2005	Kitt Peak	Spacewatch	·	560 m	MPC · JPL
812626	2005 SD_{240}	—	September 30, 2005	Kitt Peak	Spacewatch	ERI	1.2 km	MPC · JPL
812627	2005 SK_{254}	—	June 17, 2005	Mount Lemmon	Mount Lemmon Survey	·	870 m	MPC · JPL
812628	2005 SE_{260}	—	September 26, 2005	Kitt Peak	Spacewatch	·	520 m	MPC · JPL
812629	2005 SQ_{273}	—	September 27, 2005	Kitt Peak	Spacewatch	·	1.9 km	MPC · JPL
812630	2005 SX_{283}	—	October 6, 2005	Kitt Peak	Spacewatch	·	1.5 km	MPC · JPL
812631	2005 SY_{285}	—	October 30, 2005	Sacramento Peak	SDSS Collaboration	·	1.8 km	MPC · JPL
812632	2005 SC_{286}	—	September 28, 2005	Sacramento Peak	SDSS Collaboration	EOS	1.2 km	MPC · JPL
812633	2005 SD_{288}	—	October 25, 2005	Sacramento Peak	SDSS Collaboration	·	2.1 km	MPC · JPL
812634	2005 SY_{288}	—	October 20, 2005	Sacramento Peak	SDSS Collaboration	·	1.3 km	MPC · JPL
812635	2005 SU_{296}	—	September 26, 2005	Kitt Peak	Spacewatch	HYG	2.1 km	MPC · JPL
812636	2005 SH_{297}	—	September 30, 2005	Kitt Peak	Spacewatch	·	440 m	MPC · JPL
812637	2005 SE_{299}	—	September 26, 2005	Kitt Peak	Spacewatch	·	490 m	MPC · JPL
812638	2005 SW_{299}	—	August 2, 2016	Haleakala	Pan-STARRS 1	·	960 m	MPC · JPL
812639	2005 SW_{303}	—	September 26, 2005	Catalina	CSS	·	710 m	MPC · JPL
812640	2005 SH_{305}	—	September 29, 2005	Mount Lemmon	Mount Lemmon Survey	·	810 m	MPC · JPL
812641	2005 TF_{12}	—	October 1, 2005	Kitt Peak	Spacewatch	·	960 m	MPC · JPL
812642	2005 TG_{13}	—	October 2, 2005	Mount Lemmon	Mount Lemmon Survey	·	1.4 km	MPC · JPL
812643	2005 TX_{18}	—	August 31, 2005	Kitt Peak	Spacewatch	3:2	4.8 km	MPC · JPL
812644	2005 TT_{35}	—	October 1, 2005	Kitt Peak	Spacewatch	·	690 m	MPC · JPL
812645	2005 TL_{37}	—	October 1, 2005	Mount Lemmon	Mount Lemmon Survey	·	650 m	MPC · JPL
812646	2005 TJ_{42}	—	September 29, 2005	Kitt Peak	Spacewatch	·	440 m	MPC · JPL
812647	2005 TY_{46}	—	October 3, 2005	Catalina	CSS	·	2.7 km	MPC · JPL
812648	2005 TL_{54}	—	October 1, 2005	Catalina	CSS	(1547)	1.3 km	MPC · JPL
812649	2005 TZ_{79}	—	October 2, 2005	Mount Lemmon	Mount Lemmon Survey	·	1.5 km	MPC · JPL
812650	2005 TY_{81}	—	September 23, 2005	Kitt Peak	Spacewatch	·	930 m	MPC · JPL
812651	2005 TU_{86}	—	October 5, 2005	Kitt Peak	Spacewatch	·	850 m	MPC · JPL
812652	2005 TE_{100}	—	September 26, 2005	Kitt Peak	Spacewatch	·	690 m	MPC · JPL
812653	2005 TE_{103}	—	September 30, 2005	Kitt Peak	Spacewatch	NYS	980 m	MPC · JPL
812654	2005 TM_{103}	—	September 29, 2005	Kitt Peak	Spacewatch	·	610 m	MPC · JPL
812655	2005 TB_{106}	—	August 31, 2005	Palomar	NEAT	NYS	990 m	MPC · JPL
812656	2005 TK_{113}	—	September 27, 2005	Kitt Peak	Spacewatch	NYS	700 m	MPC · JPL
812657	2005 TU_{123}	—	October 7, 2005	Mount Lemmon	Mount Lemmon Survey	H	340 m	MPC · JPL
812658	2005 TZ_{125}	—	September 29, 2005	Mount Lemmon	Mount Lemmon Survey	·	670 m	MPC · JPL
812659	2005 TD_{128}	—	October 7, 2005	Kitt Peak	Spacewatch	·	750 m	MPC · JPL
812660	2005 TE_{143}	—	October 8, 2005	Kitt Peak	Spacewatch	·	1.9 km	MPC · JPL
812661	2005 TC_{153}	—	October 6, 2005	Kitt Peak	Spacewatch	PHO	560 m	MPC · JPL
812662	2005 TP_{154}	—	October 9, 2005	Kitt Peak	Spacewatch	·	790 m	MPC · JPL
812663	2005 TW_{155}	—	April 29, 2001	Kitt Peak	Spacewatch	·	530 m	MPC · JPL
812664	2005 TZ_{157}	—	October 9, 2005	Kitt Peak	Spacewatch	·	530 m	MPC · JPL
812665	2005 TP_{166}	—	October 6, 2005	Mount Lemmon	Mount Lemmon Survey	·	560 m	MPC · JPL
812666	2005 TU_{168}	—	September 30, 2005	Mount Lemmon	Mount Lemmon Survey	MAS	490 m	MPC · JPL
812667	2005 TN_{174}	—	October 2, 2005	Mount Lemmon	Mount Lemmon Survey	·	490 m	MPC · JPL
812668	2005 TH_{179}	—	October 5, 2005	Mount Lemmon	Mount Lemmon Survey	·	560 m	MPC · JPL
812669	2005 TH_{185}	—	October 1, 2005	Mount Lemmon	Mount Lemmon Survey	·	540 m	MPC · JPL
812670	2005 TK_{185}	—	October 1, 2005	Mount Lemmon	Mount Lemmon Survey	·	910 m	MPC · JPL
812671	2005 TK_{192}	—	October 10, 2005	Catalina	CSS	·	1.3 km	MPC · JPL
812672	2005 TW_{196}	—	October 3, 2005	Kitt Peak	Spacewatch	·	870 m	MPC · JPL
812673	2005 TU_{197}	—	March 30, 2011	Haleakala	Pan-STARRS 1	·	470 m	MPC · JPL
812674	2005 TN_{199}	—	October 1, 2005	Mount Lemmon	Mount Lemmon Survey	·	570 m	MPC · JPL
812675	2005 TJ_{201}	—	October 7, 2005	Mauna Kea	A. Boattini	(5)	990 m	MPC · JPL
812676	2005 TW_{202}	—	August 12, 2012	Haleakala	Pan-STARRS 1	·	670 m	MPC · JPL
812677	2005 TL_{203}	—	August 28, 2016	Mount Lemmon	Mount Lemmon Survey	·	840 m	MPC · JPL
812678	2005 TD_{205}	—	August 10, 2016	Haleakala	Pan-STARRS 1	·	790 m	MPC · JPL
812679	2005 TG_{206}	—	October 1, 2005	Mount Lemmon	Mount Lemmon Survey	·	440 m	MPC · JPL
812680	2005 TX_{206}	—	November 13, 2010	Mount Lemmon	Mount Lemmon Survey	GEF	900 m	MPC · JPL
812681	2005 TB_{207}	—	March 2, 2011	Kitt Peak	Spacewatch	·	610 m	MPC · JPL
812682	2005 TQ_{208}	—	October 7, 2016	Haleakala	Pan-STARRS 1	·	930 m	MPC · JPL
812683	2005 TF_{209}	—	December 4, 2015	Haleakala	Pan-STARRS 1	·	470 m	MPC · JPL
812684	2005 TU_{209}	—	October 1, 2005	Kitt Peak	Spacewatch	·	640 m	MPC · JPL
812685	2005 TP_{211}	—	October 1, 2005	Catalina	CSS	·	2.2 km	MPC · JPL
812686	2005 TA_{215}	—	October 1, 2005	Mount Lemmon	Mount Lemmon Survey	·	700 m	MPC · JPL
812687	2005 TG_{216}	—	October 11, 2005	Kitt Peak	Spacewatch	PHO	550 m	MPC · JPL
812688	2005 TV_{220}	—	October 1, 2005	Kitt Peak	Spacewatch	·	1.9 km	MPC · JPL
812689	2005 TF_{225}	—	October 6, 2005	Kitt Peak	Spacewatch	·	960 m	MPC · JPL
812690	2005 TD_{227}	—	October 1, 2005	Mount Lemmon	Mount Lemmon Survey	·	2.3 km	MPC · JPL
812691	2005 UE_{7}	—	October 28, 2005	Vallemare Borbona	V. S. Casulli	EUN	860 m	MPC · JPL
812692	2005 UG_{13}	—	October 11, 2005	Kitt Peak	Spacewatch	·	500 m	MPC · JPL
812693	2005 UM_{32}	—	October 24, 2005	Kitt Peak	Spacewatch	·	2.2 km	MPC · JPL
812694	2005 UP_{36}	—	October 24, 2005	Kitt Peak	Spacewatch	·	920 m	MPC · JPL
812695	2005 UW_{44}	—	October 22, 2005	Kitt Peak	Spacewatch	(2076)	580 m	MPC · JPL
812696	2005 UU_{47}	—	October 22, 2005	Catalina	CSS	·	630 m	MPC · JPL
812697	2005 UE_{99}	—	October 22, 2005	Kitt Peak	Spacewatch	·	860 m	MPC · JPL
812698	2005 UG_{102}	—	October 22, 2005	Kitt Peak	Spacewatch	·	1.8 km	MPC · JPL
812699	2005 UU_{102}	—	October 22, 2005	Kitt Peak	Spacewatch	THM	1.5 km	MPC · JPL
812700	2005 UW_{111}	—	October 22, 2005	Kitt Peak	Spacewatch	NYS	700 m	MPC · JPL

== 812701–812800 ==
back to top

Designation			Discovery			Properties		Ref
Permanent	Provisional	Named after	Date	Site	Discoverer(s)	Category	Diam.	Ref
812701	2005 UQ_{113}	—	October 22, 2005	Kitt Peak	Spacewatch	·	750 m	MPC · JPL
812702	2005 UM_{115}	—	October 23, 2005	Kitt Peak	Spacewatch	TIN	820 m	MPC · JPL
812703	2005 UN_{139}	—	October 1, 2005	Mount Lemmon	Mount Lemmon Survey	MAS	620 m	MPC · JPL
812704	2005 UN_{144}	—	October 26, 2005	Kitt Peak	Spacewatch	·	1.0 km	MPC · JPL
812705	2005 UK_{146}	—	October 26, 2005	Kitt Peak	Spacewatch	·	1.6 km	MPC · JPL
812706	2005 UM_{146}	—	October 22, 2005	Kitt Peak	Spacewatch	·	2.9 km	MPC · JPL
812707	2005 UN_{171}	—	October 24, 2005	Kitt Peak	Spacewatch	·	1.0 km	MPC · JPL
812708	2005 UA_{172}	—	October 24, 2005	Kitt Peak	Spacewatch	MAS	540 m	MPC · JPL
812709	2005 UU_{178}	—	October 24, 2005	Kitt Peak	Spacewatch	HYG	2.1 km	MPC · JPL
812710	2005 UC_{203}	—	October 25, 2005	Kitt Peak	Spacewatch	·	530 m	MPC · JPL
812711	2005 UG_{220}	—	October 25, 2005	Kitt Peak	Spacewatch	·	1.8 km	MPC · JPL
812712	2005 UK_{220}	—	October 25, 2005	Kitt Peak	Spacewatch	V	470 m	MPC · JPL
812713	2005 UB_{224}	—	October 25, 2005	Kitt Peak	Spacewatch	·	670 m	MPC · JPL
812714	2005 UU_{225}	—	October 25, 2005	Kitt Peak	Spacewatch	·	500 m	MPC · JPL
812715	2005 UC_{226}	—	October 25, 2005	Kitt Peak	Spacewatch	·	2.3 km	MPC · JPL
812716	2005 UL_{244}	—	October 25, 2005	Kitt Peak	Spacewatch	H	420 m	MPC · JPL
812717	2005 UM_{247}	—	October 25, 2005	Kitt Peak	Spacewatch	·	630 m	MPC · JPL
812718	2005 UZ_{248}	—	October 28, 2005	Mount Lemmon	Mount Lemmon Survey	NYS	840 m	MPC · JPL
812719	2005 UT_{257}	—	October 25, 2005	Kitt Peak	Spacewatch	·	570 m	MPC · JPL
812720	2005 US_{300}	—	October 26, 2005	Kitt Peak	Spacewatch	·	1.8 km	MPC · JPL
812721	2005 UU_{305}	—	October 27, 2005	Mount Lemmon	Mount Lemmon Survey	·	810 m	MPC · JPL
812722	2005 UK_{320}	—	October 27, 2005	Kitt Peak	Spacewatch	·	1.2 km	MPC · JPL
812723	2005 UX_{358}	—	October 24, 2005	Kitt Peak	Spacewatch	H	330 m	MPC · JPL
812724	2005 UM_{359}	—	October 25, 2005	Kitt Peak	Spacewatch	·	2.0 km	MPC · JPL
812725	2005 UT_{363}	—	October 27, 2005	Kitt Peak	Spacewatch	MAS	530 m	MPC · JPL
812726	2005 UM_{369}	—	October 27, 2005	Kitt Peak	Spacewatch	·	480 m	MPC · JPL
812727	2005 UM_{370}	—	October 27, 2005	Kitt Peak	Spacewatch	·	640 m	MPC · JPL
812728	2005 US_{376}	—	October 27, 2005	Kitt Peak	Spacewatch	·	940 m	MPC · JPL
812729	2005 UA_{377}	—	October 22, 2005	Kitt Peak	Spacewatch	·	850 m	MPC · JPL
812730	2005 UN_{384}	—	October 27, 2005	Kitt Peak	Spacewatch	·	1.6 km	MPC · JPL
812731	2005 UZ_{389}	—	October 11, 2005	Kitt Peak	Spacewatch	·	1.9 km	MPC · JPL
812732	2005 UX_{393}	—	October 29, 2005	Mount Lemmon	Mount Lemmon Survey	·	1.6 km	MPC · JPL
812733	2005 UH_{400}	—	October 26, 2005	Kitt Peak	Spacewatch	·	2.2 km	MPC · JPL
812734	2005 UU_{402}	—	October 28, 2005	Kitt Peak	Spacewatch	H	360 m	MPC · JPL
812735	2005 UP_{408}	—	October 1, 2005	Kitt Peak	Spacewatch	·	1.1 km	MPC · JPL
812736	2005 UY_{413}	—	October 25, 2005	Kitt Peak	Spacewatch	V	450 m	MPC · JPL
812737	2005 UY_{414}	—	October 25, 2005	Kitt Peak	Spacewatch	·	470 m	MPC · JPL
812738	2005 UK_{420}	—	October 25, 2005	Kitt Peak	Spacewatch	·	460 m	MPC · JPL
812739	2005 US_{420}	—	October 25, 2005	Mount Lemmon	Mount Lemmon Survey	·	1.9 km	MPC · JPL
812740	2005 UW_{427}	—	October 28, 2005	Kitt Peak	Spacewatch	·	920 m	MPC · JPL
812741	2005 UU_{428}	—	September 30, 2005	Mount Lemmon	Mount Lemmon Survey	MAS	540 m	MPC · JPL
812742	2005 UZ_{433}	—	October 29, 2005	Kitt Peak	Spacewatch	PHO	730 m	MPC · JPL
812743	2005 UJ_{436}	—	October 30, 2005	Kitt Peak	Spacewatch	·	920 m	MPC · JPL
812744	2005 UC_{446}	—	October 10, 2005	Catalina	CSS	EUN	1.1 km	MPC · JPL
812745	2005 UW_{452}	—	October 29, 2005	Kitt Peak	Spacewatch	·	510 m	MPC · JPL
812746	2005 UB_{453}	—	October 29, 2005	Kitt Peak	Spacewatch	·	860 m	MPC · JPL
812747	2005 UM_{469}	—	October 30, 2005	Kitt Peak	Spacewatch	·	1.2 km	MPC · JPL
812748	2005 UT_{471}	—	October 30, 2005	Kitt Peak	Spacewatch	·	1.2 km	MPC · JPL
812749	2005 UR_{477}	—	October 26, 2005	Kitt Peak	Spacewatch	·	2.1 km	MPC · JPL
812750	2005 UW_{491}	—	October 24, 2005	Palomar	NEAT	·	1.1 km	MPC · JPL
812751	2005 UH_{512}	—	October 29, 2005	Catalina	CSS	·	1.2 km	MPC · JPL
812752	2005 UK_{516}	—	September 30, 2005	Mount Lemmon	Mount Lemmon Survey	V	440 m	MPC · JPL
812753	2005 UH_{519}	—	October 25, 2005	Sacramento Peak	SDSS Collaboration	(69559)	2.1 km	MPC · JPL
812754	2005 UV_{522}	—	October 27, 2005	Kitt Peak	Spacewatch	·	480 m	MPC · JPL
812755	2005 UJ_{523}	—	August 31, 2005	Palomar	NEAT	·	2.5 km	MPC · JPL
812756	2005 UV_{537}	—	September 21, 2009	Mount Lemmon	Mount Lemmon Survey	·	980 m	MPC · JPL
812757	2005 UZ_{539}	—	October 22, 2005	Kitt Peak	Spacewatch	·	980 m	MPC · JPL
812758	2005 UP_{542}	—	April 13, 2018	Haleakala	Pan-STARRS 1	·	610 m	MPC · JPL
812759	2005 US_{543}	—	October 25, 2005	Kitt Peak	Spacewatch	·	860 m	MPC · JPL
812760	2005 UE_{548}	—	October 27, 2005	Mount Lemmon	Mount Lemmon Survey	MAS	510 m	MPC · JPL
812761	2005 UH_{549}	—	October 25, 2005	Mount Lemmon	Mount Lemmon Survey	·	2.1 km	MPC · JPL
812762	2005 UO_{549}	—	October 27, 2005	Mount Lemmon	Mount Lemmon Survey	V	490 m	MPC · JPL
812763	2005 UV_{551}	—	October 26, 2005	Kitt Peak	Spacewatch	·	930 m	MPC · JPL
812764	2005 UG_{553}	—	October 25, 2005	Kitt Peak	Spacewatch	·	960 m	MPC · JPL
812765	2005 UL_{555}	—	October 25, 2005	Kitt Peak	Spacewatch	BRG	890 m	MPC · JPL
812766	2005 UM_{556}	—	October 30, 2005	Mount Lemmon	Mount Lemmon Survey	·	830 m	MPC · JPL
812767	2005 UN_{556}	—	October 30, 2005	Kitt Peak	Spacewatch	·	2.3 km	MPC · JPL
812768	2005 VT_{1}	—	October 25, 2005	Catalina	CSS	·	1.6 km	MPC · JPL
812769	2005 VO_{5}	—	November 9, 2005	Siding Spring	SSS	APO · PHA	370 m	MPC · JPL
812770	2005 VE_{10}	—	November 2, 2005	Mount Lemmon	Mount Lemmon Survey	NYS	830 m	MPC · JPL
812771	2005 VR_{12}	—	November 3, 2005	Mount Lemmon	Mount Lemmon Survey	(2076)	670 m	MPC · JPL
812772	2005 VL_{17}	—	October 31, 2005	Kitt Peak	Spacewatch	H	400 m	MPC · JPL
812773	2005 VY_{21}	—	November 1, 2005	Kitt Peak	Spacewatch	·	1.0 km	MPC · JPL
812774	2005 VM_{27}	—	November 3, 2005	Mount Lemmon	Mount Lemmon Survey	·	870 m	MPC · JPL
812775	2005 VQ_{41}	—	November 4, 2005	Kitt Peak	Spacewatch	·	760 m	MPC · JPL
812776	2005 VN_{67}	—	November 5, 2005	Kitt Peak	Spacewatch	·	700 m	MPC · JPL
812777	2005 VH_{69}	—	November 4, 2005	Mount Lemmon	Mount Lemmon Survey	·	550 m	MPC · JPL
812778	2005 VT_{70}	—	November 3, 2005	Mount Lemmon	Mount Lemmon Survey	·	1.3 km	MPC · JPL
812779	2005 VV_{72}	—	November 6, 2005	Kitt Peak	Spacewatch	NYS	770 m	MPC · JPL
812780	2005 VZ_{84}	—	November 4, 2005	Kitt Peak	Spacewatch	·	1.1 km	MPC · JPL
812781	2005 VE_{88}	—	October 29, 2005	Kitt Peak	Spacewatch	·	590 m	MPC · JPL
812782	2005 VX_{113}	—	November 3, 2005	Mount Lemmon	Mount Lemmon Survey	DOR	1.6 km	MPC · JPL
812783	2005 VW_{126}	—	October 1, 2005	Mount Lemmon	Mount Lemmon Survey	·	1.5 km	MPC · JPL
812784	2005 VK_{144}	—	September 16, 2012	Kitt Peak	Spacewatch	·	660 m	MPC · JPL
812785	2005 VL_{145}	—	March 18, 2018	Haleakala	Pan-STARRS 1	ERI	1.2 km	MPC · JPL
812786	2005 VU_{145}	—	November 3, 2005	Catalina	CSS	H	420 m	MPC · JPL
812787	2005 VJ_{146}	—	January 14, 2015	Haleakala	Pan-STARRS 1	·	1.5 km	MPC · JPL
812788	2005 VM_{146}	—	August 14, 2015	Haleakala	Pan-STARRS 1	·	690 m	MPC · JPL
812789	2005 VA_{147}	—	November 3, 2005	Mount Lemmon	Mount Lemmon Survey	·	1.7 km	MPC · JPL
812790	2005 VN_{148}	—	November 11, 2016	Mount Lemmon	Mount Lemmon Survey	·	830 m	MPC · JPL
812791	2005 VF_{149}	—	February 23, 2007	Mount Lemmon	Mount Lemmon Survey	·	790 m	MPC · JPL
812792	2005 VP_{150}	—	January 21, 2014	Mount Lemmon	Mount Lemmon Survey	·	780 m	MPC · JPL
812793	2005 VW_{150}	—	November 1, 2005	Kitt Peak	Spacewatch	·	770 m	MPC · JPL
812794	2005 VP_{151}	—	November 6, 2005	Mount Lemmon	Mount Lemmon Survey	H	410 m	MPC · JPL
812795	2005 VL_{152}	—	November 4, 2005	Mount Lemmon	Mount Lemmon Survey	T_{j} (2.97) · 3:2	4.0 km	MPC · JPL
812796	2005 VV_{152}	—	November 5, 2005	Kitt Peak	Spacewatch	EOS	1.3 km	MPC · JPL
812797	2005 VY_{152}	—	November 6, 2005	Kitt Peak	Spacewatch	H	340 m	MPC · JPL
812798	2005 VD_{153}	—	November 1, 2005	Kitt Peak	Spacewatch	·	1.3 km	MPC · JPL
812799	2005 VE_{153}	—	November 6, 2005	Mount Lemmon	Mount Lemmon Survey	·	770 m	MPC · JPL
812800	2005 VL_{153}	—	November 6, 2005	Kitt Peak	Spacewatch	·	930 m	MPC · JPL

== 812801–812900 ==
back to top

Designation			Discovery			Properties		Ref
Permanent	Provisional	Named after	Date	Site	Discoverer(s)	Category	Diam.	Ref
812801	2005 VF_{155}	—	October 1, 2005	Mount Lemmon	Mount Lemmon Survey	·	2.3 km	MPC · JPL
812802	2005 VG_{155}	—	November 4, 2005	Kitt Peak	Spacewatch	·	2.0 km	MPC · JPL
812803	2005 VP_{155}	—	November 1, 2005	Kitt Peak	Spacewatch	EOS	1.3 km	MPC · JPL
812804	2005 VS_{156}	—	November 7, 2005	Mauna Kea	A. Boattini	·	790 m	MPC · JPL
812805	2005 VF_{158}	—	November 3, 2005	Mount Lemmon	Mount Lemmon Survey	·	2.1 km	MPC · JPL
812806	2005 WM_{23}	—	October 28, 2005	Mount Lemmon	Mount Lemmon Survey	NYS	720 m	MPC · JPL
812807	2005 WH_{39}	—	November 25, 2005	Mount Lemmon	Mount Lemmon Survey	·	800 m	MPC · JPL
812808	2005 WC_{41}	—	November 21, 2005	Kitt Peak	Spacewatch	EUP	3.1 km	MPC · JPL
812809	2005 WX_{41}	—	November 12, 2005	Kitt Peak	Spacewatch	·	1.1 km	MPC · JPL
812810	2005 WM_{49}	—	November 5, 2005	Kitt Peak	Spacewatch	·	810 m	MPC · JPL
812811	2005 WV_{55}	—	November 28, 2005	Socorro	LINEAR	PHO	760 m	MPC · JPL
812812	2005 WU_{57}	—	November 25, 2005	Great Shefford	Birtwhistle, P.	·	2.1 km	MPC · JPL
812813	2005 WD_{60}	—	November 12, 2005	Kitt Peak	Spacewatch	·	610 m	MPC · JPL
812814	2005 WY_{83}	—	September 30, 2005	Mount Lemmon	Mount Lemmon Survey	·	460 m	MPC · JPL
812815	2005 WH_{97}	—	November 26, 2005	Mount Lemmon	Mount Lemmon Survey	·	730 m	MPC · JPL
812816	2005 WH_{102}	—	November 29, 2005	Mount Lemmon	Mount Lemmon Survey	·	2.0 km	MPC · JPL
812817	2005 WL_{106}	—	October 26, 2005	Kitt Peak	Spacewatch	·	2.3 km	MPC · JPL
812818	2005 WL_{107}	—	November 25, 2005	Mount Lemmon	Mount Lemmon Survey	·	570 m	MPC · JPL
812819	2005 WT_{108}	—	November 29, 2005	Mount Lemmon	Mount Lemmon Survey	·	2.6 km	MPC · JPL
812820	2005 WR_{167}	—	November 30, 2005	Kitt Peak	Spacewatch	V	450 m	MPC · JPL
812821	2005 WC_{173}	—	November 30, 2005	Kitt Peak	Spacewatch	·	820 m	MPC · JPL
812822	2005 WP_{176}	—	November 30, 2005	Kitt Peak	Spacewatch	HNS	970 m	MPC · JPL
812823	2005 WN_{215}	—	April 21, 2012	Mount Lemmon	Mount Lemmon Survey	H	310 m	MPC · JPL
812824	2005 WF_{218}	—	November 25, 2005	Kitt Peak	Spacewatch	NYS	770 m	MPC · JPL
812825	2005 WP_{218}	—	November 25, 2005	Kitt Peak	Spacewatch	·	830 m	MPC · JPL
812826	2005 WB_{220}	—	November 22, 2005	Kitt Peak	Spacewatch	·	1.5 km	MPC · JPL
812827	2005 WE_{220}	—	November 29, 2005	Kitt Peak	Spacewatch	·	1.4 km	MPC · JPL
812828	2005 WD_{221}	—	November 26, 2005	Mount Lemmon	Mount Lemmon Survey	·	2.6 km	MPC · JPL
812829	2005 XA_{7}	—	November 10, 2005	Mount Lemmon	Mount Lemmon Survey	·	780 m	MPC · JPL
812830	2005 XP_{19}	—	November 6, 2005	Mount Lemmon	Mount Lemmon Survey	·	490 m	MPC · JPL
812831	2005 XM_{37}	—	December 4, 2005	Kitt Peak	Spacewatch	BRA	1.1 km	MPC · JPL
812832	2005 XX_{44}	—	December 2, 2005	Kitt Peak	Spacewatch	·	890 m	MPC · JPL
812833	2005 XD_{49}	—	December 2, 2005	Kitt Peak	Spacewatch	·	680 m	MPC · JPL
812834	2005 XX_{53}	—	December 1, 2005	Socorro	LINEAR	·	1.3 km	MPC · JPL
812835	2005 XJ_{60}	—	November 25, 2005	Kitt Peak	Spacewatch	H	400 m	MPC · JPL
812836	2005 XB_{69}	—	December 6, 2005	Kitt Peak	Spacewatch	·	960 m	MPC · JPL
812837	2005 XB_{81}	—	December 7, 2005	Kitt Peak	Spacewatch	·	2.0 km	MPC · JPL
812838	2005 XR_{93}	—	December 1, 2005	Kitt Peak	L. H. Wasserman, R. L. Millis	·	520 m	MPC · JPL
812839	2005 XS_{102}	—	December 1, 2005	Kitt Peak	L. H. Wasserman, R. L. Millis	·	2.5 km	MPC · JPL
812840	2005 XA_{104}	—	December 1, 2005	Kitt Peak	L. H. Wasserman, R. L. Millis	·	2.3 km	MPC · JPL
812841	2005 XR_{104}	—	December 1, 2005	Kitt Peak	Wasserman, L. H., Millis, R. L.	·	1.2 km	MPC · JPL
812842	2005 XN_{119}	—	December 5, 2005	Mount Lemmon	Mount Lemmon Survey	ERI	1.1 km	MPC · JPL
812843	2005 XD_{120}	—	December 5, 2005	Mount Lemmon	Mount Lemmon Survey	·	1.1 km	MPC · JPL
812844	2005 XQ_{122}	—	December 6, 2005	Kitt Peak	Spacewatch	·	890 m	MPC · JPL
812845	2005 XY_{123}	—	November 24, 2009	Kitt Peak	Spacewatch	·	970 m	MPC · JPL
812846	2005 XA_{124}	—	February 25, 2015	Haleakala	Pan-STARRS 1	·	860 m	MPC · JPL
812847	2005 XN_{124}	—	December 6, 2012	Mount Lemmon	Mount Lemmon Survey	NYS	630 m	MPC · JPL
812848	2005 XK_{126}	—	August 9, 2015	Haleakala	Pan-STARRS 2	·	950 m	MPC · JPL
812849	2005 XY_{126}	—	September 4, 2008	Kitt Peak	Spacewatch	·	1.0 km	MPC · JPL
812850	2005 XG_{129}	—	August 21, 2015	Haleakala	Pan-STARRS 1	·	570 m	MPC · JPL
812851	2005 XR_{129}	—	October 28, 2016	Haleakala	Pan-STARRS 1	·	900 m	MPC · JPL
812852	2005 XL_{131}	—	March 13, 2010	Mount Lemmon	Mount Lemmon Survey	·	490 m	MPC · JPL
812853	2005 XU_{131}	—	September 17, 2012	Mount Lemmon	Mount Lemmon Survey	·	760 m	MPC · JPL
812854	2005 XX_{131}	—	October 9, 2008	Mount Lemmon	Mount Lemmon Survey	·	620 m	MPC · JPL
812855	2005 XK_{134}	—	December 2, 2005	Kitt Peak	Spacewatch	V	430 m	MPC · JPL
812856	2005 XN_{134}	—	December 5, 2005	Mount Lemmon	Mount Lemmon Survey	V	490 m	MPC · JPL
812857	2005 XY_{134}	—	December 1, 2005	Kitt Peak	Spacewatch	T_{j} (2.99) · (895)	2.6 km	MPC · JPL
812858	2005 XL_{136}	—	December 7, 2005	Kitt Peak	Spacewatch	(5)	720 m	MPC · JPL
812859	2005 YN_{9}	—	November 26, 2005	Mount Lemmon	Mount Lemmon Survey	·	910 m	MPC · JPL
812860	2005 YW_{14}	—	December 22, 2005	Kitt Peak	Spacewatch	H	450 m	MPC · JPL
812861	2005 YO_{24}	—	December 24, 2005	Kitt Peak	Spacewatch	·	650 m	MPC · JPL
812862	2005 YC_{64}	—	December 24, 2005	Kitt Peak	Spacewatch	·	3.0 km	MPC · JPL
812863	2005 YM_{72}	—	December 24, 2005	Kitt Peak	Spacewatch	·	730 m	MPC · JPL
812864	2005 YV_{91}	—	December 26, 2005	Kitt Peak	Spacewatch	H	360 m	MPC · JPL
812865	2005 YD_{99}	—	December 28, 2005	Mount Lemmon	Mount Lemmon Survey	·	750 m	MPC · JPL
812866	2005 YK_{101}	—	December 25, 2005	Kitt Peak	Spacewatch	·	750 m	MPC · JPL
812867	2005 YO_{112}	—	December 25, 2005	Mount Lemmon	Mount Lemmon Survey	·	520 m	MPC · JPL
812868	2005 YS_{119}	—	November 1, 2005	Mount Lemmon	Mount Lemmon Survey	·	1.5 km	MPC · JPL
812869	2005 YA_{142}	—	December 28, 2005	Mount Lemmon	Mount Lemmon Survey	·	370 m	MPC · JPL
812870	2005 YR_{158}	—	December 27, 2005	Kitt Peak	Spacewatch	·	1.3 km	MPC · JPL
812871	2005 YN_{183}	—	December 27, 2005	Kitt Peak	Spacewatch	·	1.0 km	MPC · JPL
812872	2005 YS_{196}	—	December 24, 2005	Kitt Peak	Spacewatch	·	450 m	MPC · JPL
812873	2005 YD_{214}	—	December 7, 2005	Catalina	CSS	(116763)	1.4 km	MPC · JPL
812874	2005 YJ_{223}	—	December 24, 2005	Kitt Peak	Spacewatch	EUN	1 km	MPC · JPL
812875	2005 YZ_{228}	—	December 25, 2005	Kitt Peak	Spacewatch	·	840 m	MPC · JPL
812876	2005 YC_{240}	—	December 29, 2005	Kitt Peak	Spacewatch	·	2.2 km	MPC · JPL
812877	2005 YM_{249}	—	December 28, 2005	Kitt Peak	Spacewatch	·	900 m	MPC · JPL
812878	2005 YK_{254}	—	December 30, 2005	Kitt Peak	Spacewatch	·	2.2 km	MPC · JPL
812879	2005 YO_{279}	—	December 25, 2005	Mount Lemmon	Mount Lemmon Survey	·	740 m	MPC · JPL
812880	2005 YW_{281}	—	December 8, 2005	Kitt Peak	Spacewatch	·	830 m	MPC · JPL
812881	2005 YJ_{285}	—	December 29, 2005	Kitt Peak	Spacewatch	·	450 m	MPC · JPL
812882	2005 YB_{294}	—	October 22, 2009	Mount Lemmon	Mount Lemmon Survey	·	1.1 km	MPC · JPL
812883	2005 YH_{294}	—	August 13, 2012	Siding Spring	SSS	·	930 m	MPC · JPL
812884	2005 YC_{295}	—	December 25, 2005	Kitt Peak	Spacewatch	·	500 m	MPC · JPL
812885	2005 YL_{298}	—	October 15, 2012	Haleakala	Pan-STARRS 1	V	450 m	MPC · JPL
812886	2005 YQ_{300}	—	December 28, 2005	Kitt Peak	Spacewatch	·	1.1 km	MPC · JPL
812887	2005 YP_{301}	—	December 25, 2005	Kitt Peak	Spacewatch	·	850 m	MPC · JPL
812888	2006 AT_{54}	—	January 5, 2006	Kitt Peak	Spacewatch	·	1.0 km	MPC · JPL
812889	2006 AS_{89}	—	January 5, 2006	Kitt Peak	Spacewatch	MAS	530 m	MPC · JPL
812890	2006 AM_{90}	—	December 25, 2005	Mount Lemmon	Mount Lemmon Survey	·	2.7 km	MPC · JPL
812891	2006 AS_{91}	—	June 29, 2014	Haleakala	Pan-STARRS 1	·	2.2 km	MPC · JPL
812892	2006 AL_{109}	—	November 28, 2013	Nogales	M. Schwartz, P. R. Holvorcem	·	910 m	MPC · JPL
812893	2006 AT_{109}	—	July 28, 2011	Haleakala	Pan-STARRS 1	V	430 m	MPC · JPL
812894	2006 AL_{110}	—	January 7, 2006	Kitt Peak	Spacewatch	·	2.0 km	MPC · JPL
812895	2006 AA_{112}	—	January 7, 2006	Mount Lemmon	Mount Lemmon Survey	·	1.1 km	MPC · JPL
812896	2006 AJ_{112}	—	August 26, 2016	Haleakala	Pan-STARRS 1	MAR	730 m	MPC · JPL
812897	2006 AP_{112}	—	July 2, 2000	Kitt Peak	Spacewatch	·	1.2 km	MPC · JPL
812898	2006 AF_{113}	—	March 10, 2014	Kitt Peak	Spacewatch	·	950 m	MPC · JPL
812899	2006 AQ_{113}	—	July 19, 2015	Haleakala	Pan-STARRS 1	CLA	1.3 km	MPC · JPL
812900	2006 AM_{117}	—	January 8, 2006	Mount Lemmon	Mount Lemmon Survey	·	460 m	MPC · JPL

== 812901–813000 ==
back to top

Designation			Discovery			Properties		Ref
Permanent	Provisional	Named after	Date	Site	Discoverer(s)	Category	Diam.	Ref
812901	2006 AU_{117}	—	January 4, 2006	Mount Lemmon	Mount Lemmon Survey	·	1.3 km	MPC · JPL
812902	2006 BZ_{20}	—	January 22, 2006	Mount Lemmon	Mount Lemmon Survey	·	850 m	MPC · JPL
812903	2006 BV_{24}	—	January 23, 2006	Mount Lemmon	Mount Lemmon Survey	·	1.5 km	MPC · JPL
812904	2006 BY_{27}	—	January 8, 2006	Kitt Peak	Spacewatch	·	3.2 km	MPC · JPL
812905	2006 BZ_{28}	—	January 23, 2006	Kitt Peak	Spacewatch	H	370 m	MPC · JPL
812906	2006 BR_{36}	—	January 23, 2006	Kitt Peak	Spacewatch	·	2.2 km	MPC · JPL
812907	2006 BV_{36}	—	January 23, 2006	Kitt Peak	Spacewatch	H	440 m	MPC · JPL
812908	2006 BM_{39}	—	December 28, 2005	Mount Lemmon	Mount Lemmon Survey	MAS	540 m	MPC · JPL
812909	2006 BE_{50}	—	January 25, 2006	Kitt Peak	Spacewatch	·	770 m	MPC · JPL
812910	2006 BV_{62}	—	January 20, 2006	Kitt Peak	Spacewatch	·	1.4 km	MPC · JPL
812911	2006 BX_{65}	—	January 23, 2006	Kitt Peak	Spacewatch	·	830 m	MPC · JPL
812912	2006 BS_{79}	—	January 23, 2006	Kitt Peak	Spacewatch	(5)	770 m	MPC · JPL
812913	2006 BP_{81}	—	January 23, 2006	Kitt Peak	Spacewatch	EUN	1.0 km	MPC · JPL
812914	2006 BG_{88}	—	January 25, 2006	Kitt Peak	Spacewatch	·	780 m	MPC · JPL
812915	2006 BK_{92}	—	January 6, 2006	Kitt Peak	Spacewatch	MAS	510 m	MPC · JPL
812916	2006 BJ_{97}	—	January 26, 2006	Mount Lemmon	Mount Lemmon Survey	·	990 m	MPC · JPL
812917	2006 BN_{97}	—	January 27, 2006	Mount Lemmon	Mount Lemmon Survey	TIR	1.8 km	MPC · JPL
812918	2006 BW_{104}	—	January 25, 2006	Kitt Peak	Spacewatch	MAS	590 m	MPC · JPL
812919	2006 BB_{105}	—	January 10, 2006	Mount Lemmon	Mount Lemmon Survey	·	870 m	MPC · JPL
812920	2006 BB_{106}	—	January 25, 2006	Kitt Peak	Spacewatch	·	850 m	MPC · JPL
812921	2006 BG_{117}	—	January 26, 2006	Kitt Peak	Spacewatch	·	860 m	MPC · JPL
812922	2006 BT_{118}	—	January 26, 2006	Kitt Peak	Spacewatch	EUN	980 m	MPC · JPL
812923	2006 BA_{122}	—	November 7, 2005	Mauna Kea	A. Boattini	·	650 m	MPC · JPL
812924	2006 BU_{124}	—	January 26, 2006	Kitt Peak	Spacewatch	·	1.4 km	MPC · JPL
812925	2006 BD_{127}	—	January 26, 2006	Kitt Peak	Spacewatch	H	320 m	MPC · JPL
812926	2006 BR_{141}	—	January 25, 2006	Kitt Peak	Spacewatch	3:2 · SHU	4.0 km	MPC · JPL
812927	2006 BF_{170}	—	January 27, 2006	Kitt Peak	Spacewatch	V	430 m	MPC · JPL
812928	2006 BU_{171}	—	January 27, 2006	Kitt Peak	Spacewatch	·	930 m	MPC · JPL
812929	2006 BH_{173}	—	January 27, 2006	Kitt Peak	Spacewatch	·	1.1 km	MPC · JPL
812930	2006 BK_{177}	—	January 27, 2006	Kitt Peak	Spacewatch	·	920 m	MPC · JPL
812931	2006 BX_{177}	—	January 27, 2006	Mount Lemmon	Mount Lemmon Survey	MAS	490 m	MPC · JPL
812932	2006 BV_{184}	—	January 28, 2006	Mount Lemmon	Mount Lemmon Survey	3:2	3.3 km	MPC · JPL
812933	2006 BZ_{184}	—	January 28, 2006	Mount Lemmon	Mount Lemmon Survey	·	820 m	MPC · JPL
812934	2006 BJ_{199}	—	January 30, 2006	Kitt Peak	Spacewatch	·	830 m	MPC · JPL
812935	2006 BD_{201}	—	January 7, 2006	Kitt Peak	Spacewatch	·	1.0 km	MPC · JPL
812936	2006 BM_{221}	—	January 30, 2006	Kitt Peak	Spacewatch	EUN	870 m	MPC · JPL
812937	2006 BB_{228}	—	January 6, 2006	Mount Lemmon	Mount Lemmon Survey	H	440 m	MPC · JPL
812938	2006 BR_{229}	—	January 23, 2006	Kitt Peak	Spacewatch	·	840 m	MPC · JPL
812939	2006 BW_{234}	—	January 23, 2006	Kitt Peak	Spacewatch	HNS	770 m	MPC · JPL
812940	2006 BN_{235}	—	January 31, 2006	Kitt Peak	Spacewatch	·	1.5 km	MPC · JPL
812941	2006 BS_{236}	—	January 31, 2006	Kitt Peak	Spacewatch	(194)	1.3 km	MPC · JPL
812942	2006 BO_{237}	—	January 31, 2006	Kitt Peak	Spacewatch	·	780 m	MPC · JPL
812943	2006 BS_{244}	—	January 31, 2006	Kitt Peak	Spacewatch	·	1.0 km	MPC · JPL
812944	2006 BW_{253}	—	January 31, 2006	Kitt Peak	Spacewatch	·	2.1 km	MPC · JPL
812945	2006 BX_{258}	—	January 31, 2006	Kitt Peak	Spacewatch	·	810 m	MPC · JPL
812946	2006 BH_{273}	—	January 7, 2006	Kitt Peak	Spacewatch	MAS	570 m	MPC · JPL
812947	2006 BN_{289}	—	January 23, 2006	Kitt Peak	Spacewatch	·	1.3 km	MPC · JPL
812948	2006 BD_{290}	—	January 31, 2006	Kitt Peak	Spacewatch	·	760 m	MPC · JPL
812949	2006 BA_{291}	—	March 24, 2014	Haleakala	Pan-STARRS 1	·	1.0 km	MPC · JPL
812950	2006 BH_{292}	—	January 28, 2006	Mount Lemmon	Mount Lemmon Survey	NYS	920 m	MPC · JPL
812951	2006 BE_{297}	—	January 30, 2006	Kitt Peak	Spacewatch	MAS	530 m	MPC · JPL
812952	2006 BT_{298}	—	January 27, 2006	Kitt Peak	Spacewatch	·	460 m	MPC · JPL
812953	2006 BN_{303}	—	January 25, 2006	Kitt Peak	Spacewatch	·	790 m	MPC · JPL
812954	2006 BQ_{304}	—	January 31, 2006	Kitt Peak	Spacewatch	·	960 m	MPC · JPL
812955	2006 CH_{12}	—	February 1, 2006	Kitt Peak	Spacewatch	·	1.2 km	MPC · JPL
812956	2006 CB_{27}	—	February 2, 2006	Kitt Peak	Spacewatch	NYS	840 m	MPC · JPL
812957	2006 CE_{30}	—	February 2, 2006	Kitt Peak	Spacewatch	·	440 m	MPC · JPL
812958	2006 CX_{44}	—	February 7, 2006	Kitt Peak	Spacewatch	·	2.2 km	MPC · JPL
812959	2006 CG_{52}	—	January 22, 2006	Mount Lemmon	Mount Lemmon Survey	·	1.5 km	MPC · JPL
812960	2006 CG_{64}	—	February 2, 2006	Mauna Kea	P. A. Wiegert	·	1.1 km	MPC · JPL
812961	2006 CX_{84}	—	April 22, 2014	Catalina	CSS	·	1.2 km	MPC · JPL
812962	2006 CO_{86}	—	January 7, 2009	Kitt Peak	Spacewatch	·	560 m	MPC · JPL
812963	2006 CG_{88}	—	January 14, 2016	Haleakala	Pan-STARRS 1	·	520 m	MPC · JPL
812964	2006 CL_{89}	—	February 1, 2006	Kitt Peak	Spacewatch	·	2.4 km	MPC · JPL
812965	2006 CA_{90}	—	February 1, 2006	Kitt Peak	Spacewatch	NYS	840 m	MPC · JPL
812966	2006 CL_{90}	—	July 1, 2013	Haleakala	Pan-STARRS 1	·	760 m	MPC · JPL
812967	2006 DE_{7}	—	February 7, 2006	Mount Lemmon	Mount Lemmon Survey	LIX	2.7 km	MPC · JPL
812968	2006 DK_{19}	—	February 1, 2006	Kitt Peak	Spacewatch	·	880 m	MPC · JPL
812969	2006 DM_{48}	—	November 7, 2005	Mauna Kea	A. Boattini	NYS	670 m	MPC · JPL
812970	2006 DQ_{81}	—	February 24, 2006	Kitt Peak	Spacewatch	NYS	950 m	MPC · JPL
812971	2006 DX_{88}	—	February 24, 2006	Kitt Peak	Spacewatch	·	550 m	MPC · JPL
812972	2006 DP_{101}	—	February 25, 2006	Kitt Peak	Spacewatch	·	830 m	MPC · JPL
812973	2006 DU_{124}	—	February 24, 2006	Kitt Peak	Spacewatch	·	940 m	MPC · JPL
812974	2006 DP_{126}	—	February 1, 2006	Mount Lemmon	Mount Lemmon Survey	·	790 m	MPC · JPL
812975	2006 DX_{137}	—	February 25, 2006	Kitt Peak	Spacewatch	H	380 m	MPC · JPL
812976	2006 DV_{145}	—	February 25, 2006	Mount Lemmon	Mount Lemmon Survey	·	1.1 km	MPC · JPL
812977	2006 DD_{149}	—	February 25, 2006	Kitt Peak	Spacewatch	·	870 m	MPC · JPL
812978	2006 DQ_{159}	—	February 27, 2006	Mount Lemmon	Mount Lemmon Survey	H	350 m	MPC · JPL
812979	2006 DW_{163}	—	February 27, 2006	Mount Lemmon	Mount Lemmon Survey	·	720 m	MPC · JPL
812980	2006 DR_{164}	—	February 27, 2006	Kitt Peak	Spacewatch	·	940 m	MPC · JPL
812981	2006 DT_{165}	—	February 2, 2006	Bergisch Gladbach	W. Bickel	·	800 m	MPC · JPL
812982	2006 DP_{175}	—	February 27, 2006	Mount Lemmon	Mount Lemmon Survey	THM	1.3 km	MPC · JPL
812983	2006 DP_{176}	—	February 27, 2006	Mount Lemmon	Mount Lemmon Survey	MAS	580 m	MPC · JPL
812984	2006 DT_{193}	—	February 24, 2006	Kitt Peak	Spacewatch	HNS	870 m	MPC · JPL
812985	2006 DH_{207}	—	February 25, 2006	Kitt Peak	Spacewatch	NYS	900 m	MPC · JPL
812986	2006 DP_{215}	—	February 21, 2006	Mount Lemmon	Mount Lemmon Survey	·	840 m	MPC · JPL
812987	2006 DZ_{219}	—	January 3, 2016	Haleakala	Pan-STARRS 1	PHO	690 m	MPC · JPL
812988	2006 DD_{221}	—	October 6, 2008	Mount Lemmon	Mount Lemmon Survey	·	570 m	MPC · JPL
812989	2006 DJ_{222}	—	February 8, 2013	Haleakala	Pan-STARRS 1	·	750 m	MPC · JPL
812990	2006 DP_{224}	—	May 16, 2010	Kitt Peak	Spacewatch	·	860 m	MPC · JPL
812991	2006 DS_{224}	—	February 24, 2006	Mount Lemmon	Mount Lemmon Survey	·	880 m	MPC · JPL
812992	2006 EK_{3}	—	March 2, 2006	Kitt Peak	Spacewatch	MAS	560 m	MPC · JPL
812993	2006 EH_{16}	—	March 2, 2006	Kitt Peak	Spacewatch	MAS	540 m	MPC · JPL
812994	2006 EJ_{18}	—	March 2, 2006	Kitt Peak	Spacewatch	NYS	880 m	MPC · JPL
812995	2006 EU_{22}	—	March 3, 2006	Kitt Peak	Spacewatch	·	880 m	MPC · JPL
812996	2006 EB_{26}	—	January 30, 2006	Kitt Peak	Spacewatch	·	840 m	MPC · JPL
812997	2006 EC_{28}	—	March 3, 2006	Kitt Peak	Spacewatch	·	490 m	MPC · JPL
812998	2006 EE_{35}	—	March 3, 2006	Kitt Peak	Spacewatch	MAS	560 m	MPC · JPL
812999	2006 EV_{43}	—	March 5, 2006	Mount Lemmon	Mount Lemmon Survey	NYS	850 m	MPC · JPL
813000	2006 EK_{48}	—	February 2, 2006	Mount Lemmon	Mount Lemmon Survey	·	2.0 km	MPC · JPL

back to top
