= Comet Boattini =

Comet Boattini can refer to any comets discovered by the astronomer Andrea Boattini:

== Periodic comets ==
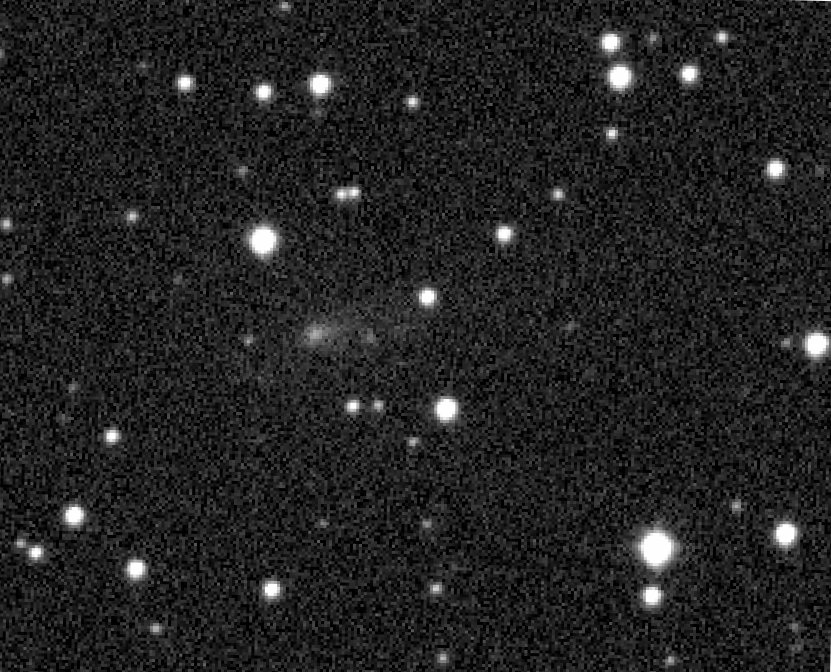
387P/Boattini

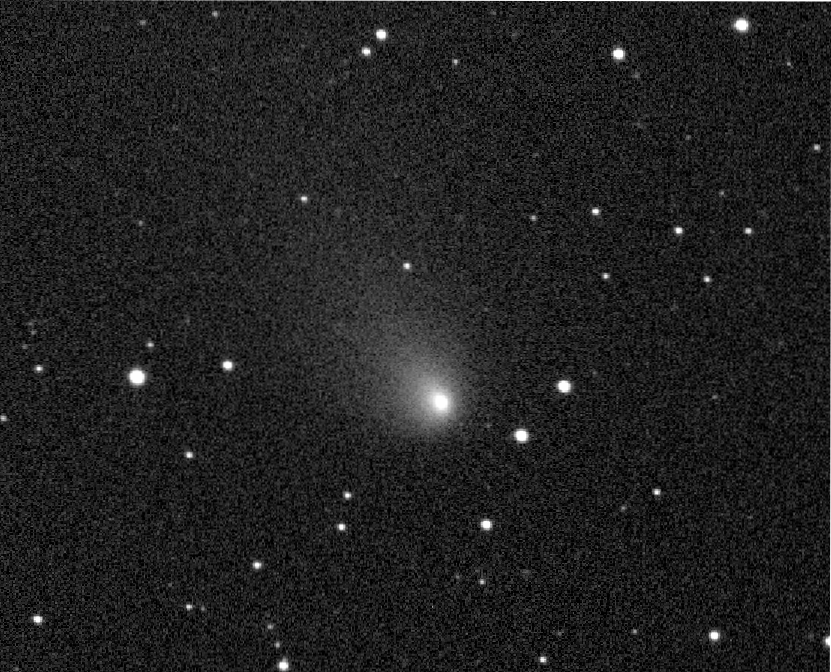
398P/Boattini

=== Jupiter-family comets ===
- 340P/Boattini
- 387P/Boattini
- 398P/Boattini
- 510P/Boattini
- P/2009 B1 (Boattini)
- P/2011 V1 (Boattini)
- P/2011 Y2 (Boattini)

=== Halley-type comets ===
- P/2008 O3 (Boattini)
- C/2011 Y3 (Boattini)

== Non-periodic comets ==
=== Near-parabolic comets ===
- C/2008 J1 (Boattini)
- C/2009 W2 (Boattini)
- C/2010 F1 (Boattini)
- C/2010 G1 (Boattini)
- C/2010 J1 (Boattini)

=== Parabolic and hyperbolic comets ===
- C/2007 W1 (Boattini)
- C/2008 S3 (Boattini)
- C/2009 P2 (Boattini)
- C/2010 U3 (Boattini), the hyperbolic comet with the longest known observation arc
- C/2011 L6 (Boattini)
- C/2013 F1 (Boattini)
- C/2013 H2 (Boattini)
- C/2013 J5 (Boattini)
- C/2013 V1 (Boattini)

== Others ==
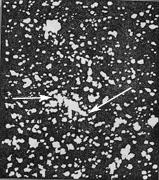
206P/Barnard–Boattini

"Comet Boattini" may also be an incomplete reference to a comet co-discovered with Andrea Boattini. These include:

- 206P/Barnard–Boattini, a previously lost comet rediscovered in 2008
- P/2011 JB_{15} (Spacewatch–Boattini)
