= 12848 Agostino =

Main-belt asteroid

Discovery
- Discovered by: A. Boattini
- Discovery site: Campo Imperatore
- Discovery date: 10 July 1997

Designations
- Named after: Agostino Boattini (discoverer's father)
- Alternative designations: 1997 NK_{10} · 1993 QQ_{10}
- Minor planet category: main-belt · Eunomia

Orbital characteristics
- Epoch 4 September 2017 (JD 2458000.5)
- Uncertainty parameter 0
- Observation arc: 66.88 yr (24,428 days)
- Aphelion: 2.8514 AU
- Perihelion: 2.3537 AU
- Semi-major axis: 2.6025 AU
- Eccentricity: 0.0956
- Orbital period (sidereal): 4.20 yr (1,534 days)
- Mean anomaly: 183.78°
- Mean motion: 0° 14^{m} 5.28^{s} / day
- Inclination: 15.066°
- Longitude of ascending node: 172.84°
- Argument of perihelion: 249.89°

Physical characteristics
- Dimensions: 4.55 km (calculated); 4.864±0.120 km
- Synodic rotation period: 6.3225±0.0052 h 6.3350±0.0258 h
- Geometric albedo: 0.21 (assumed); 0.225±0.033
- Spectral type: S
- Absolute magnitude (H): 13.6 · 13.54±0.32 · 13.8 · 13.537±0.006 (R) · 13.574±0.007 (R) · 14.02

12848 Agostino, provisional designation 1997 NK_{10}, is a stony Eunomia asteroid from the central region of the asteroid belt, approximately 5 kilometers in diameter.

The asteroid was discovered on 10 July 1997, by Italian astronomer Andrea Boattini at the Campo Imperatore Observatory in the Gran Sasso massif of central Italy. It was named after the father of the discoverer, Agostino Boattini.

== Orbit and classification ==
Agostino is a member of the Eunomia family, a large group of stony S-type asteroids and the most prominent family in the intermediate main-belt. It orbits the Sun at a distance of 2.4–2.9 AU once every 4 years and 2 months (1,534 days). Its orbit has an eccentricity of 0.10 and an inclination of 15° with respect to the ecliptic.

The body's observation arc begins 47 years prior to its official discovery observation with a precovery taken at Palomar Observatory in June 1950.

== Physical characteristics ==
Two rotational lightcurves of Agostino were obtained in the R-band from photometric observations by astronomers at the Palomar Transient Factory in August 2010, and February 2012, respectively. Lightcurve analysis gave a rotation period of 6.3350 and 6.3225 hours with a respective brightness variation of 0.51 and 0.84 in magnitude (U=2/2).

According to the NEOWISE mission of NASA's space-based Wide-field Infrared Survey Explorer, Agostino measures 4.9 kilometers in diameter and its surface has an albedo of 0.23. The Collaborative Asteroid Lightcurve Link assumes an albedo of 0.21 – derived from 15 Eunomia, the family's largest member and namesake – and calculates a diameter of 4.6 kilometers with an absolute magnitude of 14.02.

== Naming ==
This minor planet was named after Agostino Boattini (born 1932), the father of the discoverer. The approved naming citation was published by the Minor Planet Center on 9 May 2001 (M.P.C. 42673).
