= C/2007 W1 (Boattini) =

Hyperbolic comet

Discovery
- Discovered by: Andrea Boattini
- Discovery site: Mt. Lemmon Survey (G96)
- Discovery date: 20 November 2007

Designations
- Alternative designations: CK07W010

Orbital characteristics
- Epoch: 25 May 2008 (JD 2454611.5)
- Observation arc: 597 days (1.63 years)
- Number of observations: 1,639
- Aphelion: ~3,160 AU
- Perihelion: 0.84972 AU
- Semi-major axis: ~1,580 AU
- Eccentricity: 1.00015
- Orbital period: ~63,000 years
- Inclination: 9.8903°
- Longitude of ascending node: 334.53°
- Argument of periapsis: 306.55°
- Last perihelion: 24 June 2008
- Earth MOID: 0.0179 AU
- Jupiter MOID: 0.0160 AU

Physical characteristics
- Mean radius: 0.65±0.03 km
- Mass: 4.6×10^{11} kg
- Mean density: 440±60 kg/m^{3}
- Comet total magnitude (M1): 15.0
- Apparent magnitude: 5.0 (2008 apparition)

C/2007 W1 (Boattini) is a non-periodic comet discovered on 20 November 2007, by Andrea Boattini at the Mt. Lemmon Survey. At the peak the comet had an apparent magnitude around 5.

== Observational history ==
On 3 April 2008, when C/2007 W1 was 0.66 AU (99 million km) from the Earth and 1.7AU from the Sun, the coma (expanding tenuous dust atmosphere) of the comet was estimated to be as large as 10 arcminutes. This made the coma roughly 90,000 km (56,000 mi) in diameter. (Note: Math: 10' × 60" / 206265 × 0.66 AU × 149,597,870.7 km = 287,207 km)

On 30 April 2008, Alexandre Amorim reported that the comet was a magnitude 7.3 object as seen in 10 × 50 binoculars. By 8 May 2008, David Seargent noted that it brightened up to magnitude 6.4 in the naked eye. It was located within the constellation Pyxis on 20 May 2008.

== Physical characteristics ==
Spectroscopic observations in May 2008 reveal a dust production rate of approximately (0.38±0.02)×10^{26} mol/sec^{−1}, corresponding to a ratio of HCN relative to water by (0.32±0.02) %. This is nearly compatible to the HCN ratio measured at Hale–Bopp in 1997. In addition, emissions of OH, C_{2}, and CN were detected.

The nucleus is estimated to have an effective radius of 0.65 ± 0.03 km (0.404 ± 0.019 mi), with a total mass nearly 4.6×10^{26} kg.

== Orbit ==
On 12 June 2008, the comet passed within about 0.21005 AU (31,423,000 km; 19,525,000 mi) of the Earth. The comet came to perihelion on 24 June 2008 at a distance of 0.8497 AU (127.11 million km).

The comet has an observation arc of 597 days allowing a good estimate of the orbit. Using JPL Horizons, the barycentric orbital elements for epoch 2020-Jan-01 generate a semi-major axis of 1,582 AU, an apoapsis distance of 3,163 AU, and a period of approximately 63,000 years.

A 2022 study calculated that it hats a minimum orbit intersection distance of around 0.061 AU (9.1 million km) and 0.044 AU (6.6 million km) with 55637 Uni and (307762) 2003 VC1 respectively.

Before entering the planetary region, C/2007 W1 had a nearly hyperbolic trajectory, which indicated that it was a dynamically new comet originating from the outer Oort cloud, with a loosely bound chaotic orbit that was easily perturbed by passing stars.

== Meteor shower ==
A meteor shower known as the Daytime Craterids has been associated with C/2007 W1, thus becoming the first hyperbolic comet associated with a meteor shower. The meteor shower produced daytime outbursts in 2003 and 2009, with a Zenithal Hourly Rate of over 30 meteors per hour observed with radar.
