= Andrea Boattini =

Italian astronomer (born 1969)

Minor planets discovered: 609
see § List of discovered minor planets

Andrea Boattini (born 16 September 1969) is an Italian astronomer and a prolific discoverer of minor planets and comets.

== Career ==
After developing a growing interest in minor planets, he graduated in 1996 from the University of Bologna with a thesis on near-Earth objects (NEOs). He is involved in various projects related to NEO follow-up and search programs, with special interest in the NEO class known as Atens.

He currently works at the Lunar and Planetary Laboratory, University of Arizona after many years spent at the Consiglio Nazionale delle Ricerche (CNR, National Research Council) and the Astronomical Observatory in Rome. He worked for the Catalina Sky Survey project from 2007 to 2014, in Tucson, Arizona (USA). Meanwhile, he discovered the active comets C/2007 W1 (Boattini), C/2008 J1 (Boattini), C/2008 S3 (Boattini), C/2009 P2 (Boattini), C/2009 W2 (Boattini), C/2010 F1 (Boattini), C/2010 G1 (Boattini) as well as the most distant discovery of an inbound active comet, C/2010 U3 (Boattini). He also accidentally recovered 206P/Barnard-Boattini from the Mount Lemmon Survey (also see lost comet).

== Honors ==
Asteroid 8925 Boattini is named in his honour. The official naming citation was published by the Minor Planet Center (MPC) on 2 February 1999 (M.P.C. 33793).

== List of discovered minor planets ==
Andrea Boattini is credited by the MPC with the discovery of hundreds of minor planets made between 1977 (see following comment) and 2006.

The minor planet (48381) 1977 SU_{3}, discovered at the Siding Spring Observatory on 17 September 1977, is credited by the MPC to Andrea Boattini and his older co-discoverer Giuseppe Forti (born 1939). However Boattini did not co-discover this asteroid on the day after his 8th birthday in 1977, but rather recovered the body from the original observations, referenced as MPS 18832, which were published by the MPC on 13 October 2000. He named the asteroids 12848 Agostino and 14973 Rossirosina, in honor of his father Agostino (born 1932) and his mother, Rosina Rossi Boattini (born 1934).

In addition to the officially discovered (i.e. numbered) minor planets, near-Earth asteroids 2007 WD5 and 2012 FC71, first observed by Boattini in 2007 and 2012, respectively. His co-discoverers are: ^{A} M. Tombelli, ^{B} V. Goretti, ^{C} A. Di Paola, ^{D} L. Tesi, ^{E} G. Forti, ^{F} G. D'Abramo, ^{G} F. Pedichini, ^{H} A. Caronia, ^{J} A. Di Clemente, ^{K} F. Bernardi, ^{L} V. Cecchini, ^{M} H. Scholl, ^{N} M. Mazzucato, ^{O} O. Hainaut, ^{P} G. Fagioli.

List of minor planets discovered by Andrea Boattini

Name	Discovery Date	Listing
6876 Beppeforti	5 September 1994	list^{[A]}
7141 Bettarini	12 March 1994	list^{[A]}
7196 Baroni	16 January 1994	list^{[A]}
7197 Pieroangela	16 January 1994	list^{[A]}
7198 Montelupo	16 January 1994	list^{[A]}
7437 Torricelli	12 March 1994	list^{[B]}
7481 San Marcello	11 August 1994	list^{[A]}
7499 L'Aquila	24 July 1996	list^{[C]}
7599 Munari	3 August 1994	list^{[A]}
7787 Annalaura	23 November 1994	list^{[D]}
7801 Goretti	12 April 1996	list^{[D]}
7957 Antonella	17 January 1994	list^{[A]}
8558 Hack	1 August 1995	list^{[D]}
9670 Magni	10 July 1997	list
9904 Mauratombelli	29 July 1997	list^{[D]}
10149 Cavagna	3 August 1994	list^{[A]}
10219 Penco	25 October 1997	list^{[D]}
10371 Gigli	27 February 1995	list^{[D]}
10584 Ferrini	14 April 1996	list^{[D]}
(10589) 1996 OM_{2}	23 July 1996	list^{[C]}
(10590) 1996 OP_{2}	24 July 1996	list^{[C]}
10642 Charmaine	19 January 1999	list^{[D]}
11595 Monsummano	23 May 1995	list^{[D]}
11605 Ranfagni	19 October 1995	list^{[D]}
11620 Susanagordon	23 July 1996	list^{[C]}
11622 Samuele	9 September 1996	list^{[D]}
11667 Testa	19 October 1997	list^{[D]}
12399 Bartolini	19 July 1995	list^{[D]}
12848 Agostino	10 July 1997	list
12928 Nicolapozio	30 September 1999	list^{[E]}
13150 Paolotesi	23 March 1995	list^{[D]}
13250 Danieladucato	19 July 1998	list^{[D]}
13798 Cecchini	15 November 1998	list^{[D]}
14186 Virgiliofos	7 December 1998	list^{[D]}
14568 Zanotta	19 July 1998	list^{[A]}
14919 Robertohaver	6 August 1994	list^{[A]}
14973 Rossirosina	1 September 1997	list
15041 Paperetti	8 December 1998	list^{[D]}
(15098) 2000 AY_{2}	1 January 2000	list^{[E]}
15460 Manca	25 December 1998	list^{[D]}
(15478) 1999 CZ_{2}	7 February 1999	list^{[D]}
15817 Lucianotesi	28 August 1994	list^{[A]}
16154 Dabramo	1 January 2000	list^{[A]}
16672 Bedini	17 January 1994	list^{[A]}
16797 Wilkerson	7 February 1997	list^{[D]}
16879 Campai	24 January 1998	list^{[A]}
17056 Boschetti	6 April 1999	list^{[D]}
17077 Pampaloni	25 April 1999	list^{[A]}
18431 Stazzema	16 January 1994	list^{[A]}
18441 Cittadivinci	5 August 1994	list^{[A]}

Name	Discovery Date	Listing
18583 Francescopedani	7 December 1997	list^{[A]}
18631 Maurogherardini	27 February 1998	list^{[A]}
19224 Orosei	15 September 1993	list
19528 Delloro	4 April 1999	list^{[F]}
21269 Bechini	6 June 1996	list^{[D]}
(21291) 1996 VG_{6}	12 November 1996	list^{[G]}
(21337) 1997 BN_{9}	17 January 1997	list^{[C]}
22451 Tymothycoons	13 November 1996	list^{[C]}
22752 Sabrinamasiero	15 November 1998	list^{[A]}
(23589) 1995 UR_{6}	23 October 1995	list^{[D]}
24818 Menichelli	23 November 1994	list^{[D]}
24969 Lucafini	13 February 1998	list^{[D]}
25301 Ambrofogar	7 December 1998	list^{[A]}
25602 Ucaronia	2 January 2000	list^{[H]}
26177 Fabiodolfi	12 April 1996	list^{[D]}
26356 Aventini	26 December 1998	list^{[D]}
(26497) 2000 CS_{1}	3 February 2000	list^{[E]}
26498 Dinotina	4 February 2000	list^{[D]}
(26499) 2000 CX_{1}	4 February 2000	list^{[A]}
(26914) 1996 KC_{1}	20 May 1996	list^{[J]}
26954 Skadiang	25 June 1997	list
27130 Dipaola	8 December 1998	list^{[A]}
27269 Albinocarbognani	3 January 2000	list^{[A]}
(27364) 2000 EJ_{14}	3 March 2000	list^{[E]}
27977 Distratis	25 October 1997	list^{[D]}
27983 Bernardi	26 October 1997	list^{[A]}
28007 Galhassin	7 December 1997	list^{[A]}
29353 Manu	19 July 1995	list^{[D]}
29549 Sandrasbaragli	25 January 1998	list^{[A]}
29672 Salvo	12 December 1998	list^{[D]}
29705 Cialucy	26 December 1998	list^{[D]}
29706 Simonetta	25 December 1998	list^{[D]}
29869 Chiarabarbara	4 April 1999	list^{[F]}
30585 Firenze	14 August 2001	list^{[A]}
31414 Rotarysusa	14 January 1999	list^{[D]}
31458 Delrosso	15 February 1999	list^{[D]}
31605 Braschi	10 April 1999	list^{[A]}
32938 Ivanopaci	15 October 1995	list^{[D]}
33031 Paolofini	1 September 1997	list^{[A]}
33054 Eduardorossi	26 October 1997	list^{[A]}
33532 Gabriellacoli	18 April 1999	list^{[D]}
33823 Mariorigutti	3 February 2000	list^{[A]}
34696 Risoldi	21 July 2001	list^{[A]}
34716 Guzzo	14 August 2001	list^{[D]}
34717 Mirkovilli	14 August 2001	list^{[D]}
34718 Cantagalli	14 August 2001	list^{[D]}
35461 Mazzucato	26 February 1998	list^{[D]}
36446 Cinodapistoia	22 August 2000	list^{[D]}
37313 Paolocampaner	16 August 2001	list^{[A]}
38020 Hannadam	17 June 1998	list^{[D]}

Name	Discovery Date	Listing
39678 Ammannito	12 June 1996	list^{[D]}
39849 Giampieri	13 February 1998	list^{[D]}
43193 Secinaro	1 January 2000	list^{[D]}
43882 Maurivicoli	7 March 1995	list^{[D]}
(44715) 1999 TZ_{5}	2 October 1999	list^{[A]}
46644 Lagia	19 July 1995	list^{[D]}
(46673) 1996 OL_{2}	23 July 1996	list^{[C]}
46720 Pierostroppa	13 August 1997	list^{[D]}
(46815) 1998 MG_{3}	21 June 1998	list^{[D]}
47473 Lorenzopinna	1 January 2000	list^{[A]}
(48381) 1977 SU_{3}	17 September 1977	list^{[E]}
(49340) 1998 WG	16 November 1998	list^{[D]}
(50275) 2000 CU_{1}	4 February 2000	list^{[A]}
(51874) 2001 PZ_{28}	15 August 2001	list^{[A]}
(52426) 1994 PF	5 August 1994	list^{[A]}
54967 Millucci	15 August 2001	list^{[D]}
54983 Simone	16 August 2001	list^{[A]}
55196 Marchini	11 September 2001	list^{[D]}
(55828) 1995 UN_{6}	16 October 1995	list^{[D]}
(56073) 1998 YO_{10}	26 December 1998	list^{[A]}
(56361) 2000 CW_{1}	4 February 2000	list^{[A]}
(57076) 2001 OY_{16}	22 July 2001	list^{[A]}
57140 Gaddi	15 August 2001	list^{[D]}
(59114) 1998 XQ_{2}	7 December 1998	list^{[D]}
(59240) 1999 CY_{2}	7 February 1999	list
(59384) 1999 FH_{10}	22 March 1999	list^{[D]}
59417 Giocasilli	5 April 1999	list^{[D]}
(59421) 1999 GV_{3}	5 April 1999	list^{[F]}
60406 Albertosuci	3 February 2000	list^{[D]}
65001 Teodorescu	9 January 2002	list^{[K]}
(65845) 1997 AK_{22}	14 January 1997	list^{[C]}
(66000) 1998 OE_{1}	20 July 1998	list^{[A]}
(66250) 1999 GZ	4 April 1999	list^{[A]}
67070 Rinaldi	1 January 2000	list^{[D]}
69585 Albertoraugei	27 February 1998	list^{[A]}
(72841) 2001 HC_{32}	27 April 2001	list^{[A]}
73885 Kalaymoodley	1 March 1997	list
(75238) 1999 WC_{9}	29 November 1999	list^{[D]}
(75783) 2000 AZ_{204}	10 January 2000	list^{[L]}
(77464) 2001 HV_{16}	22 April 2001	list^{[D]}
78123 Dimare	10 July 2002	list^{[K]}
(79523) 1998 OC_{1}	20 July 1998	list^{[D]}
(79810) 1998 VL_{33}	15 November 1998	list^{[A]}
80008 Danielarhodes	4 April 1999	list^{[D]}
(82454) 2001 OT_{12}	21 July 2001	list^{[D]}
(82657) 2001 PA_{14}	14 August 2001	list^{[E]}
82927 Ferrucci	25 August 2001	list^{[D]}
(85819) 1998 XF_{9}	12 December 1998	list^{[A]}
(86376) 2000 AX_{4}	2 January 2000	list^{[D]}
(88371) 2001 PF_{15}	14 August 2001	list^{[A]}

Name	Discovery Date	Listing
(89734) 2002 AH	4 January 2002	list^{[A]}
89735 Tommei	4 January 2002	list^{[D]}
91214 Diclemente	23 December 1998	list^{[D]}
96217 Gronchi	14 September 1993	list^{[B]}
(99388) 2002 AL	4 January 2002	list^{[A]}
(100514) 1997 AB_{24}	15 January 1997	list^{[C]}
(100515) 1997 AM_{24}	15 January 1997	list^{[C]}
100726 Marcoiozzi	25 January 1998	list^{[A]}
(100730) 1998 CE_{2}	13 February 1998	list^{[D]}
(101493) 1998 XB_{3}	7 December 1998	list^{[A]}
(101534) 1998 YC_{10}	25 December 1998	list^{[D]}
(103248) 2000 AZ_{4}	2 January 2000	list^{[A]}
(103249) 2000 AA_{5}	3 January 2000	list^{[E]}
(108950) 2001 PS_{28}	14 August 2001	list^{[D]}
(108952) 2001 PD_{29}	15 August 2001	list^{[A]}
(109658) 2001 RZ_{10}	11 September 2001	list^{[D]}
117539 Celletti	17 February 2005	list^{[M]}
120040 Pagliarini	24 January 2003	list^{[M]}
(121017) 1999 BG_{4}	19 January 1999	list^{[A]}
121546 Straulino	5 November 1999	list^{[D]}
(121770) 2000 AV_{2}	1 January 2000	list^{[E]}
(126161) 2002 AK	4 January 2002	list^{[A]}
(137117) 1999 BK_{4}	19 January 1999	list^{[D]}
(139414) 2001 OR_{16}	20 July 2001	list^{[A]}
(143398) 2003 BE_{34}	25 January 2003	list^{[M]}
(145966) 1999 YM_{16}	30 December 1999	list^{[A]}
(146017) 2000 CX_{120}	5 February 2000	list^{[D]}
147693 Piccioni	11 February 2005	list^{[M]}
(148525) 2001 QG	16 August 2001	list^{[A]}
(150238) 1998 YG_{9}	23 December 1998	list^{[D]}
(150712) 2001 QD	16 August 2001	list^{[D]}
(153321) 2001 OW_{16}	21 July 2001	list^{[A]}
(153468) 2001 RO_{16}	12 September 2001	list^{[E]}
154991 Vinciguerra	17 January 2005	list^{[M]}
(155923) 2001 PB_{14}	14 August 2001	list^{[D]}
(155997) 2001 RP_{16}	12 September 2001	list^{[A]}
(156785) 2003 BH_{3}	24 January 2003	list^{[M]}
158623 Perali	24 January 2003	list^{[M]}
(165694) 2001 PQ_{28}	14 August 2001	list^{[A]}
167852 Maturana	17 February 2005	list^{[M]}
(173230) 1998 XM	6 December 1998	list^{[D]}
(175771) 1998 XO_{2}	7 December 1998	list^{[D]}
177659 Paolacel	9 February 2005	list^{[M]}
(180046) 2003 BB_{5}	24 January 2003	list^{[M]}
(180796) 2005 CB_{69}	14 February 2005	list^{[M]}
(181312) 2006 QV_{39}	24 August 2006	list^{[D]}
(181722) 1995 CU	1 February 1995	list^{[D]}
(181734) 1995 UQ_{6}	23 October 1995	list^{[D]}
(183445) 2003 BE_{3}	24 January 2003	list^{[M]}
(184290) 2005 CV_{61}	9 February 2005	list^{[M]}

Name	Discovery Date	Listing
(185990) 2001 OS_{12}	21 July 2001	list^{[D]}
(189087) 2001 PE_{15}	13 August 2001	list^{[D]}
(190730) 2001 PY_{13}	13 August 2001	list^{[A]}
(192573) 1998 XL	6 December 1998	list^{[D]}
(192927) 2000 AH_{6}	3 January 2000	list^{[E]}
(194837) 2002 AJ	4 January 2002	list^{[A]}
(202295) 2005 CL_{40}	9 February 2005	list^{[M]}
(202308) 2005 DN_{3}	18 February 2005	list^{[M]}
(208135) 2000 EF_{15}	2 March 2000	list^{[D]}
214180 Mabaglioni	9 February 2005	list^{[M]}
(223194) 2003 BP_{4}	24 January 2003	list^{[M]}
(241611) 1999 TO_{10}	8 October 1999	list^{[D]}
(242147) 2003 BH_{84}	25 January 2003	list^{[M]}
(242538) 2005 BW_{48}	17 January 2005	list^{[M]}
(245280) 2005 BK_{48}	17 January 2005	list^{[M]}
(246893) 1997 OB_{1}	29 July 1997	list^{[D]}
(247208) 2001 PN_{28}	13 August 2001	list^{[D]}
(253276) 2003 BO_{3}	23 January 2003	list^{[M]}
(253277) 2003 BL_{4}	25 January 2003	list^{[M]}
(254465) 2005 CC_{69}	9 February 2005	list^{[M]}
(254467) 2005 DJ_{2}	16 February 2005	list^{[M]}
(257513) 1997 AJ_{24}	15 January 1997	list^{[C]}
(269632) 2011 AK_{34}	24 October 2005	list
(273915) 2007 HG_{73}	24 October 2005	list
(275299) 2010 OH_{111}	31 October 2005	list
(277038) 2005 CK_{39}	9 February 2005	list^{[M]}
(277046) 2005 DO_{3}	16 February 2005	list^{[M]}
(279497) 2011 AK_{23}	24 October 2005	list
(279525) 2011 BM_{33}	24 October 2005	list
(287483) 2003 BS_{5}	24 January 2003	list^{[M]}
(289396) 2005 CB_{41}	9 February 2005	list^{[M]}
(289417) 2005 DF	17 February 2005	list^{[M]}
(289418) 2005 DP_{3}	17 February 2005	list^{[M]}
297314 Ilterracottaio	7 December 1998	list^{[A]}
(299072) 2005 DF_{3}	17 February 2005	list^{[M]}
(303470) 2005 CZ_{61}	13 February 2005	list^{[M]}
(306240) 2011 QV_{68}	9 February 2005	list^{[M]}
(310342) 2011 UW_{206}	30 September 2005	list
(312726) 2010 RW_{105}	23 January 2003	list^{[M]}
(313549) 2003 BD_{3}	24 January 2003	list^{[M]}
(313550) 2003 BT_{3}	23 January 2003	list^{[M]}
317000 Simonepastore	13 August 2001	list^{[A]}
(317387) 2002 OG_{36}	2 December 2005	list
(323126) 2003 BU_{4}	24 January 2003	list^{[M]}
(324244) 2006 BJ_{162}	7 October 2005	list
(326087) 2011 BM_{60}	3 December 2005	list
(329016) 2011 AO_{2}	24 October 2005	list
(329086) 2011 BQ_{53}	24 October 2005	list
(330117) 2005 XC_{107}	3 December 2005	list
(331287) 2011 DC_{30}	3 December 2005	list

Name	Discovery Date	Listing
(332196) 2006 DX_{78}	31 October 2005	list
(332938) 2011 CK_{90}	24 October 2005	list
(332993) 2011 GK_{9}	24 October 2005	list
(333028) 2011 SL_{29}	3 December 2005	list
(333069) 2011 US_{46}	7 October 2005	list
(333821) 2012 HJ_{49}	24 October 2005	list
(334068) 2001 PP_{28}	13 August 2001	list^{[D]}
(334680) 2003 BF_{3}	24 January 2003	list^{[M]}
(336987) 2011 KR_{47}	7 October 2005	list
(337429) 2001 RL_{16}	10 September 2001	list^{[D]}
(338401) 2003 BZ_{4}	24 January 2003	list^{[M]}
(342356) 2008 TB_{178}	24 October 2005	list
(343404) 2010 CC_{172}	24 October 2005	list
(347276) 2011 LF_{3}	3 December 2005	list
(347280) 2011 LR_{6}	7 November 2005	list
(348678) 2006 BB_{74}	7 October 2005	list
(348689) 2006 BD_{103}	24 October 2005	list
(350212) 2012 RD_{25}	24 October 2005	list
(352701) 2008 SE_{137}	3 December 2005	list
(354607) 2005 CT_{40}	9 February 2005	list^{[M]}
(354947) 2006 EU_{56}	7 October 2005	list
(356789) 2011 UL_{313}	16 February 2005	list^{[M]}
(361128) 2006 GG_{21}	3 December 2005	list
(362475) 2010 SA_{18}	16 February 2005	list^{[M]}
(365850) 2011 UY_{104}	24 October 2005	list
(365948) 2012 AV_{22}	14 February 2005	list^{[M]}
(366494) 2002 NL_{79}	7 November 2005	list
(368061) 2012 HZ_{63}	24 October 2005	list
(369864) 2012 KK_{17}	24 October 2005	list
(370849) 2005 CK_{40}	9 February 2005	list^{[M]}
(374535) 2006 AL_{104}	24 October 2005	list
(376312) 2011 GV_{28}	24 October 2005	list
(376572) 2013 PB_{14}	7 November 2005	list
(380416) 2003 BT_{4}	24 January 2003	list^{[M]}
(380657) 2005 DN_{1}	17 February 2005	list^{[M]}
(382216) 2012 PO_{38}	24 October 2005	list
(382262) 2012 TC_{114}	18 January 2005	list^{[M]}
400193 Castión	14 December 2006	list^{[N]}
(402221) 2005 CF_{39}	9 February 2005	list^{[M]}
(405190) 2003 BK_{4}	25 January 2003	list^{[M]}
(405191) 2003 BE_{5}	24 January 2003	list^{[M]}
(405514) 2005 CR_{40}	9 February 2005	list^{[M]}
(409383) 2005 DQ_{1}	17 February 2005	list^{[M]}
(427568) 2003 BG_{4}	23 January 2003	list^{[M]}
(455672) 2005 DE	18 February 2005	list^{[M]}
(455673) 2005 DG_{1}	17 February 2005	list^{[M]}
(487190) 2014 ON_{341}	17 February 2005	list
(497008) 2003 BG_{3}	24 January 2003	list^{[M]}
(513062) 2017 WS_{17}	7 November 2005	list
(535864) 2015 BT_{333}	2 December 2005	list

Name	Discovery Date	Listing
(540156) 2017 QB_{15}	2 December 2005	list
(540237) 2017 RV_{25}	7 November 2005	list
(540308) 2017 RZ_{81}	3 December 2005	list
(541152) 2017 EU_{9}	24 October 2005	list
(541529) 2011 RM_{7}	24 October 2005	list
(541999) 2012 HC_{12}	7 November 2005	list
(542212) 2013 AD_{81}	7 October 2005	list
(542293) 2013 BN_{39}	3 December 2005	list
(542326) 2013 CO_{16}	7 November 2005	list
(542329) 2013 CT_{18}	30 September 2005	list
(542372) 2013 CG_{66}	30 September 2005	list
(542398) 2013 CY_{94}	17 February 2005	list
(542425) 2013 CQ_{136}	31 October 2005	list
(542450) 2013 CF_{179}	3 December 2005	list
(542624) 2013 GM_{29}	31 October 2005	list
(542693) 2013 GR_{113}	2 December 2005	list
(543113) 2013 SX_{60}	7 November 2005	list
(543635) 2014 OJ_{144}	17 February 2005	list
(543767) 2014 PK_{32}	2 December 2005	list
(543931) 2014 QS_{327}	16 February 2005	list
(544739) 2014 WR_{352}	2 December 2005	list
(544954) 2014 WB_{524}	7 October 2005	list
(545402) 2011 HT_{62}	31 October 2005	list
(545438) 2011 JQ_{19}	3 December 2005	list
(546742) 2010 XR_{55}	7 November 2005	list
(547208) 2010 FT_{13}	2 December 2005	list
(547218) 2010 FR_{94}	3 December 2005	list
(548092) 2010 CP_{106}	7 November 2005	list
(548189) 2010 EO_{36}	31 October 2005	list
(548265) 2010 FW_{12}	7 November 2005	list
(548292) 2010 FU_{98}	7 November 2005	list
(548334) 2010 GJ_{114}	7 November 2005	list
(548337) 2010 GE_{123}	2 December 2005	list
(549135) 2011 CS_{116}	7 November 2005	list
(549166) 2011 DC_{48}	7 November 2005	list
(549356) 2011 GF_{87}	2 December 2005	list
(549420) 2011 HK_{71}	7 November 2005	list
(550587) 2012 QY_{25}	16 February 2005	list
(551110) 2012 WV_{4}	7 October 2005	list
(551250) 2013 AD_{56}	2 December 2005	list
(551753) 2013 JP_{36}	7 November 2005	list
(551933) 2013 QE_{1}	25 January 2003	list^{[O]}
(553037) 2011 AG_{44}	7 October 2005	list
(553251) 2011 FW_{51}	31 October 2005	list
(554155) 2012 QG_{6}	24 October 2005	list
(554769) 2013 AR_{112}	7 October 2005	list
(554813) 2013 CS_{33}	3 December 2005	list
(555114) 2013 RP_{3}	7 November 2005	list
(555138) 2013 RW_{67}	7 October 2005	list
(555197) 2013 SD_{82}	24 October 2005	list

Name	Discovery Date	Listing
(555283) 2013 UD_{20}	3 December 2005	list
(556039) 2014 JA_{39}	7 November 2005	list
(556087) 2014 KB_{18}	3 December 2005	list
(558331) 2015 AN_{65}	24 October 2005	list
(558568) 2015 BM_{6}	24 October 2005	list
(559046) 2015 BT_{398}	3 December 2005	list
(559136) 2015 BL_{474}	3 December 2005	list
(559351) 2015 CA_{31}	7 November 2005	list
(559372) 2015 CB_{40}	13 February 2005	list
(561081) 2015 PC_{230}	3 December 2005	list
(563723) 2016 EQ_{29}	24 October 2005	list
(564011) 2016 EC_{230}	7 October 2005	list
(564040) 2016 EM_{247}	3 December 2005	list
(564144) 2016 FH_{52}	7 October 2005	list
(566274) 2017 RO_{73}	7 November 2005	list
(568966) 2005 BJ_{52}	13 February 2005	list
(568990) 2005 DV_{3}	18 February 2005	list
(568997) 2005 EW_{134}	16 February 2005	list
(569627) 2005 UQ_{541}	24 October 2005	list
(569678) 2005 VW_{137}	7 November 2005	list
(569695) 2005 VF_{151}	7 November 2005	list
(569808) 2005 XO_{112}	3 December 2005	list
(569831) 2005 XY_{125}	3 December 2005	list
(569844) 2005 XT_{132}	2 December 2005	list
(570000) 2006 BN_{115}	7 November 2005	list
(570014) 2006 BW_{192}	24 October 2005	list
(570015) 2006 BY_{195}	7 November 2005	list
(570026) 2006 BF_{213}	30 September 2005	list
(570077) 2006 CC_{37}	24 October 2005	list
(570145) 2006 DV_{166}	3 December 2005	list
(570182) 2006 EC_{33}	3 December 2005	list
(570183) 2006 EZ_{36}	3 December 2005	list
(570295) 2006 KJ_{8}	16 February 2005	list
(572762) 2008 TE_{132}	3 December 2005	list
(574152) 2010 CG_{149}	2 December 2005	list
(574270) 2010 GD_{100}	16 February 2005	list
(575319) 2011 RT_{2}	31 October 2005	list
(575338) 2011 SO_{4}	2 December 2005	list
(576351) 2012 PX_{34}	7 October 2005	list
(576352) 2012 PV_{38}	24 October 2005	list
(576915) 2012 XU_{19}	23 January 2003	list^{[O]}
(577285) 2013 CA_{70}	24 October 2005	list
(577316) 2013 CZ_{118}	3 December 2005	list
(577320) 2013 CY_{125}	2 December 2005	list
(577825) 2013 RW_{53}	31 October 2005	list
(577859) 2013 SC_{3}	24 October 2005	list
(577891) 2013 SR_{67}	3 December 2005	list
(579568) 2014 UL_{12}	13 February 2005	list
(580000) 2015 AN_{121}	7 November 2005	list
(580156) 2015 BU_{60}	7 October 2005	list

Name	Discovery Date	Listing
(580437) 2015 BA_{441}	31 October 2005	list
(580454) 2015 BG_{459}	31 October 2005	list
(580579) 2015 CL_{27}	7 November 2005	list
(580795) 2015 DK_{143}	24 January 2003	list^{[O]}
(580865) 2015 DW_{219}	31 October 2005	list
(580912) 2015 EZ_{5}	24 October 2005	list
(580947) 2015 EE_{42}	24 October 2005	list
(580960) 2015 EN_{50}	7 November 2005	list
(580981) 2015 EH_{72}	7 November 2005	list
(581160) 2015 FM_{196}	7 November 2005	list
(582506) 2015 VC_{143}	7 October 2005	list
(582674) 2016 AT_{53}	24 October 2005	list
(582682) 2016 AQ_{77}	24 October 2005	list
(582791) 2016 BQ_{25}	18 February 2005	list
(582801) 2016 BJ_{52}	7 October 2005	list
(583734) 2016 NN_{75}	7 October 2005	list
(584171) 2016 TF_{36}	2 December 2005	list
(585192) 2017 VN_{17}	2 December 2005	list
(585421) 2018 LL_{6}	12 February 2005	list
(585707) 2019 AW_{34}	18 February 2005	list
(585973) 2000 CF_{114}	24 October 2005	list
(586367) 2003 BU_{3}	24 January 2003	list^{[O]}
(586878) 2005 CC_{39}	9 February 2005	list
(587063) 2005 SW_{277}	30 September 2005	list
(587064) 2005 SY_{277}	30 September 2005	list
(587079) 2005 SZ_{300}	30 September 2005	list
(587248) 2005 VB_{125}	7 November 2005	list
(587266) 2005 VS_{148}	7 November 2005	list
(587331) 2005 XH_{111}	3 December 2005	list
(587471) 2006 BU_{258}	24 October 2005	list
(587472) 2006 BC_{260}	7 November 2005	list
(587521) 2006 DB_{88}	3 December 2005	list
(587529) 2006 DO_{145}	31 October 2005	list
(587553) 2006 EK_{14}	3 December 2005	list
(588833) 2008 UT_{206}	2 December 2005	list
(589227) 2009 QY_{18}	7 November 2005	list
(589475) 2010 AP_{13}	7 November 2005	list
(589493) 2010 AG_{76}	24 October 2005	list
(589501) 2010 CN_{3}	24 October 2005	list
(589514) 2010 CO_{69}	24 October 2005	list
(589521) 2010 CZ_{93}	31 October 2005	list
(590211) 2011 UX_{11}	3 December 2005	list
(590709) 2012 RF_{26}	2 December 2005	list
(590759) 2012 TO_{107}	16 February 2005	list
(591215) 2013 EX_{90}	7 October 2005	list
(591266) 2013 GP_{13}	2 December 2005	list
(591767) 2014 EO_{20}	24 October 2005	list
(592224) 2014 QD_{268}	2 December 2005	list
(592227) 2014 QD_{302}	7 October 2005	list
(592241) 2014 QS_{419}	7 October 2005	list

Name	Discovery Date	Listing
(592310) 2014 SU_{252}	7 November 2005	list
(592501) 2014 XW_{27}	15 February 2005	list
(592559) 2015 AX_{249}	16 February 2005	list
(592898) 2015 ET_{39}	7 October 2005	list
(592912) 2015 FO	16 February 2005	list
(592975) 2015 FX_{142}	31 October 2005	list
(593137) 2015 GD_{35}	3 December 2005	list
(595492) 2003 BN_{3}	24 January 2003	list
(595493) 2003 BR_{4}	24 January 2003	list
(596119) 2005 CH_{85}	13 February 2005	list
(596124) 2005 DO_{2}	16 February 2005	list
(596125) 2005 DZ_{3}	18 February 2005	list
(596370) 2005 SE_{298}	30 September 2005	list
(596477) 2005 UK_{505}	24 October 2005	list
(596530) 2005 VN_{147}	7 November 2005	list
(596706) 2006 BD_{112}	24 October 2005	list
(596720) 2006 BU_{190}	7 November 2005	list
(596738) 2006 BR_{259}	7 November 2005	list
(596791) 2006 DA_{81}	3 December 2005	list
(596802) 2006 DC_{147}	3 December 2005	list
(598572) 2008 VV_{13}	3 December 2005	list
(600360) 2011 UT_{322}	16 February 2005	list
(600649) 2012 DM_{38}	7 October 2005	list
(600782) 2012 JT_{63}	18 February 2005	list
(600895) 2012 SW_{48}	3 December 2005	list
(600905) 2012 TR	3 December 2005	list
(601037) 2012 UE_{69}	2 December 2005	list
(601038) 2012 UH_{70}	7 November 2005	list
(601575) 2013 GT_{98}	3 December 2005	list
(601975) 2013 YW_{151}	18 February 2005	list
(602002) 2014 AY_{46}	24 October 2005	list
(602997) 2014 UX_{171}	7 October 2005	list
(603519) 2015 DV_{234}	16 February 2005	list
(603729) 2015 FO_{334}	3 December 2005	list
(603858) 2015 HN_{35}	3 December 2005	list
(603977) 2015 HQ_{189}	31 October 2005	list
(603989) 2015 JX_{5}	7 October 2005	list
(605067) 2016 BH_{21}	3 December 2005	list
(605274) 2016 FZ_{49}	3 December 2005	list
(605414) 2016 HN_{7}	16 February 2005	list
(605718) 2016 SG_{54}	31 October 2005	list
(606077) 2017 FK_{133}	12 February 2005	list
(606292) 2017 ST_{64}	17 February 2005	list
(606303) 2017 SL_{81}	3 December 2005	list
(607337) 2000 RX_{108}	24 October 2005	list
(607645) 2002 CP_{321}	7 November 2005	list
(607866) 2002 QB_{97}	3 December 2005	list
(608065) 2003 BM_{5}	24 January 2003	list^{[O]}
(608303) 2003 SM_{425}	3 December 2005	list
(609491) 2005 EJ_{191}	16 February 2005	list

Name	Discovery Date	Listing
(609818) 2005 SB_{294}	30 September 2005	list
(609823) 2005 SX_{299}	30 September 2005	list
(609865) 2005 TE_{217}	7 October 2005	list
(609935) 2005 UG_{506}	24 October 2005	list
(609949) 2005 US_{537}	24 October 2005	list
(609954) 2005 UZ_{547}	31 October 2005	list
(610005) 2005 VP_{147}	7 November 2005	list
(610006) 2005 VY_{147}	7 November 2005	list
(610012) 2005 VT_{152}	7 November 2005	list
(610116) 2005 XU_{104}	7 October 2005	list
(610120) 2005 XB_{111}	3 December 2005	list
(610121) 2005 XC_{111}	3 December 2005	list
(610129) 2005 XG_{121}	2 December 2005	list
(610132) 2005 XD_{122}	3 December 2005	list
(610411) 2006 BL_{111}	7 October 2005	list
(610457) 2006 BC_{203}	24 October 2005	list
(610469) 2006 BZ_{223}	7 November 2005	list
(610479) 2006 BT_{240}	24 October 2005	list
(610484) 2006 BL_{244}	24 October 2005	list
(610487) 2006 BK_{252}	24 October 2005	list
(610550) 2006 CZ_{7}	7 November 2005	list
(610631) 2006 DS_{111}	24 October 2005	list
(610693) 2006 EX_{8}	3 December 2005	list
(610708) 2006 EB_{34}	3 December 2005	list
(610721) 2006 EY_{57}	24 October 2005	list
(610722) 2006 EX_{58}	2 December 2005	list
(610762) 2006 FA_{31}	31 October 2005	list
(610765) 2006 FC_{39}	3 December 2005	list
(611474) 2006 WV_{159}	24 January 2003	list^{[O]}
(611876) 2007 HN_{37}	24 January 2003	list^{[O]}
(615380) 2003 BM_{3}	24 January 2003	list^{[O]}
(615381) 2003 BH_{5}	24 January 2003	list^{[O]}
(616014) 2005 CB_{83}	15 February 2005	list
(616020) 2005 DJ_{3}	18 February 2005	list
(616024) 2005 EY_{134}	16 February 2005	list
(616623) 2006 BJ_{182}	7 October 2005	list
(616647) 2006 CA_{40}	24 October 2005	list
(616666) 2006 DT_{172}	3 December 2005	list
(616737) 1999 TN_{340}	7 November 2005	list
(617616) 2005 TR_{213}	7 October 2005	list
(617693) 2005 UN_{534}	31 October 2005	list
(617707) 2005 UR_{547}	24 October 2005	list
(617778) 2005 XW_{106}	24 October 2005	list
(619871) 2006 DT_{97}	31 October 2005	list
(619876) 2006 DC_{149}	3 December 2005	list
(620392) 2003 BK_{5}	24 January 2003	list^{[O]}
(620658) 2005 TB_{200}	7 October 2005	list
(620741) 2006 GD_{45}	24 October 2005	list
(622553) 2014 JO_{41}	14 February 2005	list
(622880) 2014 WO_{358}	24 October 2005	list

Name	Discovery Date	Listing
(625083) 2005 GR_{194}	18 February 2005	list
(625269) 2005 SS_{300}	30 September 2005	list
(625421) 2005 UA_{552}	24 October 2005	list
(625620) 2006 DV_{44}	30 September 2005	list
(628748) 2016 AP_{58}	7 November 2005	list
(628790) 2016 CG_{160}	7 October 2005	list
(629665) 2003 BV_{3}	24 January 2003	list^{[O]}
(629666) 2003 BL_{5}	24 January 2003	list^{[O]}
(630101) 2004 YQ_{40}	2 December 2005	list
(630127) 2005 CW_{81}	9 February 2005	list
(630131) 2005 DM_{1}	17 February 2005	list
(630135) 2005 EC_{64}	16 February 2005	list
(630572) 2006 BL_{162}	7 October 2005	list
(630583) 2006 BO_{241}	24 October 2005	list
(630587) 2006 BY_{253}	7 November 2005	list
(630606) 2006 CU_{86}	7 October 2005	list
(630637) 2006 DE_{195}	24 October 2005	list
(631908) 2007 VV_{263}	14 February 2005	list
(632516) 2008 NH_{1}	24 October 2005	list
(633569) 2009 UL_{124}	3 December 2005	list
(633598) 2009 VU_{31}	7 November 2005	list
(633682) 2009 WX_{132}	7 November 2005	list
(633702) 2009 WU_{165}	3 December 2005	list
(633730) 2009 WU_{223}	7 November 2005	list
(634070) 2011 BZ_{5}	24 October 2005	list
(634077) 2011 BT_{34}	7 October 2005	list
(634184) 2011 EF_{37}	9 February 2005	list
(634409) 2011 QH_{74}	7 November 2005	list
(634540) 2011 UP_{290}	30 September 2005	list
(634691) 2012 FZ_{74}	9 February 2005	list
(634848) 2012 SR_{16}	7 November 2005	list
(635002) 2012 UG_{104}	3 December 2005	list
(635003) 2012 UK_{104}	24 January 2003	list^{[O]}
(635102) 2012 XV_{111}	31 October 2005	list
(635136) 2013 AT_{25}	30 September 2005	list
(635333) 2013 GU_{94}	3 December 2005	list
(635513) 2013 SG_{54}	3 December 2005	list
(635544) 2013 TL_{109}	15 February 2005	list
(636203) 2014 PL_{69}	30 September 2005	list
(636658) 2014 WB	9 February 2005	list
(636941) 2015 AC_{263}	24 October 2005	list
(636967) 2015 BG_{27}	3 December 2005	list
(637180) 2015 DC_{7}	30 September 2005	list
(637774) 2015 NV_{3}	7 October 2005	list
(637817) 2015 OM_{78}	3 December 2005	list
(638577) 2016 BQ_{57}	2 December 2005	list
(639170) 2016 UV_{54}	3 December 2005	list
(639299) 2017 BL_{80}	24 October 2005	list
(639387) 2017 DJ_{25}	7 October 2005	list
(639712) 2017 NW_{3}	24 October 2005	list

Name	Discovery Date	Listing
(640770) 2002 CE_{324}	3 December 2005	list
(641152) 2003 BX_{3}	24 January 2003	list^{[O]}
(641153) 2003 BC_{4}	24 January 2003	list^{[O]}
(642055) 2005 CX_{40}	9 February 2005	list
(642063) 2005 DQ_{4}	16 February 2005	list
(642556) 2005 SC_{294}	30 September 2005	list
(642884) 2005 US_{539}	24 October 2005	list
(642888) 2005 UW_{540}	24 October 2005	list
(642986) 2005 VA_{144}	7 November 2005	list
(643006) 2005 VM_{154}	7 November 2005	list
(643107) 2005 XP_{110}	3 December 2005	list
(643316) 2006 BR_{32}	24 October 2005	list
(643371) 2006 BO_{180}	24 October 2005	list
(643379) 2006 BX_{205}	24 October 2005	list
(643440) 2006 CC_{32}	24 October 2005	list
(643483) 2006 DO_{19}	7 November 2005	list
(643489) 2006 DZ_{60}	3 December 2005	list
(643523) 2006 DO_{180}	3 December 2005	list
(645357) 2007 RQ_{63}	2 December 2005	list
(647120) 2008 RD_{48}	24 October 2005	list
(647445) 2008 TF_{188}	24 October 2005	list
(647743) 2008 WB_{116}	3 December 2005	list
(648699) 2010 AK_{29}	31 October 2005	list
(648823) 2010 JM_{40}	7 October 2005	list
(649053) 2010 VN_{14}	24 January 2003	list^{[O]}
(649445) 2011 FJ_{123}	24 October 2005	list
(649514) 2011 HH_{46}	24 October 2005	list
(650492) 2012 PP_{27}	3 December 2005	list
(650718) 2012 TQ_{165}	14 February 2005	list
(651414) 2013 AB_{108}	7 November 2005	list
(652426) 2014 AR_{44}	24 October 2005	list
(653641) 2014 RF_{25}	24 October 2005	list
(653644) 2014 RK_{33}	24 October 2005	list
(653837) 2014 UW_{93}	24 January 2003	list^{[O]}
(654339) 2015 BR_{27}	3 December 2005	list
(654380) 2015 BA_{110}	24 October 2005	list
(654528) 2015 BY_{439}	3 December 2005	list
(654540) 2015 BT_{474}	7 November 2005	list
(654555) 2015 BO_{488}	7 November 2005	list
(654563) 2015 BY_{508}	24 October 2005	list
(654649) 2015 CZ_{64}	3 December 2005	list
(654694) 2015 DE_{89}	31 October 2005	list
(654725) 2015 DQ_{147}	7 October 2005	list
(655790) 2015 RG_{52}	2 December 2005	list
(656849) 2016 EP_{170}	7 November 2005	list
(659186) 2018 VT_{62}	30 September 2005	list
(660861) 2003 BL_{86}	25 January 2003	list^{[O]}
(661951) 2005 SA_{296}	30 September 2005	list
(661994) 2005 TJ_{198}	7 October 2005	list
(662190) 2005 VH_{140}	7 November 2005	list

Name	Discovery Date	Listing
(662195) 2005 VB_{146}	7 November 2005	list
(662266) 2005 XC_{110}	3 December 2005	list
(665503) 2009 QF_{35}	7 October 2005	list
(666265) 2010 CJ_{81}	3 December 2005	list
(666268) 2010 CD_{85}	3 December 2005	list
(666270) 2010 CU_{88}	7 November 2005	list
(666314) 2010 DR_{21}	31 October 2005	list
(667078) 2011 BH_{8}	24 October 2005	list
(667086) 2011 BC_{26}	24 October 2005	list
(667088) 2011 BO_{30}	31 October 2005	list
(667199) 2011 CJ_{51}	3 December 2005	list
(667235) 2011 DN_{19}	3 December 2005	list
(667447) 2011 HE_{87}	24 October 2005	list
(668708) 2012 FW_{32}	7 October 2005	list
(668994) 2012 QD_{47}	7 October 2005	list
(669789) 2013 CT_{44}	24 October 2005	list
(670001) 2013 EV_{73}	3 December 2005	list
(670067) 2013 FC_{12}	30 September 2005	list
(670439) 2013 RQ_{89}	18 February 2005	list
(670506) 2013 ST_{101}	3 December 2005	list
(670512) 2013 TN_{17}	24 October 2005	list
(670613) 2013 VR_{15}	24 October 2005	list
(670840) 2014 BG_{38}	3 December 2005	list
(670844) 2014 BM_{47}	24 October 2005	list
(670888) 2014 DH_{13}	16 February 2005	list
(670949) 2014 DJ_{151}	3 December 2005	list
(671659) 2014 OY_{133}	7 October 2005	list
(671792) 2014 PC_{9}	24 October 2005	list
(671895) 2014 QB_{98}	24 October 2005	list
(673277) 2015 BO_{302}	7 October 2005	list
(673709) 2015 FG_{107}	3 December 2005	list
(674063) 2015 KZ_{55}	16 February 2005	list
(674170) 2015 MH_{2}	24 October 2005	list
(674613) 2015 RH_{34}	7 November 2005	list
(674956) 2015 TG_{163}	24 October 2005	list
(675020) 2015 TO_{247}	31 October 2005	list
(675078) 2015 TW_{311}	24 October 2005	list
(675266) 2015 VJ_{72}	24 October 2005	list
(675549) 2015 XJ_{248}	7 October 2005	list
(675767) 2016 AD_{107}	31 October 2005	list
(676883) 2016 PV_{123}	3 December 2005	list
(677558) 2016 XD_{19}	24 October 2005	list
(677819) 2017 DO_{80}	24 October 2005	list
(678267) 2017 QM_{24}	7 October 2005	list
(679328) 2018 YK_{5}	24 October 2005	list
(679587) 2019 RL_{11}	3 December 2005	list
(680323) 2001 KC_{80}	3 December 2005	list
(681603) 2005 SH_{298}	30 September 2005	list
(681802) 2005 VD_{156}	7 November 2005	list
(682058) 2006 BN_{202}	7 October 2005	list

Name	Discovery Date	Listing
(682067) 2006 BM_{249}	7 November 2005	list
(682083) 2006 BR_{294}	7 November 2005	list
(682113) 2006 CF_{30}	24 October 2005	list
(682118) 2006 CM_{64}	24 January 2003	list^{[O]}
(682197) 2006 EB_{17}	24 October 2005	list
(684324) 2008 SO_{108}	7 October 2005	list
(686716) 2011 BQ_{104}	30 September 2005	list
(688954) 2013 BA_{62}	3 December 2005	list
(689085) 2013 CT_{171}	24 October 2005	list
(690233) 2014 DU_{39}	31 October 2005	list
(690972) 2014 OB_{19}	7 November 2005	list
(691265) 2014 OB_{382}	7 November 2005	list
(691822) 2014 RD_{5}	7 November 2005	list
(692110) 2014 TB_{42}	24 October 2005	list
(692283) 2014 WX_{91}	13 February 2005	list
(693239) 2015 FX_{139}	7 November 2005	list
(693911) 2015 OK_{87}	13 February 2005	list
(694662) 2015 TA_{135}	24 October 2005	list
(694698) 2015 TZ_{181}	3 December 2005	list
(695044) 2015 VH_{5}	30 September 2005	list
(695634) 2016 AP_{52}	7 October 2005	list
(697263) 2017 AB_{46}	24 October 2005	list
(697279) 2017 BM_{17}	30 September 2005	list
(697330) 2017 BD_{80}	7 November 2005	list
(697365) 2017 BK_{133}	7 October 2005	list
(697692) 2017 FK_{124}	2 December 2005	list
(697760) 2017 GS_{31}	3 December 2005	list
(698697) 2018 HU_{8}	3 December 2005	list
(698809) 2018 VN_{36}	3 December 2005	list
(701535) 2005 CZ_{38}	9 February 2005	list
(701536) 2005 CM_{40}	9 February 2005	list
(701537) 2005 CQ_{40}	9 February 2005	list^{[M]}
(701538) 2005 CZ_{40}	9 February 2005	list
(701557) 2005 DD_{2}	18 February 2005	list
(701875) 2005 SD_{294}	30 September 2005	list
(701883) 2005 SU_{301}	30 September 2005	list
(702016) 2005 UD_{536}	24 October 2005	list
(702062) 2005 VM_{156}	7 November 2005	list
(702239) 2006 BJ_{159}	7 November 2005	list
(702242) 2006 BW_{167}	7 October 2005	list
(702416) 2006 FW_{42}	31 October 2005	list
(702470) 2006 HJ_{132}	3 December 2005	list
(704646) 2008 SG_{77}	7 November 2005	list
(706492) 2010 EN_{2}	7 October 2005	list
(707066) 2011 BW	7 November 2005	list
(707228) 2011 CQ_{11}	24 October 2005	list
(707320) 2011 DC_{6}	2 December 2005	list
(707830) 2011 SU_{72}	7 November 2005	list
(708674) 2012 HH_{14}	24 October 2005	list
(709054) 2012 TO_{310}	7 October 2005	list

Name	Discovery Date	Listing
(710273) 2013 RO_{101}	9 February 2005	list
(711369) 2014 OE_{57}	3 December 2005	list
(711511) 2014 OR_{304}	7 October 2005	list
(711788) 2014 QU_{244}	7 October 2005	list
(712241) 2014 SC_{200}	7 November 2005	list
(712267) 2014 SR_{240}	7 November 2005	list
(713666) 2015 EB_{48}	7 November 2005	list
(715482) 2015 VQ_{157}	30 September 2005	list
(716182) 2016 AV_{266}	2 December 2005	list
(716305) 2016 BW_{127}	31 October 2005	list
(717873) 2017 BO_{78}	7 November 2005	list
(718095) 2017 DT_{56}	7 November 2005	list
(718164) 2017 DV_{104}	24 October 2005	list
(718220) 2017 EP_{9}	3 December 2005	list
(718311) 2017 FL_{44}	7 November 2005	list
(718839) 2017 UH_{35}	3 December 2005	list
(718926) 2017 XL_{40}	30 September 2005	list
(719859) 2021 GJ_{83}	3 December 2005	list
(720208) 2000 CW_{119}	3 December 2005	list
(721006) 2002 TY_{316}	24 January 2003	list^{[O]}
(721157) 2003 BK_{3}	24 January 2003	list^{[O]}
(722074) 2005 DU_{3}	16 February 2005	list
(722075) 2005 DG_{4}	18 February 2005	list
(722649) 2005 XL_{112}	3 December 2005	list
(722770) 2006 BH_{185}	7 October 2005	list
(722844) 2006 DQ_{26}	24 October 2005	list
(722845) 2006 DA_{40}	7 November 2005	list
(722865) 2006 DT_{125}	7 November 2005	list
(722870) 2006 DA_{146}	24 October 2005	list
(722878) 2006 DB_{166}	3 December 2005	list
(726606) 2010 BA_{11}	24 October 2005	list
(726798) 2010 BM_{134}	18 February 2005	list
(729042) 2011 AW_{8}	24 October 2005	list
(729697) 2011 MB_{3}	7 October 2005	list
(729768) 2011 QH_{22}	3 December 2005	list
(730151) 2011 WQ_{38}	15 February 2005	list^{[M]}
(730597) 2012 LH_{12}	31 October 2005	list
(730634) 2012 PD_{30}	24 October 2005	list
(730732) 2012 TL_{15}	31 October 2005	list
(731244) 2013 CZ_{57}	30 September 2005	list
(731476) 2013 GE_{9}	7 November 2005	list
(731851) 2013 SN_{48}	7 October 2005	list
(732076) 2013 WY_{68}	9 February 2005	list
(732550) 2014 GQ_{49}	7 November 2005	list
(732617) 2014 HM_{160}	24 October 2005	list
(732709) 2014 JQ_{77}	9 February 2005	list^{[M]}
(733130) 2014 PM_{31}	2 December 2005	list
(733281) 2014 QR_{269}	24 October 2005	list
(733439) 2014 RN_{41}	31 October 2005	list
(734062) 2014 WB_{314}	16 October 1995	list^{[D]}

Name	Discovery Date	Listing
(734403) 2015 AL_{74}	24 October 2005	list
(734423) 2015 AO_{111}	7 November 2005	list
(734561) 2015 BJ_{27}	3 December 2005	list
(734637) 2015 BR_{122}	6 January 2008	list
(734655) 2015 BW_{147}	7 October 2005	list
(735057) 2015 DF_{177}	30 September 2005	list
(735640) 2015 KR_{59}	24 October 2005	list
(736541) 2015 TZ_{291}	24 October 2005	list
(736808) 2015 XD_{132}	30 September 2005	list
(736828) 2015 XL_{178}	25 January 2003	list^{[O]}
(738810) 2017 BB_{100}	24 October 2005	list
(738866) 2017 CC_{13}	24 October 2005	list
(739075) 2017 FX_{36}	9 February 2005	list^{[M]}
(739110) 2017 FQ_{71}	7 November 2005	list
(739904) 2019 GL_{35}	7 November 2005	list
(740973) 2005 DT_{3}	18 February 2005	list
(741343) 2005 VU_{147}	7 November 2005	list
(741462) 2006 BN_{225}	7 November 2005	list
(741496) 2006 DG_{115}	3 December 2005	list
(741547) 2006 HT_{45}	31 October 2005	list
(747116) 2012 SA_{6}	25 January 2003	list^{[O]}
(748066) 2013 EL_{83}	3 December 2005	list
(748826) 2013 YK_{32}	24 October 2005	list
(748972) 2014 CX_{11}	24 October 2005	list
(749790) 2014 OL_{364}	30 September 2005	list
(755327) 2017 BJ_{220}	24 October 2005	list
(755374) 2017 DA_{15}	3 December 2005	list
(757329) 2003 BP_{3}	24 January 2003	list^{[O]}
(757330) 2003 BQ_{3}	24 January 2003	list^{[O]}
(757331) 2003 BS_{3}	24 January 2003	list^{[O]}
(757332) 2003 BV_{4}	24 January 2003	list^{[O]}
(757333) 2003 BT_{5}	24 January 2003	list^{[O]}
(760805) 2009 BP_{107}	18 February 2005	list^{[M]}
(762299) 2011 BV_{54}	3 December 2005	list
(763695) 2012 HH_{110}	30 September 2005	list
(765462) 2013 VW_{70}	24 October 2005	list
(766061) 2014 EC_{134}	3 June 2002	list
(767098) 2014 RN_{55}	2 December 2005	list
(769473) 2015 PN_{104}	7 November 2005	list
(769831) 2015 TD_{211}	24 October 2005	list
(772054) 2017 CO_{19}	31 October 2005	list
(772599) 2017 RJ_{126}	7 November 2005	list
(775112) 2006 DP_{166}	3 December 2005	list
(777759) 2009 HR_{82}	10 February 2005	list^{[M]}
(781135) 2013 CD_{190}	16 February 2005	list^{[M]}
(782189) 2014 AW_{10}	3 December 2005	list
(783602) 2014 SA_{356}	2 December 2005	list
(787582) 2016 FF_{31}	18 February 2005	list^{[M]}
(793685) 2005 CJ_{39}	9 February 2005	list^{[M]}
(794088) 2005 VJ_{152}	7 November 2005	list

Name	Discovery Date	Listing
(794252) 2006 EO_{7}	24 October 2005	list
(795738) 2008 SH_{231}	3 December 2005	list
(796592) 2010 CW_{94}	2 December 2005	list
(799768) 2013 TD_{151}	16 February 2005	list^{[M]}
(802010) 2015 AW_{93}	7 November 2005	list
(812675) 2005 TJ_{201}	7 October 2005	list
(812804) 2005 VS_{156}	7 November 2005	list
(812923) 2006 BA_{122}	7 November 2005	list
(812969) 2006 DM_{48}	7 November 2005	list
(813670) 2007 RY_{28}	3 December 2005	list
(816034) 2011 AJ_{43}	31 October 2005	list
(816178) 2011 CE_{76}	24 October 2005	list
(819528) 2014 JK_{90}	2 December 2005	list
(820166) 2014 QX_{274}	10 February 2005	list^{[M]}
(821022) 2015 BB_{406}	3 December 2005	list
(822803) 2015 VV_{104}	9 February 2005	list^{[M]}
(824612) 2017 CM_{13}	7 November 2005	list
(826543) 2021 CK_{14}	30 September 2005	list
(827253) 2001 FU_{198}	30 September 2005	list
(828674) 2005 CL_{39}	9 February 2005	list^{[M]}
(828675) 2005 CY_{40}	9 February 2005	list^{[M]}
(828908) 2005 TU_{203}	7 October 2005	list
(829088) 2005 XG_{107}	3 December 2005	list
(832699) 2010 EB_{143}	24 January 2003	list^{[O]}
(837862) 2013 UE_{48}	24 October 2005	list
(848855) 2005 DG	17 February 2005	list^{[M]}
(848856) 2005 DT_{4}	18 February 2005	list^{[M]}
(849222) 2005 TV_{224}	7 October 2005	list
(849380) 2005 VN_{153}	7 November 2005	list
(849447) 2005 XY_{106}	31 October 2005	list
(849689) 2006 DA_{212}	3 December 2005	list
(849990) 2006 SU_{140}	22 September 2006	list^{[P]}
(853090) 2008 XQ_{31}	2 December 2005	list
(861831) 2014 OO_{318}	30 September 2005	list
(868302) 2016 CK_{204}	18 February 2005	list^{[M]}
(868375) 2016 CC_{307}	3 December 2005	list
(870685) 2017 DR_{33}	30 September 2005	list
(871008) 2017 GW_{12}	31 October 2005	list
(871030) 2017 HJ_{10}	3 December 2005	list
(873713) 2019 TP_{44}	10 February 2005	list^{[M]}
(874579) 2021 FB_{11}	7 November 2005	list
(875589) 2005 EV_{134}	18 February 2005	list

== List of discovered comets ==
Andrea Boattini has also discovered or re-discovered 25 comets (see table).

List of comets discovered by Andrea Boattini
Designation	Discovery date	Source	Note
C/2007 W1 (Boattini)	20 November 2007	MPEC 2007-W63	
C/2008 J1 (Boattini)	2 May 2008	MPEC 2008-J17	
P/2008 O3 (Boattini)	29 July 2008	MPEC 2008-P05	Boattini 1
C/2008 S3 (Boattini)	29 September 2008	MPEC 2008-S96	
340P/Boattini	1 October 2008	MPEC 2008-T30	Boattini 2
206P/Barnard–Boattini	7 October 2008	MPEC 2008-T89	originally discovered by Edward Barnard in 1892
387P/Boattini	22 December 2008	MPEC 2008-Y53	Boattini 3
P/2009 B1 (Boattini)	21 January 2009	MPEC 2009-B46	Boattini 4
C/2009 P2 (Boattini)	15 August 2009	MPEC 2009-Q14	
398P/Boattini	26 August 2009	MPEC 2009-Q84	Boattini 5
C/2009 W2 (Boattini)	21 November 2009	MPEC 2009-W103	
C/2010 F1 (Boattini)	17 March 2010	MPEC 2010-F32	
C/2010 G1 (Boattini)	5 April 2010	MPEC 2010-G27	
C/2010 J1 (Boattini)	6 May 2010	MPEC 2010-J32	
510P/Boattini	17 October 2010	MPEC 2010-U18	Boattini 6
C/2010 U3 (Boattini)	31 October 2010	MPEC 2010-V55	
P/2011 JB_{15} (Spacewatch–Boattini)	28 May 2011	MPEC 2011-K56	
C/2011 L6 (Boattini)	28 May 2011	MPEC 2011-K56	
P/2011 V1 (Boattini)	22 October 2011	MPEC 2011-V13	Boattini 7
P/2011 Y2 (Boattini)	24 December 2011	MPEC 2011-Y49	Boattini 8
C/2011 Y3 (Boattini)	25 December 2011	MPEC 2011-Y50	Boattini 9
C/2013 F1 (Boattini)	23 March 2013	MPEC 2013-F46	
C/2013 H2 (Boattini)	22 April 2013	MPEC 2013-H45	
C/2013 J5 (Boattini)	13 May 2013	MPEC 2013-K25	
C/2013 V1 (Boattini)	4 November 2013	MPEC 2013-V32	

== See also ==
- List of minor planet discoverers § A. Boattini
