= 398P/Boattini =

Jupiter-family comet

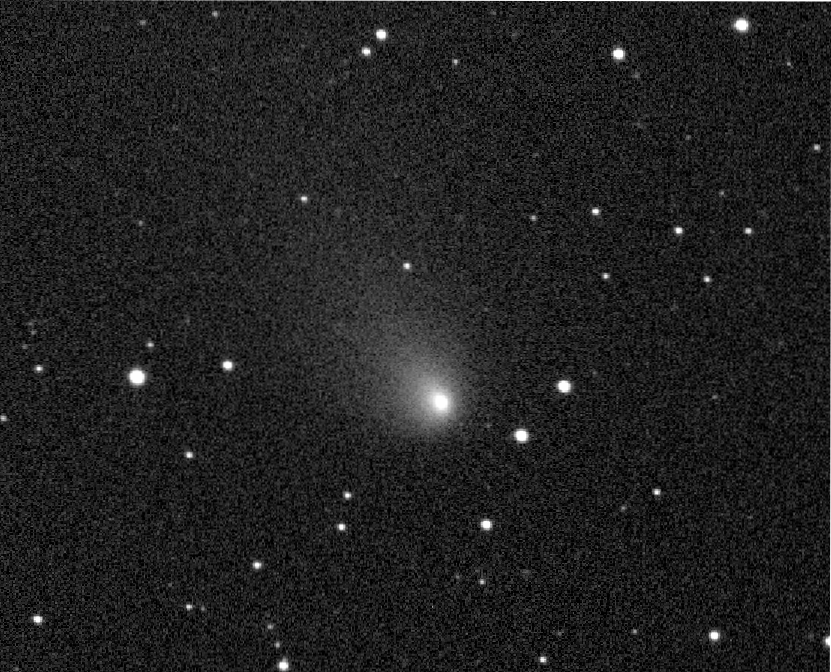
- Comet 398P/Boattini photographed from the Zwicky Transient Facility on 28 December 2020.

Discovery
- Discovered by: Andrea Boattini
- Discovery site: Catalina Sky Survey
- Discovery date: 26 August 2009

Designations
- MPC designation: P/2009 Q4, P/2020 P2
- Alternative designations: Boattini 5

Orbital characteristics
- Epoch: 9 June 2026 (JD 2461200.5)
- Observation arc: 21.54 years (Note: Observation arc from the Minor Planet Center database covering dates from 31 January 2004 until 17 August 2025.)
- Earliest precovery date: 31 January 2004
- Number of observations: 2,560
- Aphelion: 4.947 AU
- Perihelion: 1.300 AU
- Semi-major axis: 3.124 AU
- Eccentricity: 0.58376
- Orbital period: 5.52 years
- Inclination: 11.028°
- Longitude of ascending node: 127.41°
- Argument of periapsis: 320.31°
- Mean anomaly: 354.83°
- Last perihelion: 7 July 2026
- Next perihelion: 10 January 2032
- T_{Jupiter}: 2.901
- Earth MOID: 0.346 AU
- Jupiter MOID: 0.599 AU

Physical characteristics
- Mean radius: 0.6 km (0.37 mi)
- Comet total magnitude (M1): 15.2
- Comet nuclear magnitude (M2): 17.1

Comet Boattini 5, also known as 398P/Boattini, is a Jupiter-family comet with a 5.53-year orbit around the Sun. It is the 10th comet discovered by Italian astronomer, Andrea Boattini. (Note: This figure includes 206P/Barnard–Boattini, a comet originally discovered by Edward Emerson Barnard in 1892 and was previously lost for 116 years until Boattini spotted it in 2008.)

== Observational history ==
Boattini spotted this comet, initially designated as P/2009 Q4, as a 19th-magnitude object with a strongly condensed coma on the night of 26 August 2009. At the time, it was located in the constellation Taurus. (Note: Reported initial position upon discovery was: α = 4^{h} 27^{m} 20.05^{s}, δ = 8° 18′ 42.1″) Precovery images of the comet as early as January 2004 were also found. Additional astrometric measurements conducted in October 2009 had shown the comet as periodic, completing one revolution once every 5.5 years.

The comet was predicted to return in June 2015, but no observations were reported. However in August 2025, the COIAS project did found archival images of the comet's 2015 apparition, which was taken by the Subaru Telescope.

It was later recovered on its next apparition as P/2020 P2, on CCD images taken from the ATLAS facility of the Mauna Loa Observatory. It experienced an outburst on 28 September 2020 when it temporarily brightened by 1.4 magnitudes for four days. Observations from TESS noted that the comet exhibited a two-phase brightening on another outburst event in early 2021.

It was given a permanent numerical designation as 398P/Boattini in December 2020.

== Physical characteristics ==
Infrared observations conducted by the Wide-field Infrared Survey Explorer (WISE) in 2010 revealed that the nucleus of 398P/Boattini has an effective radius of around 0.6 km (0.37 mi).

Narrowband-filter observations at the TRAPPIST-North facility of the Oukaïmeden Observatory in November 2020 detected emissions of cyanogen (CN) compounds in its coma, however it was noticeably depleted in carbon compounds (C_{2} and C_{3}), one of a few such carbon-chain poor Jupiter-family comets ever known. (Note: The other known carbon-chain poor JFCs were 21P/Giacobini–Zinner and 260P/McNaught.)

== Notes ==
Numbered comets
Previous; 397P/Lemmon	398P/Boattini	Next; 399P/PanSTARRS
