= List of minor planets: 693001–694000 =

The following is a partial list of minor planets, running from minor-planet number 693001 through 694000, inclusive. The primary data for this and other partial lists is based on JPL's "Small-Body Orbital Elements" and data available from the Minor Planet Center. Critical list information is also provided by the MPC, unless otherwise specified from Lowell Observatory. A detailed description of the table's columns and additional sources are given on the main page including a complete list of every page in this series, and a statistical break-up on the dynamical classification of minor planets.

Also see the summary list of all named bodies in numerical and alphabetical order, and the corresponding naming citations for the number range of this particular list. New namings may only be added to this list after official publication, as the preannouncement of names is condemned by the Working Group for Small Bodies Nomenclature of the International Astronomical Union.

| Near-Earth obj. | MBA (inner) | MBA (outer) | Centaur |
| Mars-crosser | MBA (middle) | Jupiter trojan | Trans-Neptunian obj. |
| Unclassified |

== 693001–693100 ==
| Designation | | | Discovery | | | Properties | | Ref |
| Permanent | Provisional | Named after | Date | Site | Discoverer(s) | Category | Diam. | Ref |
|---|---|---|---|---|---|---|---|---|
| 693001 | 2015 DM_{26} | — | January 29, 2011 | Kitt Peak | Spacewatch | · | 950 m | MPC · JPL |
| 693002 | 2015 DX_{28} | — | February 16, 2015 | Haleakala | Pan-STARRS 1 | · | 1.0 km | MPC · JPL |
| 693003 | 2015 DM_{34} | — | February 16, 2015 | Haleakala | Pan-STARRS 1 | · | 1.2 km | MPC · JPL |
| 693004 | 2015 DH_{37} | — | September 19, 2012 | Mount Lemmon | Mount Lemmon Survey | · | 2.8 km | MPC · JPL |
| 693005 | 2015 DU_{37} | — | March 9, 2011 | Mount Lemmon | Mount Lemmon Survey | · | 1.3 km | MPC · JPL |
| 693006 | 2015 DU_{40} | — | January 27, 2015 | Haleakala | Pan-STARRS 1 | 3:2 | 4.0 km | MPC · JPL |
| 693007 | 2015 DF_{41} | — | January 27, 2015 | Haleakala | Pan-STARRS 1 | · | 1.2 km | MPC · JPL |
| 693008 | 2015 DC_{42} | — | October 27, 2005 | Catalina | CSS | · | 1.7 km | MPC · JPL |
| 693009 | 2015 DE_{44} | — | January 27, 2015 | Haleakala | Pan-STARRS 1 | · | 1.2 km | MPC · JPL |
| 693010 | 2015 DQ_{47} | — | February 16, 2015 | Haleakala | Pan-STARRS 1 | · | 1.3 km | MPC · JPL |
| 693011 | 2015 DS_{51} | — | February 16, 2015 | Haleakala | Pan-STARRS 1 | · | 1.1 km | MPC · JPL |
| 693012 | 2015 DB_{52} | — | March 27, 2011 | Mount Lemmon | Mount Lemmon Survey | (5) | 1.2 km | MPC · JPL |
| 693013 | 2015 DZ_{52} | — | January 21, 2015 | Haleakala | Pan-STARRS 1 | · | 1.2 km | MPC · JPL |
| 693014 | 2015 DU_{57} | — | August 25, 2001 | Palomar | NEAT | THB | 3.1 km | MPC · JPL |
| 693015 | 2015 DR_{58} | — | January 22, 2015 | Haleakala | Pan-STARRS 1 | · | 1.0 km | MPC · JPL |
| 693016 | 2015 DY_{58} | — | August 16, 2009 | Kitt Peak | Spacewatch | · | 840 m | MPC · JPL |
| 693017 | 2015 DM_{63} | — | September 14, 2013 | Haleakala | Pan-STARRS 1 | · | 1.0 km | MPC · JPL |
| 693018 | 2015 DN_{63} | — | January 20, 2015 | Haleakala | Pan-STARRS 1 | · | 850 m | MPC · JPL |
| 693019 | 2015 DX_{70} | — | February 25, 2011 | Mount Lemmon | Mount Lemmon Survey | · | 1.3 km | MPC · JPL |
| 693020 | 2015 DC_{72} | — | April 19, 2007 | Mount Lemmon | Mount Lemmon Survey | · | 950 m | MPC · JPL |
| 693021 | 2015 DY_{76} | — | March 29, 2008 | Kitt Peak | Spacewatch | · | 1.1 km | MPC · JPL |
| 693022 | 2015 DK_{79} | — | December 26, 2005 | Kitt Peak | Spacewatch | · | 1.0 km | MPC · JPL |
| 693023 | 2015 DQ_{79} | — | January 22, 2015 | Haleakala | Pan-STARRS 1 | · | 990 m | MPC · JPL |
| 693024 | 2015 DK_{80} | — | February 16, 2015 | Haleakala | Pan-STARRS 1 | · | 1.0 km | MPC · JPL |
| 693025 | 2015 DL_{82} | — | November 25, 2005 | Catalina | CSS | 3:2 · SHU | 4.5 km | MPC · JPL |
| 693026 | 2015 DT_{83} | — | January 21, 2015 | Haleakala | Pan-STARRS 1 | · | 1.2 km | MPC · JPL |
| 693027 | 2015 DA_{85} | — | September 1, 2013 | Haleakala | Pan-STARRS 1 | · | 550 m | MPC · JPL |
| 693028 | 2015 DG_{85} | — | March 1, 2011 | Mount Lemmon | Mount Lemmon Survey | · | 790 m | MPC · JPL |
| 693029 | 2015 DN_{88} | — | January 16, 2015 | Haleakala | Pan-STARRS 1 | · | 1.0 km | MPC · JPL |
| 693030 | 2015 DS_{88} | — | March 1, 2011 | Mount Lemmon | Mount Lemmon Survey | (5) | 920 m | MPC · JPL |
| 693031 | 2015 DA_{92} | — | November 28, 2013 | Haleakala | Pan-STARRS 1 | · | 1.0 km | MPC · JPL |
| 693032 | 2015 DD_{94} | — | September 7, 2004 | Socorro | LINEAR | · | 1.2 km | MPC · JPL |
| 693033 | 2015 DF_{98} | — | February 16, 2015 | Haleakala | Pan-STARRS 1 | GEF | 790 m | MPC · JPL |
| 693034 | 2015 DJ_{100} | — | April 30, 2011 | Kitt Peak | Spacewatch | EOS | 2.1 km | MPC · JPL |
| 693035 | 2015 DZ_{103} | — | February 17, 2015 | Haleakala | Pan-STARRS 1 | · | 2.9 km | MPC · JPL |
| 693036 | 2015 DZ_{106} | — | February 13, 2015 | Mount Lemmon | Mount Lemmon Survey | · | 1.2 km | MPC · JPL |
| 693037 | 2015 DX_{113} | — | August 14, 2012 | Siding Spring | SSS | · | 3.8 km | MPC · JPL |
| 693038 | 2015 DW_{114} | — | March 13, 2011 | Mount Lemmon | Mount Lemmon Survey | · | 1.1 km | MPC · JPL |
| 693039 | 2015 DJ_{120} | — | January 28, 2015 | Haleakala | Pan-STARRS 1 | · | 1.1 km | MPC · JPL |
| 693040 | 2015 DU_{124} | — | December 29, 2014 | Haleakala | Pan-STARRS 1 | · | 1.4 km | MPC · JPL |
| 693041 | 2015 DU_{126} | — | October 24, 2013 | Mount Lemmon | Mount Lemmon Survey | EUN | 820 m | MPC · JPL |
| 693042 | 2015 DL_{128} | — | January 14, 2011 | Kitt Peak | Spacewatch | · | 900 m | MPC · JPL |
| 693043 Suhay | 2015 DC_{129} | Suhay | September 8, 2013 | La Palma | EURONEAR | · | 1.4 km | MPC · JPL |
| 693044 | 2015 DW_{129} | — | January 5, 2006 | Mount Lemmon | Mount Lemmon Survey | HNS | 1.1 km | MPC · JPL |
| 693045 | 2015 DB_{130} | — | November 30, 2005 | Mount Lemmon | Mount Lemmon Survey | MAR | 1.0 km | MPC · JPL |
| 693046 | 2015 DK_{130} | — | April 12, 2011 | Mount Lemmon | Mount Lemmon Survey | · | 1.3 km | MPC · JPL |
| 693047 | 2015 DO_{130} | — | December 30, 2005 | Kitt Peak | Spacewatch | · | 1.2 km | MPC · JPL |
| 693048 | 2015 DF_{132} | — | October 5, 2013 | Kitt Peak | Spacewatch | · | 1.5 km | MPC · JPL |
| 693049 | 2015 DT_{132} | — | February 17, 2015 | Haleakala | Pan-STARRS 1 | MAR | 940 m | MPC · JPL |
| 693050 | 2015 DQ_{133} | — | February 17, 2015 | Haleakala | Pan-STARRS 1 | · | 1.5 km | MPC · JPL |
| 693051 | 2015 DX_{133} | — | February 17, 2015 | Haleakala | Pan-STARRS 1 | · | 1.3 km | MPC · JPL |
| 693052 | 2015 DF_{134} | — | February 17, 2015 | Haleakala | Pan-STARRS 1 | EUN | 940 m | MPC · JPL |
| 693053 | 2015 DT_{134} | — | February 17, 2015 | Haleakala | Pan-STARRS 1 | · | 1.4 km | MPC · JPL |
| 693054 | 2015 DG_{135} | — | February 17, 2015 | Haleakala | Pan-STARRS 1 | L4 | 8.3 km | MPC · JPL |
| 693055 | 2015 DR_{135} | — | February 17, 2015 | Haleakala | Pan-STARRS 1 | · | 1.6 km | MPC · JPL |
| 693056 | 2015 DT_{135} | — | February 17, 2015 | Haleakala | Pan-STARRS 1 | EUN | 950 m | MPC · JPL |
| 693057 | 2015 DM_{144} | — | February 25, 2011 | Kitt Peak | Spacewatch | · | 1.1 km | MPC · JPL |
| 693058 | 2015 DR_{145} | — | November 28, 2014 | Haleakala | Pan-STARRS 1 | · | 960 m | MPC · JPL |
| 693059 | 2015 DY_{145} | — | February 10, 2011 | Mount Lemmon | Mount Lemmon Survey | · | 970 m | MPC · JPL |
| 693060 | 2015 DC_{152} | — | December 10, 2009 | Mount Lemmon | Mount Lemmon Survey | · | 1.2 km | MPC · JPL |
| 693061 | 2015 DO_{159} | — | August 19, 2012 | Siding Spring | SSS | · | 1.3 km | MPC · JPL |
| 693062 | 2015 DW_{160} | — | November 27, 2013 | Haleakala | Pan-STARRS 1 | 3:2 | 4.6 km | MPC · JPL |
| 693063 | 2015 DE_{161} | — | January 15, 2015 | Haleakala | Pan-STARRS 1 | · | 1.1 km | MPC · JPL |
| 693064 | 2015 DU_{161} | — | March 27, 2011 | Mount Lemmon | Mount Lemmon Survey | · | 1.4 km | MPC · JPL |
| 693065 | 2015 DB_{164} | — | March 14, 2007 | Mount Lemmon | Mount Lemmon Survey | · | 930 m | MPC · JPL |
| 693066 | 2015 DW_{165} | — | January 23, 2006 | Kitt Peak | Spacewatch | · | 1.0 km | MPC · JPL |
| 693067 | 2015 DE_{167} | — | March 27, 2011 | Mount Lemmon | Mount Lemmon Survey | · | 1.1 km | MPC · JPL |
| 693068 | 2015 DQ_{170} | — | November 7, 2007 | Mount Lemmon | Mount Lemmon Survey | · | 2.8 km | MPC · JPL |
| 693069 | 2015 DJ_{174} | — | January 22, 2015 | Haleakala | Pan-STARRS 1 | · | 1.5 km | MPC · JPL |
| 693070 | 2015 DK_{178} | — | October 4, 2013 | Mount Lemmon | Mount Lemmon Survey | EUN | 990 m | MPC · JPL |
| 693071 | 2015 DY_{189} | — | January 27, 2015 | Haleakala | Pan-STARRS 1 | · | 1.3 km | MPC · JPL |
| 693072 | 2015 DO_{190} | — | November 9, 2013 | Haleakala | Pan-STARRS 1 | · | 1.2 km | MPC · JPL |
| 693073 | 2015 DB_{194} | — | October 16, 2009 | Mount Lemmon | Mount Lemmon Survey | MAR | 750 m | MPC · JPL |
| 693074 | 2015 DC_{202} | — | February 23, 2015 | Haleakala | Pan-STARRS 1 | · | 960 m | MPC · JPL |
| 693075 | 2015 DP_{206} | — | February 23, 2015 | Haleakala | Pan-STARRS 1 | · | 1.2 km | MPC · JPL |
| 693076 | 2015 DT_{207} | — | January 28, 2015 | Haleakala | Pan-STARRS 1 | T_{j} (2.96) · 3:2 | 5.3 km | MPC · JPL |
| 693077 | 2015 DW_{207} | — | August 22, 2012 | Haleakala | Pan-STARRS 1 | HNS | 890 m | MPC · JPL |
| 693078 | 2015 DW_{208} | — | October 22, 2003 | Apache Point | SDSS | · | 1.5 km | MPC · JPL |
| 693079 | 2015 DT_{209} | — | February 23, 2015 | Haleakala | Pan-STARRS 1 | · | 1.5 km | MPC · JPL |
| 693080 | 2015 DV_{209} | — | May 21, 2011 | Mount Lemmon | Mount Lemmon Survey | · | 1.6 km | MPC · JPL |
| 693081 | 2015 DB_{219} | — | May 22, 2006 | Mount Lemmon | Mount Lemmon Survey | · | 1.3 km | MPC · JPL |
| 693082 | 2015 DQ_{220} | — | August 17, 2012 | Črni Vrh | Mikuž, H. | · | 1.4 km | MPC · JPL |
| 693083 | 2015 DD_{221} | — | April 22, 2011 | Kitt Peak | Spacewatch | · | 1 km | MPC · JPL |
| 693084 | 2015 DN_{221} | — | August 12, 2004 | Cerro Tololo | Deep Ecliptic Survey | · | 1.2 km | MPC · JPL |
| 693085 | 2015 DG_{223} | — | March 14, 2007 | Mount Lemmon | Mount Lemmon Survey | · | 1 km | MPC · JPL |
| 693086 | 2015 DQ_{229} | — | February 16, 2015 | Haleakala | Pan-STARRS 1 | · | 1.2 km | MPC · JPL |
| 693087 | 2015 DA_{230} | — | January 26, 2015 | Haleakala | Pan-STARRS 1 | · | 1.9 km | MPC · JPL |
| 693088 | 2015 DG_{232} | — | October 8, 2008 | Mount Lemmon | Mount Lemmon Survey | · | 1.2 km | MPC · JPL |
| 693089 | 2015 DL_{235} | — | March 2, 2011 | Kitt Peak | Spacewatch | · | 1.2 km | MPC · JPL |
| 693090 | 2015 DN_{241} | — | January 21, 2015 | Haleakala | Pan-STARRS 1 | · | 1.4 km | MPC · JPL |
| 693091 | 2015 DT_{241} | — | February 18, 2015 | Haleakala | Pan-STARRS 1 | · | 1.5 km | MPC · JPL |
| 693092 | 2015 DG_{242} | — | January 21, 2015 | Haleakala | Pan-STARRS 1 | · | 1.2 km | MPC · JPL |
| 693093 | 2015 DE_{243} | — | January 23, 2015 | Haleakala | Pan-STARRS 1 | 526 | 2.2 km | MPC · JPL |
| 693094 | 2015 DG_{244} | — | January 16, 2015 | Haleakala | Pan-STARRS 1 | · | 1.6 km | MPC · JPL |
| 693095 | 2015 DU_{245} | — | September 29, 2008 | Kitt Peak | Spacewatch | · | 1.3 km | MPC · JPL |
| 693096 | 2015 DW_{248} | — | February 17, 2015 | Cerro Tololo | DECam | SDO | 210 km | MPC · JPL |
| 693097 | 2015 DU_{250} | — | February 19, 2015 | Haleakala | Pan-STARRS 1 | DOR | 1.6 km | MPC · JPL |
| 693098 | 2015 DD_{251} | — | February 19, 2015 | Haleakala | Pan-STARRS 1 | · | 1.5 km | MPC · JPL |
| 693099 | 2015 DK_{252} | — | April 11, 2016 | Haleakala | Pan-STARRS 1 | MAR | 760 m | MPC · JPL |
| 693100 | 2015 DY_{256} | — | February 18, 2015 | Haleakala | Pan-STARRS 1 | · | 1.2 km | MPC · JPL |

== 693101–693200 ==
back to top

| Designation | | | Discovery | | | Properties | | Ref |
| Permanent | Provisional | Named after | Date | Site | Discoverer(s) | Category | Diam. | Ref |
|---|---|---|---|---|---|---|---|---|
| 693101 | 2015 DJ_{258} | — | February 16, 2015 | Haleakala | Pan-STARRS 1 | · | 1.7 km | MPC · JPL |
| 693102 | 2015 DX_{258} | — | February 25, 2015 | Kitt Peak | Spacewatch | · | 1.4 km | MPC · JPL |
| 693103 | 2015 DW_{263} | — | February 18, 2015 | Haleakala | Pan-STARRS 1 | · | 1.3 km | MPC · JPL |
| 693104 | 2015 DD_{264} | — | February 27, 2015 | Haleakala | Pan-STARRS 1 | · | 1.2 km | MPC · JPL |
| 693105 | 2015 DP_{264} | — | February 26, 2015 | Mount Lemmon | Mount Lemmon Survey | NYS | 1.1 km | MPC · JPL |
| 693106 | 2015 DA_{267} | — | February 16, 2015 | Haleakala | Pan-STARRS 1 | · | 1.1 km | MPC · JPL |
| 693107 | 2015 DL_{268} | — | February 16, 2015 | Haleakala | Pan-STARRS 1 | · | 1.3 km | MPC · JPL |
| 693108 | 2015 DQ_{268} | — | February 16, 2015 | Haleakala | Pan-STARRS 1 | · | 1.3 km | MPC · JPL |
| 693109 | 2015 DY_{269} | — | February 23, 2015 | Haleakala | Pan-STARRS 1 | · | 1.4 km | MPC · JPL |
| 693110 | 2015 DZ_{269} | — | February 17, 2015 | Haleakala | Pan-STARRS 1 | · | 1.2 km | MPC · JPL |
| 693111 | 2015 DH_{270} | — | February 16, 2015 | Haleakala | Pan-STARRS 1 | · | 1.0 km | MPC · JPL |
| 693112 | 2015 DV_{270} | — | February 16, 2015 | Haleakala | Pan-STARRS 1 | · | 1.4 km | MPC · JPL |
| 693113 | 2015 DT_{272} | — | February 16, 2015 | Haleakala | Pan-STARRS 1 | · | 970 m | MPC · JPL |
| 693114 | 2015 DV_{272} | — | February 27, 2015 | Haleakala | Pan-STARRS 1 | · | 1.3 km | MPC · JPL |
| 693115 | 2015 DY_{272} | — | February 16, 2015 | Haleakala | Pan-STARRS 1 | · | 1.3 km | MPC · JPL |
| 693116 | 2015 DM_{273} | — | February 20, 2015 | Haleakala | Pan-STARRS 1 | HNS | 810 m | MPC · JPL |
| 693117 | 2015 DT_{273} | — | February 16, 2015 | Haleakala | Pan-STARRS 1 | · | 760 m | MPC · JPL |
| 693118 | 2015 DB_{274} | — | February 18, 2015 | Mount Lemmon | Mount Lemmon Survey | · | 1.1 km | MPC · JPL |
| 693119 | 2015 DF_{277} | — | February 27, 2015 | Mount Lemmon | Mount Lemmon Survey | · | 1 km | MPC · JPL |
| 693120 | 2015 DH_{277} | — | February 16, 2015 | Haleakala | Pan-STARRS 1 | · | 1.6 km | MPC · JPL |
| 693121 | 2015 DO_{277} | — | February 27, 2015 | Haleakala | Pan-STARRS 1 | HOF | 1.8 km | MPC · JPL |
| 693122 | 2015 DK_{278} | — | February 27, 2015 | Haleakala | Pan-STARRS 1 | · | 1.1 km | MPC · JPL |
| 693123 | 2015 DP_{279} | — | February 18, 2015 | Haleakala | Pan-STARRS 1 | AGN | 810 m | MPC · JPL |
| 693124 | 2015 DL_{290} | — | December 17, 2009 | Kitt Peak | Spacewatch | EUN | 1.1 km | MPC · JPL |
| 693125 | 2015 DW_{291} | — | January 20, 2015 | Haleakala | Pan-STARRS 1 | · | 1.1 km | MPC · JPL |
| 693126 | 2015 DY_{294} | — | February 23, 2015 | Haleakala | Pan-STARRS 1 | · | 1.3 km | MPC · JPL |
| 693127 | 2015 DV_{295} | — | February 16, 2015 | Haleakala | Pan-STARRS 1 | NEM | 1.6 km | MPC · JPL |
| 693128 | 2015 DK_{296} | — | February 17, 2015 | Haleakala | Pan-STARRS 1 | · | 1.3 km | MPC · JPL |
| 693129 | 2015 DG_{297} | — | February 24, 2015 | Haleakala | Pan-STARRS 1 | · | 1.3 km | MPC · JPL |
| 693130 | 2015 DR_{298} | — | February 27, 2015 | Haleakala | Pan-STARRS 1 | · | 1.2 km | MPC · JPL |
| 693131 | 2015 DV_{298} | — | February 16, 2015 | Haleakala | Pan-STARRS 1 | · | 1.2 km | MPC · JPL |
| 693132 | 2015 DY_{298} | — | February 27, 2015 | Haleakala | Pan-STARRS 1 | · | 970 m | MPC · JPL |
| 693133 | 2015 DS_{299} | — | February 17, 2015 | Haleakala | Pan-STARRS 1 | EUN | 890 m | MPC · JPL |
| 693134 | 2015 DT_{299} | — | February 17, 2015 | Haleakala | Pan-STARRS 1 | · | 1 km | MPC · JPL |
| 693135 | 2015 DX_{299} | — | February 20, 2015 | Haleakala | Pan-STARRS 1 | · | 900 m | MPC · JPL |
| 693136 | 2015 DT_{300} | — | February 18, 2015 | Haleakala | Pan-STARRS 1 | · | 1.4 km | MPC · JPL |
| 693137 | 2015 DN_{303} | — | January 21, 2015 | Haleakala | Pan-STARRS 1 | · | 1.4 km | MPC · JPL |
| 693138 | 2015 DN_{305} | — | February 23, 2015 | Haleakala | Pan-STARRS 1 | · | 1.4 km | MPC · JPL |
| 693139 | 2015 DY_{305} | — | February 20, 2015 | Haleakala | Pan-STARRS 1 | EUN | 850 m | MPC · JPL |
| 693140 | 2015 DE_{307} | — | February 27, 2015 | Haleakala | Pan-STARRS 1 | · | 1.3 km | MPC · JPL |
| 693141 | 2015 DL_{311} | — | February 27, 2015 | Haleakala | Pan-STARRS 1 | · | 1.5 km | MPC · JPL |
| 693142 | 2015 EQ_{1} | — | April 13, 2011 | Kitt Peak | Spacewatch | · | 1.1 km | MPC · JPL |
| 693143 | 2015 EC_{11} | — | September 15, 2013 | Haleakala | Pan-STARRS 1 | · | 770 m | MPC · JPL |
| 693144 | 2015 EP_{12} | — | September 30, 2003 | Kitt Peak | Spacewatch | · | 630 m | MPC · JPL |
| 693145 | 2015 ET_{12} | — | January 23, 2015 | Haleakala | Pan-STARRS 1 | · | 880 m | MPC · JPL |
| 693146 | 2015 EL_{18} | — | January 17, 2015 | Haleakala | Pan-STARRS 1 | (5) | 1.3 km | MPC · JPL |
| 693147 | 2015 EF_{21} | — | October 1, 2005 | Mount Lemmon | Mount Lemmon Survey | (5) | 810 m | MPC · JPL |
| 693148 | 2015 ET_{21} | — | November 7, 2013 | Kitt Peak | Spacewatch | · | 1 km | MPC · JPL |
| 693149 | 2015 EN_{23} | — | April 24, 2007 | Mount Lemmon | Mount Lemmon Survey | · | 1.2 km | MPC · JPL |
| 693150 | 2015 EN_{25} | — | January 24, 2015 | Mount Lemmon | Mount Lemmon Survey | · | 1.3 km | MPC · JPL |
| 693151 | 2015 ES_{30} | — | January 27, 2015 | Haleakala | Pan-STARRS 1 | · | 1.2 km | MPC · JPL |
| 693152 | 2015 EB_{31} | — | January 6, 2006 | Kitt Peak | Spacewatch | · | 1.3 km | MPC · JPL |
| 693153 | 2015 EN_{32} | — | December 25, 2005 | Kitt Peak | Spacewatch | · | 1.1 km | MPC · JPL |
| 693154 | 2015 EY_{32} | — | March 10, 2011 | Kitt Peak | Spacewatch | · | 900 m | MPC · JPL |
| 693155 | 2015 EF_{33} | — | March 9, 2011 | Mount Lemmon | Mount Lemmon Survey | · | 1.0 km | MPC · JPL |
| 693156 | 2015 EW_{34} | — | February 26, 2015 | Mount Lemmon | Mount Lemmon Survey | · | 1.1 km | MPC · JPL |
| 693157 | 2015 EV_{35} | — | July 17, 2004 | Cerro Tololo | Deep Ecliptic Survey | · | 880 m | MPC · JPL |
| 693158 | 2015 EV_{38} | — | October 26, 2008 | Mount Lemmon | Mount Lemmon Survey | · | 1.5 km | MPC · JPL |
| 693159 | 2015 EG_{40} | — | February 16, 2015 | Haleakala | Pan-STARRS 1 | WIT | 680 m | MPC · JPL |
| 693160 | 2015 EV_{47} | — | March 14, 2015 | Haleakala | Pan-STARRS 1 | · | 1.2 km | MPC · JPL |
| 693161 | 2015 EC_{52} | — | March 14, 2015 | Haleakala | Pan-STARRS 1 | · | 1.3 km | MPC · JPL |
| 693162 | 2015 ES_{52} | — | February 20, 2015 | Haleakala | Pan-STARRS 1 | · | 1.2 km | MPC · JPL |
| 693163 | 2015 EO_{57} | — | March 14, 2015 | Haleakala | Pan-STARRS 1 | · | 1.4 km | MPC · JPL |
| 693164 | 2015 EQ_{58} | — | May 12, 2011 | Mount Lemmon | Mount Lemmon Survey | · | 1.5 km | MPC · JPL |
| 693165 | 2015 EH_{60} | — | February 24, 2015 | Haleakala | Pan-STARRS 1 | · | 1.2 km | MPC · JPL |
| 693166 | 2015 EH_{62} | — | January 18, 2015 | Haleakala | Pan-STARRS 1 | · | 1.0 km | MPC · JPL |
| 693167 | 2015 ES_{66} | — | October 26, 2005 | Kitt Peak | Spacewatch | · | 900 m | MPC · JPL |
| 693168 | 2015 EC_{71} | — | October 24, 2013 | Kitt Peak | Spacewatch | · | 1.1 km | MPC · JPL |
| 693169 | 2015 EZ_{71} | — | February 24, 2015 | Haleakala | Pan-STARRS 1 | · | 1.2 km | MPC · JPL |
| 693170 | 2015 EY_{72} | — | July 9, 2005 | Kitt Peak | Spacewatch | · | 830 m | MPC · JPL |
| 693171 | 2015 EX_{75} | — | June 19, 2007 | Kitt Peak | Spacewatch | JUN | 840 m | MPC · JPL |
| 693172 | 2015 FD_{3} | — | March 23, 2003 | Apache Point | SDSS Collaboration | · | 1.3 km | MPC · JPL |
| 693173 | 2015 FE_{5} | — | December 26, 2014 | Haleakala | Pan-STARRS 1 | EUN | 970 m | MPC · JPL |
| 693174 | 2015 FX_{7} | — | March 5, 2011 | Mount Lemmon | Mount Lemmon Survey | · | 1.1 km | MPC · JPL |
| 693175 | 2015 FN_{10} | — | March 16, 2015 | Haleakala | Pan-STARRS 1 | · | 1.7 km | MPC · JPL |
| 693176 | 2015 FG_{12} | — | March 17, 2015 | Haleakala | Pan-STARRS 1 | · | 1.3 km | MPC · JPL |
| 693177 | 2015 FC_{13} | — | July 28, 2011 | Haleakala | Pan-STARRS 1 | · | 1.6 km | MPC · JPL |
| 693178 | 2015 FF_{14} | — | May 13, 2011 | Mount Lemmon | Mount Lemmon Survey | EUN | 920 m | MPC · JPL |
| 693179 | 2015 FE_{15} | — | December 19, 2009 | Mount Lemmon | Mount Lemmon Survey | EUN | 1.0 km | MPC · JPL |
| 693180 | 2015 FK_{16} | — | November 2, 2013 | Kitt Peak | Spacewatch | · | 1.1 km | MPC · JPL |
| 693181 | 2015 FC_{17} | — | February 17, 2015 | Haleakala | Pan-STARRS 1 | · | 1.6 km | MPC · JPL |
| 693182 | 2015 FO_{17} | — | January 23, 2006 | Kitt Peak | Spacewatch | JUN | 920 m | MPC · JPL |
| 693183 | 2015 FG_{20} | — | February 17, 2015 | Haleakala | Pan-STARRS 1 | · | 1.7 km | MPC · JPL |
| 693184 | 2015 FM_{20} | — | June 4, 2011 | Mount Lemmon | Mount Lemmon Survey | · | 1.4 km | MPC · JPL |
| 693185 | 2015 FG_{21} | — | February 16, 2015 | Haleakala | Pan-STARRS 1 | EUN | 970 m | MPC · JPL |
| 693186 | 2015 FJ_{25} | — | November 10, 2005 | Mount Lemmon | Mount Lemmon Survey | MAR | 950 m | MPC · JPL |
| 693187 | 2015 FT_{25} | — | January 15, 2015 | Haleakala | Pan-STARRS 1 | ADE | 1.4 km | MPC · JPL |
| 693188 | 2015 FH_{27} | — | October 5, 2013 | Kitt Peak | Spacewatch | · | 1.5 km | MPC · JPL |
| 693189 | 2015 FP_{31} | — | November 30, 2005 | Kitt Peak | Spacewatch | EUN | 890 m | MPC · JPL |
| 693190 | 2015 FJ_{38} | — | January 23, 2015 | Haleakala | Pan-STARRS 1 | · | 2.0 km | MPC · JPL |
| 693191 | 2015 FO_{40} | — | March 17, 2015 | Haleakala | Pan-STARRS 1 | · | 1.6 km | MPC · JPL |
| 693192 | 2015 FA_{41} | — | October 8, 2007 | Mount Lemmon | Mount Lemmon Survey | · | 1.5 km | MPC · JPL |
| 693193 | 2015 FB_{42} | — | March 17, 2015 | Haleakala | Pan-STARRS 1 | · | 1.4 km | MPC · JPL |
| 693194 | 2015 FY_{43} | — | October 18, 2012 | Haleakala | Pan-STARRS 1 | · | 1.8 km | MPC · JPL |
| 693195 | 2015 FX_{47} | — | August 22, 2001 | Kitt Peak | Spacewatch | V | 630 m | MPC · JPL |
| 693196 | 2015 FG_{52} | — | December 19, 2014 | Haleakala | Pan-STARRS 1 | H | 520 m | MPC · JPL |
| 693197 | 2015 FF_{53} | — | January 8, 2011 | Mount Lemmon | Mount Lemmon Survey | (5) | 890 m | MPC · JPL |
| 693198 | 2015 FA_{58} | — | November 26, 2013 | Mount Lemmon | Mount Lemmon Survey | · | 1.5 km | MPC · JPL |
| 693199 | 2015 FU_{59} | — | September 16, 2009 | Kitt Peak | Spacewatch | EUN | 880 m | MPC · JPL |
| 693200 | 2015 FN_{61} | — | September 15, 2013 | Haleakala | Pan-STARRS 1 | · | 1.8 km | MPC · JPL |

== 693201–693300 ==
back to top

| Designation | | | Discovery | | | Properties | | Ref |
| Permanent | Provisional | Named after | Date | Site | Discoverer(s) | Category | Diam. | Ref |
|---|---|---|---|---|---|---|---|---|
| 693201 | 2015 FX_{73} | — | November 27, 2013 | Haleakala | Pan-STARRS 1 | · | 1.2 km | MPC · JPL |
| 693202 | 2015 FM_{77} | — | March 18, 2015 | Haleakala | Pan-STARRS 1 | · | 1.6 km | MPC · JPL |
| 693203 | 2015 FJ_{80} | — | February 20, 2015 | Haleakala | Pan-STARRS 1 | · | 1.0 km | MPC · JPL |
| 693204 | 2015 FO_{83} | — | January 18, 2015 | Haleakala | Pan-STARRS 1 | · | 1.5 km | MPC · JPL |
| 693205 | 2015 FV_{83} | — | December 1, 2014 | Haleakala | Pan-STARRS 1 | (1547) | 1.3 km | MPC · JPL |
| 693206 | 2015 FH_{84} | — | January 16, 2015 | Haleakala | Pan-STARRS 1 | · | 1.4 km | MPC · JPL |
| 693207 | 2015 FZ_{87} | — | March 20, 2015 | Haleakala | Pan-STARRS 1 | · | 1.3 km | MPC · JPL |
| 693208 | 2015 FB_{90} | — | August 6, 2005 | Palomar | NEAT | V | 640 m | MPC · JPL |
| 693209 | 2015 FV_{95} | — | January 23, 2014 | Mount Lemmon | Mount Lemmon Survey | · | 1.6 km | MPC · JPL |
| 693210 | 2015 FN_{99} | — | September 23, 2008 | Kitt Peak | Spacewatch | · | 1.2 km | MPC · JPL |
| 693211 | 2015 FU_{100} | — | March 21, 2015 | Haleakala | Pan-STARRS 1 | · | 1.3 km | MPC · JPL |
| 693212 | 2015 FG_{105} | — | January 20, 2015 | Haleakala | Pan-STARRS 1 | · | 560 m | MPC · JPL |
| 693213 | 2015 FR_{105} | — | October 23, 2013 | Mount Lemmon | Mount Lemmon Survey | ADE | 1.3 km | MPC · JPL |
| 693214 | 2015 FP_{106} | — | April 5, 2011 | Mount Lemmon | Mount Lemmon Survey | · | 1.1 km | MPC · JPL |
| 693215 | 2015 FJ_{107} | — | August 24, 2008 | Kitt Peak | Spacewatch | · | 1.5 km | MPC · JPL |
| 693216 | 2015 FU_{108} | — | October 22, 2012 | Mount Lemmon | Mount Lemmon Survey | · | 1.5 km | MPC · JPL |
| 693217 | 2015 FE_{110} | — | March 20, 2015 | Haleakala | Pan-STARRS 1 | · | 1.3 km | MPC · JPL |
| 693218 | 2015 FT_{110} | — | May 27, 2011 | Kitt Peak | Spacewatch | EUN | 760 m | MPC · JPL |
| 693219 | 2015 FX_{111} | — | September 17, 2012 | Mount Lemmon | Mount Lemmon Survey | · | 1.5 km | MPC · JPL |
| 693220 | 2015 FK_{112} | — | October 29, 2008 | Kitt Peak | Spacewatch | HOF | 1.9 km | MPC · JPL |
| 693221 | 2015 FG_{113} | — | January 20, 2015 | Haleakala | Pan-STARRS 1 | · | 1.4 km | MPC · JPL |
| 693222 | 2015 FB_{114} | — | October 19, 2008 | Kitt Peak | Spacewatch | · | 1.4 km | MPC · JPL |
| 693223 | 2015 FP_{114} | — | March 20, 2015 | Haleakala | Pan-STARRS 1 | · | 1.4 km | MPC · JPL |
| 693224 | 2015 FX_{114} | — | March 20, 2015 | Haleakala | Pan-STARRS 1 | · | 1 km | MPC · JPL |
| 693225 | 2015 FN_{115} | — | March 2, 2006 | Kitt Peak | Spacewatch | · | 1.3 km | MPC · JPL |
| 693226 | 2015 FW_{115} | — | September 1, 2013 | Mount Lemmon | Mount Lemmon Survey | · | 1.6 km | MPC · JPL |
| 693227 | 2015 FM_{116} | — | November 28, 2013 | Mount Lemmon | Mount Lemmon Survey | · | 1.0 km | MPC · JPL |
| 693228 | 2015 FQ_{125} | — | September 2, 2013 | Mount Lemmon | Mount Lemmon Survey | · | 880 m | MPC · JPL |
| 693229 | 2015 FT_{128} | — | January 19, 2015 | Haleakala | Pan-STARRS 1 | T_{j} (2.99) · 3:2 | 4.1 km | MPC · JPL |
| 693230 | 2015 FV_{130} | — | October 27, 2009 | Mount Lemmon | Mount Lemmon Survey | MAR | 860 m | MPC · JPL |
| 693231 | 2015 FZ_{130} | — | January 16, 2011 | Mount Lemmon | Mount Lemmon Survey | (1547) | 1.5 km | MPC · JPL |
| 693232 | 2015 FD_{131} | — | March 14, 2015 | Mount Lemmon | Mount Lemmon Survey | · | 1.3 km | MPC · JPL |
| 693233 | 2015 FU_{131} | — | January 15, 2015 | Haleakala | Pan-STARRS 1 | · | 1.6 km | MPC · JPL |
| 693234 | 2015 FD_{132} | — | January 27, 2015 | Haleakala | Pan-STARRS 1 | · | 1.1 km | MPC · JPL |
| 693235 | 2015 FG_{133} | — | October 25, 2005 | Mount Lemmon | Mount Lemmon Survey | · | 1.0 km | MPC · JPL |
| 693236 | 2015 FB_{134} | — | March 26, 2011 | Kitt Peak | Spacewatch | · | 1.3 km | MPC · JPL |
| 693237 | 2015 FR_{137} | — | February 2, 2006 | Kitt Peak | Spacewatch | · | 1.3 km | MPC · JPL |
| 693238 | 2015 FS_{138} | — | March 25, 2011 | Kitt Peak | Spacewatch | · | 880 m | MPC · JPL |
| 693239 | 2015 FX_{139} | — | November 7, 2005 | Mauna Kea | A. Boattini | · | 1.4 km | MPC · JPL |
| 693240 | 2015 FU_{144} | — | January 23, 2015 | Haleakala | Pan-STARRS 1 | · | 1.4 km | MPC · JPL |
| 693241 | 2015 FG_{148} | — | May 12, 2011 | Mount Lemmon | Mount Lemmon Survey | · | 1.2 km | MPC · JPL |
| 693242 | 2015 FJ_{148} | — | April 2, 2006 | Kitt Peak | Spacewatch | AEO | 820 m | MPC · JPL |
| 693243 | 2015 FZ_{149} | — | December 11, 2013 | Haleakala | Pan-STARRS 1 | · | 1.8 km | MPC · JPL |
| 693244 | 2015 FQ_{151} | — | January 23, 2015 | Haleakala | Pan-STARRS 1 | JUN | 970 m | MPC · JPL |
| 693245 | 2015 FZ_{151} | — | September 23, 2008 | Mount Lemmon | Mount Lemmon Survey | HNS | 930 m | MPC · JPL |
| 693246 | 2015 FC_{153} | — | November 2, 2008 | Mount Lemmon | Mount Lemmon Survey | · | 1.4 km | MPC · JPL |
| 693247 | 2015 FU_{153} | — | June 6, 2011 | Mount Lemmon | Mount Lemmon Survey | · | 1.4 km | MPC · JPL |
| 693248 | 2015 FE_{155} | — | March 21, 2015 | Haleakala | Pan-STARRS 1 | · | 1.5 km | MPC · JPL |
| 693249 | 2015 FK_{155} | — | November 8, 2013 | Mount Lemmon | Mount Lemmon Survey | · | 1.3 km | MPC · JPL |
| 693250 | 2015 FF_{156} | — | March 21, 2015 | Haleakala | Pan-STARRS 1 | HNS | 730 m | MPC · JPL |
| 693251 | 2015 FD_{164} | — | January 14, 2011 | Mount Lemmon | Mount Lemmon Survey | · | 540 m | MPC · JPL |
| 693252 | 2015 FU_{166} | — | March 21, 2015 | Haleakala | Pan-STARRS 1 | · | 1.0 km | MPC · JPL |
| 693253 | 2015 FU_{169} | — | March 21, 2015 | Haleakala | Pan-STARRS 1 | · | 1.3 km | MPC · JPL |
| 693254 | 2015 FP_{170} | — | March 21, 2015 | Haleakala | Pan-STARRS 1 | AGN | 920 m | MPC · JPL |
| 693255 | 2015 FF_{174} | — | June 26, 2011 | Mount Lemmon | Mount Lemmon Survey | · | 1.6 km | MPC · JPL |
| 693256 | 2015 FA_{181} | — | August 13, 2012 | Haleakala | Pan-STARRS 1 | · | 1.5 km | MPC · JPL |
| 693257 | 2015 FV_{181} | — | November 28, 2013 | Mount Lemmon | Mount Lemmon Survey | · | 1.2 km | MPC · JPL |
| 693258 | 2015 FM_{182} | — | April 14, 2010 | Mount Lemmon | Mount Lemmon Survey | EOS | 1.4 km | MPC · JPL |
| 693259 | 2015 FS_{183} | — | September 14, 2012 | Catalina | CSS | · | 1.4 km | MPC · JPL |
| 693260 | 2015 FJ_{184} | — | September 26, 2008 | Kitt Peak | Spacewatch | · | 1.3 km | MPC · JPL |
| 693261 | 2015 FP_{185} | — | March 22, 2015 | Mount Lemmon | Mount Lemmon Survey | · | 1.4 km | MPC · JPL |
| 693262 | 2015 FO_{186} | — | April 11, 2007 | Kitt Peak | Spacewatch | (194) | 1.3 km | MPC · JPL |
| 693263 | 2015 FE_{187} | — | March 22, 2015 | Haleakala | Pan-STARRS 1 | MAR | 1.0 km | MPC · JPL |
| 693264 | 2015 FH_{189} | — | February 20, 2015 | Haleakala | Pan-STARRS 1 | · | 1.0 km | MPC · JPL |
| 693265 | 2015 FN_{189} | — | March 22, 2015 | Haleakala | Pan-STARRS 1 | · | 1.2 km | MPC · JPL |
| 693266 | 2015 FX_{189} | — | February 20, 2015 | Haleakala | Pan-STARRS 1 | · | 1.5 km | MPC · JPL |
| 693267 | 2015 FV_{190} | — | January 23, 2015 | Haleakala | Pan-STARRS 1 | (1547) | 1.2 km | MPC · JPL |
| 693268 | 2015 FX_{190} | — | November 9, 2013 | Mount Lemmon | Mount Lemmon Survey | · | 1.2 km | MPC · JPL |
| 693269 | 2015 FE_{191} | — | February 23, 2015 | Haleakala | Pan-STARRS 1 | EUN | 840 m | MPC · JPL |
| 693270 | 2015 FJ_{192} | — | September 13, 2013 | Catalina | CSS | · | 1.4 km | MPC · JPL |
| 693271 | 2015 FO_{192} | — | January 16, 2015 | Haleakala | Pan-STARRS 1 | EUN | 1.0 km | MPC · JPL |
| 693272 | 2015 FC_{193} | — | October 27, 2009 | Mount Lemmon | Mount Lemmon Survey | EUN | 900 m | MPC · JPL |
| 693273 | 2015 FU_{193} | — | March 22, 2015 | Mount Lemmon | Mount Lemmon Survey | AGN | 820 m | MPC · JPL |
| 693274 | 2015 FN_{194} | — | January 5, 2006 | Kitt Peak | Spacewatch | · | 1.2 km | MPC · JPL |
| 693275 | 2015 FX_{196} | — | November 22, 2005 | Kitt Peak | Spacewatch | · | 1 km | MPC · JPL |
| 693276 | 2015 FC_{197} | — | January 23, 2015 | Haleakala | Pan-STARRS 1 | · | 1.2 km | MPC · JPL |
| 693277 | 2015 FF_{200} | — | April 13, 2011 | Kitt Peak | Spacewatch | · | 1.2 km | MPC · JPL |
| 693278 | 2015 FL_{200} | — | January 23, 2015 | Haleakala | Pan-STARRS 1 | · | 1.4 km | MPC · JPL |
| 693279 | 2015 FW_{202} | — | September 19, 2003 | Kitt Peak | Spacewatch | · | 1.6 km | MPC · JPL |
| 693280 | 2015 FP_{204} | — | September 24, 2012 | Mount Lemmon | Mount Lemmon Survey | · | 1.7 km | MPC · JPL |
| 693281 | 2015 FK_{206} | — | January 22, 2015 | Haleakala | Pan-STARRS 1 | MAR | 730 m | MPC · JPL |
| 693282 | 2015 FD_{208} | — | February 25, 2007 | Mount Lemmon | Mount Lemmon Survey | 3:2 · SHU | 4.1 km | MPC · JPL |
| 693283 | 2015 FR_{209} | — | October 1, 2013 | Kitt Peak | Spacewatch | · | 820 m | MPC · JPL |
| 693284 | 2015 FL_{210} | — | February 16, 2015 | Haleakala | Pan-STARRS 1 | · | 1.2 km | MPC · JPL |
| 693285 | 2015 FO_{217} | — | February 27, 2015 | Haleakala | Pan-STARRS 1 | · | 1.3 km | MPC · JPL |
| 693286 | 2015 FC_{219} | — | March 23, 2015 | Haleakala | Pan-STARRS 1 | · | 1.2 km | MPC · JPL |
| 693287 | 2015 FX_{219} | — | October 13, 2013 | Nogales | M. Schwartz, P. R. Holvorcem | · | 1.5 km | MPC · JPL |
| 693288 | 2015 FU_{221} | — | September 4, 2008 | Kitt Peak | Spacewatch | · | 1.2 km | MPC · JPL |
| 693289 | 2015 FV_{221} | — | March 16, 2015 | Mount Lemmon | Mount Lemmon Survey | · | 1.4 km | MPC · JPL |
| 693290 | 2015 FC_{222} | — | October 9, 2012 | Mount Lemmon | Mount Lemmon Survey | · | 1.2 km | MPC · JPL |
| 693291 | 2015 FF_{225} | — | September 24, 2008 | Kitt Peak | Spacewatch | · | 1.4 km | MPC · JPL |
| 693292 | 2015 FQ_{227} | — | December 25, 2005 | Kitt Peak | Spacewatch | · | 1.0 km | MPC · JPL |
| 693293 | 2015 FF_{228} | — | March 23, 2015 | Haleakala | Pan-STARRS 1 | HOF | 1.7 km | MPC · JPL |
| 693294 | 2015 FW_{229} | — | November 9, 2013 | Haleakala | Pan-STARRS 1 | · | 770 m | MPC · JPL |
| 693295 | 2015 FW_{233} | — | March 23, 2015 | Haleakala | Pan-STARRS 1 | AEO | 990 m | MPC · JPL |
| 693296 | 2015 FV_{234} | — | August 26, 2012 | Kitt Peak | Spacewatch | · | 1.2 km | MPC · JPL |
| 693297 | 2015 FD_{235} | — | November 8, 2013 | Mount Lemmon | Mount Lemmon Survey | · | 1.3 km | MPC · JPL |
| 693298 | 2015 FR_{235} | — | February 16, 2015 | Haleakala | Pan-STARRS 1 | · | 1.5 km | MPC · JPL |
| 693299 | 2015 FB_{236} | — | February 27, 2015 | Haleakala | Pan-STARRS 1 | · | 1.3 km | MPC · JPL |
| 693300 | 2015 FH_{237} | — | September 23, 2008 | Mount Lemmon | Mount Lemmon Survey | · | 1.3 km | MPC · JPL |

== 693301–693400 ==
back to top

| Designation | | | Discovery | | | Properties | | Ref |
| Permanent | Provisional | Named after | Date | Site | Discoverer(s) | Category | Diam. | Ref |
|---|---|---|---|---|---|---|---|---|
| 693301 | 2015 FV_{237} | — | March 8, 2008 | Mount Lemmon | Mount Lemmon Survey | (2076) | 630 m | MPC · JPL |
| 693302 | 2015 FE_{238} | — | April 22, 2007 | Mount Lemmon | Mount Lemmon Survey | · | 960 m | MPC · JPL |
| 693303 | 2015 FM_{239} | — | February 18, 2015 | Haleakala | Pan-STARRS 1 | EUN | 1.1 km | MPC · JPL |
| 693304 | 2015 FS_{240} | — | November 28, 2013 | Mount Lemmon | Mount Lemmon Survey | · | 1.2 km | MPC · JPL |
| 693305 | 2015 FW_{240} | — | November 11, 2013 | Catalina | CSS | · | 1.4 km | MPC · JPL |
| 693306 | 2015 FU_{241} | — | January 21, 2015 | Haleakala | Pan-STARRS 1 | V | 550 m | MPC · JPL |
| 693307 | 2015 FZ_{242} | — | March 23, 2015 | Haleakala | Pan-STARRS 1 | AGN | 790 m | MPC · JPL |
| 693308 | 2015 FS_{245} | — | April 24, 2007 | Mount Lemmon | Mount Lemmon Survey | · | 990 m | MPC · JPL |
| 693309 | 2015 FE_{246} | — | March 23, 2015 | Haleakala | Pan-STARRS 1 | · | 1.7 km | MPC · JPL |
| 693310 | 2015 FJ_{246} | — | March 31, 2003 | Kitt Peak | Spacewatch | · | 1.0 km | MPC · JPL |
| 693311 | 2015 FF_{247} | — | April 5, 2011 | Kitt Peak | Spacewatch | · | 1.3 km | MPC · JPL |
| 693312 | 2015 FS_{247} | — | March 23, 2015 | Haleakala | Pan-STARRS 1 | · | 1.6 km | MPC · JPL |
| 693313 | 2015 FD_{248} | — | March 23, 2015 | Haleakala | Pan-STARRS 1 | · | 1.2 km | MPC · JPL |
| 693314 | 2015 FM_{248} | — | March 23, 2015 | Haleakala | Pan-STARRS 1 | · | 1.4 km | MPC · JPL |
| 693315 | 2015 FE_{249} | — | October 8, 2008 | Kitt Peak | Spacewatch | · | 1.6 km | MPC · JPL |
| 693316 | 2015 FE_{251} | — | January 23, 2015 | Haleakala | Pan-STARRS 1 | · | 1.3 km | MPC · JPL |
| 693317 | 2015 FG_{252} | — | March 23, 2015 | Haleakala | Pan-STARRS 1 | · | 1.4 km | MPC · JPL |
| 693318 | 2015 FP_{252} | — | March 23, 2015 | Haleakala | Pan-STARRS 1 | · | 1.5 km | MPC · JPL |
| 693319 | 2015 FZ_{252} | — | August 13, 2012 | Haleakala | Pan-STARRS 1 | · | 1.2 km | MPC · JPL |
| 693320 | 2015 FM_{254} | — | April 16, 2012 | Haleakala | Pan-STARRS 1 | · | 680 m | MPC · JPL |
| 693321 | 2015 FO_{254} | — | February 23, 2007 | Mount Lemmon | Mount Lemmon Survey | · | 1.0 km | MPC · JPL |
| 693322 | 2015 FC_{258} | — | October 1, 2013 | Kitt Peak | Spacewatch | · | 1.2 km | MPC · JPL |
| 693323 | 2015 FS_{258} | — | October 15, 2012 | Haleakala | Pan-STARRS 1 | · | 1.3 km | MPC · JPL |
| 693324 | 2015 FE_{259} | — | May 26, 2011 | Mount Lemmon | Mount Lemmon Survey | · | 1.2 km | MPC · JPL |
| 693325 | 2015 FY_{259} | — | September 27, 2008 | Mount Lemmon | Mount Lemmon Survey | PAD | 1.5 km | MPC · JPL |
| 693326 | 2015 FD_{260} | — | November 8, 2013 | Mount Lemmon | Mount Lemmon Survey | · | 1.3 km | MPC · JPL |
| 693327 | 2015 FV_{262} | — | March 1, 2011 | Mount Lemmon | Mount Lemmon Survey | · | 1.2 km | MPC · JPL |
| 693328 | 2015 FO_{263} | — | December 18, 2003 | Kitt Peak | Spacewatch | · | 600 m | MPC · JPL |
| 693329 | 2015 FY_{264} | — | April 15, 2007 | Kitt Peak | Spacewatch | · | 1.4 km | MPC · JPL |
| 693330 | 2015 FZ_{265} | — | October 12, 2013 | Kitt Peak | Spacewatch | · | 1.1 km | MPC · JPL |
| 693331 | 2015 FJ_{267} | — | February 16, 2015 | Haleakala | Pan-STARRS 1 | · | 1.4 km | MPC · JPL |
| 693332 | 2015 FZ_{268} | — | August 30, 2005 | Kitt Peak | Spacewatch | · | 1.1 km | MPC · JPL |
| 693333 | 2015 FR_{273} | — | October 2, 2008 | Mount Lemmon | Mount Lemmon Survey | · | 1.3 km | MPC · JPL |
| 693334 | 2015 FA_{278} | — | October 2, 2013 | Mount Lemmon | Mount Lemmon Survey | · | 1.4 km | MPC · JPL |
| 693335 | 2015 FX_{278} | — | November 11, 2013 | Kitt Peak | Spacewatch | NEM | 1.8 km | MPC · JPL |
| 693336 | 2015 FA_{280} | — | January 19, 2015 | Haleakala | Pan-STARRS 1 | · | 1.1 km | MPC · JPL |
| 693337 | 2015 FT_{281} | — | April 13, 2011 | Mount Lemmon | Mount Lemmon Survey | · | 1.5 km | MPC · JPL |
| 693338 | 2015 FB_{284} | — | November 4, 2013 | Haleakala | Pan-STARRS 1 | · | 1.3 km | MPC · JPL |
| 693339 | 2015 FK_{286} | — | March 25, 2015 | Haleakala | Pan-STARRS 1 | JUN | 960 m | MPC · JPL |
| 693340 | 2015 FF_{288} | — | January 28, 2015 | Haleakala | Pan-STARRS 1 | · | 1.0 km | MPC · JPL |
| 693341 | 2015 FD_{294} | — | January 28, 2015 | Haleakala | Pan-STARRS 1 | · | 1.5 km | MPC · JPL |
| 693342 | 2015 FO_{294} | — | August 4, 2011 | Siding Spring | SSS | · | 2.1 km | MPC · JPL |
| 693343 | 2015 FE_{299} | — | January 22, 2015 | Haleakala | Pan-STARRS 1 | · | 1.3 km | MPC · JPL |
| 693344 | 2015 FB_{300} | — | October 22, 2012 | Nogales | M. Schwartz, P. R. Holvorcem | · | 1.5 km | MPC · JPL |
| 693345 | 2015 FZ_{302} | — | March 28, 2015 | Haleakala | Pan-STARRS 1 | · | 1.6 km | MPC · JPL |
| 693346 | 2015 FX_{310} | — | January 23, 2015 | Haleakala | Pan-STARRS 1 | · | 1.3 km | MPC · JPL |
| 693347 | 2015 FB_{314} | — | March 25, 2015 | Haleakala | Pan-STARRS 1 | · | 1.6 km | MPC · JPL |
| 693348 | 2015 FM_{315} | — | October 16, 2012 | Mount Lemmon | Mount Lemmon Survey | · | 1.5 km | MPC · JPL |
| 693349 | 2015 FS_{315} | — | May 22, 2011 | Mount Lemmon | Mount Lemmon Survey | · | 1.6 km | MPC · JPL |
| 693350 | 2015 FM_{322} | — | November 14, 2013 | Mount Lemmon | Mount Lemmon Survey | EUN | 1.0 km | MPC · JPL |
| 693351 | 2015 FK_{323} | — | March 25, 2015 | Haleakala | Pan-STARRS 1 | · | 1.4 km | MPC · JPL |
| 693352 | 2015 FW_{323} | — | March 25, 2015 | Haleakala | Pan-STARRS 1 | · | 1.2 km | MPC · JPL |
| 693353 | 2015 FG_{324} | — | February 16, 2015 | Haleakala | Pan-STARRS 1 | · | 1.6 km | MPC · JPL |
| 693354 | 2015 FY_{328} | — | June 3, 2011 | Mount Lemmon | Mount Lemmon Survey | · | 1.4 km | MPC · JPL |
| 693355 | 2015 FG_{329} | — | March 25, 2015 | Haleakala | Pan-STARRS 1 | · | 1.4 km | MPC · JPL |
| 693356 | 2015 FP_{331} | — | December 10, 2009 | Mount Lemmon | Mount Lemmon Survey | · | 1.7 km | MPC · JPL |
| 693357 | 2015 FR_{331} | — | March 28, 2015 | Mount Lemmon | Mount Lemmon Survey | · | 1.6 km | MPC · JPL |
| 693358 | 2015 FV_{336} | — | March 30, 2015 | Haleakala | Pan-STARRS 1 | · | 1.6 km | MPC · JPL |
| 693359 | 2015 FX_{339} | — | February 20, 2015 | Haleakala | Pan-STARRS 1 | · | 2.0 km | MPC · JPL |
| 693360 | 2015 FC_{342} | — | December 25, 2006 | Kitt Peak | Spacewatch | · | 1.1 km | MPC · JPL |
| 693361 | 2015 FU_{342} | — | May 24, 2011 | Mount Lemmon | Mount Lemmon Survey | · | 1.5 km | MPC · JPL |
| 693362 | 2015 FN_{346} | — | March 10, 2007 | Mount Lemmon | Mount Lemmon Survey | · | 840 m | MPC · JPL |
| 693363 | 2015 FX_{348} | — | March 16, 2015 | Haleakala | Pan-STARRS 1 | · | 1.4 km | MPC · JPL |
| 693364 | 2015 FQ_{349} | — | January 11, 2010 | Mount Lemmon | Mount Lemmon Survey | · | 1.3 km | MPC · JPL |
| 693365 | 2015 FY_{349} | — | March 16, 2015 | Haleakala | Pan-STARRS 1 | · | 1.6 km | MPC · JPL |
| 693366 | 2015 FQ_{352} | — | March 17, 2015 | Haleakala | Pan-STARRS 1 | · | 1.4 km | MPC · JPL |
| 693367 | 2015 FA_{353} | — | March 17, 2015 | Haleakala | Pan-STARRS 1 | · | 1.5 km | MPC · JPL |
| 693368 | 2015 FQ_{353} | — | November 28, 2013 | Mount Lemmon | Mount Lemmon Survey | · | 1.4 km | MPC · JPL |
| 693369 | 2015 FH_{354} | — | March 17, 2015 | Haleakala | Pan-STARRS 1 | · | 1.3 km | MPC · JPL |
| 693370 | 2015 FM_{357} | — | March 17, 2015 | Haleakala | Pan-STARRS 1 | · | 1.2 km | MPC · JPL |
| 693371 | 2015 FN_{360} | — | October 15, 2012 | Haleakala | Pan-STARRS 1 | WIT | 890 m | MPC · JPL |
| 693372 | 2015 FA_{361} | — | October 15, 2012 | Haleakala | Pan-STARRS 1 | · | 1.4 km | MPC · JPL |
| 693373 | 2015 FD_{361} | — | October 18, 2012 | Haleakala | Pan-STARRS 1 | · | 1.6 km | MPC · JPL |
| 693374 | 2015 FQ_{362} | — | December 29, 2013 | Haleakala | Pan-STARRS 1 | · | 1.0 km | MPC · JPL |
| 693375 | 2015 FJ_{366} | — | January 20, 2015 | Haleakala | Pan-STARRS 1 | EUN | 1.2 km | MPC · JPL |
| 693376 | 2015 FA_{368} | — | February 20, 2015 | Haleakala | Pan-STARRS 1 | · | 1.4 km | MPC · JPL |
| 693377 | 2015 FY_{368} | — | November 29, 2013 | Mount Lemmon | Mount Lemmon Survey | · | 1.6 km | MPC · JPL |
| 693378 | 2015 FG_{370} | — | January 28, 2015 | Haleakala | Pan-STARRS 1 | JUN | 790 m | MPC · JPL |
| 693379 | 2015 FX_{375} | — | February 17, 2010 | Mount Lemmon | Mount Lemmon Survey | · | 1.5 km | MPC · JPL |
| 693380 | 2015 FG_{378} | — | December 13, 2013 | Mount Lemmon | Mount Lemmon Survey | · | 1.6 km | MPC · JPL |
| 693381 | 2015 FA_{382} | — | January 23, 2015 | Haleakala | Pan-STARRS 1 | · | 1.4 km | MPC · JPL |
| 693382 | 2015 FL_{383} | — | April 2, 2011 | Haleakala | Pan-STARRS 1 | · | 1.3 km | MPC · JPL |
| 693383 | 2015 FU_{393} | — | March 30, 2015 | Haleakala | Pan-STARRS 1 | H | 540 m | MPC · JPL |
| 693384 | 2015 FF_{395} | — | March 21, 2015 | Haleakala | Pan-STARRS 1 | · | 1.8 km | MPC · JPL |
| 693385 | 2015 FO_{396} | — | March 31, 2015 | Haleakala | Pan-STARRS 1 | · | 1.4 km | MPC · JPL |
| 693386 | 2015 FW_{396} | — | February 9, 2005 | Mount Lemmon | Mount Lemmon Survey | WIT | 900 m | MPC · JPL |
| 693387 | 2015 FA_{402} | — | November 8, 2007 | Kitt Peak | Spacewatch | · | 2.0 km | MPC · JPL |
| 693388 | 2015 FB_{403} | — | March 21, 2015 | Haleakala | Pan-STARRS 1 | · | 1.2 km | MPC · JPL |
| 693389 | 2015 FT_{410} | — | May 20, 2006 | Kitt Peak | Spacewatch | · | 1.5 km | MPC · JPL |
| 693390 | 2015 FS_{411} | — | October 20, 2012 | Haleakala | Pan-STARRS 1 | · | 1.5 km | MPC · JPL |
| 693391 | 2015 FG_{412} | — | March 28, 2015 | Haleakala | Pan-STARRS 1 | · | 1.5 km | MPC · JPL |
| 693392 | 2015 FS_{415} | — | March 28, 2015 | Haleakala | Pan-STARRS 1 | · | 2.7 km | MPC · JPL |
| 693393 | 2015 FN_{417} | — | March 25, 2015 | Haleakala | Pan-STARRS 1 | · | 1.4 km | MPC · JPL |
| 693394 | 2015 FU_{417} | — | March 20, 2015 | Haleakala | Pan-STARRS 1 | · | 1.6 km | MPC · JPL |
| 693395 | 2015 FB_{420} | — | March 28, 2015 | Haleakala | Pan-STARRS 1 | · | 820 m | MPC · JPL |
| 693396 | 2015 FT_{420} | — | November 2, 2000 | Kitt Peak | Spacewatch | JUN | 770 m | MPC · JPL |
| 693397 | 2015 FY_{425} | — | March 16, 2015 | Mount Lemmon | Mount Lemmon Survey | · | 1.6 km | MPC · JPL |
| 693398 | 2015 FB_{426} | — | March 25, 2015 | Haleakala | Pan-STARRS 1 | L4 | 6.9 km | MPC · JPL |
| 693399 | 2015 FX_{427} | — | March 29, 2015 | Haleakala | Pan-STARRS 1 | AEO | 900 m | MPC · JPL |
| 693400 | 2015 FV_{429} | — | March 17, 2015 | Haleakala | Pan-STARRS 1 | · | 1.5 km | MPC · JPL |

== 693401–693500 ==
back to top

| Designation | | | Discovery | | | Properties | | Ref |
| Permanent | Provisional | Named after | Date | Site | Discoverer(s) | Category | Diam. | Ref |
|---|---|---|---|---|---|---|---|---|
| 693401 | 2015 FB_{430} | — | March 17, 2015 | Mount Lemmon | Mount Lemmon Survey | · | 1.4 km | MPC · JPL |
| 693402 | 2015 FC_{432} | — | March 22, 2015 | Haleakala | Pan-STARRS 1 | · | 1.6 km | MPC · JPL |
| 693403 | 2015 FM_{432} | — | March 29, 2015 | Haleakala | Pan-STARRS 1 | HNS | 900 m | MPC · JPL |
| 693404 | 2015 FA_{434} | — | March 28, 2015 | Haleakala | Pan-STARRS 1 | EUN | 710 m | MPC · JPL |
| 693405 | 2015 FE_{434} | — | March 24, 2015 | Mount Lemmon | Mount Lemmon Survey | · | 1.3 km | MPC · JPL |
| 693406 | 2015 FJ_{434} | — | March 22, 2015 | Haleakala | Pan-STARRS 1 | · | 1.2 km | MPC · JPL |
| 693407 | 2015 FR_{436} | — | March 22, 2015 | Haleakala | Pan-STARRS 1 | H | 390 m | MPC · JPL |
| 693408 | 2015 FQ_{443} | — | March 16, 2015 | Mount Lemmon | Mount Lemmon Survey | · | 1.1 km | MPC · JPL |
| 693409 | 2015 FR_{444} | — | March 22, 2015 | Haleakala | Pan-STARRS 1 | · | 1.1 km | MPC · JPL |
| 693410 | 2015 FF_{448} | — | March 27, 2015 | Haleakala | Pan-STARRS 1 | · | 1.4 km | MPC · JPL |
| 693411 | 2015 FE_{449} | — | March 22, 2015 | Haleakala | Pan-STARRS 1 | · | 1.0 km | MPC · JPL |
| 693412 | 2015 FP_{450} | — | March 21, 2015 | Haleakala | Pan-STARRS 1 | · | 1.3 km | MPC · JPL |
| 693413 | 2015 FS_{450} | — | February 4, 2006 | Mount Lemmon | Mount Lemmon Survey | · | 1.4 km | MPC · JPL |
| 693414 | 2015 FV_{451} | — | March 21, 2015 | Haleakala | Pan-STARRS 1 | · | 1.3 km | MPC · JPL |
| 693415 | 2015 FX_{451} | — | March 19, 2015 | Cerro Paranal | Altmann, M., Prusti, T. | · | 910 m | MPC · JPL |
| 693416 | 2015 FC_{453} | — | March 17, 2015 | Haleakala | Pan-STARRS 1 | · | 1.7 km | MPC · JPL |
| 693417 | 2015 FN_{453} | — | March 28, 2015 | Haleakala | Pan-STARRS 1 | · | 1.9 km | MPC · JPL |
| 693418 | 2015 FE_{456} | — | April 4, 2002 | Palomar | NEAT | · | 1.2 km | MPC · JPL |
| 693419 | 2015 FZ_{456} | — | March 24, 2006 | Mount Lemmon | Mount Lemmon Survey | · | 1.4 km | MPC · JPL |
| 693420 | 2015 FG_{457} | — | March 21, 2015 | Haleakala | Pan-STARRS 1 | · | 1.6 km | MPC · JPL |
| 693421 | 2015 FR_{459} | — | April 25, 2004 | Kitt Peak | Spacewatch | L4 | 6.5 km | MPC · JPL |
| 693422 | 2015 FY_{460} | — | March 16, 2015 | Kitt Peak | Spacewatch | · | 1.3 km | MPC · JPL |
| 693423 | 2015 FC_{470} | — | March 21, 2015 | Haleakala | Pan-STARRS 1 | · | 1.5 km | MPC · JPL |
| 693424 | 2015 FD_{475} | — | March 22, 2015 | Mount Lemmon | Mount Lemmon Survey | · | 1.2 km | MPC · JPL |
| 693425 | 2015 GA_{3} | — | March 22, 2015 | Haleakala | Pan-STARRS 1 | · | 1.0 km | MPC · JPL |
| 693426 | 2015 GJ_{6} | — | January 4, 2006 | Kitt Peak | Spacewatch | · | 1.4 km | MPC · JPL |
| 693427 | 2015 GH_{9} | — | March 17, 2015 | Haleakala | Pan-STARRS 1 | EUN | 810 m | MPC · JPL |
| 693428 | 2015 GT_{9} | — | November 10, 2005 | Kitt Peak | Spacewatch | · | 1.2 km | MPC · JPL |
| 693429 | 2015 GQ_{10} | — | April 12, 2015 | Haleakala | Pan-STARRS 1 | MAR | 970 m | MPC · JPL |
| 693430 | 2015 GO_{12} | — | December 10, 2013 | Mount Lemmon | Mount Lemmon Survey | HNS | 1.1 km | MPC · JPL |
| 693431 | 2015 GM_{14} | — | February 27, 2015 | Haleakala | Pan-STARRS 1 | · | 1.7 km | MPC · JPL |
| 693432 | 2015 GD_{15} | — | March 4, 2006 | Mount Lemmon | Mount Lemmon Survey | · | 1.4 km | MPC · JPL |
| 693433 | 2015 GF_{15} | — | October 8, 2012 | Mount Lemmon | Mount Lemmon Survey | EUN | 860 m | MPC · JPL |
| 693434 | 2015 GO_{18} | — | December 4, 2013 | Haleakala | Pan-STARRS 1 | MAR | 1.0 km | MPC · JPL |
| 693435 | 2015 GX_{23} | — | April 12, 2015 | Haleakala | Pan-STARRS 1 | · | 1.9 km | MPC · JPL |
| 693436 | 2015 GL_{28} | — | March 14, 2010 | Mount Lemmon | Mount Lemmon Survey | · | 1.5 km | MPC · JPL |
| 693437 | 2015 GL_{32} | — | September 4, 2007 | Mount Lemmon | Mount Lemmon Survey | EUN | 930 m | MPC · JPL |
| 693438 | 2015 GB_{34} | — | April 13, 2015 | Haleakala | Pan-STARRS 1 | · | 1.4 km | MPC · JPL |
| 693439 | 2015 GX_{40} | — | October 18, 2012 | Haleakala | Pan-STARRS 1 | · | 1.4 km | MPC · JPL |
| 693440 | 2015 GZ_{40} | — | April 4, 2006 | Campo Imperatore | CINEOS | · | 1.4 km | MPC · JPL |
| 693441 | 2015 GG_{44} | — | April 4, 2003 | Kitt Peak | Spacewatch | · | 910 m | MPC · JPL |
| 693442 | 2015 GU_{44} | — | March 25, 2015 | Haleakala | Pan-STARRS 1 | · | 1.4 km | MPC · JPL |
| 693443 | 2015 GN_{48} | — | August 10, 2007 | Kitt Peak | Spacewatch | · | 1.5 km | MPC · JPL |
| 693444 | 2015 GW_{51} | — | April 13, 2015 | Haleakala | Pan-STARRS 1 | · | 1.1 km | MPC · JPL |
| 693445 | 2015 GG_{52} | — | April 13, 2015 | Haleakala | Pan-STARRS 1 | · | 1.5 km | MPC · JPL |
| 693446 | 2015 GR_{52} | — | January 20, 2015 | Haleakala | Pan-STARRS 1 | · | 980 m | MPC · JPL |
| 693447 | 2015 GT_{53} | — | April 15, 2015 | Kitt Peak | Wasserman, L. H., M. W. Buie | KOR | 1.1 km | MPC · JPL |
| 693448 | 2015 GW_{53} | — | April 15, 2015 | Haleakala | Pan-STARRS 1 | · | 1.2 km | MPC · JPL |
| 693449 | 2015 GA_{63} | — | April 15, 2015 | Haleakala | Pan-STARRS 1 | · | 1.5 km | MPC · JPL |
| 693450 | 2015 GM_{67} | — | April 15, 2015 | Mount Lemmon | Mount Lemmon Survey | · | 1.4 km | MPC · JPL |
| 693451 | 2015 GN_{67} | — | April 10, 2015 | Mount Lemmon | Mount Lemmon Survey | · | 1.3 km | MPC · JPL |
| 693452 | 2015 GU_{67} | — | April 10, 2015 | Mount Lemmon | Mount Lemmon Survey | · | 1.2 km | MPC · JPL |
| 693453 | 2015 GP_{68} | — | April 1, 2015 | Mount Lemmon | Mount Lemmon Survey | · | 1.6 km | MPC · JPL |
| 693454 | 2015 GS_{68} | — | April 9, 2015 | Mount Lemmon | Mount Lemmon Survey | · | 1.1 km | MPC · JPL |
| 693455 | 2015 GO_{69} | — | April 13, 2015 | Mount Lemmon | Mount Lemmon Survey | · | 1.2 km | MPC · JPL |
| 693456 | 2015 GH_{71} | — | September 26, 2008 | Kitt Peak | Spacewatch | · | 1.5 km | MPC · JPL |
| 693457 | 2015 HT_{2} | — | September 21, 2008 | Mount Lemmon | Mount Lemmon Survey | EUN | 1.4 km | MPC · JPL |
| 693458 | 2015 HL_{3} | — | April 16, 2015 | Haleakala | Pan-STARRS 1 | · | 1.5 km | MPC · JPL |
| 693459 | 2015 HW_{3} | — | September 29, 2008 | Mount Lemmon | Mount Lemmon Survey | · | 1.1 km | MPC · JPL |
| 693460 | 2015 HJ_{5} | — | May 2, 2006 | Mount Lemmon | Mount Lemmon Survey | TIN | 860 m | MPC · JPL |
| 693461 | 2015 HK_{5} | — | May 13, 2011 | Mount Lemmon | Mount Lemmon Survey | · | 1.6 km | MPC · JPL |
| 693462 | 2015 HP_{6} | — | April 10, 2015 | Haleakala | Pan-STARRS 1 | · | 1.2 km | MPC · JPL |
| 693463 | 2015 HB_{7} | — | February 16, 2015 | Haleakala | Pan-STARRS 1 | · | 1.5 km | MPC · JPL |
| 693464 | 2015 HU_{8} | — | March 29, 2011 | Catalina | CSS | ADE | 1.7 km | MPC · JPL |
| 693465 | 2015 HU_{13} | — | April 15, 2015 | Mount Lemmon | Mount Lemmon Survey | · | 1.6 km | MPC · JPL |
| 693466 | 2015 HO_{16} | — | December 22, 2008 | Kitt Peak | Spacewatch | KOR | 1.2 km | MPC · JPL |
| 693467 | 2015 HV_{17} | — | March 22, 2015 | Kitt Peak | Spacewatch | · | 1.5 km | MPC · JPL |
| 693468 | 2015 HQ_{18} | — | January 5, 2002 | Kitt Peak | Spacewatch | · | 1.0 km | MPC · JPL |
| 693469 | 2015 HU_{18} | — | April 11, 2015 | Mount Lemmon | Mount Lemmon Survey | · | 1.3 km | MPC · JPL |
| 693470 | 2015 HU_{19} | — | December 28, 2013 | Kitt Peak | Spacewatch | · | 1.5 km | MPC · JPL |
| 693471 | 2015 HR_{20} | — | February 16, 2010 | Kitt Peak | Spacewatch | AGN | 950 m | MPC · JPL |
| 693472 | 2015 HN_{24} | — | October 2, 2008 | Mount Lemmon | Mount Lemmon Survey | AEO | 1.1 km | MPC · JPL |
| 693473 | 2015 HW_{27} | — | April 29, 2003 | Kitt Peak | Spacewatch | · | 700 m | MPC · JPL |
| 693474 | 2015 HQ_{28} | — | October 16, 2006 | Catalina | CSS | · | 650 m | MPC · JPL |
| 693475 | 2015 HX_{33} | — | January 27, 2007 | Mount Lemmon | Mount Lemmon Survey | · | 1 km | MPC · JPL |
| 693476 | 2015 HA_{36} | — | January 28, 2015 | Haleakala | Pan-STARRS 1 | · | 1.7 km | MPC · JPL |
| 693477 | 2015 HC_{36} | — | May 1, 2011 | Haleakala | Pan-STARRS 1 | · | 1.2 km | MPC · JPL |
| 693478 | 2015 HC_{39} | — | April 20, 2015 | Haleakala | Pan-STARRS 1 | 615 | 970 m | MPC · JPL |
| 693479 | 2015 HK_{40} | — | March 21, 2015 | Haleakala | Pan-STARRS 1 | · | 1.3 km | MPC · JPL |
| 693480 | 2015 HG_{45} | — | March 25, 2015 | Haleakala | Pan-STARRS 1 | · | 1.2 km | MPC · JPL |
| 693481 | 2015 HU_{45} | — | December 25, 2013 | Mount Lemmon | Mount Lemmon Survey | · | 1.5 km | MPC · JPL |
| 693482 | 2015 HQ_{48} | — | April 16, 2015 | Haleakala | Pan-STARRS 1 | GEF | 960 m | MPC · JPL |
| 693483 | 2015 HS_{49} | — | February 23, 2015 | Haleakala | Pan-STARRS 1 | HNS | 780 m | MPC · JPL |
| 693484 | 2015 HW_{49} | — | March 25, 2015 | Haleakala | Pan-STARRS 1 | · | 1.4 km | MPC · JPL |
| 693485 | 2015 HH_{50} | — | January 25, 2015 | Haleakala | Pan-STARRS 1 | · | 1.6 km | MPC · JPL |
| 693486 | 2015 HD_{51} | — | March 31, 2011 | Mount Lemmon | Mount Lemmon Survey | MAR | 930 m | MPC · JPL |
| 693487 | 2015 HO_{54} | — | April 18, 2015 | Haleakala | Pan-STARRS 1 | · | 1.1 km | MPC · JPL |
| 693488 | 2015 HW_{59} | — | February 25, 2007 | Mount Lemmon | Mount Lemmon Survey | · | 1.2 km | MPC · JPL |
| 693489 | 2015 HB_{60} | — | April 18, 2015 | Haleakala | Pan-STARRS 1 | EUN | 930 m | MPC · JPL |
| 693490 | 2015 HU_{60} | — | April 18, 2015 | Haleakala | Pan-STARRS 1 | EUN | 1.1 km | MPC · JPL |
| 693491 | 2015 HZ_{65} | — | April 5, 2011 | Kitt Peak | Spacewatch | · | 1.0 km | MPC · JPL |
| 693492 | 2015 HK_{66} | — | April 23, 2015 | Haleakala | Pan-STARRS 1 | · | 1.3 km | MPC · JPL |
| 693493 | 2015 HE_{67} | — | November 19, 2008 | Mount Lemmon | Mount Lemmon Survey | WIT | 690 m | MPC · JPL |
| 693494 | 2015 HX_{67} | — | April 23, 2015 | Haleakala | Pan-STARRS 1 | KOR | 1.0 km | MPC · JPL |
| 693495 | 2015 HQ_{71} | — | August 26, 2011 | Haleakala | Pan-STARRS 1 | EOS | 1.6 km | MPC · JPL |
| 693496 | 2015 HC_{76} | — | April 19, 2015 | Mount Lemmon | Mount Lemmon Survey | · | 960 m | MPC · JPL |
| 693497 | 2015 HE_{77} | — | September 30, 2003 | Kitt Peak | Spacewatch | · | 1.5 km | MPC · JPL |
| 693498 | 2015 HY_{77} | — | September 18, 2009 | Mount Lemmon | Mount Lemmon Survey | NYS | 950 m | MPC · JPL |
| 693499 | 2015 HG_{79} | — | April 12, 2011 | Mount Lemmon | Mount Lemmon Survey | · | 1.3 km | MPC · JPL |
| 693500 | 2015 HO_{80} | — | April 23, 2015 | Haleakala | Pan-STARRS 1 | · | 1.3 km | MPC · JPL |

== 693501–693600 ==
back to top

| Designation | | | Discovery | | | Properties | | Ref |
| Permanent | Provisional | Named after | Date | Site | Discoverer(s) | Category | Diam. | Ref |
|---|---|---|---|---|---|---|---|---|
| 693501 | 2015 HB_{81} | — | October 15, 2012 | Haleakala | Pan-STARRS 1 | · | 1.4 km | MPC · JPL |
| 693502 | 2015 HT_{83} | — | May 21, 2006 | Kitt Peak | Spacewatch | · | 1.5 km | MPC · JPL |
| 693503 | 2015 HJ_{85} | — | March 10, 2011 | Kitt Peak | Spacewatch | · | 1.0 km | MPC · JPL |
| 693504 | 2015 HC_{87} | — | November 27, 2006 | Mount Lemmon | Mount Lemmon Survey | ERI | 1.6 km | MPC · JPL |
| 693505 | 2015 HW_{89} | — | October 1, 2005 | Mount Lemmon | Mount Lemmon Survey | MAS | 600 m | MPC · JPL |
| 693506 | 2015 HY_{89} | — | April 23, 2015 | Haleakala | Pan-STARRS 1 | GEF | 850 m | MPC · JPL |
| 693507 | 2015 HH_{92} | — | November 25, 2005 | Mount Lemmon | Mount Lemmon Survey | · | 1.2 km | MPC · JPL |
| 693508 | 2015 HT_{93} | — | October 18, 2012 | Haleakala | Pan-STARRS 1 | HOF | 2.4 km | MPC · JPL |
| 693509 | 2015 HT_{98} | — | October 11, 2012 | Haleakala | Pan-STARRS 1 | PAD | 1.2 km | MPC · JPL |
| 693510 | 2015 HW_{98} | — | March 17, 2015 | Haleakala | Pan-STARRS 1 | · | 1.5 km | MPC · JPL |
| 693511 | 2015 HS_{99} | — | September 10, 2007 | Mount Lemmon | Mount Lemmon Survey | NEM | 1.7 km | MPC · JPL |
| 693512 | 2015 HW_{100} | — | August 10, 2007 | Kitt Peak | Spacewatch | NEM | 1.8 km | MPC · JPL |
| 693513 | 2015 HW_{101} | — | April 23, 2015 | Haleakala | Pan-STARRS 1 | · | 1.3 km | MPC · JPL |
| 693514 | 2015 HZ_{103} | — | December 20, 2009 | Mount Lemmon | Mount Lemmon Survey | · | 1 km | MPC · JPL |
| 693515 | 2015 HN_{104} | — | April 18, 2015 | Mount Lemmon | Mount Lemmon Survey | · | 1.5 km | MPC · JPL |
| 693516 | 2015 HY_{105} | — | April 13, 2015 | Haleakala | Pan-STARRS 1 | · | 1.3 km | MPC · JPL |
| 693517 | 2015 HL_{107} | — | April 13, 2015 | Haleakala | Pan-STARRS 1 | · | 1.4 km | MPC · JPL |
| 693518 | 2015 HT_{107} | — | February 13, 2010 | Mount Lemmon | Mount Lemmon Survey | · | 1.5 km | MPC · JPL |
| 693519 | 2015 HL_{108} | — | April 23, 2015 | Haleakala | Pan-STARRS 1 | · | 1.1 km | MPC · JPL |
| 693520 | 2015 HU_{110} | — | January 30, 2015 | Haleakala | Pan-STARRS 1 | · | 1.7 km | MPC · JPL |
| 693521 | 2015 HV_{111} | — | February 14, 2010 | Mount Lemmon | Mount Lemmon Survey | · | 1.4 km | MPC · JPL |
| 693522 | 2015 HK_{114} | — | April 16, 2015 | Haleakala | Pan-STARRS 1 | · | 1.2 km | MPC · JPL |
| 693523 | 2015 HO_{115} | — | August 16, 2007 | XuYi | PMO NEO Survey Program | · | 2.0 km | MPC · JPL |
| 693524 | 2015 HQ_{115} | — | April 23, 2015 | Haleakala | Pan-STARRS 1 | · | 1.4 km | MPC · JPL |
| 693525 | 2015 HL_{118} | — | September 16, 2009 | Kitt Peak | Spacewatch | L4 | 6.2 km | MPC · JPL |
| 693526 | 2015 HZ_{122} | — | April 19, 2015 | Mount Lemmon | Mount Lemmon Survey | · | 1.4 km | MPC · JPL |
| 693527 | 2015 HD_{124} | — | April 23, 2015 | Haleakala | Pan-STARRS 1 | · | 1.3 km | MPC · JPL |
| 693528 | 2015 HB_{129} | — | October 10, 2007 | Kitt Peak | Spacewatch | · | 1.6 km | MPC · JPL |
| 693529 | 2015 HK_{129} | — | August 24, 2007 | Kitt Peak | Spacewatch | · | 1.7 km | MPC · JPL |
| 693530 | 2015 HP_{129} | — | July 21, 2006 | Mount Lemmon | Mount Lemmon Survey | · | 730 m | MPC · JPL |
| 693531 | 2015 HQ_{129} | — | April 23, 2015 | Haleakala | Pan-STARRS 1 | · | 1.0 km | MPC · JPL |
| 693532 | 2015 HP_{130} | — | November 1, 2008 | Mount Lemmon | Mount Lemmon Survey | · | 1.5 km | MPC · JPL |
| 693533 | 2015 HZ_{130} | — | April 23, 2015 | Haleakala | Pan-STARRS 1 | · | 1.5 km | MPC · JPL |
| 693534 | 2015 HL_{131} | — | October 8, 2007 | Mount Lemmon | Mount Lemmon Survey | KOR | 1.1 km | MPC · JPL |
| 693535 | 2015 HS_{135} | — | April 23, 2015 | Haleakala | Pan-STARRS 1 | · | 1.2 km | MPC · JPL |
| 693536 | 2015 HU_{135} | — | February 16, 2013 | Mount Lemmon | Mount Lemmon Survey | L4 | 6.5 km | MPC · JPL |
| 693537 | 2015 HG_{136} | — | April 23, 2015 | Haleakala | Pan-STARRS 1 | · | 1.3 km | MPC · JPL |
| 693538 | 2015 HO_{137} | — | January 1, 2014 | Kitt Peak | Spacewatch | · | 960 m | MPC · JPL |
| 693539 | 2015 HV_{137} | — | April 23, 2015 | Haleakala | Pan-STARRS 1 | · | 1.3 km | MPC · JPL |
| 693540 | 2015 HJ_{138} | — | September 17, 2012 | Mount Lemmon | Mount Lemmon Survey | · | 1.4 km | MPC · JPL |
| 693541 | 2015 HR_{140} | — | October 9, 2012 | Mount Lemmon | Mount Lemmon Survey | WIT | 740 m | MPC · JPL |
| 693542 | 2015 HH_{141} | — | December 11, 2013 | Haleakala | Pan-STARRS 1 | · | 1.2 km | MPC · JPL |
| 693543 | 2015 HL_{142} | — | November 30, 2005 | Kitt Peak | Spacewatch | · | 1.0 km | MPC · JPL |
| 693544 | 2015 HJ_{147} | — | October 14, 2012 | Kitt Peak | Spacewatch | · | 1.5 km | MPC · JPL |
| 693545 | 2015 HB_{148} | — | April 23, 2015 | Haleakala | Pan-STARRS 1 | · | 1.2 km | MPC · JPL |
| 693546 | 2015 HO_{148} | — | August 10, 2007 | Kitt Peak | Spacewatch | · | 1.5 km | MPC · JPL |
| 693547 | 2015 HC_{150} | — | March 25, 2015 | Mount Lemmon | Mount Lemmon Survey | AGN | 1.2 km | MPC · JPL |
| 693548 | 2015 HL_{151} | — | November 30, 2008 | Kitt Peak | Spacewatch | · | 1.7 km | MPC · JPL |
| 693549 | 2015 HP_{153} | — | October 20, 2012 | Haleakala | Pan-STARRS 1 | · | 1.7 km | MPC · JPL |
| 693550 | 2015 HN_{158} | — | April 24, 2015 | Haleakala | Pan-STARRS 1 | NEM | 1.5 km | MPC · JPL |
| 693551 | 2015 HX_{161} | — | October 9, 2012 | Mount Lemmon | Mount Lemmon Survey | · | 1.2 km | MPC · JPL |
| 693552 | 2015 HN_{163} | — | April 8, 2006 | Kitt Peak | Spacewatch | MRX | 800 m | MPC · JPL |
| 693553 | 2015 HB_{167} | — | February 15, 2010 | Kitt Peak | Spacewatch | DOR | 1.6 km | MPC · JPL |
| 693554 | 2015 HW_{167} | — | September 17, 2012 | Kitt Peak | Spacewatch | · | 1.5 km | MPC · JPL |
| 693555 | 2015 HV_{172} | — | February 26, 2011 | Mount Lemmon | Mount Lemmon Survey | MAS | 670 m | MPC · JPL |
| 693556 | 2015 HM_{175} | — | March 22, 2015 | Kitt Peak | Spacewatch | · | 1.3 km | MPC · JPL |
| 693557 | 2015 HQ_{184} | — | April 19, 2015 | Kitt Peak | Spacewatch | · | 1.6 km | MPC · JPL |
| 693558 | 2015 HX_{184} | — | April 23, 2015 | Haleakala | Pan-STARRS 1 | EOS | 1.3 km | MPC · JPL |
| 693559 | 2015 HR_{186} | — | April 22, 2015 | Kitt Peak | Spacewatch | · | 1.4 km | MPC · JPL |
| 693560 | 2015 HD_{188} | — | December 30, 2008 | Mount Lemmon | Mount Lemmon Survey | · | 1.9 km | MPC · JPL |
| 693561 | 2015 HZ_{189} | — | April 19, 2015 | Kitt Peak | Spacewatch | · | 1.7 km | MPC · JPL |
| 693562 | 2015 HL_{191} | — | April 23, 2015 | Haleakala | Pan-STARRS 2 | · | 1.4 km | MPC · JPL |
| 693563 | 2015 HM_{199} | — | April 18, 2015 | Haleakala | Pan-STARRS 1 | · | 1.3 km | MPC · JPL |
| 693564 | 2015 HP_{204} | — | April 20, 2015 | Haleakala | Pan-STARRS 1 | · | 1.5 km | MPC · JPL |
| 693565 | 2015 HD_{209} | — | April 23, 2015 | Haleakala | Pan-STARRS 1 | · | 1.6 km | MPC · JPL |
| 693566 | 2015 HE_{209} | — | April 17, 2015 | Mount Lemmon | Mount Lemmon Survey | · | 1.2 km | MPC · JPL |
| 693567 | 2015 HT_{209} | — | April 23, 2015 | Haleakala | Pan-STARRS 1 | · | 1.3 km | MPC · JPL |
| 693568 | 2015 HB_{212} | — | April 24, 2015 | Haleakala | Pan-STARRS 1 | · | 1.3 km | MPC · JPL |
| 693569 | 2015 HL_{212} | — | April 19, 2015 | Kitt Peak | Spacewatch | · | 1.8 km | MPC · JPL |
| 693570 | 2015 HR_{212} | — | September 4, 2002 | Palomar | NEAT | · | 1.1 km | MPC · JPL |
| 693571 | 2015 HZ_{213} | — | April 25, 2015 | Haleakala | Pan-STARRS 1 | · | 1.5 km | MPC · JPL |
| 693572 | 2015 HG_{214} | — | April 20, 2015 | Haleakala | Pan-STARRS 1 | · | 1.6 km | MPC · JPL |
| 693573 | 2015 HA_{221} | — | April 23, 2015 | Haleakala | Pan-STARRS 1 | · | 1.6 km | MPC · JPL |
| 693574 | 2015 HY_{224} | — | April 23, 2015 | Haleakala | Pan-STARRS 1 | · | 1.2 km | MPC · JPL |
| 693575 | 2015 HK_{225} | — | April 25, 2015 | Haleakala | Pan-STARRS 1 | · | 1.4 km | MPC · JPL |
| 693576 | 2015 HZ_{233} | — | October 26, 2008 | Kitt Peak | Spacewatch | · | 1 km | MPC · JPL |
| 693577 | 2015 HH_{236} | — | April 18, 2015 | Cerro Tololo | DECam | · | 1.2 km | MPC · JPL |
| 693578 | 2015 HE_{249} | — | April 18, 2015 | Cerro Tololo | DECam | · | 1.2 km | MPC · JPL |
| 693579 | 2015 HD_{263} | — | July 28, 2011 | Haleakala | Pan-STARRS 1 | · | 1.4 km | MPC · JPL |
| 693580 | 2015 HL_{267} | — | April 18, 2015 | Cerro Tololo | DECam | · | 1.2 km | MPC · JPL |
| 693581 | 2015 HO_{302} | — | April 23, 2015 | Haleakala | Pan-STARRS 1 | AST | 1.2 km | MPC · JPL |
| 693582 | 2015 HM_{306} | — | April 20, 2015 | Haleakala | Pan-STARRS 1 | · | 1.2 km | MPC · JPL |
| 693583 | 2015 HQ_{332} | — | August 1, 2016 | Haleakala | Pan-STARRS 1 | AGN | 850 m | MPC · JPL |
| 693584 | 2015 HQ_{348} | — | April 18, 2015 | Cerro Tololo | DECam | · | 1.9 km | MPC · JPL |
| 693585 | 2015 JZ_{2} | — | March 29, 2011 | Catalina | CSS | BAR | 1.2 km | MPC · JPL |
| 693586 | 2015 JA_{5} | — | October 23, 2012 | Haleakala | Pan-STARRS 1 | · | 1.7 km | MPC · JPL |
| 693587 | 2015 JB_{6} | — | July 17, 2004 | Cerro Tololo | Deep Ecliptic Survey | · | 1.3 km | MPC · JPL |
| 693588 | 2015 JM_{8} | — | October 8, 2012 | Charleston | R. Holmes | EUN | 1.0 km | MPC · JPL |
| 693589 | 2015 JO_{9} | — | May 15, 2015 | Haleakala | Pan-STARRS 1 | · | 1.6 km | MPC · JPL |
| 693590 | 2015 JX_{9} | — | March 11, 2005 | Kitt Peak | Spacewatch | AGN | 1.2 km | MPC · JPL |
| 693591 | 2015 JT_{13} | — | May 11, 2015 | Mount Lemmon | Mount Lemmon Survey | AGN | 940 m | MPC · JPL |
| 693592 | 2015 JQ_{14} | — | May 11, 2015 | Mount Lemmon | Mount Lemmon Survey | · | 1.5 km | MPC · JPL |
| 693593 | 2015 JO_{21} | — | May 11, 2015 | Haleakala | Pan-STARRS 1 | EUN | 810 m | MPC · JPL |
| 693594 | 2015 JO_{24} | — | May 11, 2015 | Mount Lemmon | Mount Lemmon Survey | · | 1.5 km | MPC · JPL |
| 693595 | 2015 JH_{26} | — | May 13, 2015 | Mount Lemmon | Mount Lemmon Survey | · | 1.4 km | MPC · JPL |
| 693596 | 2015 JA_{27} | — | May 12, 2015 | Mount Lemmon | Mount Lemmon Survey | · | 1.5 km | MPC · JPL |
| 693597 | 2015 JP_{28} | — | August 10, 2007 | Kitt Peak | Spacewatch | · | 1.3 km | MPC · JPL |
| 693598 | 2015 JS_{28} | — | May 10, 2015 | Mount Lemmon | Mount Lemmon Survey | · | 1.2 km | MPC · JPL |
| 693599 | 2015 KY | — | September 9, 2012 | Črni Vrh | Mikuž, B. | EUN | 1.2 km | MPC · JPL |
| 693600 | 2015 KX_{3} | — | January 28, 2015 | Haleakala | Pan-STARRS 1 | · | 1.5 km | MPC · JPL |

== 693601–693700 ==
back to top

| Designation | | | Discovery | | | Properties | | Ref |
| Permanent | Provisional | Named after | Date | Site | Discoverer(s) | Category | Diam. | Ref |
|---|---|---|---|---|---|---|---|---|
| 693601 | 2015 KU_{6} | — | December 11, 2012 | Mount Lemmon | Mount Lemmon Survey | EUN | 1.2 km | MPC · JPL |
| 693602 | 2015 KU_{8} | — | October 30, 2007 | Mount Lemmon | Mount Lemmon Survey | · | 1.7 km | MPC · JPL |
| 693603 | 2015 KT_{9} | — | June 7, 2011 | Mount Lemmon | Mount Lemmon Survey | MAR | 1.0 km | MPC · JPL |
| 693604 | 2015 KN_{11} | — | September 20, 2011 | Zelenchukskaya Stn | T. V. Krjačko, Satovski, B. | TIN | 820 m | MPC · JPL |
| 693605 | 2015 KR_{11} | — | May 24, 2001 | Apache Point | SDSS | · | 1.8 km | MPC · JPL |
| 693606 | 2015 KZ_{11} | — | May 18, 2015 | Haleakala | Pan-STARRS 1 | · | 1.4 km | MPC · JPL |
| 693607 | 2015 KH_{12} | — | August 10, 2011 | Haleakala | Pan-STARRS 1 | · | 2.0 km | MPC · JPL |
| 693608 | 2015 KA_{16} | — | May 18, 2015 | Haleakala | Pan-STARRS 1 | · | 1.2 km | MPC · JPL |
| 693609 | 2015 KZ_{16} | — | May 18, 2015 | Haleakala | Pan-STARRS 1 | · | 1.5 km | MPC · JPL |
| 693610 | 2015 KH_{18} | — | January 7, 2014 | Kitt Peak | Spacewatch | · | 1.7 km | MPC · JPL |
| 693611 | 2015 KU_{20} | — | February 27, 2015 | Haleakala | Pan-STARRS 1 | · | 1.5 km | MPC · JPL |
| 693612 | 2015 KB_{21} | — | May 15, 2015 | Haleakala | Pan-STARRS 1 | · | 2.1 km | MPC · JPL |
| 693613 | 2015 KG_{22} | — | December 7, 2002 | Palomar | NEAT | · | 840 m | MPC · JPL |
| 693614 | 2015 KF_{23} | — | May 18, 2015 | Mount Lemmon | Mount Lemmon Survey | · | 1.6 km | MPC · JPL |
| 693615 | 2015 KX_{27} | — | December 5, 2008 | Kitt Peak | Spacewatch | · | 1.7 km | MPC · JPL |
| 693616 | 2015 KH_{32} | — | October 16, 2003 | Kitt Peak | Spacewatch | · | 680 m | MPC · JPL |
| 693617 | 2015 KG_{34} | — | September 10, 2007 | Mount Lemmon | Mount Lemmon Survey | · | 1.5 km | MPC · JPL |
| 693618 | 2015 KL_{34} | — | April 23, 2015 | Haleakala | Pan-STARRS 1 | · | 1.7 km | MPC · JPL |
| 693619 | 2015 KX_{34} | — | October 20, 2003 | Kitt Peak | Spacewatch | · | 1.9 km | MPC · JPL |
| 693620 | 2015 KY_{35} | — | June 17, 2006 | Kitt Peak | Spacewatch | · | 1.3 km | MPC · JPL |
| 693621 | 2015 KM_{37} | — | April 11, 2010 | Mount Lemmon | Mount Lemmon Survey | · | 1.3 km | MPC · JPL |
| 693622 | 2015 KZ_{38} | — | October 17, 2012 | Haleakala | Pan-STARRS 1 | · | 1.5 km | MPC · JPL |
| 693623 | 2015 KF_{39} | — | October 15, 2007 | Mount Lemmon | Mount Lemmon Survey | · | 1.3 km | MPC · JPL |
| 693624 | 2015 KC_{40} | — | December 28, 2013 | Kitt Peak | Spacewatch | · | 1.5 km | MPC · JPL |
| 693625 | 2015 KO_{40} | — | May 20, 2015 | Haleakala | Pan-STARRS 1 | · | 1.5 km | MPC · JPL |
| 693626 | 2015 KO_{43} | — | November 2, 2007 | Mount Lemmon | Mount Lemmon Survey | AGN | 1.1 km | MPC · JPL |
| 693627 | 2015 KQ_{44} | — | May 20, 2015 | Haleakala | Pan-STARRS 1 | ADE | 1.9 km | MPC · JPL |
| 693628 | 2015 KP_{45} | — | January 1, 2009 | Mount Lemmon | Mount Lemmon Survey | · | 1.6 km | MPC · JPL |
| 693629 | 2015 KB_{46} | — | May 2, 2006 | Mount Lemmon | Mount Lemmon Survey | · | 1.5 km | MPC · JPL |
| 693630 | 2015 KH_{47} | — | May 20, 2015 | Haleakala | Pan-STARRS 1 | · | 1.5 km | MPC · JPL |
| 693631 | 2015 KG_{49} | — | March 21, 2015 | Haleakala | Pan-STARRS 1 | · | 1.4 km | MPC · JPL |
| 693632 | 2015 KK_{50} | — | May 20, 2015 | Haleakala | Pan-STARRS 1 | · | 2.0 km | MPC · JPL |
| 693633 | 2015 KQ_{50} | — | October 11, 2007 | Mount Lemmon | Mount Lemmon Survey | · | 2.1 km | MPC · JPL |
| 693634 | 2015 KP_{54} | — | January 2, 2009 | Mount Lemmon | Mount Lemmon Survey | HOF | 2.1 km | MPC · JPL |
| 693635 | 2015 KA_{59} | — | May 13, 2011 | Mount Lemmon | Mount Lemmon Survey | · | 1.3 km | MPC · JPL |
| 693636 | 2015 KO_{59} | — | April 23, 2015 | Haleakala | Pan-STARRS 1 | GEF | 1.0 km | MPC · JPL |
| 693637 | 2015 KE_{61} | — | October 8, 2013 | Mount Lemmon | Mount Lemmon Survey | · | 1.5 km | MPC · JPL |
| 693638 | 2015 KD_{63} | — | May 11, 2015 | Mount Lemmon | Mount Lemmon Survey | · | 1.9 km | MPC · JPL |
| 693639 | 2015 KF_{63} | — | August 23, 2007 | Kitt Peak | Spacewatch | · | 1.3 km | MPC · JPL |
| 693640 | 2015 KH_{64} | — | March 28, 2015 | Haleakala | Pan-STARRS 1 | · | 1.7 km | MPC · JPL |
| 693641 | 2015 KU_{65} | — | December 22, 2008 | Mount Lemmon | Mount Lemmon Survey | · | 1.8 km | MPC · JPL |
| 693642 | 2015 KC_{66} | — | May 21, 2015 | Haleakala | Pan-STARRS 1 | · | 1.3 km | MPC · JPL |
| 693643 | 2015 KU_{66} | — | October 8, 2012 | Haleakala | Pan-STARRS 1 | · | 1.5 km | MPC · JPL |
| 693644 | 2015 KF_{67} | — | September 25, 2008 | Kitt Peak | Spacewatch | L4 | 6.6 km | MPC · JPL |
| 693645 | 2015 KE_{69} | — | February 28, 2014 | Haleakala | Pan-STARRS 1 | · | 1.4 km | MPC · JPL |
| 693646 | 2015 KH_{69} | — | May 21, 2015 | Haleakala | Pan-STARRS 1 | · | 1.4 km | MPC · JPL |
| 693647 | 2015 KH_{73} | — | September 12, 2007 | Mount Lemmon | Mount Lemmon Survey | · | 1.4 km | MPC · JPL |
| 693648 | 2015 KU_{74} | — | February 27, 2014 | Mount Lemmon | Mount Lemmon Survey | · | 1.7 km | MPC · JPL |
| 693649 | 2015 KH_{77} | — | July 28, 2011 | Haleakala | Pan-STARRS 1 | · | 1.4 km | MPC · JPL |
| 693650 | 2015 KN_{79} | — | May 21, 2015 | Haleakala | Pan-STARRS 1 | · | 1.5 km | MPC · JPL |
| 693651 | 2015 KH_{82} | — | March 28, 2015 | Haleakala | Pan-STARRS 1 | EOS | 1.4 km | MPC · JPL |
| 693652 | 2015 KF_{88} | — | May 21, 2015 | Haleakala | Pan-STARRS 1 | · | 2.2 km | MPC · JPL |
| 693653 | 2015 KO_{89} | — | July 26, 2011 | Haleakala | Pan-STARRS 1 | · | 1.3 km | MPC · JPL |
| 693654 | 2015 KL_{90} | — | May 21, 2015 | Haleakala | Pan-STARRS 1 | · | 1.4 km | MPC · JPL |
| 693655 | 2015 KD_{92} | — | April 23, 2015 | Haleakala | Pan-STARRS 1 | · | 1.5 km | MPC · JPL |
| 693656 | 2015 KQ_{93} | — | September 9, 2007 | Mount Lemmon | Mount Lemmon Survey | · | 1.5 km | MPC · JPL |
| 693657 | 2015 KG_{94} | — | May 22, 2006 | Kitt Peak | Spacewatch | · | 1.6 km | MPC · JPL |
| 693658 | 2015 KR_{94} | — | December 31, 2008 | Kitt Peak | Spacewatch | · | 1.8 km | MPC · JPL |
| 693659 | 2015 KV_{94} | — | November 24, 2008 | Mount Lemmon | Mount Lemmon Survey | · | 1.6 km | MPC · JPL |
| 693660 | 2015 KA_{98} | — | October 18, 2012 | Haleakala | Pan-STARRS 1 | · | 1.4 km | MPC · JPL |
| 693661 | 2015 KR_{98} | — | April 23, 2015 | Haleakala | Pan-STARRS 1 | · | 1.5 km | MPC · JPL |
| 693662 | 2015 KW_{98} | — | May 21, 2015 | Haleakala | Pan-STARRS 1 | · | 1.2 km | MPC · JPL |
| 693663 | 2015 KW_{99} | — | April 23, 2015 | Haleakala | Pan-STARRS 1 | · | 1.5 km | MPC · JPL |
| 693664 | 2015 KE_{100} | — | May 21, 2015 | Haleakala | Pan-STARRS 1 | · | 1.2 km | MPC · JPL |
| 693665 | 2015 KQ_{100} | — | April 22, 2009 | Mount Lemmon | Mount Lemmon Survey | · | 2.6 km | MPC · JPL |
| 693666 | 2015 KZ_{100} | — | May 21, 2015 | Haleakala | Pan-STARRS 1 | · | 1.6 km | MPC · JPL |
| 693667 | 2015 KE_{101} | — | September 13, 2007 | Mount Lemmon | Mount Lemmon Survey | · | 1.5 km | MPC · JPL |
| 693668 | 2015 KQ_{101} | — | May 21, 2015 | Haleakala | Pan-STARRS 1 | · | 1.6 km | MPC · JPL |
| 693669 | 2015 KB_{105} | — | April 23, 2015 | Haleakala | Pan-STARRS 1 | DOR | 1.9 km | MPC · JPL |
| 693670 | 2015 KN_{105} | — | September 10, 2007 | Kitt Peak | Spacewatch | · | 1.4 km | MPC · JPL |
| 693671 | 2015 KC_{107} | — | May 21, 2015 | Haleakala | Pan-STARRS 1 | MRX | 1.1 km | MPC · JPL |
| 693672 | 2015 KC_{109} | — | November 2, 2007 | Mount Lemmon | Mount Lemmon Survey | · | 1.5 km | MPC · JPL |
| 693673 | 2015 KK_{110} | — | May 21, 2015 | Haleakala | Pan-STARRS 1 | · | 1.6 km | MPC · JPL |
| 693674 | 2015 KZ_{114} | — | May 21, 2015 | Haleakala | Pan-STARRS 1 | · | 1.5 km | MPC · JPL |
| 693675 | 2015 KM_{119} | — | September 12, 2007 | Catalina | CSS | T_{j} (2.78) | 5.1 km | MPC · JPL |
| 693676 | 2015 KW_{119} | — | May 22, 2015 | Haleakala | Pan-STARRS 1 | · | 2.1 km | MPC · JPL |
| 693677 | 2015 KD_{122} | — | May 1, 2012 | Mount Lemmon | Mount Lemmon Survey | · | 890 m | MPC · JPL |
| 693678 | 2015 KN_{128} | — | December 14, 2013 | Mount Lemmon | Mount Lemmon Survey | · | 1.6 km | MPC · JPL |
| 693679 | 2015 KQ_{132} | — | May 22, 2015 | Haleakala | Pan-STARRS 1 | · | 1.1 km | MPC · JPL |
| 693680 | 2015 KR_{132} | — | November 8, 2009 | Mount Lemmon | Mount Lemmon Survey | · | 500 m | MPC · JPL |
| 693681 | 2015 KH_{133} | — | February 20, 2014 | Mount Lemmon | Mount Lemmon Survey | · | 1.7 km | MPC · JPL |
| 693682 | 2015 KL_{138} | — | November 27, 2013 | Haleakala | Pan-STARRS 1 | · | 640 m | MPC · JPL |
| 693683 | 2015 KY_{138} | — | May 24, 2015 | Haleakala | Pan-STARRS 1 | · | 960 m | MPC · JPL |
| 693684 | 2015 KM_{139} | — | May 24, 2015 | Haleakala | Pan-STARRS 1 | AGN | 1.0 km | MPC · JPL |
| 693685 | 2015 KG_{141} | — | May 24, 2015 | Haleakala | Pan-STARRS 1 | AGN | 910 m | MPC · JPL |
| 693686 | 2015 KN_{147} | — | August 27, 2011 | Haleakala | Pan-STARRS 1 | · | 1.8 km | MPC · JPL |
| 693687 | 2015 KH_{148} | — | September 24, 2011 | Haleakala | Pan-STARRS 1 | · | 1.5 km | MPC · JPL |
| 693688 | 2015 KY_{151} | — | May 25, 2015 | Haleakala | Pan-STARRS 1 | · | 1.4 km | MPC · JPL |
| 693689 | 2015 KR_{152} | — | May 25, 2015 | Haleakala | Pan-STARRS 1 | GAL | 1.6 km | MPC · JPL |
| 693690 | 2015 KV_{153} | — | May 25, 2015 | Haleakala | Pan-STARRS 1 | · | 1.7 km | MPC · JPL |
| 693691 | 2015 KJ_{157} | — | May 30, 2015 | Haleakala | Pan-STARRS 2 | ATE | 520 m | MPC · JPL |
| 693692 | 2015 KW_{159} | — | January 4, 2014 | Mount Lemmon | Mount Lemmon Survey | · | 2.4 km | MPC · JPL |
| 693693 | 2015 KP_{164} | — | May 18, 2015 | Haleakala | Pan-STARRS 1 | · | 1.5 km | MPC · JPL |
| 693694 | 2015 KT_{165} | — | August 28, 2011 | Haleakala | Pan-STARRS 1 | · | 1.1 km | MPC · JPL |
| 693695 | 2015 KW_{166} | — | May 21, 2015 | Haleakala | Pan-STARRS 1 | HOF | 1.8 km | MPC · JPL |
| 693696 | 2015 KV_{168} | — | May 18, 2015 | Haleakala | Pan-STARRS 1 | KOR | 1.1 km | MPC · JPL |
| 693697 | 2015 KL_{169} | — | August 27, 2011 | Haleakala | Pan-STARRS 1 | · | 1.5 km | MPC · JPL |
| 693698 | 2015 KN_{171} | — | May 25, 2015 | Haleakala | Pan-STARRS 1 | · | 1.4 km | MPC · JPL |
| 693699 | 2015 KZ_{172} | — | June 11, 2015 | Haleakala | Pan-STARRS 1 | · | 1.4 km | MPC · JPL |
| 693700 | 2015 KJ_{179} | — | May 21, 2015 | Haleakala | Pan-STARRS 1 | · | 1.6 km | MPC · JPL |

== 693701–693800 ==
back to top

| Designation | | | Discovery | | | Properties | | Ref |
| Permanent | Provisional | Named after | Date | Site | Discoverer(s) | Category | Diam. | Ref |
|---|---|---|---|---|---|---|---|---|
| 693701 | 2015 KX_{179} | — | May 21, 2015 | Haleakala | Pan-STARRS 1 | · | 2.2 km | MPC · JPL |
| 693702 | 2015 KZ_{181} | — | May 20, 2015 | Haleakala | Pan-STARRS 1 | · | 1.4 km | MPC · JPL |
| 693703 | 2015 KN_{186} | — | August 2, 2016 | Haleakala | Pan-STARRS 1 | · | 1.6 km | MPC · JPL |
| 693704 | 2015 KM_{187} | — | October 21, 2012 | Haleakala | Pan-STARRS 1 | HOF | 2.3 km | MPC · JPL |
| 693705 | 2015 KN_{187} | — | May 22, 2015 | Haleakala | Pan-STARRS 1 | · | 1.3 km | MPC · JPL |
| 693706 | 2015 KR_{187} | — | May 21, 2015 | Haleakala | Pan-STARRS 1 | MRX | 990 m | MPC · JPL |
| 693707 | 2015 KR_{190} | — | May 20, 2015 | Haleakala | Pan-STARRS 1 | AGN | 830 m | MPC · JPL |
| 693708 | 2015 KV_{192} | — | May 20, 2015 | Mount Lemmon | Mount Lemmon Survey | PAD | 1.1 km | MPC · JPL |
| 693709 | 2015 KK_{194} | — | November 7, 2008 | Mount Lemmon | Mount Lemmon Survey | · | 1.5 km | MPC · JPL |
| 693710 | 2015 KD_{196} | — | May 18, 2015 | Haleakala | Pan-STARRS 1 | · | 1.0 km | MPC · JPL |
| 693711 | 2015 KB_{200} | — | January 25, 2014 | Haleakala | Pan-STARRS 1 | AGN | 900 m | MPC · JPL |
| 693712 | 2015 KD_{200} | — | December 3, 2012 | Mount Lemmon | Mount Lemmon Survey | HOF | 2.2 km | MPC · JPL |
| 693713 | 2015 KE_{202} | — | May 22, 2015 | Haleakala | Pan-STARRS 1 | GEF | 810 m | MPC · JPL |
| 693714 | 2015 KH_{202} | — | May 21, 2015 | Haleakala | Pan-STARRS 1 | · | 1.6 km | MPC · JPL |
| 693715 | 2015 KS_{203} | — | May 25, 2015 | Mount Lemmon | Mount Lemmon Survey | · | 1.5 km | MPC · JPL |
| 693716 | 2015 KN_{206} | — | May 26, 2015 | Haleakala | Pan-STARRS 1 | · | 1.5 km | MPC · JPL |
| 693717 | 2015 KO_{206} | — | May 21, 2015 | Haleakala | Pan-STARRS 1 | · | 1.1 km | MPC · JPL |
| 693718 | 2015 KV_{206} | — | May 25, 2015 | Haleakala | Pan-STARRS 1 | AGN | 960 m | MPC · JPL |
| 693719 | 2015 KY_{206} | — | May 21, 2015 | Haleakala | Pan-STARRS 1 | · | 1.5 km | MPC · JPL |
| 693720 | 2015 KZ_{206} | — | May 22, 2015 | Haleakala | Pan-STARRS 1 | · | 1.8 km | MPC · JPL |
| 693721 | 2015 KX_{207} | — | May 25, 2015 | Mount Lemmon | Mount Lemmon Survey | · | 1.7 km | MPC · JPL |
| 693722 | 2015 KC_{210} | — | May 18, 2015 | Haleakala | Pan-STARRS 1 | · | 1.3 km | MPC · JPL |
| 693723 | 2015 KL_{212} | — | January 2, 2009 | Mount Lemmon | Mount Lemmon Survey | · | 1.4 km | MPC · JPL |
| 693724 | 2015 KT_{213} | — | May 21, 2015 | Cerro Tololo | DECam | · | 470 m | MPC · JPL |
| 693725 | 2015 KS_{214} | — | May 25, 2015 | Haleakala | Pan-STARRS 1 | · | 1.4 km | MPC · JPL |
| 693726 | 2015 KM_{227} | — | January 24, 2014 | Haleakala | Pan-STARRS 1 | AGN | 790 m | MPC · JPL |
| 693727 | 2015 KO_{227} | — | June 18, 2015 | Haleakala | Pan-STARRS 1 | · | 1.4 km | MPC · JPL |
| 693728 | 2015 KW_{234} | — | May 20, 2015 | Cerro Tololo | DECam | · | 1.6 km | MPC · JPL |
| 693729 | 2015 KF_{239} | — | May 19, 2015 | Mount Lemmon | Mount Lemmon Survey | KOR | 880 m | MPC · JPL |
| 693730 | 2015 KE_{243} | — | May 24, 2015 | Haleakala | Pan-STARRS 1 | · | 1.1 km | MPC · JPL |
| 693731 | 2015 KS_{273} | — | May 20, 2015 | Cerro Tololo | DECam | KOR | 870 m | MPC · JPL |
| 693732 | 2015 KN_{312} | — | November 28, 2013 | Mount Lemmon | Mount Lemmon Survey | · | 1.3 km | MPC · JPL |
| 693733 | 2015 KB_{319} | — | May 21, 2015 | Haleakala | Pan-STARRS 1 | HOF | 2.1 km | MPC · JPL |
| 693734 | 2015 KH_{331} | — | May 21, 2015 | Cerro Tololo | DECam | KOR | 990 m | MPC · JPL |
| 693735 | 2015 KY_{332} | — | May 20, 2015 | Cerro Tololo | DECam | · | 1.2 km | MPC · JPL |
| 693736 | 2015 KR_{383} | — | May 20, 2015 | Cerro Tololo | DECam | · | 1.3 km | MPC · JPL |
| 693737 | 2015 LT_{17} | — | February 10, 2014 | Haleakala | Pan-STARRS 1 | · | 1.7 km | MPC · JPL |
| 693738 | 2015 LY_{17} | — | November 9, 2013 | Mount Lemmon | Mount Lemmon Survey | · | 1.1 km | MPC · JPL |
| 693739 | 2015 LW_{19} | — | August 4, 2011 | Haleakala | Pan-STARRS 1 | · | 1.4 km | MPC · JPL |
| 693740 | 2015 LQ_{22} | — | December 30, 2005 | Kitt Peak | Spacewatch | · | 1.3 km | MPC · JPL |
| 693741 | 2015 LY_{22} | — | May 21, 2015 | Haleakala | Pan-STARRS 1 | · | 1.0 km | MPC · JPL |
| 693742 | 2015 LB_{25} | — | October 20, 2007 | Mount Lemmon | Mount Lemmon Survey | · | 1.7 km | MPC · JPL |
| 693743 | 2015 LW_{26} | — | February 1, 2009 | Kitt Peak | Spacewatch | · | 1.9 km | MPC · JPL |
| 693744 | 2015 LA_{34} | — | June 13, 2015 | Haleakala | Pan-STARRS 1 | · | 2.4 km | MPC · JPL |
| 693745 | 2015 LG_{34} | — | October 9, 2007 | Kitt Peak | Spacewatch | · | 1.6 km | MPC · JPL |
| 693746 | 2015 LV_{50} | — | June 15, 2015 | Haleakala | Pan-STARRS 1 | EOS | 1.3 km | MPC · JPL |
| 693747 | 2015 LM_{51} | — | June 7, 2015 | Haleakala | Pan-STARRS 1 | · | 1.8 km | MPC · JPL |
| 693748 | 2015 LW_{52} | — | June 15, 2015 | Haleakala | Pan-STARRS 1 | 615 | 1.0 km | MPC · JPL |
| 693749 | 2015 LD_{53} | — | June 11, 2015 | Haleakala | Pan-STARRS 1 | AGN | 810 m | MPC · JPL |
| 693750 | 2015 LW_{54} | — | June 11, 2015 | Haleakala | Pan-STARRS 1 | VER | 1.9 km | MPC · JPL |
| 693751 | 2015 LR_{57} | — | June 11, 2015 | Haleakala | Pan-STARRS 1 | · | 1.6 km | MPC · JPL |
| 693752 | 2015 LX_{57} | — | June 11, 2015 | Haleakala | Pan-STARRS 1 | · | 1.5 km | MPC · JPL |
| 693753 | 2015 LY_{57} | — | June 13, 2015 | Haleakala | Pan-STARRS 1 | KOR | 1.1 km | MPC · JPL |
| 693754 | 2015 LL_{58} | — | June 15, 2015 | Haleakala | Pan-STARRS 1 | · | 1.3 km | MPC · JPL |
| 693755 | 2015 LD_{62} | — | June 13, 2015 | Haleakala | Pan-STARRS 1 | EOS | 1.3 km | MPC · JPL |
| 693756 | 2015 LH_{62} | — | June 11, 2015 | Haleakala | Pan-STARRS 1 | · | 1.3 km | MPC · JPL |
| 693757 | 2015 MH | — | May 22, 2006 | Kitt Peak | Spacewatch | · | 1.7 km | MPC · JPL |
| 693758 | 2015 MT_{2} | — | November 1, 2011 | Mount Lemmon | Mount Lemmon Survey | · | 1.8 km | MPC · JPL |
| 693759 | 2015 MG_{3} | — | June 16, 2015 | Haleakala | Pan-STARRS 1 | · | 1.9 km | MPC · JPL |
| 693760 | 2015 MT_{4} | — | June 16, 2015 | Haleakala | Pan-STARRS 1 | · | 1.7 km | MPC · JPL |
| 693761 | 2015 MH_{9} | — | June 16, 2015 | Haleakala | Pan-STARRS 1 | · | 1.6 km | MPC · JPL |
| 693762 | 2015 MP_{16} | — | October 10, 2012 | Haleakala | Pan-STARRS 1 | · | 1.9 km | MPC · JPL |
| 693763 | 2015 MD_{17} | — | March 13, 2007 | Rehoboth | L. A. Molnar | · | 1.1 km | MPC · JPL |
| 693764 | 2015 MF_{17} | — | December 24, 2013 | Mount Lemmon | Mount Lemmon Survey | · | 1.2 km | MPC · JPL |
| 693765 | 2015 MV_{17} | — | April 11, 2015 | Mount Lemmon | Mount Lemmon Survey | · | 1.1 km | MPC · JPL |
| 693766 | 2015 MH_{19} | — | December 31, 2013 | Haleakala | Pan-STARRS 1 | · | 1.8 km | MPC · JPL |
| 693767 | 2015 MZ_{21} | — | November 19, 2007 | Mount Lemmon | Mount Lemmon Survey | BRA | 1.3 km | MPC · JPL |
| 693768 | 2015 MO_{25} | — | October 16, 2012 | Kitt Peak | Spacewatch | · | 1.3 km | MPC · JPL |
| 693769 | 2015 MY_{27} | — | February 17, 2010 | Kitt Peak | Spacewatch | · | 1.4 km | MPC · JPL |
| 693770 | 2015 ML_{30} | — | January 24, 1996 | Kitt Peak | Spacewatch | · | 2.2 km | MPC · JPL |
| 693771 | 2015 ML_{31} | — | May 21, 2015 | Haleakala | Pan-STARRS 1 | · | 1.4 km | MPC · JPL |
| 693772 | 2015 MM_{31} | — | December 3, 2012 | Mount Lemmon | Mount Lemmon Survey | TIN | 1.0 km | MPC · JPL |
| 693773 | 2015 MQ_{31} | — | May 21, 2015 | Haleakala | Pan-STARRS 1 | · | 1.6 km | MPC · JPL |
| 693774 | 2015 ML_{32} | — | April 25, 2015 | Haleakala | Pan-STARRS 1 | · | 1.3 km | MPC · JPL |
| 693775 | 2015 MJ_{34} | — | September 28, 2008 | Catalina | CSS | · | 1.2 km | MPC · JPL |
| 693776 | 2015 MQ_{38} | — | October 23, 2003 | Apache Point | SDSS Collaboration | · | 1.4 km | MPC · JPL |
| 693777 | 2015 MV_{38} | — | March 28, 2015 | Haleakala | Pan-STARRS 1 | · | 2.1 km | MPC · JPL |
| 693778 | 2015 MY_{39} | — | February 17, 2010 | Kitt Peak | Spacewatch | EUN | 1.0 km | MPC · JPL |
| 693779 | 2015 MY_{41} | — | April 23, 2015 | Haleakala | Pan-STARRS 1 | · | 1.5 km | MPC · JPL |
| 693780 | 2015 MS_{44} | — | June 17, 2015 | Haleakala | Pan-STARRS 1 | · | 1.9 km | MPC · JPL |
| 693781 | 2015 MO_{45} | — | June 17, 2015 | Haleakala | Pan-STARRS 1 | · | 1.5 km | MPC · JPL |
| 693782 | 2015 MK_{48} | — | June 17, 2015 | Haleakala | Pan-STARRS 1 | · | 1.9 km | MPC · JPL |
| 693783 | 2015 MU_{48} | — | December 4, 2007 | Kitt Peak | Spacewatch | · | 1.9 km | MPC · JPL |
| 693784 | 2015 MK_{51} | — | May 4, 2005 | Kitt Peak | Spacewatch | · | 2.1 km | MPC · JPL |
| 693785 | 2015 MV_{54} | — | May 26, 2015 | Haleakala | Pan-STARRS 1 | · | 1.7 km | MPC · JPL |
| 693786 | 2015 MA_{56} | — | August 27, 2011 | Haleakala | Pan-STARRS 1 | TIN | 870 m | MPC · JPL |
| 693787 | 2015 MC_{56} | — | January 28, 2007 | Kitt Peak | Spacewatch | · | 780 m | MPC · JPL |
| 693788 | 2015 MP_{57} | — | June 15, 2015 | Haleakala | Pan-STARRS 1 | · | 2.0 km | MPC · JPL |
| 693789 | 2015 ML_{58} | — | May 31, 2006 | Kitt Peak | Spacewatch | · | 1.2 km | MPC · JPL |
| 693790 | 2015 ML_{60} | — | September 7, 2008 | Mount Lemmon | Mount Lemmon Survey | · | 1.3 km | MPC · JPL |
| 693791 | 2015 MB_{61} | — | February 26, 2014 | Haleakala | Pan-STARRS 1 | KOR | 1.2 km | MPC · JPL |
| 693792 | 2015 MW_{69} | — | September 20, 2011 | Haleakala | Pan-STARRS 1 | · | 1.2 km | MPC · JPL |
| 693793 | 2015 MS_{77} | — | June 18, 2015 | Haleakala | Pan-STARRS 1 | · | 2.1 km | MPC · JPL |
| 693794 | 2015 ML_{78} | — | June 16, 2015 | Haleakala | Pan-STARRS 1 | · | 1.8 km | MPC · JPL |
| 693795 | 2015 MT_{78} | — | October 18, 2007 | Kitt Peak | Spacewatch | · | 1.6 km | MPC · JPL |
| 693796 | 2015 MN_{87} | — | January 16, 2013 | Mount Lemmon | Mount Lemmon Survey | · | 2.0 km | MPC · JPL |
| 693797 | 2015 MS_{90} | — | October 20, 2005 | Mount Lemmon | Mount Lemmon Survey | · | 1.8 km | MPC · JPL |
| 693798 | 2015 MC_{92} | — | June 15, 2015 | Haleakala | Pan-STARRS 1 | · | 1.6 km | MPC · JPL |
| 693799 | 2015 MB_{94} | — | June 23, 2015 | Haleakala | Pan-STARRS 1 | · | 1.9 km | MPC · JPL |
| 693800 | 2015 MN_{104} | — | September 14, 2007 | Mount Lemmon | Mount Lemmon Survey | · | 1.3 km | MPC · JPL |

== 693801–693900 ==
back to top

| Designation | | | Discovery | | | Properties | | Ref |
| Permanent | Provisional | Named after | Date | Site | Discoverer(s) | Category | Diam. | Ref |
|---|---|---|---|---|---|---|---|---|
| 693801 | 2015 MX_{104} | — | December 23, 2012 | Haleakala | Pan-STARRS 1 | EOS | 1.4 km | MPC · JPL |
| 693802 | 2015 MR_{105} | — | June 26, 2015 | Haleakala | Pan-STARRS 1 | KOR | 1.0 km | MPC · JPL |
| 693803 | 2015 MM_{106} | — | September 17, 2003 | Kitt Peak | Spacewatch | · | 1.1 km | MPC · JPL |
| 693804 | 2015 MJ_{107} | — | October 26, 2011 | Haleakala | Pan-STARRS 1 | · | 1.4 km | MPC · JPL |
| 693805 | 2015 MJ_{110} | — | June 26, 2015 | Haleakala | Pan-STARRS 1 | · | 1.7 km | MPC · JPL |
| 693806 | 2015 MA_{111} | — | June 13, 2015 | Haleakala | Pan-STARRS 1 | · | 2.3 km | MPC · JPL |
| 693807 | 2015 MP_{111} | — | June 26, 2015 | Haleakala | Pan-STARRS 1 | · | 1.4 km | MPC · JPL |
| 693808 | 2015 MX_{113} | — | June 15, 2015 | Mount Lemmon | Mount Lemmon Survey | · | 2.4 km | MPC · JPL |
| 693809 | 2015 MC_{117} | — | October 22, 2011 | Mount Lemmon | Mount Lemmon Survey | KOR | 1.0 km | MPC · JPL |
| 693810 | 2015 MV_{119} | — | July 25, 2001 | Haleakala | NEAT | · | 2.3 km | MPC · JPL |
| 693811 | 2015 MN_{120} | — | August 29, 2006 | Catalina | CSS | · | 2.2 km | MPC · JPL |
| 693812 | 2015 MD_{123} | — | November 4, 2007 | Kitt Peak | Spacewatch | · | 1.5 km | MPC · JPL |
| 693813 | 2015 MN_{123} | — | August 31, 2005 | Kitt Peak | Spacewatch | V | 510 m | MPC · JPL |
| 693814 | 2015 MN_{125} | — | May 12, 2010 | Mount Lemmon | Mount Lemmon Survey | TIN | 790 m | MPC · JPL |
| 693815 | 2015 MM_{134} | — | June 17, 2015 | Haleakala | Pan-STARRS 1 | · | 1.8 km | MPC · JPL |
| 693816 | 2015 MT_{135} | — | May 5, 2008 | Mount Lemmon | Mount Lemmon Survey | · | 480 m | MPC · JPL |
| 693817 | 2015 MX_{135} | — | June 27, 2015 | Haleakala | Pan-STARRS 1 | · | 2.2 km | MPC · JPL |
| 693818 | 2015 MC_{136} | — | September 14, 2007 | Mount Lemmon | Mount Lemmon Survey | · | 990 m | MPC · JPL |
| 693819 | 2015 ML_{136} | — | November 12, 2012 | Mount Lemmon | Mount Lemmon Survey | · | 920 m | MPC · JPL |
| 693820 | 2015 MY_{136} | — | January 20, 2013 | Kitt Peak | Spacewatch | · | 2.0 km | MPC · JPL |
| 693821 | 2015 MC_{137} | — | April 14, 2008 | Mount Lemmon | Mount Lemmon Survey | EOS | 1.6 km | MPC · JPL |
| 693822 | 2015 MM_{138} | — | October 19, 2003 | Kitt Peak | Spacewatch | · | 1.3 km | MPC · JPL |
| 693823 | 2015 ML_{139} | — | June 16, 2015 | Haleakala | Pan-STARRS 1 | · | 1.5 km | MPC · JPL |
| 693824 | 2015 MW_{141} | — | June 19, 2015 | Haleakala | Pan-STARRS 1 | · | 2.1 km | MPC · JPL |
| 693825 | 2015 MC_{142} | — | June 20, 2015 | Haleakala | Pan-STARRS 1 | · | 2.4 km | MPC · JPL |
| 693826 | 2015 MX_{144} | — | June 25, 2015 | Haleakala | Pan-STARRS 1 | · | 2.8 km | MPC · JPL |
| 693827 | 2015 MW_{145} | — | September 2, 2011 | Haleakala | Pan-STARRS 1 | · | 1.3 km | MPC · JPL |
| 693828 | 2015 MO_{147} | — | October 1, 2005 | Mount Lemmon | Mount Lemmon Survey | EOS | 1.4 km | MPC · JPL |
| 693829 | 2015 MT_{148} | — | June 27, 2015 | Haleakala | Pan-STARRS 1 | · | 1.9 km | MPC · JPL |
| 693830 | 2015 ME_{149} | — | June 28, 2015 | Haleakala | Pan-STARRS 1 | EOS | 1.5 km | MPC · JPL |
| 693831 | 2015 MF_{152} | — | June 17, 2015 | Haleakala | Pan-STARRS 1 | PHO | 840 m | MPC · JPL |
| 693832 | 2015 MV_{158} | — | June 26, 2015 | Haleakala | Pan-STARRS 1 | · | 1.3 km | MPC · JPL |
| 693833 | 2015 MU_{159} | — | October 4, 2016 | Mount Lemmon | Mount Lemmon Survey | · | 1.6 km | MPC · JPL |
| 693834 | 2015 MJ_{162} | — | June 26, 2015 | Haleakala | Pan-STARRS 1 | · | 2.0 km | MPC · JPL |
| 693835 | 2015 MX_{162} | — | June 26, 2015 | Haleakala | Pan-STARRS 1 | · | 1.3 km | MPC · JPL |
| 693836 | 2015 MC_{163} | — | June 18, 2015 | Haleakala | Pan-STARRS 1 | · | 1.5 km | MPC · JPL |
| 693837 | 2015 MP_{165} | — | October 31, 2010 | Mount Lemmon | Mount Lemmon Survey | · | 2.7 km | MPC · JPL |
| 693838 | 2015 MX_{166} | — | April 9, 2014 | Haleakala | Pan-STARRS 1 | · | 1.7 km | MPC · JPL |
| 693839 | 2015 MM_{167} | — | June 27, 2015 | Haleakala | Pan-STARRS 1 | EOS | 1.2 km | MPC · JPL |
| 693840 | 2015 MT_{167} | — | June 27, 2015 | Haleakala | Pan-STARRS 1 | · | 1.2 km | MPC · JPL |
| 693841 | 2015 MA_{168} | — | June 26, 2015 | Haleakala | Pan-STARRS 1 | · | 1.3 km | MPC · JPL |
| 693842 | 2015 MS_{170} | — | June 20, 2015 | Haleakala | Pan-STARRS 1 | · | 1.4 km | MPC · JPL |
| 693843 | 2015 MU_{170} | — | June 28, 2015 | Haleakala | Pan-STARRS 1 | BRA | 960 m | MPC · JPL |
| 693844 | 2015 MW_{171} | — | June 16, 2015 | Haleakala | Pan-STARRS 1 | · | 1.8 km | MPC · JPL |
| 693845 | 2015 MZ_{171} | — | June 26, 2015 | Haleakala | Pan-STARRS 1 | · | 1.4 km | MPC · JPL |
| 693846 | 2015 MG_{176} | — | June 26, 2015 | Haleakala | Pan-STARRS 1 | KOR | 920 m | MPC · JPL |
| 693847 | 2015 MW_{182} | — | June 27, 2015 | Haleakala | Pan-STARRS 1 | · | 2.0 km | MPC · JPL |
| 693848 | 2015 MF_{183} | — | June 29, 2015 | Haleakala | Pan-STARRS 1 | · | 1.7 km | MPC · JPL |
| 693849 | 2015 MA_{186} | — | October 31, 2010 | Kitt Peak | Spacewatch | · | 3.2 km | MPC · JPL |
| 693850 | 2015 MK_{187} | — | June 27, 2015 | Haleakala | Pan-STARRS 1 | · | 1.7 km | MPC · JPL |
| 693851 | 2015 MN_{188} | — | January 16, 2009 | Mount Lemmon | Mount Lemmon Survey | · | 1.4 km | MPC · JPL |
| 693852 | 2015 ML_{189} | — | June 26, 2015 | Haleakala | Pan-STARRS 1 | · | 2.1 km | MPC · JPL |
| 693853 | 2015 MR_{190} | — | June 26, 2015 | Haleakala | Pan-STARRS 1 | · | 1.5 km | MPC · JPL |
| 693854 | 2015 MB_{191} | — | June 27, 2015 | Haleakala | Pan-STARRS 1 | · | 1.4 km | MPC · JPL |
| 693855 | 2015 MP_{193} | — | June 17, 2015 | Haleakala | Pan-STARRS 1 | · | 1.8 km | MPC · JPL |
| 693856 | 2015 MF_{195} | — | February 9, 2013 | Haleakala | Pan-STARRS 1 | · | 2.1 km | MPC · JPL |
| 693857 | 2015 MZ_{196} | — | June 17, 2015 | Haleakala | Pan-STARRS 1 | · | 2.1 km | MPC · JPL |
| 693858 | 2015 MM_{198} | — | June 26, 2015 | Haleakala | Pan-STARRS 1 | KOR | 890 m | MPC · JPL |
| 693859 | 2015 MO_{201} | — | June 26, 2015 | Haleakala | Pan-STARRS 1 | · | 500 m | MPC · JPL |
| 693860 | 2015 MO_{203} | — | June 26, 2015 | Haleakala | Pan-STARRS 1 | EOS | 1.2 km | MPC · JPL |
| 693861 | 2015 MQ_{204} | — | June 22, 2009 | Haleakala | Pan-STARRS 1 | SDO | 301 km | MPC · JPL |
| 693862 | 2015 NM_{18} | — | September 21, 2001 | Apache Point | SDSS Collaboration | · | 1.4 km | MPC · JPL |
| 693863 | 2015 NS_{18} | — | September 16, 2010 | Kitt Peak | Spacewatch | · | 2.4 km | MPC · JPL |
| 693864 | 2015 NZ_{19} | — | August 30, 2011 | Haleakala | Pan-STARRS 1 | · | 2.1 km | MPC · JPL |
| 693865 | 2015 NH_{26} | — | February 26, 2004 | Kitt Peak | Deep Ecliptic Survey | · | 1.6 km | MPC · JPL |
| 693866 | 2015 NM_{32} | — | July 12, 2015 | Haleakala | Pan-STARRS 1 | · | 1.5 km | MPC · JPL |
| 693867 | 2015 NS_{32} | — | July 12, 2015 | Haleakala | Pan-STARRS 1 | · | 1.6 km | MPC · JPL |
| 693868 | 2015 NN_{33} | — | July 12, 2015 | Haleakala | Pan-STARRS 1 | · | 1.5 km | MPC · JPL |
| 693869 | 2015 NG_{35} | — | July 11, 2015 | Haleakala | Pan-STARRS 1 | EOS | 1.5 km | MPC · JPL |
| 693870 | 2015 NU_{35} | — | July 12, 2015 | Haleakala | Pan-STARRS 1 | · | 1.6 km | MPC · JPL |
| 693871 | 2015 NO_{38} | — | July 14, 2015 | Haleakala | Pan-STARRS 1 | · | 1.9 km | MPC · JPL |
| 693872 | 2015 NY_{38} | — | July 12, 2015 | Haleakala | Pan-STARRS 1 | · | 2.3 km | MPC · JPL |
| 693873 | 2015 NH_{39} | — | July 9, 2015 | Haleakala | Pan-STARRS 1 | · | 1.7 km | MPC · JPL |
| 693874 | 2015 OF_{4} | — | June 27, 2015 | Haleakala | Pan-STARRS 1 | · | 1.5 km | MPC · JPL |
| 693875 | 2015 OG_{8} | — | November 6, 2012 | Kitt Peak | Spacewatch | · | 1.8 km | MPC · JPL |
| 693876 | 2015 OV_{10} | — | March 11, 2005 | Kitt Peak | Deep Ecliptic Survey | · | 1.2 km | MPC · JPL |
| 693877 | 2015 OR_{14} | — | July 18, 2015 | Haleakala | Pan-STARRS 1 | · | 1.4 km | MPC · JPL |
| 693878 | 2015 OT_{14} | — | July 18, 2015 | Haleakala | Pan-STARRS 1 | · | 1.5 km | MPC · JPL |
| 693879 | 2015 OG_{27} | — | July 9, 2015 | Haleakala | Pan-STARRS 1 | EUN | 1.1 km | MPC · JPL |
| 693880 | 2015 OP_{28} | — | July 28, 2005 | Palomar | NEAT | · | 630 m | MPC · JPL |
| 693881 | 2015 OA_{35} | — | September 21, 2011 | Mount Lemmon | Mount Lemmon Survey | EUN | 1.2 km | MPC · JPL |
| 693882 | 2015 OS_{37} | — | September 30, 2003 | Kitt Peak | Spacewatch | · | 1.1 km | MPC · JPL |
| 693883 | 2015 ON_{39} | — | November 11, 2001 | Apache Point | SDSS Collaboration | · | 890 m | MPC · JPL |
| 693884 | 2015 OC_{41} | — | November 8, 2007 | Mount Lemmon | Mount Lemmon Survey | · | 1.3 km | MPC · JPL |
| 693885 | 2015 OX_{41} | — | July 23, 2015 | Haleakala | Pan-STARRS 1 | · | 2.2 km | MPC · JPL |
| 693886 | 2015 OU_{44} | — | July 25, 2003 | Palomar | NEAT | · | 1.1 km | MPC · JPL |
| 693887 | 2015 OF_{48} | — | April 4, 2014 | Mount Lemmon | Mount Lemmon Survey | · | 1.4 km | MPC · JPL |
| 693888 | 2015 OG_{49} | — | May 7, 2014 | Haleakala | Pan-STARRS 1 | · | 1.9 km | MPC · JPL |
| 693889 | 2015 OZ_{49} | — | July 26, 2015 | Haleakala | Pan-STARRS 1 | · | 1.5 km | MPC · JPL |
| 693890 | 2015 OT_{51} | — | July 26, 2015 | Haleakala | Pan-STARRS 1 | · | 1.7 km | MPC · JPL |
| 693891 | 2015 OH_{52} | — | July 26, 2015 | Haleakala | Pan-STARRS 1 | · | 1.9 km | MPC · JPL |
| 693892 | 2015 OO_{53} | — | July 26, 2015 | Haleakala | Pan-STARRS 1 | EOS | 1.4 km | MPC · JPL |
| 693893 | 2015 OZ_{53} | — | July 26, 2015 | Haleakala | Pan-STARRS 1 | · | 1.7 km | MPC · JPL |
| 693894 | 2015 OA_{58} | — | May 9, 2014 | Haleakala | Pan-STARRS 1 | EOS | 1.1 km | MPC · JPL |
| 693895 | 2015 OR_{60} | — | July 26, 2015 | Haleakala | Pan-STARRS 1 | · | 1.6 km | MPC · JPL |
| 693896 | 2015 OC_{61} | — | December 31, 2011 | Mount Lemmon | Mount Lemmon Survey | · | 1.5 km | MPC · JPL |
| 693897 | 2015 OJ_{64} | — | May 7, 2014 | Haleakala | Pan-STARRS 1 | · | 1.6 km | MPC · JPL |
| 693898 | 2015 OK_{64} | — | April 30, 2014 | Haleakala | Pan-STARRS 1 | · | 1.8 km | MPC · JPL |
| 693899 | 2015 OK_{65} | — | July 25, 2015 | Haleakala | Pan-STARRS 1 | · | 500 m | MPC · JPL |
| 693900 | 2015 OR_{65} | — | October 12, 2009 | Mount Lemmon | Mount Lemmon Survey | · | 560 m | MPC · JPL |

== 693901–694000 ==
back to top

| Designation | | | Discovery | | | Properties | | Ref |
| Permanent | Provisional | Named after | Date | Site | Discoverer(s) | Category | Diam. | Ref |
|---|---|---|---|---|---|---|---|---|
| 693901 | 2015 OT_{67} | — | January 8, 2010 | Kitt Peak | Spacewatch | · | 1.0 km | MPC · JPL |
| 693902 | 2015 OO_{72} | — | October 24, 2011 | Haleakala | Pan-STARRS 1 | · | 1.6 km | MPC · JPL |
| 693903 | 2015 OZ_{72} | — | July 27, 2015 | Haleakala | Pan-STARRS 1 | · | 1.4 km | MPC · JPL |
| 693904 | 2015 OZ_{73} | — | November 30, 2010 | Mount Lemmon | Mount Lemmon Survey | · | 2.5 km | MPC · JPL |
| 693905 | 2015 OH_{76} | — | August 20, 2006 | Palomar | NEAT | · | 1.5 km | MPC · JPL |
| 693906 | 2015 OT_{76} | — | October 17, 2012 | Mount Lemmon | Mount Lemmon Survey | · | 510 m | MPC · JPL |
| 693907 | 2015 OS_{77} | — | July 9, 2010 | · | WISE | · | 1.6 km | MPC · JPL |
| 693908 | 2015 OX_{81} | — | July 19, 2015 | Haleakala | Pan-STARRS 1 | EOS | 1.4 km | MPC · JPL |
| 693909 | 2015 OV_{83} | — | July 6, 2005 | Kitt Peak | Spacewatch | · | 1.4 km | MPC · JPL |
| 693910 | 2015 OW_{85} | — | July 25, 2015 | Haleakala | Pan-STARRS 1 | · | 2.6 km | MPC · JPL |
| 693911 | 2015 OK_{87} | — | February 13, 2005 | La Silla | A. Boattini | · | 1.7 km | MPC · JPL |
| 693912 | 2015 OO_{87} | — | July 25, 2015 | Haleakala | Pan-STARRS 1 | · | 2.9 km | MPC · JPL |
| 693913 | 2015 OF_{88} | — | July 23, 2015 | Haleakala | Pan-STARRS 1 | · | 1.7 km | MPC · JPL |
| 693914 | 2015 OQ_{88} | — | July 27, 2015 | Haleakala | Pan-STARRS 1 | · | 1.9 km | MPC · JPL |
| 693915 | 2015 OR_{89} | — | May 2, 2014 | Mount Lemmon | Mount Lemmon Survey | · | 1.3 km | MPC · JPL |
| 693916 | 2015 OC_{90} | — | February 28, 2014 | Haleakala | Pan-STARRS 1 | · | 1.4 km | MPC · JPL |
| 693917 | 2015 OG_{90} | — | July 23, 2015 | Haleakala | Pan-STARRS 1 | KOR | 1.2 km | MPC · JPL |
| 693918 | 2015 OO_{90} | — | July 28, 2015 | Haleakala | Pan-STARRS 1 | KOR | 1.2 km | MPC · JPL |
| 693919 | 2015 OU_{92} | — | October 20, 2012 | Mount Lemmon | Mount Lemmon Survey | · | 570 m | MPC · JPL |
| 693920 | 2015 ON_{94} | — | May 23, 2014 | Haleakala | Pan-STARRS 1 | · | 2.4 km | MPC · JPL |
| 693921 | 2015 OK_{96} | — | July 23, 2015 | Haleakala | Pan-STARRS 1 | · | 1.8 km | MPC · JPL |
| 693922 | 2015 OP_{96} | — | July 23, 2015 | Haleakala | Pan-STARRS 1 | · | 2.4 km | MPC · JPL |
| 693923 | 2015 OY_{97} | — | September 10, 2010 | Kitt Peak | Spacewatch | · | 2.1 km | MPC · JPL |
| 693924 | 2015 OS_{99} | — | September 18, 2010 | Mount Lemmon | Mount Lemmon Survey | EOS | 1.3 km | MPC · JPL |
| 693925 | 2015 OE_{101} | — | May 6, 2014 | Haleakala | Pan-STARRS 1 | · | 1.8 km | MPC · JPL |
| 693926 | 2015 OJ_{101} | — | October 11, 2012 | Haleakala | Pan-STARRS 1 | · | 570 m | MPC · JPL |
| 693927 | 2015 OS_{101} | — | May 8, 2014 | Haleakala | Pan-STARRS 1 | · | 1.6 km | MPC · JPL |
| 693928 | 2015 OL_{103} | — | April 5, 2014 | Haleakala | Pan-STARRS 1 | · | 1.5 km | MPC · JPL |
| 693929 | 2015 OR_{105} | — | July 23, 2015 | Haleakala | Pan-STARRS 1 | EUP | 2.9 km | MPC · JPL |
| 693930 | 2015 OZ_{105} | — | July 24, 2015 | Haleakala | Pan-STARRS 1 | EOS | 1.5 km | MPC · JPL |
| 693931 | 2015 OV_{118} | — | November 18, 2016 | Mount Lemmon | Mount Lemmon Survey | EOS | 1.9 km | MPC · JPL |
| 693932 | 2015 OD_{120} | — | May 8, 2014 | Haleakala | Pan-STARRS 1 | EOS | 1.4 km | MPC · JPL |
| 693933 | 2015 OG_{123} | — | July 19, 2015 | Haleakala | Pan-STARRS 1 | · | 2.0 km | MPC · JPL |
| 693934 | 2015 OC_{124} | — | July 24, 2015 | Haleakala | Pan-STARRS 1 | EOS | 1.2 km | MPC · JPL |
| 693935 | 2015 OU_{124} | — | July 25, 2015 | Haleakala | Pan-STARRS 1 | · | 2.0 km | MPC · JPL |
| 693936 | 2015 OV_{126} | — | July 25, 2015 | Haleakala | Pan-STARRS 1 | · | 1.9 km | MPC · JPL |
| 693937 | 2015 OZ_{126} | — | July 25, 2015 | Haleakala | Pan-STARRS 1 | KOR | 1.1 km | MPC · JPL |
| 693938 | 2015 OR_{127} | — | July 25, 2015 | Haleakala | Pan-STARRS 1 | EOS | 1.7 km | MPC · JPL |
| 693939 | 2015 OY_{127} | — | July 25, 2015 | Haleakala | Pan-STARRS 1 | · | 1.8 km | MPC · JPL |
| 693940 | 2015 OE_{128} | — | July 23, 2015 | Haleakala | Pan-STARRS 1 | EOS | 1.4 km | MPC · JPL |
| 693941 | 2015 ON_{128} | — | July 25, 2015 | Haleakala | Pan-STARRS 1 | · | 1.5 km | MPC · JPL |
| 693942 | 2015 OP_{128} | — | July 25, 2015 | Haleakala | Pan-STARRS 1 | · | 2.5 km | MPC · JPL |
| 693943 | 2015 OA_{129} | — | July 25, 2015 | Haleakala | Pan-STARRS 1 | · | 2.3 km | MPC · JPL |
| 693944 | 2015 OG_{129} | — | July 28, 2015 | Haleakala | Pan-STARRS 1 | · | 1.4 km | MPC · JPL |
| 693945 | 2015 ON_{129} | — | July 24, 2015 | Haleakala | Pan-STARRS 1 | · | 1.4 km | MPC · JPL |
| 693946 | 2015 OE_{130} | — | July 25, 2015 | Haleakala | Pan-STARRS 1 | · | 1.2 km | MPC · JPL |
| 693947 | 2015 OF_{130} | — | July 24, 2015 | Haleakala | Pan-STARRS 1 | · | 2.7 km | MPC · JPL |
| 693948 | 2015 OQ_{131} | — | July 28, 2015 | Haleakala | Pan-STARRS 1 | · | 1.6 km | MPC · JPL |
| 693949 | 2015 OX_{131} | — | July 25, 2015 | Haleakala | Pan-STARRS 1 | EOS | 1.5 km | MPC · JPL |
| 693950 | 2015 OQ_{133} | — | July 23, 2015 | Haleakala | Pan-STARRS 1 | · | 1.5 km | MPC · JPL |
| 693951 | 2015 OU_{133} | — | July 24, 2015 | Haleakala | Pan-STARRS 1 | · | 1.6 km | MPC · JPL |
| 693952 | 2015 OB_{134} | — | July 26, 2015 | Haleakala | Pan-STARRS 1 | · | 1.7 km | MPC · JPL |
| 693953 | 2015 OJ_{134} | — | July 23, 2015 | Haleakala | Pan-STARRS 1 | · | 2.6 km | MPC · JPL |
| 693954 | 2015 OX_{134} | — | July 23, 2015 | Haleakala | Pan-STARRS 1 | EOS | 1.4 km | MPC · JPL |
| 693955 | 2015 ON_{143} | — | April 23, 2014 | Cerro Tololo | DECam | · | 1.2 km | MPC · JPL |
| 693956 | 2015 OZ_{143} | — | July 18, 2015 | Haleakala | Pan-STARRS 1 | EOS | 1.3 km | MPC · JPL |
| 693957 | 2015 OB_{147} | — | July 25, 2015 | Haleakala | Pan-STARRS 1 | EOS | 1.5 km | MPC · JPL |
| 693958 | 2015 OB_{148} | — | July 23, 2015 | Haleakala | Pan-STARRS 2 | · | 2.0 km | MPC · JPL |
| 693959 | 2015 OV_{148} | — | July 25, 2015 | Haleakala | Pan-STARRS 1 | EOS | 1.4 km | MPC · JPL |
| 693960 | 2015 OJ_{150} | — | July 23, 2015 | Haleakala | Pan-STARRS 1 | · | 2.1 km | MPC · JPL |
| 693961 | 2015 OS_{150} | — | July 25, 2015 | Haleakala | Pan-STARRS 1 | EOS | 1.5 km | MPC · JPL |
| 693962 | 2015 OW_{153} | — | July 19, 2015 | Haleakala | Pan-STARRS 1 | · | 2.2 km | MPC · JPL |
| 693963 | 2015 OD_{154} | — | July 25, 2015 | Haleakala | Pan-STARRS 1 | URS | 2.2 km | MPC · JPL |
| 693964 | 2015 OF_{156} | — | July 23, 2015 | Haleakala | Pan-STARRS 1 | · | 2.3 km | MPC · JPL |
| 693965 | 2015 OK_{157} | — | July 25, 2015 | Haleakala | Pan-STARRS 1 | · | 2.3 km | MPC · JPL |
| 693966 | 2015 OR_{157} | — | July 25, 2015 | Haleakala | Pan-STARRS 1 | · | 2.3 km | MPC · JPL |
| 693967 | 2015 OJ_{158} | — | July 25, 2015 | Haleakala | Pan-STARRS 1 | · | 1.9 km | MPC · JPL |
| 693968 | 2015 OY_{158} | — | July 24, 2015 | Haleakala | Pan-STARRS 1 | EOS | 1.5 km | MPC · JPL |
| 693969 | 2015 OZ_{158} | — | July 19, 2015 | Haleakala | Pan-STARRS 1 | · | 2.0 km | MPC · JPL |
| 693970 | 2015 OR_{159} | — | July 28, 2015 | Haleakala | Pan-STARRS 1 | EOS | 1.3 km | MPC · JPL |
| 693971 | 2015 OS_{159} | — | July 25, 2015 | Haleakala | Pan-STARRS 1 | · | 2.0 km | MPC · JPL |
| 693972 | 2015 OX_{159} | — | November 30, 2005 | Kitt Peak | Spacewatch | · | 1.9 km | MPC · JPL |
| 693973 | 2015 OO_{160} | — | July 19, 2015 | Haleakala | Pan-STARRS 1 | · | 1.5 km | MPC · JPL |
| 693974 | 2015 OH_{161} | — | July 24, 2015 | Haleakala | Pan-STARRS 1 | · | 1.4 km | MPC · JPL |
| 693975 | 2015 OJ_{166} | — | July 19, 2015 | Haleakala | Pan-STARRS 1 | · | 1.2 km | MPC · JPL |
| 693976 | 2015 OP_{166} | — | May 8, 2014 | Haleakala | Pan-STARRS 1 | · | 1.7 km | MPC · JPL |
| 693977 | 2015 OU_{166} | — | July 19, 2015 | Haleakala | Pan-STARRS 1 | · | 1.4 km | MPC · JPL |
| 693978 | 2015 OD_{168} | — | April 9, 2014 | Haleakala | Pan-STARRS 1 | · | 630 m | MPC · JPL |
| 693979 | 2015 OG_{174} | — | July 28, 2015 | Haleakala | Pan-STARRS 1 | · | 650 m | MPC · JPL |
| 693980 | 2015 OO_{174} | — | July 19, 2015 | Haleakala | Pan-STARRS 1 | KOR | 880 m | MPC · JPL |
| 693981 | 2015 PM_{13} | — | October 21, 2007 | Mount Lemmon | Mount Lemmon Survey | · | 1.6 km | MPC · JPL |
| 693982 | 2015 PE_{15} | — | June 13, 2015 | Haleakala | Pan-STARRS 1 | · | 1.5 km | MPC · JPL |
| 693983 | 2015 PW_{15} | — | November 29, 2011 | Kitt Peak | Spacewatch | · | 2.1 km | MPC · JPL |
| 693984 | 2015 PH_{16} | — | May 7, 2006 | Mount Lemmon | Mount Lemmon Survey | · | 1.3 km | MPC · JPL |
| 693985 | 2015 PB_{18} | — | September 20, 2011 | Mount Lemmon | Mount Lemmon Survey | · | 1.7 km | MPC · JPL |
| 693986 | 2015 PE_{18} | — | August 8, 2015 | Haleakala | Pan-STARRS 1 | · | 1.6 km | MPC · JPL |
| 693987 | 2015 PX_{20} | — | August 8, 2015 | Haleakala | Pan-STARRS 1 | · | 1.4 km | MPC · JPL |
| 693988 | 2015 PN_{22} | — | August 8, 2015 | Haleakala | Pan-STARRS 1 | · | 1.4 km | MPC · JPL |
| 693989 | 2015 PD_{23} | — | January 3, 2012 | Mount Lemmon | Mount Lemmon Survey | EOS | 1.5 km | MPC · JPL |
| 693990 | 2015 PH_{23} | — | August 8, 2015 | Haleakala | Pan-STARRS 1 | · | 2.2 km | MPC · JPL |
| 693991 | 2015 PD_{25} | — | July 24, 2015 | Haleakala | Pan-STARRS 1 | · | 1.8 km | MPC · JPL |
| 693992 | 2015 PX_{25} | — | July 18, 2015 | Haleakala | Pan-STARRS 1 | · | 1.5 km | MPC · JPL |
| 693993 | 2015 PM_{31} | — | July 23, 2015 | Haleakala | Pan-STARRS 1 | · | 2.0 km | MPC · JPL |
| 693994 | 2015 PE_{35} | — | August 10, 2015 | Haleakala | Pan-STARRS 1 | · | 2.0 km | MPC · JPL |
| 693995 | 2015 PW_{43} | — | July 24, 2015 | Haleakala | Pan-STARRS 1 | EOS | 1.3 km | MPC · JPL |
| 693996 | 2015 PE_{44} | — | August 9, 2015 | Haleakala | Pan-STARRS 1 | EOS | 1.4 km | MPC · JPL |
| 693997 | 2015 PM_{47} | — | December 23, 2012 | Haleakala | Pan-STARRS 1 | · | 1.2 km | MPC · JPL |
| 693998 | 2015 PV_{50} | — | November 7, 2010 | Kitt Peak | Spacewatch | · | 3.0 km | MPC · JPL |
| 693999 | 2015 PA_{51} | — | October 25, 2005 | Mount Lemmon | Mount Lemmon Survey | · | 1.9 km | MPC · JPL |
| 694000 | 2015 PN_{52} | — | January 10, 2013 | Mount Lemmon | Mount Lemmon Survey | · | 1.5 km | MPC · JPL |

back to top

== Meaning of names ==
As minor planet discoveries are confirmed, they are given a permanent number by the IAU's Minor Planet Center (MPC), and the discoverers can then submit names for them, following the IAU's naming conventions. The list below concerns those minor planets in the specified number-range that have received names, and explains the meanings of those names.

Official naming citations of newly named small Solar System bodies are approved and published in a bulletin by IAU's Working Group for Small Bodies Nomenclature (WGSBN). Before May 2021, citations were published in MPC's Minor Planet Circulars for many decades. Recent citations can also be found on the JPL Small-Body Database (SBDB). Until his death in 2016, German astronomer Lutz D. Schmadel compiled these citations into the Dictionary of Minor Planet Names (DMP) and regularly updated the collection.

Based on Paul Herget's The Names of the Minor Planets, Schmadel also researched the unclear origin of numerous asteroids, most of which had been named prior to World War II. This article incorporates text from this source, which is in the public domain: SBDB New namings may only be added to this list below after official publication as the preannouncement of names is condemned. The WGSBN publishes a comprehensive guideline for the naming rules of non-cometary small Solar System bodies.

| Named minor planet | Provisional | This minor planet was named for... | Ref · Catalog |
|---|---|---|---|
| 693043 Suhay | 2015 DC_{129} | Erika Suhay (b. 1941), a retired Romanian professor of mathematics and astronomy who graduated in Astronomy at the University of Bucharest. | IAU · 693043 |
