= List of minor planets: 698001–699000 =

The following is a partial list of minor planets, running from minor-planet number 698001 through 699000, inclusive. The primary data for this and other partial lists is based on JPL's "Small-Body Orbital Elements" and data available from the Minor Planet Center. Critical list information is also provided by the MPC, unless otherwise specified from Lowell Observatory. A detailed description of the table's columns and additional sources are given on the main page including a complete list of every page in this series, and a statistical break-up on the dynamical classification of minor planets.

Also see the summary list of all named bodies in numerical and alphabetical order, and the corresponding naming citations for the number range of this particular list. New namings may only be added to this list after official publication, as the preannouncement of names is condemned by the Working Group for Small Bodies Nomenclature of the International Astronomical Union.

Near-Earth obj.	MBA (inner)	MBA (outer)	Centaur
Mars-crosser	MBA (middle)	Jupiter trojan	Trans-Neptunian obj.
Unclassified

== 698001–698100 ==
Designation			Discovery			Properties		Ref
Permanent	Provisional	Named after	Date	Site	Discoverer(s)	Category	Diam.	Ref
698001	2017 SM_{4}	—	October 18, 2012	Mount Lemmon	Mount Lemmon Survey	H	330 m	MPC · JPL
698002	2017 SR_{7}	—	September 16, 2017	Haleakala	Pan-STARRS 1	·	1.5 km	MPC · JPL
698003	2017 SC_{15}	—	September 19, 2017	Haleakala	Pan-STARRS 1	·	1.2 km	MPC · JPL
698004	2017 SW_{22}	—	September 15, 2013	Mount Lemmon	Mount Lemmon Survey	·	1.2 km	MPC · JPL
698005	2017 SB_{35}	—	September 25, 2017	Haleakala	Pan-STARRS 1	HNS	970 m	MPC · JPL
698006	2017 SH_{46}	—	September 21, 2009	Kitt Peak	Spacewatch	·	1.2 km	MPC · JPL
698007	2017 SA_{47}	—	January 17, 2015	Haleakala	Pan-STARRS 1	·	1.3 km	MPC · JPL
698008	2017 SO_{49}	—	September 16, 2017	Haleakala	Pan-STARRS 1	·	1.2 km	MPC · JPL
698009	2017 SQ_{49}	—	September 6, 2013	Kitt Peak	Spacewatch	·	930 m	MPC · JPL
698010	2017 SO_{51}	—	August 12, 2013	Haleakala	Pan-STARRS 1	V	480 m	MPC · JPL
698011	2017 SX_{56}	—	July 30, 2017	Haleakala	Pan-STARRS 1	PHO	750 m	MPC · JPL
698012	2017 ST_{57}	—	May 1, 2016	Cerro Tololo	DECam	·	550 m	MPC · JPL
698013	2017 SY_{57}	—	October 19, 2003	Apache Point	SDSS Collaboration	·	710 m	MPC · JPL
698014	2017 SW_{59}	—	August 20, 2017	Haleakala	Pan-STARRS 1	·	820 m	MPC · JPL
698015	2017 SR_{60}	—	May 5, 2008	Mount Lemmon	Mount Lemmon Survey	·	760 m	MPC · JPL
698016	2017 SB_{61}	—	November 9, 2013	Haleakala	Pan-STARRS 1	·	1.3 km	MPC · JPL
698017	2017 ST_{63}	—	February 10, 2011	Mount Lemmon	Mount Lemmon Survey	·	1.3 km	MPC · JPL
698018	2017 SP_{65}	—	November 17, 2009	Mount Lemmon	Mount Lemmon Survey	·	1.0 km	MPC · JPL
698019	2017 SO_{66}	—	August 21, 2006	Kitt Peak	Spacewatch	·	2.2 km	MPC · JPL
698020	2017 SD_{74}	—	January 14, 2015	Haleakala	Pan-STARRS 1	HNS	720 m	MPC · JPL
698021	2017 SY_{76}	—	November 14, 1995	Kitt Peak	Spacewatch	·	1.3 km	MPC · JPL
698022	2017 ST_{81}	—	March 9, 2007	Kitt Peak	Spacewatch	·	750 m	MPC · JPL
698023	2017 SO_{82}	—	February 25, 2011	Mount Lemmon	Mount Lemmon Survey	·	1.2 km	MPC · JPL
698024	2017 SM_{83}	—	November 9, 2013	Haleakala	Pan-STARRS 1	·	840 m	MPC · JPL
698025	2017 SN_{83}	—	September 4, 2008	Kitt Peak	Spacewatch	NEM	1.7 km	MPC · JPL
698026	2017 SO_{83}	—	October 29, 2005	Mount Lemmon	Mount Lemmon Survey	·	740 m	MPC · JPL
698027	2017 SQ_{83}	—	June 3, 2008	Kitt Peak	Spacewatch	·	810 m	MPC · JPL
698028	2017 SD_{91}	—	September 25, 2013	Mount Lemmon	Mount Lemmon Survey	MAR	780 m	MPC · JPL
698029	2017 SC_{92}	—	August 20, 2017	Haleakala	Pan-STARRS 1	·	1.1 km	MPC · JPL
698030	2017 SW_{92}	—	October 1, 2013	Mount Lemmon	Mount Lemmon Survey	·	800 m	MPC · JPL
698031	2017 SR_{103}	—	March 14, 2011	Mount Lemmon	Mount Lemmon Survey	·	1.7 km	MPC · JPL
698032	2017 ST_{104}	—	September 23, 2008	Mount Lemmon	Mount Lemmon Survey	·	1.6 km	MPC · JPL
698033	2017 SX_{108}	—	October 26, 2009	Mount Lemmon	Mount Lemmon Survey	·	1.1 km	MPC · JPL
698034	2017 SF_{109}	—	July 29, 2017	Haleakala	Pan-STARRS 1	·	1.0 km	MPC · JPL
698035	2017 SZ_{109}	—	November 1, 2013	Kitt Peak	Spacewatch	·	1.4 km	MPC · JPL
698036	2017 SO_{110}	—	March 4, 2006	Kitt Peak	Spacewatch	·	1.4 km	MPC · JPL
698037	2017 ST_{115}	—	July 1, 2013	Siding Spring	SSS	·	1.3 km	MPC · JPL
698038	2017 SH_{116}	—	December 1, 2008	Socorro	LINEAR	·	1.5 km	MPC · JPL
698039	2017 SS_{117}	—	October 3, 2008	Mount Lemmon	Mount Lemmon Survey	·	1.3 km	MPC · JPL
698040	2017 SW_{121}	—	February 15, 2015	Haleakala	Pan-STARRS 1	·	1.2 km	MPC · JPL
698041	2017 SU_{124}	—	July 14, 2013	Haleakala	Pan-STARRS 1	·	860 m	MPC · JPL
698042	2017 SS_{125}	—	August 1, 2017	Haleakala	Pan-STARRS 1	·	1.2 km	MPC · JPL
698043	2017 SB_{127}	—	November 2, 2008	Mount Lemmon	Mount Lemmon Survey	·	1.4 km	MPC · JPL
698044	2017 SL_{131}	—	September 17, 2013	Mount Lemmon	Mount Lemmon Survey	·	860 m	MPC · JPL
698045	2017 SZ_{132}	—	September 23, 2017	Haleakala	Pan-STARRS 1	·	1.4 km	MPC · JPL
698046	2017 SA_{133}	—	September 26, 2017	Mount Lemmon	Mount Lemmon Survey	MAR	850 m	MPC · JPL
698047	2017 SM_{135}	—	November 28, 2013	Haleakala	Pan-STARRS 1	·	1.1 km	MPC · JPL
698048	2017 SV_{138}	—	September 22, 2017	Haleakala	Pan-STARRS 1	·	1.1 km	MPC · JPL
698049	2017 SK_{140}	—	September 27, 2017	Mount Lemmon	Mount Lemmon Survey	·	1.4 km	MPC · JPL
698050	2017 SK_{147}	—	September 23, 2017	Haleakala	Pan-STARRS 1	·	1.9 km	MPC · JPL
698051	2017 SV_{151}	—	September 26, 2017	Haleakala	Pan-STARRS 1	·	1.1 km	MPC · JPL
698052	2017 SJ_{152}	—	September 30, 2017	Mount Lemmon	Mount Lemmon Survey	·	1.7 km	MPC · JPL
698053	2017 SV_{152}	—	September 24, 2017	Haleakala	Pan-STARRS 1	·	970 m	MPC · JPL
698054	2017 SJ_{167}	—	September 24, 2017	Haleakala	Pan-STARRS 1	·	1.3 km	MPC · JPL
698055	2017 SN_{187}	—	September 29, 2017	Haleakala	Pan-STARRS 1	·	1.5 km	MPC · JPL
698056	2017 SD_{190}	—	September 17, 2017	Haleakala	Pan-STARRS 1	HNS	940 m	MPC · JPL
698057	2017 SF_{190}	—	September 16, 2017	Haleakala	Pan-STARRS 1	GEF	1.0 km	MPC · JPL
698058	2017 SK_{192}	—	September 24, 2017	Haleakala	Pan-STARRS 1	·	1.1 km	MPC · JPL
698059	2017 SW_{196}	—	September 30, 2017	Haleakala	Pan-STARRS 1	EUN	1.0 km	MPC · JPL
698060	2017 SZ_{196}	—	September 26, 2017	Haleakala	Pan-STARRS 1	PAD	1.2 km	MPC · JPL
698061	2017 SB_{198}	—	September 24, 2017	Haleakala	Pan-STARRS 1	·	1.2 km	MPC · JPL
698062	2017 SD_{198}	—	September 17, 2017	Haleakala	Pan-STARRS 1	·	1.4 km	MPC · JPL
698063	2017 SR_{198}	—	September 27, 2017	Haleakala	Pan-STARRS 1	·	1.4 km	MPC · JPL
698064	2017 ST_{198}	—	September 24, 2017	Haleakala	Pan-STARRS 1	·	1.3 km	MPC · JPL
698065	2017 SB_{199}	—	September 26, 2017	Haleakala	Pan-STARRS 1	·	1.5 km	MPC · JPL
698066	2017 SL_{199}	—	September 19, 2017	Haleakala	Pan-STARRS 1	(5)	880 m	MPC · JPL
698067	2017 SN_{199}	—	September 23, 2017	Haleakala	Pan-STARRS 1	·	990 m	MPC · JPL
698068	2017 ST_{199}	—	September 16, 2017	Haleakala	Pan-STARRS 1	·	910 m	MPC · JPL
698069	2017 SZ_{199}	—	September 24, 2017	Haleakala	Pan-STARRS 1	·	1.5 km	MPC · JPL
698070	2017 SJ_{200}	—	September 19, 2017	Haleakala	Pan-STARRS 1	(5)	1.1 km	MPC · JPL
698071	2017 SL_{200}	—	September 24, 2017	Haleakala	Pan-STARRS 1	·	1.2 km	MPC · JPL
698072	2017 SL_{203}	—	September 19, 2017	Haleakala	Pan-STARRS 1	·	940 m	MPC · JPL
698073	2017 ST_{203}	—	September 27, 2017	Mount Lemmon	Mount Lemmon Survey	H	340 m	MPC · JPL
698074	2017 SC_{205}	—	September 16, 2017	Haleakala	Pan-STARRS 1	GEF	810 m	MPC · JPL
698075	2017 ST_{205}	—	September 17, 2017	Haleakala	Pan-STARRS 1	AGN	970 m	MPC · JPL
698076	2017 SC_{206}	—	September 23, 2017	Haleakala	Pan-STARRS 1	·	790 m	MPC · JPL
698077	2017 SG_{206}	—	September 30, 2017	Haleakala	Pan-STARRS 1	·	1.3 km	MPC · JPL
698078	2017 SK_{207}	—	September 30, 2017	Haleakala	Pan-STARRS 1	·	1.4 km	MPC · JPL
698079	2017 SL_{207}	—	September 17, 2017	Haleakala	Pan-STARRS 1	·	1.4 km	MPC · JPL
698080	2017 SO_{208}	—	September 24, 2017	Haleakala	Pan-STARRS 1	·	1.3 km	MPC · JPL
698081	2017 SP_{208}	—	September 19, 2017	Haleakala	Pan-STARRS 1	·	1.5 km	MPC · JPL
698082	2017 SS_{208}	—	September 25, 2017	Haleakala	Pan-STARRS 1	·	950 m	MPC · JPL
698083	2017 SE_{209}	—	September 24, 2017	Haleakala	Pan-STARRS 1	·	1.1 km	MPC · JPL
698084	2017 SF_{209}	—	September 24, 2017	Haleakala	Pan-STARRS 1	·	1.2 km	MPC · JPL
698085	2017 SE_{210}	—	September 30, 2017	Haleakala	Pan-STARRS 1	·	1.3 km	MPC · JPL
698086	2017 SJ_{210}	—	September 25, 2017	Haleakala	Pan-STARRS 1	·	1.2 km	MPC · JPL
698087	2017 ST_{210}	—	April 11, 2015	Mount Lemmon	Mount Lemmon Survey	·	1.3 km	MPC · JPL
698088	2017 SG_{211}	—	August 31, 2017	Haleakala	Pan-STARRS 1	MAR	720 m	MPC · JPL
698089	2017 SU_{211}	—	September 26, 2017	Haleakala	Pan-STARRS 1	EUN	920 m	MPC · JPL
698090	2017 SV_{211}	—	September 17, 2017	Haleakala	Pan-STARRS 1	HNS	840 m	MPC · JPL
698091	2017 SN_{212}	—	April 20, 2015	Haleakala	Pan-STARRS 1	AGN	950 m	MPC · JPL
698092	2017 SV_{212}	—	September 25, 2017	Haleakala	Pan-STARRS 1	·	1.3 km	MPC · JPL
698093	2017 SW_{212}	—	September 30, 2017	Haleakala	Pan-STARRS 1	MAR	690 m	MPC · JPL
698094	2017 SZ_{212}	—	September 25, 2017	Haleakala	Pan-STARRS 1	·	1.0 km	MPC · JPL
698095	2017 SA_{213}	—	September 23, 2017	Haleakala	Pan-STARRS 1	·	1.1 km	MPC · JPL
698096	2017 SE_{214}	—	October 6, 2008	Mount Lemmon	Mount Lemmon Survey	HOF	2.0 km	MPC · JPL
698097	2017 SS_{215}	—	September 17, 2017	Haleakala	Pan-STARRS 1	·	1.2 km	MPC · JPL
698098	2017 SN_{219}	—	September 23, 2017	Haleakala	Pan-STARRS 1	·	1.3 km	MPC · JPL
698099	2017 SR_{223}	—	September 23, 2017	Haleakala	Pan-STARRS 1	·	1.1 km	MPC · JPL
698100	2017 SZ_{223}	—	September 25, 2017	Haleakala	Pan-STARRS 1	·	1.1 km	MPC · JPL

== 698101–698200 ==
back to top

Designation			Discovery			Properties		Ref
Permanent	Provisional	Named after	Date	Site	Discoverer(s)	Category	Diam.	Ref
698101	2017 ST_{225}	—	September 30, 2017	Haleakala	Pan-STARRS 1	·	910 m	MPC · JPL
698102	2017 SX_{225}	—	September 25, 2017	Haleakala	Pan-STARRS 1	·	960 m	MPC · JPL
698103	2017 SB_{226}	—	September 25, 2017	Haleakala	Pan-STARRS 1	·	1.2 km	MPC · JPL
698104	2017 SF_{226}	—	September 21, 2017	Haleakala	Pan-STARRS 1	·	1.1 km	MPC · JPL
698105	2017 SD_{227}	—	September 19, 2017	Haleakala	Pan-STARRS 1	·	700 m	MPC · JPL
698106	2017 SH_{247}	—	September 19, 2017	Haleakala	Pan-STARRS 1	·	1 km	MPC · JPL
698107	2017 SQ_{247}	—	September 19, 2017	Haleakala	Pan-STARRS 1	·	1.0 km	MPC · JPL
698108	2017 SF_{255}	—	September 21, 2017	Haleakala	Pan-STARRS 1	BRG	1.1 km	MPC · JPL
698109	2017 SO_{255}	—	September 21, 2017	Haleakala	Pan-STARRS 1	WAT	1.2 km	MPC · JPL
698110	2017 SH_{256}	—	September 30, 2017	Mount Lemmon	Mount Lemmon Survey	·	1.5 km	MPC · JPL
698111	2017 SA_{266}	—	September 19, 2017	Haleakala	Pan-STARRS 1	·	1.4 km	MPC · JPL
698112	2017 ST_{274}	—	January 20, 2015	Haleakala	Pan-STARRS 1	·	970 m	MPC · JPL
698113	2017 SP_{278}	—	September 17, 2017	Haleakala	Pan-STARRS 1	·	1.3 km	MPC · JPL
698114	2017 SJ_{282}	—	September 21, 2017	Haleakala	Pan-STARRS 1	EUN	960 m	MPC · JPL
698115	2017 SP_{284}	—	September 19, 2017	Haleakala	Pan-STARRS 1	·	1.0 km	MPC · JPL
698116	2017 SP_{285}	—	September 19, 2017	Haleakala	Pan-STARRS 1	·	860 m	MPC · JPL
698117	2017 SX_{297}	—	September 21, 2017	Haleakala	Pan-STARRS 1	H	320 m	MPC · JPL
698118	2017 SG_{305}	—	January 6, 2003	Kitt Peak	Deep Lens Survey	EOS	1.2 km	MPC · JPL
698119	2017 SH_{306}	—	October 1, 2013	Mount Lemmon	Mount Lemmon Survey	·	830 m	MPC · JPL
698120	2017 SK_{307}	—	September 16, 2017	Haleakala	Pan-STARRS 1	·	1.6 km	MPC · JPL
698121	2017 SL_{307}	—	September 24, 2017	Haleakala	Pan-STARRS 1	·	840 m	MPC · JPL
698122	2017 SW_{321}	—	November 27, 2013	Haleakala	Pan-STARRS 1	·	1.3 km	MPC · JPL
698123	2017 SY_{369}	—	August 17, 2012	Haleakala	Pan-STARRS 1	·	1.2 km	MPC · JPL
698124	2017 TP_{3}	—	October 21, 2004	Socorro	LINEAR	H	510 m	MPC · JPL
698125	2017 TT_{9}	—	January 13, 2004	Kitt Peak	Spacewatch	MAS	690 m	MPC · JPL
698126	2017 TU_{10}	—	August 20, 2004	Kitt Peak	Spacewatch	·	1.1 km	MPC · JPL
698127	2017 TV_{10}	—	February 17, 2015	Haleakala	Pan-STARRS 1	·	1.7 km	MPC · JPL
698128	2017 TP_{12}	—	August 17, 2013	Elena Remote	Oreshko, A.	·	1.0 km	MPC · JPL
698129	2017 TK_{13}	—	September 21, 2017	Haleakala	Pan-STARRS 1	·	780 m	MPC · JPL
698130	2017 TE_{21}	—	November 27, 2013	Haleakala	Pan-STARRS 1	·	1.1 km	MPC · JPL
698131	2017 TC_{25}	—	September 15, 2017	Haleakala	Pan-STARRS 1	·	1.3 km	MPC · JPL
698132	2017 TM_{25}	—	September 23, 2017	Haleakala	Pan-STARRS 1	·	1.3 km	MPC · JPL
698133	2017 TB_{26}	—	October 14, 2017	Mount Lemmon	Mount Lemmon Survey	·	1.0 km	MPC · JPL
698134	2017 TN_{27}	—	October 15, 2017	Mount Lemmon	Mount Lemmon Survey	PAD	1.3 km	MPC · JPL
698135	2017 TY_{27}	—	October 14, 2017	Mount Lemmon	Mount Lemmon Survey	·	850 m	MPC · JPL
698136	2017 TJ_{30}	—	May 3, 2016	Cerro Tololo	DECam	·	1.2 km	MPC · JPL
698137	2017 TL_{31}	—	October 15, 2017	Mount Lemmon	Mount Lemmon Survey	·	970 m	MPC · JPL
698138	2017 TY_{36}	—	October 11, 2017	Haleakala	Pan-STARRS 1	·	740 m	MPC · JPL
698139	2017 TW_{39}	—	September 13, 2017	Haleakala	Pan-STARRS 1	·	1.3 km	MPC · JPL
698140	2017 UY_{2}	—	January 3, 2013	Observatorio Cala	B. Linero, I. de la Cueva	H	470 m	MPC · JPL
698141	2017 UX_{3}	—	October 14, 2009	Mount Lemmon	Mount Lemmon Survey	H	550 m	MPC · JPL
698142	2017 UB_{7}	—	September 20, 2009	Kitt Peak	Spacewatch	H	270 m	MPC · JPL
698143	2017 UE_{16}	—	November 28, 2013	Haleakala	Pan-STARRS 1	JUN	790 m	MPC · JPL
698144	2017 UO_{23}	—	October 19, 2010	Mount Lemmon	Mount Lemmon Survey	·	710 m	MPC · JPL
698145	2017 UB_{31}	—	October 4, 2013	Mount Lemmon	Mount Lemmon Survey	HNS	730 m	MPC · JPL
698146	2017 UE_{32}	—	August 7, 2008	Kitt Peak	Spacewatch	·	1.2 km	MPC · JPL
698147	2017 US_{34}	—	September 24, 2017	Mount Lemmon	Mount Lemmon Survey	·	1.4 km	MPC · JPL
698148	2017 UF_{38}	—	December 12, 2013	Haleakala	Pan-STARRS 1	EUN	1.0 km	MPC · JPL
698149	2017 UC_{42}	—	January 25, 2009	Kitt Peak	Spacewatch	·	1.5 km	MPC · JPL
698150	2017 US_{43}	—	September 1, 2017	Haleakala	Pan-STARRS 1	H	480 m	MPC · JPL
698151	2017 UW_{43}	—	October 22, 2008	Socorro	LINEAR	BAR	1.0 km	MPC · JPL
698152	2017 UN_{49}	—	April 15, 2008	Mount Lemmon	Mount Lemmon Survey	·	790 m	MPC · JPL
698153	2017 UJ_{51}	—	December 13, 2015	Haleakala	Pan-STARRS 1	H	470 m	MPC · JPL
698154	2017 UE_{53}	—	October 29, 2017	Haleakala	Pan-STARRS 1	·	1.5 km	MPC · JPL
698155	2017 UC_{55}	—	April 19, 2015	Cerro Tololo	DECam	·	1.3 km	MPC · JPL
698156	2017 UH_{55}	—	October 8, 2008	Catalina	CSS	·	1.6 km	MPC · JPL
698157	2017 UP_{57}	—	October 16, 2017	Mount Lemmon	Mount Lemmon Survey	·	1.3 km	MPC · JPL
698158	2017 UA_{64}	—	October 21, 2017	Mount Lemmon	Mount Lemmon Survey	·	860 m	MPC · JPL
698159	2017 UW_{68}	—	October 30, 2017	Haleakala	Pan-STARRS 1	EOS	1.4 km	MPC · JPL
698160	2017 UC_{74}	—	November 18, 2008	Kitt Peak	Spacewatch	·	1.1 km	MPC · JPL
698161	2017 UW_{74}	—	November 11, 2004	Kitt Peak	Spacewatch	·	1.2 km	MPC · JPL
698162	2017 UY_{74}	—	September 26, 2008	Kitt Peak	Spacewatch	·	1.4 km	MPC · JPL
698163	2017 UA_{75}	—	October 21, 2017	Mount Lemmon	Mount Lemmon Survey	·	1.3 km	MPC · JPL
698164	2017 UZ_{82}	—	October 30, 2017	Haleakala	Pan-STARRS 1	·	1.4 km	MPC · JPL
698165	2017 UD_{84}	—	April 19, 2015	Cerro Tololo	DECam	·	1.2 km	MPC · JPL
698166	2017 UX_{88}	—	October 28, 2017	Haleakala	Pan-STARRS 1	·	1.1 km	MPC · JPL
698167	2017 UO_{90}	—	November 9, 2009	Kitt Peak	Spacewatch	·	1.0 km	MPC · JPL
698168	2017 UR_{92}	—	October 24, 2017	Mount Lemmon	Mount Lemmon Survey	BRA	870 m	MPC · JPL
698169	2017 UH_{93}	—	May 22, 2015	Kitt Peak	M. W. Buie	·	1.3 km	MPC · JPL
698170	2017 UL_{93}	—	October 22, 2017	Mount Lemmon	Mount Lemmon Survey	·	1.0 km	MPC · JPL
698171	2017 UG_{94}	—	October 30, 2017	Haleakala	Pan-STARRS 1	·	1.5 km	MPC · JPL
698172	2017 UA_{96}	—	August 14, 2012	Haleakala	Pan-STARRS 1	·	1.4 km	MPC · JPL
698173	2017 UH_{96}	—	October 22, 2017	Mount Lemmon	Mount Lemmon Survey	H	360 m	MPC · JPL
698174	2017 UK_{96}	—	October 28, 2017	Haleakala	Pan-STARRS 1	·	1.4 km	MPC · JPL
698175	2017 UM_{96}	—	October 28, 2017	Mount Lemmon	Mount Lemmon Survey	·	820 m	MPC · JPL
698176	2017 UN_{96}	—	October 23, 2017	Mount Lemmon	Mount Lemmon Survey	·	1.2 km	MPC · JPL
698177	2017 UW_{96}	—	April 19, 2015	Mount Lemmon	Mount Lemmon Survey	·	1.3 km	MPC · JPL
698178	2017 UR_{97}	—	October 27, 2017	Mount Lemmon	Mount Lemmon Survey	·	1.2 km	MPC · JPL
698179	2017 UA_{98}	—	October 29, 2017	Haleakala	Pan-STARRS 1	·	1.8 km	MPC · JPL
698180	2017 UC_{99}	—	October 23, 2017	Mount Lemmon	Mount Lemmon Survey	·	1.3 km	MPC · JPL
698181	2017 UU_{100}	—	October 22, 2017	Kitt Peak	Spacewatch	EUN	930 m	MPC · JPL
698182	2017 UX_{100}	—	April 18, 2015	Cerro Tololo	DECam	NEM	1.6 km	MPC · JPL
698183	2017 UA_{101}	—	October 18, 2017	Mount Lemmon	Mount Lemmon Survey	·	1.4 km	MPC · JPL
698184	2017 UD_{101}	—	October 27, 2017	Haleakala	Pan-STARRS 1	·	1.2 km	MPC · JPL
698185	2017 UO_{101}	—	October 27, 2017	Haleakala	Pan-STARRS 1	·	860 m	MPC · JPL
698186	2017 UP_{101}	—	October 21, 2017	Mount Lemmon	Mount Lemmon Survey	(5)	860 m	MPC · JPL
698187	2017 UQ_{101}	—	October 28, 2017	Haleakala	Pan-STARRS 1	·	1.1 km	MPC · JPL
698188	2017 UQ_{102}	—	April 18, 2015	Cerro Tololo	DECam	·	1.2 km	MPC · JPL
698189	2017 US_{102}	—	October 29, 2017	Haleakala	Pan-STARRS 1	HOF	2.0 km	MPC · JPL
698190	2017 UK_{103}	—	October 27, 2017	Haleakala	Pan-STARRS 1	·	940 m	MPC · JPL
698191	2017 UL_{103}	—	October 24, 2017	Mount Lemmon	Mount Lemmon Survey	·	970 m	MPC · JPL
698192	2017 UM_{103}	—	October 21, 2017	Mount Lemmon	Mount Lemmon Survey	MAR	780 m	MPC · JPL
698193	2017 UR_{105}	—	October 28, 2017	Haleakala	Pan-STARRS 1	·	1 km	MPC · JPL
698194	2017 UC_{106}	—	September 24, 2017	Haleakala	Pan-STARRS 1	·	1.4 km	MPC · JPL
698195	2017 UK_{106}	—	October 30, 2017	Haleakala	Pan-STARRS 1	·	1.1 km	MPC · JPL
698196	2017 UN_{106}	—	October 30, 2017	Haleakala	Pan-STARRS 1	·	1.1 km	MPC · JPL
698197	2017 UW_{106}	—	October 23, 2017	Mount Lemmon	Mount Lemmon Survey	·	1.5 km	MPC · JPL
698198	2017 UX_{106}	—	October 27, 2017	Haleakala	Pan-STARRS 1	·	1.3 km	MPC · JPL
698199	2017 UZ_{106}	—	October 17, 2012	Mount Lemmon	Mount Lemmon Survey	·	1.5 km	MPC · JPL
698200	2017 UA_{107}	—	October 23, 2017	Mount Lemmon	Mount Lemmon Survey	·	1.4 km	MPC · JPL

== 698201–698300 ==
back to top

Designation			Discovery			Properties		Ref
Permanent	Provisional	Named after	Date	Site	Discoverer(s)	Category	Diam.	Ref
698201	2017 UH_{107}	—	October 24, 2017	Mount Lemmon	Mount Lemmon Survey	·	1.3 km	MPC · JPL
698202	2017 UL_{107}	—	October 27, 2017	Haleakala	Pan-STARRS 1	WIT	700 m	MPC · JPL
698203	2017 UD_{108}	—	October 27, 2017	Haleakala	Pan-STARRS 1	·	1.5 km	MPC · JPL
698204	2017 UU_{108}	—	January 1, 2014	Haleakala	Pan-STARRS 1	·	1.4 km	MPC · JPL
698205	2017 UK_{109}	—	October 28, 2017	Haleakala	Pan-STARRS 1	PAD	1.2 km	MPC · JPL
698206	2017 UR_{109}	—	October 29, 2017	Haleakala	Pan-STARRS 1	EUN	710 m	MPC · JPL
698207	2017 UG_{111}	—	October 27, 2017	Mount Lemmon	Mount Lemmon Survey	·	550 m	MPC · JPL
698208	2017 UG_{114}	—	October 28, 2017	Mount Lemmon	Mount Lemmon Survey	·	990 m	MPC · JPL
698209	2017 UR_{114}	—	October 15, 2017	Mount Lemmon	Mount Lemmon Survey	·	1.2 km	MPC · JPL
698210	2017 UC_{118}	—	September 26, 2017	Haleakala	Pan-STARRS 1	·	1.0 km	MPC · JPL
698211	2017 UF_{121}	—	October 28, 2017	Mount Lemmon	Mount Lemmon Survey	·	1.4 km	MPC · JPL
698212	2017 UP_{122}	—	October 22, 2017	Mount Lemmon	Mount Lemmon Survey	·	850 m	MPC · JPL
698213	2017 UR_{123}	—	March 29, 2015	Haleakala	Pan-STARRS 1	·	1.4 km	MPC · JPL
698214	2017 UM_{133}	—	April 19, 2015	Cerro Tololo	DECam	·	1.2 km	MPC · JPL
698215	2017 UZ_{137}	—	April 18, 2015	Cerro Tololo	DECam	·	1.4 km	MPC · JPL
698216	2017 UD_{138}	—	October 30, 2017	Haleakala	Pan-STARRS 1	·	1.2 km	MPC · JPL
698217	2017 UJ_{139}	—	October 16, 2017	Mount Lemmon	Mount Lemmon Survey	·	1.6 km	MPC · JPL
698218	2017 UY_{141}	—	October 29, 2017	Haleakala	Pan-STARRS 1	·	1.2 km	MPC · JPL
698219	2017 UK_{144}	—	October 27, 2017	Haleakala	Pan-STARRS 1	·	1.6 km	MPC · JPL
698220	2017 UR_{146}	—	April 18, 2015	Cerro Tololo	DECam	·	1.5 km	MPC · JPL
698221	2017 UH_{154}	—	October 29, 2017	Mount Lemmon	Mount Lemmon Survey	EUN	1.0 km	MPC · JPL
698222	2017 UU_{154}	—	October 30, 2017	Haleakala	Pan-STARRS 1	·	1.5 km	MPC · JPL
698223	2017 UN_{157}	—	April 18, 2015	Cerro Tololo	DECam	·	1.1 km	MPC · JPL
698224	2017 UB_{158}	—	October 28, 2017	Haleakala	Pan-STARRS 1	·	1.5 km	MPC · JPL
698225	2017 UB_{162}	—	October 2, 2008	Kitt Peak	Spacewatch	·	1.2 km	MPC · JPL
698226	2017 UZ_{164}	—	April 18, 2015	Cerro Tololo	DECam	·	1.4 km	MPC · JPL
698227	2017 UE_{165}	—	March 22, 2015	Haleakala	Pan-STARRS 1	HNS	720 m	MPC · JPL
698228	2017 UX_{166}	—	October 29, 2017	Haleakala	Pan-STARRS 1	EUN	960 m	MPC · JPL
698229	2017 UC_{168}	—	February 18, 2015	Mount Lemmon	Mount Lemmon Survey	·	840 m	MPC · JPL
698230	2017 US_{169}	—	October 29, 2017	Mount Lemmon	Mount Lemmon Survey	·	1.0 km	MPC · JPL
698231	2017 UK_{184}	—	October 28, 2017	Haleakala	Pan-STARRS 1	·	920 m	MPC · JPL
698232	2017 UN_{192}	—	October 27, 2017	Mount Lemmon	Mount Lemmon Survey	H	490 m	MPC · JPL
698233	2017 UN_{218}	—	October 28, 2017	Haleakala	Pan-STARRS 1	GEF	790 m	MPC · JPL
698234	2017 VK_{8}	—	October 19, 2017	Haleakala	Pan-STARRS 1	·	1.2 km	MPC · JPL
698235	2017 VB_{9}	—	October 12, 2007	Kitt Peak	Spacewatch	·	1.4 km	MPC · JPL
698236	2017 VZ_{9}	—	August 13, 2012	Kitt Peak	Spacewatch	·	1.5 km	MPC · JPL
698237	2017 VC_{11}	—	October 9, 2008	Mount Lemmon	Mount Lemmon Survey	·	1.4 km	MPC · JPL
698238	2017 VD_{17}	—	May 3, 2008	Mount Lemmon	Mount Lemmon Survey	H	400 m	MPC · JPL
698239	2017 VN_{19}	—	October 22, 2008	Kitt Peak	Spacewatch	DOR	1.9 km	MPC · JPL
698240	2017 VZ_{21}	—	April 11, 2015	Mount Lemmon	Mount Lemmon Survey	·	1.6 km	MPC · JPL
698241	2017 VQ_{22}	—	October 27, 2017	Mount Lemmon	Mount Lemmon Survey	·	1.0 km	MPC · JPL
698242	2017 VR_{22}	—	November 1, 2013	Kitt Peak	Spacewatch	(5)	1.0 km	MPC · JPL
698243	2017 VT_{22}	—	April 19, 2015	Mount Lemmon	Mount Lemmon Survey	AGN	870 m	MPC · JPL
698244	2017 VJ_{23}	—	February 27, 2015	Haleakala	Pan-STARRS 1	RAF	850 m	MPC · JPL
698245	2017 VY_{24}	—	February 6, 2014	Mount Lemmon	Mount Lemmon Survey	·	1.3 km	MPC · JPL
698246	2017 VJ_{26}	—	May 1, 2006	Mauna Kea	P. A. Wiegert	·	1.1 km	MPC · JPL
698247	2017 VJ_{29}	—	October 4, 2004	Kitt Peak	Spacewatch	·	1.1 km	MPC · JPL
698248	2017 VM_{30}	—	April 20, 2015	Haleakala	Pan-STARRS 1	·	1.2 km	MPC · JPL
698249	2017 VP_{30}	—	January 28, 2015	Haleakala	Pan-STARRS 1	·	1.4 km	MPC · JPL
698250	2017 VY_{31}	—	July 18, 2007	Mount Lemmon	Mount Lemmon Survey	·	540 m	MPC · JPL
698251	2017 VN_{37}	—	November 14, 2017	Mount Lemmon	Mount Lemmon Survey	EUN	980 m	MPC · JPL
698252	2017 VT_{37}	—	November 15, 2017	Mount Lemmon	Mount Lemmon Survey	·	1.3 km	MPC · JPL
698253	2017 VO_{40}	—	April 19, 2015	Cerro Tololo	DECam	·	1.2 km	MPC · JPL
698254	2017 VX_{40}	—	November 15, 2017	Mount Lemmon	Mount Lemmon Survey	AGN	930 m	MPC · JPL
698255	2017 VJ_{41}	—	November 15, 2017	Mount Lemmon	Mount Lemmon Survey	·	1.6 km	MPC · JPL
698256	2017 VQ_{41}	—	April 18, 2015	Cerro Tololo	DECam	(12739)	1.1 km	MPC · JPL
698257	2017 VH_{42}	—	November 14, 2017	Mount Lemmon	Mount Lemmon Survey	·	1.2 km	MPC · JPL
698258	2017 VL_{42}	—	April 14, 2015	Mount Lemmon	Mount Lemmon Survey	·	1.2 km	MPC · JPL
698259	2017 VP_{42}	—	November 13, 2017	Haleakala	Pan-STARRS 1	·	1.4 km	MPC · JPL
698260	2017 VP_{43}	—	November 15, 2017	Mount Lemmon	Mount Lemmon Survey	·	1.0 km	MPC · JPL
698261	2017 VS_{43}	—	November 10, 2017	Haleakala	Pan-STARRS 1	·	990 m	MPC · JPL
698262	2017 VR_{44}	—	November 13, 2017	Haleakala	Pan-STARRS 1	·	1.2 km	MPC · JPL
698263	2017 VX_{51}	—	November 13, 2017	Haleakala	Pan-STARRS 1	EUN	980 m	MPC · JPL
698264	2017 VB_{54}	—	November 24, 2003	Anderson Mesa	LONEOS	·	2.0 km	MPC · JPL
698265	2017 VW_{57}	—	April 23, 2015	Haleakala	Pan-STARRS 1	KOR	970 m	MPC · JPL
698266	2017 WL	—	October 22, 2017	Mount Lemmon	Mount Lemmon Survey	H	340 m	MPC · JPL
698267	2017 WZ_{1}	—	October 27, 2017	Mount Lemmon	Mount Lemmon Survey	H	420 m	MPC · JPL
698268	2017 WC_{2}	—	November 19, 2017	Haleakala	Pan-STARRS 1	H	360 m	MPC · JPL
698269	2017 WH_{7}	—	October 30, 2017	Haleakala	Pan-STARRS 1	EOS	1.2 km	MPC · JPL
698270	2017 WR_{7}	—	November 30, 2008	Kitt Peak	Spacewatch	·	1.4 km	MPC · JPL
698271	2017 WV_{17}	—	September 5, 2010	La Sagra	OAM	·	630 m	MPC · JPL
698272	2017 WY_{17}	—	November 3, 2008	Mount Lemmon	Mount Lemmon Survey	·	1.5 km	MPC · JPL
698273	2017 WC_{18}	—	January 28, 2015	Haleakala	Pan-STARRS 1	KRM	1.8 km	MPC · JPL
698274	2017 WY_{18}	—	September 19, 2012	Mount Lemmon	Mount Lemmon Survey	AGN	950 m	MPC · JPL
698275	2017 WR_{20}	—	October 30, 2017	Haleakala	Pan-STARRS 1	·	1.1 km	MPC · JPL
698276	2017 WV_{24}	—	April 27, 2016	Haleakala	Pan-STARRS 1	H	440 m	MPC · JPL
698277	2017 WP_{26}	—	February 4, 2006	Kitt Peak	Spacewatch	·	1.2 km	MPC · JPL
698278	2017 WL_{29}	—	October 20, 2003	Kitt Peak	Spacewatch	·	1.8 km	MPC · JPL
698279	2017 WZ_{29}	—	September 12, 2004	Kitt Peak	Spacewatch	·	1.0 km	MPC · JPL
698280	2017 WF_{32}	—	November 22, 2017	Haleakala	Pan-STARRS 1	·	2.0 km	MPC · JPL
698281	2017 WC_{36}	—	November 28, 2017	Mount Lemmon	Mount Lemmon Survey	H	450 m	MPC · JPL
698282	2017 WO_{39}	—	November 25, 2017	Mount Lemmon	Mount Lemmon Survey	EUN	900 m	MPC · JPL
698283	2017 WP_{40}	—	November 24, 2017	Haleakala	Pan-STARRS 1	·	1.4 km	MPC · JPL
698284	2017 WY_{41}	—	October 16, 2012	Mount Lemmon	Mount Lemmon Survey	AGN	1.0 km	MPC · JPL
698285	2017 WA_{44}	—	November 21, 2017	Haleakala	Pan-STARRS 1	·	1.2 km	MPC · JPL
698286	2017 WV_{44}	—	November 21, 2017	Mount Lemmon	Mount Lemmon Survey	·	1.0 km	MPC · JPL
698287	2017 WY_{44}	—	November 26, 2017	Mount Lemmon	Mount Lemmon Survey	(5)	1.2 km	MPC · JPL
698288	2017 WO_{45}	—	November 17, 2017	Mount Lemmon	Mount Lemmon Survey	·	1.2 km	MPC · JPL
698289	2017 WR_{45}	—	November 18, 2017	Haleakala	Pan-STARRS 1	·	1.5 km	MPC · JPL
698290	2017 WD_{46}	—	April 20, 2015	Haleakala	Pan-STARRS 1	·	1.2 km	MPC · JPL
698291	2017 WE_{46}	—	April 18, 2015	Cerro Tololo	DECam	·	1.3 km	MPC · JPL
698292	2017 WJ_{46}	—	May 20, 2015	Cerro Tololo	DECam	·	1.2 km	MPC · JPL
698293	2017 WU_{46}	—	October 9, 2012	Mount Lemmon	Mount Lemmon Survey	·	1.4 km	MPC · JPL
698294	2017 WR_{49}	—	November 16, 2017	Mount Lemmon	Mount Lemmon Survey	·	1.2 km	MPC · JPL
698295	2017 WP_{51}	—	November 23, 2017	Mount Lemmon	Mount Lemmon Survey	EUN	850 m	MPC · JPL
698296	2017 WQ_{51}	—	November 16, 2017	Mount Lemmon	Mount Lemmon Survey	·	1.8 km	MPC · JPL
698297	2017 WS_{51}	—	April 18, 2015	Cerro Tololo	DECam	·	1.3 km	MPC · JPL
698298	2017 WH_{53}	—	November 26, 2017	Mount Lemmon	Mount Lemmon Survey	·	1.3 km	MPC · JPL
698299	2017 WY_{53}	—	November 18, 2017	Haleakala	Pan-STARRS 1	·	1.5 km	MPC · JPL
698300	2017 WO_{59}	—	November 22, 2017	Haleakala	Pan-STARRS 1	·	2.5 km	MPC · JPL

== 698301–698400 ==
back to top

Designation			Discovery			Properties		Ref
Permanent	Provisional	Named after	Date	Site	Discoverer(s)	Category	Diam.	Ref
698301	2017 WR_{60}	—	November 21, 2017	Haleakala	Pan-STARRS 1	KOR	1.0 km	MPC · JPL
698302	2017 WC_{62}	—	November 16, 2017	Mount Lemmon	Mount Lemmon Survey	·	1.5 km	MPC · JPL
698303	2017 WL_{63}	—	April 28, 2014	Cerro Tololo	DECam	·	2.6 km	MPC · JPL
698304	2017 WQ_{64}	—	November 21, 2017	Mount Lemmon	Mount Lemmon Survey	EUN	920 m	MPC · JPL
698305	2017 WK_{67}	—	March 21, 2015	Haleakala	Pan-STARRS 1	·	1.5 km	MPC · JPL
698306	2017 WS_{67}	—	November 15, 2017	Mount Lemmon	Mount Lemmon Survey	·	1.2 km	MPC · JPL
698307	2017 WD_{68}	—	November 21, 2017	Mount Lemmon	Mount Lemmon Survey	·	1.4 km	MPC · JPL
698308	2017 WQ_{70}	—	July 3, 2016	Mount Lemmon	Mount Lemmon Survey	·	1.2 km	MPC · JPL
698309	2017 WQ_{71}	—	November 21, 2017	Mount Lemmon	Mount Lemmon Survey	·	1.2 km	MPC · JPL
698310	2017 WW_{76}	—	October 8, 2016	Haleakala	Pan-STARRS 1	·	2.5 km	MPC · JPL
698311	2017 WE_{80}	—	May 20, 2015	Cerro Tololo	DECam	KOR	920 m	MPC · JPL
698312	2017 WU_{85}	—	April 18, 2015	Cerro Tololo	DECam	·	1.2 km	MPC · JPL
698313	2017 XA_{3}	—	November 12, 2005	Kitt Peak	Spacewatch	·	1.6 km	MPC · JPL
698314	2017 XO_{3}	—	May 10, 2007	Kitt Peak	Spacewatch	·	1.3 km	MPC · JPL
698315	2017 XP_{3}	—	October 21, 2017	Haleakala	Pan-STARRS 1	·	1.4 km	MPC · JPL
698316	2017 XE_{4}	—	January 10, 2008	Mount Lemmon	Mount Lemmon Survey	·	1.9 km	MPC · JPL
698317	2017 XP_{6}	—	October 27, 2017	Mount Lemmon	Mount Lemmon Survey	·	720 m	MPC · JPL
698318	2017 XM_{8}	—	August 1, 2016	Haleakala	Pan-STARRS 1	HOF	1.9 km	MPC · JPL
698319	2017 XX_{9}	—	September 12, 2012	Charleston	R. Holmes	·	1.3 km	MPC · JPL
698320	2017 XR_{12}	—	January 23, 2014	Mount Lemmon	Mount Lemmon Survey	·	1.2 km	MPC · JPL
698321	2017 XZ_{12}	—	September 26, 2012	Mount Lemmon	Mount Lemmon Survey	·	1.6 km	MPC · JPL
698322	2017 XF_{15}	—	November 28, 2013	Mount Lemmon	Mount Lemmon Survey	·	1.1 km	MPC · JPL
698323	2017 XZ_{15}	—	October 21, 2017	Haleakala	Pan-STARRS 1	·	1.3 km	MPC · JPL
698324	2017 XK_{16}	—	April 23, 2015	Haleakala	Pan-STARRS 1	·	1.3 km	MPC · JPL
698325	2017 XR_{17}	—	October 27, 2017	Mount Lemmon	Mount Lemmon Survey	(5)	1.0 km	MPC · JPL
698326	2017 XE_{18}	—	August 2, 2016	Haleakala	Pan-STARRS 1	BRA	1.1 km	MPC · JPL
698327	2017 XC_{25}	—	August 29, 2016	Mount Lemmon	Mount Lemmon Survey	·	1.6 km	MPC · JPL
698328	2017 XF_{26}	—	December 8, 2012	Mount Lemmon	Mount Lemmon Survey	·	1.2 km	MPC · JPL
698329	2017 XH_{26}	—	May 12, 2012	Mount Lemmon	Mount Lemmon Survey	·	890 m	MPC · JPL
698330	2017 XL_{27}	—	November 10, 2009	Kitt Peak	Spacewatch	·	680 m	MPC · JPL
698331	2017 XL_{34}	—	January 24, 2014	Haleakala	Pan-STARRS 1	HOF	1.9 km	MPC · JPL
698332	2017 XJ_{36}	—	October 30, 2017	Haleakala	Pan-STARRS 1	·	1.3 km	MPC · JPL
698333	2017 XY_{37}	—	July 11, 2016	Haleakala	Pan-STARRS 1	·	1.5 km	MPC · JPL
698334	2017 XJ_{44}	—	July 5, 2016	Haleakala	Pan-STARRS 1	·	1.3 km	MPC · JPL
698335	2017 XG_{45}	—	February 25, 2006	Kitt Peak	Spacewatch	·	1.2 km	MPC · JPL
698336	2017 XN_{46}	—	November 15, 2017	Mount Lemmon	Mount Lemmon Survey	(5)	970 m	MPC · JPL
698337	2017 XV_{48}	—	April 19, 2007	Mount Lemmon	Mount Lemmon Survey	·	1.1 km	MPC · JPL
698338	2017 XH_{49}	—	April 19, 2015	Mount Lemmon	Mount Lemmon Survey	·	1.1 km	MPC · JPL
698339	2017 XH_{50}	—	November 18, 2008	Kitt Peak	Spacewatch	·	1.7 km	MPC · JPL
698340	2017 XZ_{50}	—	November 14, 2017	Mount Lemmon	Mount Lemmon Survey	·	1.4 km	MPC · JPL
698341	2017 XE_{52}	—	October 11, 2012	Haleakala	Pan-STARRS 1	HOF	2.0 km	MPC · JPL
698342	2017 XG_{54}	—	December 31, 2013	Mount Lemmon	Mount Lemmon Survey	·	1.4 km	MPC · JPL
698343	2017 XP_{54}	—	October 6, 2008	Mount Lemmon	Mount Lemmon Survey	·	1.5 km	MPC · JPL
698344	2017 XZ_{54}	—	June 14, 2012	Mount Lemmon	Mount Lemmon Survey	·	1.2 km	MPC · JPL
698345	2017 XE_{55}	—	October 20, 2007	Kitt Peak	Spacewatch	KOR	1.0 km	MPC · JPL
698346	2017 XO_{55}	—	October 5, 2012	Mount Lemmon	Mount Lemmon Survey	·	1.4 km	MPC · JPL
698347	2017 XQ_{56}	—	October 30, 2017	Haleakala	Pan-STARRS 1	·	830 m	MPC · JPL
698348	2017 XG_{57}	—	October 17, 2012	Haleakala	Pan-STARRS 1	AGN	830 m	MPC · JPL
698349	2017 XQ_{57}	—	October 30, 2017	Haleakala	Pan-STARRS 1	·	940 m	MPC · JPL
698350	2017 XV_{57}	—	January 24, 2014	Haleakala	Pan-STARRS 1	·	1.8 km	MPC · JPL
698351	2017 XU_{62}	—	October 22, 2003	Apache Point	SDSS	·	2.2 km	MPC · JPL
698352	2017 XF_{64}	—	January 3, 2009	Mount Lemmon	Mount Lemmon Survey	GEF	1.1 km	MPC · JPL
698353	2017 XD_{68}	—	December 14, 2017	Mount Lemmon	Mount Lemmon Survey	WIT	730 m	MPC · JPL
698354	2017 XG_{71}	—	December 13, 2017	Haleakala	Pan-STARRS 1	·	2.2 km	MPC · JPL
698355	2017 XL_{71}	—	December 15, 2017	Mount Lemmon	Mount Lemmon Survey	LIX	2.6 km	MPC · JPL
698356	2017 XM_{72}	—	December 8, 2017	Haleakala	Pan-STARRS 1	·	1.4 km	MPC · JPL
698357	2017 XO_{72}	—	December 12, 2017	Haleakala	Pan-STARRS 1	·	1.9 km	MPC · JPL
698358	2017 XD_{73}	—	December 12, 2017	Haleakala	Pan-STARRS 1	V	620 m	MPC · JPL
698359	2017 XY_{74}	—	December 12, 2017	Haleakala	Pan-STARRS 1	EOS	1.3 km	MPC · JPL
698360	2017 XJ_{75}	—	December 14, 2017	Mount Lemmon	Mount Lemmon Survey	·	1.1 km	MPC · JPL
698361	2017 XL_{78}	—	December 2, 2008	Kitt Peak	Spacewatch	AGN	1.0 km	MPC · JPL
698362	2017 XN_{78}	—	August 13, 2012	Kitt Peak	Spacewatch	·	1.1 km	MPC · JPL
698363	2017 XR_{78}	—	December 9, 2017	Mount Lemmon	Mount Lemmon Survey	·	1.1 km	MPC · JPL
698364	2017 XN_{79}	—	November 21, 1995	Kitt Peak	Spacewatch	EUN	1.1 km	MPC · JPL
698365	2017 XP_{81}	—	December 15, 2017	Mount Lemmon	Mount Lemmon Survey	BRA	1.1 km	MPC · JPL
698366	2017 XT_{81}	—	December 15, 2017	Mount Lemmon	Mount Lemmon Survey	·	1.6 km	MPC · JPL
698367	2017 XP_{82}	—	December 10, 2017	Haleakala	Pan-STARRS 1	·	1.4 km	MPC · JPL
698368	2017 XE_{83}	—	December 12, 2017	Haleakala	Pan-STARRS 1	KOR	1.0 km	MPC · JPL
698369	2017 XF_{83}	—	December 12, 2017	Haleakala	Pan-STARRS 1	·	1.4 km	MPC · JPL
698370	2017 XZ_{89}	—	December 12, 2017	Haleakala	Pan-STARRS 1	·	1.6 km	MPC · JPL
698371	2017 XF_{94}	—	December 10, 2017	Haleakala	Pan-STARRS 1	EOS	1.5 km	MPC · JPL
698372 Zhangmi	2017 XT_{95}	Zhangmi	December 14, 2017	Xingming	Li, A., X. Gao	·	1.6 km	MPC · JPL
698373	2017 YP	—	June 6, 2016	Mount Lemmon	Mount Lemmon Survey	H	410 m	MPC · JPL
698374	2017 YS_{9}	—	December 7, 2013	Mount Lemmon	Mount Lemmon Survey	·	830 m	MPC · JPL
698375	2017 YT_{10}	—	December 20, 2017	Kitt Peak	Spacewatch	·	1.4 km	MPC · JPL
698376	2017 YX_{11}	—	June 4, 2014	Haleakala	Pan-STARRS 1	·	1.8 km	MPC · JPL
698377	2017 YP_{15}	—	December 31, 2008	Mount Lemmon	Mount Lemmon Survey	·	1.9 km	MPC · JPL
698378	2017 YJ_{17}	—	December 26, 2017	Mount Lemmon	Mount Lemmon Survey	·	2.0 km	MPC · JPL
698379	2017 YH_{19}	—	April 28, 2014	Cerro Tololo	DECam	·	1.7 km	MPC · JPL
698380	2017 YW_{19}	—	January 17, 2007	Kitt Peak	Spacewatch	·	1.9 km	MPC · JPL
698381	2017 YN_{20}	—	April 18, 2015	Cerro Tololo	DECam	EUN	880 m	MPC · JPL
698382	2017 YY_{21}	—	October 8, 2016	Mount Lemmon	Mount Lemmon Survey	EOS	1.2 km	MPC · JPL
698383	2017 YF_{23}	—	December 23, 2017	Haleakala	Pan-STARRS 1	·	2.2 km	MPC · JPL
698384	2017 YW_{23}	—	December 22, 2017	Haleakala	Pan-STARRS 1	·	2.0 km	MPC · JPL
698385	2017 YF_{24}	—	December 23, 2017	Haleakala	Pan-STARRS 1	·	2.4 km	MPC · JPL
698386	2017 YP_{24}	—	December 26, 2017	Mount Lemmon	Mount Lemmon Survey	·	1.6 km	MPC · JPL
698387	2017 YO_{26}	—	December 23, 2017	Haleakala	Pan-STARRS 1	EOS	1.2 km	MPC · JPL
698388	2017 YP_{27}	—	December 23, 2017	Haleakala	Pan-STARRS 1	EOS	1.2 km	MPC · JPL
698389	2017 YD_{28}	—	December 28, 2017	Haleakala	Pan-STARRS 1	·	2.7 km	MPC · JPL
698390	2017 YZ_{29}	—	December 4, 2012	Mount Lemmon	Mount Lemmon Survey	WIT	790 m	MPC · JPL
698391	2017 YG_{30}	—	April 23, 2014	Cerro Tololo	DECam	·	1.7 km	MPC · JPL
698392	2017 YR_{30}	—	December 23, 2017	Haleakala	Pan-STARRS 1	KOR	1.0 km	MPC · JPL
698393	2017 YS_{33}	—	December 29, 2017	Haleakala	Pan-STARRS 1	EOS	1.4 km	MPC · JPL
698394	2017 YU_{33}	—	December 23, 2017	Haleakala	Pan-STARRS 1	KOR	1.1 km	MPC · JPL
698395	2017 YV_{33}	—	December 23, 2017	Haleakala	Pan-STARRS 1	·	1.5 km	MPC · JPL
698396	2017 YG_{37}	—	November 7, 2012	Haleakala	Pan-STARRS 1	·	1.3 km	MPC · JPL
698397	2017 YC_{38}	—	December 23, 2017	Haleakala	Pan-STARRS 1	·	2.1 km	MPC · JPL
698398	2017 YM_{39}	—	December 25, 2017	Haleakala	Pan-STARRS 1	H	410 m	MPC · JPL
698399	2017 YB_{40}	—	December 23, 2017	Haleakala	Pan-STARRS 1	·	1.5 km	MPC · JPL
698400	2017 YJ_{41}	—	December 23, 2017	Haleakala	Pan-STARRS 1	·	1.6 km	MPC · JPL

== 698401–698500 ==
back to top

Designation			Discovery			Properties		Ref
Permanent	Provisional	Named after	Date	Site	Discoverer(s)	Category	Diam.	Ref
698401	2017 YO_{41}	—	December 25, 2017	Haleakala	Pan-STARRS 1	TRE	1.9 km	MPC · JPL
698402	2017 YQ_{41}	—	April 28, 2014	Cerro Tololo	DECam	·	1.5 km	MPC · JPL
698403	2017 YY_{41}	—	May 6, 2014	Haleakala	Pan-STARRS 1	EOS	1.4 km	MPC · JPL
698404	2017 YA_{42}	—	December 22, 2017	Haleakala	Pan-STARRS 1	BRA	930 m	MPC · JPL
698405	2017 YJ_{42}	—	December 28, 2017	Haleakala	Pan-STARRS 1	·	2.7 km	MPC · JPL
698406	2017 YC_{43}	—	December 24, 2017	Haleakala	Pan-STARRS 1	·	2.0 km	MPC · JPL
698407	2017 YN_{43}	—	December 24, 2017	Haleakala	Pan-STARRS 1	·	2.3 km	MPC · JPL
698408	2017 YL_{45}	—	December 24, 2017	Haleakala	Pan-STARRS 1	·	2.1 km	MPC · JPL
698409	2017 YN_{45}	—	December 25, 2017	Haleakala	Pan-STARRS 1	EOS	1.5 km	MPC · JPL
698410	2017 YZ_{45}	—	December 28, 2017	Mount Lemmon	Mount Lemmon Survey	·	2.0 km	MPC · JPL
698411	2017 YR_{48}	—	December 23, 2017	Haleakala	Pan-STARRS 1	·	1.4 km	MPC · JPL
698412	2017 YS_{48}	—	December 23, 2017	Haleakala	Pan-STARRS 1	·	1.4 km	MPC · JPL
698413	2017 YR_{49}	—	December 23, 2017	Haleakala	Pan-STARRS 1	KOR	1.1 km	MPC · JPL
698414	2017 YK_{50}	—	December 23, 2017	Haleakala	Pan-STARRS 1	·	1.4 km	MPC · JPL
698415	2017 YW_{50}	—	December 26, 2017	Mount Lemmon	Mount Lemmon Survey	·	1.6 km	MPC · JPL
698416	2017 YZ_{51}	—	December 24, 2017	Haleakala	Pan-STARRS 1	·	1.2 km	MPC · JPL
698417	2017 YW_{70}	—	October 23, 2011	Haleakala	Pan-STARRS 1	·	2.2 km	MPC · JPL
698418	2018 AT_{4}	—	May 2, 2006	Kitt Peak	Spacewatch	·	1.8 km	MPC · JPL
698419	2018 AW_{4}	—	November 30, 2008	Mount Lemmon	Mount Lemmon Survey	·	2.3 km	MPC · JPL
698420	2018 AU_{5}	—	November 22, 2017	Haleakala	Pan-STARRS 1	·	2.4 km	MPC · JPL
698421	2018 AZ_{5}	—	August 26, 2012	Haleakala	Pan-STARRS 1	·	1.2 km	MPC · JPL
698422	2018 AT_{6}	—	January 3, 2009	Mount Lemmon	Mount Lemmon Survey	·	1.7 km	MPC · JPL
698423	2018 AB_{8}	—	January 10, 2018	Haleakala	Pan-STARRS 1	·	1.6 km	MPC · JPL
698424	2018 AL_{9}	—	July 22, 2011	Haleakala	Pan-STARRS 1	·	1.8 km	MPC · JPL
698425	2018 AC_{16}	—	October 28, 2008	Kitt Peak	Spacewatch	·	1.9 km	MPC · JPL
698426	2018 AD_{16}	—	October 20, 2011	Mount Lemmon	Mount Lemmon Survey	·	1.9 km	MPC · JPL
698427	2018 AP_{16}	—	September 10, 2007	Mount Lemmon	Mount Lemmon Survey	·	1.3 km	MPC · JPL
698428	2018 AQ_{16}	—	April 1, 2014	Mount Lemmon	Mount Lemmon Survey	·	1.5 km	MPC · JPL
698429	2018 AP_{17}	—	January 15, 2018	Haleakala	Pan-STARRS 1	·	2.1 km	MPC · JPL
698430	2018 AU_{19}	—	January 12, 2018	Mount Lemmon	Mount Lemmon Survey	·	2.3 km	MPC · JPL
698431	2018 AG_{20}	—	December 27, 2006	Mount Lemmon	Mount Lemmon Survey	·	2.2 km	MPC · JPL
698432	2018 AK_{20}	—	December 24, 2006	Kitt Peak	Spacewatch	HYG	2.1 km	MPC · JPL
698433	2018 AW_{22}	—	January 15, 2018	Haleakala	Pan-STARRS 1	·	2.1 km	MPC · JPL
698434	2018 AZ_{22}	—	January 15, 2018	Haleakala	Pan-STARRS 1	EOS	1.3 km	MPC · JPL
698435	2018 AP_{23}	—	June 23, 2009	Mount Lemmon	Mount Lemmon Survey	·	2.3 km	MPC · JPL
698436	2018 AG_{24}	—	January 10, 2018	Haleakala	Pan-STARRS 1	·	2.0 km	MPC · JPL
698437	2018 AT_{24}	—	September 21, 2012	Mount Lemmon	Mount Lemmon Survey	·	870 m	MPC · JPL
698438	2018 AY_{26}	—	January 13, 2018	Mount Lemmon	Mount Lemmon Survey	·	1.5 km	MPC · JPL
698439	2018 AG_{27}	—	January 12, 2018	Haleakala	Pan-STARRS 1	·	1.9 km	MPC · JPL
698440	2018 AN_{27}	—	April 28, 2014	Cerro Tololo	DECam	EOS	1.2 km	MPC · JPL
698441	2018 AO_{27}	—	January 14, 2018	Mount Lemmon	Mount Lemmon Survey	·	1.4 km	MPC · JPL
698442	2018 AS_{27}	—	January 12, 2018	Haleakala	Pan-STARRS 1	·	1.6 km	MPC · JPL
698443	2018 AT_{27}	—	January 11, 2018	Haleakala	Pan-STARRS 1	EOS	1.6 km	MPC · JPL
698444	2018 AC_{29}	—	January 10, 2018	Haleakala	Pan-STARRS 1	EOS	1.1 km	MPC · JPL
698445	2018 AH_{29}	—	January 12, 2018	Mount Lemmon	Mount Lemmon Survey	·	2.2 km	MPC · JPL
698446	2018 AO_{29}	—	January 11, 2018	Haleakala	Pan-STARRS 1	·	2.3 km	MPC · JPL
698447	2018 AV_{29}	—	January 13, 2018	Mount Lemmon	Mount Lemmon Survey	·	3.0 km	MPC · JPL
698448	2018 AZ_{29}	—	January 14, 2018	Haleakala	Pan-STARRS 1	·	1.8 km	MPC · JPL
698449	2018 AC_{30}	—	June 2, 2014	Haleakala	Pan-STARRS 1	·	1.5 km	MPC · JPL
698450	2018 AJ_{30}	—	January 14, 2018	Mount Lemmon	Mount Lemmon Survey	·	1.6 km	MPC · JPL
698451	2018 AM_{30}	—	January 12, 2018	Mount Lemmon	Mount Lemmon Survey	·	1.2 km	MPC · JPL
698452	2018 AS_{32}	—	January 15, 2018	Haleakala	Pan-STARRS 1	·	2.1 km	MPC · JPL
698453	2018 AC_{33}	—	January 14, 2018	Haleakala	Pan-STARRS 1	·	1.4 km	MPC · JPL
698454	2018 AD_{33}	—	January 15, 2018	Haleakala	Pan-STARRS 1	·	2.1 km	MPC · JPL
698455	2018 AJ_{33}	—	January 14, 2018	Haleakala	Pan-STARRS 1	EOS	1.7 km	MPC · JPL
698456	2018 AL_{33}	—	January 15, 2018	Haleakala	Pan-STARRS 1	VER	1.9 km	MPC · JPL
698457	2018 AL_{35}	—	January 12, 2018	Mount Lemmon	Mount Lemmon Survey	MAR	740 m	MPC · JPL
698458	2018 AS_{36}	—	January 13, 2018	Mount Lemmon	Mount Lemmon Survey	·	1.4 km	MPC · JPL
698459	2018 AF_{41}	—	January 15, 2018	Haleakala	Pan-STARRS 1	·	1.3 km	MPC · JPL
698460	2018 AF_{42}	—	January 15, 2018	Haleakala	Pan-STARRS 1	·	2.0 km	MPC · JPL
698461	2018 AG_{42}	—	January 13, 2018	Mount Lemmon	Mount Lemmon Survey	LIX	2.6 km	MPC · JPL
698462	2018 AK_{42}	—	January 15, 2018	Haleakala	Pan-STARRS 1	·	1.8 km	MPC · JPL
698463	2018 AR_{42}	—	December 23, 2017	Haleakala	Pan-STARRS 1	·	1.9 km	MPC · JPL
698464	2018 AT_{43}	—	January 12, 2018	Mount Lemmon	Mount Lemmon Survey	·	1.8 km	MPC · JPL
698465	2018 AV_{43}	—	January 9, 2018	Mount Lemmon	Mount Lemmon Survey	H	480 m	MPC · JPL
698466	2018 AN_{44}	—	July 25, 2015	Haleakala	Pan-STARRS 1	·	2.1 km	MPC · JPL
698467	2018 AS_{44}	—	January 15, 2018	Haleakala	Pan-STARRS 1	·	2.0 km	MPC · JPL
698468	2018 AQ_{45}	—	January 15, 2018	Haleakala	Pan-STARRS 1	EOS	1.3 km	MPC · JPL
698469	2018 AC_{46}	—	January 15, 2018	Haleakala	Pan-STARRS 1	·	2.2 km	MPC · JPL
698470	2018 AL_{46}	—	January 15, 2018	Haleakala	Pan-STARRS 1	·	1.2 km	MPC · JPL
698471	2018 AB_{47}	—	March 6, 2013	Haleakala	Pan-STARRS 1	·	2.4 km	MPC · JPL
698472	2018 AD_{47}	—	March 24, 2014	Haleakala	Pan-STARRS 1	·	1.5 km	MPC · JPL
698473	2018 AJ_{47}	—	January 10, 2018	Haleakala	Pan-STARRS 1	EOS	1.1 km	MPC · JPL
698474	2018 AV_{48}	—	May 5, 2014	Cerro Tololo	DECam	EOS	1.2 km	MPC · JPL
698475	2018 AW_{48}	—	January 12, 2018	Haleakala	Pan-STARRS 1	·	1.9 km	MPC · JPL
698476	2018 AJ_{49}	—	January 14, 2018	Mount Lemmon	Mount Lemmon Survey	EOS	1.5 km	MPC · JPL
698477	2018 AC_{50}	—	October 7, 2007	Mount Lemmon	Mount Lemmon Survey	AGN	850 m	MPC · JPL
698478	2018 AD_{50}	—	January 15, 2018	Haleakala	Pan-STARRS 1	·	2.1 km	MPC · JPL
698479	2018 AH_{50}	—	April 23, 2014	Cerro Tololo	DECam	EOS	1.4 km	MPC · JPL
698480	2018 AM_{51}	—	January 14, 2018	Haleakala	Pan-STARRS 1	·	1.5 km	MPC · JPL
698481	2018 AQ_{51}	—	January 10, 2018	Haleakala	Pan-STARRS 1	BRA	1.2 km	MPC · JPL
698482	2018 AU_{51}	—	January 12, 2018	Haleakala	Pan-STARRS 1	·	1.2 km	MPC · JPL
698483	2018 AA_{52}	—	January 15, 2018	Haleakala	Pan-STARRS 1	·	1.4 km	MPC · JPL
698484	2018 AK_{52}	—	January 12, 2018	Haleakala	Pan-STARRS 1	·	1.4 km	MPC · JPL
698485	2018 AC_{53}	—	April 23, 2014	Cerro Tololo	DECam	KOR	1 km	MPC · JPL
698486	2018 AO_{54}	—	January 15, 2018	Haleakala	Pan-STARRS 1	·	1.8 km	MPC · JPL
698487	2018 AB_{55}	—	January 14, 2018	Haleakala	Pan-STARRS 1	EOS	1.2 km	MPC · JPL
698488	2018 AM_{55}	—	May 8, 2014	Haleakala	Pan-STARRS 1	·	1.1 km	MPC · JPL
698489	2018 AO_{55}	—	May 23, 2014	Haleakala	Pan-STARRS 1	·	1.5 km	MPC · JPL
698490	2018 AX_{57}	—	January 11, 2018	Haleakala	Pan-STARRS 1	·	1.4 km	MPC · JPL
698491	2018 AM_{58}	—	January 15, 2018	Mount Lemmon	Mount Lemmon Survey	·	2.4 km	MPC · JPL
698492	2018 AB_{61}	—	January 11, 2018	Haleakala	Pan-STARRS 1	·	1.4 km	MPC · JPL
698493	2018 AQ_{61}	—	January 15, 2018	Mount Lemmon	Mount Lemmon Survey	VER	2.1 km	MPC · JPL
698494	2018 AS_{62}	—	January 18, 2008	Kitt Peak	Spacewatch	·	1.4 km	MPC · JPL
698495	2018 AV_{62}	—	January 14, 2018	Haleakala	Pan-STARRS 1	·	2.2 km	MPC · JPL
698496	2018 AE_{63}	—	January 12, 2018	Haleakala	Pan-STARRS 1	EOS	1.3 km	MPC · JPL
698497	2018 AF_{63}	—	January 12, 2018	Haleakala	Pan-STARRS 1	EOS	1.3 km	MPC · JPL
698498	2018 AW_{63}	—	August 21, 2015	Haleakala	Pan-STARRS 1	·	2.0 km	MPC · JPL
698499	2018 AH_{66}	—	January 12, 2018	Haleakala	Pan-STARRS 1	TEL	990 m	MPC · JPL
698500	2018 AM_{68}	—	January 10, 2018	Haleakala	Pan-STARRS 1	·	1.9 km	MPC · JPL

== 698501–698600 ==
back to top

Designation			Discovery			Properties		Ref
Permanent	Provisional	Named after	Date	Site	Discoverer(s)	Category	Diam.	Ref
698501	2018 AM_{70}	—	January 12, 2018	Mount Lemmon	Mount Lemmon Survey	·	1.9 km	MPC · JPL
698502	2018 AG_{76}	—	May 20, 2014	Haleakala	Pan-STARRS 1	EOS	1.2 km	MPC · JPL
698503	2018 AR_{80}	—	January 13, 2018	Mount Lemmon	Mount Lemmon Survey	·	1.8 km	MPC · JPL
698504	2018 BB_{2}	—	October 2, 2003	Kitt Peak	Spacewatch	·	1.6 km	MPC · JPL
698505	2018 BW_{4}	—	December 23, 2017	Haleakala	Pan-STARRS 1	H	350 m	MPC · JPL
698506	2018 BO_{7}	—	November 4, 2012	Mount Lemmon	Mount Lemmon Survey	·	1.4 km	MPC · JPL
698507	2018 BF_{8}	—	October 28, 2005	Kitt Peak	Spacewatch	·	1.0 km	MPC · JPL
698508	2018 BT_{13}	—	February 21, 2007	Mount Lemmon	Mount Lemmon Survey	·	2.2 km	MPC · JPL
698509	2018 BA_{14}	—	January 16, 2018	Haleakala	Pan-STARRS 1	H	440 m	MPC · JPL
698510	2018 BV_{14}	—	January 16, 2018	Haleakala	Pan-STARRS 1	·	1.9 km	MPC · JPL
698511	2018 BD_{15}	—	January 23, 2018	Mount Lemmon	Mount Lemmon Survey	EOS	1.3 km	MPC · JPL
698512	2018 BE_{15}	—	January 16, 2018	Haleakala	Pan-STARRS 1	·	1.9 km	MPC · JPL
698513	2018 BF_{15}	—	January 27, 2018	Mount Lemmon	Mount Lemmon Survey	·	2.7 km	MPC · JPL
698514	2018 BJ_{15}	—	January 20, 2018	Haleakala	Pan-STARRS 1	·	1.7 km	MPC · JPL
698515	2018 BD_{17}	—	January 20, 2018	Haleakala	Pan-STARRS 1	·	2.0 km	MPC · JPL
698516	2018 BP_{17}	—	January 20, 2018	Haleakala	Pan-STARRS 1	·	1.4 km	MPC · JPL
698517	2018 BD_{18}	—	January 20, 2018	Haleakala	Pan-STARRS 1	·	2.4 km	MPC · JPL
698518	2018 BN_{18}	—	April 21, 2014	Mount Lemmon	Mount Lemmon Survey	KOR	1.0 km	MPC · JPL
698519	2018 BW_{18}	—	January 20, 2018	Haleakala	Pan-STARRS 1	·	2.5 km	MPC · JPL
698520	2018 BZ_{18}	—	January 16, 2018	Haleakala	Pan-STARRS 1	·	2.5 km	MPC · JPL
698521	2018 BH_{19}	—	January 20, 2018	Haleakala	Pan-STARRS 1	·	2.4 km	MPC · JPL
698522	2018 BN_{19}	—	February 16, 2013	Kitt Peak	Spacewatch	EOS	1.5 km	MPC · JPL
698523	2018 BW_{19}	—	January 20, 2018	Haleakala	Pan-STARRS 1	·	2.2 km	MPC · JPL
698524	2018 BY_{19}	—	January 16, 2018	Haleakala	Pan-STARRS 1	·	1.7 km	MPC · JPL
698525	2018 BB_{20}	—	January 20, 2018	Haleakala	Pan-STARRS 1	·	1.3 km	MPC · JPL
698526	2018 BC_{20}	—	January 20, 2018	Haleakala	Pan-STARRS 1	EOS	1.5 km	MPC · JPL
698527	2018 BE_{20}	—	January 16, 2018	Haleakala	Pan-STARRS 1	AGN	920 m	MPC · JPL
698528	2018 BM_{20}	—	January 16, 2018	Haleakala	Pan-STARRS 1	·	1.2 km	MPC · JPL
698529	2018 BQ_{20}	—	January 16, 2018	Haleakala	Pan-STARRS 1	·	1.7 km	MPC · JPL
698530	2018 BU_{20}	—	January 20, 2018	Haleakala	Pan-STARRS 1	EOS	1.4 km	MPC · JPL
698531	2018 BC_{22}	—	January 23, 2018	Mount Lemmon	Mount Lemmon Survey	·	1.7 km	MPC · JPL
698532	2018 BZ_{22}	—	January 16, 2018	Haleakala	Pan-STARRS 1	KOR	1.0 km	MPC · JPL
698533	2018 BS_{23}	—	January 24, 2018	Mount Lemmon	Mount Lemmon Survey	·	3.8 km	MPC · JPL
698534	2018 BK_{24}	—	January 27, 2018	Mount Lemmon	Mount Lemmon Survey	H	480 m	MPC · JPL
698535	2018 BS_{24}	—	January 16, 2018	Haleakala	Pan-STARRS 1	·	2.0 km	MPC · JPL
698536	2018 BF_{25}	—	January 17, 2018	Haleakala	Pan-STARRS 1	·	2.1 km	MPC · JPL
698537	2018 BJ_{25}	—	April 28, 2014	Cerro Tololo	DECam	·	1.5 km	MPC · JPL
698538	2018 BT_{25}	—	May 8, 2014	Haleakala	Pan-STARRS 1	·	1.2 km	MPC · JPL
698539	2018 BM_{26}	—	January 16, 2018	Haleakala	Pan-STARRS 1	·	1.9 km	MPC · JPL
698540	2018 BE_{27}	—	October 6, 2005	Mount Lemmon	Mount Lemmon Survey	·	2.1 km	MPC · JPL
698541	2018 BL_{30}	—	January 20, 2018	Haleakala	Pan-STARRS 1	·	1.6 km	MPC · JPL
698542	2018 BQ_{30}	—	January 20, 2018	Haleakala	Pan-STARRS 1	EOS	1.5 km	MPC · JPL
698543	2018 BB_{31}	—	January 20, 2018	Mount Lemmon	Mount Lemmon Survey	BRA	1.1 km	MPC · JPL
698544	2018 BC_{31}	—	January 16, 2018	Haleakala	Pan-STARRS 1	·	1.5 km	MPC · JPL
698545	2018 BG_{31}	—	January 16, 2018	Haleakala	Pan-STARRS 1	·	1.4 km	MPC · JPL
698546	2018 BK_{31}	—	January 20, 2018	Haleakala	Pan-STARRS 1	·	2.1 km	MPC · JPL
698547	2018 BP_{31}	—	January 16, 2018	Haleakala	Pan-STARRS 1	·	1.5 km	MPC · JPL
698548	2018 BA_{32}	—	January 16, 2018	Haleakala	Pan-STARRS 1	·	1.5 km	MPC · JPL
698549	2018 BD_{32}	—	January 20, 2018	Haleakala	Pan-STARRS 1	HYG	1.8 km	MPC · JPL
698550	2018 BE_{32}	—	January 16, 2018	Haleakala	Pan-STARRS 1	·	1.6 km	MPC · JPL
698551	2018 BJ_{32}	—	July 26, 2015	Haleakala	Pan-STARRS 1	·	2.0 km	MPC · JPL
698552	2018 BT_{35}	—	January 16, 2018	Haleakala	Pan-STARRS 1	·	2.1 km	MPC · JPL
698553	2018 BU_{40}	—	March 14, 2013	Palomar	Palomar Transient Factory	TIR	2.2 km	MPC · JPL
698554	2018 BU_{42}	—	January 23, 2018	Mount Lemmon	Mount Lemmon Survey	·	1.2 km	MPC · JPL
698555	2018 BE_{44}	—	January 20, 2018	Haleakala	Pan-STARRS 1	·	2.3 km	MPC · JPL
698556	2018 BZ_{53}	—	January 16, 2018	Haleakala	Pan-STARRS 1	·	1.9 km	MPC · JPL
698557	2018 CW_{3}	—	November 20, 2017	Haleakala	Pan-STARRS 1	·	2.5 km	MPC · JPL
698558	2018 CW_{4}	—	August 10, 2016	Haleakala	Pan-STARRS 1	·	1.8 km	MPC · JPL
698559	2018 CF_{6}	—	November 13, 2006	Kitt Peak	Spacewatch	·	1.9 km	MPC · JPL
698560	2018 CA_{7}	—	February 22, 2002	Palomar	NEAT	·	2.1 km	MPC · JPL
698561	2018 CX_{10}	—	December 4, 2005	Kitt Peak	Spacewatch	T_{j} (2.97)	3.6 km	MPC · JPL
698562	2018 CY_{12}	—	August 10, 2015	Haleakala	Pan-STARRS 1	·	2.0 km	MPC · JPL
698563	2018 CC_{13}	—	January 28, 2007	Mount Lemmon	Mount Lemmon Survey	·	2.7 km	MPC · JPL
698564	2018 CX_{16}	—	February 11, 2018	Haleakala	Pan-STARRS 1	·	2.2 km	MPC · JPL
698565	2018 CE_{18}	—	February 11, 2018	Haleakala	Pan-STARRS 1	(21885)	2.3 km	MPC · JPL
698566	2018 CG_{18}	—	February 12, 2018	Haleakala	Pan-STARRS 1	EOS	1.7 km	MPC · JPL
698567	2018 CW_{18}	—	February 10, 2018	Mount Lemmon	Mount Lemmon Survey	·	2.3 km	MPC · JPL
698568	2018 CX_{18}	—	February 11, 2018	Haleakala	Pan-STARRS 1	·	1.7 km	MPC · JPL
698569	2018 CY_{18}	—	February 5, 2018	Mount Lemmon	Mount Lemmon Survey	·	2.4 km	MPC · JPL
698570	2018 CF_{19}	—	February 12, 2018	Haleakala	Pan-STARRS 1	·	1.5 km	MPC · JPL
698571	2018 CM_{19}	—	February 12, 2018	Haleakala	Pan-STARRS 1	·	2.1 km	MPC · JPL
698572	2018 CD_{20}	—	February 11, 2018	Haleakala	Pan-STARRS 1	·	2.4 km	MPC · JPL
698573	2018 CZ_{20}	—	February 1, 2012	Kitt Peak	Spacewatch	·	2.3 km	MPC · JPL
698574	2018 CC_{21}	—	January 27, 2012	Mount Lemmon	Mount Lemmon Survey	LIX	3.2 km	MPC · JPL
698575	2018 CC_{22}	—	February 10, 2018	Haleakala	Pan-STARRS 1	PHO	710 m	MPC · JPL
698576	2018 CJ_{24}	—	February 12, 2018	Haleakala	Pan-STARRS 1	·	2.2 km	MPC · JPL
698577	2018 CN_{24}	—	February 12, 2018	Haleakala	Pan-STARRS 1	·	1.6 km	MPC · JPL
698578	2018 CP_{24}	—	February 12, 2018	Haleakala	Pan-STARRS 1	·	2.4 km	MPC · JPL
698579	2018 CC_{25}	—	February 11, 2018	Haleakala	Pan-STARRS 1	·	1.8 km	MPC · JPL
698580	2018 CP_{25}	—	January 16, 2018	Haleakala	Pan-STARRS 1	·	2.6 km	MPC · JPL
698581	2018 CY_{25}	—	February 12, 2018	Haleakala	Pan-STARRS 1	·	2.2 km	MPC · JPL
698582	2018 CO_{26}	—	February 11, 2018	Haleakala	Pan-STARRS 1	·	2.2 km	MPC · JPL
698583	2018 CT_{26}	—	February 12, 2018	Haleakala	Pan-STARRS 1	·	1.5 km	MPC · JPL
698584	2018 CU_{26}	—	May 9, 2007	Mount Lemmon	Mount Lemmon Survey	·	2.5 km	MPC · JPL
698585	2018 CW_{26}	—	April 14, 2008	Mount Lemmon	Mount Lemmon Survey	EOS	1.5 km	MPC · JPL
698586	2018 CH_{27}	—	February 10, 2018	Mount Lemmon	Mount Lemmon Survey	·	1.8 km	MPC · JPL
698587	2018 CX_{30}	—	February 12, 2018	Haleakala	Pan-STARRS 1	URS	2.4 km	MPC · JPL
698588	2018 CX_{32}	—	February 10, 2018	Mount Lemmon	Mount Lemmon Survey	·	1.6 km	MPC · JPL
698589	2018 DS_{6}	—	November 3, 2010	Mount Lemmon	Mount Lemmon Survey	·	2.1 km	MPC · JPL
698590	2018 DY_{6}	—	February 21, 2018	Haleakala	Pan-STARRS 1	EUP	3.0 km	MPC · JPL
698591	2018 DC_{7}	—	February 28, 2014	Haleakala	Pan-STARRS 1	·	1.4 km	MPC · JPL
698592	2018 DD_{7}	—	February 21, 2018	Haleakala	Pan-STARRS 1	EOS	1.4 km	MPC · JPL
698593	2018 DH_{7}	—	February 20, 2018	Haleakala	Pan-STARRS 1	URS	2.6 km	MPC · JPL
698594	2018 DT_{8}	—	March 21, 2012	Catalina	CSS	·	2.2 km	MPC · JPL
698595	2018 DH_{9}	—	February 17, 2018	Mount Lemmon	Mount Lemmon Survey	·	2.2 km	MPC · JPL
698596	2018 DX_{9}	—	February 25, 2018	Mount Lemmon	Mount Lemmon Survey	·	2.6 km	MPC · JPL
698597	2018 DB_{10}	—	February 17, 2018	Mount Lemmon	Mount Lemmon Survey	·	2.7 km	MPC · JPL
698598	2018 DL_{10}	—	July 25, 2015	Haleakala	Pan-STARRS 1	·	1.7 km	MPC · JPL
698599	2018 DY_{10}	—	November 3, 2016	Haleakala	Pan-STARRS 1	·	2.3 km	MPC · JPL
698600	2018 DE_{12}	—	February 27, 2018	Mount Lemmon	Mount Lemmon Survey	·	2.6 km	MPC · JPL

== 698601–698700 ==
back to top

Designation			Discovery			Properties		Ref
Permanent	Provisional	Named after	Date	Site	Discoverer(s)	Category	Diam.	Ref
698601	2018 DM_{12}	—	February 17, 2018	Mount Lemmon	Mount Lemmon Survey	·	1.9 km	MPC · JPL
698602	2018 DC_{13}	—	January 27, 2007	Mount Lemmon	Mount Lemmon Survey	·	1.9 km	MPC · JPL
698603	2018 ED_{3}	—	January 17, 2007	Kitt Peak	Spacewatch	·	1.6 km	MPC · JPL
698604	2018 EF_{11}	—	March 7, 2018	Haleakala	Pan-STARRS 1	·	2.4 km	MPC · JPL
698605	2018 EC_{12}	—	March 6, 2018	Haleakala	Pan-STARRS 1	EOS	1.3 km	MPC · JPL
698606	2018 EE_{12}	—	March 8, 2018	Haleakala	Pan-STARRS 1	·	1.7 km	MPC · JPL
698607	2018 EH_{13}	—	March 10, 2018	Haleakala	Pan-STARRS 1	·	2.7 km	MPC · JPL
698608	2018 EJ_{13}	—	March 6, 2018	Haleakala	Pan-STARRS 1	·	2.1 km	MPC · JPL
698609 Angli	2018 EQ_{13}	Angli	March 8, 2018	Xingming	Liao, X., X. Gao	·	1.8 km	MPC · JPL
698610	2018 EE_{14}	—	March 6, 2018	Haleakala	Pan-STARRS 1	·	1.9 km	MPC · JPL
698611	2018 EQ_{14}	—	March 10, 2018	Haleakala	Pan-STARRS 1	·	1.9 km	MPC · JPL
698612	2018 EY_{14}	—	March 10, 2018	Haleakala	Pan-STARRS 1	·	2.1 km	MPC · JPL
698613	2018 EB_{15}	—	March 7, 2018	Haleakala	Pan-STARRS 1	EOS	1.4 km	MPC · JPL
698614	2018 EO_{16}	—	November 25, 2016	Mount Lemmon	Mount Lemmon Survey	·	2.3 km	MPC · JPL
698615	2018 EL_{19}	—	March 10, 2018	Haleakala	Pan-STARRS 1	·	2.2 km	MPC · JPL
698616	2018 FB_{7}	—	April 19, 2013	Haleakala	Pan-STARRS 1	·	2.2 km	MPC · JPL
698617	2018 FS_{7}	—	February 19, 2009	Kitt Peak	Spacewatch	·	1.3 km	MPC · JPL
698618	2018 FB_{8}	—	February 4, 2012	Haleakala	Pan-STARRS 1	·	2.0 km	MPC · JPL
698619	2018 FS_{10}	—	October 2, 2006	Mount Lemmon	Mount Lemmon Survey	·	1.9 km	MPC · JPL
698620	2018 FV_{10}	—	July 10, 2007	Siding Spring	SSS	·	1.3 km	MPC · JPL
698621	2018 FD_{11}	—	September 26, 2006	Kitt Peak	Spacewatch	·	1.9 km	MPC · JPL
698622	2018 FO_{11}	—	February 25, 2012	Catalina	CSS	(895)	3.0 km	MPC · JPL
698623	2018 FU_{11}	—	August 21, 2015	Haleakala	Pan-STARRS 1	·	1.9 km	MPC · JPL
698624	2018 FZ_{11}	—	February 21, 2007	Mount Lemmon	Mount Lemmon Survey	EOS	1.4 km	MPC · JPL
698625	2018 FS_{12}	—	December 20, 2017	Mount Lemmon	Mount Lemmon Survey	·	2.2 km	MPC · JPL
698626	2018 FU_{12}	—	February 23, 2012	Mount Lemmon	Mount Lemmon Survey	ELF	2.6 km	MPC · JPL
698627	2018 FL_{13}	—	March 10, 2018	Haleakala	Pan-STARRS 1	·	2.1 km	MPC · JPL
698628	2018 FX_{13}	—	February 24, 2012	Mount Lemmon	Mount Lemmon Survey	·	2.2 km	MPC · JPL
698629	2018 FU_{14}	—	March 17, 2018	Haleakala	Pan-STARRS 1	·	2.0 km	MPC · JPL
698630	2018 FD_{15}	—	January 13, 2008	Mount Lemmon	Mount Lemmon Survey	·	1.5 km	MPC · JPL
698631	2018 FZ_{15}	—	March 17, 2018	Haleakala	Pan-STARRS 1	·	1.8 km	MPC · JPL
698632	2018 FH_{16}	—	January 19, 2012	Haleakala	Pan-STARRS 1	·	2.1 km	MPC · JPL
698633	2018 FM_{16}	—	January 4, 2012	Mount Lemmon	Mount Lemmon Survey	·	1.9 km	MPC · JPL
698634	2018 FT_{21}	—	January 6, 2013	Kitt Peak	Spacewatch	·	1.5 km	MPC · JPL
698635	2018 FD_{22}	—	December 4, 2016	Mount Lemmon	Mount Lemmon Survey	·	1.3 km	MPC · JPL
698636	2018 FG_{22}	—	January 26, 2012	Haleakala	Pan-STARRS 1	·	2.0 km	MPC · JPL
698637	2018 FL_{22}	—	November 11, 2010	Mount Lemmon	Mount Lemmon Survey	HYG	2.0 km	MPC · JPL
698638	2018 FH_{23}	—	February 3, 2012	Haleakala	Pan-STARRS 1	THM	1.7 km	MPC · JPL
698639	2018 FA_{25}	—	April 11, 2013	Kitt Peak	Spacewatch	EOS	1.6 km	MPC · JPL
698640	2018 FK_{25}	—	February 14, 2012	Haleakala	Pan-STARRS 1	EOS	1.5 km	MPC · JPL
698641	2018 FA_{26}	—	September 24, 2011	Mount Lemmon	Mount Lemmon Survey	·	1.7 km	MPC · JPL
698642	2018 FP_{26}	—	February 20, 2009	Kitt Peak	Spacewatch	AEO	760 m	MPC · JPL
698643	2018 FF_{27}	—	November 3, 2015	Mount Lemmon	Mount Lemmon Survey	·	1.9 km	MPC · JPL
698644	2018 FX_{27}	—	February 15, 2012	Haleakala	Pan-STARRS 1	·	2.5 km	MPC · JPL
698645	2018 FV_{32}	—	March 14, 2007	Mount Lemmon	Mount Lemmon Survey	LIX	2.4 km	MPC · JPL
698646	2018 FK_{34}	—	March 21, 2018	Mount Lemmon	Mount Lemmon Survey	EUP	2.2 km	MPC · JPL
698647	2018 FJ_{35}	—	March 18, 2018	Haleakala	Pan-STARRS 1	THM	1.7 km	MPC · JPL
698648	2018 FP_{35}	—	March 17, 2018	Haleakala	Pan-STARRS 1	·	2.4 km	MPC · JPL
698649	2018 FQ_{35}	—	March 18, 2018	Mount Lemmon	Mount Lemmon Survey	·	2.3 km	MPC · JPL
698650	2018 FQ_{37}	—	March 17, 2018	Haleakala	Pan-STARRS 1	·	1.9 km	MPC · JPL
698651	2018 FR_{37}	—	March 17, 2018	Haleakala	Pan-STARRS 1	·	2.2 km	MPC · JPL
698652	2018 FH_{38}	—	March 18, 2018	Haleakala	Pan-STARRS 1	EOS	1.4 km	MPC · JPL
698653	2018 FM_{38}	—	March 18, 2018	Haleakala	Pan-STARRS 1	·	2.8 km	MPC · JPL
698654	2018 FU_{38}	—	March 18, 2018	Mount Lemmon	Mount Lemmon Survey	·	2.4 km	MPC · JPL
698655	2018 FA_{39}	—	March 20, 2018	Mount Lemmon	Mount Lemmon Survey	·	1.8 km	MPC · JPL
698656	2018 FC_{40}	—	April 23, 2014	Cerro Tololo	DECam	EUN	810 m	MPC · JPL
698657	2018 FS_{41}	—	March 18, 2018	Haleakala	Pan-STARRS 1	·	2.1 km	MPC · JPL
698658	2018 FR_{42}	—	March 18, 2018	Haleakala	Pan-STARRS 1	·	2.3 km	MPC · JPL
698659	2018 FJ_{43}	—	March 21, 2018	Mount Lemmon	Mount Lemmon Survey	·	2.6 km	MPC · JPL
698660	2018 FN_{43}	—	October 2, 2010	Mount Lemmon	Mount Lemmon Survey	·	2.0 km	MPC · JPL
698661	2018 FS_{44}	—	March 18, 2018	Mount Lemmon	Mount Lemmon Survey	·	2.5 km	MPC · JPL
698662	2018 FN_{45}	—	March 17, 2018	Haleakala	Pan-STARRS 1	·	2.5 km	MPC · JPL
698663	2018 FG_{46}	—	March 18, 2018	Haleakala	Pan-STARRS 1	3:2	4.5 km	MPC · JPL
698664	2018 FX_{46}	—	March 17, 2018	Haleakala	Pan-STARRS 1	T_{j} (2.9)	3.0 km	MPC · JPL
698665	2018 FA_{47}	—	March 18, 2018	Haleakala	Pan-STARRS 1	·	2.2 km	MPC · JPL
698666	2018 FG_{47}	—	March 17, 2018	Haleakala	Pan-STARRS 1	VER	2.1 km	MPC · JPL
698667	2018 FJ_{47}	—	March 23, 2018	Mount Lemmon	Mount Lemmon Survey	·	2.4 km	MPC · JPL
698668	2018 FK_{47}	—	March 16, 2018	Mount Lemmon	Mount Lemmon Survey	EOS	1.5 km	MPC · JPL
698669	2018 FM_{47}	—	March 17, 2018	Mount Lemmon	Mount Lemmon Survey	·	1.9 km	MPC · JPL
698670	2018 FC_{50}	—	March 18, 2018	Haleakala	Pan-STARRS 1	·	2.3 km	MPC · JPL
698671	2018 FA_{51}	—	November 30, 2005	Kitt Peak	Spacewatch	·	2.1 km	MPC · JPL
698672	2018 FB_{51}	—	March 16, 2018	Mount Lemmon	Mount Lemmon Survey	THB	2.6 km	MPC · JPL
698673	2018 FW_{51}	—	March 17, 2018	Mount Lemmon	Mount Lemmon Survey	·	2.4 km	MPC · JPL
698674	2018 FQ_{52}	—	March 16, 2018	Mount Lemmon	Mount Lemmon Survey	(31811)	2.1 km	MPC · JPL
698675	2018 FV_{52}	—	March 18, 2018	Haleakala	Pan-STARRS 1	·	2.1 km	MPC · JPL
698676	2018 FK_{57}	—	March 17, 2018	Mount Lemmon	Mount Lemmon Survey	·	2.4 km	MPC · JPL
698677	2018 FR_{58}	—	March 17, 2018	Haleakala	Pan-STARRS 1	·	2.0 km	MPC · JPL
698678	2018 FS_{61}	—	March 22, 2018	Mount Lemmon	Mount Lemmon Survey	LUT	2.9 km	MPC · JPL
698679	2018 FH_{62}	—	March 23, 2018	Mount Lemmon	Mount Lemmon Survey	·	2.1 km	MPC · JPL
698680	2018 FX_{69}	—	March 18, 2018	Haleakala	Pan-STARRS 1	·	2.2 km	MPC · JPL
698681	2018 FT_{70}	—	March 17, 2018	Mount Lemmon	Mount Lemmon Survey	·	2.2 km	MPC · JPL
698682	2018 GW_{6}	—	February 26, 2012	Haleakala	Pan-STARRS 1	·	2.6 km	MPC · JPL
698683	2018 GX_{6}	—	February 8, 2013	Haleakala	Pan-STARRS 1	NEM	2.1 km	MPC · JPL
698684	2018 GJ_{8}	—	April 12, 2018	Haleakala	Pan-STARRS 1	URS	2.5 km	MPC · JPL
698685	2018 GQ_{8}	—	October 17, 1995	Kitt Peak	Spacewatch	·	1.7 km	MPC · JPL
698686	2018 GW_{9}	—	April 15, 2007	Kitt Peak	Spacewatch	·	2.6 km	MPC · JPL
698687	2018 GZ_{9}	—	May 11, 2013	Mount Lemmon	Mount Lemmon Survey	·	2.2 km	MPC · JPL
698688	2018 GY_{10}	—	September 17, 2006	Kitt Peak	Spacewatch	AGN	1.1 km	MPC · JPL
698689	2018 GQ_{17}	—	April 11, 2018	Kitt Peak	Spacewatch	URS	2.3 km	MPC · JPL
698690	2018 GB_{19}	—	April 13, 2018	Haleakala	Pan-STARRS 1	·	2.2 km	MPC · JPL
698691	2018 GE_{19}	—	April 19, 2007	Mount Lemmon	Mount Lemmon Survey	URS	2.3 km	MPC · JPL
698692	2018 GW_{20}	—	November 22, 2014	Haleakala	Pan-STARRS 1	·	2.7 km	MPC · JPL
698693	2018 GH_{23}	—	April 10, 2018	Mount Lemmon	Mount Lemmon Survey	·	2.8 km	MPC · JPL
698694	2018 GJ_{31}	—	April 14, 2018	Mount Lemmon	Mount Lemmon Survey	·	2.5 km	MPC · JPL
698695	2018 HJ_{1}	—	March 16, 2007	Mount Lemmon	Mount Lemmon Survey	·	2.4 km	MPC · JPL
698696	2018 HV_{6}	—	April 23, 2018	Mount Lemmon	Mount Lemmon Survey	EUN	840 m	MPC · JPL
698697	2018 HU_{8}	—	December 3, 2005	Mauna Kea	A. Boattini	·	2.0 km	MPC · JPL
698698	2018 JP_{4}	—	March 22, 2012	Catalina	CSS	·	2.8 km	MPC · JPL
698699	2018 JW_{5}	—	October 21, 2006	Mount Lemmon	Mount Lemmon Survey	NEM	1.9 km	MPC · JPL
698700	2018 KD_{11}	—	May 19, 2018	Haleakala	Pan-STARRS 1	·	540 m	MPC · JPL

== 698701–698800 ==
back to top

Designation			Discovery			Properties		Ref
Permanent	Provisional	Named after	Date	Site	Discoverer(s)	Category	Diam.	Ref
698701	2018 LK_{1}	—	January 16, 2005	Mauna Kea	Veillet, C.	·	2.8 km	MPC · JPL
698702	2018 LF_{2}	—	May 19, 2018	Haleakala	Pan-STARRS 1	TEL	910 m	MPC · JPL
698703	2018 LE_{7}	—	March 25, 2007	Mount Lemmon	Mount Lemmon Survey	·	2.1 km	MPC · JPL
698704	2018 LA_{10}	—	February 23, 2012	Mount Lemmon	Mount Lemmon Survey	·	2.1 km	MPC · JPL
698705	2018 LM_{10}	—	November 18, 2015	Haleakala	Pan-STARRS 1	·	2.8 km	MPC · JPL
698706	2018 LC_{21}	—	June 15, 2018	Haleakala	Pan-STARRS 1	·	470 m	MPC · JPL
698707	2018 LA_{23}	—	June 14, 2018	Mauna Kea	D. J. Tholen	·	540 m	MPC · JPL
698708	2018 LY_{23}	—	October 12, 2010	Mount Lemmon	Mount Lemmon Survey	KOR	930 m	MPC · JPL
698709	2018 LR_{25}	—	June 3, 2018	Haleakala	Pan-STARRS 1	·	580 m	MPC · JPL
698710	2018 LF_{52}	—	June 15, 2018	Haleakala	Pan-STARRS 1	·	1.8 km	MPC · JPL
698711	2018 MU_{5}	—	September 14, 2013	Haleakala	Pan-STARRS 1	·	2.9 km	MPC · JPL
698712	2018 MS_{7}	—	November 20, 2003	Kitt Peak	Spacewatch	·	2.5 km	MPC · JPL
698713	2018 ME_{8}	—	August 14, 2001	Palomar	NEAT	·	1.8 km	MPC · JPL
698714	2018 MF_{19}	—	June 18, 2018	Haleakala	Pan-STARRS 1	·	540 m	MPC · JPL
698715	2018 NL_{5}	—	February 9, 2011	Mount Lemmon	Mount Lemmon Survey	EOS	1.6 km	MPC · JPL
698716	2018 NK_{7}	—	April 21, 2006	Kitt Peak	Spacewatch	·	2.7 km	MPC · JPL
698717	2018 NP_{10}	—	February 18, 2012	Catalina	CSS	·	1.9 km	MPC · JPL
698718	2018 NJ_{15}	—	October 15, 2015	Haleakala	Pan-STARRS 1	·	610 m	MPC · JPL
698719	2018 NY_{21}	—	July 12, 2018	Haleakala	Pan-STARRS 1	·	950 m	MPC · JPL
698720	2018 NR_{29}	—	July 8, 2018	Haleakala	Pan-STARRS 1	L4	5.6 km	MPC · JPL
698721	2018 NQ_{34}	—	July 8, 2018	Haleakala	Pan-STARRS 1	·	420 m	MPC · JPL
698722	2018 NM_{43}	—	July 4, 2018	Haleakala	Pan-STARRS 1	·	1.1 km	MPC · JPL
698723	2018 NP_{45}	—	July 9, 2018	Haleakala	Pan-STARRS 1	AGN	990 m	MPC · JPL
698724	2018 NU_{47}	—	July 9, 2018	Haleakala	Pan-STARRS 1	KOR	1.1 km	MPC · JPL
698725	2018 OM_{1}	—	October 8, 2015	Haleakala	Pan-STARRS 1	·	540 m	MPC · JPL
698726	2018 PN_{3}	—	March 28, 2011	Mount Lemmon	Mount Lemmon Survey	·	530 m	MPC · JPL
698727	2018 PD_{7}	—	June 18, 2012	Mount Lemmon	Mount Lemmon Survey	·	2.8 km	MPC · JPL
698728	2018 PE_{11}	—	November 7, 2012	Mount Lemmon	Mount Lemmon Survey	·	540 m	MPC · JPL
698729	2018 PK_{13}	—	April 30, 2008	Kitt Peak	Spacewatch	·	530 m	MPC · JPL
698730	2018 PL_{16}	—	September 14, 2013	Haleakala	Pan-STARRS 1	·	2.3 km	MPC · JPL
698731	2018 PC_{17}	—	May 21, 2012	Haleakala	Pan-STARRS 1	·	2.4 km	MPC · JPL
698732	2018 PW_{31}	—	September 16, 2002	Palomar	NEAT	·	2.7 km	MPC · JPL
698733	2018 PL_{43}	—	August 7, 2018	Haleakala	Pan-STARRS 1	·	570 m	MPC · JPL
698734	2018 PD_{44}	—	August 7, 2018	Haleakala	Pan-STARRS 1	·	900 m	MPC · JPL
698735	2018 PU_{50}	—	August 13, 2018	Haleakala	Pan-STARRS 1	·	520 m	MPC · JPL
698736	2018 PH_{52}	—	August 5, 2018	Haleakala	Pan-STARRS 1	·	530 m	MPC · JPL
698737	2018 PR_{59}	—	August 7, 2018	Haleakala	Pan-STARRS 1	·	750 m	MPC · JPL
698738	2018 PP_{72}	—	February 28, 2014	Haleakala	Pan-STARRS 1	L4	6.7 km	MPC · JPL
698739	2018 PJ_{76}	—	August 6, 2018	Haleakala	Pan-STARRS 1	·	840 m	MPC · JPL
698740	2018 PJ_{97}	—	August 6, 2018	Haleakala	Pan-STARRS 1	·	620 m	MPC · JPL
698741	2018 PE_{131}	—	September 5, 2008	Kitt Peak	Spacewatch	·	420 m	MPC · JPL
698742	2018 QK_{3}	—	April 25, 2006	Kitt Peak	Spacewatch	·	2.4 km	MPC · JPL
698743	2018 QF_{7}	—	April 10, 2005	Mount Lemmon	Mount Lemmon Survey	EOS	2.3 km	MPC · JPL
698744	2018 QZ_{12}	—	December 8, 2015	Mount Lemmon	Mount Lemmon Survey	·	410 m	MPC · JPL
698745	2018 QE_{13}	—	August 19, 2018	Haleakala	Pan-STARRS 1	·	820 m	MPC · JPL
698746	2018 QT_{15}	—	March 10, 2005	Mount Lemmon	Mount Lemmon Survey	·	2.4 km	MPC · JPL
698747	2018 RC_{13}	—	August 19, 2018	Haleakala	Pan-STARRS 1	·	590 m	MPC · JPL
698748	2018 RT_{13}	—	September 12, 2001	Socorro	LINEAR	·	580 m	MPC · JPL
698749	2018 RV_{13}	—	December 17, 2015	Mount Lemmon	Mount Lemmon Survey	·	570 m	MPC · JPL
698750	2018 RO_{16}	—	August 19, 2006	Kitt Peak	Spacewatch	·	3.3 km	MPC · JPL
698751	2018 RF_{17}	—	June 22, 2011	Mount Lemmon	Mount Lemmon Survey	V	560 m	MPC · JPL
698752	2018 RL_{17}	—	December 3, 2015	Haleakala	Pan-STARRS 1	·	660 m	MPC · JPL
698753	2018 RN_{17}	—	October 16, 2015	Kitt Peak	Spacewatch	·	560 m	MPC · JPL
698754	2018 RA_{18}	—	September 28, 2002	Haleakala	NEAT	·	3.6 km	MPC · JPL
698755	2018 RF_{19}	—	September 23, 2015	Haleakala	Pan-STARRS 1	·	580 m	MPC · JPL
698756	2018 RK_{19}	—	April 5, 2014	Haleakala	Pan-STARRS 1	·	570 m	MPC · JPL
698757	2018 RZ_{23}	—	November 20, 2008	Kitt Peak	Spacewatch	·	740 m	MPC · JPL
698758	2018 RQ_{26}	—	February 1, 2016	Haleakala	Pan-STARRS 1	·	1.3 km	MPC · JPL
698759	2018 RG_{30}	—	July 19, 2007	Mount Lemmon	Mount Lemmon Survey	·	3.1 km	MPC · JPL
698760	2018 RP_{30}	—	August 24, 2011	Haleakala	Pan-STARRS 1	·	660 m	MPC · JPL
698761	2018 RR_{32}	—	August 25, 2011	Mayhill-ISON	L. Elenin	·	680 m	MPC · JPL
698762	2018 RW_{34}	—	October 23, 2005	Catalina	CSS	·	540 m	MPC · JPL
698763	2018 RW_{35}	—	May 27, 2014	Mount Lemmon	Mount Lemmon Survey	·	700 m	MPC · JPL
698764	2018 RK_{38}	—	January 17, 2004	Kitt Peak	Spacewatch	·	3.0 km	MPC · JPL
698765	2018 SY_{3}	—	December 1, 2008	Kitt Peak	Spacewatch	EUP	4.4 km	MPC · JPL
698766	2018 SV_{10}	—	July 1, 2011	Mount Lemmon	Mount Lemmon Survey	·	670 m	MPC · JPL
698767	2018 SW_{15}	—	November 2, 2007	Mount Lemmon	Mount Lemmon Survey	·	2.6 km	MPC · JPL
698768	2018 SC_{21}	—	March 27, 2016	Cerro Tololo	DECam	MAR	740 m	MPC · JPL
698769	2018 TP_{10}	—	September 24, 2011	Haleakala	Pan-STARRS 1	V	540 m	MPC · JPL
698770	2018 TS_{25}	—	October 5, 2018	Mount Lemmon	Mount Lemmon Survey	·	640 m	MPC · JPL
698771	2018 TT_{29}	—	October 3, 2018	Haleakala	Pan-STARRS 2	RAF	560 m	MPC · JPL
698772	2018 TV_{34}	—	March 13, 2016	Flagstaff	Wasserman, L. H.	·	840 m	MPC · JPL
698773	2018 TX_{34}	—	October 6, 2018	Mount Lemmon	Mount Lemmon Survey	·	920 m	MPC · JPL
698774	2018 UT_{4}	—	February 13, 2012	Haleakala	Pan-STARRS 1	·	1.3 km	MPC · JPL
698775	2018 UT_{6}	—	September 23, 2011	Kitt Peak	Spacewatch	(2076)	700 m	MPC · JPL
698776	2018 US_{7}	—	October 20, 2011	Mount Lemmon	Mount Lemmon Survey	·	820 m	MPC · JPL
698777	2018 UY_{9}	—	September 19, 2015	Haleakala	Pan-STARRS 1	·	920 m	MPC · JPL
698778	2018 UZ_{9}	—	August 29, 2011	Siding Spring	SSS	·	610 m	MPC · JPL
698779	2018 UC_{10}	—	October 20, 2011	Mount Lemmon	Mount Lemmon Survey	V	570 m	MPC · JPL
698780	2018 UE_{11}	—	November 1, 2011	Mount Lemmon	Mount Lemmon Survey	·	790 m	MPC · JPL
698781	2018 UP_{12}	—	October 23, 2011	Mount Lemmon	Mount Lemmon Survey	·	570 m	MPC · JPL
698782	2018 UJ_{13}	—	December 18, 2015	Mount Lemmon	Mount Lemmon Survey	V	510 m	MPC · JPL
698783	2018 UL_{13}	—	January 3, 2016	Haleakala	Pan-STARRS 1	(2076)	570 m	MPC · JPL
698784	2018 UO_{14}	—	September 10, 2018	Mount Lemmon	Mount Lemmon Survey	·	600 m	MPC · JPL
698785	2018 UQ_{14}	—	April 13, 2011	Mount Lemmon	Mount Lemmon Survey	·	1.4 km	MPC · JPL
698786	2018 UD_{15}	—	November 16, 2011	Kitt Peak	Spacewatch	·	870 m	MPC · JPL
698787	2018 UD_{16}	—	November 7, 2008	Mount Lemmon	Mount Lemmon Survey	·	680 m	MPC · JPL
698788	2018 UF_{16}	—	January 21, 2012	Catalina	CSS	NYS	1.1 km	MPC · JPL
698789	2018 UP_{16}	—	November 4, 2007	Mount Lemmon	Mount Lemmon Survey	·	2.6 km	MPC · JPL
698790	2018 UU_{17}	—	December 25, 2011	Catalina	CSS	PHO	930 m	MPC · JPL
698791	2018 UX_{17}	—	July 28, 2011	Haleakala	Pan-STARRS 1	·	550 m	MPC · JPL
698792	2018 UJ_{25}	—	October 2, 1995	Kitt Peak	Spacewatch	·	1.4 km	MPC · JPL
698793	2018 UH_{27}	—	October 18, 2018	Mount Lemmon	Mount Lemmon Survey	·	570 m	MPC · JPL
698794	2018 UB_{28}	—	October 16, 2018	Haleakala	Pan-STARRS 2	·	880 m	MPC · JPL
698795	2018 UY_{29}	—	October 29, 2018	Mount Lemmon	Mount Lemmon Survey	·	2.8 km	MPC · JPL
698796	2018 UH_{30}	—	October 16, 2018	Haleakala	Pan-STARRS 2	EOS	1.3 km	MPC · JPL
698797	2018 UD_{36}	—	October 18, 2018	Mount Lemmon	Mount Lemmon Survey	·	570 m	MPC · JPL
698798	2018 UG_{38}	—	January 24, 2015	Haleakala	Pan-STARRS 1	·	1.0 km	MPC · JPL
698799	2018 VJ	—	July 31, 2014	Haleakala	Pan-STARRS 1	·	1.2 km	MPC · JPL
698800	2018 VV_{12}	—	January 18, 2012	Mount Lemmon	Mount Lemmon Survey	·	970 m	MPC · JPL

== 698801–698900 ==
back to top

Designation			Discovery			Properties		Ref
Permanent	Provisional	Named after	Date	Site	Discoverer(s)	Category	Diam.	Ref
698801	2018 VY_{12}	—	February 17, 2010	Kitt Peak	Spacewatch	·	650 m	MPC · JPL
698802	2018 VU_{15}	—	January 28, 2006	Mount Lemmon	Mount Lemmon Survey	·	760 m	MPC · JPL
698803	2018 VA_{17}	—	July 1, 2014	Haleakala	Pan-STARRS 1	·	910 m	MPC · JPL
698804	2018 VO_{17}	—	January 7, 2016	Haleakala	Pan-STARRS 1	·	690 m	MPC · JPL
698805	2018 VY_{22}	—	January 25, 2009	Kitt Peak	Spacewatch	·	1.0 km	MPC · JPL
698806	2018 VS_{23}	—	October 20, 2011	Mount Lemmon	Mount Lemmon Survey	·	690 m	MPC · JPL
698807	2018 VR_{30}	—	October 2, 2005	Anderson Mesa	LONEOS	·	2.3 km	MPC · JPL
698808	2018 VP_{32}	—	September 15, 2013	Catalina	CSS	(32418)	2.0 km	MPC · JPL
698809	2018 VN_{36}	—	December 3, 2005	Mauna Kea	A. Boattini	·	720 m	MPC · JPL
698810	2018 VM_{37}	—	April 3, 2011	Haleakala	Pan-STARRS 1	·	1.4 km	MPC · JPL
698811	2018 VJ_{43}	—	September 20, 2011	Haleakala	Pan-STARRS 1	·	490 m	MPC · JPL
698812	2018 VV_{49}	—	October 16, 2007	Mount Lemmon	Mount Lemmon Survey	·	800 m	MPC · JPL
698813	2018 VQ_{55}	—	September 17, 2006	Kitt Peak	Spacewatch	·	2.4 km	MPC · JPL
698814	2018 VK_{59}	—	December 20, 2006	Mount Lemmon	Mount Lemmon Survey	·	840 m	MPC · JPL
698815	2018 VU_{62}	—	August 23, 2014	Haleakala	Pan-STARRS 1	·	1.1 km	MPC · JPL
698816	2018 VX_{66}	—	May 28, 2000	Kitt Peak	Spacewatch	·	2.9 km	MPC · JPL
698817	2018 VM_{69}	—	December 13, 2010	Catalina	CSS	·	1.2 km	MPC · JPL
698818	2018 VD_{70}	—	December 10, 2014	Mount Lemmon	Mount Lemmon Survey	·	1.1 km	MPC · JPL
698819	2018 VX_{70}	—	October 28, 2011	Mount Lemmon	Mount Lemmon Survey	·	760 m	MPC · JPL
698820	2018 VB_{75}	—	October 10, 2007	Mount Lemmon	Mount Lemmon Survey	·	870 m	MPC · JPL
698821	2018 VL_{76}	—	December 26, 2006	Kitt Peak	Spacewatch	(5)	1.2 km	MPC · JPL
698822	2018 VU_{78}	—	August 28, 2014	Haleakala	Pan-STARRS 1	·	930 m	MPC · JPL
698823	2018 VD_{81}	—	December 3, 2004	Kitt Peak	Spacewatch	·	940 m	MPC · JPL
698824	2018 VH_{87}	—	October 10, 2018	Mount Lemmon	Mount Lemmon Survey	·	1.2 km	MPC · JPL
698825	2018 VW_{87}	—	July 25, 2014	Haleakala	Pan-STARRS 1	·	700 m	MPC · JPL
698826	2018 VT_{95}	—	October 23, 2011	Kitt Peak	Spacewatch	·	790 m	MPC · JPL
698827	2018 VN_{98}	—	October 9, 2004	Socorro	LINEAR	·	640 m	MPC · JPL
698828	2018 VX_{99}	—	January 20, 2015	Haleakala	Pan-STARRS 1	·	780 m	MPC · JPL
698829	2018 VL_{101}	—	November 13, 2010	Mount Lemmon	Mount Lemmon Survey	·	800 m	MPC · JPL
698830	2018 VE_{102}	—	October 23, 2003	Kitt Peak	Spacewatch	·	940 m	MPC · JPL
698831	2018 VT_{103}	—	October 29, 2008	Kitt Peak	Spacewatch	·	490 m	MPC · JPL
698832	2018 VY_{103}	—	February 2, 2008	Mount Lemmon	Mount Lemmon Survey	·	1.0 km	MPC · JPL
698833	2018 VK_{105}	—	November 14, 2006	Mount Lemmon	Mount Lemmon Survey	·	770 m	MPC · JPL
698834	2018 VC_{106}	—	December 11, 2010	Mount Lemmon	Mount Lemmon Survey	·	810 m	MPC · JPL
698835	2018 VK_{112}	—	September 15, 2013	Mount Lemmon	Mount Lemmon Survey	EUN	1.1 km	MPC · JPL
698836	2018 VX_{125}	—	November 13, 2018	Haleakala	Pan-STARRS 2	·	970 m	MPC · JPL
698837	2018 VL_{126}	—	November 7, 2018	Mount Lemmon	Mount Lemmon Survey	BAR	990 m	MPC · JPL
698838	2018 VE_{128}	—	November 2, 2018	Haleakala	Pan-STARRS 2	·	1.0 km	MPC · JPL
698839	2018 VS_{130}	—	November 2, 2018	Mount Lemmon	Mount Lemmon Survey	·	1.2 km	MPC · JPL
698840	2018 VV_{130}	—	November 8, 2018	Mount Lemmon	Mount Lemmon Survey	·	530 m	MPC · JPL
698841	2018 VX_{130}	—	November 9, 2018	Haleakala	Pan-STARRS 2	·	460 m	MPC · JPL
698842	2018 VZ_{131}	—	November 6, 2018	Haleakala	Pan-STARRS 2	·	1.1 km	MPC · JPL
698843	2018 VW_{143}	—	November 8, 2018	Haleakala	Pan-STARRS 2	·	460 m	MPC · JPL
698844	2018 VW_{145}	—	November 3, 2018	Mount Lemmon	Mount Lemmon Survey	·	1.2 km	MPC · JPL
698845	2018 VX_{150}	—	November 6, 2018	Haleakala	Pan-STARRS 2	·	580 m	MPC · JPL
698846	2018 VH_{151}	—	November 4, 2018	Mount Lemmon	Mount Lemmon Survey	(194)	1.1 km	MPC · JPL
698847 Zhangguimin	2018 VR_{154}	Zhangguimin	October 14, 2009	XuYi	PMO NEO Survey Program	(194)	1.5 km	MPC · JPL
698848	2018 VA_{167}	—	January 15, 2015	Haleakala	Pan-STARRS 1	EUN	760 m	MPC · JPL
698849	2018 WJ_{9}	—	December 10, 2014	Mount Lemmon	Mount Lemmon Survey	·	790 m	MPC · JPL
698850	2018 WX_{12}	—	November 17, 2018	Mount Lemmon	Mount Lemmon Survey	EUN	840 m	MPC · JPL
698851	2018 XH_{3}	—	September 3, 2002	Palomar	NEAT	H	450 m	MPC · JPL
698852	2018 XL_{7}	—	November 26, 2014	Haleakala	Pan-STARRS 1	·	1.2 km	MPC · JPL
698853	2018 XQ_{9}	—	December 23, 2014	Catalina	CSS	·	1.3 km	MPC · JPL
698854	2018 XV_{13}	—	December 16, 2014	Haleakala	Pan-STARRS 1	·	1.1 km	MPC · JPL
698855	2018 XD_{15}	—	January 18, 2004	Palomar	NEAT	·	1 km	MPC · JPL
698856	2018 XQ_{15}	—	April 30, 2005	Kitt Peak	Spacewatch	·	3.0 km	MPC · JPL
698857	2018 XG_{17}	—	November 30, 2005	Mount Lemmon	Mount Lemmon Survey	·	1.1 km	MPC · JPL
698858	2018 XV_{19}	—	September 29, 2009	Mount Lemmon	Mount Lemmon Survey	·	2.0 km	MPC · JPL
698859	2018 XY_{19}	—	February 17, 2015	Haleakala	Pan-STARRS 1	JUN	840 m	MPC · JPL
698860	2018 XS_{25}	—	April 9, 2016	Haleakala	Pan-STARRS 1	MAR	710 m	MPC · JPL
698861	2018 XH_{27}	—	November 15, 2017	Mount Lemmon	Mount Lemmon Survey	·	2.2 km	MPC · JPL
698862	2018 XB_{28}	—	December 3, 2018	ESA OGS	ESA OGS	PHO	730 m	MPC · JPL
698863	2018 XV_{31}	—	December 15, 2018	Haleakala	Pan-STARRS 1	PHO	680 m	MPC · JPL
698864	2018 XA_{32}	—	December 10, 2018	Mount Lemmon	Mount Lemmon Survey	EUN	960 m	MPC · JPL
698865	2018 XF_{34}	—	December 13, 2018	Haleakala	Pan-STARRS 1	·	1.9 km	MPC · JPL
698866	2018 XL_{35}	—	January 20, 2015	Mount Lemmon	Mount Lemmon Survey	EUN	820 m	MPC · JPL
698867	2018 XX_{40}	—	December 10, 2018	Mount Lemmon	Mount Lemmon Survey	·	1.1 km	MPC · JPL
698868	2018 YC_{3}	—	July 2, 2014	Haleakala	Pan-STARRS 1	·	660 m	MPC · JPL
698869	2018 YA_{7}	—	January 25, 2015	Haleakala	Pan-STARRS 1	EUN	1 km	MPC · JPL
698870	2018 YP_{8}	—	September 16, 2017	Haleakala	Pan-STARRS 1	·	950 m	MPC · JPL
698871	2018 YU_{8}	—	December 17, 2018	Haleakala	Pan-STARRS 1	·	720 m	MPC · JPL
698872	2018 YC_{10}	—	April 21, 2015	Cerro Tololo	DECam	·	1.3 km	MPC · JPL
698873	2018 YO_{15}	—	April 18, 2015	Cerro Tololo	DECam	·	1.4 km	MPC · JPL
698874	2018 YP_{15}	—	December 16, 2018	Haleakala	Pan-STARRS 1	·	1.4 km	MPC · JPL
698875	2018 YV_{15}	—	July 29, 2017	Haleakala	Pan-STARRS 1	SUL	1.5 km	MPC · JPL
698876	2019 AJ_{16}	—	January 14, 2019	Haleakala	Pan-STARRS 1	centaur	30 km	MPC · JPL
698877	2019 AT_{16}	—	December 26, 2014	Haleakala	Pan-STARRS 1	·	1.1 km	MPC · JPL
698878	2019 AA_{19}	—	December 16, 2014	Haleakala	Pan-STARRS 1	PHO	810 m	MPC · JPL
698879	2019 AC_{20}	—	September 27, 2006	Kitt Peak	Spacewatch	NYS	1.1 km	MPC · JPL
698880	2019 AH_{21}	—	August 16, 2017	Haleakala	Pan-STARRS 1	·	1.4 km	MPC · JPL
698881	2019 AL_{21}	—	June 3, 2006	Mount Lemmon	Mount Lemmon Survey	PHO	950 m	MPC · JPL
698882	2019 AD_{27}	—	August 26, 2013	Haleakala	Pan-STARRS 1	·	930 m	MPC · JPL
698883	2019 AD_{28}	—	January 8, 2002	Socorro	LINEAR	·	1.4 km	MPC · JPL
698884	2019 AO_{28}	—	April 29, 2009	Mount Lemmon	Mount Lemmon Survey	·	1.0 km	MPC · JPL
698885	2019 AW_{29}	—	March 23, 2004	Kitt Peak	Spacewatch	·	2.5 km	MPC · JPL
698886	2019 AP_{30}	—	December 29, 2005	Mount Lemmon	Mount Lemmon Survey	·	1.7 km	MPC · JPL
698887	2019 AC_{31}	—	April 5, 2011	Catalina	CSS	·	1.3 km	MPC · JPL
698888	2019 AF_{31}	—	December 1, 2014	Haleakala	Pan-STARRS 1	·	1.1 km	MPC · JPL
698889	2019 AX_{31}	—	September 18, 2009	Mount Lemmon	Mount Lemmon Survey	·	960 m	MPC · JPL
698890	2019 AA_{32}	—	August 27, 2005	Palomar	NEAT	·	2.9 km	MPC · JPL
698891	2019 AK_{35}	—	September 17, 2017	Haleakala	Pan-STARRS 1	·	730 m	MPC · JPL
698892	2019 AK_{36}	—	October 1, 2017	Mount Lemmon	Mount Lemmon Survey	·	1.2 km	MPC · JPL
698893	2019 AN_{37}	—	October 18, 2009	Catalina	CSS	·	1.3 km	MPC · JPL
698894	2019 AH_{42}	—	December 21, 2014	Haleakala	Pan-STARRS 1	·	820 m	MPC · JPL
698895	2019 AY_{42}	—	November 19, 2006	Catalina	CSS	·	1.6 km	MPC · JPL
698896	2019 AM_{47}	—	January 6, 2019	Haleakala	Pan-STARRS 1	EUN	890 m	MPC · JPL
698897	2019 AH_{48}	—	August 3, 2016	Haleakala	Pan-STARRS 1	·	1.5 km	MPC · JPL
698898	2019 AA_{50}	—	July 7, 2016	Haleakala	Pan-STARRS 1	·	1.8 km	MPC · JPL
698899	2019 AH_{51}	—	January 22, 2015	Haleakala	Pan-STARRS 1	·	1.3 km	MPC · JPL
698900	2019 AN_{51}	—	January 6, 2019	Haleakala	Pan-STARRS 1	·	1.5 km	MPC · JPL

== 698901–699000 ==
back to top

Designation			Discovery			Properties		Ref
Permanent	Provisional	Named after	Date	Site	Discoverer(s)	Category	Diam.	Ref
698901	2019 AT_{52}	—	January 23, 2015	Haleakala	Pan-STARRS 1	·	1.4 km	MPC · JPL
698902	2019 AM_{54}	—	January 11, 2019	Haleakala	Pan-STARRS 1	BRG	1.5 km	MPC · JPL
698903	2019 AR_{54}	—	January 3, 2019	Haleakala	Pan-STARRS 1	·	1.3 km	MPC · JPL
698904	2019 AW_{54}	—	January 3, 2019	Haleakala	Pan-STARRS 1	·	1.4 km	MPC · JPL
698905	2019 AH_{55}	—	January 31, 2009	Mount Lemmon	Mount Lemmon Survey	·	1.7 km	MPC · JPL
698906	2019 AW_{55}	—	January 2, 2019	Haleakala	Pan-STARRS 1	·	1.3 km	MPC · JPL
698907	2019 AA_{56}	—	January 10, 2019	Haleakala	Pan-STARRS 1	·	1.3 km	MPC · JPL
698908	2019 AZ_{56}	—	January 14, 2019	Haleakala	Pan-STARRS 1	·	1.5 km	MPC · JPL
698909	2019 AB_{57}	—	January 9, 2019	Haleakala	Pan-STARRS 1	·	1.6 km	MPC · JPL
698910	2019 AP_{58}	—	January 31, 2015	Haleakala	Pan-STARRS 1	·	1.5 km	MPC · JPL
698911	2019 AD_{59}	—	January 2, 2019	Haleakala	Pan-STARRS 1	·	1.1 km	MPC · JPL
698912	2019 AF_{59}	—	January 4, 2019	Haleakala	Pan-STARRS 1	·	1.3 km	MPC · JPL
698913	2019 AM_{59}	—	January 13, 2019	Haleakala	Pan-STARRS 1	·	900 m	MPC · JPL
698914	2019 AS_{59}	—	January 14, 2019	Haleakala	Pan-STARRS 1	HNS	890 m	MPC · JPL
698915	2019 AT_{59}	—	January 14, 2019	Haleakala	Pan-STARRS 1	·	1.3 km	MPC · JPL
698916	2019 AC_{60}	—	January 4, 2019	Haleakala	Pan-STARRS 1	PHO	840 m	MPC · JPL
698917	2019 AG_{60}	—	January 8, 2019	Haleakala	Pan-STARRS 1	·	1.2 km	MPC · JPL
698918	2019 AJ_{60}	—	January 3, 2019	Haleakala	Pan-STARRS 1	·	1.4 km	MPC · JPL
698919	2019 AM_{60}	—	January 14, 2019	Haleakala	Pan-STARRS 1	·	910 m	MPC · JPL
698920	2019 AN_{60}	—	January 3, 2019	Haleakala	Pan-STARRS 1	·	1.2 km	MPC · JPL
698921	2019 AT_{60}	—	January 12, 2019	Haleakala	Pan-STARRS 1	BRA	1.5 km	MPC · JPL
698922	2019 AH_{66}	—	January 8, 2019	Haleakala	Pan-STARRS 1	·	1.5 km	MPC · JPL
698923	2019 AK_{66}	—	January 9, 2019	Haleakala	Pan-STARRS 1	·	880 m	MPC · JPL
698924	2019 AO_{66}	—	January 14, 2019	Haleakala	Pan-STARRS 1	·	1.4 km	MPC · JPL
698925	2019 AB_{71}	—	January 9, 2019	Haleakala	Pan-STARRS 1	·	1.1 km	MPC · JPL
698926	2019 AW_{71}	—	January 2, 2019	Haleakala	Pan-STARRS 1	·	1.2 km	MPC · JPL
698927	2019 AD_{72}	—	June 11, 2015	Haleakala	Pan-STARRS 1	EOS	1.2 km	MPC · JPL
698928	2019 AW_{74}	—	January 4, 2019	Haleakala	Pan-STARRS 1	·	1.1 km	MPC · JPL
698929	2019 AB_{78}	—	March 20, 2015	Haleakala	Pan-STARRS 1	AGN	780 m	MPC · JPL
698930	2019 AG_{79}	—	January 8, 2019	Haleakala	Pan-STARRS 1	·	1.5 km	MPC · JPL
698931	2019 AH_{80}	—	January 7, 2019	Haleakala	Pan-STARRS 1	MAR	720 m	MPC · JPL
698932	2019 AB_{83}	—	January 8, 2019	Haleakala	Pan-STARRS 1	·	890 m	MPC · JPL
698933	2019 AZ_{83}	—	January 8, 2019	Haleakala	Pan-STARRS 1	·	2.1 km	MPC · JPL
698934	2019 AO_{84}	—	May 11, 2015	Mount Lemmon	Mount Lemmon Survey	·	1.4 km	MPC · JPL
698935	2019 AU_{86}	—	August 31, 2017	Haleakala	Pan-STARRS 1	·	1.1 km	MPC · JPL
698936	2019 AV_{86}	—	November 26, 2014	Haleakala	Pan-STARRS 1	SUL	1.4 km	MPC · JPL
698937	2019 AZ_{86}	—	January 11, 2019	Haleakala	Pan-STARRS 1	EUN	880 m	MPC · JPL
698938	2019 AC_{88}	—	January 8, 2019	Haleakala	Pan-STARRS 1	EOS	1.4 km	MPC · JPL
698939	2019 AO_{89}	—	January 15, 2019	Haleakala	Pan-STARRS 1	EOS	1.4 km	MPC · JPL
698940	2019 AW_{90}	—	March 16, 2012	Haleakala	Pan-STARRS 1	·	990 m	MPC · JPL
698941	2019 AR_{92}	—	January 15, 2019	Haleakala	Pan-STARRS 2	·	1.8 km	MPC · JPL
698942	2019 AP_{96}	—	November 10, 2017	Haleakala	Pan-STARRS 1	·	1.7 km	MPC · JPL
698943	2019 AU_{97}	—	January 3, 2019	Haleakala	Pan-STARRS 1	·	1.9 km	MPC · JPL
698944	2019 AW_{99}	—	January 2, 2019	Haleakala	Pan-STARRS 1	RAF	750 m	MPC · JPL
698945	2019 AH_{113}	—	January 11, 2019	Mount Lemmon	Mount Lemmon Survey	·	1.5 km	MPC · JPL
698946	2019 AU_{133}	—	June 3, 2011	Mount Lemmon	Mount Lemmon Survey	·	1.6 km	MPC · JPL
698947	2019 BP_{5}	—	June 15, 2015	Mount Lemmon	Mount Lemmon Survey	·	3.0 km	MPC · JPL
698948	2019 BW_{5}	—	April 24, 2006	Kitt Peak	Spacewatch	·	1.7 km	MPC · JPL
698949	2019 BO_{7}	—	October 25, 2005	Kitt Peak	Spacewatch	·	1.1 km	MPC · JPL
698950	2019 BM_{8}	—	September 14, 2013	Haleakala	Pan-STARRS 1	·	1.0 km	MPC · JPL
698951	2019 BK_{9}	—	January 16, 2019	Haleakala	Pan-STARRS 1	BRA	1.1 km	MPC · JPL
698952	2019 CP_{6}	—	October 23, 2008	Mount Lemmon	Mount Lemmon Survey	·	1.6 km	MPC · JPL
698953	2019 CE_{7}	—	October 29, 2014	Haleakala	Pan-STARRS 1	·	690 m	MPC · JPL
698954	2019 CO_{7}	—	March 2, 2012	Kitt Peak	Spacewatch	NYS	1.1 km	MPC · JPL
698955	2019 CW_{7}	—	August 8, 2016	Haleakala	Pan-STARRS 1	·	1.4 km	MPC · JPL
698956	2019 CA_{8}	—	December 19, 2009	Mount Lemmon	Mount Lemmon Survey	·	1.1 km	MPC · JPL
698957	2019 CU_{9}	—	May 8, 2011	Mount Lemmon	Mount Lemmon Survey	·	1.5 km	MPC · JPL
698958	2019 CZ_{9}	—	January 6, 2006	Kitt Peak	Spacewatch	EUN	900 m	MPC · JPL
698959	2019 CQ_{10}	—	September 18, 2012	Mount Lemmon	Mount Lemmon Survey	ADE	2.0 km	MPC · JPL
698960	2019 CY_{10}	—	December 21, 2005	Kitt Peak	Spacewatch	·	1.2 km	MPC · JPL
698961	2019 CN_{13}	—	February 4, 2019	Haleakala	Pan-STARRS 1	·	1.3 km	MPC · JPL
698962	2019 CE_{14}	—	February 4, 2019	Haleakala	Pan-STARRS 1	·	1.4 km	MPC · JPL
698963	2019 CH_{14}	—	February 5, 2019	Haleakala	Pan-STARRS 1	·	1.5 km	MPC · JPL
698964	2019 CW_{14}	—	April 18, 2015	Cerro Tololo	DECam	·	1.2 km	MPC · JPL
698965	2019 CC_{16}	—	February 4, 2019	Haleakala	Pan-STARRS 1	·	1.3 km	MPC · JPL
698966	2019 CT_{17}	—	February 4, 2019	Haleakala	Pan-STARRS 2	HNS	820 m	MPC · JPL
698967	2019 CU_{17}	—	April 18, 2015	Cerro Tololo	DECam	·	1.2 km	MPC · JPL
698968	2019 CH_{19}	—	February 4, 2019	Haleakala	Pan-STARRS 1	(17392)	1.2 km	MPC · JPL
698969	2019 CV_{19}	—	April 19, 2015	Cerro Tololo	DECam	·	1.1 km	MPC · JPL
698970	2019 CJ_{21}	—	May 20, 2015	Cerro Tololo	DECam	·	1.2 km	MPC · JPL
698971	2019 CP_{21}	—	April 18, 2015	Cerro Tololo	DECam	·	1.2 km	MPC · JPL
698972	2019 DN_{2}	—	April 27, 2009	Kitt Peak	Spacewatch	·	1.2 km	MPC · JPL
698973	2019 DK_{4}	—	February 26, 2019	Mount Lemmon	Mount Lemmon Survey	·	1.4 km	MPC · JPL
698974	2019 DP_{4}	—	February 28, 2019	Mount Lemmon	Mount Lemmon Survey	·	1.6 km	MPC · JPL
698975	2019 DV_{4}	—	May 18, 2015	Haleakala	Pan-STARRS 1	·	1.4 km	MPC · JPL
698976	2019 DB_{5}	—	February 28, 2019	Mount Lemmon	Mount Lemmon Survey	·	1.5 km	MPC · JPL
698977	2019 ES_{4}	—	March 15, 2019	Mount Lemmon	Mount Lemmon Survey	GEF	860 m	MPC · JPL
698978	2019 EZ_{6}	—	March 4, 2019	Mount Lemmon	Mount Lemmon Survey	·	1.6 km	MPC · JPL
698979	2019 FK_{3}	—	October 23, 2004	Kitt Peak	Spacewatch	·	850 m	MPC · JPL
698980	2019 FX_{3}	—	October 9, 2012	Mount Lemmon	Mount Lemmon Survey	L5	8.4 km	MPC · JPL
698981	2019 FB_{6}	—	March 31, 2014	Mount Lemmon	Mount Lemmon Survey	·	1.4 km	MPC · JPL
698982	2019 FE_{12}	—	May 8, 2014	Haleakala	Pan-STARRS 1	·	1.7 km	MPC · JPL
698983	2019 FD_{15}	—	March 29, 2019	Mount Lemmon	Mount Lemmon Survey	·	2.0 km	MPC · JPL
698984	2019 FF_{15}	—	March 31, 2019	Mount Lemmon	Mount Lemmon Survey	·	2.0 km	MPC · JPL
698985	2019 FR_{15}	—	April 24, 2014	Mount Lemmon	Mount Lemmon Survey	·	1.5 km	MPC · JPL
698986	2019 FW_{15}	—	March 29, 2019	Mount Lemmon	Mount Lemmon Survey	·	1.6 km	MPC · JPL
698987	2019 FD_{16}	—	March 31, 2019	Mount Lemmon	Mount Lemmon Survey	·	1.5 km	MPC · JPL
698988	2019 FE_{16}	—	March 26, 2019	XuYi	PMO NEO Survey Program	H	320 m	MPC · JPL
698989	2019 FF_{16}	—	March 29, 2019	Mount Lemmon	Mount Lemmon Survey	·	1.4 km	MPC · JPL
698990	2019 FG_{16}	—	March 29, 2019	Mount Lemmon	Mount Lemmon Survey	·	1.4 km	MPC · JPL
698991	2019 FL_{16}	—	March 29, 2019	Mount Lemmon	Mount Lemmon Survey	·	1.4 km	MPC · JPL
698992	2019 FQ_{16}	—	March 31, 2019	Mount Lemmon	Mount Lemmon Survey	·	1.5 km	MPC · JPL
698993	2019 FW_{16}	—	March 29, 2019	Mount Lemmon	Mount Lemmon Survey	AGN	900 m	MPC · JPL
698994	2019 FF_{17}	—	March 29, 2019	Mount Lemmon	Mount Lemmon Survey	·	1.3 km	MPC · JPL
698995	2019 FK_{18}	—	March 29, 2019	Mount Lemmon	Mount Lemmon Survey	·	1.4 km	MPC · JPL
698996	2019 FD_{21}	—	March 29, 2019	Mount Lemmon	Mount Lemmon Survey	MRX	890 m	MPC · JPL
698997	2019 FM_{21}	—	March 31, 2019	Mount Lemmon	Mount Lemmon Survey	·	1.6 km	MPC · JPL
698998	2019 FH_{22}	—	March 29, 2019	Catalina	CSS	·	1.5 km	MPC · JPL
698999	2019 FL_{24}	—	February 26, 2014	Haleakala	Pan-STARRS 1	·	1.5 km	MPC · JPL
699000	2019 FL_{25}	—	March 29, 2019	Mount Lemmon	Mount Lemmon Survey	KOR	1.2 km	MPC · JPL

back to top

== Meaning of names ==
As minor planet discoveries are confirmed, they are given a permanent number by the IAU's Minor Planet Center (MPC), and the discoverers can then submit names for them, following the IAU's naming conventions. The list below concerns those minor planets in the specified number-range that have received names, and explains the meanings of those names.

Official naming citations of newly named small Solar System bodies are approved and published in a bulletin by IAU's Working Group for Small Bodies Nomenclature (WGSBN). Before May 2021, citations were published in MPC's Minor Planet Circulars for many decades. Recent citations can also be found on the JPL Small-Body Database (SBDB). Until his death in 2016, German astronomer Lutz D. Schmadel compiled these citations into the Dictionary of Minor Planet Names (DMP) and regularly updated the collection.

Based on Paul Herget's The Names of the Minor Planets, Schmadel also researched the unclear origin of numerous asteroids, most of which had been named prior to World War II. This article incorporates text from this source, which is in the public domain: SBDB New namings may only be added to this list below after official publication as the preannouncement of names is condemned. The WGSBN publishes a comprehensive guideline for the naming rules of non-cometary small Solar System bodies.

Named minor planet	Provisional	This minor planet was named for...	Ref · Catalog
698372 Zhangmi	2017 XT_{95}	Zhang Mi, Chinese amateur astronomer.	IAU · 698372
698609 Angli	2018 EQ_{13}	Li Ang (b. 1983), a Chinese amateur astronomer.	IAU · 698609
698847 Zhangguimin	2018 VR_{154}	Zhang Guimin, pharmaceutical expert and a leading figure in chiral pharmaceutical engineering in China.	IAU · 698847
