= List of minor planets: 694001–695000 =

The following is a partial list of minor planets, running from minor-planet number 694001 through 695000, inclusive. The primary data for this and other partial lists is based on JPL's "Small-Body Orbital Elements" and data available from the Minor Planet Center. Critical list information is also provided by the MPC, unless otherwise specified from Lowell Observatory. A detailed description of the table's columns and additional sources are given on the main page including a complete list of every page in this series, and a statistical break-up on the dynamical classification of minor planets.

Also see the summary list of all named bodies in numerical and alphabetical order, and the corresponding naming citations for the number range of this particular list. New namings may only be added to this list after official publication, as the preannouncement of names is condemned by the Working Group for Small Bodies Nomenclature of the International Astronomical Union.

Near-Earth obj.	MBA (inner)	MBA (outer)	Centaur
Mars-crosser	MBA (middle)	Jupiter trojan	Trans-Neptunian obj.
Unclassified

== 694001–694100 ==
Designation			Discovery			Properties		Ref
Permanent	Provisional	Named after	Date	Site	Discoverer(s)	Category	Diam.	Ref
694001	2015 PC_{58}	—	June 22, 2003	Anderson Mesa	LONEOS	T_{j} (2.69)	7.6 km	MPC · JPL
694002	2015 PV_{58}	—	December 28, 2011	Mount Lemmon	Mount Lemmon Survey	·	2.0 km	MPC · JPL
694003	2015 PC_{59}	—	April 1, 2014	Mount Lemmon	Mount Lemmon Survey	WIT	980 m	MPC · JPL
694004	2015 PX_{59}	—	July 19, 2015	Haleakala	Pan-STARRS 2	EOS	1.3 km	MPC · JPL
694005	2015 PG_{60}	—	August 9, 2015	Haleakala	Pan-STARRS 1	·	2.3 km	MPC · JPL
694006	2015 PR_{60}	—	February 13, 2008	Kitt Peak	Spacewatch	·	1.5 km	MPC · JPL
694007	2015 PM_{61}	—	September 17, 2012	Mount Lemmon	Mount Lemmon Survey	·	500 m	MPC · JPL
694008	2015 PS_{61}	—	April 11, 2013	Mount Lemmon	Mount Lemmon Survey	·	2.5 km	MPC · JPL
694009	2015 PN_{62}	—	April 10, 2014	Haleakala	Pan-STARRS 1	EOS	1.4 km	MPC · JPL
694010	2015 PP_{62}	—	February 10, 2008	Kitt Peak	Spacewatch	EOS	1.4 km	MPC · JPL
694011	2015 PS_{68}	—	June 26, 2015	Haleakala	Pan-STARRS 1	KOR	970 m	MPC · JPL
694012	2015 PF_{74}	—	October 23, 2006	Kitt Peak	Spacewatch	KOR	1.1 km	MPC · JPL
694013	2015 PA_{76}	—	January 18, 2013	Mount Lemmon	Mount Lemmon Survey	EOS	1.2 km	MPC · JPL
694014	2015 PR_{76}	—	August 30, 2005	Kitt Peak	Spacewatch	·	1.6 km	MPC · JPL
694015	2015 PR_{77}	—	April 4, 2014	Haleakala	Pan-STARRS 1	·	1.5 km	MPC · JPL
694016	2015 PT_{78}	—	April 4, 2014	Kitt Peak	Spacewatch	·	1.5 km	MPC · JPL
694017	2015 PQ_{80}	—	September 23, 2011	Haleakala	Pan-STARRS 1	AGN	950 m	MPC · JPL
694018	2015 PJ_{82}	—	March 15, 2004	Kitt Peak	Spacewatch	KOR	1.2 km	MPC · JPL
694019	2015 PT_{82}	—	June 26, 2015	Haleakala	Pan-STARRS 1	·	1.6 km	MPC · JPL
694020	2015 PT_{83}	—	February 8, 2008	Kitt Peak	Spacewatch	·	650 m	MPC · JPL
694021	2015 PY_{85}	—	July 19, 2015	Haleakala	Pan-STARRS 1	·	2.1 km	MPC · JPL
694022	2015 PX_{86}	—	February 16, 2010	Mount Lemmon	Mount Lemmon Survey	·	950 m	MPC · JPL
694023	2015 PZ_{86}	—	June 26, 2015	Haleakala	Pan-STARRS 1	KOR	1.0 km	MPC · JPL
694024	2015 PL_{87}	—	January 16, 2009	Kitt Peak	Spacewatch	·	1.3 km	MPC · JPL
694025	2015 PO_{87}	—	August 10, 2015	Haleakala	Pan-STARRS 1	KOR	990 m	MPC · JPL
694026	2015 PD_{94}	—	November 2, 2007	Kitt Peak	Spacewatch	AGN	1.1 km	MPC · JPL
694027	2015 PG_{94}	—	December 23, 2012	Haleakala	Pan-STARRS 1	·	1.3 km	MPC · JPL
694028	2015 PO_{94}	—	September 12, 2007	Mount Lemmon	Mount Lemmon Survey	·	1.1 km	MPC · JPL
694029	2015 PX_{96}	—	December 27, 2006	Mount Lemmon	Mount Lemmon Survey	·	480 m	MPC · JPL
694030	2015 PW_{100}	—	August 10, 2015	Haleakala	Pan-STARRS 1	·	2.7 km	MPC · JPL
694031	2015 PC_{101}	—	August 10, 2015	Haleakala	Pan-STARRS 1	·	1.9 km	MPC · JPL
694032	2015 PY_{104}	—	June 26, 2015	Haleakala	Pan-STARRS 1	·	1.4 km	MPC · JPL
694033	2015 PD_{105}	—	January 16, 2013	Haleakala	Pan-STARRS 1	·	1.5 km	MPC · JPL
694034	2015 PA_{109}	—	October 24, 2011	Haleakala	Pan-STARRS 1	KOR	1.1 km	MPC · JPL
694035	2015 PK_{114}	—	August 10, 2015	Haleakala	Pan-STARRS 1	·	1.4 km	MPC · JPL
694036	2015 PG_{120}	—	August 8, 2005	Cerro Tololo	Deep Ecliptic Survey	·	1.6 km	MPC · JPL
694037	2015 PW_{124}	—	August 10, 2015	Haleakala	Pan-STARRS 1	KOR	890 m	MPC · JPL
694038	2015 PC_{128}	—	July 25, 2015	Haleakala	Pan-STARRS 1	·	1.2 km	MPC · JPL
694039	2015 PW_{129}	—	January 1, 2008	Kitt Peak	Spacewatch	KOR	1.2 km	MPC · JPL
694040	2015 PS_{131}	—	February 28, 2014	Haleakala	Pan-STARRS 1	·	950 m	MPC · JPL
694041	2015 PL_{132}	—	November 2, 2007	Mount Lemmon	Mount Lemmon Survey	·	1.5 km	MPC · JPL
694042	2015 PD_{134}	—	August 10, 2015	Haleakala	Pan-STARRS 1	·	1.5 km	MPC · JPL
694043	2015 PZ_{134}	—	January 10, 2007	Kitt Peak	Spacewatch	EOS	1.6 km	MPC · JPL
694044	2015 PR_{137}	—	August 10, 2015	Haleakala	Pan-STARRS 1	·	1.3 km	MPC · JPL
694045	2015 PM_{138}	—	February 26, 2014	Haleakala	Pan-STARRS 1	·	460 m	MPC · JPL
694046	2015 PY_{142}	—	August 10, 2015	Haleakala	Pan-STARRS 1	·	490 m	MPC · JPL
694047	2015 PR_{143}	—	August 10, 2015	Haleakala	Pan-STARRS 1	·	1.3 km	MPC · JPL
694048	2015 PT_{143}	—	November 2, 2011	Mount Lemmon	Mount Lemmon Survey	·	1.9 km	MPC · JPL
694049	2015 PN_{144}	—	August 10, 2015	Haleakala	Pan-STARRS 1	·	2.2 km	MPC · JPL
694050	2015 PX_{148}	—	August 10, 2015	Haleakala	Pan-STARRS 1	·	1.6 km	MPC · JPL
694051	2015 PG_{154}	—	October 4, 2007	Kitt Peak	Spacewatch	·	1.4 km	MPC · JPL
694052	2015 PH_{154}	—	August 10, 2015	Haleakala	Pan-STARRS 1	KOR	1.2 km	MPC · JPL
694053	2015 PV_{154}	—	September 15, 2010	Kitt Peak	Spacewatch	EOS	1.5 km	MPC · JPL
694054	2015 PT_{155}	—	July 24, 2015	Haleakala	Pan-STARRS 1	·	1.5 km	MPC · JPL
694055	2015 PJ_{156}	—	July 12, 2015	Haleakala	Pan-STARRS 1	KOR	1.1 km	MPC · JPL
694056	2015 PR_{159}	—	August 9, 2005	Cerro Tololo	Deep Ecliptic Survey	EOS	1.3 km	MPC · JPL
694057	2015 PL_{160}	—	June 17, 2015	Haleakala	Pan-STARRS 1	·	2.0 km	MPC · JPL
694058	2015 PO_{160}	—	August 10, 2015	Haleakala	Pan-STARRS 1	EOS	1.5 km	MPC · JPL
694059	2015 PY_{160}	—	September 27, 2006	Mount Lemmon	Mount Lemmon Survey	·	950 m	MPC · JPL
694060	2015 PZ_{162}	—	July 24, 2015	Haleakala	Pan-STARRS 1	·	2.2 km	MPC · JPL
694061	2015 PX_{163}	—	August 26, 2000	Cerro Tololo	Deep Ecliptic Survey	·	1.6 km	MPC · JPL
694062	2015 PU_{164}	—	September 4, 2011	Haleakala	Pan-STARRS 1	·	1.4 km	MPC · JPL
694063	2015 PC_{165}	—	December 27, 2006	Mount Lemmon	Mount Lemmon Survey	·	2.3 km	MPC · JPL
694064	2015 PJ_{168}	—	February 28, 2009	Kitt Peak	Spacewatch	PAD	1.4 km	MPC · JPL
694065	2015 PQ_{169}	—	April 29, 2014	Haleakala	Pan-STARRS 1	·	2.0 km	MPC · JPL
694066	2015 PM_{172}	—	August 10, 2015	Haleakala	Pan-STARRS 1	·	550 m	MPC · JPL
694067	2015 PR_{176}	—	May 4, 2014	Haleakala	Pan-STARRS 1	·	1.6 km	MPC · JPL
694068	2015 PB_{177}	—	August 10, 2015	Haleakala	Pan-STARRS 1	·	1.8 km	MPC · JPL
694069	2015 PV_{177}	—	November 12, 2007	Mount Lemmon	Mount Lemmon Survey	HOF	2.2 km	MPC · JPL
694070	2015 PQ_{178}	—	September 23, 2011	Haleakala	Pan-STARRS 1	AGN	980 m	MPC · JPL
694071	2015 PD_{181}	—	May 23, 2014	Haleakala	Pan-STARRS 1	·	1.5 km	MPC · JPL
694072	2015 PR_{183}	—	December 12, 2006	Mount Lemmon	Mount Lemmon Survey	·	1.7 km	MPC · JPL
694073	2015 PP_{185}	—	October 30, 2007	Kitt Peak	Spacewatch	·	1.2 km	MPC · JPL
694074	2015 PK_{186}	—	August 10, 2015	Haleakala	Pan-STARRS 1	·	1.2 km	MPC · JPL
694075	2015 PQ_{186}	—	July 24, 2015	Haleakala	Pan-STARRS 1	·	2.2 km	MPC · JPL
694076	2015 PV_{187}	—	December 30, 2008	Mount Lemmon	Mount Lemmon Survey	·	780 m	MPC · JPL
694077	2015 PZ_{187}	—	April 4, 2014	Haleakala	Pan-STARRS 1	·	1.5 km	MPC · JPL
694078	2015 PW_{188}	—	October 7, 2005	Mount Lemmon	Mount Lemmon Survey	·	1.5 km	MPC · JPL
694079	2015 PA_{194}	—	April 9, 2008	Kitt Peak	Spacewatch	·	1.8 km	MPC · JPL
694080	2015 PG_{194}	—	August 10, 2015	Haleakala	Pan-STARRS 1	·	1.4 km	MPC · JPL
694081	2015 PS_{194}	—	February 3, 2012	Mount Lemmon	Mount Lemmon Survey	·	2.2 km	MPC · JPL
694082	2015 PJ_{195}	—	September 7, 2004	Kitt Peak	Spacewatch	·	2.7 km	MPC · JPL
694083	2015 PO_{196}	—	May 8, 2014	Haleakala	Pan-STARRS 1	·	1.1 km	MPC · JPL
694084	2015 PP_{196}	—	September 26, 2008	Kitt Peak	Spacewatch	V	600 m	MPC · JPL
694085	2015 PT_{200}	—	April 20, 2010	Kitt Peak	Spacewatch	·	1.2 km	MPC · JPL
694086	2015 PU_{200}	—	December 15, 2007	Mount Lemmon	Mount Lemmon Survey	·	1.5 km	MPC · JPL
694087	2015 PG_{201}	—	March 18, 2013	Mount Lemmon	Mount Lemmon Survey	·	2.1 km	MPC · JPL
694088	2015 PP_{203}	—	July 24, 2015	Haleakala	Pan-STARRS 1	EOS	1.5 km	MPC · JPL
694089	2015 PF_{206}	—	August 10, 2015	Haleakala	Pan-STARRS 1	·	1.8 km	MPC · JPL
694090	2015 PO_{206}	—	August 10, 2015	Haleakala	Pan-STARRS 1	TIR	2.2 km	MPC · JPL
694091	2015 PX_{211}	—	August 10, 2015	Haleakala	Pan-STARRS 1	·	2.1 km	MPC · JPL
694092	2015 PR_{218}	—	May 23, 2014	Haleakala	Pan-STARRS 1	·	1.3 km	MPC · JPL
694093	2015 PL_{222}	—	September 3, 2010	Mount Lemmon	Mount Lemmon Survey	EOS	1.5 km	MPC · JPL
694094	2015 PY_{231}	—	June 23, 2015	Haleakala	Pan-STARRS 1	·	1.5 km	MPC · JPL
694095	2015 PP_{233}	—	January 18, 2013	Mount Lemmon	Mount Lemmon Survey	KOR	1.0 km	MPC · JPL
694096	2015 PY_{237}	—	November 28, 2006	Mount Lemmon	Mount Lemmon Survey	EOS	1.7 km	MPC · JPL
694097	2015 PZ_{238}	—	August 10, 2015	Haleakala	Pan-STARRS 1	KOR	860 m	MPC · JPL
694098	2015 PV_{239}	—	April 29, 2014	Haleakala	Pan-STARRS 1	KOR	960 m	MPC · JPL
694099	2015 PE_{244}	—	November 9, 2009	Mount Lemmon	Mount Lemmon Survey	·	530 m	MPC · JPL
694100	2015 PO_{244}	—	June 17, 2015	Haleakala	Pan-STARRS 1	·	1.4 km	MPC · JPL

== 694101–694200 ==
back to top

Designation			Discovery			Properties		Ref
Permanent	Provisional	Named after	Date	Site	Discoverer(s)	Category	Diam.	Ref
694101	2015 PW_{245}	—	August 10, 2015	Haleakala	Pan-STARRS 1	·	1.3 km	MPC · JPL
694102	2015 PA_{246}	—	August 10, 2015	Haleakala	Pan-STARRS 1	·	1.4 km	MPC · JPL
694103	2015 PR_{247}	—	May 23, 2014	Haleakala	Pan-STARRS 1	·	2.0 km	MPC · JPL
694104	2015 PK_{248}	—	March 11, 2008	Mount Lemmon	Mount Lemmon Survey	EMA	2.0 km	MPC · JPL
694105	2015 PU_{248}	—	August 10, 2015	Haleakala	Pan-STARRS 1	·	1.7 km	MPC · JPL
694106	2015 PQ_{249}	—	January 6, 2010	Mount Lemmon	Mount Lemmon Survey	V	550 m	MPC · JPL
694107	2015 PY_{249}	—	December 29, 2011	Mount Lemmon	Mount Lemmon Survey	·	1.7 km	MPC · JPL
694108	2015 PD_{251}	—	August 10, 2015	Haleakala	Pan-STARRS 1	·	1.3 km	MPC · JPL
694109	2015 PF_{251}	—	October 1, 2000	Kitt Peak	Spacewatch	·	1.4 km	MPC · JPL
694110	2015 PX_{253}	—	November 12, 2007	Mount Lemmon	Mount Lemmon Survey	GEF	1.0 km	MPC · JPL
694111	2015 PM_{255}	—	June 18, 2015	Haleakala	Pan-STARRS 1	·	1.7 km	MPC · JPL
694112	2015 PR_{256}	—	December 8, 2012	Mount Lemmon	Mount Lemmon Survey	·	910 m	MPC · JPL
694113	2015 PQ_{257}	—	December 12, 2006	Kitt Peak	Spacewatch	·	1.8 km	MPC · JPL
694114	2015 PL_{261}	—	April 23, 2014	Cerro Tololo	DECam	KOR	960 m	MPC · JPL
694115	2015 PJ_{262}	—	December 23, 2012	Haleakala	Pan-STARRS 1	WIT	840 m	MPC · JPL
694116	2015 PY_{262}	—	August 11, 2015	Haleakala	Pan-STARRS 1	·	1.2 km	MPC · JPL
694117	2015 PF_{263}	—	October 24, 2011	Haleakala	Pan-STARRS 1	·	1.5 km	MPC · JPL
694118	2015 PL_{264}	—	January 5, 2013	Kitt Peak	Spacewatch	·	1.4 km	MPC · JPL
694119	2015 PV_{264}	—	August 11, 2015	Haleakala	Pan-STARRS 1	·	1.5 km	MPC · JPL
694120	2015 PO_{269}	—	October 23, 2011	Mount Lemmon	Mount Lemmon Survey	·	2.0 km	MPC · JPL
694121	2015 PY_{269}	—	February 9, 2013	Haleakala	Pan-STARRS 1	EOS	1.4 km	MPC · JPL
694122	2015 PK_{271}	—	August 11, 2015	Haleakala	Pan-STARRS 1	·	550 m	MPC · JPL
694123	2015 PY_{271}	—	February 8, 2007	Mount Lemmon	Mount Lemmon Survey	·	2.4 km	MPC · JPL
694124	2015 PN_{274}	—	August 11, 2015	Haleakala	Pan-STARRS 1	·	1.4 km	MPC · JPL
694125	2015 PV_{274}	—	July 24, 2015	Haleakala	Pan-STARRS 1	·	2.0 km	MPC · JPL
694126	2015 PH_{275}	—	August 11, 2015	Haleakala	Pan-STARRS 1	·	1.8 km	MPC · JPL
694127	2015 PV_{276}	—	January 14, 2012	Mount Lemmon	Mount Lemmon Survey	·	2.2 km	MPC · JPL
694128	2015 PX_{276}	—	May 6, 2014	Haleakala	Pan-STARRS 1	·	1.7 km	MPC · JPL
694129	2015 PZ_{276}	—	May 23, 2014	Haleakala	Pan-STARRS 1	EOS	1.2 km	MPC · JPL
694130	2015 PG_{277}	—	August 11, 2015	Haleakala	Pan-STARRS 1	·	1.3 km	MPC · JPL
694131	2015 PK_{277}	—	August 11, 2015	Haleakala	Pan-STARRS 1	EOS	1.3 km	MPC · JPL
694132	2015 PL_{279}	—	August 11, 2015	Haleakala	Pan-STARRS 1	·	1.9 km	MPC · JPL
694133	2015 PU_{279}	—	August 11, 2015	Haleakala	Pan-STARRS 1	·	1.9 km	MPC · JPL
694134	2015 PY_{279}	—	December 29, 2011	Kitt Peak	Spacewatch	·	2.2 km	MPC · JPL
694135	2015 PB_{283}	—	November 7, 2007	Catalina	CSS	·	1.5 km	MPC · JPL
694136	2015 PO_{283}	—	July 23, 2015	Haleakala	Pan-STARRS 2	EUP	3.4 km	MPC · JPL
694137	2015 PA_{284}	—	August 28, 2005	Anderson Mesa	LONEOS	·	1.9 km	MPC · JPL
694138	2015 PB_{284}	—	August 12, 2015	Haleakala	Pan-STARRS 1	EOS	1.7 km	MPC · JPL
694139	2015 PM_{284}	—	March 13, 2013	Palomar	Palomar Transient Factory	TRE	2.6 km	MPC · JPL
694140	2015 PV_{285}	—	May 21, 2014	Haleakala	Pan-STARRS 1	·	1.7 km	MPC · JPL
694141	2015 PS_{287}	—	October 12, 2005	Kitt Peak	Spacewatch	EOS	1.1 km	MPC · JPL
694142	2015 PK_{290}	—	August 12, 2015	Haleakala	Pan-STARRS 1	EOS	1.5 km	MPC · JPL
694143	2015 PH_{296}	—	May 22, 2014	Mount Lemmon	Mount Lemmon Survey	·	1.4 km	MPC · JPL
694144	2015 PX_{296}	—	June 2, 2014	Haleakala	Pan-STARRS 1	·	2.0 km	MPC · JPL
694145	2015 PB_{297}	—	June 25, 2001	Palomar	NEAT	AEO	1.4 km	MPC · JPL
694146	2015 PV_{297}	—	December 17, 2007	Mount Lemmon	Mount Lemmon Survey	·	1.8 km	MPC · JPL
694147	2015 PR_{298}	—	February 14, 2013	Kitt Peak	Spacewatch	·	2.3 km	MPC · JPL
694148	2015 PT_{298}	—	October 1, 2005	Kitt Peak	Spacewatch	·	1.5 km	MPC · JPL
694149	2015 PV_{298}	—	November 11, 2006	Mount Lemmon	Mount Lemmon Survey	KOR	1.5 km	MPC · JPL
694150	2015 PT_{299}	—	July 23, 2015	Haleakala	Pan-STARRS 1	·	1.9 km	MPC · JPL
694151	2015 PV_{300}	—	September 29, 2011	Kitt Peak	Spacewatch	·	1.5 km	MPC · JPL
694152	2015 PP_{301}	—	November 12, 2010	Mount Lemmon	Mount Lemmon Survey	·	2.8 km	MPC · JPL
694153	2015 PV_{302}	—	April 29, 2014	Haleakala	Pan-STARRS 1	·	1.8 km	MPC · JPL
694154	2015 PR_{303}	—	August 13, 2015	Haleakala	Pan-STARRS 1	·	1.1 km	MPC · JPL
694155	2015 PA_{305}	—	August 13, 2015	Haleakala	Pan-STARRS 1	·	2.1 km	MPC · JPL
694156	2015 PQ_{306}	—	October 11, 2012	Kitt Peak	Spacewatch	·	570 m	MPC · JPL
694157	2015 PB_{307}	—	August 13, 2002	Socorro	LINEAR	·	1.6 km	MPC · JPL
694158	2015 PD_{307}	—	July 23, 2015	Haleakala	Pan-STARRS 1	·	640 m	MPC · JPL
694159	2015 PB_{314}	—	August 12, 2015	Haleakala	Pan-STARRS 1	·	2.2 km	MPC · JPL
694160	2015 PJ_{314}	—	August 14, 2015	Haleakala	Pan-STARRS 1	·	1.3 km	MPC · JPL
694161	2015 PE_{315}	—	June 24, 2014	Haleakala	Pan-STARRS 1	·	2.7 km	MPC · JPL
694162	2015 PU_{315}	—	August 12, 2015	Haleakala	Pan-STARRS 1	·	2.4 km	MPC · JPL
694163	2015 PJ_{318}	—	January 25, 2007	Kitt Peak	Spacewatch	EOS	1.4 km	MPC · JPL
694164	2015 PD_{319}	—	April 5, 2014	Haleakala	Pan-STARRS 1	·	1.8 km	MPC · JPL
694165	2015 PJ_{319}	—	May 23, 2014	Haleakala	Pan-STARRS 1	·	960 m	MPC · JPL
694166	2015 PW_{321}	—	November 2, 2007	Kitt Peak	Spacewatch	·	1.3 km	MPC · JPL
694167	2015 PA_{323}	—	October 17, 2010	Mount Lemmon	Mount Lemmon Survey	·	2.5 km	MPC · JPL
694168	2015 PF_{323}	—	August 5, 2015	Haleakala	Pan-STARRS 1	·	550 m	MPC · JPL
694169	2015 PK_{323}	—	August 10, 2015	Haleakala	Pan-STARRS 1	·	2.0 km	MPC · JPL
694170	2015 PD_{326}	—	August 12, 2015	Haleakala	Pan-STARRS 1	·	1.5 km	MPC · JPL
694171	2015 PY_{332}	—	August 11, 2015	Haleakala	Pan-STARRS 1	ELF	2.9 km	MPC · JPL
694172	2015 PE_{334}	—	August 10, 2015	Haleakala	Pan-STARRS 2	NAE	1.6 km	MPC · JPL
694173	2015 PG_{334}	—	August 13, 2015	Kitt Peak	Spacewatch	·	1.3 km	MPC · JPL
694174	2015 PQ_{334}	—	August 12, 2015	Haleakala	Pan-STARRS 1	EOS	1.4 km	MPC · JPL
694175	2015 PX_{336}	—	August 14, 2015	Haleakala	Pan-STARRS 1	·	1.5 km	MPC · JPL
694176	2015 PA_{337}	—	August 14, 2015	Haleakala	Pan-STARRS 1	KOR	1.2 km	MPC · JPL
694177	2015 PC_{342}	—	August 10, 2015	Haleakala	Pan-STARRS 2	·	610 m	MPC · JPL
694178	2015 PR_{343}	—	August 12, 2015	Haleakala	Pan-STARRS 1	·	560 m	MPC · JPL
694179	2015 PH_{344}	—	August 14, 2015	Haleakala	Pan-STARRS 1	·	1.4 km	MPC · JPL
694180	2015 PB_{346}	—	August 14, 2015	Haleakala	Pan-STARRS 1	·	2.1 km	MPC · JPL
694181	2015 PW_{346}	—	August 14, 2015	Haleakala	Pan-STARRS 1	·	1.4 km	MPC · JPL
694182	2015 PX_{348}	—	May 3, 2008	Mount Lemmon	Mount Lemmon Survey	·	2.1 km	MPC · JPL
694183	2015 PH_{351}	—	August 14, 2015	Haleakala	Pan-STARRS 1	EOS	1.3 km	MPC · JPL
694184	2015 PR_{351}	—	August 14, 2015	Haleakala	Pan-STARRS 1	·	2.0 km	MPC · JPL
694185	2015 PC_{352}	—	August 14, 2015	Haleakala	Pan-STARRS 1	·	2.1 km	MPC · JPL
694186	2015 PX_{352}	—	August 12, 2015	Haleakala	Pan-STARRS 1	·	2.1 km	MPC · JPL
694187	2015 PE_{353}	—	August 9, 2015	Haleakala	Pan-STARRS 1	·	1.7 km	MPC · JPL
694188	2015 PM_{353}	—	August 14, 2015	Haleakala	Pan-STARRS 1	·	1.9 km	MPC · JPL
694189	2015 PL_{356}	—	August 14, 2015	Haleakala	Pan-STARRS 1	·	2.7 km	MPC · JPL
694190	2015 PR_{363}	—	August 10, 2015	Haleakala	Pan-STARRS 1	·	1.8 km	MPC · JPL
694191	2015 PA_{368}	—	August 10, 2015	Haleakala	Pan-STARRS 1	·	1.8 km	MPC · JPL
694192	2015 QB_{3}	—	July 9, 2011	Haleakala	Pan-STARRS 1	EUN	1.1 km	MPC · JPL
694193	2015 QZ_{3}	—	August 23, 2011	Haleakala	Pan-STARRS 1	·	1.3 km	MPC · JPL
694194	2015 QX_{4}	—	May 20, 2014	Haleakala	Pan-STARRS 1	·	1.5 km	MPC · JPL
694195	2015 QC_{7}	—	June 27, 2015	Haleakala	Pan-STARRS 1	·	1.3 km	MPC · JPL
694196	2015 QF_{7}	—	January 16, 2005	Mauna Kea	P. A. Wiegert, D. D. Balam	·	1.1 km	MPC · JPL
694197	2015 QF_{10}	—	August 9, 2015	Haleakala	Pan-STARRS 1	EOS	1.4 km	MPC · JPL
694198	2015 QO_{10}	—	September 19, 2006	Kitt Peak	Spacewatch	·	1.7 km	MPC · JPL
694199	2015 QM_{11}	—	November 12, 2007	Mount Lemmon	Mount Lemmon Survey	(5)	1.3 km	MPC · JPL
694200	2015 QC_{12}	—	August 21, 2015	Haleakala	Pan-STARRS 1	·	2.7 km	MPC · JPL

== 694201–694300 ==
back to top

Designation			Discovery			Properties		Ref
Permanent	Provisional	Named after	Date	Site	Discoverer(s)	Category	Diam.	Ref
694201	2015 QD_{14}	—	May 5, 2008	Mount Lemmon	Mount Lemmon Survey	·	1.9 km	MPC · JPL
694202	2015 QN_{18}	—	August 21, 2015	Haleakala	Pan-STARRS 1	·	580 m	MPC · JPL
694203	2015 QP_{18}	—	August 21, 2015	Haleakala	Pan-STARRS 1	EOS	1.5 km	MPC · JPL
694204	2015 QS_{18}	—	October 10, 2010	Mount Lemmon	Mount Lemmon Survey	EOS	1.6 km	MPC · JPL
694205	2015 QW_{18}	—	June 24, 2014	Haleakala	Pan-STARRS 1	·	2.5 km	MPC · JPL
694206	2015 QK_{19}	—	August 21, 2015	Haleakala	Pan-STARRS 1	·	2.5 km	MPC · JPL
694207	2015 QQ_{25}	—	August 21, 2015	Haleakala	Pan-STARRS 1	EOS	1.2 km	MPC · JPL
694208	2015 QX_{25}	—	August 21, 2015	Haleakala	Pan-STARRS 1	·	2.5 km	MPC · JPL
694209	2015 QY_{25}	—	August 19, 2015	Kitt Peak	Spacewatch	KOR	1.0 km	MPC · JPL
694210	2015 QZ_{25}	—	August 20, 2015	Kitt Peak	Spacewatch	·	2.1 km	MPC · JPL
694211	2015 QF_{26}	—	August 21, 2015	Haleakala	Pan-STARRS 1	VER	1.8 km	MPC · JPL
694212	2015 QG_{27}	—	August 18, 2015	Kitt Peak	Spacewatch	EOS	1.6 km	MPC · JPL
694213	2015 QG_{28}	—	August 19, 2015	Kitt Peak	Spacewatch	KOR	1.0 km	MPC · JPL
694214	2015 QV_{28}	—	August 21, 2015	Haleakala	Pan-STARRS 1	VER	2.1 km	MPC · JPL
694215	2015 QB_{32}	—	August 21, 2015	Haleakala	Pan-STARRS 1	URS	2.3 km	MPC · JPL
694216	2015 QC_{33}	—	August 21, 2015	Haleakala	Pan-STARRS 1	·	1.9 km	MPC · JPL
694217	2015 QH_{34}	—	January 20, 2012	Kitt Peak	Spacewatch	·	2.2 km	MPC · JPL
694218	2015 QE_{35}	—	July 28, 2015	Haleakala	Pan-STARRS 1	·	2.1 km	MPC · JPL
694219	2015 QT_{35}	—	August 21, 2015	Haleakala	Pan-STARRS 1	VER	2.1 km	MPC · JPL
694220	2015 QJ_{36}	—	August 21, 2015	Haleakala	Pan-STARRS 1	·	2.2 km	MPC · JPL
694221	2015 QS_{36}	—	August 21, 2015	Haleakala	Pan-STARRS 1	·	1.4 km	MPC · JPL
694222	2015 QY_{37}	—	August 21, 2015	Haleakala	Pan-STARRS 1	·	1.8 km	MPC · JPL
694223	2015 QM_{41}	—	August 21, 2015	Haleakala	Pan-STARRS 1	·	470 m	MPC · JPL
694224	2015 RS	—	December 1, 2010	Mount Lemmon	Mount Lemmon Survey	·	3.0 km	MPC · JPL
694225	2015 RY_{4}	—	August 23, 2011	Haleakala	Pan-STARRS 1	·	1.2 km	MPC · JPL
694226	2015 RF_{6}	—	February 9, 2008	Kitt Peak	Spacewatch	·	1.4 km	MPC · JPL
694227	2015 RV_{6}	—	September 18, 2012	Kitt Peak	Spacewatch	·	470 m	MPC · JPL
694228	2015 RG_{10}	—	October 22, 2011	Mount Lemmon	Mount Lemmon Survey	·	1.6 km	MPC · JPL
694229	2015 RF_{12}	—	March 2, 2009	Kitt Peak	Spacewatch	·	1.7 km	MPC · JPL
694230	2015 RN_{12}	—	April 5, 2014	Haleakala	Pan-STARRS 1	·	1.9 km	MPC · JPL
694231	2015 RN_{13}	—	June 17, 2015	Haleakala	Pan-STARRS 1	MAR	720 m	MPC · JPL
694232	2015 RJ_{15}	—	September 27, 2006	Mount Lemmon	Mount Lemmon Survey	·	1.7 km	MPC · JPL
694233	2015 RD_{16}	—	July 14, 2015	Haleakala	Pan-STARRS 1	·	1.5 km	MPC · JPL
694234	2015 RW_{19}	—	August 22, 2004	Kitt Peak	Spacewatch	·	2.2 km	MPC · JPL
694235	2015 RR_{22}	—	February 3, 2009	Kitt Peak	Spacewatch	·	1.2 km	MPC · JPL
694236	2015 RD_{26}	—	August 12, 2006	Palomar	NEAT	EUN	1.2 km	MPC · JPL
694237	2015 RK_{27}	—	August 28, 2002	Palomar	NEAT	·	1.5 km	MPC · JPL
694238	2015 RA_{29}	—	October 8, 2012	Mount Lemmon	Mount Lemmon Survey	·	570 m	MPC · JPL
694239	2015 RP_{30}	—	August 30, 2005	Kitt Peak	Spacewatch	·	660 m	MPC · JPL
694240	2015 RK_{33}	—	December 4, 2010	Kitt Peak	Spacewatch	·	2.7 km	MPC · JPL
694241	2015 RN_{33}	—	January 4, 2006	Kitt Peak	Spacewatch	·	2.4 km	MPC · JPL
694242	2015 RY_{33}	—	October 18, 2011	Haleakala	Pan-STARRS 1	MAR	960 m	MPC · JPL
694243	2015 RV_{34}	—	October 11, 2010	Kitt Peak	Spacewatch	·	2.7 km	MPC · JPL
694244	2015 RX_{38}	—	October 20, 2003	Kitt Peak	Spacewatch	·	1.3 km	MPC · JPL
694245	2015 RL_{39}	—	March 15, 2012	Mount Lemmon	Mount Lemmon Survey	·	2.1 km	MPC · JPL
694246	2015 RT_{39}	—	September 10, 2015	Haleakala	Pan-STARRS 1	·	1.7 km	MPC · JPL
694247	2015 RG_{41}	—	April 4, 2008	Catalina	CSS	·	900 m	MPC · JPL
694248	2015 RV_{41}	—	September 10, 2015	Haleakala	Pan-STARRS 1	·	470 m	MPC · JPL
694249	2015 RY_{41}	—	September 1, 2010	Mount Lemmon	Mount Lemmon Survey	·	1.7 km	MPC · JPL
694250	2015 RP_{45}	—	April 28, 2008	Kitt Peak	Spacewatch	·	580 m	MPC · JPL
694251	2015 RD_{47}	—	October 27, 2005	Mount Lemmon	Mount Lemmon Survey	·	540 m	MPC · JPL
694252	2015 RN_{47}	—	April 1, 2011	Mount Lemmon	Mount Lemmon Survey	·	560 m	MPC · JPL
694253	2015 RL_{49}	—	September 29, 2003	Kitt Peak	Spacewatch	·	1.0 km	MPC · JPL
694254	2015 RN_{50}	—	December 13, 2012	Nogales	M. Schwartz, P. R. Holvorcem	·	530 m	MPC · JPL
694255	2015 RN_{56}	—	July 17, 2004	Cerro Tololo	Deep Ecliptic Survey	·	2.1 km	MPC · JPL
694256	2015 RJ_{59}	—	March 21, 2012	Mount Lemmon	Mount Lemmon Survey	TIR	2.3 km	MPC · JPL
694257	2015 RO_{59}	—	May 21, 2010	Mount Lemmon	Mount Lemmon Survey	·	1.3 km	MPC · JPL
694258	2015 RK_{60}	—	September 18, 2006	Kitt Peak	Spacewatch	·	1.6 km	MPC · JPL
694259	2015 RU_{61}	—	September 10, 2015	Haleakala	Pan-STARRS 1	HYG	2.4 km	MPC · JPL
694260	2015 RA_{63}	—	September 10, 2015	Haleakala	Pan-STARRS 1	·	440 m	MPC · JPL
694261	2015 RV_{63}	—	October 17, 2010	Mount Lemmon	Mount Lemmon Survey	·	1.7 km	MPC · JPL
694262	2015 RW_{64}	—	January 22, 2002	Kitt Peak	Spacewatch	·	1.5 km	MPC · JPL
694263	2015 RF_{66}	—	September 10, 2015	Haleakala	Pan-STARRS 1	·	2.2 km	MPC · JPL
694264	2015 RW_{68}	—	September 16, 2006	Kitt Peak	Spacewatch	·	1.2 km	MPC · JPL
694265	2015 RL_{71}	—	January 19, 2007	Mauna Kea	P. A. Wiegert	·	1.8 km	MPC · JPL
694266	2015 RB_{74}	—	September 10, 2015	Haleakala	Pan-STARRS 1	EOS	1.4 km	MPC · JPL
694267	2015 RS_{74}	—	April 2, 2013	Mount Lemmon	Mount Lemmon Survey	VER	1.9 km	MPC · JPL
694268	2015 RU_{77}	—	September 17, 2010	Mount Lemmon	Mount Lemmon Survey	·	1.8 km	MPC · JPL
694269	2015 RE_{78}	—	November 2, 2010	Mount Lemmon	Mount Lemmon Survey	HYG	2.3 km	MPC · JPL
694270	2015 RR_{78}	—	February 18, 2013	Kitt Peak	Spacewatch	·	1.8 km	MPC · JPL
694271	2015 RC_{80}	—	November 1, 2005	Mount Lemmon	Mount Lemmon Survey	·	560 m	MPC · JPL
694272	2015 RE_{80}	—	July 22, 2004	Mauna Kea	Veillet, C.	·	2.0 km	MPC · JPL
694273	2015 RN_{80}	—	November 18, 2007	Mount Lemmon	Mount Lemmon Survey	·	1.4 km	MPC · JPL
694274	2015 RR_{81}	—	April 10, 2013	Haleakala	Pan-STARRS 1	·	2.8 km	MPC · JPL
694275	2015 RA_{82}	—	May 14, 2005	Kitt Peak	Spacewatch	·	570 m	MPC · JPL
694276	2015 RE_{87}	—	December 5, 2007	Kitt Peak	Spacewatch	·	2.2 km	MPC · JPL
694277	2015 RG_{87}	—	December 15, 2010	Mount Lemmon	Mount Lemmon Survey	·	3.3 km	MPC · JPL
694278	2015 RB_{90}	—	August 14, 2009	Dauban	C. Rinner, Kugel, F.	·	2.8 km	MPC · JPL
694279	2015 RF_{90}	—	August 21, 2004	Siding Spring	SSS	·	2.6 km	MPC · JPL
694280	2015 RC_{91}	—	September 14, 2015	Wildberg	R. Apitzsch	VER	2.2 km	MPC · JPL
694281	2015 RY_{93}	—	February 26, 2004	Kitt Peak	Deep Ecliptic Survey	·	1.3 km	MPC · JPL
694282	2015 RX_{97}	—	October 26, 2011	Haleakala	Pan-STARRS 1	NEM	1.8 km	MPC · JPL
694283	2015 RE_{98}	—	October 19, 2012	Haleakala	Pan-STARRS 1	·	500 m	MPC · JPL
694284	2015 RM_{105}	—	May 8, 2014	Haleakala	Pan-STARRS 1	·	2.1 km	MPC · JPL
694285	2015 RQ_{107}	—	August 27, 2005	Palomar	NEAT	·	570 m	MPC · JPL
694286	2015 RG_{108}	—	October 31, 2010	Catalina	CSS	·	1.9 km	MPC · JPL
694287	2015 RZ_{108}	—	August 28, 2015	Haleakala	Pan-STARRS 1	·	710 m	MPC · JPL
694288	2015 RA_{110}	—	September 9, 2015	Haleakala	Pan-STARRS 1	(895)	2.3 km	MPC · JPL
694289	2015 RS_{111}	—	March 30, 2011	Mount Lemmon	Mount Lemmon Survey	·	600 m	MPC · JPL
694290	2015 RA_{112}	—	August 17, 2006	Palomar	NEAT	·	1.6 km	MPC · JPL
694291	2015 RC_{112}	—	March 4, 2005	Kitt Peak	Spacewatch	·	990 m	MPC · JPL
694292	2015 RE_{112}	—	March 6, 2011	Mount Lemmon	Mount Lemmon Survey	·	500 m	MPC · JPL
694293	2015 RR_{112}	—	December 24, 2006	Mount Lemmon	Mount Lemmon Survey	·	550 m	MPC · JPL
694294	2015 RO_{117}	—	November 17, 2004	Siding Spring	SSS	LIX	3.5 km	MPC · JPL
694295	2015 RA_{118}	—	May 21, 2014	Haleakala	Pan-STARRS 1	·	1.9 km	MPC · JPL
694296	2015 RY_{119}	—	September 1, 2011	Siding Spring	SSS	·	1.3 km	MPC · JPL
694297	2015 RE_{122}	—	March 8, 2013	Haleakala	Pan-STARRS 1	·	1.9 km	MPC · JPL
694298	2015 RD_{125}	—	March 17, 2013	Mount Lemmon	Mount Lemmon Survey	·	2.3 km	MPC · JPL
694299	2015 RG_{126}	—	July 25, 2015	Haleakala	Pan-STARRS 1	·	2.0 km	MPC · JPL
694300	2015 RJ_{126}	—	September 9, 2015	Haleakala	Pan-STARRS 1	·	510 m	MPC · JPL

== 694301–694400 ==
back to top

Designation			Discovery			Properties		Ref
Permanent	Provisional	Named after	Date	Site	Discoverer(s)	Category	Diam.	Ref
694301	2015 RZ_{128}	—	October 25, 2012	Mount Lemmon	Mount Lemmon Survey	·	500 m	MPC · JPL
694302	2015 RW_{135}	—	September 9, 2015	Haleakala	Pan-STARRS 1	(2076)	570 m	MPC · JPL
694303	2015 RW_{137}	—	October 14, 2010	Mount Lemmon	Mount Lemmon Survey	·	1.9 km	MPC · JPL
694304	2015 RP_{141}	—	March 10, 2005	Mount Lemmon	Mount Lemmon Survey	·	1.6 km	MPC · JPL
694305	2015 RE_{143}	—	September 9, 2015	Haleakala	Pan-STARRS 1	·	2.4 km	MPC · JPL
694306	2015 RR_{147}	—	February 21, 2007	Kitt Peak	Spacewatch	·	450 m	MPC · JPL
694307	2015 RV_{147}	—	September 6, 2015	Kitt Peak	Spacewatch	·	1.2 km	MPC · JPL
694308	2015 RE_{154}	—	July 25, 2015	Haleakala	Pan-STARRS 1	·	2.5 km	MPC · JPL
694309	2015 RW_{154}	—	January 4, 2012	Mount Lemmon	Mount Lemmon Survey	·	2.2 km	MPC · JPL
694310	2015 RJ_{155}	—	February 6, 2006	Kitt Peak	Spacewatch	·	2.8 km	MPC · JPL
694311	2015 RO_{155}	—	February 23, 2007	Mount Lemmon	Mount Lemmon Survey	EOS	1.4 km	MPC · JPL
694312	2015 RE_{158}	—	January 30, 2008	Kitt Peak	Spacewatch	·	1.6 km	MPC · JPL
694313	2015 RX_{159}	—	March 15, 2013	Mount Lemmon	Mount Lemmon Survey	·	1.9 km	MPC · JPL
694314	2015 RX_{163}	—	September 4, 2015	Kitt Peak	Spacewatch	·	2.0 km	MPC · JPL
694315	2015 RN_{167}	—	February 16, 2012	Haleakala	Pan-STARRS 1	·	2.6 km	MPC · JPL
694316	2015 RR_{168}	—	February 8, 2008	Kitt Peak	Spacewatch	·	1.3 km	MPC · JPL
694317	2015 RZ_{171}	—	September 9, 2015	Haleakala	Pan-STARRS 1	·	2.0 km	MPC · JPL
694318	2015 RE_{172}	—	December 31, 2008	Kitt Peak	Spacewatch	·	1.1 km	MPC · JPL
694319	2015 RH_{172}	—	September 19, 2006	Kitt Peak	Spacewatch	HOF	2.3 km	MPC · JPL
694320	2015 RA_{173}	—	February 14, 2013	Haleakala	Pan-STARRS 1	·	1.4 km	MPC · JPL
694321	2015 RB_{173}	—	September 9, 2015	Haleakala	Pan-STARRS 1	·	1.7 km	MPC · JPL
694322	2015 RU_{173}	—	September 9, 2015	Haleakala	Pan-STARRS 1	EOS	1.4 km	MPC · JPL
694323	2015 RS_{175}	—	January 19, 2012	Mount Lemmon	Mount Lemmon Survey	THM	1.6 km	MPC · JPL
694324	2015 RY_{176}	—	September 30, 2010	Mount Lemmon	Mount Lemmon Survey	·	1.5 km	MPC · JPL
694325	2015 RD_{179}	—	March 5, 2013	Mount Lemmon	Mount Lemmon Survey	·	2.0 km	MPC · JPL
694326	2015 RS_{184}	—	March 3, 2005	Kitt Peak	Spacewatch	·	1.3 km	MPC · JPL
694327	2015 RV_{184}	—	March 19, 2013	Haleakala	Pan-STARRS 1	EOS	1.3 km	MPC · JPL
694328	2015 RQ_{185}	—	July 25, 2014	Haleakala	Pan-STARRS 1	THM	2.0 km	MPC · JPL
694329	2015 RU_{185}	—	September 21, 2009	Mount Lemmon	Mount Lemmon Survey	·	2.3 km	MPC · JPL
694330	2015 RA_{186}	—	August 28, 2015	Haleakala	Pan-STARRS 1	·	2.2 km	MPC · JPL
694331	2015 RH_{188}	—	May 20, 2014	Haleakala	Pan-STARRS 1	·	1.3 km	MPC · JPL
694332	2015 RJ_{189}	—	May 23, 2014	Haleakala	Pan-STARRS 1	URS	2.1 km	MPC · JPL
694333	2015 RN_{189}	—	December 19, 2011	Oukaïmeden	M. Ory	·	2.3 km	MPC · JPL
694334	2015 RG_{190}	—	November 5, 1996	Kitt Peak	Spacewatch	KOR	1.2 km	MPC · JPL
694335	2015 RH_{190}	—	September 18, 2010	Mount Lemmon	Mount Lemmon Survey	·	2.1 km	MPC · JPL
694336	2015 RA_{191}	—	March 1, 2008	Kitt Peak	Spacewatch	·	1.8 km	MPC · JPL
694337	2015 RJ_{191}	—	February 26, 2012	Haleakala	Pan-STARRS 1	THM	1.8 km	MPC · JPL
694338	2015 RM_{192}	—	October 12, 1999	Ondřejov	P. Pravec, P. Kušnirák	EOS	1.8 km	MPC · JPL
694339	2015 RY_{194}	—	February 12, 2000	Apache Point	SDSS Collaboration	·	680 m	MPC · JPL
694340	2015 RJ_{195}	—	October 26, 2011	Haleakala	Pan-STARRS 1	·	1.4 km	MPC · JPL
694341	2015 RG_{196}	—	February 11, 2004	Kitt Peak	Spacewatch	·	1.5 km	MPC · JPL
694342	2015 RS_{198}	—	September 5, 2010	Mount Lemmon	Mount Lemmon Survey	·	2.7 km	MPC · JPL
694343	2015 RH_{202}	—	October 20, 1999	Kitt Peak	Spacewatch	EMA	2.7 km	MPC · JPL
694344	2015 RW_{202}	—	May 22, 2001	Cerro Tololo	Deep Ecliptic Survey	·	1.5 km	MPC · JPL
694345	2015 RF_{206}	—	March 19, 2013	Haleakala	Pan-STARRS 1	·	2.3 km	MPC · JPL
694346	2015 RO_{207}	—	September 11, 2015	Haleakala	Pan-STARRS 1	·	2.1 km	MPC · JPL
694347	2015 RA_{208}	—	September 11, 2015	Haleakala	Pan-STARRS 1	·	1.9 km	MPC · JPL
694348	2015 RB_{208}	—	September 11, 2015	Haleakala	Pan-STARRS 1	·	1 km	MPC · JPL
694349	2015 RS_{208}	—	May 3, 2008	Mount Lemmon	Mount Lemmon Survey	·	2.1 km	MPC · JPL
694350	2015 RE_{209}	—	February 26, 2014	Haleakala	Pan-STARRS 1	·	520 m	MPC · JPL
694351	2015 RH_{209}	—	August 26, 2005	Palomar	NEAT	·	660 m	MPC · JPL
694352	2015 RR_{210}	—	May 16, 2005	Mount Lemmon	Mount Lemmon Survey	·	570 m	MPC · JPL
694353	2015 RE_{211}	—	April 7, 2014	Mount Lemmon	Mount Lemmon Survey	·	1.6 km	MPC · JPL
694354	2015 RH_{212}	—	August 10, 2015	Haleakala	Pan-STARRS 1	·	2.0 km	MPC · JPL
694355	2015 RU_{213}	—	September 23, 2011	Haleakala	Pan-STARRS 1	·	1.1 km	MPC · JPL
694356	2015 RE_{214}	—	January 21, 1996	Kitt Peak	Spacewatch	·	2.3 km	MPC · JPL
694357	2015 RK_{215}	—	December 21, 2006	Kitt Peak	Spacewatch	KOR	1.2 km	MPC · JPL
694358	2015 RJ_{216}	—	July 27, 2011	Haleakala	Pan-STARRS 1	·	820 m	MPC · JPL
694359	2015 RQ_{216}	—	September 11, 2015	Haleakala	Pan-STARRS 1	·	2.1 km	MPC · JPL
694360	2015 RF_{218}	—	September 15, 2006	Kitt Peak	Spacewatch	·	1.5 km	MPC · JPL
694361	2015 RJ_{219}	—	August 12, 2015	Haleakala	Pan-STARRS 1	·	2.1 km	MPC · JPL
694362	2015 RP_{219}	—	September 11, 2015	Haleakala	Pan-STARRS 1	·	2.2 km	MPC · JPL
694363	2015 RV_{219}	—	October 6, 2005	Mount Lemmon	Mount Lemmon Survey	KOR	1.3 km	MPC · JPL
694364	2015 RG_{221}	—	November 24, 2008	Kitt Peak	Spacewatch	MAS	490 m	MPC · JPL
694365	2015 RB_{223}	—	October 30, 2010	Mount Lemmon	Mount Lemmon Survey	·	1.6 km	MPC · JPL
694366	2015 RC_{223}	—	September 11, 2015	Haleakala	Pan-STARRS 1	·	490 m	MPC · JPL
694367	2015 RF_{224}	—	January 19, 2012	Haleakala	Pan-STARRS 1	·	2.3 km	MPC · JPL
694368	2015 RS_{224}	—	July 23, 2015	Haleakala	Pan-STARRS 1	·	510 m	MPC · JPL
694369	2015 RP_{225}	—	November 11, 2010	Mount Lemmon	Mount Lemmon Survey	·	2.1 km	MPC · JPL
694370	2015 RH_{226}	—	September 11, 2015	Haleakala	Pan-STARRS 1	·	570 m	MPC · JPL
694371	2015 RM_{226}	—	January 19, 2012	Haleakala	Pan-STARRS 1	·	2.3 km	MPC · JPL
694372	2015 RG_{228}	—	September 11, 2015	Haleakala	Pan-STARRS 1	·	2.3 km	MPC · JPL
694373	2015 RJ_{228}	—	April 30, 2008	Mount Lemmon	Mount Lemmon Survey	·	1.9 km	MPC · JPL
694374	2015 RC_{229}	—	May 3, 2013	Haleakala	Pan-STARRS 1	EOS	1.4 km	MPC · JPL
694375	2015 RT_{229}	—	September 12, 2004	Kitt Peak	Spacewatch	EOS	1.5 km	MPC · JPL
694376	2015 RV_{229}	—	September 5, 2010	Mount Lemmon	Mount Lemmon Survey	·	1.9 km	MPC · JPL
694377	2015 RC_{231}	—	November 25, 2005	Catalina	CSS	·	630 m	MPC · JPL
694378	2015 RZ_{231}	—	March 19, 2013	Haleakala	Pan-STARRS 1	EOS	1.4 km	MPC · JPL
694379	2015 RY_{232}	—	August 12, 2015	Haleakala	Pan-STARRS 1	·	2.1 km	MPC · JPL
694380	2015 RG_{233}	—	September 11, 2015	Haleakala	Pan-STARRS 1	·	2.2 km	MPC · JPL
694381	2015 RJ_{234}	—	July 10, 2005	Siding Spring	SSS	·	720 m	MPC · JPL
694382	2015 RU_{235}	—	February 9, 2008	Kitt Peak	Spacewatch	·	1.5 km	MPC · JPL
694383	2015 RZ_{236}	—	January 27, 2012	Kitt Peak	Spacewatch	EOS	1.5 km	MPC · JPL
694384	2015 RA_{237}	—	September 11, 2015	Haleakala	Pan-STARRS 1	VER	2.2 km	MPC · JPL
694385	2015 RF_{237}	—	September 11, 2015	Haleakala	Pan-STARRS 1	·	2.0 km	MPC · JPL
694386	2015 RQ_{237}	—	August 15, 2009	Kitt Peak	Spacewatch	·	2.1 km	MPC · JPL
694387	2015 RB_{240}	—	September 11, 2015	Haleakala	Pan-STARRS 1	·	1.9 km	MPC · JPL
694388	2015 RB_{241}	—	July 28, 2014	Haleakala	Pan-STARRS 1	·	2.2 km	MPC · JPL
694389	2015 RC_{241}	—	September 11, 2015	Haleakala	Pan-STARRS 1	·	2.5 km	MPC · JPL
694390	2015 RG_{241}	—	July 28, 2014	Haleakala	Pan-STARRS 1	VER	2.3 km	MPC · JPL
694391	2015 RO_{241}	—	October 6, 2002	Palomar	NEAT	·	1.6 km	MPC · JPL
694392	2015 RB_{242}	—	July 29, 2014	Haleakala	Pan-STARRS 1	·	2.2 km	MPC · JPL
694393	2015 RA_{244}	—	January 17, 2013	Haleakala	Pan-STARRS 1	NEM	1.8 km	MPC · JPL
694394	2015 RB_{244}	—	June 5, 2014	Haleakala	Pan-STARRS 1	·	2.0 km	MPC · JPL
694395	2015 RR_{249}	—	September 17, 2010	Mount Lemmon	Mount Lemmon Survey	·	1.6 km	MPC · JPL
694396	2015 RV_{251}	—	April 16, 2013	Cerro Tololo	DECam	EOS	1.3 km	MPC · JPL
694397	2015 RW_{252}	—	October 25, 2005	Mount Lemmon	Mount Lemmon Survey	EOS	1.4 km	MPC · JPL
694398	2015 RB_{253}	—	March 14, 2013	Mount Lemmon	Mount Lemmon Survey	·	1.3 km	MPC · JPL
694399	2015 RO_{253}	—	October 11, 2010	Mount Lemmon	Mount Lemmon Survey	·	1.4 km	MPC · JPL
694400	2015 RE_{254}	—	September 12, 2015	Haleakala	Pan-STARRS 1	·	2.2 km	MPC · JPL

== 694401–694500 ==
back to top

Designation			Discovery			Properties		Ref
Permanent	Provisional	Named after	Date	Site	Discoverer(s)	Category	Diam.	Ref
694401	2015 RX_{254}	—	February 27, 2012	Haleakala	Pan-STARRS 1	EOS	1.5 km	MPC · JPL
694402	2015 RM_{255}	—	January 11, 2008	Mount Lemmon	Mount Lemmon Survey	·	1.4 km	MPC · JPL
694403	2015 RG_{256}	—	June 28, 2014	Haleakala	Pan-STARRS 1	·	2.7 km	MPC · JPL
694404	2015 RL_{256}	—	December 29, 2005	Mount Lemmon	Mount Lemmon Survey	·	1.8 km	MPC · JPL
694405	2015 RE_{257}	—	September 9, 2015	Haleakala	Pan-STARRS 1	·	2.2 km	MPC · JPL
694406	2015 RY_{257}	—	September 12, 2015	Haleakala	Pan-STARRS 1	·	2.4 km	MPC · JPL
694407	2015 RB_{258}	—	October 26, 2011	Haleakala	Pan-STARRS 1	·	1.2 km	MPC · JPL
694408	2015 RD_{258}	—	September 9, 2015	Haleakala	Pan-STARRS 1	·	480 m	MPC · JPL
694409	2015 RJ_{258}	—	September 12, 2015	Haleakala	Pan-STARRS 1	V	410 m	MPC · JPL
694410	2015 RA_{259}	—	September 9, 2015	Haleakala	Pan-STARRS 1	ELF	3.3 km	MPC · JPL
694411	2015 RS_{259}	—	July 28, 2014	Haleakala	Pan-STARRS 1	·	2.3 km	MPC · JPL
694412	2015 RV_{259}	—	November 11, 2010	Mount Lemmon	Mount Lemmon Survey	·	1.9 km	MPC · JPL
694413	2015 RD_{260}	—	October 29, 2005	Kitt Peak	Spacewatch	·	1.3 km	MPC · JPL
694414	2015 RU_{260}	—	September 12, 2015	Haleakala	Pan-STARRS 1	·	1.3 km	MPC · JPL
694415	2015 RA_{261}	—	January 14, 2012	Mount Lemmon	Mount Lemmon Survey	·	2.1 km	MPC · JPL
694416	2015 RC_{261}	—	February 25, 2007	Mount Lemmon	Mount Lemmon Survey	·	1.8 km	MPC · JPL
694417	2015 RD_{261}	—	April 9, 2002	Kitt Peak	Spacewatch	·	2.4 km	MPC · JPL
694418	2015 RJ_{261}	—	September 29, 2009	Mount Lemmon	Mount Lemmon Survey	·	2.5 km	MPC · JPL
694419	2015 RT_{261}	—	November 4, 2010	Mount Lemmon	Mount Lemmon Survey	·	2.7 km	MPC · JPL
694420	2015 RQ_{262}	—	April 1, 2003	Apache Point	SDSS Collaboration	·	2.4 km	MPC · JPL
694421	2015 RV_{262}	—	September 10, 2004	Kitt Peak	Spacewatch	VER	2.4 km	MPC · JPL
694422	2015 RH_{263}	—	September 18, 2006	Kitt Peak	Spacewatch	·	1.6 km	MPC · JPL
694423	2015 RJ_{264}	—	April 30, 2014	Haleakala	Pan-STARRS 1	THM	1.7 km	MPC · JPL
694424	2015 RT_{264}	—	March 28, 2008	Mount Lemmon	Mount Lemmon Survey	·	1.3 km	MPC · JPL
694425	2015 RF_{266}	—	August 20, 2001	Cerro Tololo	Deep Ecliptic Survey	·	1.4 km	MPC · JPL
694426	2015 RW_{267}	—	September 21, 2009	Kitt Peak	Spacewatch	·	2.4 km	MPC · JPL
694427	2015 RG_{268}	—	September 10, 2004	Kitt Peak	Spacewatch	HYG	2.0 km	MPC · JPL
694428	2015 RL_{268}	—	November 14, 2010	Mount Lemmon	Mount Lemmon Survey	·	1.1 km	MPC · JPL
694429	2015 RN_{268}	—	September 18, 2009	Kitt Peak	Spacewatch	·	2.7 km	MPC · JPL
694430	2015 RF_{269}	—	September 10, 2015	Haleakala	Pan-STARRS 1	·	1.8 km	MPC · JPL
694431	2015 RY_{270}	—	March 5, 2013	Haleakala	Pan-STARRS 1	·	1.7 km	MPC · JPL
694432	2015 RB_{271}	—	January 29, 2012	Mount Lemmon	Mount Lemmon Survey	·	2.2 km	MPC · JPL
694433	2015 RG_{272}	—	March 31, 2013	Mount Lemmon	Mount Lemmon Survey	·	1.9 km	MPC · JPL
694434	2015 RC_{273}	—	July 1, 2014	Haleakala	Pan-STARRS 1	·	2.1 km	MPC · JPL
694435	2015 RX_{273}	—	September 12, 2015	Haleakala	Pan-STARRS 1	·	1.9 km	MPC · JPL
694436	2015 RA_{274}	—	September 12, 2015	Haleakala	Pan-STARRS 1	·	2.3 km	MPC · JPL
694437	2015 RQ_{274}	—	March 19, 2013	Haleakala	Pan-STARRS 1	·	2.5 km	MPC · JPL
694438	2015 RA_{275}	—	September 12, 2015	Haleakala	Pan-STARRS 1	EOS	1.4 km	MPC · JPL
694439	2015 RF_{276}	—	March 31, 2008	Kitt Peak	Spacewatch	·	1.9 km	MPC · JPL
694440	2015 RM_{276}	—	September 12, 2015	Haleakala	Pan-STARRS 1	VER	2.0 km	MPC · JPL
694441	2015 RT_{276}	—	May 12, 2013	Haleakala	Pan-STARRS 1	VER	2.1 km	MPC · JPL
694442	2015 RM_{277}	—	October 19, 2007	Kitt Peak	Spacewatch	(5)	960 m	MPC · JPL
694443	2015 RU_{282}	—	September 12, 2015	Haleakala	Pan-STARRS 1	·	1.9 km	MPC · JPL
694444	2015 RJ_{283}	—	September 9, 2015	Haleakala	Pan-STARRS 1	·	2.1 km	MPC · JPL
694445	2015 RR_{283}	—	September 9, 2015	Haleakala	Pan-STARRS 1	·	560 m	MPC · JPL
694446	2015 RE_{290}	—	September 10, 2015	Haleakala	Pan-STARRS 1	·	1.3 km	MPC · JPL
694447	2015 RA_{296}	—	September 10, 2015	Haleakala	Pan-STARRS 1	·	2.0 km	MPC · JPL
694448	2015 RP_{301}	—	September 9, 2015	Haleakala	Pan-STARRS 1	EOS	1.4 km	MPC · JPL
694449	2015 RQ_{301}	—	September 9, 2015	Haleakala	Pan-STARRS 1	·	1.3 km	MPC · JPL
694450	2015 RC_{302}	—	September 12, 2015	Haleakala	Pan-STARRS 1	·	2.2 km	MPC · JPL
694451	2015 RF_{304}	—	September 30, 2010	Mount Lemmon	Mount Lemmon Survey	·	1.6 km	MPC · JPL
694452	2015 RL_{304}	—	September 11, 2015	Haleakala	Pan-STARRS 1	·	2.0 km	MPC · JPL
694453	2015 RM_{304}	—	September 9, 2015	Haleakala	Pan-STARRS 1	·	1.4 km	MPC · JPL
694454	2015 RN_{304}	—	September 9, 2015	Haleakala	Pan-STARRS 1	EOS	1.5 km	MPC · JPL
694455	2015 RT_{305}	—	September 12, 2015	Haleakala	Pan-STARRS 1	·	530 m	MPC · JPL
694456	2015 RW_{305}	—	September 12, 2015	Haleakala	Pan-STARRS 1	·	450 m	MPC · JPL
694457	2015 RO_{306}	—	September 8, 2015	Haleakala	Pan-STARRS 1	·	2.3 km	MPC · JPL
694458	2015 RY_{307}	—	September 12, 2015	Haleakala	Pan-STARRS 1	·	2.0 km	MPC · JPL
694459	2015 RZ_{307}	—	September 6, 2015	Kitt Peak	Spacewatch	·	1.7 km	MPC · JPL
694460	2015 RL_{309}	—	September 11, 2015	Haleakala	Pan-STARRS 1	·	1.9 km	MPC · JPL
694461	2015 RP_{309}	—	September 9, 2015	Haleakala	Pan-STARRS 1	EOS	1.4 km	MPC · JPL
694462	2015 RQ_{309}	—	September 10, 2015	Haleakala	Pan-STARRS 1	·	510 m	MPC · JPL
694463	2015 RR_{309}	—	September 9, 2015	Haleakala	Pan-STARRS 1	EOS	1.7 km	MPC · JPL
694464	2015 RW_{309}	—	September 11, 2015	Haleakala	Pan-STARRS 1	·	1.3 km	MPC · JPL
694465	2015 RA_{310}	—	March 12, 2007	Catalina	CSS	LIX	2.9 km	MPC · JPL
694466	2015 RD_{310}	—	October 29, 2010	Mount Lemmon	Mount Lemmon Survey	VER	2.0 km	MPC · JPL
694467	2015 RQ_{310}	—	September 10, 2015	Haleakala	Pan-STARRS 1	·	1.9 km	MPC · JPL
694468	2015 RS_{310}	—	September 9, 2015	Haleakala	Pan-STARRS 1	EOS	1.3 km	MPC · JPL
694469	2015 RF_{315}	—	September 12, 2015	Haleakala	Pan-STARRS 1	·	2.5 km	MPC · JPL
694470	2015 RH_{315}	—	September 12, 2015	Haleakala	Pan-STARRS 1	EOS	1.5 km	MPC · JPL
694471	2015 RZ_{315}	—	September 9, 2015	Haleakala	Pan-STARRS 1	·	1.3 km	MPC · JPL
694472	2015 RN_{320}	—	September 9, 2015	Haleakala	Pan-STARRS 1	·	2.2 km	MPC · JPL
694473	2015 RT_{320}	—	September 12, 2015	Haleakala	Pan-STARRS 1	·	1.8 km	MPC · JPL
694474	2015 RX_{320}	—	September 9, 2015	Haleakala	Pan-STARRS 1	·	1.4 km	MPC · JPL
694475	2015 RQ_{321}	—	September 9, 2015	Haleakala	Pan-STARRS 1	·	1.5 km	MPC · JPL
694476	2015 RP_{322}	—	September 10, 2015	Haleakala	Pan-STARRS 1	EOS	1.2 km	MPC · JPL
694477	2015 RQ_{323}	—	September 11, 2015	Haleakala	Pan-STARRS 1	·	2.3 km	MPC · JPL
694478	2015 RZ_{326}	—	September 9, 2015	Haleakala	Pan-STARRS 1	·	1.4 km	MPC · JPL
694479	2015 RA_{329}	—	March 10, 2008	Kitt Peak	Spacewatch	EOS	1.4 km	MPC · JPL
694480	2015 RW_{330}	—	September 9, 2015	Haleakala	Pan-STARRS 1	·	820 m	MPC · JPL
694481	2015 RD_{331}	—	September 11, 2015	Haleakala	Pan-STARRS 1	·	2.1 km	MPC · JPL
694482	2015 RC_{332}	—	September 12, 2015	Kitt Peak	Spacewatch	EOS	1.4 km	MPC · JPL
694483	2015 RT_{335}	—	September 9, 2015	Haleakala	Pan-STARRS 1	·	1.3 km	MPC · JPL
694484	2015 RG_{338}	—	September 9, 2015	Haleakala	Pan-STARRS 1	·	460 m	MPC · JPL
694485	2015 RK_{339}	—	September 12, 2015	Haleakala	Pan-STARRS 1	EOS	1.4 km	MPC · JPL
694486	2015 RO_{340}	—	September 12, 2015	Haleakala	Pan-STARRS 1	·	1.9 km	MPC · JPL
694487	2015 RT_{340}	—	September 9, 2015	Haleakala	Pan-STARRS 1	VER	2.2 km	MPC · JPL
694488	2015 RC_{342}	—	September 9, 2015	Haleakala	Pan-STARRS 1	·	2.2 km	MPC · JPL
694489	2015 RU_{342}	—	September 12, 2015	Haleakala	Pan-STARRS 1	·	2.2 km	MPC · JPL
694490	2015 RH_{343}	—	September 9, 2015	Haleakala	Pan-STARRS 1	·	1.5 km	MPC · JPL
694491	2015 RE_{346}	—	September 4, 2015	Kitt Peak	Spacewatch	·	1.8 km	MPC · JPL
694492	2015 RM_{348}	—	September 9, 2015	Haleakala	Pan-STARRS 1	EOS	1.3 km	MPC · JPL
694493	2015 RC_{349}	—	September 12, 2015	Haleakala	Pan-STARRS 1	·	2.2 km	MPC · JPL
694494	2015 RD_{349}	—	September 9, 2015	Haleakala	Pan-STARRS 1	EOS	1.5 km	MPC · JPL
694495	2015 RF_{349}	—	September 6, 2015	Haleakala	Pan-STARRS 1	·	2.2 km	MPC · JPL
694496	2015 RR_{349}	—	September 6, 2015	Kitt Peak	Spacewatch	·	2.3 km	MPC · JPL
694497	2015 RZ_{349}	—	September 12, 2015	Haleakala	Pan-STARRS 1	·	2.1 km	MPC · JPL
694498	2015 RE_{351}	—	September 9, 2015	Haleakala	Pan-STARRS 1	VER	1.8 km	MPC · JPL
694499	2015 RA_{352}	—	September 12, 2015	Haleakala	Pan-STARRS 1	·	1.8 km	MPC · JPL
694500	2015 RE_{352}	—	September 12, 2015	Kitt Peak	Spacewatch	EOS	1.3 km	MPC · JPL

== 694501–694600 ==
back to top

Designation			Discovery			Properties		Ref
Permanent	Provisional	Named after	Date	Site	Discoverer(s)	Category	Diam.	Ref
694501	2015 RR_{353}	—	September 9, 2015	Haleakala	Pan-STARRS 1	·	1.5 km	MPC · JPL
694502	2015 RS_{353}	—	September 12, 2015	Haleakala	Pan-STARRS 1	·	2.0 km	MPC · JPL
694503	2015 RE_{356}	—	September 9, 2015	Haleakala	Pan-STARRS 1	·	1.3 km	MPC · JPL
694504	2015 RV_{361}	—	September 12, 2015	Haleakala	Pan-STARRS 1	·	2.2 km	MPC · JPL
694505	2015 RZ_{365}	—	September 9, 2015	Haleakala	Pan-STARRS 1	·	510 m	MPC · JPL
694506	2015 RW_{367}	—	September 9, 2015	Haleakala	Pan-STARRS 1	T_{j} (2.95)	2.5 km	MPC · JPL
694507	2015 RF_{368}	—	September 11, 2015	Haleakala	Pan-STARRS 1	·	2.2 km	MPC · JPL
694508	2015 RB_{374}	—	September 29, 2005	Mount Lemmon	Mount Lemmon Survey	·	1.2 km	MPC · JPL
694509	2015 RW_{374}	—	September 12, 2015	Haleakala	Pan-STARRS 1	·	2.0 km	MPC · JPL
694510	2015 RO_{375}	—	September 9, 2015	Haleakala	Pan-STARRS 1	V	340 m	MPC · JPL
694511	2015 RH_{381}	—	March 28, 2008	Mount Lemmon	Mount Lemmon Survey	·	1.4 km	MPC · JPL
694512	2015 RV_{383}	—	September 9, 2015	Haleakala	Pan-STARRS 1	EOS	1.2 km	MPC · JPL
694513	2015 SJ_{1}	—	November 28, 2005	Kitt Peak	Spacewatch	EOS	1.7 km	MPC · JPL
694514	2015 SX_{1}	—	September 18, 2010	Mount Lemmon	Mount Lemmon Survey	·	2.2 km	MPC · JPL
694515	2015 SQ_{5}	—	May 8, 2014	Haleakala	Pan-STARRS 1	·	660 m	MPC · JPL
694516	2015 SW_{7}	—	September 10, 2015	Haleakala	Pan-STARRS 1	·	640 m	MPC · JPL
694517	2015 SY_{10}	—	January 25, 2007	Kitt Peak	Spacewatch	·	2.1 km	MPC · JPL
694518	2015 SF_{13}	—	September 5, 2010	Mount Lemmon	Mount Lemmon Survey	·	1.4 km	MPC · JPL
694519	2015 SM_{18}	—	January 29, 1998	Kitt Peak	Spacewatch	V	880 m	MPC · JPL
694520	2015 SS_{18}	—	December 6, 2011	Haleakala	Pan-STARRS 1	·	1.6 km	MPC · JPL
694521	2015 SJ_{19}	—	April 11, 2008	Kitt Peak	Spacewatch	·	660 m	MPC · JPL
694522	2015 SL_{23}	—	October 30, 2005	Mount Lemmon	Mount Lemmon Survey	·	2.0 km	MPC · JPL
694523	2015 SN_{23}	—	October 31, 2010	Mount Lemmon	Mount Lemmon Survey	·	1.7 km	MPC · JPL
694524	2015 SP_{23}	—	June 5, 2014	Haleakala	Pan-STARRS 1	·	1.5 km	MPC · JPL
694525	2015 SS_{23}	—	September 23, 2015	Haleakala	Pan-STARRS 1	·	1.8 km	MPC · JPL
694526	2015 SA_{25}	—	September 23, 2015	Haleakala	Pan-STARRS 1	·	2.7 km	MPC · JPL
694527	2015 SK_{25}	—	June 1, 2014	Haleakala	Pan-STARRS 1	·	2.8 km	MPC · JPL
694528	2015 SQ_{25}	—	September 16, 2006	Palomar	NEAT	·	1.9 km	MPC · JPL
694529	2015 SV_{25}	—	October 10, 2010	Kitt Peak	Spacewatch	·	2.2 km	MPC · JPL
694530	2015 SA_{27}	—	November 2, 2010	Mount Lemmon	Mount Lemmon Survey	EOS	1.7 km	MPC · JPL
694531	2015 SC_{27}	—	October 13, 2010	Mount Lemmon	Mount Lemmon Survey	·	1.9 km	MPC · JPL
694532	2015 SF_{27}	—	September 23, 2015	Haleakala	Pan-STARRS 1	·	2.4 km	MPC · JPL
694533	2015 SO_{27}	—	September 23, 2015	Haleakala	Pan-STARRS 1	·	2.0 km	MPC · JPL
694534	2015 SU_{27}	—	September 23, 2015	Haleakala	Pan-STARRS 1	LIX	2.5 km	MPC · JPL
694535	2015 SO_{28}	—	September 23, 2015	Haleakala	Pan-STARRS 1	·	2.5 km	MPC · JPL
694536	2015 SQ_{28}	—	July 26, 2014	Haleakala	Pan-STARRS 1	VER	2.2 km	MPC · JPL
694537 Vîntdevară	2015 SS_{28}	Vîntdevară	August 22, 2015	La Palma	EURONEAR	·	2.5 km	MPC · JPL
694538	2015 SD_{30}	—	December 16, 2006	Mount Lemmon	Mount Lemmon Survey	·	2.0 km	MPC · JPL
694539	2015 SO_{30}	—	March 6, 2002	Palomar	NEAT	·	2.6 km	MPC · JPL
694540	2015 SR_{30}	—	April 6, 2013	Kitt Peak	Spacewatch	·	1.7 km	MPC · JPL
694541	2015 ST_{30}	—	September 23, 2015	Haleakala	Pan-STARRS 1	·	2.5 km	MPC · JPL
694542	2015 SV_{30}	—	September 23, 2015	Mount Lemmon	Mount Lemmon Survey	T_{j} (2.99)	2.5 km	MPC · JPL
694543	2015 SU_{38}	—	September 25, 2015	Mount Lemmon	Mount Lemmon Survey	·	510 m	MPC · JPL
694544	2015 SW_{38}	—	September 18, 2015	Mount Lemmon	Mount Lemmon Survey	·	440 m	MPC · JPL
694545	2015 SZ_{38}	—	September 23, 2015	Haleakala	Pan-STARRS 1	·	1.7 km	MPC · JPL
694546	2015 SD_{40}	—	September 18, 2015	Mount Lemmon	Mount Lemmon Survey	·	2.0 km	MPC · JPL
694547	2015 SJ_{40}	—	September 23, 2015	Haleakala	Pan-STARRS 1	·	2.4 km	MPC · JPL
694548	2015 SK_{40}	—	September 23, 2015	Haleakala	Pan-STARRS 1	EOS	1.8 km	MPC · JPL
694549	2015 SS_{40}	—	September 23, 2015	Haleakala	Pan-STARRS 1	·	2.3 km	MPC · JPL
694550	2015 SR_{42}	—	September 23, 2015	Haleakala	Pan-STARRS 1	·	1.6 km	MPC · JPL
694551	2015 SZ_{42}	—	September 23, 2015	Haleakala	Pan-STARRS 1	EOS	1.3 km	MPC · JPL
694552	2015 SN_{43}	—	September 23, 2015	Haleakala	Pan-STARRS 1	·	2.8 km	MPC · JPL
694553	2015 SU_{43}	—	September 23, 2015	Haleakala	Pan-STARRS 1	H	380 m	MPC · JPL
694554	2015 SQ_{46}	—	September 25, 2015	Mount Lemmon	Mount Lemmon Survey	·	1.7 km	MPC · JPL
694555	2015 SN_{50}	—	September 23, 2015	Haleakala	Pan-STARRS 1	·	2.1 km	MPC · JPL
694556	2015 SO_{50}	—	September 18, 2015	Mount Lemmon	Mount Lemmon Survey	·	2.1 km	MPC · JPL
694557	2015 SA_{51}	—	September 23, 2015	Haleakala	Pan-STARRS 1	·	2.6 km	MPC · JPL
694558	2015 SF_{51}	—	September 23, 2015	Haleakala	Pan-STARRS 1	·	2.2 km	MPC · JPL
694559	2015 SM_{52}	—	September 23, 2015	Haleakala	Pan-STARRS 1	EOS	1.2 km	MPC · JPL
694560	2015 TK_{3}	—	October 1, 2015	Mount Lemmon	Mount Lemmon Survey	·	650 m	MPC · JPL
694561	2015 TN_{3}	—	October 1, 2015	Mount Lemmon	Mount Lemmon Survey	VER	1.9 km	MPC · JPL
694562	2015 TH_{5}	—	November 13, 2002	Palomar	NEAT	·	1.8 km	MPC · JPL
694563	2015 TH_{6}	—	August 9, 2015	Haleakala	Pan-STARRS 1	·	1.5 km	MPC · JPL
694564	2015 TD_{7}	—	January 17, 2013	Haleakala	Pan-STARRS 1	·	1.9 km	MPC · JPL
694565	2015 TQ_{8}	—	February 7, 2008	Kitt Peak	Spacewatch	·	1.7 km	MPC · JPL
694566	2015 TS_{8}	—	September 12, 2015	Haleakala	Pan-STARRS 1	·	2.1 km	MPC · JPL
694567	2015 TP_{9}	—	July 25, 2015	Haleakala	Pan-STARRS 1	·	1.4 km	MPC · JPL
694568	2015 TB_{10}	—	September 12, 2015	Haleakala	Pan-STARRS 1	·	2.0 km	MPC · JPL
694569	2015 TE_{12}	—	July 28, 2015	Haleakala	Pan-STARRS 1	EOS	1.5 km	MPC · JPL
694570	2015 TJ_{13}	—	March 4, 2013	Haleakala	Pan-STARRS 1	VER	2.2 km	MPC · JPL
694571	2015 TR_{13}	—	November 29, 1999	Kitt Peak	Spacewatch	·	2.5 km	MPC · JPL
694572	2015 TS_{16}	—	May 26, 2014	Haleakala	Pan-STARRS 1	·	2.4 km	MPC · JPL
694573	2015 TC_{17}	—	December 15, 2010	Mount Lemmon	Mount Lemmon Survey	·	2.6 km	MPC · JPL
694574	2015 TP_{18}	—	May 24, 2014	Mount Lemmon	Mount Lemmon Survey	·	2.4 km	MPC · JPL
694575	2015 TM_{22}	—	September 7, 2015	XuYi	PMO NEO Survey Program	·	580 m	MPC · JPL
694576	2015 TL_{25}	—	February 19, 2007	Mount Lemmon	Mount Lemmon Survey	·	830 m	MPC · JPL
694577	2015 TU_{25}	—	October 2, 2006	Mount Lemmon	Mount Lemmon Survey	·	1.8 km	MPC · JPL
694578	2015 TX_{25}	—	September 10, 2015	Haleakala	Pan-STARRS 1	·	1.7 km	MPC · JPL
694579	2015 TY_{25}	—	October 26, 2011	Haleakala	Pan-STARRS 1	·	1.8 km	MPC · JPL
694580	2015 TQ_{26}	—	October 28, 2010	Mount Lemmon	Mount Lemmon Survey	·	1.8 km	MPC · JPL
694581	2015 TC_{27}	—	October 4, 2015	Catalina	CSS	·	550 m	MPC · JPL
694582	2015 TD_{27}	—	June 26, 2015	Haleakala	Pan-STARRS 1	·	560 m	MPC · JPL
694583	2015 TF_{28}	—	December 18, 2001	Socorro	LINEAR	·	2.2 km	MPC · JPL
694584	2015 TR_{28}	—	May 28, 2014	Mount Lemmon	Mount Lemmon Survey	EOS	1.5 km	MPC · JPL
694585	2015 TL_{31}	—	January 14, 2013	Mount Lemmon	Mount Lemmon Survey	·	950 m	MPC · JPL
694586	2015 TM_{31}	—	July 19, 2015	Haleakala	Pan-STARRS 1	·	1.8 km	MPC · JPL
694587	2015 TU_{31}	—	January 2, 2012	Kitt Peak	Spacewatch	EOS	1.4 km	MPC · JPL
694588	2015 TH_{35}	—	August 21, 2015	Haleakala	Pan-STARRS 1	EOS	1.7 km	MPC · JPL
694589	2015 TS_{35}	—	May 21, 2014	Haleakala	Pan-STARRS 1	EOS	1.7 km	MPC · JPL
694590	2015 TC_{36}	—	October 17, 2010	Mount Lemmon	Mount Lemmon Survey	VER	2.1 km	MPC · JPL
694591	2015 TJ_{37}	—	October 17, 2010	Mount Lemmon	Mount Lemmon Survey	·	2.6 km	MPC · JPL
694592	2015 TF_{41}	—	June 21, 2014	Mount Lemmon	Mount Lemmon Survey	·	1.5 km	MPC · JPL
694593	2015 TS_{41}	—	July 24, 2015	Haleakala	Pan-STARRS 1	EOS	1.2 km	MPC · JPL
694594	2015 TA_{42}	—	July 19, 2015	Haleakala	Pan-STARRS 1	EOS	1.3 km	MPC · JPL
694595	2015 TY_{42}	—	February 16, 2012	Haleakala	Pan-STARRS 1	·	2.1 km	MPC · JPL
694596	2015 TX_{43}	—	November 1, 2010	Mount Lemmon	Mount Lemmon Survey	·	1.8 km	MPC · JPL
694597	2015 TC_{45}	—	October 1, 2005	Mount Lemmon	Mount Lemmon Survey	KOR	1.4 km	MPC · JPL
694598	2015 TX_{46}	—	September 26, 2005	Kitt Peak	Spacewatch	·	1.3 km	MPC · JPL
694599	2015 TY_{46}	—	October 9, 2004	Kitt Peak	Spacewatch	VER	1.8 km	MPC · JPL
694600	2015 TB_{49}	—	August 21, 2015	Haleakala	Pan-STARRS 1	THB	2.2 km	MPC · JPL

== 694601–694700 ==
back to top

Designation			Discovery			Properties		Ref
Permanent	Provisional	Named after	Date	Site	Discoverer(s)	Category	Diam.	Ref
694601	2015 TL_{49}	—	July 28, 2015	Haleakala	Pan-STARRS 1	·	2.4 km	MPC · JPL
694602	2015 TR_{50}	—	October 20, 2011	Kitt Peak	Spacewatch	·	1.3 km	MPC · JPL
694603	2015 TN_{51}	—	July 28, 2015	Haleakala	Pan-STARRS 1	EOS	1.6 km	MPC · JPL
694604	2015 TZ_{52}	—	July 23, 2015	Haleakala	Pan-STARRS 1	·	2.0 km	MPC · JPL
694605	2015 TU_{54}	—	January 21, 2012	Kitt Peak	Spacewatch	·	2.6 km	MPC · JPL
694606	2015 TE_{58}	—	August 28, 2006	Kitt Peak	Spacewatch	·	1.3 km	MPC · JPL
694607	2015 TL_{58}	—	October 3, 2015	Mount Lemmon	Mount Lemmon Survey	·	2.1 km	MPC · JPL
694608	2015 TM_{58}	—	February 13, 2012	Haleakala	Pan-STARRS 1	·	2.4 km	MPC · JPL
694609	2015 TB_{60}	—	October 30, 2010	Piszkés-tető	K. Sárneczky, Z. Kuli	·	2.3 km	MPC · JPL
694610	2015 TZ_{61}	—	September 18, 2010	Mount Lemmon	Mount Lemmon Survey	·	1.8 km	MPC · JPL
694611	2015 TG_{65}	—	November 3, 2005	Mount Lemmon	Mount Lemmon Survey	·	490 m	MPC · JPL
694612	2015 TM_{66}	—	April 12, 2013	Haleakala	Pan-STARRS 1	EOS	1.5 km	MPC · JPL
694613	2015 TN_{70}	—	September 9, 2015	Haleakala	Pan-STARRS 1	·	2.0 km	MPC · JPL
694614	2015 TL_{71}	—	December 6, 2010	Mount Lemmon	Mount Lemmon Survey	·	2.5 km	MPC · JPL
694615	2015 TA_{75}	—	October 8, 2015	Haleakala	Pan-STARRS 1	·	920 m	MPC · JPL
694616	2015 TO_{75}	—	October 9, 1993	Kitt Peak	Spacewatch	EOS	1.7 km	MPC · JPL
694617	2015 TL_{76}	—	May 13, 2007	Mount Lemmon	Mount Lemmon Survey	·	2.2 km	MPC · JPL
694618	2015 TX_{78}	—	October 9, 2004	Kitt Peak	Spacewatch	THM	1.6 km	MPC · JPL
694619	2015 TX_{80}	—	October 8, 2015	Haleakala	Pan-STARRS 1	·	3.1 km	MPC · JPL
694620	2015 TQ_{81}	—	October 8, 2015	Haleakala	Pan-STARRS 1	·	1.7 km	MPC · JPL
694621	2015 TB_{82}	—	July 29, 2014	Haleakala	Pan-STARRS 1	·	2.4 km	MPC · JPL
694622	2015 TB_{83}	—	November 1, 2005	Mount Lemmon	Mount Lemmon Survey	·	1.5 km	MPC · JPL
694623	2015 TX_{87}	—	November 5, 2010	Kitt Peak	Spacewatch	·	1.5 km	MPC · JPL
694624	2015 TF_{88}	—	October 8, 2015	Haleakala	Pan-STARRS 1	·	500 m	MPC · JPL
694625	2015 TM_{88}	—	April 16, 2013	Haleakala	Pan-STARRS 1	·	2.2 km	MPC · JPL
694626	2015 TE_{89}	—	September 19, 2009	Mount Lemmon	Mount Lemmon Survey	·	2.3 km	MPC · JPL
694627	2015 TS_{89}	—	September 9, 2015	Haleakala	Pan-STARRS 1	·	2.3 km	MPC · JPL
694628	2015 TP_{90}	—	July 31, 2014	Haleakala	Pan-STARRS 1	·	2.3 km	MPC · JPL
694629	2015 TC_{92}	—	August 25, 2004	Kitt Peak	Spacewatch	·	640 m	MPC · JPL
694630	2015 TF_{92}	—	October 8, 2015	Haleakala	Pan-STARRS 1	·	560 m	MPC · JPL
694631	2015 TJ_{93}	—	December 10, 2010	Mount Lemmon	Mount Lemmon Survey	VER	2.1 km	MPC · JPL
694632	2015 TO_{95}	—	September 17, 2009	Kitt Peak	Spacewatch	URS	2.2 km	MPC · JPL
694633	2015 TS_{95}	—	September 17, 2004	Kitt Peak	Spacewatch	THM	1.8 km	MPC · JPL
694634	2015 TU_{97}	—	July 25, 2014	Haleakala	Pan-STARRS 1	·	2.2 km	MPC · JPL
694635	2015 TM_{98}	—	October 8, 2015	Haleakala	Pan-STARRS 1	·	2.1 km	MPC · JPL
694636	2015 TL_{100}	—	October 24, 2011	Kitt Peak	Spacewatch	·	1.2 km	MPC · JPL
694637	2015 TX_{100}	—	September 20, 2009	Kitt Peak	Spacewatch	·	2.6 km	MPC · JPL
694638	2015 TD_{103}	—	February 13, 2008	Kitt Peak	Spacewatch	·	1.5 km	MPC · JPL
694639	2015 TE_{103}	—	June 28, 2014	Haleakala	Pan-STARRS 1	·	2.5 km	MPC · JPL
694640	2015 TC_{109}	—	September 2, 2008	Kitt Peak	Spacewatch	·	3.1 km	MPC · JPL
694641	2015 TL_{111}	—	November 1, 2008	Mount Lemmon	Mount Lemmon Survey	V	480 m	MPC · JPL
694642	2015 TP_{113}	—	October 8, 2015	Haleakala	Pan-STARRS 1	·	1.3 km	MPC · JPL
694643	2015 TS_{113}	—	August 3, 2002	Palomar	NEAT	·	1.1 km	MPC · JPL
694644	2015 TZ_{114}	—	October 8, 2015	Haleakala	Pan-STARRS 1	·	790 m	MPC · JPL
694645	2015 TC_{117}	—	September 19, 2015	Haleakala	Pan-STARRS 1	·	2.4 km	MPC · JPL
694646	2015 TG_{120}	—	August 20, 2014	Haleakala	Pan-STARRS 1	·	1.8 km	MPC · JPL
694647	2015 TO_{123}	—	June 27, 2014	Haleakala	Pan-STARRS 1	VER	2.1 km	MPC · JPL
694648	2015 TV_{124}	—	October 8, 2015	Haleakala	Pan-STARRS 1	·	1.5 km	MPC · JPL
694649	2015 TM_{125}	—	December 28, 2005	Kitt Peak	Spacewatch	·	2.1 km	MPC · JPL
694650	2015 TE_{126}	—	December 24, 2005	Kitt Peak	Spacewatch	·	2.6 km	MPC · JPL
694651	2015 TC_{129}	—	May 15, 2013	Haleakala	Pan-STARRS 1	·	2.6 km	MPC · JPL
694652	2015 TG_{129}	—	April 19, 2013	Haleakala	Pan-STARRS 1	VER	2.3 km	MPC · JPL
694653	2015 TM_{129}	—	July 28, 2014	Haleakala	Pan-STARRS 1	·	2.1 km	MPC · JPL
694654	2015 TB_{130}	—	February 28, 2008	Kitt Peak	Spacewatch	·	1.4 km	MPC · JPL
694655	2015 TD_{130}	—	May 14, 2008	Mount Lemmon	Mount Lemmon Survey	·	2.5 km	MPC · JPL
694656	2015 TN_{130}	—	August 6, 2005	Palomar	NEAT	·	1.7 km	MPC · JPL
694657	2015 TU_{130}	—	October 8, 2015	Haleakala	Pan-STARRS 1	·	2.2 km	MPC · JPL
694658	2015 TV_{131}	—	August 28, 2009	Kitt Peak	Spacewatch	·	2.2 km	MPC · JPL
694659	2015 TW_{131}	—	August 12, 2015	Haleakala	Pan-STARRS 1	·	2.4 km	MPC · JPL
694660	2015 TB_{134}	—	January 30, 2006	Kitt Peak	Spacewatch	(43176)	2.5 km	MPC · JPL
694661	2015 TT_{134}	—	July 1, 2014	Haleakala	Pan-STARRS 1	·	2.5 km	MPC · JPL
694662	2015 TA_{135}	—	October 24, 2005	Mauna Kea	A. Boattini	·	2.7 km	MPC · JPL
694663	2015 TH_{135}	—	January 8, 2011	Mount Lemmon	Mount Lemmon Survey	LUT	3.3 km	MPC · JPL
694664	2015 TS_{136}	—	June 29, 2014	Haleakala	Pan-STARRS 1	·	2.4 km	MPC · JPL
694665	2015 TA_{137}	—	July 4, 2014	Haleakala	Pan-STARRS 1	·	2.5 km	MPC · JPL
694666	2015 TJ_{138}	—	September 17, 2009	Kitt Peak	Spacewatch	·	2.1 km	MPC · JPL
694667	2015 TT_{138}	—	April 10, 2013	Mount Lemmon	Mount Lemmon Survey	EOS	1.4 km	MPC · JPL
694668	2015 TF_{139}	—	October 8, 2015	Haleakala	Pan-STARRS 1	·	2.4 km	MPC · JPL
694669	2015 TW_{140}	—	October 8, 2015	Haleakala	Pan-STARRS 1	·	2.7 km	MPC · JPL
694670	2015 TW_{141}	—	August 20, 2009	Kitt Peak	Spacewatch	·	2.7 km	MPC · JPL
694671	2015 TR_{142}	—	July 29, 2014	Haleakala	Pan-STARRS 1	·	2.5 km	MPC · JPL
694672	2015 TB_{143}	—	May 8, 2008	Kitt Peak	Spacewatch	·	1.6 km	MPC · JPL
694673	2015 TC_{143}	—	May 12, 2013	Haleakala	Pan-STARRS 1	·	2.3 km	MPC · JPL
694674	2015 TJ_{146}	—	August 12, 2015	Haleakala	Pan-STARRS 1	·	620 m	MPC · JPL
694675	2015 TU_{147}	—	January 9, 2006	Kitt Peak	Spacewatch	·	2.0 km	MPC · JPL
694676	2015 TA_{150}	—	August 28, 2005	Kitt Peak	Spacewatch	·	560 m	MPC · JPL
694677	2015 TE_{152}	—	September 11, 2015	Haleakala	Pan-STARRS 1	EOS	1.6 km	MPC · JPL
694678	2015 TK_{153}	—	September 18, 2015	Mount Lemmon	Mount Lemmon Survey	·	1.6 km	MPC · JPL
694679	2015 TC_{154}	—	November 4, 2007	Kitt Peak	Spacewatch	·	1.2 km	MPC · JPL
694680	2015 TH_{156}	—	December 12, 2012	Mount Lemmon	Mount Lemmon Survey	(2076)	550 m	MPC · JPL
694681	2015 TN_{156}	—	October 16, 2006	Kitt Peak	Spacewatch	·	1.4 km	MPC · JPL
694682	2015 TF_{158}	—	February 3, 2012	Haleakala	Pan-STARRS 1	·	1.8 km	MPC · JPL
694683	2015 TS_{162}	—	January 17, 2013	Haleakala	Pan-STARRS 1	·	1.8 km	MPC · JPL
694684	2015 TU_{162}	—	September 16, 2006	Catalina	CSS	·	2.0 km	MPC · JPL
694685	2015 TB_{163}	—	April 4, 2014	Haleakala	Pan-STARRS 1	·	1.4 km	MPC · JPL
694686	2015 TN_{166}	—	April 22, 2007	Kitt Peak	Spacewatch	·	700 m	MPC · JPL
694687	2015 TW_{167}	—	September 9, 2015	Haleakala	Pan-STARRS 1	·	2.1 km	MPC · JPL
694688	2015 TX_{170}	—	April 10, 2010	Kitt Peak	Spacewatch	·	1.2 km	MPC · JPL
694689	2015 TL_{171}	—	February 24, 2012	Mount Lemmon	Mount Lemmon Survey	·	2.5 km	MPC · JPL
694690	2015 TV_{171}	—	April 7, 2013	Mount Lemmon	Mount Lemmon Survey	·	1.4 km	MPC · JPL
694691	2015 TD_{172}	—	October 9, 2015	Haleakala	Pan-STARRS 1	(2076)	590 m	MPC · JPL
694692	2015 TZ_{172}	—	October 9, 2015	Haleakala	Pan-STARRS 1	·	1.4 km	MPC · JPL
694693	2015 TP_{176}	—	July 2, 2014	Haleakala	Pan-STARRS 1	·	1.4 km	MPC · JPL
694694	2015 TK_{177}	—	April 5, 2014	Haleakala	Pan-STARRS 1	·	510 m	MPC · JPL
694695	2015 TT_{179}	—	September 9, 2015	XuYi	PMO NEO Survey Program	·	3.2 km	MPC · JPL
694696	2015 TL_{180}	—	January 5, 2013	Kitt Peak	Spacewatch	·	690 m	MPC · JPL
694697	2015 TD_{181}	—	September 2, 2010	Mount Lemmon	Mount Lemmon Survey	EOS	1.5 km	MPC · JPL
694698	2015 TZ_{181}	—	December 3, 2005	Mauna Kea	A. Boattini	·	1.6 km	MPC · JPL
694699	2015 TM_{185}	—	October 2, 2005	Mount Lemmon	Mount Lemmon Survey	·	1.6 km	MPC · JPL
694700	2015 TD_{186}	—	October 9, 2015	Haleakala	Pan-STARRS 1	·	1.6 km	MPC · JPL

== 694701–694800 ==
back to top

Designation			Discovery			Properties		Ref
Permanent	Provisional	Named after	Date	Site	Discoverer(s)	Category	Diam.	Ref
694701	2015 TL_{186}	—	June 8, 2013	Mount Lemmon	Mount Lemmon Survey	·	2.3 km	MPC · JPL
694702	2015 TK_{187}	—	August 28, 2011	Haleakala	Pan-STARRS 1	NYS	1.0 km	MPC · JPL
694703	2015 TZ_{187}	—	October 9, 2015	Haleakala	Pan-STARRS 1	·	1.3 km	MPC · JPL
694704	2015 TE_{188}	—	March 19, 2013	Haleakala	Pan-STARRS 1	·	1.5 km	MPC · JPL
694705	2015 TF_{189}	—	September 16, 2006	Catalina	CSS	·	2.2 km	MPC · JPL
694706	2015 TA_{191}	—	November 5, 2010	Mount Lemmon	Mount Lemmon Survey	·	2.6 km	MPC · JPL
694707	2015 TS_{193}	—	September 26, 2005	Kitt Peak	Spacewatch	·	690 m	MPC · JPL
694708	2015 TQ_{196}	—	July 21, 2006	Mount Lemmon	Mount Lemmon Survey	·	1.9 km	MPC · JPL
694709	2015 TZ_{198}	—	August 12, 2015	Haleakala	Pan-STARRS 1	·	600 m	MPC · JPL
694710	2015 TE_{201}	—	December 1, 2010	Mount Lemmon	Mount Lemmon Survey	·	2.4 km	MPC · JPL
694711	2015 TF_{201}	—	May 27, 2008	Mount Lemmon	Mount Lemmon Survey	·	2.9 km	MPC · JPL
694712	2015 TT_{201}	—	December 24, 2005	Kitt Peak	Spacewatch	·	2.6 km	MPC · JPL
694713	2015 TN_{203}	—	September 23, 2008	Mount Lemmon	Mount Lemmon Survey	·	680 m	MPC · JPL
694714	2015 TW_{203}	—	August 19, 2006	Kitt Peak	Spacewatch	·	1.2 km	MPC · JPL
694715	2015 TF_{206}	—	October 12, 2006	Kitt Peak	Spacewatch	AGN	980 m	MPC · JPL
694716	2015 TA_{207}	—	October 8, 2015	Haleakala	Pan-STARRS 1	ARM	2.5 km	MPC · JPL
694717	2015 TS_{207}	—	November 12, 2010	Mount Lemmon	Mount Lemmon Survey	(1118)	3.6 km	MPC · JPL
694718	2015 TV_{209}	—	October 10, 2015	Atom Site	Space Surveillance Telescope	·	2.9 km	MPC · JPL
694719	2015 TX_{211}	—	April 30, 2014	Haleakala	Pan-STARRS 1	·	1.5 km	MPC · JPL
694720	2015 TJ_{212}	—	November 1, 2010	Mount Lemmon	Mount Lemmon Survey	EOS	1.8 km	MPC · JPL
694721	2015 TL_{213}	—	October 11, 2010	Mount Lemmon	Mount Lemmon Survey	·	2.4 km	MPC · JPL
694722	2015 TJ_{214}	—	October 25, 2011	Haleakala	Pan-STARRS 1	·	1.5 km	MPC · JPL
694723	2015 TM_{214}	—	March 31, 2009	Mount Lemmon	Mount Lemmon Survey	·	1.5 km	MPC · JPL
694724	2015 TJ_{218}	—	September 18, 2015	Mount Lemmon	Mount Lemmon Survey	·	560 m	MPC · JPL
694725	2015 TU_{218}	—	September 12, 2015	Haleakala	Pan-STARRS 1	·	2.4 km	MPC · JPL
694726	2015 TY_{218}	—	May 21, 2014	Haleakala	Pan-STARRS 1	·	1.1 km	MPC · JPL
694727	2015 TM_{222}	—	September 12, 2015	Haleakala	Pan-STARRS 1	·	580 m	MPC · JPL
694728	2015 TU_{222}	—	May 3, 2008	Mount Lemmon	Mount Lemmon Survey	·	2.1 km	MPC · JPL
694729	2015 TW_{222}	—	October 12, 2010	Kitt Peak	Spacewatch	·	1.3 km	MPC · JPL
694730	2015 TD_{223}	—	October 30, 2011	Mount Lemmon	Mount Lemmon Survey	·	1.6 km	MPC · JPL
694731	2015 TX_{223}	—	January 19, 2012	Haleakala	Pan-STARRS 1	·	2.5 km	MPC · JPL
694732	2015 TR_{224}	—	September 4, 2010	Mount Lemmon	Mount Lemmon Survey	·	1.5 km	MPC · JPL
694733	2015 TA_{225}	—	October 5, 2004	Kitt Peak	Spacewatch	THM	1.7 km	MPC · JPL
694734	2015 TC_{227}	—	January 30, 2012	Mount Lemmon	Mount Lemmon Survey	·	2.5 km	MPC · JPL
694735	2015 TS_{228}	—	April 20, 2009	Catalina	CSS	·	2.1 km	MPC · JPL
694736	2015 TV_{228}	—	October 10, 2015	Haleakala	Pan-STARRS 1	·	2.6 km	MPC · JPL
694737	2015 TO_{232}	—	May 30, 2006	Mount Lemmon	Mount Lemmon Survey	·	1.2 km	MPC · JPL
694738	2015 TD_{235}	—	April 10, 2013	Haleakala	Pan-STARRS 1	·	2.5 km	MPC · JPL
694739	2015 TL_{236}	—	September 24, 2015	Mount Lemmon	Mount Lemmon Survey	·	2.2 km	MPC · JPL
694740	2015 TM_{239}	—	September 20, 2015	Catalina	CSS	·	1.9 km	MPC · JPL
694741	2015 TV_{239}	—	October 8, 2004	Socorro	LINEAR	·	2.9 km	MPC · JPL
694742	2015 TP_{241}	—	November 15, 2001	Kitt Peak	Spacewatch	·	1.8 km	MPC · JPL
694743	2015 TT_{243}	—	November 2, 2011	Mount Lemmon	Mount Lemmon Survey	·	780 m	MPC · JPL
694744	2015 TE_{246}	—	February 8, 2013	Haleakala	Pan-STARRS 1	·	1.4 km	MPC · JPL
694745	2015 TY_{246}	—	November 1, 2010	Mount Lemmon	Mount Lemmon Survey	·	1.9 km	MPC · JPL
694746	2015 TX_{250}	—	October 17, 2006	Mount Lemmon	Mount Lemmon Survey	AGN	1.1 km	MPC · JPL
694747	2015 TV_{251}	—	October 30, 2005	Catalina	CSS	·	540 m	MPC · JPL
694748	2015 TU_{252}	—	October 9, 2015	Kitt Peak	Spacewatch	·	2.1 km	MPC · JPL
694749	2015 TP_{254}	—	June 24, 2014	Haleakala	Pan-STARRS 1	·	2.3 km	MPC · JPL
694750	2015 TR_{254}	—	January 10, 2013	Kitt Peak	Spacewatch	·	540 m	MPC · JPL
694751	2015 TS_{255}	—	October 10, 2015	Palomar	Palomar Transient Factory	EUP	3.4 km	MPC · JPL
694752	2015 TJ_{256}	—	September 20, 2003	Kitt Peak	Spacewatch	·	3.0 km	MPC · JPL
694753	2015 TZ_{256}	—	April 11, 2008	Kitt Peak	Spacewatch	·	2.0 km	MPC · JPL
694754	2015 TF_{258}	—	January 19, 2012	Kitt Peak	Spacewatch	·	2.1 km	MPC · JPL
694755	2015 TK_{259}	—	July 25, 2015	Haleakala	Pan-STARRS 1	·	2.4 km	MPC · JPL
694756	2015 TO_{259}	—	September 25, 2015	Mount Lemmon	Mount Lemmon Survey	HYG	2.3 km	MPC · JPL
694757	2015 TV_{259}	—	April 29, 2008	Kitt Peak	Spacewatch	EOS	1.6 km	MPC · JPL
694758	2015 TK_{261}	—	November 2, 2010	Mount Lemmon	Mount Lemmon Survey	·	2.4 km	MPC · JPL
694759	2015 TQ_{262}	—	October 12, 2015	Haleakala	Pan-STARRS 1	·	2.5 km	MPC · JPL
694760	2015 TS_{265}	—	October 12, 2015	Haleakala	Pan-STARRS 1	·	1.9 km	MPC · JPL
694761	2015 TB_{268}	—	October 3, 2015	Mount Lemmon	Mount Lemmon Survey	·	2.0 km	MPC · JPL
694762	2015 TP_{268}	—	October 12, 2015	Haleakala	Pan-STARRS 1	·	2.4 km	MPC · JPL
694763	2015 TU_{268}	—	October 12, 2015	Haleakala	Pan-STARRS 1	·	2.8 km	MPC · JPL
694764	2015 TG_{269}	—	November 1, 2010	Mount Lemmon	Mount Lemmon Survey	·	1.9 km	MPC · JPL
694765	2015 TP_{269}	—	December 24, 2005	Kitt Peak	Spacewatch	·	2.4 km	MPC · JPL
694766	2015 TJ_{271}	—	April 6, 2008	Kitt Peak	Spacewatch	·	1.6 km	MPC · JPL
694767	2015 TD_{277}	—	September 12, 2015	Haleakala	Pan-STARRS 1	·	2.1 km	MPC · JPL
694768	2015 TW_{279}	—	September 1, 2005	Campo Imperatore	CINEOS	·	630 m	MPC · JPL
694769	2015 TL_{280}	—	October 3, 2015	Mount Lemmon	Mount Lemmon Survey	·	450 m	MPC · JPL
694770	2015 TT_{280}	—	March 16, 2007	Kitt Peak	Spacewatch	TIR	2.2 km	MPC · JPL
694771	2015 TK_{282}	—	December 31, 2002	Kitt Peak	Spacewatch	·	1.6 km	MPC · JPL
694772	2015 TA_{289}	—	November 20, 2006	Kitt Peak	Spacewatch	KOR	1.2 km	MPC · JPL
694773	2015 TF_{290}	—	October 24, 2011	Haleakala	Pan-STARRS 1	·	1.3 km	MPC · JPL
694774	2015 TM_{290}	—	July 25, 2015	Haleakala	Pan-STARRS 1	·	2.1 km	MPC · JPL
694775	2015 TN_{290}	—	August 3, 2015	Haleakala	Pan-STARRS 1	·	3.0 km	MPC · JPL
694776	2015 TD_{291}	—	October 4, 2015	Catalina	CSS	EUP	2.7 km	MPC · JPL
694777	2015 TY_{294}	—	October 28, 2006	Mount Lemmon	Mount Lemmon Survey	AST	1.4 km	MPC · JPL
694778	2015 TG_{296}	—	September 20, 2011	Kitt Peak	Spacewatch	·	910 m	MPC · JPL
694779	2015 TL_{296}	—	September 19, 2001	Kitt Peak	Spacewatch	·	580 m	MPC · JPL
694780	2015 TS_{296}	—	September 12, 2015	Haleakala	Pan-STARRS 1	·	1.7 km	MPC · JPL
694781	2015 TH_{299}	—	November 1, 2010	Mount Lemmon	Mount Lemmon Survey	EOS	1.3 km	MPC · JPL
694782	2015 TM_{300}	—	October 12, 2015	Atom Site	Space Surveillance Telescope	·	2.7 km	MPC · JPL
694783	2015 TE_{301}	—	November 1, 2010	Piszkés-tető	K. Sárneczky, Z. Kuli	·	2.7 km	MPC · JPL
694784	2015 TR_{301}	—	June 2, 2014	Haleakala	Pan-STARRS 1	·	1.7 km	MPC · JPL
694785	2015 TA_{302}	—	October 28, 2008	Mount Lemmon	Mount Lemmon Survey	·	720 m	MPC · JPL
694786	2015 TD_{305}	—	September 23, 2015	Haleakala	Pan-STARRS 1	EOS	1.6 km	MPC · JPL
694787	2015 TJ_{305}	—	August 21, 2015	Haleakala	Pan-STARRS 1	·	2.9 km	MPC · JPL
694788	2015 TR_{305}	—	January 15, 2013	Nogales	M. Schwartz, P. R. Holvorcem	·	920 m	MPC · JPL
694789	2015 TS_{305}	—	July 27, 2014	Haleakala	Pan-STARRS 1	·	2.2 km	MPC · JPL
694790	2015 TG_{306}	—	October 12, 2015	Haleakala	Pan-STARRS 1	·	2.4 km	MPC · JPL
694791	2015 TK_{306}	—	December 1, 2010	Mount Lemmon	Mount Lemmon Survey	·	2.2 km	MPC · JPL
694792	2015 TA_{309}	—	January 26, 2012	Mount Lemmon	Mount Lemmon Survey	·	2.3 km	MPC · JPL
694793	2015 TR_{310}	—	May 29, 2008	Mount Lemmon	Mount Lemmon Survey	·	4.0 km	MPC · JPL
694794	2015 TB_{311}	—	January 13, 2008	Kitt Peak	Spacewatch	·	2.3 km	MPC · JPL
694795	2015 TV_{311}	—	May 28, 2008	Kitt Peak	Spacewatch	·	2.8 km	MPC · JPL
694796	2015 TH_{312}	—	June 24, 2009	Mount Lemmon	Mount Lemmon Survey	·	2.4 km	MPC · JPL
694797	2015 TZ_{312}	—	October 13, 2015	Mount Lemmon	Mount Lemmon Survey	·	650 m	MPC · JPL
694798	2015 TV_{313}	—	September 23, 2004	Kitt Peak	Spacewatch	EOS	1.9 km	MPC · JPL
694799	2015 TS_{314}	—	January 18, 2004	Kitt Peak	Spacewatch	·	1.9 km	MPC · JPL
694800	2015 TZ_{314}	—	April 10, 2013	Haleakala	Pan-STARRS 1	·	2.5 km	MPC · JPL

== 694801–694900 ==
back to top

Designation			Discovery			Properties		Ref
Permanent	Provisional	Named after	Date	Site	Discoverer(s)	Category	Diam.	Ref
694801	2015 TL_{318}	—	September 9, 2004	Kitt Peak	Spacewatch	EOS	1.5 km	MPC · JPL
694802	2015 TK_{321}	—	September 15, 2009	Mount Lemmon	Mount Lemmon Survey	·	2.4 km	MPC · JPL
694803	2015 TU_{321}	—	December 25, 2011	Piszkéstető	K. Sárneczky	·	1.7 km	MPC · JPL
694804	2015 TH_{324}	—	August 21, 2015	Haleakala	Pan-STARRS 1	·	550 m	MPC · JPL
694805	2015 TS_{324}	—	November 7, 2002	Kitt Peak	Deep Ecliptic Survey	·	2.1 km	MPC · JPL
694806	2015 TP_{325}	—	December 28, 2007	Kitt Peak	Spacewatch	·	1.7 km	MPC · JPL
694807	2015 TQ_{325}	—	July 2, 2014	Haleakala	Pan-STARRS 1	EOS	1.4 km	MPC · JPL
694808	2015 TJ_{326}	—	December 3, 2010	Mount Lemmon	Mount Lemmon Survey	·	2.7 km	MPC · JPL
694809	2015 TK_{327}	—	June 24, 2014	Haleakala	Pan-STARRS 1	·	1.5 km	MPC · JPL
694810	2015 TL_{328}	—	July 27, 2014	Haleakala	Pan-STARRS 1	EOS	1.5 km	MPC · JPL
694811	2015 TE_{329}	—	October 10, 2010	Mount Lemmon	Mount Lemmon Survey	·	1.5 km	MPC · JPL
694812	2015 TU_{329}	—	August 21, 2015	Haleakala	Pan-STARRS 1	·	2.1 km	MPC · JPL
694813	2015 TS_{331}	—	October 13, 2015	Haleakala	Pan-STARRS 1	·	2.6 km	MPC · JPL
694814	2015 TD_{332}	—	April 3, 2008	Mount Lemmon	Mount Lemmon Survey	EOS	1.7 km	MPC · JPL
694815	2015 TR_{332}	—	July 25, 2014	Haleakala	Pan-STARRS 1	TEL	1.2 km	MPC · JPL
694816	2015 TC_{333}	—	July 25, 2014	Haleakala	Pan-STARRS 1	·	2.2 km	MPC · JPL
694817	2015 TT_{333}	—	November 6, 2010	Mount Lemmon	Mount Lemmon Survey	VER	2.2 km	MPC · JPL
694818	2015 TV_{333}	—	July 26, 2014	Haleakala	Pan-STARRS 1	·	2.2 km	MPC · JPL
694819	2015 TN_{334}	—	March 19, 2013	Haleakala	Pan-STARRS 1	·	720 m	MPC · JPL
694820	2015 TL_{335}	—	September 12, 2015	Haleakala	Pan-STARRS 1	·	2.2 km	MPC · JPL
694821	2015 TC_{336}	—	April 13, 2013	Haleakala	Pan-STARRS 1	·	2.8 km	MPC · JPL
694822	2015 TW_{338}	—	January 15, 2008	Mount Lemmon	Mount Lemmon Survey	·	1.8 km	MPC · JPL
694823	2015 TP_{339}	—	November 7, 2002	Kitt Peak	Deep Ecliptic Survey	·	1.3 km	MPC · JPL
694824	2015 TQ_{342}	—	July 19, 2015	Haleakala	Pan-STARRS 1	·	1.7 km	MPC · JPL
694825	2015 TD_{343}	—	January 30, 2012	Mount Lemmon	Mount Lemmon Survey	·	2.5 km	MPC · JPL
694826	2015 TB_{344}	—	January 19, 2012	Haleakala	Pan-STARRS 1	·	2.1 km	MPC · JPL
694827	2015 TM_{344}	—	October 10, 2015	Haleakala	Pan-STARRS 1	AST	1.5 km	MPC · JPL
694828	2015 TX_{344}	—	February 27, 2006	Mount Lemmon	Mount Lemmon Survey	THM	1.9 km	MPC · JPL
694829	2015 TF_{346}	—	October 13, 2010	Mount Lemmon	Mount Lemmon Survey	·	1.9 km	MPC · JPL
694830	2015 TJ_{347}	—	July 25, 2014	Haleakala	Pan-STARRS 1	·	2.3 km	MPC · JPL
694831	2015 TQ_{347}	—	March 26, 2007	Mount Lemmon	Mount Lemmon Survey	·	2.2 km	MPC · JPL
694832	2015 TU_{347}	—	September 9, 2015	Haleakala	Pan-STARRS 1	·	2.5 km	MPC · JPL
694833	2015 TD_{348}	—	April 10, 2013	Haleakala	Pan-STARRS 1	EOS	1.4 km	MPC · JPL
694834	2015 TF_{349}	—	April 10, 2013	Mount Lemmon	Mount Lemmon Survey	·	2.5 km	MPC · JPL
694835	2015 TV_{353}	—	October 1, 2015	Mount Lemmon	Mount Lemmon Survey	EOS	1.6 km	MPC · JPL
694836	2015 TZ_{353}	—	October 3, 2015	Mount Lemmon	Mount Lemmon Survey	·	1.8 km	MPC · JPL
694837	2015 TA_{359}	—	January 18, 2013	Mount Lemmon	Mount Lemmon Survey	·	680 m	MPC · JPL
694838	2015 TC_{359}	—	January 10, 2013	Haleakala	Pan-STARRS 1	V	400 m	MPC · JPL
694839	2015 TH_{359}	—	October 8, 2015	Haleakala	Pan-STARRS 1	TIR	1.9 km	MPC · JPL
694840	2015 TJ_{359}	—	October 9, 2015	Haleakala	Pan-STARRS 1	·	2.7 km	MPC · JPL
694841	2015 TQ_{359}	—	September 19, 2009	Mount Lemmon	Mount Lemmon Survey	·	1.9 km	MPC · JPL
694842	2015 TU_{359}	—	September 7, 2008	Mount Lemmon	Mount Lemmon Survey	·	500 m	MPC · JPL
694843	2015 TN_{360}	—	October 11, 2015	Bergisch Gladbach	W. Bickel	·	1.9 km	MPC · JPL
694844	2015 TM_{365}	—	November 18, 1998	Kitt Peak	Spacewatch	·	1.2 km	MPC · JPL
694845	2015 TA_{366}	—	October 10, 2015	Haleakala	Pan-STARRS 1	·	2.9 km	MPC · JPL
694846	2015 TF_{366}	—	February 10, 2008	Mount Lemmon	Mount Lemmon Survey	·	1.5 km	MPC · JPL
694847	2015 TY_{366}	—	December 23, 2012	Haleakala	Pan-STARRS 1	·	500 m	MPC · JPL
694848	2015 TE_{367}	—	October 15, 2015	Haleakala	Pan-STARRS 1	·	580 m	MPC · JPL
694849	2015 TN_{367}	—	August 20, 2009	Bergisch Gladbach	W. Bickel	·	2.3 km	MPC · JPL
694850	2015 TZ_{367}	—	October 10, 2015	Haleakala	Pan-STARRS 1	·	2.2 km	MPC · JPL
694851	2015 TG_{368}	—	June 3, 2014	Haleakala	Pan-STARRS 1	·	2.2 km	MPC · JPL
694852	2015 TM_{368}	—	October 12, 2015	Haleakala	Pan-STARRS 1	·	2.6 km	MPC · JPL
694853	2015 TD_{369}	—	October 1, 2015	Mount Lemmon	Mount Lemmon Survey	·	2.3 km	MPC · JPL
694854	2015 TK_{369}	—	October 19, 2003	Kitt Peak	Spacewatch	·	2.3 km	MPC · JPL
694855	2015 TN_{369}	—	May 7, 2014	Haleakala	Pan-STARRS 1	·	1.2 km	MPC · JPL
694856	2015 TX_{369}	—	September 17, 2006	Kitt Peak	Spacewatch	·	1.7 km	MPC · JPL
694857	2015 TE_{372}	—	October 8, 2015	Haleakala	Pan-STARRS 1	·	660 m	MPC · JPL
694858	2015 TZ_{372}	—	October 8, 2015	Haleakala	Pan-STARRS 1	·	1.9 km	MPC · JPL
694859	2015 TB_{373}	—	January 14, 2011	Mount Lemmon	Mount Lemmon Survey	·	2.5 km	MPC · JPL
694860	2015 TH_{373}	—	October 8, 2015	Haleakala	Pan-STARRS 1	·	2.0 km	MPC · JPL
694861	2015 TK_{373}	—	October 14, 2001	Apache Point	SDSS Collaboration	·	1.4 km	MPC · JPL
694862	2015 TO_{373}	—	October 8, 2015	Haleakala	Pan-STARRS 1	·	2.3 km	MPC · JPL
694863	2015 TW_{374}	—	October 8, 2015	Haleakala	Pan-STARRS 1	·	2.0 km	MPC · JPL
694864	2015 TE_{375}	—	February 26, 2012	Haleakala	Pan-STARRS 1	EOS	1.5 km	MPC · JPL
694865	2015 TA_{376}	—	October 9, 2015	Haleakala	Pan-STARRS 1	·	2.5 km	MPC · JPL
694866	2015 TT_{376}	—	March 23, 2012	Mount Lemmon	Mount Lemmon Survey	·	2.5 km	MPC · JPL
694867	2015 TK_{377}	—	October 9, 2015	Haleakala	Pan-STARRS 1	·	2.4 km	MPC · JPL
694868	2015 TE_{378}	—	October 15, 2004	Kitt Peak	Spacewatch	·	2.2 km	MPC · JPL
694869	2015 TQ_{378}	—	October 10, 2015	Haleakala	Pan-STARRS 1	·	2.6 km	MPC · JPL
694870	2015 TE_{379}	—	September 16, 2006	Kitt Peak	Spacewatch	·	1.1 km	MPC · JPL
694871	2015 TK_{379}	—	October 8, 2008	Kitt Peak	Spacewatch	V	410 m	MPC · JPL
694872	2015 TO_{379}	—	April 10, 2013	Haleakala	Pan-STARRS 1	·	1.9 km	MPC · JPL
694873	2015 TC_{380}	—	March 13, 2013	Haleakala	Pan-STARRS 1	TIR	2.3 km	MPC · JPL
694874	2015 TH_{380}	—	October 10, 2015	Haleakala	Pan-STARRS 1	·	860 m	MPC · JPL
694875	2015 TQ_{380}	—	August 20, 2014	Haleakala	Pan-STARRS 1	·	2.3 km	MPC · JPL
694876	2015 TP_{381}	—	October 10, 2015	Haleakala	Pan-STARRS 1	VER	2.1 km	MPC · JPL
694877	2015 TF_{382}	—	December 25, 2010	Mount Lemmon	Mount Lemmon Survey	·	2.9 km	MPC · JPL
694878	2015 TR_{382}	—	July 1, 2014	Haleakala	Pan-STARRS 1	·	1.9 km	MPC · JPL
694879	2015 TB_{383}	—	October 10, 2015	Haleakala	Pan-STARRS 1	·	3.0 km	MPC · JPL
694880	2015 TK_{383}	—	October 10, 2015	Haleakala	Pan-STARRS 1	·	960 m	MPC · JPL
694881	2015 TV_{383}	—	October 12, 2015	Kitt Peak	Spacewatch	·	670 m	MPC · JPL
694882	2015 TP_{384}	—	October 12, 2015	Haleakala	Pan-STARRS 1	V	480 m	MPC · JPL
694883	2015 TW_{385}	—	August 3, 2014	Haleakala	Pan-STARRS 1	·	1.8 km	MPC · JPL
694884	2015 TE_{386}	—	October 15, 2015	Haleakala	Pan-STARRS 1	·	2.0 km	MPC · JPL
694885	2015 TM_{386}	—	July 28, 2014	Haleakala	Pan-STARRS 1	VER	2.1 km	MPC · JPL
694886	2015 TF_{387}	—	October 11, 2015	Catalina	CSS	HNS	1.3 km	MPC · JPL
694887	2015 TL_{387}	—	October 2, 2015	Haleakala	Pan-STARRS 1	·	2.8 km	MPC · JPL
694888	2015 TG_{410}	—	December 31, 2008	Mount Lemmon	Mount Lemmon Survey	NYS	770 m	MPC · JPL
694889	2015 TS_{412}	—	October 1, 2015	Mount Lemmon	Mount Lemmon Survey	EOS	1.4 km	MPC · JPL
694890	2015 TT_{412}	—	October 9, 2015	Haleakala	Pan-STARRS 1	·	2.2 km	MPC · JPL
694891	2015 TQ_{414}	—	October 2, 2015	Kitt Peak	Spacewatch	VER	2.0 km	MPC · JPL
694892	2015 TK_{415}	—	October 2, 2015	Mount Lemmon	Mount Lemmon Survey	·	2.2 km	MPC · JPL
694893	2015 TR_{415}	—	October 2, 2015	Mount Lemmon	Mount Lemmon Survey	·	2.1 km	MPC · JPL
694894	2015 TV_{415}	—	October 14, 2015	Kitt Peak	Spacewatch	·	2.1 km	MPC · JPL
694895	2015 TH_{416}	—	October 3, 2015	Mount Lemmon	Mount Lemmon Survey	·	2.2 km	MPC · JPL
694896	2015 TF_{417}	—	October 3, 2015	Mount Lemmon	Mount Lemmon Survey	·	510 m	MPC · JPL
694897	2015 TJ_{417}	—	October 13, 2015	Haleakala	Pan-STARRS 1	·	2.6 km	MPC · JPL
694898	2015 TL_{418}	—	October 10, 2015	Haleakala	Pan-STARRS 1	(6355)	2.8 km	MPC · JPL
694899	2015 TN_{418}	—	July 27, 2014	Haleakala	Pan-STARRS 1	·	2.3 km	MPC · JPL
694900	2015 TT_{418}	—	October 8, 2015	Haleakala	Pan-STARRS 1	·	2.2 km	MPC · JPL

== 694901–695000 ==
back to top

Designation			Discovery			Properties		Ref
Permanent	Provisional	Named after	Date	Site	Discoverer(s)	Category	Diam.	Ref
694901	2015 TW_{422}	—	October 10, 2015	Haleakala	Pan-STARRS 1	·	1.6 km	MPC · JPL
694902	2015 TX_{422}	—	October 26, 2011	Haleakala	Pan-STARRS 1	·	1.7 km	MPC · JPL
694903	2015 TY_{422}	—	July 28, 2014	Haleakala	Pan-STARRS 1	·	2.0 km	MPC · JPL
694904	2015 TC_{423}	—	October 10, 2015	Haleakala	Pan-STARRS 1	·	2.4 km	MPC · JPL
694905	2015 TK_{423}	—	July 27, 2014	Haleakala	Pan-STARRS 1	EOS	1.5 km	MPC · JPL
694906	2015 TC_{425}	—	October 10, 2015	Haleakala	Pan-STARRS 1	·	2.5 km	MPC · JPL
694907	2015 TJ_{425}	—	October 12, 2015	Haleakala	Pan-STARRS 1	·	2.3 km	MPC · JPL
694908	2015 TK_{425}	—	October 13, 2015	Haleakala	Pan-STARRS 1	EOS	1.4 km	MPC · JPL
694909	2015 TO_{425}	—	October 11, 2015	Mount Lemmon	Mount Lemmon Survey	·	2.0 km	MPC · JPL
694910	2015 TV_{425}	—	October 15, 2015	Haleakala	Pan-STARRS 1	·	2.1 km	MPC · JPL
694911	2015 TF_{426}	—	October 12, 2015	Haleakala	Pan-STARRS 1	·	2.5 km	MPC · JPL
694912	2015 TC_{427}	—	October 9, 2015	Haleakala	Pan-STARRS 1	·	2.4 km	MPC · JPL
694913	2015 TM_{427}	—	October 12, 2015	Haleakala	Pan-STARRS 1	EOS	1.3 km	MPC · JPL
694914	2015 TD_{428}	—	October 3, 2015	Mount Lemmon	Mount Lemmon Survey	EOS	1.4 km	MPC · JPL
694915	2015 TG_{429}	—	October 10, 2015	Haleakala	Pan-STARRS 1	·	2.2 km	MPC · JPL
694916	2015 TV_{430}	—	October 15, 2015	Haleakala	Pan-STARRS 1	·	1.9 km	MPC · JPL
694917	2015 TY_{431}	—	October 12, 2015	Haleakala	Pan-STARRS 1	·	1.5 km	MPC · JPL
694918	2015 TD_{432}	—	October 10, 2015	Haleakala	Pan-STARRS 1	·	2.2 km	MPC · JPL
694919	2015 TH_{432}	—	October 8, 2015	Haleakala	Pan-STARRS 1	·	2.5 km	MPC · JPL
694920	2015 TR_{432}	—	October 10, 2015	Haleakala	Pan-STARRS 1	·	520 m	MPC · JPL
694921	2015 TJ_{442}	—	October 10, 2015	Haleakala	Pan-STARRS 1	·	1.4 km	MPC · JPL
694922	2015 TP_{442}	—	October 13, 2015	Haleakala	Pan-STARRS 1	T_{j} (2.93)	3.2 km	MPC · JPL
694923	2015 TX_{445}	—	October 3, 2015	Mount Lemmon	Mount Lemmon Survey	·	2.3 km	MPC · JPL
694924	2015 TY_{445}	—	October 15, 2015	Haleakala	Pan-STARRS 1	VER	1.9 km	MPC · JPL
694925	2015 TY_{447}	—	October 11, 2015	Mount Lemmon	Mount Lemmon Survey	·	2.3 km	MPC · JPL
694926	2015 TB_{448}	—	October 10, 2015	Haleakala	Pan-STARRS 1	·	3.0 km	MPC · JPL
694927	2015 TD_{448}	—	October 10, 2015	Haleakala	Pan-STARRS 1	·	2.5 km	MPC · JPL
694928	2015 TW_{450}	—	October 13, 2015	Mount Lemmon	Mount Lemmon Survey	·	430 m	MPC · JPL
694929	2015 TT_{454}	—	October 14, 2015	La Palma	La Palma	·	2.3 km	MPC · JPL
694930	2015 TZ_{455}	—	October 13, 2015	Haleakala	Pan-STARRS 1	·	2.5 km	MPC · JPL
694931	2015 TA_{456}	—	October 10, 2015	Haleakala	Pan-STARRS 1	·	2.1 km	MPC · JPL
694932	2015 TL_{456}	—	October 3, 2015	Mount Lemmon	Mount Lemmon Survey	·	2.2 km	MPC · JPL
694933	2015 TS_{456}	—	July 29, 2014	Haleakala	Pan-STARRS 1	·	2.5 km	MPC · JPL
694934	2015 TW_{456}	—	October 12, 2015	Haleakala	Pan-STARRS 1	VER	2.1 km	MPC · JPL
694935	2015 TS_{460}	—	April 25, 2007	Kitt Peak	Spacewatch	EOS	1.5 km	MPC · JPL
694936	2015 TQ_{463}	—	February 7, 2002	Kitt Peak	Spacewatch	MAS	470 m	MPC · JPL
694937	2015 TZ_{463}	—	October 2, 2015	Mount Lemmon	Mount Lemmon Survey	·	2.1 km	MPC · JPL
694938	2015 TY_{486}	—	February 24, 2012	Mount Lemmon	Mount Lemmon Survey	·	2.1 km	MPC · JPL
694939	2015 US	—	April 6, 2013	Mount Lemmon	Mount Lemmon Survey	KOR	1.0 km	MPC · JPL
694940	2015 UD_{4}	—	January 13, 2008	Kitt Peak	Spacewatch	·	1.5 km	MPC · JPL
694941	2015 UJ_{4}	—	October 25, 2001	Kitt Peak	Spacewatch	·	1.7 km	MPC · JPL
694942	2015 UL_{5}	—	November 27, 2006	Mount Lemmon	Mount Lemmon Survey	AGN	1.1 km	MPC · JPL
694943	2015 UH_{6}	—	April 29, 2011	Mount Lemmon	Mount Lemmon Survey	·	610 m	MPC · JPL
694944	2015 UL_{6}	—	June 24, 2014	Mount Lemmon	Mount Lemmon Survey	·	2.3 km	MPC · JPL
694945	2015 UA_{8}	—	October 18, 2015	Haleakala	Pan-STARRS 1	·	1.9 km	MPC · JPL
694946	2015 UD_{8}	—	March 19, 2013	Haleakala	Pan-STARRS 1	HOF	2.1 km	MPC · JPL
694947	2015 UN_{8}	—	April 11, 2007	Mount Lemmon	Mount Lemmon Survey	·	2.4 km	MPC · JPL
694948	2015 UW_{8}	—	January 19, 2012	Haleakala	Pan-STARRS 1	EOS	1.4 km	MPC · JPL
694949	2015 UF_{9}	—	November 19, 2008	Mount Lemmon	Mount Lemmon Survey	NYS	1.1 km	MPC · JPL
694950	2015 UU_{9}	—	September 12, 2015	Haleakala	Pan-STARRS 1	THM	1.9 km	MPC · JPL
694951	2015 UZ_{11}	—	November 6, 2010	Mount Lemmon	Mount Lemmon Survey	EOS	1.3 km	MPC · JPL
694952	2015 UN_{13}	—	October 13, 2004	Kitt Peak	Spacewatch	THM	2.2 km	MPC · JPL
694953	2015 UO_{13}	—	September 12, 2015	Haleakala	Pan-STARRS 1	·	2.3 km	MPC · JPL
694954	2015 UR_{13}	—	September 11, 2004	Kitt Peak	Spacewatch	·	2.0 km	MPC · JPL
694955	2015 UA_{14}	—	September 3, 2010	Mount Lemmon	Mount Lemmon Survey	·	1.6 km	MPC · JPL
694956	2015 UT_{14}	—	September 11, 2015	Haleakala	Pan-STARRS 1	·	2.4 km	MPC · JPL
694957	2015 UV_{17}	—	June 24, 2014	Haleakala	Pan-STARRS 1	EOS	1.4 km	MPC · JPL
694958	2015 UJ_{18}	—	September 12, 2004	Kitt Peak	Spacewatch	EOS	1.6 km	MPC · JPL
694959	2015 UA_{19}	—	February 23, 2007	Kitt Peak	Spacewatch	·	2.4 km	MPC · JPL
694960	2015 UN_{19}	—	October 13, 2015	Kitt Peak	Spacewatch	·	1.8 km	MPC · JPL
694961	2015 UK_{21}	—	September 9, 2015	Haleakala	Pan-STARRS 1	·	520 m	MPC · JPL
694962	2015 UX_{21}	—	December 13, 2010	Mount Lemmon	Mount Lemmon Survey	·	2.0 km	MPC · JPL
694963	2015 UX_{22}	—	March 10, 2007	Mount Lemmon	Mount Lemmon Survey	·	1.7 km	MPC · JPL
694964	2015 UV_{23}	—	September 10, 2004	Kitt Peak	Spacewatch	EMA	2.7 km	MPC · JPL
694965	2015 UZ_{26}	—	October 18, 2015	Haleakala	Pan-STARRS 1	KOR	1.2 km	MPC · JPL
694966	2015 UE_{27}	—	October 19, 2010	Mount Lemmon	Mount Lemmon Survey	·	2.3 km	MPC · JPL
694967	2015 UE_{28}	—	January 11, 2013	Oukaïmeden	C. Rinner	·	520 m	MPC · JPL
694968	2015 UX_{28}	—	October 14, 2015	Kitt Peak	Spacewatch	·	2.3 km	MPC · JPL
694969	2015 UA_{32}	—	March 27, 2014	Haleakala	Pan-STARRS 1	·	520 m	MPC · JPL
694970	2015 UE_{32}	—	April 5, 2011	Mount Lemmon	Mount Lemmon Survey	·	550 m	MPC · JPL
694971	2015 UX_{32}	—	November 6, 2010	Mount Lemmon	Mount Lemmon Survey	·	1.8 km	MPC · JPL
694972	2015 UC_{33}	—	October 1, 2010	Mount Lemmon	Mount Lemmon Survey	KOR	1.2 km	MPC · JPL
694973	2015 UA_{35}	—	November 11, 2010	Kitt Peak	Spacewatch	·	3.0 km	MPC · JPL
694974	2015 UF_{36}	—	April 15, 2013	Haleakala	Pan-STARRS 1	·	2.6 km	MPC · JPL
694975	2015 UJ_{36}	—	October 18, 2015	Haleakala	Pan-STARRS 1	·	2.2 km	MPC · JPL
694976	2015 UF_{37}	—	October 15, 2004	Mount Lemmon	Mount Lemmon Survey	·	2.4 km	MPC · JPL
694977	2015 UW_{37}	—	September 11, 2015	Haleakala	Pan-STARRS 1	·	1.4 km	MPC · JPL
694978	2015 UE_{38}	—	October 18, 2015	Haleakala	Pan-STARRS 1	·	910 m	MPC · JPL
694979	2015 UO_{39}	—	October 22, 2006	Kitt Peak	Spacewatch	AGN	1.0 km	MPC · JPL
694980	2015 UG_{40}	—	March 18, 2004	Kitt Peak	Spacewatch	·	1.5 km	MPC · JPL
694981	2015 UH_{41}	—	October 6, 2004	Kitt Peak	Spacewatch	·	2.2 km	MPC · JPL
694982	2015 UH_{42}	—	September 12, 2015	Haleakala	Pan-STARRS 1	·	2.6 km	MPC · JPL
694983	2015 UJ_{42}	—	May 8, 2013	Haleakala	Pan-STARRS 1	·	2.6 km	MPC · JPL
694984	2015 UN_{42}	—	February 3, 2001	Kitt Peak	Spacewatch	·	1.5 km	MPC · JPL
694985	2015 UA_{44}	—	September 20, 2004	Siding Spring	SSS	·	2.8 km	MPC · JPL
694986	2015 UG_{44}	—	July 29, 2014	Haleakala	Pan-STARRS 1	·	2.6 km	MPC · JPL
694987	2015 UY_{44}	—	April 30, 2014	Haleakala	Pan-STARRS 1	·	640 m	MPC · JPL
694988	2015 UG_{46}	—	June 29, 2014	Haleakala	Pan-STARRS 1	·	2.5 km	MPC · JPL
694989	2015 UC_{47}	—	August 4, 2005	Palomar	NEAT	·	550 m	MPC · JPL
694990	2015 UP_{47}	—	June 28, 2014	Haleakala	Pan-STARRS 1	·	2.4 km	MPC · JPL
694991	2015 UV_{47}	—	October 8, 2015	Haleakala	Pan-STARRS 1	URS	2.3 km	MPC · JPL
694992	2015 UD_{48}	—	September 28, 2009	Kitt Peak	Spacewatch	·	2.1 km	MPC · JPL
694993	2015 UP_{48}	—	October 10, 2015	Haleakala	Pan-STARRS 1	·	1.5 km	MPC · JPL
694994	2015 UY_{48}	—	December 2, 2005	Mount Lemmon	Mount Lemmon Survey	·	1.7 km	MPC · JPL
694995	2015 UB_{49}	—	May 15, 2013	Haleakala	Pan-STARRS 1	VER	2.1 km	MPC · JPL
694996	2015 UJ_{49}	—	October 14, 2010	Mount Lemmon	Mount Lemmon Survey	·	2.6 km	MPC · JPL
694997	2015 UT_{49}	—	June 29, 2014	Haleakala	Pan-STARRS 1	·	2.3 km	MPC · JPL
694998	2015 UB_{50}	—	May 10, 2014	Mount Lemmon	Mount Lemmon Survey	·	1.7 km	MPC · JPL
694999	2015 UC_{50}	—	August 3, 2014	Haleakala	Pan-STARRS 1	·	2.3 km	MPC · JPL
695000	2015 UT_{50}	—	October 9, 2015	Haleakala	Pan-STARRS 1	·	2.2 km	MPC · JPL

back to top

== Meaning of names ==
As minor planet discoveries are confirmed, they are given a permanent number by the IAU's Minor Planet Center (MPC), and the discoverers can then submit names for them, following the IAU's naming conventions. The list below concerns those minor planets in the specified number-range that have received names, and explains the meanings of those names.

Official naming citations of newly named small Solar System bodies are approved and published in a bulletin by IAU's Working Group for Small Bodies Nomenclature (WGSBN). Before May 2021, citations were published in MPC's Minor Planet Circulars for many decades. Recent citations can also be found on the JPL Small-Body Database (SBDB). Until his death in 2016, German astronomer Lutz D. Schmadel compiled these citations into the Dictionary of Minor Planet Names (DMP) and regularly updated the collection.

Based on Paul Herget's The Names of the Minor Planets, Schmadel also researched the unclear origin of numerous asteroids, most of which had been named prior to World War II. This article incorporates text from this source, which is in the public domain: SBDB New namings may only be added to this list below after official publication as the preannouncement of names is condemned. The WGSBN publishes a comprehensive guideline for the naming rules of non-cometary small Solar System bodies.

Named minor planet	Provisional	This minor planet was named for...	Ref · Catalog
694537 Vîntdevară	2015 SS_{28}	Ciprian Vîntdevară (born 1984), Romanian public-outreach staff member at the Vasile Pârvan Museum in Bârlad.	IAU · 694537
