= List of minor planets: 782001–783000 =

The following is a partial list of minor planets, running from minor-planet number 782001 through 783000, inclusive. The primary data for this and other partial lists is based on JPL's "Small-Body Orbital Elements" and data available from the Minor Planet Center. Critical list information is also provided by the MPC, unless otherwise specified from Lowell Observatory. A detailed description of the table's columns and additional sources are given on the main page including a complete list of every page in this series, and a statistical break-up on the dynamical classification of minor planets.

Also see the summary list of all named bodies in numerical and alphabetical order, and the corresponding naming citations for the number range of this particular list. New namings may only be added to this list after official publication, as the preannouncement of names is condemned by the Working Group for Small Bodies Nomenclature of the International Astronomical Union.

Near-Earth obj.	MBA (inner)	MBA (outer)	Centaur
Mars-crosser	MBA (middle)	Jupiter trojan	Trans-Neptunian obj.
Unclassified

== 782001–782100 ==
Designation			Discovery			Properties		Ref
Permanent	Provisional	Named after	Date	Site	Discoverer(s)	Category	Diam.	Ref
782001	2013 VH_{86}	—	November 11, 2013	Mount Lemmon	Mount Lemmon Survey	·	1.7 km	MPC · JPL
782002	2013 VV_{86}	—	November 8, 2013	Mount Lemmon	Mount Lemmon Survey	EOS	1.2 km	MPC · JPL
782003	2013 VX_{86}	—	November 9, 2013	Mount Lemmon	Mount Lemmon Survey	L5	5.1 km	MPC · JPL
782004	2013 VR_{87}	—	November 9, 2013	Mount Lemmon	Mount Lemmon Survey	EOS	1.1 km	MPC · JPL
782005	2013 VZ_{88}	—	November 6, 2013	Haleakala	Pan-STARRS 1	·	2.4 km	MPC · JPL
782006	2013 VL_{92}	—	November 10, 2013	Mount Lemmon	Mount Lemmon Survey	·	2.8 km	MPC · JPL
782007	2013 VN_{93}	—	November 6, 2013	Haleakala	Pan-STARRS 1	·	2.2 km	MPC · JPL
782008	2013 VV_{93}	—	November 8, 2013	Mount Lemmon	Mount Lemmon Survey	·	1.7 km	MPC · JPL
782009	2013 VJ_{94}	—	November 9, 2013	Kitt Peak	Spacewatch	·	2.1 km	MPC · JPL
782010	2013 WC_{9}	—	November 26, 2013	Mount Lemmon	Mount Lemmon Survey	KOR	990 m	MPC · JPL
782011	2013 WO_{11}	—	November 2, 2013	Kitt Peak	Spacewatch	·	1.5 km	MPC · JPL
782012	2013 WX_{14}	—	November 27, 2013	Haleakala	Pan-STARRS 1	·	1.5 km	MPC · JPL
782013	2013 WT_{17}	—	November 27, 2013	Haleakala	Pan-STARRS 1	·	1.3 km	MPC · JPL
782014	2013 WP_{20}	—	September 10, 2007	Mount Lemmon	Mount Lemmon Survey	·	1.6 km	MPC · JPL
782015	2013 WK_{25}	—	October 5, 2013	Kitt Peak	Spacewatch	EUN	1.1 km	MPC · JPL
782016	2013 WR_{25}	—	November 24, 2013	Haleakala	Pan-STARRS 1	·	2.0 km	MPC · JPL
782017	2013 WR_{28}	—	November 26, 2013	Mount Lemmon	Mount Lemmon Survey	·	980 m	MPC · JPL
782018	2013 WR_{29}	—	November 26, 2013	Mount Lemmon	Mount Lemmon Survey	·	1.3 km	MPC · JPL
782019	2013 WJ_{30}	—	November 8, 2013	Mount Lemmon	Mount Lemmon Survey	·	1.2 km	MPC · JPL
782020	2013 WK_{31}	—	September 6, 2008	Kitt Peak	Spacewatch	·	1.3 km	MPC · JPL
782021	2013 WL_{32}	—	November 9, 2013	Haleakala	Pan-STARRS 1	·	1.3 km	MPC · JPL
782022	2013 WY_{33}	—	November 26, 2013	Haleakala	Pan-STARRS 1	EOS	1.2 km	MPC · JPL
782023	2013 WB_{35}	—	December 30, 2008	Kitt Peak	Spacewatch	·	1.6 km	MPC · JPL
782024	2013 WJ_{35}	—	May 21, 2012	Mount Lemmon	Mount Lemmon Survey	·	1.4 km	MPC · JPL
782025	2013 WK_{35}	—	November 26, 2013	Haleakala	Pan-STARRS 1	·	1.2 km	MPC · JPL
782026	2013 WT_{35}	—	November 10, 2013	Kitt Peak	Spacewatch	·	1.4 km	MPC · JPL
782027	2013 WC_{36}	—	November 27, 2013	Haleakala	Pan-STARRS 1	·	1.2 km	MPC · JPL
782028	2013 WV_{36}	—	November 27, 2013	Haleakala	Pan-STARRS 1	·	2.1 km	MPC · JPL
782029	2013 WC_{49}	—	November 11, 2013	Mount Lemmon	Mount Lemmon Survey	·	1.6 km	MPC · JPL
782030	2013 WR_{50}	—	November 30, 2008	Kitt Peak	Spacewatch	·	1.4 km	MPC · JPL
782031	2013 WE_{51}	—	November 25, 2013	Haleakala	Pan-STARRS 1	·	2.6 km	MPC · JPL
782032	2013 WR_{51}	—	November 25, 2013	Haleakala	Pan-STARRS 1	·	2.2 km	MPC · JPL
782033	2013 WM_{53}	—	November 25, 2013	Haleakala	Pan-STARRS 1	EUP	3.2 km	MPC · JPL
782034	2013 WO_{53}	—	November 25, 2013	Haleakala	Pan-STARRS 1	·	1.3 km	MPC · JPL
782035	2013 WT_{53}	—	November 25, 2013	Haleakala	Pan-STARRS 1	TIR	2.0 km	MPC · JPL
782036	2013 WG_{58}	—	November 9, 2013	Haleakala	Pan-STARRS 1	·	1.8 km	MPC · JPL
782037	2013 WE_{72}	—	November 26, 2013	Mount Lemmon	Mount Lemmon Survey	·	1.5 km	MPC · JPL
782038	2013 WV_{75}	—	November 8, 2013	Mount Lemmon	Mount Lemmon Survey	·	1.6 km	MPC · JPL
782039	2013 WO_{76}	—	December 1, 2008	Kitt Peak	Spacewatch	·	1.3 km	MPC · JPL
782040	2013 WC_{80}	—	December 29, 2008	Kitt Peak	Spacewatch	·	1.8 km	MPC · JPL
782041	2013 WR_{86}	—	November 27, 2013	Haleakala	Pan-STARRS 1	·	2.8 km	MPC · JPL
782042	2013 WG_{88}	—	November 28, 2013	Mount Lemmon	Mount Lemmon Survey	·	2.0 km	MPC · JPL
782043	2013 WQ_{90}	—	November 28, 2013	Mount Lemmon	Mount Lemmon Survey	HOF	2.0 km	MPC · JPL
782044	2013 WW_{92}	—	November 28, 2013	Mount Lemmon	Mount Lemmon Survey	·	1.4 km	MPC · JPL
782045	2013 WO_{112}	—	December 21, 2008	Mount Lemmon	Mount Lemmon Survey	·	1.4 km	MPC · JPL
782046	2013 WS_{115}	—	November 26, 2013	Mount Lemmon	Mount Lemmon Survey	·	2.0 km	MPC · JPL
782047	2013 WZ_{115}	—	November 28, 2013	Mount Lemmon	Mount Lemmon Survey	·	1.5 km	MPC · JPL
782048	2013 WJ_{121}	—	October 15, 2007	Mount Lemmon	Mount Lemmon Survey	·	2.1 km	MPC · JPL
782049	2013 WP_{121}	—	July 25, 2017	Haleakala	Pan-STARRS 1	EOS	1.1 km	MPC · JPL
782050	2013 WW_{121}	—	November 28, 2013	Mount Lemmon	Mount Lemmon Survey	EOS	1.2 km	MPC · JPL
782051	2013 WX_{121}	—	December 27, 2005	Kitt Peak	Spacewatch	·	800 m	MPC · JPL
782052	2013 WB_{122}	—	November 28, 2013	Mount Lemmon	Mount Lemmon Survey	·	1.6 km	MPC · JPL
782053	2013 WH_{122}	—	November 28, 2013	Mount Lemmon	Mount Lemmon Survey	·	1.5 km	MPC · JPL
782054	2013 WH_{124}	—	November 4, 2013	Mount Lemmon	Mount Lemmon Survey	·	1.1 km	MPC · JPL
782055	2013 WG_{125}	—	January 23, 2015	Haleakala	Pan-STARRS 1	·	1.3 km	MPC · JPL
782056	2013 WG_{126}	—	November 28, 2013	Mount Lemmon	Mount Lemmon Survey	KOR	1.1 km	MPC · JPL
782057	2013 WJ_{126}	—	November 27, 2013	Haleakala	Pan-STARRS 1	EOS	1.3 km	MPC · JPL
782058	2013 WM_{126}	—	November 26, 2013	Mount Lemmon	Mount Lemmon Survey	·	1.4 km	MPC · JPL
782059	2013 WL_{127}	—	November 27, 2013	Haleakala	Pan-STARRS 1	·	2.0 km	MPC · JPL
782060	2013 WX_{127}	—	November 28, 2013	Mount Lemmon	Mount Lemmon Survey	EOS	1.4 km	MPC · JPL
782061	2013 WF_{128}	—	November 27, 2013	Haleakala	Pan-STARRS 1	·	1.7 km	MPC · JPL
782062	2013 WS_{128}	—	November 29, 2013	Mount Lemmon	Mount Lemmon Survey	EOS	1.3 km	MPC · JPL
782063	2013 WC_{129}	—	November 28, 2013	Mount Lemmon	Mount Lemmon Survey	·	1.8 km	MPC · JPL
782064	2013 WY_{129}	—	November 27, 2013	Haleakala	Pan-STARRS 1	TEL	940 m	MPC · JPL
782065	2013 WE_{131}	—	November 26, 2013	Haleakala	Pan-STARRS 1	·	1.4 km	MPC · JPL
782066	2013 WJ_{132}	—	November 26, 2013	Mount Lemmon	Mount Lemmon Survey	EOS	1.4 km	MPC · JPL
782067	2013 WL_{133}	—	November 28, 2013	Mount Lemmon	Mount Lemmon Survey	AGN	770 m	MPC · JPL
782068	2013 WO_{134}	—	November 28, 2013	Mount Lemmon	Mount Lemmon Survey	·	1.9 km	MPC · JPL
782069	2013 WF_{135}	—	November 28, 2013	Mount Lemmon	Mount Lemmon Survey	·	2.2 km	MPC · JPL
782070	2013 WJ_{136}	—	November 26, 2013	Haleakala	Pan-STARRS 1	KOR	1.1 km	MPC · JPL
782071	2013 WE_{137}	—	November 27, 2013	Haleakala	Pan-STARRS 1	·	2.3 km	MPC · JPL
782072	2013 WV_{137}	—	November 28, 2013	Haleakala	Pan-STARRS 1	·	1.4 km	MPC · JPL
782073	2013 WK_{138}	—	November 26, 2013	Mount Lemmon	Mount Lemmon Survey	·	1.1 km	MPC · JPL
782074	2013 WM_{139}	—	November 28, 2013	Mount Lemmon	Mount Lemmon Survey	·	2.1 km	MPC · JPL
782075	2013 WP_{141}	—	November 27, 2013	Haleakala	Pan-STARRS 1	·	1.8 km	MPC · JPL
782076	2013 WJ_{142}	—	November 27, 2013	Haleakala	Pan-STARRS 1	·	1.2 km	MPC · JPL
782077	2013 WS_{144}	—	November 28, 2013	Mount Lemmon	Mount Lemmon Survey	·	1.6 km	MPC · JPL
782078	2013 WX_{145}	—	November 27, 2013	Haleakala	Pan-STARRS 1	EOS	1.1 km	MPC · JPL
782079	2013 WE_{146}	—	November 27, 2013	Haleakala	Pan-STARRS 1	·	1.3 km	MPC · JPL
782080	2013 WF_{146}	—	November 28, 2013	Mount Lemmon	Mount Lemmon Survey	·	1.9 km	MPC · JPL
782081	2013 WG_{146}	—	November 28, 2013	Mount Lemmon	Mount Lemmon Survey	·	1.5 km	MPC · JPL
782082	2013 WT_{146}	—	November 26, 2013	Haleakala	Pan-STARRS 1	EOS	1.2 km	MPC · JPL
782083	2013 WC_{150}	—	November 28, 2013	Mount Lemmon	Mount Lemmon Survey	·	1.4 km	MPC · JPL
782084	2013 WF_{150}	—	November 28, 2013	Mount Lemmon	Mount Lemmon Survey	·	730 m	MPC · JPL
782085	2013 XJ_{13}	—	December 7, 2013	Mount Lemmon	Mount Lemmon Survey	·	1.7 km	MPC · JPL
782086	2013 XO_{16}	—	December 10, 2013	Mount Lemmon	Mount Lemmon Survey	·	2.2 km	MPC · JPL
782087	2013 XB_{25}	—	December 4, 2013	Haleakala	Pan-STARRS 1	T_{j} (2.96)	2.7 km	MPC · JPL
782088	2013 XJ_{25}	—	November 27, 2013	Haleakala	Pan-STARRS 1	·	2.6 km	MPC · JPL
782089	2013 XV_{33}	—	July 26, 2017	Haleakala	Pan-STARRS 1	·	1.5 km	MPC · JPL
782090	2013 XA_{34}	—	December 13, 2013	Mount Lemmon	Mount Lemmon Survey	·	1.9 km	MPC · JPL
782091	2013 XH_{34}	—	June 25, 2017	Haleakala	Pan-STARRS 1	·	1.6 km	MPC · JPL
782092	2013 XY_{34}	—	December 11, 2013	Haleakala	Pan-STARRS 1	EOS	1.3 km	MPC · JPL
782093	2013 XB_{35}	—	December 6, 2013	Haleakala	Pan-STARRS 1	·	1.8 km	MPC · JPL
782094	2013 XK_{35}	—	December 14, 2013	Mount Lemmon	Mount Lemmon Survey	·	1.9 km	MPC · JPL
782095	2013 XN_{35}	—	December 11, 2013	Haleakala	Pan-STARRS 1	·	1.7 km	MPC · JPL
782096	2013 XO_{35}	—	December 11, 2013	Haleakala	Pan-STARRS 1	VER	1.8 km	MPC · JPL
782097	2013 XT_{35}	—	December 15, 2013	Haleakala	Pan-STARRS 1	TIR	2.1 km	MPC · JPL
782098	2013 XA_{37}	—	December 11, 2013	Haleakala	Pan-STARRS 1	·	2.1 km	MPC · JPL
782099	2013 XQ_{37}	—	October 14, 2007	Mount Lemmon	Mount Lemmon Survey	EOS	1.1 km	MPC · JPL
782100	2013 XG_{38}	—	December 3, 2013	Mount Lemmon	Mount Lemmon Survey	·	1.5 km	MPC · JPL

== 782101–782200 ==
back to top

Designation			Discovery			Properties		Ref
Permanent	Provisional	Named after	Date	Site	Discoverer(s)	Category	Diam.	Ref
782101	2013 XB_{41}	—	December 4, 2013	Haleakala	Pan-STARRS 1	·	1.8 km	MPC · JPL
782102	2013 XM_{41}	—	December 6, 2013	Haleakala	Pan-STARRS 1	·	1.7 km	MPC · JPL
782103	2013 XE_{42}	—	December 14, 2013	Mount Lemmon	Mount Lemmon Survey	·	2.0 km	MPC · JPL
782104	2013 XN_{42}	—	December 14, 2013	Mount Lemmon	Mount Lemmon Survey	KOR	1.2 km	MPC · JPL
782105	2013 XU_{42}	—	December 11, 2013	Haleakala	Pan-STARRS 1	·	1.3 km	MPC · JPL
782106	2013 XW_{42}	—	September 16, 2012	Mount Lemmon	Mount Lemmon Survey	·	1.5 km	MPC · JPL
782107	2013 XT_{44}	—	December 11, 2013	Haleakala	Pan-STARRS 1	T_{j} (2.99)	2.1 km	MPC · JPL
782108	2013 YU_{1}	—	December 11, 2013	Mount Lemmon	Mount Lemmon Survey	THM	1.5 km	MPC · JPL
782109	2013 YG_{6}	—	December 11, 2013	Haleakala	Pan-STARRS 1	·	1.9 km	MPC · JPL
782110	2013 YL_{9}	—	October 22, 2008	Kitt Peak	Spacewatch	·	1.2 km	MPC · JPL
782111	2013 YV_{28}	—	December 14, 2013	Mount Lemmon	Mount Lemmon Survey	·	2.0 km	MPC · JPL
782112	2013 YV_{30}	—	January 28, 2003	Mount Graham	Ryan, W.	HYG	1.9 km	MPC · JPL
782113	2013 YE_{34}	—	December 26, 2013	Mount Lemmon	Mount Lemmon Survey	(1547)	1.1 km	MPC · JPL
782114	2013 YU_{47}	—	December 28, 2013	Kitt Peak	Spacewatch	·	2.0 km	MPC · JPL
782115	2013 YD_{56}	—	November 28, 2013	Mount Lemmon	Mount Lemmon Survey	T_{j} (2.96)	2.7 km	MPC · JPL
782116	2013 YV_{56}	—	December 26, 2013	Haleakala	Pan-STARRS 1	EOS	1.5 km	MPC · JPL
782117	2013 YD_{57}	—	December 4, 2013	Haleakala	Pan-STARRS 1	MAR	750 m	MPC · JPL
782118	2013 YN_{60}	—	December 27, 2013	Kitt Peak	Spacewatch	·	2.2 km	MPC · JPL
782119	2013 YX_{75}	—	December 26, 2013	Mount Lemmon	Mount Lemmon Survey	·	2.0 km	MPC · JPL
782120	2013 YN_{76}	—	December 27, 2013	Kitt Peak	Spacewatch	HYG	1.6 km	MPC · JPL
782121	2013 YU_{76}	—	October 10, 2012	Mount Lemmon	Mount Lemmon Survey	·	2.1 km	MPC · JPL
782122	2013 YY_{79}	—	February 3, 2009	Kitt Peak	Spacewatch	·	1.7 km	MPC · JPL
782123	2013 YE_{80}	—	December 28, 2013	Kitt Peak	Spacewatch	·	1.7 km	MPC · JPL
782124	2013 YN_{81}	—	December 28, 2013	Kitt Peak	Spacewatch	·	1.7 km	MPC · JPL
782125	2013 YY_{82}	—	December 24, 2013	Mount Lemmon	Mount Lemmon Survey	·	1.9 km	MPC · JPL
782126	2013 YT_{83}	—	December 28, 2013	Kitt Peak	Spacewatch	·	1.5 km	MPC · JPL
782127	2013 YG_{84}	—	December 26, 2013	Mount Lemmon	Mount Lemmon Survey	·	3.2 km	MPC · JPL
782128	2013 YL_{84}	—	February 21, 2009	Kitt Peak	Spacewatch	·	1.7 km	MPC · JPL
782129	2013 YQ_{85}	—	December 28, 2013	Kitt Peak	Spacewatch	·	2.2 km	MPC · JPL
782130	2013 YA_{86}	—	December 28, 2013	Kitt Peak	Spacewatch	·	1.2 km	MPC · JPL
782131	2013 YT_{87}	—	February 15, 2010	Mount Lemmon	Mount Lemmon Survey	EUN	980 m	MPC · JPL
782132	2013 YD_{89}	—	December 28, 2013	Kitt Peak	Spacewatch	HYG	1.8 km	MPC · JPL
782133	2013 YK_{89}	—	December 28, 2013	Kitt Peak	Spacewatch	THM	1.7 km	MPC · JPL
782134	2013 YK_{97}	—	December 13, 2013	Mount Lemmon	Mount Lemmon Survey	EUP	3.0 km	MPC · JPL
782135	2013 YC_{98}	—	December 31, 2013	Kitt Peak	Spacewatch	·	2.1 km	MPC · JPL
782136	2013 YL_{101}	—	December 31, 2013	Mount Lemmon	Mount Lemmon Survey	·	1.8 km	MPC · JPL
782137	2013 YV_{104}	—	December 28, 2013	Mount Lemmon	Mount Lemmon Survey	·	1.8 km	MPC · JPL
782138	2013 YO_{108}	—	December 31, 2013	Kitt Peak	Spacewatch	·	1.5 km	MPC · JPL
782139	2013 YA_{115}	—	December 30, 2013	Kitt Peak	Spacewatch	·	1.8 km	MPC · JPL
782140	2013 YD_{116}	—	September 27, 2001	Anderson Mesa	LONEOS	·	3.1 km	MPC · JPL
782141	2013 YR_{126}	—	December 31, 2013	Mount Lemmon	Mount Lemmon Survey	·	1.6 km	MPC · JPL
782142	2013 YG_{129}	—	December 31, 2013	Kitt Peak	Spacewatch	·	1.7 km	MPC · JPL
782143	2013 YH_{132}	—	December 31, 2013	Mount Lemmon	Mount Lemmon Survey	·	1.5 km	MPC · JPL
782144	2013 YH_{135}	—	December 31, 2013	Mount Lemmon	Mount Lemmon Survey	EOS	1.6 km	MPC · JPL
782145	2013 YO_{135}	—	December 31, 2013	Mount Lemmon	Mount Lemmon Survey	·	1.7 km	MPC · JPL
782146	2013 YQ_{135}	—	December 31, 2013	Mount Lemmon	Mount Lemmon Survey	·	1.7 km	MPC · JPL
782147	2013 YN_{136}	—	December 31, 2013	Mount Lemmon	Mount Lemmon Survey	·	2.2 km	MPC · JPL
782148	2013 YE_{137}	—	December 31, 2013	Mount Lemmon	Mount Lemmon Survey	·	1.9 km	MPC · JPL
782149	2013 YR_{141}	—	December 31, 2013	Mount Lemmon	Mount Lemmon Survey	·	2.4 km	MPC · JPL
782150	2013 YW_{142}	—	December 14, 2013	Mount Lemmon	Mount Lemmon Survey	·	1.6 km	MPC · JPL
782151	2013 YF_{143}	—	November 28, 2013	Mount Lemmon	Mount Lemmon Survey	·	2.1 km	MPC · JPL
782152	2013 YH_{145}	—	December 31, 2013	Mount Lemmon	Mount Lemmon Survey	EOS	1.2 km	MPC · JPL
782153	2013 YF_{146}	—	December 31, 2013	Mount Lemmon	Mount Lemmon Survey	·	1.6 km	MPC · JPL
782154	2013 YO_{147}	—	December 31, 2013	Kitt Peak	Spacewatch	(1118)	2.1 km	MPC · JPL
782155	2013 YO_{151}	—	December 24, 2013	Mount Lemmon	Mount Lemmon Survey	·	1.8 km	MPC · JPL
782156	2013 YL_{153}	—	December 30, 2013	Mount Lemmon	Mount Lemmon Survey	·	2.0 km	MPC · JPL
782157	2013 YM_{155}	—	December 28, 2013	Kitt Peak	Spacewatch	·	1.7 km	MPC · JPL
782158	2013 YC_{158}	—	December 30, 2013	Kitt Peak	Spacewatch	·	1.3 km	MPC · JPL
782159	2013 YO_{158}	—	December 30, 2013	Mount Lemmon	Mount Lemmon Survey	·	1.9 km	MPC · JPL
782160	2013 YE_{159}	—	May 6, 2016	Haleakala	Pan-STARRS 1	·	2.2 km	MPC · JPL
782161	2013 YA_{161}	—	December 31, 2013	Kitt Peak	Spacewatch	·	1.9 km	MPC · JPL
782162	2013 YK_{161}	—	April 25, 2015	Haleakala	Pan-STARRS 1	·	1.2 km	MPC · JPL
782163	2013 YN_{161}	—	December 31, 2013	Mount Lemmon	Mount Lemmon Survey	·	1.7 km	MPC · JPL
782164	2013 YZ_{161}	—	December 31, 2013	Haleakala	Pan-STARRS 1	·	1.3 km	MPC · JPL
782165	2013 YF_{162}	—	December 27, 2013	Mount Lemmon	Mount Lemmon Survey	·	2.2 km	MPC · JPL
782166	2013 YH_{162}	—	December 24, 2013	Mount Lemmon	Mount Lemmon Survey	·	820 m	MPC · JPL
782167	2013 YT_{162}	—	December 31, 2013	Mount Lemmon	Mount Lemmon Survey	·	1.4 km	MPC · JPL
782168	2013 YB_{163}	—	December 24, 2013	Mount Lemmon	Mount Lemmon Survey	TEL	1.1 km	MPC · JPL
782169	2013 YH_{163}	—	December 25, 2013	Kitt Peak	Spacewatch	·	1.8 km	MPC · JPL
782170	2013 YN_{163}	—	December 31, 2013	Haleakala	Pan-STARRS 1	TIR	2.2 km	MPC · JPL
782171	2013 YM_{164}	—	December 24, 2013	Mount Lemmon	Mount Lemmon Survey	·	1.2 km	MPC · JPL
782172	2013 YM_{166}	—	December 31, 2013	Kitt Peak	Spacewatch	·	1.6 km	MPC · JPL
782173	2013 YP_{167}	—	December 25, 2013	Mount Lemmon	Mount Lemmon Survey	·	2.0 km	MPC · JPL
782174	2013 YX_{167}	—	December 30, 2013	Kitt Peak	Spacewatch	·	2.2 km	MPC · JPL
782175	2013 YB_{168}	—	December 31, 2013	Haleakala	Pan-STARRS 1	·	1.9 km	MPC · JPL
782176	2013 YL_{168}	—	December 29, 2013	Haleakala	Pan-STARRS 1	·	1.7 km	MPC · JPL
782177	2013 YO_{168}	—	December 31, 2013	Mount Lemmon	Mount Lemmon Survey	·	1.6 km	MPC · JPL
782178	2013 YP_{168}	—	December 25, 2013	Kitt Peak	Spacewatch	·	1.5 km	MPC · JPL
782179	2013 YG_{170}	—	December 31, 2013	Kitt Peak	Spacewatch	·	2.0 km	MPC · JPL
782180	2013 YO_{170}	—	December 30, 2013	Kitt Peak	Spacewatch	EOS	1.3 km	MPC · JPL
782181	2013 YP_{171}	—	December 31, 2013	Mount Lemmon	Mount Lemmon Survey	·	1.6 km	MPC · JPL
782182	2013 YQ_{171}	—	February 28, 2009	Kitt Peak	Spacewatch	·	1.7 km	MPC · JPL
782183	2013 YU_{171}	—	December 30, 2013	Mount Lemmon	Mount Lemmon Survey	·	2.2 km	MPC · JPL
782184	2013 YV_{171}	—	December 30, 2013	Mount Lemmon	Mount Lemmon Survey	·	2.0 km	MPC · JPL
782185	2013 YP_{174}	—	December 28, 2013	Mount Lemmon	Mount Lemmon Survey	·	2.2 km	MPC · JPL
782186	2014 AY_{4}	—	January 1, 2014	Haleakala	Pan-STARRS 1	·	1.1 km	MPC · JPL
782187	2014 AZ_{4}	—	October 9, 2012	Mount Lemmon	Mount Lemmon Survey	·	1.3 km	MPC · JPL
782188	2014 AE_{6}	—	January 1, 2014	Haleakala	Pan-STARRS 1	·	2.1 km	MPC · JPL
782189	2014 AW_{10}	—	December 3, 2005	Mauna Kea	A. Boattini	·	1.0 km	MPC · JPL
782190	2014 AY_{10}	—	August 25, 2012	Haleakala	Pan-STARRS 1	LIX	2.4 km	MPC · JPL
782191	2014 AK_{11}	—	January 1, 2014	Mount Lemmon	Mount Lemmon Survey	·	2.1 km	MPC · JPL
782192	2014 AA_{14}	—	January 1, 2014	Mount Lemmon	Mount Lemmon Survey	·	1.1 km	MPC · JPL
782193	2014 AS_{18}	—	March 2, 2009	Kitt Peak	Spacewatch	·	1.6 km	MPC · JPL
782194	2014 AF_{20}	—	November 28, 2013	Kitt Peak	Spacewatch	·	1.4 km	MPC · JPL
782195	2014 AS_{22}	—	November 28, 2013	Kitt Peak	Spacewatch	TIR	1.8 km	MPC · JPL
782196	2014 AE_{23}	—	January 3, 2014	Kitt Peak	Spacewatch	EOS	1.3 km	MPC · JPL
782197	2014 AA_{24}	—	September 24, 2008	Catalina	CSS	·	1.0 km	MPC · JPL
782198	2014 AC_{30}	—	January 3, 2014	Mount Lemmon	Mount Lemmon Survey	·	1.9 km	MPC · JPL
782199	2014 AM_{30}	—	January 3, 2014	Mount Lemmon	Mount Lemmon Survey	·	1.9 km	MPC · JPL
782200	2014 AO_{30}	—	January 3, 2014	Mount Lemmon	Mount Lemmon Survey	·	910 m	MPC · JPL

== 782201–782300 ==
back to top

Designation			Discovery			Properties		Ref
Permanent	Provisional	Named after	Date	Site	Discoverer(s)	Category	Diam.	Ref
782201	2014 AQ_{31}	—	January 4, 2014	Mount Lemmon	Mount Lemmon Survey	·	2.5 km	MPC · JPL
782202	2014 AB_{34}	—	December 25, 2013	Mount Lemmon	Mount Lemmon Survey	·	1.8 km	MPC · JPL
782203	2014 AA_{39}	—	November 9, 2007	Mount Lemmon	Mount Lemmon Survey	·	1.6 km	MPC · JPL
782204	2014 AN_{41}	—	January 5, 2014	Kitt Peak	Spacewatch	·	2.1 km	MPC · JPL
782205	2014 AG_{48}	—	October 20, 2012	Mount Lemmon	Mount Lemmon Survey	·	2.1 km	MPC · JPL
782206	2014 AA_{55}	—	January 13, 2014	Mount Lemmon	Mount Lemmon Survey	·	2.4 km	MPC · JPL
782207	2014 AE_{58}	—	November 3, 2007	Kitt Peak	Spacewatch	·	1.7 km	MPC · JPL
782208	2014 AH_{63}	—	January 9, 2014	Mount Lemmon	Mount Lemmon Survey	DOR	1.5 km	MPC · JPL
782209	2014 AL_{63}	—	January 13, 2014	Mount Lemmon	Mount Lemmon Survey	·	2.2 km	MPC · JPL
782210	2014 AM_{64}	—	December 30, 2013	Mount Lemmon	Mount Lemmon Survey	·	2.0 km	MPC · JPL
782211	2014 AE_{65}	—	January 10, 2014	Kitt Peak	Spacewatch	·	2.6 km	MPC · JPL
782212	2014 AN_{65}	—	June 5, 2016	Haleakala	Pan-STARRS 1	·	1.6 km	MPC · JPL
782213	2014 AD_{68}	—	January 1, 2014	Kitt Peak	Spacewatch	THB	2.1 km	MPC · JPL
782214	2014 AU_{68}	—	January 1, 2014	Kitt Peak	Spacewatch	EOS	1.4 km	MPC · JPL
782215	2014 AV_{68}	—	January 9, 2014	Haleakala	Pan-STARRS 1	TIR	2.2 km	MPC · JPL
782216	2014 AV_{69}	—	January 2, 2014	Mount Lemmon	Mount Lemmon Survey	·	2.8 km	MPC · JPL
782217	2014 AJ_{70}	—	January 1, 2014	Haleakala	Pan-STARRS 1	·	1.5 km	MPC · JPL
782218	2014 AR_{70}	—	January 1, 2014	Kitt Peak	Spacewatch	THM	1.7 km	MPC · JPL
782219	2014 AD_{71}	—	January 10, 2014	Mount Lemmon	Mount Lemmon Survey	·	1.8 km	MPC · JPL
782220	2014 AP_{71}	—	January 2, 2014	Kitt Peak	Spacewatch	·	1.5 km	MPC · JPL
782221	2014 AR_{71}	—	January 9, 2014	Mount Lemmon	Mount Lemmon Survey	·	2.4 km	MPC · JPL
782222	2014 AE_{73}	—	January 9, 2014	Mount Lemmon	Mount Lemmon Survey	EUN	820 m	MPC · JPL
782223	2014 AF_{74}	—	January 9, 2014	Mount Lemmon	Mount Lemmon Survey	·	2.1 km	MPC · JPL
782224	2014 AR_{74}	—	November 19, 2007	Kitt Peak	Spacewatch	·	1.9 km	MPC · JPL
782225	2014 AP_{75}	—	January 9, 2014	Haleakala	Pan-STARRS 1	EOS	1.4 km	MPC · JPL
782226	2014 AV_{75}	—	December 31, 2007	Mount Lemmon	Mount Lemmon Survey	·	2.7 km	MPC · JPL
782227	2014 AW_{75}	—	January 11, 2014	Kitt Peak	Spacewatch	·	2.0 km	MPC · JPL
782228	2014 AE_{78}	—	January 9, 2014	Haleakala	Pan-STARRS 1	·	2.3 km	MPC · JPL
782229	2014 AV_{78}	—	January 3, 2014	Mount Lemmon	Mount Lemmon Survey	·	1.7 km	MPC · JPL
782230	2014 AF_{80}	—	January 3, 2014	Mount Lemmon	Mount Lemmon Survey	EOS	1.3 km	MPC · JPL
782231	2014 AH_{80}	—	January 9, 2014	Mount Lemmon	Mount Lemmon Survey	VER	1.8 km	MPC · JPL
782232	2014 AA_{81}	—	January 3, 2014	Kitt Peak	Spacewatch	·	2.2 km	MPC · JPL
782233	2014 BY_{1}	—	January 1, 2014	Haleakala	Pan-STARRS 1	EOS	1.4 km	MPC · JPL
782234	2014 BP_{2}	—	January 20, 2014	Mount Lemmon	Mount Lemmon Survey	·	1.5 km	MPC · JPL
782235	2014 BU_{6}	—	October 10, 2012	Mount Lemmon	Mount Lemmon Survey	·	1.9 km	MPC · JPL
782236	2014 BC_{7}	—	February 24, 2009	Mount Lemmon	Mount Lemmon Survey	EOS	1.4 km	MPC · JPL
782237	2014 BS_{7}	—	January 21, 2014	Mount Lemmon	Mount Lemmon Survey	·	1.8 km	MPC · JPL
782238	2014 BT_{10}	—	January 7, 2014	Kitt Peak	Spacewatch	TRE	1.8 km	MPC · JPL
782239	2014 BH_{11}	—	October 18, 2012	Haleakala	Pan-STARRS 1	·	1.9 km	MPC · JPL
782240	2014 BB_{13}	—	January 2, 2014	Kitt Peak	Spacewatch	·	1.8 km	MPC · JPL
782241	2014 BE_{18}	—	January 21, 2014	Kitt Peak	Spacewatch	(5)	910 m	MPC · JPL
782242	2014 BM_{18}	—	January 21, 2014	Mount Lemmon	Mount Lemmon Survey	·	1.8 km	MPC · JPL
782243	2014 BU_{23}	—	January 12, 2014	Mount Lemmon	Mount Lemmon Survey	·	1.9 km	MPC · JPL
782244	2014 BM_{26}	—	December 25, 2013	Mount Lemmon	Mount Lemmon Survey	T_{j} (2.98) · EUP	2.7 km	MPC · JPL
782245	2014 BG_{30}	—	March 21, 2009	Mount Lemmon	Mount Lemmon Survey	HYG	2.0 km	MPC · JPL
782246	2014 BZ_{30}	—	January 23, 2014	Mount Lemmon	Mount Lemmon Survey	EUN	920 m	MPC · JPL
782247	2014 BH_{34}	—	January 21, 2014	Kitt Peak	Spacewatch	·	2.2 km	MPC · JPL
782248	2014 BJ_{40}	—	February 1, 2009	Kitt Peak	Spacewatch	·	1.2 km	MPC · JPL
782249	2014 BN_{40}	—	January 24, 2014	Haleakala	Pan-STARRS 1	·	880 m	MPC · JPL
782250	2014 BE_{41}	—	January 24, 2014	Haleakala	Pan-STARRS 1	·	1.9 km	MPC · JPL
782251	2014 BJ_{42}	—	January 24, 2014	Haleakala	Pan-STARRS 1	·	880 m	MPC · JPL
782252	2014 BP_{44}	—	December 30, 2013	Mount Lemmon	Mount Lemmon Survey	EOS	1.5 km	MPC · JPL
782253	2014 BW_{45}	—	October 10, 2012	Mount Lemmon	Mount Lemmon Survey	EOS	1.4 km	MPC · JPL
782254	2014 BB_{48}	—	January 23, 2014	Mount Lemmon	Mount Lemmon Survey	·	2.2 km	MPC · JPL
782255	2014 BL_{49}	—	September 25, 2012	Mount Lemmon	Mount Lemmon Survey	·	1.7 km	MPC · JPL
782256	2014 BX_{63}	—	November 3, 2007	Kitt Peak	Spacewatch	·	1.5 km	MPC · JPL
782257	2014 BQ_{67}	—	January 24, 2014	Haleakala	Pan-STARRS 1	·	1.8 km	MPC · JPL
782258	2014 BN_{68}	—	January 26, 2014	Haleakala	Pan-STARRS 1	·	1.8 km	MPC · JPL
782259	2014 BF_{69}	—	January 29, 2014	Kitt Peak	Spacewatch	·	830 m	MPC · JPL
782260	2014 BB_{71}	—	August 9, 2016	Haleakala	Pan-STARRS 1	·	870 m	MPC · JPL
782261	2014 BS_{71}	—	January 28, 2014	Mount Lemmon	Mount Lemmon Survey	EOS	1.5 km	MPC · JPL
782262	2014 BE_{73}	—	January 21, 2014	Mount Lemmon	Mount Lemmon Survey	·	2.1 km	MPC · JPL
782263	2014 BO_{73}	—	January 24, 2014	Haleakala	Pan-STARRS 1	EOS	1.5 km	MPC · JPL
782264	2014 BP_{74}	—	January 21, 2014	Mount Lemmon	Mount Lemmon Survey	·	2.1 km	MPC · JPL
782265	2014 BZ_{74}	—	January 28, 2014	Mount Lemmon	Mount Lemmon Survey	TIR	1.9 km	MPC · JPL
782266	2014 BN_{75}	—	January 23, 2014	Mount Lemmon	Mount Lemmon Survey	·	1.9 km	MPC · JPL
782267	2014 BQ_{76}	—	January 31, 2014	Haleakala	Pan-STARRS 1	·	1.8 km	MPC · JPL
782268	2014 BM_{77}	—	January 20, 2014	Mount Lemmon	Mount Lemmon Survey	THM	1.5 km	MPC · JPL
782269	2014 BN_{77}	—	January 24, 2014	Haleakala	Pan-STARRS 1	MIS	1.6 km	MPC · JPL
782270	2014 BU_{77}	—	January 31, 2014	Haleakala	Pan-STARRS 1	·	2.0 km	MPC · JPL
782271	2014 BZ_{77}	—	January 24, 2014	Haleakala	Pan-STARRS 1	·	2.1 km	MPC · JPL
782272	2014 BA_{78}	—	January 28, 2014	Mount Lemmon	Mount Lemmon Survey	LIX	2.4 km	MPC · JPL
782273	2014 BF_{78}	—	January 20, 2014	Mount Lemmon	Mount Lemmon Survey	·	2.4 km	MPC · JPL
782274	2014 BG_{78}	—	January 28, 2014	Mount Lemmon	Mount Lemmon Survey	·	1.7 km	MPC · JPL
782275	2014 BH_{78}	—	January 25, 2014	Haleakala	Pan-STARRS 1	·	1.1 km	MPC · JPL
782276	2014 BN_{78}	—	January 28, 2014	Mount Lemmon	Mount Lemmon Survey	URS	2.7 km	MPC · JPL
782277	2014 BD_{79}	—	January 25, 2014	Haleakala	Pan-STARRS 1	EOS	1.3 km	MPC · JPL
782278	2014 BE_{79}	—	January 24, 2014	Haleakala	Pan-STARRS 1	KOR	900 m	MPC · JPL
782279	2014 BM_{81}	—	January 23, 2014	Mount Lemmon	Mount Lemmon Survey	·	2.2 km	MPC · JPL
782280	2014 BL_{83}	—	January 29, 2014	Catalina	CSS	THB	1.9 km	MPC · JPL
782281	2014 BY_{83}	—	January 24, 2014	Haleakala	Pan-STARRS 1	·	2.1 km	MPC · JPL
782282	2014 BH_{84}	—	January 28, 2014	Mount Lemmon	Mount Lemmon Survey	·	2.0 km	MPC · JPL
782283	2014 BJ_{84}	—	January 28, 2014	Mount Lemmon	Mount Lemmon Survey	EOS	1.5 km	MPC · JPL
782284	2014 BK_{84}	—	January 28, 2014	Mount Lemmon	Mount Lemmon Survey	·	2.3 km	MPC · JPL
782285	2014 BU_{84}	—	January 24, 2014	Haleakala	Pan-STARRS 1	THM	1.4 km	MPC · JPL
782286	2014 BL_{85}	—	January 26, 2014	Haleakala	Pan-STARRS 1	·	2.0 km	MPC · JPL
782287	2014 BN_{85}	—	January 26, 2014	Haleakala	Pan-STARRS 1	EUP	2.3 km	MPC · JPL
782288	2014 BY_{85}	—	January 23, 2014	Mount Lemmon	Mount Lemmon Survey	·	1.3 km	MPC · JPL
782289	2014 BR_{87}	—	January 29, 2014	Kitt Peak	Spacewatch	L4	5.3 km	MPC · JPL
782290	2014 BE_{88}	—	October 15, 2012	Haleakala	Pan-STARRS 1	·	1.7 km	MPC · JPL
782291	2014 BP_{88}	—	January 28, 2014	Mount Lemmon	Mount Lemmon Survey	·	1.9 km	MPC · JPL
782292	2014 BU_{89}	—	January 21, 2014	Mount Lemmon	Mount Lemmon Survey	·	2.2 km	MPC · JPL
782293	2014 BW_{89}	—	January 26, 2014	Haleakala	Pan-STARRS 1	·	2.6 km	MPC · JPL
782294	2014 BX_{89}	—	January 24, 2014	Haleakala	Pan-STARRS 1	·	2.3 km	MPC · JPL
782295	2014 BY_{89}	—	September 19, 2011	Mount Lemmon	Mount Lemmon Survey	·	2.0 km	MPC · JPL
782296	2014 BA_{90}	—	January 28, 2014	Mount Lemmon	Mount Lemmon Survey	·	1.8 km	MPC · JPL
782297	2014 BE_{90}	—	January 26, 2014	Haleakala	Pan-STARRS 1	L4	6.3 km	MPC · JPL
782298	2014 BP_{91}	—	January 21, 2014	Mount Lemmon	Mount Lemmon Survey	·	1.5 km	MPC · JPL
782299	2014 BZ_{91}	—	January 26, 2014	Haleakala	Pan-STARRS 1	·	1.8 km	MPC · JPL
782300	2014 BB_{92}	—	January 29, 2014	Kitt Peak	Spacewatch	·	1.8 km	MPC · JPL

== 782301–782400 ==
back to top

Designation			Discovery			Properties		Ref
Permanent	Provisional	Named after	Date	Site	Discoverer(s)	Category	Diam.	Ref
782301	2014 CJ	—	January 25, 2014	Haleakala	Pan-STARRS 1	·	2.5 km	MPC · JPL
782302	2014 CJ_{1}	—	January 24, 2014	Haleakala	Pan-STARRS 1	·	1.6 km	MPC · JPL
782303	2014 CL_{1}	—	February 2, 2014	Mount Lemmon	Mount Lemmon Survey	·	2.5 km	MPC · JPL
782304	2014 CF_{2}	—	January 25, 2014	Haleakala	Pan-STARRS 1	·	2.1 km	MPC · JPL
782305	2014 CV_{2}	—	February 5, 2014	Elena Remote	Oreshko, A.	EUP	2.3 km	MPC · JPL
782306	2014 CA_{6}	—	January 24, 2014	Haleakala	Pan-STARRS 1	·	1.9 km	MPC · JPL
782307	2014 CL_{7}	—	February 5, 2014	Kitt Peak	Spacewatch	·	1.1 km	MPC · JPL
782308	2014 CF_{15}	—	February 6, 2014	Oukaïmeden	C. Rinner	·	830 m	MPC · JPL
782309	2014 CB_{19}	—	April 14, 2010	Mount Lemmon	Mount Lemmon Survey	·	1.3 km	MPC · JPL
782310	2014 CJ_{20}	—	January 9, 2014	Haleakala	Pan-STARRS 1	·	1.5 km	MPC · JPL
782311	2014 CN_{24}	—	February 10, 2014	Haleakala	Pan-STARRS 1	EUN	930 m	MPC · JPL
782312	2014 CP_{24}	—	February 10, 2014	Haleakala	Pan-STARRS 1	·	1.5 km	MPC · JPL
782313	2014 CQ_{25}	—	February 9, 2014	Kitt Peak	Spacewatch	·	1.3 km	MPC · JPL
782314	2014 CF_{26}	—	January 15, 2008	Kitt Peak	Spacewatch	·	2.1 km	MPC · JPL
782315	2014 CG_{26}	—	February 10, 2014	Haleakala	Pan-STARRS 1	·	990 m	MPC · JPL
782316	2014 CW_{29}	—	February 10, 2014	Haleakala	Pan-STARRS 1	·	1.9 km	MPC · JPL
782317	2014 CD_{31}	—	February 10, 2014	Mount Lemmon	Mount Lemmon Survey	·	2.2 km	MPC · JPL
782318	2014 CL_{31}	—	February 9, 2014	Mount Lemmon	Mount Lemmon Survey	THM	1.9 km	MPC · JPL
782319	2014 CP_{31}	—	February 10, 2014	Haleakala	Pan-STARRS 1	·	2.8 km	MPC · JPL
782320	2014 CU_{31}	—	February 11, 2014	Mount Lemmon	Mount Lemmon Survey	·	2.0 km	MPC · JPL
782321	2014 CY_{31}	—	February 10, 2014	Haleakala	Pan-STARRS 1	·	2.2 km	MPC · JPL
782322	2014 CA_{32}	—	February 9, 2014	Mount Lemmon	Mount Lemmon Survey	·	2.1 km	MPC · JPL
782323	2014 CB_{32}	—	February 9, 2014	Haleakala	Pan-STARRS 1	EUP	2.5 km	MPC · JPL
782324	2014 CG_{32}	—	February 6, 2014	Mount Lemmon	Mount Lemmon Survey	·	1.4 km	MPC · JPL
782325	2014 CM_{33}	—	February 9, 2014	Mount Lemmon	Mount Lemmon Survey	·	2.1 km	MPC · JPL
782326	2014 CO_{33}	—	February 10, 2014	Haleakala	Pan-STARRS 1	EUN	1.0 km	MPC · JPL
782327	2014 CT_{33}	—	February 5, 2014	Mount Lemmon	Mount Lemmon Survey	·	1.8 km	MPC · JPL
782328	2014 CW_{33}	—	February 9, 2014	Mount Lemmon	Mount Lemmon Survey	THM	1.7 km	MPC · JPL
782329	2014 CP_{35}	—	February 6, 2014	Mount Lemmon	Mount Lemmon Survey	·	1.4 km	MPC · JPL
782330	2014 CN_{36}	—	February 11, 2014	Mount Lemmon	Mount Lemmon Survey	JUN	650 m	MPC · JPL
782331	2014 CX_{36}	—	February 10, 2014	Kitt Peak	Spacewatch	·	1.8 km	MPC · JPL
782332	2014 CU_{37}	—	February 10, 2014	Mount Lemmon	Mount Lemmon Survey	·	2.0 km	MPC · JPL
782333	2014 CV_{37}	—	February 10, 2014	Mount Lemmon	Mount Lemmon Survey	TIR	1.8 km	MPC · JPL
782334	2014 CB_{38}	—	February 1, 2014	Mount Teide	A. Knöfel	·	2.0 km	MPC · JPL
782335	2014 DR_{4}	—	January 1, 2014	Mount Lemmon	Mount Lemmon Survey	·	1.8 km	MPC · JPL
782336	2014 DV_{13}	—	February 20, 2014	Haleakala	Pan-STARRS 1	·	2.3 km	MPC · JPL
782337	2014 DL_{17}	—	January 25, 2014	Haleakala	Pan-STARRS 1	·	2.1 km	MPC · JPL
782338	2014 DN_{17}	—	February 22, 2014	Haleakala	Pan-STARRS 1	LIX	2.7 km	MPC · JPL
782339	2014 DT_{19}	—	February 7, 2003	Kitt Peak	Spacewatch	·	2.0 km	MPC · JPL
782340	2014 DN_{36}	—	December 30, 2007	Kitt Peak	Spacewatch	·	1.9 km	MPC · JPL
782341	2014 DT_{40}	—	January 23, 2014	Mount Lemmon	Mount Lemmon Survey	·	3.0 km	MPC · JPL
782342	2014 DH_{42}	—	February 25, 2014	Kitt Peak	Spacewatch	·	2.1 km	MPC · JPL
782343	2014 DM_{44}	—	October 29, 2008	Mount Lemmon	Mount Lemmon Survey	·	1.0 km	MPC · JPL
782344	2014 DD_{47}	—	February 27, 2014	Kitt Peak	Spacewatch	·	2.4 km	MPC · JPL
782345	2014 DM_{48}	—	February 26, 2014	Haleakala	Pan-STARRS 1	THM	1.7 km	MPC · JPL
782346	2014 DO_{49}	—	February 26, 2014	Haleakala	Pan-STARRS 1	L4	5.8 km	MPC · JPL
782347	2014 DZ_{52}	—	February 26, 2014	Haleakala	Pan-STARRS 1	·	1.8 km	MPC · JPL
782348	2014 DY_{53}	—	October 12, 2007	Mount Lemmon	Mount Lemmon Survey	·	1.3 km	MPC · JPL
782349	2014 DK_{54}	—	May 11, 2010	Mount Lemmon	Mount Lemmon Survey	·	1.1 km	MPC · JPL
782350	2014 DR_{54}	—	February 26, 2014	Haleakala	Pan-STARRS 1	·	1.7 km	MPC · JPL
782351	2014 DG_{60}	—	February 26, 2014	Haleakala	Pan-STARRS 1	EOS	1.3 km	MPC · JPL
782352	2014 DY_{62}	—	February 20, 2009	Mount Lemmon	Mount Lemmon Survey	·	1.3 km	MPC · JPL
782353	2014 DM_{63}	—	March 25, 2006	Kitt Peak	Spacewatch	·	710 m	MPC · JPL
782354	2014 DX_{69}	—	February 26, 2014	Haleakala	Pan-STARRS 1	·	2.4 km	MPC · JPL
782355	2014 DE_{70}	—	February 26, 2014	Haleakala	Pan-STARRS 1	·	1.3 km	MPC · JPL
782356	2014 DQ_{70}	—	February 20, 2009	Mount Lemmon	Mount Lemmon Survey	·	1.5 km	MPC · JPL
782357	2014 DM_{75}	—	February 26, 2014	Haleakala	Pan-STARRS 1	·	2.1 km	MPC · JPL
782358	2014 DE_{79}	—	February 26, 2014	Haleakala	Pan-STARRS 1	·	2.0 km	MPC · JPL
782359	2014 DA_{80}	—	February 26, 2014	Haleakala	Pan-STARRS 1	·	2.3 km	MPC · JPL
782360	2014 DO_{81}	—	February 22, 2014	Kitt Peak	Spacewatch	MAR	640 m	MPC · JPL
782361	2014 DL_{84}	—	February 25, 2014	Kitt Peak	Spacewatch	·	2.2 km	MPC · JPL
782362	2014 DE_{85}	—	April 2, 2006	Mount Lemmon	Mount Lemmon Survey	EUN	1.1 km	MPC · JPL
782363	2014 DG_{90}	—	October 7, 2012	Haleakala	Pan-STARRS 1	·	1.8 km	MPC · JPL
782364	2014 DH_{94}	—	February 26, 2014	Mount Lemmon	Mount Lemmon Survey	·	2.1 km	MPC · JPL
782365	2014 DT_{94}	—	September 24, 2009	Mount Lemmon	Mount Lemmon Survey	L4	5.2 km	MPC · JPL
782366	2014 DV_{94}	—	February 9, 2014	Kitt Peak	Spacewatch	·	2.3 km	MPC · JPL
782367	2014 DH_{96}	—	February 26, 2014	Haleakala	Pan-STARRS 1	·	2.3 km	MPC · JPL
782368	2014 DP_{96}	—	February 26, 2014	Haleakala	Pan-STARRS 1	·	2.2 km	MPC · JPL
782369	2014 DG_{102}	—	February 27, 2014	Mount Lemmon	Mount Lemmon Survey	THB	1.7 km	MPC · JPL
782370	2014 DM_{102}	—	February 27, 2014	Mount Lemmon	Mount Lemmon Survey	·	1.7 km	MPC · JPL
782371	2014 DB_{103}	—	January 14, 2008	Kitt Peak	Spacewatch	·	2.2 km	MPC · JPL
782372	2014 DL_{106}	—	February 27, 2014	Mount Lemmon	Mount Lemmon Survey	KOR	1.1 km	MPC · JPL
782373	2014 DY_{106}	—	July 28, 2011	Haleakala	Pan-STARRS 1	KOR	1.1 km	MPC · JPL
782374	2014 DK_{107}	—	February 27, 2014	Mount Lemmon	Mount Lemmon Survey	·	1.1 km	MPC · JPL
782375	2014 DM_{107}	—	February 27, 2014	Mount Lemmon	Mount Lemmon Survey	(1298)	2.0 km	MPC · JPL
782376	2014 DW_{109}	—	February 27, 2014	Haleakala	Pan-STARRS 1	·	2.0 km	MPC · JPL
782377	2014 DW_{111}	—	October 1, 2011	Kitt Peak	Spacewatch	·	2.7 km	MPC · JPL
782378	2014 DM_{124}	—	February 28, 2014	Haleakala	Pan-STARRS 1	·	1.8 km	MPC · JPL
782379	2014 DH_{126}	—	February 28, 2014	Haleakala	Pan-STARRS 1	·	1.7 km	MPC · JPL
782380	2014 DQ_{128}	—	February 28, 2014	Haleakala	Pan-STARRS 1	·	1.7 km	MPC · JPL
782381	2014 DF_{129}	—	March 8, 2005	Mount Lemmon	Mount Lemmon Survey	·	1.1 km	MPC · JPL
782382	2014 DR_{129}	—	February 28, 2014	Haleakala	Pan-STARRS 1	·	1.9 km	MPC · JPL
782383	2014 DP_{132}	—	February 28, 2014	Haleakala	Pan-STARRS 1	·	1.7 km	MPC · JPL
782384	2014 DY_{133}	—	March 2, 2009	Kitt Peak	Spacewatch	EOS	1.3 km	MPC · JPL
782385	2014 DZ_{135}	—	February 28, 2014	Haleakala	Pan-STARRS 1	·	1.8 km	MPC · JPL
782386	2014 DL_{138}	—	February 28, 2014	Haleakala	Pan-STARRS 1	L4	5.3 km	MPC · JPL
782387	2014 DR_{138}	—	April 26, 2010	Mount Lemmon	Mount Lemmon Survey	·	1.0 km	MPC · JPL
782388	2014 DN_{142}	—	March 8, 2003	Anderson Mesa	LONEOS	·	2.6 km	MPC · JPL
782389	2014 DF_{145}	—	February 28, 2014	Haleakala	Pan-STARRS 1	·	2.4 km	MPC · JPL
782390	2014 DK_{149}	—	February 26, 2014	Haleakala	Pan-STARRS 1	THM	1.5 km	MPC · JPL
782391	2014 DN_{151}	—	February 23, 2009	Calar Alto	F. Hormuth	KOR	1.2 km	MPC · JPL
782392	2014 DT_{153}	—	January 1, 2009	Kitt Peak	Spacewatch	·	1.2 km	MPC · JPL
782393	2014 DB_{154}	—	February 28, 2014	Haleakala	Pan-STARRS 1	·	2.0 km	MPC · JPL
782394	2014 DC_{154}	—	February 28, 2014	Haleakala	Pan-STARRS 1	·	2.4 km	MPC · JPL
782395	2014 DO_{154}	—	February 28, 2014	Haleakala	Pan-STARRS 1	·	1.1 km	MPC · JPL
782396	2014 DZ_{158}	—	February 28, 2014	Haleakala	Pan-STARRS 1	·	810 m	MPC · JPL
782397	2014 DP_{161}	—	February 20, 2014	Mount Lemmon	Mount Lemmon Survey	·	2.2 km	MPC · JPL
782398	2014 DL_{164}	—	February 28, 2014	Haleakala	Pan-STARRS 1	·	1.8 km	MPC · JPL
782399	2014 DM_{164}	—	February 28, 2014	Haleakala	Pan-STARRS 1	·	2.2 km	MPC · JPL
782400	2014 DX_{164}	—	August 9, 2005	Cerro Tololo	Deep Ecliptic Survey	·	2.3 km	MPC · JPL

== 782401–782500 ==
back to top

Designation			Discovery			Properties		Ref
Permanent	Provisional	Named after	Date	Site	Discoverer(s)	Category	Diam.	Ref
782401	2014 DS_{165}	—	February 28, 2014	Haleakala	Pan-STARRS 1	THM	1.6 km	MPC · JPL
782402	2014 DN_{168}	—	February 26, 2014	Haleakala	Pan-STARRS 1	·	2.1 km	MPC · JPL
782403	2014 DJ_{169}	—	February 28, 2014	Haleakala	Pan-STARRS 1	·	1.1 km	MPC · JPL
782404	2014 DP_{169}	—	February 26, 2014	Haleakala	Pan-STARRS 1	·	1.9 km	MPC · JPL
782405	2014 DA_{170}	—	February 28, 2014	Haleakala	Pan-STARRS 1	·	2.2 km	MPC · JPL
782406	2014 DL_{170}	—	February 26, 2014	Haleakala	Pan-STARRS 1	(3460)	1.8 km	MPC · JPL
782407	2014 DM_{170}	—	February 22, 2014	Kitt Peak	Spacewatch	·	1.6 km	MPC · JPL
782408	2014 DO_{170}	—	February 20, 2014	Mount Lemmon	Mount Lemmon Survey	THM	1.3 km	MPC · JPL
782409	2014 DP_{170}	—	February 22, 2014	Kitt Peak	Spacewatch	·	2.4 km	MPC · JPL
782410	2014 DR_{170}	—	February 20, 2014	Mount Lemmon	Mount Lemmon Survey	·	2.2 km	MPC · JPL
782411	2014 DU_{170}	—	February 28, 2014	Mount Lemmon	Mount Lemmon Survey	·	1.7 km	MPC · JPL
782412	2014 DW_{170}	—	February 26, 2014	Haleakala	Pan-STARRS 1	·	1.9 km	MPC · JPL
782413	2014 DD_{171}	—	February 28, 2014	Haleakala	Pan-STARRS 1	·	2.3 km	MPC · JPL
782414	2014 DB_{172}	—	February 26, 2014	Haleakala	Pan-STARRS 1	·	1.8 km	MPC · JPL
782415	2014 DD_{172}	—	February 26, 2014	Haleakala	Pan-STARRS 1	THM	1.8 km	MPC · JPL
782416	2014 DL_{172}	—	February 26, 2014	Haleakala	Pan-STARRS 1	·	2.2 km	MPC · JPL
782417	2014 DV_{172}	—	February 24, 2014	Haleakala	Pan-STARRS 1	·	1.9 km	MPC · JPL
782418	2014 DH_{173}	—	February 26, 2014	Haleakala	Pan-STARRS 1	·	2.2 km	MPC · JPL
782419	2014 DK_{173}	—	February 26, 2014	Haleakala	Pan-STARRS 1	·	1.6 km	MPC · JPL
782420	2014 DL_{174}	—	February 26, 2014	Haleakala	Pan-STARRS 1	·	2.1 km	MPC · JPL
782421	2014 DG_{175}	—	November 3, 2011	Kitt Peak	Spacewatch	EOS	1.6 km	MPC · JPL
782422	2014 DG_{176}	—	February 27, 2014	Haleakala	Pan-STARRS 1	·	2.2 km	MPC · JPL
782423	2014 DN_{176}	—	February 28, 2014	Mount Lemmon	Mount Lemmon Survey	·	1.8 km	MPC · JPL
782424	2014 DO_{176}	—	February 19, 2014	Mount Lemmon	Mount Lemmon Survey	·	1.8 km	MPC · JPL
782425	2014 DA_{177}	—	February 28, 2014	Haleakala	Pan-STARRS 1	·	1.6 km	MPC · JPL
782426	2014 DO_{178}	—	February 26, 2014	Mount Lemmon	Mount Lemmon Survey	URS	2.1 km	MPC · JPL
782427	2014 DZ_{178}	—	February 28, 2014	Haleakala	Pan-STARRS 1	·	2.2 km	MPC · JPL
782428	2014 DO_{179}	—	February 26, 2014	Haleakala	Pan-STARRS 1	·	2.0 km	MPC · JPL
782429	2014 DQ_{179}	—	February 28, 2014	Haleakala	Pan-STARRS 1	·	2.0 km	MPC · JPL
782430	2014 DU_{179}	—	February 24, 2014	Haleakala	Pan-STARRS 1	EUN	840 m	MPC · JPL
782431	2014 DE_{180}	—	February 26, 2014	Haleakala	Pan-STARRS 1	·	1.2 km	MPC · JPL
782432	2014 DO_{180}	—	February 28, 2014	Haleakala	Pan-STARRS 1	THM	1.7 km	MPC · JPL
782433	2014 DK_{184}	—	February 26, 2014	Haleakala	Pan-STARRS 1	L4	6.6 km	MPC · JPL
782434	2014 DW_{185}	—	February 22, 2014	Kitt Peak	Spacewatch	·	1.9 km	MPC · JPL
782435	2014 DA_{186}	—	February 20, 2014	Mount Lemmon	Mount Lemmon Survey	THM	1.7 km	MPC · JPL
782436	2014 DK_{186}	—	February 26, 2014	Haleakala	Pan-STARRS 1	·	2.0 km	MPC · JPL
782437	2014 DA_{187}	—	February 26, 2014	Haleakala	Pan-STARRS 1	·	2.0 km	MPC · JPL
782438	2014 DK_{187}	—	February 20, 2014	Mount Lemmon	Mount Lemmon Survey	·	870 m	MPC · JPL
782439	2014 DP_{187}	—	February 24, 2014	Haleakala	Pan-STARRS 1	VER	1.9 km	MPC · JPL
782440	2014 DY_{187}	—	February 26, 2014	Mount Lemmon	Mount Lemmon Survey	L4	6.0 km	MPC · JPL
782441	2014 DE_{188}	—	February 27, 2014	Haleakala	Pan-STARRS 1	L4	6.5 km	MPC · JPL
782442	2014 DX_{190}	—	February 22, 2014	Mount Lemmon	Mount Lemmon Survey	L4	6.8 km	MPC · JPL
782443	2014 DZ_{190}	—	February 26, 2014	Haleakala	Pan-STARRS 1	·	1.5 km	MPC · JPL
782444	2014 DB_{191}	—	February 28, 2014	Haleakala	Pan-STARRS 1	L4	5.9 km	MPC · JPL
782445	2014 DQ_{192}	—	February 28, 2014	Haleakala	Pan-STARRS 1	·	1.2 km	MPC · JPL
782446	2014 DZ_{192}	—	February 26, 2014	Haleakala	Pan-STARRS 1	·	1.2 km	MPC · JPL
782447	2014 DW_{194}	—	February 20, 2014	Mount Lemmon	Mount Lemmon Survey	·	1.3 km	MPC · JPL
782448	2014 DG_{195}	—	February 26, 2014	Haleakala	Pan-STARRS 1	·	2.0 km	MPC · JPL
782449	2014 DH_{195}	—	February 28, 2014	Haleakala	Pan-STARRS 1	NEM	1.6 km	MPC · JPL
782450	2014 DR_{196}	—	February 26, 2014	Haleakala	Pan-STARRS 1	L4	6.2 km	MPC · JPL
782451	2014 DV_{196}	—	February 24, 2014	Haleakala	Pan-STARRS 1	·	2.0 km	MPC · JPL
782452	2014 DZ_{196}	—	February 18, 2014	Mount Lemmon	Mount Lemmon Survey	·	2.3 km	MPC · JPL
782453	2014 DA_{197}	—	February 26, 2014	Haleakala	Pan-STARRS 1	·	1.9 km	MPC · JPL
782454	2014 DL_{197}	—	February 26, 2014	Mount Lemmon	Mount Lemmon Survey	L4	5.8 km	MPC · JPL
782455	2014 DN_{197}	—	February 26, 2014	Mount Lemmon	Mount Lemmon Survey	L4	5.7 km	MPC · JPL
782456	2014 DL_{200}	—	February 26, 2014	Haleakala	Pan-STARRS 1	·	1.8 km	MPC · JPL
782457	2014 DV_{200}	—	February 28, 2014	Haleakala	Pan-STARRS 1	·	2.2 km	MPC · JPL
782458	2014 DC_{201}	—	February 26, 2014	Haleakala	Pan-STARRS 1	·	1.3 km	MPC · JPL
782459	2014 EZ	—	August 13, 2010	Kitt Peak	Spacewatch	T_{j} (2.93)	2.7 km	MPC · JPL
782460	2014 EK_{3}	—	February 27, 2014	Mount Lemmon	Mount Lemmon Survey	·	1.1 km	MPC · JPL
782461	2014 EJ_{4}	—	March 3, 2014	Mount Teide	A. Knöfel	·	2.3 km	MPC · JPL
782462	2014 EM_{8}	—	February 10, 2014	Mount Lemmon	Mount Lemmon Survey	THB	1.7 km	MPC · JPL
782463	2014 ER_{8}	—	February 26, 2014	Mount Lemmon	Mount Lemmon Survey	L4 · (8060)	5.8 km	MPC · JPL
782464	2014 EM_{10}	—	February 28, 2014	Haleakala	Pan-STARRS 1	·	2.0 km	MPC · JPL
782465	2014 EC_{16}	—	February 25, 2014	Kitt Peak	Spacewatch	THM	1.5 km	MPC · JPL
782466	2014 ET_{17}	—	March 6, 2014	Kitt Peak	Spacewatch	·	2.3 km	MPC · JPL
782467	2014 ED_{19}	—	March 6, 2014	Kitt Peak	Spacewatch	·	1.5 km	MPC · JPL
782468	2014 EB_{20}	—	March 6, 2014	Kitt Peak	Spacewatch	·	1.2 km	MPC · JPL
782469	2014 EL_{21}	—	January 18, 2013	Mount Lemmon	Mount Lemmon Survey	L4	6.0 km	MPC · JPL
782470	2014 EN_{27}	—	February 28, 2014	Haleakala	Pan-STARRS 1	T_{j} (2.98)	2.4 km	MPC · JPL
782471	2014 ER_{27}	—	February 12, 2008	Mount Lemmon	Mount Lemmon Survey	ELF	2.5 km	MPC · JPL
782472	2014 EY_{28}	—	February 11, 2014	Mount Lemmon	Mount Lemmon Survey	·	2.6 km	MPC · JPL
782473	2014 EP_{29}	—	March 6, 2014	Mount Lemmon	Mount Lemmon Survey	·	2.3 km	MPC · JPL
782474	2014 EW_{29}	—	March 6, 2014	Haleakala	Pan-STARRS 1	·	2.3 km	MPC · JPL
782475	2014 ET_{31}	—	March 7, 2014	Kitt Peak	Spacewatch	THB	2.1 km	MPC · JPL
782476	2014 EX_{37}	—	September 29, 2005	Mount Lemmon	Mount Lemmon Survey	·	2.4 km	MPC · JPL
782477	2014 EF_{45}	—	March 11, 2014	Mount Lemmon	Mount Lemmon Survey	·	1.8 km	MPC · JPL
782478	2014 EG_{48}	—	March 11, 2014	Mount Lemmon	Mount Lemmon Survey	·	2.2 km	MPC · JPL
782479	2014 ED_{54}	—	January 10, 2013	Haleakala	Pan-STARRS 1	L4	5.9 km	MPC · JPL
782480	2014 EG_{55}	—	October 1, 2011	Mount Lemmon	Mount Lemmon Survey	VER	1.9 km	MPC · JPL
782481	2014 EF_{56}	—	March 21, 2002	Kitt Peak	Spacewatch	·	690 m	MPC · JPL
782482	2014 ES_{56}	—	February 3, 2013	Haleakala	Pan-STARRS 1	L4	5.1 km	MPC · JPL
782483	2014 EE_{59}	—	August 3, 2016	Haleakala	Pan-STARRS 1	·	1.6 km	MPC · JPL
782484	2014 EL_{60}	—	April 18, 2015	Cerro Tololo	DECam	L4	5.8 km	MPC · JPL
782485	2014 EN_{61}	—	May 20, 2015	Cerro Tololo	DECam	EOS	1.4 km	MPC · JPL
782486	2014 EW_{63}	—	October 17, 2012	Haleakala	Pan-STARRS 1	·	1.9 km	MPC · JPL
782487	2014 EK_{64}	—	November 9, 2017	Cerro Paranal	Altmann, M., Prusti, T.	·	1.3 km	MPC · JPL
782488	2014 EO_{64}	—	September 21, 2017	Haleakala	Pan-STARRS 1	·	1.9 km	MPC · JPL
782489	2014 EX_{67}	—	February 28, 2014	Haleakala	Pan-STARRS 1	L4	6.0 km	MPC · JPL
782490	2014 EZ_{69}	—	February 28, 2014	Haleakala	Pan-STARRS 1	·	1.9 km	MPC · JPL
782491	2014 EL_{70}	—	April 18, 2015	Mount Lemmon	Mount Lemmon Survey	L4	5.7 km	MPC · JPL
782492	2014 EV_{70}	—	August 8, 2016	Haleakala	Pan-STARRS 1	·	1.8 km	MPC · JPL
782493	2014 EX_{72}	—	April 18, 2015	Cerro Tololo	DECam	L4	5.4 km	MPC · JPL
782494	2014 EV_{75}	—	September 13, 2007	Kitt Peak	Spacewatch	·	1.3 km	MPC · JPL
782495	2014 EG_{76}	—	March 2, 2014	Cerro Tololo	High Cadence Transient Survey	EOS	1.3 km	MPC · JPL
782496	2014 ER_{77}	—	September 2, 2017	Haleakala	Pan-STARRS 1	·	2.2 km	MPC · JPL
782497	2014 EK_{78}	—	August 12, 2016	Haleakala	Pan-STARRS 1	·	1.3 km	MPC · JPL
782498	2014 EB_{80}	—	February 28, 2014	Haleakala	Pan-STARRS 1	·	1.6 km	MPC · JPL
782499	2014 EC_{80}	—	October 20, 2016	Mount Lemmon	Mount Lemmon Survey	·	1.2 km	MPC · JPL
782500	2014 EG_{84}	—	March 24, 2014	Haleakala	Pan-STARRS 1	TIR	2.1 km	MPC · JPL

== 782501–782600 ==
back to top

Designation			Discovery			Properties		Ref
Permanent	Provisional	Named after	Date	Site	Discoverer(s)	Category	Diam.	Ref
782501	2014 ES_{86}	—	March 2, 2014	Cerro Tololo	High Cadence Transient Survey	L4	6.0 km	MPC · JPL
782502	2014 EW_{87}	—	March 2, 2014	Cerro Tololo	High Cadence Transient Survey	·	1.8 km	MPC · JPL
782503	2014 EL_{91}	—	October 13, 2017	Mount Lemmon	Mount Lemmon Survey	·	2.6 km	MPC · JPL
782504	2014 EL_{96}	—	February 28, 2014	Haleakala	Pan-STARRS 1	·	2.0 km	MPC · JPL
782505	2014 EQ_{98}	—	February 26, 2014	Haleakala	Pan-STARRS 1	ELF	2.2 km	MPC · JPL
782506	2014 EV_{98}	—	August 8, 2016	Haleakala	Pan-STARRS 1	·	1.6 km	MPC · JPL
782507	2014 EU_{99}	—	February 22, 2014	Calar Alto-CASADO	Mottola, S., Hellmich, S.	L4	6.2 km	MPC · JPL
782508	2014 EC_{102}	—	February 26, 2014	Haleakala	Pan-STARRS 1	·	1.5 km	MPC · JPL
782509	2014 EE_{108}	—	September 4, 2011	Haleakala	Pan-STARRS 1	·	1.9 km	MPC · JPL
782510	2014 EX_{113}	—	September 4, 2011	Haleakala	Pan-STARRS 1	·	1.8 km	MPC · JPL
782511	2014 EU_{118}	—	October 28, 2017	Haleakala	Pan-STARRS 1	·	2.6 km	MPC · JPL
782512	2014 EW_{118}	—	February 28, 2014	Haleakala	Pan-STARRS 1	·	1.9 km	MPC · JPL
782513	2014 EF_{120}	—	February 28, 2014	Haleakala	Pan-STARRS 1	·	2.0 km	MPC · JPL
782514	2014 EK_{121}	—	March 5, 2014	Haleakala	Pan-STARRS 1	·	2.3 km	MPC · JPL
782515	2014 EG_{122}	—	April 19, 2015	Cerro Tololo	DECam	L4	5.9 km	MPC · JPL
782516	2014 ER_{128}	—	May 1, 2016	Cerro Tololo	DECam	L4	5.5 km	MPC · JPL
782517	2014 EX_{128}	—	February 26, 2014	Haleakala	Pan-STARRS 1	·	2.4 km	MPC · JPL
782518	2014 ER_{130}	—	March 3, 2014	Cerro Tololo	High Cadence Transient Survey	·	1.9 km	MPC · JPL
782519	2014 EJ_{131}	—	June 8, 2016	Haleakala	Pan-STARRS 1	·	2.1 km	MPC · JPL
782520	2014 EX_{134}	—	February 28, 2014	Haleakala	Pan-STARRS 1	L4	5.4 km	MPC · JPL
782521	2014 EW_{137}	—	December 12, 2012	Mount Lemmon	Mount Lemmon Survey	·	2.4 km	MPC · JPL
782522	2014 EC_{143}	—	January 20, 2013	Mount Lemmon	Mount Lemmon Survey	L4	5.6 km	MPC · JPL
782523	2014 EQ_{146}	—	February 28, 2014	Haleakala	Pan-STARRS 1	·	1.7 km	MPC · JPL
782524	2014 EP_{147}	—	April 18, 2015	Cerro Tololo	DECam	L4	5.4 km	MPC · JPL
782525	2014 EL_{151}	—	November 8, 2010	Kitt Peak	Spacewatch	L4	6.7 km	MPC · JPL
782526	2014 EL_{154}	—	May 14, 2015	Haleakala	Pan-STARRS 1	·	1.9 km	MPC · JPL
782527	2014 EW_{155}	—	September 29, 2011	Mount Lemmon	Mount Lemmon Survey	·	2.4 km	MPC · JPL
782528	2014 EN_{157}	—	February 28, 2014	Haleakala	Pan-STARRS 1	·	1.5 km	MPC · JPL
782529	2014 EE_{159}	—	September 23, 2008	Kitt Peak	Spacewatch	L4	6.1 km	MPC · JPL
782530	2014 EO_{159}	—	March 4, 2014	Cerro Tololo	High Cadence Transient Survey	L4	5.4 km	MPC · JPL
782531	2014 EW_{160}	—	September 21, 2017	Haleakala	Pan-STARRS 1	·	2.0 km	MPC · JPL
782532	2014 EK_{161}	—	May 27, 2015	Mount Lemmon	Mount Lemmon Survey	·	2.1 km	MPC · JPL
782533	2014 EK_{162}	—	December 9, 2016	Mount Lemmon	Mount Lemmon Survey	·	1.2 km	MPC · JPL
782534	2014 EL_{165}	—	March 4, 2014	Cerro Tololo	High Cadence Transient Survey	L4	6.0 km	MPC · JPL
782535	2014 EJ_{169}	—	April 21, 2015	Cerro Tololo	DECam	L4	5.2 km	MPC · JPL
782536	2014 EM_{169}	—	April 18, 2015	Cerro Tololo	DECam	L4	5.4 km	MPC · JPL
782537	2014 EG_{173}	—	April 23, 2015	Haleakala	Pan-STARRS 1	·	1.9 km	MPC · JPL
782538	2014 EO_{173}	—	May 20, 2015	Cerro Tololo	DECam	·	1.8 km	MPC · JPL
782539	2014 EC_{177}	—	September 11, 2016	Mount Lemmon	Mount Lemmon Survey	·	1.3 km	MPC · JPL
782540	2014 EW_{177}	—	October 22, 2012	Haleakala	Pan-STARRS 1	·	1.3 km	MPC · JPL
782541	2014 EE_{180}	—	March 4, 2014	Cerro Tololo	High Cadence Transient Survey	L4	6.3 km	MPC · JPL
782542	2014 EL_{187}	—	January 10, 2013	Haleakala	Pan-STARRS 1	L4 · ERY	5.9 km	MPC · JPL
782543	2014 EY_{187}	—	September 28, 2008	Mount Lemmon	Mount Lemmon Survey	L4	6.2 km	MPC · JPL
782544	2014 ET_{188}	—	May 10, 2015	Mount Lemmon	Mount Lemmon Survey	·	2.3 km	MPC · JPL
782545	2014 EB_{193}	—	April 18, 2015	Cerro Tololo	DECam	L4	5.1 km	MPC · JPL
782546	2014 EB_{196}	—	April 23, 2015	Haleakala	Pan-STARRS 1	·	2.3 km	MPC · JPL
782547	2014 EU_{198}	—	November 12, 2012	Mount Lemmon	Mount Lemmon Survey	·	1.8 km	MPC · JPL
782548	2014 EG_{202}	—	April 18, 2015	Cerro Tololo	DECam	L4	5.5 km	MPC · JPL
782549	2014 EY_{203}	—	May 19, 2015	Cerro Tololo	DECam	·	1.9 km	MPC · JPL
782550	2014 EK_{206}	—	December 8, 2012	Mount Lemmon	Mount Lemmon Survey	VER	2.0 km	MPC · JPL
782551	2014 EJ_{207}	—	April 18, 2015	Cerro Tololo	DECam	L4	5.4 km	MPC · JPL
782552	2014 EV_{207}	—	April 23, 2015	Haleakala	Pan-STARRS 1	EOS	1.3 km	MPC · JPL
782553	2014 EX_{213}	—	March 5, 2014	Haleakala	Pan-STARRS 1	·	1.7 km	MPC · JPL
782554	2014 EA_{216}	—	May 21, 2015	Cerro Tololo	DECam	·	2.4 km	MPC · JPL
782555	2014 EU_{216}	—	March 5, 2014	Cerro Tololo	High Cadence Transient Survey	L4	5.6 km	MPC · JPL
782556	2014 EW_{216}	—	March 5, 2014	Cerro Tololo	High Cadence Transient Survey	MAR	850 m	MPC · JPL
782557	2014 EP_{217}	—	March 5, 2014	Cerro Tololo	High Cadence Transient Survey	·	1.7 km	MPC · JPL
782558	2014 EU_{217}	—	March 5, 2014	Cerro Tololo	High Cadence Transient Survey	·	2.3 km	MPC · JPL
782559	2014 EV_{218}	—	August 31, 2005	Kitt Peak	Spacewatch	·	2.2 km	MPC · JPL
782560	2014 EE_{220}	—	April 19, 2015	Cerro Tololo	DECam	L4	5.0 km	MPC · JPL
782561	2014 EK_{220}	—	September 24, 2011	Haleakala	Pan-STARRS 1	·	1.8 km	MPC · JPL
782562	2014 EO_{222}	—	August 16, 2017	Haleakala	Pan-STARRS 1	·	2.0 km	MPC · JPL
782563	2014 EW_{223}	—	November 12, 2010	Mount Lemmon	Mount Lemmon Survey	L4	6.4 km	MPC · JPL
782564	2014 EB_{226}	—	March 5, 2014	Cerro Tololo	High Cadence Transient Survey	EOS	1.4 km	MPC · JPL
782565	2014 EE_{226}	—	September 24, 2011	Haleakala	Pan-STARRS 1	URS	2.0 km	MPC · JPL
782566	2014 ES_{228}	—	April 18, 2015	Cerro Tololo	DECam	·	2.6 km	MPC · JPL
782567	2014 ES_{234}	—	October 22, 2012	Haleakala	Pan-STARRS 1	(5)	920 m	MPC · JPL
782568	2014 ER_{235}	—	January 10, 2008	Kitt Peak	Spacewatch	·	2.1 km	MPC · JPL
782569	2014 EW_{244}	—	October 25, 2016	Haleakala	Pan-STARRS 1	·	810 m	MPC · JPL
782570	2014 EJ_{246}	—	August 13, 2010	Kitt Peak	Spacewatch	·	2.2 km	MPC · JPL
782571	2014 EY_{248}	—	January 11, 2008	Kitt Peak	Spacewatch	·	1.9 km	MPC · JPL
782572	2014 ED_{251}	—	March 13, 2014	Mount Lemmon	Mount Lemmon Survey	·	2.2 km	MPC · JPL
782573	2014 EQ_{252}	—	March 12, 2014	Mount Lemmon	Mount Lemmon Survey	·	1.2 km	MPC · JPL
782574	2014 EC_{253}	—	March 10, 2014	Mount Lemmon	Mount Lemmon Survey	·	2.1 km	MPC · JPL
782575	2014 EN_{253}	—	March 6, 2014	Mount Lemmon	Mount Lemmon Survey	·	2.4 km	MPC · JPL
782576	2014 EY_{253}	—	March 6, 2014	Mount Teide	A. Knöfel	·	1.5 km	MPC · JPL
782577	2014 EA_{254}	—	March 10, 2014	Mount Lemmon	Mount Lemmon Survey	·	850 m	MPC · JPL
782578	2014 EO_{254}	—	March 10, 2014	Mount Lemmon	Mount Lemmon Survey	·	2.2 km	MPC · JPL
782579	2014 EU_{254}	—	March 13, 2014	Mount Lemmon	Mount Lemmon Survey	·	2.2 km	MPC · JPL
782580	2014 EV_{254}	—	March 12, 2014	Mount Lemmon	Mount Lemmon Survey	·	2.3 km	MPC · JPL
782581	2014 EX_{254}	—	March 13, 2014	Mount Lemmon	Mount Lemmon Survey	THB	2.0 km	MPC · JPL
782582	2014 EL_{255}	—	March 6, 2014	Kitt Peak	Spacewatch	·	1.4 km	MPC · JPL
782583	2014 ET_{255}	—	March 11, 2014	Mount Lemmon	Mount Lemmon Survey	·	2.0 km	MPC · JPL
782584	2014 EH_{256}	—	March 6, 2014	Mount Lemmon	Mount Lemmon Survey	·	1.5 km	MPC · JPL
782585	2014 EL_{257}	—	March 6, 2014	Kitt Peak	Spacewatch	·	1.5 km	MPC · JPL
782586	2014 EQ_{257}	—	March 10, 2014	Mount Lemmon	Mount Lemmon Survey	MAR	1.1 km	MPC · JPL
782587	2014 EA_{258}	—	March 11, 2014	Mount Lemmon	Mount Lemmon Survey	KON	1.7 km	MPC · JPL
782588	2014 EX_{258}	—	March 8, 2014	Mount Lemmon	Mount Lemmon Survey	·	2.2 km	MPC · JPL
782589	2014 FL_{2}	—	November 7, 2012	Mount Lemmon	Mount Lemmon Survey	·	1.9 km	MPC · JPL
782590	2014 FQ_{2}	—	February 26, 2014	Haleakala	Pan-STARRS 1	·	2.7 km	MPC · JPL
782591	2014 FC_{3}	—	March 20, 2014	Mount Lemmon	Mount Lemmon Survey	VER	1.9 km	MPC · JPL
782592	2014 FZ_{4}	—	March 11, 2014	Mount Lemmon	Mount Lemmon Survey	·	1.1 km	MPC · JPL
782593	2014 FA_{9}	—	April 3, 2003	Cerro Tololo	Deep Lens Survey	·	1.7 km	MPC · JPL
782594	2014 FG_{12}	—	March 2, 2009	Mount Lemmon	Mount Lemmon Survey	·	2.2 km	MPC · JPL
782595	2014 FQ_{13}	—	March 20, 2014	Mount Lemmon	Mount Lemmon Survey	MAR	840 m	MPC · JPL
782596	2014 FZ_{14}	—	March 12, 2014	Mount Lemmon	Mount Lemmon Survey	·	2.3 km	MPC · JPL
782597	2014 FA_{16}	—	February 26, 2014	Haleakala	Pan-STARRS 1	·	990 m	MPC · JPL
782598	2014 FC_{17}	—	February 9, 2014	Mount Lemmon	Mount Lemmon Survey	·	1.4 km	MPC · JPL
782599	2014 FR_{20}	—	March 9, 2014	Haleakala	Pan-STARRS 1	T_{j} (2.95)	2.7 km	MPC · JPL
782600	2014 FH_{23}	—	February 28, 2014	Haleakala	Pan-STARRS 1	·	1.9 km	MPC · JPL

== 782601–782700 ==
back to top

Designation			Discovery			Properties		Ref
Permanent	Provisional	Named after	Date	Site	Discoverer(s)	Category	Diam.	Ref
782601	2014 FQ_{27}	—	February 28, 2014	Haleakala	Pan-STARRS 1	·	1.8 km	MPC · JPL
782602	2014 FX_{38}	—	March 20, 2014	Mount Lemmon	Mount Lemmon Survey	·	2.1 km	MPC · JPL
782603	2014 FE_{40}	—	February 26, 2014	Mount Lemmon	Mount Lemmon Survey	·	2.8 km	MPC · JPL
782604	2014 FT_{42}	—	March 28, 2014	Mount Lemmon	Mount Lemmon Survey	·	2.4 km	MPC · JPL
782605	2014 FP_{45}	—	March 11, 2014	Mount Lemmon	Mount Lemmon Survey	·	2.1 km	MPC · JPL
782606	2014 FE_{46}	—	March 11, 2014	Mount Lemmon	Mount Lemmon Survey	·	1.2 km	MPC · JPL
782607	2014 FC_{47}	—	April 26, 2003	Kitt Peak	Spacewatch	·	2.1 km	MPC · JPL
782608	2014 FD_{49}	—	February 27, 2014	Haleakala	Pan-STARRS 1	T_{j} (2.92)	3.5 km	MPC · JPL
782609 Becheș	2014 FM_{51}	Becheș	March 27, 2014	La Palma	EURONEAR	·	2.2 km	MPC · JPL
782610	2014 FL_{53}	—	March 28, 2014	Mount Lemmon	Mount Lemmon Survey	·	1.5 km	MPC · JPL
782611	2014 FO_{62}	—	March 26, 2014	Mount Lemmon	Mount Lemmon Survey	·	2.2 km	MPC · JPL
782612	2014 FG_{68}	—	March 22, 2014	Kitt Peak	Spacewatch	THB	2.6 km	MPC · JPL
782613	2014 FW_{75}	—	March 27, 2014	Haleakala	Pan-STARRS 1	·	2.0 km	MPC · JPL
782614	2014 FA_{77}	—	March 24, 2014	Haleakala	Pan-STARRS 1	·	2.4 km	MPC · JPL
782615	2014 FM_{78}	—	March 28, 2014	Mount Lemmon	Mount Lemmon Survey	·	860 m	MPC · JPL
782616	2014 FO_{79}	—	June 18, 2015	Haleakala	Pan-STARRS 1	·	880 m	MPC · JPL
782617	2014 FN_{81}	—	August 2, 2016	Haleakala	Pan-STARRS 1	·	1.9 km	MPC · JPL
782618	2014 FN_{82}	—	March 25, 2014	Mount Lemmon	Mount Lemmon Survey	·	2.5 km	MPC · JPL
782619	2014 FR_{82}	—	March 29, 2014	Mount Lemmon	Mount Lemmon Survey	·	2.5 km	MPC · JPL
782620	2014 FF_{83}	—	March 22, 2014	Mount Lemmon	Mount Lemmon Survey	·	2.4 km	MPC · JPL
782621	2014 FG_{83}	—	March 24, 2014	Haleakala	Pan-STARRS 1	·	2.1 km	MPC · JPL
782622	2014 FO_{83}	—	March 24, 2014	Haleakala	Pan-STARRS 1	·	2.3 km	MPC · JPL
782623	2014 FD_{84}	—	March 28, 2014	Mount Lemmon	Mount Lemmon Survey	AGN	890 m	MPC · JPL
782624	2014 FL_{84}	—	March 24, 2014	Haleakala	Pan-STARRS 1	·	2.3 km	MPC · JPL
782625	2014 FN_{84}	—	March 26, 2014	Mount Lemmon	Mount Lemmon Survey	T_{j} (2.96)	2.7 km	MPC · JPL
782626	2014 FQ_{84}	—	March 29, 2014	Mount Lemmon	Mount Lemmon Survey	·	2.2 km	MPC · JPL
782627	2014 FJ_{85}	—	March 28, 2014	Mount Lemmon	Mount Lemmon Survey	·	1.9 km	MPC · JPL
782628	2014 FF_{87}	—	March 28, 2014	Mount Lemmon	Mount Lemmon Survey	·	1.4 km	MPC · JPL
782629	2014 FQ_{87}	—	March 23, 2014	Mount Lemmon	Mount Lemmon Survey	·	2.6 km	MPC · JPL
782630	2014 FY_{87}	—	March 29, 2014	Mount Lemmon	Mount Lemmon Survey	·	2.0 km	MPC · JPL
782631	2014 FA_{88}	—	March 26, 2014	Mount Lemmon	Mount Lemmon Survey	·	1.9 km	MPC · JPL
782632	2014 FR_{88}	—	March 28, 2014	Mount Lemmon	Mount Lemmon Survey	L4	6.4 km	MPC · JPL
782633	2014 FY_{88}	—	March 31, 2014	Mount Lemmon	Mount Lemmon Survey	·	970 m	MPC · JPL
782634	2014 FT_{89}	—	March 25, 2014	Mount Lemmon	Mount Lemmon Survey	·	1.2 km	MPC · JPL
782635	2014 FF_{90}	—	March 20, 2014	Mount Lemmon	Mount Lemmon Survey	·	2.5 km	MPC · JPL
782636	2014 FA_{91}	—	March 22, 2014	Mount Lemmon	Mount Lemmon Survey	·	1.9 km	MPC · JPL
782637	2014 FA_{92}	—	March 24, 2014	Haleakala	Pan-STARRS 1	·	1.4 km	MPC · JPL
782638	2014 FC_{92}	—	March 29, 2014	Mount Lemmon	Mount Lemmon Survey	·	2.2 km	MPC · JPL
782639	2014 FT_{96}	—	March 31, 2014	Mount Lemmon	Mount Lemmon Survey	·	1.2 km	MPC · JPL
782640	2014 GV	—	April 1, 2014	Mount Lemmon	Mount Lemmon Survey	·	740 m	MPC · JPL
782641	2014 GZ_{3}	—	November 19, 2008	Kitt Peak	Spacewatch	·	760 m	MPC · JPL
782642	2014 GC_{6}	—	March 18, 2010	Kitt Peak	Spacewatch	·	700 m	MPC · JPL
782643	2014 GC_{7}	—	April 1, 2014	Mount Lemmon	Mount Lemmon Survey	·	970 m	MPC · JPL
782644	2014 GZ_{18}	—	October 11, 2007	Mount Lemmon	Mount Lemmon Survey	·	1.3 km	MPC · JPL
782645	2014 GE_{27}	—	April 4, 2014	Mount Lemmon	Mount Lemmon Survey	·	1.8 km	MPC · JPL
782646	2014 GV_{39}	—	February 28, 2008	Kitt Peak	Spacewatch	·	2.0 km	MPC · JPL
782647	2014 GO_{43}	—	April 6, 2014	Mount Lemmon	Mount Lemmon Survey	·	2.1 km	MPC · JPL
782648	2014 GV_{43}	—	April 5, 2014	Mount Lemmon	Mount Lemmon Survey	URS	2.3 km	MPC · JPL
782649	2014 GQ_{46}	—	October 29, 1994	Kitt Peak	Spacewatch	HNS	1 km	MPC · JPL
782650	2014 GA_{58}	—	March 12, 2008	Mount Lemmon	Mount Lemmon Survey	·	2.3 km	MPC · JPL
782651	2014 GL_{58}	—	April 4, 2014	Haleakala	Pan-STARRS 1	·	1.8 km	MPC · JPL
782652	2014 GN_{58}	—	April 4, 2014	Haleakala	Pan-STARRS 1	·	1.6 km	MPC · JPL
782653	2014 GA_{59}	—	April 9, 2014	Kitt Peak	Spacewatch	·	1.3 km	MPC · JPL
782654	2014 GE_{60}	—	April 4, 2014	Kitt Peak	Spacewatch	VER	2.1 km	MPC · JPL
782655	2014 GE_{61}	—	April 5, 2014	Haleakala	Pan-STARRS 1	·	1.5 km	MPC · JPL
782656	2014 GR_{61}	—	April 5, 2014	Haleakala	Pan-STARRS 1	·	1.1 km	MPC · JPL
782657	2014 GN_{62}	—	April 5, 2014	Haleakala	Pan-STARRS 1	·	2.3 km	MPC · JPL
782658	2014 GP_{62}	—	April 5, 2014	Haleakala	Pan-STARRS 1	·	900 m	MPC · JPL
782659	2014 GO_{65}	—	April 3, 2014	Haleakala	Pan-STARRS 1	·	980 m	MPC · JPL
782660	2014 GF_{66}	—	April 4, 2015	Haleakala	Pan-STARRS 1	TIR	2.3 km	MPC · JPL
782661	2014 GL_{66}	—	April 5, 2014	Haleakala	Pan-STARRS 1	·	2.5 km	MPC · JPL
782662	2014 GP_{69}	—	March 11, 2008	Mount Lemmon	Mount Lemmon Survey	·	2.2 km	MPC · JPL
782663	2014 GD_{70}	—	April 8, 2014	Haleakala	Pan-STARRS 1	EUP	2.1 km	MPC · JPL
782664	2014 GE_{70}	—	April 5, 2014	Haleakala	Pan-STARRS 1	THB	2.0 km	MPC · JPL
782665	2014 GO_{70}	—	April 5, 2014	Haleakala	Pan-STARRS 1	·	920 m	MPC · JPL
782666	2014 GS_{70}	—	April 8, 2014	Mount Lemmon	Mount Lemmon Survey	·	2.2 km	MPC · JPL
782667	2014 GW_{70}	—	April 5, 2014	Haleakala	Pan-STARRS 1	·	1.3 km	MPC · JPL
782668	2014 GC_{71}	—	April 6, 2014	Mount Lemmon	Mount Lemmon Survey	·	1.8 km	MPC · JPL
782669	2014 GF_{74}	—	April 8, 2014	Kitt Peak	Spacewatch	·	1.1 km	MPC · JPL
782670	2014 GS_{75}	—	April 5, 2014	Haleakala	Pan-STARRS 1	·	2.3 km	MPC · JPL
782671	2014 GL_{76}	—	April 5, 2014	Haleakala	Pan-STARRS 1	·	2.5 km	MPC · JPL
782672	2014 GR_{76}	—	April 4, 2014	Haleakala	Pan-STARRS 1	·	2.4 km	MPC · JPL
782673	2014 GW_{76}	—	April 7, 2014	Mount Lemmon	Mount Lemmon Survey	·	2.2 km	MPC · JPL
782674	2014 GY_{76}	—	April 7, 2014	Mount Lemmon	Mount Lemmon Survey	·	1.9 km	MPC · JPL
782675	2014 GK_{77}	—	April 7, 2014	Mount Lemmon	Mount Lemmon Survey	VER	2.1 km	MPC · JPL
782676	2014 GM_{77}	—	April 1, 2014	Mount Lemmon	Mount Lemmon Survey	·	1.8 km	MPC · JPL
782677	2014 GC_{78}	—	April 8, 2014	Mount Lemmon	Mount Lemmon Survey	·	2.2 km	MPC · JPL
782678	2014 GO_{78}	—	April 8, 2014	Haleakala	Pan-STARRS 1	·	2.3 km	MPC · JPL
782679	2014 GG_{79}	—	April 1, 2014	Mount Lemmon	Mount Lemmon Survey	·	2.2 km	MPC · JPL
782680	2014 GJ_{80}	—	April 5, 2014	Haleakala	Pan-STARRS 1	HNS	720 m	MPC · JPL
782681	2014 GM_{80}	—	April 4, 2014	Haleakala	Pan-STARRS 1	·	730 m	MPC · JPL
782682	2014 GQ_{81}	—	April 1, 2014	Mount Lemmon	Mount Lemmon Survey	·	1.9 km	MPC · JPL
782683	2014 GU_{81}	—	April 8, 2014	Haleakala	Pan-STARRS 1	·	830 m	MPC · JPL
782684	2014 GU_{82}	—	April 4, 2014	Mount Lemmon	Mount Lemmon Survey	·	800 m	MPC · JPL
782685	2014 GQ_{83}	—	April 5, 2014	Haleakala	Pan-STARRS 1	·	1.3 km	MPC · JPL
782686	2014 GF_{84}	—	April 5, 2014	Haleakala	Pan-STARRS 1	·	720 m	MPC · JPL
782687	2014 GO_{86}	—	April 5, 2014	Haleakala	Pan-STARRS 1	·	1.0 km	MPC · JPL
782688	2014 GO_{87}	—	April 10, 2014	Haleakala	Pan-STARRS 1	·	2.7 km	MPC · JPL
782689	2014 GZ_{87}	—	April 4, 2014	Haleakala	Pan-STARRS 1	·	2.7 km	MPC · JPL
782690	2014 GD_{92}	—	March 6, 2008	Mount Lemmon	Mount Lemmon Survey	·	2.4 km	MPC · JPL
782691	2014 GK_{92}	—	April 5, 2014	Haleakala	Pan-STARRS 1	THM	1.8 km	MPC · JPL
782692	2014 GC_{96}	—	April 5, 2014	Haleakala	Pan-STARRS 1	·	1.6 km	MPC · JPL
782693	2014 GX_{97}	—	April 5, 2014	Haleakala	Pan-STARRS 1	·	3.1 km	MPC · JPL
782694	2014 GO_{98}	—	April 5, 2014	Haleakala	Pan-STARRS 1	·	2.3 km	MPC · JPL
782695	2014 GP_{98}	—	April 1, 2014	Mount Lemmon	Mount Lemmon Survey	·	2.0 km	MPC · JPL
782696	2014 GE_{100}	—	April 5, 2014	Haleakala	Pan-STARRS 1	EOS	1.5 km	MPC · JPL
782697	2014 GR_{100}	—	April 2, 2014	Mount Lemmon	Mount Lemmon Survey	·	1.5 km	MPC · JPL
782698	2014 GV_{101}	—	April 9, 2014	Mount Lemmon	Mount Lemmon Survey	·	2.6 km	MPC · JPL
782699	2014 HZ_{6}	—	April 20, 2014	Mount Lemmon	Mount Lemmon Survey	·	1.4 km	MPC · JPL
782700	2014 HM_{15}	—	October 18, 2011	Mount Lemmon	Mount Lemmon Survey	·	1.4 km	MPC · JPL

== 782701–782800 ==
back to top

Designation			Discovery			Properties		Ref
Permanent	Provisional	Named after	Date	Site	Discoverer(s)	Category	Diam.	Ref
782701	2014 HC_{17}	—	April 4, 2014	Haleakala	Pan-STARRS 1	·	890 m	MPC · JPL
782702	2014 HX_{19}	—	April 21, 2014	Mount Lemmon	Mount Lemmon Survey	EOS	1.4 km	MPC · JPL
782703	2014 HX_{26}	—	April 23, 2014	Cerro Tololo-DECam	DECam	·	950 m	MPC · JPL
782704	2014 HL_{28}	—	April 4, 2014	Haleakala	Pan-STARRS 1	·	1.1 km	MPC · JPL
782705	2014 HV_{30}	—	April 24, 2014	Mount Lemmon	Mount Lemmon Survey	·	2.0 km	MPC · JPL
782706	2014 HD_{31}	—	April 24, 2014	Mount Lemmon	Mount Lemmon Survey	THB	2.4 km	MPC · JPL
782707	2014 HE_{33}	—	April 24, 2014	Mount Lemmon	Mount Lemmon Survey	·	1.1 km	MPC · JPL
782708	2014 HS_{39}	—	April 3, 2008	Mount Lemmon	Mount Lemmon Survey	·	1.9 km	MPC · JPL
782709	2014 HJ_{48}	—	April 23, 2014	Cerro Tololo-DECam	DECam	·	2.1 km	MPC · JPL
782710	2014 HT_{48}	—	April 23, 2014	Cerro Tololo-DECam	DECam	·	2.6 km	MPC · JPL
782711	2014 HB_{50}	—	October 20, 2003	Kitt Peak	Spacewatch	·	1.2 km	MPC · JPL
782712	2014 HX_{50}	—	December 23, 2012	Haleakala	Pan-STARRS 1	·	1.2 km	MPC · JPL
782713	2014 HC_{51}	—	April 23, 2014	Cerro Tololo-DECam	DECam	·	860 m	MPC · JPL
782714	2014 HR_{52}	—	April 23, 2014	Cerro Tololo-DECam	DECam	·	1.3 km	MPC · JPL
782715	2014 HD_{56}	—	November 1, 2011	Kitt Peak	Spacewatch	·	2.3 km	MPC · JPL
782716	2014 HB_{58}	—	April 23, 2014	Cerro Tololo-DECam	DECam	VER	1.9 km	MPC · JPL
782717	2014 HH_{58}	—	April 23, 2014	Cerro Tololo-DECam	DECam	·	1.7 km	MPC · JPL
782718	2014 HR_{60}	—	September 2, 2010	Mount Lemmon	Mount Lemmon Survey	·	2.1 km	MPC · JPL
782719	2014 HE_{61}	—	March 29, 2014	Kitt Peak	Spacewatch	·	1.9 km	MPC · JPL
782720	2014 HG_{61}	—	January 17, 2013	Haleakala	Pan-STARRS 1	·	1.1 km	MPC · JPL
782721	2014 HT_{62}	—	September 26, 2016	Haleakala	Pan-STARRS 1	·	2.0 km	MPC · JPL
782722	2014 HP_{67}	—	September 23, 2011	Haleakala	Pan-STARRS 1	·	1.0 km	MPC · JPL
782723	2014 HT_{67}	—	October 21, 2016	Mount Lemmon	Mount Lemmon Survey	AGN	900 m	MPC · JPL
782724	2014 HQ_{71}	—	January 13, 2008	Kitt Peak	Spacewatch	KOR	950 m	MPC · JPL
782725	2014 HD_{75}	—	June 26, 2015	Haleakala	Pan-STARRS 1	KOR	900 m	MPC · JPL
782726	2014 HW_{93}	—	April 24, 2014	Mount Lemmon	Mount Lemmon Survey	·	1.5 km	MPC · JPL
782727	2014 HC_{94}	—	April 23, 2014	Cerro Tololo-DECam	DECam	·	2.0 km	MPC · JPL
782728	2014 HK_{101}	—	April 5, 2014	Haleakala	Pan-STARRS 1	·	940 m	MPC · JPL
782729	2014 HU_{106}	—	April 23, 2014	Cerro Tololo-DECam	DECam	·	1.2 km	MPC · JPL
782730	2014 HV_{110}	—	February 28, 2008	Mount Lemmon	Mount Lemmon Survey	·	1.9 km	MPC · JPL
782731	2014 HS_{111}	—	September 11, 2010	Mount Lemmon	Mount Lemmon Survey	·	2.0 km	MPC · JPL
782732	2014 HR_{112}	—	April 24, 2014	Mount Lemmon	Mount Lemmon Survey	·	1.9 km	MPC · JPL
782733	2014 HW_{116}	—	April 23, 2014	Cerro Tololo-DECam	DECam	·	1.1 km	MPC · JPL
782734	2014 HC_{118}	—	April 24, 2014	Mount Lemmon	Mount Lemmon Survey	·	1.1 km	MPC · JPL
782735	2014 HZ_{119}	—	August 30, 2016	Haleakala	Pan-STARRS 1	·	2.8 km	MPC · JPL
782736	2014 HO_{120}	—	April 24, 2014	Mount Lemmon	Mount Lemmon Survey	·	800 m	MPC · JPL
782737	2014 HD_{122}	—	April 25, 2014	Mount Lemmon	Mount Lemmon Survey	·	1.8 km	MPC · JPL
782738	2014 HQ_{125}	—	March 9, 2008	Kitt Peak	Spacewatch	·	2.1 km	MPC · JPL
782739	2014 HT_{136}	—	April 23, 2014	Cerro Tololo-DECam	DECam	AST	1.3 km	MPC · JPL
782740	2014 HD_{137}	—	April 23, 2014	Cerro Tololo-DECam	DECam	·	2.6 km	MPC · JPL
782741	2014 HO_{139}	—	April 23, 2014	Cerro Tololo-DECam	DECam	·	1.0 km	MPC · JPL
782742	2014 HG_{151}	—	March 24, 2014	Haleakala	Pan-STARRS 1	·	1.3 km	MPC · JPL
782743	2014 HR_{151}	—	March 24, 2014	Haleakala	Pan-STARRS 1	·	970 m	MPC · JPL
782744	2014 HT_{153}	—	April 23, 2014	Cerro Tololo-DECam	DECam	MAR	690 m	MPC · JPL
782745	2014 HT_{154}	—	April 23, 2014	Haleakala	Pan-STARRS 1	·	2.2 km	MPC · JPL
782746	2014 HR_{155}	—	March 11, 2008	Mount Lemmon	Mount Lemmon Survey	·	2.7 km	MPC · JPL
782747	2014 HW_{160}	—	March 28, 2014	Mount Lemmon	Mount Lemmon Survey	EUN	850 m	MPC · JPL
782748	2014 HP_{163}	—	February 26, 2014	Kitt Peak	Spacewatch	·	2.5 km	MPC · JPL
782749	2014 HS_{164}	—	April 29, 2014	Mount Lemmon	Mount Lemmon Survey	·	2.4 km	MPC · JPL
782750	2014 HS_{168}	—	February 28, 2014	Haleakala	Pan-STARRS 1	·	2.7 km	MPC · JPL
782751	2014 HT_{170}	—	April 5, 2014	Haleakala	Pan-STARRS 1	·	890 m	MPC · JPL
782752	2014 HS_{174}	—	April 5, 2014	Haleakala	Pan-STARRS 1	·	820 m	MPC · JPL
782753	2014 HC_{175}	—	April 29, 2014	Haleakala	Pan-STARRS 1	·	1.8 km	MPC · JPL
782754	2014 HR_{180}	—	March 26, 2008	Mount Lemmon	Mount Lemmon Survey	·	1.9 km	MPC · JPL
782755	2014 HJ_{181}	—	February 28, 2014	Haleakala	Pan-STARRS 1	·	850 m	MPC · JPL
782756	2014 HN_{181}	—	May 14, 2010	Mount Lemmon	Mount Lemmon Survey	·	1.2 km	MPC · JPL
782757	2014 HH_{187}	—	April 30, 2014	Haleakala	Pan-STARRS 1	·	1.4 km	MPC · JPL
782758	2014 HY_{189}	—	April 30, 2014	Haleakala	Pan-STARRS 1	·	860 m	MPC · JPL
782759	2014 HO_{191}	—	April 30, 2014	Haleakala	Pan-STARRS 1	3:2 · SHU	4.0 km	MPC · JPL
782760	2014 HX_{202}	—	February 5, 2013	Mount Lemmon	Mount Lemmon Survey	·	1.7 km	MPC · JPL
782761	2014 HD_{205}	—	April 24, 2014	Haleakala	Pan-STARRS 1	BRG	990 m	MPC · JPL
782762	2014 HV_{205}	—	April 28, 2014	Haleakala	Pan-STARRS 1	MAR	660 m	MPC · JPL
782763	2014 HW_{205}	—	April 28, 2014	Haleakala	Pan-STARRS 1	BRG	1.0 km	MPC · JPL
782764	2014 HQ_{206}	—	April 30, 2014	Haleakala	Pan-STARRS 1	·	1.3 km	MPC · JPL
782765	2014 HJ_{207}	—	April 30, 2014	Haleakala	Pan-STARRS 1	KON	1.8 km	MPC · JPL
782766	2014 HP_{216}	—	February 18, 2008	Mount Lemmon	Mount Lemmon Survey	·	2.2 km	MPC · JPL
782767	2014 HC_{222}	—	April 29, 2014	Haleakala	Pan-STARRS 1	·	2.0 km	MPC · JPL
782768	2014 HJ_{222}	—	April 23, 2014	Haleakala	Pan-STARRS 1	TIR	1.8 km	MPC · JPL
782769	2014 HM_{222}	—	April 21, 2014	Mount Lemmon	Mount Lemmon Survey	·	2.1 km	MPC · JPL
782770	2014 HX_{222}	—	April 25, 2014	Mount Lemmon	Mount Lemmon Survey	·	2.2 km	MPC · JPL
782771	2014 HP_{223}	—	April 30, 2014	Haleakala	Pan-STARRS 1	VER	1.9 km	MPC · JPL
782772	2014 HY_{224}	—	April 23, 2014	Haleakala	Pan-STARRS 1	·	2.2 km	MPC · JPL
782773	2014 HZ_{226}	—	April 30, 2014	Mount Lemmon	Mount Lemmon Survey	·	1.3 km	MPC · JPL
782774	2014 HC_{227}	—	April 23, 2014	Cerro Tololo	DECam	·	920 m	MPC · JPL
782775	2014 HC_{229}	—	April 29, 2014	Haleakala	Pan-STARRS 1	·	1.3 km	MPC · JPL
782776	2014 HP_{231}	—	April 24, 2014	Mount Lemmon	Mount Lemmon Survey	·	1 km	MPC · JPL
782777	2014 HO_{232}	—	April 29, 2014	Haleakala	Pan-STARRS 1	·	2.1 km	MPC · JPL
782778	2014 HK_{234}	—	August 29, 2011	Mauna Kea	D. J. Tholen, M. Micheli	EOS	1.5 km	MPC · JPL
782779	2014 HR_{236}	—	April 29, 2014	Haleakala	Pan-STARRS 1	·	1.3 km	MPC · JPL
782780	2014 HT_{243}	—	April 29, 2014	Haleakala	Pan-STARRS 1	·	960 m	MPC · JPL
782781	2014 HB_{245}	—	April 28, 2014	Cerro Tololo	DECam	·	1.3 km	MPC · JPL
782782	2014 HQ_{245}	—	January 25, 2009	Kitt Peak	Spacewatch	·	1.1 km	MPC · JPL
782783	2014 HZ_{245}	—	March 8, 2008	Kitt Peak	Spacewatch	THB	2.0 km	MPC · JPL
782784	2014 HF_{256}	—	April 28, 2014	Cerro Tololo	DECam	·	1.6 km	MPC · JPL
782785	2014 HR_{261}	—	April 28, 2014	Cerro Tololo	DECam	·	1.2 km	MPC · JPL
782786	2014 HS_{263}	—	September 28, 2003	Kitt Peak	Spacewatch	·	800 m	MPC · JPL
782787	2014 HQ_{269}	—	April 24, 2014	Haleakala	Pan-STARRS 1	·	800 m	MPC · JPL
782788	2014 HH_{271}	—	November 25, 2016	Mount Lemmon	Mount Lemmon Survey	WIT	720 m	MPC · JPL
782789	2014 HV_{273}	—	April 22, 2014	Mount Lemmon	Mount Lemmon Survey	EMA	2.1 km	MPC · JPL
782790	2014 HY_{273}	—	April 29, 2014	Haleakala	Pan-STARRS 1	·	950 m	MPC · JPL
782791	2014 HM_{276}	—	September 10, 2016	Mount Lemmon	Mount Lemmon Survey	THM	1.4 km	MPC · JPL
782792	2014 HE_{292}	—	January 5, 2013	Kitt Peak	Spacewatch	·	1.9 km	MPC · JPL
782793	2014 HS_{299}	—	February 8, 2013	Haleakala	Pan-STARRS 1	·	2.5 km	MPC · JPL
782794	2014 HO_{300}	—	April 28, 2014	Cerro Tololo	DECam	·	2.5 km	MPC · JPL
782795	2014 HG_{301}	—	April 28, 2014	Cerro Tololo	DECam	·	2.8 km	MPC · JPL
782796	2014 HZ_{302}	—	October 19, 2011	Mayhill-ISON	L. Elenin	·	2.3 km	MPC · JPL
782797	2014 HU_{303}	—	April 28, 2014	Cerro Tololo	DECam	·	2.1 km	MPC · JPL
782798	2014 HK_{304}	—	April 29, 2014	Cerro Tololo	DECam	·	2.3 km	MPC · JPL
782799	2014 HM_{305}	—	April 23, 2014	Cerro Tololo	DECam	·	2.0 km	MPC · JPL
782800	2014 HN_{307}	—	April 24, 2014	Cerro Tololo	DECam	·	1.6 km	MPC · JPL

== 782801–782900 ==
back to top

Designation			Discovery			Properties		Ref
Permanent	Provisional	Named after	Date	Site	Discoverer(s)	Category	Diam.	Ref
782801	2014 HY_{307}	—	April 23, 2014	Cerro Tololo	DECam	THM	1.7 km	MPC · JPL
782802	2014 HE_{308}	—	April 23, 2014	Cerro Tololo	DECam	·	1.4 km	MPC · JPL
782803	2014 HY_{311}	—	April 23, 2014	Cerro Tololo	DECam	·	1.6 km	MPC · JPL
782804	2014 HP_{314}	—	April 23, 2014	Cerro Tololo	DECam	·	2.1 km	MPC · JPL
782805	2014 HJ_{317}	—	April 23, 2014	Cerro Tololo	DECam	MAR	800 m	MPC · JPL
782806	2014 HL_{319}	—	April 29, 2014	Haleakala	Pan-STARRS 1	·	1.9 km	MPC · JPL
782807	2014 HZ_{347}	—	April 23, 2014	Cerro Tololo	DECam	·	950 m	MPC · JPL
782808	2014 HE_{350}	—	April 28, 2014	Cerro Tololo	DECam	·	2.5 km	MPC · JPL
782809	2014 HY_{361}	—	April 23, 2014	Mount Lemmon	Mount Lemmon Survey	EOS	1.4 km	MPC · JPL
782810	2014 HY_{378}	—	October 7, 2007	Mount Lemmon	Mount Lemmon Survey	·	1.0 km	MPC · JPL
782811	2014 JL_{5}	—	January 14, 2013	Mount Lemmon	Mount Lemmon Survey	·	2.1 km	MPC · JPL
782812	2014 JO_{11}	—	May 3, 2014	Mount Lemmon	Mount Lemmon Survey	·	2.5 km	MPC · JPL
782813	2014 JZ_{25}	—	April 5, 2014	Haleakala	Pan-STARRS 1	·	2.6 km	MPC · JPL
782814	2014 JV_{32}	—	May 3, 2014	Mount Lemmon	Mount Lemmon Survey	·	2.4 km	MPC · JPL
782815	2014 JN_{40}	—	February 2, 2009	Mount Lemmon	Mount Lemmon Survey	EUN	970 m	MPC · JPL
782816	2014 JV_{40}	—	May 5, 2014	Mount Lemmon	Mount Lemmon Survey	·	1.5 km	MPC · JPL
782817	2014 JD_{50}	—	May 8, 2014	Haleakala	Pan-STARRS 1	·	1.3 km	MPC · JPL
782818	2014 JY_{50}	—	April 5, 2014	Haleakala	Pan-STARRS 1	·	860 m	MPC · JPL
782819	2014 JJ_{57}	—	May 9, 2014	Haleakala	Pan-STARRS 1	T_{j} (0.52) · damocloid · unusual	20 km	MPC · JPL
782820	2014 JV_{67}	—	February 22, 2009	Kitt Peak	Spacewatch	·	1.4 km	MPC · JPL
782821	2014 JR_{72}	—	May 8, 2014	Haleakala	Pan-STARRS 1	EUN	880 m	MPC · JPL
782822	2014 JG_{74}	—	April 30, 2014	Haleakala	Pan-STARRS 1	·	1.0 km	MPC · JPL
782823	2014 JK_{83}	—	January 18, 2009	Kitt Peak	Spacewatch	EUN	780 m	MPC · JPL
782824	2014 JY_{83}	—	May 8, 2014	Haleakala	Pan-STARRS 1	·	1.0 km	MPC · JPL
782825	2014 JM_{84}	—	May 20, 2006	Mount Lemmon	Mount Lemmon Survey	·	1.1 km	MPC · JPL
782826	2014 JZ_{85}	—	May 8, 2014	Haleakala	Pan-STARRS 1	·	2.7 km	MPC · JPL
782827	2014 JX_{87}	—	January 10, 2013	Haleakala	Pan-STARRS 1	·	1.6 km	MPC · JPL
782828	2014 JA_{88}	—	May 4, 2014	Kitt Peak	Spacewatch	·	1.0 km	MPC · JPL
782829	2014 JA_{89}	—	May 5, 2014	Haleakala	Pan-STARRS 1	·	2.7 km	MPC · JPL
782830	2014 JL_{90}	—	May 8, 2014	Haleakala	Pan-STARRS 1	AGN	850 m	MPC · JPL
782831	2014 JU_{96}	—	May 9, 2005	Kitt Peak	Spacewatch	·	1.2 km	MPC · JPL
782832	2014 JT_{100}	—	May 2, 2014	Mount Lemmon	Mount Lemmon Survey	TIR	2.0 km	MPC · JPL
782833	2014 JY_{102}	—	May 9, 2014	Haleakala	Pan-STARRS 1	·	1.3 km	MPC · JPL
782834	2014 JF_{105}	—	May 10, 2014	Haleakala	Pan-STARRS 1	T_{j} (2.88)	2.5 km	MPC · JPL
782835	2014 JH_{106}	—	May 6, 2014	Haleakala	Pan-STARRS 1	·	930 m	MPC · JPL
782836	2014 JN_{107}	—	May 7, 2014	Haleakala	Pan-STARRS 1	EOS	1.6 km	MPC · JPL
782837	2014 JH_{109}	—	May 2, 2014	Mount Lemmon	Mount Lemmon Survey	·	2.2 km	MPC · JPL
782838	2014 JV_{113}	—	May 8, 2014	Haleakala	Pan-STARRS 1	·	1.2 km	MPC · JPL
782839	2014 JU_{115}	—	May 7, 2014	Haleakala	Pan-STARRS 1	EUN	880 m	MPC · JPL
782840	2014 JB_{117}	—	May 7, 2014	Haleakala	Pan-STARRS 1	·	1.4 km	MPC · JPL
782841	2014 JN_{118}	—	May 8, 2014	Haleakala	Pan-STARRS 1	·	1.3 km	MPC · JPL
782842	2014 JF_{128}	—	May 3, 2014	Kitt Peak	Spacewatch	HNS	860 m	MPC · JPL
782843	2014 JJ_{129}	—	May 2, 2014	Kitt Peak	Spacewatch	·	1.3 km	MPC · JPL
782844	2014 JA_{131}	—	May 4, 2014	Haleakala	Pan-STARRS 1	EUN	880 m	MPC · JPL
782845	2014 JB_{132}	—	May 2, 2014	Cerro Tololo-DECam	DECam	·	690 m	MPC · JPL
782846	2014 JA_{134}	—	May 8, 2014	Haleakala	Pan-STARRS 1	·	2.2 km	MPC · JPL
782847	2014 JD_{139}	—	May 5, 2014	Cerro Tololo-DECam	DECam	EUN	910 m	MPC · JPL
782848	2014 JK_{140}	—	October 26, 2011	Haleakala	Pan-STARRS 1	·	2.0 km	MPC · JPL
782849	2014 JD_{143}	—	May 7, 2014	Haleakala	Pan-STARRS 1	·	1.4 km	MPC · JPL
782850	2014 JT_{146}	—	May 10, 2014	Haleakala	Pan-STARRS 1	·	1.2 km	MPC · JPL
782851	2014 JF_{151}	—	May 5, 2014	Cerro Tololo-DECam	DECam	·	1.8 km	MPC · JPL
782852	2014 KY_{5}	—	May 21, 2014	Haleakala	Pan-STARRS 1	·	710 m	MPC · JPL
782853	2014 KL_{11}	—	November 18, 2007	Kitt Peak	Spacewatch	·	1.2 km	MPC · JPL
782854	2014 KF_{14}	—	April 30, 2014	Haleakala	Pan-STARRS 1	·	2.2 km	MPC · JPL
782855	2014 KP_{15}	—	April 6, 2014	Mount Lemmon	Mount Lemmon Survey	·	2.5 km	MPC · JPL
782856	2014 KV_{18}	—	May 4, 2014	Haleakala	Pan-STARRS 1	·	1.3 km	MPC · JPL
782857	2014 KR_{29}	—	May 3, 2014	Mount Lemmon	Mount Lemmon Survey	·	900 m	MPC · JPL
782858	2014 KM_{33}	—	May 4, 2014	Mount Lemmon	Mount Lemmon Survey	ADE	1.3 km	MPC · JPL
782859	2014 KB_{37}	—	May 24, 2014	Mount Lemmon	Mount Lemmon Survey	·	1.4 km	MPC · JPL
782860	2014 KM_{38}	—	April 6, 2014	Mount Lemmon	Mount Lemmon Survey	THB	2.1 km	MPC · JPL
782861	2014 KV_{50}	—	May 21, 2014	Haleakala	Pan-STARRS 1	·	1.2 km	MPC · JPL
782862	2014 KW_{50}	—	April 2, 2009	Kitt Peak	Spacewatch	·	1.3 km	MPC · JPL
782863	2014 KY_{55}	—	May 24, 2014	Mount Lemmon	Mount Lemmon Survey	·	1.3 km	MPC · JPL
782864	2014 KK_{60}	—	February 12, 2008	Mount Lemmon	Mount Lemmon Survey	·	2.9 km	MPC · JPL
782865	2014 KX_{61}	—	August 14, 2006	Siding Spring	SSS	·	1.1 km	MPC · JPL
782866	2014 KV_{63}	—	May 21, 2014	Haleakala	Pan-STARRS 1	·	1.7 km	MPC · JPL
782867	2014 KC_{64}	—	December 14, 2006	Mount Lemmon	Mount Lemmon Survey	·	1.7 km	MPC · JPL
782868	2014 KV_{70}	—	May 7, 2014	Haleakala	Pan-STARRS 1	LIX	2.3 km	MPC · JPL
782869	2014 KD_{72}	—	May 23, 2014	Haleakala	Pan-STARRS 1	·	940 m	MPC · JPL
782870	2014 KV_{78}	—	May 8, 2014	Haleakala	Pan-STARRS 1	·	2.2 km	MPC · JPL
782871	2014 KR_{79}	—	May 20, 2014	Haleakala	Pan-STARRS 1	·	1.2 km	MPC · JPL
782872	2014 KF_{80}	—	May 10, 2014	Haleakala	Pan-STARRS 1	·	1.6 km	MPC · JPL
782873	2014 KU_{81}	—	February 15, 2013	Haleakala	Pan-STARRS 1	·	1.9 km	MPC · JPL
782874	2014 KG_{83}	—	April 6, 2008	Kitt Peak	Spacewatch	THM	1.8 km	MPC · JPL
782875	2014 KL_{87}	—	October 23, 2011	Haleakala	Pan-STARRS 1	·	1.6 km	MPC · JPL
782876	2014 KZ_{95}	—	May 7, 2014	Haleakala	Pan-STARRS 1	·	1.7 km	MPC · JPL
782877	2014 KG_{97}	—	May 7, 2014	Haleakala	Pan-STARRS 1	(5)	790 m	MPC · JPL
782878	2014 KV_{98}	—	October 14, 2010	Mount Lemmon	Mount Lemmon Survey	·	2.1 km	MPC · JPL
782879	2014 KW_{104}	—	May 8, 2014	Haleakala	Pan-STARRS 1	·	1.3 km	MPC · JPL
782880	2014 KA_{106}	—	January 10, 2013	Haleakala	Pan-STARRS 1	·	1.1 km	MPC · JPL
782881	2014 KY_{109}	—	May 23, 2014	Haleakala	Pan-STARRS 1	·	1.0 km	MPC · JPL
782882	2014 KU_{110}	—	May 24, 2014	Haleakala	Pan-STARRS 1	·	1.5 km	MPC · JPL
782883	2014 KG_{112}	—	May 28, 2014	Haleakala	Pan-STARRS 1	·	1.3 km	MPC · JPL
782884	2014 KC_{117}	—	May 21, 2014	Haleakala	Pan-STARRS 1	·	1.2 km	MPC · JPL
782885	2014 KD_{117}	—	September 23, 2015	Haleakala	Pan-STARRS 1	·	2.6 km	MPC · JPL
782886	2014 KK_{121}	—	January 9, 2018	Haleakala	Pan-STARRS 1	·	2.1 km	MPC · JPL
782887	2014 KX_{122}	—	May 7, 2014	Haleakala	Pan-STARRS 1	·	760 m	MPC · JPL
782888	2014 KT_{125}	—	May 21, 2014	Haleakala	Pan-STARRS 1	·	2.3 km	MPC · JPL
782889	2014 KB_{126}	—	May 21, 2014	Haleakala	Pan-STARRS 1	3:2 · SHU	4.0 km	MPC · JPL
782890	2014 KJ_{126}	—	May 27, 2014	Haleakala	Pan-STARRS 1	·	2.2 km	MPC · JPL
782891	2014 KC_{128}	—	May 21, 2014	Haleakala	Pan-STARRS 1	EOS	1.5 km	MPC · JPL
782892	2014 KH_{130}	—	April 18, 2009	Mount Lemmon	Mount Lemmon Survey	KOR	1.0 km	MPC · JPL
782893	2014 KO_{130}	—	May 23, 2014	Haleakala	Pan-STARRS 1	VER	1.7 km	MPC · JPL
782894	2014 KG_{131}	—	May 23, 2014	Haleakala	Pan-STARRS 1	·	2.1 km	MPC · JPL
782895	2014 KX_{134}	—	May 21, 2014	Haleakala	Pan-STARRS 1	NEM	1.7 km	MPC · JPL
782896	2014 KC_{135}	—	May 21, 2014	Haleakala	Pan-STARRS 1	·	1.3 km	MPC · JPL
782897	2014 KD_{135}	—	May 20, 2014	Haleakala	Pan-STARRS 1	AST	1.3 km	MPC · JPL
782898	2014 KP_{138}	—	May 27, 2014	Mount Lemmon	Mount Lemmon Survey	(1547)	1.4 km	MPC · JPL
782899	2014 KF_{140}	—	May 23, 2014	Haleakala	Pan-STARRS 1	·	2.3 km	MPC · JPL
782900	2014 KC_{141}	—	May 20, 2014	Haleakala	Pan-STARRS 1	·	2.2 km	MPC · JPL

== 782901–783000 ==
back to top

Designation			Discovery			Properties		Ref
Permanent	Provisional	Named after	Date	Site	Discoverer(s)	Category	Diam.	Ref
782901	2014 KF_{141}	—	May 21, 2014	Mount Lemmon	Mount Lemmon Survey	VER	2.0 km	MPC · JPL
782902	2014 KO_{141}	—	May 23, 2014	Haleakala	Pan-STARRS 1	·	2.2 km	MPC · JPL
782903	2014 KB_{143}	—	May 28, 2014	Haleakala	Pan-STARRS 1	·	1.4 km	MPC · JPL
782904	2014 KU_{143}	—	May 28, 2014	Haleakala	Pan-STARRS 1	·	1.2 km	MPC · JPL
782905	2014 KP_{144}	—	May 21, 2014	Mount Lemmon	Mount Lemmon Survey	·	1.3 km	MPC · JPL
782906	2014 KG_{148}	—	October 24, 2011	Haleakala	Pan-STARRS 1	EOS	1.2 km	MPC · JPL
782907	2014 KB_{150}	—	May 21, 2014	Haleakala	Pan-STARRS 1	WIT	670 m	MPC · JPL
782908	2014 KS_{153}	—	May 7, 2014	Haleakala	Pan-STARRS 1	BRG	960 m	MPC · JPL
782909	2014 KP_{154}	—	May 23, 2014	Haleakala	Pan-STARRS 1	·	830 m	MPC · JPL
782910	2014 KD_{155}	—	May 21, 2014	Haleakala	Pan-STARRS 1	·	960 m	MPC · JPL
782911	2014 KM_{157}	—	May 23, 2014	Haleakala	Pan-STARRS 1	·	2.3 km	MPC · JPL
782912	2014 KW_{157}	—	May 21, 2014	Haleakala	Pan-STARRS 1	URS	2.3 km	MPC · JPL
782913	2014 KA_{158}	—	May 22, 2014	Haleakala	Pan-STARRS 1	·	2.9 km	MPC · JPL
782914	2014 KB_{163}	—	February 5, 2013	Mount Lemmon	Mount Lemmon Survey	AGN	910 m	MPC · JPL
782915	2014 KE_{163}	—	May 21, 2014	Haleakala	Pan-STARRS 1	·	1.4 km	MPC · JPL
782916	2014 KK_{165}	—	May 20, 2014	Haleakala	Pan-STARRS 1	·	2.6 km	MPC · JPL
782917	2014 KM_{165}	—	May 6, 2019	Haleakala	Pan-STARRS 1	·	1.4 km	MPC · JPL
782918	2014 KN_{165}	—	May 20, 2014	Haleakala	Pan-STARRS 1	·	1.2 km	MPC · JPL
782919	2014 KX_{165}	—	May 20, 2014	Haleakala	Pan-STARRS 1	HNS	750 m	MPC · JPL
782920	2014 KT_{166}	—	July 6, 2010	Kitt Peak	Spacewatch	·	950 m	MPC · JPL
782921	2014 KP_{171}	—	May 23, 2014	Haleakala	Pan-STARRS 1	·	1.5 km	MPC · JPL
782922	2014 KV_{173}	—	May 25, 2014	Haleakala	Pan-STARRS 1	·	1.8 km	MPC · JPL
782923	2014 LM_{5}	—	April 22, 2009	Mount Lemmon	Mount Lemmon Survey	·	1.6 km	MPC · JPL
782924	2014 LB_{8}	—	May 7, 2014	Haleakala	Pan-STARRS 1	·	1.7 km	MPC · JPL
782925	2014 LA_{9}	—	May 7, 2014	Haleakala	Pan-STARRS 1	·	780 m	MPC · JPL
782926	2014 LL_{14}	—	January 30, 2004	Kitt Peak	Spacewatch	GEF	960 m	MPC · JPL
782927	2014 LM_{29}	—	June 6, 2014	Haleakala	Pan-STARRS 1	·	1.0 km	MPC · JPL
782928	2014 LN_{31}	—	June 3, 2014	Haleakala	Pan-STARRS 1	·	1.4 km	MPC · JPL
782929	2014 LR_{31}	—	June 3, 2014	Haleakala	Pan-STARRS 1	·	1.1 km	MPC · JPL
782930	2014 LC_{34}	—	June 4, 2014	Haleakala	Pan-STARRS 1	·	1.3 km	MPC · JPL
782931	2014 LT_{34}	—	June 5, 2014	Haleakala	Pan-STARRS 1	BAR	800 m	MPC · JPL
782932	2014 LL_{37}	—	June 4, 2014	Mount Lemmon	Mount Lemmon Survey	·	2.3 km	MPC · JPL
782933	2014 LY_{41}	—	June 5, 2014	Haleakala	Pan-STARRS 1	VER	2.0 km	MPC · JPL
782934	2014 MW_{13}	—	June 20, 2014	Kitt Peak	Spacewatch	·	1.1 km	MPC · JPL
782935	2014 MU_{24}	—	October 14, 2010	Catalina	CSS	·	1.6 km	MPC · JPL
782936	2014 MV_{24}	—	May 7, 2014	Haleakala	Pan-STARRS 1	EUN	830 m	MPC · JPL
782937	2014 MS_{40}	—	June 18, 2014	Haleakala	Pan-STARRS 1	·	1.2 km	MPC · JPL
782938	2014 MY_{41}	—	May 9, 2010	Catalina	CSS	BAR	1.1 km	MPC · JPL
782939	2014 MW_{57}	—	December 30, 2011	Kitt Peak	Spacewatch	·	1.4 km	MPC · JPL
782940	2014 MH_{61}	—	June 26, 2014	Haleakala	Pan-STARRS 1	·	1.5 km	MPC · JPL
782941	2014 MK_{62}	—	June 28, 2014	Kitt Peak	Spacewatch	·	1.3 km	MPC · JPL
782942	2014 MS_{71}	—	June 21, 2014	Haleakala	Pan-STARRS 1	·	1.1 km	MPC · JPL
782943	2014 MT_{72}	—	April 27, 2009	Mount Lemmon	Mount Lemmon Survey	·	1.3 km	MPC · JPL
782944	2014 ME_{73}	—	June 29, 2014	Haleakala	Pan-STARRS 1	·	840 m	MPC · JPL
782945	2014 MH_{73}	—	June 30, 2014	Haleakala	Pan-STARRS 1	·	2.3 km	MPC · JPL
782946	2014 MW_{73}	—	June 18, 2014	Haleakala	Pan-STARRS 1	EUN	990 m	MPC · JPL
782947	2014 MD_{74}	—	June 21, 2014	Haleakala	Pan-STARRS 1	·	1.0 km	MPC · JPL
782948 Ursache	2014 MT_{74}	Ursache	June 24, 2014	La Palma	EURONEAR	·	1.6 km	MPC · JPL
782949	2014 MF_{75}	—	June 24, 2014	Haleakala	Pan-STARRS 1	MAR	740 m	MPC · JPL
782950	2014 MO_{75}	—	January 13, 2011	Mount Lemmon	Mount Lemmon Survey	EOS	1.4 km	MPC · JPL
782951	2014 MQ_{79}	—	June 30, 2014	Haleakala	Pan-STARRS 1	·	1.5 km	MPC · JPL
782952	2014 MA_{81}	—	June 28, 2014	Haleakala	Pan-STARRS 1	·	1.3 km	MPC · JPL
782953	2014 MJ_{81}	—	December 6, 2010	Mount Lemmon	Mount Lemmon Survey	·	1.4 km	MPC · JPL
782954	2014 ME_{82}	—	June 27, 2014	Haleakala	Pan-STARRS 1	T_{j} (2.98) · 3:2 · (6124)	3.3 km	MPC · JPL
782955	2014 MT_{85}	—	June 27, 2014	Haleakala	Pan-STARRS 1	·	890 m	MPC · JPL
782956	2014 MQ_{86}	—	October 11, 2015	Mount Lemmon	Mount Lemmon Survey	·	2.5 km	MPC · JPL
782957	2014 MP_{90}	—	May 3, 2008	Mount Lemmon	Mount Lemmon Survey	·	2.3 km	MPC · JPL
782958	2014 MA_{93}	—	June 28, 2014	Haleakala	Pan-STARRS 1	·	1.1 km	MPC · JPL
782959	2014 MF_{97}	—	June 27, 2014	Haleakala	Pan-STARRS 1	·	2.2 km	MPC · JPL
782960	2014 MW_{101}	—	June 24, 2014	Haleakala	Pan-STARRS 1	·	1.2 km	MPC · JPL
782961	2014 MJ_{105}	—	June 30, 2014	Haleakala	Pan-STARRS 1	·	1.3 km	MPC · JPL
782962	2014 MG_{106}	—	August 30, 2002	Kitt Peak	Spacewatch	MAR	670 m	MPC · JPL
782963	2014 MJ_{107}	—	June 24, 2014	Haleakala	Pan-STARRS 1	·	1.4 km	MPC · JPL
782964	2014 NX_{2}	—	July 1, 2014	Mount Lemmon	Mount Lemmon Survey	·	1.7 km	MPC · JPL
782965	2014 NE_{4}	—	September 14, 2010	Mount Lemmon	Mount Lemmon Survey	·	1.2 km	MPC · JPL
782966	2014 ND_{6}	—	September 10, 2010	Kitt Peak	Spacewatch	·	1.4 km	MPC · JPL
782967	2014 NQ_{9}	—	September 29, 2010	Mount Lemmon	Mount Lemmon Survey	AST	1.3 km	MPC · JPL
782968	2014 NL_{14}	—	July 1, 2014	Haleakala	Pan-STARRS 1	·	1.1 km	MPC · JPL
782969	2014 NC_{15}	—	July 1, 2014	Haleakala	Pan-STARRS 1	(5)	830 m	MPC · JPL
782970	2014 NL_{15}	—	July 1, 2014	Haleakala	Pan-STARRS 1	·	1.2 km	MPC · JPL
782971	2014 NS_{15}	—	July 1, 2014	Haleakala	Pan-STARRS 1	·	770 m	MPC · JPL
782972	2014 NJ_{18}	—	May 28, 2014	Haleakala	Pan-STARRS 1	·	1.2 km	MPC · JPL
782973	2014 NY_{18}	—	April 2, 2009	Mount Lemmon	Mount Lemmon Survey	ADE	1.1 km	MPC · JPL
782974	2014 NK_{26}	—	May 25, 2014	Haleakala	Pan-STARRS 1	·	1.0 km	MPC · JPL
782975	2014 NB_{34}	—	July 2, 2014	Haleakala	Pan-STARRS 1	·	970 m	MPC · JPL
782976	2014 NV_{40}	—	July 3, 2014	Haleakala	Pan-STARRS 1	HNS	860 m	MPC · JPL
782977	2014 NX_{42}	—	April 6, 2005	Mount Lemmon	Mount Lemmon Survey	·	1.2 km	MPC · JPL
782978	2014 NS_{48}	—	July 3, 2014	Haleakala	Pan-STARRS 1	MAR	750 m	MPC · JPL
782979	2014 NY_{48}	—	July 3, 2014	Haleakala	Pan-STARRS 1	·	1.5 km	MPC · JPL
782980	2014 NM_{51}	—	October 7, 2010	Catalina	CSS	·	1.1 km	MPC · JPL
782981	2014 NC_{55}	—	June 28, 2014	Haleakala	Pan-STARRS 1	(5)	830 m	MPC · JPL
782982	2014 NK_{67}	—	July 8, 2014	Haleakala	Pan-STARRS 1	·	1.2 km	MPC · JPL
782983	2014 NP_{70}	—	July 3, 2014	Haleakala	Pan-STARRS 1	AGN	880 m	MPC · JPL
782984	2014 NH_{71}	—	February 26, 2009	Calar Alto	F. Hormuth	·	970 m	MPC · JPL
782985	2014 NY_{71}	—	November 14, 2010	Kitt Peak	Spacewatch	·	1.3 km	MPC · JPL
782986	2014 NO_{76}	—	May 13, 2018	Mount Lemmon	Mount Lemmon Survey	EUN	1.0 km	MPC · JPL
782987	2014 NM_{78}	—	January 28, 2017	Haleakala	Pan-STARRS 1	·	1.2 km	MPC · JPL
782988	2014 NY_{79}	—	July 8, 2014	Haleakala	Pan-STARRS 1	·	1.2 km	MPC · JPL
782989	2014 NJ_{80}	—	July 4, 2014	Haleakala	Pan-STARRS 1	MAR	780 m	MPC · JPL
782990	2014 NZ_{81}	—	July 7, 2014	Haleakala	Pan-STARRS 1	·	1.3 km	MPC · JPL
782991	2014 NO_{90}	—	July 1, 2014	Haleakala	Pan-STARRS 1	·	1.5 km	MPC · JPL
782992	2014 NJ_{93}	—	July 8, 2014	Haleakala	Pan-STARRS 1	·	910 m	MPC · JPL
782993	2014 NX_{96}	—	July 1, 2014	Haleakala	Pan-STARRS 1	HNS	630 m	MPC · JPL
782994	2014 OY_{5}	—	July 26, 2014	Elena Remote	Oreshko, A.	·	960 m	MPC · JPL
782995	2014 OV_{10}	—	September 25, 2005	Kitt Peak	Spacewatch	KOR	990 m	MPC · JPL
782996	2014 OR_{12}	—	February 12, 2008	Mount Lemmon	Mount Lemmon Survey	·	1.3 km	MPC · JPL
782997	2014 OH_{17}	—	September 6, 2010	Piszkés-tető	K. Sárneczky, Z. Kuli	·	1.2 km	MPC · JPL
782998	2014 OO_{19}	—	July 25, 2014	Haleakala	Pan-STARRS 1	·	1.4 km	MPC · JPL
782999	2014 OQ_{23}	—	July 25, 2014	Haleakala	Pan-STARRS 1	HNS	620 m	MPC · JPL
783000	2014 OX_{26}	—	June 27, 2014	Haleakala	Pan-STARRS 1	·	1.1 km	MPC · JPL

back to top

== Meaning of names ==
As minor planet discoveries are confirmed, they are given a permanent number by the IAU's Minor Planet Center (MPC), and the discoverers can then submit names for them, following the IAU's naming conventions. The list below concerns those minor planets in the specified number-range that have received names, and explains the meanings of those names.

Official naming citations of newly named small Solar System bodies are approved and published in a bulletin by IAU's Working Group for Small Bodies Nomenclature (WGSBN). Before May 2021, citations were published in MPC's Minor Planet Circulars for many decades. Recent citations can also be found on the JPL Small-Body Database (SBDB). Until his death in 2016, German astronomer Lutz D. Schmadel compiled these citations into the Dictionary of Minor Planet Names (DMP) and regularly updated the collection.

Based on Paul Herget's The Names of the Minor Planets, Schmadel also researched the unclear origin of numerous asteroids, most of which had been named prior to World War II. This article incorporates text from this source, which is in the public domain: SBDB New namings may only be added to this list below after official publication as the preannouncement of names is condemned. The WGSBN publishes a comprehensive guideline for the naming rules of non-cometary small Solar System bodies.

Named minor planet	Provisional	This minor planet was named for...	Ref · Catalog
782609 Becheș	2014 FM_{51}	Gavril Becheș, Romanian promoter of observational astronomy from Timisoara.	IAU · 782609
782948 Ursache	2014 MT_{74}	Felician Ursache, Romanian geodetic engineer and amateur astronomer.	IAU · 782948
