= List of minor planets: 656001–657000 =

The following is a partial list of minor planets, running from minor-planet number 656001 through 657000, inclusive. The primary data for this and other partial lists is based on JPL's "Small-Body Orbital Elements" and data available from the Minor Planet Center. Critical list information is also provided by the MPC, unless otherwise specified from Lowell Observatory. A detailed description of the table's columns and additional sources are given on the main page including a complete list of every page in this series, and a statistical break-up on the dynamical classification of minor planets.

Also see the summary list of all named bodies in numerical and alphabetical order, and the corresponding naming citations for the number range of this particular list. New namings may only be added to this list after official publication, as the preannouncement of names is condemned by the Working Group for Small Bodies Nomenclature of the International Astronomical Union.

Near-Earth obj.	MBA (inner)	MBA (outer)	Centaur
Mars-crosser	MBA (middle)	Jupiter trojan	Trans-Neptunian obj.
Unclassified

== 656001–656100 ==
Designation			Discovery			Properties		Ref
Permanent	Provisional	Named after	Date	Site	Discoverer(s)	Category	Diam.	Ref
656001	2015 TK_{317}	—	August 27, 2011	Haleakala	Pan-STARRS 1	·	670 m	MPC · JPL
656002	2015 TC_{318}	—	September 21, 2011	Mount Lemmon	Mount Lemmon Survey	·	880 m	MPC · JPL
656003	2015 TB_{319}	—	August 23, 2011	Haleakala	Pan-STARRS 1	MAS	540 m	MPC · JPL
656004	2015 TC_{319}	—	October 21, 2008	Kitt Peak	Spacewatch	·	1.0 km	MPC · JPL
656005	2015 TD_{321}	—	October 13, 2015	Space Surveillance	Space Surveillance Telescope	H	380 m	MPC · JPL
656006	2015 TX_{321}	—	September 23, 2009	Catalina	CSS	T_{j} (2.97)	4.9 km	MPC · JPL
656007	2015 TW_{327}	—	December 23, 2012	Haleakala	Pan-STARRS 1	·	990 m	MPC · JPL
656008	2015 TN_{332}	—	May 15, 2013	Haleakala	Pan-STARRS 1	·	2.9 km	MPC · JPL
656009	2015 TP_{333}	—	November 7, 2008	Mount Lemmon	Mount Lemmon Survey	V	450 m	MPC · JPL
656010	2015 TX_{336}	—	December 22, 2008	Kitt Peak	Spacewatch	NYS	1 km	MPC · JPL
656011	2015 TD_{341}	—	December 28, 2005	Kitt Peak	Spacewatch	·	2.7 km	MPC · JPL
656012	2015 TC_{343}	—	August 11, 2015	Haleakala	Pan-STARRS 1	H	380 m	MPC · JPL
656013	2015 TO_{343}	—	March 10, 2002	Kitt Peak	Spacewatch	NYS	980 m	MPC · JPL
656014	2015 TP_{343}	—	October 10, 2015	Haleakala	Pan-STARRS 1	·	830 m	MPC · JPL
656015	2015 TL_{345}	—	September 18, 2011	Mount Lemmon	Mount Lemmon Survey	·	760 m	MPC · JPL
656016	2015 TP_{346}	—	August 27, 2011	Haleakala	Pan-STARRS 1	·	1.1 km	MPC · JPL
656017	2015 TG_{351}	—	October 2, 2015	Mount Lemmon	Mount Lemmon Survey	H	360 m	MPC · JPL
656018	2015 TU_{358}	—	October 15, 2015	Mount Lemmon	Mount Lemmon Survey	MAR	910 m	MPC · JPL
656019	2015 TQ_{364}	—	October 26, 2011	Haleakala	Pan-STARRS 1	·	880 m	MPC · JPL
656020	2015 TU_{364}	—	October 15, 2007	Mount Lemmon	Mount Lemmon Survey	·	780 m	MPC · JPL
656021	2015 TW_{365}	—	April 17, 2010	Cerro Burek	Burek, Cerro	·	1.6 km	MPC · JPL
656022	2015 TZ_{368}	—	February 7, 2006	Kitt Peak	Spacewatch	V	540 m	MPC · JPL
656023	2015 TP_{369}	—	February 14, 2012	Haleakala	Pan-STARRS 1	·	2.8 km	MPC · JPL
656024	2015 TD_{372}	—	October 8, 2015	Haleakala	Pan-STARRS 1	·	1 km	MPC · JPL
656025	2015 TF_{372}	—	October 25, 2011	Haleakala	Pan-STARRS 1	·	810 m	MPC · JPL
656026	2015 TN_{373}	—	October 8, 2015	Haleakala	Pan-STARRS 1	RAF	680 m	MPC · JPL
656027	2015 TG_{379}	—	October 10, 2015	Haleakala	Pan-STARRS 1	·	970 m	MPC · JPL
656028	2015 TF_{380}	—	November 3, 2011	Mount Lemmon	Mount Lemmon Survey	PHO	780 m	MPC · JPL
656029	2015 TD_{386}	—	June 26, 2014	ESA OGS	ESA OGS	MAR	1.2 km	MPC · JPL
656030	2015 TG_{394}	—	October 10, 2015	Haleakala	Pan-STARRS 1	·	940 m	MPC · JPL
656031	2015 TZ_{406}	—	October 9, 2015	Haleakala	Pan-STARRS 1	·	920 m	MPC · JPL
656032	2015 TC_{410}	—	October 10, 2015	Haleakala	Pan-STARRS 1	·	2.6 km	MPC · JPL
656033	2015 TA_{411}	—	October 12, 2015	Haleakala	Pan-STARRS 1	·	990 m	MPC · JPL
656034	2015 TC_{443}	—	October 8, 2015	Mount Lemmon	Mount Lemmon Survey	·	630 m	MPC · JPL
656035	2015 TV_{443}	—	October 4, 2015	Mount Lemmon	Mount Lemmon Survey	V	520 m	MPC · JPL
656036	2015 TZ_{443}	—	October 12, 2015	Haleakala	Pan-STARRS 1	·	810 m	MPC · JPL
656037	2015 UG_{1}	—	February 24, 2006	Kitt Peak	Spacewatch	·	810 m	MPC · JPL
656038	2015 UK_{1}	—	August 3, 2011	Haleakala	Pan-STARRS 1	·	960 m	MPC · JPL
656039	2015 UA_{4}	—	September 14, 2007	Kitt Peak	Spacewatch	3:2 · SHU	3.7 km	MPC · JPL
656040	2015 US_{5}	—	January 29, 2009	Kitt Peak	Spacewatch	·	830 m	MPC · JPL
656041	2015 UV_{9}	—	October 19, 2000	Kitt Peak	Spacewatch	·	960 m	MPC · JPL
656042	2015 UG_{12}	—	February 25, 2006	Kitt Peak	Spacewatch	MAS	520 m	MPC · JPL
656043	2015 UL_{12}	—	February 27, 2014	Kitt Peak	Spacewatch	·	650 m	MPC · JPL
656044	2015 UY_{14}	—	April 5, 2014	Haleakala	Pan-STARRS 1	·	1.4 km	MPC · JPL
656045	2015 UV_{16}	—	September 29, 2008	Kitt Peak	Spacewatch	V	520 m	MPC · JPL
656046	2015 UR_{20}	—	February 3, 2013	Haleakala	Pan-STARRS 1	MAS	560 m	MPC · JPL
656047	2015 UC_{23}	—	October 28, 2008	Kitt Peak	Spacewatch	V	470 m	MPC · JPL
656048	2015 UJ_{25}	—	October 18, 2015	Haleakala	Pan-STARRS 1	HOF	2.0 km	MPC · JPL
656049	2015 UM_{26}	—	October 18, 2015	Haleakala	Pan-STARRS 1	·	900 m	MPC · JPL
656050	2015 UQ_{26}	—	September 9, 2015	Haleakala	Pan-STARRS 1	NYS	830 m	MPC · JPL
656051	2015 UO_{30}	—	September 23, 2011	Haleakala	Pan-STARRS 1	·	770 m	MPC · JPL
656052	2015 UK_{42}	—	March 25, 2014	Haleakala	Pan-STARRS 1	·	780 m	MPC · JPL
656053	2015 UV_{44}	—	September 23, 2011	Haleakala	Pan-STARRS 1	·	930 m	MPC · JPL
656054	2015 UN_{47}	—	March 11, 2007	Catalina	CSS	·	3.6 km	MPC · JPL
656055	2015 UK_{50}	—	October 25, 2011	Haleakala	Pan-STARRS 1	·	1.3 km	MPC · JPL
656056	2015 UO_{50}	—	July 25, 2014	Haleakala	Pan-STARRS 1	·	1.5 km	MPC · JPL
656057	2015 UG_{54}	—	April 20, 2007	Mount Lemmon	Mount Lemmon Survey	·	2.9 km	MPC · JPL
656058	2015 UK_{59}	—	September 11, 2015	Haleakala	Pan-STARRS 1	PHO	960 m	MPC · JPL
656059	2015 UM_{61}	—	October 7, 2004	Kitt Peak	Spacewatch	·	2.9 km	MPC · JPL
656060	2015 UN_{61}	—	February 3, 2013	Haleakala	Pan-STARRS 1	·	960 m	MPC · JPL
656061	2015 UM_{62}	—	January 10, 2013	Haleakala	Pan-STARRS 1	·	1.1 km	MPC · JPL
656062	2015 UR_{62}	—	October 6, 2004	Kitt Peak	Spacewatch	·	790 m	MPC · JPL
656063	2015 UG_{66}	—	October 21, 2015	Haleakala	Pan-STARRS 1	KRM	1.9 km	MPC · JPL
656064 Vladimirasmolov	2015 UR_{66}	Vladimirasmolov	July 16, 2010	Zelenchukskaya Stn	T. V. Krjačko, Satovski, B.	EUN	1.1 km	MPC · JPL
656065	2015 UO_{70}	—	October 23, 2004	Kitt Peak	Spacewatch	·	1.0 km	MPC · JPL
656066	2015 UV_{72}	—	October 10, 2015	Kitt Peak	Spacewatch	·	1.0 km	MPC · JPL
656067	2015 UA_{78}	—	October 4, 2012	Haleakala	Pan-STARRS 1	H	570 m	MPC · JPL
656068	2015 UA_{79}	—	July 29, 2009	Cerro Burek	Burek, Cerro	TIR	3.8 km	MPC · JPL
656069	2015 UO_{81}	—	February 24, 2009	Mount Lemmon	Mount Lemmon Survey	PHO	660 m	MPC · JPL
656070	2015 US_{84}	—	November 8, 2007	Mount Lemmon	Mount Lemmon Survey	H	430 m	MPC · JPL
656071	2015 UT_{86}	—	October 29, 2015	Haleakala	Pan-STARRS 1	·	3.1 km	MPC · JPL
656072	2015 VO_{2}	—	November 6, 2010	Mount Lemmon	Mount Lemmon Survey	H	560 m	MPC · JPL
656073	2015 VQ_{3}	—	February 2, 2005	Kitt Peak	Spacewatch	·	1.1 km	MPC · JPL
656074	2015 VW_{3}	—	October 29, 2005	Kitt Peak	Spacewatch	·	3.0 km	MPC · JPL
656075	2015 VK_{12}	—	October 24, 2008	Kitt Peak	Spacewatch	MAS	520 m	MPC · JPL
656076	2015 VD_{17}	—	August 22, 2004	Kitt Peak	Spacewatch	·	850 m	MPC · JPL
656077	2015 VU_{22}	—	October 13, 2015	Haleakala	Pan-STARRS 1	·	830 m	MPC · JPL
656078	2015 VJ_{27}	—	February 21, 2009	Kitt Peak	Spacewatch	·	790 m	MPC · JPL
656079	2015 VE_{29}	—	September 26, 2011	Catalina	CSS	·	1.0 km	MPC · JPL
656080	2015 VB_{41}	—	October 5, 2004	Anderson Mesa	LONEOS	·	890 m	MPC · JPL
656081	2015 VC_{47}	—	July 12, 2001	Palomar	NEAT	·	590 m	MPC · JPL
656082	2015 VC_{49}	—	September 22, 2008	Mount Lemmon	Mount Lemmon Survey	·	620 m	MPC · JPL
656083	2015 VG_{53}	—	February 28, 2014	Haleakala	Pan-STARRS 1	·	640 m	MPC · JPL
656084	2015 VK_{57}	—	November 2, 2015	Haleakala	Pan-STARRS 1	·	2.3 km	MPC · JPL
656085	2015 VY_{57}	—	November 21, 2000	Socorro	LINEAR	·	990 m	MPC · JPL
656086	2015 VJ_{60}	—	December 21, 2008	Mount Lemmon	Mount Lemmon Survey	·	1.1 km	MPC · JPL
656087	2015 VZ_{63}	—	November 6, 2015	Mount Lemmon	Mount Lemmon Survey	H	510 m	MPC · JPL
656088	2015 VM_{66}	—	November 9, 2015	Mount Lemmon	Mount Lemmon Survey	H	580 m	MPC · JPL
656089	2015 VK_{68}	—	August 9, 2015	Haleakala	Pan-STARRS 2	MAS	630 m	MPC · JPL
656090	2015 VG_{70}	—	February 26, 2014	Haleakala	Pan-STARRS 1	·	660 m	MPC · JPL
656091	2015 VL_{73}	—	March 10, 2007	Mount Lemmon	Mount Lemmon Survey	·	1.8 km	MPC · JPL
656092	2015 VA_{74}	—	October 4, 2004	Palomar	NEAT	·	1.2 km	MPC · JPL
656093	2015 VL_{74}	—	September 8, 2011	Haleakala	Pan-STARRS 1	·	1.3 km	MPC · JPL
656094	2015 VJ_{90}	—	October 29, 2008	Mount Lemmon	Mount Lemmon Survey	·	3.6 km	MPC · JPL
656095	2015 VO_{91}	—	September 20, 2011	Mount Lemmon	Mount Lemmon Survey	·	820 m	MPC · JPL
656096	2015 VS_{96}	—	August 12, 2015	Haleakala	Pan-STARRS 1	H	460 m	MPC · JPL
656097	2015 VH_{101}	—	October 12, 1999	Kitt Peak	Spacewatch	3:2	3.6 km	MPC · JPL
656098	2015 VM_{112}	—	February 28, 2014	Haleakala	Pan-STARRS 1	PHO	880 m	MPC · JPL
656099	2015 VU_{112}	—	January 16, 2013	Haleakala	Pan-STARRS 1	NYS	1.0 km	MPC · JPL
656100	2015 VB_{115}	—	December 22, 2008	Kitt Peak	Spacewatch	NYS	1.0 km	MPC · JPL

== 656101–656200 ==
back to top

Designation			Discovery			Properties		Ref
Permanent	Provisional	Named after	Date	Site	Discoverer(s)	Category	Diam.	Ref
656101	2015 VG_{117}	—	November 10, 2004	Kitt Peak	Spacewatch	·	1.0 km	MPC · JPL
656102	2015 VF_{123}	—	December 3, 2010	Kitt Peak	Spacewatch	·	2.8 km	MPC · JPL
656103	2015 VO_{123}	—	November 1, 2015	Catalina	CSS	RAF	780 m	MPC · JPL
656104	2015 VF_{126}	—	July 3, 2014	Haleakala	Pan-STARRS 1	T_{j} (2.93) · 3:2	4.7 km	MPC · JPL
656105	2015 VX_{126}	—	January 20, 2009	Kitt Peak	Spacewatch	·	1.0 km	MPC · JPL
656106	2015 VP_{129}	—	February 17, 2013	Mount Lemmon	Mount Lemmon Survey	·	970 m	MPC · JPL
656107	2015 VG_{130}	—	November 3, 2004	Palomar	NEAT	·	1.1 km	MPC · JPL
656108	2015 VF_{133}	—	October 11, 2004	Moletai	K. Černis, Zdanavicius, J.	·	1.3 km	MPC · JPL
656109	2015 VO_{136}	—	October 20, 2007	Mount Lemmon	Mount Lemmon Survey	·	1.0 km	MPC · JPL
656110	2015 VR_{138}	—	January 16, 2009	Mount Lemmon	Mount Lemmon Survey	NYS	950 m	MPC · JPL
656111	2015 VG_{139}	—	March 12, 2013	Kitt Peak	Research and Education Collaborative Occultation Network	THM	2.1 km	MPC · JPL
656112	2015 VV_{139}	—	September 23, 2011	Haleakala	Pan-STARRS 1	NYS	970 m	MPC · JPL
656113	2015 VE_{140}	—	October 20, 2011	Kitt Peak	Spacewatch	·	850 m	MPC · JPL
656114	2015 VR_{140}	—	July 3, 2011	Mount Lemmon	Mount Lemmon Survey	·	690 m	MPC · JPL
656115	2015 VF_{141}	—	September 19, 2003	Palomar	NEAT	·	4.6 km	MPC · JPL
656116	2015 VP_{141}	—	December 18, 2007	Kitt Peak	Spacewatch	·	930 m	MPC · JPL
656117	2015 VY_{141}	—	September 23, 2009	Kitt Peak	Spacewatch	·	2.1 km	MPC · JPL
656118	2015 VO_{147}	—	December 26, 2011	Mount Lemmon	Mount Lemmon Survey	·	970 m	MPC · JPL
656119	2015 VA_{153}	—	May 24, 2014	Haleakala	Pan-STARRS 1	H	530 m	MPC · JPL
656120	2015 VT_{155}	—	May 2, 2006	Mount Lemmon	Mount Lemmon Survey	V	510 m	MPC · JPL
656121	2015 VT_{158}	—	November 6, 2010	Mount Lemmon	Mount Lemmon Survey	·	1.8 km	MPC · JPL
656122	2015 VZ_{159}	—	November 18, 2011	Catalina	CSS	PHO	880 m	MPC · JPL
656123	2015 VK_{160}	—	January 19, 2012	Haleakala	Pan-STARRS 1	(5)	990 m	MPC · JPL
656124	2015 VH_{161}	—	November 16, 2011	Mount Lemmon	Mount Lemmon Survey	·	960 m	MPC · JPL
656125	2015 VH_{163}	—	November 13, 2015	Mount Lemmon	Mount Lemmon Survey	·	970 m	MPC · JPL
656126	2015 VQ_{163}	—	November 13, 2015	Mount Lemmon	Mount Lemmon Survey	·	1.2 km	MPC · JPL
656127	2015 VV_{173}	—	November 7, 2015	Mount Lemmon	Mount Lemmon Survey	·	790 m	MPC · JPL
656128	2015 VZ_{184}	—	November 7, 2015	Mauna Kea	S. S. Sheppard	plutino	134 km	MPC · JPL
656129	2015 VE_{202}	—	November 1, 2015	Nogales	M. Schwartz, P. R. Holvorcem	·	870 m	MPC · JPL
656130	2015 VP_{203}	—	November 7, 2015	Mount Lemmon	Mount Lemmon Survey	·	770 m	MPC · JPL
656131	2015 VD_{205}	—	November 10, 2015	Mount Lemmon	Mount Lemmon Survey	·	1.2 km	MPC · JPL
656132	2015 VD_{211}	—	November 12, 2015	Mount Lemmon	Mount Lemmon Survey	·	1.2 km	MPC · JPL
656133	2015 VG_{213}	—	November 3, 2015	Haleakala	Pan-STARRS 1	·	1.1 km	MPC · JPL
656134	2015 WM_{1}	—	April 22, 2009	Mount Lemmon	Mount Lemmon Survey	H	450 m	MPC · JPL
656135	2015 WN_{3}	—	October 9, 2007	Mount Lemmon	Mount Lemmon Survey	·	1.1 km	MPC · JPL
656136	2015 WV_{6}	—	September 20, 2007	Mount Lemmon	Mount Lemmon Survey	·	1.2 km	MPC · JPL
656137	2015 WX_{8}	—	November 12, 2015	Mount Lemmon	Mount Lemmon Survey	·	990 m	MPC · JPL
656138	2015 WJ_{9}	—	January 26, 2012	Catalina	CSS	·	1.8 km	MPC · JPL
656139	2015 WU_{11}	—	October 16, 2015	Mount Lemmon	Mount Lemmon Survey	·	970 m	MPC · JPL
656140	2015 WC_{14}	—	October 9, 2004	Socorro	LINEAR	·	3.5 km	MPC · JPL
656141	2015 WQ_{14}	—	May 23, 2014	Haleakala	Pan-STARRS 1	·	1.2 km	MPC · JPL
656142	2015 WU_{14}	—	November 25, 2011	Haleakala	Pan-STARRS 1	·	1.0 km	MPC · JPL
656143	2015 WZ_{14}	—	November 25, 2011	Haleakala	Pan-STARRS 1	·	990 m	MPC · JPL
656144	2015 WG_{16}	—	May 26, 2006	Mount Lemmon	Mount Lemmon Survey	·	1.1 km	MPC · JPL
656145	2015 WR_{16}	—	November 16, 2015	Haleakala	Pan-STARRS 1	H	440 m	MPC · JPL
656146	2015 WP_{17}	—	October 28, 2011	Mount Lemmon	Mount Lemmon Survey	·	1.0 km	MPC · JPL
656147	2015 WJ_{18}	—	October 25, 2011	Haleakala	Pan-STARRS 1	MAR	590 m	MPC · JPL
656148	2015 WO_{18}	—	January 13, 2008	Catalina	CSS	EUN	1.2 km	MPC · JPL
656149	2015 WK_{19}	—	March 7, 2013	Kitt Peak	Spacewatch	NYS	850 m	MPC · JPL
656150	2015 WO_{19}	—	August 22, 2014	Haleakala	Pan-STARRS 1	·	1.3 km	MPC · JPL
656151	2015 WY_{19}	—	November 17, 2015	Haleakala	Pan-STARRS 1	·	980 m	MPC · JPL
656152	2015 WN_{22}	—	November 19, 2015	Mount Lemmon	Mount Lemmon Survey	·	1.1 km	MPC · JPL
656153	2015 WY_{28}	—	November 23, 2015	Haleakala	Pan-STARRS 1	·	2.1 km	MPC · JPL
656154	2015 WO_{29}	—	November 19, 2015	Mount Lemmon	Mount Lemmon Survey	H	380 m	MPC · JPL
656155	2015 WY_{40}	—	November 21, 2015	Mount Lemmon	Mount Lemmon Survey	(5)	960 m	MPC · JPL
656156	2015 XJ	—	May 24, 2009	Catalina	CSS	H	380 m	MPC · JPL
656157	2015 XH_{8}	—	October 25, 2011	Haleakala	Pan-STARRS 1	·	1.1 km	MPC · JPL
656158	2015 XX_{8}	—	January 15, 2008	Kitt Peak	Spacewatch	·	1.3 km	MPC · JPL
656159	2015 XY_{20}	—	December 4, 2008	Mount Lemmon	Mount Lemmon Survey	NYS	870 m	MPC · JPL
656160	2015 XE_{26}	—	October 8, 2007	Kitt Peak	Spacewatch	3:2	3.5 km	MPC · JPL
656161	2015 XP_{30}	—	May 4, 2014	Mount Lemmon	Mount Lemmon Survey	·	1.1 km	MPC · JPL
656162	2015 XR_{34}	—	October 26, 2011	Haleakala	Pan-STARRS 1	·	1.1 km	MPC · JPL
656163	2015 XX_{35}	—	November 13, 2015	Kitt Peak	Spacewatch	·	1.2 km	MPC · JPL
656164	2015 XF_{47}	—	March 26, 2010	Kitt Peak	Spacewatch	·	880 m	MPC · JPL
656165	2015 XV_{55}	—	November 19, 2015	Mount Lemmon	Mount Lemmon Survey	H	400 m	MPC · JPL
656166	2015 XW_{60}	—	October 4, 2004	Kitt Peak	Spacewatch	EOS	1.4 km	MPC · JPL
656167	2015 XJ_{65}	—	December 1, 2015	Haleakala	Pan-STARRS 1	·	890 m	MPC · JPL
656168	2015 XK_{72}	—	July 9, 2011	Haleakala	Pan-STARRS 1	·	1.3 km	MPC · JPL
656169	2015 XG_{94}	—	December 30, 2008	Kitt Peak	Spacewatch	·	880 m	MPC · JPL
656170	2015 XX_{98}	—	January 13, 2005	Kitt Peak	Spacewatch	·	830 m	MPC · JPL
656171	2015 XU_{104}	—	December 4, 2015	Haleakala	Pan-STARRS 1	·	990 m	MPC · JPL
656172	2015 XK_{105}	—	November 20, 2015	Kitt Peak	Spacewatch	·	840 m	MPC · JPL
656173	2015 XK_{110}	—	January 31, 2009	Mount Lemmon	Mount Lemmon Survey	·	920 m	MPC · JPL
656174	2015 XX_{118}	—	May 26, 2014	Haleakala	Pan-STARRS 1	EUN	920 m	MPC · JPL
656175	2015 XK_{125}	—	March 19, 2009	Mount Lemmon	Mount Lemmon Survey	MAR	860 m	MPC · JPL
656176	2015 XQ_{127}	—	November 23, 2015	Haleakala	Pan-STARRS 1	HNS	1.4 km	MPC · JPL
656177	2015 XE_{133}	—	October 29, 2005	Mount Lemmon	Mount Lemmon Survey	·	450 m	MPC · JPL
656178	2015 XY_{133}	—	March 12, 2010	Kitt Peak	Spacewatch	NYS	1.1 km	MPC · JPL
656179	2015 XP_{137}	—	September 15, 2010	Les Engarouines	L. Bernasconi	·	2.0 km	MPC · JPL
656180	2015 XN_{142}	—	January 1, 2008	Kitt Peak	Spacewatch	(5)	1.0 km	MPC · JPL
656181	2015 XO_{145}	—	November 20, 2015	Kitt Peak	Spacewatch	·	2.5 km	MPC · JPL
656182	2015 XC_{152}	—	December 25, 2005	Kitt Peak	Spacewatch	·	2.3 km	MPC · JPL
656183	2015 XC_{154}	—	July 25, 2015	Haleakala	Pan-STARRS 1	·	860 m	MPC · JPL
656184	2015 XZ_{160}	—	August 9, 2004	Socorro	LINEAR	·	1.7 km	MPC · JPL
656185	2015 XY_{161}	—	March 21, 2014	Mount Lemmon	Mount Lemmon Survey	PHO	880 m	MPC · JPL
656186	2015 XD_{162}	—	September 12, 2015	Haleakala	Pan-STARRS 1	·	3.5 km	MPC · JPL
656187	2015 XM_{166}	—	January 10, 2006	Kitt Peak	Spacewatch	·	1.6 km	MPC · JPL
656188	2015 XT_{167}	—	January 29, 2012	Haleakala	Pan-STARRS 1	·	1.2 km	MPC · JPL
656189	2015 XJ_{168}	—	November 19, 2007	Catalina	CSS	BAR	2.2 km	MPC · JPL
656190	2015 XW_{171}	—	November 2, 2015	Mount Lemmon	Mount Lemmon Survey	(5)	1.1 km	MPC · JPL
656191	2015 XN_{190}	—	January 20, 2009	Kitt Peak	Spacewatch	·	940 m	MPC · JPL
656192	2015 XQ_{195}	—	October 12, 2007	Kitt Peak	Spacewatch	·	970 m	MPC · JPL
656193	2015 XO_{199}	—	October 8, 2015	Mount Lemmon	Mount Lemmon Survey	·	1.4 km	MPC · JPL
656194	2015 XB_{201}	—	October 15, 2002	Palomar	NEAT	·	3.8 km	MPC · JPL
656195	2015 XD_{201}	—	November 27, 2000	Kitt Peak	Spacewatch	·	890 m	MPC · JPL
656196 Falchi	2015 XA_{204}	Falchi	December 2, 2015	La Palma	EURONEAR	·	840 m	MPC · JPL
656197	2015 XZ_{205}	—	September 11, 2007	Mount Lemmon	Mount Lemmon Survey	MAS	710 m	MPC · JPL
656198	2015 XZ_{206}	—	April 10, 2013	Haleakala	Pan-STARRS 1	MAS	530 m	MPC · JPL
656199	2015 XT_{207}	—	December 9, 2004	Kitt Peak	Spacewatch	·	930 m	MPC · JPL
656200	2015 XK_{208}	—	June 3, 2006	Mauna Kea	D. D. Balam	·	1.2 km	MPC · JPL

== 656201–656300 ==
back to top

Designation			Discovery			Properties		Ref
Permanent	Provisional	Named after	Date	Site	Discoverer(s)	Category	Diam.	Ref
656201	2015 XL_{209}	—	January 20, 2009	Mount Lemmon	Mount Lemmon Survey	·	870 m	MPC · JPL
656202	2015 XJ_{212}	—	January 27, 2007	Mount Lemmon	Mount Lemmon Survey	·	1.6 km	MPC · JPL
656203	2015 XV_{212}	—	August 19, 2006	Kitt Peak	Spacewatch	3:2	3.4 km	MPC · JPL
656204	2015 XZ_{212}	—	April 16, 2013	Cerro Tololo-DECam	DECam	·	970 m	MPC · JPL
656205	2015 XT_{216}	—	November 3, 2015	Mount Lemmon	Mount Lemmon Survey	·	840 m	MPC · JPL
656206	2015 XH_{232}	—	October 26, 2011	Haleakala	Pan-STARRS 1	·	920 m	MPC · JPL
656207	2015 XT_{235}	—	December 6, 2015	Haleakala	Pan-STARRS 1	·	750 m	MPC · JPL
656208	2015 XC_{238}	—	March 15, 2004	Kitt Peak	Spacewatch	·	1.2 km	MPC · JPL
656209	2015 XU_{239}	—	September 11, 2007	Mount Lemmon	Mount Lemmon Survey	·	930 m	MPC · JPL
656210	2015 XF_{242}	—	November 10, 2015	Mount Lemmon	Mount Lemmon Survey	KON	2.0 km	MPC · JPL
656211	2015 XQ_{248}	—	May 23, 2014	Haleakala	Pan-STARRS 1	·	1.3 km	MPC · JPL
656212	2015 XO_{250}	—	May 30, 2014	Haleakala	Pan-STARRS 1	EUN	1 km	MPC · JPL
656213	2015 XG_{266}	—	April 29, 2006	Kitt Peak	Spacewatch	PHO	710 m	MPC · JPL
656214	2015 XJ_{276}	—	November 22, 2015	Mount Lemmon	Mount Lemmon Survey	·	910 m	MPC · JPL
656215	2015 XE_{281}	—	August 22, 2014	Haleakala	Pan-STARRS 1	·	1.6 km	MPC · JPL
656216	2015 XM_{281}	—	May 20, 2014	Haleakala	Pan-STARRS 1	·	830 m	MPC · JPL
656217	2015 XW_{294}	—	August 28, 2014	Haleakala	Pan-STARRS 1	·	1.1 km	MPC · JPL
656218	2015 XE_{303}	—	September 25, 2009	Mount Lemmon	Mount Lemmon Survey	·	2.2 km	MPC · JPL
656219	2015 XB_{308}	—	December 7, 2015	Haleakala	Pan-STARRS 1	·	1.2 km	MPC · JPL
656220	2015 XD_{311}	—	September 17, 2003	Kitt Peak	Spacewatch	·	2.8 km	MPC · JPL
656221	2015 XO_{315}	—	November 25, 2011	Haleakala	Pan-STARRS 1	·	800 m	MPC · JPL
656222	2015 XD_{318}	—	July 30, 2014	Kitt Peak	Spacewatch	MAS	640 m	MPC · JPL
656223	2015 XA_{323}	—	October 18, 2011	Mount Lemmon	Mount Lemmon Survey	NYS	890 m	MPC · JPL
656224	2015 XL_{325}	—	November 7, 2008	Mount Lemmon	Mount Lemmon Survey	·	600 m	MPC · JPL
656225	2015 XN_{325}	—	July 16, 2005	Kitt Peak	Spacewatch	·	1.9 km	MPC · JPL
656226	2015 XQ_{335}	—	February 14, 2013	Haleakala	Pan-STARRS 1	V	580 m	MPC · JPL
656227	2015 XO_{343}	—	October 27, 2011	Mount Lemmon	Mount Lemmon Survey	·	940 m	MPC · JPL
656228	2015 XL_{344}	—	June 22, 2010	Mount Lemmon	Mount Lemmon Survey	·	1.2 km	MPC · JPL
656229	2015 XU_{352}	—	December 8, 2015	Mount Lemmon	Mount Lemmon Survey	·	1.1 km	MPC · JPL
656230	2015 XW_{352}	—	July 29, 2014	Haleakala	Pan-STARRS 1	·	740 m	MPC · JPL
656231	2015 XN_{359}	—	October 4, 2004	Kitt Peak	Spacewatch	·	2.0 km	MPC · JPL
656232	2015 XU_{362}	—	December 9, 2015	Mount Lemmon	Mount Lemmon Survey	·	960 m	MPC · JPL
656233	2015 XD_{365}	—	September 16, 2006	Anderson Mesa	LONEOS	·	1.6 km	MPC · JPL
656234	2015 XR_{365}	—	December 30, 2007	Mount Lemmon	Mount Lemmon Survey	·	1.2 km	MPC · JPL
656235	2015 XH_{369}	—	December 31, 2007	Mount Lemmon	Mount Lemmon Survey	·	890 m	MPC · JPL
656236	2015 XS_{373}	—	October 11, 2010	Mount Lemmon	Mount Lemmon Survey	HOF	2.0 km	MPC · JPL
656237	2015 XH_{377}	—	December 9, 2015	Bergisch Gladbach	W. Bickel	·	920 m	MPC · JPL
656238	2015 XO_{380}	—	December 13, 2015	Oukaïmeden	C. Rinner	·	1.4 km	MPC · JPL
656239	2015 XA_{384}	—	June 5, 2014	Haleakala	Pan-STARRS 1	EUN	990 m	MPC · JPL
656240	2015 XC_{385}	—	May 8, 2006	Kitt Peak	Spacewatch	H	370 m	MPC · JPL
656241	2015 XN_{385}	—	December 6, 2015	Mount Lemmon	Mount Lemmon Survey	H	440 m	MPC · JPL
656242	2015 XQ_{385}	—	December 9, 2015	Haleakala	Pan-STARRS 1	H	460 m	MPC · JPL
656243	2015 XW_{386}	—	December 9, 2015	Haleakala	Pan-STARRS 1	H	430 m	MPC · JPL
656244	2015 XX_{386}	—	December 9, 2015	Haleakala	Pan-STARRS 1	H	340 m	MPC · JPL
656245	2015 XV_{388}	—	December 8, 2015	Haleakala	Pan-STARRS 1	H	370 m	MPC · JPL
656246	2015 XE_{390}	—	December 7, 2015	Haleakala	Pan-STARRS 1	·	1 km	MPC · JPL
656247	2015 XT_{394}	—	April 4, 2005	Mount Lemmon	Mount Lemmon Survey	·	1.3 km	MPC · JPL
656248	2015 XV_{394}	—	December 3, 2015	Haleakala	Pan-STARRS 1	·	1.2 km	MPC · JPL
656249	2015 XZ_{395}	—	September 19, 2014	Haleakala	Pan-STARRS 1	·	1.2 km	MPC · JPL
656250	2015 XK_{396}	—	July 1, 2005	Kitt Peak	Spacewatch	MAR	1.0 km	MPC · JPL
656251	2015 XS_{396}	—	March 10, 2007	Mount Lemmon	Mount Lemmon Survey	·	1.4 km	MPC · JPL
656252	2015 XH_{398}	—	December 9, 2015	Haleakala	Pan-STARRS 1	MAR	1.0 km	MPC · JPL
656253	2015 XN_{398}	—	January 19, 2012	Haleakala	Pan-STARRS 1	·	940 m	MPC · JPL
656254	2015 XB_{399}	—	December 14, 2015	Mount Lemmon	Mount Lemmon Survey	·	1.2 km	MPC · JPL
656255	2015 XB_{401}	—	October 1, 2014	Haleakala	Pan-STARRS 1	·	1.6 km	MPC · JPL
656256	2015 XD_{403}	—	October 25, 2011	Kitt Peak	Spacewatch	·	1.1 km	MPC · JPL
656257	2015 XG_{403}	—	September 3, 2014	Mount Lemmon	Mount Lemmon Survey	KOR	1.2 km	MPC · JPL
656258	2015 XF_{404}	—	December 14, 2015	Haleakala	Pan-STARRS 1	·	880 m	MPC · JPL
656259	2015 XT_{406}	—	December 4, 2015	Haleakala	Pan-STARRS 1	EUN	810 m	MPC · JPL
656260	2015 XZ_{406}	—	November 16, 2006	Kitt Peak	Spacewatch	·	1.8 km	MPC · JPL
656261	2015 XJ_{408}	—	July 25, 2014	Haleakala	Pan-STARRS 1	·	760 m	MPC · JPL
656262	2015 XK_{409}	—	December 7, 2015	Haleakala	Pan-STARRS 1	HNS	920 m	MPC · JPL
656263	2015 XG_{411}	—	March 1, 2005	Kitt Peak	Spacewatch	·	810 m	MPC · JPL
656264	2015 XE_{412}	—	December 8, 2015	Haleakala	Pan-STARRS 1	·	1.0 km	MPC · JPL
656265	2015 XK_{414}	—	December 9, 2015	Haleakala	Pan-STARRS 1	EUN	890 m	MPC · JPL
656266	2015 XN_{414}	—	November 10, 2010	Mount Lemmon	Mount Lemmon Survey	·	1.1 km	MPC · JPL
656267	2015 XV_{414}	—	March 30, 2003	Kitt Peak	Deep Ecliptic Survey	·	1.4 km	MPC · JPL
656268	2015 XP_{416}	—	March 31, 2008	Kitt Peak	Spacewatch	·	1.4 km	MPC · JPL
656269	2015 XE_{418}	—	December 13, 2015	Haleakala	Pan-STARRS 1	·	820 m	MPC · JPL
656270	2015 XT_{418}	—	February 25, 2012	Kitt Peak	Spacewatch	·	990 m	MPC · JPL
656271	2015 XB_{419}	—	December 13, 2015	Haleakala	Pan-STARRS 1	ADE	1.5 km	MPC · JPL
656272	2015 XC_{420}	—	November 5, 2010	Mount Lemmon	Mount Lemmon Survey	·	1.2 km	MPC · JPL
656273	2015 XS_{442}	—	December 6, 2015	Mount Lemmon	Mount Lemmon Survey	·	940 m	MPC · JPL
656274	2015 XG_{443}	—	December 14, 2015	Mount Lemmon	Mount Lemmon Survey	·	950 m	MPC · JPL
656275	2015 XM_{443}	—	July 27, 2014	Haleakala	Pan-STARRS 1	·	1.0 km	MPC · JPL
656276	2015 XA_{444}	—	December 8, 2015	Haleakala	Pan-STARRS 1	·	960 m	MPC · JPL
656277	2015 XL_{444}	—	December 8, 2015	Haleakala	Pan-STARRS 1	(5)	870 m	MPC · JPL
656278	2015 XE_{447}	—	December 9, 2015	Haleakala	Pan-STARRS 1	·	1 km	MPC · JPL
656279	2015 XQ_{450}	—	October 25, 2012	Mount Lemmon	Mount Lemmon Survey	H	380 m	MPC · JPL
656280	2015 XF_{459}	—	December 13, 2015	Haleakala	Pan-STARRS 1	ADE	1.6 km	MPC · JPL
656281	2015 XH_{470}	—	December 14, 2015	Haleakala	Pan-STARRS 1	·	870 m	MPC · JPL
656282	2015 XX_{470}	—	December 14, 2015	Haleakala	Pan-STARRS 1	·	1.3 km	MPC · JPL
656283	2015 XL_{471}	—	December 5, 2015	Haleakala	Pan-STARRS 1	(194)	970 m	MPC · JPL
656284	2015 XW_{476}	—	December 8, 2015	Haleakala	Pan-STARRS 1	HNS	960 m	MPC · JPL
656285	2015 XQ_{490}	—	November 18, 2011	Mount Lemmon	Mount Lemmon Survey	·	1.3 km	MPC · JPL
656286	2015 YV_{7}	—	November 15, 2007	Catalina	CSS	H	450 m	MPC · JPL
656287	2015 YG_{11}	—	April 12, 2013	Siding Spring	SSS	·	1.2 km	MPC · JPL
656288	2015 YY_{15}	—	October 21, 2006	Kitt Peak	Spacewatch	·	1.1 km	MPC · JPL
656289	2015 YC_{16}	—	September 18, 2006	Catalina	CSS	·	1.4 km	MPC · JPL
656290	2015 YN_{17}	—	February 26, 2012	Catalina	CSS	·	1.2 km	MPC · JPL
656291	2015 YJ_{18}	—	January 1, 2012	Mount Lemmon	Mount Lemmon Survey	·	810 m	MPC · JPL
656292	2015 YZ_{18}	—	December 5, 2010	Mount Lemmon	Mount Lemmon Survey	H	420 m	MPC · JPL
656293	2015 YX_{21}	—	October 19, 2012	Mount Lemmon	Mount Lemmon Survey	H	400 m	MPC · JPL
656294	2015 YQ_{23}	—	December 18, 2015	Mount Lemmon	Mount Lemmon Survey	·	1.7 km	MPC · JPL
656295	2015 YZ_{23}	—	February 13, 2004	Kitt Peak	Spacewatch	·	880 m	MPC · JPL
656296	2015 YS_{24}	—	November 26, 2009	Kitt Peak	Spacewatch	·	2.0 km	MPC · JPL
656297	2015 YJ_{27}	—	January 18, 2012	Kitt Peak	Spacewatch	EUN	1 km	MPC · JPL
656298	2015 YP_{32}	—	December 18, 2015	Mount Lemmon	Mount Lemmon Survey	·	1.0 km	MPC · JPL
656299	2015 YW_{35}	—	December 19, 2015	Mount Lemmon	Mount Lemmon Survey	·	890 m	MPC · JPL
656300	2016 AQ_{1}	—	September 29, 2009	Mount Lemmon	Mount Lemmon Survey	·	1.7 km	MPC · JPL

== 656301–656400 ==
back to top

Designation			Discovery			Properties		Ref
Permanent	Provisional	Named after	Date	Site	Discoverer(s)	Category	Diam.	Ref
656301	2016 AE_{6}	—	December 27, 2011	Mount Lemmon	Mount Lemmon Survey	·	810 m	MPC · JPL
656302	2016 AW_{7}	—	September 12, 2015	Haleakala	Pan-STARRS 1	H	380 m	MPC · JPL
656303	2016 AC_{8}	—	October 2, 2006	Mount Lemmon	Mount Lemmon Survey	(5)	1.2 km	MPC · JPL
656304	2016 AQ_{10}	—	September 26, 2006	Kitt Peak	Spacewatch	·	1 km	MPC · JPL
656305	2016 AJ_{12}	—	November 7, 2015	Haleakala	Pan-STARRS 1	·	1.1 km	MPC · JPL
656306	2016 AN_{19}	—	February 11, 2008	Kitt Peak	Spacewatch	·	1.1 km	MPC · JPL
656307	2016 AT_{19}	—	February 27, 2006	Kitt Peak	Spacewatch	·	930 m	MPC · JPL
656308	2016 AC_{32}	—	March 26, 2006	Mount Lemmon	Mount Lemmon Survey	THM	2.3 km	MPC · JPL
656309	2016 AJ_{34}	—	July 25, 2014	Haleakala	Pan-STARRS 1	·	990 m	MPC · JPL
656310	2016 AL_{36}	—	January 3, 2016	Haleakala	Pan-STARRS 1	·	1.6 km	MPC · JPL
656311	2016 AS_{36}	—	December 31, 2007	Kitt Peak	Spacewatch	·	960 m	MPC · JPL
656312	2016 AT_{36}	—	February 1, 2012	Kitt Peak	Spacewatch	(5)	1.1 km	MPC · JPL
656313	2016 AA_{41}	—	March 2, 2009	Mount Lemmon	Mount Lemmon Survey	V	670 m	MPC · JPL
656314	2016 AJ_{41}	—	January 26, 2012	Mount Lemmon	Mount Lemmon Survey	·	850 m	MPC · JPL
656315	2016 AG_{45}	—	November 8, 2007	Kitt Peak	Spacewatch	·	1.2 km	MPC · JPL
656316	2016 AL_{50}	—	August 23, 2014	Haleakala	Pan-STARRS 1	·	1.2 km	MPC · JPL
656317	2016 AD_{51}	—	March 6, 2008	Mount Lemmon	Mount Lemmon Survey	·	1.2 km	MPC · JPL
656318	2016 AM_{52}	—	February 12, 2004	Kitt Peak	Spacewatch	·	930 m	MPC · JPL
656319	2016 AO_{57}	—	January 4, 2016	Haleakala	Pan-STARRS 1	·	1.5 km	MPC · JPL
656320	2016 AO_{59}	—	December 27, 2011	Mount Lemmon	Mount Lemmon Survey	(5)	1.1 km	MPC · JPL
656321	2016 AK_{62}	—	January 15, 2008	Kitt Peak	Spacewatch	·	780 m	MPC · JPL
656322	2016 AQ_{62}	—	January 4, 2016	Haleakala	Pan-STARRS 1	·	1.6 km	MPC · JPL
656323	2016 AH_{63}	—	August 29, 2006	Kitt Peak	Spacewatch	·	880 m	MPC · JPL
656324	2016 AC_{66}	—	August 13, 2006	Palomar	NEAT	H	630 m	MPC · JPL
656325	2016 AB_{67}	—	January 5, 2003	Socorro	LINEAR	·	1.5 km	MPC · JPL
656326	2016 AU_{72}	—	June 22, 2014	Haleakala	Pan-STARRS 1	·	1 km	MPC · JPL
656327	2016 AN_{74}	—	October 21, 2008	Mount Lemmon	Mount Lemmon Survey	·	3.5 km	MPC · JPL
656328	2016 AK_{77}	—	February 25, 2011	Mount Lemmon	Mount Lemmon Survey	·	2.1 km	MPC · JPL
656329	2016 AR_{77}	—	January 13, 2008	Kitt Peak	Spacewatch	3:2 · SHU	4.3 km	MPC · JPL
656330	2016 AE_{78}	—	October 24, 2015	Haleakala	Pan-STARRS 1	HNS	1.1 km	MPC · JPL
656331	2016 AK_{79}	—	May 22, 2001	Cerro Tololo	Deep Ecliptic Survey	·	1.4 km	MPC · JPL
656332	2016 AK_{81}	—	January 5, 2016	Haleakala	Pan-STARRS 1	·	980 m	MPC · JPL
656333	2016 AB_{89}	—	December 8, 2015	Mount Lemmon	Mount Lemmon Survey	(5)	990 m	MPC · JPL
656334	2016 AO_{90}	—	March 19, 2001	Kitt Peak	Spacewatch	NYS	1.1 km	MPC · JPL
656335	2016 AV_{94}	—	October 21, 2006	Catalina	CSS	·	1.1 km	MPC · JPL
656336	2016 AD_{98}	—	April 17, 2012	Kitt Peak	Spacewatch	·	1.7 km	MPC · JPL
656337	2016 AY_{98}	—	July 7, 2014	Haleakala	Pan-STARRS 1	·	870 m	MPC · JPL
656338	2016 AV_{100}	—	January 7, 2016	Haleakala	Pan-STARRS 1	·	1.2 km	MPC · JPL
656339	2016 AH_{101}	—	June 28, 2014	Haleakala	Pan-STARRS 1	EUN	960 m	MPC · JPL
656340	2016 AF_{102}	—	September 2, 2010	Mount Lemmon	Mount Lemmon Survey	MAR	730 m	MPC · JPL
656341	2016 AK_{102}	—	October 2, 2006	Mount Lemmon	Mount Lemmon Survey	·	880 m	MPC · JPL
656342	2016 AR_{103}	—	January 30, 2012	Mount Lemmon	Mount Lemmon Survey	·	1.1 km	MPC · JPL
656343	2016 AA_{104}	—	January 11, 2008	Kitt Peak	Spacewatch	·	910 m	MPC · JPL
656344	2016 AF_{104}	—	February 26, 2012	Haleakala	Pan-STARRS 1	·	1.2 km	MPC · JPL
656345	2016 AO_{104}	—	December 28, 2011	Mount Lemmon	Mount Lemmon Survey	EUN	1.0 km	MPC · JPL
656346	2016 AV_{105}	—	January 25, 2007	Kitt Peak	Spacewatch	·	1.6 km	MPC · JPL
656347	2016 AM_{107}	—	February 13, 2012	Haleakala	Pan-STARRS 1	·	1.4 km	MPC · JPL
656348	2016 AN_{108}	—	December 19, 2007	Kitt Peak	Spacewatch	·	1.2 km	MPC · JPL
656349	2016 AN_{112}	—	April 5, 2008	Mount Lemmon	Mount Lemmon Survey	·	1.3 km	MPC · JPL
656350	2016 AQ_{113}	—	February 16, 2012	Haleakala	Pan-STARRS 1	(5)	950 m	MPC · JPL
656351	2016 AG_{115}	—	August 31, 2014	Catalina	CSS	·	1.9 km	MPC · JPL
656352	2016 AM_{116}	—	February 29, 2012	Mount Lemmon	Mount Lemmon Survey	·	1.2 km	MPC · JPL
656353	2016 AM_{117}	—	January 16, 2003	Palomar	NEAT	(1547)	1.2 km	MPC · JPL
656354	2016 AY_{118}	—	October 16, 2014	Nogales	M. Schwartz, P. R. Holvorcem	HNS	1.2 km	MPC · JPL
656355	2016 AP_{119}	—	February 13, 2012	Haleakala	Pan-STARRS 1	·	880 m	MPC · JPL
656356	2016 AA_{121}	—	February 10, 2008	Kitt Peak	Spacewatch	·	790 m	MPC · JPL
656357	2016 AU_{123}	—	April 22, 2012	Mount Lemmon	Mount Lemmon Survey	·	1.3 km	MPC · JPL
656358	2016 AB_{124}	—	March 2, 2008	Mount Lemmon	Mount Lemmon Survey	·	1.4 km	MPC · JPL
656359	2016 AX_{125}	—	September 16, 2010	Mount Lemmon	Mount Lemmon Survey	·	1.2 km	MPC · JPL
656360	2016 AW_{127}	—	February 1, 2003	Palomar	NEAT	·	1.9 km	MPC · JPL
656361	2016 AX_{130}	—	November 4, 2004	Socorro	LINEAR	H	630 m	MPC · JPL
656362	2016 AK_{138}	—	April 4, 2008	Mount Lemmon	Mount Lemmon Survey	·	1.3 km	MPC · JPL
656363	2016 AL_{138}	—	January 9, 2016	Haleakala	Pan-STARRS 1	·	1.9 km	MPC · JPL
656364	2016 AB_{146}	—	December 6, 2015	Haleakala	Pan-STARRS 1	·	1.3 km	MPC · JPL
656365	2016 AM_{146}	—	February 26, 2008	Mount Lemmon	Mount Lemmon Survey	·	900 m	MPC · JPL
656366	2016 AY_{147}	—	December 4, 2015	Haleakala	Pan-STARRS 1	H	460 m	MPC · JPL
656367	2016 AN_{148}	—	October 14, 2014	Mount Lemmon	Mount Lemmon Survey	·	1.6 km	MPC · JPL
656368	2016 AO_{154}	—	September 24, 2014	Mount Lemmon	Mount Lemmon Survey	MAR	700 m	MPC · JPL
656369	2016 AP_{160}	—	January 11, 2016	Haleakala	Pan-STARRS 1	HNS	920 m	MPC · JPL
656370	2016 AT_{162}	—	March 20, 2007	Catalina	CSS	·	2.0 km	MPC · JPL
656371	2016 AR_{163}	—	December 11, 2014	Mount Lemmon	Mount Lemmon Survey	·	2.6 km	MPC · JPL
656372	2016 AL_{166}	—	December 6, 2015	Mount Lemmon	Mount Lemmon Survey	HNS	1.1 km	MPC · JPL
656373	2016 AS_{166}	—	February 16, 2012	Haleakala	Pan-STARRS 1	(5)	990 m	MPC · JPL
656374	2016 AV_{174}	—	November 25, 2002	Palomar	NEAT	·	1.4 km	MPC · JPL
656375	2016 AO_{177}	—	November 2, 2010	Mount Lemmon	Mount Lemmon Survey	·	1.1 km	MPC · JPL
656376	2016 AC_{180}	—	July 3, 2008	Mount Lemmon	Mount Lemmon Survey	·	2.2 km	MPC · JPL
656377	2016 AC_{181}	—	December 10, 2014	Haleakala	Pan-STARRS 1	HNS	1.0 km	MPC · JPL
656378	2016 AU_{181}	—	November 17, 2006	Kitt Peak	Spacewatch	·	1.2 km	MPC · JPL
656379	2016 AG_{183}	—	June 23, 2009	Mount Lemmon	Mount Lemmon Survey	·	1.1 km	MPC · JPL
656380	2016 AH_{189}	—	August 20, 2014	Haleakala	Pan-STARRS 1	T_{j} (2.98) · 3:2	4.0 km	MPC · JPL
656381	2016 AE_{192}	—	January 13, 2016	Haleakala	Pan-STARRS 1	·	1.3 km	MPC · JPL
656382	2016 AK_{195}	—	May 18, 2002	Palomar	NEAT	H	600 m	MPC · JPL
656383	2016 AM_{196}	—	June 22, 2014	Mount Lemmon	Mount Lemmon Survey	H	390 m	MPC · JPL
656384	2016 AY_{198}	—	January 9, 2016	Haleakala	Pan-STARRS 1	H	390 m	MPC · JPL
656385	2016 AG_{200}	—	January 1, 2016	Haleakala	Pan-STARRS 1	·	840 m	MPC · JPL
656386	2016 AQ_{203}	—	January 3, 2016	Mount Lemmon	Mount Lemmon Survey	EUN	800 m	MPC · JPL
656387	2016 AF_{212}	—	January 12, 2016	Haleakala	Pan-STARRS 1	·	1.3 km	MPC · JPL
656388	2016 AC_{216}	—	January 17, 2005	Kitt Peak	Spacewatch	·	2.3 km	MPC · JPL
656389	2016 AL_{216}	—	March 14, 2005	Mount Lemmon	Mount Lemmon Survey	NYS	1 km	MPC · JPL
656390	2016 AP_{216}	—	December 18, 2015	Mount Lemmon	Mount Lemmon Survey	NYS	970 m	MPC · JPL
656391	2016 AT_{216}	—	September 24, 2008	Kitt Peak	Spacewatch	·	2.4 km	MPC · JPL
656392	2016 AJ_{217}	—	January 7, 2016	Haleakala	Pan-STARRS 1	V	540 m	MPC · JPL
656393	2016 AU_{218}	—	January 4, 2016	Haleakala	Pan-STARRS 1	HNS	1.2 km	MPC · JPL
656394	2016 AA_{220}	—	September 19, 2014	Haleakala	Pan-STARRS 1	·	1.4 km	MPC · JPL
656395	2016 AQ_{220}	—	January 1, 2016	Haleakala	Pan-STARRS 1	·	930 m	MPC · JPL
656396	2016 AC_{221}	—	October 1, 2014	Haleakala	Pan-STARRS 1	·	1.3 km	MPC · JPL
656397	2016 AG_{221}	—	August 27, 2014	Haleakala	Pan-STARRS 1	V	530 m	MPC · JPL
656398	2016 AL_{221}	—	January 4, 2016	Haleakala	Pan-STARRS 1	·	1.0 km	MPC · JPL
656399	2016 AO_{221}	—	January 18, 2008	Kitt Peak	Spacewatch	·	930 m	MPC · JPL
656400	2016 AW_{221}	—	January 8, 2016	Haleakala	Pan-STARRS 1	·	1.0 km	MPC · JPL

== 656401–656500 ==
back to top

Designation			Discovery			Properties		Ref
Permanent	Provisional	Named after	Date	Site	Discoverer(s)	Category	Diam.	Ref
656401	2016 AC_{222}	—	October 2, 2006	Mount Lemmon	Mount Lemmon Survey	·	790 m	MPC · JPL
656402	2016 AR_{222}	—	January 14, 2016	Haleakala	Pan-STARRS 1	·	1.4 km	MPC · JPL
656403	2016 AS_{222}	—	April 15, 2012	Haleakala	Pan-STARRS 1	·	1.4 km	MPC · JPL
656404	2016 AU_{222}	—	November 1, 2006	Mount Lemmon	Mount Lemmon Survey	(5)	900 m	MPC · JPL
656405	2016 AJ_{223}	—	August 22, 2014	Haleakala	Pan-STARRS 1	·	940 m	MPC · JPL
656406	2016 AZ_{224}	—	March 30, 2008	Catalina	CSS	·	1.7 km	MPC · JPL
656407	2016 AB_{225}	—	February 3, 2012	Mount Lemmon	Mount Lemmon Survey	·	1.6 km	MPC · JPL
656408	2016 AT_{225}	—	November 22, 2015	Mount Lemmon	Mount Lemmon Survey	EUN	1.1 km	MPC · JPL
656409	2016 AW_{225}	—	April 29, 2008	Mount Lemmon	Mount Lemmon Survey	·	1.2 km	MPC · JPL
656410	2016 AD_{226}	—	January 4, 2016	Haleakala	Pan-STARRS 1	·	730 m	MPC · JPL
656411	2016 AF_{226}	—	December 18, 2007	Mount Lemmon	Mount Lemmon Survey	NYS	1.0 km	MPC · JPL
656412	2016 AQ_{226}	—	January 8, 2016	Haleakala	Pan-STARRS 1	·	820 m	MPC · JPL
656413	2016 AF_{227}	—	November 16, 2014	Mount Lemmon	Mount Lemmon Survey	·	1.2 km	MPC · JPL
656414	2016 AL_{227}	—	February 10, 2008	Kitt Peak	Spacewatch	(5)	750 m	MPC · JPL
656415	2016 AW_{232}	—	March 16, 2012	Haleakala	Pan-STARRS 1	·	1.6 km	MPC · JPL
656416	2016 AH_{235}	—	October 1, 2014	Haleakala	Pan-STARRS 1	·	1.2 km	MPC · JPL
656417	2016 AJ_{236}	—	January 4, 2016	Haleakala	Pan-STARRS 1	·	1.2 km	MPC · JPL
656418	2016 AQ_{236}	—	October 10, 2008	Mount Lemmon	Mount Lemmon Survey	EOS	1.8 km	MPC · JPL
656419	2016 AR_{236}	—	March 16, 2012	Mount Lemmon	Mount Lemmon Survey	ADE	1.3 km	MPC · JPL
656420	2016 AV_{236}	—	July 13, 2013	Haleakala	Pan-STARRS 1	·	1.9 km	MPC · JPL
656421	2016 AL_{238}	—	February 16, 2012	Haleakala	Pan-STARRS 1	·	1.6 km	MPC · JPL
656422	2016 AP_{238}	—	December 27, 2011	Mount Lemmon	Mount Lemmon Survey	HNS	1.1 km	MPC · JPL
656423	2016 AQ_{238}	—	March 26, 2003	Apache Point	SDSS Collaboration	HNS	1.1 km	MPC · JPL
656424	2016 AA_{241}	—	March 14, 2012	Haleakala	Pan-STARRS 1	·	1.6 km	MPC · JPL
656425	2016 AO_{241}	—	December 12, 2006	Kitt Peak	Spacewatch	·	1.2 km	MPC · JPL
656426	2016 AA_{243}	—	June 4, 2013	Mount Lemmon	Mount Lemmon Survey	·	1.1 km	MPC · JPL
656427	2016 AT_{246}	—	November 22, 2006	Kitt Peak	Spacewatch	·	1.1 km	MPC · JPL
656428	2016 AS_{247}	—	November 14, 2015	Mount Lemmon	Mount Lemmon Survey	·	950 m	MPC · JPL
656429	2016 AQ_{248}	—	October 13, 2010	Mount Lemmon	Mount Lemmon Survey	·	980 m	MPC · JPL
656430	2016 AR_{250}	—	January 3, 2012	Mount Lemmon	Mount Lemmon Survey	·	1.1 km	MPC · JPL
656431	2016 AV_{254}	—	April 1, 2012	Mount Lemmon	Mount Lemmon Survey	KOR	1.1 km	MPC · JPL
656432	2016 AA_{255}	—	January 7, 2016	Haleakala	Pan-STARRS 1	EOS	1.5 km	MPC · JPL
656433	2016 AS_{255}	—	January 3, 2016	Haleakala	Pan-STARRS 1	MAR	660 m	MPC · JPL
656434	2016 AO_{256}	—	May 6, 2008	Mount Lemmon	Mount Lemmon Survey	·	1.4 km	MPC · JPL
656435	2016 AH_{258}	—	December 30, 2007	Kitt Peak	Spacewatch	·	1.1 km	MPC · JPL
656436	2016 AA_{262}	—	October 30, 2014	Mount Lemmon	Mount Lemmon Survey	·	1.2 km	MPC · JPL
656437	2016 AO_{262}	—	August 15, 2013	Haleakala	Pan-STARRS 1	·	1.3 km	MPC · JPL
656438	2016 AB_{263}	—	January 8, 2016	Haleakala	Pan-STARRS 1	·	1.2 km	MPC · JPL
656439	2016 AP_{264}	—	January 19, 2012	Haleakala	Pan-STARRS 1	·	830 m	MPC · JPL
656440	2016 AR_{265}	—	January 9, 2016	Haleakala	Pan-STARRS 1	·	1.4 km	MPC · JPL
656441	2016 AF_{267}	—	January 11, 2016	Haleakala	Pan-STARRS 1	·	890 m	MPC · JPL
656442	2016 AC_{268}	—	January 25, 2003	Apache Point	SDSS Collaboration	·	1.4 km	MPC · JPL
656443	2016 AR_{268}	—	January 12, 2016	Haleakala	Pan-STARRS 1	EUN	1.2 km	MPC · JPL
656444	2016 AY_{269}	—	January 11, 2008	Mount Lemmon	Mount Lemmon Survey	·	850 m	MPC · JPL
656445	2016 AH_{271}	—	March 2, 2008	Mount Lemmon	Mount Lemmon Survey	·	1.1 km	MPC · JPL
656446	2016 AS_{271}	—	December 31, 2007	Kitt Peak	Spacewatch	MAR	880 m	MPC · JPL
656447	2016 AV_{271}	—	November 20, 2014	Haleakala	Pan-STARRS 1	·	2.0 km	MPC · JPL
656448	2016 AX_{271}	—	October 10, 2010	Mount Lemmon	Mount Lemmon Survey	·	780 m	MPC · JPL
656449	2016 AF_{273}	—	January 14, 2016	Haleakala	Pan-STARRS 1	·	1.4 km	MPC · JPL
656450	2016 AH_{276}	—	September 27, 2006	Kitt Peak	Spacewatch	·	790 m	MPC · JPL
656451	2016 AD_{277}	—	September 1, 2005	Palomar	NEAT	·	1.3 km	MPC · JPL
656452	2016 AS_{278}	—	January 14, 2016	Haleakala	Pan-STARRS 1	·	2.9 km	MPC · JPL
656453	2016 AU_{306}	—	January 3, 2016	Mount Lemmon	Mount Lemmon Survey	·	1.2 km	MPC · JPL
656454	2016 AA_{315}	—	January 8, 2016	Haleakala	Pan-STARRS 1	EUN	960 m	MPC · JPL
656455	2016 AN_{329}	—	January 9, 2016	Haleakala	Pan-STARRS 1	·	870 m	MPC · JPL
656456	2016 AX_{339}	—	January 2, 2016	Haleakala	Pan-STARRS 1	·	1.2 km	MPC · JPL
656457	2016 AS_{340}	—	January 4, 2016	Haleakala	Pan-STARRS 1	HNS	880 m	MPC · JPL
656458	2016 AO_{341}	—	January 14, 2016	Haleakala	Pan-STARRS 1	·	1.6 km	MPC · JPL
656459	2016 AN_{345}	—	September 26, 2014	Kitt Peak	Spacewatch	·	1.5 km	MPC · JPL
656460	2016 AZ_{345}	—	December 19, 2015	Catalina	CSS	·	1.4 km	MPC · JPL
656461	2016 AQ_{348}	—	January 4, 2016	Haleakala	Pan-STARRS 1	·	820 m	MPC · JPL
656462	2016 AV_{349}	—	January 9, 2016	Haleakala	Pan-STARRS 1	3:2 · SHU	4.1 km	MPC · JPL
656463	2016 AZ_{360}	—	January 8, 2016	Haleakala	Pan-STARRS 1	BRG	1.2 km	MPC · JPL
656464	2016 BZ_{1}	—	December 4, 2015	Haleakala	Pan-STARRS 1	·	1.7 km	MPC · JPL
656465	2016 BU_{2}	—	December 9, 2015	Haleakala	Pan-STARRS 1	·	1.3 km	MPC · JPL
656466	2016 BC_{4}	—	November 6, 2015	Mount Lemmon	Mount Lemmon Survey	·	1.5 km	MPC · JPL
656467	2016 BX_{5}	—	October 22, 2003	Kitt Peak	Spacewatch	·	2.0 km	MPC · JPL
656468	2016 BO_{6}	—	January 24, 2007	Mount Lemmon	Mount Lemmon Survey	·	1.4 km	MPC · JPL
656469	2016 BQ_{6}	—	February 27, 2012	Haleakala	Pan-STARRS 1	·	1.6 km	MPC · JPL
656470	2016 BR_{6}	—	February 24, 2012	Haleakala	Pan-STARRS 1	·	1.3 km	MPC · JPL
656471	2016 BX_{12}	—	August 30, 2014	Mount Lemmon	Mount Lemmon Survey	·	1.2 km	MPC · JPL
656472	2016 BK_{14}	—	November 4, 2012	Haleakala	Pan-STARRS 1	H	500 m	MPC · JPL
656473	2016 BD_{18}	—	August 23, 2014	Haleakala	Pan-STARRS 1	·	1.7 km	MPC · JPL
656474	2016 BF_{20}	—	March 20, 2012	Haleakala	Pan-STARRS 1	EUN	1.1 km	MPC · JPL
656475	2016 BL_{20}	—	February 9, 2008	Kitt Peak	Spacewatch	·	860 m	MPC · JPL
656476	2016 BS_{21}	—	August 28, 2014	Haleakala	Pan-STARRS 1	·	1.4 km	MPC · JPL
656477	2016 BK_{24}	—	November 10, 2015	Mount Lemmon	Mount Lemmon Survey	H	520 m	MPC · JPL
656478	2016 BS_{26}	—	September 2, 2010	Mount Lemmon	Mount Lemmon Survey	·	1.0 km	MPC · JPL
656479	2016 BR_{31}	—	February 9, 2008	Kitt Peak	Spacewatch	MAR	730 m	MPC · JPL
656480	2016 BH_{32}	—	October 14, 2014	Mount Lemmon	Mount Lemmon Survey	·	1.5 km	MPC · JPL
656481	2016 BM_{32}	—	February 25, 2012	Catalina	CSS	RAF	710 m	MPC · JPL
656482	2016 BA_{35}	—	September 23, 2008	Kitt Peak	Spacewatch	·	2.6 km	MPC · JPL
656483	2016 BN_{36}	—	October 3, 2006	Mount Lemmon	Mount Lemmon Survey	·	910 m	MPC · JPL
656484	2016 BU_{38}	—	January 8, 2016	Haleakala	Pan-STARRS 1	3:2 · SHU	3.8 km	MPC · JPL
656485	2016 BR_{39}	—	April 18, 2013	Palomar	Palomar Transient Factory	·	1.4 km	MPC · JPL
656486	2016 BE_{40}	—	March 25, 2012	Mount Lemmon	Mount Lemmon Survey	·	1.1 km	MPC · JPL
656487	2016 BA_{42}	—	March 11, 2008	Kitt Peak	Spacewatch	·	1.1 km	MPC · JPL
656488	2016 BY_{42}	—	January 7, 2016	Haleakala	Pan-STARRS 1	NYS	970 m	MPC · JPL
656489	2016 BC_{43}	—	February 9, 2008	Mount Lemmon	Mount Lemmon Survey	·	1 km	MPC · JPL
656490	2016 BF_{43}	—	January 7, 2016	Haleakala	Pan-STARRS 1	·	1.1 km	MPC · JPL
656491	2016 BO_{43}	—	September 18, 2014	Haleakala	Pan-STARRS 1	·	1.5 km	MPC · JPL
656492	2016 BV_{44}	—	January 9, 2016	Haleakala	Pan-STARRS 1	JUN	900 m	MPC · JPL
656493	2016 BB_{46}	—	April 12, 2004	Kitt Peak	Spacewatch	·	1.0 km	MPC · JPL
656494	2016 BJ_{46}	—	March 31, 2012	Mount Lemmon	Mount Lemmon Survey	EUN	930 m	MPC · JPL
656495	2016 BK_{47}	—	February 26, 2012	Mount Lemmon	Mount Lemmon Survey	·	1.2 km	MPC · JPL
656496	2016 BO_{48}	—	March 14, 2012	Mount Lemmon	Mount Lemmon Survey	·	870 m	MPC · JPL
656497	2016 BT_{49}	—	January 3, 2016	Haleakala	Pan-STARRS 1	V	540 m	MPC · JPL
656498	2016 BS_{50}	—	August 27, 2014	Haleakala	Pan-STARRS 1	·	1.2 km	MPC · JPL
656499	2016 BF_{51}	—	January 18, 2008	Kitt Peak	Spacewatch	·	720 m	MPC · JPL
656500	2016 BB_{53}	—	July 28, 2014	Haleakala	Pan-STARRS 1	·	1.2 km	MPC · JPL

== 656501–656600 ==
back to top

Designation			Discovery			Properties		Ref
Permanent	Provisional	Named after	Date	Site	Discoverer(s)	Category	Diam.	Ref
656501	2016 BQ_{53}	—	September 14, 2006	Mauna Kea	J. Masiero, R. Jedicke	NYS	1.0 km	MPC · JPL
656502	2016 BZ_{53}	—	January 30, 2016	Mount Lemmon	Mount Lemmon Survey	·	770 m	MPC · JPL
656503	2016 BA_{64}	—	August 19, 2006	Kitt Peak	Spacewatch	·	990 m	MPC · JPL
656504	2016 BR_{64}	—	June 27, 2014	Haleakala	Pan-STARRS 1	·	900 m	MPC · JPL
656505	2016 BZ_{64}	—	August 24, 2001	Kitt Peak	Spacewatch	·	1.2 km	MPC · JPL
656506	2016 BA_{65}	—	April 13, 2004	Kitt Peak	Spacewatch	·	1.0 km	MPC · JPL
656507	2016 BH_{67}	—	October 31, 2006	Kitt Peak	Spacewatch	·	1 km	MPC · JPL
656508	2016 BT_{68}	—	April 5, 2008	Mount Lemmon	Mount Lemmon Survey	·	1.2 km	MPC · JPL
656509	2016 BH_{70}	—	September 18, 1995	Kitt Peak	Spacewatch	·	1.0 km	MPC · JPL
656510	2016 BH_{72}	—	October 3, 2005	Kitt Peak	Spacewatch	·	1.3 km	MPC · JPL
656511	2016 BW_{76}	—	August 29, 2005	Kitt Peak	Spacewatch	·	1.7 km	MPC · JPL
656512	2016 BX_{79}	—	November 16, 2002	Palomar	NEAT	(5)	1.1 km	MPC · JPL
656513	2016 BG_{80}	—	October 4, 2006	Mount Lemmon	Mount Lemmon Survey	·	970 m	MPC · JPL
656514	2016 BU_{80}	—	March 14, 2011	Mount Lemmon	Mount Lemmon Survey	H	440 m	MPC · JPL
656515	2016 BH_{81}	—	February 12, 2002	Socorro	LINEAR	H	510 m	MPC · JPL
656516	2016 BZ_{81}	—	December 29, 1999	Mauna Kea	Veillet, C.	3:2 · SHU	4.5 km	MPC · JPL
656517	2016 BN_{82}	—	January 17, 2016	Haleakala	Pan-STARRS 1	H	460 m	MPC · JPL
656518	2016 BO_{83}	—	January 14, 2016	Catalina	CSS	H	470 m	MPC · JPL
656519	2016 BV_{85}	—	June 14, 2004	Kitt Peak	Spacewatch	·	1.6 km	MPC · JPL
656520	2016 BK_{86}	—	August 31, 2005	Kitt Peak	Spacewatch	HNS	980 m	MPC · JPL
656521	2016 BH_{88}	—	January 16, 2016	Haleakala	Pan-STARRS 1	EUN	1.0 km	MPC · JPL
656522	2016 BR_{89}	—	January 18, 2016	Haleakala	Pan-STARRS 1	KON	1.6 km	MPC · JPL
656523	2016 BY_{90}	—	February 27, 2012	Haleakala	Pan-STARRS 1	·	1.3 km	MPC · JPL
656524	2016 BK_{91}	—	February 16, 2012	Haleakala	Pan-STARRS 1	EUN	920 m	MPC · JPL
656525	2016 BL_{91}	—	February 4, 2012	Haleakala	Pan-STARRS 1	·	820 m	MPC · JPL
656526	2016 BO_{91}	—	January 18, 2016	Haleakala	Pan-STARRS 1	ADE	1.6 km	MPC · JPL
656527	2016 BS_{91}	—	January 30, 2016	Haleakala	Pan-STARRS 1	EUN	1.1 km	MPC · JPL
656528	2016 BD_{94}	—	September 7, 2008	Mount Lemmon	Mount Lemmon Survey	EOS	1.5 km	MPC · JPL
656529	2016 BJ_{94}	—	January 16, 2016	Haleakala	Pan-STARRS 1	PHO	780 m	MPC · JPL
656530	2016 BS_{95}	—	April 27, 2008	Kitt Peak	Spacewatch	·	1.1 km	MPC · JPL
656531	2016 BW_{95}	—	November 25, 2014	Mount Lemmon	Mount Lemmon Survey	·	1.1 km	MPC · JPL
656532	2016 BJ_{98}	—	October 4, 2014	Mount Lemmon	Mount Lemmon Survey	·	1.5 km	MPC · JPL
656533	2016 BO_{100}	—	January 18, 2016	Haleakala	Pan-STARRS 1	EUN	890 m	MPC · JPL
656534	2016 BA_{101}	—	January 18, 2016	Haleakala	Pan-STARRS 1	EUN	1.1 km	MPC · JPL
656535	2016 BL_{102}	—	January 6, 2012	Haleakala	Pan-STARRS 1	ADE	2.0 km	MPC · JPL
656536	2016 BG_{104}	—	January 30, 2016	Haleakala	Pan-STARRS 1	·	1.5 km	MPC · JPL
656537	2016 BK_{105}	—	August 20, 2014	Haleakala	Pan-STARRS 1	·	1.1 km	MPC · JPL
656538	2016 BL_{105}	—	January 31, 2016	Haleakala	Pan-STARRS 1	·	1.5 km	MPC · JPL
656539	2016 BM_{111}	—	January 29, 2016	Mount Lemmon	Mount Lemmon Survey	·	1.2 km	MPC · JPL
656540	2016 BV_{116}	—	March 6, 2008	Mount Lemmon	Mount Lemmon Survey	RAF	820 m	MPC · JPL
656541	2016 BH_{119}	—	January 30, 2016	Mount Lemmon	Mount Lemmon Survey	·	880 m	MPC · JPL
656542	2016 BA_{125}	—	January 31, 2016	Haleakala	Pan-STARRS 1	·	1.0 km	MPC · JPL
656543	2016 BB_{125}	—	January 16, 2016	Haleakala	Pan-STARRS 1	·	830 m	MPC · JPL
656544	2016 BW_{126}	—	January 31, 2016	Haleakala	Pan-STARRS 1	·	880 m	MPC · JPL
656545	2016 CP	—	January 15, 2016	Haleakala	Pan-STARRS 1	·	890 m	MPC · JPL
656546	2016 CP_{2}	—	October 21, 2014	Mount Lemmon	Mount Lemmon Survey	·	1.3 km	MPC · JPL
656547	2016 CY_{4}	—	January 30, 2016	Mount Lemmon	Mount Lemmon Survey	·	1.4 km	MPC · JPL
656548	2016 CL_{7}	—	March 4, 2012	Mount Lemmon	Mount Lemmon Survey	·	1.6 km	MPC · JPL
656549	2016 CC_{8}	—	January 24, 2007	Mount Lemmon	Mount Lemmon Survey	·	1.3 km	MPC · JPL
656550	2016 CX_{9}	—	February 8, 1995	Kitt Peak	Spacewatch	·	900 m	MPC · JPL
656551	2016 CH_{12}	—	June 17, 2005	Mount Lemmon	Mount Lemmon Survey	·	900 m	MPC · JPL
656552	2016 CC_{13}	—	March 24, 2012	Mount Lemmon	Mount Lemmon Survey	·	1.4 km	MPC · JPL
656553	2016 CS_{14}	—	July 2, 2013	Haleakala	Pan-STARRS 1	·	1.1 km	MPC · JPL
656554	2016 CU_{14}	—	February 25, 2012	Mount Lemmon	Mount Lemmon Survey	·	1.1 km	MPC · JPL
656555	2016 CM_{18}	—	September 17, 2006	Kitt Peak	Spacewatch	·	950 m	MPC · JPL
656556	2016 CQ_{26}	—	March 15, 2012	Mount Lemmon	Mount Lemmon Survey	·	1.2 km	MPC · JPL
656557	2016 CN_{27}	—	February 11, 2008	Mount Lemmon	Mount Lemmon Survey	MAR	1.3 km	MPC · JPL
656558	2016 CG_{28}	—	March 30, 2008	Kitt Peak	Spacewatch	·	1.3 km	MPC · JPL
656559	2016 CJ_{34}	—	March 4, 2008	Mount Lemmon	Mount Lemmon Survey	·	1.1 km	MPC · JPL
656560	2016 CM_{34}	—	November 25, 2006	Kitt Peak	Spacewatch	·	1.7 km	MPC · JPL
656561	2016 CS_{34}	—	January 16, 2016	Haleakala	Pan-STARRS 1	·	1.4 km	MPC · JPL
656562	2016 CN_{38}	—	February 15, 2012	Haleakala	Pan-STARRS 1	·	840 m	MPC · JPL
656563	2016 CV_{40}	—	January 26, 2007	Kitt Peak	Spacewatch	·	1.5 km	MPC · JPL
656564	2016 CA_{41}	—	December 1, 2010	Mount Lemmon	Mount Lemmon Survey	·	1.1 km	MPC · JPL
656565	2016 CC_{41}	—	October 27, 2006	Mount Lemmon	Mount Lemmon Survey	(5)	860 m	MPC · JPL
656566	2016 CJ_{43}	—	January 14, 2016	Haleakala	Pan-STARRS 1	EUN	900 m	MPC · JPL
656567	2016 CV_{44}	—	March 17, 2012	Mount Lemmon	Mount Lemmon Survey	(17392)	1.2 km	MPC · JPL
656568	2016 CQ_{45}	—	August 6, 2014	Haleakala	Pan-STARRS 1	MAR	810 m	MPC · JPL
656569	2016 CS_{45}	—	September 17, 2014	Haleakala	Pan-STARRS 1	·	900 m	MPC · JPL
656570	2016 CF_{49}	—	February 19, 2012	Kitt Peak	Spacewatch	·	880 m	MPC · JPL
656571	2016 CG_{52}	—	March 14, 2007	Mount Lemmon	Mount Lemmon Survey	WIT	790 m	MPC · JPL
656572	2016 CR_{52}	—	January 31, 2016	Haleakala	Pan-STARRS 1	·	770 m	MPC · JPL
656573	2016 CF_{53}	—	April 29, 2008	Mount Lemmon	Mount Lemmon Survey	·	1.2 km	MPC · JPL
656574	2016 CQ_{53}	—	August 23, 2001	Kitt Peak	Spacewatch	·	1.1 km	MPC · JPL
656575	2016 CR_{54}	—	February 3, 2012	Mount Lemmon	Mount Lemmon Survey	·	1.2 km	MPC · JPL
656576	2016 CF_{55}	—	February 3, 2016	Haleakala	Pan-STARRS 1	·	1 km	MPC · JPL
656577	2016 CV_{56}	—	October 28, 2005	Mount Lemmon	Mount Lemmon Survey	·	1.3 km	MPC · JPL
656578	2016 CN_{58}	—	September 27, 1998	Kitt Peak	Spacewatch	RAF	680 m	MPC · JPL
656579	2016 CY_{58}	—	October 22, 2003	Apache Point	SDSS Collaboration	·	3.7 km	MPC · JPL
656580	2016 CS_{59}	—	February 14, 2008	Catalina	CSS	·	1.1 km	MPC · JPL
656581	2016 CO_{62}	—	February 3, 2016	Haleakala	Pan-STARRS 1	·	710 m	MPC · JPL
656582	2016 CB_{64}	—	February 16, 2012	Mayhill-ISON	L. Elenin	·	1.1 km	MPC · JPL
656583	2016 CC_{67}	—	September 10, 2004	Kitt Peak	Spacewatch	·	1.9 km	MPC · JPL
656584	2016 CM_{68}	—	March 27, 2012	Mount Lemmon	Mount Lemmon Survey	·	1.6 km	MPC · JPL
656585	2016 CW_{68}	—	March 8, 2003	Kitt Peak	Deep Lens Survey	·	1.4 km	MPC · JPL
656586	2016 CQ_{70}	—	December 17, 2015	Mount Lemmon	Mount Lemmon Survey	·	1.3 km	MPC · JPL
656587	2016 CH_{71}	—	September 25, 2006	Mount Lemmon	Mount Lemmon Survey	·	970 m	MPC · JPL
656588	2016 CF_{73}	—	February 28, 2012	Haleakala	Pan-STARRS 1	·	1.1 km	MPC · JPL
656589	2016 CM_{78}	—	February 5, 2016	Haleakala	Pan-STARRS 1	·	1.3 km	MPC · JPL
656590	2016 CB_{81}	—	September 20, 2014	Haleakala	Pan-STARRS 1	·	1.9 km	MPC · JPL
656591	2016 CO_{82}	—	January 22, 2012	Haleakala	Pan-STARRS 1	·	1.0 km	MPC · JPL
656592	2016 CJ_{83}	—	February 5, 2016	Haleakala	Pan-STARRS 1	·	1.1 km	MPC · JPL
656593	2016 CT_{84}	—	May 19, 2004	Kitt Peak	Spacewatch	EUN	930 m	MPC · JPL
656594	2016 CT_{86}	—	February 5, 2016	Haleakala	Pan-STARRS 1	·	1.6 km	MPC · JPL
656595	2016 CD_{88}	—	February 3, 2016	Mount Lemmon	Mount Lemmon Survey	·	1.3 km	MPC · JPL
656596	2016 CM_{90}	—	June 17, 2013	Mount Lemmon	Mount Lemmon Survey	·	1.2 km	MPC · JPL
656597	2016 CB_{91}	—	February 5, 2016	Haleakala	Pan-STARRS 1	·	1.7 km	MPC · JPL
656598	2016 CY_{92}	—	October 10, 2010	Mount Lemmon	Mount Lemmon Survey	·	1.2 km	MPC · JPL
656599	2016 CW_{94}	—	October 9, 2005	Kitt Peak	Spacewatch	·	1.4 km	MPC · JPL
656600	2016 CJ_{95}	—	March 3, 2005	Catalina	CSS	·	3.0 km	MPC · JPL

== 656601–656700 ==
back to top

Designation			Discovery			Properties		Ref
Permanent	Provisional	Named after	Date	Site	Discoverer(s)	Category	Diam.	Ref
656601	2016 CW_{115}	—	August 30, 2014	Mount Lemmon	Mount Lemmon Survey	·	1.5 km	MPC · JPL
656602	2016 CQ_{122}	—	July 25, 2014	ESA OGS	ESA OGS	·	830 m	MPC · JPL
656603	2016 CE_{127}	—	August 29, 2005	Kitt Peak	Spacewatch	EUN	920 m	MPC · JPL
656604	2016 CN_{130}	—	January 20, 2012	Haleakala	Pan-STARRS 1	MAR	1 km	MPC · JPL
656605	2016 CA_{132}	—	January 15, 2007	Mauna Kea	P. A. Wiegert	(5)	890 m	MPC · JPL
656606	2016 CH_{132}	—	February 6, 2007	Mount Lemmon	Mount Lemmon Survey	·	1.4 km	MPC · JPL
656607	2016 CN_{133}	—	February 3, 2008	Kitt Peak	Spacewatch	·	1.4 km	MPC · JPL
656608	2016 CB_{134}	—	December 21, 2006	Mount Lemmon	Mount Lemmon Survey	·	1.1 km	MPC · JPL
656609	2016 CD_{143}	—	July 14, 2013	Haleakala	Pan-STARRS 1	·	1.5 km	MPC · JPL
656610	2016 CM_{143}	—	August 14, 2013	Haleakala	Pan-STARRS 1	·	1.4 km	MPC · JPL
656611	2016 CQ_{145}	—	February 27, 2008	Mount Lemmon	Mount Lemmon Survey	·	1.0 km	MPC · JPL
656612	2016 CA_{147}	—	January 24, 2007	Mount Lemmon	Mount Lemmon Survey	·	1.6 km	MPC · JPL
656613	2016 CS_{147}	—	August 10, 2007	Kitt Peak	Spacewatch	(2076)	850 m	MPC · JPL
656614	2016 CV_{147}	—	January 9, 2016	Haleakala	Pan-STARRS 1	·	1.5 km	MPC · JPL
656615	2016 CX_{148}	—	September 10, 2010	Kitt Peak	Spacewatch	·	940 m	MPC · JPL
656616	2016 CH_{149}	—	April 27, 2008	Kitt Peak	Spacewatch	·	1.4 km	MPC · JPL
656617	2016 CT_{149}	—	August 30, 2005	Kitt Peak	Spacewatch	·	1.2 km	MPC · JPL
656618	2016 CZ_{151}	—	December 30, 2007	Kitt Peak	Spacewatch	3:2	3.8 km	MPC · JPL
656619	2016 CS_{155}	—	July 27, 2009	Kitt Peak	Spacewatch	·	1.6 km	MPC · JPL
656620	2016 CY_{155}	—	February 10, 2008	Kitt Peak	Spacewatch	·	1.1 km	MPC · JPL
656621	2016 CD_{156}	—	October 11, 2005	Kitt Peak	Spacewatch	·	1.4 km	MPC · JPL
656622	2016 CG_{179}	—	October 3, 2014	Mount Lemmon	Mount Lemmon Survey	EOS	1.4 km	MPC · JPL
656623	2016 CE_{182}	—	February 5, 2016	Mount Lemmon	Mount Lemmon Survey	·	1.2 km	MPC · JPL
656624	2016 CN_{182}	—	October 26, 2005	Kitt Peak	Spacewatch	·	1.7 km	MPC · JPL
656625	2016 CR_{186}	—	November 2, 2010	Mount Lemmon	Mount Lemmon Survey	·	1.2 km	MPC · JPL
656626	2016 CC_{187}	—	February 9, 2016	Haleakala	Pan-STARRS 1	MAR	790 m	MPC · JPL
656627	2016 CG_{188}	—	February 27, 2012	Haleakala	Pan-STARRS 1	·	1.2 km	MPC · JPL
656628	2016 CW_{188}	—	March 30, 2003	Kitt Peak	Spacewatch	EUN	1.2 km	MPC · JPL
656629	2016 CR_{189}	—	September 15, 2009	Kitt Peak	Spacewatch	526	2.0 km	MPC · JPL
656630	2016 CG_{193}	—	February 10, 2016	Haleakala	Pan-STARRS 1	H	390 m	MPC · JPL
656631	2016 CA_{195}	—	February 12, 2016	Haleakala	Pan-STARRS 1	·	850 m	MPC · JPL
656632	2016 CU_{196}	—	March 5, 2008	Mount Lemmon	Mount Lemmon Survey	·	920 m	MPC · JPL
656633	2016 CH_{197}	—	December 9, 2015	Haleakala	Pan-STARRS 1	·	1.1 km	MPC · JPL
656634	2016 CL_{197}	—	October 31, 2010	Mount Lemmon	Mount Lemmon Survey	·	1.3 km	MPC · JPL
656635	2016 CA_{199}	—	February 8, 2016	Mount Lemmon	Mount Lemmon Survey	·	1.4 km	MPC · JPL
656636	2016 CL_{201}	—	August 20, 2014	Haleakala	Pan-STARRS 1	·	770 m	MPC · JPL
656637	2016 CC_{202}	—	February 24, 2006	Kitt Peak	Spacewatch	·	1.7 km	MPC · JPL
656638	2016 CR_{204}	—	January 17, 2016	Haleakala	Pan-STARRS 1	MAR	610 m	MPC · JPL
656639	2016 CY_{205}	—	March 2, 2008	Kitt Peak	Spacewatch	·	920 m	MPC · JPL
656640	2016 CY_{206}	—	January 17, 2016	Haleakala	Pan-STARRS 1	·	980 m	MPC · JPL
656641	2016 CZ_{207}	—	October 24, 2005	Kitt Peak	Spacewatch	3:2	5.4 km	MPC · JPL
656642	2016 CD_{213}	—	April 26, 2008	Mount Lemmon	Mount Lemmon Survey	·	1.1 km	MPC · JPL
656643	2016 CF_{213}	—	August 16, 2009	Kitt Peak	Spacewatch	EUN	1.2 km	MPC · JPL
656644	2016 CU_{217}	—	February 4, 2016	Haleakala	Pan-STARRS 1	·	1.0 km	MPC · JPL
656645	2016 CP_{218}	—	February 28, 2012	Haleakala	Pan-STARRS 1	·	1.4 km	MPC · JPL
656646	2016 CE_{219}	—	November 1, 2010	Mount Lemmon	Mount Lemmon Survey	·	770 m	MPC · JPL
656647	2016 CC_{223}	—	February 10, 2008	Kitt Peak	Spacewatch	·	920 m	MPC · JPL
656648	2016 CO_{223}	—	March 4, 2008	Mount Lemmon	Mount Lemmon Survey	KON	1.7 km	MPC · JPL
656649	2016 CQ_{234}	—	January 3, 2016	Haleakala	Pan-STARRS 1	·	1.4 km	MPC · JPL
656650	2016 CK_{238}	—	November 1, 2006	Mount Lemmon	Mount Lemmon Survey	·	1.0 km	MPC · JPL
656651	2016 CX_{240}	—	November 24, 2014	Haleakala	Pan-STARRS 1	·	1.4 km	MPC · JPL
656652	2016 CL_{245}	—	March 27, 2008	Kitt Peak	Spacewatch	EUN	1.1 km	MPC · JPL
656653	2016 CY_{245}	—	February 10, 2016	Haleakala	Pan-STARRS 1	EUN	970 m	MPC · JPL
656654	2016 CS_{248}	—	January 7, 2016	Haleakala	Pan-STARRS 1	·	3.2 km	MPC · JPL
656655	2016 CZ_{248}	—	June 27, 2001	Palomar	NEAT	EUP	3.8 km	MPC · JPL
656656	2016 CW_{254}	—	February 10, 2016	Haleakala	Pan-STARRS 1	·	1.4 km	MPC · JPL
656657	2016 CT_{255}	—	December 8, 2015	Haleakala	Pan-STARRS 1	·	1.5 km	MPC · JPL
656658	2016 CW_{255}	—	August 31, 2005	Kitt Peak	Spacewatch	HNS	1.1 km	MPC · JPL
656659	2016 CF_{258}	—	March 6, 2008	Mount Lemmon	Mount Lemmon Survey	KON	2.1 km	MPC · JPL
656660	2016 CZ_{259}	—	September 27, 2009	Kitt Peak	Spacewatch	HNS	1.2 km	MPC · JPL
656661	2016 CF_{262}	—	January 6, 2012	Haleakala	Pan-STARRS 1	·	1.4 km	MPC · JPL
656662	2016 CJ_{262}	—	March 12, 2011	Mount Lemmon	Mount Lemmon Survey	·	3.4 km	MPC · JPL
656663	2016 CH_{263}	—	December 5, 2007	Kitt Peak	Spacewatch	·	1.5 km	MPC · JPL
656664	2016 CC_{266}	—	February 5, 2016	Haleakala	Pan-STARRS 1	3:2	4.0 km	MPC · JPL
656665	2016 CH_{266}	—	March 2, 2008	Mount Lemmon	Mount Lemmon Survey	H	430 m	MPC · JPL
656666	2016 CT_{266}	—	February 2, 2016	Haleakala	Pan-STARRS 1	·	970 m	MPC · JPL
656667	2016 CG_{275}	—	February 10, 2016	Haleakala	Pan-STARRS 1	·	1.1 km	MPC · JPL
656668	2016 CL_{276}	—	February 11, 2016	Haleakala	Pan-STARRS 1	EUN	970 m	MPC · JPL
656669	2016 CT_{276}	—	February 11, 2016	Haleakala	Pan-STARRS 1	·	2.0 km	MPC · JPL
656670	2016 CA_{277}	—	February 11, 2016	Haleakala	Pan-STARRS 1	·	1.4 km	MPC · JPL
656671	2016 CK_{279}	—	February 4, 2016	Haleakala	Pan-STARRS 1	·	1.6 km	MPC · JPL
656672	2016 CT_{279}	—	April 1, 2012	Haleakala	Pan-STARRS 1	EUN	1.1 km	MPC · JPL
656673	2016 CZ_{279}	—	March 24, 2012	Mount Lemmon	Mount Lemmon Survey	·	1.4 km	MPC · JPL
656674	2016 CZ_{280}	—	November 6, 2010	Kitt Peak	Spacewatch	·	1.2 km	MPC · JPL
656675	2016 CA_{281}	—	March 17, 2012	Mount Lemmon	Mount Lemmon Survey	·	940 m	MPC · JPL
656676	2016 CH_{281}	—	February 17, 2007	Mount Lemmon	Mount Lemmon Survey	EUN	870 m	MPC · JPL
656677	2016 CJ_{281}	—	April 15, 2012	Haleakala	Pan-STARRS 1	MRX	800 m	MPC · JPL
656678	2016 CR_{281}	—	March 10, 2007	Mount Lemmon	Mount Lemmon Survey	·	1.6 km	MPC · JPL
656679	2016 CV_{281}	—	January 10, 2007	Mount Lemmon	Mount Lemmon Survey	·	1.1 km	MPC · JPL
656680	2016 CC_{283}	—	September 9, 2013	Haleakala	Pan-STARRS 1	KOR	1.3 km	MPC · JPL
656681	2016 CH_{283}	—	January 30, 2011	Mount Lemmon	Mount Lemmon Survey	·	1.6 km	MPC · JPL
656682	2016 CN_{284}	—	February 28, 2008	Mount Lemmon	Mount Lemmon Survey	·	650 m	MPC · JPL
656683	2016 CP_{284}	—	February 2, 2016	Haleakala	Pan-STARRS 1	RAF	590 m	MPC · JPL
656684	2016 CQ_{284}	—	November 18, 2006	Kitt Peak	Spacewatch	·	960 m	MPC · JPL
656685	2016 CS_{284}	—	February 3, 2016	Haleakala	Pan-STARRS 1	MAR	860 m	MPC · JPL
656686	2016 CU_{284}	—	October 28, 2010	Mount Lemmon	Mount Lemmon Survey	·	840 m	MPC · JPL
656687	2016 CE_{285}	—	October 21, 2014	Mount Lemmon	Mount Lemmon Survey	·	970 m	MPC · JPL
656688	2016 CG_{285}	—	September 20, 2014	Haleakala	Pan-STARRS 1	EUN	690 m	MPC · JPL
656689	2016 CH_{285}	—	January 19, 2012	Haleakala	Pan-STARRS 1	·	890 m	MPC · JPL
656690	2016 CU_{285}	—	March 1, 2012	Mount Lemmon	Mount Lemmon Survey	·	960 m	MPC · JPL
656691	2016 CE_{286}	—	May 29, 2012	Bergisch Gladbach	W. Bickel	·	1.5 km	MPC · JPL
656692	2016 CV_{287}	—	February 9, 2016	Haleakala	Pan-STARRS 1	·	1.7 km	MPC · JPL
656693	2016 CP_{289}	—	September 3, 2013	Mount Lemmon	Mount Lemmon Survey	·	1.7 km	MPC · JPL
656694	2016 CC_{291}	—	April 3, 2008	Mount Lemmon	Mount Lemmon Survey	·	1 km	MPC · JPL
656695	2016 CR_{291}	—	February 8, 2016	Mount Lemmon	Mount Lemmon Survey	·	1.4 km	MPC · JPL
656696	2016 CE_{293}	—	October 22, 2003	Kitt Peak	Spacewatch	·	2.2 km	MPC · JPL
656697	2016 CO_{293}	—	February 6, 2016	Haleakala	Pan-STARRS 1	ADE	1.5 km	MPC · JPL
656698	2016 CK_{294}	—	January 27, 2015	Haleakala	Pan-STARRS 1	·	1.9 km	MPC · JPL
656699	2016 CN_{294}	—	February 11, 2016	Haleakala	Pan-STARRS 1	HNS	860 m	MPC · JPL
656700	2016 CM_{295}	—	February 2, 2016	Haleakala	Pan-STARRS 1	·	1.1 km	MPC · JPL

== 656701–656800 ==
back to top

Designation			Discovery			Properties		Ref
Permanent	Provisional	Named after	Date	Site	Discoverer(s)	Category	Diam.	Ref
656701	2016 CV_{296}	—	February 3, 2016	Haleakala	Pan-STARRS 1	·	1.1 km	MPC · JPL
656702	2016 CZ_{298}	—	October 17, 2010	Mount Lemmon	Mount Lemmon Survey	·	1.1 km	MPC · JPL
656703	2016 CY_{299}	—	February 4, 2016	Haleakala	Pan-STARRS 1	·	970 m	MPC · JPL
656704	2016 CW_{300}	—	November 17, 2014	Haleakala	Pan-STARRS 1	NEM	1.6 km	MPC · JPL
656705	2016 CL_{303}	—	February 5, 2016	Haleakala	Pan-STARRS 1	GEF	1.1 km	MPC · JPL
656706	2016 CA_{305}	—	January 17, 2007	Kitt Peak	Spacewatch	·	1.3 km	MPC · JPL
656707	2016 CQ_{306}	—	September 18, 2014	Haleakala	Pan-STARRS 1	·	900 m	MPC · JPL
656708	2016 CT_{306}	—	February 6, 2016	Haleakala	Pan-STARRS 1	·	1.4 km	MPC · JPL
656709	2016 CA_{307}	—	April 11, 2008	Kitt Peak	Spacewatch	·	1.1 km	MPC · JPL
656710	2016 CP_{311}	—	September 19, 2014	Haleakala	Pan-STARRS 1	·	1.1 km	MPC · JPL
656711	2016 CZ_{311}	—	January 12, 2011	Mount Lemmon	Mount Lemmon Survey	·	1.4 km	MPC · JPL
656712	2016 CL_{312}	—	November 8, 2010	Kitt Peak	Spacewatch	·	1.2 km	MPC · JPL
656713	2016 CA_{313}	—	April 7, 2008	Kitt Peak	Spacewatch	·	910 m	MPC · JPL
656714	2016 CE_{313}	—	February 27, 2012	Haleakala	Pan-STARRS 1	·	1.1 km	MPC · JPL
656715	2016 CP_{315}	—	February 23, 2012	Mount Lemmon	Mount Lemmon Survey	·	870 m	MPC · JPL
656716	2016 CL_{316}	—	March 11, 2007	Mount Lemmon	Mount Lemmon Survey	·	1.3 km	MPC · JPL
656717	2016 CU_{317}	—	October 28, 2008	Kitt Peak	Spacewatch	·	2.7 km	MPC · JPL
656718	2016 CG_{318}	—	February 9, 2007	Catalina	CSS	·	1.2 km	MPC · JPL
656719	2016 CZ_{319}	—	October 21, 2014	Mount Lemmon	Mount Lemmon Survey	·	1.4 km	MPC · JPL
656720	2016 CB_{321}	—	August 14, 2013	Haleakala	Pan-STARRS 1	·	1.5 km	MPC · JPL
656721	2016 CL_{321}	—	February 12, 2016	Haleakala	Pan-STARRS 1	·	1.2 km	MPC · JPL
656722	2016 CR_{323}	—	February 5, 2016	Haleakala	Pan-STARRS 1	·	1.1 km	MPC · JPL
656723	2016 CE_{326}	—	March 21, 2009	Mount Lemmon	Mount Lemmon Survey	3:2 · SHU	4.0 km	MPC · JPL
656724	2016 CN_{327}	—	February 3, 2016	Haleakala	Pan-STARRS 1	BAR	1.0 km	MPC · JPL
656725	2016 CN_{337}	—	February 4, 2016	Haleakala	Pan-STARRS 1	(5)	760 m	MPC · JPL
656726	2016 CT_{340}	—	February 3, 2016	Haleakala	Pan-STARRS 1	·	1.3 km	MPC · JPL
656727	2016 CK_{341}	—	February 12, 2016	Haleakala	Pan-STARRS 1	·	1.0 km	MPC · JPL
656728	2016 CW_{345}	—	February 5, 2016	Haleakala	Pan-STARRS 1	·	1.6 km	MPC · JPL
656729	2016 CV_{350}	—	February 9, 2016	Haleakala	Pan-STARRS 1	·	1.2 km	MPC · JPL
656730	2016 CG_{351}	—	February 11, 2016	Haleakala	Pan-STARRS 1	BRA	1.2 km	MPC · JPL
656731	2016 CO_{351}	—	October 28, 2014	Mount Lemmon	Mount Lemmon Survey	·	960 m	MPC · JPL
656732	2016 CZ_{359}	—	February 4, 2016	Haleakala	Pan-STARRS 1	·	1.3 km	MPC · JPL
656733	2016 CD_{368}	—	February 3, 2016	Haleakala	Pan-STARRS 1	·	1.5 km	MPC · JPL
656734	2016 CA_{372}	—	February 3, 2016	Haleakala	Pan-STARRS 1	·	1.4 km	MPC · JPL
656735	2016 CK_{372}	—	February 12, 2016	Haleakala	Pan-STARRS 1	HNS	910 m	MPC · JPL
656736	2016 CF_{376}	—	February 11, 2016	Kitt Peak	Spacewatch	·	1.4 km	MPC · JPL
656737	2016 CN_{380}	—	May 28, 2012	Mount Lemmon	Mount Lemmon Survey	·	1.9 km	MPC · JPL
656738	2016 CR_{380}	—	February 5, 2016	Haleakala	Pan-STARRS 1	·	1.4 km	MPC · JPL
656739	2016 CC_{382}	—	February 1, 2016	Haleakala	Pan-STARRS 1	·	1.3 km	MPC · JPL
656740	2016 CN_{412}	—	February 9, 2016	Haleakala	Pan-STARRS 1	·	1.6 km	MPC · JPL
656741	2016 DZ_{3}	—	November 17, 2014	Mount Lemmon	Mount Lemmon Survey	·	1.3 km	MPC · JPL
656742	2016 DR_{4}	—	October 17, 2010	Mount Lemmon	Mount Lemmon Survey	·	1.1 km	MPC · JPL
656743	2016 DZ_{4}	—	January 11, 2008	Mount Lemmon	Mount Lemmon Survey	3:2	4.8 km	MPC · JPL
656744	2016 DQ_{5}	—	February 9, 2016	Haleakala	Pan-STARRS 1	·	1.4 km	MPC · JPL
656745	2016 DY_{8}	—	January 14, 2016	Haleakala	Pan-STARRS 1	·	1.2 km	MPC · JPL
656746	2016 DZ_{13}	—	April 13, 2004	Palomar	NEAT	KON	2.9 km	MPC · JPL
656747	2016 DB_{15}	—	February 27, 2012	Haleakala	Pan-STARRS 1	·	950 m	MPC · JPL
656748	2016 DJ_{17}	—	September 29, 2001	Palomar	NEAT	H	460 m	MPC · JPL
656749	2016 DG_{18}	—	November 1, 2010	Mount Lemmon	Mount Lemmon Survey	EUN	920 m	MPC · JPL
656750	2016 DG_{22}	—	February 22, 2012	Kitt Peak	Spacewatch	·	910 m	MPC · JPL
656751	2016 DS_{24}	—	August 22, 2014	Haleakala	Pan-STARRS 1	·	1.5 km	MPC · JPL
656752	2016 DH_{26}	—	July 16, 2013	Haleakala	Pan-STARRS 1	MAR	1.0 km	MPC · JPL
656753	2016 DJ_{33}	—	February 28, 2016	Kitt Peak	Spacewatch	·	1.3 km	MPC · JPL
656754	2016 DR_{34}	—	February 28, 2016	Haleakala	Pan-STARRS 1	·	2.1 km	MPC · JPL
656755	2016 DD_{35}	—	October 5, 2013	Mount Lemmon	Mount Lemmon Survey	·	1.6 km	MPC · JPL
656756	2016 DO_{35}	—	February 29, 2016	Haleakala	Pan-STARRS 1	·	2.2 km	MPC · JPL
656757	2016 DV_{37}	—	February 18, 2016	Mount Lemmon	Mount Lemmon Survey	·	800 m	MPC · JPL
656758	2016 DF_{39}	—	February 28, 2016	Mount Lemmon	Mount Lemmon Survey	·	1.2 km	MPC · JPL
656759	2016 DV_{40}	—	February 18, 2016	Mount Lemmon	Mount Lemmon Survey	·	940 m	MPC · JPL
656760	2016 DZ_{41}	—	June 18, 2013	Haleakala	Pan-STARRS 1	·	1.3 km	MPC · JPL
656761	2016 EP_{3}	—	October 24, 2014	Mount Lemmon	Mount Lemmon Survey	·	850 m	MPC · JPL
656762	2016 ED_{4}	—	February 12, 2016	Haleakala	Pan-STARRS 1	H	370 m	MPC · JPL
656763	2016 EK_{8}	—	December 4, 2010	Mount Lemmon	Mount Lemmon Survey	·	1.2 km	MPC · JPL
656764	2016 EQ_{8}	—	March 3, 2016	Mount Lemmon	Mount Lemmon Survey	·	1.6 km	MPC · JPL
656765	2016 EJ_{12}	—	March 3, 2016	Haleakala	Pan-STARRS 1	·	1.5 km	MPC · JPL
656766	2016 ES_{12}	—	April 7, 2008	Kitt Peak	Spacewatch	MAR	800 m	MPC · JPL
656767	2016 ET_{12}	—	February 3, 2016	Haleakala	Pan-STARRS 1	MAR	810 m	MPC · JPL
656768	2016 EO_{13}	—	October 15, 2001	Palomar	NEAT	EUN	1.2 km	MPC · JPL
656769	2016 EQ_{13}	—	March 3, 2016	Haleakala	Pan-STARRS 1	·	1.2 km	MPC · JPL
656770	2016 EH_{16}	—	January 8, 2016	Haleakala	Pan-STARRS 1	·	1.3 km	MPC · JPL
656771	2016 EW_{17}	—	December 15, 2010	Mount Lemmon	Mount Lemmon Survey	EUN	1.0 km	MPC · JPL
656772	2016 EX_{17}	—	March 3, 2016	Haleakala	Pan-STARRS 1	HNS	700 m	MPC · JPL
656773	2016 EH_{18}	—	April 24, 2007	Kitt Peak	Spacewatch	·	2.4 km	MPC · JPL
656774	2016 EM_{18}	—	April 29, 2008	Kitt Peak	Spacewatch	·	1.4 km	MPC · JPL
656775	2016 ED_{19}	—	January 14, 2011	Mount Lemmon	Mount Lemmon Survey	·	1.4 km	MPC · JPL
656776	2016 EU_{20}	—	December 14, 2010	Mount Lemmon	Mount Lemmon Survey	·	1.4 km	MPC · JPL
656777	2016 EO_{22}	—	May 29, 2012	Mount Lemmon	Mount Lemmon Survey	·	2.0 km	MPC · JPL
656778	2016 EV_{22}	—	December 21, 2014	Haleakala	Pan-STARRS 1	·	2.3 km	MPC · JPL
656779	2016 EC_{24}	—	December 4, 2005	Catalina	CSS	·	1.8 km	MPC · JPL
656780	2016 ET_{24}	—	February 12, 2016	Haleakala	Pan-STARRS 1	·	1.0 km	MPC · JPL
656781	2016 EE_{25}	—	March 3, 2016	Haleakala	Pan-STARRS 1	EUN	920 m	MPC · JPL
656782	2016 EA_{31}	—	April 11, 2008	Kitt Peak	Spacewatch	·	1.2 km	MPC · JPL
656783	2016 EB_{31}	—	May 15, 2008	Mount Lemmon	Mount Lemmon Survey	·	1.3 km	MPC · JPL
656784	2016 EJ_{33}	—	March 30, 2008	Kitt Peak	Spacewatch	·	1.3 km	MPC · JPL
656785	2016 EV_{36}	—	March 3, 2016	Haleakala	Pan-STARRS 1	·	540 m	MPC · JPL
656786	2016 EF_{37}	—	November 22, 2014	Haleakala	Pan-STARRS 1	·	2.2 km	MPC · JPL
656787	2016 EY_{37}	—	February 10, 2016	Haleakala	Pan-STARRS 1	·	1.4 km	MPC · JPL
656788	2016 EQ_{38}	—	February 2, 2016	Haleakala	Pan-STARRS 1	·	860 m	MPC · JPL
656789	2016 EF_{42}	—	September 28, 2014	Haleakala	Pan-STARRS 1	·	1.2 km	MPC · JPL
656790	2016 EK_{42}	—	January 16, 2016	Haleakala	Pan-STARRS 1	ADE	1.7 km	MPC · JPL
656791	2016 EB_{43}	—	March 27, 2012	Mount Lemmon	Mount Lemmon Survey	·	1.3 km	MPC · JPL
656792	2016 EG_{44}	—	March 30, 2012	Mount Lemmon	Mount Lemmon Survey	·	1.2 km	MPC · JPL
656793	2016 ER_{45}	—	April 4, 2008	Kitt Peak	Spacewatch	MAR	980 m	MPC · JPL
656794	2016 ES_{50}	—	February 10, 2007	Catalina	CSS	JUN	860 m	MPC · JPL
656795	2016 EZ_{51}	—	February 5, 2011	Haleakala	Pan-STARRS 1	·	1.5 km	MPC · JPL
656796	2016 EO_{52}	—	March 4, 2016	Haleakala	Pan-STARRS 1	HNS	840 m	MPC · JPL
656797	2016 EW_{52}	—	December 14, 2010	Mount Lemmon	Mount Lemmon Survey	·	1.6 km	MPC · JPL
656798	2016 ED_{53}	—	February 12, 2016	Haleakala	Pan-STARRS 1	·	1.4 km	MPC · JPL
656799	2016 ED_{60}	—	February 12, 2016	Mount Lemmon	Mount Lemmon Survey	TIR	2.8 km	MPC · JPL
656800	2016 ES_{66}	—	May 28, 2008	Mount Lemmon	Mount Lemmon Survey	·	1.3 km	MPC · JPL

== 656801–656900 ==
back to top

Designation			Discovery			Properties		Ref
Permanent	Provisional	Named after	Date	Site	Discoverer(s)	Category	Diam.	Ref
656801	2016 EV_{69}	—	November 23, 2006	Mount Lemmon	Mount Lemmon Survey	·	1.1 km	MPC · JPL
656802	2016 ES_{72}	—	August 22, 2006	Palomar	NEAT	H	570 m	MPC · JPL
656803	2016 EU_{72}	—	March 1, 2012	Mount Lemmon	Mount Lemmon Survey	·	920 m	MPC · JPL
656804	2016 EM_{73}	—	March 15, 2012	Kitt Peak	Spacewatch	·	900 m	MPC · JPL
656805	2016 EB_{74}	—	May 21, 1999	Kitt Peak	Spacewatch	·	1.5 km	MPC · JPL
656806	2016 EG_{74}	—	February 9, 2016	Haleakala	Pan-STARRS 1	·	1.4 km	MPC · JPL
656807	2016 EA_{75}	—	February 27, 2012	Haleakala	Pan-STARRS 1	·	800 m	MPC · JPL
656808	2016 EN_{77}	—	March 29, 2008	Kitt Peak	Spacewatch	·	1.1 km	MPC · JPL
656809	2016 EQ_{77}	—	January 28, 2007	Mount Lemmon	Mount Lemmon Survey	·	1.3 km	MPC · JPL
656810	2016 EL_{78}	—	February 27, 2016	Haleakala	Pan-STARRS 1	H	400 m	MPC · JPL
656811	2016 EQ_{79}	—	January 21, 2013	Haleakala	Pan-STARRS 1	H	530 m	MPC · JPL
656812	2016 ES_{80}	—	September 9, 2013	Haleakala	Pan-STARRS 1	·	1.8 km	MPC · JPL
656813	2016 EJ_{81}	—	March 10, 2008	Mount Lemmon	Mount Lemmon Survey	·	1.0 km	MPC · JPL
656814	2016 EH_{82}	—	November 22, 2006	Mount Lemmon	Mount Lemmon Survey	·	960 m	MPC · JPL
656815	2016 EV_{86}	—	September 20, 2006	Kitt Peak	Spacewatch	·	1.1 km	MPC · JPL
656816	2016 EX_{87}	—	March 6, 2016	Haleakala	Pan-STARRS 1	·	1.3 km	MPC · JPL
656817	2016 EH_{94}	—	November 2, 2010	Mount Lemmon	Mount Lemmon Survey	·	860 m	MPC · JPL
656818	2016 EN_{96}	—	October 18, 2009	Mount Lemmon	Mount Lemmon Survey	·	1.6 km	MPC · JPL
656819	2016 EZ_{100}	—	October 30, 2010	Mount Lemmon	Mount Lemmon Survey	EUN	820 m	MPC · JPL
656820	2016 EC_{101}	—	March 29, 2012	Kitt Peak	Spacewatch	·	1.2 km	MPC · JPL
656821	2016 EK_{103}	—	February 4, 2016	Haleakala	Pan-STARRS 1	MAR	1.3 km	MPC · JPL
656822	2016 EN_{108}	—	February 21, 2007	Kitt Peak	Spacewatch	·	1.6 km	MPC · JPL
656823	2016 EP_{110}	—	November 13, 2010	Mount Lemmon	Mount Lemmon Survey	·	1.0 km	MPC · JPL
656824	2016 EA_{111}	—	April 19, 2012	Kitt Peak	Spacewatch	·	1.1 km	MPC · JPL
656825	2016 ED_{116}	—	October 2, 2014	Haleakala	Pan-STARRS 1	·	1.1 km	MPC · JPL
656826	2016 EE_{116}	—	January 19, 2012	Haleakala	Pan-STARRS 1	PHO	880 m	MPC · JPL
656827	2016 EJ_{117}	—	September 3, 2010	Mount Lemmon	Mount Lemmon Survey	·	1.7 km	MPC · JPL
656828	2016 ER_{117}	—	April 7, 2008	Kitt Peak	Spacewatch	·	1.0 km	MPC · JPL
656829	2016 EW_{121}	—	March 26, 2003	Kitt Peak	Spacewatch	·	1.4 km	MPC · JPL
656830	2016 ES_{122}	—	November 4, 2014	Mount Lemmon	Mount Lemmon Survey	·	1.5 km	MPC · JPL
656831	2016 EX_{126}	—	September 27, 2005	Kitt Peak	Spacewatch	(7744)	1.3 km	MPC · JPL
656832	2016 ES_{128}	—	September 12, 2009	Kitt Peak	Spacewatch	·	1.3 km	MPC · JPL
656833	2016 EL_{131}	—	January 10, 2007	Kitt Peak	Spacewatch	·	1.1 km	MPC · JPL
656834	2016 ES_{131}	—	June 15, 2013	Mount Lemmon	Mount Lemmon Survey	BRA	1.2 km	MPC · JPL
656835	2016 EF_{132}	—	October 12, 2010	Mount Lemmon	Mount Lemmon Survey	(5)	840 m	MPC · JPL
656836	2016 EN_{135}	—	March 1, 2016	Haleakala	Pan-STARRS 1	·	2.6 km	MPC · JPL
656837	2016 ED_{137}	—	September 15, 2006	Kitt Peak	Spacewatch	·	3.0 km	MPC · JPL
656838	2016 EO_{137}	—	February 23, 2012	Mount Lemmon	Mount Lemmon Survey	·	890 m	MPC · JPL
656839	2016 EZ_{144}	—	March 10, 2016	Haleakala	Pan-STARRS 1	MAR	800 m	MPC · JPL
656840	2016 EB_{148}	—	November 25, 2000	Kitt Peak	Spacewatch	·	1.8 km	MPC · JPL
656841 Uza	2016 EE_{160}	Uza	August 4, 2014	La Palma	EURONEAR	·	1.4 km	MPC · JPL
656842	2016 EC_{161}	—	December 8, 2010	Kitt Peak	Spacewatch	·	1.1 km	MPC · JPL
656843	2016 EB_{163}	—	October 6, 2005	Mount Lemmon	Mount Lemmon Survey	·	1.5 km	MPC · JPL
656844	2016 EM_{166}	—	January 28, 2007	Kitt Peak	Spacewatch	·	1.6 km	MPC · JPL
656845	2016 EW_{166}	—	February 24, 2006	Kitt Peak	Spacewatch	·	1.7 km	MPC · JPL
656846	2016 EA_{167}	—	October 1, 2014	Haleakala	Pan-STARRS 1	·	1.3 km	MPC · JPL
656847	2016 EH_{168}	—	January 10, 2007	Kitt Peak	Spacewatch	·	1.1 km	MPC · JPL
656848	2016 EG_{169}	—	November 29, 2014	Mount Lemmon	Mount Lemmon Survey	AGN	850 m	MPC · JPL
656849	2016 EP_{170}	—	November 7, 2005	Mauna Kea	A. Boattini	·	700 m	MPC · JPL
656850	2016 ES_{171}	—	November 25, 2010	Mount Lemmon	Mount Lemmon Survey	·	980 m	MPC · JPL
656851	2016 EH_{173}	—	November 24, 2002	Palomar	NEAT	·	4.1 km	MPC · JPL
656852	2016 EB_{174}	—	March 14, 2012	Haleakala	Pan-STARRS 1	(194)	1.3 km	MPC · JPL
656853	2016 EM_{175}	—	January 17, 2016	Haleakala	Pan-STARRS 1	·	1.0 km	MPC · JPL
656854	2016 EZ_{176}	—	January 27, 2007	Kitt Peak	Spacewatch	·	900 m	MPC · JPL
656855	2016 EF_{177}	—	November 10, 2010	Mount Lemmon	Mount Lemmon Survey	(5)	860 m	MPC · JPL
656856	2016 EE_{178}	—	August 14, 2013	Haleakala	Pan-STARRS 1	·	1.8 km	MPC · JPL
656857	2016 EK_{178}	—	October 28, 2014	Haleakala	Pan-STARRS 1	EUN	700 m	MPC · JPL
656858	2016 ED_{179}	—	October 5, 2013	Mount Lemmon	Mount Lemmon Survey	KOR	1.2 km	MPC · JPL
656859	2016 EL_{179}	—	September 27, 2011	Ka-Dar	Gerke, V.	·	1.1 km	MPC · JPL
656860	2016 ET_{181}	—	February 29, 2004	Kitt Peak	Spacewatch	·	960 m	MPC · JPL
656861	2016 EE_{183}	—	April 24, 2012	Haleakala	Pan-STARRS 1	·	1.4 km	MPC · JPL
656862	2016 EZ_{183}	—	April 25, 2012	Mount Lemmon	Mount Lemmon Survey	·	1.5 km	MPC · JPL
656863	2016 EB_{184}	—	March 12, 2016	Haleakala	Pan-STARRS 1	·	1.4 km	MPC · JPL
656864	2016 ER_{186}	—	October 19, 2010	Mount Lemmon	Mount Lemmon Survey	JUN	800 m	MPC · JPL
656865	2016 EV_{186}	—	November 4, 2005	Kitt Peak	Spacewatch	·	1.4 km	MPC · JPL
656866	2016 EF_{187}	—	December 2, 2010	Mount Lemmon	Mount Lemmon Survey	·	1.5 km	MPC · JPL
656867	2016 EB_{188}	—	January 11, 2016	Haleakala	Pan-STARRS 1	·	940 m	MPC · JPL
656868	2016 EL_{188}	—	October 21, 2006	Kitt Peak	Spacewatch	KON	1.9 km	MPC · JPL
656869	2016 ET_{190}	—	March 25, 2012	Mount Lemmon	Mount Lemmon Survey	BRG	1.1 km	MPC · JPL
656870	2016 EZ_{193}	—	October 2, 2006	Mount Lemmon	Mount Lemmon Survey	·	1.1 km	MPC · JPL
656871	2016 EL_{199}	—	May 16, 2012	Kitt Peak	Spacewatch	·	1.2 km	MPC · JPL
656872	2016 EN_{201}	—	March 26, 2007	Mount Lemmon	Mount Lemmon Survey	AGN	780 m	MPC · JPL
656873	2016 EC_{203}	—	December 26, 2006	Catalina	CSS	·	1.9 km	MPC · JPL
656874	2016 EO_{212}	—	October 9, 2013	Mount Lemmon	Mount Lemmon Survey	·	2.0 km	MPC · JPL
656875	2016 EM_{213}	—	March 12, 2016	Haleakala	Pan-STARRS 1	·	1.1 km	MPC · JPL
656876	2016 EL_{217}	—	March 15, 2012	Mount Lemmon	Mount Lemmon Survey	·	940 m	MPC · JPL
656877	2016 EX_{217}	—	December 7, 2005	Kitt Peak	Spacewatch	·	1.8 km	MPC · JPL
656878	2016 EJ_{218}	—	December 1, 2005	Kitt Peak	Wasserman, L. H., Millis, R. L.	HOF	2.1 km	MPC · JPL
656879	2016 EM_{218}	—	March 13, 2016	Haleakala	Pan-STARRS 1	·	1.5 km	MPC · JPL
656880	2016 EN_{218}	—	December 28, 2014	Mount Lemmon	Mount Lemmon Survey	·	2.2 km	MPC · JPL
656881	2016 EQ_{218}	—	January 8, 2007	Kitt Peak	Spacewatch	·	1.2 km	MPC · JPL
656882	2016 EC_{219}	—	December 20, 2014	Haleakala	Pan-STARRS 1	·	1.3 km	MPC · JPL
656883	2016 ED_{219}	—	February 5, 2011	Mount Lemmon	Mount Lemmon Survey	·	1.3 km	MPC · JPL
656884	2016 EP_{219}	—	March 13, 2016	Haleakala	Pan-STARRS 1	·	1.1 km	MPC · JPL
656885	2016 EC_{220}	—	March 4, 2016	Haleakala	Pan-STARRS 1	·	1.4 km	MPC · JPL
656886	2016 EJ_{220}	—	November 26, 2014	Haleakala	Pan-STARRS 1	EUN	980 m	MPC · JPL
656887	2016 EW_{220}	—	February 5, 2011	Haleakala	Pan-STARRS 1	·	1.4 km	MPC · JPL
656888	2016 EJ_{221}	—	October 3, 2013	Haleakala	Pan-STARRS 1	·	1.7 km	MPC · JPL
656889	2016 ES_{222}	—	March 25, 2007	Mount Lemmon	Mount Lemmon Survey	·	1.9 km	MPC · JPL
656890	2016 EC_{223}	—	October 26, 2009	Kitt Peak	Spacewatch	·	1.6 km	MPC · JPL
656891	2016 EL_{225}	—	October 9, 2013	Mount Lemmon	Mount Lemmon Survey	KOR	1.1 km	MPC · JPL
656892	2016 ET_{226}	—	March 4, 2016	Haleakala	Pan-STARRS 1	·	1.6 km	MPC · JPL
656893	2016 EN_{227}	—	October 1, 2005	Mount Lemmon	Mount Lemmon Survey	·	1.0 km	MPC · JPL
656894	2016 EP_{227}	—	October 9, 2013	Mount Lemmon	Mount Lemmon Survey	·	1.5 km	MPC · JPL
656895	2016 EH_{229}	—	February 23, 2007	Mount Lemmon	Mount Lemmon Survey	·	1.3 km	MPC · JPL
656896	2016 EM_{232}	—	March 4, 2016	Haleakala	Pan-STARRS 1	·	1.1 km	MPC · JPL
656897	2016 EX_{232}	—	March 4, 2016	Haleakala	Pan-STARRS 1	HNS	840 m	MPC · JPL
656898	2016 EX_{233}	—	March 26, 2007	Mount Lemmon	Mount Lemmon Survey	·	1.3 km	MPC · JPL
656899	2016 EK_{235}	—	November 20, 2014	Haleakala	Pan-STARRS 1	·	1.4 km	MPC · JPL
656900	2016 EO_{235}	—	March 4, 2016	Haleakala	Pan-STARRS 1	·	900 m	MPC · JPL

== 656901–657000 ==
back to top

Designation			Discovery			Properties		Ref
Permanent	Provisional	Named after	Date	Site	Discoverer(s)	Category	Diam.	Ref
656901	2016 EE_{237}	—	October 4, 2013	Kitt Peak	Spacewatch	·	1.4 km	MPC · JPL
656902	2016 EX_{242}	—	December 16, 2006	Kitt Peak	Spacewatch	(5)	890 m	MPC · JPL
656903	2016 EE_{244}	—	October 30, 2014	Mount Lemmon	Mount Lemmon Survey	·	1.1 km	MPC · JPL
656904	2016 EN_{245}	—	January 30, 2006	Kitt Peak	Spacewatch	·	1.6 km	MPC · JPL
656905	2016 EU_{249}	—	September 3, 2013	Haleakala	Pan-STARRS 1	·	1.2 km	MPC · JPL
656906	2016 EG_{252}	—	March 5, 2016	Haleakala	Pan-STARRS 1	·	2.2 km	MPC · JPL
656907	2016 EU_{262}	—	March 13, 2016	Haleakala	Pan-STARRS 1	EUN	960 m	MPC · JPL
656908	2016 EE_{265}	—	March 10, 2016	Haleakala	Pan-STARRS 1	·	1.4 km	MPC · JPL
656909	2016 EG_{265}	—	March 6, 2016	Haleakala	Pan-STARRS 1	·	1.1 km	MPC · JPL
656910	2016 EX_{265}	—	March 7, 2016	Haleakala	Pan-STARRS 1	JUN	790 m	MPC · JPL
656911	2016 EV_{267}	—	February 4, 2016	Haleakala	Pan-STARRS 1	·	790 m	MPC · JPL
656912	2016 EA_{269}	—	March 6, 2016	Haleakala	Pan-STARRS 1	(194)	1.2 km	MPC · JPL
656913	2016 EW_{279}	—	March 4, 2016	Haleakala	Pan-STARRS 1	·	2.2 km	MPC · JPL
656914	2016 EG_{281}	—	October 22, 2014	Mount Lemmon	Mount Lemmon Survey	(17392)	1.1 km	MPC · JPL
656915	2016 EW_{292}	—	March 13, 2016	Haleakala	Pan-STARRS 1	·	2.6 km	MPC · JPL
656916	2016 EG_{296}	—	December 29, 2014	Mount Lemmon	Mount Lemmon Survey	HOF	2.1 km	MPC · JPL
656917	2016 EF_{298}	—	March 1, 2016	Mount Lemmon	Mount Lemmon Survey	·	1.4 km	MPC · JPL
656918	2016 EH_{300}	—	March 7, 2016	Haleakala	Pan-STARRS 1	·	1.4 km	MPC · JPL
656919	2016 EL_{300}	—	March 10, 2016	Haleakala	Pan-STARRS 1	·	1.3 km	MPC · JPL
656920	2016 EN_{300}	—	March 10, 2016	Haleakala	Pan-STARRS 1	AGN	840 m	MPC · JPL
656921	2016 EQ_{300}	—	December 12, 2014	Haleakala	Pan-STARRS 1	GEF	1.0 km	MPC · JPL
656922	2016 EC_{306}	—	April 19, 2012	Mount Lemmon	Mount Lemmon Survey	MAR	710 m	MPC · JPL
656923	2016 EZ_{309}	—	February 5, 2016	Haleakala	Pan-STARRS 1	·	1 km	MPC · JPL
656924	2016 EN_{311}	—	March 12, 2016	Haleakala	Pan-STARRS 1	KON	1.7 km	MPC · JPL
656925	2016 EG_{317}	—	March 12, 2016	Haleakala	Pan-STARRS 1	·	1.6 km	MPC · JPL
656926	2016 EU_{339}	—	March 15, 2016	Mount Lemmon	Mount Lemmon Survey	·	1.7 km	MPC · JPL
656927	2016 FQ_{1}	—	February 28, 2012	Haleakala	Pan-STARRS 1	·	1.3 km	MPC · JPL
656928	2016 FB_{3}	—	March 16, 2016	Haleakala	Pan-STARRS 1	H	480 m	MPC · JPL
656929	2016 FL_{8}	—	November 9, 2009	Kitt Peak	Spacewatch	·	2.0 km	MPC · JPL
656930	2016 FY_{8}	—	October 8, 2005	Kitt Peak	Spacewatch	·	1.4 km	MPC · JPL
656931	2016 FM_{10}	—	August 29, 2009	Kitt Peak	Spacewatch	·	1.4 km	MPC · JPL
656932	2016 FA_{12}	—	July 18, 2001	Palomar	NEAT	·	1.5 km	MPC · JPL
656933	2016 FN_{15}	—	January 5, 2012	Haleakala	Pan-STARRS 1	·	1.5 km	MPC · JPL
656934	2016 FA_{18}	—	January 17, 2016	Haleakala	Pan-STARRS 1	MRX	810 m	MPC · JPL
656935	2016 FM_{18}	—	September 7, 2014	Haleakala	Pan-STARRS 1	·	1.6 km	MPC · JPL
656936	2016 FO_{18}	—	September 19, 2014	Haleakala	Pan-STARRS 1	EUN	880 m	MPC · JPL
656937	2016 FC_{21}	—	March 14, 2007	Mount Lemmon	Mount Lemmon Survey	·	1.7 km	MPC · JPL
656938	2016 FK_{24}	—	October 28, 2005	Kitt Peak	Spacewatch	·	1.3 km	MPC · JPL
656939	2016 FY_{24}	—	March 18, 2016	Mount Lemmon	Mount Lemmon Survey	·	1.8 km	MPC · JPL
656940	2016 FC_{26}	—	September 4, 2007	Catalina	CSS	(2076)	610 m	MPC · JPL
656941	2016 FA_{28}	—	January 13, 2015	Haleakala	Pan-STARRS 1	KOR	1.1 km	MPC · JPL
656942	2016 FO_{28}	—	October 29, 2006	Mount Lemmon	Mount Lemmon Survey	T_{j} (2.96)	2.5 km	MPC · JPL
656943	2016 FS_{29}	—	May 19, 2012	Mount Lemmon	Mount Lemmon Survey	·	1.1 km	MPC · JPL
656944	2016 FL_{30}	—	July 20, 2013	Haleakala	Pan-STARRS 1	EUN	1.1 km	MPC · JPL
656945	2016 FU_{30}	—	November 16, 2006	Kitt Peak	Spacewatch	·	860 m	MPC · JPL
656946	2016 FU_{31}	—	October 31, 2006	Kitt Peak	Spacewatch	·	760 m	MPC · JPL
656947	2016 FZ_{31}	—	October 28, 2014	Kitt Peak	Spacewatch	·	1.4 km	MPC · JPL
656948	2016 FF_{33}	—	September 29, 2003	Kitt Peak	Spacewatch	KOR	950 m	MPC · JPL
656949	2016 FX_{33}	—	May 24, 2011	Nogales	M. Schwartz, P. R. Holvorcem	·	1.8 km	MPC · JPL
656950	2016 FK_{36}	—	April 21, 2012	Mount Lemmon	Mount Lemmon Survey	EUN	880 m	MPC · JPL
656951	2016 FD_{37}	—	March 8, 2005	Mount Lemmon	Mount Lemmon Survey	V	470 m	MPC · JPL
656952	2016 FH_{37}	—	October 22, 2006	Mount Lemmon	Mount Lemmon Survey	·	1.0 km	MPC · JPL
656953	2016 FN_{37}	—	March 31, 2016	Haleakala	Pan-STARRS 1	·	1.5 km	MPC · JPL
656954	2016 FY_{39}	—	February 10, 2010	Kitt Peak	Spacewatch	·	2.7 km	MPC · JPL
656955	2016 FJ_{42}	—	October 2, 2014	Haleakala	Pan-STARRS 1	·	1.6 km	MPC · JPL
656956	2016 FE_{44}	—	August 31, 2005	Kitt Peak	Spacewatch	·	1.7 km	MPC · JPL
656957	2016 FF_{44}	—	March 17, 2012	Kitt Peak	Spacewatch	·	1.0 km	MPC · JPL
656958	2016 FE_{46}	—	October 1, 2005	Kitt Peak	Spacewatch	EUN	820 m	MPC · JPL
656959	2016 FX_{47}	—	March 12, 2016	Haleakala	Pan-STARRS 1	·	940 m	MPC · JPL
656960	2016 FM_{49}	—	October 16, 2009	Mount Lemmon	Mount Lemmon Survey	·	1.3 km	MPC · JPL
656961	2016 FA_{50}	—	March 2, 2016	Haleakala	Pan-STARRS 1	·	1.3 km	MPC · JPL
656962	2016 FS_{50}	—	March 11, 2007	Mount Lemmon	Mount Lemmon Survey	·	1.7 km	MPC · JPL
656963	2016 FZ_{51}	—	March 4, 2016	Haleakala	Pan-STARRS 1	·	1.6 km	MPC · JPL
656964	2016 FS_{52}	—	November 24, 2008	Kitt Peak	Spacewatch	·	1.5 km	MPC · JPL
656965	2016 FV_{55}	—	December 20, 2014	Haleakala	Pan-STARRS 1	·	1.3 km	MPC · JPL
656966	2016 FY_{57}	—	January 6, 2006	Kitt Peak	Spacewatch	·	1.8 km	MPC · JPL
656967	2016 FG_{62}	—	March 17, 2016	Haleakala	Pan-STARRS 1	·	2.1 km	MPC · JPL
656968	2016 FU_{62}	—	April 7, 2005	Kitt Peak	Spacewatch	·	2.3 km	MPC · JPL
656969	2016 FF_{63}	—	February 7, 2011	Mount Lemmon	Mount Lemmon Survey	AGN	980 m	MPC · JPL
656970	2016 FH_{63}	—	January 9, 2006	Mount Lemmon	Mount Lemmon Survey	·	1.8 km	MPC · JPL
656971	2016 FP_{63}	—	May 11, 2007	Mount Lemmon	Mount Lemmon Survey	MRX	860 m	MPC · JPL
656972	2016 FU_{63}	—	November 2, 2007	Mount Lemmon	Mount Lemmon Survey	·	2.8 km	MPC · JPL
656973	2016 FL_{70}	—	March 16, 2016	Haleakala	Pan-STARRS 1	·	1.5 km	MPC · JPL
656974	2016 FK_{71}	—	March 30, 2016	Haleakala	Pan-STARRS 1	·	1.4 km	MPC · JPL
656975	2016 FC_{75}	—	November 25, 2006	Mount Lemmon	Mount Lemmon Survey	·	990 m	MPC · JPL
656976	2016 FQ_{78}	—	February 10, 2016	Haleakala	Pan-STARRS 1	·	1.4 km	MPC · JPL
656977	2016 FB_{79}	—	March 30, 2016	Haleakala	Pan-STARRS 1	·	1.4 km	MPC · JPL
656978	2016 FZ_{130}	—	March 27, 2016	Cerro Tololo-DECam	DECam	·	1.5 km	MPC · JPL
656979	2016 FG_{163}	—	March 30, 2016	Cerro Tololo-DECam	DECam	·	1.5 km	MPC · JPL
656980	2016 GL_{1}	—	September 10, 2010	Catalina	CSS	·	850 m	MPC · JPL
656981	2016 GL_{4}	—	March 27, 2012	Kitt Peak	Spacewatch	·	1.1 km	MPC · JPL
656982	2016 GG_{5}	—	February 10, 2016	Haleakala	Pan-STARRS 1	·	1.0 km	MPC · JPL
656983	2016 GA_{7}	—	March 14, 2012	Kitt Peak	Spacewatch	HNS	1.1 km	MPC · JPL
656984	2016 GS_{9}	—	December 11, 2014	Mount Lemmon	Mount Lemmon Survey	·	1.6 km	MPC · JPL
656985	2016 GX_{12}	—	November 6, 2010	Mount Lemmon	Mount Lemmon Survey	(5)	950 m	MPC · JPL
656986	2016 GB_{13}	—	January 19, 2007	Mauna Kea	P. A. Wiegert	·	1.2 km	MPC · JPL
656987	2016 GH_{13}	—	October 3, 2013	Haleakala	Pan-STARRS 1	AGN	970 m	MPC · JPL
656988	2016 GE_{15}	—	November 26, 2014	Haleakala	Pan-STARRS 1	·	1.1 km	MPC · JPL
656989	2016 GB_{16}	—	November 19, 2014	Mount Lemmon	Mount Lemmon Survey	·	1.1 km	MPC · JPL
656990	2016 GJ_{16}	—	November 17, 2014	Haleakala	Pan-STARRS 1	·	1.1 km	MPC · JPL
656991	2016 GM_{16}	—	March 11, 2016	Haleakala	Pan-STARRS 1	·	830 m	MPC · JPL
656992	2016 GO_{17}	—	September 18, 2004	Socorro	LINEAR	·	620 m	MPC · JPL
656993	2016 GK_{18}	—	February 10, 2011	Mount Lemmon	Mount Lemmon Survey	AGN	890 m	MPC · JPL
656994	2016 GS_{24}	—	November 17, 2014	Haleakala	Pan-STARRS 1	·	1.3 km	MPC · JPL
656995	2016 GW_{25}	—	March 28, 2016	Mount Lemmon	Mount Lemmon Survey	·	1.2 km	MPC · JPL
656996	2016 GM_{28}	—	November 22, 2014	Haleakala	Pan-STARRS 1	EUN	820 m	MPC · JPL
656997	2016 GE_{29}	—	October 12, 2005	Kitt Peak	Spacewatch	·	1.1 km	MPC · JPL
656998	2016 GP_{30}	—	February 23, 2007	Mount Lemmon	Mount Lemmon Survey	·	1.1 km	MPC · JPL
656999	2016 GN_{31}	—	September 30, 2005	Kitt Peak	Spacewatch	(5)	960 m	MPC · JPL
657000	2016 GS_{31}	—	September 15, 2009	Kitt Peak	Spacewatch	·	1.8 km	MPC · JPL

back to top

== Meaning of names ==
As minor planet discoveries are confirmed, they are given a permanent number by the IAU's Minor Planet Center (MPC), and the discoverers can then submit names for them, following the IAU's naming conventions. The list below concerns those minor planets in the specified number-range that have received names, and explains the meanings of those names.

Official naming citations of newly named small Solar System bodies are approved and published in a bulletin by IAU's Working Group for Small Bodies Nomenclature (WGSBN). Before May 2021, citations were published in MPC's Minor Planet Circulars for many decades. Recent citations can also be found on the JPL Small-Body Database (SBDB). Until his death in 2016, German astronomer Lutz D. Schmadel compiled these citations into the Dictionary of Minor Planet Names (DMP) and regularly updated the collection.

Based on Paul Herget's The Names of the Minor Planets, Schmadel also researched the unclear origin of numerous asteroids, most of which had been named prior to World War II. This article incorporates text from this source, which is in the public domain: SBDB New namings may only be added to this list below after official publication as the preannouncement of names is condemned. The WGSBN publishes a comprehensive guideline for the naming rules of non-cometary small Solar System bodies.

Named minor planet	Provisional	This minor planet was named for...	Ref · Catalog
656064 Vladimirasmolov	2015 UR_{66}	Vladimir Asmolov, distinguished Soviet and Russian thermal physicist.	IAU · 656064
656196 Falchi	2015 XA_{204}	Fabio Falchi, Italian high-school physics teacher and scientist.	IAU · 656196
656841 Uza	2016 EE_{160}	Dan-George Uza, Romanian amateur astronomer, author, translator and editor.	IAU · 656841
