= List of minor planets: 596001–597000 =

The following is a partial list of minor planets, running from minor-planet number 596001 through 597000, inclusive. The primary data for this and other partial lists is based on JPL's "Small-Body Orbital Elements" and data available from the Minor Planet Center. Critical list information is also provided by the MPC, unless otherwise specified from Lowell Observatory. A detailed description of the table's columns and additional sources are given on the main page including a complete list of every page in this series, and a statistical break-up on the dynamical classification of minor planets.

Also see the summary list of all named bodies in numerical and alphabetical order, and the corresponding naming citations for the number range of this particular list. New namings may only be added to this list after official publication, as the preannouncement of names is condemned by the Working Group for Small Bodies Nomenclature of the International Astronomical Union.

Near-Earth obj.	MBA (inner)	MBA (outer)	Centaur
Mars-crosser	MBA (middle)	Jupiter trojan	Trans-Neptunian obj.
Unclassified

== 596001–596100 ==
Designation			Discovery			Properties		Ref
Permanent	Provisional	Named after	Date	Site	Discoverer(s)	Category	Diam.	Ref
596001	2004 TP_{195}	—	October 7, 2004	Kitt Peak	Spacewatch	·	780 m	MPC · JPL
596002	2004 TL_{206}	—	October 7, 2004	Kitt Peak	Spacewatch	·	3.1 km	MPC · JPL
596003	2004 TV_{211}	—	October 8, 2004	Kitt Peak	Spacewatch	·	2.0 km	MPC · JPL
596004	2004 TF_{224}	—	October 8, 2004	Kitt Peak	Spacewatch	MRX	1.1 km	MPC · JPL
596005	2004 TH_{229}	—	October 8, 2004	Kitt Peak	Spacewatch	·	2.3 km	MPC · JPL
596006	2004 TA_{246}	—	October 7, 2004	Kitt Peak	Spacewatch	·	1.4 km	MPC · JPL
596007	2004 TR_{253}	—	October 9, 2004	Kitt Peak	Spacewatch	·	2.0 km	MPC · JPL
596008	2004 TE_{259}	—	October 9, 2004	Kitt Peak	Spacewatch	VER	2.2 km	MPC · JPL
596009	2004 TX_{263}	—	October 9, 2004	Kitt Peak	Spacewatch	·	2.6 km	MPC · JPL
596010	2004 TT_{283}	—	October 8, 2004	Kitt Peak	Spacewatch	·	1.4 km	MPC · JPL
596011	2004 TQ_{292}	—	October 10, 2004	Kitt Peak	Spacewatch	EOS	1.9 km	MPC · JPL
596012	2004 TT_{305}	—	October 10, 2004	Kitt Peak	Spacewatch	·	2.7 km	MPC · JPL
596013	2004 TS_{306}	—	October 10, 2004	Socorro	LINEAR	·	1.0 km	MPC · JPL
596014	2004 TV_{312}	—	October 11, 2004	Kitt Peak	Spacewatch	·	2.2 km	MPC · JPL
596015	2004 TN_{315}	—	October 11, 2004	Kitt Peak	Spacewatch	·	2.6 km	MPC · JPL
596016	2004 TP_{315}	—	September 23, 2004	Kitt Peak	Spacewatch	·	980 m	MPC · JPL
596017	2004 TS_{319}	—	October 11, 2004	Kitt Peak	Spacewatch	(5)	850 m	MPC · JPL
596018	2004 TC_{320}	—	October 11, 2004	Kitt Peak	Spacewatch	·	1.6 km	MPC · JPL
596019	2004 TB_{321}	—	October 11, 2004	Kitt Peak	Spacewatch	EOS	1.6 km	MPC · JPL
596020	2004 TF_{330}	—	October 9, 2004	Kitt Peak	Spacewatch	AST	1.4 km	MPC · JPL
596021	2004 TQ_{330}	—	October 9, 2004	Kitt Peak	Spacewatch	·	2.4 km	MPC · JPL
596022	2004 TN_{331}	—	October 9, 2004	Kitt Peak	Spacewatch	VER	2.0 km	MPC · JPL
596023	2004 TP_{335}	—	October 10, 2004	Kitt Peak	Spacewatch	·	2.9 km	MPC · JPL
596024	2004 TF_{344}	—	October 15, 2004	Kitt Peak	Spacewatch	·	2.1 km	MPC · JPL
596025	2004 TQ_{350}	—	October 15, 2004	Mount Lemmon	Mount Lemmon Survey	·	860 m	MPC · JPL
596026	2004 TH_{352}	—	October 11, 2004	Kitt Peak	Deep Ecliptic Survey	·	520 m	MPC · JPL
596027	2004 TM_{352}	—	September 11, 2004	Kitt Peak	Spacewatch	EOS	1.5 km	MPC · JPL
596028	2004 TA_{359}	—	October 7, 2004	Anderson Mesa	LONEOS	·	1.7 km	MPC · JPL
596029	2004 TB_{372}	—	January 24, 2012	Haleakala	Pan-STARRS 1	·	750 m	MPC · JPL
596030	2004 TF_{372}	—	August 8, 2008	Siding Spring	SSS	·	1.7 km	MPC · JPL
596031	2004 TU_{372}	—	October 8, 2004	Kitt Peak	Spacewatch	·	2.4 km	MPC · JPL
596032	2004 TO_{373}	—	September 4, 2008	Kitt Peak	Spacewatch	(5)	1.0 km	MPC · JPL
596033	2004 TA_{375}	—	October 23, 2011	Taunus	E. Schwab, R. Kling	·	490 m	MPC · JPL
596034	2004 TH_{381}	—	October 13, 2004	Kitt Peak	Spacewatch	·	1.2 km	MPC · JPL
596035	2004 TK_{381}	—	February 17, 2013	Kitt Peak	Spacewatch	TIR	2.6 km	MPC · JPL
596036	2004 TL_{382}	—	April 6, 2013	Mount Lemmon	Mount Lemmon Survey	·	2.4 km	MPC · JPL
596037	2004 TC_{385}	—	October 14, 2004	Kitt Peak	Spacewatch	·	2.5 km	MPC · JPL
596038	2004 TB_{387}	—	October 14, 2004	Kitt Peak	Spacewatch	·	500 m	MPC · JPL
596039	2004 UC_{11}	—	October 18, 2004	Socorro	LINEAR	·	1.0 km	MPC · JPL
596040	2004 VZ_{11}	—	November 3, 2004	Kitt Peak	Spacewatch	EUN	1.1 km	MPC · JPL
596041	2004 VV_{32}	—	November 3, 2004	Kitt Peak	Spacewatch	·	1.3 km	MPC · JPL
596042	2004 VX_{66}	—	November 7, 2004	Socorro	LINEAR	MAR	900 m	MPC · JPL
596043	2004 VB_{71}	—	November 7, 2004	Socorro	LINEAR	·	650 m	MPC · JPL
596044	2004 VD_{81}	—	November 4, 2004	Kitt Peak	Spacewatch	·	1.4 km	MPC · JPL
596045	2004 VQ_{82}	—	November 9, 2004	Catalina	CSS	EOS	2.1 km	MPC · JPL
596046	2004 VE_{83}	—	October 14, 2004	Kitt Peak	Spacewatch	·	2.2 km	MPC · JPL
596047	2004 VQ_{87}	—	October 15, 2004	Kitt Peak	Spacewatch	·	1.1 km	MPC · JPL
596048	2004 VD_{96}	—	November 11, 2004	Kitt Peak	Deep Ecliptic Survey	·	2.2 km	MPC · JPL
596049	2004 VN_{98}	—	October 15, 2004	Mount Lemmon	Mount Lemmon Survey	·	1.9 km	MPC · JPL
596050	2004 VS_{99}	—	November 9, 2004	Mauna Kea	Veillet, C.	THB	3.2 km	MPC · JPL
596051	2004 VD_{100}	—	October 10, 2004	Kitt Peak	Spacewatch	·	1.7 km	MPC · JPL
596052	2004 VN_{118}	—	April 15, 2008	Mount Lemmon	Mount Lemmon Survey	·	1.9 km	MPC · JPL
596053	2004 VR_{118}	—	November 3, 2004	Kitt Peak	Spacewatch	BAR	1.0 km	MPC · JPL
596054	2004 VA_{134}	—	April 12, 2011	Mount Lemmon	Mount Lemmon Survey	HNS	960 m	MPC · JPL
596055	2004 VR_{135}	—	July 25, 2015	Haleakala	Pan-STARRS 1	·	3.5 km	MPC · JPL
596056	2004 VQ_{137}	—	June 2, 2014	Haleakala	Pan-STARRS 1	VER	2.4 km	MPC · JPL
596057	2004 VE_{138}	—	November 4, 2004	Catalina	CSS	·	880 m	MPC · JPL
596058	2004 WZ_{4}	—	November 4, 2004	Catalina	CSS	·	3.2 km	MPC · JPL
596059	2004 XE_{33}	—	December 10, 2004	Socorro	LINEAR	·	1.2 km	MPC · JPL
596060	2004 XQ_{47}	—	December 9, 2004	Kitt Peak	Spacewatch	MAR	1.1 km	MPC · JPL
596061	2004 XD_{66}	—	November 4, 2004	Kitt Peak	Spacewatch	·	3.8 km	MPC · JPL
596062	2004 XF_{76}	—	December 10, 2004	Kitt Peak	Spacewatch	HNS	1.2 km	MPC · JPL
596063	2004 XX_{86}	—	December 7, 2004	Socorro	LINEAR	·	3.9 km	MPC · JPL
596064	2004 XF_{106}	—	November 20, 2004	Kitt Peak	Spacewatch	THB	2.7 km	MPC · JPL
596065	2004 XJ_{112}	—	December 10, 2004	Kitt Peak	Spacewatch	·	2.1 km	MPC · JPL
596066	2004 XO_{113}	—	December 10, 2004	Kitt Peak	Spacewatch	·	1.2 km	MPC · JPL
596067	2004 XU_{170}	—	December 9, 2004	Kitt Peak	Spacewatch	MAR	1.0 km	MPC · JPL
596068	2004 XM_{174}	—	December 10, 2004	Kitt Peak	Spacewatch	·	3.0 km	MPC · JPL
596069	2004 XE_{176}	—	December 11, 2004	Kitt Peak	Spacewatch	·	1.3 km	MPC · JPL
596070	2004 XF_{193}	—	December 14, 2004	Kitt Peak	Spacewatch	MAR	1.4 km	MPC · JPL
596071	2004 XJ_{193}	—	April 23, 2015	Haleakala	Pan-STARRS 1	EUN	1.1 km	MPC · JPL
596072	2004 XN_{193}	—	May 13, 2007	Kitt Peak	Spacewatch	VER	2.5 km	MPC · JPL
596073	2004 XS_{196}	—	September 25, 2008	Kitt Peak	Spacewatch	(7744)	1.2 km	MPC · JPL
596074	2004 XD_{198}	—	September 28, 2009	Catalina	CSS	THB	2.4 km	MPC · JPL
596075	2004 YJ_{5}	—	December 20, 2004	Bergisch Gladbach	W. Bickel	·	1.7 km	MPC · JPL
596076	2004 YJ_{18}	—	December 19, 2004	Mount Lemmon	Mount Lemmon Survey	·	1.7 km	MPC · JPL
596077	2004 YY_{26}	—	December 19, 2004	Mount Lemmon	Mount Lemmon Survey	·	2.4 km	MPC · JPL
596078	2004 YZ_{29}	—	December 31, 2000	Kitt Peak	Spacewatch	·	1.8 km	MPC · JPL
596079	2004 YF_{37}	—	November 14, 2002	Palomar	NEAT	L5	10 km	MPC · JPL
596080	2005 AP_{40}	—	January 15, 2005	Socorro	LINEAR	·	1.8 km	MPC · JPL
596081	2005 AF_{52}	—	January 13, 2005	Kitt Peak	Spacewatch	·	1.3 km	MPC · JPL
596082	2005 AH_{52}	—	August 27, 2003	Palomar	NEAT	·	5.0 km	MPC · JPL
596083	2005 AU_{52}	—	January 13, 2005	Kitt Peak	Spacewatch	·	610 m	MPC · JPL
596084	2005 AD_{67}	—	January 13, 2005	Kitt Peak	Spacewatch	EUN	1.2 km	MPC · JPL
596085	2005 AO_{70}	—	January 15, 2005	Kitt Peak	Spacewatch	L5 · (291316)	10 km	MPC · JPL
596086	2005 AQ_{72}	—	January 15, 2005	Kitt Peak	Spacewatch	·	1.5 km	MPC · JPL
596087	2005 AH_{77}	—	January 15, 2005	Kitt Peak	Spacewatch	·	2.8 km	MPC · JPL
596088	2005 AQ_{83}	—	March 31, 2009	Kitt Peak	Spacewatch	NYS	900 m	MPC · JPL
596089	2005 AS_{83}	—	August 24, 2008	Kitt Peak	Spacewatch	·	3.0 km	MPC · JPL
596090	2005 AQ_{84}	—	October 20, 2007	Mount Lemmon	Mount Lemmon Survey	·	670 m	MPC · JPL
596091	2005 AS_{84}	—	October 9, 2007	Mount Lemmon	Mount Lemmon Survey	·	610 m	MPC · JPL
596092	2005 AY_{84}	—	January 15, 2005	Kitt Peak	Spacewatch	·	1.2 km	MPC · JPL
596093	2005 BD_{2}	—	January 8, 2005	Vallemare Borbona	V. S. Casulli	·	3.4 km	MPC · JPL
596094	2005 BJ_{14}	—	January 20, 2005	Wrightwood	J. W. Young	·	1.3 km	MPC · JPL
596095	2005 BA_{23}	—	January 16, 2005	Kitt Peak	Spacewatch	HNS	1.1 km	MPC · JPL
596096	2005 BV_{27}	—	January 19, 2005	Kitt Peak	Spacewatch	H	480 m	MPC · JPL
596097	2005 BO_{32}	—	January 16, 2005	Mauna Kea	Veillet, C.	·	1.9 km	MPC · JPL
596098	2005 BY_{32}	—	January 16, 2005	Mauna Kea	Veillet, C.	·	600 m	MPC · JPL
596099	2005 BN_{33}	—	January 16, 2005	Mauna Kea	Veillet, C.	HNS	850 m	MPC · JPL
596100	2005 BG_{36}	—	January 16, 2005	Mauna Kea	Veillet, C.	NEM	2.1 km	MPC · JPL

== 596101–596200 ==
back to top

Designation			Discovery			Properties		Ref
Permanent	Provisional	Named after	Date	Site	Discoverer(s)	Category	Diam.	Ref
596101	2005 BZ_{36}	—	January 16, 2005	Mauna Kea	Veillet, C.	·	560 m	MPC · JPL
596102	2005 BF_{40}	—	January 16, 2005	Mauna Kea	Veillet, C.	·	470 m	MPC · JPL
596103	2005 BH_{47}	—	November 15, 2003	Kitt Peak	Spacewatch	·	2.3 km	MPC · JPL
596104	2005 BF_{50}	—	January 20, 2012	Kitt Peak	Spacewatch	V	810 m	MPC · JPL
596105	2005 BH_{50}	—	December 31, 2011	Kitt Peak	Spacewatch	NYS	620 m	MPC · JPL
596106	2005 BL_{50}	—	February 25, 2012	Kitt Peak	Spacewatch	·	680 m	MPC · JPL
596107	2005 BQ_{53}	—	February 24, 2012	Kitt Peak	Spacewatch	·	590 m	MPC · JPL
596108	2005 BY_{55}	—	January 17, 2005	Kitt Peak	Spacewatch	·	950 m	MPC · JPL
596109	2005 CB_{5}	—	February 1, 2005	Palomar	NEAT	·	2.8 km	MPC · JPL
596110	2005 CM_{54}	—	December 20, 2004	Mount Lemmon	Mount Lemmon Survey	·	1.8 km	MPC · JPL
596111	2005 CG_{58}	—	February 2, 2005	Catalina	CSS	·	1.3 km	MPC · JPL
596112	2005 CS_{78}	—	February 9, 2005	Mount Lemmon	Mount Lemmon Survey	MAS	610 m	MPC · JPL
596113	2005 CR_{82}	—	February 4, 2005	Kitt Peak	Spacewatch	·	970 m	MPC · JPL
596114	2005 CC_{83}	—	December 14, 2010	Kitt Peak	Spacewatch	TIR	2.9 km	MPC · JPL
596115	2005 CF_{83}	—	February 2, 2005	Kitt Peak	Spacewatch	H	450 m	MPC · JPL
596116	2005 CQ_{83}	—	April 25, 2015	Haleakala	Pan-STARRS 1	·	1.5 km	MPC · JPL
596117	2005 CB_{84}	—	February 3, 2012	Haleakala	Pan-STARRS 1	PHO	630 m	MPC · JPL
596118	2005 CG_{84}	—	April 18, 2009	Mount Lemmon	Mount Lemmon Survey	·	760 m	MPC · JPL
596119	2005 CH_{85}	—	February 13, 2005	La Silla	A. Boattini	·	1.5 km	MPC · JPL
596120	2005 CU_{86}	—	September 23, 2008	Mount Lemmon	Mount Lemmon Survey	·	1.6 km	MPC · JPL
596121	2005 CY_{86}	—	October 22, 2012	Haleakala	Pan-STARRS 1	MRX	970 m	MPC · JPL
596122	2005 CE_{87}	—	March 31, 2009	Mount Lemmon	Mount Lemmon Survey	NYS	890 m	MPC · JPL
596123	2005 CM_{88}	—	March 28, 2009	Kitt Peak	Spacewatch	MAS	520 m	MPC · JPL
596124	2005 DO_{2}	—	February 16, 2005	La Silla	A. Boattini	·	1.8 km	MPC · JPL
596125	2005 DZ_{3}	—	February 18, 2005	La Silla	A. Boattini	·	1.5 km	MPC · JPL
596126	2005 EX	—	March 3, 2005	Mayhill	Lowe, A.	·	1.5 km	MPC · JPL
596127	2005 ER_{14}	—	March 3, 2005	Kitt Peak	Spacewatch	HNS	1.1 km	MPC · JPL
596128	2005 EY_{14}	—	March 3, 2005	Kitt Peak	Spacewatch	HNS	1.3 km	MPC · JPL
596129	2005 EK_{15}	—	March 3, 2005	Kitt Peak	Spacewatch	·	1.5 km	MPC · JPL
596130	2005 ER_{15}	—	March 3, 2005	Kitt Peak	Spacewatch	·	560 m	MPC · JPL
596131	2005 EX_{34}	—	March 3, 2005	Catalina	CSS	·	1.4 km	MPC · JPL
596132	2005 EU_{37}	—	March 3, 2005	Vail-Jarnac	Jarnac	·	740 m	MPC · JPL
596133	2005 EO_{45}	—	February 9, 2005	Kitt Peak	Spacewatch	EUN	1.2 km	MPC · JPL
596134	2005 EP_{93}	—	September 18, 1995	Kitt Peak	Spacewatch	MAS	620 m	MPC · JPL
596135	2005 EX_{103}	—	March 4, 2005	Kitt Peak	Spacewatch	NYS	810 m	MPC · JPL
596136	2005 EE_{109}	—	March 4, 2005	Catalina	CSS	·	1.6 km	MPC · JPL
596137	2005 EA_{131}	—	March 9, 2005	Mount Lemmon	Mount Lemmon Survey	·	740 m	MPC · JPL
596138	2005 EX_{140}	—	February 4, 2005	Kitt Peak	Spacewatch	·	680 m	MPC · JPL
596139	2005 EX_{158}	—	March 9, 2005	Mount Lemmon	Mount Lemmon Survey	MAS	560 m	MPC · JPL
596140	2005 ER_{163}	—	March 10, 2005	Mount Lemmon	Mount Lemmon Survey	·	1.3 km	MPC · JPL
596141	2005 EA_{176}	—	March 8, 2005	Kitt Peak	Spacewatch	·	1.0 km	MPC · JPL
596142	2005 ER_{193}	—	March 11, 2005	Mount Lemmon	Mount Lemmon Survey	·	1.4 km	MPC · JPL
596143	2005 EW_{194}	—	March 11, 2005	Mount Lemmon	Mount Lemmon Survey	·	780 m	MPC · JPL
596144	2005 EV_{209}	—	March 4, 2005	Kitt Peak	Spacewatch	·	1.9 km	MPC · JPL
596145	2005 EE_{211}	—	March 4, 2005	Catalina	CSS	·	890 m	MPC · JPL
596146	2005 EY_{234}	—	March 10, 2005	Mount Lemmon	Mount Lemmon Survey	KOR	1.1 km	MPC · JPL
596147	2005 EZ_{235}	—	September 20, 1995	Kitt Peak	Spacewatch	NYS	890 m	MPC · JPL
596148	2005 EG_{236}	—	March 10, 2005	Mount Lemmon	Mount Lemmon Survey	·	780 m	MPC · JPL
596149	2005 EW_{259}	—	March 11, 2005	Mount Lemmon	Mount Lemmon Survey	NYS	1.1 km	MPC · JPL
596150	2005 ET_{261}	—	March 13, 2005	Kitt Peak	Spacewatch	·	3.8 km	MPC · JPL
596151	2005 EM_{273}	—	March 3, 2005	Kitt Peak	Spacewatch	·	1.5 km	MPC · JPL
596152	2005 EN_{297}	—	February 9, 2005	Mount Lemmon	Mount Lemmon Survey	ELF	3.0 km	MPC · JPL
596153	2005 EX_{302}	—	October 21, 2003	Kitt Peak	Spacewatch	V	400 m	MPC · JPL
596154	2005 EE_{306}	—	March 4, 2005	Mount Lemmon	Mount Lemmon Survey	·	1.5 km	MPC · JPL
596155	2005 ED_{307}	—	March 8, 2005	Mount Lemmon	Mount Lemmon Survey	·	1.3 km	MPC · JPL
596156	2005 EH_{308}	—	March 8, 2005	Mount Lemmon	Mount Lemmon Survey	·	1.7 km	MPC · JPL
596157	2005 EQ_{309}	—	March 9, 2005	Mount Lemmon	Mount Lemmon Survey	MRX	720 m	MPC · JPL
596158	2005 EG_{313}	—	March 4, 2005	Mount Lemmon	Mount Lemmon Survey	HOF	2.6 km	MPC · JPL
596159	2005 EK_{329}	—	April 22, 2009	Mount Lemmon	Mount Lemmon Survey	·	740 m	MPC · JPL
596160	2005 EM_{331}	—	March 10, 2005	Mount Lemmon	Mount Lemmon Survey	·	900 m	MPC · JPL
596161	2005 EG_{334}	—	March 8, 2005	Mount Lemmon	Mount Lemmon Survey	·	670 m	MPC · JPL
596162	2005 ET_{335}	—	March 9, 2005	Kitt Peak	Spacewatch	·	1.6 km	MPC · JPL
596163	2005 EE_{337}	—	January 27, 2012	Mount Lemmon	Mount Lemmon Survey	·	770 m	MPC · JPL
596164	2005 EN_{337}	—	April 27, 2009	Mount Lemmon	Mount Lemmon Survey	·	1.0 km	MPC · JPL
596165	2005 ES_{338}	—	August 27, 2011	Haleakala	Pan-STARRS 1	·	1.6 km	MPC · JPL
596166	2005 EW_{338}	—	March 13, 2005	Kitt Peak	Spacewatch	NYS	810 m	MPC · JPL
596167	2005 ED_{339}	—	February 9, 2016	Haleakala	Pan-STARRS 1	MAS	540 m	MPC · JPL
596168	2005 EE_{340}	—	March 13, 2012	Kitt Peak	Spacewatch	·	650 m	MPC · JPL
596169	2005 ES_{340}	—	March 12, 2005	Kitt Peak	Spacewatch	·	2.0 km	MPC · JPL
596170	2005 EU_{340}	—	December 26, 2017	Mount Lemmon	Mount Lemmon Survey	H	430 m	MPC · JPL
596171	2005 EW_{340}	—	July 21, 2006	Lulin	LUSS	·	640 m	MPC · JPL
596172	2005 EE_{341}	—	March 11, 2005	Mount Lemmon	Mount Lemmon Survey	EUN	950 m	MPC · JPL
596173	2005 EH_{341}	—	March 13, 2005	Kitt Peak	Spacewatch	·	1.2 km	MPC · JPL
596174	2005 ET_{342}	—	June 17, 2015	Haleakala	Pan-STARRS 1	·	1.3 km	MPC · JPL
596175	2005 EY_{343}	—	February 26, 2014	Haleakala	Pan-STARRS 1	·	1.7 km	MPC · JPL
596176	2005 ED_{347}	—	March 3, 2005	Kitt Peak	Spacewatch	·	490 m	MPC · JPL
596177	2005 FU_{10}	—	August 14, 2013	Haleakala	Pan-STARRS 1	·	2.6 km	MPC · JPL
596178	2005 FZ_{16}	—	January 25, 2009	Kitt Peak	Spacewatch	AGN	1.1 km	MPC · JPL
596179	2005 FF_{17}	—	March 17, 2005	Kitt Peak	Spacewatch	·	590 m	MPC · JPL
596180	2005 FO_{17}	—	June 12, 2015	Mount Lemmon	Mount Lemmon Survey	·	530 m	MPC · JPL
596181	2005 FS_{17}	—	September 26, 2008	Kitt Peak	Spacewatch	·	2.0 km	MPC · JPL
596182	2005 FV_{18}	—	February 27, 2012	Haleakala	Pan-STARRS 1	·	510 m	MPC · JPL
596183	2005 GK_{3}	—	April 1, 2005	Kitt Peak	Spacewatch	·	1 km	MPC · JPL
596184	2005 GQ_{5}	—	April 1, 2005	Kitt Peak	Spacewatch	·	1.1 km	MPC · JPL
596185	2005 GY_{46}	—	March 17, 2005	Kitt Peak	Spacewatch	·	900 m	MPC · JPL
596186	2005 GZ_{62}	—	March 10, 2005	Mount Lemmon	Mount Lemmon Survey	·	1.9 km	MPC · JPL
596187	2005 GB_{67}	—	April 2, 2005	Mount Lemmon	Mount Lemmon Survey	·	770 m	MPC · JPL
596188	2005 GX_{96}	—	April 6, 2005	Mount Lemmon	Mount Lemmon Survey	H	310 m	MPC · JPL
596189	2005 GX_{103}	—	April 9, 2005	Mount Lemmon	Mount Lemmon Survey	·	900 m	MPC · JPL
596190	2005 GK_{107}	—	April 10, 2005	Mount Lemmon	Mount Lemmon Survey	·	2.2 km	MPC · JPL
596191	2005 GL_{107}	—	March 9, 2005	Mount Lemmon	Mount Lemmon Survey	NYS	1.0 km	MPC · JPL
596192	2005 GN_{109}	—	April 10, 2005	Mount Lemmon	Mount Lemmon Survey	NYS	870 m	MPC · JPL
596193	2005 GL_{126}	—	April 11, 2005	Mount Lemmon	Mount Lemmon Survey	·	1.4 km	MPC · JPL
596194	2005 GR_{129}	—	April 7, 2005	Kitt Peak	Spacewatch	·	1.8 km	MPC · JPL
596195	2005 GR_{133}	—	March 14, 2005	Mount Lemmon	Mount Lemmon Survey	·	1.8 km	MPC · JPL
596196	2005 GB_{145}	—	April 11, 2005	Kitt Peak	Spacewatch	NYS	870 m	MPC · JPL
596197	2005 GB_{152}	—	April 12, 2005	Kitt Peak	Spacewatch	3:2	4.4 km	MPC · JPL
596198	2005 GH_{169}	—	April 12, 2005	Kitt Peak	Spacewatch	·	2.1 km	MPC · JPL
596199	2005 GW_{176}	—	April 4, 2005	Kitt Peak	Spacewatch	(18466)	2.4 km	MPC · JPL
596200	2005 GV_{181}	—	April 1, 2005	Kitt Peak	Spacewatch	·	880 m	MPC · JPL

== 596201–596300 ==
back to top

Designation			Discovery			Properties		Ref
Permanent	Provisional	Named after	Date	Site	Discoverer(s)	Category	Diam.	Ref
596201	2005 GS_{184}	—	April 10, 2005	Kitt Peak	Deep Ecliptic Survey	NYS	780 m	MPC · JPL
596202	2005 GB_{190}	—	October 12, 1999	Kitt Peak	Spacewatch	·	870 m	MPC · JPL
596203	2005 GB_{200}	—	April 10, 2005	Kitt Peak	Deep Ecliptic Survey	·	2.3 km	MPC · JPL
596204	2005 GE_{201}	—	April 4, 2005	Mount Lemmon	Mount Lemmon Survey	EUN	760 m	MPC · JPL
596205	2005 GZ_{204}	—	April 11, 2005	Mount Lemmon	Mount Lemmon Survey	MAS	540 m	MPC · JPL
596206	2005 GB_{207}	—	March 11, 2005	Kitt Peak	Spacewatch	MAS	810 m	MPC · JPL
596207	2005 GG_{216}	—	April 1, 2005	Kitt Peak	Spacewatch	MAS	630 m	MPC · JPL
596208	2005 GS_{217}	—	April 2, 2005	Kitt Peak	Spacewatch	·	580 m	MPC · JPL
596209	2005 GO_{230}	—	February 22, 2012	Kitt Peak	Spacewatch	NYS	740 m	MPC · JPL
596210	2005 GS_{230}	—	April 4, 2005	Kitt Peak	Spacewatch	·	860 m	MPC · JPL
596211	2005 GT_{231}	—	April 7, 2005	Kitt Peak	Spacewatch	BRA	1.5 km	MPC · JPL
596212	2005 GD_{235}	—	January 31, 2014	Haleakala	Pan-STARRS 1	·	1.7 km	MPC · JPL
596213	2005 GE_{236}	—	February 1, 2012	Kitt Peak	Spacewatch	MAS	660 m	MPC · JPL
596214	2005 GJ_{236}	—	December 30, 2007	Kitt Peak	Spacewatch	·	930 m	MPC · JPL
596215	2005 GL_{238}	—	April 23, 2009	Mount Lemmon	Mount Lemmon Survey	MAS	620 m	MPC · JPL
596216	2005 GM_{238}	—	April 4, 2005	Mount Lemmon	Mount Lemmon Survey	NYS	720 m	MPC · JPL
596217	2005 HZ_{10}	—	September 24, 2013	Catalina	CSS	·	1.2 km	MPC · JPL
596218	2005 HS_{11}	—	February 3, 2009	Kitt Peak	Spacewatch	MRX	950 m	MPC · JPL
596219	2005 HA_{12}	—	February 28, 2014	Haleakala	Pan-STARRS 1	·	1.4 km	MPC · JPL
596220	2005 HW_{12}	—	April 30, 2005	Kitt Peak	Spacewatch	·	1.6 km	MPC · JPL
596221	2005 JJ_{7}	—	April 4, 2005	Mount Lemmon	Mount Lemmon Survey	·	1.9 km	MPC · JPL
596222	2005 JB_{8}	—	May 4, 2005	Mauna Kea	Veillet, C.	·	1.4 km	MPC · JPL
596223	2005 JW_{9}	—	May 4, 2005	Mauna Kea	Veillet, C.	·	880 m	MPC · JPL
596224	2005 JX_{10}	—	May 4, 2005	Mauna Kea	Veillet, C.	·	1.9 km	MPC · JPL
596225	2005 JJ_{11}	—	May 4, 2005	Mauna Kea	Veillet, C.	ANF	1.3 km	MPC · JPL
596226	2005 JV_{12}	—	May 4, 2005	Mauna Kea	Veillet, C.	·	950 m	MPC · JPL
596227	2005 JU_{16}	—	March 11, 2005	Kitt Peak	Spacewatch	·	1.8 km	MPC · JPL
596228	2005 JY_{19}	—	March 20, 2001	Kitt Peak	Spacewatch	·	990 m	MPC · JPL
596229	2005 JN_{22}	—	May 7, 2005	Mount Lemmon	Mount Lemmon Survey	H	440 m	MPC · JPL
596230	2005 JA_{23}	—	May 2, 2005	Kitt Peak	Spacewatch	·	2.0 km	MPC · JPL
596231	2005 JC_{33}	—	May 4, 2005	Mount Lemmon	Mount Lemmon Survey	·	500 m	MPC · JPL
596232	2005 JS_{44}	—	May 4, 2005	Kitt Peak	Spacewatch	H	440 m	MPC · JPL
596233	2005 JF_{60}	—	May 8, 2005	Kitt Peak	Spacewatch	V	560 m	MPC · JPL
596234	2005 JY_{77}	—	May 10, 2005	Anderson Mesa	LONEOS	PHO	830 m	MPC · JPL
596235	2005 JN_{80}	—	May 10, 2005	Kitt Peak	Spacewatch	PHO	660 m	MPC · JPL
596236	2005 JF_{81}	—	May 11, 2005	Palomar	NEAT	H	470 m	MPC · JPL
596237	2005 JJ_{95}	—	May 8, 2005	Mount Lemmon	Mount Lemmon Survey	·	1.1 km	MPC · JPL
596238	2005 JX_{96}	—	May 8, 2005	Kitt Peak	Spacewatch	GEF	950 m	MPC · JPL
596239	2005 JC_{101}	—	April 11, 2005	Mount Lemmon	Mount Lemmon Survey	·	560 m	MPC · JPL
596240	2005 JN_{107}	—	April 11, 2005	Mount Lemmon	Mount Lemmon Survey	DOR	2.4 km	MPC · JPL
596241	2005 JB_{119}	—	May 10, 2005	Mount Lemmon	Mount Lemmon Survey	·	2.2 km	MPC · JPL
596242	2005 JF_{121}	—	May 10, 2005	Kitt Peak	Spacewatch	·	2.5 km	MPC · JPL
596243	2005 JS_{124}	—	May 11, 2005	Mount Lemmon	Mount Lemmon Survey	KOR	1.2 km	MPC · JPL
596244	2005 JQ_{142}	—	April 1, 2005	Anderson Mesa	LONEOS	GEF	1.5 km	MPC · JPL
596245	2005 JK_{143}	—	May 15, 2005	Mount Lemmon	Mount Lemmon Survey	·	890 m	MPC · JPL
596246	2005 JS_{144}	—	May 15, 2005	Mount Lemmon	Mount Lemmon Survey	·	1.1 km	MPC · JPL
596247	2005 JM_{151}	—	May 4, 2005	Kitt Peak	Spacewatch	·	790 m	MPC · JPL
596248	2005 JF_{153}	—	May 4, 2005	Mount Lemmon	Mount Lemmon Survey	·	960 m	MPC · JPL
596249	2005 JG_{154}	—	April 16, 2005	Kitt Peak	Spacewatch	·	2.0 km	MPC · JPL
596250	2005 JV_{168}	—	May 9, 2005	Cerro Tololo	Deep Ecliptic Survey	AST	1.4 km	MPC · JPL
596251	2005 JC_{169}	—	May 9, 2005	Cerro Tololo	Deep Ecliptic Survey	KOR	1.1 km	MPC · JPL
596252	2005 JF_{174}	—	May 10, 2005	Mount Lemmon	Mount Lemmon Survey	·	1.4 km	MPC · JPL
596253	2005 JY_{182}	—	May 10, 2005	Kitt Peak	Spacewatch	·	1.5 km	MPC · JPL
596254	2005 JQ_{188}	—	June 24, 2009	Mount Lemmon	Mount Lemmon Survey	·	940 m	MPC · JPL
596255	2005 JW_{188}	—	May 14, 2005	Kitt Peak	Spacewatch	NAE	2.0 km	MPC · JPL
596256	2005 JL_{189}	—	May 20, 2005	Mount Lemmon	Mount Lemmon Survey	EOS	1.8 km	MPC · JPL
596257	2005 JW_{191}	—	August 28, 2006	Kitt Peak	Spacewatch	THM	2.0 km	MPC · JPL
596258	2005 JE_{192}	—	September 12, 2009	Kitt Peak	Spacewatch	L4	6.9 km	MPC · JPL
596259	2005 JK_{195}	—	May 3, 2005	Kitt Peak	Spacewatch	·	1.4 km	MPC · JPL
596260	2005 KG_{4}	—	May 17, 2005	Mount Lemmon	Mount Lemmon Survey	·	1.5 km	MPC · JPL
596261	2005 KK_{12}	—	May 8, 2005	Mount Lemmon	Mount Lemmon Survey	·	1.1 km	MPC · JPL
596262	2005 LK_{29}	—	June 10, 2005	Kitt Peak	Spacewatch	JUN	970 m	MPC · JPL
596263	2005 LJ_{35}	—	June 10, 2005	Kitt Peak	Spacewatch	PHO	1.0 km	MPC · JPL
596264	2005 LP_{54}	—	June 13, 2005	Kitt Peak	Spacewatch	·	1.8 km	MPC · JPL
596265	2005 LQ_{54}	—	June 6, 2005	Kitt Peak	Spacewatch	NYS	1.0 km	MPC · JPL
596266	2005 LV_{54}	—	December 26, 2011	Mount Lemmon	Mount Lemmon Survey	·	1.7 km	MPC · JPL
596267	2005 LD_{55}	—	February 12, 2008	Kitt Peak	Spacewatch	·	720 m	MPC · JPL
596268	2005 LG_{55}	—	February 1, 2009	Kitt Peak	Spacewatch	GEF	870 m	MPC · JPL
596269	2005 LW_{56}	—	October 16, 2012	Mount Lemmon	Mount Lemmon Survey	THM	1.6 km	MPC · JPL
596270	2005 LP_{58}	—	June 13, 2005	Mount Lemmon	Mount Lemmon Survey	NYS	1.0 km	MPC · JPL
596271	2005 MS_{13}	—	June 17, 2005	Kitt Peak	Spacewatch	PHO	890 m	MPC · JPL
596272	2005 MW_{51}	—	June 30, 2005	Kitt Peak	Spacewatch	·	710 m	MPC · JPL
596273	2005 MY_{55}	—	June 17, 2005	Mount Lemmon	Mount Lemmon Survey	·	780 m	MPC · JPL
596274	2005 MW_{56}	—	June 29, 2005	Kitt Peak	Spacewatch	·	2.8 km	MPC · JPL
596275	2005 NE_{22}	—	July 1, 2005	Kitt Peak	Spacewatch	·	1.4 km	MPC · JPL
596276	2005 NL_{24}	—	October 14, 2001	Kitt Peak	Spacewatch	·	1.0 km	MPC · JPL
596277	2005 NG_{36}	—	June 13, 2005	Mount Lemmon	Mount Lemmon Survey	·	1.7 km	MPC · JPL
596278	2005 NU_{44}	—	July 5, 2005	Palomar	NEAT	·	990 m	MPC · JPL
596279	2005 NO_{92}	—	July 5, 2005	Kitt Peak	Spacewatch	·	820 m	MPC · JPL
596280	2005 NH_{98}	—	July 9, 2005	Kitt Peak	Spacewatch	·	550 m	MPC · JPL
596281	2005 NR_{104}	—	July 15, 2005	Kitt Peak	Spacewatch	·	720 m	MPC · JPL
596282	2005 NY_{109}	—	July 7, 2005	Mauna Kea	Veillet, C.	KOR	1 km	MPC · JPL
596283	2005 NN_{124}	—	October 28, 2010	Catalina	CSS	·	1.3 km	MPC · JPL
596284	2005 OZ_{7}	—	July 30, 2005	Campo Imperatore	CINEOS	H	490 m	MPC · JPL
596285	2005 OH_{16}	—	July 29, 2005	Palomar	NEAT	·	1.4 km	MPC · JPL
596286	2005 OE_{17}	—	May 1, 2001	Kitt Peak	Spacewatch	V	600 m	MPC · JPL
596287	2005 OJ_{23}	—	July 1, 2005	Catalina	CSS	·	2.0 km	MPC · JPL
596288	2005 OZ_{25}	—	July 31, 2005	Palomar	NEAT	·	2.0 km	MPC · JPL
596289	2005 OH_{32}	—	February 10, 2011	Mount Lemmon	Mount Lemmon Survey	·	1.2 km	MPC · JPL
596290	2005 OL_{33}	—	July 28, 2005	Palomar	NEAT	·	1.9 km	MPC · JPL
596291	2005 OQ_{33}	—	July 30, 2005	Palomar	NEAT	·	1.8 km	MPC · JPL
596292	2005 OV_{33}	—	July 18, 2005	Palomar	NEAT	·	990 m	MPC · JPL
596293	2005 PC	—	August 1, 2005	Campo Imperatore	CINEOS	·	1.2 km	MPC · JPL
596294	2005 PX_{5}	—	July 31, 2005	Palomar	NEAT	·	3.0 km	MPC · JPL
596295	2005 PD_{10}	—	August 4, 2005	Palomar	NEAT	H	380 m	MPC · JPL
596296	2005 PX_{12}	—	July 27, 2005	Palomar	NEAT	·	2.3 km	MPC · JPL
596297	2005 PQ_{18}	—	August 14, 2005	Pla D'Arguines	R. Ferrando, Ferrando, M.	·	600 m	MPC · JPL
596298	2005 QF_{3}	—	August 24, 2005	Palomar	NEAT	H	570 m	MPC · JPL
596299	2005 QQ_{40}	—	August 3, 2005	Palomar	NEAT	·	1.0 km	MPC · JPL
596300	2005 QL_{45}	—	August 28, 2005	Kitt Peak	Spacewatch	PHO	690 m	MPC · JPL

== 596301–596400 ==
back to top

Designation			Discovery			Properties		Ref
Permanent	Provisional	Named after	Date	Site	Discoverer(s)	Category	Diam.	Ref
596301	2005 QK_{47}	—	August 28, 2005	Kitt Peak	Spacewatch	·	950 m	MPC · JPL
596302	2005 QC_{60}	—	August 26, 2005	Campo Imperatore	CINEOS	H	470 m	MPC · JPL
596303	2005 QH_{96}	—	August 31, 2005	Kitt Peak	Spacewatch	MAS	590 m	MPC · JPL
596304	2005 QH_{99}	—	August 28, 2005	Anderson Mesa	LONEOS	·	760 m	MPC · JPL
596305	2005 QS_{103}	—	August 31, 2005	Kitt Peak	Spacewatch	·	1.8 km	MPC · JPL
596306	2005 QC_{111}	—	August 31, 2005	Kitt Peak	Spacewatch	·	3.4 km	MPC · JPL
596307	2005 QQ_{111}	—	August 30, 2005	Kitt Peak	Spacewatch	·	1.4 km	MPC · JPL
596308	2005 QE_{113}	—	August 28, 2005	Kitt Peak	Spacewatch	·	2.8 km	MPC · JPL
596309	2005 QN_{121}	—	August 28, 2005	Kitt Peak	Spacewatch	·	1.7 km	MPC · JPL
596310	2005 QS_{136}	—	August 28, 2005	Kitt Peak	Spacewatch	THM	1.7 km	MPC · JPL
596311	2005 QJ_{144}	—	July 11, 2005	Mount Lemmon	Mount Lemmon Survey	·	970 m	MPC · JPL
596312	2005 QE_{150}	—	August 27, 2005	Palomar	NEAT	·	3.1 km	MPC · JPL
596313	2005 QU_{151}	—	August 6, 2005	Palomar	NEAT	HYG	3.1 km	MPC · JPL
596314	2005 QM_{154}	—	August 27, 2005	Palomar	NEAT	·	960 m	MPC · JPL
596315	2005 QY_{171}	—	September 1, 2005	Kitt Peak	Spacewatch	PHO	780 m	MPC · JPL
596316	2005 QK_{189}	—	August 26, 2005	Palomar	NEAT	NAE	2.0 km	MPC · JPL
596317	2005 QN_{191}	—	August 31, 2005	Kitt Peak	Spacewatch	V	610 m	MPC · JPL
596318	2005 QQ_{191}	—	August 27, 2005	Palomar	NEAT	·	660 m	MPC · JPL
596319	2005 QS_{192}	—	August 31, 2005	Kitt Peak	Spacewatch	·	1.7 km	MPC · JPL
596320	2005 QT_{192}	—	August 30, 2005	Kitt Peak	Spacewatch	·	1.6 km	MPC · JPL
596321	2005 QF_{194}	—	August 30, 2005	Kitt Peak	Spacewatch	·	660 m	MPC · JPL
596322	2005 QU_{201}	—	August 29, 2016	Mount Lemmon	Mount Lemmon Survey	NYS	680 m	MPC · JPL
596323	2005 QB_{205}	—	August 28, 2005	Kitt Peak	Spacewatch	MAS	500 m	MPC · JPL
596324	2005 QY_{208}	—	August 31, 2005	Kitt Peak	Spacewatch	3:2 · SHU	3.9 km	MPC · JPL
596325	2005 RO_{12}	—	September 1, 2005	Kitt Peak	Spacewatch	·	1.6 km	MPC · JPL
596326	2005 RG_{29}	—	August 31, 2005	Palomar	NEAT	THB	2.9 km	MPC · JPL
596327	2005 RO_{46}	—	September 3, 2005	Apache Point	SDSS Collaboration	·	2.2 km	MPC · JPL
596328	2005 RM_{47}	—	September 26, 2005	Apache Point	SDSS Collaboration	·	1.5 km	MPC · JPL
596329	2005 RG_{52}	—	May 14, 2008	Kitt Peak	Spacewatch	·	890 m	MPC · JPL
596330	2005 RR_{53}	—	March 12, 2013	Palomar	Palomar Transient Factory	NAE	2.7 km	MPC · JPL
596331	2005 RY_{54}	—	November 17, 2011	Kitt Peak	Spacewatch	·	1.7 km	MPC · JPL
596332	2005 RO_{56}	—	October 25, 2011	Haleakala	Pan-STARRS 1	·	1.8 km	MPC · JPL
596333	2005 RL_{58}	—	February 13, 2008	Kitt Peak	Spacewatch	·	1.1 km	MPC · JPL
596334	2005 RL_{59}	—	September 13, 2005	Kitt Peak	Spacewatch	·	1.5 km	MPC · JPL
596335	2005 RC_{62}	—	September 13, 2005	Kitt Peak	Spacewatch	·	1.5 km	MPC · JPL
596336	2005 SJ_{25}	—	August 26, 2005	Palomar	NEAT	·	1.3 km	MPC · JPL
596337	2005 SH_{42}	—	September 24, 2005	Kitt Peak	Spacewatch	·	1.2 km	MPC · JPL
596338	2005 SW_{48}	—	September 24, 2005	Kitt Peak	Spacewatch	NYS	800 m	MPC · JPL
596339	2005 SL_{120}	—	September 29, 2005	Kitt Peak	Spacewatch	·	1.3 km	MPC · JPL
596340	2005 SC_{129}	—	September 29, 2005	Mount Lemmon	Mount Lemmon Survey	3:2	4.9 km	MPC · JPL
596341	2005 SU_{154}	—	September 26, 2005	Kitt Peak	Spacewatch	3:2	4.2 km	MPC · JPL
596342	2005 SS_{161}	—	September 27, 2005	Kitt Peak	Spacewatch	(29841)	1.1 km	MPC · JPL
596343	2005 SX_{174}	—	September 23, 2005	Kitt Peak	Spacewatch	·	480 m	MPC · JPL
596344	2005 SD_{177}	—	September 29, 2005	Kitt Peak	Spacewatch	EOS	2.0 km	MPC · JPL
596345	2005 SY_{181}	—	September 29, 2005	Kitt Peak	Spacewatch	·	2.5 km	MPC · JPL
596346	2005 ST_{188}	—	September 29, 2005	Mount Lemmon	Mount Lemmon Survey	·	1.3 km	MPC · JPL
596347	2005 SO_{189}	—	September 29, 2005	Mount Lemmon	Mount Lemmon Survey	·	2.1 km	MPC · JPL
596348	2005 SD_{196}	—	September 30, 2005	Kitt Peak	Spacewatch	·	1.5 km	MPC · JPL
596349	2005 SN_{202}	—	August 30, 2005	Kitt Peak	Spacewatch	·	1.1 km	MPC · JPL
596350	2005 SW_{211}	—	September 30, 2005	Mount Lemmon	Mount Lemmon Survey	·	1.0 km	MPC · JPL
596351	2005 SV_{215}	—	September 10, 2005	Anderson Mesa	LONEOS	·	780 m	MPC · JPL
596352	2005 SB_{225}	—	September 29, 2005	Kitt Peak	Spacewatch	PHO	860 m	MPC · JPL
596353	2005 SX_{227}	—	September 30, 2005	Kitt Peak	Spacewatch	·	2.6 km	MPC · JPL
596354	2005 SH_{235}	—	September 29, 2005	Mount Lemmon	Mount Lemmon Survey	·	2.2 km	MPC · JPL
596355	2005 SS_{237}	—	September 29, 2005	Kitt Peak	Spacewatch	·	790 m	MPC · JPL
596356	2005 SU_{238}	—	August 31, 2005	Kitt Peak	Spacewatch	NYS	450 m	MPC · JPL
596357	2005 SC_{240}	—	September 30, 2005	Kitt Peak	Spacewatch	·	1.9 km	MPC · JPL
596358	2005 SJ_{242}	—	May 23, 2001	Cerro Tololo	Deep Ecliptic Survey	·	1.3 km	MPC · JPL
596359	2005 SX_{257}	—	September 25, 2005	Kitt Peak	Spacewatch	·	1.2 km	MPC · JPL
596360	2005 SM_{266}	—	September 29, 2005	Kitt Peak	Spacewatch	HNS	1.2 km	MPC · JPL
596361	2005 SF_{268}	—	September 30, 2005	Palomar	NEAT	EOS	1.8 km	MPC · JPL
596362	2005 SH_{269}	—	September 1, 2005	Palomar	NEAT	·	4.4 km	MPC · JPL
596363	2005 SM_{269}	—	September 27, 2005	Kitt Peak	Spacewatch	·	600 m	MPC · JPL
596364	2005 SE_{271}	—	September 30, 2005	Kitt Peak	Spacewatch	·	2.0 km	MPC · JPL
596365	2005 SY_{274}	—	September 29, 2005	Mount Lemmon	Mount Lemmon Survey	·	550 m	MPC · JPL
596366	2005 SQ_{276}	—	September 29, 2005	Kitt Peak	Spacewatch	·	1.8 km	MPC · JPL
596367	2005 SV_{283}	—	September 13, 2005	Kitt Peak	Spacewatch	·	1.7 km	MPC · JPL
596368	2005 SL_{296}	—	September 29, 2005	Mount Lemmon	Mount Lemmon Survey	·	1.4 km	MPC · JPL
596369	2005 SW_{297}	—	August 10, 2015	Haleakala	Pan-STARRS 1	·	1.5 km	MPC · JPL
596370	2005 SE_{298}	—	September 30, 2005	Mauna Kea	A. Boattini	·	640 m	MPC · JPL
596371	2005 SO_{298}	—	January 13, 2018	Mount Lemmon	Mount Lemmon Survey	MAR	800 m	MPC · JPL
596372	2005 SB_{299}	—	April 29, 2014	Haleakala	Pan-STARRS 1	EOS	1.4 km	MPC · JPL
596373	2005 SL_{299}	—	September 30, 2005	Mount Lemmon	Mount Lemmon Survey	·	2.4 km	MPC · JPL
596374	2005 SC_{300}	—	August 4, 2013	Haleakala	Pan-STARRS 1	(5)	1.2 km	MPC · JPL
596375	2005 SG_{300}	—	September 12, 2015	Haleakala	Pan-STARRS 1	·	1.5 km	MPC · JPL
596376	2005 SL_{301}	—	September 30, 2005	Mount Lemmon	Mount Lemmon Survey	·	1.6 km	MPC · JPL
596377	2005 SV_{301}	—	September 30, 2005	Mount Lemmon	Mount Lemmon Survey	·	1.5 km	MPC · JPL
596378	2005 SC_{304}	—	September 30, 2005	Mount Lemmon	Mount Lemmon Survey	THM	1.4 km	MPC · JPL
596379	2005 TB_{1}	—	October 1, 2005	Catalina	CSS	EUN	1.1 km	MPC · JPL
596380	2005 TS_{11}	—	October 1, 2005	Mount Lemmon	Mount Lemmon Survey	·	1.8 km	MPC · JPL
596381	2005 TS_{32}	—	October 1, 2005	Kitt Peak	Spacewatch	EOS	1.3 km	MPC · JPL
596382	2005 TL_{34}	—	October 1, 2005	Kitt Peak	Spacewatch	NYS	840 m	MPC · JPL
596383	2005 TD_{36}	—	October 1, 2005	Kitt Peak	Spacewatch	·	1.5 km	MPC · JPL
596384	2005 TB_{58}	—	October 1, 2005	Mount Lemmon	Mount Lemmon Survey	KOR	1.1 km	MPC · JPL
596385	2005 TO_{87}	—	October 5, 2005	Kitt Peak	Spacewatch	3:2	2.9 km	MPC · JPL
596386	2005 TN_{115}	—	October 7, 2005	Kitt Peak	Spacewatch	·	1.9 km	MPC · JPL
596387	2005 TW_{123}	—	October 7, 2005	Mount Lemmon	Mount Lemmon Survey	NYS	680 m	MPC · JPL
596388	2005 TH_{128}	—	September 30, 2005	Kitt Peak	Spacewatch	·	790 m	MPC · JPL
596389	2005 TL_{142}	—	October 8, 2005	Kitt Peak	Spacewatch	EOS	1.4 km	MPC · JPL
596390	2005 TX_{143}	—	September 29, 2005	Kitt Peak	Spacewatch	·	1.6 km	MPC · JPL
596391	2005 TD_{150}	—	October 8, 2005	Kitt Peak	Spacewatch	3:2	4.3 km	MPC · JPL
596392	2005 TY_{153}	—	October 7, 2005	Mount Lemmon	Mount Lemmon Survey	·	2.0 km	MPC · JPL
596393	2005 TC_{154}	—	September 2, 2005	Palomar	NEAT	H	560 m	MPC · JPL
596394	2005 TH_{154}	—	September 30, 2005	Catalina	CSS	EUN	1.1 km	MPC · JPL
596395	2005 TX_{176}	—	August 31, 2005	Palomar	NEAT	·	1.4 km	MPC · JPL
596396	2005 TC_{187}	—	October 5, 2005	Kitt Peak	Spacewatch	H	350 m	MPC · JPL
596397	2005 TJ_{191}	—	October 1, 2005	Mount Lemmon	Mount Lemmon Survey	·	2.6 km	MPC · JPL
596398	2005 TW_{192}	—	September 30, 2005	Mount Lemmon	Mount Lemmon Survey	critical	390 m	MPC · JPL
596399	2005 TX_{199}	—	October 13, 2005	Mount Lemmon	Mount Lemmon Survey	V	670 m	MPC · JPL
596400	2005 TH_{200}	—	October 11, 2005	Kitt Peak	Spacewatch	·	2.1 km	MPC · JPL

== 596401–596500 ==
back to top

Designation			Discovery			Properties		Ref
Permanent	Provisional	Named after	Date	Site	Discoverer(s)	Category	Diam.	Ref
596401	2005 TX_{200}	—	March 28, 2008	Mount Lemmon	Mount Lemmon Survey	·	1.6 km	MPC · JPL
596402	2005 TN_{202}	—	April 4, 2014	Haleakala	Pan-STARRS 1	·	1.8 km	MPC · JPL
596403	2005 TE_{204}	—	October 1, 2005	Mount Lemmon	Mount Lemmon Survey	H	320 m	MPC · JPL
596404	2005 TS_{204}	—	September 26, 2000	Kitt Peak	Spacewatch	·	1.3 km	MPC · JPL
596405	2005 TQ_{205}	—	February 17, 2013	Kitt Peak	Spacewatch	·	1.8 km	MPC · JPL
596406	2005 TQ_{206}	—	October 1, 2010	Mount Lemmon	Mount Lemmon Survey	EOS	1.5 km	MPC · JPL
596407	2005 TV_{208}	—	October 1, 2005	Mount Lemmon	Mount Lemmon Survey	·	1.1 km	MPC · JPL
596408	2005 TP_{209}	—	October 1, 2005	Kitt Peak	Spacewatch	·	1.6 km	MPC · JPL
596409	2005 TR_{209}	—	October 28, 2011	Mount Lemmon	Mount Lemmon Survey	EOS	1.5 km	MPC · JPL
596410	2005 TS_{209}	—	June 24, 2014	Haleakala	Pan-STARRS 1	·	1.6 km	MPC · JPL
596411	2005 TY_{209}	—	October 2, 2005	Mount Lemmon	Mount Lemmon Survey	3:2	4.5 km	MPC · JPL
596412	2005 TD_{210}	—	October 10, 2005	Kitt Peak	Spacewatch	EOS	1.5 km	MPC · JPL
596413	2005 TE_{210}	—	October 2, 2013	Haleakala	Pan-STARRS 1	3:2	4.0 km	MPC · JPL
596414	2005 TE_{214}	—	October 5, 2005	Kitt Peak	Spacewatch	H	370 m	MPC · JPL
596415	2005 TE_{215}	—	October 1, 2005	Mount Lemmon	Mount Lemmon Survey	T_{j} (2.98) · 3:2	3.3 km	MPC · JPL
596416	2005 TB_{216}	—	October 6, 2005	Mount Lemmon	Mount Lemmon Survey	3:2	5.3 km	MPC · JPL
596417	2005 TJ_{218}	—	October 1, 2005	Kitt Peak	Spacewatch	3:2	4.7 km	MPC · JPL
596418	2005 TH_{219}	—	October 1, 2005	Mount Lemmon	Mount Lemmon Survey	·	1.4 km	MPC · JPL
596419	2005 TP_{219}	—	October 4, 2005	Mount Lemmon	Mount Lemmon Survey	·	1.3 km	MPC · JPL
596420	2005 TA_{221}	—	October 10, 2005	Kitt Peak	Spacewatch	EOS	1.3 km	MPC · JPL
596421	2005 UB_{15}	—	October 22, 2005	Kitt Peak	Spacewatch	·	840 m	MPC · JPL
596422	2005 UC_{16}	—	October 22, 2005	Kitt Peak	Spacewatch	·	1.9 km	MPC · JPL
596423	2005 UX_{23}	—	October 23, 2005	Kitt Peak	Spacewatch	EOS	1.7 km	MPC · JPL
596424	2005 UU_{33}	—	October 24, 2005	Kitt Peak	Spacewatch	THM	2.4 km	MPC · JPL
596425	2005 UV_{62}	—	October 25, 2005	Mount Lemmon	Mount Lemmon Survey	·	1.1 km	MPC · JPL
596426	2005 UB_{88}	—	October 22, 2005	Kitt Peak	Spacewatch	EOS	1.7 km	MPC · JPL
596427	2005 UA_{100}	—	October 22, 2005	Kitt Peak	Spacewatch	·	2.7 km	MPC · JPL
596428	2005 UZ_{117}	—	October 24, 2005	Kitt Peak	Spacewatch	·	690 m	MPC · JPL
596429	2005 UH_{124}	—	October 24, 2005	Kitt Peak	Spacewatch	H	370 m	MPC · JPL
596430	2005 UU_{124}	—	October 24, 2005	Kitt Peak	Spacewatch	·	530 m	MPC · JPL
596431	2005 UP_{126}	—	October 24, 2005	Kitt Peak	Spacewatch	·	2.4 km	MPC · JPL
596432	2005 UO_{144}	—	October 26, 2005	Kitt Peak	Spacewatch	·	1.9 km	MPC · JPL
596433	2005 UM_{145}	—	October 26, 2005	Kitt Peak	Spacewatch	·	430 m	MPC · JPL
596434	2005 UY_{155}	—	October 26, 2005	Palomar	NEAT	·	3.9 km	MPC · JPL
596435	2005 UV_{165}	—	October 24, 2005	Kitt Peak	Spacewatch	·	1.2 km	MPC · JPL
596436	2005 UP_{175}	—	October 24, 2005	Kitt Peak	Spacewatch	·	960 m	MPC · JPL
596437	2005 UD_{191}	—	October 1, 2005	Mount Lemmon	Mount Lemmon Survey	·	1.3 km	MPC · JPL
596438	2005 UK_{207}	—	October 27, 2005	Kitt Peak	Spacewatch	·	1.8 km	MPC · JPL
596439	2005 UN_{207}	—	October 27, 2005	Kitt Peak	Spacewatch	·	1.9 km	MPC · JPL
596440	2005 UV_{224}	—	October 25, 2005	Kitt Peak	Spacewatch	·	580 m	MPC · JPL
596441	2005 UF_{227}	—	October 25, 2005	Kitt Peak	Spacewatch	·	750 m	MPC · JPL
596442	2005 UW_{235}	—	October 25, 2005	Kitt Peak	Spacewatch	·	1.1 km	MPC · JPL
596443	2005 UN_{238}	—	October 25, 2005	Kitt Peak	Spacewatch	·	1.4 km	MPC · JPL
596444	2005 UU_{246}	—	October 28, 2005	Mount Lemmon	Mount Lemmon Survey	·	2.2 km	MPC · JPL
596445	2005 UK_{247}	—	October 28, 2005	Mount Lemmon	Mount Lemmon Survey	3:2	5.2 km	MPC · JPL
596446	2005 UR_{259}	—	October 25, 2005	Kitt Peak	Spacewatch	·	1.2 km	MPC · JPL
596447	2005 UM_{275}	—	October 25, 2005	Kitt Peak	Spacewatch	H	350 m	MPC · JPL
596448	2005 UE_{279}	—	October 23, 2001	Kitt Peak	Spacewatch	·	670 m	MPC · JPL
596449	2005 UB_{281}	—	October 25, 2005	Kitt Peak	Spacewatch	H	350 m	MPC · JPL
596450	2005 UR_{285}	—	October 26, 2005	Kitt Peak	Spacewatch	·	1.5 km	MPC · JPL
596451	2005 UX_{290}	—	October 26, 2005	Kitt Peak	Spacewatch	·	960 m	MPC · JPL
596452	2005 UM_{296}	—	October 26, 2005	Kitt Peak	Spacewatch	·	2.1 km	MPC · JPL
596453	2005 UA_{302}	—	October 26, 2005	Kitt Peak	Spacewatch	(5)	970 m	MPC · JPL
596454	2005 UA_{306}	—	October 1, 2005	Mount Lemmon	Mount Lemmon Survey	·	1.5 km	MPC · JPL
596455	2005 UY_{311}	—	October 22, 2005	Kitt Peak	Spacewatch	·	1.7 km	MPC · JPL
596456	2005 UA_{313}	—	October 29, 2005	Catalina	CSS	HNS	1.3 km	MPC · JPL
596457	2005 UA_{326}	—	October 29, 2005	Mount Lemmon	Mount Lemmon Survey	·	680 m	MPC · JPL
596458	2005 UP_{327}	—	October 29, 2005	Mount Lemmon	Mount Lemmon Survey	DOR	2.6 km	MPC · JPL
596459	2005 UD_{341}	—	October 31, 2005	Kitt Peak	Spacewatch	T_{j} (2.93)	5.2 km	MPC · JPL
596460	2005 UA_{360}	—	October 25, 2005	Kitt Peak	Spacewatch	·	1.9 km	MPC · JPL
596461	2005 UH_{375}	—	October 27, 2005	Kitt Peak	Spacewatch	·	760 m	MPC · JPL
596462	2005 UE_{385}	—	October 22, 2005	Kitt Peak	Spacewatch	·	870 m	MPC · JPL
596463	2005 UF_{390}	—	October 29, 2005	Mount Lemmon	Mount Lemmon Survey	·	1.9 km	MPC · JPL
596464	2005 UA_{407}	—	October 30, 2005	Mount Lemmon	Mount Lemmon Survey	EOS	1.5 km	MPC · JPL
596465	2005 UL_{408}	—	October 31, 2005	Mount Lemmon	Mount Lemmon Survey	NYS	750 m	MPC · JPL
596466	2005 UT_{413}	—	October 25, 2005	Kitt Peak	Spacewatch	EOS	1.6 km	MPC · JPL
596467	2005 UL_{416}	—	October 25, 2005	Kitt Peak	Spacewatch	·	2.2 km	MPC · JPL
596468	2005 UT_{422}	—	October 27, 2005	Mount Lemmon	Mount Lemmon Survey	·	1.9 km	MPC · JPL
596469	2005 UH_{435}	—	October 29, 2005	Mount Lemmon	Mount Lemmon Survey	KOR	1.1 km	MPC · JPL
596470	2005 UT_{435}	—	October 29, 2005	Mount Lemmon	Mount Lemmon Survey	·	1.2 km	MPC · JPL
596471	2005 UW_{465}	—	October 30, 2005	Kitt Peak	Spacewatch	·	1.5 km	MPC · JPL
596472	2005 UA_{466}	—	October 30, 2005	Kitt Peak	Spacewatch	·	1.9 km	MPC · JPL
596473	2005 UM_{468}	—	October 30, 2005	Kitt Peak	Spacewatch	·	550 m	MPC · JPL
596474	2005 US_{478}	—	October 27, 2005	Mount Lemmon	Mount Lemmon Survey	·	1.2 km	MPC · JPL
596475	2005 UK_{492}	—	October 24, 2005	Palomar	NEAT	·	2.9 km	MPC · JPL
596476	2005 UJ_{496}	—	October 26, 2005	Palomar	NEAT	·	1.1 km	MPC · JPL
596477	2005 UK_{505}	—	October 24, 2005	Mauna Kea	A. Boattini	·	1.6 km	MPC · JPL
596478	2005 UO_{515}	—	October 25, 2005	Apache Point	SDSS Collaboration	JUN	730 m	MPC · JPL
596479	2005 UN_{517}	—	October 25, 2005	Apache Point	SDSS Collaboration	·	1.6 km	MPC · JPL
596480	2005 UL_{521}	—	October 27, 2005	Apache Point	SDSS Collaboration	·	1.2 km	MPC · JPL
596481	2005 UW_{521}	—	October 30, 2005	Apache Point	SDSS Collaboration	·	1.5 km	MPC · JPL
596482	2005 UV_{525}	—	October 26, 2005	Kitt Peak	Spacewatch	TIR	2.4 km	MPC · JPL
596483	2005 UY_{527}	—	October 1, 2005	Mount Lemmon	Mount Lemmon Survey	·	1.5 km	MPC · JPL
596484	2005 UL_{532}	—	October 27, 2005	Kitt Peak	Spacewatch	3:2	4.0 km	MPC · JPL
596485	2005 UY_{533}	—	October 25, 2005	Mount Lemmon	Mount Lemmon Survey	·	2.4 km	MPC · JPL
596486	2005 UE_{534}	—	October 27, 2005	Mount Lemmon	Mount Lemmon Survey	·	3.6 km	MPC · JPL
596487	2005 UR_{534}	—	October 28, 2016	Haleakala	Pan-STARRS 1	·	2.6 km	MPC · JPL
596488	2005 UG_{537}	—	May 12, 2012	Mount Lemmon	Mount Lemmon Survey	MAR	540 m	MPC · JPL
596489	2005 UF_{539}	—	October 25, 2005	Kitt Peak	Spacewatch	·	1.9 km	MPC · JPL
596490	2005 UG_{539}	—	April 11, 2003	Kitt Peak	Spacewatch	T_{j} (2.97) · 3:2	5.2 km	MPC · JPL
596491	2005 UM_{539}	—	October 28, 2005	Kitt Peak	Spacewatch	·	2.5 km	MPC · JPL
596492	2005 UP_{539}	—	October 25, 2005	Mount Lemmon	Mount Lemmon Survey	TIR	2.3 km	MPC · JPL
596493	2005 UY_{539}	—	September 23, 2015	Mount Lemmon	Mount Lemmon Survey	EMA	2.2 km	MPC · JPL
596494	2005 US_{541}	—	October 30, 2005	Mount Lemmon	Mount Lemmon Survey	·	2.5 km	MPC · JPL
596495	2005 UT_{543}	—	November 28, 2011	Mount Lemmon	Mount Lemmon Survey	·	2.2 km	MPC · JPL
596496	2005 UV_{543}	—	October 31, 2005	Kitt Peak	Spacewatch	·	2.0 km	MPC · JPL
596497	2005 UA_{544}	—	October 25, 2005	Kitt Peak	Spacewatch	·	1.8 km	MPC · JPL
596498	2005 UG_{547}	—	October 30, 2005	Kitt Peak	Spacewatch	·	2.0 km	MPC · JPL
596499	2005 US_{547}	—	October 25, 2005	Kitt Peak	Spacewatch	3:2	4.9 km	MPC · JPL
596500	2005 UT_{548}	—	October 26, 2005	Kitt Peak	Spacewatch	·	800 m	MPC · JPL

== 596501–596600 ==
back to top

Designation			Discovery			Properties		Ref
Permanent	Provisional	Named after	Date	Site	Discoverer(s)	Category	Diam.	Ref
596501	2005 UJ_{549}	—	October 1, 2005	Anderson Mesa	LONEOS	NYS	1.2 km	MPC · JPL
596502	2005 UL_{549}	—	October 28, 2005	Kitt Peak	Spacewatch	·	1.9 km	MPC · JPL
596503	2005 UT_{549}	—	October 26, 2005	Kitt Peak	Spacewatch	·	800 m	MPC · JPL
596504	2005 UT_{551}	—	February 15, 2010	Kitt Peak	Spacewatch	·	390 m	MPC · JPL
596505	2005 UC_{552}	—	October 28, 2005	Kitt Peak	Spacewatch	·	780 m	MPC · JPL
596506	2005 VA_{21}	—	October 22, 2005	Kitt Peak	Spacewatch	KOR	1.3 km	MPC · JPL
596507	2005 VG_{24}	—	October 27, 2005	Mount Lemmon	Mount Lemmon Survey	·	1.9 km	MPC · JPL
596508	2005 VR_{28}	—	October 28, 2005	Kitt Peak	Spacewatch	·	460 m	MPC · JPL
596509	2005 VD_{41}	—	November 4, 2005	Mount Lemmon	Mount Lemmon Survey	·	730 m	MPC · JPL
596510	2005 VQ_{46}	—	November 4, 2005	Mount Lemmon	Mount Lemmon Survey	·	2.4 km	MPC · JPL
596511	2005 VY_{46}	—	October 27, 2005	Mount Lemmon	Mount Lemmon Survey	·	1.8 km	MPC · JPL
596512	2005 VR_{53}	—	October 22, 2005	Kitt Peak	Spacewatch	·	2.3 km	MPC · JPL
596513	2005 VF_{86}	—	November 4, 2005	Mount Lemmon	Mount Lemmon Survey	·	1.0 km	MPC · JPL
596514	2005 VW_{86}	—	October 1, 2005	Mount Lemmon	Mount Lemmon Survey	·	900 m	MPC · JPL
596515	2005 VC_{128}	—	October 23, 2005	Apache Point	SDSS Collaboration	3:2 · SHU	4.1 km	MPC · JPL
596516	2005 VD_{131}	—	October 27, 2005	Apache Point	SDSS Collaboration	3:2 · (3561)	4.2 km	MPC · JPL
596517	2005 VS_{132}	—	October 30, 2005	Apache Point	SDSS Collaboration	·	2.3 km	MPC · JPL
596518	2005 VH_{135}	—	November 12, 2005	Kitt Peak	Spacewatch	·	1.8 km	MPC · JPL
596519	2005 VV_{138}	—	November 6, 2005	Mount Lemmon	Mount Lemmon Survey	·	2.8 km	MPC · JPL
596520	2005 VX_{138}	—	February 25, 2011	Mount Lemmon	Mount Lemmon Survey	MAS	690 m	MPC · JPL
596521	2005 VA_{139}	—	March 28, 2008	Kitt Peak	Spacewatch	·	2.6 km	MPC · JPL
596522	2005 VJ_{139}	—	November 3, 2005	Mount Lemmon	Mount Lemmon Survey	·	2.7 km	MPC · JPL
596523	2005 VM_{139}	—	September 25, 2008	Kitt Peak	Spacewatch	·	1.3 km	MPC · JPL
596524	2005 VL_{141}	—	October 9, 2010	Mount Lemmon	Mount Lemmon Survey	·	1.7 km	MPC · JPL
596525	2005 VQ_{141}	—	March 16, 2007	Kitt Peak	Spacewatch	·	1.2 km	MPC · JPL
596526	2005 VJ_{143}	—	April 12, 2008	Catalina	CSS	·	2.8 km	MPC · JPL
596527	2005 VN_{143}	—	November 1, 2005	Mount Lemmon	Mount Lemmon Survey	·	1.1 km	MPC · JPL
596528	2005 VE_{144}	—	November 3, 2005	Mount Lemmon	Mount Lemmon Survey	·	1.3 km	MPC · JPL
596529	2005 VS_{145}	—	June 13, 2008	Kitt Peak	Spacewatch	NYS	820 m	MPC · JPL
596530	2005 VN_{147}	—	November 7, 2005	Mauna Kea	A. Boattini	TIR	3.0 km	MPC · JPL
596531	2005 VG_{149}	—	October 11, 2012	Haleakala	Pan-STARRS 1	·	1.2 km	MPC · JPL
596532	2005 VL_{151}	—	November 5, 2005	Kitt Peak	Spacewatch	EOS	1.4 km	MPC · JPL
596533	2005 VM_{151}	—	November 10, 2005	Kitt Peak	Spacewatch	·	2.3 km	MPC · JPL
596534	2005 VD_{152}	—	November 3, 2005	Mount Lemmon	Mount Lemmon Survey	·	2.3 km	MPC · JPL
596535	2005 VG_{152}	—	November 6, 2005	Mount Lemmon	Mount Lemmon Survey	·	1.1 km	MPC · JPL
596536	2005 VO_{154}	—	November 1, 2005	Kitt Peak	Spacewatch	AGN	920 m	MPC · JPL
596537	2005 WJ_{7}	—	November 21, 2005	Kitt Peak	Spacewatch	EOS	1.5 km	MPC · JPL
596538	2005 WN_{12}	—	November 22, 2005	Kitt Peak	Spacewatch	·	2.0 km	MPC · JPL
596539	2005 WK_{30}	—	November 21, 2005	Kitt Peak	Spacewatch	EOS	1.8 km	MPC · JPL
596540	2005 WV_{34}	—	November 6, 2005	Mount Lemmon	Mount Lemmon Survey	·	1.5 km	MPC · JPL
596541	2005 WB_{45}	—	November 22, 2005	Kitt Peak	Spacewatch	·	810 m	MPC · JPL
596542	2005 WY_{49}	—	November 25, 2005	Mount Lemmon	Mount Lemmon Survey	·	1.2 km	MPC · JPL
596543 Ubu	2005 WK_{50}	Ubu	November 6, 2005	Nogales	J.-C. Merlin	·	1.4 km	MPC · JPL
596544	2005 WO_{52}	—	November 25, 2005	Mount Lemmon	Mount Lemmon Survey	·	1.8 km	MPC · JPL
596545	2005 WJ_{55}	—	November 26, 2005	Mount Lemmon	Mount Lemmon Survey	·	660 m	MPC · JPL
596546	2005 WW_{77}	—	November 25, 2005	Kitt Peak	Spacewatch	·	2.5 km	MPC · JPL
596547	2005 WW_{79}	—	November 25, 2005	Kitt Peak	Spacewatch	EOS	1.9 km	MPC · JPL
596548	2005 WA_{97}	—	November 26, 2005	Kitt Peak	Spacewatch	·	990 m	MPC · JPL
596549	2005 WO_{107}	—	November 25, 2005	Mount Lemmon	Mount Lemmon Survey	·	1.3 km	MPC · JPL
596550	2005 WY_{108}	—	October 26, 2005	Kitt Peak	Spacewatch	·	920 m	MPC · JPL
596551	2005 WD_{112}	—	November 30, 2005	Mount Lemmon	Mount Lemmon Survey	MAR	630 m	MPC · JPL
596552	2005 WM_{124}	—	October 12, 2005	Kitt Peak	Spacewatch	·	1.9 km	MPC · JPL
596553	2005 WH_{130}	—	November 25, 2005	Kitt Peak	Spacewatch	·	1.8 km	MPC · JPL
596554	2005 WP_{138}	—	November 26, 2005	Mount Lemmon	Mount Lemmon Survey	·	2.2 km	MPC · JPL
596555	2005 WG_{139}	—	November 26, 2005	Mount Lemmon	Mount Lemmon Survey	·	2.6 km	MPC · JPL
596556	2005 WW_{154}	—	November 29, 2005	Kitt Peak	Spacewatch	·	1.6 km	MPC · JPL
596557	2005 WH_{166}	—	November 29, 2005	Mount Lemmon	Mount Lemmon Survey	·	1.1 km	MPC · JPL
596558	2005 WC_{168}	—	August 29, 2001	Palomar	NEAT	·	780 m	MPC · JPL
596559	2005 WP_{169}	—	October 5, 2005	Kitt Peak	Spacewatch	·	2.1 km	MPC · JPL
596560	2005 WR_{198}	—	October 30, 2005	Mount Lemmon	Mount Lemmon Survey	·	2.3 km	MPC · JPL
596561	2005 WH_{199}	—	November 6, 2005	Mount Lemmon	Mount Lemmon Survey	EOS	2.3 km	MPC · JPL
596562	2005 WD_{201}	—	November 26, 2005	Kitt Peak	Spacewatch	·	2.9 km	MPC · JPL
596563	2005 WN_{201}	—	November 29, 2005	Kitt Peak	Spacewatch	EOS	1.6 km	MPC · JPL
596564	2005 WS_{212}	—	November 30, 2005	Mount Lemmon	Mount Lemmon Survey	LIX	3.2 km	MPC · JPL
596565	2005 WC_{213}	—	November 30, 2005	Kitt Peak	Spacewatch	VER	2.3 km	MPC · JPL
596566	2005 WG_{213}	—	November 30, 2005	Kitt Peak	Spacewatch	·	960 m	MPC · JPL
596567	2005 WJ_{213}	—	October 23, 2009	Mount Lemmon	Mount Lemmon Survey	·	820 m	MPC · JPL
596568	2005 WK_{213}	—	November 29, 2005	Kitt Peak	Spacewatch	·	550 m	MPC · JPL
596569	2005 WT_{213}	—	March 7, 2013	Kitt Peak	Spacewatch	THM	2.2 km	MPC · JPL
596570	2005 WZ_{214}	—	October 9, 2010	Mount Lemmon	Mount Lemmon Survey	·	2.7 km	MPC · JPL
596571	2005 WX_{215}	—	November 26, 2005	Mount Lemmon	Mount Lemmon Survey	·	2.1 km	MPC · JPL
596572	2005 WO_{216}	—	March 14, 2011	Mount Lemmon	Mount Lemmon Survey	·	840 m	MPC · JPL
596573	2005 WR_{216}	—	November 25, 2005	Kitt Peak	Spacewatch	·	2.0 km	MPC · JPL
596574	2005 WP_{217}	—	November 30, 2005	Kitt Peak	Spacewatch	EOS	1.9 km	MPC · JPL
596575	2005 WZ_{217}	—	November 25, 2005	Kitt Peak	Spacewatch	·	1.4 km	MPC · JPL
596576	2005 WN_{219}	—	November 25, 2005	Mount Lemmon	Mount Lemmon Survey	·	2.0 km	MPC · JPL
596577	2005 XY_{10}	—	December 1, 2005	Kitt Peak	Spacewatch	·	1.3 km	MPC · JPL
596578	2005 XT_{12}	—	October 28, 2005	Kitt Peak	Spacewatch	·	890 m	MPC · JPL
596579	2005 XG_{13}	—	December 1, 2005	Kitt Peak	Spacewatch	·	2.7 km	MPC · JPL
596580	2005 XP_{25}	—	November 1, 2005	Mount Lemmon	Mount Lemmon Survey	·	2.4 km	MPC · JPL
596581	2005 XY_{30}	—	December 1, 2005	Kitt Peak	Spacewatch	·	800 m	MPC · JPL
596582	2005 XE_{33}	—	December 4, 2005	Kitt Peak	Spacewatch	THM	1.7 km	MPC · JPL
596583	2005 XJ_{39}	—	October 28, 2005	Kitt Peak	Spacewatch	·	1.4 km	MPC · JPL
596584	2005 XH_{44}	—	December 2, 2005	Kitt Peak	Spacewatch	·	3.4 km	MPC · JPL
596585	2005 XA_{46}	—	December 2, 2005	Kitt Peak	Spacewatch	·	2.9 km	MPC · JPL
596586	2005 XP_{51}	—	November 10, 2005	Mount Lemmon	Mount Lemmon Survey	·	2.1 km	MPC · JPL
596587	2005 XH_{66}	—	November 27, 2005	Pla D'Arguines	R. Ferrando, Ferrando, M.	·	2.2 km	MPC · JPL
596588 Jamesliebert	2005 XN_{80}	Jamesliebert	November 29, 2005	Catalina	CSS	H	470 m	MPC · JPL
596589	2005 XH_{85}	—	December 2, 2005	Kitt Peak	Spacewatch	·	910 m	MPC · JPL
596590	2005 XH_{87}	—	December 10, 2005	Kitt Peak	Spacewatch	(5)	960 m	MPC · JPL
596591	2005 XO_{88}	—	December 6, 2005	Kitt Peak	Spacewatch	·	2.2 km	MPC · JPL
596592	2005 XJ_{93}	—	December 1, 2005	Kitt Peak	Wasserman, L. H., Millis, R. L.	EOS	1.2 km	MPC · JPL
596593	2005 XK_{96}	—	December 1, 2005	Kitt Peak	Wasserman, L. H., Millis, R. L.	·	1.7 km	MPC · JPL
596594	2005 XE_{102}	—	December 1, 2005	Kitt Peak	Wasserman, L. H., Millis, R. L.	·	2.3 km	MPC · JPL
596595	2005 XD_{104}	—	December 1, 2005	Kitt Peak	Wasserman, L. H., Millis, R. L.	·	1.1 km	MPC · JPL
596596	2005 XL_{108}	—	December 1, 2005	Kitt Peak	Wasserman, L. H., Millis, R. L.	·	420 m	MPC · JPL
596597	2005 XY_{111}	—	December 4, 2005	Mount Lemmon	Mount Lemmon Survey	·	1.9 km	MPC · JPL
596598	2005 XS_{113}	—	October 8, 2013	Kitt Peak	Spacewatch	·	920 m	MPC · JPL
596599	2005 XC_{117}	—	December 5, 2005	Kitt Peak	Spacewatch	EUP	3.8 km	MPC · JPL
596600	2005 XV_{118}	—	November 29, 2005	Kitt Peak	Spacewatch	·	500 m	MPC · JPL

== 596601–596700 ==
back to top

Designation			Discovery			Properties		Ref
Permanent	Provisional	Named after	Date	Site	Discoverer(s)	Category	Diam.	Ref
596601	2005 XG_{120}	—	December 1, 2005	Kitt Peak	Spacewatch	·	3.8 km	MPC · JPL
596602	2005 XF_{121}	—	November 25, 2005	Kitt Peak	Spacewatch	HNS	930 m	MPC · JPL
596603	2005 XJ_{121}	—	December 5, 2005	Mount Lemmon	Mount Lemmon Survey	VER	2.7 km	MPC · JPL
596604	2005 XJ_{125}	—	October 17, 2010	Mount Lemmon	Mount Lemmon Survey	·	2.8 km	MPC · JPL
596605	2005 XF_{126}	—	October 8, 2015	Mount Lemmon	Mount Lemmon Survey	·	2.5 km	MPC · JPL
596606	2005 XR_{127}	—	January 12, 2018	Mount Lemmon	Mount Lemmon Survey	·	2.4 km	MPC · JPL
596607	2005 XW_{127}	—	February 20, 2015	Haleakala	Pan-STARRS 1	KRM	1.9 km	MPC · JPL
596608	2005 XB_{128}	—	January 23, 2018	Mount Lemmon	Mount Lemmon Survey	·	2.3 km	MPC · JPL
596609	2005 XF_{128}	—	July 1, 2014	Haleakala	Pan-STARRS 1	·	2.3 km	MPC · JPL
596610	2005 XW_{128}	—	December 6, 2005	Kitt Peak	Spacewatch	·	1.4 km	MPC · JPL
596611	2005 XB_{129}	—	December 1, 2005	Kitt Peak	Spacewatch	·	2.6 km	MPC · JPL
596612	2005 XD_{129}	—	March 9, 2007	Kitt Peak	Spacewatch	·	850 m	MPC · JPL
596613	2005 XF_{129}	—	December 1, 2005	Kitt Peak	Wasserman, L. H., Millis, R. L.	EOS	1.4 km	MPC · JPL
596614	2005 XK_{129}	—	January 26, 2012	Mount Lemmon	Mount Lemmon Survey	·	3.0 km	MPC · JPL
596615	2005 XR_{130}	—	August 15, 2013	Haleakala	Pan-STARRS 1	·	1.2 km	MPC · JPL
596616	2005 XU_{132}	—	February 18, 2001	Haleakala	NEAT	TIR	3.3 km	MPC · JPL
596617	2005 YA_{6}	—	December 21, 2005	Kitt Peak	Spacewatch	·	2.2 km	MPC · JPL
596618	2005 YH_{10}	—	August 7, 2004	Palomar	NEAT	·	2.3 km	MPC · JPL
596619	2005 YC_{13}	—	December 22, 2005	Kitt Peak	Spacewatch	·	1.5 km	MPC · JPL
596620	2005 YC_{24}	—	December 24, 2005	Kitt Peak	Spacewatch	·	2.4 km	MPC · JPL
596621	2005 YY_{43}	—	December 25, 2005	Kitt Peak	Spacewatch	VER	1.9 km	MPC · JPL
596622	2005 YN_{44}	—	November 1, 2005	Mount Lemmon	Mount Lemmon Survey	·	2.2 km	MPC · JPL
596623	2005 YA_{66}	—	December 25, 2005	Kitt Peak	Spacewatch	·	1.8 km	MPC · JPL
596624	2005 YP_{68}	—	December 26, 2005	Kitt Peak	Spacewatch	(5)	860 m	MPC · JPL
596625	2005 YF_{75}	—	December 24, 2005	Kitt Peak	Spacewatch	·	3.2 km	MPC · JPL
596626	2005 YV_{85}	—	December 25, 2005	Mount Lemmon	Mount Lemmon Survey	·	480 m	MPC · JPL
596627	2005 YS_{89}	—	December 26, 2005	Mount Lemmon	Mount Lemmon Survey	·	2.5 km	MPC · JPL
596628	2005 YA_{95}	—	December 25, 2005	Kitt Peak	Spacewatch	MAR	1.1 km	MPC · JPL
596629	2005 YK_{100}	—	December 28, 2005	Kitt Peak	Spacewatch	·	900 m	MPC · JPL
596630	2005 YL_{108}	—	December 25, 2005	Kitt Peak	Spacewatch	(194)	1.5 km	MPC · JPL
596631	2005 YC_{109}	—	December 25, 2005	Kitt Peak	Spacewatch	EOS	1.7 km	MPC · JPL
596632	2005 YC_{112}	—	December 25, 2005	Mount Lemmon	Mount Lemmon Survey	VER	2.4 km	MPC · JPL
596633	2005 YG_{119}	—	December 26, 2005	Mount Lemmon	Mount Lemmon Survey	·	740 m	MPC · JPL
596634	2005 YX_{129}	—	December 24, 2005	Kitt Peak	Spacewatch	·	910 m	MPC · JPL
596635	2005 YF_{151}	—	December 25, 2005	Kitt Peak	Spacewatch	·	1.2 km	MPC · JPL
596636	2005 YE_{157}	—	December 27, 2005	Kitt Peak	Spacewatch	·	2.6 km	MPC · JPL
596637	2005 YK_{163}	—	December 27, 2005	Mount Lemmon	Mount Lemmon Survey	·	2.2 km	MPC · JPL
596638	2005 YD_{166}	—	December 26, 2005	Mount Lemmon	Mount Lemmon Survey	·	2.6 km	MPC · JPL
596639	2005 YJ_{181}	—	December 23, 2005	Pla D'Arguines	R. Ferrando, Ferrando, M.	·	2.8 km	MPC · JPL
596640	2005 YX_{182}	—	December 27, 2005	Kitt Peak	Spacewatch	AGN	1.0 km	MPC · JPL
596641	2005 YU_{183}	—	December 27, 2005	Kitt Peak	Spacewatch	·	1.9 km	MPC · JPL
596642	2005 YC_{185}	—	December 27, 2005	Mount Lemmon	Mount Lemmon Survey	·	1.6 km	MPC · JPL
596643	2005 YT_{187}	—	December 28, 2005	Kitt Peak	Spacewatch	THM	1.6 km	MPC · JPL
596644	2005 YE_{190}	—	December 30, 2005	Kitt Peak	Spacewatch	AGN	1.1 km	MPC · JPL
596645	2005 YM_{191}	—	December 6, 2005	Mount Lemmon	Mount Lemmon Survey	·	3.2 km	MPC · JPL
596646	2005 YO_{191}	—	December 1, 2005	Mount Lemmon	Mount Lemmon Survey	·	2.9 km	MPC · JPL
596647	2005 YJ_{192}	—	December 30, 2005	Kitt Peak	Spacewatch	·	1.3 km	MPC · JPL
596648	2005 YX_{224}	—	December 25, 2005	Kitt Peak	Spacewatch	·	1.1 km	MPC · JPL
596649	2005 YE_{228}	—	December 25, 2005	Kitt Peak	Spacewatch	·	670 m	MPC · JPL
596650	2005 YK_{234}	—	December 28, 2005	Mount Lemmon	Mount Lemmon Survey	·	1.5 km	MPC · JPL
596651	2005 YR_{242}	—	December 30, 2005	Kitt Peak	Spacewatch	·	1.4 km	MPC · JPL
596652	2005 YW_{243}	—	December 30, 2005	Kitt Peak	Spacewatch	(5)	830 m	MPC · JPL
596653	2005 YP_{245}	—	December 30, 2005	Kitt Peak	Spacewatch	·	1.4 km	MPC · JPL
596654	2005 YE_{249}	—	December 5, 2005	Kitt Peak	Spacewatch	TIR	2.4 km	MPC · JPL
596655	2005 YK_{253}	—	December 29, 2005	Kitt Peak	Spacewatch	·	900 m	MPC · JPL
596656	2005 YR_{255}	—	December 30, 2005	Kitt Peak	Spacewatch	·	2.8 km	MPC · JPL
596657	2005 YC_{273}	—	December 30, 2005	Kitt Peak	Spacewatch	·	1.2 km	MPC · JPL
596658	2005 YG_{284}	—	December 28, 2005	Mount Lemmon	Mount Lemmon Survey	·	460 m	MPC · JPL
596659	2005 YF_{295}	—	December 30, 2005	Kitt Peak	Spacewatch	·	1.1 km	MPC · JPL
596660	2005 YU_{295}	—	December 29, 2005	Mount Lemmon	Mount Lemmon Survey	·	530 m	MPC · JPL
596661	2005 YM_{296}	—	August 12, 2015	Haleakala	Pan-STARRS 1	·	2.3 km	MPC · JPL
596662	2005 YZ_{296}	—	December 22, 2005	Kitt Peak	Spacewatch	VER	2.1 km	MPC · JPL
596663	2005 YC_{297}	—	December 8, 2015	Haleakala	Pan-STARRS 1	·	1.9 km	MPC · JPL
596664	2005 YZ_{297}	—	February 17, 2018	Mount Lemmon	Mount Lemmon Survey	·	2.4 km	MPC · JPL
596665	2005 YK_{300}	—	December 25, 2005	Kitt Peak	Spacewatch	·	970 m	MPC · JPL
596666	2005 YL_{300}	—	December 27, 2005	Kitt Peak	Spacewatch	BRG	1.2 km	MPC · JPL
596667	2005 YW_{300}	—	December 29, 2005	Kitt Peak	Spacewatch	·	2.3 km	MPC · JPL
596668	2005 YX_{300}	—	December 30, 2005	Kitt Peak	Spacewatch	EUP	2.5 km	MPC · JPL
596669	2005 YC_{301}	—	December 27, 2005	Kitt Peak	Spacewatch	·	2.1 km	MPC · JPL
596670	2006 AG_{9}	—	January 4, 2006	Kitt Peak	Spacewatch	·	600 m	MPC · JPL
596671	2006 AZ_{11}	—	December 5, 2005	Mount Lemmon	Mount Lemmon Survey	·	1.3 km	MPC · JPL
596672	2006 AP_{24}	—	December 28, 2005	Mount Lemmon	Mount Lemmon Survey	(5)	870 m	MPC · JPL
596673	2006 AJ_{25}	—	April 6, 2003	Anderson Mesa	LONEOS	·	590 m	MPC · JPL
596674	2006 AG_{28}	—	January 6, 2006	Mount Lemmon	Mount Lemmon Survey	·	2.6 km	MPC · JPL
596675	2006 AC_{39}	—	January 7, 2006	Mount Lemmon	Mount Lemmon Survey	EUP	3.0 km	MPC · JPL
596676	2006 AU_{51}	—	December 25, 2005	Mount Lemmon	Mount Lemmon Survey	MAS	470 m	MPC · JPL
596677	2006 AC_{52}	—	January 5, 2006	Kitt Peak	Spacewatch	·	1.1 km	MPC · JPL
596678	2006 AM_{57}	—	December 27, 2005	Kitt Peak	Spacewatch	EUP	3.0 km	MPC · JPL
596679	2006 AM_{61}	—	December 28, 2005	Kitt Peak	Spacewatch	·	2.6 km	MPC · JPL
596680	2006 AN_{61}	—	September 19, 1995	Kitt Peak	Spacewatch	·	1.7 km	MPC · JPL
596681	2006 AT_{62}	—	January 6, 2006	Kitt Peak	Spacewatch	·	1 km	MPC · JPL
596682	2006 AU_{73}	—	January 8, 2006	Kitt Peak	Spacewatch	·	2.5 km	MPC · JPL
596683	2006 AM_{74}	—	January 6, 2006	Anderson Mesa	LONEOS	·	2.0 km	MPC · JPL
596684	2006 AN_{88}	—	January 14, 2002	Kitt Peak	Spacewatch	·	1.5 km	MPC · JPL
596685	2006 AR_{91}	—	January 7, 2006	Mount Lemmon	Mount Lemmon Survey	VER	2.3 km	MPC · JPL
596686	2006 AM_{92}	—	January 7, 2006	Mount Lemmon	Mount Lemmon Survey	·	780 m	MPC · JPL
596687 Patrickcôté	2006 AZ_{103}	Patrickcôté	January 7, 2006	Mauna Kea	P. A. Wiegert, D. D. Balam	·	3.1 km	MPC · JPL
596688	2006 AC_{109}	—	January 7, 2006	Kitt Peak	Spacewatch	(159)	2.1 km	MPC · JPL
596689	2006 AY_{109}	—	August 30, 2014	Haleakala	Pan-STARRS 1	·	1.6 km	MPC · JPL
596690	2006 AF_{111}	—	January 7, 2006	Kitt Peak	Spacewatch	·	1.8 km	MPC · JPL
596691	2006 AJ_{111}	—	December 14, 2010	Mount Lemmon	Mount Lemmon Survey	·	3.3 km	MPC · JPL
596692	2006 AO_{111}	—	January 5, 2006	Kitt Peak	Spacewatch	VER	2.2 km	MPC · JPL
596693	2006 AC_{112}	—	January 5, 2006	Mount Lemmon	Mount Lemmon Survey	HNS	1.2 km	MPC · JPL
596694	2006 BP_{9}	—	January 22, 2006	Anderson Mesa	LONEOS	·	1.6 km	MPC · JPL
596695	2006 BP_{15}	—	January 22, 2006	Mount Lemmon	Mount Lemmon Survey	·	670 m	MPC · JPL
596696	2006 BD_{36}	—	January 10, 2006	Mount Lemmon	Mount Lemmon Survey	·	690 m	MPC · JPL
596697	2006 BV_{41}	—	January 22, 2006	Mount Lemmon	Mount Lemmon Survey	·	1.6 km	MPC · JPL
596698	2006 BS_{48}	—	January 8, 2006	Kitt Peak	Spacewatch	EOS	1.7 km	MPC · JPL
596699	2006 BS_{63}	—	January 22, 2006	Mount Lemmon	Mount Lemmon Survey	·	3.2 km	MPC · JPL
596700	2006 BW_{63}	—	January 22, 2006	Mount Lemmon	Mount Lemmon Survey	·	990 m	MPC · JPL

== 596701–596800 ==
back to top

Designation			Discovery			Properties		Ref
Permanent	Provisional	Named after	Date	Site	Discoverer(s)	Category	Diam.	Ref
596701	2006 BG_{66}	—	January 23, 2006	Kitt Peak	Spacewatch	·	2.3 km	MPC · JPL
596702	2006 BO_{66}	—	January 23, 2006	Kitt Peak	Spacewatch	·	2.2 km	MPC · JPL
596703	2006 BE_{69}	—	January 23, 2006	Kitt Peak	Spacewatch	·	2.3 km	MPC · JPL
596704	2006 BD_{78}	—	January 23, 2006	Mount Lemmon	Mount Lemmon Survey	VER	2.0 km	MPC · JPL
596705	2006 BG_{94}	—	January 26, 2006	Kitt Peak	Spacewatch	·	2.1 km	MPC · JPL
596706	2006 BD_{112}	—	October 24, 2005	Mauna Kea	A. Boattini	·	4.7 km	MPC · JPL
596707	2006 BD_{117}	—	January 26, 2006	Kitt Peak	Spacewatch	L5	7.2 km	MPC · JPL
596708	2006 BP_{117}	—	January 7, 2006	Kitt Peak	Spacewatch	·	2.7 km	MPC · JPL
596709	2006 BX_{128}	—	January 26, 2006	Mount Lemmon	Mount Lemmon Survey	·	2.4 km	MPC · JPL
596710	2006 BG_{135}	—	January 27, 2006	Mount Lemmon	Mount Lemmon Survey	·	580 m	MPC · JPL
596711	2006 BX_{142}	—	April 8, 2003	Kitt Peak	Spacewatch	·	700 m	MPC · JPL
596712	2006 BF_{152}	—	January 25, 2006	Kitt Peak	Spacewatch	·	1.3 km	MPC · JPL
596713	2006 BX_{154}	—	January 25, 2006	Kitt Peak	Spacewatch	·	1.4 km	MPC · JPL
596714	2006 BU_{170}	—	January 27, 2006	Kitt Peak	Spacewatch	·	1.7 km	MPC · JPL
596715	2006 BE_{171}	—	January 8, 2006	Mount Lemmon	Mount Lemmon Survey	·	2.6 km	MPC · JPL
596716	2006 BD_{173}	—	January 27, 2006	Kitt Peak	Spacewatch	·	2.4 km	MPC · JPL
596717	2006 BQ_{174}	—	January 27, 2006	Kitt Peak	Spacewatch	·	1.1 km	MPC · JPL
596718	2006 BN_{181}	—	March 5, 2002	Kitt Peak	Spacewatch	·	1.1 km	MPC · JPL
596719	2006 BG_{186}	—	January 28, 2006	Mount Lemmon	Mount Lemmon Survey	·	560 m	MPC · JPL
596720	2006 BU_{190}	—	November 7, 2005	Mauna Kea	A. Boattini	·	560 m	MPC · JPL
596721	2006 BG_{193}	—	January 30, 2006	Kitt Peak	Spacewatch	HNS	740 m	MPC · JPL
596722	2006 BH_{196}	—	January 30, 2006	Kitt Peak	Spacewatch	·	1.1 km	MPC · JPL
596723	2006 BA_{199}	—	January 30, 2006	Kitt Peak	Spacewatch	·	630 m	MPC · JPL
596724	2006 BC_{202}	—	January 31, 2006	Kitt Peak	Spacewatch	·	1.7 km	MPC · JPL
596725	2006 BG_{204}	—	January 31, 2006	Kitt Peak	Spacewatch	(194)	1.6 km	MPC · JPL
596726	2006 BN_{207}	—	January 5, 2006	Mount Lemmon	Mount Lemmon Survey	ADE	1.9 km	MPC · JPL
596727	2006 BY_{208}	—	January 31, 2006	Mount Lemmon	Mount Lemmon Survey	·	1.7 km	MPC · JPL
596728	2006 BT_{210}	—	January 31, 2006	Mount Lemmon	Mount Lemmon Survey	·	1.5 km	MPC · JPL
596729	2006 BX_{218}	—	January 28, 2006	Mount Lemmon	Mount Lemmon Survey	·	1.7 km	MPC · JPL
596730	2006 BJ_{225}	—	January 30, 2006	Kitt Peak	Spacewatch	·	2.3 km	MPC · JPL
596731	2006 BO_{233}	—	January 31, 2006	Kitt Peak	Spacewatch	KOR	1.1 km	MPC · JPL
596732	2006 BY_{235}	—	August 21, 2004	Siding Spring	SSS	·	1.4 km	MPC · JPL
596733	2006 BK_{236}	—	January 31, 2006	Kitt Peak	Spacewatch	·	1.2 km	MPC · JPL
596734	2006 BK_{237}	—	January 31, 2006	Kitt Peak	Spacewatch	·	1.6 km	MPC · JPL
596735	2006 BD_{238}	—	January 23, 2006	Kitt Peak	Spacewatch	·	2.8 km	MPC · JPL
596736	2006 BR_{239}	—	January 31, 2006	Kitt Peak	Spacewatch	·	1.3 km	MPC · JPL
596737	2006 BU_{252}	—	January 31, 2006	Kitt Peak	Spacewatch	·	2.9 km	MPC · JPL
596738	2006 BR_{259}	—	November 7, 2005	Mauna Kea	A. Boattini	·	1.2 km	MPC · JPL
596739	2006 BA_{265}	—	January 31, 2006	Kitt Peak	Spacewatch	·	2.2 km	MPC · JPL
596740	2006 BK_{280}	—	January 23, 2006	Kitt Peak	Spacewatch	EOS	1.9 km	MPC · JPL
596741	2006 BM_{287}	—	January 23, 2006	Kitt Peak	Spacewatch	MAR	850 m	MPC · JPL
596742	2006 BK_{288}	—	January 31, 2006	Kitt Peak	Spacewatch	EUN	1.1 km	MPC · JPL
596743	2006 BV_{290}	—	January 30, 2006	Kitt Peak	Spacewatch	·	990 m	MPC · JPL
596744	2006 BM_{291}	—	April 18, 2015	Haleakala	Pan-STARRS 1	·	1.2 km	MPC · JPL
596745	2006 BK_{292}	—	December 28, 2011	Mount Lemmon	Mount Lemmon Survey	·	2.6 km	MPC · JPL
596746	2006 BL_{292}	—	July 25, 2015	Haleakala	Pan-STARRS 1	·	2.4 km	MPC · JPL
596747	2006 BU_{293}	—	January 31, 2006	Kitt Peak	Spacewatch	·	470 m	MPC · JPL
596748	2006 BR_{297}	—	September 26, 2003	Apache Point	SDSS Collaboration	·	2.4 km	MPC · JPL
596749	2006 BU_{297}	—	January 30, 2006	Kitt Peak	Spacewatch	·	590 m	MPC · JPL
596750	2006 BP_{298}	—	January 23, 2006	Mount Lemmon	Mount Lemmon Survey	·	2.3 km	MPC · JPL
596751	2006 BK_{301}	—	January 21, 2006	Mount Lemmon	Mount Lemmon Survey	EOS	1.4 km	MPC · JPL
596752	2006 CO_{4}	—	February 1, 2006	Mount Lemmon	Mount Lemmon Survey	·	2.7 km	MPC · JPL
596753	2006 CN_{6}	—	February 1, 2006	Mount Lemmon	Mount Lemmon Survey	EOS	2.0 km	MPC · JPL
596754	2006 CA_{13}	—	February 1, 2006	Kitt Peak	Spacewatch	·	3.8 km	MPC · JPL
596755	2006 CR_{19}	—	February 1, 2006	Mount Lemmon	Mount Lemmon Survey	·	1.0 km	MPC · JPL
596756	2006 CH_{20}	—	February 1, 2006	Mount Lemmon	Mount Lemmon Survey	MIS	2.4 km	MPC · JPL
596757	2006 CN_{21}	—	February 1, 2006	Mount Lemmon	Mount Lemmon Survey	·	2.8 km	MPC · JPL
596758	2006 CF_{24}	—	January 22, 2006	Mount Lemmon	Mount Lemmon Survey	THM	1.6 km	MPC · JPL
596759	2006 CS_{38}	—	February 2, 2006	Kitt Peak	Spacewatch	·	1.2 km	MPC · JPL
596760	2006 CT_{43}	—	February 2, 2006	Mount Lemmon	Mount Lemmon Survey	MAR	1.2 km	MPC · JPL
596761	2006 CZ_{46}	—	January 30, 2006	Kitt Peak	Spacewatch	·	1.8 km	MPC · JPL
596762	2006 CU_{51}	—	February 4, 2006	Kitt Peak	Spacewatch	·	560 m	MPC · JPL
596763	2006 CX_{51}	—	February 4, 2006	Kitt Peak	Spacewatch	·	1.0 km	MPC · JPL
596764	2006 CY_{54}	—	January 30, 2006	Kitt Peak	Spacewatch	EUN	770 m	MPC · JPL
596765	2006 CV_{63}	—	February 2, 2006	Mauna Kea	P. A. Wiegert	·	2.4 km	MPC · JPL
596766	2006 CM_{66}	—	September 18, 2010	Mount Lemmon	Mount Lemmon Survey	H	440 m	MPC · JPL
596767	2006 CH_{79}	—	August 21, 2012	Črni Vrh	Mikuž, H.	EUN	1.1 km	MPC · JPL
596768	2006 CE_{82}	—	November 29, 2013	Haleakala	Pan-STARRS 1	·	1.0 km	MPC · JPL
596769	2006 CZ_{82}	—	July 3, 2014	Haleakala	Pan-STARRS 1	·	2.4 km	MPC · JPL
596770	2006 CB_{83}	—	October 10, 2016	Mount Lemmon	Mount Lemmon Survey	·	1.5 km	MPC · JPL
596771	2006 CF_{83}	—	March 19, 2013	Haleakala	Pan-STARRS 1	·	440 m	MPC · JPL
596772	2006 CR_{83}	—	December 27, 2014	Haleakala	Pan-STARRS 1	HNS	950 m	MPC · JPL
596773	2006 CX_{83}	—	March 5, 2016	Haleakala	Pan-STARRS 1	·	1.9 km	MPC · JPL
596774	2006 CL_{84}	—	May 31, 2013	Haleakala	Pan-STARRS 1	·	3.2 km	MPC · JPL
596775	2006 CU_{85}	—	February 4, 2006	Kitt Peak	Spacewatch	·	1.1 km	MPC · JPL
596776	2006 CW_{85}	—	September 17, 2017	Haleakala	Pan-STARRS 1	HNS	1.1 km	MPC · JPL
596777	2006 CD_{86}	—	February 1, 2006	Kitt Peak	Spacewatch	·	2.3 km	MPC · JPL
596778	2006 CW_{86}	—	July 4, 2016	Haleakala	Pan-STARRS 1	·	1.6 km	MPC · JPL
596779	2006 CE_{88}	—	June 7, 2013	Haleakala	Pan-STARRS 1	·	2.5 km	MPC · JPL
596780	2006 CD_{89}	—	February 1, 2006	Kitt Peak	Spacewatch	·	1.2 km	MPC · JPL
596781	2006 CE_{89}	—	January 30, 2006	Catalina	CSS	·	1.7 km	MPC · JPL
596782	2006 DR	—	February 20, 2006	Marly	P. Kocher	H	550 m	MPC · JPL
596783	2006 DU_{25}	—	February 20, 2006	Kitt Peak	Spacewatch	·	1.2 km	MPC · JPL
596784	2006 DJ_{28}	—	December 2, 2005	Kitt Peak	Wasserman, L. H., Millis, R. L.	·	500 m	MPC · JPL
596785	2006 DR_{67}	—	February 23, 2006	Anderson Mesa	LONEOS	BRG	1.5 km	MPC · JPL
596786	2006 DQ_{73}	—	January 31, 2006	Kitt Peak	Spacewatch	·	660 m	MPC · JPL
596787	2006 DH_{75}	—	February 20, 2006	Kitt Peak	Spacewatch	·	1.8 km	MPC · JPL
596788	2006 DB_{77}	—	February 2, 2006	Mount Lemmon	Mount Lemmon Survey	·	1.2 km	MPC · JPL
596789	2006 DS_{77}	—	February 24, 2006	Kitt Peak	Spacewatch	·	480 m	MPC · JPL
596790	2006 DX_{77}	—	January 26, 2006	Kitt Peak	Spacewatch	(1547)	1.2 km	MPC · JPL
596791	2006 DA_{81}	—	December 3, 2005	Mauna Kea	A. Boattini	L5	10 km	MPC · JPL
596792	2006 DL_{81}	—	February 24, 2006	Kitt Peak	Spacewatch	MAR	1.0 km	MPC · JPL
596793	2006 DB_{104}	—	February 25, 2006	Mount Lemmon	Mount Lemmon Survey	·	2.5 km	MPC · JPL
596794	2006 DM_{105}	—	February 25, 2006	Mount Lemmon	Mount Lemmon Survey	·	1.1 km	MPC · JPL
596795	2006 DH_{108}	—	February 25, 2006	Kitt Peak	Spacewatch	·	600 m	MPC · JPL
596796	2006 DX_{116}	—	February 27, 2006	Catalina	CSS	L5	10 km	MPC · JPL
596797	2006 DX_{118}	—	February 25, 2006	Kitt Peak	Spacewatch	·	1.2 km	MPC · JPL
596798	2006 DE_{123}	—	February 24, 2006	Kitt Peak	Spacewatch	·	1.1 km	MPC · JPL
596799	2006 DH_{131}	—	February 25, 2006	Kitt Peak	Spacewatch	·	510 m	MPC · JPL
596800	2006 DU_{135}	—	February 25, 2006	Mount Lemmon	Mount Lemmon Survey	EOS	1.5 km	MPC · JPL

== 596801–596900 ==
back to top

Designation			Discovery			Properties		Ref
Permanent	Provisional	Named after	Date	Site	Discoverer(s)	Category	Diam.	Ref
596801	2006 DZ_{141}	—	February 25, 2006	Kitt Peak	Spacewatch	L5	7.0 km	MPC · JPL
596802	2006 DC_{147}	—	December 3, 2005	Mauna Kea	A. Boattini	HOF	2.2 km	MPC · JPL
596803	2006 DA_{149}	—	February 25, 2006	Kitt Peak	Spacewatch	·	1.2 km	MPC · JPL
596804	2006 DB_{149}	—	February 25, 2006	Mount Lemmon	Mount Lemmon Survey	EUN	780 m	MPC · JPL
596805	2006 DE_{149}	—	February 25, 2006	Kitt Peak	Spacewatch	·	1.9 km	MPC · JPL
596806	2006 DX_{160}	—	February 27, 2006	Kitt Peak	Spacewatch	·	1.2 km	MPC · JPL
596807	2006 DO_{168}	—	February 27, 2006	Kitt Peak	Spacewatch	·	2.7 km	MPC · JPL
596808	2006 DC_{170}	—	February 27, 2006	Kitt Peak	Spacewatch	MAR	1.2 km	MPC · JPL
596809	2006 DV_{172}	—	February 27, 2006	Kitt Peak	Spacewatch	·	1.6 km	MPC · JPL
596810	2006 DU_{176}	—	February 27, 2006	Mount Lemmon	Mount Lemmon Survey	·	1.2 km	MPC · JPL
596811	2006 DM_{183}	—	February 27, 2006	Kitt Peak	Spacewatch	·	1.6 km	MPC · JPL
596812	2006 DZ_{186}	—	February 27, 2006	Kitt Peak	Spacewatch	·	610 m	MPC · JPL
596813	2006 DA_{192}	—	February 27, 2006	Kitt Peak	Spacewatch	·	2.9 km	MPC · JPL
596814	2006 DM_{194}	—	February 20, 2006	Kitt Peak	Spacewatch	·	2.6 km	MPC · JPL
596815	2006 DY_{208}	—	February 27, 2006	Kitt Peak	Spacewatch	·	540 m	MPC · JPL
596816	2006 DG_{213}	—	February 4, 2006	Kitt Peak	Spacewatch	·	630 m	MPC · JPL
596817	2006 DV_{217}	—	February 5, 2006	Mount Lemmon	Mount Lemmon Survey	·	1.7 km	MPC · JPL
596818	2006 DE_{218}	—	February 24, 2006	Kitt Peak	Spacewatch	AGN	960 m	MPC · JPL
596819	2006 DW_{219}	—	February 27, 2006	Mount Lemmon	Mount Lemmon Survey	BRG	1.4 km	MPC · JPL
596820	2006 DE_{220}	—	October 8, 2008	Kitt Peak	Spacewatch	·	1.5 km	MPC · JPL
596821	2006 DN_{220}	—	February 25, 2006	Kitt Peak	Spacewatch	·	1.0 km	MPC · JPL
596822	2006 DO_{220}	—	February 27, 2006	Mount Lemmon	Mount Lemmon Survey	·	1.6 km	MPC · JPL
596823	2006 DH_{222}	—	October 8, 2008	Kitt Peak	Spacewatch	·	1.1 km	MPC · JPL
596824	2006 DV_{223}	—	July 17, 2016	Haleakala	Pan-STARRS 1	BRG	1.4 km	MPC · JPL
596825	2006 DS_{225}	—	February 25, 2006	Kitt Peak	Spacewatch	·	1.2 km	MPC · JPL
596826	2006 EW_{7}	—	March 2, 2006	Kitt Peak	Spacewatch	·	1.2 km	MPC · JPL
596827	2006 EO_{12}	—	October 28, 1995	Kitt Peak	Spacewatch	·	1.4 km	MPC · JPL
596828	2006 ER_{12}	—	March 2, 2006	Kitt Peak	Spacewatch	·	430 m	MPC · JPL
596829	2006 ES_{15}	—	October 1, 2003	Kitt Peak	Spacewatch	·	1.5 km	MPC · JPL
596830	2006 ES_{21}	—	March 3, 2006	Kitt Peak	Spacewatch	CLO	1.6 km	MPC · JPL
596831	2006 EV_{22}	—	January 31, 2006	Kitt Peak	Spacewatch	·	1.7 km	MPC · JPL
596832	2006 EH_{25}	—	March 3, 2006	Kitt Peak	Spacewatch	·	410 m	MPC · JPL
596833	2006 EW_{26}	—	January 30, 2006	Kitt Peak	Spacewatch	·	2.2 km	MPC · JPL
596834	2006 EY_{28}	—	February 20, 2006	Mount Lemmon	Mount Lemmon Survey	·	1.3 km	MPC · JPL
596835	2006 EE_{29}	—	March 3, 2006	Kitt Peak	Spacewatch	·	1.2 km	MPC · JPL
596836	2006 EQ_{31}	—	March 3, 2006	Kitt Peak	Spacewatch	·	490 m	MPC · JPL
596837	2006 EQ_{32}	—	March 3, 2006	Kitt Peak	Spacewatch	EUN	950 m	MPC · JPL
596838	2006 EV_{32}	—	March 3, 2006	Mount Lemmon	Mount Lemmon Survey	·	990 m	MPC · JPL
596839	2006 EH_{40}	—	March 4, 2006	Kitt Peak	Spacewatch	·	1.2 km	MPC · JPL
596840	2006 EW_{51}	—	February 24, 2006	Mount Lemmon	Mount Lemmon Survey	·	1.2 km	MPC · JPL
596841	2006 EY_{55}	—	May 6, 2003	Kitt Peak	Spacewatch	·	580 m	MPC · JPL
596842	2006 EP_{58}	—	March 5, 2006	Kitt Peak	Spacewatch	·	1.9 km	MPC · JPL
596843	2006 EX_{64}	—	March 5, 2006	Kitt Peak	Spacewatch	·	1.3 km	MPC · JPL
596844	2006 EO_{66}	—	February 25, 2006	Mount Lemmon	Mount Lemmon Survey	·	1.2 km	MPC · JPL
596845	2006 EA_{68}	—	February 4, 2006	Kitt Peak	Spacewatch	TIR	2.0 km	MPC · JPL
596846	2006 ET_{72}	—	March 3, 2006	Kitt Peak	Spacewatch	EUN	850 m	MPC · JPL
596847	2006 EL_{75}	—	July 6, 2003	Kitt Peak	Spacewatch	·	1.3 km	MPC · JPL
596848	2006 EK_{77}	—	September 9, 2007	Kitt Peak	Spacewatch	·	630 m	MPC · JPL
596849	2006 EN_{77}	—	March 2, 2006	Kitt Peak	Spacewatch	·	2.2 km	MPC · JPL
596850	2006 EL_{80}	—	October 5, 2012	Haleakala	Pan-STARRS 1	EUN	1.0 km	MPC · JPL
596851	2006 EN_{80}	—	December 23, 2017	Haleakala	Pan-STARRS 1	·	850 m	MPC · JPL
596852	2006 EQ_{80}	—	February 16, 2012	Haleakala	Pan-STARRS 1	·	2.4 km	MPC · JPL
596853	2006 EG_{82}	—	March 2, 2006	Kitt Peak	Spacewatch	·	1.3 km	MPC · JPL
596854	2006 EN_{82}	—	March 4, 2006	Kitt Peak	Spacewatch	L5 · (17492)	6.1 km	MPC · JPL
596855	2006 FQ_{8}	—	March 23, 2006	Mount Lemmon	Mount Lemmon Survey	·	580 m	MPC · JPL
596856	2006 FY_{9}	—	March 24, 2006	Mount Lemmon	Mount Lemmon Survey	·	1.1 km	MPC · JPL
596857	2006 FV_{25}	—	March 24, 2006	Mount Lemmon	Mount Lemmon Survey	·	1.0 km	MPC · JPL
596858	2006 FN_{29}	—	March 24, 2006	Mount Lemmon	Mount Lemmon Survey	JUN	830 m	MPC · JPL
596859	2006 FX_{32}	—	March 25, 2006	Mount Lemmon	Mount Lemmon Survey	·	1.1 km	MPC · JPL
596860	2006 FE_{37}	—	March 2, 2006	Catalina	CSS	H	640 m	MPC · JPL
596861	2006 FF_{41}	—	March 26, 2006	Mount Lemmon	Mount Lemmon Survey	·	550 m	MPC · JPL
596862	2006 FY_{56}	—	February 26, 2012	Mount Lemmon	Mount Lemmon Survey	·	2.9 km	MPC · JPL
596863	2006 FM_{58}	—	March 3, 2006	Kitt Peak	Spacewatch	BRG	1.2 km	MPC · JPL
596864	2006 FQ_{58}	—	December 6, 2008	Kitt Peak	Spacewatch	·	650 m	MPC · JPL
596865	2006 FT_{58}	—	January 3, 2009	Mount Lemmon	Mount Lemmon Survey	·	600 m	MPC · JPL
596866	2006 FF_{60}	—	March 26, 2006	Kitt Peak	Spacewatch	AGN	1.0 km	MPC · JPL
596867	2006 FJ_{60}	—	March 26, 2006	Mount Lemmon	Mount Lemmon Survey	·	1.2 km	MPC · JPL
596868	2006 FV_{60}	—	March 24, 2006	Mount Lemmon	Mount Lemmon Survey	·	1.2 km	MPC · JPL
596869	2006 GD_{8}	—	April 2, 2006	Kitt Peak	Spacewatch	H	370 m	MPC · JPL
596870	2006 GW_{14}	—	April 2, 2006	Kitt Peak	Spacewatch	ADE	1.4 km	MPC · JPL
596871	2006 GS_{15}	—	April 2, 2006	Kitt Peak	Spacewatch	·	2.2 km	MPC · JPL
596872	2006 GT_{24}	—	April 2, 2006	Kitt Peak	Spacewatch	·	1.2 km	MPC · JPL
596873	2006 GE_{44}	—	April 2, 2006	Kitt Peak	Spacewatch	·	720 m	MPC · JPL
596874	2006 GT_{44}	—	March 4, 2006	Kitt Peak	Spacewatch	·	1 km	MPC · JPL
596875	2006 GW_{55}	—	November 30, 2008	Kitt Peak	Spacewatch	·	1.4 km	MPC · JPL
596876	2006 GF_{56}	—	March 4, 2006	Kitt Peak	Spacewatch	·	3.7 km	MPC · JPL
596877	2006 GZ_{57}	—	August 3, 2016	Haleakala	Pan-STARRS 1	HNS	790 m	MPC · JPL
596878	2006 GA_{58}	—	April 25, 2015	Haleakala	Pan-STARRS 1	·	1.4 km	MPC · JPL
596879	2006 HC_{12}	—	April 19, 2006	Kitt Peak	Spacewatch	·	1.2 km	MPC · JPL
596880	2006 HZ_{24}	—	April 20, 2006	Kitt Peak	Spacewatch	JUN	1.0 km	MPC · JPL
596881	2006 HE_{31}	—	April 24, 2006	Rehoboth	L. A. Molnar	·	1.5 km	MPC · JPL
596882	2006 HG_{37}	—	April 21, 2006	Kitt Peak	Spacewatch	·	1.6 km	MPC · JPL
596883	2006 HZ_{44}	—	March 2, 2006	Mount Lemmon	Mount Lemmon Survey	·	1.4 km	MPC · JPL
596884	2006 HP_{46}	—	April 20, 2006	Kitt Peak	Spacewatch	MIS	2.0 km	MPC · JPL
596885	2006 HQ_{47}	—	April 24, 2006	Kitt Peak	Spacewatch	HNS	1.2 km	MPC · JPL
596886	2006 HL_{60}	—	April 26, 2006	Anderson Mesa	LONEOS	·	1.3 km	MPC · JPL
596887	2006 HL_{68}	—	April 24, 2006	Mount Lemmon	Mount Lemmon Survey	·	810 m	MPC · JPL
596888	2006 HH_{77}	—	April 25, 2006	Kitt Peak	Spacewatch	EUN	1.2 km	MPC · JPL
596889	2006 HW_{79}	—	November 29, 1999	Kitt Peak	Spacewatch	·	1.5 km	MPC · JPL
596890	2006 HB_{92}	—	April 29, 2006	Kitt Peak	Spacewatch	·	1.4 km	MPC · JPL
596891	2006 HT_{93}	—	April 29, 2006	Kitt Peak	Spacewatch	·	2.3 km	MPC · JPL
596892	2006 HD_{96}	—	April 30, 2006	Kitt Peak	Spacewatch	·	780 m	MPC · JPL
596893	2006 HL_{98}	—	April 30, 2006	Kitt Peak	Spacewatch	·	1.7 km	MPC · JPL
596894	2006 HY_{99}	—	April 30, 2006	Kitt Peak	Spacewatch	HNS	920 m	MPC · JPL
596895	2006 HK_{103}	—	April 30, 2006	Kitt Peak	Spacewatch	·	3.1 km	MPC · JPL
596896	2006 HG_{105}	—	April 25, 2006	Catalina	CSS	·	1.5 km	MPC · JPL
596897	2006 HF_{109}	—	April 30, 2006	Kitt Peak	Spacewatch	·	740 m	MPC · JPL
596898	2006 HQ_{118}	—	April 30, 2006	Kitt Peak	Spacewatch	·	1.5 km	MPC · JPL
596899	2006 HG_{121}	—	April 30, 2006	Kitt Peak	Spacewatch	EUN	1.1 km	MPC · JPL
596900	2006 HD_{122}	—	April 30, 2006	Kitt Peak	Spacewatch	JUN	740 m	MPC · JPL

== 596901–597000 ==
back to top

Designation			Discovery			Properties		Ref
Permanent	Provisional	Named after	Date	Site	Discoverer(s)	Category	Diam.	Ref
596901	2006 HC_{130}	—	April 26, 2006	Cerro Tololo	Deep Ecliptic Survey	·	1.1 km	MPC · JPL
596902	2006 HZ_{135}	—	April 26, 2006	Cerro Tololo	Deep Ecliptic Survey	·	1.2 km	MPC · JPL
596903	2006 HC_{141}	—	April 27, 2006	Cerro Tololo	Deep Ecliptic Survey	·	960 m	MPC · JPL
596904	2006 HP_{155}	—	April 8, 2013	Mount Lemmon	Mount Lemmon Survey	(2076)	620 m	MPC · JPL
596905	2006 HJ_{157}	—	April 27, 2012	Haleakala	Pan-STARRS 1	THM	1.9 km	MPC · JPL
596906	2006 HN_{158}	—	April 21, 2006	Catalina	CSS	·	1.7 km	MPC · JPL
596907	2006 HT_{158}	—	March 14, 2010	Mount Lemmon	Mount Lemmon Survey	·	1.4 km	MPC · JPL
596908	2006 JA	—	May 1, 2006	Wrightwood	J. W. Young	·	1.2 km	MPC · JPL
596909	2006 JO_{1}	—	February 2, 2006	Kitt Peak	Spacewatch	JUN	1.0 km	MPC · JPL
596910	2006 JA_{17}	—	April 24, 2006	Kitt Peak	Spacewatch	·	2.1 km	MPC · JPL
596911	2006 JH_{25}	—	May 5, 2006	Mount Lemmon	Mount Lemmon Survey	·	1.3 km	MPC · JPL
596912	2006 JY_{31}	—	May 3, 2006	Kitt Peak	Spacewatch	·	520 m	MPC · JPL
596913	2006 JL_{33}	—	April 25, 2006	Kitt Peak	Spacewatch	·	1.6 km	MPC · JPL
596914	2006 JM_{36}	—	April 30, 2006	Kitt Peak	Spacewatch	·	1.6 km	MPC · JPL
596915	2006 JQ_{50}	—	May 2, 2006	Mount Lemmon	Mount Lemmon Survey	·	410 m	MPC · JPL
596916	2006 JP_{52}	—	March 26, 2006	Kitt Peak	Spacewatch	MAR	1 km	MPC · JPL
596917	2006 JM_{57}	—	May 7, 2006	Kitt Peak	Spacewatch	·	1.8 km	MPC · JPL
596918	2006 JR_{58}	—	March 23, 2006	Kitt Peak	Spacewatch	·	1.7 km	MPC · JPL
596919	2006 JA_{68}	—	May 9, 2006	Mount Lemmon	Mount Lemmon Survey	KOR	1.1 km	MPC · JPL
596920	2006 JG_{74}	—	May 1, 2006	Mauna Kea	P. A. Wiegert	KOR	1.0 km	MPC · JPL
596921	2006 JJ_{84}	—	May 1, 2006	Kitt Peak	Spacewatch	·	3.5 km	MPC · JPL
596922	2006 JO_{84}	—	May 1, 2013	Mount Lemmon	Mount Lemmon Survey	·	590 m	MPC · JPL
596923	2006 JZ_{84}	—	May 1, 2006	Kitt Peak	Spacewatch	JUN	860 m	MPC · JPL
596924	2006 JD_{86}	—	September 25, 2008	Mount Lemmon	Mount Lemmon Survey	HNS	1.1 km	MPC · JPL
596925	2006 JK_{86}	—	October 16, 2012	Kitt Peak	Spacewatch	·	1.4 km	MPC · JPL
596926	2006 JA_{87}	—	May 1, 2006	Kitt Peak	Spacewatch	·	1.0 km	MPC · JPL
596927	2006 JH_{89}	—	May 1, 2006	Kitt Peak	Spacewatch	·	1.4 km	MPC · JPL
596928	2006 KL_{17}	—	April 24, 2006	Kitt Peak	Spacewatch	·	1.9 km	MPC · JPL
596929	2006 KS_{17}	—	May 21, 2006	Kitt Peak	Spacewatch	·	1.2 km	MPC · JPL
596930	2006 KA_{19}	—	May 21, 2006	Kitt Peak	Spacewatch	·	1.7 km	MPC · JPL
596931	2006 KT_{29}	—	May 20, 2006	Kitt Peak	Spacewatch	·	1.7 km	MPC · JPL
596932	2006 KT_{35}	—	May 20, 2006	Kitt Peak	Spacewatch	·	1.5 km	MPC · JPL
596933	2006 KL_{36}	—	May 21, 2006	Kitt Peak	Spacewatch	·	1.5 km	MPC · JPL
596934	2006 KQ_{46}	—	May 21, 2006	Mount Lemmon	Mount Lemmon Survey	·	2.2 km	MPC · JPL
596935	2006 KT_{49}	—	May 21, 2006	Kitt Peak	Spacewatch	·	1.2 km	MPC · JPL
596936	2006 KO_{53}	—	May 21, 2006	Kitt Peak	Spacewatch	·	1.7 km	MPC · JPL
596937	2006 KS_{64}	—	May 23, 2006	Mount Lemmon	Mount Lemmon Survey	JUN	1.1 km	MPC · JPL
596938	2006 KO_{68}	—	May 20, 2006	Mount Lemmon	Mount Lemmon Survey	·	570 m	MPC · JPL
596939	2006 KT_{70}	—	May 22, 2006	Kitt Peak	Spacewatch	·	590 m	MPC · JPL
596940	2006 KM_{72}	—	May 22, 2006	Kitt Peak	Spacewatch	·	1.4 km	MPC · JPL
596941	2006 KP_{76}	—	May 24, 2006	Kitt Peak	Spacewatch	·	610 m	MPC · JPL
596942	2006 KZ_{81}	—	May 25, 2006	Mount Lemmon	Mount Lemmon Survey	·	1.7 km	MPC · JPL
596943	2006 KN_{86}	—	May 6, 2006	Mount Lemmon	Mount Lemmon Survey	·	840 m	MPC · JPL
596944	2006 KN_{102}	—	May 27, 2006	Kitt Peak	Spacewatch	H	480 m	MPC · JPL
596945	2006 KU_{103}	—	May 25, 2006	Mount Lemmon	Mount Lemmon Survey	(13314)	1.8 km	MPC · JPL
596946	2006 KN_{105}	—	May 30, 2006	Mount Lemmon	Mount Lemmon Survey	·	570 m	MPC · JPL
596947	2006 KV_{112}	—	May 6, 2006	Kitt Peak	Spacewatch	HNS	1.3 km	MPC · JPL
596948	2006 KF_{117}	—	May 29, 2006	Kitt Peak	Spacewatch	·	1.6 km	MPC · JPL
596949	2006 KO_{130}	—	May 25, 2006	Mauna Kea	P. A. Wiegert	·	1.4 km	MPC · JPL
596950	2006 KP_{136}	—	May 23, 2006	Mount Lemmon	Mount Lemmon Survey	·	650 m	MPC · JPL
596951	2006 KW_{138}	—	May 25, 2006	Mauna Kea	P. A. Wiegert	EUN	750 m	MPC · JPL
596952	2006 KO_{142}	—	May 20, 2006	Mount Lemmon	Mount Lemmon Survey	·	610 m	MPC · JPL
596953	2006 KB_{144}	—	May 23, 2006	Kitt Peak	Spacewatch	DOR	1.5 km	MPC · JPL
596954	2006 KM_{146}	—	December 11, 2013	Haleakala	Pan-STARRS 1	JUN	860 m	MPC · JPL
596955	2006 KB_{149}	—	May 22, 2006	Kitt Peak	Spacewatch	·	1.8 km	MPC · JPL
596956	2006 KP_{149}	—	January 12, 2016	Haleakala	Pan-STARRS 1	PHO	770 m	MPC · JPL
596957	2006 KO_{150}	—	January 19, 2012	Kitt Peak	Spacewatch	·	550 m	MPC · JPL
596958	2006 KP_{150}	—	June 12, 2011	Mount Lemmon	Mount Lemmon Survey	·	2.4 km	MPC · JPL
596959	2006 KH_{152}	—	May 21, 2006	Kitt Peak	Spacewatch	·	1.5 km	MPC · JPL
596960	2006 KD_{155}	—	June 4, 2006	Mount Lemmon	Mount Lemmon Survey	V	460 m	MPC · JPL
596961	2006 LY	—	June 3, 2006	Mount Lemmon	Mount Lemmon Survey	PHO	980 m	MPC · JPL
596962	2006 LK_{7}	—	April 29, 2006	Kitt Peak	Spacewatch	·	2.4 km	MPC · JPL
596963	2006 LF_{9}	—	May 25, 2009	Kitt Peak	Spacewatch	·	620 m	MPC · JPL
596964	2006 ML_{2}	—	May 2, 2006	Mount Lemmon	Mount Lemmon Survey	V	510 m	MPC · JPL
596965	2006 MA_{16}	—	January 7, 2016	Haleakala	Pan-STARRS 1	LUT	3.5 km	MPC · JPL
596966	2006 MO_{16}	—	October 27, 2009	Mount Lemmon	Mount Lemmon Survey	L4	9.3 km	MPC · JPL
596967	2006 NN	—	July 9, 2002	Palomar	NEAT	·	1.7 km	MPC · JPL
596968	2006 OR_{16}	—	June 22, 2006	Palomar	NEAT	JUN	1.1 km	MPC · JPL
596969	2006 OK_{22}	—	July 21, 2006	Mount Lemmon	Mount Lemmon Survey	HOF	2.1 km	MPC · JPL
596970	2006 OJ_{23}	—	November 2, 2007	Mount Lemmon	Mount Lemmon Survey	WIT	770 m	MPC · JPL
596971	2006 OY_{23}	—	June 22, 2006	Kitt Peak	Spacewatch	·	2.0 km	MPC · JPL
596972	2006 OT_{24}	—	June 22, 2006	Kitt Peak	Spacewatch	·	1.4 km	MPC · JPL
596973	2006 OO_{26}	—	January 4, 2003	Kitt Peak	Spacewatch	LIX	3.4 km	MPC · JPL
596974	2006 OS_{29}	—	July 21, 2006	Mount Lemmon	Mount Lemmon Survey	HOF	2.0 km	MPC · JPL
596975	2006 OF_{31}	—	July 19, 2006	Mauna Kea	P. A. Wiegert, D. Subasinghe	·	650 m	MPC · JPL
596976	2006 OX_{37}	—	July 19, 2006	Mauna Kea	P. A. Wiegert, D. Subasinghe	L4	7.6 km	MPC · JPL
596977	2006 OH_{38}	—	July 21, 2006	Mount Lemmon	Mount Lemmon Survey	·	1.2 km	MPC · JPL
596978	2006 OV_{39}	—	March 15, 2012	Mount Lemmon	Mount Lemmon Survey	·	570 m	MPC · JPL
596979	2006 OZ_{39}	—	January 29, 2012	Kitt Peak	Spacewatch	L4	8.1 km	MPC · JPL
596980	2006 PV	—	August 11, 2006	Palomar	NEAT	·	1.5 km	MPC · JPL
596981	2006 PR_{5}	—	August 12, 2006	Palomar	NEAT	·	800 m	MPC · JPL
596982	2006 PM_{9}	—	August 13, 2006	Palomar	NEAT	MAS	580 m	MPC · JPL
596983	2006 PC_{13}	—	August 14, 2006	Siding Spring	SSS	GEF	1.3 km	MPC · JPL
596984	2006 PY_{24}	—	August 13, 2006	Palomar	NEAT	·	650 m	MPC · JPL
596985	2006 PK_{33}	—	August 13, 2006	Palomar	NEAT	·	980 m	MPC · JPL
596986	2006 QS_{10}	—	August 17, 2006	Goodricke-Pigott	R. A. Tucker	·	2.2 km	MPC · JPL
596987	2006 QV_{12}	—	August 16, 2006	Siding Spring	SSS	·	780 m	MPC · JPL
596988	2006 QZ_{13}	—	August 12, 2006	Palomar	NEAT	·	840 m	MPC · JPL
596989	2006 QP_{14}	—	August 16, 2006	Siding Spring	SSS	NYS	1.1 km	MPC · JPL
596990	2006 QG_{40}	—	August 25, 2006	Sewanee	Durig, D.	·	1.9 km	MPC · JPL
596991	2006 QA_{44}	—	August 19, 2006	Kitt Peak	Spacewatch	·	670 m	MPC · JPL
596992	2006 QT_{49}	—	August 22, 2006	Palomar	NEAT	·	1.1 km	MPC · JPL
596993	2006 QT_{52}	—	August 15, 2006	Palomar	NEAT	·	1.0 km	MPC · JPL
596994	2006 QZ_{54}	—	August 19, 2006	Anderson Mesa	LONEOS	·	630 m	MPC · JPL
596995	2006 QR_{57}	—	July 18, 2006	Siding Spring	SSS	·	970 m	MPC · JPL
596996 Suhantzong	2006 QQ_{58}	Suhantzong	August 27, 2006	Lulin	LUSS	·	2.8 km	MPC · JPL
596997	2006 QN_{65}	—	August 19, 2006	Kitt Peak	Spacewatch	DOR	1.9 km	MPC · JPL
596998	2006 QN_{69}	—	August 21, 2006	Kitt Peak	Spacewatch	·	820 m	MPC · JPL
596999	2006 QV_{70}	—	August 21, 2006	Kitt Peak	Spacewatch	·	700 m	MPC · JPL
597000	2006 QJ_{73}	—	August 21, 2006	Kitt Peak	Spacewatch	AGN	1.2 km	MPC · JPL

back to top

== Meaning of names ==
As minor planet discoveries are confirmed, they are given a permanent number by the IAU's Minor Planet Center (MPC), and the discoverers can then submit names for them, following the IAU's naming conventions. The list below concerns those minor planets in the specified number-range that have received names, and explains the meanings of those names.

Official naming citations of newly named small Solar System bodies are approved and published in a bulletin by IAU's Working Group for Small Bodies Nomenclature (WGSBN). Before May 2021, citations were published in MPC's Minor Planet Circulars for many decades. Recent citations can also be found on the JPL Small-Body Database (SBDB). Until his death in 2016, German astronomer Lutz D. Schmadel compiled these citations into the Dictionary of Minor Planet Names (DMP) and regularly updated the collection.

Based on Paul Herget's The Names of the Minor Planets, Schmadel also researched the unclear origin of numerous asteroids, most of which had been named prior to World War II. This article incorporates text from this source, which is in the public domain: SBDB New namings may only be added to this list below after official publication as the preannouncement of names is condemned. The WGSBN publishes a comprehensive guideline for the naming rules of non-cometary small Solar System bodies.

Named minor planet	Provisional	This minor planet was named for...	Ref · Catalog
596543 Ubu	2005 WK_{50}	Ubu is a character created by the French writer Alfred Jarry. He appeared for the first time in the play Ubu Roi in 1896.	IAU · 596543
596588 Jamesliebert	2005 XN_{80}	James W. Liebert (b. 1946), an American astronomer.	IAU · 596588
596687 Patrickcôté	2006 AZ_{103}	Patrick Côté, Canadian astronomer	IAU · 596687
596996 Suhantzong	2006 QQ_{58}	Han-Tzong Su (born 1956), a popularizer of astronomy at National Cheng Kung University, Taiwan, who has been translating content of NASA's Astronomy Picture of the Day (APOD) website into Chinese for over two decades.	IAU · 596996
