= List of minor planets: 645001–646000 =

The following is a partial list of minor planets, running from minor-planet number 645001 through 646000, inclusive. The primary data for this and other partial lists is based on JPL's "Small-Body Orbital Elements" and data available from the Minor Planet Center. Critical list information is also provided by the MPC, unless otherwise specified from Lowell Observatory. A detailed description of the table's columns and additional sources are given on the main page including a complete list of every page in this series, and a statistical break-up on the dynamical classification of minor planets.

Also see the summary list of all named bodies in numerical and alphabetical order, and the corresponding naming citations for the number range of this particular list. New namings may only be added to this list after official publication, as the preannouncement of names is condemned by the Working Group for Small Bodies Nomenclature of the International Astronomical Union.

Near-Earth obj.	MBA (inner)	MBA (outer)	Centaur
Mars-crosser	MBA (middle)	Jupiter trojan	Trans-Neptunian obj.
Unclassified

== 645001–645100 ==
Designation			Discovery			Properties		Ref
Permanent	Provisional	Named after	Date	Site	Discoverer(s)	Category	Diam.	Ref
645001	2007 CR_{27}	—	December 16, 2006	Kitt Peak	Spacewatch	·	470 m	MPC; JPL
645002	2007 CC_{30}	—	March 23, 2003	Apache Point	SDSS Collaboration	JUN	930 m	MPC; JPL
645003	2007 CO_{34}	—	January 25, 2007	Kitt Peak	Spacewatch	·	1.1 km	MPC; JPL
645004	2007 CC_{35}	—	February 6, 2007	Kitt Peak	Spacewatch	·	2.7 km	MPC; JPL
645005	2007 CP_{36}	—	January 26, 2007	Kitt Peak	Spacewatch	·	540 m	MPC; JPL
645006	2007 CS_{38}	—	February 6, 2007	Mount Lemmon	Mount Lemmon Survey	·	980 m	MPC; JPL
645007	2007 CU_{44}	—	February 10, 2007	Mount Lemmon	Mount Lemmon Survey	EUP	2.7 km	MPC; JPL
645008	2007 CQ_{45}	—	January 26, 2007	Piszkéstető	K. Sárneczky	TIR	2.8 km	MPC; JPL
645009	2007 CY_{47}	—	October 1, 2005	Mount Lemmon	Mount Lemmon Survey	·	1.3 km	MPC; JPL
645010	2007 CR_{48}	—	February 10, 2007	Mount Lemmon	Mount Lemmon Survey	·	1 km	MPC; JPL
645011	2007 CS_{49}	—	February 10, 2007	Mount Lemmon	Mount Lemmon Survey	EUN	1.2 km	MPC; JPL
645012	2007 CP_{59}	—	January 28, 2007	Catalina	CSS	·	1.8 km	MPC; JPL
645013	2007 CJ_{68}	—	January 17, 2007	Kitt Peak	Spacewatch	·	1.2 km	MPC; JPL
645014	2007 CU_{77}	—	February 14, 2007	Mauna Kea	P. A. Wiegert	AST	1.2 km	MPC; JPL
645015	2007 CD_{79}	—	February 6, 2007	Palomar	NEAT	·	3.2 km	MPC; JPL
645016	2007 CN_{80}	—	February 8, 2007	Mount Lemmon	Mount Lemmon Survey	·	660 m	MPC; JPL
645017	2007 CC_{81}	—	February 6, 2007	Mount Lemmon	Mount Lemmon Survey	·	2.8 km	MPC; JPL
645018	2007 CE_{82}	—	December 9, 2015	Mount Lemmon	Mount Lemmon Survey	·	1.7 km	MPC; JPL
645019	2007 CJ_{82}	—	February 6, 2007	Palomar	NEAT	·	660 m	MPC; JPL
645020	2007 CO_{83}	—	October 25, 2014	Haleakala	Pan-STARRS 1	·	1.2 km	MPC; JPL
645021	2007 CR_{83}	—	February 10, 2007	Mount Lemmon	Mount Lemmon Survey	·	1.4 km	MPC; JPL
645022	2007 CT_{83}	—	November 11, 2016	Mount Lemmon	Mount Lemmon Survey	·	570 m	MPC; JPL
645023	2007 CF_{84}	—	February 7, 2007	Mount Lemmon	Mount Lemmon Survey	·	1.6 km	MPC; JPL
645024	2007 CZ_{84}	—	February 9, 2007	Kitt Peak	Spacewatch	·	1.9 km	MPC; JPL
645025	2007 CO_{85}	—	February 6, 2007	Mount Lemmon	Mount Lemmon Survey	·	2.9 km	MPC; JPL
645026	2007 DZ_{1}	—	August 27, 2005	Palomar	NEAT	·	870 m	MPC; JPL
645027	2007 DX_{9}	—	February 17, 2007	Kitt Peak	Spacewatch	·	2.2 km	MPC; JPL
645028	2007 DD_{10}	—	January 27, 2007	Kitt Peak	Spacewatch	·	640 m	MPC; JPL
645029	2007 DF_{17}	—	February 17, 2007	Kitt Peak	Spacewatch	·	1.5 km	MPC; JPL
645030	2007 DO_{17}	—	February 17, 2007	Kitt Peak	Spacewatch	·	1.6 km	MPC; JPL
645031	2007 DG_{23}	—	February 17, 2007	Kitt Peak	Spacewatch	·	2.7 km	MPC; JPL
645032	2007 DV_{25}	—	February 17, 2007	Kitt Peak	Spacewatch	·	1.4 km	MPC; JPL
645033	2007 DO_{29}	—	October 29, 2005	Kitt Peak	Spacewatch	·	1.3 km	MPC; JPL
645034	2007 DO_{36}	—	February 17, 2007	Kitt Peak	Spacewatch	·	1.7 km	MPC; JPL
645035	2007 DC_{40}	—	February 19, 2007	Kitt Peak	Spacewatch	·	3.1 km	MPC; JPL
645036	2007 DP_{46}	—	February 21, 2007	Eskridge	G. Hug	·	3.1 km	MPC; JPL
645037	2007 DQ_{46}	—	February 7, 2007	Mount Lemmon	Mount Lemmon Survey	·	1.2 km	MPC; JPL
645038	2007 DS_{51}	—	February 17, 2007	Mount Lemmon	Mount Lemmon Survey	·	1.2 km	MPC; JPL
645039	2007 DE_{63}	—	February 21, 2007	Kitt Peak	Spacewatch	·	520 m	MPC; JPL
645040	2007 DC_{64}	—	February 21, 2007	Kitt Peak	Spacewatch	·	580 m	MPC; JPL
645041	2007 DV_{64}	—	February 21, 2007	Kitt Peak	Spacewatch	·	1.1 km	MPC; JPL
645042	2007 DN_{65}	—	February 21, 2007	Kitt Peak	Spacewatch	·	1.4 km	MPC; JPL
645043	2007 DD_{69}	—	February 21, 2007	Kitt Peak	Spacewatch	·	1.2 km	MPC; JPL
645044	2007 DX_{72}	—	February 21, 2007	Kitt Peak	Spacewatch	·	1.3 km	MPC; JPL
645045	2007 DP_{83}	—	April 11, 2003	Kitt Peak	Spacewatch	·	1.6 km	MPC; JPL
645046	2007 DO_{87}	—	February 23, 2007	Kitt Peak	Spacewatch	·	710 m	MPC; JPL
645047	2007 DD_{88}	—	February 23, 2007	Kitt Peak	Spacewatch	·	1.1 km	MPC; JPL
645048	2007 DD_{91}	—	February 23, 2007	Mount Lemmon	Mount Lemmon Survey	·	550 m	MPC; JPL
645049	2007 DD_{109}	—	June 19, 2004	Kitt Peak	Spacewatch	·	930 m	MPC; JPL
645050	2007 DG_{114}	—	February 26, 2007	Mount Lemmon	Mount Lemmon Survey	·	1.8 km	MPC; JPL
645051	2007 DY_{116}	—	August 8, 2005	Cerro Tololo	Deep Ecliptic Survey	·	1.1 km	MPC; JPL
645052	2007 DF_{117}	—	February 21, 2007	Mount Lemmon	Mount Lemmon Survey	·	1.1 km	MPC; JPL
645053	2007 DT_{119}	—	February 26, 2007	Mount Lemmon	Mount Lemmon Survey	·	2.5 km	MPC; JPL
645054	2007 DZ_{120}	—	April 30, 2011	Mount Lemmon	Mount Lemmon Survey	·	790 m	MPC; JPL
645055	2007 DD_{121}	—	September 12, 2016	Mount Lemmon	Mount Lemmon Survey	·	2.3 km	MPC; JPL
645056	2007 DT_{121}	—	September 27, 2016	Haleakala	Pan-STARRS 1	·	2.2 km	MPC; JPL
645057	2007 DZ_{121}	—	August 23, 2008	Siding Spring	SSS	·	1.3 km	MPC; JPL
645058	2007 DC_{122}	—	October 25, 2016	Haleakala	Pan-STARRS 1	VER	1.9 km	MPC; JPL
645059	2007 DB_{123}	—	February 17, 2007	Mount Lemmon	Mount Lemmon Survey	·	2.5 km	MPC; JPL
645060	2007 DK_{123}	—	February 23, 2007	Mount Lemmon	Mount Lemmon Survey	·	2.4 km	MPC; JPL
645061	2007 DM_{123}	—	February 28, 2014	Haleakala	Pan-STARRS 1	·	680 m	MPC; JPL
645062	2007 DD_{124}	—	February 25, 2007	Mount Lemmon	Mount Lemmon Survey	HNS	1.0 km	MPC; JPL
645063	2007 DV_{124}	—	August 26, 2012	Catalina	CSS	·	1.0 km	MPC; JPL
645064	2007 DR_{125}	—	January 28, 2007	Mount Lemmon	Mount Lemmon Survey	·	1.2 km	MPC; JPL
645065	2007 DB_{126}	—	May 26, 2014	Haleakala	Pan-STARRS 1	·	2.8 km	MPC; JPL
645066	2007 DW_{126}	—	May 7, 2014	Haleakala	Pan-STARRS 1	·	2.5 km	MPC; JPL
645067	2007 DD_{127}	—	February 22, 2007	Kitt Peak	Spacewatch	·	1.3 km	MPC; JPL
645068	2007 DE_{127}	—	February 25, 2007	Kitt Peak	Spacewatch	·	580 m	MPC; JPL
645069	2007 DR_{127}	—	February 21, 2007	Kitt Peak	Spacewatch	ADE	1.3 km	MPC; JPL
645070	2007 DH_{132}	—	February 25, 2007	Kitt Peak	Spacewatch	·	760 m	MPC; JPL
645071	2007 ER_{2}	—	March 9, 2007	Mount Lemmon	Mount Lemmon Survey	·	830 m	MPC; JPL
645072	2007 ET_{7}	—	March 9, 2007	Mount Lemmon	Mount Lemmon Survey	·	2.6 km	MPC; JPL
645073	2007 EA_{8}	—	March 9, 2007	Mount Lemmon	Mount Lemmon Survey	T_{j} (2.98) · EUP	3.6 km	MPC; JPL
645074	2007 EL_{10}	—	March 9, 2007	Kitt Peak	Spacewatch	·	2.4 km	MPC; JPL
645075	2007 EZ_{10}	—	February 23, 2007	Mount Lemmon	Mount Lemmon Survey	·	3.0 km	MPC; JPL
645076	2007 EH_{14}	—	February 26, 2007	Mount Lemmon	Mount Lemmon Survey	·	1.2 km	MPC; JPL
645077	2007 EU_{15}	—	March 9, 2007	Mount Lemmon	Mount Lemmon Survey	·	2.4 km	MPC; JPL
645078	2007 EZ_{16}	—	March 9, 2007	Kitt Peak	Spacewatch	·	1.2 km	MPC; JPL
645079	2007 EO_{29}	—	March 9, 2007	Mount Lemmon	Mount Lemmon Survey	·	1.3 km	MPC; JPL
645080	2007 EQ_{30}	—	March 10, 2007	Kitt Peak	Spacewatch	EUP	2.5 km	MPC; JPL
645081	2007 EL_{34}	—	August 31, 2005	Kitt Peak	Spacewatch	·	720 m	MPC; JPL
645082	2007 EN_{35}	—	May 1, 2003	Kitt Peak	Spacewatch	·	1.4 km	MPC; JPL
645083	2007 EW_{44}	—	March 9, 2007	Mount Lemmon	Mount Lemmon Survey	·	1.5 km	MPC; JPL
645084	2007 EP_{49}	—	December 25, 2005	Mount Lemmon	Mount Lemmon Survey	·	2.9 km	MPC; JPL
645085	2007 ES_{50}	—	February 21, 2007	Kitt Peak	Spacewatch	·	1.4 km	MPC; JPL
645086	2007 EY_{50}	—	February 21, 2007	Kitt Peak	Spacewatch	·	2.6 km	MPC; JPL
645087	2007 EK_{52}	—	February 19, 2007	Mount Lemmon	Mount Lemmon Survey	·	750 m	MPC; JPL
645088	2007 EN_{52}	—	March 11, 2007	Catalina	CSS	·	1.5 km	MPC; JPL
645089	2007 EB_{54}	—	March 11, 2007	Kitt Peak	Spacewatch	(2076)	670 m	MPC; JPL
645090	2007 EY_{54}	—	March 12, 2007	Mount Lemmon	Mount Lemmon Survey	·	2.4 km	MPC; JPL
645091	2007 EH_{59}	—	March 9, 2007	Mount Lemmon	Mount Lemmon Survey	·	1.2 km	MPC; JPL
645092	2007 EL_{63}	—	February 25, 2007	Kitt Peak	Spacewatch	·	890 m	MPC; JPL
645093	2007 EW_{63}	—	February 17, 2007	Mount Lemmon	Mount Lemmon Survey	·	1.5 km	MPC; JPL
645094	2007 ES_{65}	—	March 10, 2007	Kitt Peak	Spacewatch	(2076)	580 m	MPC; JPL
645095	2007 ED_{68}	—	March 10, 2007	Kitt Peak	Spacewatch	·	2.6 km	MPC; JPL
645096	2007 EA_{69}	—	March 10, 2007	Kitt Peak	Spacewatch	·	1.4 km	MPC; JPL
645097	2007 EP_{71}	—	February 25, 2007	Mount Lemmon	Mount Lemmon Survey	·	870 m	MPC; JPL
645098	2007 ED_{76}	—	March 10, 2007	Kitt Peak	Spacewatch	·	600 m	MPC; JPL
645099	2007 EZ_{80}	—	March 11, 2007	Kitt Peak	Spacewatch	·	1.6 km	MPC; JPL
645100	2007 ES_{81}	—	March 11, 2007	Mount Lemmon	Mount Lemmon Survey	MAS	650 m	MPC; JPL

== 645101–645200 ==
back to top

Designation			Discovery			Properties		Ref
Permanent	Provisional	Named after	Date	Site	Discoverer(s)	Category	Diam.	Ref
645101	2007 EO_{83}	—	March 12, 2007	Kitt Peak	Spacewatch	·	600 m	MPC; JPL
645102	2007 EB_{89}	—	March 9, 2007	Kitt Peak	Spacewatch	HNS	790 m	MPC; JPL
645103	2007 EH_{91}	—	January 28, 2007	Mount Lemmon	Mount Lemmon Survey	·	1.3 km	MPC; JPL
645104	2007 EJ_{95}	—	March 10, 2007	Mount Lemmon	Mount Lemmon Survey	·	510 m	MPC; JPL
645105	2007 EK_{96}	—	March 10, 2007	Mount Lemmon	Mount Lemmon Survey	·	1.4 km	MPC; JPL
645106	2007 EM_{98}	—	October 27, 2005	Kitt Peak	Spacewatch	·	1.1 km	MPC; JPL
645107	2007 EW_{103}	—	March 11, 2007	Mount Lemmon	Mount Lemmon Survey	V	450 m	MPC; JPL
645108	2007 EJ_{107}	—	March 11, 2007	Kitt Peak	Spacewatch	·	710 m	MPC; JPL
645109	2007 ER_{114}	—	March 13, 2007	Mount Lemmon	Mount Lemmon Survey	·	820 m	MPC; JPL
645110	2007 EM_{116}	—	March 13, 2007	Mount Lemmon	Mount Lemmon Survey	·	1.8 km	MPC; JPL
645111	2007 EN_{123}	—	March 11, 2007	Anderson Mesa	LONEOS	·	1.3 km	MPC; JPL
645112	2007 EO_{123}	—	March 14, 2007	Mount Lemmon	Mount Lemmon Survey	·	1.1 km	MPC; JPL
645113	2007 ED_{126}	—	March 15, 2007	San Marcello	San Marcello	·	620 m	MPC; JPL
645114	2007 ES_{127}	—	March 9, 2007	Mount Lemmon	Mount Lemmon Survey	·	1.5 km	MPC; JPL
645115	2007 ES_{134}	—	March 10, 2007	Kitt Peak	Spacewatch	·	900 m	MPC; JPL
645116	2007 EJ_{138}	—	January 28, 2007	Kitt Peak	Spacewatch	·	1.2 km	MPC; JPL
645117	2007 EK_{140}	—	February 16, 2007	Mount Lemmon	Mount Lemmon Survey	·	620 m	MPC; JPL
645118	2007 EZ_{147}	—	March 12, 2007	Mount Lemmon	Mount Lemmon Survey	·	1.4 km	MPC; JPL
645119	2007 EC_{150}	—	March 12, 2007	Mount Lemmon	Mount Lemmon Survey	·	2.4 km	MPC; JPL
645120	2007 EC_{156}	—	October 30, 2005	Kitt Peak	Spacewatch	(2076)	690 m	MPC; JPL
645121	2007 ED_{158}	—	March 13, 2007	Lulin	LUSS	·	860 m	MPC; JPL
645122	2007 ET_{158}	—	January 27, 2007	Mount Lemmon	Mount Lemmon Survey	·	1.2 km	MPC; JPL
645123	2007 EN_{162}	—	July 28, 2005	Palomar	NEAT	·	610 m	MPC; JPL
645124	2007 EX_{162}	—	March 15, 2007	Mount Lemmon	Mount Lemmon Survey	MAR	840 m	MPC; JPL
645125	2007 EE_{164}	—	March 15, 2007	Mount Lemmon	Mount Lemmon Survey	·	780 m	MPC; JPL
645126	2007 EJ_{164}	—	March 15, 2007	Mount Lemmon	Mount Lemmon Survey	·	800 m	MPC; JPL
645127	2007 EV_{168}	—	March 13, 2007	Kitt Peak	Spacewatch	TIN	920 m	MPC; JPL
645128	2007 EW_{174}	—	March 14, 2007	Kitt Peak	Spacewatch	·	730 m	MPC; JPL
645129	2007 EE_{180}	—	March 14, 2007	Kitt Peak	Spacewatch	·	1.7 km	MPC; JPL
645130	2007 EM_{184}	—	March 12, 2007	Mount Lemmon	Mount Lemmon Survey	·	2.9 km	MPC; JPL
645131	2007 ED_{185}	—	March 14, 2007	Mount Lemmon	Mount Lemmon Survey	·	1.1 km	MPC; JPL
645132	2007 EP_{185}	—	December 1, 2005	Mount Lemmon	Mount Lemmon Survey	·	2.2 km	MPC; JPL
645133	2007 EZ_{191}	—	March 13, 2007	Kitt Peak	Spacewatch	·	590 m	MPC; JPL
645134	2007 EE_{197}	—	March 15, 2007	Kitt Peak	Spacewatch	·	1.5 km	MPC; JPL
645135	2007 EC_{200}	—	February 19, 2001	Socorro	LINEAR	THB	3.3 km	MPC; JPL
645136	2007 ER_{201}	—	March 7, 2007	Mount Lemmon	Mount Lemmon Survey	·	2.9 km	MPC; JPL
645137	2007 ER_{207}	—	March 14, 2007	Mount Lemmon	Mount Lemmon Survey	NEM	2.4 km	MPC; JPL
645138	2007 ED_{208}	—	March 14, 2007	Mount Lemmon	Mount Lemmon Survey	·	1.6 km	MPC; JPL
645139	2007 EP_{211}	—	February 27, 2007	Kitt Peak	Spacewatch	·	920 m	MPC; JPL
645140	2007 ED_{218}	—	March 9, 2007	Mount Lemmon	Mount Lemmon Survey	·	600 m	MPC; JPL
645141	2007 EB_{224}	—	March 13, 2007	Kitt Peak	Spacewatch	V	540 m	MPC; JPL
645142	2007 ET_{227}	—	March 15, 2007	Mount Lemmon	Mount Lemmon Survey	·	770 m	MPC; JPL
645143	2007 EX_{227}	—	March 6, 2013	Haleakala	Pan-STARRS 1	URS	2.8 km	MPC; JPL
645144	2007 EA_{228}	—	January 20, 2013	Mount Lemmon	Mount Lemmon Survey	·	2.3 km	MPC; JPL
645145	2007 EC_{228}	—	March 14, 2007	Kitt Peak	Spacewatch	HYG	2.6 km	MPC; JPL
645146	2007 EQ_{228}	—	September 27, 2016	Haleakala	Pan-STARRS 1	·	2.8 km	MPC; JPL
645147	2007 EO_{229}	—	March 9, 2007	Kitt Peak	Spacewatch	·	660 m	MPC; JPL
645148	2007 ET_{229}	—	October 17, 2012	Haleakala	Pan-STARRS 1	·	520 m	MPC; JPL
645149	2007 EP_{230}	—	July 27, 2015	Haleakala	Pan-STARRS 1	·	540 m	MPC; JPL
645150	2007 ER_{230}	—	September 25, 2016	Haleakala	Pan-STARRS 1	·	2.5 km	MPC; JPL
645151	2007 EH_{231}	—	March 13, 2011	Mount Lemmon	Mount Lemmon Survey	·	1.1 km	MPC; JPL
645152	2007 EQ_{231}	—	September 6, 2008	Mount Lemmon	Mount Lemmon Survey	NYS	890 m	MPC; JPL
645153	2007 ES_{231}	—	January 3, 2012	Mount Lemmon	Mount Lemmon Survey	ELF	2.9 km	MPC; JPL
645154	2007 EA_{232}	—	March 28, 2014	Mount Lemmon	Mount Lemmon Survey	·	590 m	MPC; JPL
645155	2007 EB_{232}	—	October 22, 2012	Mount Lemmon	Mount Lemmon Survey	V	410 m	MPC; JPL
645156	2007 EG_{232}	—	September 23, 2012	Mount Lemmon	Mount Lemmon Survey	·	1.2 km	MPC; JPL
645157	2007 EG_{233}	—	April 26, 2017	Haleakala	Pan-STARRS 1	·	1.8 km	MPC; JPL
645158	2007 EK_{234}	—	March 12, 2007	Kitt Peak	Spacewatch	·	2.2 km	MPC; JPL
645159	2007 EM_{234}	—	March 14, 2007	Mount Lemmon	Mount Lemmon Survey	·	690 m	MPC; JPL
645160	2007 EN_{234}	—	March 14, 2007	Mount Lemmon	Mount Lemmon Survey	·	970 m	MPC; JPL
645161	2007 EC_{235}	—	May 11, 2008	Mount Lemmon	Mount Lemmon Survey	L5	7.6 km	MPC; JPL
645162	2007 EU_{236}	—	March 9, 2007	Kitt Peak	Spacewatch	·	1.3 km	MPC; JPL
645163	2007 ED_{237}	—	May 22, 2012	Mount Lemmon	Mount Lemmon Survey	·	1.4 km	MPC; JPL
645164	2007 EG_{237}	—	March 12, 2007	Kitt Peak	Spacewatch	·	630 m	MPC; JPL
645165	2007 EJ_{238}	—	March 10, 2007	Mount Lemmon	Mount Lemmon Survey	·	1.4 km	MPC; JPL
645166	2007 EL_{238}	—	March 10, 2007	Mount Lemmon	Mount Lemmon Survey	PAD	1.2 km	MPC; JPL
645167	2007 EQ_{238}	—	March 10, 2007	Mount Lemmon	Mount Lemmon Survey	·	1.2 km	MPC; JPL
645168	2007 ES_{238}	—	March 14, 2007	Mount Lemmon	Mount Lemmon Survey	GEF	1.1 km	MPC; JPL
645169	2007 EW_{238}	—	March 13, 2007	Kitt Peak	Spacewatch	·	760 m	MPC; JPL
645170	2007 EH_{239}	—	March 14, 2007	Mount Lemmon	Mount Lemmon Survey	·	1.4 km	MPC; JPL
645171	2007 EJ_{239}	—	March 11, 2007	Mount Lemmon	Mount Lemmon Survey	NYS	730 m	MPC; JPL
645172	2007 EB_{240}	—	March 11, 2007	Kitt Peak	Spacewatch	·	890 m	MPC; JPL
645173	2007 EN_{241}	—	March 15, 2007	Kitt Peak	Spacewatch	GEF	970 m	MPC; JPL
645174	2007 ET_{241}	—	March 12, 2007	Mount Lemmon	Mount Lemmon Survey	·	1.5 km	MPC; JPL
645175	2007 ET_{242}	—	March 9, 2007	Mount Lemmon	Mount Lemmon Survey	·	2.3 km	MPC; JPL
645176	2007 FK_{4}	—	March 18, 2007	Mount Nyukasa	Japan Aerospace Exploration Agency	EUN	1.2 km	MPC; JPL
645177	2007 FL_{6}	—	March 16, 2007	Mount Lemmon	Mount Lemmon Survey	·	1.2 km	MPC; JPL
645178	2007 FM_{6}	—	March 16, 2007	Mount Lemmon	Mount Lemmon Survey	·	1.3 km	MPC; JPL
645179	2007 FF_{8}	—	February 23, 2007	Mount Lemmon	Mount Lemmon Survey	AEO	770 m	MPC; JPL
645180	2007 FJ_{9}	—	March 16, 2007	Kitt Peak	Spacewatch	·	720 m	MPC; JPL
645181	2007 FP_{13}	—	March 19, 2007	Mount Lemmon	Mount Lemmon Survey	·	3.4 km	MPC; JPL
645182	2007 FB_{15}	—	March 19, 2007	Mount Lemmon	Mount Lemmon Survey	·	1.7 km	MPC; JPL
645183	2007 FM_{17}	—	March 20, 2007	Kitt Peak	Spacewatch	·	570 m	MPC; JPL
645184	2007 FB_{18}	—	February 23, 2007	Catalina	CSS	·	1.3 km	MPC; JPL
645185	2007 FO_{22}	—	March 9, 2007	Kitt Peak	Spacewatch	·	790 m	MPC; JPL
645186	2007 FJ_{27}	—	March 20, 2007	Mount Lemmon	Mount Lemmon Survey	·	1.2 km	MPC; JPL
645187	2007 FL_{29}	—	March 20, 2007	Mount Lemmon	Mount Lemmon Survey	·	1.6 km	MPC; JPL
645188	2007 FY_{29}	—	March 9, 2007	Mount Lemmon	Mount Lemmon Survey	·	750 m	MPC; JPL
645189	2007 FT_{33}	—	March 9, 2007	Mount Lemmon	Mount Lemmon Survey	·	600 m	MPC; JPL
645190	2007 FR_{34}	—	March 17, 2007	Mauna Kea	D. D. Balam, K. M. Perrett	·	1.2 km	MPC; JPL
645191	2007 FD_{40}	—	October 8, 2005	Kitt Peak	Spacewatch	JUN	1.0 km	MPC; JPL
645192	2007 FK_{40}	—	March 20, 2007	Mauna Kea	D. D. Balam, K. M. Perrett	·	2.5 km	MPC; JPL
645193	2007 FK_{47}	—	March 26, 2007	Mount Lemmon	Mount Lemmon Survey	·	1.2 km	MPC; JPL
645194	2007 FN_{53}	—	February 12, 2011	Mount Lemmon	Mount Lemmon Survey	·	1.6 km	MPC; JPL
645195	2007 FU_{53}	—	December 13, 2017	Mount Lemmon	Mount Lemmon Survey	T_{j} (2.92)	3.4 km	MPC; JPL
645196	2007 FD_{56}	—	December 24, 2016	Mount Lemmon	Mount Lemmon Survey	·	690 m	MPC; JPL
645197	2007 FJ_{56}	—	August 26, 2012	Haleakala	Pan-STARRS 1	·	780 m	MPC; JPL
645198	2007 FK_{56}	—	October 6, 2011	Charleston	R. Holmes	·	760 m	MPC; JPL
645199	2007 FN_{57}	—	October 8, 2012	Mount Lemmon	Mount Lemmon Survey	·	1.0 km	MPC; JPL
645200	2007 FW_{58}	—	February 5, 2011	Haleakala	Pan-STARRS 1	·	1.5 km	MPC; JPL

== 645201–645300 ==
back to top

Designation			Discovery			Properties		Ref
Permanent	Provisional	Named after	Date	Site	Discoverer(s)	Category	Diam.	Ref
645201	2007 GG_{1}	—	April 7, 2007	Bergisch Gladbach	W. Bickel	·	770 m	MPC; JPL
645202	2007 GH_{1}	—	March 10, 2007	Mount Lemmon	Mount Lemmon Survey	·	900 m	MPC; JPL
645203	2007 GM_{4}	—	April 11, 2007	Lulin	LUSS	·	2.2 km	MPC; JPL
645204	2007 GN_{4}	—	April 11, 2007	Lulin	LUSS	·	830 m	MPC; JPL
645205	2007 GJ_{5}	—	April 12, 2007	Bergisch Gladbach	W. Bickel	·	1.9 km	MPC; JPL
645206	2007 GK_{5}	—	April 11, 2007	Bergisch Gladbach	W. Bickel	·	1.5 km	MPC; JPL
645207	2007 GB_{8}	—	March 18, 2007	Kitt Peak	Spacewatch	·	1.1 km	MPC; JPL
645208	2007 GC_{10}	—	March 9, 2007	Mount Lemmon	Mount Lemmon Survey	PHO	730 m	MPC; JPL
645209	2007 GH_{10}	—	March 11, 2007	Kitt Peak	Spacewatch	·	1.6 km	MPC; JPL
645210	2007 GM_{10}	—	March 11, 2007	Kitt Peak	Spacewatch	·	2.3 km	MPC; JPL
645211	2007 GJ_{14}	—	March 20, 2007	Catalina	CSS	·	2.6 km	MPC; JPL
645212	2007 GX_{25}	—	March 16, 2007	Kitt Peak	Spacewatch	·	620 m	MPC; JPL
645213	2007 GM_{32}	—	March 16, 2007	Mount Lemmon	Mount Lemmon Survey	·	790 m	MPC; JPL
645214	2007 GS_{38}	—	November 4, 2004	Kitt Peak	Spacewatch	·	3.3 km	MPC; JPL
645215	2007 GQ_{41}	—	April 14, 2007	Kitt Peak	Spacewatch	·	630 m	MPC; JPL
645216	2007 GA_{49}	—	April 14, 2007	Kitt Peak	Spacewatch	NYS	760 m	MPC; JPL
645217	2007 GS_{50}	—	April 15, 2007	Kitt Peak	Spacewatch	·	540 m	MPC; JPL
645218	2007 GU_{50}	—	April 15, 2007	Catalina	CSS	·	1.1 km	MPC; JPL
645219	2007 GB_{56}	—	April 15, 2007	Kitt Peak	Spacewatch	·	2.0 km	MPC; JPL
645220	2007 GP_{56}	—	April 15, 2007	Kitt Peak	Spacewatch	·	1.5 km	MPC; JPL
645221	2007 GG_{58}	—	April 15, 2007	Kitt Peak	Spacewatch	·	580 m	MPC; JPL
645222	2007 GT_{66}	—	April 11, 2007	Mount Lemmon	Mount Lemmon Survey	·	960 m	MPC; JPL
645223	2007 GT_{77}	—	February 26, 2014	Mount Lemmon	Mount Lemmon Survey	·	700 m	MPC; JPL
645224	2007 GH_{78}	—	April 10, 2013	Haleakala	Pan-STARRS 1	(69559)	2.8 km	MPC; JPL
645225	2007 GT_{78}	—	January 27, 2015	Haleakala	Pan-STARRS 1	·	1.7 km	MPC; JPL
645226	2007 GA_{79}	—	February 14, 2012	Haleakala	Pan-STARRS 1	·	4.1 km	MPC; JPL
645227	2007 GS_{79}	—	April 13, 2018	Haleakala	Pan-STARRS 1	·	950 m	MPC; JPL
645228	2007 GT_{80}	—	April 7, 2007	Mount Lemmon	Mount Lemmon Survey	NYS	810 m	MPC; JPL
645229	2007 GU_{80}	—	July 28, 2008	Mount Lemmon	Mount Lemmon Survey	·	1.8 km	MPC; JPL
645230	2007 GD_{81}	—	April 14, 2007	Kitt Peak	Spacewatch	·	1.5 km	MPC; JPL
645231	2007 HX	—	March 15, 2007	Mount Lemmon	Mount Lemmon Survey	·	1.1 km	MPC; JPL
645232	2007 HQ_{9}	—	April 18, 2007	Mount Lemmon	Mount Lemmon Survey	·	1.8 km	MPC; JPL
645233	2007 HR_{14}	—	January 26, 2003	Kitt Peak	Spacewatch	·	990 m	MPC; JPL
645234	2007 HN_{18}	—	April 16, 2007	Mount Lemmon	Mount Lemmon Survey	·	760 m	MPC; JPL
645235	2007 HY_{20}	—	April 18, 2007	Kitt Peak	Spacewatch	·	1.5 km	MPC; JPL
645236	2007 HX_{22}	—	April 18, 2007	Kitt Peak	Spacewatch	·	3.0 km	MPC; JPL
645237	2007 HF_{33}	—	April 19, 2007	Kitt Peak	Spacewatch	·	510 m	MPC; JPL
645238	2007 HY_{37}	—	March 16, 2007	Kitt Peak	Spacewatch	·	640 m	MPC; JPL
645239	2007 HY_{39}	—	April 20, 2007	Mount Lemmon	Mount Lemmon Survey	·	4.0 km	MPC; JPL
645240	2007 HZ_{42}	—	April 22, 2007	Mount Lemmon	Mount Lemmon Survey	NYS	740 m	MPC; JPL
645241	2007 HD_{43}	—	April 22, 2007	Mount Lemmon	Mount Lemmon Survey	(21344)	1.4 km	MPC; JPL
645242	2007 HH_{53}	—	April 20, 2007	Kitt Peak	Spacewatch	·	1.9 km	MPC; JPL
645243	2007 HS_{57}	—	April 22, 2007	Mount Lemmon	Mount Lemmon Survey	·	2.0 km	MPC; JPL
645244	2007 HU_{59}	—	September 11, 2001	Kitt Peak	Spacewatch	V	520 m	MPC; JPL
645245	2007 HJ_{60}	—	September 11, 2004	Kitt Peak	Spacewatch	·	910 m	MPC; JPL
645246	2007 HC_{62}	—	March 13, 2007	Kitt Peak	Spacewatch	·	1.7 km	MPC; JPL
645247	2007 HE_{66}	—	April 22, 2007	Mount Lemmon	Mount Lemmon Survey	MRX	880 m	MPC; JPL
645248	2007 HJ_{67}	—	March 16, 2007	Kitt Peak	Spacewatch	HNS	1.2 km	MPC; JPL
645249	2007 HH_{68}	—	April 23, 2007	Kitt Peak	Spacewatch	·	1.5 km	MPC; JPL
645250	2007 HD_{72}	—	April 11, 2007	Mount Lemmon	Mount Lemmon Survey	·	1.5 km	MPC; JPL
645251	2007 HF_{79}	—	April 23, 2007	Mount Lemmon	Mount Lemmon Survey	·	2.9 km	MPC; JPL
645252	2007 HH_{79}	—	December 25, 2005	Mount Lemmon	Mount Lemmon Survey	·	2.5 km	MPC; JPL
645253	2007 HM_{81}	—	March 26, 2007	Mount Lemmon	Mount Lemmon Survey	·	1.7 km	MPC; JPL
645254	2007 HP_{84}	—	March 11, 2016	Haleakala	Pan-STARRS 1	·	1.4 km	MPC; JPL
645255	2007 HJ_{86}	—	April 24, 2007	Kitt Peak	Spacewatch	AEO	980 m	MPC; JPL
645256	2007 HZ_{86}	—	April 15, 2007	Kitt Peak	Spacewatch	·	780 m	MPC; JPL
645257	2007 HZ_{89}	—	March 5, 2002	Apache Point	SDSS Collaboration	·	1.5 km	MPC; JPL
645258	2007 HT_{91}	—	April 19, 2007	Kitt Peak	Spacewatch	·	580 m	MPC; JPL
645259	2007 HC_{100}	—	April 22, 2007	Mount Lemmon	Mount Lemmon Survey	·	500 m	MPC; JPL
645260	2007 HG_{100}	—	April 25, 2007	Mount Lemmon	Mount Lemmon Survey	DOR	1.9 km	MPC; JPL
645261	2007 HW_{100}	—	April 9, 2003	Kitt Peak	Spacewatch	·	1.7 km	MPC; JPL
645262	2007 HG_{101}	—	October 6, 2008	Mount Lemmon	Mount Lemmon Survey	·	710 m	MPC; JPL
645263	2007 HR_{101}	—	April 22, 2007	Kitt Peak	Spacewatch	NYS	1.2 km	MPC; JPL
645264	2007 HA_{102}	—	April 23, 2007	Mount Lemmon	Mount Lemmon Survey	·	1.3 km	MPC; JPL
645265	2007 HY_{102}	—	May 9, 2007	Mount Lemmon	Mount Lemmon Survey	·	1.8 km	MPC; JPL
645266	2007 HS_{103}	—	March 25, 2014	Kitt Peak	Spacewatch	·	560 m	MPC; JPL
645267	2007 HV_{103}	—	September 6, 2008	Mount Lemmon	Mount Lemmon Survey	·	880 m	MPC; JPL
645268	2007 HR_{104}	—	April 19, 2007	Kitt Peak	Spacewatch	·	800 m	MPC; JPL
645269	2007 HO_{105}	—	April 23, 2007	Mount Lemmon	Mount Lemmon Survey	·	1.0 km	MPC; JPL
645270	2007 HU_{105}	—	December 29, 2014	Haleakala	Pan-STARRS 1	WIT	840 m	MPC; JPL
645271	2007 HW_{105}	—	December 29, 2014	Haleakala	Pan-STARRS 1	·	1.9 km	MPC; JPL
645272	2007 HX_{105}	—	March 14, 2016	Mount Lemmon	Mount Lemmon Survey	·	1.8 km	MPC; JPL
645273	2007 HN_{107}	—	September 9, 2008	Mount Lemmon	Mount Lemmon Survey	·	750 m	MPC; JPL
645274	2007 HU_{107}	—	April 19, 2007	Kitt Peak	Spacewatch	·	2.0 km	MPC; JPL
645275	2007 HL_{108}	—	February 25, 2011	Mount Lemmon	Mount Lemmon Survey	·	1.4 km	MPC; JPL
645276	2007 HX_{108}	—	April 18, 2007	Kitt Peak	Spacewatch	·	640 m	MPC; JPL
645277	2007 HJ_{109}	—	March 10, 2016	Haleakala	Pan-STARRS 1	AGN	780 m	MPC; JPL
645278	2007 HP_{109}	—	February 8, 2011	Mount Lemmon	Mount Lemmon Survey	·	1.5 km	MPC; JPL
645279	2007 HQ_{109}	—	June 25, 2015	Haleakala	Pan-STARRS 1	·	950 m	MPC; JPL
645280	2007 HD_{110}	—	April 24, 2007	Kitt Peak	Spacewatch	GAL	1.2 km	MPC; JPL
645281	2007 HJ_{110}	—	April 25, 2007	Mount Lemmon	Mount Lemmon Survey	·	1.7 km	MPC; JPL
645282	2007 HL_{110}	—	April 23, 2007	Mount Lemmon	Mount Lemmon Survey	·	2.0 km	MPC; JPL
645283	2007 HR_{110}	—	April 22, 2007	Kitt Peak	Spacewatch	·	1.3 km	MPC; JPL
645284	2007 HT_{110}	—	April 19, 2007	Kitt Peak	Spacewatch	615	1.0 km	MPC; JPL
645285	2007 HZ_{110}	—	April 24, 2007	Mount Lemmon	Mount Lemmon Survey	JUN	980 m	MPC; JPL
645286	2007 HK_{111}	—	April 25, 2007	Mount Lemmon	Mount Lemmon Survey	·	1.7 km	MPC; JPL
645287	2007 HA_{114}	—	April 25, 2007	Mount Lemmon	Mount Lemmon Survey	GEF	1.1 km	MPC; JPL
645288	2007 JO_{1}	—	May 7, 2007	Kitt Peak	Spacewatch	PHO	770 m	MPC; JPL
645289	2007 JA_{6}	—	May 9, 2007	Mount Lemmon	Mount Lemmon Survey	·	1.8 km	MPC; JPL
645290	2007 JU_{6}	—	April 15, 2007	Kitt Peak	Spacewatch	HOF	2.3 km	MPC; JPL
645291	2007 JQ_{7}	—	April 19, 2007	Kitt Peak	Spacewatch	·	1.7 km	MPC; JPL
645292	2007 JY_{15}	—	May 10, 2007	Mount Lemmon	Mount Lemmon Survey	·	1.8 km	MPC; JPL
645293	2007 JK_{21}	—	August 25, 2004	Kitt Peak	Spacewatch	V	640 m	MPC; JPL
645294	2007 JV_{23}	—	April 25, 2007	Mount Lemmon	Mount Lemmon Survey	PHO	600 m	MPC; JPL
645295	2007 JM_{30}	—	May 11, 2007	Mount Lemmon	Mount Lemmon Survey	·	1.1 km	MPC; JPL
645296	2007 JR_{31}	—	September 28, 2003	Kitt Peak	Spacewatch	·	3.6 km	MPC; JPL
645297	2007 JV_{31}	—	May 12, 2007	Mount Lemmon	Mount Lemmon Survey	·	1.3 km	MPC; JPL
645298	2007 JS_{36}	—	March 15, 2007	Kitt Peak	Spacewatch	·	890 m	MPC; JPL
645299	2007 JJ_{37}	—	December 5, 2005	Mount Lemmon	Mount Lemmon Survey	·	1.8 km	MPC; JPL
645300	2007 JS_{37}	—	May 12, 2007	Mount Lemmon	Mount Lemmon Survey	·	1.5 km	MPC; JPL

== 645301–645400 ==
back to top

Designation			Discovery			Properties		Ref
Permanent	Provisional	Named after	Date	Site	Discoverer(s)	Category	Diam.	Ref
645301	2007 JQ_{41}	—	May 12, 2007	Mount Lemmon	Mount Lemmon Survey	PAD	1.3 km	MPC; JPL
645302	2007 JC_{44}	—	May 16, 2007	Mount Lemmon	Mount Lemmon Survey	DOR	2.3 km	MPC; JPL
645303	2007 JB_{46}	—	May 10, 2007	Mount Lemmon	Mount Lemmon Survey	·	510 m	MPC; JPL
645304	2007 JS_{47}	—	May 4, 2014	Mount Lemmon	Mount Lemmon Survey	·	610 m	MPC; JPL
645305	2007 JW_{47}	—	April 4, 2014	Kitt Peak	Spacewatch	·	770 m	MPC; JPL
645306	2007 JX_{47}	—	August 21, 2015	Haleakala	Pan-STARRS 1	·	1.1 km	MPC; JPL
645307	2007 JN_{50}	—	April 5, 2014	Haleakala	Pan-STARRS 1	·	900 m	MPC; JPL
645308	2007 JC_{51}	—	April 5, 2011	Kitt Peak	Spacewatch	·	870 m	MPC; JPL
645309	2007 KC_{8}	—	April 22, 2007	Catalina	CSS	·	1.6 km	MPC; JPL
645310	2007 LX	—	June 9, 2007	Catalina	CSS	·	3.3 km	MPC; JPL
645311	2007 LZ_{2}	—	May 13, 2007	Kitt Peak	Spacewatch	·	2.1 km	MPC; JPL
645312	2007 LM_{4}	—	May 26, 2007	Mount Lemmon	Mount Lemmon Survey	·	2.0 km	MPC; JPL
645313	2007 LX_{4}	—	November 4, 1991	Kitt Peak	Spacewatch	(5)	1.2 km	MPC; JPL
645314	2007 LG_{12}	—	June 9, 2007	Kitt Peak	Spacewatch	PAD	1.6 km	MPC; JPL
645315	2007 LW_{28}	—	June 15, 2007	Kitt Peak	Spacewatch	·	1.8 km	MPC; JPL
645316	2007 LM_{38}	—	February 28, 2014	Haleakala	Pan-STARRS 1	·	660 m	MPC; JPL
645317	2007 LS_{39}	—	March 12, 2010	Kitt Peak	Spacewatch	NYS	890 m	MPC; JPL
645318	2007 MO_{2}	—	June 16, 2007	Kitt Peak	Spacewatch	MAR	1.0 km	MPC; JPL
645319	2007 MJ_{3}	—	June 16, 2007	Kitt Peak	Spacewatch	·	1.1 km	MPC; JPL
645320	2007 MG_{5}	—	June 17, 2007	Kitt Peak	Spacewatch	·	1.9 km	MPC; JPL
645321	2007 MB_{8}	—	June 18, 2007	Kitt Peak	Spacewatch	·	990 m	MPC; JPL
645322	2007 MP_{8}	—	September 18, 2003	Kitt Peak	Spacewatch	·	2.1 km	MPC; JPL
645323	2007 MW_{8}	—	May 15, 2007	Mount Lemmon	Mount Lemmon Survey	H	420 m	MPC; JPL
645324	2007 MH_{17}	—	June 21, 2007	Mount Lemmon	Mount Lemmon Survey	·	2.1 km	MPC; JPL
645325	2007 MZ_{24}	—	June 23, 2007	Kitt Peak	Spacewatch	·	1.1 km	MPC; JPL
645326	2007 NW_{7}	—	July 10, 2007	Siding Spring	SSS	·	1.4 km	MPC; JPL
645327	2007 OH_{10}	—	July 18, 2007	Mount Lemmon	Mount Lemmon Survey	·	2.3 km	MPC; JPL
645328	2007 OT_{11}	—	December 23, 2016	Haleakala	Pan-STARRS 1	PHO	1.1 km	MPC; JPL
645329	2007 PX_{4}	—	August 9, 2007	Kitt Peak	Spacewatch	L4	7.1 km	MPC; JPL
645330	2007 PG_{11}	—	August 13, 2007	Pla D'Arguines	R. Ferrando, Ferrando, M.	·	1.1 km	MPC; JPL
645331	2007 PT_{17}	—	April 11, 2003	Kitt Peak	Spacewatch	·	1.1 km	MPC; JPL
645332	2007 PA_{22}	—	August 10, 2007	Kitt Peak	Spacewatch	DOR	2.2 km	MPC; JPL
645333	2007 PZ_{27}	—	August 14, 2007	Tiki	Teamo, N., S. F. Hönig	·	1.7 km	MPC; JPL
645334	2007 PK_{36}	—	July 8, 2007	Lulin	LUSS	·	1.3 km	MPC; JPL
645335	2007 PL_{51}	—	August 10, 2007	Kitt Peak	Spacewatch	EOS	1.6 km	MPC; JPL
645336	2007 PT_{51}	—	October 1, 2008	Mount Lemmon	Mount Lemmon Survey	·	1.5 km	MPC; JPL
645337	2007 PU_{51}	—	August 10, 2007	Kitt Peak	Spacewatch	·	1.1 km	MPC; JPL
645338	2007 PF_{52}	—	August 6, 2007	Lulin	LUSS	·	1.9 km	MPC; JPL
645339	2007 PO_{52}	—	January 26, 2012	Haleakala	Pan-STARRS 1	L4	6.9 km	MPC; JPL
645340	2007 PC_{53}	—	August 25, 2012	Kitt Peak	Spacewatch	·	2.0 km	MPC; JPL
645341	2007 PO_{53}	—	August 10, 2007	Kitt Peak	Spacewatch	·	1.4 km	MPC; JPL
645342	2007 PY_{53}	—	August 10, 2007	Kitt Peak	Spacewatch	·	1.6 km	MPC; JPL
645343	2007 PP_{55}	—	August 10, 2007	Kitt Peak	Spacewatch	·	930 m	MPC; JPL
645344	2007 QH_{19}	—	August 24, 2007	Kitt Peak	Spacewatch	NYS	960 m	MPC; JPL
645345	2007 QJ_{20}	—	August 21, 2007	Siding Spring	SSS	·	1.6 km	MPC; JPL
645346	2007 RK_{5}	—	September 2, 2007	Siding Spring	K. Sárneczky, L. Kiss	·	1.7 km	MPC; JPL
645347	2007 RJ_{9}	—	September 2, 2007	Siding Spring	K. Sárneczky, L. Kiss	·	850 m	MPC; JPL
645348	2007 RP_{39}	—	September 8, 2007	Andrushivka	Gerashchenko, O.	THM	2.8 km	MPC; JPL
645349	2007 RH_{42}	—	September 9, 2007	Kitt Peak	Spacewatch	·	1.1 km	MPC; JPL
645350	2007 RY_{42}	—	September 9, 2007	Kitt Peak	Spacewatch	·	1.3 km	MPC; JPL
645351	2007 RA_{44}	—	September 9, 2007	Kitt Peak	Spacewatch	EOS	1.6 km	MPC; JPL
645352	2007 RG_{44}	—	September 9, 2007	Kitt Peak	Spacewatch	·	1.0 km	MPC; JPL
645353	2007 RP_{44}	—	September 9, 2007	Kitt Peak	Spacewatch	EMA	2.1 km	MPC; JPL
645354	2007 RV_{53}	—	September 9, 2007	Kitt Peak	Spacewatch	·	1.3 km	MPC; JPL
645355	2007 RE_{55}	—	September 9, 2007	Kitt Peak	Spacewatch	·	1.5 km	MPC; JPL
645356	2007 RC_{63}	—	August 10, 2007	Kitt Peak	Spacewatch	·	1 km	MPC; JPL
645357	2007 RQ_{63}	—	December 2, 2005	Mauna Kea	A. Boattini	V	570 m	MPC; JPL
645358	2007 RT_{65}	—	September 10, 2007	Mount Lemmon	Mount Lemmon Survey	MAS	650 m	MPC; JPL
645359	2007 RU_{66}	—	August 10, 2007	Kitt Peak	Spacewatch	·	1.3 km	MPC; JPL
645360	2007 RW_{69}	—	September 10, 2007	Kitt Peak	Spacewatch	·	1.4 km	MPC; JPL
645361	2007 RZ_{70}	—	September 10, 2007	Kitt Peak	Spacewatch	·	880 m	MPC; JPL
645362	2007 RR_{72}	—	September 10, 2007	Mount Lemmon	Mount Lemmon Survey	·	2.0 km	MPC; JPL
645363	2007 RM_{79}	—	August 10, 2007	Kitt Peak	Spacewatch	·	1.0 km	MPC; JPL
645364	2007 RO_{79}	—	September 10, 2007	Mount Lemmon	Mount Lemmon Survey	MAS	620 m	MPC; JPL
645365	2007 RS_{79}	—	September 10, 2007	Mount Lemmon	Mount Lemmon Survey	KOR	1.1 km	MPC; JPL
645366	2007 RT_{84}	—	August 10, 2007	Kitt Peak	Spacewatch	·	1.0 km	MPC; JPL
645367	2007 RK_{89}	—	September 10, 2007	Mount Lemmon	Mount Lemmon Survey	KOR	1.3 km	MPC; JPL
645368	2007 RF_{91}	—	September 10, 2007	Mount Lemmon	Mount Lemmon Survey	KOR	1.3 km	MPC; JPL
645369	2007 RG_{93}	—	September 10, 2007	Kitt Peak	Spacewatch	·	710 m	MPC; JPL
645370	2007 RU_{93}	—	September 10, 2007	Kitt Peak	Spacewatch	KOR	1.1 km	MPC; JPL
645371	2007 RL_{100}	—	September 11, 2007	Mount Lemmon	Mount Lemmon Survey	NYS	880 m	MPC; JPL
645372	2007 RO_{112}	—	September 11, 2007	Kitt Peak	Spacewatch	TRE	2.0 km	MPC; JPL
645373	2007 RN_{114}	—	September 11, 2007	Kitt Peak	Spacewatch	TEL	1.0 km	MPC; JPL
645374	2007 RB_{120}	—	September 11, 2007	Lulin	LUSS	·	600 m	MPC; JPL
645375	2007 RC_{123}	—	September 12, 2007	Mount Lemmon	Mount Lemmon Survey	·	1.4 km	MPC; JPL
645376	2007 RD_{125}	—	September 12, 2007	Mount Lemmon	Mount Lemmon Survey	·	1.7 km	MPC; JPL
645377	2007 RC_{131}	—	September 12, 2007	Kitt Peak	Spacewatch	·	1.7 km	MPC; JPL
645378	2007 RW_{131}	—	September 12, 2007	Mount Lemmon	Mount Lemmon Survey	·	990 m	MPC; JPL
645379	2007 RV_{132}	—	September 13, 2007	Altschwendt	W. Ries	·	1.6 km	MPC; JPL
645380	2007 RK_{139}	—	September 3, 2007	Catalina	CSS	·	2.7 km	MPC; JPL
645381	2007 RX_{152}	—	September 10, 2007	Kitt Peak	Spacewatch	·	1.2 km	MPC; JPL
645382	2007 RX_{153}	—	August 24, 2007	Kitt Peak	Spacewatch	·	910 m	MPC; JPL
645383	2007 RS_{156}	—	September 10, 2007	Mount Lemmon	Mount Lemmon Survey	NYS	860 m	MPC; JPL
645384	2007 RP_{160}	—	September 12, 2007	Mount Lemmon	Mount Lemmon Survey	·	1.6 km	MPC; JPL
645385	2007 RN_{161}	—	September 13, 2007	Mount Lemmon	Mount Lemmon Survey	·	1.9 km	MPC; JPL
645386	2007 RX_{165}	—	September 10, 2007	Kitt Peak	Spacewatch	·	800 m	MPC; JPL
645387	2007 RL_{169}	—	September 10, 2007	Kitt Peak	Spacewatch	·	1.3 km	MPC; JPL
645388	2007 RW_{171}	—	September 10, 2007	Kitt Peak	Spacewatch	·	1.6 km	MPC; JPL
645389	2007 RO_{183}	—	September 12, 2007	Mount Lemmon	Mount Lemmon Survey	·	1.8 km	MPC; JPL
645390	2007 RN_{184}	—	September 13, 2007	Catalina	CSS	·	1.3 km	MPC; JPL
645391	2007 RC_{187}	—	September 13, 2007	Mount Lemmon	Mount Lemmon Survey	·	990 m	MPC; JPL
645392	2007 RS_{188}	—	September 10, 2007	Kitt Peak	Spacewatch	·	1.5 km	MPC; JPL
645393	2007 RA_{191}	—	September 11, 2007	Kitt Peak	Spacewatch	·	590 m	MPC; JPL
645394	2007 RO_{192}	—	September 12, 2007	Anderson Mesa	LONEOS	·	1.2 km	MPC; JPL
645395	2007 RR_{195}	—	October 23, 2004	Kitt Peak	Spacewatch	·	570 m	MPC; JPL
645396	2007 RJ_{198}	—	September 13, 2007	Mount Lemmon	Mount Lemmon Survey	L4	6.3 km	MPC; JPL
645397	2007 RL_{198}	—	September 13, 2007	Mount Lemmon	Mount Lemmon Survey	L4	8.0 km	MPC; JPL
645398	2007 RA_{201}	—	September 13, 2007	Kitt Peak	Spacewatch	NYS	1.1 km	MPC; JPL
645399	2007 RF_{203}	—	September 13, 2007	Kitt Peak	Spacewatch	·	1.0 km	MPC; JPL
645400	2007 RD_{207}	—	September 10, 2007	Kitt Peak	Spacewatch	KOR	1.3 km	MPC; JPL

== 645401–645500 ==
back to top

Designation			Discovery			Properties		Ref
Permanent	Provisional	Named after	Date	Site	Discoverer(s)	Category	Diam.	Ref
645401	2007 RN_{208}	—	September 10, 2007	Kitt Peak	Spacewatch	·	1.6 km	MPC; JPL
645402	2007 RC_{209}	—	September 10, 2007	Kitt Peak	Spacewatch	NYS	1.1 km	MPC; JPL
645403	2007 RZ_{217}	—	September 13, 2007	Mount Lemmon	Mount Lemmon Survey	·	2.0 km	MPC; JPL
645404	2007 RU_{218}	—	September 14, 2007	Mount Lemmon	Mount Lemmon Survey	·	1.0 km	MPC; JPL
645405	2007 RD_{225}	—	August 23, 2007	Kitt Peak	Spacewatch	·	790 m	MPC; JPL
645406	2007 RX_{237}	—	September 14, 2007	Kitt Peak	Spacewatch	·	1.7 km	MPC; JPL
645407	2007 RM_{242}	—	September 9, 2007	Anderson Mesa	LONEOS	·	2.0 km	MPC; JPL
645408	2007 RV_{242}	—	May 26, 2003	Haleakala	NEAT	ERI	1.6 km	MPC; JPL
645409	2007 RQ_{243}	—	September 13, 2007	Catalina	CSS	H	520 m	MPC; JPL
645410	2007 RH_{248}	—	September 13, 2007	Mount Lemmon	Mount Lemmon Survey	·	1.7 km	MPC; JPL
645411	2007 RF_{249}	—	September 13, 2007	Mount Lemmon	Mount Lemmon Survey	·	1.9 km	MPC; JPL
645412	2007 RS_{250}	—	September 13, 2007	Kitt Peak	Spacewatch	·	2.1 km	MPC; JPL
645413	2007 RA_{251}	—	September 9, 2007	Kitt Peak	Spacewatch	3:2	4.2 km	MPC; JPL
645414	2007 RG_{251}	—	September 13, 2007	Kitt Peak	Spacewatch	·	960 m	MPC; JPL
645415	2007 RP_{258}	—	September 14, 2007	Kitt Peak	Spacewatch	·	1.8 km	MPC; JPL
645416	2007 RL_{262}	—	September 15, 2007	Kitt Peak	Spacewatch	·	1.3 km	MPC; JPL
645417	2007 RA_{264}	—	September 15, 2007	Mount Lemmon	Mount Lemmon Survey	NYS	960 m	MPC; JPL
645418	2007 RU_{267}	—	September 15, 2007	Kitt Peak	Spacewatch	·	1.1 km	MPC; JPL
645419	2007 RZ_{267}	—	September 15, 2007	Kitt Peak	Spacewatch	MAS	690 m	MPC; JPL
645420	2007 RC_{274}	—	September 15, 2007	Kitt Peak	Spacewatch	·	2.0 km	MPC; JPL
645421	2007 RM_{275}	—	September 6, 2007	Siding Spring	SSS	T_{j} (2.84)	5.7 km	MPC; JPL
645422	2007 RV_{282}	—	January 26, 2006	Kitt Peak	Spacewatch	·	1.9 km	MPC; JPL
645423	2007 RO_{286}	—	September 4, 2007	Mount Lemmon	Mount Lemmon Survey	·	2.0 km	MPC; JPL
645424	2007 RT_{295}	—	September 14, 2007	Kitt Peak	Spacewatch	·	1.3 km	MPC; JPL
645425	2007 RU_{296}	—	September 15, 2007	Mount Lemmon	Mount Lemmon Survey	·	2.5 km	MPC; JPL
645426	2007 RY_{296}	—	September 9, 2007	Kitt Peak	Spacewatch	·	1.8 km	MPC; JPL
645427	2007 RM_{297}	—	September 10, 2007	Kitt Peak	Spacewatch	·	1.4 km	MPC; JPL
645428	2007 RK_{298}	—	September 9, 2007	Kitt Peak	Spacewatch	·	1.7 km	MPC; JPL
645429	2007 RW_{300}	—	September 12, 2007	Mount Lemmon	Mount Lemmon Survey	MAS	620 m	MPC; JPL
645430	2007 RJ_{327}	—	September 13, 2007	Kitt Peak	Spacewatch	·	1.8 km	MPC; JPL
645431	2007 RX_{328}	—	September 12, 2007	Mount Lemmon	Mount Lemmon Survey	·	1.8 km	MPC; JPL
645432	2007 RA_{329}	—	September 13, 2007	Mount Lemmon	Mount Lemmon Survey	·	1.5 km	MPC; JPL
645433	2007 RU_{329}	—	September 8, 2007	Mount Lemmon	Mount Lemmon Survey	H	420 m	MPC; JPL
645434	2007 RB_{330}	—	September 10, 2007	Mount Lemmon	Mount Lemmon Survey	KOR	940 m	MPC; JPL
645435	2007 RQ_{332}	—	September 14, 2007	Mount Lemmon	Mount Lemmon Survey	·	1.5 km	MPC; JPL
645436	2007 RE_{333}	—	October 11, 2012	Mount Lemmon	Mount Lemmon Survey	·	1.8 km	MPC; JPL
645437	2007 RR_{333}	—	September 12, 2007	Catalina	CSS	·	1.3 km	MPC; JPL
645438	2007 RT_{335}	—	September 13, 2007	Mount Lemmon	Mount Lemmon Survey	·	1.5 km	MPC; JPL
645439	2007 RC_{336}	—	September 4, 2011	Haleakala	Pan-STARRS 1	·	960 m	MPC; JPL
645440	2007 RM_{336}	—	March 27, 2015	Haleakala	Pan-STARRS 1	·	1.7 km	MPC; JPL
645441	2007 RT_{336}	—	August 16, 2017	Haleakala	Pan-STARRS 1	·	1.1 km	MPC; JPL
645442	2007 RY_{336}	—	September 18, 2012	Mount Lemmon	Mount Lemmon Survey	·	1.5 km	MPC; JPL
645443	2007 RB_{337}	—	September 10, 2007	Mount Lemmon	Mount Lemmon Survey	·	1.1 km	MPC; JPL
645444	2007 RU_{339}	—	September 21, 2011	Kitt Peak	Spacewatch	V	610 m	MPC; JPL
645445	2007 RV_{339}	—	September 11, 2007	Catalina	CSS	·	2.0 km	MPC; JPL
645446	2007 RK_{340}	—	September 10, 2007	Mount Lemmon	Mount Lemmon Survey	·	2.1 km	MPC; JPL
645447	2007 RN_{340}	—	January 9, 2014	Haleakala	Pan-STARRS 1	·	1.5 km	MPC; JPL
645448	2007 RD_{341}	—	December 21, 2008	Mount Lemmon	Mount Lemmon Survey	·	1.6 km	MPC; JPL
645449	2007 RE_{341}	—	January 30, 2017	Haleakala	Pan-STARRS 1	·	900 m	MPC; JPL
645450	2007 RS_{341}	—	September 10, 2007	Mount Lemmon	Mount Lemmon Survey	·	1.8 km	MPC; JPL
645451	2007 RY_{341}	—	September 11, 2007	Mount Lemmon	Mount Lemmon Survey	MAS	590 m	MPC; JPL
645452	2007 RA_{343}	—	September 10, 2007	Kitt Peak	Spacewatch	·	930 m	MPC; JPL
645453	2007 RD_{343}	—	October 7, 2012	Haleakala	Pan-STARRS 1	·	2.5 km	MPC; JPL
645454	2007 RN_{343}	—	August 24, 2017	Haleakala	Pan-STARRS 1	EOS	1.4 km	MPC; JPL
645455	2007 RW_{344}	—	September 11, 2007	Mount Lemmon	Mount Lemmon Survey	EOS	1.3 km	MPC; JPL
645456	2007 RH_{345}	—	September 14, 2007	Mount Lemmon	Mount Lemmon Survey	EOS	1.6 km	MPC; JPL
645457	2007 RF_{347}	—	March 18, 2015	Haleakala	Pan-STARRS 1	KOR	1.1 km	MPC; JPL
645458	2007 RP_{347}	—	September 15, 2017	Haleakala	Pan-STARRS 1	KOR	1.1 km	MPC; JPL
645459	2007 RU_{347}	—	September 12, 2007	Kitt Peak	Spacewatch	·	2.0 km	MPC; JPL
645460	2007 RX_{347}	—	February 18, 2015	Haleakala	Pan-STARRS 1	L4	7.3 km	MPC; JPL
645461	2007 RD_{348}	—	November 10, 2009	Mount Lemmon	Mount Lemmon Survey	L4	6.7 km	MPC; JPL
645462	2007 RN_{348}	—	August 26, 2012	Haleakala	Pan-STARRS 1	·	1.4 km	MPC; JPL
645463	2007 RW_{348}	—	June 24, 2017	Haleakala	Pan-STARRS 1	EOS	1.5 km	MPC; JPL
645464	2007 RX_{348}	—	September 10, 2007	Mount Lemmon	Mount Lemmon Survey	KOR	1.0 km	MPC; JPL
645465	2007 RG_{351}	—	September 23, 2012	Mount Lemmon	Mount Lemmon Survey	·	1.4 km	MPC; JPL
645466	2007 RA_{352}	—	September 11, 2007	Mount Lemmon	Mount Lemmon Survey	·	1.3 km	MPC; JPL
645467	2007 RC_{352}	—	October 4, 2018	Haleakala	Pan-STARRS 2	·	1.5 km	MPC; JPL
645468	2007 RK_{353}	—	September 15, 2007	Kitt Peak	Spacewatch	·	1.3 km	MPC; JPL
645469	2007 RN_{353}	—	September 13, 2007	Mount Lemmon	Mount Lemmon Survey	·	1.5 km	MPC; JPL
645470	2007 RP_{354}	—	September 5, 2007	Mount Lemmon	Mount Lemmon Survey	·	1.2 km	MPC; JPL
645471	2007 RZ_{354}	—	September 9, 2007	Kitt Peak	Spacewatch	·	1.6 km	MPC; JPL
645472	2007 RB_{356}	—	September 11, 2007	Kitt Peak	Spacewatch	L4	7.2 km	MPC; JPL
645473	2007 RU_{356}	—	September 14, 2007	Mount Lemmon	Mount Lemmon Survey	·	1.5 km	MPC; JPL
645474	2007 RZ_{356}	—	September 9, 2007	Kitt Peak	Spacewatch	EOS	1.4 km	MPC; JPL
645475	2007 RP_{357}	—	January 16, 2005	Mauna Kea	Veillet, C.	·	1.1 km	MPC; JPL
645476	2007 RO_{365}	—	September 14, 2007	Kitt Peak	Spacewatch	·	1.6 km	MPC; JPL
645477	2007 RN_{370}	—	September 12, 2007	Mount Lemmon	Mount Lemmon Survey	EOS	1.4 km	MPC; JPL
645478	2007 RJ_{371}	—	September 14, 2007	Kitt Peak	Spacewatch	3:2	3.9 km	MPC; JPL
645479	2007 RT_{371}	—	September 13, 2007	Mount Lemmon	Mount Lemmon Survey	·	880 m	MPC; JPL
645480	2007 RX_{377}	—	September 10, 2007	Kitt Peak	Spacewatch	L4	5.9 km	MPC; JPL
645481	2007 RE_{383}	—	September 10, 2007	Mount Lemmon	Mount Lemmon Survey	·	1.3 km	MPC; JPL
645482	2007 SE_{6}	—	September 15, 2007	Kitt Peak	Spacewatch	NYS	1.1 km	MPC; JPL
645483	2007 SU_{8}	—	September 18, 2007	Kitt Peak	Spacewatch	·	1.9 km	MPC; JPL
645484	2007 SX_{9}	—	September 18, 2007	Kitt Peak	Spacewatch	·	1.9 km	MPC; JPL
645485	2007 SK_{26}	—	January 27, 2017	Haleakala	Pan-STARRS 1	·	980 m	MPC; JPL
645486	2007 SL_{26}	—	September 26, 2007	Mount Lemmon	Mount Lemmon Survey	·	2.3 km	MPC; JPL
645487	2007 SN_{27}	—	October 8, 2008	Kitt Peak	Spacewatch	L4	7.4 km	MPC; JPL
645488	2007 SR_{27}	—	September 19, 2007	Kitt Peak	Spacewatch	EOS	1.4 km	MPC; JPL
645489	2007 TG	—	October 1, 2007	Gaisberg	Gierlinger, R.	·	1.9 km	MPC; JPL
645490	2007 TP	—	September 14, 2007	Mount Lemmon	Mount Lemmon Survey	·	940 m	MPC; JPL
645491	2007 TA_{1}	—	September 13, 2007	Mount Lemmon	Mount Lemmon Survey	·	990 m	MPC; JPL
645492	2007 TB_{3}	—	October 5, 2007	Prairie Grass	Mahony, J.	·	1.6 km	MPC; JPL
645493	2007 TV_{12}	—	October 6, 2007	Kitt Peak	Spacewatch	·	1.8 km	MPC; JPL
645494	2007 TB_{21}	—	October 9, 2007	Dauban	F. Kugel, C. Rinner	·	2.0 km	MPC; JPL
645495	2007 TB_{22}	—	September 18, 2007	Anderson Mesa	LONEOS	·	730 m	MPC; JPL
645496	2007 TX_{25}	—	October 4, 2007	Kitt Peak	Spacewatch	·	1.8 km	MPC; JPL
645497	2007 TQ_{27}	—	September 12, 2007	Mount Lemmon	Mount Lemmon Survey	·	2.3 km	MPC; JPL
645498	2007 TO_{32}	—	October 6, 2007	Kitt Peak	Spacewatch	·	1.9 km	MPC; JPL
645499	2007 TO_{36}	—	October 4, 2007	Kitt Peak	Spacewatch	MAS	700 m	MPC; JPL
645500	2007 TD_{37}	—	September 14, 2007	Mount Lemmon	Mount Lemmon Survey	·	1.8 km	MPC; JPL

== 645501–645600 ==
back to top

Designation			Discovery			Properties		Ref
Permanent	Provisional	Named after	Date	Site	Discoverer(s)	Category	Diam.	Ref
645501	2007 TQ_{38}	—	October 7, 2007	Mount Lemmon	Mount Lemmon Survey	·	1.9 km	MPC; JPL
645502	2007 TW_{42}	—	September 12, 2007	Kitt Peak	Spacewatch	·	1.9 km	MPC; JPL
645503	2007 TE_{45}	—	October 7, 2007	Mount Lemmon	Mount Lemmon Survey	·	1.6 km	MPC; JPL
645504	2007 TX_{59}	—	October 5, 2007	Kitt Peak	Spacewatch	·	1.6 km	MPC; JPL
645505	2007 TL_{60}	—	October 6, 2007	Kitt Peak	Spacewatch	EOS	1.3 km	MPC; JPL
645506	2007 TZ_{71}	—	October 12, 2007	Mount Lemmon	Mount Lemmon Survey	·	2.5 km	MPC; JPL
645507	2007 TC_{77}	—	October 5, 2007	Kitt Peak	Spacewatch	·	1.8 km	MPC; JPL
645508	2007 TX_{77}	—	October 5, 2007	Kitt Peak	Spacewatch	AGN	1.0 km	MPC; JPL
645509	2007 TS_{85}	—	November 2, 2002	La Palma	A. Fitzsimmons	·	1.7 km	MPC; JPL
645510	2007 TQ_{90}	—	October 8, 2007	Mount Lemmon	Mount Lemmon Survey	EOS	1.6 km	MPC; JPL
645511	2007 TV_{97}	—	March 25, 2006	Kitt Peak	Spacewatch	·	970 m	MPC; JPL
645512	2007 TZ_{97}	—	September 11, 2007	Mount Lemmon	Mount Lemmon Survey	PHO	820 m	MPC; JPL
645513	2007 TT_{99}	—	October 8, 2007	Mount Lemmon	Mount Lemmon Survey	·	1.5 km	MPC; JPL
645514	2007 TU_{99}	—	September 10, 2007	Kitt Peak	Spacewatch	MAS	560 m	MPC; JPL
645515	2007 TL_{100}	—	October 8, 2007	Mount Lemmon	Mount Lemmon Survey	EOS	1.4 km	MPC; JPL
645516	2007 TC_{106}	—	October 11, 2007	Catalina	CSS	·	1.7 km	MPC; JPL
645517	2007 TT_{107}	—	September 9, 2007	Mount Lemmon	Mount Lemmon Survey	·	1.0 km	MPC; JPL
645518	2007 TQ_{117}	—	October 9, 2007	Kitt Peak	Spacewatch	·	1.6 km	MPC; JPL
645519	2007 TZ_{118}	—	October 9, 2007	Mount Lemmon	Mount Lemmon Survey	·	1.7 km	MPC; JPL
645520	2007 TU_{122}	—	October 6, 2007	Kitt Peak	Spacewatch	·	840 m	MPC; JPL
645521	2007 TT_{133}	—	September 15, 2007	Mount Lemmon	Mount Lemmon Survey	·	480 m	MPC; JPL
645522	2007 TY_{134}	—	October 8, 2007	Kitt Peak	Spacewatch	·	1.9 km	MPC; JPL
645523	2007 TM_{147}	—	September 10, 2007	Kitt Peak	Spacewatch	·	2.2 km	MPC; JPL
645524	2007 TT_{157}	—	October 11, 2007	Kitt Peak	Spacewatch	EOS	1.9 km	MPC; JPL
645525	2007 TY_{162}	—	September 12, 2007	Mount Lemmon	Mount Lemmon Survey	DOR	2.1 km	MPC; JPL
645526	2007 TT_{179}	—	October 7, 2007	Mount Lemmon	Mount Lemmon Survey	·	1.9 km	MPC; JPL
645527	2007 TA_{180}	—	October 7, 2007	Mount Lemmon	Mount Lemmon Survey	·	1.0 km	MPC; JPL
645528	2007 TF_{181}	—	October 8, 2007	Anderson Mesa	LONEOS	JUN	1.0 km	MPC; JPL
645529	2007 TZ_{181}	—	September 15, 2007	Lulin	LUSS	H	520 m	MPC; JPL
645530 Patrickstewart	2007 TB_{185}	Patrickstewart	October 13, 2007	Radebeul	M. Fiedler	T_{j} (2.95) · 3:2	4.2 km	MPC; JPL
645531	2007 TZ_{189}	—	September 3, 2007	Catalina	CSS	·	1.5 km	MPC; JPL
645532	2007 TJ_{190}	—	March 2, 2006	Kitt Peak	Spacewatch	MAS	710 m	MPC; JPL
645533	2007 TH_{197}	—	August 10, 2007	Kitt Peak	Spacewatch	·	1.3 km	MPC; JPL
645534	2007 TN_{207}	—	October 10, 2007	Mount Lemmon	Mount Lemmon Survey	TEL	1 km	MPC; JPL
645535	2007 TW_{209}	—	October 11, 2007	Mount Lemmon	Mount Lemmon Survey	·	2.1 km	MPC; JPL
645536	2007 TA_{215}	—	October 7, 2007	Kitt Peak	Spacewatch	·	2.3 km	MPC; JPL
645537	2007 TD_{218}	—	October 7, 2007	Kitt Peak	Spacewatch	·	2.0 km	MPC; JPL
645538	2007 TM_{227}	—	October 8, 2007	Kitt Peak	Spacewatch	·	1.7 km	MPC; JPL
645539	2007 TB_{229}	—	October 8, 2007	Kitt Peak	Spacewatch	·	2.3 km	MPC; JPL
645540	2007 TW_{236}	—	April 14, 2002	Palomar	NEAT	V	820 m	MPC; JPL
645541	2007 TU_{237}	—	August 10, 2007	Kitt Peak	Spacewatch	·	1.3 km	MPC; JPL
645542	2007 TJ_{242}	—	September 18, 2007	Catalina	CSS	·	2.4 km	MPC; JPL
645543	2007 TY_{252}	—	May 1, 2006	Kitt Peak	Spacewatch	·	1.5 km	MPC; JPL
645544	2007 TN_{256}	—	October 10, 2007	Kitt Peak	Spacewatch	·	1.2 km	MPC; JPL
645545	2007 TO_{259}	—	October 10, 2007	Mount Lemmon	Mount Lemmon Survey	·	1.3 km	MPC; JPL
645546	2007 TJ_{260}	—	March 17, 2005	Kitt Peak	Spacewatch	KOR	1.2 km	MPC; JPL
645547	2007 TK_{261}	—	April 17, 2005	Kitt Peak	Spacewatch	(16286)	1.9 km	MPC; JPL
645548	2007 TO_{261}	—	October 10, 2007	Kitt Peak	Spacewatch	·	1.4 km	MPC; JPL
645549	2007 TZ_{264}	—	October 11, 2007	Kitt Peak	Spacewatch	·	1.3 km	MPC; JPL
645550	2007 TU_{265}	—	September 21, 2003	Palomar	NEAT	·	1.5 km	MPC; JPL
645551	2007 TG_{273}	—	October 10, 2007	Kitt Peak	Spacewatch	·	2.1 km	MPC; JPL
645552	2007 TD_{274}	—	October 10, 2007	Mount Lemmon	Mount Lemmon Survey	NYS	870 m	MPC; JPL
645553	2007 TP_{274}	—	March 23, 2006	Kitt Peak	Spacewatch	·	1.1 km	MPC; JPL
645554	2007 TN_{276}	—	February 16, 2004	Kitt Peak	Spacewatch	EOS	1.5 km	MPC; JPL
645555	2007 TB_{278}	—	October 11, 2007	Mount Lemmon	Mount Lemmon Survey	·	1.6 km	MPC; JPL
645556	2007 TW_{278}	—	September 20, 2007	Catalina	CSS	·	1.7 km	MPC; JPL
645557	2007 TA_{279}	—	October 11, 2007	Mount Lemmon	Mount Lemmon Survey	·	1.8 km	MPC; JPL
645558	2007 TP_{279}	—	October 7, 2007	Mount Lemmon	Mount Lemmon Survey	EOS	1.4 km	MPC; JPL
645559	2007 TU_{281}	—	October 7, 2007	Gaisberg	Gierlinger, R.	·	1.4 km	MPC; JPL
645560	2007 TV_{285}	—	October 9, 2007	Mount Lemmon	Mount Lemmon Survey	KOR	1.0 km	MPC; JPL
645561	2007 TY_{285}	—	October 9, 2007	Mount Lemmon	Mount Lemmon Survey	·	2.2 km	MPC; JPL
645562	2007 TD_{288}	—	September 10, 2007	Kitt Peak	Spacewatch	NYS	970 m	MPC; JPL
645563	2007 TV_{290}	—	October 12, 2007	Mount Lemmon	Mount Lemmon Survey	·	2.4 km	MPC; JPL
645564	2007 TO_{294}	—	April 19, 2015	Mount Lemmon	Mount Lemmon Survey	·	1.4 km	MPC; JPL
645565	2007 TQ_{298}	—	September 11, 2007	Kitt Peak	Spacewatch	·	2.1 km	MPC; JPL
645566	2007 TP_{309}	—	October 10, 2007	Mount Lemmon	Mount Lemmon Survey	·	1.6 km	MPC; JPL
645567	2007 TV_{313}	—	October 11, 2007	Mount Lemmon	Mount Lemmon Survey	·	1.5 km	MPC; JPL
645568	2007 TP_{316}	—	January 16, 2005	Kitt Peak	Spacewatch	·	540 m	MPC; JPL
645569	2007 TQ_{316}	—	October 12, 2007	Kitt Peak	Spacewatch	·	1.4 km	MPC; JPL
645570	2007 TV_{323}	—	October 11, 2007	Kitt Peak	Spacewatch	·	1.8 km	MPC; JPL
645571	2007 TZ_{324}	—	October 11, 2007	Kitt Peak	Spacewatch	·	2.3 km	MPC; JPL
645572	2007 TJ_{328}	—	September 25, 2007	Mount Lemmon	Mount Lemmon Survey	·	2.5 km	MPC; JPL
645573	2007 TG_{329}	—	October 11, 2007	Kitt Peak	Spacewatch	·	1.4 km	MPC; JPL
645574	2007 TS_{329}	—	October 11, 2007	Kitt Peak	Spacewatch	·	2.7 km	MPC; JPL
645575	2007 TW_{335}	—	September 11, 2007	Catalina	CSS	·	1.4 km	MPC; JPL
645576	2007 TY_{337}	—	October 13, 2007	Catalina	CSS	·	1.5 km	MPC; JPL
645577	2007 TF_{341}	—	October 9, 2007	Mount Lemmon	Mount Lemmon Survey	·	1.8 km	MPC; JPL
645578	2007 TF_{346}	—	October 13, 2007	Mount Lemmon	Mount Lemmon Survey	·	1.0 km	MPC; JPL
645579	2007 TQ_{349}	—	August 22, 2007	Anderson Mesa	LONEOS	·	910 m	MPC; JPL
645580	2007 TU_{356}	—	September 10, 2007	Mount Lemmon	Mount Lemmon Survey	NYS	860 m	MPC; JPL
645581	2007 TJ_{359}	—	September 12, 2007	Kitt Peak	Spacewatch	L4	6.2 km	MPC; JPL
645582	2007 TG_{369}	—	October 11, 2007	Kitt Peak	Spacewatch	·	820 m	MPC; JPL
645583	2007 TB_{373}	—	October 14, 2007	Mount Lemmon	Mount Lemmon Survey	·	1.4 km	MPC; JPL
645584	2007 TR_{376}	—	October 10, 2007	Catalina	CSS	·	2.6 km	MPC; JPL
645585	2007 TX_{380}	—	September 22, 2003	Anderson Mesa	LONEOS	·	1.1 km	MPC; JPL
645586	2007 TS_{381}	—	October 14, 2007	Kitt Peak	Spacewatch	KOR	950 m	MPC; JPL
645587	2007 TV_{382}	—	October 14, 2007	Kitt Peak	Spacewatch	·	2.6 km	MPC; JPL
645588	2007 TH_{393}	—	October 13, 2007	Kitt Peak	Spacewatch	H	420 m	MPC; JPL
645589	2007 TY_{395}	—	October 15, 2007	Kitt Peak	Spacewatch	·	640 m	MPC; JPL
645590	2007 TZ_{395}	—	October 15, 2007	Kitt Peak	Spacewatch	·	2.1 km	MPC; JPL
645591	2007 TN_{400}	—	September 11, 2007	Mount Lemmon	Mount Lemmon Survey	·	2.5 km	MPC; JPL
645592	2007 TP_{401}	—	October 15, 2007	Mount Lemmon	Mount Lemmon Survey	·	1.6 km	MPC; JPL
645593	2007 TG_{403}	—	October 15, 2007	Mount Lemmon	Mount Lemmon Survey	EOS	1.6 km	MPC; JPL
645594	2007 TQ_{404}	—	September 13, 2007	Mount Lemmon	Mount Lemmon Survey	PHO	870 m	MPC; JPL
645595	2007 TO_{407}	—	October 15, 2007	Mount Lemmon	Mount Lemmon Survey	EOS	1.5 km	MPC; JPL
645596	2007 TQ_{407}	—	October 15, 2007	Mount Lemmon	Mount Lemmon Survey	·	1.8 km	MPC; JPL
645597	2007 TC_{416}	—	September 8, 2007	Mount Lemmon	Mount Lemmon Survey	·	590 m	MPC; JPL
645598	2007 TT_{423}	—	October 6, 2007	Kitt Peak	Spacewatch	·	1.8 km	MPC; JPL
645599	2007 TA_{438}	—	October 7, 2007	Mount Lemmon	Mount Lemmon Survey	·	1.2 km	MPC; JPL
645600	2007 TC_{439}	—	October 12, 2007	Kitt Peak	Spacewatch	THM	1.8 km	MPC; JPL

== 645601–645700 ==
back to top

Designation			Discovery			Properties		Ref
Permanent	Provisional	Named after	Date	Site	Discoverer(s)	Category	Diam.	Ref
645601	2007 TF_{439}	—	October 12, 2007	Kitt Peak	Spacewatch	·	2.0 km	MPC; JPL
645602	2007 TP_{439}	—	October 7, 2007	Mount Lemmon	Mount Lemmon Survey	EOS	1.5 km	MPC; JPL
645603	2007 TL_{442}	—	October 7, 2007	Kitt Peak	Spacewatch	·	600 m	MPC; JPL
645604	2007 TU_{442}	—	October 10, 2007	Kitt Peak	Spacewatch	·	2.3 km	MPC; JPL
645605	2007 TV_{443}	—	October 13, 2007	Kitt Peak	Spacewatch	·	980 m	MPC; JPL
645606	2007 TL_{444}	—	October 8, 2007	Mount Lemmon	Mount Lemmon Survey	·	1.0 km	MPC; JPL
645607	2007 TM_{444}	—	October 8, 2007	Catalina	CSS	·	730 m	MPC; JPL
645608	2007 TR_{445}	—	October 7, 2007	Mount Lemmon	Mount Lemmon Survey	·	2.0 km	MPC; JPL
645609	2007 TQ_{452}	—	October 12, 2007	Catalina	CSS	·	520 m	MPC; JPL
645610	2007 TP_{455}	—	October 9, 2007	Kitt Peak	Spacewatch	·	2.8 km	MPC; JPL
645611	2007 TD_{456}	—	October 9, 2007	Mount Lemmon	Mount Lemmon Survey	EOS	1.6 km	MPC; JPL
645612	2007 TN_{458}	—	October 12, 2007	Mount Lemmon	Mount Lemmon Survey	·	1.6 km	MPC; JPL
645613	2007 TV_{458}	—	October 14, 2007	Mount Lemmon	Mount Lemmon Survey	·	1.7 km	MPC; JPL
645614	2007 TX_{459}	—	October 15, 2012	Kitt Peak	Spacewatch	·	1.8 km	MPC; JPL
645615	2007 TA_{460}	—	February 2, 2009	Catalina	CSS	·	1.2 km	MPC; JPL
645616	2007 TN_{460}	—	October 11, 2007	Lulin	LUSS	T_{j} (2.97) · 3:2 · (6124)	5.4 km	MPC; JPL
645617	2007 TO_{460}	—	October 15, 2007	Mount Lemmon	Mount Lemmon Survey	·	2.2 km	MPC; JPL
645618	2007 TR_{460}	—	October 10, 2007	Kitt Peak	Spacewatch	·	1.3 km	MPC; JPL
645619	2007 TV_{460}	—	October 14, 2007	Kitt Peak	Spacewatch	·	1.4 km	MPC; JPL
645620	2007 TA_{461}	—	October 4, 2007	Kitt Peak	Spacewatch	·	2.4 km	MPC; JPL
645621	2007 TX_{461}	—	October 12, 2007	Mount Lemmon	Mount Lemmon Survey	·	2.8 km	MPC; JPL
645622	2007 TJ_{462}	—	October 10, 2007	Kitt Peak	Spacewatch	·	1.9 km	MPC; JPL
645623	2007 TK_{462}	—	October 9, 2007	Kitt Peak	Spacewatch	·	1.7 km	MPC; JPL
645624	2007 TM_{462}	—	June 17, 2010	Mount Lemmon	Mount Lemmon Survey	·	670 m	MPC; JPL
645625	2007 TP_{462}	—	March 6, 2013	Haleakala	Pan-STARRS 1	·	980 m	MPC; JPL
645626	2007 TX_{462}	—	October 8, 2007	Mount Lemmon	Mount Lemmon Survey	·	1.2 km	MPC; JPL
645627	2007 TO_{463}	—	October 9, 2007	Mount Lemmon	Mount Lemmon Survey	·	1.4 km	MPC; JPL
645628	2007 TV_{463}	—	October 11, 2007	Mount Lemmon	Mount Lemmon Survey	·	1.3 km	MPC; JPL
645629	2007 TB_{466}	—	October 15, 2007	Catalina	CSS	·	2.6 km	MPC; JPL
645630	2007 TC_{467}	—	October 15, 2007	Mount Lemmon	Mount Lemmon Survey	·	2.3 km	MPC; JPL
645631	2007 TE_{468}	—	August 13, 2012	Haleakala	Pan-STARRS 1	·	1.5 km	MPC; JPL
645632	2007 TL_{468}	—	October 9, 2007	Mount Lemmon	Mount Lemmon Survey	·	1.2 km	MPC; JPL
645633	2007 TW_{468}	—	October 10, 2007	Mount Lemmon	Mount Lemmon Survey	EOS	1.7 km	MPC; JPL
645634	2007 TY_{468}	—	August 24, 2012	Kitt Peak	Spacewatch	·	2.5 km	MPC; JPL
645635	2007 TE_{469}	—	October 12, 2007	Mount Lemmon	Mount Lemmon Survey	·	890 m	MPC; JPL
645636	2007 TP_{469}	—	June 4, 2011	Mount Lemmon	Mount Lemmon Survey	·	2.2 km	MPC; JPL
645637	2007 TV_{469}	—	December 30, 2013	Haleakala	Pan-STARRS 1	·	2.1 km	MPC; JPL
645638	2007 TX_{469}	—	November 28, 2013	Mount Lemmon	Mount Lemmon Survey	·	1.5 km	MPC; JPL
645639	2007 TG_{470}	—	October 10, 2007	Mount Lemmon	Mount Lemmon Survey	EOS	1.2 km	MPC; JPL
645640	2007 TN_{470}	—	October 8, 2007	Mount Lemmon	Mount Lemmon Survey	·	1.5 km	MPC; JPL
645641	2007 TO_{471}	—	October 11, 2007	Catalina	CSS	PHO	1.0 km	MPC; JPL
645642	2007 TL_{474}	—	October 9, 2007	Mount Lemmon	Mount Lemmon Survey	·	1.3 km	MPC; JPL
645643	2007 TO_{474}	—	October 4, 2007	Kitt Peak	Spacewatch	·	1.8 km	MPC; JPL
645644	2007 TZ_{474}	—	May 1, 2016	Cerro Tololo	DECam	·	1.2 km	MPC; JPL
645645	2007 TH_{475}	—	October 8, 2012	Mount Lemmon	Mount Lemmon Survey	·	1.5 km	MPC; JPL
645646	2007 TL_{475}	—	October 12, 2007	Mount Lemmon	Mount Lemmon Survey	·	2.0 km	MPC; JPL
645647	2007 TZ_{477}	—	June 25, 2017	Haleakala	Pan-STARRS 1	EOS	1.4 km	MPC; JPL
645648	2007 TH_{478}	—	October 11, 2015	Mount Lemmon	Mount Lemmon Survey	EUN	900 m	MPC; JPL
645649	2007 TS_{478}	—	January 1, 2014	Kitt Peak	Spacewatch	·	2.0 km	MPC; JPL
645650	2007 TC_{479}	—	October 9, 2007	Mount Lemmon	Mount Lemmon Survey	·	2.2 km	MPC; JPL
645651	2007 TW_{479}	—	October 9, 2007	Mount Lemmon	Mount Lemmon Survey	·	1.6 km	MPC; JPL
645652	2007 TB_{480}	—	October 9, 2007	Mount Lemmon	Mount Lemmon Survey	·	2.2 km	MPC; JPL
645653	2007 TZ_{480}	—	October 7, 2007	Mount Lemmon	Mount Lemmon Survey	KOR	1.1 km	MPC; JPL
645654	2007 TA_{481}	—	October 8, 2007	Mount Lemmon	Mount Lemmon Survey	·	1.6 km	MPC; JPL
645655	2007 TZ_{482}	—	October 14, 2007	Kitt Peak	Spacewatch	THM	1.6 km	MPC; JPL
645656	2007 TA_{484}	—	October 8, 2007	Mount Lemmon	Mount Lemmon Survey	·	1.0 km	MPC; JPL
645657	2007 TB_{486}	—	October 8, 2007	Mount Lemmon	Mount Lemmon Survey	·	1.4 km	MPC; JPL
645658	2007 TR_{487}	—	October 15, 2007	Mount Lemmon	Mount Lemmon Survey	·	1.9 km	MPC; JPL
645659	2007 TO_{490}	—	October 7, 2007	Catalina	CSS	·	660 m	MPC; JPL
645660	2007 TS_{491}	—	October 7, 2007	Kitt Peak	Spacewatch	EOS	1.6 km	MPC; JPL
645661	2007 TV_{493}	—	October 14, 2007	Mount Lemmon	Mount Lemmon Survey	·	1.4 km	MPC; JPL
645662	2007 TZ_{494}	—	October 14, 2007	Mount Lemmon	Mount Lemmon Survey	·	1.4 km	MPC; JPL
645663	2007 TJ_{495}	—	October 10, 2007	Mount Lemmon	Mount Lemmon Survey	·	860 m	MPC; JPL
645664	2007 TD_{496}	—	October 11, 2007	Kitt Peak	Spacewatch	·	1.6 km	MPC; JPL
645665	2007 TE_{496}	—	October 12, 2007	Mount Lemmon	Mount Lemmon Survey	·	2.4 km	MPC; JPL
645666	2007 TY_{508}	—	October 11, 2007	Mount Lemmon	Mount Lemmon Survey	·	1.6 km	MPC; JPL
645667	2007 TW_{509}	—	October 10, 2007	Mount Lemmon	Mount Lemmon Survey	·	1.5 km	MPC; JPL
645668	2007 US_{8}	—	July 17, 2001	Anderson Mesa	LONEOS	·	3.1 km	MPC; JPL
645669	2007 UB_{20}	—	September 13, 2007	Mount Lemmon	Mount Lemmon Survey	·	1.2 km	MPC; JPL
645670	2007 UY_{22}	—	October 8, 2007	Mount Lemmon	Mount Lemmon Survey	EOS	1.5 km	MPC; JPL
645671	2007 UY_{26}	—	October 16, 2007	Mount Lemmon	Mount Lemmon Survey	·	1.1 km	MPC; JPL
645672	2007 UF_{32}	—	October 19, 2007	Mount Lemmon	Mount Lemmon Survey	H	430 m	MPC; JPL
645673	2007 US_{41}	—	October 16, 2007	Mount Lemmon	Mount Lemmon Survey	·	1.8 km	MPC; JPL
645674	2007 UA_{45}	—	September 11, 2007	Mount Lemmon	Mount Lemmon Survey	·	1.5 km	MPC; JPL
645675	2007 UF_{52}	—	March 19, 2001	Apache Point	SDSS Collaboration	EUN	1.7 km	MPC; JPL
645676	2007 UC_{53}	—	October 16, 2007	Kitt Peak	Spacewatch	·	1.9 km	MPC; JPL
645677	2007 UU_{53}	—	October 15, 2007	Bergisch Gladbach	W. Bickel	·	1.2 km	MPC; JPL
645678	2007 UN_{58}	—	October 12, 2007	Kitt Peak	Spacewatch	·	1 km	MPC; JPL
645679	2007 UV_{61}	—	October 5, 2007	Kitt Peak	Spacewatch	·	1.1 km	MPC; JPL
645680	2007 UC_{63}	—	October 16, 2007	Kitt Peak	Spacewatch	EOS	1.4 km	MPC; JPL
645681	2007 UX_{64}	—	October 30, 2007	Mount Lemmon	Mount Lemmon Survey	·	1.3 km	MPC; JPL
645682	2007 UP_{68}	—	October 30, 2007	Mount Lemmon	Mount Lemmon Survey	EOS	1.4 km	MPC; JPL
645683	2007 UR_{72}	—	October 31, 2007	Mount Lemmon	Mount Lemmon Survey	KOR	970 m	MPC; JPL
645684	2007 UA_{73}	—	October 31, 2007	Mount Lemmon	Mount Lemmon Survey	·	1.4 km	MPC; JPL
645685	2007 UR_{75}	—	October 31, 2007	Mount Lemmon	Mount Lemmon Survey	·	1.4 km	MPC; JPL
645686	2007 UP_{79}	—	October 30, 2007	Mount Lemmon	Mount Lemmon Survey	KOR	1.0 km	MPC; JPL
645687	2007 UM_{84}	—	September 18, 2007	Mount Lemmon	Mount Lemmon Survey	·	1.4 km	MPC; JPL
645688	2007 UV_{84}	—	October 11, 2007	Kitt Peak	Spacewatch	·	2.4 km	MPC; JPL
645689	2007 UN_{87}	—	October 30, 2007	Kitt Peak	Spacewatch	MAS	540 m	MPC; JPL
645690	2007 UO_{88}	—	October 30, 2007	Mount Lemmon	Mount Lemmon Survey	·	2.0 km	MPC; JPL
645691	2007 UD_{95}	—	October 11, 2007	Kitt Peak	Spacewatch	·	1.3 km	MPC; JPL
645692	2007 UJ_{97}	—	October 8, 2007	Mount Lemmon	Mount Lemmon Survey	·	2.5 km	MPC; JPL
645693	2007 UB_{100}	—	November 1, 1999	Kitt Peak	Spacewatch	·	1.2 km	MPC; JPL
645694	2007 UU_{102}	—	October 30, 2007	Mount Lemmon	Mount Lemmon Survey	·	1.8 km	MPC; JPL
645695	2007 UW_{106}	—	October 11, 2007	Kitt Peak	Spacewatch	·	1.3 km	MPC; JPL
645696	2007 UF_{111}	—	October 30, 2007	Mount Lemmon	Mount Lemmon Survey	EOS	1.5 km	MPC; JPL
645697	2007 UE_{112}	—	October 30, 2007	Mount Lemmon	Mount Lemmon Survey	EOS	1.3 km	MPC; JPL
645698	2007 UQ_{116}	—	October 30, 2007	Kitt Peak	Spacewatch	·	1.6 km	MPC; JPL
645699	2007 UY_{122}	—	October 31, 2007	Kitt Peak	Spacewatch	·	1.7 km	MPC; JPL
645700	2007 UE_{126}	—	August 10, 2007	Charleston	R. Holmes	·	1.7 km	MPC; JPL

== 645701–645800 ==
back to top

Designation			Discovery			Properties		Ref
Permanent	Provisional	Named after	Date	Site	Discoverer(s)	Category	Diam.	Ref
645701	2007 UN_{127}	—	October 31, 2007	Mount Lemmon	Mount Lemmon Survey	·	1.6 km	MPC; JPL
645702	2007 UU_{136}	—	October 20, 2003	Palomar	NEAT	·	1.3 km	MPC; JPL
645703	2007 UZ_{136}	—	October 30, 2007	Kitt Peak	Spacewatch	NYS	1.0 km	MPC; JPL
645704	2007 UG_{137}	—	October 19, 2007	Catalina	CSS	·	1.2 km	MPC; JPL
645705	2007 UN_{137}	—	October 16, 2007	Mount Lemmon	Mount Lemmon Survey	H	510 m	MPC; JPL
645706	2007 UE_{145}	—	October 21, 2007	Mount Lemmon	Mount Lemmon Survey	·	1.5 km	MPC; JPL
645707	2007 UE_{146}	—	October 21, 2007	Mount Lemmon	Mount Lemmon Survey	EOS	1.6 km	MPC; JPL
645708	2007 UF_{146}	—	October 18, 2007	Kitt Peak	Spacewatch	·	1.9 km	MPC; JPL
645709	2007 UJ_{146}	—	September 30, 2011	Mount Lemmon	Mount Lemmon Survey	·	1.0 km	MPC; JPL
645710	2007 UO_{146}	—	August 26, 2012	Haleakala	Pan-STARRS 1	EOS	1.5 km	MPC; JPL
645711	2007 UD_{147}	—	October 20, 2007	Mount Lemmon	Mount Lemmon Survey	·	2.4 km	MPC; JPL
645712	2007 UC_{148}	—	July 11, 2007	Lulin	LUSS	·	1.2 km	MPC; JPL
645713	2007 UU_{148}	—	June 22, 2015	Haleakala	Pan-STARRS 1	·	1.1 km	MPC; JPL
645714	2007 UV_{148}	—	October 20, 2007	Mount Lemmon	Mount Lemmon Survey	·	1.2 km	MPC; JPL
645715	2007 UG_{149}	—	August 14, 2012	Kitt Peak	Spacewatch	·	1.9 km	MPC; JPL
645716	2007 UH_{149}	—	January 2, 2009	Kitt Peak	Spacewatch	·	1.3 km	MPC; JPL
645717	2007 UT_{149}	—	April 3, 2017	Haleakala	Pan-STARRS 1	·	900 m	MPC; JPL
645718	2007 UX_{149}	—	March 5, 2013	Mount Lemmon	Mount Lemmon Survey	·	720 m	MPC; JPL
645719	2007 UH_{150}	—	September 23, 2001	Palomar	NEAT	·	2.7 km	MPC; JPL
645720	2007 UO_{150}	—	September 24, 2012	Kitt Peak	Spacewatch	·	1.4 km	MPC; JPL
645721	2007 UW_{150}	—	April 14, 2016	Haleakala	Pan-STARRS 1	EOS	2.0 km	MPC; JPL
645722	2007 UX_{150}	—	January 1, 2009	Mount Lemmon	Mount Lemmon Survey	·	2.6 km	MPC; JPL
645723	2007 UR_{152}	—	October 16, 2012	Mount Lemmon	Mount Lemmon Survey	KOR	960 m	MPC; JPL
645724	2007 US_{152}	—	September 30, 2017	Mount Lemmon	Mount Lemmon Survey	·	2.4 km	MPC; JPL
645725	2007 UU_{152}	—	July 9, 2016	Haleakala	Pan-STARRS 1	·	1.4 km	MPC; JPL
645726	2007 UZ_{152}	—	October 5, 2007	Charleston	R. Holmes	·	1.9 km	MPC; JPL
645727	2007 UZ_{153}	—	January 20, 2009	Mount Lemmon	Mount Lemmon Survey	·	2.2 km	MPC; JPL
645728	2007 UF_{154}	—	October 26, 2011	Haleakala	Pan-STARRS 1	·	870 m	MPC; JPL
645729	2007 UK_{159}	—	October 18, 2007	Kitt Peak	Spacewatch	EOS	1.4 km	MPC; JPL
645730	2007 UZ_{160}	—	October 16, 2007	Mount Lemmon	Mount Lemmon Survey	·	1.8 km	MPC; JPL
645731	2007 UA_{162}	—	October 31, 2007	Mount Lemmon	Mount Lemmon Survey	·	1.8 km	MPC; JPL
645732	2007 UD_{165}	—	October 20, 2007	Mount Lemmon	Mount Lemmon Survey	·	1.8 km	MPC; JPL
645733	2007 VR_{3}	—	October 8, 2007	Catalina	CSS	·	1.9 km	MPC; JPL
645734	2007 VW_{3}	—	October 8, 2007	Catalina	CSS	EOS	2.1 km	MPC; JPL
645735	2007 VQ_{10}	—	September 25, 2007	Mount Lemmon	Mount Lemmon Survey	·	2.1 km	MPC; JPL
645736	2007 VX_{13}	—	November 1, 2007	Mount Lemmon	Mount Lemmon Survey	·	1.2 km	MPC; JPL
645737	2007 VY_{17}	—	November 1, 2007	Mount Lemmon	Mount Lemmon Survey	KOR	1.0 km	MPC; JPL
645738	2007 VE_{19}	—	October 10, 2007	Kitt Peak	Spacewatch	·	470 m	MPC; JPL
645739	2007 VV_{23}	—	November 2, 2007	Mount Lemmon	Mount Lemmon Survey	·	2.0 km	MPC; JPL
645740	2007 VN_{25}	—	November 1, 2007	Kitt Peak	Spacewatch	·	1.8 km	MPC; JPL
645741	2007 VV_{25}	—	October 5, 2007	Kitt Peak	Spacewatch	NYS	900 m	MPC; JPL
645742	2007 VJ_{33}	—	November 2, 2007	Kitt Peak	Spacewatch	EOS	1.6 km	MPC; JPL
645743	2007 VA_{35}	—	November 3, 2007	Kitt Peak	Spacewatch	·	1.7 km	MPC; JPL
645744	2007 VQ_{35}	—	October 20, 2007	Kitt Peak	Spacewatch	·	1.5 km	MPC; JPL
645745	2007 VD_{40}	—	November 3, 2007	Mount Lemmon	Mount Lemmon Survey	·	1.9 km	MPC; JPL
645746	2007 VE_{42}	—	November 3, 2007	Mount Lemmon	Mount Lemmon Survey	·	1.1 km	MPC; JPL
645747	2007 VX_{42}	—	November 3, 2007	Kitt Peak	Spacewatch	·	510 m	MPC; JPL
645748	2007 VE_{50}	—	November 1, 2007	Kitt Peak	Spacewatch	·	2.2 km	MPC; JPL
645749	2007 VV_{52}	—	October 20, 2007	Mount Lemmon	Mount Lemmon Survey	EOS	1.6 km	MPC; JPL
645750	2007 VK_{54}	—	October 20, 2007	Mount Lemmon	Mount Lemmon Survey	·	890 m	MPC; JPL
645751	2007 VX_{58}	—	October 21, 2007	Mount Lemmon	Mount Lemmon Survey	·	2.4 km	MPC; JPL
645752	2007 VT_{59}	—	November 1, 2007	Kitt Peak	Spacewatch	·	1.7 km	MPC; JPL
645753	2007 VT_{64}	—	November 1, 2007	Kitt Peak	Spacewatch	EUN	1.0 km	MPC; JPL
645754	2007 VP_{66}	—	November 2, 2007	Kitt Peak	Spacewatch	·	1.9 km	MPC; JPL
645755	2007 VV_{68}	—	April 7, 2006	Kitt Peak	Spacewatch	·	640 m	MPC; JPL
645756	2007 VS_{69}	—	October 8, 2007	Mount Lemmon	Mount Lemmon Survey	·	1.8 km	MPC; JPL
645757	2007 VY_{72}	—	September 15, 2007	Mount Lemmon	Mount Lemmon Survey	·	1.5 km	MPC; JPL
645758	2007 VA_{76}	—	October 10, 2007	Mount Lemmon	Mount Lemmon Survey	·	1.6 km	MPC; JPL
645759	2007 VT_{77}	—	October 12, 2007	Kitt Peak	Spacewatch	·	1.4 km	MPC; JPL
645760	2007 VW_{77}	—	November 3, 2007	Kitt Peak	Spacewatch	·	1.5 km	MPC; JPL
645761	2007 VO_{81}	—	November 4, 2007	Kitt Peak	Spacewatch	·	1.5 km	MPC; JPL
645762	2007 VW_{81}	—	November 4, 2007	Kitt Peak	Spacewatch	KOR	1.2 km	MPC; JPL
645763	2007 VN_{88}	—	November 8, 2007	Kitt Peak	Spacewatch	H	550 m	MPC; JPL
645764	2007 VN_{104}	—	November 3, 2007	Kitt Peak	Spacewatch	THM	1.5 km	MPC; JPL
645765	2007 VA_{110}	—	October 30, 2007	Kitt Peak	Spacewatch	EOS	1.5 km	MPC; JPL
645766	2007 VP_{110}	—	November 3, 2007	Kitt Peak	Spacewatch	·	890 m	MPC; JPL
645767	2007 VC_{111}	—	November 3, 2007	Kitt Peak	Spacewatch	·	1.8 km	MPC; JPL
645768	2007 VM_{111}	—	November 3, 2007	Kitt Peak	Spacewatch	·	1 km	MPC; JPL
645769	2007 VZ_{111}	—	November 3, 2007	Kitt Peak	Spacewatch	EOS	1.7 km	MPC; JPL
645770	2007 VP_{115}	—	November 3, 2007	Kitt Peak	Spacewatch	·	2.3 km	MPC; JPL
645771	2007 VO_{123}	—	November 5, 2007	Mount Lemmon	Mount Lemmon Survey	H	540 m	MPC; JPL
645772	2007 VR_{124}	—	November 5, 2007	Mount Lemmon	Mount Lemmon Survey	AEG	2.5 km	MPC; JPL
645773	2007 VO_{127}	—	September 15, 2007	Kitt Peak	Spacewatch	3:2	3.8 km	MPC; JPL
645774	2007 VM_{130}	—	November 1, 2007	Mount Lemmon	Mount Lemmon Survey	·	1.1 km	MPC; JPL
645775	2007 VW_{130}	—	November 1, 2007	Mount Lemmon	Mount Lemmon Survey	·	1.6 km	MPC; JPL
645776	2007 VL_{132}	—	October 21, 2007	Kitt Peak	Spacewatch	·	2.1 km	MPC; JPL
645777	2007 VX_{132}	—	November 2, 2007	Mount Lemmon	Mount Lemmon Survey	·	1.6 km	MPC; JPL
645778	2007 VC_{133}	—	October 10, 2007	Kitt Peak	Spacewatch	3:2	4.1 km	MPC; JPL
645779	2007 VE_{133}	—	October 8, 2007	Mount Lemmon	Mount Lemmon Survey	·	1.9 km	MPC; JPL
645780	2007 VK_{133}	—	November 2, 2007	Mount Lemmon	Mount Lemmon Survey	·	1.4 km	MPC; JPL
645781	2007 VK_{138}	—	October 11, 2007	Kitt Peak	Spacewatch	EOS	1.4 km	MPC; JPL
645782	2007 VA_{146}	—	November 4, 2007	Kitt Peak	Spacewatch	·	1.3 km	MPC; JPL
645783	2007 VD_{151}	—	November 7, 2007	Mount Lemmon	Mount Lemmon Survey	EOS	1.4 km	MPC; JPL
645784	2007 VT_{156}	—	October 18, 2007	Mount Lemmon	Mount Lemmon Survey	·	1.3 km	MPC; JPL
645785	2007 VE_{158}	—	September 15, 2007	Mount Lemmon	Mount Lemmon Survey	EUP	2.7 km	MPC; JPL
645786	2007 VG_{158}	—	October 20, 2007	Mount Lemmon	Mount Lemmon Survey	·	1.2 km	MPC; JPL
645787	2007 VE_{159}	—	November 5, 2007	Kitt Peak	Spacewatch	·	1.6 km	MPC; JPL
645788	2007 VP_{163}	—	November 5, 2007	Kitt Peak	Spacewatch	·	1.0 km	MPC; JPL
645789	2007 VH_{171}	—	November 7, 2007	Kitt Peak	Spacewatch	·	2.5 km	MPC; JPL
645790	2007 VX_{172}	—	November 2, 2007	Mount Lemmon	Mount Lemmon Survey	KOR	990 m	MPC; JPL
645791	2007 VC_{178}	—	October 10, 2007	Kitt Peak	Spacewatch	·	1.1 km	MPC; JPL
645792	2007 VG_{179}	—	October 9, 2007	Kitt Peak	Spacewatch	EOS	1.8 km	MPC; JPL
645793	2007 VT_{182}	—	October 12, 2007	Mount Lemmon	Mount Lemmon Survey	·	2.1 km	MPC; JPL
645794	2007 VG_{188}	—	November 12, 2007	Goodricke-Pigott	R. A. Tucker	·	1.9 km	MPC; JPL
645795	2007 VK_{188}	—	September 10, 2007	Mount Lemmon	Mount Lemmon Survey	·	2.3 km	MPC; JPL
645796	2007 VT_{189}	—	October 21, 2007	Kitt Peak	Spacewatch	H	370 m	MPC; JPL
645797	2007 VF_{190}	—	September 14, 2007	Mount Lemmon	Mount Lemmon Survey	·	1.7 km	MPC; JPL
645798	2007 VX_{190}	—	November 15, 2007	Mount Lemmon	Mount Lemmon Survey	H	480 m	MPC; JPL
645799	2007 VV_{194}	—	November 5, 2007	Mount Lemmon	Mount Lemmon Survey	LIX	3.0 km	MPC; JPL
645800	2007 VR_{206}	—	May 20, 2006	Kitt Peak	Spacewatch	PHO	910 m	MPC; JPL

== 645801–645900 ==
back to top

Designation			Discovery			Properties		Ref
Permanent	Provisional	Named after	Date	Site	Discoverer(s)	Category	Diam.	Ref
645801	2007 VK_{207}	—	October 31, 2007	Catalina	CSS	·	1.7 km	MPC; JPL
645802	2007 VA_{210}	—	November 9, 2007	Kitt Peak	Spacewatch	V	540 m	MPC; JPL
645803	2007 VU_{210}	—	November 9, 2007	Kitt Peak	Spacewatch	EOS	1.3 km	MPC; JPL
645804	2007 VL_{211}	—	November 9, 2007	Kitt Peak	Spacewatch	·	800 m	MPC; JPL
645805	2007 VL_{212}	—	November 1, 2007	Kitt Peak	Spacewatch	V	780 m	MPC; JPL
645806	2007 VR_{213}	—	November 1, 2007	Kitt Peak	Spacewatch	·	710 m	MPC; JPL
645807	2007 VT_{217}	—	November 5, 2007	Kitt Peak	Spacewatch	·	1.3 km	MPC; JPL
645808	2007 VT_{219}	—	November 9, 2007	Kitt Peak	Spacewatch	·	900 m	MPC; JPL
645809	2007 VF_{220}	—	November 9, 2007	Kitt Peak	Spacewatch	·	910 m	MPC; JPL
645810	2007 VT_{220}	—	November 9, 2007	Kitt Peak	Spacewatch	·	1.9 km	MPC; JPL
645811	2007 VG_{221}	—	September 10, 2007	Mount Lemmon	Mount Lemmon Survey	·	1.9 km	MPC; JPL
645812	2007 VD_{224}	—	November 7, 2007	Kitt Peak	Spacewatch	·	2.2 km	MPC; JPL
645813	2007 VS_{228}	—	November 7, 2007	Kitt Peak	Spacewatch	·	2.3 km	MPC; JPL
645814	2007 VV_{228}	—	November 7, 2007	Kitt Peak	Spacewatch	·	1.5 km	MPC; JPL
645815	2007 VX_{228}	—	November 7, 2007	Kitt Peak	Spacewatch	·	1.6 km	MPC; JPL
645816	2007 VW_{230}	—	October 17, 2007	Mount Lemmon	Mount Lemmon Survey	EOS	1.4 km	MPC; JPL
645817	2007 VQ_{231}	—	October 16, 2007	Mount Lemmon	Mount Lemmon Survey	·	1.8 km	MPC; JPL
645818	2007 VS_{231}	—	November 7, 2007	Kitt Peak	Spacewatch	NYS	880 m	MPC; JPL
645819	2007 VX_{232}	—	November 7, 2007	Kitt Peak	Spacewatch	·	1.4 km	MPC; JPL
645820	2007 VH_{239}	—	November 5, 2007	Kitt Peak	Spacewatch	·	2.3 km	MPC; JPL
645821	2007 VX_{239}	—	November 13, 2007	Kitt Peak	Spacewatch	·	2.1 km	MPC; JPL
645822	2007 VZ_{242}	—	November 2, 2007	Mount Lemmon	Mount Lemmon Survey	KOR	1.1 km	MPC; JPL
645823	2007 VN_{248}	—	November 5, 2007	Mount Lemmon	Mount Lemmon Survey	EOS	1.6 km	MPC; JPL
645824	2007 VA_{249}	—	November 14, 2007	Mount Lemmon	Mount Lemmon Survey	EOS	1.4 km	MPC; JPL
645825	2007 VG_{249}	—	November 14, 2007	Mount Lemmon	Mount Lemmon Survey	·	1.8 km	MPC; JPL
645826	2007 VO_{249}	—	November 14, 2007	Mount Lemmon	Mount Lemmon Survey	EOS	1.5 km	MPC; JPL
645827	2007 VQ_{249}	—	November 14, 2007	Mount Lemmon	Mount Lemmon Survey	EOS	1.3 km	MPC; JPL
645828	2007 VB_{250}	—	November 14, 2007	Mount Lemmon	Mount Lemmon Survey	·	2.0 km	MPC; JPL
645829	2007 VT_{254}	—	November 15, 2007	Mount Lemmon	Mount Lemmon Survey	EOS	1.6 km	MPC; JPL
645830	2007 VV_{254}	—	October 12, 2007	Mount Lemmon	Mount Lemmon Survey	·	2.0 km	MPC; JPL
645831	2007 VN_{255}	—	November 12, 2007	Mount Lemmon	Mount Lemmon Survey	·	1.6 km	MPC; JPL
645832	2007 VV_{255}	—	November 5, 2007	Kitt Peak	Spacewatch	·	2.0 km	MPC; JPL
645833	2007 VB_{256}	—	November 5, 2007	Kitt Peak	Spacewatch	·	1.1 km	MPC; JPL
645834	2007 VR_{256}	—	October 12, 2007	Mount Lemmon	Mount Lemmon Survey	·	2.3 km	MPC; JPL
645835	2007 VX_{256}	—	November 13, 2007	Mount Lemmon	Mount Lemmon Survey	·	1.8 km	MPC; JPL
645836	2007 VD_{258}	—	November 15, 2007	Mount Lemmon	Mount Lemmon Survey	·	1.6 km	MPC; JPL
645837	2007 VH_{258}	—	November 15, 2007	Mount Lemmon	Mount Lemmon Survey	·	1.6 km	MPC; JPL
645838	2007 VJ_{259}	—	November 15, 2007	Mount Lemmon	Mount Lemmon Survey	·	1.1 km	MPC; JPL
645839	2007 VR_{259}	—	November 15, 2007	Mount Lemmon	Mount Lemmon Survey	(16286)	1.8 km	MPC; JPL
645840	2007 VN_{264}	—	November 5, 2007	Kitt Peak	Spacewatch	·	680 m	MPC; JPL
645841	2007 VC_{268}	—	November 7, 2007	Catalina	CSS	·	1.7 km	MPC; JPL
645842	2007 VM_{268}	—	November 8, 2007	Mount Lemmon	Mount Lemmon Survey	·	2.7 km	MPC; JPL
645843	2007 VN_{274}	—	November 5, 2007	Kitt Peak	Spacewatch	EOS	1.7 km	MPC; JPL
645844	2007 VY_{275}	—	November 7, 2007	Kitt Peak	Spacewatch	EOS	1.7 km	MPC; JPL
645845	2007 VY_{278}	—	November 14, 2007	Kitt Peak	Spacewatch	·	2.2 km	MPC; JPL
645846	2007 VL_{279}	—	October 30, 2007	Kitt Peak	Spacewatch	·	740 m	MPC; JPL
645847	2007 VO_{281}	—	November 14, 2007	Kitt Peak	Spacewatch	·	1.7 km	MPC; JPL
645848	2007 VP_{282}	—	October 16, 2007	Mount Lemmon	Mount Lemmon Survey	·	820 m	MPC; JPL
645849	2007 VU_{283}	—	October 20, 2007	Mount Lemmon	Mount Lemmon Survey	EOS	1.5 km	MPC; JPL
645850	2007 VD_{285}	—	November 5, 2007	Kitt Peak	Spacewatch	·	1.8 km	MPC; JPL
645851	2007 VJ_{285}	—	November 14, 2007	Kitt Peak	Spacewatch	PHO	730 m	MPC; JPL
645852	2007 VV_{285}	—	November 5, 2007	Kitt Peak	Spacewatch	·	1.4 km	MPC; JPL
645853	2007 VB_{294}	—	November 1, 2007	Kitt Peak	Spacewatch	3:2	4.8 km	MPC; JPL
645854	2007 VO_{294}	—	November 13, 2007	Kitt Peak	Spacewatch	·	2.5 km	MPC; JPL
645855	2007 VV_{296}	—	August 30, 2017	Mount Lemmon	Mount Lemmon Survey	·	2.3 km	MPC; JPL
645856	2007 VJ_{299}	—	October 10, 2007	Kitt Peak	Spacewatch	·	2.1 km	MPC; JPL
645857	2007 VL_{314}	—	November 2, 2007	Mount Lemmon	Mount Lemmon Survey	·	2.3 km	MPC; JPL
645858	2007 VR_{318}	—	November 9, 2007	Kitt Peak	Spacewatch	KOR	970 m	MPC; JPL
645859	2007 VP_{322}	—	November 1, 2007	Kitt Peak	Spacewatch	·	2.4 km	MPC; JPL
645860	2007 VD_{324}	—	November 7, 2007	Kitt Peak	Spacewatch	·	2.7 km	MPC; JPL
645861	2007 VL_{331}	—	November 6, 2007	Kitt Peak	Spacewatch	EOS	1.4 km	MPC; JPL
645862	2007 VF_{333}	—	November 9, 2007	Kitt Peak	Spacewatch	EOS	1.4 km	MPC; JPL
645863	2007 VU_{338}	—	November 3, 2007	Kitt Peak	Spacewatch	·	2.0 km	MPC; JPL
645864	2007 VH_{340}	—	November 2, 2007	Mount Lemmon	Mount Lemmon Survey	·	1.8 km	MPC; JPL
645865	2007 VA_{341}	—	November 7, 2007	Mount Lemmon	Mount Lemmon Survey	·	2.0 km	MPC; JPL
645866	2007 VV_{341}	—	November 11, 2007	Mount Lemmon	Mount Lemmon Survey	(5)	1.1 km	MPC; JPL
645867	2007 VG_{342}	—	September 14, 2006	Kitt Peak	Spacewatch	·	2.0 km	MPC; JPL
645868	2007 VL_{342}	—	November 5, 2007	Kitt Peak	Spacewatch	EOS	1.6 km	MPC; JPL
645869	2007 VO_{342}	—	November 7, 2007	Catalina	CSS	·	3.1 km	MPC; JPL
645870	2007 VA_{343}	—	January 28, 2014	Kitt Peak	Spacewatch	·	1.7 km	MPC; JPL
645871	2007 VJ_{343}	—	August 21, 2011	Haleakala	Pan-STARRS 1	·	1.6 km	MPC; JPL
645872	2007 VS_{343}	—	October 20, 2012	Mount Lemmon	Mount Lemmon Survey	·	1.9 km	MPC; JPL
645873	2007 VZ_{343}	—	October 19, 2011	Kitt Peak	Spacewatch	V	510 m	MPC; JPL
645874	2007 VB_{344}	—	October 16, 2012	Kitt Peak	Spacewatch	·	1.5 km	MPC; JPL
645875	2007 VZ_{344}	—	October 9, 2007	Kitt Peak	Spacewatch	·	1.6 km	MPC; JPL
645876	2007 VJ_{345}	—	November 12, 2007	Mount Lemmon	Mount Lemmon Survey	·	1.5 km	MPC; JPL
645877	2007 VK_{345}	—	March 8, 2013	Haleakala	Pan-STARRS 1	·	1.1 km	MPC; JPL
645878	2007 VP_{348}	—	November 9, 2007	Mount Lemmon	Mount Lemmon Survey	·	2.7 km	MPC; JPL
645879	2007 VT_{348}	—	October 9, 2010	Mount Lemmon	Mount Lemmon Survey	·	530 m	MPC; JPL
645880	2007 VV_{348}	—	February 20, 2009	Mount Lemmon	Mount Lemmon Survey	·	1.2 km	MPC; JPL
645881	2007 VA_{349}	—	November 3, 2007	Mount Lemmon	Mount Lemmon Survey	·	1.8 km	MPC; JPL
645882	2007 VV_{349}	—	September 30, 2011	Kitt Peak	Spacewatch	·	860 m	MPC; JPL
645883	2007 VE_{350}	—	September 24, 2017	Haleakala	Pan-STARRS 1	·	1.4 km	MPC; JPL
645884	2007 VH_{350}	—	November 5, 2007	Kitt Peak	Spacewatch	EOS	1.9 km	MPC; JPL
645885	2007 VO_{350}	—	November 2, 2007	Kitt Peak	Spacewatch	EOS	1.5 km	MPC; JPL
645886	2007 VU_{350}	—	November 5, 2007	Kitt Peak	Spacewatch	·	1.4 km	MPC; JPL
645887	2007 VV_{350}	—	October 19, 2012	Mount Lemmon	Mount Lemmon Survey	EOS	1.5 km	MPC; JPL
645888	2007 VY_{350}	—	November 13, 2007	Kitt Peak	Spacewatch	HYG	2.4 km	MPC; JPL
645889	2007 VO_{351}	—	August 27, 2001	Bergisch Gladbach	W. Bickel	·	2.2 km	MPC; JPL
645890	2007 VT_{351}	—	November 1, 2007	Kitt Peak	Spacewatch	·	2.0 km	MPC; JPL
645891	2007 VU_{352}	—	November 14, 2007	Kitt Peak	Spacewatch	·	2.1 km	MPC; JPL
645892	2007 VG_{353}	—	May 5, 2016	Haleakala	Pan-STARRS 1	EOS	1.5 km	MPC; JPL
645893	2007 VJ_{355}	—	November 13, 2007	Mount Lemmon	Mount Lemmon Survey	EOS	1.5 km	MPC; JPL
645894	2007 VV_{356}	—	October 17, 2012	Haleakala	Pan-STARRS 1	EOS	1.6 km	MPC; JPL
645895	2007 VY_{356}	—	November 2, 2007	Kitt Peak	Spacewatch	·	510 m	MPC; JPL
645896	2007 VE_{358}	—	April 9, 2015	Mount Lemmon	Mount Lemmon Survey	·	1.5 km	MPC; JPL
645897	2007 VJ_{359}	—	November 9, 2007	Kitt Peak	Spacewatch	·	1.1 km	MPC; JPL
645898	2007 VS_{360}	—	November 7, 2007	Kitt Peak	Spacewatch	·	980 m	MPC; JPL
645899	2007 VT_{360}	—	November 7, 2007	Kitt Peak	Spacewatch	·	1.0 km	MPC; JPL
645900	2007 VY_{360}	—	June 21, 2014	Mount Lemmon	Mount Lemmon Survey	·	1.1 km	MPC; JPL

== 645901–646000 ==
back to top

Designation			Discovery			Properties		Ref
Permanent	Provisional	Named after	Date	Site	Discoverer(s)	Category	Diam.	Ref
645901	2007 VM_{361}	—	November 4, 2007	Kitt Peak	Spacewatch	·	2.4 km	MPC; JPL
645902	2007 VQ_{361}	—	January 25, 2015	Haleakala	Pan-STARRS 1	EOS	1.5 km	MPC; JPL
645903	2007 VW_{361}	—	August 18, 2017	Haleakala	Pan-STARRS 1	EOS	1.6 km	MPC; JPL
645904	2007 VW_{362}	—	November 2, 2007	Mount Lemmon	Mount Lemmon Survey	·	2.4 km	MPC; JPL
645905	2007 VX_{362}	—	November 12, 2007	Mount Lemmon	Mount Lemmon Survey	·	2.4 km	MPC; JPL
645906	2007 VD_{363}	—	September 12, 2001	Kitt Peak	Spacewatch	·	1.8 km	MPC; JPL
645907	2007 VF_{364}	—	November 15, 2007	Mount Lemmon	Mount Lemmon Survey	·	460 m	MPC; JPL
645908	2007 VK_{364}	—	November 13, 2007	Mount Lemmon	Mount Lemmon Survey	·	2.8 km	MPC; JPL
645909	2007 VB_{365}	—	November 7, 2007	Kitt Peak	Spacewatch	·	2.7 km	MPC; JPL
645910	2007 VG_{365}	—	November 2, 2007	Mount Lemmon	Mount Lemmon Survey	EOS	1.5 km	MPC; JPL
645911	2007 VJ_{365}	—	November 12, 2007	Mount Lemmon	Mount Lemmon Survey	·	1.8 km	MPC; JPL
645912	2007 VN_{365}	—	November 3, 2007	Kitt Peak	Spacewatch	·	1.8 km	MPC; JPL
645913	2007 VS_{365}	—	November 3, 2007	Kitt Peak	Spacewatch	·	2.7 km	MPC; JPL
645914	2007 VT_{365}	—	November 3, 2007	Kitt Peak	Spacewatch	·	1.1 km	MPC; JPL
645915	2007 VV_{365}	—	November 6, 2007	Kitt Peak	Spacewatch	·	2.6 km	MPC; JPL
645916	2007 VX_{365}	—	November 5, 2007	Mount Lemmon	Mount Lemmon Survey	LIX	3.1 km	MPC; JPL
645917	2007 VK_{367}	—	November 7, 2007	Kitt Peak	Spacewatch	·	1.5 km	MPC; JPL
645918	2007 VN_{367}	—	November 14, 2007	Kitt Peak	Spacewatch	·	1.5 km	MPC; JPL
645919	2007 VS_{369}	—	November 8, 2007	Kitt Peak	Spacewatch	·	1.0 km	MPC; JPL
645920	2007 VB_{374}	—	November 2, 2007	Mount Lemmon	Mount Lemmon Survey	VER	2.1 km	MPC; JPL
645921	2007 VL_{374}	—	November 2, 2007	Mount Lemmon	Mount Lemmon Survey	·	2.1 km	MPC; JPL
645922	2007 VM_{374}	—	November 14, 2007	Kitt Peak	Spacewatch	EOS	1.6 km	MPC; JPL
645923	2007 VZ_{374}	—	November 3, 2007	Kitt Peak	Spacewatch	EOS	1.4 km	MPC; JPL
645924	2007 VB_{375}	—	November 2, 2007	Mount Lemmon	Mount Lemmon Survey	EOS	1.6 km	MPC; JPL
645925	2007 VK_{375}	—	November 11, 2007	Mount Lemmon	Mount Lemmon Survey	·	2.5 km	MPC; JPL
645926	2007 VL_{375}	—	November 7, 2007	Kitt Peak	Spacewatch	EOS	1.3 km	MPC; JPL
645927	2007 VM_{375}	—	November 8, 2007	Mount Lemmon	Mount Lemmon Survey	·	1.3 km	MPC; JPL
645928	2007 VL_{376}	—	November 1, 2007	Mount Lemmon	Mount Lemmon Survey	·	1.7 km	MPC; JPL
645929	2007 VL_{382}	—	November 3, 2007	Mount Lemmon	Mount Lemmon Survey	·	2.1 km	MPC; JPL
645930	2007 WJ_{7}	—	November 2, 2007	Kitt Peak	Spacewatch	JUN	970 m	MPC; JPL
645931	2007 WQ_{7}	—	November 19, 2007	Mount Lemmon	Mount Lemmon Survey	·	970 m	MPC; JPL
645932	2007 WC_{9}	—	November 16, 2007	Mount Lemmon	Mount Lemmon Survey	EOS	1.4 km	MPC; JPL
645933	2007 WM_{11}	—	November 9, 2007	Catalina	CSS	·	960 m	MPC; JPL
645934	2007 WF_{14}	—	November 4, 2007	Kitt Peak	Spacewatch	EOS	1.4 km	MPC; JPL
645935	2007 WT_{15}	—	November 3, 2007	Kitt Peak	Spacewatch	KOR	1.1 km	MPC; JPL
645936	2007 WB_{18}	—	November 18, 2007	Mount Lemmon	Mount Lemmon Survey	EOS	1.6 km	MPC; JPL
645937	2007 WF_{20}	—	November 18, 2007	Mount Lemmon	Mount Lemmon Survey	·	3.3 km	MPC; JPL
645938	2007 WE_{25}	—	February 18, 2004	La Silla	Barbieri, C.	EOS	1.5 km	MPC; JPL
645939	2007 WG_{26}	—	October 20, 2003	Kitt Peak	Spacewatch	·	1.1 km	MPC; JPL
645940	2007 WW_{26}	—	November 18, 2007	Mount Lemmon	Mount Lemmon Survey	EOS	1.5 km	MPC; JPL
645941	2007 WD_{27}	—	November 18, 2007	Mount Lemmon	Mount Lemmon Survey	·	2.3 km	MPC; JPL
645942	2007 WU_{30}	—	November 1, 2007	Kitt Peak	Spacewatch	·	790 m	MPC; JPL
645943	2007 WD_{31}	—	November 19, 2007	Mount Lemmon	Mount Lemmon Survey	(5)	870 m	MPC; JPL
645944	2007 WL_{33}	—	November 19, 2007	Mount Lemmon	Mount Lemmon Survey	EOS	1.7 km	MPC; JPL
645945	2007 WJ_{43}	—	October 20, 2007	Mount Lemmon	Mount Lemmon Survey	·	1.4 km	MPC; JPL
645946	2007 WA_{47}	—	November 3, 2007	Mount Lemmon	Mount Lemmon Survey	EMA	2.3 km	MPC; JPL
645947	2007 WB_{47}	—	November 3, 2007	Mount Lemmon	Mount Lemmon Survey	EOS	1.4 km	MPC; JPL
645948	2007 WH_{47}	—	November 20, 2007	Mount Lemmon	Mount Lemmon Survey	EOS	1.4 km	MPC; JPL
645949	2007 WS_{47}	—	November 2, 2007	Kitt Peak	Spacewatch	·	2.3 km	MPC; JPL
645950	2007 WY_{48}	—	November 4, 2007	Kitt Peak	Spacewatch	NYS	1.2 km	MPC; JPL
645951	2007 WD_{51}	—	November 8, 2007	Kitt Peak	Spacewatch	·	600 m	MPC; JPL
645952	2007 WW_{53}	—	November 2, 2007	Mount Lemmon	Mount Lemmon Survey	·	1.2 km	MPC; JPL
645953	2007 WS_{54}	—	November 4, 2007	Kitt Peak	Spacewatch	·	2.6 km	MPC; JPL
645954	2007 WS_{58}	—	November 18, 2007	Kitt Peak	Spacewatch	·	1.5 km	MPC; JPL
645955	2007 WY_{63}	—	November 17, 2007	Kitt Peak	Spacewatch	·	1.6 km	MPC; JPL
645956	2007 WA_{65}	—	November 18, 2007	Mount Lemmon	Mount Lemmon Survey	·	1.4 km	MPC; JPL
645957	2007 WJ_{68}	—	October 8, 2012	Kitt Peak	Spacewatch	·	1.1 km	MPC; JPL
645958	2007 WO_{68}	—	January 11, 2014	Kitt Peak	Spacewatch	EOS	1.5 km	MPC; JPL
645959	2007 WQ_{68}	—	September 10, 2012	Bergisch Gladbach	W. Bickel	EMA	2.4 km	MPC; JPL
645960	2007 WD_{69}	—	November 20, 2007	Catalina	CSS	·	2.6 km	MPC; JPL
645961	2007 WK_{69}	—	November 18, 2007	Kitt Peak	Spacewatch	EOS	1.4 km	MPC; JPL
645962	2007 WF_{70}	—	November 18, 2011	Mount Lemmon	Mount Lemmon Survey	·	960 m	MPC; JPL
645963	2007 WK_{70}	—	November 18, 2007	Kitt Peak	Spacewatch	·	1.9 km	MPC; JPL
645964	2007 WW_{70}	—	May 2, 2017	Mount Lemmon	Mount Lemmon Survey	·	1.0 km	MPC; JPL
645965	2007 WA_{72}	—	November 19, 2007	Kitt Peak	Spacewatch	·	910 m	MPC; JPL
645966	2007 WG_{72}	—	November 19, 2007	Mount Lemmon	Mount Lemmon Survey	EOS	1.3 km	MPC; JPL
645967	2007 WK_{73}	—	November 18, 2007	Mount Lemmon	Mount Lemmon Survey	3:2	3.8 km	MPC; JPL
645968	2007 WN_{73}	—	November 18, 2007	Mount Lemmon	Mount Lemmon Survey	·	2.1 km	MPC; JPL
645969	2007 WA_{74}	—	November 18, 2007	Mount Lemmon	Mount Lemmon Survey	·	1.3 km	MPC; JPL
645970	2007 WB_{74}	—	November 20, 2007	Catalina	CSS	·	2.4 km	MPC; JPL
645971	2007 WK_{75}	—	November 20, 2007	Kitt Peak	Spacewatch	·	2.2 km	MPC; JPL
645972	2007 XX_{3}	—	December 3, 2007	Kitt Peak	Spacewatch	·	2.7 km	MPC; JPL
645973	2007 XF_{8}	—	December 4, 2007	Catalina	CSS	·	1.5 km	MPC; JPL
645974	2007 XF_{13}	—	September 13, 2007	Mount Lemmon	Mount Lemmon Survey	NYS	1.0 km	MPC; JPL
645975	2007 XU_{19}	—	December 4, 2007	Catalina	CSS	·	1.2 km	MPC; JPL
645976	2007 XC_{23}	—	December 14, 2007	Wrightwood	J. W. Young	·	1.6 km	MPC; JPL
645977	2007 XX_{27}	—	December 14, 2007	Mount Lemmon	Mount Lemmon Survey	AEG	2.8 km	MPC; JPL
645978	2007 XF_{28}	—	December 15, 2007	Kitt Peak	Spacewatch	·	1.4 km	MPC; JPL
645979	2007 XU_{42}	—	December 15, 2007	Kitt Peak	Spacewatch	·	920 m	MPC; JPL
645980	2007 XC_{49}	—	November 19, 2007	Mount Lemmon	Mount Lemmon Survey	·	2.2 km	MPC; JPL
645981	2007 XG_{49}	—	November 2, 2007	Mount Lemmon	Mount Lemmon Survey	EOS	1.9 km	MPC; JPL
645982	2007 XJ_{49}	—	December 4, 2007	Mount Lemmon	Mount Lemmon Survey	EUN	1.2 km	MPC; JPL
645983	2007 XA_{52}	—	December 5, 2007	Kitt Peak	Spacewatch	·	780 m	MPC; JPL
645984	2007 XK_{57}	—	November 3, 2007	Kitt Peak	Spacewatch	PHO	860 m	MPC; JPL
645985	2007 XK_{59}	—	February 11, 2004	Palomar	NEAT	·	990 m	MPC; JPL
645986	2007 XK_{60}	—	December 6, 2007	Mount Lemmon	Mount Lemmon Survey	·	810 m	MPC; JPL
645987	2007 XN_{60}	—	December 3, 2007	Kitt Peak	Spacewatch	·	1.0 km	MPC; JPL
645988	2007 XM_{61}	—	June 14, 2010	Mount Lemmon	Mount Lemmon Survey	·	1.1 km	MPC; JPL
645989	2007 XO_{61}	—	December 14, 2007	Mount Lemmon	Mount Lemmon Survey	·	2.5 km	MPC; JPL
645990	2007 XR_{61}	—	December 15, 2007	Kitt Peak	Spacewatch	·	2.4 km	MPC; JPL
645991	2007 XS_{61}	—	December 15, 2007	Kitt Peak	Spacewatch	·	2.6 km	MPC; JPL
645992	2007 XU_{61}	—	November 13, 2012	Nogales	M. Schwartz, P. R. Holvorcem	·	2.5 km	MPC; JPL
645993	2007 XD_{62}	—	October 21, 2012	Haleakala	Pan-STARRS 1	EOS	1.7 km	MPC; JPL
645994	2007 XE_{62}	—	August 15, 2017	Haleakala	Pan-STARRS 1	·	2.2 km	MPC; JPL
645995	2007 XC_{63}	—	November 8, 2007	Kitt Peak	Spacewatch	·	490 m	MPC; JPL
645996	2007 XK_{63}	—	November 14, 2012	Kitt Peak	Spacewatch	KOR	1.1 km	MPC; JPL
645997	2007 XQ_{63}	—	November 17, 2011	Mount Lemmon	Mount Lemmon Survey	·	830 m	MPC; JPL
645998	2007 XR_{63}	—	October 8, 2012	Haleakala	Pan-STARRS 1	·	2.3 km	MPC; JPL
645999	2007 XC_{64}	—	December 4, 2007	Kitt Peak	Spacewatch	H	400 m	MPC; JPL
646000	2007 XD_{64}	—	December 3, 2007	Kitt Peak	Spacewatch	·	2.9 km	MPC; JPL

back to top

== See also ==
- Meanings of minor-planet names: 645001–646000
