= List of minor planets: 813001–814000 =

The following is a partial list of minor planets, running from minor-planet number 813001 through 814000, inclusive. The primary data for this and other partial lists is based on JPL's "Small-Body Orbital Elements" and data available from the Minor Planet Center. Critical list information is also provided by the MPC, unless otherwise specified from Lowell Observatory. A detailed description of the table's columns and additional sources are given on the main page including a complete list of every page in this series, and a statistical break-up on the dynamical classification of minor planets.

Also see the summary list of all named bodies in numerical and alphabetical order, and the corresponding naming citations for the number range of this particular list. New namings may only be added to this list after official publication, as the preannouncement of names is condemned by the Working Group for Small Bodies Nomenclature of the International Astronomical Union.

Near-Earth obj.	MBA (inner)	MBA (outer)	Centaur
Mars-crosser	MBA (middle)	Jupiter trojan	Trans-Neptunian obj.
Unclassified

== 813001–813100 ==
Designation			Discovery			Properties		Ref
Permanent	Provisional	Named after	Date	Site	Discoverer(s)	Category	Diam.	Ref
813001	2006 EH_{52}	—	March 4, 2006	Kitt Peak	Spacewatch	·	690 m	MPC · JPL
813002	2006 EX_{56}	—	March 5, 2006	Kitt Peak	Spacewatch	·	920 m	MPC · JPL
813003	2006 EH_{77}	—	March 5, 2006	Kitt Peak	Spacewatch	·	1.3 km	MPC · JPL
813004	2006 EJ_{78}	—	March 5, 2006	Mount Lemmon	Mount Lemmon Survey	·	2.2 km	MPC · JPL
813005	2006 EN_{79}	—	August 20, 2015	Kitt Peak	Spacewatch	·	920 m	MPC · JPL
813006	2006 EH_{83}	—	March 2, 2006	Kitt Peak	Spacewatch	H	320 m	MPC · JPL
813007	2006 EO_{83}	—	March 2, 2006	Kitt Peak	Spacewatch	·	830 m	MPC · JPL
813008	2006 FV_{3}	—	March 23, 2006	Kitt Peak	Spacewatch	·	970 m	MPC · JPL
813009	2006 FZ_{26}	—	March 24, 2006	Mount Lemmon	Mount Lemmon Survey	NYS	960 m	MPC · JPL
813010	2006 FK_{33}	—	March 25, 2006	Mount Lemmon	Mount Lemmon Survey	·	590 m	MPC · JPL
813011	2006 FE_{59}	—	November 16, 2014	Mount Lemmon	Mount Lemmon Survey	·	460 m	MPC · JPL
813012	2006 FK_{61}	—	March 25, 2006	Mount Lemmon	Mount Lemmon Survey	·	760 m	MPC · JPL
813013	2006 FA_{62}	—	March 25, 2006	Mount Lemmon	Mount Lemmon Survey	·	890 m	MPC · JPL
813014	2006 GW_{20}	—	March 23, 2006	Kitt Peak	Spacewatch	·	1.8 km	MPC · JPL
813015	2006 GP_{24}	—	March 24, 2006	Mount Lemmon	Mount Lemmon Survey	·	1.4 km	MPC · JPL
813016	2006 GB_{25}	—	April 2, 2006	Kitt Peak	Spacewatch	·	910 m	MPC · JPL
813017	2006 GD_{25}	—	April 2, 2006	Kitt Peak	Spacewatch	·	850 m	MPC · JPL
813018	2006 GS_{25}	—	April 2, 2006	Kitt Peak	Spacewatch	NYS	790 m	MPC · JPL
813019	2006 GJ_{28}	—	March 25, 2006	Kitt Peak	Spacewatch	·	910 m	MPC · JPL
813020	2006 GJ_{36}	—	March 24, 2006	Kitt Peak	Spacewatch	PHO	810 m	MPC · JPL
813021	2006 GO_{36}	—	April 8, 2006	Kitt Peak	Spacewatch	·	770 m	MPC · JPL
813022	2006 GA_{48}	—	April 9, 2006	Kitt Peak	Spacewatch	·	3.0 km	MPC · JPL
813023	2006 GW_{56}	—	April 4, 2014	Mount Lemmon	Mount Lemmon Survey	H	310 m	MPC · JPL
813024	2006 GN_{57}	—	September 22, 2008	Kitt Peak	Spacewatch	·	1.5 km	MPC · JPL
813025	2006 GO_{59}	—	April 8, 2006	Mount Lemmon	Mount Lemmon Survey	MAS	580 m	MPC · JPL
813026	2006 HR_{11}	—	April 19, 2006	Mount Lemmon	Mount Lemmon Survey	TIR	2.1 km	MPC · JPL
813027	2006 HT_{19}	—	March 23, 2006	Kitt Peak	Spacewatch	·	710 m	MPC · JPL
813028	2006 HE_{20}	—	September 18, 2003	Kitt Peak	Spacewatch	·	930 m	MPC · JPL
813029	2006 HF_{61}	—	March 23, 2006	Kitt Peak	Spacewatch	·	2.1 km	MPC · JPL
813030	2006 HJ_{70}	—	March 24, 2006	Kitt Peak	Spacewatch	·	940 m	MPC · JPL
813031	2006 HW_{86}	—	March 25, 2006	Kitt Peak	Spacewatch	PHO	810 m	MPC · JPL
813032	2006 HW_{97}	—	April 30, 2006	Kitt Peak	Spacewatch	MAS	540 m	MPC · JPL
813033	2006 HZ_{103}	—	April 30, 2006	Kitt Peak	Spacewatch	·	1.8 km	MPC · JPL
813034	2006 HE_{106}	—	April 30, 2006	Kitt Peak	Spacewatch	3:2	4.3 km	MPC · JPL
813035	2006 HG_{109}	—	April 30, 2006	Kitt Peak	Spacewatch	·	770 m	MPC · JPL
813036	2006 HX_{115}	—	August 7, 2018	Haleakala	Pan-STARRS 1	·	870 m	MPC · JPL
813037	2006 HE_{122}	—	April 30, 2006	Kitt Peak	Spacewatch	·	1.9 km	MPC · JPL
813038	2006 HR_{126}	—	April 30, 2006	Kitt Peak	Spacewatch	·	2.6 km	MPC · JPL
813039	2006 HK_{136}	—	March 24, 2006	Mount Lemmon	Mount Lemmon Survey	NYS	940 m	MPC · JPL
813040	2006 HK_{140}	—	April 26, 2006	Cerro Tololo	Deep Ecliptic Survey	·	2.7 km	MPC · JPL
813041	2006 HW_{140}	—	April 27, 2006	Cerro Tololo	Deep Ecliptic Survey	MAS	560 m	MPC · JPL
813042	2006 HF_{143}	—	April 27, 2006	Cerro Tololo	Deep Ecliptic Survey	·	800 m	MPC · JPL
813043	2006 HB_{147}	—	April 27, 2006	Cerro Tololo	Deep Ecliptic Survey	·	2.0 km	MPC · JPL
813044	2006 HE_{154}	—	April 26, 2006	Kitt Peak	Spacewatch	·	1.1 km	MPC · JPL
813045	2006 HF_{155}	—	April 26, 2006	Mount Lemmon	Mount Lemmon Survey	PHO	770 m	MPC · JPL
813046	2006 HX_{155}	—	April 8, 2006	Kitt Peak	Spacewatch	NYS	830 m	MPC · JPL
813047	2006 HB_{156}	—	June 21, 2014	Haleakala	Pan-STARRS 1	NYS	870 m	MPC · JPL
813048	2006 HD_{156}	—	April 30, 2006	Kitt Peak	Spacewatch	·	530 m	MPC · JPL
813049	2006 HP_{157}	—	February 4, 2009	Mount Lemmon	Mount Lemmon Survey	·	450 m	MPC · JPL
813050	2006 HV_{158}	—	April 20, 2006	Kitt Peak	Spacewatch	·	1.0 km	MPC · JPL
813051	2006 HX_{158}	—	October 19, 2011	Kitt Peak	Spacewatch	NYS	820 m	MPC · JPL
813052	2006 HB_{159}	—	January 5, 2017	Mount Lemmon	Mount Lemmon Survey	·	890 m	MPC · JPL
813053	2006 HD_{159}	—	June 12, 2012	Mount Lemmon	Mount Lemmon Survey	TIR	1.9 km	MPC · JPL
813054	2006 HL_{159}	—	January 26, 2017	Mount Lemmon	Mount Lemmon Survey	·	810 m	MPC · JPL
813055	2006 HJ_{160}	—	April 26, 2006	Kitt Peak	Spacewatch	·	860 m	MPC · JPL
813056	2006 HL_{160}	—	April 26, 2006	Kitt Peak	Spacewatch	·	830 m	MPC · JPL
813057	2006 JB_{8}	—	May 1, 2006	Kitt Peak	Spacewatch	MIS	1.9 km	MPC · JPL
813058	2006 JC_{9}	—	May 1, 2006	Kitt Peak	Spacewatch	MAS	550 m	MPC · JPL
813059	2006 JS_{9}	—	May 1, 2006	Kitt Peak	Spacewatch	JUN	780 m	MPC · JPL
813060	2006 JC_{16}	—	May 2, 2006	Mount Lemmon	Mount Lemmon Survey	·	1.6 km	MPC · JPL
813061	2006 JL_{18}	—	May 2, 2006	Mount Lemmon	Mount Lemmon Survey	H	330 m	MPC · JPL
813062	2006 JJ_{22}	—	May 2, 2006	Kitt Peak	Spacewatch	·	1.4 km	MPC · JPL
813063	2006 JS_{23}	—	May 3, 2006	Mount Lemmon	Mount Lemmon Survey	MAS	540 m	MPC · JPL
813064	2006 JX_{25}	—	September 28, 2003	Socorro	LINEAR	AMO	350 m	MPC · JPL
813065	2006 JK_{34}	—	May 4, 2006	Kitt Peak	Spacewatch	·	890 m	MPC · JPL
813066	2006 JL_{38}	—	April 20, 2006	Kitt Peak	Spacewatch	·	810 m	MPC · JPL
813067	2006 JH_{40}	—	May 7, 2006	Mount Lemmon	Mount Lemmon Survey	·	720 m	MPC · JPL
813068	2006 JC_{41}	—	May 7, 2006	Kitt Peak	Spacewatch	·	1.5 km	MPC · JPL
813069	2006 JJ_{41}	—	April 29, 2006	Kitt Peak	Spacewatch	T_{j} (2.98)	2.9 km	MPC · JPL
813070	2006 JV_{63}	—	March 2, 2006	Mount Lemmon	Mount Lemmon Survey	·	690 m	MPC · JPL
813071	2006 JV_{66}	—	May 6, 2006	Mount Lemmon	Mount Lemmon Survey	·	740 m	MPC · JPL
813072	2006 JK_{69}	—	May 1, 2006	Mauna Kea	P. A. Wiegert	·	1.9 km	MPC · JPL
813073	2006 JU_{74}	—	May 1, 2006	Mauna Kea	P. A. Wiegert	·	1.5 km	MPC · JPL
813074	2006 JC_{75}	—	May 1, 2006	Mauna Kea	P. A. Wiegert	MAS	490 m	MPC · JPL
813075	2006 JE_{77}	—	May 2, 2006	Mount Lemmon	Mount Lemmon Survey	MAS	510 m	MPC · JPL
813076	2006 JL_{82}	—	May 2, 2006	Mount Lemmon	Mount Lemmon Survey	·	800 m	MPC · JPL
813077	2006 JP_{82}	—	October 1, 2000	Socorro	LINEAR	·	480 m	MPC · JPL
813078	2006 JV_{82}	—	June 28, 2014	Kitt Peak	Spacewatch	NYS	910 m	MPC · JPL
813079	2006 JG_{83}	—	May 3, 2006	Mount Lemmon	Mount Lemmon Survey	·	520 m	MPC · JPL
813080	2006 JN_{85}	—	November 26, 2013	Mount Lemmon	Mount Lemmon Survey	·	850 m	MPC · JPL
813081	2006 JM_{86}	—	November 2, 2015	Mount Lemmon	Mount Lemmon Survey	H	520 m	MPC · JPL
813082	2006 JV_{86}	—	March 21, 2017	Haleakala	Pan-STARRS 1	·	2.3 km	MPC · JPL
813083	2006 JR_{87}	—	May 6, 2006	Kitt Peak	Spacewatch	·	820 m	MPC · JPL
813084	2006 JB_{88}	—	May 8, 2006	Mount Lemmon	Mount Lemmon Survey	LIX	2.7 km	MPC · JPL
813085	2006 JO_{89}	—	May 3, 2006	Kitt Peak	Spacewatch	NYS	990 m	MPC · JPL
813086	2006 JC_{90}	—	May 6, 2006	Kitt Peak	Spacewatch	·	480 m	MPC · JPL
813087	2006 KK_{4}	—	May 19, 2006	Mount Lemmon	Mount Lemmon Survey	·	520 m	MPC · JPL
813088	2006 KS_{8}	—	May 19, 2006	Mount Lemmon	Mount Lemmon Survey	·	980 m	MPC · JPL
813089	2006 KS_{21}	—	May 19, 2006	Catalina	CSS	H	460 m	MPC · JPL
813090	2006 KC_{34}	—	May 20, 2006	Kitt Peak	Spacewatch	NYS	840 m	MPC · JPL
813091	2006 KK_{34}	—	May 20, 2006	Kitt Peak	Spacewatch	·	810 m	MPC · JPL
813092	2006 KP_{46}	—	May 21, 2006	Mount Lemmon	Mount Lemmon Survey	·	500 m	MPC · JPL
813093	2006 KE_{50}	—	May 21, 2006	Kitt Peak	Spacewatch	·	530 m	MPC · JPL
813094	2006 KD_{67}	—	May 24, 2006	Mount Lemmon	Mount Lemmon Survey	·	480 m	MPC · JPL
813095	2006 KK_{86}	—	April 27, 2006	Catalina	CSS	·	470 m	MPC · JPL
813096	2006 KV_{91}	—	April 30, 2006	Kitt Peak	Spacewatch	·	890 m	MPC · JPL
813097	2006 KO_{98}	—	May 26, 2006	Kitt Peak	Spacewatch	·	500 m	MPC · JPL
813098	2006 KF_{121}	—	July 18, 2001	Palomar	NEAT	·	1.1 km	MPC · JPL
813099	2006 KK_{141}	—	May 25, 2006	Mauna Kea	P. A. Wiegert	·	860 m	MPC · JPL
813100	2006 KR_{147}	—	October 12, 2013	Kitt Peak	Spacewatch	·	2.2 km	MPC · JPL

== 813101–813200 ==
back to top

Designation			Discovery			Properties		Ref
Permanent	Provisional	Named after	Date	Site	Discoverer(s)	Category	Diam.	Ref
813101	2006 KA_{148}	—	May 21, 2006	Kitt Peak	Spacewatch	·	470 m	MPC · JPL
813102	2006 KO_{148}	—	May 21, 2006	Kitt Peak	Spacewatch	·	800 m	MPC · JPL
813103	2006 KC_{149}	—	March 19, 2009	Mount Lemmon	Mount Lemmon Survey	·	460 m	MPC · JPL
813104	2006 KZ_{150}	—	July 15, 2013	Haleakala	Pan-STARRS 1	·	530 m	MPC · JPL
813105	2006 KN_{151}	—	May 20, 2012	Kitt Peak	Spacewatch	·	3.4 km	MPC · JPL
813106	2006 KC_{152}	—	May 28, 2006	Kitt Peak	Spacewatch	·	2.3 km	MPC · JPL
813107	2006 KY_{153}	—	October 6, 2013	Kitt Peak	Spacewatch	·	2.3 km	MPC · JPL
813108	2006 KB_{155}	—	October 30, 2017	Haleakala	Pan-STARRS 1	·	420 m	MPC · JPL
813109	2006 LE_{6}	—	June 4, 2006	Mount Lemmon	Mount Lemmon Survey	·	970 m	MPC · JPL
813110	2006 LO_{8}	—	March 7, 2017	Haleakala	Pan-STARRS 1	·	2.3 km	MPC · JPL
813111	2006 LZ_{8}	—	November 4, 2016	Haleakala	Pan-STARRS 1	·	700 m	MPC · JPL
813112	2006 MT_{4}	—	June 17, 2006	Kitt Peak	Spacewatch	H	410 m	MPC · JPL
813113	2006 OF_{10}	—	July 25, 2006	Vallemare Borbona	V. S. Casulli	·	1.1 km	MPC · JPL
813114	2006 OS_{33}	—	October 4, 2003	Kitt Peak	Spacewatch	·	570 m	MPC · JPL
813115	2006 OQ_{34}	—	May 25, 2006	Mount Lemmon	Mount Lemmon Survey	·	620 m	MPC · JPL
813116	2006 OR_{38}	—	October 17, 2010	Mount Lemmon	Mount Lemmon Survey	·	680 m	MPC · JPL
813117	2006 OB_{39}	—	January 17, 2018	Mount Lemmon	Mount Lemmon Survey	H	400 m	MPC · JPL
813118	2006 OE_{39}	—	March 13, 2015	Mount Lemmon	Mount Lemmon Survey	·	450 m	MPC · JPL
813119	2006 OR_{39}	—	May 14, 2009	Kitt Peak	Spacewatch	·	450 m	MPC · JPL
813120	2006 PW_{20}	—	August 15, 2006	Palomar	NEAT	·	1.1 km	MPC · JPL
813121	2006 PO_{33}	—	July 25, 2006	Palomar	NEAT	·	550 m	MPC · JPL
813122	2006 PZ_{38}	—	August 15, 2006	Palomar	NEAT	·	980 m	MPC · JPL
813123	2006 PF_{44}	—	June 7, 2016	Mount Lemmon	Mount Lemmon Survey	·	550 m	MPC · JPL
813124	2006 QG	—	August 18, 2006	Anderson Mesa	LONEOS	·	450 m	MPC · JPL
813125	2006 QB_{9}	—	August 19, 2006	Kitt Peak	Spacewatch	·	1.6 km	MPC · JPL
813126	2006 QO_{25}	—	August 18, 2006	Kitt Peak	Spacewatch	·	770 m	MPC · JPL
813127	2006 QL_{33}	—	August 24, 2006	Pian dei Termini	San Marcello Observatory	·	810 m	MPC · JPL
813128	2006 QK_{39}	—	August 19, 2006	Anderson Mesa	LONEOS	·	560 m	MPC · JPL
813129	2006 QY_{60}	—	August 19, 2006	Kitt Peak	Spacewatch	·	1.3 km	MPC · JPL
813130	2006 QB_{64}	—	August 17, 2006	Palomar	NEAT	·	520 m	MPC · JPL
813131	2006 QE_{68}	—	August 21, 2006	Kitt Peak	Spacewatch	·	1.2 km	MPC · JPL
813132	2006 QA_{86}	—	August 27, 2006	Kitt Peak	Spacewatch	·	1.0 km	MPC · JPL
813133	2006 QG_{113}	—	August 24, 2006	Socorro	LINEAR	·	480 m	MPC · JPL
813134	2006 QP_{137}	—	September 27, 2003	Kitt Peak	Spacewatch	·	450 m	MPC · JPL
813135	2006 QL_{159}	—	August 19, 2006	Kitt Peak	Spacewatch	·	530 m	MPC · JPL
813136	2006 QF_{165}	—	August 15, 2006	Palomar	NEAT	T_{j} (2.96)	3.0 km	MPC · JPL
813137	2006 QD_{169}	—	August 31, 2006	Socorro	LINEAR	·	1.4 km	MPC · JPL
813138	2006 QU_{183}	—	July 11, 2016	Haleakala	Pan-STARRS 1	·	540 m	MPC · JPL
813139	2006 QV_{185}	—	August 28, 2006	Kitt Peak	Spacewatch	·	500 m	MPC · JPL
813140	2006 QR_{188}	—	August 19, 2006	Anderson Mesa	LONEOS	·	480 m	MPC · JPL
813141	2006 QX_{191}	—	January 14, 2011	Mount Lemmon	Mount Lemmon Survey	·	500 m	MPC · JPL
813142	2006 QS_{192}	—	August 19, 2006	Kitt Peak	Spacewatch	·	1.6 km	MPC · JPL
813143	2006 QY_{192}	—	August 27, 2006	Kitt Peak	Spacewatch	·	1.4 km	MPC · JPL
813144	2006 QG_{193}	—	August 28, 2006	Kitt Peak	Spacewatch	·	1.4 km	MPC · JPL
813145	2006 QL_{193}	—	August 28, 2006	Kitt Peak	Spacewatch	·	510 m	MPC · JPL
813146	2006 QQ_{193}	—	September 26, 1995	Kitt Peak	Spacewatch	NYS	780 m	MPC · JPL
813147	2006 QX_{194}	—	April 30, 2012	Mount Lemmon	Mount Lemmon Survey	·	500 m	MPC · JPL
813148	2006 QD_{195}	—	September 19, 2010	Kitt Peak	Spacewatch	·	1 km	MPC · JPL
813149	2006 QM_{200}	—	February 20, 2015	Haleakala	Pan-STARRS 1	·	570 m	MPC · JPL
813150	2006 QD_{201}	—	October 6, 2012	Haleakala	Pan-STARRS 1	·	2.2 km	MPC · JPL
813151	2006 QD_{203}	—	August 18, 2006	Kitt Peak	Spacewatch	·	2.1 km	MPC · JPL
813152	2006 QT_{203}	—	August 27, 2006	Kitt Peak	Spacewatch	·	520 m	MPC · JPL
813153	2006 QQ_{209}	—	August 19, 2006	Kitt Peak	Spacewatch	·	470 m	MPC · JPL
813154	2006 QB_{210}	—	August 29, 2006	Kitt Peak	Spacewatch	·	1.6 km	MPC · JPL
813155	2006 RT_{40}	—	September 14, 2006	Kitt Peak	Spacewatch	·	530 m	MPC · JPL
813156	2006 RZ_{49}	—	September 14, 2006	Kitt Peak	Spacewatch	·	1.2 km	MPC · JPL
813157	2006 RZ_{53}	—	September 14, 2006	Kitt Peak	Spacewatch	·	790 m	MPC · JPL
813158	2006 RT_{64}	—	September 14, 2006	Kitt Peak	Spacewatch	·	620 m	MPC · JPL
813159	2006 RS_{113}	—	September 18, 2006	Kitt Peak	Spacewatch	·	1.4 km	MPC · JPL
813160	2006 RH_{114}	—	September 25, 2006	Mount Lemmon	Mount Lemmon Survey	AST	1.3 km	MPC · JPL
813161	2006 RM_{114}	—	September 14, 2006	Mauna Kea	Masiero, J., R. Jedicke	MAS	490 m	MPC · JPL
813162	2006 RF_{125}	—	September 15, 2006	Kitt Peak	Spacewatch	·	560 m	MPC · JPL
813163	2006 RL_{125}	—	September 15, 2006	Kitt Peak	Spacewatch	·	640 m	MPC · JPL
813164	2006 SM_{9}	—	September 16, 2006	Kitt Peak	Spacewatch	·	520 m	MPC · JPL
813165	2006 SL_{13}	—	September 17, 2006	Catalina	CSS	ADE	1.7 km	MPC · JPL
813166	2006 ST_{47}	—	July 21, 2006	Mount Lemmon	Mount Lemmon Survey	·	940 m	MPC · JPL
813167	2006 SA_{82}	—	September 18, 2006	Kitt Peak	Spacewatch	HOF	1.7 km	MPC · JPL
813168	2006 SY_{83}	—	September 18, 2006	Kitt Peak	Spacewatch	AGN	910 m	MPC · JPL
813169	2006 SZ_{84}	—	September 18, 2006	Kitt Peak	Spacewatch	·	1.8 km	MPC · JPL
813170	2006 SB_{88}	—	September 18, 2006	Kitt Peak	Spacewatch	·	1.5 km	MPC · JPL
813171	2006 SR_{107}	—	September 19, 2006	Catalina	CSS	PHO	730 m	MPC · JPL
813172	2006 SD_{109}	—	September 19, 2006	Kitt Peak	Spacewatch	NYS	760 m	MPC · JPL
813173	2006 SB_{115}	—	January 15, 2004	Kitt Peak	Spacewatch	·	550 m	MPC · JPL
813174	2006 SW_{136}	—	August 30, 2006	Anderson Mesa	LONEOS	·	530 m	MPC · JPL
813175	2006 SP_{144}	—	September 19, 2006	Kitt Peak	Spacewatch	·	1.5 km	MPC · JPL
813176	2006 SL_{151}	—	September 15, 2006	Kitt Peak	Spacewatch	·	1.9 km	MPC · JPL
813177	2006 SO_{156}	—	September 15, 2006	Kitt Peak	Spacewatch	·	930 m	MPC · JPL
813178	2006 SZ_{160}	—	September 23, 2006	Kitt Peak	Spacewatch	·	830 m	MPC · JPL
813179	2006 SH_{162}	—	September 24, 2006	Kitt Peak	Spacewatch	·	500 m	MPC · JPL
813180	2006 SA_{174}	—	August 19, 2006	Kitt Peak	Spacewatch	·	1.3 km	MPC · JPL
813181	2006 SK_{174}	—	September 25, 2006	Kitt Peak	Spacewatch	·	1.5 km	MPC · JPL
813182	2006 SJ_{176}	—	September 25, 2006	Mount Lemmon	Mount Lemmon Survey	·	540 m	MPC · JPL
813183	2006 SO_{180}	—	September 19, 2006	Kitt Peak	Spacewatch	·	1.5 km	MPC · JPL
813184	2006 SC_{183}	—	September 25, 2006	Mount Lemmon	Mount Lemmon Survey	·	2.4 km	MPC · JPL
813185	2006 SD_{187}	—	September 26, 2006	Kitt Peak	Spacewatch	·	770 m	MPC · JPL
813186	2006 SP_{193}	—	September 14, 2006	Palomar	NEAT	·	1.2 km	MPC · JPL
813187	2006 SL_{195}	—	September 26, 2006	Kitt Peak	Spacewatch	·	2.2 km	MPC · JPL
813188	2006 SU_{195}	—	October 17, 2001	Kitt Peak	Spacewatch	·	1.1 km	MPC · JPL
813189	2006 ST_{201}	—	September 24, 2006	Kitt Peak	Spacewatch	EUN	860 m	MPC · JPL
813190	2006 SA_{217}	—	September 27, 2006	Kitt Peak	Spacewatch	·	700 m	MPC · JPL
813191	2006 SN_{219}	—	September 15, 2006	Kitt Peak	Spacewatch	·	1.1 km	MPC · JPL
813192	2006 SE_{223}	—	September 14, 2006	Kitt Peak	Spacewatch	·	1.3 km	MPC · JPL
813193	2006 SG_{226}	—	September 26, 2006	Kitt Peak	Spacewatch	·	560 m	MPC · JPL
813194	2006 SH_{229}	—	September 18, 2006	Kitt Peak	Spacewatch	·	1.2 km	MPC · JPL
813195	2006 SQ_{235}	—	August 12, 1999	Kitt Peak	Spacewatch	·	560 m	MPC · JPL
813196	2006 SL_{249}	—	September 26, 2006	Kitt Peak	Spacewatch	3:2 · SHU	3.9 km	MPC · JPL
813197	2006 SR_{263}	—	September 26, 2006	Kitt Peak	Spacewatch	·	1.5 km	MPC · JPL
813198	2006 SX_{264}	—	September 26, 2006	Kitt Peak	Spacewatch	·	550 m	MPC · JPL
813199	2006 SQ_{267}	—	September 26, 2006	Kitt Peak	Spacewatch	·	2.3 km	MPC · JPL
813200	2006 SK_{273}	—	September 27, 2006	Mount Lemmon	Mount Lemmon Survey	·	620 m	MPC · JPL

== 813201–813300 ==
back to top

Designation			Discovery			Properties		Ref
Permanent	Provisional	Named after	Date	Site	Discoverer(s)	Category	Diam.	Ref
813201	2006 SD_{278}	—	August 29, 2006	Kitt Peak	Spacewatch	·	820 m	MPC · JPL
813202	2006 SV_{278}	—	September 28, 2006	Kitt Peak	Spacewatch	·	560 m	MPC · JPL
813203	2006 SM_{303}	—	September 27, 2006	Anderson Mesa	LONEOS	KON	1.8 km	MPC · JPL
813204	2006 SD_{307}	—	September 17, 2006	Kitt Peak	Spacewatch	(2076)	490 m	MPC · JPL
813205	2006 SC_{308}	—	September 27, 2006	Kitt Peak	Spacewatch	·	580 m	MPC · JPL
813206	2006 SW_{312}	—	September 27, 2006	Kitt Peak	Spacewatch	·	1.5 km	MPC · JPL
813207	2006 SX_{313}	—	September 17, 2006	Kitt Peak	Spacewatch	·	590 m	MPC · JPL
813208	2006 SO_{326}	—	September 19, 2006	Kitt Peak	Spacewatch	·	1.2 km	MPC · JPL
813209	2006 SE_{337}	—	September 28, 2006	Kitt Peak	Spacewatch	·	530 m	MPC · JPL
813210	2006 SH_{338}	—	September 28, 2006	Kitt Peak	Spacewatch	·	580 m	MPC · JPL
813211	2006 SB_{362}	—	September 30, 2006	Mount Lemmon	Mount Lemmon Survey	·	640 m	MPC · JPL
813212	2006 SR_{373}	—	September 16, 2006	Sacramento Peak	SDSS Collaboration	KOR	1.0 km	MPC · JPL
813213	2006 SC_{377}	—	November 24, 2006	Mount Lemmon	Mount Lemmon Survey	·	530 m	MPC · JPL
813214	2006 SX_{381}	—	September 17, 2006	Sacramento Peak	SDSS Collaboration	·	480 m	MPC · JPL
813215	2006 SO_{383}	—	October 2, 2006	Mount Lemmon	Mount Lemmon Survey	·	1.5 km	MPC · JPL
813216	2006 SS_{384}	—	September 29, 2006	Sacramento Peak	SDSS Collaboration	·	940 m	MPC · JPL
813217	2006 SF_{388}	—	September 30, 2006	Sacramento Peak	SDSS Collaboration	·	530 m	MPC · JPL
813218	2006 ST_{411}	—	September 30, 2006	Catalina	CSS	·	510 m	MPC · JPL
813219	2006 SV_{415}	—	September 30, 2006	Mount Lemmon	Mount Lemmon Survey	·	1.2 km	MPC · JPL
813220	2006 SP_{416}	—	April 19, 2009	Mount Lemmon	Mount Lemmon Survey	·	1.1 km	MPC · JPL
813221	2006 SG_{422}	—	August 29, 2006	Catalina	CSS	H	430 m	MPC · JPL
813222	2006 ST_{426}	—	September 27, 2006	Mount Lemmon	Mount Lemmon Survey	·	930 m	MPC · JPL
813223	2006 SM_{428}	—	August 22, 1995	Kitt Peak	Spacewatch	·	730 m	MPC · JPL
813224	2006 SZ_{428}	—	July 2, 2013	Haleakala	Pan-STARRS 1	V	400 m	MPC · JPL
813225	2006 SJ_{431}	—	February 7, 2011	Mount Lemmon	Mount Lemmon Survey	·	540 m	MPC · JPL
813226	2006 SF_{434}	—	September 17, 2006	Kitt Peak	Spacewatch	MAR	700 m	MPC · JPL
813227	2006 SP_{435}	—	January 26, 2011	Mount Lemmon	Mount Lemmon Survey	·	500 m	MPC · JPL
813228	2006 SS_{435}	—	September 4, 2013	Mount Lemmon	Mount Lemmon Survey	·	600 m	MPC · JPL
813229	2006 SG_{437}	—	October 1, 2013	Mount Lemmon	Mount Lemmon Survey	·	680 m	MPC · JPL
813230	2006 SN_{437}	—	February 27, 2015	Haleakala	Pan-STARRS 1	·	500 m	MPC · JPL
813231	2006 SN_{438}	—	August 15, 2006	Lulin	LUSS	·	1.3 km	MPC · JPL
813232	2006 SS_{440}	—	September 19, 2006	Catalina	CSS	·	620 m	MPC · JPL
813233	2006 SL_{442}	—	May 18, 2012	Mount Lemmon	Mount Lemmon Survey	·	470 m	MPC · JPL
813234	2006 SX_{442}	—	September 26, 2006	Kitt Peak	Spacewatch	·	470 m	MPC · JPL
813235	2006 ST_{443}	—	September 28, 2006	Kitt Peak	Spacewatch	NYS	740 m	MPC · JPL
813236	2006 SD_{445}	—	February 5, 2013	Mount Lemmon	Mount Lemmon Survey	·	2.0 km	MPC · JPL
813237	2006 SK_{447}	—	September 30, 2006	Mount Lemmon	Mount Lemmon Survey	NYS	1.0 km	MPC · JPL
813238	2006 SA_{448}	—	September 26, 2006	Kitt Peak	Spacewatch	·	410 m	MPC · JPL
813239	2006 SB_{449}	—	September 18, 2006	Catalina	CSS	·	690 m	MPC · JPL
813240	2006 SN_{450}	—	September 17, 2006	Kitt Peak	Spacewatch	·	430 m	MPC · JPL
813241	2006 SA_{453}	—	September 16, 2006	Catalina	CSS	PHO	610 m	MPC · JPL
813242	2006 SZ_{455}	—	September 17, 2006	Kitt Peak	Spacewatch	·	700 m	MPC · JPL
813243	2006 SO_{458}	—	August 29, 2006	Kitt Peak	Spacewatch	EUP	2.6 km	MPC · JPL
813244	2006 SV_{459}	—	September 26, 2006	Kitt Peak	Spacewatch	V	440 m	MPC · JPL
813245	2006 SS_{461}	—	July 31, 2022	Haleakala	Pan-STARRS 2	·	1.2 km	MPC · JPL
813246	2006 SL_{462}	—	September 30, 2006	Mount Lemmon	Mount Lemmon Survey	·	2.3 km	MPC · JPL
813247	2006 TK	—	October 1, 2006	Mount Lemmon	Mount Lemmon Survey	AMO	350 m	MPC · JPL
813248	2006 TX_{2}	—	October 2, 2006	Mount Lemmon	Mount Lemmon Survey	·	500 m	MPC · JPL
813249	2006 TQ_{4}	—	October 2, 2006	Mount Lemmon	Mount Lemmon Survey	·	510 m	MPC · JPL
813250	2006 TG_{9}	—	October 4, 2006	Mount Lemmon	Mount Lemmon Survey	·	300 m	MPC · JPL
813251	2006 TV_{30}	—	September 26, 2006	Mount Lemmon	Mount Lemmon Survey	·	1.3 km	MPC · JPL
813252	2006 TL_{34}	—	October 12, 2006	Kitt Peak	Spacewatch	·	520 m	MPC · JPL
813253	2006 TK_{40}	—	October 12, 2006	Kitt Peak	Spacewatch	EOS	1.3 km	MPC · JPL
813254	2006 TC_{46}	—	October 12, 2006	Kitt Peak	Spacewatch	·	950 m	MPC · JPL
813255	2006 TF_{54}	—	September 25, 2006	Mount Lemmon	Mount Lemmon Survey	·	520 m	MPC · JPL
813256	2006 TR_{62}	—	October 2, 2006	Mount Lemmon	Mount Lemmon Survey	·	1.6 km	MPC · JPL
813257	2006 TQ_{63}	—	October 10, 2006	Palomar	NEAT	·	770 m	MPC · JPL
813258	2006 TR_{68}	—	October 4, 2006	Mount Lemmon	Mount Lemmon Survey	·	620 m	MPC · JPL
813259	2006 TU_{121}	—	October 2, 2006	Mount Lemmon	Mount Lemmon Survey	·	2.4 km	MPC · JPL
813260	2006 TS_{124}	—	October 4, 2006	Mount Lemmon	Mount Lemmon Survey	H	350 m	MPC · JPL
813261	2006 TY_{127}	—	October 13, 2006	Kitt Peak	Spacewatch	·	470 m	MPC · JPL
813262	2006 TR_{134}	—	October 2, 2006	Mount Lemmon	Mount Lemmon Survey	EOS	1.3 km	MPC · JPL
813263	2006 TY_{134}	—	October 11, 2006	Palomar	NEAT	·	580 m	MPC · JPL
813264	2006 TF_{135}	—	October 4, 2006	Mount Lemmon	Mount Lemmon Survey	V	470 m	MPC · JPL
813265	2006 TT_{136}	—	October 3, 2006	Mount Lemmon	Mount Lemmon Survey	·	570 m	MPC · JPL
813266	2006 TA_{137}	—	October 5, 2013	Haleakala	Pan-STARRS 1	·	540 m	MPC · JPL
813267	2006 TR_{137}	—	July 10, 2016	Mount Lemmon	Mount Lemmon Survey	·	580 m	MPC · JPL
813268	2006 TK_{138}	—	October 4, 2006	Mount Lemmon	Mount Lemmon Survey	·	610 m	MPC · JPL
813269	2006 TP_{138}	—	October 24, 2011	Haleakala	Pan-STARRS 1	·	1.5 km	MPC · JPL
813270	2006 TX_{140}	—	October 2, 2006	Mount Lemmon	Mount Lemmon Survey	·	1.4 km	MPC · JPL
813271	2006 TP_{142}	—	October 2, 2006	Mount Lemmon	Mount Lemmon Survey	·	530 m	MPC · JPL
813272	2006 TO_{145}	—	October 2, 2006	Mount Lemmon	Mount Lemmon Survey	·	900 m	MPC · JPL
813273	2006 UW_{3}	—	October 17, 2006	Mount Lemmon	Mount Lemmon Survey	·	1.3 km	MPC · JPL
813274	2006 UK_{18}	—	September 14, 2006	Catalina	CSS	·	980 m	MPC · JPL
813275	2006 UW_{36}	—	September 25, 2006	Mount Lemmon	Mount Lemmon Survey	EUN	990 m	MPC · JPL
813276	2006 UF_{47}	—	October 16, 2006	Kitt Peak	Spacewatch	THM	1.5 km	MPC · JPL
813277	2006 UK_{52}	—	October 17, 2006	Mount Lemmon	Mount Lemmon Survey	EOS	1.4 km	MPC · JPL
813278	2006 UT_{57}	—	October 3, 2006	Mount Lemmon	Mount Lemmon Survey	PHO	630 m	MPC · JPL
813279	2006 UZ_{72}	—	September 26, 2006	Kitt Peak	Spacewatch	·	440 m	MPC · JPL
813280	2006 UB_{83}	—	October 17, 2006	Mount Lemmon	Mount Lemmon Survey	·	550 m	MPC · JPL
813281	2006 UO_{95}	—	October 2, 2006	Mount Lemmon	Mount Lemmon Survey	DOR	1.7 km	MPC · JPL
813282	2006 UY_{105}	—	October 18, 2006	Kitt Peak	Spacewatch	·	530 m	MPC · JPL
813283	2006 UW_{111}	—	September 16, 2006	Kitt Peak	Spacewatch	·	480 m	MPC · JPL
813284	2006 UF_{125}	—	October 2, 2006	Mount Lemmon	Mount Lemmon Survey	·	940 m	MPC · JPL
813285	2006 UC_{126}	—	October 2, 2006	Mount Lemmon	Mount Lemmon Survey	·	740 m	MPC · JPL
813286	2006 UH_{132}	—	October 19, 2006	Mount Lemmon	Mount Lemmon Survey	·	480 m	MPC · JPL
813287	2006 UU_{145}	—	September 20, 2006	Anderson Mesa	LONEOS	·	970 m	MPC · JPL
813288	2006 UX_{169}	—	October 21, 2006	Mount Lemmon	Mount Lemmon Survey	·	590 m	MPC · JPL
813289	2006 UQ_{172}	—	September 19, 2006	Kitt Peak	Spacewatch	·	630 m	MPC · JPL
813290	2006 UH_{176}	—	October 16, 2006	Catalina	CSS	·	460 m	MPC · JPL
813291	2006 UO_{183}	—	October 12, 2006	Palomar	NEAT	H	500 m	MPC · JPL
813292	2006 UZ_{195}	—	October 16, 2006	Kitt Peak	Spacewatch	·	450 m	MPC · JPL
813293	2006 UC_{208}	—	October 23, 2006	Kitt Peak	Spacewatch	·	1.5 km	MPC · JPL
813294	2006 UD_{234}	—	September 26, 2006	Mount Lemmon	Mount Lemmon Survey	·	540 m	MPC · JPL
813295	2006 UD_{236}	—	October 23, 2006	Kitt Peak	Spacewatch	·	1.2 km	MPC · JPL
813296	2006 UC_{238}	—	October 23, 2006	Kitt Peak	Spacewatch	·	570 m	MPC · JPL
813297	2006 UC_{240}	—	September 27, 2006	Mount Lemmon	Mount Lemmon Survey	3:2 · SHU	4.0 km	MPC · JPL
813298	2006 UN_{245}	—	April 14, 2005	Kitt Peak	Spacewatch	·	1.2 km	MPC · JPL
813299	2006 UQ_{248}	—	October 27, 2006	Mount Lemmon	Mount Lemmon Survey	·	810 m	MPC · JPL
813300	2006 UD_{253}	—	October 27, 2006	Mount Lemmon	Mount Lemmon Survey	·	490 m	MPC · JPL

== 813301–813400 ==
back to top

Designation			Discovery			Properties		Ref
Permanent	Provisional	Named after	Date	Site	Discoverer(s)	Category	Diam.	Ref
813301	2006 UU_{255}	—	September 27, 2006	Mount Lemmon	Mount Lemmon Survey	·	900 m	MPC · JPL
813302	2006 UB_{258}	—	October 20, 2006	Kitt Peak	Spacewatch	KOR	1.0 km	MPC · JPL
813303	2006 UZ_{260}	—	October 20, 2006	Kitt Peak	Spacewatch	·	760 m	MPC · JPL
813304	2006 UB_{262}	—	October 28, 2006	Mount Lemmon	Mount Lemmon Survey	·	480 m	MPC · JPL
813305	2006 US_{290}	—	September 30, 2006	Mount Lemmon	Mount Lemmon Survey	·	1.4 km	MPC · JPL
813306	2006 UH_{317}	—	October 19, 2006	Kitt Peak	Deep Ecliptic Survey	·	1.2 km	MPC · JPL
813307	2006 UK_{317}	—	October 19, 2006	Kitt Peak	Deep Ecliptic Survey	·	1.7 km	MPC · JPL
813308	2006 UN_{346}	—	October 22, 2006	Kitt Peak	Spacewatch	H	390 m	MPC · JPL
813309	2006 UG_{347}	—	October 27, 2006	Mauna Kea	P. A. Wiegert	·	490 m	MPC · JPL
813310	2006 UF_{363}	—	October 16, 2006	Kitt Peak	Spacewatch	·	1.4 km	MPC · JPL
813311	2006 UE_{365}	—	October 23, 2006	Mount Lemmon	Mount Lemmon Survey	NYS	710 m	MPC · JPL
813312	2006 UP_{365}	—	October 28, 2006	Mount Lemmon	Mount Lemmon Survey	·	1.6 km	MPC · JPL
813313	2006 UX_{367}	—	October 22, 2006	Kitt Peak	Spacewatch	·	650 m	MPC · JPL
813314	2006 UC_{368}	—	October 16, 2006	Kitt Peak	Spacewatch	·	940 m	MPC · JPL
813315	2006 UK_{368}	—	October 20, 2006	Kitt Peak	Spacewatch	·	630 m	MPC · JPL
813316	2006 UE_{369}	—	August 2, 2016	Haleakala	Pan-STARRS 1	·	1.8 km	MPC · JPL
813317	2006 UG_{369}	—	August 30, 2016	Haleakala	Pan-STARRS 1	H	370 m	MPC · JPL
813318	2006 UJ_{369}	—	August 12, 2013	Haleakala	Pan-STARRS 1	·	1.1 km	MPC · JPL
813319	2006 UU_{373}	—	October 4, 2006	Mount Lemmon	Mount Lemmon Survey	·	520 m	MPC · JPL
813320	2006 UV_{373}	—	December 18, 2014	Haleakala	Pan-STARRS 1	H	310 m	MPC · JPL
813321	2006 UG_{374}	—	December 9, 2015	Haleakala	Pan-STARRS 1	·	1.3 km	MPC · JPL
813322	2006 UC_{375}	—	October 20, 2006	Kitt Peak	Spacewatch	·	470 m	MPC · JPL
813323	2006 UX_{375}	—	September 30, 2006	Mount Lemmon	Mount Lemmon Survey	·	450 m	MPC · JPL
813324	2006 UN_{377}	—	October 21, 2006	Sacramento Peak	SDSS Collaboration	·	540 m	MPC · JPL
813325	2006 UW_{377}	—	March 5, 2008	Mount Lemmon	Mount Lemmon Survey	·	620 m	MPC · JPL
813326	2006 UM_{378}	—	October 31, 2006	Mount Lemmon	Mount Lemmon Survey	·	1.5 km	MPC · JPL
813327	2006 UP_{380}	—	October 23, 2006	Mount Lemmon	Mount Lemmon Survey	(1338) (FLO)	420 m	MPC · JPL
813328	2006 UJ_{383}	—	October 23, 2006	Palomar	NEAT	·	640 m	MPC · JPL
813329	2006 UM_{384}	—	October 29, 2006	La Sagra	OAM	V	440 m	MPC · JPL
813330	2006 UV_{384}	—	October 21, 2006	Mount Lemmon	Mount Lemmon Survey	AGN	920 m	MPC · JPL
813331	2006 UW_{384}	—	November 11, 2006	Mount Lemmon	Mount Lemmon Survey	·	490 m	MPC · JPL
813332	2006 UX_{386}	—	October 20, 2006	Mount Lemmon	Mount Lemmon Survey	·	660 m	MPC · JPL
813333	2006 UA_{388}	—	October 17, 2006	Catalina	CSS	BAP	660 m	MPC · JPL
813334	2006 UR_{388}	—	October 22, 2006	Kitt Peak	Spacewatch	·	2.0 km	MPC · JPL
813335	2006 US_{389}	—	October 27, 2006	Kitt Peak	Spacewatch	·	620 m	MPC · JPL
813336	2006 UV_{389}	—	October 20, 2006	Mount Lemmon	Mount Lemmon Survey	EUP	2.6 km	MPC · JPL
813337	2006 UW_{391}	—	October 20, 2006	Kitt Peak	Spacewatch	·	1.4 km	MPC · JPL
813338	2006 VC_{6}	—	October 16, 2006	Catalina	CSS	PHO	720 m	MPC · JPL
813339	2006 VD_{15}	—	October 19, 2006	Kitt Peak	Spacewatch	·	440 m	MPC · JPL
813340	2006 VR_{17}	—	October 21, 2006	Kitt Peak	Spacewatch	EOS	1.2 km	MPC · JPL
813341	2006 VF_{23}	—	November 10, 2006	Kitt Peak	Spacewatch	·	520 m	MPC · JPL
813342	2006 VK_{32}	—	November 1, 2006	Kitt Peak	Spacewatch	·	1.6 km	MPC · JPL
813343	2006 VH_{38}	—	October 16, 2006	Kitt Peak	Spacewatch	MIS	2.0 km	MPC · JPL
813344	2006 VL_{58}	—	October 22, 2006	Mount Lemmon	Mount Lemmon Survey	MAS	440 m	MPC · JPL
813345	2006 VG_{70}	—	November 11, 2006	Kitt Peak	Spacewatch	·	690 m	MPC · JPL
813346	2006 VC_{83}	—	October 13, 2006	Kitt Peak	Spacewatch	·	630 m	MPC · JPL
813347	2006 VO_{95}	—	October 23, 2006	Mount Lemmon	Mount Lemmon Survey	H	290 m	MPC · JPL
813348	2006 VN_{99}	—	November 11, 2006	Mount Lemmon	Mount Lemmon Survey	TIR	2.2 km	MPC · JPL
813349	2006 VO_{113}	—	November 13, 2006	Mount Lemmon	Mount Lemmon Survey	·	3.2 km	MPC · JPL
813350	2006 VM_{114}	—	October 4, 2006	Mount Lemmon	Mount Lemmon Survey	·	490 m	MPC · JPL
813351	2006 VM_{118}	—	November 14, 2006	Kitt Peak	Spacewatch	·	640 m	MPC · JPL
813352	2006 VP_{134}	—	November 15, 2006	Catalina	CSS	(194)	1.2 km	MPC · JPL
813353	2006 VH_{143}	—	November 14, 2006	Kitt Peak	Spacewatch	TIR	2.2 km	MPC · JPL
813354	2006 VL_{171}	—	November 12, 2006	Mount Lemmon	Mount Lemmon Survey	H	500 m	MPC · JPL
813355	2006 VY_{175}	—	November 13, 2006	Catalina	CSS	PHO	750 m	MPC · JPL
813356	2006 VT_{178}	—	November 13, 2006	Mount Lemmon	Mount Lemmon Survey	H	320 m	MPC · JPL
813357	2006 VR_{181}	—	August 10, 2016	Haleakala	Pan-STARRS 1	·	1.3 km	MPC · JPL
813358	2006 VR_{185}	—	November 2, 2006	Bergisch Gladbach	W. Bickel	·	1.4 km	MPC · JPL
813359	2006 WH_{5}	—	November 16, 2006	Kitt Peak	Spacewatch	EOS	1.4 km	MPC · JPL
813360	2006 WJ_{30}	—	May 22, 2001	Cerro Tololo	Deep Ecliptic Survey	DOR	1.8 km	MPC · JPL
813361	2006 WT_{32}	—	November 16, 2006	Kitt Peak	Spacewatch	EOS	1.2 km	MPC · JPL
813362	2006 WX_{62}	—	October 17, 2006	Mount Lemmon	Mount Lemmon Survey	·	990 m	MPC · JPL
813363	2006 WM_{66}	—	November 17, 2006	Mount Lemmon	Mount Lemmon Survey	V	410 m	MPC · JPL
813364	2006 WT_{68}	—	November 17, 2006	Mount Lemmon	Mount Lemmon Survey	·	1.4 km	MPC · JPL
813365	2006 WO_{83}	—	November 18, 2006	Kitt Peak	Spacewatch	PHO	650 m	MPC · JPL
813366	2006 WT_{84}	—	November 18, 2006	Mount Lemmon	Mount Lemmon Survey	·	1.9 km	MPC · JPL
813367	2006 WU_{97}	—	November 19, 2006	Kitt Peak	Spacewatch	NYS	740 m	MPC · JPL
813368	2006 WQ_{100}	—	October 31, 2006	Kitt Peak	Spacewatch	·	560 m	MPC · JPL
813369	2006 WV_{105}	—	November 19, 2006	Kitt Peak	Spacewatch	EOS	1.2 km	MPC · JPL
813370	2006 WP_{113}	—	October 22, 2006	Mount Lemmon	Mount Lemmon Survey	·	1.9 km	MPC · JPL
813371	2006 WT_{125}	—	November 22, 2006	Mount Lemmon	Mount Lemmon Survey	·	980 m	MPC · JPL
813372	2006 WA_{140}	—	October 4, 2006	Mount Lemmon	Mount Lemmon Survey	BAR	880 m	MPC · JPL
813373	2006 WQ_{143}	—	November 20, 2006	Kitt Peak	Spacewatch	·	690 m	MPC · JPL
813374	2006 WE_{145}	—	November 20, 2006	Kitt Peak	Spacewatch	·	2.0 km	MPC · JPL
813375	2006 WB_{151}	—	November 20, 2006	Siding Spring	SSS	·	1.3 km	MPC · JPL
813376	2006 WQ_{169}	—	November 23, 2006	Mount Lemmon	Mount Lemmon Survey	·	930 m	MPC · JPL
813377	2006 WP_{203}	—	November 22, 2006	Kitt Peak	Spacewatch	·	520 m	MPC · JPL
813378	2006 WP_{207}	—	August 30, 2005	Kitt Peak	Spacewatch	3:2	3.9 km	MPC · JPL
813379	2006 WQ_{212}	—	October 23, 2013	Kitt Peak	Spacewatch	·	870 m	MPC · JPL
813380	2006 WZ_{212}	—	July 11, 2016	Haleakala	Pan-STARRS 1	·	550 m	MPC · JPL
813381	2006 WR_{213}	—	November 17, 2006	Kitt Peak	Spacewatch	·	3.1 km	MPC · JPL
813382	2006 WP_{215}	—	April 1, 2012	Mount Lemmon	Mount Lemmon Survey	·	570 m	MPC · JPL
813383	2006 WX_{215}	—	October 24, 2011	Haleakala	Pan-STARRS 1	·	1.6 km	MPC · JPL
813384	2006 WU_{216}	—	November 22, 2006	Mount Lemmon	Mount Lemmon Survey	·	520 m	MPC · JPL
813385	2006 WW_{216}	—	November 16, 2006	Kitt Peak	Spacewatch	·	2.2 km	MPC · JPL
813386	2006 WN_{218}	—	October 7, 2016	Haleakala	Pan-STARRS 1	·	540 m	MPC · JPL
813387	2006 WF_{220}	—	November 28, 2006	Kitt Peak	Spacewatch	·	620 m	MPC · JPL
813388	2006 WY_{224}	—	October 27, 2017	Haleakala	Pan-STARRS 1	·	820 m	MPC · JPL
813389	2006 WB_{226}	—	August 18, 2009	Kitt Peak	Spacewatch	·	560 m	MPC · JPL
813390	2006 WM_{227}	—	November 2, 2011	Mount Lemmon	Mount Lemmon Survey	EOS	1.4 km	MPC · JPL
813391	2006 WQ_{228}	—	November 25, 2006	Kitt Peak	Spacewatch	·	750 m	MPC · JPL
813392	2006 WW_{230}	—	November 16, 2006	Mount Lemmon	Mount Lemmon Survey	·	560 m	MPC · JPL
813393	2006 WZ_{231}	—	November 17, 2006	Kitt Peak	Spacewatch	·	1.0 km	MPC · JPL
813394	2006 WW_{233}	—	November 24, 2006	Kitt Peak	Spacewatch	H	410 m	MPC · JPL
813395	2006 WA_{234}	—	November 27, 2006	Mount Lemmon	Mount Lemmon Survey	·	2.3 km	MPC · JPL
813396	2006 WM_{235}	—	November 23, 2006	Mount Lemmon	Mount Lemmon Survey	EOS	1.4 km	MPC · JPL
813397	2006 WJ_{236}	—	November 17, 2006	Kitt Peak	Spacewatch	·	2.3 km	MPC · JPL
813398	2006 XQ_{11}	—	December 10, 2006	Kitt Peak	Spacewatch	·	1.2 km	MPC · JPL
813399	2006 XG_{22}	—	November 18, 2006	Mount Lemmon	Mount Lemmon Survey	·	570 m	MPC · JPL
813400	2006 XO_{39}	—	December 12, 2006	Kitt Peak	Spacewatch	MAS	510 m	MPC · JPL

== 813401–813500 ==
back to top

Designation			Discovery			Properties		Ref
Permanent	Provisional	Named after	Date	Site	Discoverer(s)	Category	Diam.	Ref
813401	2006 XL_{46}	—	December 13, 2006	Mount Lemmon	Mount Lemmon Survey	H	310 m	MPC · JPL
813402	2006 XC_{76}	—	October 17, 1995	Kitt Peak	Spacewatch	·	700 m	MPC · JPL
813403	2006 XV_{78}	—	December 11, 2014	Mount Lemmon	Mount Lemmon Survey	·	1.0 km	MPC · JPL
813404	2006 XF_{80}	—	December 13, 2006	Mount Lemmon	Mount Lemmon Survey	·	840 m	MPC · JPL
813405	2006 XG_{81}	—	December 9, 2006	Kitt Peak	Spacewatch	TIR	1.9 km	MPC · JPL
813406	2006 XW_{81}	—	December 13, 2006	Mount Lemmon	Mount Lemmon Survey	NYS	620 m	MPC · JPL
813407	2006 YC_{6}	—	December 17, 2006	Mount Lemmon	Mount Lemmon Survey	·	1.5 km	MPC · JPL
813408	2006 YD_{14}	—	December 22, 2006	Piszkéstető	K. Sárneczky, Szulágyi, J.	·	450 m	MPC · JPL
813409	2006 YG_{21}	—	December 9, 2006	Kitt Peak	Spacewatch	·	690 m	MPC · JPL
813410	2006 YN_{31}	—	December 1, 2006	Mount Lemmon	Mount Lemmon Survey	V	480 m	MPC · JPL
813411	2006 YT_{39}	—	December 22, 2006	Kitt Peak	Spacewatch	·	2.0 km	MPC · JPL
813412	2006 YV_{43}	—	December 15, 2006	Kitt Peak	Spacewatch	H	420 m	MPC · JPL
813413	2006 YE_{44}	—	December 13, 2006	Kitt Peak	Spacewatch	(2076)	690 m	MPC · JPL
813414	2006 YT_{47}	—	December 24, 2006	Kitt Peak	Spacewatch	·	600 m	MPC · JPL
813415	2006 YO_{57}	—	August 2, 2016	Haleakala	Pan-STARRS 1	·	1.6 km	MPC · JPL
813416	2006 YS_{59}	—	March 14, 2011	Mount Lemmon	Mount Lemmon Survey	·	650 m	MPC · JPL
813417	2006 YE_{61}	—	May 4, 2016	Kitt Peak	Spacewatch	EUN	840 m	MPC · JPL
813418	2006 YM_{63}	—	January 25, 2018	Mount Lemmon	Mount Lemmon Survey	H	390 m	MPC · JPL
813419	2006 YK_{66}	—	October 17, 2012	Mount Lemmon	Mount Lemmon Survey	·	580 m	MPC · JPL
813420	2006 YU_{68}	—	December 21, 2006	Kitt Peak	Spacewatch	·	720 m	MPC · JPL
813421	2006 YR_{69}	—	December 27, 2006	Mount Lemmon	Mount Lemmon Survey	MAS	510 m	MPC · JPL
813422	2006 YB_{70}	—	December 21, 2006	Kitt Peak	L. H. Wasserman, M. W. Buie	·	790 m	MPC · JPL
813423	2007 AF_{24}	—	December 15, 2006	Mount Lemmon	Mount Lemmon Survey	·	660 m	MPC · JPL
813424	2007 AZ_{31}	—	January 9, 2007	Mount Lemmon	Mount Lemmon Survey	·	800 m	MPC · JPL
813425	2007 AJ_{32}	—	January 10, 2007	Mount Lemmon	Mount Lemmon Survey	NYS	720 m	MPC · JPL
813426	2007 AA_{33}	—	January 15, 2007	Mauna Kea	P. A. Wiegert	·	1.0 km	MPC · JPL
813427	2007 AJ_{33}	—	December 11, 2013	Haleakala	Pan-STARRS 1	·	790 m	MPC · JPL
813428	2007 AR_{33}	—	January 15, 2007	Mauna Kea	P. A. Wiegert	·	1.0 km	MPC · JPL
813429	2007 AB_{38}	—	March 5, 2008	Mount Lemmon	Mount Lemmon Survey	(5)	840 m	MPC · JPL
813430	2007 AK_{38}	—	January 12, 2019	Haleakala	Pan-STARRS 1	EOS	1.4 km	MPC · JPL
813431	2007 BK_{34}	—	December 21, 2006	Mount Lemmon	Mount Lemmon Survey	THB	2.0 km	MPC · JPL
813432	2007 BM_{34}	—	January 9, 2007	Mount Lemmon	Mount Lemmon Survey	·	510 m	MPC · JPL
813433	2007 BV_{39}	—	January 9, 2007	Kitt Peak	Spacewatch	·	2.0 km	MPC · JPL
813434	2007 BB_{41}	—	December 27, 2006	Mount Lemmon	Mount Lemmon Survey	NYS	660 m	MPC · JPL
813435	2007 BO_{45}	—	December 21, 2006	Kitt Peak	L. H. Wasserman, M. W. Buie	·	610 m	MPC · JPL
813436	2007 BX_{51}	—	January 24, 2007	Kitt Peak	Spacewatch	·	510 m	MPC · JPL
813437	2007 BJ_{53}	—	December 21, 2006	Kitt Peak	L. H. Wasserman, M. W. Buie	·	970 m	MPC · JPL
813438	2007 BK_{53}	—	January 24, 2007	Kitt Peak	Spacewatch	·	710 m	MPC · JPL
813439	2007 BL_{54}	—	January 24, 2007	Kitt Peak	Spacewatch	AGN	850 m	MPC · JPL
813440	2007 BD_{55}	—	January 9, 2007	Mount Lemmon	Mount Lemmon Survey	·	640 m	MPC · JPL
813441	2007 BL_{67}	—	January 27, 2007	Mount Lemmon	Mount Lemmon Survey	·	930 m	MPC · JPL
813442	2007 BT_{86}	—	January 19, 2007	Mauna Kea	P. A. Wiegert	EOS	1.4 km	MPC · JPL
813443	2007 BM_{88}	—	January 19, 2007	Mauna Kea	P. A. Wiegert	·	1.9 km	MPC · JPL
813444	2007 BU_{89}	—	January 19, 2007	Mauna Kea	P. A. Wiegert	·	1.6 km	MPC · JPL
813445	2007 BK_{97}	—	December 21, 2006	Kitt Peak	L. H. Wasserman, M. W. Buie	HOF	1.6 km	MPC · JPL
813446	2007 BG_{104}	—	January 17, 2007	Kitt Peak	Spacewatch	NYS	840 m	MPC · JPL
813447	2007 BH_{105}	—	January 17, 2007	Kitt Peak	Spacewatch	·	2.3 km	MPC · JPL
813448	2007 BF_{106}	—	January 27, 2007	Kitt Peak	Spacewatch	·	2.2 km	MPC · JPL
813449	2007 BF_{107}	—	January 16, 2007	Mount Lemmon	Mount Lemmon Survey	NYS	780 m	MPC · JPL
813450	2007 BR_{107}	—	January 24, 2007	Kitt Peak	Spacewatch	·	2.2 km	MPC · JPL
813451	2007 BB_{112}	—	May 20, 2015	Mount Lemmon	Mount Lemmon Survey	·	780 m	MPC · JPL
813452	2007 BZ_{112}	—	August 9, 2005	Cerro Tololo	Deep Ecliptic Survey	·	760 m	MPC · JPL
813453	2007 BF_{115}	—	January 27, 2007	Kitt Peak	Spacewatch	·	580 m	MPC · JPL
813454	2007 BO_{116}	—	January 17, 2007	Kitt Peak	Spacewatch	·	1.7 km	MPC · JPL
813455	2007 BT_{118}	—	January 28, 2007	Mount Lemmon	Mount Lemmon Survey	·	2.2 km	MPC · JPL
813456	2007 BJ_{119}	—	January 28, 2007	Mount Lemmon	Mount Lemmon Survey	NYS	680 m	MPC · JPL
813457	2007 CR_{13}	—	February 7, 2007	Kitt Peak	Spacewatch	·	670 m	MPC · JPL
813458	2007 CZ_{23}	—	February 8, 2007	Palomar	NEAT	H	440 m	MPC · JPL
813459	2007 CK_{35}	—	January 17, 2007	Kitt Peak	Spacewatch	·	730 m	MPC · JPL
813460	2007 CY_{66}	—	February 14, 2007	Mauna Kea	P. A. Wiegert	·	940 m	MPC · JPL
813461	2007 CD_{67}	—	February 14, 2007	Mauna Kea	P. A. Wiegert	MAS	470 m	MPC · JPL
813462	2007 CY_{67}	—	February 14, 2007	Mauna Kea	P. A. Wiegert	·	850 m	MPC · JPL
813463	2007 CR_{78}	—	February 6, 2007	Mount Lemmon	Mount Lemmon Survey	·	520 m	MPC · JPL
813464	2007 CO_{81}	—	November 28, 2017	Mount Lemmon	Mount Lemmon Survey	PHO	760 m	MPC · JPL
813465	2007 CP_{81}	—	March 26, 2011	Kitt Peak	Spacewatch	MAS	540 m	MPC · JPL
813466	2007 CH_{82}	—	January 17, 2007	Kitt Peak	Spacewatch	·	1.1 km	MPC · JPL
813467	2007 CM_{82}	—	April 1, 2011	Kitt Peak	Spacewatch	NYS	710 m	MPC · JPL
813468	2007 CR_{82}	—	January 14, 2018	Mount Lemmon	Mount Lemmon Survey	NYS	820 m	MPC · JPL
813469	2007 CT_{82}	—	June 7, 2015	Mount Lemmon	Mount Lemmon Survey	MAS	510 m	MPC · JPL
813470	2007 CJ_{85}	—	February 7, 2007	Mount Lemmon	Mount Lemmon Survey	·	610 m	MPC · JPL
813471	2007 CM_{86}	—	February 6, 2007	Mount Lemmon	Mount Lemmon Survey	·	1.0 km	MPC · JPL
813472	2007 DP_{9}	—	February 17, 2007	Kitt Peak	Spacewatch	·	640 m	MPC · JPL
813473	2007 DE_{14}	—	February 17, 2007	Kitt Peak	Spacewatch	·	670 m	MPC · JPL
813474	2007 DR_{28}	—	February 17, 2007	Kitt Peak	Spacewatch	·	1.1 km	MPC · JPL
813475	2007 DB_{56}	—	November 21, 2003	Socorro	LINEAR	AMO	440 m	MPC · JPL
813476	2007 DY_{61}	—	February 21, 2007	Kitt Peak	Spacewatch	·	580 m	MPC · JPL
813477	2007 DR_{68}	—	February 21, 2007	Kitt Peak	Spacewatch	·	2.3 km	MPC · JPL
813478	2007 DW_{72}	—	February 21, 2007	Kitt Peak	Spacewatch	MAS	540 m	MPC · JPL
813479	2007 DG_{92}	—	January 28, 2007	Mount Lemmon	Mount Lemmon Survey	·	930 m	MPC · JPL
813480	2007 DP_{97}	—	February 23, 2007	Kitt Peak	Spacewatch	·	850 m	MPC · JPL
813481	2007 DK_{98}	—	February 25, 2007	Mount Lemmon	Mount Lemmon Survey	NYS	910 m	MPC · JPL
813482	2007 DM_{103}	—	February 25, 2007	Kitt Peak	Spacewatch	·	570 m	MPC · JPL
813483	2007 DC_{108}	—	February 22, 2007	Mount Graham	Trilling, D. E.	·	940 m	MPC · JPL
813484	2007 DC_{111}	—	February 23, 2007	Mount Lemmon	Mount Lemmon Survey	·	670 m	MPC · JPL
813485	2007 DM_{113}	—	February 21, 2007	Mount Lemmon	Mount Lemmon Survey	·	650 m	MPC · JPL
813486	2007 DJ_{118}	—	August 8, 2005	Cerro Tololo	Deep Ecliptic Survey	MAS	490 m	MPC · JPL
813487	2007 DJ_{119}	—	February 21, 2007	Mount Lemmon	Mount Lemmon Survey	·	610 m	MPC · JPL
813488	2007 DP_{119}	—	February 25, 2007	Mount Lemmon	Mount Lemmon Survey	MAS	540 m	MPC · JPL
813489	2007 DW_{120}	—	February 25, 2007	Kitt Peak	Spacewatch	NYS	840 m	MPC · JPL
813490	2007 DU_{121}	—	February 19, 2007	Mount Lemmon	Mount Lemmon Survey	·	2.0 km	MPC · JPL
813491	2007 DA_{122}	—	December 12, 2017	Haleakala	Pan-STARRS 1	·	2.0 km	MPC · JPL
813492	2007 DM_{122}	—	February 23, 2007	Mount Lemmon	Mount Lemmon Survey	NYS	650 m	MPC · JPL
813493	2007 DD_{123}	—	February 17, 2007	Mount Lemmon	Mount Lemmon Survey	·	1.0 km	MPC · JPL
813494	2007 DJ_{123}	—	February 16, 2007	Mount Lemmon	Mount Lemmon Survey	·	2.0 km	MPC · JPL
813495	2007 DL_{125}	—	March 26, 2011	Kitt Peak	Spacewatch	·	880 m	MPC · JPL
813496	2007 DU_{125}	—	January 5, 2014	Haleakala	Pan-STARRS 1	·	610 m	MPC · JPL
813497	2007 DJ_{126}	—	February 21, 2007	Mount Lemmon	Mount Lemmon Survey	·	450 m	MPC · JPL
813498	2007 DR_{126}	—	February 23, 2007	Mount Lemmon	Mount Lemmon Survey	·	500 m	MPC · JPL
813499	2007 DU_{129}	—	February 21, 2007	Mount Lemmon	Mount Lemmon Survey	MAS	560 m	MPC · JPL
813500	2007 DW_{129}	—	February 17, 2007	Kitt Peak	Spacewatch	·	690 m	MPC · JPL

== 813501–813600 ==
back to top

Designation			Discovery			Properties		Ref
Permanent	Provisional	Named after	Date	Site	Discoverer(s)	Category	Diam.	Ref
813501	2007 DR_{130}	—	February 26, 2007	Mount Lemmon	Mount Lemmon Survey	·	750 m	MPC · JPL
813502	2007 DW_{130}	—	February 17, 2007	Mount Lemmon	Mount Lemmon Survey	·	470 m	MPC · JPL
813503	2007 DY_{132}	—	February 21, 2007	Kitt Peak	Spacewatch	THM	1.5 km	MPC · JPL
813504	2007 EY_{15}	—	February 21, 2007	Mount Lemmon	Mount Lemmon Survey	EUN	770 m	MPC · JPL
813505	2007 ET_{17}	—	February 23, 2007	Mount Lemmon	Mount Lemmon Survey	·	1.2 km	MPC · JPL
813506	2007 EM_{20}	—	March 10, 2007	Mount Lemmon	Mount Lemmon Survey	JUN	790 m	MPC · JPL
813507	2007 ES_{21}	—	March 10, 2007	Kitt Peak	Spacewatch	MAS	530 m	MPC · JPL
813508	2007 EN_{22}	—	February 25, 2007	Kitt Peak	Spacewatch	·	560 m	MPC · JPL
813509	2007 EA_{29}	—	March 9, 2007	Mount Lemmon	Mount Lemmon Survey	·	490 m	MPC · JPL
813510	2007 ET_{41}	—	February 10, 2000	Kitt Peak	Spacewatch	·	540 m	MPC · JPL
813511	2007 EN_{49}	—	March 10, 2007	Mount Lemmon	Mount Lemmon Survey	·	780 m	MPC · JPL
813512	2007 EX_{58}	—	February 23, 2007	Mount Lemmon	Mount Lemmon Survey	THM	1.8 km	MPC · JPL
813513	2007 EF_{60}	—	February 25, 2007	Mount Lemmon	Mount Lemmon Survey	·	750 m	MPC · JPL
813514	2007 EQ_{60}	—	February 21, 2007	Kitt Peak	Spacewatch	·	1.2 km	MPC · JPL
813515	2007 ED_{61}	—	March 10, 2007	Kitt Peak	Spacewatch	H	350 m	MPC · JPL
813516	2007 ET_{70}	—	March 10, 2007	Kitt Peak	Spacewatch	NYS	3.4 km	MPC · JPL
813517	2007 EL_{78}	—	March 10, 2007	Mount Lemmon	Mount Lemmon Survey	·	750 m	MPC · JPL
813518	2007 EK_{79}	—	March 10, 2007	Kitt Peak	Spacewatch	·	720 m	MPC · JPL
813519	2007 EU_{91}	—	January 28, 2007	Mount Lemmon	Mount Lemmon Survey	·	560 m	MPC · JPL
813520	2007 EC_{94}	—	February 21, 2007	Kitt Peak	Spacewatch	·	460 m	MPC · JPL
813521	2007 EH_{98}	—	March 11, 2007	Kitt Peak	Spacewatch	·	660 m	MPC · JPL
813522	2007 EM_{99}	—	March 11, 2007	Kitt Peak	Spacewatch	MAS	510 m	MPC · JPL
813523	2007 ES_{103}	—	March 11, 2007	Mount Lemmon	Mount Lemmon Survey	NYS	1.0 km	MPC · JPL
813524	2007 EE_{108}	—	March 11, 2007	Kitt Peak	Spacewatch	·	780 m	MPC · JPL
813525	2007 EE_{111}	—	March 11, 2007	Kitt Peak	Spacewatch	·	900 m	MPC · JPL
813526	2007 EZ_{113}	—	March 12, 2007	Mount Lemmon	Mount Lemmon Survey	·	1.1 km	MPC · JPL
813527	2007 EX_{116}	—	March 13, 2007	Mount Lemmon	Mount Lemmon Survey	·	900 m	MPC · JPL
813528	2007 EC_{118}	—	March 13, 2007	Mount Lemmon	Mount Lemmon Survey	·	1 km	MPC · JPL
813529	2007 EB_{119}	—	March 13, 2007	Mount Lemmon	Mount Lemmon Survey	MAS	550 m	MPC · JPL
813530	2007 EE_{124}	—	March 14, 2007	Mount Lemmon	Mount Lemmon Survey	·	710 m	MPC · JPL
813531	2007 EK_{124}	—	March 14, 2007	Kitt Peak	Spacewatch	·	530 m	MPC · JPL
813532	2007 EA_{125}	—	March 14, 2007	Mount Lemmon	Mount Lemmon Survey	H	400 m	MPC · JPL
813533	2007 EW_{128}	—	March 9, 2007	Mount Lemmon	Mount Lemmon Survey	MAS	500 m	MPC · JPL
813534	2007 EE_{142}	—	March 12, 2007	Kitt Peak	Spacewatch	·	600 m	MPC · JPL
813535	2007 EH_{152}	—	March 12, 2007	Mount Lemmon	Mount Lemmon Survey	·	820 m	MPC · JPL
813536	2007 EA_{156}	—	March 12, 2007	Kitt Peak	Spacewatch	·	800 m	MPC · JPL
813537	2007 EE_{168}	—	March 13, 2007	Kitt Peak	Spacewatch	MAS	570 m	MPC · JPL
813538	2007 EQ_{170}	—	January 27, 2007	Kitt Peak	Spacewatch	MAS	550 m	MPC · JPL
813539	2007 ER_{174}	—	March 14, 2007	Kitt Peak	Spacewatch	·	860 m	MPC · JPL
813540	2007 EX_{175}	—	March 14, 2007	Kitt Peak	Spacewatch	·	680 m	MPC · JPL
813541	2007 ET_{183}	—	March 12, 2007	Mount Lemmon	Mount Lemmon Survey	MAS	460 m	MPC · JPL
813542	2007 EV_{185}	—	March 15, 2007	Mount Lemmon	Mount Lemmon Survey	NYS	720 m	MPC · JPL
813543	2007 EO_{188}	—	March 13, 2007	Mount Lemmon	Mount Lemmon Survey	·	2.2 km	MPC · JPL
813544	2007 EZ_{221}	—	February 21, 2007	Kitt Peak	Spacewatch	NYS	950 m	MPC · JPL
813545	2007 EK_{226}	—	March 14, 2007	Kitt Peak	Spacewatch	MAS	530 m	MPC · JPL
813546	2007 EU_{226}	—	March 10, 2007	Mount Lemmon	Mount Lemmon Survey	·	500 m	MPC · JPL
813547	2007 EE_{227}	—	March 14, 2007	Mount Lemmon	Mount Lemmon Survey	ERI	1.1 km	MPC · JPL
813548	2007 EG_{227}	—	March 14, 2007	Kitt Peak	Spacewatch	·	970 m	MPC · JPL
813549	2007 EK_{228}	—	March 15, 2007	Kitt Peak	Spacewatch	·	1.1 km	MPC · JPL
813550	2007 EW_{228}	—	March 13, 2007	Kitt Peak	Spacewatch	MAS	520 m	MPC · JPL
813551	2007 EM_{229}	—	March 9, 2007	Kitt Peak	Spacewatch	·	790 m	MPC · JPL
813552	2007 EX_{229}	—	January 17, 2015	Haleakala	Pan-STARRS 1	·	800 m	MPC · JPL
813553	2007 EW_{230}	—	February 12, 2011	Kitt Peak	Spacewatch	·	1.2 km	MPC · JPL
813554	2007 EF_{232}	—	January 2, 2014	Kitt Peak	Spacewatch	·	830 m	MPC · JPL
813555	2007 EO_{232}	—	March 15, 2007	Kitt Peak	Spacewatch	·	900 m	MPC · JPL
813556	2007 ED_{234}	—	April 2, 2011	Kitt Peak	Spacewatch	·	990 m	MPC · JPL
813557	2007 EL_{234}	—	March 18, 2018	Haleakala	Pan-STARRS 1	·	820 m	MPC · JPL
813558	2007 ET_{234}	—	February 27, 2014	Haleakala	Pan-STARRS 1	·	710 m	MPC · JPL
813559	2007 EF_{235}	—	October 18, 2008	Kitt Peak	Spacewatch	·	810 m	MPC · JPL
813560	2007 EL_{236}	—	February 16, 2015	Haleakala	Pan-STARRS 1	MAR	690 m	MPC · JPL
813561	2007 ER_{236}	—	March 11, 2007	Mount Lemmon	Mount Lemmon Survey	·	640 m	MPC · JPL
813562	2007 EU_{237}	—	July 27, 2014	ESA OGS	ESA OGS	THM	1.9 km	MPC · JPL
813563	2007 EX_{238}	—	March 15, 2007	Kitt Peak	Spacewatch	·	940 m	MPC · JPL
813564	2007 EM_{239}	—	March 15, 2007	Kitt Peak	Spacewatch	NYS	810 m	MPC · JPL
813565	2007 ER_{240}	—	March 13, 2007	Mount Lemmon	Mount Lemmon Survey	·	900 m	MPC · JPL
813566	2007 EC_{241}	—	March 10, 2007	Mount Lemmon	Mount Lemmon Survey	·	760 m	MPC · JPL
813567	2007 EE_{241}	—	March 10, 2007	Mount Lemmon	Mount Lemmon Survey	·	440 m	MPC · JPL
813568	2007 EW_{242}	—	March 14, 2007	Mount Lemmon	Mount Lemmon Survey	·	800 m	MPC · JPL
813569	2007 FK_{36}	—	March 26, 2007	Mount Lemmon	Mount Lemmon Survey	·	1.4 km	MPC · JPL
813570	2007 FS_{41}	—	March 26, 2007	Mount Lemmon	Mount Lemmon Survey	MAR	750 m	MPC · JPL
813571	2007 FD_{54}	—	March 26, 2007	Mount Lemmon	Mount Lemmon Survey	·	780 m	MPC · JPL
813572	2007 FH_{54}	—	October 15, 2012	Haleakala	Pan-STARRS 1	V	480 m	MPC · JPL
813573	2007 FL_{54}	—	September 6, 2008	Mount Lemmon	Mount Lemmon Survey	·	760 m	MPC · JPL
813574	2007 FS_{54}	—	March 16, 2007	Mount Lemmon	Mount Lemmon Survey	V	490 m	MPC · JPL
813575	2007 FB_{55}	—	November 8, 2009	Kitt Peak	Spacewatch	·	600 m	MPC · JPL
813576	2007 FM_{56}	—	May 18, 2015	Haleakala	Pan-STARRS 1	NYS	860 m	MPC · JPL
813577	2007 FN_{56}	—	March 25, 2007	Mount Lemmon	Mount Lemmon Survey	·	840 m	MPC · JPL
813578	2007 FV_{56}	—	October 15, 2012	Mount Lemmon	Mount Lemmon Survey	·	650 m	MPC · JPL
813579	2007 FL_{58}	—	March 18, 2007	Kitt Peak	Spacewatch	·	800 m	MPC · JPL
813580	2007 FC_{59}	—	November 6, 2012	Kitt Peak	Spacewatch	·	470 m	MPC · JPL
813581	2007 FM_{60}	—	March 26, 2007	Kitt Peak	Spacewatch	NYS	900 m	MPC · JPL
813582	2007 FT_{60}	—	March 26, 2007	Mount Lemmon	Mount Lemmon Survey	H	310 m	MPC · JPL
813583	2007 FW_{62}	—	March 16, 2007	Mount Lemmon	Mount Lemmon Survey	·	860 m	MPC · JPL
813584	2007 FA_{64}	—	March 16, 2007	Mount Lemmon	Mount Lemmon Survey	·	670 m	MPC · JPL
813585	2007 GD_{3}	—	March 26, 2007	Mount Lemmon	Mount Lemmon Survey	·	750 m	MPC · JPL
813586	2007 GW_{7}	—	March 13, 2007	Kitt Peak	Spacewatch	·	890 m	MPC · JPL
813587	2007 GO_{18}	—	April 11, 2007	Kitt Peak	Spacewatch	PHO	650 m	MPC · JPL
813588	2007 GZ_{20}	—	April 11, 2007	Mount Lemmon	Mount Lemmon Survey	·	680 m	MPC · JPL
813589	2007 GO_{28}	—	April 15, 2007	Kitt Peak	Spacewatch	·	1 km	MPC · JPL
813590	2007 GM_{30}	—	March 26, 2007	Mount Lemmon	Mount Lemmon Survey	·	880 m	MPC · JPL
813591	2007 GJ_{34}	—	April 14, 2007	Kitt Peak	Spacewatch	·	950 m	MPC · JPL
813592	2007 GR_{41}	—	March 15, 2007	Mount Lemmon	Mount Lemmon Survey	·	750 m	MPC · JPL
813593	2007 GL_{46}	—	April 14, 2007	Kitt Peak	Spacewatch	NYS	920 m	MPC · JPL
813594	2007 GK_{49}	—	April 15, 2007	Kitt Peak	Spacewatch	·	900 m	MPC · JPL
813595	2007 GZ_{58}	—	March 9, 2007	Mount Lemmon	Mount Lemmon Survey	·	770 m	MPC · JPL
813596	2007 GL_{65}	—	April 15, 2007	Kitt Peak	Spacewatch	MAS	530 m	MPC · JPL
813597	2007 GS_{71}	—	October 11, 2001	Palomar	NEAT	·	1.3 km	MPC · JPL
813598	2007 GT_{79}	—	April 7, 2007	Mount Lemmon	Mount Lemmon Survey	·	740 m	MPC · JPL
813599	2007 GV_{79}	—	April 14, 2007	Kitt Peak	Spacewatch	·	770 m	MPC · JPL
813600	2007 GB_{80}	—	May 11, 2016	Mount Lemmon	Mount Lemmon Survey	·	1.3 km	MPC · JPL

== 813601–813700 ==
back to top

Designation			Discovery			Properties		Ref
Permanent	Provisional	Named after	Date	Site	Discoverer(s)	Category	Diam.	Ref
813601	2007 GE_{80}	—	May 18, 2018	Mount Lemmon	Mount Lemmon Survey	·	850 m	MPC · JPL
813602	2007 GE_{81}	—	April 11, 2007	Kitt Peak	Spacewatch	NYS	860 m	MPC · JPL
813603	2007 GL_{82}	—	April 15, 2007	Mount Lemmon	Mount Lemmon Survey	H	400 m	MPC · JPL
813604	2007 HM_{27}	—	April 18, 2007	Kitt Peak	Spacewatch	·	760 m	MPC · JPL
813605	2007 HB_{31}	—	March 13, 2007	Kitt Peak	Spacewatch	·	670 m	MPC · JPL
813606	2007 HV_{31}	—	April 19, 2007	Kitt Peak	Spacewatch	PHO	760 m	MPC · JPL
813607	2007 HB_{42}	—	April 22, 2007	Mount Lemmon	Mount Lemmon Survey	·	860 m	MPC · JPL
813608	2007 HT_{48}	—	April 20, 2007	Kitt Peak	Spacewatch	·	910 m	MPC · JPL
813609	2007 HH_{52}	—	April 20, 2007	Kitt Peak	Spacewatch	·	940 m	MPC · JPL
813610	2007 HC_{58}	—	April 23, 2007	Kitt Peak	Spacewatch	·	870 m	MPC · JPL
813611	2007 HP_{62}	—	April 22, 2007	Mount Lemmon	Mount Lemmon Survey	·	650 m	MPC · JPL
813612	2007 HR_{67}	—	April 23, 2007	Kitt Peak	Spacewatch	·	830 m	MPC · JPL
813613	2007 HU_{99}	—	April 16, 2007	Mount Lemmon	Mount Lemmon Survey	·	740 m	MPC · JPL
813614	2007 HD_{100}	—	April 22, 2007	Mount Lemmon	Mount Lemmon Survey	·	750 m	MPC · JPL
813615	2007 HU_{103}	—	April 19, 2007	Kitt Peak	Spacewatch	MAS	480 m	MPC · JPL
813616	2007 HA_{104}	—	May 11, 2007	Mount Lemmon	Mount Lemmon Survey	H	350 m	MPC · JPL
813617	2007 HP_{104}	—	December 19, 2014	Haleakala	Pan-STARRS 1	H	470 m	MPC · JPL
813618	2007 HN_{106}	—	March 22, 2015	Kitt Peak	Spacewatch	·	750 m	MPC · JPL
813619	2007 HC_{109}	—	February 1, 2012	Mount Lemmon	Mount Lemmon Survey	·	1.4 km	MPC · JPL
813620	2007 HT_{109}	—	November 18, 2016	Mount Lemmon	Mount Lemmon Survey	·	990 m	MPC · JPL
813621	2007 HU_{114}	—	April 19, 2007	Mount Lemmon	Mount Lemmon Survey	NYS	810 m	MPC · JPL
813622	2007 HB_{115}	—	April 23, 2007	Mount Lemmon	Mount Lemmon Survey	·	1.4 km	MPC · JPL
813623	2007 HY_{115}	—	April 19, 2007	Kitt Peak	Spacewatch	·	800 m	MPC · JPL
813624	2007 HN_{116}	—	April 19, 2007	Mount Lemmon	Mount Lemmon Survey	NYS	760 m	MPC · JPL
813625	2007 JP_{5}	—	March 26, 2007	Mount Lemmon	Mount Lemmon Survey	·	2.4 km	MPC · JPL
813626	2007 JM_{6}	—	May 9, 2007	Mount Lemmon	Mount Lemmon Survey	MAS	510 m	MPC · JPL
813627	2007 JR_{6}	—	April 19, 2007	Kitt Peak	Spacewatch	·	570 m	MPC · JPL
813628	2007 JQ_{13}	—	March 30, 2003	Kitt Peak	Deep Ecliptic Survey	·	910 m	MPC · JPL
813629	2007 JE_{15}	—	May 10, 2007	Mount Lemmon	Mount Lemmon Survey	·	2.1 km	MPC · JPL
813630	2007 JD_{33}	—	April 25, 2007	Kitt Peak	Spacewatch	·	720 m	MPC · JPL
813631	2007 JY_{44}	—	May 10, 2007	Mount Lemmon	Mount Lemmon Survey	MAS	560 m	MPC · JPL
813632	2007 JS_{48}	—	June 23, 2011	Kitt Peak	Spacewatch	·	660 m	MPC · JPL
813633	2007 JA_{52}	—	May 13, 2007	Mount Lemmon	Mount Lemmon Survey	·	690 m	MPC · JPL
813634	2007 KH_{2}	—	May 18, 2007	Charleston	R. Holmes	EUN	800 m	MPC · JPL
813635	2007 KT_{4}	—	May 24, 2007	Kitt Peak	Spacewatch	·	750 m	MPC · JPL
813636	2007 KP_{6}	—	May 25, 2007	Mount Lemmon	Mount Lemmon Survey	H	360 m	MPC · JPL
813637	2007 KC_{7}	—	May 25, 2007	Mount Lemmon	Mount Lemmon Survey	·	1.3 km	MPC · JPL
813638	2007 KV_{9}	—	May 25, 2007	Mount Lemmon	Mount Lemmon Survey	·	780 m	MPC · JPL
813639	2007 KY_{10}	—	May 25, 2007	Mount Lemmon	Mount Lemmon Survey	·	880 m	MPC · JPL
813640	2007 KN_{11}	—	October 22, 2012	Haleakala	Pan-STARRS 1	V	520 m	MPC · JPL
813641	2007 KB_{12}	—	May 26, 2007	Mount Lemmon	Mount Lemmon Survey	MAS	560 m	MPC · JPL
813642	2007 LS_{2}	—	June 8, 2007	Kitt Peak	Spacewatch	H	410 m	MPC · JPL
813643	2007 LG_{13}	—	June 10, 2007	Kitt Peak	Spacewatch	·	600 m	MPC · JPL
813644	2007 LG_{22}	—	April 24, 2007	Mount Lemmon	Mount Lemmon Survey	·	770 m	MPC · JPL
813645	2007 LB_{33}	—	June 15, 2007	Socorro	LINEAR	·	1.2 km	MPC · JPL
813646	2007 LF_{37}	—	April 24, 2007	Mount Lemmon	Mount Lemmon Survey	·	1.3 km	MPC · JPL
813647	2007 LK_{39}	—	December 3, 2013	Haleakala	Pan-STARRS 1	H	330 m	MPC · JPL
813648	2007 MF_{6}	—	June 18, 2007	Kitt Peak	Spacewatch	·	620 m	MPC · JPL
813649	2007 MJ_{10}	—	June 21, 2007	Mount Lemmon	Mount Lemmon Survey	·	710 m	MPC · JPL
813650	2007 MB_{14}	—	June 20, 2007	Kitt Peak	Spacewatch	·	2.5 km	MPC · JPL
813651	2007 MW_{16}	—	April 25, 2007	Mount Lemmon	Mount Lemmon Survey	ADE	1.5 km	MPC · JPL
813652	2007 MR_{28}	—	April 15, 2016	Haleakala	Pan-STARRS 1	·	1.5 km	MPC · JPL
813653	2007 MS_{28}	—	February 15, 2010	Mount Lemmon	Mount Lemmon Survey	NYS	870 m	MPC · JPL
813654	2007 MG_{29}	—	May 12, 2007	Lulin	LUSS	NYS	1.0 km	MPC · JPL
813655	2007 ML_{29}	—	April 4, 2014	Haleakala	Pan-STARRS 1	·	790 m	MPC · JPL
813656	2007 MR_{29}	—	September 12, 2015	Haleakala	Pan-STARRS 1	NYS	930 m	MPC · JPL
813657	2007 NG_{2}	—	July 13, 2007	Punaʻauia	Teamo, N.	·	1.0 km	MPC · JPL
813658	2007 OB_{12}	—	July 18, 2007	Mount Lemmon	Mount Lemmon Survey	·	540 m	MPC · JPL
813659	2007 PH_{19}	—	August 9, 2007	Socorro	LINEAR	·	1.3 km	MPC · JPL
813660	2007 PG_{30}	—	August 11, 2007	Socorro	LINEAR	TIN	920 m	MPC · JPL
813661	2007 PW_{35}	—	August 12, 2007	Socorro	LINEAR	·	1.4 km	MPC · JPL
813662	2007 PF_{51}	—	August 13, 2007	Siding Spring	SSS	PHO	840 m	MPC · JPL
813663	2007 PQ_{53}	—	August 12, 2007	Siding Spring	SSS	·	1.1 km	MPC · JPL
813664	2007 PR_{54}	—	August 10, 2007	Kitt Peak	Spacewatch	·	820 m	MPC · JPL
813665	2007 QR_{13}	—	August 24, 2007	Kitt Peak	Spacewatch	·	490 m	MPC · JPL
813666	2007 QJ_{14}	—	August 21, 2007	Anderson Mesa	LONEOS	·	1.1 km	MPC · JPL
813667	2007 QO_{17}	—	August 24, 2007	Kitt Peak	Spacewatch	NYS	930 m	MPC · JPL
813668	2007 QE_{19}	—	August 24, 2007	Kitt Peak	Spacewatch	·	1.4 km	MPC · JPL
813669	2007 RK_{4}	—	January 5, 2006	Mount Lemmon	Mount Lemmon Survey	H	360 m	MPC · JPL
813670	2007 RY_{28}	—	December 3, 2005	Mauna Kea	A. Boattini	MAS	560 m	MPC · JPL
813671	2007 RL_{48}	—	September 9, 2007	Mount Lemmon	Mount Lemmon Survey	H	420 m	MPC · JPL
813672	2007 RX_{48}	—	September 9, 2007	Mount Lemmon	Mount Lemmon Survey	V	430 m	MPC · JPL
813673	2007 RH_{49}	—	September 9, 2007	Mount Lemmon	Mount Lemmon Survey	MAS	560 m	MPC · JPL
813674	2007 RC_{54}	—	September 9, 2007	Kitt Peak	Spacewatch	·	470 m	MPC · JPL
813675	2007 RY_{56}	—	September 9, 2007	Kitt Peak	Spacewatch	·	1.9 km	MPC · JPL
813676	2007 RY_{60}	—	September 10, 2007	Mount Lemmon	Mount Lemmon Survey	·	600 m	MPC · JPL
813677	2007 RO_{63}	—	September 10, 2007	Mount Lemmon	Mount Lemmon Survey	·	920 m	MPC · JPL
813678	2007 RY_{65}	—	August 10, 2007	Kitt Peak	Spacewatch	·	820 m	MPC · JPL
813679	2007 RQ_{67}	—	August 9, 2007	Kitt Peak	Spacewatch	·	690 m	MPC · JPL
813680	2007 RU_{70}	—	September 10, 2007	Kitt Peak	Spacewatch	·	850 m	MPC · JPL
813681	2007 RU_{84}	—	September 10, 2007	Mount Lemmon	Mount Lemmon Survey	·	830 m	MPC · JPL
813682	2007 RA_{93}	—	September 10, 2007	Catalina	CSS	·	2.3 km	MPC · JPL
813683	2007 RT_{106}	—	July 18, 2007	Mount Lemmon	Mount Lemmon Survey	NYS	1.0 km	MPC · JPL
813684	2007 RY_{108}	—	September 11, 2007	Kitt Peak	Spacewatch	·	420 m	MPC · JPL
813685	2007 RD_{115}	—	September 11, 2007	Kitt Peak	Spacewatch	H	340 m	MPC · JPL
813686	2007 RZ_{120}	—	August 23, 2007	Kitt Peak	Spacewatch	TIR	2.4 km	MPC · JPL
813687	2007 RQ_{127}	—	September 12, 2007	Mount Lemmon	Mount Lemmon Survey	NYS	760 m	MPC · JPL
813688 Fongfeifei	2007 RL_{138}	Fongfeifei	September 14, 2007	Lulin	LUSS	·	970 m	MPC · JPL
813689	2007 RH_{151}	—	September 10, 2007	Kitt Peak	Spacewatch	·	740 m	MPC · JPL
813690	2007 RA_{153}	—	September 10, 2007	Kitt Peak	Spacewatch	·	820 m	MPC · JPL
813691	2007 RJ_{155}	—	September 10, 2007	Mount Lemmon	Mount Lemmon Survey	MAS	430 m	MPC · JPL
813692	2007 RO_{162}	—	September 10, 2007	Kitt Peak	Spacewatch	·	460 m	MPC · JPL
813693	2007 RL_{167}	—	August 24, 2007	Kitt Peak	Spacewatch	·	930 m	MPC · JPL
813694	2007 RN_{167}	—	July 18, 2007	Mount Lemmon	Mount Lemmon Survey	·	1.3 km	MPC · JPL
813695	2007 RC_{172}	—	September 10, 2007	Kitt Peak	Spacewatch	NYS	920 m	MPC · JPL
813696	2007 RU_{177}	—	September 10, 2007	Kitt Peak	Spacewatch	·	920 m	MPC · JPL
813697	2007 RW_{180}	—	September 11, 2007	Mount Lemmon	Mount Lemmon Survey	·	900 m	MPC · JPL
813698	2007 RO_{182}	—	September 12, 2007	Mount Lemmon	Mount Lemmon Survey	·	430 m	MPC · JPL
813699	2007 RB_{183}	—	September 12, 2007	Mount Lemmon	Mount Lemmon Survey	·	820 m	MPC · JPL
813700	2007 RP_{189}	—	September 10, 2007	Kitt Peak	Spacewatch	·	1.9 km	MPC · JPL

== 813701–813800 ==
back to top

Designation			Discovery			Properties		Ref
Permanent	Provisional	Named after	Date	Site	Discoverer(s)	Category	Diam.	Ref
813701	2007 RY_{215}	—	September 12, 2007	Kitt Peak	Spacewatch	(2076)	610 m	MPC · JPL
813702	2007 RH_{234}	—	May 11, 2003	Kitt Peak	Spacewatch	·	880 m	MPC · JPL
813703	2007 RA_{236}	—	September 12, 2007	Mount Lemmon	Mount Lemmon Survey	·	1.2 km	MPC · JPL
813704	2007 RB_{248}	—	September 13, 2007	Mount Lemmon	Mount Lemmon Survey	·	520 m	MPC · JPL
813705	2007 RN_{259}	—	September 14, 2007	Mount Lemmon	Mount Lemmon Survey	·	1.0 km	MPC · JPL
813706	2007 RY_{261}	—	September 14, 2007	Kitt Peak	Spacewatch	·	650 m	MPC · JPL
813707	2007 RJ_{268}	—	September 15, 2007	Kitt Peak	Spacewatch	NYS	760 m	MPC · JPL
813708	2007 RW_{295}	—	September 15, 2007	Kitt Peak	Spacewatch	·	1.5 km	MPC · JPL
813709	2007 RC_{297}	—	September 10, 2007	Kitt Peak	Spacewatch	NYS	890 m	MPC · JPL
813710	2007 RE_{297}	—	September 10, 2007	Kitt Peak	Spacewatch	·	1.0 km	MPC · JPL
813711	2007 RT_{301}	—	September 14, 2007	Mount Lemmon	Mount Lemmon Survey	·	1.4 km	MPC · JPL
813712	2007 RO_{302}	—	September 9, 2007	Mount Lemmon	Mount Lemmon Survey	PHO	680 m	MPC · JPL
813713	2007 RD_{304}	—	September 14, 2007	Mauna Kea	P. A. Wiegert	·	1.5 km	MPC · JPL
813714	2007 RJ_{313}	—	September 6, 2007	Anderson Mesa	LONEOS	·	2.0 km	MPC · JPL
813715	2007 RN_{315}	—	September 11, 2007	Catalina	CSS	·	1.8 km	MPC · JPL
813716	2007 RV_{316}	—	September 9, 2007	Kitt Peak	Spacewatch	(2076)	580 m	MPC · JPL
813717	2007 RG_{317}	—	September 10, 2007	Mount Lemmon	Mount Lemmon Survey	·	1.2 km	MPC · JPL
813718	2007 RG_{324}	—	September 14, 2007	Mount Lemmon	Mount Lemmon Survey	·	1.2 km	MPC · JPL
813719	2007 RR_{330}	—	September 12, 2007	Catalina	CSS	·	910 m	MPC · JPL
813720	2007 RX_{331}	—	September 13, 2007	Mount Lemmon	Mount Lemmon Survey	·	1.1 km	MPC · JPL
813721	2007 RF_{332}	—	September 14, 2007	Mount Lemmon	Mount Lemmon Survey	NYS	850 m	MPC · JPL
813722	2007 RW_{332}	—	September 15, 2007	Mount Lemmon	Mount Lemmon Survey	·	1.4 km	MPC · JPL
813723	2007 RA_{337}	—	June 4, 2011	Mount Lemmon	Mount Lemmon Survey	·	1.3 km	MPC · JPL
813724	2007 RU_{338}	—	September 3, 2007	Catalina	CSS	·	970 m	MPC · JPL
813725	2007 RT_{340}	—	September 13, 2007	Kitt Peak	Spacewatch	·	720 m	MPC · JPL
813726	2007 RR_{342}	—	September 14, 2007	Mount Lemmon	Mount Lemmon Survey	·	930 m	MPC · JPL
813727	2007 RH_{344}	—	September 10, 2007	Kitt Peak	Spacewatch	·	500 m	MPC · JPL
813728	2007 RO_{344}	—	September 10, 2007	Mount Lemmon	Mount Lemmon Survey	·	850 m	MPC · JPL
813729	2007 RY_{344}	—	September 11, 2007	Catalina	CSS	·	590 m	MPC · JPL
813730	2007 RV_{345}	—	September 15, 2007	Mount Lemmon	Mount Lemmon Survey	NYS	810 m	MPC · JPL
813731	2007 RT_{347}	—	July 19, 2018	Haleakala	Pan-STARRS 2	CLA	1.2 km	MPC · JPL
813732	2007 RF_{352}	—	April 29, 2011	Mount Lemmon	Mount Lemmon Survey	·	1.4 km	MPC · JPL
813733	2007 RG_{354}	—	September 13, 2007	Mount Lemmon	Mount Lemmon Survey	NYS	700 m	MPC · JPL
813734	2007 RC_{355}	—	September 13, 2007	Mount Lemmon	Mount Lemmon Survey	·	660 m	MPC · JPL
813735	2007 RW_{356}	—	September 13, 2007	Kitt Peak	Spacewatch	·	470 m	MPC · JPL
813736	2007 RH_{357}	—	September 12, 2007	Mount Lemmon	Mount Lemmon Survey	·	1.5 km	MPC · JPL
813737	2007 RH_{358}	—	September 13, 2007	Kitt Peak	Spacewatch	·	550 m	MPC · JPL
813738	2007 RY_{359}	—	October 4, 1996	Kitt Peak	Spacewatch	·	800 m	MPC · JPL
813739	2007 RG_{361}	—	September 13, 2007	Mount Lemmon	Mount Lemmon Survey	KOR	950 m	MPC · JPL
813740	2007 RZ_{368}	—	September 10, 2007	Kitt Peak	Spacewatch	NYS	770 m	MPC · JPL
813741	2007 RH_{369}	—	September 10, 2007	Kitt Peak	Spacewatch	·	1.3 km	MPC · JPL
813742	2007 RJ_{370}	—	September 13, 2007	Mount Lemmon	Mount Lemmon Survey	KOR	1.1 km	MPC · JPL
813743	2007 SV_{8}	—	September 18, 2007	Kitt Peak	Spacewatch	·	460 m	MPC · JPL
813744	2007 SY_{25}	—	September 8, 2011	Kitt Peak	Spacewatch	MAR	760 m	MPC · JPL
813745	2007 SS_{29}	—	September 18, 2007	Kitt Peak	Spacewatch	·	1.7 km	MPC · JPL
813746	2007 TH_{4}	—	September 12, 2007	Catalina	CSS	·	1.6 km	MPC · JPL
813747	2007 TE_{21}	—	September 12, 2007	Catalina	CSS	·	1.3 km	MPC · JPL
813748	2007 TB_{26}	—	October 4, 2007	Mount Lemmon	Mount Lemmon Survey	·	740 m	MPC · JPL
813749	2007 TQ_{31}	—	September 15, 2007	Catalina	CSS	·	1.6 km	MPC · JPL
813750	2007 TE_{38}	—	October 4, 2007	Catalina	CSS	MAS	530 m	MPC · JPL
813751	2007 TO_{38}	—	September 14, 2007	Mount Lemmon	Mount Lemmon Survey	·	2.4 km	MPC · JPL
813752	2007 TV_{39}	—	October 6, 2007	Kitt Peak	Spacewatch	MRX	810 m	MPC · JPL
813753	2007 TA_{42}	—	September 12, 2007	Mount Lemmon	Mount Lemmon Survey	THM	1.7 km	MPC · JPL
813754	2007 TL_{45}	—	September 8, 2007	Mount Lemmon	Mount Lemmon Survey	·	440 m	MPC · JPL
813755	2007 TW_{50}	—	October 4, 2007	Kitt Peak	Spacewatch	·	980 m	MPC · JPL
813756	2007 TR_{59}	—	September 11, 2007	Mount Lemmon	Mount Lemmon Survey	·	920 m	MPC · JPL
813757	2007 TW_{63}	—	October 7, 2007	Mount Lemmon	Mount Lemmon Survey	·	600 m	MPC · JPL
813758	2007 TX_{67}	—	October 9, 2007	Mount Lemmon	Mount Lemmon Survey	·	1.0 km	MPC · JPL
813759	2007 TT_{72}	—	October 8, 2007	Mount Lemmon	Mount Lemmon Survey	H	400 m	MPC · JPL
813760	2007 TL_{73}	—	October 10, 2007	Kitt Peak	Spacewatch	·	1.0 km	MPC · JPL
813761	2007 TP_{78}	—	October 5, 2007	Kitt Peak	Spacewatch	·	1.1 km	MPC · JPL
813762	2007 TW_{88}	—	September 4, 2003	Kitt Peak	Spacewatch	·	890 m	MPC · JPL
813763	2007 TM_{98}	—	September 12, 2007	Mount Lemmon	Mount Lemmon Survey	NYS	850 m	MPC · JPL
813764	2007 TN_{98}	—	September 12, 2007	Mount Lemmon	Mount Lemmon Survey	MAS	510 m	MPC · JPL
813765	2007 TZ_{98}	—	September 4, 2003	Kitt Peak	Spacewatch	MAS	520 m	MPC · JPL
813766	2007 TK_{120}	—	September 5, 2007	Mount Lemmon	Mount Lemmon Survey	·	1.1 km	MPC · JPL
813767	2007 TP_{123}	—	September 8, 2007	Mount Lemmon	Mount Lemmon Survey	ERI	1.1 km	MPC · JPL
813768	2007 TO_{125}	—	September 8, 2007	Mount Lemmon	Mount Lemmon Survey	·	880 m	MPC · JPL
813769	2007 TF_{138}	—	September 10, 2007	Mount Lemmon	Mount Lemmon Survey	3:2	3.2 km	MPC · JPL
813770	2007 TP_{149}	—	September 13, 2007	Mount Lemmon	Mount Lemmon Survey	·	1.1 km	MPC · JPL
813771	2007 TP_{150}	—	September 13, 2007	Kitt Peak	Spacewatch	·	1.7 km	MPC · JPL
813772	2007 TL_{151}	—	November 4, 1996	Kitt Peak	Spacewatch	·	850 m	MPC · JPL
813773	2007 TB_{159}	—	September 28, 1997	Kitt Peak	Spacewatch	·	550 m	MPC · JPL
813774	2007 TN_{168}	—	October 8, 2007	Catalina	CSS	·	1.0 km	MPC · JPL
813775	2007 TK_{172}	—	October 14, 2007	Catalina	CSS	·	800 m	MPC · JPL
813776	2007 TK_{175}	—	October 4, 2007	Kitt Peak	Spacewatch	LIX	2.3 km	MPC · JPL
813777	2007 TC_{178}	—	October 6, 2007	Kitt Peak	Spacewatch	·	2.0 km	MPC · JPL
813778	2007 TS_{179}	—	October 7, 2007	Mount Lemmon	Mount Lemmon Survey	·	530 m	MPC · JPL
813779	2007 TG_{187}	—	October 12, 2007	Catalina	CSS	·	2.5 km	MPC · JPL
813780	2007 TF_{197}	—	August 10, 2007	Kitt Peak	Spacewatch	MAS	550 m	MPC · JPL
813781	2007 TH_{204}	—	October 8, 2007	Mount Lemmon	Mount Lemmon Survey	·	810 m	MPC · JPL
813782	2007 TW_{205}	—	October 9, 2007	Mount Lemmon	Mount Lemmon Survey	·	570 m	MPC · JPL
813783	2007 TY_{214}	—	October 7, 2007	Kitt Peak	Spacewatch	·	1.3 km	MPC · JPL
813784	2007 TX_{216}	—	October 7, 2007	Kitt Peak	Spacewatch	·	1.6 km	MPC · JPL
813785	2007 TG_{218}	—	October 7, 2007	Kitt Peak	Spacewatch	·	1.4 km	MPC · JPL
813786	2007 TO_{222}	—	October 9, 2007	Kitt Peak	Spacewatch	·	710 m	MPC · JPL
813787	2007 TY_{226}	—	October 8, 2007	Kitt Peak	Spacewatch	·	920 m	MPC · JPL
813788	2007 TU_{231}	—	October 8, 2007	Kitt Peak	Spacewatch	MAS	560 m	MPC · JPL
813789	2007 TR_{232}	—	September 17, 2003	Kitt Peak	Spacewatch	MAS	500 m	MPC · JPL
813790	2007 TJ_{241}	—	October 7, 2007	Mount Lemmon	Mount Lemmon Survey	·	690 m	MPC · JPL
813791	2007 TB_{245}	—	September 15, 2007	Catalina	CSS	·	1.1 km	MPC · JPL
813792	2007 TW_{249}	—	October 11, 2007	Mount Lemmon	Mount Lemmon Survey	·	410 m	MPC · JPL
813793	2007 TC_{250}	—	October 11, 2007	Mount Lemmon	Mount Lemmon Survey	·	860 m	MPC · JPL
813794	2007 TD_{252}	—	October 12, 2007	Mount Lemmon	Mount Lemmon Survey	·	1.5 km	MPC · JPL
813795	2007 TE_{253}	—	September 12, 2007	Mount Lemmon	Mount Lemmon Survey	·	1.4 km	MPC · JPL
813796	2007 TP_{258}	—	September 13, 2007	Mount Lemmon	Mount Lemmon Survey	·	2.6 km	MPC · JPL
813797	2007 TG_{260}	—	September 14, 2007	Mount Lemmon	Mount Lemmon Survey	·	840 m	MPC · JPL
813798	2007 TX_{260}	—	October 10, 2007	Kitt Peak	Spacewatch	·	910 m	MPC · JPL
813799	2007 TZ_{266}	—	October 9, 2007	Kitt Peak	Spacewatch	MAS	530 m	MPC · JPL
813800	2007 TK_{267}	—	September 12, 2007	Mount Lemmon	Mount Lemmon Survey	·	1.6 km	MPC · JPL

== 813801–813900 ==
back to top

Designation			Discovery			Properties		Ref
Permanent	Provisional	Named after	Date	Site	Discoverer(s)	Category	Diam.	Ref
813801	2007 TJ_{269}	—	October 9, 2007	Kitt Peak	Spacewatch	·	870 m	MPC · JPL
813802	2007 TU_{269}	—	October 9, 2007	Kitt Peak	Spacewatch	·	710 m	MPC · JPL
813803	2007 TU_{280}	—	September 10, 2007	Mount Lemmon	Mount Lemmon Survey	·	1.8 km	MPC · JPL
813804	2007 TT_{283}	—	September 12, 2007	Mount Lemmon	Mount Lemmon Survey	·	950 m	MPC · JPL
813805	2007 TY_{300}	—	October 12, 2007	Kitt Peak	Spacewatch	·	1.1 km	MPC · JPL
813806	2007 TR_{301}	—	October 12, 2007	Kitt Peak	Spacewatch	MIS	1.5 km	MPC · JPL
813807	2007 TK_{303}	—	October 4, 2007	Kitt Peak	Spacewatch	DOR	1.9 km	MPC · JPL
813808	2007 TZ_{303}	—	October 12, 2007	Mount Lemmon	Mount Lemmon Survey	·	630 m	MPC · JPL
813809	2007 TN_{309}	—	October 10, 2007	Mount Lemmon	Mount Lemmon Survey	NYS	1.1 km	MPC · JPL
813810	2007 TT_{310}	—	September 12, 2007	Mount Lemmon	Mount Lemmon Survey	·	920 m	MPC · JPL
813811	2007 TL_{318}	—	September 18, 2003	Kitt Peak	Spacewatch	·	740 m	MPC · JPL
813812	2007 TW_{324}	—	October 11, 2007	Kitt Peak	Spacewatch	·	2.7 km	MPC · JPL
813813	2007 TW_{328}	—	October 11, 2007	Kitt Peak	Spacewatch	·	800 m	MPC · JPL
813814	2007 TP_{335}	—	September 10, 2007	Mount Lemmon	Mount Lemmon Survey	·	520 m	MPC · JPL
813815	2007 TM_{342}	—	October 10, 2007	Mount Lemmon	Mount Lemmon Survey	·	590 m	MPC · JPL
813816	2007 TE_{349}	—	October 15, 2007	Mount Lemmon	Mount Lemmon Survey	·	860 m	MPC · JPL
813817	2007 TK_{351}	—	October 15, 2007	Mount Lemmon	Mount Lemmon Survey	·	870 m	MPC · JPL
813818	2007 TH_{365}	—	September 10, 2007	Mount Lemmon	Mount Lemmon Survey	·	1.1 km	MPC · JPL
813819	2007 TQ_{368}	—	October 11, 2007	Mount Lemmon	Mount Lemmon Survey	·	1.2 km	MPC · JPL
813820	2007 TJ_{370}	—	September 14, 2007	Mount Lemmon	Mount Lemmon Survey	·	1.0 km	MPC · JPL
813821	2007 TY_{374}	—	October 15, 2007	Mount Lemmon	Mount Lemmon Survey	·	750 m	MPC · JPL
813822	2007 TE_{375}	—	October 15, 2007	Mount Lemmon	Mount Lemmon Survey	·	940 m	MPC · JPL
813823	2007 TH_{375}	—	October 15, 2007	Mount Lemmon	Mount Lemmon Survey	·	810 m	MPC · JPL
813824	2007 TE_{379}	—	September 14, 2007	Mount Lemmon	Mount Lemmon Survey	·	500 m	MPC · JPL
813825	2007 TK_{382}	—	October 14, 2007	Kitt Peak	Spacewatch	·	1.3 km	MPC · JPL
813826 Vihart	2007 TE_{420}	Vihart	October 9, 2007	Catalina	CSS	·	1.1 km	MPC · JPL
813827	2007 TJ_{420}	—	October 9, 2007	Catalina	CSS	·	2.5 km	MPC · JPL
813828	2007 TY_{422}	—	October 14, 2007	Mount Lemmon	Mount Lemmon Survey	·	1.5 km	MPC · JPL
813829	2007 TH_{432}	—	October 4, 2007	Kitt Peak	Spacewatch	·	520 m	MPC · JPL
813830	2007 TG_{433}	—	October 9, 2007	Catalina	CSS	·	930 m	MPC · JPL
813831	2007 TW_{439}	—	October 9, 2007	Mount Lemmon	Mount Lemmon Survey	EOS	1.3 km	MPC · JPL
813832	2007 TE_{444}	—	October 7, 2007	Catalina	CSS	·	960 m	MPC · JPL
813833	2007 TG_{453}	—	October 9, 2007	Anderson Mesa	LONEOS	·	1.6 km	MPC · JPL
813834	2007 TM_{455}	—	October 8, 2007	Kitt Peak	Spacewatch	·	700 m	MPC · JPL
813835	2007 TK_{458}	—	October 12, 2007	Mount Lemmon	Mount Lemmon Survey	·	1.3 km	MPC · JPL
813836	2007 TF_{459}	—	October 15, 2007	Mount Lemmon	Mount Lemmon Survey	PHO	740 m	MPC · JPL
813837	2007 TZ_{459}	—	May 7, 2014	Haleakala	Pan-STARRS 1	·	900 m	MPC · JPL
813838	2007 TE_{461}	—	October 15, 2007	Kitt Peak	Spacewatch	·	1.4 km	MPC · JPL
813839	2007 TH_{461}	—	October 23, 2011	Kitt Peak	Spacewatch	V	500 m	MPC · JPL
813840	2007 TP_{461}	—	October 8, 2007	Kitt Peak	Spacewatch	·	500 m	MPC · JPL
813841	2007 TX_{467}	—	October 8, 2007	Kitt Peak	Spacewatch	·	780 m	MPC · JPL
813842	2007 TO_{468}	—	April 1, 2017	Haleakala	Pan-STARRS 1	·	2.4 km	MPC · JPL
813843	2007 TG_{469}	—	July 25, 2015	Haleakala	Pan-STARRS 1	·	870 m	MPC · JPL
813844	2007 TJ_{469}	—	October 4, 2007	Mount Lemmon	Mount Lemmon Survey	·	910 m	MPC · JPL
813845	2007 TA_{471}	—	December 31, 2011	Mount Lemmon	Mount Lemmon Survey	V	360 m	MPC · JPL
813846	2007 TT_{471}	—	March 18, 2017	Haleakala	Pan-STARRS 1	·	850 m	MPC · JPL
813847	2007 TL_{472}	—	May 21, 2014	Haleakala	Pan-STARRS 1	·	780 m	MPC · JPL
813848	2007 TX_{472}	—	April 9, 2010	Kitt Peak	Spacewatch	·	810 m	MPC · JPL
813849	2007 TB_{473}	—	October 10, 2007	Mount Lemmon	Mount Lemmon Survey	NYS	900 m	MPC · JPL
813850	2007 TS_{475}	—	July 13, 2018	Haleakala	Pan-STARRS 1	·	2.2 km	MPC · JPL
813851	2007 TK_{481}	—	October 12, 2007	Mount Lemmon	Mount Lemmon Survey	·	840 m	MPC · JPL
813852	2007 TN_{482}	—	October 10, 2007	Kitt Peak	Spacewatch	·	1.9 km	MPC · JPL
813853	2007 TQ_{485}	—	October 10, 2007	Mount Lemmon	Mount Lemmon Survey	·	660 m	MPC · JPL
813854	2007 TC_{486}	—	October 11, 2007	Mount Lemmon	Mount Lemmon Survey	·	840 m	MPC · JPL
813855	2007 TF_{489}	—	October 4, 2007	Mount Lemmon	Mount Lemmon Survey	·	440 m	MPC · JPL
813856	2007 TX_{491}	—	October 10, 2007	Mount Lemmon	Mount Lemmon Survey	·	420 m	MPC · JPL
813857	2007 TB_{493}	—	October 7, 2007	Mount Lemmon	Mount Lemmon Survey	·	910 m	MPC · JPL
813858	2007 TN_{493}	—	October 15, 2007	Mount Lemmon	Mount Lemmon Survey	EUN	920 m	MPC · JPL
813859	2007 TT_{497}	—	October 9, 2007	Mount Lemmon	Mount Lemmon Survey	·	550 m	MPC · JPL
813860	2007 TH_{498}	—	October 4, 2007	Mount Lemmon	Mount Lemmon Survey	·	1.4 km	MPC · JPL
813861	2007 TU_{500}	—	October 9, 2007	Kitt Peak	Spacewatch	·	1.8 km	MPC · JPL
813862	2007 TJ_{503}	—	October 4, 2007	Kitt Peak	Spacewatch	·	460 m	MPC · JPL
813863	2007 UD_{14}	—	October 16, 2007	Mount Lemmon	Mount Lemmon Survey	HNS	1.0 km	MPC · JPL
813864	2007 UX_{16}	—	October 18, 2007	Mount Lemmon	Mount Lemmon Survey	·	1.7 km	MPC · JPL
813865	2007 UO_{24}	—	October 8, 2007	Mount Lemmon	Mount Lemmon Survey	NYS	850 m	MPC · JPL
813866	2007 UF_{49}	—	October 24, 2007	Mount Lemmon	Mount Lemmon Survey	·	1.4 km	MPC · JPL
813867	2007 UE_{54}	—	October 10, 2007	Kitt Peak	Spacewatch	V	460 m	MPC · JPL
813868	2007 UQ_{57}	—	October 10, 2007	Mount Lemmon	Mount Lemmon Survey	H	350 m	MPC · JPL
813869	2007 UV_{63}	—	October 7, 2007	Mount Lemmon	Mount Lemmon Survey	(5)	960 m	MPC · JPL
813870	2007 UB_{66}	—	October 30, 2007	Mount Lemmon	Mount Lemmon Survey	APO	650 m	MPC · JPL
813871	2007 UM_{69}	—	October 7, 2007	Mount Lemmon	Mount Lemmon Survey	·	840 m	MPC · JPL
813872	2007 UA_{71}	—	October 30, 2007	Mount Lemmon	Mount Lemmon Survey	·	1.9 km	MPC · JPL
813873	2007 UO_{82}	—	October 19, 2007	Kitt Peak	Spacewatch	·	480 m	MPC · JPL
813874	2007 UG_{84}	—	October 30, 2007	Kitt Peak	Spacewatch	H	350 m	MPC · JPL
813875	2007 UP_{87}	—	October 30, 2007	Kitt Peak	Spacewatch	·	520 m	MPC · JPL
813876	2007 UL_{90}	—	October 18, 2007	Kitt Peak	Spacewatch	·	730 m	MPC · JPL
813877	2007 UZ_{95}	—	October 19, 2007	Mount Lemmon	Mount Lemmon Survey	·	960 m	MPC · JPL
813878	2007 US_{96}	—	October 30, 2007	Kitt Peak	Spacewatch	·	500 m	MPC · JPL
813879	2007 UW_{96}	—	October 17, 2007	Mount Lemmon	Mount Lemmon Survey	V	430 m	MPC · JPL
813880	2007 UG_{97}	—	September 15, 2007	Mount Lemmon	Mount Lemmon Survey	·	500 m	MPC · JPL
813881	2007 UB_{98}	—	October 30, 2007	Mount Lemmon	Mount Lemmon Survey	·	730 m	MPC · JPL
813882	2007 US_{103}	—	October 30, 2007	Kitt Peak	Spacewatch	·	1.3 km	MPC · JPL
813883	2007 UL_{105}	—	October 30, 2007	Kitt Peak	Spacewatch	·	1.5 km	MPC · JPL
813884	2007 UJ_{110}	—	October 30, 2007	Mount Lemmon	Mount Lemmon Survey	WIT	760 m	MPC · JPL
813885	2007 UN_{110}	—	October 8, 2007	Kitt Peak	Spacewatch	·	1.3 km	MPC · JPL
813886	2007 UV_{120}	—	October 12, 2007	Kitt Peak	Spacewatch	·	1.5 km	MPC · JPL
813887	2007 UT_{126}	—	October 16, 2007	Mount Lemmon	Mount Lemmon Survey	DOR	1.7 km	MPC · JPL
813888	2007 UT_{129}	—	October 16, 2007	Kitt Peak	Spacewatch	·	1.8 km	MPC · JPL
813889	2007 UJ_{138}	—	October 19, 2007	Kitt Peak	Spacewatch	·	520 m	MPC · JPL
813890	2007 UM_{139}	—	October 24, 2007	Mount Lemmon	Mount Lemmon Survey	T_{j} (2.95)	2.1 km	MPC · JPL
813891	2007 US_{143}	—	October 16, 2007	Mount Lemmon	Mount Lemmon Survey	·	3.5 km	MPC · JPL
813892	2007 UD_{144}	—	October 18, 2007	Mount Lemmon	Mount Lemmon Survey	·	600 m	MPC · JPL
813893	2007 UG_{147}	—	January 27, 2012	Mount Lemmon	Mount Lemmon Survey	·	420 m	MPC · JPL
813894	2007 UN_{151}	—	September 26, 2016	Haleakala	Pan-STARRS 1	·	1.4 km	MPC · JPL
813895	2007 UJ_{157}	—	October 18, 2007	Kitt Peak	Spacewatch	·	1.3 km	MPC · JPL
813896	2007 UP_{158}	—	October 16, 2007	Mount Lemmon	Mount Lemmon Survey	·	1.3 km	MPC · JPL
813897	2007 UL_{160}	—	October 21, 2007	Kitt Peak	Spacewatch	·	540 m	MPC · JPL
813898	2007 VS_{9}	—	October 20, 2007	Mount Lemmon	Mount Lemmon Survey	·	1.8 km	MPC · JPL
813899	2007 VD_{12}	—	November 5, 2007	Catalina	CSS	APO · PHA	370 m	MPC · JPL
813900	2007 VV_{13}	—	November 1, 2007	Mount Lemmon	Mount Lemmon Survey	·	440 m	MPC · JPL

== 813901–814000 ==
back to top

Designation			Discovery			Properties		Ref
Permanent	Provisional	Named after	Date	Site	Discoverer(s)	Category	Diam.	Ref
813901	2007 VZ_{14}	—	October 20, 2007	Catalina	CSS	·	960 m	MPC · JPL
813902	2007 VW_{19}	—	October 18, 2007	Kitt Peak	Spacewatch	·	840 m	MPC · JPL
813903	2007 VD_{24}	—	November 2, 2007	Mount Lemmon	Mount Lemmon Survey	·	760 m	MPC · JPL
813904	2007 VZ_{31}	—	November 2, 2007	Kitt Peak	Spacewatch	·	950 m	MPC · JPL
813905	2007 VP_{32}	—	November 2, 2007	Kitt Peak	Spacewatch	·	1.4 km	MPC · JPL
813906	2007 VA_{37}	—	November 2, 2007	Catalina	CSS	PHO	670 m	MPC · JPL
813907	2007 VT_{40}	—	October 10, 2007	Mount Lemmon	Mount Lemmon Survey	·	1 km	MPC · JPL
813908	2007 VJ_{45}	—	October 9, 2007	Kitt Peak	Spacewatch	·	1.2 km	MPC · JPL
813909	2007 VU_{56}	—	April 6, 2002	Cerro Tololo	Deep Ecliptic Survey	·	390 m	MPC · JPL
813910	2007 VX_{56}	—	October 20, 2007	Mount Lemmon	Mount Lemmon Survey	·	1.2 km	MPC · JPL
813911	2007 VL_{60}	—	November 1, 2007	Kitt Peak	Spacewatch	H	430 m	MPC · JPL
813912	2007 VV_{65}	—	October 25, 2003	Kitt Peak	Spacewatch	EUN	860 m	MPC · JPL
813913	2007 VL_{71}	—	October 9, 2007	Catalina	CSS	H	460 m	MPC · JPL
813914	2007 VZ_{71}	—	October 8, 2007	Mount Lemmon	Mount Lemmon Survey	·	890 m	MPC · JPL
813915	2007 VX_{76}	—	November 3, 2007	Kitt Peak	Spacewatch	·	2.1 km	MPC · JPL
813916	2007 VN_{98}	—	October 9, 2007	Kitt Peak	Spacewatch	·	960 m	MPC · JPL
813917	2007 VJ_{99}	—	November 2, 2007	Kitt Peak	Spacewatch	·	1.8 km	MPC · JPL
813918	2007 VA_{114}	—	November 3, 2007	Kitt Peak	Spacewatch	PHO	870 m	MPC · JPL
813919	2007 VT_{127}	—	October 19, 2007	Mount Lemmon	Mount Lemmon Survey	H	380 m	MPC · JPL
813920	2007 VH_{138}	—	November 2, 2007	Kitt Peak	Spacewatch	·	1.0 km	MPC · JPL
813921	2007 VU_{153}	—	November 4, 2007	Kitt Peak	Spacewatch	·	2.4 km	MPC · JPL
813922	2007 VW_{157}	—	November 5, 2007	Kitt Peak	Spacewatch	·	780 m	MPC · JPL
813923	2007 VU_{158}	—	November 5, 2007	Kitt Peak	Spacewatch	·	760 m	MPC · JPL
813924	2007 VL_{162}	—	November 5, 2007	Kitt Peak	Spacewatch	·	1.1 km	MPC · JPL
813925	2007 VG_{166}	—	November 5, 2007	Kitt Peak	Spacewatch	·	1.5 km	MPC · JPL
813926	2007 VV_{171}	—	October 14, 2007	Mount Lemmon	Mount Lemmon Survey	(5)	780 m	MPC · JPL
813927	2007 VC_{174}	—	October 4, 2007	Kitt Peak	Spacewatch	MAS	590 m	MPC · JPL
813928	2007 VF_{174}	—	November 3, 2007	Kitt Peak	Spacewatch	·	810 m	MPC · JPL
813929	2007 VX_{177}	—	November 7, 2007	Mount Lemmon	Mount Lemmon Survey	·	1.7 km	MPC · JPL
813930	2007 VD_{183}	—	November 8, 2007	Mount Lemmon	Mount Lemmon Survey	V	430 m	MPC · JPL
813931	2007 VT_{188}	—	November 2, 2007	Mount Lemmon	Mount Lemmon Survey	H	390 m	MPC · JPL
813932	2007 VR_{212}	—	November 9, 2007	Kitt Peak	Spacewatch	MRX	880 m	MPC · JPL
813933	2007 VX_{214}	—	November 9, 2007	Kitt Peak	Spacewatch	·	900 m	MPC · JPL
813934	2007 VO_{224}	—	November 8, 2007	Kitt Peak	Spacewatch	·	550 m	MPC · JPL
813935	2007 VA_{225}	—	October 10, 2007	Mount Lemmon	Mount Lemmon Survey	·	1.3 km	MPC · JPL
813936	2007 VC_{238}	—	October 8, 2007	Mount Lemmon	Mount Lemmon Survey	·	1.6 km	MPC · JPL
813937	2007 VA_{245}	—	November 3, 2007	Kitt Peak	Spacewatch	·	630 m	MPC · JPL
813938	2007 VG_{254}	—	October 16, 2007	Kitt Peak	Spacewatch	·	950 m	MPC · JPL
813939	2007 VW_{291}	—	October 24, 2003	Kitt Peak	Spacewatch	·	770 m	MPC · JPL
813940	2007 VB_{293}	—	November 15, 2007	Mount Lemmon	Mount Lemmon Survey	V	430 m	MPC · JPL
813941	2007 VE_{295}	—	November 13, 2007	Mount Lemmon	Mount Lemmon Survey	PHO	730 m	MPC · JPL
813942	2007 VJ_{313}	—	November 8, 2007	Kitt Peak	Spacewatch	·	1.4 km	MPC · JPL
813943	2007 VR_{328}	—	October 14, 2007	Mount Lemmon	Mount Lemmon Survey	MAS	650 m	MPC · JPL
813944	2007 VP_{329}	—	October 9, 2007	Mount Lemmon	Mount Lemmon Survey	·	1.4 km	MPC · JPL
813945	2007 VD_{340}	—	November 2, 2007	Catalina	CSS	·	1.5 km	MPC · JPL
813946	2007 VV_{345}	—	November 2, 2007	Mount Lemmon	Mount Lemmon Survey	·	1.4 km	MPC · JPL
813947	2007 VC_{346}	—	November 3, 2007	Kitt Peak	Spacewatch	·	970 m	MPC · JPL
813948	2007 VS_{346}	—	July 30, 2014	Kitt Peak	Spacewatch	·	650 m	MPC · JPL
813949	2007 VB_{347}	—	November 29, 2014	Catalina	CSS	PHO	930 m	MPC · JPL
813950	2007 VD_{347}	—	November 2, 2007	Kitt Peak	Spacewatch	·	1.0 km	MPC · JPL
813951	2007 VS_{348}	—	December 23, 2017	Haleakala	Pan-STARRS 1	·	600 m	MPC · JPL
813952	2007 VE_{351}	—	July 27, 2011	Haleakala	Pan-STARRS 1	GEF	980 m	MPC · JPL
813953	2007 VL_{352}	—	October 13, 2015	Haleakala	Pan-STARRS 1	·	920 m	MPC · JPL
813954	2007 VB_{353}	—	November 14, 2007	Kitt Peak	Spacewatch	·	560 m	MPC · JPL
813955	2007 VD_{353}	—	October 21, 2007	Kitt Peak	Spacewatch	·	2.3 km	MPC · JPL
813956	2007 VD_{356}	—	August 31, 2017	Haleakala	Pan-STARRS 1	·	1.3 km	MPC · JPL
813957	2007 VR_{356}	—	January 28, 2017	Haleakala	Pan-STARRS 1	·	850 m	MPC · JPL
813958	2007 VD_{359}	—	November 13, 2007	Mount Lemmon	Mount Lemmon Survey	NYS	930 m	MPC · JPL
813959	2007 VB_{360}	—	November 3, 2007	Kitt Peak	Spacewatch	·	1.4 km	MPC · JPL
813960	2007 VX_{361}	—	March 22, 2015	Mount Lemmon	Mount Lemmon Survey	·	520 m	MPC · JPL
813961	2007 VW_{365}	—	November 13, 2007	Kitt Peak	Spacewatch	·	660 m	MPC · JPL
813962	2007 VM_{366}	—	November 11, 2007	Mount Lemmon	Mount Lemmon Survey	·	810 m	MPC · JPL
813963	2007 VT_{367}	—	September 10, 2007	Mount Lemmon	Mount Lemmon Survey	·	490 m	MPC · JPL
813964	2007 VC_{368}	—	November 9, 2007	Mount Lemmon	Mount Lemmon Survey	·	450 m	MPC · JPL
813965	2007 VP_{368}	—	November 12, 2007	Mount Lemmon	Mount Lemmon Survey	·	740 m	MPC · JPL
813966	2007 VG_{373}	—	November 8, 2007	Kitt Peak	Spacewatch	·	2.0 km	MPC · JPL
813967	2007 VO_{373}	—	November 12, 2007	Mount Lemmon	Mount Lemmon Survey	·	740 m	MPC · JPL
813968	2007 VD_{384}	—	November 7, 2007	Mount Lemmon	Mount Lemmon Survey	ADE	1.4 km	MPC · JPL
813969	2007 WH_{4}	—	October 30, 2007	Kitt Peak	Spacewatch	·	430 m	MPC · JPL
813970	2007 WE_{13}	—	November 18, 2007	Mount Lemmon	Mount Lemmon Survey	·	1.6 km	MPC · JPL
813971	2007 WN_{19}	—	November 18, 2007	Mount Lemmon	Mount Lemmon Survey	H	370 m	MPC · JPL
813972	2007 WD_{20}	—	November 18, 2007	Mount Lemmon	Mount Lemmon Survey	H	470 m	MPC · JPL
813973	2007 WP_{40}	—	November 18, 2007	Mount Lemmon	Mount Lemmon Survey	·	520 m	MPC · JPL
813974	2007 WS_{40}	—	November 18, 2007	Mount Lemmon	Mount Lemmon Survey	·	1.9 km	MPC · JPL
813975	2007 WX_{40}	—	November 18, 2007	Mount Lemmon	Mount Lemmon Survey	NYS	580 m	MPC · JPL
813976	2007 WK_{48}	—	October 20, 2007	Mount Lemmon	Mount Lemmon Survey	·	2.2 km	MPC · JPL
813977	2007 WZ_{50}	—	November 4, 2007	Kitt Peak	Spacewatch	·	750 m	MPC · JPL
813978	2007 WV_{64}	—	November 17, 2007	Mount Lemmon	Mount Lemmon Survey	PHO	740 m	MPC · JPL
813979	2007 WD_{65}	—	November 18, 2007	Mount Lemmon	Mount Lemmon Survey	(18466)	1.8 km	MPC · JPL
813980	2007 WG_{66}	—	October 20, 2012	Haleakala	Pan-STARRS 1	·	1.3 km	MPC · JPL
813981	2007 WR_{66}	—	June 24, 2011	Mount Lemmon	Mount Lemmon Survey	·	1.6 km	MPC · JPL
813982	2007 WD_{67}	—	November 27, 2013	Haleakala	Pan-STARRS 1	·	2.2 km	MPC · JPL
813983	2007 WH_{67}	—	October 24, 2011	Haleakala	Pan-STARRS 1	·	1.1 km	MPC · JPL
813984	2007 WS_{67}	—	October 22, 2011	Mount Lemmon	Mount Lemmon Survey	PHO	760 m	MPC · JPL
813985	2007 WA_{68}	—	November 20, 2007	Mount Lemmon	Mount Lemmon Survey	·	980 m	MPC · JPL
813986	2007 WN_{68}	—	September 28, 2017	Kitt Peak	Spacewatch	EOS	1.4 km	MPC · JPL
813987	2007 WR_{68}	—	April 27, 2017	Haleakala	Pan-STARRS 1	PHO	750 m	MPC · JPL
813988	2007 WC_{72}	—	November 17, 2007	Mount Lemmon	Mount Lemmon Survey	·	1.9 km	MPC · JPL
813989	2007 WB_{75}	—	November 19, 2007	Mount Lemmon	Mount Lemmon Survey	·	1.6 km	MPC · JPL
813990	2007 XG_{2}	—	November 4, 2007	Mount Lemmon	Mount Lemmon Survey	LIX	2.9 km	MPC · JPL
813991	2007 XH_{2}	—	November 5, 2007	Kitt Peak	Spacewatch	EUN	960 m	MPC · JPL
813992	2007 XF_{11}	—	November 21, 2007	Mount Lemmon	Mount Lemmon Survey	·	1.5 km	MPC · JPL
813993	2007 XT_{16}	—	December 10, 2007	Great Shefford	Birtwhistle, P.	AGN	810 m	MPC · JPL
813994	2007 XR_{29}	—	November 7, 2007	Kitt Peak	Spacewatch	·	510 m	MPC · JPL
813995	2007 XX_{47}	—	December 15, 2007	Kitt Peak	Spacewatch	·	550 m	MPC · JPL
813996	2007 XL_{55}	—	December 4, 2007	Mount Lemmon	Mount Lemmon Survey	·	840 m	MPC · JPL
813997	2007 XO_{60}	—	December 4, 2007	Kitt Peak	Spacewatch	DOR	1.7 km	MPC · JPL
813998	2007 XU_{60}	—	December 4, 2007	Catalina	CSS	·	1.7 km	MPC · JPL
813999	2007 XX_{62}	—	April 1, 2016	Haleakala	Pan-STARRS 1	·	570 m	MPC · JPL
814000	2007 XA_{63}	—	December 5, 2007	Kitt Peak	Spacewatch	·	550 m	MPC · JPL

back to top

== Meaning of names ==
As minor planet discoveries are confirmed, they are given a permanent number by the IAU's Minor Planet Center (MPC), and the discoverers can then submit names for them, following the IAU's naming conventions. The list below concerns those minor planets in the specified number-range that have received names, and explains the meanings of those names.

Official naming citations of newly named small Solar System bodies are approved and published in a bulletin by IAU's Working Group for Small Bodies Nomenclature (WGSBN). Before May 2021, citations were published in MPC's Minor Planet Circulars for many decades. Recent citations can also be found on the JPL Small-Body Database (SBDB). Until his death in 2016, German astronomer Lutz D. Schmadel compiled these citations into the Dictionary of Minor Planet Names (DMP) and regularly updated the collection.

Based on Paul Herget's The Names of the Minor Planets, Schmadel also researched the unclear origin of numerous asteroids, most of which had been named prior to World War II. This article incorporates text from this source, which is in the public domain: SBDB New namings may only be added to this list below after official publication as the preannouncement of names is condemned. The WGSBN publishes a comprehensive guideline for the naming rules of non-cometary small Solar System bodies.

Named minor planet	Provisional	This minor planet was named for...	Ref · Catalog
813688 Fongfeifei	2007 RL_{138}	Fong Fei-fei, known as the “Queen of Hats” and the “Angel of Laborers,” was an iconic Taiwanese singer. For her immense contributions to Taiwanese popular music, she was posthumously honored with the Special Contribution Award at both the 24th Golden Melody Awards and the 48th Golden Bell Awards.	IAU · 813688
813826 Vihart	2007 TE_{420}	Victoria “Vi” Hart, American recreational mathematician and educator, who is best known for their engaging explanations of mathematical ideas, often delivered through music or paper constructions such as hexaflexagons.	IAU · 813826
