= List of minor planets: 738001–739000 =

The following is a partial list of minor planets, running from minor-planet number 738001 through 739000, inclusive. The primary data for this and other partial lists is based on JPL's "Small-Body Orbital Elements" and data available from the Minor Planet Center. Critical list information is also provided by the MPC, unless otherwise specified from Lowell Observatory. A detailed description of the table's columns and additional sources are given on the main page including a complete list of every page in this series, and a statistical break-up on the dynamical classification of minor planets.

Also see the summary list of all named bodies in numerical and alphabetical order, and the corresponding naming citations for the number range of this particular list. New namings may only be added to this list after official publication, as the preannouncement of names is condemned by the Working Group for Small Bodies Nomenclature of the International Astronomical Union.

Near-Earth obj.	MBA (inner)	MBA (outer)	Centaur
Mars-crosser	MBA (middle)	Jupiter trojan	Trans-Neptunian obj.
Unclassified

== 738001–738100 ==
Designation			Discovery			Properties		Ref
Permanent	Provisional	Named after	Date	Site	Discoverer(s)	Category	Diam.	Ref
738001	2016 FZ_{75}	—	March 16, 2016	Haleakala	Pan-STARRS 1	·	2.5 km	MPC · JPL
738002	2016 FB_{77}	—	March 18, 2016	Mount Lemmon	Mount Lemmon Survey	·	2.5 km	MPC · JPL
738003	2016 FG_{77}	—	March 29, 2016	Haleakala	Pan-STARRS 1	·	1.9 km	MPC · JPL
738004	2016 FW_{77}	—	March 18, 2016	Mount Lemmon	Mount Lemmon Survey	EOS	1.4 km	MPC · JPL
738005	2016 FS_{78}	—	March 24, 2006	Mount Lemmon	Mount Lemmon Survey	KOR	1.1 km	MPC · JPL
738006	2016 FP_{110}	—	March 28, 2016	Cerro Tololo-DECam	DECam	·	1.5 km	MPC · JPL
738007	2016 FV_{112}	—	August 15, 2013	Haleakala	Pan-STARRS 1	·	1.4 km	MPC · JPL
738008	2016 FP_{156}	—	January 17, 2015	Mount Lemmon	Mount Lemmon Survey	EOS	1.6 km	MPC · JPL
738009	2016 GC_{5}	—	August 11, 2010	WISE	WISE	·	1.4 km	MPC · JPL
738010	2016 GP_{5}	—	November 29, 2014	Kitt Peak	Spacewatch	HYG	2.3 km	MPC · JPL
738011	2016 GS_{6}	—	September 2, 2013	Mount Lemmon	Mount Lemmon Survey	·	1.5 km	MPC · JPL
738012	2016 GP_{7}	—	September 21, 2009	Kitt Peak	Spacewatch	·	1.3 km	MPC · JPL
738013	2016 GF_{10}	—	September 12, 2007	Mount Lemmon	Mount Lemmon Survey	·	2.6 km	MPC · JPL
738014	2016 GH_{11}	—	April 8, 2010	WISE	WISE	·	2.5 km	MPC · JPL
738015	2016 GM_{15}	—	September 7, 2004	Kitt Peak	Spacewatch	·	1.3 km	MPC · JPL
738016	2016 GV_{16}	—	August 13, 2012	Haleakala	Pan-STARRS 1	·	2.4 km	MPC · JPL
738017	2016 GT_{17}	—	December 10, 2009	Mount Lemmon	Mount Lemmon Survey	KOR	1.1 km	MPC · JPL
738018	2016 GT_{18}	—	September 28, 2003	Kitt Peak	Spacewatch	·	1.5 km	MPC · JPL
738019	2016 GW_{18}	—	February 4, 2010	WISE	WISE	·	1.7 km	MPC · JPL
738020	2016 GG_{19}	—	October 6, 2008	Kitt Peak	Spacewatch	·	2.2 km	MPC · JPL
738021	2016 GZ_{19}	—	September 26, 2003	Apache Point	SDSS	KOR	1.1 km	MPC · JPL
738022	2016 GB_{20}	—	September 3, 2008	Kitt Peak	Spacewatch	·	1.8 km	MPC · JPL
738023	2016 GE_{20}	—	March 21, 2009	Kitt Peak	Spacewatch	·	580 m	MPC · JPL
738024	2016 GF_{20}	—	February 25, 2006	Mount Lemmon	Mount Lemmon Survey	KOR	1.1 km	MPC · JPL
738025	2016 GV_{22}	—	March 13, 2016	Haleakala	Pan-STARRS 1	·	1.2 km	MPC · JPL
738026	2016 GP_{24}	—	September 14, 2007	Kitt Peak	Spacewatch	·	2.2 km	MPC · JPL
738027	2016 GG_{25}	—	October 11, 2007	Kitt Peak	Spacewatch	·	2.3 km	MPC · JPL
738028	2016 GQ_{25}	—	March 10, 2016	Haleakala	Pan-STARRS 1	·	2.7 km	MPC · JPL
738029	2016 GZ_{25}	—	February 15, 2010	Kitt Peak	Spacewatch	·	2.5 km	MPC · JPL
738030	2016 GY_{26}	—	October 26, 2008	Kitt Peak	Spacewatch	·	2.3 km	MPC · JPL
738031	2016 GL_{29}	—	September 14, 2007	Mount Lemmon	Mount Lemmon Survey	VER	1.9 km	MPC · JPL
738032	2016 GA_{30}	—	January 17, 2016	Haleakala	Pan-STARRS 1	·	2.8 km	MPC · JPL
738033	2016 GH_{30}	—	March 13, 2011	Mount Lemmon	Mount Lemmon Survey	·	1.7 km	MPC · JPL
738034	2016 GB_{35}	—	October 25, 2013	Kitt Peak	Spacewatch	·	2.2 km	MPC · JPL
738035	2016 GB_{36}	—	April 16, 2005	Kitt Peak	Spacewatch	HYG	2.9 km	MPC · JPL
738036	2016 GD_{36}	—	December 25, 2005	Kitt Peak	Spacewatch	HOF	2.8 km	MPC · JPL
738037	2016 GU_{37}	—	February 10, 2011	Mount Lemmon	Mount Lemmon Survey	AGN	770 m	MPC · JPL
738038	2016 GW_{37}	—	August 15, 2013	Haleakala	Pan-STARRS 1	·	2.2 km	MPC · JPL
738039	2016 GY_{43}	—	October 18, 2007	Kitt Peak	Spacewatch	·	1.9 km	MPC · JPL
738040	2016 GO_{49}	—	October 1, 2013	Mount Lemmon	Mount Lemmon Survey	·	1.6 km	MPC · JPL
738041	2016 GG_{55}	—	November 9, 2009	Kitt Peak	Spacewatch	HOF	2.4 km	MPC · JPL
738042	2016 GJ_{55}	—	February 15, 2010	Mount Lemmon	Mount Lemmon Survey	·	2.4 km	MPC · JPL
738043	2016 GL_{57}	—	January 19, 2015	Mount Lemmon	Mount Lemmon Survey	VER	2.2 km	MPC · JPL
738044	2016 GR_{67}	—	September 13, 2007	Mount Lemmon	Mount Lemmon Survey	·	2.6 km	MPC · JPL
738045	2016 GT_{67}	—	March 11, 2016	Haleakala	Pan-STARRS 1	·	1.4 km	MPC · JPL
738046	2016 GL_{68}	—	January 20, 2010	Črni Vrh	Matičič, S.	·	3.6 km	MPC · JPL
738047	2016 GF_{72}	—	March 11, 2005	Kitt Peak	Deep Ecliptic Survey	MAS	580 m	MPC · JPL
738048	2016 GV_{72}	—	March 18, 2010	Mount Lemmon	Mount Lemmon Survey	·	2.5 km	MPC · JPL
738049	2016 GN_{74}	—	August 15, 2013	Haleakala	Pan-STARRS 1	·	1.4 km	MPC · JPL
738050	2016 GC_{83}	—	October 2, 2013	Haleakala	Pan-STARRS 1	·	2.0 km	MPC · JPL
738051	2016 GD_{85}	—	April 1, 2016	Mount Lemmon	Mount Lemmon Survey	AGN	880 m	MPC · JPL
738052	2016 GG_{88}	—	February 16, 2009	La Sagra	OAM	·	630 m	MPC · JPL
738053	2016 GP_{93}	—	April 10, 2005	Kitt Peak	Spacewatch	NYS	1.1 km	MPC · JPL
738054	2016 GD_{96}	—	August 20, 2006	Palomar	NEAT	·	4.3 km	MPC · JPL
738055	2016 GZ_{100}	—	March 20, 1999	Apache Point	SDSS Collaboration	·	2.4 km	MPC · JPL
738056	2016 GN_{102}	—	March 11, 2016	Haleakala	Pan-STARRS 1	·	600 m	MPC · JPL
738057	2016 GL_{103}	—	November 1, 2008	Mount Lemmon	Mount Lemmon Survey	·	1.5 km	MPC · JPL
738058	2016 GT_{103}	—	October 10, 2008	Mount Lemmon	Mount Lemmon Survey	·	3.4 km	MPC · JPL
738059	2016 GX_{108}	—	January 19, 2012	Haleakala	Pan-STARRS 1	NYS	840 m	MPC · JPL
738060	2016 GR_{109}	—	September 3, 2013	Calar Alto	F. Hormuth	KOR	1.0 km	MPC · JPL
738061	2016 GS_{109}	—	November 5, 2007	Kitt Peak	Spacewatch	·	2.4 km	MPC · JPL
738062	2016 GD_{111}	—	October 24, 2013	Mount Lemmon	Mount Lemmon Survey	·	2.2 km	MPC · JPL
738063	2016 GT_{117}	—	April 1, 2016	Haleakala	Pan-STARRS 1	·	1.1 km	MPC · JPL
738064	2016 GK_{122}	—	May 12, 2010	WISE	WISE	3:2 · SHU	4.5 km	MPC · JPL
738065	2016 GS_{123}	—	May 12, 2005	Palomar	NEAT	EUP	5.0 km	MPC · JPL
738066	2016 GQ_{124}	—	January 17, 2005	Kitt Peak	Spacewatch	·	780 m	MPC · JPL
738067	2016 GB_{125}	—	November 1, 2013	Mount Lemmon	Mount Lemmon Survey	·	1.6 km	MPC · JPL
738068	2016 GK_{126}	—	April 22, 2009	Mount Lemmon	Mount Lemmon Survey	·	860 m	MPC · JPL
738069	2016 GV_{127}	—	October 29, 2008	Mount Lemmon	Mount Lemmon Survey	·	2.5 km	MPC · JPL
738070	2016 GZ_{128}	—	February 26, 2004	Kitt Peak	Deep Ecliptic Survey	·	2.6 km	MPC · JPL
738071	2016 GE_{130}	—	April 15, 2010	Mount Lemmon	Mount Lemmon Survey	(260)	3.2 km	MPC · JPL
738072	2016 GB_{132}	—	April 9, 2005	Kitt Peak	Spacewatch	VER	3.7 km	MPC · JPL
738073	2016 GW_{132}	—	March 21, 2010	Catalina	CSS	·	4.6 km	MPC · JPL
738074	2016 GZ_{132}	—	June 11, 2010	WISE	WISE	·	4.1 km	MPC · JPL
738075	2016 GW_{135}	—	May 26, 2010	WISE	WISE	·	3.3 km	MPC · JPL
738076	2016 GK_{137}	—	February 7, 2011	Mount Lemmon	Mount Lemmon Survey	·	1.2 km	MPC · JPL
738077	2016 GO_{137}	—	March 13, 2016	Haleakala	Pan-STARRS 1	·	1.2 km	MPC · JPL
738078	2016 GV_{138}	—	April 1, 2016	Haleakala	Pan-STARRS 1	·	670 m	MPC · JPL
738079	2016 GF_{140}	—	April 27, 2009	Kitt Peak	Spacewatch	·	760 m	MPC · JPL
738080	2016 GM_{141}	—	December 19, 2004	Mount Lemmon	Mount Lemmon Survey	TEL	1.5 km	MPC · JPL
738081	2016 GR_{142}	—	September 18, 1995	Kitt Peak	Spacewatch	·	3.8 km	MPC · JPL
738082	2016 GN_{146}	—	July 29, 2008	Kitt Peak	Spacewatch	·	2.6 km	MPC · JPL
738083	2016 GY_{146}	—	April 12, 2005	Mount Lemmon	Mount Lemmon Survey	·	2.9 km	MPC · JPL
738084	2016 GP_{147}	—	September 28, 2013	Haleakala	Pan-STARRS 1	EUN	1.1 km	MPC · JPL
738085	2016 GY_{147}	—	October 3, 2013	Haleakala	Pan-STARRS 1	·	2.5 km	MPC · JPL
738086	2016 GL_{148}	—	May 23, 2010	WISE	WISE	3:2 · SHU	4.5 km	MPC · JPL
738087	2016 GF_{149}	—	September 18, 2007	Kitt Peak	Spacewatch	·	2.8 km	MPC · JPL
738088	2016 GR_{149}	—	May 10, 2010	WISE	WISE	·	2.6 km	MPC · JPL
738089	2016 GR_{153}	—	January 3, 2012	Kitt Peak	Spacewatch	·	1.2 km	MPC · JPL
738090	2016 GJ_{155}	—	November 17, 2008	Kitt Peak	Spacewatch	·	2.4 km	MPC · JPL
738091	2016 GD_{156}	—	January 17, 2010	Kitt Peak	Spacewatch	·	2.5 km	MPC · JPL
738092	2016 GM_{156}	—	May 26, 2006	Mount Lemmon	Mount Lemmon Survey	·	740 m	MPC · JPL
738093	2016 GQ_{156}	—	October 20, 2011	Mount Lemmon	Mount Lemmon Survey	·	540 m	MPC · JPL
738094	2016 GL_{158}	—	June 18, 2010	WISE	WISE	·	3.5 km	MPC · JPL
738095	2016 GJ_{159}	—	March 29, 2008	Kitt Peak	Spacewatch	·	1.1 km	MPC · JPL
738096	2016 GO_{159}	—	May 23, 2006	Kitt Peak	Spacewatch	EOS	1.6 km	MPC · JPL
738097	2016 GT_{160}	—	December 21, 2008	Kitt Peak	Spacewatch	·	520 m	MPC · JPL
738098	2016 GE_{161}	—	November 19, 2008	Kitt Peak	Spacewatch	·	2.3 km	MPC · JPL
738099	2016 GZ_{163}	—	November 9, 2004	Mauna Kea	Veillet, C.	·	530 m	MPC · JPL
738100	2016 GH_{167}	—	February 11, 2016	Haleakala	Pan-STARRS 1	·	1.4 km	MPC · JPL

== 738101–738200 ==
back to top

Designation			Discovery			Properties		Ref
Permanent	Provisional	Named after	Date	Site	Discoverer(s)	Category	Diam.	Ref
738101	2016 GT_{168}	—	October 18, 2014	Kitt Peak	Spacewatch	·	590 m	MPC · JPL
738102	2016 GY_{168}	—	January 26, 2010	WISE	WISE	·	2.0 km	MPC · JPL
738103	2016 GF_{169}	—	November 6, 2013	Calar Alto-CASADO	Proffe, G., Hellmich, S.	·	1.8 km	MPC · JPL
738104	2016 GX_{169}	—	November 6, 2010	Mount Lemmon	Mount Lemmon Survey	L4	7.1 km	MPC · JPL
738105	2016 GZ_{169}	—	February 7, 2010	WISE	WISE	·	3.8 km	MPC · JPL
738106	2016 GR_{170}	—	October 23, 2006	Mount Lemmon	Mount Lemmon Survey	·	1.1 km	MPC · JPL
738107	2016 GF_{171}	—	April 19, 2006	Kitt Peak	Spacewatch	·	2.1 km	MPC · JPL
738108	2016 GA_{172}	—	September 12, 2007	Mount Lemmon	Mount Lemmon Survey	ELF	3.2 km	MPC · JPL
738109	2016 GC_{172}	—	May 26, 2011	Mount Lemmon	Mount Lemmon Survey	·	1.7 km	MPC · JPL
738110	2016 GM_{175}	—	September 17, 2001	Kitt Peak	Spacewatch	·	3.8 km	MPC · JPL
738111	2016 GF_{178}	—	April 9, 2003	Kitt Peak	Spacewatch	·	1.2 km	MPC · JPL
738112	2016 GF_{179}	—	November 1, 2008	Mount Lemmon	Mount Lemmon Survey	EOS	1.9 km	MPC · JPL
738113	2016 GM_{179}	—	September 26, 2003	Apache Point	SDSS Collaboration	·	860 m	MPC · JPL
738114	2016 GU_{180}	—	January 17, 2015	Mount Lemmon	Mount Lemmon Survey	·	2.4 km	MPC · JPL
738115	2016 GE_{181}	—	March 15, 2016	Mount Lemmon	Mount Lemmon Survey	EOS	1.6 km	MPC · JPL
738116	2016 GM_{183}	—	March 19, 2010	Mount Lemmon	Mount Lemmon Survey	·	2.5 km	MPC · JPL
738117	2016 GC_{185}	—	January 13, 2015	Haleakala	Pan-STARRS 1	·	1.5 km	MPC · JPL
738118	2016 GY_{185}	—	February 21, 2010	WISE	WISE	·	3.1 km	MPC · JPL
738119	2016 GR_{186}	—	October 9, 2008	Kitt Peak	Spacewatch	·	2.6 km	MPC · JPL
738120	2016 GS_{186}	—	April 3, 2016	Haleakala	Pan-STARRS 1	·	1.5 km	MPC · JPL
738121	2016 GC_{188}	—	March 31, 2016	Haleakala	Pan-STARRS 1	VER	2.5 km	MPC · JPL
738122	2016 GE_{188}	—	December 11, 2014	Mount Lemmon	Mount Lemmon Survey	·	1.0 km	MPC · JPL
738123	2016 GK_{190}	—	February 14, 2005	Catalina	CSS	·	2.9 km	MPC · JPL
738124	2016 GP_{193}	—	October 29, 2002	Apache Point	SDSS Collaboration	·	2.0 km	MPC · JPL
738125	2016 GR_{193}	—	November 1, 2008	Mount Lemmon	Mount Lemmon Survey	EMA	3.4 km	MPC · JPL
738126	2016 GD_{196}	—	January 14, 2015	Haleakala	Pan-STARRS 1	·	1.9 km	MPC · JPL
738127	2016 GW_{198}	—	May 17, 2010	WISE	WISE	·	2.9 km	MPC · JPL
738128	2016 GC_{199}	—	April 4, 2016	Mount Lemmon	Mount Lemmon Survey	·	1.4 km	MPC · JPL
738129	2016 GH_{199}	—	May 2, 2005	Goodricke-Pigott	R. A. Tucker	·	3.4 km	MPC · JPL
738130	2016 GW_{199}	—	December 29, 2014	Haleakala	Pan-STARRS 1	EOS	1.7 km	MPC · JPL
738131	2016 GR_{201}	—	May 13, 2010	WISE	WISE	LIX	3.3 km	MPC · JPL
738132	2016 GU_{203}	—	August 13, 2012	Haleakala	Pan-STARRS 1	·	2.6 km	MPC · JPL
738133	2016 GR_{204}	—	March 10, 2005	Moletai	K. Černis, Zdanavicius, J.	·	3.2 km	MPC · JPL
738134	2016 GT_{205}	—	March 9, 2002	Anderson Mesa	LONEOS	·	3.4 km	MPC · JPL
738135	2016 GN_{207}	—	October 22, 2008	Kitt Peak	Spacewatch	·	3.7 km	MPC · JPL
738136	2016 GS_{207}	—	May 18, 2010	WISE	WISE	·	2.7 km	MPC · JPL
738137	2016 GE_{208}	—	May 10, 2010	WISE	WISE	VER	3.2 km	MPC · JPL
738138	2016 GU_{211}	—	March 2, 2006	Kitt Peak	Spacewatch	KOR	1.1 km	MPC · JPL
738139	2016 GC_{212}	—	April 9, 2016	Haleakala	Pan-STARRS 1	EOS	1.7 km	MPC · JPL
738140	2016 GK_{213}	—	September 5, 2008	Kitt Peak	Spacewatch	·	3.2 km	MPC · JPL
738141	2016 GQ_{215}	—	April 10, 2005	Kitt Peak	Spacewatch	·	3.5 km	MPC · JPL
738142	2016 GU_{215}	—	August 19, 2011	Haleakala	Pan-STARRS 1	·	2.8 km	MPC · JPL
738143	2016 GQ_{217}	—	March 31, 1995	Kitt Peak	Spacewatch	·	3.9 km	MPC · JPL
738144	2016 GD_{218}	—	May 13, 2005	Kitt Peak	Spacewatch	·	2.8 km	MPC · JPL
738145	2016 GH_{218}	—	February 10, 2002	Socorro	LINEAR	·	2.3 km	MPC · JPL
738146	2016 GP_{218}	—	October 23, 2009	Mount Lemmon	Mount Lemmon Survey	·	2.0 km	MPC · JPL
738147	2016 GX_{218}	—	September 8, 2002	Ondřejov	P. Pravec, P. Kušnirák	·	970 m	MPC · JPL
738148	2016 GV_{226}	—	July 15, 2013	Haleakala	Pan-STARRS 1	·	730 m	MPC · JPL
738149	2016 GO_{227}	—	April 9, 2010	Mount Lemmon	Mount Lemmon Survey	URS	2.8 km	MPC · JPL
738150	2016 GX_{227}	—	April 2, 2016	Kitt Peak	Spacewatch	·	520 m	MPC · JPL
738151	2016 GC_{228}	—	June 10, 2010	WISE	WISE	·	2.2 km	MPC · JPL
738152	2016 GC_{231}	—	June 11, 2013	Mount Lemmon	Mount Lemmon Survey	·	900 m	MPC · JPL
738153	2016 GM_{231}	—	October 12, 2013	Kitt Peak	Spacewatch	(31811)	2.5 km	MPC · JPL
738154	2016 GP_{232}	—	November 14, 2013	Mount Lemmon	Mount Lemmon Survey	·	2.9 km	MPC · JPL
738155	2016 GV_{233}	—	April 14, 2016	Haleakala	Pan-STARRS 1	·	1 km	MPC · JPL
738156	2016 GM_{236}	—	February 10, 2008	Kitt Peak	Spacewatch	·	970 m	MPC · JPL
738157	2016 GV_{236}	—	February 11, 2010	WISE	WISE	·	2.8 km	MPC · JPL
738158	2016 GX_{236}	—	November 3, 2005	Mount Lemmon	Mount Lemmon Survey	·	1.3 km	MPC · JPL
738159	2016 GD_{238}	—	April 14, 2016	Haleakala	Pan-STARRS 1	·	3.1 km	MPC · JPL
738160	2016 GU_{238}	—	October 9, 2002	Palomar	NEAT	·	1.7 km	MPC · JPL
738161	2016 GK_{242}	—	November 9, 2004	Mauna Kea	Veillet, C.	·	2.3 km	MPC · JPL
738162	2016 GG_{243}	—	May 14, 2010	WISE	WISE	·	2.4 km	MPC · JPL
738163	2016 GK_{243}	—	February 13, 2002	Apache Point	SDSS Collaboration	·	600 m	MPC · JPL
738164	2016 GE_{249}	—	January 19, 2005	Kitt Peak	Spacewatch	·	1.7 km	MPC · JPL
738165	2016 GG_{249}	—	April 22, 2009	Mount Lemmon	Mount Lemmon Survey	·	720 m	MPC · JPL
738166	2016 GA_{257}	—	November 4, 2013	Mount Lemmon	Mount Lemmon Survey	·	1.8 km	MPC · JPL
738167	2016 GL_{267}	—	April 14, 2016	Haleakala	Pan-STARRS 1	·	3.1 km	MPC · JPL
738168	2016 GA_{268}	—	April 1, 2016	Haleakala	Pan-STARRS 1	·	770 m	MPC · JPL
738169	2016 GF_{278}	—	April 4, 2016	Mount Lemmon	Mount Lemmon Survey	ADE	1.7 km	MPC · JPL
738170	2016 GM_{278}	—	April 1, 2016	Haleakala	Pan-STARRS 1	·	490 m	MPC · JPL
738171	2016 GR_{278}	—	April 3, 2016	Mount Lemmon	Mount Lemmon Survey	VER	2.1 km	MPC · JPL
738172	2016 GA_{279}	—	April 5, 2016	Haleakala	Pan-STARRS 1	·	2.6 km	MPC · JPL
738173	2016 GB_{279}	—	April 15, 2016	Haleakala	Pan-STARRS 1	·	860 m	MPC · JPL
738174	2016 GK_{279}	—	April 1, 2016	Haleakala	Pan-STARRS 1	·	620 m	MPC · JPL
738175	2016 GT_{282}	—	April 5, 2016	Haleakala	Pan-STARRS 1	·	700 m	MPC · JPL
738176	2016 GL_{290}	—	April 3, 2016	Haleakala	Pan-STARRS 1	·	540 m	MPC · JPL
738177	2016 GS_{299}	—	April 1, 2016	Haleakala	Pan-STARRS 1	·	1.8 km	MPC · JPL
738178	2016 GO_{304}	—	April 5, 2016	Haleakala	Pan-STARRS 1	·	2.5 km	MPC · JPL
738179	2016 GB_{316}	—	January 17, 2015	Haleakala	Pan-STARRS 1	·	2.8 km	MPC · JPL
738180	2016 GC_{316}	—	January 23, 2015	Haleakala	Pan-STARRS 1	·	2.1 km	MPC · JPL
738181	2016 GG_{323}	—	April 2, 2016	Haleakala	Pan-STARRS 1	·	1.3 km	MPC · JPL
738182	2016 GV_{325}	—	April 5, 2011	Mount Lemmon	Mount Lemmon Survey	·	1.7 km	MPC · JPL
738183	2016 GD_{333}	—	April 15, 2016	Haleakala	Pan-STARRS 1	·	3.3 km	MPC · JPL
738184	2016 HJ_{11}	—	May 14, 2010	WISE	WISE	·	3.2 km	MPC · JPL
738185	2016 HS_{12}	—	January 15, 2015	Mount Lemmon	Mount Lemmon Survey	·	1.6 km	MPC · JPL
738186	2016 HD_{13}	—	February 15, 2010	Mount Lemmon	Mount Lemmon Survey	HYG	2.2 km	MPC · JPL
738187	2016 HZ_{13}	—	November 1, 2007	Mount Lemmon	Mount Lemmon Survey	EOS	1.6 km	MPC · JPL
738188	2016 HA_{14}	—	September 18, 2007	Kitt Peak	Spacewatch	EOS	1.6 km	MPC · JPL
738189	2016 HH_{14}	—	November 5, 2007	Mount Lemmon	Mount Lemmon Survey	THM	3.2 km	MPC · JPL
738190	2016 HR_{14}	—	November 7, 2007	Mount Lemmon	Mount Lemmon Survey	VER	2.1 km	MPC · JPL
738191	2016 HO_{17}	—	January 18, 2015	Mount Lemmon	Mount Lemmon Survey	V	550 m	MPC · JPL
738192	2016 HQ_{20}	—	April 30, 2016	Mount Lemmon	Mount Lemmon Survey	·	2.4 km	MPC · JPL
738193	2016 HK_{21}	—	April 14, 2005	Catalina	CSS	LUT	4.3 km	MPC · JPL
738194	2016 HR_{21}	—	September 25, 2008	Mount Lemmon	Mount Lemmon Survey	EUP	3.4 km	MPC · JPL
738195	2016 HL_{22}	—	January 20, 2009	Kitt Peak	Spacewatch	·	530 m	MPC · JPL
738196	2016 HB_{24}	—	January 13, 2008	Mount Lemmon	Mount Lemmon Survey	H	430 m	MPC · JPL
738197	2016 HK_{24}	—	May 8, 2005	Kitt Peak	Spacewatch	·	2.3 km	MPC · JPL
738198	2016 HD_{26}	—	April 30, 2016	Haleakala	Pan-STARRS 1	SUL	1.4 km	MPC · JPL
738199	2016 JY	—	May 11, 2010	WISE	WISE	·	2.9 km	MPC · JPL
738200	2016 JH_{2}	—	February 11, 2016	Haleakala	Pan-STARRS 1	V	460 m	MPC · JPL

== 738201–738300 ==
back to top

Designation			Discovery			Properties		Ref
Permanent	Provisional	Named after	Date	Site	Discoverer(s)	Category	Diam.	Ref
738201	2016 JT_{3}	—	June 30, 2013	Haleakala	Pan-STARRS 1	·	720 m	MPC · JPL
738202	2016 JK_{10}	—	August 2, 2003	Haleakala	NEAT	·	630 m	MPC · JPL
738203	2016 JA_{13}	—	February 26, 2004	Kitt Peak	Deep Ecliptic Survey	EOS	3.0 km	MPC · JPL
738204	2016 JL_{13}	—	January 23, 2010	WISE	WISE	LUT	3.5 km	MPC · JPL
738205	2016 JG_{15}	—	January 20, 2010	WISE	WISE	·	3.6 km	MPC · JPL
738206	2016 JG_{16}	—	October 3, 2013	Haleakala	Pan-STARRS 1	·	1.8 km	MPC · JPL
738207	2016 JF_{19}	—	June 2, 2010	WISE	WISE	·	2.6 km	MPC · JPL
738208	2016 JE_{26}	—	September 19, 2001	Apache Point	SDSS Collaboration	·	3.7 km	MPC · JPL
738209	2016 JN_{26}	—	January 19, 2015	Haleakala	Pan-STARRS 1	·	1.6 km	MPC · JPL
738210	2016 JQ_{30}	—	March 5, 2016	Haleakala	Pan-STARRS 1	·	1.1 km	MPC · JPL
738211	2016 JU_{30}	—	June 5, 2006	Socorro	LINEAR	·	870 m	MPC · JPL
738212	2016 JF_{33}	—	January 7, 2009	Kitt Peak	Spacewatch	·	3.4 km	MPC · JPL
738213	2016 JY_{33}	—	May 16, 2005	Kitt Peak	Spacewatch	L4 · 006	10 km	MPC · JPL
738214	2016 JD_{37}	—	January 23, 2010	WISE	WISE	T_{j} (2.99)	2.8 km	MPC · JPL
738215	2016 KY_{1}	—	June 16, 2012	Haleakala	Pan-STARRS 1	·	2.1 km	MPC · JPL
738216	2016 KG_{3}	—	June 30, 2010	WISE	WISE	T_{j} (2.96)	3.3 km	MPC · JPL
738217	2016 KJ_{3}	—	April 29, 2003	Haleakala	NEAT	·	1.6 km	MPC · JPL
738218	2016 KE_{6}	—	September 19, 2001	Apache Point	SDSS Collaboration	·	3.6 km	MPC · JPL
738219	2016 KU_{11}	—	May 30, 2016	Haleakala	Pan-STARRS 1	·	1.1 km	MPC · JPL
738220	2016 KZ_{11}	—	May 30, 2016	Haleakala	Pan-STARRS 1	·	800 m	MPC · JPL
738221	2016 LZ_{3}	—	May 2, 2010	WISE	WISE	·	3.0 km	MPC · JPL
738222	2016 LS_{4}	—	June 10, 2012	Haleakala	Pan-STARRS 1	·	1.4 km	MPC · JPL
738223	2016 LQ_{6}	—	May 7, 2005	Kitt Peak	Spacewatch	·	1.2 km	MPC · JPL
738224	2016 LV_{6}	—	November 12, 2001	Apache Point	SDSS Collaboration	·	2.9 km	MPC · JPL
738225	2016 LA_{13}	—	December 16, 2007	Lulin	LUSS	EOS	1.9 km	MPC · JPL
738226	2016 LR_{13}	—	April 15, 2004	Apache Point	SDSS Collaboration	·	3.5 km	MPC · JPL
738227	2016 LJ_{16}	—	January 21, 2010	WISE	WISE	·	3.0 km	MPC · JPL
738228	2016 LN_{21}	—	June 4, 2010	WISE	WISE	·	2.8 km	MPC · JPL
738229	2016 LU_{21}	—	February 1, 2012	Mount Lemmon	Mount Lemmon Survey	·	510 m	MPC · JPL
738230	2016 LW_{25}	—	May 30, 2016	Haleakala	Pan-STARRS 1	V	520 m	MPC · JPL
738231	2016 LY_{25}	—	March 11, 2005	Mount Lemmon	Mount Lemmon Survey	·	4.0 km	MPC · JPL
738232	2016 LA_{26}	—	April 13, 2015	Haleakala	Pan-STARRS 1	L4	6.8 km	MPC · JPL
738233	2016 LU_{29}	—	May 16, 2010	WISE	WISE	·	2.1 km	MPC · JPL
738234	2016 LP_{33}	—	July 25, 2010	WISE	WISE	·	2.4 km	MPC · JPL
738235	2016 LJ_{35}	—	June 5, 2016	Haleakala	Pan-STARRS 1	·	1.0 km	MPC · JPL
738236	2016 LB_{37}	—	September 19, 2010	Kitt Peak	Spacewatch	·	660 m	MPC · JPL
738237	2016 LZ_{37}	—	November 9, 2013	Haleakala	Pan-STARRS 1	TIR	2.4 km	MPC · JPL
738238	2016 LQ_{43}	—	December 1, 2008	Kitt Peak	Spacewatch	EOS	1.5 km	MPC · JPL
738239	2016 LL_{46}	—	November 2, 2007	Kitt Peak	Spacewatch	URS	2.8 km	MPC · JPL
738240	2016 LG_{48}	—	May 21, 2010	WISE	WISE	T_{j} (2.99)	4.4 km	MPC · JPL
738241	2016 LH_{60}	—	February 25, 2015	Haleakala	Pan-STARRS 1	MAR	910 m	MPC · JPL
738242	2016 LL_{60}	—	June 5, 2016	Haleakala	Pan-STARRS 1	PHO	820 m	MPC · JPL
738243	2016 LW_{65}	—	March 25, 2012	Kitt Peak	Spacewatch	NYS	1.0 km	MPC · JPL
738244	2016 LO_{66}	—	February 26, 2004	Kitt Peak	Deep Ecliptic Survey	TIR	2.3 km	MPC · JPL
738245	2016 LP_{66}	—	January 23, 2010	WISE	WISE	EUP	3.4 km	MPC · JPL
738246	2016 LC_{67}	—	September 20, 1995	Kitt Peak	Spacewatch	·	2.9 km	MPC · JPL
738247	2016 LM_{96}	—	June 7, 2016	Haleakala	Pan-STARRS 1	·	1.6 km	MPC · JPL
738248	2016 LB_{97}	—	June 2, 2016	Kitt Peak	Spacewatch	·	2.2 km	MPC · JPL
738249	2016 MH_{2}	—	May 19, 2010	Mount Lemmon	Mount Lemmon Survey	·	2.2 km	MPC · JPL
738250	2016 MU_{2}	—	December 1, 2005	Kitt Peak	Spacewatch	ADE	1.9 km	MPC · JPL
738251	2016 NK_{2}	—	July 25, 2010	WISE	WISE	(22805)	3.8 km	MPC · JPL
738252	2016 NR_{2}	—	January 27, 2010	WISE	WISE	·	2.7 km	MPC · JPL
738253	2016 NT_{4}	—	August 31, 2011	Haleakala	Pan-STARRS 1	·	2.6 km	MPC · JPL
738254	2016 NG_{5}	—	October 10, 2001	Palomar	NEAT	·	1.7 km	MPC · JPL
738255	2016 NB_{10}	—	May 12, 2012	Haleakala	Pan-STARRS 1	NYS	920 m	MPC · JPL
738256	2016 NO_{11}	—	October 15, 2001	Palomar	NEAT	EOS	2.7 km	MPC · JPL
738257	2016 NU_{11}	—	October 13, 2013	Mount Lemmon	Mount Lemmon Survey	·	580 m	MPC · JPL
738258	2016 NV_{11}	—	September 20, 2011	Kitt Peak	Spacewatch	·	2.2 km	MPC · JPL
738259	2016 NF_{17}	—	March 22, 2010	WISE	WISE	·	3.7 km	MPC · JPL
738260	2016 NM_{18}	—	March 23, 2010	WISE	WISE	T_{j} (2.97) · EUP	3.8 km	MPC · JPL
738261	2016 NG_{19}	—	April 8, 2010	WISE	WISE	·	3.0 km	MPC · JPL
738262	2016 NJ_{20}	—	May 16, 2009	Mount Lemmon	Mount Lemmon Survey	·	620 m	MPC · JPL
738263	2016 NL_{20}	—	February 27, 2009	Mount Lemmon	Mount Lemmon Survey	·	540 m	MPC · JPL
738264	2016 NZ_{20}	—	April 10, 2010	WISE	WISE	·	3.6 km	MPC · JPL
738265	2016 NT_{25}	—	December 10, 2014	Haleakala	Pan-STARRS 1	PHO	1.1 km	MPC · JPL
738266	2016 NC_{26}	—	March 13, 2010	WISE	WISE	·	970 m	MPC · JPL
738267	2016 NB_{29}	—	March 31, 2010	WISE	WISE	·	3.1 km	MPC · JPL
738268	2016 NU_{29}	—	February 12, 2010	WISE	WISE	·	3.6 km	MPC · JPL
738269	2016 NK_{31}	—	May 2, 2010	WISE	WISE	·	3.9 km	MPC · JPL
738270	2016 NW_{34}	—	October 25, 2001	Palomar	NEAT	·	1.0 km	MPC · JPL
738271	2016 NP_{37}	—	January 27, 2007	Catalina	CSS	H	540 m	MPC · JPL
738272	2016 NS_{37}	—	March 23, 2003	Apache Point	SDSS Collaboration	·	3.4 km	MPC · JPL
738273	2016 ND_{41}	—	September 16, 2004	Roque de los Muchachos	Nordic Near-Earth Object Network	·	830 m	MPC · JPL
738274	2016 NK_{42}	—	May 10, 2012	Siding Spring	SSS	·	840 m	MPC · JPL
738275	2016 NQ_{45}	—	January 21, 2015	Haleakala	Pan-STARRS 1	·	1.1 km	MPC · JPL
738276	2016 NK_{47}	—	October 7, 2005	Catalina	CSS	·	3.2 km	MPC · JPL
738277	2016 NH_{48}	—	November 27, 2013	Haleakala	Pan-STARRS 1	·	900 m	MPC · JPL
738278	2016 NY_{48}	—	August 17, 2012	Haleakala	Pan-STARRS 1	·	1.2 km	MPC · JPL
738279	2016 NH_{50}	—	January 17, 2009	Kitt Peak	Spacewatch	·	3.5 km	MPC · JPL
738280	2016 NA_{53}	—	March 18, 2010	Kitt Peak	Spacewatch	·	1.9 km	MPC · JPL
738281	2016 NA_{57}	—	January 19, 2012	Catalina	CSS	H	610 m	MPC · JPL
738282	2016 NT_{68}	—	August 11, 2002	Palomar	NEAT	·	1.8 km	MPC · JPL
738283	2016 NO_{69}	—	April 1, 2010	WISE	WISE	·	3.7 km	MPC · JPL
738284	2016 ND_{70}	—	March 31, 2009	Kitt Peak	Spacewatch	HYG	3.2 km	MPC · JPL
738285	2016 NS_{70}	—	July 14, 2016	Haleakala	Pan-STARRS 1	·	2.5 km	MPC · JPL
738286	2016 NA_{72}	—	September 15, 2012	Catalina	CSS	·	1.1 km	MPC · JPL
738287	2016 NS_{72}	—	October 1, 2009	Mount Lemmon	Mount Lemmon Survey	V	540 m	MPC · JPL
738288	2016 NJ_{80}	—	July 7, 2016	Haleakala	Pan-STARRS 1	·	1.5 km	MPC · JPL
738289	2016 NV_{83}	—	July 11, 2016	Haleakala	Pan-STARRS 1	·	1.8 km	MPC · JPL
738290	2016 NO_{88}	—	March 27, 2015	Kitt Peak	Spacewatch	·	1.6 km	MPC · JPL
738291	2016 NT_{89}	—	September 6, 2008	Kitt Peak	Spacewatch	·	780 m	MPC · JPL
738292	2016 ND_{107}	—	July 13, 2016	Haleakala	Pan-STARRS 1	EOS	1.4 km	MPC · JPL
738293	2016 NJ_{108}	—	July 31, 2000	Cerro Tololo	Deep Ecliptic Survey	·	2.4 km	MPC · JPL
738294	2016 NP_{108}	—	July 5, 2016	Mount Lemmon	Mount Lemmon Survey	·	2.2 km	MPC · JPL
738295	2016 NS_{108}	—	January 3, 2014	Mount Lemmon	Mount Lemmon Survey	·	1.2 km	MPC · JPL
738296	2016 NG_{119}	—	July 4, 2016	Haleakala	Pan-STARRS 1	·	1.0 km	MPC · JPL
738297	2016 NH_{119}	—	December 7, 2005	Kitt Peak	Spacewatch	·	990 m	MPC · JPL
738298	2016 NB_{123}	—	July 5, 2016	Haleakala	Pan-STARRS 1	ELF	2.9 km	MPC · JPL
738299	2016 NP_{125}	—	July 13, 2016	Haleakala	Pan-STARRS 1	·	960 m	MPC · JPL
738300	2016 NA_{165}	—	July 11, 2016	Haleakala	Pan-STARRS 1	·	590 m	MPC · JPL

== 738301–738400 ==
back to top

Designation			Discovery			Properties		Ref
Permanent	Provisional	Named after	Date	Site	Discoverer(s)	Category	Diam.	Ref
738301	2016 NA_{167}	—	July 14, 2016	Haleakala	Pan-STARRS 1	·	2.5 km	MPC · JPL
738302	2016 OA_{2}	—	November 26, 2013	Mount Lemmon	Mount Lemmon Survey	(2076)	810 m	MPC · JPL
738303	2016 OO_{2}	—	April 2, 2010	WISE	WISE	T_{j} (2.95)	3.5 km	MPC · JPL
738304	2016 OH_{6}	—	September 20, 2011	Kitt Peak	Spacewatch	·	2.1 km	MPC · JPL
738305	2016 OV_{6}	—	January 3, 2013	Mount Lemmon	Mount Lemmon Survey	·	1.7 km	MPC · JPL
738306	2016 PJ_{2}	—	November 3, 2000	Kitt Peak	Spacewatch	(895)	4.0 km	MPC · JPL
738307	2016 PL_{5}	—	April 29, 2010	WISE	WISE	·	2.9 km	MPC · JPL
738308	2016 PZ_{5}	—	April 13, 2004	Kitt Peak	Spacewatch	·	3.0 km	MPC · JPL
738309	2016 PD_{10}	—	March 6, 2008	Mount Lemmon	Mount Lemmon Survey	·	2.5 km	MPC · JPL
738310	2016 PV_{13}	—	April 23, 2015	Haleakala	Pan-STARRS 1	·	2.7 km	MPC · JPL
738311	2016 PC_{15}	—	December 31, 2007	Mount Lemmon	Mount Lemmon Survey	·	3.3 km	MPC · JPL
738312	2016 PD_{18}	—	July 4, 2016	Haleakala	Pan-STARRS 1	·	1.1 km	MPC · JPL
738313	2016 PV_{23}	—	December 30, 2013	Kitt Peak	Spacewatch	(5)	820 m	MPC · JPL
738314	2016 PW_{24}	—	July 5, 2016	Haleakala	Pan-STARRS 1	V	590 m	MPC · JPL
738315	2016 PN_{25}	—	August 2, 2016	Haleakala	Pan-STARRS 1	·	1.5 km	MPC · JPL
738316	2016 PW_{30}	—	September 30, 2006	Mount Lemmon	Mount Lemmon Survey	EOS	1.7 km	MPC · JPL
738317	2016 PB_{31}	—	April 11, 2002	Palomar	NEAT	·	2.1 km	MPC · JPL
738318	2016 PR_{31}	—	December 23, 2012	Haleakala	Pan-STARRS 1	·	2.8 km	MPC · JPL
738319	2016 PV_{31}	—	April 30, 2011	Mount Lemmon	Mount Lemmon Survey	·	1.3 km	MPC · JPL
738320	2016 PY_{36}	—	March 22, 2015	Mount Lemmon	Mount Lemmon Survey	PHO	830 m	MPC · JPL
738321	2016 PN_{37}	—	July 4, 2016	Haleakala	Pan-STARRS 1	EOS	1.3 km	MPC · JPL
738322	2016 PP_{41}	—	January 23, 2015	Haleakala	Pan-STARRS 1	·	1.1 km	MPC · JPL
738323	2016 PA_{42}	—	May 11, 2008	Mount Lemmon	Mount Lemmon Survey	·	950 m	MPC · JPL
738324	2016 PU_{42}	—	September 4, 2011	Haleakala	Pan-STARRS 1	·	2.7 km	MPC · JPL
738325	2016 PZ_{44}	—	September 18, 2011	Mount Lemmon	Mount Lemmon Survey	·	2.4 km	MPC · JPL
738326	2016 PS_{49}	—	September 28, 1997	Kitt Peak	Spacewatch	SYL	4.7 km	MPC · JPL
738327	2016 PH_{56}	—	April 10, 2010	WISE	WISE	EOS	1.7 km	MPC · JPL
738328	2016 PQ_{56}	—	August 7, 2016	Haleakala	Pan-STARRS 1	·	910 m	MPC · JPL
738329	2016 PY_{58}	—	April 13, 2010	WISE	WISE	·	2.6 km	MPC · JPL
738330	2016 PG_{68}	—	August 24, 2005	Palomar	NEAT	·	3.5 km	MPC · JPL
738331	2016 PU_{69}	—	November 10, 2013	Kitt Peak	Spacewatch	V	460 m	MPC · JPL
738332	2016 PP_{71}	—	August 6, 2016	Haleakala	Pan-STARRS 1	EOS	1.3 km	MPC · JPL
738333	2016 PZ_{78}	—	July 12, 2005	Mount Lemmon	Mount Lemmon Survey	EMA	3.3 km	MPC · JPL
738334	2016 PC_{79}	—	January 5, 2003	Kitt Peak	Spacewatch	·	4.7 km	MPC · JPL
738335	2016 PU_{81}	—	June 2, 2003	Kitt Peak	Spacewatch	·	5.0 km	MPC · JPL
738336	2016 PZ_{81}	—	August 2, 2016	Haleakala	Pan-STARRS 1	·	3.1 km	MPC · JPL
738337	2016 PV_{89}	—	December 30, 2013	Haleakala	Pan-STARRS 1	·	830 m	MPC · JPL
738338	2016 PP_{93}	—	September 14, 2007	Mount Lemmon	Mount Lemmon Survey	·	1.5 km	MPC · JPL
738339	2016 PX_{98}	—	March 30, 2010	WISE	WISE	·	2.4 km	MPC · JPL
738340	2016 PK_{100}	—	November 28, 2013	Mount Lemmon	Mount Lemmon Survey	·	1.1 km	MPC · JPL
738341	2016 PL_{100}	—	September 16, 2012	Catalina	CSS	ADE	1.5 km	MPC · JPL
738342	2016 PF_{103}	—	August 10, 2016	Haleakala	Pan-STARRS 1	·	1.5 km	MPC · JPL
738343	2016 PT_{106}	—	August 2, 2016	Haleakala	Pan-STARRS 1	·	1.8 km	MPC · JPL
738344	2016 PJ_{110}	—	April 26, 2010	WISE	WISE	·	2.5 km	MPC · JPL
738345	2016 PT_{110}	—	March 17, 2015	Haleakala	Pan-STARRS 1	·	570 m	MPC · JPL
738346	2016 PK_{114}	—	October 31, 2008	Kitt Peak	Spacewatch	·	990 m	MPC · JPL
738347	2016 PT_{114}	—	January 18, 2004	Kitt Peak	Spacewatch	·	2.0 km	MPC · JPL
738348	2016 PE_{115}	—	August 28, 2005	Kitt Peak	Spacewatch	V	510 m	MPC · JPL
738349	2016 PH_{115}	—	September 20, 2011	Haleakala	Pan-STARRS 1	ELF	2.8 km	MPC · JPL
738350	2016 PL_{117}	—	August 3, 2016	Haleakala	Pan-STARRS 1	·	970 m	MPC · JPL
738351	2016 PM_{117}	—	January 10, 2014	Kitt Peak	Spacewatch	·	820 m	MPC · JPL
738352	2016 PH_{119}	—	February 10, 2014	Haleakala	Pan-STARRS 1	KON	1.9 km	MPC · JPL
738353	2016 PP_{122}	—	September 22, 2003	Kitt Peak	Spacewatch	·	1.1 km	MPC · JPL
738354	2016 PF_{125}	—	August 12, 2016	Haleakala	Pan-STARRS 1	·	1.3 km	MPC · JPL
738355	2016 PP_{125}	—	August 26, 2012	Haleakala	Pan-STARRS 1	·	890 m	MPC · JPL
738356	2016 PG_{128}	—	October 16, 2009	Mount Lemmon	Mount Lemmon Survey	·	880 m	MPC · JPL
738357	2016 PS_{130}	—	September 5, 1999	Kitt Peak	Spacewatch	·	3.5 km	MPC · JPL
738358	2016 PP_{152}	—	August 3, 2016	Haleakala	Pan-STARRS 1	·	1.6 km	MPC · JPL
738359	2016 PR_{152}	—	August 4, 2016	Haleakala	Pan-STARRS 1	·	1.3 km	MPC · JPL
738360	2016 PY_{152}	—	August 1, 2016	Haleakala	Pan-STARRS 1	·	730 m	MPC · JPL
738361	2016 PG_{158}	—	August 14, 2016	Haleakala	Pan-STARRS 1	·	1.9 km	MPC · JPL
738362	2016 PB_{161}	—	August 15, 2016	Haleakala	Pan-STARRS 1	·	1.4 km	MPC · JPL
738363	2016 PS_{164}	—	August 10, 2016	Haleakala	Pan-STARRS 1	·	1.3 km	MPC · JPL
738364	2016 PA_{167}	—	August 8, 2016	Haleakala	Pan-STARRS 1	·	980 m	MPC · JPL
738365	2016 PL_{167}	—	August 14, 2016	Haleakala	Pan-STARRS 1	HNS	940 m	MPC · JPL
738366	2016 PD_{178}	—	August 14, 2016	Haleakala	Pan-STARRS 1	·	910 m	MPC · JPL
738367	2016 PF_{179}	—	August 7, 2016	Haleakala	Pan-STARRS 1	EUN	750 m	MPC · JPL
738368	2016 PE_{182}	—	August 8, 2016	Haleakala	Pan-STARRS 1	·	850 m	MPC · JPL
738369	2016 PS_{203}	—	August 7, 2016	Haleakala	Pan-STARRS 1	·	1.4 km	MPC · JPL
738370	2016 PL_{208}	—	August 14, 2016	Haleakala	Pan-STARRS 1	·	2.5 km	MPC · JPL
738371	2016 PF_{224}	—	January 31, 2009	Kitt Peak	Spacewatch	·	1.6 km	MPC · JPL
738372	2016 PL_{239}	—	August 7, 2016	Haleakala	Pan-STARRS 1	·	1.8 km	MPC · JPL
738373	2016 PN_{243}	—	August 2, 2016	Haleakala	Pan-STARRS 1	EOS	1.3 km	MPC · JPL
738374	2016 QA_{1}	—	January 14, 2002	Socorro	LINEAR	EUN	1.1 km	MPC · JPL
738375	2016 QJ_{2}	—	January 5, 2006	Kitt Peak	Spacewatch	·	740 m	MPC · JPL
738376	2016 QP_{4}	—	August 28, 2006	Kitt Peak	Spacewatch	·	1.4 km	MPC · JPL
738377	2016 QY_{4}	—	July 29, 2008	Mount Lemmon	Mount Lemmon Survey	·	870 m	MPC · JPL
738378	2016 QC_{7}	—	January 12, 2008	Kitt Peak	Spacewatch	EOS	1.6 km	MPC · JPL
738379	2016 QC_{10}	—	April 28, 2010	WISE	WISE	LUT	4.2 km	MPC · JPL
738380	2016 QC_{12}	—	January 22, 2015	Haleakala	Pan-STARRS 1	PHO	840 m	MPC · JPL
738381	2016 QB_{16}	—	May 11, 2010	Kitt Peak	Spacewatch	·	2.5 km	MPC · JPL
738382	2016 QL_{16}	—	September 14, 2012	ESA OGS	ESA OGS	·	990 m	MPC · JPL
738383	2016 QW_{19}	—	August 26, 2016	Haleakala	Pan-STARRS 1	·	2.0 km	MPC · JPL
738384	2016 QW_{21}	—	May 26, 2015	Haleakala	Pan-STARRS 1	EUN	1.1 km	MPC · JPL
738385	2016 QH_{23}	—	August 14, 2016	Haleakala	Pan-STARRS 1	V	460 m	MPC · JPL
738386	2016 QH_{24}	—	August 26, 2016	Haleakala	Pan-STARRS 1	EOS	1.5 km	MPC · JPL
738387	2016 QM_{24}	—	April 23, 2010	WISE	WISE	·	3.2 km	MPC · JPL
738388	2016 QP_{26}	—	May 6, 2010	WISE	WISE	·	1.7 km	MPC · JPL
738389	2016 QX_{29}	—	July 18, 2006	Mount Lemmon	Mount Lemmon Survey	·	2.2 km	MPC · JPL
738390	2016 QZ_{30}	—	January 30, 2008	Mount Lemmon	Mount Lemmon Survey	·	1.4 km	MPC · JPL
738391	2016 QP_{34}	—	August 14, 2012	Siding Spring	SSS	·	1.7 km	MPC · JPL
738392	2016 QQ_{35}	—	February 24, 2008	Mount Lemmon	Mount Lemmon Survey	·	3.1 km	MPC · JPL
738393	2016 QF_{41}	—	January 22, 2013	Kitt Peak	Spacewatch	VER	2.3 km	MPC · JPL
738394	2016 QP_{41}	—	September 19, 2012	Mount Lemmon	Mount Lemmon Survey	·	1.3 km	MPC · JPL
738395	2016 QS_{50}	—	August 15, 2009	Kitt Peak	Spacewatch	·	740 m	MPC · JPL
738396	2016 QT_{50}	—	August 3, 2016	Haleakala	Pan-STARRS 1	·	1.1 km	MPC · JPL
738397	2016 QV_{50}	—	November 26, 2003	Kitt Peak	Spacewatch	·	570 m	MPC · JPL
738398	2016 QK_{51}	—	April 9, 2010	WISE	WISE	·	2.9 km	MPC · JPL
738399	2016 QR_{52}	—	May 11, 2015	Mount Lemmon	Mount Lemmon Survey	·	2.4 km	MPC · JPL
738400	2016 QR_{55}	—	November 20, 2006	Kitt Peak	Spacewatch	·	990 m	MPC · JPL

== 738401–738500 ==
back to top

Designation			Discovery			Properties		Ref
Permanent	Provisional	Named after	Date	Site	Discoverer(s)	Category	Diam.	Ref
738401	2016 QG_{59}	—	August 29, 2016	Mount Lemmon	Mount Lemmon Survey	·	990 m	MPC · JPL
738402	2016 QE_{63}	—	October 22, 2012	Haleakala	Pan-STARRS 1	AGN	900 m	MPC · JPL
738403	2016 QM_{67}	—	October 11, 2005	Kitt Peak	Spacewatch	·	970 m	MPC · JPL
738404	2016 QB_{70}	—	February 5, 2006	Mount Lemmon	Mount Lemmon Survey	·	1.2 km	MPC · JPL
738405	2016 QH_{74}	—	July 14, 2004	Siding Spring	SSS	·	5.2 km	MPC · JPL
738406	2016 QR_{74}	—	April 2, 2010	WISE	WISE	EMA	2.8 km	MPC · JPL
738407	2016 QF_{77}	—	September 27, 2006	Mount Lemmon	Mount Lemmon Survey	·	3.1 km	MPC · JPL
738408	2016 QY_{77}	—	September 29, 2005	Catalina	CSS	·	3.1 km	MPC · JPL
738409	2016 QK_{80}	—	June 4, 2006	Mount Lemmon	Mount Lemmon Survey	BRA	2.3 km	MPC · JPL
738410	2016 QS_{80}	—	August 30, 2005	Palomar	NEAT	·	3.2 km	MPC · JPL
738411	2016 QZ_{87}	—	November 1, 2005	Mount Lemmon	Mount Lemmon Survey	ELF	2.8 km	MPC · JPL
738412	2016 QU_{90}	—	August 31, 2005	Palomar	NEAT	·	4.0 km	MPC · JPL
738413	2016 QK_{91}	—	November 23, 2011	Mayhill-ISON	L. Elenin	·	2.4 km	MPC · JPL
738414	2016 QR_{93}	—	August 31, 2005	Kitt Peak	Spacewatch	·	2.2 km	MPC · JPL
738415	2016 QG_{104}	—	August 26, 2016	Mount Lemmon	Mount Lemmon Survey	THM	1.9 km	MPC · JPL
738416	2016 QK_{104}	—	August 14, 2012	Haleakala	Pan-STARRS 1	·	1.2 km	MPC · JPL
738417	2016 QA_{106}	—	August 30, 2016	Mount Lemmon	Mount Lemmon Survey	·	1.5 km	MPC · JPL
738418	2016 QC_{106}	—	August 30, 2016	Haleakala	Pan-STARRS 1	·	2.7 km	MPC · JPL
738419	2016 QR_{106}	—	August 27, 2016	Haleakala	Pan-STARRS 1	·	2.1 km	MPC · JPL
738420	2016 QD_{115}	—	August 26, 2016	Haleakala	Pan-STARRS 1	·	920 m	MPC · JPL
738421	2016 RM_{4}	—	March 13, 2010	WISE	WISE	·	1.2 km	MPC · JPL
738422	2016 RY_{5}	—	May 4, 2009	Mount Lemmon	Mount Lemmon Survey	·	2.4 km	MPC · JPL
738423	2016 RJ_{8}	—	October 25, 2013	Mount Lemmon	Mount Lemmon Survey	·	880 m	MPC · JPL
738424	2016 RB_{10}	—	February 18, 2010	WISE	WISE	·	1.6 km	MPC · JPL
738425	2016 RB_{15}	—	February 25, 2015	Haleakala	Pan-STARRS 1	·	560 m	MPC · JPL
738426	2016 RN_{16}	—	July 11, 2005	Kitt Peak	Spacewatch	·	2.5 km	MPC · JPL
738427	2016 RH_{21}	—	August 4, 2005	Palomar	NEAT	EMA	3.1 km	MPC · JPL
738428	2016 RN_{24}	—	September 17, 2012	Mount Lemmon	Mount Lemmon Survey	HNS	730 m	MPC · JPL
738429	2016 RL_{31}	—	June 26, 2011	Mount Lemmon	Mount Lemmon Survey	·	2.5 km	MPC · JPL
738430	2016 RD_{37}	—	October 4, 2003	Kitt Peak	Spacewatch	·	3.7 km	MPC · JPL
738431	2016 RU_{38}	—	April 21, 2006	Catalina	CSS	·	1.5 km	MPC · JPL
738432	2016 RZ_{39}	—	October 8, 2005	Catalina	CSS	·	2.3 km	MPC · JPL
738433	2016 RR_{41}	—	June 12, 2010	WISE	WISE	T_{j} (2.99)	3.3 km	MPC · JPL
738434	2016 RY_{45}	—	May 17, 2010	WISE	WISE	·	3.0 km	MPC · JPL
738435	2016 RG_{47}	—	October 16, 1999	Apache Point	SDSS	(5)	1.2 km	MPC · JPL
738436	2016 RJ_{47}	—	October 29, 2008	Kitt Peak	Spacewatch	·	1.0 km	MPC · JPL
738437	2016 RK_{50}	—	August 27, 2006	Kitt Peak	Spacewatch	·	1.8 km	MPC · JPL
738438	2016 RN_{58}	—	April 18, 2010	WISE	WISE	EMA	2.6 km	MPC · JPL
738439	2016 RW_{60}	—	September 6, 2016	Mount Lemmon	Mount Lemmon Survey	·	2.4 km	MPC · JPL
738440	2016 RK_{67}	—	September 10, 2016	Mount Lemmon	Mount Lemmon Survey	NYS	970 m	MPC · JPL
738441	2016 RZ_{89}	—	September 12, 2016	Haleakala	Pan-STARRS 1	·	660 m	MPC · JPL
738442	2016 SG_{1}	—	September 24, 2016	Kitt Peak	Spacewatch	APO +1km	2.7 km	MPC · JPL
738443	2016 SR_{5}	—	June 1, 2010	WISE	WISE	·	3.0 km	MPC · JPL
738444	2016 SK_{6}	—	April 10, 2010	WISE	WISE	·	3.1 km	MPC · JPL
738445	2016 SZ_{6}	—	January 22, 2015	Haleakala	Pan-STARRS 1	·	810 m	MPC · JPL
738446	2016 SP_{7}	—	May 27, 2010	WISE	WISE	·	4.5 km	MPC · JPL
738447	2016 SQ_{7}	—	November 1, 2006	Mount Lemmon	Mount Lemmon Survey	·	2.7 km	MPC · JPL
738448	2016 SC_{12}	—	February 18, 2002	Cerro Tololo	Deep Lens Survey	·	3.3 km	MPC · JPL
738449	2016 SM_{16}	—	August 29, 2005	Palomar	NEAT	·	3.9 km	MPC · JPL
738450	2016 SL_{17}	—	August 28, 2016	Mount Lemmon	Mount Lemmon Survey	·	680 m	MPC · JPL
738451	2016 SS_{19}	—	October 14, 2012	Kitt Peak	Spacewatch	·	1.1 km	MPC · JPL
738452	2016 SA_{23}	—	October 13, 2001	Socorro	LINEAR	PHO	1.0 km	MPC · JPL
738453	2016 SE_{25}	—	September 10, 2007	Kitt Peak	Spacewatch	·	2.1 km	MPC · JPL
738454	2016 SY_{30}	—	October 22, 2003	Apache Point	SDSS Collaboration	·	1.8 km	MPC · JPL
738455	2016 SG_{31}	—	August 9, 2004	Siding Spring	SSS	·	2.0 km	MPC · JPL
738456	2016 SR_{31}	—	May 9, 2010	WISE	WISE	·	2.2 km	MPC · JPL
738457	2016 SB_{33}	—	February 28, 2008	Kitt Peak	Spacewatch	·	3.1 km	MPC · JPL
738458	2016 SW_{39}	—	September 23, 2005	Kitt Peak	Spacewatch	VER	2.7 km	MPC · JPL
738459	2016 SP_{43}	—	April 11, 2010	Mount Lemmon	Mount Lemmon Survey	·	2.3 km	MPC · JPL
738460	2016 SY_{48}	—	June 13, 2010	WISE	WISE	EUP	3.9 km	MPC · JPL
738461	2016 SV_{49}	—	October 9, 2007	Mount Lemmon	Mount Lemmon Survey	·	1.4 km	MPC · JPL
738462	2016 SV_{50}	—	October 18, 2012	Haleakala	Pan-STARRS 1	·	910 m	MPC · JPL
738463	2016 SJ_{55}	—	September 30, 2016	Haleakala	Pan-STARRS 1	·	2.2 km	MPC · JPL
738464	2016 SB_{76}	—	September 26, 2016	Haleakala	Pan-STARRS 1	WIT	720 m	MPC · JPL
738465	2016 SD_{80}	—	September 27, 2016	Haleakala	Pan-STARRS 1	·	1.3 km	MPC · JPL
738466	2016 SJ_{85}	—	September 25, 2016	Haleakala	Pan-STARRS 1	·	910 m	MPC · JPL
738467	2016 SK_{85}	—	September 25, 2016	Haleakala	Pan-STARRS 1	KON	1.6 km	MPC · JPL
738468	2016 TJ_{2}	—	August 23, 2003	Palomar	NEAT	·	580 m	MPC · JPL
738469	2016 TD_{3}	—	May 29, 2010	WISE	WISE	·	2.5 km	MPC · JPL
738470	2016 TX_{3}	—	September 14, 2007	Mount Lemmon	Mount Lemmon Survey	·	1.8 km	MPC · JPL
738471	2016 TN_{4}	—	February 27, 2015	Haleakala	Pan-STARRS 1	V	490 m	MPC · JPL
738472	2016 TR_{6}	—	August 27, 2005	Palomar	NEAT	·	3.4 km	MPC · JPL
738473	2016 TZ_{12}	—	November 1, 2002	Palomar	NEAT	·	2.5 km	MPC · JPL
738474	2016 TQ_{14}	—	May 29, 2010	WISE	WISE	·	3.4 km	MPC · JPL
738475	2016 TU_{20}	—	April 28, 2010	WISE	WISE	·	2.2 km	MPC · JPL
738476	2016 TB_{22}	—	May 1, 2011	Haleakala	Pan-STARRS 1	EUN	1.0 km	MPC · JPL
738477	2016 TL_{22}	—	February 13, 2002	Apache Point	SDSS Collaboration	·	3.2 km	MPC · JPL
738478	2016 TA_{23}	—	May 19, 2005	Mount Lemmon	Mount Lemmon Survey	·	2.4 km	MPC · JPL
738479	2016 TM_{28}	—	October 12, 2005	Kitt Peak	Spacewatch	·	2.8 km	MPC · JPL
738480	2016 TX_{30}	—	July 7, 2010	WISE	WISE	·	3.4 km	MPC · JPL
738481	2016 TN_{31}	—	February 28, 2008	Kitt Peak	Spacewatch	EOS	2.0 km	MPC · JPL
738482	2016 TE_{32}	—	August 30, 2005	Palomar	NEAT	LIX	4.4 km	MPC · JPL
738483	2016 TH_{35}	—	August 29, 2005	Palomar	NEAT	·	940 m	MPC · JPL
738484	2016 TM_{36}	—	January 29, 2014	Kitt Peak	Spacewatch	·	1.1 km	MPC · JPL
738485	2016 TW_{36}	—	September 14, 2005	Kitt Peak	Spacewatch	·	2.3 km	MPC · JPL
738486	2016 TH_{38}	—	May 3, 2010	WISE	WISE	·	2.1 km	MPC · JPL
738487	2016 TA_{40}	—	August 10, 2016	Haleakala	Pan-STARRS 1	·	2.9 km	MPC · JPL
738488	2016 TY_{40}	—	August 10, 2016	Haleakala	Pan-STARRS 1	·	870 m	MPC · JPL
738489	2016 TO_{42}	—	October 6, 2004	Kitt Peak	Spacewatch	·	790 m	MPC · JPL
738490	2016 TS_{45}	—	August 29, 2016	Mount Lemmon	Mount Lemmon Survey	·	1.8 km	MPC · JPL
738491	2016 TU_{45}	—	February 5, 2005	Palomar	NEAT	ADE	3.5 km	MPC · JPL
738492	2016 TM_{47}	—	July 27, 2010	WISE	WISE	·	3.3 km	MPC · JPL
738493	2016 TP_{58}	—	September 9, 2016	Kitt Peak	Spacewatch	·	1.4 km	MPC · JPL
738494	2016 TE_{60}	—	October 5, 2012	Kitt Peak	Spacewatch	MAR	700 m	MPC · JPL
738495	2016 TU_{62}	—	September 2, 2016	Mount Lemmon	Mount Lemmon Survey	·	1.1 km	MPC · JPL
738496	2016 TJ_{63}	—	August 28, 2009	Kitt Peak	Spacewatch	·	500 m	MPC · JPL
738497	2016 TC_{65}	—	May 19, 2010	WISE	WISE	·	2.8 km	MPC · JPL
738498	2016 TV_{65}	—	March 11, 2005	Mount Lemmon	Mount Lemmon Survey	·	2.1 km	MPC · JPL
738499	2016 TT_{67}	—	August 29, 2005	Palomar	NEAT	·	2.6 km	MPC · JPL
738500	2016 TK_{69}	—	September 4, 2007	Mount Lemmon	Mount Lemmon Survey	·	1.4 km	MPC · JPL

== 738501–738600 ==
back to top

Designation			Discovery			Properties		Ref
Permanent	Provisional	Named after	Date	Site	Discoverer(s)	Category	Diam.	Ref
738501	2016 TV_{71}	—	November 7, 2012	Mount Lemmon	Mount Lemmon Survey	·	1.8 km	MPC · JPL
738502	2016 TP_{72}	—	March 31, 2003	Kitt Peak	Spacewatch	·	2.9 km	MPC · JPL
738503	2016 TO_{73}	—	October 14, 2009	Mount Lemmon	Mount Lemmon Survey	V	560 m	MPC · JPL
738504	2016 TP_{73}	—	February 9, 2010	WISE	WISE	·	2.0 km	MPC · JPL
738505	2016 TH_{77}	—	February 21, 2007	Mount Lemmon	Mount Lemmon Survey	·	3.3 km	MPC · JPL
738506	2016 TE_{80}	—	October 7, 2000	Kitt Peak	Spacewatch	·	2.3 km	MPC · JPL
738507	2016 TU_{80}	—	October 9, 2012	Mount Lemmon	Mount Lemmon Survey	·	1.3 km	MPC · JPL
738508	2016 TY_{80}	—	November 15, 2007	Catalina	CSS	·	2.6 km	MPC · JPL
738509	2016 TR_{81}	—	June 1, 2010	WISE	WISE	·	2.5 km	MPC · JPL
738510	2016 TA_{85}	—	June 15, 2010	WISE	WISE	LUT	3.3 km	MPC · JPL
738511	2016 TP_{85}	—	October 10, 2016	Mount Lemmon	Mount Lemmon Survey	·	1.8 km	MPC · JPL
738512	2016 TQ_{85}	—	December 4, 2008	Mount Lemmon	Mount Lemmon Survey	EUN	1.0 km	MPC · JPL
738513	2016 TP_{86}	—	June 21, 2010	WISE	WISE	·	3.1 km	MPC · JPL
738514	2016 TH_{87}	—	September 26, 2006	Kitt Peak	Spacewatch	·	680 m	MPC · JPL
738515	2016 TN_{88}	—	October 21, 2003	Kitt Peak	Spacewatch	·	1.4 km	MPC · JPL
738516	2016 TC_{90}	—	August 29, 2016	Mount Lemmon	Mount Lemmon Survey	·	1.4 km	MPC · JPL
738517	2016 TO_{90}	—	August 22, 2005	Palomar	NEAT	·	2.1 km	MPC · JPL
738518	2016 TW_{90}	—	April 4, 2008	Mount Lemmon	Mount Lemmon Survey	·	3.7 km	MPC · JPL
738519	2016 TA_{92}	—	June 9, 2010	WISE	WISE	·	5.0 km	MPC · JPL
738520	2016 TF_{92}	—	March 31, 2009	Kitt Peak	Spacewatch	·	2.6 km	MPC · JPL
738521	2016 TK_{98}	—	April 19, 2010	WISE	WISE	·	1.3 km	MPC · JPL
738522	2016 TA_{99}	—	November 24, 2011	Mount Lemmon	Mount Lemmon Survey	·	1.4 km	MPC · JPL
738523	2016 TO_{100}	—	November 8, 2007	Kitt Peak	Spacewatch	·	1.6 km	MPC · JPL
738524	2016 TR_{118}	—	June 22, 2010	Kitt Peak	Spacewatch	·	3.3 km	MPC · JPL
738525	2016 TM_{121}	—	October 13, 2016	Haleakala	Pan-STARRS 1	MAR	800 m	MPC · JPL
738526	2016 TR_{121}	—	October 4, 2016	Mount Lemmon	Mount Lemmon Survey	·	1.2 km	MPC · JPL
738527	2016 TX_{122}	—	October 4, 2016	Mount Lemmon	Mount Lemmon Survey	·	1.3 km	MPC · JPL
738528	2016 TB_{125}	—	October 2, 2016	Catalina	CSS	·	1.2 km	MPC · JPL
738529	2016 TQ_{129}	—	October 5, 2016	Mount Lemmon	Mount Lemmon Survey	·	1.1 km	MPC · JPL
738530	2016 TF_{133}	—	March 20, 2014	Mount Lemmon	Mount Lemmon Survey	·	1.4 km	MPC · JPL
738531	2016 TJ_{133}	—	October 7, 2016	Haleakala	Pan-STARRS 1	(5)	1.1 km	MPC · JPL
738532	2016 TD_{139}	—	August 24, 2007	Kitt Peak	Spacewatch	·	1.2 km	MPC · JPL
738533	2016 TC_{140}	—	October 13, 2016	Mount Lemmon	Mount Lemmon Survey	·	1.1 km	MPC · JPL
738534	2016 TO_{154}	—	October 4, 2016	Kitt Peak	Spacewatch	·	860 m	MPC · JPL
738535	2016 UJ_{1}	—	November 4, 2005	Kitt Peak	Spacewatch	·	1.3 km	MPC · JPL
738536	2016 UY_{2}	—	September 27, 2016	Haleakala	Pan-STARRS 1	·	1.5 km	MPC · JPL
738537	2016 UZ_{2}	—	September 27, 2016	Haleakala	Pan-STARRS 1	·	1.1 km	MPC · JPL
738538	2016 UA_{7}	—	May 21, 2010	WISE	WISE	·	3.2 km	MPC · JPL
738539	2016 UW_{8}	—	October 8, 2016	Mount Lemmon	Mount Lemmon Survey	·	1.3 km	MPC · JPL
738540	2016 UD_{9}	—	May 19, 2010	WISE	WISE	·	2.7 km	MPC · JPL
738541	2016 UN_{10}	—	May 8, 2010	WISE	WISE	·	2.6 km	MPC · JPL
738542	2016 UA_{16}	—	February 8, 2002	Kitt Peak	Deep Ecliptic Survey	·	1.2 km	MPC · JPL
738543	2016 UO_{16}	—	October 20, 2016	Mount Lemmon	Mount Lemmon Survey	·	1.0 km	MPC · JPL
738544	2016 UJ_{17}	—	July 14, 2001	Palomar	NEAT	·	1.4 km	MPC · JPL
738545	2016 UN_{17}	—	May 12, 2010	WISE	WISE	·	2.4 km	MPC · JPL
738546	2016 UY_{17}	—	May 29, 2010	WISE	WISE	T_{j} (2.99) · EUP	3.1 km	MPC · JPL
738547	2016 UJ_{24}	—	July 12, 2010	WISE	WISE	·	3.9 km	MPC · JPL
738548	2016 UK_{27}	—	January 1, 2009	Mount Lemmon	Mount Lemmon Survey	·	1.3 km	MPC · JPL
738549	2016 UP_{31}	—	June 22, 2010	Mount Lemmon	Mount Lemmon Survey	H	420 m	MPC · JPL
738550	2016 UJ_{32}	—	May 18, 2010	WISE	WISE	·	3.6 km	MPC · JPL
738551	2016 UX_{33}	—	October 20, 2003	Kitt Peak	Spacewatch	·	1.4 km	MPC · JPL
738552	2016 US_{38}	—	December 30, 2008	Kitt Peak	Spacewatch	·	1.3 km	MPC · JPL
738553	2016 UV_{38}	—	October 6, 2016	Mount Lemmon	Mount Lemmon Survey	·	1.1 km	MPC · JPL
738554	2016 UW_{43}	—	April 6, 2010	Catalina	CSS	EUN	1.4 km	MPC · JPL
738555	2016 UP_{44}	—	January 1, 2014	Kitt Peak	Spacewatch	·	1.1 km	MPC · JPL
738556	2016 UG_{45}	—	February 8, 2010	WISE	WISE	·	1.4 km	MPC · JPL
738557	2016 UQ_{45}	—	July 27, 2009	Catalina	CSS	·	710 m	MPC · JPL
738558	2016 UA_{47}	—	April 3, 2008	Mount Lemmon	Mount Lemmon Survey	·	3.2 km	MPC · JPL
738559	2016 UE_{47}	—	October 3, 2005	Kitt Peak	Spacewatch	·	1.0 km	MPC · JPL
738560	2016 UK_{51}	—	September 17, 2009	Kitt Peak	Spacewatch	·	640 m	MPC · JPL
738561	2016 UD_{52}	—	September 14, 2005	Kitt Peak	Spacewatch	·	1.5 km	MPC · JPL
738562	2016 UQ_{52}	—	June 28, 2010	WISE	WISE	ARM	4.3 km	MPC · JPL
738563	2016 UM_{54}	—	March 14, 2010	WISE	WISE	NYS	980 m	MPC · JPL
738564	2016 UP_{54}	—	January 3, 2008	Kitt Peak	Spacewatch	AGN	980 m	MPC · JPL
738565	2016 UZ_{57}	—	September 20, 2003	Palomar	NEAT	·	1.5 km	MPC · JPL
738566	2016 UU_{62}	—	November 10, 2005	Kitt Peak	Spacewatch	URS	3.3 km	MPC · JPL
738567	2016 UO_{64}	—	September 19, 2000	Kitt Peak	Spacewatch	·	1.9 km	MPC · JPL
738568	2016 UW_{64}	—	July 28, 2003	Palomar	NEAT	·	2.5 km	MPC · JPL
738569	2016 UB_{66}	—	November 22, 1995	Kitt Peak	Spacewatch	·	1.2 km	MPC · JPL
738570	2016 UP_{66}	—	September 26, 2011	Mount Lemmon	Mount Lemmon Survey	·	1.7 km	MPC · JPL
738571	2016 UD_{67}	—	October 21, 2012	Haleakala	Pan-STARRS 1	·	1.3 km	MPC · JPL
738572	2016 UV_{67}	—	December 12, 2012	Mount Lemmon	Mount Lemmon Survey	(5)	1.0 km	MPC · JPL
738573	2016 UP_{68}	—	October 2, 2005	Mount Lemmon	Mount Lemmon Survey	·	2.3 km	MPC · JPL
738574	2016 UD_{70}	—	October 22, 2012	Haleakala	Pan-STARRS 1	·	950 m	MPC · JPL
738575	2016 UP_{72}	—	October 25, 2005	Kitt Peak	Spacewatch	·	2.4 km	MPC · JPL
738576	2016 US_{78}	—	September 26, 2011	Haleakala	Pan-STARRS 1	·	1.8 km	MPC · JPL
738577	2016 UR_{79}	—	May 16, 2009	Mount Lemmon	Mount Lemmon Survey	EUP	3.0 km	MPC · JPL
738578	2016 UK_{80}	—	November 25, 2005	Mount Lemmon	Mount Lemmon Survey	·	2.7 km	MPC · JPL
738579	2016 UN_{81}	—	November 18, 2001	Kitt Peak	Spacewatch	NYS	930 m	MPC · JPL
738580	2016 UQ_{82}	—	October 16, 2001	Kitt Peak	Spacewatch	·	1.9 km	MPC · JPL
738581	2016 UR_{83}	—	October 21, 2016	Mount Lemmon	Mount Lemmon Survey	MAR	740 m	MPC · JPL
738582	2016 UW_{85}	—	November 4, 1999	Kitt Peak	Spacewatch	URS	3.9 km	MPC · JPL
738583	2016 UF_{86}	—	October 6, 2016	Haleakala	Pan-STARRS 1	·	1.3 km	MPC · JPL
738584	2016 UN_{88}	—	October 7, 2007	Mount Lemmon	Mount Lemmon Survey	·	2.8 km	MPC · JPL
738585	2016 UZ_{88}	—	November 12, 2001	Apache Point	SDSS Collaboration	V	590 m	MPC · JPL
738586	2016 UE_{92}	—	October 18, 2012	Haleakala	Pan-STARRS 1	(5)	800 m	MPC · JPL
738587	2016 UU_{94}	—	April 30, 2009	Mount Lemmon	Mount Lemmon Survey	·	1.7 km	MPC · JPL
738588	2016 UW_{95}	—	October 20, 2016	Mount Lemmon	Mount Lemmon Survey	·	850 m	MPC · JPL
738589	2016 UA_{96}	—	June 25, 2010	WISE	WISE	·	1.9 km	MPC · JPL
738590	2016 UR_{98}	—	May 14, 1997	Kitt Peak	Spacewatch	·	800 m	MPC · JPL
738591	2016 UT_{98}	—	February 28, 2014	Haleakala	Pan-STARRS 1	HOF	2.0 km	MPC · JPL
738592	2016 UQ_{99}	—	October 26, 2016	Haleakala	Pan-STARRS 1	·	670 m	MPC · JPL
738593	2016 UH_{100}	—	April 21, 2006	Kitt Peak	Spacewatch	·	2.1 km	MPC · JPL
738594	2016 UC_{110}	—	December 22, 2008	Kitt Peak	Spacewatch	·	1.1 km	MPC · JPL
738595	2016 UB_{111}	—	January 3, 2009	Kitt Peak	Spacewatch	·	1.1 km	MPC · JPL
738596	2016 UO_{113}	—	November 8, 2009	Mount Lemmon	Mount Lemmon Survey	V	450 m	MPC · JPL
738597	2016 US_{117}	—	March 7, 2014	Mount Lemmon	Mount Lemmon Survey	·	1.3 km	MPC · JPL
738598	2016 UJ_{118}	—	October 26, 2016	Haleakala	Pan-STARRS 1	·	1.4 km	MPC · JPL
738599	2016 UT_{122}	—	June 3, 2002	Palomar	NEAT	·	2.5 km	MPC · JPL
738600	2016 UC_{125}	—	October 6, 2005	Mount Lemmon	Mount Lemmon Survey	·	2.7 km	MPC · JPL

== 738601–738700 ==
back to top

Designation			Discovery			Properties		Ref
Permanent	Provisional	Named after	Date	Site	Discoverer(s)	Category	Diam.	Ref
738601	2016 UV_{128}	—	February 28, 2014	Haleakala	Pan-STARRS 1	·	1.1 km	MPC · JPL
738602	2016 UU_{132}	—	October 27, 2016	Haleakala	Pan-STARRS 1	·	820 m	MPC · JPL
738603	2016 UL_{136}	—	October 12, 2016	Haleakala	Pan-STARRS 1	·	1.2 km	MPC · JPL
738604	2016 UO_{138}	—	September 18, 2003	Palomar	NEAT	·	1.8 km	MPC · JPL
738605	2016 UH_{139}	—	May 3, 2010	WISE	WISE	·	2.4 km	MPC · JPL
738606	2016 UJ_{140}	—	April 26, 2006	Kitt Peak	Spacewatch	MAR	810 m	MPC · JPL
738607	2016 UY_{141}	—	March 23, 2014	Kitt Peak	Spacewatch	·	1.3 km	MPC · JPL
738608	2016 UM_{142}	—	September 18, 2007	Goodricke-Pigott	R. A. Tucker	ADE	2.3 km	MPC · JPL
738609	2016 UR_{142}	—	May 16, 2010	WISE	WISE	EOS	1.8 km	MPC · JPL
738610	2016 UU_{148}	—	October 3, 2003	Kitt Peak	Spacewatch	HNS	780 m	MPC · JPL
738611	2016 UW_{148}	—	November 1, 2008	Mount Lemmon	Mount Lemmon Survey	·	1.2 km	MPC · JPL
738612	2016 UR_{149}	—	April 5, 2014	Haleakala	Pan-STARRS 1	MAR	940 m	MPC · JPL
738613	2016 UO_{150}	—	March 30, 2010	WISE	WISE	·	1.5 km	MPC · JPL
738614	2016 UO_{247}	—	October 26, 2016	Mount Lemmon	Mount Lemmon Survey	V	490 m	MPC · JPL
738615	2016 UP_{250}	—	October 26, 2016	Mount Lemmon	Mount Lemmon Survey	·	2.0 km	MPC · JPL
738616	2016 UH_{251}	—	November 26, 2003	Kitt Peak	Spacewatch	·	1.3 km	MPC · JPL
738617	2016 UK_{251}	—	October 26, 2016	Mount Lemmon	Mount Lemmon Survey	PAD	1.1 km	MPC · JPL
738618	2016 UC_{254}	—	October 25, 2016	Haleakala	Pan-STARRS 1	·	1.2 km	MPC · JPL
738619	2016 UQ_{254}	—	October 30, 2016	Mount Lemmon	Mount Lemmon Survey	·	1.1 km	MPC · JPL
738620	2016 UD_{256}	—	October 21, 2016	Mount Lemmon	Mount Lemmon Survey	·	1.1 km	MPC · JPL
738621	2016 VJ_{4}	—	November 3, 2003	Apache Point	SDSS Collaboration	·	3.1 km	MPC · JPL
738622	2016 VL_{6}	—	November 7, 2012	Haleakala	Pan-STARRS 1	(5)	940 m	MPC · JPL
738623	2016 VU_{10}	—	February 14, 2009	Kitt Peak	Spacewatch	·	1.3 km	MPC · JPL
738624	2016 VA_{15}	—	March 11, 2005	Kitt Peak	Deep Ecliptic Survey	HNS	1.1 km	MPC · JPL
738625	2016 VB_{16}	—	May 8, 2014	Haleakala	Pan-STARRS 1	·	1.5 km	MPC · JPL
738626	2016 VE_{17}	—	November 2, 2016	Kitt Peak	Spacewatch	·	960 m	MPC · JPL
738627	2016 VN_{17}	—	August 10, 2015	Haleakala	Pan-STARRS 1	EOS	1.4 km	MPC · JPL
738628	2016 VK_{19}	—	November 14, 2007	Mount Lemmon	Mount Lemmon Survey	(1547)	1.6 km	MPC · JPL
738629	2016 VD_{20}	—	May 8, 2014	Haleakala	Pan-STARRS 1	EUN	990 m	MPC · JPL
738630	2016 VM_{28}	—	October 24, 2013	Mount Lemmon	Mount Lemmon Survey	L5	7.7 km	MPC · JPL
738631	2016 VO_{28}	—	November 5, 2016	Mount Lemmon	Mount Lemmon Survey	·	450 m	MPC · JPL
738632	2016 VY_{30}	—	November 4, 2016	Haleakala	Pan-STARRS 1	·	1.7 km	MPC · JPL
738633	2016 VU_{34}	—	May 17, 2009	Mount Lemmon	Mount Lemmon Survey	·	1.7 km	MPC · JPL
738634	2016 VB_{36}	—	November 10, 2016	Mount Lemmon	Mount Lemmon Survey	·	1.6 km	MPC · JPL
738635	2016 VL_{37}	—	November 10, 2016	Haleakala	Pan-STARRS 1	EUN	820 m	MPC · JPL
738636	2016 VQ_{37}	—	November 10, 2016	Haleakala	Pan-STARRS 1	·	1.6 km	MPC · JPL
738637	2016 VH_{40}	—	November 3, 2016	Haleakala	Pan-STARRS 1	·	1.1 km	MPC · JPL
738638	2016 VX_{50}	—	November 11, 2016	Mount Lemmon	Mount Lemmon Survey	·	2.6 km	MPC · JPL
738639	2016 VJ_{54}	—	November 6, 2016	Mount Lemmon	Mount Lemmon Survey	·	1.9 km	MPC · JPL
738640	2016 WN_{4}	—	October 22, 2003	Apache Point	SDSS	·	1.3 km	MPC · JPL
738641	2016 WV_{5}	—	November 9, 2007	Kitt Peak	Spacewatch	AGN	1 km	MPC · JPL
738642	2016 WK_{6}	—	November 22, 2012	Kitt Peak	Spacewatch	·	810 m	MPC · JPL
738643	2016 WT_{6}	—	April 19, 2009	Mount Lemmon	Mount Lemmon Survey	·	5.7 km	MPC · JPL
738644	2016 WY_{6}	—	November 7, 2012	Kitt Peak	Spacewatch	(5)	980 m	MPC · JPL
738645	2016 WZ_{11}	—	July 10, 2016	Mount Lemmon	Mount Lemmon Survey	EUN	1.1 km	MPC · JPL
738646	2016 WB_{15}	—	February 28, 2014	Haleakala	Pan-STARRS 1	·	1.5 km	MPC · JPL
738647	2016 WF_{16}	—	October 12, 2016	Haleakala	Pan-STARRS 1	MIS	1.9 km	MPC · JPL
738648	2016 WB_{21}	—	October 10, 2016	Mount Lemmon	Mount Lemmon Survey	·	1.1 km	MPC · JPL
738649	2016 WX_{21}	—	February 28, 2014	Haleakala	Pan-STARRS 1	·	1.3 km	MPC · JPL
738650	2016 WD_{26}	—	December 13, 2012	Mount Lemmon	Mount Lemmon Survey	(5)	900 m	MPC · JPL
738651	2016 WT_{26}	—	October 3, 2003	Kitt Peak	Spacewatch	·	1.5 km	MPC · JPL
738652	2016 WA_{28}	—	April 20, 2009	Mount Lemmon	Mount Lemmon Survey	·	1.7 km	MPC · JPL
738653	2016 WO_{29}	—	September 28, 2005	Palomar	NEAT	·	2.1 km	MPC · JPL
738654	2016 WT_{30}	—	June 23, 2000	Kitt Peak	Spacewatch	·	2.5 km	MPC · JPL
738655	2016 WO_{31}	—	November 18, 2003	Kitt Peak	Spacewatch	·	1.6 km	MPC · JPL
738656	2016 WN_{32}	—	September 29, 2005	Kitt Peak	Spacewatch	·	2.6 km	MPC · JPL
738657	2016 WM_{34}	—	July 11, 2015	Haleakala	Pan-STARRS 1	·	1.5 km	MPC · JPL
738658	2016 WF_{35}	—	February 28, 2014	Haleakala	Pan-STARRS 1	·	990 m	MPC · JPL
738659	2016 WP_{37}	—	July 15, 2010	WISE	WISE	·	2.5 km	MPC · JPL
738660	2016 WP_{42}	—	July 19, 2015	Haleakala	Pan-STARRS 1	·	1.4 km	MPC · JPL
738661	2016 WT_{42}	—	August 8, 2011	Charleston	R. Holmes	·	1.6 km	MPC · JPL
738662	2016 WD_{43}	—	September 21, 2003	Kitt Peak	Spacewatch	(5)	1.0 km	MPC · JPL
738663	2016 WP_{43}	—	April 15, 2005	Kitt Peak	Spacewatch	·	1.9 km	MPC · JPL
738664	2016 WC_{45}	—	September 17, 1995	Kitt Peak	Spacewatch	·	1.2 km	MPC · JPL
738665	2016 WG_{46}	—	November 18, 2008	Kitt Peak	Spacewatch	·	1.0 km	MPC · JPL
738666	2016 WJ_{46}	—	October 23, 2012	Mount Lemmon	Mount Lemmon Survey	·	1.1 km	MPC · JPL
738667	2016 WP_{47}	—	October 25, 2005	Kitt Peak	Spacewatch	·	2.4 km	MPC · JPL
738668	2016 WA_{51}	—	May 14, 2010	WISE	WISE	·	2.3 km	MPC · JPL
738669	2016 WM_{51}	—	December 9, 2012	Mayhill-ISON	L. Elenin	MAR	1.2 km	MPC · JPL
738670	2016 WP_{52}	—	August 27, 2005	Palomar	NEAT	EOS	2.9 km	MPC · JPL
738671	2016 WK_{53}	—	August 7, 2010	WISE	WISE	URS	4.1 km	MPC · JPL
738672	2016 WS_{53}	—	June 24, 2010	WISE	WISE	·	2.8 km	MPC · JPL
738673	2016 WG_{55}	—	April 1, 2003	Apache Point	SDSS Collaboration	·	5.9 km	MPC · JPL
738674	2016 WX_{56}	—	March 21, 2009	Mount Lemmon	Mount Lemmon Survey	·	1.5 km	MPC · JPL
738675	2016 WE_{57}	—	January 19, 2013	Mount Lemmon	Mount Lemmon Survey	·	1.1 km	MPC · JPL
738676	2016 WO_{58}	—	December 23, 2012	Haleakala	Pan-STARRS 1	·	1.1 km	MPC · JPL
738677	2016 WK_{61}	—	November 18, 2016	Mount Lemmon	Mount Lemmon Survey	EUN	1.2 km	MPC · JPL
738678	2016 WY_{62}	—	November 30, 2016	Mount Lemmon	Mount Lemmon Survey	·	1.6 km	MPC · JPL
738679	2016 WF_{64}	—	November 19, 2016	Mount Lemmon	Mount Lemmon Survey	·	1.2 km	MPC · JPL
738680	2016 WV_{68}	—	November 28, 2016	Haleakala	Pan-STARRS 1	·	1.2 km	MPC · JPL
738681	2016 XW_{3}	—	August 4, 2010	WISE	WISE	·	3.8 km	MPC · JPL
738682	2016 XO_{6}	—	March 3, 2010	WISE	WISE	·	2.0 km	MPC · JPL
738683	2016 XC_{7}	—	March 10, 2008	Mount Lemmon	Mount Lemmon Survey	·	2.8 km	MPC · JPL
738684	2016 XA_{8}	—	January 20, 2009	Mount Lemmon	Mount Lemmon Survey	·	1.4 km	MPC · JPL
738685	2016 XF_{8}	—	May 23, 2014	Haleakala	Pan-STARRS 1	·	1.9 km	MPC · JPL
738686	2016 XQ_{8}	—	May 2, 2014	Mount Lemmon	Mount Lemmon Survey	·	1.3 km	MPC · JPL
738687	2016 XK_{10}	—	August 23, 2007	Kitt Peak	Spacewatch	·	1.0 km	MPC · JPL
738688	2016 XW_{11}	—	October 22, 2012	Kitt Peak	Spacewatch	NYS	900 m	MPC · JPL
738689	2016 XX_{11}	—	July 3, 2010	WISE	WISE	·	1.3 km	MPC · JPL
738690	2016 XE_{12}	—	November 2, 2007	Kitt Peak	Spacewatch	NEM	1.8 km	MPC · JPL
738691	2016 XN_{12}	—	March 31, 2009	Mount Lemmon	Mount Lemmon Survey	·	2.3 km	MPC · JPL
738692	2016 XS_{12}	—	January 14, 2012	Mount Lemmon	Mount Lemmon Survey	·	2.5 km	MPC · JPL
738693	2016 XV_{13}	—	May 4, 2005	Kitt Peak	Spacewatch	·	1.7 km	MPC · JPL
738694	2016 XG_{14}	—	November 11, 2016	Mount Lemmon	Mount Lemmon Survey	·	1.8 km	MPC · JPL
738695	2016 XP_{15}	—	September 25, 1998	Anderson Mesa	LONEOS	·	1.0 km	MPC · JPL
738696	2016 XQ_{18}	—	April 17, 2004	Palomar	NEAT	·	4.9 km	MPC · JPL
738697	2016 XM_{19}	—	August 30, 1995	La Silla	C.-I. Lagerkvist	(5)	1.2 km	MPC · JPL
738698	2016 XG_{21}	—	November 19, 2003	Palomar	NEAT	·	1.4 km	MPC · JPL
738699	2016 XV_{21}	—	September 27, 2012	Haleakala	Pan-STARRS 1	·	1.2 km	MPC · JPL
738700	2016 XN_{22}	—	January 14, 2013	Mount Lemmon	Mount Lemmon Survey	BRG	1.3 km	MPC · JPL

== 738701–738800 ==
back to top

Designation			Discovery			Properties		Ref
Permanent	Provisional	Named after	Date	Site	Discoverer(s)	Category	Diam.	Ref
738701	2016 XE_{29}	—	December 4, 2016	Mount Lemmon	Mount Lemmon Survey	·	1.4 km	MPC · JPL
738702	2016 XB_{31}	—	December 4, 2016	Mount Lemmon	Mount Lemmon Survey	·	940 m	MPC · JPL
738703	2016 XD_{32}	—	December 1, 2016	Mount Lemmon	Mount Lemmon Survey	(5)	1.2 km	MPC · JPL
738704	2016 YQ_{2}	—	September 27, 2003	Apache Point	SDSS Collaboration	MAR	970 m	MPC · JPL
738705	2016 YQ_{4}	—	February 1, 2009	Catalina	CSS	·	1.4 km	MPC · JPL
738706	2016 YN_{6}	—	October 7, 2005	Catalina	CSS	NYS	1.1 km	MPC · JPL
738707	2016 YK_{7}	—	March 9, 2003	Nogales	P. R. Holvorcem, M. Schwartz	·	1.6 km	MPC · JPL
738708	2016 YJ_{9}	—	October 27, 2008	Mount Lemmon	Mount Lemmon Survey	PHO	1.2 km	MPC · JPL
738709	2016 YX_{9}	—	March 14, 2010	Vail-Jarnac	Jarnac	·	1.4 km	MPC · JPL
738710	2016 YX_{11}	—	December 8, 2010	Kitt Peak	Spacewatch	·	2.8 km	MPC · JPL
738711	2016 YJ_{13}	—	July 13, 2010	WISE	WISE	·	1.7 km	MPC · JPL
738712	2016 YL_{14}	—	December 29, 2011	Mount Lemmon	Mount Lemmon Survey	·	1.6 km	MPC · JPL
738713	2016 YL_{18}	—	December 22, 2016	Haleakala	Pan-STARRS 1	·	1.3 km	MPC · JPL
738714	2016 YF_{20}	—	December 19, 2016	Mount Lemmon	Mount Lemmon Survey	EOS	1.8 km	MPC · JPL
738715	2017 AV	—	September 25, 2003	Palomar	NEAT	·	3.6 km	MPC · JPL
738716	2017 AC_{1}	—	December 23, 2016	Haleakala	Pan-STARRS 1	·	1.9 km	MPC · JPL
738717	2017 AN_{2}	—	January 8, 2010	WISE	WISE	·	2.9 km	MPC · JPL
738718	2017 AU_{2}	—	June 27, 2010	WISE	WISE	3:2	5.7 km	MPC · JPL
738719	2017 AT_{6}	—	February 16, 2004	Kitt Peak	Spacewatch	·	1.4 km	MPC · JPL
738720	2017 AE_{7}	—	August 28, 2003	Palomar	NEAT	EOS	5.4 km	MPC · JPL
738721	2017 AX_{7}	—	September 26, 2006	Catalina	CSS	·	2.7 km	MPC · JPL
738722	2017 AL_{8}	—	February 27, 2014	Haleakala	Pan-STARRS 1	PHO	860 m	MPC · JPL
738723	2017 AX_{8}	—	September 17, 2003	Kitt Peak	Spacewatch	EUN	1.2 km	MPC · JPL
738724	2017 AR_{10}	—	October 27, 2009	Mount Lemmon	Mount Lemmon Survey	·	3.4 km	MPC · JPL
738725	2017 AD_{11}	—	December 25, 2011	Mount Lemmon	Mount Lemmon Survey	·	1.8 km	MPC · JPL
738726	2017 AX_{14}	—	November 30, 2003	Kitt Peak	Spacewatch	·	1.0 km	MPC · JPL
738727	2017 AU_{15}	—	January 9, 2000	Kitt Peak	Spacewatch	·	860 m	MPC · JPL
738728	2017 AP_{17}	—	December 6, 2016	Mount Lemmon	Mount Lemmon Survey	·	1.5 km	MPC · JPL
738729	2017 AT_{17}	—	December 25, 2005	Catalina	CSS	H	550 m	MPC · JPL
738730	2017 AZ_{17}	—	July 24, 2015	Haleakala	Pan-STARRS 1	·	1.4 km	MPC · JPL
738731	2017 AS_{21}	—	November 3, 2011	Mount Lemmon	Mount Lemmon Survey	·	1.5 km	MPC · JPL
738732	2017 AW_{21}	—	October 1, 2009	Mount Lemmon	Mount Lemmon Survey	·	5.0 km	MPC · JPL
738733	2017 AA_{23}	—	March 2, 2012	Kitt Peak	Spacewatch	EOS	1.6 km	MPC · JPL
738734	2017 AZ_{23}	—	August 3, 2014	Haleakala	Pan-STARRS 1	·	1.8 km	MPC · JPL
738735	2017 AN_{24}	—	January 30, 2010	WISE	WISE	·	3.0 km	MPC · JPL
738736	2017 AN_{33}	—	January 7, 2017	Mount Lemmon	Mount Lemmon Survey	·	1.4 km	MPC · JPL
738737	2017 AG_{39}	—	January 3, 2017	Haleakala	Pan-STARRS 1	MAR	850 m	MPC · JPL
738738	2017 AY_{43}	—	January 9, 2017	Mount Lemmon	Mount Lemmon Survey	·	900 m	MPC · JPL
738739	2017 AE_{45}	—	January 2, 2017	Haleakala	Pan-STARRS 1	L5	8.1 km	MPC · JPL
738740	2017 AO_{46}	—	January 4, 2017	Haleakala	Pan-STARRS 1	·	2.1 km	MPC · JPL
738741	2017 AM_{53}	—	January 10, 2017	Haleakala	Pan-STARRS 1	TIR	2.7 km	MPC · JPL
738742	2017 AR_{54}	—	January 3, 2017	Haleakala	Pan-STARRS 1	ADE	1.6 km	MPC · JPL
738743	2017 AU_{58}	—	January 4, 2017	Haleakala	Pan-STARRS 1	·	2.1 km	MPC · JPL
738744	2017 BN_{1}	—	January 19, 2013	Kitt Peak	Spacewatch	EUN	920 m	MPC · JPL
738745	2017 BJ_{2}	—	December 31, 2007	Mount Lemmon	Mount Lemmon Survey	·	1.5 km	MPC · JPL
738746	2017 BH_{4}	—	April 2, 2009	Kitt Peak	Spacewatch	H	480 m	MPC · JPL
738747	2017 BD_{5}	—	September 2, 2010	Mount Lemmon	Mount Lemmon Survey	·	1.8 km	MPC · JPL
738748	2017 BW_{5}	—	April 17, 2010	WISE	WISE	L5	9.2 km	MPC · JPL
738749	2017 BT_{7}	—	October 17, 2009	Catalina	CSS	·	5.1 km	MPC · JPL
738750	2017 BV_{8}	—	September 4, 2011	Haleakala	Pan-STARRS 1	·	1.4 km	MPC · JPL
738751	2017 BF_{9}	—	August 4, 2002	Palomar	NEAT	·	5.4 km	MPC · JPL
738752	2017 BX_{9}	—	January 30, 2008	Mount Lemmon	Mount Lemmon Survey	·	1.6 km	MPC · JPL
738753	2017 BM_{10}	—	February 10, 2002	Socorro	LINEAR	·	1.8 km	MPC · JPL
738754	2017 BQ_{10}	—	February 16, 2012	Haleakala	Pan-STARRS 1	EOS	1.4 km	MPC · JPL
738755	2017 BL_{11}	—	January 8, 2002	Apache Point	SDSS	L5	9.6 km	MPC · JPL
738756	2017 BP_{12}	—	January 13, 2005	Kitt Peak	Spacewatch	·	1.1 km	MPC · JPL
738757	2017 BV_{19}	—	December 30, 2007	Kitt Peak	Spacewatch	·	1.5 km	MPC · JPL
738758	2017 BX_{19}	—	January 15, 2008	Mount Lemmon	Mount Lemmon Survey	·	1.6 km	MPC · JPL
738759	2017 BU_{20}	—	September 19, 2011	Mount Lemmon	Mount Lemmon Survey	·	810 m	MPC · JPL
738760	2017 BY_{20}	—	August 31, 2014	Haleakala	Pan-STARRS 1	·	2.5 km	MPC · JPL
738761	2017 BC_{21}	—	January 26, 2017	Haleakala	Pan-STARRS 1	·	900 m	MPC · JPL
738762	2017 BD_{24}	—	September 17, 2006	Kitt Peak	Spacewatch	WIT	790 m	MPC · JPL
738763	2017 BP_{24}	—	December 7, 2015	Haleakala	Pan-STARRS 1	·	2.3 km	MPC · JPL
738764	2017 BT_{25}	—	September 17, 2012	Kitt Peak	Spacewatch	·	540 m	MPC · JPL
738765	2017 BZ_{25}	—	February 8, 2013	Haleakala	Pan-STARRS 1	·	1.2 km	MPC · JPL
738766	2017 BA_{33}	—	January 5, 2017	Mount Lemmon	Mount Lemmon Survey	·	1.4 km	MPC · JPL
738767	2017 BO_{33}	—	October 31, 2010	Piszkéstető	K. Sárneczky, Z. Kuli	·	1.6 km	MPC · JPL
738768	2017 BN_{34}	—	January 27, 2017	Haleakala	Pan-STARRS 1	·	1.5 km	MPC · JPL
738769	2017 BY_{35}	—	January 13, 2011	Mount Lemmon	Mount Lemmon Survey	LUT	3.7 km	MPC · JPL
738770	2017 BJ_{36}	—	March 2, 2008	Kitt Peak	Spacewatch	·	1.8 km	MPC · JPL
738771	2017 BE_{38}	—	January 23, 2017	GINOP-KHK, Piszkes	K. Sárneczky	·	1.8 km	MPC · JPL
738772	2017 BQ_{40}	—	August 14, 2015	Haleakala	Pan-STARRS 1	·	1.3 km	MPC · JPL
738773	2017 BL_{41}	—	February 27, 2008	Kitt Peak	Spacewatch	KOR	1.1 km	MPC · JPL
738774	2017 BG_{42}	—	October 18, 2003	Palomar	NEAT	KON	2.2 km	MPC · JPL
738775	2017 BB_{48}	—	July 28, 2011	Haleakala	Pan-STARRS 1	·	1.1 km	MPC · JPL
738776	2017 BH_{48}	—	September 17, 2006	Kitt Peak	Spacewatch	·	1.3 km	MPC · JPL
738777	2017 BY_{48}	—	September 12, 2015	Haleakala	Pan-STARRS 1	·	1.6 km	MPC · JPL
738778	2017 BF_{49}	—	January 7, 2006	Kitt Peak	Spacewatch	·	2.5 km	MPC · JPL
738779	2017 BP_{49}	—	February 10, 2008	Kitt Peak	Spacewatch	HOF	2.6 km	MPC · JPL
738780	2017 BB_{52}	—	April 5, 2013	Haleakala	Pan-STARRS 1	·	1.8 km	MPC · JPL
738781	2017 BF_{55}	—	September 6, 2015	Kitt Peak	Spacewatch	·	1.3 km	MPC · JPL
738782	2017 BS_{55}	—	October 2, 2006	Mount Lemmon	Mount Lemmon Survey	·	1.4 km	MPC · JPL
738783	2017 BT_{59}	—	October 23, 2011	Haleakala	Pan-STARRS 1	·	1.2 km	MPC · JPL
738784	2017 BY_{59}	—	October 19, 2012	Haleakala	Pan-STARRS 1	·	600 m	MPC · JPL
738785	2017 BW_{60}	—	January 26, 2017	Haleakala	Pan-STARRS 1	·	2.4 km	MPC · JPL
738786	2017 BV_{64}	—	June 10, 2010	WISE	WISE	ERI	1.4 km	MPC · JPL
738787	2017 BC_{66}	—	February 13, 2013	Haleakala	Pan-STARRS 1	·	2.4 km	MPC · JPL
738788	2017 BA_{67}	—	December 21, 2007	Mount Lemmon	Mount Lemmon Survey	·	1.5 km	MPC · JPL
738789	2017 BK_{67}	—	November 24, 2011	Mount Lemmon	Mount Lemmon Survey	·	1.3 km	MPC · JPL
738790	2017 BL_{68}	—	January 30, 2008	Mount Lemmon	Mount Lemmon Survey	·	1.3 km	MPC · JPL
738791	2017 BJ_{70}	—	December 4, 2007	Kitt Peak	Spacewatch	LEO	1.5 km	MPC · JPL
738792	2017 BT_{70}	—	February 19, 2009	Kitt Peak	Spacewatch	·	1.1 km	MPC · JPL
738793	2017 BC_{73}	—	March 8, 2013	Haleakala	Pan-STARRS 1	·	1.3 km	MPC · JPL
738794	2017 BX_{73}	—	July 1, 2014	Haleakala	Pan-STARRS 1	·	2.2 km	MPC · JPL
738795	2017 BG_{77}	—	October 30, 2007	Kitt Peak	Spacewatch	·	1.2 km	MPC · JPL
738796	2017 BR_{80}	—	October 12, 2007	Mount Lemmon	Mount Lemmon Survey	(5)	980 m	MPC · JPL
738797	2017 BE_{81}	—	March 2, 1995	Kitt Peak	Spacewatch	NYS	1.0 km	MPC · JPL
738798	2017 BK_{81}	—	January 2, 2012	Mount Lemmon	Mount Lemmon Survey	·	1.8 km	MPC · JPL
738799	2017 BQ_{81}	—	October 28, 2006	Mount Lemmon	Mount Lemmon Survey	AGN	1.0 km	MPC · JPL
738800	2017 BO_{83}	—	February 8, 2008	Kitt Peak	Spacewatch	·	2.0 km	MPC · JPL

== 738801–738900 ==
back to top

Designation			Discovery			Properties		Ref
Permanent	Provisional	Named after	Date	Site	Discoverer(s)	Category	Diam.	Ref
738801	2017 BM_{85}	—	October 19, 2003	Apache Point	SDSS Collaboration	EOS	2.0 km	MPC · JPL
738802	2017 BY_{86}	—	January 15, 2007	Mauna Kea	P. A. Wiegert	·	2.2 km	MPC · JPL
738803	2017 BK_{87}	—	September 20, 2003	Palomar	NEAT	·	3.7 km	MPC · JPL
738804	2017 BP_{88}	—	October 20, 2006	Kitt Peak	Spacewatch	·	1.7 km	MPC · JPL
738805	2017 BQ_{89}	—	November 24, 2011	Haleakala	Pan-STARRS 1	MRX	760 m	MPC · JPL
738806	2017 BF_{95}	—	February 11, 2008	Kitt Peak	Spacewatch	·	1.4 km	MPC · JPL
738807	2017 BZ_{95}	—	October 28, 2010	Kitt Peak	Spacewatch	·	1.7 km	MPC · JPL
738808	2017 BP_{97}	—	September 15, 2010	Kitt Peak	Spacewatch	·	1.9 km	MPC · JPL
738809	2017 BQ_{97}	—	July 6, 2010	Mount Lemmon	Mount Lemmon Survey	HNS	1.4 km	MPC · JPL
738810	2017 BB_{100}	—	October 24, 2005	Mauna Kea	A. Boattini	L5	6.7 km	MPC · JPL
738811	2017 BG_{100}	—	July 26, 2011	Haleakala	Pan-STARRS 1	·	990 m	MPC · JPL
738812	2017 BO_{100}	—	January 19, 2005	Kitt Peak	Spacewatch	L5	8.3 km	MPC · JPL
738813	2017 BB_{101}	—	August 24, 2006	Socorro	LINEAR	·	2.5 km	MPC · JPL
738814	2017 BZ_{102}	—	July 21, 2002	Palomar	NEAT	EUP	3.8 km	MPC · JPL
738815	2017 BR_{103}	—	June 27, 2014	Haleakala	Pan-STARRS 1	·	1.9 km	MPC · JPL
738816	2017 BG_{107}	—	July 29, 2010	WISE	WISE	·	2.0 km	MPC · JPL
738817	2017 BR_{108}	—	June 8, 2008	Kitt Peak	Spacewatch	·	4.5 km	MPC · JPL
738818	2017 BC_{109}	—	October 6, 1999	Kitt Peak	Spacewatch	·	890 m	MPC · JPL
738819	2017 BQ_{109}	—	January 2, 2017	Haleakala	Pan-STARRS 1	·	1.8 km	MPC · JPL
738820	2017 BF_{111}	—	October 26, 2009	Mount Lemmon	Mount Lemmon Survey	·	4.4 km	MPC · JPL
738821	2017 BN_{111}	—	January 26, 2006	Kitt Peak	Spacewatch	·	2.5 km	MPC · JPL
738822	2017 BG_{112}	—	May 24, 2001	Apache Point	SDSS Collaboration	·	3.1 km	MPC · JPL
738823	2017 BS_{112}	—	February 23, 2010	WISE	WISE	·	1.1 km	MPC · JPL
738824	2017 BO_{114}	—	April 12, 2005	Anderson Mesa	LONEOS	·	1.5 km	MPC · JPL
738825	2017 BN_{115}	—	September 24, 2011	Haleakala	Pan-STARRS 1	HNS	990 m	MPC · JPL
738826	2017 BU_{117}	—	January 30, 2017	Haleakala	Pan-STARRS 1	PHO	750 m	MPC · JPL
738827	2017 BH_{118}	—	July 7, 2010	WISE	WISE	PHO	760 m	MPC · JPL
738828	2017 BZ_{119}	—	November 19, 2009	Mount Lemmon	Mount Lemmon Survey	LIX	4.4 km	MPC · JPL
738829	2017 BC_{121}	—	December 19, 2004	Kitt Peak	Spacewatch	·	3.3 km	MPC · JPL
738830	2017 BL_{122}	—	February 3, 2008	Kitt Peak	Spacewatch	·	1.4 km	MPC · JPL
738831	2017 BP_{123}	—	April 23, 2009	Kitt Peak	Spacewatch	·	1.6 km	MPC · JPL
738832	2017 BW_{123}	—	February 12, 2000	Apache Point	SDSS Collaboration	HNS	1.1 km	MPC · JPL
738833	2017 BO_{124}	—	October 24, 2009	Kitt Peak	Spacewatch	·	3.2 km	MPC · JPL
738834	2017 BB_{125}	—	July 25, 2014	Haleakala	Pan-STARRS 1	·	1.5 km	MPC · JPL
738835	2017 BF_{125}	—	March 31, 2009	Mount Lemmon	Mount Lemmon Survey	·	1.0 km	MPC · JPL
738836	2017 BG_{126}	—	March 12, 2003	Kitt Peak	Spacewatch	·	2.0 km	MPC · JPL
738837	2017 BZ_{126}	—	February 9, 2008	Kitt Peak	Spacewatch	·	1.8 km	MPC · JPL
738838	2017 BS_{129}	—	February 24, 2006	Kitt Peak	Spacewatch	·	4.1 km	MPC · JPL
738839	2017 BX_{129}	—	September 16, 2009	Mount Lemmon	Mount Lemmon Survey	LUT	4.3 km	MPC · JPL
738840	2017 BY_{130}	—	December 29, 2011	Mount Lemmon	Mount Lemmon Survey	·	1.5 km	MPC · JPL
738841	2017 BH_{131}	—	September 19, 2001	Kitt Peak	Spacewatch	SYL	4.1 km	MPC · JPL
738842	2017 BO_{131}	—	September 23, 2015	Haleakala	Pan-STARRS 1	·	1.9 km	MPC · JPL
738843	2017 BZ_{132}	—	October 15, 2015	Haleakala	Pan-STARRS 1	·	1.6 km	MPC · JPL
738844	2017 BJ_{134}	—	December 27, 2011	Mount Lemmon	Mount Lemmon Survey	AGN	940 m	MPC · JPL
738845	2017 BO_{136}	—	September 25, 2003	Palomar	NEAT	·	4.4 km	MPC · JPL
738846	2017 BS_{136}	—	January 22, 2006	Mount Lemmon	Mount Lemmon Survey	·	1.9 km	MPC · JPL
738847	2017 BC_{137}	—	December 1, 2015	Haleakala	Pan-STARRS 1	·	1.8 km	MPC · JPL
738848	2017 BW_{137}	—	September 7, 2008	Mount Lemmon	Mount Lemmon Survey	·	1.6 km	MPC · JPL
738849	2017 BE_{138}	—	September 18, 2009	Kitt Peak	Spacewatch	EOS	1.9 km	MPC · JPL
738850	2017 BG_{139}	—	March 23, 2012	Mount Lemmon	Mount Lemmon Survey	·	2.2 km	MPC · JPL
738851	2017 BO_{141}	—	April 12, 2013	Haleakala	Pan-STARRS 1	MRX	790 m	MPC · JPL
738852	2017 BQ_{146}	—	January 15, 2008	Mount Lemmon	Mount Lemmon Survey	·	1.7 km	MPC · JPL
738853	2017 BD_{149}	—	February 7, 2013	Kitt Peak	Spacewatch	·	1.2 km	MPC · JPL
738854	2017 BS_{158}	—	January 27, 2017	Haleakala	Pan-STARRS 1	L5	8.0 km	MPC · JPL
738855	2017 BE_{161}	—	October 16, 2015	Mount Lemmon	Mount Lemmon Survey	·	1.3 km	MPC · JPL
738856	2017 BR_{161}	—	January 28, 2017	Haleakala	Pan-STARRS 1	L5	6.7 km	MPC · JPL
738857	2017 BM_{176}	—	January 28, 2017	Haleakala	Pan-STARRS 1	·	950 m	MPC · JPL
738858	2017 BG_{185}	—	March 25, 2012	Catalina	CSS	TIR	2.4 km	MPC · JPL
738859	2017 BM_{205}	—	October 19, 2015	Haleakala	Pan-STARRS 1	AGN	970 m	MPC · JPL
738860	2017 BL_{216}	—	January 28, 2017	Haleakala	Pan-STARRS 1	·	1.3 km	MPC · JPL
738861	2017 CA_{4}	—	March 13, 2010	WISE	WISE	·	1.6 km	MPC · JPL
738862	2017 CX_{5}	—	August 28, 2014	Haleakala	Pan-STARRS 1	·	1.5 km	MPC · JPL
738863	2017 CE_{7}	—	January 12, 2008	Mount Lemmon	Mount Lemmon Survey	·	1.7 km	MPC · JPL
738864	2017 CU_{7}	—	March 8, 2005	Mount Lemmon	Mount Lemmon Survey	L5	10 km	MPC · JPL
738865	2017 CE_{12}	—	February 2, 2006	Kitt Peak	Spacewatch	·	2.4 km	MPC · JPL
738866	2017 CC_{13}	—	October 24, 2005	Mauna Kea	A. Boattini	·	4.2 km	MPC · JPL
738867	2017 CL_{13}	—	March 5, 2013	Haleakala	Pan-STARRS 1	·	1.1 km	MPC · JPL
738868	2017 CJ_{15}	—	January 30, 2008	Mount Lemmon	Mount Lemmon Survey	NEM	1.8 km	MPC · JPL
738869	2017 CH_{16}	—	October 28, 2006	Mount Lemmon	Mount Lemmon Survey	AST	1.5 km	MPC · JPL
738870	2017 CJ_{18}	—	January 10, 2008	Mount Lemmon	Mount Lemmon Survey	EUN	1.1 km	MPC · JPL
738871	2017 CN_{19}	—	September 9, 2015	Haleakala	Pan-STARRS 1	AST	1.2 km	MPC · JPL
738872	2017 CV_{20}	—	January 31, 2009	Mount Lemmon	Mount Lemmon Survey	·	970 m	MPC · JPL
738873	2017 CU_{21}	—	October 9, 2015	Cerro Paranal	Altmann, M., Prusti, T.	·	860 m	MPC · JPL
738874	2017 CK_{24}	—	October 12, 2015	Haleakala	Pan-STARRS 1	HOF	1.8 km	MPC · JPL
738875	2017 CW_{26}	—	February 16, 2012	Haleakala	Pan-STARRS 1	·	1.7 km	MPC · JPL
738876	2017 CC_{27}	—	September 12, 2015	Haleakala	Pan-STARRS 1	·	1.6 km	MPC · JPL
738877	2017 CV_{28}	—	August 21, 2015	Haleakala	Pan-STARRS 1	·	1.6 km	MPC · JPL
738878	2017 CQ_{30}	—	January 16, 2011	Mount Lemmon	Mount Lemmon Survey	·	1.9 km	MPC · JPL
738879	2017 CR_{31}	—	October 23, 2015	Haleakala	Pan-STARRS 1	EUN	1.1 km	MPC · JPL
738880	2017 CH_{34}	—	February 13, 2012	Kitt Peak	Spacewatch	·	2.5 km	MPC · JPL
738881	2017 CN_{34}	—	June 20, 2013	Haleakala	Pan-STARRS 1	·	2.7 km	MPC · JPL
738882	2017 CG_{35}	—	March 9, 2011	Kitt Peak	Spacewatch	·	2.5 km	MPC · JPL
738883	2017 CS_{39}	—	February 2, 2017	Haleakala	Pan-STARRS 1	THB	2.3 km	MPC · JPL
738884	2017 CJ_{43}	—	February 2, 2017	Haleakala	Pan-STARRS 1	·	1.5 km	MPC · JPL
738885	2017 DA_{2}	—	March 16, 2004	Kitt Peak	Spacewatch	·	670 m	MPC · JPL
738886	2017 DB_{2}	—	January 26, 2017	Mount Lemmon	Mount Lemmon Survey	·	1.9 km	MPC · JPL
738887	2017 DK_{2}	—	September 9, 2015	Haleakala	Pan-STARRS 1	NYS	790 m	MPC · JPL
738888	2017 DX_{2}	—	December 30, 2007	Mount Lemmon	Mount Lemmon Survey	·	1.5 km	MPC · JPL
738889	2017 DA_{3}	—	October 15, 2015	Haleakala	Pan-STARRS 1	·	1.5 km	MPC · JPL
738890	2017 DB_{3}	—	January 23, 2006	Kitt Peak	Spacewatch	·	1.9 km	MPC · JPL
738891	2017 DN_{3}	—	January 26, 2006	Mount Lemmon	Mount Lemmon Survey	·	2.3 km	MPC · JPL
738892	2017 DS_{3}	—	November 28, 2011	Kitt Peak	Spacewatch	·	1.3 km	MPC · JPL
738893	2017 DW_{3}	—	December 30, 2005	Kitt Peak	Spacewatch	·	1.9 km	MPC · JPL
738894	2017 DC_{5}	—	August 23, 2011	Haleakala	Pan-STARRS 1	·	840 m	MPC · JPL
738895	2017 DO_{6}	—	July 23, 2015	Haleakala	Pan-STARRS 1	·	1.8 km	MPC · JPL
738896	2017 DZ_{6}	—	July 2, 2014	Haleakala	Pan-STARRS 1	·	1.8 km	MPC · JPL
738897	2017 DY_{8}	—	January 13, 2010	WISE	WISE	·	3.1 km	MPC · JPL
738898	2017 DH_{11}	—	March 12, 2007	Kitt Peak	Spacewatch	·	1.7 km	MPC · JPL
738899	2017 DC_{12}	—	September 19, 2006	Kitt Peak	Spacewatch	·	1.5 km	MPC · JPL
738900	2017 DN_{12}	—	March 13, 2013	Haleakala	Pan-STARRS 1	·	1.6 km	MPC · JPL

== 738901–739000 ==
back to top

Designation			Discovery			Properties		Ref
Permanent	Provisional	Named after	Date	Site	Discoverer(s)	Category	Diam.	Ref
738901	2017 DJ_{13}	—	July 26, 2010	WISE	WISE	·	3.4 km	MPC · JPL
738902	2017 DZ_{13}	—	December 25, 2011	Mount Lemmon	Mount Lemmon Survey	MRX	1.0 km	MPC · JPL
738903	2017 DQ_{14}	—	May 11, 2005	Palomar	NEAT	·	1.8 km	MPC · JPL
738904	2017 DN_{16}	—	April 13, 2013	Haleakala	Pan-STARRS 1	EUN	1.1 km	MPC · JPL
738905	2017 DB_{17}	—	March 12, 2008	Mount Lemmon	Mount Lemmon Survey	HOF	2.0 km	MPC · JPL
738906	2017 DT_{17}	—	August 22, 2014	Haleakala	Pan-STARRS 1	·	1.4 km	MPC · JPL
738907	2017 DL_{18}	—	March 24, 2012	Mount Lemmon	Mount Lemmon Survey	·	2.4 km	MPC · JPL
738908	2017 DS_{19}	—	January 29, 2010	WISE	WISE	·	2.7 km	MPC · JPL
738909	2017 DK_{20}	—	May 1, 2009	Kitt Peak	Spacewatch	·	1.3 km	MPC · JPL
738910	2017 DQ_{21}	—	March 13, 2012	Mount Lemmon	Mount Lemmon Survey	·	1.7 km	MPC · JPL
738911	2017 DX_{21}	—	September 28, 2003	Kitt Peak	Spacewatch	·	2.2 km	MPC · JPL
738912	2017 DL_{23}	—	September 29, 2010	Mount Lemmon	Mount Lemmon Survey	·	1.6 km	MPC · JPL
738913	2017 DE_{24}	—	November 10, 2009	Mount Lemmon	Mount Lemmon Survey	·	570 m	MPC · JPL
738914	2017 DG_{25}	—	September 12, 2002	Palomar	NEAT	·	1.3 km	MPC · JPL
738915	2017 DA_{27}	—	February 10, 2011	Mount Lemmon	Mount Lemmon Survey	·	2.6 km	MPC · JPL
738916	2017 DK_{28}	—	February 1, 2012	Kitt Peak	Spacewatch	·	1.3 km	MPC · JPL
738917	2017 DG_{29}	—	May 18, 2010	WISE	WISE	·	2.8 km	MPC · JPL
738918	2017 DM_{32}	—	November 2, 2007	Mount Lemmon	Mount Lemmon Survey	·	870 m	MPC · JPL
738919	2017 DQ_{40}	—	January 1, 2012	Mount Lemmon	Mount Lemmon Survey	·	1.5 km	MPC · JPL
738920	2017 DK_{43}	—	February 15, 2012	Haleakala	Pan-STARRS 1	·	1.3 km	MPC · JPL
738921	2017 DM_{44}	—	January 26, 2011	Mount Lemmon	Mount Lemmon Survey	(21885)	2.3 km	MPC · JPL
738922	2017 DR_{44}	—	December 27, 2006	Mount Lemmon	Mount Lemmon Survey	·	1.7 km	MPC · JPL
738923	2017 DJ_{45}	—	April 8, 2013	Mount Lemmon	Mount Lemmon Survey	·	1.4 km	MPC · JPL
738924	2017 DP_{45}	—	January 19, 2010	WISE	WISE	ELF	3.2 km	MPC · JPL
738925	2017 DU_{45}	—	February 20, 2006	Catalina	CSS	·	3.0 km	MPC · JPL
738926 Nitschelm	2017 DK_{47}	Nitschelm	June 4, 2011	Cerro Tololo	EURONEAR	·	770 m	MPC · JPL
738927	2017 DB_{48}	—	August 21, 2015	Haleakala	Pan-STARRS 1	·	1.3 km	MPC · JPL
738928	2017 DL_{48}	—	January 27, 2017	Haleakala	Pan-STARRS 1	T_{j} (2.98) · EUP	3.4 km	MPC · JPL
738929	2017 DV_{49}	—	February 21, 2017	Mount Lemmon	Mount Lemmon Survey	·	2.5 km	MPC · JPL
738930	2017 DC_{54}	—	January 19, 2012	Haleakala	Pan-STARRS 1	·	1.7 km	MPC · JPL
738931	2017 DP_{54}	—	October 17, 2012	Haleakala	Pan-STARRS 1	·	520 m	MPC · JPL
738932	2017 DV_{54}	—	February 13, 2008	Kitt Peak	Spacewatch	·	1.6 km	MPC · JPL
738933	2017 DF_{56}	—	January 26, 2011	Mount Lemmon	Mount Lemmon Survey	·	2.7 km	MPC · JPL
738934	2017 DC_{57}	—	November 3, 2010	Kitt Peak	Spacewatch	EOS	1.5 km	MPC · JPL
738935	2017 DK_{57}	—	October 1, 2009	Mount Lemmon	Mount Lemmon Survey	·	2.7 km	MPC · JPL
738936	2017 DR_{57}	—	October 23, 2009	Mount Lemmon	Mount Lemmon Survey	·	2.5 km	MPC · JPL
738937	2017 DU_{57}	—	February 21, 2017	Mount Lemmon	Mount Lemmon Survey	·	1.6 km	MPC · JPL
738938	2017 DZ_{58}	—	January 8, 2010	WISE	WISE	·	3.5 km	MPC · JPL
738939	2017 DL_{59}	—	October 23, 2003	Apache Point	SDSS Collaboration	·	3.7 km	MPC · JPL
738940	2017 DM_{59}	—	September 9, 2015	Haleakala	Pan-STARRS 1	·	1.8 km	MPC · JPL
738941	2017 DQ_{59}	—	January 16, 2011	Mount Lemmon	Mount Lemmon Survey	·	2.1 km	MPC · JPL
738942	2017 DS_{60}	—	January 14, 2011	Mount Lemmon	Mount Lemmon Survey	·	2.2 km	MPC · JPL
738943	2017 DO_{61}	—	April 17, 2009	Kitt Peak	Spacewatch	·	1.2 km	MPC · JPL
738944	2017 DN_{62}	—	October 10, 2015	Haleakala	Pan-STARRS 1	·	880 m	MPC · JPL
738945	2017 DT_{62}	—	February 14, 2013	Kitt Peak	Spacewatch	·	760 m	MPC · JPL
738946	2017 DB_{63}	—	March 12, 2013	Kitt Peak	Spacewatch	·	1.5 km	MPC · JPL
738947	2017 DK_{65}	—	December 18, 2009	Mount Lemmon	Mount Lemmon Survey	·	3.5 km	MPC · JPL
738948	2017 DJ_{67}	—	February 27, 2006	Kitt Peak	Spacewatch	THM	2.0 km	MPC · JPL
738949	2017 DV_{68}	—	September 30, 2009	Mount Lemmon	Mount Lemmon Survey	·	3.1 km	MPC · JPL
738950	2017 DQ_{70}	—	February 8, 2008	Kitt Peak	Spacewatch	·	1.8 km	MPC · JPL
738951	2017 DW_{72}	—	February 25, 2003	Campo Imperatore	CINEOS	·	1.9 km	MPC · JPL
738952	2017 DL_{74}	—	March 28, 2008	Mount Lemmon	Mount Lemmon Survey	·	1.4 km	MPC · JPL
738953	2017 DX_{74}	—	February 23, 2012	Kitt Peak	Spacewatch	·	1.9 km	MPC · JPL
738954	2017 DN_{76}	—	January 29, 2011	Kitt Peak	Spacewatch	·	2.3 km	MPC · JPL
738955	2017 DO_{76}	—	October 28, 2005	Kitt Peak	Spacewatch	·	1.6 km	MPC · JPL
738956	2017 DJ_{80}	—	January 21, 2006	Mount Lemmon	Mount Lemmon Survey	·	1.5 km	MPC · JPL
738957	2017 DT_{80}	—	March 13, 2004	Palomar	NEAT	·	1.2 km	MPC · JPL
738958	2017 DW_{80}	—	February 19, 2010	WISE	WISE	·	4.2 km	MPC · JPL
738959	2017 DH_{81}	—	January 27, 2006	Kitt Peak	Spacewatch	·	1.4 km	MPC · JPL
738960	2017 DR_{81}	—	January 10, 2010	Mount Lemmon	Mount Lemmon Survey	EOS	2.2 km	MPC · JPL
738961	2017 DN_{82}	—	February 24, 2010	WISE	WISE	·	5.2 km	MPC · JPL
738962	2017 DT_{82}	—	January 21, 2013	Haleakala	Pan-STARRS 1	JUN	950 m	MPC · JPL
738963	2017 DG_{84}	—	March 10, 2000	Socorro	LINEAR	·	2.2 km	MPC · JPL
738964	2017 DZ_{85}	—	February 7, 2008	Catalina	CSS	·	1.5 km	MPC · JPL
738965	2017 DH_{86}	—	February 3, 2010	WISE	WISE	·	4.1 km	MPC · JPL
738966	2017 DU_{86}	—	April 20, 2010	Mount Lemmon	Mount Lemmon Survey	·	960 m	MPC · JPL
738967	2017 DJ_{89}	—	March 30, 2010	WISE	WISE	·	2.1 km	MPC · JPL
738968	2017 DX_{89}	—	April 12, 2013	Haleakala	Pan-STARRS 1	·	1.5 km	MPC · JPL
738969	2017 DN_{94}	—	September 16, 2009	Mount Lemmon	Mount Lemmon Survey	·	1.4 km	MPC · JPL
738970	2017 DW_{96}	—	October 25, 2005	Kitt Peak	Spacewatch	·	1.6 km	MPC · JPL
738971	2017 DZ_{97}	—	February 11, 2010	WISE	WISE	3:2	4.3 km	MPC · JPL
738972	2017 DO_{98}	—	October 1, 2005	Kitt Peak	Spacewatch	3:2	6.1 km	MPC · JPL
738973	2017 DX_{98}	—	December 10, 2010	Mount Lemmon	Mount Lemmon Survey	·	2.0 km	MPC · JPL
738974	2017 DD_{99}	—	January 6, 2012	Haleakala	Pan-STARRS 1	·	1.6 km	MPC · JPL
738975	2017 DL_{99}	—	October 17, 2003	Apache Point	SDSS Collaboration	·	2.9 km	MPC · JPL
738976	2017 DQ_{99}	—	September 13, 2002	Palomar	NEAT	URS	3.6 km	MPC · JPL
738977	2017 DC_{100}	—	January 26, 2017	Haleakala	Pan-STARRS 1	·	2.1 km	MPC · JPL
738978	2017 DE_{100}	—	January 14, 2010	WISE	WISE	·	3.2 km	MPC · JPL
738979	2017 DL_{101}	—	August 17, 2009	Kitt Peak	Spacewatch	·	2.0 km	MPC · JPL
738980	2017 DD_{102}	—	September 2, 2014	Haleakala	Pan-STARRS 1	·	1.9 km	MPC · JPL
738981	2017 DL_{103}	—	January 19, 2012	Haleakala	Pan-STARRS 1	·	1.7 km	MPC · JPL
738982	2017 DY_{104}	—	August 16, 2006	Palomar	NEAT	·	1.8 km	MPC · JPL
738983	2017 DA_{105}	—	September 20, 2009	Mount Lemmon	Mount Lemmon Survey	EOS	1.7 km	MPC · JPL
738984	2017 DU_{105}	—	September 26, 2006	Kitt Peak	Spacewatch	·	1.4 km	MPC · JPL
738985	2017 DX_{105}	—	January 3, 2017	Haleakala	Pan-STARRS 1	·	1.1 km	MPC · JPL
738986	2017 DO_{106}	—	December 29, 2011	Mount Lemmon	Mount Lemmon Survey	·	2.2 km	MPC · JPL
738987	2017 DC_{107}	—	October 25, 2015	Haleakala	Pan-STARRS 1	·	1.7 km	MPC · JPL
738988	2017 DJ_{107}	—	June 22, 2010	WISE	WISE	·	1.7 km	MPC · JPL
738989	2017 DO_{107}	—	December 5, 2007	Mount Lemmon	Mount Lemmon Survey	·	2.5 km	MPC · JPL
738990	2017 DQ_{107}	—	March 5, 2013	Haleakala	Pan-STARRS 1	·	1.7 km	MPC · JPL
738991	2017 DS_{107}	—	November 20, 2015	Mount Lemmon	Mount Lemmon Survey	·	1.9 km	MPC · JPL
738992	2017 DE_{110}	—	August 5, 2010	WISE	WISE	TRE	2.0 km	MPC · JPL
738993	2017 DK_{110}	—	March 1, 2008	Catalina	CSS	·	1.9 km	MPC · JPL
738994	2017 DN_{110}	—	April 5, 2006	Siding Spring	SSS	·	4.8 km	MPC · JPL
738995	2017 DD_{112}	—	April 14, 1993	Kitt Peak	Spacewatch	EUN	3.7 km	MPC · JPL
738996	2017 DJ_{113}	—	January 27, 2011	Catalina	CSS	·	2.8 km	MPC · JPL
738997	2017 DZ_{113}	—	August 6, 2012	Haleakala	Pan-STARRS 1	T_{j} (2.95)	2.9 km	MPC · JPL
738998	2017 DV_{114}	—	March 25, 2003	Palomar	NEAT	·	1.8 km	MPC · JPL
738999	2017 DK_{115}	—	August 22, 2014	Haleakala	Pan-STARRS 1	·	2.3 km	MPC · JPL
739000	2017 DC_{117}	—	April 27, 2012	Haleakala	Pan-STARRS 1	·	2.5 km	MPC · JPL

back to top

== Meaning of names ==
As minor planet discoveries are confirmed, they are given a permanent number by the IAU's Minor Planet Center (MPC), and the discoverers can then submit names for them, following the IAU's naming conventions. The list below concerns those minor planets in the specified number-range that have received names, and explains the meanings of those names.

Official naming citations of newly named small Solar System bodies are approved and published in a bulletin by IAU's Working Group for Small Bodies Nomenclature (WGSBN). Before May 2021, citations were published in MPC's Minor Planet Circulars for many decades. Recent citations can also be found on the JPL Small-Body Database (SBDB). Until his death in 2016, German astronomer Lutz D. Schmadel compiled these citations into the Dictionary of Minor Planet Names (DMP) and regularly updated the collection.

Based on Paul Herget's The Names of the Minor Planets, Schmadel also researched the unclear origin of numerous asteroids, most of which had been named prior to World War II. This article incorporates text from this source, which is in the public domain: SBDB New namings may only be added to this list below after official publication as the preannouncement of names is condemned. The WGSBN publishes a comprehensive guideline for the naming rules of non-cometary small Solar System bodies.

Named minor planet	Provisional	This minor planet was named for...	Ref · Catalog
738926 Nitschelm	2017 DK_{47}	Christian Nitschelm, French astronomer.	IAU · 738926
