= List of minor planets: 870001–871000 =

The following is a partial list of minor planets, running from minor-planet number 870001 through 871000, inclusive. The primary data for this and other partial lists is based on JPL's "Small-Body Orbital Elements" and data available from the Minor Planet Center. Critical list information is also provided by the MPC, unless otherwise specified from Lowell Observatory. A detailed description of the table's columns and additional sources are given on the main page including a complete list of every page in this series, and a statistical break-up on the dynamical classification of minor planets.

Also see the summary list of all named bodies in numerical and alphabetical order, and the corresponding naming citations for the number range of this particular list. New namings may only be added to this list after official publication, as the preannouncement of names is condemned by the Working Group for Small Bodies Nomenclature of the International Astronomical Union.

Near-Earth obj.	MBA (inner)	MBA (outer)	Centaur
Mars-crosser	MBA (middle)	Jupiter trojan	Trans-Neptunian obj.
Unclassified

== 870001–870100 ==
Designation			Discovery			Properties		Ref
Permanent	Provisional	Named after	Date	Site	Discoverer(s)	Category	Diam.	Ref
870001	2016 UU_{50}	—	October 21, 2007	Mount Lemmon	Mount Lemmon Survey	·	1.3 km	MPC · JPL
870002	2016 UQ_{54}	—	November 2, 2007	Mount Lemmon	Mount Lemmon Survey	GEF	890 m	MPC · JPL
870003	2016 UD_{55}	—	October 26, 2016	Kitt Peak	Spacewatch	·	1.3 km	MPC · JPL
870004	2016 UQ_{55}	—	September 19, 1995	Kitt Peak	Spacewatch	(5)	770 m	MPC · JPL
870005	2016 US_{55}	—	February 15, 2013	Haleakala	Pan-STARRS 1	DOR	1.6 km	MPC · JPL
870006	2016 UQ_{56}	—	November 1, 2008	Mount Lemmon	Mount Lemmon Survey	H	340 m	MPC · JPL
870007	2016 UR_{56}	—	October 26, 2016	Haleakala	Pan-STARRS 1	·	1.5 km	MPC · JPL
870008	2016 UT_{56}	—	October 26, 2016	Haleakala	Pan-STARRS 1	·	1.6 km	MPC · JPL
870009	2016 UJ_{57}	—	October 27, 2016	WISE	WISE	·	1.7 km	MPC · JPL
870010	2016 UO_{58}	—	October 19, 2016	Mount Lemmon	Mount Lemmon Survey	·	1.5 km	MPC · JPL
870011	2016 UW_{58}	—	October 25, 2016	Haleakala	Pan-STARRS 1	·	1.3 km	MPC · JPL
870012	2016 UQ_{64}	—	October 9, 2007	Kitt Peak	Spacewatch	JUN	830 m	MPC · JPL
870013	2016 UY_{65}	—	May 21, 2015	Haleakala	Pan-STARRS 1	·	1.4 km	MPC · JPL
870014	2016 UZ_{65}	—	October 1, 2016	Mount Lemmon	Mount Lemmon Survey	EOS	1.5 km	MPC · JPL
870015	2016 UQ_{67}	—	September 13, 2007	Mount Lemmon	Mount Lemmon Survey	·	1.0 km	MPC · JPL
870016	2016 UL_{68}	—	July 31, 2005	Palomar	NEAT	·	690 m	MPC · JPL
870017	2016 UG_{72}	—	October 18, 2007	Mount Lemmon	Mount Lemmon Survey	fast	1.2 km	MPC · JPL
870018	2016 UH_{72}	—	January 24, 2006	Kitt Peak	Spacewatch	·	690 m	MPC · JPL
870019	2016 UN_{73}	—	November 9, 2007	Kitt Peak	Spacewatch	·	1.5 km	MPC · JPL
870020	2016 UK_{74}	—	October 12, 2007	Kitt Peak	Spacewatch	·	1.2 km	MPC · JPL
870021	2016 UJ_{76}	—	October 26, 2016	Mount Lemmon	Mount Lemmon Survey	·	790 m	MPC · JPL
870022	2016 UL_{76}	—	October 26, 2016	Mount Lemmon	Mount Lemmon Survey	·	1.5 km	MPC · JPL
870023	2016 UG_{77}	—	September 26, 2007	Mount Lemmon	Mount Lemmon Survey	·	1.4 km	MPC · JPL
870024	2016 UV_{78}	—	November 12, 2012	Mount Lemmon	Mount Lemmon Survey	·	750 m	MPC · JPL
870025	2016 UN_{80}	—	June 29, 1995	Kitt Peak	Spacewatch	·	780 m	MPC · JPL
870026	2016 UQ_{80}	—	December 7, 2012	Haleakala	Pan-STARRS 1	·	1.1 km	MPC · JPL
870027	2016 UR_{80}	—	June 15, 2007	Kitt Peak	Spacewatch	·	1.3 km	MPC · JPL
870028	2016 UT_{80}	—	October 29, 2016	Mount Lemmon	Mount Lemmon Survey	AMO	550 m	MPC · JPL
870029	2016 UY_{80}	—	October 30, 2011	Kitt Peak	Spacewatch	·	1.2 km	MPC · JPL
870030	2016 UG_{83}	—	October 23, 1998	Kitt Peak	Spacewatch	fast	690 m	MPC · JPL
870031	2016 UZ_{83}	—	September 18, 2007	Mount Lemmon	Mount Lemmon Survey	GEF	920 m	MPC · JPL
870032	2016 UR_{84}	—	August 27, 2005	Palomar	NEAT	NYS	560 m	MPC · JPL
870033	2016 UE_{86}	—	November 16, 2009	Kitt Peak	Spacewatch	·	620 m	MPC · JPL
870034	2016 UQ_{87}	—	October 20, 2007	Kitt Peak	Spacewatch	·	1.4 km	MPC · JPL
870035	2016 UH_{90}	—	September 18, 2012	Mount Lemmon	Mount Lemmon Survey	(6769)	940 m	MPC · JPL
870036	2016 UE_{91}	—	September 21, 2003	Kitt Peak	Spacewatch	·	1.0 km	MPC · JPL
870037	2016 UL_{92}	—	October 19, 2016	Mount Lemmon	Mount Lemmon Survey	AEO	650 m	MPC · JPL
870038	2016 UO_{92}	—	November 24, 2011	Haleakala	Pan-STARRS 1	·	1.9 km	MPC · JPL
870039	2016 UX_{92}	—	August 14, 2012	Haleakala	Pan-STARRS 1	·	720 m	MPC · JPL
870040	2016 UJ_{98}	—	October 26, 2016	Kitt Peak	Spacewatch	·	1.3 km	MPC · JPL
870041	2016 UN_{98}	—	September 30, 2016	Haleakala	Pan-STARRS 1	·	800 m	MPC · JPL
870042	2016 UT_{100}	—	November 30, 2011	Haleakala	Pan-STARRS 1	H	330 m	MPC · JPL
870043	2016 UL_{101}	—	March 10, 2000	Socorro	LINEAR	T_{j} (2.92)	3.0 km	MPC · JPL
870044	2016 UZ_{101}	—	September 30, 2016	Haleakala	Pan-STARRS 1	GEF	1.0 km	MPC · JPL
870045	2016 UX_{102}	—	November 8, 2009	Kitt Peak	Spacewatch	·	640 m	MPC · JPL
870046	2016 UF_{103}	—	May 10, 2015	Mount Lemmon	Mount Lemmon Survey	MIS	1.7 km	MPC · JPL
870047	2016 UB_{105}	—	November 8, 2007	Kitt Peak	Spacewatch	·	1.3 km	MPC · JPL
870048	2016 UK_{105}	—	November 11, 2007	Mount Lemmon	Mount Lemmon Survey	·	1.2 km	MPC · JPL
870049	2016 UW_{105}	—	October 27, 2016	Mount Lemmon	Mount Lemmon Survey	·	910 m	MPC · JPL
870050	2016 UZ_{105}	—	October 13, 2005	Kitt Peak	Spacewatch	·	860 m	MPC · JPL
870051	2016 UP_{106}	—	September 20, 2011	Haleakala	Pan-STARRS 1	·	1.2 km	MPC · JPL
870052	2016 UK_{108}	—	August 31, 2005	Kitt Peak	Spacewatch	MAS	490 m	MPC · JPL
870053	2016 UK_{110}	—	October 12, 2007	Kitt Peak	Spacewatch	·	1.0 km	MPC · JPL
870054	2016 UH_{113}	—	September 20, 2011	Mount Lemmon	Mount Lemmon Survey	·	1.3 km	MPC · JPL
870055	2016 UD_{114}	—	June 19, 2015	Haleakala	Pan-STARRS 1	·	1.9 km	MPC · JPL
870056	2016 UV_{114}	—	December 23, 2012	Haleakala	Pan-STARRS 1	·	1.3 km	MPC · JPL
870057	2016 UJ_{116}	—	April 23, 2015	Haleakala	Pan-STARRS 1	·	780 m	MPC · JPL
870058	2016 UK_{116}	—	April 23, 2015	Haleakala	Pan-STARRS 1	·	960 m	MPC · JPL
870059	2016 UL_{118}	—	November 15, 2006	Kitt Peak	Spacewatch	EOS	1.1 km	MPC · JPL
870060	2016 UX_{124}	—	October 19, 1999	Kitt Peak	Spacewatch	·	960 m	MPC · JPL
870061	2016 UG_{126}	—	October 27, 2016	Haleakala	Pan-STARRS 1	AGN	830 m	MPC · JPL
870062	2016 UN_{127}	—	November 8, 2013	Mount Lemmon	Mount Lemmon Survey	·	410 m	MPC · JPL
870063	2016 UO_{130}	—	February 28, 2014	Haleakala	Pan-STARRS 1	·	920 m	MPC · JPL
870064	2016 UA_{133}	—	October 27, 2016	Haleakala	Pan-STARRS 1	·	1.3 km	MPC · JPL
870065	2016 UR_{136}	—	November 21, 2009	Kitt Peak	Spacewatch	NYS	770 m	MPC · JPL
870066	2016 UA_{139}	—	February 3, 2013	Haleakala	Pan-STARRS 1	·	1.5 km	MPC · JPL
870067	2016 UB_{141}	—	October 29, 2016	Mount Lemmon	Mount Lemmon Survey	·	2.2 km	MPC · JPL
870068	2016 UE_{141}	—	October 23, 2011	Haleakala	Pan-STARRS 1	·	1.5 km	MPC · JPL
870069	2016 UP_{141}	—	October 6, 2016	Haleakala	Pan-STARRS 1	·	1.3 km	MPC · JPL
870070	2016 UE_{142}	—	August 14, 2012	Haleakala	Pan-STARRS 1	·	1.1 km	MPC · JPL
870071	2016 UD_{143}	—	October 21, 2007	Mount Lemmon	Mount Lemmon Survey	·	1.3 km	MPC · JPL
870072	2016 UN_{144}	—	September 19, 2009	Kitt Peak	Spacewatch	·	610 m	MPC · JPL
870073	2016 UM_{145}	—	September 26, 2016	Haleakala	Pan-STARRS 1	NYS	810 m	MPC · JPL
870074	2016 UN_{145}	—	October 16, 2003	Kitt Peak	Spacewatch	·	1.3 km	MPC · JPL
870075	2016 UU_{145}	—	September 6, 2016	Mount Lemmon	Mount Lemmon Survey	·	1.1 km	MPC · JPL
870076	2016 UV_{145}	—	November 19, 2003	Kitt Peak	Spacewatch	ADE	1.4 km	MPC · JPL
870077	2016 UR_{146}	—	September 30, 2005	Palomar	NEAT	·	1.8 km	MPC · JPL
870078	2016 US_{147}	—	October 31, 2016	Mount Lemmon	Mount Lemmon Survey	·	1.4 km	MPC · JPL
870079	2016 UH_{150}	—	October 21, 2016	Mount Lemmon	Mount Lemmon Survey	·	2.3 km	MPC · JPL
870080	2016 UM_{150}	—	October 21, 2016	Mount Lemmon	Mount Lemmon Survey	·	2.1 km	MPC · JPL
870081	2016 UV_{150}	—	October 28, 2016	Haleakala	Pan-STARRS 1	·	1.4 km	MPC · JPL
870082	2016 UP_{151}	—	October 22, 2016	Kitt Peak	Spacewatch	·	1.5 km	MPC · JPL
870083	2016 UV_{151}	—	October 31, 2016	Mount Lemmon	Mount Lemmon Survey	EUN	960 m	MPC · JPL
870084	2016 UW_{152}	—	October 25, 2016	Haleakala	Pan-STARRS 1	NYS	790 m	MPC · JPL
870085	2016 UY_{152}	—	October 28, 2016	Haleakala	Pan-STARRS 1	·	670 m	MPC · JPL
870086	2016 UA_{153}	—	October 21, 2016	Mount Lemmon	Mount Lemmon Survey	(18466)	1.7 km	MPC · JPL
870087	2016 UB_{153}	—	November 25, 2005	Kitt Peak	Spacewatch	·	2.2 km	MPC · JPL
870088	2016 UF_{153}	—	October 28, 2016	Haleakala	Pan-STARRS 1	·	970 m	MPC · JPL
870089	2016 UH_{155}	—	May 6, 2006	Mount Lemmon	Mount Lemmon Survey	·	1.8 km	MPC · JPL
870090	2016 UO_{163}	—	January 24, 2014	Haleakala	Pan-STARRS 1	NYS	670 m	MPC · JPL
870091	2016 UW_{170}	—	April 2, 2019	Haleakala	Pan-STARRS 1	·	1.1 km	MPC · JPL
870092	2016 UT_{175}	—	November 5, 2007	Mount Lemmon	Mount Lemmon Survey	·	1.2 km	MPC · JPL
870093	2016 UM_{185}	—	April 4, 2014	Haleakala	Pan-STARRS 1	·	1.6 km	MPC · JPL
870094	2016 UP_{187}	—	December 24, 2017	Haleakala	Pan-STARRS 1	·	1.1 km	MPC · JPL
870095	2016 UN_{195}	—	February 17, 2013	Kitt Peak	Spacewatch	THM	1.5 km	MPC · JPL
870096	2016 UG_{227}	—	May 21, 2015	Haleakala	Pan-STARRS 1	·	1.2 km	MPC · JPL
870097	2016 UQ_{228}	—	April 25, 2014	Mount Lemmon	Mount Lemmon Survey	·	1.3 km	MPC · JPL
870098	2016 UB_{245}	—	December 23, 2017	Haleakala	Pan-STARRS 1	THM	1.5 km	MPC · JPL
870099	2016 UE_{246}	—	October 26, 2016	Haleakala	Pan-STARRS 1	BRA	1.0 km	MPC · JPL
870100	2016 UL_{246}	—	October 28, 2016	Haleakala	Pan-STARRS 1	·	1.7 km	MPC · JPL

== 870101–870200 ==
back to top

Designation			Discovery			Properties		Ref
Permanent	Provisional	Named after	Date	Site	Discoverer(s)	Category	Diam.	Ref
870101	2016 UA_{247}	—	October 25, 2016	Haleakala	Pan-STARRS 1	·	1.7 km	MPC · JPL
870102	2016 UG_{248}	—	October 27, 2016	Mount Lemmon	Mount Lemmon Survey	·	1.0 km	MPC · JPL
870103	2016 UK_{248}	—	October 21, 2016	Mount Lemmon	Mount Lemmon Survey	·	1.2 km	MPC · JPL
870104	2016 UT_{248}	—	October 28, 2016	Haleakala	Pan-STARRS 1	·	2.2 km	MPC · JPL
870105	2016 UJ_{249}	—	October 19, 2016	Mount Lemmon	Mount Lemmon Survey	·	1.3 km	MPC · JPL
870106	2016 UK_{249}	—	October 27, 2016	Kitt Peak	Spacewatch	DOR	1.8 km	MPC · JPL
870107	2016 UY_{249}	—	October 25, 2016	Haleakala	Pan-STARRS 1	·	1.2 km	MPC · JPL
870108	2016 UC_{250}	—	February 14, 2013	Haleakala	Pan-STARRS 1	·	1.3 km	MPC · JPL
870109	2016 UL_{250}	—	October 21, 2016	Mount Lemmon	Mount Lemmon Survey	·	1.0 km	MPC · JPL
870110	2016 UT_{250}	—	October 20, 2016	Mount Lemmon	Mount Lemmon Survey	·	1.4 km	MPC · JPL
870111	2016 UU_{250}	—	October 20, 2016	Mount Lemmon	Mount Lemmon Survey	·	1.1 km	MPC · JPL
870112	2016 UY_{250}	—	October 24, 2016	Mount Lemmon	Mount Lemmon Survey	·	1.2 km	MPC · JPL
870113	2016 UE_{251}	—	October 29, 2016	Mount Lemmon	Mount Lemmon Survey	·	1.3 km	MPC · JPL
870114	2016 UF_{252}	—	October 19, 2016	Mount Lemmon	Mount Lemmon Survey	·	1.5 km	MPC · JPL
870115	2016 UR_{253}	—	October 28, 2016	Haleakala	Pan-STARRS 1	·	2.1 km	MPC · JPL
870116	2016 UV_{253}	—	October 26, 2016	Kitt Peak	Spacewatch	·	1.0 km	MPC · JPL
870117	2016 UM_{254}	—	October 26, 2016	Mount Lemmon	Mount Lemmon Survey	·	1.5 km	MPC · JPL
870118	2016 UY_{254}	—	October 28, 2016	Haleakala	Pan-STARRS 1	·	800 m	MPC · JPL
870119	2016 UM_{256}	—	October 19, 2016	Mount Lemmon	Mount Lemmon Survey	·	1.2 km	MPC · JPL
870120	2016 UR_{256}	—	October 28, 2016	Haleakala	Pan-STARRS 1	·	1.0 km	MPC · JPL
870121	2016 UH_{257}	—	October 25, 2016	Haleakala	Pan-STARRS 1	·	1.3 km	MPC · JPL
870122	2016 UM_{258}	—	October 26, 2016	Haleakala	Pan-STARRS 1	EUN	760 m	MPC · JPL
870123	2016 UK_{262}	—	October 28, 2016	Haleakala	Pan-STARRS 1	PHO	560 m	MPC · JPL
870124	2016 UR_{262}	—	October 28, 2016	Haleakala	Pan-STARRS 1	H	390 m	MPC · JPL
870125	2016 UT_{262}	—	October 29, 2016	Mount Lemmon	Mount Lemmon Survey	·	820 m	MPC · JPL
870126	2016 UF_{265}	—	October 24, 2016	Mount Lemmon	Mount Lemmon Survey	·	2.4 km	MPC · JPL
870127	2016 UJ_{266}	—	October 25, 2016	Haleakala	Pan-STARRS 1	·	540 m	MPC · JPL
870128	2016 UP_{267}	—	October 26, 2016	Haleakala	Pan-STARRS 1	GEF	850 m	MPC · JPL
870129	2016 UC_{269}	—	October 22, 2016	Mount Lemmon	Mount Lemmon Survey	·	1.4 km	MPC · JPL
870130	2016 UP_{269}	—	October 19, 2016	Mount Lemmon	Mount Lemmon Survey	·	1.5 km	MPC · JPL
870131	2016 UU_{270}	—	October 25, 2016	Haleakala	Pan-STARRS 1	·	1.8 km	MPC · JPL
870132	2016 UV_{270}	—	October 25, 2016	Mount Lemmon	Mount Lemmon Survey	·	1.7 km	MPC · JPL
870133	2016 UB_{273}	—	October 25, 2016	Haleakala	Pan-STARRS 1	·	2.4 km	MPC · JPL
870134	2016 UJ_{273}	—	October 24, 2016	Mount Lemmon	Mount Lemmon Survey	H	430 m	MPC · JPL
870135	2016 UV_{273}	—	October 26, 2016	Haleakala	Pan-STARRS 1	THM	1.6 km	MPC · JPL
870136	2016 US_{274}	—	October 20, 2016	Mount Lemmon	Mount Lemmon Survey	·	1.4 km	MPC · JPL
870137	2016 UX_{276}	—	October 25, 2016	Haleakala	Pan-STARRS 1	·	1.3 km	MPC · JPL
870138	2016 UO_{278}	—	October 25, 2016	Haleakala	Pan-STARRS 1	·	1.2 km	MPC · JPL
870139	2016 UY_{278}	—	October 29, 2016	Mount Lemmon	Mount Lemmon Survey	·	1.7 km	MPC · JPL
870140	2016 UV_{279}	—	October 27, 2016	Kitt Peak	Spacewatch	·	1.4 km	MPC · JPL
870141	2016 UH_{280}	—	October 20, 2016	Mount Lemmon	Mount Lemmon Survey	HOF	1.7 km	MPC · JPL
870142	2016 UY_{280}	—	October 4, 2016	Mount Lemmon	Mount Lemmon Survey	·	1.3 km	MPC · JPL
870143	2016 UJ_{283}	—	October 25, 2016	Haleakala	Pan-STARRS 1	MIS	1.7 km	MPC · JPL
870144	2016 UX_{284}	—	October 27, 2016	Mount Lemmon	Mount Lemmon Survey	·	1.5 km	MPC · JPL
870145	2016 VJ_{5}	—	August 24, 2011	Haleakala	Pan-STARRS 1	·	880 m	MPC · JPL
870146	2016 VJ_{6}	—	July 4, 2016	Haleakala	Pan-STARRS 1	·	2.2 km	MPC · JPL
870147	2016 VZ_{6}	—	September 19, 2003	Palomar	NEAT	·	1.4 km	MPC · JPL
870148	2016 VS_{7}	—	October 26, 2011	Haleakala	Pan-STARRS 1	·	1.6 km	MPC · JPL
870149	2016 VZ_{7}	—	January 13, 2008	Catalina	CSS	·	1.3 km	MPC · JPL
870150	2016 VA_{8}	—	November 6, 2016	Palomar	Palomar Transient Factory	·	3.2 km	MPC · JPL
870151	2016 VC_{8}	—	September 11, 2016	Mount Lemmon	Mount Lemmon Survey	BAR	710 m	MPC · JPL
870152	2016 VF_{8}	—	October 8, 2016	Haleakala	Pan-STARRS 1	·	870 m	MPC · JPL
870153	2016 VW_{13}	—	December 10, 2009	Mount Lemmon	Mount Lemmon Survey	V	420 m	MPC · JPL
870154	2016 VA_{14}	—	October 29, 2016	Mount Lemmon	Mount Lemmon Survey	·	1.6 km	MPC · JPL
870155	2016 VY_{14}	—	October 23, 2016	Mount Lemmon	Mount Lemmon Survey	EUN	910 m	MPC · JPL
870156	2016 VQ_{15}	—	January 29, 2012	Mount Lemmon	Mount Lemmon Survey	·	1.6 km	MPC · JPL
870157	2016 VL_{16}	—	September 27, 2016	Haleakala	Pan-STARRS 1	·	880 m	MPC · JPL
870158	2016 VJ_{20}	—	January 10, 2013	Haleakala	Pan-STARRS 1	·	1.4 km	MPC · JPL
870159	2016 VW_{21}	—	November 8, 2016	Haleakala	Pan-STARRS 1	H	380 m	MPC · JPL
870160	2016 VM_{22}	—	November 10, 2016	Haleakala	Pan-STARRS 1	HNS	740 m	MPC · JPL
870161	2016 VX_{22}	—	November 4, 2016	Haleakala	Pan-STARRS 1	ADE	1.3 km	MPC · JPL
870162	2016 VC_{23}	—	November 3, 2016	Haleakala	Pan-STARRS 1	·	940 m	MPC · JPL
870163	2016 VG_{23}	—	November 4, 2016	Haleakala	Pan-STARRS 1	JUN	720 m	MPC · JPL
870164	2016 VO_{23}	—	November 9, 2016	Mount Lemmon	Mount Lemmon Survey	H	400 m	MPC · JPL
870165	2016 VB_{24}	—	November 9, 2016	Oukaïmeden	M. Ory	·	1.6 km	MPC · JPL
870166	2016 VU_{25}	—	November 6, 2016	Mount Lemmon	Mount Lemmon Survey	·	1.3 km	MPC · JPL
870167	2016 VR_{26}	—	November 9, 2016	Mount Lemmon	Mount Lemmon Survey	H	370 m	MPC · JPL
870168	2016 VB_{27}	—	October 27, 2016	Mount Lemmon	Mount Lemmon Survey	·	1.5 km	MPC · JPL
870169	2016 VU_{27}	—	November 5, 2016	Mount Lemmon	Mount Lemmon Survey	·	1.2 km	MPC · JPL
870170	2016 VD_{29}	—	September 26, 2003	Sacramento Peak	SDSS	·	920 m	MPC · JPL
870171	2016 VW_{29}	—	November 7, 2016	Kitt Peak	Spacewatch	·	2.1 km	MPC · JPL
870172	2016 VP_{30}	—	November 3, 2016	Haleakala	Pan-STARRS 1	·	1.5 km	MPC · JPL
870173	2016 VR_{30}	—	November 4, 2016	Haleakala	Pan-STARRS 1	·	1.6 km	MPC · JPL
870174	2016 VF_{31}	—	November 5, 2016	Haleakala	Pan-STARRS 1	·	1.3 km	MPC · JPL
870175	2016 VJ_{31}	—	November 5, 2016	Mount Lemmon	Mount Lemmon Survey	·	1.5 km	MPC · JPL
870176	2016 VO_{31}	—	November 5, 2016	Haleakala	Pan-STARRS 1	·	1.6 km	MPC · JPL
870177	2016 VF_{32}	—	November 6, 2016	Haleakala	Pan-STARRS 1	·	2.3 km	MPC · JPL
870178	2016 VB_{33}	—	November 6, 2016	Mount Lemmon	Mount Lemmon Survey	·	1.3 km	MPC · JPL
870179	2016 VC_{33}	—	November 7, 2016	Mount Lemmon	Mount Lemmon Survey	AGN	760 m	MPC · JPL
870180	2016 VO_{33}	—	November 4, 2016	Haleakala	Pan-STARRS 1	·	1.1 km	MPC · JPL
870181	2016 VE_{34}	—	November 10, 2016	Haleakala	Pan-STARRS 1	NAE	1.8 km	MPC · JPL
870182	2016 VP_{35}	—	November 4, 2016	Haleakala	Pan-STARRS 1	·	800 m	MPC · JPL
870183	2016 VQ_{35}	—	November 5, 2016	Mount Lemmon	Mount Lemmon Survey	HNS	870 m	MPC · JPL
870184	2016 VG_{36}	—	November 4, 2016	Haleakala	Pan-STARRS 1	·	1.5 km	MPC · JPL
870185	2016 VH_{36}	—	September 20, 2007	Kitt Peak	Spacewatch	·	1.0 km	MPC · JPL
870186	2016 VC_{38}	—	November 6, 2016	Kitt Peak	Spacewatch	·	880 m	MPC · JPL
870187	2016 VR_{39}	—	November 5, 2016	Mount Lemmon	Mount Lemmon Survey	·	1.1 km	MPC · JPL
870188	2016 VW_{41}	—	November 6, 2016	Kitt Peak	Spacewatch	·	870 m	MPC · JPL
870189	2016 VJ_{42}	—	November 11, 2016	Mount Lemmon	Mount Lemmon Survey	HNS	810 m	MPC · JPL
870190	2016 VQ_{42}	—	November 3, 2016	Haleakala	Pan-STARRS 1	·	910 m	MPC · JPL
870191	2016 VA_{44}	—	November 5, 2016	Mount Lemmon	Mount Lemmon Survey	·	700 m	MPC · JPL
870192	2016 VL_{45}	—	November 10, 2016	Haleakala	Pan-STARRS 1	·	1.4 km	MPC · JPL
870193	2016 VB_{47}	—	November 4, 2016	Haleakala	Pan-STARRS 1	·	460 m	MPC · JPL
870194	2016 VC_{47}	—	November 11, 2016	Mount Lemmon	Mount Lemmon Survey	·	610 m	MPC · JPL
870195	2016 VK_{47}	—	October 8, 2016	Haleakala	Pan-STARRS 1	·	1.2 km	MPC · JPL
870196	2016 VS_{47}	—	November 10, 2016	Haleakala	Pan-STARRS 1	·	1.6 km	MPC · JPL
870197	2016 VU_{56}	—	November 1, 2006	Mount Lemmon	Mount Lemmon Survey	BRA	1.1 km	MPC · JPL
870198	2016 VQ_{58}	—	November 6, 2016	Haleakala	Pan-STARRS 1	H	340 m	MPC · JPL
870199	2016 VV_{58}	—	November 10, 2016	Haleakala	Pan-STARRS 1	·	1.5 km	MPC · JPL
870200	2016 VJ_{59}	—	November 10, 2016	Mount Lemmon	Mount Lemmon Survey	·	1.4 km	MPC · JPL

== 870201–870300 ==
back to top

Designation			Discovery			Properties		Ref
Permanent	Provisional	Named after	Date	Site	Discoverer(s)	Category	Diam.	Ref
870201	2016 VA_{60}	—	October 24, 2011	Haleakala	Pan-STARRS 1	·	1.4 km	MPC · JPL
870202	2016 VB_{60}	—	November 7, 2016	Mount Lemmon	Mount Lemmon Survey	·	800 m	MPC · JPL
870203	2016 VV_{63}	—	November 4, 2016	Haleakala	Pan-STARRS 1	LIX	2.3 km	MPC · JPL
870204	2016 WK_{1}	—	December 9, 2004	Kitt Peak	Spacewatch	BAR	1.1 km	MPC · JPL
870205	2016 WK_{3}	—	January 17, 2013	Mount Lemmon	Mount Lemmon Survey	·	930 m	MPC · JPL
870206	2016 WQ_{4}	—	October 26, 2016	Haleakala	Pan-STARRS 1	·	890 m	MPC · JPL
870207	2016 WX_{7}	—	November 4, 2016	Haleakala	Pan-STARRS 1	H	380 m	MPC · JPL
870208	2016 WN_{9}	—	October 30, 2011	Mount Lemmon	Mount Lemmon Survey	·	1.6 km	MPC · JPL
870209	2016 WQ_{9}	—	January 20, 2013	Mount Lemmon	Mount Lemmon Survey	·	1.4 km	MPC · JPL
870210	2016 WT_{10}	—	January 1, 2009	Mount Lemmon	Mount Lemmon Survey	·	1.1 km	MPC · JPL
870211	2016 WB_{11}	—	November 28, 2013	Mount Lemmon	Mount Lemmon Survey	·	610 m	MPC · JPL
870212	2016 WC_{12}	—	September 2, 2011	Haleakala	Pan-STARRS 1	·	1.5 km	MPC · JPL
870213	2016 WZ_{12}	—	November 3, 2011	Mount Lemmon	Mount Lemmon Survey	·	1.6 km	MPC · JPL
870214	2016 WY_{14}	—	November 18, 2016	Mount Lemmon	Mount Lemmon Survey	NYS	780 m	MPC · JPL
870215	2016 WG_{15}	—	November 3, 2007	Kitt Peak	Spacewatch	·	1.6 km	MPC · JPL
870216	2016 WJ_{15}	—	November 25, 2005	Kitt Peak	Spacewatch	·	810 m	MPC · JPL
870217	2016 WD_{17}	—	June 10, 2007	Kitt Peak	Spacewatch	·	970 m	MPC · JPL
870218	2016 WN_{17}	—	October 5, 2016	Mount Lemmon	Mount Lemmon Survey	·	1.4 km	MPC · JPL
870219	2016 WU_{17}	—	October 13, 2016	Haleakala	Pan-STARRS 1	·	990 m	MPC · JPL
870220	2016 WF_{19}	—	September 30, 1997	Kitt Peak	Spacewatch	MAS	480 m	MPC · JPL
870221	2016 WK_{20}	—	January 26, 2001	Sacramento Peak	SDSS	·	1.1 km	MPC · JPL
870222	2016 WZ_{20}	—	March 3, 2009	Mount Lemmon	Mount Lemmon Survey	·	1.5 km	MPC · JPL
870223	2016 WW_{21}	—	October 9, 2007	Kitt Peak	Spacewatch	·	1.3 km	MPC · JPL
870224	2016 WF_{23}	—	July 12, 2005	Mount Lemmon	Mount Lemmon Survey	·	800 m	MPC · JPL
870225	2016 WH_{24}	—	December 12, 2012	Mount Lemmon	Mount Lemmon Survey	·	1.1 km	MPC · JPL
870226	2016 WS_{24}	—	October 12, 2016	Mount Lemmon	Mount Lemmon Survey	H	370 m	MPC · JPL
870227	2016 WU_{25}	—	November 1, 2011	Kitt Peak	Spacewatch	·	1.4 km	MPC · JPL
870228	2016 WU_{26}	—	August 25, 2003	Cerro Tololo	Deep Ecliptic Survey	BRG	970 m	MPC · JPL
870229	2016 WO_{27}	—	November 4, 2016	Haleakala	Pan-STARRS 1	DOR	1.9 km	MPC · JPL
870230	2016 WU_{29}	—	December 8, 2012	Nogales	M. Schwartz, P. R. Holvorcem	·	710 m	MPC · JPL
870231	2016 WX_{29}	—	October 28, 2016	Haleakala	Pan-STARRS 1	·	1.3 km	MPC · JPL
870232	2016 WC_{30}	—	September 8, 2011	Kitt Peak	Spacewatch	·	1.1 km	MPC · JPL
870233	2016 WJ_{30}	—	December 23, 2012	Haleakala	Pan-STARRS 1	·	1.4 km	MPC · JPL
870234	2016 WH_{31}	—	June 11, 2015	Haleakala	Pan-STARRS 1	PHO	650 m	MPC · JPL
870235	2016 WD_{32}	—	December 7, 2005	Kitt Peak	Spacewatch	THB	1.8 km	MPC · JPL
870236	2016 WS_{32}	—	December 23, 2012	Haleakala	Pan-STARRS 1	·	900 m	MPC · JPL
870237	2016 WY_{32}	—	January 20, 2009	Mount Lemmon	Mount Lemmon Survey	·	950 m	MPC · JPL
870238	2016 WZ_{34}	—	March 4, 2013	Haleakala	Pan-STARRS 1	·	1.6 km	MPC · JPL
870239	2016 WZ_{36}	—	December 16, 2007	Kitt Peak	Spacewatch	·	1.3 km	MPC · JPL
870240	2016 WD_{38}	—	August 24, 2011	Haleakala	Pan-STARRS 1	·	1.1 km	MPC · JPL
870241	2016 WK_{38}	—	October 26, 2016	Haleakala	Pan-STARRS 1	·	1.6 km	MPC · JPL
870242	2016 WZ_{39}	—	December 30, 2011	Mount Lemmon	Mount Lemmon Survey	·	2.2 km	MPC · JPL
870243	2016 WF_{41}	—	October 4, 2012	Mount Lemmon	Mount Lemmon Survey	MAS	540 m	MPC · JPL
870244	2016 WE_{42}	—	September 21, 2011	Kitt Peak	Spacewatch	·	1.4 km	MPC · JPL
870245	2016 WR_{42}	—	October 26, 2005	Kitt Peak	Spacewatch	NYS	750 m	MPC · JPL
870246	2016 WH_{43}	—	April 5, 2014	Haleakala	Pan-STARRS 1	EOS	1.5 km	MPC · JPL
870247	2016 WW_{43}	—	November 5, 2002	Palomar	NEAT	·	1.5 km	MPC · JPL
870248	2016 WB_{46}	—	October 16, 2007	Mount Lemmon	Mount Lemmon Survey	·	1.3 km	MPC · JPL
870249	2016 WK_{46}	—	October 23, 2016	Mount Lemmon	Mount Lemmon Survey	·	1.3 km	MPC · JPL
870250	2016 WR_{49}	—	September 11, 2001	Kitt Peak	Spacewatch	MAS	500 m	MPC · JPL
870251	2016 WF_{51}	—	November 15, 2007	Catalina	CSS	·	1.4 km	MPC · JPL
870252	2016 WW_{51}	—	October 7, 2016	Mount Lemmon	Mount Lemmon Survey	·	1.2 km	MPC · JPL
870253	2016 WH_{53}	—	November 12, 2007	Mount Lemmon	Mount Lemmon Survey	·	1.2 km	MPC · JPL
870254	2016 WQ_{53}	—	December 29, 2008	Kitt Peak	Spacewatch	·	840 m	MPC · JPL
870255	2016 WN_{54}	—	April 12, 2015	Haleakala	Pan-STARRS 1	H	430 m	MPC · JPL
870256	2016 WD_{56}	—	November 5, 2016	Mount Lemmon	Mount Lemmon Survey	·	1.5 km	MPC · JPL
870257	2016 WL_{57}	—	February 26, 2012	Haleakala	Pan-STARRS 1	·	1.8 km	MPC · JPL
870258	2016 WT_{58}	—	November 18, 2016	Mount Lemmon	Mount Lemmon Survey	·	1.9 km	MPC · JPL
870259	2016 WE_{60}	—	November 23, 2016	Mount Lemmon	Mount Lemmon Survey	H	680 m	MPC · JPL
870260	2016 WS_{61}	—	November 19, 2016	Mount Lemmon	Mount Lemmon Survey	·	990 m	MPC · JPL
870261	2016 WW_{61}	—	November 27, 2016	Haleakala	Pan-STARRS 1	H	350 m	MPC · JPL
870262	2016 WT_{62}	—	November 23, 2016	Mount Lemmon	Mount Lemmon Survey	·	1.4 km	MPC · JPL
870263	2016 WN_{63}	—	November 25, 2016	Mount Lemmon	Mount Lemmon Survey	·	910 m	MPC · JPL
870264	2016 WY_{63}	—	November 25, 2016	Mount Lemmon	Mount Lemmon Survey	·	1.6 km	MPC · JPL
870265	2016 WA_{64}	—	November 25, 2016	Mount Lemmon	Mount Lemmon Survey	·	1.7 km	MPC · JPL
870266	2016 WN_{64}	—	October 9, 2007	Mount Lemmon	Mount Lemmon Survey	·	1.1 km	MPC · JPL
870267	2016 WQ_{64}	—	November 19, 2016	Mount Lemmon	Mount Lemmon Survey	·	1.3 km	MPC · JPL
870268	2016 WY_{64}	—	November 25, 2016	Mount Lemmon	Mount Lemmon Survey	·	1.3 km	MPC · JPL
870269	2016 WB_{65}	—	July 19, 2015	Haleakala	Pan-STARRS 1	AGN	710 m	MPC · JPL
870270	2016 WH_{65}	—	November 25, 2016	Mount Lemmon	Mount Lemmon Survey	·	1.3 km	MPC · JPL
870271	2016 WA_{67}	—	November 23, 2016	Mount Lemmon	Mount Lemmon Survey	EUN	810 m	MPC · JPL
870272	2016 WU_{68}	—	November 26, 2016	Haleakala	Pan-STARRS 1	·	1.6 km	MPC · JPL
870273	2016 WV_{69}	—	November 25, 2016	Mount Lemmon	Mount Lemmon Survey	(5)	870 m	MPC · JPL
870274	2016 WZ_{78}	—	September 27, 2011	Mayhill-ISON	L. Elenin	·	1.2 km	MPC · JPL
870275	2016 WQ_{79}	—	November 20, 2016	Mount Lemmon	Mount Lemmon Survey	·	1.8 km	MPC · JPL
870276	2016 WM_{81}	—	November 19, 2016	Mount Lemmon	Mount Lemmon Survey	·	1.5 km	MPC · JPL
870277	2016 WY_{82}	—	November 26, 2016	Haleakala	Pan-STARRS 1	·	770 m	MPC · JPL
870278	2016 WZ_{84}	—	January 3, 2017	Haleakala	Pan-STARRS 1	·	1.9 km	MPC · JPL
870279	2016 WH_{85}	—	October 8, 2008	Mount Lemmon	Mount Lemmon Survey	·	2.2 km	MPC · JPL
870280	2016 XV	—	November 5, 2007	Kitt Peak	Spacewatch	AEO	760 m	MPC · JPL
870281	2016 XN_{2}	—	September 4, 2012	Haleakala	Pan-STARRS 1	PHO	960 m	MPC · JPL
870282	2016 XU_{2}	—	December 2, 2016	Mount Lemmon	Mount Lemmon Survey	H	500 m	MPC · JPL
870283	2016 XX_{2}	—	June 27, 2015	Haleakala	Pan-STARRS 1	·	1.6 km	MPC · JPL
870284	2016 XB_{3}	—	December 4, 2007	Mount Lemmon	Mount Lemmon Survey	·	1.5 km	MPC · JPL
870285	2016 XJ_{3}	—	October 19, 2010	Mount Lemmon	Mount Lemmon Survey	·	2.5 km	MPC · JPL
870286	2016 XA_{5}	—	October 6, 2005	Kitt Peak	Spacewatch	·	760 m	MPC · JPL
870287	2016 XS_{5}	—	November 2, 2011	Kitt Peak	Spacewatch	·	1.9 km	MPC · JPL
870288	2016 XE_{6}	—	October 24, 2016	Mount Lemmon	Mount Lemmon Survey	·	1.1 km	MPC · JPL
870289	2016 XE_{9}	—	September 20, 2011	Kitt Peak	Spacewatch	·	1.4 km	MPC · JPL
870290	2016 XR_{9}	—	November 26, 2016	Haleakala	Pan-STARRS 1	AEO	810 m	MPC · JPL
870291	2016 XC_{12}	—	August 14, 2015	Haleakala	Pan-STARRS 1	·	1.4 km	MPC · JPL
870292	2016 XH_{14}	—	December 4, 2016	Mount Lemmon	Mount Lemmon Survey	·	1.5 km	MPC · JPL
870293	2016 XS_{14}	—	September 4, 2011	Haleakala	Pan-STARRS 1	·	1.4 km	MPC · JPL
870294	2016 XB_{16}	—	October 8, 2010	Catalina	CSS	·	2.2 km	MPC · JPL
870295	2016 XN_{16}	—	October 13, 2016	Mount Lemmon	Mount Lemmon Survey	·	1.3 km	MPC · JPL
870296	2016 XU_{17}	—	November 30, 2016	Mount Lemmon	Mount Lemmon Survey	T_{j} (2.98) · AMO +1km	870 m	MPC · JPL
870297	2016 XN_{18}	—	November 9, 2016	Mount Lemmon	Mount Lemmon Survey	EUP	2.9 km	MPC · JPL
870298	2016 XL_{19}	—	December 1, 2016	Mount Lemmon	Mount Lemmon Survey	(5)	770 m	MPC · JPL
870299	2016 XE_{20}	—	May 8, 2014	Haleakala	Pan-STARRS 1	·	1.6 km	MPC · JPL
870300	2016 XH_{20}	—	October 24, 2016	Mount Lemmon	Mount Lemmon Survey	·	1.6 km	MPC · JPL

== 870301–870400 ==
back to top

Designation			Discovery			Properties		Ref
Permanent	Provisional	Named after	Date	Site	Discoverer(s)	Category	Diam.	Ref
870301	2016 XK_{20}	—	November 18, 2016	Mount Lemmon	Mount Lemmon Survey	·	980 m	MPC · JPL
870302	2016 XA_{25}	—	December 4, 2016	Mount Lemmon	Mount Lemmon Survey	·	1.8 km	MPC · JPL
870303	2016 XA_{27}	—	December 9, 2016	Mount Lemmon	Mount Lemmon Survey	·	1.9 km	MPC · JPL
870304	2016 XE_{27}	—	December 1, 2016	Mount Lemmon	Mount Lemmon Survey	·	2.6 km	MPC · JPL
870305	2016 XF_{27}	—	December 11, 2016	Mount Lemmon	Mount Lemmon Survey	H	390 m	MPC · JPL
870306	2016 XJ_{27}	—	December 8, 2016	Mount Lemmon	Mount Lemmon Survey	·	1.2 km	MPC · JPL
870307	2016 XO_{27}	—	December 4, 2016	Mount Lemmon	Mount Lemmon Survey	·	1.4 km	MPC · JPL
870308	2016 XX_{28}	—	December 10, 2016	Mount Lemmon	Mount Lemmon Survey	·	1.4 km	MPC · JPL
870309	2016 XA_{32}	—	December 6, 2016	Mount Lemmon	Mount Lemmon Survey	EUN	920 m	MPC · JPL
870310	2016 XH_{33}	—	December 22, 2012	Haleakala	Pan-STARRS 1	·	1.2 km	MPC · JPL
870311	2016 XS_{33}	—	October 23, 2011	Haleakala	Pan-STARRS 1	·	1.6 km	MPC · JPL
870312	2016 XV_{33}	—	December 1, 2016	Mount Lemmon	Mount Lemmon Survey	·	1.1 km	MPC · JPL
870313	2016 XX_{33}	—	October 8, 2002	Anderson Mesa	LONEOS	·	1.5 km	MPC · JPL
870314	2016 XM_{35}	—	December 4, 2016	Mount Lemmon	Mount Lemmon Survey	H	340 m	MPC · JPL
870315	2016 XO_{37}	—	December 1, 2016	Mount Lemmon	Mount Lemmon Survey	·	1.1 km	MPC · JPL
870316	2016 XG_{38}	—	December 23, 2012	Haleakala	Pan-STARRS 1	·	1.1 km	MPC · JPL
870317	2016 XH_{38}	—	December 4, 2016	Mount Lemmon	Mount Lemmon Survey	·	1.1 km	MPC · JPL
870318	2016 XP_{41}	—	November 22, 2011	Mount Lemmon	Mount Lemmon Survey	·	1.3 km	MPC · JPL
870319	2016 YY_{2}	—	December 22, 2016	Haleakala	Pan-STARRS 1	·	1.6 km	MPC · JPL
870320	2016 YY_{3}	—	December 23, 2016	Haleakala	Pan-STARRS 1	·	980 m	MPC · JPL
870321	2016 YF_{4}	—	January 29, 2012	Mount Lemmon	Mount Lemmon Survey	H	410 m	MPC · JPL
870322	2016 YJ_{5}	—	November 15, 2003	Kitt Peak	Spacewatch	(116763)	1.5 km	MPC · JPL
870323	2016 YR_{6}	—	January 16, 2013	Mount Lemmon	Mount Lemmon Survey	·	1.2 km	MPC · JPL
870324	2016 YA_{8}	—	April 12, 2013	Haleakala	Pan-STARRS 1	·	1.5 km	MPC · JPL
870325	2016 YE_{8}	—	February 23, 2015	Haleakala	Pan-STARRS 1	H	410 m	MPC · JPL
870326	2016 YB_{9}	—	November 9, 2016	Mount Lemmon	Mount Lemmon Survey	·	1.2 km	MPC · JPL
870327	2016 YD_{9}	—	November 26, 2016	Mount Lemmon	Mount Lemmon Survey	·	1.5 km	MPC · JPL
870328	2016 YS_{11}	—	December 18, 2012	Bisei	BATTeRS	·	1.2 km	MPC · JPL
870329	2016 YA_{12}	—	November 24, 2016	Haleakala	Pan-STARRS 1	JUN	770 m	MPC · JPL
870330	2016 YX_{13}	—	March 3, 2009	Kitt Peak	Spacewatch	ADE	1.2 km	MPC · JPL
870331	2016 YB_{14}	—	February 26, 2012	Haleakala	Pan-STARRS 1	·	2.7 km	MPC · JPL
870332	2016 YP_{15}	—	December 23, 2016	Haleakala	Pan-STARRS 1	·	450 m	MPC · JPL
870333	2016 YO_{17}	—	September 18, 2003	Kitt Peak	Spacewatch	·	530 m	MPC · JPL
870334	2016 YM_{18}	—	December 22, 2016	Haleakala	Pan-STARRS 1	·	530 m	MPC · JPL
870335	2016 YK_{19}	—	December 28, 2016	Haleakala	Pan-STARRS 1	·	1.4 km	MPC · JPL
870336	2016 YL_{19}	—	December 23, 2016	Haleakala	Pan-STARRS 1	·	1.4 km	MPC · JPL
870337	2016 YZ_{19}	—	December 23, 2016	Haleakala	Pan-STARRS 1	EOS	1.4 km	MPC · JPL
870338	2016 YB_{20}	—	December 23, 2016	Haleakala	Pan-STARRS 1	·	1.9 km	MPC · JPL
870339	2016 YJ_{20}	—	December 27, 2016	Mount Lemmon	Mount Lemmon Survey	·	2.0 km	MPC · JPL
870340	2016 YS_{20}	—	December 24, 2016	Mount Lemmon	Mount Lemmon Survey	·	690 m	MPC · JPL
870341	2016 YZ_{20}	—	December 22, 2016	Haleakala	Pan-STARRS 1	H	360 m	MPC · JPL
870342	2016 YL_{21}	—	December 27, 2016	Mount Lemmon	Mount Lemmon Survey	BRA	1.2 km	MPC · JPL
870343	2016 YX_{21}	—	December 28, 2016	Mount Lemmon	Mount Lemmon Survey	·	990 m	MPC · JPL
870344	2016 YE_{22}	—	December 23, 2016	Haleakala	Pan-STARRS 1	EOS	1.3 km	MPC · JPL
870345	2016 YK_{22}	—	December 23, 2016	Haleakala	Pan-STARRS 1	·	1.6 km	MPC · JPL
870346	2016 YS_{23}	—	December 23, 2016	Haleakala	Pan-STARRS 1	·	1.1 km	MPC · JPL
870347	2016 YM_{24}	—	December 24, 2016	Mount Lemmon	Mount Lemmon Survey	·	1.2 km	MPC · JPL
870348	2016 YE_{25}	—	December 23, 2016	Haleakala	Pan-STARRS 1	EUN	750 m	MPC · JPL
870349	2016 YN_{25}	—	December 23, 2016	Haleakala	Pan-STARRS 1	·	1.2 km	MPC · JPL
870350	2016 YM_{29}	—	December 18, 2016	Mount Lemmon	Mount Lemmon Survey	H	360 m	MPC · JPL
870351	2016 YR_{29}	—	December 5, 2016	Mount Lemmon	Mount Lemmon Survey	·	1.7 km	MPC · JPL
870352	2016 YJ_{33}	—	December 23, 2016	Haleakala	Pan-STARRS 1	·	1.4 km	MPC · JPL
870353	2016 YX_{33}	—	December 24, 2016	Haleakala	Pan-STARRS 1	EUN	750 m	MPC · JPL
870354	2016 YG_{34}	—	December 22, 2016	Haleakala	Pan-STARRS 1	GAL	1.1 km	MPC · JPL
870355	2016 YP_{34}	—	December 27, 2016	Calar Alto	S. Hellmich, S. Mottola	EUN	970 m	MPC · JPL
870356	2016 YV_{35}	—	December 24, 2016	Haleakala	Pan-STARRS 1	·	1.0 km	MPC · JPL
870357	2016 YQ_{36}	—	December 23, 2016	Haleakala	Pan-STARRS 1	·	2.1 km	MPC · JPL
870358	2016 YU_{36}	—	December 24, 2016	Mount Lemmon	Mount Lemmon Survey	·	1.1 km	MPC · JPL
870359	2016 YP_{38}	—	December 24, 2016	Haleakala	Pan-STARRS 1	TIR	2.2 km	MPC · JPL
870360	2016 YQ_{38}	—	December 23, 2016	Haleakala	Pan-STARRS 1	·	1.4 km	MPC · JPL
870361	2016 YC_{39}	—	December 28, 2016	Calar Alto	S. Hellmich, S. Mottola	L5	6.1 km	MPC · JPL
870362	2016 YV_{39}	—	December 25, 2016	Mauna Kea	COIAS	EOS	1.1 km	MPC · JPL
870363	2016 YK_{43}	—	December 23, 2016	Haleakala	Pan-STARRS 1	·	850 m	MPC · JPL
870364	2017 AA	—	December 18, 2007	Mount Lemmon	Mount Lemmon Survey	(11097)	1.4 km	MPC · JPL
870365	2017 AF	—	January 2, 2017	Haleakala	Pan-STARRS 1	H	360 m	MPC · JPL
870366	2017 AP	—	October 18, 2003	Kitt Peak	Spacewatch	·	850 m	MPC · JPL
870367	2017 AY	—	October 3, 2005	Catalina	CSS	·	550 m	MPC · JPL
870368	2017 AA_{1}	—	November 18, 2004	Campo Imperatore	CINEOS	·	2.3 km	MPC · JPL
870369	2017 AL_{2}	—	November 1, 2011	Mount Lemmon	Mount Lemmon Survey	·	1.6 km	MPC · JPL
870370	2017 AF_{4}	—	February 15, 2010	Kitt Peak	Spacewatch	H	300 m	MPC · JPL
870371	2017 AC_{6}	—	October 7, 2012	Haleakala	Pan-STARRS 1	·	880 m	MPC · JPL
870372	2017 AB_{9}	—	January 30, 2012	Kitt Peak	Spacewatch	·	1.9 km	MPC · JPL
870373	2017 AD_{9}	—	September 12, 2015	Haleakala	Pan-STARRS 1	TIR	1.8 km	MPC · JPL
870374	2017 AH_{11}	—	August 21, 2015	Haleakala	Pan-STARRS 1	LIX	2.3 km	MPC · JPL
870375	2017 AY_{12}	—	June 2, 2014	Haleakala	Pan-STARRS 1	BRA	1.2 km	MPC · JPL
870376	2017 AN_{16}	—	November 28, 2011	Haleakala	Pan-STARRS 1	·	1.8 km	MPC · JPL
870377	2017 AJ_{17}	—	June 25, 2009	Siding Spring	SSS	·	1.9 km	MPC · JPL
870378	2017 AZ_{18}	—	August 21, 2015	Haleakala	Pan-STARRS 1	THB	2.4 km	MPC · JPL
870379	2017 AA_{19}	—	October 4, 2003	Kitt Peak	Spacewatch	·	950 m	MPC · JPL
870380	2017 AV_{22}	—	October 13, 2010	Mount Lemmon	Mount Lemmon Survey	·	1.1 km	MPC · JPL
870381	2017 AF_{23}	—	March 1, 2011	Mount Lemmon	Mount Lemmon Survey	·	1.9 km	MPC · JPL
870382	2017 AP_{25}	—	January 4, 2017	Haleakala	Pan-STARRS 1	·	1.8 km	MPC · JPL
870383	2017 AC_{26}	—	January 3, 2017	Haleakala	Pan-STARRS 1	·	820 m	MPC · JPL
870384	2017 AD_{26}	—	January 4, 2017	Haleakala	Pan-STARRS 1	·	830 m	MPC · JPL
870385	2017 AA_{28}	—	March 13, 2013	Palomar	Palomar Transient Factory	·	1.1 km	MPC · JPL
870386	2017 AW_{28}	—	January 2, 2017	Haleakala	Pan-STARRS 1	·	920 m	MPC · JPL
870387	2017 AE_{29}	—	January 4, 2017	Haleakala	Pan-STARRS 1	·	1.9 km	MPC · JPL
870388	2017 AG_{29}	—	January 2, 2017	Haleakala	Pan-STARRS 1	·	2.0 km	MPC · JPL
870389	2017 AM_{29}	—	January 3, 2017	Haleakala	Pan-STARRS 1	·	990 m	MPC · JPL
870390	2017 AD_{30}	—	January 2, 2017	Haleakala	Pan-STARRS 1	·	1.4 km	MPC · JPL
870391	2017 AT_{30}	—	January 2, 2017	Haleakala	Pan-STARRS 1	BAR	1.1 km	MPC · JPL
870392	2017 AU_{30}	—	January 2, 2017	Haleakala	Pan-STARRS 1	V	440 m	MPC · JPL
870393	2017 AA_{31}	—	January 7, 2017	Mount Lemmon	Mount Lemmon Survey	·	510 m	MPC · JPL
870394	2017 AU_{32}	—	January 4, 2017	Haleakala	Pan-STARRS 1	L5	5.9 km	MPC · JPL
870395	2017 AZ_{32}	—	January 3, 2017	Haleakala	Pan-STARRS 1	·	1.2 km	MPC · JPL
870396	2017 AB_{33}	—	January 2, 2017	Haleakala	Pan-STARRS 1	·	1.0 km	MPC · JPL
870397	2017 AX_{33}	—	April 10, 2010	Kitt Peak	Spacewatch	·	700 m	MPC · JPL
870398	2017 AO_{34}	—	January 3, 2017	Haleakala	Pan-STARRS 1	·	2.3 km	MPC · JPL
870399	2017 AS_{34}	—	January 2, 2017	Haleakala	Pan-STARRS 1	·	1.4 km	MPC · JPL
870400	2017 AM_{35}	—	March 20, 2012	Haleakala	Pan-STARRS 1	·	1.2 km	MPC · JPL

== 870401–870500 ==
back to top

Designation			Discovery			Properties		Ref
Permanent	Provisional	Named after	Date	Site	Discoverer(s)	Category	Diam.	Ref
870401	2017 AO_{35}	—	October 5, 2015	Haleakala	Pan-STARRS 1	·	1.4 km	MPC · JPL
870402	2017 AR_{35}	—	November 17, 2014	Haleakala	Pan-STARRS 1	L5	6.2 km	MPC · JPL
870403	2017 AU_{35}	—	January 5, 2017	Mount Lemmon	Mount Lemmon Survey	·	1.2 km	MPC · JPL
870404	2017 AD_{36}	—	January 4, 2017	Haleakala	Pan-STARRS 1	·	1.2 km	MPC · JPL
870405	2017 AG_{36}	—	January 9, 2017	Mount Lemmon	Mount Lemmon Survey	·	1.3 km	MPC · JPL
870406	2017 AJ_{37}	—	January 3, 2017	Haleakala	Pan-STARRS 1	EOS	1.4 km	MPC · JPL
870407	2017 AK_{37}	—	October 23, 2015	Mount Lemmon	Mount Lemmon Survey	EOS	1.3 km	MPC · JPL
870408	2017 AP_{37}	—	September 29, 2009	Mount Lemmon	Mount Lemmon Survey	·	2.2 km	MPC · JPL
870409	2017 AB_{38}	—	January 4, 2017	Haleakala	Pan-STARRS 1	EOS	1.4 km	MPC · JPL
870410	2017 AE_{38}	—	January 7, 2017	Mount Lemmon	Mount Lemmon Survey	EOS	1.4 km	MPC · JPL
870411	2017 AG_{38}	—	January 10, 2017	Haleakala	Pan-STARRS 1	URS	2.5 km	MPC · JPL
870412	2017 AQ_{38}	—	January 2, 2017	Haleakala	Pan-STARRS 1	·	1.3 km	MPC · JPL
870413	2017 AU_{38}	—	January 2, 2017	Haleakala	Pan-STARRS 1	·	520 m	MPC · JPL
870414	2017 AX_{38}	—	January 4, 2017	Haleakala	Pan-STARRS 1	·	790 m	MPC · JPL
870415	2017 AH_{39}	—	January 3, 2017	Haleakala	Pan-STARRS 1	EUN	810 m	MPC · JPL
870416	2017 AJ_{39}	—	January 9, 2017	Mount Lemmon	Mount Lemmon Survey	EUN	840 m	MPC · JPL
870417	2017 AK_{39}	—	January 5, 2017	Mount Lemmon	Mount Lemmon Survey	EUN	840 m	MPC · JPL
870418	2017 AX_{40}	—	January 2, 2017	Haleakala	Pan-STARRS 1	·	1.4 km	MPC · JPL
870419	2017 AJ_{42}	—	January 2, 2017	Haleakala	Pan-STARRS 1	·	1.9 km	MPC · JPL
870420	2017 AB_{43}	—	January 3, 2017	Haleakala	Pan-STARRS 1	·	1.6 km	MPC · JPL
870421	2017 AO_{43}	—	January 7, 2017	Mount Lemmon	Mount Lemmon Survey	·	1.3 km	MPC · JPL
870422	2017 AZ_{43}	—	January 9, 2017	Kitt Peak	Spacewatch	·	910 m	MPC · JPL
870423	2017 AJ_{44}	—	January 4, 2017	Haleakala	Pan-STARRS 1	·	490 m	MPC · JPL
870424	2017 AF_{45}	—	January 2, 2017	Haleakala	Pan-STARRS 1	EOS	1.6 km	MPC · JPL
870425	2017 AW_{45}	—	January 2, 2017	Haleakala	Pan-STARRS 1	EUN	870 m	MPC · JPL
870426	2017 AY_{45}	—	January 3, 2017	Haleakala	Pan-STARRS 1	·	2.3 km	MPC · JPL
870427	2017 AZ_{45}	—	November 3, 2015	Mount Lemmon	Mount Lemmon Survey	EUN	830 m	MPC · JPL
870428	2017 AS_{46}	—	October 17, 2010	Mount Lemmon	Mount Lemmon Survey	·	1.4 km	MPC · JPL
870429	2017 AE_{47}	—	January 4, 2017	Haleakala	Pan-STARRS 1	·	2.9 km	MPC · JPL
870430	2017 AJ_{48}	—	January 4, 2017	Oukaïmeden	M. Ory	·	1.2 km	MPC · JPL
870431	2017 AK_{49}	—	January 3, 2017	Haleakala	Pan-STARRS 1	·	2.3 km	MPC · JPL
870432	2017 AN_{49}	—	January 7, 2017	Mount Lemmon	Mount Lemmon Survey	·	2.4 km	MPC · JPL
870433	2017 AK_{50}	—	January 4, 2017	Haleakala	Pan-STARRS 1	·	1.6 km	MPC · JPL
870434	2017 AZ_{51}	—	January 4, 2017	Haleakala	Pan-STARRS 1	L5	5.8 km	MPC · JPL
870435	2017 AT_{52}	—	January 2, 2017	Haleakala	Pan-STARRS 1	·	1.4 km	MPC · JPL
870436	2017 AU_{55}	—	January 3, 2017	Haleakala	Pan-STARRS 1	MAR	700 m	MPC · JPL
870437 Leilani	2017 AS_{63}	Leilani	January 2, 2017	Mauna Kea	COIAS	·	1.4 km	MPC · JPL
870438	2017 AU_{66}	—	January 2, 2017	Haleakala	Pan-STARRS 1	L5	7.5 km	MPC · JPL
870439	2017 AY_{66}	—	January 2, 2017	Haleakala	Pan-STARRS 1	L5	6.8 km	MPC · JPL
870440	2017 AL_{69}	—	January 3, 2017	Haleakala	Pan-STARRS 1	·	1.3 km	MPC · JPL
870441	2017 BT_{1}	—	January 9, 2017	Mount Lemmon	Mount Lemmon Survey	BRA	1.3 km	MPC · JPL
870442	2017 BA_{2}	—	August 31, 2005	Kitt Peak	Spacewatch	·	1.4 km	MPC · JPL
870443	2017 BT_{3}	—	December 21, 2003	Kitt Peak	Spacewatch	·	940 m	MPC · JPL
870444	2017 BS_{4}	—	September 12, 2007	Bergisch Gladbach	W. Bickel	·	1.2 km	MPC · JPL
870445	2017 BU_{4}	—	August 14, 2015	Haleakala	Pan-STARRS 1	·	2.0 km	MPC · JPL
870446	2017 BH_{6}	—	March 22, 2012	Mount Lemmon	Mount Lemmon Survey	H	330 m	MPC · JPL
870447	2017 BJ_{10}	—	November 10, 2016	Haleakala	Pan-STARRS 1	(895)	2.6 km	MPC · JPL
870448	2017 BU_{10}	—	November 10, 2016	Haleakala	Pan-STARRS 1	·	1.0 km	MPC · JPL
870449	2017 BX_{10}	—	July 1, 2014	Haleakala	Pan-STARRS 1	·	3.4 km	MPC · JPL
870450	2017 BO_{11}	—	July 23, 2015	Haleakala	Pan-STARRS 1	T_{j} (2.97)	2.5 km	MPC · JPL
870451	2017 BC_{15}	—	November 8, 2016	Haleakala	Pan-STARRS 1	·	1.6 km	MPC · JPL
870452	2017 BS_{15}	—	October 3, 2006	Mount Lemmon	Mount Lemmon Survey	·	1.5 km	MPC · JPL
870453	2017 BA_{16}	—	June 30, 2014	Haleakala	Pan-STARRS 1	·	2.4 km	MPC · JPL
870454	2017 BP_{16}	—	March 1, 2009	Mount Lemmon	Mount Lemmon Survey	H	370 m	MPC · JPL
870455	2017 BU_{18}	—	November 10, 2016	Haleakala	Pan-STARRS 1	·	1.2 km	MPC · JPL
870456	2017 BJ_{22}	—	February 13, 2008	Kitt Peak	Spacewatch	·	1.1 km	MPC · JPL
870457	2017 BV_{23}	—	February 8, 2008	Mount Lemmon	Mount Lemmon Survey	·	1.4 km	MPC · JPL
870458	2017 BJ_{24}	—	January 26, 2017	Mount Lemmon	Mount Lemmon Survey	LIX	2.9 km	MPC · JPL
870459	2017 BA_{25}	—	January 26, 2017	Haleakala	Pan-STARRS 1	·	1.1 km	MPC · JPL
870460	2017 BL_{25}	—	January 26, 2017	Haleakala	Pan-STARRS 1	·	1.4 km	MPC · JPL
870461	2017 BX_{30}	—	January 27, 2017	Haleakala	Pan-STARRS 1	·	1.4 km	MPC · JPL
870462	2017 BU_{31}	—	January 28, 2017	Mount Lemmon	Mount Lemmon Survey	AMO	240 m	MPC · JPL
870463	2017 BU_{35}	—	January 28, 2017	Haleakala	Pan-STARRS 1	MAS	600 m	MPC · JPL
870464	2017 BC_{36}	—	December 22, 2016	Haleakala	Pan-STARRS 1	·	1.3 km	MPC · JPL
870465	2017 BZ_{39}	—	December 30, 2007	Mount Lemmon	Mount Lemmon Survey	·	1.1 km	MPC · JPL
870466	2017 BE_{41}	—	June 26, 2015	Haleakala	Pan-STARRS 1	·	1.1 km	MPC · JPL
870467	2017 BO_{41}	—	January 7, 2017	Mount Lemmon	Mount Lemmon Survey	·	460 m	MPC · JPL
870468	2017 BD_{42}	—	January 7, 2017	Mount Lemmon	Mount Lemmon Survey	·	940 m	MPC · JPL
870469	2017 BH_{43}	—	January 27, 2007	Mount Lemmon	Mount Lemmon Survey	·	530 m	MPC · JPL
870470	2017 BZ_{43}	—	January 26, 2017	Mount Lemmon	Mount Lemmon Survey	NYS	670 m	MPC · JPL
870471	2017 BU_{45}	—	September 9, 2015	Haleakala	Pan-STARRS 1	·	760 m	MPC · JPL
870472	2017 BE_{46}	—	September 17, 2010	Mount Lemmon	Mount Lemmon Survey	·	1.5 km	MPC · JPL
870473	2017 BU_{48}	—	February 27, 2012	Haleakala	Pan-STARRS 1	·	1.9 km	MPC · JPL
870474	2017 BD_{49}	—	March 19, 2013	Haleakala	Pan-STARRS 1	MIS	1.6 km	MPC · JPL
870475	2017 BJ_{49}	—	December 3, 2012	Nogales	M. Schwartz, P. R. Holvorcem	·	880 m	MPC · JPL
870476	2017 BX_{50}	—	February 25, 2012	Mount Lemmon	Mount Lemmon Survey	·	1.6 km	MPC · JPL
870477	2017 BF_{51}	—	September 18, 2006	Kitt Peak	Spacewatch	·	600 m	MPC · JPL
870478	2017 BH_{51}	—	September 9, 2015	Haleakala	Pan-STARRS 1	·	610 m	MPC · JPL
870479	2017 BN_{53}	—	February 23, 2012	Mount Lemmon	Mount Lemmon Survey	EOS	1.3 km	MPC · JPL
870480	2017 BZ_{53}	—	April 2, 2009	Kitt Peak	Spacewatch	·	970 m	MPC · JPL
870481	2017 BL_{54}	—	December 23, 2016	Haleakala	Pan-STARRS 1	·	1.2 km	MPC · JPL
870482	2017 BH_{56}	—	December 23, 2016	Haleakala	Pan-STARRS 1	H	380 m	MPC · JPL
870483	2017 BY_{61}	—	July 27, 2014	Haleakala	Pan-STARRS 1	·	1.6 km	MPC · JPL
870484	2017 BO_{62}	—	October 21, 2012	Haleakala	Pan-STARRS 1	·	750 m	MPC · JPL
870485	2017 BT_{63}	—	November 8, 2016	Haleakala	Pan-STARRS 1	HNS	940 m	MPC · JPL
870486	2017 BM_{64}	—	October 12, 2006	Palomar	NEAT	DOR	2.0 km	MPC · JPL
870487	2017 BG_{66}	—	November 8, 2016	Haleakala	Pan-STARRS 1	·	1.3 km	MPC · JPL
870488	2017 BV_{71}	—	January 27, 2017	Haleakala	Pan-STARRS 1	·	930 m	MPC · JPL
870489	2017 BH_{76}	—	January 1, 2012	Mount Lemmon	Mount Lemmon Survey	·	1.4 km	MPC · JPL
870490	2017 BK_{76}	—	July 27, 2014	Haleakala	Pan-STARRS 1	·	1.6 km	MPC · JPL
870491	2017 BN_{78}	—	February 25, 2012	Mount Lemmon	Mount Lemmon Survey	·	1.6 km	MPC · JPL
870492	2017 BP_{78}	—	January 27, 2017	Haleakala	Pan-STARRS 1	·	1.7 km	MPC · JPL
870493	2017 BL_{82}	—	February 14, 2010	Mount Lemmon	Mount Lemmon Survey	·	670 m	MPC · JPL
870494	2017 BJ_{87}	—	January 2, 2017	Haleakala	Pan-STARRS 1	·	540 m	MPC · JPL
870495	2017 BT_{87}	—	January 28, 2017	Haleakala	Pan-STARRS 1	EUN	860 m	MPC · JPL
870496	2017 BH_{90}	—	August 26, 2012	Kitt Peak	Spacewatch	·	500 m	MPC · JPL
870497	2017 BG_{94}	—	October 1, 2005	Mount Lemmon	Mount Lemmon Survey	·	560 m	MPC · JPL
870498	2017 BJ_{99}	—	January 13, 2008	Kitt Peak	Spacewatch	·	1.4 km	MPC · JPL
870499	2017 BL_{99}	—	December 2, 2010	Mount Lemmon	Mount Lemmon Survey	THM	1.7 km	MPC · JPL
870500	2017 BP_{101}	—	August 20, 2014	Haleakala	Pan-STARRS 1	·	1.4 km	MPC · JPL

== 870501–870600 ==
back to top

Designation			Discovery			Properties		Ref
Permanent	Provisional	Named after	Date	Site	Discoverer(s)	Category	Diam.	Ref
870501	2017 BD_{102}	—	November 7, 2008	Mount Lemmon	Mount Lemmon Survey	·	720 m	MPC · JPL
870502	2017 BE_{102}	—	March 4, 2012	Mount Lemmon	Mount Lemmon Survey	·	1.3 km	MPC · JPL
870503	2017 BW_{103}	—	December 13, 2010	Mount Lemmon	Mount Lemmon Survey	·	2.4 km	MPC · JPL
870504	2017 BW_{108}	—	November 28, 2010	Mount Lemmon	Mount Lemmon Survey	·	1.8 km	MPC · JPL
870505	2017 BF_{110}	—	December 3, 2010	Mount Lemmon	Mount Lemmon Survey	·	1.6 km	MPC · JPL
870506	2017 BZ_{110}	—	November 14, 2010	Mount Lemmon	Mount Lemmon Survey	EOS	1.5 km	MPC · JPL
870507	2017 BY_{112}	—	December 25, 2010	Mount Lemmon	Mount Lemmon Survey	THB	2.1 km	MPC · JPL
870508	2017 BG_{114}	—	November 8, 2016	Haleakala	Pan-STARRS 1	·	2.1 km	MPC · JPL
870509	2017 BK_{114}	—	November 27, 2016	Haleakala	Pan-STARRS 1	T_{j} (2.99)	2.0 km	MPC · JPL
870510	2017 BS_{115}	—	December 7, 2016	Mount Lemmon	Mount Lemmon Survey	T_{j} (2.96)	2.8 km	MPC · JPL
870511	2017 BA_{118}	—	January 30, 2017	Haleakala	Pan-STARRS 1	BRA	1.2 km	MPC · JPL
870512	2017 BL_{118}	—	March 19, 2009	Kitt Peak	Spacewatch	H	350 m	MPC · JPL
870513	2017 BM_{119}	—	January 27, 2017	Mount Lemmon	Mount Lemmon Survey	·	470 m	MPC · JPL
870514	2017 BF_{121}	—	January 3, 2017	Haleakala	Pan-STARRS 1	·	2.4 km	MPC · JPL
870515	2017 BW_{121}	—	April 5, 2013	Palomar	Palomar Transient Factory	·	960 m	MPC · JPL
870516	2017 BL_{130}	—	July 25, 2014	Haleakala	Pan-STARRS 1	·	1.7 km	MPC · JPL
870517	2017 BO_{130}	—	November 8, 2010	Mount Lemmon	Mount Lemmon Survey	·	1.2 km	MPC · JPL
870518	2017 BJ_{133}	—	February 14, 2013	Haleakala	Pan-STARRS 1	·	1.9 km	MPC · JPL
870519	2017 BB_{141}	—	October 1, 2015	Mount Lemmon	Mount Lemmon Survey	T_{j} (2.99)	2.2 km	MPC · JPL
870520	2017 BH_{142}	—	January 26, 2017	Mount Lemmon	Mount Lemmon Survey	H	390 m	MPC · JPL
870521	2017 BS_{142}	—	January 30, 2017	Haleakala	Pan-STARRS 1	PHO	640 m	MPC · JPL
870522	2017 BZ_{142}	—	January 20, 2013	Mount Lemmon	Mount Lemmon Survey	·	1.0 km	MPC · JPL
870523	2017 BA_{143}	—	January 28, 2017	Haleakala	Pan-STARRS 1	·	3.4 km	MPC · JPL
870524	2017 BJ_{143}	—	January 28, 2017	Haleakala	Pan-STARRS 1	·	2.6 km	MPC · JPL
870525	2017 BM_{143}	—	January 28, 2017	Haleakala	Pan-STARRS 1	·	2.4 km	MPC · JPL
870526	2017 BO_{143}	—	January 26, 2017	Haleakala	Pan-STARRS 1	·	1.4 km	MPC · JPL
870527	2017 BE_{144}	—	March 22, 2012	Mount Lemmon	Mount Lemmon Survey	·	2.1 km	MPC · JPL
870528	2017 BR_{145}	—	January 28, 2017	Haleakala	Pan-STARRS 1	·	1.9 km	MPC · JPL
870529	2017 BS_{146}	—	January 19, 2017	Mount Lemmon	Mount Lemmon Survey	EUP	2.7 km	MPC · JPL
870530	2017 BP_{148}	—	January 26, 2017	Haleakala	Pan-STARRS 1	·	2.0 km	MPC · JPL
870531	2017 BW_{148}	—	January 29, 2017	Haleakala	Pan-STARRS 1	EOS	1.2 km	MPC · JPL
870532	2017 BE_{150}	—	January 31, 2017	Mount Lemmon	Mount Lemmon Survey	L5	7.4 km	MPC · JPL
870533	2017 BZ_{150}	—	March 26, 2009	Mount Lemmon	Mount Lemmon Survey	H	400 m	MPC · JPL
870534	2017 BC_{151}	—	January 29, 2017	Haleakala	Pan-STARRS 1	EUP	2.8 km	MPC · JPL
870535	2017 BL_{151}	—	January 28, 2017	Haleakala	Pan-STARRS 1	·	450 m	MPC · JPL
870536	2017 BT_{151}	—	January 28, 2017	Haleakala	Pan-STARRS 1	·	1.1 km	MPC · JPL
870537	2017 BG_{152}	—	January 27, 2017	Haleakala	Pan-STARRS 1	·	2.1 km	MPC · JPL
870538	2017 BV_{152}	—	January 30, 2017	Haleakala	Pan-STARRS 1	L5	7.7 km	MPC · JPL
870539	2017 BA_{153}	—	January 28, 2017	Haleakala	Pan-STARRS 1	·	2.3 km	MPC · JPL
870540	2017 BC_{153}	—	January 27, 2017	Haleakala	Pan-STARRS 1	·	820 m	MPC · JPL
870541	2017 BR_{155}	—	January 26, 2017	Haleakala	Pan-STARRS 1	PHO	700 m	MPC · JPL
870542	2017 BY_{155}	—	January 31, 2017	Haleakala	Pan-STARRS 1	·	860 m	MPC · JPL
870543	2017 BP_{156}	—	January 27, 2017	Haleakala	Pan-STARRS 1	(31811)	2.1 km	MPC · JPL
870544	2017 BY_{157}	—	January 28, 2017	Haleakala	Pan-STARRS 1	·	1.5 km	MPC · JPL
870545	2017 BE_{158}	—	October 17, 2012	Haleakala	Pan-STARRS 1	·	420 m	MPC · JPL
870546	2017 BO_{159}	—	January 27, 2017	Haleakala	Pan-STARRS 1	·	1.1 km	MPC · JPL
870547	2017 BQ_{159}	—	January 31, 2017	Haleakala	Pan-STARRS 1	H	370 m	MPC · JPL
870548	2017 BL_{161}	—	January 28, 2017	Mount Lemmon	Mount Lemmon Survey	H	340 m	MPC · JPL
870549	2017 BB_{162}	—	January 30, 2017	Haleakala	Pan-STARRS 1	·	2.2 km	MPC · JPL
870550	2017 BX_{162}	—	January 16, 2017	Haleakala	Pan-STARRS 1	·	2.5 km	MPC · JPL
870551	2017 BK_{163}	—	January 27, 2017	Haleakala	Pan-STARRS 1	·	1.5 km	MPC · JPL
870552	2017 BL_{163}	—	January 26, 2017	Haleakala	Pan-STARRS 1	EOS	1.6 km	MPC · JPL
870553	2017 BO_{163}	—	January 29, 2017	Haleakala	Pan-STARRS 1	·	1.1 km	MPC · JPL
870554	2017 BQ_{163}	—	January 27, 2017	Haleakala	Pan-STARRS 1	·	1.6 km	MPC · JPL
870555	2017 BV_{163}	—	January 28, 2017	Haleakala	Pan-STARRS 1	·	1.1 km	MPC · JPL
870556	2017 BK_{164}	—	January 28, 2017	Haleakala	Pan-STARRS 1	·	2.0 km	MPC · JPL
870557	2017 BS_{164}	—	January 29, 2017	Haleakala	Pan-STARRS 1	·	2.4 km	MPC · JPL
870558	2017 BF_{165}	—	January 28, 2017	Mount Lemmon	Mount Lemmon Survey	·	1.2 km	MPC · JPL
870559	2017 BN_{165}	—	January 27, 2017	Mount Lemmon	Mount Lemmon Survey	·	1.1 km	MPC · JPL
870560	2017 BR_{165}	—	January 30, 2017	Haleakala	Pan-STARRS 1	·	880 m	MPC · JPL
870561	2017 BK_{166}	—	January 26, 2017	Haleakala	Pan-STARRS 1	·	1.5 km	MPC · JPL
870562	2017 BR_{166}	—	January 26, 2017	Haleakala	Pan-STARRS 1	·	1.4 km	MPC · JPL
870563	2017 BT_{166}	—	January 28, 2017	Haleakala	Pan-STARRS 1	·	1.5 km	MPC · JPL
870564	2017 BV_{166}	—	January 29, 2017	Haleakala	Pan-STARRS 1	·	2.1 km	MPC · JPL
870565	2017 BY_{166}	—	January 30, 2017	Haleakala	Pan-STARRS 1	·	2.3 km	MPC · JPL
870566	2017 BE_{167}	—	January 27, 2017	Haleakala	Pan-STARRS 1	EOS	1.5 km	MPC · JPL
870567	2017 BH_{167}	—	January 26, 2017	Mount Lemmon	Mount Lemmon Survey	·	2.0 km	MPC · JPL
870568	2017 BY_{167}	—	January 26, 2017	Mount Lemmon	Mount Lemmon Survey	·	1.5 km	MPC · JPL
870569	2017 BE_{168}	—	January 28, 2017	Mount Lemmon	Mount Lemmon Survey	BRA	1.0 km	MPC · JPL
870570	2017 BP_{170}	—	January 27, 2017	Mount Lemmon	Mount Lemmon Survey	·	1.3 km	MPC · JPL
870571	2017 BF_{174}	—	January 26, 2017	Haleakala	Pan-STARRS 1	·	2.4 km	MPC · JPL
870572	2017 BQ_{177}	—	January 27, 2017	Mount Lemmon	Mount Lemmon Survey	·	940 m	MPC · JPL
870573	2017 BT_{177}	—	January 28, 2017	Haleakala	Pan-STARRS 1	·	1.4 km	MPC · JPL
870574	2017 BG_{178}	—	January 26, 2017	Mount Lemmon	Mount Lemmon Survey	·	990 m	MPC · JPL
870575	2017 BQ_{178}	—	January 29, 2017	Haleakala	Pan-STARRS 1	V	410 m	MPC · JPL
870576	2017 BG_{180}	—	January 26, 2017	Mount Lemmon	Mount Lemmon Survey	·	780 m	MPC · JPL
870577	2017 BO_{180}	—	January 31, 2017	Mount Lemmon	Mount Lemmon Survey	·	1.2 km	MPC · JPL
870578	2017 BD_{181}	—	January 20, 2017	Haleakala	Pan-STARRS 1	L5	6.0 km	MPC · JPL
870579	2017 BM_{181}	—	January 26, 2017	Mount Lemmon	Mount Lemmon Survey	·	1.5 km	MPC · JPL
870580	2017 BA_{182}	—	January 28, 2017	Haleakala	Pan-STARRS 1	EOS	1.3 km	MPC · JPL
870581	2017 BT_{182}	—	January 26, 2017	Haleakala	Pan-STARRS 1	V	440 m	MPC · JPL
870582	2017 BQ_{183}	—	January 26, 2017	Haleakala	Pan-STARRS 1	·	640 m	MPC · JPL
870583	2017 BV_{183}	—	January 31, 2017	Mount Lemmon	Mount Lemmon Survey	·	690 m	MPC · JPL
870584	2017 BY_{183}	—	January 28, 2017	Haleakala	Pan-STARRS 1	·	600 m	MPC · JPL
870585	2017 BX_{185}	—	January 28, 2017	Mount Lemmon	Mount Lemmon Survey	H	340 m	MPC · JPL
870586	2017 BA_{188}	—	January 29, 2017	Haleakala	Pan-STARRS 1	·	2.1 km	MPC · JPL
870587	2017 BK_{188}	—	January 26, 2017	Haleakala	Pan-STARRS 1	·	550 m	MPC · JPL
870588	2017 BQ_{188}	—	January 26, 2017	Haleakala	Pan-STARRS 1	·	530 m	MPC · JPL
870589	2017 BY_{189}	—	January 29, 2017	Haleakala	Pan-STARRS 1	·	2.2 km	MPC · JPL
870590	2017 BZ_{189}	—	January 30, 2017	Haleakala	Pan-STARRS 1	·	2.3 km	MPC · JPL
870591	2017 BF_{191}	—	January 28, 2017	Haleakala	Pan-STARRS 1	·	1.8 km	MPC · JPL
870592	2017 BA_{192}	—	January 28, 2017	Haleakala	Pan-STARRS 1	·	900 m	MPC · JPL
870593	2017 BJ_{192}	—	January 26, 2017	Haleakala	Pan-STARRS 1	·	460 m	MPC · JPL
870594	2017 BQ_{192}	—	September 23, 2015	Haleakala	Pan-STARRS 1	·	2.3 km	MPC · JPL
870595	2017 BE_{193}	—	January 29, 2017	Haleakala	Pan-STARRS 1	·	1.1 km	MPC · JPL
870596	2017 BJ_{195}	—	August 31, 2014	Kitt Peak	Spacewatch	EUP	2.5 km	MPC · JPL
870597	2017 BL_{196}	—	January 28, 2017	Haleakala	Pan-STARRS 1	ELF	2.3 km	MPC · JPL
870598	2017 BW_{196}	—	August 8, 2013	Haleakala	Pan-STARRS 1	·	1.4 km	MPC · JPL
870599	2017 BS_{197}	—	January 29, 2017	Haleakala	Pan-STARRS 1	VER	2.2 km	MPC · JPL
870600	2017 BZ_{197}	—	January 29, 2017	Haleakala	Pan-STARRS 1	·	460 m	MPC · JPL

== 870601–870700 ==
back to top

Designation			Discovery			Properties		Ref
Permanent	Provisional	Named after	Date	Site	Discoverer(s)	Category	Diam.	Ref
870601	2017 BJ_{199}	—	January 26, 2017	Haleakala	Pan-STARRS 1	EOS	1.3 km	MPC · JPL
870602	2017 BC_{200}	—	January 30, 2017	Haleakala	Pan-STARRS 1	·	1.7 km	MPC · JPL
870603	2017 BX_{200}	—	December 18, 2015	Mount Lemmon	Mount Lemmon Survey	·	1.8 km	MPC · JPL
870604	2017 BC_{201}	—	January 27, 2017	Haleakala	Pan-STARRS 1	·	1.2 km	MPC · JPL
870605	2017 BO_{201}	—	January 26, 2017	Haleakala	Pan-STARRS 1	·	560 m	MPC · JPL
870606	2017 BK_{207}	—	April 1, 2012	Mount Lemmon	Mount Lemmon Survey	·	2.0 km	MPC · JPL
870607	2017 BL_{209}	—	January 29, 2017	Haleakala	Pan-STARRS 1	·	890 m	MPC · JPL
870608	2017 BB_{211}	—	January 28, 2017	Haleakala	Pan-STARRS 1	·	490 m	MPC · JPL
870609	2017 BO_{211}	—	January 21, 2017	Piszkés-tető	K. Sárneczky, S. Kürti	·	480 m	MPC · JPL
870610	2017 BN_{212}	—	January 27, 2007	Mount Lemmon	Mount Lemmon Survey	·	670 m	MPC · JPL
870611	2017 BB_{214}	—	January 27, 2017	Haleakala	Pan-STARRS 1	·	2.2 km	MPC · JPL
870612	2017 BN_{216}	—	February 27, 2012	Haleakala	Pan-STARRS 1	·	1.8 km	MPC · JPL
870613	2017 BT_{220}	—	January 31, 2017	Mount Lemmon	Mount Lemmon Survey	L5	7.5 km	MPC · JPL
870614	2017 BX_{235}	—	January 23, 2017	Mauna Kea	COIAS	·	1.4 km	MPC · JPL
870615	2017 BM_{241}	—	October 26, 2009	Mount Lemmon	Mount Lemmon Survey	·	1.7 km	MPC · JPL
870616	2017 BL_{260}	—	January 21, 2017	Mauna Kea	COIAS	PHO	480 m	MPC · JPL
870617	2017 BQ_{260}	—	January 26, 2017	Mauna Kea	COIAS	L5	5.1 km	MPC · JPL
870618	2017 BN_{263}	—	January 27, 2017	Haleakala	Pan-STARRS 1	·	1.3 km	MPC · JPL
870619	2017 BQ_{264}	—	January 28, 2017	Haleakala	Pan-STARRS 1	·	2.1 km	MPC · JPL
870620	2017 CA_{1}	—	November 12, 2013	Mount Lemmon	Mount Lemmon Survey	H	630 m	MPC · JPL
870621	2017 CA_{3}	—	December 27, 2016	Mount Lemmon	Mount Lemmon Survey	·	2.2 km	MPC · JPL
870622	2017 CB_{4}	—	January 27, 2017	Haleakala	Pan-STARRS 1	·	1.6 km	MPC · JPL
870623	2017 CP_{4}	—	January 3, 2017	Haleakala	Pan-STARRS 1	H	300 m	MPC · JPL
870624	2017 CA_{5}	—	March 16, 2012	Mount Lemmon	Mount Lemmon Survey	TIR	2.0 km	MPC · JPL
870625	2017 CK_{5}	—	January 26, 2017	Mount Lemmon	Mount Lemmon Survey	H	440 m	MPC · JPL
870626	2017 CD_{6}	—	October 23, 2015	Mount Lemmon	Mount Lemmon Survey	WIT	690 m	MPC · JPL
870627	2017 CM_{7}	—	September 23, 2015	Haleakala	Pan-STARRS 1	·	1.8 km	MPC · JPL
870628	2017 CW_{8}	—	February 14, 2010	Mount Lemmon	Mount Lemmon Survey	·	610 m	MPC · JPL
870629	2017 CR_{9}	—	October 13, 2015	Haleakala	Pan-STARRS 1	·	1.6 km	MPC · JPL
870630	2017 CV_{9}	—	February 14, 2010	Mount Lemmon	Mount Lemmon Survey	·	560 m	MPC · JPL
870631	2017 CN_{11}	—	June 18, 2013	Haleakala	Pan-STARRS 1	·	2.7 km	MPC · JPL
870632	2017 CA_{13}	—	November 10, 2015	Mount Lemmon	Mount Lemmon Survey	·	2.7 km	MPC · JPL
870633	2017 CG_{17}	—	July 7, 2005	Mauna Kea	Veillet, C.	·	470 m	MPC · JPL
870634	2017 CK_{17}	—	April 9, 2013	Haleakala	Pan-STARRS 1	AEO	800 m	MPC · JPL
870635	2017 CL_{19}	—	March 16, 2010	Kitt Peak	Spacewatch	·	910 m	MPC · JPL
870636	2017 CN_{20}	—	January 28, 2017	Haleakala	Pan-STARRS 1	·	1.5 km	MPC · JPL
870637	2017 CP_{20}	—	January 18, 2012	Mount Lemmon	Mount Lemmon Survey	·	1.4 km	MPC · JPL
870638	2017 CB_{21}	—	January 28, 2017	Haleakala	Pan-STARRS 1	·	1.6 km	MPC · JPL
870639	2017 CJ_{21}	—	February 3, 2017	Mount Lemmon	Mount Lemmon Survey	·	2.4 km	MPC · JPL
870640	2017 CV_{23}	—	March 5, 2013	Haleakala	Pan-STARRS 1	·	1.4 km	MPC · JPL
870641	2017 CJ_{26}	—	February 4, 2005	Kitt Peak	Spacewatch	L5	6.1 km	MPC · JPL
870642	2017 CO_{28}	—	February 3, 2017	Mount Lemmon	Mount Lemmon Survey	·	1.4 km	MPC · JPL
870643	2017 CA_{30}	—	August 3, 2014	Haleakala	Pan-STARRS 1	·	2.0 km	MPC · JPL
870644	2017 CV_{30}	—	September 21, 2011	Mount Lemmon	Mount Lemmon Survey	·	1.0 km	MPC · JPL
870645	2017 CA_{31}	—	December 31, 2008	Mount Lemmon	Mount Lemmon Survey	H	330 m	MPC · JPL
870646	2017 CM_{35}	—	January 14, 2011	Kitt Peak	Spacewatch	·	2.4 km	MPC · JPL
870647	2017 CQ_{36}	—	February 3, 2017	Haleakala	Pan-STARRS 1	·	1.1 km	MPC · JPL
870648	2017 CH_{38}	—	January 19, 2004	Kitt Peak	Spacewatch	·	840 m	MPC · JPL
870649	2017 CZ_{38}	—	February 4, 2017	Haleakala	Pan-STARRS 1	·	2.3 km	MPC · JPL
870650	2017 CA_{39}	—	February 4, 2017	Haleakala	Pan-STARRS 1	EOS	1.5 km	MPC · JPL
870651	2017 CV_{39}	—	February 4, 2017	Haleakala	Pan-STARRS 1	·	1.9 km	MPC · JPL
870652	2017 CW_{40}	—	January 12, 2011	Mount Lemmon	Mount Lemmon Survey	EOS	1.3 km	MPC · JPL
870653	2017 CY_{43}	—	May 25, 2014	Haleakala	Pan-STARRS 1	·	940 m	MPC · JPL
870654	2017 CY_{44}	—	February 4, 2017	Haleakala	Pan-STARRS 1	·	1.9 km	MPC · JPL
870655	2017 CL_{45}	—	February 3, 2017	Mount Lemmon	Mount Lemmon Survey	·	470 m	MPC · JPL
870656	2017 CO_{45}	—	February 4, 2017	Haleakala	Pan-STARRS 1	·	1.4 km	MPC · JPL
870657	2017 CC_{46}	—	September 10, 2007	Pic du Midi de Bigorre	Sogorb, P.	·	1.0 km	MPC · JPL
870658	2017 CR_{46}	—	February 4, 2017	Haleakala	Pan-STARRS 1	·	2.4 km	MPC · JPL
870659	2017 CO_{48}	—	February 3, 2017	Haleakala	Pan-STARRS 1	·	1.7 km	MPC · JPL
870660	2017 CQ_{50}	—	February 1, 2017	Mount Lemmon	Mount Lemmon Survey	·	1.9 km	MPC · JPL
870661	2017 CS_{58}	—	November 20, 2015	Mount Lemmon	Mount Lemmon Survey	·	2.1 km	MPC · JPL
870662	2017 CG_{65}	—	February 3, 2017	Haleakala	Pan-STARRS 1	·	1.4 km	MPC · JPL
870663	2017 CG_{67}	—	July 14, 2013	Haleakala	Pan-STARRS 1	·	2.4 km	MPC · JPL
870664	2017 CK_{67}	—	February 3, 2017	Mount Lemmon	Mount Lemmon Survey	·	1.4 km	MPC · JPL
870665	2017 CN_{67}	—	February 2, 2017	Haleakala	Pan-STARRS 1	·	2.1 km	MPC · JPL
870666	2017 DX_{7}	—	October 8, 2015	Haleakala	Pan-STARRS 1	·	2.3 km	MPC · JPL
870667	2017 DG_{11}	—	January 14, 2011	Mount Lemmon	Mount Lemmon Survey	·	2.2 km	MPC · JPL
870668	2017 DS_{11}	—	October 11, 2012	Haleakala	Pan-STARRS 1	·	490 m	MPC · JPL
870669	2017 DK_{12}	—	January 26, 2017	Mount Lemmon	Mount Lemmon Survey	·	3.1 km	MPC · JPL
870670	2017 DS_{13}	—	January 6, 2013	Kitt Peak	Spacewatch	MAS	600 m	MPC · JPL
870671	2017 DJ_{14}	—	April 25, 2007	Mount Lemmon	Mount Lemmon Survey	·	1.8 km	MPC · JPL
870672	2017 DX_{14}	—	April 28, 2012	Mount Lemmon	Mount Lemmon Survey	·	2.1 km	MPC · JPL
870673	2017 DX_{16}	—	September 27, 2009	Mount Lemmon	Mount Lemmon Survey	·	510 m	MPC · JPL
870674	2017 DG_{19}	—	January 6, 2010	Kitt Peak	Spacewatch	·	470 m	MPC · JPL
870675	2017 DE_{20}	—	March 19, 2013	Haleakala	Pan-STARRS 1	·	1.0 km	MPC · JPL
870676	2017 DR_{21}	—	May 25, 2014	Haleakala	Pan-STARRS 1	·	620 m	MPC · JPL
870677	2017 DN_{23}	—	March 15, 2012	Mount Lemmon	Mount Lemmon Survey	EOS	1.4 km	MPC · JPL
870678	2017 DT_{23}	—	February 1, 2017	Mount Lemmon	Mount Lemmon Survey	(5)	710 m	MPC · JPL
870679	2017 DB_{27}	—	January 2, 2011	Mount Lemmon	Mount Lemmon Survey	·	2.1 km	MPC · JPL
870680	2017 DG_{28}	—	January 20, 2006	Kitt Peak	Spacewatch	EUP	2.3 km	MPC · JPL
870681	2017 DR_{28}	—	January 27, 2017	Haleakala	Pan-STARRS 1	·	530 m	MPC · JPL
870682	2017 DC_{30}	—	January 27, 2017	Mount Lemmon	Mount Lemmon Survey	·	890 m	MPC · JPL
870683	2017 DJ_{31}	—	January 3, 2017	Haleakala	Pan-STARRS 1	HNS	820 m	MPC · JPL
870684	2017 DO_{32}	—	February 18, 2017	Haleakala	Pan-STARRS 1	·	2.1 km	MPC · JPL
870685	2017 DR_{33}	—	September 30, 2005	Mauna Kea	A. Boattini	THM	1.8 km	MPC · JPL
870686	2017 DF_{36}	—	September 9, 2004	Kitt Peak	Spacewatch	·	770 m	MPC · JPL
870687	2017 DX_{36}	—	October 1, 2010	Mount Lemmon	Mount Lemmon Survey	H	370 m	MPC · JPL
870688	2017 DE_{37}	—	January 9, 2014	Kitt Peak	Spacewatch	H	490 m	MPC · JPL
870689	2017 DM_{37}	—	January 28, 2017	Haleakala	Pan-STARRS 1	H	360 m	MPC · JPL
870690	2017 DT_{38}	—	November 23, 2014	Haleakala	Pan-STARRS 1	L5	6.8 km	MPC · JPL
870691	2017 DW_{38}	—	January 28, 2017	Haleakala	Pan-STARRS 1	·	500 m	MPC · JPL
870692	2017 DF_{39}	—	July 12, 2015	Haleakala	Pan-STARRS 1	·	1.3 km	MPC · JPL
870693	2017 DV_{39}	—	September 12, 2004	Kitt Peak	Spacewatch	·	620 m	MPC · JPL
870694	2017 DC_{40}	—	August 17, 2012	Haleakala	Pan-STARRS 1	·	370 m	MPC · JPL
870695	2017 DR_{40}	—	July 25, 2014	Haleakala	Pan-STARRS 1	·	1.3 km	MPC · JPL
870696	2017 DS_{40}	—	November 24, 2006	Kitt Peak	Spacewatch	·	390 m	MPC · JPL
870697	2017 DQ_{42}	—	September 12, 2015	Haleakala	Pan-STARRS 1	·	1.2 km	MPC · JPL
870698	2017 DE_{45}	—	January 31, 2017	Haleakala	Pan-STARRS 1	·	770 m	MPC · JPL
870699	2017 DL_{45}	—	July 27, 2015	Haleakala	Pan-STARRS 1	H	390 m	MPC · JPL
870700	2017 DN_{45}	—	March 26, 2006	Anderson Mesa	LONEOS	·	2.6 km	MPC · JPL

== 870701–870800 ==
back to top

Designation			Discovery			Properties		Ref
Permanent	Provisional	Named after	Date	Site	Discoverer(s)	Category	Diam.	Ref
870701	2017 DF_{47}	—	September 9, 2015	Haleakala	Pan-STARRS 1	·	950 m	MPC · JPL
870702	2017 DE_{49}	—	July 25, 2014	Haleakala	Pan-STARRS 1	·	1.4 km	MPC · JPL
870703	2017 DQ_{51}	—	February 21, 2017	Mount Lemmon	Mount Lemmon Survey	·	2.2 km	MPC · JPL
870704	2017 DP_{53}	—	February 2, 2006	Kitt Peak	Spacewatch	·	2.0 km	MPC · JPL
870705	2017 DK_{55}	—	November 21, 2015	Mount Lemmon	Mount Lemmon Survey	·	2.3 km	MPC · JPL
870706	2017 DH_{56}	—	February 21, 2017	Mount Lemmon	Mount Lemmon Survey	·	2.2 km	MPC · JPL
870707	2017 DQ_{56}	—	November 21, 2008	Kitt Peak	Spacewatch	·	850 m	MPC · JPL
870708	2017 DV_{56}	—	February 21, 2017	Mount Lemmon	Mount Lemmon Survey	·	1.3 km	MPC · JPL
870709	2017 DC_{59}	—	February 21, 2017	Mount Lemmon	Mount Lemmon Survey	PHO	680 m	MPC · JPL
870710	2017 DH_{64}	—	February 21, 2017	Haleakala	Pan-STARRS 1	·	2.3 km	MPC · JPL
870711	2017 DS_{67}	—	October 10, 2015	Haleakala	Pan-STARRS 1	·	1.8 km	MPC · JPL
870712	2017 DH_{68}	—	October 21, 2015	Haleakala	Pan-STARRS 1	·	1.8 km	MPC · JPL
870713	2017 DL_{68}	—	March 27, 2014	Haleakala	Pan-STARRS 1	·	530 m	MPC · JPL
870714	2017 DU_{69}	—	January 27, 2017	Haleakala	Pan-STARRS 1	·	2.0 km	MPC · JPL
870715	2017 DL_{71}	—	March 31, 2013	Mount Lemmon	Mount Lemmon Survey	KON	1.4 km	MPC · JPL
870716	2017 DV_{73}	—	January 27, 2017	Haleakala	Pan-STARRS 1	H	430 m	MPC · JPL
870717	2017 DR_{76}	—	May 12, 2007	Kitt Peak	Spacewatch	·	1.3 km	MPC · JPL
870718	2017 DF_{79}	—	October 11, 2010	Mount Lemmon	Mount Lemmon Survey	·	1.2 km	MPC · JPL
870719	2017 DW_{85}	—	February 2, 2006	Mount Lemmon	Mount Lemmon Survey	·	2.3 km	MPC · JPL
870720	2017 DM_{88}	—	February 16, 2010	Mount Lemmon	Mount Lemmon Survey	(2076)	550 m	MPC · JPL
870721	2017 DC_{90}	—	February 22, 2017	Kitt Peak	Spacewatch	·	1.0 km	MPC · JPL
870722	2017 DU_{90}	—	August 23, 2014	Haleakala	Pan-STARRS 1	·	2.1 km	MPC · JPL
870723	2017 DG_{91}	—	February 22, 2017	Mount Lemmon	Mount Lemmon Survey	URS	2.5 km	MPC · JPL
870724	2017 DV_{91}	—	January 26, 2017	Haleakala	Pan-STARRS 1	EOS	1.3 km	MPC · JPL
870725	2017 DS_{92}	—	October 18, 2015	Haleakala	Pan-STARRS 1	·	1.8 km	MPC · JPL
870726	2017 DC_{96}	—	February 15, 2013	Haleakala	Pan-STARRS 1	·	1.1 km	MPC · JPL
870727	2017 DH_{96}	—	March 5, 2006	Kitt Peak	Spacewatch	·	2.3 km	MPC · JPL
870728	2017 DM_{98}	—	August 20, 2004	Kitt Peak	Spacewatch	·	620 m	MPC · JPL
870729	2017 DR_{98}	—	April 27, 2012	Haleakala	Pan-STARRS 1	·	1.8 km	MPC · JPL
870730	2017 DY_{98}	—	January 2, 2006	Mount Lemmon	Mount Lemmon Survey	·	640 m	MPC · JPL
870731	2017 DV_{100}	—	March 6, 2008	Mount Lemmon	Mount Lemmon Survey	·	1.3 km	MPC · JPL
870732	2017 DW_{100}	—	September 23, 2011	Kitt Peak	Spacewatch	·	980 m	MPC · JPL
870733	2017 DX_{101}	—	February 22, 2017	Haleakala	Pan-STARRS 1	·	2.3 km	MPC · JPL
870734	2017 DT_{102}	—	May 3, 2006	Mount Lemmon	Mount Lemmon Survey	·	840 m	MPC · JPL
870735	2017 DF_{105}	—	May 16, 2012	Mount Lemmon	Mount Lemmon Survey	·	2.2 km	MPC · JPL
870736	2017 DR_{108}	—	February 20, 2006	Kitt Peak	Spacewatch	·	730 m	MPC · JPL
870737	2017 DA_{110}	—	February 23, 2017	Haleakala	Pan-STARRS 1	·	1.1 km	MPC · JPL
870738	2017 DX_{111}	—	October 9, 2010	Kitt Peak	Spacewatch	·	1.5 km	MPC · JPL
870739	2017 DX_{112}	—	January 8, 2011	Mount Lemmon	Mount Lemmon Survey	·	2.4 km	MPC · JPL
870740	2017 DY_{113}	—	March 16, 2007	Mount Lemmon	Mount Lemmon Survey	PHO	830 m	MPC · JPL
870741	2017 DF_{114}	—	April 20, 2012	Kitt Peak	Spacewatch	·	1.9 km	MPC · JPL
870742	2017 DN_{114}	—	February 21, 2017	Haleakala	Pan-STARRS 1	·	2.6 km	MPC · JPL
870743	2017 DU_{115}	—	December 30, 2005	Kitt Peak	Spacewatch	·	1.9 km	MPC · JPL
870744	2017 DT_{119}	—	February 4, 2017	Haleakala	Pan-STARRS 1	L5	5.4 km	MPC · JPL
870745	2017 DD_{120}	—	February 24, 2017	Sacramento Peak	SDSS Collaboration	TIR	2.4 km	MPC · JPL
870746	2017 DC_{124}	—	February 21, 2017	Haleakala	Pan-STARRS 1	·	2.0 km	MPC · JPL
870747	2017 DD_{124}	—	February 25, 2017	Kitt Peak	Spacewatch	·	620 m	MPC · JPL
870748	2017 DM_{125}	—	February 21, 2017	Haleakala	Pan-STARRS 1	·	1.9 km	MPC · JPL
870749	2017 DO_{125}	—	February 21, 2017	Haleakala	Pan-STARRS 1	EOS	1.5 km	MPC · JPL
870750	2017 DU_{125}	—	February 21, 2017	Haleakala	Pan-STARRS 1	·	2.0 km	MPC · JPL
870751	2017 DY_{125}	—	February 16, 2010	Kitt Peak	Spacewatch	·	500 m	MPC · JPL
870752	2017 DC_{126}	—	February 23, 2017	Mount Lemmon	Mount Lemmon Survey	·	2.4 km	MPC · JPL
870753	2017 DF_{127}	—	January 26, 2006	Mount Lemmon	Mount Lemmon Survey	·	2.4 km	MPC · JPL
870754	2017 DL_{127}	—	February 22, 2017	Mount Lemmon	Mount Lemmon Survey	·	2.7 km	MPC · JPL
870755	2017 DU_{128}	—	February 23, 2017	Haleakala	Pan-STARRS 1	EUN	780 m	MPC · JPL
870756	2017 DB_{130}	—	February 22, 2017	Mount Lemmon	Mount Lemmon Survey	URS	1.9 km	MPC · JPL
870757	2017 DD_{130}	—	February 22, 2017	Mount Lemmon	Mount Lemmon Survey	H	360 m	MPC · JPL
870758	2017 DG_{131}	—	February 21, 2017	Haleakala	Pan-STARRS 1	·	580 m	MPC · JPL
870759	2017 DN_{131}	—	February 16, 2017	Mount Lemmon	Mount Lemmon Survey	H	340 m	MPC · JPL
870760	2017 DS_{131}	—	February 21, 2017	Haleakala	Pan-STARRS 1	H	340 m	MPC · JPL
870761	2017 DP_{132}	—	November 6, 2012	Mount Lemmon	Mount Lemmon Survey	·	450 m	MPC · JPL
870762	2017 DO_{133}	—	February 17, 2017	Haleakala	Pan-STARRS 1	·	2.8 km	MPC · JPL
870763	2017 DU_{133}	—	February 24, 2017	Haleakala	Pan-STARRS 1	·	2.0 km	MPC · JPL
870764	2017 DE_{134}	—	February 25, 2017	Kitt Peak	Spacewatch	·	2.0 km	MPC · JPL
870765	2017 DK_{134}	—	February 24, 2017	Haleakala	Pan-STARRS 1	·	2.2 km	MPC · JPL
870766	2017 DO_{134}	—	February 22, 2017	Haleakala	Pan-STARRS 1	EOS	1.5 km	MPC · JPL
870767	2017 DJ_{135}	—	February 24, 2017	Haleakala	Pan-STARRS 1	EOS	1.2 km	MPC · JPL
870768	2017 DL_{135}	—	February 24, 2017	Haleakala	Pan-STARRS 1	·	2.1 km	MPC · JPL
870769	2017 DM_{135}	—	February 25, 2017	Haleakala	Pan-STARRS 1	EOS	1.4 km	MPC · JPL
870770	2017 DN_{135}	—	February 22, 2017	Mount Lemmon	Mount Lemmon Survey	EOS	1.4 km	MPC · JPL
870771	2017 DK_{136}	—	February 22, 2017	Haleakala	Pan-STARRS 1	·	1.3 km	MPC · JPL
870772	2017 DW_{136}	—	February 18, 2017	Haleakala	Pan-STARRS 1	·	1.3 km	MPC · JPL
870773	2017 DH_{137}	—	February 24, 2017	Haleakala	Pan-STARRS 1	·	2.5 km	MPC · JPL
870774	2017 DV_{137}	—	February 24, 2017	Haleakala	Pan-STARRS 1	·	1.3 km	MPC · JPL
870775	2017 DQ_{139}	—	September 24, 2015	Mount Lemmon	Mount Lemmon Survey	·	1.9 km	MPC · JPL
870776	2017 DT_{140}	—	February 22, 2017	Mount Lemmon	Mount Lemmon Survey	EOS	1.4 km	MPC · JPL
870777	2017 DB_{141}	—	February 21, 2017	Haleakala	Pan-STARRS 1	·	650 m	MPC · JPL
870778	2017 DK_{141}	—	February 21, 2017	Haleakala	Pan-STARRS 1	·	2.3 km	MPC · JPL
870779	2017 DQ_{141}	—	February 25, 2017	Haleakala	Pan-STARRS 1	·	2.1 km	MPC · JPL
870780	2017 DH_{146}	—	February 24, 2017	Mount Lemmon	Mount Lemmon Survey	·	2.2 km	MPC · JPL
870781	2017 DX_{146}	—	February 24, 2017	Haleakala	Pan-STARRS 1	EOS	1.2 km	MPC · JPL
870782	2017 DH_{147}	—	February 21, 2017	Mount Lemmon	Mount Lemmon Survey	·	840 m	MPC · JPL
870783	2017 DS_{148}	—	February 24, 2017	Haleakala	Pan-STARRS 1	V	440 m	MPC · JPL
870784	2017 DX_{149}	—	February 22, 2017	Mount Lemmon	Mount Lemmon Survey	·	1.6 km	MPC · JPL
870785	2017 DW_{150}	—	February 22, 2017	Haleakala	Pan-STARRS 1	·	2.4 km	MPC · JPL
870786	2017 DY_{151}	—	February 21, 2017	Mount Lemmon	Mount Lemmon Survey	(2076)	580 m	MPC · JPL
870787	2017 DE_{153}	—	February 22, 2017	Mount Lemmon	Mount Lemmon Survey	·	2.2 km	MPC · JPL
870788	2017 DL_{153}	—	February 18, 2017	Haleakala	Pan-STARRS 1	·	2.2 km	MPC · JPL
870789	2017 DJ_{155}	—	February 24, 2017	Haleakala	Pan-STARRS 1	L5	7.0 km	MPC · JPL
870790	2017 DC_{161}	—	February 23, 2017	Mauna Kea	COIAS	·	1.0 km	MPC · JPL
870791	2017 DQ_{177}	—	February 21, 2017	Mauna Kea	COIAS	·	1.5 km	MPC · JPL
870792	2017 DC_{180}	—	February 21, 2017	Mauna Kea	COIAS	·	1.7 km	MPC · JPL
870793	2017 DM_{180}	—	February 27, 2017	Mauna Kea	COIAS	·	1.4 km	MPC · JPL
870794	2017 EZ_{1}	—	March 6, 2017	Haleakala	Pan-STARRS 1	H	340 m	MPC · JPL
870795	2017 EC_{2}	—	July 14, 2015	Haleakala	Pan-STARRS 1	H	500 m	MPC · JPL
870796	2017 ED_{2}	—	January 13, 2017	Haleakala	Pan-STARRS 1	·	890 m	MPC · JPL
870797	2017 EG_{2}	—	January 31, 2009	Kitt Peak	Spacewatch	H	390 m	MPC · JPL
870798	2017 EU_{3}	—	February 22, 2017	Haleakala	Pan-STARRS 1	H	400 m	MPC · JPL
870799	2017 EX_{5}	—	January 26, 2017	Haleakala	Pan-STARRS 1	H	390 m	MPC · JPL
870800	2017 ED_{6}	—	March 1, 2017	Mount Nanshan	Z. Xu, X. Gao	·	1.6 km	MPC · JPL

== 870801–870900 ==
back to top

Designation			Discovery			Properties		Ref
Permanent	Provisional	Named after	Date	Site	Discoverer(s)	Category	Diam.	Ref
870801	2017 EA_{7}	—	May 16, 2012	Kitt Peak	Spacewatch	(895)	2.7 km	MPC · JPL
870802	2017 EC_{7}	—	February 6, 2000	Socorro	LINEAR	T_{j} (2.98)	2.4 km	MPC · JPL
870803	2017 EK_{10}	—	March 4, 2017	Mount Lemmon	Mount Lemmon Survey	H	390 m	MPC · JPL
870804	2017 ET_{11}	—	January 26, 2017	Haleakala	Pan-STARRS 1	H	360 m	MPC · JPL
870805	2017 EO_{13}	—	November 29, 2003	Socorro	LINEAR	·	450 m	MPC · JPL
870806	2017 EB_{20}	—	March 23, 2012	Mount Lemmon	Mount Lemmon Survey	·	2.4 km	MPC · JPL
870807	2017 EC_{21}	—	March 29, 2012	Haleakala	Pan-STARRS 1	·	1.4 km	MPC · JPL
870808	2017 EQ_{22}	—	March 15, 2017	Magdalena Ridge	Ryan, W. H., Ryan, E. V.	T_{j} (2.89)	2.4 km	MPC · JPL
870809	2017 EQ_{24}	—	January 12, 2011	Kitt Peak	Spacewatch	LIX	2.8 km	MPC · JPL
870810	2017 ED_{26}	—	March 7, 2017	Haleakala	Pan-STARRS 1	T_{j} (2.98)	2.6 km	MPC · JPL
870811	2017 EG_{26}	—	March 2, 2017	Mount Lemmon	Mount Lemmon Survey	H	420 m	MPC · JPL
870812	2017 EH_{26}	—	March 5, 2017	Haleakala	Pan-STARRS 1	·	2.2 km	MPC · JPL
870813	2017 ET_{27}	—	March 11, 2005	Mount Lemmon	Mount Lemmon Survey	·	2.3 km	MPC · JPL
870814	2017 EF_{28}	—	March 4, 2017	Haleakala	Pan-STARRS 1	·	2.2 km	MPC · JPL
870815	2017 EG_{28}	—	March 2, 2017	Mount Lemmon	Mount Lemmon Survey	H	440 m	MPC · JPL
870816	2017 EQ_{28}	—	March 5, 2017	Haleakala	Pan-STARRS 1	·	2.5 km	MPC · JPL
870817	2017 EM_{29}	—	March 4, 2017	Mount Lemmon	Mount Lemmon Survey	H	450 m	MPC · JPL
870818	2017 EQ_{30}	—	February 25, 2011	Mount Lemmon	Mount Lemmon Survey	·	2.0 km	MPC · JPL
870819	2017 EC_{31}	—	March 7, 2017	Haleakala	Pan-STARRS 1	·	450 m	MPC · JPL
870820	2017 EB_{32}	—	March 4, 2017	Mount Lemmon	Mount Lemmon Survey	·	2.1 km	MPC · JPL
870821	2017 EX_{32}	—	March 4, 2017	Haleakala	Pan-STARRS 1	·	470 m	MPC · JPL
870822	2017 ED_{33}	—	January 28, 2017	Haleakala	Pan-STARRS 1	EOS	1.3 km	MPC · JPL
870823	2017 EY_{33}	—	March 4, 2017	Haleakala	Pan-STARRS 1	·	1.7 km	MPC · JPL
870824	2017 EQ_{35}	—	March 8, 2017	Mount Lemmon	Mount Lemmon Survey	·	1.1 km	MPC · JPL
870825	2017 ES_{35}	—	March 5, 2017	Haleakala	Pan-STARRS 1	·	2.4 km	MPC · JPL
870826	2017 EY_{37}	—	March 4, 2017	Haleakala	Pan-STARRS 1	MAS	510 m	MPC · JPL
870827	2017 EH_{38}	—	March 4, 2017	Haleakala	Pan-STARRS 1	·	850 m	MPC · JPL
870828	2017 EN_{39}	—	March 4, 2017	Haleakala	Pan-STARRS 1	·	1.7 km	MPC · JPL
870829	2017 EV_{39}	—	March 4, 2017	Haleakala	Pan-STARRS 1	EMA	2.2 km	MPC · JPL
870830	2017 EL_{42}	—	March 4, 2017	Haleakala	Pan-STARRS 1	LIX	2.5 km	MPC · JPL
870831	2017 EM_{44}	—	March 5, 2017	Haleakala	Pan-STARRS 1	·	570 m	MPC · JPL
870832	2017 EE_{45}	—	March 4, 2017	Haleakala	Pan-STARRS 1	·	2.2 km	MPC · JPL
870833	2017 EZ_{48}	—	March 27, 2012	Mount Lemmon	Mount Lemmon Survey	·	2.2 km	MPC · JPL
870834	2017 EL_{54}	—	September 25, 2019	Haleakala	Pan-STARRS 1	·	1.3 km	MPC · JPL
870835	2017 EY_{55}	—	October 20, 2020	Haleakala	Pan-STARRS 1	·	1.2 km	MPC · JPL
870836	2017 EQ_{60}	—	March 6, 2017	Mauna Kea	COIAS	·	870 m	MPC · JPL
870837	2017 FH_{2}	—	October 7, 2007	Mount Lemmon	Mount Lemmon Survey	H	410 m	MPC · JPL
870838	2017 FR_{6}	—	April 8, 2010	Mount Lemmon	Mount Lemmon Survey	NYS	730 m	MPC · JPL
870839	2017 FS_{6}	—	December 2, 2015	Haleakala	Pan-STARRS 1	·	530 m	MPC · JPL
870840	2017 FM_{8}	—	January 9, 2006	Kitt Peak	Spacewatch	·	1.9 km	MPC · JPL
870841	2017 FU_{9}	—	June 9, 2012	Mount Lemmon	Mount Lemmon Survey	·	2.6 km	MPC · JPL
870842	2017 FN_{10}	—	November 3, 2015	Mount Lemmon	Mount Lemmon Survey	T_{j} (2.98)	3.1 km	MPC · JPL
870843	2017 FH_{13}	—	December 30, 2005	Kitt Peak	Spacewatch	·	1.7 km	MPC · JPL
870844	2017 FY_{16}	—	September 20, 2008	Mount Lemmon	Mount Lemmon Survey	·	2.0 km	MPC · JPL
870845	2017 FM_{17}	—	March 16, 2013	Kitt Peak	Spacewatch	·	1.0 km	MPC · JPL
870846	2017 FE_{18}	—	December 4, 2015	Haleakala	Pan-STARRS 1	·	810 m	MPC · JPL
870847	2017 FZ_{19}	—	March 4, 2017	Haleakala	Pan-STARRS 1	·	1.3 km	MPC · JPL
870848	2017 FR_{20}	—	May 11, 2007	Mount Lemmon	Mount Lemmon Survey	·	510 m	MPC · JPL
870849	2017 FF_{21}	—	March 18, 2017	Haleakala	Pan-STARRS 1	MAS	470 m	MPC · JPL
870850	2017 FW_{23}	—	July 25, 2014	Haleakala	Pan-STARRS 1	·	670 m	MPC · JPL
870851	2017 FG_{27}	—	November 30, 2003	Kitt Peak	Spacewatch	·	2.4 km	MPC · JPL
870852	2017 FM_{29}	—	February 4, 2017	Haleakala	Pan-STARRS 1	·	1.7 km	MPC · JPL
870853	2017 FR_{30}	—	March 18, 2017	Mount Lemmon	Mount Lemmon Survey	·	2.1 km	MPC · JPL
870854	2017 FT_{37}	—	March 4, 2017	Kitt Peak	Spacewatch	·	2.3 km	MPC · JPL
870855	2017 FU_{39}	—	March 4, 2017	Haleakala	Pan-STARRS 1	·	2.0 km	MPC · JPL
870856	2017 FC_{43}	—	March 2, 2017	Mount Lemmon	Mount Lemmon Survey	·	1.6 km	MPC · JPL
870857	2017 FM_{45}	—	September 17, 2014	Haleakala	Pan-STARRS 1	·	2.7 km	MPC · JPL
870858	2017 FP_{46}	—	December 14, 2010	Mount Lemmon	Mount Lemmon Survey	·	1.4 km	MPC · JPL
870859	2017 FS_{48}	—	May 6, 2014	Haleakala	Pan-STARRS 1	·	500 m	MPC · JPL
870860	2017 FH_{50}	—	March 26, 2011	Mount Lemmon	Mount Lemmon Survey	T_{j} (2.93)	3.6 km	MPC · JPL
870861	2017 FH_{51}	—	March 11, 2008	Catalina	CSS	·	1.5 km	MPC · JPL
870862	2017 FM_{53}	—	September 28, 2011	Mount Lemmon	Mount Lemmon Survey	·	1.3 km	MPC · JPL
870863	2017 FZ_{53}	—	January 28, 2011	Mount Lemmon	Mount Lemmon Survey	·	2.4 km	MPC · JPL
870864	2017 FG_{55}	—	March 20, 2017	Mount Lemmon	Mount Lemmon Survey	·	1.5 km	MPC · JPL
870865	2017 FX_{60}	—	November 23, 2009	Mount Lemmon	Mount Lemmon Survey	·	2.2 km	MPC · JPL
870866	2017 FY_{60}	—	April 8, 2013	Mount Lemmon	Mount Lemmon Survey	·	1.0 km	MPC · JPL
870867	2017 FA_{61}	—	August 23, 2014	Haleakala	Pan-STARRS 1	·	1.9 km	MPC · JPL
870868	2017 FD_{61}	—	March 19, 2017	Mount Lemmon	Mount Lemmon Survey	·	900 m	MPC · JPL
870869	2017 FE_{62}	—	March 20, 2017	Kitt Peak	Spacewatch	·	2.1 km	MPC · JPL
870870	2017 FX_{62}	—	April 28, 2012	Mount Lemmon	Mount Lemmon Survey	·	2.5 km	MPC · JPL
870871	2017 FR_{66}	—	April 30, 2012	Mount Lemmon	Mount Lemmon Survey	·	2.6 km	MPC · JPL
870872	2017 FE_{67}	—	March 19, 2010	Mount Lemmon	Mount Lemmon Survey	PHO	710 m	MPC · JPL
870873	2017 FT_{70}	—	January 29, 2011	Mount Lemmon	Mount Lemmon Survey	·	1.4 km	MPC · JPL
870874	2017 FU_{70}	—	February 21, 2007	Kitt Peak	Spacewatch	·	470 m	MPC · JPL
870875	2017 FG_{71}	—	March 23, 2004	Socorro	LINEAR	·	1.6 km	MPC · JPL
870876	2017 FL_{72}	—	November 19, 1995	Kitt Peak	Spacewatch	·	750 m	MPC · JPL
870877	2017 FX_{72}	—	September 23, 2015	Mount Lemmon	Mount Lemmon Survey	·	1.0 km	MPC · JPL
870878	2017 FA_{73}	—	August 31, 2014	Haleakala	Pan-STARRS 1	EUN	830 m	MPC · JPL
870879	2017 FC_{75}	—	December 1, 2008	Kitt Peak	Spacewatch	V	410 m	MPC · JPL
870880	2017 FD_{75}	—	January 30, 2011	Mount Lemmon	Mount Lemmon Survey	·	1.8 km	MPC · JPL
870881	2017 FA_{77}	—	February 21, 2017	Haleakala	Pan-STARRS 1	·	2.8 km	MPC · JPL
870882	2017 FL_{78}	—	March 26, 2006	Kitt Peak	Spacewatch	NYS	850 m	MPC · JPL
870883	2017 FZ_{80}	—	October 9, 2015	Haleakala	Pan-STARRS 1	·	850 m	MPC · JPL
870884	2017 FA_{81}	—	March 20, 2017	Mount Lemmon	Mount Lemmon Survey	·	1.5 km	MPC · JPL
870885	2017 FK_{81}	—	August 22, 2014	Haleakala	Pan-STARRS 1	·	760 m	MPC · JPL
870886	2017 FD_{83}	—	October 9, 2015	Haleakala	Pan-STARRS 1	·	510 m	MPC · JPL
870887	2017 FZ_{84}	—	December 10, 2015	Haleakala	Pan-STARRS 1	·	1.8 km	MPC · JPL
870888	2017 FG_{85}	—	September 20, 2014	Haleakala	Pan-STARRS 1	·	2.1 km	MPC · JPL
870889	2017 FO_{87}	—	January 27, 2011	Mount Lemmon	Mount Lemmon Survey	·	2.2 km	MPC · JPL
870890	2017 FA_{90}	—	March 9, 2017	Mount Lemmon	Mount Lemmon Survey	H	330 m	MPC · JPL
870891	2017 FR_{98}	—	February 2, 2013	Mount Lemmon	Mount Lemmon Survey	·	710 m	MPC · JPL
870892	2017 FE_{99}	—	March 4, 2013	Haleakala	Pan-STARRS 1	·	970 m	MPC · JPL
870893	2017 FP_{99}	—	July 6, 2005	Kitt Peak	Spacewatch	·	780 m	MPC · JPL
870894	2017 FM_{100}	—	February 12, 2011	Mount Lemmon	Mount Lemmon Survey	·	2.0 km	MPC · JPL
870895	2017 FG_{104}	—	March 23, 2017	Haleakala	Pan-STARRS 1	H	400 m	MPC · JPL
870896	2017 FR_{104}	—	September 3, 2013	Haleakala	Pan-STARRS 1	·	2.5 km	MPC · JPL
870897	2017 FE_{107}	—	March 25, 2017	Haleakala	Pan-STARRS 1	·	2.2 km	MPC · JPL
870898	2017 FN_{107}	—	September 19, 2014	Haleakala	Pan-STARRS 1	·	3.1 km	MPC · JPL
870899	2017 FT_{109}	—	May 9, 2010	Mount Lemmon	Mount Lemmon Survey	V	530 m	MPC · JPL
870900	2017 FF_{111}	—	February 21, 2006	Mount Lemmon	Mount Lemmon Survey	·	2.0 km	MPC · JPL

== 870901–871000 ==
back to top

Designation			Discovery			Properties		Ref
Permanent	Provisional	Named after	Date	Site	Discoverer(s)	Category	Diam.	Ref
870901	2017 FA_{114}	—	July 27, 2014	ESA OGS	ESA OGS	MAS	510 m	MPC · JPL
870902	2017 FW_{115}	—	July 28, 2014	Haleakala	Pan-STARRS 1	·	820 m	MPC · JPL
870903	2017 FE_{117}	—	April 12, 2013	Haleakala	Pan-STARRS 1	·	830 m	MPC · JPL
870904	2017 FT_{117}	—	September 12, 2015	Haleakala	Pan-STARRS 1	(883)	540 m	MPC · JPL
870905	2017 FQ_{119}	—	January 1, 2016	Haleakala	Pan-STARRS 1	·	2.3 km	MPC · JPL
870906	2017 FX_{119}	—	March 4, 2017	Haleakala	Pan-STARRS 1	V	440 m	MPC · JPL
870907	2017 FM_{122}	—	January 30, 2017	Haleakala	Pan-STARRS 1	·	1.0 km	MPC · JPL
870908	2017 FZ_{123}	—	September 4, 2008	Kitt Peak	Spacewatch	·	500 m	MPC · JPL
870909	2017 FA_{124}	—	March 27, 2017	Mount Lemmon	Mount Lemmon Survey	·	1.7 km	MPC · JPL
870910	2017 FP_{124}	—	August 27, 2014	Haleakala	Pan-STARRS 1	VER	2.1 km	MPC · JPL
870911	2017 FF_{126}	—	March 2, 2017	Mount Lemmon	Mount Lemmon Survey	·	660 m	MPC · JPL
870912	2017 FF_{130}	—	March 19, 2017	Haleakala	Pan-STARRS 1	·	2.3 km	MPC · JPL
870913	2017 FR_{135}	—	January 29, 2011	Mount Lemmon	Mount Lemmon Survey	·	1.9 km	MPC · JPL
870914	2017 FE_{136}	—	February 28, 2012	Haleakala	Pan-STARRS 1	·	1.7 km	MPC · JPL
870915	2017 FM_{140}	—	September 26, 2011	Haleakala	Pan-STARRS 1	(1338) (FLO)	480 m	MPC · JPL
870916	2017 FU_{140}	—	April 11, 2007	Kitt Peak	Spacewatch	·	500 m	MPC · JPL
870917	2017 FS_{144}	—	September 23, 2011	Haleakala	Pan-STARRS 1	·	550 m	MPC · JPL
870918	2017 FH_{146}	—	December 4, 2015	Heaven on Earth Ob	W. K. Y. Yeung	·	2.0 km	MPC · JPL
870919	2017 FM_{148}	—	October 1, 2005	Mount Lemmon	Mount Lemmon Survey	·	530 m	MPC · JPL
870920	2017 FS_{151}	—	July 4, 2014	Haleakala	Pan-STARRS 1	·	1.0 km	MPC · JPL
870921	2017 FF_{152}	—	October 10, 2015	Haleakala	Pan-STARRS 1	·	1.2 km	MPC · JPL
870922	2017 FE_{153}	—	March 30, 2008	Kitt Peak	Spacewatch	·	1.7 km	MPC · JPL
870923	2017 FJ_{153}	—	July 14, 2013	Haleakala	Pan-STARRS 1	·	1.8 km	MPC · JPL
870924	2017 FM_{153}	—	March 8, 2017	Kitt Peak	Spacewatch	·	2.1 km	MPC · JPL
870925	2017 FW_{154}	—	August 4, 2013	Haleakala	Pan-STARRS 1	VER	1.9 km	MPC · JPL
870926	2017 FB_{155}	—	February 15, 2012	Haleakala	Pan-STARRS 1	·	1.4 km	MPC · JPL
870927	2017 FM_{161}	—	December 6, 2015	Haleakala	Pan-STARRS 1	·	2.3 km	MPC · JPL
870928	2017 FV_{163}	—	March 23, 2017	Haleakala	Pan-STARRS 1	·	2.4 km	MPC · JPL
870929	2017 FX_{164}	—	March 19, 2017	Haleakala	Pan-STARRS 1	·	2.3 km	MPC · JPL
870930	2017 FP_{165}	—	March 19, 2017	Mount Lemmon	Mount Lemmon Survey	·	2.0 km	MPC · JPL
870931	2017 FF_{166}	—	March 23, 2017	Haleakala	Pan-STARRS 1	·	890 m	MPC · JPL
870932	2017 FX_{166}	—	December 14, 2015	Mount Lemmon	Mount Lemmon Survey	·	2.3 km	MPC · JPL
870933	2017 FG_{167}	—	March 20, 2017	Haleakala	Pan-STARRS 1	·	2.5 km	MPC · JPL
870934	2017 FQ_{169}	—	March 18, 2017	Haleakala	Pan-STARRS 1	URS	2.4 km	MPC · JPL
870935	2017 FX_{170}	—	March 31, 2017	Haleakala	Pan-STARRS 1	H	280 m	MPC · JPL
870936	2017 FJ_{171}	—	March 26, 2017	Haleakala	Pan-STARRS 1	·	840 m	MPC · JPL
870937	2017 FS_{172}	—	March 19, 2017	Haleakala	Pan-STARRS 1	·	1.4 km	MPC · JPL
870938	2017 FY_{172}	—	March 27, 2017	Haleakala	Pan-STARRS 1	·	2.1 km	MPC · JPL
870939	2017 FB_{174}	—	March 21, 2017	Haleakala	Pan-STARRS 1	·	1.3 km	MPC · JPL
870940	2017 FF_{175}	—	March 29, 2017	Haleakala	Pan-STARRS 1	EOS	1.2 km	MPC · JPL
870941	2017 FH_{175}	—	March 24, 2017	Haleakala	Pan-STARRS 1	·	1.3 km	MPC · JPL
870942	2017 FP_{175}	—	March 21, 2017	Mount Lemmon	Mount Lemmon Survey	·	2.0 km	MPC · JPL
870943	2017 FH_{176}	—	March 20, 2017	Haleakala	Pan-STARRS 1	·	1.1 km	MPC · JPL
870944	2017 FP_{176}	—	March 19, 2017	Haleakala	Pan-STARRS 1	·	2.3 km	MPC · JPL
870945	2017 FR_{176}	—	March 21, 2017	Haleakala	Pan-STARRS 1	·	1.4 km	MPC · JPL
870946	2017 FR_{177}	—	March 23, 2017	Haleakala	Pan-STARRS 1	·	1.1 km	MPC · JPL
870947	2017 FC_{178}	—	March 19, 2017	Haleakala	Pan-STARRS 1	·	410 m	MPC · JPL
870948	2017 FG_{178}	—	March 26, 2017	Haleakala	Pan-STARRS 1	·	790 m	MPC · JPL
870949	2017 FU_{178}	—	March 21, 2017	Haleakala	Pan-STARRS 1	·	640 m	MPC · JPL
870950	2017 FC_{179}	—	March 28, 2017	Haleakala	Pan-STARRS 1	·	2.2 km	MPC · JPL
870951	2017 FD_{180}	—	March 21, 2017	Haleakala	Pan-STARRS 1	·	1.6 km	MPC · JPL
870952	2017 FM_{180}	—	March 27, 2017	Haleakala	Pan-STARRS 1	·	2.4 km	MPC · JPL
870953	2017 FR_{180}	—	March 21, 2017	Haleakala	Pan-STARRS 1	·	1.4 km	MPC · JPL
870954	2017 FK_{181}	—	March 18, 2017	Mount Lemmon	Mount Lemmon Survey	URS	2.2 km	MPC · JPL
870955	2017 FP_{181}	—	March 21, 2017	Haleakala	Pan-STARRS 1	·	2.1 km	MPC · JPL
870956	2017 FS_{181}	—	March 19, 2017	Mount Lemmon	Mount Lemmon Survey	·	1.5 km	MPC · JPL
870957	2017 FC_{182}	—	March 29, 2017	Haleakala	Pan-STARRS 1	·	2.2 km	MPC · JPL
870958	2017 FD_{182}	—	March 18, 2017	Mount Lemmon	Mount Lemmon Survey	EOS	1.3 km	MPC · JPL
870959	2017 FE_{182}	—	March 19, 2017	Haleakala	Pan-STARRS 1	·	2.3 km	MPC · JPL
870960	2017 FF_{183}	—	March 26, 2017	Mount Lemmon	Mount Lemmon Survey	·	1.2 km	MPC · JPL
870961	2017 FS_{183}	—	March 21, 2017	Haleakala	Pan-STARRS 1	EOS	1.2 km	MPC · JPL
870962	2017 FB_{184}	—	March 21, 2017	Haleakala	Pan-STARRS 1	EOS	1.2 km	MPC · JPL
870963	2017 FD_{184}	—	March 21, 2017	Haleakala	Pan-STARRS 1	·	2.3 km	MPC · JPL
870964	2017 FR_{184}	—	March 19, 2017	Haleakala	Pan-STARRS 1	·	2.1 km	MPC · JPL
870965	2017 FU_{187}	—	March 19, 2017	Haleakala	Pan-STARRS 1	·	2.1 km	MPC · JPL
870966	2017 FJ_{189}	—	March 25, 2017	Mount Lemmon	Mount Lemmon Survey	HNS	690 m	MPC · JPL
870967	2017 FA_{193}	—	March 19, 2017	Haleakala	Pan-STARRS 1	·	2.2 km	MPC · JPL
870968	2017 FJ_{194}	—	March 29, 2017	Haleakala	Pan-STARRS 1	V	430 m	MPC · JPL
870969	2017 FF_{195}	—	March 19, 2017	Haleakala	Pan-STARRS 1	·	2.2 km	MPC · JPL
870970	2017 FQ_{195}	—	March 21, 2017	Haleakala	Pan-STARRS 1	H	330 m	MPC · JPL
870971	2017 FM_{197}	—	March 29, 2017	Haleakala	Pan-STARRS 1	·	670 m	MPC · JPL
870972	2017 FX_{197}	—	March 21, 2017	Haleakala	Pan-STARRS 1	·	2.2 km	MPC · JPL
870973	2017 FG_{198}	—	February 21, 2017	Haleakala	Pan-STARRS 1	·	510 m	MPC · JPL
870974	2017 FF_{199}	—	March 2, 2011	Mount Lemmon	Mount Lemmon Survey	·	2.2 km	MPC · JPL
870975	2017 FF_{200}	—	March 19, 2017	Haleakala	Pan-STARRS 1	·	2.2 km	MPC · JPL
870976	2017 FJ_{200}	—	February 21, 2017	Haleakala	Pan-STARRS 1	·	2.2 km	MPC · JPL
870977	2017 FA_{204}	—	December 18, 2015	Mount Lemmon	Mount Lemmon Survey	LIX	2.4 km	MPC · JPL
870978	2017 FK_{204}	—	March 26, 2017	Mount Lemmon	Mount Lemmon Survey	THM	1.8 km	MPC · JPL
870979	2017 FK_{205}	—	March 21, 2017	Haleakala	Pan-STARRS 1	VER	2.0 km	MPC · JPL
870980	2017 FT_{205}	—	March 20, 2017	Haleakala	Pan-STARRS 1	·	1.7 km	MPC · JPL
870981	2017 FZ_{206}	—	March 25, 2017	Mount Lemmon	Mount Lemmon Survey	·	1.5 km	MPC · JPL
870982	2017 FO_{207}	—	March 21, 2017	Haleakala	Pan-STARRS 1	·	2.3 km	MPC · JPL
870983	2017 FS_{207}	—	March 20, 2017	Haleakala	Pan-STARRS 1	·	2.0 km	MPC · JPL
870984	2017 FX_{207}	—	March 21, 2017	Haleakala	Pan-STARRS 1	·	2.2 km	MPC · JPL
870985	2017 FA_{208}	—	April 19, 2006	Mount Lemmon	Mount Lemmon Survey	VER	2.1 km	MPC · JPL
870986	2017 FE_{209}	—	March 21, 2017	Haleakala	Pan-STARRS 1	·	2.0 km	MPC · JPL
870987	2017 FK_{210}	—	March 19, 2017	Haleakala	Pan-STARRS 1	·	1.5 km	MPC · JPL
870988	2017 FN_{212}	—	September 22, 2009	Mount Lemmon	Mount Lemmon Survey	·	1.4 km	MPC · JPL
870989	2017 FN_{213}	—	March 20, 2017	Haleakala	Pan-STARRS 1	·	2.7 km	MPC · JPL
870990	2017 FR_{214}	—	March 19, 2017	Haleakala	Pan-STARRS 1	CLA	1.1 km	MPC · JPL
870991	2017 FF_{216}	—	March 18, 2017	Haleakala	Pan-STARRS 1	·	740 m	MPC · JPL
870992	2017 FG_{216}	—	March 19, 2017	Haleakala	Pan-STARRS 1	·	500 m	MPC · JPL
870993	2017 FD_{218}	—	March 18, 2017	Haleakala	Pan-STARRS 1	·	2.3 km	MPC · JPL
870994	2017 FN_{218}	—	March 20, 2017	Mount Lemmon	Mount Lemmon Survey	·	2.4 km	MPC · JPL
870995	2017 FB_{219}	—	March 18, 2017	Mount Lemmon	Mount Lemmon Survey	·	2.1 km	MPC · JPL
870996	2017 FR_{219}	—	March 29, 2017	Haleakala	Pan-STARRS 1	·	2.0 km	MPC · JPL
870997	2017 FX_{219}	—	November 23, 2014	Mount Lemmon	Mount Lemmon Survey	·	2.3 km	MPC · JPL
870998	2017 FC_{220}	—	March 25, 2017	Mount Lemmon	Mount Lemmon Survey	·	2.0 km	MPC · JPL
870999	2017 FZ_{222}	—	June 1, 2012	Mount Lemmon	Mount Lemmon Survey	·	1.9 km	MPC · JPL
871000	2017 FF_{233}	—	March 19, 2017	Haleakala	Pan-STARRS 1	·	700 m	MPC · JPL

back to top

== Meaning of names ==
As minor planet discoveries are confirmed, they are given a permanent number by the IAU's Minor Planet Center (MPC), and the discoverers can then submit names for them, following the IAU's naming conventions. The list below concerns those minor planets in the specified number-range that have received names, and explains the meanings of those names.

Official naming citations of newly named small Solar System bodies are approved and published in a bulletin by IAU's Working Group for Small Bodies Nomenclature (WGSBN). Before May 2021, citations were published in MPC's Minor Planet Circulars for many decades. Recent citations can also be found on the JPL Small-Body Database (SBDB). Until his death in 2016, German astronomer Lutz D. Schmadel compiled these citations into the Dictionary of Minor Planet Names (DMP) and regularly updated the collection.

Based on Paul Herget's The Names of the Minor Planets, Schmadel also researched the unclear origin of numerous asteroids, most of which had been named prior to World War II. This article incorporates text from this source, which is in the public domain: SBDB New namings may only be added to this list below after official publication as the preannouncement of names is condemned. The WGSBN publishes a comprehensive guideline for the naming rules of non-cometary small Solar System bodies.

Named minor planet	Provisional	This minor planet was named for...	Ref · Catalog
870437 Leilani	2017 AS_{63}	Leilani is a Hawaiian name meaning “heavenly necklace of flowers” or “royal child of heaven.” It is also the name of a community in the Puna district of the Island of Hawaiʻi that suffered extensive destruction during the 2018 Kīlauea eruption.	IAU · 868349
