= List of minor planets: 868001–869000 =

The following is a partial list of minor planets, running from minor-planet number 868001 through 869000, inclusive. The primary data for this and other partial lists is based on JPL's "Small-Body Orbital Elements" and data available from the Minor Planet Center. Critical list information is also provided by the MPC, unless otherwise specified from Lowell Observatory. A detailed description of the table's columns and additional sources are given on the main page including a complete list of every page in this series, and a statistical break-up on the dynamical classification of minor planets.

Also see the summary list of all named bodies in numerical and alphabetical order, and the corresponding naming citations for the number range of this particular list. New namings may only be added to this list after official publication, as the preannouncement of names is condemned by the Working Group for Small Bodies Nomenclature of the International Astronomical Union.

Near-Earth obj.	MBA (inner)	MBA (outer)	Centaur
Mars-crosser	MBA (middle)	Jupiter trojan	Trans-Neptunian obj.
Unclassified

== 868001–868100 ==
Designation			Discovery			Properties		Ref
Permanent	Provisional	Named after	Date	Site	Discoverer(s)	Category	Diam.	Ref
868001	2016 AC_{314}	—	January 3, 2016	Mount Lemmon	Mount Lemmon Survey	·	910 m	MPC · JPL
868002	2016 AB_{315}	—	January 13, 2016	Haleakala	Pan-STARRS 1	·	680 m	MPC · JPL
868003	2016 AW_{315}	—	January 11, 2016	Haleakala	Pan-STARRS 1	·	1.6 km	MPC · JPL
868004	2016 AZ_{315}	—	January 2, 2016	Mount Lemmon	Mount Lemmon Survey	·	480 m	MPC · JPL
868005	2016 AA_{316}	—	January 3, 2016	Haleakala	Pan-STARRS 1	·	2.3 km	MPC · JPL
868006	2016 AC_{316}	—	January 3, 2016	Haleakala	Pan-STARRS 1	·	670 m	MPC · JPL
868007	2016 AH_{316}	—	January 4, 2016	Haleakala	Pan-STARRS 1	·	2.1 km	MPC · JPL
868008	2016 AO_{316}	—	January 7, 2016	Haleakala	Pan-STARRS 1	·	1.4 km	MPC · JPL
868009	2016 AX_{316}	—	January 4, 2016	Haleakala	Pan-STARRS 1	·	2.2 km	MPC · JPL
868010	2016 AL_{317}	—	January 11, 2016	Haleakala	Pan-STARRS 1	·	1.3 km	MPC · JPL
868011	2016 AM_{317}	—	January 4, 2016	Haleakala	Pan-STARRS 1	·	1.9 km	MPC · JPL
868012	2016 AP_{317}	—	January 4, 2016	Haleakala	Pan-STARRS 1	·	2.2 km	MPC · JPL
868013	2016 AB_{319}	—	January 7, 2016	Haleakala	Pan-STARRS 1	EOS	1.4 km	MPC · JPL
868014	2016 AO_{319}	—	January 4, 2016	Haleakala	Pan-STARRS 1	·	2.0 km	MPC · JPL
868015	2016 AD_{320}	—	January 5, 2016	Haleakala	Pan-STARRS 1	PHO	630 m	MPC · JPL
868016	2016 AV_{320}	—	January 4, 2016	Haleakala	Pan-STARRS 1	·	540 m	MPC · JPL
868017	2016 AU_{321}	—	January 14, 2016	Haleakala	Pan-STARRS 1	VER	1.8 km	MPC · JPL
868018	2016 AL_{324}	—	January 3, 2016	Haleakala	Pan-STARRS 1	·	2.2 km	MPC · JPL
868019	2016 AR_{324}	—	January 2, 2016	Haleakala	Pan-STARRS 1	·	2.2 km	MPC · JPL
868020	2016 AL_{325}	—	January 4, 2016	Haleakala	Pan-STARRS 1	·	1.9 km	MPC · JPL
868021	2016 AS_{325}	—	January 2, 2016	Mount Lemmon	Mount Lemmon Survey	·	1.8 km	MPC · JPL
868022	2016 AW_{325}	—	January 4, 2016	Haleakala	Pan-STARRS 1	·	1.6 km	MPC · JPL
868023	2016 AZ_{325}	—	January 7, 2016	Haleakala	Pan-STARRS 1	VER	1.8 km	MPC · JPL
868024	2016 AH_{327}	—	January 12, 2016	Haleakala	Pan-STARRS 1	·	2.0 km	MPC · JPL
868025	2016 AU_{327}	—	January 12, 2016	Haleakala	Pan-STARRS 1	·	2.6 km	MPC · JPL
868026	2016 AW_{327}	—	January 14, 2016	Haleakala	Pan-STARRS 1	·	2.3 km	MPC · JPL
868027	2016 AZ_{327}	—	January 3, 2016	Mount Lemmon	Mount Lemmon Survey	EOS	1.2 km	MPC · JPL
868028	2016 AS_{328}	—	January 9, 2016	Haleakala	Pan-STARRS 1	·	2.0 km	MPC · JPL
868029	2016 AT_{328}	—	January 14, 2016	Haleakala	Pan-STARRS 1	·	2.1 km	MPC · JPL
868030	2016 AX_{328}	—	January 4, 2016	Haleakala	Pan-STARRS 1	·	2.1 km	MPC · JPL
868031	2016 AA_{332}	—	January 3, 2016	Mount Lemmon	Mount Lemmon Survey	·	2.2 km	MPC · JPL
868032	2016 AG_{332}	—	January 3, 2016	Mount Lemmon	Mount Lemmon Survey	·	2.2 km	MPC · JPL
868033	2016 AP_{334}	—	January 13, 2016	Haleakala	Pan-STARRS 1	·	2.2 km	MPC · JPL
868034	2016 AL_{335}	—	January 12, 2016	Haleakala	Pan-STARRS 1	·	2.3 km	MPC · JPL
868035	2016 AA_{338}	—	January 11, 2016	Haleakala	Pan-STARRS 1	·	2.3 km	MPC · JPL
868036	2016 AB_{338}	—	January 11, 2016	Haleakala	Pan-STARRS 1	·	2.2 km	MPC · JPL
868037	2016 AC_{338}	—	January 4, 2016	Haleakala	Pan-STARRS 1	·	2.2 km	MPC · JPL
868038	2016 AV_{339}	—	January 9, 2016	Haleakala	Pan-STARRS 1	·	1.5 km	MPC · JPL
868039	2016 AZ_{339}	—	January 14, 2016	Haleakala	Pan-STARRS 1	·	1.5 km	MPC · JPL
868040	2016 AW_{343}	—	July 28, 2014	Haleakala	Pan-STARRS 1	·	780 m	MPC · JPL
868041	2016 AD_{346}	—	January 12, 2016	Haleakala	Pan-STARRS 1	·	730 m	MPC · JPL
868042	2016 AS_{346}	—	January 4, 2016	Haleakala	Pan-STARRS 1	·	2.6 km	MPC · JPL
868043	2016 AT_{346}	—	January 4, 2016	Haleakala	Pan-STARRS 1	·	2.3 km	MPC · JPL
868044	2016 AL_{349}	—	January 14, 2016	Haleakala	Pan-STARRS 1	·	880 m	MPC · JPL
868045	2016 AP_{349}	—	January 13, 2016	Haleakala	Pan-STARRS 1	·	2.2 km	MPC · JPL
868046	2016 AY_{350}	—	January 14, 2016	Haleakala	Pan-STARRS 1	H	290 m	MPC · JPL
868047	2016 AC_{352}	—	January 9, 2016	Haleakala	Pan-STARRS 1	URS	2.4 km	MPC · JPL
868048	2016 AO_{352}	—	January 4, 2016	Haleakala	Pan-STARRS 1	·	880 m	MPC · JPL
868049	2016 AC_{353}	—	January 4, 2016	Haleakala	Pan-STARRS 1	·	850 m	MPC · JPL
868050	2016 AP_{356}	—	January 4, 2016	Haleakala	Pan-STARRS 1	·	470 m	MPC · JPL
868051	2016 AA_{357}	—	January 4, 2016	Haleakala	Pan-STARRS 1	·	510 m	MPC · JPL
868052	2016 AF_{361}	—	January 2, 2016	Mount Lemmon	Mount Lemmon Survey	·	1.9 km	MPC · JPL
868053	2016 AQ_{361}	—	January 4, 2016	Haleakala	Pan-STARRS 1	·	2.1 km	MPC · JPL
868054	2016 AM_{364}	—	January 3, 2016	Haleakala	Pan-STARRS 1	VER	1.8 km	MPC · JPL
868055	2016 AT_{367}	—	January 5, 2016	Haleakala	Pan-STARRS 1	·	2.2 km	MPC · JPL
868056	2016 AX_{368}	—	January 12, 2016	Haleakala	Pan-STARRS 1	·	750 m	MPC · JPL
868057	2016 AM_{371}	—	January 4, 2016	Haleakala	Pan-STARRS 1	KOR	1.0 km	MPC · JPL
868058	2016 AN_{373}	—	January 14, 2016	Haleakala	Pan-STARRS 1	ELF	2.4 km	MPC · JPL
868059	2016 AK_{376}	—	January 3, 2016	Haleakala	Pan-STARRS 1	·	800 m	MPC · JPL
868060	2016 AO_{377}	—	January 2, 2016	Haleakala	Pan-STARRS 1	·	540 m	MPC · JPL
868061	2016 AQ_{378}	—	January 2, 2016	Mount Lemmon	Mount Lemmon Survey	L5	8.2 km	MPC · JPL
868062	2016 AY_{385}	—	September 18, 2006	Kitt Peak	Spacewatch	·	960 m	MPC · JPL
868063	2016 AJ_{395}	—	November 21, 2014	Haleakala	Pan-STARRS 1	L5	5.7 km	MPC · JPL
868064	2016 AN_{398}	—	November 26, 2014	Haleakala	Pan-STARRS 1	L5	5.8 km	MPC · JPL
868065	2016 AD_{405}	—	August 20, 2014	Haleakala	Pan-STARRS 1	·	2.1 km	MPC · JPL
868066	2016 AN_{405}	—	January 14, 2016	Haleakala	Pan-STARRS 1	·	2.1 km	MPC · JPL
868067	2016 BC_{10}	—	February 12, 2008	Kitt Peak	Spacewatch	H	330 m	MPC · JPL
868068	2016 BH_{11}	—	March 1, 2009	Mount Lemmon	Mount Lemmon Survey	·	590 m	MPC · JPL
868069	2016 BT_{11}	—	October 2, 2014	Haleakala	Pan-STARRS 1	·	1.3 km	MPC · JPL
868070	2016 BX_{11}	—	January 15, 2010	Catalina	CSS	·	2.3 km	MPC · JPL
868071	2016 BK_{16}	—	August 8, 2013	Haleakala	Pan-STARRS 1	·	2.4 km	MPC · JPL
868072	2016 BO_{17}	—	September 18, 2014	Haleakala	Pan-STARRS 1	THM	1.7 km	MPC · JPL
868073	2016 BP_{18}	—	January 25, 2009	Kitt Peak	Spacewatch	·	620 m	MPC · JPL
868074	2016 BK_{19}	—	January 8, 2016	Haleakala	Pan-STARRS 1	NYS	880 m	MPC · JPL
868075	2016 BM_{19}	—	February 16, 2012	Haleakala	Pan-STARRS 1	(5)	840 m	MPC · JPL
868076	2016 BQ_{20}	—	January 7, 2016	Haleakala	Pan-STARRS 1	·	450 m	MPC · JPL
868077	2016 BS_{20}	—	January 7, 2016	Haleakala	Pan-STARRS 1	·	2.2 km	MPC · JPL
868078	2016 BL_{22}	—	January 8, 2016	Haleakala	Pan-STARRS 1	·	830 m	MPC · JPL
868079	2016 BZ_{25}	—	January 28, 2016	Mount Lemmon	Mount Lemmon Survey	·	2.2 km	MPC · JPL
868080	2016 BN_{28}	—	January 2, 2016	Haleakala	Pan-STARRS 1	·	440 m	MPC · JPL
868081	2016 BV_{28}	—	October 30, 2014	Haleakala	Pan-STARRS 1	·	2.2 km	MPC · JPL
868082	2016 BP_{30}	—	November 30, 2008	Kitt Peak	Spacewatch	·	450 m	MPC · JPL
868083	2016 BX_{30}	—	March 4, 2006	Kitt Peak	Spacewatch	·	480 m	MPC · JPL
868084	2016 BZ_{30}	—	October 15, 2009	Mount Lemmon	Mount Lemmon Survey	·	1.3 km	MPC · JPL
868085	2016 BH_{31}	—	October 24, 2011	Haleakala	Pan-STARRS 1	·	700 m	MPC · JPL
868086	2016 BJ_{31}	—	December 1, 2003	Kitt Peak	Spacewatch	·	2.2 km	MPC · JPL
868087	2016 BL_{31}	—	October 28, 2014	Haleakala	Pan-STARRS 1	VER	2.0 km	MPC · JPL
868088	2016 BA_{32}	—	September 19, 2014	Haleakala	Pan-STARRS 1	·	2.3 km	MPC · JPL
868089	2016 BW_{34}	—	July 14, 2013	Haleakala	Pan-STARRS 1	EOS	1.4 km	MPC · JPL
868090	2016 BZ_{34}	—	April 30, 2009	Kitt Peak	Spacewatch	·	940 m	MPC · JPL
868091	2016 BD_{36}	—	October 27, 2014	Haleakala	Pan-STARRS 1	LIX	3.2 km	MPC · JPL
868092	2016 BD_{37}	—	January 29, 2016	Haleakala	Pan-STARRS 1	·	520 m	MPC · JPL
868093	2016 BH_{38}	—	July 25, 2014	Haleakala	Pan-STARRS 1	·	1.3 km	MPC · JPL
868094	2016 BM_{38}	—	October 24, 2011	Haleakala	Pan-STARRS 1	·	440 m	MPC · JPL
868095	2016 BS_{38}	—	October 2, 2014	Mount Lemmon	Mount Lemmon Survey	·	2.0 km	MPC · JPL
868096	2016 BE_{39}	—	December 9, 2015	Haleakala	Pan-STARRS 1	T_{j} (2.9)	2.5 km	MPC · JPL
868097	2016 BK_{41}	—	September 19, 2014	Haleakala	Pan-STARRS 1	·	1.2 km	MPC · JPL
868098	2016 BG_{45}	—	July 7, 2014	Haleakala	Pan-STARRS 1	·	1.6 km	MPC · JPL
868099	2016 BP_{45}	—	August 8, 2013	Haleakala	Pan-STARRS 1	·	2.2 km	MPC · JPL
868100	2016 BE_{46}	—	November 22, 2015	Mount Lemmon	Mount Lemmon Survey	·	2.1 km	MPC · JPL

== 868101–868200 ==
back to top

Designation			Discovery			Properties		Ref
Permanent	Provisional	Named after	Date	Site	Discoverer(s)	Category	Diam.	Ref
868101	2016 BG_{46}	—	January 4, 2016	Haleakala	Pan-STARRS 1	·	2.2 km	MPC · JPL
868102	2016 BS_{47}	—	January 7, 2016	Haleakala	Pan-STARRS 1	·	650 m	MPC · JPL
868103	2016 BT_{47}	—	October 1, 2014	Haleakala	Pan-STARRS 1	·	2.3 km	MPC · JPL
868104	2016 BD_{48}	—	January 7, 2016	Haleakala	Pan-STARRS 1	·	2.1 km	MPC · JPL
868105	2016 BN_{48}	—	September 24, 2011	Mount Lemmon	Mount Lemmon Survey	·	450 m	MPC · JPL
868106	2016 BR_{48}	—	February 20, 2009	Kitt Peak	Spacewatch	·	630 m	MPC · JPL
868107	2016 BH_{50}	—	November 29, 2003	Kingsnake	J. V. McClusky	·	2.6 km	MPC · JPL
868108	2016 BR_{50}	—	November 22, 2015	Mount Lemmon	Mount Lemmon Survey	(5)	920 m	MPC · JPL
868109	2016 BD_{54}	—	January 30, 2016	Mount Lemmon	Mount Lemmon Survey	·	2.0 km	MPC · JPL
868110	2016 BQ_{55}	—	September 27, 2011	Mount Lemmon	Mount Lemmon Survey	·	570 m	MPC · JPL
868111	2016 BF_{57}	—	July 29, 2014	Haleakala	Pan-STARRS 1	·	720 m	MPC · JPL
868112	2016 BR_{59}	—	February 4, 2005	Kitt Peak	Spacewatch	·	2.0 km	MPC · JPL
868113	2016 BY_{59}	—	January 9, 2016	Haleakala	Pan-STARRS 1	·	2.2 km	MPC · JPL
868114	2016 BC_{61}	—	October 2, 2014	Haleakala	Pan-STARRS 1	·	1.6 km	MPC · JPL
868115	2016 BT_{61}	—	July 8, 2014	Haleakala	Pan-STARRS 1	·	1.9 km	MPC · JPL
868116	2016 BL_{62}	—	January 4, 2016	Haleakala	Pan-STARRS 1	·	530 m	MPC · JPL
868117	2016 BC_{66}	—	January 7, 2016	Haleakala	Pan-STARRS 1	·	2.4 km	MPC · JPL
868118	2016 BC_{68}	—	October 2, 2008	Kitt Peak	Spacewatch	·	2.3 km	MPC · JPL
868119	2016 BF_{68}	—	January 14, 2016	Haleakala	Pan-STARRS 1	·	2.3 km	MPC · JPL
868120	2016 BK_{68}	—	January 8, 2016	Haleakala	Pan-STARRS 1	·	1.8 km	MPC · JPL
868121	2016 BH_{69}	—	February 3, 2012	Haleakala	Pan-STARRS 1	·	830 m	MPC · JPL
868122	2016 BQ_{74}	—	January 31, 2016	Haleakala	Pan-STARRS 1	(1298)	2.0 km	MPC · JPL
868123	2016 BQ_{77}	—	September 20, 2014	Haleakala	Pan-STARRS 1	·	2.4 km	MPC · JPL
868124	2016 BB_{78}	—	January 14, 2016	Haleakala	Pan-STARRS 1	·	510 m	MPC · JPL
868125	2016 BW_{78}	—	October 5, 2014	Kitt Peak	Spacewatch	THM	1.6 km	MPC · JPL
868126	2016 BH_{79}	—	November 22, 2005	Kitt Peak	Spacewatch	·	1.3 km	MPC · JPL
868127	2016 BD_{81}	—	February 3, 2009	Mount Lemmon	Mount Lemmon Survey	·	660 m	MPC · JPL
868128	2016 BH_{82}	—	January 30, 2016	Haleakala	Pan-STARRS 1	H	330 m	MPC · JPL
868129	2016 BJ_{82}	—	January 30, 2016	Haleakala	Pan-STARRS 1	H	350 m	MPC · JPL
868130	2016 BV_{82}	—	February 12, 2011	Mount Lemmon	Mount Lemmon Survey	H	350 m	MPC · JPL
868131	2016 BV_{84}	—	January 17, 2016	Haleakala	Pan-STARRS 1	·	2.0 km	MPC · JPL
868132	2016 BB_{85}	—	January 17, 2016	Haleakala	Pan-STARRS 1	·	2.1 km	MPC · JPL
868133	2016 BX_{92}	—	January 17, 2016	Haleakala	Pan-STARRS 1	·	1.3 km	MPC · JPL
868134	2016 BD_{98}	—	January 17, 2016	Haleakala	Pan-STARRS 1	·	940 m	MPC · JPL
868135	2016 BF_{101}	—	January 18, 2016	Haleakala	Pan-STARRS 1	·	1.3 km	MPC · JPL
868136	2016 BV_{101}	—	August 27, 2014	Haleakala	Pan-STARRS 1	·	720 m	MPC · JPL
868137	2016 BJ_{103}	—	August 3, 2014	Haleakala	Pan-STARRS 1	MAR	700 m	MPC · JPL
868138	2016 BD_{104}	—	January 13, 2016	Kitt Peak	Spacewatch	·	1.9 km	MPC · JPL
868139	2016 BR_{105}	—	July 14, 2013	Haleakala	Pan-STARRS 1	KOR	950 m	MPC · JPL
868140	2016 BC_{106}	—	January 17, 2016	Haleakala	Pan-STARRS 1	·	2.4 km	MPC · JPL
868141	2016 BK_{108}	—	January 17, 2016	Haleakala	Pan-STARRS 1	·	540 m	MPC · JPL
868142	2016 BF_{109}	—	January 17, 2016	Haleakala	Pan-STARRS 1	·	490 m	MPC · JPL
868143	2016 BP_{109}	—	January 31, 2016	Haleakala	Pan-STARRS 1	PHO	600 m	MPC · JPL
868144	2016 BX_{109}	—	January 29, 2016	Haleakala	Pan-STARRS 1	·	740 m	MPC · JPL
868145	2016 BZ_{110}	—	January 16, 2016	Haleakala	Pan-STARRS 1	PHO	570 m	MPC · JPL
868146	2016 BM_{112}	—	January 16, 2016	Haleakala	Pan-STARRS 1	EUN	790 m	MPC · JPL
868147	2016 BN_{112}	—	January 29, 2016	Mount Lemmon	Mount Lemmon Survey	·	2.4 km	MPC · JPL
868148	2016 BO_{112}	—	February 8, 2011	Mount Lemmon	Mount Lemmon Survey	·	1.1 km	MPC · JPL
868149	2016 BU_{112}	—	January 16, 2016	Haleakala	Pan-STARRS 1	·	1.9 km	MPC · JPL
868150	2016 BV_{113}	—	January 28, 2016	Mount Lemmon	Mount Lemmon Survey	·	560 m	MPC · JPL
868151	2016 BM_{114}	—	January 29, 2016	Mount Lemmon	Mount Lemmon Survey	V	380 m	MPC · JPL
868152	2016 BQ_{114}	—	January 30, 2016	Mount Lemmon	Mount Lemmon Survey	·	1.9 km	MPC · JPL
868153	2016 BV_{115}	—	January 29, 2016	Kitt Peak	Spacewatch	·	540 m	MPC · JPL
868154	2016 BS_{116}	—	January 31, 2016	Haleakala	Pan-STARRS 1	(1298)	2.2 km	MPC · JPL
868155	2016 BW_{118}	—	January 17, 2016	Haleakala	Pan-STARRS 1	·	2.5 km	MPC · JPL
868156	2016 BQ_{127}	—	January 31, 2016	Haleakala	Pan-STARRS 1	H	370 m	MPC · JPL
868157	2016 BS_{129}	—	January 30, 2016	Mount Lemmon	Mount Lemmon Survey	V	490 m	MPC · JPL
868158	2016 BK_{133}	—	January 31, 2016	Haleakala	Pan-STARRS 1	·	2.3 km	MPC · JPL
868159	2016 BL_{133}	—	January 16, 2016	Haleakala	Pan-STARRS 1	·	2.3 km	MPC · JPL
868160	2016 BR_{133}	—	January 31, 2016	Haleakala	Pan-STARRS 1	·	2.2 km	MPC · JPL
868161	2016 BU_{133}	—	January 16, 2016	Haleakala	Pan-STARRS 1	·	2.2 km	MPC · JPL
868162	2016 BE_{134}	—	January 18, 2016	Mount Lemmon	Mount Lemmon Survey	·	900 m	MPC · JPL
868163	2016 BN_{134}	—	January 18, 2016	Haleakala	Pan-STARRS 1	·	810 m	MPC · JPL
868164	2016 BH_{135}	—	January 30, 2016	Mount Lemmon	Mount Lemmon Survey	·	2.1 km	MPC · JPL
868165	2016 BK_{141}	—	January 30, 2016	Mount Lemmon	Mount Lemmon Survey	·	1.2 km	MPC · JPL
868166	2016 BJ_{142}	—	April 12, 2013	Haleakala	Pan-STARRS 1	NYS	660 m	MPC · JPL
868167	2016 BE_{144}	—	October 28, 2014	Mount Lemmon	Mount Lemmon Survey	·	2.0 km	MPC · JPL
868168	2016 BU_{145}	—	January 18, 2016	Mount Lemmon	Mount Lemmon Survey	L5	6.1 km	MPC · JPL
868169	2016 BZ_{145}	—	October 28, 2014	Mount Lemmon	Mount Lemmon Survey	·	620 m	MPC · JPL
868170	2016 BN_{147}	—	January 28, 2016	Mount Lemmon	Mount Lemmon Survey	·	860 m	MPC · JPL
868171	2016 CC	—	January 4, 2016	Haleakala	Pan-STARRS 1	·	350 m	MPC · JPL
868172	2016 CE_{1}	—	January 30, 2016	Mount Lemmon	Mount Lemmon Survey	·	2.1 km	MPC · JPL
868173	2016 CV_{1}	—	August 6, 2008	La Sagra	OAM	·	2.6 km	MPC · JPL
868174	2016 CA_{3}	—	March 16, 2009	Kitt Peak	Spacewatch	·	700 m	MPC · JPL
868175	2016 CH_{3}	—	September 2, 2014	Haleakala	Pan-STARRS 1	·	1.6 km	MPC · JPL
868176	2016 CL_{4}	—	February 1, 2016	Haleakala	Pan-STARRS 1	·	920 m	MPC · JPL
868177	2016 CX_{5}	—	August 25, 2014	Haleakala	Pan-STARRS 1	·	2.0 km	MPC · JPL
868178	2016 CH_{8}	—	January 15, 2016	Haleakala	Pan-STARRS 1	MAS	500 m	MPC · JPL
868179	2016 CC_{11}	—	November 9, 2009	Mount Lemmon	Mount Lemmon Survey	·	1.6 km	MPC · JPL
868180	2016 CU_{11}	—	February 4, 2000	Kitt Peak	Spacewatch	·	1.7 km	MPC · JPL
868181	2016 CL_{13}	—	January 8, 2016	Haleakala	Pan-STARRS 1	·	750 m	MPC · JPL
868182	2016 CT_{13}	—	July 30, 2014	Kitt Peak	Spacewatch	·	720 m	MPC · JPL
868183	2016 CW_{13}	—	February 1, 2016	Haleakala	Pan-STARRS 1	·	1.3 km	MPC · JPL
868184	2016 CC_{14}	—	January 9, 2016	Haleakala	Pan-STARRS 1	·	470 m	MPC · JPL
868185	2016 CM_{14}	—	February 26, 2011	Mount Lemmon	Mount Lemmon Survey	·	1.2 km	MPC · JPL
868186	2016 CK_{15}	—	February 1, 2016	Haleakala	Pan-STARRS 1	MAS	540 m	MPC · JPL
868187	2016 CZ_{17}	—	August 30, 2014	Haleakala	Pan-STARRS 1	·	2.1 km	MPC · JPL
868188	2016 CH_{19}	—	February 1, 2016	Haleakala	Pan-STARRS 1	·	1.3 km	MPC · JPL
868189	2016 CK_{20}	—	January 9, 2016	Haleakala	Pan-STARRS 1	·	2.3 km	MPC · JPL
868190	2016 CP_{20}	—	April 3, 2011	Haleakala	Pan-STARRS 1	·	2.0 km	MPC · JPL
868191	2016 CQ_{25}	—	August 8, 2007	Siding Spring	SSS	PHO	680 m	MPC · JPL
868192	2016 CU_{25}	—	September 18, 2014	Haleakala	Pan-STARRS 1	·	2.5 km	MPC · JPL
868193	2016 CZ_{26}	—	October 19, 2011	Mount Lemmon	Mount Lemmon Survey	·	490 m	MPC · JPL
868194	2016 CS_{33}	—	January 19, 1999	Kitt Peak	Spacewatch	·	2.4 km	MPC · JPL
868195	2016 CR_{39}	—	January 19, 2012	Mount Lemmon	Mount Lemmon Survey	·	960 m	MPC · JPL
868196	2016 CB_{41}	—	October 11, 2007	Mount Lemmon	Mount Lemmon Survey	·	790 m	MPC · JPL
868197	2016 CF_{41}	—	August 1, 2014	Roque de los Muchachos	EURONEAR	·	2.0 km	MPC · JPL
868198	2016 CU_{41}	—	February 3, 2016	Haleakala	Pan-STARRS 1	·	790 m	MPC · JPL
868199	2016 CM_{44}	—	January 31, 2009	Kitt Peak	Spacewatch	·	810 m	MPC · JPL
868200	2016 CA_{45}	—	February 3, 2016	Haleakala	Pan-STARRS 1	·	450 m	MPC · JPL

== 868201–868300 ==
back to top

Designation			Discovery			Properties		Ref
Permanent	Provisional	Named after	Date	Site	Discoverer(s)	Category	Diam.	Ref
868201	2016 CG_{45}	—	October 11, 2010	Catalina	CSS	·	1.2 km	MPC · JPL
868202	2016 CT_{51}	—	November 16, 2014	Haleakala	Pan-STARRS 1	·	2.0 km	MPC · JPL
868203	2016 CY_{53}	—	October 2, 2014	Haleakala	Pan-STARRS 1	·	1.5 km	MPC · JPL
868204	2016 CS_{54}	—	February 3, 2016	Haleakala	Pan-STARRS 1	·	550 m	MPC · JPL
868205	2016 CM_{55}	—	February 3, 2016	Haleakala	Pan-STARRS 1	·	1.2 km	MPC · JPL
868206	2016 CT_{55}	—	December 1, 2010	Mount Lemmon	Mount Lemmon Survey	·	1.2 km	MPC · JPL
868207	2016 CT_{57}	—	October 26, 2011	Haleakala	Pan-STARRS 1	·	560 m	MPC · JPL
868208	2016 CP_{58}	—	February 3, 2016	Haleakala	Pan-STARRS 1	·	900 m	MPC · JPL
868209	2016 CD_{59}	—	May 9, 2013	Haleakala	Pan-STARRS 1	V	390 m	MPC · JPL
868210	2016 CX_{67}	—	February 3, 2016	Haleakala	Pan-STARRS 1	·	860 m	MPC · JPL
868211	2016 CX_{68}	—	January 30, 2012	Catalina	CSS	PHO	940 m	MPC · JPL
868212	2016 CA_{71}	—	January 4, 2016	Haleakala	Pan-STARRS 1	JUN	650 m	MPC · JPL
868213	2016 CA_{72}	—	November 23, 2009	Mount Lemmon	Mount Lemmon Survey	·	2.1 km	MPC · JPL
868214	2016 CP_{74}	—	October 15, 2007	Kitt Peak	Spacewatch	·	850 m	MPC · JPL
868215	2016 CT_{74}	—	October 1, 2014	Haleakala	Pan-STARRS 1	·	2.5 km	MPC · JPL
868216	2016 CR_{75}	—	March 26, 2011	Mount Lemmon	Mount Lemmon Survey	·	1.8 km	MPC · JPL
868217	2016 CB_{77}	—	July 25, 2014	Haleakala	Pan-STARRS 1	·	1.1 km	MPC · JPL
868218	2016 CZ_{77}	—	February 5, 2016	Haleakala	Pan-STARRS 1	·	780 m	MPC · JPL
868219	2016 CB_{79}	—	October 26, 2011	Haleakala	Pan-STARRS 1	·	600 m	MPC · JPL
868220	2016 CU_{80}	—	October 25, 2014	Kitt Peak	Spacewatch	·	860 m	MPC · JPL
868221	2016 CN_{81}	—	September 18, 2014	Haleakala	Pan-STARRS 1	·	740 m	MPC · JPL
868222	2016 CG_{86}	—	February 3, 2016	Haleakala	Pan-STARRS 1	·	620 m	MPC · JPL
868223	2016 CU_{86}	—	February 5, 2016	Haleakala	Pan-STARRS 1	·	1.3 km	MPC · JPL
868224	2016 CX_{88}	—	February 5, 2016	Haleakala	Pan-STARRS 1	·	2.5 km	MPC · JPL
868225	2016 CD_{90}	—	October 29, 2014	Haleakala	Pan-STARRS 1	·	2.1 km	MPC · JPL
868226	2016 CR_{92}	—	January 7, 2010	Kitt Peak	Spacewatch	·	2.3 km	MPC · JPL
868227	2016 CO_{93}	—	December 15, 2006	Kitt Peak	Spacewatch	·	1.2 km	MPC · JPL
868228	2016 CP_{93}	—	August 18, 2014	Haleakala	Pan-STARRS 1	·	1.5 km	MPC · JPL
868229	2016 CB_{94}	—	January 7, 2016	Haleakala	Pan-STARRS 1	·	2.2 km	MPC · JPL
868230	2016 CQ_{95}	—	November 20, 2008	Mount Lemmon	Mount Lemmon Survey	·	480 m	MPC · JPL
868231	2016 CM_{96}	—	January 16, 2016	Haleakala	Pan-STARRS 1	·	2.4 km	MPC · JPL
868232	2016 CH_{97}	—	October 20, 2007	Mount Lemmon	Mount Lemmon Survey	·	740 m	MPC · JPL
868233	2016 CZ_{98}	—	January 4, 2016	Haleakala	Pan-STARRS 1	·	670 m	MPC · JPL
868234	2016 CU_{99}	—	October 3, 2014	Mount Lemmon	Mount Lemmon Survey	GEF	870 m	MPC · JPL
868235	2016 CF_{101}	—	February 5, 2016	Haleakala	Pan-STARRS 1	·	550 m	MPC · JPL
868236	2016 CW_{106}	—	November 17, 2014	Mount Lemmon	Mount Lemmon Survey	·	2.1 km	MPC · JPL
868237	2016 CE_{107}	—	August 25, 2014	Haleakala	Pan-STARRS 1	·	1.4 km	MPC · JPL
868238	2016 CJ_{108}	—	January 16, 2016	Haleakala	Pan-STARRS 1	·	820 m	MPC · JPL
868239	2016 CW_{108}	—	February 5, 2016	Haleakala	Pan-STARRS 1	EOS	1.3 km	MPC · JPL
868240	2016 CU_{110}	—	November 28, 2014	Haleakala	Pan-STARRS 1	URS	2.0 km	MPC · JPL
868241	2016 CD_{112}	—	October 25, 2008	Kitt Peak	Spacewatch	·	460 m	MPC · JPL
868242	2016 CT_{113}	—	October 30, 2008	Mount Lemmon	Mount Lemmon Survey	·	2.2 km	MPC · JPL
868243	2016 CE_{115}	—	January 17, 2016	Haleakala	Pan-STARRS 1	·	2.0 km	MPC · JPL
868244	2016 CC_{116}	—	January 14, 2016	Haleakala	Pan-STARRS 1	·	2.3 km	MPC · JPL
868245	2016 CJ_{117}	—	November 27, 2014	Haleakala	Pan-STARRS 1	·	1.7 km	MPC · JPL
868246	2016 CS_{121}	—	August 22, 2014	Haleakala	Pan-STARRS 1	·	1.1 km	MPC · JPL
868247	2016 CW_{122}	—	January 14, 2016	Haleakala	Pan-STARRS 1	·	2.0 km	MPC · JPL
868248	2016 CJ_{123}	—	January 14, 2016	Haleakala	Pan-STARRS 1	·	480 m	MPC · JPL
868249	2016 CK_{123}	—	May 5, 2013	Haleakala	Pan-STARRS 1	·	540 m	MPC · JPL
868250	2016 CO_{123}	—	November 20, 2014	Mount Lemmon	Mount Lemmon Survey	·	2.4 km	MPC · JPL
868251	2016 CR_{123}	—	January 14, 2016	Haleakala	Pan-STARRS 1	·	2.0 km	MPC · JPL
868252	2016 CT_{123}	—	February 28, 2009	Mount Lemmon	Mount Lemmon Survey	·	540 m	MPC · JPL
868253	2016 CO_{124}	—	February 5, 2011	Haleakala	Pan-STARRS 1	·	1.1 km	MPC · JPL
868254	2016 CT_{124}	—	October 4, 2014	Kitt Peak	Spacewatch	·	1.9 km	MPC · JPL
868255	2016 CD_{125}	—	August 21, 2014	Haleakala	Pan-STARRS 1	·	1.2 km	MPC · JPL
868256	2016 CO_{125}	—	October 28, 2014	Mount Lemmon	Mount Lemmon Survey	·	2.0 km	MPC · JPL
868257	2016 CJ_{126}	—	July 1, 2014	Haleakala	Pan-STARRS 1	JUN	660 m	MPC · JPL
868258	2016 CL_{127}	—	September 2, 2013	Mount Lemmon	Mount Lemmon Survey	URS	2.3 km	MPC · JPL
868259	2016 CB_{128}	—	February 5, 2016	Haleakala	Pan-STARRS 1	·	1.4 km	MPC · JPL
868260	2016 CZ_{128}	—	October 25, 2014	Mount Lemmon	Mount Lemmon Survey	·	1.2 km	MPC · JPL
868261	2016 CC_{129}	—	September 4, 2008	Kitt Peak	Spacewatch	·	2.2 km	MPC · JPL
868262	2016 CV_{135}	—	September 18, 2014	Haleakala	Pan-STARRS 1	·	2.2 km	MPC · JPL
868263	2016 CM_{136}	—	February 8, 2016	Mount Lemmon	Mount Lemmon Survey	H	440 m	MPC · JPL
868264	2016 CU_{136}	—	December 4, 2012	Mount Lemmon	Mount Lemmon Survey	H	360 m	MPC · JPL
868265	2016 CY_{140}	—	July 7, 2014	Haleakala	Pan-STARRS 1	·	700 m	MPC · JPL
868266	2016 CE_{141}	—	February 6, 2016	Haleakala	Pan-STARRS 1	·	1.2 km	MPC · JPL
868267	2016 CP_{141}	—	October 15, 2014	Mount Lemmon	Mount Lemmon Survey	·	2.0 km	MPC · JPL
868268	2016 CR_{146}	—	March 2, 2012	Kitt Peak	Spacewatch	·	910 m	MPC · JPL
868269	2016 CK_{150}	—	January 25, 2009	Kitt Peak	Spacewatch	·	490 m	MPC · JPL
868270	2016 CF_{158}	—	February 1, 2016	Haleakala	Pan-STARRS 1	VER	1.9 km	MPC · JPL
868271	2016 CH_{158}	—	August 22, 2014	Haleakala	Pan-STARRS 1	(5)	800 m	MPC · JPL
868272	2016 CN_{161}	—	February 2, 2016	Haleakala	Pan-STARRS 1	·	640 m	MPC · JPL
868273	2016 CZ_{161}	—	February 25, 2011	Mount Lemmon	Mount Lemmon Survey	·	1.3 km	MPC · JPL
868274	2016 CN_{162}	—	January 4, 2016	Haleakala	Pan-STARRS 1	·	620 m	MPC · JPL
868275	2016 CJ_{163}	—	November 9, 2009	Mount Lemmon	Mount Lemmon Survey	·	1.7 km	MPC · JPL
868276	2016 CK_{166}	—	March 5, 2013	Mount Lemmon	Mount Lemmon Survey	·	510 m	MPC · JPL
868277	2016 CO_{167}	—	December 19, 2004	Mount Lemmon	Mount Lemmon Survey	·	2.0 km	MPC · JPL
868278	2016 CF_{168}	—	August 12, 2013	Haleakala	Pan-STARRS 1	·	2.1 km	MPC · JPL
868279	2016 CA_{173}	—	September 24, 2014	Kitt Peak	Spacewatch	THM	1.9 km	MPC · JPL
868280	2016 CY_{173}	—	January 19, 2012	Haleakala	Pan-STARRS 1	·	830 m	MPC · JPL
868281	2016 CZ_{173}	—	November 3, 2011	Mount Lemmon	Mount Lemmon Survey	·	630 m	MPC · JPL
868282	2016 CB_{175}	—	December 16, 2015	Mount Lemmon	Mount Lemmon Survey	·	2.5 km	MPC · JPL
868283	2016 CO_{175}	—	November 26, 2009	Kitt Peak	Spacewatch	·	2.5 km	MPC · JPL
868284	2016 CV_{176}	—	January 12, 2016	Haleakala	Pan-STARRS 1	·	1.8 km	MPC · JPL
868285	2016 CL_{180}	—	October 28, 2014	Haleakala	Pan-STARRS 1	·	2.4 km	MPC · JPL
868286	2016 CV_{181}	—	September 5, 2008	Kitt Peak	Spacewatch	·	2.0 km	MPC · JPL
868287	2016 CZ_{181}	—	September 5, 2008	Kitt Peak	Spacewatch	·	2.1 km	MPC · JPL
868288	2016 CO_{183}	—	January 31, 2016	Mount Lemmon	Mount Lemmon Survey	KON	1.8 km	MPC · JPL
868289	2016 CP_{187}	—	December 13, 2015	Haleakala	Pan-STARRS 1	·	1.2 km	MPC · JPL
868290	2016 CX_{187}	—	November 17, 2014	Mount Lemmon	Mount Lemmon Survey	·	2.1 km	MPC · JPL
868291	2016 CE_{191}	—	August 29, 2014	Mount Lemmon	Mount Lemmon Survey	·	2.0 km	MPC · JPL
868292	2016 CU_{191}	—	March 3, 2006	Kitt Peak	Spacewatch	·	1.3 km	MPC · JPL
868293	2016 CZ_{195}	—	August 28, 2014	Haleakala	Pan-STARRS 1	TIR	2.0 km	MPC · JPL
868294	2016 CB_{196}	—	January 15, 2016	Haleakala	Pan-STARRS 1	·	420 m	MPC · JPL
868295	2016 CD_{197}	—	January 19, 2016	Haleakala	Pan-STARRS 1	·	2.4 km	MPC · JPL
868296	2016 CN_{199}	—	February 9, 2016	Haleakala	Pan-STARRS 1	·	2.0 km	MPC · JPL
868297	2016 CY_{199}	—	February 19, 2009	Kitt Peak	Spacewatch	·	670 m	MPC · JPL
868298	2016 CG_{200}	—	October 1, 2014	Haleakala	Pan-STARRS 1	·	1.9 km	MPC · JPL
868299	2016 CA_{201}	—	January 9, 2016	Haleakala	Pan-STARRS 1	·	970 m	MPC · JPL
868300	2016 CE_{202}	—	October 30, 2011	Mount Lemmon	Mount Lemmon Survey	·	700 m	MPC · JPL

== 868301–868400 ==
back to top

Designation			Discovery			Properties		Ref
Permanent	Provisional	Named after	Date	Site	Discoverer(s)	Category	Diam.	Ref
868301	2016 CM_{203}	—	January 13, 2005	Catalina	CSS	·	1.7 km	MPC · JPL
868302	2016 CK_{204}	—	February 18, 2005	La Silla	A. Boattini, H. Scholl	·	780 m	MPC · JPL
868303	2016 CF_{205}	—	March 21, 2009	Kitt Peak	Spacewatch	·	810 m	MPC · JPL
868304	2016 CF_{206}	—	September 14, 2014	Mount Lemmon	Mount Lemmon Survey	·	720 m	MPC · JPL
868305	2016 CU_{206}	—	December 9, 2015	Haleakala	Pan-STARRS 1	·	2.0 km	MPC · JPL
868306	2016 CZ_{206}	—	January 19, 2012	Kitt Peak	Spacewatch	NYS	930 m	MPC · JPL
868307	2016 CT_{208}	—	December 29, 2011	Kitt Peak	Spacewatch	·	890 m	MPC · JPL
868308	2016 CF_{209}	—	February 9, 2016	Haleakala	Pan-STARRS 1	·	470 m	MPC · JPL
868309	2016 CM_{209}	—	December 28, 2011	Mount Lemmon	Mount Lemmon Survey	MAS	540 m	MPC · JPL
868310	2016 CN_{209}	—	November 17, 2011	Kitt Peak	Spacewatch	·	600 m	MPC · JPL
868311	2016 CX_{209}	—	January 9, 2016	Haleakala	Pan-STARRS 1	·	2.6 km	MPC · JPL
868312	2016 CH_{211}	—	January 14, 2016	Haleakala	Pan-STARRS 1	VER	2.0 km	MPC · JPL
868313	2016 CZ_{213}	—	February 9, 2016	Mount Lemmon	Mount Lemmon Survey	·	1.3 km	MPC · JPL
868314	2016 CZ_{214}	—	February 9, 2016	Haleakala	Pan-STARRS 1	·	970 m	MPC · JPL
868315	2016 CT_{215}	—	February 4, 2016	Haleakala	Pan-STARRS 1	·	1.7 km	MPC · JPL
868316	2016 CL_{217}	—	February 9, 2016	Haleakala	Pan-STARRS 1	PHO	630 m	MPC · JPL
868317	2016 CD_{219}	—	February 9, 2016	Haleakala	Pan-STARRS 1	·	570 m	MPC · JPL
868318	2016 CZ_{220}	—	February 1, 2006	Kitt Peak	Spacewatch	·	440 m	MPC · JPL
868319	2016 CH_{222}	—	August 20, 2014	Haleakala	Pan-STARRS 1	·	2.2 km	MPC · JPL
868320	2016 CJ_{222}	—	February 29, 2012	Mount Lemmon	Mount Lemmon Survey	MIS	1.8 km	MPC · JPL
868321	2016 CM_{222}	—	July 28, 2014	Haleakala	Pan-STARRS 1	H	350 m	MPC · JPL
868322	2016 CF_{224}	—	October 22, 2014	Kitt Peak	Spacewatch	·	2.0 km	MPC · JPL
868323	2016 CZ_{227}	—	November 17, 2014	Haleakala	Pan-STARRS 1	·	1.9 km	MPC · JPL
868324	2016 CV_{228}	—	February 10, 2016	Haleakala	Pan-STARRS 1	·	2.1 km	MPC · JPL
868325	2016 CE_{231}	—	January 20, 2016	Mount Lemmon	Mount Lemmon Survey	H	320 m	MPC · JPL
868326	2016 CV_{231}	—	September 14, 2014	Haleakala	Pan-STARRS 1	·	2.3 km	MPC · JPL
868327	2016 CP_{235}	—	August 25, 2014	Haleakala	Pan-STARRS 1	·	870 m	MPC · JPL
868328	2016 CX_{235}	—	February 6, 2016	Haleakala	Pan-STARRS 1	EOS	1.3 km	MPC · JPL
868329	2016 CV_{236}	—	October 1, 2008	Mount Lemmon	Mount Lemmon Survey	URS	1.9 km	MPC · JPL
868330	2016 CT_{242}	—	November 21, 2003	Kitt Peak	Spacewatch	PHO	580 m	MPC · JPL
868331	2016 CU_{243}	—	October 28, 2014	Mount Lemmon	Mount Lemmon Survey	·	1.9 km	MPC · JPL
868332	2016 CT_{245}	—	October 13, 2006	Kitt Peak	Spacewatch	T_{j} (2.99) · EUP	2.5 km	MPC · JPL
868333	2016 CK_{249}	—	October 19, 2015	Haleakala	Pan-STARRS 1	·	680 m	MPC · JPL
868334	2016 CO_{253}	—	January 31, 2016	Haleakala	Pan-STARRS 1	·	1.9 km	MPC · JPL
868335	2016 CL_{262}	—	December 17, 2015	Haleakala	Pan-STARRS 1	·	1.1 km	MPC · JPL
868336	2016 CB_{264}	—	January 16, 2016	Haleakala	Pan-STARRS 1	PHO	640 m	MPC · JPL
868337	2016 CF_{264}	—	August 30, 2014	Mount Lemmon	Mount Lemmon Survey	LIX	2.6 km	MPC · JPL
868338	2016 CZ_{264}	—	September 14, 2010	Kitt Peak	Spacewatch	·	880 m	MPC · JPL
868339	2016 CN_{265}	—	January 13, 2016	Haleakala	Pan-STARRS 1	H	410 m	MPC · JPL
868340	2016 CO_{265}	—	February 9, 2016	Haleakala	Pan-STARRS 1	H	280 m	MPC · JPL
868341	2016 CU_{265}	—	February 11, 2016	Haleakala	Pan-STARRS 1	H	340 m	MPC · JPL
868342	2016 CZ_{265}	—	February 12, 2016	Haleakala	Pan-STARRS 1	H	320 m	MPC · JPL
868343	2016 CN_{266}	—	February 11, 2016	Haleakala	Pan-STARRS 1	H	280 m	MPC · JPL
868344	2016 CV_{266}	—	February 3, 2016	Haleakala	Pan-STARRS 1	H	340 m	MPC · JPL
868345	2016 CX_{266}	—	October 6, 2012	Haleakala	Pan-STARRS 1	H	390 m	MPC · JPL
868346	2016 CK_{267}	—	September 15, 2004	Kitt Peak	Spacewatch	H	470 m	MPC · JPL
868347	2016 CS_{267}	—	February 3, 2016	Mount Lemmon	Mount Lemmon Survey	H	430 m	MPC · JPL
868348	2016 CX_{267}	—	February 26, 2008	Mount Lemmon	Mount Lemmon Survey	H	280 m	MPC · JPL
868349 Richie	2016 CE_{268}	Richie	February 8, 2016	Tautenburg	Stecklum, B.	H	390 m	MPC · JPL
868350	2016 CS_{268}	—	September 24, 2009	Mount Lemmon	Mount Lemmon Survey	H	290 m	MPC · JPL
868351	2016 CP_{269}	—	January 16, 2016	Haleakala	Pan-STARRS 1	·	2.5 km	MPC · JPL
868352	2016 CG_{270}	—	March 1, 2005	Kitt Peak	Spacewatch	·	2.7 km	MPC · JPL
868353	2016 CK_{270}	—	February 4, 2016	Haleakala	Pan-STARRS 1	·	2.6 km	MPC · JPL
868354	2016 CJ_{273}	—	January 8, 2016	Haleakala	Pan-STARRS 1	·	2.9 km	MPC · JPL
868355	2016 CZ_{275}	—	February 11, 2016	Haleakala	Pan-STARRS 1	·	2.5 km	MPC · JPL
868356	2016 CE_{276}	—	February 11, 2016	Haleakala	Pan-STARRS 1	EOS	1.3 km	MPC · JPL
868357	2016 CY_{276}	—	April 16, 2005	Kitt Peak	Spacewatch	LIX	2.7 km	MPC · JPL
868358	2016 CE_{277}	—	December 12, 1998	Kitt Peak	Spacewatch	·	2.4 km	MPC · JPL
868359	2016 CT_{278}	—	February 9, 2016	Haleakala	Pan-STARRS 1	·	1.9 km	MPC · JPL
868360	2016 CV_{278}	—	February 9, 2016	Haleakala	Pan-STARRS 1	·	740 m	MPC · JPL
868361	2016 CG_{284}	—	February 12, 2016	Mount Lemmon	Mount Lemmon Survey	·	740 m	MPC · JPL
868362	2016 CN_{286}	—	August 11, 2008	Charleston	R. Holmes, H. Devore	·	2.0 km	MPC · JPL
868363	2016 CY_{286}	—	February 4, 2016	Haleakala	Pan-STARRS 1	·	2.2 km	MPC · JPL
868364	2016 CE_{287}	—	November 17, 2014	Mount Lemmon	Mount Lemmon Survey	THM	1.7 km	MPC · JPL
868365	2016 CY_{296}	—	December 10, 2014	Kitt Peak	Spacewatch	·	1.8 km	MPC · JPL
868366	2016 CD_{297}	—	November 6, 2010	Mount Lemmon	Mount Lemmon Survey	EUN	740 m	MPC · JPL
868367	2016 CM_{299}	—	November 17, 2014	Haleakala	Pan-STARRS 1	HYG	1.9 km	MPC · JPL
868368	2016 CJ_{300}	—	February 5, 2016	Haleakala	Pan-STARRS 1	·	2.2 km	MPC · JPL
868369	2016 CQ_{300}	—	October 20, 2014	Mount Lemmon	Mount Lemmon Survey	·	840 m	MPC · JPL
868370	2016 CX_{301}	—	February 5, 2016	Haleakala	Pan-STARRS 1	TIR	2.0 km	MPC · JPL
868371	2016 CQ_{302}	—	February 5, 2016	Haleakala	Pan-STARRS 1	·	740 m	MPC · JPL
868372	2016 CU_{303}	—	December 31, 2011	Kitt Peak	Spacewatch	·	840 m	MPC · JPL
868373	2016 CB_{304}	—	October 28, 2008	Kitt Peak	Spacewatch	·	2.2 km	MPC · JPL
868374	2016 CG_{305}	—	February 5, 2016	Haleakala	Pan-STARRS 1	·	2.1 km	MPC · JPL
868375	2016 CC_{307}	—	December 3, 2005	Mauna Kea	A. Boattini	·	1.4 km	MPC · JPL
868376	2016 CX_{308}	—	November 17, 2014	Haleakala	Pan-STARRS 1	·	1.8 km	MPC · JPL
868377	2016 CE_{311}	—	October 28, 2014	Haleakala	Pan-STARRS 1	HYG	1.9 km	MPC · JPL
868378	2016 CY_{311}	—	October 2, 2014	Mount Lemmon	Mount Lemmon Survey	PHO	580 m	MPC · JPL
868379	2016 CB_{312}	—	February 10, 2016	Haleakala	Pan-STARRS 1	·	1.0 km	MPC · JPL
868380	2016 CD_{312}	—	August 31, 2014	Kitt Peak	Spacewatch	·	610 m	MPC · JPL
868381	2016 CK_{314}	—	December 29, 2014	Haleakala	Pan-STARRS 1	·	2.2 km	MPC · JPL
868382	2016 CD_{316}	—	February 11, 2016	Haleakala	Pan-STARRS 1	·	820 m	MPC · JPL
868383	2016 CT_{317}	—	November 19, 2008	Kitt Peak	Spacewatch	·	2.4 km	MPC · JPL
868384	2016 CS_{318}	—	February 11, 2016	Haleakala	Pan-STARRS 1	ADE	1.5 km	MPC · JPL
868385	2016 CX_{318}	—	December 29, 2014	Haleakala	Pan-STARRS 1	·	2.0 km	MPC · JPL
868386	2016 CF_{319}	—	October 15, 2014	Kitt Peak	Spacewatch	JUN	820 m	MPC · JPL
868387	2016 CY_{321}	—	November 27, 2014	Haleakala	Pan-STARRS 1	·	2.4 km	MPC · JPL
868388	2016 CA_{324}	—	February 15, 2016	Haleakala	Pan-STARRS 1	H	340 m	MPC · JPL
868389	2016 CG_{325}	—	February 11, 2016	Haleakala	Pan-STARRS 1	V	330 m	MPC · JPL
868390	2016 CJ_{325}	—	February 11, 2016	Haleakala	Pan-STARRS 1	·	790 m	MPC · JPL
868391	2016 CC_{326}	—	February 10, 2016	Haleakala	Pan-STARRS 1	·	980 m	MPC · JPL
868392	2016 CY_{326}	—	February 23, 2012	Kitt Peak	Spacewatch	·	880 m	MPC · JPL
868393	2016 CR_{327}	—	February 6, 2016	Haleakala	Pan-STARRS 1	·	490 m	MPC · JPL
868394	2016 CP_{328}	—	February 9, 2016	Haleakala	Pan-STARRS 1	·	430 m	MPC · JPL
868395	2016 CY_{330}	—	February 6, 2016	Haleakala	Pan-STARRS 1	·	2.1 km	MPC · JPL
868396	2016 CO_{331}	—	February 12, 2016	Kitt Peak	Spacewatch	PHO	590 m	MPC · JPL
868397	2016 CC_{333}	—	February 7, 2016	Mount Lemmon	Mount Lemmon Survey	·	2.4 km	MPC · JPL
868398	2016 CK_{333}	—	February 8, 2016	Mount Lemmon	Mount Lemmon Survey	·	2.1 km	MPC · JPL
868399	2016 CM_{333}	—	February 10, 2016	Haleakala	Pan-STARRS 1	·	2.4 km	MPC · JPL
868400	2016 CQ_{333}	—	February 9, 2016	Haleakala	Pan-STARRS 1	·	2.4 km	MPC · JPL

== 868401–868500 ==
back to top

Designation			Discovery			Properties		Ref
Permanent	Provisional	Named after	Date	Site	Discoverer(s)	Category	Diam.	Ref
868401	2016 CD_{334}	—	February 11, 2016	Haleakala	Pan-STARRS 1	EUN	860 m	MPC · JPL
868402	2016 CQ_{335}	—	February 10, 2016	Haleakala	Pan-STARRS 1	·	2.2 km	MPC · JPL
868403	2016 CW_{335}	—	July 14, 2013	Haleakala	Pan-STARRS 1	·	2.1 km	MPC · JPL
868404	2016 CH_{336}	—	February 15, 2016	Mount Lemmon	Mount Lemmon Survey	·	490 m	MPC · JPL
868405	2016 CJ_{336}	—	March 12, 2011	Siding Spring	SSS	EUP	2.9 km	MPC · JPL
868406	2016 CK_{337}	—	February 10, 2016	Haleakala	Pan-STARRS 1	·	2.4 km	MPC · JPL
868407	2016 CL_{337}	—	February 12, 2016	Mount Lemmon	Mount Lemmon Survey	·	2.0 km	MPC · JPL
868408	2016 CP_{337}	—	February 5, 2016	Haleakala	Pan-STARRS 1	(895)	2.5 km	MPC · JPL
868409	2016 CS_{337}	—	February 8, 2016	Mount Lemmon	Mount Lemmon Survey	·	470 m	MPC · JPL
868410	2016 CW_{337}	—	February 3, 2016	Mount Lemmon	Mount Lemmon Survey	·	1.8 km	MPC · JPL
868411	2016 CC_{338}	—	February 11, 2016	Haleakala	Pan-STARRS 1	·	870 m	MPC · JPL
868412	2016 CX_{338}	—	February 9, 2016	Haleakala	Pan-STARRS 1	VER	2.0 km	MPC · JPL
868413	2016 CR_{339}	—	February 3, 2016	Haleakala	Pan-STARRS 1	·	2.3 km	MPC · JPL
868414	2016 CV_{342}	—	February 9, 2016	Haleakala	Pan-STARRS 1	·	2.2 km	MPC · JPL
868415	2016 CF_{343}	—	February 9, 2016	Haleakala	Pan-STARRS 1	·	670 m	MPC · JPL
868416	2016 CP_{343}	—	February 9, 2016	Haleakala	Pan-STARRS 1	·	1.0 km	MPC · JPL
868417	2016 CQ_{343}	—	February 9, 2016	Haleakala	Pan-STARRS 1	·	720 m	MPC · JPL
868418	2016 CA_{344}	—	February 11, 2016	Haleakala	Pan-STARRS 1	V	440 m	MPC · JPL
868419	2016 CV_{345}	—	February 5, 2016	Haleakala	Pan-STARRS 1	·	880 m	MPC · JPL
868420	2016 CP_{346}	—	February 5, 2016	Haleakala	Pan-STARRS 1	MAS	470 m	MPC · JPL
868421	2016 CQ_{346}	—	February 10, 2016	Haleakala	Pan-STARRS 1	V	430 m	MPC · JPL
868422	2016 CG_{348}	—	February 10, 2016	Haleakala	Pan-STARRS 1	·	2.4 km	MPC · JPL
868423	2016 CU_{348}	—	February 5, 2016	Haleakala	Pan-STARRS 1	PHO	650 m	MPC · JPL
868424	2016 CH_{352}	—	February 10, 2016	Haleakala	Pan-STARRS 1	·	650 m	MPC · JPL
868425	2016 CM_{353}	—	November 24, 2011	Mount Lemmon	Mount Lemmon Survey	·	680 m	MPC · JPL
868426	2016 CJ_{356}	—	February 5, 2016	Haleakala	Pan-STARRS 1	L5	6.3 km	MPC · JPL
868427	2016 CT_{356}	—	February 5, 2016	Haleakala	Pan-STARRS 1	BRG	970 m	MPC · JPL
868428	2016 CY_{356}	—	February 12, 2016	Haleakala	Pan-STARRS 1	H	300 m	MPC · JPL
868429	2016 CH_{357}	—	December 6, 2011	Haleakala	Pan-STARRS 1	·	670 m	MPC · JPL
868430	2016 CJ_{360}	—	February 11, 2016	Haleakala	Pan-STARRS 1	·	2.3 km	MPC · JPL
868431	2016 CL_{360}	—	February 5, 2016	Haleakala	Pan-STARRS 1	·	2.1 km	MPC · JPL
868432	2016 CA_{361}	—	February 5, 2016	Haleakala	Pan-STARRS 1	HNS	680 m	MPC · JPL
868433	2016 CT_{361}	—	February 12, 2016	Haleakala	Pan-STARRS 1	·	2.5 km	MPC · JPL
868434	2016 CB_{366}	—	June 16, 2012	Haleakala	Pan-STARRS 1	·	1.8 km	MPC · JPL
868435	2016 CT_{366}	—	February 10, 2016	Haleakala	Pan-STARRS 1	EOS	1.2 km	MPC · JPL
868436	2016 CW_{369}	—	February 5, 2016	Haleakala	Pan-STARRS 1	·	2.2 km	MPC · JPL
868437	2016 CP_{373}	—	February 5, 2016	Haleakala	Pan-STARRS 1	NEM	1.4 km	MPC · JPL
868438	2016 CY_{381}	—	November 9, 2007	Mount Lemmon	Mount Lemmon Survey	·	600 m	MPC · JPL
868439	2016 CQ_{383}	—	February 10, 2016	Haleakala	Pan-STARRS 1	·	2.3 km	MPC · JPL
868440	2016 CX_{384}	—	February 8, 2016	Mount Lemmon	Mount Lemmon Survey	·	870 m	MPC · JPL
868441	2016 CY_{385}	—	February 5, 2016	Haleakala	Pan-STARRS 1	·	2.2 km	MPC · JPL
868442	2016 CX_{388}	—	February 10, 2016	Haleakala	Pan-STARRS 1	PHO	570 m	MPC · JPL
868443	2016 CR_{391}	—	February 1, 2016	Haleakala	Pan-STARRS 1	·	2.4 km	MPC · JPL
868444	2016 CE_{392}	—	November 25, 2014	Haleakala	Pan-STARRS 1	·	2.0 km	MPC · JPL
868445	2016 CN_{392}	—	February 6, 2016	Haleakala	Pan-STARRS 1	·	2.9 km	MPC · JPL
868446	2016 CG_{394}	—	February 5, 2016	Haleakala	Pan-STARRS 1	·	670 m	MPC · JPL
868447	2016 CU_{406}	—	February 9, 2016	Haleakala	Pan-STARRS 1	·	830 m	MPC · JPL
868448	2016 CM_{411}	—	February 10, 2016	Haleakala	Pan-STARRS 1	·	1.5 km	MPC · JPL
868449	2016 CP_{412}	—	June 5, 2013	Mount Lemmon	Mount Lemmon Survey	V	470 m	MPC · JPL
868450	2016 CD_{430}	—	February 10, 2016	Haleakala	Pan-STARRS 1	·	2.5 km	MPC · JPL
868451	2016 DL_{4}	—	October 13, 2014	Mount Lemmon	Mount Lemmon Survey	·	1.9 km	MPC · JPL
868452	2016 DD_{8}	—	December 9, 2015	Haleakala	Pan-STARRS 1	·	910 m	MPC · JPL
868453	2016 DS_{11}	—	September 25, 2008	Mount Lemmon	Mount Lemmon Survey	·	2.3 km	MPC · JPL
868454	2016 DY_{22}	—	November 16, 2009	Mount Lemmon	Mount Lemmon Survey	·	1.3 km	MPC · JPL
868455	2016 DE_{23}	—	May 31, 2011	Mount Lemmon	Mount Lemmon Survey	·	2.2 km	MPC · JPL
868456	2016 DK_{27}	—	April 6, 2008	Mount Lemmon	Mount Lemmon Survey	RAF	580 m	MPC · JPL
868457	2016 DZ_{27}	—	October 18, 2011	Kitt Peak	Spacewatch	PHO	630 m	MPC · JPL
868458	2016 DR_{29}	—	March 23, 2003	Sacramento Peak	SDSS	·	450 m	MPC · JPL
868459	2016 DJ_{31}	—	September 27, 2009	Mount Lemmon	Mount Lemmon Survey	H	320 m	MPC · JPL
868460	2016 DM_{31}	—	February 18, 2016	Mount Lemmon	Mount Lemmon Survey	H	420 m	MPC · JPL
868461	2016 DQ_{31}	—	October 6, 2012	Haleakala	Pan-STARRS 1	H	330 m	MPC · JPL
868462	2016 DR_{31}	—	April 7, 2008	Catalina	CSS	H	430 m	MPC · JPL
868463	2016 DU_{32}	—	May 19, 2012	Mount Lemmon	Mount Lemmon Survey	·	1.3 km	MPC · JPL
868464	2016 DH_{35}	—	March 21, 2012	Mount Lemmon	Mount Lemmon Survey	·	910 m	MPC · JPL
868465	2016 DA_{38}	—	February 27, 2016	Mount Lemmon	Mount Lemmon Survey	·	610 m	MPC · JPL
868466	2016 DC_{38}	—	February 28, 2016	Mount Lemmon	Mount Lemmon Survey	·	1.4 km	MPC · JPL
868467	2016 DH_{40}	—	February 28, 2016	Mount Lemmon	Mount Lemmon Survey	EOS	1.4 km	MPC · JPL
868468	2016 DQ_{42}	—	February 29, 2016	Haleakala	Pan-STARRS 1	·	2.2 km	MPC · JPL
868469	2016 DY_{42}	—	February 27, 2016	Mount Lemmon	Mount Lemmon Survey	PHO	630 m	MPC · JPL
868470	2016 DM_{43}	—	February 16, 2016	Mount Lemmon	Mount Lemmon Survey	·	970 m	MPC · JPL
868471	2016 DW_{43}	—	February 27, 2016	Mount Lemmon	Mount Lemmon Survey	MAS	550 m	MPC · JPL
868472	2016 EL	—	January 10, 2016	Haleakala	Pan-STARRS 1	·	1.0 km	MPC · JPL
868473	2016 EN	—	August 23, 2014	Haleakala	Pan-STARRS 1	H	300 m	MPC · JPL
868474	2016 EO	—	December 13, 2015	Haleakala	Pan-STARRS 1	H	400 m	MPC · JPL
868475	2016 ES	—	March 2, 2016	Haleakala	Pan-STARRS 1	H	370 m	MPC · JPL
868476	2016 ET	—	July 1, 2014	Haleakala	Pan-STARRS 1	H	410 m	MPC · JPL
868477	2016 EX_{1}	—	December 13, 2015	Haleakala	Pan-STARRS 1	H	410 m	MPC · JPL
868478	2016 EP_{2}	—	January 30, 2016	Mount Lemmon	Mount Lemmon Survey	·	1.8 km	MPC · JPL
868479	2016 ET_{2}	—	March 2, 2011	Mount Lemmon	Mount Lemmon Survey	·	1.8 km	MPC · JPL
868480	2016 EZ_{3}	—	April 20, 2012	Mount Lemmon	Mount Lemmon Survey	·	1.4 km	MPC · JPL
868481	2016 EJ_{4}	—	February 11, 2016	Haleakala	Pan-STARRS 1	·	2.5 km	MPC · JPL
868482	2016 EH_{7}	—	November 12, 2015	Mount Lemmon	Mount Lemmon Survey	·	2.1 km	MPC · JPL
868483	2016 ED_{9}	—	January 26, 2012	Mount Lemmon	Mount Lemmon Survey	PHO	620 m	MPC · JPL
868484	2016 ER_{9}	—	November 27, 2014	Haleakala	Pan-STARRS 1	·	2.0 km	MPC · JPL
868485	2016 EE_{14}	—	November 23, 2014	Haleakala	Pan-STARRS 1	·	1.6 km	MPC · JPL
868486	2016 EG_{15}	—	November 29, 2014	Mount Lemmon	Mount Lemmon Survey	·	2.1 km	MPC · JPL
868487	2016 EG_{18}	—	March 3, 2016	Haleakala	Pan-STARRS 1	·	2.3 km	MPC · JPL
868488	2016 EN_{20}	—	March 3, 2016	Haleakala	Pan-STARRS 1	·	2.2 km	MPC · JPL
868489	2016 EE_{26}	—	August 12, 2013	Haleakala	Pan-STARRS 1	PHO	710 m	MPC · JPL
868490	2016 EO_{26}	—	March 3, 2016	Haleakala	Pan-STARRS 1	·	2.2 km	MPC · JPL
868491	2016 ET_{26}	—	June 20, 2013	Mount Lemmon	Mount Lemmon Survey	·	620 m	MPC · JPL
868492	2016 EN_{27}	—	December 9, 2015	Haleakala	Pan-STARRS 1	H	410 m	MPC · JPL
868493	2016 EV_{30}	—	October 3, 2013	Haleakala	Pan-STARRS 1	·	2.3 km	MPC · JPL
868494	2016 EZ_{41}	—	October 9, 2008	Mount Lemmon	Mount Lemmon Survey	·	2.4 km	MPC · JPL
868495	2016 EB_{42}	—	February 5, 2016	Haleakala	Pan-STARRS 1	V	420 m	MPC · JPL
868496	2016 EX_{42}	—	January 8, 2016	Haleakala	Pan-STARRS 1	H	390 m	MPC · JPL
868497	2016 EH_{43}	—	February 6, 2016	Haleakala	Pan-STARRS 1	PHO	620 m	MPC · JPL
868498	2016 ED_{46}	—	April 20, 2010	WISE	WISE	LIX	2.0 km	MPC · JPL
868499	2016 EE_{46}	—	March 4, 2016	Haleakala	Pan-STARRS 1	·	2.3 km	MPC · JPL
868500	2016 ES_{46}	—	October 26, 2014	Haleakala	Pan-STARRS 1	·	2.0 km	MPC · JPL

== 868501–868600 ==
back to top

Designation			Discovery			Properties		Ref
Permanent	Provisional	Named after	Date	Site	Discoverer(s)	Category	Diam.	Ref
868501	2016 EB_{53}	—	October 6, 2012	Mount Lemmon	Mount Lemmon Survey	H	270 m	MPC · JPL
868502	2016 ER_{55}	—	March 2, 2008	Mount Lemmon	Mount Lemmon Survey	H	340 m	MPC · JPL
868503	2016 EU_{59}	—	November 6, 2005	Mount Lemmon	Mount Lemmon Survey	·	570 m	MPC · JPL
868504	2016 ED_{62}	—	March 4, 2016	Haleakala	Pan-STARRS 1	·	1.5 km	MPC · JPL
868505	2016 EH_{62}	—	July 14, 2013	Haleakala	Pan-STARRS 1	HNS	810 m	MPC · JPL
868506	2016 EN_{62}	—	December 20, 2009	Mount Lemmon	Mount Lemmon Survey	·	2.6 km	MPC · JPL
868507	2016 EA_{64}	—	November 11, 2010	Kitt Peak	Spacewatch	PHO	880 m	MPC · JPL
868508	2016 EF_{64}	—	February 14, 2016	Haleakala	Pan-STARRS 1	·	2.3 km	MPC · JPL
868509	2016 EJ_{66}	—	October 24, 2013	Mount Lemmon	Mount Lemmon Survey	EUN	940 m	MPC · JPL
868510	2016 EB_{73}	—	October 9, 2010	Mount Lemmon	Mount Lemmon Survey	·	900 m	MPC · JPL
868511	2016 EE_{73}	—	October 23, 2011	Haleakala	Pan-STARRS 1	·	820 m	MPC · JPL
868512	2016 EC_{75}	—	August 3, 2013	Haleakala	Pan-STARRS 1	ELF	2.3 km	MPC · JPL
868513	2016 EM_{75}	—	September 7, 2008	Mount Lemmon	Mount Lemmon Survey	·	2.1 km	MPC · JPL
868514	2016 EP_{76}	—	March 11, 2005	Mount Lemmon	Mount Lemmon Survey	·	860 m	MPC · JPL
868515	2016 EQ_{76}	—	October 20, 2011	Kitt Peak	Spacewatch	·	540 m	MPC · JPL
868516	2016 EP_{77}	—	February 1, 2005	Kitt Peak	Spacewatch	·	1.9 km	MPC · JPL
868517	2016 ER_{77}	—	January 14, 2016	Haleakala	Pan-STARRS 1	·	1.6 km	MPC · JPL
868518	2016 EU_{77}	—	February 4, 2005	Mount Lemmon	Mount Lemmon Survey	·	810 m	MPC · JPL
868519	2016 EX_{81}	—	November 23, 2014	Haleakala	Pan-STARRS 1	·	2.4 km	MPC · JPL
868520	2016 EV_{82}	—	April 6, 2011	Mount Lemmon	Mount Lemmon Survey	·	2.2 km	MPC · JPL
868521	2016 EN_{83}	—	January 12, 2010	Kitt Peak	Spacewatch	·	2.6 km	MPC · JPL
868522	2016 EX_{84}	—	February 10, 2016	Haleakala	Pan-STARRS 1	·	630 m	MPC · JPL
868523	2016 EU_{88}	—	November 26, 2014	Mount Lemmon	Mount Lemmon Survey	·	2.1 km	MPC · JPL
868524	2016 EW_{89}	—	March 11, 2005	Mount Lemmon	Mount Lemmon Survey	·	830 m	MPC · JPL
868525	2016 EX_{89}	—	March 7, 2016	Haleakala	Pan-STARRS 1	·	2.1 km	MPC · JPL
868526	2016 EA_{90}	—	December 31, 2008	Mount Lemmon	Mount Lemmon Survey	·	470 m	MPC · JPL
868527	2016 ER_{90}	—	October 2, 2008	Kitt Peak	Spacewatch	·	1.8 km	MPC · JPL
868528	2016 EB_{91}	—	February 3, 2016	Haleakala	Pan-STARRS 1	·	580 m	MPC · JPL
868529	2016 ED_{93}	—	May 1, 2006	Mauna Kea	P. A. Wiegert	·	540 m	MPC · JPL
868530	2016 EA_{94}	—	July 14, 2013	Haleakala	Pan-STARRS 1	·	2.6 km	MPC · JPL
868531	2016 EA_{95}	—	October 16, 2014	Mount Lemmon	Mount Lemmon Survey	·	2.2 km	MPC · JPL
868532	2016 EJ_{96}	—	November 16, 2014	Mount Lemmon	Mount Lemmon Survey	·	1.8 km	MPC · JPL
868533	2016 EO_{97}	—	April 13, 2011	Mount Lemmon	Mount Lemmon Survey	·	2.1 km	MPC · JPL
868534	2016 EN_{100}	—	April 9, 2006	Mount Lemmon	Mount Lemmon Survey	·	550 m	MPC · JPL
868535	2016 EF_{107}	—	November 28, 2011	Kitt Peak	Spacewatch	·	630 m	MPC · JPL
868536	2016 EP_{108}	—	January 17, 2005	Kitt Peak	Spacewatch	·	730 m	MPC · JPL
868537	2016 EB_{113}	—	February 5, 2016	Haleakala	Pan-STARRS 1	·	730 m	MPC · JPL
868538	2016 ET_{114}	—	September 4, 2008	Kitt Peak	Spacewatch	·	2.3 km	MPC · JPL
868539	2016 EP_{118}	—	February 5, 2016	Haleakala	Pan-STARRS 1	TIR	2.0 km	MPC · JPL
868540	2016 EN_{122}	—	February 9, 2016	Haleakala	Pan-STARRS 1	·	2.1 km	MPC · JPL
868541	2016 EN_{129}	—	May 21, 2011	Mount Lemmon	Mount Lemmon Survey	·	1.8 km	MPC · JPL
868542	2016 EK_{130}	—	December 14, 2007	Kitt Peak	Spacewatch	MAS	500 m	MPC · JPL
868543	2016 EO_{130}	—	September 4, 2014	Haleakala	Pan-STARRS 1	·	2.5 km	MPC · JPL
868544	2016 ER_{131}	—	February 15, 2010	Kitt Peak	Spacewatch	·	2.0 km	MPC · JPL
868545	2016 EC_{138}	—	February 1, 2012	Mount Lemmon	Mount Lemmon Survey	·	770 m	MPC · JPL
868546	2016 ED_{139}	—	March 2, 2016	Haleakala	Pan-STARRS 1	·	1.1 km	MPC · JPL
868547	2016 EV_{141}	—	November 1, 2007	Mount Lemmon	Mount Lemmon Survey	·	560 m	MPC · JPL
868548	2016 EW_{141}	—	March 10, 2016	Haleakala	Pan-STARRS 1	·	930 m	MPC · JPL
868549	2016 EN_{142}	—	March 10, 2016	Haleakala	Pan-STARRS 1	·	1.3 km	MPC · JPL
868550	2016 EE_{143}	—	January 29, 2012	Mayhill-ISON	L. Elenin	·	840 m	MPC · JPL
868551	2016 EX_{148}	—	March 6, 2016	Haleakala	Pan-STARRS 1	PHO	660 m	MPC · JPL
868552	2016 EP_{152}	—	March 10, 2016	Haleakala	Pan-STARRS 1	·	460 m	MPC · JPL
868553	2016 EH_{153}	—	February 10, 2016	Haleakala	Pan-STARRS 1	·	760 m	MPC · JPL
868554	2016 EV_{157}	—	March 11, 2016	Haleakala	Pan-STARRS 1	H	310 m	MPC · JPL
868555	2016 EP_{162}	—	February 10, 2016	Haleakala	Pan-STARRS 1	·	670 m	MPC · JPL
868556	2016 EF_{164}	—	January 8, 2016	Haleakala	Pan-STARRS 1	ERI	970 m	MPC · JPL
868557	2016 EK_{164}	—	March 11, 2016	Haleakala	Pan-STARRS 1	PHO	720 m	MPC · JPL
868558	2016 EL_{164}	—	February 10, 2016	Haleakala	Pan-STARRS 1	·	750 m	MPC · JPL
868559	2016 EP_{168}	—	March 11, 2016	Haleakala	Pan-STARRS 1	·	510 m	MPC · JPL
868560	2016 EF_{169}	—	April 18, 2009	Kitt Peak	Spacewatch	NYS	600 m	MPC · JPL
868561	2016 EX_{170}	—	March 3, 2009	Kitt Peak	Spacewatch	·	560 m	MPC · JPL
868562	2016 EF_{171}	—	August 28, 2006	Kitt Peak	Spacewatch	NYS	720 m	MPC · JPL
868563	2016 EC_{173}	—	May 15, 2012	Haleakala	Pan-STARRS 1	ADE	1.6 km	MPC · JPL
868564	2016 EM_{174}	—	March 26, 2011	Mount Lemmon	Mount Lemmon Survey	·	1.5 km	MPC · JPL
868565	2016 EC_{175}	—	December 13, 2015	Haleakala	Pan-STARRS 1	·	860 m	MPC · JPL
868566	2016 EP_{177}	—	September 26, 2006	Kitt Peak	Spacewatch	·	810 m	MPC · JPL
868567	2016 EY_{179}	—	March 12, 2016	Haleakala	Pan-STARRS 1	·	2.6 km	MPC · JPL
868568	2016 EE_{180}	—	March 12, 2016	Haleakala	Pan-STARRS 1	EOS	1.4 km	MPC · JPL
868569	2016 EB_{182}	—	August 25, 2014	Haleakala	Pan-STARRS 1	H	380 m	MPC · JPL
868570	2016 EF_{183}	—	March 12, 2016	Haleakala	Pan-STARRS 1	·	900 m	MPC · JPL
868571	2016 EU_{183}	—	March 12, 2016	Haleakala	Pan-STARRS 1	·	2.0 km	MPC · JPL
868572	2016 ET_{185}	—	January 26, 2012	Haleakala	Pan-STARRS 1	MAS	530 m	MPC · JPL
868573	2016 EH_{186}	—	January 16, 2016	Haleakala	Pan-STARRS 1	·	1.9 km	MPC · JPL
868574	2016 EL_{192}	—	February 10, 2016	Haleakala	Pan-STARRS 1	·	2.1 km	MPC · JPL
868575	2016 EF_{193}	—	September 18, 2007	Kitt Peak	Spacewatch	·	530 m	MPC · JPL
868576	2016 ER_{193}	—	September 19, 2014	Haleakala	Pan-STARRS 1	·	2.0 km	MPC · JPL
868577	2016 EE_{194}	—	February 10, 2016	Haleakala	Pan-STARRS 1	·	2.3 km	MPC · JPL
868578	2016 EU_{203}	—	September 26, 2012	Haleakala	Pan-STARRS 1	H	300 m	MPC · JPL
868579	2016 EV_{203}	—	April 2, 2011	Kitt Peak	Spacewatch	H	310 m	MPC · JPL
868580	2016 EZ_{203}	—	December 3, 2012	Mount Lemmon	Mount Lemmon Survey	H	380 m	MPC · JPL
868581	2016 EF_{205}	—	March 3, 2016	Haleakala	Pan-STARRS 1	H	390 m	MPC · JPL
868582	2016 EO_{205}	—	March 4, 2016	Haleakala	Pan-STARRS 1	H	340 m	MPC · JPL
868583	2016 EM_{206}	—	October 9, 2012	Mount Lemmon	Mount Lemmon Survey	H	250 m	MPC · JPL
868584	2016 EP_{206}	—	March 4, 2016	Haleakala	Pan-STARRS 1	H	420 m	MPC · JPL
868585	2016 ET_{206}	—	March 6, 2016	Haleakala	Pan-STARRS 1	H	360 m	MPC · JPL
868586	2016 EF_{207}	—	March 12, 2016	Haleakala	Pan-STARRS 1	H	300 m	MPC · JPL
868587	2016 EU_{207}	—	March 2, 2016	Haleakala	Pan-STARRS 1	·	1.5 km	MPC · JPL
868588	2016 ED_{209}	—	March 4, 2016	Haleakala	Pan-STARRS 1	·	2.0 km	MPC · JPL
868589	2016 EW_{209}	—	March 5, 2016	Haleakala	Pan-STARRS 1	TIR	1.9 km	MPC · JPL
868590	2016 EC_{210}	—	December 27, 2014	Mount Lemmon	Mount Lemmon Survey	·	2.3 km	MPC · JPL
868591	2016 EQ_{213}	—	March 12, 2016	Haleakala	Pan-STARRS 1	PHO	530 m	MPC · JPL
868592	2016 ES_{213}	—	March 12, 2016	Haleakala	Pan-STARRS 1	HYG	1.9 km	MPC · JPL
868593	2016 EW_{215}	—	March 7, 2016	Haleakala	Pan-STARRS 1	·	890 m	MPC · JPL
868594	2016 EC_{218}	—	September 1, 2013	Haleakala	Pan-STARRS 1	AST	1.3 km	MPC · JPL
868595	2016 EF_{221}	—	September 13, 2007	Mount Lemmon	Mount Lemmon Survey	·	490 m	MPC · JPL
868596	2016 EH_{221}	—	September 5, 2007	Mount Lemmon	Mount Lemmon Survey	EOS	1.3 km	MPC · JPL
868597	2016 EF_{222}	—	February 27, 2012	Haleakala	Pan-STARRS 1	·	810 m	MPC · JPL
868598	2016 EG_{224}	—	December 19, 2009	Mount Lemmon	Mount Lemmon Survey	·	1.7 km	MPC · JPL
868599	2016 EL_{224}	—	December 26, 2014	Haleakala	Pan-STARRS 1	·	1.7 km	MPC · JPL
868600	2016 EY_{224}	—	October 8, 2008	Mount Lemmon	Mount Lemmon Survey	·	1.9 km	MPC · JPL

== 868601–868700 ==
back to top

Designation			Discovery			Properties		Ref
Permanent	Provisional	Named after	Date	Site	Discoverer(s)	Category	Diam.	Ref
868601	2016 EZ_{225}	—	March 10, 2016	Haleakala	Pan-STARRS 1	·	800 m	MPC · JPL
868602	2016 EW_{227}	—	November 24, 2003	Kitt Peak	Spacewatch	·	2.3 km	MPC · JPL
868603	2016 EF_{230}	—	September 16, 2009	Kitt Peak	Spacewatch	(194)	1.3 km	MPC · JPL
868604	2016 EA_{232}	—	March 3, 2016	Mount Lemmon	Mount Lemmon Survey	·	1.3 km	MPC · JPL
868605	2016 EW_{232}	—	January 19, 2012	Haleakala	Pan-STARRS 1	NYS	740 m	MPC · JPL
868606	2016 ET_{242}	—	September 24, 2008	Kitt Peak	Spacewatch	·	2.0 km	MPC · JPL
868607	2016 EY_{242}	—	April 3, 2011	Haleakala	Pan-STARRS 1	·	1.4 km	MPC · JPL
868608	2016 EC_{246}	—	February 15, 2012	Haleakala	Pan-STARRS 1	V	440 m	MPC · JPL
868609	2016 EB_{248}	—	January 31, 2004	Sacramento Peak	SDSS	T_{j} (2.99)	2.3 km	MPC · JPL
868610	2016 EE_{248}	—	March 13, 2016	Haleakala	Pan-STARRS 1	PHO	710 m	MPC · JPL
868611	2016 EB_{250}	—	March 11, 2016	Haleakala	Pan-STARRS 1	H	380 m	MPC · JPL
868612	2016 EM_{250}	—	March 7, 2016	Haleakala	Pan-STARRS 1	·	1.1 km	MPC · JPL
868613	2016 ES_{250}	—	July 25, 2011	Haleakala	Pan-STARRS 1	THB	2.1 km	MPC · JPL
868614	2016 EO_{253}	—	March 4, 2016	Haleakala	Pan-STARRS 1	H	250 m	MPC · JPL
868615	2016 EZ_{253}	—	March 2, 2016	Haleakala	Pan-STARRS 1	H	320 m	MPC · JPL
868616	2016 EP_{254}	—	March 2, 2016	Haleakala	Pan-STARRS 1	·	1.0 km	MPC · JPL
868617	2016 EC_{255}	—	March 10, 2016	Haleakala	Pan-STARRS 1	·	550 m	MPC · JPL
868618	2016 EF_{255}	—	March 5, 2016	Haleakala	Pan-STARRS 1	·	960 m	MPC · JPL
868619	2016 EA_{258}	—	March 2, 2016	Mount Lemmon	Mount Lemmon Survey	·	2.2 km	MPC · JPL
868620	2016 EF_{258}	—	March 5, 2016	Haleakala	Pan-STARRS 1	·	2.6 km	MPC · JPL
868621	2016 EM_{258}	—	March 7, 2016	Haleakala	Pan-STARRS 1	·	2.0 km	MPC · JPL
868622	2016 EP_{260}	—	March 3, 2016	Mount Lemmon	Mount Lemmon Survey	·	3.1 km	MPC · JPL
868623	2016 EZ_{260}	—	March 4, 2016	Haleakala	Pan-STARRS 1	AGN	760 m	MPC · JPL
868624	2016 EU_{261}	—	March 10, 2016	Haleakala	Pan-STARRS 1	MAS	490 m	MPC · JPL
868625	2016 EB_{263}	—	March 11, 2016	Mount Lemmon	Mount Lemmon Survey	·	2.5 km	MPC · JPL
868626	2016 EW_{263}	—	March 10, 2016	Haleakala	Pan-STARRS 1	·	460 m	MPC · JPL
868627	2016 EX_{263}	—	March 7, 2016	Haleakala	Pan-STARRS 1	·	2.2 km	MPC · JPL
868628	2016 EO_{264}	—	March 13, 2016	Haleakala	Pan-STARRS 1	·	2.0 km	MPC · JPL
868629	2016 EQ_{264}	—	August 24, 2001	Kitt Peak	Spacewatch	EOS	1.5 km	MPC · JPL
868630	2016 ER_{264}	—	March 4, 2016	Haleakala	Pan-STARRS 1	·	940 m	MPC · JPL
868631	2016 EN_{265}	—	March 6, 2016	Haleakala	Pan-STARRS 1	·	1.2 km	MPC · JPL
868632	2016 ES_{266}	—	March 7, 2016	Haleakala	Pan-STARRS 1	·	850 m	MPC · JPL
868633	2016 EP_{267}	—	March 4, 2016	Haleakala	Pan-STARRS 1	·	470 m	MPC · JPL
868634	2016 EL_{268}	—	March 6, 2016	Haleakala	Pan-STARRS 1	·	2.7 km	MPC · JPL
868635	2016 EX_{268}	—	March 13, 2016	Haleakala	Pan-STARRS 1	·	540 m	MPC · JPL
868636	2016 EF_{269}	—	March 10, 2016	Haleakala	Pan-STARRS 1	·	670 m	MPC · JPL
868637	2016 EU_{270}	—	March 6, 2016	Haleakala	Pan-STARRS 1	·	850 m	MPC · JPL
868638	2016 EQ_{272}	—	March 1, 2016	Mount Lemmon	Mount Lemmon Survey	·	850 m	MPC · JPL
868639	2016 EJ_{274}	—	March 10, 2016	Haleakala	Pan-STARRS 1	·	430 m	MPC · JPL
868640	2016 EV_{275}	—	March 2, 2016	Mount Lemmon	Mount Lemmon Survey	·	1.8 km	MPC · JPL
868641	2016 EA_{276}	—	March 7, 2016	Haleakala	Pan-STARRS 1	·	2.3 km	MPC · JPL
868642	2016 ER_{279}	—	March 7, 2016	Haleakala	Pan-STARRS 1	·	1.2 km	MPC · JPL
868643	2016 ES_{281}	—	March 12, 2016	Haleakala	Pan-STARRS 1	·	2.2 km	MPC · JPL
868644	2016 EV_{281}	—	March 12, 2016	Haleakala	Pan-STARRS 1	·	1.7 km	MPC · JPL
868645	2016 EN_{282}	—	March 6, 2016	Haleakala	Pan-STARRS 1	H	350 m	MPC · JPL
868646	2016 EV_{282}	—	March 10, 2016	Haleakala	Pan-STARRS 1	EUN	770 m	MPC · JPL
868647	2016 EZ_{282}	—	March 6, 2016	Haleakala	Pan-STARRS 1	·	750 m	MPC · JPL
868648	2016 ET_{283}	—	March 6, 2016	Haleakala	Pan-STARRS 1	(895)	2.3 km	MPC · JPL
868649	2016 EL_{286}	—	October 26, 2013	Mount Lemmon	Mount Lemmon Survey	·	2.2 km	MPC · JPL
868650	2016 EV_{288}	—	March 13, 2016	Haleakala	Pan-STARRS 1	·	680 m	MPC · JPL
868651	2016 EZ_{292}	—	March 12, 2016	Haleakala	Pan-STARRS 1	·	1.2 km	MPC · JPL
868652	2016 ED_{293}	—	March 1, 2016	Mount Lemmon	Mount Lemmon Survey	KOR	950 m	MPC · JPL
868653	2016 ES_{295}	—	March 14, 2016	Mount Lemmon	Mount Lemmon Survey	·	1.3 km	MPC · JPL
868654	2016 EJ_{296}	—	March 12, 2016	Haleakala	Pan-STARRS 1	DOR	1.8 km	MPC · JPL
868655	2016 EW_{296}	—	March 3, 2016	Haleakala	Pan-STARRS 1	T_{j} (2.98)	2.7 km	MPC · JPL
868656	2016 EU_{297}	—	March 13, 2016	Haleakala	Pan-STARRS 1	·	1.6 km	MPC · JPL
868657	2016 EC_{298}	—	March 1, 2016	Mount Lemmon	Mount Lemmon Survey	·	2.1 km	MPC · JPL
868658	2016 ET_{301}	—	March 3, 2016	Haleakala	Pan-STARRS 1	·	2.1 km	MPC · JPL
868659	2016 EA_{304}	—	February 1, 2012	Kitt Peak	Spacewatch	·	800 m	MPC · JPL
868660	2016 EV_{305}	—	March 10, 2016	Haleakala	Pan-STARRS 1	VER	1.7 km	MPC · JPL
868661	2016 EW_{306}	—	March 13, 2016	Haleakala	Pan-STARRS 1	·	1.6 km	MPC · JPL
868662	2016 EY_{306}	—	May 9, 2011	Mount Lemmon	Mount Lemmon Survey	·	2.7 km	MPC · JPL
868663	2016 EM_{307}	—	March 7, 2016	Haleakala	Pan-STARRS 1	·	920 m	MPC · JPL
868664	2016 EQ_{307}	—	March 6, 2016	Haleakala	Pan-STARRS 1	·	830 m	MPC · JPL
868665	2016 ER_{313}	—	March 13, 2016	Haleakala	Pan-STARRS 1	H	330 m	MPC · JPL
868666	2016 EF_{314}	—	March 3, 2016	Haleakala	Pan-STARRS 1	·	540 m	MPC · JPL
868667	2016 EE_{315}	—	March 3, 2016	Mount Lemmon	Mount Lemmon Survey	EUN	780 m	MPC · JPL
868668	2016 EU_{316}	—	August 27, 2012	Haleakala	Pan-STARRS 1	·	2.7 km	MPC · JPL
868669	2016 EB_{317}	—	March 12, 2016	Haleakala	Pan-STARRS 1	·	450 m	MPC · JPL
868670	2016 EL_{317}	—	March 12, 2016	Haleakala	Pan-STARRS 1	EOS	1.4 km	MPC · JPL
868671	2016 EA_{321}	—	March 13, 2016	Haleakala	Pan-STARRS 1	·	1.3 km	MPC · JPL
868672	2016 EQ_{321}	—	March 5, 2016	Haleakala	Pan-STARRS 1	H	280 m	MPC · JPL
868673	2016 EX_{321}	—	March 3, 2016	Mount Lemmon	Mount Lemmon Survey	·	2.7 km	MPC · JPL
868674	2016 ET_{324}	—	November 8, 2013	Kitt Peak	Spacewatch	SYL	2.7 km	MPC · JPL
868675	2016 EK_{328}	—	March 12, 2016	Haleakala	Pan-STARRS 1	V	440 m	MPC · JPL
868676	2016 EL_{352}	—	March 6, 2016	Haleakala	Pan-STARRS 1	·	1.9 km	MPC · JPL
868677	2016 EF_{361}	—	March 3, 2016	Mount Lemmon	Mount Lemmon Survey	·	910 m	MPC · JPL
868678	2016 EF_{363}	—	March 10, 2016	Haleakala	Pan-STARRS 1	·	920 m	MPC · JPL
868679	2016 EB_{373}	—	August 11, 2018	Haleakala	Pan-STARRS 1	·	860 m	MPC · JPL
868680	2016 ED_{375}	—	March 2, 2016	Mount Lemmon	Mount Lemmon Survey	·	2.0 km	MPC · JPL
868681	2016 EA_{377}	—	June 6, 2016	Mauna Kea	COIAS	PHO	540 m	MPC · JPL
868682	2016 EE_{385}	—	November 12, 2005	Kitt Peak	Spacewatch	·	1.1 km	MPC · JPL
868683	2016 EN_{395}	—	March 12, 2016	Haleakala	Pan-STARRS 1	·	730 m	MPC · JPL
868684	2016 EB_{397}	—	March 9, 2016	Mauna Kea	COIAS	·	1.5 km	MPC · JPL
868685	2016 FH	—	March 16, 2016	Mount Lemmon	Mount Lemmon Survey	H	410 m	MPC · JPL
868686	2016 FP_{4}	—	February 23, 1998	Kitt Peak	Spacewatch	·	720 m	MPC · JPL
868687	2016 FC_{8}	—	March 9, 2016	ESA OGS	ESA OGS	·	2.0 km	MPC · JPL
868688	2016 FA_{11}	—	March 2, 2009	Kitt Peak	Spacewatch	·	550 m	MPC · JPL
868689	2016 FM_{12}	—	April 26, 2011	Mount Lemmon	Mount Lemmon Survey	H	350 m	MPC · JPL
868690 Fajardo-Acosta	2016 FR_{14}	Fajardo-Acosta	March 28, 2016	WISE	WISE	T_{j} (2.94)	2.4 km	MPC · JPL
868691	2016 FD_{16}	—	January 28, 2011	Catalina	CSS	·	1.5 km	MPC · JPL
868692	2016 FA_{17}	—	February 3, 2016	Haleakala	Pan-STARRS 1	·	910 m	MPC · JPL
868693	2016 FG_{17}	—	March 16, 2009	Kitt Peak	Spacewatch	PHO	710 m	MPC · JPL
868694	2016 FK_{18}	—	February 26, 2008	Mount Lemmon	Mount Lemmon Survey	H	310 m	MPC · JPL
868695	2016 FR_{19}	—	March 13, 2016	Haleakala	Pan-STARRS 1	·	2.1 km	MPC · JPL
868696	2016 FO_{20}	—	September 22, 2012	Mount Lemmon	Mount Lemmon Survey	·	2.2 km	MPC · JPL
868697	2016 FF_{23}	—	March 10, 2016	Haleakala	Pan-STARRS 1	·	1.1 km	MPC · JPL
868698	2016 FK_{25}	—	March 12, 2005	Kitt Peak	Spacewatch	·	850 m	MPC · JPL
868699	2016 FV_{31}	—	March 12, 2016	Haleakala	Pan-STARRS 1	·	1.5 km	MPC · JPL
868700	2016 FJ_{35}	—	April 29, 2009	Kitt Peak	Spacewatch	·	650 m	MPC · JPL

== 868701–868800 ==
back to top

Designation			Discovery			Properties		Ref
Permanent	Provisional	Named after	Date	Site	Discoverer(s)	Category	Diam.	Ref
868701	2016 FZ_{38}	—	March 15, 2016	Haleakala	Pan-STARRS 1	·	1.6 km	MPC · JPL
868702	2016 FZ_{42}	—	April 22, 2009	Mount Lemmon	Mount Lemmon Survey	MAS	490 m	MPC · JPL
868703	2016 FJ_{44}	—	March 17, 2005	Mount Lemmon	Mount Lemmon Survey	·	800 m	MPC · JPL
868704	2016 FF_{46}	—	November 13, 2007	Mount Lemmon	Mount Lemmon Survey	ERI	920 m	MPC · JPL
868705	2016 FH_{47}	—	February 11, 2016	Haleakala	Pan-STARRS 1	TIR	2.0 km	MPC · JPL
868706	2016 FL_{47}	—	March 11, 2016	Haleakala	Pan-STARRS 1	·	780 m	MPC · JPL
868707	2016 FW_{47}	—	October 16, 2007	Mount Lemmon	Mount Lemmon Survey	·	580 m	MPC · JPL
868708	2016 FB_{50}	—	March 4, 2016	Haleakala	Pan-STARRS 1	H	310 m	MPC · JPL
868709	2016 FE_{52}	—	March 31, 2016	Haleakala	Pan-STARRS 1	·	620 m	MPC · JPL
868710	2016 FH_{54}	—	March 12, 2016	Haleakala	Pan-STARRS 1	EUN	700 m	MPC · JPL
868711	2016 FN_{59}	—	March 28, 2016	Cerro Tololo	DECam	SDO	166 km	MPC · JPL
868712	2016 FB_{61}	—	March 17, 2016	Haleakala	Pan-STARRS 1	H	340 m	MPC · JPL
868713	2016 FG_{61}	—	April 15, 2008	Mount Lemmon	Mount Lemmon Survey	H	290 m	MPC · JPL
868714	2016 FL_{61}	—	March 16, 2016	Mount Lemmon	Mount Lemmon Survey	H	340 m	MPC · JPL
868715	2016 FS_{61}	—	March 19, 2016	Haleakala	Pan-STARRS 1	H	380 m	MPC · JPL
868716	2016 FP_{64}	—	March 17, 2016	Haleakala	Pan-STARRS 1	·	1.2 km	MPC · JPL
868717	2016 FY_{67}	—	March 13, 2016	Haleakala	Pan-STARRS 1	·	2.2 km	MPC · JPL
868718	2016 FN_{69}	—	February 13, 2008	Kitt Peak	Spacewatch	NYS	830 m	MPC · JPL
868719	2016 FK_{70}	—	April 9, 2003	Palomar	NEAT	·	500 m	MPC · JPL
868720	2016 FU_{71}	—	March 27, 2016	Mount Lemmon	Mount Lemmon Survey	V	450 m	MPC · JPL
868721	2016 FZ_{72}	—	March 28, 2016	Mount Lemmon	Mount Lemmon Survey	·	470 m	MPC · JPL
868722	2016 FD_{73}	—	March 28, 2016	Mount Lemmon	Mount Lemmon Survey	·	860 m	MPC · JPL
868723	2016 FU_{73}	—	March 17, 2016	Mount Lemmon	Mount Lemmon Survey	·	470 m	MPC · JPL
868724	2016 FH_{74}	—	March 16, 2016	Haleakala	Pan-STARRS 1	·	910 m	MPC · JPL
868725	2016 FK_{74}	—	March 17, 2016	Haleakala	Pan-STARRS 1	·	790 m	MPC · JPL
868726	2016 FZ_{74}	—	March 18, 2016	Mount Lemmon	Mount Lemmon Survey	·	2.2 km	MPC · JPL
868727	2016 FL_{75}	—	March 17, 2016	Mount Lemmon	Mount Lemmon Survey	·	800 m	MPC · JPL
868728	2016 FQ_{77}	—	March 16, 2016	Haleakala	Pan-STARRS 1	·	1.7 km	MPC · JPL
868729	2016 FQ_{79}	—	March 17, 2016	Mount Lemmon	Mount Lemmon Survey	·	2.1 km	MPC · JPL
868730	2016 FV_{80}	—	March 31, 2016	Haleakala	Pan-STARRS 1	VER	2.0 km	MPC · JPL
868731	2016 FU_{81}	—	March 27, 2016	Mount Lemmon	Mount Lemmon Survey	·	850 m	MPC · JPL
868732	2016 FS_{82}	—	March 28, 2016	Haleakala	Pan-STARRS 1	·	2.3 km	MPC · JPL
868733	2016 FQ_{83}	—	March 30, 2016	Haleakala	Pan-STARRS 1	H	310 m	MPC · JPL
868734	2016 FZ_{84}	—	October 3, 2013	Mount Lemmon	Mount Lemmon Survey	·	2.3 km	MPC · JPL
868735	2016 FM_{93}	—	March 28, 2016	Cerro Tololo	DECam	·	2.0 km	MPC · JPL
868736	2016 FA_{101}	—	March 16, 2016	Haleakala	Pan-STARRS 1	·	2.0 km	MPC · JPL
868737	2016 FL_{164}	—	March 30, 2016	Haleakala	Pan-STARRS 1	PHO	630 m	MPC · JPL
868738	2016 FW_{166}	—	March 29, 2016	Cerro Tololo-DECam	DECam	·	1.9 km	MPC · JPL
868739	2016 GA	—	September 28, 2009	Kitt Peak	Spacewatch	H	330 m	MPC · JPL
868740	2016 GL_{3}	—	March 7, 2016	Haleakala	Pan-STARRS 1	NYS	660 m	MPC · JPL
868741	2016 GX_{9}	—	April 20, 2006	Kitt Peak	Spacewatch	·	500 m	MPC · JPL
868742	2016 GX_{13}	—	April 1, 2016	Mount Lemmon	Mount Lemmon Survey	·	680 m	MPC · JPL
868743	2016 GZ_{15}	—	September 16, 2014	Mauna Kea	D. J. Tholen	(5)	830 m	MPC · JPL
868744	2016 GY_{22}	—	August 27, 2014	Haleakala	Pan-STARRS 1	H	280 m	MPC · JPL
868745	2016 GT_{24}	—	March 13, 2016	Haleakala	Pan-STARRS 1	·	400 m	MPC · JPL
868746	2016 GZ_{29}	—	October 2, 2013	Mount Lemmon	Mount Lemmon Survey	·	1.8 km	MPC · JPL
868747	2016 GY_{30}	—	October 17, 2010	Mount Lemmon	Mount Lemmon Survey	·	750 m	MPC · JPL
868748	2016 GF_{32}	—	March 24, 2009	Anderson Mesa	Wasserman, L. H.	·	630 m	MPC · JPL
868749	2016 GM_{34}	—	October 9, 2008	Mount Lemmon	Mount Lemmon Survey	LIX	2.3 km	MPC · JPL
868750	2016 GS_{39}	—	December 1, 2003	Kitt Peak	Spacewatch	·	1.6 km	MPC · JPL
868751	2016 GE_{43}	—	November 19, 2008	Kitt Peak	Spacewatch	·	2.0 km	MPC · JPL
868752	2016 GR_{43}	—	April 1, 2016	Haleakala	Pan-STARRS 1	·	750 m	MPC · JPL
868753	2016 GR_{49}	—	March 10, 2016	Mount Lemmon	Mount Lemmon Survey	·	950 m	MPC · JPL
868754	2016 GW_{49}	—	February 3, 2012	Haleakala	Pan-STARRS 1	·	850 m	MPC · JPL
868755	2016 GS_{57}	—	October 8, 2008	Mount Lemmon	Mount Lemmon Survey	·	1.4 km	MPC · JPL
868756	2016 GE_{58}	—	February 10, 2016	Haleakala	Pan-STARRS 1	·	900 m	MPC · JPL
868757	2016 GL_{60}	—	September 6, 2013	Mount Lemmon	Mount Lemmon Survey	·	1.4 km	MPC · JPL
868758	2016 GD_{61}	—	September 23, 2008	Kitt Peak	Spacewatch	·	2.1 km	MPC · JPL
868759	2016 GP_{63}	—	September 4, 2008	Kitt Peak	Spacewatch	·	1.9 km	MPC · JPL
868760	2016 GF_{64}	—	September 14, 2007	Mount Lemmon	Mount Lemmon Survey	·	340 m	MPC · JPL
868761	2016 GB_{66}	—	March 10, 2016	Haleakala	Pan-STARRS 1	MAS	640 m	MPC · JPL
868762	2016 GC_{72}	—	December 10, 2014	Haleakala	Pan-STARRS 1	·	1.7 km	MPC · JPL
868763	2016 GV_{73}	—	January 28, 2011	Mount Lemmon	Mount Lemmon Survey	·	1.3 km	MPC · JPL
868764	2016 GB_{74}	—	October 3, 2013	Mount Lemmon	Mount Lemmon Survey	·	1.8 km	MPC · JPL
868765	2016 GD_{78}	—	December 25, 2014	Haleakala	Pan-STARRS 1	·	2.2 km	MPC · JPL
868766	2016 GP_{84}	—	April 1, 2016	Haleakala	Pan-STARRS 1	·	620 m	MPC · JPL
868767	2016 GB_{89}	—	October 3, 2006	Mount Lemmon	Mount Lemmon Survey	·	910 m	MPC · JPL
868768	2016 GF_{89}	—	April 1, 2016	Haleakala	Pan-STARRS 1	·	1.3 km	MPC · JPL
868769	2016 GO_{90}	—	April 1, 2016	Mount Lemmon	Mount Lemmon Survey	·	460 m	MPC · JPL
868770	2016 GR_{93}	—	April 1, 2016	Haleakala	Pan-STARRS 1	SYL	2.8 km	MPC · JPL
868771	2016 GM_{95}	—	March 6, 2016	Haleakala	Pan-STARRS 1	PHO	750 m	MPC · JPL
868772	2016 GK_{96}	—	April 1, 2016	Haleakala	Pan-STARRS 1	·	1.1 km	MPC · JPL
868773	2016 GZ_{96}	—	November 4, 2013	Mount Lemmon	Mount Lemmon Survey	·	1.4 km	MPC · JPL
868774	2016 GE_{101}	—	April 1, 2016	Haleakala	Pan-STARRS 1	TIR	1.9 km	MPC · JPL
868775	2016 GZ_{104}	—	August 15, 2013	Haleakala	Pan-STARRS 1	NYS	780 m	MPC · JPL
868776	2016 GQ_{105}	—	January 30, 2011	Haleakala	Pan-STARRS 1	·	1.1 km	MPC · JPL
868777	2016 GG_{110}	—	October 23, 2013	Mount Lemmon	Mount Lemmon Survey	·	2.0 km	MPC · JPL
868778	2016 GJ_{112}	—	November 1, 2013	Mount Lemmon	Mount Lemmon Survey	KOR	920 m	MPC · JPL
868779	2016 GC_{113}	—	October 5, 2014	Mount Lemmon	Mount Lemmon Survey	EUN	720 m	MPC · JPL
868780	2016 GU_{116}	—	April 1, 2016	Haleakala	Pan-STARRS 1	·	620 m	MPC · JPL
868781	2016 GO_{118}	—	April 1, 2016	Haleakala	Pan-STARRS 1	HOF	1.6 km	MPC · JPL
868782	2016 GF_{120}	—	September 23, 2014	Cala d'Hort	I. de la Cueva, J. L. Ferrer	·	750 m	MPC · JPL
868783	2016 GA_{121}	—	September 15, 2013	Mount Lemmon	Mount Lemmon Survey	·	2.1 km	MPC · JPL
868784	2016 GC_{129}	—	September 4, 2008	Kitt Peak	Spacewatch	TIR	1.8 km	MPC · JPL
868785	2016 GM_{129}	—	March 10, 2016	Haleakala	Pan-STARRS 1	·	1.5 km	MPC · JPL
868786	2016 GK_{130}	—	November 3, 2010	Mount Lemmon	Mount Lemmon Survey	·	1.0 km	MPC · JPL
868787	2016 GJ_{132}	—	March 4, 2016	Haleakala	Pan-STARRS 1	·	2.5 km	MPC · JPL
868788	2016 GK_{136}	—	March 24, 2003	Kitt Peak	Spacewatch	ADE	1.5 km	MPC · JPL
868789	2016 GG_{139}	—	June 4, 2011	Mount Lemmon	Mount Lemmon Survey	·	2.1 km	MPC · JPL
868790	2016 GN_{145}	—	September 24, 2008	Kitt Peak	Spacewatch	·	1.8 km	MPC · JPL
868791	2016 GO_{146}	—	November 26, 2014	Haleakala	Pan-STARRS 1	·	1.8 km	MPC · JPL
868792	2016 GC_{152}	—	May 23, 2011	Mount Lemmon	Mount Lemmon Survey	·	2.1 km	MPC · JPL
868793	2016 GU_{152}	—	April 3, 2016	Mount Lemmon	Mount Lemmon Survey	·	810 m	MPC · JPL
868794	2016 GQ_{160}	—	June 5, 2005	Kitt Peak	Spacewatch	·	1.9 km	MPC · JPL
868795	2016 GU_{160}	—	December 1, 2008	Kitt Peak	Spacewatch	HYG	2.0 km	MPC · JPL
868796	2016 GP_{166}	—	October 26, 2011	Haleakala	Pan-STARRS 1	·	410 m	MPC · JPL
868797	2016 GL_{167}	—	November 17, 2014	Mount Lemmon	Mount Lemmon Survey	V	450 m	MPC · JPL
868798	2016 GM_{169}	—	February 3, 2012	Haleakala	Pan-STARRS 1	·	740 m	MPC · JPL
868799	2016 GH_{170}	—	April 3, 2016	Haleakala	Pan-STARRS 1	·	560 m	MPC · JPL
868800	2016 GG_{171}	—	March 31, 2016	Haleakala	Pan-STARRS 1	·	860 m	MPC · JPL

== 868801–868900 ==
back to top

Designation			Discovery			Properties		Ref
Permanent	Provisional	Named after	Date	Site	Discoverer(s)	Category	Diam.	Ref
868801	2016 GY_{177}	—	December 18, 2007	Mount Lemmon	Mount Lemmon Survey	·	900 m	MPC · JPL
868802	2016 GD_{179}	—	January 27, 2012	Mount Lemmon	Mount Lemmon Survey	V	370 m	MPC · JPL
868803	2016 GP_{180}	—	April 28, 2012	Mount Lemmon	Mount Lemmon Survey	·	900 m	MPC · JPL
868804	2016 GV_{186}	—	April 3, 2016	Haleakala	Pan-STARRS 1	·	830 m	MPC · JPL
868805	2016 GL_{190}	—	February 3, 2012	Haleakala	Pan-STARRS 1	·	690 m	MPC · JPL
868806	2016 GB_{193}	—	November 9, 2013	Mount Lemmon	Mount Lemmon Survey	·	970 m	MPC · JPL
868807	2016 GR_{197}	—	June 3, 2011	Mount Lemmon	Mount Lemmon Survey	·	1.8 km	MPC · JPL
868808	2016 GR_{200}	—	September 19, 2014	Haleakala	Pan-STARRS 1	H	420 m	MPC · JPL
868809	2016 GK_{207}	—	March 14, 2012	Kitt Peak	Spacewatch	·	980 m	MPC · JPL
868810	2016 GY_{207}	—	March 7, 2016	Haleakala	Pan-STARRS 1	·	700 m	MPC · JPL
868811	2016 GF_{209}	—	April 2, 2016	Haleakala	Pan-STARRS 1	·	510 m	MPC · JPL
868812	2016 GP_{210}	—	March 4, 2016	Haleakala	Pan-STARRS 1	·	1.7 km	MPC · JPL
868813	2016 GT_{215}	—	October 1, 2008	Mount Lemmon	Mount Lemmon Survey	·	840 m	MPC · JPL
868814	2016 GY_{215}	—	March 19, 2016	Haleakala	Pan-STARRS 1	PHO	700 m	MPC · JPL
868815	2016 GF_{217}	—	October 1, 2014	Haleakala	Pan-STARRS 1	PHO	740 m	MPC · JPL
868816	2016 GE_{220}	—	April 11, 2016	Haleakala	Pan-STARRS 1	EOS	1.3 km	MPC · JPL
868817	2016 GL_{220}	—	March 13, 2016	Haleakala	Pan-STARRS 1	H	340 m	MPC · JPL
868818	2016 GE_{222}	—	February 13, 2007	Catalina	CSS	·	1.5 km	MPC · JPL
868819	2016 GO_{223}	—	February 10, 2016	Haleakala	Pan-STARRS 1	·	2.2 km	MPC · JPL
868820	2016 GK_{225}	—	November 17, 2009	Kitt Peak	Spacewatch	·	1.5 km	MPC · JPL
868821	2016 GY_{227}	—	February 4, 2006	Kitt Peak	Spacewatch	·	440 m	MPC · JPL
868822	2016 GM_{230}	—	October 28, 2014	Haleakala	Pan-STARRS 1	·	950 m	MPC · JPL
868823	2016 GA_{231}	—	January 23, 2006	Mount Lemmon	Mount Lemmon Survey	·	490 m	MPC · JPL
868824	2016 GS_{233}	—	January 27, 2011	Mount Lemmon	Mount Lemmon Survey	·	1.1 km	MPC · JPL
868825	2016 GF_{234}	—	March 31, 2003	Sacramento Peak	SDSS	BAR	860 m	MPC · JPL
868826	2016 GX_{240}	—	May 11, 2011	Nogales	M. Schwartz, P. R. Holvorcem	H	440 m	MPC · JPL
868827	2016 GH_{241}	—	August 30, 2014	Mount Lemmon	Mount Lemmon Survey	H	310 m	MPC · JPL
868828	2016 GL_{245}	—	March 4, 2016	Haleakala	Pan-STARRS 1	·	2.1 km	MPC · JPL
868829	2016 GV_{245}	—	March 10, 2005	Mount Lemmon	Mount Lemmon Survey	·	1.9 km	MPC · JPL
868830	2016 GS_{248}	—	March 13, 2016	Haleakala	Pan-STARRS 1	·	480 m	MPC · JPL
868831	2016 GT_{248}	—	February 5, 2016	Haleakala	Pan-STARRS 1	H	360 m	MPC · JPL
868832	2016 GO_{252}	—	May 24, 2011	Mount Lemmon	Mount Lemmon Survey	H	420 m	MPC · JPL
868833	2016 GP_{252}	—	April 28, 2011	Haleakala	Pan-STARRS 1	H	410 m	MPC · JPL
868834	2016 GN_{253}	—	September 23, 2014	Mount Lemmon	Mount Lemmon Survey	H	320 m	MPC · JPL
868835	2016 GB_{254}	—	April 5, 2016	Haleakala	Pan-STARRS 1	H	350 m	MPC · JPL
868836	2016 GJ_{255}	—	April 2, 2016	Haleakala	Pan-STARRS 1	·	2.2 km	MPC · JPL
868837	2016 GG_{256}	—	April 3, 2016	Kitt Peak	Spacewatch	·	2.6 km	MPC · JPL
868838	2016 GU_{258}	—	April 11, 2016	Haleakala	Pan-STARRS 1	·	1.2 km	MPC · JPL
868839	2016 GG_{261}	—	April 1, 2016	Haleakala	Pan-STARRS 1	·	460 m	MPC · JPL
868840	2016 GV_{267}	—	November 10, 2013	Mount Lemmon	Mount Lemmon Survey	·	1.9 km	MPC · JPL
868841	2016 GV_{268}	—	April 10, 2016	Mount Lemmon	Mount Lemmon Survey	H	400 m	MPC · JPL
868842	2016 GA_{269}	—	September 28, 2008	Catalina	CSS	·	1.3 km	MPC · JPL
868843	2016 GX_{269}	—	April 10, 2016	Haleakala	Pan-STARRS 1	·	890 m	MPC · JPL
868844	2016 GK_{270}	—	April 12, 2016	Haleakala	Pan-STARRS 1	·	900 m	MPC · JPL
868845	2016 GS_{270}	—	April 1, 2016	Haleakala	Pan-STARRS 1	H	360 m	MPC · JPL
868846	2016 GM_{271}	—	April 11, 2016	Haleakala	Pan-STARRS 1	·	950 m	MPC · JPL
868847	2016 GA_{274}	—	April 3, 2016	Haleakala	Pan-STARRS 1	·	2.1 km	MPC · JPL
868848	2016 GC_{274}	—	April 12, 2016	Haleakala	Pan-STARRS 1	·	750 m	MPC · JPL
868849	2016 GK_{274}	—	April 12, 2016	Haleakala	Pan-STARRS 1	EUP	2.2 km	MPC · JPL
868850	2016 GG_{277}	—	April 3, 2016	Haleakala	Pan-STARRS 1	·	1.7 km	MPC · JPL
868851	2016 GN_{279}	—	April 5, 2016	Haleakala	Pan-STARRS 1	·	750 m	MPC · JPL
868852	2016 GD_{280}	—	April 2, 2016	Mount Lemmon	Mount Lemmon Survey	·	1.9 km	MPC · JPL
868853	2016 GN_{280}	—	April 5, 2016	Haleakala	Pan-STARRS 1	·	710 m	MPC · JPL
868854	2016 GT_{281}	—	April 14, 2016	Haleakala	Pan-STARRS 1	V	410 m	MPC · JPL
868855	2016 GS_{282}	—	April 10, 2016	Haleakala	Pan-STARRS 1	PHO	640 m	MPC · JPL
868856	2016 GE_{283}	—	April 15, 2016	Haleakala	Pan-STARRS 1	·	960 m	MPC · JPL
868857	2016 GL_{283}	—	April 11, 2016	Haleakala	Pan-STARRS 1	·	2.5 km	MPC · JPL
868858	2016 GS_{283}	—	April 10, 2016	Haleakala	Pan-STARRS 1	·	860 m	MPC · JPL
868859	2016 GL_{284}	—	April 3, 2016	Haleakala	Pan-STARRS 1	·	510 m	MPC · JPL
868860	2016 GK_{286}	—	April 14, 2016	Haleakala	Pan-STARRS 1	PHO	890 m	MPC · JPL
868861	2016 GD_{290}	—	April 1, 2016	Haleakala	Pan-STARRS 1	·	470 m	MPC · JPL
868862	2016 GV_{290}	—	April 11, 2016	Haleakala	Pan-STARRS 1	·	830 m	MPC · JPL
868863	2016 GY_{291}	—	April 1, 2016	Haleakala	Pan-STARRS 1	·	890 m	MPC · JPL
868864	2016 GL_{295}	—	April 11, 2016	Haleakala	Pan-STARRS 1	·	2.0 km	MPC · JPL
868865	2016 GR_{295}	—	April 1, 2016	Haleakala	Pan-STARRS 1	·	560 m	MPC · JPL
868866	2016 GH_{301}	—	April 12, 2016	Haleakala	Pan-STARRS 1	·	560 m	MPC · JPL
868867	2016 GM_{302}	—	January 26, 2015	Haleakala	Pan-STARRS 1	·	2.0 km	MPC · JPL
868868	2016 GY_{302}	—	April 1, 2016	Haleakala	Pan-STARRS 1	AGN	850 m	MPC · JPL
868869	2016 GC_{303}	—	April 3, 2016	Haleakala	Pan-STARRS 1	·	1.7 km	MPC · JPL
868870	2016 GD_{307}	—	April 1, 2016	Haleakala	Pan-STARRS 1	·	1.2 km	MPC · JPL
868871	2016 GS_{307}	—	January 14, 2015	Haleakala	Pan-STARRS 1	MAR	570 m	MPC · JPL
868872	2016 GT_{309}	—	April 5, 2016	Haleakala	Pan-STARRS 1	·	780 m	MPC · JPL
868873	2016 GK_{310}	—	April 12, 2016	Haleakala	Pan-STARRS 1	EUN	660 m	MPC · JPL
868874	2016 GZ_{310}	—	April 3, 2016	Haleakala	Pan-STARRS 1	·	760 m	MPC · JPL
868875	2016 GO_{311}	—	April 5, 2016	Haleakala	Pan-STARRS 1	L4	5.2 km	MPC · JPL
868876	2016 GG_{312}	—	November 28, 2014	Mount Lemmon	Mount Lemmon Survey	·	710 m	MPC · JPL
868877	2016 GC_{313}	—	April 9, 2016	Haleakala	Pan-STARRS 1	·	930 m	MPC · JPL
868878	2016 GH_{313}	—	March 12, 2016	Haleakala	Pan-STARRS 1	PHO	780 m	MPC · JPL
868879	2016 GH_{316}	—	January 28, 2015	Haleakala	Pan-STARRS 1	·	3.4 km	MPC · JPL
868880	2016 GW_{317}	—	April 5, 2016	Haleakala	Pan-STARRS 1	EOS	1.2 km	MPC · JPL
868881	2016 GZ_{317}	—	April 9, 2016	Haleakala	Pan-STARRS 1	·	780 m	MPC · JPL
868882	2016 GR_{319}	—	April 10, 2016	Haleakala	Pan-STARRS 1	H	260 m	MPC · JPL
868883	2016 GC_{321}	—	January 13, 2015	Haleakala	Pan-STARRS 1	·	2.3 km	MPC · JPL
868884	2016 GK_{323}	—	April 5, 2016	Haleakala	Pan-STARRS 1	·	920 m	MPC · JPL
868885	2016 GH_{343}	—	April 5, 2016	Haleakala	Pan-STARRS 1	H	280 m	MPC · JPL
868886	2016 GZ_{349}	—	May 22, 2011	Mount Lemmon	Mount Lemmon Survey	·	2.1 km	MPC · JPL
868887	2016 GV_{357}	—	August 28, 1995	Kitt Peak	Spacewatch	·	2.0 km	MPC · JPL
868888	2016 GF_{364}	—	April 13, 2016	Kitt Peak	Spacewatch	MAR	640 m	MPC · JPL
868889	2016 GU_{371}	—	September 9, 2007	Mount Lemmon	Mount Lemmon Survey	·	420 m	MPC · JPL
868890	2016 GX_{371}	—	April 8, 2016	Mauna Kea	COIAS	·	440 m	MPC · JPL
868891	2016 GX_{382}	—	April 17, 2023	Haleakala	Pan-STARRS 2	·	2.5 km	MPC · JPL
868892	2016 GX_{393}	—	April 11, 2016	Mauna Kea	COIAS	·	1.2 km	MPC · JPL
868893	2016 HM_{1}	—	April 5, 2016	Haleakala	Pan-STARRS 1	·	800 m	MPC · JPL
868894	2016 HM_{2}	—	April 21, 2016	Haleakala	Pan-STARRS 1	AMO	210 m	MPC · JPL
868895	2016 HV_{3}	—	April 27, 2016	Mount Lemmon	Mount Lemmon Survey	APO · PHA	340 m	MPC · JPL
868896	2016 HZ_{3}	—	October 3, 2003	Kitt Peak	Spacewatch	·	710 m	MPC · JPL
868897	2016 HB_{9}	—	April 5, 2016	Haleakala	Pan-STARRS 1	·	2.2 km	MPC · JPL
868898	2016 HC_{9}	—	September 14, 2007	Catalina	CSS	·	720 m	MPC · JPL
868899	2016 HH_{11}	—	January 31, 2016	Haleakala	Pan-STARRS 1	H	390 m	MPC · JPL
868900	2016 HB_{12}	—	April 30, 2016	Haleakala	Pan-STARRS 1	V	480 m	MPC · JPL

== 868901–869000 ==
back to top

Designation			Discovery			Properties		Ref
Permanent	Provisional	Named after	Date	Site	Discoverer(s)	Category	Diam.	Ref
868901	2016 HX_{13}	—	January 8, 2011	Mount Lemmon	Mount Lemmon Survey	·	1.1 km	MPC · JPL
868902	2016 HV_{14}	—	February 10, 2016	Haleakala	Pan-STARRS 1	·	1.6 km	MPC · JPL
868903	2016 HJ_{17}	—	August 28, 2012	Mount Lemmon	Mount Lemmon Survey	TIR	2.2 km	MPC · JPL
868904	2016 HN_{17}	—	November 8, 2010	Mount Lemmon	Mount Lemmon Survey	·	770 m	MPC · JPL
868905	2016 HO_{18}	—	April 30, 2016	Haleakala	Pan-STARRS 1	MAS	630 m	MPC · JPL
868906	2016 HC_{23}	—	February 11, 2016	Haleakala	Pan-STARRS 1	·	1.3 km	MPC · JPL
868907	2016 HF_{26}	—	April 30, 2016	Mount Lemmon	Mount Lemmon Survey	H	380 m	MPC · JPL
868908	2016 HM_{26}	—	April 16, 2016	Haleakala	Pan-STARRS 1	·	1.3 km	MPC · JPL
868909	2016 HZ_{26}	—	April 27, 2016	Haleakala	Pan-STARRS 1	PHO	810 m	MPC · JPL
868910	2016 HG_{27}	—	April 30, 2016	Haleakala	Pan-STARRS 1	·	550 m	MPC · JPL
868911	2016 HZ_{28}	—	April 16, 2016	Haleakala	Pan-STARRS 1	·	820 m	MPC · JPL
868912	2016 HT_{29}	—	July 29, 2008	Kitt Peak	Spacewatch	·	800 m	MPC · JPL
868913	2016 HU_{29}	—	April 29, 2016	Mount Lemmon	Mount Lemmon Survey	·	1.7 km	MPC · JPL
868914	2016 HS_{32}	—	April 30, 2016	Haleakala	Pan-STARRS 1	·	1.5 km	MPC · JPL
868915	2016 HE_{34}	—	April 17, 2016	Mount Lemmon	Mount Lemmon Survey	THB	2.4 km	MPC · JPL
868916	2016 HK_{35}	—	April 30, 2016	Haleakala	Pan-STARRS 1	·	960 m	MPC · JPL
868917	2016 HP_{36}	—	November 17, 2014	Haleakala	Pan-STARRS 1	·	500 m	MPC · JPL
868918	2016 HH_{44}	—	April 17, 2016	Haleakala	Pan-STARRS 1	H	340 m	MPC · JPL
868919	2016 HA_{45}	—	April 30, 2016	Haleakala	Pan-STARRS 1	·	3.0 km	MPC · JPL
868920	2016 HS_{45}	—	April 17, 2016	Mount Lemmon	Mount Lemmon Survey	·	2.3 km	MPC · JPL
868921	2016 HO_{46}	—	April 30, 2016	Haleakala	Pan-STARRS 1	V	350 m	MPC · JPL
868922	2016 JZ_{2}	—	May 2, 2016	Mount Lemmon	Mount Lemmon Survey	·	1.3 km	MPC · JPL
868923	2016 JN_{3}	—	February 4, 2009	Mount Lemmon	Mount Lemmon Survey	·	530 m	MPC · JPL
868924	2016 JL_{4}	—	May 2, 2016	Haleakala	Pan-STARRS 1	·	820 m	MPC · JPL
868925	2016 JM_{5}	—	March 13, 2016	Haleakala	Pan-STARRS 1	H	330 m	MPC · JPL
868926	2016 JE_{9}	—	April 16, 2016	Haleakala	Pan-STARRS 1	·	550 m	MPC · JPL
868927	2016 JQ_{10}	—	May 4, 2016	Haleakala	Pan-STARRS 1	·	800 m	MPC · JPL
868928	2016 JB_{14}	—	May 5, 2016	Mount Lemmon	Mount Lemmon Survey	·	1.0 km	MPC · JPL
868929	2016 JQ_{14}	—	June 11, 2012	Haleakala	Pan-STARRS 1	·	820 m	MPC · JPL
868930	2016 JB_{16}	—	November 17, 2014	Haleakala	Pan-STARRS 1	H	370 m	MPC · JPL
868931	2016 JS_{20}	—	December 29, 2011	Mount Lemmon	Mount Lemmon Survey	·	810 m	MPC · JPL
868932	2016 JL_{22}	—	May 7, 2016	Haleakala	Pan-STARRS 1	·	440 m	MPC · JPL
868933	2016 JB_{24}	—	April 30, 2016	Haleakala	Pan-STARRS 1	·	2.0 km	MPC · JPL
868934	2016 JV_{25}	—	March 19, 2016	Haleakala	Pan-STARRS 1	·	450 m	MPC · JPL
868935	2016 JQ_{27}	—	January 11, 2008	Kitt Peak	Spacewatch	·	920 m	MPC · JPL
868936	2016 JK_{29}	—	November 22, 2014	Mount Lemmon	Mount Lemmon Survey	·	1.9 km	MPC · JPL
868937	2016 JW_{30}	—	March 15, 2007	Catalina	CSS	·	1.2 km	MPC · JPL
868938	2016 JB_{36}	—	May 16, 2009	Kitt Peak	Spacewatch	·	690 m	MPC · JPL
868939	2016 JJ_{39}	—	September 19, 2014	Haleakala	Pan-STARRS 1	H	310 m	MPC · JPL
868940	2016 JP_{39}	—	February 17, 2013	Mount Lemmon	Mount Lemmon Survey	H	380 m	MPC · JPL
868941	2016 JC_{40}	—	May 6, 2016	Haleakala	Pan-STARRS 1	AEG	1.6 km	MPC · JPL
868942	2016 JH_{42}	—	August 21, 2006	Kitt Peak	Spacewatch	·	2.2 km	MPC · JPL
868943	2016 JR_{42}	—	May 6, 2016	Haleakala	Pan-STARRS 1	·	1.3 km	MPC · JPL
868944	2016 JV_{42}	—	May 6, 2016	Haleakala	Pan-STARRS 1	·	1.9 km	MPC · JPL
868945	2016 JB_{44}	—	May 15, 2016	Haleakala	Pan-STARRS 1	·	2.4 km	MPC · JPL
868946	2016 JE_{44}	—	May 4, 2016	Haleakala	Pan-STARRS 1	·	2.0 km	MPC · JPL
868947	2016 JM_{44}	—	May 7, 2016	Haleakala	Pan-STARRS 1	·	2.5 km	MPC · JPL
868948	2016 JJ_{45}	—	May 5, 2016	Haleakala	Pan-STARRS 1	·	1.1 km	MPC · JPL
868949	2016 JO_{45}	—	May 3, 2016	Mount Lemmon	Mount Lemmon Survey	·	970 m	MPC · JPL
868950	2016 JC_{46}	—	May 7, 2016	Haleakala	Pan-STARRS 1	·	680 m	MPC · JPL
868951	2016 JF_{46}	—	May 3, 2016	Mount Lemmon	Mount Lemmon Survey	T_{j} (2.96) · 3:2	4.0 km	MPC · JPL
868952	2016 JH_{46}	—	May 3, 2016	Mount Lemmon	Mount Lemmon Survey	EUN	750 m	MPC · JPL
868953	2016 JP_{46}	—	May 2, 2016	Haleakala	Pan-STARRS 1	·	680 m	MPC · JPL
868954	2016 JW_{46}	—	May 4, 2016	Haleakala	Pan-STARRS 1	EUN	660 m	MPC · JPL
868955	2016 JH_{47}	—	February 4, 2005	Kitt Peak	Spacewatch	·	550 m	MPC · JPL
868956	2016 JM_{52}	—	May 2, 2016	Haleakala	Pan-STARRS 1	·	1.9 km	MPC · JPL
868957	2016 JB_{54}	—	May 3, 2016	Mount Lemmon	Mount Lemmon Survey	·	760 m	MPC · JPL
868958	2016 JU_{55}	—	May 6, 2016	Haleakala	Pan-STARRS 1	·	700 m	MPC · JPL
868959	2016 JY_{61}	—	October 9, 2007	Anderson Mesa	LONEOS	·	1.9 km	MPC · JPL
868960	2016 JL_{64}	—	April 5, 2016	Haleakala	Pan-STARRS 1	·	2.1 km	MPC · JPL
868961	2016 JP_{64}	—	September 15, 2012	Kitt Peak	Spacewatch	·	2.1 km	MPC · JPL
868962	2016 JF_{67}	—	May 5, 2016	Haleakala	Pan-STARRS 1	·	740 m	MPC · JPL
868963	2016 JH_{67}	—	May 13, 2016	Mount Lemmon	Mount Lemmon Survey	H	360 m	MPC · JPL
868964	2016 JL_{70}	—	May 1, 2016	Cerro Tololo	DECam	KOR	860 m	MPC · JPL
868965	2016 JU_{82}	—	May 5, 2016	Haleakala	Pan-STARRS 1	·	2.1 km	MPC · JPL
868966	2016 KW	—	November 26, 2014	Haleakala	Pan-STARRS 1	H	350 m	MPC · JPL
868967	2016 KY_{2}	—	May 3, 2016	Haleakala	Pan-STARRS 1	JUN	760 m	MPC · JPL
868968	2016 KA_{3}	—	October 7, 2012	Haleakala	Pan-STARRS 1	·	1.2 km	MPC · JPL
868969	2016 KN_{3}	—	May 30, 2016	Haleakala	Pan-STARRS 1	·	1.2 km	MPC · JPL
868970	2016 KD_{7}	—	April 23, 2007	Kitt Peak	Spacewatch	·	1.4 km	MPC · JPL
868971	2016 KS_{7}	—	May 3, 2016	Mount Lemmon	Mount Lemmon Survey	·	870 m	MPC · JPL
868972	2016 KL_{10}	—	May 30, 2016	Haleakala	Pan-STARRS 1	H	420 m	MPC · JPL
868973	2016 KV_{10}	—	May 30, 2016	Haleakala	Pan-STARRS 1	·	920 m	MPC · JPL
868974	2016 KC_{11}	—	May 24, 2016	Haleakala	Pan-STARRS 1	H	470 m	MPC · JPL
868975	2016 KT_{11}	—	May 30, 2016	Haleakala	Pan-STARRS 1	·	1.2 km	MPC · JPL
868976	2016 KC_{12}	—	May 30, 2016	Haleakala	Pan-STARRS 1	·	650 m	MPC · JPL
868977	2016 KW_{12}	—	May 30, 2016	Haleakala	Pan-STARRS 1	H	510 m	MPC · JPL
868978	2016 KV_{13}	—	May 30, 2016	Haleakala	Pan-STARRS 1	·	740 m	MPC · JPL
868979	2016 KA_{14}	—	May 30, 2016	Haleakala	Pan-STARRS 1	·	820 m	MPC · JPL
868980	2016 LB_{1}	—	June 3, 2016	Mount Lemmon	Mount Lemmon Survey	·	430 m	MPC · JPL
868981	2016 LK_{1}	—	September 19, 2006	Catalina	CSS	·	600 m	MPC · JPL
868982	2016 LR_{4}	—	September 30, 2011	Kitt Peak	Spacewatch	H	370 m	MPC · JPL
868983	2016 LR_{14}	—	June 5, 2016	Haleakala	Pan-STARRS 1	·	1.0 km	MPC · JPL
868984	2016 LZ_{14}	—	May 4, 2016	Haleakala	Pan-STARRS 1	·	1.9 km	MPC · JPL
868985	2016 LG_{16}	—	April 15, 2016	Haleakala	Pan-STARRS 1	KON	1.4 km	MPC · JPL
868986	2016 LH_{20}	—	May 15, 2016	Haleakala	Pan-STARRS 1	·	850 m	MPC · JPL
868987	2016 LT_{26}	—	May 30, 2016	Haleakala	Pan-STARRS 1	·	750 m	MPC · JPL
868988	2016 LZ_{28}	—	January 14, 2011	Mount Lemmon	Mount Lemmon Survey	·	790 m	MPC · JPL
868989	2016 LN_{30}	—	June 5, 2016	Haleakala	Pan-STARRS 1	BRG	1.0 km	MPC · JPL
868990	2016 LK_{31}	—	June 5, 2016	Haleakala	Pan-STARRS 1	·	1.1 km	MPC · JPL
868991	2016 LT_{34}	—	May 30, 2016	Haleakala	Pan-STARRS 1	·	600 m	MPC · JPL
868992	2016 LA_{35}	—	May 30, 2016	Haleakala	Pan-STARRS 1	(5)	920 m	MPC · JPL
868993	2016 LS_{38}	—	June 5, 2016	Haleakala	Pan-STARRS 1	·	900 m	MPC · JPL
868994	2016 LH_{39}	—	February 13, 2007	Mount Lemmon	Mount Lemmon Survey	·	770 m	MPC · JPL
868995	2016 LH_{42}	—	June 5, 2016	Haleakala	Pan-STARRS 1	EUN	790 m	MPC · JPL
868996	2016 LY_{43}	—	November 30, 2008	Mount Lemmon	Mount Lemmon Survey	JUN	900 m	MPC · JPL
868997	2016 LL_{47}	—	September 3, 2008	Kitt Peak	Spacewatch	·	1.0 km	MPC · JPL
868998	2016 LM_{47}	—	May 2, 2016	Haleakala	Pan-STARRS 1	TIR	2.4 km	MPC · JPL
868999	2016 LZ_{49}	—	February 10, 2016	Haleakala	Pan-STARRS 1	H	410 m	MPC · JPL
869000	2016 LD_{50}	—	March 16, 2005	Catalina	CSS	·	2.3 km	MPC · JPL

back to top

== Meaning of names ==
As minor planet discoveries are confirmed, they are given a permanent number by the IAU's Minor Planet Center (MPC), and the discoverers can then submit names for them, following the IAU's naming conventions. The list below concerns those minor planets in the specified number-range that have received names, and explains the meanings of those names.

Official naming citations of newly named small Solar System bodies are approved and published in a bulletin by IAU's Working Group for Small Bodies Nomenclature (WGSBN). Before May 2021, citations were published in MPC's Minor Planet Circulars for many decades. Recent citations can also be found on the JPL Small-Body Database (SBDB). Until his death in 2016, German astronomer Lutz D. Schmadel compiled these citations into the Dictionary of Minor Planet Names (DMP) and regularly updated the collection.

Based on Paul Herget's The Names of the Minor Planets, Schmadel also researched the unclear origin of numerous asteroids, most of which had been named prior to World War II. This article incorporates text from this source, which is in the public domain: SBDB New namings may only be added to this list below after official publication as the preannouncement of names is condemned. The WGSBN publishes a comprehensive guideline for the naming rules of non-cometary small Solar System bodies.

Named minor planet	Provisional	This minor planet was named for...	Ref · Catalog
868349 Richie	2016 CE_{268}	Richard (Richie) Stecklum (1981–2007), the discoverer’s eldest son.	IAU · 868349
868690 Fajardo-Acosta	2016 FR_{14}	Sergio Fajardo-Acosta, Mexican-American astronomer working at IPAC at Caltech.	IAU · 868690
