= List of minor planets: 580001–581000 =

The following is a partial list of minor planets, running from minor-planet number 580001 through 581000, inclusive. The primary data for this and other partial lists is based on JPL's "Small-Body Orbital Elements" and data available from the Minor Planet Center. Critical list information is also provided by the MPC, unless otherwise specified from Lowell Observatory. A detailed description of the table's columns and additional sources are given on the main page including a complete list of every page in this series, and a statistical break-up on the dynamical classification of minor planets.

Also see the summary list of all named bodies in numerical and alphabetical order, and the corresponding naming citations for the number range of this particular list. New namings may only be added to this list after official publication, as the preannouncement of names is condemned by the Working Group for Small Bodies Nomenclature of the International Astronomical Union.

Near-Earth obj.	MBA (inner)	MBA (outer)	Centaur
Mars-crosser	MBA (middle)	Jupiter trojan	Trans-Neptunian obj.
Unclassified

== 580001–580100 ==
Designation			Discovery			Properties		Ref
Permanent	Provisional	Named after	Date	Site	Discoverer(s)	Category	Diam.	Ref
580001	2015 AB_{122}	—	January 14, 2015	Haleakala	Pan-STARRS 1	EUN	950 m	MPC · JPL
580002	2015 AS_{123}	—	September 11, 2004	Kitt Peak	Spacewatch	·	1.4 km	MPC · JPL
580003	2015 AV_{125}	—	October 3, 2013	Mount Lemmon	Mount Lemmon Survey	·	1.2 km	MPC · JPL
580004	2015 AZ_{129}	—	April 5, 2008	Mount Lemmon	Mount Lemmon Survey	(5)	1.1 km	MPC · JPL
580005	2015 AN_{131}	—	October 3, 2013	Haleakala	Pan-STARRS 1	·	1.5 km	MPC · JPL
580006	2015 AR_{136}	—	September 3, 2013	Haleakala	Pan-STARRS 1	·	490 m	MPC · JPL
580007	2015 AK_{137}	—	February 8, 2011	Mount Lemmon	Mount Lemmon Survey	·	1.5 km	MPC · JPL
580008	2015 AL_{137}	—	January 14, 2015	Haleakala	Pan-STARRS 1	HOF	2.2 km	MPC · JPL
580009	2015 AR_{139}	—	December 21, 2014	Haleakala	Pan-STARRS 1	·	1.1 km	MPC · JPL
580010	2015 AT_{139}	—	December 1, 2005	Mount Lemmon	Mount Lemmon Survey	·	980 m	MPC · JPL
580011	2015 AN_{145}	—	February 10, 2011	Mount Lemmon	Mount Lemmon Survey	·	1.2 km	MPC · JPL
580012	2015 AP_{146}	—	September 1, 2013	Piszkéstető	K. Sárneczky	·	1.4 km	MPC · JPL
580013	2015 AT_{150}	—	August 4, 2003	Kitt Peak	Spacewatch	EUN	1.4 km	MPC · JPL
580014	2015 AL_{151}	—	January 17, 2007	Kitt Peak	Spacewatch	·	560 m	MPC · JPL
580015	2015 AV_{158}	—	November 11, 2009	Kitt Peak	Spacewatch	·	1.2 km	MPC · JPL
580016	2015 AD_{159}	—	March 6, 2011	Mount Lemmon	Mount Lemmon Survey	(5)	1.0 km	MPC · JPL
580017	2015 AJ_{161}	—	August 30, 2013	Haleakala	Pan-STARRS 1	·	1.2 km	MPC · JPL
580018	2015 AG_{162}	—	January 14, 2015	Haleakala	Pan-STARRS 1	·	450 m	MPC · JPL
580019	2015 AN_{162}	—	December 28, 2005	Kitt Peak	Spacewatch	·	1.4 km	MPC · JPL
580020	2015 AK_{164}	—	February 25, 2012	Mount Lemmon	Mount Lemmon Survey	·	510 m	MPC · JPL
580021	2015 AB_{165}	—	December 22, 2008	Kitt Peak	Spacewatch	·	2.3 km	MPC · JPL
580022	2015 AU_{166}	—	May 3, 2008	Kitt Peak	Spacewatch	·	1.3 km	MPC · JPL
580023	2015 AL_{167}	—	December 21, 2014	Haleakala	Pan-STARRS 1	·	1.9 km	MPC · JPL
580024	2015 AF_{168}	—	November 12, 2006	Mount Lemmon	Mount Lemmon Survey	NYS	1.1 km	MPC · JPL
580025	2015 AT_{169}	—	January 14, 2015	Haleakala	Pan-STARRS 1	H	380 m	MPC · JPL
580026	2015 AR_{170}	—	January 30, 2011	Mount Lemmon	Mount Lemmon Survey	·	1.2 km	MPC · JPL
580027	2015 AJ_{176}	—	April 2, 2011	Haleakala	Pan-STARRS 1	NEM	1.9 km	MPC · JPL
580028	2015 AP_{179}	—	January 14, 2015	Haleakala	Pan-STARRS 1	·	1.3 km	MPC · JPL
580029	2015 AP_{181}	—	May 12, 2012	Mount Lemmon	Mount Lemmon Survey	EUN	1.1 km	MPC · JPL
580030	2015 AS_{184}	—	January 30, 2011	Mount Lemmon	Mount Lemmon Survey	·	1.2 km	MPC · JPL
580031	2015 AB_{188}	—	August 9, 2013	Kitt Peak	Spacewatch	·	760 m	MPC · JPL
580032	2015 AR_{188}	—	October 1, 2005	Kitt Peak	Spacewatch	·	870 m	MPC · JPL
580033	2015 AM_{191}	—	July 4, 2013	Haleakala	Pan-STARRS 1	·	620 m	MPC · JPL
580034	2015 AO_{195}	—	January 14, 2015	Haleakala	Pan-STARRS 1	EUN	1.2 km	MPC · JPL
580035	2015 AW_{199}	—	May 13, 2012	Mount Lemmon	Mount Lemmon Survey	·	1.6 km	MPC · JPL
580036	2015 AC_{208}	—	November 29, 2014	Catalina	CSS	H	430 m	MPC · JPL
580037	2015 AN_{208}	—	December 6, 2010	Mount Lemmon	Mount Lemmon Survey	·	1.3 km	MPC · JPL
580038	2015 AT_{208}	—	November 4, 2014	Mount Lemmon	Mount Lemmon Survey	H	340 m	MPC · JPL
580039	2015 AZ_{211}	—	November 20, 2014	Haleakala	Pan-STARRS 1	·	990 m	MPC · JPL
580040	2015 AS_{213}	—	December 3, 2010	Mount Lemmon	Mount Lemmon Survey	JUN	790 m	MPC · JPL
580041	2015 AX_{213}	—	December 16, 2014	Haleakala	Pan-STARRS 1	MAR	690 m	MPC · JPL
580042	2015 AC_{215}	—	January 15, 2015	Haleakala	Pan-STARRS 1	H	380 m	MPC · JPL
580043	2015 AN_{215}	—	June 11, 2012	Haleakala	Pan-STARRS 1	·	1.3 km	MPC · JPL
580044	2015 AG_{218}	—	January 15, 2015	Haleakala	Pan-STARRS 1	·	1.1 km	MPC · JPL
580045	2015 AJ_{218}	—	January 15, 2015	Haleakala	Pan-STARRS 1	EUN	930 m	MPC · JPL
580046	2015 AQ_{218}	—	January 15, 2015	Haleakala	Pan-STARRS 1	JUN	790 m	MPC · JPL
580047	2015 AU_{219}	—	December 28, 2014	Nogales	M. Schwartz, P. R. Holvorcem	·	1.3 km	MPC · JPL
580048	2015 AL_{224}	—	January 15, 2015	Haleakala	Pan-STARRS 1	·	1.4 km	MPC · JPL
580049	2015 AE_{225}	—	January 15, 2015	Haleakala	Pan-STARRS 1	·	1.5 km	MPC · JPL
580050	2015 AQ_{226}	—	October 28, 2008	Mount Lemmon	Mount Lemmon Survey	·	1.9 km	MPC · JPL
580051	2015 AX_{230}	—	May 3, 2008	Kitt Peak	Spacewatch	·	1.1 km	MPC · JPL
580052	2015 AE_{233}	—	November 26, 2014	Haleakala	Pan-STARRS 1	·	1.6 km	MPC · JPL
580053	2015 AM_{233}	—	October 9, 2008	Mount Lemmon	Mount Lemmon Survey	·	2.0 km	MPC · JPL
580054	2015 AY_{233}	—	November 7, 2007	Kitt Peak	Spacewatch	·	560 m	MPC · JPL
580055	2015 AM_{234}	—	January 15, 2015	Haleakala	Pan-STARRS 1	HNS	710 m	MPC · JPL
580056	2015 AY_{235}	—	December 25, 2005	Kitt Peak	Spacewatch	·	1.8 km	MPC · JPL
580057	2015 AC_{236}	—	January 15, 2015	Haleakala	Pan-STARRS 1	·	1.7 km	MPC · JPL
580058	2015 AE_{236}	—	February 3, 1997	Kitt Peak	Spacewatch	H	360 m	MPC · JPL
580059	2015 AX_{239}	—	October 18, 2009	Mount Lemmon	Mount Lemmon Survey	·	1.1 km	MPC · JPL
580060	2015 AO_{240}	—	November 25, 2005	Kitt Peak	Spacewatch	·	1.5 km	MPC · JPL
580061	2015 AL_{242}	—	December 18, 2009	Mount Lemmon	Mount Lemmon Survey	·	2.1 km	MPC · JPL
580062	2015 AU_{243}	—	April 15, 2007	Catalina	CSS	·	2.1 km	MPC · JPL
580063	2015 AS_{244}	—	January 15, 2015	Haleakala	Pan-STARRS 1	EUN	980 m	MPC · JPL
580064	2015 AL_{245}	—	January 15, 2015	Haleakala	Pan-STARRS 1	·	1.3 km	MPC · JPL
580065	2015 AQ_{245}	—	January 15, 2015	Haleakala	Pan-STARRS 1	EUN	1.1 km	MPC · JPL
580066	2015 AG_{247}	—	November 11, 2001	Apache Point	SDSS Collaboration	·	1.4 km	MPC · JPL
580067	2015 AR_{247}	—	November 29, 2014	Kitt Peak	Spacewatch	AGN	1.1 km	MPC · JPL
580068	2015 AP_{250}	—	November 2, 2007	Kitt Peak	Spacewatch	·	650 m	MPC · JPL
580069	2015 AN_{251}	—	October 25, 2005	Kitt Peak	Spacewatch	JUN	970 m	MPC · JPL
580070	2015 AS_{251}	—	November 23, 2014	Haleakala	Pan-STARRS 1	H	610 m	MPC · JPL
580071	2015 AP_{252}	—	January 14, 2015	Haleakala	Pan-STARRS 1	·	1.3 km	MPC · JPL
580072	2015 AA_{253}	—	October 22, 2003	Kitt Peak	Spacewatch	·	2.1 km	MPC · JPL
580073	2015 AR_{255}	—	November 20, 2014	Haleakala	Pan-STARRS 1	·	1.6 km	MPC · JPL
580074	2015 AN_{257}	—	May 20, 2012	Mount Lemmon	Mount Lemmon Survey	·	2.3 km	MPC · JPL
580075	2015 AO_{258}	—	September 14, 2013	Haleakala	Pan-STARRS 1	L5	6.5 km	MPC · JPL
580076	2015 AX_{261}	—	January 15, 2015	Haleakala	Pan-STARRS 1	·	1.5 km	MPC · JPL
580077	2015 AK_{263}	—	October 6, 2012	Oukaïmeden	C. Rinner	·	2.7 km	MPC · JPL
580078	2015 AU_{263}	—	October 8, 2008	Kitt Peak	Spacewatch	·	1.8 km	MPC · JPL
580079	2015 AU_{264}	—	December 8, 2010	Mount Lemmon	Mount Lemmon Survey	·	1.3 km	MPC · JPL
580080	2015 AC_{266}	—	January 5, 2006	Kitt Peak	Spacewatch	·	1.4 km	MPC · JPL
580081	2015 AC_{272}	—	November 25, 2009	Kitt Peak	Spacewatch	·	1.1 km	MPC · JPL
580082	2015 AF_{273}	—	September 29, 2009	Mount Lemmon	Mount Lemmon Survey	·	1.2 km	MPC · JPL
580083	2015 AM_{275}	—	March 8, 2008	Mount Lemmon	Mount Lemmon Survey	MAR	910 m	MPC · JPL
580084	2015 AS_{275}	—	February 5, 2011	Mount Lemmon	Mount Lemmon Survey	·	1.2 km	MPC · JPL
580085	2015 AA_{276}	—	April 20, 2007	Kitt Peak	Spacewatch	·	1.8 km	MPC · JPL
580086	2015 AL_{276}	—	February 1, 2003	Palomar	NEAT	(194)	1.3 km	MPC · JPL
580087	2015 AM_{276}	—	November 16, 2014	Mount Lemmon	Mount Lemmon Survey	·	1.7 km	MPC · JPL
580088	2015 AS_{278}	—	August 5, 2008	La Sagra	OAM	·	1.6 km	MPC · JPL
580089	2015 AU_{281}	—	January 15, 2015	Haleakala	Pan-STARRS 1	H	450 m	MPC · JPL
580090	2015 AZ_{281}	—	January 12, 2010	Catalina	CSS	H	370 m	MPC · JPL
580091	2015 AB_{282}	—	November 28, 2011	Kitt Peak	Spacewatch	H	490 m	MPC · JPL
580092	2015 AK_{284}	—	September 15, 2006	Socorro	LINEAR	·	1.3 km	MPC · JPL
580093	2015 AY_{284}	—	January 12, 2015	Haleakala	Pan-STARRS 1	·	1.9 km	MPC · JPL
580094	2015 AY_{285}	—	January 14, 2015	Haleakala	Pan-STARRS 1	·	1.5 km	MPC · JPL
580095	2015 AC_{287}	—	May 30, 2003	Socorro	LINEAR	H	560 m	MPC · JPL
580096	2015 AV_{287}	—	October 27, 2009	Mount Lemmon	Mount Lemmon Survey	·	1.7 km	MPC · JPL
580097	2015 AP_{288}	—	March 31, 2012	Mount Lemmon	Mount Lemmon Survey	·	1.0 km	MPC · JPL
580098	2015 AD_{291}	—	January 14, 2015	Haleakala	Pan-STARRS 1	·	1.1 km	MPC · JPL
580099	2015 AC_{297}	—	January 15, 2015	Haleakala	Pan-STARRS 1	V	460 m	MPC · JPL
580100	2015 AD_{300}	—	January 15, 2015	Haleakala	Pan-STARRS 1	·	1.4 km	MPC · JPL

== 580101–580200 ==
back to top

Designation			Discovery			Properties		Ref
Permanent	Provisional	Named after	Date	Site	Discoverer(s)	Category	Diam.	Ref
580101	2015 AZ_{300}	—	January 9, 2015	Haleakala	Pan-STARRS 1	MAR	700 m	MPC · JPL
580102	2015 BD_{1}	—	December 9, 2001	Kitt Peak	Spacewatch	·	1.9 km	MPC · JPL
580103	2015 BF_{1}	—	September 3, 2013	Haleakala	Pan-STARRS 1	·	1.1 km	MPC · JPL
580104	2015 BH_{1}	—	June 14, 2013	Mount Lemmon	Mount Lemmon Survey	·	1.6 km	MPC · JPL
580105	2015 BM_{1}	—	November 22, 2006	Catalina	CSS	·	1.1 km	MPC · JPL
580106	2015 BB_{2}	—	March 16, 2007	Kitt Peak	Spacewatch	·	1.3 km	MPC · JPL
580107	2015 BA_{3}	—	January 16, 2015	Haleakala	Pan-STARRS 1	HOF	2.0 km	MPC · JPL
580108	2015 BP_{3}	—	July 30, 2001	Palomar	NEAT	H	470 m	MPC · JPL
580109	2015 BF_{4}	—	October 2, 2014	Haleakala	Pan-STARRS 1	AMO	280 m	MPC · JPL
580110	2015 BQ_{5}	—	December 14, 2006	Kitt Peak	Spacewatch	·	1.1 km	MPC · JPL
580111	2015 BF_{8}	—	January 8, 2011	Mount Lemmon	Mount Lemmon Survey	·	850 m	MPC · JPL
580112	2015 BM_{8}	—	October 10, 2007	Kitt Peak	Spacewatch	·	560 m	MPC · JPL
580113	2015 BY_{9}	—	January 13, 2011	Mount Lemmon	Mount Lemmon Survey	·	1.1 km	MPC · JPL
580114	2015 BT_{12}	—	September 10, 2004	Kitt Peak	Spacewatch	EUN	1.0 km	MPC · JPL
580115	2015 BE_{13}	—	January 26, 1998	Kitt Peak	Spacewatch	·	1.5 km	MPC · JPL
580116	2015 BQ_{14}	—	April 23, 2004	Kitt Peak	Spacewatch	EUN	1.1 km	MPC · JPL
580117	2015 BF_{17}	—	November 26, 2014	Haleakala	Pan-STARRS 1	·	1.1 km	MPC · JPL
580118	2015 BN_{18}	—	February 8, 2011	Mount Lemmon	Mount Lemmon Survey	·	1.3 km	MPC · JPL
580119	2015 BT_{18}	—	April 18, 2007	Mount Lemmon	Mount Lemmon Survey	AGN	1.2 km	MPC · JPL
580120	2015 BF_{19}	—	May 4, 2008	Kitt Peak	Spacewatch	·	1.4 km	MPC · JPL
580121	2015 BG_{19}	—	February 1, 2011	Piszkés-tető	K. Sárneczky, Z. Kuli	·	1.6 km	MPC · JPL
580122	2015 BA_{20}	—	January 16, 2015	Kitt Peak	Spacewatch	·	2.0 km	MPC · JPL
580123 Gedek	2015 BG_{20}	Gedek	September 8, 2012	Tincana	M. Kusiak, M. Żołnowski	·	2.4 km	MPC · JPL
580124	2015 BB_{21}	—	December 2, 2005	Mount Lemmon	Mount Lemmon Survey	·	1.3 km	MPC · JPL
580125	2015 BH_{21}	—	December 28, 2014	Mount Lemmon	Mount Lemmon Survey	H	480 m	MPC · JPL
580126	2015 BL_{21}	—	November 18, 2006	Mount Lemmon	Mount Lemmon Survey	·	1.3 km	MPC · JPL
580127	2015 BT_{23}	—	October 9, 2008	Kitt Peak	Spacewatch	·	1.7 km	MPC · JPL
580128	2015 BF_{24}	—	September 20, 2003	Palomar	NEAT	H	560 m	MPC · JPL
580129	2015 BH_{24}	—	November 11, 2013	Kitt Peak	Spacewatch	·	2.0 km	MPC · JPL
580130	2015 BJ_{24}	—	January 9, 2011	Mount Lemmon	Mount Lemmon Survey	·	1.6 km	MPC · JPL
580131	2015 BN_{24}	—	September 4, 2008	Kitt Peak	Spacewatch	·	1.4 km	MPC · JPL
580132	2015 BC_{25}	—	September 9, 2008	Mount Lemmon	Mount Lemmon Survey	·	1.3 km	MPC · JPL
580133	2015 BM_{25}	—	December 15, 2001	Apache Point	SDSS Collaboration	EUN	840 m	MPC · JPL
580134	2015 BW_{27}	—	July 29, 2008	Kitt Peak	Spacewatch	HNS	1.0 km	MPC · JPL
580135	2015 BH_{29}	—	March 14, 2011	Mount Lemmon	Mount Lemmon Survey	·	1.2 km	MPC · JPL
580136	2015 BN_{29}	—	January 16, 2015	Haleakala	Pan-STARRS 1	HNS	900 m	MPC · JPL
580137	2015 BR_{31}	—	August 12, 2013	Elena Remote	Oreshko, A.	·	1.5 km	MPC · JPL
580138	2015 BW_{33}	—	February 13, 2011	Mount Lemmon	Mount Lemmon Survey	·	1.6 km	MPC · JPL
580139	2015 BV_{35}	—	January 16, 2015	Haleakala	Pan-STARRS 1	·	2.3 km	MPC · JPL
580140	2015 BX_{35}	—	August 23, 2003	Palomar	NEAT	EUN	1.5 km	MPC · JPL
580141	2015 BB_{36}	—	January 16, 2015	Haleakala	Pan-STARRS 1	·	2.1 km	MPC · JPL
580142	2015 BD_{36}	—	January 16, 2015	Haleakala	Pan-STARRS 1	·	2.0 km	MPC · JPL
580143	2015 BM_{36}	—	January 20, 2012	Kitt Peak	Spacewatch	H	550 m	MPC · JPL
580144	2015 BR_{37}	—	September 23, 2008	Kitt Peak	Spacewatch	·	1.8 km	MPC · JPL
580145	2015 BB_{45}	—	September 3, 2005	Catalina	CSS	(194)	1.5 km	MPC · JPL
580146	2015 BY_{45}	—	October 25, 2001	Apache Point	SDSS	·	1.2 km	MPC · JPL
580147	2015 BF_{47}	—	October 10, 2005	Kitt Peak	Spacewatch	·	1.5 km	MPC · JPL
580148	2015 BY_{47}	—	September 1, 2013	Mount Lemmon	Mount Lemmon Survey	·	1.8 km	MPC · JPL
580149	2015 BG_{48}	—	January 13, 2011	Mount Lemmon	Mount Lemmon Survey	·	1.3 km	MPC · JPL
580150	2015 BW_{51}	—	March 14, 2007	Mount Lemmon	Mount Lemmon Survey	·	1.5 km	MPC · JPL
580151	2015 BZ_{52}	—	September 15, 2013	Haleakala	Pan-STARRS 1	PAD	1.3 km	MPC · JPL
580152	2015 BM_{54}	—	December 27, 2006	Mount Lemmon	Mount Lemmon Survey	·	1.1 km	MPC · JPL
580153	2015 BR_{55}	—	August 30, 2005	Palomar	NEAT	·	1.3 km	MPC · JPL
580154	2015 BX_{55}	—	February 26, 2012	Haleakala	Pan-STARRS 1	·	660 m	MPC · JPL
580155	2015 BP_{58}	—	January 17, 2015	Haleakala	Pan-STARRS 1	·	1.6 km	MPC · JPL
580156	2015 BU_{60}	—	October 7, 2005	Mauna Kea	A. Boattini	·	1.9 km	MPC · JPL
580157	2015 BN_{62}	—	December 17, 2009	Kitt Peak	Spacewatch	·	1.9 km	MPC · JPL
580158	2015 BO_{62}	—	September 4, 2008	Kitt Peak	Spacewatch	·	2.1 km	MPC · JPL
580159	2015 BH_{63}	—	January 6, 2010	Mount Lemmon	Mount Lemmon Survey	·	1.4 km	MPC · JPL
580160	2015 BN_{63}	—	February 13, 2011	Mount Lemmon	Mount Lemmon Survey	EUN	1.2 km	MPC · JPL
580161	2015 BO_{64}	—	March 9, 2007	Kitt Peak	Spacewatch	·	1.5 km	MPC · JPL
580162	2015 BT_{64}	—	January 17, 2015	Haleakala	Pan-STARRS 1	·	1.2 km	MPC · JPL
580163	2015 BK_{65}	—	February 4, 2006	Mount Lemmon	Mount Lemmon Survey	·	1.6 km	MPC · JPL
580164	2015 BS_{65}	—	January 17, 2015	Haleakala	Pan-STARRS 1	·	1.0 km	MPC · JPL
580165	2015 BM_{66}	—	January 17, 2015	Haleakala	Pan-STARRS 1	H	380 m	MPC · JPL
580166	2015 BL_{67}	—	November 11, 2013	Mount Lemmon	Mount Lemmon Survey	·	1.3 km	MPC · JPL
580167	2015 BW_{67}	—	November 25, 2005	Mount Lemmon	Mount Lemmon Survey	·	1.9 km	MPC · JPL
580168	2015 BJ_{70}	—	January 17, 2015	Haleakala	Pan-STARRS 1	·	1.7 km	MPC · JPL
580169	2015 BA_{71}	—	June 18, 2012	Mount Lemmon	Mount Lemmon Survey	MAR	950 m	MPC · JPL
580170	2015 BF_{72}	—	February 17, 2010	Kitt Peak	Spacewatch	·	1.3 km	MPC · JPL
580171	2015 BW_{73}	—	March 14, 2011	Mount Lemmon	Mount Lemmon Survey	·	1.5 km	MPC · JPL
580172	2015 BX_{74}	—	December 25, 2005	Mount Lemmon	Mount Lemmon Survey	·	1.8 km	MPC · JPL
580173	2015 BV_{76}	—	October 28, 2008	Kitt Peak	Spacewatch	·	1.3 km	MPC · JPL
580174	2015 BA_{77}	—	January 17, 2015	Haleakala	Pan-STARRS 1	·	1.5 km	MPC · JPL
580175	2015 BM_{77}	—	January 17, 2015	Haleakala	Pan-STARRS 1	MAR	1.0 km	MPC · JPL
580176	2015 BN_{78}	—	January 18, 2015	ESA OGS	ESA OGS	·	1.8 km	MPC · JPL
580177	2015 BT_{80}	—	September 14, 2013	Kitt Peak	Spacewatch	·	1.6 km	MPC · JPL
580178	2015 BX_{81}	—	February 20, 2009	Kitt Peak	Spacewatch	·	530 m	MPC · JPL
580179	2015 BQ_{84}	—	January 13, 2011	Mount Lemmon	Mount Lemmon Survey	·	960 m	MPC · JPL
580180	2015 BD_{86}	—	February 9, 2011	Mount Lemmon	Mount Lemmon Survey	·	870 m	MPC · JPL
580181	2015 BP_{86}	—	January 18, 2015	Haleakala	Pan-STARRS 1	·	1.9 km	MPC · JPL
580182	2015 BQ_{86}	—	September 5, 1999	Catalina	CSS	·	2.6 km	MPC · JPL
580183	2015 BY_{86}	—	January 18, 2015	Haleakala	Pan-STARRS 1	·	1.3 km	MPC · JPL
580184	2015 BP_{88}	—	January 18, 2015	Haleakala	Pan-STARRS 1	HNS	1.1 km	MPC · JPL
580185	2015 BX_{88}	—	January 11, 2008	Kitt Peak	Spacewatch	V	420 m	MPC · JPL
580186	2015 BG_{89}	—	January 18, 2015	Haleakala	Pan-STARRS 1	·	1.5 km	MPC · JPL
580187	2015 BQ_{89}	—	October 23, 2008	Kitt Peak	Spacewatch	·	1.4 km	MPC · JPL
580188	2015 BS_{89}	—	January 18, 2015	Mount Lemmon	Mount Lemmon Survey	·	1.5 km	MPC · JPL
580189	2015 BU_{89}	—	June 30, 2008	Kitt Peak	Spacewatch	·	1.5 km	MPC · JPL
580190	2015 BD_{90}	—	October 28, 2008	Kitt Peak	Spacewatch	·	1.8 km	MPC · JPL
580191	2015 BV_{90}	—	January 18, 2015	Haleakala	Pan-STARRS 1	HNS	1.1 km	MPC · JPL
580192	2015 BK_{91}	—	December 5, 2010	Mount Lemmon	Mount Lemmon Survey	·	1.1 km	MPC · JPL
580193	2015 BY_{91}	—	July 8, 2003	Palomar	NEAT	H	530 m	MPC · JPL
580194	2015 BM_{93}	—	December 31, 2005	Kitt Peak	Spacewatch	·	2.2 km	MPC · JPL
580195	2015 BS_{93}	—	October 9, 2010	Mount Lemmon	Mount Lemmon Survey	·	1.6 km	MPC · JPL
580196	2015 BW_{93}	—	January 16, 2015	Mount Lemmon	Mount Lemmon Survey	H	480 m	MPC · JPL
580197	2015 BM_{94}	—	January 14, 2011	Kitt Peak	Spacewatch	·	960 m	MPC · JPL
580198	2015 BV_{96}	—	March 5, 2011	Mount Lemmon	Mount Lemmon Survey	·	920 m	MPC · JPL
580199	2015 BZ_{100}	—	January 16, 2015	Mount Lemmon	Mount Lemmon Survey	·	1.1 km	MPC · JPL
580200	2015 BC_{101}	—	October 8, 2008	Mount Lemmon	Mount Lemmon Survey	HOF	2.8 km	MPC · JPL

== 580201–580300 ==
back to top

Designation			Discovery			Properties		Ref
Permanent	Provisional	Named after	Date	Site	Discoverer(s)	Category	Diam.	Ref
580201	2015 BK_{102}	—	May 29, 2008	Mount Lemmon	Mount Lemmon Survey	·	1.7 km	MPC · JPL
580202	2015 BP_{102}	—	January 16, 2015	Haleakala	Pan-STARRS 1	VER	2.2 km	MPC · JPL
580203	2015 BL_{103}	—	October 9, 2013	Mount Lemmon	Mount Lemmon Survey	(5)	1.1 km	MPC · JPL
580204	2015 BR_{103}	—	January 16, 2015	Haleakala	Pan-STARRS 1	·	1.1 km	MPC · JPL
580205	2015 BY_{103}	—	October 26, 2008	Mount Lemmon	Mount Lemmon Survey	·	1.9 km	MPC · JPL
580206	2015 BK_{104}	—	December 21, 2014	Haleakala	Pan-STARRS 1	·	1.7 km	MPC · JPL
580207	2015 BQ_{107}	—	November 27, 2014	Mount Lemmon	Mount Lemmon Survey	ADE	1.9 km	MPC · JPL
580208	2015 BW_{107}	—	October 2, 2009	Mount Lemmon	Mount Lemmon Survey	·	2.0 km	MPC · JPL
580209	2015 BH_{109}	—	November 17, 2009	Mount Lemmon	Mount Lemmon Survey	·	1.5 km	MPC · JPL
580210	2015 BV_{110}	—	November 21, 2014	Haleakala	Pan-STARRS 1	·	850 m	MPC · JPL
580211	2015 BJ_{115}	—	March 1, 2011	Mount Lemmon	Mount Lemmon Survey	·	1.4 km	MPC · JPL
580212	2015 BV_{118}	—	May 1, 2011	Haleakala	Pan-STARRS 1	GEF	970 m	MPC · JPL
580213	2015 BP_{120}	—	January 17, 2015	Haleakala	Pan-STARRS 1	·	550 m	MPC · JPL
580214	2015 BE_{123}	—	August 18, 2003	Haleakala	NEAT	·	2.9 km	MPC · JPL
580215	2015 BA_{125}	—	April 23, 2007	Mount Lemmon	Mount Lemmon Survey	·	1.7 km	MPC · JPL
580216	2015 BN_{125}	—	January 17, 2015	Haleakala	Pan-STARRS 1	·	1.7 km	MPC · JPL
580217	2015 BR_{126}	—	September 11, 2001	Socorro	LINEAR	·	870 m	MPC · JPL
580218	2015 BW_{127}	—	December 5, 2005	Kitt Peak	Spacewatch	·	1.5 km	MPC · JPL
580219	2015 BB_{128}	—	March 11, 2007	Mount Lemmon	Mount Lemmon Survey	(5)	960 m	MPC · JPL
580220	2015 BT_{130}	—	July 1, 2013	Haleakala	Pan-STARRS 1	·	730 m	MPC · JPL
580221	2015 BC_{131}	—	March 28, 2008	Mount Lemmon	Mount Lemmon Survey	MAS	510 m	MPC · JPL
580222	2015 BK_{131}	—	February 10, 2002	Socorro	LINEAR	·	1.6 km	MPC · JPL
580223	2015 BG_{133}	—	November 3, 2005	Mount Lemmon	Mount Lemmon Survey	·	880 m	MPC · JPL
580224	2015 BH_{134}	—	January 17, 2015	Haleakala	Pan-STARRS 1	·	1.6 km	MPC · JPL
580225	2015 BY_{134}	—	October 26, 2013	Mount Lemmon	Mount Lemmon Survey	·	1.6 km	MPC · JPL
580226	2015 BF_{135}	—	October 20, 2003	Kitt Peak	Spacewatch	·	1.6 km	MPC · JPL
580227	2015 BN_{137}	—	April 4, 2011	Catalina	CSS	·	2.3 km	MPC · JPL
580228	2015 BT_{137}	—	October 24, 2013	Mount Lemmon	Mount Lemmon Survey	·	1.5 km	MPC · JPL
580229	2015 BM_{139}	—	August 5, 2008	Siding Spring	SSS	·	1.5 km	MPC · JPL
580230	2015 BN_{139}	—	March 20, 2007	Kitt Peak	Spacewatch	·	1.3 km	MPC · JPL
580231	2015 BJ_{143}	—	January 17, 2015	Haleakala	Pan-STARRS 1	·	1.2 km	MPC · JPL
580232	2015 BY_{143}	—	March 12, 2007	Catalina	CSS	·	1.8 km	MPC · JPL
580233	2015 BH_{144}	—	November 14, 1999	Kitt Peak	Spacewatch	AGN	1.0 km	MPC · JPL
580234	2015 BN_{146}	—	November 16, 2009	Kitt Peak	Spacewatch	·	1.2 km	MPC · JPL
580235	2015 BD_{147}	—	August 26, 2000	Cerro Tololo	Deep Ecliptic Survey	·	1.1 km	MPC · JPL
580236	2015 BZ_{147}	—	December 18, 2014	Haleakala	Pan-STARRS 1	·	2.2 km	MPC · JPL
580237	2015 BK_{148}	—	January 17, 2015	Haleakala	Pan-STARRS 1	·	1.9 km	MPC · JPL
580238	2015 BR_{148}	—	October 3, 2013	Haleakala	Pan-STARRS 1	·	1.1 km	MPC · JPL
580239	2015 BD_{149}	—	January 17, 2015	Haleakala	Pan-STARRS 1	·	2.0 km	MPC · JPL
580240	2015 BG_{150}	—	January 17, 2015	Haleakala	Pan-STARRS 1	·	1.6 km	MPC · JPL
580241	2015 BR_{150}	—	January 17, 2015	Haleakala	Pan-STARRS 1	·	940 m	MPC · JPL
580242	2015 BD_{154}	—	January 17, 2015	Haleakala	Pan-STARRS 1	·	1.7 km	MPC · JPL
580243	2015 BA_{155}	—	January 17, 2015	Haleakala	Pan-STARRS 1	EUN	940 m	MPC · JPL
580244	2015 BJ_{156}	—	November 16, 2009	Kitt Peak	Spacewatch	·	1.8 km	MPC · JPL
580245	2015 BL_{156}	—	October 23, 2003	Kitt Peak	Spacewatch	·	2.2 km	MPC · JPL
580246	2015 BM_{156}	—	May 14, 2009	Kitt Peak	Spacewatch	(883)	790 m	MPC · JPL
580247	2015 BC_{157}	—	November 27, 2014	Haleakala	Pan-STARRS 1	MRX	1.1 km	MPC · JPL
580248	2015 BL_{157}	—	April 6, 2008	Mount Lemmon	Mount Lemmon Survey	·	1.4 km	MPC · JPL
580249	2015 BS_{158}	—	August 30, 2005	Palomar	NEAT	·	1.3 km	MPC · JPL
580250	2015 BK_{161}	—	September 15, 2013	Mount Lemmon	Mount Lemmon Survey	(5)	920 m	MPC · JPL
580251	2015 BG_{163}	—	December 25, 2005	Kitt Peak	Spacewatch	·	1.2 km	MPC · JPL
580252	2015 BH_{163}	—	July 15, 2013	Mauna Kea	M. Micheli, R. J. Wainscoat	·	1.5 km	MPC · JPL
580253	2015 BP_{163}	—	July 29, 2000	Anderson Mesa	LONEOS	EUN	1.3 km	MPC · JPL
580254	2015 BH_{167}	—	December 16, 2007	Kitt Peak	Spacewatch	·	530 m	MPC · JPL
580255	2015 BJ_{168}	—	March 31, 2011	Haleakala	Pan-STARRS 1	·	2.0 km	MPC · JPL
580256	2015 BX_{168}	—	March 13, 2010	Kitt Peak	Spacewatch	·	1.9 km	MPC · JPL
580257	2015 BZ_{171}	—	January 17, 2015	Haleakala	Pan-STARRS 1	·	1.3 km	MPC · JPL
580258	2015 BN_{175}	—	November 20, 2003	Kitt Peak	Deep Ecliptic Survey	·	540 m	MPC · JPL
580259	2015 BB_{176}	—	January 17, 2015	Haleakala	Pan-STARRS 1	·	1.6 km	MPC · JPL
580260	2015 BT_{176}	—	April 19, 2002	Kitt Peak	Spacewatch	·	1.3 km	MPC · JPL
580261	2015 BQ_{177}	—	January 17, 2015	Haleakala	Pan-STARRS 1	AEO	950 m	MPC · JPL
580262	2015 BJ_{180}	—	September 14, 2013	Mount Lemmon	Mount Lemmon Survey	PAD	1.4 km	MPC · JPL
580263	2015 BF_{181}	—	October 11, 2001	Socorro	LINEAR	(5)	1.4 km	MPC · JPL
580264	2015 BO_{181}	—	November 9, 2009	Kitt Peak	Spacewatch	·	1.3 km	MPC · JPL
580265	2015 BB_{183}	—	September 12, 2013	Catalina	CSS	·	1.3 km	MPC · JPL
580266	2015 BS_{184}	—	March 9, 2011	Mount Lemmon	Mount Lemmon Survey	·	1.3 km	MPC · JPL
580267	2015 BV_{184}	—	October 3, 2013	Haleakala	Pan-STARRS 1	·	1.2 km	MPC · JPL
580268	2015 BG_{191}	—	January 17, 2015	Haleakala	Pan-STARRS 1	KOR	1.1 km	MPC · JPL
580269	2015 BR_{192}	—	April 27, 2011	Kitt Peak	Spacewatch	·	1.7 km	MPC · JPL
580270	2015 BB_{193}	—	September 6, 2013	Mount Lemmon	Mount Lemmon Survey	·	1.6 km	MPC · JPL
580271	2015 BV_{194}	—	June 17, 2012	Mount Lemmon	Mount Lemmon Survey	·	1.8 km	MPC · JPL
580272	2015 BD_{195}	—	October 24, 2013	Mount Lemmon	Mount Lemmon Survey	·	990 m	MPC · JPL
580273	2015 BL_{195}	—	September 30, 2013	Mount Lemmon	Mount Lemmon Survey	EUN	1.0 km	MPC · JPL
580274	2015 BL_{196}	—	May 28, 2009	Mount Lemmon	Mount Lemmon Survey	·	580 m	MPC · JPL
580275	2015 BU_{200}	—	January 17, 2015	Haleakala	Pan-STARRS 1	·	1.3 km	MPC · JPL
580276	2015 BK_{201}	—	January 17, 2015	Haleakala	Pan-STARRS 1	MAR	970 m	MPC · JPL
580277	2015 BM_{202}	—	January 17, 2015	Haleakala	Pan-STARRS 1	·	1.3 km	MPC · JPL
580278	2015 BA_{203}	—	November 12, 2001	Apache Point	SDSS Collaboration	·	1.2 km	MPC · JPL
580279	2015 BY_{205}	—	July 28, 2005	Palomar	NEAT	(5)	910 m	MPC · JPL
580280	2015 BQ_{206}	—	December 9, 2010	Mount Lemmon	Mount Lemmon Survey	EUN	1.0 km	MPC · JPL
580281	2015 BA_{207}	—	December 13, 2006	Mount Lemmon	Mount Lemmon Survey	·	1.0 km	MPC · JPL
580282	2015 BF_{210}	—	March 11, 2005	Mount Lemmon	Mount Lemmon Survey	·	630 m	MPC · JPL
580283	2015 BU_{213}	—	September 12, 2009	ESA OGS	ESA OGS	·	1.5 km	MPC · JPL
580284	2015 BT_{219}	—	December 26, 2014	Haleakala	Pan-STARRS 1	·	1.2 km	MPC · JPL
580285	2015 BY_{220}	—	October 5, 2013	Mount Lemmon	Mount Lemmon Survey	HOF	2.0 km	MPC · JPL
580286	2015 BC_{221}	—	January 4, 2011	Mount Lemmon	Mount Lemmon Survey	·	990 m	MPC · JPL
580287	2015 BP_{222}	—	September 13, 2013	Mount Lemmon	Mount Lemmon Survey	·	1.3 km	MPC · JPL
580288	2015 BV_{222}	—	August 23, 2004	Kitt Peak	Spacewatch	·	1.5 km	MPC · JPL
580289	2015 BE_{223}	—	April 18, 2012	Mount Lemmon	Mount Lemmon Survey	·	940 m	MPC · JPL
580290	2015 BY_{223}	—	February 6, 2006	Mount Lemmon	Mount Lemmon Survey	·	1.8 km	MPC · JPL
580291	2015 BB_{224}	—	February 27, 2012	Haleakala	Pan-STARRS 1	·	520 m	MPC · JPL
580292	2015 BO_{225}	—	January 18, 2015	Mount Lemmon	Mount Lemmon Survey	·	1.1 km	MPC · JPL
580293	2015 BE_{228}	—	May 8, 2008	Mount Lemmon	Mount Lemmon Survey	MAR	920 m	MPC · JPL
580294	2015 BH_{229}	—	December 10, 2009	Mount Lemmon	Mount Lemmon Survey	AGN	930 m	MPC · JPL
580295	2015 BS_{229}	—	September 2, 2005	Palomar	NEAT	·	1.3 km	MPC · JPL
580296	2015 BP_{231}	—	April 1, 2011	Mount Lemmon	Mount Lemmon Survey	·	1.4 km	MPC · JPL
580297	2015 BD_{233}	—	November 21, 2008	Kitt Peak	Spacewatch	EOS	1.4 km	MPC · JPL
580298	2015 BU_{233}	—	August 23, 2004	Kitt Peak	Spacewatch	·	1.5 km	MPC · JPL
580299	2015 BD_{236}	—	July 28, 2009	Kitt Peak	Spacewatch	·	980 m	MPC · JPL
580300	2015 BW_{236}	—	March 26, 2007	Kitt Peak	Spacewatch	·	1.3 km	MPC · JPL

== 580301–580400 ==
back to top

Designation			Discovery			Properties		Ref
Permanent	Provisional	Named after	Date	Site	Discoverer(s)	Category	Diam.	Ref
580301 Aznarmacías	2015 BD_{238}	Aznarmacías	September 23, 2014	La Palma	EURONEAR	MAR	1.2 km	MPC · JPL
580302	2015 BL_{238}	—	January 18, 2015	Mount Lemmon	Mount Lemmon Survey	V	480 m	MPC · JPL
580303	2015 BD_{239}	—	September 19, 2009	Kitt Peak	Spacewatch	·	1.4 km	MPC · JPL
580304	2015 BB_{240}	—	February 11, 2011	Mount Lemmon	Mount Lemmon Survey	·	1.1 km	MPC · JPL
580305	2015 BC_{241}	—	January 18, 2015	Haleakala	Pan-STARRS 1	KOR	990 m	MPC · JPL
580306	2015 BR_{241}	—	January 6, 2010	Kitt Peak	Spacewatch	H	350 m	MPC · JPL
580307	2015 BS_{241}	—	August 23, 2003	Palomar	NEAT	·	1.9 km	MPC · JPL
580308	2015 BY_{241}	—	September 18, 2009	Catalina	CSS	ADE	1.8 km	MPC · JPL
580309	2015 BS_{248}	—	March 6, 2011	Mount Lemmon	Mount Lemmon Survey	·	1.3 km	MPC · JPL
580310	2015 BU_{252}	—	September 1, 2005	Kitt Peak	Spacewatch	(5)	1.0 km	MPC · JPL
580311 Saselemér	2011 BN_{47}	Saselemér	January 31, 2011	Piszkéstető	K. Sárneczky, Z. Kuli	·	1.1 km	MPC · JPL
580312	2015 BO_{256}	—	November 17, 2009	Mount Lemmon	Mount Lemmon Survey	·	1.3 km	MPC · JPL
580313	2015 BZ_{256}	—	May 30, 2012	Mount Lemmon	Mount Lemmon Survey	·	1.6 km	MPC · JPL
580314	2015 BU_{258}	—	October 20, 2007	Mount Lemmon	Mount Lemmon Survey	HYG	2.6 km	MPC · JPL
580315	2015 BK_{259}	—	January 28, 2011	Kitt Peak	Spacewatch	·	680 m	MPC · JPL
580316	2015 BW_{259}	—	December 10, 2009	Mount Lemmon	Mount Lemmon Survey	·	2.0 km	MPC · JPL
580317	2015 BB_{260}	—	April 27, 2012	Haleakala	Pan-STARRS 1	·	590 m	MPC · JPL
580318	2015 BE_{260}	—	December 18, 2014	Haleakala	Pan-STARRS 1	·	1.6 km	MPC · JPL
580319	2015 BK_{260}	—	November 25, 2009	Kitt Peak	Spacewatch	EUN	1.5 km	MPC · JPL
580320	2015 BY_{261}	—	August 13, 2012	Haleakala	Pan-STARRS 1	·	2.1 km	MPC · JPL
580321	2015 BE_{262}	—	March 1, 2011	Mount Lemmon	Mount Lemmon Survey	·	1.2 km	MPC · JPL
580322	2015 BH_{264}	—	November 3, 2014	Mount Lemmon	Mount Lemmon Survey	·	2.7 km	MPC · JPL
580323	2015 BO_{264}	—	April 30, 2011	Mount Lemmon	Mount Lemmon Survey	·	1.5 km	MPC · JPL
580324	2015 BH_{266}	—	October 30, 2006	Mount Lemmon	Mount Lemmon Survey	·	1.6 km	MPC · JPL
580325	2015 BP_{266}	—	July 2, 2013	Haleakala	Pan-STARRS 1	·	3.0 km	MPC · JPL
580326	2015 BW_{266}	—	November 30, 2014	Haleakala	Pan-STARRS 1	·	1.7 km	MPC · JPL
580327	2015 BS_{268}	—	December 21, 2014	Mount Lemmon	Mount Lemmon Survey	·	2.0 km	MPC · JPL
580328	2015 BA_{272}	—	January 14, 2011	Mount Lemmon	Mount Lemmon Survey	JUN	700 m	MPC · JPL
580329	2015 BY_{273}	—	January 18, 2008	Mount Lemmon	Mount Lemmon Survey	·	1.2 km	MPC · JPL
580330	2015 BH_{277}	—	October 25, 2001	Apache Point	SDSS Collaboration	(5)	760 m	MPC · JPL
580331	2015 BX_{277}	—	January 19, 2015	Mount Lemmon	Mount Lemmon Survey	·	1.2 km	MPC · JPL
580332	2015 BM_{278}	—	July 11, 2007	Lulin	LUSS	615	1.6 km	MPC · JPL
580333	2015 BJ_{280}	—	February 21, 2007	Mount Lemmon	Mount Lemmon Survey	MAR	800 m	MPC · JPL
580334	2015 BZ_{280}	—	October 3, 2013	Kitt Peak	Spacewatch	·	1.6 km	MPC · JPL
580335	2015 BJ_{282}	—	January 19, 2015	Haleakala	Pan-STARRS 1	·	1.2 km	MPC · JPL
580336	2015 BP_{282}	—	October 28, 2014	Haleakala	Pan-STARRS 1	·	1.2 km	MPC · JPL
580337	2015 BR_{285}	—	March 5, 2011	Kitt Peak	Spacewatch	·	1.6 km	MPC · JPL
580338	2015 BG_{286}	—	October 7, 2005	Kitt Peak	Spacewatch	·	1.1 km	MPC · JPL
580339	2015 BF_{287}	—	January 19, 2015	Haleakala	Pan-STARRS 1	·	1.7 km	MPC · JPL
580340	2015 BL_{289}	—	January 19, 2015	Haleakala	Pan-STARRS 1	·	610 m	MPC · JPL
580341	2015 BC_{291}	—	November 24, 2009	Kitt Peak	Spacewatch	EUN	1.3 km	MPC · JPL
580342	2015 BH_{293}	—	September 3, 2013	Calar Alto	F. Hormuth	MAR	1.0 km	MPC · JPL
580343	2015 BA_{294}	—	April 18, 2007	Mount Lemmon	Mount Lemmon Survey	·	1.7 km	MPC · JPL
580344	2015 BB_{294}	—	December 2, 2014	Haleakala	Pan-STARRS 1	·	1.8 km	MPC · JPL
580345	2015 BA_{295}	—	February 16, 2002	Palomar	NEAT	HNS	1.5 km	MPC · JPL
580346	2015 BM_{295}	—	March 26, 2011	Kitt Peak	Spacewatch	526	1.9 km	MPC · JPL
580347	2015 BU_{295}	—	September 1, 2005	Palomar	NEAT	·	1.5 km	MPC · JPL
580348	2015 BO_{297}	—	April 27, 2011	Kitt Peak	Spacewatch	·	2.0 km	MPC · JPL
580349	2015 BR_{297}	—	April 24, 2007	Mount Lemmon	Mount Lemmon Survey	·	980 m	MPC · JPL
580350	2015 BH_{299}	—	January 19, 2015	Haleakala	Pan-STARRS 1	H	550 m	MPC · JPL
580351	2015 BL_{299}	—	November 29, 2005	Kitt Peak	Spacewatch	·	1.0 km	MPC · JPL
580352	2015 BN_{299}	—	January 19, 2015	Haleakala	Pan-STARRS 1	H	440 m	MPC · JPL
580353	2015 BQ_{299}	—	November 19, 2009	Mount Lemmon	Mount Lemmon Survey	·	1.0 km	MPC · JPL
580354	2015 BW_{302}	—	December 29, 2014	Haleakala	Pan-STARRS 1	·	2.3 km	MPC · JPL
580355	2015 BQ_{303}	—	February 4, 2003	Haleakala	NEAT	·	1.2 km	MPC · JPL
580356	2015 BC_{304}	—	December 20, 2009	Mount Lemmon	Mount Lemmon Survey	·	2.4 km	MPC · JPL
580357	2015 BR_{304}	—	January 19, 2015	Haleakala	Pan-STARRS 1	·	580 m	MPC · JPL
580358	2015 BB_{305}	—	February 16, 2002	Palomar	NEAT	EUN	1.3 km	MPC · JPL
580359	2015 BM_{305}	—	February 14, 2005	Kitt Peak	Spacewatch	·	2.6 km	MPC · JPL
580360	2015 BD_{308}	—	September 21, 2003	Kitt Peak	Spacewatch	·	2.2 km	MPC · JPL
580361	2015 BU_{315}	—	November 14, 2006	Kitt Peak	Spacewatch	·	1.2 km	MPC · JPL
580362	2015 BX_{319}	—	January 16, 2015	Mount Lemmon	Mount Lemmon Survey	·	570 m	MPC · JPL
580363	2015 BA_{320}	—	December 30, 2007	Mount Lemmon	Mount Lemmon Survey	·	440 m	MPC · JPL
580364	2015 BF_{320}	—	October 3, 2013	Haleakala	Pan-STARRS 1	HOF	2.0 km	MPC · JPL
580365	2015 BU_{320}	—	January 17, 2015	Haleakala	Pan-STARRS 1	(17392)	1.2 km	MPC · JPL
580366	2015 BX_{320}	—	October 3, 2013	Haleakala	Pan-STARRS 1	·	650 m	MPC · JPL
580367	2015 BO_{321}	—	August 25, 2008	Marly	P. Kocher	H	510 m	MPC · JPL
580368	2015 BP_{322}	—	September 24, 2013	Mount Lemmon	Mount Lemmon Survey	·	1.3 km	MPC · JPL
580369	2015 BQ_{322}	—	January 17, 2015	Haleakala	Pan-STARRS 1	·	1.2 km	MPC · JPL
580370	2015 BM_{324}	—	October 13, 2013	Kitt Peak	Spacewatch	·	1.5 km	MPC · JPL
580371	2015 BZ_{324}	—	January 17, 2015	Haleakala	Pan-STARRS 1	·	600 m	MPC · JPL
580372	2015 BN_{325}	—	December 18, 2014	Haleakala	Pan-STARRS 1	EUN	960 m	MPC · JPL
580373	2015 BO_{329}	—	June 16, 2012	Haleakala	Pan-STARRS 1	AGN	1.2 km	MPC · JPL
580374	2015 BL_{334}	—	March 23, 2007	Mauna Kea	D. D. Balam, K. M. Perrett	EUN	820 m	MPC · JPL
580375	2015 BZ_{337}	—	January 26, 2011	Kitt Peak	Spacewatch	EUN	770 m	MPC · JPL
580376	2015 BA_{338}	—	March 29, 2012	Haleakala	Pan-STARRS 1	·	580 m	MPC · JPL
580377	2015 BS_{338}	—	November 26, 2014	Haleakala	Pan-STARRS 1	EUN	1.2 km	MPC · JPL
580378	2015 BC_{340}	—	January 17, 2015	Haleakala	Pan-STARRS 1	·	920 m	MPC · JPL
580379	2015 BJ_{340}	—	October 24, 2013	Mount Lemmon	Mount Lemmon Survey	·	1.5 km	MPC · JPL
580380	2015 BF_{341}	—	August 15, 2004	Cerro Tololo	Deep Ecliptic Survey	·	1.5 km	MPC · JPL
580381	2015 BS_{344}	—	November 23, 2009	Kitt Peak	Spacewatch	·	1.1 km	MPC · JPL
580382	2015 BT_{344}	—	October 24, 2013	Mount Lemmon	Mount Lemmon Survey	·	1.1 km	MPC · JPL
580383	2015 BH_{347}	—	September 19, 2009	Mount Lemmon	Mount Lemmon Survey	·	1.7 km	MPC · JPL
580384	2015 BG_{350}	—	March 9, 2007	Kitt Peak	Spacewatch	·	1.3 km	MPC · JPL
580385	2015 BD_{351}	—	December 26, 2014	Haleakala	Pan-STARRS 1	·	1.3 km	MPC · JPL
580386	2015 BE_{352}	—	January 13, 2011	Kitt Peak	Spacewatch	·	1.1 km	MPC · JPL
580387	2015 BY_{352}	—	May 10, 2007	Mount Lemmon	Mount Lemmon Survey	ADE	1.7 km	MPC · JPL
580388	2015 BC_{354}	—	June 22, 2012	Bergisch Gladbach	W. Bickel	·	1.9 km	MPC · JPL
580389	2015 BH_{357}	—	January 20, 2015	Kitt Peak	Spacewatch	·	1.1 km	MPC · JPL
580390	2015 BN_{357}	—	January 28, 2011	Mount Lemmon	Mount Lemmon Survey	·	1.7 km	MPC · JPL
580391	2015 BW_{367}	—	November 18, 2009	Kitt Peak	Spacewatch	·	1.6 km	MPC · JPL
580392	2015 BZ_{369}	—	January 8, 2011	Mount Lemmon	Mount Lemmon Survey	·	950 m	MPC · JPL
580393	2015 BT_{372}	—	November 21, 2014	Haleakala	Pan-STARRS 1	·	1.3 km	MPC · JPL
580394	2015 BA_{377}	—	February 26, 2007	Mount Lemmon	Mount Lemmon Survey	·	1.4 km	MPC · JPL
580395	2015 BZ_{378}	—	September 6, 2008	Mount Lemmon	Mount Lemmon Survey	·	1.5 km	MPC · JPL
580396	2015 BD_{382}	—	March 29, 2012	Haleakala	Pan-STARRS 1	·	520 m	MPC · JPL
580397	2015 BT_{382}	—	December 5, 2005	Mount Lemmon	Mount Lemmon Survey	·	1.1 km	MPC · JPL
580398	2015 BP_{383}	—	May 20, 2012	Mount Lemmon	Mount Lemmon Survey	·	1.4 km	MPC · JPL
580399	2015 BM_{384}	—	April 29, 2008	Mount Lemmon	Mount Lemmon Survey	·	850 m	MPC · JPL
580400	2015 BB_{386}	—	May 12, 2012	Haleakala	Pan-STARRS 1	·	1.2 km	MPC · JPL

== 580401–580500 ==
back to top

Designation			Discovery			Properties		Ref
Permanent	Provisional	Named after	Date	Site	Discoverer(s)	Category	Diam.	Ref
580401	2015 BU_{387}	—	October 22, 2009	Mount Lemmon	Mount Lemmon Survey	·	1.2 km	MPC · JPL
580402	2015 BO_{390}	—	October 26, 2013	Mount Lemmon	Mount Lemmon Survey	NEM	2.1 km	MPC · JPL
580403	2015 BC_{391}	—	January 20, 2015	Haleakala	Pan-STARRS 1	·	1.2 km	MPC · JPL
580404	2015 BC_{392}	—	March 31, 2008	Mount Lemmon	Mount Lemmon Survey	MAS	510 m	MPC · JPL
580405	2015 BV_{392}	—	September 24, 2004	Kitt Peak	Spacewatch	·	1.3 km	MPC · JPL
580406	2015 BV_{393}	—	September 25, 2008	Mount Lemmon	Mount Lemmon Survey	·	1.4 km	MPC · JPL
580407	2015 BX_{394}	—	January 20, 2015	Haleakala	Pan-STARRS 1	·	1.4 km	MPC · JPL
580408	2015 BB_{395}	—	January 20, 2015	Haleakala	Pan-STARRS 1	·	2.0 km	MPC · JPL
580409	2015 BK_{396}	—	January 20, 2015	Haleakala	Pan-STARRS 1	·	1.2 km	MPC · JPL
580410	2015 BY_{398}	—	October 22, 2003	Kitt Peak	Deep Ecliptic Survey	·	460 m	MPC · JPL
580411	2015 BH_{403}	—	September 23, 2008	Kitt Peak	Spacewatch	HOF	2.4 km	MPC · JPL
580412	2015 BL_{403}	—	January 20, 2015	Haleakala	Pan-STARRS 1	·	1.3 km	MPC · JPL
580413	2015 BL_{404}	—	March 5, 2002	Apache Point	SDSS Collaboration	·	1.5 km	MPC · JPL
580414	2015 BG_{407}	—	July 6, 2003	Kitt Peak	Spacewatch	·	2.2 km	MPC · JPL
580415	2015 BK_{407}	—	April 27, 2012	Mount Lemmon	Mount Lemmon Survey	·	1.4 km	MPC · JPL
580416	2015 BO_{410}	—	October 21, 2008	Kitt Peak	Spacewatch	KOR	1.2 km	MPC · JPL
580417	2015 BG_{411}	—	January 20, 2015	Haleakala	Pan-STARRS 1	·	1.3 km	MPC · JPL
580418	2015 BL_{411}	—	January 7, 2006	Kitt Peak	Spacewatch	EUN	860 m	MPC · JPL
580419	2015 BU_{412}	—	February 8, 2011	Kitt Peak	Spacewatch	·	1.3 km	MPC · JPL
580420	2015 BJ_{415}	—	January 20, 2015	Haleakala	Pan-STARRS 1	·	870 m	MPC · JPL
580421	2015 BD_{416}	—	October 1, 2013	Calar Alto-CASADO	Mottola, S., Proffe, G.	·	1.6 km	MPC · JPL
580422	2015 BK_{419}	—	July 29, 2008	Mount Lemmon	Mount Lemmon Survey	H	320 m	MPC · JPL
580423	2015 BL_{420}	—	January 20, 2015	Haleakala	Pan-STARRS 1	HNS	900 m	MPC · JPL
580424	2015 BH_{422}	—	November 17, 2009	Mount Lemmon	Mount Lemmon Survey	(5)	1.2 km	MPC · JPL
580425	2015 BJ_{423}	—	December 29, 2013	Haleakala	Pan-STARRS 1	EUN	1.1 km	MPC · JPL
580426	2015 BU_{423}	—	December 1, 2005	Kitt Peak	Wasserman, L. H., Millis, R. L.	·	2.0 km	MPC · JPL
580427	2015 BR_{425}	—	November 12, 2010	Mount Lemmon	Mount Lemmon Survey	·	680 m	MPC · JPL
580428	2015 BD_{426}	—	January 31, 2006	Kitt Peak	Spacewatch	·	1.4 km	MPC · JPL
580429	2015 BX_{427}	—	January 20, 2015	Haleakala	Pan-STARRS 1	KOR	1.2 km	MPC · JPL
580430	2015 BB_{429}	—	November 11, 2013	Kitt Peak	Spacewatch	·	1.4 km	MPC · JPL
580431	2015 BT_{430}	—	April 2, 2011	Kitt Peak	Spacewatch	AGN	1.1 km	MPC · JPL
580432	2015 BM_{432}	—	September 15, 2007	Kitt Peak	Spacewatch	·	2.1 km	MPC · JPL
580433	2015 BD_{433}	—	January 2, 2011	Mount Lemmon	Mount Lemmon Survey	·	780 m	MPC · JPL
580434	2015 BN_{433}	—	January 20, 2015	Haleakala	Pan-STARRS 1	MAR	780 m	MPC · JPL
580435	2015 BX_{433}	—	February 6, 2002	Kitt Peak	Deep Ecliptic Survey	·	1.4 km	MPC · JPL
580436	2015 BH_{439}	—	January 20, 2015	Haleakala	Pan-STARRS 1	EUN	1.0 km	MPC · JPL
580437	2015 BA_{441}	—	October 31, 2005	Mauna Kea	A. Boattini	·	1.7 km	MPC · JPL
580438	2015 BY_{441}	—	April 14, 2011	Mount Lemmon	Mount Lemmon Survey	·	2.1 km	MPC · JPL
580439	2015 BT_{442}	—	October 13, 2004	Moletai	K. Černis, Zdanavicius, J.	·	1.8 km	MPC · JPL
580440	2015 BW_{442}	—	October 16, 2001	Palomar	NEAT	·	940 m	MPC · JPL
580441	2015 BE_{443}	—	January 20, 2015	Haleakala	Pan-STARRS 1	·	1.3 km	MPC · JPL
580442	2015 BK_{446}	—	April 3, 2011	Haleakala	Pan-STARRS 1	·	1.2 km	MPC · JPL
580443	2015 BF_{447}	—	November 1, 2013	Mount Lemmon	Mount Lemmon Survey	·	1.3 km	MPC · JPL
580444	2015 BG_{447}	—	January 23, 2006	Kitt Peak	Spacewatch	·	2.4 km	MPC · JPL
580445	2015 BD_{449}	—	January 20, 2015	Haleakala	Pan-STARRS 1	·	1.6 km	MPC · JPL
580446	2015 BK_{450}	—	January 20, 2015	Haleakala	Pan-STARRS 1	NEM	2.0 km	MPC · JPL
580447	2015 BL_{450}	—	September 12, 2007	Mount Lemmon	Mount Lemmon Survey	BRA	1.3 km	MPC · JPL
580448	2015 BT_{450}	—	October 15, 2002	Palomar	NEAT	·	2.2 km	MPC · JPL
580449	2015 BN_{451}	—	August 26, 2012	Haleakala	Pan-STARRS 1	·	1.9 km	MPC · JPL
580450	2015 BD_{456}	—	May 12, 2007	Mount Lemmon	Mount Lemmon Survey	·	1.2 km	MPC · JPL
580451	2015 BG_{456}	—	April 26, 2008	Kitt Peak	Spacewatch	NYS	880 m	MPC · JPL
580452	2015 BR_{458}	—	September 27, 2009	Mount Lemmon	Mount Lemmon Survey	·	1.0 km	MPC · JPL
580453	2015 BE_{459}	—	December 29, 2005	Kitt Peak	Spacewatch	·	1.3 km	MPC · JPL
580454	2015 BG_{459}	—	October 31, 2005	Mauna Kea	A. Boattini	·	2.0 km	MPC · JPL
580455	2015 BV_{461}	—	August 17, 2009	Catalina	CSS	·	1.0 km	MPC · JPL
580456	2015 BY_{461}	—	January 23, 2006	Kitt Peak	Spacewatch	·	1.7 km	MPC · JPL
580457	2015 BS_{464}	—	December 1, 2014	Haleakala	Pan-STARRS 1	HNS	1.2 km	MPC · JPL
580458	2015 BJ_{465}	—	December 16, 2011	XuYi	PMO NEO Survey Program	H	470 m	MPC · JPL
580459	2015 BG_{467}	—	June 19, 2012	ESA OGS	ESA OGS	PHO	940 m	MPC · JPL
580460	2015 BA_{468}	—	November 16, 2009	Mount Lemmon	Mount Lemmon Survey	·	2.1 km	MPC · JPL
580461	2015 BH_{470}	—	October 5, 2013	Haleakala	Pan-STARRS 1	·	1.2 km	MPC · JPL
580462	2015 BX_{474}	—	December 25, 2005	Mount Lemmon	Mount Lemmon Survey	·	1.1 km	MPC · JPL
580463	2015 BL_{475}	—	January 20, 2015	Haleakala	Pan-STARRS 1	·	1.3 km	MPC · JPL
580464	2015 BW_{475}	—	September 4, 2008	Kitt Peak	Spacewatch	AGN	1.0 km	MPC · JPL
580465	2015 BW_{482}	—	October 1, 2013	Kitt Peak	Spacewatch	AGN	940 m	MPC · JPL
580466	2015 BH_{484}	—	January 20, 2015	Haleakala	Pan-STARRS 1	EUN	830 m	MPC · JPL
580467	2015 BP_{484}	—	February 27, 2012	Haleakala	Pan-STARRS 1	·	680 m	MPC · JPL
580468	2015 BY_{485}	—	March 7, 2008	Mount Lemmon	Mount Lemmon Survey	·	790 m	MPC · JPL
580469	2015 BZ_{489}	—	January 23, 2006	Mount Lemmon	Mount Lemmon Survey	·	1.3 km	MPC · JPL
580470	2015 BO_{491}	—	January 29, 2011	Kitt Peak	Spacewatch	·	1.1 km	MPC · JPL
580471	2015 BX_{491}	—	October 4, 2006	Mount Lemmon	Mount Lemmon Survey	CLA	1.3 km	MPC · JPL
580472	2015 BA_{493}	—	March 14, 2007	Mount Lemmon	Mount Lemmon Survey	·	1.4 km	MPC · JPL
580473	2015 BE_{494}	—	March 26, 2011	Kitt Peak	Spacewatch	·	1.7 km	MPC · JPL
580474	2015 BJ_{495}	—	January 20, 2015	Haleakala	Pan-STARRS 1	·	1.2 km	MPC · JPL
580475	2015 BX_{495}	—	November 9, 2013	Kitt Peak	Spacewatch	·	1.6 km	MPC · JPL
580476	2015 BD_{496}	—	January 31, 2006	Kitt Peak	Spacewatch	WIT	740 m	MPC · JPL
580477	2015 BR_{500}	—	January 20, 2015	Haleakala	Pan-STARRS 1	·	1.6 km	MPC · JPL
580478	2015 BU_{501}	—	April 23, 2012	Kitt Peak	Spacewatch	·	1.5 km	MPC · JPL
580479	2015 BV_{501}	—	July 6, 2003	Kitt Peak	Spacewatch	·	2.1 km	MPC · JPL
580480	2015 BS_{502}	—	January 7, 2006	Kitt Peak	Spacewatch	·	1.3 km	MPC · JPL
580481	2015 BU_{502}	—	November 1, 2013	Mount Lemmon	Mount Lemmon Survey	·	1.5 km	MPC · JPL
580482	2015 BJ_{504}	—	September 2, 2008	Kitt Peak	Spacewatch	·	1.8 km	MPC · JPL
580483	2015 BQ_{504}	—	August 6, 2004	Palomar	NEAT	·	1.2 km	MPC · JPL
580484	2015 BQ_{506}	—	February 20, 2006	Mount Lemmon	Mount Lemmon Survey	·	1.9 km	MPC · JPL
580485	2015 BB_{507}	—	October 3, 2013	Haleakala	Pan-STARRS 1	(5)	1.0 km	MPC · JPL
580486	2015 BH_{507}	—	September 30, 2003	Kitt Peak	Spacewatch	·	1.7 km	MPC · JPL
580487	2015 BX_{510}	—	September 1, 2011	Haleakala	Pan-STARRS 1	H	560 m	MPC · JPL
580488	2015 BB_{512}	—	January 23, 2015	Haleakala	Pan-STARRS 1	·	1.8 km	MPC · JPL
580489	2015 BX_{519}	—	February 10, 2007	Mount Lemmon	Mount Lemmon Survey	H	380 m	MPC · JPL
580490	2015 BZ_{519}	—	January 3, 2012	Mount Lemmon	Mount Lemmon Survey	H	580 m	MPC · JPL
580491	2015 BB_{520}	—	December 14, 2006	Kitt Peak	Spacewatch	H	510 m	MPC · JPL
580492	2015 BC_{520}	—	January 19, 2015	Haleakala	Pan-STARRS 1	·	270 m	MPC · JPL
580493	2015 BK_{520}	—	September 8, 2005	Siding Spring	SSS	H	440 m	MPC · JPL
580494	2015 BC_{521}	—	January 28, 2015	Haleakala	Pan-STARRS 1	H	410 m	MPC · JPL
580495	2015 BE_{521}	—	September 8, 2000	Kitt Peak	Spacewatch	H	410 m	MPC · JPL
580496	2015 BH_{527}	—	August 2, 2013	Haleakala	Pan-STARRS 1	H	380 m	MPC · JPL
580497	2015 BO_{528}	—	January 23, 2015	Catalina	CSS	H	550 m	MPC · JPL
580498	2015 BV_{528}	—	January 9, 2006	Kitt Peak	Spacewatch	·	2.2 km	MPC · JPL
580499	2015 BQ_{533}	—	January 29, 2015	Haleakala	Pan-STARRS 1	·	1.5 km	MPC · JPL
580500	2015 BD_{534}	—	August 20, 2003	Palomar	NEAT	·	2.2 km	MPC · JPL

== 580501–580600 ==
back to top

Designation			Discovery			Properties		Ref
Permanent	Provisional	Named after	Date	Site	Discoverer(s)	Category	Diam.	Ref
580501	2015 BE_{534}	—	January 26, 2015	Haleakala	Pan-STARRS 1	·	1.5 km	MPC · JPL
580502	2015 BO_{534}	—	September 28, 2008	Mount Lemmon	Mount Lemmon Survey	·	1.5 km	MPC · JPL
580503	2015 BV_{534}	—	March 11, 2005	Mount Lemmon	Mount Lemmon Survey	·	1.6 km	MPC · JPL
580504	2015 BH_{536}	—	April 11, 2010	Mount Lemmon	Mount Lemmon Survey	·	2.2 km	MPC · JPL
580505	2015 BO_{536}	—	January 27, 2006	Mount Lemmon	Mount Lemmon Survey	·	1.6 km	MPC · JPL
580506	2015 BV_{536}	—	April 5, 2011	Mount Lemmon	Mount Lemmon Survey	·	1.6 km	MPC · JPL
580507	2015 BA_{539}	—	October 25, 2013	Mount Lemmon	Mount Lemmon Survey	PAD	1.2 km	MPC · JPL
580508	2015 BU_{542}	—	January 28, 2015	Haleakala	Pan-STARRS 1	·	2.8 km	MPC · JPL
580509	2015 BE_{543}	—	September 6, 2008	Mount Lemmon	Mount Lemmon Survey	·	1.4 km	MPC · JPL
580510	2015 BG_{545}	—	January 20, 2015	Haleakala	Pan-STARRS 1	·	2.1 km	MPC · JPL
580511	2015 BP_{545}	—	October 10, 2012	Mount Lemmon	Mount Lemmon Survey	·	2.6 km	MPC · JPL
580512	2015 BS_{545}	—	January 23, 2015	Haleakala	Pan-STARRS 1	·	1.9 km	MPC · JPL
580513	2015 BX_{545}	—	January 30, 2011	Kitt Peak	Spacewatch	·	1.1 km	MPC · JPL
580514	2015 BC_{546}	—	August 24, 2011	Haleakala	Pan-STARRS 1	·	2.9 km	MPC · JPL
580515	2015 BD_{546}	—	January 31, 2009	Mount Lemmon	Mount Lemmon Survey	·	2.4 km	MPC · JPL
580516	2015 BG_{546}	—	January 17, 2015	Haleakala	Pan-STARRS 1	·	1.3 km	MPC · JPL
580517	2015 BJ_{546}	—	November 16, 2009	Mount Lemmon	Mount Lemmon Survey	·	940 m	MPC · JPL
580518	2015 BA_{549}	—	November 25, 2005	Mount Lemmon	Mount Lemmon Survey	·	1.4 km	MPC · JPL
580519	2015 BS_{549}	—	December 22, 2005	Kitt Peak	Spacewatch	·	1.4 km	MPC · JPL
580520	2015 BM_{550}	—	January 17, 2015	Mount Lemmon	Mount Lemmon Survey	·	1.7 km	MPC · JPL
580521	2015 BE_{551}	—	October 5, 2013	Haleakala	Pan-STARRS 1	·	1.2 km	MPC · JPL
580522	2015 BF_{555}	—	January 17, 2015	Mount Lemmon	Mount Lemmon Survey	EUN	1.1 km	MPC · JPL
580523	2015 BE_{556}	—	November 21, 2014	Haleakala	Pan-STARRS 1	·	1.3 km	MPC · JPL
580524	2015 BR_{556}	—	December 8, 2010	Mount Lemmon	Mount Lemmon Survey	·	800 m	MPC · JPL
580525	2015 BV_{556}	—	October 25, 2013	Mount Lemmon	Mount Lemmon Survey	KOR	1.2 km	MPC · JPL
580526	2015 BO_{558}	—	September 30, 2003	Kitt Peak	Spacewatch	·	540 m	MPC · JPL
580527	2015 BA_{561}	—	November 29, 2014	Haleakala	Pan-STARRS 1	EUN	1.1 km	MPC · JPL
580528	2015 BV_{562}	—	October 24, 2013	Mount Lemmon	Mount Lemmon Survey	AGN	940 m	MPC · JPL
580529	2015 BR_{563}	—	October 3, 2013	Haleakala	Pan-STARRS 1	·	1.3 km	MPC · JPL
580530	2015 BE_{564}	—	May 5, 2003	Kitt Peak	Spacewatch	·	1.6 km	MPC · JPL
580531	2015 BK_{566}	—	January 20, 2015	Haleakala	Pan-STARRS 1	·	1.3 km	MPC · JPL
580532	2015 BZ_{566}	—	April 2, 2011	Haleakala	Pan-STARRS 1	·	1.7 km	MPC · JPL
580533	2015 BM_{568}	—	January 21, 2015	Haleakala	Pan-STARRS 1	EUN	820 m	MPC · JPL
580534	2015 BQ_{568}	—	January 19, 2015	Haleakala	Pan-STARRS 1	·	2.3 km	MPC · JPL
580535	2015 BF_{572}	—	January 21, 2015	Haleakala	Pan-STARRS 1	·	1.6 km	MPC · JPL
580536	2015 BF_{577}	—	January 17, 2015	Haleakala	Pan-STARRS 1	·	1.1 km	MPC · JPL
580537	2015 BL_{578}	—	January 23, 2015	Haleakala	Pan-STARRS 1	·	850 m	MPC · JPL
580538	2015 BG_{582}	—	January 20, 2015	Mount Lemmon	Mount Lemmon Survey	·	1.1 km	MPC · JPL
580539	2015 BC_{583}	—	January 19, 2015	Mount Lemmon	Mount Lemmon Survey	·	2.3 km	MPC · JPL
580540	2015 BL_{592}	—	January 23, 2015	Haleakala	Pan-STARRS 1	·	1.2 km	MPC · JPL
580541	2015 BT_{594}	—	January 20, 2015	Haleakala	Pan-STARRS 1	·	2.3 km	MPC · JPL
580542	2015 BZ_{594}	—	January 17, 2015	Mount Lemmon	Mount Lemmon Survey	·	1.5 km	MPC · JPL
580543	2015 BS_{595}	—	January 22, 2015	Haleakala	Pan-STARRS 1	·	2.1 km	MPC · JPL
580544	2015 BG_{596}	—	January 17, 2015	Haleakala	Pan-STARRS 1	·	1.2 km	MPC · JPL
580545	2015 BW_{596}	—	January 22, 2015	Haleakala	Pan-STARRS 1	·	1.1 km	MPC · JPL
580546	2015 BT_{597}	—	January 16, 2015	Haleakala	Pan-STARRS 1	·	1.3 km	MPC · JPL
580547	2015 BO_{598}	—	January 22, 2015	Haleakala	Pan-STARRS 1	·	1.5 km	MPC · JPL
580548	2015 BA_{599}	—	October 14, 2012	ESA OGS	ESA OGS	MRX	830 m	MPC · JPL
580549	2015 BL_{602}	—	January 19, 2015	Mount Lemmon	Mount Lemmon Survey	·	1.3 km	MPC · JPL
580550	2015 BM_{602}	—	January 19, 2015	Haleakala	Pan-STARRS 1	·	1.3 km	MPC · JPL
580551	2015 BY_{604}	—	January 22, 2015	Haleakala	Pan-STARRS 1	·	1.2 km	MPC · JPL
580552	2015 BW_{606}	—	January 20, 2015	Haleakala	Pan-STARRS 1	·	2.0 km	MPC · JPL
580553	2015 BX_{615}	—	January 17, 2015	Haleakala	Pan-STARRS 1	·	2.3 km	MPC · JPL
580554	2015 BY_{615}	—	January 23, 2015	Haleakala	Pan-STARRS 1	·	1.8 km	MPC · JPL
580555	2015 BG_{617}	—	January 29, 2015	Haleakala	Pan-STARRS 1	·	1.0 km	MPC · JPL
580556	2015 BK_{617}	—	January 23, 2015	Haleakala	Pan-STARRS 1	·	1.6 km	MPC · JPL
580557	2015 CJ_{2}	—	December 16, 2014	Haleakala	Pan-STARRS 1	H	390 m	MPC · JPL
580558	2015 CR_{2}	—	December 14, 2007	Mount Lemmon	Mount Lemmon Survey	·	590 m	MPC · JPL
580559	2015 CL_{5}	—	March 30, 2008	Kitt Peak	Spacewatch	NYS	890 m	MPC · JPL
580560	2015 CN_{6}	—	February 13, 2010	Catalina	CSS	H	500 m	MPC · JPL
580561	2015 CS_{6}	—	August 24, 2003	Cerro Tololo	Deep Ecliptic Survey	·	1.7 km	MPC · JPL
580562	2015 CJ_{8}	—	March 26, 2007	Mount Lemmon	Mount Lemmon Survey	·	1.2 km	MPC · JPL
580563	2015 CN_{8}	—	September 14, 2013	Kitt Peak	Spacewatch	·	1.2 km	MPC · JPL
580564	2015 CC_{9}	—	September 9, 2008	Mount Lemmon	Mount Lemmon Survey	·	1.4 km	MPC · JPL
580565	2015 CD_{11}	—	January 20, 2015	Haleakala	Pan-STARRS 1	·	1.5 km	MPC · JPL
580566	2015 CT_{12}	—	January 20, 2015	Haleakala	Pan-STARRS 1	H	360 m	MPC · JPL
580567	2015 CD_{13}	—	August 23, 2003	Palomar	NEAT	H	500 m	MPC · JPL
580568	2015 CL_{14}	—	March 26, 2011	Siding Spring	SSS	·	2.0 km	MPC · JPL
580569	2015 CY_{14}	—	December 27, 2006	Mount Lemmon	Mount Lemmon Survey	3:2	3.7 km	MPC · JPL
580570	2015 CF_{16}	—	November 28, 2014	Haleakala	Pan-STARRS 1	HNS	1.1 km	MPC · JPL
580571	2015 CM_{17}	—	February 5, 2011	Catalina	CSS	·	1.6 km	MPC · JPL
580572	2015 CJ_{20}	—	December 26, 2014	Haleakala	Pan-STARRS 1	·	1.3 km	MPC · JPL
580573	2015 CM_{21}	—	January 9, 2006	Kitt Peak	Spacewatch	·	1.3 km	MPC · JPL
580574	2015 CE_{25}	—	January 31, 2015	Haleakala	Pan-STARRS 1	·	1.7 km	MPC · JPL
580575	2015 CK_{25}	—	December 2, 2005	Catalina	CSS	·	2.3 km	MPC · JPL
580576	2015 CM_{25}	—	January 21, 2015	Haleakala	Pan-STARRS 1	·	1.3 km	MPC · JPL
580577	2015 CA_{27}	—	January 22, 2006	Mount Lemmon	Mount Lemmon Survey	·	1.3 km	MPC · JPL
580578	2015 CJ_{27}	—	January 20, 2015	Haleakala	Pan-STARRS 1	·	1.5 km	MPC · JPL
580579	2015 CL_{27}	—	November 7, 2005	Mauna Kea	A. Boattini	·	1.7 km	MPC · JPL
580580	2015 CQ_{29}	—	April 5, 2011	Mount Lemmon	Mount Lemmon Survey	·	1.4 km	MPC · JPL
580581	2015 CZ_{29}	—	October 2, 2013	Haleakala	Pan-STARRS 1	·	960 m	MPC · JPL
580582	2015 CZ_{30}	—	January 17, 2015	Mount Lemmon	Mount Lemmon Survey	·	1.7 km	MPC · JPL
580583	2015 CK_{33}	—	July 22, 2004	Mauna Kea	Veillet, C.	EUN	1.1 km	MPC · JPL
580584	2015 CT_{33}	—	August 27, 2005	Palomar	NEAT	·	1.5 km	MPC · JPL
580585	2015 CW_{33}	—	October 24, 2005	Palomar	NEAT	·	1.5 km	MPC · JPL
580586	2015 CY_{33}	—	June 3, 2008	Mount Lemmon	Mount Lemmon Survey	·	1.6 km	MPC · JPL
580587	2015 CP_{34}	—	November 21, 2014	Haleakala	Pan-STARRS 1	·	1.1 km	MPC · JPL
580588	2015 CT_{34}	—	November 23, 2014	Haleakala	Pan-STARRS 1	H	370 m	MPC · JPL
580589	2015 CU_{35}	—	January 24, 2011	Mount Lemmon	Mount Lemmon Survey	·	1.1 km	MPC · JPL
580590	2015 CW_{35}	—	January 24, 2015	Haleakala	Pan-STARRS 1	HNS	850 m	MPC · JPL
580591	2015 CU_{36}	—	January 27, 2015	Haleakala	Pan-STARRS 1	·	1.6 km	MPC · JPL
580592	2015 CU_{38}	—	February 25, 2011	Kitt Peak	Spacewatch	·	1.4 km	MPC · JPL
580593	2015 CT_{39}	—	October 20, 2003	Kitt Peak	Spacewatch	·	3.1 km	MPC · JPL
580594	2015 CD_{40}	—	November 3, 2004	Kitt Peak	Spacewatch	GEF	1.5 km	MPC · JPL
580595	2015 CE_{40}	—	January 27, 2006	Catalina	CSS	·	1.7 km	MPC · JPL
580596	2015 CZ_{40}	—	February 28, 2012	Haleakala	Pan-STARRS 1	·	690 m	MPC · JPL
580597	2015 CT_{41}	—	February 5, 2011	Catalina	CSS	·	1.4 km	MPC · JPL
580598	2015 CW_{41}	—	January 30, 2008	Mount Lemmon	Mount Lemmon Survey	·	600 m	MPC · JPL
580599	2015 CK_{42}	—	April 30, 2011	Mount Lemmon	Mount Lemmon Survey	·	1.5 km	MPC · JPL
580600	2015 CP_{42}	—	March 5, 2006	Kitt Peak	Spacewatch	MRX	810 m	MPC · JPL

== 580601–580700 ==
back to top

Designation			Discovery			Properties		Ref
Permanent	Provisional	Named after	Date	Site	Discoverer(s)	Category	Diam.	Ref
580601	2015 CW_{43}	—	September 2, 2013	Mount Lemmon	Mount Lemmon Survey	BRG	1.1 km	MPC · JPL
580602	2015 CZ_{44}	—	June 8, 2011	Mount Lemmon	Mount Lemmon Survey	·	1.7 km	MPC · JPL
580603	2015 CO_{47}	—	September 23, 2008	Mount Lemmon	Mount Lemmon Survey	HNS	1.0 km	MPC · JPL
580604	2015 CD_{49}	—	February 11, 2002	Kitt Peak	Spacewatch	·	2.0 km	MPC · JPL
580605	2015 CQ_{49}	—	February 17, 2004	Kitt Peak	Spacewatch	·	2.6 km	MPC · JPL
580606	2015 CR_{49}	—	February 15, 2015	Haleakala	Pan-STARRS 1	·	1.6 km	MPC · JPL
580607	2015 CE_{52}	—	August 26, 2012	Charleston	R. Holmes	·	1.5 km	MPC · JPL
580608	2015 CK_{54}	—	February 15, 2015	Haleakala	Pan-STARRS 1	·	2.8 km	MPC · JPL
580609	2015 CN_{54}	—	December 22, 2008	Kitt Peak	Spacewatch	·	2.1 km	MPC · JPL
580610	2015 CQ_{54}	—	January 19, 2015	Haleakala	Pan-STARRS 1	BRG	1.2 km	MPC · JPL
580611	2015 CY_{54}	—	October 1, 2002	Anderson Mesa	LONEOS	EOS	2.2 km	MPC · JPL
580612	2015 CL_{55}	—	November 1, 2008	Mount Lemmon	Mount Lemmon Survey	KOR	1.2 km	MPC · JPL
580613	2015 CE_{56}	—	February 11, 2004	Palomar	NEAT	·	2.2 km	MPC · JPL
580614	2015 CH_{57}	—	September 21, 2003	Kitt Peak	Spacewatch	·	2.3 km	MPC · JPL
580615	2015 CK_{58}	—	March 3, 2009	Catalina	CSS	TIR	3.7 km	MPC · JPL
580616	2015 CC_{59}	—	February 14, 2002	Kitt Peak	Spacewatch	EUN	890 m	MPC · JPL
580617	2015 CE_{59}	—	September 26, 2013	Mount Lemmon	Mount Lemmon Survey	HNS	1.1 km	MPC · JPL
580618	2015 CS_{59}	—	October 3, 2013	Haleakala	Pan-STARRS 1	·	1.1 km	MPC · JPL
580619 Harangiszabolcs	2015 CF_{61}	Harangiszabolcs	October 1, 2011	Piszkéstető	K. Sárneczky	H	390 m	MPC · JPL
580620	2015 CO_{61}	—	March 14, 2010	Kitt Peak	Spacewatch	H	580 m	MPC · JPL
580621	2015 CZ_{61}	—	October 13, 1999	Apache Point	SDSS Collaboration	EUN	1.5 km	MPC · JPL
580622	2015 CO_{62}	—	February 13, 2015	Mount Lemmon	Mount Lemmon Survey	H	380 m	MPC · JPL
580623	2015 CY_{62}	—	February 15, 2015	Haleakala	Pan-STARRS 1	EOS	1.6 km	MPC · JPL
580624	2015 CD_{63}	—	March 11, 2005	Kitt Peak	Spacewatch	EOS	2.1 km	MPC · JPL
580625	2015 CE_{63}	—	April 22, 2002	Kitt Peak	Spacewatch	·	1.9 km	MPC · JPL
580626	2015 CS_{65}	—	July 30, 2008	Mount Lemmon	Mount Lemmon Survey	·	1.8 km	MPC · JPL
580627	2015 CL_{66}	—	December 8, 2010	Mount Lemmon	Mount Lemmon Survey	V	540 m	MPC · JPL
580628	2015 CH_{67}	—	March 16, 2007	Kitt Peak	Spacewatch	·	1.4 km	MPC · JPL
580629	2015 CL_{68}	—	April 2, 2011	Mount Lemmon	Mount Lemmon Survey	·	1.1 km	MPC · JPL
580630	2015 CE_{69}	—	January 17, 2015	Haleakala	Pan-STARRS 1	·	1.2 km	MPC · JPL
580631	2015 CN_{70}	—	November 9, 2013	Haleakala	Pan-STARRS 1	·	1.5 km	MPC · JPL
580632	2015 CQ_{70}	—	November 3, 2004	Palomar	NEAT	·	2.1 km	MPC · JPL
580633	2015 CS_{72}	—	February 14, 2015	Mount Lemmon	Mount Lemmon Survey	·	1.6 km	MPC · JPL
580634	2015 CT_{72}	—	February 14, 2015	Mount Lemmon	Mount Lemmon Survey	·	1.4 km	MPC · JPL
580635	2015 CG_{73}	—	February 13, 2015	Mount Lemmon	Mount Lemmon Survey	V	410 m	MPC · JPL
580636	2015 CY_{73}	—	November 10, 2013	Mount Lemmon	Mount Lemmon Survey	·	1.8 km	MPC · JPL
580637	2015 DV	—	November 15, 2011	Haleakala	Pan-STARRS 1	H	600 m	MPC · JPL
580638	2015 DA_{1}	—	September 20, 2011	Haleakala	Pan-STARRS 1	H	360 m	MPC · JPL
580639	2015 DJ_{2}	—	April 16, 2007	Mount Lemmon	Mount Lemmon Survey	·	1.4 km	MPC · JPL
580640	2015 DX_{2}	—	September 5, 2008	Kitt Peak	Spacewatch	HOF	2.3 km	MPC · JPL
580641	2015 DJ_{3}	—	January 4, 2011	Mount Lemmon	Mount Lemmon Survey	·	1.2 km	MPC · JPL
580642	2015 DU_{3}	—	March 26, 2007	Mount Lemmon	Mount Lemmon Survey	MIS	1.9 km	MPC · JPL
580643	2015 DK_{4}	—	November 25, 2005	Kitt Peak	Spacewatch	·	1.4 km	MPC · JPL
580644	2015 DA_{5}	—	November 28, 2006	Kitt Peak	Spacewatch	·	1.2 km	MPC · JPL
580645	2015 DQ_{5}	—	October 17, 2010	Mount Lemmon	Mount Lemmon Survey	·	600 m	MPC · JPL
580646	2015 DT_{5}	—	October 3, 2013	Haleakala	Pan-STARRS 1	KOR	1.1 km	MPC · JPL
580647	2015 DD_{7}	—	January 14, 2011	Kitt Peak	Spacewatch	·	850 m	MPC · JPL
580648	2015 DH_{7}	—	April 1, 2005	Kitt Peak	Spacewatch	·	2.1 km	MPC · JPL
580649	2015 DS_{7}	—	January 16, 2015	Haleakala	Pan-STARRS 1	·	3.0 km	MPC · JPL
580650	2015 DV_{7}	—	February 28, 2012	Haleakala	Pan-STARRS 1	·	700 m	MPC · JPL
580651	2015 DC_{8}	—	January 22, 2006	Mount Lemmon	Mount Lemmon Survey	·	1.7 km	MPC · JPL
580652	2015 DX_{13}	—	March 11, 2007	Mount Lemmon	Mount Lemmon Survey	·	1.6 km	MPC · JPL
580653	2015 DW_{14}	—	October 4, 2006	Mount Lemmon	Mount Lemmon Survey	NYS	960 m	MPC · JPL
580654	2015 DE_{15}	—	March 4, 2011	Mount Lemmon	Mount Lemmon Survey	·	1.1 km	MPC · JPL
580655	2015 DU_{15}	—	April 21, 2012	Mount Lemmon	Mount Lemmon Survey	·	790 m	MPC · JPL
580656	2015 DG_{16}	—	February 4, 2005	Kitt Peak	Spacewatch	·	1.8 km	MPC · JPL
580657	2015 DO_{17}	—	September 4, 2008	Kitt Peak	Spacewatch	NEM	1.9 km	MPC · JPL
580658	2015 DA_{19}	—	October 10, 2004	Kitt Peak	Deep Ecliptic Survey	·	840 m	MPC · JPL
580659	2015 DX_{19}	—	October 24, 2013	Mount Lemmon	Mount Lemmon Survey	·	540 m	MPC · JPL
580660	2015 DL_{20}	—	January 29, 2015	Haleakala	Pan-STARRS 1	·	1.7 km	MPC · JPL
580661	2015 DS_{20}	—	April 2, 2011	Mount Lemmon	Mount Lemmon Survey	·	1.4 km	MPC · JPL
580662	2015 DO_{22}	—	November 8, 2013	Mount Lemmon	Mount Lemmon Survey	·	1.6 km	MPC · JPL
580663	2015 DQ_{22}	—	May 28, 2012	Mount Lemmon	Mount Lemmon Survey	·	1.7 km	MPC · JPL
580664	2015 DY_{23}	—	January 21, 2015	Haleakala	Pan-STARRS 1	·	1.9 km	MPC · JPL
580665	2015 DJ_{24}	—	October 12, 2009	Mount Lemmon	Mount Lemmon Survey	·	1.1 km	MPC · JPL
580666	2015 DK_{24}	—	August 15, 2009	Kitt Peak	Spacewatch	·	1.2 km	MPC · JPL
580667	2015 DC_{25}	—	February 10, 2015	Mount Lemmon	Mount Lemmon Survey	·	950 m	MPC · JPL
580668	2015 DD_{26}	—	March 5, 2006	Mount Lemmon	Mount Lemmon Survey	·	1.6 km	MPC · JPL
580669	2015 DJ_{26}	—	November 9, 2013	Haleakala	Pan-STARRS 1	AGN	860 m	MPC · JPL
580670	2015 DL_{26}	—	February 16, 2015	Haleakala	Pan-STARRS 1	·	1.2 km	MPC · JPL
580671	2015 DY_{26}	—	October 20, 2008	Mount Lemmon	Mount Lemmon Survey	·	1.4 km	MPC · JPL
580672	2015 DD_{28}	—	February 16, 2015	Haleakala	Pan-STARRS 1	WIT	700 m	MPC · JPL
580673	2015 DC_{29}	—	February 16, 2015	Haleakala	Pan-STARRS 1	·	1.8 km	MPC · JPL
580674	2015 DH_{29}	—	January 27, 2015	Haleakala	Pan-STARRS 1	HNS	790 m	MPC · JPL
580675	2015 DM_{29}	—	November 1, 2013	Mount Lemmon	Mount Lemmon Survey	·	680 m	MPC · JPL
580676	2015 DU_{29}	—	February 16, 2015	Haleakala	Pan-STARRS 1	·	650 m	MPC · JPL
580677	2015 DE_{31}	—	October 8, 2013	Kitt Peak	Spacewatch	·	1.2 km	MPC · JPL
580678	2015 DP_{31}	—	April 30, 2008	Kitt Peak	Spacewatch	·	790 m	MPC · JPL
580679	2015 DW_{31}	—	October 2, 2008	Mount Lemmon	Mount Lemmon Survey	·	1.6 km	MPC · JPL
580680	2015 DW_{32}	—	October 8, 2008	Kitt Peak	Spacewatch	AGN	1.4 km	MPC · JPL
580681	2015 DF_{33}	—	December 3, 2008	Mount Lemmon	Mount Lemmon Survey	·	1.9 km	MPC · JPL
580682	2015 DJ_{33}	—	February 16, 2015	Haleakala	Pan-STARRS 1	·	2.0 km	MPC · JPL
580683	2015 DR_{33}	—	January 21, 2015	Haleakala	Pan-STARRS 1	·	1.8 km	MPC · JPL
580684	2015 DA_{34}	—	January 21, 2015	Haleakala	Pan-STARRS 1	·	1.5 km	MPC · JPL
580685	2015 DD_{35}	—	September 13, 2013	Catalina	CSS	EUN	1.3 km	MPC · JPL
580686	2015 DJ_{35}	—	August 26, 2012	Kitt Peak	Spacewatch	·	1.7 km	MPC · JPL
580687	2015 DP_{35}	—	October 20, 2006	Kitt Peak	Deep Ecliptic Survey	·	1.3 km	MPC · JPL
580688	2015 DT_{35}	—	September 18, 2003	Kitt Peak	Spacewatch	·	1.8 km	MPC · JPL
580689	2015 DV_{35}	—	August 25, 2003	Cerro Tololo	Deep Ecliptic Survey	GEF	1.5 km	MPC · JPL
580690	2015 DR_{36}	—	February 16, 2015	Haleakala	Pan-STARRS 1	·	1.5 km	MPC · JPL
580691	2015 DE_{37}	—	October 31, 2008	Catalina	CSS	·	2.1 km	MPC · JPL
580692	2015 DL_{37}	—	January 21, 2015	Haleakala	Pan-STARRS 1	·	1.1 km	MPC · JPL
580693	2015 DS_{38}	—	September 26, 2008	Kitt Peak	Spacewatch	MRX	880 m	MPC · JPL
580694	2015 DC_{40}	—	May 1, 2011	Marly	P. Kocher	·	1.9 km	MPC · JPL
580695	2015 DT_{42}	—	January 7, 2010	Kitt Peak	Spacewatch	·	1.7 km	MPC · JPL
580696	2015 DR_{43}	—	March 4, 2006	Kitt Peak	Spacewatch	·	1.5 km	MPC · JPL
580697	2015 DU_{43}	—	June 15, 2009	Mount Lemmon	Mount Lemmon Survey	·	720 m	MPC · JPL
580698	2015 DW_{43}	—	November 9, 2013	Haleakala	Pan-STARRS 1	·	1.2 km	MPC · JPL
580699	2015 DD_{44}	—	January 29, 2009	Kitt Peak	Spacewatch	·	2.4 km	MPC · JPL
580700	2015 DT_{44}	—	April 20, 2012	Mount Lemmon	Mount Lemmon Survey	·	590 m	MPC · JPL

== 580701–580800 ==
back to top

Designation			Discovery			Properties		Ref
Permanent	Provisional	Named after	Date	Site	Discoverer(s)	Category	Diam.	Ref
580701	2015 DP_{45}	—	January 29, 2015	Haleakala	Pan-STARRS 1	·	1.5 km	MPC · JPL
580702	2015 DT_{46}	—	October 27, 2005	Mount Lemmon	Mount Lemmon Survey	·	990 m	MPC · JPL
580703	2015 DL_{47}	—	November 27, 2013	Haleakala	Pan-STARRS 1	WIT	820 m	MPC · JPL
580704	2015 DU_{48}	—	January 27, 2015	Haleakala	Pan-STARRS 1	AEO	1.0 km	MPC · JPL
580705	2015 DW_{48}	—	November 24, 2009	Kitt Peak	Spacewatch	·	1.5 km	MPC · JPL
580706	2015 DK_{49}	—	January 12, 2010	Mount Lemmon	Mount Lemmon Survey	·	1.9 km	MPC · JPL
580707	2015 DK_{50}	—	January 29, 2015	Haleakala	Pan-STARRS 1	·	1.7 km	MPC · JPL
580708	2015 DX_{51}	—	November 17, 2009	Mount Lemmon	Mount Lemmon Survey	·	1.8 km	MPC · JPL
580709	2015 DC_{52}	—	October 14, 2013	Kitt Peak	Spacewatch	·	1.1 km	MPC · JPL
580710	2015 DQ_{52}	—	February 16, 2015	Haleakala	Pan-STARRS 1	·	1.7 km	MPC · JPL
580711	2015 DU_{53}	—	January 21, 2015	Haleakala	Pan-STARRS 1	H	330 m	MPC · JPL
580712	2015 DS_{54}	—	December 26, 2014	Haleakala	Pan-STARRS 1	·	1.6 km	MPC · JPL
580713	2015 DF_{56}	—	August 24, 2000	Socorro	LINEAR	·	1.4 km	MPC · JPL
580714	2015 DZ_{56}	—	January 11, 2010	Kitt Peak	Spacewatch	·	1.6 km	MPC · JPL
580715	2015 DW_{58}	—	October 25, 2008	Kitt Peak	Spacewatch	·	1.8 km	MPC · JPL
580716	2015 DZ_{61}	—	August 14, 2012	Haleakala	Pan-STARRS 1	·	1.3 km	MPC · JPL
580717	2015 DK_{62}	—	January 22, 2015	Haleakala	Pan-STARRS 1	·	1.7 km	MPC · JPL
580718	2015 DS_{63}	—	March 2, 2011	Mount Lemmon	Mount Lemmon Survey	·	1.1 km	MPC · JPL
580719	2015 DY_{63}	—	March 3, 2006	Mount Nyukasa	Japan Aerospace Exploration Agency	·	2.0 km	MPC · JPL
580720	2015 DL_{66}	—	October 20, 2008	Kitt Peak	Spacewatch	·	1.6 km	MPC · JPL
580721	2015 DP_{67}	—	May 21, 2011	Mount Lemmon	Mount Lemmon Survey	KOR	1.3 km	MPC · JPL
580722	2015 DL_{68}	—	May 6, 2011	Mount Lemmon	Mount Lemmon Survey	MRX	760 m	MPC · JPL
580723	2015 DA_{70}	—	January 22, 2015	Haleakala	Pan-STARRS 1	·	1.4 km	MPC · JPL
580724	2015 DK_{71}	—	February 16, 2015	Haleakala	Pan-STARRS 1	·	1.6 km	MPC · JPL
580725	2015 DB_{72}	—	February 16, 2015	Haleakala	Pan-STARRS 1	·	1.6 km	MPC · JPL
580726	2015 DM_{72}	—	February 25, 2006	Mount Lemmon	Mount Lemmon Survey	HOF	2.2 km	MPC · JPL
580727	2015 DX_{72}	—	January 30, 2006	Kitt Peak	Spacewatch	·	1.5 km	MPC · JPL
580728	2015 DD_{73}	—	August 26, 2012	Haleakala	Pan-STARRS 1	·	1.6 km	MPC · JPL
580729	2015 DE_{73}	—	September 6, 2008	Catalina	CSS	·	1.7 km	MPC · JPL
580730	2015 DQ_{73}	—	January 30, 2006	Kitt Peak	Spacewatch	PAD	1.4 km	MPC · JPL
580731	2015 DW_{73}	—	March 8, 2005	Mount Lemmon	Mount Lemmon Survey	·	1.3 km	MPC · JPL
580732	2015 DT_{74}	—	January 9, 2007	Mount Lemmon	Mount Lemmon Survey	·	1.0 km	MPC · JPL
580733	2015 DR_{75}	—	January 16, 2005	Mauna Kea	Veillet, C.	KOR	1.1 km	MPC · JPL
580734	2015 DQ_{76}	—	November 14, 2006	Kitt Peak	Spacewatch	MAS	500 m	MPC · JPL
580735	2015 DU_{78}	—	December 25, 2005	Kitt Peak	Spacewatch	·	1.3 km	MPC · JPL
580736	2015 DS_{79}	—	October 5, 2004	Kitt Peak	Spacewatch	(29841)	1.3 km	MPC · JPL
580737	2015 DF_{81}	—	April 14, 2011	Mount Lemmon	Mount Lemmon Survey	·	1.8 km	MPC · JPL
580738	2015 DJ_{82}	—	March 17, 2005	Mount Lemmon	Mount Lemmon Survey	·	1.7 km	MPC · JPL
580739	2015 DH_{83}	—	September 12, 2007	Kitt Peak	Spacewatch	KOR	1.4 km	MPC · JPL
580740	2015 DW_{83}	—	February 10, 2015	Mount Lemmon	Mount Lemmon Survey	·	1.5 km	MPC · JPL
580741	2015 DB_{84}	—	January 30, 2006	Kitt Peak	Spacewatch	PAD	1.4 km	MPC · JPL
580742	2015 DJ_{85}	—	January 22, 2006	Mount Lemmon	Mount Lemmon Survey	·	1.5 km	MPC · JPL
580743	2015 DQ_{87}	—	September 20, 2008	Kitt Peak	Spacewatch	·	1.4 km	MPC · JPL
580744	2015 DL_{88}	—	January 22, 2015	Haleakala	Pan-STARRS 1	KOR	1.1 km	MPC · JPL
580745	2015 DP_{88}	—	December 28, 2005	Kitt Peak	Spacewatch	·	1.1 km	MPC · JPL
580746	2015 DL_{89}	—	September 25, 2013	Mount Lemmon	Mount Lemmon Survey	·	1.0 km	MPC · JPL
580747	2015 DP_{91}	—	August 29, 2000	Socorro	LINEAR	·	1.3 km	MPC · JPL
580748	2015 DQ_{93}	—	October 21, 2003	Kitt Peak	Spacewatch	KOR	1.2 km	MPC · JPL
580749	2015 DZ_{93}	—	September 3, 2008	Kitt Peak	Spacewatch	WIT	1.0 km	MPC · JPL
580750	2015 DE_{95}	—	August 24, 2007	Kitt Peak	Spacewatch	·	2.7 km	MPC · JPL
580751	2015 DS_{96}	—	September 13, 2012	Mount Lemmon	Mount Lemmon Survey	·	2.7 km	MPC · JPL
580752	2015 DE_{97}	—	September 23, 2008	Mount Lemmon	Mount Lemmon Survey	·	1.9 km	MPC · JPL
580753	2015 DB_{98}	—	October 2, 2008	Mount Lemmon	Mount Lemmon Survey	PAD	1.4 km	MPC · JPL
580754	2015 DG_{98}	—	March 18, 2010	Mount Lemmon	Mount Lemmon Survey	·	1.5 km	MPC · JPL
580755	2015 DK_{99}	—	January 31, 2006	Kitt Peak	Spacewatch	·	1.1 km	MPC · JPL
580756	2015 DE_{100}	—	September 26, 2009	Kitt Peak	Spacewatch	·	800 m	MPC · JPL
580757	2015 DU_{100}	—	March 24, 2011	Catalina	CSS	·	1.7 km	MPC · JPL
580758	2015 DA_{102}	—	March 13, 2011	Kitt Peak	Spacewatch	·	1.8 km	MPC · JPL
580759	2015 DG_{102}	—	March 26, 2011	Kitt Peak	Spacewatch	DOR	2.1 km	MPC · JPL
580760	2015 DB_{104}	—	February 17, 2015	Haleakala	Pan-STARRS 1	BRA	1.2 km	MPC · JPL
580761	2015 DE_{105}	—	March 9, 2011	Mount Lemmon	Mount Lemmon Survey	·	1.2 km	MPC · JPL
580762	2015 DX_{106}	—	March 29, 2011	Kitt Peak	Spacewatch	·	1.7 km	MPC · JPL
580763	2015 DK_{107}	—	September 5, 2013	Kitt Peak	Spacewatch	·	1.5 km	MPC · JPL
580764	2015 DN_{107}	—	May 27, 2012	Mount Lemmon	Mount Lemmon Survey	·	1.2 km	MPC · JPL
580765	2015 DG_{108}	—	February 14, 2015	Catalina	CSS	·	2.0 km	MPC · JPL
580766	2015 DH_{108}	—	January 27, 2006	Mount Lemmon	Mount Lemmon Survey	·	1.8 km	MPC · JPL
580767	2015 DG_{113}	—	May 21, 2012	Mount Lemmon	Mount Lemmon Survey	ADE	2.0 km	MPC · JPL
580768	2015 DJ_{113}	—	January 21, 2015	Mount Lemmon	Mount Lemmon Survey	·	1.6 km	MPC · JPL
580769	2015 DY_{113}	—	January 23, 2015	Haleakala	Pan-STARRS 1	·	1.8 km	MPC · JPL
580770	2015 DB_{114}	—	January 23, 2015	Haleakala	Pan-STARRS 1	·	1.9 km	MPC · JPL
580771	2015 DP_{114}	—	January 25, 2015	Haleakala	Pan-STARRS 1	·	1.5 km	MPC · JPL
580772	2015 DT_{116}	—	May 21, 2012	Mount Lemmon	Mount Lemmon Survey	·	1.4 km	MPC · JPL
580773	2015 DD_{118}	—	December 29, 2014	Haleakala	Pan-STARRS 1	WIT	900 m	MPC · JPL
580774	2015 DH_{119}	—	December 10, 2004	Kitt Peak	Spacewatch	·	2.1 km	MPC · JPL
580775	2015 DE_{120}	—	January 8, 2010	Kitt Peak	Spacewatch	·	2.4 km	MPC · JPL
580776	2015 DB_{121}	—	October 29, 2000	Kitt Peak	Spacewatch	·	1.6 km	MPC · JPL
580777	2015 DL_{121}	—	December 29, 2014	Haleakala	Pan-STARRS 1	·	1.5 km	MPC · JPL
580778	2015 DQ_{121}	—	August 26, 2012	Catalina	CSS	·	2.2 km	MPC · JPL
580779	2015 DY_{121}	—	October 8, 2012	Haleakala	Pan-STARRS 1	BRA	1.5 km	MPC · JPL
580780	2015 DP_{122}	—	March 9, 2005	Catalina	CSS	·	3.6 km	MPC · JPL
580781	2015 DE_{123}	—	April 28, 2011	Kitt Peak	Spacewatch	·	1.4 km	MPC · JPL
580782	2015 DV_{123}	—	November 18, 2009	Mount Lemmon	Mount Lemmon Survey	·	1.7 km	MPC · JPL
580783	2015 DX_{123}	—	September 14, 2013	Haleakala	Pan-STARRS 1	RAF	730 m	MPC · JPL
580784	2015 DT_{125}	—	November 4, 2013	Haleakala	Pan-STARRS 1	GEF	1.1 km	MPC · JPL
580785	2015 DU_{127}	—	April 28, 2011	Kitt Peak	Spacewatch	·	2.0 km	MPC · JPL
580786	2015 DT_{129}	—	December 29, 2014	Haleakala	Pan-STARRS 1	·	1.7 km	MPC · JPL
580787	2015 DF_{130}	—	December 29, 2014	Haleakala	Pan-STARRS 1	·	1.5 km	MPC · JPL
580788	2015 DS_{130}	—	December 26, 2009	Kitt Peak	Spacewatch	·	1.7 km	MPC · JPL
580789	2015 DA_{132}	—	November 9, 2013	Haleakala	Pan-STARRS 1	GEF	1.1 km	MPC · JPL
580790	2015 DN_{132}	—	February 17, 2015	Haleakala	Pan-STARRS 1	·	2.0 km	MPC · JPL
580791	2015 DP_{132}	—	February 17, 2015	Haleakala	Pan-STARRS 1	·	1.9 km	MPC · JPL
580792	2015 DO_{137}	—	February 17, 2015	Haleakala	Pan-STARRS 1	·	2.8 km	MPC · JPL
580793	2015 DG_{141}	—	October 25, 2005	Kitt Peak	Spacewatch	·	1.6 km	MPC · JPL
580794	2015 DD_{143}	—	January 17, 2015	Mount Lemmon	Mount Lemmon Survey	·	1.7 km	MPC · JPL
580795	2015 DK_{143}	—	January 24, 2003	La Silla	A. Boattini, Hainaut, O.	·	1.7 km	MPC · JPL
580796	2015 DF_{145}	—	November 30, 2005	Mount Lemmon	Mount Lemmon Survey	·	2.0 km	MPC · JPL
580797	2015 DK_{145}	—	October 1, 2005	Anderson Mesa	LONEOS	·	1.4 km	MPC · JPL
580798	2015 DD_{147}	—	October 10, 2008	Mount Lemmon	Mount Lemmon Survey	GEF	1.5 km	MPC · JPL
580799	2015 DF_{148}	—	November 21, 2009	Kitt Peak	Spacewatch	·	1.7 km	MPC · JPL
580800	2015 DB_{149}	—	December 5, 2005	Kitt Peak	Spacewatch	(5)	1.6 km	MPC · JPL

== 580801–580900 ==
back to top

Designation			Discovery			Properties		Ref
Permanent	Provisional	Named after	Date	Site	Discoverer(s)	Category	Diam.	Ref
580801	2015 DM_{151}	—	February 18, 2015	Mount Lemmon	Mount Lemmon Survey	·	2.7 km	MPC · JPL
580802	2015 DN_{152}	—	December 29, 2013	Haleakala	Pan-STARRS 1	EOS	2.0 km	MPC · JPL
580803	2015 DW_{153}	—	October 16, 2003	Kitt Peak	Spacewatch	·	2.1 km	MPC · JPL
580804	2015 DV_{154}	—	September 28, 2013	Mount Lemmon	Mount Lemmon Survey	AEO	1.2 km	MPC · JPL
580805	2015 DG_{155}	—	November 26, 2014	Haleakala	Pan-STARRS 1	H	470 m	MPC · JPL
580806	2015 DQ_{155}	—	December 15, 2006	Mount Lemmon	Mount Lemmon Survey	H	560 m	MPC · JPL
580807	2015 DT_{155}	—	November 28, 2006	Mount Lemmon	Mount Lemmon Survey	H	550 m	MPC · JPL
580808	2015 DE_{156}	—	April 9, 2008	Kitt Peak	Spacewatch	·	750 m	MPC · JPL
580809	2015 DX_{156}	—	March 23, 2003	Apache Point	SDSS Collaboration	EUN	1.1 km	MPC · JPL
580810	2015 DM_{157}	—	March 11, 2011	Mount Lemmon	Mount Lemmon Survey	·	1.6 km	MPC · JPL
580811	2015 DG_{158}	—	October 29, 2009	Kitt Peak	Spacewatch	EUN	1.2 km	MPC · JPL
580812	2015 DJ_{158}	—	September 23, 2008	Kitt Peak	Spacewatch	·	1.8 km	MPC · JPL
580813	2015 DL_{159}	—	April 28, 2011	Haleakala	Pan-STARRS 1	·	2.1 km	MPC · JPL
580814	2015 DU_{159}	—	March 2, 2011	Kitt Peak	Spacewatch	·	2.0 km	MPC · JPL
580815	2015 DJ_{160}	—	November 29, 2013	Haleakala	Pan-STARRS 1	·	2.4 km	MPC · JPL
580816	2015 DQ_{161}	—	January 27, 2015	Haleakala	Pan-STARRS 1	·	1.8 km	MPC · JPL
580817	2015 DJ_{162}	—	February 18, 2015	Haleakala	Pan-STARRS 1	·	880 m	MPC · JPL
580818	2015 DN_{163}	—	November 28, 2013	Mount Lemmon	Mount Lemmon Survey	·	1.4 km	MPC · JPL
580819	2015 DR_{163}	—	February 18, 2015	Haleakala	Pan-STARRS 1	EOS	1.6 km	MPC · JPL
580820	2015 DX_{164}	—	January 21, 2015	Haleakala	Pan-STARRS 1	·	1.8 km	MPC · JPL
580821	2015 DZ_{164}	—	September 29, 2003	Kitt Peak	Spacewatch	·	1.9 km	MPC · JPL
580822	2015 DW_{166}	—	May 23, 2006	Kitt Peak	Spacewatch	615	1.2 km	MPC · JPL
580823	2015 DA_{167}	—	October 14, 2007	Mount Lemmon	Mount Lemmon Survey	·	1.9 km	MPC · JPL
580824	2015 DV_{167}	—	October 8, 2012	Haleakala	Pan-STARRS 1	EOS	1.7 km	MPC · JPL
580825	2015 DD_{170}	—	October 30, 2005	Mount Lemmon	Mount Lemmon Survey	·	1.4 km	MPC · JPL
580826	2015 DO_{171}	—	December 7, 2001	Kitt Peak	Spacewatch	·	1.2 km	MPC · JPL
580827	2015 DD_{173}	—	March 11, 2011	Mount Lemmon	Mount Lemmon Survey	EUN	1.2 km	MPC · JPL
580828	2015 DK_{173}	—	January 23, 2015	Haleakala	Pan-STARRS 1	·	1.9 km	MPC · JPL
580829	2015 DL_{174}	—	January 16, 2015	Haleakala	Pan-STARRS 1	·	2.6 km	MPC · JPL
580830	2015 DR_{175}	—	August 30, 2005	Bergisch Gladbach	W. Bickel	·	3.1 km	MPC · JPL
580831	2015 DO_{177}	—	February 20, 2015	Haleakala	Pan-STARRS 1	H	450 m	MPC · JPL
580832	2015 DW_{179}	—	December 25, 2009	Kitt Peak	Spacewatch	(18466)	2.9 km	MPC · JPL
580833	2015 DH_{180}	—	September 6, 2008	Mount Lemmon	Mount Lemmon Survey	·	1.6 km	MPC · JPL
580834	2015 DM_{181}	—	October 5, 2004	Kitt Peak	Spacewatch	·	1.3 km	MPC · JPL
580835	2015 DR_{182}	—	January 12, 2010	Kitt Peak	Spacewatch	BRA	1.5 km	MPC · JPL
580836	2015 DD_{184}	—	February 20, 2015	Haleakala	Pan-STARRS 1	EOS	1.6 km	MPC · JPL
580837	2015 DA_{186}	—	October 11, 2012	Mount Lemmon	Mount Lemmon Survey	·	1.7 km	MPC · JPL
580838	2015 DK_{187}	—	October 25, 2013	Mount Lemmon	Mount Lemmon Survey	·	1.5 km	MPC · JPL
580839	2015 DG_{188}	—	November 1, 2013	Kitt Peak	Spacewatch	·	1.5 km	MPC · JPL
580840	2015 DN_{188}	—	January 27, 2015	Haleakala	Pan-STARRS 1	·	1.7 km	MPC · JPL
580841	2015 DK_{190}	—	May 26, 2011	Kitt Peak	Spacewatch	·	2.3 km	MPC · JPL
580842	2015 DQ_{193}	—	August 12, 2013	Haleakala	Pan-STARRS 1	·	1.3 km	MPC · JPL
580843	2015 DS_{193}	—	July 20, 2004	Siding Spring	SSS	·	2.2 km	MPC · JPL
580844	2015 DS_{196}	—	January 16, 2015	Haleakala	Pan-STARRS 1	·	2.4 km	MPC · JPL
580845	2015 DG_{199}	—	June 18, 2013	Mount Lemmon	Mount Lemmon Survey	H	540 m	MPC · JPL
580846	2015 DU_{199}	—	October 9, 2008	Mount Lemmon	Mount Lemmon Survey	·	680 m	MPC · JPL
580847	2015 DM_{200}	—	November 9, 2013	Mount Lemmon	Mount Lemmon Survey	·	1.1 km	MPC · JPL
580848	2015 DY_{200}	—	April 26, 2006	Cerro Tololo	Deep Ecliptic Survey	·	1.5 km	MPC · JPL
580849	2015 DS_{201}	—	April 22, 2011	Kitt Peak	Spacewatch	·	1.4 km	MPC · JPL
580850	2015 DA_{202}	—	December 4, 2008	Kitt Peak	Spacewatch	·	2.2 km	MPC · JPL
580851	2015 DG_{202}	—	September 14, 2007	Mauna Kea	P. A. Wiegert	EOS	1.4 km	MPC · JPL
580852	2015 DB_{203}	—	November 26, 2013	Mount Lemmon	Mount Lemmon Survey	·	1.5 km	MPC · JPL
580853	2015 DN_{203}	—	December 18, 2009	Mount Lemmon	Mount Lemmon Survey	·	2.2 km	MPC · JPL
580854	2015 DK_{207}	—	October 31, 2002	Apache Point	SDSS	·	1.6 km	MPC · JPL
580855	2015 DN_{209}	—	January 30, 2015	Haleakala	Pan-STARRS 1	·	1.9 km	MPC · JPL
580856	2015 DO_{212}	—	March 22, 2009	Catalina	CSS	·	3.6 km	MPC · JPL
580857	2015 DB_{213}	—	February 21, 2007	Mount Lemmon	Mount Lemmon Survey	PHO	820 m	MPC · JPL
580858	2015 DD_{214}	—	February 13, 2004	Palomar	NEAT	H	690 m	MPC · JPL
580859	2015 DF_{215}	—	October 12, 2009	Mount Lemmon	Mount Lemmon Survey	·	1.2 km	MPC · JPL
580860	2015 DT_{215}	—	October 26, 2008	Kitt Peak	Spacewatch	H	600 m	MPC · JPL
580861	2015 DU_{215}	—	February 24, 2015	Haleakala	Pan-STARRS 1	·	1.3 km	MPC · JPL
580862	2015 DZ_{217}	—	December 31, 2008	Kitt Peak	Spacewatch	·	1.9 km	MPC · JPL
580863	2015 DH_{219}	—	January 20, 2015	Haleakala	Pan-STARRS 1	·	1.5 km	MPC · JPL
580864	2015 DT_{219}	—	December 6, 2013	Haleakala	Pan-STARRS 1	MAR	1.3 km	MPC · JPL
580865	2015 DW_{219}	—	October 31, 2005	Mauna Kea	A. Boattini	·	2.2 km	MPC · JPL
580866	2015 DG_{220}	—	January 2, 2009	Kitt Peak	Spacewatch	·	2.4 km	MPC · JPL
580867	2015 DV_{220}	—	September 10, 2007	Kitt Peak	Spacewatch	·	1.9 km	MPC · JPL
580868	2015 DP_{222}	—	March 16, 2001	Kitt Peak	Spacewatch	·	2.3 km	MPC · JPL
580869	2015 DL_{225}	—	April 9, 2004	Apache Point	SDSS	H	500 m	MPC · JPL
580870	2015 DO_{225}	—	March 9, 2002	Palomar	NEAT	H	520 m	MPC · JPL
580871	2015 DF_{228}	—	August 14, 2012	Haleakala	Pan-STARRS 1	·	2.8 km	MPC · JPL
580872	2015 DT_{228}	—	April 2, 2005	Mount Lemmon	Mount Lemmon Survey	KOR	1.1 km	MPC · JPL
580873	2015 DE_{229}	—	October 19, 2007	Mount Lemmon	Mount Lemmon Survey	EOS	1.3 km	MPC · JPL
580874	2015 DP_{229}	—	November 8, 2013	Kitt Peak	Spacewatch	PAD	1.2 km	MPC · JPL
580875	2015 DV_{229}	—	February 18, 2015	Haleakala	Pan-STARRS 1	·	1.5 km	MPC · JPL
580876	2015 DN_{230}	—	August 24, 2008	Kitt Peak	Spacewatch	·	2.1 km	MPC · JPL
580877	2015 DZ_{230}	—	October 16, 2012	Mount Lemmon	Mount Lemmon Survey	·	1.4 km	MPC · JPL
580878	2015 DA_{233}	—	April 15, 2010	Mount Lemmon	Mount Lemmon Survey	·	1.6 km	MPC · JPL
580879	2015 DK_{233}	—	March 29, 2009	Siding Spring	SSS	·	3.5 km	MPC · JPL
580880	2015 DQ_{234}	—	August 26, 2012	Haleakala	Pan-STARRS 1	AGN	1 km	MPC · JPL
580881	2015 DN_{236}	—	January 27, 2004	Kitt Peak	Spacewatch	·	1.6 km	MPC · JPL
580882	2015 DT_{237}	—	February 16, 2015	Haleakala	Pan-STARRS 1	·	1.7 km	MPC · JPL
580883	2015 DV_{239}	—	December 1, 2008	Kitt Peak	Spacewatch	·	1.6 km	MPC · JPL
580884	2015 DF_{240}	—	February 17, 2015	Haleakala	Pan-STARRS 1	·	1.1 km	MPC · JPL
580885	2015 DQ_{243}	—	January 28, 2015	Haleakala	Pan-STARRS 1	·	1.6 km	MPC · JPL
580886	2015 DW_{243}	—	June 29, 2005	Kitt Peak	Spacewatch	·	3.2 km	MPC · JPL
580887	2015 DF_{250}	—	February 18, 2015	Kitt Peak	Spacewatch	PHO	660 m	MPC · JPL
580888	2015 DH_{250}	—	February 20, 2015	Haleakala	Pan-STARRS 1	·	1.2 km	MPC · JPL
580889	2015 DH_{251}	—	February 27, 2015	Haleakala	Pan-STARRS 1	·	1.5 km	MPC · JPL
580890	2015 DN_{252}	—	February 16, 2015	Haleakala	Pan-STARRS 1	·	1.9 km	MPC · JPL
580891	2015 DZ_{253}	—	February 20, 2015	Haleakala	Pan-STARRS 1	EOS	1.6 km	MPC · JPL
580892	2015 DB_{257}	—	February 27, 2015	Mount Lemmon	Mount Lemmon Survey	HNS	1.0 km	MPC · JPL
580893	2015 DT_{261}	—	February 24, 2015	Haleakala	Pan-STARRS 1	·	1.6 km	MPC · JPL
580894	2015 DR_{263}	—	February 16, 2015	Haleakala	Pan-STARRS 1	·	1.5 km	MPC · JPL
580895	2015 DM_{265}	—	February 26, 2015	Mount Lemmon	Mount Lemmon Survey	·	1.4 km	MPC · JPL
580896	2015 DZ_{265}	—	February 18, 2015	XuYi	PMO NEO Survey Program	·	1.8 km	MPC · JPL
580897	2015 DP_{266}	—	February 20, 2015	Haleakala	Pan-STARRS 1	NAE	1.9 km	MPC · JPL
580898	2015 DE_{268}	—	February 18, 2015	Haleakala	Pan-STARRS 1	·	1.7 km	MPC · JPL
580899	2015 DU_{268}	—	February 20, 2015	Mount Lemmon	Mount Lemmon Survey	AGN	1 km	MPC · JPL
580900	2015 DG_{273}	—	February 18, 2015	Haleakala	Pan-STARRS 1	L4	7.0 km	MPC · JPL

== 580901–581000 ==
back to top

Designation			Discovery			Properties		Ref
Permanent	Provisional	Named after	Date	Site	Discoverer(s)	Category	Diam.	Ref
580901	2015 DJ_{277}	—	February 16, 2015	Haleakala	Pan-STARRS 1	EOS	1.5 km	MPC · JPL
580902	2015 DX_{279}	—	February 27, 2015	Mount Lemmon	Mount Lemmon Survey	·	1.6 km	MPC · JPL
580903	2015 DX_{285}	—	February 23, 2015	Haleakala	Pan-STARRS 1	·	2.9 km	MPC · JPL
580904	2015 DS_{286}	—	February 27, 2015	Haleakala	Pan-STARRS 1	EOS	1.4 km	MPC · JPL
580905	2015 EB	—	March 3, 2015	Haleakala	Pan-STARRS 1	H	410 m	MPC · JPL
580906	2015 EN_{2}	—	March 9, 2002	Kitt Peak	Spacewatch	·	1.9 km	MPC · JPL
580907	2015 EO_{2}	—	March 10, 2015	Cerro Paranal	Altmann, M., Prusti, T.	·	1.6 km	MPC · JPL
580908	2015 EG_{4}	—	February 16, 2015	Haleakala	Pan-STARRS 1	·	1.2 km	MPC · JPL
580909	2015 EK_{4}	—	January 21, 2015	Haleakala	Pan-STARRS 1	·	950 m	MPC · JPL
580910	2015 EO_{4}	—	May 1, 2011	Haleakala	Pan-STARRS 1	·	2.2 km	MPC · JPL
580911	2015 ER_{4}	—	October 16, 2013	Mount Lemmon	Mount Lemmon Survey	·	1.9 km	MPC · JPL
580912	2015 EZ_{5}	—	October 24, 2005	Mauna Kea	A. Boattini	·	1.7 km	MPC · JPL
580913	2015 EE_{6}	—	October 20, 2008	Mount Lemmon	Mount Lemmon Survey	·	1.7 km	MPC · JPL
580914	2015 EV_{6}	—	March 14, 2015	Haleakala	Pan-STARRS 1	H	490 m	MPC · JPL
580915	2015 EJ_{8}	—	March 9, 2008	Kitt Peak	Spacewatch	·	610 m	MPC · JPL
580916	2015 EU_{8}	—	January 19, 2007	Mauna Kea	P. A. Wiegert	MAS	630 m	MPC · JPL
580917	2015 EV_{11}	—	December 5, 2005	Mount Lemmon	Mount Lemmon Survey	·	1.4 km	MPC · JPL
580918	2015 EM_{12}	—	November 4, 2004	Kitt Peak	Spacewatch	·	2.1 km	MPC · JPL
580919	2015 EZ_{12}	—	October 16, 2009	Mount Lemmon	Mount Lemmon Survey	·	930 m	MPC · JPL
580920	2015 EF_{13}	—	March 13, 2011	Mount Lemmon	Mount Lemmon Survey	·	1.3 km	MPC · JPL
580921	2015 EG_{15}	—	March 29, 2012	Haleakala	Pan-STARRS 1	·	670 m	MPC · JPL
580922	2015 ER_{15}	—	January 23, 2015	Haleakala	Pan-STARRS 1	·	1.5 km	MPC · JPL
580923	2015 EV_{15}	—	September 28, 2009	Mount Lemmon	Mount Lemmon Survey	·	1.0 km	MPC · JPL
580924	2015 EX_{17}	—	October 24, 2013	Mount Lemmon	Mount Lemmon Survey	PAD	1.3 km	MPC · JPL
580925	2015 ES_{18}	—	June 23, 2007	Kitt Peak	Spacewatch	·	1.7 km	MPC · JPL
580926	2015 EF_{20}	—	February 2, 2006	Kitt Peak	Spacewatch	·	1.7 km	MPC · JPL
580927	2015 EO_{21}	—	January 18, 2015	Haleakala	Pan-STARRS 1	·	900 m	MPC · JPL
580928	2015 EZ_{22}	—	March 11, 2015	Kitt Peak	Spacewatch	·	1.5 km	MPC · JPL
580929	2015 ET_{24}	—	October 3, 2013	Haleakala	Pan-STARRS 1	·	1.1 km	MPC · JPL
580930	2015 ET_{25}	—	February 1, 2006	Kitt Peak	Spacewatch	·	1.5 km	MPC · JPL
580931	2015 EX_{28}	—	March 29, 2001	Kitt Peak	Spacewatch	·	2.4 km	MPC · JPL
580932	2015 EK_{29}	—	October 8, 2008	Kitt Peak	Spacewatch	·	1.6 km	MPC · JPL
580933	2015 EP_{30}	—	January 19, 2015	Mount Lemmon	Mount Lemmon Survey	GEF	1.2 km	MPC · JPL
580934	2015 EC_{31}	—	February 17, 2015	Haleakala	Pan-STARRS 1	AGN	920 m	MPC · JPL
580935	2015 EE_{31}	—	March 14, 2015	Haleakala	Pan-STARRS 1	·	1.4 km	MPC · JPL
580936	2015 EH_{31}	—	September 22, 2008	Kitt Peak	Spacewatch	·	1.5 km	MPC · JPL
580937	2015 ES_{31}	—	September 24, 2012	Mount Lemmon	Mount Lemmon Survey	·	1.8 km	MPC · JPL
580938	2015 EG_{32}	—	January 29, 2015	Haleakala	Pan-STARRS 1	·	1.8 km	MPC · JPL
580939	2015 EJ_{32}	—	August 26, 2005	Palomar	NEAT	·	1.1 km	MPC · JPL
580940	2015 EM_{33}	—	October 27, 2008	Mount Lemmon	Mount Lemmon Survey	·	1.5 km	MPC · JPL
580941	2015 EL_{35}	—	March 18, 2010	Kitt Peak	Spacewatch	·	1.8 km	MPC · JPL
580942	2015 ER_{35}	—	November 28, 2013	Mount Lemmon	Mount Lemmon Survey	·	1.4 km	MPC · JPL
580943	2015 ER_{36}	—	October 8, 2008	Kitt Peak	Spacewatch	HOF	1.8 km	MPC · JPL
580944	2015 ES_{38}	—	April 29, 2011	Mount Lemmon	Mount Lemmon Survey	·	1.7 km	MPC · JPL
580945	2015 EW_{39}	—	January 29, 2015	Haleakala	Pan-STARRS 1	·	1.3 km	MPC · JPL
580946	2015 EE_{40}	—	November 9, 2013	Haleakala	Pan-STARRS 1	·	1.6 km	MPC · JPL
580947	2015 EE_{42}	—	October 24, 2005	Mauna Kea	A. Boattini	WIT	1.1 km	MPC · JPL
580948	2015 EB_{43}	—	March 10, 2002	Kitt Peak	Spacewatch	·	2.0 km	MPC · JPL
580949	2015 EE_{43}	—	October 11, 2012	Haleakala	Pan-STARRS 1	·	2.0 km	MPC · JPL
580950	2015 ET_{43}	—	May 26, 2011	Mount Lemmon	Mount Lemmon Survey	·	1.6 km	MPC · JPL
580951	2015 EF_{44}	—	September 2, 2008	Kitt Peak	Spacewatch	·	1.6 km	MPC · JPL
580952	2015 EX_{44}	—	August 12, 2004	Palomar	NEAT	·	1.9 km	MPC · JPL
580953	2015 EC_{46}	—	October 7, 2008	Kitt Peak	Spacewatch	HOF	2.3 km	MPC · JPL
580954	2015 EB_{47}	—	February 16, 2015	Haleakala	Pan-STARRS 1	·	1.4 km	MPC · JPL
580955	2015 ED_{47}	—	August 26, 2003	Cerro Tololo	Deep Ecliptic Survey	·	1.8 km	MPC · JPL
580956	2015 EW_{48}	—	April 26, 2006	Mount Lemmon	Mount Lemmon Survey	AGN	1.0 km	MPC · JPL
580957	2015 EL_{49}	—	September 27, 2003	Kitt Peak	Spacewatch	HOF	2.3 km	MPC · JPL
580958	2015 ET_{49}	—	February 24, 2015	Haleakala	Pan-STARRS 1	·	1.4 km	MPC · JPL
580959	2015 EZ_{49}	—	April 1, 2011	Mount Lemmon	Mount Lemmon Survey	·	1.2 km	MPC · JPL
580960	2015 EN_{50}	—	November 7, 2005	Mauna Kea	A. Boattini	·	1.4 km	MPC · JPL
580961	2015 ES_{50}	—	September 18, 2003	Kitt Peak	Spacewatch	·	1.9 km	MPC · JPL
580962	2015 EE_{51}	—	August 24, 2008	Kitt Peak	Spacewatch	MAR	980 m	MPC · JPL
580963	2015 ED_{53}	—	April 6, 2011	Mount Lemmon	Mount Lemmon Survey	·	1.7 km	MPC · JPL
580964	2015 EL_{53}	—	March 14, 2015	Haleakala	Pan-STARRS 1	·	1.1 km	MPC · JPL
580965	2015 EG_{54}	—	November 2, 2005	Mount Lemmon	Mount Lemmon Survey	·	1.3 km	MPC · JPL
580966	2015 EH_{54}	—	September 28, 2008	Catalina	CSS	·	2.1 km	MPC · JPL
580967	2015 EN_{54}	—	March 25, 2011	Kitt Peak	Spacewatch	·	1.7 km	MPC · JPL
580968	2015 EC_{56}	—	January 30, 2006	Kitt Peak	Spacewatch	·	1.5 km	MPC · JPL
580969	2015 EO_{56}	—	January 23, 2015	Haleakala	Pan-STARRS 1	GEF	1.3 km	MPC · JPL
580970	2015 EG_{57}	—	December 29, 2014	Haleakala	Pan-STARRS 1	·	1.9 km	MPC · JPL
580971	2015 EU_{57}	—	November 9, 2013	Haleakala	Pan-STARRS 1	·	1.6 km	MPC · JPL
580972	2015 EB_{58}	—	May 11, 2010	Mount Lemmon	Mount Lemmon Survey	·	2.2 km	MPC · JPL
580973	2015 EK_{61}	—	June 14, 2010	Mount Lemmon	Mount Lemmon Survey	·	3.1 km	MPC · JPL
580974	2015 ES_{63}	—	October 25, 2013	Kitt Peak	Spacewatch	DOR	2.2 km	MPC · JPL
580975	2015 EL_{65}	—	January 20, 2015	Haleakala	Pan-STARRS 1	·	1.6 km	MPC · JPL
580976	2015 EK_{67}	—	April 7, 2006	Kitt Peak	Spacewatch	·	1.7 km	MPC · JPL
580977	2015 EF_{68}	—	March 8, 2005	Mount Lemmon	Mount Lemmon Survey	·	1.7 km	MPC · JPL
580978	2015 EV_{68}	—	February 10, 2011	Mount Lemmon	Mount Lemmon Survey	·	1.4 km	MPC · JPL
580979	2015 EE_{70}	—	January 29, 2015	Haleakala	Pan-STARRS 1	·	1.6 km	MPC · JPL
580980	2015 EU_{70}	—	February 16, 2015	Haleakala	Pan-STARRS 1	·	770 m	MPC · JPL
580981	2015 EH_{72}	—	November 7, 2005	Mauna Kea	A. Boattini	·	1.6 km	MPC · JPL
580982	2015 EK_{72}	—	March 14, 2015	Haleakala	Pan-STARRS 1	·	1.5 km	MPC · JPL
580983	2015 EQ_{72}	—	October 15, 2013	Kitt Peak	Spacewatch	·	1.4 km	MPC · JPL
580984	2015 EE_{73}	—	October 28, 2008	Kitt Peak	Spacewatch	·	1.6 km	MPC · JPL
580985	2015 EX_{73}	—	January 26, 2015	Haleakala	Pan-STARRS 1	·	1.6 km	MPC · JPL
580986	2015 EY_{73}	—	January 20, 2015	Haleakala	Pan-STARRS 1	H	460 m	MPC · JPL
580987	2015 EW_{74}	—	March 15, 2015	Mount Lemmon	Mount Lemmon Survey	H	510 m	MPC · JPL
580988	2015 EJ_{75}	—	January 28, 2004	Kitt Peak	Spacewatch	·	1.6 km	MPC · JPL
580989	2015 ET_{75}	—	March 14, 2015	Mount Lemmon	Mount Lemmon Survey	H	440 m	MPC · JPL
580990	2015 FH	—	February 17, 2007	Kitt Peak	Spacewatch	H	360 m	MPC · JPL
580991	2015 FK_{1}	—	April 1, 2011	Kitt Peak	Spacewatch	·	1.6 km	MPC · JPL
580992	2015 FA_{2}	—	November 9, 2013	Haleakala	Pan-STARRS 1	·	1.9 km	MPC · JPL
580993	2015 FF_{3}	—	November 29, 2014	Haleakala	Pan-STARRS 1	·	1.6 km	MPC · JPL
580994	2015 FW_{3}	—	December 26, 2014	Haleakala	Pan-STARRS 1	·	2.7 km	MPC · JPL
580995	2015 FX_{3}	—	January 13, 2015	Haleakala	Pan-STARRS 1	·	2.1 km	MPC · JPL
580996	2015 FK_{4}	—	October 9, 2013	Mount Lemmon	Mount Lemmon Survey	BRA	1.1 km	MPC · JPL
580997	2015 FD_{6}	—	January 19, 2015	Mount Lemmon	Mount Lemmon Survey	·	1.3 km	MPC · JPL
580998	2015 FH_{6}	—	January 16, 2015	Haleakala	Pan-STARRS 1	·	1.6 km	MPC · JPL
580999	2015 FZ_{6}	—	January 20, 2015	Mount Lemmon	Mount Lemmon Survey	H	370 m	MPC · JPL
581000	2015 FA_{7}	—	October 3, 2013	Haleakala	Pan-STARRS 1	·	1.2 km	MPC · JPL

back to top

== Meaning of names ==
As minor planet discoveries are confirmed, they are given a permanent number by the IAU's Minor Planet Center (MPC), and the discoverers can then submit names for them, following the IAU's naming conventions. The list below concerns those minor planets in the specified number-range that have received names, and explains the meanings of those names.

Official naming citations of newly named small Solar System bodies are approved and published in a bulletin by IAU's Working Group for Small Bodies Nomenclature (WGSBN). Before May 2021, citations were published in MPC's Minor Planet Circulars for many decades. Recent citations can also be found on the JPL Small-Body Database (SBDB). Until his death in 2016, German astronomer Lutz D. Schmadel compiled these citations into the Dictionary of Minor Planet Names (DMP) and regularly updated the collection.

Based on Paul Herget's The Names of the Minor Planets, Schmadel also researched the unclear origin of numerous asteroids, most of which had been named prior to World War II. This article incorporates text from this source, which is in the public domain: SBDB New namings may only be added to this list below after official publication as the preannouncement of names is condemned. The WGSBN publishes a comprehensive guideline for the naming rules of non-cometary small Solar System bodies.

Named minor planet	Provisional	This minor planet was named for...	Ref · Catalog
580123 Gedek	2015 BG_{20}	Marcin Gedek (born 1978), a Polish amateur astronomer who has set up a number of remotely operated observatories, one of which is the Polonia Observatory (W98) in Chile, where comet C/2015 F2 (Polonia) was discovered (SBDB).	IAU · 580123
580301 Aznarmacías	2015 BD_{238}	Amadeo Aznar Macías (born 1974) is a Spanish astronomer with EURONEAR, astronomy communicator, and expert in light-curve photometry of binary near-Earth, Mars-crossing and main-belt asteroids.	IAU · 580301
580311 Saselemér	2011 BN_{47}	Elemér Sas (1930–1998) was a Hungarian physicist, teacher and science communicator, who hosted several popular TV programms.	IAU · 580311
580619 Harangiszabolcs	2015 CF_{61}	Szabolcs Harangi (born 1962), Hungarian geochemist and volcanologist.	IAU · 580619
