= List of minor planets: 732001–733000 =

The following is a partial list of minor planets, running from minor-planet number 732001 through 733000, inclusive. The primary data for this and other partial lists is based on JPL's "Small-Body Orbital Elements" and data available from the Minor Planet Center. Critical list information is also provided by the MPC, unless otherwise specified from Lowell Observatory. A detailed description of the table's columns and additional sources are given on the main page including a complete list of every page in this series, and a statistical break-up on the dynamical classification of minor planets.

Also see the summary list of all named bodies in numerical and alphabetical order, and the corresponding naming citations for the number range of this particular list. New namings may only be added to this list after official publication, as the preannouncement of names is condemned by the Working Group for Small Bodies Nomenclature of the International Astronomical Union.

Near-Earth obj.	MBA (inner)	MBA (outer)	Centaur
Mars-crosser	MBA (middle)	Jupiter trojan	Trans-Neptunian obj.
Unclassified

== 732001–732100 ==
Designation			Discovery			Properties		Ref
Permanent	Provisional	Named after	Date	Site	Discoverer(s)	Category	Diam.	Ref
732001	2013 UU_{11}	—	September 8, 2004	Palomar	NEAT	·	2.4 km	MPC · JPL
732002	2013 UD_{15}	—	October 3, 2013	Kitt Peak	Spacewatch	·	2.5 km	MPC · JPL
732003	2013 UE_{19}	—	October 26, 2013	Kitt Peak	Spacewatch	·	3.1 km	MPC · JPL
732004	2013 UW_{21}	—	September 21, 2009	Mount Lemmon	Mount Lemmon Survey	·	890 m	MPC · JPL
732005	2013 UK_{22}	—	October 23, 2013	Haleakala	Pan-STARRS 1	PHO	1.1 km	MPC · JPL
732006	2013 UE_{24}	—	October 25, 2013	Mount Lemmon	Mount Lemmon Survey	·	570 m	MPC · JPL
732007	2013 UR_{28}	—	May 15, 2010	WISE	WISE	·	3.6 km	MPC · JPL
732008	2013 UY_{28}	—	October 10, 2008	Mount Lemmon	Mount Lemmon Survey	·	2.5 km	MPC · JPL
732009	2013 UV_{33}	—	October 31, 2013	Mount Lemmon	Mount Lemmon Survey	·	2.8 km	MPC · JPL
732010	2013 UL_{40}	—	October 30, 2013	Haleakala	Pan-STARRS 1	·	1.1 km	MPC · JPL
732011	2013 UG_{41}	—	September 17, 2013	Mount Lemmon	Mount Lemmon Survey	·	2.4 km	MPC · JPL
732012	2013 US_{42}	—	October 24, 2013	Mount Lemmon	Mount Lemmon Survey	·	3.3 km	MPC · JPL
732013	2013 UL_{53}	—	August 24, 2008	Kitt Peak	Spacewatch	·	1.4 km	MPC · JPL
732014	2013 VS	—	September 12, 1997	Haleakala	AMOS	·	1.1 km	MPC · JPL
732015	2013 VG_{4}	—	December 15, 2001	Apache Point	SDSS Collaboration	·	2.1 km	MPC · JPL
732016	2013 VB_{11}	—	November 1, 2002	Palomar	NEAT	·	4.7 km	MPC · JPL
732017	2013 VO_{17}	—	September 14, 2013	Mount Lemmon	Mount Lemmon Survey	·	1.5 km	MPC · JPL
732018	2013 VP_{18}	—	December 10, 2009	Zelenchukskaya	T. V. Krjačko	·	2.8 km	MPC · JPL
732019	2013 VX_{18}	—	December 1, 2006	Mount Lemmon	Mount Lemmon Survey	MAS	710 m	MPC · JPL
732020	2013 VB_{19}	—	April 24, 2007	Mount Lemmon	Mount Lemmon Survey	L5	10 km	MPC · JPL
732021	2013 VS_{22}	—	September 20, 2003	Kitt Peak	Spacewatch	·	3.3 km	MPC · JPL
732022	2013 VH_{24}	—	November 20, 2014	Haleakala	Pan-STARRS 1	L5	6.8 km	MPC · JPL
732023	2013 VK_{31}	—	November 12, 2013	Kitt Peak	Spacewatch	·	960 m	MPC · JPL
732024	2013 VO_{31}	—	November 9, 2013	Kitt Peak	Spacewatch	·	860 m	MPC · JPL
732025	2013 VY_{49}	—	November 9, 2013	Mount Lemmon	Mount Lemmon Survey	·	2.2 km	MPC · JPL
732026	2013 VM_{51}	—	November 9, 2013	Haleakala	Pan-STARRS 1	·	590 m	MPC · JPL
732027	2013 VR_{55}	—	November 1, 2013	Haleakala	Pan-STARRS 1	VER	2.4 km	MPC · JPL
732028	2013 VF_{58}	—	November 4, 2013	Mount Lemmon	Mount Lemmon Survey	·	1.2 km	MPC · JPL
732029	2013 VR_{61}	—	November 2, 2013	Mount Lemmon	Mount Lemmon Survey	ELF	3.1 km	MPC · JPL
732030	2013 VH_{62}	—	November 9, 2013	Mount Lemmon	Mount Lemmon Survey	·	830 m	MPC · JPL
732031	2013 VT_{63}	—	November 9, 2013	Kitt Peak	Spacewatch	·	1.7 km	MPC · JPL
732032	2013 VU_{64}	—	November 9, 2013	Mount Lemmon	Mount Lemmon Survey	·	2.9 km	MPC · JPL
732033	2013 VP_{69}	—	November 8, 2013	Mount Lemmon	Mount Lemmon Survey	THM	2.1 km	MPC · JPL
732034	2013 WD	—	October 30, 2002	Palomar	NEAT	T_{j} (2.99) · EUP	3.5 km	MPC · JPL
732035	2013 WD_{6}	—	March 21, 1999	Apache Point	SDSS Collaboration	·	3.2 km	MPC · JPL
732036	2013 WM_{7}	—	November 24, 2002	Palomar	NEAT	·	4.1 km	MPC · JPL
732037	2013 WQ_{10}	—	November 24, 2009	Kitt Peak	Spacewatch	KON	2.0 km	MPC · JPL
732038	2013 WS_{12}	—	October 1, 2005	Mount Lemmon	Mount Lemmon Survey	MAS	620 m	MPC · JPL
732039	2013 WT_{12}	—	December 15, 2009	Catalina	CSS	·	1.6 km	MPC · JPL
732040	2013 WV_{16}	—	January 23, 2011	Mount Lemmon	Mount Lemmon Survey	(883)	670 m	MPC · JPL
732041	2013 WS_{17}	—	September 4, 2003	Kitt Peak	Spacewatch	·	1.8 km	MPC · JPL
732042	2013 WW_{17}	—	May 25, 2003	Nogales	P. R. Holvorcem, M. Schwartz	·	2.1 km	MPC · JPL
732043	2013 WO_{21}	—	February 20, 2010	Dauban	C. Rinner, Kugel, F.	DOR	2.2 km	MPC · JPL
732044	2013 WH_{22}	—	January 17, 2004	Palomar	NEAT	·	3.8 km	MPC · JPL
732045	2013 WT_{22}	—	December 1, 2008	Mount Lemmon	Mount Lemmon Survey	LUT	4.8 km	MPC · JPL
732046	2013 WJ_{25}	—	September 5, 2000	Apache Point	SDSS Collaboration	L5	8.2 km	MPC · JPL
732047	2013 WH_{31}	—	September 21, 2001	Apache Point	SDSS Collaboration	·	1.2 km	MPC · JPL
732048	2013 WV_{33}	—	February 8, 2010	Kitt Peak	Spacewatch	·	2.5 km	MPC · JPL
732049	2013 WV_{35}	—	December 29, 2003	Kitt Peak	Spacewatch	HYG	3.9 km	MPC · JPL
732050	2013 WF_{37}	—	November 27, 2013	Haleakala	Pan-STARRS 1	V	540 m	MPC · JPL
732051	2013 WV_{37}	—	November 12, 2001	Apache Point	SDSS Collaboration	·	4.1 km	MPC · JPL
732052	2013 WC_{38}	—	November 28, 2013	Kitt Peak	Spacewatch	·	2.4 km	MPC · JPL
732053	2013 WX_{38}	—	November 28, 2013	Kitt Peak	Spacewatch	·	950 m	MPC · JPL
732054	2013 WY_{40}	—	December 17, 2009	Mount Lemmon	Mount Lemmon Survey	·	1.5 km	MPC · JPL
732055	2013 WD_{41}	—	November 28, 2013	Mount Lemmon	Mount Lemmon Survey	KOR	1.2 km	MPC · JPL
732056	2013 WQ_{45}	—	December 3, 2008	Kitt Peak	Spacewatch	H	440 m	MPC · JPL
732057	2013 WE_{48}	—	February 14, 2010	Mount Lemmon	Mount Lemmon Survey	·	3.1 km	MPC · JPL
732058	2013 WD_{49}	—	February 12, 2004	Kitt Peak	Spacewatch	·	2.5 km	MPC · JPL
732059	2013 WL_{49}	—	February 18, 2010	WISE	WISE	·	1.1 km	MPC · JPL
732060	2013 WT_{50}	—	May 23, 2010	WISE	WISE	·	3.2 km	MPC · JPL
732061	2013 WO_{52}	—	November 25, 2013	Haleakala	Pan-STARRS 1	·	690 m	MPC · JPL
732062	2013 WU_{52}	—	November 21, 2008	Kitt Peak	Spacewatch	·	2.1 km	MPC · JPL
732063	2013 WV_{52}	—	December 2, 2008	Kitt Peak	Spacewatch	·	2.2 km	MPC · JPL
732064	2013 WA_{54}	—	January 28, 2006	Mount Lemmon	Mount Lemmon Survey	·	860 m	MPC · JPL
732065	2013 WH_{55}	—	October 13, 1999	Apache Point	SDSS	·	750 m	MPC · JPL
732066	2013 WQ_{56}	—	December 15, 2009	Bergisch Gladbach	W. Bickel	·	2.9 km	MPC · JPL
732067	2013 WP_{57}	—	November 16, 2006	Mount Lemmon	Mount Lemmon Survey	MAS	660 m	MPC · JPL
732068	2013 WB_{58}	—	January 18, 2004	Kitt Peak	Spacewatch	·	2.9 km	MPC · JPL
732069	2013 WS_{59}	—	November 3, 2013	Westfield	International Astronomical Search Collaboration	·	2.7 km	MPC · JPL
732070	2013 WV_{59}	—	October 27, 2013	Kitt Peak	Spacewatch	·	2.7 km	MPC · JPL
732071	2013 WZ_{62}	—	August 30, 2002	Palomar	NEAT	·	2.0 km	MPC · JPL
732072	2013 WM_{63}	—	December 3, 2002	Palomar	NEAT	TIR	2.7 km	MPC · JPL
732073	2013 WM_{66}	—	April 1, 2010	WISE	WISE	·	2.9 km	MPC · JPL
732074	2013 WY_{66}	—	January 26, 2010	WISE	WISE	EUP	3.6 km	MPC · JPL
732075	2013 WE_{68}	—	October 11, 2004	Kitt Peak	Spacewatch	·	2.7 km	MPC · JPL
732076	2013 WY_{68}	—	February 9, 2005	La Silla	A. Boattini	·	3.4 km	MPC · JPL
732077	2013 WB_{73}	—	October 15, 2004	Mount Lemmon	Mount Lemmon Survey	·	1.7 km	MPC · JPL
732078	2013 WF_{73}	—	November 14, 2002	Kitt Peak	Spacewatch	·	4.6 km	MPC · JPL
732079	2013 WZ_{74}	—	December 5, 2008	Kitt Peak	Spacewatch	·	2.1 km	MPC · JPL
732080	2013 WB_{79}	—	December 22, 2008	Mount Lemmon	Mount Lemmon Survey	·	3.0 km	MPC · JPL
732081	2013 WR_{81}	—	June 2, 2010	WISE	WISE	·	2.2 km	MPC · JPL
732082	2013 WQ_{84}	—	March 31, 2010	WISE	WISE	·	2.3 km	MPC · JPL
732083	2013 WC_{87}	—	July 13, 2004	Siding Spring	SSS	·	1.7 km	MPC · JPL
732084	2013 WD_{89}	—	March 11, 2011	Mount Lemmon	Mount Lemmon Survey	·	820 m	MPC · JPL
732085	2013 WM_{89}	—	October 16, 2002	Palomar	NEAT	EOS	2.8 km	MPC · JPL
732086	2013 WM_{91}	—	April 8, 2010	WISE	WISE	·	2.0 km	MPC · JPL
732087	2013 WK_{92}	—	February 27, 2007	Kitt Peak	Spacewatch	MAS	550 m	MPC · JPL
732088	2013 WN_{93}	—	November 28, 2013	Mount Lemmon	Mount Lemmon Survey	·	870 m	MPC · JPL
732089	2013 WP_{95}	—	June 14, 2010	WISE	WISE	·	4.3 km	MPC · JPL
732090	2013 WY_{97}	—	November 28, 2013	Mount Lemmon	Mount Lemmon Survey	LIX	3.2 km	MPC · JPL
732091	2013 WM_{98}	—	February 17, 2010	Catalina	CSS	CLO	2.1 km	MPC · JPL
732092	2013 WM_{99}	—	August 16, 2001	Palomar	NEAT	·	3.8 km	MPC · JPL
732093	2013 WT_{101}	—	March 2, 2011	Kitt Peak	Spacewatch	·	1.5 km	MPC · JPL
732094	2013 WT_{102}	—	February 23, 2007	Mount Lemmon	Mount Lemmon Survey	·	840 m	MPC · JPL
732095	2013 WR_{104}	—	January 16, 2005	Kitt Peak	Spacewatch	·	1.8 km	MPC · JPL
732096	2013 WU_{104}	—	January 22, 2010	WISE	WISE	·	4.2 km	MPC · JPL
732097	2013 WR_{105}	—	November 30, 2013	Haleakala	Pan-STARRS 1	·	2.7 km	MPC · JPL
732098	2013 WQ_{111}	—	November 25, 2013	Haleakala	Pan-STARRS 1	VER	2.3 km	MPC · JPL
732099	2013 WK_{112}	—	November 28, 2013	Mount Lemmon	Mount Lemmon Survey	·	2.1 km	MPC · JPL
732100	2013 WZ_{112}	—	August 21, 2012	Haleakala	Pan-STARRS 1	·	1.7 km	MPC · JPL

== 732101–732200 ==
back to top

Designation			Discovery			Properties		Ref
Permanent	Provisional	Named after	Date	Site	Discoverer(s)	Category	Diam.	Ref
732101	2013 WN_{113}	—	November 29, 2013	Haleakala	Pan-STARRS 1	·	1.9 km	MPC · JPL
732102	2013 WF_{116}	—	April 28, 2010	WISE	WISE	·	1.3 km	MPC · JPL
732103	2013 WH_{117}	—	January 15, 2010	WISE	WISE	LUT	3.3 km	MPC · JPL
732104	2013 WO_{117}	—	January 21, 2015	Haleakala	Pan-STARRS 1	·	1.5 km	MPC · JPL
732105	2013 WH_{120}	—	October 25, 2013	Mount Lemmon	Mount Lemmon Survey	·	2.7 km	MPC · JPL
732106	2013 WP_{123}	—	March 10, 2010	WISE	WISE	·	1.0 km	MPC · JPL
732107	2013 WW_{131}	—	November 28, 2013	Mount Lemmon	Mount Lemmon Survey	·	1.2 km	MPC · JPL
732108	2013 WQ_{135}	—	November 27, 2013	Haleakala	Pan-STARRS 1	EOS	1.3 km	MPC · JPL
732109	2013 XX	—	October 14, 2003	Palomar	NEAT	HOF	3.2 km	MPC · JPL
732110	2013 XF_{2}	—	March 15, 2010	Catalina	CSS	·	1.5 km	MPC · JPL
732111	2013 XQ_{8}	—	December 6, 2013	Elena Remote	Oreshko, A.	NYS	890 m	MPC · JPL
732112	2013 XC_{13}	—	June 2, 2010	WISE	WISE	EMA	3.3 km	MPC · JPL
732113	2013 XN_{17}	—	February 12, 2010	WISE	WISE	·	3.5 km	MPC · JPL
732114	2013 XL_{28}	—	December 11, 2013	Mount Lemmon	Mount Lemmon Survey	EUN	960 m	MPC · JPL
732115	2013 XB_{37}	—	December 6, 2013	Haleakala	Pan-STARRS 1	·	2.3 km	MPC · JPL
732116	2013 XP_{38}	—	December 14, 2013	Mount Lemmon	Mount Lemmon Survey	·	3.2 km	MPC · JPL
732117	2013 XE_{41}	—	December 4, 2013	Haleakala	Pan-STARRS 1	·	910 m	MPC · JPL
732118	2013 YU	—	November 20, 2008	Kitt Peak	Spacewatch	·	1.9 km	MPC · JPL
732119	2013 YE_{2}	—	November 20, 2005	Palomar	NEAT	·	3.1 km	MPC · JPL
732120	2013 YQ_{3}	—	April 18, 2007	Mount Lemmon	Mount Lemmon Survey	KON	3.1 km	MPC · JPL
732121	2013 YR_{7}	—	December 24, 2013	Mount Lemmon	Mount Lemmon Survey	·	670 m	MPC · JPL
732122	2013 YD_{8}	—	November 12, 2001	Apache Point	SDSS Collaboration	T_{j} (2.95)	4.8 km	MPC · JPL
732123	2013 YU_{8}	—	February 2, 2008	Bélesta-en-Lauragais	Martinez, P.	·	3.8 km	MPC · JPL
732124	2013 YU_{9}	—	March 16, 2004	Palomar	NEAT	·	6.0 km	MPC · JPL
732125	2013 YM_{12}	—	April 13, 2002	Palomar	NEAT	·	2.2 km	MPC · JPL
732126	2013 YW_{12}	—	October 16, 2009	Mount Lemmon	Mount Lemmon Survey	NYS	1.0 km	MPC · JPL
732127	2013 YD_{16}	—	March 20, 1999	Apache Point	SDSS Collaboration	EOS	2.5 km	MPC · JPL
732128	2013 YB_{18}	—	December 24, 2013	Mount Lemmon	Mount Lemmon Survey	·	1.3 km	MPC · JPL
732129	2013 YO_{20}	—	December 26, 2013	Kitt Peak	Spacewatch	·	1.3 km	MPC · JPL
732130	2013 YL_{22}	—	March 5, 2002	Apache Point	SDSS	·	1.6 km	MPC · JPL
732131	2013 YX_{24}	—	October 26, 2013	Mount Lemmon	Mount Lemmon Survey	·	1.7 km	MPC · JPL
732132	2013 YP_{27}	—	January 17, 2007	Kitt Peak	Spacewatch	·	850 m	MPC · JPL
732133	2013 YU_{34}	—	December 27, 2013	Kitt Peak	Spacewatch	·	1.1 km	MPC · JPL
732134	2013 YG_{36}	—	March 15, 2010	Kitt Peak	Spacewatch	EOS	1.8 km	MPC · JPL
732135	2013 YJ_{37}	—	January 7, 2006	Mount Lemmon	Mount Lemmon Survey	·	1.7 km	MPC · JPL
732136	2013 YN_{38}	—	November 27, 2013	Haleakala	Pan-STARRS 1	H	470 m	MPC · JPL
732137	2013 YZ_{44}	—	January 5, 2006	Mount Lemmon	Mount Lemmon Survey	·	1.3 km	MPC · JPL
732138	2013 YY_{46}	—	October 22, 2003	Apache Point	SDSS Collaboration	·	2.7 km	MPC · JPL
732139	2013 YC_{47}	—	August 5, 2010	WISE	WISE	·	3.5 km	MPC · JPL
732140	2013 YZ_{47}	—	December 29, 2013	Haleakala	Pan-STARRS 1	·	2.1 km	MPC · JPL
732141	2013 YM_{54}	—	November 28, 2013	Mount Lemmon	Mount Lemmon Survey	THM	1.6 km	MPC · JPL
732142	2013 YU_{55}	—	May 30, 2002	Palomar	NEAT	EUN	2.9 km	MPC · JPL
732143	2013 YH_{56}	—	June 16, 2010	WISE	WISE	·	2.5 km	MPC · JPL
732144	2013 YE_{58}	—	December 26, 2013	Haleakala	Pan-STARRS 1	ELF	3.1 km	MPC · JPL
732145	2013 YT_{59}	—	December 27, 2013	Kitt Peak	Spacewatch	HNS	1.2 km	MPC · JPL
732146	2013 YG_{62}	—	October 10, 2004	Palomar	NEAT	EUN	1.2 km	MPC · JPL
732147	2013 YJ_{63}	—	November 16, 2001	Kitt Peak	Deep Lens Survey	·	1.2 km	MPC · JPL
732148	2013 YT_{64}	—	April 16, 2010	WISE	WISE	EUN	1.3 km	MPC · JPL
732149	2013 YM_{69}	—	October 29, 2002	Apache Point	SDSS Collaboration	·	820 m	MPC · JPL
732150	2013 YX_{70}	—	January 26, 2003	Palomar	NEAT	·	5.4 km	MPC · JPL
732151	2013 YN_{71}	—	November 27, 2013	Haleakala	Pan-STARRS 1	·	710 m	MPC · JPL
732152	2013 YQ_{71}	—	June 24, 2010	WISE	WISE	·	3.0 km	MPC · JPL
732153	2013 YH_{74}	—	November 27, 2013	Kitt Peak	Spacewatch	MAR	1.1 km	MPC · JPL
732154	2013 YX_{76}	—	March 19, 2001	Apache Point	SDSS	·	620 m	MPC · JPL
732155	2013 YR_{80}	—	January 31, 2006	Catalina	CSS	·	2.0 km	MPC · JPL
732156	2013 YW_{84}	—	January 30, 2003	Kitt Peak	Spacewatch	·	3.0 km	MPC · JPL
732157	2013 YK_{86}	—	October 22, 2005	Kitt Peak	Spacewatch	·	1.1 km	MPC · JPL
732158	2013 YO_{87}	—	May 6, 2010	Kitt Peak	Spacewatch	·	1.9 km	MPC · JPL
732159	2013 YS_{88}	—	March 9, 2003	Nogales	P. R. Holvorcem, M. Schwartz	LIX	3.5 km	MPC · JPL
732160	2013 YV_{89}	—	July 10, 2007	Lulin	LUSS	MAR	1.6 km	MPC · JPL
732161	2013 YE_{91}	—	September 29, 2001	Palomar	NEAT	·	1.4 km	MPC · JPL
732162	2013 YW_{91}	—	March 9, 2010	WISE	WISE	·	940 m	MPC · JPL
732163	2013 YS_{94}	—	February 16, 2010	Mount Lemmon	Mount Lemmon Survey	·	990 m	MPC · JPL
732164	2013 YH_{95}	—	December 11, 2013	Mount Lemmon	Mount Lemmon Survey	·	970 m	MPC · JPL
732165	2013 YN_{97}	—	December 31, 2013	Oukaïmeden	M. Ory	·	3.3 km	MPC · JPL
732166	2013 YO_{97}	—	April 15, 2004	Palomar	NEAT	·	4.9 km	MPC · JPL
732167	2013 YF_{99}	—	January 22, 2010	WISE	WISE	·	1.7 km	MPC · JPL
732168	2013 YJ_{99}	—	November 11, 2001	Apache Point	SDSS Collaboration	·	4.4 km	MPC · JPL
732169	2013 YZ_{100}	—	December 31, 2013	Mount Lemmon	Mount Lemmon Survey	·	1.5 km	MPC · JPL
732170	2013 YJ_{101}	—	December 31, 2013	Mount Lemmon	Mount Lemmon Survey	·	800 m	MPC · JPL
732171	2013 YP_{102}	—	November 30, 2003	Kitt Peak	Spacewatch	PHO	1.4 km	MPC · JPL
732172	2013 YC_{104}	—	June 6, 2005	Kitt Peak	Spacewatch	·	2.3 km	MPC · JPL
732173	2013 YR_{104}	—	November 27, 2013	Haleakala	Pan-STARRS 1	EOS	1.7 km	MPC · JPL
732174	2013 YT_{104}	—	June 25, 2010	WISE	WISE	LUT	4.6 km	MPC · JPL
732175	2013 YM_{105}	—	January 31, 2003	Anderson Mesa	LONEOS	·	4.7 km	MPC · JPL
732176	2013 YP_{112}	—	October 3, 2006	Mount Lemmon	Mount Lemmon Survey	·	3.5 km	MPC · JPL
732177	2013 YC_{113}	—	December 30, 2013	Kitt Peak	Spacewatch	·	640 m	MPC · JPL
732178	2013 YZ_{114}	—	February 16, 2002	Palomar	NEAT	·	1.8 km	MPC · JPL
732179	2013 YP_{116}	—	April 13, 2010	WISE	WISE	LUT	3.5 km	MPC · JPL
732180	2013 YC_{119}	—	December 30, 2013	Haleakala	Pan-STARRS 1	·	1.4 km	MPC · JPL
732181	2013 YH_{124}	—	December 17, 2007	Lulin	LUSS	(21885)	3.9 km	MPC · JPL
732182	2013 YV_{125}	—	July 23, 2003	Palomar	NEAT	·	4.9 km	MPC · JPL
732183	2013 YN_{131}	—	December 31, 2013	Mount Lemmon	Mount Lemmon Survey	·	1.3 km	MPC · JPL
732184	2013 YH_{134}	—	May 13, 2004	Kitt Peak	Spacewatch	VER	2.7 km	MPC · JPL
732185	2013 YG_{139}	—	December 28, 2007	Kitt Peak	Spacewatch	·	3.1 km	MPC · JPL
732186	2013 YC_{147}	—	July 28, 2011	Haleakala	Pan-STARRS 1	·	3.2 km	MPC · JPL
732187	2013 YL_{148}	—	February 7, 2003	Anderson Mesa	LONEOS	T_{j} (2.98)	2.9 km	MPC · JPL
732188	2013 YS_{148}	—	January 24, 2004	Socorro	LINEAR	·	4.1 km	MPC · JPL
732189	2013 YL_{154}	—	October 16, 2012	Mount Lemmon	Mount Lemmon Survey	·	1.1 km	MPC · JPL
732190	2013 YY_{154}	—	February 24, 2006	Palomar	NEAT	·	1.5 km	MPC · JPL
732191	2013 YH_{155}	—	December 27, 2013	Piszkéstető	K. Sárneczky	·	960 m	MPC · JPL
732192	2013 YA_{159}	—	January 25, 2010	WISE	WISE	·	2.9 km	MPC · JPL
732193	2013 YV_{159}	—	March 17, 2010	WISE	WISE	T_{j} (2.99) · EUP	3.0 km	MPC · JPL
732194	2013 YG_{162}	—	December 27, 2013	Mount Lemmon	Mount Lemmon Survey	EOS	1.2 km	MPC · JPL
732195	2013 YY_{163}	—	December 24, 2013	Mount Lemmon	Mount Lemmon Survey	MAS	640 m	MPC · JPL
732196	2013 YD_{170}	—	October 11, 2012	Mount Lemmon	Mount Lemmon Survey	·	1.1 km	MPC · JPL
732197	2014 AO_{5}	—	January 8, 2010	Kitt Peak	Spacewatch	(5)	1.1 km	MPC · JPL
732198	2014 AN_{7}	—	October 21, 2001	Socorro	LINEAR	NYS	840 m	MPC · JPL
732199	2014 AJ_{10}	—	January 1, 2014	Mount Lemmon	Mount Lemmon Survey	·	830 m	MPC · JPL
732200	2014 AM_{10}	—	February 13, 2010	WISE	WISE	·	2.1 km	MPC · JPL

== 732201–732300 ==
back to top

Designation			Discovery			Properties		Ref
Permanent	Provisional	Named after	Date	Site	Discoverer(s)	Category	Diam.	Ref
732201	2014 AT_{11}	—	October 11, 1996	Haleakala	NEAT	·	1.7 km	MPC · JPL
732202	2014 AM_{12}	—	September 23, 2008	Catalina	CSS	MAR	1.1 km	MPC · JPL
732203	2014 AU_{13}	—	February 16, 2010	WISE	WISE	·	3.2 km	MPC · JPL
732204	2014 AK_{14}	—	January 12, 2010	Catalina	CSS	·	1.2 km	MPC · JPL
732205	2014 AS_{14}	—	July 29, 2010	WISE	WISE	·	2.4 km	MPC · JPL
732206	2014 AK_{15}	—	January 3, 2014	Mount Lemmon	Mount Lemmon Survey	EUN	870 m	MPC · JPL
732207	2014 AX_{17}	—	February 12, 2004	Kitt Peak	Spacewatch	·	3.4 km	MPC · JPL
732208	2014 AN_{24}	—	March 2, 2010	WISE	WISE	·	2.2 km	MPC · JPL
732209	2014 AQ_{24}	—	January 3, 2014	Mount Lemmon	Mount Lemmon Survey	·	740 m	MPC · JPL
732210	2014 AL_{25}	—	April 29, 2010	WISE	WISE	·	2.8 km	MPC · JPL
732211	2014 AL_{27}	—	July 3, 2005	Palomar	NEAT	V	670 m	MPC · JPL
732212	2014 AS_{27}	—	January 4, 2014	Haleakala	Pan-STARRS 1	·	1.7 km	MPC · JPL
732213	2014 AM_{34}	—	October 26, 2009	Kitt Peak	Spacewatch	·	900 m	MPC · JPL
732214	2014 AP_{34}	—	October 30, 2008	Mount Lemmon	Mount Lemmon Survey	EOS	2.0 km	MPC · JPL
732215	2014 AG_{36}	—	November 1, 2005	Mount Lemmon	Mount Lemmon Survey	MAS	550 m	MPC · JPL
732216	2014 AW_{36}	—	February 10, 2010	WISE	WISE	AEG	3.5 km	MPC · JPL
732217	2014 AY_{36}	—	September 18, 2009	Kitt Peak	Spacewatch	NYS	870 m	MPC · JPL
732218	2014 AK_{37}	—	January 3, 2014	Kitt Peak	Spacewatch	·	1.6 km	MPC · JPL
732219	2014 AS_{40}	—	February 15, 2010	Mount Lemmon	Mount Lemmon Survey	·	1.6 km	MPC · JPL
732220	2014 AD_{44}	—	February 23, 2003	Palomar	NEAT	EUP	4.5 km	MPC · JPL
732221	2014 AW_{48}	—	October 22, 2003	Apache Point	SDSS Collaboration	DOR	3.1 km	MPC · JPL
732222	2014 AH_{52}	—	June 14, 2010	WISE	WISE	·	2.4 km	MPC · JPL
732223	2014 AT_{52}	—	February 24, 2010	WISE	WISE	·	2.3 km	MPC · JPL
732224	2014 AD_{53}	—	January 17, 2010	WISE	WISE	·	3.5 km	MPC · JPL
732225	2014 AZ_{64}	—	March 21, 2015	Haleakala	Pan-STARRS 1	(5)	1.1 km	MPC · JPL
732226	2014 AM_{65}	—	January 2, 2014	Kitt Peak	Spacewatch	·	970 m	MPC · JPL
732227	2014 AP_{68}	—	January 9, 2014	Kitt Peak	Spacewatch	·	2.6 km	MPC · JPL
732228	2014 AS_{68}	—	January 10, 2014	Mount Lemmon	Mount Lemmon Survey	·	2.7 km	MPC · JPL
732229	2014 BR_{1}	—	March 9, 2003	Palomar	NEAT	T_{j} (2.99)	3.9 km	MPC · JPL
732230	2014 BW_{11}	—	November 10, 2009	Kitt Peak	Spacewatch	·	860 m	MPC · JPL
732231	2014 BR_{12}	—	March 13, 2010	Kitt Peak	Spacewatch	·	1.3 km	MPC · JPL
732232	2014 BQ_{14}	—	March 23, 2003	Apache Point	SDSS Collaboration	·	940 m	MPC · JPL
732233	2014 BT_{14}	—	February 1, 2003	Palomar	NEAT	·	1.5 km	MPC · JPL
732234	2014 BJ_{19}	—	October 21, 2012	Mount Lemmon	Mount Lemmon Survey	AGN	950 m	MPC · JPL
732235	2014 BL_{20}	—	March 14, 2010	Catalina	CSS	·	1.4 km	MPC · JPL
732236	2014 BC_{22}	—	August 26, 2012	Haleakala	Pan-STARRS 1	·	1.0 km	MPC · JPL
732237	2014 BH_{22}	—	February 22, 2003	Palomar	NEAT	·	4.1 km	MPC · JPL
732238	2014 BL_{23}	—	March 13, 2010	WISE	WISE	·	3.2 km	MPC · JPL
732239	2014 BM_{23}	—	January 5, 2014	Haleakala	Pan-STARRS 1	(31811)	2.4 km	MPC · JPL
732240	2014 BT_{26}	—	November 25, 2009	Kitt Peak	Spacewatch	·	960 m	MPC · JPL
732241	2014 BH_{27}	—	December 24, 2013	Mount Lemmon	Mount Lemmon Survey	·	1.0 km	MPC · JPL
732242	2014 BU_{27}	—	January 21, 2014	Mount Lemmon	Mount Lemmon Survey	·	970 m	MPC · JPL
732243	2014 BY_{27}	—	July 12, 1993	La Silla	E. W. Elst	·	1.8 km	MPC · JPL
732244	2014 BX_{31}	—	December 5, 2007	Kitt Peak	Spacewatch	·	2.8 km	MPC · JPL
732245	2014 BF_{36}	—	January 14, 2008	Kitt Peak	Spacewatch	·	3.3 km	MPC · JPL
732246	2014 BL_{37}	—	February 11, 2003	Haleakala	NEAT	·	3.6 km	MPC · JPL
732247	2014 BO_{38}	—	January 23, 2014	Mount Lemmon	Mount Lemmon Survey	MAS	560 m	MPC · JPL
732248	2014 BK_{48}	—	February 21, 2003	Palomar	NEAT	EUP	4.9 km	MPC · JPL
732249	2014 BM_{49}	—	October 30, 2005	Mount Lemmon	Mount Lemmon Survey	·	1.0 km	MPC · JPL
732250	2014 BK_{55}	—	January 5, 2010	Kitt Peak	Spacewatch	·	970 m	MPC · JPL
732251	2014 BM_{55}	—	January 21, 2014	Mount Lemmon	Mount Lemmon Survey	EOS	1.7 km	MPC · JPL
732252	2014 BV_{56}	—	November 24, 2008	Mount Lemmon	Mount Lemmon Survey	·	2.4 km	MPC · JPL
732253	2014 BK_{63}	—	September 4, 2004	Palomar	NEAT	·	1.4 km	MPC · JPL
732254	2014 BL_{64}	—	May 24, 2006	Kitt Peak	Spacewatch	·	1.4 km	MPC · JPL
732255	2014 BL_{66}	—	January 29, 2014	Kitt Peak	Spacewatch	·	1.2 km	MPC · JPL
732256	2014 BS_{66}	—	April 2, 2010	WISE	WISE	·	4.6 km	MPC · JPL
732257	2014 BG_{67}	—	November 11, 2001	Apache Point	SDSS Collaboration	EOS	2.1 km	MPC · JPL
732258	2014 BK_{71}	—	May 16, 2010	WISE	WISE	·	2.4 km	MPC · JPL
732259	2014 BG_{76}	—	January 26, 2014	Haleakala	Pan-STARRS 1	·	1.5 km	MPC · JPL
732260	2014 BB_{83}	—	January 25, 2014	Haleakala	Pan-STARRS 1	·	1.2 km	MPC · JPL
732261	2014 BT_{89}	—	January 24, 2014	Haleakala	Pan-STARRS 1	·	2.3 km	MPC · JPL
732262	2014 CO_{3}	—	January 28, 2003	Palomar	NEAT	·	3.3 km	MPC · JPL
732263	2014 CA_{8}	—	September 13, 2007	Mount Lemmon	Mount Lemmon Survey	·	1.8 km	MPC · JPL
732264	2014 CJ_{8}	—	June 9, 2010	WISE	WISE	·	2.7 km	MPC · JPL
732265	2014 CM_{10}	—	February 6, 2014	Mount Lemmon	Mount Lemmon Survey	·	1.4 km	MPC · JPL
732266	2014 CG_{11}	—	September 28, 2006	Catalina	CSS	·	3.0 km	MPC · JPL
732267	2014 CH_{12}	—	June 10, 2010	WISE	WISE	·	1.7 km	MPC · JPL
732268	2014 CA_{18}	—	October 7, 2008	Mount Lemmon	Mount Lemmon Survey	EUN	900 m	MPC · JPL
732269	2014 CQ_{19}	—	February 2, 2003	Anderson Mesa	LONEOS	EUP	4.7 km	MPC · JPL
732270	2014 CV_{21}	—	March 3, 2006	Mount Lemmon	Mount Lemmon Survey	·	1.3 km	MPC · JPL
732271	2014 CP_{22}	—	January 3, 2014	Mount Lemmon	Mount Lemmon Survey	BRG	1.3 km	MPC · JPL
732272 Langejans	2014 CE_{24}	Langejans	October 18, 2012	Piszkés-tető	M. Langbroek, K. Sárneczky	·	1.4 km	MPC · JPL
732273	2014 CN_{25}	—	February 21, 2003	Palomar	NEAT	·	4.0 km	MPC · JPL
732274	2014 CO_{25}	—	February 9, 2014	Kitt Peak	Spacewatch	·	1.3 km	MPC · JPL
732275	2014 CD_{26}	—	March 4, 2003	Cima Ekar	ADAS	HYG	2.2 km	MPC · JPL
732276	2014 CJ_{27}	—	November 13, 2012	Kitt Peak	Spacewatch	·	1.1 km	MPC · JPL
732277	2014 CD_{30}	—	June 20, 2015	Haleakala	Pan-STARRS 2	·	1.5 km	MPC · JPL
732278	2014 CA_{35}	—	February 11, 2014	Mount Lemmon	Mount Lemmon Survey	HNS	820 m	MPC · JPL
732279	2014 DG_{1}	—	September 28, 2003	Kitt Peak	Spacewatch	·	1.8 km	MPC · JPL
732280	2014 DQ_{3}	—	April 9, 2010	Mount Lemmon	Mount Lemmon Survey	·	1.6 km	MPC · JPL
732281	2014 DR_{5}	—	July 4, 2005	Mount Lemmon	Mount Lemmon Survey	·	3.0 km	MPC · JPL
732282	2014 DV_{7}	—	August 22, 2003	Palomar	NEAT	·	1.7 km	MPC · JPL
732283	2014 DY_{11}	—	February 19, 2014	Mount Lemmon	Mount Lemmon Survey	·	1.3 km	MPC · JPL
732284	2014 DK_{13}	—	May 24, 2006	Palomar	NEAT	·	1.9 km	MPC · JPL
732285	2014 DG_{14}	—	March 11, 2005	Catalina	CSS	·	4.0 km	MPC · JPL
732286	2014 DD_{17}	—	January 13, 2010	WISE	WISE	PHO	1.3 km	MPC · JPL
732287	2014 DE_{17}	—	January 30, 2009	Catalina	CSS	·	3.6 km	MPC · JPL
732288	2014 DX_{17}	—	December 20, 2004	Catalina	CSS	·	3.2 km	MPC · JPL
732289	2014 DK_{18}	—	February 9, 2014	Mount Lemmon	Mount Lemmon Survey	·	1.5 km	MPC · JPL
732290	2014 DW_{18}	—	September 7, 2002	Ondřejov	P. Pravec, P. Kušnirák	·	2.0 km	MPC · JPL
732291	2014 DB_{19}	—	June 17, 2010	WISE	WISE	·	2.0 km	MPC · JPL
732292	2014 DS_{20}	—	November 8, 2007	Kanab	Sheridan, E.	EMA	3.8 km	MPC · JPL
732293	2014 DU_{20}	—	October 27, 2008	Mount Lemmon	Mount Lemmon Survey	·	2.2 km	MPC · JPL
732294	2014 DX_{20}	—	April 10, 2002	Palomar	NEAT	·	1.9 km	MPC · JPL
732295	2014 DA_{28}	—	September 22, 2008	Mount Lemmon	Mount Lemmon Survey	·	1.1 km	MPC · JPL
732296	2014 DG_{29}	—	February 15, 2010	Kitt Peak	Spacewatch	(5)	970 m	MPC · JPL
732297	2014 DD_{33}	—	August 25, 2005	Palomar	NEAT	·	4.5 km	MPC · JPL
732298	2014 DG_{33}	—	August 4, 2005	Palomar	NEAT	·	5.0 km	MPC · JPL
732299	2014 DV_{35}	—	April 25, 2003	Apache Point	SDSS Collaboration	·	2.7 km	MPC · JPL
732300	2014 DD_{37}	—	February 22, 2014	Mount Lemmon	Mount Lemmon Survey	·	1.4 km	MPC · JPL

== 732301–732400 ==
back to top

Designation			Discovery			Properties		Ref
Permanent	Provisional	Named after	Date	Site	Discoverer(s)	Category	Diam.	Ref
732301	2014 DF_{37}	—	February 22, 2014	Mount Lemmon	Mount Lemmon Survey	·	1.0 km	MPC · JPL
732302	2014 DP_{39}	—	July 5, 2005	Mount Lemmon	Mount Lemmon Survey	·	5.0 km	MPC · JPL
732303	2014 DE_{40}	—	January 8, 2010	Mount Lemmon	Mount Lemmon Survey	ADE	2.1 km	MPC · JPL
732304	2014 DL_{44}	—	February 26, 2014	Mount Lemmon	Mount Lemmon Survey	L4	6.0 km	MPC · JPL
732305	2014 DF_{45}	—	March 10, 2003	Kitt Peak	Spacewatch	·	1.2 km	MPC · JPL
732306	2014 DH_{48}	—	September 17, 2006	Kitt Peak	Spacewatch	·	1.7 km	MPC · JPL
732307	2014 DQ_{51}	—	August 29, 2002	Palomar	NEAT	·	1.3 km	MPC · JPL
732308	2014 DK_{52}	—	February 26, 2014	Haleakala	Pan-STARRS 1	MAR	670 m	MPC · JPL
732309	2014 DA_{53}	—	December 11, 2012	Mount Lemmon	Mount Lemmon Survey	·	1.9 km	MPC · JPL
732310	2014 DQ_{54}	—	March 23, 2003	Apache Point	SDSS Collaboration	THM	1.8 km	MPC · JPL
732311	2014 DK_{55}	—	October 26, 2008	Kitt Peak	Spacewatch	·	800 m	MPC · JPL
732312	2014 DT_{57}	—	August 29, 2002	Palomar	NEAT	·	1.3 km	MPC · JPL
732313	2014 DQ_{58}	—	October 15, 2007	Mount Lemmon	Mount Lemmon Survey	·	1.6 km	MPC · JPL
732314	2014 DX_{58}	—	February 26, 2014	Haleakala	Pan-STARRS 1	·	870 m	MPC · JPL
732315	2014 DC_{66}	—	February 26, 2014	Haleakala	Pan-STARRS 1	HOF	2.5 km	MPC · JPL
732316	2014 DE_{67}	—	April 22, 2007	Kitt Peak	Spacewatch	·	830 m	MPC · JPL
732317	2014 DO_{68}	—	February 26, 2014	Haleakala	Pan-STARRS 1	·	1.3 km	MPC · JPL
732318	2014 DL_{69}	—	February 26, 2014	Haleakala	Pan-STARRS 1	·	1.3 km	MPC · JPL
732319	2014 DL_{72}	—	September 15, 2012	Catalina	CSS	·	1.0 km	MPC · JPL
732320	2014 DS_{72}	—	May 11, 2010	WISE	WISE	·	2.5 km	MPC · JPL
732321	2014 DQ_{73}	—	October 15, 2001	Palomar	NEAT	EOS	2.3 km	MPC · JPL
732322	2014 DC_{76}	—	September 26, 1998	Socorro	LINEAR	·	1.8 km	MPC · JPL
732323	2014 DM_{76}	—	February 26, 2014	Haleakala	Pan-STARRS 1	·	1.9 km	MPC · JPL
732324	2014 DY_{76}	—	May 19, 1998	Kitt Peak	Spacewatch	·	2.0 km	MPC · JPL
732325	2014 DF_{82}	—	August 24, 2011	Haleakala	Pan-STARRS 1	EOS	1.4 km	MPC · JPL
732326	2014 DV_{84}	—	September 28, 2000	Kitt Peak	Spacewatch	·	3.5 km	MPC · JPL
732327	2014 DB_{87}	—	March 26, 2003	Anderson Mesa	LONEOS	PHO	2.5 km	MPC · JPL
732328	2014 DB_{89}	—	May 5, 2010	Mount Lemmon	Mount Lemmon Survey	KON	2.6 km	MPC · JPL
732329	2014 DV_{92}	—	February 9, 2005	Mount Lemmon	Mount Lemmon Survey	·	1.6 km	MPC · JPL
732330	2014 DP_{93}	—	February 26, 2014	Mount Lemmon	Mount Lemmon Survey	·	850 m	MPC · JPL
732331	2014 DJ_{97}	—	March 10, 2003	Palomar	NEAT	ERI	1.7 km	MPC · JPL
732332	2014 DP_{97}	—	February 20, 2014	Haleakala	Pan-STARRS 1	·	1.2 km	MPC · JPL
732333	2014 DW_{98}	—	March 11, 2003	Kitt Peak	Spacewatch	·	1.1 km	MPC · JPL
732334	2014 DQ_{99}	—	September 21, 2012	Mount Lemmon	Mount Lemmon Survey	·	2.0 km	MPC · JPL
732335	2014 DT_{100}	—	October 22, 2003	Kitt Peak	Spacewatch	·	1.9 km	MPC · JPL
732336	2014 DD_{101}	—	March 24, 2003	Kitt Peak	Spacewatch	·	2.9 km	MPC · JPL
732337	2014 DE_{103}	—	August 29, 2005	Palomar	NEAT	·	2.3 km	MPC · JPL
732338	2014 DK_{103}	—	February 9, 2014	Kitt Peak	Spacewatch	·	1.1 km	MPC · JPL
732339	2014 DG_{105}	—	April 6, 2010	Mount Lemmon	Mount Lemmon Survey	·	1.2 km	MPC · JPL
732340	2014 DP_{105}	—	February 9, 2003	Palomar	NEAT	·	5.8 km	MPC · JPL
732341	2014 DH_{106}	—	November 1, 2005	Mount Lemmon	Mount Lemmon Survey	NYS	970 m	MPC · JPL
732342	2014 DR_{106}	—	February 27, 2014	Mount Lemmon	Mount Lemmon Survey	·	1.7 km	MPC · JPL
732343	2014 DQ_{107}	—	January 28, 2014	Kitt Peak	Spacewatch	BRG	1.3 km	MPC · JPL
732344	2014 DR_{109}	—	October 11, 2005	Kitt Peak	Spacewatch	LUT	3.8 km	MPC · JPL
732345	2014 DA_{110}	—	June 17, 2006	Kitt Peak	Spacewatch	·	1.4 km	MPC · JPL
732346	2014 DH_{111}	—	February 5, 2014	Nogales	M. Schwartz, P. R. Holvorcem	·	2.3 km	MPC · JPL
732347	2014 DQ_{115}	—	November 12, 2006	Mount Lemmon	Mount Lemmon Survey	·	1.7 km	MPC · JPL
732348	2014 DU_{116}	—	August 26, 2003	Cerro Tololo	Deep Ecliptic Survey	·	1.7 km	MPC · JPL
732349	2014 DJ_{117}	—	January 14, 2010	WISE	WISE	L4	9.3 km	MPC · JPL
732350	2014 DZ_{117}	—	June 21, 2010	Mount Lemmon	Mount Lemmon Survey	·	1.9 km	MPC · JPL
732351	2014 DE_{119}	—	February 9, 2014	Haleakala	Pan-STARRS 1	·	1.1 km	MPC · JPL
732352	2014 DT_{119}	—	August 27, 2005	Palomar	NEAT	·	2.9 km	MPC · JPL
732353	2014 DY_{119}	—	February 27, 2014	Haleakala	Pan-STARRS 1	(5)	1.2 km	MPC · JPL
732354	2014 DG_{121}	—	July 9, 2002	Palomar	NEAT	·	1.2 km	MPC · JPL
732355	2014 DL_{121}	—	September 3, 2005	Palomar	NEAT	·	1.2 km	MPC · JPL
732356	2014 DC_{123}	—	January 8, 2010	WISE	WISE	L4	10 km	MPC · JPL
732357	2014 DP_{123}	—	February 28, 2014	Haleakala	Pan-STARRS 1	L4	7.3 km	MPC · JPL
732358	2014 DZ_{124}	—	October 1, 2008	Mount Lemmon	Mount Lemmon Survey	·	690 m	MPC · JPL
732359	2014 DR_{125}	—	September 2, 2011	Haleakala	Pan-STARRS 1	·	1.5 km	MPC · JPL
732360	2014 DT_{131}	—	February 28, 2014	Haleakala	Pan-STARRS 1	·	1.3 km	MPC · JPL
732361	2014 DB_{132}	—	December 20, 2000	Kitt Peak	Deep Lens Survey	·	5.3 km	MPC · JPL
732362	2014 DV_{132}	—	March 16, 2010	Mount Lemmon	Mount Lemmon Survey	KON	1.9 km	MPC · JPL
732363	2014 DT_{134}	—	February 28, 2014	Haleakala	Pan-STARRS 1	·	2.1 km	MPC · JPL
732364	2014 DA_{135}	—	April 2, 2009	Kitt Peak	Spacewatch	HYG	2.8 km	MPC · JPL
732365	2014 DS_{135}	—	June 7, 2010	WISE	WISE	·	3.0 km	MPC · JPL
732366	2014 DD_{136}	—	November 7, 2002	Kitt Peak	Deep Ecliptic Survey	KOR	1.2 km	MPC · JPL
732367	2014 DO_{136}	—	February 28, 2014	Haleakala	Pan-STARRS 1	·	700 m	MPC · JPL
732368	2014 DU_{136}	—	October 1, 2005	Mount Lemmon	Mount Lemmon Survey	THM	2.3 km	MPC · JPL
732369	2014 DD_{141}	—	September 26, 2016	Haleakala	Pan-STARRS 1	·	970 m	MPC · JPL
732370	2014 DV_{142}	—	September 17, 2006	Kitt Peak	Spacewatch	EUP	3.5 km	MPC · JPL
732371	2014 DA_{146}	—	April 10, 2010	Mount Lemmon	Mount Lemmon Survey	MAR	840 m	MPC · JPL
732372	2014 DF_{147}	—	April 9, 2010	Mount Lemmon	Mount Lemmon Survey	·	1.1 km	MPC · JPL
732373	2014 DG_{148}	—	March 16, 2010	Mount Lemmon	Mount Lemmon Survey	·	1 km	MPC · JPL
732374	2014 DP_{150}	—	October 22, 2012	Kitt Peak	Spacewatch	V	600 m	MPC · JPL
732375	2014 DL_{155}	—	February 28, 2014	Haleakala	Pan-STARRS 1	·	1.8 km	MPC · JPL
732376	2014 DP_{163}	—	March 15, 2009	Kitt Peak	Spacewatch	·	2.2 km	MPC · JPL
732377	2014 DP_{167}	—	February 26, 2014	Haleakala	Pan-STARRS 1	MRX	780 m	MPC · JPL
732378	2014 DL_{169}	—	February 28, 2014	Haleakala	Pan-STARRS 1	EUN	1.0 km	MPC · JPL
732379	2014 DQ_{169}	—	February 20, 2014	Mount Lemmon	Mount Lemmon Survey	·	510 m	MPC · JPL
732380	2014 DF_{171}	—	February 24, 2014	Haleakala	Pan-STARRS 1	·	2.1 km	MPC · JPL
732381	2014 DU_{171}	—	February 28, 2014	Haleakala	Pan-STARRS 1	·	1.8 km	MPC · JPL
732382	2014 DE_{175}	—	February 28, 2014	Haleakala	Pan-STARRS 1	(5)	1.2 km	MPC · JPL
732383	2014 DU_{176}	—	February 19, 2014	Mount Lemmon	Mount Lemmon Survey	·	2.5 km	MPC · JPL
732384	2014 DW_{178}	—	February 28, 2014	Haleakala	Pan-STARRS 1	·	970 m	MPC · JPL
732385	2014 DY_{183}	—	February 21, 2009	Mount Lemmon	Mount Lemmon Survey	KOR	1.2 km	MPC · JPL
732386	2014 DT_{185}	—	February 28, 2014	Haleakala	Pan-STARRS 1	EOS	1.3 km	MPC · JPL
732387	2014 DO_{192}	—	February 24, 2014	Haleakala	Pan-STARRS 1	·	1.4 km	MPC · JPL
732388	2014 DJ_{198}	—	February 26, 2014	Haleakala	Pan-STARRS 1	·	1.2 km	MPC · JPL
732389	2014 EV	—	September 4, 2011	Haleakala	Pan-STARRS 1	·	2.4 km	MPC · JPL
732390	2014 EJ_{1}	—	January 8, 2002	Apache Point	SDSS	·	2.8 km	MPC · JPL
732391	2014 EN_{5}	—	August 24, 2008	Kitt Peak	Spacewatch	L4	10 km	MPC · JPL
732392	2014 EN_{9}	—	August 27, 2006	Kitt Peak	Spacewatch	EOS	1.4 km	MPC · JPL
732393	2014 EH_{10}	—	March 6, 2014	Modra	Gajdoš, S.	·	1.8 km	MPC · JPL
732394	2014 EC_{11}	—	August 30, 2005	Kitt Peak	Spacewatch	·	3.0 km	MPC · JPL
732395	2014 EE_{13}	—	October 17, 2012	Haleakala	Pan-STARRS 1	·	980 m	MPC · JPL
732396	2014 EL_{14}	—	October 1, 2006	Kitt Peak	Spacewatch	·	2.2 km	MPC · JPL
732397	2014 ER_{15}	—	September 6, 2008	Kitt Peak	Spacewatch	(5)	860 m	MPC · JPL
732398	2014 EM_{20}	—	October 9, 2012	Mount Lemmon	Mount Lemmon Survey	·	880 m	MPC · JPL
732399	2014 EQ_{20}	—	February 2, 2014	ESA OGS	ESA OGS	·	2.5 km	MPC · JPL
732400	2014 ET_{26}	—	August 12, 2007	Charleston	R. Holmes	L4	20 km	MPC · JPL

== 732401–732500 ==
back to top

Designation			Discovery			Properties		Ref
Permanent	Provisional	Named after	Date	Site	Discoverer(s)	Category	Diam.	Ref
732401	2014 EV_{27}	—	October 30, 2002	Apache Point	SDSS Collaboration	KOR	1.5 km	MPC · JPL
732402	2014 ET_{28}	—	October 18, 2012	Haleakala	Pan-STARRS 1	·	1.4 km	MPC · JPL
732403	2014 EE_{29}	—	February 7, 2010	WISE	WISE	·	2.1 km	MPC · JPL
732404	2014 EC_{30}	—	November 16, 2012	Haleakala	Pan-STARRS 1	EUN	930 m	MPC · JPL
732405	2014 EN_{31}	—	April 9, 2010	Catalina	CSS	EUN	1.1 km	MPC · JPL
732406	2014 EE_{32}	—	March 9, 2003	Kitt Peak	Spacewatch	·	1.6 km	MPC · JPL
732407	2014 ET_{33}	—	January 2, 2009	Kitt Peak	Spacewatch	·	1.5 km	MPC · JPL
732408	2014 EO_{35}	—	March 8, 2014	Mount Lemmon	Mount Lemmon Survey	L4	9.8 km	MPC · JPL
732409	2014 EM_{36}	—	January 26, 2010	WISE	WISE	L4 · ERY	8.8 km	MPC · JPL
732410	2014 ER_{37}	—	December 25, 2009	Kitt Peak	Spacewatch	·	940 m	MPC · JPL
732411	2014 EX_{39}	—	December 13, 2012	Mount Lemmon	Mount Lemmon Survey	EOS	1.8 km	MPC · JPL
732412	2014 EQ_{42}	—	March 8, 2014	Mount Lemmon	Mount Lemmon Survey	·	1.5 km	MPC · JPL
732413	2014 EW_{43}	—	March 31, 2009	Kitt Peak	Spacewatch	EOS	1.9 km	MPC · JPL
732414	2014 ES_{49}	—	May 6, 2005	Socorro	LINEAR	BRA	1.9 km	MPC · JPL
732415	2014 EH_{51}	—	August 3, 2002	Palomar	NEAT	EUN	1.9 km	MPC · JPL
732416	2014 EK_{51}	—	October 14, 2009	Mount Lemmon	Mount Lemmon Survey	L4	10 km	MPC · JPL
732417	2014 EC_{62}	—	July 9, 2016	Haleakala	Pan-STARRS 1	·	2.0 km	MPC · JPL
732418	2014 EZ_{62}	—	October 29, 2008	Mount Lemmon	Mount Lemmon Survey	·	2.7 km	MPC · JPL
732419	2014 EJ_{66}	—	May 30, 2015	Haleakala	Pan-STARRS 1	MAR	860 m	MPC · JPL
732420	2014 EK_{73}	—	May 18, 2010	WISE	WISE	·	3.5 km	MPC · JPL
732421	2014 EJ_{77}	—	July 12, 2005	Mount Lemmon	Mount Lemmon Survey	·	2.7 km	MPC · JPL
732422	2014 EH_{78}	—	January 10, 2008	Mount Lemmon	Mount Lemmon Survey	·	3.3 km	MPC · JPL
732423	2014 ES_{81}	—	August 9, 2015	Haleakala	Pan-STARRS 2	·	580 m	MPC · JPL
732424	2014 EX_{81}	—	November 13, 2010	Mount Lemmon	Mount Lemmon Survey	L4	5.6 km	MPC · JPL
732425	2014 EH_{87}	—	June 23, 2015	Haleakala	Pan-STARRS 1	·	1.2 km	MPC · JPL
732426	2014 ER_{94}	—	March 13, 2010	WISE	WISE	PHO	2.6 km	MPC · JPL
732427	2014 EW_{109}	—	August 31, 2005	Campo Imperatore	CINEOS	·	3.2 km	MPC · JPL
732428	2014 EP_{127}	—	December 13, 2006	Mount Lemmon	Mount Lemmon Survey	·	4.3 km	MPC · JPL
732429	2014 EO_{131}	—	October 8, 2012	Haleakala	Pan-STARRS 1	MAR	740 m	MPC · JPL
732430	2014 EG_{132}	—	March 29, 2015	Haleakala	Pan-STARRS 1	L4	7.0 km	MPC · JPL
732431	2014 EG_{136}	—	June 26, 2015	Haleakala	Pan-STARRS 1	·	1.2 km	MPC · JPL
732432	2014 EN_{142}	—	March 3, 2014	Cerro Tololo-DECam	DECam	·	1.0 km	MPC · JPL
732433	2014 EG_{144}	—	January 10, 2013	Haleakala	Pan-STARRS 1	L4	6.3 km	MPC · JPL
732434	2014 EN_{144}	—	November 8, 2008	Kitt Peak	Spacewatch	·	1.1 km	MPC · JPL
732435	2014 EO_{151}	—	October 8, 2016	Haleakala	Pan-STARRS 1	·	1.6 km	MPC · JPL
732436	2014 EY_{151}	—	January 11, 2008	Kitt Peak	Spacewatch	·	2.4 km	MPC · JPL
732437	2014 EE_{154}	—	October 11, 2012	Haleakala	Pan-STARRS 1	V	510 m	MPC · JPL
732438	2014 EO_{154}	—	March 26, 2006	Kitt Peak	Spacewatch	·	1.1 km	MPC · JPL
732439	2014 EH_{161}	—	January 21, 2004	Socorro	LINEAR	·	2.3 km	MPC · JPL
732440	2014 EJ_{167}	—	October 7, 2008	Kitt Peak	Spacewatch	·	750 m	MPC · JPL
732441	2014 EG_{168}	—	February 28, 2014	Haleakala	Pan-STARRS 1	·	910 m	MPC · JPL
732442	2014 EQ_{169}	—	July 15, 2005	Mount Lemmon	Mount Lemmon Survey	·	540 m	MPC · JPL
732443	2014 ET_{173}	—	July 30, 1995	Kitt Peak	Spacewatch	·	1.6 km	MPC · JPL
732444	2014 EE_{176}	—	October 10, 2012	Haleakala	Pan-STARRS 1	·	1.4 km	MPC · JPL
732445	2014 EP_{176}	—	October 1, 2005	Catalina	CSS	·	2.0 km	MPC · JPL
732446	2014 EX_{177}	—	August 25, 2012	Kitt Peak	Spacewatch	·	510 m	MPC · JPL
732447	2014 EN_{181}	—	April 21, 2015	Cerro Tololo-DECam	DECam	L4	5.3 km	MPC · JPL
732448	2014 EC_{196}	—	September 22, 2009	Kitt Peak	Spacewatch	L4	6.2 km	MPC · JPL
732449	2014 EC_{208}	—	September 27, 2006	Kitt Peak	Spacewatch	·	1.8 km	MPC · JPL
732450	2014 EK_{208}	—	June 18, 2015	Haleakala	Pan-STARRS 1	·	970 m	MPC · JPL
732451	2014 EQ_{214}	—	November 18, 2008	Kitt Peak	Spacewatch	·	1.4 km	MPC · JPL
732452	2014 EK_{219}	—	July 23, 2015	Haleakala	Pan-STARRS 1	·	590 m	MPC · JPL
732453	2014 EF_{220}	—	January 16, 2008	Kitt Peak	Spacewatch	EOS	2.1 km	MPC · JPL
732454	2014 EH_{221}	—	December 19, 2004	Mount Lemmon	Mount Lemmon Survey	·	1.4 km	MPC · JPL
732455	2014 ER_{222}	—	July 23, 2010	WISE	WISE	·	1.2 km	MPC · JPL
732456	2014 EA_{225}	—	May 21, 2015	Haleakala	Pan-STARRS 1	·	2.0 km	MPC · JPL
732457	2014 EM_{232}	—	August 10, 2016	Haleakala	Pan-STARRS 1	·	1.4 km	MPC · JPL
732458	2014 EH_{235}	—	February 28, 2014	Haleakala	Pan-STARRS 1	·	1.1 km	MPC · JPL
732459	2014 EH_{242}	—	August 29, 2016	Mount Lemmon	Mount Lemmon Survey	HYG	2.2 km	MPC · JPL
732460	2014 EZ_{242}	—	July 7, 2016	Haleakala	Pan-STARRS 1	·	2.7 km	MPC · JPL
732461	2014 EM_{248}	—	September 4, 2011	Haleakala	Pan-STARRS 1	EUN	1.0 km	MPC · JPL
732462	2014 EZ_{249}	—	March 10, 2014	Mount Lemmon	Mount Lemmon Survey	·	1.3 km	MPC · JPL
732463	2014 ER_{252}	—	March 8, 2014	Mount Lemmon	Mount Lemmon Survey	·	1.5 km	MPC · JPL
732464	2014 EJ_{254}	—	March 8, 2014	Mount Lemmon	Mount Lemmon Survey	·	1.8 km	MPC · JPL
732465	2014 FM_{2}	—	November 27, 2009	Mount Lemmon	Mount Lemmon Survey	PHO	960 m	MPC · JPL
732466	2014 FD_{4}	—	November 15, 2003	Kitt Peak	Spacewatch	·	3.1 km	MPC · JPL
732467	2014 FW_{4}	—	May 11, 2010	Mount Lemmon	Mount Lemmon Survey	·	1.5 km	MPC · JPL
732468	2014 FU_{7}	—	July 23, 2003	Palomar	NEAT	(895)	6.6 km	MPC · JPL
732469	2014 FQ_{10}	—	March 20, 2014	Mount Lemmon	Mount Lemmon Survey	·	1.2 km	MPC · JPL
732470	2014 FV_{13}	—	March 20, 2014	Mount Lemmon	Mount Lemmon Survey	·	1.1 km	MPC · JPL
732471	2014 FO_{14}	—	April 24, 2010	WISE	WISE	·	2.7 km	MPC · JPL
732472 Grahamhill	2014 FM_{18}	Grahamhill	August 8, 2007	Mauna Kea	D. D. Balam, K. M. Perrett	·	1.9 km	MPC · JPL
732473	2014 FL_{20}	—	October 23, 2006	Mount Lemmon	Mount Lemmon Survey	·	4.6 km	MPC · JPL
732474	2014 FY_{30}	—	January 12, 2010	WISE	WISE	·	1.2 km	MPC · JPL
732475	2014 FA_{35}	—	December 22, 2008	Kitt Peak	Spacewatch	·	1.4 km	MPC · JPL
732476	2014 FF_{35}	—	September 12, 2001	Kitt Peak	Spacewatch	·	2.7 km	MPC · JPL
732477	2014 FP_{39}	—	May 4, 2005	Mount Lemmon	Mount Lemmon Survey	·	2.1 km	MPC · JPL
732478	2014 FB_{40}	—	November 11, 2001	Apache Point	SDSS Collaboration	·	1.3 km	MPC · JPL
732479	2014 FC_{40}	—	December 18, 2004	Mount Lemmon	Mount Lemmon Survey	·	1.2 km	MPC · JPL
732480	2014 FL_{41}	—	March 18, 2005	Catalina	CSS	·	2.4 km	MPC · JPL
732481	2014 FM_{41}	—	April 27, 2000	Anderson Mesa	LONEOS	DOR	3.5 km	MPC · JPL
732482	2014 FP_{41}	—	March 21, 2002	Palomar	NEAT	LUT	3.7 km	MPC · JPL
732483	2014 FY_{42}	—	March 11, 1996	Kitt Peak	Spacewatch	·	1.8 km	MPC · JPL
732484	2014 FC_{43}	—	April 2, 2006	Kitt Peak	Spacewatch	·	1.5 km	MPC · JPL
732485	2014 FY_{44}	—	November 14, 2012	Mount Lemmon	Mount Lemmon Survey	·	1.8 km	MPC · JPL
732486	2014 FU_{47}	—	September 18, 2003	Palomar	NEAT	·	1.9 km	MPC · JPL
732487	2014 FN_{49}	—	June 30, 2005	Palomar	NEAT	·	2.4 km	MPC · JPL
732488	2014 FM_{54}	—	September 17, 2006	Kitt Peak	Spacewatch	·	2.6 km	MPC · JPL
732489	2014 FT_{55}	—	May 16, 2010	WISE	WISE	·	2.2 km	MPC · JPL
732490	2014 FA_{56}	—	October 29, 2002	Apache Point	SDSS Collaboration	·	730 m	MPC · JPL
732491	2014 FL_{56}	—	March 26, 2014	Mount Lemmon	Mount Lemmon Survey	·	2.7 km	MPC · JPL
732492	2014 FW_{56}	—	April 27, 2001	Haleakala	NEAT	ADE	4.0 km	MPC · JPL
732493	2014 FM_{57}	—	May 11, 2005	Palomar	NEAT	·	2.9 km	MPC · JPL
732494	2014 FO_{63}	—	August 31, 2005	Kitt Peak	Spacewatch	·	3.2 km	MPC · JPL
732495	2014 FR_{63}	—	September 11, 2007	Kitt Peak	Spacewatch	·	980 m	MPC · JPL
732496	2014 FX_{64}	—	April 14, 2010	Mount Lemmon	Mount Lemmon Survey	ADE	1.6 km	MPC · JPL
732497	2014 FR_{65}	—	March 26, 2003	Palomar	NEAT	·	3.3 km	MPC · JPL
732498	2014 FU_{65}	—	April 9, 2010	WISE	WISE	·	1.5 km	MPC · JPL
732499	2014 FV_{66}	—	August 1, 2000	Socorro	LINEAR	ERI	1.4 km	MPC · JPL
732500	2014 FQ_{67}	—	October 14, 2001	Apache Point	SDSS Collaboration	·	850 m	MPC · JPL

== 732501–732600 ==
back to top

Designation			Discovery			Properties		Ref
Permanent	Provisional	Named after	Date	Site	Discoverer(s)	Category	Diam.	Ref
732501	2014 FR_{67}	—	April 10, 2014	Haleakala	Pan-STARRS 1	(194)	1.6 km	MPC · JPL
732502	2014 FY_{73}	—	December 4, 2007	Mount Lemmon	Mount Lemmon Survey	·	1.8 km	MPC · JPL
732503	2014 FM_{74}	—	March 28, 2014	Mount Lemmon	Mount Lemmon Survey	·	1.4 km	MPC · JPL
732504	2014 FP_{74}	—	March 28, 2014	Mount Lemmon	Mount Lemmon Survey	·	1.4 km	MPC · JPL
732505	2014 FT_{74}	—	September 30, 2003	Kitt Peak	Spacewatch	·	3.0 km	MPC · JPL
732506	2014 FP_{76}	—	March 23, 2014	Kitt Peak	Spacewatch	MAR	1.1 km	MPC · JPL
732507	2014 FZ_{82}	—	March 29, 2014	Mount Lemmon	Mount Lemmon Survey	·	2.2 km	MPC · JPL
732508	2014 FY_{83}	—	March 28, 2014	Mount Lemmon	Mount Lemmon Survey	·	1.4 km	MPC · JPL
732509	2014 FW_{84}	—	March 22, 2014	Kitt Peak	Spacewatch	EUN	860 m	MPC · JPL
732510	2014 FO_{85}	—	March 20, 2014	Mount Lemmon	Mount Lemmon Survey	·	1.3 km	MPC · JPL
732511	2014 FX_{88}	—	March 24, 2014	Haleakala	Pan-STARRS 1	·	1.5 km	MPC · JPL
732512	2014 GY	—	September 11, 2007	Mount Lemmon	Mount Lemmon Survey	·	1.1 km	MPC · JPL
732513	2014 GV_{1}	—	April 9, 2010	Kitt Peak	Spacewatch	·	950 m	MPC · JPL
732514	2014 GD_{2}	—	February 21, 2002	Kitt Peak	Spacewatch	VER	3.3 km	MPC · JPL
732515	2014 GO_{2}	—	April 1, 2014	Kitt Peak	Spacewatch	·	610 m	MPC · JPL
732516	2014 GQ_{2}	—	September 30, 2010	Mount Lemmon	Mount Lemmon Survey	·	3.4 km	MPC · JPL
732517	2014 GE_{6}	—	November 21, 2001	Apache Point	SDSS Collaboration	·	5.8 km	MPC · JPL
732518	2014 GL_{6}	—	November 21, 2001	Apache Point	SDSS Collaboration	·	3.7 km	MPC · JPL
732519	2014 GF_{7}	—	September 28, 1994	Kitt Peak	Spacewatch	MAR	930 m	MPC · JPL
732520	2014 GY_{7}	—	February 25, 2006	Mount Lemmon	Mount Lemmon Survey	PHO	720 m	MPC · JPL
732521	2014 GJ_{12}	—	February 26, 2014	Haleakala	Pan-STARRS 1	·	1.5 km	MPC · JPL
732522	2014 GZ_{12}	—	April 2, 2014	Mount Lemmon	Mount Lemmon Survey	·	1.2 km	MPC · JPL
732523	2014 GY_{13}	—	April 4, 2003	Kitt Peak	Spacewatch	THM	2.0 km	MPC · JPL
732524	2014 GN_{14}	—	February 14, 2005	Kitt Peak	Spacewatch	·	1.6 km	MPC · JPL
732525	2014 GO_{16}	—	August 26, 2005	Palomar	NEAT	·	3.5 km	MPC · JPL
732526	2014 GX_{16}	—	April 3, 2014	Elena Remote	Oreshko, A.	·	1.1 km	MPC · JPL
732527	2014 GZ_{16}	—	March 9, 2005	Mount Lemmon	Mount Lemmon Survey	·	1.4 km	MPC · JPL
732528	2014 GB_{17}	—	September 3, 2000	Apache Point	SDSS	·	2.2 km	MPC · JPL
732529	2014 GC_{19}	—	February 6, 2002	Palomar	NEAT	·	1.7 km	MPC · JPL
732530	2014 GN_{20}	—	September 5, 2008	Kitt Peak	Spacewatch	L4	7.8 km	MPC · JPL
732531	2014 GY_{23}	—	September 4, 2011	Haleakala	Pan-STARRS 1	·	1.8 km	MPC · JPL
732532	2014 GJ_{26}	—	August 1, 2010	WISE	WISE	·	850 m	MPC · JPL
732533	2014 GG_{27}	—	November 11, 2006	Mount Lemmon	Mount Lemmon Survey	·	2.4 km	MPC · JPL
732534	2014 GW_{28}	—	April 4, 2014	Mount Lemmon	Mount Lemmon Survey	·	1.4 km	MPC · JPL
732535	2014 GK_{30}	—	September 29, 2005	Mount Lemmon	Mount Lemmon Survey	·	2.7 km	MPC · JPL
732536	2014 GD_{31}	—	April 4, 2014	Haleakala	Pan-STARRS 1	·	1.6 km	MPC · JPL
732537	2014 GQ_{31}	—	October 22, 2012	Haleakala	Pan-STARRS 1	·	1.0 km	MPC · JPL
732538	2014 GN_{36}	—	October 2, 2003	Kitt Peak	Spacewatch	·	1.2 km	MPC · JPL
732539	2014 GU_{38}	—	January 3, 2014	Mount Lemmon	Mount Lemmon Survey	·	1.9 km	MPC · JPL
732540	2014 GA_{39}	—	March 11, 2007	Kitt Peak	Spacewatch	·	780 m	MPC · JPL
732541	2014 GH_{39}	—	September 3, 2002	Campo Imperatore	CINEOS	·	780 m	MPC · JPL
732542	2014 GB_{40}	—	October 14, 2001	Apache Point	SDSS Collaboration	3:2	7.0 km	MPC · JPL
732543	2014 GW_{40}	—	August 7, 2010	WISE	WISE	T_{j} (2.98) · EUP	3.6 km	MPC · JPL
732544	2014 GP_{43}	—	June 28, 2005	Kitt Peak	Spacewatch	·	2.3 km	MPC · JPL
732545	2014 GF_{44}	—	March 26, 2003	Kitt Peak	Spacewatch	·	1.1 km	MPC · JPL
732546	2014 GQ_{44}	—	February 17, 2009	Kitt Peak	Spacewatch	·	1.6 km	MPC · JPL
732547	2014 GP_{46}	—	October 29, 2006	Mount Lemmon	Mount Lemmon Survey	·	3.9 km	MPC · JPL
732548	2014 GN_{47}	—	October 23, 2003	Apache Point	SDSS Collaboration	EUN	1.2 km	MPC · JPL
732549	2014 GU_{47}	—	March 4, 2005	Catalina	CSS	·	1.8 km	MPC · JPL
732550	2014 GQ_{49}	—	November 7, 2005	Mauna Kea	A. Boattini	T_{j} (2.88)	4.0 km	MPC · JPL
732551	2014 GD_{52}	—	June 2, 2010	WISE	WISE	·	3.7 km	MPC · JPL
732552	2014 GH_{56}	—	April 5, 2014	Haleakala	Pan-STARRS 1	EUN	980 m	MPC · JPL
732553	2014 GT_{56}	—	April 5, 2014	Haleakala	Pan-STARRS 1	V	570 m	MPC · JPL
732554	2014 GZ_{56}	—	April 5, 2014	Haleakala	Pan-STARRS 1	·	2.5 km	MPC · JPL
732555	2014 GR_{57}	—	March 31, 2008	Mount Lemmon	Mount Lemmon Survey	·	3.0 km	MPC · JPL
732556	2014 GD_{59}	—	April 5, 2014	Haleakala	Pan-STARRS 1	·	1.6 km	MPC · JPL
732557	2014 GX_{59}	—	April 1, 2014	Kitt Peak	Spacewatch	THM	1.9 km	MPC · JPL
732558	2014 GG_{61}	—	August 20, 2006	Palomar	NEAT	·	1.9 km	MPC · JPL
732559	2014 GF_{63}	—	November 7, 2012	Mount Lemmon	Mount Lemmon Survey	EUN	1.0 km	MPC · JPL
732560	2014 GT_{63}	—	April 5, 2014	Haleakala	Pan-STARRS 1	·	1.3 km	MPC · JPL
732561	2014 GW_{63}	—	April 5, 2014	Haleakala	Pan-STARRS 1	·	1.5 km	MPC · JPL
732562	2014 GC_{64}	—	April 6, 2014	Kitt Peak	Spacewatch	·	1.0 km	MPC · JPL
732563	2014 GV_{73}	—	April 10, 2014	Haleakala	Pan-STARRS 1	·	2.8 km	MPC · JPL
732564	2014 GX_{74}	—	April 5, 2014	Haleakala	Pan-STARRS 1	·	1.5 km	MPC · JPL
732565	2014 GK_{79}	—	April 5, 2014	Haleakala	Pan-STARRS 1	·	1.4 km	MPC · JPL
732566	2014 GG_{81}	—	April 1, 2014	Kitt Peak	Spacewatch	·	1.4 km	MPC · JPL
732567	2014 GL_{82}	—	April 1, 2014	Kitt Peak	Spacewatch	·	1.2 km	MPC · JPL
732568	2014 GP_{82}	—	April 5, 2014	Haleakala	Pan-STARRS 1	·	1.2 km	MPC · JPL
732569	2014 GN_{90}	—	April 5, 2014	Haleakala	Pan-STARRS 1	·	500 m	MPC · JPL
732570	2014 HA_{6}	—	October 21, 2012	Mount Lemmon	Mount Lemmon Survey	·	1.6 km	MPC · JPL
732571 Jipa	2014 HZ_{8}	Jipa	June 4, 2011	Cerro Tololo	EURONEAR	·	1.3 km	MPC · JPL
732572	2014 HG_{9}	—	February 13, 2002	Apache Point	SDSS Collaboration	·	1.2 km	MPC · JPL
732573	2014 HM_{10}	—	April 2, 2006	Kitt Peak	Spacewatch	3:2	4.6 km	MPC · JPL
732574	2014 HV_{13}	—	April 7, 2014	Kitt Peak	Spacewatch	·	980 m	MPC · JPL
732575	2014 HF_{14}	—	April 5, 2014	Haleakala	Pan-STARRS 1	AGN	890 m	MPC · JPL
732576	2014 HF_{15}	—	September 12, 2007	Mount Lemmon	Mount Lemmon Survey	·	780 m	MPC · JPL
732577	2014 HQ_{15}	—	April 30, 2003	Kitt Peak	Spacewatch	·	3.2 km	MPC · JPL
732578	2014 HB_{17}	—	April 21, 2014	Mount Lemmon	Mount Lemmon Survey	·	1.3 km	MPC · JPL
732579	2014 HB_{20}	—	April 8, 2014	Kitt Peak	Spacewatch	·	1.1 km	MPC · JPL
732580	2014 HW_{23}	—	February 26, 2004	Kitt Peak	Deep Ecliptic Survey	·	2.2 km	MPC · JPL
732581	2014 HT_{24}	—	March 20, 1993	La Silla	C.-I. Lagerkvist	·	2.1 km	MPC · JPL
732582	2014 HV_{25}	—	March 21, 2001	Kitt Peak	Spacewatch	·	640 m	MPC · JPL
732583	2014 HR_{27}	—	April 5, 2014	Haleakala	Pan-STARRS 1	·	1.2 km	MPC · JPL
732584	2014 HV_{28}	—	August 1, 2010	WISE	WISE	·	810 m	MPC · JPL
732585	2014 HX_{30}	—	June 24, 2010	WISE	WISE	·	2.4 km	MPC · JPL
732586	2014 HJ_{36}	—	October 23, 2003	Kitt Peak	Spacewatch	·	1.4 km	MPC · JPL
732587	2014 HU_{36}	—	April 24, 2014	Mount Lemmon	Mount Lemmon Survey	WIT	660 m	MPC · JPL
732588	2014 HF_{37}	—	January 16, 2009	Kitt Peak	Spacewatch	·	1.3 km	MPC · JPL
732589	2014 HM_{37}	—	August 27, 2011	Haleakala	Pan-STARRS 1	·	1 km	MPC · JPL
732590	2014 HB_{38}	—	February 28, 2008	Kitt Peak	Spacewatch	·	3.4 km	MPC · JPL
732591	2014 HB_{40}	—	April 24, 2014	Mount Lemmon	Mount Lemmon Survey	·	1.6 km	MPC · JPL
732592	2014 HE_{40}	—	June 11, 2004	Kitt Peak	Spacewatch	·	4.0 km	MPC · JPL
732593	2014 HV_{41}	—	April 23, 2014	Cerro Tololo-DECam	DECam	·	1.2 km	MPC · JPL
732594	2014 HQ_{44}	—	April 24, 2014	Haleakala	Pan-STARRS 1	·	1.6 km	MPC · JPL
732595	2014 HW_{44}	—	April 9, 2003	Palomar	NEAT	·	3.7 km	MPC · JPL
732596	2014 HD_{45}	—	June 24, 2010	WISE	WISE	·	2.5 km	MPC · JPL
732597	2014 HB_{46}	—	February 1, 2009	Kitt Peak	Spacewatch	·	1.3 km	MPC · JPL
732598	2014 HB_{55}	—	November 17, 2008	Kitt Peak	Spacewatch	·	2.2 km	MPC · JPL
732599	2014 HC_{73}	—	December 31, 2008	Kitt Peak	Spacewatch	·	1.1 km	MPC · JPL
732600	2014 HM_{85}	—	April 6, 2014	Mount Lemmon	Mount Lemmon Survey	·	1.9 km	MPC · JPL

== 732601–732700 ==
back to top

Designation			Discovery			Properties		Ref
Permanent	Provisional	Named after	Date	Site	Discoverer(s)	Category	Diam.	Ref
732601	2014 HV_{87}	—	April 11, 2005	Kitt Peak	Deep Ecliptic Survey	·	1.3 km	MPC · JPL
732602	2014 HB_{88}	—	April 20, 2014	Mount Lemmon	Mount Lemmon Survey	·	1.1 km	MPC · JPL
732603	2014 HO_{96}	—	April 23, 2014	Cerro Tololo-DECam	DECam	·	1.3 km	MPC · JPL
732604	2014 HH_{103}	—	April 5, 2014	Haleakala	Pan-STARRS 1	·	930 m	MPC · JPL
732605	2014 HK_{110}	—	April 24, 2014	Mount Lemmon	Mount Lemmon Survey	·	1.1 km	MPC · JPL
732606	2014 HX_{120}	—	April 23, 2014	Cerro Tololo-DECam	DECam	·	2.0 km	MPC · JPL
732607	2014 HN_{125}	—	April 5, 2014	Haleakala	Pan-STARRS 1	·	1.2 km	MPC · JPL
732608	2014 HA_{126}	—	October 22, 2011	Kitt Peak	Spacewatch	EOS	1.4 km	MPC · JPL
732609	2014 HW_{127}	—	January 19, 2008	Mount Lemmon	Mount Lemmon Survey	·	2.2 km	MPC · JPL
732610	2014 HW_{131}	—	April 25, 2014	Mount Lemmon	Mount Lemmon Survey	BRG	1.1 km	MPC · JPL
732611	2014 HN_{134}	—	October 21, 2007	Mount Lemmon	Mount Lemmon Survey	·	1.5 km	MPC · JPL
732612	2014 HJ_{140}	—	October 22, 2011	Kitt Peak	Spacewatch	·	1.4 km	MPC · JPL
732613	2014 HT_{144}	—	September 25, 2005	Kitt Peak	Spacewatch	·	3.1 km	MPC · JPL
732614	2014 HS_{152}	—	June 17, 2010	Mount Lemmon	Mount Lemmon Survey	·	3.2 km	MPC · JPL
732615	2014 HK_{153}	—	August 31, 2002	Kitt Peak	Spacewatch	·	1.1 km	MPC · JPL
732616	2014 HE_{155}	—	June 25, 2010	WISE	WISE	·	3.3 km	MPC · JPL
732617	2014 HM_{160}	—	October 24, 2005	Mauna Kea	A. Boattini	·	1.6 km	MPC · JPL
732618	2014 HL_{161}	—	May 23, 2010	WISE	WISE	·	2.9 km	MPC · JPL
732619	2014 HZ_{161}	—	October 14, 2001	Apache Point	SDSS Collaboration	·	1.4 km	MPC · JPL
732620	2014 HZ_{163}	—	May 14, 2010	WISE	WISE	·	3.2 km	MPC · JPL
732621	2014 HF_{164}	—	April 28, 2014	Haleakala	Pan-STARRS 1	MAR	810 m	MPC · JPL
732622	2014 HA_{166}	—	May 4, 2009	Mount Lemmon	Mount Lemmon Survey	·	2.2 km	MPC · JPL
732623	2014 HC_{166}	—	January 16, 2013	Mount Lemmon	Mount Lemmon Survey	EOS	1.6 km	MPC · JPL
732624	2014 HK_{166}	—	February 16, 2010	WISE	WISE	·	1.8 km	MPC · JPL
732625	2014 HY_{166}	—	November 19, 2008	Kitt Peak	Spacewatch	PHO	890 m	MPC · JPL
732626	2014 HL_{170}	—	April 29, 2014	Haleakala	Pan-STARRS 1	·	1.4 km	MPC · JPL
732627	2014 HE_{171}	—	October 21, 2006	Lulin	LUSS	EOS	2.6 km	MPC · JPL
732628	2014 HX_{171}	—	September 24, 2011	Haleakala	Pan-STARRS 1	GEF	1.1 km	MPC · JPL
732629	2014 HU_{174}	—	February 20, 2009	Kitt Peak	Spacewatch	HOF	2.2 km	MPC · JPL
732630	2014 HD_{176}	—	December 4, 2007	Mount Lemmon	Mount Lemmon Survey	DOR	2.6 km	MPC · JPL
732631	2014 HK_{180}	—	February 26, 1993	Kitt Peak	Spacewatch	·	2.1 km	MPC · JPL
732632	2014 HC_{181}	—	March 4, 2005	Mount Lemmon	Mount Lemmon Survey	·	1.6 km	MPC · JPL
732633	2014 HE_{181}	—	May 18, 2010	WISE	WISE	·	2.9 km	MPC · JPL
732634	2014 HE_{185}	—	September 30, 2003	Kitt Peak	Spacewatch	HNS	940 m	MPC · JPL
732635	2014 HJ_{187}	—	July 6, 2010	WISE	WISE	·	2.3 km	MPC · JPL
732636	2014 HC_{189}	—	May 11, 2010	Mount Lemmon	Mount Lemmon Survey	·	900 m	MPC · JPL
732637	2014 HJ_{189}	—	May 30, 2010	WISE	WISE	EOS	1.9 km	MPC · JPL
732638	2014 HJ_{195}	—	January 18, 2009	Catalina	CSS	·	2.3 km	MPC · JPL
732639	2014 HG_{200}	—	November 8, 2007	Kitt Peak	Spacewatch	AGN	870 m	MPC · JPL
732640	2014 HC_{202}	—	April 30, 2014	Haleakala	Pan-STARRS 1	·	1.4 km	MPC · JPL
732641	2014 HP_{202}	—	June 1, 2005	Mount Lemmon	Mount Lemmon Survey	·	1.3 km	MPC · JPL
732642	2014 HB_{203}	—	April 24, 2014	Mount Lemmon	Mount Lemmon Survey	·	1.1 km	MPC · JPL
732643	2014 HU_{203}	—	November 5, 2007	Mount Lemmon	Mount Lemmon Survey	·	1.5 km	MPC · JPL
732644	2014 HZ_{203}	—	December 4, 2012	Mount Lemmon	Mount Lemmon Survey	·	1.4 km	MPC · JPL
732645	2014 HO_{204}	—	April 21, 2014	Kitt Peak	Spacewatch	·	2.0 km	MPC · JPL
732646	2014 HQ_{204}	—	September 18, 2007	Kitt Peak	Spacewatch	·	1.2 km	MPC · JPL
732647	2014 HY_{204}	—	April 10, 2010	Kitt Peak	Spacewatch	·	1.0 km	MPC · JPL
732648	2014 HG_{205}	—	April 24, 2014	Mount Lemmon	Mount Lemmon Survey	·	1.7 km	MPC · JPL
732649	2014 HL_{205}	—	April 6, 2014	Mount Lemmon	Mount Lemmon Survey	·	1.2 km	MPC · JPL
732650	2014 HQ_{205}	—	September 19, 2011	Mount Lemmon	Mount Lemmon Survey	·	920 m	MPC · JPL
732651	2014 HH_{206}	—	April 29, 2014	Haleakala	Pan-STARRS 1	·	1.3 km	MPC · JPL
732652	2014 HL_{211}	—	April 29, 2014	Haleakala	Pan-STARRS 1	·	1.1 km	MPC · JPL
732653	2014 HQ_{211}	—	May 7, 2010	WISE	WISE	·	3.4 km	MPC · JPL
732654	2014 HY_{222}	—	April 25, 2014	Mount Lemmon	Mount Lemmon Survey	·	860 m	MPC · JPL
732655	2014 HE_{224}	—	April 29, 2014	Haleakala	Pan-STARRS 1	·	1.3 km	MPC · JPL
732656	2014 HQ_{225}	—	April 30, 2014	Haleakala	Pan-STARRS 1	GEF	930 m	MPC · JPL
732657	2014 HS_{225}	—	April 29, 2014	Haleakala	Pan-STARRS 1	·	830 m	MPC · JPL
732658	2014 HB_{226}	—	April 29, 2014	Haleakala	Pan-STARRS 1	AGN	1 km	MPC · JPL
732659	2014 HC_{226}	—	April 29, 2014	Haleakala	Pan-STARRS 1	PAD	1.1 km	MPC · JPL
732660	2014 HV_{228}	—	April 28, 2014	Haleakala	Pan-STARRS 1	·	1.6 km	MPC · JPL
732661	2014 HE_{302}	—	July 31, 2011	Haleakala	Pan-STARRS 1	·	740 m	MPC · JPL
732662	2014 HQ_{340}	—	April 23, 2014	Cerro Tololo-DECam	DECam	·	1.2 km	MPC · JPL
732663	2014 JP_{1}	—	October 25, 2005	Kitt Peak	Spacewatch	·	2.9 km	MPC · JPL
732664	2014 JX_{2}	—	May 4, 2014	Mount Lemmon	Mount Lemmon Survey	·	1.6 km	MPC · JPL
732665	2014 JY_{2}	—	May 1, 2014	Mount Lemmon	Mount Lemmon Survey	·	1.6 km	MPC · JPL
732666	2014 JE_{5}	—	September 19, 1998	Apache Point	SDSS Collaboration	PHO	1.2 km	MPC · JPL
732667	2014 JJ_{6}	—	April 25, 2014	Mount Lemmon	Mount Lemmon Survey	·	1.0 km	MPC · JPL
732668	2014 JG_{7}	—	February 28, 2014	Haleakala	Pan-STARRS 1	·	1.8 km	MPC · JPL
732669	2014 JJ_{7}	—	February 3, 2013	Haleakala	Pan-STARRS 1	·	1.6 km	MPC · JPL
732670	2014 JP_{7}	—	May 3, 2014	Mount Lemmon	Mount Lemmon Survey	·	1.4 km	MPC · JPL
732671	2014 JE_{17}	—	September 1, 2005	Socorro	LINEAR	NAE	4.5 km	MPC · JPL
732672	2014 JR_{18}	—	May 25, 2006	Mauna Kea	P. A. Wiegert	·	2.6 km	MPC · JPL
732673	2014 JF_{21}	—	May 4, 2014	Elena Remote	Oreshko, A.	·	1.1 km	MPC · JPL
732674	2014 JQ_{22}	—	April 26, 2003	Haleakala	NEAT	·	3.7 km	MPC · JPL
732675	2014 JA_{23}	—	January 13, 2004	Kitt Peak	Spacewatch	·	2.7 km	MPC · JPL
732676	2014 JL_{23}	—	September 14, 2006	Palomar	NEAT	·	1.5 km	MPC · JPL
732677	2014 JC_{24}	—	March 26, 2003	Palomar	NEAT	V	740 m	MPC · JPL
732678	2014 JF_{27}	—	May 18, 2010	WISE	WISE	PHO	900 m	MPC · JPL
732679	2014 JB_{28}	—	April 13, 2010	WISE	WISE	EUN	1.1 km	MPC · JPL
732680	2014 JE_{28}	—	April 19, 2006	Kitt Peak	Spacewatch	·	1.4 km	MPC · JPL
732681	2014 JW_{28}	—	May 28, 2010	WISE	WISE	·	3.6 km	MPC · JPL
732682	2014 JQ_{30}	—	May 7, 2014	Mount Lemmon	Mount Lemmon Survey	H	410 m	MPC · JPL
732683	2014 JU_{31}	—	October 1, 2003	Kitt Peak	Spacewatch	·	1.2 km	MPC · JPL
732684	2014 JZ_{31}	—	October 3, 2005	Catalina	CSS	·	3.3 km	MPC · JPL
732685	2014 JJ_{32}	—	April 14, 2005	Kitt Peak	Spacewatch	·	1.6 km	MPC · JPL
732686	2014 JS_{32}	—	February 27, 2008	Mount Lemmon	Mount Lemmon Survey	·	2.1 km	MPC · JPL
732687	2014 JT_{34}	—	May 4, 2014	Mount Lemmon	Mount Lemmon Survey	·	1.8 km	MPC · JPL
732688	2014 JB_{35}	—	April 5, 2002	Palomar	NEAT	·	1.3 km	MPC · JPL
732689	2014 JY_{35}	—	April 8, 2006	Kitt Peak	Spacewatch	·	890 m	MPC · JPL
732690	2014 JC_{40}	—	July 12, 2010	WISE	WISE	·	1.5 km	MPC · JPL
732691	2014 JE_{42}	—	August 14, 2007	Siding Spring	SSS	·	2.6 km	MPC · JPL
732692	2014 JR_{42}	—	March 23, 2004	Kitt Peak	Spacewatch	·	2.2 km	MPC · JPL
732693	2014 JQ_{43}	—	April 17, 1993	Kitt Peak	Spacewatch	KON	2.4 km	MPC · JPL
732694	2014 JD_{48}	—	May 6, 2014	Haleakala	Pan-STARRS 1	·	2.4 km	MPC · JPL
732695	2014 JH_{51}	—	April 4, 2010	Catalina	CSS	·	920 m	MPC · JPL
732696	2014 JN_{52}	—	December 2, 2008	Mount Lemmon	Mount Lemmon Survey	·	1.4 km	MPC · JPL
732697	2014 JU_{52}	—	April 21, 2014	Kitt Peak	Spacewatch	NYS	930 m	MPC · JPL
732698	2014 JL_{53}	—	January 16, 2004	Palomar	NEAT	DOR	2.7 km	MPC · JPL
732699	2014 JL_{58}	—	April 8, 2014	Haleakala	Pan-STARRS 1	·	1.0 km	MPC · JPL
732700	2014 JP_{60}	—	June 25, 2010	WISE	WISE	VER	2.8 km	MPC · JPL

== 732701–732800 ==
back to top

Designation			Discovery			Properties		Ref
Permanent	Provisional	Named after	Date	Site	Discoverer(s)	Category	Diam.	Ref
732701	2014 JV_{62}	—	May 4, 2014	Haleakala	Pan-STARRS 1	·	2.0 km	MPC · JPL
732702	2014 JE_{63}	—	February 10, 2008	Mount Lemmon	Mount Lemmon Survey	·	2.0 km	MPC · JPL
732703	2014 JV_{63}	—	October 19, 2011	Mount Lemmon	Mount Lemmon Survey	·	910 m	MPC · JPL
732704	2014 JY_{66}	—	October 5, 2002	Apache Point	SDSS Collaboration	·	1.7 km	MPC · JPL
732705	2014 JV_{72}	—	October 10, 2002	Apache Point	SDSS Collaboration	·	760 m	MPC · JPL
732706	2014 JX_{72}	—	May 9, 2010	WISE	WISE	·	1.8 km	MPC · JPL
732707	2014 JB_{75}	—	May 8, 2014	Haleakala	Pan-STARRS 1	·	2.1 km	MPC · JPL
732708	2014 JA_{76}	—	April 30, 2014	Haleakala	Pan-STARRS 1	·	540 m	MPC · JPL
732709	2014 JQ_{77}	—	February 9, 2005	La Silla	A. Boattini, H. Scholl	·	2.9 km	MPC · JPL
732710	2014 JT_{77}	—	September 30, 2006	Mount Lemmon	Mount Lemmon Survey	·	2.1 km	MPC · JPL
732711	2014 JY_{77}	—	April 25, 2003	Anderson Mesa	LONEOS	·	1.5 km	MPC · JPL
732712	2014 JD_{78}	—	September 4, 2002	Palomar	NEAT	·	1.9 km	MPC · JPL
732713	2014 JG_{79}	—	April 13, 2002	Palomar	NEAT	·	6.4 km	MPC · JPL
732714	2014 JZ_{83}	—	October 27, 2005	Mount Lemmon	Mount Lemmon Survey	·	3.6 km	MPC · JPL
732715	2014 JD_{85}	—	May 3, 2014	Haleakala	Pan-STARRS 1	·	930 m	MPC · JPL
732716	2014 JM_{86}	—	January 31, 2009	Mount Lemmon	Mount Lemmon Survey	·	1.3 km	MPC · JPL
732717	2014 JL_{87}	—	May 1, 2014	ESA OGS	ESA OGS	·	1.6 km	MPC · JPL
732718	2014 JD_{88}	—	May 9, 2005	Kitt Peak	Spacewatch	·	1.6 km	MPC · JPL
732719	2014 JR_{88}	—	May 4, 2014	Haleakala	Pan-STARRS 1	·	1.4 km	MPC · JPL
732720	2014 JB_{89}	—	April 1, 2003	Apache Point	SDSS Collaboration	·	2.7 km	MPC · JPL
732721	2014 JO_{90}	—	May 8, 2014	Haleakala	Pan-STARRS 1	·	950 m	MPC · JPL
732722	2014 JY_{91}	—	May 10, 2014	Haleakala	Pan-STARRS 1	GEF	800 m	MPC · JPL
732723	2014 JJ_{92}	—	May 6, 2014	Haleakala	Pan-STARRS 1	·	1.3 km	MPC · JPL
732724	2014 JH_{93}	—	October 27, 1995	Kitt Peak	Spacewatch	·	1.5 km	MPC · JPL
732725	2014 JV_{110}	—	March 28, 2014	Mount Lemmon	Mount Lemmon Survey	·	1.1 km	MPC · JPL
732726	2014 JU_{111}	—	November 15, 1998	Kitt Peak	Spacewatch	·	1.4 km	MPC · JPL
732727	2014 JM_{115}	—	May 8, 2014	Haleakala	Pan-STARRS 1	·	1.5 km	MPC · JPL
732728	2014 JN_{119}	—	May 6, 2014	Haleakala	Pan-STARRS 1	·	1.2 km	MPC · JPL
732729	2014 JR_{121}	—	May 3, 2014	Haleakala	Pan-STARRS 1	·	950 m	MPC · JPL
732730	2014 JE_{132}	—	October 19, 2003	Kitt Peak	Spacewatch	HNS	840 m	MPC · JPL
732731	2014 JJ_{143}	—	May 8, 2014	Haleakala	Pan-STARRS 1	·	1.4 km	MPC · JPL
732732	2014 KT_{1}	—	March 28, 2014	Haleakala	Pan-STARRS 1	·	1.3 km	MPC · JPL
732733	2014 KV_{1}	—	May 20, 2005	Mount Lemmon	Mount Lemmon Survey	·	2.2 km	MPC · JPL
732734	2014 KE_{3}	—	April 2, 2010	WISE	WISE	·	1.9 km	MPC · JPL
732735	2014 KX_{7}	—	April 4, 2014	Kitt Peak	Spacewatch	·	1.4 km	MPC · JPL
732736	2014 KU_{14}	—	December 20, 2007	Kitt Peak	Spacewatch	·	2.4 km	MPC · JPL
732737	2014 KK_{15}	—	April 4, 2003	Kitt Peak	Spacewatch	·	780 m	MPC · JPL
732738	2014 KN_{17}	—	May 4, 2014	Mount Lemmon	Mount Lemmon Survey	·	1.5 km	MPC · JPL
732739	2014 KL_{20}	—	December 21, 2006	Kitt Peak	L. H. Wasserman, M. W. Buie	·	5.0 km	MPC · JPL
732740	2014 KB_{22}	—	March 10, 2003	Palomar	NEAT	T_{j} (2.98)	4.5 km	MPC · JPL
732741	2014 KO_{25}	—	February 26, 2003	Campo Imperatore	CINEOS	·	780 m	MPC · JPL
732742	2014 KE_{28}	—	February 2, 2008	Kitt Peak	Spacewatch	EOS	1.9 km	MPC · JPL
732743	2014 KD_{29}	—	January 31, 2009	Kitt Peak	Spacewatch	·	1.2 km	MPC · JPL
732744	2014 KK_{30}	—	May 21, 2001	Kitt Peak	Spacewatch	·	1.6 km	MPC · JPL
732745	2014 KJ_{33}	—	May 22, 2014	Haleakala	Pan-STARRS 1	·	1.4 km	MPC · JPL
732746	2014 KK_{33}	—	October 26, 2011	Haleakala	Pan-STARRS 1	·	1.6 km	MPC · JPL
732747	2014 KJ_{34}	—	January 18, 2004	Palomar	NEAT	BRU	2.9 km	MPC · JPL
732748	2014 KN_{34}	—	April 24, 2003	Kitt Peak	Spacewatch	·	3.0 km	MPC · JPL
732749	2014 KE_{35}	—	September 19, 2006	Kitt Peak	Spacewatch	·	1.5 km	MPC · JPL
732750	2014 KG_{36}	—	May 24, 2014	Mount Lemmon	Mount Lemmon Survey	·	1.0 km	MPC · JPL
732751	2014 KP_{37}	—	October 24, 2003	Kitt Peak	Spacewatch	MAR	1.2 km	MPC · JPL
732752	2014 KX_{41}	—	April 1, 2003	Apache Point	SDSS Collaboration	·	3.2 km	MPC · JPL
732753	2014 KE_{43}	—	May 7, 2014	Haleakala	Pan-STARRS 1	·	2.0 km	MPC · JPL
732754	2014 KE_{44}	—	November 4, 2005	Mount Lemmon	Mount Lemmon Survey	·	3.3 km	MPC · JPL
732755	2014 KO_{47}	—	February 19, 2010	Mount Lemmon	Mount Lemmon Survey	NYS	970 m	MPC · JPL
732756	2014 KR_{49}	—	November 2, 2007	Kitt Peak	Spacewatch	·	1.5 km	MPC · JPL
732757	2014 KQ_{52}	—	May 7, 2014	Haleakala	Pan-STARRS 1	·	2.6 km	MPC · JPL
732758	2014 KL_{56}	—	May 24, 2014	Mount Lemmon	Mount Lemmon Survey	·	880 m	MPC · JPL
732759	2014 KQ_{57}	—	September 19, 1998	Apache Point	SDSS Collaboration	MAR	1.3 km	MPC · JPL
732760	2014 KU_{60}	—	July 10, 2010	WISE	WISE	ARM	3.1 km	MPC · JPL
732761	2014 KT_{61}	—	September 30, 2006	Mount Lemmon	Mount Lemmon Survey	·	2.3 km	MPC · JPL
732762	2014 KF_{64}	—	February 27, 2009	Kitt Peak	Spacewatch	·	1.2 km	MPC · JPL
732763	2014 KH_{66}	—	December 31, 2005	Mount Lemmon	Mount Lemmon Survey	·	2.5 km	MPC · JPL
732764	2014 KU_{69}	—	July 31, 2010	WISE	WISE	·	2.0 km	MPC · JPL
732765	2014 KV_{74}	—	June 17, 2005	Mount Lemmon	Mount Lemmon Survey	·	4.0 km	MPC · JPL
732766	2014 KN_{75}	—	September 4, 2011	Haleakala	Pan-STARRS 1	·	1.2 km	MPC · JPL
732767	2014 KC_{77}	—	January 31, 2009	Mount Lemmon	Mount Lemmon Survey	·	1.8 km	MPC · JPL
732768	2014 KF_{77}	—	March 29, 2009	Kitt Peak	Spacewatch	PAD	1.4 km	MPC · JPL
732769	2014 KO_{77}	—	February 24, 2009	Kitt Peak	Spacewatch	NEM	1.9 km	MPC · JPL
732770	2014 KV_{77}	—	September 28, 2003	Apache Point	SDSS Collaboration	·	1.4 km	MPC · JPL
732771	2014 KD_{85}	—	September 28, 2006	Kitt Peak	Spacewatch	·	3.9 km	MPC · JPL
732772	2014 KF_{87}	—	December 9, 2006	Kitt Peak	Spacewatch	·	2.7 km	MPC · JPL
732773	2014 KN_{87}	—	July 5, 2010	WISE	WISE	·	3.0 km	MPC · JPL
732774	2014 KL_{89}	—	October 5, 2002	Apache Point	SDSS Collaboration	·	1.5 km	MPC · JPL
732775	2014 KA_{90}	—	May 23, 2010	WISE	WISE	MAR	1.5 km	MPC · JPL
732776	2014 KB_{90}	—	May 30, 2014	Mount Lemmon	Mount Lemmon Survey	PHO	860 m	MPC · JPL
732777	2014 KK_{90}	—	August 19, 1995	La Silla	C.-I. Lagerkvist	·	1.7 km	MPC · JPL
732778	2014 KT_{90}	—	September 30, 2010	Mount Lemmon	Mount Lemmon Survey	·	1.7 km	MPC · JPL
732779	2014 KU_{91}	—	June 14, 2010	Mount Lemmon	Mount Lemmon Survey	·	1.5 km	MPC · JPL
732780	2014 KJ_{92}	—	January 15, 2010	WISE	WISE	·	3.5 km	MPC · JPL
732781	2014 KR_{92}	—	September 15, 2006	Kitt Peak	Spacewatch	MIS	2.4 km	MPC · JPL
732782	2014 KK_{93}	—	September 26, 2003	Apache Point	SDSS Collaboration	·	780 m	MPC · JPL
732783	2014 KE_{94}	—	March 20, 2001	Anderson Mesa	LONEOS	·	1.9 km	MPC · JPL
732784	2014 KG_{96}	—	May 29, 2010	WISE	WISE	TRE	2.2 km	MPC · JPL
732785	2014 KZ_{96}	—	May 7, 2014	Haleakala	Pan-STARRS 1	·	2.5 km	MPC · JPL
732786	2014 KD_{98}	—	June 29, 2010	WISE	WISE	·	2.2 km	MPC · JPL
732787	2014 KV_{103}	—	July 14, 2010	WISE	WISE	·	2.9 km	MPC · JPL
732788	2014 KP_{104}	—	September 3, 2010	Mount Lemmon	Mount Lemmon Survey	GEF	1.0 km	MPC · JPL
732789	2014 KX_{104}	—	October 4, 2011	Piszkés-tető	K. Sárneczky, S. Kürti	·	1.8 km	MPC · JPL
732790	2014 KX_{105}	—	May 19, 2014	Haleakala	Pan-STARRS 1	·	1.5 km	MPC · JPL
732791	2014 KZ_{105}	—	May 23, 2014	Haleakala	Pan-STARRS 1	·	1.3 km	MPC · JPL
732792	2014 KK_{106}	—	May 25, 2014	Haleakala	Pan-STARRS 1	·	1.1 km	MPC · JPL
732793	2014 KL_{108}	—	May 21, 2014	Haleakala	Pan-STARRS 1	·	1.7 km	MPC · JPL
732794	2014 KQ_{108}	—	May 21, 2014	Haleakala	Pan-STARRS 1	·	1.2 km	MPC · JPL
732795	2014 KU_{108}	—	March 19, 2009	Kitt Peak	Spacewatch	·	1.5 km	MPC · JPL
732796	2014 KV_{109}	—	May 23, 2014	Haleakala	Pan-STARRS 1	·	1.4 km	MPC · JPL
732797	2014 KP_{110}	—	May 24, 2014	Haleakala	Pan-STARRS 1	·	1.5 km	MPC · JPL
732798	2014 KS_{110}	—	May 7, 2014	Haleakala	Pan-STARRS 1	·	1.2 km	MPC · JPL
732799	2014 KP_{111}	—	May 26, 2014	Haleakala	Pan-STARRS 1	·	1.6 km	MPC · JPL
732800	2014 KW_{112}	—	May 24, 2014	Haleakala	Pan-STARRS 1	·	1.8 km	MPC · JPL

== 732801–732900 ==
back to top

Designation			Discovery			Properties		Ref
Permanent	Provisional	Named after	Date	Site	Discoverer(s)	Category	Diam.	Ref
732801	2014 KY_{112}	—	July 1, 2010	WISE	WISE	·	3.8 km	MPC · JPL
732802	2014 KA_{114}	—	July 9, 2010	WISE	WISE	T_{j} (2.99) · (895)	3.7 km	MPC · JPL
732803	2014 KD_{114}	—	June 23, 2010	WISE	WISE	LUT	3.8 km	MPC · JPL
732804	2014 KC_{118}	—	July 12, 2010	WISE	WISE	ARM	3.3 km	MPC · JPL
732805	2014 KD_{133}	—	June 4, 2013	Mount Lemmon	Mount Lemmon Survey	·	2.2 km	MPC · JPL
732806	2014 KG_{133}	—	May 21, 2014	Haleakala	Pan-STARRS 1	AGN	970 m	MPC · JPL
732807	2014 KM_{133}	—	May 20, 2014	Haleakala	Pan-STARRS 1	·	1.4 km	MPC · JPL
732808	2014 KF_{135}	—	May 23, 2014	Haleakala	Pan-STARRS 1	·	1.5 km	MPC · JPL
732809	2014 KB_{144}	—	January 19, 2013	Mount Lemmon	Mount Lemmon Survey	·	1.3 km	MPC · JPL
732810	2014 KP_{146}	—	May 23, 2014	Haleakala	Pan-STARRS 1	·	1.3 km	MPC · JPL
732811	2014 LN	—	May 11, 2005	Catalina	CSS	·	2.9 km	MPC · JPL
732812	2014 LP_{1}	—	April 20, 2010	WISE	WISE	·	1.5 km	MPC · JPL
732813	2014 LO_{2}	—	January 17, 2013	Haleakala	Pan-STARRS 1	·	1.2 km	MPC · JPL
732814	2014 LY_{2}	—	November 13, 2007	Mount Lemmon	Mount Lemmon Survey	(5)	1.2 km	MPC · JPL
732815	2014 LF_{7}	—	December 18, 2007	Mount Lemmon	Mount Lemmon Survey	·	1.7 km	MPC · JPL
732816	2014 LN_{7}	—	May 11, 2010	WISE	WISE	·	700 m	MPC · JPL
732817	2014 LW_{8}	—	February 14, 2013	Haleakala	Pan-STARRS 1	·	1.8 km	MPC · JPL
732818	2014 LE_{10}	—	September 27, 2006	Catalina	CSS	·	2.0 km	MPC · JPL
732819	2014 LH_{15}	—	September 23, 2000	Anderson Mesa	LONEOS	·	3.6 km	MPC · JPL
732820	2014 LS_{16}	—	May 16, 2010	WISE	WISE	·	1.7 km	MPC · JPL
732821 Raycarlberg	2014 LF_{22}	Raycarlberg	November 25, 2005	Mauna Kea	P. A. Wiegert, D. D. Balam	·	2.9 km	MPC · JPL
732822	2014 LV_{22}	—	September 27, 2005	Palomar	NEAT	·	3.4 km	MPC · JPL
732823	2014 LZ_{25}	—	September 15, 2007	Mount Lemmon	Mount Lemmon Survey	EUP	4.4 km	MPC · JPL
732824	2014 LT_{26}	—	August 16, 1982	Siding Spring	Lowe, A.	·	3.7 km	MPC · JPL
732825	2014 LE_{28}	—	September 7, 1996	Kitt Peak	Spacewatch	·	1.6 km	MPC · JPL
732826	2014 LK_{28}	—	January 12, 2010	WISE	WISE	T_{j} (2.98) · EUP	4.2 km	MPC · JPL
732827	2014 LZ_{29}	—	June 6, 2014	Haleakala	Pan-STARRS 1	·	1.7 km	MPC · JPL
732828	2014 LB_{30}	—	June 5, 2014	Haleakala	Pan-STARRS 1	·	1.3 km	MPC · JPL
732829	2014 LC_{30}	—	January 22, 2013	Mount Lemmon	Mount Lemmon Survey	·	1.8 km	MPC · JPL
732830	2014 LE_{30}	—	June 6, 2014	Haleakala	Pan-STARRS 1	EUN	960 m	MPC · JPL
732831	2014 LF_{30}	—	June 3, 2014	Haleakala	Pan-STARRS 1	EOS	1.7 km	MPC · JPL
732832	2014 MC_{1}	—	October 16, 2012	Catalina	CSS	H	540 m	MPC · JPL
732833	2014 MX_{4}	—	June 20, 2014	Haleakala	Pan-STARRS 1	·	1.5 km	MPC · JPL
732834	2014 MU_{6}	—	May 9, 2014	Haleakala	Pan-STARRS 1	HNS	980 m	MPC · JPL
732835	2014 MF_{8}	—	May 1, 2010	WISE	WISE	·	1.4 km	MPC · JPL
732836	2014 MK_{12}	—	June 21, 2014	Mount Lemmon	Mount Lemmon Survey	·	2.0 km	MPC · JPL
732837	2014 MN_{12}	—	May 16, 2009	Kitt Peak	Spacewatch	DOR	2.0 km	MPC · JPL
732838	2014 MG_{13}	—	October 15, 2001	Palomar	NEAT	·	2.0 km	MPC · JPL
732839	2014 MJ_{14}	—	July 18, 2010	WISE	WISE	VER	3.0 km	MPC · JPL
732840	2014 ML_{15}	—	May 23, 2014	Haleakala	Pan-STARRS 1	·	1.6 km	MPC · JPL
732841	2014 MV_{15}	—	September 30, 2006	Catalina	CSS	·	1.5 km	MPC · JPL
732842	2014 MS_{19}	—	January 15, 2009	Kitt Peak	Spacewatch	·	1.1 km	MPC · JPL
732843	2014 MZ_{19}	—	July 12, 2010	WISE	WISE	·	2.7 km	MPC · JPL
732844	2014 MS_{21}	—	September 24, 2011	Haleakala	Pan-STARRS 1	·	2.1 km	MPC · JPL
732845	2014 MN_{22}	—	August 25, 1995	La Silla	C.-I. Lagerkvist	MAS	1.0 km	MPC · JPL
732846	2014 MX_{23}	—	August 31, 2005	Kitt Peak	Spacewatch	HOF	3.1 km	MPC · JPL
732847	2014 MG_{24}	—	September 2, 2010	Mount Lemmon	Mount Lemmon Survey	·	1.4 km	MPC · JPL
732848	2014 MX_{24}	—	March 26, 2006	Kitt Peak	Spacewatch	NYS	1.0 km	MPC · JPL
732849	2014 MD_{25}	—	January 8, 2010	WISE	WISE	·	2.0 km	MPC · JPL
732850	2014 MA_{27}	—	November 7, 2012	Haleakala	Pan-STARRS 1	·	2.0 km	MPC · JPL
732851	2014 MG_{28}	—	September 28, 2011	Kitt Peak	Spacewatch	·	570 m	MPC · JPL
732852	2014 MV_{28}	—	May 7, 2014	Haleakala	Pan-STARRS 1	·	890 m	MPC · JPL
732853	2014 MO_{29}	—	May 16, 2010	WISE	WISE	·	770 m	MPC · JPL
732854	2014 MV_{30}	—	July 13, 2010	WISE	WISE	·	3.1 km	MPC · JPL
732855	2014 MW_{32}	—	June 26, 2010	WISE	WISE	·	2.3 km	MPC · JPL
732856	2014 MA_{35}	—	December 23, 2012	Haleakala	Pan-STARRS 1	EUN	990 m	MPC · JPL
732857	2014 MG_{36}	—	May 27, 2010	WISE	WISE	·	1.5 km	MPC · JPL
732858	2014 MN_{36}	—	October 30, 2006	Mount Lemmon	Mount Lemmon Survey	·	5.0 km	MPC · JPL
732859	2014 MN_{40}	—	June 29, 2010	WISE	WISE	·	2.2 km	MPC · JPL
732860	2014 MK_{42}	—	July 25, 2010	WISE	WISE	·	3.2 km	MPC · JPL
732861	2014 MA_{44}	—	July 8, 2005	Kitt Peak	Spacewatch	·	1.7 km	MPC · JPL
732862	2014 MO_{44}	—	January 18, 2008	Mount Lemmon	Mount Lemmon Survey	·	2.6 km	MPC · JPL
732863	2014 ME_{45}	—	March 11, 2008	Mount Lemmon	Mount Lemmon Survey	·	2.4 km	MPC · JPL
732864	2014 MX_{46}	—	June 21, 2010	WISE	WISE	·	3.6 km	MPC · JPL
732865	2014 MD_{48}	—	December 1, 2011	Haleakala	Pan-STARRS 1	·	1.7 km	MPC · JPL
732866	2014 MC_{49}	—	January 18, 2004	Kitt Peak	Spacewatch	·	2.4 km	MPC · JPL
732867	2014 MW_{49}	—	September 7, 2004	Kitt Peak	Spacewatch	·	4.7 km	MPC · JPL
732868	2014 MZ_{53}	—	October 15, 2001	Palomar	NEAT	·	2.5 km	MPC · JPL
732869	2014 MS_{59}	—	October 16, 2003	Kitt Peak	Spacewatch	·	1.7 km	MPC · JPL
732870	2014 MJ_{62}	—	June 28, 2014	Kitt Peak	Spacewatch	·	1.7 km	MPC · JPL
732871	2014 MU_{68}	—	April 14, 2010	Mount Lemmon	Mount Lemmon Survey	·	1.2 km	MPC · JPL
732872	2014 MC_{69}	—	January 23, 2006	Kitt Peak	Spacewatch	·	1.2 km	MPC · JPL
732873	2014 MM_{72}	—	August 8, 2004	Palomar	NEAT	·	1.8 km	MPC · JPL
732874	2014 MM_{87}	—	June 27, 2014	Haleakala	Pan-STARRS 1	·	1.3 km	MPC · JPL
732875	2014 ME_{88}	—	June 27, 2014	Haleakala	Pan-STARRS 1	·	1.2 km	MPC · JPL
732876	2014 MP_{94}	—	June 28, 2014	Haleakala	Pan-STARRS 1	·	1.9 km	MPC · JPL
732877	2014 MS_{101}	—	June 21, 2014	Haleakala	Pan-STARRS 1	·	1.1 km	MPC · JPL
732878	2014 MP_{105}	—	June 27, 2014	Haleakala	Pan-STARRS 1	·	990 m	MPC · JPL
732879	2014 NY	—	July 25, 2006	Palomar	NEAT	·	2.4 km	MPC · JPL
732880	2014 NO_{3}	—	January 28, 2004	Kitt Peak	Spacewatch	·	1.8 km	MPC · JPL
732881	2014 NT_{3}	—	May 16, 2009	Mount Lemmon	Mount Lemmon Survey	·	1.3 km	MPC · JPL
732882	2014 NU_{3}	—	August 26, 2005	Palomar	NEAT	·	1.9 km	MPC · JPL
732883	2014 NZ_{6}	—	December 28, 2005	Kitt Peak	Spacewatch	·	2.8 km	MPC · JPL
732884	2014 NZ_{9}	—	November 13, 2010	Mount Lemmon	Mount Lemmon Survey	·	2.1 km	MPC · JPL
732885	2014 NQ_{15}	—	October 25, 2011	Haleakala	Pan-STARRS 1	·	1.1 km	MPC · JPL
732886	2014 NU_{17}	—	June 24, 2014	Mount Lemmon	Mount Lemmon Survey	·	1.2 km	MPC · JPL
732887	2014 NK_{24}	—	June 29, 2014	Mount Lemmon	Mount Lemmon Survey	·	1.2 km	MPC · JPL
732888	2014 NQ_{25}	—	September 17, 2010	Mount Lemmon	Mount Lemmon Survey	NEM	1.8 km	MPC · JPL
732889	2014 NS_{28}	—	May 2, 2001	Kitt Peak	Spacewatch	·	970 m	MPC · JPL
732890	2014 NM_{30}	—	September 4, 2008	Kitt Peak	Spacewatch	3:2	5.4 km	MPC · JPL
732891	2014 NR_{33}	—	October 9, 2010	Mount Lemmon	Mount Lemmon Survey	AGN	970 m	MPC · JPL
732892	2014 NZ_{41}	—	August 11, 2001	Palomar	NEAT	·	2.3 km	MPC · JPL
732893	2014 NH_{42}	—	April 5, 2005	Mount Lemmon	Mount Lemmon Survey	·	2.1 km	MPC · JPL
732894	2014 NB_{44}	—	September 3, 2002	Palomar	NEAT	·	1.6 km	MPC · JPL
732895	2014 NK_{47}	—	March 4, 2013	Haleakala	Pan-STARRS 1	·	1.8 km	MPC · JPL
732896	2014 NU_{55}	—	February 9, 2003	Palomar	NEAT	·	3.1 km	MPC · JPL
732897	2014 NG_{56}	—	July 27, 2001	Palomar	NEAT	·	1.9 km	MPC · JPL
732898	2014 NK_{56}	—	June 9, 2010	WISE	WISE	·	2.3 km	MPC · JPL
732899	2014 NQ_{56}	—	March 6, 2008	Mount Lemmon	Mount Lemmon Survey	·	1.8 km	MPC · JPL
732900	2014 NO_{60}	—	January 15, 2010	WISE	WISE	·	4.2 km	MPC · JPL

== 732901–733000 ==
back to top

Designation			Discovery			Properties		Ref
Permanent	Provisional	Named after	Date	Site	Discoverer(s)	Category	Diam.	Ref
732901	2014 NW_{60}	—	July 7, 2014	Haleakala	Pan-STARRS 1	NYS	930 m	MPC · JPL
732902	2014 NL_{63}	—	January 17, 2010	WISE	WISE	T_{j} (2.93)	4.0 km	MPC · JPL
732903	2014 NW_{63}	—	August 7, 2008	Črni Vrh	J. Vales, H. Mikuž	EUP	3.9 km	MPC · JPL
732904	2014 ND_{66}	—	July 14, 2010	WISE	WISE	HOF	2.1 km	MPC · JPL
732905	2014 NN_{67}	—	July 2, 2014	Haleakala	Pan-STARRS 1	·	1.4 km	MPC · JPL
732906	2014 NU_{67}	—	January 7, 2010	WISE	WISE	·	3.8 km	MPC · JPL
732907	2014 NJ_{68}	—	October 5, 2005	Mount Lemmon	Mount Lemmon Survey	AGN	950 m	MPC · JPL
732908	2014 NM_{71}	—	February 16, 2012	Haleakala	Pan-STARRS 1	·	1.8 km	MPC · JPL
732909	2014 NU_{79}	—	July 7, 2014	Haleakala	Pan-STARRS 1	·	690 m	MPC · JPL
732910	2014 NO_{96}	—	July 1, 2014	Haleakala	Pan-STARRS 1	·	1.1 km	MPC · JPL
732911	2014 OH_{1}	—	July 2, 2014	Haleakala	Pan-STARRS 1	·	1.3 km	MPC · JPL
732912	2014 OL_{2}	—	November 17, 2006	Kitt Peak	Spacewatch	·	1.5 km	MPC · JPL
732913	2014 OJ_{3}	—	April 17, 2010	Kitt Peak	Spacewatch	·	800 m	MPC · JPL
732914	2014 OL_{4}	—	January 27, 2012	Mount Lemmon	Mount Lemmon Survey	·	1.7 km	MPC · JPL
732915	2014 OV_{6}	—	October 2, 2005	Mount Lemmon	Mount Lemmon Survey	KOR	1.2 km	MPC · JPL
732916	2014 OH_{7}	—	August 1, 2000	Cerro Tololo	Deep Ecliptic Survey	·	2.4 km	MPC · JPL
732917	2014 OF_{9}	—	March 25, 2010	Mount Lemmon	Mount Lemmon Survey	·	610 m	MPC · JPL
732918	2014 OX_{12}	—	December 19, 2004	Mount Lemmon	Mount Lemmon Survey	·	4.2 km	MPC · JPL
732919	2014 ON_{14}	—	July 25, 2014	Haleakala	Pan-STARRS 1	·	1.5 km	MPC · JPL
732920	2014 OT_{16}	—	April 16, 2013	Cerro Tololo-DECam	DECam	KOR	920 m	MPC · JPL
732921	2014 OZ_{16}	—	August 26, 2011	Haleakala	Pan-STARRS 1	·	630 m	MPC · JPL
732922	2014 OZ_{17}	—	January 28, 2004	Kitt Peak	Spacewatch	·	2.3 km	MPC · JPL
732923	2014 OM_{18}	—	July 2, 2014	Haleakala	Pan-STARRS 1	·	1.3 km	MPC · JPL
732924	2014 OF_{22}	—	June 13, 2005	Kitt Peak	Spacewatch	EUN	860 m	MPC · JPL
732925	2014 OA_{25}	—	July 25, 2014	Haleakala	Pan-STARRS 1	·	430 m	MPC · JPL
732926	2014 OE_{26}	—	August 26, 2005	Palomar	NEAT	HOF	2.8 km	MPC · JPL
732927	2014 OF_{26}	—	May 18, 2010	WISE	WISE	·	2.5 km	MPC · JPL
732928	2014 OV_{27}	—	March 21, 2009	Mount Lemmon	Mount Lemmon Survey	·	1.1 km	MPC · JPL
732929	2014 OQ_{31}	—	January 20, 2012	Mount Lemmon	Mount Lemmon Survey	·	1.7 km	MPC · JPL
732930	2014 OY_{31}	—	July 25, 2014	Haleakala	Pan-STARRS 1	·	1.3 km	MPC · JPL
732931	2014 OA_{32}	—	January 13, 2008	Kitt Peak	Spacewatch	PAD	1.5 km	MPC · JPL
732932	2014 OA_{38}	—	October 8, 2010	Kitt Peak	Spacewatch	AGN	980 m	MPC · JPL
732933	2014 OW_{38}	—	June 27, 2014	Haleakala	Pan-STARRS 1	KOR	1.1 km	MPC · JPL
732934	2014 OO_{39}	—	July 25, 2014	Haleakala	Pan-STARRS 1	KOR	950 m	MPC · JPL
732935	2014 OS_{42}	—	July 25, 2014	Haleakala	Pan-STARRS 1	AGN	790 m	MPC · JPL
732936	2014 OW_{45}	—	June 27, 2014	Haleakala	Pan-STARRS 1	·	1.5 km	MPC · JPL
732937	2014 OU_{47}	—	January 19, 2007	Mauna Kea	P. A. Wiegert	·	1.6 km	MPC · JPL
732938	2014 OW_{49}	—	July 3, 2014	Haleakala	Pan-STARRS 1	·	1.4 km	MPC · JPL
732939	2014 OE_{50}	—	October 5, 2005	Junk Bond	D. Healy	KOR	1.1 km	MPC · JPL
732940	2014 OH_{52}	—	August 24, 2011	Haleakala	Pan-STARRS 1	·	560 m	MPC · JPL
732941	2014 OY_{53}	—	June 27, 2014	Haleakala	Pan-STARRS 1	·	1.7 km	MPC · JPL
732942	2014 OO_{55}	—	July 25, 2014	Haleakala	Pan-STARRS 1	·	1.4 km	MPC · JPL
732943	2014 OQ_{57}	—	March 8, 2013	Haleakala	Pan-STARRS 1	·	950 m	MPC · JPL
732944	2014 OR_{57}	—	July 25, 2014	Haleakala	Pan-STARRS 1	·	810 m	MPC · JPL
732945	2014 OL_{60}	—	July 25, 2014	Haleakala	Pan-STARRS 1	BRA	1.4 km	MPC · JPL
732946	2014 OT_{60}	—	July 25, 2014	Haleakala	Pan-STARRS 1	PAD	1.6 km	MPC · JPL
732947	2014 OX_{61}	—	July 25, 2014	Haleakala	Pan-STARRS 1	·	1.4 km	MPC · JPL
732948	2014 OJ_{62}	—	August 29, 2005	Kitt Peak	Spacewatch	·	1.5 km	MPC · JPL
732949	2014 OM_{62}	—	July 25, 2014	Haleakala	Pan-STARRS 1	·	1.5 km	MPC · JPL
732950	2014 OF_{64}	—	May 21, 2005	Mount Lemmon	Mount Lemmon Survey	ADE	2.6 km	MPC · JPL
732951	2014 OF_{70}	—	October 22, 2006	Kitt Peak	Spacewatch	·	1.1 km	MPC · JPL
732952	2014 OX_{70}	—	September 26, 2005	Palomar	NEAT	·	1.8 km	MPC · JPL
732953	2014 OR_{72}	—	October 23, 2006	Kitt Peak	Spacewatch	·	1.6 km	MPC · JPL
732954	2014 OU_{73}	—	October 15, 2001	Palomar	NEAT	·	3.1 km	MPC · JPL
732955	2014 OB_{74}	—	January 17, 2013	Haleakala	Pan-STARRS 1	·	980 m	MPC · JPL
732956	2014 ON_{74}	—	June 27, 2014	Haleakala	Pan-STARRS 1	·	1.2 km	MPC · JPL
732957	2014 OR_{75}	—	July 3, 2014	Haleakala	Pan-STARRS 1	KOR	930 m	MPC · JPL
732958	2014 OV_{79}	—	February 13, 2004	Kitt Peak	Spacewatch	·	2.8 km	MPC · JPL
732959	2014 OQ_{80}	—	July 26, 2014	Haleakala	Pan-STARRS 1	·	1.5 km	MPC · JPL
732960	2014 OD_{84}	—	May 16, 2010	WISE	WISE	(5)	1.4 km	MPC · JPL
732961	2014 OT_{84}	—	June 20, 2014	Haleakala	Pan-STARRS 1	·	1.8 km	MPC · JPL
732962	2014 OH_{88}	—	October 1, 2010	Mount Lemmon	Mount Lemmon Survey	·	1.4 km	MPC · JPL
732963	2014 OB_{90}	—	February 27, 2008	Mount Lemmon	Mount Lemmon Survey	·	1.6 km	MPC · JPL
732964	2014 OX_{93}	—	July 2, 2014	Haleakala	Pan-STARRS 1	WIT	730 m	MPC · JPL
732965	2014 OX_{96}	—	August 27, 2006	Lulin	LUSS	·	1.5 km	MPC · JPL
732966	2014 ON_{99}	—	August 5, 2010	Kitt Peak	Spacewatch	·	1.1 km	MPC · JPL
732967	2014 OV_{99}	—	September 20, 2003	Palomar	NEAT	·	4.6 km	MPC · JPL
732968	2014 OY_{100}	—	March 16, 2012	Mount Lemmon	Mount Lemmon Survey	·	2.0 km	MPC · JPL
732969	2014 OV_{102}	—	April 14, 2008	Mount Lemmon	Mount Lemmon Survey	·	1.8 km	MPC · JPL
732970	2014 OM_{106}	—	October 14, 2001	Apache Point	SDSS Collaboration	·	570 m	MPC · JPL
732971	2014 OA_{110}	—	July 27, 2014	Haleakala	Pan-STARRS 1	·	1.6 km	MPC · JPL
732972	2014 OC_{118}	—	March 1, 2008	Mount Lemmon	Mount Lemmon Survey	·	1.7 km	MPC · JPL
732973	2014 ON_{118}	—	January 27, 2012	Mount Lemmon	Mount Lemmon Survey	·	1.1 km	MPC · JPL
732974	2014 OK_{122}	—	June 27, 2014	Haleakala	Pan-STARRS 1	·	1.3 km	MPC · JPL
732975	2014 OC_{123}	—	May 27, 2014	Mount Lemmon	Mount Lemmon Survey	ADE	1.5 km	MPC · JPL
732976	2014 OA_{124}	—	July 25, 2014	Haleakala	Pan-STARRS 1	·	1.6 km	MPC · JPL
732977	2014 OA_{126}	—	February 11, 2008	Kitt Peak	Spacewatch	NEM	1.9 km	MPC · JPL
732978	2014 OM_{126}	—	June 27, 2014	Haleakala	Pan-STARRS 1	TRE	1.9 km	MPC · JPL
732979	2014 OV_{128}	—	September 17, 2010	Mount Lemmon	Mount Lemmon Survey	·	1.5 km	MPC · JPL
732980	2014 OU_{129}	—	October 16, 2006	Kitt Peak	Spacewatch	·	1.4 km	MPC · JPL
732981	2014 ON_{130}	—	November 16, 2010	Westfield	International Astronomical Search Collaboration	·	1.9 km	MPC · JPL
732982	2014 OT_{130}	—	July 27, 2014	ESA OGS	ESA OGS	·	1.5 km	MPC · JPL
732983	2014 OH_{133}	—	September 10, 2010	Mount Lemmon	Mount Lemmon Survey	NEM	1.7 km	MPC · JPL
732984	2014 OT_{133}	—	November 10, 2010	Mount Lemmon	Mount Lemmon Survey	KOR	980 m	MPC · JPL
732985	2014 OO_{135}	—	July 27, 2014	Haleakala	Pan-STARRS 1	·	570 m	MPC · JPL
732986	2014 OF_{139}	—	February 15, 2013	Haleakala	Pan-STARRS 1	·	1.1 km	MPC · JPL
732987	2014 OQ_{140}	—	July 27, 2014	Haleakala	Pan-STARRS 1	·	1.5 km	MPC · JPL
732988	2014 OA_{143}	—	June 27, 2014	Haleakala	Pan-STARRS 1	·	2.0 km	MPC · JPL
732989	2014 OV_{148}	—	September 30, 2005	Mount Lemmon	Mount Lemmon Survey	KOR	950 m	MPC · JPL
732990	2014 OY_{148}	—	February 2, 2008	Kitt Peak	Spacewatch	·	1.4 km	MPC · JPL
732991	2014 OE_{152}	—	September 11, 2004	Kitt Peak	Spacewatch	EOS	1.4 km	MPC · JPL
732992	2014 OX_{152}	—	March 26, 2003	Kitt Peak	Spacewatch	·	690 m	MPC · JPL
732993	2014 OL_{154}	—	June 26, 2014	Haleakala	Pan-STARRS 1	AGN	1.1 km	MPC · JPL
732994	2014 OS_{154}	—	July 27, 2014	Haleakala	Pan-STARRS 1	·	1.5 km	MPC · JPL
732995	2014 OB_{157}	—	April 3, 2005	Palomar	NEAT	·	3.5 km	MPC · JPL
732996	2014 OL_{157}	—	August 24, 2011	Haleakala	Pan-STARRS 1	·	560 m	MPC · JPL
732997	2014 OM_{159}	—	July 27, 2014	Haleakala	Pan-STARRS 1	·	580 m	MPC · JPL
732998	2014 OG_{163}	—	June 6, 2010	WISE	WISE	·	1.4 km	MPC · JPL
732999	2014 OR_{163}	—	February 8, 2010	Kitt Peak	Spacewatch	·	1.6 km	MPC · JPL
733000	2014 OV_{164}	—	August 26, 2005	Palomar	NEAT	(13314)	1.6 km	MPC · JPL

back to top

== Meaning of names ==
As minor planet discoveries are confirmed, they are given a permanent number by the IAU's Minor Planet Center (MPC), and the discoverers can then submit names for them, following the IAU's naming conventions. The list below concerns those minor planets in the specified number-range that have received names, and explains the meanings of those names.

Official naming citations of newly named small Solar System bodies are approved and published in a bulletin by IAU's Working Group for Small Bodies Nomenclature (WGSBN). Before May 2021, citations were published in MPC's Minor Planet Circulars for many decades. Recent citations can also be found on the JPL Small-Body Database (SBDB). Until his death in 2016, German astronomer Lutz D. Schmadel compiled these citations into the Dictionary of Minor Planet Names (DMP) and regularly updated the collection.

Based on Paul Herget's The Names of the Minor Planets, Schmadel also researched the unclear origin of numerous asteroids, most of which had been named prior to World War II. This article incorporates text from this source, which is in the public domain: SBDB New namings may only be added to this list below after official publication as the preannouncement of names is condemned. The WGSBN publishes a comprehensive guideline for the naming rules of non-cometary small Solar System bodies.

Named minor planet	Provisional	This minor planet was named for...	Ref · Catalog
732272 Langejans	2014 CE_{24}	Geeske Henriëtte Janine Langejans, Dutch archaeologist.	IAU · 732272
732472 Grahamhill	2014 FM_{18}	Graham Hill (born 1936), Canadian and New Zealander former Research Scientist at the Dominion Astrophysical Observatory of the National Research Council of Canada.	IAU · 732472
732571 Jipa	2014 HZ_{8}	Alexandru Jipa, Romanian physicist and professor at the University of Bucharest.	IAU · 732571
732821 Raycarlberg	2014 LF_{22}	Raymond Carlberg (born 1951), Canadian Professor of Physics and Astronomy at the University of Toronto.	IAU · 732821
