= List of minor planets: 736001–737000 =

The following is a partial list of minor planets, running from minor-planet number 736001 through 737000, inclusive. The primary data for this and other partial lists is based on JPL's "Small-Body Orbital Elements" and data available from the Minor Planet Center. Critical list information is also provided by the MPC, unless otherwise specified from Lowell Observatory. A detailed description of the table's columns and additional sources are given on the main page including a complete list of every page in this series, and a statistical break-up on the dynamical classification of minor planets.

Also see the summary list of all named bodies in numerical and alphabetical order, and the corresponding naming citations for the number range of this particular list. New namings may only be added to this list after official publication, as the preannouncement of names is condemned by the Working Group for Small Bodies Nomenclature of the International Astronomical Union.

Near-Earth obj.	MBA (inner)	MBA (outer)	Centaur
Mars-crosser	MBA (middle)	Jupiter trojan	Trans-Neptunian obj.
Unclassified

== 736001–736100 ==
Designation			Discovery			Properties		Ref
Permanent	Provisional	Named after	Date	Site	Discoverer(s)	Category	Diam.	Ref
736001	2015 PO_{7}	—	October 24, 2003	Kitt Peak	Deep Ecliptic Survey	KON	2.4 km	MPC · JPL
736002	2015 PU_{7}	—	April 12, 2010	WISE	WISE	·	2.7 km	MPC · JPL
736003	2015 PF_{10}	—	February 23, 2010	WISE	WISE	·	2.0 km	MPC · JPL
736004	2015 PM_{12}	—	March 10, 2007	Mount Lemmon	Mount Lemmon Survey	·	2.7 km	MPC · JPL
736005	2015 PW_{13}	—	September 21, 2011	Mount Lemmon	Mount Lemmon Survey	·	1.2 km	MPC · JPL
736006	2015 PT_{14}	—	February 8, 2007	Mount Lemmon	Mount Lemmon Survey	·	3.3 km	MPC · JPL
736007	2015 PA_{16}	—	January 16, 2013	Haleakala	Pan-STARRS 1	EOS	1.6 km	MPC · JPL
736008	2015 PX_{17}	—	September 3, 2010	Mount Lemmon	Mount Lemmon Survey	·	3.2 km	MPC · JPL
736009	2015 PS_{18}	—	September 2, 2011	Haleakala	Pan-STARRS 1	·	1.4 km	MPC · JPL
736010	2015 PY_{18}	—	October 1, 2011	Kitt Peak	Spacewatch	·	1.7 km	MPC · JPL
736011	2015 PR_{19}	—	December 7, 2012	Kitt Peak	Spacewatch	·	1.3 km	MPC · JPL
736012	2015 PT_{20}	—	December 31, 2008	Mount Lemmon	Mount Lemmon Survey	·	1.7 km	MPC · JPL
736013	2015 PF_{23}	—	May 8, 2006	Mount Lemmon	Mount Lemmon Survey	3:2	6.8 km	MPC · JPL
736014	2015 PG_{23}	—	June 19, 2010	WISE	WISE	·	2.7 km	MPC · JPL
736015	2015 PS_{23}	—	September 8, 2011	Haleakala	Pan-STARRS 1	·	1.3 km	MPC · JPL
736016	2015 PR_{24}	—	March 24, 2003	Kitt Peak	Spacewatch	·	1.2 km	MPC · JPL
736017	2015 PO_{25}	—	September 4, 2011	Haleakala	Pan-STARRS 1	·	1.6 km	MPC · JPL
736018	2015 PV_{28}	—	July 25, 2015	Haleakala	Pan-STARRS 1	·	1.5 km	MPC · JPL
736019	2015 PA_{29}	—	December 30, 2008	Kitt Peak	Spacewatch	·	1.2 km	MPC · JPL
736020	2015 PG_{31}	—	September 21, 2011	Kitt Peak	Spacewatch	·	1.4 km	MPC · JPL
736021	2015 PH_{32}	—	July 23, 2015	Haleakala	Pan-STARRS 1	·	1.4 km	MPC · JPL
736022	2015 PT_{32}	—	February 2, 2014	ESA OGS	ESA OGS	(1547)	1.6 km	MPC · JPL
736023	2015 PV_{36}	—	August 31, 2005	Kitt Peak	Spacewatch	·	2.6 km	MPC · JPL
736024	2015 PS_{37}	—	November 18, 2007	Mount Lemmon	Mount Lemmon Survey	·	1.5 km	MPC · JPL
736025	2015 PO_{41}	—	October 22, 2003	Apache Point	SDSS Collaboration	KON	2.0 km	MPC · JPL
736026	2015 PH_{42}	—	May 3, 2011	Mount Lemmon	Mount Lemmon Survey	·	590 m	MPC · JPL
736027	2015 PR_{42}	—	April 6, 2014	Mount Lemmon	Mount Lemmon Survey	·	1.3 km	MPC · JPL
736028	2015 PY_{42}	—	September 23, 2011	Haleakala	Pan-STARRS 1	·	1.4 km	MPC · JPL
736029	2015 PF_{43}	—	December 13, 2006	Mount Lemmon	Mount Lemmon Survey	·	2.9 km	MPC · JPL
736030	2015 PH_{44}	—	May 9, 2006	Mount Lemmon	Mount Lemmon Survey	·	2.8 km	MPC · JPL
736031	2015 PN_{46}	—	February 1, 2013	Mount Lemmon	Mount Lemmon Survey	·	1.6 km	MPC · JPL
736032	2015 PS_{47}	—	May 30, 2008	Kitt Peak	Spacewatch	(5651)	3.1 km	MPC · JPL
736033	2015 PO_{49}	—	September 25, 2011	Haleakala	Pan-STARRS 1	·	1.6 km	MPC · JPL
736034	2015 PR_{49}	—	November 2, 2000	Kitt Peak	Spacewatch	·	3.3 km	MPC · JPL
736035	2015 PX_{49}	—	April 30, 2014	Haleakala	Pan-STARRS 1	WIT	860 m	MPC · JPL
736036	2015 PM_{50}	—	October 8, 1994	Kitt Peak	Spacewatch	·	1.2 km	MPC · JPL
736037	2015 PE_{51}	—	October 26, 2008	Mount Lemmon	Mount Lemmon Survey	T_{j} (2.96) · 3:2	6.2 km	MPC · JPL
736038	2015 PJ_{51}	—	June 17, 2015	Haleakala	Pan-STARRS 1	·	1.6 km	MPC · JPL
736039	2015 PO_{52}	—	August 31, 2005	Palomar	NEAT	·	2.0 km	MPC · JPL
736040	2015 PL_{53}	—	July 15, 2010	WISE	WISE	·	2.2 km	MPC · JPL
736041	2015 PP_{53}	—	March 31, 2008	Catalina	CSS	·	4.2 km	MPC · JPL
736042	2015 PX_{53}	—	October 19, 2003	Kitt Peak	Spacewatch	MAR	970 m	MPC · JPL
736043	2015 PK_{54}	—	September 23, 2011	Kitt Peak	Spacewatch	·	1.2 km	MPC · JPL
736044	2015 PM_{54}	—	January 30, 2008	Mount Lemmon	Mount Lemmon Survey	·	1.9 km	MPC · JPL
736045	2015 PF_{58}	—	September 27, 2011	Mount Lemmon	Mount Lemmon Survey	·	2.0 km	MPC · JPL
736046	2015 PJ_{58}	—	December 21, 2012	Mount Lemmon	Mount Lemmon Survey	·	1.3 km	MPC · JPL
736047	2015 PB_{61}	—	July 7, 2010	WISE	WISE	·	3.0 km	MPC · JPL
736048	2015 PN_{61}	—	October 20, 2007	Mount Lemmon	Mount Lemmon Survey	·	1.2 km	MPC · JPL
736049	2015 PF_{63}	—	November 23, 2006	Mount Lemmon	Mount Lemmon Survey	·	1.3 km	MPC · JPL
736050	2015 PB_{65}	—	June 23, 2015	Haleakala	Pan-STARRS 1	KOR	1.1 km	MPC · JPL
736051	2015 PV_{66}	—	October 12, 2007	Mount Lemmon	Mount Lemmon Survey	·	1.1 km	MPC · JPL
736052	2015 PC_{68}	—	October 10, 2007	Mount Lemmon	Mount Lemmon Survey	MIS	3.0 km	MPC · JPL
736053	2015 PE_{68}	—	January 22, 2002	Nogales	M. Schwartz, P. R. Holvorcem	EOS	1.4 km	MPC · JPL
736054	2015 PF_{68}	—	December 15, 2006	Kitt Peak	Spacewatch	·	4.4 km	MPC · JPL
736055	2015 PW_{68}	—	August 29, 2011	Siding Spring	SSS	(5)	1.1 km	MPC · JPL
736056	2015 PP_{70}	—	January 29, 2009	Kitt Peak	Spacewatch	·	1.3 km	MPC · JPL
736057	2015 PY_{74}	—	February 26, 2014	Haleakala	Pan-STARRS 1	·	1.1 km	MPC · JPL
736058	2015 PK_{77}	—	December 30, 2007	Kitt Peak	Spacewatch	·	1.6 km	MPC · JPL
736059	2015 PL_{83}	—	July 18, 2015	Haleakala	Pan-STARRS 1	·	1 km	MPC · JPL
736060	2015 PW_{85}	—	March 11, 2008	Mount Lemmon	Mount Lemmon Survey	·	2.5 km	MPC · JPL
736061	2015 PE_{86}	—	September 18, 2011	Mount Lemmon	Mount Lemmon Survey	·	1.1 km	MPC · JPL
736062	2015 PK_{87}	—	June 22, 2015	Mount Lemmon	Mount Lemmon Survey	·	1.1 km	MPC · JPL
736063	2015 PO_{90}	—	January 5, 2013	Mount Lemmon	Mount Lemmon Survey	·	1.0 km	MPC · JPL
736064	2015 PA_{95}	—	January 28, 2014	Kitt Peak	Spacewatch	MAS	630 m	MPC · JPL
736065	2015 PA_{96}	—	August 10, 2015	Haleakala	Pan-STARRS 1	HOF	1.9 km	MPC · JPL
736066	2015 PD_{98}	—	March 13, 2007	Mount Lemmon	Mount Lemmon Survey	NYS	890 m	MPC · JPL
736067	2015 PQ_{98}	—	October 16, 2007	Mount Lemmon	Mount Lemmon Survey	·	1.2 km	MPC · JPL
736068	2015 PK_{99}	—	February 10, 2010	WISE	WISE	·	1.6 km	MPC · JPL
736069	2015 PL_{101}	—	April 1, 2003	Apache Point	SDSS Collaboration	·	2.4 km	MPC · JPL
736070	2015 PL_{103}	—	June 20, 2015	Haleakala	Pan-STARRS 2	MAR	1.1 km	MPC · JPL
736071	2015 PN_{103}	—	May 23, 2006	Kitt Peak	Spacewatch	KON	2.0 km	MPC · JPL
736072	2015 PZ_{104}	—	February 27, 2014	Catalina	CSS	·	1.3 km	MPC · JPL
736073	2015 PB_{105}	—	January 31, 2009	Mount Lemmon	Mount Lemmon Survey	·	1.2 km	MPC · JPL
736074	2015 PE_{106}	—	June 23, 2015	Haleakala	Pan-STARRS 1	·	1.2 km	MPC · JPL
736075	2015 PY_{109}	—	July 19, 2015	Haleakala	Pan-STARRS 2	·	2.6 km	MPC · JPL
736076	2015 PP_{111}	—	July 10, 2010	WISE	WISE	·	3.2 km	MPC · JPL
736077	2015 PX_{114}	—	November 3, 2007	Kitt Peak	Spacewatch	(12739)	1.4 km	MPC · JPL
736078	2015 PU_{115}	—	July 18, 2015	Haleakala	Pan-STARRS 1	·	1.5 km	MPC · JPL
736079	2015 PE_{117}	—	April 4, 2014	Kitt Peak	Spacewatch	·	1.4 km	MPC · JPL
736080	2015 PF_{119}	—	May 3, 2006	Kitt Peak	Spacewatch	(5)	980 m	MPC · JPL
736081	2015 PM_{119}	—	November 5, 2007	Kitt Peak	Spacewatch	WIT	760 m	MPC · JPL
736082	2015 PZ_{123}	—	April 5, 2014	Haleakala	Pan-STARRS 1	·	1.4 km	MPC · JPL
736083	2015 PB_{126}	—	July 19, 2015	Haleakala	Pan-STARRS 2	·	1.2 km	MPC · JPL
736084	2015 PQ_{126}	—	July 19, 2015	Haleakala	Pan-STARRS 2	·	1.3 km	MPC · JPL
736085	2015 PB_{132}	—	March 13, 2011	Kitt Peak	Spacewatch	·	500 m	MPC · JPL
736086	2015 PG_{135}	—	January 18, 2013	Mount Lemmon	Mount Lemmon Survey	·	1.1 km	MPC · JPL
736087	2015 PJ_{135}	—	February 12, 2008	Kitt Peak	Spacewatch	EMA	2.8 km	MPC · JPL
736088	2015 PG_{136}	—	August 10, 2015	Haleakala	Pan-STARRS 1	·	1.1 km	MPC · JPL
736089	2015 PN_{136}	—	August 10, 2015	Haleakala	Pan-STARRS 1	·	1.0 km	MPC · JPL
736090	2015 PM_{137}	—	July 8, 2010	WISE	WISE	·	2.3 km	MPC · JPL
736091	2015 PB_{138}	—	January 8, 2010	Mount Lemmon	Mount Lemmon Survey	·	980 m	MPC · JPL
736092	2015 PH_{138}	—	August 10, 2015	Haleakala	Pan-STARRS 1	·	1.4 km	MPC · JPL
736093	2015 PO_{140}	—	August 6, 2010	WISE	WISE	·	3.1 km	MPC · JPL
736094	2015 PM_{141}	—	April 25, 2008	Kitt Peak	Spacewatch	·	2.8 km	MPC · JPL
736095	2015 PN_{142}	—	October 23, 2011	Haleakala	Pan-STARRS 1	·	1.4 km	MPC · JPL
736096	2015 PS_{144}	—	January 31, 2009	Kitt Peak	Spacewatch	·	1.5 km	MPC · JPL
736097	2015 PF_{146}	—	January 14, 2008	Kitt Peak	Spacewatch	·	1.9 km	MPC · JPL
736098	2015 PC_{149}	—	November 5, 2007	Kitt Peak	Spacewatch	·	1.2 km	MPC · JPL
736099	2015 PA_{150}	—	December 16, 2006	Kitt Peak	Spacewatch	·	2.8 km	MPC · JPL
736100	2015 PD_{150}	—	April 9, 2014	Haleakala	Pan-STARRS 1	ADE	1.7 km	MPC · JPL

== 736101–736200 ==
back to top

Designation			Discovery			Properties		Ref
Permanent	Provisional	Named after	Date	Site	Discoverer(s)	Category	Diam.	Ref
736101	2015 PO_{151}	—	September 8, 2011	Haleakala	Pan-STARRS 1	·	1.3 km	MPC · JPL
736102	2015 PT_{154}	—	February 11, 2002	Kitt Peak	Spacewatch	·	2.9 km	MPC · JPL
736103	2015 PW_{158}	—	February 27, 2010	WISE	WISE	·	1.8 km	MPC · JPL
736104	2015 PK_{159}	—	March 7, 2003	Palomar	NEAT	·	3.4 km	MPC · JPL
736105	2015 PL_{162}	—	July 24, 2015	Haleakala	Pan-STARRS 1	·	1.6 km	MPC · JPL
736106	2015 PP_{162}	—	November 27, 2012	Mount Lemmon	Mount Lemmon Survey	·	1.4 km	MPC · JPL
736107	2015 PB_{164}	—	February 28, 2009	Mount Lemmon	Mount Lemmon Survey	·	1.7 km	MPC · JPL
736108	2015 PN_{170}	—	January 18, 2009	Mount Lemmon	Mount Lemmon Survey	EUN	940 m	MPC · JPL
736109	2015 PE_{172}	—	July 25, 2015	Haleakala	Pan-STARRS 1	·	1.1 km	MPC · JPL
736110	2015 PV_{172}	—	April 1, 2003	Apache Point	SDSS Collaboration	·	2.0 km	MPC · JPL
736111	2015 PY_{173}	—	August 10, 2015	Haleakala	Pan-STARRS 1	·	1.4 km	MPC · JPL
736112	2015 PP_{175}	—	February 4, 2009	Mount Lemmon	Mount Lemmon Survey	·	1.2 km	MPC · JPL
736113	2015 PY_{177}	—	September 28, 2011	Mount Lemmon	Mount Lemmon Survey	·	1.3 km	MPC · JPL
736114	2015 PK_{178}	—	October 4, 2002	Apache Point	SDSS Collaboration	WIT	920 m	MPC · JPL
736115	2015 PT_{179}	—	September 23, 2011	Haleakala	Pan-STARRS 1	·	1.4 km	MPC · JPL
736116	2015 PA_{180}	—	July 8, 2010	WISE	WISE	·	3.1 km	MPC · JPL
736117	2015 PO_{180}	—	July 24, 2015	Haleakala	Pan-STARRS 1	·	1.3 km	MPC · JPL
736118	2015 PV_{185}	—	April 29, 2014	Haleakala	Pan-STARRS 1	·	1.4 km	MPC · JPL
736119	2015 PT_{186}	—	June 24, 2010	WISE	WISE	·	2.1 km	MPC · JPL
736120	2015 PL_{187}	—	November 19, 2007	Kitt Peak	Spacewatch	·	1.4 km	MPC · JPL
736121	2015 PJ_{190}	—	March 24, 2014	Haleakala	Pan-STARRS 1	·	1.3 km	MPC · JPL
736122	2015 PY_{190}	—	April 23, 2014	Haleakala	Pan-STARRS 1	·	1.4 km	MPC · JPL
736123	2015 PS_{191}	—	October 29, 2011	Kitt Peak	Spacewatch	·	2.1 km	MPC · JPL
736124	2015 PL_{192}	—	April 1, 2003	Apache Point	SDSS Collaboration	EOS	1.7 km	MPC · JPL
736125	2015 PU_{194}	—	May 7, 2014	Haleakala	Pan-STARRS 1	·	1.6 km	MPC · JPL
736126	2015 PL_{197}	—	December 5, 2007	Mount Lemmon	Mount Lemmon Survey	·	2.3 km	MPC · JPL
736127	2015 PN_{206}	—	May 14, 2008	Kitt Peak	Spacewatch	·	3.4 km	MPC · JPL
736128	2015 PY_{209}	—	June 21, 2010	WISE	WISE	·	1.8 km	MPC · JPL
736129	2015 PE_{213}	—	July 20, 2010	WISE	WISE	·	3.5 km	MPC · JPL
736130	2015 PJ_{213}	—	May 7, 2014	Haleakala	Pan-STARRS 1	·	1.2 km	MPC · JPL
736131	2015 PH_{216}	—	April 14, 2008	Kitt Peak	Spacewatch	URS	3.7 km	MPC · JPL
736132	2015 PW_{217}	—	July 24, 2010	WISE	WISE	·	3.9 km	MPC · JPL
736133	2015 PW_{218}	—	May 26, 2010	WISE	WISE	·	2.0 km	MPC · JPL
736134	2015 PX_{219}	—	August 7, 2015	Haleakala	Pan-STARRS 1	EUN	970 m	MPC · JPL
736135	2015 PO_{223}	—	August 10, 2015	Haleakala	Pan-STARRS 1	BRA	1.6 km	MPC · JPL
736136	2015 PY_{224}	—	May 6, 2014	Haleakala	Pan-STARRS 1	·	1.7 km	MPC · JPL
736137	2015 PQ_{225}	—	July 24, 2010	WISE	WISE	·	3.0 km	MPC · JPL
736138	2015 PF_{230}	—	September 27, 2012	Haleakala	Pan-STARRS 1	EUN	1.1 km	MPC · JPL
736139	2015 PG_{230}	—	June 24, 2015	Haleakala	Pan-STARRS 1	ADE	1.9 km	MPC · JPL
736140	2015 PX_{230}	—	December 17, 2007	Kitt Peak	Spacewatch	HOF	2.6 km	MPC · JPL
736141	2015 PW_{231}	—	December 18, 2009	Mount Lemmon	Mount Lemmon Survey	PHO	1.4 km	MPC · JPL
736142	2015 PR_{234}	—	January 29, 2009	Kitt Peak	Spacewatch	·	1.0 km	MPC · JPL
736143	2015 PE_{237}	—	December 20, 2004	Mount Lemmon	Mount Lemmon Survey	EUN	1.0 km	MPC · JPL
736144	2015 PP_{237}	—	July 14, 2015	Haleakala	Pan-STARRS 1	NYS	650 m	MPC · JPL
736145	2015 PZ_{237}	—	December 29, 2008	Kitt Peak	Spacewatch	·	1.2 km	MPC · JPL
736146	2015 PY_{240}	—	June 26, 2015	Haleakala	Pan-STARRS 1	·	1.6 km	MPC · JPL
736147	2015 PT_{243}	—	February 26, 2014	Haleakala	Pan-STARRS 1	DOR	1.7 km	MPC · JPL
736148	2015 PE_{245}	—	November 10, 2005	Mount Lemmon	Mount Lemmon Survey	·	780 m	MPC · JPL
736149	2015 PS_{246}	—	September 24, 2011	Haleakala	Pan-STARRS 1	WIT	700 m	MPC · JPL
736150	2015 PD_{248}	—	March 17, 2004	Apache Point	SDSS Collaboration	3:2	6.1 km	MPC · JPL
736151	2015 PY_{254}	—	February 3, 2009	Kitt Peak	Spacewatch	·	2.4 km	MPC · JPL
736152	2015 PU_{259}	—	July 19, 2015	Haleakala	Pan-STARRS 1	·	1.2 km	MPC · JPL
736153	2015 PR_{268}	—	April 9, 2010	Mount Lemmon	Mount Lemmon Survey	·	1.1 km	MPC · JPL
736154	2015 PO_{274}	—	April 30, 2014	Haleakala	Pan-STARRS 1	·	2.3 km	MPC · JPL
736155	2015 PP_{276}	—	August 26, 2003	Cerro Tololo	Deep Ecliptic Survey	MAR	690 m	MPC · JPL
736156	2015 PT_{276}	—	August 11, 2015	Haleakala	Pan-STARRS 1	·	1.5 km	MPC · JPL
736157	2015 PP_{277}	—	February 28, 2014	Haleakala	Pan-STARRS 1	·	1.3 km	MPC · JPL
736158	2015 PL_{278}	—	July 17, 2010	WISE	WISE	URS	2.4 km	MPC · JPL
736159	2015 PZ_{281}	—	June 27, 2010	WISE	WISE	·	2.2 km	MPC · JPL
736160	2015 PP_{285}	—	October 26, 2011	Haleakala	Pan-STARRS 1	·	1.6 km	MPC · JPL
736161	2015 PH_{286}	—	April 23, 2014	Mount Lemmon	Mount Lemmon Survey	·	1.4 km	MPC · JPL
736162	2015 PJ_{289}	—	July 28, 2005	Palomar	NEAT	·	2.0 km	MPC · JPL
736163	2015 PO_{289}	—	October 20, 2011	Mount Lemmon	Mount Lemmon Survey	·	1.9 km	MPC · JPL
736164	2015 PC_{292}	—	June 18, 2010	WISE	WISE	·	2.6 km	MPC · JPL
736165	2015 PO_{292}	—	July 6, 2010	WISE	WISE	·	2.9 km	MPC · JPL
736166	2015 PF_{293}	—	March 12, 2008	Kitt Peak	Spacewatch	·	3.1 km	MPC · JPL
736167	2015 PC_{297}	—	May 6, 2014	Haleakala	Pan-STARRS 1	·	1.1 km	MPC · JPL
736168	2015 PM_{297}	—	February 10, 2008	Mount Lemmon	Mount Lemmon Survey	·	1.6 km	MPC · JPL
736169	2015 PC_{299}	—	September 26, 2006	Kitt Peak	Spacewatch	·	1.4 km	MPC · JPL
736170	2015 PT_{300}	—	March 8, 2014	Mount Lemmon	Mount Lemmon Survey	·	1.3 km	MPC · JPL
736171	2015 PG_{302}	—	June 5, 2010	WISE	WISE	·	2.4 km	MPC · JPL
736172	2015 PN_{303}	—	September 29, 2011	Kitt Peak	Spacewatch	·	1.6 km	MPC · JPL
736173	2015 PO_{303}	—	October 25, 2011	Haleakala	Pan-STARRS 1	·	1.4 km	MPC · JPL
736174	2015 PJ_{304}	—	October 27, 2011	Mount Lemmon	Mount Lemmon Survey	·	1.4 km	MPC · JPL
736175	2015 PE_{308}	—	October 6, 2008	Mount Lemmon	Mount Lemmon Survey	·	1.5 km	MPC · JPL
736176	2015 PJ_{308}	—	July 29, 2010	WISE	WISE	·	3.2 km	MPC · JPL
736177	2015 PL_{309}	—	June 2, 2015	Cerro Tololo-DECam	DECam	JUN	940 m	MPC · JPL
736178	2015 PW_{311}	—	October 19, 2011	Catalina	CSS	·	1.7 km	MPC · JPL
736179	2015 PN_{314}	—	November 30, 2011	Mount Lemmon	Mount Lemmon Survey	(16286)	1.4 km	MPC · JPL
736180	2015 PB_{315}	—	August 9, 2015	Haleakala	Pan-STARRS 1	·	1.1 km	MPC · JPL
736181	2015 PS_{315}	—	August 9, 2015	Haleakala	Pan-STARRS 1	·	1.8 km	MPC · JPL
736182	2015 PA_{316}	—	October 18, 2011	Mount Lemmon	Mount Lemmon Survey	·	1.2 km	MPC · JPL
736183	2015 PR_{316}	—	March 7, 2013	Mount Lemmon	Mount Lemmon Survey	·	880 m	MPC · JPL
736184	2015 PT_{316}	—	December 17, 2007	Mount Lemmon	Mount Lemmon Survey	NEM	1.8 km	MPC · JPL
736185	2015 PD_{318}	—	August 9, 2015	Haleakala	Pan-STARRS 1	·	2.0 km	MPC · JPL
736186	2015 PF_{320}	—	August 12, 2015	Haleakala	Pan-STARRS 1	·	1.5 km	MPC · JPL
736187	2015 PS_{320}	—	August 28, 2006	Kitt Peak	Spacewatch	EUN	980 m	MPC · JPL
736188	2015 PO_{322}	—	May 7, 2014	Haleakala	Pan-STARRS 1	·	1.4 km	MPC · JPL
736189	2015 PY_{326}	—	June 8, 2010	WISE	WISE	EOS	1.5 km	MPC · JPL
736190	2015 PF_{328}	—	April 12, 2010	WISE	WISE	·	1.6 km	MPC · JPL
736191	2015 PT_{333}	—	August 12, 2015	Haleakala	Pan-STARRS 1	·	2.2 km	MPC · JPL
736192	2015 PY_{339}	—	August 10, 2015	Haleakala	Pan-STARRS 1	·	1.2 km	MPC · JPL
736193	2015 PM_{340}	—	August 14, 2015	Haleakala	Pan-STARRS 1	WIT	820 m	MPC · JPL
736194	2015 PR_{341}	—	August 12, 2015	Haleakala	Pan-STARRS 1	·	1.4 km	MPC · JPL
736195	2015 PL_{343}	—	August 14, 2015	Haleakala	Pan-STARRS 1	·	1.2 km	MPC · JPL
736196	2015 PF_{346}	—	April 2, 2014	Mount Lemmon	Mount Lemmon Survey	AEO	1.0 km	MPC · JPL
736197	2015 PY_{349}	—	August 14, 2015	Haleakala	Pan-STARRS 1	·	1.4 km	MPC · JPL
736198	2015 QZ	—	January 13, 1996	Kitt Peak	Spacewatch	·	3.7 km	MPC · JPL
736199	2015 QU_{3}	—	February 15, 2010	WISE	WISE	·	1.8 km	MPC · JPL
736200	2015 QW_{3}	—	July 12, 2015	Haleakala	Pan-STARRS 1	·	2.6 km	MPC · JPL

== 736201–736300 ==
back to top

Designation			Discovery			Properties		Ref
Permanent	Provisional	Named after	Date	Site	Discoverer(s)	Category	Diam.	Ref
736201	2015 QP_{4}	—	November 4, 2005	Mount Lemmon	Mount Lemmon Survey	·	720 m	MPC · JPL
736202	2015 QU_{6}	—	June 27, 2015	Haleakala	Pan-STARRS 1	NEM	1.8 km	MPC · JPL
736203	2015 QD_{8}	—	December 22, 2008	Mount Lemmon	Mount Lemmon Survey	·	1.2 km	MPC · JPL
736204	2015 QH_{8}	—	September 2, 2011	Haleakala	Pan-STARRS 1	·	1.0 km	MPC · JPL
736205	2015 QT_{12}	—	March 11, 2005	Mount Lemmon	Mount Lemmon Survey	·	1.2 km	MPC · JPL
736206	2015 QU_{12}	—	October 24, 2011	Haleakala	Pan-STARRS 1	WIT	780 m	MPC · JPL
736207	2015 QW_{12}	—	July 16, 2010	WISE	WISE	·	2.2 km	MPC · JPL
736208	2015 QS_{13}	—	July 24, 2010	WISE	WISE	·	2.2 km	MPC · JPL
736209	2015 QX_{14}	—	September 18, 2006	Kitt Peak	Spacewatch	AGN	790 m	MPC · JPL
736210	2015 QQ_{17}	—	July 28, 2011	Haleakala	Pan-STARRS 1	·	920 m	MPC · JPL
736211	2015 QY_{28}	—	August 21, 2015	Haleakala	Pan-STARRS 1	·	1.4 km	MPC · JPL
736212	2015 RO_{5}	—	June 5, 2010	WISE	WISE	ADE	1.5 km	MPC · JPL
736213	2015 RD_{8}	—	July 22, 2010	WISE	WISE	HYG	2.4 km	MPC · JPL
736214	2015 RF_{9}	—	May 14, 2010	WISE	WISE	NAE	2.2 km	MPC · JPL
736215	2015 RN_{9}	—	August 22, 2004	Kitt Peak	Spacewatch	·	3.4 km	MPC · JPL
736216	2015 RQ_{12}	—	September 4, 2011	Haleakala	Pan-STARRS 1	·	1.3 km	MPC · JPL
736217	2015 RX_{14}	—	April 1, 2010	WISE	WISE	·	2.6 km	MPC · JPL
736218	2015 RA_{15}	—	October 15, 2007	Mount Lemmon	Mount Lemmon Survey	·	1.4 km	MPC · JPL
736219	2015 RO_{16}	—	June 25, 2010	WISE	WISE	·	1.3 km	MPC · JPL
736220	2015 RS_{17}	—	January 19, 2008	Mount Lemmon	Mount Lemmon Survey	·	1.7 km	MPC · JPL
736221	2015 RM_{18}	—	August 6, 2005	Palomar	NEAT	·	760 m	MPC · JPL
736222	2015 RV_{19}	—	October 23, 2003	Apache Point	SDSS Collaboration	(194)	1.8 km	MPC · JPL
736223	2015 RQ_{21}	—	September 4, 2007	Mount Lemmon	Mount Lemmon Survey	·	880 m	MPC · JPL
736224	2015 RX_{21}	—	May 3, 2014	Mount Lemmon	Mount Lemmon Survey	·	1.3 km	MPC · JPL
736225	2015 RH_{23}	—	April 9, 2010	Mount Lemmon	Mount Lemmon Survey	·	1.0 km	MPC · JPL
736226	2015 RN_{23}	—	September 29, 2011	Mount Lemmon	Mount Lemmon Survey	·	1.2 km	MPC · JPL
736227	2015 RA_{25}	—	October 21, 2011	Kitt Peak	Spacewatch	·	1.4 km	MPC · JPL
736228	2015 RT_{25}	—	March 28, 2009	Kitt Peak	Spacewatch	·	1.4 km	MPC · JPL
736229	2015 RA_{32}	—	May 14, 2009	Mount Lemmon	Mount Lemmon Survey	·	2.2 km	MPC · JPL
736230	2015 RT_{32}	—	September 27, 2006	Catalina	CSS	·	1.9 km	MPC · JPL
736231	2015 RV_{32}	—	June 6, 2014	Haleakala	Pan-STARRS 1	·	2.0 km	MPC · JPL
736232	2015 RO_{33}	—	January 21, 2010	WISE	WISE	·	2.6 km	MPC · JPL
736233	2015 RU_{34}	—	May 15, 2010	WISE	WISE	PHO	960 m	MPC · JPL
736234	2015 RT_{37}	—	August 10, 2001	Palomar	NEAT	GAL	2.1 km	MPC · JPL
736235	2015 RD_{40}	—	April 10, 2000	Kitt Peak	M. W. Buie	NEM	2.1 km	MPC · JPL
736236	2015 RD_{41}	—	April 30, 2014	Haleakala	Pan-STARRS 1	·	1.3 km	MPC · JPL
736237	2015 RK_{41}	—	March 10, 2014	Kitt Peak	Spacewatch	(6769)	1.1 km	MPC · JPL
736238	2015 RN_{41}	—	March 18, 2007	Kitt Peak	Spacewatch	NYS	830 m	MPC · JPL
736239	2015 RT_{41}	—	February 17, 2007	Mount Lemmon	Mount Lemmon Survey	EOS	1.6 km	MPC · JPL
736240	2015 RE_{42}	—	March 8, 2013	Haleakala	Pan-STARRS 1	·	1.5 km	MPC · JPL
736241	2015 RG_{42}	—	August 25, 2004	Kitt Peak	Spacewatch	·	2.5 km	MPC · JPL
736242	2015 RP_{42}	—	September 29, 2011	Kitt Peak	Spacewatch	MIS	2.0 km	MPC · JPL
736243	2015 RF_{43}	—	August 30, 2005	Campo Imperatore	CINEOS	KOR	1.3 km	MPC · JPL
736244	2015 RQ_{44}	—	February 7, 2013	Kitt Peak	Spacewatch	·	1.2 km	MPC · JPL
736245	2015 RL_{45}	—	October 10, 2002	Apache Point	SDSS Collaboration	·	570 m	MPC · JPL
736246	2015 RR_{47}	—	May 7, 2014	Haleakala	Pan-STARRS 1	·	1.1 km	MPC · JPL
736247	2015 RU_{50}	—	March 5, 2013	Mount Lemmon	Mount Lemmon Survey	·	1.6 km	MPC · JPL
736248	2015 RM_{51}	—	March 5, 2013	Mount Lemmon	Mount Lemmon Survey	·	1.4 km	MPC · JPL
736249	2015 RF_{52}	—	September 17, 2006	Kitt Peak	Spacewatch	·	1.5 km	MPC · JPL
736250	2015 RN_{52}	—	September 27, 2006	Mount Lemmon	Mount Lemmon Survey	·	1.7 km	MPC · JPL
736251	2015 RT_{53}	—	November 24, 2011	Mount Lemmon	Mount Lemmon Survey	·	1.4 km	MPC · JPL
736252	2015 RL_{54}	—	November 13, 2006	Mount Lemmon	Mount Lemmon Survey	·	2.1 km	MPC · JPL
736253	2015 RO_{62}	—	September 10, 2015	Haleakala	Pan-STARRS 1	·	1.3 km	MPC · JPL
736254	2015 RZ_{62}	—	September 22, 2003	Kitt Peak	Spacewatch	·	2.0 km	MPC · JPL
736255	2015 RU_{63}	—	August 5, 2010	WISE	WISE	·	900 m	MPC · JPL
736256	2015 RY_{63}	—	October 21, 2011	Kitt Peak	Spacewatch	·	1.3 km	MPC · JPL
736257	2015 RB_{66}	—	October 3, 2006	Mount Lemmon	Mount Lemmon Survey	·	1.5 km	MPC · JPL
736258	2015 RU_{66}	—	September 8, 2011	Kitt Peak	Spacewatch	·	710 m	MPC · JPL
736259	2015 RJ_{70}	—	March 12, 2013	Kitt Peak	Research and Education Collaborative Occultation Network	AGN	870 m	MPC · JPL
736260	2015 RW_{72}	—	February 9, 2013	Haleakala	Pan-STARRS 1	·	1.3 km	MPC · JPL
736261	2015 RH_{78}	—	October 24, 2011	Haleakala	Pan-STARRS 1	·	1.3 km	MPC · JPL
736262	2015 RJ_{79}	—	February 9, 2008	Kitt Peak	Spacewatch	·	1.4 km	MPC · JPL
736263	2015 RJ_{84}	—	July 25, 2010	WISE	WISE	·	3.8 km	MPC · JPL
736264	2015 RS_{86}	—	August 27, 2006	Kitt Peak	Spacewatch	HNS	1.3 km	MPC · JPL
736265	2015 RM_{88}	—	October 23, 2006	Palomar	NEAT	·	2.4 km	MPC · JPL
736266	2015 RH_{91}	—	November 13, 2005	Palomar	NEAT	URS	6.0 km	MPC · JPL
736267	2015 RQ_{94}	—	March 29, 2010	WISE	WISE	·	3.0 km	MPC · JPL
736268	2015 RG_{98}	—	September 12, 2004	Socorro	LINEAR	·	4.9 km	MPC · JPL
736269	2015 RY_{100}	—	February 12, 2002	Socorro	LINEAR	·	5.8 km	MPC · JPL
736270	2015 RM_{103}	—	November 26, 2012	Mount Lemmon	Mount Lemmon Survey	·	720 m	MPC · JPL
736271	2015 RL_{104}	—	February 18, 2013	Mount Lemmon	Mount Lemmon Survey	·	1.2 km	MPC · JPL
736272	2015 RO_{107}	—	September 30, 2006	Kitt Peak	Spacewatch	·	1.6 km	MPC · JPL
736273	2015 RC_{115}	—	August 21, 2015	Haleakala	Pan-STARRS 1	·	1.4 km	MPC · JPL
736274	2015 RE_{115}	—	July 31, 2011	Haleakala	Pan-STARRS 1	·	900 m	MPC · JPL
736275	2015 RR_{115}	—	October 15, 2001	Palomar	NEAT	DOR	2.2 km	MPC · JPL
736276	2015 RB_{120}	—	September 19, 2006	Catalina	CSS	·	1.9 km	MPC · JPL
736277	2015 RH_{122}	—	May 14, 2010	WISE	WISE	·	2.2 km	MPC · JPL
736278	2015 RJ_{122}	—	April 23, 2009	Mount Lemmon	Mount Lemmon Survey	NAE	3.0 km	MPC · JPL
736279	2015 RO_{122}	—	May 18, 2010	WISE	WISE	·	2.6 km	MPC · JPL
736280	2015 RP_{122}	—	July 1, 2011	Siding Spring	SSS	PHO	1.0 km	MPC · JPL
736281	2015 RX_{122}	—	July 26, 2010	WISE	WISE	·	2.4 km	MPC · JPL
736282	2015 RB_{123}	—	May 28, 2010	WISE	WISE	·	2.1 km	MPC · JPL
736283	2015 RD_{123}	—	April 7, 2010	WISE	WISE	·	2.0 km	MPC · JPL
736284	2015 RS_{126}	—	October 24, 2011	Mount Lemmon	Mount Lemmon Survey	·	1.2 km	MPC · JPL
736285	2015 RZ_{129}	—	September 2, 2010	Mount Lemmon	Mount Lemmon Survey	KOR	1.2 km	MPC · JPL
736286	2015 RS_{132}	—	August 1, 2010	WISE	WISE	·	2.9 km	MPC · JPL
736287	2015 RJ_{133}	—	April 22, 2014	Catalina	CSS	·	1.4 km	MPC · JPL
736288	2015 RR_{136}	—	November 1, 2008	Mount Lemmon	Mount Lemmon Survey	3:2 · SHU	4.3 km	MPC · JPL
736289	2015 RV_{138}	—	July 25, 2015	Haleakala	Pan-STARRS 1	NAE	1.6 km	MPC · JPL
736290	2015 RW_{138}	—	January 17, 2013	Kitt Peak	Spacewatch	·	1.4 km	MPC · JPL
736291	2015 RO_{139}	—	April 4, 2003	Kitt Peak	Spacewatch	·	1.0 km	MPC · JPL
736292	2015 RT_{141}	—	November 5, 2007	Kitt Peak	Spacewatch	·	960 m	MPC · JPL
736293	2015 RW_{142}	—	March 11, 2005	Mount Lemmon	Mount Lemmon Survey	·	1.1 km	MPC · JPL
736294	2015 RW_{152}	—	March 19, 2013	Haleakala	Pan-STARRS 1	·	2.5 km	MPC · JPL
736295	2015 RY_{155}	—	December 19, 2009	Mount Lemmon	Mount Lemmon Survey	·	940 m	MPC · JPL
736296	2015 RJ_{156}	—	September 9, 2015	Haleakala	Pan-STARRS 1	·	1.1 km	MPC · JPL
736297	2015 RE_{160}	—	February 8, 2013	Haleakala	Pan-STARRS 1	(17392)	1.1 km	MPC · JPL
736298	2015 RR_{160}	—	April 5, 2014	Haleakala	Pan-STARRS 1	·	940 m	MPC · JPL
736299	2015 RF_{163}	—	March 17, 2005	Kitt Peak	Spacewatch	·	1.2 km	MPC · JPL
736300	2015 RQ_{165}	—	January 10, 2013	Haleakala	Pan-STARRS 1	·	1.2 km	MPC · JPL

== 736301–736400 ==
back to top

Designation			Discovery			Properties		Ref
Permanent	Provisional	Named after	Date	Site	Discoverer(s)	Category	Diam.	Ref
736301	2015 RT_{165}	—	September 24, 2011	Haleakala	Pan-STARRS 1	ADE	1.4 km	MPC · JPL
736302	2015 RA_{169}	—	November 16, 2011	Mount Lemmon	Mount Lemmon Survey	·	1.4 km	MPC · JPL
736303	2015 RT_{173}	—	September 9, 2015	Haleakala	Pan-STARRS 1	·	1.5 km	MPC · JPL
736304	2015 RH_{175}	—	September 9, 2015	Haleakala	Pan-STARRS 1	·	1.2 km	MPC · JPL
736305	2015 RT_{186}	—	June 27, 2010	WISE	WISE	·	2.7 km	MPC · JPL
736306	2015 RK_{188}	—	November 6, 2012	Kitt Peak	Spacewatch	·	1.5 km	MPC · JPL
736307	2015 RE_{193}	—	September 11, 2015	Haleakala	Pan-STARRS 1	·	2.0 km	MPC · JPL
736308	2015 RT_{193}	—	September 11, 2015	Haleakala	Pan-STARRS 1	·	1.3 km	MPC · JPL
736309	2015 RW_{197}	—	December 18, 2007	Mount Lemmon	Mount Lemmon Survey	·	1.6 km	MPC · JPL
736310	2015 RH_{201}	—	February 15, 2013	ESA OGS	ESA OGS	HNS	1.1 km	MPC · JPL
736311	2015 RB_{204}	—	March 7, 2013	Mount Lemmon	Mount Lemmon Survey	·	1.6 km	MPC · JPL
736312	2015 RT_{204}	—	May 6, 2002	Socorro	LINEAR	·	1.3 km	MPC · JPL
736313	2015 RR_{205}	—	August 12, 2015	Haleakala	Pan-STARRS 1	·	1.5 km	MPC · JPL
736314	2015 RB_{206}	—	September 19, 2006	Catalina	CSS	·	1.5 km	MPC · JPL
736315	2015 RO_{208}	—	February 28, 2008	Mount Lemmon	Mount Lemmon Survey	KOR	1.1 km	MPC · JPL
736316	2015 RV_{208}	—	December 2, 2010	Mount Lemmon	Mount Lemmon Survey	(1298)	2.3 km	MPC · JPL
736317	2015 RF_{209}	—	July 23, 2015	Haleakala	Pan-STARRS 1	·	1.8 km	MPC · JPL
736318	2015 RZ_{211}	—	March 4, 2005	Mount Lemmon	Mount Lemmon Survey	·	890 m	MPC · JPL
736319	2015 RH_{214}	—	August 4, 2010	WISE	WISE	·	2.8 km	MPC · JPL
736320	2015 RX_{218}	—	September 1, 2010	Mount Lemmon	Mount Lemmon Survey	KOR	990 m	MPC · JPL
736321	2015 RT_{225}	—	September 11, 2015	Haleakala	Pan-STARRS 1	·	1.5 km	MPC · JPL
736322	2015 RE_{226}	—	August 12, 2015	Haleakala	Pan-STARRS 1	AGN	1.0 km	MPC · JPL
736323	2015 RJ_{226}	—	September 11, 2015	Haleakala	Pan-STARRS 1	HOF	1.9 km	MPC · JPL
736324	2015 RR_{226}	—	December 9, 2012	Piszkéstető	K. Sárneczky	V	660 m	MPC · JPL
736325	2015 RD_{227}	—	October 2, 2006	Mount Lemmon	Mount Lemmon Survey	·	1.4 km	MPC · JPL
736326	2015 RF_{228}	—	November 7, 2007	Kitt Peak	Spacewatch	·	1.0 km	MPC · JPL
736327	2015 RK_{230}	—	March 18, 2009	Kitt Peak	Spacewatch	·	1.4 km	MPC · JPL
736328	2015 RB_{232}	—	January 19, 2012	Haleakala	Pan-STARRS 1	·	2.2 km	MPC · JPL
736329	2015 RE_{236}	—	September 19, 1998	Apache Point	SDSS Collaboration	·	1.4 km	MPC · JPL
736330	2015 RR_{238}	—	November 12, 2001	Apache Point	SDSS Collaboration	·	1.6 km	MPC · JPL
736331	2015 RW_{239}	—	November 13, 2006	Catalina	CSS	·	1.6 km	MPC · JPL
736332	2015 RM_{240}	—	June 9, 2010	WISE	WISE	·	2.2 km	MPC · JPL
736333	2015 RR_{240}	—	November 24, 2011	Mount Lemmon	Mount Lemmon Survey	·	1.6 km	MPC · JPL
736334	2015 RH_{241}	—	July 3, 2011	Mount Lemmon	Mount Lemmon Survey	PHO	750 m	MPC · JPL
736335	2015 RJ_{242}	—	July 11, 2005	Mount Lemmon	Mount Lemmon Survey	·	2.5 km	MPC · JPL
736336	2015 RW_{242}	—	September 25, 2001	Palomar	NEAT	·	1.9 km	MPC · JPL
736337	2015 RH_{243}	—	November 19, 2007	Kitt Peak	Spacewatch	·	1.9 km	MPC · JPL
736338	2015 RW_{244}	—	October 10, 2001	Palomar	NEAT	TIN	1.6 km	MPC · JPL
736339	2015 RG_{245}	—	August 7, 2010	WISE	WISE	·	2.8 km	MPC · JPL
736340	2015 RN_{249}	—	October 2, 2006	Mount Lemmon	Mount Lemmon Survey	·	1.6 km	MPC · JPL
736341	2015 RT_{252}	—	October 18, 2007	Mount Lemmon	Mount Lemmon Survey	·	950 m	MPC · JPL
736342	2015 RC_{255}	—	October 21, 2006	Mount Lemmon	Mount Lemmon Survey	·	1.3 km	MPC · JPL
736343	2015 RR_{255}	—	February 9, 2008	Mount Lemmon	Mount Lemmon Survey	HOF	2.0 km	MPC · JPL
736344	2015 RY_{255}	—	February 3, 2013	Haleakala	Pan-STARRS 1	·	970 m	MPC · JPL
736345	2015 RM_{258}	—	April 5, 2014	Haleakala	Pan-STARRS 1	·	1.4 km	MPC · JPL
736346	2015 RN_{259}	—	March 19, 2009	Mount Lemmon	Mount Lemmon Survey	·	1.4 km	MPC · JPL
736347	2015 RK_{260}	—	September 9, 2015	Haleakala	Pan-STARRS 1	·	1.3 km	MPC · JPL
736348	2015 RP_{260}	—	October 21, 2006	Kitt Peak	Spacewatch	·	1.6 km	MPC · JPL
736349	2015 RX_{261}	—	September 6, 2015	Catalina	CSS	KON	1.7 km	MPC · JPL
736350	2015 RG_{262}	—	February 15, 2013	Haleakala	Pan-STARRS 1	·	1.5 km	MPC · JPL
736351	2015 RX_{262}	—	October 17, 2010	Mount Lemmon	Mount Lemmon Survey	·	1.7 km	MPC · JPL
736352	2015 RE_{263}	—	January 2, 2012	Mount Lemmon	Mount Lemmon Survey	·	1.5 km	MPC · JPL
736353	2015 RL_{264}	—	January 22, 2013	Mount Lemmon	Mount Lemmon Survey	·	1.2 km	MPC · JPL
736354	2015 RP_{265}	—	September 17, 2009	Kitt Peak	Spacewatch	THM	1.8 km	MPC · JPL
736355	2015 RC_{266}	—	September 9, 2015	Haleakala	Pan-STARRS 1	·	1.3 km	MPC · JPL
736356	2015 RC_{267}	—	September 9, 2015	Haleakala	Pan-STARRS 1	·	1.4 km	MPC · JPL
736357	2015 RK_{268}	—	September 9, 2015	Haleakala	Pan-STARRS 1	MAR	760 m	MPC · JPL
736358	2015 RE_{269}	—	September 15, 2010	Mount Lemmon	Mount Lemmon Survey	·	1.6 km	MPC · JPL
736359	2015 RN_{270}	—	September 25, 2006	Kitt Peak	Spacewatch	·	1.4 km	MPC · JPL
736360	2015 RC_{271}	—	October 19, 2011	Mount Lemmon	Mount Lemmon Survey	·	1.3 km	MPC · JPL
736361	2015 RS_{271}	—	March 5, 2013	Mount Lemmon	Mount Lemmon Survey	ADE	1.7 km	MPC · JPL
736362	2015 RZ_{271}	—	March 26, 2009	Kitt Peak	Spacewatch	·	1.3 km	MPC · JPL
736363	2015 RT_{273}	—	October 20, 2006	Kitt Peak	Spacewatch	HOF	2.1 km	MPC · JPL
736364	2015 RP_{305}	—	September 6, 2015	XuYi	PMO NEO Survey Program	·	2.4 km	MPC · JPL
736365	2015 RY_{320}	—	September 12, 2015	Haleakala	Pan-STARRS 1	AGN	930 m	MPC · JPL
736366	2015 RF_{325}	—	September 12, 2015	Haleakala	Pan-STARRS 1	KOR	1.1 km	MPC · JPL
736367	2015 RO_{325}	—	September 10, 2015	Haleakala	Pan-STARRS 1	(12739)	1.3 km	MPC · JPL
736368	2015 RJ_{327}	—	September 12, 2015	Haleakala	Pan-STARRS 1	EUN	1.1 km	MPC · JPL
736369	2015 RO_{333}	—	September 12, 2015	Haleakala	Pan-STARRS 1	·	1.3 km	MPC · JPL
736370	2015 RX_{333}	—	September 9, 2015	Haleakala	Pan-STARRS 1	(29841)	1.0 km	MPC · JPL
736371	2015 RD_{340}	—	September 11, 2015	Haleakala	Pan-STARRS 1	AGN	870 m	MPC · JPL
736372	2015 RE_{341}	—	September 9, 2015	Haleakala	Pan-STARRS 1	·	1.4 km	MPC · JPL
736373	2015 SF_{4}	—	August 4, 2002	Palomar	NEAT	·	5.1 km	MPC · JPL
736374	2015 SJ_{8}	—	September 14, 2002	Anderson Mesa	LONEOS	·	2.9 km	MPC · JPL
736375	2015 SX_{9}	—	January 8, 2010	WISE	WISE	EUP	3.5 km	MPC · JPL
736376	2015 SE_{19}	—	February 25, 2007	Mount Lemmon	Mount Lemmon Survey	·	1.7 km	MPC · JPL
736377	2015 SV_{19}	—	January 1, 2012	Mount Lemmon	Mount Lemmon Survey	·	1.7 km	MPC · JPL
736378	2015 SN_{24}	—	March 15, 2008	Mount Lemmon	Mount Lemmon Survey	·	4.6 km	MPC · JPL
736379	2015 SR_{24}	—	February 11, 2008	Mount Lemmon	Mount Lemmon Survey	NEM	1.8 km	MPC · JPL
736380	2015 SY_{24}	—	March 24, 2009	Mount Lemmon	Mount Lemmon Survey	·	1.7 km	MPC · JPL
736381	2015 SD_{28}	—	September 23, 2015	Haleakala	Pan-STARRS 1	·	1.7 km	MPC · JPL
736382	2015 SR_{28}	—	September 23, 2015	Haleakala	Pan-STARRS 1	·	1.4 km	MPC · JPL
736383	2015 SZ_{28}	—	September 18, 2010	Mount Lemmon	Mount Lemmon Survey	·	1.6 km	MPC · JPL
736384	2015 SZ_{29}	—	September 23, 2015	Haleakala	Pan-STARRS 1	·	1.2 km	MPC · JPL
736385	2015 SY_{44}	—	September 23, 2015	Haleakala	Pan-STARRS 1	·	1.6 km	MPC · JPL
736386	2015 SQ_{45}	—	September 19, 2015	Mount Lemmon	Mount Lemmon Survey	EUN	930 m	MPC · JPL
736387	2015 SQ_{49}	—	September 23, 2015	Haleakala	Pan-STARRS 1	·	2.9 km	MPC · JPL
736388	2015 TR_{2}	—	October 31, 2006	Kitt Peak	Spacewatch	·	1.6 km	MPC · JPL
736389	2015 TG_{4}	—	March 8, 2003	Kitt Peak	Spacewatch	·	3.9 km	MPC · JPL
736390	2015 TN_{4}	—	September 29, 1973	Palomar	C. J. van Houten, I. van Houten-Groeneveld, T. Gehrels	·	1.2 km	MPC · JPL
736391	2015 TT_{6}	—	February 9, 2008	Mount Lemmon	Mount Lemmon Survey	·	2.3 km	MPC · JPL
736392	2015 TX_{7}	—	June 9, 2010	WISE	WISE	·	1.9 km	MPC · JPL
736393	2015 TD_{8}	—	July 7, 2010	WISE	WISE	·	3.6 km	MPC · JPL
736394	2015 TK_{8}	—	July 22, 2010	WISE	WISE	·	2.9 km	MPC · JPL
736395	2015 TC_{14}	—	January 29, 2007	Kitt Peak	Spacewatch	·	2.7 km	MPC · JPL
736396	2015 TR_{14}	—	October 17, 2011	Kitt Peak	Spacewatch	·	1.6 km	MPC · JPL
736397	2015 TU_{17}	—	November 5, 2007	Mount Lemmon	Mount Lemmon Survey	·	1.2 km	MPC · JPL
736398	2015 TK_{23}	—	October 3, 2010	Kitt Peak	Spacewatch	·	1.6 km	MPC · JPL
736399	2015 TZ_{26}	—	September 9, 2015	XuYi	PMO NEO Survey Program	·	1.6 km	MPC · JPL
736400	2015 TA_{27}	—	September 6, 2015	Haleakala	Pan-STARRS 1	WIT	960 m	MPC · JPL

== 736401–736500 ==
back to top

Designation			Discovery			Properties		Ref
Permanent	Provisional	Named after	Date	Site	Discoverer(s)	Category	Diam.	Ref
736401	2015 TC_{28}	—	February 5, 2013	Kitt Peak	Spacewatch	·	1.4 km	MPC · JPL
736402	2015 TH_{28}	—	July 27, 2010	WISE	WISE	·	3.3 km	MPC · JPL
736403	2015 TP_{29}	—	February 29, 2008	Catalina	CSS	·	2.7 km	MPC · JPL
736404	2015 TJ_{30}	—	July 12, 2010	WISE	WISE	·	2.6 km	MPC · JPL
736405	2015 TN_{31}	—	November 8, 2007	Kitt Peak	Spacewatch	·	1.3 km	MPC · JPL
736406	2015 TZ_{32}	—	July 24, 2015	Haleakala	Pan-STARRS 1	·	1.4 km	MPC · JPL
736407	2015 TN_{34}	—	November 20, 2007	Kitt Peak	Spacewatch	·	1.5 km	MPC · JPL
736408	2015 TG_{35}	—	August 7, 2010	WISE	WISE	·	3.5 km	MPC · JPL
736409	2015 TL_{38}	—	May 23, 2014	Haleakala	Pan-STARRS 1	·	1.6 km	MPC · JPL
736410	2015 TU_{41}	—	August 12, 2015	Haleakala	Pan-STARRS 1	·	1.6 km	MPC · JPL
736411	2015 TM_{42}	—	May 26, 2014	Mount Lemmon	Mount Lemmon Survey	·	1.7 km	MPC · JPL
736412	2015 TE_{45}	—	October 20, 2011	Mount Lemmon	Mount Lemmon Survey	·	1.3 km	MPC · JPL
736413	2015 TP_{46}	—	October 12, 2006	Kitt Peak	Spacewatch	HOF	2.1 km	MPC · JPL
736414	2015 TW_{47}	—	March 3, 2013	Haleakala	Pan-STARRS 1	HNS	880 m	MPC · JPL
736415	2015 TW_{50}	—	September 25, 2006	Kitt Peak	Spacewatch	·	1.7 km	MPC · JPL
736416	2015 TY_{53}	—	October 25, 2011	Haleakala	Pan-STARRS 1	·	1.3 km	MPC · JPL
736417	2015 TE_{57}	—	August 20, 2001	Cerro Tololo	Deep Ecliptic Survey	·	2.0 km	MPC · JPL
736418	2015 TR_{59}	—	January 27, 2007	Mount Lemmon	Mount Lemmon Survey	·	660 m	MPC · JPL
736419	2015 TM_{61}	—	March 28, 2010	WISE	WISE	·	1.9 km	MPC · JPL
736420	2015 TM_{62}	—	September 29, 2010	Mount Lemmon	Mount Lemmon Survey	·	1.5 km	MPC · JPL
736421	2015 TH_{64}	—	March 11, 2005	Kitt Peak	Spacewatch	·	1.7 km	MPC · JPL
736422	2015 TF_{66}	—	October 8, 2015	Haleakala	Pan-STARRS 1	EOS	1.6 km	MPC · JPL
736423	2015 TM_{68}	—	September 16, 2010	Kitt Peak	Spacewatch	·	2.1 km	MPC · JPL
736424	2015 TB_{69}	—	January 14, 2008	Kitt Peak	Spacewatch	·	1.2 km	MPC · JPL
736425	2015 TK_{73}	—	October 17, 2010	Mount Lemmon	Mount Lemmon Survey	KOR	950 m	MPC · JPL
736426	2015 TN_{73}	—	September 9, 2015	Haleakala	Pan-STARRS 1	HOF	2.1 km	MPC · JPL
736427	2015 TT_{73}	—	February 7, 2013	Kitt Peak	Spacewatch	·	1.6 km	MPC · JPL
736428	2015 TA_{76}	—	October 30, 2005	Kitt Peak	Spacewatch	·	1.6 km	MPC · JPL
736429	2015 TV_{77}	—	February 13, 2008	Kitt Peak	Spacewatch	PAD	1.3 km	MPC · JPL
736430	2015 TB_{80}	—	October 2, 2006	Mount Lemmon	Mount Lemmon Survey	·	2.1 km	MPC · JPL
736431	2015 TM_{81}	—	January 23, 2006	Kitt Peak	Spacewatch	HYG	2.2 km	MPC · JPL
736432	2015 TT_{85}	—	April 10, 2013	Haleakala	Pan-STARRS 1	·	1.3 km	MPC · JPL
736433	2015 TE_{86}	—	October 29, 2005	Mount Lemmon	Mount Lemmon Survey	KOR	1.1 km	MPC · JPL
736434	2015 TZ_{86}	—	June 12, 2013	Haleakala	Pan-STARRS 1	EOS	1.8 km	MPC · JPL
736435	2015 TJ_{91}	—	September 19, 2003	Kitt Peak	Spacewatch	·	3.1 km	MPC · JPL
736436	2015 TP_{93}	—	September 9, 2015	Haleakala	Pan-STARRS 1	(21885)	2.3 km	MPC · JPL
736437	2015 TX_{94}	—	June 4, 2014	Haleakala	Pan-STARRS 1	·	1.1 km	MPC · JPL
736438	2015 TZ_{96}	—	February 17, 2010	WISE	WISE	·	4.0 km	MPC · JPL
736439	2015 TM_{99}	—	October 8, 2015	Haleakala	Pan-STARRS 1	DOR	1.9 km	MPC · JPL
736440	2015 TP_{99}	—	September 14, 1998	Socorro	LINEAR	(5)	1.6 km	MPC · JPL
736441	2015 TY_{101}	—	September 30, 2010	Mount Lemmon	Mount Lemmon Survey	HOF	2.1 km	MPC · JPL
736442	2015 TP_{105}	—	May 9, 2010	WISE	WISE	·	1.6 km	MPC · JPL
736443	2015 TR_{105}	—	February 27, 2012	Haleakala	Pan-STARRS 1	EOS	1.5 km	MPC · JPL
736444	2015 TR_{106}	—	October 8, 2015	Haleakala	Pan-STARRS 1	·	2.1 km	MPC · JPL
736445	2015 TG_{110}	—	June 4, 2013	Mount Lemmon	Mount Lemmon Survey	·	1.8 km	MPC · JPL
736446	2015 TE_{111}	—	October 4, 2002	Socorro	LINEAR	·	2.5 km	MPC · JPL
736447	2015 TJ_{112}	—	March 25, 2006	Kitt Peak	Spacewatch	·	3.7 km	MPC · JPL
736448	2015 TL_{115}	—	December 22, 2005	Kitt Peak	Spacewatch	·	2.0 km	MPC · JPL
736449	2015 TM_{117}	—	August 3, 2014	Haleakala	Pan-STARRS 1	·	2.3 km	MPC · JPL
736450	2015 TN_{117}	—	November 21, 2009	Catalina	CSS	·	4.3 km	MPC · JPL
736451	2015 TD_{118}	—	October 8, 2015	Haleakala	Pan-STARRS 1	·	2.4 km	MPC · JPL
736452	2015 TA_{119}	—	October 8, 2015	Haleakala	Pan-STARRS 1	·	1.5 km	MPC · JPL
736453	2015 TE_{120}	—	February 14, 2010	WISE	WISE	PHO	1.1 km	MPC · JPL
736454	2015 TV_{121}	—	November 16, 2006	Catalina	CSS	·	1.6 km	MPC · JPL
736455	2015 TP_{124}	—	June 8, 2011	Mount Lemmon	Mount Lemmon Survey	·	820 m	MPC · JPL
736456	2015 TE_{125}	—	October 8, 2015	Haleakala	Pan-STARRS 1	EOS	1.4 km	MPC · JPL
736457	2015 TF_{125}	—	November 8, 2010	Mount Lemmon	Mount Lemmon Survey	·	1.3 km	MPC · JPL
736458	2015 TH_{127}	—	February 1, 2012	Kitt Peak	Spacewatch	·	3.4 km	MPC · JPL
736459	2015 TO_{127}	—	April 17, 2013	Haleakala	Pan-STARRS 1	·	1.8 km	MPC · JPL
736460	2015 TF_{128}	—	May 23, 2014	Kitt Peak	Spacewatch	·	870 m	MPC · JPL
736461	2015 TH_{132}	—	October 8, 2015	Haleakala	Pan-STARRS 1	·	1.6 km	MPC · JPL
736462	2015 TX_{132}	—	April 10, 2013	Haleakala	Pan-STARRS 1	·	1.4 km	MPC · JPL
736463	2015 TS_{134}	—	January 9, 2006	Kitt Peak	Spacewatch	EOS	1.3 km	MPC · JPL
736464	2015 TY_{134}	—	October 23, 2011	Haleakala	Pan-STARRS 1	EUN	860 m	MPC · JPL
736465	2015 TM_{136}	—	April 18, 2012	Kitt Peak	Spacewatch	·	2.4 km	MPC · JPL
736466	2015 TX_{139}	—	January 8, 2010	WISE	WISE	·	2.5 km	MPC · JPL
736467	2015 TP_{148}	—	October 11, 2010	Mount Lemmon	Mount Lemmon Survey	·	2.3 km	MPC · JPL
736468	2015 TS_{149}	—	November 19, 2006	Kitt Peak	Spacewatch	KOR	1.0 km	MPC · JPL
736469	2015 TT_{151}	—	August 27, 2011	Mayhill-ISON	L. Elenin	NYS	910 m	MPC · JPL
736470	2015 TS_{152}	—	September 24, 2011	Mount Lemmon	Mount Lemmon Survey	·	1.3 km	MPC · JPL
736471	2015 TA_{153}	—	September 18, 2015	Mount Lemmon	Mount Lemmon Survey	AGN	850 m	MPC · JPL
736472	2015 TD_{153}	—	March 13, 2013	Mount Lemmon	Mount Lemmon Survey	·	1.4 km	MPC · JPL
736473	2015 TR_{154}	—	September 17, 2006	Kitt Peak	Spacewatch	·	1.3 km	MPC · JPL
736474	2015 TB_{156}	—	September 1, 2005	Kitt Peak	Spacewatch	·	1.5 km	MPC · JPL
736475	2015 TD_{156}	—	October 19, 2006	Kitt Peak	Spacewatch	HOF	1.9 km	MPC · JPL
736476	2015 TM_{156}	—	March 28, 2009	Mount Lemmon	Mount Lemmon Survey	·	1.4 km	MPC · JPL
736477	2015 TT_{160}	—	March 5, 2013	Haleakala	Pan-STARRS 1	·	1.4 km	MPC · JPL
736478	2015 TA_{161}	—	September 9, 2015	Haleakala	Pan-STARRS 1	·	580 m	MPC · JPL
736479	2015 TV_{161}	—	January 31, 2008	Mount Lemmon	Mount Lemmon Survey	·	2.9 km	MPC · JPL
736480	2015 TK_{162}	—	June 19, 2015	Haleakala	Pan-STARRS 1	·	1.1 km	MPC · JPL
736481	2015 TG_{165}	—	March 24, 2014	Haleakala	Pan-STARRS 1	·	2.6 km	MPC · JPL
736482	2015 TN_{165}	—	June 25, 2010	WISE	WISE	AST	1.6 km	MPC · JPL
736483	2015 TU_{170}	—	July 4, 2014	Haleakala	Pan-STARRS 1	·	1.5 km	MPC · JPL
736484	2015 TE_{171}	—	October 9, 2015	Haleakala	Pan-STARRS 1	·	1.8 km	MPC · JPL
736485	2015 TH_{172}	—	March 14, 2012	Mount Lemmon	Mount Lemmon Survey	·	2.1 km	MPC · JPL
736486	2015 TP_{175}	—	March 8, 2005	Kitt Peak	Spacewatch	EUN	1.0 km	MPC · JPL
736487	2015 TE_{181}	—	December 5, 2008	Mount Lemmon	Mount Lemmon Survey	·	2.2 km	MPC · JPL
736488	2015 TK_{181}	—	July 13, 2010	WISE	WISE	ELF	3.0 km	MPC · JPL
736489	2015 TE_{182}	—	February 21, 2007	Mount Lemmon	Mount Lemmon Survey	·	3.4 km	MPC · JPL
736490	2015 TA_{183}	—	March 11, 2005	Mount Lemmon	Mount Lemmon Survey	·	1.7 km	MPC · JPL
736491	2015 TO_{189}	—	August 9, 2010	WISE	WISE	·	2.6 km	MPC · JPL
736492	2015 TE_{194}	—	November 12, 2005	Kitt Peak	Spacewatch	·	2.6 km	MPC · JPL
736493	2015 TY_{194}	—	January 24, 2007	Mount Lemmon	Mount Lemmon Survey	·	1.6 km	MPC · JPL
736494	2015 TS_{196}	—	July 7, 2010	WISE	WISE	·	2.2 km	MPC · JPL
736495	2015 TP_{197}	—	August 28, 2006	Kitt Peak	Spacewatch	·	1.3 km	MPC · JPL
736496	2015 TY_{201}	—	July 25, 2015	Haleakala	Pan-STARRS 1	·	1.7 km	MPC · JPL
736497	2015 TV_{203}	—	September 13, 2004	Palomar	NEAT	NYS	1.2 km	MPC · JPL
736498	2015 TR_{204}	—	March 21, 1999	Apache Point	SDSS Collaboration	V	660 m	MPC · JPL
736499	2015 TA_{209}	—	August 20, 2006	Palomar	NEAT	·	1.5 km	MPC · JPL
736500	2015 TU_{209}	—	October 27, 2006	Catalina	CSS	·	1.7 km	MPC · JPL

== 736501–736600 ==
back to top

Designation			Discovery			Properties		Ref
Permanent	Provisional	Named after	Date	Site	Discoverer(s)	Category	Diam.	Ref
736501	2015 TO_{211}	—	August 31, 2005	Kitt Peak	Spacewatch	·	710 m	MPC · JPL
736502	2015 TR_{211}	—	September 11, 2015	Haleakala	Pan-STARRS 1	·	1.3 km	MPC · JPL
736503	2015 TK_{214}	—	March 29, 2004	Kitt Peak	Spacewatch	HOF	2.8 km	MPC · JPL
736504	2015 TK_{215}	—	October 23, 2011	Kitt Peak	Spacewatch	·	1.4 km	MPC · JPL
736505	2015 TF_{218}	—	September 10, 2015	Haleakala	Pan-STARRS 1	·	1.3 km	MPC · JPL
736506	2015 TS_{218}	—	September 11, 2015	Haleakala	Pan-STARRS 1	·	1.3 km	MPC · JPL
736507	2015 TW_{218}	—	October 23, 2006	Kitt Peak	Spacewatch	·	1.5 km	MPC · JPL
736508	2015 TF_{219}	—	October 2, 2015	Mount Lemmon	Mount Lemmon Survey	·	2.2 km	MPC · JPL
736509	2015 TN_{220}	—	April 9, 2002	Palomar	NEAT	·	1.9 km	MPC · JPL
736510	2015 TM_{221}	—	September 7, 2004	Kitt Peak	Spacewatch	·	2.1 km	MPC · JPL
736511	2015 TP_{224}	—	October 1, 2006	Kitt Peak	Spacewatch	PAD	1.1 km	MPC · JPL
736512	2015 TV_{224}	—	September 27, 2006	Mount Lemmon	Mount Lemmon Survey	·	1.6 km	MPC · JPL
736513	2015 TL_{230}	—	December 14, 2006	Mount Lemmon	Mount Lemmon Survey	·	2.0 km	MPC · JPL
736514	2015 TM_{233}	—	October 11, 2015	Mount Lemmon	Mount Lemmon Survey	HNS	1.1 km	MPC · JPL
736515	2015 TH_{234}	—	November 17, 1999	Kitt Peak	Spacewatch	·	1.9 km	MPC · JPL
736516	2015 TQ_{239}	—	October 28, 2011	Kitt Peak	Spacewatch	·	1.5 km	MPC · JPL
736517	2015 TZ_{239}	—	January 21, 2009	Mount Lemmon	Mount Lemmon Survey	3:2	5.9 km	MPC · JPL
736518	2015 TY_{247}	—	October 18, 2006	Kitt Peak	Spacewatch	HOF	2.0 km	MPC · JPL
736519	2015 TZ_{247}	—	May 11, 2010	WISE	WISE	·	830 m	MPC · JPL
736520	2015 TX_{251}	—	March 12, 2013	Mount Lemmon	Mount Lemmon Survey	·	2.0 km	MPC · JPL
736521	2015 TH_{253}	—	September 9, 2015	Haleakala	Pan-STARRS 1	·	2.3 km	MPC · JPL
736522	2015 TG_{254}	—	September 17, 2010	Mount Lemmon	Mount Lemmon Survey	AGN	1.0 km	MPC · JPL
736523	2015 TL_{254}	—	October 20, 2006	Kitt Peak	Spacewatch	·	1.6 km	MPC · JPL
736524	2015 TN_{256}	—	February 12, 2000	Apache Point	SDSS Collaboration	·	1.8 km	MPC · JPL
736525	2015 TX_{257}	—	April 21, 2010	WISE	WISE	·	1.7 km	MPC · JPL
736526	2015 TY_{258}	—	November 27, 2011	Kitt Peak	Spacewatch	·	1.7 km	MPC · JPL
736527	2015 TA_{263}	—	July 11, 2010	WISE	WISE	NAE	3.8 km	MPC · JPL
736528	2015 TO_{263}	—	May 13, 2010	WISE	WISE	DOR	1.9 km	MPC · JPL
736529	2015 TG_{271}	—	January 11, 2008	Kitt Peak	Spacewatch	·	1.5 km	MPC · JPL
736530	2015 TZ_{271}	—	September 6, 2015	Haleakala	Pan-STARRS 1	·	1.8 km	MPC · JPL
736531	2015 TY_{276}	—	October 26, 2011	Haleakala	Pan-STARRS 1	·	1.4 km	MPC · JPL
736532	2015 TJ_{278}	—	January 18, 2008	Mount Lemmon	Mount Lemmon Survey	·	1.6 km	MPC · JPL
736533	2015 TP_{280}	—	October 21, 2006	Kitt Peak	Spacewatch	·	1.6 km	MPC · JPL
736534	2015 TU_{280}	—	October 21, 2006	Kitt Peak	Spacewatch	·	1.7 km	MPC · JPL
736535	2015 TE_{285}	—	October 25, 2011	Haleakala	Pan-STARRS 1	·	1.7 km	MPC · JPL
736536	2015 TH_{287}	—	October 27, 2006	Catalina	CSS	·	2.3 km	MPC · JPL
736537	2015 TT_{287}	—	January 15, 2007	Mauna Kea	P. A. Wiegert	·	1.5 km	MPC · JPL
736538	2015 TV_{287}	—	September 12, 2015	Haleakala	Pan-STARRS 1	·	1.6 km	MPC · JPL
736539	2015 TP_{289}	—	August 28, 2006	Kitt Peak	Spacewatch	·	1.5 km	MPC · JPL
736540	2015 TA_{290}	—	September 27, 2006	Mount Lemmon	Mount Lemmon Survey	·	1.5 km	MPC · JPL
736541	2015 TZ_{291}	—	October 24, 2005	Mauna Kea	A. Boattini	·	2.5 km	MPC · JPL
736542	2015 TW_{292}	—	March 5, 2013	Haleakala	Pan-STARRS 1	·	1.5 km	MPC · JPL
736543	2015 TY_{292}	—	May 10, 2014	Haleakala	Pan-STARRS 1	·	1.3 km	MPC · JPL
736544	2015 TK_{293}	—	September 30, 2006	Mount Lemmon	Mount Lemmon Survey	·	1.3 km	MPC · JPL
736545	2015 TL_{293}	—	October 1, 2005	Mount Lemmon	Mount Lemmon Survey	KOR	1.0 km	MPC · JPL
736546	2015 TS_{298}	—	June 21, 2010	WISE	WISE	·	3.0 km	MPC · JPL
736547	2015 TL_{299}	—	November 11, 2006	Mount Lemmon	Mount Lemmon Survey	·	1.4 km	MPC · JPL
736548	2015 TX_{302}	—	January 30, 2012	Mount Lemmon	Mount Lemmon Survey	TIR	2.1 km	MPC · JPL
736549	2015 TW_{304}	—	May 25, 2010	WISE	WISE	·	2.4 km	MPC · JPL
736550	2015 TN_{306}	—	May 10, 2014	Kitt Peak	Spacewatch	·	850 m	MPC · JPL
736551	2015 TZ_{311}	—	May 14, 2010	WISE	WISE	·	2.0 km	MPC · JPL
736552	2015 TT_{313}	—	September 12, 2015	Haleakala	Pan-STARRS 1	·	1.7 km	MPC · JPL
736553	2015 TP_{324}	—	April 5, 2014	Haleakala	Pan-STARRS 1	·	1.2 km	MPC · JPL
736554	2015 TX_{324}	—	March 24, 2009	Mount Lemmon	Mount Lemmon Survey	·	1.8 km	MPC · JPL
736555	2015 TW_{325}	—	October 13, 2015	Haleakala	Pan-STARRS 1	MAR	900 m	MPC · JPL
736556	2015 TH_{328}	—	October 23, 2006	Mount Lemmon	Mount Lemmon Survey	·	2.6 km	MPC · JPL
736557	2015 TP_{328}	—	March 27, 2008	Mount Lemmon	Mount Lemmon Survey	NAE	2.6 km	MPC · JPL
736558	2015 TV_{328}	—	March 11, 2008	Kitt Peak	Spacewatch	·	1.8 km	MPC · JPL
736559	2015 TP_{334}	—	May 23, 2010	WISE	WISE	·	1.7 km	MPC · JPL
736560	2015 TH_{336}	—	August 21, 2001	Kitt Peak	Spacewatch	PAD	1.5 km	MPC · JPL
736561	2015 TY_{337}	—	July 15, 2007	Siding Spring	SSS	·	1.2 km	MPC · JPL
736562	2015 TB_{338}	—	August 12, 2015	Haleakala	Pan-STARRS 1	·	1.1 km	MPC · JPL
736563	2015 TQ_{339}	—	August 13, 2015	Haleakala	Pan-STARRS 1	·	1.2 km	MPC · JPL
736564	2015 TA_{340}	—	October 31, 2005	Catalina	CSS	·	3.6 km	MPC · JPL
736565	2015 TB_{340}	—	September 26, 2003	Apache Point	SDSS Collaboration	·	1.1 km	MPC · JPL
736566	2015 TX_{340}	—	October 1, 2005	Anderson Mesa	LONEOS	·	1.8 km	MPC · JPL
736567	2015 TB_{342}	—	July 18, 2010	WISE	WISE	·	2.3 km	MPC · JPL
736568	2015 TP_{342}	—	December 21, 2006	Kitt Peak	Spacewatch	·	2.0 km	MPC · JPL
736569	2015 TW_{344}	—	September 9, 2015	Haleakala	Pan-STARRS 1	KOR	990 m	MPC · JPL
736570	2015 TS_{349}	—	March 19, 2013	Haleakala	Pan-STARRS 1	·	1.3 km	MPC · JPL
736571	2015 TQ_{358}	—	August 17, 2006	Palomar	NEAT	MIS	2.3 km	MPC · JPL
736572	2015 TX_{358}	—	September 14, 2010	Kitt Peak	Spacewatch	AGN	1.1 km	MPC · JPL
736573	2015 TY_{358}	—	January 26, 2012	Haleakala	Pan-STARRS 1	·	1.4 km	MPC · JPL
736574	2015 TD_{360}	—	June 30, 2014	Haleakala	Pan-STARRS 1	·	1.3 km	MPC · JPL
736575	2015 TM_{360}	—	January 16, 2008	Kitt Peak	Spacewatch	·	1.4 km	MPC · JPL
736576	2015 TL_{365}	—	May 5, 2008	Mount Lemmon	Mount Lemmon Survey	·	1.8 km	MPC · JPL
736577	2015 TU_{366}	—	August 20, 2014	Haleakala	Pan-STARRS 1	·	2.0 km	MPC · JPL
736578	2015 TD_{368}	—	March 8, 2013	Haleakala	Pan-STARRS 1	·	1.2 km	MPC · JPL
736579	2015 TE_{368}	—	May 4, 2009	Mount Lemmon	Mount Lemmon Survey	·	1.8 km	MPC · JPL
736580	2015 TO_{368}	—	October 12, 2009	La Sagra	OAM	·	2.6 km	MPC · JPL
736581	2015 TC_{370}	—	September 26, 2011	Haleakala	Pan-STARRS 1	·	680 m	MPC · JPL
736582	2015 TH_{370}	—	May 28, 2014	Haleakala	Pan-STARRS 1	·	1.3 km	MPC · JPL
736583	2015 TO_{370}	—	October 20, 2006	Kitt Peak	Spacewatch	·	1.3 km	MPC · JPL
736584	2015 TL_{371}	—	October 3, 2015	Mount Lemmon	Mount Lemmon Survey	·	1.2 km	MPC · JPL
736585	2015 TC_{373}	—	March 11, 2003	Kitt Peak	Spacewatch	DOR	1.9 km	MPC · JPL
736586	2015 TT_{374}	—	March 4, 2012	Mount Lemmon	Mount Lemmon Survey	EOS	1.6 km	MPC · JPL
736587	2015 TS_{375}	—	September 15, 2010	Kitt Peak	Spacewatch	·	1.6 km	MPC · JPL
736588	2015 TP_{377}	—	November 23, 2011	Mount Lemmon	Mount Lemmon Survey	·	1.1 km	MPC · JPL
736589	2015 TS_{377}	—	November 17, 2011	Kitt Peak	Spacewatch	EUN	1.1 km	MPC · JPL
736590	2015 TX_{377}	—	October 10, 2015	Haleakala	Pan-STARRS 1	·	1.5 km	MPC · JPL
736591	2015 TJ_{379}	—	September 15, 2009	Mount Lemmon	Mount Lemmon Survey	·	2.2 km	MPC · JPL
736592	2015 TX_{379}	—	October 10, 2015	Haleakala	Pan-STARRS 1	HNS	810 m	MPC · JPL
736593	2015 TP_{380}	—	March 1, 2010	WISE	WISE	PHO	2.3 km	MPC · JPL
736594	2015 TN_{381}	—	January 31, 2012	Kitt Peak	Spacewatch	·	1.7 km	MPC · JPL
736595	2015 TZ_{381}	—	January 30, 2008	Kitt Peak	Spacewatch	·	1.4 km	MPC · JPL
736596	2015 TX_{382}	—	January 19, 2012	Kitt Peak	Spacewatch	KOR	1.1 km	MPC · JPL
736597	2015 TD_{384}	—	November 4, 2001	Cima Ekar	ADAS	·	1.7 km	MPC · JPL
736598	2015 TS_{385}	—	January 14, 2008	Kitt Peak	Spacewatch	·	1.8 km	MPC · JPL
736599	2015 TY_{385}	—	September 29, 2009	Mount Lemmon	Mount Lemmon Survey	·	2.3 km	MPC · JPL
736600	2015 TA_{387}	—	June 7, 2010	WISE	WISE	HOF	2.2 km	MPC · JPL

== 736601–736700 ==
back to top

Designation			Discovery			Properties		Ref
Permanent	Provisional	Named after	Date	Site	Discoverer(s)	Category	Diam.	Ref
736601	2015 TZ_{416}	—	October 8, 2015	Haleakala	Pan-STARRS 1	H	380 m	MPC · JPL
736602	2015 TZ_{422}	—	October 10, 2015	Haleakala	Pan-STARRS 1	·	2.3 km	MPC · JPL
736603	2015 TA_{423}	—	December 1, 2010	Mount Lemmon	Mount Lemmon Survey	·	2.2 km	MPC · JPL
736604	2015 TN_{434}	—	October 2, 2015	Mount Lemmon	Mount Lemmon Survey	·	1.4 km	MPC · JPL
736605	2015 TN_{435}	—	October 13, 2015	Haleakala	Pan-STARRS 1	WIT	680 m	MPC · JPL
736606	2015 TT_{436}	—	October 10, 2015	Haleakala	Pan-STARRS 1	·	1.4 km	MPC · JPL
736607	2015 TO_{445}	—	October 10, 2015	Haleakala	Pan-STARRS 1	·	1.2 km	MPC · JPL
736608	2015 TB_{450}	—	October 10, 2015	Haleakala	Pan-STARRS 1	KOR	1.1 km	MPC · JPL
736609	2015 UE_{6}	—	July 27, 2005	Palomar	NEAT	·	2.0 km	MPC · JPL
736610	2015 UG_{8}	—	October 18, 2015	Haleakala	Pan-STARRS 1	AST	1.4 km	MPC · JPL
736611	2015 UR_{9}	—	January 15, 2007	Mauna Kea	P. A. Wiegert	·	1.5 km	MPC · JPL
736612	2015 UC_{12}	—	August 12, 2015	Haleakala	Pan-STARRS 1	GEF	1.0 km	MPC · JPL
736613	2015 UP_{12}	—	April 10, 2013	Haleakala	Pan-STARRS 1	ADE	1.5 km	MPC · JPL
736614	2015 UZ_{13}	—	September 12, 2015	Haleakala	Pan-STARRS 1	AGN	790 m	MPC · JPL
736615	2015 UO_{18}	—	April 9, 2010	WISE	WISE	·	2.9 km	MPC · JPL
736616	2015 UR_{22}	—	October 18, 2015	Haleakala	Pan-STARRS 1	·	1.4 km	MPC · JPL
736617	2015 UK_{26}	—	August 12, 2015	Haleakala	Pan-STARRS 1	·	1.5 km	MPC · JPL
736618	2015 UV_{26}	—	March 24, 2009	Mount Lemmon	Mount Lemmon Survey	·	1.6 km	MPC · JPL
736619	2015 UC_{27}	—	October 21, 2006	Mount Lemmon	Mount Lemmon Survey	·	1.6 km	MPC · JPL
736620	2015 UH_{29}	—	September 4, 2011	Haleakala	Pan-STARRS 1	·	860 m	MPC · JPL
736621	2015 UM_{29}	—	March 13, 2003	Kitt Peak	Spacewatch	KOR	1.4 km	MPC · JPL
736622	2015 UA_{30}	—	May 7, 2014	Haleakala	Pan-STARRS 1	·	820 m	MPC · JPL
736623	2015 UL_{30}	—	October 29, 2010	Mount Lemmon	Mount Lemmon Survey	·	2.4 km	MPC · JPL
736624	2015 UH_{35}	—	September 9, 2015	Haleakala	Pan-STARRS 1	·	1.4 km	MPC · JPL
736625	2015 UK_{37}	—	September 30, 2005	Kitt Peak	Spacewatch	·	1.5 km	MPC · JPL
736626	2015 UF_{39}	—	October 21, 2006	Mount Lemmon	Mount Lemmon Survey	·	1.9 km	MPC · JPL
736627	2015 UP_{39}	—	October 26, 2011	Haleakala	Pan-STARRS 1	·	1.3 km	MPC · JPL
736628	2015 UZ_{40}	—	April 15, 2005	Kitt Peak	Spacewatch	·	1.6 km	MPC · JPL
736629	2015 UC_{41}	—	October 12, 2015	Haleakala	Pan-STARRS 1	·	1.5 km	MPC · JPL
736630	2015 US_{43}	—	October 8, 2015	Haleakala	Pan-STARRS 1	·	1.9 km	MPC · JPL
736631	2015 UP_{44}	—	November 8, 2010	Mount Lemmon	Mount Lemmon Survey	EOS	1.2 km	MPC · JPL
736632	2015 UD_{46}	—	November 16, 2006	Kitt Peak	Spacewatch	·	1.6 km	MPC · JPL
736633	2015 UR_{47}	—	December 14, 2010	Mount Lemmon	Mount Lemmon Survey	·	2.2 km	MPC · JPL
736634	2015 UY_{49}	—	January 2, 2012	Kitt Peak	Spacewatch	·	2.3 km	MPC · JPL
736635	2015 US_{54}	—	March 16, 2009	Kitt Peak	Spacewatch	·	2.7 km	MPC · JPL
736636	2015 UF_{64}	—	January 7, 2010	WISE	WISE	·	3.8 km	MPC · JPL
736637	2015 UJ_{70}	—	February 9, 2008	Kitt Peak	Spacewatch	·	1.3 km	MPC · JPL
736638	2015 UJ_{71}	—	March 17, 2012	Mount Lemmon	Mount Lemmon Survey	·	2.5 km	MPC · JPL
736639	2015 US_{74}	—	December 19, 2001	Palomar	NEAT	·	3.1 km	MPC · JPL
736640	2015 UU_{74}	—	May 18, 2010	WISE	WISE	·	2.2 km	MPC · JPL
736641	2015 UD_{75}	—	September 16, 2010	Mount Lemmon	Mount Lemmon Survey	·	1.8 km	MPC · JPL
736642	2015 UW_{75}	—	January 19, 2012	Kitt Peak	Spacewatch	·	3.1 km	MPC · JPL
736643	2015 UC_{76}	—	September 26, 2006	Moletai	K. Černis, Zdanavicius, J.	EUN	1.0 km	MPC · JPL
736644	2015 UM_{82}	—	September 18, 2006	Kitt Peak	Spacewatch	·	1.7 km	MPC · JPL
736645	2015 UP_{82}	—	February 6, 2010	WISE	WISE	·	4.0 km	MPC · JPL
736646	2015 UM_{86}	—	August 3, 2014	Haleakala	Pan-STARRS 1	·	2.1 km	MPC · JPL
736647	2015 UK_{88}	—	May 3, 2008	Kitt Peak	Spacewatch	·	1.7 km	MPC · JPL
736648	2015 UE_{90}	—	October 28, 2014	Haleakala	Pan-STARRS 1	·	2.1 km	MPC · JPL
736649	2015 UX_{90}	—	March 3, 2005	Catalina	CSS	·	1.3 km	MPC · JPL
736650	2015 UK_{102}	—	October 16, 2015	Mount Lemmon	Mount Lemmon Survey	·	1.4 km	MPC · JPL
736651	2015 VF	—	September 11, 2001	Kitt Peak	Spacewatch	H	550 m	MPC · JPL
736652	2015 VY_{8}	—	October 10, 2015	Haleakala	Pan-STARRS 1	·	1.5 km	MPC · JPL
736653	2015 VL_{9}	—	March 29, 2008	Kitt Peak	Spacewatch	EOS	1.4 km	MPC · JPL
736654	2015 VK_{10}	—	October 16, 2006	Bergisch Gladbach	W. Bickel	·	1.6 km	MPC · JPL
736655	2015 VO_{10}	—	October 24, 2011	Haleakala	Pan-STARRS 1	·	1.6 km	MPC · JPL
736656	2015 VY_{10}	—	January 18, 2008	Kitt Peak	Spacewatch	·	1.3 km	MPC · JPL
736657	2015 VL_{16}	—	October 12, 2006	Kitt Peak	Spacewatch	·	1.4 km	MPC · JPL
736658	2015 VG_{19}	—	April 23, 2010	WISE	WISE	·	1.3 km	MPC · JPL
736659	2015 VQ_{19}	—	November 20, 2008	Kitt Peak	Spacewatch	·	1.2 km	MPC · JPL
736660	2015 VR_{22}	—	July 24, 2010	WISE	WISE	·	790 m	MPC · JPL
736661	2015 VW_{29}	—	October 27, 2006	Catalina	CSS	·	1.7 km	MPC · JPL
736662	2015 VK_{30}	—	November 1, 2015	Haleakala	Pan-STARRS 1	·	1.4 km	MPC · JPL
736663	2015 VH_{33}	—	September 12, 2001	Kitt Peak	Deep Ecliptic Survey	·	1.6 km	MPC · JPL
736664	2015 VW_{34}	—	September 26, 2006	Kitt Peak	Spacewatch	·	1.2 km	MPC · JPL
736665	2015 VH_{35}	—	October 2, 2006	Mount Lemmon	Mount Lemmon Survey	·	2.0 km	MPC · JPL
736666	2015 VY_{35}	—	April 3, 2008	Mount Lemmon	Mount Lemmon Survey	AGN	1.1 km	MPC · JPL
736667	2015 VG_{37}	—	October 16, 2009	Mount Lemmon	Mount Lemmon Survey	EOS	4.0 km	MPC · JPL
736668	2015 VL_{37}	—	December 9, 2006	Kitt Peak	Spacewatch	·	1.6 km	MPC · JPL
736669	2015 VW_{38}	—	March 13, 2013	Kitt Peak	Spacewatch	HOF	2.4 km	MPC · JPL
736670	2015 VP_{40}	—	September 23, 2011	Haleakala	Pan-STARRS 1	·	1 km	MPC · JPL
736671	2015 VB_{43}	—	February 8, 2013	Haleakala	Pan-STARRS 1	·	1.7 km	MPC · JPL
736672	2015 VK_{47}	—	February 27, 2008	Mount Lemmon	Mount Lemmon Survey	·	2.4 km	MPC · JPL
736673	2015 VN_{47}	—	November 19, 2007	Kitt Peak	Spacewatch	(17392)	1.2 km	MPC · JPL
736674	2015 VV_{50}	—	May 28, 2010	WISE	WISE	·	2.0 km	MPC · JPL
736675	2015 VR_{52}	—	May 4, 2014	Haleakala	Pan-STARRS 1	·	1.7 km	MPC · JPL
736676	2015 VR_{56}	—	October 10, 2015	Haleakala	Pan-STARRS 1	·	1.7 km	MPC · JPL
736677	2015 VD_{57}	—	November 15, 2006	Kitt Peak	Spacewatch	AGN	920 m	MPC · JPL
736678	2015 VU_{58}	—	October 22, 2006	Kitt Peak	Spacewatch	AGN	910 m	MPC · JPL
736679	2015 VQ_{59}	—	August 21, 2015	Haleakala	Pan-STARRS 1	·	1.6 km	MPC · JPL
736680	2015 VE_{63}	—	January 10, 2013	Haleakala	Pan-STARRS 1	·	690 m	MPC · JPL
736681	2015 VD_{68}	—	November 10, 2001	Socorro	LINEAR	DOR	1.9 km	MPC · JPL
736682	2015 VK_{73}	—	March 6, 2013	Haleakala	Pan-STARRS 1	EUP	2.8 km	MPC · JPL
736683	2015 VV_{74}	—	July 25, 2015	Haleakala	Pan-STARRS 1	·	2.7 km	MPC · JPL
736684	2015 VN_{75}	—	February 26, 2008	Mount Lemmon	Mount Lemmon Survey	·	1.8 km	MPC · JPL
736685	2015 VG_{78}	—	October 8, 2015	Haleakala	Pan-STARRS 1	·	1.9 km	MPC · JPL
736686	2015 VT_{78}	—	August 6, 2010	WISE	WISE	·	1.6 km	MPC · JPL
736687	2015 VZ_{78}	—	January 13, 2010	Mount Lemmon	Mount Lemmon Survey	·	1.5 km	MPC · JPL
736688	2015 VA_{81}	—	February 9, 2008	Mount Lemmon	Mount Lemmon Survey	HOF	2.4 km	MPC · JPL
736689	2015 VC_{82}	—	March 15, 2012	Catalina	CSS	·	2.2 km	MPC · JPL
736690	2015 VG_{82}	—	November 30, 2008	Mount Lemmon	Mount Lemmon Survey	PHO	850 m	MPC · JPL
736691	2015 VO_{84}	—	January 19, 2012	Haleakala	Pan-STARRS 1	·	1.6 km	MPC · JPL
736692	2015 VS_{84}	—	April 25, 2007	Kitt Peak	Spacewatch	·	810 m	MPC · JPL
736693	2015 VT_{85}	—	November 18, 2003	Kitt Peak	Spacewatch	·	1.0 km	MPC · JPL
736694	2015 VK_{87}	—	October 7, 2011	Westfield	International Astronomical Search Collaboration	·	980 m	MPC · JPL
736695	2015 VP_{87}	—	January 4, 2012	Mount Lemmon	Mount Lemmon Survey	HOF	2.2 km	MPC · JPL
736696	2015 VQ_{91}	—	June 10, 2005	Kitt Peak	Spacewatch	·	1.2 km	MPC · JPL
736697	2015 VQ_{92}	—	January 22, 2013	Mount Lemmon	Mount Lemmon Survey	·	670 m	MPC · JPL
736698	2015 VA_{94}	—	May 20, 2005	Mount Lemmon	Mount Lemmon Survey	·	2.3 km	MPC · JPL
736699	2015 VN_{94}	—	July 8, 2014	Haleakala	Pan-STARRS 1	VER	2.7 km	MPC · JPL
736700	2015 VK_{95}	—	September 18, 2006	Kitt Peak	Spacewatch	·	1.3 km	MPC · JPL

== 736701–736800 ==
back to top

Designation			Discovery			Properties		Ref
Permanent	Provisional	Named after	Date	Site	Discoverer(s)	Category	Diam.	Ref
736701	2015 VY_{99}	—	September 30, 2006	Mount Lemmon	Mount Lemmon Survey	GEF	870 m	MPC · JPL
736702	2015 VL_{104}	—	January 23, 2006	Kitt Peak	Spacewatch	·	2.2 km	MPC · JPL
736703	2015 VJ_{106}	—	June 3, 2010	WISE	WISE	·	2.2 km	MPC · JPL
736704	2015 VM_{106}	—	August 21, 2015	Haleakala	Pan-STARRS 1	·	1.6 km	MPC · JPL
736705	2015 VX_{109}	—	September 9, 2015	Haleakala	Pan-STARRS 1	·	540 m	MPC · JPL
736706	2015 VC_{111}	—	April 23, 2010	WISE	WISE	·	1.7 km	MPC · JPL
736707	2015 VD_{113}	—	December 14, 2007	Mount Lemmon	Mount Lemmon Survey	(5)	1.7 km	MPC · JPL
736708	2015 VW_{115}	—	March 19, 2013	Haleakala	Pan-STARRS 1	·	1.7 km	MPC · JPL
736709	2015 VO_{116}	—	November 13, 2006	Catalina	CSS	·	830 m	MPC · JPL
736710	2015 VP_{121}	—	December 8, 2004	Socorro	LINEAR	·	3.3 km	MPC · JPL
736711	2015 VS_{122}	—	October 2, 2009	Mount Lemmon	Mount Lemmon Survey	·	3.3 km	MPC · JPL
736712	2015 VU_{123}	—	April 18, 2009	Mount Lemmon	Mount Lemmon Survey	·	1.7 km	MPC · JPL
736713	2015 VC_{125}	—	July 16, 2010	WISE	WISE	NAE	2.6 km	MPC · JPL
736714	2015 VO_{125}	—	December 16, 2006	Kitt Peak	Spacewatch	·	3.1 km	MPC · JPL
736715	2015 VT_{138}	—	June 20, 2007	Kitt Peak	Spacewatch	·	860 m	MPC · JPL
736716	2015 VH_{141}	—	September 12, 2010	ESA OGS	ESA OGS	MRX	930 m	MPC · JPL
736717	2015 VF_{142}	—	October 4, 2006	Mount Lemmon	Mount Lemmon Survey	·	2.0 km	MPC · JPL
736718	2015 VQ_{148}	—	October 21, 2015	Haleakala	Pan-STARRS 1	·	1.2 km	MPC · JPL
736719	2015 VN_{149}	—	June 7, 2010	WISE	WISE	DOR	2.4 km	MPC · JPL
736720	2015 VH_{150}	—	October 9, 2015	Haleakala	Pan-STARRS 1	EUP	2.8 km	MPC · JPL
736721	2015 VY_{151}	—	November 13, 2015	Calar Alto-CASADO	Hellmich, S., Mottola, S.	·	1.9 km	MPC · JPL
736722	2015 VD_{154}	—	September 17, 2010	Mount Lemmon	Mount Lemmon Survey	·	1.4 km	MPC · JPL
736723	2015 VR_{156}	—	December 28, 2007	Kitt Peak	Spacewatch	MAR	1.1 km	MPC · JPL
736724	2015 VW_{156}	—	March 6, 2008	Mount Lemmon	Mount Lemmon Survey	HOF	2.3 km	MPC · JPL
736725	2015 VX_{156}	—	April 21, 2010	WISE	WISE	·	2.3 km	MPC · JPL
736726	2015 VQ_{158}	—	November 1, 2015	Haleakala	Pan-STARRS 1	·	1.7 km	MPC · JPL
736727	2015 VS_{161}	—	November 16, 2006	Kitt Peak	Spacewatch	·	1.7 km	MPC · JPL
736728	2015 VT_{162}	—	November 10, 2015	Mount Lemmon	Mount Lemmon Survey	·	2.5 km	MPC · JPL
736729	2015 VC_{163}	—	November 7, 2015	Mount Lemmon	Mount Lemmon Survey	BRA	1.2 km	MPC · JPL
736730	2015 VD_{163}	—	November 13, 2015	Mount Lemmon	Mount Lemmon Survey	·	1.6 km	MPC · JPL
736731	2015 VG_{164}	—	May 15, 2002	Socorro	LINEAR	·	2.6 km	MPC · JPL
736732	2015 VO_{186}	—	November 14, 2015	Mount Lemmon	Mount Lemmon Survey	·	1.3 km	MPC · JPL
736733	2015 VK_{196}	—	November 3, 2015	Haleakala	Pan-STARRS 1	·	2.3 km	MPC · JPL
736734	2015 VO_{197}	—	November 14, 2015	Mount Lemmon	Mount Lemmon Survey	·	510 m	MPC · JPL
736735	2015 WL	—	November 12, 2001	Apache Point	SDSS	·	1.4 km	MPC · JPL
736736	2015 WT_{2}	—	March 28, 2010	WISE	WISE	PHO	1.1 km	MPC · JPL
736737	2015 WM_{8}	—	January 26, 2010	WISE	WISE	·	2.9 km	MPC · JPL
736738	2015 WQ_{8}	—	September 17, 2010	Mount Lemmon	Mount Lemmon Survey	·	1.7 km	MPC · JPL
736739	2015 WJ_{14}	—	October 9, 1993	La Silla	E. W. Elst	·	2.6 km	MPC · JPL
736740	2015 WX_{14}	—	December 25, 2003	Apache Point	SDSS Collaboration	·	4.6 km	MPC · JPL
736741	2015 WJ_{17}	—	May 6, 2002	Palomar	NEAT	·	2.4 km	MPC · JPL
736742	2015 WZ_{17}	—	November 22, 2015	Mount Lemmon	Mount Lemmon Survey	KOR	1.1 km	MPC · JPL
736743	2015 WH_{18}	—	December 2, 2010	Kitt Peak	Spacewatch	·	1.4 km	MPC · JPL
736744	2015 WM_{19}	—	October 17, 2003	Kitt Peak	Spacewatch	LUT	3.8 km	MPC · JPL
736745	2015 WO_{20}	—	November 19, 2015	Kitt Peak	Spacewatch	·	970 m	MPC · JPL
736746	2015 WU_{29}	—	November 22, 2015	Mount Lemmon	Mount Lemmon Survey	·	2.7 km	MPC · JPL
736747	2015 XN_{2}	—	October 23, 2001	Palomar	NEAT	·	2.0 km	MPC · JPL
736748	2015 XZ_{2}	—	April 16, 2013	Haleakala	Pan-STARRS 1	EOS	1.7 km	MPC · JPL
736749	2015 XA_{5}	—	October 2, 2006	Mount Lemmon	Mount Lemmon Survey	·	1.6 km	MPC · JPL
736750	2015 XH_{9}	—	September 19, 2015	Haleakala	Pan-STARRS 1	EOS	1.4 km	MPC · JPL
736751	2015 XP_{12}	—	April 30, 2014	Haleakala	Pan-STARRS 1	GAL	1.5 km	MPC · JPL
736752	2015 XZ_{13}	—	October 19, 2011	Mount Lemmon	Mount Lemmon Survey	·	910 m	MPC · JPL
736753	2015 XR_{14}	—	November 26, 2005	Kitt Peak	Spacewatch	·	1.4 km	MPC · JPL
736754	2015 XD_{15}	—	July 27, 2014	Haleakala	Pan-STARRS 1	·	1.4 km	MPC · JPL
736755	2015 XH_{21}	—	November 7, 2015	Haleakala	Pan-STARRS 1	·	1.5 km	MPC · JPL
736756	2015 XM_{25}	—	December 2, 2015	Haleakala	Pan-STARRS 1	·	1.3 km	MPC · JPL
736757	2015 XR_{25}	—	September 30, 2010	Mount Lemmon	Mount Lemmon Survey	AGN	900 m	MPC · JPL
736758	2015 XY_{27}	—	February 13, 2012	Kitt Peak	Spacewatch	·	2.4 km	MPC · JPL
736759	2015 XP_{29}	—	July 28, 2014	Haleakala	Pan-STARRS 1	·	1.4 km	MPC · JPL
736760	2015 XX_{29}	—	March 8, 2008	Kitt Peak	Spacewatch	AGN	1.1 km	MPC · JPL
736761	2015 XD_{30}	—	December 2, 2015	Haleakala	Pan-STARRS 1	·	1.3 km	MPC · JPL
736762	2015 XZ_{31}	—	September 30, 2010	Mount Lemmon	Mount Lemmon Survey	·	1.3 km	MPC · JPL
736763	2015 XV_{40}	—	January 14, 2010	WISE	WISE	·	3.0 km	MPC · JPL
736764	2015 XG_{41}	—	September 17, 2010	Mount Lemmon	Mount Lemmon Survey	HOF	2.1 km	MPC · JPL
736765	2015 XN_{42}	—	September 4, 2011	Haleakala	Pan-STARRS 1	·	940 m	MPC · JPL
736766	2015 XW_{46}	—	November 7, 2015	Haleakala	Pan-STARRS 1	·	1.4 km	MPC · JPL
736767	2015 XO_{49}	—	March 13, 2013	Kitt Peak	Spacewatch	·	1.5 km	MPC · JPL
736768	2015 XM_{52}	—	January 10, 2008	Mount Lemmon	Mount Lemmon Survey	·	1.7 km	MPC · JPL
736769	2015 XW_{52}	—	April 28, 2003	Kitt Peak	Spacewatch	·	2.1 km	MPC · JPL
736770	2015 XR_{53}	—	February 1, 2010	WISE	WISE	·	3.0 km	MPC · JPL
736771	2015 XY_{53}	—	January 12, 2010	WISE	WISE	LIX	2.9 km	MPC · JPL
736772	2015 XH_{54}	—	October 11, 2005	Kitt Peak	Spacewatch	·	2.0 km	MPC · JPL
736773	2015 XG_{59}	—	December 5, 2005	Kitt Peak	Spacewatch	·	1.4 km	MPC · JPL
736774	2015 XR_{63}	—	February 1, 2010	WISE	WISE	·	2.7 km	MPC · JPL
736775	2015 XL_{65}	—	November 18, 2015	Haleakala	Pan-STARRS 1	·	1.8 km	MPC · JPL
736776	2015 XK_{66}	—	July 16, 2010	WISE	WISE	·	2.3 km	MPC · JPL
736777	2015 XQ_{70}	—	October 10, 2002	Apache Point	SDSS Collaboration	·	1.8 km	MPC · JPL
736778	2015 XW_{70}	—	September 30, 2009	Mount Lemmon	Mount Lemmon Survey	·	2.8 km	MPC · JPL
736779	2015 XX_{72}	—	January 25, 2012	Haleakala	Pan-STARRS 1	·	2.0 km	MPC · JPL
736780	2015 XD_{75}	—	November 11, 2009	Kitt Peak	Spacewatch	·	3.2 km	MPC · JPL
736781	2015 XZ_{75}	—	November 10, 2010	Kitt Peak	Spacewatch	KOR	1.0 km	MPC · JPL
736782	2015 XU_{76}	—	October 27, 2009	Mount Lemmon	Mount Lemmon Survey	·	2.4 km	MPC · JPL
736783	2015 XN_{80}	—	October 9, 2015	Haleakala	Pan-STARRS 1	HNS	870 m	MPC · JPL
736784	2015 XB_{81}	—	November 19, 2009	Mount Lemmon	Mount Lemmon Survey	·	3.0 km	MPC · JPL
736785	2015 XO_{81}	—	September 19, 2003	Kitt Peak	Spacewatch	·	3.6 km	MPC · JPL
736786	2015 XF_{87}	—	February 6, 2005	Palomar	NEAT	VER	3.9 km	MPC · JPL
736787	2015 XM_{88}	—	January 12, 2010	WISE	WISE	·	2.8 km	MPC · JPL
736788	2015 XP_{90}	—	October 10, 2008	Mount Lemmon	Mount Lemmon Survey	·	3.5 km	MPC · JPL
736789	2015 XB_{92}	—	March 16, 2012	Mount Lemmon	Mount Lemmon Survey	·	1.4 km	MPC · JPL
736790	2015 XF_{94}	—	August 3, 2014	Haleakala	Pan-STARRS 1	·	1.6 km	MPC · JPL
736791	2015 XJ_{95}	—	November 13, 2015	Mount Lemmon	Mount Lemmon Survey	·	1.1 km	MPC · JPL
736792	2015 XS_{98}	—	April 5, 2008	Kitt Peak	Spacewatch	AGN	970 m	MPC · JPL
736793	2015 XE_{99}	—	October 1, 2000	Apache Point	SDSS Collaboration	·	1.4 km	MPC · JPL
736794	2015 XQ_{100}	—	September 25, 2011	Haleakala	Pan-STARRS 1	·	870 m	MPC · JPL
736795	2015 XR_{100}	—	December 4, 2015	Haleakala	Pan-STARRS 1	·	1.5 km	MPC · JPL
736796	2015 XY_{101}	—	November 12, 2001	Apache Point	SDSS Collaboration	GEF	1.4 km	MPC · JPL
736797	2015 XR_{102}	—	October 5, 2002	Apache Point	SDSS Collaboration	·	2.9 km	MPC · JPL
736798	2015 XX_{103}	—	March 31, 2008	Kitt Peak	Spacewatch	·	1.5 km	MPC · JPL
736799	2015 XV_{106}	—	June 18, 2013	Haleakala	Pan-STARRS 1	·	2.2 km	MPC · JPL
736800	2015 XA_{107}	—	May 22, 2001	Anderson Mesa	LONEOS	·	1.5 km	MPC · JPL

== 736801–736900 ==
back to top

Designation			Discovery			Properties		Ref
Permanent	Provisional	Named after	Date	Site	Discoverer(s)	Category	Diam.	Ref
736801	2015 XV_{108}	—	January 15, 2010	WISE	WISE	·	3.5 km	MPC · JPL
736802	2015 XA_{115}	—	July 28, 2014	Haleakala	Pan-STARRS 1	·	1.7 km	MPC · JPL
736803	2015 XJ_{115}	—	December 2, 2010	Mount Lemmon	Mount Lemmon Survey	EOS	1.2 km	MPC · JPL
736804	2015 XS_{118}	—	August 23, 2014	Haleakala	Pan-STARRS 1	·	1.9 km	MPC · JPL
736805	2015 XR_{122}	—	June 14, 2010	WISE	WISE	EUN	1 km	MPC · JPL
736806	2015 XA_{124}	—	December 8, 2002	Palomar	NEAT	JUN	1.1 km	MPC · JPL
736807	2015 XS_{131}	—	October 18, 2001	Palomar	NEAT	·	1.9 km	MPC · JPL
736808	2015 XD_{132}	—	September 30, 2005	Mauna Kea	A. Boattini	·	1.8 km	MPC · JPL
736809	2015 XT_{134}	—	April 13, 2013	Haleakala	Pan-STARRS 1	AGN	1.1 km	MPC · JPL
736810	2015 XG_{137}	—	September 28, 2009	Kitt Peak	Spacewatch	THM	1.8 km	MPC · JPL
736811	2015 XR_{140}	—	January 25, 2011	Mount Lemmon	Mount Lemmon Survey	·	2.2 km	MPC · JPL
736812	2015 XP_{141}	—	November 1, 2005	Mount Lemmon	Mount Lemmon Survey	·	1.6 km	MPC · JPL
736813	2015 XM_{144}	—	November 18, 2001	Kitt Peak	Spacewatch	·	1.7 km	MPC · JPL
736814	2015 XV_{149}	—	February 25, 2010	WISE	WISE	·	3.3 km	MPC · JPL
736815	2015 XZ_{150}	—	October 11, 2009	Mount Lemmon	Mount Lemmon Survey	·	2.5 km	MPC · JPL
736816	2015 XM_{153}	—	November 10, 2009	Mount Lemmon	Mount Lemmon Survey	·	2.6 km	MPC · JPL
736817	2015 XU_{156}	—	July 25, 2014	Haleakala	Pan-STARRS 1	·	1.8 km	MPC · JPL
736818	2015 XV_{157}	—	February 20, 2006	Kitt Peak	Spacewatch	·	2.3 km	MPC · JPL
736819	2015 XY_{162}	—	March 16, 2005	Catalina	CSS	EUN	1.3 km	MPC · JPL
736820	2015 XS_{163}	—	February 17, 2013	Kitt Peak	Spacewatch	·	1.6 km	MPC · JPL
736821	2015 XL_{165}	—	February 23, 2007	Kitt Peak	Spacewatch	·	1.8 km	MPC · JPL
736822	2015 XO_{165}	—	June 18, 2010	WISE	WISE	·	1.8 km	MPC · JPL
736823	2015 XY_{167}	—	March 5, 2010	WISE	WISE	·	3.9 km	MPC · JPL
736824	2015 XO_{171}	—	October 20, 2003	Palomar	NEAT	·	3.4 km	MPC · JPL
736825	2015 XM_{173}	—	April 27, 2012	Haleakala	Pan-STARRS 1	·	2.4 km	MPC · JPL
736826	2015 XC_{174}	—	November 4, 2004	Kitt Peak	Spacewatch	NYS	890 m	MPC · JPL
736827	2015 XS_{176}	—	April 21, 2010	WISE	WISE	KON	2.3 km	MPC · JPL
736828	2015 XL_{178}	—	January 25, 2003	La Silla	A. Boattini, Hainaut, O.	·	1.5 km	MPC · JPL
736829	2015 XD_{179}	—	December 5, 2015	Haleakala	Pan-STARRS 1	·	1.3 km	MPC · JPL
736830	2015 XP_{180}	—	September 15, 2010	Mount Lemmon	Mount Lemmon Survey	·	1.4 km	MPC · JPL
736831	2015 XX_{181}	—	December 5, 2015	Haleakala	Pan-STARRS 1	EOS	1.2 km	MPC · JPL
736832	2015 XZ_{181}	—	September 26, 2003	Apache Point	SDSS Collaboration	·	1.6 km	MPC · JPL
736833	2015 XX_{182}	—	June 28, 2010	WISE	WISE	·	1.9 km	MPC · JPL
736834	2015 XA_{189}	—	October 22, 2003	Apache Point	SDSS Collaboration	·	1.2 km	MPC · JPL
736835	2015 XC_{189}	—	November 10, 2005	Catalina	CSS	·	1.6 km	MPC · JPL
736836	2015 XK_{191}	—	July 30, 2014	Oukaïmeden	C. Rinner	·	1.7 km	MPC · JPL
736837	2015 XZ_{191}	—	December 6, 2015	Mount Lemmon	Mount Lemmon Survey	AGN	1.0 km	MPC · JPL
736838	2015 XC_{192}	—	May 10, 2010	WISE	WISE	·	2.5 km	MPC · JPL
736839	2015 XV_{194}	—	October 30, 2010	Kitt Peak	Spacewatch	·	1.5 km	MPC · JPL
736840	2015 XA_{198}	—	July 28, 2010	WISE	WISE	·	2.4 km	MPC · JPL
736841	2015 XV_{202}	—	June 18, 2013	Haleakala	Pan-STARRS 1	·	2.4 km	MPC · JPL
736842	2015 XS_{205}	—	September 10, 2010	Kitt Peak	Spacewatch	·	1.4 km	MPC · JPL
736843	2015 XX_{205}	—	December 6, 2015	Haleakala	Pan-STARRS 1	·	1.1 km	MPC · JPL
736844	2015 XC_{213}	—	October 12, 2006	Kitt Peak	Spacewatch	·	1.9 km	MPC · JPL
736845	2015 XZ_{215}	—	November 22, 2015	Mount Lemmon	Mount Lemmon Survey	EMA	2.4 km	MPC · JPL
736846	2015 XL_{216}	—	February 8, 2010	WISE	WISE	·	860 m	MPC · JPL
736847	2015 XB_{218}	—	November 17, 2001	Kitt Peak	Spacewatch	·	1.4 km	MPC · JPL
736848	2015 XC_{219}	—	February 27, 2012	Haleakala	Pan-STARRS 1	·	2.4 km	MPC · JPL
736849	2015 XR_{219}	—	April 8, 2010	Kitt Peak	Spacewatch	·	1.0 km	MPC · JPL
736850	2015 XS_{219}	—	July 7, 2014	Haleakala	Pan-STARRS 1	MRX	870 m	MPC · JPL
736851	2015 XL_{221}	—	March 14, 2013	Kitt Peak	Spacewatch	·	1.3 km	MPC · JPL
736852	2015 XG_{222}	—	December 6, 2015	Mount Lemmon	Mount Lemmon Survey	·	1.1 km	MPC · JPL
736853	2015 XT_{224}	—	April 29, 2009	Kitt Peak	Spacewatch	MAR	690 m	MPC · JPL
736854	2015 XX_{227}	—	August 20, 2014	Haleakala	Pan-STARRS 1	AGN	940 m	MPC · JPL
736855	2015 XH_{228}	—	March 12, 2008	Mount Lemmon	Mount Lemmon Survey	·	1.2 km	MPC · JPL
736856	2015 XB_{234}	—	October 5, 2005	Kitt Peak	Spacewatch	·	1.5 km	MPC · JPL
736857	2015 XR_{234}	—	January 19, 2012	Kitt Peak	Spacewatch	AGN	950 m	MPC · JPL
736858	2015 XT_{234}	—	August 3, 2014	Haleakala	Pan-STARRS 1	·	2.3 km	MPC · JPL
736859	2015 XL_{238}	—	November 2, 2010	Mount Lemmon	Mount Lemmon Survey	KOR	1.1 km	MPC · JPL
736860	2015 XB_{240}	—	January 13, 2011	Mount Lemmon	Mount Lemmon Survey	·	2.1 km	MPC · JPL
736861	2015 XW_{242}	—	July 30, 2001	Palomar	NEAT	·	2.0 km	MPC · JPL
736862	2015 XY_{246}	—	October 21, 2006	Catalina	CSS	·	1.7 km	MPC · JPL
736863	2015 XC_{248}	—	December 7, 2015	Haleakala	Pan-STARRS 1	MAR	820 m	MPC · JPL
736864	2015 XF_{251}	—	March 25, 2006	Mount Lemmon	Mount Lemmon Survey	·	3.0 km	MPC · JPL
736865	2015 XC_{254}	—	January 30, 2010	WISE	WISE	·	2.7 km	MPC · JPL
736866	2015 XB_{255}	—	January 19, 2005	Kitt Peak	Spacewatch	·	2.6 km	MPC · JPL
736867	2015 XP_{260}	—	October 25, 2001	Apache Point	SDSS Collaboration	L5	7.0 km	MPC · JPL
736868	2015 XJ_{267}	—	March 26, 2007	Kitt Peak	Spacewatch	·	610 m	MPC · JPL
736869	2015 XJ_{270}	—	June 4, 2013	Mount Lemmon	Mount Lemmon Survey	EOS	1.6 km	MPC · JPL
736870	2015 XT_{273}	—	November 10, 2004	Kitt Peak	Spacewatch	·	3.0 km	MPC · JPL
736871	2015 XN_{275}	—	July 8, 2014	Haleakala	Pan-STARRS 1	WIT	740 m	MPC · JPL
736872	2015 XS_{279}	—	December 7, 2015	Haleakala	Pan-STARRS 1	·	420 m	MPC · JPL
736873	2015 XP_{281}	—	November 19, 2004	Catalina	CSS	·	2.0 km	MPC · JPL
736874	2015 XY_{281}	—	October 4, 2005	Mount Lemmon	Mount Lemmon Survey	·	1.5 km	MPC · JPL
736875	2015 XS_{285}	—	October 25, 2005	Mount Lemmon	Mount Lemmon Survey	KOR	1.0 km	MPC · JPL
736876	2015 XS_{287}	—	December 3, 2015	Mount Lemmon	Mount Lemmon Survey	·	930 m	MPC · JPL
736877	2015 XL_{289}	—	February 5, 2013	Kitt Peak	Spacewatch	·	910 m	MPC · JPL
736878	2015 XO_{292}	—	March 14, 2013	Kitt Peak	Spacewatch	(5)	880 m	MPC · JPL
736879	2015 XJ_{294}	—	February 27, 2006	Mount Lemmon	Mount Lemmon Survey	·	1.9 km	MPC · JPL
736880	2015 XK_{295}	—	October 9, 2010	Kitt Peak	Spacewatch	·	1.4 km	MPC · JPL
736881	2015 XX_{303}	—	November 22, 2015	Mount Lemmon	Mount Lemmon Survey	·	2.0 km	MPC · JPL
736882	2015 XM_{306}	—	March 9, 2007	Mount Lemmon	Mount Lemmon Survey	·	1.4 km	MPC · JPL
736883	2015 XT_{307}	—	September 25, 2014	Kitt Peak	Spacewatch	·	2.1 km	MPC · JPL
736884	2015 XL_{309}	—	November 20, 2001	Socorro	LINEAR	·	3.4 km	MPC · JPL
736885	2015 XT_{311}	—	October 23, 2009	Kitt Peak	Spacewatch	·	2.6 km	MPC · JPL
736886	2015 XY_{311}	—	October 25, 2001	Apache Point	SDSS Collaboration	·	1.7 km	MPC · JPL
736887	2015 XT_{314}	—	September 27, 2009	Mount Lemmon	Mount Lemmon Survey	·	2.6 km	MPC · JPL
736888	2015 XH_{322}	—	July 25, 2014	Haleakala	Pan-STARRS 1	·	1.3 km	MPC · JPL
736889	2015 XU_{324}	—	July 25, 2014	Haleakala	Pan-STARRS 1	HOF	2.2 km	MPC · JPL
736890	2015 XW_{325}	—	January 30, 2011	Mount Lemmon	Mount Lemmon Survey	·	2.5 km	MPC · JPL
736891	2015 XY_{328}	—	July 2, 2010	WISE	WISE	·	1.0 km	MPC · JPL
736892	2015 XV_{331}	—	January 27, 2012	Mount Lemmon	Mount Lemmon Survey	·	1.4 km	MPC · JPL
736893	2015 XX_{333}	—	June 8, 2011	Mount Lemmon	Mount Lemmon Survey	·	520 m	MPC · JPL
736894	2015 XF_{334}	—	July 27, 2001	Palomar	NEAT	·	1.9 km	MPC · JPL
736895	2015 XR_{334}	—	December 8, 2015	Haleakala	Pan-STARRS 1	·	550 m	MPC · JPL
736896	2015 XR_{337}	—	December 6, 2015	Mount Lemmon	Mount Lemmon Survey	TIR	3.0 km	MPC · JPL
736897	2015 XG_{338}	—	February 3, 2012	Haleakala	Pan-STARRS 1	·	1.4 km	MPC · JPL
736898	2015 XF_{345}	—	June 1, 2013	Mount Lemmon	Mount Lemmon Survey	·	1.4 km	MPC · JPL
736899	2015 XO_{345}	—	November 21, 2001	Apache Point	SDSS	·	2.0 km	MPC · JPL
736900	2015 XT_{345}	—	October 25, 2009	Kitt Peak	Spacewatch	·	2.5 km	MPC · JPL

== 736901–737000 ==
back to top

Designation			Discovery			Properties		Ref
Permanent	Provisional	Named after	Date	Site	Discoverer(s)	Category	Diam.	Ref
736901	2015 XV_{345}	—	May 16, 2013	Mount Lemmon	Mount Lemmon Survey	EOS	1.6 km	MPC · JPL
736902	2015 XK_{346}	—	March 16, 2012	Haleakala	Pan-STARRS 1	EOS	1.6 km	MPC · JPL
736903	2015 XE_{347}	—	January 2, 2011	Mount Lemmon	Mount Lemmon Survey	·	1.9 km	MPC · JPL
736904	2015 XR_{347}	—	September 20, 2009	Mount Lemmon	Mount Lemmon Survey	·	2.1 km	MPC · JPL
736905	2015 XN_{348}	—	December 8, 2015	Haleakala	Pan-STARRS 1	EOS	1.5 km	MPC · JPL
736906	2015 XE_{350}	—	October 2, 2002	Kvistaberg	Uppsala-DLR Asteroid Survey	·	1.7 km	MPC · JPL
736907	2015 XH_{350}	—	June 18, 2010	WISE	WISE	·	2.4 km	MPC · JPL
736908	2015 XW_{350}	—	March 20, 2002	Kitt Peak	Deep Ecliptic Survey	MAS	560 m	MPC · JPL
736909	2015 XZ_{353}	—	October 31, 2006	Kitt Peak	Spacewatch	·	1.6 km	MPC · JPL
736910	2015 XV_{355}	—	September 26, 2009	Kitt Peak	Spacewatch	·	2.3 km	MPC · JPL
736911	2015 XL_{357}	—	January 26, 2006	Kitt Peak	Spacewatch	·	2.9 km	MPC · JPL
736912	2015 XC_{358}	—	January 13, 2010	WISE	WISE	·	2.7 km	MPC · JPL
736913	2015 XX_{360}	—	November 2, 2015	Haleakala	Pan-STARRS 1	·	1.9 km	MPC · JPL
736914	2015 XK_{361}	—	August 13, 2006	Palomar	NEAT	·	1.4 km	MPC · JPL
736915	2015 XZ_{361}	—	October 2, 2009	Mount Lemmon	Mount Lemmon Survey	EUP	3.6 km	MPC · JPL
736916	2015 XQ_{363}	—	August 22, 2014	Haleakala	Pan-STARRS 1	·	1.6 km	MPC · JPL
736917	2015 XS_{363}	—	October 29, 1999	Kitt Peak	Spacewatch	EOS	1.3 km	MPC · JPL
736918	2015 XP_{365}	—	October 31, 2010	Mount Lemmon	Mount Lemmon Survey	·	1.8 km	MPC · JPL
736919	2015 XT_{366}	—	December 12, 2015	Haleakala	Pan-STARRS 1	EOS	1.4 km	MPC · JPL
736920	2015 XX_{366}	—	March 2, 2006	Kitt Peak	Spacewatch	·	590 m	MPC · JPL
736921	2015 XJ_{368}	—	July 10, 2010	WISE	WISE	·	2.0 km	MPC · JPL
736922	2015 XN_{368}	—	December 12, 2015	Haleakala	Pan-STARRS 1	·	1.7 km	MPC · JPL
736923	2015 XS_{368}	—	October 27, 2005	Kitt Peak	Spacewatch	KOR	1.3 km	MPC · JPL
736924	2015 XV_{370}	—	March 1, 2012	Mount Lemmon	Mount Lemmon Survey	·	1.8 km	MPC · JPL
736925	2015 XJ_{372}	—	March 6, 2008	Mount Lemmon	Mount Lemmon Survey	·	1.8 km	MPC · JPL
736926	2015 XQ_{375}	—	March 16, 2012	Mount Lemmon	Mount Lemmon Survey	·	1.5 km	MPC · JPL
736927	2015 XL_{376}	—	December 8, 2015	Mount Lemmon	Mount Lemmon Survey	·	2.0 km	MPC · JPL
736928	2015 XX_{379}	—	January 8, 1999	Kitt Peak	Spacewatch	·	990 m	MPC · JPL
736929	2015 XK_{382}	—	May 10, 2007	Mount Lemmon	Mount Lemmon Survey	·	3.9 km	MPC · JPL
736930	2015 XD_{383}	—	February 19, 2010	Mount Lemmon	Mount Lemmon Survey	·	4.8 km	MPC · JPL
736931	2015 XM_{386}	—	October 5, 2013	Kitt Peak	Research and Education Collaborative Occultation Network	L5	6.3 km	MPC · JPL
736932	2015 XL_{392}	—	November 26, 2009	Mount Lemmon	Mount Lemmon Survey	HYG	3.0 km	MPC · JPL
736933	2015 XN_{392}	—	December 20, 2009	Kitt Peak	Spacewatch	·	3.5 km	MPC · JPL
736934	2015 XL_{393}	—	December 11, 2014	Mount Lemmon	Mount Lemmon Survey	EOS	1.7 km	MPC · JPL
736935	2015 XO_{393}	—	April 20, 2010	WISE	WISE	·	3.3 km	MPC · JPL
736936	2015 XW_{393}	—	May 9, 2010	WISE	WISE	·	2.8 km	MPC · JPL
736937	2015 XH_{394}	—	March 14, 2011	Mount Lemmon	Mount Lemmon Survey	·	2.7 km	MPC · JPL
736938	2015 XK_{394}	—	April 13, 2010	WISE	WISE	·	2.5 km	MPC · JPL
736939	2015 XO_{394}	—	September 29, 2003	Anderson Mesa	LONEOS	THB	3.1 km	MPC · JPL
736940	2015 XQ_{394}	—	April 4, 2010	WISE	WISE	·	2.8 km	MPC · JPL
736941	2015 XR_{394}	—	March 17, 2005	Mount Lemmon	Mount Lemmon Survey	·	3.0 km	MPC · JPL
736942	2015 XA_{395}	—	September 23, 2009	Mount Lemmon	Mount Lemmon Survey	·	1.4 km	MPC · JPL
736943	2015 XH_{395}	—	September 24, 2009	Kitt Peak	Spacewatch	·	4.0 km	MPC · JPL
736944	2015 XY_{396}	—	November 24, 2009	Kitt Peak	Spacewatch	·	3.9 km	MPC · JPL
736945	2015 XJ_{397}	—	November 6, 2008	Kitt Peak	Spacewatch	·	3.3 km	MPC · JPL
736946	2015 XN_{399}	—	November 21, 2009	Mount Lemmon	Mount Lemmon Survey	ELF	3.5 km	MPC · JPL
736947	2015 XO_{399}	—	December 9, 2015	Haleakala	Pan-STARRS 1	·	2.5 km	MPC · JPL
736948	2015 XV_{399}	—	December 9, 2015	Haleakala	Pan-STARRS 1	·	2.8 km	MPC · JPL
736949	2015 XC_{400}	—	November 18, 2014	Kitt Peak	Spacewatch	·	3.0 km	MPC · JPL
736950	2015 XK_{400}	—	October 8, 2004	Kitt Peak	Spacewatch	·	1.4 km	MPC · JPL
736951	2015 XP_{400}	—	September 27, 2009	Mount Lemmon	Mount Lemmon Survey	·	1.7 km	MPC · JPL
736952	2015 XP_{401}	—	November 24, 2009	Kitt Peak	Spacewatch	·	2.2 km	MPC · JPL
736953	2015 XZ_{401}	—	November 25, 2009	Mount Lemmon	Mount Lemmon Survey	·	1.6 km	MPC · JPL
736954	2015 XN_{402}	—	November 19, 2009	Mount Lemmon	Mount Lemmon Survey	·	2.9 km	MPC · JPL
736955	2015 XX_{402}	—	October 13, 2014	Mount Lemmon	Mount Lemmon Survey	·	2.3 km	MPC · JPL
736956	2015 XY_{402}	—	December 4, 2015	Mount Lemmon	Mount Lemmon Survey	·	3.0 km	MPC · JPL
736957	2015 XA_{403}	—	November 22, 2014	Haleakala	Pan-STARRS 1	·	2.2 km	MPC · JPL
736958	2015 XO_{404}	—	July 31, 2005	Palomar	NEAT	AGN	1.1 km	MPC · JPL
736959	2015 XX_{405}	—	April 15, 2012	Haleakala	Pan-STARRS 1	·	2.2 km	MPC · JPL
736960	2015 XX_{406}	—	August 23, 2014	Haleakala	Pan-STARRS 1	EOS	1.4 km	MPC · JPL
736961	2015 XB_{407}	—	September 26, 2000	Apache Point	SDSS Collaboration	·	1.9 km	MPC · JPL
736962	2015 XJ_{407}	—	January 12, 2013	Bergisch Gladbach	W. Bickel	·	620 m	MPC · JPL
736963	2015 XX_{407}	—	November 12, 2005	Kitt Peak	Spacewatch	·	1.8 km	MPC · JPL
736964	2015 XD_{410}	—	April 13, 2000	Kitt Peak	Spacewatch	·	2.6 km	MPC · JPL
736965	2015 XY_{410}	—	October 22, 2009	Mount Lemmon	Mount Lemmon Survey	·	2.3 km	MPC · JPL
736966	2015 XC_{411}	—	January 17, 2004	Kitt Peak	Spacewatch	·	1.1 km	MPC · JPL
736967	2015 XX_{411}	—	December 8, 2015	Haleakala	Pan-STARRS 1	·	1.3 km	MPC · JPL
736968	2015 XP_{412}	—	October 10, 2010	Kitt Peak	Spacewatch	·	1.3 km	MPC · JPL
736969	2015 XW_{412}	—	December 8, 2015	Haleakala	Pan-STARRS 1	·	2.5 km	MPC · JPL
736970	2015 XW_{413}	—	July 25, 2014	Haleakala	Pan-STARRS 1	HOF	2.0 km	MPC · JPL
736971	2015 XH_{415}	—	November 20, 2014	Mount Lemmon	Mount Lemmon Survey	·	2.5 km	MPC · JPL
736972	2015 XS_{416}	—	February 4, 2010	WISE	WISE	·	1.9 km	MPC · JPL
736973	2015 XY_{417}	—	November 30, 2014	Mount Lemmon	Mount Lemmon Survey	·	1.4 km	MPC · JPL
736974	2015 XD_{418}	—	October 29, 2014	Haleakala	Pan-STARRS 1	·	2.5 km	MPC · JPL
736975	2015 XW_{421}	—	October 16, 2015	Mount Lemmon	Mount Lemmon Survey	·	1.8 km	MPC · JPL
736976	2015 XB_{422}	—	December 9, 2015	Haleakala	Pan-STARRS 1	·	1.9 km	MPC · JPL
736977	2015 XZ_{440}	—	December 8, 2015	Haleakala	Pan-STARRS 1	V	480 m	MPC · JPL
736978	2015 XP_{442}	—	December 5, 2015	Haleakala	Pan-STARRS 1	NAE	1.7 km	MPC · JPL
736979	2015 XL_{443}	—	December 10, 2015	Mount Lemmon	Mount Lemmon Survey	·	740 m	MPC · JPL
736980	2015 XV_{448}	—	December 9, 2015	Haleakala	Pan-STARRS 1	·	2.4 km	MPC · JPL
736981	2015 XA_{456}	—	December 10, 2015	Haleakala	Pan-STARRS 1	·	2.5 km	MPC · JPL
736982	2015 XD_{460}	—	December 14, 2015	Mount Lemmon	Mount Lemmon Survey	·	2.6 km	MPC · JPL
736983	2015 XJ_{473}	—	December 8, 2015	Haleakala	Pan-STARRS 1	KOR	1.1 km	MPC · JPL
736984	2015 XF_{475}	—	August 27, 2014	Haleakala	Pan-STARRS 1	·	1.5 km	MPC · JPL
736985	2015 XT_{479}	—	December 8, 2015	Haleakala	Pan-STARRS 1	·	1.6 km	MPC · JPL
736986	2015 YZ_{6}	—	December 13, 2009	Mount Lemmon	Mount Lemmon Survey	·	3.5 km	MPC · JPL
736987	2015 YQ_{7}	—	October 22, 2003	Apache Point	SDSS Collaboration	·	2.4 km	MPC · JPL
736988	2015 YN_{9}	—	March 23, 1993	Kitt Peak	Spacewatch	·	1.7 km	MPC · JPL
736989	2015 YJ_{10}	—	September 19, 2001	Palomar	NEAT	H	690 m	MPC · JPL
736990	2015 YH_{15}	—	March 3, 2006	Catalina	CSS	·	2.5 km	MPC · JPL
736991	2015 YV_{16}	—	February 27, 2010	WISE	WISE	·	3.2 km	MPC · JPL
736992	2015 YW_{16}	—	February 15, 2010	WISE	WISE	·	2.5 km	MPC · JPL
736993	2015 YX_{16}	—	March 11, 2011	Catalina	CSS	TIR	2.3 km	MPC · JPL
736994	2015 YP_{17}	—	March 24, 2006	Mount Lemmon	Mount Lemmon Survey	ARM	3.8 km	MPC · JPL
736995	2015 YY_{17}	—	April 21, 2011	Haleakala	Pan-STARRS 1	·	2.7 km	MPC · JPL
736996	2015 YX_{19}	—	January 28, 2010	WISE	WISE	·	3.5 km	MPC · JPL
736997	2015 YQ_{22}	—	March 11, 2008	Catalina	CSS	EUN	3.6 km	MPC · JPL
736998	2015 YF_{23}	—	August 24, 2008	Kitt Peak	Spacewatch	·	3.3 km	MPC · JPL
736999	2015 YG_{23}	—	September 19, 2014	Haleakala	Pan-STARRS 1	·	2.1 km	MPC · JPL
737000	2015 YK_{23}	—	February 15, 2010	Catalina	CSS	·	4.8 km	MPC · JPL

back to top
