= Guy Touvron =

French trumpeter (1950–2024)

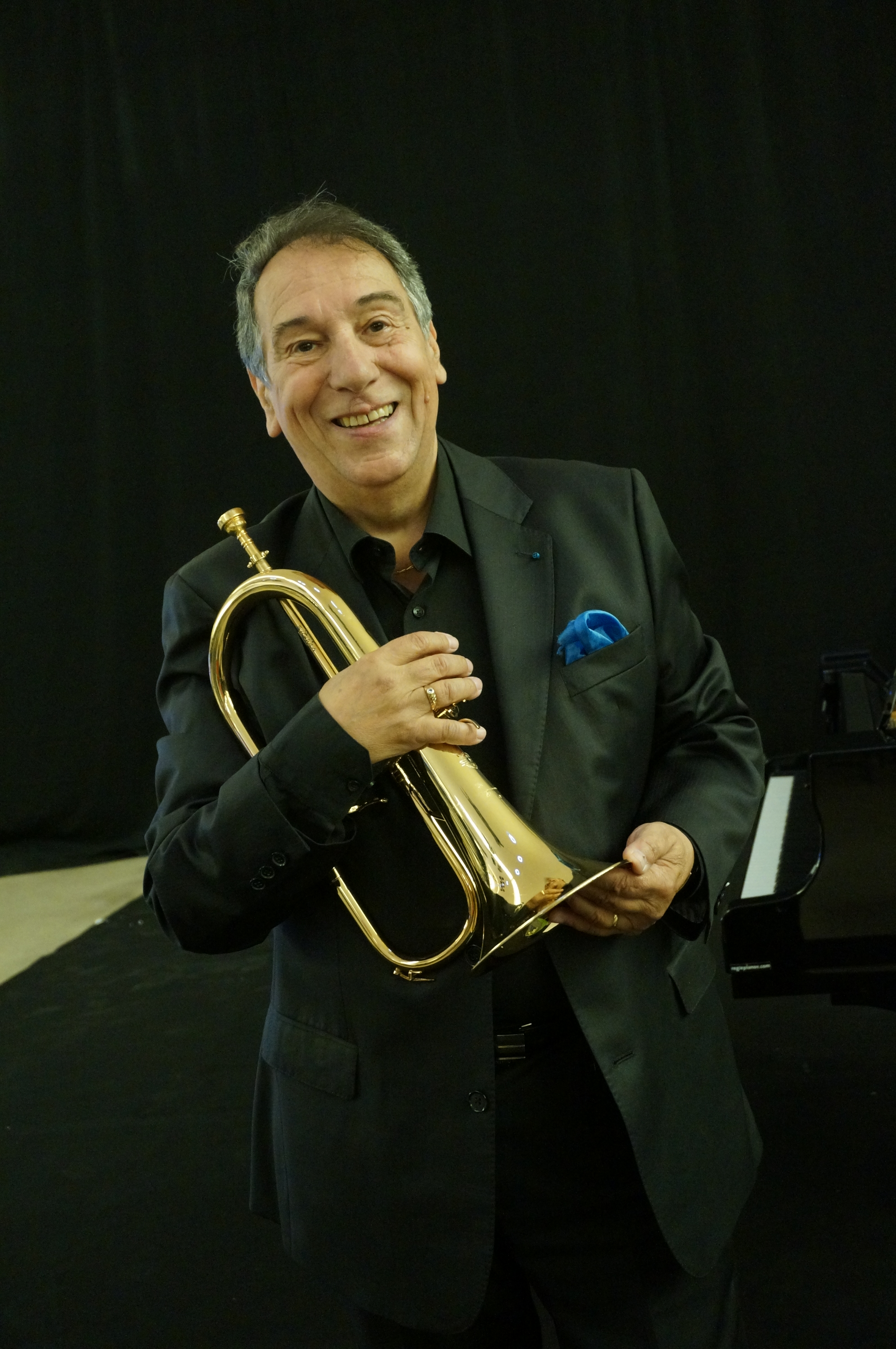
- Touvron in 2014
- Born: 15 February 1950; Vichy, France
- Died: 9 March 2024 (aged 74)
- Education: Conservatoire de Paris
- Occupations: Classical trumpet player; Academic teacher
- Organizations: Guy Touvron Brass Ensemble
- Website: www.guy-touvron.fr

Guy Touvron (15 February 1950 – 9 March 2024) was a French classical trumpet player and music teacher. He was an accomplished soloist, having played with some of Europe's leading orchestras. He premiered several prominent trumpet concertos written for him. Touvron gave over 3,500 concerts, made over 120 recordings, and won several prizes.

Touvron also taught trumpet and regularly conducted master classes around the world. He has been called "one of the leading pedagogues of trumpet technique and interpretation France has ever produced." He wrote a biography on his mentor Maurice André, which was published in 2003.

In 2020, Touvron was convicted of having sexually assaulted a young woman in 2017. He was given a six-month suspended prison sentence.

== Life and career ==
Guy Touvron was born on 15 February 1950 in Vichy. While his parents were not musicians, his grandfather played the cornet. At the age of ten Touvron started playing the cornet, and after a few years he became proficient on both the cornet and trumpet. In 1967, Touvron enrolled at the Conservatoire de Paris and studied under classical virtuoso trumpeter Maurice André. A year later the Conservatory awarded Touvron first prize for cornet, and a year after that, first prize for trumpet.

Touvron held the position of principal trumpet for the Orchestre National de Lyon between 1969 and 1971, and for the French Radio Philharmonic Orchestra between 1971 and 1974. In 1973, he formed his own group, the Guy Touvron Brass Ensemble. He was a faculty member of the Conservatoire à rayonnement régional in Paris. He regularly conducted master classes around the world, including at the Juilliard School in New York City, the Royal Northern College of Music in Manchester, and the Schola Cantorum Basiliensis.

Many of Touvron's performances are of works by baroque composers like Bach, Albinoni and Torelli, but he also performed contemporary classical music and has premiered several prominent trumpet concertos by Ivan Jevtić, Jacques Loussier, François Rauber and others. Over 25 compositions were written for him, including by composers such as Karol Beffa, Charles Chaynes, Graciane Finzi, Anthony Girard and Alain Margoni.

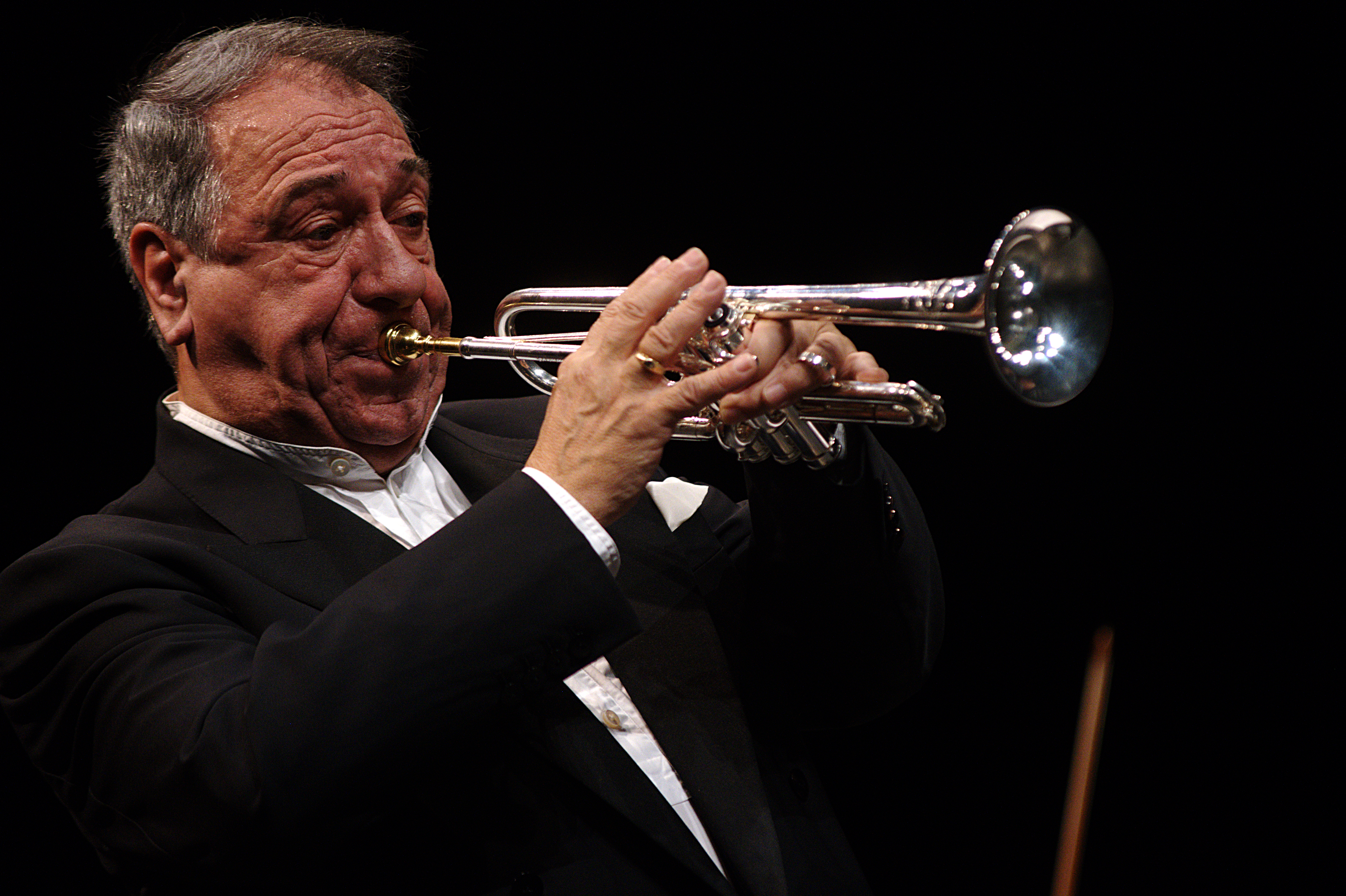
Touvron in concert in 2017

Touvron performed with orchestras such as I Solisti Veneti, the Toulouse Chamber Orchestra, English Chamber Orchestra, the Mozarteum Orchestra Salzburg, the orchestra of La Scala in Milan, the Lucerne Festival Strings, the Prague Chamber Orchestra, Orchestre national du Capitole de Toulouse, Orchestre national d’Auvergne,Orchestre national de Lille, Symphonia Varsovia, Staatskapelle Dresden, Bavarian Radio Symphony Orchestra and the Czech Philharmonic. He regularly appeared in festivals at Lille, the Prades Festival and Bachwoche Ansbach. He played at the Salzburg Festival, Pollenca Festival in Spain, Lanaudière Festival in Canada, Stresa in Italy and the Montreux Festival, and appeared regularly in the United States, all European countries, Japan and China.

Touvron made more than 120 recordings, gave over 3,500 concerts, and won several prizes, including three international Grands Prix, in Munich, Geneva and Prague. In the early 2000s, Touvron wrote a biography on his mentor Maurice André entitled Maurice André: Une trompette pour la renommée (Maurice André: A Trumpet for Fame), which was published in 2003.

Touvron's reputation was tarnished when he was found guilty in 2020 of having sexually assaulted a young woman in 2017; he was given a six-month suspended prison sentence. He was investigated for rape of another young woman from 2021, pleading innocent.

Asteroid 278197 Touvron, discovered by French astronomer Jean-Claude Merlin in 2007, was named in his honor. The official naming citation was published by the Minor Planet Center on 5 January 2015 (M.P.C. 91792).

Touvron died suddenly on 9 March 2024, at the age of 74.

== Recordings ==
Touvron recorded together with conductors such as Jean-Claude Casadesus, Yehudi Menuhin, Michel Plasson and Claudio Scimone. Recordings with Touvron include:

- with Wolfgang Karius: Splendour & Magnificence: Glory of the Baroque Trumpet (2007)
- Trompette – Etudes Françaises du XXè Siècle (2000)
- with Franck Pulcini: Sonnez Trompettes (1995)
- with Carine Clement: Le Concert
- with Luigi Celeghin: Fantasia per tromba e organo (1985)
- with Nelly Cotin: Pavane
- with Isabelle Régis: Les plus beaux Noëls de nos Provinces
- with Nelly Cotin: La Trompette de toutes les Mélodies
- with soprano Barbara Löcher: Cantate 51 – J.S. Bach / Sur les rives du Tibre – Scarlatti (1990)
- with Daniel Colin: Trompette au bal musette (2001)
- with Marie Rigaud, Catherine Ramona and Isabelle Ramona: Capricci armonici (1997)

Recordings as soloist include:

- with Orchestra Antonio Vivaldi: Hommage à l'Europe (2001)
- with Prague Chamber Orchestra: Mozart – Touvron
- with Orchestre d'Harmonie de la Garde Républicaine: De List à Nougaro
- with Orchestre d'Harmonie de la ville de Vichy: Orchestre d'Harmonie de la ville de Vichy avec Guy Touvron

Recordings with his own ensembles include:

- Guy Touvron Brass Ensemble: Ensemble de cuivres Guy Touvron
- Guy Touvron Brass Ensemble: Gershwin (1992)
- Guy Touvron Quintette: Ragtimes (1992)

== Books ==
- Touvron, Guy (9 October 2003). Maurice André: Une trompette pour la renommée. Monaco: Editions du Rocher. ISBN 9782268047850. OCLC 53297277. Biography of Maurice André.
