= Meanings of minor-planet names: 278001–279000 =

As minor planet discoveries are confirmed, they are given a permanent number by the IAU's Minor Planet Center (MPC), and the discoverers can then submit names for them, following the IAU's naming conventions. The list below concerns those minor planets in the specified number-range that have received names, and explains the meanings of those names.

Official naming citations of newly named small Solar System bodies are approved and published in a bulletin by IAU's Working Group for Small Bodies Nomenclature (WGSBN). Before May 2021, citations were published in MPC's Minor Planet Circulars for many decades. Recent citations can also be found on the JPL Small-Body Database (SBDB). Until his death in 2016, German astronomer Lutz D. Schmadel compiled these citations into the Dictionary of Minor Planet Names (DMP) and regularly updated the collection.

Based on Paul Herget's The Names of the Minor Planets, Schmadel also researched the unclear origin of numerous asteroids, most of which had been named prior to World War II. This article incorporates text from this source, which is in the public domain: SBDB New namings may only be added to this list below after official publication as the preannouncement of names is condemned. The WGSBN publishes a comprehensive guideline for the naming rules of non-cometary small Solar System bodies.

== 278001–278100 ==
Named minor planet	Provisional	This minor planet was named for...	Ref · Catalog
There are no named minor planets in this number range

== 278101–278200 ==
back to top

Named minor planet	Provisional	This minor planet was named for...	Ref · Catalog
278141 Tatooine	2007 CS_{61}	Tatooine is a desert planet in the fictional Star Wars universe. It is the home planet of Anakin and Luke Skywalker.	JPL · 278141
278197 Touvron	2007 EL_{12}	Guy Touvron (born 1950), a French Classical trumpet player and music teacher	JPL · 278197
278200 Olegpopov	2007 EV_{26}	Oleg Popov (1930–2016), a famous Russian circus artist	JPL · 278200

== 278201–278300 ==
back to top

Named minor planet	Provisional	This minor planet was named for...	Ref · Catalog
278225 Didierpelat	2007 EY_{87}	Didier Pelat (born 1948) is an astronomer at Paris Observatory, who has worked on spectroscopy and modelling of active galactic nuclei, hydrodynamics of accretion disks and stellar populations synthesis. He has also designed an iterative Bracewell interferometer extending the nulling effect to a large bandwidth.	JPL · 278225

== 278301–278400 ==
back to top

Named minor planet	Provisional	This minor planet was named for...	Ref · Catalog
278384 Mudanjiang	2007 MV_{20}	The Chinese city of Mudanjiang, located in the country's northernmost province of Heilongjiang	JPL · 278384
278386 Sofivanna	2007 NK_{2}	Twins Sofia and Ivanna (born 2007) are the grandchildren of Boris Romanyuk, Professor at the V. Ye. Lashkaryov Institute of Semiconductor Physics of the National Academy of Sciences of Ukraine.	JPL · 278386

== 278401–278500 ==
back to top

Named minor planet	Provisional	This minor planet was named for...	Ref · Catalog
278417 Kerschbaum	2007 RR_{146}	Franz Kerschbaum, Austrian astrophysicist at the University of Vienna.	IAU · 278417
278447 Saviano	2007 TH	Roberto Saviano (born 1979), an Italian journalist, writer and essayist	JPL · 278447

== 278501–278600 ==
back to top

Named minor planet	Provisional	This minor planet was named for...	Ref · Catalog
278513 Schwope	2008 CE_{120}	Axel Schwope (born 1959), a German astronomer at the Leibniz Institute for Astrophysics in Potsdam	JPL · 278513
278591 Salò	2008 NZ_{3}	The historic town of Salò on the western bank of Lake Garda in northern Italy	JPL · 278591

== 278601–278700 ==
back to top

Named minor planet	Provisional	This minor planet was named for...	Ref · Catalog
278609 Avrudenko	2008 PP_{17}	Anatoliy Viktorovych Rudenko (born 1955), a Ukrainian scientist and surgeon	JPL · 278609
278640 Elenačernienė	2008 RZ_{5}	Elena Černienė (born 1961), Lithuanian amateur astronomer, who teaches at the Vilnius Senvagės Gymnasium.	JPL · 278640
278645 Kontsevych	2008 RQ_{22}	Yevgen Vasylyovych Kontsevych (1935–2010) was a Ukrainian novelist and short story writer. In his works he often compared people's relationships with the behavior of birds and wild animals, preferring communication with the latter, rather than with the deceptive and treacherous-by-nature humans.	JPL · 278645
278690 Rockenbauer	2008 RZ_{118}	Pál Rockenbauer, Hungarian nature lover, world traveler, television editor, and one of the founders of nature film-making on television in Hungary.	IAU · 278690

== 278701–278800 ==
back to top

Named minor planet	Provisional	This minor planet was named for...	Ref · Catalog
278735 Kamioka	2008 SG_{83}	The Kamioka Observatory, Institute for Cosmic Ray Research is a neutrino physics laboratory located underground of the city of Hida in Gifu Prefecture, Japan.	JPL · 278735

== 278801–278900 ==
back to top

Named minor planet	Provisional	This minor planet was named for...	Ref · Catalog
There are no named minor planets in this number range

== 278901–279000 ==
back to top

Named minor planet	Provisional	This minor planet was named for...	Ref · Catalog
278956 Shei-Pa	2008 UZ_{83}	Shei-Pa National Park is located in the central part of Taiwan around the peaks of Hsuehshan and Dabajian Mountain, with an area of 76,850 hectares. There are 51 peaks over 3,000 meters high.	JPL · 278956
278986 Chenshuchu	2008 UQ_{205}	Chen Shu-chu, a vegetable vendor and philanthropist from Taitung in Eastern Taiwan	JPL · 278986

back to top

Preceded by 277,001–278,000	Meanings of minor-planet names List of minor planets: 278,001–279,000	Succeeded by 279,001–280,000
