= List of minor planets: 278001–279000 =

The following is a partial list of minor planets, running from minor-planet number 278001 through 279000, inclusive. The primary data for this and other partial lists is based on JPL's "Small-Body Orbital Elements" and data available from the Minor Planet Center. Critical list information is also provided by the MPC, unless otherwise specified from Lowell Observatory. A detailed description of the table's columns and additional sources are given on the main page including a complete list of every page in this series, and a statistical break-up on the dynamical classification of minor planets.

Also see the summary list of all named bodies in numerical and alphabetical order, and the corresponding naming citations for the number range of this particular list. New namings may only be added to this list after official publication, as the preannouncement of names is condemned by the Working Group for Small Bodies Nomenclature of the International Astronomical Union.

Near-Earth obj.	MBA (inner)	MBA (outer)	Centaur
Mars-crosser	MBA (middle)	Jupiter trojan	Trans-Neptunian obj.
Unclassified

== 278001–278100 ==
Designation			Discovery			Properties		Ref
Permanent	Provisional	Named after	Date	Site	Discoverer(s)	Category	Diam.	Ref
278001	2006 UT_{104}	—	October 18, 2006	Kitt Peak	Spacewatch	·	1.5 km	MPC · JPL
278002	2006 US_{105}	—	October 18, 2006	Kitt Peak	Spacewatch	·	2.2 km	MPC · JPL
278003	2006 UC_{118}	—	October 19, 2006	Kitt Peak	Spacewatch	·	4.1 km	MPC · JPL
278004	2006 UE_{126}	—	October 19, 2006	Kitt Peak	Spacewatch	·	540 m	MPC · JPL
278005	2006 UR_{127}	—	October 19, 2006	Kitt Peak	Spacewatch	·	560 m	MPC · JPL
278006	2006 UE_{168}	—	October 21, 2006	Mount Lemmon	Mount Lemmon Survey	fast	900 m	MPC · JPL
278007	2006 UC_{188}	—	October 19, 2006	Catalina	CSS	·	1.9 km	MPC · JPL
278008	2006 UJ_{190}	—	October 19, 2006	Catalina	CSS	·	880 m	MPC · JPL
278009	2006 UJ_{197}	—	October 20, 2006	Kitt Peak	Spacewatch	·	730 m	MPC · JPL
278010	2006 UN_{202}	—	October 22, 2006	Palomar	NEAT	·	1.9 km	MPC · JPL
278011	2006 UC_{204}	—	October 22, 2006	Palomar	NEAT	·	2.4 km	MPC · JPL
278012	2006 UR_{214}	—	October 23, 2006	Mount Lemmon	Mount Lemmon Survey	EOS	2.3 km	MPC · JPL
278013	2006 UB_{220}	—	October 16, 2006	Catalina	CSS	·	810 m	MPC · JPL
278014	2006 UB_{240}	—	October 23, 2006	Kitt Peak	Spacewatch	ADE	2.0 km	MPC · JPL
278015	2006 UH_{260}	—	October 28, 2006	Mount Lemmon	Mount Lemmon Survey	·	560 m	MPC · JPL
278016	2006 VS	—	November 1, 2006	Mount Lemmon	Mount Lemmon Survey	·	810 m	MPC · JPL
278017	2006 VV_{16}	—	November 9, 2006	Kitt Peak	Spacewatch	·	900 m	MPC · JPL
278018	2006 VM_{25}	—	November 10, 2006	Kitt Peak	Spacewatch	·	2.0 km	MPC · JPL
278019	2006 VK_{29}	—	November 10, 2006	Kitt Peak	Spacewatch	·	720 m	MPC · JPL
278020	2006 VJ_{34}	—	November 11, 2006	Catalina	CSS	·	850 m	MPC · JPL
278021	2006 VK_{44}	—	November 13, 2006	Catalina	CSS	NYS	1.2 km	MPC · JPL
278022	2006 VN_{51}	—	November 10, 2006	Kitt Peak	Spacewatch	NYS	1.2 km	MPC · JPL
278023	2006 VX_{57}	—	November 11, 2006	Kitt Peak	Spacewatch	·	2.2 km	MPC · JPL
278024	2006 VK_{64}	—	November 11, 2006	Kitt Peak	Spacewatch	·	670 m	MPC · JPL
278025	2006 VP_{95}	—	November 1, 2006	Catalina	CSS	(2076)	960 m	MPC · JPL
278026	2006 VJ_{96}	—	November 10, 2006	Kitt Peak	Spacewatch	·	2.5 km	MPC · JPL
278027	2006 VC_{105}	—	November 13, 2006	Kitt Peak	Spacewatch	·	1.6 km	MPC · JPL
278028	2006 VG_{139}	—	November 15, 2006	Kitt Peak	Spacewatch	EUN	2.0 km	MPC · JPL
278029	2006 VP_{146}	—	November 15, 2006	Catalina	CSS	·	1.8 km	MPC · JPL
278030	2006 WM_{4}	—	November 19, 2006	Socorro	LINEAR	·	940 m	MPC · JPL
278031	2006 WH_{15}	—	November 16, 2006	Lulin	Chang, M.-T., Q. Ye	·	840 m	MPC · JPL
278032	2006 WL_{23}	—	November 17, 2006	Mount Lemmon	Mount Lemmon Survey	EUN	1.5 km	MPC · JPL
278033	2006 WO_{26}	—	November 18, 2006	Socorro	LINEAR	·	2.2 km	MPC · JPL
278034	2006 WN_{31}	—	November 16, 2006	Kitt Peak	Spacewatch	·	810 m	MPC · JPL
278035	2006 WP_{36}	—	November 16, 2006	Kitt Peak	Spacewatch	·	700 m	MPC · JPL
278036	2006 WU_{54}	—	November 16, 2006	Kitt Peak	Spacewatch	·	1.3 km	MPC · JPL
278037	2006 WW_{55}	—	November 16, 2006	Mount Lemmon	Mount Lemmon Survey	NYS	1.3 km	MPC · JPL
278038	2006 WE_{67}	—	November 17, 2006	Mount Lemmon	Mount Lemmon Survey	GAL	2.2 km	MPC · JPL
278039	2006 WO_{69}	—	November 17, 2006	Mount Lemmon	Mount Lemmon Survey	·	1.0 km	MPC · JPL
278040	2006 WR_{79}	—	November 18, 2006	Kitt Peak	Spacewatch	·	820 m	MPC · JPL
278041	2006 WV_{79}	—	November 18, 2006	Kitt Peak	Spacewatch	·	720 m	MPC · JPL
278042	2006 WJ_{86}	—	November 18, 2006	Socorro	LINEAR	·	930 m	MPC · JPL
278043	2006 WN_{87}	—	November 18, 2006	Mount Lemmon	Mount Lemmon Survey	·	1.6 km	MPC · JPL
278044	2006 WG_{115}	—	November 20, 2006	Socorro	LINEAR	T_{j} (2.95) · HIL	7.2 km	MPC · JPL
278045	2006 WS_{149}	—	November 20, 2006	Kitt Peak	Spacewatch	·	2.9 km	MPC · JPL
278046	2006 WV_{157}	—	November 22, 2006	Catalina	CSS	·	770 m	MPC · JPL
278047	2006 WY_{162}	—	November 23, 2006	Kitt Peak	Spacewatch	ADE	3.0 km	MPC · JPL
278048	2006 WY_{172}	—	November 23, 2006	Kitt Peak	Spacewatch	·	2.7 km	MPC · JPL
278049	2006 WU_{178}	—	November 24, 2006	Kitt Peak	Spacewatch	·	630 m	MPC · JPL
278050	2006 WP_{182}	—	November 24, 2006	Kitt Peak	Spacewatch	·	890 m	MPC · JPL
278051	2006 WR_{188}	—	November 24, 2006	Kitt Peak	Spacewatch	·	1.0 km	MPC · JPL
278052	2006 WB_{190}	—	November 25, 2006	Catalina	CSS	·	1.0 km	MPC · JPL
278053	2006 WG_{201}	—	November 16, 2006	Mount Lemmon	Mount Lemmon Survey	EOS	2.4 km	MPC · JPL
278054	2006 XZ_{13}	—	December 10, 2006	Kitt Peak	Spacewatch	·	820 m	MPC · JPL
278055	2006 XK_{20}	—	December 11, 2006	Kitt Peak	Spacewatch	·	1.2 km	MPC · JPL
278056	2006 XP_{26}	—	December 12, 2006	Catalina	CSS	·	720 m	MPC · JPL
278057	2006 XA_{57}	—	December 13, 2006	Socorro	LINEAR	·	2.1 km	MPC · JPL
278058	2006 XB_{60}	—	December 14, 2006	Kitt Peak	Spacewatch	·	840 m	MPC · JPL
278059	2006 XY_{66}	—	December 14, 2006	Palomar	NEAT	·	2.9 km	MPC · JPL
278060	2006 XO_{70}	—	December 15, 2006	Mount Lemmon	Mount Lemmon Survey	(883)	1.1 km	MPC · JPL
278061	2006 YR_{9}	—	December 21, 2006	Kitt Peak	Spacewatch	·	940 m	MPC · JPL
278062	2006 YF_{17}	—	December 21, 2006	Mount Lemmon	Mount Lemmon Survey	·	1.3 km	MPC · JPL
278063	2006 YM_{18}	—	December 23, 2006	Mount Lemmon	Mount Lemmon Survey	·	1.8 km	MPC · JPL
278064	2006 YS_{21}	—	December 21, 2006	Kitt Peak	Spacewatch	·	970 m	MPC · JPL
278065	2006 YZ_{34}	—	December 21, 2006	Kitt Peak	Spacewatch	·	770 m	MPC · JPL
278066	2006 YC_{36}	—	December 21, 2006	Kitt Peak	Spacewatch	·	2.4 km	MPC · JPL
278067	2006 YY_{40}	—	December 22, 2006	Kitt Peak	Spacewatch	·	1.3 km	MPC · JPL
278068	2006 YO_{51}	—	December 27, 2006	Mount Lemmon	Mount Lemmon Survey	NYS	1.3 km	MPC · JPL
278069	2006 YW_{52}	—	December 24, 2006	Kitt Peak	Spacewatch	MAS	780 m	MPC · JPL
278070	2007 AP	—	January 8, 2007	Catalina	CSS	NYS	1.0 km	MPC · JPL
278071	2007 AL_{4}	—	January 8, 2007	Catalina	CSS	·	1.7 km	MPC · JPL
278072	2007 AB_{7}	—	January 9, 2007	Mount Lemmon	Mount Lemmon Survey	·	1.9 km	MPC · JPL
278073	2007 AV_{12}	—	January 9, 2007	Palomar	NEAT	NYS	990 m	MPC · JPL
278074	2007 AL_{14}	—	January 9, 2007	Mount Lemmon	Mount Lemmon Survey	·	1.7 km	MPC · JPL
278075	2007 AA_{18}	—	January 8, 2007	Catalina	CSS	·	1.1 km	MPC · JPL
278076	2007 AD_{22}	—	January 15, 2007	Kitt Peak	Spacewatch	·	4.0 km	MPC · JPL
278077	2007 AA_{24}	—	January 10, 2007	Mount Lemmon	Mount Lemmon Survey	NYS	1.7 km	MPC · JPL
278078	2007 AQ_{24}	—	January 15, 2007	Catalina	CSS	·	1.8 km	MPC · JPL
278079	2007 AG_{27}	—	January 10, 2007	Mount Lemmon	Mount Lemmon Survey	·	1.3 km	MPC · JPL
278080	2007 AK_{29}	—	January 10, 2007	Kitt Peak	Spacewatch	EOS	2.3 km	MPC · JPL
278081	2007 BN	—	January 16, 2007	Socorro	LINEAR	·	810 m	MPC · JPL
278082	2007 BW	—	January 16, 2007	Socorro	LINEAR	·	1.2 km	MPC · JPL
278083	2007 BP_{5}	—	January 17, 2007	Catalina	CSS	·	1.1 km	MPC · JPL
278084	2007 BK_{9}	—	January 17, 2007	Palomar	NEAT	·	1.0 km	MPC · JPL
278085	2007 BJ_{10}	—	January 17, 2007	Kitt Peak	Spacewatch	·	1 km	MPC · JPL
278086	2007 BZ_{10}	—	January 17, 2007	Kitt Peak	Spacewatch	·	760 m	MPC · JPL
278087	2007 BE_{14}	—	January 17, 2007	Kitt Peak	Spacewatch	·	1.1 km	MPC · JPL
278088	2007 BZ_{14}	—	January 17, 2007	Kitt Peak	Spacewatch	(2076)	880 m	MPC · JPL
278089	2007 BR_{15}	—	April 16, 2004	Kitt Peak	Spacewatch	·	810 m	MPC · JPL
278090	2007 BL_{19}	—	January 21, 2007	Socorro	LINEAR	(5)	1.5 km	MPC · JPL
278091	2007 BZ_{19}	—	January 23, 2007	Socorro	LINEAR	·	1.3 km	MPC · JPL
278092	2007 BK_{20}	—	January 23, 2007	Anderson Mesa	LONEOS	·	1.0 km	MPC · JPL
278093	2007 BP_{20}	—	January 23, 2007	Anderson Mesa	LONEOS	·	2.3 km	MPC · JPL
278094	2007 BS_{24}	—	January 24, 2007	Mount Lemmon	Mount Lemmon Survey	·	1.0 km	MPC · JPL
278095	2007 BW_{27}	—	January 24, 2007	Mount Lemmon	Mount Lemmon Survey	·	1.0 km	MPC · JPL
278096	2007 BR_{29}	—	January 24, 2007	Socorro	LINEAR	·	1.4 km	MPC · JPL
278097	2007 BV_{29}	—	January 24, 2007	Socorro	LINEAR	·	1.1 km	MPC · JPL
278098	2007 BO_{31}	—	January 26, 2007	Calvin-Rehoboth	L. A. Molnar	·	1.0 km	MPC · JPL
278099	2007 BE_{45}	—	January 25, 2007	Catalina	CSS	·	1.2 km	MPC · JPL
278100	2007 BQ_{46}	—	January 26, 2007	Kitt Peak	Spacewatch	·	1.4 km	MPC · JPL

== 278101–278200 ==
back to top

Designation			Discovery			Properties		Ref
Permanent	Provisional	Named after	Date	Site	Discoverer(s)	Category	Diam.	Ref
278101	2007 BO_{48}	—	January 26, 2007	Kitt Peak	Spacewatch	·	1.3 km	MPC · JPL
278102	2007 BS_{53}	—	January 24, 2007	Kitt Peak	Spacewatch	·	1.0 km	MPC · JPL
278103	2007 BG_{56}	—	January 24, 2007	Socorro	LINEAR	·	2.2 km	MPC · JPL
278104	2007 BJ_{65}	—	January 27, 2007	Mount Lemmon	Mount Lemmon Survey	·	1.5 km	MPC · JPL
278105	2007 BX_{65}	—	January 27, 2007	Mount Lemmon	Mount Lemmon Survey	NYS	1.4 km	MPC · JPL
278106	2007 BX_{67}	—	January 27, 2007	Kitt Peak	Spacewatch	CYB	6.2 km	MPC · JPL
278107	2007 BG_{75}	—	January 28, 2007	Mount Lemmon	Mount Lemmon Survey	NYS	1.4 km	MPC · JPL
278108	2007 BJ_{75}	—	January 28, 2007	Mount Lemmon	Mount Lemmon Survey	·	2.5 km	MPC · JPL
278109	2007 BF_{77}	—	January 16, 2007	Catalina	CSS	·	1.2 km	MPC · JPL
278110	2007 BN_{81}	—	January 29, 2007	Kitt Peak	Spacewatch	·	1.1 km	MPC · JPL
278111	2007 BO_{100}	—	January 19, 2007	Mauna Kea	Mauna Kea	·	800 m	MPC · JPL
278112	2007 CK	—	February 5, 2007	Palomar	NEAT	·	850 m	MPC · JPL
278113	2007 CW	—	February 6, 2007	Kitt Peak	Spacewatch	MAS	670 m	MPC · JPL
278114	2007 CY	—	February 6, 2007	Kitt Peak	Spacewatch	·	1.2 km	MPC · JPL
278115	2007 CR_{1}	—	February 6, 2007	Kitt Peak	Spacewatch	MAS	770 m	MPC · JPL
278116	2007 CA_{4}	—	February 6, 2007	Mount Lemmon	Mount Lemmon Survey	·	1.1 km	MPC · JPL
278117	2007 CA_{5}	—	February 6, 2007	Mount Lemmon	Mount Lemmon Survey	MAS	640 m	MPC · JPL
278118	2007 CX_{8}	—	February 6, 2007	Kitt Peak	Spacewatch	MAS	750 m	MPC · JPL
278119	2007 CE_{10}	—	February 6, 2007	Mount Lemmon	Mount Lemmon Survey	·	3.4 km	MPC · JPL
278120	2007 CB_{12}	—	February 6, 2007	Kitt Peak	Spacewatch	·	1.2 km	MPC · JPL
278121	2007 CY_{13}	—	February 7, 2007	Kitt Peak	Spacewatch	(5)	1.8 km	MPC · JPL
278122	2007 CG_{19}	—	February 5, 2007	Palomar	NEAT	·	2.0 km	MPC · JPL
278123	2007 CM_{21}	—	February 6, 2007	Palomar	NEAT	·	900 m	MPC · JPL
278124	2007 CM_{28}	—	February 6, 2007	Kitt Peak	Spacewatch	MAS	830 m	MPC · JPL
278125	2007 CG_{33}	—	February 6, 2007	Mount Lemmon	Mount Lemmon Survey	·	940 m	MPC · JPL
278126	2007 CP_{34}	—	February 6, 2007	Palomar	NEAT	·	920 m	MPC · JPL
278127	2007 CG_{36}	—	February 6, 2007	Kitt Peak	Spacewatch	·	1.6 km	MPC · JPL
278128	2007 CB_{40}	—	February 6, 2007	Mount Lemmon	Mount Lemmon Survey	·	1 km	MPC · JPL
278129	2007 CT_{44}	—	February 8, 2007	Palomar	NEAT	·	2.7 km	MPC · JPL
278130	2007 CH_{45}	—	February 8, 2007	Palomar	NEAT	·	1.3 km	MPC · JPL
278131	2007 CZ_{45}	—	February 8, 2007	Palomar	NEAT	·	1.9 km	MPC · JPL
278132	2007 CD_{46}	—	February 8, 2007	Palomar	NEAT	·	1.2 km	MPC · JPL
278133	2007 CZ_{47}	—	February 10, 2007	Mount Lemmon	Mount Lemmon Survey	NYS	1.1 km	MPC · JPL
278134	2007 CJ_{51}	—	February 11, 2007	Charleston	Astronomical Research Observatory	·	950 m	MPC · JPL
278135	2007 CS_{51}	—	February 8, 2007	Palomar	NEAT	·	1.6 km	MPC · JPL
278136	2007 CF_{52}	—	February 9, 2007	Catalina	CSS	·	3.7 km	MPC · JPL
278137	2007 CH_{52}	—	February 10, 2007	Palomar	NEAT	·	960 m	MPC · JPL
278138	2007 CU_{52}	—	February 10, 2007	Mount Lemmon	Mount Lemmon Survey	NYS	1.3 km	MPC · JPL
278139	2007 CZ_{52}	—	February 13, 2007	Socorro	LINEAR	·	1.5 km	MPC · JPL
278140	2007 CL_{59}	—	February 10, 2007	Catalina	CSS	·	1.3 km	MPC · JPL
278141 Tatooine	2007 CS_{61}	Tatooine	February 15, 2007	Taunus	Karge, S., E. Schwab	·	1.4 km	MPC · JPL
278142	2007 CG_{62}	—	February 10, 2007	Catalina	CSS	·	1.4 km	MPC · JPL
278143	2007 CN_{62}	—	February 13, 2007	Socorro	LINEAR	MAS	860 m	MPC · JPL
278144	2007 CX_{64}	—	February 8, 2007	Kitt Peak	Spacewatch	NYS	1.1 km	MPC · JPL
278145	2007 CD_{66}	—	February 9, 2007	Catalina	CSS	EUP	5.0 km	MPC · JPL
278146	2007 DW_{2}	—	February 16, 2007	Catalina	CSS	·	2.2 km	MPC · JPL
278147	2007 DA_{3}	—	February 16, 2007	Catalina	CSS	·	1.2 km	MPC · JPL
278148	2007 DP_{5}	—	February 17, 2007	Kitt Peak	Spacewatch	VER	3.3 km	MPC · JPL
278149	2007 DB_{12}	—	February 16, 2007	Catalina	CSS	·	1.1 km	MPC · JPL
278150	2007 DO_{15}	—	February 17, 2007	Kitt Peak	Spacewatch	·	890 m	MPC · JPL
278151	2007 DP_{17}	—	February 17, 2007	Kitt Peak	Spacewatch	·	1.1 km	MPC · JPL
278152	2007 DD_{19}	—	February 17, 2007	Kitt Peak	Spacewatch	NYS	1.3 km	MPC · JPL
278153	2007 DN_{19}	—	April 6, 1995	Kitt Peak	Spacewatch	(5)	1.2 km	MPC · JPL
278154	2007 DR_{21}	—	February 17, 2007	Kitt Peak	Spacewatch	·	1.1 km	MPC · JPL
278155	2007 DA_{23}	—	February 17, 2007	Kitt Peak	Spacewatch	MAS	720 m	MPC · JPL
278156	2007 DZ_{28}	—	February 17, 2007	Kitt Peak	Spacewatch	V	600 m	MPC · JPL
278157	2007 DM_{33}	—	February 17, 2007	Kitt Peak	Spacewatch	·	1.2 km	MPC · JPL
278158	2007 DS_{33}	—	February 17, 2007	Kitt Peak	Spacewatch	V	880 m	MPC · JPL
278159	2007 DA_{34}	—	February 17, 2007	Kitt Peak	Spacewatch	NYS	1.3 km	MPC · JPL
278160	2007 DJ_{34}	—	February 17, 2007	Kitt Peak	Spacewatch	NYS	1.6 km	MPC · JPL
278161	2007 DH_{35}	—	February 17, 2007	Kitt Peak	Spacewatch	·	1.6 km	MPC · JPL
278162	2007 DN_{35}	—	February 17, 2007	Kitt Peak	Spacewatch	V	790 m	MPC · JPL
278163	2007 DO_{35}	—	February 17, 2007	Kitt Peak	Spacewatch	L5	11 km	MPC · JPL
278164	2007 DZ_{38}	—	February 17, 2007	Kitt Peak	Spacewatch	·	2.9 km	MPC · JPL
278165	2007 DE_{41}	—	February 20, 2007	Lulin	LUSS	H	700 m	MPC · JPL
278166	2007 DY_{52}	—	February 19, 2007	Mount Lemmon	Mount Lemmon Survey	·	1.4 km	MPC · JPL
278167	2007 DX_{54}	—	February 21, 2007	Socorro	LINEAR	NYS	1.2 km	MPC · JPL
278168	2007 DE_{55}	—	February 21, 2007	Socorro	LINEAR	NYS	1.3 km	MPC · JPL
278169	2007 DU_{55}	—	February 21, 2007	Kitt Peak	Spacewatch	NYS	2.0 km	MPC · JPL
278170	2007 DE_{56}	—	February 21, 2007	Socorro	LINEAR	·	2.7 km	MPC · JPL
278171	2007 DA_{71}	—	February 21, 2007	Kitt Peak	Spacewatch	·	1.3 km	MPC · JPL
278172	2007 DM_{72}	—	November 10, 2005	Kitt Peak	Spacewatch	·	1.9 km	MPC · JPL
278173	2007 DK_{82}	—	February 23, 2007	Kitt Peak	Spacewatch	·	1.3 km	MPC · JPL
278174	2007 DR_{82}	—	February 23, 2007	Socorro	LINEAR	·	2.3 km	MPC · JPL
278175	2007 DS_{82}	—	February 23, 2007	Socorro	LINEAR	·	1.3 km	MPC · JPL
278176	2007 DX_{82}	—	February 23, 2007	Kitt Peak	Spacewatch	MAS	750 m	MPC · JPL
278177	2007 DF_{86}	—	February 21, 2007	Kitt Peak	Spacewatch	NYS	1.3 km	MPC · JPL
278178	2007 DT_{88}	—	February 23, 2007	Kitt Peak	Spacewatch	MAS	920 m	MPC · JPL
278179	2007 DO_{90}	—	February 23, 2007	Kitt Peak	Spacewatch	EUN	1.9 km	MPC · JPL
278180	2007 DC_{91}	—	February 23, 2007	Mount Lemmon	Mount Lemmon Survey	NEM	2.8 km	MPC · JPL
278181	2007 DD_{92}	—	February 23, 2007	Kitt Peak	Spacewatch	·	1.2 km	MPC · JPL
278182	2007 DV_{96}	—	February 23, 2007	Kitt Peak	Spacewatch	·	2.1 km	MPC · JPL
278183	2007 DV_{97}	—	February 23, 2007	Kitt Peak	Spacewatch	·	1.2 km	MPC · JPL
278184	2007 DR_{98}	—	February 25, 2007	Mount Lemmon	Mount Lemmon Survey	MAS	860 m	MPC · JPL
278185	2007 DE_{99}	—	February 25, 2007	Mount Lemmon	Mount Lemmon Survey	·	1.4 km	MPC · JPL
278186	2007 DB_{106}	—	February 23, 2007	Mount Lemmon	Mount Lemmon Survey	·	1.1 km	MPC · JPL
278187	2007 DT_{110}	—	February 21, 2007	Kitt Peak	Spacewatch	MAS	960 m	MPC · JPL
278188	2007 DW_{110}	—	February 22, 2007	Kitt Peak	Spacewatch	·	1.3 km	MPC · JPL
278189	2007 DO_{114}	—	February 26, 2007	Mount Lemmon	Mount Lemmon Survey	NYS	1.4 km	MPC · JPL
278190	2007 EP_{1}	—	March 9, 2007	Kitt Peak	Spacewatch	NYS	1.1 km	MPC · JPL
278191	2007 EH_{2}	—	March 9, 2007	Kitt Peak	Spacewatch	·	1.0 km	MPC · JPL
278192	2007 ED_{4}	—	March 9, 2007	Kitt Peak	Spacewatch	·	1.9 km	MPC · JPL
278193	2007 EF_{4}	—	March 9, 2007	Palomar	NEAT	·	1.3 km	MPC · JPL
278194	2007 EC_{11}	—	March 9, 2007	Kitt Peak	Spacewatch	·	1.0 km	MPC · JPL
278195	2007 ET_{11}	—	March 9, 2007	Palomar	NEAT	·	1.9 km	MPC · JPL
278196	2007 EJ_{12}	—	March 9, 2007	Palomar	NEAT	·	1.8 km	MPC · JPL
278197 Touvron	2007 EL_{12}	Touvron	March 9, 2007	Nogales	J.-C. Merlin	·	4.5 km	MPC · JPL
278198	2007 EO_{12}	—	March 9, 2007	Goodricke-Pigott	R. A. Tucker	MAS	1.0 km	MPC · JPL
278199	2007 EU_{22}	—	March 10, 2007	Mount Lemmon	Mount Lemmon Survey	·	1.5 km	MPC · JPL
278200 Olegpopov	2007 EV_{26}	Olegpopov	March 11, 2007	Wildberg	R. Apitzsch	·	2.1 km	MPC · JPL

== 278201–278300 ==
back to top

Designation			Discovery			Properties		Ref
Permanent	Provisional	Named after	Date	Site	Discoverer(s)	Category	Diam.	Ref
278201	2007 EL_{30}	—	March 9, 2007	Palomar	NEAT	·	1.1 km	MPC · JPL
278202	2007 EP_{30}	—	March 10, 2007	Kitt Peak	Spacewatch	NYS	1.2 km	MPC · JPL
278203	2007 EY_{30}	—	March 10, 2007	Kitt Peak	Spacewatch	·	910 m	MPC · JPL
278204	2007 EH_{34}	—	March 10, 2007	Eskridge	G. Hug	NYS	1.3 km	MPC · JPL
278205	2007 EJ_{34}	—	March 10, 2007	Eskridge	G. Hug	·	2.2 km	MPC · JPL
278206	2007 EM_{34}	—	March 10, 2007	Palomar	NEAT	·	1.5 km	MPC · JPL
278207	2007 EN_{36}	—	March 11, 2007	Kitt Peak	Spacewatch	·	1.0 km	MPC · JPL
278208	2007 ED_{37}	—	March 11, 2007	Mount Lemmon	Mount Lemmon Survey	NYS	1.2 km	MPC · JPL
278209	2007 ES_{37}	—	March 11, 2007	Mount Lemmon	Mount Lemmon Survey	·	1.4 km	MPC · JPL
278210	2007 EQ_{38}	—	March 11, 2007	Kitt Peak	Spacewatch	·	1.4 km	MPC · JPL
278211	2007 EX_{38}	—	March 11, 2007	Vicques	M. Ory	·	1.3 km	MPC · JPL
278212	2007 EG_{42}	—	March 9, 2007	Kitt Peak	Spacewatch	·	1.9 km	MPC · JPL
278213	2007 EL_{42}	—	March 9, 2007	Kitt Peak	Spacewatch	·	1.8 km	MPC · JPL
278214	2007 EX_{42}	—	March 9, 2007	Kitt Peak	Spacewatch	·	2.5 km	MPC · JPL
278215	2007 EF_{44}	—	March 9, 2007	Kitt Peak	Spacewatch	·	1.6 km	MPC · JPL
278216	2007 EG_{47}	—	March 9, 2007	Kitt Peak	Spacewatch	MAS	850 m	MPC · JPL
278217	2007 EK_{54}	—	March 12, 2007	Kitt Peak	Spacewatch	MAS	750 m	MPC · JPL
278218	2007 EZ_{64}	—	March 10, 2007	Kitt Peak	Spacewatch	MAS	680 m	MPC · JPL
278219	2007 EM_{68}	—	March 10, 2007	Palomar	NEAT	V	940 m	MPC · JPL
278220	2007 EU_{72}	—	March 10, 2007	Kitt Peak	Spacewatch	EUN	1.2 km	MPC · JPL
278221	2007 ES_{78}	—	March 10, 2007	Palomar	NEAT	·	2.1 km	MPC · JPL
278222	2007 ED_{80}	—	March 10, 2007	Palomar	NEAT	·	2.2 km	MPC · JPL
278223	2007 EJ_{81}	—	March 11, 2007	Kitt Peak	Spacewatch	·	2.2 km	MPC · JPL
278224	2007 EL_{85}	—	March 12, 2007	Kitt Peak	Spacewatch	MAR	1.3 km	MPC · JPL
278225 Didierpelat	2007 EY_{87}	Didierpelat	March 12, 2007	Saint-Sulpice	B. Christophe	·	1.4 km	MPC · JPL
278226	2007 EX_{89}	—	March 9, 2007	Mount Lemmon	Mount Lemmon Survey	·	1.4 km	MPC · JPL
278227	2007 EX_{95}	—	March 10, 2007	Mount Lemmon	Mount Lemmon Survey	NYS	1.8 km	MPC · JPL
278228	2007 EN_{98}	—	March 11, 2007	Kitt Peak	Spacewatch	·	1.4 km	MPC · JPL
278229	2007 EV_{99}	—	March 11, 2007	Kitt Peak	Spacewatch	·	1.6 km	MPC · JPL
278230	2007 EM_{108}	—	March 11, 2007	Kitt Peak	Spacewatch	·	2.9 km	MPC · JPL
278231	2007 EB_{109}	—	March 11, 2007	Kitt Peak	Spacewatch	AEO	1.6 km	MPC · JPL
278232	2007 EZ_{109}	—	March 11, 2007	Kitt Peak	Spacewatch	·	1.2 km	MPC · JPL
278233	2007 ES_{114}	—	March 13, 2007	Mount Lemmon	Mount Lemmon Survey	·	1.5 km	MPC · JPL
278234	2007 EE_{115}	—	March 13, 2007	Mount Lemmon	Mount Lemmon Survey	·	1.2 km	MPC · JPL
278235	2007 EW_{119}	—	March 13, 2007	Mount Lemmon	Mount Lemmon Survey	KON	2.5 km	MPC · JPL
278236	2007 EX_{124}	—	March 14, 2007	Mount Lemmon	Mount Lemmon Survey	·	1.6 km	MPC · JPL
278237	2007 EY_{125}	—	March 10, 2007	Palomar	NEAT	·	1.6 km	MPC · JPL
278238	2007 EJ_{139}	—	March 12, 2007	Kitt Peak	Spacewatch	NYS	1.5 km	MPC · JPL
278239	2007 EL_{140}	—	March 12, 2007	Mount Lemmon	Mount Lemmon Survey	·	1.3 km	MPC · JPL
278240	2007 EW_{140}	—	March 12, 2007	Kitt Peak	Spacewatch	·	1.6 km	MPC · JPL
278241	2007 EL_{144}	—	March 12, 2007	Mount Lemmon	Mount Lemmon Survey	·	1.4 km	MPC · JPL
278242	2007 EN_{149}	—	March 12, 2007	Mount Lemmon	Mount Lemmon Survey	·	1.3 km	MPC · JPL
278243	2007 EW_{149}	—	March 12, 2007	Mount Lemmon	Mount Lemmon Survey	·	1.6 km	MPC · JPL
278244	2007 ED_{150}	—	March 12, 2007	Mount Lemmon	Mount Lemmon Survey	HYG	3.8 km	MPC · JPL
278245	2007 ED_{152}	—	March 12, 2007	Mount Lemmon	Mount Lemmon Survey	NEM	2.6 km	MPC · JPL
278246	2007 EP_{155}	—	March 12, 2007	Kitt Peak	Spacewatch	·	1.9 km	MPC · JPL
278247	2007 EA_{167}	—	March 11, 2007	Kitt Peak	Spacewatch	EUN	1.9 km	MPC · JPL
278248	2007 EZ_{167}	—	March 13, 2007	Kitt Peak	Spacewatch	·	1.1 km	MPC · JPL
278249	2007 EH_{168}	—	March 13, 2007	Kitt Peak	Spacewatch	·	1.7 km	MPC · JPL
278250	2007 EM_{170}	—	March 15, 2007	Kitt Peak	Spacewatch	·	1.1 km	MPC · JPL
278251	2007 EF_{177}	—	March 14, 2007	Catalina	CSS	NYS	1.3 km	MPC · JPL
278252	2007 EX_{189}	—	March 13, 2007	Mount Lemmon	Mount Lemmon Survey	NYS	1.5 km	MPC · JPL
278253	2007 EP_{190}	—	March 13, 2007	Mount Lemmon	Mount Lemmon Survey	·	1.5 km	MPC · JPL
278254	2007 EN_{191}	—	March 13, 2007	Kitt Peak	Spacewatch	·	1.3 km	MPC · JPL
278255	2007 EF_{203}	—	March 10, 2007	Palomar	NEAT	NYS	1.2 km	MPC · JPL
278256	2007 EB_{212}	—	March 8, 2007	Palomar	NEAT	NYS	1.1 km	MPC · JPL
278257	2007 EW_{213}	—	March 10, 2007	Mount Lemmon	Mount Lemmon Survey	·	3.2 km	MPC · JPL
278258	2007 EH_{214}	—	March 10, 2007	Mount Lemmon	Mount Lemmon Survey	·	1.4 km	MPC · JPL
278259	2007 ER_{216}	—	March 14, 2007	Catalina	CSS	(10369)	3.6 km	MPC · JPL
278260	2007 ED_{221}	—	March 13, 2007	Kitt Peak	Spacewatch	AGN	1.6 km	MPC · JPL
278261	2007 EL_{221}	—	March 15, 2007	Kitt Peak	Spacewatch	·	1.3 km	MPC · JPL
278262	2007 ET_{221}	—	March 15, 2007	Kitt Peak	Spacewatch	·	1.2 km	MPC · JPL
278263	2007 FQ_{7}	—	March 16, 2007	Mount Lemmon	Mount Lemmon Survey	MAS	1.0 km	MPC · JPL
278264	2007 FN_{20}	—	March 16, 2007	Mount Lemmon	Mount Lemmon Survey	NYS	1.4 km	MPC · JPL
278265	2007 FF_{23}	—	March 20, 2007	Kitt Peak	Spacewatch	NYS	1.3 km	MPC · JPL
278266	2007 FV_{30}	—	March 20, 2007	Mount Lemmon	Mount Lemmon Survey	·	1.8 km	MPC · JPL
278267	2007 FY_{30}	—	March 20, 2007	Mount Lemmon	Mount Lemmon Survey	·	1.0 km	MPC · JPL
278268	2007 FK_{32}	—	March 20, 2007	Kitt Peak	Spacewatch	·	1.7 km	MPC · JPL
278269	2007 FD_{34}	—	March 25, 2007	Mount Lemmon	Mount Lemmon Survey	·	1.1 km	MPC · JPL
278270	2007 FE_{36}	—	March 26, 2007	Mount Lemmon	Mount Lemmon Survey	·	1.9 km	MPC · JPL
278271	2007 FT_{37}	—	March 26, 2007	Mount Lemmon	Mount Lemmon Survey	·	1.5 km	MPC · JPL
278272	2007 FS_{46}	—	March 29, 2007	Palomar	NEAT	·	2.4 km	MPC · JPL
278273	2007 FR_{47}	—	March 26, 2007	Kitt Peak	Spacewatch	·	2.1 km	MPC · JPL
278274	2007 FU_{49}	—	March 25, 2007	Mount Lemmon	Mount Lemmon Survey	GEF	2.0 km	MPC · JPL
278275	2007 GF_{2}	—	April 10, 2007	Altschwendt	W. Ries	·	1.1 km	MPC · JPL
278276	2007 GF_{10}	—	April 11, 2007	Kitt Peak	Spacewatch	·	1.4 km	MPC · JPL
278277	2007 GO_{17}	—	April 11, 2007	Kitt Peak	Spacewatch	·	1.1 km	MPC · JPL
278278	2007 GT_{17}	—	April 11, 2007	Kitt Peak	Spacewatch	·	1.7 km	MPC · JPL
278279	2007 GV_{19}	—	April 11, 2007	Kitt Peak	Spacewatch	·	1.7 km	MPC · JPL
278280	2007 GF_{23}	—	April 11, 2007	Mount Lemmon	Mount Lemmon Survey	·	1.2 km	MPC · JPL
278281	2007 GM_{24}	—	April 11, 2007	Kitt Peak	Spacewatch	·	1.2 km	MPC · JPL
278282	2007 GC_{27}	—	April 14, 2007	Kitt Peak	Spacewatch	·	1.5 km	MPC · JPL
278283	2007 GO_{27}	—	April 15, 2007	Vicques	M. Ory	·	4.3 km	MPC · JPL
278284	2007 GE_{28}	—	April 15, 2007	Catalina	CSS	·	1.9 km	MPC · JPL
278285	2007 GP_{33}	—	April 11, 2007	Mount Lemmon	Mount Lemmon Survey	KON	2.2 km	MPC · JPL
278286	2007 GZ_{36}	—	April 14, 2007	Kitt Peak	Spacewatch	·	1.2 km	MPC · JPL
278287	2007 GZ_{38}	—	April 14, 2007	Kitt Peak	Spacewatch	·	2.0 km	MPC · JPL
278288	2007 GS_{42}	—	April 14, 2007	Kitt Peak	Spacewatch	·	1.7 km	MPC · JPL
278289	2007 GN_{44}	—	April 14, 2007	Kitt Peak	Spacewatch	·	1.4 km	MPC · JPL
278290	2007 GU_{47}	—	April 14, 2007	Mount Lemmon	Mount Lemmon Survey	·	1.8 km	MPC · JPL
278291	2007 GF_{50}	—	August 25, 2000	Kitt Peak	Spacewatch	EUN	1.6 km	MPC · JPL
278292	2007 GT_{50}	—	April 15, 2007	Socorro	LINEAR	·	1.9 km	MPC · JPL
278293	2007 GG_{51}	—	April 15, 2007	Kitt Peak	Spacewatch	·	1.3 km	MPC · JPL
278294	2007 GS_{51}	—	April 14, 2007	Kitt Peak	Spacewatch	·	1.4 km	MPC · JPL
278295	2007 GX_{60}	—	April 15, 2007	Kitt Peak	Spacewatch	·	1.1 km	MPC · JPL
278296	2007 GL_{61}	—	April 15, 2007	Kitt Peak	Spacewatch	AGN	1.2 km	MPC · JPL
278297	2007 GT_{63}	—	April 15, 2007	Kitt Peak	Spacewatch	·	1 km	MPC · JPL
278298	2007 GU_{63}	—	April 15, 2007	Kitt Peak	Spacewatch	·	1.2 km	MPC · JPL
278299	2007 GB_{64}	—	April 15, 2007	Kitt Peak	Spacewatch	·	1.4 km	MPC · JPL
278300	2007 GB_{65}	—	April 15, 2007	Kitt Peak	Spacewatch	·	2.1 km	MPC · JPL

== 278301–278400 ==
back to top

Designation			Discovery			Properties		Ref
Permanent	Provisional	Named after	Date	Site	Discoverer(s)	Category	Diam.	Ref
278301	2007 GZ_{76}	—	April 15, 2007	Catalina	CSS	·	1.9 km	MPC · JPL
278302	2007 GO_{77}	—	April 11, 2007	Kitt Peak	Spacewatch	·	2.1 km	MPC · JPL
278303	2007 HY	—	April 17, 2007	Vicques	M. Ory	·	1.4 km	MPC · JPL
278304	2007 HD_{8}	—	April 18, 2007	Mount Lemmon	Mount Lemmon Survey	KOR	1.4 km	MPC · JPL
278305	2007 HX_{9}	—	April 18, 2007	Mount Lemmon	Mount Lemmon Survey	(5)	1.4 km	MPC · JPL
278306	2007 HG_{11}	—	April 18, 2007	Kitt Peak	Spacewatch	·	1.3 km	MPC · JPL
278307	2007 HS_{12}	—	April 16, 2007	Mount Lemmon	Mount Lemmon Survey	MAS	920 m	MPC · JPL
278308	2007 HZ_{12}	—	April 16, 2007	Catalina	CSS	EUN	1.5 km	MPC · JPL
278309	2007 HP_{15}	—	April 19, 2007	Mayhill	Lowe, A.	·	2.4 km	MPC · JPL
278310	2007 HH_{17}	—	April 16, 2007	Catalina	CSS	(18466)	3.4 km	MPC · JPL
278311	2007 HA_{19}	—	April 18, 2007	Mount Lemmon	Mount Lemmon Survey	MAS	880 m	MPC · JPL
278312	2007 HP_{19}	—	April 18, 2007	Kitt Peak	Spacewatch	·	1.9 km	MPC · JPL
278313	2007 HS_{23}	—	April 18, 2007	Kitt Peak	Spacewatch	·	1.7 km	MPC · JPL
278314	2007 HP_{25}	—	April 18, 2007	Mount Lemmon	Mount Lemmon Survey	(5)	1.4 km	MPC · JPL
278315	2007 HY_{25}	—	April 18, 2007	Kitt Peak	Spacewatch	·	1.3 km	MPC · JPL
278316	2007 HP_{27}	—	April 18, 2007	Kitt Peak	Spacewatch	RAF	990 m	MPC · JPL
278317	2007 HV_{33}	—	April 19, 2007	Kitt Peak	Spacewatch	·	1.2 km	MPC · JPL
278318	2007 HR_{39}	—	April 20, 2007	Mount Lemmon	Mount Lemmon Survey	·	1.2 km	MPC · JPL
278319	2007 HG_{40}	—	April 20, 2007	Mount Lemmon	Mount Lemmon Survey	KOR	1.8 km	MPC · JPL
278320	2007 HT_{45}	—	April 18, 2007	Kitt Peak	Spacewatch	·	1.0 km	MPC · JPL
278321	2007 HY_{45}	—	April 19, 2007	Anderson Mesa	LONEOS	V	920 m	MPC · JPL
278322	2007 HT_{46}	—	April 20, 2007	Kitt Peak	Spacewatch	·	1.8 km	MPC · JPL
278323	2007 HU_{47}	—	April 20, 2007	Kitt Peak	Spacewatch	·	1.4 km	MPC · JPL
278324	2007 HX_{51}	—	April 20, 2007	Kitt Peak	Spacewatch	BRG	2.1 km	MPC · JPL
278325	2007 HB_{54}	—	April 15, 2007	Catalina	CSS	·	4.1 km	MPC · JPL
278326	2007 HX_{54}	—	April 22, 2007	Kitt Peak	Spacewatch	·	1.7 km	MPC · JPL
278327	2007 HA_{59}	—	April 24, 2007	Kitt Peak	Spacewatch	T_{j} (2.63) · APO +1km	2.9 km	MPC · JPL
278328	2007 HX_{60}	—	April 20, 2007	Socorro	LINEAR	·	1.6 km	MPC · JPL
278329	2007 HJ_{66}	—	April 22, 2007	Mount Lemmon	Mount Lemmon Survey	·	2.0 km	MPC · JPL
278330	2007 HN_{66}	—	April 22, 2007	Mount Lemmon	Mount Lemmon Survey	·	2.3 km	MPC · JPL
278331	2007 HY_{68}	—	April 23, 2007	Siding Spring	SSS	·	1.6 km	MPC · JPL
278332	2007 HL_{69}	—	April 24, 2007	Kitt Peak	Spacewatch	·	2.4 km	MPC · JPL
278333	2007 HK_{77}	—	April 23, 2007	Kitt Peak	Spacewatch	·	1.4 km	MPC · JPL
278334	2007 HQ_{79}	—	April 23, 2007	Mount Lemmon	Mount Lemmon Survey	EUN	1.8 km	MPC · JPL
278335	2007 HW_{79}	—	April 24, 2007	Kitt Peak	Spacewatch	·	2.0 km	MPC · JPL
278336	2007 HO_{84}	—	April 22, 2007	Mount Lemmon	Mount Lemmon Survey	·	1.3 km	MPC · JPL
278337	2007 HT_{87}	—	April 25, 2007	Kitt Peak	Spacewatch	·	1.7 km	MPC · JPL
278338	2007 HQ_{90}	—	April 22, 2007	Catalina Station	Catalina Station	MAS	670 m	MPC · JPL
278339	2007 HF_{91}	—	April 18, 2007	Mount Lemmon	Mount Lemmon Survey	·	2.1 km	MPC · JPL
278340	2007 HS_{97}	—	April 22, 2007	Mount Lemmon	Mount Lemmon Survey	HNS	2.6 km	MPC · JPL
278341	2007 JH	—	May 7, 2007	Mount Lemmon	Mount Lemmon Survey	MAR	1.2 km	MPC · JPL
278342	2007 JS	—	May 7, 2007	Mount Lemmon	Mount Lemmon Survey	·	2.2 km	MPC · JPL
278343	2007 JU	—	May 7, 2007	Mount Lemmon	Mount Lemmon Survey	·	2.2 km	MPC · JPL
278344	2007 JV_{1}	—	May 7, 2007	Catalina	CSS	·	1.3 km	MPC · JPL
278345	2007 JA_{3}	—	May 6, 2007	Bergisch Gladbach	W. Bickel	·	1.6 km	MPC · JPL
278346	2007 JK_{4}	—	May 7, 2007	Catalina	CSS	EUN	1.5 km	MPC · JPL
278347	2007 JW_{10}	—	May 7, 2007	Kitt Peak	Spacewatch	·	1.2 km	MPC · JPL
278348	2007 JH_{13}	—	May 8, 2007	Kitt Peak	Spacewatch	·	3.0 km	MPC · JPL
278349	2007 JV_{16}	—	May 7, 2007	Kitt Peak	Spacewatch	·	1.8 km	MPC · JPL
278350	2007 JL_{18}	—	May 9, 2007	Kitt Peak	Spacewatch	·	2.4 km	MPC · JPL
278351	2007 JX_{22}	—	May 11, 2007	Lulin	LUSS	EUN	4.4 km	MPC · JPL
278352	2007 JL_{23}	—	May 7, 2007	Catalina	CSS	·	2.1 km	MPC · JPL
278353	2007 JL_{24}	—	May 9, 2007	Kitt Peak	Spacewatch	MAR	1.4 km	MPC · JPL
278354	2007 JO_{24}	—	May 9, 2007	Kitt Peak	Spacewatch	THB	3.9 km	MPC · JPL
278355	2007 JF_{26}	—	May 9, 2007	Kitt Peak	Spacewatch	·	2.3 km	MPC · JPL
278356	2007 JZ_{26}	—	May 9, 2007	Kitt Peak	Spacewatch	·	1.8 km	MPC · JPL
278357	2007 JD_{29}	—	May 10, 2007	Mount Lemmon	Mount Lemmon Survey	·	1.6 km	MPC · JPL
278358	2007 JH_{32}	—	May 12, 2007	Kitt Peak	Spacewatch	·	1.7 km	MPC · JPL
278359	2007 JT_{37}	—	May 12, 2007	Mount Lemmon	Mount Lemmon Survey	·	1.6 km	MPC · JPL
278360 Tangdingyuan	2007 JU_{40}	Tangdingyuan	May 12, 2007	Purple Mountain	PMO NEO Survey Program	·	2.6 km	MPC · JPL
278361	2007 JJ_{43}	—	May 14, 2007	Palomar Mountain	M. E. Schwamb, M. E. Brown, D. Rabinowitz	cubewano (hot)	598 km	MPC · JPL
278362	2007 KZ_{1}	—	May 18, 2007	Tiki	S. F. Hönig, Teamo, N.	EUN	1.4 km	MPC · JPL
278363	2007 KE_{2}	—	May 18, 2007	Pla D'Arguines	R. Ferrando	·	2.0 km	MPC · JPL
278364	2007 KL_{3}	—	May 22, 2007	Tiki	S. F. Hönig, Teamo, N.	·	1.2 km	MPC · JPL
278365	2007 KR_{7}	—	May 16, 2007	Purple Mountain	PMO NEO Survey Program	·	2.8 km	MPC · JPL
278366	2007 KJ_{8}	—	May 21, 2007	Anderson Mesa	LONEOS	·	3.0 km	MPC · JPL
278367	2007 KP_{9}	—	May 16, 2007	Kitt Peak	Spacewatch	·	1.6 km	MPC · JPL
278368	2007 LU_{1}	—	June 7, 2007	Kitt Peak	Spacewatch	·	1.6 km	MPC · JPL
278369	2007 LF_{5}	—	June 9, 2007	Kitt Peak	Spacewatch	·	2.4 km	MPC · JPL
278370	2007 LU_{5}	—	June 7, 2007	Kitt Peak	Spacewatch	KON	3.2 km	MPC · JPL
278371	2007 LK_{7}	—	June 8, 2007	Kitt Peak	Spacewatch	·	1.9 km	MPC · JPL
278372	2007 LP_{7}	—	June 8, 2007	Catalina	CSS	·	2.3 km	MPC · JPL
278373	2007 LU_{8}	—	June 9, 2007	Kitt Peak	Spacewatch	·	3.0 km	MPC · JPL
278374	2007 LO_{9}	—	June 8, 2007	Kitt Peak	Spacewatch	ADE	3.9 km	MPC · JPL
278375	2007 LJ_{10}	—	June 9, 2007	Kitt Peak	Spacewatch	·	2.2 km	MPC · JPL
278376	2007 LZ_{16}	—	June 10, 2007	Kitt Peak	Spacewatch	·	2.4 km	MPC · JPL
278377	2007 LJ_{20}	—	June 9, 2007	Kitt Peak	Spacewatch	·	1.5 km	MPC · JPL
278378	2007 LD_{24}	—	June 14, 2007	Kitt Peak	Spacewatch	EOS	2.0 km	MPC · JPL
278379	2007 LU_{26}	—	June 14, 2007	Kitt Peak	Spacewatch	·	2.5 km	MPC · JPL
278380	2007 LU_{28}	—	June 15, 2007	Kitt Peak	Spacewatch	·	1.6 km	MPC · JPL
278381	2007 MR	—	June 18, 2007	Catalina	CSS	APO	150 m	MPC · JPL
278382	2007 MO_{7}	—	June 18, 2007	Kitt Peak	Spacewatch	·	1.7 km	MPC · JPL
278383	2007 MN_{16}	—	June 22, 2007	Kitt Peak	Spacewatch	·	2.7 km	MPC · JPL
278384 Mudanjiang	2007 MV_{20}	Mudanjiang	June 24, 2007	Lulin	Q. Ye, Lin, H.-C.	·	2.2 km	MPC · JPL
278385	2007 MA_{24}	—	June 24, 2007	Catalina	CSS	·	5.1 km	MPC · JPL
278386 Sofivanna	2007 NK_{2}	Sofivanna	July 13, 2007	Andrushivka	Andrushivka	JUN	1.5 km	MPC · JPL
278387	2007 OM	—	July 17, 2007	La Sagra	OAM	·	2.3 km	MPC · JPL
278388	2007 OV_{1}	—	July 18, 2007	Reedy Creek	J. Broughton	·	2.5 km	MPC · JPL
278389	2007 PZ_{9}	—	August 8, 2007	Socorro	LINEAR	·	1.4 km	MPC · JPL
278390	2007 PK_{11}	—	August 9, 2007	Kitt Peak	Spacewatch	·	2.3 km	MPC · JPL
278391	2007 PL_{14}	—	August 8, 2007	Socorro	LINEAR	V	820 m	MPC · JPL
278392	2007 PN_{25}	—	August 13, 2007	Bisei SG Center	BATTeRS	·	2.1 km	MPC · JPL
278393	2007 PS_{26}	—	August 11, 2007	Bergisch Gladbach	W. Bickel	·	1.9 km	MPC · JPL
278394	2007 PB_{30}	—	August 10, 2007	Kitt Peak	Spacewatch	·	3.7 km	MPC · JPL
278395	2007 PP_{38}	—	August 14, 2007	Siding Spring	SSS	·	1.9 km	MPC · JPL
278396	2007 PD_{47}	—	August 10, 2007	Kitt Peak	Spacewatch	EOS	2.1 km	MPC · JPL
278397	2007 QZ_{1}	—	August 18, 2007	La Sagra	OAM	·	3.3 km	MPC · JPL
278398	2007 QF_{5}	—	August 26, 2007	Wildberg	R. Apitzsch	EOS	2.3 km	MPC · JPL
278399	2007 QJ_{7}	—	August 21, 2007	Anderson Mesa	LONEOS	·	3.1 km	MPC · JPL
278400	2007 QL_{8}	—	August 21, 2007	Anderson Mesa	LONEOS	·	4.2 km	MPC · JPL

== 278401–278500 ==
back to top

Designation			Discovery			Properties		Ref
Permanent	Provisional	Named after	Date	Site	Discoverer(s)	Category	Diam.	Ref
278401	2007 QD_{10}	—	August 22, 2007	Socorro	LINEAR	·	2.0 km	MPC · JPL
278402	2007 QA_{13}	—	August 18, 2007	Mayhill	Lowe, A.	·	3.0 km	MPC · JPL
278403	2007 QT_{16}	—	August 21, 2007	Anderson Mesa	LONEOS	·	3.1 km	MPC · JPL
278404	2007 QH_{17}	—	August 23, 2007	Kitt Peak	Spacewatch	·	2.9 km	MPC · JPL
278405	2007 RA_{6}	—	September 5, 2007	Dauban	Chante-Perdrix	·	970 m	MPC · JPL
278406	2007 RV_{6}	—	September 6, 2007	Pla D'Arguines	R. Ferrando	·	3.7 km	MPC · JPL
278407	2007 RC_{7}	—	September 6, 2007	Dauban	Chante-Perdrix	LIX	4.4 km	MPC · JPL
278408	2007 RC_{22}	—	September 3, 2007	Catalina	CSS	EOS	2.7 km	MPC · JPL
278409	2007 RJ_{33}	—	September 5, 2007	Catalina	CSS	·	3.9 km	MPC · JPL
278410	2007 RV_{38}	—	September 8, 2007	Anderson Mesa	LONEOS	·	6.5 km	MPC · JPL
278411	2007 RX_{42}	—	September 9, 2007	Kitt Peak	Spacewatch	(6355)	4.8 km	MPC · JPL
278412	2007 RQ_{46}	—	September 9, 2007	Kitt Peak	Spacewatch	HOF	3.9 km	MPC · JPL
278413	2007 RH_{48}	—	September 9, 2007	Mount Lemmon	Mount Lemmon Survey	THM	2.8 km	MPC · JPL
278414	2007 RG_{56}	—	September 9, 2007	Kitt Peak	Spacewatch	·	3.7 km	MPC · JPL
278415	2007 RF_{103}	—	September 11, 2007	Catalina	CSS	·	3.8 km	MPC · JPL
278416	2007 RP_{134}	—	September 12, 2007	Catalina	CSS	·	3.7 km	MPC · JPL
278417 Kerschbaum	2007 RR_{146}	Kerschbaum	September 14, 2007	Taunus	E. Schwab, R. Kling	EOS	2.3 km	MPC · JPL
278418	2007 RA_{155}	—	September 10, 2007	Mount Lemmon	Mount Lemmon Survey	·	3.2 km	MPC · JPL
278419	2007 RH_{157}	—	September 11, 2007	Mount Lemmon	Mount Lemmon Survey	KOR	1.5 km	MPC · JPL
278420	2007 RY_{167}	—	September 10, 2007	Kitt Peak	Spacewatch	EOS	2.5 km	MPC · JPL
278421	2007 RA_{205}	—	September 9, 2007	Kitt Peak	Spacewatch	·	3.6 km	MPC · JPL
278422	2007 RT_{208}	—	September 10, 2007	Kitt Peak	Spacewatch	EOS	2.5 km	MPC · JPL
278423	2007 RP_{210}	—	September 11, 2007	Kitt Peak	Spacewatch	·	1.8 km	MPC · JPL
278424	2007 RH_{217}	—	September 13, 2007	Mount Lemmon	Mount Lemmon Survey	·	2.7 km	MPC · JPL
278425	2007 RY_{218}	—	September 14, 2007	Mount Lemmon	Mount Lemmon Survey	·	3.2 km	MPC · JPL
278426	2007 RQ_{228}	—	September 11, 2007	Mount Lemmon	Mount Lemmon Survey	·	3.9 km	MPC · JPL
278427	2007 RD_{239}	—	September 14, 2007	Catalina	CSS	·	4.3 km	MPC · JPL
278428	2007 RW_{257}	—	September 14, 2007	Mount Lemmon	Mount Lemmon Survey	·	5.0 km	MPC · JPL
278429	2007 RG_{266}	—	September 15, 2007	Anderson Mesa	LONEOS	·	4.4 km	MPC · JPL
278430	2007 RC_{270}	—	September 15, 2007	Mount Lemmon	Mount Lemmon Survey	·	3.9 km	MPC · JPL
278431	2007 RD_{271}	—	September 15, 2007	Kitt Peak	Spacewatch	·	3.4 km	MPC · JPL
278432	2007 RS_{275}	—	September 9, 2007	Siding Spring	SSS	TIN	1.7 km	MPC · JPL
278433	2007 RT_{275}	—	September 9, 2007	Siding Spring	SSS	TIN	2.8 km	MPC · JPL
278434	2007 RU_{275}	—	September 9, 2007	Siding Spring	SSS	T_{j} (2.99) · EUP	5.9 km	MPC · JPL
278435	2007 RT_{281}	—	September 14, 2007	Catalina	CSS	EOS	3.0 km	MPC · JPL
278436	2007 RQ_{283}	—	September 13, 2007	Kitt Peak	Spacewatch	THM	2.6 km	MPC · JPL
278437	2007 RT_{284}	—	September 12, 2007	Anderson Mesa	LONEOS	THM	3.2 km	MPC · JPL
278438	2007 RS_{286}	—	September 4, 2007	Mount Lemmon	Mount Lemmon Survey	·	3.4 km	MPC · JPL
278439	2007 RU_{286}	—	September 4, 2007	Mount Lemmon	Mount Lemmon Survey	(31811)	3.3 km	MPC · JPL
278440	2007 RF_{308}	—	September 11, 2007	Kitt Peak	Spacewatch	·	3.4 km	MPC · JPL
278441	2007 RJ_{312}	—	September 12, 2007	Catalina	CSS	·	4.2 km	MPC · JPL
278442	2007 RJ_{323}	—	September 15, 2007	Kitt Peak	Spacewatch	·	1.8 km	MPC · JPL
278443	2007 SG_{1}	—	September 18, 2007	Dauban	Chante-Perdrix	·	3.5 km	MPC · JPL
278444	2007 SJ_{4}	—	September 16, 2007	Tiki	Teamo, N.	DOR	2.9 km	MPC · JPL
278445	2007 SL_{12}	—	September 18, 2007	Anderson Mesa	LONEOS	EOS	2.8 km	MPC · JPL
278446	2007 SA_{16}	—	September 30, 2007	Kitt Peak	Spacewatch	CYB	5.5 km	MPC · JPL
278447 Saviano	2007 TH	Saviano	October 2, 2007	Vallemare Borbona	V. S. Casulli	CYB	5.0 km	MPC · JPL
278448	2007 TX_{2}	—	October 3, 2007	7300	W. K. Y. Yeung	·	3.6 km	MPC · JPL
278449	2007 TS_{5}	—	October 6, 2007	Socorro	LINEAR	H	550 m	MPC · JPL
278450	2007 TR_{6}	—	October 6, 2007	La Sagra	OAM	TIR	5.2 km	MPC · JPL
278451	2007 TO_{22}	—	October 9, 2007	Goodricke-Pigott	R. A. Tucker	·	6.2 km	MPC · JPL
278452	2007 TD_{31}	—	October 4, 2007	Kitt Peak	Spacewatch	·	3.8 km	MPC · JPL
278453	2007 TY_{31}	—	October 5, 2007	Purple Mountain	PMO NEO Survey Program	·	4.1 km	MPC · JPL
278454	2007 TN_{84}	—	October 8, 2007	Catalina	CSS	·	840 m	MPC · JPL
278455	2007 TV_{85}	—	October 8, 2007	Mount Lemmon	Mount Lemmon Survey	·	2.5 km	MPC · JPL
278456	2007 TH_{94}	—	October 7, 2007	Catalina	CSS	HYG	3.5 km	MPC · JPL
278457	2007 TO_{110}	—	October 8, 2007	Catalina	CSS	·	4.2 km	MPC · JPL
278458	2007 TA_{111}	—	October 8, 2007	Catalina	CSS	·	3.3 km	MPC · JPL
278459	2007 TF_{125}	—	October 6, 2007	Kitt Peak	Spacewatch	·	4.6 km	MPC · JPL
278460	2007 TG_{129}	—	October 6, 2007	Kitt Peak	Spacewatch	·	5.7 km	MPC · JPL
278461	2007 TJ_{139}	—	October 9, 2007	Kitt Peak	Spacewatch	·	4.9 km	MPC · JPL
278462	2007 TD_{160}	—	October 9, 2007	Socorro	LINEAR	·	1.8 km	MPC · JPL
278463	2007 TJ_{161}	—	October 11, 2007	Socorro	LINEAR	·	3.6 km	MPC · JPL
278464	2007 TB_{164}	—	October 11, 2007	Socorro	LINEAR	NYS	1.1 km	MPC · JPL
278465	2007 TQ_{166}	—	October 12, 2007	Socorro	LINEAR	TIN	1.2 km	MPC · JPL
278466	2007 TS_{168}	—	October 12, 2007	Socorro	LINEAR	ADE	3.9 km	MPC · JPL
278467	2007 TE_{190}	—	October 4, 2007	Mount Lemmon	Mount Lemmon Survey	·	3.5 km	MPC · JPL
278468	2007 TP_{208}	—	October 10, 2007	Catalina	CSS	·	7.4 km	MPC · JPL
278469	2007 TA_{225}	—	October 11, 2007	Catalina	CSS	·	4.4 km	MPC · JPL
278470	2007 TN_{225}	—	October 5, 2007	Kitt Peak	Spacewatch	·	2.1 km	MPC · JPL
278471	2007 TF_{242}	—	October 8, 2007	Catalina	CSS	·	2.5 km	MPC · JPL
278472	2007 TX_{251}	—	October 12, 2007	Anderson Mesa	LONEOS	·	4.5 km	MPC · JPL
278473	2007 TS_{269}	—	October 9, 2007	Kitt Peak	Spacewatch	·	4.0 km	MPC · JPL
278474	2007 TS_{287}	—	October 11, 2007	Catalina	CSS	·	1.4 km	MPC · JPL
278475	2007 TF_{379}	—	October 13, 2007	Catalina	CSS	LUT	4.7 km	MPC · JPL
278476	2007 TT_{405}	—	October 15, 2007	Kitt Peak	Spacewatch	JUN	1.6 km	MPC · JPL
278477	2007 TC_{413}	—	October 15, 2007	Anderson Mesa	LONEOS	·	3.9 km	MPC · JPL
278478	2007 TQ_{434}	—	October 10, 2007	Catalina	CSS	LIX	4.0 km	MPC · JPL
278479	2007 TG_{451}	—	October 15, 2007	Mount Lemmon	Mount Lemmon Survey	URS	4.4 km	MPC · JPL
278480	2007 UU	—	October 17, 2007	Mayhill	Lowe, A.	T_{j} (2.99) · EUP	6.6 km	MPC · JPL
278481	2007 UK_{37}	—	October 19, 2007	Catalina	CSS	·	4.0 km	MPC · JPL
278482	2007 UF_{53}	—	June 21, 2006	Catalina	CSS	·	4.2 km	MPC · JPL
278483	2007 UA_{68}	—	October 30, 2007	Catalina	CSS	·	2.0 km	MPC · JPL
278484	2007 UT_{84}	—	October 30, 2007	Kitt Peak	Spacewatch	·	1.1 km	MPC · JPL
278485	2007 UV_{95}	—	October 30, 2007	Mount Lemmon	Mount Lemmon Survey	·	4.6 km	MPC · JPL
278486	2007 UR_{136}	—	October 19, 2007	Catalina	CSS	·	4.5 km	MPC · JPL
278487	2007 VX_{65}	—	November 2, 2007	Mount Lemmon	Mount Lemmon Survey	·	3.5 km	MPC · JPL
278488	2007 VW_{73}	—	November 3, 2007	Kitt Peak	Spacewatch	·	3.3 km	MPC · JPL
278489	2007 VU_{88}	—	November 3, 2007	Socorro	LINEAR	·	4.3 km	MPC · JPL
278490	2007 VL_{118}	—	November 4, 2007	Mount Lemmon	Mount Lemmon Survey	VER	4.8 km	MPC · JPL
278491	2007 VQ_{148}	—	November 5, 2007	Purple Mountain	PMO NEO Survey Program	·	770 m	MPC · JPL
278492	2007 VA_{238}	—	November 12, 2007	Catalina	CSS	·	1.1 km	MPC · JPL
278493	2007 VZ_{251}	—	November 12, 2007	Mount Lemmon	Mount Lemmon Survey	·	3.5 km	MPC · JPL
278494	2007 VT_{252}	—	November 13, 2007	Mount Lemmon	Mount Lemmon Survey	·	3.5 km	MPC · JPL
278495	2007 VK_{332}	—	November 7, 2007	Kitt Peak	Spacewatch	·	5.3 km	MPC · JPL
278496	2007 WV_{8}	—	November 18, 2007	Socorro	LINEAR	·	3.2 km	MPC · JPL
278497	2007 WV_{20}	—	November 18, 2007	Mount Lemmon	Mount Lemmon Survey	·	1.8 km	MPC · JPL
278498	2007 XW_{57}	—	December 5, 2007	Kitt Peak	Spacewatch	·	970 m	MPC · JPL
278499	2007 YC_{11}	—	December 17, 2007	Kitt Peak	Spacewatch	·	860 m	MPC · JPL
278500	2007 YV_{54}	—	December 31, 2007	Catalina	CSS	PHO	2.8 km	MPC · JPL

== 278501–278600 ==
back to top

Designation			Discovery			Properties		Ref
Permanent	Provisional	Named after	Date	Site	Discoverer(s)	Category	Diam.	Ref
278501	2007 YA_{56}	—	December 30, 2007	Catalina	CSS	·	1.6 km	MPC · JPL
278502	2008 AP_{1}	—	January 6, 2008	La Sagra	OAM	H	750 m	MPC · JPL
278503	2008 AN_{47}	—	January 11, 2008	Kitt Peak	Spacewatch	·	2.0 km	MPC · JPL
278504	2008 AO_{74}	—	January 11, 2008	Catalina	CSS	·	1.6 km	MPC · JPL
278505	2008 AS_{132}	—	September 17, 1995	Kitt Peak	Spacewatch	MAS	930 m	MPC · JPL
278506	2008 BJ_{20}	—	January 30, 2008	Catalina	CSS	·	1.5 km	MPC · JPL
278507	2008 BA_{32}	—	January 30, 2008	Mount Lemmon	Mount Lemmon Survey	MAS	910 m	MPC · JPL
278508	2008 CU_{1}	—	February 3, 2008	Bisei SG Center	BATTeRS	·	1.5 km	MPC · JPL
278509	2008 CX_{12}	—	February 3, 2008	Kitt Peak	Spacewatch	·	1.5 km	MPC · JPL
278510	2008 CT_{18}	—	February 3, 2008	Kitt Peak	Spacewatch	·	2.0 km	MPC · JPL
278511	2008 CB_{24}	—	February 1, 2008	Kitt Peak	Spacewatch	·	1.7 km	MPC · JPL
278512	2008 CL_{39}	—	February 2, 2008	Mount Lemmon	Mount Lemmon Survey	·	1.7 km	MPC · JPL
278513 Schwope	2008 CE_{120}	Schwope	February 14, 2008	Inastars	Thinius, B.	·	2.4 km	MPC · JPL
278514	2008 CG_{180}	—	February 9, 2008	Catalina	CSS	·	2.1 km	MPC · JPL
278515	2008 CV_{199}	—	February 13, 2008	Mount Lemmon	Mount Lemmon Survey	·	960 m	MPC · JPL
278516	2008 DP_{21}	—	February 28, 2008	Catalina	CSS	ADE	3.1 km	MPC · JPL
278517	2008 DU_{25}	—	February 29, 2008	Purple Mountain	PMO NEO Survey Program	·	2.1 km	MPC · JPL
278518	2008 DK_{32}	—	February 27, 2008	Kitt Peak	Spacewatch	·	2.4 km	MPC · JPL
278519	2008 DC_{33}	—	February 27, 2008	Kitt Peak	Spacewatch	EMA	3.3 km	MPC · JPL
278520	2008 DY_{34}	—	February 27, 2008	Kitt Peak	Spacewatch	AGN	1.4 km	MPC · JPL
278521	2008 DP_{36}	—	February 27, 2008	Mount Lemmon	Mount Lemmon Survey	·	2.2 km	MPC · JPL
278522	2008 DW_{46}	—	February 28, 2008	Kitt Peak	Spacewatch	·	700 m	MPC · JPL
278523	2008 DY_{46}	—	February 28, 2008	Kitt Peak	Spacewatch	·	1.1 km	MPC · JPL
278524	2008 DU_{48}	—	February 29, 2008	Catalina	CSS	MAR	1.7 km	MPC · JPL
278525	2008 DJ_{67}	—	February 29, 2008	Kitt Peak	Spacewatch	·	660 m	MPC · JPL
278526	2008 DM_{68}	—	February 29, 2008	Kitt Peak	Spacewatch	·	670 m	MPC · JPL
278527	2008 DH_{85}	—	February 18, 2008	Mount Lemmon	Mount Lemmon Survey	·	2.5 km	MPC · JPL
278528	2008 EM_{13}	—	March 1, 2008	Kitt Peak	Spacewatch	·	2.1 km	MPC · JPL
278529	2008 EM_{16}	—	March 1, 2008	Kitt Peak	Spacewatch	·	650 m	MPC · JPL
278530	2008 EY_{20}	—	March 2, 2008	Kitt Peak	Spacewatch	·	1.0 km	MPC · JPL
278531	2008 EJ_{32}	—	March 8, 2008	Grove Creek	Tozzi, F.	GEF	1.9 km	MPC · JPL
278532	2008 EC_{46}	—	March 5, 2008	Kitt Peak	Spacewatch	H	630 m	MPC · JPL
278533	2008 EP_{47}	—	March 5, 2008	Mount Lemmon	Mount Lemmon Survey	·	1.2 km	MPC · JPL
278534	2008 EZ_{69}	—	March 4, 2008	Mount Lemmon	Mount Lemmon Survey	·	3.1 km	MPC · JPL
278535	2008 EE_{72}	—	March 6, 2008	Mount Lemmon	Mount Lemmon Survey	·	3.4 km	MPC · JPL
278536	2008 EC_{74}	—	March 7, 2008	Kitt Peak	Spacewatch	·	1.2 km	MPC · JPL
278537	2008 EX_{75}	—	March 7, 2008	Kitt Peak	Spacewatch	·	2.0 km	MPC · JPL
278538	2008 EZ_{81}	—	March 4, 2008	Socorro	LINEAR	·	880 m	MPC · JPL
278539	2008 EF_{82}	—	March 8, 2008	Socorro	LINEAR	·	1.8 km	MPC · JPL
278540	2008 EX_{87}	—	March 10, 2008	Mount Lemmon	Mount Lemmon Survey	·	5.9 km	MPC · JPL
278541	2008 EA_{123}	—	March 9, 2008	Kitt Peak	Spacewatch	·	900 m	MPC · JPL
278542	2008 EB_{127}	—	March 10, 2008	Kitt Peak	Spacewatch	·	2.3 km	MPC · JPL
278543	2008 EJ_{151}	—	March 2, 2008	Kitt Peak	Spacewatch	·	800 m	MPC · JPL
278544	2008 ER_{166}	—	March 6, 2008	Mount Lemmon	Mount Lemmon Survey	·	850 m	MPC · JPL
278545	2008 EM_{167}	—	March 8, 2008	Socorro	LINEAR	fast	6.0 km	MPC · JPL
278546	2008 FW_{3}	—	March 25, 2008	Kitt Peak	Spacewatch	·	2.4 km	MPC · JPL
278547	2008 FM_{8}	—	March 25, 2008	Kitt Peak	Spacewatch	·	1.7 km	MPC · JPL
278548	2008 FX_{27}	—	March 27, 2008	Kitt Peak	Spacewatch	V	850 m	MPC · JPL
278549	2008 FC_{34}	—	March 28, 2008	Mount Lemmon	Mount Lemmon Survey	·	800 m	MPC · JPL
278550	2008 FZ_{48}	—	March 28, 2008	Mount Lemmon	Mount Lemmon Survey	MAS	890 m	MPC · JPL
278551	2008 FC_{66}	—	March 28, 2008	Mount Lemmon	Mount Lemmon Survey	·	4.5 km	MPC · JPL
278552	2008 FW_{67}	—	March 28, 2008	Kitt Peak	Spacewatch	·	4.3 km	MPC · JPL
278553	2008 FL_{96}	—	March 29, 2008	Kitt Peak	Spacewatch	·	1.2 km	MPC · JPL
278554	2008 FW_{109}	—	March 31, 2008	Mount Lemmon	Mount Lemmon Survey	NYS	1.2 km	MPC · JPL
278555	2008 FB_{123}	—	March 28, 2008	Mount Lemmon	Mount Lemmon Survey	·	1.2 km	MPC · JPL
278556	2008 FP_{137}	—	March 31, 2008	Mount Lemmon	Mount Lemmon Survey	·	740 m	MPC · JPL
278557	2008 GM_{27}	—	April 3, 2008	Kitt Peak	Spacewatch	EOS	2.3 km	MPC · JPL
278558	2008 GF_{36}	—	April 3, 2008	Kitt Peak	Spacewatch	EOS	2.5 km	MPC · JPL
278559	2008 GN_{36}	—	April 3, 2008	Kitt Peak	Spacewatch	·	2.7 km	MPC · JPL
278560	2008 GH_{47}	—	April 4, 2008	Kitt Peak	Spacewatch	RAF	1.0 km	MPC · JPL
278561	2008 GA_{74}	—	April 7, 2008	Kitt Peak	Spacewatch	·	1.2 km	MPC · JPL
278562	2008 GN_{74}	—	April 7, 2008	Kitt Peak	Spacewatch	TEL	1.4 km	MPC · JPL
278563	2008 GH_{93}	—	April 6, 2008	Catalina	CSS	GEF	1.7 km	MPC · JPL
278564	2008 GK_{97}	—	April 8, 2008	Kitt Peak	Spacewatch	·	1.0 km	MPC · JPL
278565	2008 GY_{126}	—	April 14, 2008	Mount Lemmon	Mount Lemmon Survey	V	850 m	MPC · JPL
278566	2008 GZ_{127}	—	April 14, 2008	Mount Lemmon	Mount Lemmon Survey	·	1.3 km	MPC · JPL
278567	2008 GP_{129}	—	April 3, 2008	Mount Lemmon	Mount Lemmon Survey	·	950 m	MPC · JPL
278568	2008 GY_{137}	—	April 10, 2008	Kitt Peak	Spacewatch	·	840 m	MPC · JPL
278569	2008 GW_{144}	—	April 5, 2008	Kitt Peak	Spacewatch	·	760 m	MPC · JPL
278570	2008 HT_{8}	—	April 24, 2008	Kitt Peak	Spacewatch	·	3.4 km	MPC · JPL
278571	2008 HZ_{8}	—	April 24, 2008	Kitt Peak	Spacewatch	EOS	2.6 km	MPC · JPL
278572	2008 HB_{21}	—	April 26, 2008	Kitt Peak	Spacewatch	L5	10 km	MPC · JPL
278573	2008 HF_{26}	—	April 27, 2008	Kitt Peak	Spacewatch	·	860 m	MPC · JPL
278574	2008 HW_{26}	—	April 27, 2008	Mount Lemmon	Mount Lemmon Survey	·	2.5 km	MPC · JPL
278575	2008 HV_{35}	—	April 29, 2008	Mount Lemmon	Mount Lemmon Survey	·	1.6 km	MPC · JPL
278576	2008 HS_{37}	—	April 30, 2008	La Sagra	OAM	·	750 m	MPC · JPL
278577	2008 HG_{40}	—	April 26, 2008	Mount Lemmon	Mount Lemmon Survey	·	900 m	MPC · JPL
278578	2008 HD_{62}	—	April 30, 2008	Kitt Peak	Spacewatch	·	1.6 km	MPC · JPL
278579	2008 HC_{66}	—	April 28, 2008	Reedy Creek	J. Broughton	·	2.3 km	MPC · JPL
278580	2008 JE_{5}	—	May 3, 2008	Kitt Peak	Spacewatch	·	3.3 km	MPC · JPL
278581	2008 JL_{6}	—	May 2, 2008	Kitt Peak	Spacewatch	EOS	2.1 km	MPC · JPL
278582	2008 JE_{15}	—	May 5, 2008	Vail-Jarnac	Jarnac	·	1.6 km	MPC · JPL
278583	2008 JD_{23}	—	May 7, 2008	Kitt Peak	Spacewatch	·	4.0 km	MPC · JPL
278584	2008 JQ_{27}	—	May 8, 2008	Kitt Peak	Spacewatch	·	980 m	MPC · JPL
278585	2008 KM_{26}	—	May 29, 2008	Kitt Peak	Spacewatch	·	2.5 km	MPC · JPL
278586	2008 KW_{34}	—	May 27, 2008	Kitt Peak	Spacewatch	·	1.3 km	MPC · JPL
278587	2008 KX_{42}	—	May 30, 2008	Mount Lemmon	Mount Lemmon Survey	V	740 m	MPC · JPL
278588	2008 LY_{16}	—	June 8, 2008	Cerro Burek	Burek, Cerro	V	740 m	MPC · JPL
278589	2008 NO	—	July 1, 2008	Kitt Peak	Spacewatch	·	1.8 km	MPC · JPL
278590	2008 NA_{2}	—	July 4, 2008	La Sagra	OAM	·	880 m	MPC · JPL
278591 Salò	2008 NZ_{3}	Salò	July 15, 2008	Magasa	Tonincelli, M., Stucchi, A.	V	850 m	MPC · JPL
278592	2008 NG_{5}	—	July 3, 2008	Siding Spring	SSS	·	1.3 km	MPC · JPL
278593	2008 OC	—	July 24, 2008	La Sagra	OAM	ADE	2.7 km	MPC · JPL
278594	2008 OT_{1}	—	July 26, 2008	La Sagra	OAM	·	1.0 km	MPC · JPL
278595	2008 OB_{2}	—	July 27, 2008	Skylive	Tozzi, F.	JUN	1.4 km	MPC · JPL
278596	2008 OR_{2}	—	July 27, 2008	La Sagra	OAM	·	960 m	MPC · JPL
278597	2008 OA_{21}	—	July 29, 2008	Kitt Peak	Spacewatch	·	3.1 km	MPC · JPL
278598	2008 OL_{21}	—	July 30, 2008	Kitt Peak	Spacewatch	·	2.3 km	MPC · JPL
278599	2008 OM_{23}	—	July 29, 2008	Mount Lemmon	Mount Lemmon Survey	·	1.9 km	MPC · JPL
278600	2008 OZ_{24}	—	July 28, 2008	Siding Spring	SSS	·	970 m	MPC · JPL

== 278601–278700 ==
back to top

Designation			Discovery			Properties		Ref
Permanent	Provisional	Named after	Date	Site	Discoverer(s)	Category	Diam.	Ref
278601	2008 PV_{2}	—	August 2, 2008	Reedy Creek	J. Broughton	·	2.2 km	MPC · JPL
278602	2008 PG_{6}	—	August 4, 2008	La Sagra	OAM	·	1.5 km	MPC · JPL
278603	2008 PQ_{6}	—	August 4, 2008	La Sagra	OAM	·	1.1 km	MPC · JPL
278604	2008 PV_{6}	—	August 5, 2008	Tiki	Teamo, N.	·	2.5 km	MPC · JPL
278605	2008 PZ_{7}	—	August 5, 2008	La Sagra	OAM	(2076)	820 m	MPC · JPL
278606	2008 PU_{9}	—	August 7, 2008	Hibiscus	S. F. Hönig, Teamo, N.	·	1.2 km	MPC · JPL
278607	2008 PS_{11}	—	August 9, 2008	Reedy Creek	J. Broughton	·	3.8 km	MPC · JPL
278608	2008 PZ_{15}	—	August 8, 2008	Reedy Creek	J. Broughton	·	1.8 km	MPC · JPL
278609 Avrudenko	2008 PP_{17}	Avrudenko	August 5, 2008	Andrushivka	Andrushivka	·	690 m	MPC · JPL
278610	2008 PW_{19}	—	August 7, 2008	Kitt Peak	Spacewatch	·	4.0 km	MPC · JPL
278611	2008 QC_{5}	—	August 22, 2008	Kitt Peak	Spacewatch	·	1.2 km	MPC · JPL
278612	2008 QL_{5}	—	August 22, 2008	Kitt Peak	Spacewatch	·	4.3 km	MPC · JPL
278613	2008 QV_{5}	—	August 24, 2008	La Sagra	OAM	·	3.3 km	MPC · JPL
278614	2008 QC_{8}	—	August 25, 2008	La Sagra	OAM	·	780 m	MPC · JPL
278615	2008 QP_{8}	—	August 25, 2008	La Sagra	OAM	·	1.6 km	MPC · JPL
278616	2008 QQ_{9}	—	August 25, 2008	La Sagra	OAM	·	2.9 km	MPC · JPL
278617	2008 QV_{10}	—	August 26, 2008	La Sagra	OAM	·	3.9 km	MPC · JPL
278618	2008 QN_{12}	—	August 26, 2008	La Sagra	OAM	·	1.4 km	MPC · JPL
278619	2008 QB_{16}	—	August 21, 2008	Kitt Peak	Spacewatch	·	970 m	MPC · JPL
278620	2008 QM_{20}	—	August 31, 2008	Great Shefford	Birtwhistle, P.	·	3.9 km	MPC · JPL
278621	2008 QU_{22}	—	August 26, 2008	Socorro	LINEAR	·	3.8 km	MPC · JPL
278622	2008 QC_{25}	—	August 31, 2008	Tiki	Teamo, N.	·	2.5 km	MPC · JPL
278623	2008 QP_{28}	—	August 31, 2008	La Sagra	OAM	NYS	1.4 km	MPC · JPL
278624	2008 QX_{30}	—	August 30, 2008	Socorro	LINEAR	·	1.6 km	MPC · JPL
278625	2008 QC_{40}	—	August 27, 2008	Parc National des Cévennes	C. Demeautis, J.-M. Lopez	·	1.8 km	MPC · JPL
278626	2008 QK_{40}	—	August 31, 2008	Moletai	Molėtai	PAD	2.2 km	MPC · JPL
278627	2008 QW_{40}	—	August 24, 2008	Kitt Peak	Spacewatch	·	2.0 km	MPC · JPL
278628	2008 QZ_{40}	—	August 20, 2008	Kitt Peak	Spacewatch	·	1.2 km	MPC · JPL
278629	2008 QH_{43}	—	August 21, 2008	Kitt Peak	Spacewatch	·	1.9 km	MPC · JPL
278630	2008 QV_{44}	—	August 24, 2008	Socorro	LINEAR	·	4.4 km	MPC · JPL
278631	2008 QR_{45}	—	August 23, 2008	Socorro	LINEAR	·	1.7 km	MPC · JPL
278632	2008 QO_{47}	—	August 23, 2008	Kitt Peak	Spacewatch	WIT	1.3 km	MPC · JPL
278633	2008 QU_{47}	—	August 23, 2008	Kitt Peak	Spacewatch	·	4.0 km	MPC · JPL
278634	2008 RJ	—	September 1, 2008	Hibiscus	S. F. Hönig, Teamo, N.	ADE	3.6 km	MPC · JPL
278635	2008 RQ_{1}	—	September 3, 2008	Kachina	Hobart, J.	·	1.5 km	MPC · JPL
278636	2008 RX_{1}	—	September 2, 2008	Kitt Peak	Spacewatch	·	2.5 km	MPC · JPL
278637	2008 RF_{2}	—	September 2, 2008	Kitt Peak	Spacewatch	·	2.3 km	MPC · JPL
278638	2008 RD_{3}	—	September 2, 2008	Kitt Peak	Spacewatch	·	1.9 km	MPC · JPL
278639	2008 RG_{5}	—	September 2, 2008	Kitt Peak	Spacewatch	·	2.7 km	MPC · JPL
278640 Elenačernienė	2008 RZ_{5}	Elenačernienė	September 2, 2008	Moletai	K. Černis, E. Černis	EOS	2.3 km	MPC · JPL
278641	2008 RF_{17}	—	September 4, 2008	Kitt Peak	Spacewatch	·	2.4 km	MPC · JPL
278642	2008 RH_{17}	—	September 4, 2008	Kitt Peak	Spacewatch	·	3.7 km	MPC · JPL
278643	2008 RL_{19}	—	September 4, 2008	Kitt Peak	Spacewatch	·	1.9 km	MPC · JPL
278644	2008 RK_{21}	—	September 4, 2008	Kitt Peak	Spacewatch	ERI	1.4 km	MPC · JPL
278645 Kontsevych	2008 RQ_{22}	Kontsevych	September 4, 2008	Andrushivka	Andrushivka	·	1.6 km	MPC · JPL
278646	2008 RH_{24}	—	September 5, 2008	Socorro	LINEAR	·	2.1 km	MPC · JPL
278647	2008 RN_{36}	—	September 2, 2008	Kitt Peak	Spacewatch	KOR	1.4 km	MPC · JPL
278648	2008 RY_{37}	—	September 2, 2008	Kitt Peak	Spacewatch	·	1.4 km	MPC · JPL
278649	2008 RE_{40}	—	September 2, 2008	Kitt Peak	Spacewatch	·	3.0 km	MPC · JPL
278650	2008 RX_{41}	—	September 2, 2008	Kitt Peak	Spacewatch	KOR	1.6 km	MPC · JPL
278651	2008 RY_{41}	—	September 2, 2008	Kitt Peak	Spacewatch	·	2.0 km	MPC · JPL
278652	2008 RV_{42}	—	September 2, 2008	Kitt Peak	Spacewatch	·	1.7 km	MPC · JPL
278653	2008 RL_{44}	—	September 2, 2008	Kitt Peak	Spacewatch	·	1.9 km	MPC · JPL
278654	2008 RS_{44}	—	September 2, 2008	Kitt Peak	Spacewatch	AGN	1.4 km	MPC · JPL
278655	2008 RD_{45}	—	September 2, 2008	Kitt Peak	Spacewatch	EOS	1.8 km	MPC · JPL
278656	2008 RR_{46}	—	September 2, 2008	Kitt Peak	Spacewatch	KOR	1.6 km	MPC · JPL
278657	2008 RX_{53}	—	September 3, 2008	Kitt Peak	Spacewatch	PAD	2.1 km	MPC · JPL
278658	2008 RC_{54}	—	September 3, 2008	Kitt Peak	Spacewatch	EOS	2.4 km	MPC · JPL
278659	2008 RT_{64}	—	September 4, 2008	Kitt Peak	Spacewatch	·	1.7 km	MPC · JPL
278660	2008 RY_{65}	—	September 4, 2008	Kitt Peak	Spacewatch	·	910 m	MPC · JPL
278661	2008 RO_{68}	—	September 4, 2008	Kitt Peak	Spacewatch	·	1.9 km	MPC · JPL
278662	2008 RU_{68}	—	September 4, 2008	Kitt Peak	Spacewatch	·	4.4 km	MPC · JPL
278663	2008 RV_{68}	—	September 4, 2008	Kitt Peak	Spacewatch	NYS	1.5 km	MPC · JPL
278664	2008 RU_{71}	—	September 6, 2008	Catalina	CSS	·	1.4 km	MPC · JPL
278665	2008 RV_{78}	—	September 9, 2008	Bergisch Gladbach	W. Bickel	·	3.2 km	MPC · JPL
278666	2008 RX_{79}	—	September 5, 2008	Kitt Peak	Spacewatch	EOS	2.4 km	MPC · JPL
278667	2008 RM_{86}	—	September 5, 2008	Kitt Peak	Spacewatch	DOR	1.9 km	MPC · JPL
278668	2008 RS_{87}	—	September 5, 2008	Kitt Peak	Spacewatch	T_{j} (2.97) · 3:2	7.1 km	MPC · JPL
278669	2008 RG_{91}	—	September 6, 2008	Mount Lemmon	Mount Lemmon Survey	·	1.9 km	MPC · JPL
278670	2008 RN_{91}	—	September 6, 2008	Kitt Peak	Spacewatch	·	1.8 km	MPC · JPL
278671	2008 RN_{93}	—	September 6, 2008	Kitt Peak	Spacewatch	·	1.5 km	MPC · JPL
278672	2008 RO_{93}	—	September 6, 2008	Kitt Peak	Spacewatch	·	1.8 km	MPC · JPL
278673	2008 RZ_{93}	—	September 6, 2008	Kitt Peak	Spacewatch	·	2.6 km	MPC · JPL
278674	2008 RA_{94}	—	September 6, 2008	Kitt Peak	Spacewatch	·	1.6 km	MPC · JPL
278675	2008 RT_{95}	—	September 7, 2008	Catalina	CSS	PHO	840 m	MPC · JPL
278676	2008 RU_{96}	—	September 7, 2008	Mount Lemmon	Mount Lemmon Survey	TEL ·	3.5 km	MPC · JPL
278677	2008 RG_{100}	—	September 2, 2008	Kitt Peak	Spacewatch	·	1.8 km	MPC · JPL
278678	2008 RQ_{100}	—	September 4, 2008	Kitt Peak	Spacewatch	(12739)	2.4 km	MPC · JPL
278679	2008 RY_{105}	—	September 6, 2008	Mount Lemmon	Mount Lemmon Survey	·	2.3 km	MPC · JPL
278680	2008 RU_{106}	—	September 7, 2008	Mount Lemmon	Mount Lemmon Survey	·	2.6 km	MPC · JPL
278681	2008 RW_{106}	—	September 7, 2008	Catalina	CSS	TIR	4.2 km	MPC · JPL
278682	2008 RP_{107}	—	September 8, 2008	Kitt Peak	Spacewatch	·	1.8 km	MPC · JPL
278683	2008 RX_{109}	—	September 3, 2008	Kitt Peak	Spacewatch	·	1.5 km	MPC · JPL
278684	2008 RQ_{111}	—	September 4, 2008	Kitt Peak	Spacewatch	·	1.8 km	MPC · JPL
278685	2008 RL_{115}	—	September 7, 2008	Mount Lemmon	Mount Lemmon Survey	·	2.0 km	MPC · JPL
278686	2008 RN_{115}	—	September 7, 2008	Mount Lemmon	Mount Lemmon Survey	KOR	1.5 km	MPC · JPL
278687	2008 RG_{116}	—	September 7, 2008	Catalina	CSS	·	1.4 km	MPC · JPL
278688	2008 RL_{117}	—	September 9, 2008	Mount Lemmon	Mount Lemmon Survey	·	2.4 km	MPC · JPL
278689	2008 RU_{117}	—	September 9, 2008	Kitt Peak	Spacewatch	·	2.9 km	MPC · JPL
278690 Rockenbauer	2008 RZ_{118}	Rockenbauer	September 12, 2008	Piszkéstető	K. Sárneczky	·	1.2 km	MPC · JPL
278691	2008 RL_{120}	—	September 6, 2008	Kitt Peak	Spacewatch	·	4.5 km	MPC · JPL
278692	2008 RS_{120}	—	September 5, 2008	La Sagra	OAM	·	2.3 km	MPC · JPL
278693	2008 RV_{128}	—	September 2, 2008	Kitt Peak	Spacewatch	·	2.1 km	MPC · JPL
278694	2008 RO_{130}	—	September 6, 2008	Siding Spring	SSS	·	2.4 km	MPC · JPL
278695	2008 RQ_{130}	—	September 7, 2008	Mount Lemmon	Mount Lemmon Survey	·	2.2 km	MPC · JPL
278696	2008 RX_{131}	—	September 4, 2008	La Sagra	OAM	·	4.9 km	MPC · JPL
278697	2008 RG_{136}	—	September 4, 2008	Socorro	LINEAR	·	2.9 km	MPC · JPL
278698	2008 RH_{139}	—	September 7, 2008	Socorro	LINEAR	·	2.6 km	MPC · JPL
278699	2008 RP_{139}	—	September 7, 2008	Mount Lemmon	Mount Lemmon Survey	·	4.1 km	MPC · JPL
278700	2008 RB_{140}	—	September 7, 2008	Mount Lemmon	Mount Lemmon Survey	KON	3.5 km	MPC · JPL

== 278701–278800 ==
back to top

Designation			Discovery			Properties		Ref
Permanent	Provisional	Named after	Date	Site	Discoverer(s)	Category	Diam.	Ref
278701	2008 RK_{141}	—	September 4, 2008	Socorro	LINEAR	WIT	1.3 km	MPC · JPL
278702	2008 RH_{143}	—	September 3, 2008	Kitt Peak	Spacewatch	NYS	1.3 km	MPC · JPL
278703	2008 RP_{143}	—	September 6, 2008	Kitt Peak	Spacewatch	MAS	690 m	MPC · JPL
278704	2008 SR_{3}	—	September 22, 2008	Socorro	LINEAR	·	2.2 km	MPC · JPL
278705	2008 SV_{17}	—	September 19, 2008	Kitt Peak	Spacewatch	·	1.9 km	MPC · JPL
278706	2008 SF_{21}	—	September 19, 2008	Kitt Peak	Spacewatch	AGN	1.6 km	MPC · JPL
278707	2008 SX_{26}	—	September 19, 2008	Kitt Peak	Spacewatch	KOR	1.6 km	MPC · JPL
278708	2008 SQ_{27}	—	September 19, 2008	Kitt Peak	Spacewatch	·	2.8 km	MPC · JPL
278709	2008 SK_{30}	—	September 20, 2008	Catalina	CSS	EUN	1.5 km	MPC · JPL
278710	2008 SQ_{30}	—	September 20, 2008	Kitt Peak	Spacewatch	·	3.3 km	MPC · JPL
278711	2008 SC_{32}	—	September 20, 2008	Kitt Peak	Spacewatch	·	1.4 km	MPC · JPL
278712	2008 SE_{36}	—	September 20, 2008	Kitt Peak	Spacewatch	·	1.5 km	MPC · JPL
278713	2008 SY_{38}	—	September 20, 2008	Kitt Peak	Spacewatch	·	3.7 km	MPC · JPL
278714	2008 SE_{39}	—	September 20, 2008	Kitt Peak	Spacewatch	·	1.7 km	MPC · JPL
278715	2008 SR_{39}	—	September 20, 2008	Kitt Peak	Spacewatch	·	2.2 km	MPC · JPL
278716	2008 SX_{39}	—	September 20, 2008	Kitt Peak	Spacewatch	·	1.1 km	MPC · JPL
278717	2008 SO_{44}	—	September 20, 2008	Kitt Peak	Spacewatch	(21885)	3.1 km	MPC · JPL
278718	2008 SO_{46}	—	September 20, 2008	Kitt Peak	Spacewatch	·	1.3 km	MPC · JPL
278719	2008 SB_{50}	—	September 20, 2008	Mount Lemmon	Mount Lemmon Survey	MAR	1.0 km	MPC · JPL
278720	2008 SS_{55}	—	September 20, 2008	Mount Lemmon	Mount Lemmon Survey	·	3.1 km	MPC · JPL
278721	2008 SV_{55}	—	September 20, 2008	Kitt Peak	Spacewatch	·	2.7 km	MPC · JPL
278722	2008 SJ_{61}	—	September 21, 2008	Kitt Peak	Spacewatch	NYS	1.3 km	MPC · JPL
278723	2008 SX_{61}	—	September 21, 2008	Kitt Peak	Spacewatch	·	1.5 km	MPC · JPL
278724	2008 SZ_{61}	—	September 21, 2008	Kitt Peak	Spacewatch	·	1.3 km	MPC · JPL
278725	2008 SN_{64}	—	September 21, 2008	Catalina	CSS	·	3.0 km	MPC · JPL
278726	2008 SF_{65}	—	September 21, 2008	Catalina	CSS	·	5.3 km	MPC · JPL
278727	2008 SV_{67}	—	September 21, 2008	Catalina	CSS	·	2.3 km	MPC · JPL
278728	2008 SO_{68}	—	September 21, 2008	Catalina	CSS	NEM	2.8 km	MPC · JPL
278729	2008 SJ_{70}	—	September 22, 2008	Kitt Peak	Spacewatch	·	1.9 km	MPC · JPL
278730	2008 SZ_{70}	—	September 22, 2008	Kitt Peak	Spacewatch	WIT	1.3 km	MPC · JPL
278731	2008 SG_{71}	—	September 22, 2008	Mount Lemmon	Mount Lemmon Survey	·	1.8 km	MPC · JPL
278732	2008 SJ_{71}	—	September 22, 2008	Kitt Peak	Spacewatch	·	5.1 km	MPC · JPL
278733	2008 SR_{72}	—	September 22, 2008	Kitt Peak	Spacewatch	·	2.3 km	MPC · JPL
278734	2008 SN_{82}	—	September 23, 2008	Wrightwood	J. W. Young	·	1.9 km	MPC · JPL
278735 Kamioka	2008 SG_{83}	Kamioka	September 27, 2008	Vallemare Borbona	V. S. Casulli	·	2.8 km	MPC · JPL
278736	2008 SX_{84}	—	September 28, 2008	Wrightwood	J. W. Young	·	2.0 km	MPC · JPL
278737	2008 SR_{86}	—	September 20, 2008	Kitt Peak	Spacewatch	·	3.4 km	MPC · JPL
278738	2008 SA_{87}	—	September 20, 2008	Kitt Peak	Spacewatch	·	1.9 km	MPC · JPL
278739	2008 SD_{91}	—	September 21, 2008	Kitt Peak	Spacewatch	·	1.3 km	MPC · JPL
278740	2008 SP_{92}	—	September 21, 2008	Kitt Peak	Spacewatch	·	2.0 km	MPC · JPL
278741	2008 SM_{94}	—	September 21, 2008	Mount Lemmon	Mount Lemmon Survey	AGN	1.4 km	MPC · JPL
278742	2008 ST_{94}	—	September 21, 2008	Kitt Peak	Spacewatch	·	4.3 km	MPC · JPL
278743	2008 SW_{95}	—	September 21, 2008	Kitt Peak	Spacewatch	·	2.4 km	MPC · JPL
278744	2008 SX_{95}	—	September 21, 2008	Kitt Peak	Spacewatch	·	2.2 km	MPC · JPL
278745	2008 SL_{96}	—	September 21, 2008	Kitt Peak	Spacewatch	·	2.5 km	MPC · JPL
278746	2008 SZ_{98}	—	September 21, 2008	Kitt Peak	Spacewatch	(31811)	3.5 km	MPC · JPL
278747	2008 SS_{100}	—	September 21, 2008	Kitt Peak	Spacewatch	·	1.4 km	MPC · JPL
278748	2008 SP_{101}	—	September 21, 2008	Kitt Peak	Spacewatch	AGN	1.4 km	MPC · JPL
278749	2008 SJ_{102}	—	September 21, 2008	Kitt Peak	Spacewatch	·	1.6 km	MPC · JPL
278750	2008 SM_{103}	—	September 21, 2008	Mount Lemmon	Mount Lemmon Survey	WIT	1.3 km	MPC · JPL
278751	2008 SH_{106}	—	September 21, 2008	Kitt Peak	Spacewatch	·	1.8 km	MPC · JPL
278752	2008 SU_{107}	—	September 22, 2008	Kitt Peak	Spacewatch	GEF	1.4 km	MPC · JPL
278753	2008 SB_{108}	—	September 22, 2008	Mount Lemmon	Mount Lemmon Survey	·	3.4 km	MPC · JPL
278754	2008 SG_{108}	—	September 22, 2008	Mount Lemmon	Mount Lemmon Survey	·	1.9 km	MPC · JPL
278755	2008 SG_{111}	—	September 22, 2008	Kitt Peak	Spacewatch	·	2.6 km	MPC · JPL
278756	2008 SP_{117}	—	September 22, 2008	Mount Lemmon	Mount Lemmon Survey	·	1.4 km	MPC · JPL
278757	2008 SJ_{120}	—	September 22, 2008	Mount Lemmon	Mount Lemmon Survey	EOS	2.1 km	MPC · JPL
278758	2008 SC_{122}	—	September 22, 2008	Mount Lemmon	Mount Lemmon Survey	AGN	1.4 km	MPC · JPL
278759	2008 SL_{122}	—	September 22, 2008	Mount Lemmon	Mount Lemmon Survey	·	1.5 km	MPC · JPL
278760	2008 SN_{125}	—	September 22, 2008	Mount Lemmon	Mount Lemmon Survey	KOR	1.7 km	MPC · JPL
278761	2008 SY_{126}	—	September 22, 2008	Kitt Peak	Spacewatch	·	2.6 km	MPC · JPL
278762	2008 SV_{136}	—	September 23, 2008	Kitt Peak	Spacewatch	·	3.2 km	MPC · JPL
278763	2008 SD_{138}	—	September 23, 2008	Kitt Peak	Spacewatch	·	2.1 km	MPC · JPL
278764	2008 SY_{138}	—	September 23, 2008	Kitt Peak	Spacewatch	HOF	3.0 km	MPC · JPL
278765	2008 SW_{143}	—	September 24, 2008	Mount Lemmon	Mount Lemmon Survey	·	1.7 km	MPC · JPL
278766	2008 SY_{143}	—	September 24, 2008	Mount Lemmon	Mount Lemmon Survey	·	2.2 km	MPC · JPL
278767	2008 SJ_{149}	—	October 7, 2002	Kitt Peak	Spacewatch	·	3.9 km	MPC · JPL
278768	2008 SY_{149}	—	September 29, 2008	Dauban	Kugel, F.	·	2.6 km	MPC · JPL
278769	2008 SR_{153}	—	September 22, 2008	Socorro	LINEAR	·	2.6 km	MPC · JPL
278770	2008 SS_{154}	—	September 22, 2008	Socorro	LINEAR	MAS	1.0 km	MPC · JPL
278771	2008 SD_{155}	—	September 23, 2008	Socorro	LINEAR	KOR	2.1 km	MPC · JPL
278772	2008 SL_{156}	—	September 23, 2008	Socorro	LINEAR	KOR	1.8 km	MPC · JPL
278773	2008 SN_{156}	—	September 23, 2008	Socorro	LINEAR	·	2.3 km	MPC · JPL
278774	2008 SP_{156}	—	September 24, 2008	Socorro	LINEAR	·	3.6 km	MPC · JPL
278775	2008 SA_{157}	—	September 3, 2008	Kitt Peak	Spacewatch	·	2.0 km	MPC · JPL
278776	2008 SR_{158}	—	September 24, 2008	Socorro	LINEAR	·	940 m	MPC · JPL
278777	2008 SQ_{161}	—	September 28, 2008	Socorro	LINEAR	NEM	2.4 km	MPC · JPL
278778	2008 SX_{163}	—	September 28, 2008	Socorro	LINEAR	THM	3.2 km	MPC · JPL
278779	2008 SC_{164}	—	September 28, 2008	Socorro	LINEAR	·	1.7 km	MPC · JPL
278780	2008 SN_{171}	—	September 21, 2008	Mount Lemmon	Mount Lemmon Survey	·	3.9 km	MPC · JPL
278781	2008 SD_{176}	—	September 23, 2008	Kitt Peak	Spacewatch	·	3.0 km	MPC · JPL
278782	2008 SY_{182}	—	September 24, 2008	Mount Lemmon	Mount Lemmon Survey	·	1.9 km	MPC · JPL
278783	2008 SS_{183}	—	September 24, 2008	Kitt Peak	Spacewatch	KOR	1.6 km	MPC · JPL
278784	2008 SM_{184}	—	September 24, 2008	Mount Lemmon	Mount Lemmon Survey	·	5.2 km	MPC · JPL
278785	2008 SU_{186}	—	September 25, 2008	Kitt Peak	Spacewatch	·	2.4 km	MPC · JPL
278786	2008 SF_{190}	—	September 25, 2008	Kitt Peak	Spacewatch	·	910 m	MPC · JPL
278787	2008 SW_{190}	—	September 25, 2008	Mount Lemmon	Mount Lemmon Survey	·	1.8 km	MPC · JPL
278788	2008 SF_{191}	—	September 25, 2008	Mount Lemmon	Mount Lemmon Survey	·	3.3 km	MPC · JPL
278789	2008 SC_{196}	—	September 25, 2008	Kitt Peak	Spacewatch	AGN	1.4 km	MPC · JPL
278790	2008 SX_{196}	—	September 25, 2008	Kitt Peak	Spacewatch	·	2.1 km	MPC · JPL
278791	2008 SL_{198}	—	September 25, 2008	Kitt Peak	Spacewatch	·	2.2 km	MPC · JPL
278792	2008 SK_{202}	—	September 26, 2008	Kitt Peak	Spacewatch	CYB	4.4 km	MPC · JPL
278793	2008 SA_{204}	—	September 26, 2008	Kitt Peak	Spacewatch	KON	3.8 km	MPC · JPL
278794	2008 SW_{207}	—	September 27, 2008	Catalina	CSS	·	2.0 km	MPC · JPL
278795	2008 SC_{210}	—	September 28, 2008	Junk Bond	D. Healy	·	1.2 km	MPC · JPL
278796	2008 SN_{218}	—	September 29, 2008	Hibiscus	Teamo, N.	·	1.9 km	MPC · JPL
278797	2008 SS_{218}	—	September 30, 2008	La Sagra	OAM	ERI	2.3 km	MPC · JPL
278798	2008 SE_{229}	—	September 28, 2008	Mount Lemmon	Mount Lemmon Survey	·	1.4 km	MPC · JPL
278799	2008 SY_{232}	—	September 28, 2008	Mount Lemmon	Mount Lemmon Survey	·	2.5 km	MPC · JPL
278800	2008 ST_{233}	—	September 28, 2008	Mount Lemmon	Mount Lemmon Survey	·	2.0 km	MPC · JPL

== 278801–278900 ==
back to top

Designation			Discovery			Properties		Ref
Permanent	Provisional	Named after	Date	Site	Discoverer(s)	Category	Diam.	Ref
278801	2008 SJ_{235}	—	September 28, 2008	Mount Lemmon	Mount Lemmon Survey	·	2.5 km	MPC · JPL
278802	2008 SK_{238}	—	September 29, 2008	Kitt Peak	Spacewatch	·	2.4 km	MPC · JPL
278803	2008 ST_{238}	—	December 20, 2004	Mount Lemmon	Mount Lemmon Survey	·	2.4 km	MPC · JPL
278804	2008 SM_{241}	—	September 29, 2008	Catalina	CSS	·	2.4 km	MPC · JPL
278805	2008 SX_{242}	—	September 29, 2008	Kitt Peak	Spacewatch	KON	4.2 km	MPC · JPL
278806	2008 SC_{244}	—	September 24, 2008	Kitt Peak	Spacewatch	·	2.9 km	MPC · JPL
278807	2008 SQ_{244}	—	September 29, 2008	Goodricke-Pigott	R. A. Tucker	KOR	1.7 km	MPC · JPL
278808	2008 SY_{244}	—	September 29, 2008	Catalina	CSS	·	1.9 km	MPC · JPL
278809	2008 SS_{246}	—	September 30, 2008	La Sagra	OAM	·	1.9 km	MPC · JPL
278810	2008 SH_{248}	—	September 20, 2008	Kitt Peak	Spacewatch	KOR	1.4 km	MPC · JPL
278811	2008 SW_{248}	—	September 21, 2008	Catalina	CSS	ERI	1.7 km	MPC · JPL
278812	2008 SG_{253}	—	September 21, 2008	Kitt Peak	Spacewatch	EOS	3.3 km	MPC · JPL
278813	2008 SV_{253}	—	September 22, 2008	Kitt Peak	Spacewatch	·	2.0 km	MPC · JPL
278814	2008 SC_{255}	—	September 23, 2008	Mount Lemmon	Mount Lemmon Survey	·	2.6 km	MPC · JPL
278815	2008 SO_{255}	—	September 25, 2008	Kitt Peak	Spacewatch	·	2.9 km	MPC · JPL
278816	2008 SQ_{255}	—	September 25, 2008	Kitt Peak	Spacewatch	·	2.8 km	MPC · JPL
278817	2008 SD_{256}	—	September 20, 2008	Kitt Peak	Spacewatch	THM	2.5 km	MPC · JPL
278818	2008 SL_{257}	—	September 22, 2008	Mount Lemmon	Mount Lemmon Survey	·	2.5 km	MPC · JPL
278819	2008 SS_{258}	—	September 22, 2008	Catalina	CSS	EUN	1.6 km	MPC · JPL
278820	2008 SL_{261}	—	September 23, 2008	Kitt Peak	Spacewatch	HOF	3.4 km	MPC · JPL
278821	2008 ST_{261}	—	September 24, 2008	Catalina	CSS	·	1.8 km	MPC · JPL
278822	2008 SF_{262}	—	September 24, 2008	Kitt Peak	Spacewatch	·	2.8 km	MPC · JPL
278823	2008 SZ_{263}	—	September 24, 2008	Mount Lemmon	Mount Lemmon Survey	·	2.3 km	MPC · JPL
278824	2008 SF_{266}	—	September 24, 2008	Kitt Peak	Spacewatch	KOR	2.1 km	MPC · JPL
278825	2008 SS_{268}	—	September 29, 2008	Catalina	CSS	·	3.0 km	MPC · JPL
278826	2008 SY_{268}	—	September 30, 2008	Catalina	CSS	·	2.9 km	MPC · JPL
278827	2008 SV_{269}	—	September 22, 2008	Mount Lemmon	Mount Lemmon Survey	·	2.2 km	MPC · JPL
278828	2008 SA_{272}	—	September 29, 2008	Catalina	CSS	·	5.2 km	MPC · JPL
278829	2008 SV_{272}	—	September 24, 2008	Mount Lemmon	Mount Lemmon Survey	·	3.4 km	MPC · JPL
278830	2008 SB_{273}	—	September 29, 2008	Catalina	CSS	·	2.7 km	MPC · JPL
278831	2008 SS_{285}	—	September 21, 2008	Kitt Peak	Spacewatch	·	1.7 km	MPC · JPL
278832	2008 ST_{286}	—	September 22, 2008	Catalina	CSS	·	4.2 km	MPC · JPL
278833	2008 SN_{287}	—	September 23, 2008	Kitt Peak	Spacewatch	·	2.0 km	MPC · JPL
278834	2008 SR_{288}	—	February 5, 2002	Anderson Mesa	LONEOS	JUN	1.7 km	MPC · JPL
278835	2008 SB_{289}	—	September 25, 2008	Kitt Peak	Spacewatch	·	3.5 km	MPC · JPL
278836	2008 SC_{289}	—	September 25, 2008	Kitt Peak	Spacewatch	·	2.0 km	MPC · JPL
278837	2008 SQ_{295}	—	September 27, 2008	Catalina	CSS	·	3.0 km	MPC · JPL
278838	2008 ST_{300}	—	September 23, 2008	Socorro	LINEAR	·	2.9 km	MPC · JPL
278839	2008 SL_{301}	—	September 23, 2008	Socorro	LINEAR	·	2.9 km	MPC · JPL
278840	2008 SE_{303}	—	September 24, 2008	Socorro	LINEAR	·	4.6 km	MPC · JPL
278841	2008 SH_{304}	—	September 24, 2008	Mount Lemmon	Mount Lemmon Survey	·	2.4 km	MPC · JPL
278842	2008 SJ_{304}	—	September 24, 2008	Mount Lemmon	Mount Lemmon Survey	·	2.0 km	MPC · JPL
278843	2008 SV_{305}	—	September 28, 2008	Socorro	LINEAR	·	2.8 km	MPC · JPL
278844	2008 SE_{308}	—	September 29, 2008	Mount Lemmon	Mount Lemmon Survey	·	2.0 km	MPC · JPL
278845	2008 SV_{308}	—	September 22, 2008	Socorro	LINEAR	·	1.4 km	MPC · JPL
278846	2008 SH_{309}	—	September 23, 2008	Socorro	LINEAR	·	4.1 km	MPC · JPL
278847	2008 TX_{1}	—	October 3, 2008	Cordell-Lorenz	D. T. Durig	WIT	1.4 km	MPC · JPL
278848	2008 TX_{2}	—	October 4, 2008	Cordell-Lorenz	D. T. Durig	EOS	2.2 km	MPC · JPL
278849	2008 TU_{5}	—	October 2, 2008	La Sagra	OAM	·	1.8 km	MPC · JPL
278850	2008 TU_{7}	—	October 4, 2008	La Sagra	OAM	AST	1.8 km	MPC · JPL
278851	2008 TV_{8}	—	October 5, 2008	Hibiscus	Teamo, N.	·	2.9 km	MPC · JPL
278852	2008 TM_{16}	—	October 1, 2008	Catalina	CSS	GEF	1.6 km	MPC · JPL
278853	2008 TG_{17}	—	October 1, 2008	Mount Lemmon	Mount Lemmon Survey	·	1.9 km	MPC · JPL
278854	2008 TS_{20}	—	October 1, 2008	Mount Lemmon	Mount Lemmon Survey	·	3.5 km	MPC · JPL
278855	2008 TX_{21}	—	October 1, 2008	Mount Lemmon	Mount Lemmon Survey	·	3.2 km	MPC · JPL
278856	2008 TZ_{22}	—	October 2, 2008	Kitt Peak	Spacewatch	KOR	1.7 km	MPC · JPL
278857	2008 TY_{24}	—	October 2, 2008	Mount Lemmon	Mount Lemmon Survey	VER	3.3 km	MPC · JPL
278858	2008 TW_{27}	—	October 1, 2008	La Sagra	OAM	·	2.8 km	MPC · JPL
278859	2008 TL_{29}	—	October 1, 2008	Mount Lemmon	Mount Lemmon Survey	·	1.1 km	MPC · JPL
278860	2008 TN_{29}	—	October 1, 2008	Catalina	CSS	·	2.2 km	MPC · JPL
278861	2008 TR_{30}	—	October 1, 2008	Kitt Peak	Spacewatch	KOR	1.7 km	MPC · JPL
278862	2008 TG_{33}	—	October 1, 2008	Kitt Peak	Spacewatch	(5)	1.4 km	MPC · JPL
278863	2008 TO_{35}	—	October 1, 2008	Mount Lemmon	Mount Lemmon Survey	WIT	1.2 km	MPC · JPL
278864	2008 TT_{38}	—	October 1, 2008	Kitt Peak	Spacewatch	VER	3.2 km	MPC · JPL
278865	2008 TW_{44}	—	October 1, 2008	Mount Lemmon	Mount Lemmon Survey	·	3.4 km	MPC · JPL
278866	2008 TP_{49}	—	October 2, 2008	Kitt Peak	Spacewatch	·	2.4 km	MPC · JPL
278867	2008 TR_{53}	—	October 2, 2008	Kitt Peak	Spacewatch	·	1.7 km	MPC · JPL
278868	2008 TT_{56}	—	October 2, 2008	Kitt Peak	Spacewatch	·	3.8 km	MPC · JPL
278869	2008 TD_{57}	—	October 2, 2008	Kitt Peak	Spacewatch	·	2.1 km	MPC · JPL
278870	2008 TX_{57}	—	October 2, 2008	Kitt Peak	Spacewatch	KOR	1.4 km	MPC · JPL
278871	2008 TC_{58}	—	October 2, 2008	Kitt Peak	Spacewatch	·	2.3 km	MPC · JPL
278872	2008 TG_{62}	—	October 2, 2008	Kitt Peak	Spacewatch	EOS	2.2 km	MPC · JPL
278873	2008 TH_{62}	—	October 2, 2008	Kitt Peak	Spacewatch	KOR	1.5 km	MPC · JPL
278874	2008 TS_{62}	—	October 2, 2008	Kitt Peak	Spacewatch	·	2.1 km	MPC · JPL
278875	2008 TC_{63}	—	October 2, 2008	Catalina	CSS	·	2.7 km	MPC · JPL
278876	2008 TM_{64}	—	October 2, 2008	Kitt Peak	Spacewatch	·	2.0 km	MPC · JPL
278877	2008 TA_{68}	—	October 2, 2008	Kitt Peak	Spacewatch	·	3.0 km	MPC · JPL
278878	2008 TS_{69}	—	October 2, 2008	Kitt Peak	Spacewatch	HYG	4.2 km	MPC · JPL
278879	2008 TF_{71}	—	October 2, 2008	Kitt Peak	Spacewatch	·	2.0 km	MPC · JPL
278880	2008 TX_{73}	—	October 2, 2008	Kitt Peak	Spacewatch	·	2.6 km	MPC · JPL
278881	2008 TC_{76}	—	September 3, 2008	Kitt Peak	Spacewatch	·	3.1 km	MPC · JPL
278882	2008 TH_{77}	—	October 2, 2008	Mount Lemmon	Mount Lemmon Survey	·	1.2 km	MPC · JPL
278883	2008 TL_{78}	—	October 2, 2008	Mount Lemmon	Mount Lemmon Survey	·	1.2 km	MPC · JPL
278884	2008 TF_{79}	—	October 2, 2008	Mount Lemmon	Mount Lemmon Survey	DOR	3.0 km	MPC · JPL
278885	2008 TF_{82}	—	October 2, 2008	La Sagra	OAM	(5)	1.6 km	MPC · JPL
278886	2008 TD_{84}	—	October 3, 2008	Kitt Peak	Spacewatch	·	2.7 km	MPC · JPL
278887	2008 TA_{86}	—	October 3, 2008	Mount Lemmon	Mount Lemmon Survey	EUN	1.6 km	MPC · JPL
278888	2008 TP_{87}	—	October 3, 2008	Kitt Peak	Spacewatch	·	2.2 km	MPC · JPL
278889	2008 TC_{88}	—	October 3, 2008	Kitt Peak	Spacewatch	MIS	3.9 km	MPC · JPL
278890	2008 TK_{88}	—	October 3, 2008	Kitt Peak	Spacewatch	·	3.3 km	MPC · JPL
278891	2008 TL_{94}	—	January 31, 2006	Kitt Peak	Spacewatch	·	2.3 km	MPC · JPL
278892	2008 TZ_{103}	—	October 6, 2008	Kitt Peak	Spacewatch	·	1.7 km	MPC · JPL
278893	2008 TV_{104}	—	October 6, 2008	Kitt Peak	Spacewatch	·	3.4 km	MPC · JPL
278894	2008 TD_{108}	—	October 6, 2008	Mount Lemmon	Mount Lemmon Survey	·	2.7 km	MPC · JPL
278895	2008 TG_{108}	—	October 6, 2008	Mount Lemmon	Mount Lemmon Survey	·	3.1 km	MPC · JPL
278896	2008 TL_{108}	—	October 6, 2008	Mount Lemmon	Mount Lemmon Survey	·	2.2 km	MPC · JPL
278897	2008 TO_{108}	—	October 6, 2008	Mount Lemmon	Mount Lemmon Survey	·	1.5 km	MPC · JPL
278898	2008 TU_{111}	—	October 6, 2008	Catalina	CSS	·	4.3 km	MPC · JPL
278899	2008 TO_{113}	—	October 6, 2008	Kitt Peak	Spacewatch	·	1.1 km	MPC · JPL
278900	2008 TK_{114}	—	October 6, 2008	Kitt Peak	Spacewatch	·	2.5 km	MPC · JPL

== 278901–279000 ==
back to top

Designation			Discovery			Properties		Ref
Permanent	Provisional	Named after	Date	Site	Discoverer(s)	Category	Diam.	Ref
278901	2008 TC_{115}	—	October 6, 2008	Catalina	CSS	EOS	2.2 km	MPC · JPL
278902	2008 TV_{118}	—	October 7, 2008	Kitt Peak	Spacewatch	·	1.7 km	MPC · JPL
278903	2008 TX_{123}	—	October 8, 2008	Mount Lemmon	Mount Lemmon Survey	·	2.3 km	MPC · JPL
278904	2008 TV_{129}	—	October 8, 2008	Mount Lemmon	Mount Lemmon Survey	·	2.6 km	MPC · JPL
278905	2008 TF_{130}	—	October 8, 2008	Mount Lemmon	Mount Lemmon Survey	·	2.0 km	MPC · JPL
278906	2008 TB_{144}	—	October 9, 2008	Mount Lemmon	Mount Lemmon Survey	AST	1.8 km	MPC · JPL
278907	2008 TQ_{144}	—	October 9, 2008	Mount Lemmon	Mount Lemmon Survey	·	2.0 km	MPC · JPL
278908	2008 TW_{145}	—	October 9, 2008	Mount Lemmon	Mount Lemmon Survey	·	1.8 km	MPC · JPL
278909	2008 TG_{147}	—	October 9, 2008	Mount Lemmon	Mount Lemmon Survey	KOR	1.3 km	MPC · JPL
278910	2008 TP_{148}	—	October 9, 2008	Mount Lemmon	Mount Lemmon Survey	·	2.6 km	MPC · JPL
278911	2008 TG_{149}	—	October 9, 2008	Mount Lemmon	Mount Lemmon Survey	·	1.9 km	MPC · JPL
278912	2008 TN_{149}	—	October 9, 2008	Mount Lemmon	Mount Lemmon Survey	KOR	1.8 km	MPC · JPL
278913	2008 TQ_{150}	—	October 9, 2008	Mount Lemmon	Mount Lemmon Survey	PAD	1.7 km	MPC · JPL
278914	2008 TJ_{156}	—	October 9, 2008	Kitt Peak	Spacewatch	·	2.0 km	MPC · JPL
278915	2008 TN_{157}	—	October 4, 2008	Catalina	CSS	ADE	2.6 km	MPC · JPL
278916	2008 TU_{157}	—	October 4, 2008	Catalina	CSS	·	1.5 km	MPC · JPL
278917	2008 TG_{163}	—	October 1, 2008	Catalina	CSS	·	3.5 km	MPC · JPL
278918	2008 TC_{164}	—	October 1, 2008	Catalina	CSS	·	3.3 km	MPC · JPL
278919	2008 TL_{164}	—	October 1, 2008	Catalina	CSS	·	3.1 km	MPC · JPL
278920	2008 TW_{165}	—	October 6, 2008	Mount Lemmon	Mount Lemmon Survey	·	2.8 km	MPC · JPL
278921	2008 TK_{172}	—	October 2, 2008	Mount Lemmon	Mount Lemmon Survey	·	2.9 km	MPC · JPL
278922	2008 TZ_{176}	—	October 1, 2008	Catalina	CSS	EUN	1.8 km	MPC · JPL
278923	2008 TO_{182}	—	October 1, 2008	Mount Lemmon	Mount Lemmon Survey	CYB	4.0 km	MPC · JPL
278924	2008 TY_{183}	—	October 3, 2008	Socorro	LINEAR	KON	3.9 km	MPC · JPL
278925	2008 TE_{185}	—	October 6, 2008	Mount Lemmon	Mount Lemmon Survey	·	4.5 km	MPC · JPL
278926	2008 TM_{185}	—	October 6, 2008	Mount Lemmon	Mount Lemmon Survey	·	2.1 km	MPC · JPL
278927	2008 UJ_{3}	—	October 21, 2008	Needville	J. Dellinger, Eastman, M.	·	4.5 km	MPC · JPL
278928	2008 UW_{4}	—	October 25, 2008	Sierra Stars	Tozzi, F.	·	2.4 km	MPC · JPL
278929	2008 UH_{7}	—	October 27, 2008	Catalina	CSS	·	4.4 km	MPC · JPL
278930	2008 UO_{7}	—	October 26, 2008	Bisei SG Center	BATTeRS	EOS	2.9 km	MPC · JPL
278931	2008 UQ_{11}	—	October 17, 2008	Kitt Peak	Spacewatch	·	3.5 km	MPC · JPL
278932	2008 UE_{13}	—	October 17, 2008	Kitt Peak	Spacewatch	KOR	1.4 km	MPC · JPL
278933	2008 UF_{13}	—	October 17, 2008	Kitt Peak	Spacewatch	·	1.4 km	MPC · JPL
278934	2008 UO_{13}	—	October 17, 2008	Kitt Peak	Spacewatch	·	5.0 km	MPC · JPL
278935	2008 UK_{21}	—	October 19, 2008	Kitt Peak	Spacewatch	·	2.0 km	MPC · JPL
278936	2008 UL_{21}	—	October 19, 2008	Kitt Peak	Spacewatch	·	3.0 km	MPC · JPL
278937	2008 UR_{25}	—	October 20, 2008	Mount Lemmon	Mount Lemmon Survey	·	1.3 km	MPC · JPL
278938	2008 UW_{27}	—	October 20, 2008	Kitt Peak	Spacewatch	·	4.6 km	MPC · JPL
278939	2008 UQ_{34}	—	October 20, 2008	Kitt Peak	Spacewatch	(1118)	3.4 km	MPC · JPL
278940	2008 UD_{41}	—	October 20, 2008	Kitt Peak	Spacewatch	·	2.5 km	MPC · JPL
278941	2008 UU_{42}	—	October 20, 2008	Kitt Peak	Spacewatch	URS	4.7 km	MPC · JPL
278942	2008 UF_{45}	—	October 20, 2008	Mount Lemmon	Mount Lemmon Survey	·	2.0 km	MPC · JPL
278943	2008 UA_{48}	—	October 20, 2008	Mount Lemmon	Mount Lemmon Survey	EOS ·	4.7 km	MPC · JPL
278944	2008 UR_{52}	—	October 20, 2008	Kitt Peak	Spacewatch	·	2.9 km	MPC · JPL
278945	2008 UH_{55}	—	October 21, 2008	Kitt Peak	Spacewatch	·	2.0 km	MPC · JPL
278946	2008 UJ_{60}	—	October 21, 2008	Kitt Peak	Spacewatch	·	1.8 km	MPC · JPL
278947	2008 UF_{61}	—	October 21, 2008	Kitt Peak	Spacewatch	·	2.3 km	MPC · JPL
278948	2008 UR_{62}	—	October 21, 2008	Kitt Peak	Spacewatch	·	4.7 km	MPC · JPL
278949	2008 UP_{63}	—	October 21, 2008	Kitt Peak	Spacewatch	EOS	2.5 km	MPC · JPL
278950	2008 UZ_{63}	—	October 21, 2008	Mount Lemmon	Mount Lemmon Survey	WIT	1.0 km	MPC · JPL
278951	2008 UU_{64}	—	October 21, 2008	Kitt Peak	Spacewatch	(43176)	4.7 km	MPC · JPL
278952	2008 UF_{70}	—	October 21, 2008	Kitt Peak	Spacewatch	EOS	2.6 km	MPC · JPL
278953	2008 UN_{72}	—	October 21, 2008	Mount Lemmon	Mount Lemmon Survey	·	4.4 km	MPC · JPL
278954	2008 UY_{72}	—	October 21, 2008	Kitt Peak	Spacewatch	·	4.8 km	MPC · JPL
278955	2008 UU_{74}	—	October 21, 2008	Kitt Peak	Spacewatch	·	4.0 km	MPC · JPL
278956 Shei-Pa	2008 UZ_{83}	Shei-Pa	October 22, 2008	Lulin	Hsiao, H.-Y., Q. Ye	·	3.8 km	MPC · JPL
278957	2008 UG_{84}	—	October 23, 2008	Kitt Peak	Spacewatch	·	4.1 km	MPC · JPL
278958	2008 UX_{90}	—	October 25, 2008	Kitt Peak	Spacewatch	·	2.0 km	MPC · JPL
278959	2008 UF_{92}	—	October 23, 2008	Socorro	LINEAR	·	3.3 km	MPC · JPL
278960	2008 UE_{94}	—	October 25, 2008	Socorro	LINEAR	JUN	1.2 km	MPC · JPL
278961	2008 UO_{94}	—	October 26, 2008	Socorro	LINEAR	·	3.3 km	MPC · JPL
278962	2008 UD_{96}	—	October 24, 2008	Socorro	LINEAR	·	2.7 km	MPC · JPL
278963	2008 UD_{97}	—	October 25, 2008	Socorro	LINEAR	·	2.5 km	MPC · JPL
278964	2008 UV_{98}	—	October 27, 2008	Socorro	LINEAR	(5)	1.8 km	MPC · JPL
278965	2008 UZ_{101}	—	October 20, 2008	Kitt Peak	Spacewatch	VER	2.9 km	MPC · JPL
278966	2008 UY_{105}	—	October 21, 2008	Kitt Peak	Spacewatch	·	2.2 km	MPC · JPL
278967	2008 UM_{114}	—	October 22, 2008	Kitt Peak	Spacewatch	·	2.5 km	MPC · JPL
278968	2008 UR_{115}	—	October 22, 2008	Kitt Peak	Spacewatch	·	3.7 km	MPC · JPL
278969	2008 UU_{129}	—	October 23, 2008	Kitt Peak	Spacewatch	(5)	1.3 km	MPC · JPL
278970	2008 UD_{131}	—	October 23, 2008	Kitt Peak	Spacewatch	AGN	1.7 km	MPC · JPL
278971	2008 UL_{144}	—	October 23, 2008	Kitt Peak	Spacewatch	·	1.9 km	MPC · JPL
278972	2008 UN_{154}	—	October 23, 2008	Mount Lemmon	Mount Lemmon Survey	·	4.0 km	MPC · JPL
278973	2008 UO_{159}	—	October 23, 2008	Kitt Peak	Spacewatch	·	2.8 km	MPC · JPL
278974	2008 UF_{160}	—	October 23, 2008	Kitt Peak	Spacewatch	·	2.3 km	MPC · JPL
278975	2008 UZ_{162}	—	October 24, 2008	Kitt Peak	Spacewatch	·	2.5 km	MPC · JPL
278976	2008 UM_{166}	—	October 24, 2008	Kitt Peak	Spacewatch	·	3.7 km	MPC · JPL
278977	2008 UQ_{168}	—	October 24, 2008	Kitt Peak	Spacewatch	·	3.2 km	MPC · JPL
278978	2008 UX_{169}	—	October 24, 2008	Catalina	CSS	·	3.0 km	MPC · JPL
278979	2008 UN_{173}	—	October 24, 2008	Kitt Peak	Spacewatch	·	5.2 km	MPC · JPL
278980	2008 UM_{176}	—	October 24, 2008	Mount Lemmon	Mount Lemmon Survey	·	3.1 km	MPC · JPL
278981	2008 UX_{177}	—	October 24, 2008	Mount Lemmon	Mount Lemmon Survey	·	2.8 km	MPC · JPL
278982	2008 UD_{183}	—	October 24, 2008	Mount Lemmon	Mount Lemmon Survey	·	3.1 km	MPC · JPL
278983	2008 UM_{190}	—	October 25, 2008	Catalina	CSS	·	4.2 km	MPC · JPL
278984	2008 UZ_{193}	—	October 25, 2008	Mount Lemmon	Mount Lemmon Survey	EOS	2.5 km	MPC · JPL
278985	2008 UU_{195}	—	October 26, 2008	Mount Lemmon	Mount Lemmon Survey	EOS · slow	2.7 km	MPC · JPL
278986 Chenshuchu	2008 UQ_{205}	Chenshuchu	October 20, 2008	Lulin	Hsiao, X. Y., Q. Ye	KOR	2.0 km	MPC · JPL
278987	2008 UW_{205}	—	October 27, 2008	Skylive	Tozzi, F.	·	2.6 km	MPC · JPL
278988	2008 UU_{209}	—	October 23, 2008	Kitt Peak	Spacewatch	·	2.1 km	MPC · JPL
278989	2008 UV_{210}	—	October 23, 2008	Kitt Peak	Spacewatch	KOR	1.5 km	MPC · JPL
278990	2008 UO_{211}	—	October 23, 2008	Mount Lemmon	Mount Lemmon Survey	·	3.9 km	MPC · JPL
278991	2008 UH_{214}	—	October 24, 2008	Catalina	CSS	EOS	2.2 km	MPC · JPL
278992	2008 UN_{214}	—	October 24, 2008	Catalina	CSS	BRA	2.0 km	MPC · JPL
278993	2008 UD_{216}	—	October 24, 2008	Catalina	CSS	KRM	3.3 km	MPC · JPL
278994	2008 UJ_{218}	—	October 25, 2008	Kitt Peak	Spacewatch	JUN	1.7 km	MPC · JPL
278995	2008 US_{223}	—	October 25, 2008	Catalina	CSS	WIT	1.4 km	MPC · JPL
278996	2008 UV_{223}	—	October 25, 2008	Catalina	CSS	·	2.5 km	MPC · JPL
278997	2008 UC_{224}	—	October 25, 2008	Kitt Peak	Spacewatch	VER	4.5 km	MPC · JPL
278998	2008 UJ_{226}	—	October 25, 2008	Mount Lemmon	Mount Lemmon Survey	·	2.3 km	MPC · JPL
278999	2008 UF_{235}	—	October 26, 2008	Mount Lemmon	Mount Lemmon Survey	·	1.4 km	MPC · JPL
279000	2008 UF_{241}	—	October 26, 2008	Kitt Peak	Spacewatch	·	1.7 km	MPC · JPL

back to top

== See also ==
- Meanings of minor-planet names: 278001–279000
