= László Heller =

Hungarian engineer, university professor, academic

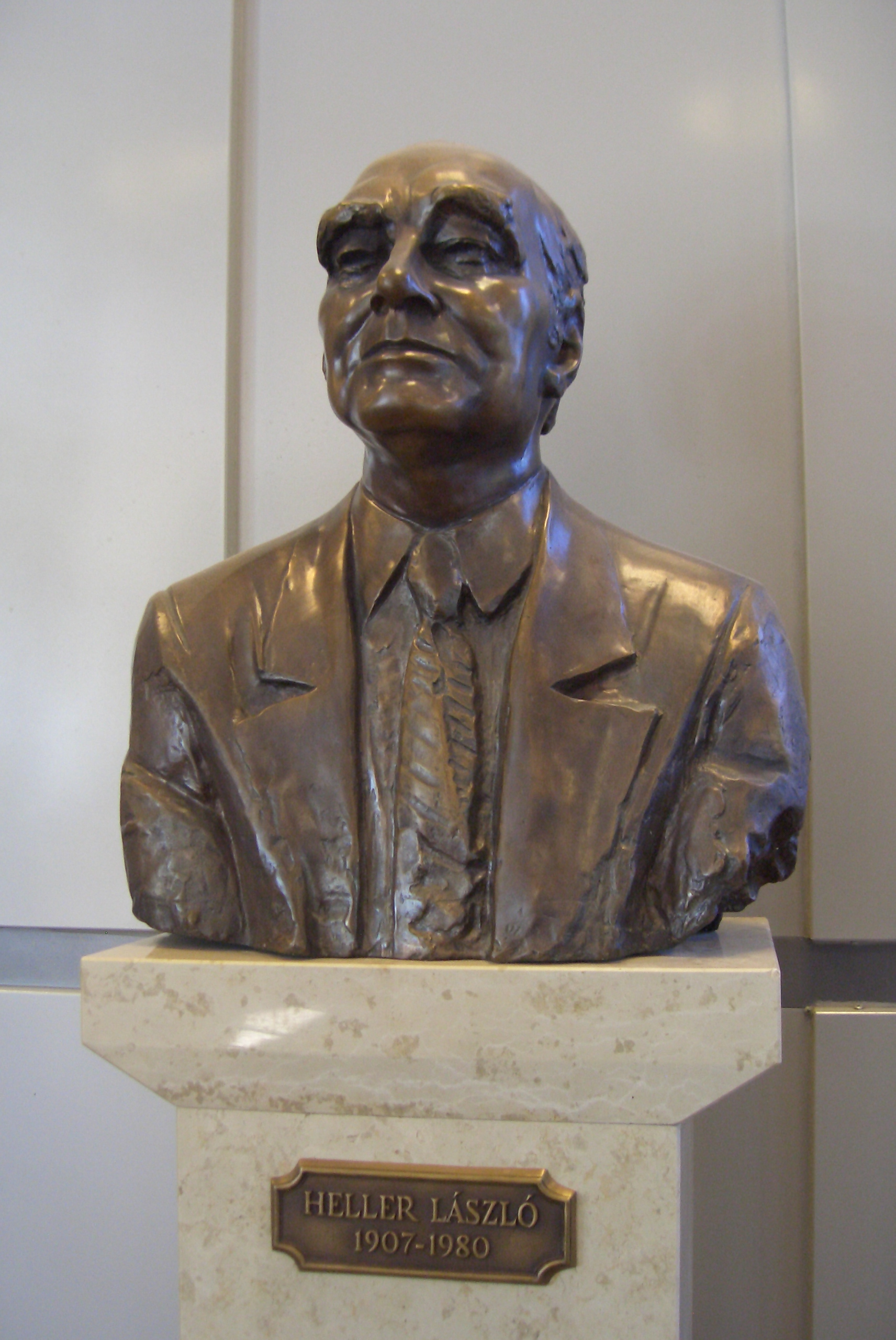
His bust at the Budapest University of Technology and Economics

Heller László (1907—1980) was a Hungarian professor and mechanical engineer credited with inventing the Heller–Forgó dry cooling tower system for power stations.

== Biography ==
Born in Nagyvárad (now Oradea, Romania), Heller took a degree in mechanical engineering in 1931 at the Eidgenössische Technische Hochschule in Zurich.

In the 1940s the first high-pressure industrial power station was built according to his plans. It was around this time that he invented the Heller–Forgó system.

In 1951 he was awarded the Kossuth Prize and moved to the Budapest University of Technology and Economics, a.k.a. Technical University of Budapest. He organized its Department of Energetics, where he worked as a professor. He was a large contributor to the domain of statics, and helped establish the concept of entropy for engineering practices.

In 1962 he became a full member of the Hungarian Academy of Sciences.

== Heller–Forgó system ==
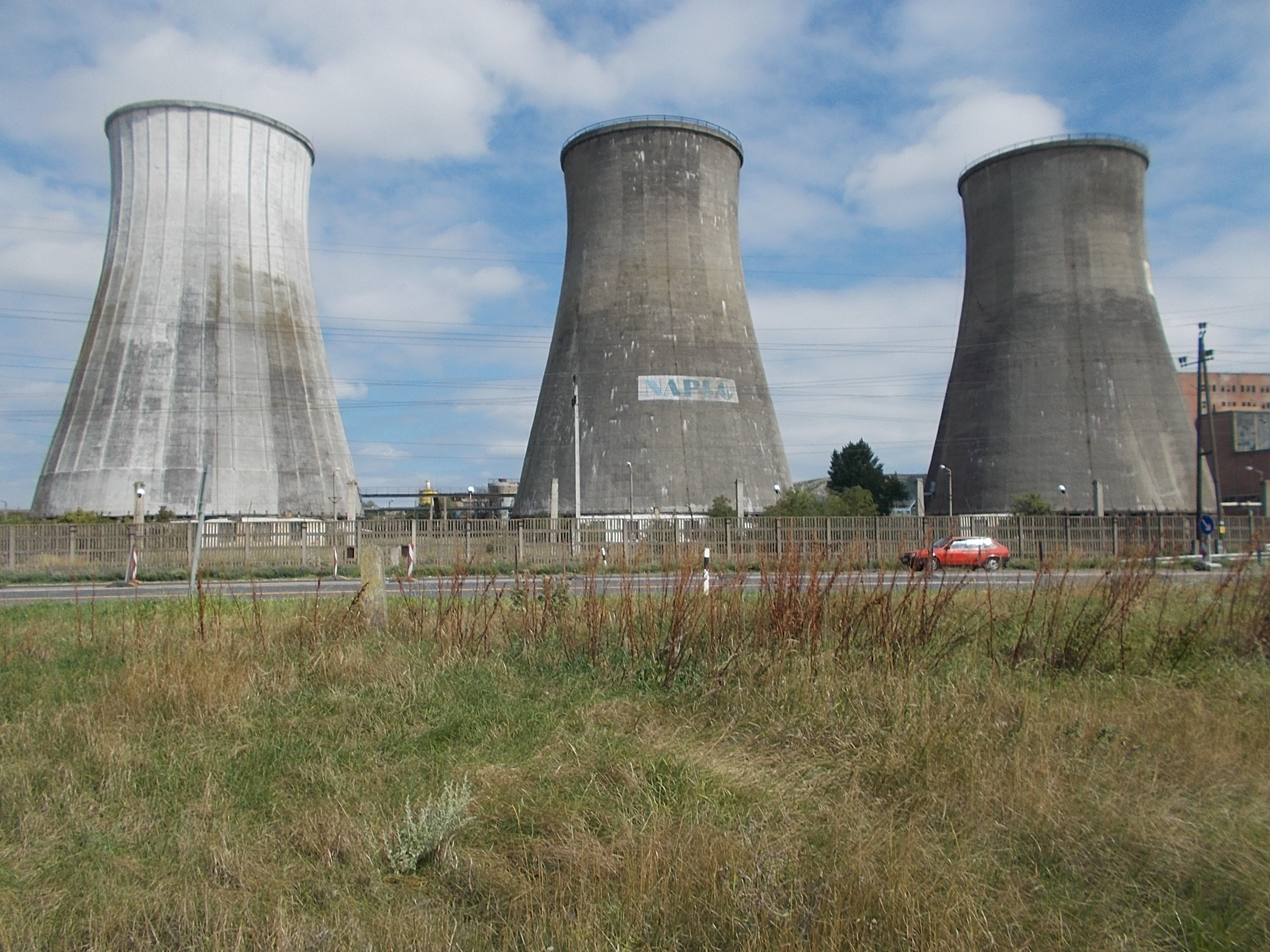
Heller-Forgó cooling towers at the Inota Power Plant (view from south), near Székesfehérvár Hungary

The Heller–Forgó system is named after Heller and László Forgó (1907–1985), the active collaborator in the industrial implementation of the system. It was developed by 1958, and the international sales pitch was set the same year.

Also known as the Indirect Dry Cooling System, it solved an important problem at power stations by utilizing cooling water more efficiently. The main point of their invention was to condense the vacuum steam using an injection of cool water. The still-warm water enters into the fine-gilled heat exchanger, cools down and becomes usable again for when the cycle is repeated. Installations include a water-cooled steam condenser, circulating machine groups, circulating water mains and a dry cooling tower which contains Forgó-type water-to-air heat exchangers. Heller's key achievement was to obtain the least condenser temperature for a given temperature of incoming cooling water by keeping the terminal temperature difference (TTD) as low as possible. The heat transfer between the working fluid and the cooling air is achieved by convection only and not by evaporation as in a wet cooling tower.

The firm set up by Heller and Forgo attracted attention from MDAX-listed GEA Group which held its shares from its privatization in 1992, until 2020 when the EGI firm was sold to Hungary’s monopoly power company, state-owned MVM Group.

In 2023 the system attracted the attention of some Iranian academics who were interested in the replacement of a wet cooling tower.

== Awards, honors and legacy ==
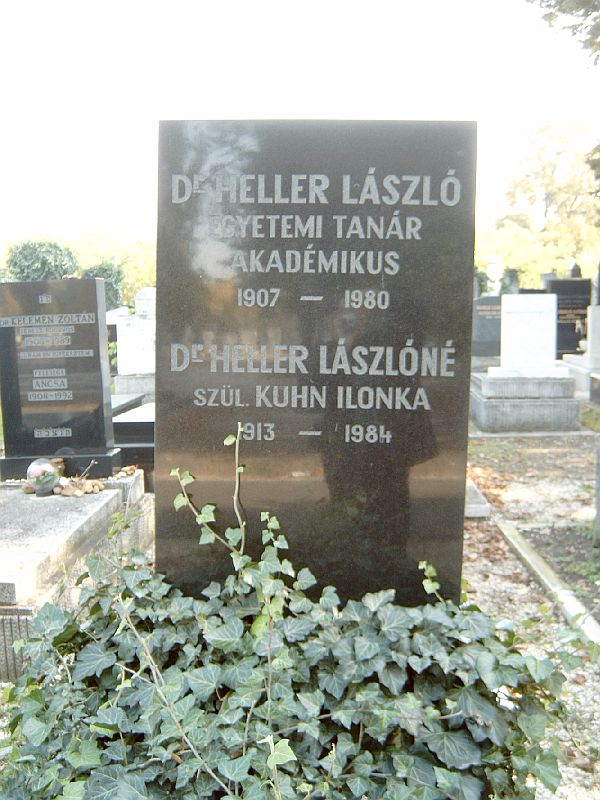
His grave in Kozma Street Cemetery, the biggest Jewish cemetery of Budapest.

Asteroid 276975 Heller, discovered by Hungarian astronomer Krisztián Sárneczky at Piszkéstető Station in 2004, was named in his honor. The official naming citation was published by the Minor Planet Center on 8 October 2014 (M.P.C. 90380).
