= Meanings of minor-planet names: 276001–277000 =

As minor planet discoveries are confirmed, they are given a permanent number by the IAU's Minor Planet Center (MPC), and the discoverers can then submit names for them, following the IAU's naming conventions. The list below concerns those minor planets in the specified number-range that have received names, and explains the meanings of those names.

Official naming citations of newly named small Solar System bodies are approved and published in a bulletin by IAU's Working Group for Small Bodies Nomenclature (WGSBN). Before May 2021, citations were published in MPC's Minor Planet Circulars for many decades. Recent citations can also be found on the JPL Small-Body Database (SBDB). Until his death in 2016, German astronomer Lutz D. Schmadel compiled these citations into the Dictionary of Minor Planet Names (DMP) and regularly updated the collection.

Based on Paul Herget's The Names of the Minor Planets, Schmadel also researched the unclear origin of numerous asteroids, most of which had been named prior to World War II. This article incorporates text from this source, which is in the public domain: SBDB New namings may only be added to this list below after official publication as the preannouncement of names is condemned. The WGSBN publishes a comprehensive guideline for the naming rules of non-cometary small Solar System bodies.

== 276001–276100 ==
Named minor planet	Provisional	This minor planet was named for...	Ref · Catalog
There are no named minor planets in this number range

== 276101–276200 ==
back to top

Named minor planet	Provisional	This minor planet was named for...	Ref · Catalog
276163 Tafreshi	2002 LV_{62}	Babak Amin Tafreshi (b. 1978), an Iranian-born photographer, journalist and amateur astronomer.	IAU · 276163

== 276201–276300 ==
back to top

Named minor planet	Provisional	This minor planet was named for...	Ref · Catalog
There are no named minor planets in this number range

== 276301–276400 ==
back to top

Named minor planet	Provisional	This minor planet was named for...	Ref · Catalog
276389 Winkel	2002 WV_{28}	Jan Maarten Winkel (b. 1961), a Dutch amateur astronomer.	IAU · 276389

== 276401–276500 ==
back to top

Named minor planet	Provisional	This minor planet was named for...	Ref · Catalog
There are no named minor planets in this number range

== 276501–276600 ==
back to top

Named minor planet	Provisional	This minor planet was named for...	Ref · Catalog
276568 Joestübler	2003 ST_{217}	Johannes Stübler (born 1958), an Austrian amateur astronomer and member of the Astronomical Society of Linz, who has been involved in public outreach activities in many national and international astronomical organizations, including the IAU (Src)	JPL · 276568

== 276601–276700 ==
back to top

Named minor planet	Provisional	This minor planet was named for...	Ref · Catalog
276681 Loremaes	2003 YT24	Lore Maes (born 2008) is the goddaughter of Jeroen Maes, friend of the Belgian discoverers Thierry Pauwels and Peter De Cat	JPL · 276681

== 276701–276800 ==
back to top

Named minor planet	Provisional	This minor planet was named for...	Ref · Catalog
276781 Montchaibeux	2004 JW_{16}	Montchaibeux, a small hill in the Jura Mountains of Switzerland	JPL · 276781

== 276801–276900 ==
back to top

Named minor planet	Provisional	This minor planet was named for...	Ref · Catalog
There are no named minor planets in this number range

== 276901–277000 ==
back to top

Named minor planet	Provisional	This minor planet was named for...	Ref · Catalog
276975 Heller	2004 VU_{69}	László Heller (1907–1980), a Hungarian professor and mechanical engineer, known for the co-invention of the Heller–Forgó system	JPL · 276975

back to top

Preceded by 275,001–276,000	Meanings of minor-planet names List of minor planets: 276,001–277,000	Succeeded by 277,001–278,000
