= List of minor planets: 276001–277000 =

The following is a partial list of minor planets, running from minor-planet number 276001 through 277000, inclusive. The primary data for this and other partial lists is based on JPL's "Small-Body Orbital Elements" and data available from the Minor Planet Center. Critical list information is also provided by the MPC, unless otherwise specified from Lowell Observatory. A detailed description of the table's columns and additional sources are given on the main page including a complete list of every page in this series, and a statistical break-up on the dynamical classification of minor planets.

Also see the summary list of all named bodies in numerical and alphabetical order, and the corresponding naming citations for the number range of this particular list. New namings may only be added to this list after official publication, as the preannouncement of names is condemned by the Working Group for Small Bodies Nomenclature of the International Astronomical Union.

Near-Earth obj.	MBA (inner)	MBA (outer)	Centaur
Mars-crosser	MBA (middle)	Jupiter trojan	Trans-Neptunian obj.
Unclassified

== 276001–276100 ==
Designation			Discovery			Properties		Ref
Permanent	Provisional	Named after	Date	Site	Discoverer(s)	Category	Diam.	Ref
276001	2001 XJ_{228}	—	December 15, 2001	Socorro	LINEAR	(6769) · fast	1.5 km	MPC · JPL
276002	2001 XA_{246}	—	December 15, 2001	Socorro	LINEAR	(5)	1.9 km	MPC · JPL
276003	2001 YE_{7}	—	December 17, 2001	Socorro	LINEAR	BRG	1.9 km	MPC · JPL
276004	2001 YF_{18}	—	December 17, 2001	Socorro	LINEAR	·	1.7 km	MPC · JPL
276005	2001 YQ_{18}	—	December 17, 2001	Socorro	LINEAR	·	5.3 km	MPC · JPL
276006	2001 YC_{39}	—	December 18, 2001	Socorro	LINEAR	·	1.3 km	MPC · JPL
276007	2001 YP_{49}	—	December 18, 2001	Socorro	LINEAR	·	2.4 km	MPC · JPL
276008	2001 YY_{71}	—	December 18, 2001	Socorro	LINEAR	·	1.4 km	MPC · JPL
276009	2001 YL_{77}	—	December 18, 2001	Socorro	LINEAR	·	2.4 km	MPC · JPL
276010	2001 YO_{79}	—	December 18, 2001	Socorro	LINEAR	·	2.1 km	MPC · JPL
276011	2001 YG_{89}	—	December 18, 2001	Socorro	LINEAR	·	1.5 km	MPC · JPL
276012	2001 YS_{89}	—	December 18, 2001	Socorro	LINEAR	(5)	1.5 km	MPC · JPL
276013	2001 YM_{91}	—	December 17, 2001	Palomar	NEAT	·	2.3 km	MPC · JPL
276014	2001 YG_{107}	—	December 17, 2001	Socorro	LINEAR	·	1.9 km	MPC · JPL
276015	2001 YW_{120}	—	December 20, 2001	Kitt Peak	Spacewatch	·	1.2 km	MPC · JPL
276016	2001 YQ_{124}	—	December 17, 2001	Socorro	LINEAR	·	1.9 km	MPC · JPL
276017	2001 YX_{130}	—	December 17, 2001	Socorro	LINEAR	·	1.6 km	MPC · JPL
276018	2002 AD_{7}	—	January 9, 2002	Cima Ekar	ADAS	·	1.7 km	MPC · JPL
276019	2002 AF_{13}	—	January 11, 2002	Campo Imperatore	CINEOS	EUN	2.0 km	MPC · JPL
276020	2002 AX_{13}	—	January 12, 2002	Desert Eagle	W. K. Y. Yeung	·	1.7 km	MPC · JPL
276021	2002 AA_{23}	—	January 5, 2002	Haleakala	NEAT	·	1.6 km	MPC · JPL
276022	2002 AZ_{27}	—	January 7, 2002	Anderson Mesa	LONEOS	·	1.9 km	MPC · JPL
276023	2002 AK_{44}	—	January 9, 2002	Socorro	LINEAR	·	1.2 km	MPC · JPL
276024	2002 AT_{53}	—	January 9, 2002	Socorro	LINEAR	·	970 m	MPC · JPL
276025	2002 AV_{54}	—	January 9, 2002	Socorro	LINEAR	·	2.4 km	MPC · JPL
276026	2002 AX_{61}	—	January 11, 2002	Socorro	LINEAR	RAF	1.6 km	MPC · JPL
276027	2002 AJ_{67}	—	January 9, 2002	Campo Imperatore	CINEOS	·	1.5 km	MPC · JPL
276028	2002 AC_{73}	—	January 8, 2002	Socorro	LINEAR	·	1.4 km	MPC · JPL
276029	2002 AF_{75}	—	January 8, 2002	Socorro	LINEAR	·	2.3 km	MPC · JPL
276030	2002 AD_{77}	—	January 8, 2002	Socorro	LINEAR	·	1.5 km	MPC · JPL
276031	2002 AJ_{104}	—	January 9, 2002	Socorro	LINEAR	·	1.4 km	MPC · JPL
276032	2002 AT_{107}	—	January 9, 2002	Socorro	LINEAR	·	1.9 km	MPC · JPL
276033	2002 AJ_{129}	—	January 15, 2002	Haleakala	NEAT	APO · PHA	630 m	MPC · JPL
276034	2002 AA_{130}	—	January 15, 2002	Kingsnake	J. V. McClusky	·	2.3 km	MPC · JPL
276035	2002 AB_{140}	—	January 13, 2002	Socorro	LINEAR	HNS	1.7 km	MPC · JPL
276036	2002 AJ_{140}	—	January 13, 2002	Socorro	LINEAR	·	2.2 km	MPC · JPL
276037	2002 AA_{147}	—	January 14, 2002	Socorro	LINEAR	·	1.5 km	MPC · JPL
276038	2002 AE_{150}	—	January 14, 2002	Socorro	LINEAR	·	2.1 km	MPC · JPL
276039	2002 AT_{153}	—	January 14, 2002	Socorro	LINEAR	EUN	1.6 km	MPC · JPL
276040	2002 AE_{157}	—	January 13, 2002	Socorro	LINEAR	·	1.7 km	MPC · JPL
276041	2002 AV_{162}	—	January 13, 2002	Socorro	LINEAR	·	1.6 km	MPC · JPL
276042	2002 AQ_{174}	—	January 14, 2002	Socorro	LINEAR	·	1.3 km	MPC · JPL
276043	2002 AL_{209}	—	January 5, 2002	Kitt Peak	Spacewatch	·	2.7 km	MPC · JPL
276044	2002 BD_{5}	—	January 19, 2002	Anderson Mesa	LONEOS	EUN	1.4 km	MPC · JPL
276045	2002 BS_{22}	—	January 23, 2002	Socorro	LINEAR	·	2.9 km	MPC · JPL
276046	2002 BG_{27}	—	January 19, 2002	Anderson Mesa	LONEOS	·	4.8 km	MPC · JPL
276047	2002 CX_{5}	—	February 4, 2002	Haleakala	NEAT	·	1.8 km	MPC · JPL
276048	2002 CP_{7}	—	February 6, 2002	Desert Eagle	W. K. Y. Yeung	·	1.9 km	MPC · JPL
276049	2002 CE_{26}	—	February 10, 2002	Socorro	LINEAR	APO +1km · moon	3.5 km	MPC · JPL
276050	2002 CU_{30}	—	February 6, 2002	Socorro	LINEAR	·	1.5 km	MPC · JPL
276051	2002 CZ_{30}	—	February 6, 2002	Socorro	LINEAR	(5)	1.9 km	MPC · JPL
276052	2002 CB_{32}	—	February 6, 2002	Socorro	LINEAR	·	1.9 km	MPC · JPL
276053	2002 CS_{32}	—	February 6, 2002	Socorro	LINEAR	·	2.0 km	MPC · JPL
276054	2002 CH_{33}	—	February 6, 2002	Socorro	LINEAR	·	2.6 km	MPC · JPL
276055	2002 CP_{37}	—	February 7, 2002	Socorro	LINEAR	·	2.6 km	MPC · JPL
276056	2002 CL_{48}	—	February 3, 2002	Haleakala	NEAT	(5)	1.5 km	MPC · JPL
276057	2002 CX_{62}	—	February 6, 2002	Socorro	LINEAR	·	3.1 km	MPC · JPL
276058	2002 CJ_{70}	—	February 7, 2002	Socorro	LINEAR	·	1.8 km	MPC · JPL
276059	2002 CP_{74}	—	February 7, 2002	Socorro	LINEAR	·	1.7 km	MPC · JPL
276060	2002 CJ_{80}	—	February 7, 2002	Socorro	LINEAR	·	1.8 km	MPC · JPL
276061	2002 CD_{99}	—	February 7, 2002	Socorro	LINEAR	DOR	3.4 km	MPC · JPL
276062	2002 CH_{113}	—	February 8, 2002	Socorro	LINEAR	·	2.6 km	MPC · JPL
276063	2002 CY_{120}	—	February 7, 2002	Socorro	LINEAR	·	1.2 km	MPC · JPL
276064	2002 CO_{124}	—	February 7, 2002	Socorro	LINEAR	AEG	3.7 km	MPC · JPL
276065	2002 CV_{130}	—	February 7, 2002	Socorro	LINEAR	·	1.8 km	MPC · JPL
276066	2002 CX_{139}	—	February 8, 2002	Socorro	LINEAR	·	1.9 km	MPC · JPL
276067	2002 CT_{145}	—	February 9, 2002	Socorro	LINEAR	·	3.0 km	MPC · JPL
276068	2002 CE_{162}	—	February 8, 2002	Socorro	LINEAR	·	3.0 km	MPC · JPL
276069	2002 CT_{171}	—	February 8, 2002	Socorro	LINEAR	·	2.1 km	MPC · JPL
276070	2002 CX_{179}	—	February 10, 2002	Socorro	LINEAR	·	2.9 km	MPC · JPL
276071	2002 CU_{182}	—	February 10, 2002	Socorro	LINEAR	·	2.2 km	MPC · JPL
276072	2002 CY_{183}	—	February 10, 2002	Socorro	LINEAR	·	2.4 km	MPC · JPL
276073	2002 CQ_{190}	—	February 10, 2002	Socorro	LINEAR	·	1.7 km	MPC · JPL
276074	2002 CT_{204}	—	February 10, 2002	Socorro	LINEAR	·	1.8 km	MPC · JPL
276075	2002 CK_{216}	—	February 10, 2002	Socorro	LINEAR	·	3.1 km	MPC · JPL
276076	2002 CO_{217}	—	February 10, 2002	Socorro	LINEAR	(29841)	2.4 km	MPC · JPL
276077	2002 CJ_{221}	—	February 10, 2002	Socorro	LINEAR	·	2.1 km	MPC · JPL
276078	2002 CR_{224}	—	February 11, 2002	Socorro	LINEAR	·	2.0 km	MPC · JPL
276079	2002 CV_{263}	—	February 7, 2002	Kitt Peak	M. W. Buie	·	1.4 km	MPC · JPL
276080	2002 CZ_{269}	—	February 7, 2002	Kitt Peak	Spacewatch	·	1.7 km	MPC · JPL
276081	2002 CG_{270}	—	February 7, 2002	Kitt Peak	Spacewatch	·	3.0 km	MPC · JPL
276082	2002 CR_{271}	—	February 8, 2002	Kitt Peak	Spacewatch	·	1.3 km	MPC · JPL
276083	2002 CA_{289}	—	February 10, 2002	Socorro	LINEAR	·	2.0 km	MPC · JPL
276084	2002 CF_{294}	—	February 10, 2002	Socorro	LINEAR	MAR	1.8 km	MPC · JPL
276085	2002 CX_{296}	—	February 10, 2002	Socorro	LINEAR	·	2.0 km	MPC · JPL
276086	2002 CG_{302}	—	February 12, 2002	Socorro	LINEAR	·	1.9 km	MPC · JPL
276087	2002 CY_{310}	—	February 10, 2002	Socorro	LINEAR	MIS	1.9 km	MPC · JPL
276088	2002 DG_{9}	—	February 19, 2002	Socorro	LINEAR	EUN	1.7 km	MPC · JPL
276089	2002 DM_{11}	—	February 20, 2002	Socorro	LINEAR	·	3.1 km	MPC · JPL
276090	2002 DH_{15}	—	February 16, 2002	Palomar	NEAT	·	1.5 km	MPC · JPL
276091	2002 DQ_{18}	—	February 22, 2002	Palomar	NEAT	·	2.7 km	MPC · JPL
276092	2002 DU_{18}	—	February 19, 2002	Socorro	LINEAR	ADE	3.2 km	MPC · JPL
276093	2002 EK	—	March 3, 2002	Socorro	LINEAR	BAR	2.7 km	MPC · JPL
276094	2002 EQ_{10}	—	March 13, 2002	Palomar	NEAT	·	1.7 km	MPC · JPL
276095	2002 ER_{10}	—	March 13, 2002	Palomar	NEAT	·	2.4 km	MPC · JPL
276096	2002 EE_{32}	—	March 9, 2002	Palomar	NEAT	·	3.4 km	MPC · JPL
276097	2002 EZ_{47}	—	March 12, 2002	Palomar	NEAT	MIS	2.9 km	MPC · JPL
276098	2002 EP_{55}	—	March 13, 2002	Socorro	LINEAR	·	1.8 km	MPC · JPL
276099	2002 EO_{68}	—	March 13, 2002	Socorro	LINEAR	·	2.1 km	MPC · JPL
276100	2002 EG_{74}	—	March 13, 2002	Socorro	LINEAR	·	2.6 km	MPC · JPL

== 276101–276200 ==
back to top

Designation			Discovery			Properties		Ref
Permanent	Provisional	Named after	Date	Site	Discoverer(s)	Category	Diam.	Ref
276101	2002 EN_{100}	—	March 5, 2002	Palomar	NEAT	·	2.5 km	MPC · JPL
276102	2002 ET_{105}	—	March 9, 2002	Anderson Mesa	LONEOS	·	1.7 km	MPC · JPL
276103	2002 EW_{128}	—	March 13, 2002	Socorro	LINEAR	·	2.2 km	MPC · JPL
276104	2002 ES_{149}	—	March 15, 2002	Palomar	NEAT	·	2.7 km	MPC · JPL
276105	2002 EW_{157}	—	March 13, 2002	Palomar	NEAT	·	1.4 km	MPC · JPL
276106	2002 FQ_{25}	—	March 19, 2002	Palomar	NEAT	·	2.6 km	MPC · JPL
276107	2002 FE_{34}	—	March 20, 2002	Socorro	LINEAR	·	2.1 km	MPC · JPL
276108	2002 FN_{35}	—	March 21, 2002	Anderson Mesa	LONEOS	EUN	1.7 km	MPC · JPL
276109	2002 GL_{5}	—	April 10, 2002	Socorro	LINEAR	·	2.5 km	MPC · JPL
276110	2002 GO_{6}	—	April 9, 2002	Socorro	LINEAR	H	930 m	MPC · JPL
276111	2002 GM_{9}	—	April 12, 2002	Palomar	NEAT	AMO	680 m	MPC · JPL
276112	2002 GP_{10}	—	April 8, 2002	Bergisch Gladbach	W. Bickel	·	2.5 km	MPC · JPL
276113	2002 GB_{37}	—	April 2, 2002	Palomar	NEAT	·	1.7 km	MPC · JPL
276114	2002 GZ_{47}	—	March 20, 2002	Kitt Peak	Spacewatch	WIT	1.3 km	MPC · JPL
276115	2002 GA_{50}	—	April 5, 2002	Palomar	NEAT	EUN	1.8 km	MPC · JPL
276116	2002 GD_{59}	—	April 8, 2002	Palomar	NEAT	·	2.2 km	MPC · JPL
276117	2002 GC_{62}	—	April 8, 2002	Palomar	NEAT	·	2.0 km	MPC · JPL
276118	2002 GC_{65}	—	April 6, 2002	Kitt Peak	Spacewatch	·	1.9 km	MPC · JPL
276119	2002 GF_{73}	—	April 9, 2002	Anderson Mesa	LONEOS	EUN	1.6 km	MPC · JPL
276120	2002 GR_{79}	—	April 10, 2002	Palomar	NEAT	·	4.0 km	MPC · JPL
276121	2002 GK_{80}	—	April 10, 2002	Socorro	LINEAR	·	2.0 km	MPC · JPL
276122	2002 GW_{81}	—	April 10, 2002	Socorro	LINEAR	PHO	2.0 km	MPC · JPL
276123	2002 GA_{83}	—	April 10, 2002	Socorro	LINEAR	·	4.1 km	MPC · JPL
276124	2002 GG_{85}	—	April 10, 2002	Socorro	LINEAR	·	2.4 km	MPC · JPL
276125	2002 GT_{99}	—	April 10, 2002	Socorro	LINEAR	·	2.2 km	MPC · JPL
276126	2002 GK_{102}	—	April 10, 2002	Socorro	LINEAR	·	2.6 km	MPC · JPL
276127	2002 GL_{102}	—	April 10, 2002	Socorro	LINEAR	·	3.3 km	MPC · JPL
276128	2002 GZ_{105}	—	April 11, 2002	Anderson Mesa	LONEOS	·	3.0 km	MPC · JPL
276129	2002 GM_{119}	—	April 12, 2002	Palomar	NEAT	·	2.8 km	MPC · JPL
276130	2002 GW_{120}	—	April 12, 2002	Kitt Peak	Spacewatch	·	1.3 km	MPC · JPL
276131	2002 GD_{125}	—	April 12, 2002	Socorro	LINEAR	H	750 m	MPC · JPL
276132	2002 GB_{146}	—	April 12, 2002	Kitt Peak	Spacewatch	·	3.0 km	MPC · JPL
276133	2002 GV_{149}	—	April 14, 2002	Socorro	LINEAR	·	2.0 km	MPC · JPL
276134	2002 GF_{153}	—	April 12, 2002	Palomar	NEAT	GEF	1.7 km	MPC · JPL
276135	2002 GV_{153}	—	April 12, 2002	Palomar	NEAT	·	2.7 km	MPC · JPL
276136	2002 GJ_{155}	—	April 13, 2002	Palomar	NEAT	·	2.2 km	MPC · JPL
276137	2002 GO_{164}	—	April 14, 2002	Palomar	NEAT	MRX	1.4 km	MPC · JPL
276138	2002 GG_{180}	—	April 8, 2002	Palomar	NEAT	AST	2.1 km	MPC · JPL
276139	2002 HY_{6}	—	April 18, 2002	Haleakala	NEAT	·	2.1 km	MPC · JPL
276140	2002 HB_{8}	—	April 21, 2002	Palomar	NEAT	HNS	1.8 km	MPC · JPL
276141	2002 HF_{10}	—	April 17, 2002	Socorro	LINEAR	·	3.0 km	MPC · JPL
276142	2002 HR_{13}	—	April 26, 2002	Haleakala	NEAT	·	2.7 km	MPC · JPL
276143	2002 JP_{5}	—	May 5, 2002	Palomar	NEAT	EUN	1.8 km	MPC · JPL
276144	2002 JY_{19}	—	May 7, 2002	Palomar	NEAT	EUN	1.6 km	MPC · JPL
276145	2002 JO_{38}	—	May 9, 2002	Palomar	NEAT	CLO	2.3 km	MPC · JPL
276146	2002 JP_{74}	—	May 9, 2002	Socorro	LINEAR	·	2.0 km	MPC · JPL
276147	2002 JO_{75}	—	May 9, 2002	Socorro	LINEAR	·	3.6 km	MPC · JPL
276148	2002 JQ_{80}	—	May 11, 2002	Socorro	LINEAR	·	2.8 km	MPC · JPL
276149	2002 JL_{99}	—	May 13, 2002	Palomar	NEAT	·	3.0 km	MPC · JPL
276150	2002 JP_{99}	—	May 13, 2002	Palomar	NEAT	·	3.1 km	MPC · JPL
276151	2002 JE_{112}	—	May 11, 2002	Socorro	LINEAR	·	2.7 km	MPC · JPL
276152	2002 JX_{124}	—	May 6, 2002	Palomar	NEAT	·	2.7 km	MPC · JPL
276153	2002 JY_{140}	—	May 10, 2002	Kitt Peak	Spacewatch	·	2.5 km	MPC · JPL
276154	2002 JW_{144}	—	May 13, 2002	Palomar	NEAT	EUN	1.9 km	MPC · JPL
276155	2002 KW_{12}	—	May 17, 2002	Haleakala	NEAT	·	1.9 km	MPC · JPL
276156	2002 LL_{1}	—	June 2, 2002	Palomar	NEAT	NEM	3.1 km	MPC · JPL
276157	2002 LK_{16}	—	June 6, 2002	Socorro	LINEAR	·	1.7 km	MPC · JPL
276158	2002 LE_{44}	—	June 10, 2002	Palomar	NEAT	·	3.8 km	MPC · JPL
276159	2002 LU_{46}	—	June 12, 2002	Socorro	LINEAR	·	4.3 km	MPC · JPL
276160	2002 LT_{51}	—	June 9, 2002	Socorro	LINEAR	·	3.2 km	MPC · JPL
276161	2002 LA_{53}	—	June 8, 2002	Socorro	LINEAR	·	1.2 km	MPC · JPL
276162	2002 LV_{61}	—	June 1, 2002	Palomar	NEAT	EOS	2.5 km	MPC · JPL
276163 Tafreshi	2002 LV_{62}	Tafreshi	June 13, 2002	Palomar	NEAT	·	2.9 km	MPC · JPL
276164	2002 NF_{60}	—	July 14, 2002	Palomar	NEAT	·	2.8 km	MPC · JPL
276165	2002 NN_{69}	—	September 26, 2008	Kitt Peak	Spacewatch	·	2.6 km	MPC · JPL
276166	2002 OW_{4}	—	July 17, 2002	Palomar	NEAT	BRA	2.1 km	MPC · JPL
276167	2002 ON_{5}	—	July 20, 2002	Palomar	NEAT	·	3.2 km	MPC · JPL
276168	2002 OU_{21}	—	July 21, 2002	Palomar	NEAT	·	870 m	MPC · JPL
276169	2002 OZ_{32}	—	July 29, 2002	Palomar	NEAT	·	4.4 km	MPC · JPL
276170	2002 ON_{34}	—	October 17, 2003	Kitt Peak	Spacewatch	EOS	2.6 km	MPC · JPL
276171	2002 PG_{17}	—	August 6, 2002	Palomar	NEAT	·	2.1 km	MPC · JPL
276172	2002 PD_{35}	—	August 6, 2002	Palomar	NEAT	·	5.1 km	MPC · JPL
276173	2002 PM_{81}	—	August 13, 2002	Palomar	NEAT	·	2.6 km	MPC · JPL
276174	2002 PE_{102}	—	August 12, 2002	Socorro	LINEAR	·	900 m	MPC · JPL
276175	2002 PF_{106}	—	August 12, 2002	Socorro	LINEAR	VER	3.5 km	MPC · JPL
276176	2002 PA_{107}	—	August 12, 2002	Socorro	LINEAR	·	4.3 km	MPC · JPL
276177	2002 PT_{107}	—	August 13, 2002	Palomar	NEAT	·	2.8 km	MPC · JPL
276178	2002 PQ_{109}	—	August 13, 2002	Anderson Mesa	LONEOS	EOS	2.0 km	MPC · JPL
276179	2002 PN_{118}	—	August 13, 2002	Anderson Mesa	LONEOS	·	750 m	MPC · JPL
276180	2002 PV_{119}	—	August 13, 2002	Anderson Mesa	LONEOS	·	5.4 km	MPC · JPL
276181	2002 PU_{123}	—	August 13, 2002	Anderson Mesa	LONEOS	·	4.7 km	MPC · JPL
276182	2002 PK_{151}	—	August 8, 2002	Palomar	NEAT	EOS	2.4 km	MPC · JPL
276183	2002 PX_{160}	—	August 8, 2002	Palomar	S. F. Hönig	·	2.7 km	MPC · JPL
276184	2002 PU_{162}	—	August 8, 2002	Palomar	S. F. Hönig	·	1.3 km	MPC · JPL
276185	2002 PF_{171}	—	August 11, 2002	Palomar	NEAT	·	4.1 km	MPC · JPL
276186	2002 PX_{178}	—	August 14, 2002	Socorro	LINEAR	·	5.4 km	MPC · JPL
276187	2002 PD_{180}	—	August 8, 2002	Palomar	NEAT	·	2.3 km	MPC · JPL
276188	2002 PK_{186}	—	August 11, 2002	Palomar	NEAT	·	1.9 km	MPC · JPL
276189	2002 PO_{189}	—	August 8, 2002	Palomar	NEAT	·	2.8 km	MPC · JPL
276190	2002 PN_{192}	—	August 7, 2002	Palomar	NEAT	·	2.8 km	MPC · JPL
276191	2002 PU_{193}	—	March 7, 2001	Haleakala	NEAT	PHO	1.6 km	MPC · JPL
276192	2002 PT_{195}	—	September 6, 2008	Mount Lemmon	Mount Lemmon Survey	·	2.5 km	MPC · JPL
276193	2002 QN_{3}	—	August 16, 2002	Palomar	NEAT	·	790 m	MPC · JPL
276194	2002 QA_{13}	—	August 26, 2002	Palomar	NEAT	·	2.4 km	MPC · JPL
276195	2002 QT_{19}	—	August 28, 2002	Palomar	NEAT	·	3.7 km	MPC · JPL
276196	2002 QJ_{24}	—	August 28, 2002	Palomar	NEAT	·	3.4 km	MPC · JPL
276197	2002 QF_{28}	—	August 28, 2002	Palomar	NEAT	·	1.0 km	MPC · JPL
276198	2002 QY_{28}	—	August 29, 2002	Palomar	NEAT	·	1.0 km	MPC · JPL
276199	2002 QN_{51}	—	August 29, 2002	Palomar	S. F. Hönig	·	2.6 km	MPC · JPL
276200	2002 QZ_{52}	—	August 29, 2002	Palomar	S. F. Hönig	·	2.3 km	MPC · JPL

== 276201–276300 ==
back to top

Designation			Discovery			Properties		Ref
Permanent	Provisional	Named after	Date	Site	Discoverer(s)	Category	Diam.	Ref
276201	2002 QD_{57}	—	August 17, 2002	Palomar	Lowe, A.	·	2.9 km	MPC · JPL
276202	2002 QK_{57}	—	August 17, 2002	Palomar	Lowe, A.	·	2.7 km	MPC · JPL
276203	2002 QS_{65}	—	August 29, 2002	Palomar	NEAT	·	3.2 km	MPC · JPL
276204	2002 QT_{66}	—	August 29, 2002	Palomar	NEAT	·	720 m	MPC · JPL
276205	2002 QZ_{70}	—	August 17, 2002	Palomar	NEAT	BRA	1.6 km	MPC · JPL
276206	2002 QF_{71}	—	August 18, 2002	Palomar	NEAT	·	3.2 km	MPC · JPL
276207	2002 QN_{73}	—	August 30, 2002	Palomar	NEAT	·	4.7 km	MPC · JPL
276208	2002 QD_{74}	—	August 30, 2002	Palomar	NEAT	·	4.0 km	MPC · JPL
276209	2002 QB_{79}	—	August 17, 2002	Palomar	NEAT	·	3.1 km	MPC · JPL
276210	2002 QU_{83}	—	August 17, 2002	Palomar	NEAT	·	900 m	MPC · JPL
276211	2002 QG_{87}	—	August 29, 2002	Palomar	NEAT	·	730 m	MPC · JPL
276212	2002 QA_{93}	—	August 30, 2002	Palomar	NEAT	·	780 m	MPC · JPL
276213	2002 QG_{94}	—	August 26, 2002	Palomar	NEAT	EOS	2.0 km	MPC · JPL
276214	2002 QW_{99}	—	August 18, 2002	Palomar	NEAT	·	3.0 km	MPC · JPL
276215	2002 QG_{110}	—	August 17, 2002	Palomar	NEAT	·	2.7 km	MPC · JPL
276216	2002 QR_{110}	—	August 17, 2002	Palomar	NEAT	·	910 m	MPC · JPL
276217	2002 QB_{111}	—	August 17, 2002	Palomar	NEAT	·	2.6 km	MPC · JPL
276218	2002 QX_{112}	—	August 27, 2002	Palomar	NEAT	·	910 m	MPC · JPL
276219	2002 QL_{117}	—	August 16, 2002	Palomar	NEAT	·	3.2 km	MPC · JPL
276220	2002 QZ_{121}	—	August 16, 2002	Palomar	NEAT	·	3.2 km	MPC · JPL
276221	2002 QD_{122}	—	August 16, 2002	Palomar	NEAT	EOS	2.1 km	MPC · JPL
276222	2002 QO_{123}	—	August 18, 2002	Palomar	NEAT	HOF	2.9 km	MPC · JPL
276223	2002 QD_{126}	—	August 19, 2002	Palomar	NEAT	·	3.0 km	MPC · JPL
276224	2002 QQ_{126}	—	August 19, 2002	Palomar	NEAT	·	3.3 km	MPC · JPL
276225	2002 QB_{130}	—	August 17, 2002	Palomar	NEAT	·	1.1 km	MPC · JPL
276226	2002 QQ_{130}	—	August 30, 2002	Palomar	NEAT	EOS	2.5 km	MPC · JPL
276227	2002 QG_{131}	—	August 30, 2002	Palomar	NEAT	·	3.3 km	MPC · JPL
276228	2002 QW_{135}	—	August 30, 2002	Palomar	NEAT	·	2.8 km	MPC · JPL
276229	2002 QX_{140}	—	November 20, 2003	Kitt Peak	Spacewatch	·	2.8 km	MPC · JPL
276230	2002 QY_{141}	—	April 8, 2006	Kitt Peak	Spacewatch	·	2.5 km	MPC · JPL
276231	2002 QQ_{143}	—	September 17, 2006	Kitt Peak	Spacewatch	MAS	740 m	MPC · JPL
276232	2002 QH_{145}	—	September 29, 1997	Kitt Peak	Spacewatch	·	3.3 km	MPC · JPL
276233	2002 RE_{30}	—	September 4, 2002	Anderson Mesa	LONEOS	·	1.3 km	MPC · JPL
276234	2002 RC_{31}	—	September 4, 2002	Anderson Mesa	LONEOS	·	810 m	MPC · JPL
276235	2002 RP_{38}	—	September 5, 2002	Anderson Mesa	LONEOS	·	930 m	MPC · JPL
276236	2002 RF_{55}	—	September 5, 2002	Anderson Mesa	LONEOS	·	1 km	MPC · JPL
276237	2002 RH_{56}	—	September 5, 2002	Anderson Mesa	LONEOS	(2076)	880 m	MPC · JPL
276238	2002 RV_{66}	—	September 3, 2002	Palomar	NEAT	·	1.3 km	MPC · JPL
276239	2002 RZ_{77}	—	September 5, 2002	Socorro	LINEAR	·	1.3 km	MPC · JPL
276240	2002 RR_{91}	—	September 5, 2002	Socorro	LINEAR	·	800 m	MPC · JPL
276241	2002 RV_{95}	—	September 5, 2002	Socorro	LINEAR	·	1.3 km	MPC · JPL
276242	2002 RM_{112}	—	September 5, 2002	Socorro	LINEAR	·	2.4 km	MPC · JPL
276243	2002 RG_{117}	—	September 7, 2002	Ondřejov	P. Pravec, P. Kušnirák	·	780 m	MPC · JPL
276244	2002 RM_{130}	—	September 10, 2002	Palomar	NEAT	TIR	3.3 km	MPC · JPL
276245	2002 RB_{155}	—	September 11, 2002	Palomar	NEAT	·	3.2 km	MPC · JPL
276246	2002 RJ_{155}	—	September 11, 2002	Palomar	NEAT	EOS	2.4 km	MPC · JPL
276247	2002 RE_{176}	—	September 7, 2002	Socorro	LINEAR	·	960 m	MPC · JPL
276248	2002 RX_{191}	—	September 12, 2002	Palomar	NEAT	·	1.1 km	MPC · JPL
276249	2002 RF_{192}	—	September 12, 2002	Palomar	NEAT	·	1.5 km	MPC · JPL
276250	2002 RJ_{195}	—	September 12, 2002	Palomar	NEAT	·	780 m	MPC · JPL
276251	2002 RG_{203}	—	September 13, 2002	Palomar	NEAT	·	950 m	MPC · JPL
276252	2002 RL_{213}	—	September 13, 2002	Palomar	NEAT	·	3.2 km	MPC · JPL
276253	2002 RO_{214}	—	September 13, 2002	Socorro	LINEAR	·	1.1 km	MPC · JPL
276254	2002 RB_{217}	—	September 14, 2002	Palomar	NEAT	·	720 m	MPC · JPL
276255	2002 RM_{225}	—	September 13, 2002	Palomar	NEAT	EUP	5.5 km	MPC · JPL
276256	2002 RU_{225}	—	September 13, 2002	Palomar	NEAT	·	830 m	MPC · JPL
276257	2002 RH_{242}	—	September 13, 2002	Palomar	R. Matson	·	3.7 km	MPC · JPL
276258	2002 RT_{244}	—	September 12, 2002	Palomar	NEAT	MAS	690 m	MPC · JPL
276259	2002 RV_{252}	—	September 14, 2002	Palomar	NEAT	·	600 m	MPC · JPL
276260	2002 RD_{271}	—	September 4, 2002	Palomar	NEAT	·	3.0 km	MPC · JPL
276261	2002 RH_{274}	—	September 4, 2002	Palomar	NEAT	·	1.8 km	MPC · JPL
276262	2002 RV_{274}	—	September 4, 2002	Palomar	NEAT	HYG	3.8 km	MPC · JPL
276263	2002 RT_{277}	—	September 4, 2002	Palomar	NEAT	EOS	2.5 km	MPC · JPL
276264	2002 RW_{278}	—	September 12, 2002	Palomar	NEAT	·	2.2 km	MPC · JPL
276265	2002 RE_{280}	—	September 14, 2002	Palomar	NEAT	·	3.5 km	MPC · JPL
276266	2002 RQ_{282}	—	September 15, 2002	Palomar	NEAT	·	3.1 km	MPC · JPL
276267	2002 SG_{8}	—	September 27, 2002	Palomar	NEAT	EOS	2.6 km	MPC · JPL
276268	2002 SH_{9}	—	September 27, 2002	Palomar	NEAT	THM	2.9 km	MPC · JPL
276269	2002 SU_{18}	—	September 26, 2002	Palomar	NEAT	·	1.3 km	MPC · JPL
276270	2002 SZ_{23}	—	September 27, 2002	Socorro	LINEAR	·	4.5 km	MPC · JPL
276271	2002 SX_{28}	—	September 28, 2002	Haleakala	NEAT	·	4.1 km	MPC · JPL
276272	2002 SG_{33}	—	September 28, 2002	Haleakala	NEAT	·	3.5 km	MPC · JPL
276273	2002 SR_{33}	—	September 28, 2002	Haleakala	NEAT	·	900 m	MPC · JPL
276274	2002 SS_{41}	—	September 30, 2002	Haleakala	NEAT	T_{j} (2.99)	1.5 km	MPC · JPL
276275	2002 SA_{58}	—	September 30, 2002	Haleakala	NEAT	·	1.2 km	MPC · JPL
276276	2002 SX_{60}	—	September 16, 2002	Palomar	NEAT	·	1.1 km	MPC · JPL
276277	2002 SL_{65}	—	September 27, 2002	Palomar	NEAT	EUP	5.1 km	MPC · JPL
276278	2002 SF_{66}	—	September 16, 2002	Palomar	NEAT	·	950 m	MPC · JPL
276279	2002 SH_{72}	—	September 16, 2002	Palomar	NEAT	·	2.9 km	MPC · JPL
276280	2002 TO_{1}	—	October 1, 2002	Anderson Mesa	LONEOS	·	980 m	MPC · JPL
276281	2002 TN_{3}	—	October 1, 2002	Anderson Mesa	LONEOS	NYS	1.0 km	MPC · JPL
276282	2002 TN_{8}	—	October 1, 2002	Haleakala	NEAT	·	2.4 km	MPC · JPL
276283	2002 TQ_{12}	—	October 1, 2002	Anderson Mesa	LONEOS	·	2.1 km	MPC · JPL
276284	2002 TE_{16}	—	October 2, 2002	Socorro	LINEAR	HIL · 3:2 · (3561)	5.9 km	MPC · JPL
276285	2002 TB_{19}	—	October 2, 2002	Socorro	LINEAR	·	820 m	MPC · JPL
276286	2002 TG_{19}	—	October 2, 2002	Socorro	LINEAR	NYS	1.3 km	MPC · JPL
276287	2002 TU_{20}	—	October 2, 2002	Socorro	LINEAR	·	1.1 km	MPC · JPL
276288	2002 TS_{30}	—	October 2, 2002	Socorro	LINEAR	·	1.4 km	MPC · JPL
276289	2002 TH_{37}	—	October 2, 2002	Socorro	LINEAR	·	780 m	MPC · JPL
276290	2002 TW_{45}	—	October 2, 2002	Socorro	LINEAR	·	1.3 km	MPC · JPL
276291	2002 TL_{59}	—	October 3, 2002	Palomar	NEAT	H	720 m	MPC · JPL
276292	2002 TW_{76}	—	October 1, 2002	Anderson Mesa	LONEOS	·	2.1 km	MPC · JPL
276293	2002 TZ_{90}	—	October 3, 2002	Palomar	NEAT	·	960 m	MPC · JPL
276294	2002 TD_{91}	—	October 3, 2002	Palomar	NEAT	EMA	5.9 km	MPC · JPL
276295	2002 TV_{95}	—	October 3, 2002	Palomar	NEAT	·	890 m	MPC · JPL
276296	2002 TA_{96}	—	October 3, 2002	Palomar	NEAT	·	1.1 km	MPC · JPL
276297	2002 TZ_{96}	—	October 1, 2002	Haleakala	NEAT	·	850 m	MPC · JPL
276298	2002 TR_{102}	—	October 4, 2002	Socorro	LINEAR	(2076)	880 m	MPC · JPL
276299	2002 TC_{117}	—	October 3, 2002	Palomar	NEAT	·	1.0 km	MPC · JPL
276300	2002 TP_{118}	—	October 3, 2002	Palomar	NEAT	DOR	3.6 km	MPC · JPL

== 276301–276400 ==
back to top

Designation			Discovery			Properties		Ref
Permanent	Provisional	Named after	Date	Site	Discoverer(s)	Category	Diam.	Ref
276301	2002 TQ_{120}	—	October 3, 2002	Palomar	NEAT	·	1.3 km	MPC · JPL
276302	2002 TN_{122}	—	October 4, 2002	Palomar	NEAT	·	1.3 km	MPC · JPL
276303	2002 TU_{122}	—	October 4, 2002	Palomar	NEAT	·	3.5 km	MPC · JPL
276304	2002 TK_{131}	—	October 4, 2002	Socorro	LINEAR	NAE	4.8 km	MPC · JPL
276305	2002 TB_{140}	—	October 13, 2002	Powell	Powell	·	4.8 km	MPC · JPL
276306	2002 TG_{145}	—	October 3, 2002	Socorro	LINEAR	·	2.3 km	MPC · JPL
276307	2002 TB_{146}	—	October 4, 2002	Socorro	LINEAR	·	1.0 km	MPC · JPL
276308	2002 TT_{157}	—	October 5, 2002	Palomar	NEAT	EOS	2.5 km	MPC · JPL
276309	2002 TC_{159}	—	October 5, 2002	Palomar	NEAT	·	3.8 km	MPC · JPL
276310	2002 TG_{160}	—	October 5, 2002	Palomar	NEAT	·	4.0 km	MPC · JPL
276311	2002 TK_{160}	—	October 5, 2002	Palomar	NEAT	·	4.2 km	MPC · JPL
276312	2002 TP_{165}	—	October 3, 2002	Palomar	NEAT	·	6.4 km	MPC · JPL
276313	2002 TZ_{166}	—	October 3, 2002	Palomar	NEAT	·	2.1 km	MPC · JPL
276314	2002 TG_{169}	—	October 3, 2002	Palomar	NEAT	·	3.1 km	MPC · JPL
276315	2002 TJ_{171}	—	October 3, 2002	Palomar	NEAT	·	3.6 km	MPC · JPL
276316	2002 TQ_{174}	—	October 4, 2002	Socorro	LINEAR	·	1.0 km	MPC · JPL
276317	2002 TV_{178}	—	October 12, 2002	Socorro	LINEAR	·	4.7 km	MPC · JPL
276318	2002 TN_{180}	—	October 14, 2002	Socorro	LINEAR	·	3.6 km	MPC · JPL
276319	2002 TJ_{187}	—	October 4, 2002	Socorro	LINEAR	TIR	3.4 km	MPC · JPL
276320	2002 TY_{195}	—	October 3, 2002	Socorro	LINEAR	·	1.1 km	MPC · JPL
276321	2002 TN_{197}	—	October 4, 2002	Socorro	LINEAR	·	960 m	MPC · JPL
276322	2002 TC_{205}	—	October 4, 2002	Socorro	LINEAR	fast	1.2 km	MPC · JPL
276323	2002 TR_{205}	—	October 4, 2002	Socorro	LINEAR	·	6.5 km	MPC · JPL
276324	2002 TL_{208}	—	October 4, 2002	Socorro	LINEAR	·	1.4 km	MPC · JPL
276325	2002 TJ_{212}	—	October 7, 2002	Haleakala	NEAT	EOS	2.5 km	MPC · JPL
276326	2002 TH_{217}	—	October 6, 2002	Palomar	NEAT	·	1.3 km	MPC · JPL
276327	2002 TE_{242}	—	October 9, 2002	Anderson Mesa	LONEOS	·	2.0 km	MPC · JPL
276328	2002 TY_{249}	—	October 7, 2002	Kitt Peak	Spacewatch	EOS	2.6 km	MPC · JPL
276329	2002 TM_{251}	—	October 7, 2002	Haleakala	NEAT	HYG	3.5 km	MPC · JPL
276330	2002 TH_{253}	—	October 8, 2002	Kitt Peak	Spacewatch	MAR	970 m	MPC · JPL
276331	2002 TL_{255}	—	October 9, 2002	Socorro	LINEAR	·	1.7 km	MPC · JPL
276332	2002 TD_{259}	—	October 9, 2002	Socorro	LINEAR	slow	4.4 km	MPC · JPL
276333	2002 TJ_{265}	—	October 10, 2002	Kitt Peak	Spacewatch	·	850 m	MPC · JPL
276334	2002 TS_{271}	—	October 9, 2002	Socorro	LINEAR	·	6.5 km	MPC · JPL
276335	2002 TP_{298}	—	October 12, 2002	Socorro	LINEAR	·	1.3 km	MPC · JPL
276336	2002 TY_{305}	—	October 4, 2002	Apache Point	SDSS	·	3.7 km	MPC · JPL
276337	2002 TK_{309}	—	October 4, 2002	Apache Point	SDSS	ELF	4.0 km	MPC · JPL
276338	2002 TJ_{314}	—	October 4, 2002	Apache Point	SDSS	·	4.5 km	MPC · JPL
276339	2002 TN_{326}	—	October 5, 2002	Apache Point	SDSS	·	2.7 km	MPC · JPL
276340	2002 TF_{328}	—	October 5, 2002	Apache Point	SDSS	·	4.7 km	MPC · JPL
276341	2002 TY_{346}	—	October 5, 2002	Apache Point	SDSS	·	3.8 km	MPC · JPL
276342	2002 TM_{350}	—	October 10, 2002	Apache Point	SDSS	·	4.0 km	MPC · JPL
276343	2002 TY_{353}	—	October 10, 2002	Apache Point	SDSS	·	3.9 km	MPC · JPL
276344	2002 TM_{360}	—	October 10, 2002	Apache Point	SDSS	·	900 m	MPC · JPL
276345	2002 TM_{368}	—	October 10, 2002	Apache Point	SDSS	V	750 m	MPC · JPL
276346	2002 TP_{376}	—	October 5, 2002	Anderson Mesa	LONEOS	T_{j} (2.98) · EUP	5.7 km	MPC · JPL
276347	2002 TB_{378}	—	October 9, 2002	Palomar	NEAT	EOS	2.3 km	MPC · JPL
276348	2002 TW_{380}	—	October 5, 2002	Palomar	NEAT	·	2.5 km	MPC · JPL
276349	2002 TL_{385}	—	October 9, 2002	Palomar	NEAT	·	750 m	MPC · JPL
276350	2002 US_{3}	—	October 29, 2002	Palomar	NEAT	EUN	1.3 km	MPC · JPL
276351	2002 UT_{14}	—	October 30, 2002	Socorro	LINEAR	TIR	3.7 km	MPC · JPL
276352	2002 UX_{17}	—	October 30, 2002	Palomar	NEAT	·	3.6 km	MPC · JPL
276353	2002 UY_{20}	—	October 28, 2002	Kvistaberg	Uppsala-DLR Asteroid Survey	·	1.2 km	MPC · JPL
276354	2002 UV_{38}	—	October 31, 2002	Palomar	NEAT	slow	3.8 km	MPC · JPL
276355	2002 UV_{51}	—	October 29, 2002	Apache Point	SDSS	·	3.7 km	MPC · JPL
276356	2002 UQ_{52}	—	October 29, 2002	Apache Point	SDSS	·	3.3 km	MPC · JPL
276357	2002 UK_{55}	—	October 29, 2002	Apache Point	SDSS	·	2.7 km	MPC · JPL
276358	2002 UT_{69}	—	October 30, 2002	Apache Point	SDSS	·	5.8 km	MPC · JPL
276359	2002 UW_{72}	—	October 18, 2002	Palomar	NEAT	·	930 m	MPC · JPL
276360	2002 VB_{4}	—	November 1, 2002	Palomar	NEAT	·	1.1 km	MPC · JPL
276361	2002 VG_{5}	—	November 5, 2002	Wrightwood	J. W. Young	·	980 m	MPC · JPL
276362	2002 VD_{18}	—	November 2, 2002	Haleakala	NEAT	·	3.1 km	MPC · JPL
276363	2002 VD_{20}	—	November 4, 2002	Haleakala	NEAT	·	1.2 km	MPC · JPL
276364	2002 VN_{20}	—	November 5, 2002	Kvistaberg	Uppsala-DLR Asteroid Survey	·	1.2 km	MPC · JPL
276365	2002 VJ_{24}	—	November 5, 2002	Socorro	LINEAR	·	2.1 km	MPC · JPL
276366	2002 VC_{37}	—	November 2, 2002	Haleakala	NEAT	·	1.4 km	MPC · JPL
276367	2002 VG_{38}	—	November 5, 2002	Socorro	LINEAR	·	1.0 km	MPC · JPL
276368	2002 VA_{45}	—	November 5, 2002	Socorro	LINEAR	·	1.6 km	MPC · JPL
276369	2002 VB_{45}	—	November 5, 2002	Socorro	LINEAR	EOS	2.9 km	MPC · JPL
276370	2002 VO_{45}	—	November 5, 2002	Socorro	LINEAR	·	1.3 km	MPC · JPL
276371	2002 VQ_{59}	—	November 3, 2002	Haleakala	NEAT	·	1.4 km	MPC · JPL
276372	2002 VD_{73}	—	November 7, 2002	Socorro	LINEAR	·	1.1 km	MPC · JPL
276373	2002 VR_{83}	—	November 7, 2002	Socorro	LINEAR	·	1.1 km	MPC · JPL
276374	2002 VY_{87}	—	November 8, 2002	Socorro	LINEAR	PHO	1.4 km	MPC · JPL
276375	2002 VU_{92}	—	November 11, 2002	Socorro	LINEAR	·	1.2 km	MPC · JPL
276376	2002 VN_{101}	—	November 11, 2002	Socorro	LINEAR	·	1.0 km	MPC · JPL
276377	2002 VV_{102}	—	November 12, 2002	Socorro	LINEAR	·	1.3 km	MPC · JPL
276378	2002 VV_{115}	—	November 11, 2002	Anderson Mesa	LONEOS	·	1.4 km	MPC · JPL
276379	2002 VB_{126}	—	November 15, 2002	Palomar	NEAT	PHO	1.5 km	MPC · JPL
276380	2002 VS_{127}	—	November 11, 2002	Goodricke-Pigott	R. A. Tucker	·	5.2 km	MPC · JPL
276381	2002 VM_{142}	—	November 5, 2002	Palomar	NEAT	NYS	1.6 km	MPC · JPL
276382	2002 VN_{143}	—	November 14, 2002	Palomar	NEAT	·	3.7 km	MPC · JPL
276383	2002 VO_{145}	—	November 4, 2002	Palomar	NEAT	·	1.0 km	MPC · JPL
276384	2002 WJ_{2}	—	November 23, 2002	Palomar	NEAT	·	1.1 km	MPC · JPL
276385	2002 WG_{4}	—	November 24, 2002	Palomar	NEAT	·	3.7 km	MPC · JPL
276386	2002 WD_{22}	—	November 16, 2002	Palomar	NEAT	CYB	4.4 km	MPC · JPL
276387	2002 WO_{25}	—	November 25, 2002	Palomar	NEAT	NYS	1.1 km	MPC · JPL
276388	2002 WX_{27}	—	November 24, 2002	Palomar	NEAT	·	4.5 km	MPC · JPL
276389 Winkel	2002 WV_{28}	Winkel	November 22, 2002	Palomar	NEAT	·	800 m	MPC · JPL
276390	2002 WJ_{31}	—	November 28, 2002	Haleakala	NEAT	V	680 m	MPC · JPL
276391	2002 XK	—	December 1, 2002	Socorro	LINEAR	·	850 m	MPC · JPL
276392	2002 XH_{4}	—	December 3, 2002	Palomar	NEAT	AMO	450 m	MPC · JPL
276393	2002 XZ_{5}	—	December 1, 2002	Socorro	LINEAR	·	2.0 km	MPC · JPL
276394	2002 XF_{8}	—	December 2, 2002	Socorro	LINEAR	·	1.5 km	MPC · JPL
276395	2002 XK_{17}	—	December 5, 2002	Socorro	LINEAR	·	2.2 km	MPC · JPL
276396	2002 XG_{18}	—	December 5, 2002	Socorro	LINEAR	·	2.1 km	MPC · JPL
276397	2002 XA_{40}	—	December 11, 2002	Palomar	NEAT	AMO +1km	1.3 km	MPC · JPL
276398	2002 XM_{41}	—	December 6, 2002	Socorro	LINEAR	·	1.2 km	MPC · JPL
276399	2002 XR_{44}	—	December 7, 2002	Socorro	LINEAR	HYG	3.7 km	MPC · JPL
276400	2002 XS_{45}	—	December 10, 2002	Socorro	LINEAR	·	1.4 km	MPC · JPL

== 276401–276500 ==
back to top

Designation			Discovery			Properties		Ref
Permanent	Provisional	Named after	Date	Site	Discoverer(s)	Category	Diam.	Ref
276401	2002 XQ_{51}	—	December 10, 2002	Socorro	LINEAR	·	1.5 km	MPC · JPL
276402	2002 XA_{72}	—	December 11, 2002	Socorro	LINEAR	·	1.0 km	MPC · JPL
276403	2002 XF_{87}	—	December 11, 2002	Socorro	LINEAR	·	1.5 km	MPC · JPL
276404	2002 XL_{88}	—	December 13, 2002	Socorro	LINEAR	·	2.8 km	MPC · JPL
276405	2002 XJ_{95}	—	December 5, 2002	Socorro	LINEAR	MAS	770 m	MPC · JPL
276406	2002 XB_{96}	—	December 5, 2002	Socorro	LINEAR	·	1.1 km	MPC · JPL
276407	2002 XP_{100}	—	December 5, 2002	Socorro	LINEAR	MAS	850 m	MPC · JPL
276408	2002 XG_{116}	—	December 7, 2002	Apache Point	SDSS	V	960 m	MPC · JPL
276409	2002 YN_{2}	—	December 27, 2002	Socorro	LINEAR	APO	670 m	MPC · JPL
276410	2002 YU_{16}	—	December 31, 2002	Socorro	LINEAR	NYS	1.2 km	MPC · JPL
276411	2002 YV_{27}	—	December 31, 2002	Socorro	LINEAR	·	1.6 km	MPC · JPL
276412	2002 YR_{30}	—	December 31, 2002	Socorro	LINEAR	·	2.0 km	MPC · JPL
276413	2003 AS_{12}	—	January 1, 2003	Socorro	LINEAR	·	1.2 km	MPC · JPL
276414	2003 AY_{20}	—	January 5, 2003	Socorro	LINEAR	NYS	1.2 km	MPC · JPL
276415	2003 AU_{24}	—	January 4, 2003	Socorro	LINEAR	EOS	2.8 km	MPC · JPL
276416	2003 AV_{43}	—	January 5, 2003	Socorro	LINEAR	·	2.3 km	MPC · JPL
276417	2003 AY_{46}	—	January 5, 2003	Socorro	LINEAR	·	2.1 km	MPC · JPL
276418	2003 AS_{53}	—	January 5, 2003	Socorro	LINEAR	·	1.9 km	MPC · JPL
276419	2003 AA_{59}	—	January 5, 2003	Socorro	LINEAR	·	1.4 km	MPC · JPL
276420	2003 AV_{79}	—	January 11, 2003	Socorro	LINEAR	·	2.9 km	MPC · JPL
276421	2003 AE_{80}	—	January 12, 2003	Kitt Peak	Spacewatch	·	2.4 km	MPC · JPL
276422	2003 AM_{94}	—	January 5, 2003	Anderson Mesa	LONEOS	·	2.5 km	MPC · JPL
276423	2003 BA_{3}	—	January 25, 2003	Socorro	LINEAR	H	880 m	MPC · JPL
276424	2003 BQ_{13}	—	January 26, 2003	Haleakala	NEAT	·	1.4 km	MPC · JPL
276425	2003 BQ_{26}	—	January 26, 2003	Anderson Mesa	LONEOS	PHO	1.9 km	MPC · JPL
276426	2003 BF_{29}	—	January 27, 2003	Anderson Mesa	LONEOS	·	2.5 km	MPC · JPL
276427	2003 BG_{33}	—	January 27, 2003	Haleakala	NEAT	NYS	1.5 km	MPC · JPL
276428	2003 BX_{39}	—	January 27, 2003	Kitt Peak	Spacewatch	·	1.7 km	MPC · JPL
276429	2003 BQ_{49}	—	January 27, 2003	Anderson Mesa	LONEOS	NYS	1.3 km	MPC · JPL
276430	2003 BL_{62}	—	January 28, 2003	Palomar	NEAT	DOR	3.6 km	MPC · JPL
276431	2003 BR_{65}	—	January 30, 2003	Anderson Mesa	LONEOS	·	1.7 km	MPC · JPL
276432	2003 BH_{67}	—	January 30, 2003	Haleakala	NEAT	·	1.2 km	MPC · JPL
276433	2003 BZ_{77}	—	January 30, 2003	Haleakala	NEAT	·	1.7 km	MPC · JPL
276434	2003 BT_{89}	—	January 28, 2003	Socorro	LINEAR	·	1.8 km	MPC · JPL
276435	2003 CF_{1}	—	February 1, 2003	Socorro	LINEAR	(5)	1.8 km	MPC · JPL
276436	2003 CR_{16}	—	February 7, 2003	Kitt Peak	Spacewatch	·	2.1 km	MPC · JPL
276437	2003 CD_{19}	—	February 8, 2003	Socorro	LINEAR	·	1.4 km	MPC · JPL
276438	2003 CG_{19}	—	February 8, 2003	Socorro	LINEAR	·	1.8 km	MPC · JPL
276439	2003 CB_{21}	—	February 10, 2003	Bergisch Gladbach	W. Bickel	·	1.3 km	MPC · JPL
276440	2003 DJ_{16}	—	February 3, 2003	Haleakala	NEAT	H	690 m	MPC · JPL
276441	2003 EL_{11}	—	March 6, 2003	Socorro	LINEAR	·	1.2 km	MPC · JPL
276442	2003 EF_{17}	—	March 5, 2003	Socorro	LINEAR	·	1.3 km	MPC · JPL
276443	2003 EJ_{22}	—	March 6, 2003	Socorro	LINEAR	·	1.6 km	MPC · JPL
276444	2003 EV_{32}	—	March 7, 2003	Anderson Mesa	LONEOS	PHO	1.1 km	MPC · JPL
276445	2003 EF_{39}	—	March 8, 2003	Socorro	LINEAR	·	3.3 km	MPC · JPL
276446	2003 EO_{40}	—	March 8, 2003	Socorro	LINEAR	·	5.2 km	MPC · JPL
276447	2003 FZ_{2}	—	March 24, 2003	Socorro	LINEAR	H	930 m	MPC · JPL
276448	2003 FP_{8}	—	March 31, 2003	Socorro	LINEAR	H	610 m	MPC · JPL
276449	2003 FD_{10}	—	March 23, 2003	Kitt Peak	Spacewatch	·	1.5 km	MPC · JPL
276450	2003 FX_{19}	—	March 22, 2003	Palomar	NEAT	·	3.1 km	MPC · JPL
276451	2003 FH_{24}	—	March 23, 2003	Catalina	CSS	·	2.9 km	MPC · JPL
276452	2003 FG_{53}	—	March 25, 2003	Haleakala	NEAT	·	4.3 km	MPC · JPL
276453	2003 FF_{80}	—	March 27, 2003	Socorro	LINEAR	·	850 m	MPC · JPL
276454	2003 FM_{92}	—	March 29, 2003	Anderson Mesa	LONEOS	·	2.4 km	MPC · JPL
276455	2003 FV_{105}	—	March 26, 2003	Palomar	NEAT	·	1.9 km	MPC · JPL
276456	2003 FF_{109}	—	March 31, 2003	Anderson Mesa	LONEOS	·	1.7 km	MPC · JPL
276457	2003 FM_{109}	—	March 31, 2003	Anderson Mesa	LONEOS	·	2.7 km	MPC · JPL
276458	2003 GY_{2}	—	April 1, 2003	Socorro	LINEAR	RAF	1.1 km	MPC · JPL
276459	2003 GV_{10}	—	April 3, 2003	Haleakala	NEAT	·	2.3 km	MPC · JPL
276460	2003 GC_{24}	—	April 7, 2003	Palomar	NEAT	·	1.7 km	MPC · JPL
276461	2003 GJ_{26}	—	April 4, 2003	Kitt Peak	Spacewatch	·	1.4 km	MPC · JPL
276462	2003 GO_{34}	—	April 7, 2003	Kitt Peak	Spacewatch	·	1.3 km	MPC · JPL
276463	2003 GR_{47}	—	April 7, 2003	Kitt Peak	Spacewatch	·	1.8 km	MPC · JPL
276464	2003 GE_{56}	—	April 5, 2003	Kitt Peak	Spacewatch	·	860 m	MPC · JPL
276465	2003 HO_{4}	—	April 24, 2003	Anderson Mesa	LONEOS	(5)	1.6 km	MPC · JPL
276466	2003 HY_{5}	—	April 22, 2003	Goodricke-Pigott	Kessel, J. W.	·	4.1 km	MPC · JPL
276467	2003 HX_{18}	—	April 25, 2003	Kitt Peak	Spacewatch	EUN	1.0 km	MPC · JPL
276468	2003 HQ_{32}	—	April 29, 2003	Haleakala	NEAT	AMO +1km	1.0 km	MPC · JPL
276469	2003 HN_{50}	—	April 29, 2003	Haleakala	NEAT	·	1.4 km	MPC · JPL
276470	2003 JT_{7}	—	May 2, 2003	Socorro	LINEAR	·	1.3 km	MPC · JPL
276471	2003 KL_{3}	—	May 23, 2003	Wrightwood	J. W. Young	·	2.0 km	MPC · JPL
276472	2003 KL_{8}	—	May 23, 2003	Kitt Peak	Spacewatch	·	1.1 km	MPC · JPL
276473	2003 KG_{12}	—	May 27, 2003	Anderson Mesa	LONEOS	EUP	4.7 km	MPC · JPL
276474	2003 KO_{13}	—	May 26, 2003	Kitt Peak	Spacewatch	·	1.8 km	MPC · JPL
276475	2003 KV_{13}	—	May 28, 2003	Haleakala	NEAT	·	1.6 km	MPC · JPL
276476	2003 MU_{3}	—	June 25, 2003	Anderson Mesa	LONEOS	·	3.0 km	MPC · JPL
276477	2003 MT_{4}	—	June 26, 2003	Socorro	LINEAR	·	1.8 km	MPC · JPL
276478	2003 MK_{10}	—	June 24, 2003	Bergisch Gladbach	W. Bickel	·	1.8 km	MPC · JPL
276479	2003 MQ_{12}	—	June 29, 2003	Socorro	LINEAR	·	2.5 km	MPC · JPL
276480	2003 NO_{1}	—	July 1, 2003	Socorro	LINEAR	·	1.8 km	MPC · JPL
276481	2003 NK_{13}	—	July 5, 2003	Kitt Peak	Spacewatch	·	2.2 km	MPC · JPL
276482	2003 ON_{2}	—	July 22, 2003	Haleakala	NEAT	·	5.8 km	MPC · JPL
276483	2003 OH_{9}	—	July 23, 2003	Palomar	NEAT	ADE	3.7 km	MPC · JPL
276484	2003 OC_{13}	—	July 25, 2003	Socorro	LINEAR	·	1.8 km	MPC · JPL
276485	2003 OR_{20}	—	July 31, 2003	Reedy Creek	J. Broughton	·	1.0 km	MPC · JPL
276486	2003 OG_{29}	—	July 24, 2003	Palomar	NEAT	·	2.1 km	MPC · JPL
276487	2003 OJ_{33}	—	July 24, 2003	Palomar	NEAT	MIS	3.0 km	MPC · JPL
276488	2003 PO	—	August 2, 2003	Haleakala	NEAT	JUN	1.6 km	MPC · JPL
276489	2003 PA_{2}	—	August 1, 2003	Haleakala	NEAT	·	2.0 km	MPC · JPL
276490	2003 PK_{11}	—	August 2, 2003	Reedy Creek	J. Broughton	·	5.3 km	MPC · JPL
276491	2003 QK_{4}	—	August 18, 2003	Campo Imperatore	CINEOS	MIS	3.1 km	MPC · JPL
276492	2003 QV_{16}	—	August 21, 2003	Palomar	NEAT	·	2.5 km	MPC · JPL
276493	2003 QZ_{16}	—	August 21, 2003	Campo Imperatore	CINEOS	·	2.3 km	MPC · JPL
276494	2003 QG_{17}	—	August 22, 2003	Palomar	NEAT	EUN	1.7 km	MPC · JPL
276495	2003 QJ_{25}	—	August 22, 2003	Palomar	NEAT	·	2.5 km	MPC · JPL
276496	2003 QU_{27}	—	August 23, 2003	Kleť	Kleť	EOS	3.5 km	MPC · JPL
276497	2003 QQ_{28}	—	August 22, 2003	Palomar	NEAT	·	2.5 km	MPC · JPL
276498	2003 QC_{47}	—	August 24, 2003	Socorro	LINEAR	·	2.9 km	MPC · JPL
276499	2003 QT_{51}	—	August 23, 2003	Palomar	NEAT	ADE	2.7 km	MPC · JPL
276500	2003 QV_{55}	—	August 23, 2003	Socorro	LINEAR	ADE	3.0 km	MPC · JPL

== 276501–276600 ==
back to top

Designation			Discovery			Properties		Ref
Permanent	Provisional	Named after	Date	Site	Discoverer(s)	Category	Diam.	Ref
276501	2003 QD_{58}	—	August 23, 2003	Socorro	LINEAR	EUN	1.9 km	MPC · JPL
276502	2003 QW_{60}	—	August 23, 2003	Socorro	LINEAR	·	2.6 km	MPC · JPL
276503	2003 QR_{63}	—	August 23, 2003	Socorro	LINEAR	·	4.3 km	MPC · JPL
276504	2003 QW_{67}	—	August 24, 2003	Črni Vrh	Mikuž, H.	·	2.1 km	MPC · JPL
276505	2003 QZ_{67}	—	August 25, 2003	Socorro	LINEAR	·	2.9 km	MPC · JPL
276506	2003 QH_{72}	—	August 23, 2003	Palomar	NEAT	·	2.6 km	MPC · JPL
276507	2003 QT_{73}	—	August 26, 2003	Črni Vrh	Mikuž, H.	WIT	1.5 km	MPC · JPL
276508	2003 QY_{74}	—	August 24, 2003	Socorro	LINEAR	526	3.3 km	MPC · JPL
276509	2003 QD_{88}	—	August 25, 2003	Socorro	LINEAR	·	2.4 km	MPC · JPL
276510	2003 QX_{89}	—	August 28, 2003	Socorro	LINEAR	·	3.8 km	MPC · JPL
276511	2003 QA_{99}	—	August 30, 2003	Kitt Peak	Spacewatch	·	2.2 km	MPC · JPL
276512	2003 QJ_{99}	—	August 30, 2003	Kitt Peak	Spacewatch	·	2.7 km	MPC · JPL
276513	2003 QS_{100}	—	August 28, 2003	Haleakala	NEAT	·	2.5 km	MPC · JPL
276514	2003 QL_{103}	—	August 31, 2003	Haleakala	NEAT	(13314)	2.9 km	MPC · JPL
276515	2003 QZ_{104}	—	August 29, 2003	Haleakala	NEAT	·	3.6 km	MPC · JPL
276516	2003 QS_{106}	—	August 31, 2003	Haleakala	NEAT	·	2.5 km	MPC · JPL
276517	2003 QO_{107}	—	August 31, 2003	Socorro	LINEAR	·	2.7 km	MPC · JPL
276518	2003 QK_{115}	—	August 31, 2003	Socorro	LINEAR	(1547)	2.6 km	MPC · JPL
276519	2003 RU_{12}	—	September 14, 2003	Haleakala	NEAT	DOR	3.6 km	MPC · JPL
276520	2003 RX_{13}	—	September 15, 2003	Haleakala	NEAT	JUN	1.8 km	MPC · JPL
276521	2003 RM_{14}	—	September 14, 2003	Haleakala	NEAT	·	3.1 km	MPC · JPL
276522	2003 RL_{17}	—	September 15, 2003	Palomar	NEAT	·	3.8 km	MPC · JPL
276523	2003 RC_{19}	—	September 15, 2003	Anderson Mesa	LONEOS	EOS	2.6 km	MPC · JPL
276524	2003 RT_{20}	—	September 15, 2003	Anderson Mesa	LONEOS	·	2.2 km	MPC · JPL
276525	2003 RX_{25}	—	September 15, 2003	Palomar	NEAT	·	2.9 km	MPC · JPL
276526	2003 RY_{25}	—	September 15, 2003	Palomar	NEAT	·	2.9 km	MPC · JPL
276527	2003 RZ_{25}	—	September 15, 2003	Palomar	NEAT	·	3.3 km	MPC · JPL
276528	2003 RA_{26}	—	September 15, 2003	Palomar	NEAT	·	2.8 km	MPC · JPL
276529	2003 SU_{2}	—	September 16, 2003	Kitt Peak	Spacewatch	KOR	1.5 km	MPC · JPL
276530	2003 SU_{11}	—	September 16, 2003	Kitt Peak	Spacewatch	·	2.2 km	MPC · JPL
276531	2003 SK_{30}	—	September 18, 2003	Kitt Peak	Spacewatch	·	3.0 km	MPC · JPL
276532	2003 SV_{49}	—	September 18, 2003	Palomar	NEAT	·	3.2 km	MPC · JPL
276533	2003 SZ_{58}	—	September 17, 2003	Anderson Mesa	LONEOS	EMA	5.1 km	MPC · JPL
276534	2003 SJ_{60}	—	September 17, 2003	Anderson Mesa	LONEOS	·	2.9 km	MPC · JPL
276535	2003 SB_{61}	—	September 17, 2003	Socorro	LINEAR	·	3.3 km	MPC · JPL
276536	2003 SN_{62}	—	September 17, 2003	Socorro	LINEAR	EMA	4.7 km	MPC · JPL
276537	2003 SS_{69}	—	September 17, 2003	Kitt Peak	Spacewatch	·	4.1 km	MPC · JPL
276538	2003 SO_{77}	—	September 19, 2003	Kitt Peak	Spacewatch	·	2.8 km	MPC · JPL
276539	2003 SF_{78}	—	September 19, 2003	Kitt Peak	Spacewatch	·	750 m	MPC · JPL
276540	2003 ST_{80}	—	September 19, 2003	Haleakala	NEAT	·	4.1 km	MPC · JPL
276541	2003 SC_{81}	—	September 19, 2003	Kitt Peak	Spacewatch	·	2.7 km	MPC · JPL
276542	2003 SQ_{82}	—	September 18, 2003	Palomar	NEAT	·	3.1 km	MPC · JPL
276543	2003 SA_{88}	—	September 17, 2003	Campo Imperatore	CINEOS	AGN	1.7 km	MPC · JPL
276544	2003 SU_{88}	—	September 18, 2003	Anderson Mesa	LONEOS	PAD	2.6 km	MPC · JPL
276545	2003 SF_{89}	—	September 18, 2003	Palomar	NEAT	·	2.5 km	MPC · JPL
276546	2003 ST_{100}	—	September 20, 2003	Desert Eagle	W. K. Y. Yeung	BRA	1.8 km	MPC · JPL
276547	2003 ST_{101}	—	September 20, 2003	Haleakala	NEAT	·	3.7 km	MPC · JPL
276548	2003 SR_{105}	—	September 20, 2003	Kitt Peak	Spacewatch	KOR	1.4 km	MPC · JPL
276549	2003 SX_{116}	—	September 16, 2003	Palomar	NEAT	·	2.7 km	MPC · JPL
276550	2003 SH_{132}	—	September 19, 2003	Kitt Peak	Spacewatch	(3460)	2.5 km	MPC · JPL
276551	2003 SN_{133}	—	September 18, 2003	Kitt Peak	Spacewatch	·	1.8 km	MPC · JPL
276552	2003 SR_{135}	—	September 19, 2003	Kitt Peak	Spacewatch	·	2.5 km	MPC · JPL
276553	2003 SG_{136}	—	September 19, 2003	Campo Imperatore	CINEOS	AGN	1.4 km	MPC · JPL
276554	2003 SF_{137}	—	September 20, 2003	Palomar	NEAT	·	2.8 km	MPC · JPL
276555	2003 SV_{152}	—	September 19, 2003	Anderson Mesa	LONEOS	·	3.5 km	MPC · JPL
276556	2003 SC_{168}	—	September 23, 2003	Haleakala	NEAT	·	2.6 km	MPC · JPL
276557	2003 SN_{179}	—	September 19, 2003	Palomar	NEAT	HYG	3.1 km	MPC · JPL
276558	2003 SO_{180}	—	September 19, 2003	Kitt Peak	Spacewatch	·	3.3 km	MPC · JPL
276559	2003 SR_{185}	—	September 22, 2003	Anderson Mesa	LONEOS	·	2.2 km	MPC · JPL
276560	2003 SA_{192}	—	September 19, 2003	Palomar	NEAT	·	4.4 km	MPC · JPL
276561	2003 SL_{194}	—	September 20, 2003	Kitt Peak	Spacewatch	V	1.5 km	MPC · JPL
276562	2003 SP_{194}	—	September 20, 2003	Palomar	NEAT	·	1.3 km	MPC · JPL
276563	2003 SO_{198}	—	September 21, 2003	Anderson Mesa	LONEOS	·	4.6 km	MPC · JPL
276564	2003 SF_{202}	—	September 22, 2003	Anderson Mesa	LONEOS	·	2.2 km	MPC · JPL
276565	2003 SS_{202}	—	September 22, 2003	Anderson Mesa	LONEOS	·	2.7 km	MPC · JPL
276566	2003 SG_{210}	—	September 26, 2003	Socorro	LINEAR	·	2.8 km	MPC · JPL
276567	2003 SS_{212}	—	September 25, 2003	Haleakala	NEAT	·	2.5 km	MPC · JPL
276568 Joestübler	2003 ST_{217}	Joestübler	September 27, 2003	Linz	Linz	·	3.2 km	MPC · JPL
276569	2003 SL_{218}	—	September 28, 2003	Desert Eagle	W. K. Y. Yeung	·	2.3 km	MPC · JPL
276570	2003 SO_{221}	—	September 27, 2003	Socorro	LINEAR	·	4.6 km	MPC · JPL
276571	2003 SF_{237}	—	September 26, 2003	Socorro	LINEAR	·	2.9 km	MPC · JPL
276572	2003 SK_{237}	—	September 26, 2003	Socorro	LINEAR	·	2.9 km	MPC · JPL
276573	2003 SY_{244}	—	September 26, 2003	Socorro	LINEAR	·	2.5 km	MPC · JPL
276574	2003 SD_{245}	—	September 26, 2003	Socorro	LINEAR	EOS	2.7 km	MPC · JPL
276575	2003 SR_{270}	—	September 25, 2003	Palomar	NEAT	·	3.2 km	MPC · JPL
276576	2003 SL_{279}	—	September 17, 2003	Kitt Peak	Spacewatch	·	4.1 km	MPC · JPL
276577	2003 ST_{281}	—	September 19, 2003	Kitt Peak	Spacewatch	·	2.1 km	MPC · JPL
276578	2003 SV_{282}	—	September 20, 2003	Campo Imperatore	CINEOS	T_{j} (2.99)	3.1 km	MPC · JPL
276579	2003 SM_{288}	—	September 28, 2003	Desert Eagle	W. K. Y. Yeung	·	2.5 km	MPC · JPL
276580	2003 SU_{289}	—	September 28, 2003	Socorro	LINEAR	GEF	1.8 km	MPC · JPL
276581	2003 ST_{300}	—	September 17, 2003	Palomar	NEAT	·	2.8 km	MPC · JPL
276582	2003 SS_{309}	—	September 27, 2003	Socorro	LINEAR	·	2.9 km	MPC · JPL
276583	2003 SD_{312}	—	September 30, 2003	Kitt Peak	Spacewatch	·	3.2 km	MPC · JPL
276584	2003 SG_{318}	—	September 16, 2003	Kitt Peak	Spacewatch	AGN	1.4 km	MPC · JPL
276585	2003 SB_{320}	—	September 16, 2003	Kitt Peak	Spacewatch	EOS	2.3 km	MPC · JPL
276586	2003 SN_{325}	—	September 17, 2003	Kitt Peak	Spacewatch	KOR	1.7 km	MPC · JPL
276587	2003 SX_{325}	—	September 18, 2003	Kitt Peak	Spacewatch	·	700 m	MPC · JPL
276588	2003 SB_{328}	—	September 20, 2003	Campo Imperatore	CINEOS	·	2.2 km	MPC · JPL
276589	2003 SR_{331}	—	September 27, 2003	Kitt Peak	Spacewatch	·	2.4 km	MPC · JPL
276590	2003 SK_{336}	—	September 26, 2003	Apache Point	SDSS	·	4.1 km	MPC · JPL
276591	2003 ST_{384}	—	September 26, 2003	Apache Point	SDSS	AGN	1.1 km	MPC · JPL
276592	2003 SA_{386}	—	September 26, 2003	Apache Point	SDSS	·	3.1 km	MPC · JPL
276593	2003 SN_{387}	—	September 26, 2003	Apache Point	SDSS	·	2.0 km	MPC · JPL
276594	2003 SU_{387}	—	September 26, 2003	Apache Point	SDSS	AGN	1.3 km	MPC · JPL
276595	2003 SZ_{399}	—	September 26, 2003	Apache Point	SDSS	·	2.3 km	MPC · JPL
276596	2003 SX_{404}	—	September 27, 2003	Apache Point	SDSS	URS	4.6 km	MPC · JPL
276597	2003 SH_{430}	—	September 30, 2003	Kitt Peak	Spacewatch	EOS	2.2 km	MPC · JPL
276598	2003 TK_{18}	—	October 15, 2003	Anderson Mesa	LONEOS	·	3.1 km	MPC · JPL
276599	2003 TZ_{34}	—	October 1, 2003	Kitt Peak	Spacewatch	EUP	4.0 km	MPC · JPL
276600	2003 TG_{48}	—	October 3, 2003	Kitt Peak	Spacewatch	·	1.6 km	MPC · JPL

== 276601–276700 ==
back to top

Designation			Discovery			Properties		Ref
Permanent	Provisional	Named after	Date	Site	Discoverer(s)	Category	Diam.	Ref
276601	2003 TH_{54}	—	October 5, 2003	Kitt Peak	Spacewatch	NAE	2.4 km	MPC · JPL
276602	2003 TZ_{55}	—	October 5, 2003	Kitt Peak	Spacewatch	·	2.6 km	MPC · JPL
276603	2003 TG_{59}	—	October 14, 2003	Anderson Mesa	LONEOS	·	1.5 km	MPC · JPL
276604	2003 UH_{21}	—	October 16, 2003	Anderson Mesa	LONEOS	·	2.4 km	MPC · JPL
276605	2003 UN_{30}	—	October 16, 2003	Kitt Peak	Spacewatch	(16286)	2.6 km	MPC · JPL
276606	2003 UR_{41}	—	October 17, 2003	Kitt Peak	Spacewatch	·	2.1 km	MPC · JPL
276607	2003 UG_{54}	—	October 18, 2003	Palomar	NEAT	·	3.8 km	MPC · JPL
276608	2003 UA_{68}	—	October 16, 2003	Kitt Peak	Spacewatch	KOR	1.5 km	MPC · JPL
276609	2003 UF_{69}	—	October 18, 2003	Kitt Peak	Spacewatch	KOR	1.4 km	MPC · JPL
276610	2003 UO_{70}	—	October 18, 2003	Kitt Peak	Spacewatch	·	2.5 km	MPC · JPL
276611	2003 UF_{82}	—	October 19, 2003	Kitt Peak	Spacewatch	·	3.0 km	MPC · JPL
276612	2003 UK_{83}	—	October 17, 2003	Anderson Mesa	LONEOS	·	4.3 km	MPC · JPL
276613	2003 UU_{83}	—	October 18, 2003	Palomar	NEAT	·	4.7 km	MPC · JPL
276614	2003 UF_{91}	—	October 20, 2003	Socorro	LINEAR	EOS	2.6 km	MPC · JPL
276615	2003 UG_{92}	—	October 20, 2003	Palomar	NEAT	·	2.7 km	MPC · JPL
276616	2003 UK_{99}	—	October 19, 2003	Anderson Mesa	LONEOS	·	2.9 km	MPC · JPL
276617	2003 UN_{102}	—	October 20, 2003	Palomar	NEAT	·	2.4 km	MPC · JPL
276618	2003 UC_{113}	—	October 20, 2003	Socorro	LINEAR	V	910 m	MPC · JPL
276619	2003 UT_{113}	—	October 20, 2003	Socorro	LINEAR	·	3.9 km	MPC · JPL
276620	2003 UV_{116}	—	October 21, 2003	Socorro	LINEAR	·	730 m	MPC · JPL
276621	2003 UO_{125}	—	October 20, 2003	Socorro	LINEAR	·	4.4 km	MPC · JPL
276622	2003 UA_{135}	—	October 21, 2003	Anderson Mesa	LONEOS	·	3.2 km	MPC · JPL
276623	2003 UG_{136}	—	October 21, 2003	Palomar	NEAT	·	900 m	MPC · JPL
276624	2003 UW_{139}	—	October 16, 2003	Anderson Mesa	LONEOS	·	2.9 km	MPC · JPL
276625	2003 UA_{146}	—	October 18, 2003	Anderson Mesa	LONEOS	·	3.0 km	MPC · JPL
276626	2003 UO_{148}	—	October 19, 2003	Anderson Mesa	LONEOS	·	5.9 km	MPC · JPL
276627	2003 UL_{149}	—	October 20, 2003	Kitt Peak	Spacewatch	·	3.1 km	MPC · JPL
276628	2003 UQ_{151}	—	October 21, 2003	Socorro	LINEAR	·	3.1 km	MPC · JPL
276629	2003 UT_{154}	—	October 20, 2003	Kitt Peak	Spacewatch	·	2.3 km	MPC · JPL
276630	2003 UT_{156}	—	October 20, 2003	Socorro	LINEAR	·	3.1 km	MPC · JPL
276631	2003 UO_{157}	—	October 20, 2003	Kitt Peak	Spacewatch	·	6.4 km	MPC · JPL
276632	2003 UX_{160}	—	October 21, 2003	Kitt Peak	Spacewatch	EOS	2.6 km	MPC · JPL
276633	2003 UD_{163}	—	October 21, 2003	Socorro	LINEAR	·	1.4 km	MPC · JPL
276634	2003 UL_{166}	—	October 21, 2003	Kitt Peak	Spacewatch	T_{j} (2.99)	6.2 km	MPC · JPL
276635	2003 UM_{180}	—	October 21, 2003	Socorro	LINEAR	·	1.6 km	MPC · JPL
276636	2003 UC_{201}	—	October 21, 2003	Socorro	LINEAR	·	1.3 km	MPC · JPL
276637	2003 UA_{208}	—	October 22, 2003	Kitt Peak	Spacewatch	·	3.9 km	MPC · JPL
276638	2003 UU_{208}	—	October 22, 2003	Kitt Peak	Spacewatch	THM	2.4 km	MPC · JPL
276639	2003 UK_{210}	—	October 23, 2003	Kitt Peak	Spacewatch	·	800 m	MPC · JPL
276640	2003 UP_{210}	—	October 23, 2003	Kitt Peak	Spacewatch	·	2.2 km	MPC · JPL
276641	2003 UM_{213}	—	October 24, 2003	Socorro	LINEAR	·	2.5 km	MPC · JPL
276642	2003 UW_{220}	—	October 22, 2003	Kitt Peak	Spacewatch	·	4.8 km	MPC · JPL
276643	2003 UD_{226}	—	October 22, 2003	Socorro	LINEAR	·	2.6 km	MPC · JPL
276644	2003 UW_{227}	—	October 23, 2003	Kitt Peak	Spacewatch	EOS	2.3 km	MPC · JPL
276645	2003 UH_{243}	—	October 24, 2003	Socorro	LINEAR	V	800 m	MPC · JPL
276646	2003 UF_{253}	—	October 27, 2003	Socorro	LINEAR	·	7.0 km	MPC · JPL
276647	2003 UW_{253}	—	October 24, 2003	Kitt Peak	Spacewatch	·	2.7 km	MPC · JPL
276648	2003 UJ_{254}	—	October 24, 2003	Kitt Peak	Spacewatch	·	2.4 km	MPC · JPL
276649	2003 UL_{264}	—	October 27, 2003	Socorro	LINEAR	V	830 m	MPC · JPL
276650	2003 UT_{271}	—	October 28, 2003	Socorro	LINEAR	·	2.4 km	MPC · JPL
276651	2003 UA_{272}	—	October 28, 2003	Socorro	LINEAR	·	5.9 km	MPC · JPL
276652	2003 UW_{273}	—	October 29, 2003	Kitt Peak	Spacewatch	·	2.8 km	MPC · JPL
276653	2003 US_{308}	—	October 19, 2003	Kitt Peak	Spacewatch	·	2.7 km	MPC · JPL
276654	2003 UP_{324}	—	October 17, 2003	Apache Point	SDSS	MAR	1.5 km	MPC · JPL
276655	2003 UN_{368}	—	October 21, 2003	Kitt Peak	Spacewatch	·	2.1 km	MPC · JPL
276656	2003 VF_{5}	—	November 15, 2003	Kitt Peak	Spacewatch	EOS	1.7 km	MPC · JPL
276657	2003 VM_{7}	—	November 15, 2003	Kitt Peak	Spacewatch	MAS	840 m	MPC · JPL
276658	2003 VQ_{11}	—	November 1, 2003	Socorro	LINEAR	·	2.9 km	MPC · JPL
276659	2003 WZ_{8}	—	November 16, 2003	Kitt Peak	Spacewatch	·	3.7 km	MPC · JPL
276660	2003 WB_{25}	—	November 21, 2003	Socorro	LINEAR	AMO	740 m	MPC · JPL
276661	2003 WB_{40}	—	November 19, 2003	Kitt Peak	Spacewatch	·	770 m	MPC · JPL
276662	2003 WD_{55}	—	November 20, 2003	Socorro	LINEAR	·	3.8 km	MPC · JPL
276663	2003 WQ_{58}	—	November 18, 2003	Kitt Peak	Spacewatch	·	1.6 km	MPC · JPL
276664	2003 WC_{59}	—	November 18, 2003	Kitt Peak	Spacewatch	·	3.7 km	MPC · JPL
276665	2003 WF_{61}	—	November 19, 2003	Kitt Peak	Spacewatch	EUP	3.6 km	MPC · JPL
276666	2003 WO_{71}	—	November 20, 2003	Socorro	LINEAR	·	3.5 km	MPC · JPL
276667	2003 WH_{76}	—	November 19, 2003	Socorro	LINEAR	VER	3.5 km	MPC · JPL
276668	2003 WC_{110}	—	November 20, 2003	Socorro	LINEAR	EOS	2.6 km	MPC · JPL
276669	2003 WL_{151}	—	November 26, 2003	Kitt Peak	Spacewatch	EOS	2.4 km	MPC · JPL
276670	2003 WG_{156}	—	November 29, 2003	Socorro	LINEAR	·	4.3 km	MPC · JPL
276671	2003 WP_{157}	—	November 22, 2003	Socorro	LINEAR	PHO	1.7 km	MPC · JPL
276672	2003 WS_{179}	—	November 20, 2003	Kitt Peak	M. W. Buie	·	3.2 km	MPC · JPL
276673	2003 WC_{187}	—	November 23, 2003	Kitt Peak	M. W. Buie	·	2.1 km	MPC · JPL
276674	2003 WQ_{189}	—	November 21, 2003	Catalina	CSS	TIR	4.0 km	MPC · JPL
276675	2003 WX_{190}	—	November 20, 2003	Socorro	LINEAR	·	1.3 km	MPC · JPL
276676	2003 WV_{192}	—	November 19, 2003	Anderson Mesa	LONEOS	EMA	5.0 km	MPC · JPL
276677	2003 WW_{192}	—	November 20, 2003	Socorro	LINEAR	·	950 m	MPC · JPL
276678	2003 XB_{2}	—	December 1, 2003	Socorro	LINEAR	EOS	3.1 km	MPC · JPL
276679	2003 XL_{18}	—	December 15, 2003	Socorro	LINEAR	THB	3.7 km	MPC · JPL
276680	2003 XR_{24}	—	December 1, 2003	Kitt Peak	Spacewatch	·	3.5 km	MPC · JPL
276681 Loremaes	2003 YT_{24}	Loremaes	December 18, 2003	Uccle	T. Pauwels, P. De Cat	·	1.8 km	MPC · JPL
276682	2003 YE_{25}	—	December 18, 2003	Socorro	LINEAR	NYS	1.8 km	MPC · JPL
276683	2003 YQ_{34}	—	December 18, 2003	Socorro	LINEAR	·	2.9 km	MPC · JPL
276684	2003 YS_{36}	—	December 17, 2003	Kitt Peak	Spacewatch	(2076)	860 m	MPC · JPL
276685	2003 YX_{40}	—	December 19, 2003	Kitt Peak	Spacewatch	·	4.1 km	MPC · JPL
276686	2003 YY_{41}	—	December 19, 2003	Kitt Peak	Spacewatch	·	750 m	MPC · JPL
276687	2003 YX_{45}	—	December 17, 2003	Socorro	LINEAR	·	6.0 km	MPC · JPL
276688	2003 YD_{58}	—	December 19, 2003	Socorro	LINEAR	·	1.9 km	MPC · JPL
276689	2003 YD_{90}	—	December 19, 2003	Kitt Peak	Spacewatch	·	910 m	MPC · JPL
276690	2003 YW_{91}	—	December 21, 2003	Kitt Peak	Spacewatch	·	5.7 km	MPC · JPL
276691	2003 YU_{107}	—	December 25, 2003	Piszkéstető	K. Sárneczky	EOS	5.3 km	MPC · JPL
276692	2003 YC_{113}	—	December 23, 2003	Socorro	LINEAR	·	5.6 km	MPC · JPL
276693	2003 YZ_{116}	—	December 27, 2003	Socorro	LINEAR	T_{j} (2.98) · EUP	5.2 km	MPC · JPL
276694	2003 YE_{125}	—	December 27, 2003	Socorro	LINEAR	THB	4.8 km	MPC · JPL
276695	2003 YE_{127}	—	December 27, 2003	Socorro	LINEAR	·	4.3 km	MPC · JPL
276696	2003 YA_{131}	—	December 28, 2003	Socorro	LINEAR	·	5.9 km	MPC · JPL
276697	2003 YX_{149}	—	December 29, 2003	Socorro	LINEAR	·	4.4 km	MPC · JPL
276698	2004 AA_{7}	—	January 15, 2004	Kitt Peak	Spacewatch	·	940 m	MPC · JPL
276699	2004 AJ_{14}	—	January 14, 2004	Palomar	NEAT	·	2.4 km	MPC · JPL
276700	2004 AJ_{15}	—	January 15, 2004	Kitt Peak	Spacewatch	·	3.3 km	MPC · JPL

== 276701–276800 ==
back to top

Designation			Discovery			Properties		Ref
Permanent	Provisional	Named after	Date	Site	Discoverer(s)	Category	Diam.	Ref
276701	2004 BH_{1}	—	January 16, 2004	Kitt Peak	Spacewatch	·	4.1 km	MPC · JPL
276702	2004 BZ_{9}	—	January 16, 2004	Palomar	NEAT	·	4.3 km	MPC · JPL
276703	2004 BL_{11}	—	January 18, 2004	Kitt Peak	Spacewatch	APO	520 m	MPC · JPL
276704	2004 BS_{13}	—	January 17, 2004	Palomar	NEAT	·	1.5 km	MPC · JPL
276705	2004 BR_{27}	—	January 18, 2004	Kitt Peak	Spacewatch	EOS	2.5 km	MPC · JPL
276706	2004 BV_{27}	—	January 18, 2004	Palomar	NEAT	·	4.6 km	MPC · JPL
276707	2004 BN_{32}	—	January 19, 2004	Kitt Peak	Spacewatch	·	3.6 km	MPC · JPL
276708	2004 BW_{32}	—	January 19, 2004	Kitt Peak	Spacewatch	·	3.7 km	MPC · JPL
276709	2004 BA_{33}	—	January 19, 2004	Kitt Peak	Spacewatch	·	3.6 km	MPC · JPL
276710	2004 BZ_{34}	—	January 19, 2004	Kitt Peak	Spacewatch	·	790 m	MPC · JPL
276711	2004 BS_{49}	—	January 21, 2004	Socorro	LINEAR	·	1.6 km	MPC · JPL
276712	2004 BG_{70}	—	January 22, 2004	Socorro	LINEAR	·	1.4 km	MPC · JPL
276713	2004 BH_{74}	—	January 24, 2004	Socorro	LINEAR	·	1.2 km	MPC · JPL
276714	2004 BW_{106}	—	January 27, 2004	Socorro	LINEAR	·	990 m	MPC · JPL
276715	2004 BC_{148}	—	January 16, 2004	Kitt Peak	Spacewatch	·	3.3 km	MPC · JPL
276716	2004 BH_{152}	—	January 19, 2004	Socorro	LINEAR	·	4.2 km	MPC · JPL
276717	2004 CW_{6}	—	February 11, 2004	Anderson Mesa	LONEOS	·	1.1 km	MPC · JPL
276718	2004 CZ_{7}	—	February 10, 2004	Palomar	NEAT	·	940 m	MPC · JPL
276719	2004 CL_{15}	—	February 11, 2004	Kitt Peak	Spacewatch	·	4.1 km	MPC · JPL
276720	2004 CV_{19}	—	February 11, 2004	Kitt Peak	Spacewatch	·	4.6 km	MPC · JPL
276721	2004 CF_{21}	—	February 11, 2004	Palomar	NEAT	·	830 m	MPC · JPL
276722	2004 CB_{44}	—	February 12, 2004	Kitt Peak	Spacewatch	·	690 m	MPC · JPL
276723	2004 CO_{45}	—	February 13, 2004	Kitt Peak	Spacewatch	·	1.0 km	MPC · JPL
276724	2004 CO_{47}	—	February 14, 2004	Haleakala	NEAT	·	1.9 km	MPC · JPL
276725	2004 CT_{95}	—	February 13, 2004	Palomar	NEAT	·	1.2 km	MPC · JPL
276726	2004 CD_{100}	—	February 15, 2004	Catalina	CSS	·	1.8 km	MPC · JPL
276727	2004 CX_{104}	—	February 13, 2004	Palomar	NEAT	·	1.1 km	MPC · JPL
276728	2004 CO_{110}	—	February 11, 2004	Palomar	NEAT	·	960 m	MPC · JPL
276729	2004 DN_{37}	—	February 19, 2004	Socorro	LINEAR	·	830 m	MPC · JPL
276730	2004 DE_{49}	—	February 19, 2004	Socorro	LINEAR	·	1.0 km	MPC · JPL
276731	2004 ET_{7}	—	March 12, 2004	Palomar	NEAT	·	790 m	MPC · JPL
276732	2004 EV_{9}	—	March 15, 2004	Socorro	LINEAR	APO +1km	1.0 km	MPC · JPL
276733	2004 EP_{12}	—	January 30, 2004	Kitt Peak	Spacewatch	·	1.5 km	MPC · JPL
276734	2004 EL_{13}	—	March 11, 2004	Palomar	NEAT	·	1.0 km	MPC · JPL
276735	2004 EE_{14}	—	March 11, 2004	Palomar	NEAT	·	1.1 km	MPC · JPL
276736	2004 EU_{34}	—	March 12, 2004	Palomar	NEAT	·	900 m	MPC · JPL
276737	2004 ET_{37}	—	March 14, 2004	Catalina	CSS	·	1.1 km	MPC · JPL
276738	2004 ET_{42}	—	March 15, 2004	Catalina	CSS	·	1.0 km	MPC · JPL
276739	2004 EB_{46}	—	March 15, 2004	Socorro	LINEAR	·	820 m	MPC · JPL
276740	2004 EA_{66}	—	March 14, 2004	Kitt Peak	Spacewatch	·	1.4 km	MPC · JPL
276741	2004 EM_{66}	—	March 14, 2004	Socorro	LINEAR	·	1.5 km	MPC · JPL
276742	2004 ED_{90}	—	March 14, 2004	Kitt Peak	Spacewatch	·	1.4 km	MPC · JPL
276743	2004 EZ_{99}	—	March 15, 2004	Kitt Peak	Spacewatch	·	870 m	MPC · JPL
276744	2004 FK_{18}	—	March 28, 2004	Desert Eagle	W. K. Y. Yeung	·	750 m	MPC · JPL
276745	2004 FE_{23}	—	March 17, 2004	Kitt Peak	Spacewatch	V	690 m	MPC · JPL
276746	2004 FG_{27}	—	March 17, 2004	Kitt Peak	Spacewatch	·	1.1 km	MPC · JPL
276747	2004 FX_{30}	—	March 29, 2004	Socorro	LINEAR	PHO	1.3 km	MPC · JPL
276748	2004 FT_{32}	—	March 16, 2004	Catalina	CSS	PHO	2.7 km	MPC · JPL
276749	2004 FE_{67}	—	March 20, 2004	Socorro	LINEAR	·	990 m	MPC · JPL
276750	2004 FR_{85}	—	March 19, 2004	Palomar	NEAT	·	750 m	MPC · JPL
276751	2004 FG_{90}	—	March 20, 2004	Socorro	LINEAR	·	690 m	MPC · JPL
276752	2004 FG_{108}	—	March 23, 2004	Socorro	LINEAR	·	1.1 km	MPC · JPL
276753	2004 FE_{122}	—	March 25, 2004	Anderson Mesa	LONEOS	·	1.1 km	MPC · JPL
276754	2004 FV_{129}	—	March 19, 2004	Palomar	NEAT	EUN	2.0 km	MPC · JPL
276755	2004 FZ_{135}	—	March 27, 2004	Socorro	LINEAR	·	870 m	MPC · JPL
276756	2004 FS_{138}	—	March 17, 2004	Socorro	LINEAR	·	980 m	MPC · JPL
276757	2004 FK_{145}	—	March 30, 2004	Kitt Peak	Spacewatch	·	5.0 km	MPC · JPL
276758	2004 FK_{147}	—	March 29, 2004	Socorro	LINEAR	PHO	1.4 km	MPC · JPL
276759	2004 FZ_{159}	—	March 18, 2004	Kitt Peak	Spacewatch	·	860 m	MPC · JPL
276760	2004 GA_{19}	—	April 10, 2004	Kvistaberg	Uppsala-DLR Asteroid Survey	·	1.0 km	MPC · JPL
276761	2004 GU_{21}	—	April 12, 2004	Catalina	CSS	·	1.3 km	MPC · JPL
276762	2004 GP_{40}	—	April 12, 2004	Kitt Peak	Spacewatch	NYS	1.4 km	MPC · JPL
276763	2004 GD_{42}	—	April 14, 2004	Kitt Peak	Spacewatch	V	1.0 km	MPC · JPL
276764	2004 GN_{42}	—	April 14, 2004	Kitt Peak	Spacewatch	·	1.4 km	MPC · JPL
276765	2004 GB_{45}	—	April 12, 2004	Kitt Peak	Spacewatch	·	1.7 km	MPC · JPL
276766	2004 GM_{60}	—	April 14, 2004	Kitt Peak	Spacewatch	·	1.5 km	MPC · JPL
276767	2004 GM_{64}	—	April 13, 2004	Kitt Peak	Spacewatch	V	1.0 km	MPC · JPL
276768	2004 GR_{71}	—	April 14, 2004	Kitt Peak	Spacewatch	·	2.0 km	MPC · JPL
276769	2004 GO_{87}	—	April 15, 2004	Socorro	LINEAR	PHO	1.3 km	MPC · JPL
276770	2004 HC	—	April 16, 2004	Socorro	LINEAR	ATE	370 m	MPC · JPL
276771	2004 HN_{18}	—	April 17, 2004	Palomar	NEAT	·	1.3 km	MPC · JPL
276772	2004 HG_{28}	—	April 20, 2004	Socorro	LINEAR	·	1.1 km	MPC · JPL
276773	2004 HT_{34}	—	April 19, 2004	Kitt Peak	Spacewatch	·	830 m	MPC · JPL
276774	2004 HG_{38}	—	April 23, 2004	Socorro	LINEAR	·	1.4 km	MPC · JPL
276775	2004 HS_{48}	—	April 22, 2004	Siding Spring	SSS	·	1.1 km	MPC · JPL
276776	2004 HU_{49}	—	April 23, 2004	Socorro	LINEAR	·	1.3 km	MPC · JPL
276777	2004 HW_{59}	—	April 22, 2004	Socorro	LINEAR	·	1.1 km	MPC · JPL
276778	2004 HD_{65}	—	April 16, 2004	Palomar	NEAT	NYS	1.2 km	MPC · JPL
276779	2004 JO_{13}	—	May 8, 2004	Palomar	NEAT	·	1.5 km	MPC · JPL
276780	2004 JR_{13}	—	May 9, 2004	Kitt Peak	Spacewatch	(2076)	950 m	MPC · JPL
276781 Montchaibeux	2004 JW_{16}	Montchaibeux	May 11, 2004	Vicques	M. Ory	V	820 m	MPC · JPL
276782	2004 JP_{28}	—	May 11, 2004	Anderson Mesa	LONEOS	ERI	1.8 km	MPC · JPL
276783	2004 JE_{33}	—	May 15, 2004	Socorro	LINEAR	V	750 m	MPC · JPL
276784	2004 JC_{43}	—	May 15, 2004	Socorro	LINEAR	·	1.6 km	MPC · JPL
276785	2004 KA_{1}	—	May 19, 2004	Kitt Peak	Spacewatch	·	570 m	MPC · JPL
276786	2004 KD_{1}	—	May 18, 2004	Catalina	CSS	AMO +1km	1.7 km	MPC · JPL
276787	2004 KV_{5}	—	May 17, 2004	Socorro	LINEAR	PHO	1.0 km	MPC · JPL
276788	2004 KR_{18}	—	May 20, 2004	Siding Spring	SSS	·	3.6 km	MPC · JPL
276789	2004 LA_{26}	—	June 15, 2004	Socorro	LINEAR	·	1.7 km	MPC · JPL
276790	2004 NQ_{5}	—	July 11, 2004	Socorro	LINEAR	·	1.6 km	MPC · JPL
276791	2004 NT_{6}	—	July 11, 2004	Socorro	LINEAR	·	1.9 km	MPC · JPL
276792	2004 NO_{14}	—	July 11, 2004	Socorro	LINEAR	·	1.4 km	MPC · JPL
276793	2004 NS_{15}	—	July 11, 2004	Socorro	LINEAR	NYS	1.7 km	MPC · JPL
276794	2004 NC_{23}	—	July 11, 2004	Socorro	LINEAR	PHO	4.4 km	MPC · JPL
276795	2004 NT_{30}	—	July 9, 2004	Anderson Mesa	LONEOS	·	1.5 km	MPC · JPL
276796	2004 NB_{31}	—	July 9, 2004	Anderson Mesa	LONEOS	·	2.3 km	MPC · JPL
276797	2004 OW_{5}	—	July 18, 2004	Reedy Creek	J. Broughton	·	1.9 km	MPC · JPL
276798	2004 OA_{12}	—	July 16, 2004	Reedy Creek	J. Broughton	NYS	1.2 km	MPC · JPL
276799	2004 OD_{12}	—	July 21, 2004	Reedy Creek	J. Broughton	·	1.5 km	MPC · JPL
276800	2004 OJ_{12}	—	July 28, 2004	Bergisch Gladbach	W. Bickel	·	860 m	MPC · JPL

== 276801–276900 ==
back to top

Designation			Discovery			Properties		Ref
Permanent	Provisional	Named after	Date	Site	Discoverer(s)	Category	Diam.	Ref
276801	2004 PM	—	August 5, 2004	Palomar	NEAT	·	3.5 km	MPC · JPL
276802	2004 PZ_{2}	—	August 3, 2004	Siding Spring	SSS	MAS	780 m	MPC · JPL
276803	2004 PJ_{10}	—	August 6, 2004	Campo Imperatore	CINEOS	MAS	980 m	MPC · JPL
276804	2004 PU_{10}	—	August 7, 2004	Palomar	NEAT	·	1.3 km	MPC · JPL
276805	2004 PT_{18}	—	August 8, 2004	Anderson Mesa	LONEOS	·	1.3 km	MPC · JPL
276806	2004 PQ_{19}	—	August 8, 2004	Anderson Mesa	LONEOS	·	1.4 km	MPC · JPL
276807	2004 PP_{21}	—	August 8, 2004	Palomar	NEAT	·	1.8 km	MPC · JPL
276808	2004 PD_{24}	—	August 8, 2004	Socorro	LINEAR	NYS	1.6 km	MPC · JPL
276809	2004 PE_{28}	—	August 5, 2004	Palomar	NEAT	DOR	2.9 km	MPC · JPL
276810	2004 PL_{29}	—	August 7, 2004	Palomar	NEAT	·	1.5 km	MPC · JPL
276811	2004 PF_{31}	—	August 8, 2004	Socorro	LINEAR	EUN	1.4 km	MPC · JPL
276812	2004 PN_{33}	—	August 8, 2004	Socorro	LINEAR	MIS	2.9 km	MPC · JPL
276813	2004 PZ_{39}	—	August 9, 2004	Anderson Mesa	LONEOS	GEF	1.9 km	MPC · JPL
276814	2004 PK_{53}	—	August 8, 2004	Socorro	LINEAR	·	1.3 km	MPC · JPL
276815	2004 PY_{57}	—	August 9, 2004	Socorro	LINEAR	·	1.4 km	MPC · JPL
276816	2004 PQ_{58}	—	August 9, 2004	Socorro	LINEAR	(5)	1.4 km	MPC · JPL
276817	2004 PX_{60}	—	August 9, 2004	Socorro	LINEAR	·	1.9 km	MPC · JPL
276818	2004 PU_{69}	—	August 7, 2004	Palomar	NEAT	·	2.4 km	MPC · JPL
276819	2004 PZ_{75}	—	August 9, 2004	Socorro	LINEAR	PHO	1.5 km	MPC · JPL
276820	2004 PR_{81}	—	August 10, 2004	Socorro	LINEAR	MAS	900 m	MPC · JPL
276821	2004 PJ_{82}	—	August 10, 2004	Socorro	LINEAR	·	1.8 km	MPC · JPL
276822	2004 PL_{91}	—	August 11, 2004	Socorro	LINEAR	·	2.2 km	MPC · JPL
276823	2004 PN_{98}	—	August 8, 2004	Socorro	LINEAR	ERI	1.9 km	MPC · JPL
276824	2004 PV_{98}	—	August 8, 2004	Socorro	LINEAR	·	2.7 km	MPC · JPL
276825	2004 PM_{101}	—	August 11, 2004	Socorro	LINEAR	·	1.0 km	MPC · JPL
276826	2004 PT_{101}	—	August 11, 2004	Socorro	LINEAR	·	2.4 km	MPC · JPL
276827	2004 PD_{103}	—	August 12, 2004	Socorro	LINEAR	·	2.2 km	MPC · JPL
276828	2004 PN_{103}	—	August 12, 2004	Socorro	LINEAR	(5)	2.0 km	MPC · JPL
276829	2004 PQ_{108}	—	August 9, 2004	Socorro	LINEAR	·	1.9 km	MPC · JPL
276830	2004 PF_{113}	—	August 3, 2004	Siding Spring	SSS	·	1.4 km	MPC · JPL
276831	2004 QW_{2}	—	August 20, 2004	Kitt Peak	Spacewatch	·	1.3 km	MPC · JPL
276832	2004 QC_{5}	—	August 21, 2004	Reedy Creek	J. Broughton	·	1.6 km	MPC · JPL
276833	2004 QW_{14}	—	August 21, 2004	Catalina	CSS	·	1.4 km	MPC · JPL
276834	2004 QW_{26}	—	August 21, 2004	Catalina	CSS	·	3.3 km	MPC · JPL
276835	2004 RK_{2}	—	September 6, 2004	Socorro	LINEAR	H	730 m	MPC · JPL
276836	2004 RL_{2}	—	September 6, 2004	Socorro	LINEAR	H	740 m	MPC · JPL
276837	2004 RC_{5}	—	September 4, 2004	Palomar	NEAT	·	1.3 km	MPC · JPL
276838	2004 RP_{13}	—	September 6, 2004	Needville	Needville	·	1.8 km	MPC · JPL
276839	2004 RN_{14}	—	September 6, 2004	Siding Spring	SSS	·	1.5 km	MPC · JPL
276840	2004 RL_{15}	—	September 7, 2004	Socorro	LINEAR	·	2.0 km	MPC · JPL
276841	2004 RR_{18}	—	September 7, 2004	Kitt Peak	Spacewatch	·	2.4 km	MPC · JPL
276842	2004 RZ_{20}	—	September 7, 2004	Kitt Peak	Spacewatch	·	2.5 km	MPC · JPL
276843	2004 RY_{22}	—	September 7, 2004	Kitt Peak	Spacewatch	·	1.2 km	MPC · JPL
276844	2004 RB_{35}	—	September 7, 2004	Socorro	LINEAR	·	2.8 km	MPC · JPL
276845	2004 RS_{44}	—	September 8, 2004	Socorro	LINEAR	MAR	1.1 km	MPC · JPL
276846	2004 RJ_{48}	—	September 8, 2004	Socorro	LINEAR	·	1.4 km	MPC · JPL
276847	2004 RW_{51}	—	September 8, 2004	Socorro	LINEAR	PHO	1.4 km	MPC · JPL
276848	2004 RK_{64}	—	September 8, 2004	Socorro	LINEAR	·	3.0 km	MPC · JPL
276849	2004 RW_{78}	—	September 8, 2004	Palomar	NEAT	·	1.5 km	MPC · JPL
276850	2004 RE_{79}	—	September 8, 2004	Palomar	NEAT	KOR	1.6 km	MPC · JPL
276851	2004 RU_{86}	—	September 7, 2004	Socorro	LINEAR	·	2.2 km	MPC · JPL
276852	2004 RK_{91}	—	September 8, 2004	Socorro	LINEAR	·	1.4 km	MPC · JPL
276853	2004 RA_{93}	—	September 8, 2004	Socorro	LINEAR	·	1.7 km	MPC · JPL
276854	2004 RJ_{107}	—	September 9, 2004	Socorro	LINEAR	·	3.5 km	MPC · JPL
276855	2004 RB_{126}	—	September 7, 2004	Kitt Peak	Spacewatch	·	2.9 km	MPC · JPL
276856	2004 RK_{130}	—	September 7, 2004	Kitt Peak	Spacewatch	·	1.8 km	MPC · JPL
276857	2004 RX_{137}	—	September 8, 2004	Palomar	NEAT	PHO	1.2 km	MPC · JPL
276858	2004 RN_{145}	—	September 9, 2004	Socorro	LINEAR	·	1.1 km	MPC · JPL
276859	2004 RG_{147}	—	September 9, 2004	Socorro	LINEAR	·	2.0 km	MPC · JPL
276860	2004 RD_{148}	—	September 9, 2004	Socorro	LINEAR	·	3.0 km	MPC · JPL
276861	2004 RX_{149}	—	September 9, 2004	Socorro	LINEAR	·	2.1 km	MPC · JPL
276862	2004 RN_{153}	—	September 10, 2004	Socorro	LINEAR	·	2.3 km	MPC · JPL
276863	2004 RW_{154}	—	September 10, 2004	Socorro	LINEAR	MAR	860 m	MPC · JPL
276864	2004 RZ_{158}	—	September 10, 2004	Socorro	LINEAR	·	2.3 km	MPC · JPL
276865	2004 RC_{168}	—	September 8, 2004	Socorro	LINEAR	·	2.0 km	MPC · JPL
276866	2004 RH_{169}	—	September 8, 2004	Socorro	LINEAR	·	1.4 km	MPC · JPL
276867	2004 RG_{171}	—	September 9, 2004	Socorro	LINEAR	·	2.2 km	MPC · JPL
276868	2004 RQ_{182}	—	September 10, 2004	Socorro	LINEAR	·	1.5 km	MPC · JPL
276869	2004 RP_{188}	—	September 10, 2004	Socorro	LINEAR	·	2.5 km	MPC · JPL
276870	2004 RO_{190}	—	September 10, 2004	Socorro	LINEAR	·	2.1 km	MPC · JPL
276871	2004 RT_{201}	—	September 10, 2004	Kitt Peak	Spacewatch	(5)	1.1 km	MPC · JPL
276872	2004 RA_{207}	—	September 11, 2004	Socorro	LINEAR	·	1.6 km	MPC · JPL
276873	2004 RV_{222}	—	September 14, 2004	Socorro	LINEAR	T_{j} (2.91)	4.5 km	MPC · JPL
276874	2004 RU_{228}	—	September 9, 2004	Kitt Peak	Spacewatch	·	1.4 km	MPC · JPL
276875	2004 RR_{235}	—	September 10, 2004	Kitt Peak	Spacewatch	·	1.5 km	MPC · JPL
276876	2004 RU_{236}	—	September 10, 2004	Kitt Peak	Spacewatch	WIT	1.1 km	MPC · JPL
276877	2004 RY_{238}	—	September 10, 2004	Kitt Peak	Spacewatch	·	1.9 km	MPC · JPL
276878	2004 RW_{240}	—	September 10, 2004	Kitt Peak	Spacewatch	·	1.8 km	MPC · JPL
276879	2004 RJ_{243}	—	September 10, 2004	Kitt Peak	Spacewatch	·	2.2 km	MPC · JPL
276880	2004 RV_{252}	—	September 15, 2004	Socorro	LINEAR	H	880 m	MPC · JPL
276881	2004 RS_{253}	—	September 6, 2004	Palomar	NEAT	·	2.2 km	MPC · JPL
276882	2004 RZ_{273}	—	September 11, 2004	Kitt Peak	Spacewatch	·	1.4 km	MPC · JPL
276883	2004 RH_{277}	—	September 13, 2004	Socorro	LINEAR	·	3.6 km	MPC · JPL
276884	2004 RC_{286}	—	September 15, 2004	Kitt Peak	Spacewatch	·	1.4 km	MPC · JPL
276885	2004 RS_{306}	—	September 12, 2004	Socorro	LINEAR	·	2.7 km	MPC · JPL
276886	2004 RP_{307}	—	September 13, 2004	Socorro	LINEAR	·	1.7 km	MPC · JPL
276887	2004 RF_{313}	—	September 15, 2004	Kitt Peak	Spacewatch	EUN	1.6 km	MPC · JPL
276888	2004 RM_{323}	—	September 13, 2004	Socorro	LINEAR	·	1.2 km	MPC · JPL
276889	2004 RK_{333}	—	September 15, 2004	Anderson Mesa	LONEOS	·	1.3 km	MPC · JPL
276890	2004 RU_{333}	—	September 15, 2004	Anderson Mesa	LONEOS	·	1.2 km	MPC · JPL
276891	2004 RH_{340}	—	September 15, 2004	Mauna Kea	D. J. Tholen	APO	440 m	MPC · JPL
276892	2004 RD_{341}	—	September 11, 2004	Socorro	LINEAR	TIR	3.8 km	MPC · JPL
276893	2004 RS_{343}	—	September 14, 2004	Palomar	NEAT	·	2.4 km	MPC · JPL
276894	2004 RR_{345}	—	September 7, 2004	Socorro	LINEAR	·	1.7 km	MPC · JPL
276895	2004 RH_{346}	—	September 8, 2004	Socorro	LINEAR	MAS	950 m	MPC · JPL
276896	2004 RX_{346}	—	September 13, 2004	Socorro	LINEAR	·	2.1 km	MPC · JPL
276897	2004 RH_{351}	—	September 11, 2004	Kitt Peak	Spacewatch	MAS	800 m	MPC · JPL
276898	2004 RF_{356}	—	September 15, 2004	Kitt Peak	Spacewatch	·	1.6 km	MPC · JPL
276899	2004 SL_{4}	—	September 17, 2004	Kitt Peak	Spacewatch	·	1.8 km	MPC · JPL
276900	2004 SB_{8}	—	September 17, 2004	Kitt Peak	Spacewatch	·	5.8 km	MPC · JPL

== 276901–277000 ==
back to top

Designation			Discovery			Properties		Ref
Permanent	Provisional	Named after	Date	Site	Discoverer(s)	Category	Diam.	Ref
276901	2004 SF_{11}	—	September 16, 2004	Siding Spring	SSS	·	1.3 km	MPC · JPL
276902	2004 SE_{12}	—	September 16, 2004	Siding Spring	SSS	·	2.1 km	MPC · JPL
276903	2004 SC_{26}	—	September 22, 2004	Three Buttes	Buttes, Three	·	1.7 km	MPC · JPL
276904	2004 SO_{27}	—	September 16, 2004	Kitt Peak	Spacewatch	·	1.2 km	MPC · JPL
276905	2004 SM_{31}	—	September 17, 2004	Socorro	LINEAR	EUN	1.6 km	MPC · JPL
276906	2004 SD_{36}	—	September 17, 2004	Kitt Peak	Spacewatch	(1118)	3.9 km	MPC · JPL
276907	2004 SE_{37}	—	September 17, 2004	Kitt Peak	Spacewatch	·	2.7 km	MPC · JPL
276908	2004 SU_{60}	—	September 24, 2004	Socorro	LINEAR	·	5.9 km	MPC · JPL
276909	2004 TZ_{4}	—	October 4, 2004	Kitt Peak	Spacewatch	·	1.9 km	MPC · JPL
276910	2004 TP_{10}	—	October 7, 2004	Kitt Peak	Spacewatch	H	530 m	MPC · JPL
276911	2004 TZ_{10}	—	October 8, 2004	Socorro	LINEAR	H	650 m	MPC · JPL
276912	2004 TC_{12}	—	October 7, 2004	Goodricke-Pigott	R. A. Tucker	(5)	1.3 km	MPC · JPL
276913	2004 TS_{22}	—	October 4, 2004	Kitt Peak	Spacewatch	·	3.6 km	MPC · JPL
276914	2004 TC_{32}	—	October 4, 2004	Kitt Peak	Spacewatch	·	2.0 km	MPC · JPL
276915	2004 TU_{37}	—	October 4, 2004	Kitt Peak	Spacewatch	·	2.1 km	MPC · JPL
276916	2004 TS_{41}	—	October 4, 2004	Kitt Peak	Spacewatch	MRX	1.5 km	MPC · JPL
276917	2004 TJ_{59}	—	October 5, 2004	Kitt Peak	Spacewatch	·	1.8 km	MPC · JPL
276918	2004 TB_{72}	—	October 6, 2004	Kitt Peak	Spacewatch	·	1.5 km	MPC · JPL
276919	2004 TC_{80}	—	October 5, 2004	Kitt Peak	Spacewatch	·	1.4 km	MPC · JPL
276920	2004 TR_{91}	—	October 5, 2004	Kitt Peak	Spacewatch	·	1.3 km	MPC · JPL
276921	2004 TM_{98}	—	October 5, 2004	Kitt Peak	Spacewatch	·	1.4 km	MPC · JPL
276922	2004 TQ_{109}	—	October 7, 2004	Socorro	LINEAR	·	3.0 km	MPC · JPL
276923	2004 TS_{112}	—	October 7, 2004	Kitt Peak	Spacewatch	·	2.0 km	MPC · JPL
276924	2004 TL_{125}	—	October 7, 2004	Socorro	LINEAR	·	3.7 km	MPC · JPL
276925	2004 TM_{131}	—	October 7, 2004	Anderson Mesa	LONEOS	EUN	2.1 km	MPC · JPL
276926	2004 TL_{133}	—	October 7, 2004	Anderson Mesa	LONEOS	·	2.3 km	MPC · JPL
276927	2004 TQ_{138}	—	October 9, 2004	Anderson Mesa	LONEOS	·	2.6 km	MPC · JPL
276928	2004 TN_{144}	—	October 4, 2004	Kitt Peak	Spacewatch	·	1.6 km	MPC · JPL
276929	2004 TH_{146}	—	October 5, 2004	Kitt Peak	Spacewatch	·	1.7 km	MPC · JPL
276930	2004 TY_{156}	—	October 6, 2004	Kitt Peak	Spacewatch	KON	3.0 km	MPC · JPL
276931	2004 TN_{161}	—	October 6, 2004	Kitt Peak	Spacewatch	·	1.8 km	MPC · JPL
276932	2004 TU_{161}	—	October 6, 2004	Kitt Peak	Spacewatch	·	2.0 km	MPC · JPL
276933	2004 TX_{176}	—	October 4, 2004	Kitt Peak	Spacewatch	NYS	1.2 km	MPC · JPL
276934	2004 TT_{188}	—	October 7, 2004	Kitt Peak	Spacewatch	·	3.5 km	MPC · JPL
276935	2004 TY_{200}	—	October 7, 2004	Kitt Peak	Spacewatch	·	2.6 km	MPC · JPL
276936	2004 TJ_{206}	—	October 7, 2004	Kitt Peak	Spacewatch	·	2.4 km	MPC · JPL
276937	2004 TY_{210}	—	October 8, 2004	Kitt Peak	Spacewatch	·	1.9 km	MPC · JPL
276938	2004 TK_{211}	—	October 8, 2004	Kitt Peak	Spacewatch	·	1.7 km	MPC · JPL
276939	2004 TL_{214}	—	October 9, 2004	Kitt Peak	Spacewatch	·	2.4 km	MPC · JPL
276940	2004 TR_{228}	—	October 8, 2004	Kitt Peak	Spacewatch	·	1.4 km	MPC · JPL
276941	2004 TR_{230}	—	October 8, 2004	Anderson Mesa	LONEOS	·	3.0 km	MPC · JPL
276942	2004 TE_{239}	—	October 9, 2004	Kitt Peak	Spacewatch	·	1.7 km	MPC · JPL
276943	2004 TK_{241}	—	October 10, 2004	Socorro	LINEAR	·	2.6 km	MPC · JPL
276944	2004 TX_{251}	—	October 9, 2004	Kitt Peak	Spacewatch	CYB	3.0 km	MPC · JPL
276945	2004 TJ_{255}	—	October 9, 2004	Kitt Peak	Spacewatch	·	1.9 km	MPC · JPL
276946	2004 TU_{266}	—	October 9, 2004	Kitt Peak	Spacewatch	·	1.8 km	MPC · JPL
276947	2004 TL_{272}	—	October 9, 2004	Kitt Peak	Spacewatch	·	2.1 km	MPC · JPL
276948	2004 TL_{279}	—	October 10, 2004	Socorro	LINEAR	·	3.5 km	MPC · JPL
276949	2004 TC_{284}	—	October 8, 2004	Kitt Peak	Spacewatch	·	1.4 km	MPC · JPL
276950	2004 TM_{284}	—	October 8, 2004	Kitt Peak	Spacewatch	·	1.2 km	MPC · JPL
276951	2004 TB_{286}	—	October 8, 2004	Kitt Peak	Spacewatch	·	1.7 km	MPC · JPL
276952	2004 TU_{286}	—	October 9, 2004	Socorro	LINEAR	·	2.6 km	MPC · JPL
276953	2004 TT_{295}	—	October 10, 2004	Kitt Peak	Spacewatch	MRX	1.4 km	MPC · JPL
276954	2004 TD_{297}	—	October 11, 2004	Kitt Peak	Spacewatch	GEF	1.7 km	MPC · JPL
276955	2004 TB_{300}	—	October 8, 2004	Kitt Peak	Spacewatch	·	1.9 km	MPC · JPL
276956	2004 TY_{314}	—	October 11, 2004	Kitt Peak	Spacewatch	·	1.7 km	MPC · JPL
276957	2004 TF_{328}	—	October 4, 2004	Palomar	NEAT	·	1.6 km	MPC · JPL
276958	2004 TY_{328}	—	October 4, 2004	Palomar	NEAT	·	3.7 km	MPC · JPL
276959	2004 TE_{329}	—	October 8, 2004	Kitt Peak	Spacewatch	·	1.1 km	MPC · JPL
276960	2004 TO_{339}	—	October 13, 2004	Kitt Peak	Spacewatch	·	2.5 km	MPC · JPL
276961	2004 TX_{342}	—	October 13, 2004	Kitt Peak	Spacewatch	AEO	1.5 km	MPC · JPL
276962	2004 TJ_{343}	—	October 14, 2004	Socorro	LINEAR	·	3.0 km	MPC · JPL
276963	2004 TB_{369}	—	October 11, 2004	Kitt Peak	Spacewatch	·	1.8 km	MPC · JPL
276964	2004 TQ_{369}	—	October 11, 2004	Kitt Peak	Spacewatch	·	3.2 km	MPC · JPL
276965	2004 UU_{2}	—	October 18, 2004	Socorro	LINEAR	·	2.2 km	MPC · JPL
276966	2004 UE_{3}	—	October 18, 2004	Socorro	LINEAR	ADE	2.2 km	MPC · JPL
276967	2004 UH_{4}	—	October 16, 2004	Socorro	LINEAR	TIR	3.3 km	MPC · JPL
276968	2004 UZ_{10}	—	October 19, 2004	Socorro	LINEAR	·	2.8 km	MPC · JPL
276969	2004 VQ_{19}	—	November 4, 2004	Anderson Mesa	LONEOS	MAR	1.7 km	MPC · JPL
276970	2004 VG_{21}	—	November 4, 2004	Catalina	CSS	·	1.9 km	MPC · JPL
276971	2004 VL_{21}	—	November 4, 2004	Catalina	CSS	EUN	1.6 km	MPC · JPL
276972	2004 VE_{30}	—	November 3, 2004	Kitt Peak	Spacewatch	·	1.8 km	MPC · JPL
276973	2004 VT_{41}	—	November 4, 2004	Kitt Peak	Spacewatch	·	1.7 km	MPC · JPL
276974	2004 VY_{53}	—	November 7, 2004	Socorro	LINEAR	·	3.1 km	MPC · JPL
276975 Heller	2004 VU_{69}	Heller	November 11, 2004	Piszkéstető	K. Sárneczky	·	2.6 km	MPC · JPL
276976	2004 VR_{70}	—	November 4, 2004	Catalina	CSS	AEO	1.5 km	MPC · JPL
276977	2004 VM_{74}	—	November 12, 2004	Catalina	CSS	·	2.0 km	MPC · JPL
276978	2004 VJ_{77}	—	November 12, 2004	Catalina	CSS	·	2.5 km	MPC · JPL
276979	2004 VE_{90}	—	November 11, 2004	Kitt Peak	Spacewatch	·	4.2 km	MPC · JPL
276980	2004 VJ_{94}	—	November 10, 2004	Kitt Peak	M. W. Buie	·	1.6 km	MPC · JPL
276981	2004 WK	—	November 17, 2004	Siding Spring	SSS	·	3.4 km	MPC · JPL
276982	2004 WD_{1}	—	November 17, 2004	Campo Imperatore	CINEOS	·	2.4 km	MPC · JPL
276983	2004 WM_{7}	—	November 19, 2004	Socorro	LINEAR	·	3.1 km	MPC · JPL
276984	2004 WG_{11}	—	November 20, 2004	Kitt Peak	Spacewatch	·	2.2 km	MPC · JPL
276985	2004 XO_{19}	—	December 8, 2004	Socorro	LINEAR	·	5.6 km	MPC · JPL
276986	2004 XW_{21}	—	December 8, 2004	Socorro	LINEAR	·	3.4 km	MPC · JPL
276987	2004 XH_{26}	—	December 9, 2004	Kitt Peak	Spacewatch	·	3.2 km	MPC · JPL
276988	2004 XQ_{26}	—	December 10, 2004	Kitt Peak	Spacewatch	(5)	1.6 km	MPC · JPL
276989	2004 XB_{27}	—	December 10, 2004	Socorro	LINEAR	·	3.2 km	MPC · JPL
276990	2004 XD_{30}	—	December 10, 2004	Campo Imperatore	CINEOS	NEM	2.9 km	MPC · JPL
276991	2004 XE_{32}	—	December 10, 2004	Socorro	LINEAR	·	4.0 km	MPC · JPL
276992	2004 XF_{38}	—	December 7, 2004	Socorro	LINEAR	·	4.6 km	MPC · JPL
276993	2004 XR_{40}	—	December 11, 2004	Socorro	LINEAR	WIT	1.6 km	MPC · JPL
276994	2004 XN_{43}	—	December 10, 2004	Socorro	LINEAR	KON	3.5 km	MPC · JPL
276995	2004 XQ_{46}	—	December 9, 2004	Kitt Peak	Spacewatch	KOR	1.8 km	MPC · JPL
276996	2004 XA_{47}	—	December 9, 2004	Kitt Peak	Spacewatch	·	4.3 km	MPC · JPL
276997	2004 XA_{51}	—	December 14, 2004	Campo Imperatore	CINEOS	·	2.7 km	MPC · JPL
276998	2004 XE_{52}	—	December 13, 2004	Socorro	LINEAR	·	4.2 km	MPC · JPL
276999	2004 XA_{55}	—	December 10, 2004	Socorro	LINEAR	·	2.2 km	MPC · JPL
277000	2004 XM_{72}	—	December 14, 2004	Kitt Peak	Spacewatch	·	2.1 km	MPC · JPL

back to top

== See also ==
- Meanings of minor-planet names: 276001–277000
