= List of minor planets: 277001–278000 =

The following is a partial list of minor planets, running from minor-planet number 277001 through 278000, inclusive. The primary data for this and other partial lists is based on JPL's "Small-Body Orbital Elements" and data available from the Minor Planet Center. Critical list information is also provided by the MPC, unless otherwise specified from Lowell Observatory. A detailed description of the table's columns and additional sources are given on the main page including a complete list of every page in this series, and a statistical break-up on the dynamical classification of minor planets.

Also see the summary list of all named bodies in numerical and alphabetical order, and the corresponding naming citations for the number range of this particular list. New namings may only be added to this list after official publication, as the preannouncement of names is condemned by the Working Group for Small Bodies Nomenclature of the International Astronomical Union.

Near-Earth obj.	MBA (inner)	MBA (outer)	Centaur
Mars-crosser	MBA (middle)	Jupiter trojan	Trans-Neptunian obj.
Unclassified

== 277001–277100 ==
Designation			Discovery			Properties		Ref
Permanent	Provisional	Named after	Date	Site	Discoverer(s)	Category	Diam.	Ref
277001	2004 XW_{72}	—	December 9, 2004	Catalina	CSS	·	2.2 km	MPC · JPL
277002	2004 XX_{72}	—	December 9, 2004	Catalina	CSS	·	3.3 km	MPC · JPL
277003	2004 XY_{75}	—	December 10, 2004	Kitt Peak	Spacewatch	·	3.1 km	MPC · JPL
277004	2004 XK_{79}	—	December 10, 2004	Socorro	LINEAR	·	2.7 km	MPC · JPL
277005	2004 XC_{106}	—	December 11, 2004	Socorro	LINEAR	·	2.6 km	MPC · JPL
277006	2004 XP_{117}	—	December 12, 2004	Kitt Peak	Spacewatch	BRA	2.0 km	MPC · JPL
277007	2004 XP_{120}	—	December 14, 2004	Socorro	LINEAR	·	2.7 km	MPC · JPL
277008	2004 XV_{130}	—	December 14, 2004	Campo Imperatore	CINEOS	H	730 m	MPC · JPL
277009	2004 XA_{134}	—	December 15, 2004	Socorro	LINEAR	·	1.9 km	MPC · JPL
277010	2004 XJ_{135}	—	December 15, 2004	Socorro	LINEAR	(5)	1.9 km	MPC · JPL
277011	2004 YZ_{21}	—	December 18, 2004	Mount Lemmon	Mount Lemmon Survey	·	2.6 km	MPC · JPL
277012	2004 YH_{35}	—	December 18, 2004	Mount Lemmon	Mount Lemmon Survey	KOR	1.4 km	MPC · JPL
277013	2005 AW_{16}	—	January 6, 2005	Socorro	LINEAR	·	3.4 km	MPC · JPL
277014	2005 AG_{17}	—	January 6, 2005	Socorro	LINEAR	WAT	2.8 km	MPC · JPL
277015	2005 AN_{32}	—	January 11, 2005	Socorro	LINEAR	·	4.6 km	MPC · JPL
277016	2005 AK_{33}	—	January 13, 2005	Kitt Peak	Spacewatch	·	3.4 km	MPC · JPL
277017	2005 AL_{37}	—	January 13, 2005	Kitt Peak	Spacewatch	·	2.8 km	MPC · JPL
277018	2005 AC_{44}	—	January 15, 2005	Kitt Peak	Spacewatch	·	2.8 km	MPC · JPL
277019	2005 AS_{56}	—	January 15, 2005	Catalina	CSS	·	4.1 km	MPC · JPL
277020	2005 AV_{57}	—	January 15, 2005	Catalina	CSS	·	2.9 km	MPC · JPL
277021	2005 AR_{68}	—	January 13, 2005	Kitt Peak	Spacewatch	·	820 m	MPC · JPL
277022	2005 AO_{75}	—	January 15, 2005	Kitt Peak	Spacewatch	615	1.7 km	MPC · JPL
277023	2005 AA_{81}	—	January 15, 2005	Kitt Peak	Spacewatch	·	3.3 km	MPC · JPL
277024	2005 AG_{82}	—	January 15, 2005	Kitt Peak	Spacewatch	·	5.3 km	MPC · JPL
277025	2005 BD_{4}	—	January 16, 2005	Kitt Peak	Spacewatch	HOF	3.7 km	MPC · JPL
277026	2005 BA_{8}	—	January 16, 2005	Socorro	LINEAR	·	3.1 km	MPC · JPL
277027	2005 CW_{1}	—	February 1, 2005	Palomar	NEAT	·	3.3 km	MPC · JPL
277028	2005 CO_{5}	—	February 1, 2005	Palomar	NEAT	·	4.0 km	MPC · JPL
277029	2005 CG_{7}	—	February 4, 2005	Wrightwood	J. W. Young	·	3.6 km	MPC · JPL
277030	2005 CM_{10}	—	February 1, 2005	Kitt Peak	Spacewatch	·	2.4 km	MPC · JPL
277031	2005 CQ_{13}	—	February 2, 2005	Kitt Peak	Spacewatch	·	2.8 km	MPC · JPL
277032	2005 CK_{21}	—	February 2, 2005	Catalina	CSS	·	5.4 km	MPC · JPL
277033	2005 CR_{24}	—	February 4, 2005	Palomar	NEAT	·	2.5 km	MPC · JPL
277034	2005 CA_{29}	—	February 1, 2005	Kitt Peak	Spacewatch	EOS	3.6 km	MPC · JPL
277035	2005 CK_{30}	—	February 1, 2005	Kitt Peak	Spacewatch	·	1.2 km	MPC · JPL
277036	2005 CO_{33}	—	February 2, 2005	Kitt Peak	Spacewatch	·	1.9 km	MPC · JPL
277037	2005 CT_{37}	—	February 7, 2005	Bareggio	Bareggio	·	4.4 km	MPC · JPL
277038	2005 CK_{39}	—	February 9, 2005	La Silla	A. Boattini, H. Scholl	EOS	2.4 km	MPC · JPL
277039	2005 CF_{41}	—	February 9, 2005	Mount Lemmon	Mount Lemmon Survey	APO	680 m	MPC · JPL
277040	2005 CQ_{48}	—	February 2, 2005	Socorro	LINEAR	EUP	5.2 km	MPC · JPL
277041	2005 CT_{57}	—	February 2, 2005	Socorro	LINEAR	·	2.4 km	MPC · JPL
277042	2005 CK_{60}	—	February 4, 2005	Socorro	LINEAR	·	1.0 km	MPC · JPL
277043	2005 CB_{62}	—	February 12, 2005	Cordell-Lorenz	D. T. Durig	T_{j} (2.99)	5.1 km	MPC · JPL
277044	2005 CB_{66}	—	February 9, 2005	Kitt Peak	Spacewatch	·	3.0 km	MPC · JPL
277045	2005 CC_{81}	—	February 9, 2005	Campo Imperatore	CINEOS	·	2.9 km	MPC · JPL
277046	2005 DO_{3}	—	February 16, 2005	La Silla	A. Boattini, H. Scholl	·	4.0 km	MPC · JPL
277047	2005 ES_{18}	—	March 3, 2005	Kitt Peak	Spacewatch	·	3.5 km	MPC · JPL
277048	2005 EM_{22}	—	March 3, 2005	Catalina	CSS	·	4.6 km	MPC · JPL
277049	2005 EP_{25}	—	March 3, 2005	Catalina	CSS	·	3.7 km	MPC · JPL
277050	2005 EZ_{27}	—	March 3, 2005	Socorro	LINEAR	·	6.1 km	MPC · JPL
277051	2005 EU_{31}	—	March 3, 2005	Kitt Peak	Spacewatch	EOS	1.7 km	MPC · JPL
277052	2005 EE_{33}	—	March 2, 2005	Socorro	LINEAR	H	1.0 km	MPC · JPL
277053	2005 EO_{37}	—	March 4, 2005	Junk Bond	Junk Bond	EOS	2.0 km	MPC · JPL
277054	2005 EB_{48}	—	March 3, 2005	Catalina	CSS	·	3.2 km	MPC · JPL
277055	2005 ET_{55}	—	March 4, 2005	Kitt Peak	Spacewatch	·	2.4 km	MPC · JPL
277056	2005 ES_{62}	—	March 4, 2005	Mount Lemmon	Mount Lemmon Survey	THM	2.4 km	MPC · JPL
277057	2005 EN_{65}	—	March 4, 2005	Mount Lemmon	Mount Lemmon Survey	EOS	2.6 km	MPC · JPL
277058	2005 EO_{74}	—	March 3, 2005	Catalina	CSS	·	2.7 km	MPC · JPL
277059	2005 EP_{75}	—	March 3, 2005	Kitt Peak	Spacewatch	·	2.8 km	MPC · JPL
277060	2005 EB_{79}	—	March 3, 2005	Catalina	CSS	HYG	4.1 km	MPC · JPL
277061	2005 ED_{81}	—	March 4, 2005	Kitt Peak	Spacewatch	·	3.0 km	MPC · JPL
277062	2005 EE_{83}	—	March 4, 2005	Kitt Peak	Spacewatch	·	4.1 km	MPC · JPL
277063	2005 EZ_{84}	—	March 4, 2005	Catalina	CSS	TIR	4.6 km	MPC · JPL
277064	2005 ET_{85}	—	March 4, 2005	Socorro	LINEAR	·	2.8 km	MPC · JPL
277065	2005 EX_{88}	—	March 8, 2005	Kitt Peak	Spacewatch	·	5.4 km	MPC · JPL
277066	2005 EC_{93}	—	March 8, 2005	Socorro	LINEAR	·	4.5 km	MPC · JPL
277067	2005 EM_{108}	—	March 4, 2005	Catalina	CSS	·	3.6 km	MPC · JPL
277068	2005 EG_{112}	—	March 4, 2005	Socorro	LINEAR	TIR ·	4.4 km	MPC · JPL
277069	2005 EK_{112}	—	March 4, 2005	Socorro	LINEAR	EOS	2.3 km	MPC · JPL
277070	2005 EU_{115}	—	March 4, 2005	Mount Lemmon	Mount Lemmon Survey	·	3.2 km	MPC · JPL
277071	2005 EZ_{117}	—	March 7, 2005	Socorro	LINEAR	·	5.0 km	MPC · JPL
277072	2005 EF_{127}	—	March 9, 2005	Kitt Peak	Spacewatch	·	3.3 km	MPC · JPL
277073	2005 EC_{133}	—	March 9, 2005	Catalina	CSS	·	2.5 km	MPC · JPL
277074	2005 EZ_{139}	—	March 9, 2005	Socorro	LINEAR	·	4.5 km	MPC · JPL
277075	2005 EB_{143}	—	March 10, 2005	Catalina	CSS	·	4.5 km	MPC · JPL
277076	2005 EB_{153}	—	March 1, 2005	Catalina	CSS	·	2.8 km	MPC · JPL
277077	2005 EU_{153}	—	March 9, 2005	Catalina	CSS	EUP	4.8 km	MPC · JPL
277078	2005 EV_{153}	—	March 9, 2005	Catalina	CSS	EUP	6.3 km	MPC · JPL
277079	2005 EY_{156}	—	March 9, 2005	Mount Lemmon	Mount Lemmon Survey	·	3.1 km	MPC · JPL
277080	2005 EU_{164}	—	March 11, 2005	Kitt Peak	Spacewatch	LIX	4.1 km	MPC · JPL
277081	2005 EK_{169}	—	March 3, 2005	Catalina	CSS	H	730 m	MPC · JPL
277082	2005 EH_{173}	—	March 8, 2005	Vail-Jarnac	Jarnac	·	3.7 km	MPC · JPL
277083	2005 EK_{176}	—	March 8, 2005	Mount Lemmon	Mount Lemmon Survey	EOS	2.1 km	MPC · JPL
277084	2005 EV_{177}	—	March 9, 2005	Kitt Peak	Spacewatch	(1118)	4.7 km	MPC · JPL
277085	2005 ES_{185}	—	March 10, 2005	Anderson Mesa	LONEOS	LIX	3.9 km	MPC · JPL
277086	2005 ET_{201}	—	March 8, 2005	Catalina	CSS	·	3.5 km	MPC · JPL
277087	2005 EK_{204}	—	March 11, 2005	Kitt Peak	Spacewatch	(3460)	3.6 km	MPC · JPL
277088	2005 EF_{211}	—	March 4, 2005	Catalina	CSS	·	4.5 km	MPC · JPL
277089	2005 EN_{215}	—	March 8, 2005	Kitt Peak	Spacewatch	·	3.1 km	MPC · JPL
277090	2005 EG_{223}	—	March 10, 2005	Catalina	CSS	·	4.0 km	MPC · JPL
277091	2005 EB_{235}	—	March 10, 2005	Mount Lemmon	Mount Lemmon Survey	·	3.1 km	MPC · JPL
277092	2005 EA_{242}	—	March 11, 2005	Catalina	CSS	·	3.2 km	MPC · JPL
277093	2005 EY_{260}	—	March 12, 2005	Socorro	LINEAR	·	3.8 km	MPC · JPL
277094	2005 EN_{261}	—	March 13, 2005	Kitt Peak	Spacewatch	·	3.4 km	MPC · JPL
277095	2005 EV_{267}	—	March 14, 2005	Mount Lemmon	Mount Lemmon Survey	·	4.3 km	MPC · JPL
277096	2005 EF_{269}	—	March 15, 2005	Catalina	CSS	EOS	3.3 km	MPC · JPL
277097	2005 EF_{273}	—	March 3, 2005	Kitt Peak	Spacewatch	·	4.0 km	MPC · JPL
277098	2005 EZ_{281}	—	March 10, 2005	Catalina	CSS	·	5.3 km	MPC · JPL
277099	2005 EX_{293}	—	March 11, 2005	Catalina	CSS	·	5.4 km	MPC · JPL
277100	2005 EW_{295}	—	March 7, 2005	Socorro	LINEAR	·	4.3 km	MPC · JPL

== 277101–277200 ==
back to top

Designation			Discovery			Properties		Ref
Permanent	Provisional	Named after	Date	Site	Discoverer(s)	Category	Diam.	Ref
277101	2005 EB_{331}	—	March 8, 2005	Catalina	CSS	·	3.0 km	MPC · JPL
277102	2005 FG_{1}	—	March 16, 2005	Catalina	CSS	EOS	2.8 km	MPC · JPL
277103	2005 FA_{7}	—	March 30, 2005	Catalina	CSS	·	4.6 km	MPC · JPL
277104	2005 FA_{13}	—	March 18, 2005	Catalina	CSS	·	4.4 km	MPC · JPL
277105	2005 FR_{14}	—	March 16, 2005	Catalina	CSS	VER	4.1 km	MPC · JPL
277106 Forgó	2005 GY	Forgó	April 1, 2005	Piszkéstető	K. Sárneczky	·	3.3 km	MPC · JPL
277107	2005 GA_{1}	—	April 1, 2005	Ottmarsheim	Ottmarsheim	·	4.0 km	MPC · JPL
277108	2005 GQ_{1}	—	April 1, 2005	Catalina	CSS	·	4.6 km	MPC · JPL
277109	2005 GS_{6}	—	April 1, 2005	Kitt Peak	Spacewatch	·	5.3 km	MPC · JPL
277110	2005 GG_{8}	—	April 1, 2005	Socorro	LINEAR	EUP	4.9 km	MPC · JPL
277111	2005 GW_{14}	—	April 2, 2005	Mount Lemmon	Mount Lemmon Survey	EOS	2.5 km	MPC · JPL
277112	2005 GE_{22}	—	April 1, 2005	Anderson Mesa	LONEOS	VER	4.4 km	MPC · JPL
277113	2005 GY_{25}	—	April 2, 2005	Mount Lemmon	Mount Lemmon Survey	·	730 m	MPC · JPL
277114	2005 GT_{28}	—	April 4, 2005	Kitt Peak	Spacewatch	·	6.0 km	MPC · JPL
277115	2005 GC_{29}	—	April 4, 2005	Kitt Peak	Spacewatch	·	4.4 km	MPC · JPL
277116	2005 GJ_{30}	—	April 4, 2005	Catalina	CSS	TIR	4.2 km	MPC · JPL
277117	2005 GW_{46}	—	April 5, 2005	Mount Lemmon	Mount Lemmon Survey	·	3.4 km	MPC · JPL
277118 Zaandam	2005 GS_{59}	Zaandam	April 8, 2005	Mayhill	Lowe, A.	·	4.1 km	MPC · JPL
277119	2005 GH_{62}	—	April 2, 2005	Mount Lemmon	Mount Lemmon Survey	·	4.5 km	MPC · JPL
277120	2005 GU_{68}	—	April 2, 2005	Catalina	CSS	·	5.4 km	MPC · JPL
277121	2005 GF_{69}	—	April 2, 2005	Catalina	CSS	·	4.6 km	MPC · JPL
277122	2005 GM_{80}	—	April 7, 2005	Kitt Peak	Spacewatch	·	4.4 km	MPC · JPL
277123	2005 GO_{85}	—	April 4, 2005	Mount Lemmon	Mount Lemmon Survey	THM	2.3 km	MPC · JPL
277124	2005 GX_{97}	—	April 7, 2005	Kitt Peak	Spacewatch	·	810 m	MPC · JPL
277125	2005 GU_{104}	—	April 10, 2005	Kitt Peak	Spacewatch	·	3.8 km	MPC · JPL
277126	2005 GO_{119}	—	April 9, 2005	Siding Spring	SSS	·	3.3 km	MPC · JPL
277127	2005 GW_{119}	—	April 10, 2005	Mount Lemmon	Mount Lemmon Survey	AMO	630 m	MPC · JPL
277128	2005 GJ_{127}	—	April 12, 2005	Anderson Mesa	LONEOS	·	3.2 km	MPC · JPL
277129	2005 GT_{135}	—	April 10, 2005	Kitt Peak	Spacewatch	·	2.3 km	MPC · JPL
277130	2005 GJ_{161}	—	April 13, 2005	Catalina	CSS	·	5.0 km	MPC · JPL
277131	2005 GR_{196}	—	April 10, 2005	Kitt Peak	M. W. Buie	·	3.9 km	MPC · JPL
277132	2005 GU_{206}	—	April 10, 2005	Catalina	CSS	·	5.1 km	MPC · JPL
277133	2005 GG_{227}	—	April 2, 2005	Mount Lemmon	Mount Lemmon Survey	NYS	1.4 km	MPC · JPL
277134	2005 JE_{5}	—	May 4, 2005	Kitt Peak	Spacewatch	CYB	5.3 km	MPC · JPL
277135	2005 JW_{14}	—	May 2, 2005	Kitt Peak	Spacewatch	TIR	3.5 km	MPC · JPL
277136	2005 JV_{76}	—	May 9, 2005	Socorro	LINEAR	·	3.8 km	MPC · JPL
277137	2005 JG_{118}	—	May 10, 2005	Kitt Peak	Spacewatch	JUN	1.1 km	MPC · JPL
277138	2005 JO_{128}	—	May 13, 2005	Kitt Peak	Spacewatch	HYG	3.6 km	MPC · JPL
277139	2005 KN_{9}	—	May 28, 2005	Reedy Creek	J. Broughton	EUN	1.6 km	MPC · JPL
277140	2005 KP_{13}	—	May 19, 2005	Mount Lemmon	Mount Lemmon Survey	·	890 m	MPC · JPL
277141	2005 LF_{6}	—	June 4, 2005	Socorro	LINEAR	·	5.2 km	MPC · JPL
277142	2005 LG_{8}	—	June 7, 2005	Catalina	CSS	APO +1km	1.6 km	MPC · JPL
277143	2005 LU_{30}	—	June 12, 2005	Kitt Peak	Spacewatch	·	2.5 km	MPC · JPL
277144	2005 LQ_{32}	—	June 9, 2005	Kitt Peak	Spacewatch	·	4.1 km	MPC · JPL
277145	2005 LN_{38}	—	June 11, 2005	Kitt Peak	Spacewatch	·	940 m	MPC · JPL
277146	2005 LW_{43}	—	June 11, 2005	Kitt Peak	Spacewatch	·	970 m	MPC · JPL
277147	2005 MV	—	June 17, 2005	Mount Lemmon	Mount Lemmon Survey	·	1 km	MPC · JPL
277148	2005 MZ_{2}	—	June 18, 2005	Mount Lemmon	Mount Lemmon Survey	·	1.1 km	MPC · JPL
277149	2005 MM_{9}	—	June 28, 2005	Kitt Peak	Spacewatch	·	1.4 km	MPC · JPL
277150	2005 MB_{14}	—	June 28, 2005	Kitt Peak	Spacewatch	·	1.8 km	MPC · JPL
277151	2005 MM_{18}	—	June 28, 2005	Palomar	NEAT	·	720 m	MPC · JPL
277152	2005 MD_{20}	—	June 29, 2005	Kitt Peak	Spacewatch	·	850 m	MPC · JPL
277153	2005 ML_{26}	—	June 28, 2005	Kitt Peak	Spacewatch	V	780 m	MPC · JPL
277154	2005 MM_{26}	—	June 28, 2005	Palomar	NEAT	·	700 m	MPC · JPL
277155	2005 MO_{26}	—	June 28, 2005	Palomar	NEAT	V	730 m	MPC · JPL
277156	2005 MC_{33}	—	June 29, 2005	Kitt Peak	Spacewatch	·	1.0 km	MPC · JPL
277157	2005 MH_{38}	—	June 30, 2005	Kitt Peak	Spacewatch	·	1.0 km	MPC · JPL
277158	2005 MH_{39}	—	June 28, 2005	Palomar	NEAT	·	1.3 km	MPC · JPL
277159	2005 ME_{40}	—	June 30, 2005	Kitt Peak	Spacewatch	·	1.1 km	MPC · JPL
277160	2005 MC_{48}	—	June 29, 2005	Kitt Peak	Spacewatch	·	1.0 km	MPC · JPL
277161	2005 NM_{13}	—	June 28, 2005	Kitt Peak	Spacewatch	·	2.3 km	MPC · JPL
277162	2005 NM_{20}	—	July 5, 2005	Socorro	LINEAR	·	2.1 km	MPC · JPL
277163	2005 NN_{47}	—	July 7, 2005	Kitt Peak	Spacewatch	·	1.5 km	MPC · JPL
277164	2005 NQ_{54}	—	July 10, 2005	Kitt Peak	Spacewatch	·	910 m	MPC · JPL
277165	2005 NU_{58}	—	July 9, 2005	Kitt Peak	Spacewatch	V	840 m	MPC · JPL
277166	2005 NQ_{60}	—	July 10, 2005	Catalina	CSS	·	1.3 km	MPC · JPL
277167	2005 NQ_{70}	—	July 4, 2005	Mount Lemmon	Mount Lemmon Survey	MAS	780 m	MPC · JPL
277168	2005 NB_{72}	—	July 5, 2005	Palomar	NEAT	·	1.5 km	MPC · JPL
277169	2005 NF_{84}	—	July 2, 2005	Kitt Peak	Spacewatch	V	810 m	MPC · JPL
277170	2005 NJ_{101}	—	July 11, 2005	Mount Lemmon	Mount Lemmon Survey	·	900 m	MPC · JPL
277171	2005 NX_{101}	—	July 15, 2005	Kitt Peak	Spacewatch	AGN	1.3 km	MPC · JPL
277172	2005 OB	—	July 16, 2005	Anderson Mesa	LONEOS	·	1.1 km	MPC · JPL
277173	2005 OY_{1}	—	July 16, 2005	Reedy Creek	J. Broughton	·	950 m	MPC · JPL
277174	2005 OT_{10}	—	July 27, 2005	Palomar	NEAT	·	1.2 km	MPC · JPL
277175	2005 OS_{14}	—	July 31, 2005	Siding Spring	SSS	·	900 m	MPC · JPL
277176	2005 OX_{18}	—	July 30, 2005	Palomar	NEAT	·	830 m	MPC · JPL
277177	2005 OU_{22}	—	July 29, 2005	Reedy Creek	J. Broughton	·	1.1 km	MPC · JPL
277178	2005 OE_{25}	—	July 31, 2005	Palomar	NEAT	NYS	1.2 km	MPC · JPL
277179	2005 OB_{26}	—	July 18, 2005	Palomar	NEAT	T_{j} (2.99) · 3:2	6.2 km	MPC · JPL
277180	2005 OB_{27}	—	July 31, 2005	Palomar	NEAT	·	900 m	MPC · JPL
277181	2005 PT	—	August 1, 2005	Siding Spring	SSS	·	2.4 km	MPC · JPL
277182	2005 PF_{1}	—	August 1, 2005	Siding Spring	SSS	V	780 m	MPC · JPL
277183	2005 PL_{10}	—	August 4, 2005	Palomar	NEAT	·	1.4 km	MPC · JPL
277184	2005 PU_{19}	—	October 16, 1995	Kitt Peak	Spacewatch	·	990 m	MPC · JPL
277185	2005 QZ_{6}	—	August 24, 2005	Palomar	NEAT	·	790 m	MPC · JPL
277186	2005 QZ_{13}	—	August 24, 2005	Palomar	NEAT	·	890 m	MPC · JPL
277187	2005 QM_{21}	—	August 26, 2005	Anderson Mesa	LONEOS	·	1.1 km	MPC · JPL
277188	2005 QF_{23}	—	August 27, 2005	Anderson Mesa	LONEOS	·	1.0 km	MPC · JPL
277189	2005 QE_{31}	—	August 22, 2005	Palomar	NEAT	·	1.7 km	MPC · JPL
277190	2005 QT_{31}	—	August 24, 2005	Palomar	NEAT	·	970 m	MPC · JPL
277191	2005 QA_{32}	—	August 24, 2005	Palomar	NEAT	·	760 m	MPC · JPL
277192	2005 QS_{35}	—	August 25, 2005	Palomar	NEAT	·	1.3 km	MPC · JPL
277193	2005 QQ_{36}	—	August 25, 2005	Palomar	NEAT	·	840 m	MPC · JPL
277194	2005 QP_{46}	—	August 26, 2005	Haleakala	NEAT	·	1.4 km	MPC · JPL
277195	2005 QN_{49}	—	August 26, 2005	Palomar	NEAT	·	880 m	MPC · JPL
277196	2005 QV_{49}	—	August 26, 2005	Palomar	NEAT	·	2.0 km	MPC · JPL
277197	2005 QZ_{49}	—	August 26, 2005	Palomar	NEAT	·	1.0 km	MPC · JPL
277198	2005 QQ_{55}	—	August 28, 2005	Kitt Peak	Spacewatch	·	1.0 km	MPC · JPL
277199	2005 QN_{56}	—	August 28, 2005	Siding Spring	SSS	·	880 m	MPC · JPL
277200	2005 QP_{70}	—	August 29, 2005	Socorro	LINEAR	·	1.0 km	MPC · JPL

== 277201–277300 ==
back to top

Designation			Discovery			Properties		Ref
Permanent	Provisional	Named after	Date	Site	Discoverer(s)	Category	Diam.	Ref
277201	2005 QE_{73}	—	August 29, 2005	Kitt Peak	Spacewatch	·	1.0 km	MPC · JPL
277202	2005 QP_{78}	—	August 25, 2005	Palomar	NEAT	·	1.6 km	MPC · JPL
277203	2005 QV_{85}	—	August 30, 2005	Kitt Peak	Spacewatch	PHO	1.4 km	MPC · JPL
277204	2005 QV_{88}	—	August 30, 2005	St. Véran	St. Veran	·	1.4 km	MPC · JPL
277205	2005 QH_{92}	—	August 26, 2005	Anderson Mesa	LONEOS	·	920 m	MPC · JPL
277206	2005 QU_{92}	—	August 26, 2005	Palomar	NEAT	NYS	1.4 km	MPC · JPL
277207	2005 QA_{106}	—	August 27, 2005	Palomar	NEAT	·	980 m	MPC · JPL
277208	2005 QR_{106}	—	July 29, 2005	Palomar	NEAT	·	760 m	MPC · JPL
277209	2005 QS_{109}	—	August 27, 2005	Palomar	NEAT	·	2.0 km	MPC · JPL
277210	2005 QC_{117}	—	August 28, 2005	Kitt Peak	Spacewatch	ERI	2.0 km	MPC · JPL
277211	2005 QN_{130}	—	August 28, 2005	Kitt Peak	Spacewatch	V	700 m	MPC · JPL
277212	2005 QT_{130}	—	August 28, 2005	Kitt Peak	Spacewatch	·	2.3 km	MPC · JPL
277213	2005 QC_{133}	—	August 28, 2005	Kitt Peak	Spacewatch	·	1.2 km	MPC · JPL
277214	2005 QC_{135}	—	August 28, 2005	Kitt Peak	Spacewatch	·	1.1 km	MPC · JPL
277215	2005 QJ_{135}	—	August 28, 2005	Kitt Peak	Spacewatch	·	910 m	MPC · JPL
277216	2005 QS_{139}	—	August 28, 2005	Kitt Peak	Spacewatch	MAS	850 m	MPC · JPL
277217	2005 QH_{143}	—	August 31, 2005	Goodricke-Pigott	R. A. Tucker	·	880 m	MPC · JPL
277218	2005 QF_{147}	—	August 28, 2005	Siding Spring	SSS	·	1.5 km	MPC · JPL
277219	2005 QD_{151}	—	August 30, 2005	Kitt Peak	Spacewatch	MAS	730 m	MPC · JPL
277220	2005 QX_{156}	—	August 30, 2005	Palomar	NEAT	T_{j} (2.97) · 3:2	8.2 km	MPC · JPL
277221	2005 QE_{159}	—	August 27, 2005	Kitt Peak	Spacewatch	ERI	2.4 km	MPC · JPL
277222	2005 QC_{160}	—	August 28, 2005	Anderson Mesa	LONEOS	·	1.5 km	MPC · JPL
277223	2005 QN_{162}	—	August 30, 2005	Palomar	NEAT	·	2.1 km	MPC · JPL
277224	2005 QN_{164}	—	August 31, 2005	Palomar	NEAT	·	1.5 km	MPC · JPL
277225	2005 QH_{165}	—	August 31, 2005	Palomar	NEAT	·	1.1 km	MPC · JPL
277226	2005 QK_{167}	—	August 27, 2005	Anderson Mesa	LONEOS	·	2.7 km	MPC · JPL
277227	2005 QR_{169}	—	August 29, 2005	Palomar	NEAT	·	1.4 km	MPC · JPL
277228	2005 QW_{171}	—	August 29, 2005	Palomar	NEAT	·	890 m	MPC · JPL
277229	2005 QK_{173}	—	August 29, 2005	Palomar	NEAT	·	1.1 km	MPC · JPL
277230	2005 QX_{176}	—	August 26, 2005	Palomar	NEAT	·	1.6 km	MPC · JPL
277231	2005 QE_{181}	—	August 30, 2005	Palomar	NEAT	·	1.1 km	MPC · JPL
277232	2005 QM_{181}	—	August 30, 2005	Kitt Peak	Spacewatch	·	1.4 km	MPC · JPL
277233	2005 QE_{182}	—	August 31, 2005	Palomar	NEAT	·	1.1 km	MPC · JPL
277234	2005 QM_{182}	—	August 29, 2005	Kitt Peak	Spacewatch	NYS	1.2 km	MPC · JPL
277235	2005 QR_{189}	—	August 29, 2005	Kitt Peak	Spacewatch	·	820 m	MPC · JPL
277236	2005 RS_{1}	—	September 1, 2005	Palomar	NEAT	·	2.8 km	MPC · JPL
277237	2005 RZ_{5}	—	September 6, 2005	Anderson Mesa	LONEOS	·	1.1 km	MPC · JPL
277238	2005 RD_{8}	—	September 8, 2005	Socorro	LINEAR	·	1.8 km	MPC · JPL
277239	2005 RT_{10}	—	September 8, 2005	Siding Spring	SSS	·	960 m	MPC · JPL
277240	2005 RL_{14}	—	September 1, 2005	Kitt Peak	Spacewatch	V	630 m	MPC · JPL
277241	2005 RT_{14}	—	September 1, 2005	Kitt Peak	Spacewatch	V	730 m	MPC · JPL
277242	2005 RF_{19}	—	September 1, 2005	Kitt Peak	Spacewatch	MAS	810 m	MPC · JPL
277243	2005 RN_{22}	—	September 10, 2005	Anderson Mesa	LONEOS	V	780 m	MPC · JPL
277244	2005 RZ_{23}	—	September 10, 2005	Anderson Mesa	LONEOS	·	2.2 km	MPC · JPL
277245	2005 RX_{24}	—	September 6, 2005	Catalina	CSS	·	1.9 km	MPC · JPL
277246	2005 RT_{25}	—	September 11, 2005	Anderson Mesa	LONEOS	·	1.3 km	MPC · JPL
277247	2005 RG_{30}	—	September 9, 2005	Socorro	LINEAR	·	1.3 km	MPC · JPL
277248	2005 RK_{30}	—	September 9, 2005	Socorro	LINEAR	·	3.4 km	MPC · JPL
277249	2005 RT_{30}	—	September 11, 2005	Anderson Mesa	LONEOS	·	2.0 km	MPC · JPL
277250	2005 RL_{41}	—	September 13, 2005	Kitt Peak	Spacewatch	·	1.1 km	MPC · JPL
277251	2005 RW_{44}	—	September 3, 2005	Catalina	CSS	T_{j} (2.97) · HIL · 3:2	7.6 km	MPC · JPL
277252	2005 RX_{44}	—	September 3, 2005	Catalina	CSS	·	1.5 km	MPC · JPL
277253	2005 RX_{45}	—	September 14, 2005	Apache Point	A. C. Becker	·	910 m	MPC · JPL
277254	2005 RC_{46}	—	September 14, 2005	Apache Point	A. C. Becker	·	1.3 km	MPC · JPL
277255	2005 SR_{2}	—	September 23, 2005	Catalina	CSS	·	1.4 km	MPC · JPL
277256	2005 SW_{2}	—	September 23, 2005	Catalina	CSS	V	840 m	MPC · JPL
277257	2005 SV_{3}	—	September 23, 2005	Kitt Peak	Spacewatch	·	2.8 km	MPC · JPL
277258	2005 SD_{5}	—	September 23, 2005	Anderson Mesa	LONEOS	·	980 m	MPC · JPL
277259	2005 SS_{9}	—	September 24, 2005	Kitt Peak	Spacewatch	·	1.0 km	MPC · JPL
277260	2005 SD_{17}	—	September 26, 2005	Kitt Peak	Spacewatch	·	790 m	MPC · JPL
277261	2005 SS_{20}	—	September 25, 2005	Kitt Peak	Spacewatch	V	820 m	MPC · JPL
277262	2005 SB_{26}	—	September 28, 2005	Ondřejov	P. Kušnirák	·	2.4 km	MPC · JPL
277263	2005 SO_{26}	—	September 23, 2005	Kitt Peak	Spacewatch	·	1.2 km	MPC · JPL
277264	2005 SE_{28}	—	September 23, 2005	Kitt Peak	Spacewatch	·	1.0 km	MPC · JPL
277265	2005 SW_{31}	—	September 23, 2005	Kitt Peak	Spacewatch	·	1.6 km	MPC · JPL
277266	2005 SB_{42}	—	September 24, 2005	Kitt Peak	Spacewatch	·	740 m	MPC · JPL
277267	2005 SU_{49}	—	September 24, 2005	Kitt Peak	Spacewatch	·	1.1 km	MPC · JPL
277268	2005 SR_{50}	—	September 24, 2005	Kitt Peak	Spacewatch	·	1.1 km	MPC · JPL
277269	2005 SC_{53}	—	September 25, 2005	Catalina	CSS	·	760 m	MPC · JPL
277270	2005 SB_{55}	—	September 25, 2005	Kitt Peak	Spacewatch	·	1.2 km	MPC · JPL
277271	2005 SL_{58}	—	September 26, 2005	Goodricke-Pigott	R. A. Tucker	(5)	1.3 km	MPC · JPL
277272	2005 SQ_{60}	—	September 26, 2005	Kitt Peak	Spacewatch	·	850 m	MPC · JPL
277273	2005 SU_{61}	—	September 26, 2005	Kitt Peak	Spacewatch	·	3.4 km	MPC · JPL
277274	2005 SD_{63}	—	September 26, 2005	Palomar	NEAT	·	1.6 km	MPC · JPL
277275	2005 SQ_{67}	—	September 27, 2005	Kitt Peak	Spacewatch	NYS	1.2 km	MPC · JPL
277276	2005 SR_{67}	—	September 27, 2005	Kitt Peak	Spacewatch	·	1.0 km	MPC · JPL
277277	2005 SK_{68}	—	September 27, 2005	Kitt Peak	Spacewatch	·	1.3 km	MPC · JPL
277278	2005 SV_{68}	—	September 27, 2005	Kitt Peak	Spacewatch	·	920 m	MPC · JPL
277279	2005 SA_{71}	—	September 30, 2005	Socorro	LINEAR	AMO	570 m	MPC · JPL
277280	2005 SA_{77}	—	September 24, 2005	Kitt Peak	Spacewatch	V	780 m	MPC · JPL
277281	2005 SQ_{77}	—	September 24, 2005	Kitt Peak	Spacewatch	V	830 m	MPC · JPL
277282	2005 SW_{77}	—	September 24, 2005	Kitt Peak	Spacewatch	·	1.2 km	MPC · JPL
277283	2005 SZ_{78}	—	September 24, 2005	Kitt Peak	Spacewatch	NYS	1.1 km	MPC · JPL
277284	2005 SD_{86}	—	September 24, 2005	Kitt Peak	Spacewatch	·	1.3 km	MPC · JPL
277285	2005 SG_{86}	—	September 24, 2005	Kitt Peak	Spacewatch	·	1.1 km	MPC · JPL
277286	2005 SK_{88}	—	September 24, 2005	Kitt Peak	Spacewatch	·	3.2 km	MPC · JPL
277287	2005 SN_{88}	—	September 24, 2005	Anderson Mesa	LONEOS	(2076)	1.3 km	MPC · JPL
277288	2005 SA_{89}	—	September 24, 2005	Kitt Peak	Spacewatch	ERI	1.6 km	MPC · JPL
277289	2005 SZ_{95}	—	September 25, 2005	Kitt Peak	Spacewatch	·	770 m	MPC · JPL
277290	2005 SN_{104}	—	September 25, 2005	Kitt Peak	Spacewatch	·	1.6 km	MPC · JPL
277291	2005 SH_{105}	—	September 25, 2005	Kitt Peak	Spacewatch	·	4.2 km	MPC · JPL
277292	2005 SD_{106}	—	September 25, 2005	Palomar	NEAT	·	1.8 km	MPC · JPL
277293	2005 SN_{106}	—	September 26, 2005	Kitt Peak	Spacewatch	MAS	820 m	MPC · JPL
277294	2005 SE_{107}	—	September 26, 2005	Catalina	CSS	PHO	3.8 km	MPC · JPL
277295	2005 SR_{123}	—	September 29, 2005	Anderson Mesa	LONEOS	V	950 m	MPC · JPL
277296	2005 SA_{125}	—	September 29, 2005	Palomar	NEAT	·	840 m	MPC · JPL
277297	2005 SY_{128}	—	September 29, 2005	Mount Lemmon	Mount Lemmon Survey	·	1.0 km	MPC · JPL
277298	2005 SO_{130}	—	September 29, 2005	Palomar	NEAT	V	930 m	MPC · JPL
277299	2005 SN_{133}	—	September 29, 2005	Kitt Peak	Spacewatch	(5)	1.3 km	MPC · JPL
277300	2005 SK_{139}	—	September 25, 2005	Kitt Peak	Spacewatch	·	1.5 km	MPC · JPL

== 277301–277400 ==
back to top

Designation			Discovery			Properties		Ref
Permanent	Provisional	Named after	Date	Site	Discoverer(s)	Category	Diam.	Ref
277301	2005 SZ_{140}	—	September 25, 2005	Kitt Peak	Spacewatch	·	1.6 km	MPC · JPL
277302	2005 SY_{143}	—	September 25, 2005	Kitt Peak	Spacewatch	V	800 m	MPC · JPL
277303	2005 SE_{144}	—	September 25, 2005	Kitt Peak	Spacewatch	·	1.3 km	MPC · JPL
277304	2005 SZ_{151}	—	September 25, 2005	Palomar	NEAT	·	1.4 km	MPC · JPL
277305	2005 SJ_{152}	—	September 25, 2005	Kitt Peak	Spacewatch	NYS	1.3 km	MPC · JPL
277306	2005 SO_{156}	—	September 26, 2005	Kitt Peak	Spacewatch	·	1.4 km	MPC · JPL
277307	2005 ST_{164}	—	September 27, 2005	Palomar	NEAT	·	1.7 km	MPC · JPL
277308	2005 SF_{169}	—	September 29, 2005	Kitt Peak	Spacewatch	·	1.3 km	MPC · JPL
277309	2005 SZ_{169}	—	September 29, 2005	Kitt Peak	Spacewatch	·	1.1 km	MPC · JPL
277310	2005 SQ_{175}	—	September 29, 2005	Kitt Peak	Spacewatch	·	860 m	MPC · JPL
277311	2005 SP_{186}	—	September 29, 2005	Mount Lemmon	Mount Lemmon Survey	·	980 m	MPC · JPL
277312	2005 ST_{192}	—	September 29, 2005	Mount Lemmon	Mount Lemmon Survey	·	920 m	MPC · JPL
277313	2005 SE_{205}	—	September 30, 2005	Anderson Mesa	LONEOS	·	890 m	MPC · JPL
277314	2005 SV_{207}	—	September 30, 2005	Socorro	LINEAR	V	1.0 km	MPC · JPL
277315	2005 SS_{209}	—	September 30, 2005	Palomar	NEAT	V	850 m	MPC · JPL
277316	2005 SV_{212}	—	September 30, 2005	Mount Lemmon	Mount Lemmon Survey	·	1.4 km	MPC · JPL
277317	2005 SD_{213}	—	September 30, 2005	Mount Lemmon	Mount Lemmon Survey	MAS	930 m	MPC · JPL
277318	2005 SR_{215}	—	September 30, 2005	Catalina	CSS	·	980 m	MPC · JPL
277319	2005 ST_{217}	—	September 30, 2005	Palomar	NEAT	·	1.5 km	MPC · JPL
277320	2005 SJ_{218}	—	September 30, 2005	Palomar	NEAT	·	1.4 km	MPC · JPL
277321	2005 SK_{218}	—	September 30, 2005	Palomar	NEAT	·	1.6 km	MPC · JPL
277322	2005 SH_{224}	—	September 29, 2005	Mount Lemmon	Mount Lemmon Survey	NYS	1.0 km	MPC · JPL
277323	2005 SA_{239}	—	September 30, 2005	Mount Lemmon	Mount Lemmon Survey	·	820 m	MPC · JPL
277324	2005 SS_{240}	—	September 30, 2005	Kitt Peak	Spacewatch	·	980 m	MPC · JPL
277325	2005 SV_{243}	—	September 30, 2005	Palomar	NEAT	V	880 m	MPC · JPL
277326	2005 SR_{249}	—	September 23, 2005	Anderson Mesa	LONEOS	·	1.1 km	MPC · JPL
277327	2005 SQ_{254}	—	September 22, 2005	Palomar	NEAT	3:2	7.1 km	MPC · JPL
277328	2005 SY_{259}	—	September 26, 2005	Kitt Peak	Spacewatch	·	1 km	MPC · JPL
277329	2005 SK_{279}	—	September 30, 2005	Mount Lemmon	Mount Lemmon Survey	V	900 m	MPC · JPL
277330	2005 SM_{290}	—	September 22, 2005	Palomar	NEAT	·	1.4 km	MPC · JPL
277331	2005 TN_{12}	—	October 1, 2005	Kitt Peak	Spacewatch	·	1.2 km	MPC · JPL
277332	2005 TQ_{12}	—	October 1, 2005	Kitt Peak	Spacewatch	·	1.2 km	MPC · JPL
277333	2005 TU_{18}	—	October 1, 2005	Socorro	LINEAR	·	1.4 km	MPC · JPL
277334	2005 TN_{26}	—	October 1, 2005	Mount Lemmon	Mount Lemmon Survey	·	1.5 km	MPC · JPL
277335	2005 TP_{27}	—	October 1, 2005	Catalina	CSS	NYS	1.2 km	MPC · JPL
277336	2005 TF_{28}	—	October 1, 2005	Anderson Mesa	LONEOS	V	1.0 km	MPC · JPL
277337	2005 TT_{32}	—	October 1, 2005	Kitt Peak	Spacewatch	·	1.0 km	MPC · JPL
277338	2005 TR_{42}	—	October 3, 2005	Palomar	NEAT	·	1.3 km	MPC · JPL
277339	2005 TM_{45}	—	October 6, 2005	Junk Bond	D. Healy	·	910 m	MPC · JPL
277340	2005 TS_{63}	—	October 6, 2005	Anderson Mesa	LONEOS	·	1.0 km	MPC · JPL
277341	2005 TO_{68}	—	October 6, 2005	Mount Lemmon	Mount Lemmon Survey	·	1.0 km	MPC · JPL
277342	2005 TL_{73}	—	October 6, 2005	Catalina	CSS	·	1.6 km	MPC · JPL
277343	2005 TQ_{73}	—	October 7, 2005	Anderson Mesa	LONEOS	·	1.0 km	MPC · JPL
277344	2005 TN_{75}	—	October 3, 2005	Catalina	CSS	·	1.1 km	MPC · JPL
277345	2005 TP_{78}	—	October 7, 2005	Anderson Mesa	LONEOS	JUN	1.4 km	MPC · JPL
277346	2005 TJ_{79}	—	October 8, 2005	Anderson Mesa	LONEOS	·	1.3 km	MPC · JPL
277347	2005 TS_{82}	—	October 3, 2005	Socorro	LINEAR	·	1.9 km	MPC · JPL
277348	2005 TU_{82}	—	October 3, 2005	Socorro	LINEAR	·	1.5 km	MPC · JPL
277349	2005 TY_{82}	—	October 3, 2005	Socorro	LINEAR	·	1.5 km	MPC · JPL
277350	2005 TN_{101}	—	October 7, 2005	Catalina	CSS	V	940 m	MPC · JPL
277351	2005 TS_{101}	—	October 7, 2005	Catalina	CSS	·	1.6 km	MPC · JPL
277352	2005 TD_{102}	—	October 7, 2005	Mount Lemmon	Mount Lemmon Survey	·	1.3 km	MPC · JPL
277353	2005 TE_{105}	—	October 8, 2005	Socorro	LINEAR	·	1.1 km	MPC · JPL
277354	2005 TK_{110}	—	October 7, 2005	Kitt Peak	Spacewatch	·	1.2 km	MPC · JPL
277355	2005 TB_{112}	—	October 7, 2005	Kitt Peak	Spacewatch	V	2.0 km	MPC · JPL
277356	2005 TG_{118}	—	October 7, 2005	Kitt Peak	Spacewatch	·	1.1 km	MPC · JPL
277357	2005 TQ_{121}	—	October 7, 2005	Catalina	CSS	NYS	1.1 km	MPC · JPL
277358	2005 TB_{129}	—	October 7, 2005	Kitt Peak	Spacewatch	·	1.2 km	MPC · JPL
277359	2005 TY_{139}	—	October 8, 2005	Kitt Peak	Spacewatch	CLA	2.0 km	MPC · JPL
277360	2005 TY_{147}	—	October 8, 2005	Kitt Peak	Spacewatch	·	1.1 km	MPC · JPL
277361	2005 TA_{164}	—	October 9, 2005	Kitt Peak	Spacewatch	·	1.4 km	MPC · JPL
277362	2005 TT_{166}	—	October 9, 2005	Kitt Peak	Spacewatch	·	1.2 km	MPC · JPL
277363	2005 TJ_{167}	—	October 9, 2005	Kitt Peak	Spacewatch	MAS	800 m	MPC · JPL
277364	2005 TZ_{167}	—	October 9, 2005	Kitt Peak	Spacewatch	·	2.5 km	MPC · JPL
277365	2005 TQ_{172}	—	October 12, 2005	Kitt Peak	Spacewatch	·	1.2 km	MPC · JPL
277366	2005 TQ_{175}	—	October 3, 2005	Catalina	CSS	·	950 m	MPC · JPL
277367	2005 TE_{193}	—	October 1, 2005	Mount Lemmon	Mount Lemmon Survey	V	630 m	MPC · JPL
277368	2005 TJ_{193}	—	October 2, 2005	Anderson Mesa	LONEOS	·	920 m	MPC · JPL
277369	2005 UZ	—	October 20, 2005	Junk Bond	D. Healy	KOR	2.0 km	MPC · JPL
277370	2005 US_{1}	—	October 22, 2005	Junk Bond	D. Healy	·	1.5 km	MPC · JPL
277371	2005 UJ_{9}	—	October 21, 2005	Palomar	NEAT	·	930 m	MPC · JPL
277372	2005 UR_{15}	—	October 22, 2005	Kitt Peak	Spacewatch	·	1.2 km	MPC · JPL
277373	2005 UD_{20}	—	October 22, 2005	Kitt Peak	Spacewatch	slow	4.2 km	MPC · JPL
277374	2005 US_{22}	—	October 23, 2005	Kitt Peak	Spacewatch	·	4.7 km	MPC · JPL
277375	2005 UY_{26}	—	October 23, 2005	Catalina	CSS	·	1.5 km	MPC · JPL
277376	2005 UT_{27}	—	October 23, 2005	Catalina	CSS	(2076)	1.2 km	MPC · JPL
277377	2005 UH_{29}	—	October 23, 2005	Catalina	CSS	·	1.5 km	MPC · JPL
277378	2005 UG_{34}	—	October 24, 2005	Kitt Peak	Spacewatch	·	1.2 km	MPC · JPL
277379	2005 UU_{40}	—	October 24, 2005	Kitt Peak	Spacewatch	NYS	1.5 km	MPC · JPL
277380	2005 UG_{64}	—	October 25, 2005	Catalina	CSS	VER	3.7 km	MPC · JPL
277381	2005 UR_{67}	—	October 22, 2005	Palomar	NEAT	·	1.3 km	MPC · JPL
277382	2005 UL_{70}	—	October 23, 2005	Catalina	CSS	·	1.5 km	MPC · JPL
277383	2005 UW_{79}	—	October 25, 2005	Kitt Peak	Spacewatch	·	1.8 km	MPC · JPL
277384	2005 UZ_{96}	—	October 22, 2005	Kitt Peak	Spacewatch	·	1.3 km	MPC · JPL
277385	2005 UO_{101}	—	October 22, 2005	Kitt Peak	Spacewatch	·	1.6 km	MPC · JPL
277386	2005 UL_{103}	—	October 22, 2005	Kitt Peak	Spacewatch	·	2.6 km	MPC · JPL
277387	2005 UP_{121}	—	October 24, 2005	Kitt Peak	Spacewatch	MAS	730 m	MPC · JPL
277388	2005 UG_{123}	—	October 24, 2005	Kitt Peak	Spacewatch	·	1.2 km	MPC · JPL
277389	2005 UX_{124}	—	October 24, 2005	Kitt Peak	Spacewatch	(5)	1.2 km	MPC · JPL
277390	2005 UM_{125}	—	October 24, 2005	Kitt Peak	Spacewatch	MAS	920 m	MPC · JPL
277391	2005 UU_{131}	—	October 24, 2005	Palomar	NEAT	·	1.5 km	MPC · JPL
277392	2005 UM_{141}	—	October 25, 2005	Catalina	CSS	HNS	1.6 km	MPC · JPL
277393	2005 UE_{146}	—	October 26, 2005	Kitt Peak	Spacewatch	·	1.0 km	MPC · JPL
277394	2005 UK_{151}	—	October 26, 2005	Kitt Peak	Spacewatch	HYG	4.0 km	MPC · JPL
277395	2005 UL_{151}	—	October 26, 2005	Kitt Peak	Spacewatch	·	1.4 km	MPC · JPL
277396	2005 UN_{152}	—	October 26, 2005	Kitt Peak	Spacewatch	·	1.7 km	MPC · JPL
277397	2005 UN_{156}	—	October 28, 2005	Junk Bond	D. Healy	·	1.2 km	MPC · JPL
277398	2005 UK_{162}	—	October 27, 2005	Anderson Mesa	LONEOS	·	1.3 km	MPC · JPL
277399	2005 UB_{164}	—	October 24, 2005	Kitt Peak	Spacewatch	·	1.7 km	MPC · JPL
277400	2005 UE_{164}	—	October 24, 2005	Kitt Peak	Spacewatch	·	1.1 km	MPC · JPL

== 277401–277500 ==
back to top

Designation			Discovery			Properties		Ref
Permanent	Provisional	Named after	Date	Site	Discoverer(s)	Category	Diam.	Ref
277401	2005 UV_{180}	—	October 24, 2005	Kitt Peak	Spacewatch	·	1.4 km	MPC · JPL
277402	2005 UR_{181}	—	October 24, 2005	Kitt Peak	Spacewatch	·	1.7 km	MPC · JPL
277403	2005 UF_{182}	—	October 24, 2005	Kitt Peak	Spacewatch	·	1.4 km	MPC · JPL
277404	2005 UE_{184}	—	October 25, 2005	Mount Lemmon	Mount Lemmon Survey	·	1.2 km	MPC · JPL
277405	2005 UL_{195}	—	October 22, 2005	Catalina	CSS	·	2.3 km	MPC · JPL
277406	2005 UJ_{204}	—	October 25, 2005	Mount Lemmon	Mount Lemmon Survey	·	2.1 km	MPC · JPL
277407	2005 UZ_{205}	—	October 26, 2005	Kitt Peak	Spacewatch	·	1.4 km	MPC · JPL
277408	2005 UH_{212}	—	October 27, 2005	Kitt Peak	Spacewatch	·	1.3 km	MPC · JPL
277409	2005 UR_{217}	—	October 22, 2005	Kitt Peak	Spacewatch	·	1.0 km	MPC · JPL
277410	2005 UM_{222}	—	October 25, 2005	Kitt Peak	Spacewatch	·	1.1 km	MPC · JPL
277411	2005 UR_{229}	—	October 25, 2005	Kitt Peak	Spacewatch	·	1.1 km	MPC · JPL
277412	2005 UB_{230}	—	October 25, 2005	Kitt Peak	Spacewatch	·	3.2 km	MPC · JPL
277413	2005 UP_{230}	—	October 25, 2005	Catalina	CSS	·	1.4 km	MPC · JPL
277414	2005 UD_{231}	—	October 25, 2005	Mount Lemmon	Mount Lemmon Survey	·	1 km	MPC · JPL
277415	2005 UY_{231}	—	October 25, 2005	Mount Lemmon	Mount Lemmon Survey	V	860 m	MPC · JPL
277416	2005 UP_{233}	—	October 25, 2005	Kitt Peak	Spacewatch	·	800 m	MPC · JPL
277417	2005 UL_{253}	—	October 27, 2005	Mount Lemmon	Mount Lemmon Survey	·	1.1 km	MPC · JPL
277418	2005 UU_{256}	—	October 25, 2005	Mount Lemmon	Mount Lemmon Survey	MAS	760 m	MPC · JPL
277419	2005 US_{259}	—	October 25, 2005	Kitt Peak	Spacewatch	·	1.1 km	MPC · JPL
277420	2005 UG_{275}	—	October 28, 2005	Socorro	LINEAR	NYS	1.5 km	MPC · JPL
277421	2005 UX_{288}	—	October 26, 2005	Kitt Peak	Spacewatch	·	1.7 km	MPC · JPL
277422	2005 UT_{313}	—	October 27, 2005	Socorro	LINEAR	·	1.1 km	MPC · JPL
277423	2005 UC_{314}	—	October 27, 2005	Catalina	CSS	·	1.0 km	MPC · JPL
277424	2005 UO_{335}	—	October 30, 2005	Palomar	NEAT	·	1.8 km	MPC · JPL
277425	2005 UC_{354}	—	October 29, 2005	Kitt Peak	Spacewatch	PHO	1.4 km	MPC · JPL
277426	2005 UF_{361}	—	October 27, 2005	Kitt Peak	Spacewatch	·	830 m	MPC · JPL
277427	2005 UR_{363}	—	October 27, 2005	Kitt Peak	Spacewatch	NYS	770 m	MPC · JPL
277428	2005 UL_{364}	—	October 27, 2005	Kitt Peak	Spacewatch	·	1.0 km	MPC · JPL
277429	2005 UU_{365}	—	October 27, 2005	Kitt Peak	Spacewatch	·	950 m	MPC · JPL
277430	2005 UZ_{368}	—	October 27, 2005	Kitt Peak	Spacewatch	·	3.2 km	MPC · JPL
277431	2005 UF_{380}	—	October 29, 2005	Mount Lemmon	Mount Lemmon Survey	·	1.4 km	MPC · JPL
277432	2005 UF_{381}	—	October 30, 2005	Mount Lemmon	Mount Lemmon Survey	·	800 m	MPC · JPL
277433	2005 US_{382}	—	October 27, 2005	Socorro	LINEAR	·	970 m	MPC · JPL
277434	2005 UQ_{387}	—	October 30, 2005	Mount Lemmon	Mount Lemmon Survey	CLA	2.0 km	MPC · JPL
277435	2005 UB_{388}	—	October 26, 2005	Kitt Peak	Spacewatch	NYS	1.5 km	MPC · JPL
277436	2005 UB_{427}	—	October 28, 2005	Mount Lemmon	Mount Lemmon Survey	MAS	960 m	MPC · JPL
277437	2005 UG_{433}	—	October 28, 2005	Kitt Peak	Spacewatch	THM	3.2 km	MPC · JPL
277438	2005 UH_{433}	—	October 28, 2005	Kitt Peak	Spacewatch	NYS	1.2 km	MPC · JPL
277439	2005 UR_{440}	—	October 29, 2005	Catalina	CSS	·	1.2 km	MPC · JPL
277440	2005 UU_{441}	—	October 29, 2005	Mount Lemmon	Mount Lemmon Survey	V	830 m	MPC · JPL
277441	2005 UN_{443}	—	October 30, 2005	Socorro	LINEAR	·	2.1 km	MPC · JPL
277442	2005 US_{454}	—	October 28, 2005	Catalina	CSS	V	770 m	MPC · JPL
277443	2005 UF_{456}	—	October 29, 2005	Catalina	CSS	BRG	1.8 km	MPC · JPL
277444	2005 UF_{460}	—	October 28, 2005	Mount Lemmon	Mount Lemmon Survey	·	1.3 km	MPC · JPL
277445	2005 UD_{464}	—	October 30, 2005	Kitt Peak	Spacewatch	·	1.5 km	MPC · JPL
277446	2005 UV_{476}	—	October 25, 2005	Kitt Peak	Spacewatch	·	1.4 km	MPC · JPL
277447	2005 UY_{480}	—	October 25, 2005	Socorro	LINEAR	PHO	1.0 km	MPC · JPL
277448	2005 UQ_{486}	—	October 23, 2005	Catalina	CSS	EUN	1.5 km	MPC · JPL
277449	2005 UM_{492}	—	October 25, 2005	Anderson Mesa	LONEOS	·	1.5 km	MPC · JPL
277450	2005 UH_{497}	—	October 27, 2005	Socorro	LINEAR	·	900 m	MPC · JPL
277451	2005 UT_{504}	—	October 24, 2005	Mauna Kea	D. J. Tholen	·	3.0 km	MPC · JPL
277452	2005 UW_{508}	—	October 25, 2005	Catalina	CSS	·	4.5 km	MPC · JPL
277453	2005 UY_{508}	—	October 25, 2005	Mount Lemmon	Mount Lemmon Survey	·	1.5 km	MPC · JPL
277454	2005 UT_{509}	—	October 22, 2005	Kitt Peak	Spacewatch	(5)	1.6 km	MPC · JPL
277455	2005 UK_{512}	—	October 30, 2005	Kitt Peak	Spacewatch	·	1.1 km	MPC · JPL
277456	2005 UQ_{512}	—	October 30, 2005	Mount Lemmon	Mount Lemmon Survey	·	1.8 km	MPC · JPL
277457	2005 UC_{515}	—	October 22, 2005	Apache Point	A. C. Becker	·	3.3 km	MPC · JPL
277458	2005 UK_{518}	—	October 25, 2005	Apache Point	A. C. Becker	EOS	2.1 km	MPC · JPL
277459	2005 UU_{524}	—	October 30, 2005	Kitt Peak	Spacewatch	·	1.4 km	MPC · JPL
277460	2005 UZ_{526}	—	October 25, 2005	Mount Lemmon	Mount Lemmon Survey	·	1.6 km	MPC · JPL
277461	2005 VR_{6}	—	November 6, 2005	Kitt Peak	Spacewatch	·	1.7 km	MPC · JPL
277462	2005 VR_{13}	—	November 3, 2005	Catalina	CSS	·	1.1 km	MPC · JPL
277463	2005 VV_{17}	—	November 4, 2005	Mount Lemmon	Mount Lemmon Survey	(5)	1.3 km	MPC · JPL
277464	2005 VO_{33}	—	November 2, 2005	Mount Lemmon	Mount Lemmon Survey	·	2.7 km	MPC · JPL
277465	2005 VO_{38}	—	November 3, 2005	Mount Lemmon	Mount Lemmon Survey	·	1.5 km	MPC · JPL
277466	2005 VQ_{50}	—	November 3, 2005	Catalina	CSS	·	1.6 km	MPC · JPL
277467	2005 VV_{55}	—	November 4, 2005	Mount Lemmon	Mount Lemmon Survey	·	980 m	MPC · JPL
277468	2005 VQ_{61}	—	November 5, 2005	Kitt Peak	Spacewatch	·	3.0 km	MPC · JPL
277469	2005 VT_{87}	—	November 6, 2005	Kitt Peak	Spacewatch	·	4.9 km	MPC · JPL
277470	2005 VO_{89}	—	November 6, 2005	Kitt Peak	Spacewatch	·	1.1 km	MPC · JPL
277471	2005 VP_{99}	—	November 1, 2005	Kitt Peak	Spacewatch	·	3.2 km	MPC · JPL
277472	2005 VN_{124}	—	November 12, 2005	Kitt Peak	Spacewatch	·	1.0 km	MPC · JPL
277473	2005 WD_{1}	—	November 21, 2005	Socorro	LINEAR	AMO +1km	1.5 km	MPC · JPL
277474	2005 WE_{3}	—	November 20, 2005	Anderson Mesa	LONEOS	·	1.7 km	MPC · JPL
277475	2005 WK_{4}	—	November 27, 2005	Siding Spring	SSS	APO · PHA	320 m	MPC · JPL
277476	2005 WF_{6}	—	November 21, 2005	Catalina	CSS	·	2.8 km	MPC · JPL
277477	2005 WJ_{12}	—	November 22, 2005	Kitt Peak	Spacewatch	·	1.5 km	MPC · JPL
277478	2005 WM_{15}	—	November 22, 2005	Kitt Peak	Spacewatch	·	1.2 km	MPC · JPL
277479	2005 WQ_{32}	—	November 21, 2005	Kitt Peak	Spacewatch	MAS	750 m	MPC · JPL
277480	2005 WC_{33}	—	November 21, 2005	Catalina	CSS	·	4.0 km	MPC · JPL
277481	2005 WQ_{36}	—	November 22, 2005	Kitt Peak	Spacewatch	·	1.9 km	MPC · JPL
277482	2005 WR_{37}	—	November 22, 2005	Kitt Peak	Spacewatch	·	1.4 km	MPC · JPL
277483	2005 WC_{48}	—	November 25, 2005	Kitt Peak	Spacewatch	·	1.4 km	MPC · JPL
277484	2005 WO_{51}	—	November 25, 2005	Kitt Peak	Spacewatch	·	1.1 km	MPC · JPL
277485	2005 WB_{57}	—	November 20, 2005	Anderson Mesa	LONEOS	·	1.7 km	MPC · JPL
277486	2005 WV_{61}	—	November 25, 2005	Kitt Peak	Spacewatch	·	1.4 km	MPC · JPL
277487	2005 WM_{73}	—	November 25, 2005	Kitt Peak	Spacewatch	TIR	4.0 km	MPC · JPL
277488	2005 WK_{74}	—	November 27, 2005	Anderson Mesa	LONEOS	EUN	1.4 km	MPC · JPL
277489	2005 WR_{79}	—	November 25, 2005	Kitt Peak	Spacewatch	·	1.4 km	MPC · JPL
277490	2005 WQ_{81}	—	November 28, 2005	Socorro	LINEAR	·	1.8 km	MPC · JPL
277491	2005 WU_{84}	—	November 26, 2005	Mount Lemmon	Mount Lemmon Survey	MAR	1.6 km	MPC · JPL
277492	2005 WB_{87}	—	November 28, 2005	Mount Lemmon	Mount Lemmon Survey	·	2.9 km	MPC · JPL
277493	2005 WH_{94}	—	November 26, 2005	Kitt Peak	Spacewatch	·	1.1 km	MPC · JPL
277494	2005 WK_{105}	—	November 29, 2005	Catalina	CSS	·	1.9 km	MPC · JPL
277495	2005 WC_{110}	—	November 30, 2005	Kitt Peak	Spacewatch	·	1.6 km	MPC · JPL
277496	2005 WD_{118}	—	November 28, 2005	Catalina	CSS	·	1.1 km	MPC · JPL
277497	2005 WM_{118}	—	November 28, 2005	Catalina	CSS	·	1.8 km	MPC · JPL
277498	2005 WT_{119}	—	November 29, 2005	Kitt Peak	Spacewatch	(5)	1.3 km	MPC · JPL
277499	2005 WU_{121}	—	November 30, 2005	Mount Lemmon	Mount Lemmon Survey	·	1.4 km	MPC · JPL
277500	2005 WP_{133}	—	November 25, 2005	Mount Lemmon	Mount Lemmon Survey	·	1.6 km	MPC · JPL

== 277501–277600 ==
back to top

Designation			Discovery			Properties		Ref
Permanent	Provisional	Named after	Date	Site	Discoverer(s)	Category	Diam.	Ref
277501	2005 WE_{134}	—	November 25, 2005	Mount Lemmon	Mount Lemmon Survey	·	1.4 km	MPC · JPL
277502	2005 WZ_{134}	—	November 25, 2005	Mount Lemmon	Mount Lemmon Survey	·	3.2 km	MPC · JPL
277503	2005 WP_{147}	—	April 25, 2003	Kitt Peak	Spacewatch	EUN	1.4 km	MPC · JPL
277504	2005 WK_{151}	—	November 28, 2005	Kitt Peak	Spacewatch	·	1.7 km	MPC · JPL
277505	2005 WG_{158}	—	November 26, 2005	Mount Lemmon	Mount Lemmon Survey	PHO	1.8 km	MPC · JPL
277506	2005 WP_{163}	—	November 29, 2005	Kitt Peak	Spacewatch	fast	4.5 km	MPC · JPL
277507	2005 WQ_{164}	—	November 29, 2005	Mount Lemmon	Mount Lemmon Survey	·	1.0 km	MPC · JPL
277508	2005 WN_{172}	—	November 30, 2005	Mount Lemmon	Mount Lemmon Survey	·	1.0 km	MPC · JPL
277509	2005 WL_{176}	—	November 30, 2005	Kitt Peak	Spacewatch	·	1.2 km	MPC · JPL
277510	2005 WU_{177}	—	November 30, 2005	Kitt Peak	Spacewatch	·	2.6 km	MPC · JPL
277511	2005 WW_{178}	—	November 25, 2005	Catalina	CSS	GEF	1.9 km	MPC · JPL
277512	2005 WQ_{179}	—	November 21, 2005	Catalina	CSS	·	2.2 km	MPC · JPL
277513	2005 WT_{184}	—	November 29, 2005	Palomar	NEAT	·	1.7 km	MPC · JPL
277514	2005 WP_{185}	—	November 30, 2005	Socorro	LINEAR	·	3.8 km	MPC · JPL
277515	2005 WB_{189}	—	November 30, 2005	Socorro	LINEAR	HNS	2.2 km	MPC · JPL
277516	2005 WW_{193}	—	November 28, 2005	Socorro	LINEAR	·	2.2 km	MPC · JPL
277517	2005 WC_{203}	—	November 30, 2005	Kitt Peak	Spacewatch	PHO	1.4 km	MPC · JPL
277518	2005 WD_{208}	—	November 25, 2005	Kitt Peak	Spacewatch	·	1.1 km	MPC · JPL
277519	2005 WA_{209}	—	November 25, 2005	Kitt Peak	Spacewatch	·	1.3 km	MPC · JPL
277520	2005 WE_{209}	—	November 29, 2005	Kitt Peak	Spacewatch	(6769)	1.4 km	MPC · JPL
277521	2005 XB_{13}	—	December 1, 2005	Kitt Peak	Spacewatch	AGN	1.7 km	MPC · JPL
277522	2005 XD_{18}	—	December 1, 2005	Kitt Peak	Spacewatch	NYS	1.5 km	MPC · JPL
277523	2005 XW_{19}	—	December 2, 2005	Kitt Peak	Spacewatch	·	1.1 km	MPC · JPL
277524	2005 XY_{21}	—	December 2, 2005	Socorro	LINEAR	HYG	3.8 km	MPC · JPL
277525	2005 XS_{37}	—	December 4, 2005	Kitt Peak	Spacewatch	MAS	850 m	MPC · JPL
277526	2005 XU_{47}	—	December 2, 2005	Kitt Peak	Spacewatch	AGN	1.2 km	MPC · JPL
277527	2005 XF_{52}	—	December 2, 2005	Kitt Peak	Spacewatch	JUN	1.1 km	MPC · JPL
277528	2005 XG_{58}	—	December 2, 2005	Mount Lemmon	Mount Lemmon Survey	PHO	1.2 km	MPC · JPL
277529	2005 XL_{66}	—	December 8, 2005	Socorro	LINEAR	·	1.2 km	MPC · JPL
277530	2005 XM_{66}	—	December 8, 2005	Socorro	LINEAR	·	1.4 km	MPC · JPL
277531	2005 XB_{75}	—	December 6, 2005	Kitt Peak	Spacewatch	·	1.8 km	MPC · JPL
277532	2005 XX_{117}	—	December 6, 2005	Kitt Peak	Spacewatch	·	2.7 km	MPC · JPL
277533	2005 YZ_{3}	—	December 22, 2005	Pla D'Arguines	R. Ferrando	·	1.5 km	MPC · JPL
277534	2005 YB_{6}	—	December 21, 2005	Kitt Peak	Spacewatch	(5)	1.1 km	MPC · JPL
277535	2005 YD_{16}	—	December 22, 2005	Kitt Peak	Spacewatch	(11882)	1.5 km	MPC · JPL
277536	2005 YP_{23}	—	December 24, 2005	Kitt Peak	Spacewatch	AST	2.9 km	MPC · JPL
277537	2005 YP_{30}	—	December 22, 2005	Catalina	CSS	·	2.8 km	MPC · JPL
277538	2005 YB_{32}	—	December 22, 2005	Kitt Peak	Spacewatch	·	2.4 km	MPC · JPL
277539	2005 YE_{34}	—	December 24, 2005	Kitt Peak	Spacewatch	·	2.3 km	MPC · JPL
277540	2005 YZ_{46}	—	December 25, 2005	Kitt Peak	Spacewatch	·	2.9 km	MPC · JPL
277541	2005 YK_{56}	—	December 22, 2005	Catalina	CSS	·	1.6 km	MPC · JPL
277542	2005 YG_{72}	—	December 24, 2005	Kitt Peak	Spacewatch	·	1.8 km	MPC · JPL
277543	2005 YA_{74}	—	December 24, 2005	Kitt Peak	Spacewatch	·	1.8 km	MPC · JPL
277544	2005 YG_{76}	—	December 24, 2005	Kitt Peak	Spacewatch	·	1.2 km	MPC · JPL
277545	2005 YL_{82}	—	December 24, 2005	Kitt Peak	Spacewatch	·	2.0 km	MPC · JPL
277546	2005 YN_{85}	—	December 25, 2005	Mount Lemmon	Mount Lemmon Survey	·	1.3 km	MPC · JPL
277547	2005 YL_{86}	—	December 25, 2005	Mount Lemmon	Mount Lemmon Survey	·	1.8 km	MPC · JPL
277548	2005 YH_{92}	—	December 27, 2005	Mount Lemmon	Mount Lemmon Survey	·	1.3 km	MPC · JPL
277549	2005 YX_{103}	—	December 25, 2005	Kitt Peak	Spacewatch	AST	1.9 km	MPC · JPL
277550	2005 YE_{104}	—	December 25, 2005	Kitt Peak	Spacewatch	·	2.0 km	MPC · JPL
277551	2005 YV_{106}	—	December 25, 2005	Mount Lemmon	Mount Lemmon Survey	MIS	2.7 km	MPC · JPL
277552	2005 YK_{107}	—	December 25, 2005	Mount Lemmon	Mount Lemmon Survey	AST	1.8 km	MPC · JPL
277553	2005 YY_{108}	—	December 25, 2005	Kitt Peak	Spacewatch	·	1.4 km	MPC · JPL
277554	2005 YG_{109}	—	December 25, 2005	Kitt Peak	Spacewatch	·	2.0 km	MPC · JPL
277555	2005 YD_{115}	—	December 25, 2005	Kitt Peak	Spacewatch	·	2.0 km	MPC · JPL
277556	2005 YF_{115}	—	December 25, 2005	Kitt Peak	Spacewatch	·	1.6 km	MPC · JPL
277557	2005 YP_{124}	—	December 26, 2005	Kitt Peak	Spacewatch	·	3.5 km	MPC · JPL
277558	2005 YY_{125}	—	December 26, 2005	Kitt Peak	Spacewatch	·	2.5 km	MPC · JPL
277559	2005 YA_{126}	—	December 26, 2005	Kitt Peak	Spacewatch	·	1.2 km	MPC · JPL
277560	2005 YT_{126}	—	December 26, 2005	Kitt Peak	Spacewatch	·	1.7 km	MPC · JPL
277561	2005 YX_{127}	—	December 28, 2005	Kitt Peak	Spacewatch	(5)	1.4 km	MPC · JPL
277562	2005 YX_{132}	—	December 26, 2005	Kitt Peak	Spacewatch	·	1.7 km	MPC · JPL
277563	2005 YK_{134}	—	December 26, 2005	Kitt Peak	Spacewatch	·	1.7 km	MPC · JPL
277564	2005 YL_{140}	—	December 28, 2005	Mount Lemmon	Mount Lemmon Survey	AGN	1.5 km	MPC · JPL
277565	2005 YT_{146}	—	December 29, 2005	Mount Lemmon	Mount Lemmon Survey	MRX	1.1 km	MPC · JPL
277566	2005 YZ_{153}	—	December 29, 2005	Mount Lemmon	Mount Lemmon Survey	·	1.3 km	MPC · JPL
277567	2005 YF_{172}	—	December 22, 2005	Catalina	CSS	·	2.1 km	MPC · JPL
277568	2005 YR_{172}	—	December 23, 2005	Socorro	LINEAR	·	1.7 km	MPC · JPL
277569	2005 YW_{175}	—	December 22, 2005	Kitt Peak	Spacewatch	·	2.4 km	MPC · JPL
277570	2005 YP_{180}	—	December 30, 2005	Catalina	CSS	APO · PHA	440 m	MPC · JPL
277571	2005 YQ_{184}	—	December 27, 2005	Mount Lemmon	Mount Lemmon Survey	·	1.7 km	MPC · JPL
277572	2005 YR_{186}	—	December 28, 2005	Catalina	CSS	·	710 m	MPC · JPL
277573	2005 YG_{191}	—	December 30, 2005	Kitt Peak	Spacewatch	·	2.0 km	MPC · JPL
277574	2005 YR_{192}	—	December 30, 2005	Kitt Peak	Spacewatch	·	1.5 km	MPC · JPL
277575	2005 YH_{200}	—	December 26, 2005	Kitt Peak	Spacewatch	·	1.9 km	MPC · JPL
277576	2005 YA_{202}	—	December 24, 2005	Kitt Peak	Spacewatch	·	2.0 km	MPC · JPL
277577	2005 YQ_{203}	—	December 25, 2005	Mount Lemmon	Mount Lemmon Survey	AGN	1.2 km	MPC · JPL
277578	2005 YB_{212}	—	December 28, 2005	Catalina	CSS	·	2.6 km	MPC · JPL
277579	2005 YE_{214}	—	December 30, 2005	Catalina	CSS	EUN ·	3.4 km	MPC · JPL
277580	2005 YQ_{216}	—	December 29, 2005	Mount Lemmon	Mount Lemmon Survey	·	1.6 km	MPC · JPL
277581	2005 YK_{236}	—	December 28, 2005	Mount Lemmon	Mount Lemmon Survey	MRX	1.1 km	MPC · JPL
277582	2005 YS_{237}	—	December 28, 2005	Kitt Peak	Spacewatch	·	1.7 km	MPC · JPL
277583	2005 YZ_{268}	—	December 25, 2005	Mount Lemmon	Mount Lemmon Survey	·	4.0 km	MPC · JPL
277584	2005 YM_{279}	—	December 25, 2005	Mount Lemmon	Mount Lemmon Survey	·	3.0 km	MPC · JPL
277585	2005 YN_{281}	—	December 25, 2005	Kitt Peak	Spacewatch	NYS	1.4 km	MPC · JPL
277586	2006 AC_{7}	—	January 5, 2006	Catalina	CSS	·	2.4 km	MPC · JPL
277587	2006 AV_{7}	—	January 6, 2006	Socorro	LINEAR	·	1.8 km	MPC · JPL
277588	2006 AV_{8}	—	January 2, 2006	Mount Lemmon	Mount Lemmon Survey	·	1.7 km	MPC · JPL
277589	2006 AX_{9}	—	January 4, 2006	Mount Lemmon	Mount Lemmon Survey	·	2.1 km	MPC · JPL
277590	2006 AS_{10}	—	January 4, 2006	Catalina	CSS	·	2.3 km	MPC · JPL
277591	2006 AO_{12}	—	November 30, 2005	Mount Lemmon	Mount Lemmon Survey	·	2.1 km	MPC · JPL
277592	2006 AT_{12}	—	January 5, 2006	Socorro	LINEAR	·	3.1 km	MPC · JPL
277593	2006 AM_{17}	—	January 5, 2006	Kitt Peak	Spacewatch	·	1.5 km	MPC · JPL
277594	2006 AZ_{20}	—	January 5, 2006	Catalina	CSS	·	1.7 km	MPC · JPL
277595	2006 AQ_{21}	—	January 5, 2006	Catalina	CSS	MAR	1.4 km	MPC · JPL
277596	2006 AF_{27}	—	January 5, 2006	Mount Lemmon	Mount Lemmon Survey	·	1.4 km	MPC · JPL
277597	2006 AL_{34}	—	January 6, 2006	Catalina	CSS	EUN	2.2 km	MPC · JPL
277598	2006 AS_{34}	—	January 4, 2006	Kitt Peak	Spacewatch	·	1.6 km	MPC · JPL
277599	2006 AZ_{36}	—	January 4, 2006	Kitt Peak	Spacewatch	·	1.8 km	MPC · JPL
277600	2006 AG_{39}	—	January 7, 2006	Mount Lemmon	Mount Lemmon Survey	·	2.4 km	MPC · JPL

== 277601–277700 ==
back to top

Designation			Discovery			Properties		Ref
Permanent	Provisional	Named after	Date	Site	Discoverer(s)	Category	Diam.	Ref
277601	2006 AA_{46}	—	January 5, 2006	Kitt Peak	Spacewatch	·	2.4 km	MPC · JPL
277602	2006 AN_{48}	—	January 8, 2006	Mount Lemmon	Mount Lemmon Survey	·	1.9 km	MPC · JPL
277603	2006 AF_{63}	—	January 6, 2006	Kitt Peak	Spacewatch	·	2.1 km	MPC · JPL
277604	2006 AD_{66}	—	January 8, 2006	Mount Lemmon	Mount Lemmon Survey	·	2.3 km	MPC · JPL
277605	2006 AN_{67}	—	January 9, 2006	Kitt Peak	Spacewatch	·	1.7 km	MPC · JPL
277606	2006 AE_{68}	—	January 5, 2006	Mount Lemmon	Mount Lemmon Survey	·	1.8 km	MPC · JPL
277607	2006 AJ_{68}	—	January 5, 2006	Mount Lemmon	Mount Lemmon Survey	MAR	1.6 km	MPC · JPL
277608	2006 AD_{74}	—	January 4, 2006	Catalina	CSS	·	2.2 km	MPC · JPL
277609	2006 AS_{76}	—	January 5, 2006	Mount Lemmon	Mount Lemmon Survey	MAR	1.6 km	MPC · JPL
277610	2006 AZ_{81}	—	January 6, 2006	Kitt Peak	Spacewatch	·	1.9 km	MPC · JPL
277611	2006 AK_{85}	—	January 7, 2006	Socorro	LINEAR	·	2.0 km	MPC · JPL
277612	2006 AO_{100}	—	January 10, 2006	Mount Lemmon	Mount Lemmon Survey	·	2.1 km	MPC · JPL
277613	2006 AC_{101}	—	January 5, 2006	Mount Lemmon	Mount Lemmon Survey	·	2.3 km	MPC · JPL
277614	2006 BY_{1}	—	January 20, 2006	Kitt Peak	Spacewatch	·	1.8 km	MPC · JPL
277615	2006 BM_{2}	—	January 20, 2006	Catalina	CSS	ADE ·	2.9 km	MPC · JPL
277616	2006 BN_{6}	—	January 21, 2006	Siding Spring	SSS	T_{j} (2.98) · APO +1km	1.2 km	MPC · JPL
277617	2006 BT_{7}	—	January 22, 2006	Mount Lemmon	Mount Lemmon Survey	APO +1km	670 m	MPC · JPL
277618	2006 BT_{8}	—	January 23, 2006	Piszkéstető	K. Sárneczky	·	2.2 km	MPC · JPL
277619	2006 BS_{9}	—	January 22, 2006	Anderson Mesa	LONEOS	·	2.0 km	MPC · JPL
277620	2006 BL_{11}	—	January 20, 2006	Kitt Peak	Spacewatch	·	4.3 km	MPC · JPL
277621	2006 BZ_{23}	—	January 23, 2006	Catalina	CSS	·	3.4 km	MPC · JPL
277622	2006 BE_{24}	—	January 23, 2006	Mount Lemmon	Mount Lemmon Survey	·	3.2 km	MPC · JPL
277623	2006 BW_{30}	—	January 20, 2006	Kitt Peak	Spacewatch	·	2.4 km	MPC · JPL
277624	2006 BY_{30}	—	January 20, 2006	Kitt Peak	Spacewatch	·	3.0 km	MPC · JPL
277625	2006 BX_{33}	—	January 21, 2006	Kitt Peak	Spacewatch	·	2.3 km	MPC · JPL
277626	2006 BZ_{37}	—	January 23, 2006	Kitt Peak	Spacewatch	·	1.9 km	MPC · JPL
277627	2006 BF_{40}	—	January 20, 2006	Kitt Peak	Spacewatch	·	2.2 km	MPC · JPL
277628	2006 BU_{40}	—	January 21, 2006	Mount Lemmon	Mount Lemmon Survey	·	2.0 km	MPC · JPL
277629	2006 BZ_{42}	—	January 23, 2006	Kitt Peak	Spacewatch	·	1.9 km	MPC · JPL
277630	2006 BA_{56}	—	January 23, 2006	Mount Lemmon	Mount Lemmon Survey	·	1.9 km	MPC · JPL
277631	2006 BU_{63}	—	January 22, 2006	Mount Lemmon	Mount Lemmon Survey	·	1.3 km	MPC · JPL
277632	2006 BQ_{69}	—	January 23, 2006	Kitt Peak	Spacewatch	·	2.0 km	MPC · JPL
277633	2006 BG_{72}	—	January 23, 2006	Kitt Peak	Spacewatch	·	2.4 km	MPC · JPL
277634	2006 BN_{76}	—	January 23, 2006	Kitt Peak	Spacewatch	KOR	1.1 km	MPC · JPL
277635	2006 BH_{82}	—	January 23, 2006	Kitt Peak	Spacewatch	·	2.6 km	MPC · JPL
277636	2006 BK_{89}	—	January 25, 2006	Kitt Peak	Spacewatch	·	1.8 km	MPC · JPL
277637	2006 BV_{95}	—	January 26, 2006	Kitt Peak	Spacewatch	·	1.9 km	MPC · JPL
277638	2006 BD_{101}	—	January 23, 2006	Catalina	CSS	EUN	1.7 km	MPC · JPL
277639	2006 BU_{103}	—	January 23, 2006	Mount Lemmon	Mount Lemmon Survey	WIT	1.5 km	MPC · JPL
277640	2006 BW_{108}	—	January 25, 2006	Kitt Peak	Spacewatch	·	1.4 km	MPC · JPL
277641	2006 BR_{109}	—	January 25, 2006	Kitt Peak	Spacewatch	EOS	2.6 km	MPC · JPL
277642	2006 BU_{109}	—	January 25, 2006	Kitt Peak	Spacewatch	·	1.4 km	MPC · JPL
277643	2006 BO_{112}	—	January 25, 2006	Kitt Peak	Spacewatch	·	2.0 km	MPC · JPL
277644	2006 BQ_{112}	—	January 25, 2006	Kitt Peak	Spacewatch	(17392)	1.8 km	MPC · JPL
277645	2006 BW_{112}	—	January 25, 2006	Kitt Peak	Spacewatch	·	1.7 km	MPC · JPL
277646	2006 BA_{118}	—	January 26, 2006	Mount Lemmon	Mount Lemmon Survey	(5)	1.5 km	MPC · JPL
277647	2006 BM_{118}	—	January 26, 2006	Kitt Peak	Spacewatch	EOS	2.1 km	MPC · JPL
277648	2006 BP_{123}	—	January 26, 2006	Kitt Peak	Spacewatch	·	1.9 km	MPC · JPL
277649	2006 BT_{128}	—	January 26, 2006	Mount Lemmon	Mount Lemmon Survey	·	1.6 km	MPC · JPL
277650	2006 BJ_{130}	—	January 26, 2006	Kitt Peak	Spacewatch	AEO	1.3 km	MPC · JPL
277651	2006 BW_{130}	—	January 26, 2006	Mount Lemmon	Mount Lemmon Survey	·	2.5 km	MPC · JPL
277652	2006 BX_{131}	—	January 26, 2006	Kitt Peak	Spacewatch	·	2.2 km	MPC · JPL
277653	2006 BQ_{135}	—	January 27, 2006	Mount Lemmon	Mount Lemmon Survey	·	3.3 km	MPC · JPL
277654	2006 BB_{140}	—	January 21, 2006	Kitt Peak	Spacewatch	ADE	3.7 km	MPC · JPL
277655	2006 BP_{141}	—	January 25, 2006	Kitt Peak	Spacewatch	·	2.6 km	MPC · JPL
277656	2006 BV_{141}	—	January 25, 2006	Kitt Peak	Spacewatch	AST	2.7 km	MPC · JPL
277657	2006 BM_{150}	—	January 24, 2006	Anderson Mesa	LONEOS	·	1.6 km	MPC · JPL
277658	2006 BD_{165}	—	January 26, 2006	Kitt Peak	Spacewatch	LEO	3.0 km	MPC · JPL
277659	2006 BP_{169}	—	January 26, 2006	Mount Lemmon	Mount Lemmon Survey	·	1.5 km	MPC · JPL
277660	2006 BP_{178}	—	January 27, 2006	Mount Lemmon	Mount Lemmon Survey	KOR	1.5 km	MPC · JPL
277661	2006 BW_{186}	—	January 28, 2006	Anderson Mesa	LONEOS	·	3.5 km	MPC · JPL
277662	2006 BD_{193}	—	January 30, 2006	Kitt Peak	Spacewatch	·	2.2 km	MPC · JPL
277663	2006 BR_{194}	—	January 30, 2006	Kitt Peak	Spacewatch	·	2.3 km	MPC · JPL
277664	2006 BX_{195}	—	January 30, 2006	Kitt Peak	Spacewatch	·	2.1 km	MPC · JPL
277665	2006 BC_{197}	—	January 30, 2006	Kitt Peak	Spacewatch	RAF	1.1 km	MPC · JPL
277666	2006 BN_{200}	—	January 31, 2006	Kitt Peak	Spacewatch	·	2.7 km	MPC · JPL
277667	2006 BM_{203}	—	January 31, 2006	Kitt Peak	Spacewatch	(11882)	2.0 km	MPC · JPL
277668	2006 BO_{203}	—	January 31, 2006	Kitt Peak	Spacewatch	ERI	1.7 km	MPC · JPL
277669	2006 BC_{206}	—	January 31, 2006	Mount Lemmon	Mount Lemmon Survey	RAF	970 m	MPC · JPL
277670	2006 BS_{213}	—	January 22, 2006	Anderson Mesa	LONEOS	·	2.3 km	MPC · JPL
277671	2006 BM_{214}	—	January 23, 2006	Socorro	LINEAR	·	3.8 km	MPC · JPL
277672	2006 BF_{215}	—	January 24, 2006	Socorro	LINEAR	·	2.4 km	MPC · JPL
277673	2006 BG_{217}	—	January 27, 2006	Anderson Mesa	LONEOS	·	2.1 km	MPC · JPL
277674	2006 BE_{226}	—	January 30, 2006	Kitt Peak	Spacewatch	(29841)	1.5 km	MPC · JPL
277675	2006 BQ_{233}	—	January 31, 2006	Kitt Peak	Spacewatch	LEO	1.8 km	MPC · JPL
277676	2006 BV_{237}	—	January 31, 2006	Kitt Peak	Spacewatch	·	2.8 km	MPC · JPL
277677	2006 BH_{245}	—	January 31, 2006	Kitt Peak	Spacewatch	·	2.0 km	MPC · JPL
277678	2006 BD_{250}	—	January 31, 2006	Kitt Peak	Spacewatch	·	2.1 km	MPC · JPL
277679	2006 BR_{251}	—	January 31, 2006	Kitt Peak	Spacewatch	·	2.0 km	MPC · JPL
277680	2006 BD_{259}	—	January 31, 2006	Kitt Peak	Spacewatch	·	2.2 km	MPC · JPL
277681	2006 BT_{263}	—	January 31, 2006	Kitt Peak	Spacewatch	·	2.0 km	MPC · JPL
277682	2006 BN_{266}	—	January 31, 2006	Kitt Peak	Spacewatch	·	2.3 km	MPC · JPL
277683	2006 BX_{267}	—	January 26, 2006	Catalina	CSS	GEF	1.8 km	MPC · JPL
277684	2006 BY_{268}	—	January 27, 2006	Anderson Mesa	LONEOS	·	3.5 km	MPC · JPL
277685	2006 BB_{274}	—	January 31, 2006	Catalina	CSS	V	960 m	MPC · JPL
277686	2006 BX_{275}	—	January 23, 2006	Mount Lemmon	Mount Lemmon Survey	·	1.4 km	MPC · JPL
277687	2006 BC_{276}	—	January 30, 2006	Kitt Peak	Spacewatch	KOR	1.5 km	MPC · JPL
277688	2006 BB_{277}	—	January 30, 2006	Kitt Peak	Spacewatch	AGN	970 m	MPC · JPL
277689	2006 BQ_{277}	—	January 26, 2006	Kitt Peak	Spacewatch	·	2.2 km	MPC · JPL
277690	2006 BS_{278}	—	January 27, 2006	Mount Lemmon	Mount Lemmon Survey	AST	2.0 km	MPC · JPL
277691	2006 CW_{3}	—	February 1, 2006	Mount Lemmon	Mount Lemmon Survey	·	2.0 km	MPC · JPL
277692	2006 CL_{19}	—	February 1, 2006	Mount Lemmon	Mount Lemmon Survey	·	2.6 km	MPC · JPL
277693	2006 CE_{26}	—	February 2, 2006	Kitt Peak	Spacewatch	KOR	2.0 km	MPC · JPL
277694	2006 CV_{34}	—	February 2, 2006	Mount Lemmon	Mount Lemmon Survey	NYS	1.5 km	MPC · JPL
277695	2006 CB_{38}	—	February 2, 2006	Mount Lemmon	Mount Lemmon Survey	·	1.6 km	MPC · JPL
277696	2006 CP_{40}	—	February 2, 2006	Mount Lemmon	Mount Lemmon Survey	·	1.9 km	MPC · JPL
277697	2006 CH_{41}	—	February 2, 2006	Kitt Peak	Spacewatch	GEF	1.3 km	MPC · JPL
277698	2006 CQ_{43}	—	February 2, 2006	Mount Lemmon	Mount Lemmon Survey	·	2.7 km	MPC · JPL
277699	2006 CT_{47}	—	February 3, 2006	Mount Lemmon	Mount Lemmon Survey	·	1.4 km	MPC · JPL
277700	2006 CC_{57}	—	February 4, 2006	Mount Lemmon	Mount Lemmon Survey	·	2.3 km	MPC · JPL

== 277701–277800 ==
back to top

Designation			Discovery			Properties		Ref
Permanent	Provisional	Named after	Date	Site	Discoverer(s)	Category	Diam.	Ref
277701	2006 CD_{61}	—	February 4, 2006	Catalina	CSS	MAR	2.8 km	MPC · JPL
277702	2006 CU_{65}	—	February 1, 2006	Kitt Peak	Spacewatch	·	2.0 km	MPC · JPL
277703	2006 CL_{66}	—	February 2, 2006	Kitt Peak	Spacewatch	PAD	1.7 km	MPC · JPL
277704	2006 DC	—	February 20, 2006	Mayhill	Lowe, A.	·	3.0 km	MPC · JPL
277705	2006 DR_{4}	—	February 20, 2006	Kitt Peak	Spacewatch	·	1.9 km	MPC · JPL
277706	2006 DU_{11}	—	February 20, 2006	Kitt Peak	Spacewatch	·	2.7 km	MPC · JPL
277707	2006 DG_{14}	—	February 22, 2006	Catalina	CSS	·	4.3 km	MPC · JPL
277708	2006 DM_{22}	—	February 20, 2006	Kitt Peak	Spacewatch	AGN	1.3 km	MPC · JPL
277709	2006 DG_{24}	—	February 20, 2006	Socorro	LINEAR	DOR	3.0 km	MPC · JPL
277710	2006 DR_{24}	—	February 20, 2006	Kitt Peak	Spacewatch	·	2.2 km	MPC · JPL
277711	2006 DA_{27}	—	February 20, 2006	Kitt Peak	Spacewatch	HOF	3.7 km	MPC · JPL
277712	2006 DU_{30}	—	February 20, 2006	Kitt Peak	Spacewatch	·	2.3 km	MPC · JPL
277713	2006 DY_{30}	—	February 20, 2006	Kitt Peak	Spacewatch	MRX	1.3 km	MPC · JPL
277714	2006 DB_{31}	—	February 20, 2006	Kitt Peak	Spacewatch	·	2.6 km	MPC · JPL
277715	2006 DW_{31}	—	February 20, 2006	Mount Lemmon	Mount Lemmon Survey	·	2.1 km	MPC · JPL
277716	2006 DS_{32}	—	February 20, 2006	Mount Lemmon	Mount Lemmon Survey	KOR	1.6 km	MPC · JPL
277717	2006 DR_{33}	—	February 20, 2006	Kitt Peak	Spacewatch	·	2.8 km	MPC · JPL
277718	2006 DR_{43}	—	February 20, 2006	Kitt Peak	Spacewatch	ADE	2.5 km	MPC · JPL
277719	2006 DF_{45}	—	February 20, 2006	Kitt Peak	Spacewatch	PAD	1.9 km	MPC · JPL
277720	2006 DJ_{49}	—	February 21, 2006	Catalina	CSS	DOR	3.2 km	MPC · JPL
277721	2006 DS_{50}	—	February 23, 2006	Kitt Peak	Spacewatch	·	3.6 km	MPC · JPL
277722	2006 DH_{52}	—	February 24, 2006	Kitt Peak	Spacewatch	·	2.0 km	MPC · JPL
277723	2006 DQ_{55}	—	February 24, 2006	Mount Lemmon	Mount Lemmon Survey	NEM	2.8 km	MPC · JPL
277724	2006 DN_{57}	—	February 24, 2006	Mount Lemmon	Mount Lemmon Survey	·	1.8 km	MPC · JPL
277725	2006 DR_{57}	—	February 24, 2006	Mount Lemmon	Mount Lemmon Survey	·	2.3 km	MPC · JPL
277726	2006 DX_{62}	—	February 25, 2006	Mayhill	Lowe, A.	EUP	5.9 km	MPC · JPL
277727	2006 DL_{70}	—	February 21, 2006	Mount Lemmon	Mount Lemmon Survey	·	2.5 km	MPC · JPL
277728	2006 DW_{74}	—	February 24, 2006	Kitt Peak	Spacewatch	DOR	2.5 km	MPC · JPL
277729	2006 DY_{75}	—	February 24, 2006	Kitt Peak	Spacewatch	·	2.3 km	MPC · JPL
277730	2006 DO_{78}	—	February 24, 2006	Kitt Peak	Spacewatch	·	2.9 km	MPC · JPL
277731	2006 DO_{80}	—	February 24, 2006	Kitt Peak	Spacewatch	·	3.0 km	MPC · JPL
277732	2006 DW_{81}	—	February 24, 2006	Kitt Peak	Spacewatch	WIT	1.3 km	MPC · JPL
277733	2006 DL_{88}	—	February 24, 2006	Kitt Peak	Spacewatch	EOS	2.0 km	MPC · JPL
277734	2006 DS_{88}	—	February 24, 2006	Kitt Peak	Spacewatch	·	1.8 km	MPC · JPL
277735	2006 DV_{88}	—	February 24, 2006	Kitt Peak	Spacewatch	·	2.6 km	MPC · JPL
277736	2006 DL_{92}	—	February 24, 2006	Kitt Peak	Spacewatch	AST	2.2 km	MPC · JPL
277737	2006 DW_{93}	—	February 24, 2006	Kitt Peak	Spacewatch	·	3.4 km	MPC · JPL
277738	2006 DK_{95}	—	February 24, 2006	Kitt Peak	Spacewatch	·	2.3 km	MPC · JPL
277739	2006 DN_{95}	—	February 24, 2006	Kitt Peak	Spacewatch	·	6.3 km	MPC · JPL
277740	2006 DV_{99}	—	February 25, 2006	Kitt Peak	Spacewatch	AGN	1.3 km	MPC · JPL
277741	2006 DD_{102}	—	February 25, 2006	Kitt Peak	Spacewatch	·	1.9 km	MPC · JPL
277742	2006 DJ_{104}	—	February 25, 2006	Kitt Peak	Spacewatch	·	2.6 km	MPC · JPL
277743	2006 DJ_{105}	—	February 25, 2006	Mount Lemmon	Mount Lemmon Survey	·	2.8 km	MPC · JPL
277744	2006 DV_{106}	—	February 25, 2006	Kitt Peak	Spacewatch	PHO	1.1 km	MPC · JPL
277745	2006 DK_{107}	—	February 25, 2006	Mount Lemmon	Mount Lemmon Survey	·	2.4 km	MPC · JPL
277746	2006 DS_{107}	—	February 25, 2006	Kitt Peak	Spacewatch	·	4.0 km	MPC · JPL
277747	2006 DQ_{108}	—	February 25, 2006	Kitt Peak	Spacewatch	MRX	1.4 km	MPC · JPL
277748	2006 DC_{109}	—	February 25, 2006	Kitt Peak	Spacewatch	(13314)	2.5 km	MPC · JPL
277749	2006 DD_{111}	—	February 26, 2006	Anderson Mesa	LONEOS	EUP	3.9 km	MPC · JPL
277750	2006 DW_{116}	—	February 27, 2006	Catalina	CSS	·	3.0 km	MPC · JPL
277751	2006 DK_{121}	—	February 22, 2006	Catalina	CSS	·	2.3 km	MPC · JPL
277752	2006 DE_{129}	—	February 25, 2006	Kitt Peak	Spacewatch	·	2.6 km	MPC · JPL
277753	2006 DZ_{130}	—	February 25, 2006	Kitt Peak	Spacewatch	HOF	3.8 km	MPC · JPL
277754	2006 DG_{131}	—	February 25, 2006	Kitt Peak	Spacewatch	WIT	1.1 km	MPC · JPL
277755	2006 DJ_{132}	—	February 25, 2006	Kitt Peak	Spacewatch	·	2.2 km	MPC · JPL
277756	2006 DK_{132}	—	February 25, 2006	Kitt Peak	Spacewatch	·	2.0 km	MPC · JPL
277757	2006 DS_{140}	—	February 25, 2006	Kitt Peak	Spacewatch	·	2.3 km	MPC · JPL
277758	2006 DF_{141}	—	February 25, 2006	Kitt Peak	Spacewatch	·	2.7 km	MPC · JPL
277759	2006 DM_{141}	—	February 25, 2006	Kitt Peak	Spacewatch	·	1.8 km	MPC · JPL
277760	2006 DB_{147}	—	February 25, 2006	Kitt Peak	Spacewatch	·	3.1 km	MPC · JPL
277761	2006 DM_{147}	—	February 25, 2006	Mount Lemmon	Mount Lemmon Survey	AST	2.8 km	MPC · JPL
277762	2006 DY_{150}	—	February 25, 2006	Kitt Peak	Spacewatch	·	2.6 km	MPC · JPL
277763	2006 DN_{153}	—	February 25, 2006	Kitt Peak	Spacewatch	DOR	3.4 km	MPC · JPL
277764	2006 DA_{157}	—	February 27, 2006	Kitt Peak	Spacewatch	·	3.6 km	MPC · JPL
277765	2006 DA_{159}	—	February 27, 2006	Kitt Peak	Spacewatch	·	2.4 km	MPC · JPL
277766	2006 DH_{160}	—	February 27, 2006	Kitt Peak	Spacewatch	·	1.9 km	MPC · JPL
277767	2006 DP_{160}	—	February 27, 2006	Kitt Peak	Spacewatch	EOS	1.5 km	MPC · JPL
277768	2006 DC_{163}	—	February 27, 2006	Mount Lemmon	Mount Lemmon Survey	AGN	1.5 km	MPC · JPL
277769	2006 DG_{172}	—	February 27, 2006	Kitt Peak	Spacewatch	·	2.6 km	MPC · JPL
277770	2006 DL_{176}	—	February 27, 2006	Mount Lemmon	Mount Lemmon Survey	·	2.6 km	MPC · JPL
277771	2006 DH_{177}	—	February 27, 2006	Mount Lemmon	Mount Lemmon Survey	·	2.0 km	MPC · JPL
277772	2006 DP_{185}	—	February 27, 2006	Kitt Peak	Spacewatch	·	2.5 km	MPC · JPL
277773	2006 DS_{186}	—	February 27, 2006	Kitt Peak	Spacewatch	KOR	1.5 km	MPC · JPL
277774	2006 DG_{187}	—	February 27, 2006	Kitt Peak	Spacewatch	·	2.8 km	MPC · JPL
277775	2006 DY_{189}	—	February 27, 2006	Mount Lemmon	Mount Lemmon Survey	HOF	2.8 km	MPC · JPL
277776	2006 DQ_{200}	—	February 24, 2006	Catalina	CSS	·	8.4 km	MPC · JPL
277777	2006 DT_{202}	—	February 22, 2006	Anderson Mesa	LONEOS	·	1.7 km	MPC · JPL
277778	2006 DC_{204}	—	February 24, 2006	Catalina	CSS	·	3.1 km	MPC · JPL
277779	2006 DQ_{204}	—	February 27, 2006	Catalina	CSS	EUN	1.8 km	MPC · JPL
277780	2006 DR_{206}	—	February 25, 2006	Kitt Peak	Spacewatch	HOF	2.8 km	MPC · JPL
277781	2006 DK_{209}	—	February 27, 2006	Kitt Peak	Spacewatch	·	2.3 km	MPC · JPL
277782	2006 DX_{210}	—	February 24, 2006	Kitt Peak	Spacewatch	·	2.1 km	MPC · JPL
277783	2006 DF_{211}	—	February 24, 2006	Kitt Peak	Spacewatch	AGN	1.2 km	MPC · JPL
277784	2006 DV_{211}	—	February 24, 2006	Mount Lemmon	Mount Lemmon Survey	·	2.2 km	MPC · JPL
277785	2006 DX_{211}	—	February 24, 2006	Mount Lemmon	Mount Lemmon Survey	·	2.6 km	MPC · JPL
277786	2006 DC_{212}	—	February 25, 2006	Kitt Peak	Spacewatch	WIT	1.1 km	MPC · JPL
277787	2006 DG_{216}	—	February 24, 2006	Mount Lemmon	Mount Lemmon Survey	HOF	3.4 km	MPC · JPL
277788	2006 EK_{2}	—	March 3, 2006	Mount Nyukasa	Japan Aerospace Exploration Agency	KOR	1.6 km	MPC · JPL
277789	2006 ES_{9}	—	March 2, 2006	Kitt Peak	Spacewatch	KOR	1.4 km	MPC · JPL
277790	2006 EG_{10}	—	March 2, 2006	Kitt Peak	Spacewatch	NEM	3.0 km	MPC · JPL
277791	2006 EM_{12}	—	March 2, 2006	Kitt Peak	Spacewatch	·	3.6 km	MPC · JPL
277792	2006 EV_{14}	—	March 2, 2006	Kitt Peak	Spacewatch	AGN	1.7 km	MPC · JPL
277793	2006 ET_{23}	—	March 3, 2006	Kitt Peak	Spacewatch	(12739)	1.9 km	MPC · JPL
277794	2006 EY_{34}	—	March 3, 2006	Kitt Peak	Spacewatch	AGN	1.4 km	MPC · JPL
277795	2006 EJ_{35}	—	March 3, 2006	Kitt Peak	Spacewatch	·	2.9 km	MPC · JPL
277796	2006 EY_{44}	—	March 3, 2006	Mount Nyukasa	Japan Aerospace Exploration Agency	(17392)	2.1 km	MPC · JPL
277797	2006 EZ_{55}	—	March 5, 2006	Kitt Peak	Spacewatch	·	2.3 km	MPC · JPL
277798	2006 EA_{57}	—	March 5, 2006	Kitt Peak	Spacewatch	·	2.3 km	MPC · JPL
277799	2006 EM_{73}	—	March 2, 2006	Kitt Peak	Spacewatch	·	1.8 km	MPC · JPL
277800	2006 EV_{73}	—	March 5, 2006	Kitt Peak	Spacewatch	CYB	6.8 km	MPC · JPL

== 277801–277900 ==
back to top

Designation			Discovery			Properties		Ref
Permanent	Provisional	Named after	Date	Site	Discoverer(s)	Category	Diam.	Ref
277801	2006 FC_{5}	—	March 23, 2006	Mount Lemmon	Mount Lemmon Survey	·	2.1 km	MPC · JPL
277802	2006 FH_{6}	—	March 23, 2006	Catalina	CSS	·	3.7 km	MPC · JPL
277803	2006 FN_{7}	—	March 23, 2006	Kitt Peak	Spacewatch	·	4.0 km	MPC · JPL
277804	2006 FJ_{8}	—	March 23, 2006	Mount Lemmon	Mount Lemmon Survey	AST	3.0 km	MPC · JPL
277805	2006 FS_{19}	—	March 23, 2006	Mount Lemmon	Mount Lemmon Survey	·	1.9 km	MPC · JPL
277806	2006 FC_{21}	—	March 24, 2006	Kitt Peak	Spacewatch	·	2.6 km	MPC · JPL
277807	2006 FH_{24}	—	March 24, 2006	Kitt Peak	Spacewatch	·	5.1 km	MPC · JPL
277808	2006 FA_{25}	—	March 24, 2006	Kitt Peak	Spacewatch	·	1.9 km	MPC · JPL
277809	2006 FP_{33}	—	March 25, 2006	Mount Lemmon	Mount Lemmon Survey	EOS	2.3 km	MPC · JPL
277810	2006 FV_{35}	—	March 29, 2006	Kitt Peak	Spacewatch	APO	160 m	MPC · JPL
277811	2006 FM_{36}	—	March 30, 2006	Lulin	Q. Ye	·	3.1 km	MPC · JPL
277812	2006 FU_{38}	—	March 23, 2006	Kitt Peak	Spacewatch	·	3.7 km	MPC · JPL
277813	2006 FJ_{46}	—	March 26, 2006	Anderson Mesa	LONEOS	·	4.1 km	MPC · JPL
277814	2006 FJ_{54}	—	March 24, 2006	Kitt Peak	Spacewatch	·	1.9 km	MPC · JPL
277815	2006 FB_{55}	—	March 23, 2006	Mount Lemmon	Mount Lemmon Survey	·	2.4 km	MPC · JPL
277816 Varese	2006 GL	Varese	April 2, 2006	Schiaparelli	L. Buzzi, Luppi, F.	H	440 m	MPC · JPL
277817	2006 GT	—	April 2, 2006	Piszkéstető	K. Sárneczky	·	3.7 km	MPC · JPL
277818	2006 GR_{18}	—	April 2, 2006	Kitt Peak	Spacewatch	KOR	1.5 km	MPC · JPL
277819	2006 GL_{19}	—	April 2, 2006	Kitt Peak	Spacewatch	KOR	1.3 km	MPC · JPL
277820	2006 GT_{29}	—	April 2, 2006	Kitt Peak	Spacewatch	·	2.0 km	MPC · JPL
277821	2006 GY_{29}	—	April 2, 2006	Catalina	CSS	·	6.3 km	MPC · JPL
277822	2006 GV_{44}	—	April 7, 2006	Mount Lemmon	Mount Lemmon Survey	AEO	1.5 km	MPC · JPL
277823	2006 GV_{50}	—	April 2, 2006	Anderson Mesa	LONEOS	·	6.2 km	MPC · JPL
277824	2006 HB_{2}	—	April 18, 2006	Catalina	CSS	·	4.7 km	MPC · JPL
277825	2006 HY_{3}	—	April 18, 2006	Kitt Peak	Spacewatch	NAE	3.2 km	MPC · JPL
277826	2006 HC_{10}	—	April 19, 2006	Kitt Peak	Spacewatch	TRE	4.2 km	MPC · JPL
277827	2006 HA_{15}	—	April 19, 2006	Mount Lemmon	Mount Lemmon Survey	·	1.9 km	MPC · JPL
277828	2006 HA_{23}	—	April 20, 2006	Kitt Peak	Spacewatch	KOR	1.4 km	MPC · JPL
277829	2006 HL_{25}	—	April 20, 2006	Kitt Peak	Spacewatch	·	2.5 km	MPC · JPL
277830	2006 HR_{29}	—	April 24, 2006	Siding Spring	SSS	ATE	260 m	MPC · JPL
277831	2006 HL_{37}	—	April 21, 2006	Kitt Peak	Spacewatch	·	2.8 km	MPC · JPL
277832	2006 HH_{41}	—	April 21, 2006	Kitt Peak	Spacewatch	·	2.4 km	MPC · JPL
277833	2006 HU_{45}	—	April 25, 2006	Kitt Peak	Spacewatch	KOR	1.6 km	MPC · JPL
277834	2006 HA_{56}	—	April 26, 2006	Catalina	CSS	H	710 m	MPC · JPL
277835	2006 HQ_{60}	—	April 26, 2006	Anderson Mesa	LONEOS	·	2.8 km	MPC · JPL
277836	2006 HC_{63}	—	April 24, 2006	Kitt Peak	Spacewatch	KOR	1.5 km	MPC · JPL
277837	2006 HO_{65}	—	April 24, 2006	Kitt Peak	Spacewatch	·	2.0 km	MPC · JPL
277838	2006 HJ_{69}	—	April 24, 2006	Mount Lemmon	Mount Lemmon Survey	·	3.5 km	MPC · JPL
277839	2006 HS_{71}	—	April 25, 2006	Kitt Peak	Spacewatch	·	4.0 km	MPC · JPL
277840	2006 HC_{75}	—	April 25, 2006	Kitt Peak	Spacewatch	EOS	1.9 km	MPC · JPL
277841	2006 HE_{79}	—	April 26, 2006	Kitt Peak	Spacewatch	VER	3.2 km	MPC · JPL
277842	2006 HB_{84}	—	April 26, 2006	Kitt Peak	Spacewatch	·	5.4 km	MPC · JPL
277843	2006 HH_{86}	—	April 27, 2006	Kitt Peak	Spacewatch	NYS	960 m	MPC · JPL
277844	2006 HL_{92}	—	April 29, 2006	Kitt Peak	Spacewatch	·	3.5 km	MPC · JPL
277845	2006 HA_{93}	—	April 29, 2006	Kitt Peak	Spacewatch	EOS	2.2 km	MPC · JPL
277846	2006 HB_{95}	—	April 30, 2006	Kitt Peak	Spacewatch	·	3.3 km	MPC · JPL
277847	2006 HP_{101}	—	April 30, 2006	Kitt Peak	Spacewatch	EOS	2.5 km	MPC · JPL
277848	2006 HS_{101}	—	April 30, 2006	Kitt Peak	Spacewatch	·	2.6 km	MPC · JPL
277849	2006 HR_{104}	—	April 18, 2006	Catalina	CSS	·	2.9 km	MPC · JPL
277850	2006 HG_{107}	—	April 30, 2006	Kitt Peak	Spacewatch	·	3.9 km	MPC · JPL
277851	2006 HJ_{113}	—	April 25, 2006	Kitt Peak	Spacewatch	·	3.2 km	MPC · JPL
277852	2006 HG_{120}	—	April 30, 2006	Kitt Peak	Spacewatch	·	3.3 km	MPC · JPL
277853	2006 HX_{121}	—	April 27, 2006	Catalina	CSS	H	870 m	MPC · JPL
277854	2006 HR_{131}	—	April 26, 2006	Cerro Tololo	M. W. Buie	·	3.6 km	MPC · JPL
277855	2006 HN_{150}	—	April 22, 2006	La Silla	Behrend, R.	·	2.4 km	MPC · JPL
277856	2006 JH_{7}	—	May 1, 2006	Kitt Peak	Spacewatch	·	3.3 km	MPC · JPL
277857	2006 JD_{10}	—	May 1, 2006	Kitt Peak	Spacewatch	·	2.4 km	MPC · JPL
277858	2006 JF_{12}	—	May 1, 2006	Kitt Peak	Spacewatch	EOS	2.0 km	MPC · JPL
277859	2006 JJ_{14}	—	May 4, 2006	Kitt Peak	Spacewatch	·	2.8 km	MPC · JPL
277860	2006 JY_{17}	—	May 2, 2006	Mount Lemmon	Mount Lemmon Survey	·	3.4 km	MPC · JPL
277861	2006 JR_{18}	—	May 2, 2006	Mount Lemmon	Mount Lemmon Survey	·	2.8 km	MPC · JPL
277862	2006 JK_{20}	—	May 2, 2006	Kitt Peak	Spacewatch	EOS	2.3 km	MPC · JPL
277863	2006 JP_{20}	—	May 2, 2006	Kitt Peak	Spacewatch	·	2.4 km	MPC · JPL
277864	2006 JZ_{22}	—	May 3, 2006	Mount Lemmon	Mount Lemmon Survey	·	2.1 km	MPC · JPL
277865	2006 JX_{27}	—	May 2, 2006	Mount Lemmon	Mount Lemmon Survey	·	2.3 km	MPC · JPL
277866	2006 JP_{32}	—	May 3, 2006	Kitt Peak	Spacewatch	·	3.2 km	MPC · JPL
277867	2006 JX_{33}	—	May 4, 2006	Kitt Peak	Spacewatch	·	4.7 km	MPC · JPL
277868	2006 JA_{34}	—	May 4, 2006	Kitt Peak	Spacewatch	EOS	2.1 km	MPC · JPL
277869	2006 JR_{35}	—	May 4, 2006	Kitt Peak	Spacewatch	·	3.8 km	MPC · JPL
277870	2006 JT_{35}	—	May 4, 2006	Kitt Peak	Spacewatch	·	3.0 km	MPC · JPL
277871	2006 JA_{36}	—	May 4, 2006	Kitt Peak	Spacewatch	·	2.5 km	MPC · JPL
277872	2006 JG_{37}	—	May 5, 2006	Kitt Peak	Spacewatch	·	1.9 km	MPC · JPL
277873	2006 JQ_{38}	—	May 6, 2006	Kitt Peak	Spacewatch	EOS	2.6 km	MPC · JPL
277874	2006 JV_{47}	—	May 4, 2006	Kitt Peak	Spacewatch	·	4.4 km	MPC · JPL
277875	2006 JM_{49}	—	May 1, 2006	Kitt Peak	Spacewatch	·	2.9 km	MPC · JPL
277876	2006 JG_{50}	—	May 2, 2006	Mount Lemmon	Mount Lemmon Survey	·	1.9 km	MPC · JPL
277877	2006 JW_{54}	—	May 8, 2006	Mount Lemmon	Mount Lemmon Survey	·	3.6 km	MPC · JPL
277878	2006 JG_{55}	—	May 9, 2006	Mount Lemmon	Mount Lemmon Survey	·	3.1 km	MPC · JPL
277879	2006 JE_{61}	—	May 1, 2006	Catalina	CSS	BRA	1.9 km	MPC · JPL
277880	2006 JB_{64}	—	May 1, 2006	Kitt Peak	M. W. Buie	EOS	1.7 km	MPC · JPL
277881	2006 JC_{65}	—	May 1, 2006	Kitt Peak	M. W. Buie	·	2.4 km	MPC · JPL
277882	2006 JA_{67}	—	May 1, 2006	Kitt Peak	M. W. Buie	·	2.8 km	MPC · JPL
277883 Basu	2006 JA_{69}	Basu	May 1, 2006	Mauna Kea	P. A. Wiegert	·	2.4 km	MPC · JPL
277884	2006 KA_{6}	—	May 19, 2006	Mount Lemmon	Mount Lemmon Survey	·	4.2 km	MPC · JPL
277885	2006 KL_{6}	—	May 19, 2006	Mount Lemmon	Mount Lemmon Survey	·	3.7 km	MPC · JPL
277886	2006 KJ_{10}	—	May 19, 2006	Mount Lemmon	Mount Lemmon Survey	·	3.6 km	MPC · JPL
277887	2006 KF_{17}	—	May 20, 2006	Catalina	CSS	·	4.0 km	MPC · JPL
277888	2006 KL_{18}	—	May 21, 2006	Kitt Peak	Spacewatch	·	3.3 km	MPC · JPL
277889	2006 KJ_{31}	—	May 20, 2006	Kitt Peak	Spacewatch	·	2.4 km	MPC · JPL
277890	2006 KP_{31}	—	May 20, 2006	Kitt Peak	Spacewatch	KOR	1.5 km	MPC · JPL
277891	2006 KJ_{32}	—	May 20, 2006	Kitt Peak	Spacewatch	·	2.2 km	MPC · JPL
277892	2006 KA_{34}	—	May 20, 2006	Kitt Peak	Spacewatch	·	3.1 km	MPC · JPL
277893	2006 KF_{40}	—	May 18, 2006	Palomar	NEAT	·	3.2 km	MPC · JPL
277894	2006 KG_{41}	—	October 15, 2002	Palomar	NEAT	·	3.7 km	MPC · JPL
277895	2006 KP_{45}	—	May 21, 2006	Kitt Peak	Spacewatch	VER	4.6 km	MPC · JPL
277896	2006 KY_{45}	—	May 21, 2006	Mount Lemmon	Mount Lemmon Survey	THM	2.8 km	MPC · JPL
277897	2006 KZ_{45}	—	May 21, 2006	Mount Lemmon	Mount Lemmon Survey	·	3.7 km	MPC · JPL
277898	2006 KY_{48}	—	May 21, 2006	Kitt Peak	Spacewatch	·	2.8 km	MPC · JPL
277899	2006 KC_{49}	—	May 21, 2006	Kitt Peak	Spacewatch	·	1.9 km	MPC · JPL
277900	2006 KY_{51}	—	May 21, 2006	Kitt Peak	Spacewatch	·	4.1 km	MPC · JPL

== 277901–278000 ==
back to top

Designation			Discovery			Properties		Ref
Permanent	Provisional	Named after	Date	Site	Discoverer(s)	Category	Diam.	Ref
277901	2006 KG_{55}	—	May 21, 2006	Kitt Peak	Spacewatch	·	4.3 km	MPC · JPL
277902	2006 KO_{59}	—	May 22, 2006	Kitt Peak	Spacewatch	·	2.8 km	MPC · JPL
277903	2006 KT_{62}	—	May 22, 2006	Kitt Peak	Spacewatch	EOS	1.9 km	MPC · JPL
277904	2006 KM_{67}	—	May 24, 2006	Mount Lemmon	Mount Lemmon Survey	·	3.0 km	MPC · JPL
277905	2006 KP_{69}	—	May 22, 2006	Kitt Peak	Spacewatch	·	3.5 km	MPC · JPL
277906	2006 KG_{72}	—	May 22, 2006	Kitt Peak	Spacewatch	·	2.6 km	MPC · JPL
277907	2006 KY_{72}	—	May 23, 2006	Kitt Peak	Spacewatch	·	2.8 km	MPC · JPL
277908	2006 KU_{73}	—	May 23, 2006	Kitt Peak	Spacewatch	EOS	2.1 km	MPC · JPL
277909	2006 KB_{74}	—	May 23, 2006	Kitt Peak	Spacewatch	EMA	3.6 km	MPC · JPL
277910	2006 KS_{74}	—	May 23, 2006	Kitt Peak	Spacewatch	EOS	2.0 km	MPC · JPL
277911	2006 KQ_{78}	—	May 24, 2006	Mount Lemmon	Mount Lemmon Survey	·	3.4 km	MPC · JPL
277912	2006 KN_{85}	—	May 20, 2006	Catalina	CSS	·	2.7 km	MPC · JPL
277913	2006 KU_{87}	—	May 24, 2006	Kitt Peak	Spacewatch	THM	2.4 km	MPC · JPL
277914	2006 KX_{87}	—	May 24, 2006	Kitt Peak	Spacewatch	·	3.1 km	MPC · JPL
277915	2006 KB_{88}	—	May 24, 2006	Kitt Peak	Spacewatch	·	3.6 km	MPC · JPL
277916	2006 KF_{92}	—	May 25, 2006	Kitt Peak	Spacewatch	·	4.1 km	MPC · JPL
277917	2006 KU_{92}	—	May 25, 2006	Kitt Peak	Spacewatch	·	3.9 km	MPC · JPL
277918	2006 KY_{95}	—	May 25, 2006	Palomar	NEAT	·	7.6 km	MPC · JPL
277919	2006 KT_{97}	—	May 26, 2006	Mount Lemmon	Mount Lemmon Survey	·	2.5 km	MPC · JPL
277920	2006 KT_{98}	—	May 26, 2006	Kitt Peak	Spacewatch	·	3.3 km	MPC · JPL
277921	2006 KV_{101}	—	May 27, 2006	Kitt Peak	Spacewatch	·	3.2 km	MPC · JPL
277922	2006 KX_{101}	—	May 27, 2006	Kitt Peak	Spacewatch	H	600 m	MPC · JPL
277923	2006 KN_{103}	—	May 29, 2006	Reedy Creek	J. Broughton	H	870 m	MPC · JPL
277924	2006 KS_{104}	—	May 28, 2006	Kitt Peak	Spacewatch	EOS	2.3 km	MPC · JPL
277925	2006 KX_{104}	—	May 28, 2006	Kitt Peak	Spacewatch	EUP	3.2 km	MPC · JPL
277926	2006 KC_{106}	—	May 31, 2006	Mount Lemmon	Mount Lemmon Survey	·	3.7 km	MPC · JPL
277927	2006 KG_{113}	—	May 19, 2006	Anderson Mesa	LONEOS	·	3.4 km	MPC · JPL
277928	2006 KV_{113}	—	May 22, 2006	Siding Spring	SSS	·	2.8 km	MPC · JPL
277929	2006 KU_{116}	—	May 29, 2006	Kitt Peak	Spacewatch	·	3.6 km	MPC · JPL
277930	2006 KG_{118}	—	May 23, 2006	Catalina	CSS	H	610 m	MPC · JPL
277931	2006 KJ_{119}	—	May 31, 2006	Kitt Peak	Spacewatch	·	2.5 km	MPC · JPL
277932	2006 KV_{122}	—	May 22, 2006	Kitt Peak	Spacewatch	VER	3.2 km	MPC · JPL
277933	2006 KA_{123}	—	May 27, 2006	Kitt Peak	Spacewatch	·	3.5 km	MPC · JPL
277934	2006 KU_{129}	—	May 20, 2006	Siding Spring	SSS	·	4.3 km	MPC · JPL
277935	2006 LK_{4}	—	June 9, 2006	Palomar	NEAT	·	5.3 km	MPC · JPL
277936	2006 OO	—	July 18, 2006	Ottmarsheim	C. Rinner	·	2.9 km	MPC · JPL
277937	2006 OK_{29}	—	January 20, 2001	Socorro	LINEAR	·	1.4 km	MPC · JPL
277938	2006 PH_{14}	—	August 15, 2006	Palomar	NEAT	·	4.9 km	MPC · JPL
277939	2006 PO_{18}	—	August 13, 2006	Palomar	NEAT	·	4.6 km	MPC · JPL
277940	2006 PK_{28}	—	August 14, 2006	Siding Spring	SSS	H	950 m	MPC · JPL
277941	2006 PF_{33}	—	August 13, 2006	Siding Spring	SSS	THB	5.8 km	MPC · JPL
277942	2006 PK_{38}	—	August 14, 2006	Palomar	NEAT	·	1.8 km	MPC · JPL
277943	2006 QG_{1}	—	August 16, 2006	Siding Spring	SSS	·	2.8 km	MPC · JPL
277944	2006 QM_{1}	—	August 16, 2006	Siding Spring	SSS	V	1.0 km	MPC · JPL
277945	2006 QR_{5}	—	August 16, 2006	Reedy Creek	J. Broughton	·	4.0 km	MPC · JPL
277946	2006 QH_{62}	—	August 22, 2006	Palomar	NEAT	·	3.8 km	MPC · JPL
277947	2006 QC_{119}	—	August 28, 2006	Socorro	LINEAR	·	5.0 km	MPC · JPL
277948	2006 QF_{144}	—	August 25, 2006	Reedy Creek	J. Broughton	·	5.3 km	MPC · JPL
277949	2006 RE_{4}	—	September 12, 2006	Catalina	CSS	H	790 m	MPC · JPL
277950	2006 RC_{122}	—	September 14, 2006	Kitt Peak	Spacewatch	·	730 m	MPC · JPL
277951	2006 SQ_{13}	—	September 17, 2006	Kitt Peak	Spacewatch	·	810 m	MPC · JPL
277952	2006 SA_{18}	—	September 17, 2006	Kitt Peak	Spacewatch	(5)	1.2 km	MPC · JPL
277953	2006 SK_{24}	—	September 16, 2006	Catalina	CSS	CYB	5.9 km	MPC · JPL
277954	2006 SB_{33}	—	September 17, 2006	Kitt Peak	Spacewatch	·	1.9 km	MPC · JPL
277955	2006 SL_{75}	—	September 19, 2006	Kitt Peak	Spacewatch	KON	2.8 km	MPC · JPL
277956	2006 SV_{107}	—	September 19, 2006	Anderson Mesa	LONEOS	·	760 m	MPC · JPL
277957	2006 SS_{119}	—	September 18, 2006	Catalina	CSS	·	1 km	MPC · JPL
277958	2006 SP_{134}	—	September 26, 2006	Kitt Peak	Spacewatch	APO +1km	1.5 km	MPC · JPL
277959	2006 SB_{187}	—	September 25, 2006	Mount Lemmon	Mount Lemmon Survey	·	1.5 km	MPC · JPL
277960	2006 SP_{211}	—	September 26, 2006	Catalina	CSS	·	1.4 km	MPC · JPL
277961	2006 SU_{273}	—	September 27, 2006	Mount Lemmon	Mount Lemmon Survey	·	1.0 km	MPC · JPL
277962	2006 SV_{284}	—	September 29, 2006	Anderson Mesa	LONEOS	·	1.3 km	MPC · JPL
277963	2006 SZ_{297}	—	September 25, 2006	Kitt Peak	Spacewatch	·	760 m	MPC · JPL
277964	2006 SY_{303}	—	September 27, 2006	Mount Lemmon	Mount Lemmon Survey	·	1.7 km	MPC · JPL
277965	2006 SE_{318}	—	September 27, 2006	Kitt Peak	Spacewatch	·	830 m	MPC · JPL
277966	2006 SR_{360}	—	September 30, 2006	Mount Lemmon	Mount Lemmon Survey	·	750 m	MPC · JPL
277967	2006 ST_{366}	—	September 16, 2006	Catalina	CSS	·	2.2 km	MPC · JPL
277968	2006 ST_{388}	—	September 30, 2006	Apache Point	A. C. Becker	·	2.3 km	MPC · JPL
277969	2006 SC_{391}	—	September 17, 2006	Kitt Peak	Spacewatch	·	1.4 km	MPC · JPL
277970	2006 SR_{391}	—	September 18, 2006	Kitt Peak	Spacewatch	·	1.1 km	MPC · JPL
277971	2006 TP_{4}	—	October 2, 2006	Mount Lemmon	Mount Lemmon Survey	(5)	1.2 km	MPC · JPL
277972	2006 TF_{22}	—	October 11, 2006	Kitt Peak	Spacewatch	·	2.4 km	MPC · JPL
277973	2006 TZ_{28}	—	October 12, 2006	Kitt Peak	Spacewatch	·	2.1 km	MPC · JPL
277974	2006 TJ_{37}	—	October 12, 2006	Kitt Peak	Spacewatch	·	680 m	MPC · JPL
277975	2006 TT_{42}	—	October 12, 2006	Kitt Peak	Spacewatch	·	2.6 km	MPC · JPL
277976	2006 TE_{52}	—	October 12, 2006	Kitt Peak	Spacewatch	·	1.9 km	MPC · JPL
277977	2006 TG_{52}	—	October 12, 2006	Kitt Peak	Spacewatch	·	1.8 km	MPC · JPL
277978	2006 TB_{55}	—	October 12, 2006	Palomar	NEAT	·	1.4 km	MPC · JPL
277979	2006 TG_{55}	—	October 12, 2006	Palomar	NEAT	RAF	970 m	MPC · JPL
277980	2006 TZ_{57}	—	October 15, 2006	Catalina	CSS	·	640 m	MPC · JPL
277981	2006 TL_{75}	—	October 11, 2006	Palomar	NEAT	(5)	1.4 km	MPC · JPL
277982	2006 TF_{76}	—	October 11, 2006	Palomar	NEAT	·	830 m	MPC · JPL
277983	2006 TQ_{81}	—	October 13, 2006	Kitt Peak	Spacewatch	·	1.3 km	MPC · JPL
277984	2006 TJ_{109}	—	October 3, 2006	Mount Lemmon	Mount Lemmon Survey	3:2	7.8 km	MPC · JPL
277985	2006 TA_{110}	—	October 12, 2006	Palomar	NEAT	·	2.1 km	MPC · JPL
277986	2006 TN_{118}	—	October 3, 2006	Apache Point	A. C. Becker	·	1.4 km	MPC · JPL
277987	2006 TW_{126}	—	October 2, 2006	Mount Lemmon	Mount Lemmon Survey	·	780 m	MPC · JPL
277988	2006 UG_{7}	—	October 16, 2006	Catalina	CSS	·	1.5 km	MPC · JPL
277989	2006 US_{7}	—	October 16, 2006	Catalina	CSS	·	1.6 km	MPC · JPL
277990	2006 UY_{7}	—	October 16, 2006	Catalina	CSS	·	940 m	MPC · JPL
277991	2006 UO_{15}	—	October 17, 2006	Mount Lemmon	Mount Lemmon Survey	·	4.2 km	MPC · JPL
277992	2006 UE_{16}	—	October 17, 2006	Mount Lemmon	Mount Lemmon Survey	·	800 m	MPC · JPL
277993	2006 UR_{37}	—	October 16, 2006	Kitt Peak	Spacewatch	·	770 m	MPC · JPL
277994	2006 UN_{53}	—	October 17, 2006	Mount Lemmon	Mount Lemmon Survey	·	950 m	MPC · JPL
277995	2006 UG_{55}	—	October 17, 2006	Kitt Peak	Spacewatch	·	1.7 km	MPC · JPL
277996	2006 UR_{74}	—	October 17, 2006	Kitt Peak	Spacewatch	·	1.2 km	MPC · JPL
277997	2006 UT_{78}	—	October 17, 2006	Kitt Peak	Spacewatch	·	900 m	MPC · JPL
277998	2006 UE_{85}	—	January 13, 2004	Kitt Peak	Spacewatch	·	620 m	MPC · JPL
277999	2006 UY_{86}	—	October 17, 2006	Mount Lemmon	Mount Lemmon Survey	·	930 m	MPC · JPL
278000	2006 UK_{88}	—	October 17, 2006	Kitt Peak	Spacewatch	·	650 m	MPC · JPL

back to top

== See also ==
- Meanings of minor-planet names: 277001–278000
