= Amy Walsh =

Amy Walsh may refer to:

- Amy Walsh (soccer), Canadian soccer player
- Amy Walsh (actress), English actress
- Amy L. Walsh, spacecraft engineer
