= List of minor planets: 275001–276000 =

The following is a partial list of minor planets, running from minor-planet number 275001 through 276000, inclusive. The primary data for this and other partial lists is based on JPL's "Small-Body Orbital Elements" and data available from the Minor Planet Center. Critical list information is also provided by the MPC, unless otherwise specified from Lowell Observatory. A detailed description of the table's columns and additional sources are given on the main page including a complete list of every page in this series, and a statistical break-up on the dynamical classification of minor planets.

Also see the summary list of all named bodies in numerical and alphabetical order, and the corresponding naming citations for the number range of this particular list. New namings may only be added to this list after official publication, as the preannouncement of names is condemned by the Working Group for Small Bodies Nomenclature of the International Astronomical Union.

Near-Earth obj.	MBA (inner)	MBA (outer)	Centaur
Mars-crosser	MBA (middle)	Jupiter trojan	Trans-Neptunian obj.
Unclassified

== 275001–275100 ==
Designation			Discovery			Properties		Ref
Permanent	Provisional	Named after	Date	Site	Discoverer(s)	Category	Diam.	Ref
275001	2009 TZ_{29}	—	October 15, 2009	Catalina	CSS	·	4.7 km	MPC · JPL
275002	2009 TK_{34}	—	October 11, 2009	La Sagra	OAM	·	2.1 km	MPC · JPL
275003	2009 TB_{36}	—	October 14, 2009	Catalina	CSS	·	700 m	MPC · JPL
275004	2009 TJ_{36}	—	October 14, 2009	Catalina	CSS	NYS	1.3 km	MPC · JPL
275005	2009 TO_{38}	—	October 15, 2009	Catalina	CSS	·	4.9 km	MPC · JPL
275006	2009 TM_{39}	—	October 15, 2009	La Sagra	OAM	L4	14 km	MPC · JPL
275007	2009 TW_{40}	—	October 13, 2009	Bergisch Gladbach	W. Bickel	L4	11 km	MPC · JPL
275008	2009 TY_{46}	—	October 14, 2009	Catalina	CSS	·	2.4 km	MPC · JPL
275009	2009 UC_{3}	—	October 17, 2009	Črni Vrh	Mikuž, H.	·	1.9 km	MPC · JPL
275010	2009 UO_{4}	—	October 18, 2009	Bisei SG Center	BATTeRS	·	1.9 km	MPC · JPL
275011	2009 US_{4}	—	October 17, 2009	Bisei SG Center	BATTeRS	·	2.1 km	MPC · JPL
275012	2009 UC_{7}	—	December 2, 1994	Kitt Peak	Spacewatch	3:2 · SHU	5.9 km	MPC · JPL
275013	2009 UM_{7}	—	October 16, 2009	Mount Lemmon	Mount Lemmon Survey	AST	1.8 km	MPC · JPL
275014	2009 UW_{11}	—	October 16, 2009	Catalina	CSS	EOS	3.1 km	MPC · JPL
275015	2009 UN_{12}	—	October 17, 2009	Kitt Peak	Spacewatch	HYG	3.4 km	MPC · JPL
275016	2009 UV_{15}	—	October 17, 2009	La Sagra	OAM	·	3.2 km	MPC · JPL
275017	2009 UY_{22}	—	October 17, 2009	Mount Lemmon	Mount Lemmon Survey	·	3.0 km	MPC · JPL
275018	2009 UF_{26}	—	October 21, 2009	Mount Lemmon	Mount Lemmon Survey	·	940 m	MPC · JPL
275019	2009 UK_{26}	—	October 21, 2009	Catalina	CSS	·	5.1 km	MPC · JPL
275020	2009 UN_{26}	—	October 21, 2009	Catalina	CSS	NYS	1.2 km	MPC · JPL
275021	2009 UO_{28}	—	October 18, 2009	Mount Lemmon	Mount Lemmon Survey	·	4.5 km	MPC · JPL
275022	2009 UZ_{28}	—	October 18, 2009	Mount Lemmon	Mount Lemmon Survey	TIR	2.2 km	MPC · JPL
275023	2009 UQ_{29}	—	October 18, 2009	Mount Lemmon	Mount Lemmon Survey	THM	2.3 km	MPC · JPL
275024	2009 UJ_{30}	—	October 18, 2009	Mount Lemmon	Mount Lemmon Survey	MAS	860 m	MPC · JPL
275025	2009 UY_{31}	—	October 18, 2009	Mount Lemmon	Mount Lemmon Survey	·	1.8 km	MPC · JPL
275026	2009 UZ_{32}	—	October 18, 2009	Mount Lemmon	Mount Lemmon Survey	·	1.8 km	MPC · JPL
275027	2009 UB_{35}	—	October 21, 2009	Mount Lemmon	Mount Lemmon Survey	·	1.3 km	MPC · JPL
275028	2009 UN_{35}	—	October 21, 2009	Mount Lemmon	Mount Lemmon Survey	·	2.6 km	MPC · JPL
275029	2009 UB_{37}	—	November 21, 2004	Campo Imperatore	CINEOS	·	4.2 km	MPC · JPL
275030	2009 UG_{37}	—	October 22, 2009	Mount Lemmon	Mount Lemmon Survey	·	1.6 km	MPC · JPL
275031	2009 UL_{37}	—	October 22, 2009	Mount Lemmon	Mount Lemmon Survey	3:2	6.8 km	MPC · JPL
275032	2009 UE_{44}	—	October 18, 2009	Mount Lemmon	Mount Lemmon Survey	·	2.8 km	MPC · JPL
275033	2009 UK_{45}	—	October 18, 2009	Mount Lemmon	Mount Lemmon Survey	AST	1.7 km	MPC · JPL
275034	2009 UH_{46}	—	October 18, 2009	Mount Lemmon	Mount Lemmon Survey	V	800 m	MPC · JPL
275035	2009 UT_{46}	—	August 22, 2004	Kitt Peak	Spacewatch	·	1.7 km	MPC · JPL
275036	2009 UY_{46}	—	October 18, 2009	Mount Lemmon	Mount Lemmon Survey	·	2.6 km	MPC · JPL
275037	2009 US_{50}	—	December 25, 2005	Kitt Peak	Spacewatch	KOR	1.3 km	MPC · JPL
275038	2009 UO_{54}	—	October 27, 2005	Kitt Peak	Spacewatch	·	1.8 km	MPC · JPL
275039	2009 UW_{58}	—	October 23, 2009	Mount Lemmon	Mount Lemmon Survey	·	1.6 km	MPC · JPL
275040	2009 UL_{65}	—	October 17, 2009	Mount Lemmon	Mount Lemmon Survey	AGN	1.4 km	MPC · JPL
275041	2009 UO_{67}	—	October 17, 2009	Mount Lemmon	Mount Lemmon Survey	·	2.3 km	MPC · JPL
275042	2009 UL_{68}	—	October 17, 2009	Mount Lemmon	Mount Lemmon Survey	HNS	1.5 km	MPC · JPL
275043	2009 UH_{71}	—	October 22, 2009	Mount Lemmon	Mount Lemmon Survey	·	780 m	MPC · JPL
275044	2009 UK_{71}	—	October 22, 2009	Catalina	CSS	V	800 m	MPC · JPL
275045	2009 UC_{76}	—	October 21, 2009	Mount Lemmon	Mount Lemmon Survey	·	2.1 km	MPC · JPL
275046	2009 UZ_{80}	—	October 22, 2009	Catalina	CSS	MRX	1.4 km	MPC · JPL
275047	2009 UZ_{83}	—	October 23, 2009	Mount Lemmon	Mount Lemmon Survey	·	2.5 km	MPC · JPL
275048	2009 UA_{87}	—	October 24, 2009	Catalina	CSS	·	1.4 km	MPC · JPL
275049	2009 UA_{90}	—	October 18, 2009	Mount Lemmon	Mount Lemmon Survey	·	1.0 km	MPC · JPL
275050	2009 UO_{91}	—	October 18, 2009	Catalina	CSS	·	2.0 km	MPC · JPL
275051	2009 UA_{93}	—	October 25, 2009	Tiki	Teamo, N.	EOS	2.0 km	MPC · JPL
275052	2009 UJ_{99}	—	October 23, 2009	Mount Lemmon	Mount Lemmon Survey	·	1.8 km	MPC · JPL
275053	2009 UY_{100}	—	October 23, 2009	Mount Lemmon	Mount Lemmon Survey	·	680 m	MPC · JPL
275054	2009 UH_{107}	—	October 22, 2009	Mount Lemmon	Mount Lemmon Survey	·	1.9 km	MPC · JPL
275055	2009 UN_{108}	—	October 23, 2009	Kitt Peak	Spacewatch	·	2.4 km	MPC · JPL
275056	2009 UX_{108}	—	October 23, 2009	Mount Lemmon	Mount Lemmon Survey	(5)	1.6 km	MPC · JPL
275057	2009 UG_{109}	—	October 23, 2009	Mount Lemmon	Mount Lemmon Survey	·	3.6 km	MPC · JPL
275058	2009 US_{110}	—	October 23, 2009	Kitt Peak	Spacewatch	KOR	1.4 km	MPC · JPL
275059	2009 UD_{117}	—	October 22, 2009	Mount Lemmon	Mount Lemmon Survey	L4	11 km	MPC · JPL
275060	2009 UX_{117}	—	October 22, 2009	Catalina	CSS	·	3.2 km	MPC · JPL
275061	2009 UA_{118}	—	October 22, 2009	Catalina	CSS	·	2.0 km	MPC · JPL
275062	2009 UY_{119}	—	October 23, 2009	Mount Lemmon	Mount Lemmon Survey	·	850 m	MPC · JPL
275063	2009 UX_{120}	—	October 23, 2009	Mount Lemmon	Mount Lemmon Survey	·	2.2 km	MPC · JPL
275064	2009 US_{121}	—	October 25, 2009	Catalina	CSS	·	3.0 km	MPC · JPL
275065	2009 UZ_{128}	—	October 29, 2009	Bisei SG Center	BATTeRS	·	1.3 km	MPC · JPL
275066	2009 UZ_{129}	—	October 27, 2009	La Sagra	OAM	(194)	2.1 km	MPC · JPL
275067	2009 UZ_{130}	—	October 29, 2009	Catalina	CSS	·	3.8 km	MPC · JPL
275068	2009 UL_{134}	—	October 23, 2009	Kitt Peak	Spacewatch	AGN	1.3 km	MPC · JPL
275069	2009 UR_{134}	—	October 23, 2009	Mount Lemmon	Mount Lemmon Survey	·	2.5 km	MPC · JPL
275070	2009 US_{136}	—	October 24, 2009	Catalina	CSS	·	4.3 km	MPC · JPL
275071	2009 UZ_{137}	—	October 24, 2009	Catalina	CSS	·	2.1 km	MPC · JPL
275072	2009 UB_{138}	—	October 26, 2009	Kitt Peak	Spacewatch	·	3.6 km	MPC · JPL
275073	2009 UX_{139}	—	October 29, 2009	Catalina	CSS	·	1.9 km	MPC · JPL
275074	2009 UK_{140}	—	October 21, 2009	Mount Lemmon	Mount Lemmon Survey	·	1.2 km	MPC · JPL
275075	2009 UZ_{140}	—	October 27, 2009	Mount Lemmon	Mount Lemmon Survey	·	4.2 km	MPC · JPL
275076	2009 UT_{141}	—	October 24, 2009	Kitt Peak	Spacewatch	·	1.2 km	MPC · JPL
275077	2009 UM_{145}	—	October 17, 2009	La Sagra	OAM	·	1.7 km	MPC · JPL
275078	2009 UU_{145}	—	October 23, 2009	Catalina	CSS	·	6.0 km	MPC · JPL
275079	2009 UW_{147}	—	October 18, 2009	Mount Lemmon	Mount Lemmon Survey	·	1.1 km	MPC · JPL
275080	2009 UN_{148}	—	March 29, 2004	Kitt Peak	Spacewatch	3:2	4.5 km	MPC · JPL
275081	2009 UN_{149}	—	October 26, 2009	Kitt Peak	Spacewatch	V	950 m	MPC · JPL
275082	2009 UW_{151}	—	October 16, 2009	Socorro	LINEAR	·	3.9 km	MPC · JPL
275083	2009 UA_{152}	—	October 19, 2009	Socorro	LINEAR	PHO	2.3 km	MPC · JPL
275084	2009 UN_{152}	—	October 26, 2009	Mount Lemmon	Mount Lemmon Survey	V	660 m	MPC · JPL
275085	2009 UJ_{154}	—	October 18, 2009	Mount Lemmon	Mount Lemmon Survey	NYS	820 m	MPC · JPL
275086	2009 UN_{154}	—	October 18, 2009	Mount Lemmon	Mount Lemmon Survey	·	3.2 km	MPC · JPL
275087	2009 VA_{7}	—	November 8, 2009	Catalina	CSS	MAR	1.7 km	MPC · JPL
275088	2009 VA_{8}	—	November 8, 2009	Catalina	CSS	·	900 m	MPC · JPL
275089	2009 VU_{8}	—	November 8, 2009	Mount Lemmon	Mount Lemmon Survey	·	2.3 km	MPC · JPL
275090	2009 VG_{9}	—	November 8, 2009	Mount Lemmon	Mount Lemmon Survey	·	790 m	MPC · JPL
275091	2009 VO_{16}	—	November 8, 2009	Mount Lemmon	Mount Lemmon Survey	·	1.3 km	MPC · JPL
275092	2009 VD_{20}	—	September 1, 2005	Kitt Peak	Spacewatch	·	1.6 km	MPC · JPL
275093	2009 VG_{20}	—	November 9, 2009	Mount Lemmon	Mount Lemmon Survey	·	3.1 km	MPC · JPL
275094	2009 VH_{21}	—	November 9, 2009	Mount Lemmon	Mount Lemmon Survey	·	1.6 km	MPC · JPL
275095	2009 VE_{23}	—	November 9, 2009	Mount Lemmon	Mount Lemmon Survey	·	1.8 km	MPC · JPL
275096	2009 VN_{27}	—	November 8, 2009	Kitt Peak	Spacewatch	NEM	2.3 km	MPC · JPL
275097	2009 VY_{28}	—	November 8, 2009	Catalina	CSS	·	1.0 km	MPC · JPL
275098	2009 VJ_{29}	—	November 9, 2009	Kitt Peak	Spacewatch	·	1.1 km	MPC · JPL
275099	2009 VA_{30}	—	November 9, 2009	Kitt Peak	Spacewatch	·	1.8 km	MPC · JPL
275100	2009 VZ_{30}	—	November 9, 2009	Mount Lemmon	Mount Lemmon Survey	ADE	2.5 km	MPC · JPL

== 275101–275200 ==
back to top

Designation			Discovery			Properties		Ref
Permanent	Provisional	Named after	Date	Site	Discoverer(s)	Category	Diam.	Ref
275101	2009 VB_{39}	—	November 9, 2009	Mount Lemmon	Mount Lemmon Survey	·	2.0 km	MPC · JPL
275102	2009 VF_{41}	—	November 9, 2009	Catalina	CSS	·	980 m	MPC · JPL
275103	2009 VK_{41}	—	November 9, 2009	Catalina	CSS	·	2.8 km	MPC · JPL
275104	2009 VF_{42}	—	November 11, 2009	Mayhill	Mayhill	·	4.8 km	MPC · JPL
275105	2009 VM_{42}	—	November 14, 2009	Nazaret	Muler, G.	·	3.9 km	MPC · JPL
275106 Sarahdubeyjames	2009 VP_{42}	Sarahdubeyjames	November 14, 2009	Mayhill	Falla, N.	·	3.0 km	MPC · JPL
275107	2009 VN_{43}	—	November 9, 2009	Kitt Peak	Spacewatch	·	1.7 km	MPC · JPL
275108	2009 VO_{43}	—	November 9, 2009	Catalina	CSS	·	1.8 km	MPC · JPL
275109	2009 VM_{44}	—	November 14, 2009	Mayhill	Lowe, A.	·	900 m	MPC · JPL
275110	2009 VE_{45}	—	November 11, 2009	Socorro	LINEAR	·	1.2 km	MPC · JPL
275111	2009 VN_{45}	—	November 15, 2009	Kachina	Hobart, J.	·	1.0 km	MPC · JPL
275112	2009 VP_{47}	—	November 9, 2009	Mount Lemmon	Mount Lemmon Survey	·	1.5 km	MPC · JPL
275113	2009 VZ_{48}	—	November 11, 2009	Kitt Peak	Spacewatch	·	1.1 km	MPC · JPL
275114	2009 VF_{49}	—	November 11, 2009	Kitt Peak	Spacewatch	V	730 m	MPC · JPL
275115	2009 VC_{55}	—	November 11, 2009	Kitt Peak	Spacewatch	KOR	1.4 km	MPC · JPL
275116	2009 VD_{57}	—	November 11, 2009	La Sagra	OAM	L4 · ERY	14 km	MPC · JPL
275117	2009 VE_{57}	—	November 11, 2009	La Sagra	OAM	·	1.8 km	MPC · JPL
275118	2009 VV_{57}	—	November 12, 2009	La Sagra	OAM	·	4.3 km	MPC · JPL
275119	2009 VC_{58}	—	November 15, 2009	Catalina	CSS	NYS	1.5 km	MPC · JPL
275120	2009 VG_{59}	—	November 8, 2009	Catalina	CSS	EOS	3.5 km	MPC · JPL
275121	2009 VC_{60}	—	November 9, 2009	Catalina	CSS	·	4.3 km	MPC · JPL
275122	2009 VN_{60}	—	November 11, 2009	Catalina	CSS	(194)	3.7 km	MPC · JPL
275123	2009 VX_{62}	—	November 8, 2009	Kitt Peak	Spacewatch	·	1.6 km	MPC · JPL
275124	2009 VO_{63}	—	November 8, 2009	Kitt Peak	Spacewatch	·	1.3 km	MPC · JPL
275125	2009 VR_{64}	—	November 9, 2009	Catalina	CSS	·	1.8 km	MPC · JPL
275126	2009 VB_{66}	—	November 9, 2009	Kitt Peak	Spacewatch	·	1.7 km	MPC · JPL
275127	2009 VN_{66}	—	November 9, 2009	Kitt Peak	Spacewatch	·	2.3 km	MPC · JPL
275128	2009 VV_{66}	—	November 9, 2009	Kitt Peak	Spacewatch	·	3.4 km	MPC · JPL
275129	2009 VA_{67}	—	November 9, 2009	Kitt Peak	Spacewatch	·	2.2 km	MPC · JPL
275130	2009 VF_{67}	—	November 9, 2009	Kitt Peak	Spacewatch	·	2.9 km	MPC · JPL
275131	2009 VO_{67}	—	November 9, 2009	Kitt Peak	Spacewatch	·	1.7 km	MPC · JPL
275132	2009 VC_{68}	—	November 9, 2009	Kitt Peak	Spacewatch	·	2.6 km	MPC · JPL
275133	2009 VJ_{69}	—	November 9, 2009	Kitt Peak	Spacewatch	·	3.2 km	MPC · JPL
275134	2009 VX_{69}	—	November 9, 2009	Mount Lemmon	Mount Lemmon Survey	·	2.3 km	MPC · JPL
275135	2009 VC_{71}	—	November 9, 2009	Mount Lemmon	Mount Lemmon Survey	·	4.8 km	MPC · JPL
275136	2009 VY_{71}	—	November 11, 2009	Kitt Peak	Spacewatch	·	1.9 km	MPC · JPL
275137	2009 VP_{72}	—	November 15, 2009	Socorro	LINEAR	L4	12 km	MPC · JPL
275138	2009 VC_{74}	—	September 30, 2005	Mount Lemmon	Mount Lemmon Survey	·	1.3 km	MPC · JPL
275139	2009 VL_{75}	—	November 12, 2009	La Sagra	OAM	·	2.7 km	MPC · JPL
275140	2009 VN_{75}	—	November 13, 2009	La Sagra	OAM	·	2.4 km	MPC · JPL
275141	2009 VL_{76}	—	November 15, 2009	Catalina	CSS	·	2.5 km	MPC · JPL
275142	2009 VZ_{76}	—	November 8, 2009	Catalina	CSS	·	3.4 km	MPC · JPL
275143	2009 VS_{77}	—	November 9, 2009	Catalina	CSS	·	3.2 km	MPC · JPL
275144	2009 VP_{78}	—	November 9, 2009	Catalina	CSS	EUN	1.5 km	MPC · JPL
275145	2009 VK_{80}	—	November 11, 2009	Catalina	CSS	JUN	1.3 km	MPC · JPL
275146	2009 VG_{81}	—	November 15, 2009	Catalina	CSS	·	3.4 km	MPC · JPL
275147	2009 VN_{84}	—	November 9, 2009	Kitt Peak	Spacewatch	·	970 m	MPC · JPL
275148	2009 VV_{85}	—	November 10, 2009	Kitt Peak	Spacewatch	·	3.9 km	MPC · JPL
275149	2009 VP_{86}	—	November 10, 2009	Kitt Peak	Spacewatch	·	3.9 km	MPC · JPL
275150	2009 VA_{89}	—	November 11, 2009	Kitt Peak	Spacewatch	·	2.3 km	MPC · JPL
275151	2009 VZ_{91}	—	November 9, 2009	Catalina	CSS	·	3.7 km	MPC · JPL
275152	2009 VW_{94}	—	November 9, 2009	Kitt Peak	Spacewatch	·	1.5 km	MPC · JPL
275153	2009 VZ_{94}	—	November 9, 2009	Mount Lemmon	Mount Lemmon Survey	MIS	3.0 km	MPC · JPL
275154	2009 VW_{95}	—	November 8, 2009	Kitt Peak	Spacewatch	·	2.8 km	MPC · JPL
275155	2009 VA_{104}	—	November 9, 2009	Catalina	CSS	·	2.4 km	MPC · JPL
275156	2009 VU_{104}	—	November 9, 2009	Catalina	CSS	·	5.3 km	MPC · JPL
275157	2009 VZ_{110}	—	November 10, 2009	Kitt Peak	Spacewatch	·	3.1 km	MPC · JPL
275158	2009 VD_{111}	—	November 10, 2009	La Sagra	OAM	·	1.4 km	MPC · JPL
275159	2009 VM_{111}	—	November 12, 2009	La Sagra	OAM	·	1.4 km	MPC · JPL
275160	2009 VN_{116}	—	November 15, 2009	Socorro	LINEAR	·	2.0 km	MPC · JPL
275161	2009 WU_{4}	—	November 16, 2009	Mount Lemmon	Mount Lemmon Survey	·	2.0 km	MPC · JPL
275162	2009 WC_{6}	—	November 17, 2009	Socorro	LINEAR	·	2.1 km	MPC · JPL
275163	2009 WG_{9}	—	November 18, 2009	Socorro	LINEAR	·	1.7 km	MPC · JPL
275164	2009 WM_{9}	—	November 18, 2009	Socorro	LINEAR	(5)	1.6 km	MPC · JPL
275165	2009 WM_{10}	—	November 19, 2009	Socorro	LINEAR	·	7.1 km	MPC · JPL
275166	2009 WQ_{10}	—	November 19, 2009	Socorro	LINEAR	·	1.7 km	MPC · JPL
275167	2009 WW_{15}	—	November 16, 2009	Mount Lemmon	Mount Lemmon Survey	HYG	4.7 km	MPC · JPL
275168	2009 WC_{24}	—	November 18, 2009	Socorro	LINEAR	(5)	1.7 km	MPC · JPL
275169	2009 WW_{29}	—	November 16, 2009	Mount Lemmon	Mount Lemmon Survey	·	1.1 km	MPC · JPL
275170	2009 WM_{31}	—	November 16, 2009	Kitt Peak	Spacewatch	THM	2.5 km	MPC · JPL
275171	2009 WQ_{31}	—	November 16, 2009	Kitt Peak	Spacewatch	·	1.4 km	MPC · JPL
275172	2009 WX_{31}	—	November 16, 2009	Kitt Peak	Spacewatch	HYG	3.1 km	MPC · JPL
275173	2009 WX_{33}	—	November 16, 2009	Kitt Peak	Spacewatch	·	1.6 km	MPC · JPL
275174	2009 WE_{34}	—	November 16, 2009	Kitt Peak	Spacewatch	·	3.7 km	MPC · JPL
275175	2009 WY_{34}	—	November 16, 2009	Mount Lemmon	Mount Lemmon Survey	VER	4.3 km	MPC · JPL
275176	2009 WS_{38}	—	November 17, 2009	Kitt Peak	Spacewatch	MAS	800 m	MPC · JPL
275177	2009 WX_{39}	—	November 17, 2009	Kitt Peak	Spacewatch	·	2.5 km	MPC · JPL
275178	2009 WP_{40}	—	November 17, 2009	Kitt Peak	Spacewatch	KOR	1.3 km	MPC · JPL
275179	2009 WC_{41}	—	November 17, 2009	Kitt Peak	Spacewatch	·	1.2 km	MPC · JPL
275180	2009 WQ_{43}	—	November 17, 2009	Kitt Peak	Spacewatch	·	3.0 km	MPC · JPL
275181	2009 WH_{52}	—	November 17, 2009	Catalina	CSS	·	2.9 km	MPC · JPL
275182	2009 WS_{58}	—	November 16, 2009	Mount Lemmon	Mount Lemmon Survey	·	780 m	MPC · JPL
275183	2009 WP_{62}	—	November 16, 2009	Mount Lemmon	Mount Lemmon Survey	HOF	3.7 km	MPC · JPL
275184	2009 WG_{65}	—	November 17, 2009	Kitt Peak	Spacewatch	·	2.7 km	MPC · JPL
275185	2009 WB_{76}	—	November 18, 2009	Kitt Peak	Spacewatch	·	1.5 km	MPC · JPL
275186	2009 WU_{76}	—	November 18, 2009	Kitt Peak	Spacewatch	·	3.9 km	MPC · JPL
275187	2009 WN_{77}	—	November 18, 2009	Kitt Peak	Spacewatch	·	2.6 km	MPC · JPL
275188	2009 WG_{78}	—	November 18, 2009	Kitt Peak	Spacewatch	·	2.7 km	MPC · JPL
275189	2009 WS_{79}	—	November 18, 2009	Kitt Peak	Spacewatch	AGN	1.3 km	MPC · JPL
275190	2009 WW_{85}	—	November 19, 2009	Kitt Peak	Spacewatch	V	720 m	MPC · JPL
275191	2009 WE_{86}	—	November 19, 2009	Kitt Peak	Spacewatch	·	5.0 km	MPC · JPL
275192	2009 WO_{97}	—	November 20, 2009	Mount Lemmon	Mount Lemmon Survey	·	3.0 km	MPC · JPL
275193	2009 WF_{102}	—	November 22, 2009	Catalina	CSS	PAD	2.8 km	MPC · JPL
275194	2009 WK_{120}	—	November 20, 2009	Kitt Peak	Spacewatch	KOR	1.5 km	MPC · JPL
275195	2009 WE_{126}	—	November 20, 2009	Kitt Peak	Spacewatch	·	5.0 km	MPC · JPL
275196	2009 WP_{133}	—	April 29, 2003	Kitt Peak	Spacewatch	(5)	1.5 km	MPC · JPL
275197	2009 WT_{133}	—	November 22, 2009	Catalina	CSS	·	1 km	MPC · JPL
275198	2009 WY_{134}	—	November 22, 2009	Mount Lemmon	Mount Lemmon Survey	·	3.3 km	MPC · JPL
275199	2009 WM_{140}	—	November 18, 2009	Mount Lemmon	Mount Lemmon Survey	·	1.4 km	MPC · JPL
275200	2009 WV_{152}	—	November 19, 2009	Mount Lemmon	Mount Lemmon Survey	·	4.7 km	MPC · JPL

== 275201–275300 ==
back to top

Designation			Discovery			Properties		Ref
Permanent	Provisional	Named after	Date	Site	Discoverer(s)	Category	Diam.	Ref
275201	2009 WN_{159}	—	November 21, 2009	Kitt Peak	Spacewatch	·	4.6 km	MPC · JPL
275202	2009 WA_{160}	—	November 21, 2009	Kitt Peak	Spacewatch	·	2.1 km	MPC · JPL
275203	2009 WC_{160}	—	November 21, 2009	Kitt Peak	Spacewatch	·	3.0 km	MPC · JPL
275204	2009 WW_{163}	—	October 1, 2005	Kitt Peak	Spacewatch	·	1.5 km	MPC · JPL
275205	2009 WO_{166}	—	November 21, 2009	Mount Lemmon	Mount Lemmon Survey	·	3.5 km	MPC · JPL
275206	2009 WG_{170}	—	November 22, 2009	Kitt Peak	Spacewatch	·	2.8 km	MPC · JPL
275207	2009 WN_{173}	—	November 22, 2009	Kitt Peak	Spacewatch	·	5.3 km	MPC · JPL
275208	2009 WY_{176}	—	November 23, 2009	Catalina	CSS	·	2.2 km	MPC · JPL
275209	2009 WC_{178}	—	November 23, 2009	Mount Lemmon	Mount Lemmon Survey	(159)	2.7 km	MPC · JPL
275210	2009 WP_{178}	—	November 23, 2009	Mount Lemmon	Mount Lemmon Survey	HOF	3.3 km	MPC · JPL
275211	2009 WW_{178}	—	November 23, 2009	Kitt Peak	Spacewatch	·	1.6 km	MPC · JPL
275212	2009 WH_{179}	—	April 16, 2001	Anderson Mesa	LONEOS	·	1 km	MPC · JPL
275213	2009 WA_{180}	—	November 23, 2009	Kitt Peak	Spacewatch	(17392)	1.6 km	MPC · JPL
275214	2009 WY_{183}	—	November 23, 2009	Purple Mountain	PMO NEO Survey Program	MIS	2.0 km	MPC · JPL
275215 Didiermarouani	2009 WL_{184}	Didiermarouani	November 23, 2009	Zelenchukskaya Stn	T. V. Krjačko	MAR	1.5 km	MPC · JPL
275216	2009 WA_{185}	—	November 24, 2009	La Sagra	OAM	·	2.3 km	MPC · JPL
275217	2009 WR_{188}	—	November 24, 2009	Mount Lemmon	Mount Lemmon Survey	·	1.1 km	MPC · JPL
275218	2009 WV_{194}	—	November 24, 2009	Purple Mountain	PMO NEO Survey Program	·	660 m	MPC · JPL
275219	2009 WG_{195}	—	November 25, 2009	La Sagra	OAM	·	1.7 km	MPC · JPL
275220	2009 WB_{196}	—	November 25, 2009	Kitt Peak	Spacewatch	·	1.2 km	MPC · JPL
275221	2009 WN_{196}	—	November 25, 2009	Catalina	CSS	THM	2.6 km	MPC · JPL
275222	2009 WU_{206}	—	February 4, 2005	Kitt Peak	Spacewatch	·	3.0 km	MPC · JPL
275223	2009 WV_{206}	—	November 17, 2009	Kitt Peak	Spacewatch	·	880 m	MPC · JPL
275224	2009 WW_{209}	—	April 30, 2000	Anderson Mesa	LONEOS	·	1.6 km	MPC · JPL
275225 Kotarbinski	2009 WO_{215}	Kotarbinski	November 20, 2009	Andrushivka	Andrushivka	·	1.6 km	MPC · JPL
275226	2009 WQ_{215}	—	November 17, 2009	Catalina	CSS	·	1.7 km	MPC · JPL
275227	2009 WL_{217}	—	November 18, 2009	La Silla	La Silla	·	2.8 km	MPC · JPL
275228	2009 WK_{218}	—	November 17, 2009	La Silla	La Silla	·	3.0 km	MPC · JPL
275229	2009 WT_{224}	—	November 16, 2009	Mount Lemmon	Mount Lemmon Survey	·	1.7 km	MPC · JPL
275230	2009 WL_{236}	—	October 15, 2002	Palomar	NEAT	·	1.1 km	MPC · JPL
275231	2009 WO_{244}	—	September 16, 2003	Kitt Peak	Spacewatch	·	2.2 km	MPC · JPL
275232	2009 WZ_{247}	—	November 16, 2009	Kitt Peak	Spacewatch	·	2.9 km	MPC · JPL
275233	2009 WO_{250}	—	November 23, 2009	Mount Lemmon	Mount Lemmon Survey	·	1.5 km	MPC · JPL
275234	2009 WE_{252}	—	November 25, 2009	Kitt Peak	Spacewatch	·	1.7 km	MPC · JPL
275235	2009 WK_{252}	—	November 25, 2009	Kitt Peak	Spacewatch	KOR	1.7 km	MPC · JPL
275236	2009 WP_{257}	—	November 25, 2009	Kitt Peak	Spacewatch	·	3.9 km	MPC · JPL
275237	2009 WS_{260}	—	November 21, 2009	Kitt Peak	Spacewatch	·	1.5 km	MPC · JPL
275238	2009 WZ_{260}	—	November 20, 2009	Mount Lemmon	Mount Lemmon Survey	·	1.8 km	MPC · JPL
275239	2009 XH	—	December 6, 2009	Pla D'Arguines	R. Ferrando	THM	2.1 km	MPC · JPL
275240	2009 XH_{2}	—	December 11, 2009	Mayhill	Mayhill	EUN	1.5 km	MPC · JPL
275241	2009 XZ_{2}	—	December 8, 2009	La Sagra	OAM	·	1.6 km	MPC · JPL
275242	2009 XH_{3}	—	November 16, 2009	Kitt Peak	Spacewatch	·	3.9 km	MPC · JPL
275243	2009 XW_{3}	—	December 9, 2009	La Sagra	OAM	HOF	3.6 km	MPC · JPL
275244	2009 XZ_{4}	—	December 10, 2009	Mount Lemmon	Mount Lemmon Survey	·	1.6 km	MPC · JPL
275245	2009 XW_{6}	—	December 11, 2009	Dauban	Kugel, F.	3:2 · SHU	5.1 km	MPC · JPL
275246	2009 XD_{7}	—	December 10, 2009	Socorro	LINEAR	·	4.1 km	MPC · JPL
275247	2009 XJ_{11}	—	December 10, 2009	Mount Lemmon	Mount Lemmon Survey	·	3.2 km	MPC · JPL
275248	2009 XM_{11}	—	December 10, 2009	La Sagra	OAM	·	3.2 km	MPC · JPL
275249	2009 XE_{16}	—	December 15, 2009	Mount Lemmon	Mount Lemmon Survey	·	3.1 km	MPC · JPL
275250	2009 XN_{16}	—	December 15, 2009	Mount Lemmon	Mount Lemmon Survey	·	3.0 km	MPC · JPL
275251	2009 XF_{17}	—	December 15, 2009	Mount Lemmon	Mount Lemmon Survey	·	2.5 km	MPC · JPL
275252	2009 XM_{20}	—	December 9, 2009	La Sagra	OAM	·	2.5 km	MPC · JPL
275253	2009 XC_{22}	—	December 9, 2009	La Sagra	OAM	·	3.8 km	MPC · JPL
275254	2009 XV_{22}	—	April 21, 2006	Kitt Peak	Spacewatch	·	4.2 km	MPC · JPL
275255	2009 XB_{25}	—	December 15, 2009	Mount Lemmon	Mount Lemmon Survey	·	1.8 km	MPC · JPL
275256	2009 YS_{1}	—	December 17, 2009	Mount Lemmon	Mount Lemmon Survey	KOR ·	3.2 km	MPC · JPL
275257	2009 YC_{6}	—	December 17, 2009	Mount Lemmon	Mount Lemmon Survey	HOF	3.2 km	MPC · JPL
275258	2009 YX_{9}	—	December 17, 2009	Mount Lemmon	Mount Lemmon Survey	EOS	3.7 km	MPC · JPL
275259	2009 YP_{11}	—	December 18, 2009	Mount Lemmon	Mount Lemmon Survey	EOS	2.9 km	MPC · JPL
275260	2009 YV_{14}	—	December 18, 2009	Mount Lemmon	Mount Lemmon Survey	·	4.3 km	MPC · JPL
275261	2009 YD_{19}	—	December 26, 2009	Kitt Peak	Spacewatch	VER	6.3 km	MPC · JPL
275262	2009 YA_{24}	—	December 16, 2009	Socorro	LINEAR	·	4.3 km	MPC · JPL
275263	2010 AW_{1}	—	January 6, 2010	Socorro	LINEAR	·	3.7 km	MPC · JPL
275264 Krisztike	2010 AB_{4}	Krisztike	January 9, 2010	Mayhill	Kurti, S.	VER	3.8 km	MPC · JPL
275265	2010 AY_{4}	—	January 4, 2010	Kitt Peak	Spacewatch	·	4.2 km	MPC · JPL
275266	2010 AR_{11}	—	January 6, 2010	Kitt Peak	Spacewatch	·	4.2 km	MPC · JPL
275267	2010 AR_{17}	—	January 7, 2010	Mount Lemmon	Mount Lemmon Survey	·	2.7 km	MPC · JPL
275268	2010 AM_{18}	—	January 7, 2010	Mount Lemmon	Mount Lemmon Survey	THM	3.0 km	MPC · JPL
275269	2010 AR_{27}	—	January 6, 2010	Mount Lemmon	Mount Lemmon Survey	·	1.9 km	MPC · JPL
275270	2010 AW_{35}	—	January 7, 2010	Kitt Peak	Spacewatch	·	4.3 km	MPC · JPL
275271	2010 AJ_{40}	—	January 12, 2010	Mayhill	Lowe, A.	VER	4.1 km	MPC · JPL
275272	2010 AD_{41}	—	January 6, 2010	Kitt Peak	Spacewatch	·	5.8 km	MPC · JPL
275273	2010 AZ_{44}	—	January 7, 2010	Mount Lemmon	Mount Lemmon Survey	·	3.0 km	MPC · JPL
275274	2010 AF_{46}	—	January 7, 2010	Mount Lemmon	Mount Lemmon Survey	V	830 m	MPC · JPL
275275	2010 AJ_{58}	—	January 11, 2010	Kitt Peak	Spacewatch	·	4.3 km	MPC · JPL
275276	2010 AN_{65}	—	January 11, 2010	Kitt Peak	Spacewatch	·	3.9 km	MPC · JPL
275277	2010 AT_{89}	—	January 8, 2010	WISE	WISE	·	1.6 km	MPC · JPL
275278	2010 AV_{93}	—	April 7, 2003	Kitt Peak	Spacewatch	L4	16 km	MPC · JPL
275279	2010 AM_{107}	—	December 31, 2000	Haleakala	NEAT	L4	14 km	MPC · JPL
275280	2010 AF_{117}	—	December 15, 1999	Kitt Peak	Spacewatch	·	5.4 km	MPC · JPL
275281 Amywalsh	2010 AE_{129}	Amywalsh	January 14, 2010	WISE	WISE	·	1.9 km	MPC · JPL
275282	2010 BJ_{1}	—	January 17, 2010	Dauban	Kugel, F.	·	3.7 km	MPC · JPL
275283	2010 BX_{70}	—	June 20, 2002	Palomar	NEAT	·	5.1 km	MPC · JPL
275284	2010 BX_{130}	—	October 18, 2003	Kitt Peak	Spacewatch	·	3.9 km	MPC · JPL
275285	2010 CF_{49}	—	March 26, 2006	Kitt Peak	Spacewatch	HYG	4.0 km	MPC · JPL
275286	2010 CZ_{70}	—	February 13, 2010	Mount Lemmon	Mount Lemmon Survey	·	5.0 km	MPC · JPL
275287	2010 CV_{142}	—	February 9, 2010	Kitt Peak	Spacewatch	·	2.6 km	MPC · JPL
275288	2010 CV_{162}	—	February 9, 2010	Mount Lemmon	Mount Lemmon Survey	3:2	7.3 km	MPC · JPL
275289	2010 CC_{179}	—	February 5, 2010	Catalina	CSS	·	3.1 km	MPC · JPL
275290	2010 EW_{6}	—	March 3, 2010	WISE	WISE	·	4.1 km	MPC · JPL
275291	2010 FS_{87}	—	October 16, 2003	Kitt Peak	Spacewatch	·	1.8 km	MPC · JPL
275292	2010 LX_{80}	—	July 29, 2000	Anderson Mesa	LONEOS	·	1.1 km	MPC · JPL
275293	2010 LN_{85}	—	May 1, 2006	Kitt Peak	Spacewatch	·	2.6 km	MPC · JPL
275294	2010 NF_{18}	—	October 1, 2000	Socorro	LINEAR	·	1.2 km	MPC · JPL
275295	2010 NX_{101}	—	July 12, 2010	WISE	WISE	·	2.3 km	MPC · JPL
275296	2010 OY_{4}	—	July 16, 2010	WISE	WISE	·	2.6 km	MPC · JPL
275297	2010 OQ_{52}	—	July 3, 2005	Palomar	NEAT	·	3.1 km	MPC · JPL
275298	2010 ON_{62}	—	October 21, 2001	Kitt Peak	Spacewatch	·	3.0 km	MPC · JPL
275299	2010 OH_{111}	—	October 31, 2005	Mauna Kea	A. Boattini	3:2	6.3 km	MPC · JPL
275300	2010 OH_{118}	—	March 26, 2003	Kitt Peak	Spacewatch	slow	5.1 km	MPC · JPL

== 275301–275400 ==
back to top

Designation			Discovery			Properties		Ref
Permanent	Provisional	Named after	Date	Site	Discoverer(s)	Category	Diam.	Ref
275301	2010 OR_{121}	—	April 4, 2002	Palomar	NEAT	·	5.2 km	MPC · JPL
275302	2010 PM_{12}	—	January 13, 2002	Socorro	LINEAR	·	3.5 km	MPC · JPL
275303	2010 PZ_{27}	—	December 22, 2005	Catalina	CSS	·	5.2 km	MPC · JPL
275304	2010 PN_{33}	—	November 25, 2005	Catalina	CSS	EUP	5.7 km	MPC · JPL
275305	2010 RJ_{103}	—	June 22, 2006	Kitt Peak	Spacewatch	·	1.1 km	MPC · JPL
275306	2010 RF_{166}	—	December 7, 2002	Apache Point	SDSS	·	1.9 km	MPC · JPL
275307	2010 RR_{166}	—	November 7, 2002	Socorro	LINEAR	(5)	1.2 km	MPC · JPL
275308	2010 SS_{18}	—	September 21, 2003	Kitt Peak	Spacewatch	·	710 m	MPC · JPL
275309	2010 SU_{28}	—	October 1, 1999	Catalina	CSS	MAS	900 m	MPC · JPL
275310	2010 TR_{36}	—	February 7, 2006	Kitt Peak	Spacewatch	·	1.0 km	MPC · JPL
275311	2010 TA_{130}	—	August 22, 2001	Socorro	LINEAR	·	1.7 km	MPC · JPL
275312	2010 TE_{142}	—	January 25, 2001	Lime Creek	R. Linderholm	·	4.1 km	MPC · JPL
275313	2010 TY_{162}	—	October 31, 1999	Kitt Peak	Spacewatch	·	3.3 km	MPC · JPL
275314	2010 TE_{168}	—	September 20, 2003	Haleakala	NEAT	·	1.9 km	MPC · JPL
275315	2010 TE_{174}	—	June 8, 2005	Kitt Peak	Spacewatch	·	2.5 km	MPC · JPL
275316	2010 TB_{176}	—	May 15, 2005	Palomar	NEAT	·	1.8 km	MPC · JPL
275317	2010 TA_{179}	—	October 16, 2003	Kitt Peak	Spacewatch	·	880 m	MPC · JPL
275318	2010 UM_{11}	—	March 10, 2002	Haleakala	NEAT	·	4.6 km	MPC · JPL
275319	2010 UZ_{24}	—	April 21, 2004	Kitt Peak	Spacewatch	L4	10 km	MPC · JPL
275320	2010 UY_{36}	—	October 27, 2003	Kitt Peak	Spacewatch	CYB	6.6 km	MPC · JPL
275321	2010 UX_{54}	—	July 18, 2006	Siding Spring	SSS	·	990 m	MPC · JPL
275322	2010 UP_{83}	—	October 16, 1998	Kitt Peak	Spacewatch	L4	9.6 km	MPC · JPL
275323	2010 UW_{94}	—	November 25, 2005	Catalina	CSS	EOS	2.3 km	MPC · JPL
275324	2010 UH_{99}	—	December 27, 2000	Anderson Mesa	LONEOS	L4	12 km	MPC · JPL
275325	2010 VZ_{2}	—	April 13, 2008	Kitt Peak	Spacewatch	ADE	2.0 km	MPC · JPL
275326	2010 VY_{31}	—	September 13, 2004	Kitt Peak	Spacewatch	·	2.4 km	MPC · JPL
275327	2010 VR_{36}	—	January 8, 2007	Kitt Peak	Spacewatch	·	2.4 km	MPC · JPL
275328	2010 VS_{39}	—	February 16, 2004	Kitt Peak	Spacewatch	NYS	1.2 km	MPC · JPL
275329	2010 VG_{63}	—	December 19, 2003	Kitt Peak	Spacewatch	·	1.2 km	MPC · JPL
275330	2010 VT_{67}	—	December 4, 2005	Kitt Peak	Spacewatch	·	4.8 km	MPC · JPL
275331	2010 VK_{129}	—	September 29, 2000	Kitt Peak	Spacewatch	·	730 m	MPC · JPL
275332	2010 VV_{172}	—	November 15, 1998	Kitt Peak	Spacewatch	L4	10 km	MPC · JPL
275333	2010 VT_{192}	—	April 4, 2003	Kitt Peak	Spacewatch	L4	9.7 km	MPC · JPL
275334	2010 VE_{200}	—	February 18, 2008	Mount Lemmon	Mount Lemmon Survey	EUN	1.7 km	MPC · JPL
275335	2010 WB_{2}	—	October 25, 2005	Mount Lemmon	Mount Lemmon Survey	·	1.9 km	MPC · JPL
275336	2010 WF_{10}	—	November 16, 2006	Kitt Peak	Spacewatch	·	1.3 km	MPC · JPL
275337	2010 WL_{29}	—	December 16, 2003	Kitt Peak	Spacewatch	·	1.2 km	MPC · JPL
275338	2010 WU_{55}	—	November 4, 2005	Mount Lemmon	Mount Lemmon Survey	·	3.3 km	MPC · JPL
275339	2010 WA_{73}	—	August 23, 2003	Palomar	NEAT	·	4.8 km	MPC · JPL
275340	2010 XR_{4}	—	September 13, 2005	Kitt Peak	Spacewatch	·	2.1 km	MPC · JPL
275341	2010 XQ_{11}	—	January 19, 2001	Socorro	LINEAR	·	2.1 km	MPC · JPL
275342	2010 XV_{34}	—	August 8, 2008	Črni Vrh	J. Vales, H. Mikuž	L4	15 km	MPC · JPL
275343	2010 XF_{52}	—	January 4, 2001	Kitt Peak	Spacewatch	·	3.9 km	MPC · JPL
275344	2010 XO_{52}	—	October 1, 2005	Kitt Peak	Spacewatch	MAS	1.1 km	MPC · JPL
275345	2010 XX_{55}	—	July 30, 2008	Mount Lemmon	Mount Lemmon Survey	·	2.1 km	MPC · JPL
275346	2010 XJ_{58}	—	December 5, 2002	Kitt Peak	Spacewatch	·	1.8 km	MPC · JPL
275347	2010 XV_{60}	—	January 6, 2006	Catalina	CSS	H	770 m	MPC · JPL
275348	2010 XV_{67}	—	July 22, 1995	Kitt Peak	Spacewatch	·	2.7 km	MPC · JPL
275349	2011 AX	—	March 22, 2001	Kitt Peak	Spacewatch	·	840 m	MPC · JPL
275350	2011 AY	—	January 9, 2007	Mount Lemmon	Mount Lemmon Survey	·	1.7 km	MPC · JPL
275351	2011 AB_{11}	—	October 27, 2005	Mount Lemmon	Mount Lemmon Survey	·	1.6 km	MPC · JPL
275352	2011 AA_{12}	—	January 9, 2006	Mount Lemmon	Mount Lemmon Survey	·	2.5 km	MPC · JPL
275353	2011 AH_{16}	—	February 29, 2000	Socorro	LINEAR	·	4.9 km	MPC · JPL
275354	2011 AL_{28}	—	August 29, 2005	Kitt Peak	Spacewatch	·	1.6 km	MPC · JPL
275355	2011 AQ_{28}	—	January 12, 2004	Nogales	P. R. Holvorcem, M. Schwartz	·	650 m	MPC · JPL
275356	2011 AY_{29}	—	October 9, 1999	Kitt Peak	Spacewatch	·	800 m	MPC · JPL
275357	2011 AN_{30}	—	March 27, 2003	Kitt Peak	Spacewatch	·	1.4 km	MPC · JPL
275358	2011 AP_{30}	—	February 10, 2002	Socorro	LINEAR	HOF	3.4 km	MPC · JPL
275359	2011 AJ_{31}	—	March 25, 2007	Mount Lemmon	Mount Lemmon Survey	EOS	3.0 km	MPC · JPL
275360	2011 AS_{32}	—	October 14, 2001	Kitt Peak	Spacewatch	·	1.2 km	MPC · JPL
275361	2011 AC_{33}	—	December 24, 2006	Kitt Peak	Spacewatch	·	1.1 km	MPC · JPL
275362	2011 AH_{34}	—	February 11, 2002	Socorro	LINEAR	·	2.6 km	MPC · JPL
275363	2011 AU_{35}	—	October 25, 2001	Socorro	LINEAR	(1547)	2.1 km	MPC · JPL
275364	2011 AY_{35}	—	January 10, 2007	Catalina	CSS	PHO	1.0 km	MPC · JPL
275365	2011 AO_{36}	—	January 5, 2002	Kitt Peak	Spacewatch	·	2.5 km	MPC · JPL
275366	2011 AM_{43}	—	February 22, 2004	Kitt Peak	Spacewatch	·	950 m	MPC · JPL
275367	2011 AZ_{43}	—	February 4, 1997	Kitt Peak	Spacewatch	HOF	3.9 km	MPC · JPL
275368	2011 AO_{46}	—	October 2, 2003	Kitt Peak	Spacewatch	·	2.8 km	MPC · JPL
275369	2011 AX_{48}	—	June 17, 2005	Mount Lemmon	Mount Lemmon Survey	·	1.4 km	MPC · JPL
275370	2011 AT_{53}	—	March 2, 1995	Kitt Peak	Spacewatch	·	2.9 km	MPC · JPL
275371	2011 AZ_{54}	—	September 13, 2007	Mount Lemmon	Mount Lemmon Survey	L4	5.8 km	MPC · JPL
275372	2011 AC_{57}	—	November 30, 2003	Kitt Peak	Spacewatch	·	3.3 km	MPC · JPL
275373	2011 AB_{60}	—	January 19, 2004	Kitt Peak	Spacewatch	·	980 m	MPC · JPL
275374	2011 AL_{60}	—	December 13, 2006	Mount Lemmon	Mount Lemmon Survey	·	1.7 km	MPC · JPL
275375	2011 AM_{61}	—	March 20, 2001	Kanab	Sheridan, E.	·	1.2 km	MPC · JPL
275376	2011 AC_{63}	—	April 14, 2004	Kitt Peak	Spacewatch	·	1.1 km	MPC · JPL
275377	2011 AN_{64}	—	November 10, 2004	Kitt Peak	Spacewatch	THM	2.2 km	MPC · JPL
275378	2011 AC_{65}	—	August 20, 2004	Kitt Peak	Spacewatch	AST	1.6 km	MPC · JPL
275379	2011 AQ_{65}	—	February 14, 2002	Kitt Peak	Spacewatch	·	2.1 km	MPC · JPL
275380	2011 AJ_{67}	—	September 30, 2003	Kitt Peak	Spacewatch	·	3.5 km	MPC · JPL
275381	2011 AE_{68}	—	February 1, 2000	Kitt Peak	Spacewatch	MAS	670 m	MPC · JPL
275382	2011 AH_{68}	—	August 29, 2005	Kitt Peak	Spacewatch	(5)	1.2 km	MPC · JPL
275383	2011 AP_{68}	—	December 6, 2005	Kitt Peak	Spacewatch	·	1.9 km	MPC · JPL
275384	2011 AJ_{74}	—	September 19, 2003	Palomar	NEAT	·	3.8 km	MPC · JPL
275385	2011 AV_{74}	—	March 26, 2006	Siding Spring	SSS	·	4.1 km	MPC · JPL
275386	2011 AP_{76}	—	July 21, 2004	Siding Spring	SSS	·	2.7 km	MPC · JPL
275387	2011 AD_{77}	—	March 25, 2003	Kitt Peak	Spacewatch	·	1.6 km	MPC · JPL
275388	2011 AS_{77}	—	December 31, 1999	Kitt Peak	Spacewatch	·	5.0 km	MPC · JPL
275389	2011 BL_{3}	—	April 1, 2003	Palomar	NEAT	·	1.3 km	MPC · JPL
275390	2011 BG_{4}	—	September 24, 2005	Kitt Peak	Spacewatch	·	1.5 km	MPC · JPL
275391	2011 BU_{13}	—	March 4, 2006	Kitt Peak	Spacewatch	·	3.0 km	MPC · JPL
275392	2011 BG_{14}	—	December 18, 2004	Kitt Peak	Spacewatch	·	3.7 km	MPC · JPL
275393	2011 BD_{15}	—	September 19, 2003	Anderson Mesa	LONEOS	·	4.4 km	MPC · JPL
275394	2011 BP_{18}	—	March 21, 1993	La Silla	C.-I. Lagerkvist	HOF	3.7 km	MPC · JPL
275395	2011 BB_{27}	—	March 9, 2003	Anderson Mesa	LONEOS	·	2.1 km	MPC · JPL
275396	2011 BO_{27}	—	March 10, 2000	Kitt Peak	Spacewatch	·	5.4 km	MPC · JPL
275397	2011 BY_{27}	—	August 26, 1998	Kitt Peak	Spacewatch	MAS	840 m	MPC · JPL
275398	2011 BW_{35}	—	January 28, 2000	Kitt Peak	Spacewatch	EOS	1.8 km	MPC · JPL
275399	2011 BR_{39}	—	April 1, 2000	Kitt Peak	Spacewatch	MAS	980 m	MPC · JPL
275400	2011 BV_{39}	—	May 7, 2000	Socorro	LINEAR	·	1.5 km	MPC · JPL

== 275401–275500 ==
back to top

Designation			Discovery			Properties		Ref
Permanent	Provisional	Named after	Date	Site	Discoverer(s)	Category	Diam.	Ref
275401	2011 BN_{40}	—	November 26, 2005	Kitt Peak	Spacewatch	·	2.1 km	MPC · JPL
275402	2011 BR_{40}	—	May 23, 2001	Cerro Tololo	Deep Ecliptic Survey	BAR	1.3 km	MPC · JPL
275403	2011 BW_{40}	—	January 9, 2006	Kitt Peak	Spacewatch	·	2.0 km	MPC · JPL
275404	2011 BG_{43}	—	April 5, 1995	Kitt Peak	Spacewatch	·	3.2 km	MPC · JPL
275405	2011 BH_{46}	—	December 19, 2003	Socorro	LINEAR	·	860 m	MPC · JPL
275406	2011 BR_{48}	—	August 23, 2004	Kitt Peak	Spacewatch	·	1.9 km	MPC · JPL
275407	2011 BK_{51}	—	January 23, 2006	Kitt Peak	Spacewatch	·	2.5 km	MPC · JPL
275408	2011 BP_{53}	—	September 18, 1995	Kitt Peak	Spacewatch	CYB	4.5 km	MPC · JPL
275409	2011 BT_{54}	—	April 21, 1998	Kitt Peak	Spacewatch	·	2.8 km	MPC · JPL
275410	2011 BE_{56}	—	April 13, 1996	Kitt Peak	Spacewatch	·	2.5 km	MPC · JPL
275411	2011 BQ_{59}	—	November 18, 1995	Kitt Peak	Spacewatch	·	2.2 km	MPC · JPL
275412	2011 BU_{62}	—	February 9, 2005	Mount Lemmon	Mount Lemmon Survey	·	5.4 km	MPC · JPL
275413	2011 CD_{1}	—	February 2, 2006	Mount Lemmon	Mount Lemmon Survey	·	4.7 km	MPC · JPL
275414	2011 CL_{2}	—	July 27, 2004	Siding Spring	SSS	·	3.3 km	MPC · JPL
275415	2011 CS_{3}	—	October 10, 2001	Palomar	NEAT	·	1.6 km	MPC · JPL
275416	2011 CJ_{4}	—	October 29, 2005	Kitt Peak	Spacewatch	·	3.0 km	MPC · JPL
275417	2011 CL_{4}	—	September 13, 1998	Kitt Peak	Spacewatch	·	1.5 km	MPC · JPL
275418	2011 CJ_{5}	—	December 29, 2005	Palomar	NEAT	WAT	2.6 km	MPC · JPL
275419	2011 CM_{6}	—	May 6, 2008	Mount Lemmon	Mount Lemmon Survey	·	1.6 km	MPC · JPL
275420	2011 CH_{9}	—	August 26, 2005	Palomar	NEAT	(5)	1.4 km	MPC · JPL
275421	2011 CJ_{9}	—	December 21, 2004	Catalina	CSS	·	4.3 km	MPC · JPL
275422	2011 CZ_{11}	—	February 6, 2000	Kitt Peak	Spacewatch	·	2.2 km	MPC · JPL
275423	2011 CH_{12}	—	February 20, 2006	Kitt Peak	Spacewatch	·	2.3 km	MPC · JPL
275424	2011 CG_{16}	—	October 22, 2003	Apache Point	SDSS	·	5.0 km	MPC · JPL
275425	2011 CV_{16}	—	January 20, 2002	Anderson Mesa	LONEOS	·	2.4 km	MPC · JPL
275426	2011 CT_{18}	—	December 7, 2005	Kitt Peak	Spacewatch	·	2.6 km	MPC · JPL
275427	2011 CD_{19}	—	November 26, 2005	Socorro	LINEAR	EUN	2.4 km	MPC · JPL
275428	2011 CE_{19}	—	February 14, 2005	Catalina	CSS	EUP	4.2 km	MPC · JPL
275429	2011 CY_{21}	—	December 9, 2004	Kitt Peak	Spacewatch	·	4.1 km	MPC · JPL
275430	2011 CA_{22}	—	March 31, 2001	Kitt Peak	Spacewatch	·	2.1 km	MPC · JPL
275431	2011 CN_{22}	—	August 31, 2005	Kitt Peak	Spacewatch	·	1.1 km	MPC · JPL
275432	2011 CS_{24}	—	March 21, 1999	Apache Point	SDSS	ADE	2.3 km	MPC · JPL
275433	2011 CV_{29}	—	November 21, 2003	Kitt Peak	Spacewatch	·	3.4 km	MPC · JPL
275434	2011 CZ_{29}	—	March 13, 2007	Mount Lemmon	Mount Lemmon Survey	·	1.8 km	MPC · JPL
275435	2011 CN_{34}	—	April 26, 2000	Kitt Peak	Spacewatch	·	1.4 km	MPC · JPL
275436	2011 CJ_{35}	—	February 12, 2000	Apache Point	SDSS	(1298)	3.2 km	MPC · JPL
275437	2011 CO_{43}	—	November 18, 2006	Kitt Peak	Spacewatch	·	880 m	MPC · JPL
275438	2011 CM_{44}	—	September 27, 2003	Kitt Peak	Spacewatch	·	4.4 km	MPC · JPL
275439	2011 CK_{45}	—	March 18, 2001	Socorro	LINEAR	·	790 m	MPC · JPL
275440	2011 CC_{48}	—	May 13, 2007	Mount Lemmon	Mount Lemmon Survey	·	4.2 km	MPC · JPL
275441	2011 CJ_{57}	—	September 17, 2003	Kitt Peak	Spacewatch	·	1.6 km	MPC · JPL
275442	2011 CG_{58}	—	September 23, 2004	Kitt Peak	Spacewatch	·	1.7 km	MPC · JPL
275443	2011 CL_{58}	—	March 3, 2006	Kitt Peak	Spacewatch	·	1.5 km	MPC · JPL
275444	2011 CZ_{58}	—	December 19, 2004	Mount Lemmon	Mount Lemmon Survey	THM	2.9 km	MPC · JPL
275445	2011 CF_{62}	—	January 13, 2002	Kitt Peak	Spacewatch	MRX	1.2 km	MPC · JPL
275446	2011 CW_{62}	—	July 28, 2005	Palomar	NEAT	·	990 m	MPC · JPL
275447	2011 CP_{72}	—	December 18, 2004	Kitt Peak	Spacewatch	·	4.1 km	MPC · JPL
275448	2011 CX_{72}	—	August 28, 2002	Palomar	NEAT	PHO	1.1 km	MPC · JPL
275449	2011 CC_{73}	—	April 24, 2004	Kitt Peak	Spacewatch	MAS	1.1 km	MPC · JPL
275450	2011 CL_{73}	—	October 15, 1998	Kitt Peak	Spacewatch	·	1.4 km	MPC · JPL
275451	2011 CR_{73}	—	March 12, 2007	Catalina	CSS	·	1.7 km	MPC · JPL
275452	2011 CU_{73}	—	September 21, 2009	Mount Lemmon	Mount Lemmon Survey	·	1.7 km	MPC · JPL
275453	2011 CA_{74}	—	February 29, 2000	Socorro	LINEAR	·	4.1 km	MPC · JPL
275454	2011 CG_{74}	—	January 7, 2006	Kitt Peak	Spacewatch	·	2.2 km	MPC · JPL
275455	2011 CH_{74}	—	March 23, 2004	Socorro	LINEAR	·	1.4 km	MPC · JPL
275456	2011 CY_{74}	—	March 25, 2000	Kitt Peak	Spacewatch	NYS	1.4 km	MPC · JPL
275457	2011 CQ_{75}	—	February 28, 2000	Kitt Peak	Spacewatch	·	1.4 km	MPC · JPL
275458	2011 CA_{78}	—	August 26, 2003	Cerro Tololo	Deep Ecliptic Survey	·	1.8 km	MPC · JPL
275459	2011 DN_{1}	—	January 12, 1996	Kitt Peak	Spacewatch	·	1.4 km	MPC · JPL
275460	2011 DC_{2}	—	February 21, 1995	Kitt Peak	Spacewatch	·	4.4 km	MPC · JPL
275461	2011 DC_{3}	—	March 3, 2000	Kitt Peak	Spacewatch	·	2.9 km	MPC · JPL
275462	2011 DH_{3}	—	September 5, 2002	Haleakala	NEAT	·	5.8 km	MPC · JPL
275463	2011 DQ_{3}	—	October 27, 2005	Mount Lemmon	Mount Lemmon Survey	GEF	1.7 km	MPC · JPL
275464	2011 DW_{3}	—	March 14, 2007	Catalina	CSS	·	2.1 km	MPC · JPL
275465	2011 DH_{4}	—	January 18, 2007	Palomar	NEAT	·	1.8 km	MPC · JPL
275466	2011 DL_{4}	—	January 31, 1997	Kitt Peak	Spacewatch	·	2.7 km	MPC · JPL
275467	2011 DJ_{5}	—	August 27, 2002	Palomar Mountain	NEAT	·	4.0 km	MPC · JPL
275468	2011 DX_{8}	—	August 8, 2002	Campo Imperatore	CINEOS	·	3.3 km	MPC · JPL
275469	2011 DK_{12}	—	November 11, 2004	Kitt Peak	Spacewatch	·	2.4 km	MPC · JPL
275470	2011 DQ_{12}	—	October 3, 1997	Kitt Peak	Spacewatch	·	1.8 km	MPC · JPL
275471	2011 DC_{18}	—	February 25, 2000	Kitt Peak	Spacewatch	·	3.5 km	MPC · JPL
275472	2011 DT_{18}	—	December 14, 2001	Kitt Peak	Spacewatch	·	1.5 km	MPC · JPL
275473	2011 DZ_{22}	—	October 9, 2005	Kitt Peak	Spacewatch	·	1.2 km	MPC · JPL
275474	2011 DA_{23}	—	March 3, 2006	Mount Nyukasa	Japan Aerospace Exploration Agency	KOR	1.8 km	MPC · JPL
275475	2011 DQ_{23}	—	September 11, 2002	Palomar	NEAT	·	920 m	MPC · JPL
275476	2011 DM_{24}	—	March 31, 1998	Socorro	LINEAR	·	2.8 km	MPC · JPL
275477	2011 DT_{30}	—	October 12, 1998	Kitt Peak	Spacewatch	·	2.7 km	MPC · JPL
275478	2011 EN_{3}	—	October 8, 1999	Kitt Peak	Spacewatch	·	2.1 km	MPC · JPL
275479	2011 EQ_{14}	—	October 22, 2003	Apache Point	SDSS	·	2.4 km	MPC · JPL
275480	2011 ES_{24}	—	January 30, 2006	Kitt Peak	Spacewatch	·	2.2 km	MPC · JPL
275481	2011 EC_{27}	—	June 17, 2006	Kitt Peak	Spacewatch	·	4.3 km	MPC · JPL
275482	2011 EC_{37}	—	December 10, 2005	Kitt Peak	Spacewatch	KOR	1.5 km	MPC · JPL
275483	2011 EE_{38}	—	May 27, 2000	Socorro	LINEAR	·	1.6 km	MPC · JPL
275484	4325 P-L	—	September 24, 1960	Palomar	C. J. van Houten, I. van Houten-Groeneveld, T. Gehrels	·	5.7 km	MPC · JPL
275485	5074 T-2	—	September 25, 1973	Palomar	C. J. van Houten, I. van Houten-Groeneveld, T. Gehrels	·	2.1 km	MPC · JPL
275486	2405 T-3	—	October 16, 1977	Palomar	C. J. van Houten, I. van Houten-Groeneveld, T. Gehrels	·	1.8 km	MPC · JPL
275487	2413 T-3	—	October 16, 1977	Palomar	C. J. van Houten, I. van Houten-Groeneveld, T. Gehrels	·	1.4 km	MPC · JPL
275488	3212 T-3	—	October 16, 1977	Palomar	C. J. van Houten, I. van Houten-Groeneveld, T. Gehrels	EOS	2.5 km	MPC · JPL
275489	4518 T-3	—	October 16, 1977	Palomar	C. J. van Houten, I. van Houten-Groeneveld, T. Gehrels	·	1.6 km	MPC · JPL
275490	5088 T-3	—	October 16, 1977	Palomar	C. J. van Houten, I. van Houten-Groeneveld, T. Gehrels	·	3.2 km	MPC · JPL
275491	1960 SR	—	September 24, 1960	Palomar	L. D. Schmadel, Stoss, R.	·	1.6 km	MPC · JPL
275492	1991 TW_{16}	—	October 6, 1991	Palomar	Lowe, A.	·	1.3 km	MPC · JPL
275493	1992 SY_{11}	—	September 28, 1992	Kitt Peak	Spacewatch	·	3.1 km	MPC · JPL
275494	1993 PA	—	August 10, 1993	Stroncone	A. Vagnozzi	·	1.4 km	MPC · JPL
275495	1994 AD_{15}	—	January 14, 1994	Kitt Peak	Spacewatch	·	1.1 km	MPC · JPL
275496	1994 GH_{7}	—	April 11, 1994	Kitt Peak	Spacewatch	·	1.8 km	MPC · JPL
275497	1994 UA_{11}	—	October 29, 1994	Kitt Peak	Spacewatch	·	1.2 km	MPC · JPL
275498	1994 XV_{2}	—	December 1, 1994	Kitt Peak	Spacewatch	KOR	1.7 km	MPC · JPL
275499	1995 KG_{4}	—	May 26, 1995	Kitt Peak	Spacewatch	H	650 m	MPC · JPL
275500	1995 OA_{9}	—	July 27, 1995	Kitt Peak	Spacewatch	·	2.4 km	MPC · JPL

== 275501–275600 ==
back to top

Designation			Discovery			Properties		Ref
Permanent	Provisional	Named after	Date	Site	Discoverer(s)	Category	Diam.	Ref
275501	1995 RH_{1}	—	September 2, 1995	Kitt Peak	Spacewatch	BRG	2.5 km	MPC · JPL
275502	1995 SG_{8}	—	September 17, 1995	Kitt Peak	Spacewatch	·	2.2 km	MPC · JPL
275503	1995 SR_{31}	—	September 21, 1995	Kitt Peak	Spacewatch	EUN	1.5 km	MPC · JPL
275504	1995 SE_{35}	—	September 22, 1995	Kitt Peak	Spacewatch	·	810 m	MPC · JPL
275505	1995 SF_{73}	—	September 27, 1995	Kitt Peak	Spacewatch	·	1.5 km	MPC · JPL
275506	1995 SL_{81}	—	September 22, 1995	Kitt Peak	Spacewatch	·	1.8 km	MPC · JPL
275507	1995 UJ_{18}	—	October 18, 1995	Kitt Peak	Spacewatch	·	900 m	MPC · JPL
275508	1995 UR_{81}	—	October 28, 1995	Kitt Peak	Spacewatch	·	1.3 km	MPC · JPL
275509	1995 VN_{2}	—	November 14, 1995	Kitt Peak	Spacewatch	·	2.8 km	MPC · JPL
275510	1995 WB_{33}	—	November 20, 1995	Kitt Peak	Spacewatch	WIT	1.3 km	MPC · JPL
275511	1995 WL_{38}	—	November 23, 1995	Kitt Peak	Spacewatch	·	860 m	MPC · JPL
275512	1995 YX_{5}	—	December 16, 1995	Kitt Peak	Spacewatch	·	2.5 km	MPC · JPL
275513	1996 AD_{5}	—	January 12, 1996	Kitt Peak	Spacewatch	NYS	980 m	MPC · JPL
275514	1996 LU	—	June 12, 1996	Prescott	P. G. Comba	PHO	3.7 km	MPC · JPL
275515	1996 TM	—	October 3, 1996	Prescott	P. G. Comba	·	820 m	MPC · JPL
275516	1996 VB_{10}	—	November 3, 1996	Kitt Peak	Spacewatch	MAR	1.4 km	MPC · JPL
275517	1996 XM_{3}	—	December 1, 1996	Kitt Peak	Spacewatch	·	1.7 km	MPC · JPL
275518	1997 EY_{6}	—	March 3, 1997	Kitt Peak	Spacewatch	·	1.2 km	MPC · JPL
275519	1997 JK_{7}	—	May 6, 1997	Kitt Peak	Spacewatch	·	1.8 km	MPC · JPL
275520	1997 MV_{1}	—	June 27, 1997	Kitt Peak	Spacewatch	·	870 m	MPC · JPL
275521	1997 SU_{28}	—	September 28, 1997	Kitt Peak	Spacewatch	NYS	1.3 km	MPC · JPL
275522	1997 SB_{32}	—	September 30, 1997	Kitt Peak	Spacewatch	·	4.2 km	MPC · JPL
275523	1997 TQ_{8}	—	October 4, 1997	Kitt Peak	Spacewatch	NYS	1.3 km	MPC · JPL
275524	1997 TS_{12}	—	October 2, 1997	Kitt Peak	Spacewatch	·	1.3 km	MPC · JPL
275525	1997 UP_{5}	—	October 21, 1997	Kitt Peak	Spacewatch	·	2.7 km	MPC · JPL
275526	1997 WL_{3}	—	November 22, 1997	Kitt Peak	Spacewatch	URS	5.7 km	MPC · JPL
275527	1997 WT_{28}	—	November 28, 1997	Kitt Peak	Spacewatch	·	3.5 km	MPC · JPL
275528	1998 CM	—	February 3, 1998	Kleť	M. Tichý, Z. Moravec	·	2.8 km	MPC · JPL
275529	1998 DS_{16}	—	February 22, 1998	Kitt Peak	Spacewatch	·	1.6 km	MPC · JPL
275530	1998 FT	—	March 18, 1998	Kitt Peak	Spacewatch	·	840 m	MPC · JPL
275531	1998 HW_{11}	—	April 18, 1998	Kitt Peak	Spacewatch	EUN	1.6 km	MPC · JPL
275532	1998 KN_{5}	—	May 18, 1998	Kitt Peak	Spacewatch	JUN	1.5 km	MPC · JPL
275533	1998 MR_{17}	—	June 26, 1998	Socorro	LINEAR	·	3.2 km	MPC · JPL
275534	1998 QJ_{3}	—	August 17, 1998	Socorro	LINEAR	·	3.0 km	MPC · JPL
275535	1998 QW_{94}	—	August 19, 1998	Socorro	LINEAR	·	1.1 km	MPC · JPL
275536	1998 RV_{3}	—	September 14, 1998	Socorro	LINEAR	·	1.8 km	MPC · JPL
275537	1998 RQ_{15}	—	September 15, 1998	Kitt Peak	Spacewatch	KOR	1.8 km	MPC · JPL
275538	1998 RA_{63}	—	September 14, 1998	Socorro	LINEAR	·	3.0 km	MPC · JPL
275539	1998 SP_{18}	—	September 18, 1998	Kitt Peak	Spacewatch	V	760 m	MPC · JPL
275540	1998 SR_{30}	—	September 19, 1998	Kitt Peak	Spacewatch	KOR	1.6 km	MPC · JPL
275541	1998 SU_{44}	—	September 24, 1998	Kitt Peak	Spacewatch	·	1.3 km	MPC · JPL
275542	1998 SX_{79}	—	September 26, 1998	Socorro	LINEAR	V	830 m	MPC · JPL
275543	1998 SJ_{86}	—	September 26, 1998	Socorro	LINEAR	·	1.7 km	MPC · JPL
275544	1998 SF_{168}	—	September 16, 1998	Anderson Mesa	LONEOS	·	1.4 km	MPC · JPL
275545	1998 UN_{1}	—	October 19, 1998	Socorro	LINEAR	AMO +1km	810 m	MPC · JPL
275546	1998 UP_{2}	—	October 20, 1998	Caussols	ODAS	·	1.5 km	MPC · JPL
275547	1998 VE_{43}	—	November 15, 1998	Kitt Peak	Spacewatch	ERI	1.8 km	MPC · JPL
275548	1998 YA_{16}	—	December 22, 1998	Kitt Peak	Spacewatch	·	2.2 km	MPC · JPL
275549	1999 AS_{26}	—	January 8, 1999	Kitt Peak	Spacewatch	EOS	2.8 km	MPC · JPL
275550	1999 CV_{12}	—	February 14, 1999	Caussols	ODAS	·	1.5 km	MPC · JPL
275551	1999 ED_{10}	—	March 14, 1999	Kitt Peak	Spacewatch	·	4.8 km	MPC · JPL
275552	1999 FH_{65}	—	March 20, 1999	Apache Point	SDSS	TIR	3.1 km	MPC · JPL
275553	1999 FN_{97}	—	March 20, 1999	Apache Point	SDSS	·	4.0 km	MPC · JPL
275554	1999 NU_{38}	—	July 14, 1999	Socorro	LINEAR	·	1.7 km	MPC · JPL
275555	1999 NC_{54}	—	July 12, 1999	Socorro	LINEAR	·	2.3 km	MPC · JPL
275556	1999 RT_{29}	—	September 8, 1999	Socorro	LINEAR	·	2.6 km	MPC · JPL
275557	1999 RE_{30}	—	September 8, 1999	Socorro	LINEAR	·	2.6 km	MPC · JPL
275558	1999 RH_{33}	—	September 5, 1999	Kitt Peak	Spacewatch	AMO	550 m	MPC · JPL
275559	1999 RF_{57}	—	September 7, 1999	Socorro	LINEAR	·	2.0 km	MPC · JPL
275560	1999 RL_{66}	—	September 7, 1999	Socorro	LINEAR	·	2.1 km	MPC · JPL
275561	1999 RD_{139}	—	September 9, 1999	Socorro	LINEAR	·	1.8 km	MPC · JPL
275562	1999 RP_{179}	—	September 9, 1999	Socorro	LINEAR	JUN	1.3 km	MPC · JPL
275563	1999 RT_{185}	—	September 9, 1999	Socorro	LINEAR	·	1.5 km	MPC · JPL
275564	1999 RA_{238}	—	September 8, 1999	Catalina	CSS	JUN	1.6 km	MPC · JPL
275565	1999 SZ_{9}	—	September 27, 1999	Ondřejov	L. Kotková	ADE	2.6 km	MPC · JPL
275566	1999 TL_{7}	—	October 7, 1999	Višnjan	K. Korlević, M. Jurić	·	2.3 km	MPC · JPL
275567	1999 TB_{25}	—	October 2, 1999	Socorro	LINEAR	·	2.5 km	MPC · JPL
275568	1999 TR_{38}	—	October 1, 1999	Catalina	CSS	·	810 m	MPC · JPL
275569	1999 TO_{44}	—	October 3, 1999	Kitt Peak	Spacewatch	MRX	1.2 km	MPC · JPL
275570	1999 TT_{59}	—	October 7, 1999	Kitt Peak	Spacewatch	·	1.9 km	MPC · JPL
275571	1999 TW_{61}	—	October 7, 1999	Kitt Peak	Spacewatch	·	2.9 km	MPC · JPL
275572	1999 TN_{72}	—	October 9, 1999	Kitt Peak	Spacewatch	EUN	2.0 km	MPC · JPL
275573	1999 TT_{75}	—	October 10, 1999	Kitt Peak	Spacewatch	(16286)	2.7 km	MPC · JPL
275574	1999 TN_{84}	—	October 13, 1999	Kitt Peak	Spacewatch	GEF	2.0 km	MPC · JPL
275575	1999 TK_{97}	—	October 2, 1999	Socorro	LINEAR	(5)	2.8 km	MPC · JPL
275576	1999 TT_{162}	—	October 9, 1999	Socorro	LINEAR	·	2.5 km	MPC · JPL
275577	1999 TD_{169}	—	October 10, 1999	Socorro	LINEAR	·	1.6 km	MPC · JPL
275578	1999 TL_{201}	—	October 13, 1999	Socorro	LINEAR	·	2.4 km	MPC · JPL
275579	1999 TQ_{211}	—	October 15, 1999	Socorro	LINEAR	·	4.5 km	MPC · JPL
275580	1999 TS_{224}	—	October 1, 1999	Kitt Peak	Spacewatch	·	760 m	MPC · JPL
275581	1999 TF_{262}	—	October 13, 1999	Socorro	LINEAR	·	1.9 km	MPC · JPL
275582	1999 TH_{284}	—	October 9, 1999	Socorro	LINEAR	·	3.0 km	MPC · JPL
275583	1999 TK_{313}	—	October 9, 1999	Socorro	LINEAR	·	710 m	MPC · JPL
275584	1999 TO_{317}	—	October 12, 1999	Kitt Peak	Spacewatch	·	1.3 km	MPC · JPL
275585	1999 UM_{29}	—	October 31, 1999	Kitt Peak	Spacewatch	·	3.0 km	MPC · JPL
275586	1999 UQ_{37}	—	October 16, 1999	Kitt Peak	Spacewatch	NYS	1.3 km	MPC · JPL
275587	1999 UW_{37}	—	October 16, 1999	Kitt Peak	Spacewatch	·	2.6 km	MPC · JPL
275588	1999 VR_{3}	—	November 1, 1999	Kitt Peak	Spacewatch	·	620 m	MPC · JPL
275589	1999 VE_{20}	—	November 10, 1999	Višnjan	K. Korlević	·	450 m	MPC · JPL
275590	1999 VC_{64}	—	November 4, 1999	Socorro	LINEAR	·	3.2 km	MPC · JPL
275591	1999 VJ_{75}	—	November 5, 1999	Kitt Peak	Spacewatch	·	2.3 km	MPC · JPL
275592	1999 VC_{83}	—	November 1, 1999	Kitt Peak	Spacewatch	·	3.9 km	MPC · JPL
275593	1999 VN_{99}	—	November 9, 1999	Socorro	LINEAR	NYS	1.4 km	MPC · JPL
275594	1999 VU_{102}	—	November 9, 1999	Socorro	LINEAR	·	3.8 km	MPC · JPL
275595	1999 VE_{117}	—	November 6, 1999	Kitt Peak	Spacewatch	·	830 m	MPC · JPL
275596	1999 VN_{129}	—	November 11, 1999	Kitt Peak	Spacewatch	·	4.0 km	MPC · JPL
275597	1999 VQ_{133}	—	November 10, 1999	Kitt Peak	Spacewatch	·	2.3 km	MPC · JPL
275598	1999 VH_{137}	—	November 12, 1999	Socorro	LINEAR	·	1.0 km	MPC · JPL
275599	1999 VC_{148}	—	November 14, 1999	Socorro	LINEAR	·	2.1 km	MPC · JPL
275600	1999 VC_{163}	—	November 14, 1999	Socorro	LINEAR	fast	1.2 km	MPC · JPL

== 275601–275700 ==
back to top

Designation			Discovery			Properties		Ref
Permanent	Provisional	Named after	Date	Site	Discoverer(s)	Category	Diam.	Ref
275601	1999 VA_{174}	—	November 3, 1999	Anderson Mesa	LONEOS	·	3.2 km	MPC · JPL
275602	1999 VJ_{206}	—	November 12, 1999	Socorro	LINEAR	·	1.3 km	MPC · JPL
275603	1999 VW_{211}	—	November 12, 1999	Socorro	LINEAR	·	2.6 km	MPC · JPL
275604	1999 WO_{10}	—	November 28, 1999	Kitt Peak	Spacewatch	·	2.5 km	MPC · JPL
275605	1999 XH_{16}	—	December 7, 1999	Socorro	LINEAR	·	1.3 km	MPC · JPL
275606	1999 XU_{51}	—	December 7, 1999	Socorro	LINEAR	·	2.9 km	MPC · JPL
275607	1999 XG_{79}	—	December 7, 1999	Socorro	LINEAR	·	3.0 km	MPC · JPL
275608	1999 XJ_{146}	—	December 7, 1999	Kitt Peak	Spacewatch	·	700 m	MPC · JPL
275609	1999 XQ_{147}	—	December 7, 1999	Kitt Peak	Spacewatch	·	3.6 km	MPC · JPL
275610	1999 XR_{224}	—	December 13, 1999	Kitt Peak	Spacewatch	(2076)	980 m	MPC · JPL
275611	1999 XX_{262}	—	December 12, 1999	Catalina	CSS	AMO +1km	1.5 km	MPC · JPL
275612	1999 YA_{18}	—	December 30, 1999	Socorro	LINEAR	·	2.7 km	MPC · JPL
275613	2000 AZ_{36}	—	January 3, 2000	Socorro	LINEAR	·	950 m	MPC · JPL
275614	2000 AS_{93}	—	January 6, 2000	Socorro	LINEAR	·	1.7 km	MPC · JPL
275615	2000 AP_{136}	—	January 4, 2000	Socorro	LINEAR	·	1.2 km	MPC · JPL
275616	2000 AH_{216}	—	January 8, 2000	Kitt Peak	Spacewatch	·	2.6 km	MPC · JPL
275617	2000 AB_{226}	—	January 12, 2000	Kitt Peak	Spacewatch	·	1.7 km	MPC · JPL
275618	2000 AU_{242}	—	January 7, 2000	Anderson Mesa	LONEOS	T_{j} (2.74)	7.3 km	MPC · JPL
275619	2000 BS_{40}	—	January 29, 2000	Kitt Peak	Spacewatch	·	2.3 km	MPC · JPL
275620	2000 CP_{79}	—	February 8, 2000	Kitt Peak	Spacewatch	·	3.0 km	MPC · JPL
275621	2000 CK_{106}	—	February 5, 2000	Kitt Peak	M. W. Buie	·	2.6 km	MPC · JPL
275622	2000 CM_{130}	—	February 3, 2000	Kitt Peak	Spacewatch	·	700 m	MPC · JPL
275623	2000 CW_{130}	—	February 2, 2000	Kitt Peak	Spacewatch	PHO	1.4 km	MPC · JPL
275624	2000 DR_{1}	—	February 26, 2000	Kitt Peak	Spacewatch	MAS	820 m	MPC · JPL
275625	2000 DA_{13}	—	February 27, 2000	Kitt Peak	Spacewatch	PHO	1.5 km	MPC · JPL
275626	2000 DC_{17}	—	February 29, 2000	Socorro	LINEAR	·	1.5 km	MPC · JPL
275627	2000 DG_{90}	—	February 27, 2000	Kitt Peak	Spacewatch	·	850 m	MPC · JPL
275628	2000 DZ_{100}	—	February 29, 2000	Socorro	LINEAR	·	2.9 km	MPC · JPL
275629	2000 DF_{101}	—	February 29, 2000	Socorro	LINEAR	·	1.3 km	MPC · JPL
275630	2000 EW_{10}	—	March 4, 2000	Socorro	LINEAR	·	1.2 km	MPC · JPL
275631	2000 EH_{18}	—	March 4, 2000	Socorro	LINEAR	·	3.8 km	MPC · JPL
275632	2000 EG_{20}	—	March 3, 2000	Socorro	LINEAR	H	920 m	MPC · JPL
275633	2000 EZ_{72}	—	March 10, 2000	Kitt Peak	Spacewatch	·	1.4 km	MPC · JPL
275634	2000 EC_{126}	—	March 11, 2000	Anderson Mesa	LONEOS	ERI	2.3 km	MPC · JPL
275635	2000 ET_{152}	—	March 6, 2000	Haleakala	NEAT	NYS	1.4 km	MPC · JPL
275636	2000 EJ_{203}	—	March 5, 2000	Cerro Tololo	Deep Lens Survey	·	2.3 km	MPC · JPL
275637	2000 EF_{208}	—	March 3, 2000	Apache Point	SDSS	·	3.4 km	MPC · JPL
275638	2000 FZ_{8}	—	March 29, 2000	Kitt Peak	Spacewatch	·	1.5 km	MPC · JPL
275639	2000 FC_{45}	—	March 29, 2000	Socorro	LINEAR	·	3.9 km	MPC · JPL
275640	2000 GV_{19}	—	April 5, 2000	Socorro	LINEAR	V	820 m	MPC · JPL
275641	2000 GE_{46}	—	April 5, 2000	Socorro	LINEAR	MAS	920 m	MPC · JPL
275642	2000 GW_{48}	—	April 5, 2000	Socorro	LINEAR	EOS	2.8 km	MPC · JPL
275643	2000 GS_{52}	—	April 5, 2000	Socorro	LINEAR	·	1.0 km	MPC · JPL
275644	2000 GF_{56}	—	April 5, 2000	Socorro	LINEAR	·	3.2 km	MPC · JPL
275645	2000 GO_{85}	—	April 3, 2000	Socorro	LINEAR	·	2.9 km	MPC · JPL
275646	2000 GX_{94}	—	April 6, 2000	Socorro	LINEAR	RAF	1.6 km	MPC · JPL
275647	2000 GR_{105}	—	April 7, 2000	Socorro	LINEAR	·	4.0 km	MPC · JPL
275648	2000 GK_{130}	—	April 5, 2000	Kitt Peak	Spacewatch	NYS	1.1 km	MPC · JPL
275649	2000 GJ_{131}	—	April 7, 2000	Kitt Peak	Spacewatch	NYS	920 m	MPC · JPL
275650	2000 GB_{165}	—	April 5, 2000	Socorro	LINEAR	NYS	1.4 km	MPC · JPL
275651	2000 GS_{169}	—	April 3, 2000	Anderson Mesa	LONEOS	·	1.3 km	MPC · JPL
275652	2000 HN_{19}	—	April 27, 2000	Kitt Peak	Spacewatch	·	3.2 km	MPC · JPL
275653	2000 HF_{39}	—	April 29, 2000	Kitt Peak	Spacewatch	NYS	1.0 km	MPC · JPL
275654	2000 HM_{62}	—	April 25, 2000	Kitt Peak	Spacewatch	·	3.5 km	MPC · JPL
275655	2000 KG_{2}	—	May 26, 2000	Socorro	LINEAR	PHO	1.3 km	MPC · JPL
275656	2000 KZ_{4}	—	May 27, 2000	Socorro	LINEAR	T_{j} (2.99)	5.0 km	MPC · JPL
275657	2000 KS_{11}	—	May 28, 2000	Socorro	LINEAR	NYS	1.3 km	MPC · JPL
275658	2000 KC_{12}	—	May 28, 2000	Socorro	LINEAR	·	1.7 km	MPC · JPL
275659	2000 KC_{25}	—	May 28, 2000	Socorro	LINEAR	·	3.5 km	MPC · JPL
275660	2000 KO_{79}	—	May 27, 2000	Socorro	LINEAR	·	1.5 km	MPC · JPL
275661	2000 LR_{2}	—	June 1, 2000	Kitt Peak	Spacewatch	LIX	5.7 km	MPC · JPL
275662	2000 LE_{22}	—	June 6, 2000	Kitt Peak	Spacewatch	·	5.2 km	MPC · JPL
275663	2000 LO_{23}	—	June 1, 2000	Socorro	LINEAR	·	6.2 km	MPC · JPL
275664	2000 LY_{37}	—	June 4, 2000	Kitt Peak	Spacewatch	ADE	2.4 km	MPC · JPL
275665	2000 NA_{14}	—	July 5, 2000	Anderson Mesa	LONEOS	·	2.4 km	MPC · JPL
275666	2000 OJ_{36}	—	July 24, 2000	Socorro	LINEAR	RAF	1.4 km	MPC · JPL
275667	2000 PO_{2}	—	August 2, 2000	Socorro	LINEAR	·	3.7 km	MPC · JPL
275668	2000 QV_{36}	—	August 24, 2000	Socorro	LINEAR	·	1.8 km	MPC · JPL
275669	2000 QO_{68}	—	August 25, 2000	Višnjan	K. Korlević	·	2.0 km	MPC · JPL
275670	2000 QE_{70}	—	August 25, 2000	Socorro	LINEAR	·	2.0 km	MPC · JPL
275671	2000 QF_{88}	—	August 25, 2000	Socorro	LINEAR	·	3.2 km	MPC · JPL
275672	2000 QQ_{136}	—	August 29, 2000	Socorro	LINEAR	·	1.1 km	MPC · JPL
275673	2000 QO_{157}	—	August 31, 2000	Socorro	LINEAR	·	2.1 km	MPC · JPL
275674	2000 QH_{168}	—	August 31, 2000	Socorro	LINEAR	·	2.0 km	MPC · JPL
275675	2000 QF_{211}	—	August 31, 2000	Socorro	LINEAR	·	810 m	MPC · JPL
275676	2000 QY_{241}	—	August 27, 2000	Cerro Tololo	M. W. Buie	·	1.2 km	MPC · JPL
275677	2000 RS_{11}	—	September 2, 2000	Socorro	LINEAR	APO · PHA	510 m	MPC · JPL
275678	2000 RY_{13}	—	September 1, 2000	Socorro	LINEAR	·	2.3 km	MPC · JPL
275679	2000 RP_{64}	—	September 1, 2000	Socorro	LINEAR	·	1.8 km	MPC · JPL
275680	2000 SV_{27}	—	September 23, 2000	Socorro	LINEAR	·	2.0 km	MPC · JPL
275681	2000 SQ_{33}	—	September 24, 2000	Socorro	LINEAR	L5	20 km	MPC · JPL
275682	2000 ST_{49}	—	September 23, 2000	Socorro	LINEAR	L5	14 km	MPC · JPL
275683	2000 SV_{54}	—	September 24, 2000	Socorro	LINEAR	·	1.1 km	MPC · JPL
275684	2000 SC_{56}	—	September 24, 2000	Socorro	LINEAR	·	1.2 km	MPC · JPL
275685	2000 SF_{81}	—	September 24, 2000	Socorro	LINEAR	EUN	1.4 km	MPC · JPL
275686	2000 SE_{106}	—	September 24, 2000	Socorro	LINEAR	·	1.6 km	MPC · JPL
275687	2000 SP_{133}	—	September 23, 2000	Socorro	LINEAR	EUN	1.2 km	MPC · JPL
275688	2000 SY_{137}	—	September 23, 2000	Socorro	LINEAR	·	3.0 km	MPC · JPL
275689	2000 SN_{138}	—	September 23, 2000	Socorro	LINEAR	·	2.2 km	MPC · JPL
275690	2000 SO_{157}	—	September 27, 2000	Socorro	LINEAR	·	2.7 km	MPC · JPL
275691	2000 SS_{168}	—	September 23, 2000	Socorro	LINEAR	·	2.1 km	MPC · JPL
275692	2000 SB_{174}	—	September 28, 2000	Socorro	LINEAR	·	1.8 km	MPC · JPL
275693	2000 SU_{201}	—	September 24, 2000	Socorro	LINEAR	·	1.2 km	MPC · JPL
275694	2000 SZ_{281}	—	September 23, 2000	Socorro	LINEAR	EUN	1.4 km	MPC · JPL
275695	2000 SF_{297}	—	September 28, 2000	Socorro	LINEAR	·	2.1 km	MPC · JPL
275696	2000 SF_{361}	—	September 23, 2000	Anderson Mesa	LONEOS	·	1.9 km	MPC · JPL
275697	2000 TL_{38}	—	October 1, 2000	Socorro	LINEAR	·	1.9 km	MPC · JPL
275698	2000 TA_{44}	—	October 1, 2000	Socorro	LINEAR	·	1.9 km	MPC · JPL
275699	2000 TH_{60}	—	October 2, 2000	Anderson Mesa	LONEOS	·	2.2 km	MPC · JPL
275700	2000 TL_{66}	—	October 1, 2000	Socorro	LINEAR	·	1.6 km	MPC · JPL

== 275701–275800 ==
back to top

Designation			Discovery			Properties		Ref
Permanent	Provisional	Named after	Date	Site	Discoverer(s)	Category	Diam.	Ref
275701	2000 UA_{30}	—	October 25, 2000	Socorro	LINEAR	·	2.7 km	MPC · JPL
275702	2000 UM_{55}	—	October 24, 2000	Socorro	LINEAR	·	2.4 km	MPC · JPL
275703	2000 UV_{67}	—	October 25, 2000	Socorro	LINEAR	·	1.8 km	MPC · JPL
275704	2000 VQ_{4}	—	November 1, 2000	Socorro	LINEAR	(21344)	2.0 km	MPC · JPL
275705	2000 VU_{14}	—	November 1, 2000	Socorro	LINEAR	MAR	1.7 km	MPC · JPL
275706	2000 VU_{40}	—	November 1, 2000	Socorro	LINEAR	·	2.2 km	MPC · JPL
275707	2000 WH_{20}	—	November 25, 2000	Kitt Peak	Spacewatch	·	1.7 km	MPC · JPL
275708	2000 WR_{27}	—	October 1, 1995	Kitt Peak	Spacewatch	·	2.5 km	MPC · JPL
275709	2000 WJ_{31}	—	November 20, 2000	Socorro	LINEAR	·	2.0 km	MPC · JPL
275710	2000 WV_{64}	—	November 27, 2000	Kitt Peak	Spacewatch	EUN	1.9 km	MPC · JPL
275711	2000 WP_{65}	—	November 28, 2000	Kitt Peak	Spacewatch	·	2.4 km	MPC · JPL
275712	2000 WV_{129}	—	November 19, 2000	Kitt Peak	Spacewatch	EUN	1.7 km	MPC · JPL
275713	2000 WZ_{137}	—	November 21, 2000	Socorro	LINEAR	(5)	1.8 km	MPC · JPL
275714	2000 YH_{4}	—	December 19, 2000	Anderson Mesa	LONEOS	APO	610 m	MPC · JPL
275715	2000 YL_{32}	—	December 30, 2000	Socorro	LINEAR	H	860 m	MPC · JPL
275716	2000 YY_{41}	—	December 30, 2000	Socorro	LINEAR	EUN	2.5 km	MPC · JPL
275717	2000 YD_{59}	—	December 30, 2000	Socorro	LINEAR	AEO	2.7 km	MPC · JPL
275718	2000 YM_{93}	—	December 30, 2000	Socorro	LINEAR	·	4.1 km	MPC · JPL
275719	2000 YY_{108}	—	December 30, 2000	Socorro	LINEAR	·	4.3 km	MPC · JPL
275720	2000 YL_{129}	—	December 29, 2000	Kitt Peak	Spacewatch	·	2.6 km	MPC · JPL
275721	2001 AS_{5}	—	January 2, 2001	Socorro	LINEAR	·	3.1 km	MPC · JPL
275722	2001 AM_{19}	—	January 4, 2001	Socorro	LINEAR	H	800 m	MPC · JPL
275723	2001 AE_{22}	—	January 3, 2001	Socorro	LINEAR	·	2.2 km	MPC · JPL
275724	2001 AG_{23}	—	January 3, 2001	Socorro	LINEAR	·	2.9 km	MPC · JPL
275725	2001 AW_{30}	—	January 4, 2001	Socorro	LINEAR	·	2.3 km	MPC · JPL
275726	2001 BA_{2}	—	January 16, 2001	Kitt Peak	Spacewatch	·	690 m	MPC · JPL
275727	2001 BG_{61}	—	January 30, 2001	Junk Bond	Junk Bond	·	2.8 km	MPC · JPL
275728	2001 BS_{73}	—	January 29, 2001	Kvistaberg	Uppsala-DLR Asteroid Survey	·	5.7 km	MPC · JPL
275729	2001 CE_{14}	—	February 1, 2001	Socorro	LINEAR	·	1.6 km	MPC · JPL
275730	2001 CX_{29}	—	February 2, 2001	Anderson Mesa	LONEOS	·	3.7 km	MPC · JPL
275731	2001 DX_{56}	—	February 16, 2001	Kitt Peak	Spacewatch	·	1.8 km	MPC · JPL
275732	2001 DO_{79}	—	February 20, 2001	Haleakala	NEAT	·	1.9 km	MPC · JPL
275733	2001 DU_{102}	—	February 16, 2001	Socorro	LINEAR	·	3.5 km	MPC · JPL
275734	2001 ER_{3}	—	February 17, 2001	Socorro	LINEAR	·	950 m	MPC · JPL
275735	2001 ES_{13}	—	March 4, 2001	Socorro	LINEAR	H	1.0 km	MPC · JPL
275736	2001 FJ_{141}	—	March 23, 2001	Anderson Mesa	LONEOS	·	870 m	MPC · JPL
275737	2001 FS_{173}	—	March 21, 2001	Kitt Peak	Spacewatch	·	1.5 km	MPC · JPL
275738	2001 GT_{6}	—	April 15, 2001	Anderson Mesa	LONEOS	·	960 m	MPC · JPL
275739	2001 GX_{6}	—	April 15, 2001	Socorro	LINEAR	·	3.8 km	MPC · JPL
275740	2001 HS_{3}	—	April 17, 2001	Anderson Mesa	LONEOS	·	550 m	MPC · JPL
275741	2001 HV_{6}	—	April 18, 2001	Kitt Peak	Spacewatch	·	2.4 km	MPC · JPL
275742	2001 HL_{18}	—	April 23, 2001	Socorro	LINEAR	·	2.2 km	MPC · JPL
275743	2001 HH_{19}	—	April 24, 2001	Kitt Peak	Spacewatch	·	1.3 km	MPC · JPL
275744	2001 HO_{33}	—	April 16, 2001	Kitt Peak	Spacewatch	·	1.0 km	MPC · JPL
275745	2001 KD_{70}	—	May 22, 2001	Anderson Mesa	LONEOS	PHO	1.6 km	MPC · JPL
275746	2001 LA_{18}	—	June 15, 2001	Palomar	NEAT	·	1.4 km	MPC · JPL
275747	2001 MT_{9}	—	June 22, 2001	Palomar	NEAT	·	3.6 km	MPC · JPL
275748	2001 MF_{19}	—	June 20, 2001	Palomar	NEAT	·	3.6 km	MPC · JPL
275749	2001 OL_{9}	—	July 19, 2001	Palomar	NEAT	·	1.1 km	MPC · JPL
275750	2001 ON_{15}	—	July 18, 2001	Palomar	NEAT	·	3.7 km	MPC · JPL
275751	2001 OH_{33}	—	July 19, 2001	Palomar	NEAT	·	3.4 km	MPC · JPL
275752	2001 OS_{34}	—	July 19, 2001	Palomar	NEAT	·	1.2 km	MPC · JPL
275753	2001 OC_{35}	—	July 19, 2001	Palomar	NEAT	PHO	1.7 km	MPC · JPL
275754	2001 OZ_{36}	—	July 20, 2001	Palomar	NEAT	EOS	3.0 km	MPC · JPL
275755	2001 OF_{41}	—	July 21, 2001	Palomar	NEAT	TIR	3.8 km	MPC · JPL
275756	2001 OL_{41}	—	July 21, 2001	Palomar	NEAT	·	920 m	MPC · JPL
275757	2001 OD_{44}	—	July 23, 2001	Palomar	NEAT	·	5.2 km	MPC · JPL
275758	2001 OZ_{49}	—	July 17, 2001	Haleakala	NEAT	V	1.1 km	MPC · JPL
275759	2001 OG_{76}	—	July 19, 2001	Haleakala	NEAT	·	1.5 km	MPC · JPL
275760	2001 OB_{85}	—	July 20, 2001	Anderson Mesa	LONEOS	·	2.0 km	MPC · JPL
275761	2001 OR_{110}	—	July 27, 2001	Palomar	NEAT	(2076)	1.0 km	MPC · JPL
275762	2001 OG_{113}	—	July 22, 2001	Palomar	NEAT	·	6.8 km	MPC · JPL
275763	2001 PG_{11}	—	August 9, 2001	Palomar	NEAT	·	3.1 km	MPC · JPL
275764	2001 PM_{23}	—	August 11, 2001	Haleakala	NEAT	ERI	2.9 km	MPC · JPL
275765	2001 PT_{29}	—	August 12, 2001	Eskridge	G. Hug	·	1.1 km	MPC · JPL
275766	2001 PJ_{30}	—	August 10, 2001	Palomar	NEAT	·	1.3 km	MPC · JPL
275767	2001 PE_{32}	—	August 10, 2001	Palomar	NEAT	·	960 m	MPC · JPL
275768	2001 PY_{33}	—	August 10, 2001	Palomar	NEAT	·	940 m	MPC · JPL
275769	2001 PN_{35}	—	August 11, 2001	Palomar	NEAT	H	650 m	MPC · JPL
275770	2001 PM_{36}	—	August 11, 2001	Palomar	NEAT	·	3.9 km	MPC · JPL
275771	2001 PU_{36}	—	August 11, 2001	Palomar	NEAT	·	4.1 km	MPC · JPL
275772	2001 PU_{37}	—	August 11, 2001	Palomar	NEAT	TIR	3.8 km	MPC · JPL
275773	2001 PU_{38}	—	August 11, 2001	Palomar	NEAT	·	4.7 km	MPC · JPL
275774	2001 PO_{47}	—	August 13, 2001	Haleakala	NEAT	·	4.7 km	MPC · JPL
275775	2001 PX_{56}	—	August 14, 2001	Haleakala	NEAT	·	1.2 km	MPC · JPL
275776	2001 PC_{65}	—	August 8, 2001	Haleakala	NEAT	·	4.2 km	MPC · JPL
275777	2001 QK_{1}	—	August 16, 2001	Socorro	LINEAR	·	3.1 km	MPC · JPL
275778	2001 QD_{7}	—	August 16, 2001	Socorro	LINEAR	·	870 m	MPC · JPL
275779	2001 QK_{9}	—	August 16, 2001	Socorro	LINEAR	·	1.8 km	MPC · JPL
275780	2001 QQ_{20}	—	August 16, 2001	Socorro	LINEAR	THB	5.0 km	MPC · JPL
275781	2001 QZ_{25}	—	August 16, 2001	Socorro	LINEAR	slow	5.0 km	MPC · JPL
275782	2001 QP_{36}	—	August 16, 2001	Socorro	LINEAR	·	1.1 km	MPC · JPL
275783	2001 QL_{50}	—	August 16, 2001	Socorro	LINEAR	·	1.2 km	MPC · JPL
275784	2001 QN_{56}	—	August 16, 2001	Socorro	LINEAR	·	4.1 km	MPC · JPL
275785	2001 QU_{71}	—	August 20, 2001	Terre Haute	Wolfe, C.	·	5.3 km	MPC · JPL
275786 Bouley	2001 QX_{72}	Bouley	August 20, 2001	Pic du Midi	Pic du Midi	NYS	1.1 km	MPC · JPL
275787	2001 QX_{84}	—	August 19, 2001	Socorro	LINEAR	·	1.3 km	MPC · JPL
275788	2001 QY_{95}	—	August 23, 2001	Kitt Peak	Spacewatch	·	3.3 km	MPC · JPL
275789	2001 QW_{117}	—	August 17, 2001	Socorro	LINEAR	·	1.9 km	MPC · JPL
275790	2001 QS_{130}	—	August 20, 2001	Socorro	LINEAR	·	2.7 km	MPC · JPL
275791	2001 QP_{132}	—	August 20, 2001	Socorro	LINEAR	V	970 m	MPC · JPL
275792	2001 QH_{142}	—	August 23, 2001	Socorro	LINEAR	AMO	740 m	MPC · JPL
275793	2001 QT_{148}	—	August 20, 2001	Haleakala	NEAT	V	910 m	MPC · JPL
275794	2001 QD_{164}	—	August 21, 2001	Palomar	NEAT	(31811)	4.2 km	MPC · JPL
275795	2001 QH_{166}	—	August 24, 2001	Haleakala	NEAT	V	880 m	MPC · JPL
275796	2001 QY_{172}	—	August 25, 2001	Socorro	LINEAR	·	3.7 km	MPC · JPL
275797	2001 QC_{175}	—	August 21, 2001	Kitt Peak	Spacewatch	·	1.5 km	MPC · JPL
275798	2001 QL_{183}	—	August 25, 2001	Bergisch Gladbach	W. Bickel	·	1.6 km	MPC · JPL
275799	2001 QJ_{186}	—	August 21, 2001	Kitt Peak	Spacewatch	NYS	960 m	MPC · JPL
275800	2001 QN_{193}	—	August 22, 2001	Palomar	NEAT	EUP	4.0 km	MPC · JPL

== 275801–275900 ==
back to top

Designation			Discovery			Properties		Ref
Permanent	Provisional	Named after	Date	Site	Discoverer(s)	Category	Diam.	Ref
275801	2001 QT_{204}	—	August 23, 2001	Anderson Mesa	LONEOS	V	1.0 km	MPC · JPL
275802	2001 QP_{215}	—	August 23, 2001	Anderson Mesa	LONEOS	·	3.7 km	MPC · JPL
275803	2001 QV_{222}	—	August 24, 2001	Anderson Mesa	LONEOS	·	3.2 km	MPC · JPL
275804	2001 QQ_{228}	—	August 24, 2001	Anderson Mesa	LONEOS	·	1.4 km	MPC · JPL
275805	2001 QT_{275}	—	August 19, 2001	Socorro	LINEAR	ERI	2.2 km	MPC · JPL
275806	2001 QT_{284}	—	August 31, 2001	Palomar	NEAT	NYS	1.6 km	MPC · JPL
275807	2001 QQ_{288}	—	August 17, 2001	Palomar	NEAT	·	4.9 km	MPC · JPL
275808	2001 QT_{292}	—	August 16, 2001	Palomar	NEAT	EUP	3.6 km	MPC · JPL
275809	2001 QY_{297}	—	August 21, 2001	Cerro Tololo	M. W. Buie	cubewano (cold) · moon	169 km	MPC · JPL
275810	2001 RS	—	September 8, 2001	Socorro	LINEAR	PHO	1.7 km	MPC · JPL
275811	2001 RT	—	September 8, 2001	Socorro	LINEAR	·	6.7 km	MPC · JPL
275812	2001 RG_{1}	—	September 7, 2001	Socorro	LINEAR	V	830 m	MPC · JPL
275813	2001 RO_{12}	—	September 8, 2001	Socorro	LINEAR	·	3.8 km	MPC · JPL
275814	2001 RJ_{14}	—	September 10, 2001	Socorro	LINEAR	EUP	5.9 km	MPC · JPL
275815	2001 RZ_{14}	—	September 10, 2001	Socorro	LINEAR	TIR	2.9 km	MPC · JPL
275816	2001 RC_{17}	—	September 11, 2001	Desert Eagle	W. K. Y. Yeung	MAS	960 m	MPC · JPL
275817	2001 RK_{17}	—	September 11, 2001	Desert Eagle	W. K. Y. Yeung	·	1.5 km	MPC · JPL
275818	2001 RZ_{35}	—	September 8, 2001	Socorro	LINEAR	·	1.6 km	MPC · JPL
275819	2001 RN_{38}	—	September 8, 2001	Socorro	LINEAR	·	1.6 km	MPC · JPL
275820	2001 RX_{48}	—	September 11, 2001	Socorro	LINEAR	·	2.0 km	MPC · JPL
275821	2001 RX_{50}	—	September 11, 2001	Socorro	LINEAR	NYS	1.3 km	MPC · JPL
275822	2001 RE_{51}	—	September 11, 2001	Socorro	LINEAR	·	3.7 km	MPC · JPL
275823	2001 RC_{55}	—	September 12, 2001	Socorro	LINEAR	·	3.2 km	MPC · JPL
275824	2001 RP_{57}	—	September 12, 2001	Socorro	LINEAR	·	1.2 km	MPC · JPL
275825	2001 RD_{69}	—	September 10, 2001	Socorro	LINEAR	·	1.9 km	MPC · JPL
275826	2001 RH_{82}	—	September 11, 2001	Anderson Mesa	LONEOS	·	3.6 km	MPC · JPL
275827	2001 RZ_{85}	—	September 11, 2001	Anderson Mesa	LONEOS	V	880 m	MPC · JPL
275828	2001 RH_{90}	—	September 11, 2001	Anderson Mesa	LONEOS	·	1.3 km	MPC · JPL
275829	2001 RR_{99}	—	September 12, 2001	Socorro	LINEAR	·	4.3 km	MPC · JPL
275830	2001 RQ_{101}	—	September 12, 2001	Socorro	LINEAR	·	1.6 km	MPC · JPL
275831	2001 RE_{103}	—	September 12, 2001	Socorro	LINEAR	·	860 m	MPC · JPL
275832	2001 RB_{106}	—	September 12, 2001	Socorro	LINEAR	THM	3.0 km	MPC · JPL
275833	2001 RD_{122}	—	September 12, 2001	Socorro	LINEAR	·	3.9 km	MPC · JPL
275834	2001 RR_{122}	—	September 12, 2001	Socorro	LINEAR	·	1.8 km	MPC · JPL
275835	2001 RG_{130}	—	September 12, 2001	Socorro	LINEAR	·	1.1 km	MPC · JPL
275836	2001 RY_{138}	—	September 12, 2001	Socorro	LINEAR	NYS	1.5 km	MPC · JPL
275837	2001 RF_{139}	—	September 12, 2001	Socorro	LINEAR	MAS	840 m	MPC · JPL
275838	2001 RC_{142}	—	September 12, 2001	Socorro	LINEAR	H	790 m	MPC · JPL
275839	2001 RF_{146}	—	September 8, 2001	Anderson Mesa	LONEOS	·	3.7 km	MPC · JPL
275840	2001 RS_{152}	—	September 11, 2001	Anderson Mesa	LONEOS	·	2.0 km	MPC · JPL
275841	2001 SH_{4}	—	September 17, 2001	Goodricke-Pigott	R. A. Tucker	MRX	1.2 km	MPC · JPL
275842	2001 SC_{5}	—	September 17, 2001	Socorro	LINEAR	·	2.0 km	MPC · JPL
275843	2001 SC_{30}	—	September 16, 2001	Socorro	LINEAR	V	950 m	MPC · JPL
275844	2001 SN_{33}	—	September 16, 2001	Socorro	LINEAR	·	1.1 km	MPC · JPL
275845	2001 SA_{38}	—	September 16, 2001	Socorro	LINEAR	MAS	930 m	MPC · JPL
275846	2001 SR_{43}	—	September 16, 2001	Socorro	LINEAR	·	1.3 km	MPC · JPL
275847	2001 SM_{61}	—	September 17, 2001	Socorro	LINEAR	·	1.6 km	MPC · JPL
275848	2001 SP_{76}	—	September 16, 2001	Socorro	LINEAR	·	980 m	MPC · JPL
275849	2001 SK_{83}	—	September 20, 2001	Socorro	LINEAR	·	1.4 km	MPC · JPL
275850	2001 SY_{83}	—	September 20, 2001	Socorro	LINEAR	·	1.1 km	MPC · JPL
275851	2001 SW_{94}	—	September 20, 2001	Socorro	LINEAR	EOS	3.0 km	MPC · JPL
275852	2001 SN_{100}	—	September 20, 2001	Socorro	LINEAR	V	980 m	MPC · JPL
275853	2001 SN_{113}	—	September 20, 2001	Desert Eagle	W. K. Y. Yeung	·	3.3 km	MPC · JPL
275854	2001 SB_{122}	—	September 16, 2001	Socorro	LINEAR	·	1.5 km	MPC · JPL
275855	2001 SU_{127}	—	September 16, 2001	Socorro	LINEAR	·	4.9 km	MPC · JPL
275856	2001 SN_{141}	—	September 16, 2001	Socorro	LINEAR	·	1.8 km	MPC · JPL
275857	2001 SL_{142}	—	September 16, 2001	Socorro	LINEAR	V	880 m	MPC · JPL
275858	2001 SL_{145}	—	September 16, 2001	Socorro	LINEAR	V	1.1 km	MPC · JPL
275859	2001 SC_{156}	—	September 17, 2001	Socorro	LINEAR	T_{j} (2.98)	3.7 km	MPC · JPL
275860	2001 SJ_{158}	—	September 17, 2001	Socorro	LINEAR	·	2.6 km	MPC · JPL
275861	2001 ST_{162}	—	September 17, 2001	Socorro	LINEAR	·	1.3 km	MPC · JPL
275862	2001 SG_{174}	—	September 16, 2001	Socorro	LINEAR	·	1.6 km	MPC · JPL
275863	2001 SB_{175}	—	September 16, 2001	Socorro	LINEAR	·	1.1 km	MPC · JPL
275864	2001 SP_{175}	—	September 16, 2001	Socorro	LINEAR	MAS	1.1 km	MPC · JPL
275865	2001 SP_{180}	—	September 19, 2001	Socorro	LINEAR	PHO	910 m	MPC · JPL
275866	2001 SZ_{197}	—	September 19, 2001	Socorro	LINEAR	·	1.6 km	MPC · JPL
275867	2001 SB_{217}	—	September 19, 2001	Socorro	LINEAR	·	980 m	MPC · JPL
275868	2001 SL_{220}	—	September 19, 2001	Socorro	LINEAR	·	2.0 km	MPC · JPL
275869	2001 SV_{225}	—	September 19, 2001	Socorro	LINEAR	·	1.0 km	MPC · JPL
275870	2001 SU_{226}	—	September 19, 2001	Socorro	LINEAR	·	930 m	MPC · JPL
275871	2001 SU_{244}	—	September 19, 2001	Socorro	LINEAR	·	1.2 km	MPC · JPL
275872	2001 SA_{245}	—	September 19, 2001	Socorro	LINEAR	GEF	1.3 km	MPC · JPL
275873	2001 SP_{255}	—	September 19, 2001	Socorro	LINEAR	·	980 m	MPC · JPL
275874	2001 SB_{259}	—	September 20, 2001	Socorro	LINEAR	·	1.1 km	MPC · JPL
275875	2001 SO_{264}	—	September 25, 2001	Socorro	LINEAR	H	590 m	MPC · JPL
275876	2001 ST_{292}	—	September 16, 2001	Socorro	LINEAR	·	1.9 km	MPC · JPL
275877	2001 SR_{294}	—	September 20, 2001	Socorro	LINEAR	·	1.6 km	MPC · JPL
275878	2001 SG_{297}	—	September 20, 2001	Socorro	LINEAR	·	1.0 km	MPC · JPL
275879	2001 SD_{325}	—	September 16, 2001	Socorro	LINEAR	(5)	1.5 km	MPC · JPL
275880	2001 SW_{345}	—	September 23, 2001	Haleakala	NEAT	·	1.4 km	MPC · JPL
275881	2001 SR_{355}	—	April 10, 2003	Kitt Peak	Spacewatch	·	1.2 km	MPC · JPL
275882	2001 TY_{14}	—	October 10, 2001	Palomar	NEAT	·	1.4 km	MPC · JPL
275883	2001 TT_{15}	—	October 11, 2001	Socorro	LINEAR	·	1.4 km	MPC · JPL
275884	2001 TP_{22}	—	October 13, 2001	Socorro	LINEAR	·	1.1 km	MPC · JPL
275885	2001 TS_{23}	—	October 14, 2001	Socorro	LINEAR	NYS	1.5 km	MPC · JPL
275886	2001 TT_{32}	—	October 14, 2001	Socorro	LINEAR	GAL	2.1 km	MPC · JPL
275887	2001 TO_{35}	—	October 14, 2001	Socorro	LINEAR	·	2.9 km	MPC · JPL
275888	2001 TT_{39}	—	October 14, 2001	Socorro	LINEAR	·	3.2 km	MPC · JPL
275889	2001 TW_{47}	—	October 14, 2001	Cima Ekar	ADAS	·	1.2 km	MPC · JPL
275890	2001 TV_{48}	—	October 14, 2001	Socorro	LINEAR	·	2.0 km	MPC · JPL
275891	2001 TG_{52}	—	October 13, 2001	Socorro	LINEAR	·	1.7 km	MPC · JPL
275892	2001 TE_{53}	—	October 13, 2001	Socorro	LINEAR	V	910 m	MPC · JPL
275893	2001 TK_{53}	—	October 13, 2001	Socorro	LINEAR	EUP	3.7 km	MPC · JPL
275894	2001 TL_{57}	—	October 13, 2001	Socorro	LINEAR	·	1.4 km	MPC · JPL
275895	2001 TB_{58}	—	October 13, 2001	Socorro	LINEAR	HYG	3.5 km	MPC · JPL
275896	2001 TG_{62}	—	October 13, 2001	Socorro	LINEAR	·	1.9 km	MPC · JPL
275897	2001 TL_{76}	—	October 13, 2001	Socorro	LINEAR	NYS · fast ·	2.5 km	MPC · JPL
275898	2001 TM_{81}	—	October 14, 2001	Socorro	LINEAR	·	1.5 km	MPC · JPL
275899	2001 TB_{83}	—	October 14, 2001	Socorro	LINEAR	·	1.6 km	MPC · JPL
275900	2001 TK_{86}	—	October 14, 2001	Socorro	LINEAR	V	780 m	MPC · JPL

== 275901–276000 ==
back to top

Designation			Discovery			Properties		Ref
Permanent	Provisional	Named after	Date	Site	Discoverer(s)	Category	Diam.	Ref
275901	2001 TY_{87}	—	October 14, 2001	Socorro	LINEAR	·	1.3 km	MPC · JPL
275902	2001 TM_{89}	—	October 14, 2001	Socorro	LINEAR	·	740 m	MPC · JPL
275903	2001 TX_{89}	—	October 14, 2001	Socorro	LINEAR	·	4.4 km	MPC · JPL
275904	2001 TV_{102}	—	October 15, 2001	Socorro	LINEAR	·	1.6 km	MPC · JPL
275905	2001 TN_{115}	—	October 14, 2001	Socorro	LINEAR	·	1.1 km	MPC · JPL
275906	2001 TW_{124}	—	October 12, 2001	Haleakala	NEAT	·	1.3 km	MPC · JPL
275907	2001 TE_{139}	—	October 10, 2001	Palomar	NEAT	NYS	1.3 km	MPC · JPL
275908	2001 TG_{140}	—	October 10, 2001	Palomar	NEAT	·	1.4 km	MPC · JPL
275909	2001 TX_{142}	—	October 10, 2001	Palomar	NEAT	·	4.4 km	MPC · JPL
275910	2001 TJ_{143}	—	October 10, 2001	Palomar	NEAT	·	2.6 km	MPC · JPL
275911	2001 TD_{149}	—	October 10, 2001	Palomar	NEAT	NYS	1.9 km	MPC · JPL
275912	2001 TW_{149}	—	October 10, 2001	Palomar	NEAT	·	1.4 km	MPC · JPL
275913	2001 TK_{151}	—	October 10, 2001	Palomar	NEAT	·	1.9 km	MPC · JPL
275914	2001 TU_{154}	—	October 15, 2001	Palomar	NEAT	·	3.1 km	MPC · JPL
275915	2001 TB_{171}	—	October 15, 2001	Haleakala	NEAT	·	2.2 km	MPC · JPL
275916	2001 TL_{173}	—	October 14, 2001	Socorro	LINEAR	·	1.7 km	MPC · JPL
275917	2001 TN_{177}	—	October 14, 2001	Socorro	LINEAR	CYB	6.0 km	MPC · JPL
275918	2001 TB_{178}	—	October 14, 2001	Socorro	LINEAR	·	1.6 km	MPC · JPL
275919	2001 TM_{184}	—	October 14, 2001	Socorro	LINEAR	V	870 m	MPC · JPL
275920	2001 TQ_{184}	—	October 14, 2001	Socorro	LINEAR	·	1.2 km	MPC · JPL
275921	2001 TT_{201}	—	October 11, 2001	Socorro	LINEAR	·	3.1 km	MPC · JPL
275922	2001 TZ_{203}	—	October 11, 2001	Socorro	LINEAR	·	2.6 km	MPC · JPL
275923	2001 TH_{204}	—	October 11, 2001	Socorro	LINEAR	·	740 m	MPC · JPL
275924	2001 TQ_{226}	—	October 14, 2001	Palomar	NEAT	PHO	1.2 km	MPC · JPL
275925	2001 TN_{229}	—	October 15, 2001	Socorro	LINEAR	ADE	3.1 km	MPC · JPL
275926	2001 TG_{240}	—	October 11, 2001	Palomar	NEAT	·	1.0 km	MPC · JPL
275927	2001 TZ_{241}	—	October 14, 2001	Anderson Mesa	LONEOS	LIX	4.9 km	MPC · JPL
275928	2001 TU_{256}	—	October 14, 2001	Socorro	LINEAR	·	1.7 km	MPC · JPL
275929	2001 TM_{258}	—	October 10, 2001	Palomar	NEAT	·	1.8 km	MPC · JPL
275930	2001 UE_{10}	—	October 23, 2001	Kitt Peak	Spacewatch	·	2.2 km	MPC · JPL
275931	2001 UM_{21}	—	October 17, 2001	Socorro	LINEAR	·	1.9 km	MPC · JPL
275932	2001 UM_{28}	—	October 16, 2001	Socorro	LINEAR	·	940 m	MPC · JPL
275933	2001 UO_{39}	—	October 17, 2001	Socorro	LINEAR	GEF	1.5 km	MPC · JPL
275934	2001 UK_{49}	—	October 17, 2001	Socorro	LINEAR	H	830 m	MPC · JPL
275935	2001 UA_{52}	—	October 17, 2001	Socorro	LINEAR	·	1.4 km	MPC · JPL
275936	2001 UP_{55}	—	October 17, 2001	Socorro	LINEAR	·	1.1 km	MPC · JPL
275937	2001 UK_{65}	—	October 18, 2001	Socorro	LINEAR	·	1.8 km	MPC · JPL
275938	2001 UP_{82}	—	October 20, 2001	Socorro	LINEAR	·	1.4 km	MPC · JPL
275939	2001 UM_{92}	—	October 18, 2001	Palomar	NEAT	·	1.6 km	MPC · JPL
275940	2001 UM_{105}	—	October 20, 2001	Socorro	LINEAR	·	3.1 km	MPC · JPL
275941	2001 UX_{123}	—	October 22, 2001	Palomar	NEAT	·	1.4 km	MPC · JPL
275942	2001 UA_{131}	—	October 20, 2001	Socorro	LINEAR	·	1.8 km	MPC · JPL
275943	2001 UX_{142}	—	October 23, 2001	Socorro	LINEAR	·	1.9 km	MPC · JPL
275944	2001 UG_{148}	—	October 23, 2001	Socorro	LINEAR	·	2.2 km	MPC · JPL
275945	2001 UH_{158}	—	October 23, 2001	Socorro	LINEAR	T_{j} (2.95)	4.3 km	MPC · JPL
275946	2001 UZ_{170}	—	October 21, 2001	Socorro	LINEAR	·	2.1 km	MPC · JPL
275947	2001 UH_{183}	—	October 16, 2001	Socorro	LINEAR	·	1.8 km	MPC · JPL
275948	2001 UF_{186}	—	October 17, 2001	Socorro	LINEAR	EUP	6.0 km	MPC · JPL
275949	2001 UM_{188}	—	October 17, 2001	Socorro	LINEAR	·	1.8 km	MPC · JPL
275950	2001 UP_{226}	—	October 16, 2001	Palomar	NEAT	·	1.0 km	MPC · JPL
275951	2001 VC_{1}	—	November 6, 2001	Socorro	LINEAR	T_{j} (2.98) · EUP	4.2 km	MPC · JPL
275952	2001 VM_{3}	—	November 11, 2001	Kitt Peak	Spacewatch	·	1.4 km	MPC · JPL
275953	2001 VX_{54}	—	November 10, 2001	Socorro	LINEAR	·	1.1 km	MPC · JPL
275954	2001 VN_{68}	—	November 11, 2001	Socorro	LINEAR	·	2.6 km	MPC · JPL
275955	2001 VY_{68}	—	November 11, 2001	Socorro	LINEAR	·	1.9 km	MPC · JPL
275956	2001 VM_{93}	—	November 15, 2001	Socorro	LINEAR	·	3.2 km	MPC · JPL
275957	2001 VL_{100}	—	November 12, 2001	Anderson Mesa	LONEOS	·	1.5 km	MPC · JPL
275958	2001 VQ_{111}	—	November 12, 2001	Socorro	LINEAR	·	1.2 km	MPC · JPL
275959	2001 VE_{126}	—	November 14, 2001	Kitt Peak	Spacewatch	·	980 m	MPC · JPL
275960	2001 VS_{128}	—	November 11, 2001	Apache Point	SDSS	·	1.3 km	MPC · JPL
275961	2001 VU_{128}	—	November 11, 2001	Apache Point	SDSS	·	1.1 km	MPC · JPL
275962 Chalverat	2001 WU_{5}	Chalverat	November 21, 2001	Vicques	M. Ory	·	1.3 km	MPC · JPL
275963	2001 WD_{8}	—	November 17, 2001	Socorro	LINEAR	·	2.2 km	MPC · JPL
275964	2001 WR_{17}	—	November 17, 2001	Socorro	LINEAR	·	1.8 km	MPC · JPL
275965	2001 WE_{18}	—	November 17, 2001	Socorro	LINEAR	·	2.4 km	MPC · JPL
275966	2001 WE_{33}	—	November 17, 2001	Socorro	LINEAR	(5)	1.5 km	MPC · JPL
275967	2001 WW_{36}	—	November 17, 2001	Socorro	LINEAR	PHO	1.3 km	MPC · JPL
275968	2001 WG_{40}	—	November 17, 2001	Socorro	LINEAR	·	3.6 km	MPC · JPL
275969	2001 WP_{58}	—	November 19, 2001	Socorro	LINEAR	·	1.8 km	MPC · JPL
275970	2001 WB_{84}	—	November 20, 2001	Socorro	LINEAR	·	1.5 km	MPC · JPL
275971	2001 WS_{91}	—	November 21, 2001	Socorro	LINEAR	·	1.9 km	MPC · JPL
275972	2001 WQ_{97}	—	November 18, 2001	Haleakala	NEAT	PHO	1.1 km	MPC · JPL
275973	2001 WB_{104}	—	November 21, 2001	Apache Point	SDSS	·	1.5 km	MPC · JPL
275974	2001 XD	—	December 2, 2001	Palomar	NEAT	APO	630 m	MPC · JPL
275975	2001 XF_{1}	—	December 7, 2001	Socorro	LINEAR	APO	450 m	MPC · JPL
275976	2001 XV_{10}	—	December 9, 2001	Socorro	LINEAR	APO +1km	2.4 km	MPC · JPL
275977	2001 XW_{15}	—	December 10, 2001	Socorro	LINEAR	·	2.1 km	MPC · JPL
275978	2001 XP_{17}	—	December 9, 2001	Socorro	LINEAR	·	2.0 km	MPC · JPL
275979	2001 XH_{48}	—	December 10, 2001	Socorro	LINEAR	H	1.1 km	MPC · JPL
275980	2001 XA_{50}	—	December 10, 2001	Socorro	LINEAR	·	1.8 km	MPC · JPL
275981	2001 XP_{71}	—	December 11, 2001	Socorro	LINEAR	·	1.8 km	MPC · JPL
275982	2001 XR_{78}	—	December 11, 2001	Socorro	LINEAR	·	2.3 km	MPC · JPL
275983	2001 XE_{82}	—	December 11, 2001	Socorro	LINEAR	·	1.5 km	MPC · JPL
275984	2001 XP_{82}	—	December 11, 2001	Socorro	LINEAR	·	1.4 km	MPC · JPL
275985	2001 XL_{90}	—	December 10, 2001	Socorro	LINEAR	·	2.0 km	MPC · JPL
275986	2001 XB_{93}	—	December 10, 2001	Socorro	LINEAR	·	1.6 km	MPC · JPL
275987	2001 XE_{96}	—	December 10, 2001	Socorro	LINEAR	·	2.0 km	MPC · JPL
275988	2001 XJ_{96}	—	December 10, 2001	Socorro	LINEAR	·	1.8 km	MPC · JPL
275989	2001 XC_{112}	—	December 11, 2001	Socorro	LINEAR	·	1.6 km	MPC · JPL
275990	2001 XT_{128}	—	December 14, 2001	Socorro	LINEAR	·	2.2 km	MPC · JPL
275991	2001 XZ_{128}	—	December 14, 2001	Socorro	LINEAR	·	1.3 km	MPC · JPL
275992	2001 XF_{134}	—	December 14, 2001	Socorro	LINEAR	·	1.9 km	MPC · JPL
275993	2001 XW_{134}	—	December 14, 2001	Socorro	LINEAR	T_{j} (2.98) · HIL · 3:2	3.7 km	MPC · JPL
275994	2001 XG_{144}	—	December 14, 2001	Socorro	LINEAR	·	1.3 km	MPC · JPL
275995	2001 XF_{152}	—	December 14, 2001	Socorro	LINEAR	·	1.8 km	MPC · JPL
275996	2001 XZ_{165}	—	December 14, 2001	Socorro	LINEAR	·	1.8 km	MPC · JPL
275997	2001 XB_{194}	—	December 14, 2001	Socorro	LINEAR	·	2.4 km	MPC · JPL
275998	2001 XV_{209}	—	December 11, 2001	Socorro	LINEAR	·	1.9 km	MPC · JPL
275999	2001 XP_{222}	—	December 15, 2001	Socorro	LINEAR	·	2.7 km	MPC · JPL
276000	2001 XO_{224}	—	December 15, 2001	Socorro	LINEAR	·	1.7 km	MPC · JPL

back to top

== See also ==
- Meanings of minor-planet names: 275001–276000
