= Meanings of minor-planet names: 275001–276000 =

As minor planet discoveries are confirmed, they are given a permanent number by the IAU's Minor Planet Center (MPC), and the discoverers can then submit names for them, following the IAU's naming conventions. The list below concerns those minor planets in the specified number-range that have received names, and explains the meanings of those names.

Official naming citations of newly named small Solar System bodies are approved and published in a bulletin by IAU's Working Group for Small Bodies Nomenclature (WGSBN). Before May 2021, citations were published in MPC's Minor Planet Circulars for many decades. Recent citations can also be found on the JPL Small-Body Database (SBDB). Until his death in 2016, German astronomer Lutz D. Schmadel compiled these citations into the Dictionary of Minor Planet Names (DMP) and regularly updated the collection.

Based on Paul Herget's The Names of the Minor Planets, Schmadel also researched the unclear origin of numerous asteroids, most of which had been named prior to World War II. This article incorporates text from this source, which is in the public domain: SBDB New namings may only be added to this list below after official publication as the preannouncement of names is condemned. The WGSBN publishes a comprehensive guideline for the naming rules of non-cometary small Solar System bodies.

== 275001–275100 ==
Named minor planet	Provisional	This minor planet was named for...	Ref · Catalog
There are no named minor planets in this number range

== 275101–275200 ==
back to top

Named minor planet	Provisional	This minor planet was named for...	Ref · Catalog
275106 Sarahdubeyjames	2009 VP_{42}	Sarah Jane Dubey-James (born 1977), the second daughter of British discoverer Norman Falla	JPL · 275106

== 275201–275300 ==
back to top

Named minor planet	Provisional	This minor planet was named for...	Ref · Catalog
275215 Didiermarouani	2009 WL_{184}	Didier Marouani (born 1953) is a world famous French composer and musician. He is the leader of the band Space, a pioneer of electronic space music. His music is loved by several generations of fans of astronomy and cosmonautics, who feel it inspires them to reach out to the stars.	IAU · 275215
275225 Kotarbinski	2009 WO_{215}	Wilhelm Kotarbinski (1848–1921), a Polish painter.	IAU · 275225
275264 Krisztike	2010 AB_{4}	Kristina Kürtiova (born 1995), a daughter of Slovak amateur astronomer Stefan Kürti who discovered this minor planet	JPL · 275264
275281 Amywalsh	2010 AE_{129}	Amy L. Walsh (born 1970), an avionics engineer at Ball Aerospace who developed and helps operate the WISE/NEOWISE command and data handling system (Src).	JPL · 275281

== 275301–275400 ==
back to top

Named minor planet	Provisional	This minor planet was named for...	Ref · Catalog
There are no named minor planets in this number range

== 275401–275500 ==
back to top

Named minor planet	Provisional	This minor planet was named for...	Ref · Catalog
There are no named minor planets in this number range

== 275501–275600 ==
back to top

Named minor planet	Provisional	This minor planet was named for...	Ref · Catalog
There are no named minor planets in this number range

== 275601–275700 ==
back to top

Named minor planet	Provisional	This minor planet was named for...	Ref · Catalog
There are no named minor planets in this number range

== 275701–275800 ==
back to top

Named minor planet	Provisional	This minor planet was named for...	Ref · Catalog
275786 Bouley	2001 QX_{72}	Sylvain Bouley (born 1982), a French planetary geologist who studies impact cratering (Src)	JPL · 275786

== 275801–275900 ==
back to top

Named minor planet	Provisional	This minor planet was named for...	Ref · Catalog
There are no named minor planets in this number range

== 275901–276000 ==
back to top

Named minor planet	Provisional	This minor planet was named for...	Ref · Catalog
275962 Chalverat	2001 WU_{5}	Joseph Chalverat (born 1950), the second curator of the Jura natural science museum in Porrentruy from 1999 to 2008.	JPL · 275962

back to top

Preceded by 274,001–275,000	Meanings of minor-planet names List of minor planets: 275,001–276,000	Succeeded by 276,001–277,000
