= Meanings of minor-planet names: 186001–187000 =

As minor planet discoveries are confirmed, they are given a permanent number by the IAU's Minor Planet Center (MPC), and the discoverers can then submit names for them, following the IAU's naming conventions. The list below concerns those minor planets in the specified number-range that have received names, and explains the meanings of those names.

Official naming citations of newly named small Solar System bodies are approved and published in a bulletin by IAU's Working Group for Small Bodies Nomenclature (WGSBN). Before May 2021, citations were published in MPC's Minor Planet Circulars for many decades. Recent citations can also be found on the JPL Small-Body Database (SBDB). Until his death in 2016, German astronomer Lutz D. Schmadel compiled these citations into the Dictionary of Minor Planet Names (DMP) and regularly updated the collection.

Based on Paul Herget's The Names of the Minor Planets, Schmadel also researched the unclear origin of numerous asteroids, most of which had been named prior to World War II. This article incorporates text from this source, which is in the public domain: SBDB New namings may only be added to this list below after official publication as the preannouncement of names is condemned. The WGSBN publishes a comprehensive guideline for the naming rules of non-cometary small Solar System bodies.

== 186001–186100 ==
Named minor planet	Provisional	This minor planet was named for...	Ref · Catalog
186007 Guilleminet	2001 QS_{100}	Pierre-François de Guilleminet (1691–1755), a French astronomer and mathematician with the Montpellier Royal Society of Sciences and designer of the Babote Observatory.	JPL · 186007

== 186101–186200 ==
back to top

Named minor planet	Provisional	This minor planet was named for...	Ref · Catalog
186142 Gillespie	2001 TO_{245}	Bruce Gillespie (born 1950), is an American astronomer with the Sloan Digital Sky Survey (SDSS). He was the Apache Point Observatory Operations Site Manager and the SDSS-III and -IV Program Manager	JPL · 186142

== 186201–186300 ==
back to top

Named minor planet	Provisional	This minor planet was named for...	Ref · Catalog
There are no named minor planets in this number range

== 186301–186400 ==
back to top

Named minor planet	Provisional	This minor planet was named for...	Ref · Catalog
There are no named minor planets in this number range

== 186401–186500 ==
back to top

Named minor planet	Provisional	This minor planet was named for...	Ref · Catalog
186411 Margaretsimon	2002 PF_{152}	Margaret Simon (born 1967), a strategic communications manager at the Johns Hopkins University Applied Physics Laboratory, who served as the External Events Coordinator for the New Horizons mission to Pluto.	JPL · 186411

== 186501–186600 ==
back to top

Named minor planet	Provisional	This minor planet was named for...	Ref · Catalog
There are no named minor planets in this number range

== 186601–186700 ==
back to top

Named minor planet	Provisional	This minor planet was named for...	Ref · Catalog
There are no named minor planets in this number range

== 186701–186800 ==
back to top

Named minor planet	Provisional	This minor planet was named for...	Ref · Catalog
There are no named minor planets in this number range

== 186801–186900 ==
back to top

Named minor planet	Provisional	This minor planet was named for...	Ref · Catalog
186832 Mosser	2004 FD_{76}	Mosser Roger (1936–1990), a French self-taught optician	JPL · 186832
186835 Normanspinrad	2004 FE_{92}	Norman Spinrad (born 1940), American science-fiction writer	JPL · 186835

== 186901–187000 ==
back to top

Named minor planet	Provisional	This minor planet was named for...	Ref · Catalog
There are no named minor planets in this number range

back to top

Preceded by 185,001–186,000	Meanings of minor-planet names List of minor planets: 186,001–187,000	Succeeded by 187,001–188,000
