= Rafael Ferrando =

Spanish astronomer

Minor planets discovered: 204
see § List of discovered minor planets

Rafael Ferrando (born 1966) is a Spanish astronomer, credited by the Minor Planet Center with the discovery of numerous minor planets between 2001 and 2010.

The main-belt asteroid 161545 Ferrando, discovered by Juan Lacruz, was named after him on 24 November 2007 (M.P.C. 61270).

== List of discovered minor planets ==
| 34854 Paquifrutos | 13 October 2001 | list |
| 64553 Segorbe | 24 November 2001 | list |
| 72827 Maxaub | 23 April 2001 | list |
| 78071 Vicent | 1 June 2002 | list |
| 88470 Joaquinescrig | 26 August 2001 | list |
| 90140 Gómezdonet | 28 December 2002 | list |
| 90414 Karpov | 19 December 2003 | list |
| 107223 Ripero | 21 January 2001 | list |
| 108113 Maza | 14 April 2001 | list |
| 109097 Hamuy | 19 August 2001 | list |
| 112656 Gines | 12 August 2002 | list |
| 113388 Davidmartinez | 28 September 2002 | list |
| 117406 Blasgámez | 7 January 2005 | list |
| 125476 Frangarcia | 27 November 2001 | list |
| (128461) 2004 OA | 16 July 2004 | list |
| 128474 Arbacia | 7 August 2004 | list |
| (132946) 2002 TG_{59} | 4 October 2002 | list |
| (135834) 2002 SO | 21 September 2002 | list |
| (141434) 2002 CP_{14} | 9 February 2002 | list |
| (146878) 2002 CN_{1} | 2 February 2002 | list |
| (149691) 2004 HN | 18 April 2004 | list |
| (154813) 2004 QA | 16 August 2004 | list |
| (156977) 2003 JV_{10} | 1 May 2003 | list |
| (169875) 2002 RF_{118} | 7 September 2002 | list |
| (175356) 2005 QK | 24 August 2005 | list |

| (178943) 2001 QA_{111} | 25 August 2001 | list |
| (181056) 2005 PX_{17} | 11 August 2005 | list^{[A]} |
| (181596) 2006 WJ_{2} | 18 November 2006 | list |
| (183154) 2002 SK_{1} | 26 September 2002 | list |
| (184999) 2006 PD | 2 August 2006 | list |
| (186938) 2004 QS | 18 August 2004 | list |
| (186939) 2004 QK_{1} | 19 August 2004 | list |
| (188890) 2006 XQ | 9 December 2006 | list |
| (190124) 2004 XR_{16} | 10 December 2004 | list |
| (198333) 2004 UA | 16 October 2004 | list |
| (200027) 2007 PM_{27} | 14 August 2007 | list |
| (208999) 2003 BC_{1} | 24 January 2003 | list |
| (212766) 2007 TK_{66} | 8 October 2007 | list |
| (214693) 2006 SX_{282} | 25 September 2006 | list |
| (216074) 2006 QE_{36} | 21 August 2006 | list |
| (221909) 2008 QY_{14} | 24 August 2008 | list |
| (224842) 2006 XN_{18} | 10 December 2006 | list |
| (228006) 2007 RL_{6} | 3 September 2007 | list |
| (233951) 2009 XJ | 7 December 2009 | list |
| (236668) 2006 PJ | 3 August 2006 | list |
| (236892) 2007 TJ_{7} | 7 October 2007 | list |
| (237261) 2008 WN_{94} | 28 November 2008 | list |
| (239286) 2007 PF_{11} | 13 August 2007 | list |
| (240771) 2005 PY_{17} | 12 August 2005 | list^{[A]} |
| (241022) 2006 QL_{31} | 22 August 2006 | list |

| (243266) 2008 AW | 4 January 2008 | list |
| (245882) 2006 QJ_{36} | 23 August 2006 | list |
| (245889) 2006 QH_{57} | 25 August 2006 | list |
| (246629) 2008 WP_{94} | 28 November 2008 | list |
| (246741) 2009 BF_{78} | 29 January 2009 | list |
| (248708) 2006 OK_{9} | 23 July 2006 | list |
| (249018) 2007 RF_{139} | 15 September 2007 | list |
| (251003) 2006 PB | 1 August 2006 | list |
| (251265) 2006 WE_{1} | 17 November 2006 | list |
| (256341) 2006 XO_{31} | 10 December 2006 | list |
| (261977) 2006 QV_{10} | 20 August 2006 | list |
| (262702) 2006 XS | 10 December 2006 | list |
| (263252) 2008 BL_{2} | 19 January 2008 | list |
| (266227) 2006 XR | 9 December 2006 | list |
| (266618) 2008 PF_{4} | 3 August 2008 | list |
| (268881) 2007 BY_{2} | 20 January 2007 | list |
| (269218) 2008 NP_{1} | 5 July 2008 | list |
| (269228) 2008 PT_{15} | 11 August 2008 | list |
| (269249) 2008 QO_{24} | 29 August 2008 | list |
| (269330) 2008 TU_{1} | 2 October 2008 | list |
| (272184) 2005 PZ_{17} | 12 August 2005 | list^{[A]} |
| (273484) 2006 YQ_{49} | 29 December 2006 | list |
| (274238) 2008 NF_{1} | 3 July 2008 | list |
| (274271) 2008 PZ_{11} | 10 August 2008 | list |
| (274272) 2008 PC_{12} | 10 August 2008 | list |

| (274295) 2008 QN_{18} | 28 August 2008 | list |
| (275239) 2009 XH | 6 December 2009 | list |
| (277533) 2005 YZ_{3} | 22 December 2005 | list |
| (278363) 2007 KE_{2} | 18 May 2007 | list |
| (278406) 2007 RV_{6} | 6 September 2007 | list |
| (281071) 2006 PM | 6 August 2006 | list |
| (281266) 2007 QF_{2} | 20 August 2007 | list |
| (281887) 2010 LR_{1} | 5 June 2010 | list |
| (283034) 2007 XG_{15} | 7 December 2007 | list |
| (283060) 2008 QF_{3} | 25 August 2008 | list |
| (284308) 2006 QG_{33} | 24 August 2006 | list |
| (288692) 2004 QJ_{1} | 19 August 2004 | list |
| (289124) 2004 UE_{1} | 17 October 2004 | list |
| (291012) 2005 YA_{4} | 22 December 2005 | list |
| (291850) 2006 OV_{4} | 22 July 2006 | list |
| (291861) 2006 PG | 2 August 2006 | list |
| (293645) 2007 PE | 4 August 2007 | list |
| (293652) 2007 PK_{9} | 12 August 2007 | list |
| (293929) 2007 TB_{4} | 6 October 2007 | list |
| (294512) 2007 XS_{10} | 5 December 2007 | list |
| (294698) 2008 BJ_{2} | 18 January 2008 | list |
| (295475) 2008 QM_{18} | 28 August 2008 | list |
| (295907) 2008 WK_{94} | 27 November 2008 | list |
| (297720) 2001 WS_{15} | 25 November 2001 | list |
| (299293) 2005 QJ | 23 August 2005 | list |

| (300290) 2007 PL_{1} | 5 August 2007 | list |
| (300425) 2007 TA_{4} | 5 October 2007 | list |
| (301121) 2008 WE_{59} | 22 November 2008 | list |
| (301268) 2009 BK_{83} | 29 January 2009 | list |
| (303711) 2005 PW_{17} | 11 August 2005 | list^{[A]} |
| (304159) 2006 PF | 2 August 2006 | list |
| (304822) 2007 RU | 2 September 2007 | list |
| (304941) 2007 TC_{4} | 6 October 2007 | list |
| (305089) 2007 VO_{2} | 2 November 2007 | list |
| (305221) 2007 XZ | 1 December 2007 | list |
| (306328) 2011 SX_{106} | 15 January 2005 | list |
| (309209) 2007 HN_{15} | 19 April 2007 | list |
| (309916) 2009 FQ_{14} | 20 March 2009 | list |
| (312223) 2007 WK_{55} | 30 November 2007 | list |
| (312226) 2007 XR_{10} | 5 December 2007 | list |
| (319463) 2006 OW_{6} | 24 July 2006 | list |
| (320628) 2008 CB_{69} | 7 February 2008 | list |
| (321027) 2008 NR_{1} | 6 July 2008 | list |
| (322540) 2011 YR_{29} | 15 September 2007 | list |
| (324334) 2006 PO | 5 August 2006 | list |
| (324350) 2006 QZ_{33} | 24 August 2006 | list |
| (324863) 2007 TC_{6} | 6 October 2007 | list |
| (324935) 2007 XC_{21} | 13 December 2007 | list |
| (327286) 2005 TQ_{46} | 1 October 2005 | list |
| (328128) 2008 BN_{2} | 19 January 2008 | list |

| (330379) 2006 XU | 10 December 2006 | list |
| (330772) 2008 TW_{1} | 3 October 2008 | list^{[A]} |
| (332379) 2007 FJ_{18} | 23 March 2007 | list |
| (333740) 2009 XB | 5 December 2009 | list |
| (335029) 2004 QU | 18 August 2004 | list |
| (336154) 2008 RL_{1} | 3 September 2008 | list |
| (336301) 2008 TV_{1} | 2 October 2008 | list |
| (339351) 2005 AH_{10} | 8 January 2005 | list |
| (339623) 2005 PA_{18} | 12 August 2005 | list^{[A]} |
| (340307) 2006 DJ | 17 February 2006 | list^{[A]} |
| (340855) 2007 AB_{8} | 11 January 2007 | list |
| (341625) 2007 VK_{1} | 2 November 2007 | list |
| (341828) 2008 BK_{2} | 18 January 2008 | list |
| (341952) 2008 PY_{11} | 10 August 2008 | list |
| (341953) 2008 PU_{15} | 11 August 2008 | list |
| (345960) 2007 TO_{3} | 5 October 2007 | list |
| (347920) 2003 BX_{46} | 24 January 2003 | list |
| (349328) 2007 VJ_{1} | 1 November 2007 | list |
| (349670) 2008 WF_{59} | 22 November 2008 | list |
| (350324) 2012 UW_{74} | 12 December 2009 | list |
| (352505) 2008 CA_{69} | 7 February 2008 | list |
| (355007) 2006 QP_{31} | 23 August 2006 | list |
| (355630) 2008 EB | 1 March 2008 | list |
| (355632) 2008 ES_{8} | 6 March 2008 | list |
| (355753) 2008 PB_{18} | 13 August 2008 | list |

| (359132) 2009 BN_{78} | 30 January 2009 | list |
| (360738) 2004 UD_{1} | 16 October 2004 | list |
| (361096) 2006 DW_{14} | 18 February 2006 | list^{[A]} |
| (361521) 2007 FG_{20} | 25 March 2007 | list |
| (361734) 2007 XQ_{10} | 5 December 2007 | list |
| (362242) 2009 KB_{8} | 28 May 2009 | list |
| (363403) 2003 OY_{7} | 26 July 2003 | list |
| (365018) 2008 PS_{15} | 11 August 2008 | list |
| (367080) 2006 QV_{4} | 19 August 2006 | list |
| (371751) 2007 FX_{1} | 18 March 2007 | list |
| (372034) 2008 RR_{22} | 5 September 2008 | list |
| (372385) 2009 QY_{9} | 22 August 2009 | list |
| (372533) 2009 TZ | 10 October 2009 | list |
| (375202) 2008 EE_{90} | 13 March 2008 | list |
| (376493) 2012 KG_{15} | 17 September 2004 | list |
| 376574 Michalkusiak | 19 January 2007 | list |
| (377473) 2005 AQ | 6 January 2005 | list |
| (378003) 2006 SW | 17 September 2006 | list |
| (378205) 2006 YP_{49} | 28 December 2006 | list |
| (378211) 2007 AK_{9} | 13 January 2007 | list |
| (378463) 2007 TN_{7} | 7 October 2007 | list |
| (379430) 2010 CF_{18} | 12 February 2010 | list |
| (388617) 2007 TO_{7} | 7 October 2007 | list |
| (388759) 2007 XD_{21} | 13 December 2007 | list |
| (388870) 2008 RN | 2 September 2008 | list |

| (392311) 2010 DH_{12} | 19 February 2010 | list |
| (394432) 2007 NC | 6 July 2007 | list |
| (395142) 2010 CG | 6 February 2010 | list |
| (395325) 2011 QZ_{2} | 20 August 2011 | list^{[A]} |
| (400244) 2007 PD_{11} | 12 August 2007 | list |
| (402373) 2005 XG_{4} | 3 December 2005 | list |
| (405565) 2005 QF_{11} | 27 August 2005 | list |
| (406389) 2007 TZ_{3} | 5 October 2007 | list |
| (416105) 2002 PA_{112} | 14 August 2002 | list |
| (418425) 2008 OR | 25 July 2008 | list |
| (424266) 2007 TW_{3} | 5 October 2007 | list |
| (424892) 2008 WH_{33} | 21 November 2008 | list |
| (429063) 2009 FK_{4} | 18 March 2009 | list |
| (431796) 2008 QR_{18} | 29 August 2008 | list |
| (432186) 2009 DH_{4} | 20 February 2009 | list |
| (438495) 2007 OY_{7} | 28 July 2007 | list |
| (444629) 2006 WD_{30} | 18 November 2006 | list |
| (452952) 2007 AC | 6 January 2007 | list |
| (457707) 2009 FJ_{14} | 19 March 2009 | list |
| (462078) 2007 FS_{4} | 18 March 2007 | list |
| (465208) 2007 PS_{28} | 15 August 2007 | list |
| (475426) 2006 PH | 2 August 2006 | list |
| (475985) 2007 PR_{27} | 14 August 2007 | list |
| (483516) 2003 PE_{12} | 7 August 2003 | list |
| (483650) 2005 AG_{10} | 7 January 2005 | list |

| (484431) 2008 AP_{29} | 12 January 2008 | list |
| (485295) 2011 AZ_{31} | 4 December 2010 | list^{[A]} |
| (522681) 2016 HM_{25} | 4 October 2008 | list^{[A]} |
| (523621) 2007 TK_{8} | 7 October 2007 | list |
| (528599) 2008 UP_{363} | 8 January 2005 | list |
| (528694) 2008 YU | 20 December 2008 | list |
| (541553) 2011 SC_{94} | 3 September 2007 | list^{[A]} |
| 542926 Manteca | 4 August 2007 | list^{[A]} |
| (543371) 2014 BZ_{50} | 25 January 2003 | list |
| (543627) 2014 OD_{125} | 7 October 2007 | list^{[A]} |
| (544535) 2014 WY_{66} | 6 November 2005 | list^{[A]} |
| (545547) 2011 QX_{2} | 20 August 2011 | list^{[A]} |
| (546273) 2010 UY_{81} | 16 October 2010 | list^{[A]} |
| (546976) 2010 CF_{12} | 12 February 2010 | list^{[A]} |
| (547169) 2010 EM_{42} | 14 March 2010 | list^{[A]} |
| (548757) 2010 VB_{92} | 4 November 2010 | list^{[A]} |
| 551233 Miguelanton | 23 August 2006 | list^{[A]} |
| 552888 Felixrodriguez | 5 November 2010 | list^{[A]} |
| (559199) 2015 BQ_{537} | 18 March 2009 | list^{[B]} |
| (565736) 2017 FH_{96} | 3 January 2004 | list |
| (566724) 2018 UH_{8} | 23 October 2004 | list |
| (569641) 2005 VZ_{2} | 6 November 2005 | list^{[A]} |
| (570579) 2006 TV_{9} | 13 October 2006 | list^{[A]} |
| (571424) 2007 PH_{11} | 12 August 2007 | list^{[A]} |
| (571431) 2007 QG_{2} | 20 August 2007 | list^{[A]} |

| (571533) 2007 TH_{7} | 7 October 2007 | list^{[A]} |
| (574022) 2009 XG_{20} | 12 December 2009 | list^{[A]} |
| (575253) 2011 QV_{2} | 20 August 2011 | list^{[A]} |
| (576549) 2012 TC_{109} | 3 September 2007 | list^{[A]} |
| (584936) 2017 SW_{41} | 19 March 2009 | list^{[B]} |
| (587651) 2006 QX_{4} | 19 August 2006 | list^{[A]} |
| (593034) 2015 FG_{258} | 13 November 2010 | list^{[A]} |
| (595913) 2004 PN_{97} | 15 August 2004 | list |
| (596297) 2005 PQ_{18} | 14 August 2005 | list^{[A]} |
| (596587) 2005 XH_{66} | 27 November 2005 | list^{[A]} |
| (596639) 2005 YJ_{181} | 23 December 2005 | list^{[A]} |
| (597146) 2006 TD_{10} | 13 October 2006 | list^{[A]} |
| (597546) 2007 NB | 6 July 2007 | list^{[A]} |
| (598351) 2008 PE_{4} | 3 August 2008 | list^{[A]} |
| (601991) 2014 AQ_{21} | 6 November 2005 | list^{[A]} |
| (607080) 1998 FS_{149} | 13 March 2010 | list^{[A]} |
| (610982) 2006 PQ | 6 August 2006 | list^{[A]} |
| (611544) 2006 YM_{2} | 16 December 2006 | list^{[A]} |
| (613750) 2007 HD_{5} | 19 April 2007 | list |
| (613767) 2007 PQ_{27} | 14 August 2007 | list |
| (617522) 2005 RW | 3 September 2005 | list^{[A]} |
| (620784) 2006 PN | 4 August 2006 | list^{[A]} |
| (621120) 2007 TE_{277} | 9 September 2007 | list^{[A]} |
| (622405) 2013 TM_{36} | 11 October 2006 | list^{[A]} |
| (624002) 2001 FL_{198} | 7 October 2007 | list^{[A]} |

| (625721) 2006 QX_{10} | 20 August 2006 | list^{[A]} |
| (625793) 2006 SS_{37} | 17 September 2006 | list^{[A]} |
| (630751) 2006 OT_{5} | 23 July 2006 | list^{[A]} |
| (633774) 2009 XE_{20} | 12 December 2009 | list^{[A]} |
| (634891) 2012 TG_{101} | 9 October 2012 | list^{[A]} |
| (635244) 2013 CE_{142} | 18 January 2008 | list^{[A]} |
| (643703) 2006 QC_{6} | 19 August 2006 | list^{[A]} |
| (643704) 2006 QD_{6} | 20 August 2006 | list^{[A]} |
| (644855) 2006 YR_{49} | 29 December 2006 | list^{[A]} |
| (645330) 2007 PG_{11} | 13 August 2007 | list^{[A]} |
| (646601) 2008 EG_{90} | 9 March 2008 | list^{[A]} |
| (647708) 2008 WG_{33} | 21 November 2008 | list^{[A]} |
| (648957) 2010 TQ_{11} | 2 October 2010 | list^{[A]} |
| (650684) 2012 TB_{101} | 8 October 2012 | list^{[A]} |
| (658486) 2017 RA_{106} | 11 October 2012 | list^{[A]} |
| (661868) 2005 RS_{9} | 4 September 2005 | list^{[A]} |
| (662612) 2006 OR_{14} | 26 July 2006 | list^{[A]} |
| (662622) 2006 QV | 7 August 2006 | list^{[A]} |
| (662623) 2006 QW_{4} | 19 August 2006 | list^{[A]} |
| (662625) 2006 QY_{10} | 21 August 2006 | list^{[A]} |
| (663489) 2007 RT | 24 August 2007 | list^{[A]} |
| (663606) 2007 TX_{3} | 5 October 2007 | list^{[A]} |
| (666331) 2010 EL_{42} | 13 March 2010 | list^{[A]} |
| (669147) 2012 TX_{118} | 9 September 2007 | list^{[A]} |
| (673130) 2015 BO_{35} | 11 December 2009 | list^{[A]} |

| (675507) 2015 XN_{171} | 6 November 2009 | list^{[A]} |
| (675591) 2015 XA_{329} | 25 October 2009 | list^{[A]} |
| (682376) 2006 QM_{40} | 25 August 2006 | list^{[A]} |
| (682702) 2006 XT | 10 December 2006 | list^{[A]} |
| (683131) 2007 PL_{9} | 12 August 2007 | list^{[A]} |
| (684192) 2008 PX_{11} | 10 August 2008 | list^{[A]} |
| (685122) 2009 FR_{29} | 20 March 2009 | list |
| (702622) 2006 QZ_{5} | 19 August 2006 | list^{[A]} |
| (703361) 2007 QR_{2} | 21 August 2007 | list^{[A]} |
| (703595) 2007 TY_{168} | 9 September 2007 | list^{[A]} |
| (704166) 2008 CR | 2 February 2008 | list^{[A]} |
| (704518) 2008 QC_{19} | 29 August 2008 | list^{[A]} |
| (705847) 2009 SN_{78} | 24 October 2004 | list |
| (711407) 2014 OG_{123} | 20 January 2007 | list^{[A]} |
| (713498) 2015 CT_{46} | 12 August 2008 | list^{[A]} |
| (725488) 2008 YC_{66} | 25 December 2008 | list^{[A]} |
| (726807) 2010 CF | 6 February 2010 | list^{[A]} |
| (729135) 2011 BY_{80} | 6 November 2009 | list^{[A]} |
| (731644) 2013 ND_{25} | 6 November 2009 | list^{[A]} |
| (739087) 2017 FT_{45} | 24 February 2012 | list^{[A]} |
| (741646) 2006 QO_{23} | 21 August 2006 | list^{[A]} |
| (742267) 2007 QP_{19} | 24 August 2007 | list^{[A]} |
| (743218) 2008 OG_{1} | 26 July 2008 | list^{[A]} |
| (743399) 2008 TV_{2} | 4 October 2008 | list^{[A]} |
| (750325) 2014 TP_{21} | 16 August 2007 | list^{[A]} |

| (754567) 2016 SM_{19} | 21 November 2008 | list^{[A]} |
| (760440) 2008 UM_{390} | 26 October 2008 | list^{[A]} |
| (775918) 2007 PN_{27} | 14 August 2007 | list^{[A]} |
| (776528) 2008 AS_{29} | 12 January 2008 | list^{[A]} |
| (795635) 2008 NQ_{1} | 6 July 2008 | list^{[A]} |
| (815246) 2009 TB_{4} | 11 October 2009 | list^{[A]} |
| (817413) 2012 MX_{6} | 23 June 2012 | list^{[A]} |
| (849077) 2005 RP_{60} | 10 September 2005 | list^{[A]} |
| (851967) 2008 NL_{3} | 12 July 2008 | list^{[A]} |
| (852013) 2008 QS_{18} | 29 August 2008 | list^{[A]} |
| (853423) 2009 FN_{4} | 19 March 2009 | list^{[B]} |
| (875499) 2004 PQ_{92} | 12 August 2004 | list |
Co-discovery made with:^{A} M. Ferrando^{B} C. Segarra
