= List of minor planets: 186001–187000 =

The following is a partial list of minor planets, running from minor-planet number 186001 through 187000, inclusive. The primary data for this and other partial lists is based on JPL's "Small-Body Orbital Elements" and data available from the Minor Planet Center. Critical list information is also provided by the MPC, unless otherwise specified from Lowell Observatory. A detailed description of the table's columns and additional sources are given on the main page including a complete list of every page in this series, and a statistical break-up on the dynamical classification of minor planets.

Also see the summary list of all named bodies in numerical and alphabetical order, and the corresponding naming citations for the number range of this particular list. New namings may only be added to this list after official publication, as the preannouncement of names is condemned by the Working Group for Small Bodies Nomenclature of the International Astronomical Union.

Near-Earth obj.	MBA (inner)	MBA (outer)	Centaur
Mars-crosser	MBA (middle)	Jupiter trojan	Trans-Neptunian obj.
Unclassified

== 186001–186100 ==
Designation			Discovery			Properties		Ref
Permanent	Provisional	Named after	Date	Site	Discoverer(s)	Category	Diam.	Ref
186001	2001 QM_{17}	—	August 16, 2001	Socorro	LINEAR	·	2.2 km	MPC · JPL
186002	2001 QO_{44}	—	August 16, 2001	Socorro	LINEAR	NYS	1.6 km	MPC · JPL
186003	2001 QD_{49}	—	August 16, 2001	Socorro	LINEAR	·	1.6 km	MPC · JPL
186004	2001 QM_{53}	—	August 16, 2001	Socorro	LINEAR	·	1.8 km	MPC · JPL
186005	2001 QW_{54}	—	August 16, 2001	Socorro	LINEAR	·	2.0 km	MPC · JPL
186006	2001 QF_{60}	—	August 18, 2001	Socorro	LINEAR	NYS	1.6 km	MPC · JPL
186007 Guilleminet	2001 QS_{100}	Guilleminet	August 18, 2001	Pises	J.-M. Lopez, J. H. Blanc	MAS	900 m	MPC · JPL
186008	2001 QG_{102}	—	August 19, 2001	Socorro	LINEAR	·	1.6 km	MPC · JPL
186009	2001 QB_{112}	—	August 24, 2001	Socorro	LINEAR	·	2.2 km	MPC · JPL
186010	2001 QR_{112}	—	August 25, 2001	Socorro	LINEAR	KON	3.7 km	MPC · JPL
186011	2001 QE_{118}	—	August 17, 2001	Socorro	LINEAR	EUN	1.3 km	MPC · JPL
186012	2001 QE_{121}	—	August 19, 2001	Socorro	LINEAR	·	1.9 km	MPC · JPL
186013	2001 QN_{122}	—	August 19, 2001	Socorro	LINEAR	·	1.7 km	MPC · JPL
186014	2001 QO_{127}	—	August 20, 2001	Socorro	LINEAR	·	2.4 km	MPC · JPL
186015	2001 QF_{131}	—	August 20, 2001	Socorro	LINEAR	·	1.8 km	MPC · JPL
186016	2001 QG_{148}	—	August 20, 2001	Palomar	NEAT	MAR	1.4 km	MPC · JPL
186017	2001 QV_{150}	—	August 23, 2001	Socorro	LINEAR	·	4.7 km	MPC · JPL
186018	2001 QZ_{157}	—	August 23, 2001	Anderson Mesa	LONEOS	NYS	1.4 km	MPC · JPL
186019	2001 QK_{163}	—	August 25, 2001	Anderson Mesa	LONEOS	·	1.6 km	MPC · JPL
186020	2001 QL_{180}	—	August 25, 2001	Palomar	NEAT	·	1.6 km	MPC · JPL
186021	2001 QD_{184}	—	August 21, 2001	Kitt Peak	Spacewatch	MAS	780 m	MPC · JPL
186022	2001 QE_{196}	—	August 22, 2001	Haleakala	NEAT	NYS	1.6 km	MPC · JPL
186023	2001 QO_{201}	—	August 22, 2001	Kitt Peak	Spacewatch	HNS	2.2 km	MPC · JPL
186024	2001 QG_{207}	—	August 23, 2001	Anderson Mesa	LONEOS	T_{j} (2.97) · 4:3	6.3 km	MPC · JPL
186025	2001 QU_{215}	—	August 23, 2001	Anderson Mesa	LONEOS	·	1.3 km	MPC · JPL
186026	2001 QZ_{229}	—	August 24, 2001	Anderson Mesa	LONEOS	EUN	2.0 km	MPC · JPL
186027	2001 QN_{245}	—	August 24, 2001	Socorro	LINEAR	·	1.4 km	MPC · JPL
186028	2001 QL_{254}	—	August 25, 2001	Anderson Mesa	LONEOS	·	1.6 km	MPC · JPL
186029	2001 QO_{273}	—	August 19, 2001	Socorro	LINEAR	·	1.9 km	MPC · JPL
186030	2001 QL_{285}	—	August 23, 2001	Haleakala	NEAT	PHO	1.6 km	MPC · JPL
186031	2001 QO_{328}	—	August 28, 2001	Palomar	NEAT	·	4.1 km	MPC · JPL
186032	2001 RA_{34}	—	September 8, 2001	Socorro	LINEAR	MAR	2.1 km	MPC · JPL
186033	2001 RZ_{44}	—	September 9, 2001	Palomar	NEAT	·	2.8 km	MPC · JPL
186034	2001 RB_{50}	—	September 10, 2001	Socorro	LINEAR	·	2.3 km	MPC · JPL
186035	2001 RX_{80}	—	September 13, 2001	Palomar	NEAT	RAF	1.5 km	MPC · JPL
186036	2001 RA_{84}	—	September 11, 2001	Anderson Mesa	LONEOS	·	1.6 km	MPC · JPL
186037	2001 RO_{99}	—	September 12, 2001	Socorro	LINEAR	·	1.6 km	MPC · JPL
186038	2001 RM_{115}	—	September 12, 2001	Socorro	LINEAR	NYS	1.5 km	MPC · JPL
186039	2001 RA_{116}	—	September 12, 2001	Socorro	LINEAR	·	2.6 km	MPC · JPL
186040	2001 RB_{123}	—	September 12, 2001	Socorro	LINEAR	·	3.0 km	MPC · JPL
186041	2001 RU_{126}	—	September 12, 2001	Socorro	LINEAR	·	1.8 km	MPC · JPL
186042	2001 RJ_{155}	—	September 12, 2001	Socorro	LINEAR	·	1.3 km	MPC · JPL
186043	2001 SA_{1}	—	September 17, 2001	Desert Eagle	W. K. Y. Yeung	·	2.2 km	MPC · JPL
186044	2001 SZ_{1}	—	September 17, 2001	Desert Eagle	W. K. Y. Yeung	EUN	2.1 km	MPC · JPL
186045	2001 SK_{13}	—	September 16, 2001	Socorro	LINEAR	MAR ·	1.5 km	MPC · JPL
186046	2001 SK_{17}	—	September 16, 2001	Socorro	LINEAR	·	2.0 km	MPC · JPL
186047	2001 SA_{18}	—	September 16, 2001	Socorro	LINEAR	MAS	1.0 km	MPC · JPL
186048	2001 SV_{23}	—	September 16, 2001	Socorro	LINEAR	·	5.5 km	MPC · JPL
186049	2001 SP_{32}	—	September 16, 2001	Socorro	LINEAR	·	1.6 km	MPC · JPL
186050	2001 SA_{40}	—	September 16, 2001	Socorro	LINEAR	DOR	5.0 km	MPC · JPL
186051	2001 SO_{50}	—	September 16, 2001	Socorro	LINEAR	slow	3.0 km	MPC · JPL
186052	2001 SX_{51}	—	September 16, 2001	Socorro	LINEAR	·	2.3 km	MPC · JPL
186053	2001 ST_{52}	—	September 16, 2001	Socorro	LINEAR	·	1.4 km	MPC · JPL
186054	2001 SC_{54}	—	September 16, 2001	Socorro	LINEAR	·	1.8 km	MPC · JPL
186055	2001 ST_{64}	—	September 17, 2001	Socorro	LINEAR	·	2.6 km	MPC · JPL
186056	2001 ST_{67}	—	September 17, 2001	Socorro	LINEAR	JUN	1.4 km	MPC · JPL
186057	2001 SF_{68}	—	September 17, 2001	Socorro	LINEAR	·	2.4 km	MPC · JPL
186058	2001 SP_{102}	—	September 20, 2001	Socorro	LINEAR	·	3.9 km	MPC · JPL
186059	2001 SA_{125}	—	September 16, 2001	Socorro	LINEAR	·	1.7 km	MPC · JPL
186060	2001 SJ_{134}	—	September 16, 2001	Socorro	LINEAR	·	2.2 km	MPC · JPL
186061	2001 SG_{135}	—	September 16, 2001	Socorro	LINEAR	·	2.5 km	MPC · JPL
186062	2001 SQ_{150}	—	September 17, 2001	Socorro	LINEAR	·	3.3 km	MPC · JPL
186063	2001 SC_{166}	—	September 19, 2001	Socorro	LINEAR	·	1.6 km	MPC · JPL
186064	2001 SS_{166}	—	September 19, 2001	Socorro	LINEAR	·	3.4 km	MPC · JPL
186065	2001 SK_{167}	—	September 19, 2001	Socorro	LINEAR	·	2.6 km	MPC · JPL
186066	2001 SA_{173}	—	September 16, 2001	Socorro	LINEAR	·	1.5 km	MPC · JPL
186067	2001 SQ_{173}	—	September 16, 2001	Socorro	LINEAR	ADE	4.1 km	MPC · JPL
186068	2001 SU_{176}	—	September 16, 2001	Socorro	LINEAR	·	2.2 km	MPC · JPL
186069	2001 SP_{177}	—	September 16, 2001	Socorro	LINEAR	EUN	1.4 km	MPC · JPL
186070	2001 SO_{192}	—	September 19, 2001	Socorro	LINEAR	·	2.0 km	MPC · JPL
186071	2001 SF_{206}	—	September 19, 2001	Socorro	LINEAR	EUN	1.3 km	MPC · JPL
186072	2001 SL_{207}	—	September 19, 2001	Socorro	LINEAR	·	1.4 km	MPC · JPL
186073	2001 SA_{216}	—	September 19, 2001	Socorro	LINEAR	·	1.5 km	MPC · JPL
186074	2001 SO_{219}	—	September 19, 2001	Socorro	LINEAR	·	1.4 km	MPC · JPL
186075	2001 SF_{221}	—	September 19, 2001	Socorro	LINEAR	·	1.4 km	MPC · JPL
186076	2001 SL_{226}	—	September 19, 2001	Socorro	LINEAR	·	2.6 km	MPC · JPL
186077	2001 SB_{227}	—	September 19, 2001	Socorro	LINEAR	(5)	1.8 km	MPC · JPL
186078	2001 SL_{227}	—	September 19, 2001	Socorro	LINEAR	·	1.2 km	MPC · JPL
186079	2001 SU_{227}	—	September 19, 2001	Socorro	LINEAR	·	2.0 km	MPC · JPL
186080	2001 SO_{230}	—	September 19, 2001	Socorro	LINEAR	·	1.3 km	MPC · JPL
186081	2001 SV_{235}	—	September 19, 2001	Socorro	LINEAR	·	3.2 km	MPC · JPL
186082	2001 SQ_{238}	—	September 19, 2001	Socorro	LINEAR	·	2.9 km	MPC · JPL
186083	2001 SU_{239}	—	September 19, 2001	Socorro	LINEAR	·	2.3 km	MPC · JPL
186084	2001 SD_{245}	—	September 19, 2001	Socorro	LINEAR	·	1.2 km	MPC · JPL
186085	2001 SZ_{247}	—	September 19, 2001	Socorro	LINEAR	·	3.2 km	MPC · JPL
186086	2001 SW_{258}	—	September 20, 2001	Socorro	LINEAR	·	1.5 km	MPC · JPL
186087	2001 SP_{259}	—	September 20, 2001	Socorro	LINEAR	MAS	1.2 km	MPC · JPL
186088	2001 SV_{276}	—	September 21, 2001	Palomar	NEAT	EUN	2.3 km	MPC · JPL
186089	2001 SM_{288}	—	September 28, 2001	Palomar	NEAT	(194)	3.2 km	MPC · JPL
186090	2001 SS_{293}	—	September 19, 2001	Socorro	LINEAR	·	2.3 km	MPC · JPL
186091	2001 SD_{295}	—	September 20, 2001	Socorro	LINEAR	·	3.6 km	MPC · JPL
186092	2001 SK_{303}	—	September 20, 2001	Socorro	LINEAR	·	1.7 km	MPC · JPL
186093	2001 SD_{313}	—	September 21, 2001	Socorro	LINEAR	·	1.9 km	MPC · JPL
186094	2001 SG_{336}	—	September 20, 2001	Socorro	LINEAR	·	1.8 km	MPC · JPL
186095	2001 SV_{345}	—	September 23, 2001	Palomar	NEAT	·	2.6 km	MPC · JPL
186096	2001 SQ_{353}	—	September 25, 2001	Socorro	LINEAR	EUN	2.2 km	MPC · JPL
186097	2001 SG_{354}	—	September 18, 2001	Anderson Mesa	LONEOS	·	1.8 km	MPC · JPL
186098	2001 TR_{2}	—	October 6, 2001	Palomar	NEAT	·	2.8 km	MPC · JPL
186099	2001 TY_{18}	—	October 13, 2001	Uenohara	Uenohara	·	1.4 km	MPC · JPL
186100	2001 TN_{25}	—	October 14, 2001	Socorro	LINEAR	·	1.6 km	MPC · JPL

== 186101–186200 ==
back to top

Designation			Discovery			Properties		Ref
Permanent	Provisional	Named after	Date	Site	Discoverer(s)	Category	Diam.	Ref
186101	2001 TU_{31}	—	October 14, 2001	Socorro	LINEAR	·	2.8 km	MPC · JPL
186102	2001 TB_{37}	—	October 14, 2001	Socorro	LINEAR	·	3.7 km	MPC · JPL
186103	2001 TQ_{38}	—	October 14, 2001	Socorro	LINEAR	BAR	2.2 km	MPC · JPL
186104	2001 TZ_{48}	—	October 15, 2001	Socorro	LINEAR	H	1.1 km	MPC · JPL
186105	2001 TF_{52}	—	October 13, 2001	Socorro	LINEAR	·	4.0 km	MPC · JPL
186106	2001 TW_{56}	—	October 14, 2001	Socorro	LINEAR	L5 · fast	10 km	MPC · JPL
186107	2001 TG_{71}	—	October 13, 2001	Socorro	LINEAR	·	3.6 km	MPC · JPL
186108	2001 TB_{72}	—	October 13, 2001	Socorro	LINEAR	DOR	4.3 km	MPC · JPL
186109	2001 TH_{80}	—	October 13, 2001	Socorro	LINEAR	·	5.7 km	MPC · JPL
186110	2001 TB_{82}	—	October 14, 2001	Socorro	LINEAR	·	2.9 km	MPC · JPL
186111	2001 TV_{92}	—	October 14, 2001	Socorro	LINEAR	·	3.0 km	MPC · JPL
186112	2001 TR_{95}	—	October 14, 2001	Socorro	LINEAR	·	1.3 km	MPC · JPL
186113	2001 TP_{100}	—	October 14, 2001	Socorro	LINEAR	·	2.4 km	MPC · JPL
186114	2001 TC_{109}	—	October 14, 2001	Socorro	LINEAR	·	4.6 km	MPC · JPL
186115	2001 TL_{113}	—	October 14, 2001	Socorro	LINEAR	·	2.4 km	MPC · JPL
186116	2001 TV_{126}	—	October 13, 2001	Kitt Peak	Spacewatch	·	2.1 km	MPC · JPL
186117	2001 TC_{128}	—	October 10, 2001	Palomar	NEAT	(5)	2.2 km	MPC · JPL
186118	2001 TG_{138}	—	October 10, 2001	Palomar	NEAT	·	3.1 km	MPC · JPL
186119	2001 TG_{139}	—	October 10, 2001	Palomar	NEAT	·	1.7 km	MPC · JPL
186120	2001 TM_{140}	—	October 10, 2001	Palomar	NEAT	·	1.6 km	MPC · JPL
186121	2001 TU_{143}	—	October 10, 2001	Palomar	NEAT	DOR	3.4 km	MPC · JPL
186122	2001 TH_{145}	—	October 10, 2001	Palomar	NEAT	·	1.8 km	MPC · JPL
186123	2001 TW_{146}	—	October 10, 2001	Palomar	NEAT	·	1.8 km	MPC · JPL
186124	2001 TF_{148}	—	October 10, 2001	Palomar	NEAT	·	2.1 km	MPC · JPL
186125	2001 TM_{150}	—	October 10, 2001	Palomar	NEAT	L5	10 km	MPC · JPL
186126	2001 TT_{150}	—	October 10, 2001	Palomar	NEAT	·	2.5 km	MPC · JPL
186127	2001 TM_{152}	—	October 10, 2001	Palomar	NEAT	·	1.7 km	MPC · JPL
186128	2001 TP_{154}	—	October 15, 2001	Palomar	NEAT	L5	14 km	MPC · JPL
186129	2001 TO_{159}	—	October 11, 2001	Palomar	NEAT	·	1.7 km	MPC · JPL
186130	2001 TL_{162}	—	October 11, 2001	Palomar	NEAT	·	2.0 km	MPC · JPL
186131	2001 TJ_{164}	—	October 11, 2001	Palomar	NEAT	·	2.3 km	MPC · JPL
186132	2001 TC_{165}	—	October 15, 2001	Haleakala	NEAT	EUN	2.3 km	MPC · JPL
186133	2001 TF_{165}	—	October 15, 2001	Palomar	NEAT	·	3.1 km	MPC · JPL
186134	2001 TM_{171}	—	October 15, 2001	Palomar	NEAT	RAF	1.4 km	MPC · JPL
186135	2001 TN_{192}	—	October 14, 2001	Socorro	LINEAR	·	4.1 km	MPC · JPL
186136	2001 TG_{196}	—	October 14, 2001	Palomar	NEAT	·	2.8 km	MPC · JPL
186137	2001 TZ_{204}	—	October 11, 2001	Socorro	LINEAR	·	2.5 km	MPC · JPL
186138	2001 TK_{206}	—	October 11, 2001	Palomar	NEAT	L5	10 km	MPC · JPL
186139	2001 TE_{207}	—	October 11, 2001	Palomar	NEAT	·	1.8 km	MPC · JPL
186140	2001 TX_{214}	—	October 13, 2001	Palomar	NEAT	·	2.9 km	MPC · JPL
186141	2001 TO_{217}	—	October 14, 2001	Socorro	LINEAR	·	2.5 km	MPC · JPL
186142 Gillespie	2001 TO_{245}	Gillespie	October 14, 2001	Apache Point	SDSS	·	2.3 km	MPC · JPL
186143	2001 TB_{257}	—	October 15, 2001	Kitt Peak	Spacewatch	·	1.9 km	MPC · JPL
186144	2001 UN_{9}	—	October 17, 2001	Socorro	LINEAR	GEF	1.9 km	MPC · JPL
186145	2001 US_{10}	—	October 21, 2001	Desert Eagle	W. K. Y. Yeung	·	2.5 km	MPC · JPL
186146	2001 US_{19}	—	October 17, 2001	Kitt Peak	Spacewatch	(5)	1.2 km	MPC · JPL
186147	2001 UL_{20}	—	October 17, 2001	Palomar	NEAT	·	1.9 km	MPC · JPL
186148	2001 UA_{29}	—	October 16, 2001	Socorro	LINEAR	·	2.8 km	MPC · JPL
186149	2001 UE_{37}	—	October 16, 2001	Socorro	LINEAR	·	3.9 km	MPC · JPL
186150	2001 UP_{38}	—	October 17, 2001	Socorro	LINEAR	·	2.1 km	MPC · JPL
186151	2001 UW_{56}	—	October 17, 2001	Socorro	LINEAR	·	1.6 km	MPC · JPL
186152	2001 UL_{61}	—	October 17, 2001	Socorro	LINEAR	·	2.0 km	MPC · JPL
186153	2001 UN_{66}	—	October 18, 2001	Socorro	LINEAR	H	1.6 km	MPC · JPL
186154	2001 UW_{99}	—	October 17, 2001	Socorro	LINEAR	·	3.4 km	MPC · JPL
186155	2001 UX_{102}	—	October 20, 2001	Socorro	LINEAR	·	1.8 km	MPC · JPL
186156	2001 UD_{105}	—	October 20, 2001	Socorro	LINEAR	·	2.5 km	MPC · JPL
186157	2001 UH_{106}	—	October 20, 2001	Socorro	LINEAR	NEM	2.8 km	MPC · JPL
186158	2001 UF_{107}	—	October 20, 2001	Socorro	LINEAR	KON ·	2.6 km	MPC · JPL
186159	2001 US_{110}	—	October 21, 2001	Socorro	LINEAR	·	1.9 km	MPC · JPL
186160	2001 UL_{116}	—	October 22, 2001	Socorro	LINEAR	·	2.3 km	MPC · JPL
186161	2001 UW_{120}	—	October 22, 2001	Socorro	LINEAR	·	1.7 km	MPC · JPL
186162	2001 UT_{130}	—	October 20, 2001	Socorro	LINEAR	·	2.3 km	MPC · JPL
186163	2001 UP_{133}	—	October 21, 2001	Socorro	LINEAR	·	2.8 km	MPC · JPL
186164	2001 UT_{133}	—	October 21, 2001	Socorro	LINEAR	·	1.9 km	MPC · JPL
186165	2001 UG_{134}	—	October 21, 2001	Socorro	LINEAR	HNS	1.5 km	MPC · JPL
186166	2001 UK_{137}	—	October 23, 2001	Socorro	LINEAR	·	2.1 km	MPC · JPL
186167	2001 US_{137}	—	October 23, 2001	Socorro	LINEAR	·	1.8 km	MPC · JPL
186168	2001 UO_{139}	—	October 23, 2001	Socorro	LINEAR	·	1.7 km	MPC · JPL
186169	2001 UQ_{143}	—	October 23, 2001	Socorro	LINEAR	·	2.0 km	MPC · JPL
186170	2001 UY_{143}	—	October 23, 2001	Socorro	LINEAR	·	4.3 km	MPC · JPL
186171	2001 UY_{148}	—	October 23, 2001	Socorro	LINEAR	·	1.6 km	MPC · JPL
186172	2001 UR_{150}	—	October 23, 2001	Socorro	LINEAR	·	1.9 km	MPC · JPL
186173	2001 UZ_{155}	—	October 23, 2001	Socorro	LINEAR	·	2.7 km	MPC · JPL
186174	2001 UL_{165}	—	October 23, 2001	Palomar	NEAT	·	1.7 km	MPC · JPL
186175	2001 UY_{166}	—	October 24, 2001	Kitt Peak	Spacewatch	·	2.0 km	MPC · JPL
186176	2001 UL_{172}	—	October 18, 2001	Palomar	NEAT	·	2.2 km	MPC · JPL
186177	2001 UH_{175}	—	October 24, 2001	Palomar	NEAT	·	1.9 km	MPC · JPL
186178	2001 UT_{184}	—	October 16, 2001	Palomar	NEAT	·	1.4 km	MPC · JPL
186179	2001 UA_{197}	—	October 19, 2001	Anderson Mesa	LONEOS	·	3.7 km	MPC · JPL
186180	2001 UZ_{203}	—	October 19, 2001	Palomar	NEAT	·	2.4 km	MPC · JPL
186181	2001 UK_{204}	—	October 19, 2001	Palomar	NEAT	·	2.3 km	MPC · JPL
186182	2001 UU_{208}	—	October 20, 2001	Socorro	LINEAR	·	2.2 km	MPC · JPL
186183	2001 UZ_{227}	—	October 19, 2001	Palomar	NEAT	·	2.1 km	MPC · JPL
186184	2001 VT	—	November 6, 2001	Socorro	LINEAR	·	2.3 km	MPC · JPL
186185	2001 VH_{8}	—	November 9, 2001	Socorro	LINEAR	·	5.3 km	MPC · JPL
186186	2001 VV_{8}	—	November 9, 2001	Socorro	LINEAR	MIS ·	3.8 km	MPC · JPL
186187	2001 VX_{31}	—	November 9, 2001	Socorro	LINEAR	·	3.6 km	MPC · JPL
186188	2001 VU_{48}	—	November 9, 2001	Socorro	LINEAR	JUN	2.2 km	MPC · JPL
186189	2001 VM_{54}	—	November 10, 2001	Socorro	LINEAR	·	2.0 km	MPC · JPL
186190	2001 VX_{75}	—	November 15, 2001	Kitt Peak	Spacewatch	·	1.8 km	MPC · JPL
186191	2001 VX_{86}	—	November 15, 2001	Socorro	LINEAR	·	3.0 km	MPC · JPL
186192	2001 VD_{89}	—	November 12, 2001	Socorro	LINEAR	·	4.2 km	MPC · JPL
186193	2001 VF_{90}	—	November 15, 2001	Socorro	LINEAR	fast	2.6 km	MPC · JPL
186194	2001 VH_{91}	—	November 15, 2001	Socorro	LINEAR	MAR	1.6 km	MPC · JPL
186195	2001 VB_{94}	—	November 15, 2001	Socorro	LINEAR	·	2.3 km	MPC · JPL
186196	2001 VU_{96}	—	November 15, 2001	Socorro	LINEAR	ADE	5.0 km	MPC · JPL
186197	2001 VQ_{104}	—	November 12, 2001	Socorro	LINEAR	·	3.1 km	MPC · JPL
186198	2001 VP_{111}	—	November 12, 2001	Socorro	LINEAR	HOF	3.6 km	MPC · JPL
186199	2001 VT_{121}	—	November 15, 2001	Palomar	NEAT	EUN	1.9 km	MPC · JPL
186200	2001 VJ_{124}	—	November 9, 2001	Socorro	LINEAR	·	1.9 km	MPC · JPL

== 186201–186300 ==
back to top

Designation			Discovery			Properties		Ref
Permanent	Provisional	Named after	Date	Site	Discoverer(s)	Category	Diam.	Ref
186201	2001 VP_{124}	—	November 9, 2001	Socorro	LINEAR	AGN	1.8 km	MPC · JPL
186202	2001 VZ_{124}	—	November 11, 2001	Socorro	LINEAR	ADE	4.2 km	MPC · JPL
186203	2001 WL_{8}	—	November 17, 2001	Socorro	LINEAR	·	2.8 km	MPC · JPL
186204	2001 WT_{14}	—	November 17, 2001	Kitt Peak	Spacewatch	EUN	2.7 km	MPC · JPL
186205	2001 WF_{25}	—	November 17, 2001	Socorro	LINEAR	·	3.0 km	MPC · JPL
186206	2001 WL_{25}	—	November 17, 2001	Socorro	LINEAR	(17392)	1.9 km	MPC · JPL
186207	2001 WQ_{26}	—	November 17, 2001	Socorro	LINEAR	·	1.9 km	MPC · JPL
186208	2001 WX_{26}	—	November 17, 2001	Socorro	LINEAR	·	2.3 km	MPC · JPL
186209	2001 WT_{34}	—	November 17, 2001	Socorro	LINEAR	·	1.3 km	MPC · JPL
186210	2001 WH_{35}	—	November 17, 2001	Socorro	LINEAR	·	3.9 km	MPC · JPL
186211	2001 WJ_{37}	—	November 17, 2001	Socorro	LINEAR	(5)	1.7 km	MPC · JPL
186212	2001 WZ_{37}	—	November 17, 2001	Socorro	LINEAR	·	3.4 km	MPC · JPL
186213	2001 WA_{43}	—	November 18, 2001	Socorro	LINEAR	·	2.2 km	MPC · JPL
186214	2001 WW_{47}	—	November 19, 2001	Anderson Mesa	LONEOS	HNS	2.0 km	MPC · JPL
186215	2001 WE_{48}	—	November 19, 2001	Anderson Mesa	LONEOS	·	2.9 km	MPC · JPL
186216	2001 WM_{48}	—	November 19, 2001	Anderson Mesa	LONEOS	·	4.1 km	MPC · JPL
186217	2001 WN_{48}	—	November 19, 2001	Anderson Mesa	LONEOS	HNS	2.0 km	MPC · JPL
186218	2001 WP_{60}	—	November 19, 2001	Socorro	LINEAR	·	1.9 km	MPC · JPL
186219	2001 WQ_{63}	—	November 19, 2001	Socorro	LINEAR	·	2.6 km	MPC · JPL
186220	2001 WS_{77}	—	November 20, 2001	Socorro	LINEAR	·	2.5 km	MPC · JPL
186221	2001 WC_{79}	—	November 20, 2001	Socorro	LINEAR	·	2.4 km	MPC · JPL
186222	2001 WA_{81}	—	November 20, 2001	Socorro	LINEAR	WIT	1.1 km	MPC · JPL
186223	2001 WN_{83}	—	November 20, 2001	Socorro	LINEAR	·	2.8 km	MPC · JPL
186224	2001 WF_{87}	—	November 19, 2001	Socorro	LINEAR	(5)	1.9 km	MPC · JPL
186225	2001 WP_{87}	—	November 19, 2001	Socorro	LINEAR	·	2.7 km	MPC · JPL
186226	2001 WC_{102}	—	November 18, 2001	Kitt Peak	Spacewatch	·	3.5 km	MPC · JPL
186227	2001 XN_{10}	—	December 9, 2001	Socorro	LINEAR	·	2.2 km	MPC · JPL
186228	2001 XK_{41}	—	December 9, 2001	Socorro	LINEAR	·	3.4 km	MPC · JPL
186229	2001 XF_{43}	—	December 9, 2001	Socorro	LINEAR	JUN	1.9 km	MPC · JPL
186230	2001 XW_{82}	—	December 11, 2001	Socorro	LINEAR	·	3.8 km	MPC · JPL
186231	2001 XK_{83}	—	December 11, 2001	Socorro	LINEAR	·	2.2 km	MPC · JPL
186232	2001 XX_{83}	—	December 11, 2001	Socorro	LINEAR	BRA	2.4 km	MPC · JPL
186233	2001 XU_{84}	—	December 11, 2001	Socorro	LINEAR	·	3.2 km	MPC · JPL
186234	2001 XP_{93}	—	December 10, 2001	Socorro	LINEAR	·	1.9 km	MPC · JPL
186235	2001 XS_{102}	—	December 13, 2001	Socorro	LINEAR	H	840 m	MPC · JPL
186236	2001 XO_{121}	—	December 14, 2001	Socorro	LINEAR	·	2.8 km	MPC · JPL
186237	2001 XC_{124}	—	December 14, 2001	Socorro	LINEAR	·	2.6 km	MPC · JPL
186238	2001 XJ_{139}	—	December 14, 2001	Socorro	LINEAR	·	2.7 km	MPC · JPL
186239	2001 XP_{140}	—	December 14, 2001	Socorro	LINEAR	·	2.2 km	MPC · JPL
186240	2001 XS_{143}	—	December 14, 2001	Socorro	LINEAR	·	1.9 km	MPC · JPL
186241	2001 XZ_{146}	—	December 14, 2001	Socorro	LINEAR	·	3.5 km	MPC · JPL
186242	2001 XB_{156}	—	December 14, 2001	Socorro	LINEAR	KOR	2.1 km	MPC · JPL
186243	2001 XZ_{157}	—	December 14, 2001	Socorro	LINEAR	EUN	2.0 km	MPC · JPL
186244	2001 XQ_{163}	—	December 14, 2001	Socorro	LINEAR	·	3.2 km	MPC · JPL
186245	2001 XA_{165}	—	December 14, 2001	Socorro	LINEAR	·	2.6 km	MPC · JPL
186246	2001 XD_{170}	—	December 14, 2001	Socorro	LINEAR	·	4.1 km	MPC · JPL
186247	2001 XY_{191}	—	December 14, 2001	Socorro	LINEAR	·	3.3 km	MPC · JPL
186248	2001 XS_{203}	—	December 11, 2001	Socorro	LINEAR	MRX	1.8 km	MPC · JPL
186249	2001 XV_{208}	—	December 11, 2001	Socorro	LINEAR	·	2.5 km	MPC · JPL
186250	2001 XJ_{213}	—	December 11, 2001	Socorro	LINEAR	·	3.1 km	MPC · JPL
186251	2001 XH_{219}	—	December 15, 2001	Socorro	LINEAR	KOR	1.9 km	MPC · JPL
186252	2001 XF_{222}	—	December 15, 2001	Socorro	LINEAR	·	1.6 km	MPC · JPL
186253	2001 XN_{234}	—	December 15, 2001	Socorro	LINEAR	AGN	1.9 km	MPC · JPL
186254	2001 XK_{241}	—	December 14, 2001	Socorro	LINEAR	·	2.1 km	MPC · JPL
186255	2001 XV_{249}	—	December 14, 2001	Socorro	LINEAR	PAD	2.6 km	MPC · JPL
186256	2001 XV_{250}	—	December 14, 2001	Socorro	LINEAR	·	3.0 km	MPC · JPL
186257	2001 YR_{4}	—	December 23, 2001	Kingsnake	J. V. McClusky	·	2.9 km	MPC · JPL
186258	2001 YE_{9}	—	December 17, 2001	Socorro	LINEAR	·	3.1 km	MPC · JPL
186259	2001 YV_{12}	—	December 17, 2001	Socorro	LINEAR	·	2.2 km	MPC · JPL
186260	2001 YZ_{18}	—	December 17, 2001	Socorro	LINEAR	·	3.0 km	MPC · JPL
186261	2001 YD_{22}	—	December 18, 2001	Socorro	LINEAR	GEF	2.1 km	MPC · JPL
186262	2001 YA_{36}	—	December 18, 2001	Socorro	LINEAR	·	2.5 km	MPC · JPL
186263	2001 YL_{44}	—	December 18, 2001	Socorro	LINEAR	·	6.0 km	MPC · JPL
186264	2001 YT_{65}	—	December 18, 2001	Socorro	LINEAR	·	4.1 km	MPC · JPL
186265	2001 YS_{67}	—	December 18, 2001	Socorro	LINEAR	·	2.8 km	MPC · JPL
186266	2001 YF_{97}	—	December 17, 2001	Socorro	LINEAR	·	3.1 km	MPC · JPL
186267	2001 YB_{101}	—	December 17, 2001	Socorro	LINEAR	·	3.1 km	MPC · JPL
186268	2001 YU_{114}	—	December 19, 2001	Palomar	NEAT	·	4.0 km	MPC · JPL
186269	2001 YC_{132}	—	December 19, 2001	Socorro	LINEAR	GAL	2.3 km	MPC · JPL
186270	2001 YR_{137}	—	December 22, 2001	Socorro	LINEAR	·	2.9 km	MPC · JPL
186271	2001 YU_{138}	—	December 20, 2001	Kitt Peak	Spacewatch	·	2.1 km	MPC · JPL
186272	2001 YZ_{140}	—	December 17, 2001	Socorro	LINEAR	L5	11 km	MPC · JPL
186273	2001 YE_{154}	—	December 19, 2001	Palomar	NEAT	·	2.7 km	MPC · JPL
186274	2002 AY_{4}	—	January 3, 2002	Cima Ekar	ADAS	·	2.9 km	MPC · JPL
186275	2002 AK_{31}	—	January 11, 2002	Socorro	LINEAR	·	5.5 km	MPC · JPL
186276	2002 AW_{48}	—	January 9, 2002	Socorro	LINEAR	·	3.0 km	MPC · JPL
186277	2002 AR_{57}	—	January 9, 2002	Socorro	LINEAR	·	3.6 km	MPC · JPL
186278	2002 AY_{96}	—	January 8, 2002	Socorro	LINEAR	ADE	2.9 km	MPC · JPL
186279	2002 AN_{103}	—	January 9, 2002	Socorro	LINEAR	·	3.6 km	MPC · JPL
186280	2002 AW_{108}	—	January 9, 2002	Socorro	LINEAR	·	2.8 km	MPC · JPL
186281	2002 AZ_{129}	—	January 15, 2002	Kingsnake	J. V. McClusky	H	850 m	MPC · JPL
186282	2002 AQ_{148}	—	January 11, 2002	Socorro	LINEAR	·	5.2 km	MPC · JPL
186283	2002 AT_{155}	—	January 14, 2002	Socorro	LINEAR	AEG	5.3 km	MPC · JPL
186284	2002 AT_{158}	—	January 13, 2002	Socorro	LINEAR	·	3.1 km	MPC · JPL
186285	2002 AP_{165}	—	January 13, 2002	Socorro	LINEAR	·	3.7 km	MPC · JPL
186286	2002 AA_{177}	—	January 14, 2002	Socorro	LINEAR	·	3.9 km	MPC · JPL
186287	2002 AU_{187}	—	January 8, 2002	Haleakala	NEAT	·	4.0 km	MPC · JPL
186288	2002 BS_{3}	—	January 18, 2002	Anderson Mesa	LONEOS	·	4.2 km	MPC · JPL
186289	2002 BB_{19}	—	January 21, 2002	Socorro	LINEAR	·	6.8 km	MPC · JPL
186290	2002 BZ_{24}	—	January 23, 2002	Socorro	LINEAR	AGN	1.8 km	MPC · JPL
186291	2002 BT_{28}	—	January 19, 2002	Anderson Mesa	LONEOS	·	2.6 km	MPC · JPL
186292	2002 CN_{41}	—	February 7, 2002	Palomar	NEAT	·	5.6 km	MPC · JPL
186293	2002 CL_{47}	—	February 3, 2002	Haleakala	NEAT	·	2.6 km	MPC · JPL
186294	2002 CP_{62}	—	February 6, 2002	Socorro	LINEAR	·	3.1 km	MPC · JPL
186295	2002 CM_{74}	—	February 7, 2002	Socorro	LINEAR	·	3.1 km	MPC · JPL
186296	2002 CV_{80}	—	February 7, 2002	Socorro	LINEAR	·	3.0 km	MPC · JPL
186297	2002 CV_{89}	—	February 7, 2002	Socorro	LINEAR	·	2.9 km	MPC · JPL
186298	2002 CG_{93}	—	February 7, 2002	Socorro	LINEAR	EOS	3.1 km	MPC · JPL
186299	2002 CA_{100}	—	February 7, 2002	Socorro	LINEAR	·	4.0 km	MPC · JPL
186300	2002 CV_{100}	—	February 7, 2002	Socorro	LINEAR	·	3.4 km	MPC · JPL

== 186301–186400 ==
back to top

Designation			Discovery			Properties		Ref
Permanent	Provisional	Named after	Date	Site	Discoverer(s)	Category	Diam.	Ref
186301	2002 CG_{103}	—	February 7, 2002	Socorro	LINEAR	·	4.7 km	MPC · JPL
186302	2002 CC_{117}	—	February 14, 2002	Needville	Needville	·	4.3 km	MPC · JPL
186303	2002 CV_{124}	—	February 7, 2002	Socorro	LINEAR	·	3.1 km	MPC · JPL
186304	2002 CQ_{125}	—	February 7, 2002	Socorro	LINEAR	·	6.7 km	MPC · JPL
186305	2002 CQ_{128}	—	February 7, 2002	Socorro	LINEAR	KOR	2.1 km	MPC · JPL
186306	2002 CH_{136}	—	February 8, 2002	Socorro	LINEAR	·	3.8 km	MPC · JPL
186307	2002 CQ_{161}	—	February 8, 2002	Socorro	LINEAR	·	3.3 km	MPC · JPL
186308	2002 CL_{184}	—	February 10, 2002	Socorro	LINEAR	·	2.4 km	MPC · JPL
186309	2002 CJ_{190}	—	February 10, 2002	Socorro	LINEAR	THM	3.0 km	MPC · JPL
186310	2002 CX_{190}	—	February 10, 2002	Socorro	LINEAR	·	3.3 km	MPC · JPL
186311	2002 CD_{204}	—	February 10, 2002	Socorro	LINEAR	EOS	2.9 km	MPC · JPL
186312	2002 CZ_{204}	—	February 10, 2002	Socorro	LINEAR	EOS	2.8 km	MPC · JPL
186313	2002 CY_{216}	—	February 10, 2002	Socorro	LINEAR	·	2.8 km	MPC · JPL
186314	2002 CP_{224}	—	February 11, 2002	Socorro	LINEAR	·	3.1 km	MPC · JPL
186315	2002 CZ_{234}	—	February 10, 2002	Kitt Peak	Spacewatch	THM	3.1 km	MPC · JPL
186316	2002 CA_{237}	—	February 10, 2002	Socorro	LINEAR	·	3.6 km	MPC · JPL
186317	2002 CF_{256}	—	February 4, 2002	Palomar	NEAT	·	2.0 km	MPC · JPL
186318	2002 CS_{256}	—	February 4, 2002	Palomar	NEAT	·	2.7 km	MPC · JPL
186319	2002 CS_{267}	—	February 7, 2002	Kitt Peak	Spacewatch	·	3.7 km	MPC · JPL
186320	2002 CF_{273}	—	February 8, 2002	Socorro	LINEAR	·	3.5 km	MPC · JPL
186321	2002 CZ_{274}	—	February 8, 2002	Socorro	LINEAR	·	5.4 km	MPC · JPL
186322	2002 CG_{289}	—	February 10, 2002	Socorro	LINEAR	·	3.0 km	MPC · JPL
186323	2002 DH_{3}	—	February 21, 2002	Socorro	LINEAR	·	4.0 km	MPC · JPL
186324	2002 DF_{4}	—	February 21, 2002	Socorro	LINEAR	H	1.2 km	MPC · JPL
186325	2002 DC_{9}	—	February 19, 2002	Socorro	LINEAR	THB	3.9 km	MPC · JPL
186326	2002 DO_{12}	—	February 22, 2002	Palomar	NEAT	·	4.4 km	MPC · JPL
186327	2002 DO_{16}	—	February 20, 2002	Socorro	LINEAR	·	5.3 km	MPC · JPL
186328	2002 DN_{17}	—	February 19, 2002	Kitt Peak	Spacewatch	·	2.8 km	MPC · JPL
186329	2002 DO_{18}	—	February 21, 2002	Socorro	LINEAR	TIR	4.0 km	MPC · JPL
186330	2002 EX_{15}	—	March 6, 2002	Palomar	NEAT	·	6.1 km	MPC · JPL
186331	2002 EU_{20}	—	March 9, 2002	Socorro	LINEAR	·	6.0 km	MPC · JPL
186332	2002 EL_{21}	—	March 10, 2002	Palomar	NEAT	EOS	3.7 km	MPC · JPL
186333	2002 EN_{23}	—	March 5, 2002	Kitt Peak	Spacewatch	THM	2.9 km	MPC · JPL
186334	2002 EV_{31}	—	March 9, 2002	Palomar	NEAT	THM	2.6 km	MPC · JPL
186335	2002 EJ_{33}	—	March 11, 2002	Palomar	NEAT	·	3.9 km	MPC · JPL
186336	2002 EC_{36}	—	March 9, 2002	Kitt Peak	Spacewatch	EMA	5.3 km	MPC · JPL
186337	2002 ED_{37}	—	March 9, 2002	Kitt Peak	Spacewatch	EOS	2.4 km	MPC · JPL
186338	2002 EO_{42}	—	March 12, 2002	Socorro	LINEAR	THM	3.4 km	MPC · JPL
186339	2002 EC_{53}	—	March 12, 2002	Socorro	LINEAR	EOS	2.8 km	MPC · JPL
186340	2002 EO_{58}	—	March 13, 2002	Socorro	LINEAR	·	4.4 km	MPC · JPL
186341	2002 EC_{75}	—	March 13, 2002	Socorro	LINEAR	(895)	7.0 km	MPC · JPL
186342	2002 EA_{79}	—	March 10, 2002	Haleakala	NEAT	·	6.3 km	MPC · JPL
186343	2002 EA_{80}	—	March 12, 2002	Palomar	NEAT	·	3.5 km	MPC · JPL
186344	2002 ER_{101}	—	March 6, 2002	Socorro	LINEAR	EOS	3.0 km	MPC · JPL
186345	2002 EM_{110}	—	March 9, 2002	Catalina	CSS	·	5.0 km	MPC · JPL
186346	2002 EK_{112}	—	March 10, 2002	Kitt Peak	Spacewatch	EOS	2.3 km	MPC · JPL
186347	2002 EY_{141}	—	March 12, 2002	Palomar	NEAT	·	4.2 km	MPC · JPL
186348	2002 ED_{143}	—	March 12, 2002	Palomar	NEAT	(43176)	3.9 km	MPC · JPL
186349	2002 EQ_{150}	—	March 15, 2002	Palomar	NEAT	·	4.3 km	MPC · JPL
186350	2002 EL_{161}	—	March 6, 2002	Palomar	NEAT	·	3.4 km	MPC · JPL
186351	2002 FB_{4}	—	March 20, 2002	Desert Eagle	W. K. Y. Yeung	·	4.9 km	MPC · JPL
186352	2002 FJ_{15}	—	March 16, 2002	Haleakala	NEAT	·	6.5 km	MPC · JPL
186353	2002 FQ_{20}	—	March 18, 2002	Haleakala	NEAT	·	4.4 km	MPC · JPL
186354	2002 FX_{25}	—	March 19, 2002	Palomar	NEAT	·	4.1 km	MPC · JPL
186355	2002 FM_{30}	—	March 20, 2002	Palomar	NEAT	·	3.8 km	MPC · JPL
186356	2002 GX_{2}	—	April 5, 2002	Palomar	NEAT	EUP	6.0 km	MPC · JPL
186357	2002 GW_{12}	—	April 14, 2002	Socorro	LINEAR	VER	6.3 km	MPC · JPL
186358	2002 GT_{45}	—	April 4, 2002	Haleakala	NEAT	·	5.3 km	MPC · JPL
186359	2002 GU_{48}	—	April 4, 2002	Palomar	NEAT	·	4.4 km	MPC · JPL
186360	2002 GU_{54}	—	April 5, 2002	Palomar	NEAT	·	3.4 km	MPC · JPL
186361	2002 GK_{55}	—	April 5, 2002	Palomar	NEAT	·	9.1 km	MPC · JPL
186362	2002 GR_{72}	—	April 9, 2002	Anderson Mesa	LONEOS	·	5.4 km	MPC · JPL
186363	2002 GE_{77}	—	April 9, 2002	Anderson Mesa	LONEOS	·	7.4 km	MPC · JPL
186364	2002 GQ_{97}	—	April 9, 2002	Kitt Peak	Spacewatch	VER	6.3 km	MPC · JPL
186365	2002 GN_{103}	—	April 10, 2002	Socorro	LINEAR	·	6.0 km	MPC · JPL
186366	2002 GA_{107}	—	April 11, 2002	Anderson Mesa	LONEOS	HYG	5.1 km	MPC · JPL
186367	2002 GX_{107}	—	April 11, 2002	Socorro	LINEAR	·	5.7 km	MPC · JPL
186368	2002 GW_{108}	—	April 11, 2002	Palomar	NEAT	·	5.8 km	MPC · JPL
186369	2002 GG_{113}	—	April 11, 2002	Anderson Mesa	LONEOS	HYG	5.2 km	MPC · JPL
186370	2002 GX_{121}	—	April 10, 2002	Socorro	LINEAR	·	5.5 km	MPC · JPL
186371	2002 GN_{125}	—	April 12, 2002	Socorro	LINEAR	·	5.8 km	MPC · JPL
186372	2002 GF_{145}	—	April 12, 2002	Socorro	LINEAR	·	6.2 km	MPC · JPL
186373	2002 GF_{148}	—	April 14, 2002	Socorro	LINEAR	HYG	3.7 km	MPC · JPL
186374	2002 GR_{159}	—	April 14, 2002	Socorro	LINEAR	EUP	6.3 km	MPC · JPL
186375	2002 GV_{162}	—	April 14, 2002	Palomar	NEAT	·	1.0 km	MPC · JPL
186376	2002 GT_{163}	—	April 14, 2002	Palomar	NEAT	·	5.3 km	MPC · JPL
186377	2002 GD_{164}	—	April 14, 2002	Palomar	NEAT	·	3.6 km	MPC · JPL
186378	2002 GW_{170}	—	April 10, 2002	Socorro	LINEAR	·	6.2 km	MPC · JPL
186379	2002 GE_{176}	—	April 12, 2002	Socorro	LINEAR	·	6.0 km	MPC · JPL
186380	2002 HN_{5}	—	April 17, 2002	Socorro	LINEAR	·	7.0 km	MPC · JPL
186381	2002 HG_{15}	—	April 17, 2002	Socorro	LINEAR	·	3.9 km	MPC · JPL
186382	2002 JZ_{3}	—	May 5, 2002	Socorro	LINEAR	·	5.9 km	MPC · JPL
186383	2002 JX_{40}	—	May 8, 2002	Socorro	LINEAR	·	6.5 km	MPC · JPL
186384	2002 JD_{82}	—	May 11, 2002	Socorro	LINEAR	VER	5.5 km	MPC · JPL
186385	2002 JX_{98}	—	May 13, 2002	Palomar	NEAT	·	5.5 km	MPC · JPL
186386	2002 JG_{108}	—	May 14, 2002	Palomar	NEAT	·	7.4 km	MPC · JPL
186387	2002 JP_{108}	—	May 14, 2002	Palomar	NEAT	·	5.5 km	MPC · JPL
186388	2002 JB_{116}	—	May 5, 2002	Palomar	NEAT	·	5.0 km	MPC · JPL
186389	2002 JL_{117}	—	May 4, 2002	Palomar	NEAT	LUT	7.5 km	MPC · JPL
186390	2002 JM_{117}	—	May 4, 2002	Palomar	NEAT	·	7.2 km	MPC · JPL
186391	2002 LG_{17}	—	June 6, 2002	Socorro	LINEAR	·	1.5 km	MPC · JPL
186392	2002 NB_{37}	—	July 9, 2002	Socorro	LINEAR	·	1.3 km	MPC · JPL
186393	2002 NR_{39}	—	July 14, 2002	Socorro	LINEAR	·	980 m	MPC · JPL
186394	2002 NG_{51}	—	July 5, 2002	Socorro	LINEAR	·	770 m	MPC · JPL
186395	2002 NG_{62}	—	July 5, 2002	Palomar	NEAT	·	810 m	MPC · JPL
186396	2002 OG_{30}	—	July 23, 2002	Palomar	NEAT	·	1.0 km	MPC · JPL
186397	2002 PG_{4}	—	August 4, 2002	Palomar	NEAT	·	1.1 km	MPC · JPL
186398	2002 PN_{29}	—	August 6, 2002	Palomar	NEAT	·	1.1 km	MPC · JPL
186399	2002 PC_{45}	—	August 5, 2002	Socorro	LINEAR	·	2.0 km	MPC · JPL
186400	2002 PJ_{46}	—	August 9, 2002	Socorro	LINEAR	·	1.4 km	MPC · JPL

== 186401–186500 ==
back to top

Designation			Discovery			Properties		Ref
Permanent	Provisional	Named after	Date	Site	Discoverer(s)	Category	Diam.	Ref
186401	2002 PR_{59}	—	August 10, 2002	Socorro	LINEAR	·	1.1 km	MPC · JPL
186402	2002 PS_{61}	—	August 11, 2002	Socorro	LINEAR	·	1.2 km	MPC · JPL
186403	2002 PQ_{62}	—	August 8, 2002	Palomar	NEAT	·	980 m	MPC · JPL
186404	2002 PU_{67}	—	August 6, 2002	Palomar	NEAT	ERI	2.2 km	MPC · JPL
186405	2002 PE_{70}	—	August 11, 2002	Socorro	LINEAR	·	1.6 km	MPC · JPL
186406	2002 PO_{83}	—	August 10, 2002	Socorro	LINEAR	·	1.9 km	MPC · JPL
186407	2002 PM_{115}	—	August 12, 2002	Socorro	LINEAR	·	2.4 km	MPC · JPL
186408	2002 PD_{126}	—	August 14, 2002	Socorro	LINEAR	·	1.0 km	MPC · JPL
186409	2002 PO_{129}	—	August 15, 2002	Palomar	NEAT	·	1.0 km	MPC · JPL
186410	2002 PG_{135}	—	August 14, 2002	Socorro	LINEAR	·	1.4 km	MPC · JPL
186411 Margaretsimon	2002 PF_{152}	Margaretsimon	August 10, 2002	Cerro Tololo	M. W. Buie	·	950 m	MPC · JPL
186412	2002 PE_{160}	—	August 8, 2002	Palomar	S. F. Hönig	·	870 m	MPC · JPL
186413	2002 QU_{48}	—	August 29, 2002	Palomar	R. Matson	·	950 m	MPC · JPL
186414	2002 QH_{57}	—	August 17, 2002	Palomar	Lowe, A.	·	920 m	MPC · JPL
186415	2002 QB_{91}	—	August 30, 2002	Palomar	NEAT	·	1.2 km	MPC · JPL
186416	2002 QQ_{99}	—	August 18, 2002	Palomar	NEAT	·	1.2 km	MPC · JPL
186417	2002 QM_{117}	—	August 16, 2002	Palomar	NEAT	·	1.1 km	MPC · JPL
186418	2002 RA	—	September 1, 2002	Anderson Mesa	LONEOS	·	1.4 km	MPC · JPL
186419	2002 RR_{2}	—	September 4, 2002	Anderson Mesa	LONEOS	·	1.1 km	MPC · JPL
186420	2002 RG_{6}	—	September 1, 2002	Haleakala	NEAT	·	980 m	MPC · JPL
186421	2002 RZ_{6}	—	September 2, 2002	Kvistaberg	Uppsala-DLR Asteroid Survey	·	2.0 km	MPC · JPL
186422	2002 RD_{14}	—	September 4, 2002	Anderson Mesa	LONEOS	·	1.0 km	MPC · JPL
186423	2002 RJ_{19}	—	September 4, 2002	Anderson Mesa	LONEOS	·	2.4 km	MPC · JPL
186424	2002 RA_{24}	—	September 4, 2002	Anderson Mesa	LONEOS	NYS	1.3 km	MPC · JPL
186425	2002 RX_{34}	—	September 4, 2002	Anderson Mesa	LONEOS	·	1.8 km	MPC · JPL
186426	2002 RE_{51}	—	September 5, 2002	Socorro	LINEAR	·	1.2 km	MPC · JPL
186427	2002 RB_{77}	—	September 5, 2002	Socorro	LINEAR	·	1.2 km	MPC · JPL
186428	2002 RE_{86}	—	September 5, 2002	Socorro	LINEAR	·	2.1 km	MPC · JPL
186429	2002 RK_{91}	—	September 5, 2002	Socorro	LINEAR	·	1.4 km	MPC · JPL
186430	2002 RK_{92}	—	September 5, 2002	Socorro	LINEAR	NYS	1.7 km	MPC · JPL
186431	2002 RG_{98}	—	September 5, 2002	Socorro	LINEAR	·	1.8 km	MPC · JPL
186432	2002 RJ_{104}	—	September 5, 2002	Socorro	LINEAR	NYS	1.6 km	MPC · JPL
186433	2002 RA_{115}	—	September 6, 2002	Socorro	LINEAR	·	1.9 km	MPC · JPL
186434	2002 RS_{119}	—	September 7, 2002	Socorro	LINEAR	·	1.5 km	MPC · JPL
186435	2002 RU_{124}	—	September 9, 2002	Palomar	NEAT	slow	1.2 km	MPC · JPL
186436	2002 RG_{137}	—	September 12, 2002	Goodricke-Pigott	R. A. Tucker	·	1.5 km	MPC · JPL
186437	2002 RE_{139}	—	September 10, 2002	Palomar	NEAT	·	1.9 km	MPC · JPL
186438	2002 RN_{200}	—	September 13, 2002	Anderson Mesa	LONEOS	·	1.2 km	MPC · JPL
186439	2002 RF_{217}	—	September 14, 2002	Palomar	NEAT	·	950 m	MPC · JPL
186440	2002 RE_{245}	—	September 3, 2002	Haleakala	NEAT	·	1.2 km	MPC · JPL
186441	2002 RY_{263}	—	September 14, 2002	Haleakala	NEAT	·	1.1 km	MPC · JPL
186442	2002 SK_{11}	—	September 27, 2002	Palomar	NEAT	·	1.1 km	MPC · JPL
186443	2002 SC_{12}	—	September 27, 2002	Palomar	NEAT	·	2.0 km	MPC · JPL
186444	2002 SP_{18}	—	September 26, 2002	Palomar	NEAT	V	990 m	MPC · JPL
186445	2002 SP_{22}	—	September 26, 2002	Palomar	NEAT	MAS	1.1 km	MPC · JPL
186446	2002 SM_{30}	—	September 28, 2002	Haleakala	NEAT	·	3.1 km	MPC · JPL
186447	2002 SP_{34}	—	September 29, 2002	Haleakala	NEAT	·	1.4 km	MPC · JPL
186448	2002 SK_{40}	—	September 30, 2002	Haleakala	NEAT	3:2	7.1 km	MPC · JPL
186449	2002 SA_{43}	—	September 28, 2002	Haleakala	NEAT	NYS	1.6 km	MPC · JPL
186450	2002 SO_{43}	—	September 28, 2002	Haleakala	NEAT	·	2.0 km	MPC · JPL
186451	2002 SJ_{45}	—	September 29, 2002	Haleakala	NEAT	V	1.3 km	MPC · JPL
186452	2002 SP_{49}	—	September 30, 2002	Socorro	LINEAR	NYS	1.4 km	MPC · JPL
186453	2002 SU_{51}	—	September 17, 2002	Palomar	NEAT	V	1.1 km	MPC · JPL
186454	2002 SU_{55}	—	September 30, 2002	Socorro	LINEAR	·	1.4 km	MPC · JPL
186455	2002 SS_{56}	—	September 30, 2002	Socorro	LINEAR	·	2.1 km	MPC · JPL
186456	2002 SE_{57}	—	September 30, 2002	Socorro	LINEAR	·	2.1 km	MPC · JPL
186457	2002 SU_{57}	—	September 30, 2002	Haleakala	NEAT	V	1.0 km	MPC · JPL
186458	2002 SQ_{59}	—	September 16, 2002	Haleakala	NEAT	V	1.0 km	MPC · JPL
186459	2002 SF_{60}	—	September 16, 2002	Palomar	NEAT	·	950 m	MPC · JPL
186460	2002 SX_{71}	—	September 30, 2002	Haleakala	NEAT	·	2.1 km	MPC · JPL
186461	2002 TZ_{2}	—	October 1, 2002	Anderson Mesa	LONEOS	·	1.6 km	MPC · JPL
186462	2002 TE_{5}	—	October 1, 2002	Socorro	LINEAR	ERI	2.1 km	MPC · JPL
186463	2002 TD_{10}	—	October 1, 2002	Socorro	LINEAR	·	1.7 km	MPC · JPL
186464	2002 TB_{14}	—	October 1, 2002	Socorro	LINEAR	V	1.1 km	MPC · JPL
186465	2002 TG_{22}	—	October 2, 2002	Socorro	LINEAR	·	1.8 km	MPC · JPL
186466	2002 TE_{31}	—	October 2, 2002	Socorro	LINEAR	·	1.8 km	MPC · JPL
186467	2002 TX_{40}	—	October 2, 2002	Socorro	LINEAR	·	1.4 km	MPC · JPL
186468	2002 TO_{42}	—	October 2, 2002	Socorro	LINEAR	·	1.8 km	MPC · JPL
186469	2002 TP_{45}	—	October 2, 2002	Socorro	LINEAR	·	2.1 km	MPC · JPL
186470	2002 TQ_{45}	—	October 2, 2002	Socorro	LINEAR	·	1.9 km	MPC · JPL
186471	2002 TN_{49}	—	October 2, 2002	Socorro	LINEAR	·	1.4 km	MPC · JPL
186472	2002 TY_{50}	—	October 2, 2002	Socorro	LINEAR	·	1.6 km	MPC · JPL
186473	2002 TH_{58}	—	October 1, 2002	Anderson Mesa	LONEOS	·	1.5 km	MPC · JPL
186474	2002 TN_{58}	—	October 1, 2002	Črni Vrh	Mikuž, H.	V	1.1 km	MPC · JPL
186475	2002 TO_{65}	—	October 5, 2002	Anderson Mesa	LONEOS	·	1.1 km	MPC · JPL
186476	2002 TT_{65}	—	October 3, 2002	Socorro	LINEAR	·	1 km	MPC · JPL
186477	2002 TV_{73}	—	October 3, 2002	Palomar	NEAT	·	2.0 km	MPC · JPL
186478	2002 TX_{76}	—	October 1, 2002	Anderson Mesa	LONEOS	·	1.3 km	MPC · JPL
186479	2002 TO_{78}	—	October 1, 2002	Socorro	LINEAR	·	2.3 km	MPC · JPL
186480	2002 TX_{84}	—	October 2, 2002	Haleakala	NEAT	·	2.4 km	MPC · JPL
186481	2002 TY_{87}	—	October 3, 2002	Socorro	LINEAR	·	1.6 km	MPC · JPL
186482	2002 TX_{107}	—	October 1, 2002	Anderson Mesa	LONEOS	·	1.3 km	MPC · JPL
186483	2002 TX_{108}	—	October 1, 2002	Haleakala	NEAT	·	1.3 km	MPC · JPL
186484	2002 TE_{109}	—	October 1, 2002	Črni Vrh	Mikuž, H.	V	1.2 km	MPC · JPL
186485	2002 TQ_{124}	—	October 4, 2002	Socorro	LINEAR	·	1.5 km	MPC · JPL
186486	2002 TQ_{129}	—	October 4, 2002	Palomar	NEAT	HNS	1.9 km	MPC · JPL
186487	2002 TZ_{181}	—	October 3, 2002	Socorro	LINEAR	(2076)	1.4 km	MPC · JPL
186488	2002 TH_{195}	—	October 3, 2002	Socorro	LINEAR	·	1.6 km	MPC · JPL
186489	2002 TP_{208}	—	October 4, 2002	Socorro	LINEAR	ERI	2.2 km	MPC · JPL
186490	2002 TB_{222}	—	October 7, 2002	Socorro	LINEAR	·	1.1 km	MPC · JPL
186491	2002 TE_{226}	—	October 8, 2002	Anderson Mesa	LONEOS	·	2.9 km	MPC · JPL
186492	2002 TZ_{245}	—	October 9, 2002	Anderson Mesa	LONEOS	·	2.1 km	MPC · JPL
186493	2002 TL_{265}	—	October 10, 2002	Socorro	LINEAR	·	1.6 km	MPC · JPL
186494	2002 TO_{277}	—	October 10, 2002	Palomar	NEAT	NYS	2.4 km	MPC · JPL
186495	2002 TB_{287}	—	October 10, 2002	Socorro	LINEAR	V	1.4 km	MPC · JPL
186496	2002 TY_{299}	—	October 15, 2002	Palomar	NEAT	·	1.3 km	MPC · JPL
186497	2002 TC_{300}	—	October 15, 2002	Palomar	NEAT	·	1.5 km	MPC · JPL
186498	2002 TE_{303}	—	October 11, 2002	Socorro	LINEAR	·	1.6 km	MPC · JPL
186499	2002 TD_{343}	—	October 5, 2002	Apache Point	SDSS	·	1.7 km	MPC · JPL
186500	2002 TR_{357}	—	October 10, 2002	Apache Point	SDSS	NYS	1.0 km	MPC · JPL

== 186501–186600 ==
back to top

Designation			Discovery			Properties		Ref
Permanent	Provisional	Named after	Date	Site	Discoverer(s)	Category	Diam.	Ref
186501	2002 UY	—	October 25, 2002	Palomar	NEAT	·	1.5 km	MPC · JPL
186502	2002 UL_{6}	—	October 28, 2002	Palomar	NEAT	·	1.8 km	MPC · JPL
186503	2002 UH_{15}	—	October 30, 2002	Palomar	NEAT	·	1.1 km	MPC · JPL
186504	2002 UX_{15}	—	October 30, 2002	Palomar	NEAT	·	1.8 km	MPC · JPL
186505	2002 UB_{19}	—	October 30, 2002	Palomar	NEAT	·	1.2 km	MPC · JPL
186506	2002 UK_{28}	—	October 30, 2002	Palomar	NEAT	·	2.1 km	MPC · JPL
186507	2002 UE_{59}	—	October 29, 2002	Apache Point	SDSS	V	760 m	MPC · JPL
186508	2002 UO_{59}	—	October 29, 2002	Apache Point	SDSS	·	1.1 km	MPC · JPL
186509	2002 VG_{2}	—	November 2, 2002	Haleakala	NEAT	·	2.0 km	MPC · JPL
186510	2002 VA_{8}	—	November 1, 2002	Palomar	NEAT	·	1.9 km	MPC · JPL
186511	2002 VE_{12}	—	November 2, 2002	Palomar	NEAT	NYS	1.3 km	MPC · JPL
186512	2002 VA_{23}	—	November 5, 2002	Socorro	LINEAR	NYS	1.2 km	MPC · JPL
186513	2002 VZ_{23}	—	November 5, 2002	Socorro	LINEAR	(5)	1.7 km	MPC · JPL
186514	2002 VC_{24}	—	November 5, 2002	Socorro	LINEAR	NYS	1.5 km	MPC · JPL
186515	2002 VN_{26}	—	November 5, 2002	Socorro	LINEAR	NYS	1.5 km	MPC · JPL
186516	2002 VH_{31}	—	November 5, 2002	Socorro	LINEAR	·	2.1 km	MPC · JPL
186517	2002 VM_{32}	—	November 5, 2002	Socorro	LINEAR	·	1.4 km	MPC · JPL
186518	2002 VZ_{34}	—	November 5, 2002	Kitt Peak	Spacewatch	·	1.8 km	MPC · JPL
186519	2002 VZ_{37}	—	November 5, 2002	Socorro	LINEAR	·	2.1 km	MPC · JPL
186520	2002 VU_{38}	—	November 5, 2002	Socorro	LINEAR	·	2.1 km	MPC · JPL
186521	2002 VV_{43}	—	November 4, 2002	Palomar	NEAT	·	1.6 km	MPC · JPL
186522	2002 VG_{45}	—	November 5, 2002	Socorro	LINEAR	·	3.9 km	MPC · JPL
186523	2002 VZ_{48}	—	November 5, 2002	Anderson Mesa	LONEOS	·	1.9 km	MPC · JPL
186524	2002 VU_{50}	—	November 6, 2002	Anderson Mesa	LONEOS	·	1.2 km	MPC · JPL
186525	2002 VG_{56}	—	November 6, 2002	Anderson Mesa	LONEOS	V	1.2 km	MPC · JPL
186526	2002 VK_{56}	—	November 6, 2002	Anderson Mesa	LONEOS	PHO	1.6 km	MPC · JPL
186527	2002 VL_{59}	—	November 3, 2002	Haleakala	NEAT	(2076)	2.1 km	MPC · JPL
186528	2002 VN_{65}	—	November 7, 2002	Socorro	LINEAR	·	2.7 km	MPC · JPL
186529	2002 VO_{67}	—	November 7, 2002	Socorro	LINEAR	MAS	1.2 km	MPC · JPL
186530	2002 VX_{78}	—	November 7, 2002	Socorro	LINEAR	CLA	2.9 km	MPC · JPL
186531	2002 VD_{80}	—	November 7, 2002	Socorro	LINEAR	V	900 m	MPC · JPL
186532	2002 VV_{84}	—	November 7, 2002	Socorro	LINEAR	(5)	2.1 km	MPC · JPL
186533	2002 VR_{86}	—	November 8, 2002	Socorro	LINEAR	·	1.8 km	MPC · JPL
186534	2002 VX_{88}	—	November 11, 2002	Anderson Mesa	LONEOS	·	2.4 km	MPC · JPL
186535	2002 VM_{101}	—	November 11, 2002	Socorro	LINEAR	·	1.7 km	MPC · JPL
186536	2002 VQ_{105}	—	November 12, 2002	Socorro	LINEAR	·	2.1 km	MPC · JPL
186537	2002 VZ_{108}	—	November 12, 2002	Socorro	LINEAR	·	2.3 km	MPC · JPL
186538	2002 VP_{109}	—	November 12, 2002	Socorro	LINEAR	·	2.0 km	MPC · JPL
186539	2002 VR_{114}	—	November 13, 2002	Palomar	NEAT	NYS	2.7 km	MPC · JPL
186540	2002 VO_{127}	—	November 15, 2002	Socorro	LINEAR	NYS	1.8 km	MPC · JPL
186541	2002 WJ_{1}	—	November 23, 2002	Palomar	NEAT	·	1.7 km	MPC · JPL
186542	2002 WA_{11}	—	November 25, 2002	Palomar	NEAT	·	2.3 km	MPC · JPL
186543	2002 WU_{15}	—	November 28, 2002	Anderson Mesa	LONEOS	V	990 m	MPC · JPL
186544	2002 WT_{23}	—	November 24, 2002	Palomar	NEAT	L5	12 km	MPC · JPL
186545	2002 XY_{3}	—	December 2, 2002	Socorro	LINEAR	·	1.2 km	MPC · JPL
186546	2002 XL_{6}	—	December 1, 2002	Haleakala	NEAT	MAS	1.2 km	MPC · JPL
186547	2002 XM_{8}	—	December 2, 2002	Socorro	LINEAR	·	1.6 km	MPC · JPL
186548	2002 XQ_{8}	—	December 2, 2002	Socorro	LINEAR	MAS	1.2 km	MPC · JPL
186549	2002 XM_{9}	—	December 2, 2002	Socorro	LINEAR	·	2.0 km	MPC · JPL
186550	2002 XP_{10}	—	December 3, 2002	Palomar	NEAT	(5)	2.2 km	MPC · JPL
186551	2002 XQ_{11}	—	December 3, 2002	Palomar	NEAT	·	3.4 km	MPC · JPL
186552	2002 XJ_{13}	—	December 3, 2002	Haleakala	NEAT	V · slow	1.2 km	MPC · JPL
186553	2002 XA_{26}	—	December 5, 2002	Socorro	LINEAR	MAS	960 m	MPC · JPL
186554	2002 XW_{28}	—	December 5, 2002	Socorro	LINEAR	(5)	1.6 km	MPC · JPL
186555	2002 XD_{33}	—	December 6, 2002	Socorro	LINEAR	·	1.7 km	MPC · JPL
186556	2002 XB_{54}	—	December 10, 2002	Socorro	LINEAR	·	2.7 km	MPC · JPL
186557	2002 XK_{55}	—	December 10, 2002	Palomar	NEAT	(5)	1.9 km	MPC · JPL
186558	2002 XW_{92}	—	December 5, 2002	Socorro	LINEAR	MAR	1.6 km	MPC · JPL
186559	2002 YD_{1}	—	December 27, 2002	Anderson Mesa	LONEOS	JUN	2.4 km	MPC · JPL
186560	2002 YR_{6}	—	December 28, 2002	Anderson Mesa	LONEOS	·	2.0 km	MPC · JPL
186561	2002 YA_{7}	—	December 28, 2002	Kitt Peak	Spacewatch	·	2.0 km	MPC · JPL
186562	2002 YZ_{10}	—	December 31, 2002	Socorro	LINEAR	·	2.0 km	MPC · JPL
186563	2002 YY_{12}	—	December 31, 2002	Socorro	LINEAR	(5)	2.3 km	MPC · JPL
186564	2002 YX_{13}	—	December 31, 2002	Socorro	LINEAR	·	1.5 km	MPC · JPL
186565	2002 YQ_{16}	—	December 31, 2002	Socorro	LINEAR	·	1.9 km	MPC · JPL
186566	2002 YL_{19}	—	December 31, 2002	Socorro	LINEAR	·	2.5 km	MPC · JPL
186567	2002 YG_{25}	—	December 31, 2002	Socorro	LINEAR	·	2.3 km	MPC · JPL
186568	2002 YP_{27}	—	December 31, 2002	Socorro	LINEAR	·	1.9 km	MPC · JPL
186569	2002 YR_{27}	—	December 31, 2002	Socorro	LINEAR	·	2.0 km	MPC · JPL
186570	2002 YX_{27}	—	December 31, 2002	Socorro	LINEAR	·	2.5 km	MPC · JPL
186571	2003 AM_{7}	—	January 2, 2003	Socorro	LINEAR	·	2.3 km	MPC · JPL
186572	2003 AW_{11}	—	January 1, 2003	Socorro	LINEAR	EUN	2.0 km	MPC · JPL
186573	2003 AG_{22}	—	January 5, 2003	Socorro	LINEAR	·	2.0 km	MPC · JPL
186574	2003 AY_{41}	—	January 7, 2003	Socorro	LINEAR	·	5.2 km	MPC · JPL
186575	2003 AA_{46}	—	January 5, 2003	Socorro	LINEAR	·	2.8 km	MPC · JPL
186576	2003 AL_{46}	—	January 5, 2003	Socorro	LINEAR	·	1.9 km	MPC · JPL
186577	2003 AE_{52}	—	January 5, 2003	Socorro	LINEAR	·	1.7 km	MPC · JPL
186578	2003 AN_{56}	—	January 5, 2003	Socorro	LINEAR	·	2.2 km	MPC · JPL
186579	2003 AL_{57}	—	January 5, 2003	Socorro	LINEAR	·	3.9 km	MPC · JPL
186580	2003 AE_{62}	—	January 8, 2003	Socorro	LINEAR	·	2.7 km	MPC · JPL
186581	2003 AS_{68}	—	January 9, 2003	Socorro	LINEAR	·	2.1 km	MPC · JPL
186582	2003 AK_{69}	—	January 7, 2003	Socorro	LINEAR	·	2.5 km	MPC · JPL
186583	2003 AO_{69}	—	January 7, 2003	Socorro	LINEAR	·	4.1 km	MPC · JPL
186584	2003 AS_{69}	—	January 8, 2003	Socorro	LINEAR	·	2.0 km	MPC · JPL
186585	2003 AE_{75}	—	January 10, 2003	Socorro	LINEAR	·	3.4 km	MPC · JPL
186586	2003 AK_{78}	—	January 10, 2003	Socorro	LINEAR	·	3.0 km	MPC · JPL
186587	2003 AZ_{79}	—	January 12, 2003	Socorro	LINEAR	·	3.3 km	MPC · JPL
186588	2003 AE_{85}	—	January 8, 2003	Socorro	LINEAR	PHO	1.6 km	MPC · JPL
186589	2003 BJ_{2}	—	January 25, 2003	Palomar	NEAT	·	2.9 km	MPC · JPL
186590	2003 BJ_{20}	—	January 27, 2003	Socorro	LINEAR	·	3.0 km	MPC · JPL
186591	2003 BZ_{23}	—	January 25, 2003	Palomar	NEAT	EUN	1.6 km	MPC · JPL
186592	2003 BH_{25}	—	January 25, 2003	Palomar	NEAT	H	1.0 km	MPC · JPL
186593	2003 BB_{26}	—	January 26, 2003	Palomar	NEAT	·	1.8 km	MPC · JPL
186594	2003 BP_{35}	—	January 28, 2003	Palomar	NEAT	·	3.3 km	MPC · JPL
186595	2003 BS_{57}	—	January 27, 2003	Socorro	LINEAR	·	2.9 km	MPC · JPL
186596	2003 BX_{57}	—	January 27, 2003	Socorro	LINEAR	·	3.2 km	MPC · JPL
186597	2003 BJ_{62}	—	January 28, 2003	Palomar	NEAT	·	3.0 km	MPC · JPL
186598	2003 BD_{70}	—	January 30, 2003	Anderson Mesa	LONEOS	·	1.9 km	MPC · JPL
186599	2003 BO_{71}	—	January 28, 2003	Socorro	LINEAR	·	2.5 km	MPC · JPL
186600	2003 BN_{82}	—	January 31, 2003	Socorro	LINEAR	·	2.7 km	MPC · JPL

== 186601–186700 ==
back to top

Designation			Discovery			Properties		Ref
Permanent	Provisional	Named after	Date	Site	Discoverer(s)	Category	Diam.	Ref
186601	2003 BN_{86}	—	January 25, 2003	Socorro	LINEAR	EUN	1.6 km	MPC · JPL
186602	2003 BY_{89}	—	January 28, 2003	Socorro	LINEAR	·	3.7 km	MPC · JPL
186603	2003 BF_{90}	—	January 28, 2003	Socorro	LINEAR	·	3.3 km	MPC · JPL
186604	2003 BP_{92}	—	January 28, 2003	Apache Point	SDSS	DOR	2.9 km	MPC · JPL
186605	2003 CN_{1}	—	February 1, 2003	Palomar	NEAT	·	5.4 km	MPC · JPL
186606	2003 CB_{15}	—	February 4, 2003	Socorro	LINEAR	·	2.2 km	MPC · JPL
186607	2003 CZ_{15}	—	February 4, 2003	Palomar	NEAT	·	3.7 km	MPC · JPL
186608	2003 CK_{18}	—	February 8, 2003	Socorro	LINEAR	·	5.4 km	MPC · JPL
186609	2003 DA_{22}	—	February 28, 2003	Socorro	LINEAR	·	4.2 km	MPC · JPL
186610	2003 EF_{7}	—	March 6, 2003	Anderson Mesa	LONEOS	PAD	2.6 km	MPC · JPL
186611	2003 EH_{14}	—	March 7, 2003	Palomar	NEAT	·	2.6 km	MPC · JPL
186612	2003 EJ_{21}	—	March 6, 2003	Socorro	LINEAR	·	3.3 km	MPC · JPL
186613	2003 EM_{25}	—	March 6, 2003	Anderson Mesa	LONEOS	·	3.3 km	MPC · JPL
186614	2003 EY_{31}	—	March 7, 2003	Socorro	LINEAR	·	3.1 km	MPC · JPL
186615	2003 EF_{34}	—	March 7, 2003	Socorro	LINEAR	·	4.4 km	MPC · JPL
186616	2003 EL_{39}	—	March 8, 2003	Socorro	LINEAR	THB	4.1 km	MPC · JPL
186617	2003 EZ_{51}	—	March 11, 2003	Palomar	NEAT	·	2.4 km	MPC · JPL
186618	2003 EC_{56}	—	March 11, 2003	Kitt Peak	Spacewatch	DOR	3.4 km	MPC · JPL
186619	2003 FU_{33}	—	March 23, 2003	Kitt Peak	Spacewatch	HOF	3.4 km	MPC · JPL
186620	2003 FY_{37}	—	March 23, 2003	Kitt Peak	Spacewatch	H	750 m	MPC · JPL
186621	2003 FD_{41}	—	March 25, 2003	Palomar	NEAT	·	2.9 km	MPC · JPL
186622	2003 FQ_{45}	—	March 24, 2003	Kitt Peak	Spacewatch	·	2.6 km	MPC · JPL
186623	2003 FG_{52}	—	March 25, 2003	Palomar	NEAT	CLO	4.2 km	MPC · JPL
186624	2003 FL_{96}	—	March 30, 2003	Kitt Peak	Spacewatch	·	4.1 km	MPC · JPL
186625	2003 FQ_{103}	—	March 24, 2003	Kitt Peak	Spacewatch	BRA	2.3 km	MPC · JPL
186626	2003 FA_{105}	—	March 26, 2003	Palomar	NEAT	·	3.3 km	MPC · JPL
186627	2003 FY_{107}	—	March 31, 2003	Anderson Mesa	LONEOS	·	5.8 km	MPC · JPL
186628	2003 FO_{112}	—	March 31, 2003	Socorro	LINEAR	·	3.6 km	MPC · JPL
186629	2003 FN_{130}	—	March 24, 2003	Kitt Peak	Spacewatch	·	2.8 km	MPC · JPL
186630	2003 GB_{37}	—	April 6, 2003	Anderson Mesa	LONEOS	·	2.8 km	MPC · JPL
186631	2003 GA_{41}	—	April 9, 2003	Palomar	NEAT	BRA	2.2 km	MPC · JPL
186632	2003 GF_{41}	—	April 9, 2003	Palomar	NEAT	PAD	3.0 km	MPC · JPL
186633	2003 GP_{44}	—	April 9, 2003	Haleakala	NEAT	·	2.8 km	MPC · JPL
186634	2003 GA_{45}	—	April 8, 2003	Palomar	NEAT	VER	5.1 km	MPC · JPL
186635	2003 GW_{54}	—	April 4, 2003	Kitt Peak	Spacewatch	EOS	3.0 km	MPC · JPL
186636	2003 HE_{50}	—	April 28, 2003	Socorro	LINEAR	·	6.0 km	MPC · JPL
186637	2003 HQ_{53}	—	April 21, 2003	Kitt Peak	Spacewatch	H	660 m	MPC · JPL
186638	2003 JJ_{4}	—	May 2, 2003	Kitt Peak	Spacewatch	H	850 m	MPC · JPL
186639	2003 KP_{8}	—	May 23, 2003	Kitt Peak	Spacewatch	·	4.5 km	MPC · JPL
186640	2003 KR_{16}	—	May 27, 2003	Haleakala	NEAT	·	4.6 km	MPC · JPL
186641	2003 LL_{4}	—	June 3, 2003	Socorro	LINEAR	·	4.7 km	MPC · JPL
186642	2003 MK_{7}	—	June 29, 2003	Socorro	LINEAR	·	5.6 km	MPC · JPL
186643	2003 MS_{7}	—	June 28, 2003	Prescott	P. G. Comba	·	3.8 km	MPC · JPL
186644	2003 ML_{8}	—	June 28, 2003	Socorro	LINEAR	·	5.3 km	MPC · JPL
186645	2003 NW_{8}	—	July 10, 2003	Reedy Creek	J. Broughton	·	3.5 km	MPC · JPL
186646	2003 QW_{64}	—	August 23, 2003	Socorro	LINEAR	T_{j} (2.95) · HIL · slow	8.6 km	MPC · JPL
186647	2003 RB_{11}	—	September 13, 2003	Anderson Mesa	LONEOS	·	5.0 km	MPC · JPL
186648	2003 SN_{115}	—	September 16, 2003	Socorro	LINEAR	H	900 m	MPC · JPL
186649	2003 TK_{15}	—	October 15, 2003	Anderson Mesa	LONEOS	T_{j} (2.97) · 3:2	8.9 km	MPC · JPL
186650	2003 UN_{74}	—	October 17, 2003	Kitt Peak	Spacewatch	·	960 m	MPC · JPL
186651	2003 UX_{85}	—	October 18, 2003	Palomar	NEAT	·	980 m	MPC · JPL
186652	2003 UY_{106}	—	October 18, 2003	Palomar	NEAT	·	1.0 km	MPC · JPL
186653	2003 UP_{164}	—	October 21, 2003	Socorro	LINEAR	MAS	1.4 km	MPC · JPL
186654	2003 WZ_{65}	—	November 19, 2003	Kitt Peak	Spacewatch	·	740 m	MPC · JPL
186655	2003 WY_{86}	—	November 21, 2003	Socorro	LINEAR	·	890 m	MPC · JPL
186656	2003 WA_{104}	—	November 21, 2003	Socorro	LINEAR	·	1.1 km	MPC · JPL
186657	2003 WN_{138}	—	November 21, 2003	Socorro	LINEAR	·	1.1 km	MPC · JPL
186658	2003 WD_{193}	—	November 24, 2003	Kitt Peak	Spacewatch	·	1.1 km	MPC · JPL
186659	2003 XF_{12}	—	December 14, 2003	Palomar	NEAT	·	1.5 km	MPC · JPL
186660	2003 XH_{15}	—	December 14, 2003	Kitt Peak	Spacewatch	·	880 m	MPC · JPL
186661	2003 XY_{38}	—	December 4, 2003	Socorro	LINEAR	·	990 m	MPC · JPL
186662	2003 YF_{9}	—	December 16, 2003	Kitt Peak	Spacewatch	NYS	1.0 km	MPC · JPL
186663	2003 YH_{9}	—	December 16, 2003	Catalina	CSS	·	1.3 km	MPC · JPL
186664	2003 YA_{30}	—	December 18, 2003	Uccle	Uccle	·	1.2 km	MPC · JPL
186665	2003 YJ_{37}	—	December 17, 2003	Kitt Peak	Spacewatch	·	720 m	MPC · JPL
186666	2003 YH_{59}	—	December 19, 2003	Socorro	LINEAR	·	1.2 km	MPC · JPL
186667	2003 YK_{64}	—	December 19, 2003	Socorro	LINEAR	·	970 m	MPC · JPL
186668	2003 YL_{64}	—	December 19, 2003	Socorro	LINEAR	·	1.0 km	MPC · JPL
186669	2003 YY_{76}	—	December 18, 2003	Socorro	LINEAR	·	1.2 km	MPC · JPL
186670	2003 YP_{77}	—	December 18, 2003	Socorro	LINEAR	NYS	1.8 km	MPC · JPL
186671	2003 YK_{82}	—	December 18, 2003	Socorro	LINEAR	·	1.0 km	MPC · JPL
186672	2003 YX_{98}	—	December 19, 2003	Socorro	LINEAR	·	1.2 km	MPC · JPL
186673	2003 YE_{101}	—	December 19, 2003	Socorro	LINEAR	·	950 m	MPC · JPL
186674	2003 YL_{112}	—	December 23, 2003	Socorro	LINEAR	·	1.1 km	MPC · JPL
186675	2003 YM_{112}	—	December 23, 2003	Socorro	LINEAR	·	990 m	MPC · JPL
186676	2003 YD_{116}	—	December 27, 2003	Kitt Peak	Spacewatch	·	1.1 km	MPC · JPL
186677	2003 YT_{127}	—	December 27, 2003	Socorro	LINEAR	·	1.7 km	MPC · JPL
186678	2003 YB_{129}	—	December 27, 2003	Socorro	LINEAR	·	1.3 km	MPC · JPL
186679	2003 YQ_{129}	—	December 27, 2003	Socorro	LINEAR	·	1.2 km	MPC · JPL
186680	2003 YH_{137}	—	December 27, 2003	Socorro	LINEAR	·	860 m	MPC · JPL
186681	2003 YC_{140}	—	December 28, 2003	Socorro	LINEAR	·	2.3 km	MPC · JPL
186682	2003 YT_{141}	—	December 28, 2003	Socorro	LINEAR	·	1.5 km	MPC · JPL
186683	2003 YU_{145}	—	December 28, 2003	Socorro	LINEAR	·	1.4 km	MPC · JPL
186684	2003 YY_{155}	—	December 20, 2003	Socorro	LINEAR	·	1.0 km	MPC · JPL
186685	2003 YB_{169}	—	December 18, 2003	Socorro	LINEAR	·	1.8 km	MPC · JPL
186686	2004 AZ_{5}	—	January 13, 2004	Anderson Mesa	LONEOS	·	1.2 km	MPC · JPL
186687	2004 AW_{9}	—	January 15, 2004	Kitt Peak	Spacewatch	·	890 m	MPC · JPL
186688	2004 BJ_{2}	—	January 16, 2004	Palomar	NEAT	·	980 m	MPC · JPL
186689	2004 BF_{6}	—	January 16, 2004	Kitt Peak	Spacewatch	·	950 m	MPC · JPL
186690	2004 BB_{12}	—	January 16, 2004	Palomar	NEAT	·	2.1 km	MPC · JPL
186691	2004 BT_{15}	—	January 17, 2004	Palomar	NEAT	·	1.1 km	MPC · JPL
186692	2004 BD_{17}	—	January 17, 2004	Palomar	NEAT	·	1.5 km	MPC · JPL
186693	2004 BF_{22}	—	January 16, 2004	Kitt Peak	Spacewatch	·	1.9 km	MPC · JPL
186694	2004 BD_{29}	—	January 18, 2004	Palomar	NEAT	·	1.1 km	MPC · JPL
186695	2004 BK_{29}	—	January 18, 2004	Palomar	NEAT	·	950 m	MPC · JPL
186696	2004 BM_{31}	—	January 19, 2004	Anderson Mesa	LONEOS	·	1.7 km	MPC · JPL
186697	2004 BK_{38}	—	January 19, 2004	Catalina	CSS	·	1.6 km	MPC · JPL
186698	2004 BU_{41}	—	January 19, 2004	Catalina	CSS	·	2.0 km	MPC · JPL
186699	2004 BD_{43}	—	January 22, 2004	Socorro	LINEAR	·	1.9 km	MPC · JPL
186700	2004 BM_{43}	—	January 22, 2004	Socorro	LINEAR	NYS	1.8 km	MPC · JPL

== 186701–186800 ==
back to top

Designation			Discovery			Properties		Ref
Permanent	Provisional	Named after	Date	Site	Discoverer(s)	Category	Diam.	Ref
186701	2004 BT_{45}	—	January 21, 2004	Socorro	LINEAR	·	1.1 km	MPC · JPL
186702	2004 BZ_{53}	—	January 22, 2004	Socorro	LINEAR	·	1.1 km	MPC · JPL
186703	2004 BO_{54}	—	January 22, 2004	Socorro	LINEAR	NYS	1.7 km	MPC · JPL
186704	2004 BO_{59}	—	January 24, 2004	Socorro	LINEAR	·	1.2 km	MPC · JPL
186705	2004 BG_{67}	—	January 24, 2004	Socorro	LINEAR	·	1.3 km	MPC · JPL
186706	2004 BF_{72}	—	January 23, 2004	Socorro	LINEAR	·	2.3 km	MPC · JPL
186707	2004 BR_{72}	—	January 23, 2004	Socorro	LINEAR	·	1.3 km	MPC · JPL
186708	2004 BU_{72}	—	January 23, 2004	Socorro	LINEAR	ERI	1.6 km	MPC · JPL
186709	2004 BV_{74}	—	January 25, 2004	Haleakala	NEAT	·	1.0 km	MPC · JPL
186710	2004 BD_{75}	—	January 22, 2004	Socorro	LINEAR	NYS	1.2 km	MPC · JPL
186711	2004 BU_{87}	—	January 23, 2004	Socorro	LINEAR	·	1.7 km	MPC · JPL
186712	2004 BF_{88}	—	January 23, 2004	Socorro	LINEAR	·	1.3 km	MPC · JPL
186713	2004 BT_{88}	—	January 23, 2004	Socorro	LINEAR	·	1.8 km	MPC · JPL
186714	2004 BV_{88}	—	January 23, 2004	Socorro	LINEAR	·	2.3 km	MPC · JPL
186715	2004 BW_{91}	—	January 26, 2004	Anderson Mesa	LONEOS	·	1.1 km	MPC · JPL
186716	2004 BQ_{93}	—	January 28, 2004	Socorro	LINEAR	·	1.2 km	MPC · JPL
186717	2004 BN_{96}	—	January 24, 2004	Socorro	LINEAR	·	1.4 km	MPC · JPL
186718	2004 BG_{97}	—	January 24, 2004	Socorro	LINEAR	·	1.4 km	MPC · JPL
186719	2004 BA_{105}	—	January 24, 2004	Socorro	LINEAR	·	1.6 km	MPC · JPL
186720	2004 BN_{106}	—	January 26, 2004	Anderson Mesa	LONEOS	·	1.2 km	MPC · JPL
186721	2004 BE_{108}	—	January 28, 2004	Catalina	CSS	·	1.5 km	MPC · JPL
186722	2004 BT_{108}	—	January 28, 2004	Catalina	CSS	ERI	1.8 km	MPC · JPL
186723	2004 BA_{119}	—	January 30, 2004	Socorro	LINEAR	V	1.1 km	MPC · JPL
186724	2004 BT_{120}	—	January 31, 2004	Socorro	LINEAR	·	1.6 km	MPC · JPL
186725	2004 BV_{134}	—	January 18, 2004	Palomar	NEAT	·	1.0 km	MPC · JPL
186726	2004 BY_{146}	—	January 22, 2004	Socorro	LINEAR	·	1.2 km	MPC · JPL
186727	2004 CR	—	February 9, 2004	Črni Vrh	Matičič, S.	ERI	2.5 km	MPC · JPL
186728	2004 CH_{2}	—	February 12, 2004	Wrightwood	J. W. Young	·	2.7 km	MPC · JPL
186729	2004 CE_{4}	—	February 10, 2004	Palomar	NEAT	·	1.1 km	MPC · JPL
186730	2004 CH_{4}	—	February 10, 2004	Palomar	NEAT	·	1.1 km	MPC · JPL
186731	2004 CP_{5}	—	February 10, 2004	Palomar	NEAT	·	1.3 km	MPC · JPL
186732	2004 CR_{10}	—	February 11, 2004	Palomar	NEAT	NYS	1.0 km	MPC · JPL
186733	2004 CB_{11}	—	February 11, 2004	Palomar	NEAT	·	1.3 km	MPC · JPL
186734	2004 CU_{16}	—	February 11, 2004	Palomar	NEAT	NYS	1.7 km	MPC · JPL
186735	2004 CK_{18}	—	February 10, 2004	Palomar	NEAT	V	1.1 km	MPC · JPL
186736	2004 CB_{21}	—	February 11, 2004	Kitt Peak	Spacewatch	NYS	1.2 km	MPC · JPL
186737	2004 CP_{26}	—	February 11, 2004	Catalina	CSS	·	1.1 km	MPC · JPL
186738	2004 CN_{37}	—	February 12, 2004	Palomar	NEAT	·	2.1 km	MPC · JPL
186739	2004 CL_{39}	—	February 13, 2004	Jonathan B. Postel	Bareggio	·	1.4 km	MPC · JPL
186740	2004 CR_{39}	—	February 14, 2004	Jornada	Dixon, D. S.	·	1.1 km	MPC · JPL
186741	2004 CE_{42}	—	February 10, 2004	Palomar	NEAT	V	1.1 km	MPC · JPL
186742	2004 CZ_{42}	—	February 11, 2004	Palomar	NEAT	·	1.8 km	MPC · JPL
186743	2004 CW_{49}	—	February 11, 2004	Kitt Peak	Spacewatch	·	1.0 km	MPC · JPL
186744	2004 CY_{53}	—	February 11, 2004	Kitt Peak	Spacewatch	MAS	700 m	MPC · JPL
186745	2004 CG_{56}	—	February 14, 2004	Haleakala	NEAT	MAS	1.1 km	MPC · JPL
186746	2004 CX_{58}	—	February 10, 2004	Palomar	NEAT	·	960 m	MPC · JPL
186747	2004 CM_{61}	—	February 11, 2004	Kitt Peak	Spacewatch	·	1.5 km	MPC · JPL
186748	2004 CV_{65}	—	February 15, 2004	Socorro	LINEAR	·	1.1 km	MPC · JPL
186749	2004 CQ_{67}	—	February 10, 2004	Catalina	CSS	NYS	1.4 km	MPC · JPL
186750	2004 CY_{67}	—	February 10, 2004	Palomar	NEAT	·	1.9 km	MPC · JPL
186751	2004 CZ_{69}	—	February 11, 2004	Palomar	NEAT	·	1.6 km	MPC · JPL
186752	2004 CB_{71}	—	February 12, 2004	Kitt Peak	Spacewatch	·	1.7 km	MPC · JPL
186753	2004 CK_{72}	—	February 13, 2004	Kitt Peak	Spacewatch	·	1.9 km	MPC · JPL
186754	2004 CP_{74}	—	February 11, 2004	Kitt Peak	Spacewatch	·	1.4 km	MPC · JPL
186755	2004 CJ_{76}	—	February 11, 2004	Palomar	NEAT	ERI	2.5 km	MPC · JPL
186756	2004 CA_{78}	—	February 11, 2004	Palomar	NEAT	·	1.9 km	MPC · JPL
186757	2004 CG_{78}	—	February 11, 2004	Palomar	NEAT	·	1.4 km	MPC · JPL
186758	2004 CX_{94}	—	February 12, 2004	Palomar	NEAT	·	950 m	MPC · JPL
186759	2004 CN_{95}	—	February 13, 2004	Kitt Peak	Spacewatch	PHO	1.3 km	MPC · JPL
186760	2004 CS_{98}	—	February 14, 2004	Catalina	CSS	·	2.1 km	MPC · JPL
186761	2004 CS_{99}	—	February 15, 2004	Catalina	CSS	NYS	1.8 km	MPC · JPL
186762	2004 CB_{108}	—	February 14, 2004	Haleakala	NEAT	·	1.7 km	MPC · JPL
186763	2004 CC_{108}	—	February 14, 2004	Haleakala	NEAT	·	1.8 km	MPC · JPL
186764	2004 CC_{120}	—	February 12, 2004	Kitt Peak	Spacewatch	·	1.6 km	MPC · JPL
186765	2004 CS_{122}	—	February 12, 2004	Kitt Peak	Spacewatch	·	1.1 km	MPC · JPL
186766	2004 DG	—	February 16, 2004	Desert Eagle	W. K. Y. Yeung	·	2.2 km	MPC · JPL
186767	2004 DY_{8}	—	February 17, 2004	Kitt Peak	Spacewatch	NYS	1.3 km	MPC · JPL
186768	2004 DS_{11}	—	February 17, 2004	Kitt Peak	Spacewatch	·	2.9 km	MPC · JPL
186769	2004 DT_{15}	—	February 17, 2004	Socorro	LINEAR	·	2.4 km	MPC · JPL
186770	2004 DE_{18}	—	February 18, 2004	Socorro	LINEAR	MAS	1.1 km	MPC · JPL
186771	2004 DQ_{18}	—	February 18, 2004	Haleakala	NEAT	V	1.2 km	MPC · JPL
186772	2004 DQ_{20}	—	February 17, 2004	Socorro	LINEAR	·	1.4 km	MPC · JPL
186773	2004 DJ_{21}	—	February 17, 2004	Catalina	CSS	·	1.7 km	MPC · JPL
186774	2004 DC_{22}	—	February 17, 2004	Catalina	CSS	·	1.7 km	MPC · JPL
186775	2004 DL_{24}	—	February 19, 2004	Socorro	LINEAR	·	2.0 km	MPC · JPL
186776	2004 DH_{32}	—	February 18, 2004	Socorro	LINEAR	PHO	1.6 km	MPC · JPL
186777	2004 DY_{32}	—	February 18, 2004	Socorro	LINEAR	·	2.0 km	MPC · JPL
186778	2004 DW_{33}	—	February 18, 2004	Socorro	LINEAR	NYS	1.5 km	MPC · JPL
186779	2004 DB_{35}	—	February 19, 2004	Socorro	LINEAR	·	1.8 km	MPC · JPL
186780	2004 DQ_{40}	—	February 18, 2004	Kitt Peak	Spacewatch	·	1.6 km	MPC · JPL
186781	2004 DE_{43}	—	February 23, 2004	Socorro	LINEAR	·	1.6 km	MPC · JPL
186782	2004 DT_{47}	—	February 19, 2004	Socorro	LINEAR	·	1.9 km	MPC · JPL
186783	2004 DT_{48}	—	February 19, 2004	Socorro	LINEAR	MAS	1.2 km	MPC · JPL
186784	2004 DB_{53}	—	February 26, 2004	Goodricke-Pigott	R. A. Tucker	·	3.1 km	MPC · JPL
186785	2004 DG_{62}	—	February 23, 2004	Socorro	LINEAR	NYS	1.4 km	MPC · JPL
186786	2004 DX_{62}	—	February 29, 2004	Kitt Peak	Spacewatch	·	1.7 km	MPC · JPL
186787	2004 DS_{63}	—	February 29, 2004	Kitt Peak	Spacewatch	CLA	1.7 km	MPC · JPL
186788	2004 EP_{1}	—	March 11, 2004	Palomar	NEAT	MAS	960 m	MPC · JPL
186789	2004 EF_{8}	—	March 13, 2004	Palomar	NEAT	·	1.8 km	MPC · JPL
186790	2004 EK_{12}	—	March 11, 2004	Palomar	NEAT	·	4.3 km	MPC · JPL
186791	2004 ER_{13}	—	March 11, 2004	Palomar	NEAT	·	1.9 km	MPC · JPL
186792	2004 EK_{17}	—	March 12, 2004	Palomar	NEAT	V	1.1 km	MPC · JPL
186793	2004 ES_{31}	—	March 14, 2004	Palomar	NEAT	·	2.3 km	MPC · JPL
186794	2004 EO_{33}	—	March 15, 2004	Socorro	LINEAR	·	1.6 km	MPC · JPL
186795	2004 ER_{38}	—	March 14, 2004	Kitt Peak	Spacewatch	PHO	1.5 km	MPC · JPL
186796	2004 EZ_{38}	—	March 14, 2004	Catalina	CSS	·	2.1 km	MPC · JPL
186797	2004 ED_{39}	—	March 15, 2004	Kitt Peak	Spacewatch	MAS	900 m	MPC · JPL
186798	2004 EK_{39}	—	March 15, 2004	Kitt Peak	Spacewatch	·	1.9 km	MPC · JPL
186799	2004 ER_{51}	—	March 15, 2004	Socorro	LINEAR	·	1.7 km	MPC · JPL
186800	2004 EJ_{52}	—	March 15, 2004	Socorro	LINEAR	NYS	1.7 km	MPC · JPL

== 186801–186900 ==
back to top

Designation			Discovery			Properties		Ref
Permanent	Provisional	Named after	Date	Site	Discoverer(s)	Category	Diam.	Ref
186801	2004 EF_{54}	—	March 15, 2004	Campo Imperatore	CINEOS	·	1.6 km	MPC · JPL
186802	2004 EA_{58}	—	March 15, 2004	Socorro	LINEAR	·	2.1 km	MPC · JPL
186803	2004 EH_{59}	—	March 15, 2004	Kitt Peak	Spacewatch	·	3.1 km	MPC · JPL
186804	2004 EU_{59}	—	March 15, 2004	Palomar	NEAT	·	2.1 km	MPC · JPL
186805	2004 EW_{61}	—	March 12, 2004	Palomar	NEAT	·	1.3 km	MPC · JPL
186806	2004 EE_{76}	—	March 15, 2004	Socorro	LINEAR	NYS	1.9 km	MPC · JPL
186807	2004 EF_{76}	—	March 15, 2004	Socorro	LINEAR	·	2.0 km	MPC · JPL
186808	2004 EQ_{76}	—	March 15, 2004	Kitt Peak	Spacewatch	MAS	870 m	MPC · JPL
186809	2004 EJ_{82}	—	March 15, 2004	Socorro	LINEAR	·	1.7 km	MPC · JPL
186810	2004 EB_{86}	—	March 15, 2004	Socorro	LINEAR	·	1.6 km	MPC · JPL
186811	2004 EG_{94}	—	March 15, 2004	Catalina	CSS	MAS	960 m	MPC · JPL
186812	2004 EE_{115}	—	March 14, 2004	Kitt Peak	Spacewatch	NYS	1.3 km	MPC · JPL
186813	2004 FT_{7}	—	March 16, 2004	Socorro	LINEAR	MAS	1.1 km	MPC · JPL
186814	2004 FB_{10}	—	March 16, 2004	Campo Imperatore	CINEOS	·	2.3 km	MPC · JPL
186815	2004 FJ_{12}	—	March 16, 2004	Socorro	LINEAR	V	1.2 km	MPC · JPL
186816	2004 FR_{17}	—	March 26, 2004	Socorro	LINEAR	PHO	5.4 km	MPC · JPL
186817	2004 FM_{19}	—	March 16, 2004	Socorro	LINEAR	·	2.0 km	MPC · JPL
186818	2004 FN_{23}	—	March 17, 2004	Kitt Peak	Spacewatch	·	2.1 km	MPC · JPL
186819	2004 FQ_{23}	—	March 17, 2004	Kitt Peak	Spacewatch	·	1.4 km	MPC · JPL
186820	2004 FA_{26}	—	March 17, 2004	Socorro	LINEAR	·	1.8 km	MPC · JPL
186821	2004 FH_{26}	—	March 17, 2004	Kitt Peak	Spacewatch	·	2.3 km	MPC · JPL
186822	2004 FE_{31}	—	March 29, 2004	Kitt Peak	Spacewatch	APO +1km	980 m	MPC · JPL
186823	2004 FN_{32}	—	March 31, 2004	Kitt Peak	Spacewatch	APO	540 m	MPC · JPL
186824	2004 FC_{35}	—	March 16, 2004	Kitt Peak	Spacewatch	·	2.1 km	MPC · JPL
186825	2004 FD_{37}	—	March 16, 2004	Campo Imperatore	CINEOS	NYS	1.4 km	MPC · JPL
186826	2004 FH_{37}	—	March 17, 2004	Kitt Peak	Spacewatch	·	1.4 km	MPC · JPL
186827	2004 FA_{43}	—	March 18, 2004	Socorro	LINEAR	·	1.5 km	MPC · JPL
186828	2004 FY_{51}	—	March 19, 2004	Socorro	LINEAR	NYS	1.7 km	MPC · JPL
186829	2004 FJ_{59}	—	March 18, 2004	Socorro	LINEAR	ERI	3.0 km	MPC · JPL
186830	2004 FW_{61}	—	March 19, 2004	Socorro	LINEAR	V	1.4 km	MPC · JPL
186831	2004 FS_{62}	—	March 19, 2004	Socorro	LINEAR	·	1.5 km	MPC · JPL
186832 Mosser	2004 FD_{76}	Mosser	March 17, 2004	Valmeca	C. Demeautis, Matter, D.	NYS	1.7 km	MPC · JPL
186833	2004 FF_{85}	—	March 18, 2004	Kitt Peak	Spacewatch	·	1.7 km	MPC · JPL
186834	2004 FJ_{86}	—	March 19, 2004	Palomar	NEAT	·	1.7 km	MPC · JPL
186835 Normanspinrad	2004 FE_{92}	Normanspinrad	March 27, 2004	Saint-Sulpice	B. Christophe	V	900 m	MPC · JPL
186836	2004 FU_{93}	—	March 22, 2004	Socorro	LINEAR	·	1.6 km	MPC · JPL
186837	2004 FY_{108}	—	March 23, 2004	Kitt Peak	Spacewatch	·	1.8 km	MPC · JPL
186838	2004 FG_{109}	—	March 24, 2004	Anderson Mesa	LONEOS	·	1.9 km	MPC · JPL
186839	2004 FY_{127}	—	March 27, 2004	Catalina	CSS	·	2.3 km	MPC · JPL
186840	2004 FZ_{129}	—	March 20, 2004	Siding Spring	SSS	·	2.3 km	MPC · JPL
186841	2004 FK_{133}	—	March 23, 2004	Socorro	LINEAR	V	1.0 km	MPC · JPL
186842	2004 FU_{140}	—	March 27, 2004	Socorro	LINEAR	MAS	1.0 km	MPC · JPL
186843	2004 GV	—	April 9, 2004	Siding Spring	SSS	NYS	1.4 km	MPC · JPL
186844	2004 GA_{1}	—	April 11, 2004	Reedy Creek	J. Broughton	APO +1km · PHA	1.1 km	MPC · JPL
186845	2004 GV_{2}	—	April 12, 2004	Socorro	LINEAR	BAR	2.4 km	MPC · JPL
186846	2004 GP_{8}	—	April 12, 2004	Kitt Peak	Spacewatch	(5)	1.1 km	MPC · JPL
186847	2004 GN_{21}	—	April 11, 2004	Palomar	NEAT	·	2.1 km	MPC · JPL
186848	2004 GF_{22}	—	April 12, 2004	Palomar	NEAT	MAS	1.0 km	MPC · JPL
186849	2004 GK_{22}	—	April 12, 2004	Palomar	NEAT	·	2.1 km	MPC · JPL
186850	2004 GT_{34}	—	April 13, 2004	Palomar	NEAT	·	1.3 km	MPC · JPL
186851	2004 GF_{38}	—	April 15, 2004	Palomar	NEAT	·	2.5 km	MPC · JPL
186852	2004 GH_{38}	—	April 15, 2004	Catalina	CSS	·	2.3 km	MPC · JPL
186853	2004 GY_{40}	—	April 12, 2004	Catalina	CSS	·	2.9 km	MPC · JPL
186854	2004 GE_{42}	—	April 14, 2004	Kitt Peak	Spacewatch	·	1.8 km	MPC · JPL
186855	2004 GL_{43}	—	April 12, 2004	Kitt Peak	Spacewatch	·	1.7 km	MPC · JPL
186856	2004 GE_{44}	—	April 12, 2004	Palomar	NEAT	·	1.3 km	MPC · JPL
186857	2004 GF_{45}	—	April 12, 2004	Kitt Peak	Spacewatch	V	1.0 km	MPC · JPL
186858	2004 GA_{54}	—	April 13, 2004	Kitt Peak	Spacewatch	·	1.9 km	MPC · JPL
186859	2004 GW_{56}	—	April 14, 2004	Kitt Peak	Spacewatch	·	2.2 km	MPC · JPL
186860	2004 GV_{60}	—	April 14, 2004	Kitt Peak	Spacewatch	·	1.3 km	MPC · JPL
186861	2004 GD_{86}	—	April 14, 2004	Kitt Peak	Spacewatch	·	1.8 km	MPC · JPL
186862	2004 HG_{4}	—	April 16, 2004	Kitt Peak	Spacewatch	·	1.9 km	MPC · JPL
186863	2004 HH_{18}	—	April 17, 2004	Socorro	LINEAR	·	3.7 km	MPC · JPL
186864	2004 HN_{23}	—	April 16, 2004	Kitt Peak	Spacewatch	·	1.6 km	MPC · JPL
186865	2004 HO_{24}	—	April 17, 2004	Socorro	LINEAR	(194) · slow	2.7 km	MPC · JPL
186866	2004 HE_{26}	—	April 19, 2004	Socorro	LINEAR	·	1.9 km	MPC · JPL
186867	2004 HS_{26}	—	April 20, 2004	Socorro	LINEAR	ADE ·	2.6 km	MPC · JPL
186868	2004 HW_{30}	—	April 20, 2004	Socorro	LINEAR	·	2.2 km	MPC · JPL
186869	2004 HX_{31}	—	April 19, 2004	Socorro	LINEAR	·	1.4 km	MPC · JPL
186870	2004 HM_{33}	—	April 16, 2004	Socorro	LINEAR	·	1.7 km	MPC · JPL
186871	2004 HE_{41}	—	April 19, 2004	Kitt Peak	Spacewatch	·	1.6 km	MPC · JPL
186872	2004 HE_{44}	—	April 21, 2004	Socorro	LINEAR	·	2.0 km	MPC · JPL
186873	2004 HS_{47}	—	April 22, 2004	Kitt Peak	Spacewatch	·	2.9 km	MPC · JPL
186874	2004 HD_{60}	—	April 25, 2004	Socorro	LINEAR	·	2.9 km	MPC · JPL
186875	2004 HG_{61}	—	April 25, 2004	Socorro	LINEAR	·	3.7 km	MPC · JPL
186876	2004 HR_{61}	—	April 29, 2004	Haleakala	NEAT	·	2.0 km	MPC · JPL
186877	2004 HA_{64}	—	April 25, 2004	Socorro	LINEAR	·	1.8 km	MPC · JPL
186878	2004 HD_{66}	—	April 20, 2004	Socorro	LINEAR	·	2.0 km	MPC · JPL
186879	2004 JD_{4}	—	May 9, 2004	Kitt Peak	Spacewatch	EUN ·	1.8 km	MPC · JPL
186880	2004 JJ_{9}	—	May 13, 2004	Kitt Peak	Spacewatch	·	2.8 km	MPC · JPL
186881	2004 JV_{14}	—	May 9, 2004	Kitt Peak	Spacewatch	·	2.0 km	MPC · JPL
186882	2004 JA_{16}	—	May 10, 2004	Haleakala	NEAT	RAF	1.5 km	MPC · JPL
186883	2004 JV_{19}	—	May 13, 2004	Palomar	NEAT	·	4.3 km	MPC · JPL
186884	2004 JD_{27}	—	May 15, 2004	Socorro	LINEAR	·	2.1 km	MPC · JPL
186885	2004 JY_{27}	—	May 15, 2004	Siding Spring	SSS	·	3.4 km	MPC · JPL
186886	2004 JH_{29}	—	May 15, 2004	Socorro	LINEAR	·	1.9 km	MPC · JPL
186887	2004 JM_{29}	—	May 15, 2004	Socorro	LINEAR	·	1.9 km	MPC · JPL
186888	2004 JL_{33}	—	May 15, 2004	Socorro	LINEAR	·	1.8 km	MPC · JPL
186889	2004 JH_{36}	—	May 13, 2004	Anderson Mesa	LONEOS	·	2.3 km	MPC · JPL
186890	2004 JG_{38}	—	May 14, 2004	Kitt Peak	Spacewatch	(194)	2.3 km	MPC · JPL
186891	2004 JX_{41}	—	May 15, 2004	Socorro	LINEAR	ADE	2.9 km	MPC · JPL
186892	2004 JT_{42}	—	May 15, 2004	Socorro	LINEAR	·	1.5 km	MPC · JPL
186893	2004 JD_{46}	—	May 13, 2004	Kitt Peak	Spacewatch	·	2.0 km	MPC · JPL
186894	2004 KS_{2}	—	May 16, 2004	Kitt Peak	Spacewatch	·	1.2 km	MPC · JPL
186895	2004 KK_{3}	—	May 16, 2004	Socorro	LINEAR	·	1.8 km	MPC · JPL
186896	2004 KX_{4}	—	May 18, 2004	Socorro	LINEAR	EUN ·	2.0 km	MPC · JPL
186897	2004 KG_{8}	—	May 16, 2004	Socorro	LINEAR	(5)	1.9 km	MPC · JPL
186898	2004 KW_{14}	—	May 23, 2004	Kitt Peak	Spacewatch	MAR	1.2 km	MPC · JPL
186899	2004 KN_{17}	—	May 30, 2004	Siding Spring	SSS	·	3.8 km	MPC · JPL
186900	2004 LR_{1}	—	June 5, 2004	Palomar	NEAT	·	2.5 km	MPC · JPL

== 186901–187000 ==
back to top

Designation			Discovery			Properties		Ref
Permanent	Provisional	Named after	Date	Site	Discoverer(s)	Category	Diam.	Ref
186901	2004 LS_{6}	—	June 11, 2004	Kitt Peak	Spacewatch	·	1.8 km	MPC · JPL
186902	2004 LV_{6}	—	June 11, 2004	Socorro	LINEAR	·	3.7 km	MPC · JPL
186903	2004 LH_{15}	—	June 11, 2004	Socorro	LINEAR	·	2.9 km	MPC · JPL
186904	2004 LQ_{15}	—	June 12, 2004	Socorro	LINEAR	·	1.5 km	MPC · JPL
186905	2004 LR_{15}	—	June 12, 2004	Socorro	LINEAR	EUN ·	2.0 km	MPC · JPL
186906	2004 LC_{20}	—	June 11, 2004	Socorro	LINEAR	(194)	3.5 km	MPC · JPL
186907	2004 LO_{20}	—	June 12, 2004	Socorro	LINEAR	KON	3.8 km	MPC · JPL
186908	2004 LO_{21}	—	June 12, 2004	Socorro	LINEAR	·	2.9 km	MPC · JPL
186909	2004 LC_{24}	—	June 11, 2004	Palomar	NEAT	·	2.1 km	MPC · JPL
186910	2004 LV_{25}	—	June 15, 2004	Kitt Peak	Spacewatch	·	3.5 km	MPC · JPL
186911	2004 LS_{27}	—	June 13, 2004	Kitt Peak	Spacewatch	EUN	1.9 km	MPC · JPL
186912	2004 ME_{2}	—	June 17, 2004	Palomar	NEAT	·	2.9 km	MPC · JPL
186913	2004 MS_{2}	—	June 19, 2004	Catalina	CSS	·	1.6 km	MPC · JPL
186914	2004 NS_{7}	—	July 14, 2004	Socorro	LINEAR	·	2.9 km	MPC · JPL
186915	2004 NP_{8}	—	July 10, 2004	Needville	J. Dellinger, Eastman, M.	AGN	1.6 km	MPC · JPL
186916	2004 NB_{19}	—	July 14, 2004	Socorro	LINEAR	GEF	2.0 km	MPC · JPL
186917	2004 NC_{21}	—	July 14, 2004	Socorro	LINEAR	·	3.1 km	MPC · JPL
186918	2004 PT_{13}	—	August 7, 2004	Palomar	NEAT	·	3.4 km	MPC · JPL
186919	2004 PU_{22}	—	August 8, 2004	Socorro	LINEAR	MRX	1.6 km	MPC · JPL
186920	2004 PM_{27}	—	August 9, 2004	Reedy Creek	J. Broughton	·	2.7 km	MPC · JPL
186921	2004 PM_{36}	—	August 9, 2004	Socorro	LINEAR	·	2.7 km	MPC · JPL
186922	2004 PL_{45}	—	August 7, 2004	Palomar	NEAT	·	3.0 km	MPC · JPL
186923	2004 PS_{51}	—	August 8, 2004	Socorro	LINEAR	DOR · slow	4.3 km	MPC · JPL
186924	2004 PD_{60}	—	August 9, 2004	Socorro	LINEAR	HYG	5.3 km	MPC · JPL
186925	2004 PC_{61}	—	August 9, 2004	Socorro	LINEAR	·	2.9 km	MPC · JPL
186926	2004 PG_{67}	—	August 5, 2004	Palomar	NEAT	·	6.1 km	MPC · JPL
186927	2004 PJ_{72}	—	August 8, 2004	Socorro	LINEAR	·	2.9 km	MPC · JPL
186928	2004 PV_{72}	—	August 8, 2004	Palomar	NEAT	·	3.3 km	MPC · JPL
186929	2004 PG_{77}	—	August 9, 2004	Socorro	LINEAR	·	3.9 km	MPC · JPL
186930	2004 PX_{79}	—	August 9, 2004	Anderson Mesa	LONEOS	·	2.4 km	MPC · JPL
186931	2004 PQ_{82}	—	August 10, 2004	Socorro	LINEAR	THM	4.5 km	MPC · JPL
186932	2004 PC_{85}	—	August 10, 2004	Socorro	LINEAR	·	2.9 km	MPC · JPL
186933	2004 PO_{94}	—	August 10, 2004	Anderson Mesa	LONEOS	GEF	2.1 km	MPC · JPL
186934	2004 PS_{103}	—	August 12, 2004	Socorro	LINEAR	·	4.0 km	MPC · JPL
186935	2004 PV_{104}	—	August 15, 2004	Reedy Creek	J. Broughton	·	3.9 km	MPC · JPL
186936	2004 PA_{106}	—	August 15, 2004	Siding Spring	SSS	·	4.7 km	MPC · JPL
186937	2004 PF_{107}	—	August 15, 2004	Palomar	NEAT	·	3.8 km	MPC · JPL
186938	2004 QS	—	August 18, 2004	Pla D'Arguines	R. Ferrando	·	2.3 km	MPC · JPL
186939	2004 QK_{1}	—	August 19, 2004	Pla D'Arguines	R. Ferrando	KOR	2.3 km	MPC · JPL
186940	2004 QZ_{8}	—	August 19, 2004	Siding Spring	SSS	URS	5.6 km	MPC · JPL
186941	2004 QH_{11}	—	August 21, 2004	Siding Spring	SSS	·	3.6 km	MPC · JPL
186942	2004 QQ_{12}	—	August 21, 2004	Siding Spring	SSS	EOS	6.3 km	MPC · JPL
186943	2004 QT_{12}	—	August 21, 2004	Siding Spring	SSS	·	3.3 km	MPC · JPL
186944	2004 QW_{27}	—	August 25, 2004	Kitt Peak	Spacewatch	·	3.4 km	MPC · JPL
186945	2004 RX_{4}	—	September 4, 2004	Palomar	NEAT	·	4.0 km	MPC · JPL
186946	2004 RB_{12}	—	September 7, 2004	Saint-Véran	St. Veran	·	4.0 km	MPC · JPL
186947	2004 RE_{31}	—	September 7, 2004	Socorro	LINEAR	·	3.3 km	MPC · JPL
186948	2004 RF_{45}	—	September 8, 2004	Socorro	LINEAR	·	2.7 km	MPC · JPL
186949	2004 RW_{47}	—	September 8, 2004	Socorro	LINEAR	·	3.1 km	MPC · JPL
186950	2004 RC_{51}	—	September 8, 2004	Socorro	LINEAR	EOS	3.3 km	MPC · JPL
186951	2004 RO_{52}	—	September 8, 2004	Socorro	LINEAR	EOS	3.0 km	MPC · JPL
186952	2004 RD_{57}	—	September 8, 2004	Socorro	LINEAR	·	5.8 km	MPC · JPL
186953	2004 RP_{69}	—	September 8, 2004	Socorro	LINEAR	EOS	3.7 km	MPC · JPL
186954	2004 RG_{74}	—	September 8, 2004	Socorro	LINEAR	VER	5.3 km	MPC · JPL
186955	2004 RY_{76}	—	September 8, 2004	Socorro	LINEAR	EMA	5.2 km	MPC · JPL
186956	2004 RC_{77}	—	September 8, 2004	Socorro	LINEAR	·	4.9 km	MPC · JPL
186957	2004 RS_{77}	—	September 8, 2004	Socorro	LINEAR	(31811)	5.0 km	MPC · JPL
186958	2004 RT_{83}	—	September 7, 2004	Socorro	LINEAR	·	7.2 km	MPC · JPL
186959	2004 RN_{87}	—	September 7, 2004	Palomar	NEAT	·	2.9 km	MPC · JPL
186960	2004 RW_{105}	—	September 8, 2004	Palomar	NEAT	·	6.4 km	MPC · JPL
186961	2004 RN_{107}	—	September 9, 2004	Socorro	LINEAR	·	3.0 km	MPC · JPL
186962	2004 RK_{108}	—	September 9, 2004	Kitt Peak	Spacewatch	·	4.5 km	MPC · JPL
186963	2004 RV_{140}	—	September 8, 2004	Socorro	LINEAR	·	3.3 km	MPC · JPL
186964	2004 RV_{141}	—	September 8, 2004	Socorro	LINEAR	·	5.8 km	MPC · JPL
186965	2004 RX_{143}	—	September 8, 2004	Socorro	LINEAR	EOS	3.6 km	MPC · JPL
186966	2004 RA_{144}	—	September 8, 2004	Socorro	LINEAR	·	3.7 km	MPC · JPL
186967	2004 RY_{150}	—	September 9, 2004	Socorro	LINEAR	·	4.5 km	MPC · JPL
186968	2004 RX_{154}	—	September 10, 2004	Socorro	LINEAR	·	5.3 km	MPC · JPL
186969	2004 RN_{161}	—	September 10, 2004	Socorro	LINEAR	·	3.0 km	MPC · JPL
186970	2004 RR_{176}	—	September 10, 2004	Socorro	LINEAR	·	5.6 km	MPC · JPL
186971	2004 RW_{176}	—	September 10, 2004	Socorro	LINEAR	LIX	6.5 km	MPC · JPL
186972	2004 RB_{177}	—	September 10, 2004	Socorro	LINEAR	·	4.9 km	MPC · JPL
186973	2004 RY_{184}	—	September 10, 2004	Socorro	LINEAR	EOS	3.1 km	MPC · JPL
186974	2004 RK_{188}	—	September 10, 2004	Socorro	LINEAR	·	6.3 km	MPC · JPL
186975	2004 RY_{209}	—	September 11, 2004	Socorro	LINEAR	·	5.5 km	MPC · JPL
186976	2004 RX_{221}	—	September 13, 2004	Socorro	LINEAR	·	3.4 km	MPC · JPL
186977	2004 RT_{226}	—	September 9, 2004	Socorro	LINEAR	·	6.2 km	MPC · JPL
186978	2004 RL_{257}	—	September 9, 2004	Anderson Mesa	LONEOS	·	3.0 km	MPC · JPL
186979	2004 RT_{257}	—	September 9, 2004	Anderson Mesa	LONEOS	·	7.0 km	MPC · JPL
186980	2004 RW_{292}	—	September 10, 2004	Kitt Peak	Spacewatch	THM	3.2 km	MPC · JPL
186981	2004 RD_{329}	—	September 15, 2004	Anderson Mesa	LONEOS	·	4.4 km	MPC · JPL
186982	2004 RS_{340}	—	September 7, 2004	Socorro	LINEAR	·	7.0 km	MPC · JPL
186983	2004 RW_{340}	—	September 7, 2004	Socorro	LINEAR	·	5.2 km	MPC · JPL
186984	2004 SV_{16}	—	September 17, 2004	Anderson Mesa	LONEOS	EOS	3.1 km	MPC · JPL
186985	2004 SN_{47}	—	September 18, 2004	Socorro	LINEAR	·	7.0 km	MPC · JPL
186986	2004 SQ_{48}	—	September 20, 2004	Siding Spring	SSS	·	4.1 km	MPC · JPL
186987	2004 SD_{58}	—	September 16, 2004	Anderson Mesa	LONEOS	·	4.3 km	MPC · JPL
186988	2004 TM_{6}	—	October 2, 2004	Palomar	NEAT	·	5.0 km	MPC · JPL
186989	2004 TX_{6}	—	October 3, 2004	Palomar	NEAT	EOS	3.3 km	MPC · JPL
186990	2004 TD_{7}	—	October 5, 2004	Socorro	LINEAR	·	6.0 km	MPC · JPL
186991	2004 TS_{8}	—	October 6, 2004	Socorro	LINEAR	·	7.0 km	MPC · JPL
186992	2004 TZ_{8}	—	October 7, 2004	Palomar	NEAT	·	9.0 km	MPC · JPL
186993	2004 TB_{13}	—	October 6, 2004	Socorro	LINEAR	·	3.9 km	MPC · JPL
186994	2004 TC_{14}	—	October 10, 2004	Goodricke-Pigott	Goodricke-Pigott	·	3.3 km	MPC · JPL
186995	2004 TE_{66}	—	October 5, 2004	Anderson Mesa	LONEOS	·	4.0 km	MPC · JPL
186996	2004 TK_{68}	—	October 5, 2004	Anderson Mesa	LONEOS	·	5.4 km	MPC · JPL
186997	2004 TX_{77}	—	October 2, 2004	Palomar	NEAT	·	3.5 km	MPC · JPL
186998	2004 TW_{87}	—	October 5, 2004	Kitt Peak	Spacewatch	·	3.9 km	MPC · JPL
186999	2004 TN_{97}	—	October 5, 2004	Kitt Peak	Spacewatch	·	5.8 km	MPC · JPL
187000	2004 TQ_{106}	—	October 7, 2004	Socorro	LINEAR	·	3.8 km	MPC · JPL

back to top

== See also ==
- Meanings of minor-planet names: 186001–187000
