= List of minor planets: 704001–705000 =

The following is a partial list of minor planets, running from minor-planet number 704001 through 705000, inclusive. The primary data for this and other partial lists is based on JPL's "Small-Body Orbital Elements" and data available from the Minor Planet Center. Critical list information is also provided by the MPC, unless otherwise specified from Lowell Observatory. A detailed description of the table's columns and additional sources are given on the main page including a complete list of every page in this series, and a statistical break-up on the dynamical classification of minor planets.

Also see the summary list of all named bodies in numerical and alphabetical order, and the corresponding naming citations for the number range of this particular list. New namings may only be added to this list after official publication, as the preannouncement of names is condemned by the Working Group for Small Bodies Nomenclature of the International Astronomical Union.

Near-Earth obj.	MBA (inner)	MBA (outer)	Centaur
Mars-crosser	MBA (middle)	Jupiter trojan	Trans-Neptunian obj.
Unclassified

== 704001–704100 ==
Designation			Discovery			Properties		Ref
Permanent	Provisional	Named after	Date	Site	Discoverer(s)	Category	Diam.	Ref
704001	2007 WV_{65}	—	November 20, 2007	Catalina	CSS	·	1.4 km	MPC · JPL
704002	2007 WV_{66}	—	January 18, 2013	Kitt Peak	Spacewatch	·	1.4 km	MPC · JPL
704003	2007 WZ_{66}	—	February 2, 2009	Kitt Peak	Spacewatch	·	2.7 km	MPC · JPL
704004	2007 WJ_{67}	—	November 17, 2007	Mount Lemmon	Mount Lemmon Survey	NEM	2.0 km	MPC · JPL
704005	2007 WP_{67}	—	July 28, 2015	Haleakala	Pan-STARRS 1	·	1.8 km	MPC · JPL
704006	2007 WR_{67}	—	October 30, 2007	Mount Lemmon	Mount Lemmon Survey	·	1.5 km	MPC · JPL
704007	2007 WC_{69}	—	September 7, 2011	Kitt Peak	Spacewatch	·	1.6 km	MPC · JPL
704008	2007 WL_{70}	—	January 4, 2013	Cerro Tololo	DECam	·	750 m	MPC · JPL
704009	2007 WW_{71}	—	November 18, 2007	Mount Lemmon	Mount Lemmon Survey	·	890 m	MPC · JPL
704010	2007 WM_{72}	—	November 19, 2007	Mount Lemmon	Mount Lemmon Survey	·	1.7 km	MPC · JPL
704011	2007 WN_{72}	—	November 20, 2007	Kitt Peak	Spacewatch	·	720 m	MPC · JPL
704012	2007 WR_{72}	—	November 18, 2007	Kitt Peak	Spacewatch	·	1.5 km	MPC · JPL
704013	2007 WZ_{72}	—	November 19, 2007	Mount Lemmon	Mount Lemmon Survey	·	1.5 km	MPC · JPL
704014	2007 WB_{73}	—	November 17, 2007	Kitt Peak	Spacewatch	·	1.5 km	MPC · JPL
704015	2007 WF_{73}	—	November 18, 2007	Mount Lemmon	Mount Lemmon Survey	·	1.4 km	MPC · JPL
704016	2007 WL_{73}	—	November 20, 2007	Kitt Peak	Spacewatch	·	1.9 km	MPC · JPL
704017	2007 WC_{75}	—	November 20, 2007	Kitt Peak	Spacewatch	MRX	780 m	MPC · JPL
704018	2007 XD	—	November 21, 2007	Mount Lemmon	Mount Lemmon Survey	·	740 m	MPC · JPL
704019	2007 XV_{1}	—	November 2, 2007	Kitt Peak	Spacewatch	·	1.9 km	MPC · JPL
704020	2007 XK_{2}	—	November 6, 2007	Kitt Peak	Spacewatch	·	600 m	MPC · JPL
704021	2007 XJ_{8}	—	September 22, 1995	Kitt Peak	Spacewatch	·	970 m	MPC · JPL
704022	2007 XL_{12}	—	December 4, 2007	Kitt Peak	Spacewatch	·	1.6 km	MPC · JPL
704023	2007 XS_{12}	—	December 4, 2007	Kitt Peak	Spacewatch	·	3.2 km	MPC · JPL
704024	2007 XY_{13}	—	December 5, 2007	Kitt Peak	Spacewatch	H	460 m	MPC · JPL
704025	2007 XA_{21}	—	December 13, 2007	Costitx	OAM	H	490 m	MPC · JPL
704026	2007 XQ_{21}	—	November 4, 2007	Kitt Peak	Spacewatch	·	1.7 km	MPC · JPL
704027	2007 XD_{25}	—	December 15, 2007	Bergisch Gladbach	W. Bickel	·	2.7 km	MPC · JPL
704028	2007 XO_{26}	—	October 10, 2007	Mount Lemmon	Mount Lemmon Survey	WIT	820 m	MPC · JPL
704029	2007 XR_{27}	—	December 14, 2007	Kitt Peak	Spacewatch	·	1.4 km	MPC · JPL
704030	2007 XB_{28}	—	November 14, 2007	Mount Lemmon	Mount Lemmon Survey	·	1.7 km	MPC · JPL
704031	2007 XT_{28}	—	November 13, 2007	Kitt Peak	Spacewatch	AGN	960 m	MPC · JPL
704032	2007 XZ_{42}	—	November 14, 2007	Kitt Peak	Spacewatch	·	1.4 km	MPC · JPL
704033	2007 XH_{44}	—	December 15, 2007	Kitt Peak	Spacewatch	·	1.9 km	MPC · JPL
704034	2007 XH_{59}	—	December 15, 2007	Kitt Peak	Spacewatch	·	1.6 km	MPC · JPL
704035	2007 XY_{59}	—	November 9, 2007	Kitt Peak	Spacewatch	·	1.8 km	MPC · JPL
704036	2007 XQ_{60}	—	December 4, 2007	Catalina	CSS	·	710 m	MPC · JPL
704037	2007 XN_{61}	—	December 4, 2007	Kitt Peak	Spacewatch	·	2.9 km	MPC · JPL
704038	2007 XQ_{61}	—	September 4, 2014	Haleakala	Pan-STARRS 1	·	910 m	MPC · JPL
704039	2007 XF_{62}	—	December 6, 2007	Mount Lemmon	Mount Lemmon Survey	AGN	1.1 km	MPC · JPL
704040	2007 XJ_{63}	—	December 5, 2007	Kitt Peak	Spacewatch	·	620 m	MPC · JPL
704041	2007 XW_{64}	—	September 19, 2017	Haleakala	Pan-STARRS 1	·	620 m	MPC · JPL
704042	2007 XD_{66}	—	July 9, 2015	Haleakala	Pan-STARRS 1	·	1.3 km	MPC · JPL
704043	2007 XP_{67}	—	November 29, 2014	Mount Lemmon	Mount Lemmon Survey	·	810 m	MPC · JPL
704044	2007 XH_{68}	—	May 19, 2017	Haleakala	Pan-STARRS 1	·	990 m	MPC · JPL
704045	2007 XZ_{69}	—	December 5, 2007	Mount Lemmon	Mount Lemmon Survey	·	1.8 km	MPC · JPL
704046	2007 XH_{70}	—	December 3, 2007	Kitt Peak	Spacewatch	·	1.7 km	MPC · JPL
704047	2007 XR_{71}	—	December 4, 2007	Mount Lemmon	Mount Lemmon Survey	·	1.4 km	MPC · JPL
704048	2007 XW_{71}	—	December 5, 2007	Kitt Peak	Spacewatch	·	870 m	MPC · JPL
704049	2007 YW_{2}	—	December 17, 2007	Bergisch Gladbach	W. Bickel	·	1.6 km	MPC · JPL
704050	2007 YH_{11}	—	December 17, 2007	Mount Lemmon	Mount Lemmon Survey	·	1.5 km	MPC · JPL
704051	2007 YN_{12}	—	December 17, 2007	Mount Lemmon	Mount Lemmon Survey	·	1.1 km	MPC · JPL
704052	2007 YZ_{12}	—	December 17, 2007	Mount Lemmon	Mount Lemmon Survey	·	970 m	MPC · JPL
704053	2007 YE_{16}	—	December 16, 2007	Kitt Peak	Spacewatch	·	790 m	MPC · JPL
704054	2007 YC_{17}	—	December 16, 2007	Kitt Peak	Spacewatch	·	900 m	MPC · JPL
704055	2007 YY_{18}	—	December 16, 2007	Kitt Peak	Spacewatch	·	1.7 km	MPC · JPL
704056	2007 YY_{20}	—	December 16, 2007	Mount Lemmon	Mount Lemmon Survey	·	1.5 km	MPC · JPL
704057	2007 YY_{21}	—	May 18, 2015	Haleakala	Pan-STARRS 1	·	2.8 km	MPC · JPL
704058	2007 YA_{22}	—	December 16, 2007	Kitt Peak	Spacewatch	NYS	850 m	MPC · JPL
704059	2007 YA_{29}	—	December 5, 2007	Kitt Peak	Spacewatch	·	1.8 km	MPC · JPL
704060	2007 YX_{39}	—	December 30, 2007	Mount Lemmon	Mount Lemmon Survey	·	1.4 km	MPC · JPL
704061	2007 YM_{51}	—	December 18, 2007	Kitt Peak	Spacewatch	·	1.9 km	MPC · JPL
704062	2007 YV_{69}	—	December 30, 2007	Mount Lemmon	Mount Lemmon Survey	·	1.6 km	MPC · JPL
704063	2007 YD_{75}	—	December 17, 2007	Mount Lemmon	Mount Lemmon Survey	PAD	1.3 km	MPC · JPL
704064	2007 YP_{75}	—	December 18, 2007	Kitt Peak	Spacewatch	AGN	950 m	MPC · JPL
704065	2007 YU_{75}	—	December 19, 2007	Mount Lemmon	Mount Lemmon Survey	·	1.2 km	MPC · JPL
704066	2007 YD_{76}	—	December 16, 2007	Mount Lemmon	Mount Lemmon Survey	KON	1.8 km	MPC · JPL
704067	2007 YX_{76}	—	December 19, 2007	Mount Lemmon	Mount Lemmon Survey	·	2.0 km	MPC · JPL
704068	2007 YC_{77}	—	December 19, 2007	Mount Lemmon	Mount Lemmon Survey	·	1.6 km	MPC · JPL
704069	2007 YM_{77}	—	December 30, 2007	Mount Lemmon	Mount Lemmon Survey	·	1.7 km	MPC · JPL
704070	2007 YH_{78}	—	December 30, 2007	Kitt Peak	Spacewatch	V	670 m	MPC · JPL
704071	2007 YV_{78}	—	October 20, 2011	Mount Lemmon	Mount Lemmon Survey	·	1.5 km	MPC · JPL
704072	2007 YG_{79}	—	September 19, 2011	Haleakala	Pan-STARRS 1	GEF	1.2 km	MPC · JPL
704073	2007 YL_{79}	—	February 16, 2012	Haleakala	Pan-STARRS 1	·	690 m	MPC · JPL
704074	2007 YV_{79}	—	September 25, 2015	Haleakala	Pan-STARRS 1	·	1.9 km	MPC · JPL
704075	2007 YX_{79}	—	November 28, 2014	Kitt Peak	Spacewatch	·	720 m	MPC · JPL
704076	2007 YD_{80}	—	December 21, 2012	Mount Lemmon	Mount Lemmon Survey	·	1.6 km	MPC · JPL
704077	2007 YJ_{80}	—	December 16, 2007	Mount Lemmon	Mount Lemmon Survey	·	2.7 km	MPC · JPL
704078	2007 YX_{80}	—	December 16, 2007	Kitt Peak	Spacewatch	·	1.2 km	MPC · JPL
704079	2007 YB_{81}	—	December 30, 2007	Mount Lemmon	Mount Lemmon Survey	EUN	960 m	MPC · JPL
704080	2007 YL_{82}	—	February 27, 2012	Haleakala	Pan-STARRS 1	·	1.1 km	MPC · JPL
704081	2007 YS_{82}	—	December 31, 2007	Kitt Peak	Spacewatch	NYS	880 m	MPC · JPL
704082	2007 YC_{83}	—	October 21, 2007	Kitt Peak	Spacewatch	EOS	1.8 km	MPC · JPL
704083	2007 YL_{83}	—	December 11, 2013	Haleakala	Pan-STARRS 1	·	2.4 km	MPC · JPL
704084	2007 YW_{86}	—	September 6, 2015	Haleakala	Pan-STARRS 1	KOR	1.0 km	MPC · JPL
704085	2007 YZ_{86}	—	December 6, 2007	Charleston	R. Holmes	·	1.7 km	MPC · JPL
704086	2007 YO_{88}	—	December 17, 2007	Mount Lemmon	Mount Lemmon Survey	(16286)	1.7 km	MPC · JPL
704087	2007 YP_{88}	—	May 13, 2009	Mount Lemmon	Mount Lemmon Survey	PAD	1.4 km	MPC · JPL
704088	2007 YJ_{89}	—	October 2, 2010	Kitt Peak	Spacewatch	·	760 m	MPC · JPL
704089	2007 YM_{91}	—	December 18, 2007	Mount Lemmon	Mount Lemmon Survey	V	530 m	MPC · JPL
704090	2007 YH_{93}	—	December 18, 2007	Mount Lemmon	Mount Lemmon Survey	·	1.8 km	MPC · JPL
704091	2007 YS_{93}	—	December 17, 2007	Kitt Peak	Spacewatch	·	1.5 km	MPC · JPL
704092	2007 YU_{93}	—	December 20, 2007	Mount Lemmon	Mount Lemmon Survey	·	1.7 km	MPC · JPL
704093	2007 YC_{94}	—	December 31, 2007	Kitt Peak	Spacewatch	·	1.1 km	MPC · JPL
704094	2007 YF_{96}	—	December 30, 2007	Kitt Peak	Spacewatch	·	1 km	MPC · JPL
704095	2007 YC_{98}	—	December 17, 2007	Mount Lemmon	Mount Lemmon Survey	·	1.5 km	MPC · JPL
704096	2008 AF_{1}	—	January 1, 2008	Bergisch Gladbach	W. Bickel	·	1.4 km	MPC · JPL
704097	2008 AJ_{10}	—	December 31, 2007	Kitt Peak	Spacewatch	·	2.4 km	MPC · JPL
704098	2008 AN_{10}	—	January 10, 2008	Mount Lemmon	Mount Lemmon Survey	·	1.4 km	MPC · JPL
704099	2008 AO_{13}	—	January 10, 2008	Mount Lemmon	Mount Lemmon Survey	·	1.6 km	MPC · JPL
704100	2008 AP_{13}	—	January 10, 2008	Mount Lemmon	Mount Lemmon Survey	AEO	860 m	MPC · JPL

== 704101–704200 ==
back to top

Designation			Discovery			Properties		Ref
Permanent	Provisional	Named after	Date	Site	Discoverer(s)	Category	Diam.	Ref
704101	2008 AO_{15}	—	December 31, 2007	Kitt Peak	Spacewatch	AGN	940 m	MPC · JPL
704102	2008 AV_{15}	—	September 15, 2006	Kitt Peak	Spacewatch	·	1.1 km	MPC · JPL
704103	2008 AL_{21}	—	September 27, 2006	Catalina	CSS	·	1.6 km	MPC · JPL
704104	2008 AD_{24}	—	January 10, 2008	Mount Lemmon	Mount Lemmon Survey	·	640 m	MPC · JPL
704105	2008 AV_{30}	—	December 30, 2007	Kitt Peak	Spacewatch	(13314)	1.7 km	MPC · JPL
704106	2008 AN_{40}	—	January 10, 2008	Mount Lemmon	Mount Lemmon Survey	·	880 m	MPC · JPL
704107	2008 AH_{54}	—	January 11, 2008	Kitt Peak	Spacewatch	MAS	600 m	MPC · JPL
704108	2008 AJ_{58}	—	September 28, 2006	Kitt Peak	Spacewatch	KOR	1.0 km	MPC · JPL
704109	2008 AT_{60}	—	September 16, 2006	Kitt Peak	Spacewatch	AGN	930 m	MPC · JPL
704110	2008 AG_{67}	—	January 11, 2008	Kitt Peak	Spacewatch	·	1.0 km	MPC · JPL
704111	2008 AC_{68}	—	January 11, 2008	Kitt Peak	Spacewatch	·	1.8 km	MPC · JPL
704112	2008 AV_{69}	—	February 8, 2000	Apache Point	SDSS Collaboration	·	1.8 km	MPC · JPL
704113	2008 AG_{71}	—	January 12, 2008	Kitt Peak	Spacewatch	GEF	950 m	MPC · JPL
704114	2008 AN_{71}	—	December 30, 2007	Kitt Peak	Spacewatch	3:2	3.8 km	MPC · JPL
704115	2008 AU_{71}	—	December 31, 2007	Mount Lemmon	Mount Lemmon Survey	·	1.9 km	MPC · JPL
704116	2008 AE_{77}	—	January 12, 2008	Kitt Peak	Spacewatch	·	1.1 km	MPC · JPL
704117	2008 AQ_{87}	—	November 11, 2007	Mount Lemmon	Mount Lemmon Survey	·	1.0 km	MPC · JPL
704118	2008 AV_{89}	—	January 13, 2008	Kitt Peak	Spacewatch	HOF	2.4 km	MPC · JPL
704119	2008 AW_{91}	—	January 14, 2008	Kitt Peak	Spacewatch	WIT	850 m	MPC · JPL
704120	2008 AG_{111}	—	January 15, 2008	Kitt Peak	Spacewatch	HOF	2.3 km	MPC · JPL
704121	2008 AH_{122}	—	December 30, 2007	Kitt Peak	Spacewatch	·	720 m	MPC · JPL
704122	2008 AP_{123}	—	January 30, 2008	Mount Lemmon	Mount Lemmon Survey	·	1.7 km	MPC · JPL
704123	2008 AL_{127}	—	October 24, 2003	Apache Point	SDSS Collaboration	·	660 m	MPC · JPL
704124	2008 AA_{133}	—	January 6, 2008	Mauna Kea	P. A. Wiegert, A. M. Gilbert	MAS	640 m	MPC · JPL
704125	2008 AH_{135}	—	January 11, 2008	Mount Lemmon	Mount Lemmon Survey	·	1.7 km	MPC · JPL
704126	2008 AS_{140}	—	January 1, 2008	Kitt Peak	Spacewatch	·	620 m	MPC · JPL
704127	2008 AZ_{140}	—	January 2, 2012	Mount Lemmon	Mount Lemmon Survey	·	990 m	MPC · JPL
704128	2008 AF_{141}	—	January 15, 2008	Mount Lemmon	Mount Lemmon Survey	·	1.9 km	MPC · JPL
704129	2008 AU_{141}	—	February 23, 2012	Catalina	CSS	·	1.2 km	MPC · JPL
704130	2008 AY_{141}	—	January 1, 2008	Kitt Peak	Spacewatch	BRA	1.2 km	MPC · JPL
704131	2008 AK_{142}	—	September 24, 2011	Mayhill-ISON	L. Elenin	·	1.5 km	MPC · JPL
704132	2008 AS_{142}	—	January 15, 2008	Kitt Peak	Spacewatch	·	1.9 km	MPC · JPL
704133	2008 AY_{142}	—	January 18, 2013	Charleston	R. Holmes	·	1.5 km	MPC · JPL
704134	2008 AE_{144}	—	October 28, 2010	Mount Lemmon	Mount Lemmon Survey	·	570 m	MPC · JPL
704135	2008 AJ_{144}	—	February 24, 2009	Mount Lemmon	Mount Lemmon Survey	(18466)	2.5 km	MPC · JPL
704136	2008 AL_{144}	—	November 24, 2011	Mount Lemmon	Mount Lemmon Survey	·	1.1 km	MPC · JPL
704137	2008 AH_{146}	—	July 25, 2017	Haleakala	Pan-STARRS 1	·	1 km	MPC · JPL
704138	2008 AH_{147}	—	September 18, 2010	Mount Lemmon	Mount Lemmon Survey	·	510 m	MPC · JPL
704139	2008 AX_{147}	—	July 25, 2017	Haleakala	Pan-STARRS 1	V	430 m	MPC · JPL
704140	2008 AN_{148}	—	January 18, 2013	Kitt Peak	Spacewatch	·	1.7 km	MPC · JPL
704141	2008 AY_{148}	—	September 19, 2011	Haleakala	Pan-STARRS 1	·	1.2 km	MPC · JPL
704142	2008 AC_{149}	—	January 17, 2013	Mount Lemmon	Mount Lemmon Survey	·	1.8 km	MPC · JPL
704143	2008 AG_{150}	—	January 1, 2008	Kitt Peak	Spacewatch	·	1.6 km	MPC · JPL
704144	2008 AW_{151}	—	January 1, 2008	Mount Lemmon	Mount Lemmon Survey	·	2.1 km	MPC · JPL
704145	2008 AP_{152}	—	January 11, 2008	Kitt Peak	Spacewatch	·	1.5 km	MPC · JPL
704146	2008 AB_{153}	—	January 10, 2008	Mount Lemmon	Mount Lemmon Survey	·	1.5 km	MPC · JPL
704147	2008 AW_{155}	—	January 11, 2008	Kitt Peak	Spacewatch	·	1.6 km	MPC · JPL
704148	2008 AH_{156}	—	January 15, 2008	Mount Lemmon	Mount Lemmon Survey	V	500 m	MPC · JPL
704149	2008 AT_{157}	—	January 1, 2008	Kitt Peak	Spacewatch	V	540 m	MPC · JPL
704150	2008 AX_{157}	—	January 11, 2008	Kitt Peak	Spacewatch	NEM	1.7 km	MPC · JPL
704151	2008 BM	—	January 16, 2008	Mount Lemmon	Mount Lemmon Survey	·	3.3 km	MPC · JPL
704152	2008 BM_{1}	—	January 16, 2008	Kitt Peak	Spacewatch	MRX	910 m	MPC · JPL
704153	2008 BG_{3}	—	January 16, 2008	Kitt Peak	Spacewatch	·	2.1 km	MPC · JPL
704154	2008 BP_{14}	—	December 31, 2007	Kitt Peak	Spacewatch	·	1.3 km	MPC · JPL
704155	2008 BT_{16}	—	January 20, 2008	Kitt Peak	Spacewatch	·	1.1 km	MPC · JPL
704156	2008 BF_{22}	—	January 31, 2008	Mount Lemmon	Mount Lemmon Survey	ADE	1.8 km	MPC · JPL
704157	2008 BH_{22}	—	February 15, 1997	Kitt Peak	Spacewatch	TIR	2.3 km	MPC · JPL
704158	2008 BB_{27}	—	January 30, 2008	Mount Lemmon	Mount Lemmon Survey	·	450 m	MPC · JPL
704159	2008 BU_{28}	—	January 30, 2008	Mount Lemmon	Mount Lemmon Survey	HOF	2.0 km	MPC · JPL
704160	2008 BF_{54}	—	October 13, 2010	Kitt Peak	Spacewatch	·	820 m	MPC · JPL
704161	2008 BZ_{55}	—	January 18, 2008	Kitt Peak	Spacewatch	·	1.9 km	MPC · JPL
704162	2008 BG_{57}	—	July 8, 2014	Haleakala	Pan-STARRS 1	·	1.7 km	MPC · JPL
704163	2008 BU_{58}	—	July 4, 2017	Haleakala	Pan-STARRS 1	·	3.1 km	MPC · JPL
704164	2008 BW_{59}	—	January 30, 2008	Mount Lemmon	Mount Lemmon Survey	PAD	1.2 km	MPC · JPL
704165	2008 BW_{60}	—	January 20, 2008	Kitt Peak	Spacewatch	·	2.0 km	MPC · JPL
704166	2008 CR	—	February 2, 2008	Pla D'Arguines	R. Ferrando, Ferrando, M.	MAR	1.1 km	MPC · JPL
704167	2008 CN_{2}	—	February 1, 2008	Kitt Peak	Spacewatch	·	2.0 km	MPC · JPL
704168	2008 CJ_{15}	—	February 3, 2008	Kitt Peak	Spacewatch	BRA	1.4 km	MPC · JPL
704169	2008 CT_{24}	—	February 1, 2008	Kitt Peak	Spacewatch	MAS	640 m	MPC · JPL
704170	2008 CR_{30}	—	January 11, 2008	Kitt Peak	Spacewatch	MAS	540 m	MPC · JPL
704171	2008 CO_{42}	—	October 3, 2006	Mount Lemmon	Mount Lemmon Survey	V	580 m	MPC · JPL
704172	2008 CS_{51}	—	December 31, 2007	Kitt Peak	Spacewatch	·	1.6 km	MPC · JPL
704173	2008 CU_{52}	—	February 7, 2008	Kitt Peak	Spacewatch	HYG	2.5 km	MPC · JPL
704174	2008 CO_{57}	—	February 7, 2008	Mount Lemmon	Mount Lemmon Survey	·	1.4 km	MPC · JPL
704175	2008 CN_{58}	—	September 18, 2006	Kitt Peak	Spacewatch	·	1.4 km	MPC · JPL
704176	2008 CV_{60}	—	February 7, 2008	Mount Lemmon	Mount Lemmon Survey	·	980 m	MPC · JPL
704177	2008 CZ_{64}	—	August 19, 2006	Kitt Peak	Spacewatch	·	860 m	MPC · JPL
704178	2008 CK_{65}	—	February 8, 2008	Mount Lemmon	Mount Lemmon Survey	·	1.3 km	MPC · JPL
704179	2008 CB_{66}	—	February 8, 2008	Mount Lemmon	Mount Lemmon Survey	·	1.5 km	MPC · JPL
704180	2008 CL_{66}	—	February 8, 2008	Mount Lemmon	Mount Lemmon Survey	KOR	1.1 km	MPC · JPL
704181	2008 CE_{69}	—	February 8, 2008	Bergisch Gladbach	W. Bickel	·	1.2 km	MPC · JPL
704182	2008 CR_{71}	—	January 30, 2008	Catalina	CSS	·	1.7 km	MPC · JPL
704183	2008 CN_{74}	—	February 9, 2008	Bergisch Gladbach	W. Bickel	·	650 m	MPC · JPL
704184	2008 CS_{75}	—	February 3, 2008	Mount Lemmon	Mount Lemmon Survey	AGN	1.1 km	MPC · JPL
704185	2008 CE_{81}	—	October 22, 2006	Kitt Peak	Spacewatch	·	1.4 km	MPC · JPL
704186	2008 CX_{81}	—	November 26, 2003	Kitt Peak	Spacewatch	·	770 m	MPC · JPL
704187	2008 CF_{83}	—	February 7, 2008	Kitt Peak	Spacewatch	·	950 m	MPC · JPL
704188	2008 CQ_{90}	—	February 8, 2008	Kitt Peak	Spacewatch	·	730 m	MPC · JPL
704189	2008 CY_{94}	—	February 8, 2008	Mount Lemmon	Mount Lemmon Survey	·	880 m	MPC · JPL
704190	2008 CY_{100}	—	February 9, 2008	Mount Lemmon	Mount Lemmon Survey	V	570 m	MPC · JPL
704191	2008 CW_{102}	—	October 13, 2006	Kitt Peak	Spacewatch	·	1.6 km	MPC · JPL
704192	2008 CR_{103}	—	February 9, 2008	Kitt Peak	Spacewatch	·	1.7 km	MPC · JPL
704193	2008 CC_{122}	—	February 7, 2008	Mount Lemmon	Mount Lemmon Survey	·	840 m	MPC · JPL
704194	2008 CX_{124}	—	January 30, 2008	Kitt Peak	Spacewatch	·	1.8 km	MPC · JPL
704195	2008 CW_{125}	—	November 8, 2007	Kitt Peak	Spacewatch	(5)	1.2 km	MPC · JPL
704196	2008 CC_{126}	—	January 10, 2008	Kitt Peak	Spacewatch	·	1.8 km	MPC · JPL
704197	2008 CM_{128}	—	February 8, 2008	Kitt Peak	Spacewatch	(194)	1.6 km	MPC · JPL
704198	2008 CP_{134}	—	February 8, 2008	Mount Lemmon	Mount Lemmon Survey	CLA	1.2 km	MPC · JPL
704199	2008 CR_{136}	—	February 8, 2008	Mount Lemmon	Mount Lemmon Survey	·	1.8 km	MPC · JPL
704200	2008 CX_{136}	—	February 8, 2008	Mount Lemmon	Mount Lemmon Survey	·	1.3 km	MPC · JPL

== 704201–704300 ==
back to top

Designation			Discovery			Properties		Ref
Permanent	Provisional	Named after	Date	Site	Discoverer(s)	Category	Diam.	Ref
704201	2008 CY_{136}	—	October 13, 2006	Kitt Peak	Spacewatch	·	1.8 km	MPC · JPL
704202	2008 CS_{142}	—	February 8, 2008	Kitt Peak	Spacewatch	·	1.1 km	MPC · JPL
704203	2008 CQ_{149}	—	February 9, 2008	Kitt Peak	Spacewatch	·	2.6 km	MPC · JPL
704204	2008 CE_{152}	—	February 9, 2008	Kitt Peak	Spacewatch	·	830 m	MPC · JPL
704205	2008 CD_{155}	—	February 9, 2008	Mount Lemmon	Mount Lemmon Survey	·	2.0 km	MPC · JPL
704206	2008 CJ_{165}	—	February 10, 2008	Kitt Peak	Spacewatch	·	1.5 km	MPC · JPL
704207	2008 CY_{167}	—	February 11, 2008	Mount Lemmon	Mount Lemmon Survey	V	480 m	MPC · JPL
704208	2008 CB_{168}	—	February 11, 2008	Mount Lemmon	Mount Lemmon Survey	·	590 m	MPC · JPL
704209	2008 CS_{170}	—	February 12, 2008	Mount Lemmon	Mount Lemmon Survey	DOR	2.0 km	MPC · JPL
704210	2008 CJ_{171}	—	February 12, 2008	Mount Lemmon	Mount Lemmon Survey	·	590 m	MPC · JPL
704211	2008 CL_{171}	—	February 12, 2008	Mount Lemmon	Mount Lemmon Survey	·	2.0 km	MPC · JPL
704212	2008 CT_{176}	—	January 20, 2008	Mount Lemmon	Mount Lemmon Survey	·	1.4 km	MPC · JPL
704213	2008 CX_{183}	—	November 24, 2003	Kitt Peak	Spacewatch	(2076)	650 m	MPC · JPL
704214	2008 CQ_{185}	—	February 1, 2008	Catalina	CSS	JUN	970 m	MPC · JPL
704215	2008 CS_{185}	—	March 15, 2004	Junk Bond	D. Healy	·	1.5 km	MPC · JPL
704216	2008 CE_{193}	—	February 8, 2008	Kitt Peak	Spacewatch	GAL	1.3 km	MPC · JPL
704217	2008 CM_{193}	—	February 3, 2008	Kitt Peak	Spacewatch	·	1.3 km	MPC · JPL
704218	2008 CF_{207}	—	February 12, 2008	Kitt Peak	Spacewatch	·	1.2 km	MPC · JPL
704219	2008 CZ_{211}	—	February 7, 2008	Mount Lemmon	Mount Lemmon Survey	H	460 m	MPC · JPL
704220	2008 CW_{212}	—	December 8, 2012	Mount Lemmon	Mount Lemmon Survey	·	1.8 km	MPC · JPL
704221	2008 CQ_{213}	—	February 10, 2008	Kitt Peak	Spacewatch	·	2.1 km	MPC · JPL
704222	2008 CS_{216}	—	January 10, 2008	Mount Lemmon	Mount Lemmon Survey	HOF	1.9 km	MPC · JPL
704223	2008 CV_{218}	—	September 30, 2006	Catalina	CSS	·	1.6 km	MPC · JPL
704224	2008 CY_{218}	—	February 11, 2008	Mount Lemmon	Mount Lemmon Survey	·	1.5 km	MPC · JPL
704225	2008 CA_{219}	—	February 12, 2008	Mount Lemmon	Mount Lemmon Survey	·	1.9 km	MPC · JPL
704226	2008 CT_{219}	—	February 12, 2008	Mount Lemmon	Mount Lemmon Survey	·	840 m	MPC · JPL
704227	2008 CD_{221}	—	February 7, 2008	Kitt Peak	Spacewatch	·	1.7 km	MPC · JPL
704228	2008 CG_{221}	—	April 12, 2013	Haleakala	Pan-STARRS 1	·	1.3 km	MPC · JPL
704229	2008 CH_{221}	—	September 19, 2014	Haleakala	Pan-STARRS 1	·	1.0 km	MPC · JPL
704230	2008 CV_{222}	—	September 1, 1994	Kitt Peak	Spacewatch	·	1.1 km	MPC · JPL
704231	2008 CV_{224}	—	February 5, 2013	Kitt Peak	Spacewatch	(16286)	1.6 km	MPC · JPL
704232	2008 CZ_{225}	—	November 2, 2015	Haleakala	Pan-STARRS 1	·	1.5 km	MPC · JPL
704233	2008 CL_{228}	—	February 2, 2008	Kitt Peak	Spacewatch	·	1.1 km	MPC · JPL
704234	2008 CC_{234}	—	October 10, 2015	Haleakala	Pan-STARRS 1	HOF	2.2 km	MPC · JPL
704235	2008 CO_{234}	—	September 12, 2015	Haleakala	Pan-STARRS 1	AGN	910 m	MPC · JPL
704236	2008 CR_{234}	—	March 21, 2012	Mount Lemmon	Mount Lemmon Survey	NYS	680 m	MPC · JPL
704237	2008 CV_{236}	—	February 12, 2008	Mount Lemmon	Mount Lemmon Survey	·	2.4 km	MPC · JPL
704238	2008 CX_{238}	—	February 12, 2008	Mount Lemmon	Mount Lemmon Survey	·	1.6 km	MPC · JPL
704239	2008 CD_{239}	—	September 30, 2006	Mount Lemmon	Mount Lemmon Survey	KOR	1.2 km	MPC · JPL
704240	2008 CO_{240}	—	February 3, 2008	Mount Lemmon	Mount Lemmon Survey	·	1.5 km	MPC · JPL
704241	2008 CX_{240}	—	February 13, 2008	Mount Lemmon	Mount Lemmon Survey	KOR	1.2 km	MPC · JPL
704242	2008 CS_{243}	—	February 13, 2008	Mount Lemmon	Mount Lemmon Survey	·	1.9 km	MPC · JPL
704243	2008 CV_{245}	—	February 10, 2008	Mount Lemmon	Mount Lemmon Survey	·	1.7 km	MPC · JPL
704244	2008 CN_{246}	—	January 16, 2008	Kitt Peak	Spacewatch	EOS	1.5 km	MPC · JPL
704245	2008 CT_{248}	—	February 13, 2008	Kitt Peak	Spacewatch	·	1.9 km	MPC · JPL
704246	2008 CZ_{248}	—	February 11, 2008	Kitt Peak	Spacewatch	·	1.7 km	MPC · JPL
704247	2008 DJ_{7}	—	January 30, 2008	Mount Lemmon	Mount Lemmon Survey	AGN	1.2 km	MPC · JPL
704248	2008 DK_{9}	—	February 8, 2008	Mount Lemmon	Mount Lemmon Survey	·	1.8 km	MPC · JPL
704249	2008 DU_{11}	—	February 2, 2008	Kitt Peak	Spacewatch	·	650 m	MPC · JPL
704250	2008 DJ_{18}	—	November 19, 2006	Kitt Peak	Spacewatch	KOR	1.3 km	MPC · JPL
704251	2008 DK_{20}	—	February 28, 2008	Mount Lemmon	Mount Lemmon Survey	·	1.6 km	MPC · JPL
704252	2008 DW_{34}	—	February 3, 2008	Catalina	CSS	·	1.3 km	MPC · JPL
704253	2008 DC_{36}	—	February 7, 2008	Mount Lemmon	Mount Lemmon Survey	JUN	1.0 km	MPC · JPL
704254	2008 DV_{41}	—	February 2, 2008	Kitt Peak	Spacewatch	·	1.0 km	MPC · JPL
704255	2008 DQ_{44}	—	February 28, 2008	Mount Lemmon	Mount Lemmon Survey	V	430 m	MPC · JPL
704256	2008 DB_{48}	—	February 28, 2008	Mount Lemmon	Mount Lemmon Survey	·	1.0 km	MPC · JPL
704257	2008 DU_{51}	—	February 29, 2008	Mount Lemmon	Mount Lemmon Survey	·	1.6 km	MPC · JPL
704258	2008 DQ_{52}	—	February 29, 2008	Mount Lemmon	Mount Lemmon Survey	CLA	1.4 km	MPC · JPL
704259	2008 DB_{53}	—	February 29, 2008	Mount Lemmon	Mount Lemmon Survey	·	1.0 km	MPC · JPL
704260	2008 DF_{59}	—	February 7, 2008	Kitt Peak	Spacewatch	·	2.0 km	MPC · JPL
704261	2008 DT_{60}	—	February 13, 2001	Bergisch Gladbach	W. Bickel	·	560 m	MPC · JPL
704262	2008 DG_{65}	—	February 28, 2008	Mount Lemmon	Mount Lemmon Survey	·	1.2 km	MPC · JPL
704263	2008 DB_{72}	—	February 26, 2008	Mount Lemmon	Mount Lemmon Survey	·	910 m	MPC · JPL
704264	2008 DV_{90}	—	February 18, 2008	Mount Lemmon	Mount Lemmon Survey	·	890 m	MPC · JPL
704265	2008 DK_{91}	—	December 1, 2011	Haleakala	Pan-STARRS 1	·	2.3 km	MPC · JPL
704266	2008 DP_{91}	—	December 19, 2007	Mount Lemmon	Mount Lemmon Survey	·	2.1 km	MPC · JPL
704267	2008 DC_{92}	—	September 23, 2015	Haleakala	Pan-STARRS 1	·	1.9 km	MPC · JPL
704268	2008 DO_{92}	—	February 28, 2008	Mount Lemmon	Mount Lemmon Survey	·	2.0 km	MPC · JPL
704269	2008 DA_{94}	—	August 20, 2014	Haleakala	Pan-STARRS 1	H	420 m	MPC · JPL
704270	2008 DS_{94}	—	October 15, 2015	Haleakala	Pan-STARRS 1	·	1.5 km	MPC · JPL
704271	2008 DL_{95}	—	January 27, 2017	Haleakala	Pan-STARRS 1	·	1.4 km	MPC · JPL
704272	2008 DP_{95}	—	October 9, 2010	Mount Lemmon	Mount Lemmon Survey	MAS	560 m	MPC · JPL
704273	2008 DN_{98}	—	February 28, 2008	Kitt Peak	Spacewatch	·	730 m	MPC · JPL
704274	2008 DQ_{98}	—	February 28, 2008	Mount Lemmon	Mount Lemmon Survey	KOR	1.1 km	MPC · JPL
704275	2008 EA_{22}	—	March 2, 2008	Kitt Peak	Spacewatch	JUN	800 m	MPC · JPL
704276	2008 EH_{26}	—	October 21, 2006	Kitt Peak	Spacewatch	·	1.4 km	MPC · JPL
704277	2008 EU_{32}	—	March 16, 2012	Mount Lemmon	Mount Lemmon Survey	·	1.0 km	MPC · JPL
704278	2008 EO_{61}	—	January 31, 2008	Kitt Peak	Spacewatch	·	2.0 km	MPC · JPL
704279	2008 EU_{61}	—	March 9, 2008	Mount Lemmon	Mount Lemmon Survey	EOS	1.3 km	MPC · JPL
704280	2008 EJ_{65}	—	March 9, 2008	Mount Lemmon	Mount Lemmon Survey	·	1.0 km	MPC · JPL
704281	2008 EX_{66}	—	March 9, 2008	Mount Lemmon	Mount Lemmon Survey	·	1.4 km	MPC · JPL
704282	2008 EA_{74}	—	March 7, 2008	Kitt Peak	Spacewatch	·	1.7 km	MPC · JPL
704283	2008 ES_{77}	—	March 7, 2008	Kitt Peak	Spacewatch	·	1.9 km	MPC · JPL
704284	2008 EN_{97}	—	March 10, 2008	Mount Lemmon	Mount Lemmon Survey	·	740 m	MPC · JPL
704285	2008 EZ_{100}	—	March 7, 2008	Nyukasa	Nyukasa	·	970 m	MPC · JPL
704286	2008 EP_{101}	—	February 9, 2008	Kitt Peak	Spacewatch	·	1.1 km	MPC · JPL
704287	2008 EB_{106}	—	March 6, 2008	Mount Lemmon	Mount Lemmon Survey	·	970 m	MPC · JPL
704288	2008 EM_{107}	—	March 6, 2008	Mount Lemmon	Mount Lemmon Survey	·	1.7 km	MPC · JPL
704289	2008 ES_{108}	—	February 13, 2008	Kitt Peak	Spacewatch	BRA	1.2 km	MPC · JPL
704290	2008 ET_{108}	—	March 7, 2008	Mount Lemmon	Mount Lemmon Survey	KOR	1.1 km	MPC · JPL
704291	2008 EB_{114}	—	March 8, 2008	Kitt Peak	Spacewatch	EUN	1.0 km	MPC · JPL
704292	2008 EE_{115}	—	March 8, 2008	Kitt Peak	Spacewatch	·	1.7 km	MPC · JPL
704293	2008 EG_{115}	—	March 8, 2008	Kitt Peak	Spacewatch	·	960 m	MPC · JPL
704294	2008 ER_{118}	—	March 9, 2008	Mount Lemmon	Mount Lemmon Survey	PHO	840 m	MPC · JPL
704295	2008 EF_{122}	—	March 9, 2008	Kitt Peak	Spacewatch	·	1.1 km	MPC · JPL
704296	2008 EJ_{125}	—	March 10, 2008	Mount Lemmon	Mount Lemmon Survey	·	1.7 km	MPC · JPL
704297	2008 EQ_{126}	—	January 18, 2013	Kitt Peak	Spacewatch	EOS	1.3 km	MPC · JPL
704298	2008 EL_{128}	—	March 11, 2008	Kitt Peak	Spacewatch	HOF	2.2 km	MPC · JPL
704299	2008 EE_{137}	—	December 21, 2003	Kitt Peak	Spacewatch	NYS	810 m	MPC · JPL
704300	2008 EW_{142}	—	March 13, 2008	Kitt Peak	Spacewatch	·	1.2 km	MPC · JPL

== 704301–704400 ==
back to top

Designation			Discovery			Properties		Ref
Permanent	Provisional	Named after	Date	Site	Discoverer(s)	Category	Diam.	Ref
704301	2008 EG_{144}	—	March 11, 2008	Kitt Peak	Spacewatch	·	650 m	MPC · JPL
704302	2008 EX_{146}	—	February 28, 2008	Mount Lemmon	Mount Lemmon Survey	·	1.7 km	MPC · JPL
704303	2008 EF_{151}	—	March 26, 2008	Mount Lemmon	Mount Lemmon Survey	V	500 m	MPC · JPL
704304	2008 ED_{156}	—	March 8, 2008	Mount Lemmon	Mount Lemmon Survey	·	1.3 km	MPC · JPL
704305	2008 EH_{160}	—	May 27, 2003	Anderson Mesa	LONEOS	EUP	3.1 km	MPC · JPL
704306	2008 EJ_{172}	—	September 9, 2013	La Sagra	OAM	NYS	1.3 km	MPC · JPL
704307	2008 EX_{172}	—	March 11, 2008	Kitt Peak	Spacewatch	·	670 m	MPC · JPL
704308	2008 EA_{173}	—	August 14, 2013	Haleakala	Pan-STARRS 1	V	560 m	MPC · JPL
704309	2008 ED_{173}	—	June 24, 2009	Mount Lemmon	Mount Lemmon Survey	MAS	740 m	MPC · JPL
704310	2008 EK_{177}	—	March 13, 2008	Kitt Peak	Spacewatch	BRA	1.1 km	MPC · JPL
704311	2008 ES_{177}	—	March 15, 2008	Mount Lemmon	Mount Lemmon Survey	H	320 m	MPC · JPL
704312	2008 ED_{178}	—	May 7, 2014	Haleakala	Pan-STARRS 1	·	1.9 km	MPC · JPL
704313	2008 EK_{178}	—	March 24, 2015	Kitt Peak	Spacewatch	·	610 m	MPC · JPL
704314	2008 EO_{181}	—	March 10, 2008	Mount Lemmon	Mount Lemmon Survey	·	1.1 km	MPC · JPL
704315	2008 EA_{182}	—	March 12, 2008	Kitt Peak	Spacewatch	·	1.4 km	MPC · JPL
704316	2008 EJ_{183}	—	March 6, 2008	Mount Lemmon	Mount Lemmon Survey	·	990 m	MPC · JPL
704317	2008 EJ_{184}	—	November 21, 2014	Haleakala	Pan-STARRS 1	NYS	820 m	MPC · JPL
704318	2008 EF_{186}	—	August 8, 2016	Haleakala	Pan-STARRS 1	·	2.7 km	MPC · JPL
704319	2008 EE_{187}	—	March 8, 2008	Mount Lemmon	Mount Lemmon Survey	NYS	980 m	MPC · JPL
704320	2008 ES_{188}	—	December 9, 2015	Haleakala	Pan-STARRS 1	·	1.3 km	MPC · JPL
704321	2008 EM_{189}	—	January 4, 2011	Mount Lemmon	Mount Lemmon Survey	·	640 m	MPC · JPL
704322	2008 EK_{190}	—	March 10, 2008	Mount Lemmon	Mount Lemmon Survey	·	1.5 km	MPC · JPL
704323	2008 EC_{191}	—	March 1, 2008	Kitt Peak	Spacewatch	·	1.3 km	MPC · JPL
704324	2008 EB_{192}	—	March 1, 2008	Kitt Peak	Spacewatch	NYS	970 m	MPC · JPL
704325	2008 EE_{192}	—	March 10, 2008	Kitt Peak	Spacewatch	·	980 m	MPC · JPL
704326	2008 EO_{198}	—	March 8, 2008	Mount Lemmon	Mount Lemmon Survey	·	2.0 km	MPC · JPL
704327	2008 FV_{6}	—	January 13, 2004	Kitt Peak	Spacewatch	·	650 m	MPC · JPL
704328	2008 FU_{9}	—	February 26, 2008	Mount Lemmon	Mount Lemmon Survey	·	1.3 km	MPC · JPL
704329	2008 FP_{11}	—	November 1, 2006	Kitt Peak	Spacewatch	·	2.2 km	MPC · JPL
704330	2008 FE_{14}	—	March 26, 2008	Mount Lemmon	Mount Lemmon Survey	KOR	1.2 km	MPC · JPL
704331	2008 FR_{16}	—	March 27, 2008	Kitt Peak	Spacewatch	KOR	1.2 km	MPC · JPL
704332	2008 FN_{24}	—	March 27, 2008	Kitt Peak	Spacewatch	·	1.0 km	MPC · JPL
704333	2008 FJ_{36}	—	February 7, 2008	Mount Lemmon	Mount Lemmon Survey	·	2.0 km	MPC · JPL
704334	2008 FV_{42}	—	February 27, 2008	Mount Lemmon	Mount Lemmon Survey	MAS	630 m	MPC · JPL
704335	2008 FF_{43}	—	March 28, 2008	Mount Lemmon	Mount Lemmon Survey	TRE	1.8 km	MPC · JPL
704336	2008 FZ_{47}	—	March 1, 2008	Kitt Peak	Spacewatch	NYS	880 m	MPC · JPL
704337	2008 FS_{57}	—	March 28, 2008	Mount Lemmon	Mount Lemmon Survey	·	1.6 km	MPC · JPL
704338	2008 FC_{59}	—	March 29, 2008	Kitt Peak	Spacewatch	HOF	2.1 km	MPC · JPL
704339	2008 FS_{59}	—	March 29, 2008	Mount Lemmon	Mount Lemmon Survey	H	390 m	MPC · JPL
704340	2008 FG_{72}	—	December 12, 2006	Kitt Peak	Spacewatch	KOR	1.1 km	MPC · JPL
704341	2008 FN_{81}	—	March 27, 2008	Mount Lemmon	Mount Lemmon Survey	HOF	1.9 km	MPC · JPL
704342	2008 FX_{81}	—	March 27, 2008	Mount Lemmon	Mount Lemmon Survey	·	1.6 km	MPC · JPL
704343	2008 FN_{87}	—	March 28, 2008	Kitt Peak	Spacewatch	·	1.5 km	MPC · JPL
704344	2008 FE_{91}	—	February 24, 2008	Mount Lemmon	Mount Lemmon Survey	·	1.1 km	MPC · JPL
704345	2008 FK_{91}	—	February 28, 2008	Mount Lemmon	Mount Lemmon Survey	·	920 m	MPC · JPL
704346	2008 FG_{97}	—	March 30, 2008	Kitt Peak	Spacewatch	·	510 m	MPC · JPL
704347	2008 FT_{97}	—	March 30, 2008	Kitt Peak	Spacewatch	·	1.8 km	MPC · JPL
704348	2008 FA_{98}	—	October 25, 2005	Kitt Peak	Spacewatch	·	2.0 km	MPC · JPL
704349	2008 FW_{99}	—	March 30, 2008	Kitt Peak	Spacewatch	·	2.4 km	MPC · JPL
704350	2008 FZ_{103}	—	March 30, 2008	Kitt Peak	Spacewatch	·	1.7 km	MPC · JPL
704351	2008 FU_{119}	—	February 28, 2008	Kitt Peak	Spacewatch	·	1.6 km	MPC · JPL
704352	2008 FR_{128}	—	March 29, 2008	Mount Lemmon	Mount Lemmon Survey	·	2.2 km	MPC · JPL
704353	2008 FQ_{132}	—	March 28, 2008	Kitt Peak	Spacewatch	L5	7.7 km	MPC · JPL
704354	2008 FO_{134}	—	March 30, 2008	Kitt Peak	Spacewatch	·	1.1 km	MPC · JPL
704355	2008 FD_{139}	—	March 29, 2008	Kitt Peak	Spacewatch	·	1.7 km	MPC · JPL
704356	2008 FA_{140}	—	January 23, 2011	Mount Lemmon	Mount Lemmon Survey	·	590 m	MPC · JPL
704357	2008 FN_{140}	—	August 14, 2001	Haleakala	NEAT	NYS	1.1 km	MPC · JPL
704358	2008 FJ_{142}	—	March 27, 2008	Mount Lemmon	Mount Lemmon Survey	MAS	520 m	MPC · JPL
704359	2008 FF_{144}	—	March 26, 2008	Mount Lemmon	Mount Lemmon Survey	·	880 m	MPC · JPL
704360	2008 FQ_{144}	—	April 15, 2013	Haleakala	Pan-STARRS 1	AGN	960 m	MPC · JPL
704361	2008 FX_{144}	—	December 26, 2014	Haleakala	Pan-STARRS 1	·	1.0 km	MPC · JPL
704362	2008 FF_{146}	—	March 29, 2008	Kitt Peak	Spacewatch	·	1.3 km	MPC · JPL
704363	2008 FH_{146}	—	March 31, 2008	Mount Lemmon	Mount Lemmon Survey	L5	6.1 km	MPC · JPL
704364	2008 FL_{149}	—	March 26, 2008	Mount Lemmon	Mount Lemmon Survey	·	1.5 km	MPC · JPL
704365	2008 FT_{149}	—	March 16, 2008	Kitt Peak	Spacewatch	·	1.0 km	MPC · JPL
704366	2008 FJ_{150}	—	March 26, 2008	Mount Lemmon	Mount Lemmon Survey	·	1.2 km	MPC · JPL
704367	2008 GZ_{6}	—	April 1, 2008	Kitt Peak	Spacewatch	·	910 m	MPC · JPL
704368	2008 GQ_{11}	—	April 1, 2008	Kitt Peak	Spacewatch	MAS	550 m	MPC · JPL
704369	2008 GR_{18}	—	March 5, 2008	Kitt Peak	Spacewatch	·	690 m	MPC · JPL
704370	2008 GR_{28}	—	April 3, 2008	Kitt Peak	Spacewatch	·	1.4 km	MPC · JPL
704371	2008 GR_{44}	—	April 4, 2008	Mount Lemmon	Mount Lemmon Survey	EOS	1.6 km	MPC · JPL
704372	2008 GZ_{44}	—	April 4, 2008	Kitt Peak	Spacewatch	·	1.8 km	MPC · JPL
704373	2008 GC_{49}	—	March 10, 2008	Mount Lemmon	Mount Lemmon Survey	·	1.4 km	MPC · JPL
704374	2008 GF_{50}	—	November 11, 2005	Kitt Peak	Spacewatch	·	1.5 km	MPC · JPL
704375	2008 GW_{52}	—	August 26, 2005	Palomar	NEAT	NYS	970 m	MPC · JPL
704376	2008 GL_{55}	—	April 5, 2008	Mount Lemmon	Mount Lemmon Survey	KOR	1.1 km	MPC · JPL
704377	2008 GO_{56}	—	April 5, 2008	Mount Lemmon	Mount Lemmon Survey	·	1.3 km	MPC · JPL
704378	2008 GX_{58}	—	April 5, 2008	Mount Lemmon	Mount Lemmon Survey	·	1.3 km	MPC · JPL
704379	2008 GT_{61}	—	April 5, 2008	Mount Lemmon	Mount Lemmon Survey	L5	9.4 km	MPC · JPL
704380	2008 GX_{66}	—	April 6, 2008	Mount Lemmon	Mount Lemmon Survey	·	1.7 km	MPC · JPL
704381	2008 GN_{72}	—	March 27, 2008	Mount Lemmon	Mount Lemmon Survey	·	640 m	MPC · JPL
704382	2008 GN_{83}	—	April 8, 2008	Mount Lemmon	Mount Lemmon Survey	MAR	1.0 km	MPC · JPL
704383	2008 GK_{84}	—	April 8, 2008	Mount Lemmon	Mount Lemmon Survey	·	2.0 km	MPC · JPL
704384	2008 GN_{105}	—	March 8, 2008	Kitt Peak	Spacewatch	·	730 m	MPC · JPL
704385	2008 GH_{107}	—	April 12, 2008	Mount Lemmon	Mount Lemmon Survey	·	1.7 km	MPC · JPL
704386	2008 GB_{108}	—	December 27, 2003	Kitt Peak	Spacewatch	NYS	890 m	MPC · JPL
704387	2008 GD_{109}	—	April 13, 2008	Mount Lemmon	Mount Lemmon Survey	·	1.4 km	MPC · JPL
704388	2008 GJ_{113}	—	April 8, 2008	Mount Lemmon	Mount Lemmon Survey	·	1.1 km	MPC · JPL
704389	2008 GW_{118}	—	April 11, 2008	Kitt Peak	Spacewatch	NYS	930 m	MPC · JPL
704390	2008 GN_{119}	—	April 11, 2008	Kitt Peak	Spacewatch	·	1.1 km	MPC · JPL
704391	2008 GX_{134}	—	April 15, 2008	Mount Lemmon	Mount Lemmon Survey	·	580 m	MPC · JPL
704392	2008 GW_{136}	—	April 6, 2008	Kitt Peak	Spacewatch	·	1.4 km	MPC · JPL
704393	2008 GS_{143}	—	April 14, 2008	Mount Lemmon	Mount Lemmon Survey	L5	8.2 km	MPC · JPL
704394	2008 GD_{149}	—	April 8, 2008	Kitt Peak	Spacewatch	·	1.6 km	MPC · JPL
704395	2008 GC_{150}	—	September 27, 2009	Catalina	CSS	·	1.0 km	MPC · JPL
704396	2008 GD_{150}	—	April 5, 2008	Mount Lemmon	Mount Lemmon Survey	·	1.3 km	MPC · JPL
704397	2008 GK_{150}	—	April 14, 2008	Mount Lemmon	Mount Lemmon Survey	L5	8.8 km	MPC · JPL
704398	2008 GV_{150}	—	January 12, 2011	Mount Lemmon	Mount Lemmon Survey	CLA	1.4 km	MPC · JPL
704399	2008 GX_{150}	—	October 8, 2013	Mount Lemmon	Mount Lemmon Survey	·	850 m	MPC · JPL
704400	2008 GJ_{151}	—	July 28, 2009	Kitt Peak	Spacewatch	·	920 m	MPC · JPL

== 704401–704500 ==
back to top

Designation			Discovery			Properties		Ref
Permanent	Provisional	Named after	Date	Site	Discoverer(s)	Category	Diam.	Ref
704401	2008 GL_{151}	—	October 8, 2012	Haleakala	Pan-STARRS 1	·	830 m	MPC · JPL
704402	2008 GA_{152}	—	April 12, 2008	Mount Lemmon	Mount Lemmon Survey	·	700 m	MPC · JPL
704403	2008 GJ_{152}	—	April 13, 2008	Mount Lemmon	Mount Lemmon Survey	·	650 m	MPC · JPL
704404	2008 GR_{152}	—	April 27, 2009	Kitt Peak	Spacewatch	L5	8.5 km	MPC · JPL
704405	2008 GH_{153}	—	October 18, 2011	Mount Lemmon	Mount Lemmon Survey	·	1.6 km	MPC · JPL
704406	2008 GP_{154}	—	September 14, 2010	Mount Lemmon	Mount Lemmon Survey	·	1.8 km	MPC · JPL
704407	2008 GO_{157}	—	October 25, 2009	Kitt Peak	Spacewatch	·	650 m	MPC · JPL
704408	2008 GS_{157}	—	April 15, 2013	Haleakala	Pan-STARRS 1	·	1.8 km	MPC · JPL
704409	2008 GZ_{157}	—	February 21, 2017	Haleakala	Pan-STARRS 1	·	1.4 km	MPC · JPL
704410	2008 GF_{158}	—	April 14, 2008	Mount Lemmon	Mount Lemmon Survey	·	610 m	MPC · JPL
704411	2008 GF_{159}	—	November 26, 2014	Haleakala	Pan-STARRS 1	·	1.4 km	MPC · JPL
704412	2008 GC_{160}	—	April 6, 2008	Mount Lemmon	Mount Lemmon Survey	·	1.0 km	MPC · JPL
704413	2008 GY_{162}	—	April 6, 2008	Mount Lemmon	Mount Lemmon Survey	·	1.6 km	MPC · JPL
704414	2008 GK_{163}	—	April 1, 2008	Mount Lemmon	Mount Lemmon Survey	·	1.5 km	MPC · JPL
704415	2008 GA_{164}	—	July 8, 2014	Haleakala	Pan-STARRS 1	·	1.2 km	MPC · JPL
704416	2008 GD_{165}	—	April 6, 2008	Kitt Peak	Spacewatch	·	1.5 km	MPC · JPL
704417	2008 GY_{165}	—	November 7, 2015	Mount Lemmon	Mount Lemmon Survey	·	1.5 km	MPC · JPL
704418	2008 GR_{166}	—	October 21, 2016	Mount Lemmon	Mount Lemmon Survey	·	1.7 km	MPC · JPL
704419	2008 GH_{167}	—	December 23, 2006	Mount Lemmon	Mount Lemmon Survey	EOS	1.5 km	MPC · JPL
704420	2008 GQ_{167}	—	April 14, 2008	Mount Lemmon	Mount Lemmon Survey	EOS	1.5 km	MPC · JPL
704421	2008 GX_{168}	—	April 14, 2008	Mount Lemmon	Mount Lemmon Survey	·	740 m	MPC · JPL
704422	2008 GZ_{168}	—	April 5, 2008	Kitt Peak	Spacewatch	·	540 m	MPC · JPL
704423	2008 GU_{169}	—	April 3, 2008	Mount Lemmon	Mount Lemmon Survey	EOS	1.4 km	MPC · JPL
704424	2008 GW_{176}	—	April 4, 2008	Kitt Peak	Spacewatch	·	1.7 km	MPC · JPL
704425	2008 GX_{176}	—	April 11, 2008	Mount Lemmon	Mount Lemmon Survey	·	1.5 km	MPC · JPL
704426	2008 GG_{178}	—	April 3, 2008	Mount Lemmon	Mount Lemmon Survey	·	980 m	MPC · JPL
704427	2008 HC_{4}	—	April 14, 2008	Mount Lemmon	Mount Lemmon Survey	·	1.3 km	MPC · JPL
704428	2008 HO_{26}	—	April 27, 2008	Mount Lemmon	Mount Lemmon Survey	·	1.9 km	MPC · JPL
704429	2008 HB_{30}	—	November 12, 2006	Mount Lemmon	Mount Lemmon Survey	·	850 m	MPC · JPL
704430	2008 HT_{35}	—	April 6, 2008	Kitt Peak	Spacewatch	·	1.5 km	MPC · JPL
704431	2008 HJ_{45}	—	April 28, 2008	Mount Lemmon	Mount Lemmon Survey	·	830 m	MPC · JPL
704432	2008 HN_{48}	—	January 10, 2007	Mount Lemmon	Mount Lemmon Survey	·	1.8 km	MPC · JPL
704433	2008 HB_{53}	—	April 29, 2008	Mount Lemmon	Mount Lemmon Survey	·	860 m	MPC · JPL
704434	2008 HE_{55}	—	April 29, 2008	Kitt Peak	Spacewatch	·	1.0 km	MPC · JPL
704435	2008 HA_{61}	—	April 9, 2008	Kitt Peak	Spacewatch	·	1.1 km	MPC · JPL
704436	2008 HQ_{61}	—	April 30, 2008	Mount Lemmon	Mount Lemmon Survey	·	850 m	MPC · JPL
704437	2008 HG_{64}	—	April 29, 2008	Mount Lemmon	Mount Lemmon Survey	·	1.8 km	MPC · JPL
704438	2008 HP_{72}	—	August 13, 2012	Kitt Peak	Spacewatch	L5	8.5 km	MPC · JPL
704439	2008 HZ_{73}	—	March 15, 2012	Mount Lemmon	Mount Lemmon Survey	·	1.9 km	MPC · JPL
704440	2008 HK_{75}	—	February 10, 2011	Mount Lemmon	Mount Lemmon Survey	·	1.0 km	MPC · JPL
704441	2008 HC_{77}	—	April 29, 2008	Mount Lemmon	Mount Lemmon Survey	·	1.2 km	MPC · JPL
704442	2008 JA_{1}	—	April 29, 2008	Mount Lemmon	Mount Lemmon Survey	·	1.6 km	MPC · JPL
704443	2008 JB_{1}	—	April 6, 2008	Kitt Peak	Spacewatch	EOS	1.6 km	MPC · JPL
704444	2008 JQ_{11}	—	April 7, 2008	Kitt Peak	Spacewatch	·	1.9 km	MPC · JPL
704445	2008 JA_{12}	—	May 3, 2008	Kitt Peak	Spacewatch	V	570 m	MPC · JPL
704446	2008 JH_{12}	—	May 3, 2008	Kitt Peak	Spacewatch	L5	8.8 km	MPC · JPL
704447	2008 JW_{22}	—	May 7, 2008	Kitt Peak	Spacewatch	·	1.8 km	MPC · JPL
704448	2008 JA_{27}	—	May 7, 2008	Mount Lemmon	Mount Lemmon Survey	·	2.3 km	MPC · JPL
704449	2008 JU_{39}	—	March 8, 2013	Haleakala	Pan-STARRS 1	·	2.1 km	MPC · JPL
704450	2008 JU_{41}	—	April 5, 2008	Kitt Peak	Spacewatch	L5	8.2 km	MPC · JPL
704451	2008 JY_{41}	—	May 14, 2008	Mount Lemmon	Mount Lemmon Survey	·	1.7 km	MPC · JPL
704452	2008 JJ_{42}	—	November 17, 2009	Mount Lemmon	Mount Lemmon Survey	·	1.3 km	MPC · JPL
704453	2008 JU_{42}	—	May 13, 2008	Kitt Peak	Spacewatch	·	1.1 km	MPC · JPL
704454	2008 JV_{42}	—	May 8, 2008	Kitt Peak	Spacewatch	·	690 m	MPC · JPL
704455	2008 JM_{43}	—	May 3, 2008	Kitt Peak	Spacewatch	·	1.8 km	MPC · JPL
704456	2008 JR_{43}	—	January 2, 2016	Mount Lemmon	Mount Lemmon Survey	EUN	1.1 km	MPC · JPL
704457	2008 JZ_{43}	—	September 9, 2015	Haleakala	Pan-STARRS 1	·	1.4 km	MPC · JPL
704458	2008 JN_{44}	—	May 7, 2014	Haleakala	Pan-STARRS 1	·	2.3 km	MPC · JPL
704459	2008 JD_{46}	—	May 3, 2008	Kitt Peak	Spacewatch	·	1.7 km	MPC · JPL
704460	2008 JF_{46}	—	April 13, 2013	Haleakala	Pan-STARRS 1	·	1.3 km	MPC · JPL
704461	2008 JL_{46}	—	May 14, 2008	Kitt Peak	Spacewatch	·	1.1 km	MPC · JPL
704462	2008 JO_{47}	—	December 6, 2010	Mount Lemmon	Mount Lemmon Survey	·	1.7 km	MPC · JPL
704463	2008 JP_{48}	—	April 16, 2013	Cerro Tololo	DECam	·	1.6 km	MPC · JPL
704464	2008 JU_{49}	—	May 3, 2008	Mount Lemmon	Mount Lemmon Survey	·	1.5 km	MPC · JPL
704465	2008 JM_{50}	—	May 14, 2008	Kitt Peak	Spacewatch	·	1.4 km	MPC · JPL
704466	2008 JO_{50}	—	May 14, 2008	Mount Lemmon	Mount Lemmon Survey	·	1.0 km	MPC · JPL
704467	2008 JV_{50}	—	May 7, 2008	Kitt Peak	Spacewatch	·	1.8 km	MPC · JPL
704468	2008 KL_{16}	—	May 27, 2008	Kitt Peak	Spacewatch	·	2.4 km	MPC · JPL
704469	2008 KX_{21}	—	May 28, 2008	Mount Lemmon	Mount Lemmon Survey	·	1.7 km	MPC · JPL
704470	2008 KN_{26}	—	April 27, 2008	Kitt Peak	Spacewatch	·	650 m	MPC · JPL
704471	2008 KX_{32}	—	May 3, 2008	Kitt Peak	Spacewatch	BRA	1.3 km	MPC · JPL
704472	2008 KS_{34}	—	May 31, 2008	Mount Lemmon	Mount Lemmon Survey	·	1.1 km	MPC · JPL
704473	2008 KM_{44}	—	May 28, 2008	Mount Lemmon	Mount Lemmon Survey	V	540 m	MPC · JPL
704474	2008 KX_{46}	—	January 3, 2016	Mount Lemmon	Mount Lemmon Survey	·	1.8 km	MPC · JPL
704475	2008 KF_{48}	—	November 2, 2010	Mount Lemmon	Mount Lemmon Survey	·	1.5 km	MPC · JPL
704476	2008 KW_{48}	—	May 27, 2008	Mount Lemmon	Mount Lemmon Survey	·	1.7 km	MPC · JPL
704477	2008 KQ_{49}	—	May 29, 2008	Mount Lemmon	Mount Lemmon Survey	·	2.2 km	MPC · JPL
704478	2008 LG_{3}	—	June 1, 2008	Mount Lemmon	Mount Lemmon Survey	PHO	1.2 km	MPC · JPL
704479	2008 LO_{3}	—	June 2, 2008	Kitt Peak	Spacewatch	·	1.7 km	MPC · JPL
704480	2008 LD_{5}	—	June 3, 2008	Mount Lemmon	Mount Lemmon Survey	·	690 m	MPC · JPL
704481	2008 LL_{7}	—	June 3, 2008	Kitt Peak	Spacewatch	·	2.1 km	MPC · JPL
704482	2008 LO_{15}	—	May 3, 2008	Mount Lemmon	Mount Lemmon Survey	·	1.4 km	MPC · JPL
704483	2008 LT_{18}	—	April 6, 2008	Mount Lemmon	Mount Lemmon Survey	EOS	1.6 km	MPC · JPL
704484	2008 LH_{19}	—	June 5, 2016	Haleakala	Pan-STARRS 1	·	990 m	MPC · JPL
704485	2008 LL_{20}	—	July 25, 2014	Haleakala	Pan-STARRS 1	·	2.2 km	MPC · JPL
704486	2008 LK_{21}	—	June 12, 2008	Kitt Peak	Spacewatch	·	1.4 km	MPC · JPL
704487	2008 MF_{3}	—	June 30, 2008	Kitt Peak	Spacewatch	·	760 m	MPC · JPL
704488	2008 ML_{3}	—	June 30, 2008	Kitt Peak	Spacewatch	VER	2.4 km	MPC · JPL
704489	2008 NY_{2}	—	July 10, 2008	La Sagra	OAM	·	1.3 km	MPC · JPL
704490	2008 NX_{5}	—	June 3, 2018	Haleakala	Pan-STARRS 1	URS	2.5 km	MPC · JPL
704491	2008 OO_{2}	—	July 25, 2008	Siding Spring	SSS	·	1.2 km	MPC · JPL
704492	2008 OJ_{5}	—	July 28, 2008	Mount Lemmon	Mount Lemmon Survey	·	2.6 km	MPC · JPL
704493	2008 OU_{8}	—	July 29, 2008	Dauban	F. Kugel, C. Rinner	EOS	1.7 km	MPC · JPL
704494	2008 OP_{13}	—	July 1, 2008	Kitt Peak	Spacewatch	·	1.5 km	MPC · JPL
704495	2008 OV_{14}	—	September 28, 2003	Kitt Peak	Spacewatch	·	2.3 km	MPC · JPL
704496	2008 OD_{15}	—	July 29, 2008	Mount Lemmon	Mount Lemmon Survey	·	940 m	MPC · JPL
704497	2008 OD_{19}	—	July 30, 2008	Mount Lemmon	Mount Lemmon Survey	·	2.0 km	MPC · JPL
704498	2008 OE_{26}	—	August 14, 2012	Haleakala	Pan-STARRS 1	NYS	1.0 km	MPC · JPL
704499	2008 OT_{26}	—	July 30, 2008	Siding Spring	SSS	H	600 m	MPC · JPL
704500	2008 OQ_{27}	—	August 29, 2014	Haleakala	Pan-STARRS 1	·	2.4 km	MPC · JPL

== 704501–704600 ==
back to top

Designation			Discovery			Properties		Ref
Permanent	Provisional	Named after	Date	Site	Discoverer(s)	Category	Diam.	Ref
704501	2008 OE_{28}	—	July 30, 2008	Mount Lemmon	Mount Lemmon Survey	·	570 m	MPC · JPL
704502	2008 OO_{28}	—	December 14, 2015	Haleakala	Pan-STARRS 1	·	2.1 km	MPC · JPL
704503	2008 OJ_{29}	—	November 10, 2004	Kitt Peak	Spacewatch	EOS	1.7 km	MPC · JPL
704504	2008 OP_{29}	—	December 14, 2010	Mount Lemmon	Mount Lemmon Survey	·	2.1 km	MPC · JPL
704505	2008 OV_{29}	—	August 19, 2014	Haleakala	Pan-STARRS 1	·	2.8 km	MPC · JPL
704506	2008 OU_{31}	—	July 30, 2008	Mount Lemmon	Mount Lemmon Survey	·	660 m	MPC · JPL
704507	2008 OH_{32}	—	July 29, 2008	Mount Lemmon	Mount Lemmon Survey	·	1.6 km	MPC · JPL
704508	2008 OJ_{33}	—	July 29, 2008	Kitt Peak	Spacewatch	EUN	760 m	MPC · JPL
704509	2008 PZ	—	June 1, 2008	Mount Lemmon	Mount Lemmon Survey	·	960 m	MPC · JPL
704510	2008 PS_{8}	—	October 7, 2005	Kitt Peak	Spacewatch	·	520 m	MPC · JPL
704511	2008 PH_{13}	—	September 18, 2003	Kitt Peak	Spacewatch	·	2.2 km	MPC · JPL
704512	2008 PP_{13}	—	August 10, 2008	Dauban	F. Kugel, C. Rinner	·	1.4 km	MPC · JPL
704513	2008 PA_{15}	—	August 10, 2008	La Sagra	OAM	·	1.8 km	MPC · JPL
704514	2008 QD_{3}	—	August 24, 2008	Reillanne	Jacquinot, H.	·	3.6 km	MPC · JPL
704515	2008 QM_{8}	—	August 25, 2008	La Sagra	OAM	·	2.6 km	MPC · JPL
704516	2008 QY_{16}	—	August 26, 2008	La Sagra	OAM	·	2.3 km	MPC · JPL
704517	2008 QX_{17}	—	August 27, 2008	Vicques	M. Ory	·	2.5 km	MPC · JPL
704518	2008 QC_{19}	—	August 29, 2008	Pla D'Arguines	R. Ferrando, Ferrando, M.	(5)	780 m	MPC · JPL
704519	2008 QZ_{23}	—	August 21, 2008	Kitt Peak	Spacewatch	·	1.2 km	MPC · JPL
704520	2008 QD_{36}	—	August 21, 2008	Kitt Peak	Spacewatch	·	1.0 km	MPC · JPL
704521	2008 QV_{39}	—	August 24, 2008	La Sagra	OAM	·	2.5 km	MPC · JPL
704522	2008 QY_{48}	—	August 23, 2008	Siding Spring	SSS	·	1.3 km	MPC · JPL
704523	2008 QQ_{49}	—	March 16, 2012	Mount Lemmon	Mount Lemmon Survey	·	2.0 km	MPC · JPL
704524	2008 QP_{50}	—	September 28, 2003	Apache Point	SDSS Collaboration	EOS	1.3 km	MPC · JPL
704525	2008 QM_{51}	—	August 31, 2008	La Sagra	OAM	·	960 m	MPC · JPL
704526	2008 RD_{7}	—	August 20, 2008	Kitt Peak	Spacewatch	·	2.1 km	MPC · JPL
704527	2008 RF_{7}	—	September 3, 2008	Kitt Peak	Spacewatch	TIR	2.3 km	MPC · JPL
704528	2008 RL_{12}	—	September 3, 2008	Kitt Peak	Spacewatch	·	890 m	MPC · JPL
704529	2008 RM_{15}	—	January 31, 2006	Kitt Peak	Spacewatch	MAR	820 m	MPC · JPL
704530	2008 RQ_{15}	—	September 4, 2008	Kitt Peak	Spacewatch	·	1.7 km	MPC · JPL
704531	2008 RB_{17}	—	September 4, 2008	Kitt Peak	Spacewatch	L4	6.0 km	MPC · JPL
704532	2008 RB_{18}	—	April 25, 2006	Kitt Peak	Spacewatch	·	2.3 km	MPC · JPL
704533	2008 RO_{18}	—	September 4, 2008	Kitt Peak	Spacewatch	·	2.4 km	MPC · JPL
704534	2008 RT_{18}	—	August 24, 2008	Kitt Peak	Spacewatch	·	930 m	MPC · JPL
704535	2008 RX_{19}	—	September 20, 2003	Kitt Peak	Spacewatch	·	2.4 km	MPC · JPL
704536	2008 RP_{27}	—	September 8, 2008	Dauban	F. Kugel, C. Rinner	·	2.5 km	MPC · JPL
704537	2008 RB_{30}	—	September 2, 2008	Kitt Peak	Spacewatch	EOS	1.7 km	MPC · JPL
704538	2008 RF_{30}	—	September 2, 2008	Kitt Peak	Spacewatch	·	1.3 km	MPC · JPL
704539	2008 RK_{30}	—	August 22, 2008	Kitt Peak	Spacewatch	·	2.1 km	MPC · JPL
704540	2008 RZ_{31}	—	September 2, 2008	Kitt Peak	Spacewatch	·	3.0 km	MPC · JPL
704541	2008 RB_{33}	—	September 2, 2008	Kitt Peak	Spacewatch	·	1.4 km	MPC · JPL
704542	2008 RH_{34}	—	September 2, 2008	Kitt Peak	Spacewatch	NYS	1.0 km	MPC · JPL
704543	2008 RM_{34}	—	September 2, 2008	Kitt Peak	Spacewatch	·	820 m	MPC · JPL
704544	2008 RZ_{36}	—	September 2, 2008	Kitt Peak	Spacewatch	·	2.2 km	MPC · JPL
704545	2008 RO_{38}	—	September 2, 2008	Kitt Peak	Spacewatch	·	740 m	MPC · JPL
704546	2008 RE_{39}	—	September 2, 2008	Kitt Peak	Spacewatch	·	2.4 km	MPC · JPL
704547	2008 RL_{40}	—	March 20, 2007	Kitt Peak	Spacewatch	·	850 m	MPC · JPL
704548	2008 RN_{43}	—	September 2, 2008	Kitt Peak	Spacewatch	THM	1.9 km	MPC · JPL
704549	2008 RH_{46}	—	September 2, 2008	Kitt Peak	Spacewatch	EOS	1.8 km	MPC · JPL
704550	2008 RR_{52}	—	September 3, 2008	Kitt Peak	Spacewatch	·	1.2 km	MPC · JPL
704551	2008 RY_{52}	—	September 3, 2008	Kitt Peak	Spacewatch	·	1.3 km	MPC · JPL
704552	2008 RJ_{53}	—	July 29, 2008	Mount Lemmon	Mount Lemmon Survey	EOS	1.8 km	MPC · JPL
704553	2008 RB_{56}	—	September 3, 2008	Kitt Peak	Spacewatch	·	2.4 km	MPC · JPL
704554	2008 RZ_{56}	—	February 25, 2006	Kitt Peak	Spacewatch	·	1.8 km	MPC · JPL
704555	2008 RP_{59}	—	September 4, 2008	Kitt Peak	Spacewatch	·	850 m	MPC · JPL
704556	2008 RC_{61}	—	July 29, 2008	Mount Lemmon	Mount Lemmon Survey	·	3.1 km	MPC · JPL
704557	2008 RW_{68}	—	September 4, 2008	Kitt Peak	Spacewatch	L4	6.2 km	MPC · JPL
704558	2008 RN_{69}	—	December 10, 2005	Kitt Peak	Spacewatch	·	1.1 km	MPC · JPL
704559	2008 RS_{69}	—	September 5, 2008	Kitt Peak	Spacewatch	·	900 m	MPC · JPL
704560	2008 RW_{69}	—	September 5, 2008	Kitt Peak	Spacewatch	·	2.2 km	MPC · JPL
704561	2008 RL_{70}	—	September 5, 2008	Kitt Peak	Spacewatch	EOS	1.5 km	MPC · JPL
704562	2008 RO_{70}	—	September 6, 2008	Mount Lemmon	Mount Lemmon Survey	·	1.6 km	MPC · JPL
704563	2008 RN_{75}	—	November 15, 2003	Kitt Peak	Spacewatch	THM	2.2 km	MPC · JPL
704564	2008 RB_{76}	—	September 6, 2008	Mount Lemmon	Mount Lemmon Survey	·	2.6 km	MPC · JPL
704565	2008 RT_{77}	—	September 7, 2008	Mount Lemmon	Mount Lemmon Survey	·	890 m	MPC · JPL
704566	2008 RR_{78}	—	September 8, 2008	Bergisch Gladbach	W. Bickel	EOS	1.7 km	MPC · JPL
704567	2008 RU_{78}	—	September 8, 2008	Bergisch Gladbach	W. Bickel	·	2.2 km	MPC · JPL
704568	2008 RQ_{83}	—	September 4, 2008	Kitt Peak	Spacewatch	·	1.9 km	MPC · JPL
704569	2008 RR_{83}	—	September 4, 2008	Kitt Peak	Spacewatch	·	1.3 km	MPC · JPL
704570	2008 RQ_{84}	—	September 4, 2008	Kitt Peak	Spacewatch	HOF	2.3 km	MPC · JPL
704571	2008 RM_{87}	—	September 5, 2008	Kitt Peak	Spacewatch	·	2.7 km	MPC · JPL
704572	2008 RB_{89}	—	September 5, 2008	Kitt Peak	Spacewatch	·	1.0 km	MPC · JPL
704573	2008 RZ_{89}	—	April 8, 2006	Kitt Peak	Spacewatch	·	3.0 km	MPC · JPL
704574	2008 RD_{91}	—	September 6, 2008	Mount Lemmon	Mount Lemmon Survey	·	1.5 km	MPC · JPL
704575	2008 RV_{93}	—	September 6, 2008	Kitt Peak	Spacewatch	·	1.9 km	MPC · JPL
704576	2008 RS_{95}	—	March 11, 2007	Kitt Peak	Spacewatch	·	2.5 km	MPC · JPL
704577	2008 RA_{97}	—	September 7, 2008	Mount Lemmon	Mount Lemmon Survey	·	540 m	MPC · JPL
704578	2008 RP_{99}	—	September 2, 2008	Kitt Peak	Spacewatch	·	1.0 km	MPC · JPL
704579	2008 RB_{101}	—	September 6, 2008	Kitt Peak	Spacewatch	·	2.9 km	MPC · JPL
704580	2008 RG_{102}	—	September 3, 2008	Kitt Peak	Spacewatch	ELF	3.4 km	MPC · JPL
704581	2008 RS_{103}	—	September 5, 2008	Kitt Peak	Spacewatch	·	2.9 km	MPC · JPL
704582	2008 RR_{104}	—	September 6, 2008	Catalina	CSS	V	670 m	MPC · JPL
704583	2008 RV_{118}	—	September 10, 2008	Kitt Peak	Spacewatch	·	830 m	MPC · JPL
704584	2008 RZ_{124}	—	July 30, 2008	Kitt Peak	Spacewatch	·	2.3 km	MPC · JPL
704585	2008 RL_{125}	—	September 7, 2008	Mount Lemmon	Mount Lemmon Survey	·	2.6 km	MPC · JPL
704586	2008 RF_{127}	—	September 6, 2008	Kitt Peak	Spacewatch	·	2.4 km	MPC · JPL
704587	2008 RZ_{140}	—	September 10, 2008	Kitt Peak	Spacewatch	TIR	2.5 km	MPC · JPL
704588	2008 RQ_{148}	—	September 5, 2008	Kitt Peak	Spacewatch	·	1.3 km	MPC · JPL
704589	2008 RA_{149}	—	September 7, 2008	Mount Lemmon	Mount Lemmon Survey	·	2.4 km	MPC · JPL
704590	2008 RJ_{149}	—	September 9, 2008	Mount Lemmon	Mount Lemmon Survey	·	1.7 km	MPC · JPL
704591	2008 RE_{150}	—	September 4, 2008	Kitt Peak	Spacewatch	·	570 m	MPC · JPL
704592	2008 RN_{150}	—	July 8, 2003	Palomar	NEAT	·	1.7 km	MPC · JPL
704593	2008 RO_{150}	—	September 7, 2008	Mount Lemmon	Mount Lemmon Survey	·	2.2 km	MPC · JPL
704594	2008 RY_{150}	—	September 9, 2008	Mount Lemmon	Mount Lemmon Survey	·	2.4 km	MPC · JPL
704595	2008 RP_{151}	—	September 7, 2008	Mount Lemmon	Mount Lemmon Survey	·	2.7 km	MPC · JPL
704596	2008 RZ_{151}	—	July 30, 2008	Kitt Peak	Spacewatch	MAR	860 m	MPC · JPL
704597	2008 RC_{157}	—	January 6, 2013	Kitt Peak	Spacewatch	·	600 m	MPC · JPL
704598	2008 RE_{157}	—	September 7, 2008	Mount Lemmon	Mount Lemmon Survey	·	2.4 km	MPC · JPL
704599	2008 RN_{157}	—	June 18, 2013	Haleakala	Pan-STARRS 1	·	2.9 km	MPC · JPL
704600	2008 RE_{158}	—	May 10, 2015	Mount Lemmon	Mount Lemmon Survey	ADE	1.5 km	MPC · JPL

== 704601–704700 ==
back to top

Designation			Discovery			Properties		Ref
Permanent	Provisional	Named after	Date	Site	Discoverer(s)	Category	Diam.	Ref
704601	2008 RR_{158}	—	September 4, 2008	Kitt Peak	Spacewatch	·	2.1 km	MPC · JPL
704602	2008 RA_{159}	—	November 8, 2013	Kitt Peak	Spacewatch	·	1.3 km	MPC · JPL
704603	2008 RG_{161}	—	September 7, 2008	Mount Lemmon	Mount Lemmon Survey	·	2.4 km	MPC · JPL
704604	2008 RH_{161}	—	September 7, 2008	Mount Lemmon	Mount Lemmon Survey	·	1.2 km	MPC · JPL
704605	2008 RL_{161}	—	September 6, 2008	Kitt Peak	Spacewatch	·	1.7 km	MPC · JPL
704606	2008 RW_{161}	—	September 3, 2008	Kitt Peak	Spacewatch	(5)	1.1 km	MPC · JPL
704607	2008 RX_{161}	—	September 9, 2008	Mount Lemmon	Mount Lemmon Survey	·	2.2 km	MPC · JPL
704608	2008 RY_{161}	—	February 3, 2017	Haleakala	Pan-STARRS 1	·	2.1 km	MPC · JPL
704609	2008 RL_{162}	—	September 2, 2008	Kitt Peak	Spacewatch	THM	1.9 km	MPC · JPL
704610	2008 RZ_{165}	—	March 18, 2017	Mount Lemmon	Mount Lemmon Survey	·	1.9 km	MPC · JPL
704611	2008 RB_{166}	—	July 26, 2017	Haleakala	Pan-STARRS 1	·	1.2 km	MPC · JPL
704612	2008 RS_{166}	—	November 24, 2009	Mount Lemmon	Mount Lemmon Survey	·	2.2 km	MPC · JPL
704613	2008 RK_{167}	—	September 9, 2008	Mount Lemmon	Mount Lemmon Survey	·	2.0 km	MPC · JPL
704614	2008 RV_{167}	—	September 4, 2008	Kitt Peak	Spacewatch	VER	2.2 km	MPC · JPL
704615	2008 RZ_{168}	—	September 3, 2008	Kitt Peak	Spacewatch	EOS	1.5 km	MPC · JPL
704616	2008 RC_{169}	—	September 4, 2008	Kitt Peak	Spacewatch	EOS	1.6 km	MPC · JPL
704617	2008 RR_{169}	—	September 7, 2008	Mount Lemmon	Mount Lemmon Survey	·	1.9 km	MPC · JPL
704618	2008 RY_{171}	—	September 5, 2008	Kitt Peak	Spacewatch	·	920 m	MPC · JPL
704619	2008 RL_{172}	—	September 6, 2008	Mount Lemmon	Mount Lemmon Survey	·	800 m	MPC · JPL
704620	2008 RN_{173}	—	September 3, 2008	Kitt Peak	Spacewatch	EUN	860 m	MPC · JPL
704621	2008 RS_{173}	—	September 6, 2008	Mount Lemmon	Mount Lemmon Survey	·	1.4 km	MPC · JPL
704622	2008 RO_{175}	—	September 4, 2008	Kitt Peak	Spacewatch	L4	5.4 km	MPC · JPL
704623	2008 RU_{175}	—	September 9, 2008	Mount Lemmon	Mount Lemmon Survey	·	1.4 km	MPC · JPL
704624	2008 RN_{176}	—	September 4, 2008	Kitt Peak	Spacewatch	·	1.2 km	MPC · JPL
704625	2008 RH_{178}	—	September 6, 2008	Kitt Peak	Spacewatch	WIT	720 m	MPC · JPL
704626	2008 RH_{180}	—	September 3, 2008	Kitt Peak	Spacewatch	·	560 m	MPC · JPL
704627	2008 RM_{180}	—	September 6, 2008	Mount Lemmon	Mount Lemmon Survey	L4	6.6 km	MPC · JPL
704628	2008 RU_{184}	—	September 5, 2008	Kitt Peak	Spacewatch	·	2.3 km	MPC · JPL
704629	2008 RU_{185}	—	September 3, 2008	Kitt Peak	Spacewatch	·	1.4 km	MPC · JPL
704630	2008 SJ_{7}	—	September 3, 2008	Kitt Peak	Spacewatch	·	2.7 km	MPC · JPL
704631	2008 SV_{10}	—	March 5, 2006	Kitt Peak	Spacewatch	·	1.4 km	MPC · JPL
704632	2008 SM_{14}	—	September 19, 2008	Kitt Peak	Spacewatch	·	1.4 km	MPC · JPL
704633	2008 SH_{15}	—	September 7, 2008	Mount Lemmon	Mount Lemmon Survey	·	1.7 km	MPC · JPL
704634	2008 SX_{20}	—	September 9, 2008	Mount Lemmon	Mount Lemmon Survey	THM	1.9 km	MPC · JPL
704635	2008 SH_{22}	—	September 4, 2008	Kitt Peak	Spacewatch	·	1.2 km	MPC · JPL
704636	2008 SV_{25}	—	March 2, 2006	Kitt Peak	Spacewatch	RAF	700 m	MPC · JPL
704637	2008 SY_{32}	—	July 30, 2008	Kitt Peak	Spacewatch	EMA	2.7 km	MPC · JPL
704638	2008 SZ_{34}	—	September 20, 2008	Kitt Peak	Spacewatch	·	460 m	MPC · JPL
704639	2008 SC_{38}	—	September 6, 2008	Mount Lemmon	Mount Lemmon Survey	·	1.0 km	MPC · JPL
704640	2008 SU_{43}	—	January 30, 2006	Kitt Peak	Spacewatch	·	740 m	MPC · JPL
704641	2008 SQ_{69}	—	September 9, 2008	Mount Lemmon	Mount Lemmon Survey	·	2.0 km	MPC · JPL
704642	2008 SO_{70}	—	September 22, 2008	Mount Lemmon	Mount Lemmon Survey	EOS	1.6 km	MPC · JPL
704643	2008 SQ_{70}	—	September 6, 2008	Mount Lemmon	Mount Lemmon Survey	MAR	1.0 km	MPC · JPL
704644	2008 SE_{73}	—	September 22, 2008	Kitt Peak	Spacewatch	·	550 m	MPC · JPL
704645	2008 SL_{75}	—	September 23, 2008	Mount Lemmon	Mount Lemmon Survey	·	1.5 km	MPC · JPL
704646	2008 SG_{77}	—	November 7, 2005	Mauna Kea	A. Boattini	·	2.1 km	MPC · JPL
704647	2008 ST_{78}	—	September 23, 2008	Mount Lemmon	Mount Lemmon Survey	URS	3.0 km	MPC · JPL
704648	2008 SB_{80}	—	September 23, 2008	Mount Lemmon	Mount Lemmon Survey	·	2.4 km	MPC · JPL
704649	2008 SS_{81}	—	September 23, 2008	Catalina	CSS	·	1.1 km	MPC · JPL
704650	2008 SA_{85}	—	September 27, 2008	Mount Lemmon	Mount Lemmon Survey	T_{j} (2.9)	3.9 km	MPC · JPL
704651	2008 ST_{85}	—	September 19, 2008	Kitt Peak	Spacewatch	EOS	1.5 km	MPC · JPL
704652	2008 SZ_{86}	—	September 20, 2008	Kitt Peak	Spacewatch	·	2.3 km	MPC · JPL
704653	2008 ST_{88}	—	September 2, 2008	Andrushivka	Ostafijchuk, P., Y. Ivaščenko	·	690 m	MPC · JPL
704654	2008 SR_{109}	—	July 8, 2003	Kitt Peak	Spacewatch	·	1.6 km	MPC · JPL
704655	2008 SP_{113}	—	September 22, 2008	Mount Lemmon	Mount Lemmon Survey	·	930 m	MPC · JPL
704656	2008 SE_{114}	—	September 22, 2008	Kitt Peak	Spacewatch	(5)	1.1 km	MPC · JPL
704657	2008 SG_{115}	—	September 22, 2008	Kitt Peak	Spacewatch	·	2.4 km	MPC · JPL
704658	2008 SP_{115}	—	September 22, 2008	Kitt Peak	Spacewatch	·	2.4 km	MPC · JPL
704659	2008 SU_{118}	—	September 22, 2008	Mount Lemmon	Mount Lemmon Survey	·	2.3 km	MPC · JPL
704660	2008 SD_{120}	—	September 22, 2008	Mount Lemmon	Mount Lemmon Survey	·	2.8 km	MPC · JPL
704661	2008 SC_{126}	—	September 22, 2008	Mount Lemmon	Mount Lemmon Survey	·	2.7 km	MPC · JPL
704662	2008 SV_{128}	—	September 22, 2008	Kitt Peak	Spacewatch	·	600 m	MPC · JPL
704663	2008 SQ_{136}	—	September 23, 2008	Kitt Peak	Spacewatch	·	2.5 km	MPC · JPL
704664	2008 SK_{150}	—	February 1, 2006	Kitt Peak	Spacewatch	·	2.8 km	MPC · JPL
704665	2008 SC_{155}	—	September 24, 2008	Mount Lemmon	Mount Lemmon Survey	·	870 m	MPC · JPL
704666	2008 SS_{156}	—	September 23, 2008	Mount Lemmon	Mount Lemmon Survey	·	2.1 km	MPC · JPL
704667	2008 SO_{170}	—	August 24, 2008	Kitt Peak	Spacewatch	·	1.5 km	MPC · JPL
704668	2008 SV_{171}	—	September 5, 2008	Kitt Peak	Spacewatch	·	2.5 km	MPC · JPL
704669	2008 SX_{177}	—	September 23, 2008	Mount Lemmon	Mount Lemmon Survey	·	1.9 km	MPC · JPL
704670	2008 SX_{179}	—	September 24, 2008	Kitt Peak	Spacewatch	·	850 m	MPC · JPL
704671	2008 SM_{183}	—	September 24, 2008	Kitt Peak	Spacewatch	·	1.2 km	MPC · JPL
704672	2008 SV_{183}	—	September 24, 2008	Kitt Peak	Spacewatch	·	2.1 km	MPC · JPL
704673	2008 SS_{185}	—	September 25, 2008	Bergisch Gladbach	W. Bickel	·	1.1 km	MPC · JPL
704674	2008 SG_{186}	—	September 7, 2008	Mount Lemmon	Mount Lemmon Survey	EOS	1.7 km	MPC · JPL
704675	2008 SV_{186}	—	September 25, 2008	Kitt Peak	Spacewatch	V	500 m	MPC · JPL
704676	2008 SD_{190}	—	September 25, 2008	Kitt Peak	Spacewatch	·	2.4 km	MPC · JPL
704677	2008 SG_{190}	—	September 25, 2008	Kitt Peak	Spacewatch	·	800 m	MPC · JPL
704678	2008 SV_{191}	—	September 4, 2002	Palomar	NEAT	·	2.6 km	MPC · JPL
704679	2008 SN_{195}	—	September 25, 2008	Kitt Peak	Spacewatch	·	2.0 km	MPC · JPL
704680	2008 SU_{198}	—	September 26, 2008	Mount Lemmon	Mount Lemmon Survey	·	930 m	MPC · JPL
704681	2008 SU_{200}	—	September 26, 2008	Kitt Peak	Spacewatch	·	2.6 km	MPC · JPL
704682	2008 SE_{203}	—	September 26, 2008	Kitt Peak	Spacewatch	EOS	1.5 km	MPC · JPL
704683	2008 SV_{204}	—	September 26, 2008	Kitt Peak	Spacewatch	·	1.6 km	MPC · JPL
704684	2008 SL_{207}	—	September 27, 2008	Mount Lemmon	Mount Lemmon Survey	·	2.1 km	MPC · JPL
704685	2008 SU_{214}	—	September 29, 2008	Mount Lemmon	Mount Lemmon Survey	THM	1.8 km	MPC · JPL
704686	2008 SV_{214}	—	September 6, 2008	Kitt Peak	Spacewatch	MRX	710 m	MPC · JPL
704687	2008 SW_{216}	—	September 29, 2008	Mount Lemmon	Mount Lemmon Survey	·	2.2 km	MPC · JPL
704688	2008 SM_{217}	—	September 29, 2008	Mount Lemmon	Mount Lemmon Survey	·	2.2 km	MPC · JPL
704689	2008 SB_{223}	—	September 25, 2008	Mount Lemmon	Mount Lemmon Survey	·	2.8 km	MPC · JPL
704690	2008 SN_{224}	—	September 26, 2008	Kitt Peak	Spacewatch	·	2.4 km	MPC · JPL
704691	2008 SO_{227}	—	September 28, 2008	Mount Lemmon	Mount Lemmon Survey	EOS	1.5 km	MPC · JPL
704692	2008 SB_{229}	—	September 5, 2008	Kitt Peak	Spacewatch	·	460 m	MPC · JPL
704693	2008 SU_{229}	—	September 28, 2008	Mount Lemmon	Mount Lemmon Survey	·	2.4 km	MPC · JPL
704694	2008 SN_{232}	—	September 28, 2008	Mount Lemmon	Mount Lemmon Survey	·	2.3 km	MPC · JPL
704695	2008 SG_{239}	—	September 29, 2008	Mount Lemmon	Mount Lemmon Survey	·	2.3 km	MPC · JPL
704696	2008 SB_{243}	—	September 29, 2008	Kitt Peak	Spacewatch	·	2.3 km	MPC · JPL
704697	2008 SD_{247}	—	February 21, 2017	Haleakala	Pan-STARRS 1	·	2.6 km	MPC · JPL
704698	2008 SV_{261}	—	September 24, 2008	Kitt Peak	Spacewatch	·	2.7 km	MPC · JPL
704699	2008 SR_{263}	—	September 24, 2008	Catalina	CSS	·	2.6 km	MPC · JPL
704700	2008 SS_{264}	—	September 25, 2008	Kitt Peak	Spacewatch	·	2.7 km	MPC · JPL

== 704701–704800 ==
back to top

Designation			Discovery			Properties		Ref
Permanent	Provisional	Named after	Date	Site	Discoverer(s)	Category	Diam.	Ref
704701	2008 SB_{270}	—	September 23, 2008	Kitt Peak	Spacewatch	·	2.9 km	MPC · JPL
704702	2008 SH_{275}	—	September 23, 2008	Kitt Peak	Spacewatch	·	3.3 km	MPC · JPL
704703	2008 SF_{278}	—	September 29, 2008	Catalina	CSS	EOS	1.7 km	MPC · JPL
704704	2008 SE_{293}	—	September 24, 2008	Mount Lemmon	Mount Lemmon Survey	·	2.8 km	MPC · JPL
704705	2008 SK_{296}	—	December 25, 2005	Kitt Peak	Spacewatch	·	590 m	MPC · JPL
704706	2008 SD_{301}	—	September 23, 2008	Catalina	CSS	·	2.3 km	MPC · JPL
704707	2008 SS_{304}	—	September 24, 2008	Kitt Peak	Spacewatch	·	3.0 km	MPC · JPL
704708	2008 SR_{305}	—	September 27, 2008	Mount Lemmon	Mount Lemmon Survey	·	3.2 km	MPC · JPL
704709	2008 SM_{306}	—	September 28, 2008	Mount Lemmon	Mount Lemmon Survey	TIR	2.8 km	MPC · JPL
704710	2008 SR_{307}	—	September 29, 2008	Mount Lemmon	Mount Lemmon Survey	·	2.7 km	MPC · JPL
704711	2008 ST_{313}	—	May 6, 2006	Mount Lemmon	Mount Lemmon Survey	·	2.3 km	MPC · JPL
704712	2008 SX_{313}	—	September 28, 2008	Mount Lemmon	Mount Lemmon Survey	ARM	3.0 km	MPC · JPL
704713	2008 SJ_{314}	—	September 23, 2008	Kitt Peak	Spacewatch	·	3.2 km	MPC · JPL
704714	2008 SM_{314}	—	September 25, 2008	Kitt Peak	Spacewatch	HYG	2.4 km	MPC · JPL
704715	2008 SX_{314}	—	September 24, 2008	Mount Lemmon	Mount Lemmon Survey	·	910 m	MPC · JPL
704716	2008 SN_{315}	—	September 4, 2008	Kitt Peak	Spacewatch	·	1.2 km	MPC · JPL
704717	2008 SS_{315}	—	February 29, 2012	Mount Lemmon	Mount Lemmon Survey	·	3.7 km	MPC · JPL
704718	2008 SX_{316}	—	March 17, 2010	Kitt Peak	Spacewatch	H	480 m	MPC · JPL
704719	2008 SX_{317}	—	July 14, 2013	Haleakala	Pan-STARRS 1	·	2.1 km	MPC · JPL
704720	2008 SK_{318}	—	March 30, 2012	Kitt Peak	Spacewatch	·	2.5 km	MPC · JPL
704721	2008 SN_{318}	—	November 9, 2009	Mount Lemmon	Mount Lemmon Survey	·	3.1 km	MPC · JPL
704722	2008 SQ_{318}	—	September 24, 2008	Kitt Peak	Spacewatch	·	2.6 km	MPC · JPL
704723	2008 SX_{318}	—	January 14, 2011	Kitt Peak	Spacewatch	·	2.8 km	MPC · JPL
704724	2008 SL_{319}	—	September 19, 2014	Haleakala	Pan-STARRS 1	·	2.3 km	MPC · JPL
704725	2008 SO_{319}	—	March 8, 2011	Mount Lemmon	Mount Lemmon Survey	·	2.5 km	MPC · JPL
704726	2008 SO_{320}	—	September 22, 2008	Kitt Peak	Spacewatch	·	920 m	MPC · JPL
704727	2008 SX_{320}	—	September 4, 2013	Mount Lemmon	Mount Lemmon Survey	·	2.7 km	MPC · JPL
704728	2008 SA_{322}	—	May 15, 2012	Haleakala	Pan-STARRS 1	·	2.9 km	MPC · JPL
704729	2008 SR_{323}	—	September 24, 2008	Mount Lemmon	Mount Lemmon Survey	·	2.5 km	MPC · JPL
704730	2008 SA_{324}	—	October 26, 2013	Mount Lemmon	Mount Lemmon Survey	·	3.0 km	MPC · JPL
704731	2008 SG_{324}	—	September 21, 2008	Kitt Peak	Spacewatch	·	2.5 km	MPC · JPL
704732	2008 SL_{324}	—	September 23, 2008	Kitt Peak	Spacewatch	EOS	1.6 km	MPC · JPL
704733	2008 SP_{324}	—	September 23, 2008	Mount Lemmon	Mount Lemmon Survey	·	1.2 km	MPC · JPL
704734	2008 SR_{324}	—	November 26, 2014	Mount Lemmon	Mount Lemmon Survey	·	3.0 km	MPC · JPL
704735	2008 SA_{325}	—	August 2, 2016	Haleakala	Pan-STARRS 1	·	1.4 km	MPC · JPL
704736	2008 SC_{325}	—	September 23, 2008	Mount Lemmon	Mount Lemmon Survey	·	990 m	MPC · JPL
704737	2008 SJ_{325}	—	September 29, 2008	Mount Lemmon	Mount Lemmon Survey	·	2.4 km	MPC · JPL
704738	2008 SQ_{325}	—	October 17, 2014	Mount Lemmon	Mount Lemmon Survey	·	2.4 km	MPC · JPL
704739	2008 SS_{325}	—	September 24, 2008	Kitt Peak	Spacewatch	·	2.4 km	MPC · JPL
704740	2008 SV_{325}	—	August 7, 2008	Kitt Peak	Spacewatch	EOS	1.7 km	MPC · JPL
704741	2008 SX_{325}	—	October 8, 2012	Kitt Peak	Spacewatch	·	950 m	MPC · JPL
704742	2008 SZ_{325}	—	November 16, 2003	Kitt Peak	Spacewatch	·	2.3 km	MPC · JPL
704743	2008 SY_{326}	—	April 15, 2012	Haleakala	Pan-STARRS 1	EOS	1.5 km	MPC · JPL
704744	2008 SZ_{326}	—	September 25, 2008	Kitt Peak	Spacewatch	VER	2.4 km	MPC · JPL
704745	2008 SS_{327}	—	September 23, 2008	Kitt Peak	Spacewatch	HNS	880 m	MPC · JPL
704746	2008 SX_{327}	—	September 29, 2008	Mount Lemmon	Mount Lemmon Survey	·	2.0 km	MPC · JPL
704747	2008 SJ_{329}	—	February 8, 2011	Mount Lemmon	Mount Lemmon Survey	HYG	2.1 km	MPC · JPL
704748	2008 SN_{329}	—	September 23, 2008	Kitt Peak	Spacewatch	·	1.1 km	MPC · JPL
704749	2008 SY_{331}	—	October 12, 2014	Mount Lemmon	Mount Lemmon Survey	TIR	2.2 km	MPC · JPL
704750	2008 SB_{332}	—	September 24, 2008	Mount Lemmon	Mount Lemmon Survey	·	1.1 km	MPC · JPL
704751	2008 SM_{332}	—	January 15, 2018	Haleakala	Pan-STARRS 1	H	510 m	MPC · JPL
704752	2008 ST_{332}	—	February 28, 2012	Haleakala	Pan-STARRS 1	·	2.2 km	MPC · JPL
704753	2008 SY_{332}	—	July 11, 2018	Haleakala	Pan-STARRS 1	·	1.3 km	MPC · JPL
704754	2008 SC_{334}	—	November 28, 2013	Mount Lemmon	Mount Lemmon Survey	AGN	810 m	MPC · JPL
704755	2008 SW_{334}	—	September 22, 2008	Kitt Peak	Spacewatch	·	2.2 km	MPC · JPL
704756	2008 SP_{335}	—	January 10, 2016	Haleakala	Pan-STARRS 1	·	2.0 km	MPC · JPL
704757	2008 SG_{336}	—	September 23, 2008	Mount Lemmon	Mount Lemmon Survey	·	970 m	MPC · JPL
704758	2008 SG_{342}	—	September 24, 2008	Kitt Peak	Spacewatch	·	1.9 km	MPC · JPL
704759	2008 SR_{342}	—	September 25, 2008	Kitt Peak	Spacewatch	·	2.2 km	MPC · JPL
704760	2008 ST_{344}	—	September 23, 2008	Mount Lemmon	Mount Lemmon Survey	·	2.0 km	MPC · JPL
704761	2008 SP_{345}	—	September 5, 2000	Apache Point	SDSS Collaboration	·	830 m	MPC · JPL
704762	2008 SS_{345}	—	September 23, 2008	Kitt Peak	Spacewatch	·	1.0 km	MPC · JPL
704763	2008 SY_{345}	—	September 27, 2008	Mount Lemmon	Mount Lemmon Survey	·	810 m	MPC · JPL
704764	2008 SL_{349}	—	September 29, 2008	Mount Lemmon	Mount Lemmon Survey	·	1.4 km	MPC · JPL
704765	2008 SL_{350}	—	September 26, 2008	Mount Lemmon	Mount Lemmon Survey	ARM	3.3 km	MPC · JPL
704766	2008 SX_{354}	—	September 25, 2008	Kitt Peak	Spacewatch	·	1.8 km	MPC · JPL
704767	2008 SG_{357}	—	September 28, 2008	Catalina	CSS	EUN	1 km	MPC · JPL
704768	2008 SU_{357}	—	September 28, 2008	Mount Lemmon	Mount Lemmon Survey	·	1.1 km	MPC · JPL
704769	2008 SR_{358}	—	September 21, 2008	Mount Lemmon	Mount Lemmon Survey	·	2.3 km	MPC · JPL
704770	2008 SU_{361}	—	September 19, 2008	Kitt Peak	Spacewatch	·	1.1 km	MPC · JPL
704771	2008 SF_{362}	—	September 23, 2008	Kitt Peak	Spacewatch	·	1.3 km	MPC · JPL
704772	2008 TE_{9}	—	October 7, 2008	Tzec Maun	R. Apitzsch	·	2.5 km	MPC · JPL
704773	2008 TQ_{11}	—	September 7, 2008	Mount Lemmon	Mount Lemmon Survey	·	930 m	MPC · JPL
704774	2008 TR_{12}	—	October 1, 2008	Mount Lemmon	Mount Lemmon Survey	·	1.5 km	MPC · JPL
704775	2008 TY_{12}	—	October 1, 2008	Mount Lemmon	Mount Lemmon Survey	·	1.7 km	MPC · JPL
704776	2008 TV_{15}	—	September 5, 2008	Kitt Peak	Spacewatch	·	510 m	MPC · JPL
704777	2008 TK_{23}	—	September 7, 2008	Mount Lemmon	Mount Lemmon Survey	·	1.5 km	MPC · JPL
704778	2008 TK_{28}	—	September 5, 2008	Kitt Peak	Spacewatch	EOS	1.7 km	MPC · JPL
704779	2008 TK_{32}	—	September 20, 2008	Kitt Peak	Spacewatch	·	2.5 km	MPC · JPL
704780	2008 TX_{32}	—	October 1, 2008	Kitt Peak	Spacewatch	·	610 m	MPC · JPL
704781	2008 TR_{35}	—	September 10, 2008	Kitt Peak	Spacewatch	·	2.6 km	MPC · JPL
704782	2008 TY_{37}	—	September 10, 2008	Kitt Peak	Spacewatch	VER	2.4 km	MPC · JPL
704783	2008 TY_{39}	—	October 1, 2008	Mount Lemmon	Mount Lemmon Survey	·	3.0 km	MPC · JPL
704784	2008 TO_{40}	—	October 1, 2008	Mount Lemmon	Mount Lemmon Survey	·	1.1 km	MPC · JPL
704785	2008 TE_{42}	—	October 1, 2008	Mount Lemmon	Mount Lemmon Survey	·	910 m	MPC · JPL
704786	2008 TH_{42}	—	October 1, 2008	Mount Lemmon	Mount Lemmon Survey	·	2.6 km	MPC · JPL
704787	2008 TF_{43}	—	October 1, 2008	Mount Lemmon	Mount Lemmon Survey	VER	2.2 km	MPC · JPL
704788	2008 TO_{43}	—	October 1, 2008	Mount Lemmon	Mount Lemmon Survey	·	2.6 km	MPC · JPL
704789	2008 TW_{46}	—	October 1, 2008	Kitt Peak	Spacewatch	·	1.2 km	MPC · JPL
704790	2008 TN_{48}	—	July 29, 2008	Kitt Peak	Spacewatch	·	2.6 km	MPC · JPL
704791	2008 TT_{51}	—	September 20, 2008	Kitt Peak	Spacewatch	·	1.5 km	MPC · JPL
704792	2008 TC_{56}	—	September 9, 2008	Mount Lemmon	Mount Lemmon Survey	·	2.4 km	MPC · JPL
704793	2008 TD_{58}	—	September 20, 2008	Kitt Peak	Spacewatch	·	2.6 km	MPC · JPL
704794	2008 TY_{59}	—	September 20, 2008	Kitt Peak	Spacewatch	THM	2.3 km	MPC · JPL
704795	2008 TP_{68}	—	September 23, 2008	Kitt Peak	Spacewatch	·	1.2 km	MPC · JPL
704796	2008 TE_{72}	—	October 2, 2008	Kitt Peak	Spacewatch	·	1.6 km	MPC · JPL
704797	2008 TN_{73}	—	October 2, 2008	Kitt Peak	Spacewatch	·	2.7 km	MPC · JPL
704798	2008 TD_{76}	—	October 2, 2008	Mount Lemmon	Mount Lemmon Survey	KOR	950 m	MPC · JPL
704799	2008 TW_{77}	—	September 3, 2008	Kitt Peak	Spacewatch	·	1.5 km	MPC · JPL
704800	2008 TZ_{77}	—	October 2, 2008	Mount Lemmon	Mount Lemmon Survey	·	2.0 km	MPC · JPL

== 704801–704900 ==
back to top

Designation			Discovery			Properties		Ref
Permanent	Provisional	Named after	Date	Site	Discoverer(s)	Category	Diam.	Ref
704801	2008 TU_{78}	—	March 10, 2005	Mount Lemmon	Mount Lemmon Survey	·	2.0 km	MPC · JPL
704802	2008 TG_{82}	—	August 24, 2008	Kitt Peak	Spacewatch	·	2.5 km	MPC · JPL
704803	2008 TC_{86}	—	September 10, 2008	Kitt Peak	Spacewatch	·	2.4 km	MPC · JPL
704804	2008 TJ_{97}	—	September 4, 2008	Kitt Peak	Spacewatch	·	3.2 km	MPC · JPL
704805	2008 TZ_{99}	—	September 24, 2008	Kitt Peak	Spacewatch	·	1.0 km	MPC · JPL
704806	2008 TM_{109}	—	October 6, 2008	Mount Lemmon	Mount Lemmon Survey	·	2.0 km	MPC · JPL
704807	2008 TL_{110}	—	September 23, 2008	Kitt Peak	Spacewatch	·	700 m	MPC · JPL
704808	2008 TR_{112}	—	September 23, 2008	Kitt Peak	Spacewatch	·	3.1 km	MPC · JPL
704809	2008 TG_{113}	—	September 23, 2008	Kitt Peak	Spacewatch	·	2.6 km	MPC · JPL
704810	2008 TX_{115}	—	October 6, 2008	Catalina	CSS	·	3.3 km	MPC · JPL
704811	2008 TM_{124}	—	October 8, 2008	Mount Lemmon	Mount Lemmon Survey	·	2.3 km	MPC · JPL
704812	2008 TC_{127}	—	September 23, 2008	Kitt Peak	Spacewatch	·	1.2 km	MPC · JPL
704813	2008 TR_{133}	—	September 23, 2008	Mount Lemmon	Mount Lemmon Survey	·	1.1 km	MPC · JPL
704814	2008 TV_{134}	—	September 22, 2008	Kitt Peak	Spacewatch	·	2.2 km	MPC · JPL
704815	2008 TE_{137}	—	October 1, 2008	Kitt Peak	Spacewatch	ELF	2.6 km	MPC · JPL
704816	2008 TW_{137}	—	October 8, 2008	Kitt Peak	Spacewatch	·	1.3 km	MPC · JPL
704817	2008 TW_{139}	—	September 23, 2008	Kitt Peak	Spacewatch	·	1.0 km	MPC · JPL
704818	2008 TZ_{144}	—	October 9, 2008	Mount Lemmon	Mount Lemmon Survey	·	970 m	MPC · JPL
704819	2008 TZ_{146}	—	September 20, 2008	Mount Lemmon	Mount Lemmon Survey	·	540 m	MPC · JPL
704820	2008 TW_{154}	—	October 9, 2008	Mount Lemmon	Mount Lemmon Survey	VER	2.2 km	MPC · JPL
704821	2008 TJ_{155}	—	October 9, 2008	Mount Lemmon	Mount Lemmon Survey	·	2.8 km	MPC · JPL
704822	2008 TG_{157}	—	October 4, 2008	Majdanak	Sergeyev, A.	·	2.5 km	MPC · JPL
704823	2008 TM_{158}	—	October 6, 2008	Farra d'Isonzo	Osservatorio Astronomico di Farra d'Isonzo	·	2.1 km	MPC · JPL
704824	2008 TX_{158}	—	August 24, 2008	Kitt Peak	Spacewatch	·	1.0 km	MPC · JPL
704825	2008 TJ_{161}	—	October 2, 2008	Kitt Peak	Spacewatch	·	1.9 km	MPC · JPL
704826	2008 TS_{169}	—	October 7, 2008	Kitt Peak	Spacewatch	·	900 m	MPC · JPL
704827	2008 TQ_{173}	—	October 1, 2008	Mount Lemmon	Mount Lemmon Survey	·	2.4 km	MPC · JPL
704828	2008 TE_{189}	—	October 10, 2008	Kitt Peak	Spacewatch	·	2.6 km	MPC · JPL
704829	2008 TR_{192}	—	October 6, 2008	Mount Lemmon	Mount Lemmon Survey	VER	2.2 km	MPC · JPL
704830	2008 TP_{193}	—	October 10, 2008	Catalina	CSS	EUN	1.3 km	MPC · JPL
704831	2008 TR_{193}	—	October 6, 2008	Mount Lemmon	Mount Lemmon Survey	HNS	900 m	MPC · JPL
704832	2008 TG_{194}	—	May 21, 2015	Haleakala	Pan-STARRS 1	EUN	950 m	MPC · JPL
704833	2008 TT_{194}	—	September 24, 1995	Kitt Peak	Spacewatch	·	1.3 km	MPC · JPL
704834	2008 TF_{195}	—	August 12, 2013	Haleakala	Pan-STARRS 1	·	2.6 km	MPC · JPL
704835	2008 TH_{195}	—	May 21, 2015	Haleakala	Pan-STARRS 1	·	1.3 km	MPC · JPL
704836	2008 TU_{195}	—	October 2, 2008	Mount Lemmon	Mount Lemmon Survey	·	2.2 km	MPC · JPL
704837	2008 TV_{195}	—	October 2, 2008	Kitt Peak	Spacewatch	·	1.1 km	MPC · JPL
704838	2008 TX_{195}	—	October 7, 2008	Mount Lemmon	Mount Lemmon Survey	·	1.2 km	MPC · JPL
704839	2008 TO_{196}	—	October 8, 2008	Kitt Peak	Spacewatch	·	1.5 km	MPC · JPL
704840	2008 TB_{197}	—	October 8, 2008	Kitt Peak	Spacewatch	VER	2.1 km	MPC · JPL
704841	2008 TE_{197}	—	February 25, 2011	Mount Lemmon	Mount Lemmon Survey	·	2.5 km	MPC · JPL
704842	2008 TL_{197}	—	October 10, 2008	Mount Lemmon	Mount Lemmon Survey	·	2.6 km	MPC · JPL
704843	2008 TN_{197}	—	October 10, 2008	Mount Lemmon	Mount Lemmon Survey	URS	3.1 km	MPC · JPL
704844	2008 TE_{198}	—	October 8, 2008	Mount Lemmon	Mount Lemmon Survey	VER	2.5 km	MPC · JPL
704845	2008 TJ_{198}	—	August 9, 2013	Haleakala	Pan-STARRS 1	VER	2.2 km	MPC · JPL
704846	2008 TO_{198}	—	January 20, 2012	Haleakala	Pan-STARRS 1	·	3.9 km	MPC · JPL
704847	2008 TZ_{198}	—	October 1, 2008	Kitt Peak	Spacewatch	·	2.7 km	MPC · JPL
704848	2008 TB_{200}	—	October 8, 2008	Mount Lemmon	Mount Lemmon Survey	HYG	2.1 km	MPC · JPL
704849	2008 TX_{203}	—	October 8, 2008	Mount Lemmon	Mount Lemmon Survey	·	2.7 km	MPC · JPL
704850	2008 TJ_{204}	—	October 2, 2008	Kitt Peak	Spacewatch	H	430 m	MPC · JPL
704851	2008 TL_{205}	—	March 4, 2017	Haleakala	Pan-STARRS 1	·	2.4 km	MPC · JPL
704852	2008 TM_{205}	—	October 1, 2008	Mount Lemmon	Mount Lemmon Survey	EOS	1.6 km	MPC · JPL
704853	2008 TL_{206}	—	October 6, 2008	Mount Lemmon	Mount Lemmon Survey	·	2.4 km	MPC · JPL
704854	2008 TS_{206}	—	October 9, 2008	Mount Lemmon	Mount Lemmon Survey	·	1.9 km	MPC · JPL
704855	2008 TV_{206}	—	October 10, 2008	Mount Lemmon	Mount Lemmon Survey	·	1.3 km	MPC · JPL
704856	2008 TG_{208}	—	October 24, 2014	Mount Lemmon	Mount Lemmon Survey	(31811)	2.2 km	MPC · JPL
704857	2008 TP_{208}	—	September 24, 2012	Kitt Peak	Spacewatch	·	810 m	MPC · JPL
704858	2008 TM_{212}	—	March 24, 2012	Mount Lemmon	Mount Lemmon Survey	·	2.9 km	MPC · JPL
704859	2008 TN_{212}	—	October 10, 2008	Mount Lemmon	Mount Lemmon Survey	·	1.1 km	MPC · JPL
704860	2008 TO_{212}	—	January 4, 2016	Haleakala	Pan-STARRS 1	VER	2.2 km	MPC · JPL
704861	2008 TC_{213}	—	September 28, 2008	Mount Lemmon	Mount Lemmon Survey	·	2.6 km	MPC · JPL
704862	2008 TD_{213}	—	February 26, 2011	Mount Lemmon	Mount Lemmon Survey	·	2.4 km	MPC · JPL
704863	2008 TU_{213}	—	October 7, 2008	Mount Lemmon	Mount Lemmon Survey	KRM	1.4 km	MPC · JPL
704864	2008 TQ_{216}	—	October 6, 2008	Mount Lemmon	Mount Lemmon Survey	·	2.3 km	MPC · JPL
704865	2008 TT_{216}	—	October 9, 2008	Mount Lemmon	Mount Lemmon Survey	EOS	1.6 km	MPC · JPL
704866	2008 TY_{216}	—	October 6, 2008	Mount Lemmon	Mount Lemmon Survey	·	2.1 km	MPC · JPL
704867	2008 TA_{218}	—	October 8, 2008	Mount Lemmon	Mount Lemmon Survey	·	1.3 km	MPC · JPL
704868	2008 TE_{218}	—	October 5, 2008	La Sagra	OAM	·	1.5 km	MPC · JPL
704869	2008 TG_{219}	—	October 8, 2008	Mount Lemmon	Mount Lemmon Survey	·	1.4 km	MPC · JPL
704870	2008 TR_{220}	—	October 2, 2008	Mount Lemmon	Mount Lemmon Survey	·	860 m	MPC · JPL
704871	2008 TG_{222}	—	October 8, 2008	Mount Lemmon	Mount Lemmon Survey	·	560 m	MPC · JPL
704872	2008 TW_{222}	—	October 2, 2008	Mount Lemmon	Mount Lemmon Survey	·	930 m	MPC · JPL
704873	2008 TX_{222}	—	October 10, 2008	Mount Lemmon	Mount Lemmon Survey	·	2.4 km	MPC · JPL
704874	2008 TF_{224}	—	October 10, 2008	Kitt Peak	Spacewatch	·	700 m	MPC · JPL
704875	2008 TM_{224}	—	October 9, 2008	Mount Lemmon	Mount Lemmon Survey	·	2.4 km	MPC · JPL
704876	2008 TF_{225}	—	October 1, 2008	Mount Lemmon	Mount Lemmon Survey	·	2.3 km	MPC · JPL
704877	2008 TZ_{225}	—	October 9, 2008	Mount Lemmon	Mount Lemmon Survey	·	2.5 km	MPC · JPL
704878	2008 TG_{226}	—	October 9, 2008	Mount Lemmon	Mount Lemmon Survey	·	2.5 km	MPC · JPL
704879	2008 TA_{230}	—	October 3, 2008	Mount Lemmon	Mount Lemmon Survey	·	1.3 km	MPC · JPL
704880	2008 TC_{230}	—	October 7, 2008	Mount Lemmon	Mount Lemmon Survey	·	2.4 km	MPC · JPL
704881	2008 TD_{232}	—	October 1, 2008	Kitt Peak	Spacewatch	·	2.3 km	MPC · JPL
704882	2008 TR_{233}	—	October 7, 2008	Mount Lemmon	Mount Lemmon Survey	T_{j} (2.97)	3.2 km	MPC · JPL
704883	2008 TR_{234}	—	October 1, 2008	Mount Lemmon	Mount Lemmon Survey	·	800 m	MPC · JPL
704884	2008 TW_{235}	—	October 1, 2008	Kitt Peak	Spacewatch	·	850 m	MPC · JPL
704885	2008 TL_{237}	—	October 1, 2008	Mount Lemmon	Mount Lemmon Survey	·	1.4 km	MPC · JPL
704886	2008 TU_{239}	—	October 1, 2008	Mount Lemmon	Mount Lemmon Survey	·	1.5 km	MPC · JPL
704887	2008 TV_{240}	—	October 1, 2008	Mount Lemmon	Mount Lemmon Survey	KOR	1 km	MPC · JPL
704888	2008 UD_{2}	—	October 8, 2008	Mount Lemmon	Mount Lemmon Survey	·	2.4 km	MPC · JPL
704889	2008 UY_{5}	—	October 26, 2008	Kitt Peak	Spacewatch	H	550 m	MPC · JPL
704890	2008 UX_{11}	—	September 24, 2008	Kitt Peak	Spacewatch	EOS	1.7 km	MPC · JPL
704891	2008 UV_{12}	—	September 23, 2008	Kitt Peak	Spacewatch	·	2.8 km	MPC · JPL
704892	2008 UW_{13}	—	October 17, 2008	Kitt Peak	Spacewatch	·	1.6 km	MPC · JPL
704893	2008 UH_{17}	—	September 24, 2008	Kitt Peak	Spacewatch	VER	2.1 km	MPC · JPL
704894	2008 UO_{23}	—	September 23, 2008	Mount Lemmon	Mount Lemmon Survey	·	800 m	MPC · JPL
704895	2008 UM_{25}	—	January 9, 2006	Kitt Peak	Spacewatch	NYS	850 m	MPC · JPL
704896	2008 UG_{37}	—	October 20, 2008	Kitt Peak	Spacewatch	HYG	2.3 km	MPC · JPL
704897	2008 US_{42}	—	October 20, 2008	Kitt Peak	Spacewatch	·	2.4 km	MPC · JPL
704898	2008 UN_{47}	—	September 24, 2008	Mount Lemmon	Mount Lemmon Survey	·	1.1 km	MPC · JPL
704899	2008 UE_{48}	—	May 1, 2006	Kitt Peak	Spacewatch	·	2.7 km	MPC · JPL
704900	2008 UK_{49}	—	June 11, 2004	Palomar	NEAT	·	660 m	MPC · JPL

== 704901–705000 ==
back to top

Designation			Discovery			Properties		Ref
Permanent	Provisional	Named after	Date	Site	Discoverer(s)	Category	Diam.	Ref
704901	2008 UD_{54}	—	September 24, 2008	Mount Lemmon	Mount Lemmon Survey	·	2.1 km	MPC · JPL
704902	2008 UB_{56}	—	October 10, 2008	Mount Lemmon	Mount Lemmon Survey	KOR	1.1 km	MPC · JPL
704903	2008 UF_{56}	—	September 2, 2008	Kitt Peak	Spacewatch	·	2.0 km	MPC · JPL
704904	2008 UG_{59}	—	September 23, 2008	Kitt Peak	Spacewatch	·	2.6 km	MPC · JPL
704905	2008 UK_{59}	—	October 21, 2008	Mount Lemmon	Mount Lemmon Survey	·	1.0 km	MPC · JPL
704906	2008 UU_{67}	—	October 21, 2008	Mount Lemmon	Mount Lemmon Survey	·	2.7 km	MPC · JPL
704907	2008 UJ_{70}	—	October 21, 2008	Kitt Peak	Spacewatch	·	3.3 km	MPC · JPL
704908	2008 UN_{77}	—	October 21, 2008	Kitt Peak	Spacewatch	·	3.1 km	MPC · JPL
704909	2008 UF_{79}	—	October 3, 2008	Mount Lemmon	Mount Lemmon Survey	·	1.1 km	MPC · JPL
704910	2008 UM_{80}	—	October 22, 2008	Kitt Peak	Spacewatch	·	2.9 km	MPC · JPL
704911	2008 UG_{81}	—	September 6, 2008	Mount Lemmon	Mount Lemmon Survey	·	1.2 km	MPC · JPL
704912	2008 UG_{103}	—	October 20, 2008	Kitt Peak	Spacewatch	·	2.4 km	MPC · JPL
704913	2008 UM_{105}	—	October 20, 2008	Mount Lemmon	Mount Lemmon Survey	EOS	1.6 km	MPC · JPL
704914	2008 UO_{106}	—	September 4, 2008	Kitt Peak	Spacewatch	·	2.2 km	MPC · JPL
704915	2008 UL_{109}	—	September 20, 2008	Mount Lemmon	Mount Lemmon Survey	·	2.6 km	MPC · JPL
704916	2008 UK_{115}	—	October 22, 2008	Kitt Peak	Spacewatch	·	2.2 km	MPC · JPL
704917	2008 UZ_{118}	—	September 25, 2008	Mount Lemmon	Mount Lemmon Survey	ARM	3.1 km	MPC · JPL
704918	2008 UE_{120}	—	October 22, 2008	Kitt Peak	Spacewatch	·	2.5 km	MPC · JPL
704919	2008 UW_{121}	—	October 22, 2008	Kitt Peak	Spacewatch	·	2.6 km	MPC · JPL
704920	2008 UY_{121}	—	October 22, 2008	Kitt Peak	Spacewatch	·	1.1 km	MPC · JPL
704921	2008 UZ_{123}	—	October 6, 2008	Mount Lemmon	Mount Lemmon Survey	LIX	3.2 km	MPC · JPL
704922	2008 UY_{125}	—	October 22, 2008	Kitt Peak	Spacewatch	·	3.3 km	MPC · JPL
704923	2008 UC_{129}	—	October 9, 2008	Kitt Peak	Spacewatch	·	740 m	MPC · JPL
704924	2008 UQ_{131}	—	September 9, 2008	Mount Lemmon	Mount Lemmon Survey	(5651)	2.7 km	MPC · JPL
704925	2008 UJ_{134}	—	October 23, 2008	Kitt Peak	Spacewatch	·	880 m	MPC · JPL
704926	2008 UM_{137}	—	October 23, 2008	Kitt Peak	Spacewatch	·	1.4 km	MPC · JPL
704927	2008 UQ_{142}	—	October 23, 2008	Kitt Peak	Spacewatch	·	1.0 km	MPC · JPL
704928	2008 UV_{142}	—	October 23, 2008	Kitt Peak	Spacewatch	·	3.1 km	MPC · JPL
704929	2008 UR_{143}	—	December 17, 2003	Kitt Peak	Spacewatch	·	1.8 km	MPC · JPL
704930	2008 UU_{151}	—	October 23, 2008	Mount Lemmon	Mount Lemmon Survey	·	970 m	MPC · JPL
704931	2008 UV_{152}	—	September 23, 2008	Kitt Peak	Spacewatch	THM	2.0 km	MPC · JPL
704932	2008 UJ_{153}	—	October 23, 2008	Mount Lemmon	Mount Lemmon Survey	·	1.5 km	MPC · JPL
704933	2008 UK_{153}	—	October 23, 2008	Mount Lemmon	Mount Lemmon Survey	EOS	1.8 km	MPC · JPL
704934	2008 UO_{153}	—	October 23, 2008	Mount Lemmon	Mount Lemmon Survey	·	2.3 km	MPC · JPL
704935	2008 UU_{154}	—	October 23, 2008	Mount Lemmon	Mount Lemmon Survey	·	1.8 km	MPC · JPL
704936	2008 UZ_{161}	—	May 26, 2006	Mount Lemmon	Mount Lemmon Survey	·	2.9 km	MPC · JPL
704937	2008 UJ_{167}	—	October 24, 2008	Kitt Peak	Spacewatch	·	2.0 km	MPC · JPL
704938	2008 UZ_{174}	—	October 24, 2008	Kitt Peak	Spacewatch	·	1.1 km	MPC · JPL
704939	2008 UU_{176}	—	October 24, 2008	Mount Lemmon	Mount Lemmon Survey	·	2.9 km	MPC · JPL
704940	2008 UW_{179}	—	October 20, 2008	Kitt Peak	Spacewatch	·	2.1 km	MPC · JPL
704941	2008 UR_{183}	—	October 24, 2008	Mount Lemmon	Mount Lemmon Survey	·	2.4 km	MPC · JPL
704942	2008 UD_{184}	—	September 29, 2008	Kitt Peak	Spacewatch	·	690 m	MPC · JPL
704943	2008 UV_{188}	—	October 25, 2008	Kitt Peak	Spacewatch	·	2.5 km	MPC · JPL
704944	2008 UQ_{191}	—	September 23, 2008	Kitt Peak	Spacewatch	·	1.4 km	MPC · JPL
704945	2008 UO_{206}	—	October 22, 2008	Kitt Peak	Spacewatch	·	1.6 km	MPC · JPL
704946	2008 UF_{207}	—	October 23, 2008	Kitt Peak	Spacewatch	·	1.9 km	MPC · JPL
704947	2008 UH_{212}	—	October 10, 2008	Mount Lemmon	Mount Lemmon Survey	·	2.7 km	MPC · JPL
704948	2008 UR_{212}	—	October 24, 2008	Kitt Peak	Spacewatch	·	2.5 km	MPC · JPL
704949	2008 UK_{220}	—	October 25, 2008	Kitt Peak	Spacewatch	·	2.9 km	MPC · JPL
704950	2008 UB_{224}	—	October 25, 2008	Kitt Peak	Spacewatch	VER	2.6 km	MPC · JPL
704951	2008 UK_{224}	—	October 25, 2008	Kitt Peak	Spacewatch	·	1.5 km	MPC · JPL
704952	2008 UW_{225}	—	July 9, 2004	Palomar	NEAT	·	1.3 km	MPC · JPL
704953	2008 UA_{226}	—	October 6, 2008	Catalina	CSS	·	2.4 km	MPC · JPL
704954	2008 UP_{232}	—	October 26, 2008	Kitt Peak	Spacewatch	H	440 m	MPC · JPL
704955	2008 UO_{233}	—	October 26, 2008	Kitt Peak	Spacewatch	VER	3.0 km	MPC · JPL
704956	2008 UY_{233}	—	October 3, 2008	Kitt Peak	Spacewatch	LIX	3.2 km	MPC · JPL
704957	2008 UD_{234}	—	October 26, 2008	Mount Lemmon	Mount Lemmon Survey	WIT	730 m	MPC · JPL
704958	2008 UQ_{234}	—	October 26, 2008	Kitt Peak	Spacewatch	·	880 m	MPC · JPL
704959	2008 UY_{235}	—	October 26, 2008	Mount Lemmon	Mount Lemmon Survey	·	2.2 km	MPC · JPL
704960	2008 UZ_{239}	—	October 26, 2008	Kitt Peak	Spacewatch	·	1.1 km	MPC · JPL
704961	2008 UA_{241}	—	October 26, 2008	Kitt Peak	Spacewatch	·	900 m	MPC · JPL
704962	2008 UK_{241}	—	October 26, 2008	Kitt Peak	Spacewatch	·	2.8 km	MPC · JPL
704963	2008 UE_{242}	—	October 22, 2008	Kitt Peak	Spacewatch	·	2.7 km	MPC · JPL
704964	2008 UB_{243}	—	October 26, 2008	Kitt Peak	Spacewatch	·	3.3 km	MPC · JPL
704965	2008 UV_{245}	—	October 21, 2008	Mount Lemmon	Mount Lemmon Survey	·	2.6 km	MPC · JPL
704966	2008 UV_{246}	—	October 26, 2008	Mount Lemmon	Mount Lemmon Survey	·	1.2 km	MPC · JPL
704967	2008 UZ_{250}	—	September 22, 2008	Mount Lemmon	Mount Lemmon Survey	·	2.8 km	MPC · JPL
704968	2008 UC_{253}	—	October 27, 2008	Mount Lemmon	Mount Lemmon Survey	·	2.1 km	MPC · JPL
704969	2008 UK_{253}	—	October 27, 2008	Kitt Peak	Spacewatch	·	2.4 km	MPC · JPL
704970	2008 UR_{255}	—	October 27, 2008	Kitt Peak	Spacewatch	·	640 m	MPC · JPL
704971	2008 UN_{256}	—	October 27, 2008	Kitt Peak	Spacewatch	EOS	1.6 km	MPC · JPL
704972	2008 UK_{258}	—	October 27, 2008	Kitt Peak	Spacewatch	·	3.2 km	MPC · JPL
704973	2008 UM_{258}	—	October 27, 2008	Kitt Peak	Spacewatch	(883)	550 m	MPC · JPL
704974	2008 UN_{260}	—	September 6, 2008	Mount Lemmon	Mount Lemmon Survey	·	2.3 km	MPC · JPL
704975	2008 UP_{260}	—	October 7, 2008	Mount Lemmon	Mount Lemmon Survey	·	1.0 km	MPC · JPL
704976	2008 UD_{261}	—	September 6, 2008	Mount Lemmon	Mount Lemmon Survey	·	1.1 km	MPC · JPL
704977	2008 UV_{262}	—	October 27, 2008	Mount Lemmon	Mount Lemmon Survey	·	3.1 km	MPC · JPL
704978	2008 UU_{264}	—	October 9, 2008	Kitt Peak	Spacewatch	·	3.4 km	MPC · JPL
704979	2008 UB_{265}	—	October 28, 2008	Kitt Peak	Spacewatch	·	2.5 km	MPC · JPL
704980	2008 UQ_{269}	—	October 28, 2008	Kitt Peak	Spacewatch	·	2.3 km	MPC · JPL
704981	2008 UQ_{272}	—	October 28, 2008	Mount Lemmon	Mount Lemmon Survey	·	2.5 km	MPC · JPL
704982	2008 UR_{273}	—	October 28, 2008	Kitt Peak	Spacewatch	·	570 m	MPC · JPL
704983	2008 UL_{278}	—	October 7, 2008	Kitt Peak	Spacewatch	(1298)	2.1 km	MPC · JPL
704984	2008 UN_{278}	—	January 14, 1994	Kitt Peak	Spacewatch	·	1.5 km	MPC · JPL
704985	2008 UE_{281}	—	October 28, 2008	Mount Lemmon	Mount Lemmon Survey	·	1.0 km	MPC · JPL
704986	2008 UY_{289}	—	October 28, 2008	Kitt Peak	Spacewatch	·	1.1 km	MPC · JPL
704987	2008 UN_{291}	—	September 23, 2008	Mount Lemmon	Mount Lemmon Survey	·	1.2 km	MPC · JPL
704988	2008 UW_{292}	—	September 29, 2008	Mount Lemmon	Mount Lemmon Survey	·	1.4 km	MPC · JPL
704989	2008 UN_{297}	—	October 29, 2008	Kitt Peak	Spacewatch	·	1.0 km	MPC · JPL
704990	2008 UO_{297}	—	October 29, 2008	Kitt Peak	Spacewatch	·	2.8 km	MPC · JPL
704991	2008 UR_{299}	—	October 21, 2008	Kitt Peak	Spacewatch	·	520 m	MPC · JPL
704992	2008 UJ_{300}	—	September 5, 2008	Kitt Peak	Spacewatch	·	2.9 km	MPC · JPL
704993	2008 UL_{301}	—	October 29, 2008	Kitt Peak	Spacewatch	·	3.2 km	MPC · JPL
704994	2008 UK_{303}	—	October 9, 2008	Kitt Peak	Spacewatch	·	2.7 km	MPC · JPL
704995	2008 UZ_{304}	—	October 29, 2008	Mount Lemmon	Mount Lemmon Survey	·	980 m	MPC · JPL
704996	2008 UH_{311}	—	September 30, 2008	Catalina	CSS	·	3.1 km	MPC · JPL
704997	2008 UQ_{311}	—	October 30, 2008	Kitt Peak	Spacewatch	·	2.9 km	MPC · JPL
704998	2008 UF_{312}	—	September 28, 2008	Mount Lemmon	Mount Lemmon Survey	·	2.8 km	MPC · JPL
704999	2008 US_{312}	—	October 21, 2008	Kitt Peak	Spacewatch	·	1.0 km	MPC · JPL
705000	2008 UX_{317}	—	October 10, 2008	Mount Lemmon	Mount Lemmon Survey	·	1.1 km	MPC · JPL

back to top
