= List of minor planets: 610001–611000 =

The following is a partial list of minor planets, running from minor-planet number 610001 through 611000, inclusive. The primary data for this and other partial lists is based on JPL's "Small-Body Orbital Elements" and data available from the Minor Planet Center. Critical list information is also provided by the MPC, unless otherwise specified from Lowell Observatory. A detailed description of the table's columns and additional sources are given on the main page including a complete list of every page in this series, and a statistical break-up on the dynamical classification of minor planets.

Also see the summary list of all named bodies in numerical and alphabetical order, and the corresponding naming citations for the number range of this particular list. New namings may only be added to this list after official publication, as the preannouncement of names is condemned by the Working Group for Small Bodies Nomenclature of the International Astronomical Union.

Near-Earth obj.	MBA (inner)	MBA (outer)	Centaur
Mars-crosser	MBA (middle)	Jupiter trojan	Trans-Neptunian obj.
Unclassified

== 610001–610100 ==
Designation			Discovery			Properties		Ref
Permanent	Provisional	Named after	Date	Site	Discoverer(s)	Category	Diam.	Ref
610001	2005 VB_{140}	—	November 1, 2005	Mount Lemmon	Mount Lemmon Survey	·	1.1 km	MPC · JPL
610002	2005 VU_{141}	—	November 9, 2013	Haleakala	Pan-STARRS 1	3:2 · SHU	3.8 km	MPC · JPL
610003	2005 VE_{142}	—	November 10, 2005	Kitt Peak	Spacewatch	·	1.0 km	MPC · JPL
610004	2005 VO_{147}	—	May 9, 2011	Mount Lemmon	Mount Lemmon Survey	·	1.1 km	MPC · JPL
610005	2005 VP_{147}	—	November 7, 2005	Mauna Kea	A. Boattini	·	2.7 km	MPC · JPL
610006	2005 VY_{147}	—	November 7, 2005	Mauna Kea	A. Boattini	(5)	830 m	MPC · JPL
610007	2005 VA_{148}	—	July 5, 2016	Haleakala	Pan-STARRS 1	V	550 m	MPC · JPL
610008	2005 VB_{148}	—	November 1, 2005	Mount Lemmon	Mount Lemmon Survey	·	2.2 km	MPC · JPL
610009	2005 VG_{148}	—	January 3, 2017	Haleakala	Pan-STARRS 1	·	2.5 km	MPC · JPL
610010	2005 VS_{149}	—	April 13, 2008	Kitt Peak	Spacewatch	·	1.8 km	MPC · JPL
610011	2005 VE_{152}	—	November 6, 2005	Kitt Peak	Spacewatch	·	2.3 km	MPC · JPL
610012	2005 VT_{152}	—	November 7, 2005	Mauna Kea	A. Boattini	·	2.2 km	MPC · JPL
610013	2005 VT_{153}	—	November 1, 2005	Kitt Peak	Spacewatch	·	1.5 km	MPC · JPL
610014	2005 VO_{155}	—	November 3, 2005	Mount Lemmon	Mount Lemmon Survey	·	2.1 km	MPC · JPL
610015	2005 WZ_{22}	—	October 25, 2001	Kitt Peak	Spacewatch	·	1.1 km	MPC · JPL
610016	2005 WZ_{35}	—	November 22, 2005	Kitt Peak	Spacewatch	T_{j} (2.99) · 3:2	4.5 km	MPC · JPL
610017	2005 WG_{36}	—	November 22, 2005	Kitt Peak	Spacewatch	EOS	1.5 km	MPC · JPL
610018	2005 WU_{40}	—	November 25, 2005	Mount Lemmon	Mount Lemmon Survey	·	1.6 km	MPC · JPL
610019	2005 WB_{50}	—	November 25, 2005	Mount Lemmon	Mount Lemmon Survey	·	2.0 km	MPC · JPL
610020	2005 WQ_{52}	—	November 25, 2005	Mount Lemmon	Mount Lemmon Survey	·	1.6 km	MPC · JPL
610021	2005 WK_{58}	—	October 27, 2005	Mount Lemmon	Mount Lemmon Survey	·	3.6 km	MPC · JPL
610022	2005 WP_{61}	—	October 26, 2005	Kitt Peak	Spacewatch	·	1.8 km	MPC · JPL
610023	2005 WK_{69}	—	November 26, 2005	Mount Lemmon	Mount Lemmon Survey	H	480 m	MPC · JPL
610024	2005 WK_{76}	—	November 25, 2005	Kitt Peak	Spacewatch	·	2.1 km	MPC · JPL
610025	2005 WP_{80}	—	November 26, 2005	Mount Lemmon	Mount Lemmon Survey	·	1.8 km	MPC · JPL
610026	2005 WA_{86}	—	October 29, 2005	Mount Lemmon	Mount Lemmon Survey	EOS	1.4 km	MPC · JPL
610027	2005 WA_{87}	—	October 30, 2005	Mount Lemmon	Mount Lemmon Survey	·	2.9 km	MPC · JPL
610028	2005 WD_{92}	—	November 25, 2005	Mount Lemmon	Mount Lemmon Survey	EOS	1.6 km	MPC · JPL
610029	2005 WX_{92}	—	November 25, 2005	Mount Lemmon	Mount Lemmon Survey	·	2.2 km	MPC · JPL
610030	2005 WE_{93}	—	November 25, 2005	Mount Lemmon	Mount Lemmon Survey	·	2.8 km	MPC · JPL
610031	2005 WP_{94}	—	November 26, 2005	Kitt Peak	Spacewatch	EOS	2.0 km	MPC · JPL
610032	2005 WR_{95}	—	November 1, 2005	Mount Lemmon	Mount Lemmon Survey	·	1.7 km	MPC · JPL
610033	2005 WH_{96}	—	November 26, 2005	Kitt Peak	Spacewatch	·	2.0 km	MPC · JPL
610034	2005 WP_{96}	—	November 26, 2005	Kitt Peak	Spacewatch	HYG	2.4 km	MPC · JPL
610035	2005 WP_{101}	—	November 29, 2005	Kitt Peak	Spacewatch	·	2.6 km	MPC · JPL
610036	2005 WN_{102}	—	November 29, 2005	Mount Lemmon	Mount Lemmon Survey	·	2.3 km	MPC · JPL
610037	2005 WX_{105}	—	October 25, 2005	Catalina	CSS	·	1.4 km	MPC · JPL
610038	2005 WE_{112}	—	November 30, 2005	Mount Lemmon	Mount Lemmon Survey	·	1.9 km	MPC · JPL
610039	2005 WE_{126}	—	November 25, 2005	Mount Lemmon	Mount Lemmon Survey	·	1.9 km	MPC · JPL
610040	2005 WW_{128}	—	November 25, 2005	Mount Lemmon	Mount Lemmon Survey	·	1.5 km	MPC · JPL
610041	2005 WN_{129}	—	November 25, 2005	Mount Lemmon	Mount Lemmon Survey	·	1.3 km	MPC · JPL
610042	2005 WP_{129}	—	October 1, 2005	Mount Lemmon	Mount Lemmon Survey	·	1.4 km	MPC · JPL
610043	2005 WX_{129}	—	November 25, 2005	Mount Lemmon	Mount Lemmon Survey	EOS	1.5 km	MPC · JPL
610044	2005 WW_{130}	—	November 25, 2005	Mount Lemmon	Mount Lemmon Survey	·	1.1 km	MPC · JPL
610045	2005 WO_{132}	—	November 25, 2005	Mount Lemmon	Mount Lemmon Survey	EOS	1.3 km	MPC · JPL
610046	2005 WC_{135}	—	November 25, 2005	Mount Lemmon	Mount Lemmon Survey	·	1.8 km	MPC · JPL
610047	2005 WO_{141}	—	November 28, 2005	Mount Lemmon	Mount Lemmon Survey	·	1.9 km	MPC · JPL
610048	2005 WJ_{161}	—	November 28, 2005	Mount Lemmon	Mount Lemmon Survey	·	1.4 km	MPC · JPL
610049	2005 WH_{162}	—	November 10, 2005	Mount Lemmon	Mount Lemmon Survey	EOS	2.0 km	MPC · JPL
610050	2005 WQ_{177}	—	November 30, 2005	Kitt Peak	Spacewatch	EOS	1.6 km	MPC · JPL
610051	2005 WH_{189}	—	November 30, 2005	Kitt Peak	Spacewatch	TEL	1.3 km	MPC · JPL
610052	2005 WP_{189}	—	November 30, 2005	Kitt Peak	Spacewatch	·	1.3 km	MPC · JPL
610053	2005 WK_{192}	—	November 25, 2005	Catalina	CSS	·	940 m	MPC · JPL
610054	2005 WD_{194}	—	November 29, 2005	Catalina	CSS	·	2.4 km	MPC · JPL
610055	2005 WX_{195}	—	November 26, 2005	Mount Lemmon	Mount Lemmon Survey	·	2.2 km	MPC · JPL
610056	2005 WV_{201}	—	November 29, 2005	Kitt Peak	Spacewatch	·	490 m	MPC · JPL
610057	2005 WC_{205}	—	November 25, 2005	Mount Lemmon	Mount Lemmon Survey	·	2.4 km	MPC · JPL
610058	2005 WU_{205}	—	November 30, 2005	Mount Lemmon	Mount Lemmon Survey	·	1.9 km	MPC · JPL
610059	2005 WL_{207}	—	January 28, 2007	Mount Lemmon	Mount Lemmon Survey	·	1.8 km	MPC · JPL
610060	2005 WF_{209}	—	November 29, 2005	Kitt Peak	Spacewatch	3:2 · SHU	3.1 km	MPC · JPL
610061	2005 WT_{210}	—	November 21, 2005	Kitt Peak	Spacewatch	H	510 m	MPC · JPL
610062	2005 WF_{211}	—	April 21, 2004	Kitt Peak	Spacewatch	NYS	1.2 km	MPC · JPL
610063	2005 WR_{211}	—	October 29, 2005	Mount Lemmon	Mount Lemmon Survey	3:2 · SHU	3.8 km	MPC · JPL
610064	2005 WF_{213}	—	November 22, 2005	Kitt Peak	Spacewatch	·	2.4 km	MPC · JPL
610065	2005 WM_{213}	—	November 30, 2005	Kitt Peak	Spacewatch	·	1.8 km	MPC · JPL
610066	2005 WH_{214}	—	November 25, 2005	Mount Lemmon	Mount Lemmon Survey	·	550 m	MPC · JPL
610067	2005 WJ_{214}	—	March 15, 2013	Mount Lemmon	Mount Lemmon Survey	·	2.0 km	MPC · JPL
610068	2005 WR_{214}	—	March 2, 2011	Mount Lemmon	Mount Lemmon Survey	·	910 m	MPC · JPL
610069	2005 WP_{216}	—	August 1, 2016	Haleakala	Pan-STARRS 1	·	1.1 km	MPC · JPL
610070	2005 WF_{217}	—	November 28, 2005	Palomar	NEAT	·	1.6 km	MPC · JPL
610071	2005 WH_{217}	—	November 26, 2005	Kitt Peak	Spacewatch	EOS	2.0 km	MPC · JPL
610072	2005 WS_{217}	—	November 29, 2005	Kitt Peak	Spacewatch	EOS	1.4 km	MPC · JPL
610073	2005 WU_{217}	—	November 21, 2005	Kitt Peak	Spacewatch	EOS	1.8 km	MPC · JPL
610074	2005 WV_{217}	—	November 25, 2005	Kitt Peak	Spacewatch	EOS	1.7 km	MPC · JPL
610075	2005 WA_{218}	—	November 25, 2005	Kitt Peak	Spacewatch	·	870 m	MPC · JPL
610076	2005 XE_{9}	—	December 1, 2005	Kitt Peak	Spacewatch	EOS	1.8 km	MPC · JPL
610077	2005 XR_{11}	—	December 1, 2005	Kitt Peak	Spacewatch	·	2.0 km	MPC · JPL
610078	2005 XT_{11}	—	December 1, 2005	Kitt Peak	Spacewatch	·	2.3 km	MPC · JPL
610079	2005 XM_{13}	—	December 1, 2005	Kitt Peak	Spacewatch	·	1.5 km	MPC · JPL
610080	2005 XQ_{18}	—	December 1, 2005	Kitt Peak	Spacewatch	·	640 m	MPC · JPL
610081	2005 XK_{19}	—	December 2, 2005	Kitt Peak	Spacewatch	EOS	1.5 km	MPC · JPL
610082	2005 XL_{27}	—	December 6, 2005	Junk Bond	D. Healy	·	2.5 km	MPC · JPL
610083	2005 XN_{30}	—	January 12, 1996	Kitt Peak	Spacewatch	EMA	3.7 km	MPC · JPL
610084	2005 XY_{31}	—	December 2, 2005	Kitt Peak	Spacewatch	·	1.5 km	MPC · JPL
610085	2005 XQ_{38}	—	December 5, 2005	Kitt Peak	Spacewatch	EOS	1.3 km	MPC · JPL
610086	2005 XL_{41}	—	December 6, 2005	Kitt Peak	Spacewatch	·	2.8 km	MPC · JPL
610087	2005 XX_{41}	—	December 7, 2005	Kitt Peak	Spacewatch	·	2.2 km	MPC · JPL
610088	2005 XS_{45}	—	December 2, 2005	Kitt Peak	Spacewatch	·	1.3 km	MPC · JPL
610089	2005 XO_{47}	—	December 2, 2005	Kitt Peak	Spacewatch	EOS	1.6 km	MPC · JPL
610090	2005 XR_{47}	—	December 2, 2005	Kitt Peak	Spacewatch	EOS	1.6 km	MPC · JPL
610091	2005 XF_{49}	—	December 2, 2005	Kitt Peak	Spacewatch	·	1.9 km	MPC · JPL
610092	2005 XD_{50}	—	December 2, 2005	Kitt Peak	Spacewatch	EOS	2.0 km	MPC · JPL
610093	2005 XG_{52}	—	December 2, 2005	Kitt Peak	Spacewatch	·	880 m	MPC · JPL
610094	2005 XS_{52}	—	December 2, 2005	Kitt Peak	Spacewatch	·	2.0 km	MPC · JPL
610095	2005 XA_{53}	—	September 22, 2004	Kitt Peak	Spacewatch	·	2.0 km	MPC · JPL
610096	2005 XY_{55}	—	December 5, 2005	Mount Lemmon	Mount Lemmon Survey	·	2.2 km	MPC · JPL
610097	2005 XH_{58}	—	December 2, 2005	Mount Lemmon	Mount Lemmon Survey	·	1.5 km	MPC · JPL
610098	2005 XO_{61}	—	December 4, 2005	Kitt Peak	Spacewatch	·	1.7 km	MPC · JPL
610099	2005 XQ_{68}	—	November 25, 2005	Kitt Peak	Spacewatch	·	890 m	MPC · JPL
610100	2005 XY_{69}	—	December 6, 2005	Kitt Peak	Spacewatch	·	1.3 km	MPC · JPL

== 610101–610200 ==
back to top

Designation			Discovery			Properties		Ref
Permanent	Provisional	Named after	Date	Site	Discoverer(s)	Category	Diam.	Ref
610101	2005 XU_{71}	—	December 26, 2000	Kitt Peak	Spacewatch	·	3.4 km	MPC · JPL
610102	2005 XR_{72}	—	December 6, 2005	Kitt Peak	Spacewatch	·	2.9 km	MPC · JPL
610103	2005 XH_{74}	—	December 6, 2005	Kitt Peak	Spacewatch	·	1.8 km	MPC · JPL
610104	2005 XK_{74}	—	December 6, 2005	Kitt Peak	Spacewatch	·	1.8 km	MPC · JPL
610105	2005 XR_{75}	—	December 6, 2005	Kitt Peak	Spacewatch	·	1.4 km	MPC · JPL
610106	2005 XU_{82}	—	December 10, 2005	Kitt Peak	Spacewatch	3:2 · SHU	4.2 km	MPC · JPL
610107	2005 XY_{83}	—	November 3, 2005	Mount Lemmon	Mount Lemmon Survey	·	3.1 km	MPC · JPL
610108	2005 XF_{86}	—	December 7, 2005	Kitt Peak	Spacewatch	·	3.1 km	MPC · JPL
610109	2005 XM_{89}	—	December 7, 2005	Kitt Peak	Spacewatch	·	3.0 km	MPC · JPL
610110	2005 XQ_{90}	—	December 8, 2005	Kitt Peak	Spacewatch	·	2.1 km	MPC · JPL
610111	2005 XL_{91}	—	December 10, 2005	Kitt Peak	Spacewatch	EOS	1.4 km	MPC · JPL
610112	2005 XT_{100}	—	December 1, 2005	Kitt Peak	Wasserman, L. H., Millis, R. L.	THM	1.8 km	MPC · JPL
610113	2005 XC_{103}	—	January 10, 2006	Mount Lemmon	Mount Lemmon Survey	·	1.9 km	MPC · JPL
610114	2005 XW_{103}	—	December 1, 2005	Kitt Peak	Wasserman, L. H., Millis, R. L.	·	400 m	MPC · JPL
610115	2005 XT_{104}	—	December 1, 2005	Kitt Peak	Wasserman, L. H., Millis, R. L.	THM	2.0 km	MPC · JPL
610116	2005 XU_{104}	—	October 7, 2005	Mauna Kea	A. Boattini	·	2.2 km	MPC · JPL
610117	2005 XZ_{105}	—	December 1, 2005	Kitt Peak	Wasserman, L. H., Millis, R. L.	·	2.8 km	MPC · JPL
610118	2005 XK_{106}	—	December 1, 2005	Kitt Peak	Wasserman, L. H., Millis, R. L.	·	2.2 km	MPC · JPL
610119	2005 XR_{109}	—	December 1, 2005	Mount Lemmon	Mount Lemmon Survey	·	1.5 km	MPC · JPL
610120	2005 XB_{111}	—	December 3, 2005	Mauna Kea	A. Boattini	·	2.3 km	MPC · JPL
610121	2005 XC_{111}	—	December 3, 2005	Mauna Kea	A. Boattini	HYG	1.8 km	MPC · JPL
610122	2005 XY_{112}	—	April 7, 2008	Kitt Peak	Spacewatch	·	1.7 km	MPC · JPL
610123	2005 XW_{117}	—	January 17, 2015	Haleakala	Pan-STARRS 1	·	840 m	MPC · JPL
610124	2005 XP_{119}	—	August 13, 2004	Cerro Tololo	Deep Ecliptic Survey	3:2 · SHU	6.2 km	MPC · JPL
610125	2005 XR_{119}	—	December 6, 2005	Kitt Peak	Spacewatch	3:2 · SHU	4.1 km	MPC · JPL
610126	2005 XS_{120}	—	December 4, 2005	Kitt Peak	Spacewatch	·	2.9 km	MPC · JPL
610127	2005 XD_{121}	—	December 8, 2005	Kitt Peak	Spacewatch	·	2.7 km	MPC · JPL
610128	2005 XE_{121}	—	January 2, 2011	Mount Lemmon	Mount Lemmon Survey	·	2.1 km	MPC · JPL
610129	2005 XG_{121}	—	December 2, 2005	Mauna Kea	A. Boattini	·	640 m	MPC · JPL
610130	2005 XV_{121}	—	December 5, 2005	Kitt Peak	Spacewatch	H	440 m	MPC · JPL
610131	2005 XX_{121}	—	May 21, 2012	Mount Lemmon	Mount Lemmon Survey	·	1.0 km	MPC · JPL
610132	2005 XD_{122}	—	December 3, 2005	Mauna Kea	A. Boattini	·	980 m	MPC · JPL
610133	2005 XR_{122}	—	August 30, 2014	Mount Lemmon	Mount Lemmon Survey	EOS	1.4 km	MPC · JPL
610134	2005 XV_{122}	—	November 12, 2010	Mount Lemmon	Mount Lemmon Survey	·	1.4 km	MPC · JPL
610135	2005 XW_{122}	—	December 1, 2005	Kitt Peak	Spacewatch	·	2.7 km	MPC · JPL
610136	2005 XH_{123}	—	August 21, 2015	Haleakala	Pan-STARRS 1	·	1.8 km	MPC · JPL
610137	2005 XG_{124}	—	July 30, 2008	Kitt Peak	Spacewatch	·	3.1 km	MPC · JPL
610138	2005 XT_{125}	—	December 27, 2016	Mount Lemmon	Mount Lemmon Survey	·	2.2 km	MPC · JPL
610139	2005 XE_{126}	—	October 10, 2015	Haleakala	Pan-STARRS 1	·	1.4 km	MPC · JPL
610140	2005 XC_{128}	—	October 19, 2010	Mount Lemmon	Mount Lemmon Survey	·	1.7 km	MPC · JPL
610141	2005 XZ_{128}	—	December 2, 2005	Mount Lemmon	Mount Lemmon Survey	·	2.6 km	MPC · JPL
610142	2005 XJ_{129}	—	November 8, 2016	Haleakala	Pan-STARRS 1	·	2.6 km	MPC · JPL
610143	2005 XQ_{129}	—	December 2, 2005	Kitt Peak	Spacewatch	H	350 m	MPC · JPL
610144	2005 XX_{129}	—	December 5, 2005	Kitt Peak	Spacewatch	·	1.8 km	MPC · JPL
610145	2005 XJ_{130}	—	December 4, 2005	Kitt Peak	Spacewatch	·	530 m	MPC · JPL
610146	2005 XE_{133}	—	December 4, 2005	Kitt Peak	Spacewatch	·	1.4 km	MPC · JPL
610147	2005 XR_{133}	—	December 2, 2005	Kitt Peak	Spacewatch	·	2.3 km	MPC · JPL
610148	2005 XS_{133}	—	December 2, 2005	Mount Lemmon	Mount Lemmon Survey	·	2.2 km	MPC · JPL
610149	2005 XB_{134}	—	December 4, 2005	Kitt Peak	Spacewatch	3:2 · SHU	3.6 km	MPC · JPL
610150	2005 XQ_{134}	—	December 6, 2005	Kitt Peak	Spacewatch	·	820 m	MPC · JPL
610151	2005 YK_{1}	—	October 29, 2005	Catalina	CSS	·	1.6 km	MPC · JPL
610152	2005 YJ_{2}	—	October 25, 2005	Mount Lemmon	Mount Lemmon Survey	EOS	1.5 km	MPC · JPL
610153	2005 YU_{4}	—	December 21, 2005	Kitt Peak	Spacewatch	·	1.7 km	MPC · JPL
610154	2005 YE_{11}	—	December 21, 2005	Kitt Peak	Spacewatch	EOS	1.9 km	MPC · JPL
610155	2005 YU_{18}	—	October 29, 2005	Mount Lemmon	Mount Lemmon Survey	EOS	1.7 km	MPC · JPL
610156	2005 YQ_{19}	—	December 24, 2005	Kitt Peak	Spacewatch	·	1.8 km	MPC · JPL
610157	2005 YH_{21}	—	December 24, 2005	Kitt Peak	Spacewatch	EOS	2.1 km	MPC · JPL
610158	2005 YK_{25}	—	December 24, 2005	Kitt Peak	Spacewatch	·	670 m	MPC · JPL
610159	2005 YR_{28}	—	December 22, 2005	Kitt Peak	Spacewatch	·	2.4 km	MPC · JPL
610160	2005 YY_{30}	—	December 22, 2005	Kitt Peak	Spacewatch	·	2.2 km	MPC · JPL
610161	2005 YW_{39}	—	December 22, 2005	Kitt Peak	Spacewatch	EOS	1.5 km	MPC · JPL
610162	2005 YD_{44}	—	April 11, 2003	Kitt Peak	Spacewatch	·	1.3 km	MPC · JPL
610163	2005 YK_{49}	—	December 22, 2005	Kitt Peak	Spacewatch	·	780 m	MPC · JPL
610164	2005 YJ_{54}	—	November 30, 2005	Mount Lemmon	Mount Lemmon Survey	·	1.8 km	MPC · JPL
610165	2005 YZ_{58}	—	December 25, 2005	Mount Lemmon	Mount Lemmon Survey	EOS	1.8 km	MPC · JPL
610166	2005 YG_{60}	—	December 22, 2005	Kitt Peak	Spacewatch	·	2.0 km	MPC · JPL
610167	2005 YF_{62}	—	December 24, 2005	Kitt Peak	Spacewatch	·	3.3 km	MPC · JPL
610168	2005 YB_{63}	—	December 8, 2005	Kitt Peak	Spacewatch	·	2.3 km	MPC · JPL
610169	2005 YF_{66}	—	December 25, 2005	Kitt Peak	Spacewatch	·	1.1 km	MPC · JPL
610170	2005 YC_{74}	—	April 11, 2003	Kitt Peak	Spacewatch	·	2.2 km	MPC · JPL
610171	2005 YK_{76}	—	December 24, 2005	Kitt Peak	Spacewatch	EOS	1.6 km	MPC · JPL
610172	2005 YO_{76}	—	December 24, 2005	Kitt Peak	Spacewatch	·	2.2 km	MPC · JPL
610173	2005 YB_{78}	—	December 24, 2005	Kitt Peak	Spacewatch	3:2	3.2 km	MPC · JPL
610174	2005 YQ_{78}	—	December 24, 2005	Kitt Peak	Spacewatch	·	1.8 km	MPC · JPL
610175	2005 YX_{79}	—	December 1, 2005	Mount Lemmon	Mount Lemmon Survey	·	1.8 km	MPC · JPL
610176	2005 YJ_{82}	—	December 24, 2005	Kitt Peak	Spacewatch	·	2.3 km	MPC · JPL
610177	2005 YR_{83}	—	December 24, 2005	Kitt Peak	Spacewatch	·	2.4 km	MPC · JPL
610178	2005 YG_{85}	—	December 25, 2005	Mount Lemmon	Mount Lemmon Survey	EOS	2.2 km	MPC · JPL
610179	2005 YX_{85}	—	December 25, 2005	Mount Lemmon	Mount Lemmon Survey	·	2.5 km	MPC · JPL
610180	2005 YZ_{89}	—	December 26, 2005	Mount Lemmon	Mount Lemmon Survey	·	1.7 km	MPC · JPL
610181	2005 YS_{92}	—	December 27, 2005	Mount Lemmon	Mount Lemmon Survey	·	2.9 km	MPC · JPL
610182	2005 YC_{95}	—	December 25, 2005	Mount Lemmon	Mount Lemmon Survey	·	540 m	MPC · JPL
610183	2005 YW_{96}	—	November 28, 2005	Kitt Peak	Spacewatch	·	1.3 km	MPC · JPL
610184	2005 YM_{97}	—	December 24, 2005	Kitt Peak	Spacewatch	EOS	1.6 km	MPC · JPL
610185	2005 YN_{98}	—	December 26, 2005	Kitt Peak	Spacewatch	·	2.6 km	MPC · JPL
610186	2005 YE_{102}	—	December 25, 2005	Kitt Peak	Spacewatch	·	1.6 km	MPC · JPL
610187	2005 YC_{103}	—	December 25, 2005	Kitt Peak	Spacewatch	·	1.6 km	MPC · JPL
610188	2005 YW_{106}	—	December 25, 2005	Mount Lemmon	Mount Lemmon Survey	·	2.1 km	MPC · JPL
610189	2005 YB_{109}	—	December 25, 2005	Kitt Peak	Spacewatch	·	940 m	MPC · JPL
610190	2005 YP_{109}	—	December 25, 2005	Kitt Peak	Spacewatch	·	960 m	MPC · JPL
610191	2005 YL_{111}	—	December 25, 2005	Kitt Peak	Spacewatch	·	1.8 km	MPC · JPL
610192	2005 YZ_{112}	—	December 25, 2005	Mount Lemmon	Mount Lemmon Survey	·	2.0 km	MPC · JPL
610193	2005 YG_{117}	—	December 25, 2005	Kitt Peak	Spacewatch	·	1.6 km	MPC · JPL
610194	2005 YN_{118}	—	December 25, 2005	Kitt Peak	Spacewatch	·	910 m	MPC · JPL
610195	2005 YY_{134}	—	December 26, 2005	Kitt Peak	Spacewatch	·	2.1 km	MPC · JPL
610196	2005 YB_{135}	—	December 26, 2005	Kitt Peak	Spacewatch	EUP	3.5 km	MPC · JPL
610197	2005 YV_{135}	—	December 5, 2005	Mount Lemmon	Mount Lemmon Survey	·	1.6 km	MPC · JPL
610198	2005 YB_{136}	—	December 26, 2005	Kitt Peak	Spacewatch	·	1.0 km	MPC · JPL
610199	2005 YD_{136}	—	December 5, 2005	Mount Lemmon	Mount Lemmon Survey	3:2 · SHU	3.8 km	MPC · JPL
610200	2005 YK_{136}	—	December 26, 2005	Kitt Peak	Spacewatch	·	1.1 km	MPC · JPL

== 610201–610300 ==
back to top

Designation			Discovery			Properties		Ref
Permanent	Provisional	Named after	Date	Site	Discoverer(s)	Category	Diam.	Ref
610201	2005 YN_{137}	—	December 26, 2005	Kitt Peak	Spacewatch	·	2.0 km	MPC · JPL
610202	2005 YM_{139}	—	December 4, 2005	Kitt Peak	Spacewatch	·	1.1 km	MPC · JPL
610203	2005 YO_{139}	—	December 28, 2005	Kitt Peak	Spacewatch	·	550 m	MPC · JPL
610204	2005 YM_{141}	—	December 28, 2005	Mount Lemmon	Mount Lemmon Survey	EOS	1.3 km	MPC · JPL
610205	2005 YN_{142}	—	December 28, 2005	Mount Lemmon	Mount Lemmon Survey	·	1.3 km	MPC · JPL
610206	2005 YO_{142}	—	December 28, 2005	Mount Lemmon	Mount Lemmon Survey	·	2.6 km	MPC · JPL
610207	2005 YZ_{145}	—	December 29, 2005	Socorro	LINEAR	·	2.9 km	MPC · JPL
610208	2005 YB_{146}	—	December 29, 2005	Mount Lemmon	Mount Lemmon Survey	·	780 m	MPC · JPL
610209	2005 YG_{148}	—	December 25, 2005	Kitt Peak	Spacewatch	·	1.1 km	MPC · JPL
610210	2005 YS_{152}	—	December 10, 2005	Kitt Peak	Spacewatch	·	980 m	MPC · JPL
610211	2005 YK_{156}	—	November 25, 2005	Mount Lemmon	Mount Lemmon Survey	·	2.4 km	MPC · JPL
610212	2005 YT_{162}	—	December 27, 2005	Mount Lemmon	Mount Lemmon Survey	·	860 m	MPC · JPL
610213	2005 YX_{162}	—	December 27, 2005	Mount Lemmon	Mount Lemmon Survey	3:2	4.7 km	MPC · JPL
610214	2005 YG_{163}	—	December 1, 2005	Mount Lemmon	Mount Lemmon Survey	·	2.8 km	MPC · JPL
610215	2005 YL_{163}	—	December 1, 2005	Mount Lemmon	Mount Lemmon Survey	·	2.3 km	MPC · JPL
610216	2005 YF_{167}	—	December 27, 2005	Kitt Peak	Spacewatch	EOS	1.7 km	MPC · JPL
610217	2005 YR_{168}	—	December 29, 2005	Kitt Peak	Spacewatch	·	1.3 km	MPC · JPL
610218	2005 YL_{169}	—	December 10, 2005	Kitt Peak	Spacewatch	·	1.8 km	MPC · JPL
610219	2005 YJ_{170}	—	December 31, 2005	Kitt Peak	Spacewatch	·	2.3 km	MPC · JPL
610220	2005 YH_{178}	—	December 24, 2005	Kitt Peak	Spacewatch	·	3.4 km	MPC · JPL
610221	2005 YM_{179}	—	December 26, 2005	Mount Lemmon	Mount Lemmon Survey	·	810 m	MPC · JPL
610222	2005 YV_{179}	—	December 28, 2005	Mount Lemmon	Mount Lemmon Survey	·	2.7 km	MPC · JPL
610223	2005 YE_{183}	—	December 27, 2005	Kitt Peak	Spacewatch	·	1.5 km	MPC · JPL
610224	2005 YT_{184}	—	December 27, 2005	Kitt Peak	Spacewatch	T_{j} (2.99) · 3:2	3.5 km	MPC · JPL
610225	2005 YO_{185}	—	December 28, 2005	Mount Lemmon	Mount Lemmon Survey	·	1.8 km	MPC · JPL
610226	2005 YY_{186}	—	December 28, 2005	Mount Lemmon	Mount Lemmon Survey	·	1.4 km	MPC · JPL
610227	2005 YM_{189}	—	December 29, 2005	Kitt Peak	Spacewatch	·	2.4 km	MPC · JPL
610228	2005 YD_{192}	—	December 5, 2005	Mount Lemmon	Mount Lemmon Survey	EOS	1.8 km	MPC · JPL
610229	2005 YS_{193}	—	December 30, 2005	Kitt Peak	Spacewatch	·	2.7 km	MPC · JPL
610230	2005 YQ_{196}	—	December 8, 2005	Kitt Peak	Spacewatch	·	1.7 km	MPC · JPL
610231	2005 YD_{197}	—	December 25, 2005	Kitt Peak	Spacewatch	·	1.2 km	MPC · JPL
610232	2005 YP_{197}	—	December 2, 2005	Mount Lemmon	Mount Lemmon Survey	EOS	1.4 km	MPC · JPL
610233	2005 YL_{198}	—	December 25, 2005	Mount Lemmon	Mount Lemmon Survey	·	1.1 km	MPC · JPL
610234	2005 YO_{198}	—	December 25, 2005	Kitt Peak	Spacewatch	·	2.1 km	MPC · JPL
610235	2005 YO_{214}	—	October 12, 2004	Kitt Peak	Spacewatch	·	2.4 km	MPC · JPL
610236	2005 YL_{215}	—	December 29, 2005	Kitt Peak	Spacewatch	VER	2.2 km	MPC · JPL
610237	2005 YS_{218}	—	December 30, 2005	Mount Lemmon	Mount Lemmon Survey	·	2.4 km	MPC · JPL
610238	2005 YX_{219}	—	December 25, 2005	Mount Lemmon	Mount Lemmon Survey	·	720 m	MPC · JPL
610239	2005 YK_{226}	—	December 4, 2005	Mount Lemmon	Mount Lemmon Survey	·	1.9 km	MPC · JPL
610240	2005 YF_{227}	—	December 25, 2005	Mount Lemmon	Mount Lemmon Survey	·	1.9 km	MPC · JPL
610241	2005 YB_{230}	—	December 26, 2005	Kitt Peak	Spacewatch	EOS	1.6 km	MPC · JPL
610242	2005 YQ_{232}	—	April 29, 2003	Kitt Peak	Spacewatch	·	1.6 km	MPC · JPL
610243	2005 YH_{235}	—	December 28, 2005	Mount Lemmon	Mount Lemmon Survey	·	580 m	MPC · JPL
610244	2005 YJ_{235}	—	December 28, 2005	Mount Lemmon	Mount Lemmon Survey	·	1.9 km	MPC · JPL
610245	2005 YP_{240}	—	December 29, 2005	Kitt Peak	Spacewatch	HYG	3.8 km	MPC · JPL
610246	2005 YN_{243}	—	December 30, 2005	Kitt Peak	Spacewatch	·	2.5 km	MPC · JPL
610247	2005 YQ_{243}	—	December 30, 2005	Kitt Peak	Spacewatch	·	930 m	MPC · JPL
610248	2005 YF_{245}	—	August 4, 2003	Kitt Peak	Spacewatch	·	1.9 km	MPC · JPL
610249	2005 YM_{246}	—	February 20, 2001	Kitt Peak	Spacewatch	·	3.4 km	MPC · JPL
610250	2005 YF_{250}	—	December 28, 2005	Kitt Peak	Spacewatch	·	970 m	MPC · JPL
610251	2005 YH_{250}	—	December 28, 2005	Mount Lemmon	Mount Lemmon Survey	·	580 m	MPC · JPL
610252	2005 YN_{251}	—	December 28, 2005	Kitt Peak	Spacewatch	EUN	910 m	MPC · JPL
610253	2005 YQ_{252}	—	December 29, 2005	Kitt Peak	Spacewatch	EOS	2.1 km	MPC · JPL
610254	2005 YB_{253}	—	December 29, 2005	Kitt Peak	Spacewatch	EOS	2.0 km	MPC · JPL
610255	2005 YX_{254}	—	December 30, 2005	Kitt Peak	Spacewatch	·	1.0 km	MPC · JPL
610256	2005 YM_{257}	—	December 30, 2005	Kitt Peak	Spacewatch	·	2.8 km	MPC · JPL
610257	2005 YE_{258}	—	December 8, 2005	Kitt Peak	Spacewatch	·	1.2 km	MPC · JPL
610258	2005 YK_{259}	—	December 24, 2005	Kitt Peak	Spacewatch	·	860 m	MPC · JPL
610259	2005 YU_{261}	—	December 25, 2005	Kitt Peak	Spacewatch	·	1.9 km	MPC · JPL
610260	2005 YZ_{261}	—	December 25, 2005	Kitt Peak	Spacewatch	·	2.6 km	MPC · JPL
610261	2005 YP_{262}	—	November 10, 2005	Mount Lemmon	Mount Lemmon Survey	·	3.5 km	MPC · JPL
610262	2005 YA_{263}	—	December 25, 2005	Kitt Peak	Spacewatch	EOS	1.5 km	MPC · JPL
610263	2005 YV_{264}	—	January 13, 2002	Kitt Peak	Spacewatch	·	1.2 km	MPC · JPL
610264	2005 YE_{266}	—	December 27, 2005	Kitt Peak	Spacewatch	·	1.2 km	MPC · JPL
610265	2005 YU_{267}	—	December 25, 2005	Mount Lemmon	Mount Lemmon Survey	·	650 m	MPC · JPL
610266	2005 YY_{267}	—	December 25, 2005	Mount Lemmon	Mount Lemmon Survey	·	2.3 km	MPC · JPL
610267	2005 YD_{268}	—	December 25, 2005	Mount Lemmon	Mount Lemmon Survey	·	2.1 km	MPC · JPL
610268	2005 YK_{268}	—	December 25, 2005	Mount Lemmon	Mount Lemmon Survey	·	2.3 km	MPC · JPL
610269	2005 YV_{269}	—	December 26, 2005	Kitt Peak	Spacewatch	·	1.1 km	MPC · JPL
610270	2005 YL_{274}	—	December 5, 2005	Mount Lemmon	Mount Lemmon Survey	EOS	2.0 km	MPC · JPL
610271	2005 YO_{274}	—	December 30, 2005	Kitt Peak	Spacewatch	·	2.2 km	MPC · JPL
610272	2005 YS_{275}	—	November 26, 2005	Mount Lemmon	Mount Lemmon Survey	·	3.0 km	MPC · JPL
610273	2005 YA_{276}	—	December 21, 2005	Kitt Peak	Spacewatch	·	1.1 km	MPC · JPL
610274	2005 YF_{276}	—	December 22, 2005	Kitt Peak	Spacewatch	·	2.4 km	MPC · JPL
610275	2005 YK_{277}	—	December 25, 2005	Kitt Peak	Spacewatch	·	500 m	MPC · JPL
610276	2005 YF_{278}	—	December 25, 2005	Kitt Peak	Spacewatch	·	1.3 km	MPC · JPL
610277	2005 YA_{280}	—	December 25, 2005	Kitt Peak	Spacewatch	EOS	1.3 km	MPC · JPL
610278	2005 YH_{280}	—	December 25, 2005	Mount Lemmon	Mount Lemmon Survey	THM	1.7 km	MPC · JPL
610279	2005 YJ_{280}	—	December 25, 2005	Mount Lemmon	Mount Lemmon Survey	·	2.2 km	MPC · JPL
610280	2005 YA_{281}	—	December 25, 2005	Kitt Peak	Spacewatch	·	2.1 km	MPC · JPL
610281	2005 YB_{281}	—	December 25, 2005	Kitt Peak	Spacewatch	·	540 m	MPC · JPL
610282	2005 YN_{284}	—	December 28, 2005	Mount Lemmon	Mount Lemmon Survey	(5)	1.0 km	MPC · JPL
610283	2005 YU_{284}	—	December 28, 2005	Mount Lemmon	Mount Lemmon Survey	MAR	820 m	MPC · JPL
610284	2005 YV_{285}	—	December 30, 2005	Kitt Peak	Spacewatch	·	930 m	MPC · JPL
610285	2005 YA_{286}	—	December 30, 2005	Kitt Peak	Spacewatch	·	2.1 km	MPC · JPL
610286	2005 YS_{291}	—	December 25, 2005	Mount Lemmon	Mount Lemmon Survey	·	2.0 km	MPC · JPL
610287	2005 YU_{293}	—	December 28, 2005	Mount Lemmon	Mount Lemmon Survey	MAR	1.0 km	MPC · JPL
610288	2005 YX_{293}	—	December 31, 2005	Kitt Peak	Spacewatch	·	900 m	MPC · JPL
610289	2005 YK_{294}	—	April 10, 2010	Kitt Peak	Spacewatch	·	610 m	MPC · JPL
610290	2005 YT_{294}	—	July 8, 2014	Haleakala	Pan-STARRS 1	EOS	1.4 km	MPC · JPL
610291	2005 YU_{294}	—	May 8, 2013	Haleakala	Pan-STARRS 1	·	2.1 km	MPC · JPL
610292	2005 YE_{295}	—	March 16, 2012	Haleakala	Pan-STARRS 1	EOS	1.4 km	MPC · JPL
610293	2005 YN_{295}	—	November 11, 2010	Mount Lemmon	Mount Lemmon Survey	·	1.9 km	MPC · JPL
610294	2005 YS_{295}	—	December 27, 2005	Mount Lemmon	Mount Lemmon Survey	3:2 · SHU	3.6 km	MPC · JPL
610295	2005 YB_{296}	—	January 19, 2012	Haleakala	Pan-STARRS 1	·	2.5 km	MPC · JPL
610296	2005 YV_{296}	—	December 2, 2010	Mount Lemmon	Mount Lemmon Survey	LIX	3.2 km	MPC · JPL
610297	2005 YO_{297}	—	December 13, 2013	Mount Lemmon	Mount Lemmon Survey	·	1.1 km	MPC · JPL
610298	2005 YS_{297}	—	February 15, 2012	Haleakala	Pan-STARRS 1	·	3.2 km	MPC · JPL
610299	2005 YW_{297}	—	April 22, 2017	Mount Lemmon	Mount Lemmon Survey	H	510 m	MPC · JPL
610300	2005 YF_{298}	—	September 23, 2015	Haleakala	Pan-STARRS 1	·	1.7 km	MPC · JPL

== 610301–610400 ==
back to top

Designation			Discovery			Properties		Ref
Permanent	Provisional	Named after	Date	Site	Discoverer(s)	Category	Diam.	Ref
610301	2005 YR_{298}	—	January 2, 2017	Haleakala	Pan-STARRS 1	EOS	1.5 km	MPC · JPL
610302	2005 YV_{298}	—	November 12, 2010	Mount Lemmon	Mount Lemmon Survey	EOS	1.4 km	MPC · JPL
610303	2005 YX_{298}	—	August 8, 2016	Haleakala	Pan-STARRS 1	EUN	920 m	MPC · JPL
610304	2005 YF_{299}	—	September 4, 2014	Haleakala	Pan-STARRS 1	EOS	1.4 km	MPC · JPL
610305	2005 YV_{300}	—	December 28, 2005	Kitt Peak	Spacewatch	EOS	1.6 km	MPC · JPL
610306	2005 YG_{301}	—	December 25, 2005	Mount Lemmon	Mount Lemmon Survey	·	1.4 km	MPC · JPL
610307	2005 YU_{301}	—	December 29, 2005	Mount Lemmon	Mount Lemmon Survey	·	2.3 km	MPC · JPL
610308	2006 AG_{8}	—	January 5, 2006	Catalina	CSS	·	3.1 km	MPC · JPL
610309	2006 AK_{9}	—	January 4, 2006	Kitt Peak	Spacewatch	LIX	2.7 km	MPC · JPL
610310	2006 AM_{14}	—	December 6, 2005	Mount Lemmon	Mount Lemmon Survey	EOS	2.1 km	MPC · JPL
610311	2006 AU_{17}	—	January 5, 2006	Kitt Peak	Spacewatch	EOS	1.6 km	MPC · JPL
610312	2006 AS_{22}	—	January 4, 2006	Kitt Peak	Spacewatch	·	1.0 km	MPC · JPL
610313	2006 AN_{23}	—	December 25, 2005	Mount Lemmon	Mount Lemmon Survey	·	1.5 km	MPC · JPL
610314	2006 AU_{24}	—	January 5, 2006	Kitt Peak	Spacewatch	·	2.4 km	MPC · JPL
610315	2006 AY_{26}	—	January 5, 2006	Mount Lemmon	Mount Lemmon Survey	EOS	1.9 km	MPC · JPL
610316	2006 AQ_{29}	—	December 30, 2005	Kitt Peak	Spacewatch	EOS	1.4 km	MPC · JPL
610317	2006 AX_{32}	—	January 5, 2006	Kitt Peak	Spacewatch	·	2.9 km	MPC · JPL
610318	2006 AK_{35}	—	January 4, 2006	Kitt Peak	Spacewatch	·	2.5 km	MPC · JPL
610319	2006 AA_{39}	—	December 25, 2005	Mount Lemmon	Mount Lemmon Survey	·	1.4 km	MPC · JPL
610320	2006 AQ_{41}	—	January 5, 2006	Mount Lemmon	Mount Lemmon Survey	·	1.3 km	MPC · JPL
610321	2006 AY_{42}	—	January 6, 2006	Kitt Peak	Spacewatch	·	990 m	MPC · JPL
610322	2006 AG_{49}	—	January 5, 2006	Kitt Peak	Spacewatch	·	1.5 km	MPC · JPL
610323	2006 AY_{51}	—	January 5, 2006	Kitt Peak	Spacewatch	H	480 m	MPC · JPL
610324	2006 AZ_{51}	—	December 2, 2005	Mount Lemmon	Mount Lemmon Survey	·	3.3 km	MPC · JPL
610325	2006 AV_{52}	—	December 26, 2005	Mount Lemmon	Mount Lemmon Survey	·	1.0 km	MPC · JPL
610326	2006 AU_{53}	—	December 28, 2005	Kitt Peak	Spacewatch	·	1.1 km	MPC · JPL
610327	2006 AG_{55}	—	January 5, 2006	Kitt Peak	Spacewatch	·	1.5 km	MPC · JPL
610328	2006 AK_{55}	—	January 5, 2006	Kitt Peak	Spacewatch	EOS	1.5 km	MPC · JPL
610329	2006 AL_{55}	—	January 5, 2006	Kitt Peak	Spacewatch	·	470 m	MPC · JPL
610330	2006 AH_{60}	—	January 5, 2006	Kitt Peak	Spacewatch	·	2.3 km	MPC · JPL
610331	2006 AL_{60}	—	January 5, 2006	Kitt Peak	Spacewatch	THM	2.1 km	MPC · JPL
610332	2006 AU_{60}	—	January 5, 2006	Kitt Peak	Spacewatch	TEL	1.1 km	MPC · JPL
610333	2006 AO_{67}	—	January 9, 2006	Kitt Peak	Spacewatch	·	1.2 km	MPC · JPL
610334	2006 AQ_{68}	—	January 5, 2006	Mount Lemmon	Mount Lemmon Survey	·	2.4 km	MPC · JPL
610335	2006 AW_{71}	—	January 6, 2006	Kitt Peak	Spacewatch	·	1.9 km	MPC · JPL
610336	2006 AH_{76}	—	January 5, 2006	Kitt Peak	Spacewatch	·	2.0 km	MPC · JPL
610337	2006 AJ_{77}	—	December 25, 2005	Kitt Peak	Spacewatch	·	940 m	MPC · JPL
610338	2006 AZ_{88}	—	January 5, 2006	Mount Lemmon	Mount Lemmon Survey	TIR	2.2 km	MPC · JPL
610339	2006 AX_{89}	—	January 5, 2006	Mount Lemmon	Mount Lemmon Survey	·	2.3 km	MPC · JPL
610340	2006 AX_{91}	—	January 7, 2006	Mount Lemmon	Mount Lemmon Survey	·	1.1 km	MPC · JPL
610341	2006 AF_{92}	—	January 7, 2006	Mount Lemmon	Mount Lemmon Survey	·	2.3 km	MPC · JPL
610342	2006 AE_{93}	—	January 7, 2006	Kitt Peak	Spacewatch	·	1.4 km	MPC · JPL
610343	2006 AW_{94}	—	December 30, 2005	Kitt Peak	Spacewatch	·	3.3 km	MPC · JPL
610344	2006 AW_{95}	—	January 8, 2006	Mount Lemmon	Mount Lemmon Survey	·	2.6 km	MPC · JPL
610345	2006 AL_{99}	—	December 27, 2005	Mount Lemmon	Mount Lemmon Survey	·	930 m	MPC · JPL
610346	2006 AW_{103}	—	September 19, 2003	Kitt Peak	Spacewatch	VER	2.5 km	MPC · JPL
610347	2006 AK_{104}	—	January 7, 2006	Mount Lemmon	Mount Lemmon Survey	TIR	2.9 km	MPC · JPL
610348	2006 AO_{104}	—	January 10, 2006	Mount Lemmon	Mount Lemmon Survey	·	2.8 km	MPC · JPL
610349	2006 AZ_{107}	—	January 7, 2006	Kitt Peak	Spacewatch	EOS	1.6 km	MPC · JPL
610350	2006 AE_{108}	—	January 10, 2006	Mount Lemmon	Mount Lemmon Survey	·	780 m	MPC · JPL
610351	2006 AV_{108}	—	September 24, 2008	Catalina	CSS	MAR	1.1 km	MPC · JPL
610352	2006 AX_{108}	—	November 3, 2010	Kitt Peak	Spacewatch	·	2.2 km	MPC · JPL
610353	2006 AY_{108}	—	June 12, 2013	Haleakala	Pan-STARRS 1	·	2.7 km	MPC · JPL
610354	2006 AX_{109}	—	January 10, 2006	Kitt Peak	Spacewatch	·	730 m	MPC · JPL
610355	2006 AD_{110}	—	January 7, 2006	Kitt Peak	Spacewatch	EOS	1.6 km	MPC · JPL
610356	2006 AM_{110}	—	June 16, 2012	Haleakala	Pan-STARRS 1	H	450 m	MPC · JPL
610357	2006 AR_{110}	—	January 4, 2011	Mount Lemmon	Mount Lemmon Survey	·	2.0 km	MPC · JPL
610358	2006 AU_{110}	—	January 5, 2006	Kitt Peak	Spacewatch	EOS	1.5 km	MPC · JPL
610359	2006 AX_{110}	—	January 7, 2006	Kitt Peak	Spacewatch	EMA	3.0 km	MPC · JPL
610360	2006 AD_{111}	—	January 2, 2006	Mount Lemmon	Mount Lemmon Survey	·	2.8 km	MPC · JPL
610361	2006 AL_{111}	—	January 8, 2006	Kitt Peak	Spacewatch	·	2.7 km	MPC · JPL
610362	2006 AT_{111}	—	August 28, 2014	Haleakala	Pan-STARRS 1	·	2.3 km	MPC · JPL
610363	2006 AF_{112}	—	May 15, 2013	Haleakala	Pan-STARRS 1	·	2.5 km	MPC · JPL
610364	2006 AT_{112}	—	January 4, 2006	Kitt Peak	Spacewatch	·	1.6 km	MPC · JPL
610365	2006 AV_{112}	—	December 13, 2015	Haleakala	Pan-STARRS 1	·	2.0 km	MPC · JPL
610366	2006 AY_{112}	—	September 30, 2009	Mount Lemmon	Mount Lemmon Survey	·	1.7 km	MPC · JPL
610367	2006 AH_{113}	—	January 9, 2006	Mount Lemmon	Mount Lemmon Survey	EOS	1.3 km	MPC · JPL
610368	2006 AU_{113}	—	August 22, 2014	Haleakala	Pan-STARRS 1	EOS	1.6 km	MPC · JPL
610369	2006 AK_{114}	—	November 1, 2015	Mount Lemmon	Mount Lemmon Survey	·	2.7 km	MPC · JPL
610370	2006 AW_{114}	—	January 4, 2006	Kitt Peak	Spacewatch	H	320 m	MPC · JPL
610371	2006 AB_{115}	—	January 5, 2006	Mount Lemmon	Mount Lemmon Survey	URS	2.6 km	MPC · JPL
610372	2006 AO_{115}	—	January 7, 2006	Kitt Peak	Spacewatch	·	690 m	MPC · JPL
610373	2006 AW_{115}	—	January 7, 2006	Mount Lemmon	Mount Lemmon Survey	3:2	4.2 km	MPC · JPL
610374	2006 AL_{116}	—	January 10, 2006	Kitt Peak	Spacewatch	·	1.5 km	MPC · JPL
610375	2006 BL_{1}	—	January 19, 2006	Catalina	CSS	H	490 m	MPC · JPL
610376	2006 BA_{3}	—	December 25, 2005	Kitt Peak	Spacewatch	·	2.6 km	MPC · JPL
610377	2006 BR_{3}	—	December 22, 2005	Kitt Peak	Spacewatch	·	560 m	MPC · JPL
610378	2006 BE_{5}	—	January 21, 2006	Kitt Peak	Spacewatch	·	1.1 km	MPC · JPL
610379	2006 BR_{7}	—	January 7, 2006	Mount Lemmon	Mount Lemmon Survey	H	590 m	MPC · JPL
610380	2006 BM_{15}	—	January 22, 2006	Mount Lemmon	Mount Lemmon Survey	·	1.1 km	MPC · JPL
610381	2006 BD_{19}	—	January 22, 2006	Mount Lemmon	Mount Lemmon Survey	·	2.2 km	MPC · JPL
610382	2006 BP_{27}	—	January 22, 2006	Mount Lemmon	Mount Lemmon Survey	·	2.0 km	MPC · JPL
610383	2006 BC_{28}	—	January 8, 2006	Kitt Peak	Spacewatch	EOS	1.7 km	MPC · JPL
610384	2006 BW_{29}	—	December 5, 2005	Mount Lemmon	Mount Lemmon Survey	T_{j} (2.99) · 3:2	5.0 km	MPC · JPL
610385	2006 BW_{35}	—	January 23, 2006	Kitt Peak	Spacewatch	·	2.8 km	MPC · JPL
610386	2006 BH_{37}	—	January 23, 2006	Mount Lemmon	Mount Lemmon Survey	EOS	1.7 km	MPC · JPL
610387	2006 BU_{38}	—	January 10, 2006	Mount Lemmon	Mount Lemmon Survey	·	1.5 km	MPC · JPL
610388	2006 BE_{42}	—	December 29, 2005	Kitt Peak	Spacewatch	·	1.6 km	MPC · JPL
610389	2006 BQ_{43}	—	January 23, 2006	Catalina	CSS	H	460 m	MPC · JPL
610390	2006 BN_{44}	—	January 23, 2006	Mount Lemmon	Mount Lemmon Survey	·	2.8 km	MPC · JPL
610391	2006 BB_{50}	—	January 25, 2006	Kitt Peak	Spacewatch	·	2.4 km	MPC · JPL
610392	2006 BD_{53}	—	January 25, 2006	Kitt Peak	Spacewatch	·	2.5 km	MPC · JPL
610393	2006 BF_{53}	—	January 25, 2006	Kitt Peak	Spacewatch	(5)	970 m	MPC · JPL
610394	2006 BE_{58}	—	January 8, 2006	Mount Lemmon	Mount Lemmon Survey	·	2.3 km	MPC · JPL
610395	2006 BR_{63}	—	January 22, 2006	Mount Lemmon	Mount Lemmon Survey	EOS	1.7 km	MPC · JPL
610396	2006 BG_{64}	—	January 6, 2006	Kitt Peak	Spacewatch	·	2.5 km	MPC · JPL
610397	2006 BY_{64}	—	January 22, 2006	Mount Lemmon	Mount Lemmon Survey	·	580 m	MPC · JPL
610398	2006 BH_{67}	—	January 23, 2006	Kitt Peak	Spacewatch	·	2.5 km	MPC · JPL
610399	2006 BH_{70}	—	January 23, 2006	Kitt Peak	Spacewatch	·	770 m	MPC · JPL
610400	2006 BL_{70}	—	January 23, 2006	Kitt Peak	Spacewatch	·	950 m	MPC · JPL

== 610401–610500 ==
back to top

Designation			Discovery			Properties		Ref
Permanent	Provisional	Named after	Date	Site	Discoverer(s)	Category	Diam.	Ref
610401	2006 BF_{72}	—	January 23, 2006	Kitt Peak	Spacewatch	·	2.3 km	MPC · JPL
610402	2006 BZ_{72}	—	January 23, 2006	Kitt Peak	Spacewatch	H	320 m	MPC · JPL
610403	2006 BD_{77}	—	January 23, 2006	Mount Lemmon	Mount Lemmon Survey	·	2.1 km	MPC · JPL
610404	2006 BD_{79}	—	February 22, 2002	Palomar	NEAT	·	1.4 km	MPC · JPL
610405	2006 BO_{85}	—	January 25, 2006	Kitt Peak	Spacewatch	EOS	1.5 km	MPC · JPL
610406	2006 BF_{87}	—	January 25, 2006	Kitt Peak	Spacewatch	·	820 m	MPC · JPL
610407	2006 BM_{93}	—	January 26, 2006	Catalina	CSS	·	2.0 km	MPC · JPL
610408	2006 BO_{101}	—	January 23, 2006	Mount Lemmon	Mount Lemmon Survey	·	580 m	MPC · JPL
610409	2006 BK_{104}	—	January 8, 2006	Kitt Peak	Spacewatch	·	1.6 km	MPC · JPL
610410	2006 BW_{106}	—	January 25, 2006	Kitt Peak	Spacewatch	·	1.8 km	MPC · JPL
610411	2006 BL_{111}	—	October 7, 2005	Mauna Kea	A. Boattini	EOS	2.0 km	MPC · JPL
610412	2006 BR_{118}	—	January 26, 2006	Kitt Peak	Spacewatch	·	2.6 km	MPC · JPL
610413	2006 BN_{120}	—	January 26, 2006	Kitt Peak	Spacewatch	·	2.6 km	MPC · JPL
610414	2006 BG_{121}	—	January 26, 2006	Kitt Peak	Spacewatch	·	610 m	MPC · JPL
610415	2006 BT_{121}	—	January 26, 2006	Mount Lemmon	Mount Lemmon Survey	·	470 m	MPC · JPL
610416	2006 BU_{128}	—	January 26, 2006	Mount Lemmon	Mount Lemmon Survey	·	3.1 km	MPC · JPL
610417	2006 BY_{128}	—	March 21, 1998	Kitt Peak	Spacewatch	·	1.3 km	MPC · JPL
610418	2006 BR_{130}	—	December 2, 2005	Kitt Peak	Wasserman, L. H., Millis, R. L.	·	1.8 km	MPC · JPL
610419	2006 BN_{131}	—	January 26, 2006	Mount Lemmon	Mount Lemmon Survey	·	2.9 km	MPC · JPL
610420	2006 BQ_{132}	—	January 26, 2006	Kitt Peak	Spacewatch	·	2.4 km	MPC · JPL
610421	2006 BR_{134}	—	January 25, 2006	Kitt Peak	Spacewatch	·	2.6 km	MPC · JPL
610422	2006 BJ_{137}	—	January 28, 2006	Mount Lemmon	Mount Lemmon Survey	·	3.4 km	MPC · JPL
610423	2006 BM_{137}	—	January 28, 2006	Mount Lemmon	Mount Lemmon Survey	EMA	2.7 km	MPC · JPL
610424	2006 BU_{137}	—	January 28, 2006	Mount Lemmon	Mount Lemmon Survey	·	1.9 km	MPC · JPL
610425	2006 BM_{140}	—	January 9, 2006	Mount Lemmon	Mount Lemmon Survey	·	1.6 km	MPC · JPL
610426	2006 BF_{143}	—	January 27, 2006	Kitt Peak	Spacewatch	VER	2.7 km	MPC · JPL
610427	2006 BO_{143}	—	January 28, 2006	Mount Lemmon	Mount Lemmon Survey	·	2.7 km	MPC · JPL
610428	2006 BD_{148}	—	January 24, 2006	Socorro	LINEAR	H	540 m	MPC · JPL
610429	2006 BA_{149}	—	January 23, 2006	Catalina	CSS	·	2.7 km	MPC · JPL
610430	2006 BX_{150}	—	January 25, 2006	Mount Lemmon	Mount Lemmon Survey	·	1.0 km	MPC · JPL
610431	2006 BZ_{150}	—	January 25, 2006	Kitt Peak	Spacewatch	·	1.0 km	MPC · JPL
610432	2006 BE_{160}	—	January 26, 2006	Kitt Peak	Spacewatch	·	520 m	MPC · JPL
610433	2006 BR_{160}	—	January 26, 2006	Kitt Peak	Spacewatch	·	2.0 km	MPC · JPL
610434	2006 BS_{160}	—	January 26, 2006	Kitt Peak	Spacewatch	EOS	2.0 km	MPC · JPL
610435	2006 BQ_{161}	—	January 26, 2006	Kitt Peak	Spacewatch	·	2.3 km	MPC · JPL
610436	2006 BT_{164}	—	January 26, 2006	Kitt Peak	Spacewatch	·	1.1 km	MPC · JPL
610437	2006 BC_{170}	—	January 26, 2006	Mount Lemmon	Mount Lemmon Survey	EOS	2.0 km	MPC · JPL
610438	2006 BG_{170}	—	January 27, 2006	Kitt Peak	Spacewatch	·	2.4 km	MPC · JPL
610439	2006 BM_{170}	—	January 27, 2006	Kitt Peak	Spacewatch	EOS	1.4 km	MPC · JPL
610440	2006 BU_{172}	—	December 25, 2005	Mount Lemmon	Mount Lemmon Survey	·	2.2 km	MPC · JPL
610441	2006 BW_{178}	—	January 7, 2006	Mount Lemmon	Mount Lemmon Survey	·	740 m	MPC · JPL
610442	2006 BN_{179}	—	January 27, 2006	Mount Lemmon	Mount Lemmon Survey	·	3.1 km	MPC · JPL
610443	2006 BS_{179}	—	January 27, 2006	Mount Lemmon	Mount Lemmon Survey	·	2.1 km	MPC · JPL
610444	2006 BU_{180}	—	January 27, 2006	Mount Lemmon	Mount Lemmon Survey	HNS	1.1 km	MPC · JPL
610445	2006 BL_{181}	—	January 27, 2006	Mount Lemmon	Mount Lemmon Survey	·	480 m	MPC · JPL
610446	2006 BO_{182}	—	January 27, 2006	Mount Lemmon	Mount Lemmon Survey	·	2.7 km	MPC · JPL
610447	2006 BU_{182}	—	January 27, 2006	Mount Lemmon	Mount Lemmon Survey	EUP	3.0 km	MPC · JPL
610448	2006 BQ_{185}	—	January 28, 2006	Mount Lemmon	Mount Lemmon Survey	MAR	970 m	MPC · JPL
610449	2006 BY_{186}	—	January 28, 2006	Kitt Peak	Spacewatch	·	2.6 km	MPC · JPL
610450	2006 BS_{192}	—	January 30, 2006	Kitt Peak	Spacewatch	(7605)	2.7 km	MPC · JPL
610451	2006 BH_{195}	—	January 30, 2006	Kitt Peak	Spacewatch	EUN	950 m	MPC · JPL
610452	2006 BF_{198}	—	January 30, 2006	Kitt Peak	Spacewatch	·	2.5 km	MPC · JPL
610453	2006 BK_{198}	—	January 30, 2006	Kitt Peak	Spacewatch	EUN	1.4 km	MPC · JPL
610454	2006 BS_{202}	—	January 31, 2006	Kitt Peak	Spacewatch	·	1.2 km	MPC · JPL
610455	2006 BU_{202}	—	January 31, 2006	Kitt Peak	Spacewatch	EUN	1.0 km	MPC · JPL
610456	2006 BV_{202}	—	January 31, 2006	Kitt Peak	Spacewatch	TIR	2.1 km	MPC · JPL
610457	2006 BC_{203}	—	October 24, 2005	Mauna Kea	A. Boattini	·	2.8 km	MPC · JPL
610458	2006 BK_{204}	—	January 31, 2006	Kitt Peak	Spacewatch	EOS	1.6 km	MPC · JPL
610459	2006 BJ_{206}	—	January 31, 2006	Mount Lemmon	Mount Lemmon Survey	·	2.0 km	MPC · JPL
610460	2006 BB_{207}	—	January 9, 2006	Kitt Peak	Spacewatch	·	1.8 km	MPC · JPL
610461	2006 BD_{209}	—	January 31, 2006	Mount Lemmon	Mount Lemmon Survey	·	2.3 km	MPC · JPL
610462	2006 BN_{209}	—	January 31, 2006	Mount Lemmon	Mount Lemmon Survey	·	520 m	MPC · JPL
610463	2006 BP_{209}	—	January 26, 2006	Kitt Peak	Spacewatch	EOS	1.7 km	MPC · JPL
610464	2006 BA_{210}	—	January 31, 2006	Kitt Peak	Spacewatch	·	2.9 km	MPC · JPL
610465	2006 BJ_{219}	—	January 28, 2006	Mount Lemmon	Mount Lemmon Survey	·	1.9 km	MPC · JPL
610466	2006 BB_{220}	—	January 8, 2006	Kitt Peak	Spacewatch	·	3.0 km	MPC · JPL
610467	2006 BC_{221}	—	January 30, 2006	Kitt Peak	Spacewatch	·	1.8 km	MPC · JPL
610468	2006 BR_{222}	—	January 30, 2006	Kitt Peak	Spacewatch	(5)	1.0 km	MPC · JPL
610469	2006 BZ_{223}	—	November 7, 2005	Mauna Kea	A. Boattini	·	2.2 km	MPC · JPL
610470	2006 BQ_{230}	—	January 31, 2006	Kitt Peak	Spacewatch	·	520 m	MPC · JPL
610471	2006 BV_{233}	—	January 23, 2006	Kitt Peak	Spacewatch	EOS	1.9 km	MPC · JPL
610472	2006 BK_{234}	—	January 31, 2006	Kitt Peak	Spacewatch	·	1.1 km	MPC · JPL
610473	2006 BS_{234}	—	January 23, 2006	Mount Lemmon	Mount Lemmon Survey	·	2.6 km	MPC · JPL
610474	2006 BA_{235}	—	January 31, 2006	Kitt Peak	Spacewatch	·	650 m	MPC · JPL
610475	2006 BJ_{237}	—	January 31, 2006	Kitt Peak	Spacewatch	·	2.1 km	MPC · JPL
610476	2006 BA_{239}	—	January 4, 2006	Kitt Peak	Spacewatch	(5)	820 m	MPC · JPL
610477	2006 BL_{239}	—	January 31, 2006	Kitt Peak	Spacewatch	THM	2.2 km	MPC · JPL
610478	2006 BO_{239}	—	January 31, 2006	Kitt Peak	Spacewatch	·	1.9 km	MPC · JPL
610479	2006 BT_{240}	—	October 24, 2005	Mauna Kea	A. Boattini	·	3.0 km	MPC · JPL
610480	2006 BJ_{242}	—	January 31, 2006	Kitt Peak	Spacewatch	EUN	1.1 km	MPC · JPL
610481	2006 BW_{242}	—	January 31, 2006	Kitt Peak	Spacewatch	EUN	860 m	MPC · JPL
610482	2006 BE_{244}	—	January 31, 2006	Kitt Peak	Spacewatch	·	1.2 km	MPC · JPL
610483	2006 BK_{244}	—	January 31, 2006	Kitt Peak	Spacewatch	·	2.6 km	MPC · JPL
610484	2006 BL_{244}	—	October 24, 2005	Mauna Kea	A. Boattini	VER	2.4 km	MPC · JPL
610485	2006 BZ_{246}	—	January 31, 2006	Kitt Peak	Spacewatch	ELF	3.2 km	MPC · JPL
610486	2006 BF_{251}	—	January 31, 2006	Kitt Peak	Spacewatch	·	2.3 km	MPC · JPL
610487	2006 BK_{252}	—	October 24, 2005	Mauna Kea	A. Boattini	·	1.9 km	MPC · JPL
610488	2006 BC_{256}	—	January 31, 2006	Kitt Peak	Spacewatch	·	3.4 km	MPC · JPL
610489	2006 BH_{256}	—	January 31, 2006	Kitt Peak	Spacewatch	·	2.5 km	MPC · JPL
610490	2006 BZ_{256}	—	January 31, 2006	Kitt Peak	Spacewatch	·	3.3 km	MPC · JPL
610491	2006 BC_{257}	—	January 31, 2006	Kitt Peak	Spacewatch	·	1.1 km	MPC · JPL
610492	2006 BG_{259}	—	January 31, 2006	Kitt Peak	Spacewatch	·	2.3 km	MPC · JPL
610493	2006 BK_{264}	—	January 31, 2006	Kitt Peak	Spacewatch	·	580 m	MPC · JPL
610494	2006 BQ_{266}	—	January 27, 2006	Mount Lemmon	Mount Lemmon Survey	EOS	1.7 km	MPC · JPL
610495	2006 BC_{270}	—	January 30, 2006	Catalina	CSS	·	2.6 km	MPC · JPL
610496	2006 BS_{275}	—	January 7, 2006	Mount Lemmon	Mount Lemmon Survey	EOS	2.3 km	MPC · JPL
610497	2006 BU_{277}	—	January 30, 2006	Kitt Peak	Spacewatch	·	1.7 km	MPC · JPL
610498	2006 BA_{279}	—	January 30, 2006	Kitt Peak	Spacewatch	THM	1.9 km	MPC · JPL
610499	2006 BJ_{282}	—	January 23, 2006	Kitt Peak	Spacewatch	·	3.0 km	MPC · JPL
610500	2006 BK_{284}	—	December 23, 2000	Apache Point	SDSS Collaboration	EOS	2.0 km	MPC · JPL

== 610501–610600 ==
back to top

Designation			Discovery			Properties		Ref
Permanent	Provisional	Named after	Date	Site	Discoverer(s)	Category	Diam.	Ref
610501	2006 BO_{285}	—	December 30, 2005	Kitt Peak	Spacewatch	·	920 m	MPC · JPL
610502	2006 BQ_{286}	—	January 23, 2006	Kitt Peak	Spacewatch	·	750 m	MPC · JPL
610503	2006 BR_{286}	—	May 7, 2011	Kitt Peak	Spacewatch	·	940 m	MPC · JPL
610504	2006 BH_{287}	—	January 30, 2006	Kitt Peak	Spacewatch	·	950 m	MPC · JPL
610505	2006 BK_{287}	—	January 6, 2010	Kitt Peak	Spacewatch	·	970 m	MPC · JPL
610506	2006 BN_{287}	—	May 15, 2013	Haleakala	Pan-STARRS 1	EOS	1.6 km	MPC · JPL
610507	2006 BU_{287}	—	January 31, 2006	Kitt Peak	Spacewatch	·	510 m	MPC · JPL
610508	2006 BN_{288}	—	January 31, 2006	Kitt Peak	Spacewatch	EOS	1.7 km	MPC · JPL
610509	2006 BP_{288}	—	January 7, 2006	Mount Lemmon	Mount Lemmon Survey	·	3.6 km	MPC · JPL
610510	2006 BS_{288}	—	December 3, 2015	Haleakala	Pan-STARRS 1	·	2.2 km	MPC · JPL
610511	2006 BH_{289}	—	January 31, 2006	Mount Lemmon	Mount Lemmon Survey	·	1.2 km	MPC · JPL
610512	2006 BK_{289}	—	September 18, 2014	Haleakala	Pan-STARRS 1	·	2.4 km	MPC · JPL
610513	2006 BS_{289}	—	January 27, 2006	Mount Lemmon	Mount Lemmon Survey	·	2.7 km	MPC · JPL
610514	2006 BU_{289}	—	January 23, 2006	Kitt Peak	Spacewatch	·	2.2 km	MPC · JPL
610515	2006 BK_{290}	—	January 26, 2006	Kitt Peak	Spacewatch	EOS	2.0 km	MPC · JPL
610516	2006 BM_{290}	—	January 12, 2011	Mount Lemmon	Mount Lemmon Survey	EOS	1.8 km	MPC · JPL
610517	2006 BN_{290}	—	October 24, 2008	Kitt Peak	Spacewatch	·	830 m	MPC · JPL
610518	2006 BO_{290}	—	July 31, 2014	Haleakala	Pan-STARRS 1	EOS	1.7 km	MPC · JPL
610519	2006 BT_{290}	—	July 25, 2008	Mount Lemmon	Mount Lemmon Survey	·	3.4 km	MPC · JPL
610520	2006 BF_{291}	—	January 31, 2006	Mount Lemmon	Mount Lemmon Survey	(5)	1.1 km	MPC · JPL
610521	2006 BG_{291}	—	November 20, 2008	Mount Lemmon	Mount Lemmon Survey	·	530 m	MPC · JPL
610522	2006 BJ_{291}	—	December 27, 2005	Kitt Peak	Spacewatch	·	1.3 km	MPC · JPL
610523	2006 BK_{291}	—	October 9, 2008	Mount Lemmon	Mount Lemmon Survey	·	890 m	MPC · JPL
610524	2006 BO_{291}	—	January 23, 2006	Kitt Peak	Spacewatch	·	1.0 km	MPC · JPL
610525	2006 BS_{291}	—	October 1, 2014	Haleakala	Pan-STARRS 1	·	2.5 km	MPC · JPL
610526	2006 BT_{291}	—	February 28, 2014	Haleakala	Pan-STARRS 1	·	830 m	MPC · JPL
610527	2006 BE_{292}	—	October 1, 2014	Haleakala	Pan-STARRS 1	·	2.5 km	MPC · JPL
610528	2006 BO_{292}	—	January 31, 2006	Kitt Peak	Spacewatch	·	1.3 km	MPC · JPL
610529	2006 BM_{293}	—	January 22, 2006	Mount Lemmon	Mount Lemmon Survey	EOS	1.7 km	MPC · JPL
610530	2006 BN_{293}	—	January 23, 2006	Kitt Peak	Spacewatch	·	490 m	MPC · JPL
610531	2006 BW_{293}	—	January 23, 2006	Mount Lemmon	Mount Lemmon Survey	ARM	2.7 km	MPC · JPL
610532	2006 BD_{294}	—	January 26, 2017	Mount Lemmon	Mount Lemmon Survey	·	1.9 km	MPC · JPL
610533	2006 BJ_{294}	—	May 21, 2018	Haleakala	Pan-STARRS 1	EOS	1.4 km	MPC · JPL
610534	2006 BR_{295}	—	January 13, 2011	Mount Lemmon	Mount Lemmon Survey	·	2.0 km	MPC · JPL
610535	2006 BT_{295}	—	January 26, 2017	Mount Lemmon	Mount Lemmon Survey	·	2.2 km	MPC · JPL
610536	2006 BV_{295}	—	July 14, 2016	Mount Lemmon	Mount Lemmon Survey	·	950 m	MPC · JPL
610537	2006 BG_{296}	—	January 23, 2006	Kitt Peak	Spacewatch	·	1.2 km	MPC · JPL
610538	2006 BF_{297}	—	January 28, 2006	Mount Lemmon	Mount Lemmon Survey	·	2.1 km	MPC · JPL
610539	2006 BQ_{298}	—	January 31, 2006	Kitt Peak	Spacewatch	·	2.6 km	MPC · JPL
610540	2006 BR_{298}	—	January 27, 2006	Kitt Peak	Spacewatch	EOS	1.4 km	MPC · JPL
610541	2006 BU_{298}	—	January 27, 2006	Kitt Peak	Spacewatch	·	750 m	MPC · JPL
610542	2006 BZ_{298}	—	January 31, 2006	Kitt Peak	Spacewatch	MAR	770 m	MPC · JPL
610543	2006 BP_{299}	—	January 23, 2006	Mount Lemmon	Mount Lemmon Survey	·	1.9 km	MPC · JPL
610544	2006 BW_{299}	—	January 27, 2006	Kitt Peak	Spacewatch	·	2.5 km	MPC · JPL
610545	2006 BX_{299}	—	January 23, 2006	Mount Lemmon	Mount Lemmon Survey	·	2.2 km	MPC · JPL
610546	2006 CY_{2}	—	February 1, 2006	Mount Lemmon	Mount Lemmon Survey	·	1.2 km	MPC · JPL
610547	2006 CA_{3}	—	January 27, 2006	Kitt Peak	Spacewatch	EOS	1.9 km	MPC · JPL
610548	2006 CY_{3}	—	February 1, 2006	Mount Lemmon	Mount Lemmon Survey	EOS	1.7 km	MPC · JPL
610549	2006 CH_{4}	—	July 16, 2004	Cerro Tololo	Deep Ecliptic Survey	·	690 m	MPC · JPL
610550	2006 CZ_{7}	—	November 7, 2005	Mauna Kea	A. Boattini	·	640 m	MPC · JPL
610551	2006 CT_{14}	—	February 1, 2006	Kitt Peak	Spacewatch	·	880 m	MPC · JPL
610552	2006 CB_{15}	—	February 1, 2006	Kitt Peak	Spacewatch	·	2.5 km	MPC · JPL
610553	2006 CV_{15}	—	January 23, 2006	Kitt Peak	Spacewatch	·	3.0 km	MPC · JPL
610554	2006 CU_{18}	—	February 1, 2006	Kitt Peak	Spacewatch	HNS	980 m	MPC · JPL
610555	2006 CA_{20}	—	February 1, 2006	Mount Lemmon	Mount Lemmon Survey	VER	2.3 km	MPC · JPL
610556	2006 CY_{21}	—	February 1, 2006	Kitt Peak	Spacewatch	·	3.0 km	MPC · JPL
610557	2006 CL_{24}	—	February 2, 2006	Kitt Peak	Spacewatch	·	2.2 km	MPC · JPL
610558	2006 CA_{25}	—	January 22, 2006	Mount Lemmon	Mount Lemmon Survey	·	890 m	MPC · JPL
610559	2006 CQ_{25}	—	February 7, 2002	Kitt Peak	Spacewatch	·	820 m	MPC · JPL
610560	2006 CX_{26}	—	January 22, 2006	Mount Lemmon	Mount Lemmon Survey	·	2.1 km	MPC · JPL
610561	2006 CW_{27}	—	February 2, 2006	Kitt Peak	Spacewatch	·	560 m	MPC · JPL
610562	2006 CU_{28}	—	February 2, 2006	Kitt Peak	Spacewatch	·	2.8 km	MPC · JPL
610563	2006 CC_{29}	—	March 6, 1994	Kitt Peak	Spacewatch	·	1.2 km	MPC · JPL
610564	2006 CD_{29}	—	January 23, 2006	Mount Lemmon	Mount Lemmon Survey	EOS	1.7 km	MPC · JPL
610565	2006 CQ_{29}	—	February 2, 2006	Kitt Peak	Spacewatch	·	2.5 km	MPC · JPL
610566	2006 CV_{29}	—	February 2, 2006	Kitt Peak	Spacewatch	·	2.3 km	MPC · JPL
610567	2006 CK_{32}	—	February 2, 2006	Kitt Peak	Spacewatch	VER	2.2 km	MPC · JPL
610568	2006 CU_{37}	—	January 26, 2006	Kitt Peak	Spacewatch	·	3.0 km	MPC · JPL
610569	2006 CA_{39}	—	February 2, 2006	Kitt Peak	Spacewatch	·	2.2 km	MPC · JPL
610570	2006 CZ_{40}	—	February 2, 2006	Kitt Peak	Spacewatch	·	1.8 km	MPC · JPL
610571	2006 CL_{41}	—	February 2, 2006	Kitt Peak	Spacewatch	H	450 m	MPC · JPL
610572	2006 CR_{44}	—	January 26, 2006	Catalina	CSS	·	3.0 km	MPC · JPL
610573	2006 CG_{45}	—	February 7, 2006	Kitt Peak	Spacewatch	EOS	1.3 km	MPC · JPL
610574	2006 CP_{47}	—	February 6, 2006	Mount Lemmon	Mount Lemmon Survey	MAR	820 m	MPC · JPL
610575	2006 CN_{48}	—	February 3, 2006	Mount Lemmon	Mount Lemmon Survey	·	1.9 km	MPC · JPL
610576	2006 CJ_{50}	—	August 13, 2004	Cerro Tololo	Deep Ecliptic Survey	·	620 m	MPC · JPL
610577	2006 CT_{51}	—	January 22, 2006	Mount Lemmon	Mount Lemmon Survey	THM	2.1 km	MPC · JPL
610578	2006 CB_{54}	—	February 4, 2006	Mount Lemmon	Mount Lemmon Survey	·	1.0 km	MPC · JPL
610579	2006 CN_{54}	—	January 22, 2006	Mount Lemmon	Mount Lemmon Survey	EOS	1.7 km	MPC · JPL
610580	2006 CF_{56}	—	January 30, 2006	Kitt Peak	Spacewatch	·	510 m	MPC · JPL
610581	2006 CC_{64}	—	February 2, 2006	Mauna Kea	P. A. Wiegert	·	2.4 km	MPC · JPL
610582	2006 CJ_{64}	—	December 5, 2005	Kitt Peak	Spacewatch	·	620 m	MPC · JPL
610583	2006 CP_{72}	—	November 25, 2005	Mount Lemmon	Mount Lemmon Survey	·	2.1 km	MPC · JPL
610584	2006 CO_{74}	—	February 3, 2006	Mauna Kea	P. A. Wiegert, R. Rasmussen	·	2.7 km	MPC · JPL
610585	2006 CH_{76}	—	February 5, 2006	Mount Lemmon	Mount Lemmon Survey	·	810 m	MPC · JPL
610586	2006 CV_{79}	—	February 1, 2006	Kitt Peak	Spacewatch	·	1.0 km	MPC · JPL
610587	2006 CO_{81}	—	February 1, 2006	Kitt Peak	Spacewatch	·	2.9 km	MPC · JPL
610588	2006 CX_{81}	—	December 7, 2015	Haleakala	Pan-STARRS 1	·	3.1 km	MPC · JPL
610589	2006 CA_{82}	—	February 1, 2006	Kitt Peak	Spacewatch	(5)	880 m	MPC · JPL
610590	2006 CG_{82}	—	February 1, 2012	Mount Lemmon	Mount Lemmon Survey	TIR	2.3 km	MPC · JPL
610591	2006 CP_{82}	—	December 10, 2010	Mount Lemmon	Mount Lemmon Survey	·	2.1 km	MPC · JPL
610592	2006 CT_{82}	—	February 4, 2006	Kitt Peak	Spacewatch	·	2.5 km	MPC · JPL
610593	2006 CV_{82}	—	November 7, 2010	Mount Lemmon	Mount Lemmon Survey	·	2.7 km	MPC · JPL
610594	2006 CA_{83}	—	February 1, 2006	Kitt Peak	Spacewatch	·	2.0 km	MPC · JPL
610595	2006 CC_{83}	—	May 24, 2011	Haleakala	Pan-STARRS 1	·	1.2 km	MPC · JPL
610596	2006 CD_{83}	—	March 18, 2013	Mount Lemmon	Mount Lemmon Survey	·	580 m	MPC · JPL
610597	2006 CL_{83}	—	July 5, 2016	Haleakala	Pan-STARRS 1	·	850 m	MPC · JPL
610598	2006 CK_{84}	—	January 30, 2017	Haleakala	Pan-STARRS 1	·	2.5 km	MPC · JPL
610599	2006 CH_{85}	—	February 1, 2006	Kitt Peak	Spacewatch	·	910 m	MPC · JPL
610600	2006 CK_{85}	—	June 10, 2007	Kitt Peak	Spacewatch	LUT	3.2 km	MPC · JPL

== 610601–610700 ==
back to top

Designation			Discovery			Properties		Ref
Permanent	Provisional	Named after	Date	Site	Discoverer(s)	Category	Diam.	Ref
610601	2006 CP_{87}	—	December 8, 2010	Mount Lemmon	Mount Lemmon Survey	EOS	1.7 km	MPC · JPL
610602	2006 CF_{89}	—	September 18, 2012	Mount Lemmon	Mount Lemmon Survey	·	860 m	MPC · JPL
610603	2006 DN_{8}	—	February 21, 2006	Mount Lemmon	Mount Lemmon Survey	·	2.8 km	MPC · JPL
610604	2006 DZ_{8}	—	February 21, 2006	Catalina	CSS	EUN	1.2 km	MPC · JPL
610605	2006 DO_{20}	—	February 20, 2006	Mount Lemmon	Mount Lemmon Survey	EUP	2.7 km	MPC · JPL
610606	2006 DN_{21}	—	January 31, 2006	Kitt Peak	Spacewatch	MAR	780 m	MPC · JPL
610607	2006 DX_{24}	—	February 20, 2006	Kitt Peak	Spacewatch	·	2.7 km	MPC · JPL
610608	2006 DT_{25}	—	February 20, 2006	Kitt Peak	Spacewatch	·	580 m	MPC · JPL
610609	2006 DD_{31}	—	February 20, 2006	Kitt Peak	Spacewatch	·	1.6 km	MPC · JPL
610610	2006 DR_{35}	—	February 20, 2006	Kitt Peak	Spacewatch	·	3.1 km	MPC · JPL
610611	2006 DF_{37}	—	February 20, 2006	Kitt Peak	Spacewatch	THM	1.9 km	MPC · JPL
610612	2006 DQ_{43}	—	February 20, 2006	Kitt Peak	Spacewatch	·	1.1 km	MPC · JPL
610613	2006 DP_{48}	—	February 21, 2006	Catalina	CSS	·	930 m	MPC · JPL
610614	2006 DX_{52}	—	February 24, 2006	Catalina	CSS	·	1.6 km	MPC · JPL
610615	2006 DR_{55}	—	February 24, 2006	Mount Lemmon	Mount Lemmon Survey	EUN	680 m	MPC · JPL
610616	2006 DM_{70}	—	February 21, 2006	Mount Lemmon	Mount Lemmon Survey	·	1.2 km	MPC · JPL
610617	2006 DY_{71}	—	February 21, 2006	Mount Lemmon	Mount Lemmon Survey	·	2.8 km	MPC · JPL
610618	2006 DJ_{75}	—	September 17, 2003	Kitt Peak	Spacewatch	·	2.9 km	MPC · JPL
610619	2006 DS_{75}	—	February 24, 2006	Mount Lemmon	Mount Lemmon Survey	H	560 m	MPC · JPL
610620	2006 DP_{76}	—	February 24, 2006	Kitt Peak	Spacewatch	·	960 m	MPC · JPL
610621	2006 DM_{77}	—	February 6, 2006	Mount Lemmon	Mount Lemmon Survey	·	2.4 km	MPC · JPL
610622	2006 DC_{81}	—	February 24, 2006	Kitt Peak	Spacewatch	·	1.1 km	MPC · JPL
610623	2006 DA_{84}	—	February 24, 2006	Kitt Peak	Spacewatch	·	1.9 km	MPC · JPL
610624	2006 DD_{84}	—	February 24, 2006	Kitt Peak	Spacewatch	·	2.4 km	MPC · JPL
610625	2006 DQ_{85}	—	February 24, 2006	Mount Lemmon	Mount Lemmon Survey	·	530 m	MPC · JPL
610626	2006 DW_{89}	—	February 24, 2006	Kitt Peak	Spacewatch	·	1.1 km	MPC · JPL
610627	2006 DZ_{89}	—	February 24, 2006	Kitt Peak	Spacewatch	·	2.7 km	MPC · JPL
610628	2006 DA_{92}	—	February 24, 2006	Mount Lemmon	Mount Lemmon Survey	·	2.9 km	MPC · JPL
610629	2006 DN_{93}	—	February 20, 2006	Kitt Peak	Spacewatch	THM	2.1 km	MPC · JPL
610630	2006 DN_{104}	—	January 7, 2006	Mount Lemmon	Mount Lemmon Survey	·	3.9 km	MPC · JPL
610631	2006 DS_{111}	—	October 24, 2005	Mauna Kea	A. Boattini	·	2.2 km	MPC · JPL
610632	2006 DX_{111}	—	December 2, 2005	Kitt Peak	Wasserman, L. H., Millis, R. L.	·	1.0 km	MPC · JPL
610633	2006 DH_{114}	—	October 23, 2004	Kitt Peak	Spacewatch	EUN	1.4 km	MPC · JPL
610634	2006 DN_{115}	—	February 27, 2006	Catalina	CSS	·	3.1 km	MPC · JPL
610635	2006 DE_{127}	—	February 25, 2006	Kitt Peak	Spacewatch	EOS	1.8 km	MPC · JPL
610636	2006 DL_{130}	—	February 25, 2006	Kitt Peak	Spacewatch	(5)	1.0 km	MPC · JPL
610637	2006 DG_{132}	—	February 25, 2006	Kitt Peak	Spacewatch	·	2.1 km	MPC · JPL
610638	2006 DT_{133}	—	February 1, 2006	Kitt Peak	Spacewatch	·	2.1 km	MPC · JPL
610639	2006 DR_{135}	—	February 2, 2006	Kitt Peak	Spacewatch	EUN	890 m	MPC · JPL
610640	2006 DZ_{139}	—	February 25, 2006	Kitt Peak	Spacewatch	·	2.4 km	MPC · JPL
610641	2006 DG_{141}	—	October 15, 2001	Palomar	NEAT	·	760 m	MPC · JPL
610642	2006 DZ_{148}	—	February 25, 2006	Kitt Peak	Spacewatch	VER	2.5 km	MPC · JPL
610643	2006 DF_{149}	—	February 25, 2006	Kitt Peak	Spacewatch	·	2.1 km	MPC · JPL
610644	2006 DG_{151}	—	February 25, 2006	Mount Lemmon	Mount Lemmon Survey	·	1.5 km	MPC · JPL
610645	2006 DV_{153}	—	February 5, 2000	Kitt Peak	Spacewatch	·	2.8 km	MPC · JPL
610646	2006 DN_{155}	—	February 25, 2006	Kitt Peak	Spacewatch	·	1.5 km	MPC · JPL
610647	2006 DF_{158}	—	February 27, 2006	Kitt Peak	Spacewatch	·	980 m	MPC · JPL
610648	2006 DR_{158}	—	February 27, 2006	Kitt Peak	Spacewatch	·	2.4 km	MPC · JPL
610649	2006 DB_{161}	—	February 27, 2006	Kitt Peak	Spacewatch	·	1.8 km	MPC · JPL
610650	2006 DX_{163}	—	February 27, 2006	Mount Lemmon	Mount Lemmon Survey	·	1.1 km	MPC · JPL
610651	2006 DY_{163}	—	February 27, 2006	Mount Lemmon	Mount Lemmon Survey	·	1.2 km	MPC · JPL
610652	2006 DU_{167}	—	October 4, 2004	Kitt Peak	Spacewatch	(5)	1.1 km	MPC · JPL
610653	2006 DD_{170}	—	February 27, 2006	Kitt Peak	Spacewatch	·	550 m	MPC · JPL
610654	2006 DV_{170}	—	February 27, 2006	Kitt Peak	Spacewatch	TIR	2.4 km	MPC · JPL
610655	2006 DT_{174}	—	February 27, 2006	Kitt Peak	Spacewatch	·	1.1 km	MPC · JPL
610656	2006 DL_{175}	—	February 27, 2006	Mount Lemmon	Mount Lemmon Survey	·	2.2 km	MPC · JPL
610657	2006 DY_{175}	—	February 27, 2006	Mount Lemmon	Mount Lemmon Survey	·	990 m	MPC · JPL
610658	2006 DZ_{176}	—	September 18, 2003	Kitt Peak	Spacewatch	EOS	1.7 km	MPC · JPL
610659	2006 DL_{180}	—	February 27, 2006	Mount Lemmon	Mount Lemmon Survey	·	2.4 km	MPC · JPL
610660	2006 DG_{182}	—	January 23, 2006	Mount Lemmon	Mount Lemmon Survey	·	2.2 km	MPC · JPL
610661	2006 DM_{182}	—	September 19, 2003	Kitt Peak	Spacewatch	·	2.9 km	MPC · JPL
610662	2006 DP_{184}	—	February 27, 2006	Mount Lemmon	Mount Lemmon Survey	·	950 m	MPC · JPL
610663	2006 DT_{184}	—	February 27, 2006	Mount Lemmon	Mount Lemmon Survey	VER	2.2 km	MPC · JPL
610664	2006 DJ_{186}	—	October 27, 2003	Kitt Peak	Spacewatch	VER	3.0 km	MPC · JPL
610665	2006 DU_{187}	—	February 27, 2006	Kitt Peak	Spacewatch	·	2.7 km	MPC · JPL
610666	2006 DA_{194}	—	October 18, 2004	Kitt Peak	Deep Ecliptic Survey	THM	1.6 km	MPC · JPL
610667	2006 DV_{199}	—	February 24, 2006	Catalina	CSS	·	3.4 km	MPC · JPL
610668	2006 DC_{202}	—	March 18, 2002	Kitt Peak	Spacewatch	·	1.1 km	MPC · JPL
610669	2006 DB_{203}	—	February 22, 2006	Anderson Mesa	LONEOS	EOS	2.3 km	MPC · JPL
610670	2006 DJ_{204}	—	February 25, 2006	Catalina	CSS	·	2.3 km	MPC · JPL
610671	2006 DV_{207}	—	February 25, 2006	Kitt Peak	Spacewatch	·	930 m	MPC · JPL
610672	2006 DR_{208}	—	February 25, 2006	Kitt Peak	Spacewatch	·	500 m	MPC · JPL
610673	2006 DF_{212}	—	February 25, 2006	Mount Lemmon	Mount Lemmon Survey	·	480 m	MPC · JPL
610674	2006 DM_{219}	—	July 25, 2003	Socorro	LINEAR	·	1.4 km	MPC · JPL
610675	2006 DU_{219}	—	February 25, 2006	Mount Lemmon	Mount Lemmon Survey	·	920 m	MPC · JPL
610676	2006 DY_{219}	—	February 25, 2012	Catalina	CSS	·	2.9 km	MPC · JPL
610677	2006 DL_{220}	—	January 23, 2011	Mount Lemmon	Mount Lemmon Survey	·	2.2 km	MPC · JPL
610678	2006 DP_{220}	—	February 24, 2006	Kitt Peak	Spacewatch	(5)	840 m	MPC · JPL
610679	2006 DE_{221}	—	December 24, 2013	Mount Lemmon	Mount Lemmon Survey	H	410 m	MPC · JPL
610680	2006 DZ_{221}	—	September 23, 2008	Kitt Peak	Spacewatch	·	930 m	MPC · JPL
610681	2006 DC_{222}	—	February 20, 2006	Kitt Peak	Spacewatch	·	1.1 km	MPC · JPL
610682	2006 DF_{222}	—	November 17, 2004	Siding Spring	SSS	·	2.9 km	MPC · JPL
610683	2006 DY_{222}	—	May 13, 2007	Kitt Peak	Spacewatch	·	2.3 km	MPC · JPL
610684	2006 DA_{223}	—	April 12, 2012	Haleakala	Pan-STARRS 1	·	2.4 km	MPC · JPL
610685	2006 DK_{223}	—	March 22, 2015	Haleakala	Pan-STARRS 1	·	1.1 km	MPC · JPL
610686	2006 DL_{223}	—	March 13, 2016	Haleakala	Pan-STARRS 1	·	530 m	MPC · JPL
610687	2006 DN_{223}	—	October 6, 2008	Kitt Peak	Spacewatch	·	990 m	MPC · JPL
610688	2006 DT_{223}	—	January 23, 2011	Mount Lemmon	Mount Lemmon Survey	·	2.8 km	MPC · JPL
610689	2006 DU_{223}	—	February 27, 2014	Kitt Peak	Spacewatch	·	1.2 km	MPC · JPL
610690	2006 DW_{223}	—	April 12, 2016	Haleakala	Pan-STARRS 1	·	530 m	MPC · JPL
610691	2006 EJ_{4}	—	March 2, 2006	Kitt Peak	Spacewatch	·	1.7 km	MPC · JPL
610692	2006 EE_{5}	—	February 20, 2006	Kitt Peak	Spacewatch	·	1.0 km	MPC · JPL
610693	2006 EX_{8}	—	December 3, 2005	Mauna Kea	A. Boattini	THM	2.0 km	MPC · JPL
610694	2006 EH_{9}	—	March 2, 2006	Kitt Peak	Spacewatch	·	2.5 km	MPC · JPL
610695	2006 EC_{11}	—	March 2, 2006	Kitt Peak	Spacewatch	THM	1.8 km	MPC · JPL
610696	2006 EM_{13}	—	March 2, 2006	Kitt Peak	Spacewatch	·	2.2 km	MPC · JPL
610697	2006 EL_{20}	—	February 22, 2006	Catalina	CSS	BAR	1.1 km	MPC · JPL
610698	2006 EN_{21}	—	March 3, 2006	Kitt Peak	Spacewatch	HYG	2.4 km	MPC · JPL
610699	2006 EP_{24}	—	February 21, 2006	Mount Lemmon	Mount Lemmon Survey	·	2.2 km	MPC · JPL
610700	2006 EU_{25}	—	February 2, 2006	Kitt Peak	Spacewatch	·	2.4 km	MPC · JPL

== 610701–610800 ==
back to top

Designation			Discovery			Properties		Ref
Permanent	Provisional	Named after	Date	Site	Discoverer(s)	Category	Diam.	Ref
610701	2006 ER_{27}	—	March 3, 2006	Kitt Peak	Spacewatch	EOS	1.7 km	MPC · JPL
610702	2006 EJ_{28}	—	March 21, 2002	Kitt Peak	Spacewatch	·	1.1 km	MPC · JPL
610703	2006 EU_{28}	—	March 3, 2006	Kitt Peak	Spacewatch	·	1.0 km	MPC · JPL
610704	2006 ES_{29}	—	March 3, 2006	Kitt Peak	Spacewatch	·	2.5 km	MPC · JPL
610705	2006 EV_{29}	—	February 2, 2006	Mount Lemmon	Mount Lemmon Survey	EUP	3.3 km	MPC · JPL
610706	2006 EO_{31}	—	March 3, 2006	Kitt Peak	Spacewatch	·	1.5 km	MPC · JPL
610707	2006 EV_{31}	—	March 3, 2006	Kitt Peak	Spacewatch	·	2.7 km	MPC · JPL
610708	2006 EB_{34}	—	December 3, 2005	Mauna Kea	A. Boattini	·	1.1 km	MPC · JPL
610709	2006 ER_{34}	—	March 3, 2006	Kitt Peak	Spacewatch	·	1.0 km	MPC · JPL
610710	2006 EL_{37}	—	March 3, 2006	Kitt Peak	Spacewatch	·	2.5 km	MPC · JPL
610711	2006 EM_{45}	—	January 31, 2006	Kitt Peak	Spacewatch	THM	1.8 km	MPC · JPL
610712	2006 EX_{45}	—	March 3, 2006	Kitt Peak	Spacewatch	·	2.6 km	MPC · JPL
610713	2006 EC_{48}	—	March 4, 2006	Kitt Peak	Spacewatch	·	2.9 km	MPC · JPL
610714	2006 ES_{48}	—	February 1, 2006	Kitt Peak	Spacewatch	·	2.5 km	MPC · JPL
610715	2006 EU_{48}	—	January 31, 2006	Kitt Peak	Spacewatch	·	560 m	MPC · JPL
610716	2006 EW_{48}	—	February 25, 2006	Kitt Peak	Spacewatch	BRG	1.3 km	MPC · JPL
610717	2006 EZ_{48}	—	March 4, 2006	Kitt Peak	Spacewatch	·	2.1 km	MPC · JPL
610718	2006 EF_{49}	—	March 4, 2006	Kitt Peak	Spacewatch	·	760 m	MPC · JPL
610719	2006 EG_{52}	—	February 24, 2006	Mount Lemmon	Mount Lemmon Survey	·	1.1 km	MPC · JPL
610720	2006 ES_{53}	—	March 3, 2006	Kitt Peak	Spacewatch	·	2.9 km	MPC · JPL
610721	2006 EY_{57}	—	October 24, 2005	Mauna Kea	A. Boattini	EOS	1.9 km	MPC · JPL
610722	2006 EX_{58}	—	December 2, 2005	Mauna Kea	A. Boattini	URS	2.8 km	MPC · JPL
610723	2006 EO_{59}	—	March 5, 2006	Kitt Peak	Spacewatch	HYG	2.8 km	MPC · JPL
610724	2006 EQ_{59}	—	March 5, 2006	Kitt Peak	Spacewatch	·	2.6 km	MPC · JPL
610725	2006 ER_{59}	—	March 5, 2006	Kitt Peak	Spacewatch	·	2.5 km	MPC · JPL
610726	2006 ED_{61}	—	March 5, 2006	Kitt Peak	Spacewatch	EOS	1.8 km	MPC · JPL
610727	2006 ED_{64}	—	March 5, 2006	Kitt Peak	Spacewatch	·	1.8 km	MPC · JPL
610728	2006 EG_{64}	—	March 5, 2006	Kitt Peak	Spacewatch	·	1.2 km	MPC · JPL
610729	2006 EQ_{64}	—	March 5, 2006	Kitt Peak	Spacewatch	·	2.1 km	MPC · JPL
610730	2006 EW_{64}	—	March 5, 2006	Kitt Peak	Spacewatch	·	2.0 km	MPC · JPL
610731	2006 ES_{66}	—	March 8, 2006	Kitt Peak	Spacewatch	·	530 m	MPC · JPL
610732	2006 ET_{75}	—	December 4, 2015	Haleakala	Pan-STARRS 1	EOS	1.6 km	MPC · JPL
610733	2006 EJ_{76}	—	March 4, 2006	Mount Lemmon	Mount Lemmon Survey	·	560 m	MPC · JPL
610734	2006 EK_{76}	—	March 3, 2006	Anderson Mesa	LONEOS	EUN	1.0 km	MPC · JPL
610735	2006 ET_{76}	—	February 15, 2010	Kitt Peak	Spacewatch	RAF	710 m	MPC · JPL
610736	2006 EZ_{76}	—	July 31, 2014	Haleakala	Pan-STARRS 1	·	2.5 km	MPC · JPL
610737	2006 EE_{77}	—	October 10, 2015	Haleakala	Pan-STARRS 1	EUP	3.1 km	MPC · JPL
610738	2006 EG_{77}	—	January 27, 2006	Kitt Peak	Spacewatch	·	2.7 km	MPC · JPL
610739	2006 EL_{77}	—	March 15, 2013	Kitt Peak	Spacewatch	·	480 m	MPC · JPL
610740	2006 ER_{77}	—	January 29, 2011	Mount Lemmon	Mount Lemmon Survey	·	2.1 km	MPC · JPL
610741	2006 EY_{77}	—	January 30, 2011	Mount Lemmon	Mount Lemmon Survey	·	2.8 km	MPC · JPL
610742	2006 EZ_{77}	—	August 22, 2014	Haleakala	Pan-STARRS 1	·	2.3 km	MPC · JPL
610743	2006 EB_{78}	—	March 18, 2013	Kitt Peak	Spacewatch	PHO	610 m	MPC · JPL
610744	2006 EP_{78}	—	January 9, 2014	Haleakala	Pan-STARRS 1	·	980 m	MPC · JPL
610745	2006 ER_{78}	—	December 2, 2012	Mount Lemmon	Mount Lemmon Survey	·	1.0 km	MPC · JPL
610746	2006 EA_{79}	—	March 2, 2006	Kitt Peak	Spacewatch	·	600 m	MPC · JPL
610747	2006 EB_{79}	—	September 23, 2014	Mount Lemmon	Mount Lemmon Survey	·	2.4 km	MPC · JPL
610748	2006 EH_{79}	—	October 15, 2012	Haleakala	Pan-STARRS 1	·	1.1 km	MPC · JPL
610749	2006 EK_{79}	—	September 6, 2008	Mount Lemmon	Mount Lemmon Survey	·	2.5 km	MPC · JPL
610750	2006 EX_{79}	—	March 12, 2010	Kitt Peak	Spacewatch	·	1.1 km	MPC · JPL
610751	2006 EY_{79}	—	March 3, 2006	Kitt Peak	Spacewatch	·	2.2 km	MPC · JPL
610752	2006 EC_{80}	—	June 15, 2010	Mount Lemmon	Mount Lemmon Survey	·	630 m	MPC · JPL
610753	2006 EZ_{80}	—	March 21, 2015	Haleakala	Pan-STARRS 1	·	1.2 km	MPC · JPL
610754	2006 EZ_{81}	—	March 4, 2006	Mount Lemmon	Mount Lemmon Survey	·	560 m	MPC · JPL
610755	2006 ED_{82}	—	March 2, 2006	Kitt Peak	Spacewatch	·	1.4 km	MPC · JPL
610756	2006 FM_{5}	—	February 24, 2006	Kitt Peak	Spacewatch	·	810 m	MPC · JPL
610757	2006 FW_{5}	—	March 23, 2006	Mount Lemmon	Mount Lemmon Survey	·	580 m	MPC · JPL
610758	2006 FV_{20}	—	March 4, 2006	Mount Lemmon	Mount Lemmon Survey	·	2.7 km	MPC · JPL
610759	2006 FR_{22}	—	March 24, 2006	Mount Lemmon	Mount Lemmon Survey	·	540 m	MPC · JPL
610760	2006 FU_{25}	—	March 24, 2006	Mount Lemmon	Mount Lemmon Survey	·	760 m	MPC · JPL
610761	2006 FN_{30}	—	March 25, 2006	Kitt Peak	Spacewatch	·	740 m	MPC · JPL
610762	2006 FA_{31}	—	October 31, 2005	Mauna Kea	A. Boattini	·	920 m	MPC · JPL
610763	2006 FA_{32}	—	March 25, 2006	Kitt Peak	Spacewatch	·	660 m	MPC · JPL
610764	2006 FN_{37}	—	March 24, 2006	Siding Spring	SSS	TIR	3.6 km	MPC · JPL
610765	2006 FC_{39}	—	December 3, 2005	Mauna Kea	A. Boattini	·	560 m	MPC · JPL
610766	2006 FF_{47}	—	March 23, 2006	Catalina	CSS	·	2.9 km	MPC · JPL
610767	2006 FC_{56}	—	March 24, 2006	Mount Lemmon	Mount Lemmon Survey	·	540 m	MPC · JPL
610768	2006 FN_{56}	—	March 24, 2006	Kitt Peak	Spacewatch	·	620 m	MPC · JPL
610769	2006 FR_{56}	—	January 27, 2011	Kitt Peak	Spacewatch	·	1.8 km	MPC · JPL
610770	2006 FS_{56}	—	March 23, 2006	Kitt Peak	Spacewatch	URS	3.0 km	MPC · JPL
610771	2006 FT_{56}	—	March 25, 2006	Kitt Peak	Spacewatch	·	1.4 km	MPC · JPL
610772	2006 FX_{56}	—	February 11, 2016	Mount Lemmon	Mount Lemmon Survey	·	510 m	MPC · JPL
610773	2006 FC_{57}	—	December 13, 2010	Mount Lemmon	Mount Lemmon Survey	·	3.1 km	MPC · JPL
610774	2006 FH_{57}	—	April 20, 2012	Mount Lemmon	Mount Lemmon Survey	ELF	3.1 km	MPC · JPL
610775	2006 FK_{57}	—	January 25, 2011	Kitt Peak	Spacewatch	VER	2.3 km	MPC · JPL
610776	2006 FQ_{57}	—	October 10, 2016	Haleakala	Pan-STARRS 1	HNS	1.1 km	MPC · JPL
610777	2006 FU_{57}	—	February 5, 2011	Haleakala	Pan-STARRS 1	·	2.2 km	MPC · JPL
610778	2006 FA_{58}	—	March 23, 2006	Kitt Peak	Spacewatch	·	2.0 km	MPC · JPL
610779	2006 FB_{58}	—	March 23, 2006	Kitt Peak	Spacewatch	·	2.1 km	MPC · JPL
610780	2006 FK_{58}	—	October 24, 2014	Kitt Peak	Spacewatch	·	620 m	MPC · JPL
610781	2006 FX_{58}	—	March 4, 2006	Kitt Peak	Spacewatch	·	550 m	MPC · JPL
610782	2006 FQ_{59}	—	October 6, 2012	Mount Lemmon	Mount Lemmon Survey	·	1.1 km	MPC · JPL
610783	2006 FT_{59}	—	January 3, 2017	Haleakala	Pan-STARRS 1	·	2.6 km	MPC · JPL
610784	2006 FA_{60}	—	March 23, 2006	Mount Lemmon	Mount Lemmon Survey	·	600 m	MPC · JPL
610785	2006 FZ_{60}	—	March 26, 2006	Kitt Peak	Spacewatch	EUN	960 m	MPC · JPL
610786	2006 GR_{2}	—	April 4, 2006	Lulin	LUSS	H	610 m	MPC · JPL
610787	2006 GY_{3}	—	February 24, 2006	Mount Lemmon	Mount Lemmon Survey	·	630 m	MPC · JPL
610788	2006 GR_{7}	—	April 2, 2006	Kitt Peak	Spacewatch	·	2.4 km	MPC · JPL
610789	2006 GZ_{14}	—	April 2, 2006	Kitt Peak	Spacewatch	BRG	1.3 km	MPC · JPL
610790	2006 GP_{16}	—	February 10, 2011	Catalina	CSS	·	2.9 km	MPC · JPL
610791	2006 GT_{16}	—	March 23, 2006	Kitt Peak	Spacewatch	·	1.5 km	MPC · JPL
610792	2006 GF_{20}	—	April 2, 2006	Kitt Peak	Spacewatch	·	620 m	MPC · JPL
610793	2006 GQ_{22}	—	April 2, 2006	Kitt Peak	Spacewatch	·	2.7 km	MPC · JPL
610794	2006 GB_{24}	—	April 2, 2006	Kitt Peak	Spacewatch	·	2.6 km	MPC · JPL
610795	2006 GM_{44}	—	April 2, 2006	Kitt Peak	Spacewatch	·	620 m	MPC · JPL
610796	2006 GJ_{54}	—	April 7, 2006	Kitt Peak	Spacewatch	·	2.3 km	MPC · JPL
610797	2006 GA_{56}	—	April 7, 2006	Kitt Peak	Spacewatch	·	610 m	MPC · JPL
610798	2006 GL_{56}	—	April 2, 2006	Kitt Peak	Spacewatch	·	2.2 km	MPC · JPL
610799	2006 GM_{56}	—	October 28, 1998	Kitt Peak	Spacewatch	THB	2.2 km	MPC · JPL
610800	2006 GU_{56}	—	January 30, 2011	Mount Lemmon	Mount Lemmon Survey	·	2.1 km	MPC · JPL

== 610801–610900 ==
back to top

Designation			Discovery			Properties		Ref
Permanent	Provisional	Named after	Date	Site	Discoverer(s)	Category	Diam.	Ref
610801	2006 GQ_{57}	—	April 2, 2006	Kitt Peak	Spacewatch	·	2.6 km	MPC · JPL
610802	2006 GR_{57}	—	April 17, 2013	Haleakala	Pan-STARRS 1	·	510 m	MPC · JPL
610803	2006 GU_{57}	—	April 9, 2006	Kitt Peak	Spacewatch	·	650 m	MPC · JPL
610804	2006 GY_{57}	—	January 17, 2016	Haleakala	Pan-STARRS 1	·	550 m	MPC · JPL
610805	2006 GB_{58}	—	April 30, 2015	Kitt Peak	Spacewatch	·	1.3 km	MPC · JPL
610806	2006 GG_{58}	—	October 29, 2017	Haleakala	Pan-STARRS 1	·	1.2 km	MPC · JPL
610807	2006 GP_{58}	—	September 18, 2014	Haleakala	Pan-STARRS 1	·	2.4 km	MPC · JPL
610808	2006 HQ_{5}	—	March 25, 2006	Kitt Peak	Spacewatch	·	1.7 km	MPC · JPL
610809	2006 HY_{9}	—	April 19, 2006	Kitt Peak	Spacewatch	·	1.2 km	MPC · JPL
610810	2006 HG_{11}	—	April 19, 2006	Kitt Peak	Spacewatch	·	3.1 km	MPC · JPL
610811	2006 HK_{32}	—	April 19, 2006	Palomar	NEAT	TIR	3.2 km	MPC · JPL
610812	2006 HL_{41}	—	April 21, 2006	Kitt Peak	Spacewatch	EUN	900 m	MPC · JPL
610813	2006 HP_{41}	—	April 21, 2006	Kitt Peak	Spacewatch	·	3.7 km	MPC · JPL
610814	2006 HD_{43}	—	April 24, 2006	Mount Lemmon	Mount Lemmon Survey	·	1.2 km	MPC · JPL
610815	2006 HB_{44}	—	April 24, 2006	Kitt Peak	Spacewatch	PHO	730 m	MPC · JPL
610816	2006 HG_{51}	—	April 24, 2006	Reedy Creek	J. Broughton	(883)	880 m	MPC · JPL
610817	2006 HM_{58}	—	April 30, 2006	Vallemare Borbona	V. S. Casulli	(5)	1.4 km	MPC · JPL
610818	2006 HU_{59}	—	October 20, 2003	Kitt Peak	Spacewatch	·	1.9 km	MPC · JPL
610819	2006 HD_{61}	—	April 22, 2006	Siding Spring	SSS	JUN	1.1 km	MPC · JPL
610820	2006 HC_{64}	—	April 8, 2006	Kitt Peak	Spacewatch	·	1.2 km	MPC · JPL
610821	2006 HW_{64}	—	April 24, 2006	Kitt Peak	Spacewatch	·	2.4 km	MPC · JPL
610822	2006 HF_{68}	—	April 24, 2006	Mount Lemmon	Mount Lemmon Survey	·	2.5 km	MPC · JPL
610823	2006 HL_{73}	—	April 25, 2006	Kitt Peak	Spacewatch	NEM	1.7 km	MPC · JPL
610824	2006 HC_{80}	—	March 5, 2006	Mount Lemmon	Mount Lemmon Survey	·	2.3 km	MPC · JPL
610825	2006 HP_{81}	—	April 26, 2006	Kitt Peak	Spacewatch	·	1.3 km	MPC · JPL
610826	2006 HX_{90}	—	April 29, 2006	Kitt Peak	Spacewatch	LIX	3.1 km	MPC · JPL
610827	2006 HP_{98}	—	April 26, 2006	Kitt Peak	Spacewatch	·	1.1 km	MPC · JPL
610828	2006 HT_{100}	—	April 30, 2006	Kitt Peak	Spacewatch	·	1.4 km	MPC · JPL
610829	2006 HQ_{101}	—	April 30, 2006	Kitt Peak	Spacewatch	·	3.2 km	MPC · JPL
610830	2006 HM_{103}	—	April 30, 2006	Kitt Peak	Spacewatch	·	2.8 km	MPC · JPL
610831	2006 HA_{105}	—	April 20, 2006	Catalina	CSS	·	2.7 km	MPC · JPL
610832	2006 HM_{106}	—	April 30, 2006	Kitt Peak	Spacewatch	·	570 m	MPC · JPL
610833	2006 HK_{109}	—	April 25, 2006	Kitt Peak	Spacewatch	·	490 m	MPC · JPL
610834	2006 HT_{114}	—	April 2, 2006	Kitt Peak	Spacewatch	·	2.4 km	MPC · JPL
610835	2006 HO_{116}	—	April 26, 2006	Kitt Peak	Spacewatch	·	560 m	MPC · JPL
610836	2006 HZ_{118}	—	April 30, 2006	Kitt Peak	Spacewatch	·	590 m	MPC · JPL
610837	2006 HA_{120}	—	April 2, 2006	Mount Lemmon	Mount Lemmon Survey	·	1.2 km	MPC · JPL
610838	2006 HK_{121}	—	April 30, 2006	Kitt Peak	Spacewatch	·	1.9 km	MPC · JPL
610839	2006 HP_{123}	—	April 24, 2006	Kitt Peak	Spacewatch	·	2.6 km	MPC · JPL
610840	2006 HT_{128}	—	April 26, 2006	Cerro Tololo	Deep Ecliptic Survey	THM	2.0 km	MPC · JPL
610841	2006 HU_{128}	—	January 26, 2006	Kitt Peak	Spacewatch	·	800 m	MPC · JPL
610842	2006 HX_{131}	—	April 26, 2006	Cerro Tololo	Deep Ecliptic Survey	·	2.2 km	MPC · JPL
610843	2006 HW_{133}	—	March 26, 2006	Mount Lemmon	Mount Lemmon Survey	·	2.5 km	MPC · JPL
610844	2006 HQ_{139}	—	April 26, 2006	Cerro Tololo	Deep Ecliptic Survey	·	820 m	MPC · JPL
610845	2006 HF_{140}	—	May 26, 2006	Mount Lemmon	Mount Lemmon Survey	·	670 m	MPC · JPL
610846	2006 HG_{141}	—	September 16, 2003	Kitt Peak	Spacewatch	·	2.3 km	MPC · JPL
610847	2006 HO_{143}	—	April 27, 2006	Cerro Tololo	Deep Ecliptic Survey	·	840 m	MPC · JPL
610848	2006 HD_{149}	—	May 9, 2006	Mount Lemmon	Mount Lemmon Survey	·	1.5 km	MPC · JPL
610849	2006 HA_{151}	—	April 30, 2006	Mauna Kea	D. J. Tholen, F. Bernardi	·	1.0 km	MPC · JPL
610850	2006 HQ_{151}	—	January 16, 2005	Kitt Peak	Spacewatch	·	1.4 km	MPC · JPL
610851	2006 HW_{154}	—	April 25, 2006	Mount Lemmon	Mount Lemmon Survey	THM	2.5 km	MPC · JPL
610852	2006 HJ_{155}	—	April 24, 2006	Anderson Mesa	LONEOS	PHO	700 m	MPC · JPL
610853	2006 HK_{155}	—	April 24, 2006	Kitt Peak	Spacewatch	EUN	980 m	MPC · JPL
610854	2006 HQ_{155}	—	April 24, 2006	Kitt Peak	Spacewatch	·	3.3 km	MPC · JPL
610855	2006 HR_{156}	—	August 28, 2009	Kitt Peak	Spacewatch	·	2.1 km	MPC · JPL
610856	2006 HZ_{156}	—	September 19, 2007	Dauban	Kugel, C. R. F.	·	1.5 km	MPC · JPL
610857	2006 HH_{157}	—	April 20, 2006	Kitt Peak	Spacewatch	·	1.2 km	MPC · JPL
610858	2006 HR_{158}	—	April 21, 2006	Kitt Peak	Spacewatch	·	910 m	MPC · JPL
610859	2006 HJ_{159}	—	November 14, 1998	Kitt Peak	Spacewatch	THM	2.1 km	MPC · JPL
610860	2006 HW_{159}	—	April 24, 2006	Kitt Peak	Spacewatch	·	500 m	MPC · JPL
610861	2006 JO_{8}	—	May 1, 2006	Kitt Peak	Spacewatch	TIR	2.1 km	MPC · JPL
610862	2006 JU_{9}	—	May 1, 2006	Kitt Peak	Spacewatch	·	1.1 km	MPC · JPL
610863	2006 JW_{9}	—	May 1, 2006	Kitt Peak	Spacewatch	EOS	1.8 km	MPC · JPL
610864	2006 JY_{10}	—	May 1, 2006	Kitt Peak	Spacewatch	·	3.2 km	MPC · JPL
610865	2006 JV_{11}	—	May 1, 2006	Kitt Peak	Spacewatch	·	2.0 km	MPC · JPL
610866	2006 JK_{12}	—	May 1, 2006	Kitt Peak	Spacewatch	·	3.0 km	MPC · JPL
610867	2006 JQ_{12}	—	May 1, 2006	Kitt Peak	Spacewatch	·	1.5 km	MPC · JPL
610868	2006 JV_{12}	—	May 1, 2006	Kitt Peak	Spacewatch	·	2.6 km	MPC · JPL
610869	2006 JF_{15}	—	April 19, 2006	Mount Lemmon	Mount Lemmon Survey	HNS	750 m	MPC · JPL
610870	2006 JU_{15}	—	May 2, 2006	Mount Lemmon	Mount Lemmon Survey	·	1.2 km	MPC · JPL
610871	2006 JK_{16}	—	April 24, 2006	Kitt Peak	Spacewatch	·	1.6 km	MPC · JPL
610872	2006 JC_{22}	—	April 20, 2006	Mount Lemmon	Mount Lemmon Survey	JUN	790 m	MPC · JPL
610873	2006 JL_{22}	—	May 2, 2006	Kitt Peak	Spacewatch	(1547)	1.4 km	MPC · JPL
610874	2006 JW_{24}	—	May 5, 2006	Anderson Mesa	LONEOS	·	3.6 km	MPC · JPL
610875	2006 JQ_{27}	—	April 19, 2006	Mount Lemmon	Mount Lemmon Survey	·	1.2 km	MPC · JPL
610876	2006 JV_{30}	—	April 25, 2006	Mount Lemmon	Mount Lemmon Survey	·	2.7 km	MPC · JPL
610877	2006 JY_{32}	—	April 25, 2006	Kitt Peak	Spacewatch	·	1.5 km	MPC · JPL
610878	2006 JE_{38}	—	May 6, 2006	Kitt Peak	Spacewatch	TIR	2.7 km	MPC · JPL
610879	2006 JT_{38}	—	May 6, 2006	Kitt Peak	Spacewatch	·	620 m	MPC · JPL
610880	2006 JS_{40}	—	April 25, 2006	Kitt Peak	Spacewatch	EUN	1.0 km	MPC · JPL
610881	2006 JM_{56}	—	May 5, 2006	Anderson Mesa	LONEOS	·	800 m	MPC · JPL
610882	2006 JO_{62}	—	January 26, 2006	Kitt Peak	Spacewatch	THM	2.2 km	MPC · JPL
610883	2006 JJ_{63}	—	February 2, 2006	Kitt Peak	Spacewatch	(5)	910 m	MPC · JPL
610884	2006 JS_{65}	—	May 1, 2006	Kitt Peak	Deep Ecliptic Survey	·	530 m	MPC · JPL
610885	2006 JS_{69}	—	May 6, 2006	Mount Lemmon	Mount Lemmon Survey	·	1.2 km	MPC · JPL
610886	2006 JA_{77}	—	May 1, 2006	Mauna Kea	P. A. Wiegert	·	2.5 km	MPC · JPL
610887	2006 JS_{81}	—	May 8, 2006	Kitt Peak	Spacewatch	(1118)	2.7 km	MPC · JPL
610888	2006 JY_{82}	—	January 2, 2012	Kitt Peak	Spacewatch	·	620 m	MPC · JPL
610889	2006 JZ_{82}	—	May 6, 2006	Mount Lemmon	Mount Lemmon Survey	·	680 m	MPC · JPL
610890	2006 JD_{83}	—	April 21, 2006	Kitt Peak	Spacewatch	·	3.3 km	MPC · JPL
610891	2006 JK_{83}	—	October 20, 2007	Mount Lemmon	Mount Lemmon Survey	·	1.6 km	MPC · JPL
610892	2006 JQ_{83}	—	November 15, 1995	Kitt Peak	Spacewatch	·	1.4 km	MPC · JPL
610893	2006 JH_{84}	—	October 1, 2014	Kitt Peak	Spacewatch	·	2.5 km	MPC · JPL
610894	2006 JC_{87}	—	October 27, 2016	Kitt Peak	Spacewatch	·	1.5 km	MPC · JPL
610895	2006 JE_{87}	—	May 4, 2006	Mount Lemmon	Mount Lemmon Survey	·	580 m	MPC · JPL
610896	2006 JN_{87}	—	January 20, 2009	Kitt Peak	Spacewatch	·	520 m	MPC · JPL
610897	2006 JQ_{87}	—	May 8, 2006	Kitt Peak	Spacewatch	·	1.4 km	MPC · JPL
610898	2006 KX_{3}	—	May 6, 2006	Mount Lemmon	Mount Lemmon Survey	EUN	1.2 km	MPC · JPL
610899	2006 KR_{4}	—	May 19, 2006	Mount Lemmon	Mount Lemmon Survey	·	580 m	MPC · JPL
610900	2006 KU_{6}	—	May 19, 2006	Mount Lemmon	Mount Lemmon Survey	·	1.5 km	MPC · JPL

== 610901–611000 ==
back to top

Designation			Discovery			Properties		Ref
Permanent	Provisional	Named after	Date	Site	Discoverer(s)	Category	Diam.	Ref
610901	2006 KF_{7}	—	May 19, 2006	Mount Lemmon	Mount Lemmon Survey	EUN	1.3 km	MPC · JPL
610902	2006 KC_{13}	—	May 20, 2006	Kitt Peak	Spacewatch	·	1.2 km	MPC · JPL
610903	2006 KH_{22}	—	May 20, 2006	Kitt Peak	Spacewatch	EUP	2.6 km	MPC · JPL
610904	2006 KQ_{26}	—	May 20, 2006	Kitt Peak	Spacewatch	·	3.0 km	MPC · JPL
610905	2006 KW_{28}	—	May 20, 2006	Kitt Peak	Spacewatch	·	1.7 km	MPC · JPL
610906	2006 KT_{32}	—	May 20, 2006	Kitt Peak	Spacewatch	·	990 m	MPC · JPL
610907	2006 KP_{36}	—	May 21, 2006	Kitt Peak	Spacewatch	·	2.5 km	MPC · JPL
610908	2006 KT_{50}	—	May 21, 2006	Kitt Peak	Spacewatch	·	1.2 km	MPC · JPL
610909	2006 KU_{50}	—	May 21, 2006	Kitt Peak	Spacewatch	EUN	940 m	MPC · JPL
610910	2006 KG_{59}	—	July 8, 2003	Palomar	NEAT	·	840 m	MPC · JPL
610911	2006 KK_{65}	—	May 24, 2006	Kitt Peak	Spacewatch	EUN	1.2 km	MPC · JPL
610912	2006 KV_{70}	—	May 5, 2006	Kitt Peak	Spacewatch	·	2.6 km	MPC · JPL
610913	2006 KP_{74}	—	May 23, 2006	Kitt Peak	Spacewatch	·	1.3 km	MPC · JPL
610914	2006 KF_{78}	—	May 24, 2006	Mount Lemmon	Mount Lemmon Survey	·	1.3 km	MPC · JPL
610915	2006 KO_{78}	—	May 7, 2006	Mount Lemmon	Mount Lemmon Survey	·	1.2 km	MPC · JPL
610916	2006 KP_{79}	—	May 25, 2006	Mount Lemmon	Mount Lemmon Survey	·	2.6 km	MPC · JPL
610917	2006 KG_{81}	—	May 25, 2006	Mount Lemmon	Mount Lemmon Survey	·	1.8 km	MPC · JPL
610918	2006 KL_{86}	—	December 6, 2000	Kitt Peak	Spacewatch	BAR	960 m	MPC · JPL
610919	2006 KY_{88}	—	May 26, 2006	Mount Lemmon	Mount Lemmon Survey	·	650 m	MPC · JPL
610920	2006 KS_{93}	—	May 6, 2006	Mount Lemmon	Mount Lemmon Survey	MAR	1.2 km	MPC · JPL
610921	2006 KO_{96}	—	May 25, 2006	Kitt Peak	Spacewatch	·	1.5 km	MPC · JPL
610922	2006 KE_{97}	—	May 25, 2006	Mount Lemmon	Mount Lemmon Survey	V	540 m	MPC · JPL
610923	2006 KT_{107}	—	October 1, 2003	Kitt Peak	Spacewatch	·	890 m	MPC · JPL
610924	2006 KB_{112}	—	May 23, 2006	Mount Lemmon	Mount Lemmon Survey	·	1.9 km	MPC · JPL
610925	2006 KM_{112}	—	May 31, 2006	Mount Lemmon	Mount Lemmon Survey	HNS	1.0 km	MPC · JPL
610926	2006 KS_{123}	—	May 21, 2006	Siding Spring	SSS	·	1.7 km	MPC · JPL
610927	2006 KG_{130}	—	May 25, 2006	Mauna Kea	P. A. Wiegert	(11882)	1.2 km	MPC · JPL
610928	2006 KQ_{134}	—	May 25, 2006	Mauna Kea	P. A. Wiegert	·	1.3 km	MPC · JPL
610929	2006 KE_{137}	—	May 23, 2006	Mount Lemmon	Mount Lemmon Survey	(2076)	660 m	MPC · JPL
610930	2006 KA_{138}	—	May 25, 2006	Mauna Kea	P. A. Wiegert	·	1.1 km	MPC · JPL
610931	2006 KS_{138}	—	May 25, 2006	Mauna Kea	P. A. Wiegert	·	1.2 km	MPC · JPL
610932	2006 KZ_{142}	—	May 25, 2006	Mauna Kea	P. A. Wiegert	·	1 km	MPC · JPL
610933	2006 KJ_{143}	—	May 6, 2006	Mount Lemmon	Mount Lemmon Survey	·	610 m	MPC · JPL
610934	2006 KH_{146}	—	May 25, 2006	Kitt Peak	Spacewatch	·	620 m	MPC · JPL
610935	2006 KS_{146}	—	May 22, 2006	Kitt Peak	Spacewatch	·	1.0 km	MPC · JPL
610936	2006 KZ_{146}	—	August 10, 2016	Haleakala	Pan-STARRS 1	ADE	1.7 km	MPC · JPL
610937	2006 KA_{147}	—	May 21, 2006	Kitt Peak	Spacewatch	·	1.4 km	MPC · JPL
610938	2006 KK_{147}	—	October 7, 2016	Mount Lemmon	Mount Lemmon Survey	·	1.6 km	MPC · JPL
610939	2006 KB_{148}	—	October 21, 2008	Kitt Peak	Spacewatch	EUN	900 m	MPC · JPL
610940	2006 KC_{148}	—	May 22, 2006	Kitt Peak	Spacewatch	·	2.7 km	MPC · JPL
610941	2006 KG_{148}	—	October 20, 2008	Kitt Peak	Spacewatch	·	2.6 km	MPC · JPL
610942	2006 KL_{148}	—	April 9, 2016	Haleakala	Pan-STARRS 1	·	600 m	MPC · JPL
610943	2006 KM_{149}	—	May 20, 2006	Kitt Peak	Spacewatch	·	1.5 km	MPC · JPL
610944	2006 KA_{150}	—	July 6, 2015	Haleakala	Pan-STARRS 1	MAR	910 m	MPC · JPL
610945	2006 KE_{152}	—	November 22, 2012	Kitt Peak	Spacewatch	EUN	1.2 km	MPC · JPL
610946	2006 KZ_{152}	—	May 19, 2006	Mount Lemmon	Mount Lemmon Survey	·	2.4 km	MPC · JPL
610947	2006 KP_{153}	—	November 6, 2016	Mount Lemmon	Mount Lemmon Survey	·	2.6 km	MPC · JPL
610948	2006 KL_{154}	—	May 24, 2006	Kitt Peak	Spacewatch	(45637)	3.1 km	MPC · JPL
610949	2006 KJ_{155}	—	May 26, 2006	Kitt Peak	Spacewatch	·	1.4 km	MPC · JPL
610950	2006 KN_{155}	—	May 19, 2006	Mount Lemmon	Mount Lemmon Survey	·	1.1 km	MPC · JPL
610951	2006 KW_{155}	—	July 28, 2011	Haleakala	Pan-STARRS 1	·	1.1 km	MPC · JPL
610952	2006 LM_{8}	—	November 25, 2014	Haleakala	Pan-STARRS 1	·	3.1 km	MPC · JPL
610953	2006 LN_{8}	—	October 9, 2012	Mount Lemmon	Mount Lemmon Survey	·	1.8 km	MPC · JPL
610954	2006 LU_{8}	—	December 14, 2017	Mount Lemmon	Mount Lemmon Survey	HNS	1.1 km	MPC · JPL
610955	2006 MK	—	May 27, 2006	Catalina	CSS	MAR	1.1 km	MPC · JPL
610956	2006 MQ	—	June 16, 2006	Kitt Peak	Spacewatch	·	1.4 km	MPC · JPL
610957	2006 MX	—	June 16, 2006	Kitt Peak	Spacewatch	·	3.1 km	MPC · JPL
610958	2006 ML_{5}	—	June 5, 2006	Kitt Peak	Spacewatch	EUN	780 m	MPC · JPL
610959	2006 MO_{11}	—	June 21, 2006	Kitt Peak	Spacewatch	PHO	860 m	MPC · JPL
610960	2006 MA_{12}	—	May 7, 2006	Kitt Peak	Spacewatch	·	2.0 km	MPC · JPL
610961	2006 MN_{15}	—	January 31, 2009	Mount Lemmon	Mount Lemmon Survey	·	2.0 km	MPC · JPL
610962	2006 MO_{15}	—	December 31, 2008	Kitt Peak	Spacewatch	·	3.7 km	MPC · JPL
610963	2006 MS_{15}	—	November 21, 2009	Mount Lemmon	Mount Lemmon Survey	·	3.5 km	MPC · JPL
610964	2006 MD_{16}	—	June 20, 2006	Mount Lemmon	Mount Lemmon Survey	GEF	1.1 km	MPC · JPL
610965	2006 ME_{16}	—	November 13, 2012	Mount Lemmon	Mount Lemmon Survey	·	1.7 km	MPC · JPL
610966	2006 MU_{16}	—	February 12, 2016	Mount Lemmon	Mount Lemmon Survey	·	700 m	MPC · JPL
610967	2006 MW_{16}	—	June 20, 2006	Mount Lemmon	Mount Lemmon Survey	·	720 m	MPC · JPL
610968	2006 OA_{4}	—	July 21, 2006	Mount Lemmon	Mount Lemmon Survey	·	1.4 km	MPC · JPL
610969	2006 OQ_{8}	—	July 21, 2006	Mount Lemmon	Mount Lemmon Survey	PHO	980 m	MPC · JPL
610970	2006 OJ_{18}	—	April 10, 2005	Kitt Peak	Deep Ecliptic Survey	·	990 m	MPC · JPL
610971	2006 OU_{21}	—	September 4, 2011	Haleakala	Pan-STARRS 1	HOF	1.8 km	MPC · JPL
610972	2006 OW_{23}	—	July 19, 2006	Mauna Kea	P. A. Wiegert, D. Subasinghe	·	1.4 km	MPC · JPL
610973	2006 OG_{24}	—	December 17, 2003	Kitt Peak	Spacewatch	·	2.9 km	MPC · JPL
610974	2006 OG_{25}	—	July 21, 2006	Mount Lemmon	Mount Lemmon Survey	DOR	2.0 km	MPC · JPL
610975	2006 OP_{25}	—	July 19, 2006	Mauna Kea	P. A. Wiegert, D. Subasinghe	L4	5.9 km	MPC · JPL
610976	2006 OA_{32}	—	June 3, 2006	Mount Lemmon	Mount Lemmon Survey	·	2.0 km	MPC · JPL
610977	2006 OU_{34}	—	July 21, 2006	Mount Lemmon	Mount Lemmon Survey	·	1.3 km	MPC · JPL
610978	2006 OO_{38}	—	December 18, 2007	Kitt Peak	Spacewatch	HOF	2.2 km	MPC · JPL
610979	2006 OU_{38}	—	July 25, 2006	Mount Lemmon	Mount Lemmon Survey	ERI	870 m	MPC · JPL
610980	2006 OD_{40}	—	September 8, 2011	Kitt Peak	Spacewatch	·	1.4 km	MPC · JPL
610981	2006 PL	—	July 21, 2006	Mount Lemmon	Mount Lemmon Survey	·	1.7 km	MPC · JPL
610982	2006 PQ	—	August 6, 2006	Pla D'Arguines	R. Ferrando, Ferrando, M.	·	2.1 km	MPC · JPL
610983	2006 PH_{2}	—	May 30, 2006	Mount Lemmon	Mount Lemmon Survey	·	950 m	MPC · JPL
610984	2006 PO_{10}	—	August 13, 2006	Palomar	NEAT	·	790 m	MPC · JPL
610985	2006 PP_{25}	—	August 13, 2006	Palomar	NEAT	·	770 m	MPC · JPL
610986	2006 PX_{28}	—	August 15, 2006	Siding Spring	SSS	PHO	850 m	MPC · JPL
610987	2006 PZ_{30}	—	August 13, 2006	Palomar	NEAT	·	2.9 km	MPC · JPL
610988	2006 PU_{33}	—	May 26, 2006	Mount Lemmon	Mount Lemmon Survey	GEF	1.3 km	MPC · JPL
610989	2006 PW_{40}	—	August 15, 2006	Palomar	NEAT	·	2.4 km	MPC · JPL
610990	2006 PB_{41}	—	June 19, 2006	Mount Lemmon	Mount Lemmon Survey	·	790 m	MPC · JPL
610991	2006 PJ_{41}	—	August 18, 2006	Palomar	NEAT	·	800 m	MPC · JPL
610992	2006 QZ	—	August 17, 2006	Piszkés-tető	K. Sárneczky	·	790 m	MPC · JPL
610993	2006 QN_{8}	—	August 19, 2006	Kitt Peak	Spacewatch	·	680 m	MPC · JPL
610994	2006 QA_{10}	—	August 20, 2006	Kitt Peak	Spacewatch	·	1.5 km	MPC · JPL
610995	2006 QW_{13}	—	August 17, 2006	Palomar	NEAT	·	840 m	MPC · JPL
610996	2006 QD_{15}	—	August 13, 2006	Palomar	NEAT	·	1.1 km	MPC · JPL
610997	2006 QJ_{22}	—	August 19, 2006	Anderson Mesa	LONEOS	·	1.0 km	MPC · JPL
610998	2006 QF_{29}	—	August 21, 2006	Palomar	NEAT	NYS	810 m	MPC · JPL
610999	2006 QF_{30}	—	August 20, 2006	Palomar	NEAT	(2076)	1.1 km	MPC · JPL
611000	2006 QX_{33}	—	August 23, 2006	Marly	P. Kocher	·	2.6 km	MPC · JPL

back to top
