= List of minor planets: 815001–816000 =

The following is a partial list of minor planets, running from minor-planet number 815001 through 816000, inclusive. The primary data for this and other partial lists is based on JPL's "Small-Body Orbital Elements" and data available from the Minor Planet Center. Critical list information is also provided by the MPC, unless otherwise specified from Lowell Observatory. A detailed description of the table's columns and additional sources are given on the main page including a complete list of every page in this series, and a statistical break-up on the dynamical classification of minor planets.

Also see the summary list of all named bodies in numerical and alphabetical order, and the corresponding naming citations for the number range of this particular list. New namings may only be added to this list after official publication, as the preannouncement of names is condemned by the Working Group for Small Bodies Nomenclature of the International Astronomical Union.

Near-Earth obj.	MBA (inner)	MBA (outer)	Centaur
Mars-crosser	MBA (middle)	Jupiter trojan	Trans-Neptunian obj.
Unclassified

== 815001–815100 ==
Designation			Discovery			Properties		Ref
Permanent	Provisional	Named after	Date	Site	Discoverer(s)	Category	Diam.	Ref
815001	2009 HF_{115}	—	May 5, 2013	Haleakala	Pan-STARRS 1	·	850 m	MPC; JPL
815002	2009 HD_{116}	—	April 19, 2009	Mount Lemmon	Mount Lemmon Survey	·	1.2 km	MPC; JPL
815003	2009 HC_{117}	—	August 2, 2016	Haleakala	Pan-STARRS 1	·	530 m	MPC; JPL
815004	2009 HG_{117}	—	January 28, 2017	Haleakala	Pan-STARRS 1	H	400 m	MPC; JPL
815005	2009 HF_{120}	—	April 28, 2009	Kitt Peak	Spacewatch	DOR	1.7 km	MPC; JPL
815006	2009 HU_{120}	—	January 31, 2016	Haleakala	Pan-STARRS 1	3:2	3.8 km	MPC; JPL
815007	2009 HE_{121}	—	April 22, 2009	Kitt Peak	Spacewatch	·	1.8 km	MPC; JPL
815008	2009 HM_{122}	—	October 20, 2003	Kitt Peak	Spacewatch	·	490 m	MPC; JPL
815009	2009 HA_{124}	—	April 18, 2009	Mount Lemmon	Mount Lemmon Survey	·	570 m	MPC; JPL
815010	2009 HJ_{127}	—	April 29, 2009	Kitt Peak	Spacewatch	H	350 m	MPC; JPL
815011	2009 HW_{129}	—	April 7, 2005	Kitt Peak	Spacewatch	·	1.0 km	MPC; JPL
815012	2009 HL_{130}	—	November 27, 2017	Mount Lemmon	Mount Lemmon Survey	·	1.3 km	MPC; JPL
815013	2009 JQ_{5}	—	August 18, 2006	Palomar	NEAT	·	430 m	MPC; JPL
815014	2009 JR_{7}	—	April 23, 2009	Mount Lemmon	Mount Lemmon Survey	·	1.8 km	MPC; JPL
815015	2009 JS_{8}	—	April 20, 2009	Kitt Peak	Spacewatch	·	440 m	MPC; JPL
815016	2009 JN_{16}	—	May 15, 2009	Kitt Peak	Spacewatch	·	410 m	MPC; JPL
815017	2009 JT_{20}	—	July 12, 2016	Mount Lemmon	Mount Lemmon Survey	·	480 m	MPC; JPL
815018	2009 JD_{21}	—	May 4, 2009	Mount Lemmon	Mount Lemmon Survey	·	530 m	MPC; JPL
815019	2009 JE_{21}	—	September 1, 2014	Catalina	CSS	·	1.4 km	MPC; JPL
815020	2009 KA_{1}	—	November 3, 2007	Mount Lemmon	Mount Lemmon Survey	PHO	780 m	MPC; JPL
815021	2009 KF_{7}	—	May 22, 2009	Hibiscus	Teamo, N.	·	520 m	MPC; JPL
815022	2009 KK_{11}	—	April 18, 2009	Mount Lemmon	Mount Lemmon Survey	·	770 m	MPC; JPL
815023	2009 KC_{12}	—	May 25, 2009	Kitt Peak	Spacewatch	V	430 m	MPC; JPL
815024	2009 KB_{15}	—	April 19, 2009	Kitt Peak	Spacewatch	·	600 m	MPC; JPL
815025	2009 KS_{21}	—	May 4, 2009	XuYi	PMO NEO Survey Program	·	1.2 km	MPC; JPL
815026	2009 KM_{23}	—	May 16, 2009	Kitt Peak	Spacewatch	·	1.9 km	MPC; JPL
815027	2009 KQ_{23}	—	April 20, 2009	Mount Lemmon	Mount Lemmon Survey	H	430 m	MPC; JPL
815028	2009 KG_{24}	—	April 23, 2009	Kitt Peak	Spacewatch	·	1.7 km	MPC; JPL
815029	2009 KM_{35}	—	January 15, 2008	Mount Lemmon	Mount Lemmon Survey	·	600 m	MPC; JPL
815030	2009 KF_{36}	—	May 28, 2009	Mount Lemmon	Mount Lemmon Survey	ERI	1.1 km	MPC; JPL
815031	2009 KA_{39}	—	December 14, 2010	Mount Lemmon	Mount Lemmon Survey	·	580 m	MPC; JPL
815032	2009 KJ_{39}	—	December 27, 2011	Mount Lemmon	Mount Lemmon Survey	·	880 m	MPC; JPL
815033	2009 KC_{40}	—	May 17, 2013	Mount Lemmon	Mount Lemmon Survey	·	770 m	MPC; JPL
815034	2009 KF_{40}	—	June 8, 2013	Mount Lemmon	Mount Lemmon Survey	·	660 m	MPC; JPL
815035	2009 KG_{40}	—	February 28, 2012	Haleakala	Pan-STARRS 1	·	520 m	MPC; JPL
815036	2009 KL_{42}	—	June 20, 2013	Mount Lemmon	Mount Lemmon Survey	·	760 m	MPC; JPL
815037	2009 KN_{43}	—	May 16, 2009	Mount Lemmon	Mount Lemmon Survey	·	2.5 km	MPC; JPL
815038	2009 LR_{7}	—	June 3, 2009	Mount Lemmon	Mount Lemmon Survey	·	1.1 km	MPC; JPL
815039	2009 LW_{7}	—	January 12, 2014	Mount Lemmon	Mount Lemmon Survey	H	380 m	MPC; JPL
815040	2009 LC_{8}	—	June 1, 2009	Mount Lemmon	Mount Lemmon Survey	·	1.7 km	MPC; JPL
815041	2009 LF_{8}	—	June 15, 2009	Mount Lemmon	Mount Lemmon Survey	·	430 m	MPC; JPL
815042	2009 ME_{4}	—	June 19, 2009	Kitt Peak	Spacewatch	H	430 m	MPC; JPL
815043	2009 ME_{11}	—	February 16, 2015	Haleakala	Pan-STARRS 1	PHO	860 m	MPC; JPL
815044	2009 MF_{11}	—	May 31, 2012	Mount Lemmon	Mount Lemmon Survey	·	520 m	MPC; JPL
815045	2009 MK_{12}	—	March 12, 2013	Kitt Peak	Spacewatch	·	1.3 km	MPC; JPL
815046	2009 MP_{12}	—	June 23, 2009	Mount Lemmon	Mount Lemmon Survey	·	2.1 km	MPC; JPL
815047	2009 OU_{5}	—	May 28, 2009	Mount Lemmon	Mount Lemmon Survey	·	2.9 km	MPC; JPL
815048	2009 OM_{9}	—	July 29, 2009	Catalina	CSS	·	860 m	MPC; JPL
815049	2009 OG_{12}	—	July 27, 2009	Kitt Peak	Spacewatch	·	990 m	MPC; JPL
815050	2009 OB_{14}	—	July 27, 2009	Kitt Peak	Spacewatch	·	1.7 km	MPC; JPL
815051	2009 OF_{17}	—	November 4, 2004	Kitt Peak	Spacewatch	LIX	2.3 km	MPC; JPL
815052	2009 OT_{19}	—	July 29, 2009	Cerro Burek	I. de la Cueva	·	480 m	MPC; JPL
815053	2009 OW_{23}	—	July 28, 2009	Kitt Peak	Spacewatch	NYS	890 m	MPC; JPL
815054	2009 OZ_{26}	—	July 28, 2009	Kitt Peak	Spacewatch	·	590 m	MPC; JPL
815055	2009 OA_{27}	—	July 28, 2009	Kitt Peak	Spacewatch	·	680 m	MPC; JPL
815056	2009 OJ_{27}	—	July 30, 2009	Kitt Peak	Spacewatch	·	470 m	MPC; JPL
815057	2009 OK_{28}	—	July 31, 2009	Kitt Peak	Spacewatch	·	2.4 km	MPC; JPL
815058	2009 OR_{29}	—	July 29, 2009	Kitt Peak	Spacewatch	·	2.5 km	MPC; JPL
815059	2009 OB_{30}	—	July 28, 2009	Kitt Peak	Spacewatch	·	730 m	MPC; JPL
815060	2009 OG_{30}	—	July 31, 2009	Catalina	CSS	·	1.4 km	MPC; JPL
815061	2009 PG_{4}	—	July 29, 2009	Kitt Peak	Spacewatch	·	2.1 km	MPC; JPL
815062	2009 PQ_{7}	—	July 28, 2009	Kitt Peak	Spacewatch	·	550 m	MPC; JPL
815063	2009 PE_{10}	—	October 3, 2005	Palomar	NEAT	·	1.2 km	MPC; JPL
815064	2009 PU_{20}	—	August 6, 2005	Palomar	NEAT	·	930 m	MPC; JPL
815065	2009 PO_{22}	—	August 15, 2009	Kitt Peak	Spacewatch	·	700 m	MPC; JPL
815066	2009 PB_{23}	—	March 5, 2011	Mount Lemmon	Mount Lemmon Survey	H	440 m	MPC; JPL
815067	2009 PJ_{23}	—	August 15, 2009	Kitt Peak	Spacewatch	NYS	950 m	MPC; JPL
815068	2009 QF_{1}	—	August 16, 2009	La Sagra	OAM	NYS	800 m	MPC; JPL
815069	2009 QN_{9}	—	August 1, 2009	Kitt Peak	Spacewatch	·	1.8 km	MPC; JPL
815070	2009 QD_{12}	—	August 16, 2009	Kitt Peak	Spacewatch	·	600 m	MPC; JPL
815071	2009 QM_{20}	—	June 23, 2009	Mount Lemmon	Mount Lemmon Survey	·	650 m	MPC; JPL
815072	2009 QQ_{20}	—	August 19, 2009	Kitt Peak	Spacewatch	PHO	840 m	MPC; JPL
815073	2009 QM_{25}	—	July 27, 2009	Kitt Peak	Spacewatch	(2076)	730 m	MPC; JPL
815074	2009 QB_{26}	—	July 27, 2009	Catalina	CSS	·	810 m	MPC; JPL
815075	2009 QX_{26}	—	August 22, 2009	Dauban	C. Rinner, Kugel, F.	·	2.9 km	MPC; JPL
815076	2009 QY_{27}	—	July 28, 2009	Kitt Peak	Spacewatch	NYS	1.1 km	MPC; JPL
815077	2009 QB_{29}	—	August 18, 2009	Bergisch Gladbach	W. Bickel	·	510 m	MPC; JPL
815078	2009 QF_{29}	—	August 19, 2009	Bergisch Gladbach	W. Bickel	·	610 m	MPC; JPL
815079	2009 QG_{38}	—	August 29, 2009	Bergisch Gladbach	W. Bickel	·	680 m	MPC; JPL
815080	2009 QG_{40}	—	August 15, 2009	Kitt Peak	Spacewatch	NYS	790 m	MPC; JPL
815081	2009 QX_{40}	—	October 21, 2006	Kitt Peak	Spacewatch	·	460 m	MPC; JPL
815082	2009 QW_{46}	—	August 27, 2009	La Sagra	OAM	·	1.5 km	MPC; JPL
815083	2009 QF_{52}	—	August 16, 2009	Kitt Peak	Spacewatch	·	850 m	MPC; JPL
815084	2009 QD_{60}	—	August 16, 2009	Kitt Peak	Spacewatch	·	610 m	MPC; JPL
815085	2009 QP_{63}	—	August 16, 2009	Catalina	CSS	·	2.2 km	MPC; JPL
815086	2009 QM_{69}	—	August 2, 2009	Siding Spring	SSS	·	1.7 km	MPC; JPL
815087	2009 QO_{69}	—	August 18, 2009	Kitt Peak	Spacewatch	·	1.2 km	MPC; JPL
815088	2009 QJ_{72}	—	August 16, 2009	Kitt Peak	Spacewatch	V	450 m	MPC; JPL
815089	2009 QW_{73}	—	August 28, 2009	Kitt Peak	Spacewatch	NYS	830 m	MPC; JPL
815090	2009 QZ_{73}	—	August 26, 2009	Catalina	CSS	·	900 m	MPC; JPL
815091	2009 QK_{74}	—	August 27, 2009	Catalina	CSS	·	1.9 km	MPC; JPL
815092	2009 QL_{75}	—	August 17, 2009	Kitt Peak	Spacewatch	ARM	2.5 km	MPC; JPL
815093	2009 QX_{75}	—	August 27, 2009	Kitt Peak	Spacewatch	MAS	530 m	MPC; JPL
815094	2009 QU_{76}	—	August 18, 2009	Kitt Peak	Spacewatch	NYS	800 m	MPC; JPL
815095	2009 QR_{77}	—	August 27, 2009	Kitt Peak	Spacewatch	·	570 m	MPC; JPL
815096	2009 QY_{77}	—	August 20, 2009	Siding Spring	SSS	·	1.4 km	MPC; JPL
815097	2009 QO_{83}	—	August 27, 2009	Kitt Peak	Spacewatch	·	1.1 km	MPC; JPL
815098	2009 RW	—	September 10, 2009	ESA OGS	ESA OGS	·	660 m	MPC; JPL
815099	2009 RS_{4}	—	September 12, 2009	ESA OGS	ESA OGS	·	820 m	MPC; JPL
815100	2009 RR_{28}	—	September 14, 2009	Kitt Peak	Spacewatch	·	1.1 km	MPC; JPL

== 815101–815200 ==
back to top

Designation			Discovery			Properties		Ref
Permanent	Provisional	Named after	Date	Site	Discoverer(s)	Category	Diam.	Ref
815101	2009 RH_{33}	—	September 14, 2009	Kitt Peak	Spacewatch	·	1.5 km	MPC; JPL
815102	2009 RK_{35}	—	September 14, 2009	Kitt Peak	Spacewatch	·	630 m	MPC; JPL
815103	2009 RV_{39}	—	September 15, 2009	Kitt Peak	Spacewatch	·	840 m	MPC; JPL
815104	2009 RW_{48}	—	September 15, 2009	Kitt Peak	Spacewatch	·	860 m	MPC; JPL
815105	2009 RA_{52}	—	September 15, 2009	Kitt Peak	Spacewatch	·	510 m	MPC; JPL
815106	2009 RG_{65}	—	September 15, 2009	Kitt Peak	Spacewatch	·	700 m	MPC; JPL
815107	2009 RH_{70}	—	September 12, 2009	Kitt Peak	Spacewatch	·	500 m	MPC; JPL
815108	2009 RR_{72}	—	September 15, 2009	Kitt Peak	Spacewatch	·	2.4 km	MPC; JPL
815109	2009 RY_{72}	—	September 15, 2009	Kitt Peak	Spacewatch	MAS	520 m	MPC; JPL
815110	2009 RP_{77}	—	September 15, 2009	Kitt Peak	Spacewatch	EUN	820 m	MPC; JPL
815111	2009 RR_{78}	—	September 15, 2009	Mount Lemmon	Mount Lemmon Survey	·	480 m	MPC; JPL
815112	2009 RY_{79}	—	September 15, 2009	Kitt Peak	Spacewatch	·	530 m	MPC; JPL
815113	2009 RQ_{80}	—	September 15, 2009	Kitt Peak	Spacewatch	·	420 m	MPC; JPL
815114	2009 RQ_{81}	—	September 15, 2009	Kitt Peak	Spacewatch	MAS	480 m	MPC; JPL
815115	2009 RF_{84}	—	September 14, 2009	Kitt Peak	Spacewatch	·	770 m	MPC; JPL
815116	2009 SW_{9}	—	September 16, 2009	Mount Lemmon	Mount Lemmon Survey	T_{j} (2.94) · 3:2	4.8 km	MPC; JPL
815117	2009 SN_{14}	—	September 10, 2009	Catalina	CSS	·	800 m	MPC; JPL
815118	2009 SM_{21}	—	September 21, 2009	Bergisch Gladbach	W. Bickel	·	1.5 km	MPC; JPL
815119	2009 SP_{24}	—	August 17, 2009	Kitt Peak	Spacewatch	·	720 m	MPC; JPL
815120	2009 SF_{35}	—	September 16, 2009	Kitt Peak	Spacewatch	·	810 m	MPC; JPL
815121	2009 SU_{48}	—	September 16, 2009	Kitt Peak	Spacewatch	·	1.1 km	MPC; JPL
815122	2009 SW_{63}	—	September 17, 2009	Mount Lemmon	Mount Lemmon Survey	·	990 m	MPC; JPL
815123	2009 ST_{64}	—	September 29, 2005	Kitt Peak	Spacewatch	·	940 m	MPC; JPL
815124	2009 SZ_{64}	—	September 13, 1998	Kitt Peak	Spacewatch	·	2.0 km	MPC; JPL
815125	2009 SE_{66}	—	September 17, 2009	Kitt Peak	Spacewatch	·	580 m	MPC; JPL
815126	2009 SS_{67}	—	September 17, 2009	Kitt Peak	Spacewatch	H	320 m	MPC; JPL
815127	2009 SY_{70}	—	September 17, 2009	Kitt Peak	Spacewatch	·	1.2 km	MPC; JPL
815128	2009 SZ_{77}	—	July 29, 2009	Kitt Peak	Spacewatch	·	770 m	MPC; JPL
815129	2009 SZ_{80}	—	August 15, 2009	Kitt Peak	Spacewatch	·	2.2 km	MPC; JPL
815130	2009 SN_{89}	—	September 25, 2005	Kitt Peak	Spacewatch	(5)	740 m	MPC; JPL
815131	2009 SN_{91}	—	August 27, 2009	Kitt Peak	Spacewatch	·	930 m	MPC; JPL
815132	2009 SN_{92}	—	September 18, 2009	Mount Lemmon	Mount Lemmon Survey	·	860 m	MPC; JPL
815133	2009 SA_{99}	—	September 17, 2009	Mount Lemmon	Mount Lemmon Survey	·	1.9 km	MPC; JPL
815134	2009 SJ_{100}	—	August 17, 2009	Kitt Peak	Spacewatch	·	760 m	MPC; JPL
815135	2009 SY_{101}	—	September 17, 2009	Mount Lemmon	Mount Lemmon Survey	·	590 m	MPC; JPL
815136	2009 SF_{105}	—	September 16, 2009	Kitt Peak	Spacewatch	·	1.1 km	MPC; JPL
815137	2009 SJ_{112}	—	September 18, 2009	Kitt Peak	Spacewatch	·	550 m	MPC; JPL
815138	2009 SU_{112}	—	September 18, 2009	Kitt Peak	Spacewatch	·	820 m	MPC; JPL
815139	2009 SB_{113}	—	September 18, 2009	Kitt Peak	Spacewatch	·	1.1 km	MPC; JPL
815140	2009 SH_{113}	—	September 18, 2009	Kitt Peak	Spacewatch	·	1.8 km	MPC; JPL
815141	2009 SD_{126}	—	September 18, 2009	Kitt Peak	Spacewatch	·	810 m	MPC; JPL
815142	2009 SG_{131}	—	September 18, 2009	Kitt Peak	Spacewatch	·	2.5 km	MPC; JPL
815143	2009 SF_{134}	—	September 18, 2009	Kitt Peak	Spacewatch	·	520 m	MPC; JPL
815144	2009 SJ_{141}	—	September 19, 2009	Kitt Peak	Spacewatch	HYG	2.2 km	MPC; JPL
815145	2009 SB_{148}	—	October 28, 2005	Mount Lemmon	Mount Lemmon Survey	·	1.0 km	MPC; JPL
815146	2009 SG_{149}	—	September 20, 2009	Kitt Peak	Spacewatch	KON	1.6 km	MPC; JPL
815147	2009 ST_{156}	—	September 16, 2009	Kitt Peak	Spacewatch	·	3.1 km	MPC; JPL
815148	2009 SW_{157}	—	September 20, 2009	Mount Lemmon	Mount Lemmon Survey	·	1.9 km	MPC; JPL
815149	2009 SO_{161}	—	August 14, 2009	Charleston	R. Holmes, H. Devore	JUN	950 m	MPC; JPL
815150	2009 SN_{166}	—	September 22, 2009	Mount Lemmon	Mount Lemmon Survey	·	1.1 km	MPC; JPL
815151	2009 SM_{171}	—	August 29, 2009	Kitt Peak	Spacewatch	·	1.9 km	MPC; JPL
815152	2009 ST_{176}	—	September 19, 2009	Mount Lemmon	Mount Lemmon Survey	EUN	890 m	MPC; JPL
815153	2009 SN_{177}	—	September 20, 2009	Kitt Peak	Spacewatch	NYS	750 m	MPC; JPL
815154	2009 SK_{178}	—	August 17, 2009	Kitt Peak	Spacewatch	·	880 m	MPC; JPL
815155	2009 SP_{178}	—	September 1, 2005	Kitt Peak	Spacewatch	·	620 m	MPC; JPL
815156	2009 SS_{178}	—	August 18, 2009	Kitt Peak	Spacewatch	·	750 m	MPC; JPL
815157	2009 SX_{181}	—	September 21, 2009	Mount Lemmon	Mount Lemmon Survey	·	810 m	MPC; JPL
815158	2009 SZ_{187}	—	September 21, 2009	Kitt Peak	Spacewatch	·	550 m	MPC; JPL
815159	2009 SK_{199}	—	September 22, 2009	Kitt Peak	Spacewatch	·	1.8 km	MPC; JPL
815160	2009 SG_{205}	—	September 18, 2009	Kitt Peak	Spacewatch	·	540 m	MPC; JPL
815161	2009 SL_{205}	—	September 22, 2009	Kitt Peak	Spacewatch	·	1.7 km	MPC; JPL
815162	2009 SQ_{206}	—	November 6, 2005	Mount Lemmon	Mount Lemmon Survey	·	980 m	MPC; JPL
815163	2009 SR_{206}	—	September 18, 2009	Kitt Peak	Spacewatch	·	460 m	MPC; JPL
815164	2009 SF_{209}	—	September 23, 2009	Kitt Peak	Spacewatch	·	1.8 km	MPC; JPL
815165	2009 SJ_{209}	—	September 23, 2009	Kitt Peak	Spacewatch	NYS	670 m	MPC; JPL
815166	2009 SA_{220}	—	September 24, 2009	Mount Lemmon	Mount Lemmon Survey	·	640 m	MPC; JPL
815167	2009 SD_{222}	—	September 25, 2009	Mount Lemmon	Mount Lemmon Survey	·	550 m	MPC; JPL
815168	2009 SR_{226}	—	September 26, 2009	Mount Lemmon	Mount Lemmon Survey	·	570 m	MPC; JPL
815169	2009 SL_{227}	—	September 26, 2009	Mount Lemmon	Mount Lemmon Survey	·	480 m	MPC; JPL
815170	2009 SU_{231}	—	September 28, 2002	Haleakala	NEAT	·	650 m	MPC; JPL
815171	2009 SE_{242}	—	September 21, 2009	Catalina	CSS	TIR	2.0 km	MPC; JPL
815172	2009 SR_{245}	—	September 17, 2009	Mount Lemmon	Mount Lemmon Survey	T_{j} (2.99) · 3:2	5.4 km	MPC; JPL
815173	2009 SS_{247}	—	March 18, 2002	Kitt Peak	Deep Ecliptic Survey	L4	5.7 km	MPC; JPL
815174	2009 SM_{261}	—	September 15, 2009	Kitt Peak	Spacewatch	·	1.9 km	MPC; JPL
815175	2009 SU_{261}	—	August 16, 2009	Kitt Peak	Spacewatch	·	650 m	MPC; JPL
815176	2009 SA_{269}	—	September 12, 2009	Kitt Peak	Spacewatch	MAS	520 m	MPC; JPL
815177	2009 SR_{269}	—	September 16, 2009	Kitt Peak	Spacewatch	·	650 m	MPC; JPL
815178	2009 SU_{269}	—	September 24, 2009	Kitt Peak	Spacewatch	·	430 m	MPC; JPL
815179	2009 SZ_{271}	—	September 16, 2009	Kitt Peak	Spacewatch	·	430 m	MPC; JPL
815180	2009 SU_{280}	—	September 25, 2009	Kitt Peak	Spacewatch	·	660 m	MPC; JPL
815181	2009 SO_{286}	—	September 25, 2009	Kitt Peak	Spacewatch	·	2.1 km	MPC; JPL
815182	2009 SH_{294}	—	May 25, 2009	Kitt Peak	Spacewatch	EUP	2.9 km	MPC; JPL
815183	2009 SQ_{303}	—	August 29, 2009	Kitt Peak	Spacewatch	·	1.5 km	MPC; JPL
815184	2009 SK_{306}	—	September 17, 2009	Kitt Peak	Spacewatch	·	1.3 km	MPC; JPL
815185	2009 SG_{307}	—	September 17, 2009	Kitt Peak	Spacewatch	·	440 m	MPC; JPL
815186	2009 SV_{314}	—	September 19, 2009	Kitt Peak	Spacewatch	·	480 m	MPC; JPL
815187	2009 SH_{317}	—	September 19, 2009	Mount Lemmon	Mount Lemmon Survey	HYG	1.6 km	MPC; JPL
815188	2009 SP_{317}	—	March 28, 2008	Mount Lemmon	Mount Lemmon Survey	·	670 m	MPC; JPL
815189	2009 SQ_{323}	—	September 23, 2009	Mount Lemmon	Mount Lemmon Survey	·	1.7 km	MPC; JPL
815190	2009 SS_{324}	—	September 24, 2009	Zelenchukskaya	T. V. Krjačko, B. Satovski	·	630 m	MPC; JPL
815191	2009 SJ_{331}	—	November 9, 2006	Kitt Peak	Spacewatch	·	480 m	MPC; JPL
815192	2009 SS_{331}	—	September 21, 2009	Catalina	CSS	·	2.8 km	MPC; JPL
815193	2009 SG_{335}	—	April 7, 2013	Mount Lemmon	Mount Lemmon Survey	·	2.2 km	MPC; JPL
815194	2009 SH_{339}	—	September 30, 2009	Mount Lemmon	Mount Lemmon Survey	·	1 km	MPC; JPL
815195	2009 SV_{351}	—	September 23, 2009	Kitt Peak	Spacewatch	·	2.1 km	MPC; JPL
815196	2009 SA_{363}	—	September 15, 2009	Kitt Peak	Spacewatch	·	1.4 km	MPC; JPL
815197	2009 SS_{371}	—	September 21, 2009	Mount Lemmon	Mount Lemmon Survey	·	980 m	MPC; JPL
815198	2009 SA_{373}	—	September 27, 2009	Kitt Peak	Spacewatch	·	780 m	MPC; JPL
815199	2009 SF_{374}	—	September 21, 2009	Mount Lemmon	Mount Lemmon Survey	·	1.0 km	MPC; JPL
815200	2009 ST_{374}	—	September 23, 2013	Mount Lemmon	Mount Lemmon Survey	·	890 m	MPC; JPL

== 815201–815300 ==
back to top

Designation			Discovery			Properties		Ref
Permanent	Provisional	Named after	Date	Site	Discoverer(s)	Category	Diam.	Ref
815201	2009 SW_{374}	—	April 23, 2012	Kitt Peak	Spacewatch	·	680 m	MPC; JPL
815202	2009 SC_{375}	—	March 28, 2012	Mount Lemmon	Mount Lemmon Survey	·	710 m	MPC; JPL
815203	2009 SU_{375}	—	September 27, 2009	Kitt Peak	Spacewatch	·	430 m	MPC; JPL
815204	2009 ST_{376}	—	September 23, 2009	Mount Lemmon	Mount Lemmon Survey	·	1.8 km	MPC; JPL
815205	2009 SY_{376}	—	March 15, 2012	Kitt Peak	Spacewatch	·	1.4 km	MPC; JPL
815206	2009 SG_{378}	—	August 30, 2016	Haleakala	Pan-STARRS 1	·	910 m	MPC; JPL
815207	2009 SG_{379}	—	September 25, 2009	Kitt Peak	Spacewatch	·	790 m	MPC; JPL
815208	2009 SJ_{380}	—	September 25, 2009	Kitt Peak	Spacewatch	VER	1.8 km	MPC; JPL
815209	2009 SO_{382}	—	September 17, 2009	Mount Lemmon	Mount Lemmon Survey	·	590 m	MPC; JPL
815210	2009 SB_{383}	—	September 28, 2009	Mount Lemmon	Mount Lemmon Survey	·	430 m	MPC; JPL
815211	2009 SM_{383}	—	September 21, 2009	Mount Lemmon	Mount Lemmon Survey	·	530 m	MPC; JPL
815212	2009 SW_{383}	—	September 16, 2009	Kitt Peak	Spacewatch	·	490 m	MPC; JPL
815213	2009 SX_{384}	—	May 21, 2015	Haleakala	Pan-STARRS 1	·	610 m	MPC; JPL
815214	2009 SY_{384}	—	January 16, 2018	Haleakala	Pan-STARRS 1	·	530 m	MPC; JPL
815215	2009 SN_{385}	—	August 10, 2016	Haleakala	Pan-STARRS 1	·	580 m	MPC; JPL
815216	2009 SA_{387}	—	September 18, 2009	Kitt Peak	Spacewatch	·	1.1 km	MPC; JPL
815217	2009 SS_{387}	—	February 11, 2018	Haleakala	Pan-STARRS 1	V	410 m	MPC; JPL
815218	2009 SD_{389}	—	January 3, 2014	Kitt Peak	Spacewatch	·	500 m	MPC; JPL
815219	2009 SG_{389}	—	October 8, 2016	Haleakala	Pan-STARRS 1	·	540 m	MPC; JPL
815220	2009 SR_{390}	—	September 24, 2009	Mount Lemmon	Mount Lemmon Survey	·	2.6 km	MPC; JPL
815221	2009 SV_{392}	—	September 29, 2009	Kitt Peak	Spacewatch	·	1.7 km	MPC; JPL
815222	2009 SE_{394}	—	February 7, 2011	Mount Lemmon	Mount Lemmon Survey	·	690 m	MPC; JPL
815223	2009 SE_{395}	—	September 22, 2009	Kitt Peak	Spacewatch	·	900 m	MPC; JPL
815224	2009 SW_{400}	—	September 27, 2009	Mount Lemmon	Mount Lemmon Survey	LIX	2.6 km	MPC; JPL
815225	2009 SB_{401}	—	September 22, 2009	Mount Lemmon	Mount Lemmon Survey	HYG	2.4 km	MPC; JPL
815226	2009 SO_{401}	—	October 18, 1998	Kitt Peak	Spacewatch	·	2.0 km	MPC; JPL
815227	2009 SV_{401}	—	September 26, 2009	Kitt Peak	Spacewatch	·	2.2 km	MPC; JPL
815228	2009 SA_{403}	—	September 22, 2009	Mount Lemmon	Mount Lemmon Survey	MAS	560 m	MPC; JPL
815229	2009 SO_{403}	—	September 19, 2009	Mount Lemmon	Mount Lemmon Survey	MAS	530 m	MPC; JPL
815230	2009 ST_{403}	—	September 19, 2009	Kitt Peak	Spacewatch	·	2.4 km	MPC; JPL
815231	2009 SU_{403}	—	September 28, 2009	Mount Lemmon	Mount Lemmon Survey	L4	5.3 km	MPC; JPL
815232	2009 SA_{406}	—	September 19, 2009	Kitt Peak	Spacewatch	·	2.2 km	MPC; JPL
815233	2009 SF_{406}	—	September 21, 2009	Kitt Peak	Spacewatch	·	500 m	MPC; JPL
815234	2009 ST_{406}	—	September 28, 2009	Mount Lemmon	Mount Lemmon Survey	PHO	490 m	MPC; JPL
815235	2009 SF_{407}	—	August 2, 2016	Haleakala	Pan-STARRS 1	·	640 m	MPC; JPL
815236	2009 SH_{409}	—	September 17, 2009	Kitt Peak	Spacewatch	·	2.2 km	MPC; JPL
815237	2009 SL_{411}	—	September 29, 2009	Mount Lemmon	Mount Lemmon Survey	NYS	680 m	MPC; JPL
815238	2009 SP_{411}	—	September 16, 2009	Kitt Peak	Spacewatch	V	430 m	MPC; JPL
815239	2009 SY_{411}	—	September 29, 2009	Kitt Peak	Spacewatch	·	830 m	MPC; JPL
815240	2009 SC_{412}	—	September 19, 2009	Mount Lemmon	Mount Lemmon Survey	(2076)	530 m	MPC; JPL
815241	2009 SX_{416}	—	September 18, 2009	Kitt Peak	Spacewatch	·	880 m	MPC; JPL
815242	2009 SM_{420}	—	September 20, 2009	Mount Lemmon	Mount Lemmon Survey	(5)	960 m	MPC; JPL
815243	2009 SF_{422}	—	September 16, 2009	Kitt Peak	Spacewatch	·	1.1 km	MPC; JPL
815244	2009 SJ_{428}	—	September 18, 2009	Kitt Peak	Spacewatch	·	680 m	MPC; JPL
815245	2009 TW	—	September 22, 2009	Catalina	CSS	·	1.3 km	MPC; JPL
815246	2009 TB_{4}	—	October 11, 2009	Pla D'Arguines	R. Ferrando, Ferrando, M.	BAR	950 m	MPC; JPL
815247	2009 TC_{10}	—	August 27, 2009	Catalina	CSS	·	1.2 km	MPC; JPL
815248	2009 TW_{13}	—	November 25, 2005	Catalina	CSS	·	1.2 km	MPC; JPL
815249	2009 TO_{22}	—	September 18, 2009	Kitt Peak	Spacewatch	DOR	1.7 km	MPC; JPL
815250	2009 TS_{28}	—	September 25, 2009	Kitt Peak	Spacewatch	THM	1.6 km	MPC; JPL
815251	2009 TJ_{29}	—	September 20, 2009	Kitt Peak	Spacewatch	V	390 m	MPC; JPL
815252	2009 TJ_{42}	—	October 11, 2009	Mount Lemmon	Mount Lemmon Survey	·	1.1 km	MPC; JPL
815253	2009 TN_{50}	—	February 20, 2015	Haleakala	Pan-STARRS 1	MAR	800 m	MPC; JPL
815254	2009 TQ_{50}	—	October 2, 2016	Mount Lemmon	Mount Lemmon Survey	PHO	820 m	MPC; JPL
815255	2009 TU_{53}	—	October 2, 2009	Mount Lemmon	Mount Lemmon Survey	·	1.4 km	MPC; JPL
815256	2009 TP_{54}	—	October 12, 2009	Mount Lemmon	Mount Lemmon Survey	NYS	920 m	MPC; JPL
815257	2009 TN_{55}	—	October 14, 2009	Mount Lemmon	Mount Lemmon Survey	MAS	440 m	MPC; JPL
815258	2009 TW_{56}	—	October 15, 2009	Mount Lemmon	Mount Lemmon Survey	·	1.0 km	MPC; JPL
815259	2009 TG_{59}	—	October 11, 2009	Mount Lemmon	Mount Lemmon Survey	·	1.1 km	MPC; JPL
815260	2009 UG_{2}	—	September 19, 2009	Kitt Peak	Spacewatch	MAS	490 m	MPC; JPL
815261	2009 UL_{7}	—	October 16, 2009	Mount Lemmon	Mount Lemmon Survey	·	480 m	MPC; JPL
815262	2009 UM_{14}	—	October 18, 2009	Vicques	M. Ory	·	2.2 km	MPC; JPL
815263	2009 UT_{20}	—	October 24, 2009	Catalina	CSS	·	940 m	MPC; JPL
815264	2009 UD_{21}	—	September 16, 2009	Mount Lemmon	Mount Lemmon Survey	H	460 m	MPC; JPL
815265	2009 UE_{21}	—	October 23, 2009	Marly	P. Kocher	NYS	820 m	MPC; JPL
815266	2009 UY_{23}	—	October 18, 2009	Mount Lemmon	Mount Lemmon Survey	·	490 m	MPC; JPL
815267	2009 UV_{35}	—	October 21, 2009	Mount Lemmon	Mount Lemmon Survey	·	2.6 km	MPC; JPL
815268	2009 UZ_{36}	—	September 16, 2009	Mount Lemmon	Mount Lemmon Survey	·	1.0 km	MPC; JPL
815269	2009 UL_{38}	—	September 22, 2009	Mount Lemmon	Mount Lemmon Survey	·	1.5 km	MPC; JPL
815270	2009 UL_{41}	—	May 16, 2005	Mount Lemmon	Mount Lemmon Survey	·	540 m	MPC; JPL
815271	2009 UQ_{44}	—	October 18, 2009	Mount Lemmon	Mount Lemmon Survey	THM	1.8 km	MPC; JPL
815272	2009 UF_{47}	—	September 21, 2009	Mount Lemmon	Mount Lemmon Survey	·	530 m	MPC; JPL
815273	2009 UK_{47}	—	October 18, 2009	Kitt Peak	Spacewatch	·	510 m	MPC; JPL
815274	2009 UE_{48}	—	October 22, 2009	Mount Lemmon	Mount Lemmon Survey	·	650 m	MPC; JPL
815275	2009 UD_{49}	—	September 22, 2009	Kitt Peak	Spacewatch	EOS	1.4 km	MPC; JPL
815276	2009 UH_{49}	—	October 22, 2009	Mount Lemmon	Mount Lemmon Survey	·	520 m	MPC; JPL
815277	2009 UW_{57}	—	October 23, 2009	Mount Lemmon	Mount Lemmon Survey	·	1.3 km	MPC; JPL
815278	2009 UA_{65}	—	October 17, 2009	Mount Lemmon	Mount Lemmon Survey	·	510 m	MPC; JPL
815279	2009 UC_{66}	—	October 17, 2009	Mount Lemmon	Mount Lemmon Survey	·	2.2 km	MPC; JPL
815280	2009 UZ_{74}	—	October 14, 2009	Catalina	CSS	·	1.2 km	MPC; JPL
815281	2009 UW_{76}	—	September 20, 2009	Kitt Peak	Spacewatch	·	2.0 km	MPC; JPL
815282	2009 UD_{77}	—	September 29, 2009	Mount Lemmon	Mount Lemmon Survey	·	1.3 km	MPC; JPL
815283	2009 UV_{81}	—	September 16, 2009	Mount Lemmon	Mount Lemmon Survey	·	2.0 km	MPC; JPL
815284	2009 UD_{84}	—	October 21, 2003	Kitt Peak	Spacewatch	·	1.9 km	MPC; JPL
815285	2009 UO_{93}	—	September 16, 2009	Mount Lemmon	Mount Lemmon Survey	·	420 m	MPC; JPL
815286	2009 UR_{98}	—	October 21, 1995	Kitt Peak	Spacewatch	·	600 m	MPC; JPL
815287	2009 UE_{101}	—	October 23, 2009	Mount Lemmon	Mount Lemmon Survey	MAS	550 m	MPC; JPL
815288	2009 UA_{102}	—	September 21, 2009	Mount Lemmon	Mount Lemmon Survey	·	1.0 km	MPC; JPL
815289	2009 UM_{104}	—	October 25, 2009	Mount Lemmon	Mount Lemmon Survey	·	730 m	MPC; JPL
815290	2009 UK_{111}	—	October 23, 2009	Kitt Peak	Spacewatch	·	680 m	MPC; JPL
815291	2009 UT_{112}	—	September 16, 2009	Mount Lemmon	Mount Lemmon Survey	·	620 m	MPC; JPL
815292	2009 UY_{112}	—	October 26, 2009	Mount Lemmon	Mount Lemmon Survey	·	640 m	MPC; JPL
815293	2009 UJ_{116}	—	October 22, 2009	Mount Lemmon	Mount Lemmon Survey	HNS	780 m	MPC; JPL
815294	2009 UN_{123}	—	October 26, 2009	Mount Lemmon	Mount Lemmon Survey	·	1.2 km	MPC; JPL
815295	2009 UO_{125}	—	October 26, 2009	Mount Lemmon	Mount Lemmon Survey	·	770 m	MPC; JPL
815296	2009 UX_{127}	—	October 23, 2009	Kitt Peak	Spacewatch	H	450 m	MPC; JPL
815297	2009 UO_{128}	—	October 29, 2009	Nazaret	G. Muler, J. M. Ruiz	·	1.3 km	MPC; JPL
815298	2009 UU_{133}	—	December 27, 2006	Mount Lemmon	Mount Lemmon Survey	·	580 m	MPC; JPL
815299	2009 UT_{150}	—	October 22, 2009	Mount Lemmon	Mount Lemmon Survey	·	770 m	MPC; JPL
815300	2009 UX_{154}	—	October 18, 2009	Mount Lemmon	Mount Lemmon Survey	NYS	920 m	MPC; JPL

== 815301–815400 ==
back to top

Designation			Discovery			Properties		Ref
Permanent	Provisional	Named after	Date	Site	Discoverer(s)	Category	Diam.	Ref
815301	2009 UO_{159}	—	October 18, 2009	Mount Lemmon	Mount Lemmon Survey	·	900 m	MPC; JPL
815302	2009 UF_{165}	—	October 30, 2009	Mount Lemmon	Mount Lemmon Survey	·	830 m	MPC; JPL
815303	2009 UM_{165}	—	October 23, 2009	Kitt Peak	Spacewatch	PHO	700 m	MPC; JPL
815304	2009 UQ_{167}	—	October 22, 2009	Mount Lemmon	Mount Lemmon Survey	·	540 m	MPC; JPL
815305	2009 UY_{167}	—	October 26, 2009	Kitt Peak	Spacewatch	V	480 m	MPC; JPL
815306	2009 UA_{168}	—	October 23, 2009	Kitt Peak	Spacewatch	·	480 m	MPC; JPL
815307	2009 UC_{168}	—	May 1, 2017	Mount Lemmon	Mount Lemmon Survey	·	2.1 km	MPC; JPL
815308	2009 UH_{168}	—	February 9, 2011	Mount Lemmon	Mount Lemmon Survey	·	1.9 km	MPC; JPL
815309	2009 UU_{168}	—	May 25, 2015	Haleakala	Pan-STARRS 1	·	560 m	MPC; JPL
815310	2009 US_{169}	—	December 31, 2013	Haleakala	Pan-STARRS 1	·	450 m	MPC; JPL
815311	2009 UD_{170}	—	October 16, 2009	Mount Lemmon	Mount Lemmon Survey	·	690 m	MPC; JPL
815312	2009 UA_{172}	—	October 21, 2009	Zelenchukskaya	T. V. Krjačko, B. Satovski	·	530 m	MPC; JPL
815313	2009 UY_{172}	—	August 26, 2012	Haleakala	Pan-STARRS 1	·	570 m	MPC; JPL
815314	2009 UZ_{172}	—	September 14, 2013	Haleakala	Pan-STARRS 1	·	850 m	MPC; JPL
815315	2009 UV_{176}	—	October 24, 2009	Kitt Peak	Spacewatch	·	810 m	MPC; JPL
815316	2009 UQ_{177}	—	October 24, 2009	Kitt Peak	Spacewatch	·	670 m	MPC; JPL
815317	2009 UG_{178}	—	October 25, 2009	Kitt Peak	Spacewatch	MAS	440 m	MPC; JPL
815318	2009 UL_{178}	—	October 24, 2009	Kitt Peak	Spacewatch	·	880 m	MPC; JPL
815319	2009 UX_{178}	—	October 26, 2009	Mount Lemmon	Mount Lemmon Survey	·	2.5 km	MPC; JPL
815320	2009 UC_{179}	—	October 16, 2009	Mount Lemmon	Mount Lemmon Survey	MAS	460 m	MPC; JPL
815321	2009 UF_{183}	—	October 22, 2009	Mount Lemmon	Mount Lemmon Survey	PHO	670 m	MPC; JPL
815322	2009 UE_{184}	—	October 27, 2009	Kitt Peak	Spacewatch	·	570 m	MPC; JPL
815323	2009 UL_{187}	—	October 22, 2009	Mount Lemmon	Mount Lemmon Survey	·	840 m	MPC; JPL
815324	2009 UP_{189}	—	October 22, 2009	Mount Lemmon	Mount Lemmon Survey	·	490 m	MPC; JPL
815325	2009 UW_{191}	—	October 23, 2009	Mount Lemmon	Mount Lemmon Survey	L4	6.4 km	MPC; JPL
815326	2009 UQ_{194}	—	October 22, 2009	Mount Lemmon	Mount Lemmon Survey	V	480 m	MPC; JPL
815327	2009 VO_{4}	—	November 8, 2009	Kitt Peak	Spacewatch	·	510 m	MPC; JPL
815328	2009 VB_{5}	—	October 24, 2009	Kitt Peak	Spacewatch	NYS	770 m	MPC; JPL
815329	2009 VX_{6}	—	November 8, 2009	Mount Lemmon	Mount Lemmon Survey	H	390 m	MPC; JPL
815330	2009 VE_{11}	—	September 16, 2009	Mount Lemmon	Mount Lemmon Survey	V	470 m	MPC; JPL
815331	2009 VK_{16}	—	September 30, 2009	Mount Lemmon	Mount Lemmon Survey	EUN	880 m	MPC; JPL
815332	2009 VM_{16}	—	November 8, 2009	Mount Lemmon	Mount Lemmon Survey	TIR	2.2 km	MPC; JPL
815333	2009 VN_{18}	—	November 9, 2009	Kitt Peak	Spacewatch	·	660 m	MPC; JPL
815334	2009 VM_{22}	—	November 9, 2009	Mount Lemmon	Mount Lemmon Survey	·	600 m	MPC; JPL
815335	2009 VA_{26}	—	November 11, 2009	Mount Lemmon	Mount Lemmon Survey	APO · PHA	250 m	MPC; JPL
815336	2009 VR_{30}	—	October 26, 2009	Kitt Peak	Spacewatch	·	570 m	MPC; JPL
815337	2009 VS_{31}	—	October 26, 2009	Kitt Peak	Spacewatch	·	2.5 km	MPC; JPL
815338	2009 VX_{34}	—	October 24, 2009	Kitt Peak	Spacewatch	NYS	740 m	MPC; JPL
815339	2009 VO_{35}	—	November 10, 2009	Mount Lemmon	Mount Lemmon Survey	·	2.2 km	MPC; JPL
815340	2009 VB_{48}	—	November 9, 2009	Mount Lemmon	Mount Lemmon Survey	·	770 m	MPC; JPL
815341	2009 VT_{63}	—	November 8, 2009	Kitt Peak	Spacewatch	·	780 m	MPC; JPL
815342	2009 VC_{65}	—	November 9, 2009	Catalina	CSS	·	2.4 km	MPC; JPL
815343	2009 VJ_{66}	—	November 9, 2009	Kitt Peak	Spacewatch	(5)	810 m	MPC; JPL
815344	2009 VD_{74}	—	November 11, 2009	Mount Lemmon	Mount Lemmon Survey	·	1.9 km	MPC; JPL
815345	2009 VP_{76}	—	November 8, 2009	Catalina	CSS	H	320 m	MPC; JPL
815346	2009 VQ_{87}	—	November 10, 2009	Kitt Peak	Spacewatch	EUN	920 m	MPC; JPL
815347	2009 VT_{97}	—	October 26, 2009	Kitt Peak	Spacewatch	·	660 m	MPC; JPL
815348	2009 VD_{99}	—	November 9, 2009	Mount Lemmon	Mount Lemmon Survey	EOS	1.3 km	MPC; JPL
815349	2009 VT_{102}	—	December 10, 2005	Kitt Peak	Spacewatch	·	890 m	MPC; JPL
815350	2009 VT_{113}	—	November 10, 2009	Kitt Peak	Spacewatch	·	1.3 km	MPC; JPL
815351	2009 VQ_{117}	—	September 16, 2009	Mount Lemmon	Mount Lemmon Survey	(5)	990 m	MPC; JPL
815352	2009 VN_{119}	—	November 10, 2009	Kitt Peak	Spacewatch	·	870 m	MPC; JPL
815353	2009 VP_{122}	—	November 9, 2009	Mount Lemmon	Mount Lemmon Survey	·	1.5 km	MPC; JPL
815354	2009 VG_{123}	—	March 2, 2011	Kitt Peak	Spacewatch	·	570 m	MPC; JPL
815355	2009 VW_{123}	—	February 7, 2011	Mount Lemmon	Mount Lemmon Survey	·	550 m	MPC; JPL
815356	2009 VK_{124}	—	March 7, 2016	Haleakala	Pan-STARRS 1	EUN	960 m	MPC; JPL
815357	2009 VC_{125}	—	August 26, 2016	Haleakala	Pan-STARRS 1	·	980 m	MPC; JPL
815358	2009 VK_{127}	—	November 11, 2009	Kitt Peak	Spacewatch	·	2.8 km	MPC; JPL
815359	2009 VW_{127}	—	November 9, 2009	Mount Lemmon	Mount Lemmon Survey	·	2.3 km	MPC; JPL
815360	2009 VK_{128}	—	November 8, 2009	Mount Lemmon	Mount Lemmon Survey	·	2.3 km	MPC; JPL
815361	2009 VU_{128}	—	November 9, 2009	Mount Lemmon	Mount Lemmon Survey	·	2.1 km	MPC; JPL
815362	2009 WK_{3}	—	November 16, 2009	Mount Lemmon	Mount Lemmon Survey	·	1.1 km	MPC; JPL
815363	2009 WF_{18}	—	November 17, 2009	Mount Lemmon	Mount Lemmon Survey	·	1.9 km	MPC; JPL
815364	2009 WF_{23}	—	November 11, 2009	Kitt Peak	Spacewatch	·	1.6 km	MPC; JPL
815365	2009 WK_{23}	—	November 18, 2009	Kitt Peak	Spacewatch	·	650 m	MPC; JPL
815366	2009 WH_{31}	—	November 16, 2009	Kitt Peak	Spacewatch	·	610 m	MPC; JPL
815367	2009 WB_{32}	—	November 16, 2009	Kitt Peak	Spacewatch	·	1.1 km	MPC; JPL
815368	2009 WQ_{39}	—	November 17, 2009	Kitt Peak	Spacewatch	·	1.2 km	MPC; JPL
815369	2009 WO_{40}	—	October 16, 2009	Mount Lemmon	Mount Lemmon Survey	·	970 m	MPC; JPL
815370	2009 WO_{42}	—	November 9, 2009	Kitt Peak	Spacewatch	·	850 m	MPC; JPL
815371	2009 WT_{44}	—	October 23, 2009	Kitt Peak	Spacewatch	·	740 m	MPC; JPL
815372	2009 WE_{46}	—	September 21, 2009	Mount Lemmon	Mount Lemmon Survey	·	2.4 km	MPC; JPL
815373	2009 WF_{48}	—	November 19, 2009	Mount Lemmon	Mount Lemmon Survey	CLO	1.7 km	MPC; JPL
815374	2009 WO_{49}	—	November 9, 2009	Catalina	CSS	·	680 m	MPC; JPL
815375	2009 WM_{52}	—	November 18, 2009	La Sagra	OAM	·	1.3 km	MPC; JPL
815376	2009 WA_{53}	—	October 12, 2009	Mount Lemmon	Mount Lemmon Survey	·	740 m	MPC; JPL
815377	2009 WS_{55}	—	October 26, 2009	Mount Lemmon	Mount Lemmon Survey	H	470 m	MPC; JPL
815378	2009 WV_{57}	—	November 16, 2009	Mount Lemmon	Mount Lemmon Survey	·	2.2 km	MPC; JPL
815379	2009 WL_{61}	—	November 16, 2009	Mount Lemmon	Mount Lemmon Survey	·	1.2 km	MPC; JPL
815380	2009 WB_{66}	—	November 17, 2009	Mount Lemmon	Mount Lemmon Survey	·	840 m	MPC; JPL
815381	2009 WB_{71}	—	August 28, 2005	Kitt Peak	Spacewatch	·	730 m	MPC; JPL
815382	2009 WY_{78}	—	February 21, 2007	Kitt Peak	Spacewatch	·	650 m	MPC; JPL
815383	2009 WD_{83}	—	November 19, 2009	Kitt Peak	Spacewatch	·	760 m	MPC; JPL
815384	2009 WC_{92}	—	November 19, 2009	Mount Lemmon	Mount Lemmon Survey	·	770 m	MPC; JPL
815385	2009 WU_{93}	—	September 28, 2009	Mount Lemmon	Mount Lemmon Survey	·	2.0 km	MPC; JPL
815386	2009 WO_{98}	—	November 10, 2009	Mount Lemmon	Mount Lemmon Survey	·	1.3 km	MPC; JPL
815387	2009 WS_{102}	—	November 22, 2009	Catalina	CSS	·	990 m	MPC; JPL
815388	2009 WG_{105}	—	November 9, 2009	Kitt Peak	Spacewatch	H	440 m	MPC; JPL
815389	2009 WV_{105}	—	November 10, 2005	Catalina	CSS	·	1.7 km	MPC; JPL
815390	2009 WS_{109}	—	November 17, 2009	Mount Lemmon	Mount Lemmon Survey	·	2.2 km	MPC; JPL
815391	2009 WP_{112}	—	September 18, 2009	Mount Lemmon	Mount Lemmon Survey	·	1.9 km	MPC; JPL
815392	2009 WN_{116}	—	November 20, 2009	Kitt Peak	Spacewatch	·	1.1 km	MPC; JPL
815393	2009 WZ_{117}	—	November 20, 2009	Kitt Peak	Spacewatch	·	770 m	MPC; JPL
815394	2009 WO_{118}	—	November 20, 2009	Kitt Peak	Spacewatch	·	690 m	MPC; JPL
815395	2009 WQ_{119}	—	November 8, 2009	Kitt Peak	Spacewatch	·	2.0 km	MPC; JPL
815396	2009 WK_{126}	—	November 20, 2009	Kitt Peak	Spacewatch	·	890 m	MPC; JPL
815397	2009 WS_{128}	—	October 27, 2009	Kitt Peak	Spacewatch	MAS	570 m	MPC; JPL
815398	2009 WG_{129}	—	November 20, 2009	Mount Lemmon	Mount Lemmon Survey	V	500 m	MPC; JPL
815399	2009 WE_{131}	—	November 20, 2009	Kitt Peak	Spacewatch	·	1.7 km	MPC; JPL
815400	2009 WQ_{136}	—	November 23, 2009	Mount Lemmon	Mount Lemmon Survey	·	2.7 km	MPC; JPL

== 815401–815500 ==
back to top

Designation			Discovery			Properties		Ref
Permanent	Provisional	Named after	Date	Site	Discoverer(s)	Category	Diam.	Ref
815401	2009 WP_{138}	—	September 19, 2009	Mount Lemmon	Mount Lemmon Survey	NYS	860 m	MPC; JPL
815402	2009 WH_{142}	—	November 19, 2009	Kitt Peak	Spacewatch	·	1.0 km	MPC; JPL
815403	2009 WL_{145}	—	September 29, 2009	Mount Lemmon	Mount Lemmon Survey	·	700 m	MPC; JPL
815404	2009 WV_{147}	—	November 19, 2009	Mount Lemmon	Mount Lemmon Survey	·	690 m	MPC; JPL
815405	2009 WE_{148}	—	November 19, 2009	Mount Lemmon	Mount Lemmon Survey	·	860 m	MPC; JPL
815406	2009 WW_{153}	—	November 19, 2009	Mount Lemmon	Mount Lemmon Survey	·	780 m	MPC; JPL
815407	2009 WM_{154}	—	November 19, 2009	Mount Lemmon	Mount Lemmon Survey	·	1.3 km	MPC; JPL
815408	2009 WU_{157}	—	November 20, 2009	Mount Lemmon	Mount Lemmon Survey	·	850 m	MPC; JPL
815409	2009 WL_{158}	—	November 20, 2009	Mount Lemmon	Mount Lemmon Survey	·	1.2 km	MPC; JPL
815410	2009 WH_{161}	—	November 21, 2009	Kitt Peak	Spacewatch	H	400 m	MPC; JPL
815411	2009 WU_{164}	—	November 21, 2009	Kitt Peak	Spacewatch	·	780 m	MPC; JPL
815412	2009 WW_{166}	—	November 21, 2009	Kitt Peak	Spacewatch	(5)	800 m	MPC; JPL
815413	2009 WG_{171}	—	November 22, 2009	Mount Lemmon	Mount Lemmon Survey	WIT	700 m	MPC; JPL
815414	2009 WW_{171}	—	October 23, 2009	Kitt Peak	Spacewatch	PHO	640 m	MPC; JPL
815415	2009 WM_{174}	—	November 22, 2009	Kitt Peak	Spacewatch	·	650 m	MPC; JPL
815416	2009 WF_{175}	—	November 11, 2009	Kitt Peak	Spacewatch	·	780 m	MPC; JPL
815417	2009 WO_{188}	—	November 11, 2009	Kitt Peak	Spacewatch	H	460 m	MPC; JPL
815418	2009 WW_{189}	—	November 24, 2009	Kitt Peak	Spacewatch	·	740 m	MPC; JPL
815419	2009 WH_{191}	—	October 23, 2009	Mount Lemmon	Mount Lemmon Survey	·	1.4 km	MPC; JPL
815420	2009 WO_{191}	—	October 24, 2009	Kitt Peak	Spacewatch	·	630 m	MPC; JPL
815421	2009 WB_{197}	—	October 26, 2009	Kitt Peak	Spacewatch	·	490 m	MPC; JPL
815422	2009 WE_{198}	—	November 11, 2009	Kitt Peak	Spacewatch	·	520 m	MPC; JPL
815423	2009 WJ_{199}	—	November 18, 2009	Mount Lemmon	Mount Lemmon Survey	·	830 m	MPC; JPL
815424	2009 WQ_{199}	—	November 26, 2009	Mount Lemmon	Mount Lemmon Survey	·	1.2 km	MPC; JPL
815425	2009 WL_{200}	—	November 19, 2009	Kitt Peak	Spacewatch	·	590 m	MPC; JPL
815426	2009 WS_{201}	—	November 26, 2009	Mount Lemmon	Mount Lemmon Survey	·	2.4 km	MPC; JPL
815427	2009 WN_{205}	—	November 17, 2009	Kitt Peak	Spacewatch	ERI	1.1 km	MPC; JPL
815428	2009 WP_{208}	—	November 8, 2009	Mount Lemmon	Mount Lemmon Survey	·	1.3 km	MPC; JPL
815429	2009 WX_{210}	—	November 18, 2009	Kitt Peak	Spacewatch	·	740 m	MPC; JPL
815430	2009 WQ_{213}	—	November 19, 2009	Kitt Peak	Spacewatch	·	670 m	MPC; JPL
815431	2009 WK_{219}	—	November 16, 2009	Kitt Peak	Spacewatch	·	710 m	MPC; JPL
815432	2009 WV_{228}	—	November 17, 2009	Mount Lemmon	Mount Lemmon Survey	·	630 m	MPC; JPL
815433	2009 WR_{234}	—	November 19, 2009	Kitt Peak	Spacewatch	·	2.7 km	MPC; JPL
815434	2009 WX_{235}	—	November 20, 2009	Mount Lemmon	Mount Lemmon Survey	·	610 m	MPC; JPL
815435	2009 WT_{246}	—	November 24, 2009	XuYi	PMO NEO Survey Program	·	2.7 km	MPC; JPL
815436	2009 WM_{247}	—	September 29, 2009	Mount Lemmon	Mount Lemmon Survey	·	800 m	MPC; JPL
815437	2009 WD_{258}	—	November 26, 2009	Kitt Peak	Spacewatch	H	380 m	MPC; JPL
815438	2009 WV_{259}	—	November 21, 2009	Mount Lemmon	Mount Lemmon Survey	·	1.6 km	MPC; JPL
815439	2009 WF_{264}	—	November 21, 2009	Mount Lemmon	Mount Lemmon Survey	TIR	2.2 km	MPC; JPL
815440	2009 WP_{266}	—	July 7, 2013	Kitt Peak	Spacewatch	·	1.6 km	MPC; JPL
815441	2009 WK_{272}	—	November 18, 2009	Kitt Peak	Spacewatch	(5)	1.0 km	MPC; JPL
815442	2009 WV_{273}	—	August 27, 2013	Haleakala	Pan-STARRS 1	·	1.7 km	MPC; JPL
815443	2009 WC_{274}	—	October 6, 2013	Mount Lemmon	Mount Lemmon Survey	HNS	800 m	MPC; JPL
815444	2009 WK_{274}	—	May 1, 2011	Mount Lemmon	Mount Lemmon Survey	·	790 m	MPC; JPL
815445	2009 WM_{274}	—	August 2, 2016	Haleakala	Pan-STARRS 1	NYS	800 m	MPC; JPL
815446	2009 WQ_{274}	—	November 8, 2013	Mount Lemmon	Mount Lemmon Survey	EUN	860 m	MPC; JPL
815447	2009 WT_{274}	—	October 12, 2009	Mount Lemmon	Mount Lemmon Survey	KON	1.6 km	MPC; JPL
815448	2009 WC_{275}	—	April 27, 2012	Haleakala	Pan-STARRS 1	·	1.1 km	MPC; JPL
815449	2009 WE_{275}	—	June 10, 2014	Mount Lemmon	Mount Lemmon Survey	·	2.2 km	MPC; JPL
815450	2009 WT_{275}	—	November 8, 2013	Mount Lemmon	Mount Lemmon Survey	·	1.1 km	MPC; JPL
815451	2009 WH_{276}	—	November 18, 2009	Kitt Peak	Spacewatch	·	720 m	MPC; JPL
815452	2009 WO_{279}	—	October 25, 2009	Kitt Peak	Spacewatch	·	640 m	MPC; JPL
815453	2009 WE_{280}	—	September 24, 2014	Kitt Peak	Spacewatch	·	1.6 km	MPC; JPL
815454	2009 WE_{281}	—	January 17, 2015	Haleakala	Pan-STARRS 1	·	1.2 km	MPC; JPL
815455	2009 WK_{282}	—	November 17, 2009	Mount Lemmon	Mount Lemmon Survey	V	460 m	MPC; JPL
815456	2009 WC_{283}	—	December 8, 2015	Haleakala	Pan-STARRS 1	·	2.6 km	MPC; JPL
815457	2009 WE_{283}	—	November 27, 2009	Kitt Peak	Spacewatch	·	800 m	MPC; JPL
815458	2009 WJ_{284}	—	April 9, 2015	Mount Lemmon	Mount Lemmon Survey	(5)	820 m	MPC; JPL
815459	2009 WP_{284}	—	November 11, 2016	Mount Lemmon	Mount Lemmon Survey	·	650 m	MPC; JPL
815460	2009 WV_{285}	—	February 20, 2014	Haleakala	Pan-STARRS 1	V	490 m	MPC; JPL
815461	2009 WN_{287}	—	November 23, 2009	Mount Lemmon	Mount Lemmon Survey	·	600 m	MPC; JPL
815462	2009 WR_{287}	—	September 30, 2016	Haleakala	Pan-STARRS 1	·	840 m	MPC; JPL
815463	2009 WO_{288}	—	November 24, 2009	Kitt Peak	Spacewatch	·	530 m	MPC; JPL
815464	2009 WH_{290}	—	November 24, 2009	Kitt Peak	Spacewatch	·	720 m	MPC; JPL
815465	2009 WJ_{290}	—	November 24, 2009	Kitt Peak	Spacewatch	·	2.4 km	MPC; JPL
815466	2009 WW_{290}	—	November 17, 2009	Mount Lemmon	Mount Lemmon Survey	·	2.2 km	MPC; JPL
815467	2009 WU_{291}	—	November 25, 2009	Kitt Peak	Spacewatch	NYS	810 m	MPC; JPL
815468	2009 WQ_{293}	—	November 17, 2009	Mount Lemmon	Mount Lemmon Survey	V	440 m	MPC; JPL
815469	2009 WO_{294}	—	November 23, 2009	Mount Lemmon	Mount Lemmon Survey	NYS	800 m	MPC; JPL
815470	2009 WY_{295}	—	November 22, 2009	Kitt Peak	Spacewatch	·	1.3 km	MPC; JPL
815471	2009 XK_{6}	—	September 25, 2009	Črni Vrh	Vales, J.	·	1.0 km	MPC; JPL
815472	2009 XR_{12}	—	November 9, 2009	Kitt Peak	Spacewatch	·	2.5 km	MPC; JPL
815473	2009 XP_{13}	—	December 13, 2009	Mount Lemmon	Mount Lemmon Survey	V	460 m	MPC; JPL
815474	2009 XK_{14}	—	December 15, 2009	Catalina	CSS	·	730 m	MPC; JPL
815475	2009 XC_{18}	—	September 11, 2004	Palomar	NEAT	JUN	900 m	MPC; JPL
815476	2009 XW_{19}	—	December 15, 2009	Mount Lemmon	Mount Lemmon Survey	·	780 m	MPC; JPL
815477	2009 XT_{20}	—	December 15, 2009	Bergisch Gladbach	W. Bickel	·	2.0 km	MPC; JPL
815478	2009 XP_{23}	—	November 27, 2009	Mount Lemmon	Mount Lemmon Survey	H	540 m	MPC; JPL
815479	2009 XE_{27}	—	December 10, 2009	Mount Lemmon	Mount Lemmon Survey	MAS	440 m	MPC; JPL
815480	2009 XO_{27}	—	May 12, 2012	Haleakala	Pan-STARRS 1	TIR	2.3 km	MPC; JPL
815481	2009 XY_{28}	—	December 10, 2009	Mount Lemmon	Mount Lemmon Survey	MAS	550 m	MPC; JPL
815482	2009 XX_{29}	—	December 11, 2009	Mount Lemmon	Mount Lemmon Survey	H	420 m	MPC; JPL
815483	2009 XJ_{30}	—	December 14, 2009	Mauna Kea	P. A. Wiegert	·	1.6 km	MPC; JPL
815484	2009 XU_{31}	—	December 14, 2009	Mauna Kea	P. A. Wiegert	·	1.5 km	MPC; JPL
815485	2009 YX_{1}	—	December 17, 2009	Mount Lemmon	Mount Lemmon Survey	·	890 m	MPC; JPL
815486	2009 YL_{3}	—	December 17, 2009	Mount Lemmon	Mount Lemmon Survey	H	350 m	MPC; JPL
815487	2009 YV_{3}	—	December 17, 2009	Kitt Peak	Spacewatch	·	2.0 km	MPC; JPL
815488	2009 YT_{4}	—	November 16, 2009	Mount Lemmon	Mount Lemmon Survey	·	770 m	MPC; JPL
815489	2009 YM_{10}	—	October 27, 2009	Kitt Peak	Spacewatch	·	830 m	MPC; JPL
815490	2009 YB_{12}	—	March 4, 2005	Mount Lemmon	Mount Lemmon Survey	·	1.6 km	MPC; JPL
815491	2009 YZ_{15}	—	December 19, 2009	Mount Lemmon	Mount Lemmon Survey	TIR	2.1 km	MPC; JPL
815492	2009 YJ_{29}	—	June 10, 2015	Haleakala	Pan-STARRS 1	·	830 m	MPC; JPL
815493	2009 YQ_{29}	—	October 17, 2013	Mount Lemmon	Mount Lemmon Survey	ADE	1.6 km	MPC; JPL
815494	2009 YY_{29}	—	July 2, 2011	Kitt Peak	Spacewatch	PHO	1.0 km	MPC; JPL
815495	2009 YS_{30}	—	December 20, 2009	Kitt Peak	Spacewatch	·	2.7 km	MPC; JPL
815496	2009 YA_{31}	—	January 29, 2014	Mount Lemmon	Mount Lemmon Survey	·	790 m	MPC; JPL
815497	2009 YB_{31}	—	December 18, 2009	Kitt Peak	Spacewatch	T_{j} (2.98) · 3:2	2.9 km	MPC; JPL
815498	2009 YC_{35}	—	December 18, 2009	Mount Lemmon	Mount Lemmon Survey	·	640 m	MPC; JPL
815499	2010 AX_{4}	—	December 17, 2009	Kitt Peak	Spacewatch	T_{j} (2.96)	3.0 km	MPC; JPL
815500	2010 AL_{6}	—	January 6, 2010	Kitt Peak	Spacewatch	·	720 m	MPC; JPL

== 815501–815600 ==
back to top

Designation			Discovery			Properties		Ref
Permanent	Provisional	Named after	Date	Site	Discoverer(s)	Category	Diam.	Ref
815501	2010 AN_{23}	—	January 6, 2010	Kitt Peak	Spacewatch	EUN	950 m	MPC; JPL
815502	2010 AK_{39}	—	January 7, 2010	Mount Lemmon	Mount Lemmon Survey	·	450 m	MPC; JPL
815503	2010 AL_{46}	—	January 7, 2010	Mount Lemmon	Mount Lemmon Survey	MAS	560 m	MPC; JPL
815504	2010 AS_{46}	—	January 8, 2010	Kitt Peak	Spacewatch	·	1.6 km	MPC; JPL
815505	2010 AK_{48}	—	November 12, 2005	Kitt Peak	Spacewatch	·	880 m	MPC; JPL
815506	2010 AZ_{142}	—	January 7, 2010	Kitt Peak	Spacewatch	·	630 m	MPC; JPL
815507	2010 AM_{143}	—	November 1, 2005	Mount Lemmon	Mount Lemmon Survey	MAS	520 m	MPC; JPL
815508	2010 AO_{144}	—	September 26, 2009	Catalina	CSS	EUP	2.6 km	MPC; JPL
815509	2010 AH_{147}	—	January 12, 2010	WISE	WISE	EMA	2.2 km	MPC; JPL
815510	2010 AN_{149}	—	September 29, 2009	Mount Lemmon	Mount Lemmon Survey	·	2.0 km	MPC; JPL
815511	2010 AY_{154}	—	November 27, 2014	Haleakala	Pan-STARRS 1	H	390 m	MPC; JPL
815512	2010 AH_{155}	—	October 17, 2012	Haleakala	Pan-STARRS 1	·	760 m	MPC; JPL
815513	2010 AA_{156}	—	February 10, 2014	Haleakala	Pan-STARRS 1	·	880 m	MPC; JPL
815514	2010 AO_{156}	—	November 27, 2013	Haleakala	Pan-STARRS 1	·	1.3 km	MPC; JPL
815515	2010 AY_{158}	—	January 22, 2015	Haleakala	Pan-STARRS 1	·	1.5 km	MPC; JPL
815516	2010 AT_{159}	—	January 7, 2010	Kitt Peak	Spacewatch	·	810 m	MPC; JPL
815517	2010 AY_{160}	—	October 15, 2012	Mount Lemmon	Mount Lemmon Survey	·	520 m	MPC; JPL
815518	2010 AM_{161}	—	January 11, 2010	Kitt Peak	Spacewatch	MAS	500 m	MPC; JPL
815519	2010 AZ_{161}	—	January 10, 2010	Kitt Peak	Spacewatch	·	500 m	MPC; JPL
815520	2010 AK_{162}	—	January 13, 2010	Mount Lemmon	Mount Lemmon Survey	·	940 m	MPC; JPL
815521	2010 AJ_{163}	—	January 4, 2010	Kitt Peak	Spacewatch	V	480 m	MPC; JPL
815522	2010 AY_{163}	—	January 11, 2010	Kitt Peak	Spacewatch	·	780 m	MPC; JPL
815523	2010 BB_{140}	—	May 20, 2015	Cerro Tololo	DECam	·	900 m	MPC; JPL
815524	2010 CN_{2}	—	February 5, 2010	Kitt Peak	Spacewatch	·	1.5 km	MPC; JPL
815525	2010 CL_{23}	—	February 10, 1999	Kitt Peak	Spacewatch	MAS	540 m	MPC; JPL
815526	2010 CF_{24}	—	February 9, 2010	Mount Lemmon	Mount Lemmon Survey	MAS	490 m	MPC; JPL
815527	2010 CK_{26}	—	January 17, 2005	Kitt Peak	Spacewatch	·	1.2 km	MPC; JPL
815528	2010 CD_{28}	—	January 11, 2010	Kitt Peak	Spacewatch	·	1.2 km	MPC; JPL
815529	2010 CG_{30}	—	February 9, 2010	Mount Lemmon	Mount Lemmon Survey	·	730 m	MPC; JPL
815530	2010 CS_{32}	—	February 10, 2010	Kitt Peak	Spacewatch	CLA	1.3 km	MPC; JPL
815531	2010 CX_{37}	—	February 12, 1999	Kitt Peak	Spacewatch	·	700 m	MPC; JPL
815532	2010 CJ_{56}	—	April 29, 2006	Kitt Peak	Spacewatch	·	1.0 km	MPC; JPL
815533	2010 CK_{65}	—	February 9, 2010	Kitt Peak	Spacewatch	NYS	810 m	MPC; JPL
815534	2010 CC_{67}	—	January 15, 2010	Kitt Peak	Spacewatch	·	690 m	MPC; JPL
815535	2010 CN_{75}	—	February 13, 2010	Mount Lemmon	Mount Lemmon Survey	MAS	490 m	MPC; JPL
815536	2010 CQ_{78}	—	February 13, 2010	Mount Lemmon	Mount Lemmon Survey	·	960 m	MPC; JPL
815537	2010 CJ_{79}	—	February 13, 2010	Mount Lemmon	Mount Lemmon Survey	·	1.4 km	MPC; JPL
815538	2010 CF_{87}	—	February 14, 2010	Mount Lemmon	Mount Lemmon Survey	·	940 m	MPC; JPL
815539	2010 CK_{87}	—	February 14, 2010	Mount Lemmon	Mount Lemmon Survey	·	870 m	MPC; JPL
815540	2010 CQ_{88}	—	October 6, 2008	Mount Lemmon	Mount Lemmon Survey	EOS	1.2 km	MPC; JPL
815541	2010 CX_{99}	—	January 12, 2010	Kitt Peak	Spacewatch	·	860 m	MPC; JPL
815542	2010 CR_{101}	—	February 14, 2010	Mount Lemmon	Mount Lemmon Survey	·	1.0 km	MPC; JPL
815543	2010 CD_{121}	—	January 8, 2010	Mount Lemmon	Mount Lemmon Survey	·	1.1 km	MPC; JPL
815544	2010 CG_{122}	—	February 15, 2010	Kitt Peak	Spacewatch	·	480 m	MPC; JPL
815545	2010 CG_{139}	—	January 7, 2010	Kitt Peak	Spacewatch	MAS	600 m	MPC; JPL
815546	2010 CL_{147}	—	February 13, 2010	Catalina	CSS	PHO	800 m	MPC; JPL
815547	2010 CN_{148}	—	March 24, 2003	Kitt Peak	Spacewatch	NYS	860 m	MPC; JPL
815548	2010 CG_{154}	—	February 15, 2010	Kitt Peak	Spacewatch	·	940 m	MPC; JPL
815549	2010 CU_{163}	—	February 10, 2010	Kitt Peak	Spacewatch	·	350 m	MPC; JPL
815550	2010 CF_{168}	—	February 15, 2010	Mount Lemmon	Mount Lemmon Survey	NYS	890 m	MPC; JPL
815551	2010 CJ_{170}	—	February 10, 2010	Kitt Peak	Spacewatch	·	460 m	MPC; JPL
815552	2010 CQ_{171}	—	February 14, 2010	Kitt Peak	Spacewatch	·	1.7 km	MPC; JPL
815553	2010 CL_{248}	—	February 9, 2010	Kitt Peak	Spacewatch	MAS	600 m	MPC; JPL
815554	2010 CY_{249}	—	January 6, 2010	Kitt Peak	Spacewatch	MAS	530 m	MPC; JPL
815555	2010 CJ_{250}	—	February 15, 2010	Catalina	CSS	H	420 m	MPC; JPL
815556	2010 CE_{252}	—	January 29, 2014	Kitt Peak	Spacewatch	·	990 m	MPC; JPL
815557	2010 CN_{255}	—	March 18, 2017	Haleakala	Pan-STARRS 1	·	1.5 km	MPC; JPL
815558	2010 CN_{256}	—	July 30, 2017	Haleakala	Pan-STARRS 1	BAR	770 m	MPC; JPL
815559	2010 CT_{257}	—	February 8, 2010	WISE	WISE	·	1.4 km	MPC; JPL
815560	2010 CU_{270}	—	February 9, 2010	Mount Lemmon	Mount Lemmon Survey	·	620 m	MPC; JPL
815561	2010 CT_{271}	—	February 10, 2014	Haleakala	Pan-STARRS 1	PHO	630 m	MPC; JPL
815562	2010 CA_{272}	—	February 15, 2010	Mount Lemmon	Mount Lemmon Survey	·	860 m	MPC; JPL
815563	2010 CK_{272}	—	April 4, 2014	Haleakala	Pan-STARRS 1	·	850 m	MPC; JPL
815564	2010 CS_{272}	—	August 14, 2013	Haleakala	Pan-STARRS 1	·	2.1 km	MPC; JPL
815565	2010 CZ_{272}	—	December 1, 2016	Kitt Peak	Spacewatch	·	910 m	MPC; JPL
815566	2010 CU_{275}	—	February 14, 2010	Mount Lemmon	Mount Lemmon Survey	NYS	850 m	MPC; JPL
815567	2010 CA_{276}	—	February 13, 2010	Mount Lemmon	Mount Lemmon Survey	·	760 m	MPC; JPL
815568	2010 CB_{277}	—	January 31, 2022	Haleakala	Pan-STARRS 2	PHO	770 m	MPC; JPL
815569	2010 DK_{41}	—	February 17, 2010	Kitt Peak	Spacewatch	·	1.5 km	MPC; JPL
815570	2010 DV_{44}	—	February 17, 2010	Kitt Peak	Spacewatch	·	850 m	MPC; JPL
815571	2010 DY_{74}	—	January 23, 2006	Mount Lemmon	Mount Lemmon Survey	·	810 m	MPC; JPL
815572	2010 DA_{76}	—	February 18, 2010	Kitt Peak	Spacewatch	·	2.0 km	MPC; JPL
815573	2010 DU_{104}	—	September 24, 2014	Catalina	CSS	·	2.4 km	MPC; JPL
815574	2010 DS_{107}	—	April 30, 2014	Haleakala	Pan-STARRS 1	·	770 m	MPC; JPL
815575	2010 DK_{110}	—	February 16, 2010	Mount Lemmon	Mount Lemmon Survey	·	1.3 km	MPC; JPL
815576	2010 DO_{110}	—	October 1, 2017	Haleakala	Pan-STARRS 1	·	1.6 km	MPC; JPL
815577	2010 DC_{112}	—	February 17, 2010	Kitt Peak	Spacewatch	·	820 m	MPC; JPL
815578	2010 EH_{30}	—	February 9, 2010	Kitt Peak	Spacewatch	·	1.4 km	MPC; JPL
815579	2010 EL_{31}	—	March 4, 2010	Kitt Peak	Spacewatch	MAS	520 m	MPC; JPL
815580	2010 EN_{34}	—	February 17, 2010	Kitt Peak	Spacewatch	·	570 m	MPC; JPL
815581	2010 EE_{73}	—	March 13, 2010	Mount Lemmon	Mount Lemmon Survey	V	510 m	MPC; JPL
815582	2010 ET_{73}	—	March 14, 2010	Kitt Peak	Spacewatch	NYS	900 m	MPC; JPL
815583	2010 EW_{73}	—	March 14, 2010	Kitt Peak	Spacewatch	·	450 m	MPC; JPL
815584	2010 ER_{77}	—	March 12, 2010	Kitt Peak	Spacewatch	·	880 m	MPC; JPL
815585	2010 EL_{86}	—	March 13, 2010	Mount Lemmon	Mount Lemmon Survey	·	560 m	MPC; JPL
815586	2010 EW_{86}	—	March 13, 2010	Mount Lemmon	Mount Lemmon Survey	H	330 m	MPC; JPL
815587	2010 EC_{95}	—	March 14, 2010	Mount Lemmon	Mount Lemmon Survey	·	680 m	MPC; JPL
815588	2010 EY_{95}	—	March 14, 2010	Mount Lemmon	Mount Lemmon Survey	MAS	500 m	MPC; JPL
815589	2010 EA_{109}	—	March 14, 2010	Kitt Peak	Spacewatch	PHO	820 m	MPC; JPL
815590	2010 EK_{121}	—	March 15, 2010	Kitt Peak	Spacewatch	·	890 m	MPC; JPL
815591	2010 EY_{131}	—	March 15, 2010	Kitt Peak	Spacewatch	·	1.1 km	MPC; JPL
815592	2010 EM_{141}	—	March 12, 2010	Mount Lemmon	Mount Lemmon Survey	·	700 m	MPC; JPL
815593	2010 EL_{184}	—	November 25, 2009	Kitt Peak	Spacewatch	·	1.3 km	MPC; JPL
815594	2010 EM_{190}	—	March 14, 2010	Mount Lemmon	Mount Lemmon Survey	·	1.3 km	MPC; JPL
815595	2010 EO_{190}	—	March 13, 2010	Mount Lemmon	Mount Lemmon Survey	NYS	930 m	MPC; JPL
815596	2010 EF_{191}	—	March 5, 2010	Catalina	CSS	·	1.1 km	MPC; JPL
815597	2010 EP_{191}	—	March 12, 2010	Kitt Peak	Spacewatch	MAS	520 m	MPC; JPL
815598	2010 FM_{3}	—	March 16, 2010	Mount Lemmon	Mount Lemmon Survey	·	910 m	MPC; JPL
815599	2010 FU_{3}	—	March 16, 2010	Mount Lemmon	Mount Lemmon Survey	·	880 m	MPC; JPL
815600	2010 FT_{20}	—	March 18, 2010	Mount Lemmon	Mount Lemmon Survey	·	950 m	MPC; JPL

== 815601–815700 ==
back to top

Designation			Discovery			Properties		Ref
Permanent	Provisional	Named after	Date	Site	Discoverer(s)	Category	Diam.	Ref
815601	2010 FY_{23}	—	March 18, 2010	Mount Lemmon	Mount Lemmon Survey	HNS	800 m	MPC; JPL
815602	2010 FD_{28}	—	March 20, 2010	Mount Lemmon	Mount Lemmon Survey	PHO	500 m	MPC; JPL
815603	2010 FC_{31}	—	March 18, 2010	Kitt Peak	Spacewatch	·	810 m	MPC; JPL
815604	2010 FA_{55}	—	March 21, 2010	Kitt Peak	Spacewatch	·	1.8 km	MPC; JPL
815605	2010 FU_{89}	—	March 19, 2010	Kitt Peak	Spacewatch	H	340 m	MPC; JPL
815606	2010 FD_{92}	—	March 18, 2010	Catalina	CSS	·	1.4 km	MPC; JPL
815607	2010 FD_{100}	—	March 13, 2010	Mount Lemmon	Mount Lemmon Survey	·	700 m	MPC; JPL
815608	2010 FQ_{125}	—	March 4, 2016	Haleakala	Pan-STARRS 1	·	1.0 km	MPC; JPL
815609	2010 FX_{128}	—	March 21, 2010	WISE	WISE	T_{j} (2.98) · EUP	2.6 km	MPC; JPL
815610	2010 FY_{137}	—	September 21, 2017	Haleakala	Pan-STARRS 1	·	1.1 km	MPC; JPL
815611	2010 FK_{138}	—	January 9, 2014	Catalina	CSS	·	1.3 km	MPC; JPL
815612	2010 FD_{139}	—	August 27, 2011	Haleakala	Pan-STARRS 1	·	1.1 km	MPC; JPL
815613	2010 FK_{139}	—	October 22, 2012	Haleakala	Pan-STARRS 1	·	2.2 km	MPC; JPL
815614	2010 FT_{142}	—	March 18, 2010	Kitt Peak	Spacewatch	·	1.5 km	MPC; JPL
815615	2010 FG_{144}	—	March 18, 2010	Kitt Peak	Spacewatch	·	850 m	MPC; JPL
815616	2010 FP_{144}	—	March 20, 2010	Kitt Peak	Spacewatch	·	800 m	MPC; JPL
815617	2010 FW_{145}	—	November 29, 2019	Haleakala	Pan-STARRS 1	·	2.8 km	MPC; JPL
815618	2010 GO_{65}	—	March 18, 2010	Mount Lemmon	Mount Lemmon Survey	·	1.4 km	MPC; JPL
815619	2010 GM_{103}	—	February 2, 2006	Mount Lemmon	Mount Lemmon Survey	·	760 m	MPC; JPL
815620	2010 GO_{114}	—	January 26, 2006	Mount Lemmon	Mount Lemmon Survey	NYS	930 m	MPC; JPL
815621	2010 GT_{114}	—	April 10, 2010	Kitt Peak	Spacewatch	·	930 m	MPC; JPL
815622	2010 GU_{116}	—	April 10, 2010	Mount Lemmon	Mount Lemmon Survey	·	970 m	MPC; JPL
815623	2010 GL_{122}	—	April 12, 2010	Kitt Peak	Spacewatch	·	980 m	MPC; JPL
815624	2010 GL_{130}	—	March 21, 2010	Kitt Peak	Spacewatch	·	1.4 km	MPC; JPL
815625	2010 GU_{132}	—	April 10, 2010	Mount Lemmon	Mount Lemmon Survey	·	470 m	MPC; JPL
815626	2010 GK_{142}	—	April 9, 2010	Kitt Peak	Spacewatch	·	840 m	MPC; JPL
815627	2010 GL_{160}	—	April 9, 2010	Mount Lemmon	Mount Lemmon Survey	·	1.2 km	MPC; JPL
815628	2010 GP_{199}	—	April 14, 2010	Mount Lemmon	Mount Lemmon Survey	·	1.5 km	MPC; JPL
815629	2010 GN_{200}	—	April 9, 2010	Kitt Peak	Spacewatch	·	600 m	MPC; JPL
815630	2010 GX_{200}	—	February 16, 2015	Haleakala	Pan-STARRS 1	·	2.0 km	MPC; JPL
815631	2010 GO_{201}	—	October 19, 2011	Mount Lemmon	Mount Lemmon Survey	·	830 m	MPC; JPL
815632	2010 GL_{202}	—	April 10, 2010	Mount Lemmon	Mount Lemmon Survey	·	1.5 km	MPC; JPL
815633	2010 GT_{202}	—	July 19, 2015	Haleakala	Pan-STARRS 1	PHO	640 m	MPC; JPL
815634	2010 GD_{203}	—	September 23, 2015	Haleakala	Pan-STARRS 1	·	960 m	MPC; JPL
815635	2010 GL_{205}	—	May 21, 2014	Haleakala	Pan-STARRS 1	MAS	480 m	MPC; JPL
815636	2010 GN_{205}	—	January 2, 2017	Haleakala	Pan-STARRS 1	·	720 m	MPC; JPL
815637	2010 GP_{205}	—	August 21, 2015	Haleakala	Pan-STARRS 1	·	1.0 km	MPC; JPL
815638	2010 GK_{208}	—	April 7, 2010	Mount Lemmon	Mount Lemmon Survey	MAS	470 m	MPC; JPL
815639	2010 GJ_{209}	—	April 14, 2010	Kitt Peak	Spacewatch	TIR	2.0 km	MPC; JPL
815640	2010 GK_{209}	—	April 9, 2010	Kitt Peak	Spacewatch	·	1.1 km	MPC; JPL
815641	2010 GA_{211}	—	April 11, 2010	Mount Lemmon	Mount Lemmon Survey	·	670 m	MPC; JPL
815642	2010 GW_{211}	—	April 9, 2010	Kitt Peak	Spacewatch	·	910 m	MPC; JPL
815643	2010 GY_{211}	—	April 15, 2010	Kitt Peak	Spacewatch	·	840 m	MPC; JPL
815644	2010 GU_{212}	—	April 9, 2010	Kitt Peak	Spacewatch	·	760 m	MPC; JPL
815645	2010 GV_{212}	—	April 10, 2010	Kitt Peak	Spacewatch	·	970 m	MPC; JPL
815646	2010 GG_{213}	—	April 10, 2016	Haleakala	Pan-STARRS 1	THB	1.7 km	MPC; JPL
815647	2010 HW_{121}	—	May 5, 2014	Haleakala	Pan-STARRS 1	·	1.5 km	MPC; JPL
815648	2010 HK_{123}	—	May 4, 2017	Haleakala	Pan-STARRS 1	(895)	3.1 km	MPC; JPL
815649	2010 HM_{138}	—	April 30, 2010	WISE	WISE	·	1.7 km	MPC; JPL
815650	2010 HO_{139}	—	January 2, 2017	Haleakala	Pan-STARRS 1	·	850 m	MPC; JPL
815651	2010 JU_{32}	—	May 6, 2010	Mount Lemmon	Mount Lemmon Survey	·	1.4 km	MPC; JPL
815652	2010 JU_{72}	—	April 10, 2010	Mount Lemmon	Mount Lemmon Survey	·	1.7 km	MPC; JPL
815653	2010 JJ_{79}	—	December 31, 2008	Mount Lemmon	Mount Lemmon Survey	·	1 km	MPC; JPL
815654	2010 JP_{82}	—	May 11, 2010	Mount Lemmon	Mount Lemmon Survey	·	2.4 km	MPC; JPL
815655	2010 JW_{120}	—	May 12, 2010	Kitt Peak	Spacewatch	·	800 m	MPC; JPL
815656	2010 JX_{120}	—	May 12, 2010	Kitt Peak	Spacewatch	·	920 m	MPC; JPL
815657	2010 JH_{154}	—	May 5, 2010	Mount Lemmon	Mount Lemmon Survey	·	940 m	MPC; JPL
815658	2010 JB_{156}	—	May 11, 2010	Mount Lemmon	Mount Lemmon Survey	·	1.9 km	MPC; JPL
815659	2010 JG_{158}	—	April 9, 2010	Kitt Peak	Spacewatch	·	1.0 km	MPC; JPL
815660	2010 JG_{159}	—	April 11, 2010	Mount Lemmon	Mount Lemmon Survey	·	780 m	MPC; JPL
815661	2010 JM_{164}	—	April 8, 2010	Kitt Peak	Spacewatch	·	740 m	MPC; JPL
815662	2010 JR_{167}	—	May 11, 2010	Mount Lemmon	Mount Lemmon Survey	·	960 m	MPC; JPL
815663	2010 JG_{170}	—	May 12, 2010	Mount Lemmon	Mount Lemmon Survey	·	1 km	MPC; JPL
815664	2010 JU_{175}	—	April 8, 2010	Kitt Peak	Spacewatch	(5)	870 m	MPC; JPL
815665	2010 JY_{176}	—	May 11, 2010	Mount Lemmon	Mount Lemmon Survey	·	1.7 km	MPC; JPL
815666	2010 JL_{178}	—	May 14, 2010	Palomar	Palomar Transient Factory	·	2.6 km	MPC; JPL
815667	2010 JY_{179}	—	September 27, 2016	Mount Lemmon	Mount Lemmon Survey	·	2.1 km	MPC; JPL
815668	2010 JN_{186}	—	February 5, 2016	Haleakala	Pan-STARRS 1	·	2.0 km	MPC; JPL
815669	2010 JN_{190}	—	March 13, 2016	Mount Lemmon	Mount Lemmon Survey	·	2.2 km	MPC; JPL
815670	2010 JY_{190}	—	November 24, 2011	Mount Lemmon	Mount Lemmon Survey	·	1.8 km	MPC; JPL
815671	2010 JR_{194}	—	May 9, 2010	WISE	WISE	·	840 m	MPC; JPL
815672	2010 JV_{204}	—	April 22, 2009	Mount Lemmon	Mount Lemmon Survey	EMA	2.2 km	MPC; JPL
815673	2010 JX_{211}	—	September 6, 2016	Haleakala	Pan-STARRS 1	·	1.4 km	MPC; JPL
815674	2010 JK_{213}	—	April 30, 2014	Haleakala	Pan-STARRS 1	·	800 m	MPC; JPL
815675	2010 JQ_{214}	—	January 2, 2017	Haleakala	Pan-STARRS 1	H	310 m	MPC; JPL
815676	2010 JR_{214}	—	May 11, 2010	Mount Lemmon	Mount Lemmon Survey	NYS	890 m	MPC; JPL
815677	2010 KT_{138}	—	May 20, 2015	Cerro Tololo	DECam	·	1.0 km	MPC; JPL
815678	2010 KR_{139}	—	March 24, 2014	Haleakala	Pan-STARRS 1	·	2.1 km	MPC; JPL
815679	2010 KE_{149}	—	July 30, 2017	Haleakala	Pan-STARRS 1	·	530 m	MPC; JPL
815680	2010 KJ_{156}	—	November 21, 2015	Mount Lemmon	Mount Lemmon Survey	·	1.4 km	MPC; JPL
815681	2010 KT_{157}	—	October 21, 2011	Kitt Peak	Spacewatch	·	920 m	MPC; JPL
815682	2010 KB_{158}	—	April 11, 2018	Mount Lemmon	Mount Lemmon Survey	H	470 m	MPC; JPL
815683	2010 KS_{160}	—	October 20, 2007	Kitt Peak	Spacewatch	·	870 m	MPC; JPL
815684	2010 LB_{15}	—	May 11, 2010	Mount Lemmon	Mount Lemmon Survey	·	630 m	MPC; JPL
815685	2010 LV_{107}	—	May 14, 2010	Mount Lemmon	Mount Lemmon Survey	PHO	620 m	MPC; JPL
815686	2010 LL_{158}	—	June 13, 2010	Mount Lemmon	Mount Lemmon Survey	H	430 m	MPC; JPL
815687	2010 MK	—	June 16, 2010	Mount Lemmon	Mount Lemmon Survey	·	830 m	MPC; JPL
815688	2010 MK_{2}	—	June 5, 2010	Kitt Peak	Spacewatch	PHO	540 m	MPC; JPL
815689	2010 MB_{134}	—	June 25, 2010	WISE	WISE	T_{j} (2.98)	2.3 km	MPC; JPL
815690	2010 ME_{150}	—	June 21, 2010	Mount Lemmon	Mount Lemmon Survey	·	760 m	MPC; JPL
815691	2010 NY_{27}	—	July 7, 2010	WISE	WISE	·	1.9 km	MPC; JPL
815692	2010 NO_{52}	—	July 10, 2010	WISE	WISE	3:2 · SHU	4.8 km	MPC; JPL
815693	2010 NB_{121}	—	January 19, 2012	Haleakala	Pan-STARRS 1	T_{j} (2.97)	2.6 km	MPC; JPL
815694	2010 NK_{142}	—	April 18, 2015	Haleakala	Pan-STARRS 1	·	1.3 km	MPC; JPL
815695	2010 NP_{146}	—	November 24, 2011	Haleakala	Pan-STARRS 1	·	2.8 km	MPC; JPL
815696	2010 NP_{148}	—	November 23, 2011	Mount Lemmon	Mount Lemmon Survey	·	2.0 km	MPC; JPL
815697	2010 OK_{137}	—	December 10, 2005	Kitt Peak	Spacewatch	·	2.8 km	MPC; JPL
815698	2010 OU_{137}	—	July 19, 2015	Haleakala	Pan-STARRS 1	TIR	1.5 km	MPC; JPL
815699	2010 PJ_{23}	—	August 8, 2010	Dauban	C. Rinner, Kugel, F.	THB	2.4 km	MPC; JPL
815700	2010 PU_{23}	—	December 18, 2007	Mount Lemmon	Mount Lemmon Survey	·	1.2 km	MPC; JPL

== 815701–815800 ==
back to top

Designation			Discovery			Properties		Ref
Permanent	Provisional	Named after	Date	Site	Discoverer(s)	Category	Diam.	Ref
815701	2010 PG_{63}	—	August 8, 2010	Bisei	BATTeRS	H	430 m	MPC; JPL
815702	2010 PX_{63}	—	September 29, 2005	Kitt Peak	Spacewatch	·	1.7 km	MPC; JPL
815703	2010 PU_{64}	—	August 10, 2010	Kitt Peak	Spacewatch	·	460 m	MPC; JPL
815704	2010 PL_{85}	—	August 4, 2010	WISE	WISE	·	1.5 km	MPC; JPL
815705	2010 PO_{88}	—	August 12, 2010	Kitt Peak	Spacewatch	HOF	2.2 km	MPC; JPL
815706	2010 PK_{89}	—	August 12, 2010	Kitt Peak	Spacewatch	·	1.5 km	MPC; JPL
815707	2010 PW_{89}	—	August 14, 2010	Kitt Peak	Spacewatch	·	1.5 km	MPC; JPL
815708	2010 PK_{90}	—	August 13, 2010	Kitt Peak	Spacewatch	·	1.3 km	MPC; JPL
815709	2010 PB_{93}	—	August 10, 2010	Kitt Peak	Spacewatch	·	1.8 km	MPC; JPL
815710	2010 RN_{1}	—	September 1, 2010	Mount Lemmon	Mount Lemmon Survey	·	850 m	MPC; JPL
815711	2010 RD_{5}	—	August 10, 2010	Kitt Peak	Spacewatch	·	1.8 km	MPC; JPL
815712	2010 RC_{7}	—	September 2, 2010	Mount Lemmon	Mount Lemmon Survey	·	2.0 km	MPC; JPL
815713	2010 RR_{10}	—	September 2, 2010	Mount Lemmon	Mount Lemmon Survey	·	2.1 km	MPC; JPL
815714	2010 RJ_{13}	—	August 13, 2010	Kitt Peak	Spacewatch	·	550 m	MPC; JPL
815715	2010 RX_{28}	—	September 4, 2010	Mount Lemmon	Mount Lemmon Survey	·	1.0 km	MPC; JPL
815716	2010 RM_{32}	—	September 1, 2010	Mount Lemmon	Mount Lemmon Survey	·	560 m	MPC; JPL
815717	2010 RD_{34}	—	September 2, 2010	Mount Lemmon	Mount Lemmon Survey	PHO	780 m	MPC; JPL
815718	2010 RK_{39}	—	September 5, 2010	Rehoboth	L. A. Molnar, A. Vanden Heuvel	NYS	1 km	MPC; JPL
815719	2010 RS_{42}	—	September 3, 2010	Piszkés-tető	K. Sárneczky, Z. Kuli	·	880 m	MPC; JPL
815720	2010 RT_{48}	—	August 14, 2006	Siding Spring	SSS	NYS	950 m	MPC; JPL
815721	2010 RG_{50}	—	September 4, 2010	Kitt Peak	Spacewatch	·	1.8 km	MPC; JPL
815722	2010 RY_{53}	—	September 3, 2010	Mount Lemmon	Mount Lemmon Survey	·	960 m	MPC; JPL
815723	2010 RX_{54}	—	September 5, 2010	La Sagra	OAM	·	990 m	MPC; JPL
815724	2010 RO_{70}	—	August 10, 2010	Kitt Peak	Spacewatch	·	450 m	MPC; JPL
815725	2010 RD_{77}	—	September 11, 2010	Mount Lemmon	Mount Lemmon Survey	·	460 m	MPC; JPL
815726	2010 RZ_{78}	—	July 24, 2003	Palomar	NEAT	·	520 m	MPC; JPL
815727	2010 RX_{88}	—	September 5, 2010	Mount Lemmon	Mount Lemmon Survey	·	1.4 km	MPC; JPL
815728	2010 RY_{89}	—	September 2, 2010	Mount Lemmon	Mount Lemmon Survey	NYS	820 m	MPC; JPL
815729	2010 RJ_{94}	—	September 12, 2010	Mount Lemmon	Mount Lemmon Survey	·	1.4 km	MPC; JPL
815730	2010 RL_{94}	—	November 4, 2007	Kitt Peak	Spacewatch	V	470 m	MPC; JPL
815731	2010 RN_{97}	—	February 20, 2009	Mount Lemmon	Mount Lemmon Survey	·	940 m	MPC; JPL
815732	2010 RY_{97}	—	March 9, 2007	Mount Lemmon	Mount Lemmon Survey	TIR	2.0 km	MPC; JPL
815733	2010 RQ_{99}	—	September 10, 2010	Kitt Peak	Spacewatch	EUN	1.1 km	MPC; JPL
815734	2010 RO_{103}	—	September 10, 2010	Kitt Peak	Spacewatch	3:2	3.7 km	MPC; JPL
815735	2010 RX_{103}	—	September 10, 2010	Kitt Peak	Spacewatch	·	500 m	MPC; JPL
815736	2010 RJ_{104}	—	September 10, 2010	Kitt Peak	Spacewatch	·	1.6 km	MPC; JPL
815737	2010 RT_{107}	—	March 21, 2009	Kitt Peak	Spacewatch	·	1.3 km	MPC; JPL
815738	2010 RU_{108}	—	September 11, 2010	Kitt Peak	Spacewatch	·	1.4 km	MPC; JPL
815739	2010 RH_{109}	—	September 11, 2010	Catalina	CSS	·	490 m	MPC; JPL
815740	2010 RE_{114}	—	September 11, 2010	Kitt Peak	Spacewatch	·	690 m	MPC; JPL
815741	2010 RY_{114}	—	September 11, 2010	Kitt Peak	Spacewatch	V	470 m	MPC; JPL
815742	2010 RL_{117}	—	September 11, 2010	Kitt Peak	Spacewatch	·	1.1 km	MPC; JPL
815743	2010 RU_{123}	—	September 10, 2010	Mount Lemmon	Mount Lemmon Survey	·	2.3 km	MPC; JPL
815744	2010 RL_{131}	—	September 10, 2010	Mount Lemmon	Mount Lemmon Survey	·	680 m	MPC; JPL
815745	2010 RE_{135}	—	September 15, 2010	Mount Lemmon	Mount Lemmon Survey	·	2.2 km	MPC; JPL
815746	2010 RV_{136}	—	September 2, 2010	Mount Lemmon	Mount Lemmon Survey	·	850 m	MPC; JPL
815747	2010 RG_{141}	—	September 30, 2006	Mount Lemmon	Mount Lemmon Survey	·	1.3 km	MPC; JPL
815748	2010 RF_{145}	—	September 14, 2010	Kitt Peak	Spacewatch	AGN	800 m	MPC; JPL
815749	2010 RT_{145}	—	August 19, 2006	Kitt Peak	Spacewatch	MAS	530 m	MPC; JPL
815750	2010 RA_{150}	—	September 15, 2010	Kitt Peak	Spacewatch	HOF	2.1 km	MPC; JPL
815751	2010 RN_{153}	—	September 15, 2010	Kitt Peak	Spacewatch	·	2.2 km	MPC; JPL
815752	2010 RB_{158}	—	September 1, 2010	Mount Lemmon	Mount Lemmon Survey	·	2.1 km	MPC; JPL
815753	2010 RN_{159}	—	August 13, 2010	Kitt Peak	Spacewatch	EUN	960 m	MPC; JPL
815754	2010 RK_{160}	—	September 2, 2010	Mount Lemmon	Mount Lemmon Survey	·	570 m	MPC; JPL
815755	2010 RF_{161}	—	March 11, 2005	Kitt Peak	Spacewatch	·	1.1 km	MPC; JPL
815756	2010 RE_{169}	—	September 2, 2010	Mount Lemmon	Mount Lemmon Survey	·	1.5 km	MPC; JPL
815757	2010 RM_{178}	—	August 30, 2014	Kitt Peak	Spacewatch	·	940 m	MPC; JPL
815758	2010 RT_{178}	—	September 7, 2010	Piszkés-tető	K. Sárneczky, Z. Kuli	·	760 m	MPC; JPL
815759	2010 RK_{179}	—	June 13, 2010	Mount Lemmon	Mount Lemmon Survey	·	930 m	MPC; JPL
815760	2010 RX_{179}	—	September 15, 2010	Mount Lemmon	Mount Lemmon Survey	·	940 m	MPC; JPL
815761	2010 RH_{189}	—	September 4, 2010	Mount Lemmon	Mount Lemmon Survey	·	1.6 km	MPC; JPL
815762	2010 RF_{194}	—	August 10, 2016	Haleakala	Pan-STARRS 1	·	2.3 km	MPC; JPL
815763	2010 RH_{195}	—	May 8, 2013	Haleakala	Pan-STARRS 1	·	750 m	MPC; JPL
815764	2010 RM_{195}	—	September 10, 2010	Catalina	CSS	·	940 m	MPC; JPL
815765	2010 RZ_{199}	—	May 20, 2015	Cerro Tololo	DECam	·	2.5 km	MPC; JPL
815766	2010 RJ_{201}	—	January 5, 2016	Haleakala	Pan-STARRS 1	PHO	760 m	MPC; JPL
815767	2010 RX_{203}	—	August 20, 2014	Haleakala	Pan-STARRS 1	·	860 m	MPC; JPL
815768	2010 RL_{204}	—	July 2, 2014	Haleakala	Pan-STARRS 1	(5)	1.0 km	MPC; JPL
815769	2010 RK_{205}	—	September 10, 2010	Kitt Peak	Spacewatch	(1547)	820 m	MPC; JPL
815770	2010 RS_{205}	—	September 11, 2010	Kitt Peak	Spacewatch	(1338) (FLO)	450 m	MPC; JPL
815771	2010 RN_{206}	—	September 15, 2010	Mount Lemmon	Mount Lemmon Survey	·	450 m	MPC; JPL
815772	2010 RZ_{208}	—	September 11, 2010	Kitt Peak	Spacewatch	·	2.5 km	MPC; JPL
815773	2010 RX_{212}	—	September 4, 2010	Mount Lemmon	Mount Lemmon Survey	H	290 m	MPC; JPL
815774	2010 RQ_{213}	—	September 11, 2010	Mount Lemmon	Mount Lemmon Survey	·	460 m	MPC; JPL
815775	2010 RQ_{219}	—	September 5, 2010	Mount Lemmon	Mount Lemmon Survey	PHO	680 m	MPC; JPL
815776	2010 RE_{225}	—	September 6, 2010	Mount Lemmon	Mount Lemmon Survey	·	830 m	MPC; JPL
815777	2010 RK_{229}	—	April 4, 2019	Mount Lemmon	Mount Lemmon Survey	·	2.3 km	MPC; JPL
815778	2010 SW_{1}	—	September 16, 2010	Mount Lemmon	Mount Lemmon Survey	·	1.2 km	MPC; JPL
815779	2010 SW_{4}	—	September 16, 2010	Mount Lemmon	Mount Lemmon Survey	·	1.4 km	MPC; JPL
815780	2010 SD_{7}	—	September 4, 2010	Mount Lemmon	Mount Lemmon Survey	EOS	1.2 km	MPC; JPL
815781	2010 SW_{10}	—	September 18, 2010	Kitt Peak	Spacewatch	H	470 m	MPC; JPL
815782	2010 SK_{12}	—	August 16, 2006	Siding Spring	SSS	·	1.1 km	MPC; JPL
815783	2010 SO_{13}	—	September 27, 2010	Kitt Peak	Spacewatch	·	1.4 km	MPC; JPL
815784	2010 SB_{24}	—	September 7, 2010	La Sagra	OAM	·	590 m	MPC; JPL
815785	2010 SA_{32}	—	December 18, 2003	Kitt Peak	Spacewatch	NYS	780 m	MPC; JPL
815786	2010 SO_{44}	—	September 17, 2010	Mount Lemmon	Mount Lemmon Survey	EOS	1.3 km	MPC; JPL
815787	2010 SB_{46}	—	July 10, 2010	WISE	WISE	3:2	4.5 km	MPC; JPL
815788	2010 SB_{47}	—	September 19, 2010	Kitt Peak	Spacewatch	·	840 m	MPC; JPL
815789	2010 SF_{47}	—	September 18, 2010	Mount Lemmon	Mount Lemmon Survey	·	1.6 km	MPC; JPL
815790	2010 SK_{49}	—	September 18, 2010	Mount Lemmon	Mount Lemmon Survey	·	2.5 km	MPC; JPL
815791	2010 SW_{54}	—	September 29, 2010	Mount Lemmon	Mount Lemmon Survey	·	2.2 km	MPC; JPL
815792	2010 SE_{55}	—	September 29, 2010	Mount Lemmon	Mount Lemmon Survey	·	430 m	MPC; JPL
815793	2010 SZ_{55}	—	September 17, 2010	Mount Lemmon	Mount Lemmon Survey	EOS	1.2 km	MPC; JPL
815794	2010 SJ_{62}	—	September 30, 2010	Mount Lemmon	Mount Lemmon Survey	·	2.0 km	MPC; JPL
815795	2010 SS_{62}	—	September 30, 2010	Mount Lemmon	Mount Lemmon Survey	·	2.2 km	MPC; JPL
815796	2010 ST_{65}	—	September 17, 2010	Mount Lemmon	Mount Lemmon Survey	·	1.8 km	MPC; JPL
815797	2010 TZ_{10}	—	October 1, 2010	Kitt Peak	Spacewatch	V	480 m	MPC; JPL
815798	2010 TS_{12}	—	September 19, 2010	Kitt Peak	Spacewatch	·	1.3 km	MPC; JPL
815799	2010 TS_{22}	—	October 1, 2010	Kitt Peak	Spacewatch	NYS	700 m	MPC; JPL
815800	2010 TZ_{23}	—	September 17, 2010	Kitt Peak	Spacewatch	·	530 m	MPC; JPL

== 815801–815900 ==
back to top

Designation			Discovery			Properties		Ref
Permanent	Provisional	Named after	Date	Site	Discoverer(s)	Category	Diam.	Ref
815801	2010 TW_{24}	—	October 1, 2010	Mount Lemmon	Mount Lemmon Survey	·	1.6 km	MPC; JPL
815802	2010 TV_{25}	—	September 15, 2010	Mount Lemmon	Mount Lemmon Survey	·	500 m	MPC; JPL
815803	2010 TW_{27}	—	September 10, 2010	Mount Lemmon	Mount Lemmon Survey	·	2.0 km	MPC; JPL
815804	2010 TV_{28}	—	August 6, 2010	Kitt Peak	Spacewatch	·	1.1 km	MPC; JPL
815805	2010 TB_{29}	—	October 2, 2010	Kitt Peak	Spacewatch	NYS	590 m	MPC; JPL
815806	2010 TX_{29}	—	October 2, 2010	Kitt Peak	Spacewatch	AGN	810 m	MPC; JPL
815807	2010 TK_{32}	—	September 14, 2010	Kitt Peak	Spacewatch	·	450 m	MPC; JPL
815808	2010 TP_{32}	—	September 14, 2010	Kitt Peak	Spacewatch	·	1.0 km	MPC; JPL
815809	2010 TQ_{53}	—	October 8, 2010	Kitt Peak	Spacewatch	·	430 m	MPC; JPL
815810	2010 TT_{54}	—	February 25, 2009	Catalina	CSS	H	360 m	MPC; JPL
815811 Cześstawikowski	2010 TX_{57}	Cześstawikowski	October 5, 2010	Moletai	K. Černis	TIR	2.5 km	MPC; JPL
815812	2010 TV_{63}	—	September 8, 2010	Kitt Peak	Spacewatch	·	510 m	MPC; JPL
815813	2010 TE_{73}	—	October 8, 2010	Kitt Peak	Spacewatch	·	480 m	MPC; JPL
815814	2010 TL_{80}	—	September 17, 2010	Kitt Peak	Spacewatch	·	850 m	MPC; JPL
815815	2010 TM_{83}	—	October 9, 2010	Mount Lemmon	Mount Lemmon Survey	H	450 m	MPC; JPL
815816	2010 TF_{85}	—	September 29, 2010	Mount Lemmon	Mount Lemmon Survey	·	530 m	MPC; JPL
815817	2010 TO_{86}	—	September 30, 2010	Mount Lemmon	Mount Lemmon Survey	THM	1.7 km	MPC; JPL
815818	2010 TM_{95}	—	September 12, 2010	Kitt Peak	Spacewatch	·	1.2 km	MPC; JPL
815819	2010 TX_{104}	—	September 18, 2010	Kitt Peak	Spacewatch	PHO	820 m	MPC; JPL
815820	2010 TD_{107}	—	September 24, 2005	Kitt Peak	Spacewatch	KOR	1.3 km	MPC; JPL
815821	2010 TD_{108}	—	October 9, 2010	Kitt Peak	Spacewatch	H	310 m	MPC; JPL
815822	2010 TF_{113}	—	September 29, 2010	Kitt Peak	Spacewatch	·	860 m	MPC; JPL
815823	2010 TJ_{116}	—	September 29, 2010	Kitt Peak	Spacewatch	CLA	1.3 km	MPC; JPL
815824	2010 TM_{122}	—	October 10, 2010	Mount Lemmon	Mount Lemmon Survey	·	1.0 km	MPC; JPL
815825	2010 TX_{130}	—	October 11, 2010	Mount Lemmon	Mount Lemmon Survey	·	540 m	MPC; JPL
815826	2010 TR_{146}	—	March 28, 2009	Mount Lemmon	Mount Lemmon Survey	H	370 m	MPC; JPL
815827	2010 TB_{149}	—	October 12, 2010	Kitt Peak	Spacewatch	·	2.1 km	MPC; JPL
815828	2010 TT_{152}	—	September 3, 2010	Mount Lemmon	Mount Lemmon Survey	·	500 m	MPC; JPL
815829	2010 TW_{162}	—	October 11, 2010	Bergisch Gladbach	W. Bickel	·	740 m	MPC; JPL
815830	2010 TL_{175}	—	October 7, 2010	Catalina	CSS	H	400 m	MPC; JPL
815831	2010 TV_{178}	—	September 12, 2010	Kitt Peak	Spacewatch	·	670 m	MPC; JPL
815832	2010 TZ_{182}	—	October 1, 2010	Mount Lemmon	Mount Lemmon Survey	·	1.2 km	MPC; JPL
815833	2010 TA_{186}	—	September 10, 2010	Kitt Peak	Spacewatch	·	2.4 km	MPC; JPL
815834	2010 TN_{186}	—	September 10, 2010	Mount Lemmon	Mount Lemmon Survey	·	460 m	MPC; JPL
815835	2010 TV_{186}	—	October 29, 2010	Catalina	CSS	·	1.3 km	MPC; JPL
815836	2010 TY_{192}	—	October 13, 2010	Mount Lemmon	Mount Lemmon Survey	H	360 m	MPC; JPL
815837	2010 TG_{195}	—	July 13, 2010	WISE	WISE	·	1.6 km	MPC; JPL
815838	2010 TV_{198}	—	October 2, 2010	Mount Lemmon	Mount Lemmon Survey	·	580 m	MPC; JPL
815839	2010 TO_{203}	—	July 15, 2013	Haleakala	Pan-STARRS 1	·	540 m	MPC; JPL
815840	2010 TP_{206}	—	October 9, 2010	Kitt Peak	Spacewatch	H	340 m	MPC; JPL
815841	2010 TX_{212}	—	October 10, 2010	Kitt Peak	Spacewatch	·	2.5 km	MPC; JPL
815842	2010 TL_{215}	—	October 13, 2010	Mount Lemmon	Mount Lemmon Survey	·	1.7 km	MPC; JPL
815843	2010 TS_{215}	—	October 2, 2010	Kitt Peak	Spacewatch	·	1.7 km	MPC; JPL
815844	2010 TX_{215}	—	September 4, 2010	Kitt Peak	Spacewatch	·	680 m	MPC; JPL
815845	2010 TT_{217}	—	October 13, 2010	Mount Lemmon	Mount Lemmon Survey	·	1.7 km	MPC; JPL
815846	2010 TB_{218}	—	October 2, 2010	Kitt Peak	Spacewatch	·	410 m	MPC; JPL
815847	2010 TT_{222}	—	October 2, 2010	Mount Lemmon	Mount Lemmon Survey	·	2.4 km	MPC; JPL
815848	2010 TK_{231}	—	October 3, 2010	Kitt Peak	Spacewatch	·	1.5 km	MPC; JPL
815849	2010 TZ_{231}	—	October 2, 2010	Mount Lemmon	Mount Lemmon Survey	HYG	1.9 km	MPC; JPL
815850	2010 TD_{232}	—	October 13, 2010	Mount Lemmon	Mount Lemmon Survey	·	2.2 km	MPC; JPL
815851	2010 TF_{234}	—	October 14, 2010	Mount Lemmon	Mount Lemmon Survey	·	760 m	MPC; JPL
815852	2010 UT_{1}	—	October 17, 2010	Mount Lemmon	Mount Lemmon Survey	HYG	1.9 km	MPC; JPL
815853	2010 UX_{5}	—	October 17, 2010	Kitt Peak	Spacewatch	·	1.3 km	MPC; JPL
815854	2010 UK_{6}	—	October 17, 2010	Mount Lemmon	Mount Lemmon Survey	H	410 m	MPC; JPL
815855	2010 US_{15}	—	November 9, 1999	Socorro	LINEAR	·	2.3 km	MPC; JPL
815856	2010 UL_{18}	—	October 28, 2010	Mount Lemmon	Mount Lemmon Survey	·	780 m	MPC; JPL
815857	2010 US_{28}	—	October 28, 2010	Mount Lemmon	Mount Lemmon Survey	·	510 m	MPC; JPL
815858	2010 UC_{33}	—	October 29, 2010	Mount Lemmon	Mount Lemmon Survey	·	2.5 km	MPC; JPL
815859	2010 UJ_{37}	—	December 25, 2005	Kitt Peak	Spacewatch	·	1.8 km	MPC; JPL
815860	2010 UY_{39}	—	October 12, 2010	Mount Lemmon	Mount Lemmon Survey	H	360 m	MPC; JPL
815861	2010 UH_{42}	—	October 30, 2010	Mount Lemmon	Mount Lemmon Survey	·	750 m	MPC; JPL
815862	2010 UP_{46}	—	October 13, 2010	Catalina	CSS	3:2	4.4 km	MPC; JPL
815863	2010 UO_{47}	—	October 23, 2006	Kitt Peak	Spacewatch	·	660 m	MPC; JPL
815864	2010 UX_{63}	—	October 30, 2010	Piszkés-tető	K. Sárneczky, Z. Kuli	·	770 m	MPC; JPL
815865	2010 UK_{73}	—	October 29, 2010	Mount Lemmon	Mount Lemmon Survey	H	490 m	MPC; JPL
815866	2010 UP_{80}	—	December 4, 2005	Kitt Peak	Spacewatch	·	2.0 km	MPC; JPL
815867	2010 UJ_{84}	—	October 30, 2010	Mount Lemmon	Mount Lemmon Survey	CLA	1.1 km	MPC; JPL
815868	2010 UN_{92}	—	August 19, 2006	Kitt Peak	Spacewatch	·	890 m	MPC; JPL
815869	2010 US_{100}	—	October 30, 2010	Mount Lemmon	Mount Lemmon Survey	H	410 m	MPC; JPL
815870	2010 UL_{111}	—	October 31, 2010	Mount Lemmon	Mount Lemmon Survey	·	1.8 km	MPC; JPL
815871	2010 UD_{113}	—	October 2, 2010	Mount Lemmon	Mount Lemmon Survey	·	1.1 km	MPC; JPL
815872	2010 UT_{116}	—	January 30, 2016	Mount Lemmon	Mount Lemmon Survey	·	1.0 km	MPC; JPL
815873	2010 UV_{116}	—	April 10, 2013	Haleakala	Pan-STARRS 1	·	780 m	MPC; JPL
815874	2010 UV_{118}	—	October 28, 2010	Mount Lemmon	Mount Lemmon Survey	MAS	520 m	MPC; JPL
815875	2010 UC_{121}	—	October 17, 2010	Mount Lemmon	Mount Lemmon Survey	·	2.5 km	MPC; JPL
815876	2010 UT_{122}	—	October 17, 2010	Mount Lemmon	Mount Lemmon Survey	·	570 m	MPC; JPL
815877	2010 UX_{125}	—	October 29, 2010	Mount Lemmon	Mount Lemmon Survey	·	500 m	MPC; JPL
815878	2010 UR_{126}	—	October 31, 2010	Kitt Peak	Spacewatch	·	860 m	MPC; JPL
815879	2010 UP_{132}	—	October 28, 2010	Mount Lemmon	Mount Lemmon Survey	·	2.2 km	MPC; JPL
815880	2010 UW_{133}	—	October 31, 2010	Mount Lemmon	Mount Lemmon Survey	·	440 m	MPC; JPL
815881	2010 UZ_{135}	—	October 30, 2010	Mount Lemmon	Mount Lemmon Survey	·	2.6 km	MPC; JPL
815882	2010 VB_{3}	—	November 1, 2010	Mount Lemmon	Mount Lemmon Survey	·	2.3 km	MPC; JPL
815883	2010 VJ_{3}	—	November 1, 2010	Mount Lemmon	Mount Lemmon Survey	·	460 m	MPC; JPL
815884	2010 VR_{4}	—	November 1, 2010	Mount Lemmon	Mount Lemmon Survey	·	510 m	MPC; JPL
815885	2010 VS_{5}	—	November 1, 2010	Mount Lemmon	Mount Lemmon Survey	·	480 m	MPC; JPL
815886	2010 VH_{11}	—	September 18, 2010	Mount Lemmon	Mount Lemmon Survey	·	750 m	MPC; JPL
815887	2010 VK_{11}	—	October 17, 2010	Mount Lemmon	Mount Lemmon Survey	H	330 m	MPC; JPL
815888	2010 VV_{15}	—	October 12, 2010	Mount Lemmon	Mount Lemmon Survey	·	1.9 km	MPC; JPL
815889	2010 VM_{16}	—	October 11, 2010	Mount Lemmon	Mount Lemmon Survey	TIR	1.6 km	MPC; JPL
815890	2010 VS_{22}	—	November 1, 2010	Kitt Peak	Spacewatch	(5)	730 m	MPC; JPL
815891	2010 VF_{24}	—	November 1, 2010	Kitt Peak	Spacewatch	·	600 m	MPC; JPL
815892	2010 VD_{25}	—	September 5, 2010	Mount Lemmon	Mount Lemmon Survey	·	730 m	MPC; JPL
815893	2010 VO_{25}	—	November 1, 2010	Kitt Peak	Spacewatch	·	1.5 km	MPC; JPL
815894	2010 VQ_{37}	—	September 30, 2010	Mount Lemmon	Mount Lemmon Survey	PHO	750 m	MPC; JPL
815895	2010 VA_{52}	—	October 9, 2010	Kitt Peak	Spacewatch	H	380 m	MPC; JPL
815896	2010 VZ_{52}	—	November 3, 2010	Mount Lemmon	Mount Lemmon Survey	·	870 m	MPC; JPL
815897	2010 VO_{57}	—	October 2, 2010	Mount Lemmon	Mount Lemmon Survey	H	470 m	MPC; JPL
815898	2010 VW_{58}	—	October 30, 2010	Catalina	CSS	H	450 m	MPC; JPL
815899	2010 VD_{60}	—	November 4, 2010	Mount Lemmon	Mount Lemmon Survey	·	2.0 km	MPC; JPL
815900	2010 VR_{67}	—	November 3, 2010	Kitt Peak	Spacewatch	H	380 m	MPC; JPL

== 815901–816000 ==
back to top

Designation			Discovery			Properties		Ref
Permanent	Provisional	Named after	Date	Site	Discoverer(s)	Category	Diam.	Ref
815901	2010 VY_{75}	—	October 11, 2010	Mount Lemmon	Mount Lemmon Survey	H	440 m	MPC; JPL
815902	2010 VB_{88}	—	November 6, 2010	Kitt Peak	Spacewatch	·	450 m	MPC; JPL
815903	2010 VE_{88}	—	October 28, 2010	Kitt Peak	Spacewatch	PHO	610 m	MPC; JPL
815904	2010 VR_{88}	—	November 6, 2010	Kitt Peak	Spacewatch	H	460 m	MPC; JPL
815905	2010 VX_{88}	—	November 2, 2010	Kitt Peak	Spacewatch	·	2.7 km	MPC; JPL
815906	2010 VA_{98}	—	October 31, 2010	Mount Lemmon	Mount Lemmon Survey	·	520 m	MPC; JPL
815907	2010 VL_{98}	—	November 9, 2010	Haleakala	Pan-STARRS 1	·	420 m	MPC; JPL
815908	2010 VR_{98}	—	November 10, 2010	Kitt Peak	Spacewatch	H	400 m	MPC; JPL
815909	2010 VB_{103}	—	November 5, 2010	Mount Lemmon	Mount Lemmon Survey	·	1.6 km	MPC; JPL
815910	2010 VD_{103}	—	November 5, 2010	Mount Lemmon	Mount Lemmon Survey	H	420 m	MPC; JPL
815911	2010 VP_{108}	—	November 6, 2010	Mount Lemmon	Mount Lemmon Survey	·	2.2 km	MPC; JPL
815912	2010 VJ_{116}	—	February 9, 2008	Mount Lemmon	Mount Lemmon Survey	·	410 m	MPC; JPL
815913	2010 VY_{116}	—	September 18, 2010	Mount Lemmon	Mount Lemmon Survey	·	2.6 km	MPC; JPL
815914	2010 VH_{118}	—	October 13, 2010	Mount Lemmon	Mount Lemmon Survey	V	450 m	MPC; JPL
815915	2010 VR_{118}	—	September 16, 2003	Kitt Peak	Spacewatch	·	470 m	MPC; JPL
815916	2010 VQ_{124}	—	October 29, 2010	Mount Lemmon	Mount Lemmon Survey	·	2.2 km	MPC; JPL
815917	2010 VS_{129}	—	September 3, 2010	Mount Lemmon	Mount Lemmon Survey	H	500 m	MPC; JPL
815918	2010 VM_{131}	—	September 16, 2010	Catalina	CSS	·	1.4 km	MPC; JPL
815919	2010 VJ_{140}	—	September 11, 2010	Mount Lemmon	Mount Lemmon Survey	EUN	860 m	MPC; JPL
815920	2010 VR_{140}	—	May 17, 2009	Mount Lemmon	Mount Lemmon Survey	H	360 m	MPC; JPL
815921	2010 VB_{143}	—	November 6, 2010	Mount Lemmon	Mount Lemmon Survey	·	1.6 km	MPC; JPL
815922	2010 VP_{152}	—	November 6, 2010	Mount Lemmon	Mount Lemmon Survey	·	1.4 km	MPC; JPL
815923	2010 VV_{166}	—	November 10, 2010	Mount Lemmon	Mount Lemmon Survey	·	2.3 km	MPC; JPL
815924	2010 VW_{168}	—	November 10, 2010	Mount Lemmon	Mount Lemmon Survey	·	1.3 km	MPC; JPL
815925	2010 VZ_{169}	—	October 14, 2010	Mount Lemmon	Mount Lemmon Survey	T_{j} (2.98) · 3:2	3.7 km	MPC; JPL
815926	2010 VL_{188}	—	November 6, 2010	Mount Lemmon	Mount Lemmon Survey	·	560 m	MPC; JPL
815927	2010 VX_{188}	—	November 2, 2010	Kitt Peak	Spacewatch	EUP	3.0 km	MPC; JPL
815928	2010 VZ_{188}	—	November 13, 2010	Mount Lemmon	Mount Lemmon Survey	NYS	600 m	MPC; JPL
815929	2010 VJ_{189}	—	November 13, 2010	Mount Lemmon	Mount Lemmon Survey	·	500 m	MPC; JPL
815930	2010 VM_{203}	—	October 13, 2010	Mount Lemmon	Mount Lemmon Survey	RAF	670 m	MPC; JPL
815931	2010 VQ_{207}	—	December 29, 2011	Kitt Peak	Spacewatch	·	2.4 km	MPC; JPL
815932	2010 VN_{211}	—	October 24, 2003	Kitt Peak	Spacewatch	·	500 m	MPC; JPL
815933	2010 VE_{214}	—	November 1, 2010	Palomar	Palomar Transient Factory	H	440 m	MPC; JPL
815934	2010 VP_{217}	—	October 8, 2010	Catalina	CSS	PHO	770 m	MPC; JPL
815935	2010 VE_{222}	—	November 2, 2010	Mount Lemmon	Mount Lemmon Survey	·	1.8 km	MPC; JPL
815936	2010 VF_{226}	—	October 17, 2010	Mount Lemmon	Mount Lemmon Survey	·	2.3 km	MPC; JPL
815937	2010 VP_{230}	—	November 12, 2010	Mount Lemmon	Mount Lemmon Survey	·	2.0 km	MPC; JPL
815938	2010 VE_{234}	—	March 23, 2015	Haleakala	Pan-STARRS 1	·	430 m	MPC; JPL
815939	2010 VO_{237}	—	November 14, 2010	Mount Lemmon	Mount Lemmon Survey	H	360 m	MPC; JPL
815940	2010 VF_{240}	—	November 4, 2010	Mount Lemmon	Mount Lemmon Survey	·	930 m	MPC; JPL
815941	2010 VX_{240}	—	November 1, 2010	Kitt Peak	Spacewatch	T_{j} (2.98) · 3:2	4.3 km	MPC; JPL
815942	2010 VG_{241}	—	August 20, 2014	Haleakala	Pan-STARRS 1	AGN	860 m	MPC; JPL
815943	2010 VJ_{241}	—	November 3, 2010	Mount Lemmon	Mount Lemmon Survey	·	1.4 km	MPC; JPL
815944	2010 VF_{242}	—	September 16, 2010	Mount Lemmon	Mount Lemmon Survey	·	700 m	MPC; JPL
815945	2010 VQ_{242}	—	April 10, 2013	ESA OGS	ESA OGS	·	2.0 km	MPC; JPL
815946	2010 VF_{243}	—	November 3, 2010	Mount Lemmon	Mount Lemmon Survey	H	460 m	MPC; JPL
815947	2010 VV_{243}	—	October 3, 2013	Haleakala	Pan-STARRS 1	·	670 m	MPC; JPL
815948	2010 VQ_{247}	—	November 13, 2010	Mount Lemmon	Mount Lemmon Survey	·	970 m	MPC; JPL
815949	2010 VH_{251}	—	November 1, 2010	Mount Lemmon	Mount Lemmon Survey	·	440 m	MPC; JPL
815950	2010 VP_{255}	—	November 12, 2010	Mount Lemmon	Mount Lemmon Survey	·	720 m	MPC; JPL
815951	2010 VT_{257}	—	November 2, 2010	Mount Lemmon	Mount Lemmon Survey	·	2.2 km	MPC; JPL
815952	2010 VO_{258}	—	November 12, 2010	Mount Lemmon	Mount Lemmon Survey	·	1.7 km	MPC; JPL
815953	2010 VJ_{262}	—	November 10, 2010	Mount Lemmon	Mount Lemmon Survey	·	940 m	MPC; JPL
815954	2010 VF_{265}	—	November 4, 2010	Mount Lemmon	Mount Lemmon Survey	·	2.4 km	MPC; JPL
815955	2010 VX_{270}	—	November 15, 2010	Mount Lemmon	Mount Lemmon Survey	·	2.3 km	MPC; JPL
815956	2010 VM_{273}	—	November 13, 2010	Mount Lemmon	Mount Lemmon Survey	·	2.4 km	MPC; JPL
815957	2010 VN_{275}	—	November 13, 2010	Mount Lemmon	Mount Lemmon Survey	LIX	2.9 km	MPC; JPL
815958	2010 VE_{277}	—	November 8, 2010	Mauna Kea	Forshay, P., M. Micheli	·	1.9 km	MPC; JPL
815959	2010 VJ_{287}	—	July 19, 2015	Haleakala	Pan-STARRS 1	·	1.8 km	MPC; JPL
815960	2010 WF	—	May 7, 2014	Haleakala	Pan-STARRS 1	·	1.7 km	MPC; JPL
815961	2010 WG_{6}	—	October 28, 2010	Mount Lemmon	Mount Lemmon Survey	·	900 m	MPC; JPL
815962	2010 WL_{19}	—	November 27, 2010	Mount Lemmon	Mount Lemmon Survey	·	2.3 km	MPC; JPL
815963	2010 WH_{20}	—	November 27, 2010	Mount Lemmon	Mount Lemmon Survey	·	2.2 km	MPC; JPL
815964	2010 WA_{26}	—	October 29, 2010	Mount Lemmon	Mount Lemmon Survey	·	2.4 km	MPC; JPL
815965	2010 WH_{32}	—	November 5, 2010	Kitt Peak	Spacewatch	·	560 m	MPC; JPL
815966	2010 WV_{46}	—	November 27, 2010	Mount Lemmon	Mount Lemmon Survey	·	880 m	MPC; JPL
815967	2010 WH_{49}	—	November 27, 2010	Mount Lemmon	Mount Lemmon Survey	·	2.5 km	MPC; JPL
815968	2010 WQ_{53}	—	November 14, 2010	Kitt Peak	Spacewatch	·	860 m	MPC; JPL
815969	2010 WE_{54}	—	November 28, 2010	Mount Lemmon	Mount Lemmon Survey	·	510 m	MPC; JPL
815970	2010 WD_{69}	—	November 7, 2010	Mount Lemmon	Mount Lemmon Survey	·	590 m	MPC; JPL
815971	2010 WM_{76}	—	November 16, 2010	Mount Lemmon	Mount Lemmon Survey	H	520 m	MPC; JPL
815972	2010 WC_{77}	—	November 27, 2010	Mount Lemmon	Mount Lemmon Survey	·	1.5 km	MPC; JPL
815973	2010 WG_{80}	—	November 28, 2010	Mount Lemmon	Mount Lemmon Survey	·	840 m	MPC; JPL
815974	2010 WJ_{80}	—	November 27, 2010	Mount Lemmon	Mount Lemmon Survey	KON	1.5 km	MPC; JPL
815975	2010 WT_{80}	—	November 26, 2010	Mount Lemmon	Mount Lemmon Survey	·	510 m	MPC; JPL
815976	2010 XL_{3}	—	October 17, 2010	Catalina	CSS	·	1.8 km	MPC; JPL
815977	2010 XX_{3}	—	December 1, 2010	Socorro	LINEAR	H	520 m	MPC; JPL
815978	2010 XF_{4}	—	November 7, 2010	Mount Lemmon	Mount Lemmon Survey	H	530 m	MPC; JPL
815979	2010 XQ_{5}	—	December 1, 2010	Mount Lemmon	Mount Lemmon Survey	T_{j} (2.98) · EUP	2.0 km	MPC; JPL
815980	2010 XV_{7}	—	September 29, 2003	Kitt Peak	Spacewatch	·	470 m	MPC; JPL
815981	2010 XS_{16}	—	August 21, 2006	Dax	C. Rinner, P. Dupouy	·	670 m	MPC; JPL
815982	2010 XR_{19}	—	December 5, 2010	Mount Lemmon	Mount Lemmon Survey	·	470 m	MPC; JPL
815983	2010 XB_{20}	—	October 29, 2010	Kitt Peak	Spacewatch	·	1.0 km	MPC; JPL
815984	2010 XE_{20}	—	October 9, 2010	Mount Lemmon	Mount Lemmon Survey	·	2.1 km	MPC; JPL
815985	2010 XB_{32}	—	December 2, 2010	Mount Lemmon	Mount Lemmon Survey	·	1.5 km	MPC; JPL
815986	2010 XQ_{39}	—	December 4, 2010	Mount Lemmon	Mount Lemmon Survey	·	2.3 km	MPC; JPL
815987	2010 XT_{46}	—	December 5, 2010	Kitt Peak	Spacewatch	·	2.5 km	MPC; JPL
815988	2010 XK_{47}	—	November 1, 2010	Mount Lemmon	Mount Lemmon Survey	(5)	800 m	MPC; JPL
815989	2010 XG_{55}	—	December 2, 2010	Mount Lemmon	Mount Lemmon Survey	·	490 m	MPC; JPL
815990	2010 XH_{63}	—	November 15, 2010	Mount Lemmon	Mount Lemmon Survey	T_{j} (2.95)	3.5 km	MPC; JPL
815991	2010 XE_{65}	—	October 31, 2010	Kitt Peak	Spacewatch	·	500 m	MPC; JPL
815992	2010 XP_{66}	—	December 10, 2010	Kitt Peak	Spacewatch	H	440 m	MPC; JPL
815993	2010 XM_{67}	—	December 3, 2010	Mount Lemmon	Mount Lemmon Survey	·	2.0 km	MPC; JPL
815994	2010 XT_{68}	—	December 12, 2010	Socorro	LINEAR	·	710 m	MPC; JPL
815995	2010 XA_{70}	—	December 2, 2010	Mount Lemmon	Mount Lemmon Survey	·	580 m	MPC; JPL
815996	2010 XY_{70}	—	November 13, 2010	Mount Lemmon	Mount Lemmon Survey	·	740 m	MPC; JPL
815997	2010 XU_{74}	—	December 2, 2010	Catalina	CSS	·	890 m	MPC; JPL
815998	2010 XN_{79}	—	October 29, 2010	Kitt Peak	Spacewatch	·	830 m	MPC; JPL
815999	2010 XJ_{81}	—	December 11, 2010	Catalina	CSS	(1547)	1.4 km	MPC; JPL
816000	2010 XO_{82}	—	November 2, 2010	Kitt Peak	Spacewatch	·	1.3 km	MPC; JPL

back to top

== See also ==
- Meanings of minor-planet names: 815001–816000
