= List of minor planets: 259001–260000 =

The following is a partial list of minor planets, running from minor-planet number 259001 through 260000, inclusive. The primary data for this and other partial lists is based on JPL's "Small-Body Orbital Elements" and data available from the Minor Planet Center. Critical list information is also provided by the MPC, unless otherwise specified from Lowell Observatory. A detailed description of the table's columns and additional sources are given on the main page including a complete list of every page in this series, and a statistical break-up on the dynamical classification of minor planets.

Also see the summary list of all named bodies in numerical and alphabetical order, and the corresponding naming citations for the number range of this particular list. New namings may only be added to this list after official publication, as the preannouncement of names is condemned by the Working Group for Small Bodies Nomenclature of the International Astronomical Union.

Near-Earth obj.	MBA (inner)	MBA (outer)	Centaur
Mars-crosser	MBA (middle)	Jupiter trojan	Trans-Neptunian obj.
Unclassified

== 259001–259100 ==
Designation			Discovery			Properties		Ref
Permanent	Provisional	Named after	Date	Site	Discoverer(s)	Category	Diam.	Ref
259001	2002 TP_{92}	—	October 1, 2002	Anderson Mesa	LONEOS	·	1.7 km	MPC · JPL
259002	2002 TM_{98}	—	October 3, 2002	Socorro	LINEAR	·	1.4 km	MPC · JPL
259003	2002 TX_{98}	—	October 3, 2002	Socorro	LINEAR	MAS	740 m	MPC · JPL
259004	2002 TU_{102}	—	October 4, 2002	Socorro	LINEAR	·	1.1 km	MPC · JPL
259005	2002 TD_{104}	—	October 4, 2002	Socorro	LINEAR	·	1.3 km	MPC · JPL
259006	2002 TU_{104}	—	October 4, 2002	Socorro	LINEAR	·	1.5 km	MPC · JPL
259007	2002 TV_{110}	—	October 2, 2002	Campo Imperatore	CINEOS	V	860 m	MPC · JPL
259008	2002 TE_{115}	—	October 3, 2002	Palomar	NEAT	MAR	1.6 km	MPC · JPL
259009	2002 TV_{117}	—	October 3, 2002	Palomar	NEAT	·	2.5 km	MPC · JPL
259010	2002 TC_{118}	—	October 3, 2002	Palomar	NEAT	·	1.7 km	MPC · JPL
259011	2002 TN_{119}	—	October 3, 2002	Palomar	NEAT	·	1.9 km	MPC · JPL
259012	2002 TJ_{121}	—	October 3, 2002	Palomar	NEAT	·	1.7 km	MPC · JPL
259013	2002 TJ_{122}	—	October 3, 2002	Campo Imperatore	CINEOS	·	1.3 km	MPC · JPL
259014	2002 TU_{127}	—	October 4, 2002	Socorro	LINEAR	·	1.9 km	MPC · JPL
259015	2002 TK_{145}	—	October 3, 2002	Socorro	LINEAR	·	1.8 km	MPC · JPL
259016	2002 TY_{150}	—	October 5, 2002	Palomar	NEAT	·	1.5 km	MPC · JPL
259017	2002 TH_{158}	—	October 5, 2002	Palomar	NEAT	·	3.0 km	MPC · JPL
259018	2002 TD_{159}	—	October 5, 2002	Palomar	NEAT	·	1.8 km	MPC · JPL
259019	2002 TW_{174}	—	October 4, 2002	Socorro	LINEAR	(5)	1.4 km	MPC · JPL
259020	2002 TN_{177}	—	October 11, 2002	Palomar	NEAT	H	870 m	MPC · JPL
259021	2002 TL_{189}	—	October 5, 2002	Socorro	LINEAR	·	1.5 km	MPC · JPL
259022	2002 TF_{190}	—	October 13, 2002	Eskridge	G. Hug	·	1.5 km	MPC · JPL
259023	2002 TD_{194}	—	October 3, 2002	Socorro	LINEAR	MAS	1.1 km	MPC · JPL
259024	2002 TF_{194}	—	October 3, 2002	Socorro	LINEAR	MAS	960 m	MPC · JPL
259025	2002 TD_{200}	—	October 8, 2002	Bergisch Gladbach	W. Bickel	·	2.2 km	MPC · JPL
259026	2002 TJ_{208}	—	October 4, 2002	Socorro	LINEAR	PHO	1.5 km	MPC · JPL
259027	2002 TD_{215}	—	October 4, 2002	Socorro	LINEAR	·	2.8 km	MPC · JPL
259028	2002 TW_{217}	—	October 5, 2002	Palomar	NEAT	·	1.4 km	MPC · JPL
259029	2002 TX_{221}	—	October 7, 2002	Anderson Mesa	LONEOS	EUN	1.2 km	MPC · JPL
259030	2002 TN_{223}	—	October 7, 2002	Socorro	LINEAR	·	1.1 km	MPC · JPL
259031	2002 TU_{224}	—	October 8, 2002	Anderson Mesa	LONEOS	NYS	1.6 km	MPC · JPL
259032	2002 TZ_{225}	—	October 8, 2002	Anderson Mesa	LONEOS	·	1.7 km	MPC · JPL
259033	2002 TW_{227}	—	October 8, 2002	Anderson Mesa	LONEOS	NYS	1.7 km	MPC · JPL
259034	2002 TV_{232}	—	October 6, 2002	Socorro	LINEAR	·	2.4 km	MPC · JPL
259035	2002 TA_{236}	—	October 6, 2002	Socorro	LINEAR	·	3.6 km	MPC · JPL
259036	2002 TZ_{238}	—	October 8, 2002	Anderson Mesa	LONEOS	·	2.0 km	MPC · JPL
259037	2002 TV_{244}	—	October 7, 2002	Socorro	LINEAR	·	1.4 km	MPC · JPL
259038	2002 TK_{250}	—	October 7, 2002	Socorro	LINEAR	·	1.4 km	MPC · JPL
259039	2002 TM_{254}	—	October 9, 2002	Anderson Mesa	LONEOS	·	1.4 km	MPC · JPL
259040	2002 TQ_{256}	—	October 9, 2002	Socorro	LINEAR	MAS	900 m	MPC · JPL
259041	2002 TR_{256}	—	October 9, 2002	Socorro	LINEAR	·	2.3 km	MPC · JPL
259042	2002 TE_{278}	—	October 10, 2002	Socorro	LINEAR	·	1.2 km	MPC · JPL
259043	2002 TG_{288}	—	October 10, 2002	Socorro	LINEAR	·	2.3 km	MPC · JPL
259044	2002 TL_{292}	—	October 10, 2002	Socorro	LINEAR	·	2.2 km	MPC · JPL
259045	2002 TE_{308}	—	October 4, 2002	Apache Point	SDSS	·	810 m	MPC · JPL
259046	2002 TN_{314}	—	October 4, 2002	Apache Point	SDSS	·	2.3 km	MPC · JPL
259047	2002 TE_{316}	—	October 4, 2002	Apache Point	SDSS	HNS	1.6 km	MPC · JPL
259048	2002 TD_{317}	—	October 5, 2002	Apache Point	SDSS	·	1.8 km	MPC · JPL
259049	2002 TX_{317}	—	October 5, 2002	Apache Point	SDSS	·	1.5 km	MPC · JPL
259050	2002 TC_{340}	—	October 5, 2002	Apache Point	SDSS	·	1.9 km	MPC · JPL
259051	2002 TS_{340}	—	October 5, 2002	Apache Point	SDSS	·	1.4 km	MPC · JPL
259052	2002 TY_{363}	—	October 10, 2002	Apache Point	SDSS	·	1.2 km	MPC · JPL
259053	2002 TE_{366}	—	October 10, 2002	Apache Point	SDSS	V	670 m	MPC · JPL
259054	2002 TN_{373}	—	October 9, 2002	Palomar	NEAT	·	1.8 km	MPC · JPL
259055	2002 TP_{374}	—	October 11, 2002	Apache Point	SDSS	·	1.6 km	MPC · JPL
259056	2002 TM_{376}	—	October 13, 2002	Palomar	NEAT	H	740 m	MPC · JPL
259057	2002 TP_{381}	—	October 6, 2002	Palomar	NEAT	·	1.4 km	MPC · JPL
259058	2002 TG_{382}	—	October 4, 2002	Apache Point	SDSS	EUN	1.7 km	MPC · JPL
259059	2002 UV_{2}	—	October 28, 2002	Socorro	LINEAR	H	1.0 km	MPC · JPL
259060	2002 UM_{3}	—	October 28, 2002	Socorro	LINEAR	H	760 m	MPC · JPL
259061	2002 US_{6}	—	October 28, 2002	Palomar	NEAT	·	1.2 km	MPC · JPL
259062	2002 UH_{9}	—	October 28, 2002	Palomar	NEAT	·	2.5 km	MPC · JPL
259063	2002 UF_{12}	—	October 30, 2002	Socorro	LINEAR	H	920 m	MPC · JPL
259064	2002 UJ_{15}	—	October 30, 2002	Palomar	NEAT	·	1.6 km	MPC · JPL
259065	2002 UX_{21}	—	October 30, 2002	Haleakala	NEAT	·	1.6 km	MPC · JPL
259066	2002 UX_{23}	—	October 28, 2002	Palomar	NEAT	·	1.5 km	MPC · JPL
259067	2002 UC_{27}	—	October 31, 2002	Anderson Mesa	LONEOS	·	1.9 km	MPC · JPL
259068	2002 UD_{35}	—	October 31, 2002	Socorro	LINEAR	·	2.0 km	MPC · JPL
259069	2002 UJ_{41}	—	October 31, 2002	Palomar	NEAT	V	1.0 km	MPC · JPL
259070	2002 UE_{52}	—	October 29, 2002	Apache Point	SDSS	·	1.5 km	MPC · JPL
259071	2002 UC_{64}	—	October 30, 2002	Apache Point	SDSS	MAS	990 m	MPC · JPL
259072	2002 UO_{68}	—	October 30, 2002	Apache Point	SDSS	·	1.3 km	MPC · JPL
259073	2002 UQ_{73}	—	October 31, 2002	Palomar	NEAT	(5)	1.1 km	MPC · JPL
259074	2002 VL_{9}	—	November 1, 2002	Palomar	NEAT	V	960 m	MPC · JPL
259075	2002 VF_{10}	—	November 1, 2002	Palomar	NEAT	·	2.1 km	MPC · JPL
259076	2002 VA_{21}	—	November 5, 2002	Socorro	LINEAR	·	3.0 km	MPC · JPL
259077	2002 VC_{23}	—	November 5, 2002	Socorro	LINEAR	·	1.2 km	MPC · JPL
259078	2002 VN_{23}	—	November 5, 2002	Socorro	LINEAR	MAR	1.5 km	MPC · JPL
259079	2002 VQ_{25}	—	November 5, 2002	Socorro	LINEAR	NYS	1.3 km	MPC · JPL
259080	2002 VM_{26}	—	November 5, 2002	Socorro	LINEAR	NYS	1.7 km	MPC · JPL
259081	2002 VE_{29}	—	November 5, 2002	Anderson Mesa	LONEOS	·	1.9 km	MPC · JPL
259082	2002 VU_{30}	—	November 5, 2002	Socorro	LINEAR	·	3.4 km	MPC · JPL
259083	2002 VS_{31}	—	November 5, 2002	Socorro	LINEAR	MAS	1.1 km	MPC · JPL
259084	2002 VC_{35}	—	November 5, 2002	Socorro	LINEAR	·	2.3 km	MPC · JPL
259085	2002 VJ_{46}	—	November 5, 2002	Palomar	NEAT	·	1.2 km	MPC · JPL
259086	2002 VA_{55}	—	November 6, 2002	Anderson Mesa	LONEOS	·	1.8 km	MPC · JPL
259087	2002 VL_{64}	—	November 6, 2002	Haleakala	NEAT	·	3.3 km	MPC · JPL
259088	2002 VG_{66}	—	November 8, 2002	Socorro	LINEAR	H	1.0 km	MPC · JPL
259089	2002 VZ_{67}	—	November 7, 2002	Kitt Peak	Spacewatch	·	1.8 km	MPC · JPL
259090	2002 VD_{97}	—	November 12, 2002	Socorro	LINEAR	DOR	4.4 km	MPC · JPL
259091	2002 VA_{99}	—	November 13, 2002	Socorro	LINEAR	BAR	2.0 km	MPC · JPL
259092	2002 VX_{102}	—	November 12, 2002	Socorro	LINEAR	·	2.0 km	MPC · JPL
259093	2002 VC_{104}	—	November 12, 2002	Socorro	LINEAR	·	1.6 km	MPC · JPL
259094	2002 VC_{111}	—	November 13, 2002	Palomar	NEAT	·	2.9 km	MPC · JPL
259095	2002 VJ_{115}	—	November 11, 2002	Socorro	LINEAR	·	1.7 km	MPC · JPL
259096	2002 VS_{116}	—	November 13, 2002	Palomar	NEAT	·	2.0 km	MPC · JPL
259097	2002 VQ_{123}	—	November 14, 2002	Palomar	NEAT	H	750 m	MPC · JPL
259098	2002 VW_{125}	—	November 14, 2002	Palomar	NEAT	H	810 m	MPC · JPL
259099	2002 VN_{142}	—	November 5, 2002	Palomar	NEAT	·	1.6 km	MPC · JPL
259100	2002 VO_{143}	—	November 15, 2002	Palomar	NEAT	·	1.6 km	MPC · JPL

== 259101–259200 ==
back to top

Designation			Discovery			Properties		Ref
Permanent	Provisional	Named after	Date	Site	Discoverer(s)	Category	Diam.	Ref
259101	2002 WS	—	November 20, 2002	Socorro	LINEAR	·	2.0 km	MPC · JPL
259102	2002 WT_{5}	—	November 23, 2002	Palomar	NEAT	·	1.8 km	MPC · JPL
259103	2002 WM_{6}	—	November 24, 2002	Palomar	NEAT	·	2.0 km	MPC · JPL
259104	2002 WC_{7}	—	November 24, 2002	Palomar	NEAT	·	1.6 km	MPC · JPL
259105	2002 WC_{10}	—	November 24, 2002	Palomar	NEAT	·	4.1 km	MPC · JPL
259106	2002 WJ_{10}	—	November 24, 2002	Palomar	NEAT	·	3.3 km	MPC · JPL
259107	2002 WN_{14}	—	November 28, 2002	Anderson Mesa	LONEOS	·	1.4 km	MPC · JPL
259108	2002 WQ_{14}	—	November 28, 2002	Anderson Mesa	LONEOS	·	2.3 km	MPC · JPL
259109	2002 WP_{18}	—	November 30, 2002	Socorro	LINEAR	·	2.4 km	MPC · JPL
259110	2002 WT_{18}	—	November 25, 2002	Lulin	Lulin	·	1.3 km	MPC · JPL
259111	2002 WF_{19}	—	November 24, 2002	Palomar	S. F. Hönig	·	1.2 km	MPC · JPL
259112	2002 XS_{3}	—	December 2, 2002	Socorro	LINEAR	MAR	1.7 km	MPC · JPL
259113	2002 XT_{3}	—	December 2, 2002	Socorro	LINEAR	·	1.8 km	MPC · JPL
259114	2002 XU_{6}	—	December 1, 2002	Haleakala	NEAT	·	1.7 km	MPC · JPL
259115	2002 XT_{12}	—	December 3, 2002	Palomar	NEAT	NYS	1.9 km	MPC · JPL
259116	2002 XN_{13}	—	December 3, 2002	Palomar	NEAT	·	1.9 km	MPC · JPL
259117	2002 XT_{13}	—	December 3, 2002	Palomar	NEAT	V	1.1 km	MPC · JPL
259118	2002 XB_{22}	—	December 2, 2002	Haleakala	NEAT	H	930 m	MPC · JPL
259119	2002 XV_{24}	—	December 5, 2002	Socorro	LINEAR	·	2.4 km	MPC · JPL
259120	2002 XM_{26}	—	December 3, 2002	Palomar	NEAT	H	840 m	MPC · JPL
259121	2002 XN_{26}	—	December 3, 2002	Palomar	NEAT	H	650 m	MPC · JPL
259122	2002 XH_{29}	—	December 5, 2002	Kitt Peak	Spacewatch	HNS	1.9 km	MPC · JPL
259123	2002 XH_{30}	—	December 6, 2002	Socorro	LINEAR	H	870 m	MPC · JPL
259124	2002 XW_{31}	—	December 6, 2002	Socorro	LINEAR	·	2.1 km	MPC · JPL
259125	2002 XC_{35}	—	December 7, 2002	Kitt Peak	Spacewatch	·	4.9 km	MPC · JPL
259126	2002 XF_{37}	—	December 7, 2002	Socorro	LINEAR	·	4.0 km	MPC · JPL
259127	2002 XK_{43}	—	December 12, 2002	Haleakala	NEAT	·	2.1 km	MPC · JPL
259128	2002 XH_{45}	—	December 10, 2002	Socorro	LINEAR	H	930 m	MPC · JPL
259129	2002 XL_{46}	—	December 7, 2002	Socorro	LINEAR	·	2.9 km	MPC · JPL
259130	2002 XN_{48}	—	December 10, 2002	Socorro	LINEAR	·	2.2 km	MPC · JPL
259131	2002 XD_{49}	—	December 10, 2002	Socorro	LINEAR	·	2.5 km	MPC · JPL
259132	2002 XT_{50}	—	December 10, 2002	Palomar	NEAT	H	750 m	MPC · JPL
259133	2002 XR_{57}	—	December 10, 2002	Palomar	NEAT	·	2.0 km	MPC · JPL
259134	2002 XK_{58}	—	December 11, 2002	Socorro	LINEAR	H	820 m	MPC · JPL
259135	2002 XQ_{58}	—	December 11, 2002	Socorro	LINEAR	·	1.9 km	MPC · JPL
259136	2002 XC_{68}	—	December 11, 2002	Palomar	NEAT	·	1.5 km	MPC · JPL
259137	2002 XT_{68}	—	December 11, 2002	Socorro	LINEAR	H	850 m	MPC · JPL
259138	2002 XF_{71}	—	December 10, 2002	Socorro	LINEAR	·	1.8 km	MPC · JPL
259139	2002 XM_{71}	—	December 10, 2002	Socorro	LINEAR	ADE	3.2 km	MPC · JPL
259140	2002 XP_{71}	—	December 10, 2002	Palomar	NEAT	·	1.7 km	MPC · JPL
259141	2002 XQ_{76}	—	December 11, 2002	Socorro	LINEAR	·	2.2 km	MPC · JPL
259142	2002 XB_{77}	—	December 11, 2002	Socorro	LINEAR	·	1.6 km	MPC · JPL
259143	2002 XP_{79}	—	December 11, 2002	Socorro	LINEAR	·	4.2 km	MPC · JPL
259144	2002 XW_{81}	—	December 11, 2002	Socorro	LINEAR	·	2.1 km	MPC · JPL
259145	2002 XM_{82}	—	December 12, 2002	Socorro	LINEAR	·	1.3 km	MPC · JPL
259146	2002 XF_{84}	—	December 13, 2002	Socorro	LINEAR	·	2.1 km	MPC · JPL
259147	2002 XO_{84}	—	December 14, 2002	Socorro	LINEAR	H	1 km	MPC · JPL
259148	2002 XP_{89}	—	December 9, 2002	Bergisch Gladbach	W. Bickel	EUN	1.4 km	MPC · JPL
259149	2002 XC_{90}	—	December 14, 2002	Socorro	LINEAR	·	2.1 km	MPC · JPL
259150	2002 XE_{98}	—	December 5, 2002	Socorro	LINEAR	·	1.9 km	MPC · JPL
259151	2002 XZ_{102}	—	December 5, 2002	Socorro	LINEAR	·	1.9 km	MPC · JPL
259152	2002 XY_{103}	—	December 5, 2002	Socorro	LINEAR	·	2.8 km	MPC · JPL
259153	2002 XJ_{108}	—	December 6, 2002	Socorro	LINEAR	·	2.0 km	MPC · JPL
259154	2002 XJ_{109}	—	December 6, 2002	Socorro	LINEAR	·	2.9 km	MPC · JPL
259155	2002 XF_{115}	—	December 8, 2002	Bergisch Gladbach	W. Bickel	·	1.8 km	MPC · JPL
259156	2002 XO_{115}	—	December 7, 2002	Apache Point	SDSS	·	2.1 km	MPC · JPL
259157	2002 XT_{115}	—	December 7, 2002	Apache Point	SDSS	·	2.7 km	MPC · JPL
259158	2002 XY_{115}	—	December 14, 2002	Apache Point	SDSS	·	1.5 km	MPC · JPL
259159	2002 XA_{116}	—	December 5, 2002	Palomar	NEAT	·	1.8 km	MPC · JPL
259160	2002 XJ_{118}	—	December 7, 2002	Palomar	NEAT	·	2.5 km	MPC · JPL
259161	2002 YV_{4}	—	December 28, 2002	Socorro	LINEAR	H	930 m	MPC · JPL
259162	2002 YG_{6}	—	December 28, 2002	Needville	L. Casady, A. Cruz	·	1.6 km	MPC · JPL
259163	2002 YP_{11}	—	December 31, 2002	Socorro	LINEAR	H	950 m	MPC · JPL
259164	2002 YR_{15}	—	December 31, 2002	Kitt Peak	Spacewatch	·	2.8 km	MPC · JPL
259165	2002 YD_{21}	—	December 31, 2002	Socorro	LINEAR	·	1.9 km	MPC · JPL
259166	2002 YH_{22}	—	December 31, 2002	Socorro	LINEAR	·	1.4 km	MPC · JPL
259167	2002 YW_{28}	—	December 31, 2002	Socorro	LINEAR	JUN	1.5 km	MPC · JPL
259168	2002 YS_{34}	—	December 31, 2002	Socorro	LINEAR	·	1.3 km	MPC · JPL
259169	2002 YY_{35}	—	December 31, 2002	Socorro	LINEAR	·	1.5 km	MPC · JPL
259170	2002 YQ_{36}	—	December 31, 2002	Socorro	LINEAR	·	2.5 km	MPC · JPL
259171	2003 AB	—	January 1, 2003	Tebbutt	F. B. Zoltowski	·	1.8 km	MPC · JPL
259172	2003 AZ	—	January 1, 2003	Socorro	LINEAR	·	2.0 km	MPC · JPL
259173	2003 AO_{1}	—	January 1, 2003	Socorro	LINEAR	·	1.9 km	MPC · JPL
259174	2003 AU_{2}	—	January 2, 2003	Socorro	LINEAR	H	1.0 km	MPC · JPL
259175	2003 AJ_{3}	—	January 1, 2003	Socorro	LINEAR	·	1.8 km	MPC · JPL
259176	2003 AS_{3}	—	January 2, 2003	Socorro	LINEAR	H	830 m	MPC · JPL
259177	2003 AO_{6}	—	January 1, 2003	Kitt Peak	Spacewatch	·	2.9 km	MPC · JPL
259178	2003 AB_{8}	—	January 3, 2003	Socorro	LINEAR	·	2.5 km	MPC · JPL
259179	2003 AJ_{9}	—	January 4, 2003	Socorro	LINEAR	BAR	2.2 km	MPC · JPL
259180	2003 AP_{10}	—	January 1, 2003	Socorro	LINEAR	·	1.7 km	MPC · JPL
259181	2003 AO_{11}	—	January 1, 2003	Socorro	LINEAR	·	2.2 km	MPC · JPL
259182	2003 AO_{13}	—	January 1, 2003	Socorro	LINEAR	·	2.3 km	MPC · JPL
259183	2003 AK_{16}	—	January 4, 2003	Kitt Peak	Spacewatch	3:2	8.0 km	MPC · JPL
259184	2003 AL_{17}	—	January 5, 2003	Socorro	LINEAR	H	810 m	MPC · JPL
259185	2003 AW_{22}	—	January 5, 2003	Socorro	LINEAR	H	980 m	MPC · JPL
259186	2003 AT_{26}	—	January 4, 2003	Socorro	LINEAR	·	2.3 km	MPC · JPL
259187	2003 AZ_{27}	—	January 4, 2003	Kitt Peak	Spacewatch	·	2.2 km	MPC · JPL
259188	2003 AM_{29}	—	January 4, 2003	Socorro	LINEAR	·	2.7 km	MPC · JPL
259189	2003 AR_{29}	—	January 4, 2003	Socorro	LINEAR	(5)	2.2 km	MPC · JPL
259190	2003 AY_{30}	—	January 4, 2003	Kitt Peak	Spacewatch	MIS	2.8 km	MPC · JPL
259191	2003 AT_{31}	—	January 5, 2003	Kitt Peak	Spacewatch	·	2.0 km	MPC · JPL
259192	2003 AN_{34}	—	January 7, 2003	Socorro	LINEAR	·	3.2 km	MPC · JPL
259193	2003 AS_{35}	—	January 7, 2003	Socorro	LINEAR	NYS	1.8 km	MPC · JPL
259194	2003 AT_{37}	—	January 7, 2003	Socorro	LINEAR	DOR	3.6 km	MPC · JPL
259195	2003 AJ_{38}	—	January 7, 2003	Socorro	LINEAR	·	3.2 km	MPC · JPL
259196	2003 AL_{38}	—	January 7, 2003	Socorro	LINEAR	·	1.1 km	MPC · JPL
259197	2003 AA_{39}	—	January 7, 2003	Socorro	LINEAR	·	1.7 km	MPC · JPL
259198	2003 AJ_{40}	—	January 7, 2003	Socorro	LINEAR	·	1.7 km	MPC · JPL
259199	2003 AE_{46}	—	January 5, 2003	Socorro	LINEAR	GEF	1.5 km	MPC · JPL
259200	2003 AN_{47}	—	January 5, 2003	Socorro	LINEAR	·	2.0 km	MPC · JPL

== 259201–259300 ==
back to top

Designation			Discovery			Properties		Ref
Permanent	Provisional	Named after	Date	Site	Discoverer(s)	Category	Diam.	Ref
259201	2003 AN_{48}	—	January 5, 2003	Socorro	LINEAR	·	1.7 km	MPC · JPL
259202	2003 AD_{50}	—	January 5, 2003	Socorro	LINEAR	EUN	1.7 km	MPC · JPL
259203	2003 AJ_{50}	—	January 5, 2003	Socorro	LINEAR	(5)	1.6 km	MPC · JPL
259204	2003 AL_{51}	—	January 5, 2003	Socorro	LINEAR	(5)	1.8 km	MPC · JPL
259205	2003 AT_{51}	—	January 5, 2003	Socorro	LINEAR	·	2.0 km	MPC · JPL
259206	2003 AV_{55}	—	January 5, 2003	Socorro	LINEAR	·	2.1 km	MPC · JPL
259207	2003 AU_{61}	—	January 7, 2003	Socorro	LINEAR	·	1.7 km	MPC · JPL
259208	2003 AP_{62}	—	January 8, 2003	Socorro	LINEAR	·	2.1 km	MPC · JPL
259209	2003 AA_{77}	—	January 10, 2003	Socorro	LINEAR	H	830 m	MPC · JPL
259210	2003 AG_{79}	—	January 11, 2003	Socorro	LINEAR	·	3.6 km	MPC · JPL
259211	2003 AP_{80}	—	January 11, 2003	Socorro	LINEAR	H	860 m	MPC · JPL
259212	2003 AZ_{80}	—	January 13, 2003	Desert Moon	Stevens, B. L.	·	2.2 km	MPC · JPL
259213	2003 BD	—	January 17, 2003	Palomar	NEAT	·	2.1 km	MPC · JPL
259214	2003 BQ	—	January 24, 2003	Palomar	NEAT	·	1.6 km	MPC · JPL
259215	2003 BL_{13}	—	January 26, 2003	Palomar	NEAT	·	2.6 km	MPC · JPL
259216	2003 BO_{14}	—	January 26, 2003	Haleakala	NEAT	·	2.1 km	MPC · JPL
259217	2003 BK_{16}	—	January 26, 2003	Haleakala	NEAT	(5)	2.2 km	MPC · JPL
259218	2003 BK_{17}	—	January 26, 2003	Haleakala	NEAT	(5)	2.2 km	MPC · JPL
259219	2003 BB_{18}	—	January 27, 2003	Socorro	LINEAR	·	2.3 km	MPC · JPL
259220	2003 BA_{19}	—	January 27, 2003	Anderson Mesa	LONEOS	·	4.6 km	MPC · JPL
259221	2003 BA_{21}	—	January 27, 2003	Socorro	LINEAR	APO	520 m	MPC · JPL
259222	2003 BY_{22}	—	January 25, 2003	Palomar	NEAT	·	2.4 km	MPC · JPL
259223	2003 BQ_{23}	—	January 25, 2003	Palomar	NEAT	EUN	2.0 km	MPC · JPL
259224	2003 BJ_{24}	—	January 25, 2003	Palomar	NEAT	·	2.4 km	MPC · JPL
259225	2003 BK_{26}	—	January 26, 2003	Palomar	NEAT	EUN	2.0 km	MPC · JPL
259226	2003 BB_{27}	—	January 26, 2003	Anderson Mesa	LONEOS	EUN	2.1 km	MPC · JPL
259227	2003 BO_{27}	—	January 26, 2003	Anderson Mesa	LONEOS	(5)	1.9 km	MPC · JPL
259228	2003 BP_{28}	—	January 26, 2003	Haleakala	NEAT	(32418)	3.0 km	MPC · JPL
259229	2003 BR_{29}	—	January 27, 2003	Socorro	LINEAR	·	2.0 km	MPC · JPL
259230	2003 BS_{36}	—	January 27, 2003	Socorro	LINEAR	·	2.0 km	MPC · JPL
259231	2003 BM_{38}	—	January 27, 2003	Anderson Mesa	LONEOS	·	2.4 km	MPC · JPL
259232	2003 BM_{44}	—	January 27, 2003	Socorro	LINEAR	(5)	1.6 km	MPC · JPL
259233	2003 BA_{45}	—	January 27, 2003	Palomar	NEAT	GEF	1.6 km	MPC · JPL
259234	2003 BH_{51}	—	January 27, 2003	Socorro	LINEAR	·	1.8 km	MPC · JPL
259235	2003 BR_{51}	—	January 27, 2003	Socorro	LINEAR	·	2.2 km	MPC · JPL
259236	2003 BR_{52}	—	January 27, 2003	Socorro	LINEAR	·	2.8 km	MPC · JPL
259237	2003 BU_{53}	—	January 27, 2003	Anderson Mesa	LONEOS	·	2.8 km	MPC · JPL
259238	2003 BX_{53}	—	January 27, 2003	Socorro	LINEAR	·	1.1 km	MPC · JPL
259239	2003 BT_{57}	—	January 27, 2003	Socorro	LINEAR	·	2.5 km	MPC · JPL
259240	2003 BG_{63}	—	January 28, 2003	Socorro	LINEAR	JUN	1.7 km	MPC · JPL
259241	2003 BG_{64}	—	January 29, 2003	Palomar	NEAT	·	1.8 km	MPC · JPL
259242	2003 BE_{67}	—	January 30, 2003	Haleakala	NEAT	·	1.4 km	MPC · JPL
259243	2003 BF_{67}	—	January 30, 2003	Haleakala	NEAT	·	2.5 km	MPC · JPL
259244	2003 BJ_{67}	—	January 30, 2003	Haleakala	NEAT	·	3.1 km	MPC · JPL
259245	2003 BX_{71}	—	January 28, 2003	Socorro	LINEAR	ADE	2.4 km	MPC · JPL
259246	2003 BS_{74}	—	January 29, 2003	Palomar	NEAT	·	2.1 km	MPC · JPL
259247	2003 BS_{76}	—	January 29, 2003	Palomar	NEAT	·	2.3 km	MPC · JPL
259248	2003 BB_{78}	—	January 30, 2003	Haleakala	NEAT	(5)	1.6 km	MPC · JPL
259249	2003 BD_{85}	—	January 31, 2003	Socorro	LINEAR	·	1.3 km	MPC · JPL
259250	2003 BQ_{87}	—	January 27, 2003	Anderson Mesa	LONEOS	·	1.8 km	MPC · JPL
259251	2003 BK_{93}	—	January 29, 2003	Palomar	NEAT	·	2.0 km	MPC · JPL
259252	2003 BW_{93}	—	January 16, 2003	Palomar	NEAT	·	3.0 km	MPC · JPL
259253	2003 CY	—	February 1, 2003	Socorro	LINEAR	H	880 m	MPC · JPL
259254	2003 CD_{2}	—	February 1, 2003	Anderson Mesa	LONEOS	EUN	1.6 km	MPC · JPL
259255	2003 CF_{3}	—	February 2, 2003	Haleakala	NEAT	·	1.1 km	MPC · JPL
259256	2003 CD_{4}	—	February 1, 2003	Socorro	LINEAR	·	2.5 km	MPC · JPL
259257	2003 CN_{5}	—	February 1, 2003	Socorro	LINEAR	·	1.7 km	MPC · JPL
259258	2003 CG_{6}	—	February 1, 2003	Socorro	LINEAR	3:2	7.4 km	MPC · JPL
259259	2003 CU_{6}	—	February 1, 2003	Socorro	LINEAR	·	2.9 km	MPC · JPL
259260	2003 CS_{9}	—	February 2, 2003	Socorro	LINEAR	·	4.3 km	MPC · JPL
259261	2003 CZ_{9}	—	February 2, 2003	Socorro	LINEAR	·	2.0 km	MPC · JPL
259262	2003 CZ_{10}	—	February 3, 2003	Haleakala	NEAT	·	1.9 km	MPC · JPL
259263	2003 CC_{12}	—	February 2, 2003	Palomar	NEAT	·	2.2 km	MPC · JPL
259264	2003 CQ_{12}	—	February 2, 2003	Palomar	NEAT	·	1.7 km	MPC · JPL
259265	2003 CN_{13}	—	February 4, 2003	Anderson Mesa	LONEOS	EUN	1.9 km	MPC · JPL
259266	2003 CS_{13}	—	February 4, 2003	Anderson Mesa	LONEOS	·	2.0 km	MPC · JPL
259267	2003 CT_{15}	—	February 6, 2003	Palomar	NEAT	H	1.0 km	MPC · JPL
259268	2003 CL_{16}	—	February 7, 2003	Desert Eagle	W. K. Y. Yeung	·	1.9 km	MPC · JPL
259269	2003 CE_{19}	—	February 10, 2003	Socorro	LINEAR	·	3.0 km	MPC · JPL
259270	2003 CF_{20}	—	February 8, 2003	Socorro	LINEAR	·	3.6 km	MPC · JPL
259271	2003 CC_{25}	—	February 11, 2003	Socorro	LINEAR	·	4.1 km	MPC · JPL
259272	2003 CE_{25}	—	February 1, 2003	Palomar	NEAT	·	3.0 km	MPC · JPL
259273	2003 DW_{2}	—	February 22, 2003	Kitt Peak	Spacewatch	·	3.8 km	MPC · JPL
259274	2003 DT_{4}	—	February 22, 2003	Essen	Essen	·	2.2 km	MPC · JPL
259275	2003 DK_{10}	—	February 24, 2003	Haleakala	NEAT	·	2.8 km	MPC · JPL
259276	2003 DN_{15}	—	February 26, 2003	Haleakala	NEAT	·	2.5 km	MPC · JPL
259277	2003 DX_{17}	—	February 19, 2003	Palomar	NEAT	·	1.8 km	MPC · JPL
259278	2003 DV_{19}	—	February 22, 2003	Palomar	NEAT	·	1.3 km	MPC · JPL
259279	2003 DQ_{24}	—	February 23, 2003	Anderson Mesa	LONEOS	·	2.6 km	MPC · JPL
259280	2003 DX_{24}	—	February 21, 2003	Palomar	NEAT	·	1.9 km	MPC · JPL
259281	2003 EL	—	March 2, 2003	Socorro	LINEAR	·	2.7 km	MPC · JPL
259282	2003 EV_{2}	—	March 5, 2003	Socorro	LINEAR	·	5.1 km	MPC · JPL
259283	2003 EP_{5}	—	March 5, 2003	Socorro	LINEAR	·	3.5 km	MPC · JPL
259284	2003 ER_{6}	—	March 6, 2003	Anderson Mesa	LONEOS	(5)	1.6 km	MPC · JPL
259285	2003 EV_{18}	—	March 6, 2003	Anderson Mesa	LONEOS	RAF	1.3 km	MPC · JPL
259286	2003 EJ_{20}	—	March 6, 2003	Anderson Mesa	LONEOS	EUP	4.7 km	MPC · JPL
259287	2003 ED_{21}	—	March 6, 2003	Anderson Mesa	LONEOS	·	3.6 km	MPC · JPL
259288	2003 EW_{24}	—	March 6, 2003	Socorro	LINEAR	JUN	1.4 km	MPC · JPL
259289	2003 ED_{31}	—	March 6, 2003	Palomar	NEAT	·	2.1 km	MPC · JPL
259290	2003 EP_{31}	—	March 7, 2003	Socorro	LINEAR	·	2.3 km	MPC · JPL
259291	2003 ET_{35}	—	March 7, 2003	Anderson Mesa	LONEOS	·	2.0 km	MPC · JPL
259292	2003 EY_{37}	—	March 8, 2003	Anderson Mesa	LONEOS	ADE	3.3 km	MPC · JPL
259293	2003 EB_{38}	—	March 8, 2003	Anderson Mesa	LONEOS	·	2.3 km	MPC · JPL
259294	2003 EB_{39}	—	March 8, 2003	Kitt Peak	Spacewatch	·	2.1 km	MPC · JPL
259295	2003 EU_{39}	—	March 8, 2003	Socorro	LINEAR	·	2.1 km	MPC · JPL
259296	2003 EL_{41}	—	March 9, 2003	Socorro	LINEAR	·	2.3 km	MPC · JPL
259297	2003 EF_{45}	—	March 7, 2003	Socorro	LINEAR	·	3.5 km	MPC · JPL
259298	2003 ED_{49}	—	March 10, 2003	Socorro	LINEAR	·	2.4 km	MPC · JPL
259299	2003 EQ_{51}	—	March 9, 2003	Socorro	LINEAR	(5)	1.6 km	MPC · JPL
259300	2003 EE_{57}	—	March 9, 2003	Anderson Mesa	LONEOS	JUN	1.7 km	MPC · JPL

== 259301–259400 ==
back to top

Designation			Discovery			Properties		Ref
Permanent	Provisional	Named after	Date	Site	Discoverer(s)	Category	Diam.	Ref
259301	2003 ED_{58}	—	March 9, 2003	Palomar	NEAT	EUN	2.0 km	MPC · JPL
259302	2003 EH_{58}	—	March 12, 2003	Socorro	LINEAR	·	1.9 km	MPC · JPL
259303	2003 EM_{58}	—	March 12, 2003	Palomar	NEAT	·	3.0 km	MPC · JPL
259304	2003 EQ_{58}	—	March 10, 2003	Anderson Mesa	LONEOS	·	3.2 km	MPC · JPL
259305	2003 EG_{62}	—	March 3, 2003	Socorro	LINEAR	·	2.4 km	MPC · JPL
259306	2003 EA_{63}	—	March 8, 2003	Kitt Peak	Spacewatch	NEM	2.6 km	MPC · JPL
259307	2003 EF_{63}	—	March 6, 2003	Anderson Mesa	LONEOS	·	5.2 km	MPC · JPL
259308	2003 FY_{1}	—	March 23, 2003	Kleť	J. Tichá, M. Tichý	·	970 m	MPC · JPL
259309	2003 FB_{2}	—	March 23, 2003	Kleť	J. Tichá, M. Tichý	·	3.2 km	MPC · JPL
259310	2003 FG_{8}	—	March 21, 2003	Bergisch Gladbach	W. Bickel	·	4.2 km	MPC · JPL
259311	2003 FL_{20}	—	March 23, 2003	Palomar	NEAT	·	2.4 km	MPC · JPL
259312	2003 FH_{29}	—	March 25, 2003	Palomar	NEAT	·	2.3 km	MPC · JPL
259313	2003 FX_{30}	—	March 31, 2003	Anderson Mesa	LONEOS	·	2.9 km	MPC · JPL
259314	2003 FB_{36}	—	March 23, 2003	Kitt Peak	Spacewatch	·	3.5 km	MPC · JPL
259315	2003 FU_{37}	—	March 23, 2003	Kitt Peak	Spacewatch	·	1.7 km	MPC · JPL
259316	2003 FJ_{38}	—	March 23, 2003	Kitt Peak	Spacewatch	L4 · ERY	9.0 km	MPC · JPL
259317	2003 FA_{40}	—	March 24, 2003	Kitt Peak	Spacewatch	·	2.4 km	MPC · JPL
259318	2003 FW_{47}	—	March 24, 2003	Kitt Peak	Spacewatch	·	1.7 km	MPC · JPL
259319	2003 FL_{61}	—	March 26, 2003	Palomar	NEAT	·	1.8 km	MPC · JPL
259320	2003 FW_{62}	—	March 26, 2003	Palomar	NEAT	·	2.9 km	MPC · JPL
259321	2003 FM_{65}	—	March 26, 2003	Palomar	NEAT	HOF	3.6 km	MPC · JPL
259322	2003 FJ_{66}	—	March 26, 2003	Palomar	NEAT	·	2.1 km	MPC · JPL
259323	2003 FN_{68}	—	March 26, 2003	Palomar	NEAT	·	2.9 km	MPC · JPL
259324	2003 FV_{71}	—	March 26, 2003	Haleakala	NEAT	·	2.0 km	MPC · JPL
259325	2003 FB_{72}	—	March 26, 2003	Haleakala	NEAT	EUN	2.1 km	MPC · JPL
259326	2003 FY_{74}	—	March 26, 2003	Palomar	NEAT	·	4.6 km	MPC · JPL
259327	2003 FD_{91}	—	March 29, 2003	Anderson Mesa	LONEOS	·	3.2 km	MPC · JPL
259328	2003 FG_{94}	—	March 29, 2003	Anderson Mesa	LONEOS	·	5.7 km	MPC · JPL
259329	2003 FT_{94}	—	March 29, 2003	Anderson Mesa	LONEOS	·	4.7 km	MPC · JPL
259330	2003 FE_{95}	—	March 30, 2003	Anderson Mesa	LONEOS	EOS	3.0 km	MPC · JPL
259331	2003 FY_{97}	—	March 30, 2003	Kitt Peak	Spacewatch	·	2.6 km	MPC · JPL
259332	2003 FH_{108}	—	March 30, 2003	Palomar	NEAT	·	1.9 km	MPC · JPL
259333	2003 FC_{111}	—	March 31, 2003	Socorro	LINEAR	JUN	1.5 km	MPC · JPL
259334	2003 FD_{111}	—	March 31, 2003	Socorro	LINEAR	·	2.3 km	MPC · JPL
259335	2003 FV_{116}	—	March 24, 2003	Kitt Peak	Spacewatch	·	3.3 km	MPC · JPL
259336	2003 FU_{118}	—	March 26, 2003	Anderson Mesa	LONEOS	EOS	2.3 km	MPC · JPL
259337	2003 FK_{120}	—	March 23, 2003	Kitt Peak	Spacewatch	·	4.7 km	MPC · JPL
259338	2003 FY_{121}	—	March 27, 2003	Palomar	NEAT	AGN	1.5 km	MPC · JPL
259339	2003 FD_{130}	—	March 24, 2003	Kitt Peak	Spacewatch	·	2.5 km	MPC · JPL
259340	2003 FK_{130}	—	March 31, 2003	Kitt Peak	Spacewatch	·	3.4 km	MPC · JPL
259341	2003 FB_{132}	—	March 31, 2003	Kitt Peak	Spacewatch	·	2.6 km	MPC · JPL
259342	2003 FB_{133}	—	March 24, 2003	Kitt Peak	Spacewatch	L4	10 km	MPC · JPL
259343	2003 FK_{133}	—	March 27, 2003	Kitt Peak	Spacewatch	L4	9.8 km	MPC · JPL
259344 Paré	2003 GQ	Paré	April 2, 2003	Saint-Sulpice	B. Christophe	·	1.9 km	MPC · JPL
259345	2003 GJ_{14}	—	April 1, 2003	Socorro	LINEAR	·	1.9 km	MPC · JPL
259346	2003 GO_{22}	—	April 4, 2003	Haleakala	NEAT	EUN	2.1 km	MPC · JPL
259347	2003 GD_{24}	—	April 5, 2003	Kitt Peak	Spacewatch	EOS	2.2 km	MPC · JPL
259348	2003 GN_{24}	—	April 7, 2003	Kitt Peak	Spacewatch	EOS	2.4 km	MPC · JPL
259349	2003 GB_{26}	—	April 4, 2003	Kitt Peak	Spacewatch	·	1.8 km	MPC · JPL
259350	2003 GD_{27}	—	April 6, 2003	Kitt Peak	Spacewatch	EOS	2.6 km	MPC · JPL
259351	2003 GZ_{31}	—	April 8, 2003	Socorro	LINEAR	·	3.4 km	MPC · JPL
259352	2003 GG_{34}	—	April 5, 2003	Anderson Mesa	LONEOS	·	2.9 km	MPC · JPL
259353	2003 GT_{41}	—	April 9, 2003	Kitt Peak	Spacewatch	·	1.0 km	MPC · JPL
259354	2003 GQ_{44}	—	April 9, 2003	Haleakala	NEAT	·	2.1 km	MPC · JPL
259355	2003 GQ_{45}	—	April 8, 2003	Palomar	NEAT	·	2.1 km	MPC · JPL
259356	2003 GT_{45}	—	April 8, 2003	Palomar	NEAT	NEM	3.0 km	MPC · JPL
259357	2003 GH_{46}	—	April 8, 2003	Palomar	NEAT	L4	10 km	MPC · JPL
259358	2003 GP_{50}	—	April 6, 2003	Anderson Mesa	LONEOS	·	4.4 km	MPC · JPL
259359	2003 GQ_{51}	—	April 10, 2003	Socorro	LINEAR	·	2.3 km	MPC · JPL
259360	2003 GA_{57}	—	April 5, 2003	Kitt Peak	Spacewatch	L4	10 km	MPC · JPL
259361	2003 GJ_{57}	—	April 11, 2003	Kitt Peak	Spacewatch	L4	17 km	MPC · JPL
259362	2003 HH_{2}	—	April 25, 2003	Socorro	LINEAR	H	1.1 km	MPC · JPL
259363	2003 HJ_{2}	—	April 25, 2003	Socorro	LINEAR	·	2.7 km	MPC · JPL
259364	2003 HU_{3}	—	April 24, 2003	Anderson Mesa	LONEOS	·	3.9 km	MPC · JPL
259365	2003 HE_{10}	—	April 25, 2003	Kitt Peak	Spacewatch	·	860 m	MPC · JPL
259366	2003 HL_{11}	—	April 23, 2003	Campo Imperatore	CINEOS	·	4.5 km	MPC · JPL
259367	2003 HP_{11}	—	April 24, 2003	Anderson Mesa	LONEOS	·	2.0 km	MPC · JPL
259368	2003 HZ_{11}	—	April 25, 2003	Anderson Mesa	LONEOS	·	2.8 km	MPC · JPL
259369	2003 HM_{13}	—	April 24, 2003	Kitt Peak	Spacewatch	·	2.3 km	MPC · JPL
259370	2003 HQ_{14}	—	April 26, 2003	Haleakala	NEAT	L4	10 km	MPC · JPL
259371	2003 HK_{16}	—	April 24, 2003	Socorro	LINEAR	H	840 m	MPC · JPL
259372	2003 HR_{17}	—	April 25, 2003	Kitt Peak	Spacewatch	·	2.4 km	MPC · JPL
259373	2003 HA_{25}	—	April 25, 2003	Kitt Peak	Spacewatch	EOS	2.3 km	MPC · JPL
259374	2003 HQ_{26}	—	April 27, 2003	Socorro	LINEAR	·	4.0 km	MPC · JPL
259375	2003 HT_{26}	—	April 27, 2003	Anderson Mesa	LONEOS	·	2.7 km	MPC · JPL
259376	2003 HG_{27}	—	April 27, 2003	Anderson Mesa	LONEOS	·	2.5 km	MPC · JPL
259377	2003 HQ_{38}	—	April 29, 2003	Haleakala	NEAT	·	2.7 km	MPC · JPL
259378	2003 HF_{49}	—	April 30, 2003	Haleakala	NEAT	·	2.9 km	MPC · JPL
259379	2003 HS_{50}	—	April 28, 2003	Socorro	LINEAR	·	2.6 km	MPC · JPL
259380	2003 HE_{51}	—	April 29, 2003	Kitt Peak	Spacewatch	·	6.6 km	MPC · JPL
259381	2003 HL_{53}	—	April 30, 2003	Goodricke-Pigott	Kessel, J. W.	·	3.5 km	MPC · JPL
259382	2003 HA_{55}	—	April 25, 2003	Kitt Peak	Spacewatch	·	4.5 km	MPC · JPL
259383	2003 JH_{8}	—	May 2, 2003	Socorro	LINEAR	·	2.0 km	MPC · JPL
259384	2003 JX_{10}	—	May 4, 2003	Kleť	J. Tichá, M. Tichý	fast	5.0 km	MPC · JPL
259385	2003 KC_{5}	—	May 22, 2003	Kitt Peak	Spacewatch	·	1.9 km	MPC · JPL
259386	2003 KJ_{7}	—	May 23, 2003	Kitt Peak	Spacewatch	TIR	3.9 km	MPC · JPL
259387 Atauta	2003 KT_{13}	Atauta	May 25, 2003	Sierra Nevada	Sota, A.	·	2.6 km	MPC · JPL
259388	2003 LL	—	June 1, 2003	Kitt Peak	Spacewatch	EOS	2.3 km	MPC · JPL
259389	2003 MX_{8}	—	June 28, 2003	Socorro	LINEAR	·	840 m	MPC · JPL
259390	2003 NG_{7}	—	July 7, 2003	Reedy Creek	J. Broughton	·	1.0 km	MPC · JPL
259391	2003 OY_{1}	—	July 22, 2003	Haleakala	NEAT	·	4.1 km	MPC · JPL
259392	2003 OY_{6}	—	July 23, 2003	Palomar	NEAT	·	7.0 km	MPC · JPL
259393	2003 OA_{7}	—	July 23, 2003	Palomar	NEAT	·	750 m	MPC · JPL
259394	2003 OK_{11}	—	July 20, 2003	Palomar	NEAT	LUT	6.2 km	MPC · JPL
259395	2003 PD_{2}	—	August 2, 2003	Haleakala	NEAT	TEL	2.2 km	MPC · JPL
259396	2003 QH	—	August 18, 2003	Campo Imperatore	CINEOS	V	860 m	MPC · JPL
259397	2003 QF_{2}	—	August 20, 2003	Socorro	LINEAR	PHO	2.9 km	MPC · JPL
259398	2003 QT_{2}	—	August 19, 2003	Campo Imperatore	CINEOS	·	960 m	MPC · JPL
259399	2003 QG_{5}	—	August 20, 2003	Campo Imperatore	CINEOS	NYS	1.6 km	MPC · JPL
259400	2003 QZ_{5}	—	August 19, 2003	Campo Imperatore	CINEOS	·	770 m	MPC · JPL

== 259401–259500 ==
back to top

Designation			Discovery			Properties		Ref
Permanent	Provisional	Named after	Date	Site	Discoverer(s)	Category	Diam.	Ref
259401	2003 QZ_{8}	—	August 20, 2003	Campo Imperatore	CINEOS	·	3.6 km	MPC · JPL
259402	2003 QU_{22}	—	August 20, 2003	Palomar	NEAT	HYG	4.6 km	MPC · JPL
259403	2003 QL_{24}	—	August 21, 2003	Campo Imperatore	CINEOS	·	5.9 km	MPC · JPL
259404	2003 QG_{26}	—	August 22, 2003	Haleakala	NEAT	·	1.1 km	MPC · JPL
259405	2003 QQ_{46}	—	August 24, 2003	Črni Vrh	Skvarč, J.	·	5.6 km	MPC · JPL
259406	2003 QE_{50}	—	August 22, 2003	Palomar	NEAT	·	1.0 km	MPC · JPL
259407	2003 QJ_{51}	—	August 22, 2003	Palomar	NEAT	·	950 m	MPC · JPL
259408	2003 QG_{54}	—	August 23, 2003	Socorro	LINEAR	·	1.0 km	MPC · JPL
259409	2003 QF_{65}	—	August 23, 2003	Palomar	NEAT	·	6.0 km	MPC · JPL
259410	2003 QJ_{65}	—	August 23, 2003	Palomar	NEAT	·	1.1 km	MPC · JPL
259411	2003 QE_{70}	—	August 23, 2003	Palomar	NEAT	·	3.7 km	MPC · JPL
259412	2003 QB_{72}	—	August 26, 2003	Socorro	LINEAR	·	3.8 km	MPC · JPL
259413	2003 QX_{72}	—	August 24, 2003	Socorro	LINEAR	·	4.7 km	MPC · JPL
259414	2003 QW_{73}	—	August 26, 2003	Črni Vrh	Mikuž, H.	·	820 m	MPC · JPL
259415	2003 QB_{76}	—	August 24, 2003	Socorro	LINEAR	·	800 m	MPC · JPL
259416	2003 QK_{77}	—	August 24, 2003	Socorro	LINEAR	EUP	5.4 km	MPC · JPL
259417	2003 QV_{86}	—	August 25, 2003	Socorro	LINEAR	·	4.9 km	MPC · JPL
259418	2003 QX_{101}	—	August 29, 2003	Haleakala	NEAT	·	1.2 km	MPC · JPL
259419	2003 QN_{102}	—	August 31, 2003	Kitt Peak	Spacewatch	·	4.2 km	MPC · JPL
259420	2003 QJ_{105}	—	August 31, 2003	Haleakala	NEAT	·	1.2 km	MPC · JPL
259421	2003 QU_{105}	—	August 30, 2003	Kitt Peak	Spacewatch	·	1.1 km	MPC · JPL
259422	2003 RE_{3}	—	September 1, 2003	Socorro	LINEAR	·	1.4 km	MPC · JPL
259423	2003 RD_{7}	—	September 4, 2003	Socorro	LINEAR	EOS	3.1 km	MPC · JPL
259424	2003 RP_{17}	—	September 14, 2003	Palomar	NEAT	·	4.1 km	MPC · JPL
259425	2003 RZ_{20}	—	September 15, 2003	Anderson Mesa	LONEOS	3:2 · SHU	8.1 km	MPC · JPL
259426	2003 SK	—	September 16, 2003	Palomar	NEAT	·	860 m	MPC · JPL
259427	2003 SN	—	September 16, 2003	Kitt Peak	Spacewatch	VER	3.7 km	MPC · JPL
259428	2003 SP_{4}	—	September 16, 2003	Palomar	NEAT	·	1.2 km	MPC · JPL
259429	2003 SA_{5}	—	September 16, 2003	Kitt Peak	Spacewatch	·	1.3 km	MPC · JPL
259430	2003 SN_{6}	—	September 17, 2003	Palomar	NEAT	·	980 m	MPC · JPL
259431	2003 SW_{10}	—	September 17, 2003	Kitt Peak	Spacewatch	·	960 m	MPC · JPL
259432	2003 SA_{11}	—	September 17, 2003	Kitt Peak	Spacewatch	·	830 m	MPC · JPL
259433	2003 SE_{17}	—	September 18, 2003	Campo Imperatore	CINEOS	·	950 m	MPC · JPL
259434	2003 ST_{22}	—	September 16, 2003	Kitt Peak	Spacewatch	·	680 m	MPC · JPL
259435	2003 SQ_{23}	—	September 17, 2003	Kitt Peak	Spacewatch	·	800 m	MPC · JPL
259436	2003 SO_{28}	—	September 18, 2003	Palomar	NEAT	CYB	5.2 km	MPC · JPL
259437	2003 SY_{28}	—	September 18, 2003	Palomar	NEAT	·	1.1 km	MPC · JPL
259438	2003 SJ_{30}	—	September 18, 2003	Palomar	NEAT	·	1.0 km	MPC · JPL
259439	2003 SM_{30}	—	September 18, 2003	Kitt Peak	Spacewatch	·	780 m	MPC · JPL
259440	2003 SM_{33}	—	September 16, 2003	Anderson Mesa	LONEOS	NYS	1.4 km	MPC · JPL
259441	2003 SH_{37}	—	September 16, 2003	Palomar	NEAT	·	1.6 km	MPC · JPL
259442	2003 SL_{39}	—	September 16, 2003	Palomar	NEAT	·	820 m	MPC · JPL
259443	2003 SZ_{41}	—	September 17, 2003	Palomar	NEAT	PHO	3.6 km	MPC · JPL
259444	2003 SH_{43}	—	September 16, 2003	Anderson Mesa	LONEOS	·	750 m	MPC · JPL
259445	2003 SS_{49}	—	September 18, 2003	Palomar	NEAT	·	900 m	MPC · JPL
259446	2003 SD_{51}	—	September 18, 2003	Palomar	NEAT	·	1.0 km	MPC · JPL
259447	2003 SU_{51}	—	September 18, 2003	Palomar	NEAT	·	1.4 km	MPC · JPL
259448	2003 SQ_{54}	—	September 16, 2003	Anderson Mesa	LONEOS	(1298)	5.4 km	MPC · JPL
259449	2003 SF_{58}	—	September 17, 2003	Anderson Mesa	LONEOS	·	5.4 km	MPC · JPL
259450	2003 SK_{68}	—	September 17, 2003	Kitt Peak	Spacewatch	EOS	2.9 km	MPC · JPL
259451	2003 SP_{68}	—	September 17, 2003	Kitt Peak	Spacewatch	·	1.6 km	MPC · JPL
259452	2003 SQ_{70}	—	September 17, 2003	Haleakala	NEAT	·	970 m	MPC · JPL
259453	2003 SD_{73}	—	September 18, 2003	Kitt Peak	Spacewatch	NYS	1.2 km	MPC · JPL
259454	2003 ST_{77}	—	September 19, 2003	Kitt Peak	Spacewatch	·	1.0 km	MPC · JPL
259455	2003 SU_{82}	—	September 18, 2003	Kitt Peak	Spacewatch	NYS	1.0 km	MPC · JPL
259456	2003 SH_{88}	—	September 18, 2003	Campo Imperatore	CINEOS	·	3.4 km	MPC · JPL
259457	2003 SY_{88}	—	September 18, 2003	Anderson Mesa	LONEOS	·	4.9 km	MPC · JPL
259458	2003 SJ_{90}	—	September 18, 2003	Socorro	LINEAR	·	840 m	MPC · JPL
259459	2003 SY_{95}	—	September 19, 2003	Palomar	NEAT	·	1.1 km	MPC · JPL
259460	2003 SZ_{100}	—	September 20, 2003	Socorro	LINEAR	·	3.7 km	MPC · JPL
259461	2003 SN_{101}	—	September 20, 2003	Palomar	NEAT	·	980 m	MPC · JPL
259462	2003 SB_{104}	—	September 20, 2003	Socorro	LINEAR	·	890 m	MPC · JPL
259463	2003 SS_{107}	—	September 20, 2003	Palomar	NEAT	CYB	6.4 km	MPC · JPL
259464	2003 SN_{117}	—	September 16, 2003	Kitt Peak	Spacewatch	·	1.5 km	MPC · JPL
259465	2003 SM_{123}	—	September 18, 2003	Palomar	NEAT	·	1.0 km	MPC · JPL
259466	2003 SP_{123}	—	September 18, 2003	Palomar	NEAT	·	1.7 km	MPC · JPL
259467	2003 SD_{142}	—	September 20, 2003	Socorro	LINEAR	·	810 m	MPC · JPL
259468	2003 SW_{143}	—	September 21, 2003	Socorro	LINEAR	·	790 m	MPC · JPL
259469	2003 SQ_{145}	—	September 20, 2003	Socorro	LINEAR	·	940 m	MPC · JPL
259470	2003 SD_{151}	—	September 17, 2003	Socorro	LINEAR	·	1.1 km	MPC · JPL
259471	2003 SD_{154}	—	September 19, 2003	Anderson Mesa	LONEOS	·	1.1 km	MPC · JPL
259472	2003 SA_{168}	—	September 23, 2003	Haleakala	NEAT	V	1.1 km	MPC · JPL
259473	2003 SS_{169}	—	September 23, 2003	Haleakala	NEAT	·	1.0 km	MPC · JPL
259474	2003 SX_{169}	—	September 23, 2003	Haleakala	NEAT	·	1.3 km	MPC · JPL
259475	2003 SR_{173}	—	September 18, 2003	Palomar	NEAT	HYG	4.9 km	MPC · JPL
259476	2003 SW_{179}	—	September 19, 2003	Socorro	LINEAR	·	5.7 km	MPC · JPL
259477	2003 SM_{184}	—	September 21, 2003	Kitt Peak	Spacewatch	·	710 m	MPC · JPL
259478	2003 SU_{186}	—	September 22, 2003	Anderson Mesa	LONEOS	·	1.5 km	MPC · JPL
259479	2003 SZ_{198}	—	September 21, 2003	Anderson Mesa	LONEOS	·	1.2 km	MPC · JPL
259480	2003 SN_{200}	—	September 25, 2003	Črni Vrh	Mikuž, H.	PHO	2.4 km	MPC · JPL
259481	2003 SY_{200}	—	September 25, 2003	Kleť	J. Tichá, M. Tichý	·	6.7 km	MPC · JPL
259482	2003 SU_{202}	—	September 22, 2003	Anderson Mesa	LONEOS	·	980 m	MPC · JPL
259483	2003 SZ_{210}	—	September 23, 2003	Palomar	NEAT	EOS	3.2 km	MPC · JPL
259484	2003 SF_{212}	—	September 25, 2003	Palomar	NEAT	·	1.2 km	MPC · JPL
259485	2003 SS_{215}	—	September 24, 2003	Palomar	NEAT	·	940 m	MPC · JPL
259486	2003 SH_{220}	—	September 27, 2003	Desert Eagle	W. K. Y. Yeung	·	870 m	MPC · JPL
259487	2003 SZ_{221}	—	September 26, 2003	Socorro	LINEAR	·	1.1 km	MPC · JPL
259488	2003 SK_{224}	—	September 25, 2003	Bergisch Gladbach	W. Bickel	·	750 m	MPC · JPL
259489	2003 ST_{227}	—	September 27, 2003	Socorro	LINEAR	·	1.3 km	MPC · JPL
259490	2003 SW_{228}	—	September 26, 2003	Socorro	LINEAR	·	1.1 km	MPC · JPL
259491	2003 SD_{229}	—	September 27, 2003	Kitt Peak	Spacewatch	·	1.6 km	MPC · JPL
259492	2003 SE_{230}	—	September 24, 2003	Palomar	NEAT	·	770 m	MPC · JPL
259493	2003 SE_{233}	—	September 25, 2003	Palomar	NEAT	·	960 m	MPC · JPL
259494	2003 SQ_{237}	—	September 26, 2003	Socorro	LINEAR	·	890 m	MPC · JPL
259495	2003 SJ_{247}	—	September 26, 2003	Socorro	LINEAR	THM	3.2 km	MPC · JPL
259496	2003 ST_{250}	—	September 26, 2003	Socorro	LINEAR	·	1.0 km	MPC · JPL
259497	2003 SV_{252}	—	September 27, 2003	Socorro	LINEAR	·	1.0 km	MPC · JPL
259498	2003 SB_{257}	—	September 28, 2003	Kitt Peak	Spacewatch	NYS	1.2 km	MPC · JPL
259499	2003 SR_{258}	—	September 28, 2003	Kitt Peak	Spacewatch	NYS	1.6 km	MPC · JPL
259500	2003 SS_{262}	—	September 28, 2003	Socorro	LINEAR	V	960 m	MPC · JPL

== 259501–259600 ==
back to top

Designation			Discovery			Properties		Ref
Permanent	Provisional	Named after	Date	Site	Discoverer(s)	Category	Diam.	Ref
259501	2003 SP_{277}	—	September 30, 2003	Socorro	LINEAR	·	980 m	MPC · JPL
259502	2003 SL_{284}	—	September 20, 2003	Socorro	LINEAR	·	860 m	MPC · JPL
259503	2003 SG_{286}	—	September 21, 2003	Palomar	NEAT	·	1.1 km	MPC · JPL
259504	2003 SD_{290}	—	September 28, 2003	Anderson Mesa	LONEOS	·	1.0 km	MPC · JPL
259505	2003 SB_{300}	—	September 17, 2003	Palomar	NEAT	·	1.1 km	MPC · JPL
259506	2003 SC_{301}	—	September 17, 2003	Palomar	NEAT	·	710 m	MPC · JPL
259507	2003 SL_{308}	—	September 29, 2003	Anderson Mesa	LONEOS	·	900 m	MPC · JPL
259508	2003 SF_{324}	—	September 17, 2003	Kitt Peak	Spacewatch	·	3.2 km	MPC · JPL
259509	2003 SL_{331}	—	September 26, 2003	Apache Point	SDSS	·	2.1 km	MPC · JPL
259510	2003 SB_{332}	—	September 27, 2003	Apache Point	SDSS	·	1.4 km	MPC · JPL
259511	2003 SU_{333}	—	September 26, 2003	Apache Point	SDSS	CYB	4.7 km	MPC · JPL
259512	2003 SD_{336}	—	September 26, 2003	Apache Point	SDSS	·	1.1 km	MPC · JPL
259513	2003 SC_{339}	—	September 26, 2003	Apache Point	SDSS	·	1.4 km	MPC · JPL
259514	2003 SK_{401}	—	September 26, 2003	Apache Point	SDSS	·	5.2 km	MPC · JPL
259515	2003 SM_{404}	—	September 27, 2003	Apache Point	SDSS	V	830 m	MPC · JPL
259516	2003 SL_{431}	—	September 26, 2003	Apache Point	SDSS	·	1.8 km	MPC · JPL
259517	2003 TM_{13}	—	October 14, 2003	Anderson Mesa	LONEOS	·	1.1 km	MPC · JPL
259518	2003 TV_{14}	—	October 14, 2003	Anderson Mesa	LONEOS	·	1.1 km	MPC · JPL
259519	2003 TA_{17}	—	October 14, 2003	Anderson Mesa	LONEOS	·	1.6 km	MPC · JPL
259520	2003 TN_{28}	—	October 1, 2003	Kitt Peak	Spacewatch	·	4.1 km	MPC · JPL
259521	2003 TV_{43}	—	October 2, 2003	Kitt Peak	Spacewatch	·	1.1 km	MPC · JPL
259522	2003 TM_{49}	—	October 3, 2003	Kitt Peak	Spacewatch	·	1.4 km	MPC · JPL
259523	2003 UA_{24}	—	October 23, 2003	Junk Bond	Junk Bond	3:2	6.0 km	MPC · JPL
259524	2003 UQ_{29}	—	October 21, 2003	Fountain Hills	Hills, Fountain	·	1.7 km	MPC · JPL
259525	2003 UH_{35}	—	October 16, 2003	Kitt Peak	Spacewatch	·	1.0 km	MPC · JPL
259526	2003 UL_{40}	—	October 16, 2003	Kitt Peak	Spacewatch	·	1.6 km	MPC · JPL
259527	2003 UH_{41}	—	October 16, 2003	Haleakala	NEAT	·	1.1 km	MPC · JPL
259528	2003 UV_{42}	—	October 17, 2003	Kitt Peak	Spacewatch	·	570 m	MPC · JPL
259529	2003 US_{47}	—	October 25, 2003	Kitt Peak	Spacewatch	·	1.8 km	MPC · JPL
259530	2003 UF_{51}	—	October 18, 2003	Palomar	NEAT	·	5.7 km	MPC · JPL
259531	2003 UL_{53}	—	October 18, 2003	Palomar	NEAT	·	960 m	MPC · JPL
259532	2003 UK_{61}	—	October 16, 2003	Anderson Mesa	LONEOS	·	800 m	MPC · JPL
259533	2003 UY_{61}	—	October 16, 2003	Anderson Mesa	LONEOS	·	920 m	MPC · JPL
259534	2003 UL_{62}	—	October 16, 2003	Anderson Mesa	LONEOS	·	960 m	MPC · JPL
259535	2003 UW_{62}	—	October 16, 2003	Palomar	NEAT	·	920 m	MPC · JPL
259536	2003 UV_{63}	—	October 16, 2003	Anderson Mesa	LONEOS	·	1.1 km	MPC · JPL
259537	2003 UT_{74}	—	October 17, 2003	Kitt Peak	Spacewatch	·	920 m	MPC · JPL
259538	2003 UV_{78}	—	October 18, 2003	Kitt Peak	Spacewatch	·	940 m	MPC · JPL
259539	2003 UL_{79}	—	October 19, 2003	Anderson Mesa	LONEOS	·	3.9 km	MPC · JPL
259540	2003 UR_{79}	—	October 19, 2003	Kitt Peak	Spacewatch	MAS	1.2 km	MPC · JPL
259541	2003 UW_{83}	—	October 18, 2003	Palomar	NEAT	·	5.9 km	MPC · JPL
259542	2003 UW_{86}	—	October 18, 2003	Palomar	NEAT	·	1.5 km	MPC · JPL
259543	2003 US_{95}	—	October 18, 2003	Kitt Peak	Spacewatch	·	900 m	MPC · JPL
259544	2003 UN_{98}	—	October 19, 2003	Anderson Mesa	LONEOS	·	1.3 km	MPC · JPL
259545	2003 UQ_{98}	—	October 19, 2003	Anderson Mesa	LONEOS	V	1.0 km	MPC · JPL
259546	2003 UX_{101}	—	October 20, 2003	Socorro	LINEAR	PHO	990 m	MPC · JPL
259547	2003 UW_{109}	—	October 19, 2003	Kitt Peak	Spacewatch	·	760 m	MPC · JPL
259548	2003 UZ_{121}	—	October 19, 2003	Socorro	LINEAR	slow	2.1 km	MPC · JPL
259549	2003 UL_{125}	—	October 20, 2003	Socorro	LINEAR	·	950 m	MPC · JPL
259550	2003 UZ_{127}	—	October 21, 2003	Kitt Peak	Spacewatch	·	950 m	MPC · JPL
259551	2003 UF_{135}	—	October 21, 2003	Anderson Mesa	LONEOS	·	960 m	MPC · JPL
259552	2003 UR_{139}	—	October 16, 2003	Anderson Mesa	LONEOS	·	980 m	MPC · JPL
259553	2003 UO_{144}	—	October 18, 2003	Anderson Mesa	LONEOS	·	2.1 km	MPC · JPL
259554	2003 UE_{145}	—	October 18, 2003	Anderson Mesa	LONEOS	NYS	1.4 km	MPC · JPL
259555	2003 UL_{147}	—	October 18, 2003	Anderson Mesa	LONEOS	·	1.3 km	MPC · JPL
259556	2003 UN_{148}	—	October 19, 2003	Anderson Mesa	LONEOS	·	1.0 km	MPC · JPL
259557	2003 UF_{153}	—	October 21, 2003	Palomar	NEAT	PHO	1.2 km	MPC · JPL
259558	2003 UV_{155}	—	October 20, 2003	Kitt Peak	Spacewatch	·	1.5 km	MPC · JPL
259559	2003 UD_{158}	—	October 20, 2003	Kitt Peak	Spacewatch	NYS	1.3 km	MPC · JPL
259560	2003 UH_{158}	—	October 20, 2003	Palomar	NEAT	·	1.9 km	MPC · JPL
259561	2003 UG_{162}	—	October 21, 2003	Socorro	LINEAR	V	830 m	MPC · JPL
259562	2003 UZ_{162}	—	October 21, 2003	Socorro	LINEAR	·	2.0 km	MPC · JPL
259563	2003 UD_{165}	—	October 21, 2003	Palomar	NEAT	·	1.1 km	MPC · JPL
259564	2003 UX_{165}	—	October 21, 2003	Kitt Peak	Spacewatch	·	750 m	MPC · JPL
259565	2003 UF_{167}	—	October 22, 2003	Socorro	LINEAR	·	1.1 km	MPC · JPL
259566	2003 UO_{170}	—	October 22, 2003	Kitt Peak	Spacewatch	·	830 m	MPC · JPL
259567	2003 UJ_{173}	—	October 20, 2003	Palomar	NEAT	·	1.7 km	MPC · JPL
259568	2003 UH_{177}	—	October 21, 2003	Palomar	NEAT	·	1.1 km	MPC · JPL
259569	2003 UC_{180}	—	October 21, 2003	Socorro	LINEAR	NYS	1.3 km	MPC · JPL
259570	2003 UC_{181}	—	October 21, 2003	Socorro	LINEAR	·	1.6 km	MPC · JPL
259571	2003 UW_{184}	—	October 21, 2003	Kitt Peak	Spacewatch	·	960 m	MPC · JPL
259572	2003 UA_{185}	—	October 21, 2003	Palomar	NEAT	·	930 m	MPC · JPL
259573	2003 UA_{186}	—	October 22, 2003	Socorro	LINEAR	·	980 m	MPC · JPL
259574	2003 UT_{186}	—	October 22, 2003	Kitt Peak	Spacewatch	·	770 m	MPC · JPL
259575	2003 UF_{187}	—	October 22, 2003	Palomar	NEAT	·	1.8 km	MPC · JPL
259576	2003 UQ_{188}	—	October 22, 2003	Kitt Peak	Spacewatch	·	1.8 km	MPC · JPL
259577	2003 UK_{193}	—	October 20, 2003	Kitt Peak	Spacewatch	HYG	4.4 km	MPC · JPL
259578	2003 UO_{197}	—	October 21, 2003	Anderson Mesa	LONEOS	·	800 m	MPC · JPL
259579	2003 UH_{202}	—	October 21, 2003	Socorro	LINEAR	·	1.2 km	MPC · JPL
259580	2003 UQ_{208}	—	October 22, 2003	Kitt Peak	Spacewatch	·	1.5 km	MPC · JPL
259581	2003 UF_{211}	—	October 23, 2003	Kitt Peak	Spacewatch	·	1.4 km	MPC · JPL
259582	2003 UH_{214}	—	October 24, 2003	Socorro	LINEAR	·	1.6 km	MPC · JPL
259583	2003 UT_{217}	—	October 21, 2003	Socorro	LINEAR	HYG	3.4 km	MPC · JPL
259584	2003 UH_{218}	—	October 21, 2003	Socorro	LINEAR	NYS	2.0 km	MPC · JPL
259585	2003 UG_{220}	—	October 21, 2003	Kitt Peak	Spacewatch	V	970 m	MPC · JPL
259586	2003 UM_{220}	—	October 21, 2003	Kitt Peak	Spacewatch	·	1.2 km	MPC · JPL
259587	2003 UX_{229}	—	October 23, 2003	Anderson Mesa	LONEOS	NYS	880 m	MPC · JPL
259588	2003 UF_{232}	—	October 24, 2003	Kitt Peak	Spacewatch	MAS	840 m	MPC · JPL
259589	2003 UV_{235}	—	October 22, 2003	Kitt Peak	Spacewatch	·	1.4 km	MPC · JPL
259590	2003 UA_{238}	—	October 23, 2003	Haleakala	NEAT	·	1.1 km	MPC · JPL
259591	2003 UV_{244}	—	October 24, 2003	Kitt Peak	Spacewatch	T_{j} (2.98) · 3:2 · SHU	4.9 km	MPC · JPL
259592	2003 UX_{244}	—	October 24, 2003	Kitt Peak	Spacewatch	·	3.0 km	MPC · JPL
259593	2003 UZ_{244}	—	October 24, 2003	Kitt Peak	Spacewatch	·	1.6 km	MPC · JPL
259594	2003 UM_{248}	—	October 25, 2003	Kitt Peak	Spacewatch	·	1.4 km	MPC · JPL
259595	2003 UX_{250}	—	October 25, 2003	Socorro	LINEAR	·	950 m	MPC · JPL
259596	2003 UZ_{259}	—	October 25, 2003	Kitt Peak	Spacewatch	·	970 m	MPC · JPL
259597	2003 UQ_{268}	—	October 28, 2003	Socorro	LINEAR	NYS	1.3 km	MPC · JPL
259598	2003 UE_{270}	—	October 23, 2003	Bergisch Gladbach	W. Bickel	·	780 m	MPC · JPL
259599	2003 UO_{272}	—	October 29, 2003	Socorro	LINEAR	NYS	1.6 km	MPC · JPL
259600	2003 UU_{272}	—	October 29, 2003	Socorro	LINEAR	·	890 m	MPC · JPL

== 259601–259700 ==
back to top

Designation			Discovery			Properties		Ref
Permanent	Provisional	Named after	Date	Site	Discoverer(s)	Category	Diam.	Ref
259601	2003 UF_{274}	—	October 30, 2003	Socorro	LINEAR	·	790 m	MPC · JPL
259602	2003 UO_{274}	—	October 30, 2003	Socorro	LINEAR	V	1.0 km	MPC · JPL
259603	2003 UZ_{276}	—	October 30, 2003	Socorro	LINEAR	CYB	6.2 km	MPC · JPL
259604	2003 UW_{279}	—	October 27, 2003	Kitt Peak	Spacewatch	·	1.6 km	MPC · JPL
259605	2003 UK_{280}	—	October 27, 2003	Socorro	LINEAR	·	1.0 km	MPC · JPL
259606	2003 UW_{282}	—	October 29, 2003	Anderson Mesa	LONEOS	·	1.0 km	MPC · JPL
259607	2003 UB_{283}	—	October 29, 2003	Anderson Mesa	LONEOS	·	1.1 km	MPC · JPL
259608	2003 UW_{289}	—	October 23, 2003	Kitt Peak	M. W. Buie	·	960 m	MPC · JPL
259609	2003 UN_{291}	—	October 24, 2003	Kitt Peak	M. W. Buie	·	1.1 km	MPC · JPL
259610	2003 US_{296}	—	October 16, 2003	Kitt Peak	Spacewatch	·	660 m	MPC · JPL
259611	2003 UU_{331}	—	October 18, 2003	Apache Point	SDSS	PHO	820 m	MPC · JPL
259612	2003 US_{367}	—	October 21, 2003	Kitt Peak	Spacewatch	·	1.2 km	MPC · JPL
259613	2003 UR_{375}	—	October 22, 2003	Apache Point	SDSS	·	1.3 km	MPC · JPL
259614	2003 UO_{380}	—	October 22, 2003	Apache Point	SDSS	·	930 m	MPC · JPL
259615	2003 VZ_{2}	—	November 14, 2003	Wrightwood	J. W. Young	·	1.8 km	MPC · JPL
259616	2003 VC_{6}	—	November 14, 2003	Palomar	NEAT	·	1.2 km	MPC · JPL
259617	2003 VL_{6}	—	November 15, 2003	Palomar	NEAT	·	1.0 km	MPC · JPL
259618	2003 VA_{8}	—	November 15, 2003	Junk Bond	D. Healy	·	1.1 km	MPC · JPL
259619	2003 VM_{11}	—	November 15, 2003	Palomar	NEAT	·	1.1 km	MPC · JPL
259620	2003 WX	—	November 16, 2003	Catalina	CSS	·	1.5 km	MPC · JPL
259621	2003 WY	—	November 16, 2003	Catalina	CSS	·	820 m	MPC · JPL
259622	2003 WU_{2}	—	November 16, 2003	Catalina	CSS	NYS	1.5 km	MPC · JPL
259623	2003 WP_{16}	—	November 18, 2003	Palomar	NEAT	·	800 m	MPC · JPL
259624	2003 WN_{20}	—	November 19, 2003	Socorro	LINEAR	·	1.5 km	MPC · JPL
259625	2003 WS_{25}	—	November 20, 2003	Kitt Peak	Spacewatch	BAR	1.9 km	MPC · JPL
259626	2003 WB_{29}	—	November 18, 2003	Palomar	NEAT	·	1.1 km	MPC · JPL
259627	2003 WU_{31}	—	November 18, 2003	Palomar	NEAT	·	830 m	MPC · JPL
259628	2003 WM_{32}	—	November 18, 2003	Kitt Peak	Spacewatch	·	840 m	MPC · JPL
259629	2003 WK_{33}	—	November 18, 2003	Kitt Peak	Spacewatch	·	1.5 km	MPC · JPL
259630	2003 WB_{34}	—	November 19, 2003	Kitt Peak	Spacewatch	V	780 m	MPC · JPL
259631	2003 WF_{34}	—	November 19, 2003	Kitt Peak	Spacewatch	·	1.8 km	MPC · JPL
259632	2003 WZ_{34}	—	November 19, 2003	Kitt Peak	Spacewatch	·	1.1 km	MPC · JPL
259633	2003 WB_{35}	—	November 19, 2003	Kitt Peak	Spacewatch	·	1.8 km	MPC · JPL
259634	2003 WF_{36}	—	November 19, 2003	Kitt Peak	Spacewatch	NYS	1.3 km	MPC · JPL
259635	2003 WY_{38}	—	November 19, 2003	Kitt Peak	Spacewatch	·	1.1 km	MPC · JPL
259636	2003 WV_{40}	—	November 19, 2003	Kitt Peak	Spacewatch	NYS	1.6 km	MPC · JPL
259637	2003 WY_{41}	—	November 20, 2003	Socorro	LINEAR	·	1.7 km	MPC · JPL
259638	2003 WA_{42}	—	November 20, 2003	Needville	Needville	·	1.1 km	MPC · JPL
259639	2003 WF_{45}	—	November 19, 2003	Palomar	NEAT	·	1.0 km	MPC · JPL
259640	2003 WQ_{48}	—	November 19, 2003	Kitt Peak	Spacewatch	·	870 m	MPC · JPL
259641	2003 WG_{60}	—	November 18, 2003	Palomar	NEAT	·	1.1 km	MPC · JPL
259642	2003 WS_{64}	—	November 19, 2003	Kitt Peak	Spacewatch	·	860 m	MPC · JPL
259643	2003 WB_{74}	—	November 20, 2003	Socorro	LINEAR	NYS	1.6 km	MPC · JPL
259644	2003 WH_{79}	—	November 20, 2003	Socorro	LINEAR	·	1.2 km	MPC · JPL
259645	2003 WJ_{81}	—	November 20, 2003	Socorro	LINEAR	·	1.4 km	MPC · JPL
259646	2003 WB_{82}	—	November 19, 2003	Socorro	LINEAR	·	1.0 km	MPC · JPL
259647	2003 WX_{82}	—	November 20, 2003	Palomar	NEAT	PHO	3.7 km	MPC · JPL
259648	2003 WR_{89}	—	November 16, 2003	Kitt Peak	Spacewatch	NYS	910 m	MPC · JPL
259649	2003 WU_{92}	—	November 19, 2003	Anderson Mesa	LONEOS	·	1.7 km	MPC · JPL
259650	2003 WH_{103}	—	November 21, 2003	Socorro	LINEAR	·	1.3 km	MPC · JPL
259651	2003 WY_{103}	—	November 21, 2003	Socorro	LINEAR	·	680 m	MPC · JPL
259652	2003 WL_{106}	—	November 21, 2003	Socorro	LINEAR	PHO	1.5 km	MPC · JPL
259653	2003 WS_{114}	—	November 20, 2003	Socorro	LINEAR	·	1.0 km	MPC · JPL
259654	2003 WC_{116}	—	November 20, 2003	Socorro	LINEAR	·	1.1 km	MPC · JPL
259655	2003 WX_{116}	—	November 20, 2003	Socorro	LINEAR	·	1.3 km	MPC · JPL
259656	2003 WH_{117}	—	November 20, 2003	Socorro	LINEAR	·	1.1 km	MPC · JPL
259657	2003 WY_{117}	—	November 20, 2003	Socorro	LINEAR	·	1.1 km	MPC · JPL
259658	2003 WG_{118}	—	November 20, 2003	Socorro	LINEAR	·	2.0 km	MPC · JPL
259659	2003 WU_{124}	—	November 20, 2003	Socorro	LINEAR	PHO	1.4 km	MPC · JPL
259660	2003 WS_{129}	—	November 21, 2003	Palomar	NEAT	·	1.3 km	MPC · JPL
259661	2003 WO_{131}	—	November 21, 2003	Palomar	NEAT	·	1.1 km	MPC · JPL
259662	2003 WG_{134}	—	November 21, 2003	Socorro	LINEAR	·	1.1 km	MPC · JPL
259663	2003 WE_{136}	—	November 21, 2003	Socorro	LINEAR	·	920 m	MPC · JPL
259664	2003 WH_{138}	—	November 21, 2003	Socorro	LINEAR	·	1.2 km	MPC · JPL
259665	2003 WW_{138}	—	November 21, 2003	Socorro	LINEAR	·	1.4 km	MPC · JPL
259666	2003 WU_{143}	—	November 20, 2003	Socorro	LINEAR	·	1.6 km	MPC · JPL
259667	2003 WZ_{145}	—	November 21, 2003	Socorro	LINEAR	·	1.4 km	MPC · JPL
259668	2003 WM_{147}	—	November 23, 2003	Kitt Peak	Spacewatch	·	1.2 km	MPC · JPL
259669	2003 WZ_{162}	—	November 30, 2003	Kitt Peak	Spacewatch	·	1.0 km	MPC · JPL
259670	2003 WM_{164}	—	November 30, 2003	Kitt Peak	Spacewatch	NYS	1.3 km	MPC · JPL
259671	2003 WW_{164}	—	November 30, 2003	Kitt Peak	Spacewatch	·	790 m	MPC · JPL
259672	2003 WL_{165}	—	October 1, 1999	Kitt Peak	Spacewatch	·	1.1 km	MPC · JPL
259673	2003 WR_{170}	—	November 21, 2003	Catalina	CSS	PHO	1.1 km	MPC · JPL
259674	2003 WG_{182}	—	November 22, 2003	Kitt Peak	M. W. Buie	·	1.2 km	MPC · JPL
259675	2003 XF_{2}	—	December 1, 2003	Socorro	LINEAR	·	1.7 km	MPC · JPL
259676	2003 XK_{3}	—	December 1, 2003	Socorro	LINEAR	·	2.1 km	MPC · JPL
259677	2003 XC_{8}	—	December 4, 2003	Socorro	LINEAR	·	1.2 km	MPC · JPL
259678	2003 XF_{8}	—	December 4, 2003	Socorro	LINEAR	·	2.8 km	MPC · JPL
259679	2003 XO_{10}	—	December 1, 2003	Socorro	LINEAR	HNS	1.9 km	MPC · JPL
259680	2003 XC_{11}	—	December 13, 2003	Wrightwood	J. W. Young	·	1.3 km	MPC · JPL
259681	2003 XG_{13}	—	December 14, 2003	Kitt Peak	Spacewatch	·	990 m	MPC · JPL
259682	2003 XV_{13}	—	December 14, 2003	Palomar	NEAT	NYS	1.1 km	MPC · JPL
259683	2003 XE_{15}	—	December 15, 2003	Junk Bond	Junk Bond	·	1.7 km	MPC · JPL
259684	2003 XU_{16}	—	December 14, 2003	Kitt Peak	Spacewatch	NYS	920 m	MPC · JPL
259685	2003 XS_{18}	—	December 15, 2003	Palomar	NEAT	·	1.4 km	MPC · JPL
259686	2003 XY_{18}	—	December 14, 2003	Kitt Peak	Spacewatch	·	2.4 km	MPC · JPL
259687	2003 XA_{20}	—	December 14, 2003	Kitt Peak	Spacewatch	·	2.2 km	MPC · JPL
259688	2003 XN_{21}	—	December 14, 2003	Kitt Peak	Spacewatch	·	1.0 km	MPC · JPL
259689	2003 XW_{36}	—	December 3, 2003	Socorro	LINEAR	V	900 m	MPC · JPL
259690	2003 XS_{38}	—	December 4, 2003	Socorro	LINEAR	·	1.1 km	MPC · JPL
259691	2003 YV_{2}	—	December 18, 2003	Socorro	LINEAR	·	2.1 km	MPC · JPL
259692	2003 YG_{9}	—	December 16, 2003	Kitt Peak	Spacewatch	·	1.9 km	MPC · JPL
259693	2003 YG_{11}	—	December 17, 2003	Socorro	LINEAR	·	1.2 km	MPC · JPL
259694	2003 YD_{17}	—	December 17, 2003	Kitt Peak	Spacewatch	·	3.0 km	MPC · JPL
259695	2003 YL_{17}	—	December 17, 2003	Kitt Peak	Spacewatch	·	940 m	MPC · JPL
259696	2003 YB_{20}	—	December 17, 2003	Kitt Peak	Spacewatch	·	1.6 km	MPC · JPL
259697	2003 YC_{21}	—	December 17, 2003	Kitt Peak	Spacewatch	MAS	840 m	MPC · JPL
259698	2003 YJ_{23}	—	December 17, 2003	Kitt Peak	Spacewatch	·	850 m	MPC · JPL
259699	2003 YY_{28}	—	December 17, 2003	Kitt Peak	Spacewatch	V	930 m	MPC · JPL
259700	2003 YD_{31}	—	December 18, 2003	Socorro	LINEAR	·	1.2 km	MPC · JPL

== 259701–259800 ==
back to top

Designation			Discovery			Properties		Ref
Permanent	Provisional	Named after	Date	Site	Discoverer(s)	Category	Diam.	Ref
259701	2003 YA_{33}	—	December 16, 2003	Catalina	CSS	ERI	1.8 km	MPC · JPL
259702	2003 YL_{34}	—	December 18, 2003	Socorro	LINEAR	·	840 m	MPC · JPL
259703	2003 YP_{34}	—	December 18, 2003	Socorro	LINEAR	ERI	1.9 km	MPC · JPL
259704	2003 YX_{35}	—	December 19, 2003	Kitt Peak	Spacewatch	(2076)	1.5 km	MPC · JPL
259705	2003 YO_{40}	—	December 19, 2003	Kitt Peak	Spacewatch	DOR	2.8 km	MPC · JPL
259706	2003 YP_{42}	—	December 19, 2003	Kitt Peak	Spacewatch	·	1.3 km	MPC · JPL
259707	2003 YN_{43}	—	December 19, 2003	Socorro	LINEAR	NYS	1.7 km	MPC · JPL
259708	2003 YV_{44}	—	December 19, 2003	Kitt Peak	Spacewatch	·	1.2 km	MPC · JPL
259709	2003 YP_{47}	—	December 18, 2003	Socorro	LINEAR	V	1.1 km	MPC · JPL
259710	2003 YH_{50}	—	December 18, 2003	Socorro	LINEAR	NYS	1.3 km	MPC · JPL
259711	2003 YL_{54}	—	December 19, 2003	Socorro	LINEAR	·	1.2 km	MPC · JPL
259712	2003 YW_{55}	—	December 19, 2003	Socorro	LINEAR	(2076)	1.4 km	MPC · JPL
259713	2003 YH_{60}	—	December 19, 2003	Kitt Peak	Spacewatch	·	1.6 km	MPC · JPL
259714	2003 YB_{62}	—	December 19, 2003	Socorro	LINEAR	·	1.2 km	MPC · JPL
259715	2003 YF_{62}	—	December 19, 2003	Socorro	LINEAR	·	1.1 km	MPC · JPL
259716	2003 YN_{64}	—	December 19, 2003	Socorro	LINEAR	·	1.4 km	MPC · JPL
259717	2003 YS_{72}	—	December 18, 2003	Socorro	LINEAR	·	840 m	MPC · JPL
259718	2003 YT_{73}	—	December 18, 2003	Kitt Peak	Spacewatch	·	1.0 km	MPC · JPL
259719	2003 YL_{75}	—	December 18, 2003	Socorro	LINEAR	·	1.4 km	MPC · JPL
259720	2003 YV_{79}	—	December 18, 2003	Socorro	LINEAR	·	1.1 km	MPC · JPL
259721	2003 YC_{86}	—	December 19, 2003	Socorro	LINEAR	·	1.6 km	MPC · JPL
259722	2003 YE_{87}	—	December 19, 2003	Socorro	LINEAR	·	1.8 km	MPC · JPL
259723	2003 YG_{87}	—	December 19, 2003	Socorro	LINEAR	·	1.6 km	MPC · JPL
259724	2003 YQ_{88}	—	December 19, 2003	Socorro	LINEAR	(5)	1.6 km	MPC · JPL
259725	2003 YB_{90}	—	December 19, 2003	Kitt Peak	Spacewatch	NYS	1.3 km	MPC · JPL
259726	2003 YV_{93}	—	December 21, 2003	Socorro	LINEAR	·	1.1 km	MPC · JPL
259727	2003 YC_{94}	—	December 21, 2003	Kitt Peak	Spacewatch	·	1.4 km	MPC · JPL
259728	2003 YM_{96}	—	December 19, 2003	Socorro	LINEAR	NYS	1.1 km	MPC · JPL
259729	2003 YN_{96}	—	December 19, 2003	Socorro	LINEAR	·	1.2 km	MPC · JPL
259730	2003 YN_{97}	—	December 19, 2003	Socorro	LINEAR	·	1.4 km	MPC · JPL
259731	2003 YK_{101}	—	December 19, 2003	Socorro	LINEAR	EUN	2.0 km	MPC · JPL
259732	2003 YS_{102}	—	December 19, 2003	Socorro	LINEAR	·	2.5 km	MPC · JPL
259733	2003 YR_{104}	—	December 21, 2003	Kitt Peak	Spacewatch	·	1.7 km	MPC · JPL
259734	2003 YK_{112}	—	December 23, 2003	Socorro	LINEAR	·	1.6 km	MPC · JPL
259735	2003 YU_{112}	—	December 23, 2003	Socorro	LINEAR	·	1.1 km	MPC · JPL
259736	2003 YP_{114}	—	December 25, 2003	Haleakala	NEAT	·	970 m	MPC · JPL
259737	2003 YB_{128}	—	December 27, 2003	Socorro	LINEAR	·	1.3 km	MPC · JPL
259738	2003 YC_{135}	—	December 28, 2003	Socorro	LINEAR	PHO	1.8 km	MPC · JPL
259739	2003 YT_{150}	—	December 29, 2003	Catalina	CSS	·	1.9 km	MPC · JPL
259740	2003 YD_{152}	—	December 29, 2003	Socorro	LINEAR	·	1.0 km	MPC · JPL
259741	2003 YF_{155}	—	December 30, 2003	Socorro	LINEAR	·	3.8 km	MPC · JPL
259742	2003 YU_{159}	—	December 17, 2003	Socorro	LINEAR	·	2.3 km	MPC · JPL
259743	2003 YK_{162}	—	December 17, 2003	Anderson Mesa	LONEOS	·	1.7 km	MPC · JPL
259744	2003 YT_{166}	—	December 17, 2003	Kitt Peak	Spacewatch	·	2.1 km	MPC · JPL
259745	2003 YB_{168}	—	December 18, 2003	Socorro	LINEAR	·	1.5 km	MPC · JPL
259746	2003 YP_{168}	—	December 18, 2003	Socorro	LINEAR	(2076)	1.1 km	MPC · JPL
259747	2003 YT_{168}	—	December 18, 2003	Socorro	LINEAR	PHO	1.5 km	MPC · JPL
259748	2003 YM_{170}	—	December 18, 2003	Kitt Peak	Spacewatch	·	2.2 km	MPC · JPL
259749	2003 YR_{171}	—	December 18, 2003	Kitt Peak	Spacewatch	·	1.2 km	MPC · JPL
259750	2003 YG_{180}	—	December 17, 2003	Socorro	LINEAR	·	1.6 km	MPC · JPL
259751	2003 YK_{181}	—	December 25, 2003	Apache Point	SDSS	·	2.0 km	MPC · JPL
259752	2003 YQ_{181}	—	December 21, 2003	Kitt Peak	Spacewatch	MAS	700 m	MPC · JPL
259753	2004 AY	—	January 5, 2004	Socorro	LINEAR	PHO	1.5 km	MPC · JPL
259754	2004 AZ_{3}	—	January 13, 2004	Anderson Mesa	LONEOS	NYS	1.7 km	MPC · JPL
259755	2004 AZ_{4}	—	January 13, 2004	Anderson Mesa	LONEOS	·	1.8 km	MPC · JPL
259756	2004 AU_{7}	—	January 13, 2004	Anderson Mesa	LONEOS	V	890 m	MPC · JPL
259757	2004 AO_{8}	—	January 15, 2004	Kitt Peak	Spacewatch	·	1.1 km	MPC · JPL
259758	2004 AY_{8}	—	January 14, 2004	Palomar	NEAT	·	3.0 km	MPC · JPL
259759	2004 AJ_{9}	—	January 14, 2004	Palomar	NEAT	·	1.4 km	MPC · JPL
259760	2004 AF_{23}	—	January 15, 2004	Kitt Peak	Spacewatch	·	2.3 km	MPC · JPL
259761	2004 BE_{1}	—	January 16, 2004	Kitt Peak	Spacewatch	·	1.0 km	MPC · JPL
259762	2004 BX_{2}	—	January 16, 2004	Palomar	NEAT	MAS	1 km	MPC · JPL
259763	2004 BR_{4}	—	January 16, 2004	Palomar	NEAT	·	1.3 km	MPC · JPL
259764	2004 BY_{4}	—	January 16, 2004	Palomar	NEAT	·	3.2 km	MPC · JPL
259765	2004 BK_{5}	—	January 16, 2004	Kitt Peak	Spacewatch	NYS	1.1 km	MPC · JPL
259766	2004 BA_{6}	—	January 16, 2004	Kitt Peak	Spacewatch	MAS	940 m	MPC · JPL
259767	2004 BR_{7}	—	January 16, 2004	Kitt Peak	Spacewatch	·	1.7 km	MPC · JPL
259768	2004 BE_{12}	—	January 16, 2004	Palomar	NEAT	MAS	1.2 km	MPC · JPL
259769	2004 BV_{12}	—	January 17, 2004	Palomar	NEAT	·	950 m	MPC · JPL
259770	2004 BL_{20}	—	January 16, 2004	Palomar	NEAT	·	2.4 km	MPC · JPL
259771	2004 BK_{21}	—	January 18, 2004	Kitt Peak	Spacewatch	·	1.9 km	MPC · JPL
259772	2004 BM_{21}	—	January 18, 2004	Kitt Peak	Spacewatch	·	1.5 km	MPC · JPL
259773	2004 BN_{21}	—	January 18, 2004	Kitt Peak	Spacewatch	NYS	1.5 km	MPC · JPL
259774	2004 BU_{22}	—	January 17, 2004	Kitt Peak	Spacewatch	·	1 km	MPC · JPL
259775	2004 BN_{24}	—	January 19, 2004	Anderson Mesa	LONEOS	·	1.7 km	MPC · JPL
259776	2004 BA_{27}	—	January 21, 2004	Socorro	LINEAR	·	2.9 km	MPC · JPL
259777	2004 BX_{27}	—	January 18, 2004	Palomar	NEAT	·	1.2 km	MPC · JPL
259778	2004 BH_{31}	—	January 18, 2004	Palomar	NEAT	·	1.1 km	MPC · JPL
259779	2004 BB_{32}	—	January 19, 2004	Kitt Peak	Spacewatch	·	1.3 km	MPC · JPL
259780	2004 BA_{35}	—	January 19, 2004	Kitt Peak	Spacewatch	·	1.4 km	MPC · JPL
259781	2004 BY_{36}	—	January 19, 2004	Kitt Peak	Spacewatch	·	1.6 km	MPC · JPL
259782	2004 BB_{40}	—	January 21, 2004	Socorro	LINEAR	·	1.0 km	MPC · JPL
259783	2004 BV_{40}	—	January 21, 2004	Socorro	LINEAR	·	850 m	MPC · JPL
259784	2004 BX_{41}	—	January 19, 2004	Catalina	CSS	·	1.4 km	MPC · JPL
259785	2004 BR_{43}	—	January 22, 2004	Socorro	LINEAR	·	1.5 km	MPC · JPL
259786	2004 BJ_{46}	—	January 21, 2004	Socorro	LINEAR	(5)	2.3 km	MPC · JPL
259787	2004 BU_{49}	—	January 21, 2004	Socorro	LINEAR	MAS	880 m	MPC · JPL
259788	2004 BX_{50}	—	January 21, 2004	Socorro	LINEAR	·	1.5 km	MPC · JPL
259789	2004 BB_{52}	—	January 21, 2004	Socorro	LINEAR	NYS	1.0 km	MPC · JPL
259790	2004 BH_{58}	—	January 23, 2004	Socorro	LINEAR	·	1.4 km	MPC · JPL
259791	2004 BD_{59}	—	January 23, 2004	Socorro	LINEAR	EUN	1.8 km	MPC · JPL
259792	2004 BK_{59}	—	January 24, 2004	Socorro	LINEAR	·	1.4 km	MPC · JPL
259793	2004 BM_{63}	—	January 22, 2004	Socorro	LINEAR	NYS	940 m	MPC · JPL
259794	2004 BU_{64}	—	January 22, 2004	Socorro	LINEAR	MAS	930 m	MPC · JPL
259795	2004 BK_{65}	—	January 22, 2004	Socorro	LINEAR	NYS	1.9 km	MPC · JPL
259796	2004 BH_{68}	—	January 23, 2004	Socorro	LINEAR	·	3.0 km	MPC · JPL
259797	2004 BX_{69}	—	January 21, 2004	Socorro	LINEAR	ERI	2.0 km	MPC · JPL
259798	2004 BT_{77}	—	January 22, 2004	Socorro	LINEAR	MAS	710 m	MPC · JPL
259799	2004 BH_{78}	—	January 22, 2004	Socorro	LINEAR	·	1.6 km	MPC · JPL
259800	2004 BV_{79}	—	January 24, 2004	Socorro	LINEAR	NYS	870 m	MPC · JPL

== 259801–259900 ==
back to top

Designation			Discovery			Properties		Ref
Permanent	Provisional	Named after	Date	Site	Discoverer(s)	Category	Diam.	Ref
259801	2004 BR_{81}	—	January 26, 2004	Anderson Mesa	LONEOS	3:2	11 km	MPC · JPL
259802	2004 BJ_{86}	—	January 30, 2004	Socorro	LINEAR	AMO	630 m	MPC · JPL
259803	2004 BH_{87}	—	January 23, 2004	Anderson Mesa	LONEOS	V	950 m	MPC · JPL
259804	2004 BU_{95}	—	January 19, 2004	Socorro	LINEAR	PHO	1.4 km	MPC · JPL
259805	2004 BW_{95}	—	January 27, 2004	Catalina	CSS	PHO	3.0 km	MPC · JPL
259806	2004 BL_{99}	—	January 27, 2004	Kitt Peak	Spacewatch	·	1.8 km	MPC · JPL
259807	2004 BT_{99}	—	January 27, 2004	Kitt Peak	Spacewatch	·	1.6 km	MPC · JPL
259808	2004 BZ_{99}	—	January 27, 2004	Kitt Peak	Spacewatch	·	1.3 km	MPC · JPL
259809	2004 BZ_{100}	—	January 28, 2004	Kitt Peak	Spacewatch	MAS	710 m	MPC · JPL
259810	2004 BQ_{105}	—	January 26, 2004	Anderson Mesa	LONEOS	·	1.6 km	MPC · JPL
259811	2004 BO_{106}	—	January 26, 2004	Anderson Mesa	LONEOS	V	950 m	MPC · JPL
259812	2004 BC_{108}	—	January 28, 2004	Catalina	CSS	·	1.7 km	MPC · JPL
259813	2004 BK_{109}	—	January 28, 2004	Catalina	CSS	·	2.4 km	MPC · JPL
259814	2004 BT_{109}	—	January 28, 2004	Kitt Peak	Spacewatch	MAS	960 m	MPC · JPL
259815	2004 BN_{111}	—	January 29, 2004	Catalina	CSS	BAR	2.3 km	MPC · JPL
259816	2004 BS_{114}	—	January 29, 2004	Anderson Mesa	LONEOS	·	1.6 km	MPC · JPL
259817	2004 BF_{117}	—	January 28, 2004	Catalina	CSS	EUN	1.8 km	MPC · JPL
259818	2004 BT_{117}	—	January 28, 2004	Haleakala	NEAT	·	3.3 km	MPC · JPL
259819	2004 BS_{120}	—	January 31, 2004	Socorro	LINEAR	EUN	1.5 km	MPC · JPL
259820	2004 BJ_{140}	—	January 19, 2004	Kitt Peak	Spacewatch	·	1.6 km	MPC · JPL
259821	2004 BV_{143}	—	January 19, 2004	Kitt Peak	Spacewatch	NYS	1.1 km	MPC · JPL
259822	2004 CN_{2}	—	February 12, 2004	Desert Eagle	W. K. Y. Yeung	·	2.1 km	MPC · JPL
259823	2004 CV_{3}	—	February 10, 2004	Palomar	NEAT	V	920 m	MPC · JPL
259824	2004 CK_{4}	—	February 10, 2004	Palomar	NEAT	·	1.6 km	MPC · JPL
259825	2004 CL_{4}	—	February 10, 2004	Palomar	NEAT	·	1.5 km	MPC · JPL
259826	2004 CJ_{8}	—	February 11, 2004	Kitt Peak	Spacewatch	·	1.3 km	MPC · JPL
259827	2004 CO_{9}	—	February 11, 2004	Kitt Peak	Spacewatch	·	2.0 km	MPC · JPL
259828	2004 CO_{14}	—	February 11, 2004	Kitt Peak	Spacewatch	MAS	820 m	MPC · JPL
259829	2004 CV_{16}	—	February 11, 2004	Kitt Peak	Spacewatch	NYS	920 m	MPC · JPL
259830	2004 CO_{18}	—	February 10, 2004	Palomar	NEAT	·	1.9 km	MPC · JPL
259831	2004 CD_{25}	—	February 12, 2004	Kitt Peak	Spacewatch	MAS	710 m	MPC · JPL
259832	2004 CE_{25}	—	February 12, 2004	Kitt Peak	Spacewatch	GEF	1.7 km	MPC · JPL
259833	2004 CZ_{26}	—	February 11, 2004	Palomar	NEAT	MRX · fast	1.6 km	MPC · JPL
259834	2004 CX_{30}	—	February 12, 2004	Kitt Peak	Spacewatch	CLA	1.8 km	MPC · JPL
259835	2004 CL_{31}	—	February 12, 2004	Kitt Peak	Spacewatch	NYS	1.3 km	MPC · JPL
259836	2004 CA_{33}	—	February 12, 2004	Kitt Peak	Spacewatch	·	1.7 km	MPC · JPL
259837	2004 CX_{39}	—	February 12, 2004	Desert Eagle	W. K. Y. Yeung	·	2.1 km	MPC · JPL
259838	2004 CC_{42}	—	February 10, 2004	Palomar	NEAT	·	940 m	MPC · JPL
259839	2004 CF_{42}	—	February 10, 2004	Palomar	NEAT	·	1.3 km	MPC · JPL
259840	2004 CY_{43}	—	February 12, 2004	Kitt Peak	Spacewatch	MAS	760 m	MPC · JPL
259841	2004 CS_{46}	—	February 13, 2004	Kitt Peak	Spacewatch	·	2.3 km	MPC · JPL
259842	2004 CC_{48}	—	February 14, 2004	Haleakala	NEAT	·	2.0 km	MPC · JPL
259843	2004 CW_{51}	—	February 12, 2004	Palomar	NEAT	H	720 m	MPC · JPL
259844	2004 CT_{52}	—	February 13, 2004	Goodricke-Pigott	Goodricke-Pigott	HNS	1.7 km	MPC · JPL
259845	2004 CN_{56}	—	February 14, 2004	Haleakala	NEAT	·	1.4 km	MPC · JPL
259846	2004 CL_{59}	—	February 10, 2004	Palomar	NEAT	·	1.7 km	MPC · JPL
259847	2004 CC_{61}	—	February 11, 2004	Kitt Peak	Spacewatch	·	1.7 km	MPC · JPL
259848	2004 CA_{70}	—	February 11, 2004	Palomar	NEAT	·	1.7 km	MPC · JPL
259849	2004 CZ_{70}	—	February 12, 2004	Kitt Peak	Spacewatch	NYS	1.2 km	MPC · JPL
259850	2004 CR_{75}	—	February 11, 2004	Palomar	NEAT	·	1.5 km	MPC · JPL
259851	2004 CZ_{79}	—	February 11, 2004	Palomar	NEAT	·	3.8 km	MPC · JPL
259852	2004 CC_{83}	—	February 12, 2004	Kitt Peak	Spacewatch	·	1.1 km	MPC · JPL
259853	2004 CO_{83}	—	February 12, 2004	Kitt Peak	Spacewatch	NYS	1.1 km	MPC · JPL
259854	2004 CA_{86}	—	February 14, 2004	Kitt Peak	Spacewatch	·	1.3 km	MPC · JPL
259855	2004 CF_{86}	—	February 14, 2004	Kitt Peak	Spacewatch	MAS	950 m	MPC · JPL
259856	2004 CL_{86}	—	February 14, 2004	Kitt Peak	Spacewatch	·	2.2 km	MPC · JPL
259857	2004 CP_{86}	—	February 14, 2004	Kitt Peak	Spacewatch	·	2.4 km	MPC · JPL
259858	2004 CQ_{95}	—	February 13, 2004	Kitt Peak	Spacewatch	NYS	1.4 km	MPC · JPL
259859	2004 CV_{96}	—	February 12, 2004	Palomar	NEAT	·	2.0 km	MPC · JPL
259860	2004 CZ_{96}	—	February 13, 2004	Palomar	NEAT	·	2.0 km	MPC · JPL
259861	2004 CM_{98}	—	February 14, 2004	Catalina	CSS	·	2.6 km	MPC · JPL
259862	2004 CG_{103}	—	February 12, 2004	Palomar	NEAT	·	3.3 km	MPC · JPL
259863	2004 CQ_{103}	—	February 12, 2004	Palomar	NEAT	·	2.3 km	MPC · JPL
259864	2004 CJ_{104}	—	February 13, 2004	Palomar	NEAT	V	870 m	MPC · JPL
259865	2004 CR_{105}	—	February 14, 2004	Socorro	LINEAR	·	2.2 km	MPC · JPL
259866	2004 CD_{108}	—	February 14, 2004	Haleakala	NEAT	·	1.5 km	MPC · JPL
259867	2004 CU_{113}	—	February 13, 2004	Anderson Mesa	LONEOS	·	1.5 km	MPC · JPL
259868	2004 CM_{114}	—	February 15, 2004	Socorro	LINEAR	H	1.0 km	MPC · JPL
259869	2004 CC_{117}	—	February 11, 2004	Kitt Peak	Spacewatch	3:2 · SHU	6.7 km	MPC · JPL
259870	2004 CY_{122}	—	February 12, 2004	Kitt Peak	Spacewatch	NYS	1.1 km	MPC · JPL
259871	2004 DP_{1}	—	February 16, 2004	Kitt Peak	Spacewatch	·	1.2 km	MPC · JPL
259872	2004 DD_{5}	—	February 16, 2004	Kitt Peak	Spacewatch	EUN	1.8 km	MPC · JPL
259873	2004 DD_{9}	—	February 17, 2004	Socorro	LINEAR	·	1.1 km	MPC · JPL
259874	2004 DT_{13}	—	February 16, 2004	Kitt Peak	Spacewatch	·	1.3 km	MPC · JPL
259875	2004 DT_{14}	—	February 17, 2004	Palomar	NEAT	·	2.5 km	MPC · JPL
259876	2004 DO_{15}	—	February 17, 2004	Socorro	LINEAR	·	1.1 km	MPC · JPL
259877	2004 DR_{15}	—	February 17, 2004	Catalina	CSS	·	2.2 km	MPC · JPL
259878	2004 DV_{15}	—	February 17, 2004	Socorro	LINEAR	·	4.3 km	MPC · JPL
259879	2004 DW_{20}	—	February 17, 2004	Socorro	LINEAR	·	1.5 km	MPC · JPL
259880	2004 DM_{21}	—	February 17, 2004	Catalina	CSS	ADE	3.5 km	MPC · JPL
259881	2004 DJ_{23}	—	February 18, 2004	Catalina	CSS	·	3.1 km	MPC · JPL
259882	2004 DN_{24}	—	February 19, 2004	Socorro	LINEAR	·	1.3 km	MPC · JPL
259883	2004 DK_{26}	—	February 16, 2004	Kitt Peak	Spacewatch	NYS	1.3 km	MPC · JPL
259884	2004 DA_{28}	—	February 16, 2004	Kitt Peak	Spacewatch	·	2.2 km	MPC · JPL
259885	2004 DV_{29}	—	February 17, 2004	Socorro	LINEAR	·	1.1 km	MPC · JPL
259886	2004 DX_{32}	—	February 18, 2004	Socorro	LINEAR	NYS	1.5 km	MPC · JPL
259887	2004 DH_{34}	—	February 18, 2004	Haleakala	NEAT	·	2.5 km	MPC · JPL
259888	2004 DG_{36}	—	February 19, 2004	Socorro	LINEAR	·	2.6 km	MPC · JPL
259889	2004 DD_{40}	—	February 17, 2004	Kitt Peak	Spacewatch	·	1.2 km	MPC · JPL
259890	2004 DZ_{41}	—	February 19, 2004	Socorro	LINEAR	(5)	2.1 km	MPC · JPL
259891	2004 DJ_{47}	—	February 19, 2004	Socorro	LINEAR	MAS	930 m	MPC · JPL
259892	2004 DX_{47}	—	February 19, 2004	Socorro	LINEAR	·	2.6 km	MPC · JPL
259893	2004 DJ_{52}	—	February 25, 2004	Socorro	LINEAR	·	1.2 km	MPC · JPL
259894	2004 DV_{52}	—	February 25, 2004	Socorro	LINEAR	·	2.1 km	MPC · JPL
259895	2004 DT_{56}	—	February 22, 2004	Kitt Peak	Spacewatch	·	1.6 km	MPC · JPL
259896	2004 DN_{58}	—	February 23, 2004	Socorro	LINEAR	·	2.7 km	MPC · JPL
259897	2004 DR_{58}	—	February 23, 2004	Socorro	LINEAR	HIL · 3:2	7.5 km	MPC · JPL
259898	2004 DE_{66}	—	February 23, 2004	Socorro	LINEAR	MAS	970 m	MPC · JPL
259899	2004 DC_{74}	—	February 17, 2004	Kitt Peak	Spacewatch	·	1.3 km	MPC · JPL
259900	2004 DJ_{76}	—	February 17, 2004	Kitt Peak	Spacewatch	MAS	750 m	MPC · JPL

== 259901–260000 ==
back to top

Designation			Discovery			Properties		Ref
Permanent	Provisional	Named after	Date	Site	Discoverer(s)	Category	Diam.	Ref
259901	2004 EL	—	March 11, 2004	Emerald Lane	L. Ball	·	1.6 km	MPC · JPL
259902	2004 EH_{2}	—	March 12, 2004	Palomar	NEAT	·	4.0 km	MPC · JPL
259903	2004 ES_{3}	—	March 10, 2004	Palomar	NEAT	·	2.0 km	MPC · JPL
259904	2004 EL_{7}	—	March 12, 2004	Palomar	NEAT	·	1.0 km	MPC · JPL
259905 Vougeot	2004 EO_{9}	Vougeot	March 14, 2004	Vicques	M. Ory	NYS	1.3 km	MPC · JPL
259906	2004 EG_{10}	—	March 14, 2004	Catalina	CSS	·	1.5 km	MPC · JPL
259907	2004 EH_{12}	—	March 11, 2004	Palomar	NEAT	·	1.9 km	MPC · JPL
259908	2004 EW_{13}	—	March 11, 2004	Palomar	NEAT	(6769)	1.4 km	MPC · JPL
259909	2004 ES_{16}	—	March 12, 2004	Palomar	NEAT	·	3.5 km	MPC · JPL
259910	2004 ET_{16}	—	March 12, 2004	Palomar	NEAT	·	1.4 km	MPC · JPL
259911	2004 EF_{17}	—	March 12, 2004	Palomar	NEAT	HNS	1.6 km	MPC · JPL
259912	2004 EV_{17}	—	March 12, 2004	Palomar	NEAT	H	650 m	MPC · JPL
259913	2004 EG_{19}	—	March 14, 2004	Kitt Peak	Spacewatch	NYS	1.1 km	MPC · JPL
259914	2004 EW_{22}	—	March 15, 2004	Kitt Peak	Spacewatch	·	2.1 km	MPC · JPL
259915	2004 EP_{23}	—	March 15, 2004	Socorro	LINEAR	H	510 m	MPC · JPL
259916	2004 ES_{23}	—	March 15, 2004	Socorro	LINEAR	H	520 m	MPC · JPL
259917	2004 EJ_{24}	—	March 15, 2004	Črni Vrh	Matičič, S.	·	1.8 km	MPC · JPL
259918	2004 EO_{24}	—	March 14, 2004	Socorro	LINEAR	·	4.3 km	MPC · JPL
259919	2004 EG_{25}	—	March 10, 2004	Palomar	NEAT	·	1.6 km	MPC · JPL
259920	2004 EZ_{25}	—	March 13, 2004	Palomar	NEAT	MAS	910 m	MPC · JPL
259921	2004 EW_{29}	—	March 15, 2004	Kitt Peak	Spacewatch	·	1.9 km	MPC · JPL
259922	2004 EV_{32}	—	March 15, 2004	Palomar	NEAT	·	1.8 km	MPC · JPL
259923	2004 EB_{33}	—	March 15, 2004	Palomar	NEAT	EUN	1.7 km	MPC · JPL
259924	2004 EE_{33}	—	March 15, 2004	Palomar	NEAT	·	2.1 km	MPC · JPL
259925	2004 EV_{34}	—	March 12, 2004	Palomar	NEAT	·	1.6 km	MPC · JPL
259926	2004 EK_{35}	—	March 12, 2004	Palomar	NEAT	·	1.6 km	MPC · JPL
259927	2004 EL_{36}	—	March 13, 2004	Palomar	NEAT	NYS	1.4 km	MPC · JPL
259928	2004 EM_{38}	—	March 14, 2004	Kitt Peak	Spacewatch	EUN	1.4 km	MPC · JPL
259929	2004 EY_{38}	—	March 14, 2004	Catalina	CSS	·	2.1 km	MPC · JPL
259930	2004 EE_{39}	—	March 15, 2004	Kitt Peak	Spacewatch	·	2.2 km	MPC · JPL
259931	2004 EH_{41}	—	March 15, 2004	Socorro	LINEAR	PHO	1.2 km	MPC · JPL
259932	2004 EN_{41}	—	March 15, 2004	Catalina	CSS	·	1.9 km	MPC · JPL
259933	2004 ES_{41}	—	March 15, 2004	Catalina	CSS	NYS	1.1 km	MPC · JPL
259934	2004 EQ_{44}	—	March 15, 2004	Kitt Peak	Spacewatch	·	1.3 km	MPC · JPL
259935	2004 EB_{45}	—	March 15, 2004	Kitt Peak	Spacewatch	3:2	6.0 km	MPC · JPL
259936	2004 ES_{48}	—	March 15, 2004	Catalina	CSS	·	1.5 km	MPC · JPL
259937	2004 EW_{49}	—	March 15, 2004	Kitt Peak	Spacewatch	·	2.5 km	MPC · JPL
259938	2004 EG_{50}	—	March 12, 2004	Palomar	NEAT	HOF	4.0 km	MPC · JPL
259939	2004 EP_{50}	—	March 14, 2004	Kitt Peak	Spacewatch	MAS	900 m	MPC · JPL
259940	2004 EJ_{53}	—	March 15, 2004	Socorro	LINEAR	·	3.7 km	MPC · JPL
259941	2004 EQ_{55}	—	March 14, 2004	Palomar	NEAT	HNS	1.7 km	MPC · JPL
259942	2004 ER_{55}	—	March 14, 2004	Socorro	LINEAR	·	2.8 km	MPC · JPL
259943	2004 ET_{55}	—	March 14, 2004	Palomar	NEAT	EUN	1.9 km	MPC · JPL
259944	2004 EC_{60}	—	March 15, 2004	Palomar	NEAT	·	2.5 km	MPC · JPL
259945	2004 EC_{61}	—	March 12, 2004	Palomar	NEAT	·	1.6 km	MPC · JPL
259946	2004 ER_{62}	—	March 13, 2004	Palomar	NEAT	·	1.6 km	MPC · JPL
259947	2004 EG_{64}	—	March 14, 2004	Catalina	CSS	·	1.6 km	MPC · JPL
259948	2004 EC_{67}	—	March 15, 2004	Kitt Peak	Spacewatch	NYS	1.3 km	MPC · JPL
259949	2004 EO_{68}	—	March 15, 2004	Socorro	LINEAR	·	1.6 km	MPC · JPL
259950	2004 EC_{70}	—	March 15, 2004	Kitt Peak	Spacewatch	NYS	1.1 km	MPC · JPL
259951	2004 EK_{71}	—	March 15, 2004	Catalina	CSS	·	1.4 km	MPC · JPL
259952	2004 EU_{73}	—	March 15, 2004	Kitt Peak	Spacewatch	·	1.2 km	MPC · JPL
259953	2004 EB_{74}	—	March 12, 2004	Palomar	NEAT	·	1.7 km	MPC · JPL
259954	2004 EE_{74}	—	March 12, 2004	Palomar	NEAT	·	3.1 km	MPC · JPL
259955	2004 EH_{75}	—	March 14, 2004	Kitt Peak	Spacewatch	·	1.5 km	MPC · JPL
259956	2004 EN_{75}	—	March 14, 2004	Kitt Peak	Spacewatch	HNS	1.7 km	MPC · JPL
259957	2004 ES_{82}	—	March 13, 2004	Palomar	NEAT	EUN	1.3 km	MPC · JPL
259958	2004 ER_{84}	—	March 15, 2004	Socorro	LINEAR	·	2.1 km	MPC · JPL
259959	2004 EQ_{91}	—	March 15, 2004	Kitt Peak	Spacewatch	·	1.7 km	MPC · JPL
259960	2004 EW_{94}	—	March 15, 2004	Socorro	LINEAR	·	2.5 km	MPC · JPL
259961	2004 EF_{95}	—	March 15, 2004	Kitt Peak	Spacewatch	·	1.4 km	MPC · JPL
259962	2004 EB_{103}	—	March 15, 2004	Kitt Peak	Spacewatch	·	1.3 km	MPC · JPL
259963	2004 FX	—	March 16, 2004	Goodricke-Pigott	Goodricke-Pigott	·	1.3 km	MPC · JPL
259964	2004 FG_{14}	—	March 16, 2004	Kitt Peak	Spacewatch	·	3.0 km	MPC · JPL
259965	2004 FS_{15}	—	March 19, 2004	Siding Spring	Siding Spring	H	740 m	MPC · JPL
259966	2004 FV_{20}	—	March 16, 2004	Socorro	LINEAR	·	2.2 km	MPC · JPL
259967	2004 FE_{24}	—	March 17, 2004	Kitt Peak	Spacewatch	·	2.4 km	MPC · JPL
259968	2004 FO_{28}	—	March 18, 2004	Socorro	LINEAR	·	1.6 km	MPC · JPL
259969	2004 FQ_{28}	—	March 18, 2004	Kitt Peak	Spacewatch	·	2.6 km	MPC · JPL
259970	2004 FT_{28}	—	March 26, 2004	Socorro	LINEAR	H	780 m	MPC · JPL
259971	2004 FB_{30}	—	March 17, 2004	Palomar	NEAT	H	740 m	MPC · JPL
259972	2004 FC_{30}	—	March 18, 2004	Palomar	NEAT	H	890 m	MPC · JPL
259973	2004 FO_{30}	—	March 29, 2004	Socorro	LINEAR	·	2.3 km	MPC · JPL
259974	2004 FU_{31}	—	March 30, 2004	Socorro	LINEAR	PHO	1.4 km	MPC · JPL
259975	2004 FK_{33}	—	March 16, 2004	Socorro	LINEAR	·	1.9 km	MPC · JPL
259976	2004 FN_{33}	—	March 16, 2004	Catalina	CSS	·	1.9 km	MPC · JPL
259977	2004 FH_{34}	—	March 16, 2004	Catalina	CSS	JUN	1.9 km	MPC · JPL
259978	2004 FF_{35}	—	March 16, 2004	Kitt Peak	Spacewatch	·	2.2 km	MPC · JPL
259979	2004 FA_{38}	—	March 17, 2004	Kitt Peak	Spacewatch	·	1.8 km	MPC · JPL
259980	2004 FB_{41}	—	March 18, 2004	Kitt Peak	Spacewatch	·	3.6 km	MPC · JPL
259981	2004 FM_{42}	—	March 18, 2004	Kitt Peak	Spacewatch	·	1.2 km	MPC · JPL
259982	2004 FP_{47}	—	March 18, 2004	Socorro	LINEAR	·	2.4 km	MPC · JPL
259983	2004 FO_{49}	—	March 18, 2004	Socorro	LINEAR	·	1.3 km	MPC · JPL
259984	2004 FZ_{61}	—	March 19, 2004	Socorro	LINEAR	·	1.3 km	MPC · JPL
259985	2004 FA_{64}	—	March 19, 2004	Socorro	LINEAR	HNS	1.7 km	MPC · JPL
259986	2004 FO_{64}	—	March 19, 2004	Socorro	LINEAR	NYS	1.6 km	MPC · JPL
259987	2004 FY_{65}	—	March 19, 2004	Socorro	LINEAR	MAS	970 m	MPC · JPL
259988	2004 FY_{67}	—	March 20, 2004	Socorro	LINEAR	·	4.7 km	MPC · JPL
259989	2004 FG_{68}	—	March 20, 2004	Socorro	LINEAR	·	1.9 km	MPC · JPL
259990	2004 FX_{69}	—	March 16, 2004	Kitt Peak	Spacewatch	·	1.5 km	MPC · JPL
259991	2004 FO_{71}	—	March 17, 2004	Kitt Peak	Spacewatch	·	1.7 km	MPC · JPL
259992	2004 FL_{82}	—	March 17, 2004	Kitt Peak	Spacewatch	·	1.5 km	MPC · JPL
259993	2004 FP_{82}	—	March 17, 2004	Kitt Peak	Spacewatch	·	2.6 km	MPC · JPL
259994	2004 FA_{83}	—	March 17, 2004	Socorro	LINEAR	·	2.9 km	MPC · JPL
259995	2004 FM_{95}	—	March 22, 2004	Socorro	LINEAR	·	1.5 km	MPC · JPL
259996	2004 FT_{96}	—	March 23, 2004	Socorro	LINEAR	EUN	1.8 km	MPC · JPL
259997	2004 FX_{108}	—	March 23, 2004	Kitt Peak	Spacewatch	·	1.7 km	MPC · JPL
259998	2004 FM_{109}	—	March 24, 2004	Anderson Mesa	LONEOS	·	1.8 km	MPC · JPL
259999	2004 FO_{109}	—	March 24, 2004	Anderson Mesa	LONEOS	HNS	1.5 km	MPC · JPL
260000	2004 FB_{112}	—	March 26, 2004	Kitt Peak	Spacewatch	·	1.7 km	MPC · JPL

back to top

== See also ==
- Meanings of minor-planet names: 259001–260000
