= Jana Tichá =

Czech astronomer

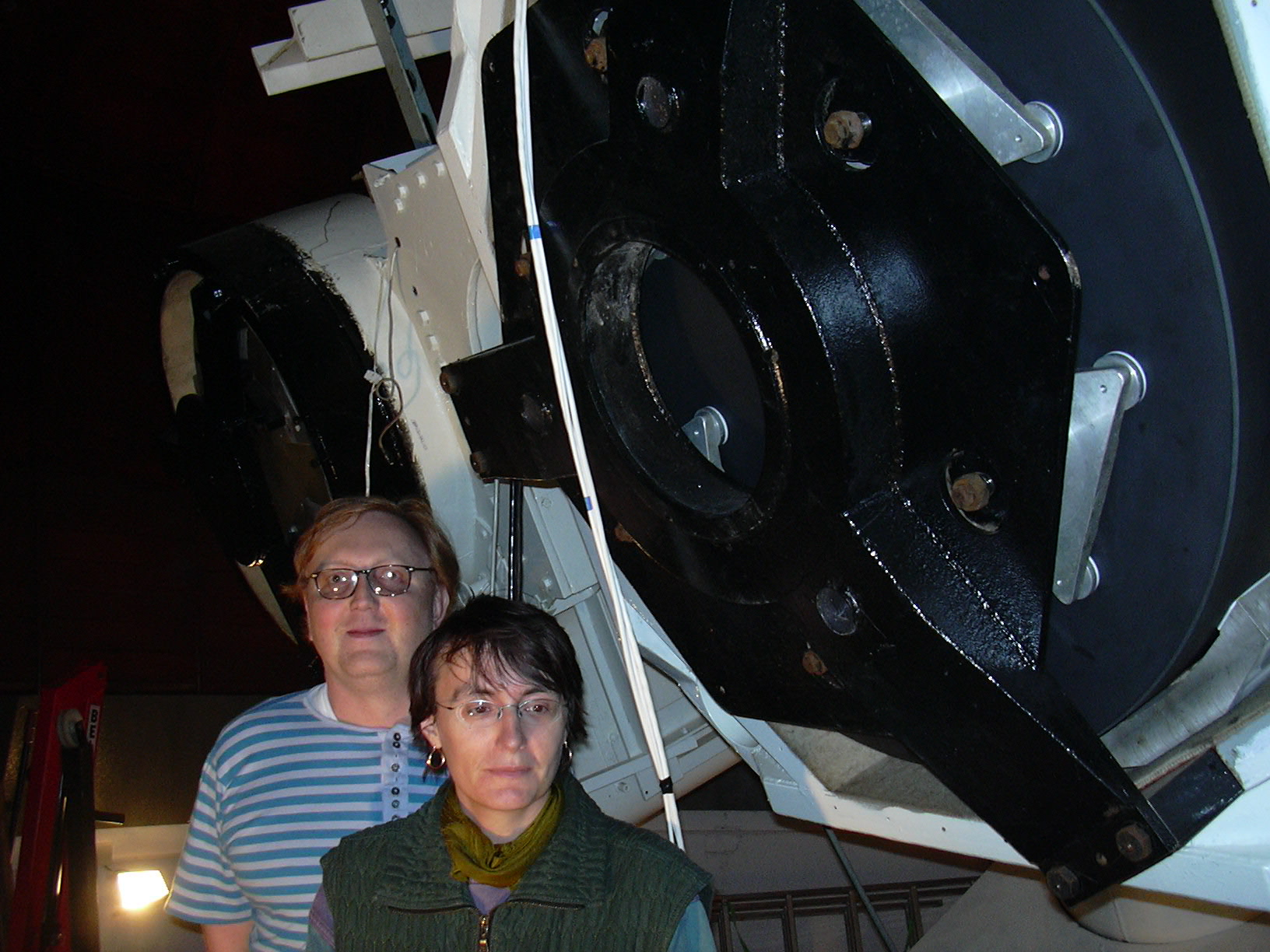
Jana Tichá with her ex-husband Miloš Tichý

Minor planets discovered: 110
see § List of discovered minor planets

Jana Tichá (born 1965 in České Budějovice) is a Czech astronomer and discoverer of minor planets. She studied at the University of Economics in Prague and graduated in 1987. In 1992 she was selected for the position of a director of the Kleť Observatory.

She specializes in discoveries of asteroids and comets especially near-Earth objects (NEOs). The Minor Planet Center credits her with the discovery of 104 numbered minor planets during 1995–2003. She is the chair of the IAU Committee on Small Body Nomenclature (CSBN), which is responsible for approving names of asteroids. She works together with her ex-husband Miloš Tichý at Kleť.

In her country she is also well known for her popularization activities. She is major contributor to the Czech web servers about asteroids and comets.

On 3 May 1996 the asteroid 5757 Tichá was named in her honour (M.P.C. 27128), while she named her discovery, the main-belt asteroid 8307 Peltan, after several members of her family.

== List of discovered minor planets ==
7441 Láska	30 July 1995	list^{[A]}
7493 Hirzo	24 October 1995	list
7608 Telegramia	22 October 1995	list
8307 Peltan	5 March 1995	list
8572 Nijo	19 October 1996	list^{[A]}
10234 Sixtygarden	27 December 1997	list^{[A]}
10403 Marcelgrün	22 November 1997	list^{[A]}
10872 Vaculík	12 October 1996	list^{[A]}
11105 Puchnarová	24 October 1995	list
11128 Ostravia	3 November 1996	list^{[A]}
11141 Jindrawalter	12 January 1997	list^{[A]}
11144 Radiocommunicata	2 February 1997	list^{[A]}
11338 Schiele	13 October 1996	list^{[A]}
12010 Kovářov	18 October 1996	list^{[A]}
12833 Kamenný Újezd	2 February 1997	list^{[A]}
13229 Echion	2 November 1997	list^{[A]}
13792 Kuščynskyj	7 November 1998	list^{[A]}
14068 Hauserová	21 April 1996	list^{[A]}
14541 Sacrobosco	20 September 1997	list^{[A]}
14948 Bartuška	16 January 1996	list^{[A]}

15399 Hudec	2 November 1997	list^{[A]}
16083 Jorvik	12 October 1999	list^{[A]}
16709 Auratian	29 September 1995	list
16742 Zink	21 July 1996	list^{[A]}
16794 Cucullia	2 February 1997	list^{[A]}
17167 Olgarozanova	4 July 1999	list^{[A]}
18456 Mišík	8 March 1995	list^{[A]}
18841 Hruška	6 September 1999	list^{[A]}
19384 Winton	6 February 1998	list^{[A]}
20164 Janzajíc	9 November 1996	list^{[A]}
21873 Jindřichůvhradec	29 October 1999	list^{[A]}
21270 Otokar	19 July 1996	list^{[A]}
22442 Blaha	14 October 1996	list^{[A]}
22450 Nové Hrady	3 November 1996	list^{[A]}
25258 Nathaniel	7 November 1998	list^{[A]}
26314 Škvorecký	16 October 1998	list^{[A]}
26340 Evamarková	13 December 1998	list^{[A]}
26969 Biver	20 September 1997	list^{[A]}
27087 Tillmannmohr	24 October 1998	list^{[A]}
28220 York	28 December 1998	list^{[A]}

29477 Zdíkšíma	31 October 1997	list^{[A]}
29738 Ivobudil	23 January 1999	list^{[A]}
31232 Slavonice	1 February 1998	list^{[A]}
31238 Kroměříž	21 February 1998	list^{[A]}
33061 Václavmorava	2 November 1997	list^{[A]}
35233 Krčín	26 May 1995	list^{[A]}
35269 Idefix	21 August 1996	list^{[A]}
35446 Stáňa	6 February 1998	list^{[A]}
35977 Lexington	3 July 1999	list^{[A]}
35978 Arlington	5 July 1999	list^{[A]}
36035 Petrvok	6 August 1999	list^{[A]}
37699 Santini-Aichl	13 January 1996	list^{[A]}
37736 Jandl	15 November 1996	list^{[A]}
(38246) 1999 PL_{4}	14 August 1999	list^{[A]}
40206 Lhenice	26 September 1998	list^{[A]}
44530 Horáková	25 December 1998	list^{[A]}
44597 Thoreau	6 August 1999	list^{[A]}
46692 Taormina	2 February 1997	list^{[A]}
47144 Faulkes	7 August 1999	list^{[A]}
47294 Blanský les	28 November 1999	list^{[A]}

48794 Stolzová	5 October 1997	list^{[A]}
49698 Váchal	1 November 1999	list^{[A]}
50413 Petrginz	27 February 2000	list^{[A]}
52665 Brianmay	30 January 1998	list^{[A]}
53093 La Orotava	28 December 1998	list^{[A]}
55082 Xlendi	25 August 2001	list^{[A]}
56329 Tarxien	28 November 1999	list^{[A]}
56422 Mnajdra	2 April 2000	list^{[A]}
58607 Wenzel	19 October 1997	list^{[A]}
58664 IYAMMIX	21 December 1997	list^{[A]}
58682 Alenašolcová	10 January 1998	list^{[A]}
59001 Senftenberg	26 September 1998	list^{[A]}
59797 Píšala	7 August 1999	list^{[A]}
59830 Reynek	10 September 1999	list^{[A]}
61208 Stonařov	30 July 2000	list^{[A]}
66934 Kálalová	26 November 1999	list^{[A]}
69469 Krumbenowe	16 November 1996	list^{[A]}
70679 Urzidil	30 October 1999	list^{[A]}
70936 Kámen	28 November 1999	list^{[A]}
74024 Hrabě	23 April 1998	list^{[A]}

74370 Kolářjan	9 December 1998	list^{[A]}
75223 Wupatki	28 November 1999	list^{[A]}
76628 Kozí Hrádek	22 April 2000	list^{[A]}
79347 Medlov	4 December 1996	list^{[A]}
79354 Brundibár	16 January 1997	list^{[A]}
85389 Rosenauer	22 August 1996	list^{[A]}
85516 Vaclík	2 November 1997	list^{[A]}
(85573) 1998 CE	1 February 1998	list^{[A]}
(85574) 1998 CG	1 February 1998	list^{[A]}
87097 Lomaki	7 June 2000	list^{[A]}
91007 Ianfleming	30 January 1998	list^{[A]}
100735 Alpomořanská	19 February 1998	list^{[A]}
101721 Emanuelfritsch	13 March 1999	list^{[A]}
118214 Agnesediboemia	12 January 1996	list^{[A]}
129595 Vand	2 November 1997	list^{[A]}
133077 Jirsík	4 May 2003	list^{[A]}
136666 Seidel	17 September 1995	list^{[A]}
152750 Brloh	21 January 1999	list^{[A]}
171588 Náprstek	26 November 1999	list^{[A]}
192439 Cílek	1 November 1997	list^{[A]}

(196298) 2003 FQ	22 March 2003	list^{[A]}
(215606) 2003 SF_{36}	17 September 2003	list^{[A]}
(223225) 2003 DW_{7}	25 February 2003	list^{[A]}
(230667) 2003 SZ_{200}	25 September 2003	list^{[A]}
(259308) 2003 FY_{1}	23 March 2003	list^{[A]}
(259309) 2003 FB_{2}	23 March 2003	list^{[A]}
(259384) 2003 JX_{10}	4 May 2003	list^{[A]}
(259481) 2003 SY_{200}	25 September 2003	list^{[A]}
(298349) 2003 JW_{10}	4 May 2003	list^{[A]}
(307562) 2003 FX_{1}	23 March 2003	list^{[A]}
(382764) 2003 QP_{10}	22 August 2003	list^{[A]}
(393568) 2003 JY_{10}	4 May 2003	list^{[A]}
(474470) 2003 SA_{201}	25 September 2003	list^{[A]}
Co-discovery made with:^{A} M. Tichý
