= 21873 Jindřichůvhradec =

Main-belt asteroid

Discovery
- Discovered by: J. Tichá; M. Tichý
- Discovery site: Kleť Obs.
- Discovery date: 29 October 1999

Designations
- Named after: Jindřichův Hradec (Czech town)
- Alternative designations: 1999 UU_{3} · 1982 SN_{8} 1988 XA_{5}
- Minor planet category: main-belt · (outer); Hygiea

Orbital characteristics
- Epoch 4 September 2017 (JD 2458000.5)
- Uncertainty parameter 0
- Observation arc: 34.52 yr (12,608 days)
- Aphelion: 3.8041 AU
- Perihelion: 2.4999 AU
- Semi-major axis: 3.1520 AU
- Eccentricity: 0.2069
- Orbital period (sidereal): 5.60 yr (2,044 days)
- Mean anomaly: 89.398°
- Mean motion: 0° 10^{m} 33.96^{s} / day
- Inclination: 4.4633°
- Longitude of ascending node: 238.03°
- Argument of perihelion: 130.91°

Physical characteristics
- Dimensions: 7.183±0.136 km 10.44 km (calculated)
- Synodic rotation period: 50.5874±0.0664 h
- Geometric albedo: 0.057 (assumed); 0.237±0.088
- Spectral type: C (assumed) · X
- Absolute magnitude (H): 12.9 · 12.90±0.17 · 13.1 · 13.184±0.005 (R) · 13.63

21873 Jindřichůvhradec (provisional designation 1999 UU_{3}) is a dark Hygiean asteroid and relatively slower-than average rotator from the outer region of the asteroid belt, approximately 8 kilometers (5.0 miles) in diameter.

It was discovered by Czech astronomers Jana Tichá and Miloš Tichý at the South Bohemian Kleť Observatory on 29 October 1999, and named for the Czech town of Jindřichův Hradec.

== Orbit ==
The asteroid is a member of the Hygiea family (601), a very large family of carbonaceous outer-belt asteroids, named after the fourth-largest asteroid, 10 Hygiea. It orbits the Sun in the outer main-belt at a distance of 2.5–3.8 AU once every 5 years and 7 months (2,044 days). Its orbit has an eccentricity of 0.21 and an inclination of 4° with respect to the ecliptic. The first precovery was obtained at Crimea–Nauchnij in 1982, extending the asteroid's observation arc by 17 years prior to its discovery.

== Physical characteristics ==
According to the survey carried out by the NEOWISE mission of NASA's space-based Wide-field Infrared Survey Explorer, the asteroid measures 7.2 kilometers in diameter and its surface has an albedo of 0.23. Based on an absolute magnitude of 13.63, the Collaborative Asteroid Lightcurve Link calculates a diameter of 10.4 kilometers, assuming a standard albedo for carbonaceous C-type asteroids of 0.057, which is in-line with the Hygiea family's overall spectral type. A large-scale survey by Pan-STARRS, however, classifies the body as an X-type asteroid, which metallic core group has an intermediate albedo between stony and carbonaceous bodies.

In September 2010, a photometric lightcurve analysis at the U.S. Palomar Transient Factory, California, gave a long rotation period of 50.5874±0.0664 hours with a brightness variation of 0.61 in magnitude (U=2). This makes it a relatively slow rotator for an asteroid of its size, which normally have periods of just a few hours rather than several days.

== Naming ==
This minor planet was named after Jindřichův Hradec, a south Bohemian town in the Czech Republic. Founded in the 13th century, it is known for its Renaissance château and Gothic church, which is exactly built on the 15th meridian east of Greenwich. A line marks the course of the meridian in its paving stones. The approved naming citation was published by the Minor Planet Center on 28 January 2002 (M.P.C. 44595).
