= Peter Mansfield =

English physicist (1933–2017)

Sir Peter Mansfield FRS
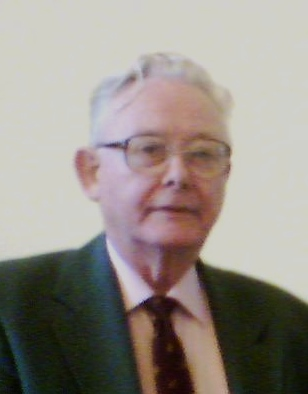
- Mansfield in 2006
- Born: 9 October 1933; Lambeth, London, England
- Died: 8 February 2017 (aged 83); Nottingham, England
- Education: Queen Mary College, University of London
- Known for: Magnetic Resonance Imaging
- Spouse: Jean Margaret Kibble (m. 1962)
- Children: 2
- Parent(s): Sidney George Mansfield; Lillian Rose Turner
- Awards: FRS (1987); Knight Bachelor (1993); Nobel Prize in Physiology or Medicine (2003)
- Scientific career
- Workplaces: University of Illinois at Urbana–Champaign; University of Nottingham
- Thesis: Proton magnetic resonance relaxation in solids by transient methods (1962)
- Doctoral advisor: Jack Powles
- Website: The Nobelprize – Sir Peter Mansfield Biographical

Sir Peter Mansfield FRS (9 October 1933 – 8 February 2017) was an English physicist who was awarded the 2003 Nobel Prize in Physiology or Medicine, shared with Paul Lauterbur, for discoveries concerning Magnetic Resonance Imaging (MRI). Mansfield was a professor at the University of Nottingham.

== Early life ==
Mansfield was born in Lambeth, London on 9 October 1933, to Sidney George (b. 1904, d. 1966) and Lillian Rose Mansfield (b. 1905, d. 1984; née Turner). Mansfield was the youngest of three sons.

Mansfield grew up in Camberwell. During World War II he was evacuated from London, initially to Sevenoaks and then twice to Torquay, Devon, where he was able to stay with the same family on both occasions. On returning to London after the war he was told by a school master to take the 11+ exam. Having never heard of the exam before, and having no time to prepare, Mansfield failed to gain a place at the local Grammar school. His mark was, however, high enough for him to go to a Central School in Peckham. At the age of 15, he was told by a careers teacher that science was not for him. He left school shortly afterwards to work as a printer's assistant.

At the age of 18, having developed an interest in rocketry, Mansfield took up a job with the Rocket Propulsion Department of the Ministry of Supply in Westcott, Buckinghamshire. Eighteen months later he was called up for National Service.

== Education ==
After serving in the army for two years, Mansfield returned to Westcott and started studying for A-levels at night school. Two years later he was admitted to study physics at Queen Mary College, University of London.

Mansfield graduated with a BSc from Queen Mary in 1959. His final-year project, supervised by Jack Powles, was to construct a portable, transistor-based spectrometer to measure the Earth's magnetic field. Towards the end of this project Powles offered Mansfield a position in his NMR (Nuclear Magnetic Resonance) research group. Powles' interest was in studying molecular motion, mainly liquids. Mansfield's project was to build a pulsed NMR spectrometer to study solid polymer systems. He received his PhD in 1962; his thesis was titled Proton magnetic resonance relaxation in solids by transient methods.

== Career ==
Following his PhD, Mansfield was invited to postdoctoral research with Charlie Slichter at the University of Illinois at Urbana–Champaign, where he carried out an NMR study of doped metals.

In 1964, Mansfield returned to England to take up a place as a lecturer at Nottingham University where he could continue his studies in multiple-pulse NMR. He was successively appointed Senior Lecturer in 1968 and Reader in 1970. During this period his team developed the MRI equipment with the help of grants from the Medical Research Council. It was not until the 1970s with Paul Lauterbur's and Mansfield's developments that NMR could be used to produce images of the body. In 1979 Mansfield was appointed Professor of the Department of Physics until his retirement in 1994.

- 1962: Research Associate, Department of Physics, University of Illinois
- 1964: Lecturer, Department of Physics, University of Nottingham
- 1968: Senior Lecturer, Department of Physics, University of Nottingham
- 1970: Reader, Department of Physics, University of Nottingham
- 1972–73: Senior Visitor, Max Planck Institute for Medical Research, Heidelberg
- 1979: Professor, Department of Physics, University of Nottingham

Mansfield is credited with inventing 'slice selection' for MRI, i.e. the method by which a localised axial slice of a subject can be selectively imaged, rather than the entire subject – and understanding how the radio signals from MRI can be mathematically analysed, making interpretation of the signals into a useful image a possibility. He is also credited with discovering how fast imaging could be possible by developing the MRI protocol called echo-planar imaging. Echo-planar imaging allows T2* weighted images to be collected many times faster than previously possible. It also has made functional magnetic resonance imaging (fMRI) feasible.

Whilst working at Nottingham University, Mansfield tested the first full body prototype, installed just before Christmas, 1978. Mansfield was so keen, that he volunteered to test it himself and produced the first scan of a live patient. The prototype machine is now an exhibit, in the Medical Section of the Science Museum.

== Awards and honours ==
- 1983 Gold Medal of the Society of Magnetic Resonance in Medicine
- 1984 Joint award of the Royal Society Welcome Foundation Gold Medal and Prize.
- 1986 Elected Fellow of Queen Mary College (now Queen Mary University of London)
- 1987 Elected Fellow of the Royal Society (FRS)
- 1987 Elected President of the Society of Magnetic Resonance in Medicine
- 1988 Awarded Duddell Medal and Prize by the Institute of Physics
- 1988 Awarded Silvanus Thompson Medal by the British Institute of Radiology
- 1989 Antoine Béclère Medal from the International Society of Radiology and the Antoine Béclère Institute in Paris
- 1990 Royal Society Mullard Award (joint with John Mallard & Jim Hutchinson)
- 1992 International Society of Magnetic Resonance (ISMAR) prize (joint with P. Lauterbur)
- 1993 Knighted
- 1993 Silver Plaque of the European Society of Magnetic Resonance in Medicine and Biology
- 1993 Elected Honorary Fellow of the Royal College of Radiology and Honorary Member of the British Institute of Radiology
- 1994 Elected Honorary Member of the Society of Magnetic Resonance Imaging and Fellow of the Society of Magnetic Resonance
- 1995 Garmisch-Partenkirchen Prize for MRI
- 1995 Gold Medal of the European Congress of Radiology and the European Association of Radiology
- 1997 Honorary Fellow of the Institute of Physics
- 2003 Nobel Prize in Physiology or Medicine for Medicine with Paul Lauterbur
- 2009 was presented with the Lifetime Achievement Award by the Prime Minister, Gordon Brown, ceremony broadcast on ITV's Pride of Britain Awards
- 2016 Asteroid 262972 Petermansfield, discovered by astronomer Vincenzo Silvano Casulli in 2007, was named in his honour. The official naming citation was published by the Minor Planet Center on 22 April 2016 (M.P.C. 99893).

== Private life ==
Mansfield married Jean Margaret Kibble (b. 1935) on 1 September 1962. He had two daughters.

Mansfield died in Nottingham on 8 February 2017, aged 83.
