= Meanings of minor-planet names: 262001–263000 =

As minor planet discoveries are confirmed, they are given a permanent number by the IAU's Minor Planet Center (MPC), and the discoverers can then submit names for them, following the IAU's naming conventions. The list below concerns those minor planets in the specified number-range that have received names, and explains the meanings of those names.

Official naming citations of newly named small Solar System bodies are approved and published in a bulletin by IAU's Working Group for Small Bodies Nomenclature (WGSBN). Before May 2021, citations were published in MPC's Minor Planet Circulars for many decades. Recent citations can also be found on the JPL Small-Body Database (SBDB). Until his death in 2016, German astronomer Lutz D. Schmadel compiled these citations into the Dictionary of Minor Planet Names (DMP) and regularly updated the collection.

Based on Paul Herget's The Names of the Minor Planets, Schmadel also researched the unclear origin of numerous asteroids, most of which had been named prior to World War II. This article incorporates text from this source, which is in the public domain: SBDB New namings may only be added to this list below after official publication as the preannouncement of names is condemned. The WGSBN publishes a comprehensive guideline for the naming rules of non-cometary small Solar System bodies.

== 262001–262100 ==
Named minor planet	Provisional	This minor planet was named for...	Ref · Catalog
There are no named minor planets in this number range

== 262101–262200 ==
back to top

Named minor planet	Provisional	This minor planet was named for...	Ref · Catalog
262106 Margaretryan	2006 RU_{108}	Margaret Ryan Masiero (born 1956), the mother of the American discoverer Joseph Masiero	JPL · 262106

== 262201–262300 ==
back to top

Named minor planet	Provisional	This minor planet was named for...	Ref · Catalog
262284 Kanišauskas	2006 SA_{369}	Saulius Kanišauskas, Lithuanian philosopher, science popularizer, and former astronomy educator.	IAU · 262284
262295 Jeffrich	2006 SY_{395}	Jeffrey Rich Jr (born 1983), an American astronomer	JPL · 262295

== 262301–262400 ==
back to top

Named minor planet	Provisional	This minor planet was named for...	Ref · Catalog
There are no named minor planets in this number range

== 262401–262500 ==
back to top

Named minor planet	Provisional	This minor planet was named for...	Ref · Catalog
262418 Samofalov	2006 UV_{61}	Viacheslav Samofalov (born 1963), a composer and a soloist of the Ukrainian National Philharmonic	JPL · 262418
262419 Suzaka	2006 UK_{63}	Suzaka, a city of about 50 000 inhabitants located in northern Nagano prefecture.	JPL · 262419

== 262501–262600 ==
back to top

Named minor planet	Provisional	This minor planet was named for...	Ref · Catalog
262536 Nowikow	2006 UJ_{349}	Igor Nowikow, a physics teacher at Markham District High School in Markham, Canada	JPL · 262536

== 262601–262700 ==
back to top

Named minor planet	Provisional	This minor planet was named for...	Ref · Catalog
There are no named minor planets in this number range

== 262701–262800 ==
back to top

Named minor planet	Provisional	This minor planet was named for...	Ref · Catalog
262705 Vosne-Romanée	2006 XH_{4}	Vosne-Romanée, a Burgundy village situated between Beaune and Dijon, France. The village has six Grand Cru vineyards, the most famous of which is Romanée-Conti.	JPL · 262705

== 262801–262900 ==
back to top

Named minor planet	Provisional	This minor planet was named for...	Ref · Catalog
262825 Dianearbus	2007 AD_{23}	Diane Arbus, American photographer.	IAU · 262825
262876 Davidlynch	2007 BL_{73}	David Lynch (born 1946), an American director, screenwriter, producer, painter, musician, photographer and occasional actor	JPL · 262876

== 262901–263000 ==
back to top

Named minor planet	Provisional	This minor planet was named for...	Ref · Catalog
262972 Petermansfield	2007 ER_{9}	Peter Mansfield (1933–2017), an English physicist and Nobel laureate	JPL · 262972

back to top

Preceded by 261,001–262,000	Meanings of minor-planet names List of minor planets: 262,001–263,000	Succeeded by 263,001–264,000
