= List of minor planets: 262001–263000 =

The following is a partial list of minor planets, running from minor-planet number 262001 through 263000, inclusive. The primary data for this and other partial lists is based on JPL's "Small-Body Orbital Elements" and data available from the Minor Planet Center. Critical list information is also provided by the MPC, unless otherwise specified from Lowell Observatory. A detailed description of the table's columns and additional sources are given on the main page including a complete list of every page in this series, and a statistical break-up on the dynamical classification of minor planets.

Also see the summary list of all named bodies in numerical and alphabetical order, and the corresponding naming citations for the number range of this particular list. New namings may only be added to this list after official publication, as the preannouncement of names is condemned by the Working Group for Small Bodies Nomenclature of the International Astronomical Union.

Near-Earth obj.	MBA (inner)	MBA (outer)	Centaur
Mars-crosser	MBA (middle)	Jupiter trojan	Trans-Neptunian obj.
Unclassified

== 262001–262100 ==
Designation			Discovery			Properties		Ref
Permanent	Provisional	Named after	Date	Site	Discoverer(s)	Category	Diam.	Ref
262001	2006 QB_{53}	—	August 23, 2006	Palomar	NEAT	·	2.1 km	MPC · JPL
262002	2006 QE_{57}	—	August 23, 2006	Mauna Kea	D. D. Balam	L4	10 km	MPC · JPL
262003	2006 QE_{60}	—	August 20, 2006	Palomar	NEAT	·	2.1 km	MPC · JPL
262004	2006 QZ_{60}	—	August 21, 2006	Socorro	LINEAR	NYS	1.2 km	MPC · JPL
262005	2006 QL_{63}	—	August 24, 2006	Socorro	LINEAR	·	1.0 km	MPC · JPL
262006	2006 QH_{73}	—	August 21, 2006	Kitt Peak	Spacewatch	(5)	1.3 km	MPC · JPL
262007	2006 QG_{77}	—	August 22, 2006	Palomar	NEAT	MAR	1.5 km	MPC · JPL
262008	2006 QK_{78}	—	August 22, 2006	Palomar	NEAT	·	1.0 km	MPC · JPL
262009	2006 QP_{78}	—	August 22, 2006	Palomar	NEAT	·	1.4 km	MPC · JPL
262010	2006 QS_{79}	—	August 24, 2006	Socorro	LINEAR	·	1.2 km	MPC · JPL
262011	2006 QH_{80}	—	August 24, 2006	Palomar	NEAT	·	900 m	MPC · JPL
262012	2006 QZ_{80}	—	August 24, 2006	Palomar	NEAT	MAS	860 m	MPC · JPL
262013	2006 QN_{82}	—	August 25, 2006	Socorro	LINEAR	·	980 m	MPC · JPL
262014	2006 QO_{84}	—	August 27, 2006	Kitt Peak	Spacewatch	·	1.7 km	MPC · JPL
262015	2006 QR_{87}	—	August 27, 2006	Kitt Peak	Spacewatch	·	3.0 km	MPC · JPL
262016	2006 QP_{95}	—	August 16, 2006	Palomar	NEAT	·	880 m	MPC · JPL
262017	2006 QS_{95}	—	August 16, 2006	Palomar	NEAT	·	930 m	MPC · JPL
262018	2006 QN_{98}	—	August 22, 2006	Palomar	NEAT	·	1.3 km	MPC · JPL
262019	2006 QQ_{98}	—	August 22, 2006	Palomar	NEAT	·	1.5 km	MPC · JPL
262020	2006 QL_{99}	—	August 23, 2006	Palomar	NEAT	NYS	1.4 km	MPC · JPL
262021	2006 QV_{104}	—	August 28, 2006	Socorro	LINEAR	·	980 m	MPC · JPL
262022	2006 QO_{106}	—	August 28, 2006	Catalina	CSS	·	890 m	MPC · JPL
262023	2006 QP_{109}	—	August 28, 2006	Kitt Peak	Spacewatch	·	1.2 km	MPC · JPL
262024	2006 QP_{110}	—	August 28, 2006	Anderson Mesa	LONEOS	·	1.3 km	MPC · JPL
262025	2006 QH_{111}	—	August 28, 2006	Lulin	Lin, H.-C., Q. Ye	·	1.8 km	MPC · JPL
262026	2006 QT_{111}	—	August 22, 2006	Palomar	NEAT	·	1.6 km	MPC · JPL
262027	2006 QA_{115}	—	August 27, 2006	Anderson Mesa	LONEOS	·	1.4 km	MPC · JPL
262028	2006 QG_{120}	—	August 29, 2006	Catalina	CSS	·	1.5 km	MPC · JPL
262029	2006 QH_{121}	—	August 29, 2006	Catalina	CSS	V	730 m	MPC · JPL
262030	2006 QE_{123}	—	August 29, 2006	Kitt Peak	Spacewatch	·	2.2 km	MPC · JPL
262031	2006 QD_{131}	—	August 20, 2006	Palomar	NEAT	·	1.5 km	MPC · JPL
262032	2006 QD_{132}	—	August 22, 2006	Palomar	NEAT	·	2.0 km	MPC · JPL
262033	2006 QZ_{132}	—	August 23, 2006	Palomar	NEAT	MAS	710 m	MPC · JPL
262034	2006 QD_{133}	—	August 23, 2006	Palomar	NEAT	·	1.2 km	MPC · JPL
262035	2006 QD_{134}	—	August 24, 2006	Palomar	NEAT	·	1.4 km	MPC · JPL
262036	2006 QD_{141}	—	August 18, 2006	Palomar	NEAT	·	1.5 km	MPC · JPL
262037	2006 QD_{142}	—	August 18, 2006	Palomar	NEAT	·	1.5 km	MPC · JPL
262038	2006 QT_{142}	—	August 30, 2006	Socorro	LINEAR	·	1.4 km	MPC · JPL
262039	2006 QL_{149}	—	August 18, 2006	Kitt Peak	Spacewatch	·	1.1 km	MPC · JPL
262040	2006 QS_{149}	—	August 18, 2006	Kitt Peak	Spacewatch	·	1.2 km	MPC · JPL
262041	2006 QG_{157}	—	August 19, 2006	Kitt Peak	Spacewatch	CLA	1.8 km	MPC · JPL
262042	2006 QS_{157}	—	August 19, 2006	Kitt Peak	Spacewatch	·	1.0 km	MPC · JPL
262043	2006 QE_{159}	—	August 19, 2006	Kitt Peak	Spacewatch	·	1.3 km	MPC · JPL
262044	2006 QD_{161}	—	August 19, 2006	Kitt Peak	Spacewatch	·	1.1 km	MPC · JPL
262045	2006 QT_{164}	—	August 29, 2006	Anderson Mesa	LONEOS	·	1.6 km	MPC · JPL
262046	2006 QD_{176}	—	August 22, 2006	Cerro Tololo	M. W. Buie	·	2.8 km	MPC · JPL
262047	2006 QN_{182}	—	August 28, 2006	Apache Point	A. C. Becker	MAS	660 m	MPC · JPL
262048	2006 QS_{182}	—	August 18, 2006	Kitt Peak	Spacewatch	·	800 m	MPC · JPL
262049	2006 QU_{182}	—	August 18, 2006	Kitt Peak	Spacewatch	NYS	810 m	MPC · JPL
262050	2006 QJ_{184}	—	August 18, 2006	Kitt Peak	Spacewatch	·	2.1 km	MPC · JPL
262051	2006 RP_{6}	—	September 14, 2006	Catalina	CSS	·	1.4 km	MPC · JPL
262052	2006 RX_{7}	—	September 12, 2006	Catalina	CSS	(2076)	1.1 km	MPC · JPL
262053	2006 RA_{8}	—	September 12, 2006	Catalina	CSS	·	1.2 km	MPC · JPL
262054	2006 RB_{8}	—	September 12, 2006	Catalina	CSS	·	1.5 km	MPC · JPL
262055	2006 RC_{16}	—	September 14, 2006	Palomar	NEAT	PHO	1.3 km	MPC · JPL
262056	2006 RK_{18}	—	September 14, 2006	Catalina	CSS	·	1.3 km	MPC · JPL
262057	2006 RM_{20}	—	September 15, 2006	Socorro	LINEAR	·	1.5 km	MPC · JPL
262058	2006 RJ_{27}	—	September 14, 2006	Catalina	CSS	·	1.5 km	MPC · JPL
262059	2006 RJ_{31}	—	September 15, 2006	Kitt Peak	Spacewatch	·	1.4 km	MPC · JPL
262060	2006 RO_{34}	—	September 13, 2006	Palomar	NEAT	·	920 m	MPC · JPL
262061	2006 RX_{34}	—	September 14, 2006	Palomar	NEAT	·	1.4 km	MPC · JPL
262062	2006 RK_{37}	—	September 12, 2006	Catalina	CSS	NYS	1.3 km	MPC · JPL
262063	2006 RM_{41}	—	September 14, 2006	Catalina	CSS	·	1.4 km	MPC · JPL
262064	2006 RD_{42}	—	September 14, 2006	Kitt Peak	Spacewatch	·	1.7 km	MPC · JPL
262065	2006 RH_{43}	—	September 14, 2006	Kitt Peak	Spacewatch	NYS	1 km	MPC · JPL
262066	2006 RF_{44}	—	September 14, 2006	Kitt Peak	Spacewatch	·	1.4 km	MPC · JPL
262067	2006 RY_{44}	—	September 14, 2006	Kitt Peak	Spacewatch	KOR	1.4 km	MPC · JPL
262068	2006 RV_{47}	—	September 14, 2006	Palomar	NEAT	·	1.1 km	MPC · JPL
262069	2006 RD_{49}	—	September 14, 2006	Kitt Peak	Spacewatch	·	800 m	MPC · JPL
262070	2006 RJ_{49}	—	September 14, 2006	Kitt Peak	Spacewatch	V	860 m	MPC · JPL
262071	2006 RY_{49}	—	September 14, 2006	Kitt Peak	Spacewatch	NYS	1.3 km	MPC · JPL
262072	2006 RL_{50}	—	September 14, 2006	Kitt Peak	Spacewatch	·	1.4 km	MPC · JPL
262073	2006 RW_{53}	—	September 14, 2006	Kitt Peak	Spacewatch	KOR	1.6 km	MPC · JPL
262074	2006 RR_{54}	—	September 14, 2006	Kitt Peak	Spacewatch	·	1.9 km	MPC · JPL
262075	2006 RE_{55}	—	September 14, 2006	Kitt Peak	Spacewatch	·	2.2 km	MPC · JPL
262076	2006 RV_{55}	—	September 14, 2006	Kitt Peak	Spacewatch	·	1.7 km	MPC · JPL
262077	2006 RN_{61}	—	September 12, 2006	Catalina	CSS	MAS	770 m	MPC · JPL
262078	2006 RC_{63}	—	September 14, 2006	Catalina	CSS	·	1.6 km	MPC · JPL
262079	2006 RF_{64}	—	September 12, 2006	Catalina	CSS	·	1.2 km	MPC · JPL
262080	2006 RF_{65}	—	September 14, 2006	Palomar	NEAT	·	1.3 km	MPC · JPL
262081	2006 RU_{65}	—	September 14, 2006	Catalina	CSS	·	960 m	MPC · JPL
262082	2006 RE_{68}	—	September 15, 2006	Kitt Peak	Spacewatch	·	940 m	MPC · JPL
262083	2006 RK_{68}	—	September 15, 2006	Kitt Peak	Spacewatch	·	1.6 km	MPC · JPL
262084	2006 RP_{69}	—	September 15, 2006	Kitt Peak	Spacewatch	MAS	730 m	MPC · JPL
262085	2006 RK_{75}	—	September 15, 2006	Kitt Peak	Spacewatch	·	910 m	MPC · JPL
262086	2006 RT_{75}	—	September 15, 2006	Kitt Peak	Spacewatch	(17392)	1.9 km	MPC · JPL
262087	2006 RE_{76}	—	September 15, 2006	Kitt Peak	Spacewatch	·	750 m	MPC · JPL
262088	2006 RW_{76}	—	September 15, 2006	Kitt Peak	Spacewatch	MAS	730 m	MPC · JPL
262089	2006 RG_{78}	—	September 15, 2006	Kitt Peak	Spacewatch	·	1.3 km	MPC · JPL
262090	2006 RO_{78}	—	September 15, 2006	Kitt Peak	Spacewatch	·	2.0 km	MPC · JPL
262091	2006 RY_{79}	—	September 15, 2006	Kitt Peak	Spacewatch	·	2.2 km	MPC · JPL
262092	2006 RP_{86}	—	September 15, 2006	Kitt Peak	Spacewatch	·	1.6 km	MPC · JPL
262093	2006 RT_{86}	—	September 15, 2006	Kitt Peak	Spacewatch	·	900 m	MPC · JPL
262094	2006 RF_{88}	—	September 15, 2006	Kitt Peak	Spacewatch	·	2.2 km	MPC · JPL
262095	2006 RG_{88}	—	September 15, 2006	Kitt Peak	Spacewatch	MAS	930 m	MPC · JPL
262096	2006 RL_{89}	—	September 15, 2006	Kitt Peak	Spacewatch	·	1.0 km	MPC · JPL
262097	2006 RO_{89}	—	September 15, 2006	Kitt Peak	Spacewatch	·	1.6 km	MPC · JPL
262098	2006 RD_{91}	—	September 15, 2006	Kitt Peak	Spacewatch	·	1.6 km	MPC · JPL
262099	2006 RD_{92}	—	September 15, 2006	Kitt Peak	Spacewatch	·	1.2 km	MPC · JPL
262100	2006 RG_{93}	—	September 15, 2006	Kitt Peak	Spacewatch	NYS	1.1 km	MPC · JPL

== 262101–262200 ==
back to top

Designation			Discovery			Properties		Ref
Permanent	Provisional	Named after	Date	Site	Discoverer(s)	Category	Diam.	Ref
262101	2006 RP_{97}	—	September 15, 2006	Kitt Peak	Spacewatch	·	1.1 km	MPC · JPL
262102	2006 RE_{98}	—	September 14, 2006	Palomar	NEAT	ERI	3.0 km	MPC · JPL
262103	2006 RN_{98}	—	September 14, 2006	Palomar	NEAT	EUN	1.3 km	MPC · JPL
262104	2006 RD_{101}	—	September 14, 2006	Catalina	CSS	·	1.4 km	MPC · JPL
262105	2006 RR_{104}	—	September 15, 2006	Apache Point	A. C. Becker	·	1.9 km	MPC · JPL
262106 Margaretryan	2006 RU_{108}	Margaretryan	September 14, 2006	Mauna Kea	Masiero, J.	MAS	690 m	MPC · JPL
262107	2006 RX_{120}	—	September 14, 2006	Kitt Peak	Spacewatch	·	1.7 km	MPC · JPL
262108	2006 RB_{122}	—	September 15, 2006	Kitt Peak	Spacewatch	·	1.1 km	MPC · JPL
262109	2006 RD_{122}	—	September 15, 2006	Kitt Peak	Spacewatch	·	890 m	MPC · JPL
262110	2006 SG	—	September 16, 2006	Cordell-Lorenz	Cordell-Lorenz	·	1.3 km	MPC · JPL
262111	2006 SL_{1}	—	September 16, 2006	Kitt Peak	Spacewatch	·	2.1 km	MPC · JPL
262112	2006 SE_{2}	—	September 16, 2006	Kitt Peak	Spacewatch	·	1.8 km	MPC · JPL
262113	2006 SN_{4}	—	September 16, 2006	Catalina	CSS	·	2.8 km	MPC · JPL
262114	2006 SV_{6}	—	September 16, 2006	Catalina	CSS	·	1.2 km	MPC · JPL
262115	2006 SG_{12}	—	September 16, 2006	Anderson Mesa	LONEOS	NEM	2.6 km	MPC · JPL
262116	2006 SE_{13}	—	September 17, 2006	Catalina	CSS	·	2.0 km	MPC · JPL
262117	2006 SE_{14}	—	September 17, 2006	Socorro	LINEAR	·	2.7 km	MPC · JPL
262118	2006 SF_{15}	—	September 17, 2006	Catalina	CSS	·	890 m	MPC · JPL
262119	2006 SY_{15}	—	September 17, 2006	Catalina	CSS	·	1.5 km	MPC · JPL
262120	2006 SR_{18}	—	September 17, 2006	Kitt Peak	Spacewatch	·	1.5 km	MPC · JPL
262121	2006 SS_{20}	—	September 18, 2006	Kitt Peak	Spacewatch	·	2.6 km	MPC · JPL
262122	2006 SW_{20}	—	September 16, 2006	Anderson Mesa	LONEOS	·	1.3 km	MPC · JPL
262123	2006 SX_{26}	—	September 16, 2006	Catalina	CSS	V	1.1 km	MPC · JPL
262124	2006 SL_{27}	—	September 16, 2006	Catalina	CSS	HNS	1.6 km	MPC · JPL
262125	2006 SW_{29}	—	September 17, 2006	Kitt Peak	Spacewatch	·	950 m	MPC · JPL
262126	2006 SX_{29}	—	September 17, 2006	Kitt Peak	Spacewatch	·	1.1 km	MPC · JPL
262127	2006 SH_{32}	—	September 17, 2006	Kitt Peak	Spacewatch	·	2.0 km	MPC · JPL
262128	2006 SV_{32}	—	September 17, 2006	Kitt Peak	Spacewatch	·	920 m	MPC · JPL
262129	2006 SJ_{34}	—	September 17, 2006	Catalina	CSS	V	940 m	MPC · JPL
262130	2006 SN_{45}	—	September 18, 2006	Catalina	CSS	·	1.7 km	MPC · JPL
262131	2006 SB_{51}	—	September 17, 2006	Catalina	CSS	EUN	1.4 km	MPC · JPL
262132	2006 SL_{51}	—	September 17, 2006	Anderson Mesa	LONEOS	·	2.2 km	MPC · JPL
262133	2006 ST_{54}	—	September 18, 2006	Catalina	CSS	·	980 m	MPC · JPL
262134	2006 SW_{59}	—	September 18, 2006	Catalina	CSS	·	1.5 km	MPC · JPL
262135	2006 SX_{60}	—	September 18, 2006	Catalina	CSS	·	1.3 km	MPC · JPL
262136	2006 SW_{61}	—	September 18, 2006	Catalina	CSS	NYS	1.1 km	MPC · JPL
262137	2006 SC_{62}	—	September 18, 2006	Catalina	CSS	·	1.9 km	MPC · JPL
262138	2006 SR_{62}	—	September 18, 2006	Catalina	CSS	·	1.2 km	MPC · JPL
262139	2006 SW_{62}	—	September 18, 2006	Catalina	CSS	·	1.1 km	MPC · JPL
262140	2006 SS_{65}	—	September 19, 2006	Kitt Peak	Spacewatch	V	970 m	MPC · JPL
262141	2006 SQ_{66}	—	September 19, 2006	Kitt Peak	Spacewatch	·	1.1 km	MPC · JPL
262142	2006 SX_{69}	—	September 19, 2006	Kitt Peak	Spacewatch	·	1.4 km	MPC · JPL
262143	2006 SY_{70}	—	September 19, 2006	Kitt Peak	Spacewatch	MAS	970 m	MPC · JPL
262144	2006 SO_{71}	—	September 19, 2006	Kitt Peak	Spacewatch	NYS	1.5 km	MPC · JPL
262145	2006 SF_{72}	—	September 19, 2006	Kitt Peak	Spacewatch	·	2.0 km	MPC · JPL
262146	2006 SB_{73}	—	September 19, 2006	Kitt Peak	Spacewatch	·	1.3 km	MPC · JPL
262147	2006 SC_{73}	—	September 19, 2006	Kitt Peak	Spacewatch	·	1.2 km	MPC · JPL
262148	2006 SZ_{73}	—	September 19, 2006	Kitt Peak	Spacewatch	NYS ·	1.5 km	MPC · JPL
262149	2006 SB_{75}	—	September 19, 2006	Kitt Peak	Spacewatch	MAS	960 m	MPC · JPL
262150	2006 SN_{75}	—	September 19, 2006	Kitt Peak	Spacewatch	·	2.1 km	MPC · JPL
262151	2006 SU_{75}	—	September 19, 2006	Kitt Peak	Spacewatch	·	1.2 km	MPC · JPL
262152	2006 SX_{75}	—	September 19, 2006	Kitt Peak	Spacewatch	·	2.5 km	MPC · JPL
262153	2006 SF_{80}	—	September 18, 2006	Kitt Peak	Spacewatch	·	1.6 km	MPC · JPL
262154	2006 SL_{82}	—	September 18, 2006	Kitt Peak	Spacewatch	·	1.8 km	MPC · JPL
262155	2006 SB_{83}	—	September 18, 2006	Kitt Peak	Spacewatch	·	1.5 km	MPC · JPL
262156	2006 SQ_{85}	—	September 18, 2006	Catalina	CSS	BAP	1.0 km	MPC · JPL
262157	2006 SY_{85}	—	September 18, 2006	Kitt Peak	Spacewatch	·	1.4 km	MPC · JPL
262158	2006 SX_{87}	—	September 18, 2006	Kitt Peak	Spacewatch	·	850 m	MPC · JPL
262159	2006 SV_{90}	—	September 18, 2006	Kitt Peak	Spacewatch	·	740 m	MPC · JPL
262160	2006 SR_{91}	—	September 18, 2006	Kitt Peak	Spacewatch	·	2.1 km	MPC · JPL
262161	2006 SQ_{92}	—	September 18, 2006	Kitt Peak	Spacewatch	·	2.0 km	MPC · JPL
262162	2006 SZ_{93}	—	September 18, 2006	Kitt Peak	Spacewatch	MAS	760 m	MPC · JPL
262163	2006 SG_{94}	—	September 18, 2006	Kitt Peak	Spacewatch	PHO	990 m	MPC · JPL
262164	2006 SN_{97}	—	September 18, 2006	Kitt Peak	Spacewatch	·	1.2 km	MPC · JPL
262165	2006 SE_{102}	—	September 19, 2006	Kitt Peak	Spacewatch	NYS	1.2 km	MPC · JPL
262166	2006 SP_{103}	—	September 19, 2006	Kitt Peak	Spacewatch	·	1.2 km	MPC · JPL
262167	2006 SN_{107}	—	September 19, 2006	Catalina	CSS	·	1.6 km	MPC · JPL
262168	2006 SU_{109}	—	September 20, 2006	Kitt Peak	Spacewatch	·	920 m	MPC · JPL
262169	2006 SW_{110}	—	September 20, 2006	Haleakala	NEAT	·	1.9 km	MPC · JPL
262170	2006 SK_{112}	—	September 23, 2006	Kitt Peak	Spacewatch	·	3.1 km	MPC · JPL
262171	2006 SP_{114}	—	September 23, 2006	Kitt Peak	Spacewatch	·	2.1 km	MPC · JPL
262172	2006 SE_{115}	—	September 24, 2006	Kitt Peak	Spacewatch	·	1.8 km	MPC · JPL
262173	2006 SZ_{116}	—	September 24, 2006	Kitt Peak	Spacewatch	ERI	1.7 km	MPC · JPL
262174	2006 SP_{117}	—	September 24, 2006	Kitt Peak	Spacewatch	NYS	1.3 km	MPC · JPL
262175	2006 SA_{120}	—	September 18, 2006	Catalina	CSS	·	1.2 km	MPC · JPL
262176	2006 SC_{120}	—	September 18, 2006	Catalina	CSS	(5)	1.2 km	MPC · JPL
262177	2006 SF_{120}	—	September 18, 2006	Catalina	CSS	·	1.0 km	MPC · JPL
262178	2006 SF_{121}	—	September 18, 2006	Catalina	CSS	V	850 m	MPC · JPL
262179	2006 SW_{125}	—	September 20, 2006	Palomar	NEAT	·	2.2 km	MPC · JPL
262180	2006 SV_{131}	—	September 16, 2006	Catalina	CSS	·	2.0 km	MPC · JPL
262181	2006 SJ_{132}	—	September 16, 2006	Catalina	CSS	V	830 m	MPC · JPL
262182	2006 SE_{138}	—	September 20, 2006	Catalina	CSS	EUN	1.5 km	MPC · JPL
262183	2006 SN_{138}	—	September 20, 2006	Anderson Mesa	LONEOS	V	850 m	MPC · JPL
262184	2006 SS_{140}	—	September 22, 2006	Catalina	CSS	MAR	1.5 km	MPC · JPL
262185	2006 ST_{141}	—	September 25, 2006	Anderson Mesa	LONEOS	·	1.4 km	MPC · JPL
262186	2006 SY_{141}	—	September 26, 2006	Catalina	CSS	·	1.3 km	MPC · JPL
262187	2006 SK_{143}	—	September 19, 2006	Kitt Peak	Spacewatch	·	950 m	MPC · JPL
262188	2006 SQ_{144}	—	September 19, 2006	Kitt Peak	Spacewatch	NYS	1.2 km	MPC · JPL
262189	2006 SF_{145}	—	September 19, 2006	Kitt Peak	Spacewatch	·	1.1 km	MPC · JPL
262190	2006 SH_{151}	—	September 19, 2006	Kitt Peak	Spacewatch	·	1.4 km	MPC · JPL
262191	2006 SQ_{151}	—	September 19, 2006	Kitt Peak	Spacewatch	·	1.6 km	MPC · JPL
262192	2006 SR_{151}	—	September 19, 2006	Kitt Peak	Spacewatch	·	1.1 km	MPC · JPL
262193	2006 SG_{155}	—	September 22, 2006	Catalina	CSS	·	3.4 km	MPC · JPL
262194	2006 SM_{161}	—	September 23, 2006	Kitt Peak	Spacewatch	MAS	790 m	MPC · JPL
262195	2006 ST_{165}	—	September 25, 2006	Kitt Peak	Spacewatch	·	1.4 km	MPC · JPL
262196	2006 SB_{166}	—	September 25, 2006	Kitt Peak	Spacewatch	·	1.2 km	MPC · JPL
262197	2006 SG_{166}	—	September 25, 2006	Kitt Peak	Spacewatch	·	930 m	MPC · JPL
262198	2006 SS_{167}	—	September 25, 2006	Kitt Peak	Spacewatch	·	1.0 km	MPC · JPL
262199	2006 SY_{167}	—	September 25, 2006	Kitt Peak	Spacewatch	·	1.2 km	MPC · JPL
262200	2006 SA_{173}	—	September 25, 2006	Kitt Peak	Spacewatch	·	590 m	MPC · JPL

== 262201–262300 ==
back to top

Designation			Discovery			Properties		Ref
Permanent	Provisional	Named after	Date	Site	Discoverer(s)	Category	Diam.	Ref
262201	2006 SH_{184}	—	September 25, 2006	Kitt Peak	Spacewatch	V	820 m	MPC · JPL
262202	2006 SK_{187}	—	September 26, 2006	Kitt Peak	Spacewatch	·	1.5 km	MPC · JPL
262203	2006 SC_{193}	—	September 26, 2006	Mount Lemmon	Mount Lemmon Survey	·	3.7 km	MPC · JPL
262204	2006 SU_{205}	—	September 25, 2006	Anderson Mesa	LONEOS	·	3.3 km	MPC · JPL
262205	2006 SV_{205}	—	September 25, 2006	Anderson Mesa	LONEOS	NYS	1.3 km	MPC · JPL
262206	2006 SU_{206}	—	September 25, 2006	Mount Lemmon	Mount Lemmon Survey	·	1.6 km	MPC · JPL
262207	2006 SJ_{208}	—	September 26, 2006	Socorro	LINEAR	·	890 m	MPC · JPL
262208	2006 SU_{211}	—	September 26, 2006	Mount Lemmon	Mount Lemmon Survey	MAS	700 m	MPC · JPL
262209	2006 SK_{212}	—	September 26, 2006	Kitt Peak	Spacewatch	·	1.6 km	MPC · JPL
262210	2006 SC_{216}	—	September 27, 2006	Kitt Peak	Spacewatch	·	1.3 km	MPC · JPL
262211	2006 SK_{217}	—	September 28, 2006	Kitt Peak	Spacewatch	·	1.3 km	MPC · JPL
262212	2006 SX_{220}	—	September 25, 2006	Mount Lemmon	Mount Lemmon Survey	NYS	890 m	MPC · JPL
262213	2006 SQ_{222}	—	September 25, 2006	Mount Lemmon	Mount Lemmon Survey	MAS	790 m	MPC · JPL
262214	2006 SF_{224}	—	September 25, 2006	Mount Lemmon	Mount Lemmon Survey	·	1.4 km	MPC · JPL
262215	2006 SO_{229}	—	September 26, 2006	Kitt Peak	Spacewatch	·	1.9 km	MPC · JPL
262216	2006 SN_{230}	—	September 26, 2006	Kitt Peak	Spacewatch	·	1.0 km	MPC · JPL
262217	2006 SR_{231}	—	September 26, 2006	Socorro	LINEAR	·	2.0 km	MPC · JPL
262218	2006 SG_{239}	—	September 26, 2006	Kitt Peak	Spacewatch	HOF	2.7 km	MPC · JPL
262219	2006 SB_{249}	—	September 26, 2006	Kitt Peak	Spacewatch	AGN	1.4 km	MPC · JPL
262220	2006 SN_{251}	—	September 26, 2006	Kitt Peak	Spacewatch	·	2.3 km	MPC · JPL
262221	2006 SA_{261}	—	September 26, 2006	Kitt Peak	Spacewatch	(5)	1.5 km	MPC · JPL
262222	2006 SG_{265}	—	September 26, 2006	Kitt Peak	Spacewatch	·	1.1 km	MPC · JPL
262223	2006 SE_{267}	—	September 26, 2006	Kitt Peak	Spacewatch	·	1.5 km	MPC · JPL
262224	2006 SO_{267}	—	September 26, 2006	Kitt Peak	Spacewatch	·	2.3 km	MPC · JPL
262225	2006 SM_{268}	—	September 26, 2006	Kitt Peak	Spacewatch	·	2.7 km	MPC · JPL
262226	2006 SU_{270}	—	September 27, 2006	Anderson Mesa	LONEOS	·	2.0 km	MPC · JPL
262227	2006 SO_{274}	—	September 27, 2006	Mount Lemmon	Mount Lemmon Survey	·	1.1 km	MPC · JPL
262228	2006 SC_{280}	—	September 29, 2006	Anderson Mesa	LONEOS	MRX	1.5 km	MPC · JPL
262229	2006 SE_{280}	—	September 29, 2006	Anderson Mesa	LONEOS	NYS	1.6 km	MPC · JPL
262230	2006 SL_{280}	—	September 29, 2006	Anderson Mesa	LONEOS	·	1.1 km	MPC · JPL
262231	2006 SR_{282}	—	September 25, 2006	Anderson Mesa	LONEOS	·	2.2 km	MPC · JPL
262232	2006 SL_{283}	—	September 26, 2006	Socorro	LINEAR	·	2.5 km	MPC · JPL
262233	2006 SD_{284}	—	September 26, 2006	Catalina	CSS	·	1.1 km	MPC · JPL
262234	2006 SF_{284}	—	September 27, 2006	Anderson Mesa	LONEOS	·	2.4 km	MPC · JPL
262235	2006 SR_{284}	—	September 28, 2006	Socorro	LINEAR	·	1.4 km	MPC · JPL
262236	2006 ST_{284}	—	September 28, 2006	Catalina	CSS	·	1.9 km	MPC · JPL
262237	2006 SA_{286}	—	September 18, 2006	Catalina	CSS	·	3.1 km	MPC · JPL
262238	2006 SU_{286}	—	September 22, 2006	San Marcello	San Marcello	·	2.5 km	MPC · JPL
262239	2006 SB_{287}	—	September 22, 2006	Socorro	LINEAR	JUN	1.1 km	MPC · JPL
262240	2006 SP_{287}	—	September 22, 2006	Catalina	CSS	·	1.1 km	MPC · JPL
262241	2006 SU_{289}	—	September 26, 2006	Catalina	CSS	·	1.5 km	MPC · JPL
262242	2006 SW_{289}	—	September 26, 2006	Catalina	CSS	·	2.7 km	MPC · JPL
262243	2006 SV_{290}	—	September 25, 2006	Kitt Peak	Spacewatch	·	1.7 km	MPC · JPL
262244	2006 SS_{292}	—	September 25, 2006	Kitt Peak	Spacewatch	·	2.0 km	MPC · JPL
262245	2006 SD_{299}	—	September 26, 2006	Kitt Peak	Spacewatch	·	810 m	MPC · JPL
262246	2006 SJ_{299}	—	September 26, 2006	Mount Lemmon	Mount Lemmon Survey	·	1.1 km	MPC · JPL
262247	2006 SW_{302}	—	September 27, 2006	Kitt Peak	Spacewatch	·	2.2 km	MPC · JPL
262248	2006 SM_{304}	—	September 27, 2006	Catalina	CSS	·	1.4 km	MPC · JPL
262249	2006 SP_{304}	—	September 27, 2006	Kitt Peak	Spacewatch	·	1.8 km	MPC · JPL
262250	2006 SR_{306}	—	September 27, 2006	Mount Lemmon	Mount Lemmon Survey	AGN	1.4 km	MPC · JPL
262251	2006 SY_{309}	—	September 27, 2006	Kitt Peak	Spacewatch	·	1.6 km	MPC · JPL
262252	2006 SC_{310}	—	September 27, 2006	Kitt Peak	Spacewatch	·	1.4 km	MPC · JPL
262253	2006 SD_{313}	—	September 27, 2006	Kitt Peak	Spacewatch	MIS	2.3 km	MPC · JPL
262254	2006 SH_{316}	—	September 27, 2006	Kitt Peak	Spacewatch	AGN	1.4 km	MPC · JPL
262255	2006 SD_{318}	—	September 27, 2006	Kitt Peak	Spacewatch	·	3.0 km	MPC · JPL
262256	2006 SC_{324}	—	September 27, 2006	Kitt Peak	Spacewatch	·	910 m	MPC · JPL
262257	2006 SF_{326}	—	September 27, 2006	Kitt Peak	Spacewatch	·	1.4 km	MPC · JPL
262258	2006 SA_{327}	—	September 27, 2006	Kitt Peak	Spacewatch	·	890 m	MPC · JPL
262259	2006 SJ_{328}	—	September 27, 2006	Kitt Peak	Spacewatch	NYS	1.3 km	MPC · JPL
262260	2006 SW_{329}	—	September 27, 2006	Kitt Peak	Spacewatch	·	2.6 km	MPC · JPL
262261	2006 SG_{330}	—	September 27, 2006	Kitt Peak	Spacewatch	·	1.6 km	MPC · JPL
262262	2006 ST_{338}	—	September 28, 2006	Kitt Peak	Spacewatch	·	1.6 km	MPC · JPL
262263	2006 SU_{338}	—	September 28, 2006	Kitt Peak	Spacewatch	NYS	1.0 km	MPC · JPL
262264	2006 SM_{342}	—	September 28, 2006	Kitt Peak	Spacewatch	SUL	2.6 km	MPC · JPL
262265	2006 SA_{345}	—	September 28, 2006	Kitt Peak	Spacewatch	·	2.7 km	MPC · JPL
262266	2006 SS_{345}	—	September 28, 2006	Kitt Peak	Spacewatch	·	780 m	MPC · JPL
262267	2006 SH_{347}	—	September 28, 2006	Kitt Peak	Spacewatch	KOR	1.5 km	MPC · JPL
262268	2006 ST_{347}	—	September 28, 2006	Kitt Peak	Spacewatch	·	1.2 km	MPC · JPL
262269	2006 SD_{348}	—	September 28, 2006	Kitt Peak	Spacewatch	·	1.2 km	MPC · JPL
262270	2006 SD_{353}	—	September 30, 2006	Catalina	CSS	·	3.9 km	MPC · JPL
262271	2006 SZ_{353}	—	September 30, 2006	Catalina	CSS	·	1.7 km	MPC · JPL
262272	2006 SM_{354}	—	September 30, 2006	Catalina	CSS	·	1.9 km	MPC · JPL
262273	2006 ST_{355}	—	September 30, 2006	Catalina	CSS	NYS	1.2 km	MPC · JPL
262274	2006 SL_{356}	—	September 30, 2006	Catalina	CSS	·	1.5 km	MPC · JPL
262275	2006 SB_{357}	—	September 30, 2006	Catalina	CSS	·	1.3 km	MPC · JPL
262276	2006 SJ_{359}	—	September 30, 2006	Catalina	CSS	(17392)	1.8 km	MPC · JPL
262277	2006 SJ_{360}	—	September 30, 2006	Mount Lemmon	Mount Lemmon Survey	·	1.6 km	MPC · JPL
262278	2006 SZ_{360}	—	September 30, 2006	Mount Lemmon	Mount Lemmon Survey	KOR	1.5 km	MPC · JPL
262279	2006 SK_{363}	—	September 30, 2006	Mount Lemmon	Mount Lemmon Survey	·	2.5 km	MPC · JPL
262280	2006 SP_{363}	—	September 30, 2006	Mount Lemmon	Mount Lemmon Survey	·	2.5 km	MPC · JPL
262281	2006 SR_{363}	—	September 30, 2006	Mount Lemmon	Mount Lemmon Survey	·	2.3 km	MPC · JPL
262282	2006 SH_{365}	—	September 30, 2006	Catalina	CSS	·	2.1 km	MPC · JPL
262283	2006 SM_{367}	—	September 25, 2006	Catalina	CSS	·	3.2 km	MPC · JPL
262284 Kanišauskas	2006 SA_{369}	Kanišauskas	September 24, 2006	Moletai	Molėtai	GEF	1.6 km	MPC · JPL
262285	2006 SU_{374}	—	September 16, 2006	Apache Point	A. C. Becker	·	1.5 km	MPC · JPL
262286	2006 SW_{377}	—	September 17, 2006	Apache Point	A. C. Becker	·	1.3 km	MPC · JPL
262287	2006 SY_{378}	—	September 18, 2006	Apache Point	A. C. Becker	·	2.4 km	MPC · JPL
262288	2006 SX_{390}	—	September 17, 2006	Kitt Peak	Spacewatch	·	1.9 km	MPC · JPL
262289	2006 SS_{391}	—	September 18, 2006	Kitt Peak	Spacewatch	·	1.9 km	MPC · JPL
262290	2006 SC_{392}	—	September 19, 2006	Kitt Peak	Spacewatch	·	2.3 km	MPC · JPL
262291	2006 SW_{392}	—	September 27, 2006	Mount Lemmon	Mount Lemmon Survey	·	1.9 km	MPC · JPL
262292	2006 SR_{393}	—	September 30, 2006	Kitt Peak	Spacewatch	·	1.2 km	MPC · JPL
262293	2006 SU_{393}	—	September 30, 2006	Mount Lemmon	Mount Lemmon Survey	·	1.7 km	MPC · JPL
262294	2006 SA_{394}	—	September 30, 2006	Kitt Peak	Spacewatch	·	3.4 km	MPC · JPL
262295 Jeffrich	2006 SY_{395}	Jeffrich	September 17, 2006	Mauna Kea	Masiero, J.	MAS	640 m	MPC · JPL
262296	2006 SZ_{403}	—	September 30, 2006	Mount Lemmon	Mount Lemmon Survey	ADE	2.2 km	MPC · JPL
262297	2006 SO_{404}	—	September 30, 2006	Mount Lemmon	Mount Lemmon Survey	·	1.5 km	MPC · JPL
262298	2006 SP_{407}	—	September 16, 2006	Anderson Mesa	LONEOS	·	1.5 km	MPC · JPL
262299	2006 SW_{408}	—	September 27, 2006	Mount Lemmon	Mount Lemmon Survey	KOR	1.4 km	MPC · JPL
262300	2006 SV_{411}	—	September 18, 2006	Catalina	CSS	·	2.3 km	MPC · JPL

== 262301–262400 ==
back to top

Designation			Discovery			Properties		Ref
Permanent	Provisional	Named after	Date	Site	Discoverer(s)	Category	Diam.	Ref
262301	2006 SC_{413}	—	September 19, 2006	Catalina	CSS	PHO	1.2 km	MPC · JPL
262302	2006 TY	—	October 1, 2006	Great Shefford	Birtwhistle, P.	ADE	2.2 km	MPC · JPL
262303	2006 TE_{3}	—	October 2, 2006	Catalina	CSS	V	890 m	MPC · JPL
262304	2006 TY_{5}	—	October 2, 2006	Mount Lemmon	Mount Lemmon Survey	·	1.4 km	MPC · JPL
262305	2006 TO_{6}	—	October 3, 2006	Mount Lemmon	Mount Lemmon Survey	·	1.6 km	MPC · JPL
262306	2006 TV_{10}	—	October 11, 2006	Kitt Peak	Spacewatch	·	1.8 km	MPC · JPL
262307	2006 TZ_{10}	—	October 15, 2006	Herrenberg	Herrenberg	·	4.4 km	MPC · JPL
262308	2006 TD_{11}	—	October 13, 2006	Kitt Peak	Spacewatch	·	2.2 km	MPC · JPL
262309	2006 TZ_{12}	—	October 10, 2006	Palomar	NEAT	·	1.9 km	MPC · JPL
262310	2006 TG_{13}	—	October 10, 2006	Palomar	NEAT	·	1.5 km	MPC · JPL
262311	2006 TR_{13}	—	October 10, 2006	Palomar	NEAT	(5)	1.9 km	MPC · JPL
262312	2006 TS_{13}	—	October 10, 2006	Palomar	NEAT	·	1.6 km	MPC · JPL
262313	2006 TJ_{14}	—	October 10, 2006	Palomar	NEAT	·	2.9 km	MPC · JPL
262314	2006 TN_{15}	—	October 11, 2006	Kitt Peak	Spacewatch	HOF	4.1 km	MPC · JPL
262315	2006 TU_{18}	—	October 11, 2006	Kitt Peak	Spacewatch	·	1.8 km	MPC · JPL
262316	2006 TW_{18}	—	October 11, 2006	Kitt Peak	Spacewatch	·	2.4 km	MPC · JPL
262317	2006 TE_{19}	—	October 11, 2006	Kitt Peak	Spacewatch	V	900 m	MPC · JPL
262318	2006 TX_{19}	—	October 11, 2006	Kitt Peak	Spacewatch	AGN	1.3 km	MPC · JPL
262319	2006 TP_{24}	—	October 12, 2006	Kitt Peak	Spacewatch	·	1.4 km	MPC · JPL
262320	2006 TF_{26}	—	October 12, 2006	Kitt Peak	Spacewatch	V	740 m	MPC · JPL
262321	2006 TH_{26}	—	October 12, 2006	Kitt Peak	Spacewatch	NYS	1.4 km	MPC · JPL
262322	2006 TT_{26}	—	October 12, 2006	Kitt Peak	Spacewatch	·	2.3 km	MPC · JPL
262323	2006 TO_{27}	—	October 12, 2006	Kitt Peak	Spacewatch	·	3.5 km	MPC · JPL
262324	2006 TR_{27}	—	October 12, 2006	Kitt Peak	Spacewatch	KOR	1.5 km	MPC · JPL
262325	2006 TN_{29}	—	October 12, 2006	Kitt Peak	Spacewatch	·	1.7 km	MPC · JPL
262326	2006 TG_{31}	—	October 12, 2006	Kitt Peak	Spacewatch	KOR	1.4 km	MPC · JPL
262327	2006 TO_{32}	—	October 12, 2006	Kitt Peak	Spacewatch	·	2.7 km	MPC · JPL
262328	2006 TR_{32}	—	October 12, 2006	Kitt Peak	Spacewatch	·	1.9 km	MPC · JPL
262329	2006 TA_{36}	—	October 12, 2006	Kitt Peak	Spacewatch	·	2.2 km	MPC · JPL
262330	2006 TE_{36}	—	October 12, 2006	Kitt Peak	Spacewatch	NYS	1.5 km	MPC · JPL
262331	2006 TK_{37}	—	October 12, 2006	Kitt Peak	Spacewatch	·	2.0 km	MPC · JPL
262332	2006 TP_{37}	—	October 12, 2006	Kitt Peak	Spacewatch	·	1.4 km	MPC · JPL
262333	2006 TR_{40}	—	October 12, 2006	Kitt Peak	Spacewatch	·	1.9 km	MPC · JPL
262334	2006 TE_{41}	—	October 12, 2006	Kitt Peak	Spacewatch	·	2.4 km	MPC · JPL
262335	2006 TK_{41}	—	October 12, 2006	Kitt Peak	Spacewatch	·	1.6 km	MPC · JPL
262336	2006 TE_{42}	—	October 12, 2006	Kitt Peak	Spacewatch	·	2.1 km	MPC · JPL
262337	2006 TM_{43}	—	October 12, 2006	Kitt Peak	Spacewatch	·	1.6 km	MPC · JPL
262338	2006 TN_{43}	—	October 12, 2006	Kitt Peak	Spacewatch	·	1.9 km	MPC · JPL
262339	2006 TR_{43}	—	October 12, 2006	Kitt Peak	Spacewatch	·	1.4 km	MPC · JPL
262340	2006 TX_{49}	—	October 12, 2006	Palomar	NEAT	MAS	940 m	MPC · JPL
262341	2006 TJ_{52}	—	October 12, 2006	Kitt Peak	Spacewatch	MAS	950 m	MPC · JPL
262342	2006 TW_{52}	—	October 12, 2006	Kitt Peak	Spacewatch	·	1.6 km	MPC · JPL
262343	2006 TY_{54}	—	October 12, 2006	Palomar	NEAT	·	1.5 km	MPC · JPL
262344	2006 TM_{61}	—	October 15, 2006	Lulin	Lin, C.-S., Q. Ye	·	2.4 km	MPC · JPL
262345	2006 TX_{61}	—	October 9, 2006	Palomar	NEAT	·	3.6 km	MPC · JPL
262346	2006 TL_{62}	—	October 9, 2006	Palomar	NEAT	·	2.4 km	MPC · JPL
262347	2006 TU_{62}	—	October 10, 2006	Palomar	NEAT	·	1.4 km	MPC · JPL
262348	2006 TJ_{63}	—	October 10, 2006	Palomar	NEAT	(194)	1.9 km	MPC · JPL
262349	2006 TQ_{66}	—	October 11, 2006	Palomar	NEAT	·	1.7 km	MPC · JPL
262350	2006 TR_{67}	—	October 11, 2006	Kitt Peak	Spacewatch	·	2.0 km	MPC · JPL
262351	2006 TR_{69}	—	October 11, 2006	Palomar	NEAT	·	1.9 km	MPC · JPL
262352	2006 TL_{70}	—	October 11, 2006	Palomar	NEAT	·	1.9 km	MPC · JPL
262353	2006 TS_{70}	—	October 11, 2006	Palomar	NEAT	NYS	1.7 km	MPC · JPL
262354	2006 TK_{72}	—	October 11, 2006	Palomar	NEAT	·	2.0 km	MPC · JPL
262355	2006 TN_{73}	—	October 11, 2006	Palomar	NEAT	·	1.6 km	MPC · JPL
262356	2006 TY_{74}	—	October 11, 2006	Palomar	NEAT	MAR	1.3 km	MPC · JPL
262357	2006 TL_{77}	—	October 11, 2006	Palomar	NEAT	·	2.0 km	MPC · JPL
262358	2006 TE_{81}	—	October 13, 2006	Kitt Peak	Spacewatch	·	990 m	MPC · JPL
262359	2006 TL_{83}	—	October 13, 2006	Kitt Peak	Spacewatch	·	900 m	MPC · JPL
262360	2006 TA_{84}	—	October 13, 2006	Kitt Peak	Spacewatch	·	1.8 km	MPC · JPL
262361	2006 TC_{84}	—	October 13, 2006	Kitt Peak	Spacewatch	·	4.5 km	MPC · JPL
262362	2006 TK_{85}	—	October 13, 2006	Kitt Peak	Spacewatch	·	2.2 km	MPC · JPL
262363	2006 TM_{86}	—	October 13, 2006	Kitt Peak	Spacewatch	·	1.5 km	MPC · JPL
262364	2006 TR_{87}	—	October 13, 2006	Kitt Peak	Spacewatch	·	1.9 km	MPC · JPL
262365	2006 TF_{89}	—	October 13, 2006	Kitt Peak	Spacewatch	NYS	1.1 km	MPC · JPL
262366	2006 TH_{89}	—	October 13, 2006	Kitt Peak	Spacewatch	·	1.7 km	MPC · JPL
262367	2006 TD_{90}	—	October 13, 2006	Kitt Peak	Spacewatch	·	2.0 km	MPC · JPL
262368	2006 TX_{90}	—	October 13, 2006	Kitt Peak	Spacewatch	NYS	1.4 km	MPC · JPL
262369	2006 TN_{93}	—	October 15, 2006	Kitt Peak	Spacewatch	·	1.7 km	MPC · JPL
262370	2006 TX_{94}	—	October 15, 2006	Lulin	Lin, C.-S., Q. Ye	·	1.1 km	MPC · JPL
262371	2006 TZ_{98}	—	October 15, 2006	Kitt Peak	Spacewatch	·	870 m	MPC · JPL
262372	2006 TA_{99}	—	October 15, 2006	Kitt Peak	Spacewatch	·	1.6 km	MPC · JPL
262373	2006 TB_{99}	—	October 15, 2006	Kitt Peak	Spacewatch	·	1.8 km	MPC · JPL
262374	2006 TX_{99}	—	October 15, 2006	Kitt Peak	Spacewatch	·	1.0 km	MPC · JPL
262375	2006 TK_{101}	—	October 15, 2006	Kitt Peak	Spacewatch	·	1.4 km	MPC · JPL
262376	2006 TS_{101}	—	October 15, 2006	Kitt Peak	Spacewatch	·	1.7 km	MPC · JPL
262377	2006 TX_{102}	—	October 15, 2006	Kitt Peak	Spacewatch	·	1.1 km	MPC · JPL
262378	2006 TE_{109}	—	October 3, 2006	Mount Lemmon	Mount Lemmon Survey	NYS	1.5 km	MPC · JPL
262379	2006 TM_{110}	—	October 13, 2006	Kitt Peak	Spacewatch	NYS	1.3 km	MPC · JPL
262380	2006 TJ_{111}	—	October 1, 2006	Apache Point	A. C. Becker	·	860 m	MPC · JPL
262381	2006 TV_{111}	—	October 1, 2006	Apache Point	A. C. Becker	·	2.4 km	MPC · JPL
262382	2006 TG_{124}	—	October 2, 2006	Mount Lemmon	Mount Lemmon Survey	EOS	2.9 km	MPC · JPL
262383	2006 TY_{126}	—	October 3, 2006	Mount Lemmon	Mount Lemmon Survey	·	1.1 km	MPC · JPL
262384	2006 TX_{127}	—	October 12, 2006	Palomar	NEAT	·	2.4 km	MPC · JPL
262385	2006 UT	—	October 16, 2006	Altschwendt	W. Ries	·	1.0 km	MPC · JPL
262386	2006 UD_{1}	—	October 17, 2006	Altschwendt	W. Ries	·	2.2 km	MPC · JPL
262387	2006 UM_{3}	—	October 16, 2006	Catalina	CSS	NYS	1.4 km	MPC · JPL
262388	2006 UC_{4}	—	October 18, 2006	Piszkéstető	K. Sárneczky	·	1.2 km	MPC · JPL
262389	2006 UP_{6}	—	October 16, 2006	Catalina	CSS	·	1.9 km	MPC · JPL
262390	2006 UH_{9}	—	October 16, 2006	Catalina	CSS	AGN	1.6 km	MPC · JPL
262391	2006 UK_{9}	—	October 16, 2006	Kitt Peak	Spacewatch	·	3.0 km	MPC · JPL
262392	2006 UU_{9}	—	October 16, 2006	Catalina	CSS	HNS	1.6 km	MPC · JPL
262393	2006 UW_{9}	—	October 16, 2006	Kitt Peak	Spacewatch	·	900 m	MPC · JPL
262394	2006 UO_{10}	—	October 17, 2006	Mount Lemmon	Mount Lemmon Survey	·	1.3 km	MPC · JPL
262395	2006 US_{10}	—	October 17, 2006	Mount Lemmon	Mount Lemmon Survey	·	1.1 km	MPC · JPL
262396	2006 UV_{10}	—	October 17, 2006	Mount Lemmon	Mount Lemmon Survey	·	1.1 km	MPC · JPL
262397	2006 UM_{11}	—	October 17, 2006	Mount Lemmon	Mount Lemmon Survey	MRX	1.5 km	MPC · JPL
262398	2006 UN_{11}	—	October 17, 2006	Mount Lemmon	Mount Lemmon Survey	·	1.9 km	MPC · JPL
262399	2006 UO_{11}	—	October 17, 2006	Mount Lemmon	Mount Lemmon Survey	·	1.7 km	MPC · JPL
262400	2006 UT_{12}	—	October 17, 2006	Mount Lemmon	Mount Lemmon Survey	·	2.5 km	MPC · JPL

== 262401–262500 ==
back to top

Designation			Discovery			Properties		Ref
Permanent	Provisional	Named after	Date	Site	Discoverer(s)	Category	Diam.	Ref
262401	2006 UU_{12}	—	October 17, 2006	Mount Lemmon	Mount Lemmon Survey	·	1.7 km	MPC · JPL
262402	2006 UX_{13}	—	October 17, 2006	Mount Lemmon	Mount Lemmon Survey	MAS	790 m	MPC · JPL
262403	2006 UE_{18}	—	October 16, 2006	Mount Lemmon	Mount Lemmon Survey	·	1.1 km	MPC · JPL
262404	2006 UV_{19}	—	October 16, 2006	Kitt Peak	Spacewatch	·	2.4 km	MPC · JPL
262405	2006 UX_{20}	—	October 16, 2006	Kitt Peak	Spacewatch	NYS	800 m	MPC · JPL
262406	2006 UO_{21}	—	October 16, 2006	Kitt Peak	Spacewatch	·	2.7 km	MPC · JPL
262407	2006 UE_{22}	—	October 16, 2006	Mount Lemmon	Mount Lemmon Survey	·	1.8 km	MPC · JPL
262408	2006 UE_{23}	—	October 16, 2006	Kitt Peak	Spacewatch	·	1.1 km	MPC · JPL
262409	2006 US_{33}	—	October 16, 2006	Kitt Peak	Spacewatch	·	1.4 km	MPC · JPL
262410	2006 UF_{42}	—	October 16, 2006	Kitt Peak	Spacewatch	·	1.4 km	MPC · JPL
262411	2006 UN_{42}	—	October 16, 2006	Kitt Peak	Spacewatch	·	1.7 km	MPC · JPL
262412	2006 UG_{43}	—	October 16, 2006	Kitt Peak	Spacewatch	·	3.2 km	MPC · JPL
262413	2006 UQ_{44}	—	October 16, 2006	Kitt Peak	Spacewatch	·	1.2 km	MPC · JPL
262414	2006 UB_{45}	—	October 16, 2006	Kitt Peak	Spacewatch	·	1.6 km	MPC · JPL
262415	2006 UF_{45}	—	October 16, 2006	Kitt Peak	Spacewatch	·	1.6 km	MPC · JPL
262416	2006 UJ_{51}	—	October 17, 2006	Mount Lemmon	Mount Lemmon Survey	NYS	910 m	MPC · JPL
262417	2006 UD_{60}	—	October 19, 2006	Catalina	CSS	·	2.8 km	MPC · JPL
262418 Samofalov	2006 UV_{61}	Samofalov	October 17, 2006	Andrushivka	Andrushivka	V	1.0 km	MPC · JPL
262419 Suzaka	2006 UK_{63}	Suzaka	October 20, 2006	Mount Nyukasa	Japan Aerospace Exploration Agency	·	2.5 km	MPC · JPL
262420	2006 US_{68}	—	October 16, 2006	Catalina	CSS	·	2.3 km	MPC · JPL
262421	2006 UP_{69}	—	October 16, 2006	Catalina	CSS	·	1.6 km	MPC · JPL
262422	2006 UN_{70}	—	October 16, 2006	Catalina	CSS	V	880 m	MPC · JPL
262423	2006 UR_{70}	—	October 16, 2006	Catalina	CSS	·	2.0 km	MPC · JPL
262424	2006 UK_{71}	—	October 16, 2006	Kitt Peak	Spacewatch	·	1.2 km	MPC · JPL
262425	2006 UU_{72}	—	October 17, 2006	Kitt Peak	Spacewatch	·	2.2 km	MPC · JPL
262426	2006 UT_{75}	—	October 17, 2006	Mount Lemmon	Mount Lemmon Survey	·	2.5 km	MPC · JPL
262427	2006 UG_{76}	—	October 17, 2006	Mount Lemmon	Mount Lemmon Survey	·	1.2 km	MPC · JPL
262428	2006 UL_{76}	—	October 17, 2006	Mount Lemmon	Mount Lemmon Survey	·	1.4 km	MPC · JPL
262429	2006 UV_{79}	—	October 17, 2006	Mount Lemmon	Mount Lemmon Survey	·	2.4 km	MPC · JPL
262430	2006 UK_{80}	—	October 17, 2006	Mount Lemmon	Mount Lemmon Survey	·	1.3 km	MPC · JPL
262431	2006 UU_{81}	—	October 17, 2006	Mount Lemmon	Mount Lemmon Survey	·	2.1 km	MPC · JPL
262432	2006 UZ_{81}	—	October 17, 2006	Kitt Peak	Spacewatch	·	2.1 km	MPC · JPL
262433	2006 UD_{83}	—	October 17, 2006	Mount Lemmon	Mount Lemmon Survey	·	1.5 km	MPC · JPL
262434	2006 UQ_{83}	—	October 17, 2006	Catalina	CSS	MAR	1.1 km	MPC · JPL
262435	2006 UW_{86}	—	October 17, 2006	Mount Lemmon	Mount Lemmon Survey	MAS	820 m	MPC · JPL
262436	2006 UG_{88}	—	October 17, 2006	Kitt Peak	Spacewatch	EUP	4.8 km	MPC · JPL
262437	2006 UD_{89}	—	October 17, 2006	Kitt Peak	Spacewatch	·	1.4 km	MPC · JPL
262438	2006 UK_{89}	—	October 17, 2006	Mount Lemmon	Mount Lemmon Survey	JUN	1.6 km	MPC · JPL
262439	2006 UA_{90}	—	October 17, 2006	Kitt Peak	Spacewatch	EOS	2.5 km	MPC · JPL
262440	2006 US_{90}	—	October 17, 2006	Kitt Peak	Spacewatch	·	1.2 km	MPC · JPL
262441	2006 UB_{91}	—	October 17, 2006	Kitt Peak	Spacewatch	·	2.8 km	MPC · JPL
262442	2006 UD_{92}	—	October 18, 2006	Kitt Peak	Spacewatch	·	1.9 km	MPC · JPL
262443	2006 UM_{95}	—	October 18, 2006	Kitt Peak	Spacewatch	·	1.5 km	MPC · JPL
262444	2006 UP_{97}	—	October 18, 2006	Kitt Peak	Spacewatch	MAS	960 m	MPC · JPL
262445	2006 UW_{100}	—	October 18, 2006	Kitt Peak	Spacewatch	·	990 m	MPC · JPL
262446	2006 UP_{106}	—	October 18, 2006	Kitt Peak	Spacewatch	·	770 m	MPC · JPL
262447	2006 UF_{107}	—	October 18, 2006	Kitt Peak	Spacewatch	·	2.6 km	MPC · JPL
262448	2006 UT_{107}	—	October 18, 2006	Kitt Peak	Spacewatch	·	1.6 km	MPC · JPL
262449	2006 UE_{108}	—	October 18, 2006	Kitt Peak	Spacewatch	MAR	1.1 km	MPC · JPL
262450	2006 UJ_{108}	—	October 18, 2006	Kitt Peak	Spacewatch	·	5.5 km	MPC · JPL
262451	2006 UC_{109}	—	October 18, 2006	Kitt Peak	Spacewatch	·	2.4 km	MPC · JPL
262452	2006 UG_{110}	—	October 19, 2006	Kitt Peak	Spacewatch	·	1.5 km	MPC · JPL
262453	2006 UE_{113}	—	October 19, 2006	Kitt Peak	Spacewatch	NYS	1.3 km	MPC · JPL
262454	2006 UE_{118}	—	October 19, 2006	Kitt Peak	Spacewatch	·	2.1 km	MPC · JPL
262455	2006 UB_{123}	—	October 19, 2006	Kitt Peak	Spacewatch	MAS	700 m	MPC · JPL
262456	2006 UQ_{124}	—	October 19, 2006	Mount Lemmon	Mount Lemmon Survey	·	1.4 km	MPC · JPL
262457	2006 UB_{126}	—	October 19, 2006	Kitt Peak	Spacewatch	AGN	1.2 km	MPC · JPL
262458	2006 UP_{126}	—	October 19, 2006	Kitt Peak	Spacewatch	(13314)	3.0 km	MPC · JPL
262459	2006 UG_{128}	—	October 19, 2006	Kitt Peak	Spacewatch	·	1.3 km	MPC · JPL
262460	2006 UX_{128}	—	October 19, 2006	Kitt Peak	Spacewatch	·	2.1 km	MPC · JPL
262461	2006 UP_{129}	—	October 19, 2006	Kitt Peak	Spacewatch	·	1.7 km	MPC · JPL
262462	2006 UF_{138}	—	October 19, 2006	Kitt Peak	Spacewatch	·	1.9 km	MPC · JPL
262463	2006 UU_{139}	—	October 19, 2006	Mount Lemmon	Mount Lemmon Survey	AGN	1.3 km	MPC · JPL
262464	2006 UF_{141}	—	October 19, 2006	Mount Lemmon	Mount Lemmon Survey	·	2.5 km	MPC · JPL
262465	2006 UR_{145}	—	October 20, 2006	Kitt Peak	Spacewatch	·	1.5 km	MPC · JPL
262466	2006 UL_{146}	—	October 20, 2006	Kitt Peak	Spacewatch	·	1 km	MPC · JPL
262467	2006 UR_{149}	—	October 20, 2006	Mount Lemmon	Mount Lemmon Survey	(5)	1.9 km	MPC · JPL
262468	2006 UO_{151}	—	October 20, 2006	Catalina	CSS	BRG	1.6 km	MPC · JPL
262469	2006 UT_{152}	—	October 21, 2006	Kitt Peak	Spacewatch	MAR	1.4 km	MPC · JPL
262470	2006 UQ_{153}	—	October 21, 2006	Kitt Peak	Spacewatch	·	790 m	MPC · JPL
262471	2006 UC_{158}	—	October 21, 2006	Mount Lemmon	Mount Lemmon Survey	·	1.4 km	MPC · JPL
262472	2006 UG_{158}	—	October 21, 2006	Mount Lemmon	Mount Lemmon Survey	·	1.4 km	MPC · JPL
262473	2006 UH_{167}	—	October 21, 2006	Mount Lemmon	Mount Lemmon Survey	·	860 m	MPC · JPL
262474	2006 UM_{173}	—	October 22, 2006	Mount Lemmon	Mount Lemmon Survey	·	1.9 km	MPC · JPL
262475	2006 UJ_{175}	—	October 16, 2006	Catalina	CSS	·	1.7 km	MPC · JPL
262476	2006 UM_{175}	—	October 16, 2006	Catalina	CSS	·	950 m	MPC · JPL
262477	2006 UQ_{181}	—	October 16, 2006	Catalina	CSS	·	2.2 km	MPC · JPL
262478	2006 UP_{182}	—	October 16, 2006	Catalina	CSS	·	1.2 km	MPC · JPL
262479	2006 UQ_{182}	—	October 16, 2006	Catalina	CSS	·	1.4 km	MPC · JPL
262480	2006 UV_{192}	—	October 19, 2006	Mount Lemmon	Mount Lemmon Survey	·	1.7 km	MPC · JPL
262481	2006 UD_{194}	—	October 20, 2006	Kitt Peak	Spacewatch	·	2.0 km	MPC · JPL
262482	2006 UN_{195}	—	October 20, 2006	Kitt Peak	Spacewatch	·	2.2 km	MPC · JPL
262483	2006 UG_{196}	—	October 20, 2006	Kitt Peak	Spacewatch	·	1.3 km	MPC · JPL
262484	2006 UV_{196}	—	October 20, 2006	Mount Lemmon	Mount Lemmon Survey	V	970 m	MPC · JPL
262485	2006 UZ_{196}	—	October 20, 2006	Kitt Peak	Spacewatch	·	2.6 km	MPC · JPL
262486	2006 UJ_{200}	—	October 21, 2006	Kitt Peak	Spacewatch	·	1.4 km	MPC · JPL
262487	2006 US_{200}	—	October 21, 2006	Kitt Peak	Spacewatch	(5)	1.3 km	MPC · JPL
262488	2006 UP_{202}	—	October 22, 2006	Catalina	CSS	MRX	1.4 km	MPC · JPL
262489	2006 US_{203}	—	October 22, 2006	Palomar	NEAT	·	2.6 km	MPC · JPL
262490	2006 UT_{207}	—	October 23, 2006	Kitt Peak	Spacewatch	KOR	1.2 km	MPC · JPL
262491	2006 UV_{210}	—	October 23, 2006	Kitt Peak	Spacewatch	·	1.2 km	MPC · JPL
262492	2006 UA_{212}	—	October 23, 2006	Kitt Peak	Spacewatch	·	1.9 km	MPC · JPL
262493	2006 UY_{212}	—	October 23, 2006	Kitt Peak	Spacewatch	·	1.5 km	MPC · JPL
262494	2006 UQ_{218}	—	October 16, 2006	Catalina	CSS	·	2.2 km	MPC · JPL
262495	2006 UK_{226}	—	October 20, 2006	Kitt Peak	Spacewatch	·	1.7 km	MPC · JPL
262496	2006 US_{226}	—	October 20, 2006	Kitt Peak	Spacewatch	NYS	1.3 km	MPC · JPL
262497	2006 UA_{227}	—	October 20, 2006	Palomar	NEAT	·	1.6 km	MPC · JPL
262498	2006 UM_{232}	—	October 21, 2006	Mount Lemmon	Mount Lemmon Survey	·	3.8 km	MPC · JPL
262499	2006 UF_{236}	—	October 23, 2006	Kitt Peak	Spacewatch	·	900 m	MPC · JPL
262500	2006 UF_{240}	—	October 23, 2006	Kitt Peak	Spacewatch	·	1.3 km	MPC · JPL

== 262501–262600 ==
back to top

Designation			Discovery			Properties		Ref
Permanent	Provisional	Named after	Date	Site	Discoverer(s)	Category	Diam.	Ref
262501	2006 UB_{241}	—	October 23, 2006	Mount Lemmon	Mount Lemmon Survey	V	980 m	MPC · JPL
262502	2006 UM_{255}	—	October 27, 2006	Mount Lemmon	Mount Lemmon Survey	·	1.8 km	MPC · JPL
262503	2006 UR_{256}	—	October 28, 2006	Kitt Peak	Spacewatch	KOR	1.3 km	MPC · JPL
262504	2006 UN_{257}	—	October 28, 2006	Mount Lemmon	Mount Lemmon Survey	V	670 m	MPC · JPL
262505	2006 UY_{257}	—	October 28, 2006	Mount Lemmon	Mount Lemmon Survey	·	2.8 km	MPC · JPL
262506	2006 UF_{259}	—	October 28, 2006	Mount Lemmon	Mount Lemmon Survey	MAS	640 m	MPC · JPL
262507	2006 UU_{263}	—	October 27, 2006	Kitt Peak	Spacewatch	·	1.2 km	MPC · JPL
262508	2006 UQ_{264}	—	October 27, 2006	Kitt Peak	Spacewatch	·	1.6 km	MPC · JPL
262509	2006 UR_{264}	—	October 27, 2006	Mount Lemmon	Mount Lemmon Survey	·	1.8 km	MPC · JPL
262510	2006 UD_{267}	—	October 27, 2006	Catalina	CSS	·	2.7 km	MPC · JPL
262511	2006 UZ_{268}	—	October 27, 2006	Mount Lemmon	Mount Lemmon Survey	MAS	1.1 km	MPC · JPL
262512	2006 UP_{269}	—	October 27, 2006	Kitt Peak	Spacewatch	·	1.8 km	MPC · JPL
262513	2006 UJ_{271}	—	October 27, 2006	Kitt Peak	Spacewatch	·	2.5 km	MPC · JPL
262514	2006 US_{272}	—	October 27, 2006	Kitt Peak	Spacewatch	·	1.9 km	MPC · JPL
262515	2006 UG_{276}	—	October 28, 2006	Mount Lemmon	Mount Lemmon Survey	·	1.2 km	MPC · JPL
262516	2006 UR_{277}	—	October 28, 2006	Kitt Peak	Spacewatch	·	890 m	MPC · JPL
262517	2006 UH_{279}	—	October 28, 2006	Mount Lemmon	Mount Lemmon Survey	KOR	1.3 km	MPC · JPL
262518	2006 UN_{279}	—	October 28, 2006	Mount Lemmon	Mount Lemmon Survey	·	1.5 km	MPC · JPL
262519	2006 UN_{281}	—	October 28, 2006	Mount Lemmon	Mount Lemmon Survey	·	3.0 km	MPC · JPL
262520	2006 UR_{281}	—	October 28, 2006	Mount Lemmon	Mount Lemmon Survey	·	1.0 km	MPC · JPL
262521	2006 UD_{284}	—	October 28, 2006	Kitt Peak	Spacewatch	(2076)	1.3 km	MPC · JPL
262522	2006 UJ_{284}	—	October 28, 2006	Kitt Peak	Spacewatch	·	1.3 km	MPC · JPL
262523	2006 UJ_{289}	—	October 31, 2006	Kitt Peak	Spacewatch	·	1.7 km	MPC · JPL
262524	2006 UU_{290}	—	October 19, 2006	Kitt Peak	Spacewatch	·	1.8 km	MPC · JPL
262525	2006 UV_{312}	—	October 19, 2006	Kitt Peak	M. W. Buie	·	1.7 km	MPC · JPL
262526	2006 UD_{321}	—	October 19, 2006	Kitt Peak	M. W. Buie	·	1.8 km	MPC · JPL
262527	2006 UN_{327}	—	October 31, 2006	Mount Lemmon	Mount Lemmon Survey	·	2.6 km	MPC · JPL
262528	2006 UK_{328}	—	October 17, 2006	Mount Lemmon	Mount Lemmon Survey	·	1.0 km	MPC · JPL
262529	2006 UJ_{329}	—	October 23, 2006	Palomar	NEAT	·	2.9 km	MPC · JPL
262530	2006 UT_{329}	—	October 29, 2006	Catalina	CSS	EOS	4.4 km	MPC · JPL
262531	2006 UV_{329}	—	October 30, 2006	Catalina	CSS	PHO	1.7 km	MPC · JPL
262532	2006 UK_{331}	—	October 17, 2006	Mount Lemmon	Mount Lemmon Survey	(12739)	1.7 km	MPC · JPL
262533	2006 UC_{338}	—	October 23, 2006	Mount Lemmon	Mount Lemmon Survey	·	1.4 km	MPC · JPL
262534	2006 UF_{338}	—	October 27, 2006	Mount Lemmon	Mount Lemmon Survey	·	1.5 km	MPC · JPL
262535	2006 UK_{340}	—	October 19, 2006	Mount Lemmon	Mount Lemmon Survey	·	1.9 km	MPC · JPL
262536 Nowikow	2006 UJ_{349}	Nowikow	October 26, 2006	Mauna Kea	P. A. Wiegert, Papadimos, A.	·	1.3 km	MPC · JPL
262537	2006 UG_{357}	—	October 21, 2006	Kitt Peak	Spacewatch	·	2.0 km	MPC · JPL
262538	2006 VF	—	November 1, 2006	7300	W. K. Y. Yeung	·	1.5 km	MPC · JPL
262539	2006 VA_{4}	—	November 9, 2006	Kitt Peak	Spacewatch	·	3.0 km	MPC · JPL
262540	2006 VF_{6}	—	November 10, 2006	Kitt Peak	Spacewatch	·	1.4 km	MPC · JPL
262541	2006 VR_{6}	—	November 10, 2006	Kitt Peak	Spacewatch	·	990 m	MPC · JPL
262542	2006 VU_{6}	—	November 10, 2006	Kitt Peak	Spacewatch	NYS	1.2 km	MPC · JPL
262543	2006 VJ_{8}	—	November 11, 2006	Kitt Peak	Spacewatch	MAS	950 m	MPC · JPL
262544	2006 VS_{8}	—	November 11, 2006	Kitt Peak	Spacewatch	·	1.4 km	MPC · JPL
262545	2006 VU_{8}	—	November 11, 2006	Kitt Peak	Spacewatch	·	2.2 km	MPC · JPL
262546	2006 VN_{9}	—	November 11, 2006	Catalina	CSS	·	1.7 km	MPC · JPL
262547	2006 VP_{9}	—	November 11, 2006	Catalina	CSS	MAS	630 m	MPC · JPL
262548	2006 VR_{9}	—	November 11, 2006	Mount Lemmon	Mount Lemmon Survey	·	1.1 km	MPC · JPL
262549	2006 VW_{14}	—	November 9, 2006	Kitt Peak	Spacewatch	AGN	1.4 km	MPC · JPL
262550	2006 VF_{16}	—	November 9, 2006	Kitt Peak	Spacewatch	·	1.9 km	MPC · JPL
262551	2006 VZ_{17}	—	November 9, 2006	Kitt Peak	Spacewatch	·	980 m	MPC · JPL
262552	2006 VB_{18}	—	November 9, 2006	Kitt Peak	Spacewatch	·	2.5 km	MPC · JPL
262553	2006 VQ_{19}	—	November 9, 2006	Kitt Peak	Spacewatch	·	1.6 km	MPC · JPL
262554	2006 VR_{22}	—	November 10, 2006	Kitt Peak	Spacewatch	MAS	980 m	MPC · JPL
262555	2006 VL_{23}	—	November 10, 2006	Kitt Peak	Spacewatch	KOR	1.5 km	MPC · JPL
262556	2006 VL_{24}	—	November 10, 2006	Kitt Peak	Spacewatch	·	1.6 km	MPC · JPL
262557	2006 VT_{25}	—	November 10, 2006	Kitt Peak	Spacewatch	·	1.8 km	MPC · JPL
262558	2006 VP_{26}	—	November 10, 2006	Kitt Peak	Spacewatch	EUN	1.6 km	MPC · JPL
262559	2006 VZ_{26}	—	November 10, 2006	Kitt Peak	Spacewatch	·	1.4 km	MPC · JPL
262560	2006 VC_{27}	—	November 10, 2006	Kitt Peak	Spacewatch	V	730 m	MPC · JPL
262561	2006 VL_{28}	—	November 10, 2006	Kitt Peak	Spacewatch	·	1.6 km	MPC · JPL
262562	2006 VN_{28}	—	November 10, 2006	Kitt Peak	Spacewatch	·	3.2 km	MPC · JPL
262563	2006 VE_{29}	—	November 10, 2006	Kitt Peak	Spacewatch	V	840 m	MPC · JPL
262564	2006 VG_{30}	—	November 10, 2006	Kitt Peak	Spacewatch	·	5.1 km	MPC · JPL
262565	2006 VH_{30}	—	November 10, 2006	Kitt Peak	Spacewatch	·	4.1 km	MPC · JPL
262566	2006 VE_{31}	—	November 10, 2006	Kitt Peak	Spacewatch	NYS	1.6 km	MPC · JPL
262567	2006 VT_{33}	—	November 11, 2006	Mount Lemmon	Mount Lemmon Survey	NYS	1.8 km	MPC · JPL
262568	2006 VS_{35}	—	November 11, 2006	Mount Lemmon	Mount Lemmon Survey	·	1.5 km	MPC · JPL
262569	2006 VW_{41}	—	November 12, 2006	Mount Lemmon	Mount Lemmon Survey	·	1.6 km	MPC · JPL
262570	2006 VJ_{43}	—	November 13, 2006	Kitt Peak	Spacewatch	·	1.3 km	MPC · JPL
262571	2006 VK_{43}	—	November 13, 2006	Kitt Peak	Spacewatch	·	2.4 km	MPC · JPL
262572	2006 VH_{49}	—	November 10, 2006	Kitt Peak	Spacewatch	·	1.9 km	MPC · JPL
262573	2006 VZ_{57}	—	November 11, 2006	Kitt Peak	Spacewatch	AGN	1.4 km	MPC · JPL
262574	2006 VH_{60}	—	November 11, 2006	Kitt Peak	Spacewatch	·	1.3 km	MPC · JPL
262575	2006 VS_{63}	—	November 11, 2006	Kitt Peak	Spacewatch	EOS	2.4 km	MPC · JPL
262576	2006 VQ_{64}	—	November 11, 2006	Kitt Peak	Spacewatch	MAS	1.0 km	MPC · JPL
262577	2006 VQ_{67}	—	November 11, 2006	Kitt Peak	Spacewatch	KOR	1.7 km	MPC · JPL
262578	2006 VW_{67}	—	November 11, 2006	Kitt Peak	Spacewatch	·	1.6 km	MPC · JPL
262579	2006 VH_{68}	—	November 11, 2006	Kitt Peak	Spacewatch	·	2.5 km	MPC · JPL
262580	2006 VQ_{71}	—	November 11, 2006	Mount Lemmon	Mount Lemmon Survey	·	1.6 km	MPC · JPL
262581	2006 VU_{73}	—	November 11, 2006	Kitt Peak	Spacewatch	·	1.4 km	MPC · JPL
262582	2006 VB_{74}	—	November 11, 2006	Mount Lemmon	Mount Lemmon Survey	·	2.5 km	MPC · JPL
262583	2006 VQ_{78}	—	November 12, 2006	Mount Lemmon	Mount Lemmon Survey	·	1.3 km	MPC · JPL
262584	2006 VP_{81}	—	November 12, 2006	Lulin	Lin, H.-C., Q. Ye	·	4.7 km	MPC · JPL
262585	2006 VA_{83}	—	November 13, 2006	Kitt Peak	Spacewatch	·	1.2 km	MPC · JPL
262586	2006 VJ_{86}	—	November 14, 2006	Socorro	LINEAR	·	1.8 km	MPC · JPL
262587	2006 VD_{95}	—	November 15, 2006	Ottmarsheim	C. Rinner	·	1.6 km	MPC · JPL
262588	2006 VZ_{95}	—	November 10, 2006	Kitt Peak	Spacewatch	·	2.4 km	MPC · JPL
262589	2006 VL_{96}	—	November 10, 2006	Kitt Peak	Spacewatch	(5)	1.5 km	MPC · JPL
262590	2006 VH_{98}	—	November 11, 2006	Kitt Peak	Spacewatch	EUP · slow	5.5 km	MPC · JPL
262591	2006 VX_{100}	—	November 11, 2006	Catalina	CSS	·	1.4 km	MPC · JPL
262592	2006 VY_{100}	—	November 11, 2006	Catalina	CSS	(5)	1.3 km	MPC · JPL
262593	2006 VK_{102}	—	November 12, 2006	Mount Lemmon	Mount Lemmon Survey	NYS	1.3 km	MPC · JPL
262594	2006 VP_{104}	—	November 13, 2006	Catalina	CSS	·	3.0 km	MPC · JPL
262595	2006 VK_{111}	—	November 13, 2006	Kitt Peak	Spacewatch	·	2.5 km	MPC · JPL
262596	2006 VL_{114}	—	November 14, 2006	Mount Lemmon	Mount Lemmon Survey	·	1.7 km	MPC · JPL
262597	2006 VF_{116}	—	November 14, 2006	Catalina	CSS	·	2.6 km	MPC · JPL
262598	2006 VH_{116}	—	November 14, 2006	Socorro	LINEAR	·	1.7 km	MPC · JPL
262599	2006 VC_{118}	—	November 14, 2006	Kitt Peak	Spacewatch	HOF	3.2 km	MPC · JPL
262600	2006 VV_{120}	—	November 14, 2006	Kitt Peak	Spacewatch	·	1.6 km	MPC · JPL

== 262601–262700 ==
back to top

Designation			Discovery			Properties		Ref
Permanent	Provisional	Named after	Date	Site	Discoverer(s)	Category	Diam.	Ref
262601	2006 VZ_{120}	—	November 14, 2006	Kitt Peak	Spacewatch	·	1.6 km	MPC · JPL
262602	2006 VH_{121}	—	November 14, 2006	Catalina	CSS	V	800 m	MPC · JPL
262603	2006 VU_{122}	—	November 14, 2006	Kitt Peak	Spacewatch	·	2.1 km	MPC · JPL
262604	2006 VP_{123}	—	November 14, 2006	Kitt Peak	Spacewatch	·	2.2 km	MPC · JPL
262605	2006 VP_{133}	—	November 15, 2006	Socorro	LINEAR	·	2.2 km	MPC · JPL
262606	2006 VF_{134}	—	November 15, 2006	Mount Lemmon	Mount Lemmon Survey	MAS	760 m	MPC · JPL
262607	2006 VC_{137}	—	November 15, 2006	Kitt Peak	Spacewatch	NYS	1.3 km	MPC · JPL
262608	2006 VZ_{140}	—	November 15, 2006	Kitt Peak	Spacewatch	KOR	1.5 km	MPC · JPL
262609	2006 VD_{141}	—	November 13, 2006	La Sagra	OAM	·	2.4 km	MPC · JPL
262610	2006 VU_{144}	—	November 15, 2006	Catalina	CSS	·	3.0 km	MPC · JPL
262611	2006 VX_{147}	—	November 15, 2006	Catalina	CSS	·	2.6 km	MPC · JPL
262612	2006 VH_{148}	—	November 15, 2006	Mount Lemmon	Mount Lemmon Survey	·	1.9 km	MPC · JPL
262613	2006 VW_{149}	—	November 9, 2006	Palomar	NEAT	·	2.4 km	MPC · JPL
262614	2006 VD_{150}	—	November 9, 2006	Palomar	NEAT	MAS	750 m	MPC · JPL
262615	2006 VE_{151}	—	November 9, 2006	Palomar	NEAT	MAS	810 m	MPC · JPL
262616	2006 VR_{151}	—	November 9, 2006	Palomar	NEAT	HNS	1.7 km	MPC · JPL
262617	2006 VT_{153}	—	November 8, 2006	Palomar	NEAT	·	1.9 km	MPC · JPL
262618	2006 VO_{171}	—	November 1, 2006	Kitt Peak	Spacewatch	·	1.0 km	MPC · JPL
262619	2006 VN_{172}	—	November 13, 2006	Mount Lemmon	Mount Lemmon Survey	CLA	1.8 km	MPC · JPL
262620	2006 WA_{2}	—	November 18, 2006	7300	W. K. Y. Yeung	·	1.6 km	MPC · JPL
262621	2006 WG_{2}	—	November 16, 2006	Needville	J. Dellinger	·	1.4 km	MPC · JPL
262622	2006 WU_{2}	—	November 20, 2006	7300	W. K. Y. Yeung	·	2.4 km	MPC · JPL
262623	2006 WY_{2}	—	November 17, 2006	Siding Spring	SSS	ATE	760 m	MPC · JPL
262624	2006 WN_{4}	—	November 19, 2006	Socorro	LINEAR	·	1.8 km	MPC · JPL
262625	2006 WR_{8}	—	November 16, 2006	Kitt Peak	Spacewatch	HOF	3.2 km	MPC · JPL
262626	2006 WO_{14}	—	November 16, 2006	Mount Lemmon	Mount Lemmon Survey	EUN	1.6 km	MPC · JPL
262627	2006 WF_{16}	—	November 17, 2006	Kitt Peak	Spacewatch	·	2.1 km	MPC · JPL
262628	2006 WE_{21}	—	November 17, 2006	Mount Lemmon	Mount Lemmon Survey	·	1.4 km	MPC · JPL
262629	2006 WT_{22}	—	November 17, 2006	Mount Lemmon	Mount Lemmon Survey	·	1.8 km	MPC · JPL
262630	2006 WX_{27}	—	November 22, 2006	7300	W. K. Y. Yeung	·	1.3 km	MPC · JPL
262631	2006 WM_{32}	—	November 16, 2006	Kitt Peak	Spacewatch	·	1.7 km	MPC · JPL
262632	2006 WN_{33}	—	November 16, 2006	Kitt Peak	Spacewatch	·	2.0 km	MPC · JPL
262633	2006 WU_{33}	—	November 16, 2006	Kitt Peak	Spacewatch	·	1.6 km	MPC · JPL
262634	2006 WF_{39}	—	November 16, 2006	Kitt Peak	Spacewatch	·	4.3 km	MPC · JPL
262635	2006 WG_{39}	—	November 16, 2006	Kitt Peak	Spacewatch	NEM	2.9 km	MPC · JPL
262636	2006 WT_{40}	—	November 16, 2006	Kitt Peak	Spacewatch	EOS	2.2 km	MPC · JPL
262637	2006 WT_{41}	—	November 16, 2006	Mount Lemmon	Mount Lemmon Survey	JUN	1.2 km	MPC · JPL
262638	2006 WY_{41}	—	November 16, 2006	Mount Lemmon	Mount Lemmon Survey	·	2.0 km	MPC · JPL
262639	2006 WA_{45}	—	November 16, 2006	Catalina	CSS	·	2.9 km	MPC · JPL
262640	2006 WG_{48}	—	November 16, 2006	Kitt Peak	Spacewatch	·	2.7 km	MPC · JPL
262641	2006 WE_{49}	—	November 16, 2006	Mount Lemmon	Mount Lemmon Survey	·	2.8 km	MPC · JPL
262642	2006 WT_{49}	—	November 16, 2006	Kitt Peak	Spacewatch	SUL	2.5 km	MPC · JPL
262643	2006 WS_{50}	—	November 16, 2006	Kitt Peak	Spacewatch	·	1.8 km	MPC · JPL
262644	2006 WK_{51}	—	November 16, 2006	Mount Lemmon	Mount Lemmon Survey	·	2.4 km	MPC · JPL
262645	2006 WC_{52}	—	November 16, 2006	Kitt Peak	Spacewatch	(5)	1.5 km	MPC · JPL
262646	2006 WS_{53}	—	November 16, 2006	Kitt Peak	Spacewatch	·	1.5 km	MPC · JPL
262647	2006 WJ_{55}	—	November 16, 2006	Kitt Peak	Spacewatch	·	1.8 km	MPC · JPL
262648	2006 WE_{57}	—	November 16, 2006	Kitt Peak	Spacewatch	·	2.8 km	MPC · JPL
262649	2006 WY_{60}	—	November 17, 2006	Mount Lemmon	Mount Lemmon Survey	·	1.5 km	MPC · JPL
262650	2006 WN_{61}	—	November 17, 2006	Catalina	CSS	·	1.9 km	MPC · JPL
262651	2006 WL_{63}	—	November 17, 2006	Mount Lemmon	Mount Lemmon Survey	·	1.4 km	MPC · JPL
262652	2006 WG_{69}	—	November 17, 2006	Mount Lemmon	Mount Lemmon Survey	·	1.5 km	MPC · JPL
262653	2006 WM_{70}	—	November 18, 2006	Kitt Peak	Spacewatch	AGN	1.3 km	MPC · JPL
262654	2006 WT_{86}	—	November 18, 2006	Socorro	LINEAR	·	1.5 km	MPC · JPL
262655	2006 WL_{90}	—	November 18, 2006	Mount Lemmon	Mount Lemmon Survey	·	5.6 km	MPC · JPL
262656	2006 WM_{90}	—	November 18, 2006	Mount Lemmon	Mount Lemmon Survey	·	1.8 km	MPC · JPL
262657	2006 WO_{95}	—	November 19, 2006	Kitt Peak	Spacewatch	JUN	1.5 km	MPC · JPL
262658	2006 WL_{102}	—	November 19, 2006	Kitt Peak	Spacewatch	·	1.7 km	MPC · JPL
262659	2006 WB_{105}	—	November 19, 2006	Kitt Peak	Spacewatch	·	2.1 km	MPC · JPL
262660	2006 WH_{105}	—	November 19, 2006	Kitt Peak	Spacewatch	·	1.8 km	MPC · JPL
262661	2006 WJ_{105}	—	November 19, 2006	Kitt Peak	Spacewatch	·	4.6 km	MPC · JPL
262662	2006 WT_{108}	—	November 19, 2006	Kitt Peak	Spacewatch	·	1.6 km	MPC · JPL
262663	2006 WG_{109}	—	November 19, 2006	Kitt Peak	Spacewatch	(5)	1.2 km	MPC · JPL
262664	2006 WJ_{109}	—	November 19, 2006	Kitt Peak	Spacewatch	·	2.5 km	MPC · JPL
262665	2006 WK_{109}	—	November 19, 2006	Kitt Peak	Spacewatch	·	1.8 km	MPC · JPL
262666	2006 WA_{111}	—	November 19, 2006	Kitt Peak	Spacewatch	·	1.7 km	MPC · JPL
262667	2006 WB_{119}	—	November 21, 2006	Mount Lemmon	Mount Lemmon Survey	·	890 m	MPC · JPL
262668	2006 WX_{120}	—	November 21, 2006	Socorro	LINEAR	·	2.1 km	MPC · JPL
262669	2006 WW_{122}	—	November 21, 2006	Mount Lemmon	Mount Lemmon Survey	·	5.1 km	MPC · JPL
262670	2006 WH_{128}	—	November 26, 2006	7300	W. K. Y. Yeung	·	1.6 km	MPC · JPL
262671	2006 WZ_{136}	—	November 19, 2006	Catalina	CSS	V	680 m	MPC · JPL
262672	2006 WD_{138}	—	November 19, 2006	Catalina	CSS	·	1.2 km	MPC · JPL
262673	2006 WH_{141}	—	November 20, 2006	Kitt Peak	Spacewatch	KOR	1.5 km	MPC · JPL
262674	2006 WP_{144}	—	November 20, 2006	Kitt Peak	Spacewatch	·	2.8 km	MPC · JPL
262675	2006 WV_{146}	—	November 20, 2006	Kitt Peak	Spacewatch	EOS	2.8 km	MPC · JPL
262676	2006 WS_{147}	—	November 20, 2006	Socorro	LINEAR	·	4.0 km	MPC · JPL
262677	2006 WO_{150}	—	November 20, 2006	Kitt Peak	Spacewatch	GEF	1.4 km	MPC · JPL
262678	2006 WR_{153}	—	November 21, 2006	Mount Lemmon	Mount Lemmon Survey	(5)	1.4 km	MPC · JPL
262679	2006 WD_{158}	—	November 22, 2006	Socorro	LINEAR	·	1.6 km	MPC · JPL
262680	2006 WL_{159}	—	November 22, 2006	Mount Lemmon	Mount Lemmon Survey	·	2.4 km	MPC · JPL
262681	2006 WU_{159}	—	November 22, 2006	Kitt Peak	Spacewatch	·	3.9 km	MPC · JPL
262682	2006 WE_{160}	—	November 22, 2006	Mount Lemmon	Mount Lemmon Survey	·	6.4 km	MPC · JPL
262683	2006 WQ_{165}	—	November 23, 2006	Kitt Peak	Spacewatch	·	4.5 km	MPC · JPL
262684	2006 WN_{166}	—	November 23, 2006	Kitt Peak	Spacewatch	·	1.6 km	MPC · JPL
262685	2006 WF_{169}	—	November 23, 2006	Kitt Peak	Spacewatch	·	1.4 km	MPC · JPL
262686	2006 WD_{170}	—	November 23, 2006	Kitt Peak	Spacewatch	·	2.3 km	MPC · JPL
262687	2006 WA_{173}	—	November 23, 2006	Kitt Peak	Spacewatch	ADE	2.2 km	MPC · JPL
262688	2006 WA_{177}	—	November 23, 2006	Mount Lemmon	Mount Lemmon Survey	·	2.3 km	MPC · JPL
262689	2006 WX_{179}	—	November 24, 2006	Mount Lemmon	Mount Lemmon Survey	·	1.5 km	MPC · JPL
262690	2006 WE_{185}	—	November 27, 2006	Marly	Observatoire Naef	·	5.7 km	MPC · JPL
262691	2006 WA_{186}	—	November 17, 2006	Palomar	NEAT	·	2.6 km	MPC · JPL
262692	2006 WQ_{189}	—	November 25, 2006	Mount Lemmon	Mount Lemmon Survey	·	1.8 km	MPC · JPL
262693	2006 WZ_{191}	—	November 27, 2006	Kitt Peak	Spacewatch	·	2.1 km	MPC · JPL
262694	2006 WN_{192}	—	November 27, 2006	Kitt Peak	Spacewatch	·	1.2 km	MPC · JPL
262695	2006 WP_{192}	—	November 27, 2006	Kitt Peak	Spacewatch	·	1.8 km	MPC · JPL
262696	2006 WL_{194}	—	November 27, 2006	Kitt Peak	Spacewatch	·	1.6 km	MPC · JPL
262697	2006 WS_{194}	—	November 28, 2006	Kitt Peak	Spacewatch	·	2.0 km	MPC · JPL
262698	2006 WY_{194}	—	November 29, 2006	Socorro	LINEAR	MRX	1.2 km	MPC · JPL
262699	2006 WP_{198}	—	November 18, 2006	Kitt Peak	Spacewatch	·	1.9 km	MPC · JPL
262700	2006 WX_{202}	—	November 27, 2006	Mount Lemmon	Mount Lemmon Survey	HOF	3.3 km	MPC · JPL

== 262701–262800 ==
back to top

Designation			Discovery			Properties		Ref
Permanent	Provisional	Named after	Date	Site	Discoverer(s)	Category	Diam.	Ref
262701	2006 WZ_{202}	—	November 16, 2006	Kitt Peak	Spacewatch	(5)	1.6 km	MPC · JPL
262702	2006 XS	—	December 10, 2006	Pla D'Arguines	R. Ferrando	·	1.6 km	MPC · JPL
262703	2006 XL_{3}	—	December 12, 2006	Marly	P. Kocher	·	1.8 km	MPC · JPL
262704	2006 XG_{4}	—	December 14, 2006	Wildberg	R. Apitzsch	·	1.9 km	MPC · JPL
262705 Vosne-Romanée	2006 XH_{4}	Vosne-Romanée	December 14, 2006	Vicques	M. Ory	NYS	1.5 km	MPC · JPL
262706	2006 XS_{4}	—	December 13, 2006	7300	W. K. Y. Yeung	·	1.5 km	MPC · JPL
262707	2006 XE_{5}	—	December 1, 2006	Mount Lemmon	Mount Lemmon Survey	·	2.4 km	MPC · JPL
262708	2006 XO_{6}	—	December 9, 2006	Palomar	NEAT	PHO	1.3 km	MPC · JPL
262709	2006 XG_{7}	—	December 9, 2006	Kitt Peak	Spacewatch	·	1.5 km	MPC · JPL
262710	2006 XO_{7}	—	December 9, 2006	Kitt Peak	Spacewatch	·	3.1 km	MPC · JPL
262711	2006 XT_{7}	—	December 9, 2006	Palomar	NEAT	·	2.6 km	MPC · JPL
262712	2006 XH_{8}	—	December 9, 2006	Kitt Peak	Spacewatch	·	2.3 km	MPC · JPL
262713	2006 XD_{12}	—	December 10, 2006	Kitt Peak	Spacewatch	·	2.8 km	MPC · JPL
262714	2006 XQ_{14}	—	December 10, 2006	Kitt Peak	Spacewatch	NAE	3.4 km	MPC · JPL
262715	2006 XT_{17}	—	December 10, 2006	Kitt Peak	Spacewatch	·	1.7 km	MPC · JPL
262716	2006 XE_{18}	—	December 10, 2006	Kitt Peak	Spacewatch	EOS	2.5 km	MPC · JPL
262717	2006 XJ_{18}	—	December 10, 2006	Kitt Peak	Spacewatch	·	2.2 km	MPC · JPL
262718	2006 XS_{19}	—	December 11, 2006	Kitt Peak	Spacewatch	·	3.0 km	MPC · JPL
262719	2006 XE_{20}	—	December 11, 2006	Kitt Peak	Spacewatch	·	4.0 km	MPC · JPL
262720	2006 XV_{20}	—	December 11, 2006	Catalina	CSS	·	1.8 km	MPC · JPL
262721	2006 XA_{22}	—	December 12, 2006	Kitt Peak	Spacewatch	·	1.6 km	MPC · JPL
262722	2006 XL_{24}	—	December 12, 2006	Kitt Peak	Spacewatch	·	1.4 km	MPC · JPL
262723	2006 XM_{25}	—	December 12, 2006	Kitt Peak	Spacewatch	MRX	1.0 km	MPC · JPL
262724	2006 XQ_{28}	—	December 13, 2006	Catalina	CSS	MAS	910 m	MPC · JPL
262725	2006 XV_{28}	—	December 13, 2006	Socorro	LINEAR	·	1.9 km	MPC · JPL
262726	2006 XY_{28}	—	December 13, 2006	Mount Lemmon	Mount Lemmon Survey	HYG	5.3 km	MPC · JPL
262727	2006 XL_{32}	—	December 9, 2006	Kitt Peak	Spacewatch	·	2.5 km	MPC · JPL
262728	2006 XE_{33}	—	December 11, 2006	Kitt Peak	Spacewatch	(5)	1.4 km	MPC · JPL
262729	2006 XJ_{37}	—	December 11, 2006	Kitt Peak	Spacewatch	·	2.1 km	MPC · JPL
262730	2006 XV_{37}	—	December 11, 2006	Kitt Peak	Spacewatch	EOS	2.4 km	MPC · JPL
262731	2006 XX_{37}	—	December 11, 2006	Kitt Peak	Spacewatch	GEF	1.6 km	MPC · JPL
262732	2006 XP_{38}	—	December 11, 2006	Kitt Peak	Spacewatch	·	1.9 km	MPC · JPL
262733	2006 XA_{39}	—	December 11, 2006	Kitt Peak	Spacewatch	·	1.5 km	MPC · JPL
262734	2006 XN_{39}	—	December 12, 2006	Kitt Peak	Spacewatch	·	1.6 km	MPC · JPL
262735	2006 XW_{39}	—	December 12, 2006	Kitt Peak	Spacewatch	(5)	1.9 km	MPC · JPL
262736	2006 XA_{43}	—	December 12, 2006	Mount Lemmon	Mount Lemmon Survey	·	1.6 km	MPC · JPL
262737	2006 XE_{45}	—	December 13, 2006	Kitt Peak	Spacewatch	·	1.7 km	MPC · JPL
262738	2006 XN_{45}	—	December 13, 2006	Kitt Peak	Spacewatch	·	3.3 km	MPC · JPL
262739	2006 XU_{46}	—	December 13, 2006	Catalina	CSS	·	4.1 km	MPC · JPL
262740	2006 XH_{47}	—	December 13, 2006	Socorro	LINEAR	GEF	1.8 km	MPC · JPL
262741	2006 XA_{49}	—	December 13, 2006	Mount Lemmon	Mount Lemmon Survey	(18466)	3.4 km	MPC · JPL
262742	2006 XE_{49}	—	December 13, 2006	Mount Lemmon	Mount Lemmon Survey	AGN	1.4 km	MPC · JPL
262743	2006 XT_{49}	—	December 13, 2006	Mount Lemmon	Mount Lemmon Survey	NEM	2.4 km	MPC · JPL
262744	2006 XA_{50}	—	December 13, 2006	Mount Lemmon	Mount Lemmon Survey	·	2.9 km	MPC · JPL
262745	2006 XB_{51}	—	December 13, 2006	Mount Lemmon	Mount Lemmon Survey	·	2.3 km	MPC · JPL
262746	2006 XJ_{51}	—	December 13, 2006	Kitt Peak	Spacewatch	·	2.9 km	MPC · JPL
262747	2006 XN_{51}	—	December 14, 2006	Kitt Peak	Spacewatch	·	1.8 km	MPC · JPL
262748	2006 XZ_{53}	—	December 15, 2006	Socorro	LINEAR	PHO	2.1 km	MPC · JPL
262749	2006 XU_{55}	—	December 15, 2006	Mount Lemmon	Mount Lemmon Survey	EUN	1.2 km	MPC · JPL
262750	2006 XX_{55}	—	December 13, 2006	Mount Lemmon	Mount Lemmon Survey	·	3.2 km	MPC · JPL
262751	2006 XA_{56}	—	December 13, 2006	Mount Lemmon	Mount Lemmon Survey	·	2.3 km	MPC · JPL
262752	2006 XD_{57}	—	December 13, 2006	Mount Lemmon	Mount Lemmon Survey	·	1.6 km	MPC · JPL
262753	2006 XO_{57}	—	December 14, 2006	Mount Lemmon	Mount Lemmon Survey	·	2.5 km	MPC · JPL
262754	2006 XW_{57}	—	December 14, 2006	Socorro	LINEAR	EUN	1.7 km	MPC · JPL
262755	2006 XN_{58}	—	December 14, 2006	Kitt Peak	Spacewatch	(21344)	1.8 km	MPC · JPL
262756	2006 XE_{60}	—	December 14, 2006	Kitt Peak	Spacewatch	PAD	1.9 km	MPC · JPL
262757	2006 XN_{60}	—	December 14, 2006	Kitt Peak	Spacewatch	·	1.9 km	MPC · JPL
262758	2006 XZ_{60}	—	December 15, 2006	Socorro	LINEAR	·	4.7 km	MPC · JPL
262759	2006 XD_{61}	—	December 15, 2006	Mount Lemmon	Mount Lemmon Survey	MAS	1.0 km	MPC · JPL
262760	2006 XE_{62}	—	December 15, 2006	Kitt Peak	Spacewatch	·	3.7 km	MPC · JPL
262761	2006 XO_{64}	—	December 12, 2006	Palomar	NEAT	·	2.3 km	MPC · JPL
262762	2006 XP_{64}	—	December 12, 2006	Palomar	NEAT	·	1.1 km	MPC · JPL
262763	2006 XH_{66}	—	December 13, 2006	Catalina	CSS	BRG	2.0 km	MPC · JPL
262764	2006 XE_{69}	—	December 13, 2006	Kitt Peak	Spacewatch	HYG	3.0 km	MPC · JPL
262765	2006 XN_{69}	—	December 15, 2006	Kitt Peak	Spacewatch	TIR	4.1 km	MPC · JPL
262766	2006 XX_{69}	—	December 11, 2006	Kitt Peak	Spacewatch	·	1.6 km	MPC · JPL
262767	2006 XY_{72}	—	December 15, 2006	Kitt Peak	Spacewatch	(5)	1.7 km	MPC · JPL
262768	2006 YC_{1}	—	December 16, 2006	Kitt Peak	Spacewatch	·	1.9 km	MPC · JPL
262769	2006 YS_{4}	—	December 16, 2006	Mount Lemmon	Mount Lemmon Survey	(5)	1.5 km	MPC · JPL
262770	2006 YT_{4}	—	December 16, 2006	Mount Lemmon	Mount Lemmon Survey	·	4.7 km	MPC · JPL
262771	2006 YY_{5}	—	December 17, 2006	Mount Lemmon	Mount Lemmon Survey	·	2.1 km	MPC · JPL
262772	2006 YH_{7}	—	December 20, 2006	Palomar	NEAT	(5)	1.9 km	MPC · JPL
262773	2006 YR_{7}	—	December 20, 2006	Palomar	NEAT	EUN	2.4 km	MPC · JPL
262774	2006 YZ_{7}	—	December 20, 2006	Palomar	NEAT	ERI	2.2 km	MPC · JPL
262775	2006 YR_{8}	—	December 20, 2006	Mount Lemmon	Mount Lemmon Survey	·	1.4 km	MPC · JPL
262776	2006 YA_{12}	—	December 22, 2006	Gnosca	S. Sposetti	·	1.4 km	MPC · JPL
262777	2006 YR_{12}	—	December 23, 2006	Gnosca	S. Sposetti	·	3.0 km	MPC · JPL
262778	2006 YZ_{12}	—	December 25, 2006	Gnosca	S. Sposetti	EOS ·	2.9 km	MPC · JPL
262779	2006 YM_{13}	—	December 18, 2006	Socorro	LINEAR	MRX	1.2 km	MPC · JPL
262780	2006 YO_{13}	—	December 23, 2006	Catalina	CSS	·	1.8 km	MPC · JPL
262781	2006 YN_{14}	—	December 25, 2006	Vail-Jarnac	Jarnac	·	1.8 km	MPC · JPL
262782	2006 YF_{18}	—	December 22, 2006	Socorro	LINEAR	·	1.4 km	MPC · JPL
262783	2006 YL_{18}	—	December 23, 2006	Mount Lemmon	Mount Lemmon Survey	·	2.4 km	MPC · JPL
262784	2006 YS_{19}	—	December 24, 2006	Kitt Peak	Spacewatch	·	5.7 km	MPC · JPL
262785	2006 YD_{20}	—	December 20, 2006	Mount Lemmon	Mount Lemmon Survey	(5)	1.4 km	MPC · JPL
262786	2006 YO_{23}	—	December 21, 2006	Kitt Peak	Spacewatch	·	1.6 km	MPC · JPL
262787	2006 YJ_{25}	—	December 21, 2006	Kitt Peak	Spacewatch	·	2.4 km	MPC · JPL
262788	2006 YN_{29}	—	December 21, 2006	Kitt Peak	Spacewatch	·	4.5 km	MPC · JPL
262789	2006 YG_{34}	—	December 21, 2006	Kitt Peak	Spacewatch	·	2.3 km	MPC · JPL
262790	2006 YK_{34}	—	December 21, 2006	Kitt Peak	Spacewatch	HOF	2.8 km	MPC · JPL
262791	2006 YB_{37}	—	December 21, 2006	Kitt Peak	Spacewatch	·	1.7 km	MPC · JPL
262792	2006 YF_{38}	—	December 21, 2006	Kitt Peak	Spacewatch	·	1.3 km	MPC · JPL
262793	2006 YC_{39}	—	December 21, 2006	Kitt Peak	Spacewatch	·	1.8 km	MPC · JPL
262794	2006 YK_{42}	—	December 22, 2006	Socorro	LINEAR	·	2.1 km	MPC · JPL
262795	2006 YE_{43}	—	December 24, 2006	Mount Lemmon	Mount Lemmon Survey	·	2.0 km	MPC · JPL
262796	2006 YS_{46}	—	December 21, 2006	Mount Lemmon	Mount Lemmon Survey	·	1.4 km	MPC · JPL
262797	2006 YJ_{47}	—	December 22, 2006	Socorro	LINEAR	·	5.0 km	MPC · JPL
262798	2006 YY_{48}	—	December 22, 2006	Socorro	LINEAR	·	4.1 km	MPC · JPL
262799	2006 YD_{50}	—	December 21, 2006	Kitt Peak	M. W. Buie	KOR	1.3 km	MPC · JPL
262800	2006 YK_{50}	—	December 21, 2006	Kitt Peak	M. W. Buie	·	1.3 km	MPC · JPL

== 262801–262900 ==
back to top

Designation			Discovery			Properties		Ref
Permanent	Provisional	Named after	Date	Site	Discoverer(s)	Category	Diam.	Ref
262801	2006 YP_{52}	—	December 16, 2006	Kitt Peak	Spacewatch	EOS	2.3 km	MPC · JPL
262802	2006 YU_{53}	—	December 27, 2006	Mount Lemmon	Mount Lemmon Survey	·	2.1 km	MPC · JPL
262803	2006 YZ_{53}	—	December 27, 2006	Mount Lemmon	Mount Lemmon Survey	·	5.1 km	MPC · JPL
262804	2006 YE_{54}	—	December 24, 2006	Kitt Peak	Spacewatch	·	2.4 km	MPC · JPL
262805	2006 YS_{54}	—	December 27, 2006	Mount Lemmon	Mount Lemmon Survey	·	2.1 km	MPC · JPL
262806	2006 YX_{54}	—	December 27, 2006	Mount Lemmon	Mount Lemmon Survey	(5)	1.3 km	MPC · JPL
262807	2007 AU	—	January 8, 2007	Mount Lemmon	Mount Lemmon Survey	·	1.7 km	MPC · JPL
262808	2007 AW	—	January 8, 2007	Mount Lemmon	Mount Lemmon Survey	AGN	1.8 km	MPC · JPL
262809	2007 AA_{5}	—	January 8, 2007	Mount Lemmon	Mount Lemmon Survey	·	1.7 km	MPC · JPL
262810	2007 AR_{5}	—	January 8, 2007	Mount Lemmon	Mount Lemmon Survey	·	2.5 km	MPC · JPL
262811	2007 AM_{7}	—	January 9, 2007	Mount Lemmon	Mount Lemmon Survey	·	1.7 km	MPC · JPL
262812	2007 AG_{8}	—	January 10, 2007	Mount Nyukasa	Japan Aerospace Exploration Agency	·	2.5 km	MPC · JPL
262813	2007 AN_{8}	—	January 10, 2007	Mount Nyukasa	Japan Aerospace Exploration Agency	·	4.3 km	MPC · JPL
262814	2007 AR_{9}	—	January 8, 2007	Kitt Peak	Spacewatch	AGN	1.4 km	MPC · JPL
262815	2007 AA_{10}	—	January 8, 2007	Mount Lemmon	Mount Lemmon Survey	MRX	1.6 km	MPC · JPL
262816	2007 AM_{10}	—	January 10, 2007	Kitt Peak	Spacewatch	·	1.8 km	MPC · JPL
262817	2007 AJ_{14}	—	January 9, 2007	Mount Lemmon	Mount Lemmon Survey	·	2.3 km	MPC · JPL
262818	2007 AQ_{16}	—	January 13, 2007	Socorro	LINEAR	(5)	1.6 km	MPC · JPL
262819	2007 AQ_{17}	—	January 15, 2007	Anderson Mesa	LONEOS	·	2.4 km	MPC · JPL
262820	2007 AG_{18}	—	January 8, 2007	Catalina	CSS	·	1.8 km	MPC · JPL
262821	2007 AH_{19}	—	January 15, 2007	Anderson Mesa	LONEOS	·	1.8 km	MPC · JPL
262822	2007 AL_{19}	—	January 15, 2007	Catalina	CSS	NEM	3.5 km	MPC · JPL
262823	2007 AP_{19}	—	January 15, 2007	Anderson Mesa	LONEOS	·	2.4 km	MPC · JPL
262824	2007 AB_{21}	—	January 10, 2007	Mount Lemmon	Mount Lemmon Survey	GEF	1.5 km	MPC · JPL
262825 Dianearbus	2007 AD_{23}	Dianearbus	January 10, 2007	Mount Lemmon	Mount Lemmon Survey	·	4.0 km	MPC · JPL
262826	2007 AM_{23}	—	January 10, 2007	Mount Lemmon	Mount Lemmon Survey	·	2.8 km	MPC · JPL
262827	2007 AN_{23}	—	January 10, 2007	Mount Lemmon	Mount Lemmon Survey	·	1.6 km	MPC · JPL
262828	2007 AN_{27}	—	January 10, 2007	Mount Lemmon	Mount Lemmon Survey	·	1.3 km	MPC · JPL
262829	2007 AO_{27}	—	January 8, 2007	Kitt Peak	Spacewatch	·	3.7 km	MPC · JPL
262830	2007 AY_{28}	—	January 10, 2007	Mount Lemmon	Mount Lemmon Survey	·	1.8 km	MPC · JPL
262831	2007 AW_{29}	—	January 10, 2007	Mount Lemmon	Mount Lemmon Survey	AGN	1.5 km	MPC · JPL
262832	2007 BP	—	January 16, 2007	Socorro	LINEAR	·	1.9 km	MPC · JPL
262833	2007 BD_{1}	—	January 16, 2007	Catalina	CSS	·	2.0 km	MPC · JPL
262834	2007 BY_{1}	—	January 16, 2007	Mount Lemmon	Mount Lemmon Survey	·	1.7 km	MPC · JPL
262835	2007 BE_{2}	—	January 16, 2007	Catalina	CSS	(5)	1.8 km	MPC · JPL
262836	2007 BN_{3}	—	January 16, 2007	Socorro	LINEAR	(5)	1.4 km	MPC · JPL
262837	2007 BP_{3}	—	January 16, 2007	Anderson Mesa	LONEOS	·	1.9 km	MPC · JPL
262838	2007 BM_{4}	—	January 16, 2007	Catalina	CSS	(5)	1.9 km	MPC · JPL
262839	2007 BF_{5}	—	January 17, 2007	Palomar	NEAT	·	1.7 km	MPC · JPL
262840	2007 BM_{5}	—	January 17, 2007	Catalina	CSS	·	1.9 km	MPC · JPL
262841	2007 BB_{6}	—	January 17, 2007	Palomar	NEAT	·	4.6 km	MPC · JPL
262842	2007 BT_{6}	—	January 17, 2007	Palomar	NEAT	EOS	3.5 km	MPC · JPL
262843	2007 BO_{8}	—	January 16, 2007	Catalina	CSS	·	6.3 km	MPC · JPL
262844	2007 BQ_{10}	—	January 17, 2007	Kitt Peak	Spacewatch	·	2.3 km	MPC · JPL
262845	2007 BL_{12}	—	January 17, 2007	Kitt Peak	Spacewatch	(5)	1.1 km	MPC · JPL
262846	2007 BX_{16}	—	January 17, 2007	Palomar	NEAT	·	1.4 km	MPC · JPL
262847	2007 BR_{17}	—	January 17, 2007	Kitt Peak	Spacewatch	·	5.7 km	MPC · JPL
262848	2007 BT_{17}	—	January 17, 2007	Palomar	NEAT	·	1.6 km	MPC · JPL
262849	2007 BC_{19}	—	January 18, 2007	Palomar	NEAT	(5)	1.7 km	MPC · JPL
262850	2007 BK_{19}	—	January 21, 2007	Socorro	LINEAR	·	2.6 km	MPC · JPL
262851	2007 BT_{19}	—	January 23, 2007	Anderson Mesa	LONEOS	·	1.9 km	MPC · JPL
262852	2007 BN_{20}	—	January 23, 2007	Anderson Mesa	LONEOS	·	2.2 km	MPC · JPL
262853	2007 BF_{21}	—	January 23, 2007	Socorro	LINEAR	·	2.8 km	MPC · JPL
262854	2007 BQ_{30}	—	January 25, 2007	Kitt Peak	Spacewatch	·	2.0 km	MPC · JPL
262855	2007 BS_{31}	—	January 23, 2007	Socorro	LINEAR	EUN	1.7 km	MPC · JPL
262856	2007 BP_{33}	—	January 24, 2007	Mount Lemmon	Mount Lemmon Survey	EOS	2.7 km	MPC · JPL
262857	2007 BV_{33}	—	January 24, 2007	Mount Lemmon	Mount Lemmon Survey	·	1.6 km	MPC · JPL
262858	2007 BR_{34}	—	January 24, 2007	Mount Lemmon	Mount Lemmon Survey	·	1.5 km	MPC · JPL
262859	2007 BG_{35}	—	January 24, 2007	Socorro	LINEAR	·	1.9 km	MPC · JPL
262860	2007 BS_{36}	—	January 24, 2007	Socorro	LINEAR	AGN	1.5 km	MPC · JPL
262861	2007 BG_{38}	—	January 24, 2007	Catalina	CSS	·	2.7 km	MPC · JPL
262862	2007 BS_{38}	—	January 24, 2007	Catalina	CSS	·	1.5 km	MPC · JPL
262863	2007 BY_{38}	—	January 24, 2007	Kitt Peak	Spacewatch	·	3.8 km	MPC · JPL
262864	2007 BG_{39}	—	January 24, 2007	Mount Lemmon	Mount Lemmon Survey	·	1.8 km	MPC · JPL
262865	2007 BZ_{40}	—	January 24, 2007	Mount Lemmon	Mount Lemmon Survey	·	1.6 km	MPC · JPL
262866	2007 BD_{47}	—	January 26, 2007	Kitt Peak	Spacewatch	·	2.1 km	MPC · JPL
262867	2007 BH_{48}	—	January 26, 2007	Kitt Peak	Spacewatch	·	1.8 km	MPC · JPL
262868	2007 BS_{48}	—	January 26, 2007	Kitt Peak	Spacewatch	·	2.9 km	MPC · JPL
262869	2007 BD_{49}	—	January 26, 2007	Kitt Peak	Spacewatch	EOS	2.2 km	MPC · JPL
262870	2007 BM_{50}	—	January 23, 2007	Socorro	LINEAR	·	5.7 km	MPC · JPL
262871	2007 BB_{51}	—	January 24, 2007	Kitt Peak	Spacewatch	MAR	1.2 km	MPC · JPL
262872	2007 BJ_{58}	—	January 24, 2007	Catalina	CSS	·	2.1 km	MPC · JPL
262873	2007 BR_{58}	—	January 24, 2007	Catalina	CSS	(5)	1.5 km	MPC · JPL
262874	2007 BV_{58}	—	January 24, 2007	Catalina	CSS	·	1.2 km	MPC · JPL
262875	2007 BD_{62}	—	January 27, 2007	Mount Lemmon	Mount Lemmon Survey	·	1.8 km	MPC · JPL
262876 Davidlynch	2007 BL_{73}	Davidlynch	January 21, 2007	Nogales	J.-C. Merlin	·	2.2 km	MPC · JPL
262877	2007 BM_{74}	—	January 17, 2007	Kitt Peak	Spacewatch	·	2.4 km	MPC · JPL
262878	2007 BV_{74}	—	January 27, 2007	Mount Lemmon	Mount Lemmon Survey	·	1.8 km	MPC · JPL
262879	2007 BC_{75}	—	January 27, 2007	Kitt Peak	Spacewatch	·	2.6 km	MPC · JPL
262880	2007 BT_{75}	—	January 17, 2007	Kitt Peak	Spacewatch	·	1.7 km	MPC · JPL
262881	2007 BE_{78}	—	January 28, 2007	Mount Lemmon	Mount Lemmon Survey	·	2.9 km	MPC · JPL
262882	2007 BA_{80}	—	January 24, 2007	Catalina	CSS	·	4.0 km	MPC · JPL
262883	2007 CX_{1}	—	February 6, 2007	Kitt Peak	Spacewatch	KOR	1.3 km	MPC · JPL
262884	2007 CQ_{2}	—	February 6, 2007	Kitt Peak	Spacewatch	·	4.1 km	MPC · JPL
262885	2007 CM_{5}	—	February 7, 2007	Catalina	CSS	T_{j} (2.95)	5.9 km	MPC · JPL
262886	2007 CK_{7}	—	February 6, 2007	Kitt Peak	Spacewatch	·	2.2 km	MPC · JPL
262887	2007 CD_{10}	—	February 6, 2007	Mount Lemmon	Mount Lemmon Survey	·	1.9 km	MPC · JPL
262888	2007 CG_{13}	—	February 6, 2007	Lulin	Lin, H.-C., Q. Ye	·	2.8 km	MPC · JPL
262889	2007 CW_{14}	—	February 7, 2007	Mount Lemmon	Mount Lemmon Survey	·	2.8 km	MPC · JPL
262890	2007 CJ_{17}	—	February 8, 2007	Mount Lemmon	Mount Lemmon Survey	·	1.9 km	MPC · JPL
262891	2007 CM_{17}	—	February 8, 2007	Mount Lemmon	Mount Lemmon Survey	EMA	5.4 km	MPC · JPL
262892	2007 CA_{20}	—	February 6, 2007	Palomar	NEAT	·	2.4 km	MPC · JPL
262893	2007 CP_{20}	—	February 6, 2007	Mount Lemmon	Mount Lemmon Survey	·	1.6 km	MPC · JPL
262894	2007 CU_{21}	—	February 6, 2007	Palomar	NEAT	·	2.3 km	MPC · JPL
262895	2007 CB_{23}	—	February 6, 2007	Mount Lemmon	Mount Lemmon Survey	·	2.6 km	MPC · JPL
262896	2007 CH_{25}	—	February 8, 2007	Kitt Peak	Spacewatch	·	1.5 km	MPC · JPL
262897	2007 CA_{30}	—	February 6, 2007	Mount Lemmon	Mount Lemmon Survey	·	2.0 km	MPC · JPL
262898	2007 CX_{33}	—	February 6, 2007	Mount Lemmon	Mount Lemmon Survey	·	2.0 km	MPC · JPL
262899	2007 CF_{40}	—	February 6, 2007	Mount Lemmon	Mount Lemmon Survey	EUN	1.5 km	MPC · JPL
262900	2007 CF_{42}	—	February 7, 2007	Mount Lemmon	Mount Lemmon Survey	·	1.6 km	MPC · JPL

== 262901–263000 ==
back to top

Designation			Discovery			Properties		Ref
Permanent	Provisional	Named after	Date	Site	Discoverer(s)	Category	Diam.	Ref
262901	2007 CV_{42}	—	February 7, 2007	Mount Lemmon	Mount Lemmon Survey	·	2.2 km	MPC · JPL
262902	2007 CQ_{44}	—	February 8, 2007	Palomar	NEAT	TEL	1.4 km	MPC · JPL
262903	2007 CC_{46}	—	February 8, 2007	Palomar	NEAT	EUN	2.1 km	MPC · JPL
262904	2007 CE_{46}	—	February 8, 2007	Palomar	NEAT	EOS	2.6 km	MPC · JPL
262905	2007 CS_{46}	—	February 8, 2007	Palomar	NEAT	·	2.4 km	MPC · JPL
262906	2007 CT_{46}	—	February 8, 2007	Palomar	NEAT	·	4.4 km	MPC · JPL
262907	2007 CV_{46}	—	February 8, 2007	Palomar	NEAT	·	3.1 km	MPC · JPL
262908	2007 CU_{50}	—	February 13, 2007	Catalina	CSS	EUN	1.7 km	MPC · JPL
262909	2007 CA_{51}	—	February 11, 2007	Cordell-Lorenz	D. T. Durig	·	2.1 km	MPC · JPL
262910	2007 CL_{51}	—	February 15, 2007	Vicques	M. Ory	·	4.3 km	MPC · JPL
262911	2007 CE_{52}	—	February 9, 2007	Catalina	CSS	·	2.9 km	MPC · JPL
262912	2007 CW_{52}	—	February 13, 2007	Mount Lemmon	Mount Lemmon Survey	3:2 · SHU	6.4 km	MPC · JPL
262913	2007 CF_{53}	—	February 13, 2007	Socorro	LINEAR	·	3.5 km	MPC · JPL
262914	2007 CW_{54}	—	February 15, 2007	Bergisch Gladbach	W. Bickel	·	1.7 km	MPC · JPL
262915	2007 CZ_{54}	—	February 10, 2007	Catalina	CSS	·	2.6 km	MPC · JPL
262916	2007 CK_{58}	—	February 9, 2007	Catalina	CSS	·	3.0 km	MPC · JPL
262917	2007 CC_{61}	—	February 13, 2007	Socorro	LINEAR	·	2.9 km	MPC · JPL
262918	2007 CA_{62}	—	February 10, 2007	Catalina	CSS	H	600 m	MPC · JPL
262919	2007 CB_{64}	—	February 15, 2007	Great Shefford	Birtwhistle, P.	AGN	1.3 km	MPC · JPL
262920	2007 CN_{64}	—	February 8, 2007	Kitt Peak	Spacewatch	·	1.5 km	MPC · JPL
262921	2007 CR_{64}	—	February 10, 2007	Mount Lemmon	Mount Lemmon Survey	·	2.4 km	MPC · JPL
262922	2007 CH_{65}	—	February 13, 2007	Mount Lemmon	Mount Lemmon Survey	·	2.1 km	MPC · JPL
262923	2007 DD_{2}	—	February 16, 2007	Catalina	CSS	·	4.5 km	MPC · JPL
262924	2007 DH_{4}	—	February 16, 2007	Mount Lemmon	Mount Lemmon Survey	·	2.2 km	MPC · JPL
262925	2007 DS_{4}	—	February 17, 2007	Kitt Peak	Spacewatch	·	2.2 km	MPC · JPL
262926	2007 DA_{7}	—	February 16, 2007	Catalina	CSS	·	2.8 km	MPC · JPL
262927	2007 DQ_{8}	—	February 17, 2007	Kitt Peak	Spacewatch	HOF	3.0 km	MPC · JPL
262928	2007 DQ_{9}	—	February 17, 2007	Kitt Peak	Spacewatch	·	2.2 km	MPC · JPL
262929	2007 DS_{9}	—	February 17, 2007	Socorro	LINEAR	·	2.8 km	MPC · JPL
262930	2007 DF_{12}	—	February 16, 2007	Palomar	NEAT	·	4.4 km	MPC · JPL
262931	2007 DM_{12}	—	February 16, 2007	Catalina	CSS	·	2.6 km	MPC · JPL
262932	2007 DB_{17}	—	February 17, 2007	Kitt Peak	Spacewatch	KOR	1.6 km	MPC · JPL
262933	2007 DY_{17}	—	February 17, 2007	Kitt Peak	Spacewatch	·	3.7 km	MPC · JPL
262934	2007 DO_{19}	—	February 17, 2007	Kitt Peak	Spacewatch	·	2.4 km	MPC · JPL
262935	2007 DW_{19}	—	February 17, 2007	Kitt Peak	Spacewatch	·	1.5 km	MPC · JPL
262936	2007 DJ_{21}	—	February 17, 2007	Kitt Peak	Spacewatch	·	3.0 km	MPC · JPL
262937	2007 DG_{25}	—	February 17, 2007	Kitt Peak	Spacewatch	KOR	1.4 km	MPC · JPL
262938	2007 DK_{27}	—	February 17, 2007	Kitt Peak	Spacewatch	·	4.1 km	MPC · JPL
262939	2007 DY_{28}	—	February 17, 2007	Kitt Peak	Spacewatch	PAD	2.1 km	MPC · JPL
262940	2007 DT_{30}	—	February 17, 2007	Kitt Peak	Spacewatch	·	4.0 km	MPC · JPL
262941	2007 DC_{31}	—	February 17, 2007	Kitt Peak	Spacewatch	·	3.6 km	MPC · JPL
262942	2007 DO_{32}	—	February 17, 2007	Kitt Peak	Spacewatch	KOR	1.7 km	MPC · JPL
262943	2007 DA_{33}	—	February 17, 2007	Kitt Peak	Spacewatch	·	4.4 km	MPC · JPL
262944	2007 DH_{37}	—	February 17, 2007	Kitt Peak	Spacewatch	·	2.2 km	MPC · JPL
262945	2007 DT_{41}	—	February 16, 2007	Mount Lemmon	Mount Lemmon Survey	AGN	1.9 km	MPC · JPL
262946	2007 DB_{43}	—	February 17, 2007	Mount Lemmon	Mount Lemmon Survey	·	2.5 km	MPC · JPL
262947	2007 DT_{45}	—	February 21, 2007	Kitt Peak	Spacewatch	·	3.4 km	MPC · JPL
262948	2007 DG_{48}	—	February 21, 2007	Mount Lemmon	Mount Lemmon Survey	·	2.9 km	MPC · JPL
262949	2007 DE_{51}	—	February 17, 2007	Kitt Peak	Spacewatch	URS	4.9 km	MPC · JPL
262950	2007 DK_{52}	—	February 19, 2007	Kitt Peak	Spacewatch	·	1.5 km	MPC · JPL
262951	2007 DN_{58}	—	February 21, 2007	Kitt Peak	Spacewatch	KOR	1.5 km	MPC · JPL
262952	2007 DC_{60}	—	February 23, 2007	Catalina	CSS	·	2.5 km	MPC · JPL
262953	2007 DL_{75}	—	February 21, 2007	Kitt Peak	Spacewatch	·	2.8 km	MPC · JPL
262954	2007 DN_{75}	—	February 21, 2007	Kitt Peak	Spacewatch	·	2.0 km	MPC · JPL
262955	2007 DC_{76}	—	February 21, 2007	Kitt Peak	Spacewatch	·	3.0 km	MPC · JPL
262956	2007 DA_{77}	—	February 22, 2007	Catalina	CSS	(5)	1.5 km	MPC · JPL
262957	2007 DQ_{77}	—	February 22, 2007	Kitt Peak	Spacewatch	·	4.0 km	MPC · JPL
262958	2007 DC_{78}	—	February 23, 2007	Catalina	CSS	·	2.8 km	MPC · JPL
262959	2007 DN_{84}	—	February 22, 2007	Calvin-Rehoboth	Calvin College	·	2.1 km	MPC · JPL
262960	2007 DY_{88}	—	February 23, 2007	Kitt Peak	Spacewatch	·	1.7 km	MPC · JPL
262961	2007 DT_{90}	—	February 23, 2007	Kitt Peak	Spacewatch	·	1.8 km	MPC · JPL
262962	2007 DY_{91}	—	February 23, 2007	Mount Lemmon	Mount Lemmon Survey	KOR	2.1 km	MPC · JPL
262963	2007 DH_{95}	—	February 23, 2007	Kitt Peak	Spacewatch	·	1.8 km	MPC · JPL
262964	2007 DH_{96}	—	February 23, 2007	Mount Lemmon	Mount Lemmon Survey	·	2.8 km	MPC · JPL
262965	2007 DR_{99}	—	February 25, 2007	Mount Lemmon	Mount Lemmon Survey	EMA	4.6 km	MPC · JPL
262966	2007 DO_{101}	—	February 26, 2007	Catalina	CSS	·	6.4 km	MPC · JPL
262967	2007 DT_{105}	—	February 17, 2007	Kitt Peak	Spacewatch	·	2.6 km	MPC · JPL
262968	2007 DO_{115}	—	February 21, 2007	Mount Lemmon	Mount Lemmon Survey	·	2.2 km	MPC · JPL
262969	2007 DN_{116}	—	February 16, 2007	Catalina	CSS	·	5.0 km	MPC · JPL
262970	2007 EB_{1}	—	March 6, 2007	Palomar	NEAT	·	2.8 km	MPC · JPL
262971	2007 EH_{9}	—	March 9, 2007	Mount Lemmon	Mount Lemmon Survey	(43176)	3.1 km	MPC · JPL
262972 Petermansfield	2007 ER_{9}	Petermansfield	March 9, 2007	Vallemare Borbona	V. S. Casulli	·	1.9 km	MPC · JPL
262973	2007 ET_{10}	—	March 9, 2007	Kitt Peak	Spacewatch	·	3.0 km	MPC · JPL
262974	2007 EK_{12}	—	March 9, 2007	Palomar	NEAT	·	3.7 km	MPC · JPL
262975	2007 EK_{14}	—	March 9, 2007	Palomar	NEAT	·	5.1 km	MPC · JPL
262976	2007 EV_{16}	—	March 9, 2007	Kitt Peak	Spacewatch	·	3.4 km	MPC · JPL
262977	2007 EX_{17}	—	March 9, 2007	Mount Lemmon	Mount Lemmon Survey	EOS	2.4 km	MPC · JPL
262978	2007 EN_{19}	—	March 10, 2007	Mount Lemmon	Mount Lemmon Survey	·	2.3 km	MPC · JPL
262979	2007 EL_{24}	—	March 10, 2007	Mount Lemmon	Mount Lemmon Survey	KOR	2.1 km	MPC · JPL
262980	2007 EE_{25}	—	March 10, 2007	Mount Lemmon	Mount Lemmon Survey	·	2.6 km	MPC · JPL
262981	2007 EJ_{30}	—	March 9, 2007	Palomar	NEAT	·	6.1 km	MPC · JPL
262982	2007 EG_{31}	—	March 10, 2007	Kitt Peak	Spacewatch	·	3.2 km	MPC · JPL
262983	2007 EK_{43}	—	March 9, 2007	Kitt Peak	Spacewatch	·	3.3 km	MPC · JPL
262984	2007 EX_{43}	—	March 9, 2007	Kitt Peak	Spacewatch	·	2.2 km	MPC · JPL
262985	2007 EG_{46}	—	March 9, 2007	Mount Lemmon	Mount Lemmon Survey	·	2.9 km	MPC · JPL
262986	2007 EC_{48}	—	March 9, 2007	Kitt Peak	Spacewatch	·	2.8 km	MPC · JPL
262987	2007 EA_{54}	—	March 11, 2007	Kitt Peak	Spacewatch	·	3.5 km	MPC · JPL
262988	2007 EJ_{62}	—	March 10, 2007	Kitt Peak	Spacewatch	·	3.3 km	MPC · JPL
262989	2007 ER_{70}	—	March 10, 2007	Kitt Peak	Spacewatch	KOR	1.8 km	MPC · JPL
262990	2007 EP_{80}	—	March 11, 2007	Kitt Peak	Spacewatch	·	2.2 km	MPC · JPL
262991	2007 EA_{83}	—	March 12, 2007	Kitt Peak	Spacewatch	GEF	1.3 km	MPC · JPL
262992	2007 EC_{90}	—	March 9, 2007	Mount Lemmon	Mount Lemmon Survey	·	3.2 km	MPC · JPL
262993	2007 EE_{90}	—	March 9, 2007	Mount Lemmon	Mount Lemmon Survey	KOR	1.6 km	MPC · JPL
262994	2007 EJ_{92}	—	March 10, 2007	Kitt Peak	Spacewatch	·	2.2 km	MPC · JPL
262995	2007 EP_{97}	—	March 11, 2007	Kitt Peak	Spacewatch	·	5.2 km	MPC · JPL
262996	2007 EU_{98}	—	March 11, 2007	Kitt Peak	Spacewatch	·	3.2 km	MPC · JPL
262997	2007 EK_{106}	—	March 11, 2007	Kitt Peak	Spacewatch	·	2.7 km	MPC · JPL
262998	2007 EW_{106}	—	March 11, 2007	Anderson Mesa	LONEOS	·	3.2 km	MPC · JPL
262999	2007 EP_{109}	—	March 11, 2007	Kitt Peak	Spacewatch	·	2.3 km	MPC · JPL
263000	2007 ET_{109}	—	March 11, 2007	Kitt Peak	Spacewatch	KOR	1.8 km	MPC · JPL

back to top

== See also ==
- Meanings of minor-planet names: 262001–263000
