= List of minor planets: 261001–262000 =

The following is a partial list of minor planets, running from minor-planet number 261001 through 262000, inclusive. The primary data for this and other partial lists is based on JPL's "Small-Body Orbital Elements" and data available from the Minor Planet Center. Critical list information is also provided by the MPC, unless otherwise specified from Lowell Observatory. A detailed description of the table's columns and additional sources are given on the main page including a complete list of every page in this series, and a statistical break-up on the dynamical classification of minor planets.

Also see the summary list of all named bodies in numerical and alphabetical order, and the corresponding naming citations for the number range of this particular list. New namings may only be added to this list after official publication, as the preannouncement of names is condemned by the Working Group for Small Bodies Nomenclature of the International Astronomical Union.

Near-Earth obj.	MBA (inner)	MBA (outer)	Centaur
Mars-crosser	MBA (middle)	Jupiter trojan	Trans-Neptunian obj.
Unclassified

== 261001–261100 ==
Designation			Discovery			Properties		Ref
Permanent	Provisional	Named after	Date	Site	Discoverer(s)	Category	Diam.	Ref
261001	2005 SN_{95}	—	September 25, 2005	Kitt Peak	Spacewatch	·	2.7 km	MPC · JPL
261002	2005 SS_{95}	—	September 25, 2005	Kitt Peak	Spacewatch	AST	1.7 km	MPC · JPL
261003	2005 SW_{95}	—	September 25, 2005	Kitt Peak	Spacewatch	·	2.9 km	MPC · JPL
261004	2005 SW_{96}	—	September 25, 2005	Palomar	NEAT	DOR	2.7 km	MPC · JPL
261005	2005 SB_{97}	—	September 25, 2005	Kitt Peak	Spacewatch	EOS	2.0 km	MPC · JPL
261006	2005 ST_{98}	—	September 25, 2005	Kitt Peak	Spacewatch	BRA	1.7 km	MPC · JPL
261007	2005 SB_{100}	—	September 25, 2005	Kitt Peak	Spacewatch	GEF	1.7 km	MPC · JPL
261008	2005 SX_{101}	—	September 25, 2005	Kitt Peak	Spacewatch	·	2.3 km	MPC · JPL
261009	2005 SH_{102}	—	September 25, 2005	Kitt Peak	Spacewatch	·	2.9 km	MPC · JPL
261010	2005 SY_{103}	—	September 25, 2005	Palomar	NEAT	·	4.3 km	MPC · JPL
261011	2005 SU_{104}	—	September 25, 2005	Kitt Peak	Spacewatch	EOS	2.5 km	MPC · JPL
261012	2005 SZ_{106}	—	September 26, 2005	Catalina	CSS	·	3.5 km	MPC · JPL
261013	2005 SY_{107}	—	September 26, 2005	Kitt Peak	Spacewatch	EOS	2.1 km	MPC · JPL
261014	2005 SQ_{110}	—	September 26, 2005	Kitt Peak	Spacewatch	KOR	1.5 km	MPC · JPL
261015	2005 SV_{110}	—	September 26, 2005	Kitt Peak	Spacewatch	·	2.5 km	MPC · JPL
261016	2005 SZ_{110}	—	September 26, 2005	Kitt Peak	Spacewatch	·	1.8 km	MPC · JPL
261017	2005 SK_{111}	—	September 26, 2005	Palomar	NEAT	·	2.5 km	MPC · JPL
261018	2005 SP_{118}	—	September 28, 2005	Palomar	NEAT	EOS	2.8 km	MPC · JPL
261019	2005 SZ_{119}	—	September 29, 2005	Kitt Peak	Spacewatch	·	1.8 km	MPC · JPL
261020	2005 SU_{120}	—	September 29, 2005	Kitt Peak	Spacewatch	·	2.1 km	MPC · JPL
261021	2005 SZ_{121}	—	September 29, 2005	Kitt Peak	Spacewatch	VER	4.4 km	MPC · JPL
261022	2005 SE_{123}	—	September 29, 2005	Anderson Mesa	LONEOS	HOF	3.9 km	MPC · JPL
261023	2005 SU_{126}	—	September 29, 2005	Mount Lemmon	Mount Lemmon Survey	KOR	1.3 km	MPC · JPL
261024	2005 SN_{127}	—	September 29, 2005	Mount Lemmon	Mount Lemmon Survey	·	4.4 km	MPC · JPL
261025	2005 SX_{127}	—	September 29, 2005	Mount Lemmon	Mount Lemmon Survey	WIT	1.1 km	MPC · JPL
261026	2005 SM_{129}	—	September 29, 2005	Mount Lemmon	Mount Lemmon Survey	·	3.3 km	MPC · JPL
261027	2005 SL_{130}	—	September 29, 2005	Anderson Mesa	LONEOS	·	3.6 km	MPC · JPL
261028	2005 SC_{131}	—	September 29, 2005	Mount Lemmon	Mount Lemmon Survey	HOF	2.8 km	MPC · JPL
261029	2005 SD_{133}	—	September 29, 2005	Kitt Peak	Spacewatch	·	3.0 km	MPC · JPL
261030	2005 SJ_{135}	—	September 24, 2005	Kitt Peak	Spacewatch	·	1.9 km	MPC · JPL
261031	2005 SH_{138}	—	September 25, 2005	Palomar	NEAT	·	2.1 km	MPC · JPL
261032	2005 SS_{138}	—	September 25, 2005	Kitt Peak	Spacewatch	·	3.1 km	MPC · JPL
261033	2005 SU_{139}	—	September 25, 2005	Kitt Peak	Spacewatch	·	1.2 km	MPC · JPL
261034	2005 SG_{140}	—	September 25, 2005	Kitt Peak	Spacewatch	EOS	1.6 km	MPC · JPL
261035	2005 SU_{141}	—	September 25, 2005	Kitt Peak	Spacewatch	·	1.8 km	MPC · JPL
261036	2005 SF_{142}	—	September 25, 2005	Kitt Peak	Spacewatch	VER	3.8 km	MPC · JPL
261037	2005 SR_{143}	—	September 25, 2005	Kitt Peak	Spacewatch	EOS	3.5 km	MPC · JPL
261038	2005 SV_{146}	—	September 25, 2005	Kitt Peak	Spacewatch	·	3.0 km	MPC · JPL
261039	2005 SZ_{146}	—	September 25, 2005	Kitt Peak	Spacewatch	·	2.4 km	MPC · JPL
261040	2005 SJ_{147}	—	September 25, 2005	Kitt Peak	Spacewatch	·	1.6 km	MPC · JPL
261041	2005 SN_{148}	—	September 25, 2005	Kitt Peak	Spacewatch	·	2.6 km	MPC · JPL
261042	2005 SS_{149}	—	September 25, 2005	Kitt Peak	Spacewatch	·	2.0 km	MPC · JPL
261043	2005 SZ_{150}	—	September 25, 2005	Kitt Peak	Spacewatch	AST	1.8 km	MPC · JPL
261044	2005 SB_{154}	—	September 26, 2005	Kitt Peak	Spacewatch	·	3.8 km	MPC · JPL
261045	2005 SB_{155}	—	September 26, 2005	Kitt Peak	Spacewatch	·	2.3 km	MPC · JPL
261046	2005 ST_{156}	—	September 26, 2005	Kitt Peak	Spacewatch	·	4.7 km	MPC · JPL
261047	2005 SC_{157}	—	September 26, 2005	Kitt Peak	Spacewatch	WIT	1.1 km	MPC · JPL
261048	2005 SZ_{157}	—	September 26, 2005	Kitt Peak	Spacewatch	·	2.4 km	MPC · JPL
261049	2005 SY_{165}	—	September 28, 2005	Palomar	NEAT	·	4.2 km	MPC · JPL
261050	2005 SP_{169}	—	September 29, 2005	Kitt Peak	Spacewatch	·	4.0 km	MPC · JPL
261051	2005 SF_{173}	—	September 29, 2005	Kitt Peak	Spacewatch	·	2.3 km	MPC · JPL
261052	2005 SW_{173}	—	September 29, 2005	Anderson Mesa	LONEOS	·	2.4 km	MPC · JPL
261053	2005 SM_{177}	—	September 29, 2005	Kitt Peak	Spacewatch	VER	4.5 km	MPC · JPL
261054	2005 SW_{177}	—	September 29, 2005	Kitt Peak	Spacewatch	·	3.6 km	MPC · JPL
261055	2005 ST_{178}	—	September 29, 2005	Anderson Mesa	LONEOS	·	3.0 km	MPC · JPL
261056	2005 SL_{180}	—	September 29, 2005	Mount Lemmon	Mount Lemmon Survey	EOS	2.8 km	MPC · JPL
261057	2005 SS_{180}	—	September 29, 2005	Mount Lemmon	Mount Lemmon Survey	·	2.4 km	MPC · JPL
261058	2005 SH_{181}	—	September 29, 2005	Kitt Peak	Spacewatch	·	3.6 km	MPC · JPL
261059	2005 SJ_{181}	—	September 29, 2005	Kitt Peak	Spacewatch	AGN	1.4 km	MPC · JPL
261060	2005 ST_{185}	—	September 29, 2005	Mount Lemmon	Mount Lemmon Survey	·	3.2 km	MPC · JPL
261061	2005 SC_{187}	—	September 29, 2005	Palomar	NEAT	·	4.6 km	MPC · JPL
261062	2005 SV_{188}	—	September 29, 2005	Mount Lemmon	Mount Lemmon Survey	·	2.9 km	MPC · JPL
261063	2005 SA_{189}	—	September 29, 2005	Anderson Mesa	LONEOS	·	3.2 km	MPC · JPL
261064	2005 SD_{189}	—	September 29, 2005	Mount Lemmon	Mount Lemmon Survey	·	1.7 km	MPC · JPL
261065	2005 SP_{190}	—	September 29, 2005	Anderson Mesa	LONEOS	·	2.9 km	MPC · JPL
261066	2005 SM_{191}	—	September 29, 2005	Palomar	NEAT	·	4.1 km	MPC · JPL
261067	2005 SL_{200}	—	September 30, 2005	Kitt Peak	Spacewatch	EOS	2.0 km	MPC · JPL
261068	2005 SA_{201}	—	September 30, 2005	Kitt Peak	Spacewatch	·	1.5 km	MPC · JPL
261069	2005 SY_{202}	—	September 30, 2005	Palomar	NEAT	·	2.0 km	MPC · JPL
261070	2005 SX_{204}	—	September 30, 2005	Anderson Mesa	LONEOS	·	4.6 km	MPC · JPL
261071	2005 SZ_{206}	—	September 30, 2005	Mount Lemmon	Mount Lemmon Survey	·	1.4 km	MPC · JPL
261072	2005 SX_{207}	—	September 30, 2005	Catalina	CSS	·	3.1 km	MPC · JPL
261073	2005 SJ_{208}	—	September 30, 2005	Kitt Peak	Spacewatch	VER	3.9 km	MPC · JPL
261074	2005 SK_{209}	—	September 30, 2005	Palomar	NEAT	HNS	1.5 km	MPC · JPL
261075	2005 SM_{211}	—	September 30, 2005	Mount Lemmon	Mount Lemmon Survey	·	2.4 km	MPC · JPL
261076	2005 SC_{214}	—	September 30, 2005	Anderson Mesa	LONEOS	·	3.0 km	MPC · JPL
261077	2005 SQ_{214}	—	September 30, 2005	Catalina	CSS	·	3.5 km	MPC · JPL
261078	2005 SF_{217}	—	September 30, 2005	Mount Lemmon	Mount Lemmon Survey	THM	2.5 km	MPC · JPL
261079	2005 SN_{219}	—	September 30, 2005	Mount Lemmon	Mount Lemmon Survey	·	4.3 km	MPC · JPL
261080	2005 SJ_{220}	—	September 29, 2005	Catalina	CSS	·	2.4 km	MPC · JPL
261081	2005 SH_{225}	—	September 29, 2005	Palomar	NEAT	·	2.4 km	MPC · JPL
261082	2005 SP_{226}	—	September 30, 2005	Kitt Peak	Spacewatch	·	2.7 km	MPC · JPL
261083	2005 SK_{227}	—	September 30, 2005	Kitt Peak	Spacewatch	·	1.7 km	MPC · JPL
261084	2005 ST_{232}	—	September 30, 2005	Mount Lemmon	Mount Lemmon Survey	(159)	3.3 km	MPC · JPL
261085	2005 SB_{234}	—	September 29, 2005	Kitt Peak	Spacewatch	AGN	1.0 km	MPC · JPL
261086	2005 SD_{235}	—	September 29, 2005	Mount Lemmon	Mount Lemmon Survey	·	2.0 km	MPC · JPL
261087	2005 SN_{240}	—	September 30, 2005	Kitt Peak	Spacewatch	·	4.1 km	MPC · JPL
261088	2005 SY_{243}	—	September 30, 2005	Mount Lemmon	Mount Lemmon Survey	(12739)	1.7 km	MPC · JPL
261089	2005 SK_{244}	—	September 30, 2005	Mount Lemmon	Mount Lemmon Survey	WIT	1.2 km	MPC · JPL
261090	2005 SL_{246}	—	September 30, 2005	Kitt Peak	Spacewatch	AGN	1.5 km	MPC · JPL
261091	2005 SW_{246}	—	September 30, 2005	Kitt Peak	Spacewatch	·	2.4 km	MPC · JPL
261092	2005 SH_{251}	—	September 24, 2005	Palomar	NEAT	·	2.0 km	MPC · JPL
261093	2005 ST_{251}	—	September 24, 2005	Palomar	NEAT	·	3.3 km	MPC · JPL
261094	2005 SC_{252}	—	September 24, 2005	Palomar	NEAT	·	4.6 km	MPC · JPL
261095	2005 SD_{255}	—	September 22, 2005	Palomar	NEAT	·	1.5 km	MPC · JPL
261096	2005 ST_{259}	—	September 25, 2005	Catalina	CSS	·	2.9 km	MPC · JPL
261097	2005 SE_{261}	—	September 26, 2005	Palomar	NEAT	·	2.4 km	MPC · JPL
261098	2005 SN_{262}	—	September 23, 2005	Catalina	CSS	·	2.9 km	MPC · JPL
261099	2005 SP_{262}	—	September 23, 2005	Catalina	CSS	·	1.8 km	MPC · JPL
261100	2005 SO_{267}	—	September 30, 2005	Kitt Peak	Spacewatch	·	2.0 km	MPC · JPL

== 261101–261200 ==
back to top

Designation			Discovery			Properties		Ref
Permanent	Provisional	Named after	Date	Site	Discoverer(s)	Category	Diam.	Ref
261101	2005 SU_{271}	—	September 26, 2005	Palomar	NEAT	KOR	1.6 km	MPC · JPL
261102	2005 SW_{272}	—	September 30, 2005	Anderson Mesa	LONEOS	·	2.1 km	MPC · JPL
261103	2005 SB_{275}	—	September 30, 2005	Anderson Mesa	LONEOS	AGN	1.5 km	MPC · JPL
261104	2005 SN_{278}	—	September 25, 2005	Kitt Peak	Spacewatch	·	2.3 km	MPC · JPL
261105	2005 SW_{279}	—	September 23, 2005	Catalina	CSS	·	2.0 km	MPC · JPL
261106	2005 SB_{281}	—	September 29, 2005	Kitt Peak	Spacewatch	AGN	1.4 km	MPC · JPL
261107 Cameroncasimir	2005 SW_{282}	Cameroncasimir	September 21, 2005	Apache Point	A. C. Becker	·	2.1 km	MPC · JPL
261108 Obanhelian	2005 SZ_{283}	Obanhelian	September 24, 2005	Apache Point	A. C. Becker	·	2.7 km	MPC · JPL
261109 Annie	2005 SN_{284}	Annie	September 25, 2005	Apache Point	A. C. Becker	VER ·	4.1 km	MPC · JPL
261110 Neoma	2005 SE_{285}	Neoma	September 25, 2005	Apache Point	A. C. Becker	·	2.3 km	MPC · JPL
261111	2005 SQ_{286}	—	September 26, 2005	Apache Point	A. C. Becker	·	2.5 km	MPC · JPL
261112	2005 SM_{291}	—	September 23, 2005	Kitt Peak	Spacewatch	·	2.4 km	MPC · JPL
261113	2005 SJ_{292}	—	September 29, 2005	Kitt Peak	Spacewatch	HOF	3.0 km	MPC · JPL
261114	2005 TO_{2}	—	October 1, 2005	Catalina	CSS	HOF	3.2 km	MPC · JPL
261115	2005 TS_{3}	—	October 1, 2005	Anderson Mesa	LONEOS	·	4.3 km	MPC · JPL
261116	2005 TQ_{5}	—	October 1, 2005	Catalina	CSS	·	1.9 km	MPC · JPL
261117	2005 TS_{6}	—	October 1, 2005	Catalina	CSS	·	2.5 km	MPC · JPL
261118	2005 TX_{9}	—	October 2, 2005	Palomar	NEAT	·	5.8 km	MPC · JPL
261119	2005 TX_{10}	—	October 2, 2005	Mount Lemmon	Mount Lemmon Survey	·	2.6 km	MPC · JPL
261120	2005 TJ_{11}	—	October 1, 2005	Kitt Peak	Spacewatch	·	2.5 km	MPC · JPL
261121	2005 TC_{13}	—	October 2, 2005	Mount Lemmon	Mount Lemmon Survey	HOF	2.8 km	MPC · JPL
261122	2005 TC_{18}	—	October 1, 2005	Socorro	LINEAR	·	2.4 km	MPC · JPL
261123	2005 TP_{18}	—	October 1, 2005	Socorro	LINEAR	·	2.0 km	MPC · JPL
261124	2005 TR_{18}	—	October 1, 2005	Catalina	CSS	·	2.5 km	MPC · JPL
261125	2005 TG_{21}	—	October 1, 2005	Kitt Peak	Spacewatch	HYG	2.9 km	MPC · JPL
261126	2005 TS_{23}	—	October 1, 2005	Catalina	CSS	AGN	1.6 km	MPC · JPL
261127	2005 TM_{26}	—	October 1, 2005	Mount Lemmon	Mount Lemmon Survey	AGN	1.6 km	MPC · JPL
261128	2005 TR_{27}	—	October 1, 2005	Catalina	CSS	·	4.4 km	MPC · JPL
261129	2005 TV_{27}	—	October 1, 2005	Catalina	CSS	MRX	1.5 km	MPC · JPL
261130	2005 TG_{30}	—	October 4, 2005	Palomar	NEAT	INA	3.4 km	MPC · JPL
261131	2005 TE_{33}	—	October 1, 2005	Kitt Peak	Spacewatch	ADE	2.2 km	MPC · JPL
261132	2005 TO_{34}	—	October 1, 2005	Kitt Peak	Spacewatch	·	3.2 km	MPC · JPL
261133	2005 TB_{47}	—	October 3, 2005	Catalina	CSS	·	1.8 km	MPC · JPL
261134	2005 TS_{47}	—	October 5, 2005	Bergisch Gladbach	W. Bickel	·	3.6 km	MPC · JPL
261135	2005 TB_{51}	—	October 2, 2005	Kitt Peak	Spacewatch	·	5.4 km	MPC · JPL
261136	2005 TK_{52}	—	October 8, 2005	Moletai	K. Černis, Zdanavicius, J.	·	2.5 km	MPC · JPL
261137	2005 TZ_{55}	—	October 6, 2005	Anderson Mesa	LONEOS	·	4.3 km	MPC · JPL
261138	2005 TQ_{57}	—	October 1, 2005	Mount Lemmon	Mount Lemmon Survey	·	1.7 km	MPC · JPL
261139	2005 TZ_{57}	—	October 1, 2005	Mount Lemmon	Mount Lemmon Survey	·	4.3 km	MPC · JPL
261140	2005 TM_{61}	—	October 3, 2005	Catalina	CSS	·	2.1 km	MPC · JPL
261141	2005 TL_{63}	—	October 5, 2005	Goodricke-Pigott	R. A. Tucker	·	1.9 km	MPC · JPL
261142	2005 TK_{70}	—	October 6, 2005	Mount Lemmon	Mount Lemmon Survey	AGN	1 km	MPC · JPL
261143	2005 TY_{72}	—	October 5, 2005	Catalina	CSS	·	2.6 km	MPC · JPL
261144	2005 TD_{73}	—	October 5, 2005	Catalina	CSS	·	2.8 km	MPC · JPL
261145	2005 TC_{76}	—	October 5, 2005	Catalina	CSS	·	2.9 km	MPC · JPL
261146	2005 TK_{76}	—	October 5, 2005	Catalina	CSS	·	3.6 km	MPC · JPL
261147	2005 TQ_{76}	—	October 5, 2005	Catalina	CSS	·	3.0 km	MPC · JPL
261148	2005 TX_{76}	—	October 5, 2005	Catalina	CSS	·	2.4 km	MPC · JPL
261149	2005 TM_{79}	—	October 8, 2005	Catalina	CSS	·	2.6 km	MPC · JPL
261150	2005 TN_{79}	—	October 8, 2005	Anderson Mesa	LONEOS	fast	3.4 km	MPC · JPL
261151	2005 TH_{80}	—	October 3, 2005	Kitt Peak	Spacewatch	WIT	1.1 km	MPC · JPL
261152	2005 TU_{81}	—	October 3, 2005	Kitt Peak	Spacewatch	HOF	2.8 km	MPC · JPL
261153	2005 TN_{82}	—	October 3, 2005	Kitt Peak	Spacewatch	EOS	2.6 km	MPC · JPL
261154	2005 TM_{86}	—	October 5, 2005	Kitt Peak	Spacewatch	HYG	3.3 km	MPC · JPL
261155	2005 TK_{87}	—	October 5, 2005	Kitt Peak	Spacewatch	·	1.9 km	MPC · JPL
261156	2005 TS_{90}	—	October 6, 2005	Mount Lemmon	Mount Lemmon Survey	·	2.0 km	MPC · JPL
261157	2005 TU_{91}	—	October 6, 2005	Catalina	CSS	·	5.1 km	MPC · JPL
261158	2005 TU_{92}	—	October 6, 2005	Kitt Peak	Spacewatch	·	2.2 km	MPC · JPL
261159	2005 TK_{96}	—	October 6, 2005	Mount Lemmon	Mount Lemmon Survey	EOS	2.4 km	MPC · JPL
261160	2005 TV_{99}	—	October 7, 2005	Socorro	LINEAR	·	2.2 km	MPC · JPL
261161	2005 TT_{100}	—	October 7, 2005	Kitt Peak	Spacewatch	AGN	1.5 km	MPC · JPL
261162	2005 TY_{100}	—	October 7, 2005	Kitt Peak	Spacewatch	·	2.7 km	MPC · JPL
261163	2005 TK_{101}	—	October 7, 2005	Catalina	CSS	KOR	1.8 km	MPC · JPL
261164	2005 TJ_{102}	—	October 7, 2005	Mount Lemmon	Mount Lemmon Survey	HYG	3.1 km	MPC · JPL
261165	2005 TW_{102}	—	October 7, 2005	Mount Lemmon	Mount Lemmon Survey	KOR	1.7 km	MPC · JPL
261166	2005 TJ_{103}	—	October 8, 2005	Bergisch Gladbach	W. Bickel	615	1.9 km	MPC · JPL
261167	2005 TS_{104}	—	October 8, 2005	Catalina	CSS	·	2.6 km	MPC · JPL
261168	2005 TZ_{104}	—	October 8, 2005	Socorro	LINEAR	·	3.7 km	MPC · JPL
261169	2005 TK_{108}	—	October 7, 2005	Kitt Peak	Spacewatch	·	2.3 km	MPC · JPL
261170	2005 TG_{112}	—	October 7, 2005	Kitt Peak	Spacewatch	·	1.4 km	MPC · JPL
261171	2005 TQ_{113}	—	October 7, 2005	Kitt Peak	Spacewatch	PAD	1.8 km	MPC · JPL
261172	2005 TT_{113}	—	October 7, 2005	Kitt Peak	Spacewatch	KON	3.6 km	MPC · JPL
261173	2005 TH_{114}	—	October 7, 2005	Kitt Peak	Spacewatch	KOR	1.4 km	MPC · JPL
261174	2005 TX_{114}	—	October 7, 2005	Kitt Peak	Spacewatch	·	2.9 km	MPC · JPL
261175	2005 TY_{124}	—	October 7, 2005	Kitt Peak	Spacewatch	AGN	1.6 km	MPC · JPL
261176	2005 TX_{126}	—	October 7, 2005	Kitt Peak	Spacewatch	·	1.8 km	MPC · JPL
261177	2005 TD_{127}	—	October 7, 2005	Kitt Peak	Spacewatch	KOR	1.8 km	MPC · JPL
261178	2005 TF_{128}	—	October 7, 2005	Kitt Peak	Spacewatch	KOR	1.5 km	MPC · JPL
261179	2005 TC_{130}	—	October 7, 2005	Kitt Peak	Spacewatch	·	3.1 km	MPC · JPL
261180	2005 TR_{130}	—	October 7, 2005	Kitt Peak	Spacewatch	·	3.1 km	MPC · JPL
261181	2005 TY_{130}	—	October 7, 2005	Kitt Peak	Spacewatch	·	2.7 km	MPC · JPL
261182	2005 TS_{131}	—	October 7, 2005	Kitt Peak	Spacewatch	·	4.3 km	MPC · JPL
261183	2005 TL_{135}	—	October 6, 2005	Kitt Peak	Spacewatch	·	2.5 km	MPC · JPL
261184	2005 TN_{135}	—	October 6, 2005	Kitt Peak	Spacewatch	·	1.2 km	MPC · JPL
261185	2005 TT_{136}	—	October 6, 2005	Kitt Peak	Spacewatch	·	1.8 km	MPC · JPL
261186	2005 TX_{136}	—	October 6, 2005	Kitt Peak	Spacewatch	·	2.1 km	MPC · JPL
261187	2005 TS_{138}	—	October 8, 2005	Kitt Peak	Spacewatch	·	2.4 km	MPC · JPL
261188	2005 TL_{139}	—	October 8, 2005	Kitt Peak	Spacewatch	·	2.0 km	MPC · JPL
261189	2005 TY_{141}	—	October 8, 2005	Kitt Peak	Spacewatch	CYB	5.5 km	MPC · JPL
261190	2005 TT_{144}	—	October 8, 2005	Kitt Peak	Spacewatch	·	5.4 km	MPC · JPL
261191	2005 TN_{149}	—	October 8, 2005	Kitt Peak	Spacewatch	·	1.8 km	MPC · JPL
261192	2005 TW_{150}	—	October 8, 2005	Kitt Peak	Spacewatch	HOF	3.1 km	MPC · JPL
261193	2005 TD_{152}	—	October 11, 2005	Kitt Peak	Spacewatch	·	1.4 km	MPC · JPL
261194	2005 TQ_{154}	—	October 9, 2005	Kitt Peak	Spacewatch	·	1.9 km	MPC · JPL
261195	2005 TT_{156}	—	October 9, 2005	Kitt Peak	Spacewatch	·	2.2 km	MPC · JPL
261196	2005 TV_{159}	—	October 9, 2005	Kitt Peak	Spacewatch	·	3.5 km	MPC · JPL
261197	2005 TJ_{161}	—	October 9, 2005	Kitt Peak	Spacewatch	AGN	1.3 km	MPC · JPL
261198	2005 TH_{162}	—	October 9, 2005	Kitt Peak	Spacewatch	·	1.8 km	MPC · JPL
261199	2005 TV_{164}	—	October 9, 2005	Kitt Peak	Spacewatch	·	3.3 km	MPC · JPL
261200	2005 TK_{165}	—	October 9, 2005	Kitt Peak	Spacewatch	·	2.2 km	MPC · JPL

== 261201–261300 ==
back to top

Designation			Discovery			Properties		Ref
Permanent	Provisional	Named after	Date	Site	Discoverer(s)	Category	Diam.	Ref
261201	2005 TH_{167}	—	October 9, 2005	Kitt Peak	Spacewatch	KOR	1.3 km	MPC · JPL
261202	2005 TZ_{169}	—	October 10, 2005	Catalina	CSS	·	4.9 km	MPC · JPL
261203	2005 TJ_{171}	—	October 10, 2005	Anderson Mesa	LONEOS	·	3.8 km	MPC · JPL
261204	2005 TO_{171}	—	October 10, 2005	Catalina	CSS	·	2.1 km	MPC · JPL
261205	2005 TO_{178}	—	October 1, 2005	Mount Lemmon	Mount Lemmon Survey	HOF	2.7 km	MPC · JPL
261206	2005 TB_{182}	—	October 2, 2005	Mount Lemmon	Mount Lemmon Survey	·	1.7 km	MPC · JPL
261207	2005 TV_{185}	—	October 6, 2005	Mount Lemmon	Mount Lemmon Survey	·	2.1 km	MPC · JPL
261208	2005 TR_{187}	—	October 7, 2005	Socorro	LINEAR	·	2.1 km	MPC · JPL
261209	2005 TA_{189}	—	October 13, 2005	Kitt Peak	Spacewatch	·	1.7 km	MPC · JPL
261210	2005 TF_{191}	—	October 1, 2005	Anderson Mesa	LONEOS	AGN	1.7 km	MPC · JPL
261211	2005 TQ_{194}	—	October 9, 2005	Kitt Peak	Spacewatch	·	3.1 km	MPC · JPL
261212	2005 TY_{194}	—	October 3, 2005	Catalina	CSS	·	1.6 km	MPC · JPL
261213	2005 UR_{4}	—	October 26, 2005	Socorro	LINEAR	HNS	1.9 km	MPC · JPL
261214	2005 UO_{7}	—	October 26, 2005	Ottmarsheim	C. Rinner	·	2.2 km	MPC · JPL
261215	2005 UJ_{19}	—	October 22, 2005	Catalina	CSS	AGN	1.7 km	MPC · JPL
261216	2005 UT_{19}	—	October 22, 2005	Kitt Peak	Spacewatch	KOR	1.7 km	MPC · JPL
261217	2005 UF_{22}	—	October 23, 2005	Kitt Peak	Spacewatch	·	2.6 km	MPC · JPL
261218	2005 UL_{22}	—	October 23, 2005	Kitt Peak	Spacewatch	HOF	2.8 km	MPC · JPL
261219	2005 UN_{24}	—	October 23, 2005	Kitt Peak	Spacewatch	·	2.0 km	MPC · JPL
261220	2005 UA_{25}	—	October 23, 2005	Kitt Peak	Spacewatch	KOR	1.3 km	MPC · JPL
261221	2005 UN_{25}	—	October 23, 2005	Kitt Peak	Spacewatch	·	2.1 km	MPC · JPL
261222	2005 UF_{26}	—	October 23, 2005	Kitt Peak	Spacewatch	·	1.8 km	MPC · JPL
261223	2005 UO_{26}	—	October 23, 2005	Kitt Peak	Spacewatch	THM	2.6 km	MPC · JPL
261224	2005 UZ_{26}	—	October 23, 2005	Catalina	CSS	·	2.3 km	MPC · JPL
261225	2005 UU_{27}	—	October 23, 2005	Catalina	CSS	·	4.8 km	MPC · JPL
261226	2005 UQ_{30}	—	October 24, 2005	Kitt Peak	Spacewatch	·	1.5 km	MPC · JPL
261227	2005 UV_{30}	—	October 24, 2005	Kitt Peak	Spacewatch	·	1.8 km	MPC · JPL
261228	2005 UY_{32}	—	October 24, 2005	Kitt Peak	Spacewatch	AST	2.1 km	MPC · JPL
261229	2005 UF_{35}	—	October 24, 2005	Kitt Peak	Spacewatch	·	2.0 km	MPC · JPL
261230	2005 UA_{37}	—	October 24, 2005	Kitt Peak	Spacewatch	AGN	1.1 km	MPC · JPL
261231	2005 UH_{37}	—	October 24, 2005	Kitt Peak	Spacewatch	·	3.5 km	MPC · JPL
261232	2005 UE_{39}	—	October 24, 2005	Kitt Peak	Spacewatch	·	2.2 km	MPC · JPL
261233	2005 UZ_{39}	—	October 24, 2005	Kitt Peak	Spacewatch	·	3.7 km	MPC · JPL
261234	2005 UY_{43}	—	October 22, 2005	Catalina	CSS	AGN	1.4 km	MPC · JPL
261235	2005 UC_{46}	—	October 22, 2005	Kitt Peak	Spacewatch	·	1.9 km	MPC · JPL
261236	2005 UK_{47}	—	October 22, 2005	Kitt Peak	Spacewatch	·	3.2 km	MPC · JPL
261237	2005 UZ_{48}	—	October 23, 2005	Catalina	CSS	·	2.5 km	MPC · JPL
261238	2005 UU_{49}	—	October 23, 2005	Catalina	CSS	·	4.1 km	MPC · JPL
261239	2005 UG_{50}	—	October 23, 2005	Catalina	CSS	·	2.5 km	MPC · JPL
261240	2005 UP_{51}	—	October 23, 2005	Catalina	CSS	·	4.3 km	MPC · JPL
261241	2005 UU_{51}	—	October 23, 2005	Catalina	CSS	·	2.0 km	MPC · JPL
261242	2005 UV_{52}	—	October 23, 2005	Catalina	CSS	HYG	4.9 km	MPC · JPL
261243	2005 UX_{52}	—	October 23, 2005	Catalina	CSS	AGN	1.5 km	MPC · JPL
261244	2005 UB_{54}	—	October 23, 2005	Catalina	CSS	HOF	3.0 km	MPC · JPL
261245	2005 UL_{59}	—	October 25, 2005	Kitt Peak	Spacewatch	·	1.6 km	MPC · JPL
261246	2005 UA_{60}	—	October 25, 2005	Anderson Mesa	LONEOS	WIT	1.6 km	MPC · JPL
261247	2005 UZ_{63}	—	October 25, 2005	Mount Lemmon	Mount Lemmon Survey	·	1.8 km	MPC · JPL
261248	2005 UT_{67}	—	October 22, 2005	Palomar	NEAT	·	2.5 km	MPC · JPL
261249	2005 UR_{72}	—	October 23, 2005	Palomar	NEAT	·	3.0 km	MPC · JPL
261250	2005 UP_{75}	—	October 24, 2005	Palomar	NEAT	·	2.2 km	MPC · JPL
261251	2005 UW_{80}	—	October 25, 2005	Catalina	CSS	·	5.6 km	MPC · JPL
261252	2005 UW_{81}	—	October 22, 2005	Kitt Peak	Spacewatch	·	1.5 km	MPC · JPL
261253	2005 UW_{82}	—	October 22, 2005	Kitt Peak	Spacewatch	·	2.1 km	MPC · JPL
261254	2005 UG_{83}	—	October 22, 2005	Kitt Peak	Spacewatch	·	1.9 km	MPC · JPL
261255	2005 UA_{85}	—	October 22, 2005	Kitt Peak	Spacewatch	·	2.9 km	MPC · JPL
261256	2005 UF_{86}	—	October 22, 2005	Kitt Peak	Spacewatch	·	2.6 km	MPC · JPL
261257	2005 UO_{86}	—	October 22, 2005	Kitt Peak	Spacewatch	·	4.2 km	MPC · JPL
261258	2005 UA_{87}	—	October 22, 2005	Kitt Peak	Spacewatch	·	2.2 km	MPC · JPL
261259	2005 UK_{88}	—	October 22, 2005	Kitt Peak	Spacewatch	·	2.7 km	MPC · JPL
261260	2005 UL_{91}	—	October 22, 2005	Kitt Peak	Spacewatch	·	2.4 km	MPC · JPL
261261	2005 UT_{94}	—	October 22, 2005	Kitt Peak	Spacewatch	·	1.7 km	MPC · JPL
261262	2005 UE_{98}	—	October 22, 2005	Kitt Peak	Spacewatch	·	1.7 km	MPC · JPL
261263	2005 UT_{98}	—	October 22, 2005	Kitt Peak	Spacewatch	·	4.5 km	MPC · JPL
261264	2005 UT_{101}	—	October 22, 2005	Kitt Peak	Spacewatch	·	2.5 km	MPC · JPL
261265	2005 UJ_{105}	—	October 22, 2005	Kitt Peak	Spacewatch	·	2.5 km	MPC · JPL
261266	2005 UN_{105}	—	October 22, 2005	Kitt Peak	Spacewatch	KOR	1.8 km	MPC · JPL
261267	2005 UC_{107}	—	October 22, 2005	Kitt Peak	Spacewatch	KOR	1.4 km	MPC · JPL
261268	2005 UZ_{107}	—	October 22, 2005	Kitt Peak	Spacewatch	·	3.4 km	MPC · JPL
261269	2005 UE_{113}	—	October 22, 2005	Kitt Peak	Spacewatch	·	2.4 km	MPC · JPL
261270	2005 UB_{115}	—	October 22, 2005	Palomar	NEAT	·	4.1 km	MPC · JPL
261271	2005 UQ_{120}	—	October 24, 2005	Kitt Peak	Spacewatch	·	3.9 km	MPC · JPL
261272	2005 UR_{124}	—	October 24, 2005	Kitt Peak	Spacewatch	·	2.3 km	MPC · JPL
261273	2005 UX_{125}	—	October 24, 2005	Kitt Peak	Spacewatch	·	2.2 km	MPC · JPL
261274	2005 UJ_{129}	—	October 24, 2005	Kitt Peak	Spacewatch	·	2.2 km	MPC · JPL
261275	2005 UY_{130}	—	October 24, 2005	Kitt Peak	Spacewatch	·	2.5 km	MPC · JPL
261276	2005 UT_{131}	—	October 24, 2005	Palomar	NEAT	·	5.9 km	MPC · JPL
261277	2005 UN_{133}	—	October 25, 2005	Mount Lemmon	Mount Lemmon Survey	·	2.4 km	MPC · JPL
261278	2005 UA_{134}	—	October 25, 2005	Kitt Peak	Spacewatch	·	2.1 km	MPC · JPL
261279	2005 UK_{135}	—	October 25, 2005	Kitt Peak	Spacewatch	·	4.4 km	MPC · JPL
261280	2005 UR_{135}	—	October 25, 2005	Mount Lemmon	Mount Lemmon Survey	EOS	1.8 km	MPC · JPL
261281	2005 UL_{142}	—	October 25, 2005	Catalina	CSS	·	2.4 km	MPC · JPL
261282	2005 UF_{143}	—	October 25, 2005	Mount Lemmon	Mount Lemmon Survey	AGN	1.3 km	MPC · JPL
261283	2005 UV_{145}	—	October 26, 2005	Kitt Peak	Spacewatch	·	5.8 km	MPC · JPL
261284	2005 UO_{146}	—	October 26, 2005	Kitt Peak	Spacewatch	·	1.7 km	MPC · JPL
261285	2005 UE_{149}	—	October 26, 2005	Kitt Peak	Spacewatch	·	2.2 km	MPC · JPL
261286	2005 UO_{149}	—	October 26, 2005	Kitt Peak	Spacewatch	·	4.1 km	MPC · JPL
261287	2005 UF_{153}	—	October 26, 2005	Kitt Peak	Spacewatch	·	1.9 km	MPC · JPL
261288	2005 UG_{153}	—	October 26, 2005	Kitt Peak	Spacewatch	KOR	1.6 km	MPC · JPL
261289	2005 UU_{153}	—	October 26, 2005	Kitt Peak	Spacewatch	·	2.1 km	MPC · JPL
261290	2005 UA_{156}	—	October 26, 2005	Palomar	NEAT	·	2.8 km	MPC · JPL
261291 Fucecchio	2005 UC_{159}	Fucecchio	October 31, 2005	Andrushivka	Andrushivka	·	1.9 km	MPC · JPL
261292	2005 UD_{162}	—	October 27, 2005	Socorro	LINEAR	·	2.2 km	MPC · JPL
261293	2005 UG_{162}	—	October 27, 2005	Socorro	LINEAR	·	3.3 km	MPC · JPL
261294	2005 UV_{170}	—	October 24, 2005	Kitt Peak	Spacewatch	(7744)	2.0 km	MPC · JPL
261295	2005 UK_{173}	—	October 24, 2005	Kitt Peak	Spacewatch	·	2.0 km	MPC · JPL
261296	2005 UF_{177}	—	October 24, 2005	Kitt Peak	Spacewatch	·	1.9 km	MPC · JPL
261297	2005 UR_{177}	—	October 24, 2005	Kitt Peak	Spacewatch	·	2.5 km	MPC · JPL
261298	2005 UP_{180}	—	October 24, 2005	Kitt Peak	Spacewatch	·	2.2 km	MPC · JPL
261299	2005 UK_{181}	—	October 24, 2005	Kitt Peak	Spacewatch	EOS	2.6 km	MPC · JPL
261300	2005 UN_{181}	—	October 24, 2005	Kitt Peak	Spacewatch	KOR	2.0 km	MPC · JPL

== 261301–261400 ==
back to top

Designation			Discovery			Properties		Ref
Permanent	Provisional	Named after	Date	Site	Discoverer(s)	Category	Diam.	Ref
261301	2005 UX_{181}	—	October 24, 2005	Kitt Peak	Spacewatch	KOR	1.5 km	MPC · JPL
261302	2005 UV_{182}	—	October 24, 2005	Kitt Peak	Spacewatch	·	2.5 km	MPC · JPL
261303	2005 UZ_{182}	—	October 24, 2005	Kitt Peak	Spacewatch	KOR	1.4 km	MPC · JPL
261304	2005 UJ_{185}	—	October 25, 2005	Mount Lemmon	Mount Lemmon Survey	KOR	1.4 km	MPC · JPL
261305	2005 US_{193}	—	October 22, 2005	Kitt Peak	Spacewatch	THM	2.4 km	MPC · JPL
261306	2005 UJ_{196}	—	October 24, 2005	Kitt Peak	Spacewatch	·	1.7 km	MPC · JPL
261307	2005 UN_{196}	—	October 24, 2005	Kitt Peak	Spacewatch	HOF	3.1 km	MPC · JPL
261308	2005 UZ_{197}	—	October 25, 2005	Kitt Peak	Spacewatch	·	2.0 km	MPC · JPL
261309	2005 UJ_{200}	—	October 25, 2005	Kitt Peak	Spacewatch	KOR	1.7 km	MPC · JPL
261310	2005 UM_{200}	—	October 25, 2005	Kitt Peak	Spacewatch	·	3.9 km	MPC · JPL
261311	2005 UQ_{202}	—	October 25, 2005	Kitt Peak	Spacewatch	AGN	1.7 km	MPC · JPL
261312	2005 UR_{203}	—	October 25, 2005	Mount Lemmon	Mount Lemmon Survey	·	1.9 km	MPC · JPL
261313	2005 UV_{203}	—	October 25, 2005	Mount Lemmon	Mount Lemmon Survey	·	2.2 km	MPC · JPL
261314	2005 UA_{204}	—	October 25, 2005	Mount Lemmon	Mount Lemmon Survey	·	1.8 km	MPC · JPL
261315	2005 UN_{204}	—	October 25, 2005	Mount Lemmon	Mount Lemmon Survey	·	2.4 km	MPC · JPL
261316	2005 UA_{205}	—	October 26, 2005	Mount Lemmon	Mount Lemmon Survey	(12739)	1.7 km	MPC · JPL
261317	2005 UB_{205}	—	October 26, 2005	Mount Lemmon	Mount Lemmon Survey	EOS	1.7 km	MPC · JPL
261318	2005 UC_{208}	—	October 27, 2005	Kitt Peak	Spacewatch	·	1.9 km	MPC · JPL
261319	2005 UW_{211}	—	October 27, 2005	Kitt Peak	Spacewatch	·	2.6 km	MPC · JPL
261320	2005 UX_{214}	—	October 27, 2005	Palomar	NEAT	·	2.2 km	MPC · JPL
261321	2005 UH_{217}	—	October 27, 2005	Catalina	CSS	·	1.8 km	MPC · JPL
261322	2005 UQ_{218}	—	October 25, 2005	Kitt Peak	Spacewatch	·	2.5 km	MPC · JPL
261323	2005 UR_{220}	—	October 25, 2005	Kitt Peak	Spacewatch	·	2.1 km	MPC · JPL
261324	2005 UX_{220}	—	October 25, 2005	Kitt Peak	Spacewatch	·	4.7 km	MPC · JPL
261325	2005 UN_{223}	—	October 25, 2005	Kitt Peak	Spacewatch	·	4.6 km	MPC · JPL
261326	2005 UX_{230}	—	October 25, 2005	Mount Lemmon	Mount Lemmon Survey	·	2.7 km	MPC · JPL
261327	2005 UR_{231}	—	October 25, 2005	Mount Lemmon	Mount Lemmon Survey	·	2.5 km	MPC · JPL
261328	2005 UO_{232}	—	October 25, 2005	Mount Lemmon	Mount Lemmon Survey	·	3.1 km	MPC · JPL
261329	2005 UD_{240}	—	October 25, 2005	Kitt Peak	Spacewatch	·	2.4 km	MPC · JPL
261330	2005 UU_{240}	—	October 25, 2005	Kitt Peak	Spacewatch	·	2.8 km	MPC · JPL
261331	2005 UL_{242}	—	October 25, 2005	Kitt Peak	Spacewatch	·	4.2 km	MPC · JPL
261332	2005 UP_{244}	—	October 25, 2005	Kitt Peak	Spacewatch	·	2.8 km	MPC · JPL
261333	2005 UJ_{246}	—	October 27, 2005	Kitt Peak	Spacewatch	·	2.7 km	MPC · JPL
261334	2005 US_{246}	—	October 27, 2005	Mount Lemmon	Mount Lemmon Survey	KOR	1.8 km	MPC · JPL
261335	2005 UQ_{247}	—	October 28, 2005	Mount Lemmon	Mount Lemmon Survey	·	1.8 km	MPC · JPL
261336	2005 UC_{250}	—	October 23, 2005	Palomar	NEAT	·	3.0 km	MPC · JPL
261337	2005 UR_{252}	—	October 26, 2005	Kitt Peak	Spacewatch	EOS	3.1 km	MPC · JPL
261338	2005 UB_{255}	—	October 24, 2005	Kitt Peak	Spacewatch	·	2.2 km	MPC · JPL
261339	2005 UX_{256}	—	October 25, 2005	Kitt Peak	Spacewatch	·	3.2 km	MPC · JPL
261340	2005 UN_{260}	—	October 25, 2005	Kitt Peak	Spacewatch	·	3.2 km	MPC · JPL
261341	2005 UC_{261}	—	October 25, 2005	Mount Lemmon	Mount Lemmon Survey	THM	2.4 km	MPC · JPL
261342	2005 UE_{265}	—	October 27, 2005	Kitt Peak	Spacewatch	·	2.0 km	MPC · JPL
261343	2005 UP_{265}	—	October 27, 2005	Kitt Peak	Spacewatch	·	2.0 km	MPC · JPL
261344	2005 UT_{265}	—	October 27, 2005	Kitt Peak	Spacewatch	·	2.3 km	MPC · JPL
261345	2005 UB_{275}	—	October 23, 2005	Palomar	NEAT	ADE	3.8 km	MPC · JPL
261346	2005 UO_{276}	—	October 24, 2005	Kitt Peak	Spacewatch	KOR	1.4 km	MPC · JPL
261347	2005 UP_{276}	—	October 24, 2005	Kitt Peak	Spacewatch	·	2.1 km	MPC · JPL
261348	2005 UA_{280}	—	October 24, 2005	Kitt Peak	Spacewatch	THM	2.3 km	MPC · JPL
261349	2005 UY_{283}	—	October 26, 2005	Kitt Peak	Spacewatch	·	1.7 km	MPC · JPL
261350	2005 UF_{285}	—	October 26, 2005	Kitt Peak	Spacewatch	·	2.4 km	MPC · JPL
261351	2005 UB_{289}	—	October 26, 2005	Kitt Peak	Spacewatch	·	4.5 km	MPC · JPL
261352	2005 UZ_{289}	—	October 26, 2005	Kitt Peak	Spacewatch	·	2.4 km	MPC · JPL
261353	2005 UK_{290}	—	October 26, 2005	Kitt Peak	Spacewatch	·	2.2 km	MPC · JPL
261354	2005 UC_{292}	—	October 26, 2005	Kitt Peak	Spacewatch	·	2.9 km	MPC · JPL
261355	2005 UY_{294}	—	October 26, 2005	Kitt Peak	Spacewatch	·	2.8 km	MPC · JPL
261356	2005 UV_{304}	—	October 26, 2005	Kitt Peak	Spacewatch	·	3.7 km	MPC · JPL
261357	2005 US_{312}	—	October 29, 2005	Catalina	CSS	·	2.6 km	MPC · JPL
261358	2005 UP_{313}	—	October 27, 2005	Socorro	LINEAR	·	3.4 km	MPC · JPL
261359	2005 UE_{314}	—	October 28, 2005	Catalina	CSS	EOS	3.3 km	MPC · JPL
261360	2005 UU_{315}	—	October 25, 2005	Kitt Peak	Spacewatch	KOR	1.6 km	MPC · JPL
261361	2005 UF_{319}	—	October 27, 2005	Kitt Peak	Spacewatch	HOF	3.3 km	MPC · JPL
261362	2005 UQ_{319}	—	October 27, 2005	Kitt Peak	Spacewatch	·	3.4 km	MPC · JPL
261363	2005 UW_{324}	—	October 29, 2005	Mount Lemmon	Mount Lemmon Survey	·	2.9 km	MPC · JPL
261364	2005 UC_{327}	—	October 29, 2005	Catalina	CSS	·	2.2 km	MPC · JPL
261365	2005 UL_{329}	—	October 28, 2005	Mount Lemmon	Mount Lemmon Survey	·	1.8 km	MPC · JPL
261366	2005 UY_{329}	—	October 28, 2005	Kitt Peak	Spacewatch	·	2.7 km	MPC · JPL
261367	2005 UN_{337}	—	October 31, 2005	Kitt Peak	Spacewatch	·	4.4 km	MPC · JPL
261368	2005 UX_{341}	—	October 31, 2005	Mount Lemmon	Mount Lemmon Survey	·	2.8 km	MPC · JPL
261369	2005 UZ_{341}	—	October 31, 2005	Mount Lemmon	Mount Lemmon Survey	·	2.5 km	MPC · JPL
261370	2005 UR_{342}	—	October 28, 2005	Catalina	CSS	·	1.6 km	MPC · JPL
261371	2005 UU_{350}	—	October 29, 2005	Catalina	CSS	·	2.9 km	MPC · JPL
261372	2005 UF_{353}	—	October 29, 2005	Catalina	CSS	BRA	2.3 km	MPC · JPL
261373	2005 UT_{353}	—	October 29, 2005	Catalina	CSS	EUP	5.7 km	MPC · JPL
261374	2005 UA_{354}	—	October 29, 2005	Kitt Peak	Spacewatch	EUP	5.4 km	MPC · JPL
261375	2005 UW_{356}	—	October 30, 2005	Mount Lemmon	Mount Lemmon Survey	·	4.2 km	MPC · JPL
261376	2005 UN_{357}	—	October 30, 2005	Catalina	CSS	·	3.3 km	MPC · JPL
261377	2005 UJ_{358}	—	October 24, 2005	Kitt Peak	Spacewatch	CYB	5.1 km	MPC · JPL
261378	2005 UH_{363}	—	October 27, 2005	Kitt Peak	Spacewatch	·	2.9 km	MPC · JPL
261379	2005 UW_{366}	—	October 27, 2005	Kitt Peak	Spacewatch	HOF	3.4 km	MPC · JPL
261380	2005 UC_{368}	—	October 27, 2005	Kitt Peak	Spacewatch	·	2.6 km	MPC · JPL
261381	2005 UP_{369}	—	October 27, 2005	Kitt Peak	Spacewatch	EOS	2.2 km	MPC · JPL
261382	2005 UB_{370}	—	October 27, 2005	Kitt Peak	Spacewatch	·	1.8 km	MPC · JPL
261383	2005 UX_{372}	—	October 27, 2005	Kitt Peak	Spacewatch	·	2.5 km	MPC · JPL
261384	2005 UR_{375}	—	October 27, 2005	Kitt Peak	Spacewatch	·	2.7 km	MPC · JPL
261385	2005 UF_{387}	—	October 30, 2005	Mount Lemmon	Mount Lemmon Survey	·	2.1 km	MPC · JPL
261386	2005 UE_{388}	—	October 26, 2005	Kitt Peak	Spacewatch	·	1.8 km	MPC · JPL
261387	2005 UF_{388}	—	October 26, 2005	Kitt Peak	Spacewatch	·	2.8 km	MPC · JPL
261388	2005 UF_{395}	—	October 30, 2005	Mount Lemmon	Mount Lemmon Survey	·	2.5 km	MPC · JPL
261389	2005 UK_{402}	—	October 28, 2005	Kitt Peak	Spacewatch	·	2.7 km	MPC · JPL
261390	2005 UR_{403}	—	October 29, 2005	Mount Lemmon	Mount Lemmon Survey	·	2.2 km	MPC · JPL
261391	2005 UH_{404}	—	October 29, 2005	Mount Lemmon	Mount Lemmon Survey	·	1.6 km	MPC · JPL
261392	2005 UJ_{413}	—	October 31, 2005	Kitt Peak	Spacewatch	EUP	5.0 km	MPC · JPL
261393	2005 UD_{415}	—	October 25, 2005	Kitt Peak	Spacewatch	EOS	2.1 km	MPC · JPL
261394	2005 UF_{415}	—	October 25, 2005	Kitt Peak	Spacewatch	·	1.5 km	MPC · JPL
261395	2005 UN_{438}	—	October 28, 2005	Kitt Peak	Spacewatch	·	3.0 km	MPC · JPL
261396	2005 US_{439}	—	October 29, 2005	Catalina	CSS	·	3.2 km	MPC · JPL
261397	2005 UW_{439}	—	October 29, 2005	Catalina	CSS	(18466)	3.4 km	MPC · JPL
261398	2005 UG_{440}	—	October 29, 2005	Catalina	CSS	·	2.6 km	MPC · JPL
261399	2005 UR_{441}	—	October 29, 2005	Mount Lemmon	Mount Lemmon Survey	·	2.0 km	MPC · JPL
261400	2005 UG_{445}	—	October 31, 2005	Socorro	LINEAR	·	3.4 km	MPC · JPL

== 261401–261500 ==
back to top

Designation			Discovery			Properties		Ref
Permanent	Provisional	Named after	Date	Site	Discoverer(s)	Category	Diam.	Ref
261401	2005 UH_{451}	—	October 27, 2005	Mount Lemmon	Mount Lemmon Survey	·	2.1 km	MPC · JPL
261402	2005 UE_{454}	—	October 23, 2005	Catalina	CSS	·	2.3 km	MPC · JPL
261403	2005 UT_{455}	—	October 29, 2005	Catalina	CSS	EOS	2.7 km	MPC · JPL
261404	2005 UD_{459}	—	October 31, 2005	Mount Lemmon	Mount Lemmon Survey	·	1.8 km	MPC · JPL
261405	2005 UK_{459}	—	October 27, 2005	Kitt Peak	Spacewatch	(5)	1.5 km	MPC · JPL
261406	2005 UP_{467}	—	October 30, 2005	Kitt Peak	Spacewatch	·	2.6 km	MPC · JPL
261407	2005 UM_{476}	—	October 24, 2005	Kitt Peak	Spacewatch	·	2.3 km	MPC · JPL
261408	2005 US_{477}	—	October 26, 2005	Palomar	NEAT	EUP	4.0 km	MPC · JPL
261409	2005 UZ_{477}	—	October 27, 2005	Kitt Peak	Spacewatch	THM	2.9 km	MPC · JPL
261410	2005 UD_{478}	—	October 27, 2005	Anderson Mesa	LONEOS	·	2.6 km	MPC · JPL
261411	2005 UD_{481}	—	October 25, 2005	Socorro	LINEAR	·	2.6 km	MPC · JPL
261412	2005 UY_{482}	—	October 22, 2005	Catalina	CSS	·	3.9 km	MPC · JPL
261413	2005 UZ_{482}	—	October 22, 2005	Catalina	CSS	AGN	1.5 km	MPC · JPL
261414	2005 UN_{483}	—	October 22, 2005	Catalina	CSS	·	2.5 km	MPC · JPL
261415	2005 UU_{486}	—	October 23, 2005	Catalina	CSS	·	2.1 km	MPC · JPL
261416	2005 UG_{487}	—	October 23, 2005	Catalina	CSS	·	3.0 km	MPC · JPL
261417	2005 UJ_{489}	—	October 23, 2005	Catalina	CSS	·	5.7 km	MPC · JPL
261418	2005 UJ_{490}	—	October 23, 2005	Catalina	CSS	·	2.1 km	MPC · JPL
261419	2005 UM_{494}	—	October 25, 2005	Catalina	CSS	·	3.0 km	MPC · JPL
261420	2005 UJ_{498}	—	October 27, 2005	Catalina	CSS	EOS	2.9 km	MPC · JPL
261421	2005 UK_{499}	—	October 27, 2005	Catalina	CSS	EOS	2.1 km	MPC · JPL
261422	2005 UA_{509}	—	October 25, 2005	Kitt Peak	Spacewatch	·	2.3 km	MPC · JPL
261423	2005 UF_{509}	—	October 26, 2005	Anderson Mesa	LONEOS	·	2.7 km	MPC · JPL
261424	2005 UW_{509}	—	October 22, 2005	Kitt Peak	Spacewatch	KOR	1.6 km	MPC · JPL
261425	2005 UN_{510}	—	October 25, 2005	Mount Lemmon	Mount Lemmon Survey	EOS	2.5 km	MPC · JPL
261426	2005 UK_{514}	—	October 20, 2005	Apache Point	A. C. Becker	EOS	1.9 km	MPC · JPL
261427	2005 UN_{514}	—	October 20, 2005	Apache Point	A. C. Becker	KOR	1.4 km	MPC · JPL
261428	2005 UR_{514}	—	October 20, 2005	Apache Point	A. C. Becker	·	2.2 km	MPC · JPL
261429	2005 UY_{515}	—	October 22, 2005	Apache Point	A. C. Becker	·	4.1 km	MPC · JPL
261430	2005 UD_{516}	—	October 25, 2005	Mount Lemmon	Mount Lemmon Survey	·	2.8 km	MPC · JPL
261431	2005 UJ_{522}	—	October 27, 2005	Apache Point	A. C. Becker	·	2.1 km	MPC · JPL
261432	2005 UU_{522}	—	October 27, 2005	Apache Point	A. C. Becker	·	2.0 km	MPC · JPL
261433	2005 UF_{523}	—	October 27, 2005	Apache Point	A. C. Becker	·	1.9 km	MPC · JPL
261434	2005 UJ_{524}	—	October 27, 2005	Apache Point	A. C. Becker	·	2.9 km	MPC · JPL
261435	2005 UV_{524}	—	October 30, 2005	Mount Lemmon	Mount Lemmon Survey	·	3.1 km	MPC · JPL
261436	2005 UK_{527}	—	October 25, 2005	Mount Lemmon	Mount Lemmon Survey	·	2.4 km	MPC · JPL
261437	2005 UO_{530}	—	October 28, 2005	Kitt Peak	Spacewatch	·	4.3 km	MPC · JPL
261438	2005 VD_{3}	—	November 4, 2005	Goodricke-Pigott	R. A. Tucker	WIT	1.6 km	MPC · JPL
261439	2005 VL_{6}	—	November 6, 2005	Kitt Peak	Spacewatch	·	3.1 km	MPC · JPL
261440	2005 VJ_{7}	—	November 12, 2005	Great Shefford	Birtwhistle, P.	·	2.2 km	MPC · JPL
261441	2005 VY_{7}	—	November 1, 2005	Kitt Peak	Spacewatch	NEM	2.6 km	MPC · JPL
261442	2005 VS_{13}	—	November 3, 2005	Catalina	CSS	·	2.0 km	MPC · JPL
261443	2005 VM_{14}	—	November 3, 2005	Socorro	LINEAR	·	2.6 km	MPC · JPL
261444	2005 VR_{23}	—	November 1, 2005	Kitt Peak	Spacewatch	·	2.7 km	MPC · JPL
261445	2005 VA_{27}	—	November 3, 2005	Mount Lemmon	Mount Lemmon Survey	KOR	1.4 km	MPC · JPL
261446	2005 VS_{28}	—	November 4, 2005	Kitt Peak	Spacewatch	VER	3.1 km	MPC · JPL
261447	2005 VE_{30}	—	November 4, 2005	Kitt Peak	Spacewatch	KOR	1.9 km	MPC · JPL
261448	2005 VO_{30}	—	November 4, 2005	Kitt Peak	Spacewatch	·	4.2 km	MPC · JPL
261449	2005 VH_{31}	—	November 4, 2005	Kitt Peak	Spacewatch	EOS	2.5 km	MPC · JPL
261450	2005 VX_{39}	—	November 4, 2005	Catalina	CSS	·	3.1 km	MPC · JPL
261451	2005 VW_{42}	—	November 4, 2005	Mount Lemmon	Mount Lemmon Survey	·	3.3 km	MPC · JPL
261452	2005 VV_{43}	—	November 3, 2005	Kitt Peak	Spacewatch	·	1.4 km	MPC · JPL
261453	2005 VB_{49}	—	November 1, 2005	Catalina	CSS	·	2.7 km	MPC · JPL
261454	2005 VY_{50}	—	November 3, 2005	Catalina	CSS	·	4.8 km	MPC · JPL
261455	2005 VS_{52}	—	November 3, 2005	Mount Lemmon	Mount Lemmon Survey	·	2.9 km	MPC · JPL
261456	2005 VB_{60}	—	November 5, 2005	Anderson Mesa	LONEOS	·	1.9 km	MPC · JPL
261457	2005 VC_{68}	—	November 1, 2005	Mount Lemmon	Mount Lemmon Survey	(260) · CYB	4.8 km	MPC · JPL
261458	2005 VK_{68}	—	November 1, 2005	Mount Lemmon	Mount Lemmon Survey	·	2.2 km	MPC · JPL
261459	2005 VP_{69}	—	November 1, 2005	Mount Lemmon	Mount Lemmon Survey	·	2.8 km	MPC · JPL
261460	2005 VB_{72}	—	November 1, 2005	Mount Lemmon	Mount Lemmon Survey	·	2.3 km	MPC · JPL
261461	2005 VQ_{72}	—	November 1, 2005	Mount Lemmon	Mount Lemmon Survey	·	3.2 km	MPC · JPL
261462	2005 VN_{73}	—	November 1, 2005	Mount Lemmon	Mount Lemmon Survey	·	3.9 km	MPC · JPL
261463	2005 VS_{76}	—	November 4, 2005	Catalina	CSS	H	860 m	MPC · JPL
261464	2005 VM_{77}	—	November 5, 2005	Kitt Peak	Spacewatch	VER	4.0 km	MPC · JPL
261465	2005 VG_{82}	—	November 9, 2005	Catalina	CSS	·	2.4 km	MPC · JPL
261466	2005 VB_{92}	—	November 6, 2005	Mount Lemmon	Mount Lemmon Survey	AGN	1.5 km	MPC · JPL
261467	2005 VU_{92}	—	November 6, 2005	Mount Lemmon	Mount Lemmon Survey	·	3.1 km	MPC · JPL
261468	2005 VY_{101}	—	November 1, 2005	Anderson Mesa	LONEOS	·	2.9 km	MPC · JPL
261469	2005 VJ_{108}	—	November 6, 2005	Kitt Peak	Spacewatch	TEL	1.4 km	MPC · JPL
261470	2005 VQ_{109}	—	November 6, 2005	Mount Lemmon	Mount Lemmon Survey	·	1.7 km	MPC · JPL
261471	2005 VZ_{110}	—	November 6, 2005	Mount Lemmon	Mount Lemmon Survey	EOS ·	3.7 km	MPC · JPL
261472	2005 VG_{113}	—	November 10, 2005	Catalina	CSS	·	2.9 km	MPC · JPL
261473	2005 VQ_{114}	—	November 10, 2005	Campo Imperatore	CINEOS	·	2.6 km	MPC · JPL
261474	2005 VO_{116}	—	November 11, 2005	Kitt Peak	Spacewatch	·	2.3 km	MPC · JPL
261475	2005 VX_{116}	—	August 15, 2004	Siding Spring	SSS	·	5.9 km	MPC · JPL
261476	2005 VY_{117}	—	November 12, 2005	Catalina	CSS	·	4.4 km	MPC · JPL
261477	2005 VU_{119}	—	November 4, 2005	Kitt Peak	Spacewatch	·	4.5 km	MPC · JPL
261478	2005 VZ_{120}	—	November 12, 2005	Catalina	CSS	·	2.7 km	MPC · JPL
261479	2005 VH_{122}	—	November 6, 2005	Anderson Mesa	LONEOS	·	4.5 km	MPC · JPL
261480	2005 VJ_{124}	—	November 6, 2005	Mount Lemmon	Mount Lemmon Survey	·	2.9 km	MPC · JPL
261481	2005 VS_{124}	—	November 3, 2005	Catalina	CSS	·	2.7 km	MPC · JPL
261482	2005 VY_{124}	—	November 6, 2005	Mount Lemmon	Mount Lemmon Survey	·	4.4 km	MPC · JPL
261483	2005 VY_{125}	—	November 1, 2005	Apache Point	A. C. Becker	·	4.7 km	MPC · JPL
261484	2005 VV_{130}	—	November 1, 2005	Apache Point	A. C. Becker	·	2.8 km	MPC · JPL
261485	2005 VC_{133}	—	November 1, 2005	Apache Point	A. C. Becker	·	4.4 km	MPC · JPL
261486	2005 VG_{134}	—	November 1, 2005	Mount Lemmon	Mount Lemmon Survey	·	2.3 km	MPC · JPL
261487	2005 VZ_{134}	—	November 1, 2005	Kitt Peak	Spacewatch	·	2.3 km	MPC · JPL
261488	2005 WN_{1}	—	November 21, 2005	Socorro	LINEAR	T_{j} (2.99) · EUP	6.7 km	MPC · JPL
261489	2005 WT_{1}	—	November 17, 2005	Palomar	NEAT	·	3.2 km	MPC · JPL
261490	2005 WV_{5}	—	November 21, 2005	Anderson Mesa	LONEOS	·	5.8 km	MPC · JPL
261491	2005 WW_{7}	—	November 21, 2005	Catalina	CSS	·	2.5 km	MPC · JPL
261492	2005 WB_{8}	—	November 21, 2005	Catalina	CSS	·	6.0 km	MPC · JPL
261493	2005 WT_{10}	—	November 22, 2005	Kitt Peak	Spacewatch	HYG	2.9 km	MPC · JPL
261494	2005 WM_{11}	—	November 22, 2005	Kitt Peak	Spacewatch	·	2.5 km	MPC · JPL
261495	2005 WJ_{15}	—	November 22, 2005	Kitt Peak	Spacewatch	·	2.1 km	MPC · JPL
261496	2005 WB_{16}	—	November 22, 2005	Kitt Peak	Spacewatch	·	2.5 km	MPC · JPL
261497	2005 WV_{17}	—	November 22, 2005	Kitt Peak	Spacewatch	·	3.2 km	MPC · JPL
261498	2005 WK_{20}	—	November 21, 2005	Kitt Peak	Spacewatch	·	2.4 km	MPC · JPL
261499	2005 WU_{21}	—	November 21, 2005	Kitt Peak	Spacewatch	·	3.7 km	MPC · JPL
261500	2005 WL_{28}	—	November 21, 2005	Kitt Peak	Spacewatch	EOS	2.8 km	MPC · JPL

== 261501–261600 ==
back to top

Designation			Discovery			Properties		Ref
Permanent	Provisional	Named after	Date	Site	Discoverer(s)	Category	Diam.	Ref
261501	2005 WO_{28}	—	November 21, 2005	Kitt Peak	Spacewatch	·	2.4 km	MPC · JPL
261502	2005 WG_{29}	—	November 21, 2005	Kitt Peak	Spacewatch	·	3.7 km	MPC · JPL
261503	2005 WY_{30}	—	November 21, 2005	Kitt Peak	Spacewatch	·	3.2 km	MPC · JPL
261504	2005 WX_{35}	—	November 22, 2005	Kitt Peak	Spacewatch	CYB	6.5 km	MPC · JPL
261505	2005 WN_{37}	—	November 22, 2005	Kitt Peak	Spacewatch	·	3.1 km	MPC · JPL
261506	2005 WG_{41}	—	November 21, 2005	Kitt Peak	Spacewatch	·	1.8 km	MPC · JPL
261507	2005 WX_{43}	—	November 21, 2005	Catalina	CSS	·	2.4 km	MPC · JPL
261508	2005 WA_{46}	—	November 22, 2005	Kitt Peak	Spacewatch	·	2.9 km	MPC · JPL
261509	2005 WE_{46}	—	November 22, 2005	Kitt Peak	Spacewatch	·	5.0 km	MPC · JPL
261510	2005 WY_{46}	—	November 25, 2005	Kitt Peak	Spacewatch	PAD	2.5 km	MPC · JPL
261511	2005 WJ_{51}	—	November 25, 2005	Kitt Peak	Spacewatch	·	2.8 km	MPC · JPL
261512	2005 WJ_{58}	—	November 25, 2005	Catalina	CSS	·	1.7 km	MPC · JPL
261513	2005 WJ_{60}	—	November 28, 2005	Socorro	LINEAR	·	2.3 km	MPC · JPL
261514	2005 WJ_{61}	—	November 25, 2005	Catalina	CSS	·	2.5 km	MPC · JPL
261515	2005 WC_{65}	—	November 20, 2005	Catalina	CSS	H	640 m	MPC · JPL
261516	2005 WH_{66}	—	November 22, 2005	Kitt Peak	Spacewatch	EOS	2.3 km	MPC · JPL
261517	2005 WL_{67}	—	November 22, 2005	Kitt Peak	Spacewatch	·	2.6 km	MPC · JPL
261518	2005 WW_{68}	—	November 25, 2005	Mount Lemmon	Mount Lemmon Survey	·	3.1 km	MPC · JPL
261519	2005 WP_{69}	—	November 26, 2005	Kitt Peak	Spacewatch	·	2.8 km	MPC · JPL
261520	2005 WO_{70}	—	November 26, 2005	Mount Lemmon	Mount Lemmon Survey	·	4.4 km	MPC · JPL
261521	2005 WP_{71}	—	November 21, 2005	Catalina	CSS	·	2.6 km	MPC · JPL
261522	2005 WN_{74}	—	November 28, 2005	Palomar	NEAT	EOS	2.6 km	MPC · JPL
261523	2005 WU_{75}	—	November 25, 2005	Kitt Peak	Spacewatch	·	2.1 km	MPC · JPL
261524	2005 WW_{80}	—	November 26, 2005	Mount Lemmon	Mount Lemmon Survey	·	2.1 km	MPC · JPL
261525	2005 WU_{81}	—	November 28, 2005	Socorro	LINEAR	·	2.9 km	MPC · JPL
261526	2005 WP_{82}	—	November 25, 2005	Mount Lemmon	Mount Lemmon Survey	·	2.5 km	MPC · JPL
261527	2005 WC_{84}	—	November 26, 2005	Mount Lemmon	Mount Lemmon Survey	·	2.7 km	MPC · JPL
261528	2005 WO_{86}	—	November 28, 2005	Mount Lemmon	Mount Lemmon Survey	·	3.0 km	MPC · JPL
261529	2005 WJ_{91}	—	November 28, 2005	Catalina	CSS	KOR	1.8 km	MPC · JPL
261530	2005 WN_{95}	—	November 26, 2005	Kitt Peak	Spacewatch	·	3.1 km	MPC · JPL
261531	2005 WM_{99}	—	November 28, 2005	Mount Lemmon	Mount Lemmon Survey	WIT	1.4 km	MPC · JPL
261532	2005 WT_{99}	—	November 28, 2005	Mount Lemmon	Mount Lemmon Survey	·	2.0 km	MPC · JPL
261533	2005 WK_{104}	—	November 28, 2005	Catalina	CSS	LIX	6.7 km	MPC · JPL
261534	2005 WF_{108}	—	November 28, 2005	Catalina	CSS	·	2.5 km	MPC · JPL
261535	2005 WE_{113}	—	November 25, 2005	Catalina	CSS	·	3.1 km	MPC · JPL
261536	2005 WW_{115}	—	November 30, 2005	Catalina	CSS	·	2.5 km	MPC · JPL
261537	2005 WG_{116}	—	November 30, 2005	Socorro	LINEAR	·	3.1 km	MPC · JPL
261538	2005 WW_{119}	—	November 29, 2005	Kitt Peak	Spacewatch	KOR	1.7 km	MPC · JPL
261539	2005 WR_{121}	—	November 30, 2005	Socorro	LINEAR	EOS	2.9 km	MPC · JPL
261540	2005 WM_{122}	—	November 25, 2005	Mount Lemmon	Mount Lemmon Survey	·	2.9 km	MPC · JPL
261541	2005 WL_{123}	—	November 25, 2005	Mount Lemmon	Mount Lemmon Survey	·	1.4 km	MPC · JPL
261542	2005 WH_{125}	—	November 25, 2005	Mount Lemmon	Mount Lemmon Survey	THM	2.4 km	MPC · JPL
261543	2005 WU_{131}	—	November 25, 2005	Mount Lemmon	Mount Lemmon Survey	·	2.3 km	MPC · JPL
261544	2005 WR_{133}	—	November 25, 2005	Mount Lemmon	Mount Lemmon Survey	·	2.4 km	MPC · JPL
261545	2005 WB_{135}	—	November 25, 2005	Mount Lemmon	Mount Lemmon Survey	·	5.4 km	MPC · JPL
261546	2005 WD_{136}	—	November 26, 2005	Kitt Peak	Spacewatch	·	3.1 km	MPC · JPL
261547	2005 WY_{138}	—	November 26, 2005	Mount Lemmon	Mount Lemmon Survey	·	2.7 km	MPC · JPL
261548	2005 WD_{141}	—	November 28, 2005	Mount Lemmon	Mount Lemmon Survey	·	2.5 km	MPC · JPL
261549	2005 WW_{141}	—	November 29, 2005	Mount Lemmon	Mount Lemmon Survey	KOR	2.3 km	MPC · JPL
261550	2005 WK_{148}	—	November 26, 2005	Catalina	CSS	·	3.1 km	MPC · JPL
261551	2005 WE_{149}	—	November 28, 2005	Kitt Peak	Spacewatch	EOS	2.3 km	MPC · JPL
261552	2005 WY_{150}	—	November 28, 2005	Socorro	LINEAR	EOS	2.7 km	MPC · JPL
261553	2005 WG_{152}	—	November 29, 2005	Palomar	NEAT	·	3.8 km	MPC · JPL
261554	2005 WQ_{152}	—	November 29, 2005	Kitt Peak	Spacewatch	·	2.3 km	MPC · JPL
261555	2005 WS_{152}	—	November 29, 2005	Kitt Peak	Spacewatch	·	2.0 km	MPC · JPL
261556	2005 WE_{154}	—	November 29, 2005	Socorro	LINEAR	·	2.6 km	MPC · JPL
261557	2005 WQ_{156}	—	November 30, 2005	Kitt Peak	Spacewatch	·	3.6 km	MPC · JPL
261558	2005 WM_{160}	—	November 28, 2005	Kitt Peak	Spacewatch	·	2.7 km	MPC · JPL
261559	2005 WM_{164}	—	November 29, 2005	Mount Lemmon	Mount Lemmon Survey	·	2.1 km	MPC · JPL
261560	2005 WA_{167}	—	November 29, 2005	Mount Lemmon	Mount Lemmon Survey	·	2.0 km	MPC · JPL
261561	2005 WO_{168}	—	November 30, 2005	Kitt Peak	Spacewatch	HOF	3.4 km	MPC · JPL
261562	2005 WP_{168}	—	November 30, 2005	Kitt Peak	Spacewatch	EOS	2.3 km	MPC · JPL
261563	2005 WL_{170}	—	November 30, 2005	Kitt Peak	Spacewatch	·	3.2 km	MPC · JPL
261564	2005 WB_{171}	—	November 30, 2005	Kitt Peak	Spacewatch	EOS	2.4 km	MPC · JPL
261565	2005 WP_{172}	—	November 30, 2005	Mount Lemmon	Mount Lemmon Survey	NAE	2.7 km	MPC · JPL
261566	2005 WX_{175}	—	November 30, 2005	Kitt Peak	Spacewatch	·	2.1 km	MPC · JPL
261567	2005 WY_{176}	—	November 30, 2005	Kitt Peak	Spacewatch	·	2.3 km	MPC · JPL
261568	2005 WT_{177}	—	November 30, 2005	Kitt Peak	Spacewatch	·	4.5 km	MPC · JPL
261569	2005 WQ_{178}	—	November 21, 2005	Anderson Mesa	LONEOS	·	2.4 km	MPC · JPL
261570	2005 WY_{186}	—	November 29, 2005	Kitt Peak	Spacewatch	·	2.4 km	MPC · JPL
261571	2005 WS_{188}	—	November 30, 2005	Kitt Peak	Spacewatch	·	2.4 km	MPC · JPL
261572	2005 WZ_{189}	—	November 20, 2005	Catalina	CSS	·	3.4 km	MPC · JPL
261573	2005 WB_{191}	—	November 21, 2005	Catalina	CSS	·	2.9 km	MPC · JPL
261574	2005 WA_{198}	—	November 22, 2005	Catalina	CSS	TIR	3.5 km	MPC · JPL
261575	2005 WK_{199}	—	November 25, 2005	Kitt Peak	Spacewatch	·	1.9 km	MPC · JPL
261576	2005 WT_{199}	—	November 25, 2005	Kitt Peak	Spacewatch	·	2.9 km	MPC · JPL
261577	2005 WT_{203}	—	November 21, 2005	Catalina	CSS	HNS	2.0 km	MPC · JPL
261578	2005 WM_{210}	—	November 22, 2005	Kitt Peak	Spacewatch	·	4.1 km	MPC · JPL
261579	2005 XX_{3}	—	December 1, 2005	Mount Lemmon	Mount Lemmon Survey	PAD	2.2 km	MPC · JPL
261580	2005 XS_{4}	—	December 2, 2005	Mount Lemmon	Mount Lemmon Survey	KOR	2.0 km	MPC · JPL
261581	2005 XD_{8}	—	December 6, 2005	Gnosca	S. Sposetti	·	2.3 km	MPC · JPL
261582	2005 XE_{8}	—	December 6, 2005	Gnosca	S. Sposetti	·	3.2 km	MPC · JPL
261583	2005 XV_{10}	—	December 1, 2005	Mount Lemmon	Mount Lemmon Survey	·	2.8 km	MPC · JPL
261584	2005 XH_{11}	—	December 1, 2005	Kitt Peak	Spacewatch	·	3.5 km	MPC · JPL
261585	2005 XC_{14}	—	December 1, 2005	Kitt Peak	Spacewatch	·	2.3 km	MPC · JPL
261586	2005 XL_{20}	—	December 2, 2005	Kitt Peak	Spacewatch	·	2.8 km	MPC · JPL
261587	2005 XH_{24}	—	December 2, 2005	Socorro	LINEAR	·	4.3 km	MPC · JPL
261588	2005 XK_{24}	—	December 2, 2005	Socorro	LINEAR	·	4.1 km	MPC · JPL
261589	2005 XK_{25}	—	December 4, 2005	Socorro	LINEAR	·	2.7 km	MPC · JPL
261590	2005 XT_{27}	—	December 1, 2005	Anderson Mesa	LONEOS	·	2.0 km	MPC · JPL
261591	2005 XW_{27}	—	December 1, 2005	Palomar	NEAT	H	760 m	MPC · JPL
261592	2005 XJ_{28}	—	December 1, 2005	Catalina	CSS	·	2.8 km	MPC · JPL
261593	2005 XP_{32}	—	December 4, 2005	Kitt Peak	Spacewatch	AGN	1.5 km	MPC · JPL
261594	2005 XN_{43}	—	December 2, 2005	Kitt Peak	Spacewatch	·	3.2 km	MPC · JPL
261595	2005 XX_{46}	—	December 2, 2005	Kitt Peak	Spacewatch	·	2.8 km	MPC · JPL
261596	2005 XJ_{50}	—	December 2, 2005	Kitt Peak	Spacewatch	·	3.5 km	MPC · JPL
261597	2005 XU_{53}	—	December 4, 2005	Kitt Peak	Spacewatch	·	2.2 km	MPC · JPL
261598	2005 XS_{56}	—	December 5, 2005	Catalina	CSS	H	740 m	MPC · JPL
261599	2005 XO_{57}	—	December 1, 2005	Mount Lemmon	Mount Lemmon Survey	·	2.1 km	MPC · JPL
261600	2005 XE_{59}	—	December 3, 2005	Kitt Peak	Spacewatch	·	2.2 km	MPC · JPL

== 261601–261700 ==
back to top

Designation			Discovery			Properties		Ref
Permanent	Provisional	Named after	Date	Site	Discoverer(s)	Category	Diam.	Ref
261601	2005 XD_{60}	—	December 3, 2005	Kitt Peak	Spacewatch	·	2.4 km	MPC · JPL
261602	2005 XS_{67}	—	December 5, 2005	Mount Lemmon	Mount Lemmon Survey	KOR	1.6 km	MPC · JPL
261603	2005 XX_{67}	—	December 5, 2005	Catalina	CSS	H	800 m	MPC · JPL
261604	2005 XY_{72}	—	December 6, 2005	Kitt Peak	Spacewatch	·	2.6 km	MPC · JPL
261605	2005 XF_{87}	—	December 10, 2005	Kitt Peak	Spacewatch	·	2.4 km	MPC · JPL
261606	2005 XL_{87}	—	December 5, 2005	Socorro	LINEAR	EOS	2.8 km	MPC · JPL
261607	2005 XD_{91}	—	December 10, 2005	Kitt Peak	Spacewatch	·	3.7 km	MPC · JPL
261608	2005 XD_{106}	—	December 1, 2005	Kitt Peak	M. W. Buie	·	3.3 km	MPC · JPL
261609	2005 XH_{112}	—	December 2, 2005	Kitt Peak	M. W. Buie	EOS	2.9 km	MPC · JPL
261610	2005 XF_{113}	—	December 7, 2005	Catalina	CSS	T_{j} (2.95)	5.3 km	MPC · JPL
261611	2005 XQ_{114}	—	December 1, 2005	Mount Lemmon	Mount Lemmon Survey	·	2.6 km	MPC · JPL
261612	2005 XX_{114}	—	December 1, 2005	Mount Lemmon	Mount Lemmon Survey	·	3.5 km	MPC · JPL
261613	2005 XA_{115}	—	December 7, 2005	Kitt Peak	Spacewatch	·	4.2 km	MPC · JPL
261614	2005 XJ_{115}	—	December 5, 2005	Catalina	CSS	·	5.8 km	MPC · JPL
261615	2005 YM_{5}	—	December 21, 2005	Kitt Peak	Spacewatch	·	3.2 km	MPC · JPL
261616	2005 YD_{10}	—	December 21, 2005	Kitt Peak	Spacewatch	AGN	1.5 km	MPC · JPL
261617	2005 YV_{12}	—	December 22, 2005	Kitt Peak	Spacewatch	EOS	2.3 km	MPC · JPL
261618	2005 YV_{13}	—	December 22, 2005	Kitt Peak	Spacewatch	VER	3.9 km	MPC · JPL
261619	2005 YO_{14}	—	December 22, 2005	Kitt Peak	Spacewatch	THM	2.6 km	MPC · JPL
261620	2005 YH_{18}	—	December 23, 2005	Kitt Peak	Spacewatch	KOR	1.4 km	MPC · JPL
261621	2005 YK_{22}	—	December 24, 2005	Kitt Peak	Spacewatch	·	2.1 km	MPC · JPL
261622	2005 YP_{22}	—	December 24, 2005	Kitt Peak	Spacewatch	·	3.1 km	MPC · JPL
261623	2005 YX_{22}	—	December 24, 2005	Kitt Peak	Spacewatch	THM	2.5 km	MPC · JPL
261624	2005 YB_{24}	—	December 24, 2005	Kitt Peak	Spacewatch	·	5.1 km	MPC · JPL
261625	2005 YF_{26}	—	December 24, 2005	Kitt Peak	Spacewatch	KOR	1.7 km	MPC · JPL
261626	2005 YL_{27}	—	December 22, 2005	Kitt Peak	Spacewatch	HYG	3.3 km	MPC · JPL
261627	2005 YB_{31}	—	December 22, 2005	Kitt Peak	Spacewatch	·	4.1 km	MPC · JPL
261628	2005 YE_{33}	—	December 24, 2005	Kitt Peak	Spacewatch	·	3.5 km	MPC · JPL
261629	2005 YU_{34}	—	December 24, 2005	Kitt Peak	Spacewatch	·	5.0 km	MPC · JPL
261630	2005 YS_{35}	—	December 25, 2005	Kitt Peak	Spacewatch	·	2.8 km	MPC · JPL
261631	2005 YD_{38}	—	December 21, 2005	Catalina	CSS	·	4.0 km	MPC · JPL
261632	2005 YM_{38}	—	December 21, 2005	Catalina	CSS	·	4.1 km	MPC · JPL
261633	2005 YQ_{38}	—	December 22, 2005	Catalina	CSS	EOS	3.0 km	MPC · JPL
261634	2005 YE_{41}	—	December 21, 2005	Kitt Peak	Spacewatch	·	3.2 km	MPC · JPL
261635	2005 YC_{42}	—	December 22, 2005	Kitt Peak	Spacewatch	·	4.0 km	MPC · JPL
261636	2005 YN_{48}	—	December 22, 2005	Kitt Peak	Spacewatch	·	2.6 km	MPC · JPL
261637	2005 YD_{52}	—	December 26, 2005	Mount Lemmon	Mount Lemmon Survey	KOR	1.8 km	MPC · JPL
261638	2005 YL_{53}	—	December 22, 2005	Kitt Peak	Spacewatch	KOR	1.8 km	MPC · JPL
261639	2005 YE_{55}	—	December 25, 2005	Kitt Peak	Spacewatch	·	3.6 km	MPC · JPL
261640	2005 YU_{65}	—	December 25, 2005	Mount Lemmon	Mount Lemmon Survey	·	5.6 km	MPC · JPL
261641	2005 YC_{68}	—	December 26, 2005	Kitt Peak	Spacewatch	EOS	2.3 km	MPC · JPL
261642	2005 YN_{69}	—	December 26, 2005	Kitt Peak	Spacewatch	·	3.9 km	MPC · JPL
261643	2005 YV_{74}	—	December 24, 2005	Kitt Peak	Spacewatch	THM	2.4 km	MPC · JPL
261644	2005 YO_{79}	—	December 24, 2005	Kitt Peak	Spacewatch	·	3.5 km	MPC · JPL
261645	2005 YY_{79}	—	December 24, 2005	Kitt Peak	Spacewatch	·	3.5 km	MPC · JPL
261646	2005 YJ_{83}	—	December 24, 2005	Kitt Peak	Spacewatch	·	2.2 km	MPC · JPL
261647	2005 YQ_{89}	—	December 26, 2005	Mount Lemmon	Mount Lemmon Survey	·	2.5 km	MPC · JPL
261648	2005 YM_{92}	—	December 27, 2005	Mount Lemmon	Mount Lemmon Survey	·	2.4 km	MPC · JPL
261649	2005 YL_{93}	—	December 24, 2005	Kitt Peak	Spacewatch	H	770 m	MPC · JPL
261650	2005 YS_{93}	—	December 24, 2005	Kitt Peak	Spacewatch	H	690 m	MPC · JPL
261651	2005 YO_{95}	—	December 25, 2005	Kitt Peak	Spacewatch	·	2.7 km	MPC · JPL
261652	2005 YF_{97}	—	December 24, 2005	Kitt Peak	Spacewatch	·	4.1 km	MPC · JPL
261653	2005 YB_{98}	—	December 24, 2005	Kitt Peak	Spacewatch	·	2.4 km	MPC · JPL
261654	2005 YH_{99}	—	December 28, 2005	Kitt Peak	Spacewatch	·	3.2 km	MPC · JPL
261655	2005 YB_{103}	—	December 25, 2005	Kitt Peak	Spacewatch	·	1.9 km	MPC · JPL
261656	2005 YA_{106}	—	December 25, 2005	Kitt Peak	Spacewatch	·	2.6 km	MPC · JPL
261657	2005 YQ_{107}	—	December 25, 2005	Mount Lemmon	Mount Lemmon Survey	·	2.6 km	MPC · JPL
261658	2005 YS_{107}	—	December 25, 2005	Kitt Peak	Spacewatch	·	2.5 km	MPC · JPL
261659	2005 YA_{108}	—	December 25, 2005	Kitt Peak	Spacewatch	KOR	1.3 km	MPC · JPL
261660	2005 YC_{111}	—	December 25, 2005	Kitt Peak	Spacewatch	·	3.1 km	MPC · JPL
261661	2005 YL_{113}	—	December 25, 2005	Kitt Peak	Spacewatch	·	4.6 km	MPC · JPL
261662	2005 YA_{123}	—	December 24, 2005	Socorro	LINEAR	·	3.4 km	MPC · JPL
261663	2005 YL_{124}	—	December 26, 2005	Kitt Peak	Spacewatch	·	2.0 km	MPC · JPL
261664	2005 YL_{131}	—	December 25, 2005	Mount Lemmon	Mount Lemmon Survey	·	2.8 km	MPC · JPL
261665	2005 YR_{131}	—	December 25, 2005	Mount Lemmon	Mount Lemmon Survey	THM	2.7 km	MPC · JPL
261666	2005 YM_{136}	—	December 26, 2005	Kitt Peak	Spacewatch	HYG	3.7 km	MPC · JPL
261667	2005 YW_{139}	—	December 28, 2005	Kitt Peak	Spacewatch	·	4.6 km	MPC · JPL
261668	2005 YN_{155}	—	December 25, 2005	Kitt Peak	Spacewatch	·	6.2 km	MPC · JPL
261669	2005 YR_{155}	—	December 25, 2005	Mount Lemmon	Mount Lemmon Survey	EOS	3.1 km	MPC · JPL
261670	2005 YF_{162}	—	December 27, 2005	Kitt Peak	Spacewatch	·	4.8 km	MPC · JPL
261671	2005 YH_{163}	—	December 27, 2005	Mount Lemmon	Mount Lemmon Survey	·	5.2 km	MPC · JPL
261672	2005 YY_{166}	—	December 27, 2005	Kitt Peak	Spacewatch	CYB	5.3 km	MPC · JPL
261673	2005 YG_{168}	—	December 29, 2005	Kitt Peak	Spacewatch	·	2.9 km	MPC · JPL
261674	2005 YJ_{168}	—	December 29, 2005	Kitt Peak	Spacewatch	·	3.7 km	MPC · JPL
261675	2005 YY_{173}	—	December 25, 2005	Catalina	CSS	·	5.9 km	MPC · JPL
261676	2005 YD_{180}	—	December 27, 2005	Kitt Peak	Spacewatch	·	3.3 km	MPC · JPL
261677	2005 YY_{181}	—	December 25, 2005	Catalina	CSS	TIR	4.8 km	MPC · JPL
261678	2005 YB_{186}	—	December 30, 2005	Kitt Peak	Spacewatch	·	2.3 km	MPC · JPL
261679	2005 YP_{186}	—	December 29, 2005	Catalina	CSS	·	6.0 km	MPC · JPL
261680	2005 YC_{187}	—	December 28, 2005	Kitt Peak	Spacewatch	·	2.0 km	MPC · JPL
261681	2005 YX_{188}	—	December 28, 2005	Mount Lemmon	Mount Lemmon Survey	·	2.8 km	MPC · JPL
261682	2005 YZ_{189}	—	December 30, 2005	Kitt Peak	Spacewatch	·	3.0 km	MPC · JPL
261683	2005 YL_{194}	—	December 31, 2005	Kitt Peak	Spacewatch	·	3.5 km	MPC · JPL
261684	2005 YJ_{196}	—	December 24, 2005	Kitt Peak	Spacewatch	KOR	1.7 km	MPC · JPL
261685	2005 YV_{201}	—	December 24, 2005	Kitt Peak	Spacewatch	·	3.2 km	MPC · JPL
261686	2005 YA_{207}	—	December 27, 2005	Mount Lemmon	Mount Lemmon Survey	·	4.7 km	MPC · JPL
261687	2005 YA_{208}	—	December 30, 2005	Kitt Peak	Spacewatch	·	2.4 km	MPC · JPL
261688	2005 YA_{209}	—	December 22, 2005	Catalina	CSS	·	2.6 km	MPC · JPL
261689	2005 YH_{209}	—	December 23, 2005	Socorro	LINEAR	·	2.4 km	MPC · JPL
261690 Jodorowsky	2005 YU_{210}	Jodorowsky	December 24, 2005	Nogales	J.-C. Merlin	·	4.3 km	MPC · JPL
261691	2005 YM_{211}	—	December 28, 2005	Catalina	CSS	LUT	5.2 km	MPC · JPL
261692	2005 YT_{213}	—	December 29, 2005	Catalina	CSS	·	5.8 km	MPC · JPL
261693	2005 YW_{213}	—	December 29, 2005	Socorro	LINEAR	·	4.0 km	MPC · JPL
261694	2005 YD_{215}	—	December 31, 2005	Socorro	LINEAR	URS	5.6 km	MPC · JPL
261695	2005 YQ_{219}	—	December 30, 2005	Catalina	CSS	H	740 m	MPC · JPL
261696	2005 YH_{220}	—	December 25, 2005	Anderson Mesa	LONEOS	·	2.6 km	MPC · JPL
261697	2005 YS_{221}	—	December 21, 2005	Kitt Peak	Spacewatch	·	2.4 km	MPC · JPL
261698	2005 YV_{225}	—	December 25, 2005	Mount Lemmon	Mount Lemmon Survey	·	4.6 km	MPC · JPL
261699	2005 YS_{227}	—	December 25, 2005	Kitt Peak	Spacewatch	·	3.6 km	MPC · JPL
261700	2005 YC_{237}	—	December 28, 2005	Kitt Peak	Spacewatch	EOS	2.4 km	MPC · JPL

== 261701–261800 ==
back to top

Designation			Discovery			Properties		Ref
Permanent	Provisional	Named after	Date	Site	Discoverer(s)	Category	Diam.	Ref
261701	2005 YR_{238}	—	December 29, 2005	Kitt Peak	Spacewatch	·	3.7 km	MPC · JPL
261702	2005 YT_{251}	—	December 29, 2005	Kitt Peak	Spacewatch	·	3.2 km	MPC · JPL
261703	2005 YL_{262}	—	December 25, 2005	Kitt Peak	Spacewatch	KOR	1.8 km	MPC · JPL
261704	2005 YC_{270}	—	December 26, 2005	Mount Lemmon	Mount Lemmon Survey	·	5.1 km	MPC · JPL
261705	2005 YQ_{270}	—	December 27, 2005	Mount Lemmon	Mount Lemmon Survey	HYG	3.9 km	MPC · JPL
261706	2005 YW_{272}	—	December 30, 2005	Mount Lemmon	Mount Lemmon Survey	·	2.8 km	MPC · JPL
261707	2005 YV_{290}	—	December 27, 2005	Catalina	CSS	·	3.5 km	MPC · JPL
261708	2006 AG_{2}	—	January 2, 2006	Mount Lemmon	Mount Lemmon Survey	·	3.3 km	MPC · JPL
261709	2006 AZ_{3}	—	January 6, 2006	Mayhill	Mayhill	VER	4.8 km	MPC · JPL
261710	2006 AB_{8}	—	January 7, 2006	Anderson Mesa	LONEOS	H	1 km	MPC · JPL
261711	2006 AR_{8}	—	January 2, 2006	Mount Lemmon	Mount Lemmon Survey	·	4.8 km	MPC · JPL
261712	2006 AZ_{8}	—	January 2, 2006	Socorro	LINEAR	EOS	2.8 km	MPC · JPL
261713	2006 AH_{11}	—	January 4, 2006	Catalina	CSS	TIR	4.5 km	MPC · JPL
261714	2006 AM_{11}	—	January 5, 2006	Catalina	CSS	H	800 m	MPC · JPL
261715	2006 AF_{16}	—	January 4, 2006	Kitt Peak	Spacewatch	KOR	1.8 km	MPC · JPL
261716	2006 AH_{19}	—	January 1, 2006	Catalina	CSS	·	4.4 km	MPC · JPL
261717	2006 AO_{19}	—	January 5, 2006	Kitt Peak	Spacewatch	·	3.0 km	MPC · JPL
261718	2006 AA_{22}	—	January 5, 2006	Catalina	CSS	H	960 m	MPC · JPL
261719	2006 AW_{22}	—	January 4, 2006	Kitt Peak	Spacewatch	KOR	2.2 km	MPC · JPL
261720	2006 AC_{24}	—	January 5, 2006	Kitt Peak	Spacewatch	·	2.9 km	MPC · JPL
261721	2006 AD_{24}	—	January 5, 2006	Kitt Peak	Spacewatch	·	3.1 km	MPC · JPL
261722	2006 AD_{31}	—	January 5, 2006	Kitt Peak	Spacewatch	·	1.8 km	MPC · JPL
261723	2006 AF_{40}	—	January 7, 2006	Mount Lemmon	Mount Lemmon Survey	·	2.4 km	MPC · JPL
261724	2006 AP_{41}	—	January 5, 2006	Anderson Mesa	LONEOS	·	3.6 km	MPC · JPL
261725	2006 AX_{41}	—	January 5, 2006	Kitt Peak	Spacewatch	·	3.7 km	MPC · JPL
261726	2006 AZ_{43}	—	January 7, 2006	Socorro	LINEAR	·	4.6 km	MPC · JPL
261727	2006 AN_{44}	—	January 7, 2006	Kitt Peak	Spacewatch	EOS	2.4 km	MPC · JPL
261728	2006 AS_{47}	—	January 7, 2006	Kitt Peak	Spacewatch	·	3.3 km	MPC · JPL
261729	2006 AJ_{49}	—	January 5, 2006	Kitt Peak	Spacewatch	·	3.5 km	MPC · JPL
261730	2006 AO_{52}	—	January 5, 2006	Kitt Peak	Spacewatch	·	1.8 km	MPC · JPL
261731	2006 AB_{59}	—	January 4, 2006	Catalina	CSS	TIR	3.6 km	MPC · JPL
261732	2006 AB_{65}	—	January 8, 2006	Kitt Peak	Spacewatch	·	3.3 km	MPC · JPL
261733	2006 AX_{66}	—	January 9, 2006	Kitt Peak	Spacewatch	·	2.5 km	MPC · JPL
261734	2006 AQ_{74}	—	January 6, 2006	Catalina	CSS	·	4.9 km	MPC · JPL
261735	2006 AG_{78}	—	January 8, 2006	Mount Lemmon	Mount Lemmon Survey	·	4.3 km	MPC · JPL
261736	2006 AF_{82}	—	January 4, 2006	Kitt Peak	Spacewatch	·	5.1 km	MPC · JPL
261737	2006 AZ_{82}	—	January 5, 2006	Socorro	LINEAR	HYG	3.9 km	MPC · JPL
261738	2006 AD_{90}	—	January 6, 2006	Mount Lemmon	Mount Lemmon Survey	EOS	2.3 km	MPC · JPL
261739	2006 AH_{96}	—	January 6, 2006	Catalina	CSS	·	4.9 km	MPC · JPL
261740	2006 AG_{98}	—	January 1, 2006	Catalina	CSS	EUP	6.8 km	MPC · JPL
261741	2006 AP_{100}	—	January 6, 2006	Kitt Peak	Spacewatch	·	4.8 km	MPC · JPL
261742	2006 AL_{102}	—	January 7, 2006	Mount Lemmon	Mount Lemmon Survey	·	3.0 km	MPC · JPL
261743	2006 AM_{105}	—	January 4, 2006	Catalina	CSS	·	3.5 km	MPC · JPL
261744	2006 AS_{105}	—	January 7, 2006	Mount Lemmon	Mount Lemmon Survey	THM	3.0 km	MPC · JPL
261745	2006 BO_{9}	—	January 22, 2006	Anderson Mesa	LONEOS	TIR	3.8 km	MPC · JPL
261746	2006 BE_{10}	—	January 19, 2006	Catalina	CSS	·	4.5 km	MPC · JPL
261747	2006 BM_{10}	—	January 20, 2006	Kitt Peak	Spacewatch	·	3.4 km	MPC · JPL
261748	2006 BS_{10}	—	January 20, 2006	Kitt Peak	Spacewatch	EOS	2.9 km	MPC · JPL
261749	2006 BA_{11}	—	January 20, 2006	Kitt Peak	Spacewatch	·	2.9 km	MPC · JPL
261750	2006 BP_{17}	—	January 22, 2006	Mount Lemmon	Mount Lemmon Survey	·	2.6 km	MPC · JPL
261751	2006 BD_{22}	—	January 22, 2006	Mount Lemmon	Mount Lemmon Survey	·	2.8 km	MPC · JPL
261752	2006 BX_{25}	—	January 20, 2006	Catalina	CSS	·	4.4 km	MPC · JPL
261753	2006 BG_{30}	—	January 20, 2006	Kitt Peak	Spacewatch	·	3.4 km	MPC · JPL
261754	2006 BN_{30}	—	January 20, 2006	Kitt Peak	Spacewatch	·	3.1 km	MPC · JPL
261755	2006 BY_{32}	—	January 21, 2006	Kitt Peak	Spacewatch	THM	3.2 km	MPC · JPL
261756	2006 BZ_{33}	—	January 21, 2006	Kitt Peak	Spacewatch	·	880 m	MPC · JPL
261757	2006 BG_{43}	—	January 23, 2006	Kitt Peak	Spacewatch	·	3.9 km	MPC · JPL
261758	2006 BV_{44}	—	January 23, 2006	Kitt Peak	Spacewatch	·	4.8 km	MPC · JPL
261759	2006 BM_{45}	—	January 23, 2006	Mount Lemmon	Mount Lemmon Survey	·	2.6 km	MPC · JPL
261760	2006 BU_{51}	—	January 25, 2006	Kitt Peak	Spacewatch	EOS	2.7 km	MPC · JPL
261761	2006 BU_{53}	—	January 25, 2006	Kitt Peak	Spacewatch	HYG	4.5 km	MPC · JPL
261762	2006 BP_{55}	—	January 19, 2006	Needville	J. Dellinger, Dillon, W. G.	·	4.9 km	MPC · JPL
261763	2006 BC_{56}	—	January 23, 2006	Mount Lemmon	Mount Lemmon Survey	L5	12 km	MPC · JPL
261764	2006 BN_{59}	—	January 24, 2006	Socorro	LINEAR	EOS	3.4 km	MPC · JPL
261765	2006 BC_{60}	—	January 26, 2006	Kitt Peak	Spacewatch	·	3.2 km	MPC · JPL
261766	2006 BE_{61}	—	January 22, 2006	Catalina	CSS	·	3.4 km	MPC · JPL
261767	2006 BS_{67}	—	January 23, 2006	Kitt Peak	Spacewatch	·	3.1 km	MPC · JPL
261768	2006 BZ_{67}	—	January 23, 2006	Kitt Peak	Spacewatch	·	2.0 km	MPC · JPL
261769	2006 BX_{78}	—	January 23, 2006	Catalina	CSS	·	4.2 km	MPC · JPL
261770	2006 BJ_{81}	—	January 23, 2006	Kitt Peak	Spacewatch	·	3.9 km	MPC · JPL
261771	2006 BJ_{86}	—	January 25, 2006	Kitt Peak	Spacewatch	·	3.2 km	MPC · JPL
261772	2006 BW_{86}	—	January 25, 2006	Kitt Peak	Spacewatch	THM	2.4 km	MPC · JPL
261773	2006 BX_{89}	—	January 25, 2006	Kitt Peak	Spacewatch	EMA	5.2 km	MPC · JPL
261774	2006 BT_{96}	—	January 26, 2006	Kitt Peak	Spacewatch	L5	14 km	MPC · JPL
261775	2006 BU_{97}	—	January 27, 2006	Mount Lemmon	Mount Lemmon Survey	·	3.0 km	MPC · JPL
261776	2006 BJ_{104}	—	January 25, 2006	Kitt Peak	Spacewatch	·	4.2 km	MPC · JPL
261777	2006 BG_{109}	—	January 25, 2006	Kitt Peak	Spacewatch	·	1.6 km	MPC · JPL
261778	2006 BH_{113}	—	January 25, 2006	Kitt Peak	Spacewatch	·	4.1 km	MPC · JPL
261779	2006 BQ_{121}	—	January 26, 2006	Mount Lemmon	Mount Lemmon Survey	LIX	4.6 km	MPC · JPL
261780	2006 BE_{124}	—	January 26, 2006	Kitt Peak	Spacewatch	THM	2.6 km	MPC · JPL
261781	2006 BG_{132}	—	January 26, 2006	Kitt Peak	Spacewatch	L5	12 km	MPC · JPL
261782	2006 BS_{144}	—	January 23, 2006	Catalina	CSS	·	4.4 km	MPC · JPL
261783	2006 BB_{147}	—	January 31, 2006	7300	W. K. Y. Yeung	·	6.6 km	MPC · JPL
261784	2006 BV_{147}	—	January 24, 2006	Socorro	LINEAR	·	3.5 km	MPC · JPL
261785	2006 BF_{149}	—	January 23, 2006	Catalina	CSS	·	4.6 km	MPC · JPL
261786	2006 BQ_{151}	—	January 25, 2006	Kitt Peak	Spacewatch	·	1.9 km	MPC · JPL
261787	2006 BL_{153}	—	January 25, 2006	Kitt Peak	Spacewatch	THM	3.1 km	MPC · JPL
261788	2006 BH_{158}	—	January 25, 2006	Kitt Peak	Spacewatch	EOS	2.4 km	MPC · JPL
261789	2006 BW_{158}	—	January 26, 2006	Kitt Peak	Spacewatch	L5	9.0 km	MPC · JPL
261790	2006 BU_{164}	—	January 26, 2006	Catalina	CSS	·	4.2 km	MPC · JPL
261791	2006 BM_{168}	—	January 26, 2006	Kitt Peak	Spacewatch	L5	11 km	MPC · JPL
261792	2006 BH_{179}	—	January 27, 2006	Mount Lemmon	Mount Lemmon Survey	·	1.7 km	MPC · JPL
261793	2006 BO_{179}	—	January 27, 2006	Mount Lemmon	Mount Lemmon Survey	·	5.7 km	MPC · JPL
261794	2006 BV_{183}	—	January 9, 2006	Kitt Peak	Spacewatch	·	3.3 km	MPC · JPL
261795	2006 BO_{188}	—	January 28, 2006	Kitt Peak	Spacewatch	·	4.7 km	MPC · JPL
261796	2006 BH_{201}	—	January 31, 2006	Mount Lemmon	Mount Lemmon Survey	·	2.5 km	MPC · JPL
261797	2006 BU_{207}	—	January 31, 2006	Catalina	CSS	EOS	2.5 km	MPC · JPL
261798	2006 BV_{216}	—	January 26, 2006	Catalina	CSS	VER	4.0 km	MPC · JPL
261799	2006 BM_{219}	—	January 28, 2006	Anderson Mesa	LONEOS	·	3.6 km	MPC · JPL
261800	2006 BK_{238}	—	January 31, 2006	Kitt Peak	Spacewatch	·	3.6 km	MPC · JPL

== 261801–261900 ==
back to top

Designation			Discovery			Properties		Ref
Permanent	Provisional	Named after	Date	Site	Discoverer(s)	Category	Diam.	Ref
261801	2006 BP_{245}	—	January 31, 2006	Kitt Peak	Spacewatch	·	2.4 km	MPC · JPL
261802	2006 BO_{253}	—	January 31, 2006	Kitt Peak	Spacewatch	·	4.1 km	MPC · JPL
261803	2006 BJ_{261}	—	January 31, 2006	Kitt Peak	Spacewatch	·	2.8 km	MPC · JPL
261804	2006 BL_{261}	—	January 31, 2006	Kitt Peak	Spacewatch	·	3.1 km	MPC · JPL
261805	2006 BV_{263}	—	January 31, 2006	Kitt Peak	Spacewatch	·	2.5 km	MPC · JPL
261806	2006 BW_{263}	—	January 31, 2006	Kitt Peak	Spacewatch	·	4.4 km	MPC · JPL
261807	2006 BL_{267}	—	January 26, 2006	Catalina	CSS	GEF	1.7 km	MPC · JPL
261808	2006 BD_{270}	—	January 30, 2006	Catalina	CSS	·	4.5 km	MPC · JPL
261809	2006 BS_{276}	—	January 23, 2006	Kitt Peak	Spacewatch	·	3.9 km	MPC · JPL
261810	2006 BN_{277}	—	January 23, 2006	Kitt Peak	Spacewatch	·	2.8 km	MPC · JPL
261811	2006 BN_{278}	—	January 23, 2006	Kitt Peak	Spacewatch	THM	2.8 km	MPC · JPL
261812	2006 BP_{278}	—	January 23, 2006	Mount Lemmon	Mount Lemmon Survey	EOS	3.6 km	MPC · JPL
261813	2006 BW_{280}	—	January 23, 2006	Kitt Peak	Spacewatch	·	3.9 km	MPC · JPL
261814	2006 CX_{1}	—	February 1, 2006	Kitt Peak	Spacewatch	EOS	3.4 km	MPC · JPL
261815	2006 CC_{5}	—	February 1, 2006	Kitt Peak	Spacewatch	EOS	2.6 km	MPC · JPL
261816	2006 CO_{6}	—	February 1, 2006	Mount Lemmon	Mount Lemmon Survey	·	3.4 km	MPC · JPL
261817	2006 CX_{14}	—	February 1, 2006	Kitt Peak	Spacewatch	HYG	4.3 km	MPC · JPL
261818	2006 CJ_{15}	—	February 1, 2006	Mount Lemmon	Mount Lemmon Survey	·	4.0 km	MPC · JPL
261819	2006 CL_{25}	—	February 2, 2006	Kitt Peak	Spacewatch	EOS	2.8 km	MPC · JPL
261820	2006 CF_{34}	—	February 2, 2006	Mount Lemmon	Mount Lemmon Survey	·	3.5 km	MPC · JPL
261821	2006 CO_{45}	—	February 3, 2006	Kitt Peak	Spacewatch	THM	3.0 km	MPC · JPL
261822	2006 CT_{48}	—	February 3, 2006	Kitt Peak	Spacewatch	·	5.3 km	MPC · JPL
261823	2006 CY_{48}	—	February 3, 2006	Kitt Peak	Spacewatch	THM	3.1 km	MPC · JPL
261824	2006 CC_{62}	—	February 7, 2006	Cordell-Lorenz	Cordell-Lorenz	·	3.3 km	MPC · JPL
261825	2006 CP_{62}	—	February 7, 2006	Kitt Peak	Spacewatch	THM	2.7 km	MPC · JPL
261826	2006 CO_{66}	—	February 2, 2006	Mount Lemmon	Mount Lemmon Survey	·	990 m	MPC · JPL
261827	2006 DN_{4}	—	February 20, 2006	Kitt Peak	Spacewatch	·	4.2 km	MPC · JPL
261828	2006 DD_{7}	—	February 20, 2006	Mount Lemmon	Mount Lemmon Survey	·	3.6 km	MPC · JPL
261829	2006 DV_{12}	—	February 21, 2006	Catalina	CSS	·	3.9 km	MPC · JPL
261830	2006 DD_{14}	—	February 22, 2006	Catalina	CSS	·	4.7 km	MPC · JPL
261831	2006 DP_{31}	—	February 20, 2006	Mount Lemmon	Mount Lemmon Survey	·	780 m	MPC · JPL
261832	2006 DO_{38}	—	February 21, 2006	Mount Lemmon	Mount Lemmon Survey	·	3.5 km	MPC · JPL
261833	2006 DL_{47}	—	February 21, 2006	Mount Lemmon	Mount Lemmon Survey	·	5.1 km	MPC · JPL
261834	2006 DZ_{50}	—	February 23, 2006	Anderson Mesa	LONEOS	·	4.2 km	MPC · JPL
261835	2006 DB_{63}	—	February 21, 2006	Catalina	CSS	·	4.1 km	MPC · JPL
261836	2006 DR_{63}	—	February 27, 2006	Junk Bond	D. Healy	THM	2.6 km	MPC · JPL
261837	2006 DZ_{63}	—	February 20, 2006	Catalina	CSS	THM	3.2 km	MPC · JPL
261838	2006 DD_{64}	—	February 20, 2006	Socorro	LINEAR	·	5.3 km	MPC · JPL
261839	2006 DS_{68}	—	February 26, 2006	Anderson Mesa	LONEOS	·	5.9 km	MPC · JPL
261840	2006 DZ_{72}	—	February 22, 2006	Anderson Mesa	LONEOS	·	3.6 km	MPC · JPL
261841	2006 DD_{87}	—	February 24, 2006	Kitt Peak	Spacewatch	·	4.2 km	MPC · JPL
261842	2006 DE_{93}	—	February 24, 2006	Kitt Peak	Spacewatch	·	860 m	MPC · JPL
261843	2006 DD_{120}	—	February 21, 2006	Anderson Mesa	LONEOS	·	4.0 km	MPC · JPL
261844	2006 DB_{135}	—	February 25, 2006	Mount Lemmon	Mount Lemmon Survey	·	550 m	MPC · JPL
261845	2006 DO_{138}	—	February 25, 2006	Kitt Peak	Spacewatch	·	3.4 km	MPC · JPL
261846	2006 DZ_{138}	—	February 25, 2006	Kitt Peak	Spacewatch	EOS	2.8 km	MPC · JPL
261847	2006 DZ_{158}	—	February 27, 2006	Kitt Peak	Spacewatch	·	680 m	MPC · JPL
261848	2006 DP_{161}	—	February 27, 2006	Kitt Peak	Spacewatch	THM	2.6 km	MPC · JPL
261849	2006 DM_{164}	—	February 27, 2006	Kitt Peak	Spacewatch	CYB	5.3 km	MPC · JPL
261850	2006 DX_{184}	—	February 27, 2006	Mount Lemmon	Mount Lemmon Survey	·	750 m	MPC · JPL
261851	2006 DD_{186}	—	February 27, 2006	Kitt Peak	Spacewatch	CYB	4.2 km	MPC · JPL
261852	2006 DE_{201}	—	February 27, 2006	Catalina	CSS	·	4.2 km	MPC · JPL
261853	2006 DP_{202}	—	February 21, 2006	Catalina	CSS	·	5.3 km	MPC · JPL
261854	2006 DG_{205}	—	February 25, 2006	Kitt Peak	Spacewatch	·	1.0 km	MPC · JPL
261855	2006 DB_{213}	—	February 24, 2006	Mount Lemmon	Mount Lemmon Survey	·	770 m	MPC · JPL
261856	2006 ES_{19}	—	March 2, 2006	Kitt Peak	Spacewatch	THM	2.7 km	MPC · JPL
261857	2006 EC_{36}	—	March 3, 2006	Mount Lemmon	Mount Lemmon Survey	·	2.5 km	MPC · JPL
261858	2006 EC_{39}	—	March 4, 2006	Catalina	CSS	EUP	4.5 km	MPC · JPL
261859	2006 EF_{43}	—	March 4, 2006	Catalina	CSS	·	3.9 km	MPC · JPL
261860	2006 EA_{62}	—	March 5, 2006	Kitt Peak	Spacewatch	·	4.1 km	MPC · JPL
261861	2006 EU_{63}	—	March 5, 2006	Kitt Peak	Spacewatch	·	4.0 km	MPC · JPL
261862	2006 FZ_{3}	—	March 23, 2006	Kitt Peak	Spacewatch	·	1.7 km	MPC · JPL
261863	2006 FL_{6}	—	March 23, 2006	Catalina	CSS	·	4.2 km	MPC · JPL
261864	2006 FF_{7}	—	March 23, 2006	Kitt Peak	Spacewatch	(2076)	1.3 km	MPC · JPL
261865	2006 FF_{10}	—	March 26, 2006	Reedy Creek	J. Broughton	fast	5.2 km	MPC · JPL
261866	2006 FQ_{13}	—	March 23, 2006	Kitt Peak	Spacewatch	·	680 m	MPC · JPL
261867	2006 FU_{13}	—	March 23, 2006	Kitt Peak	Spacewatch	·	820 m	MPC · JPL
261868	2006 FP_{14}	—	March 23, 2006	Kitt Peak	Spacewatch	·	660 m	MPC · JPL
261869	2006 FG_{38}	—	March 23, 2006	Kitt Peak	Spacewatch	·	2.2 km	MPC · JPL
261870	2006 FJ_{49}	—	March 25, 2006	Catalina	CSS	·	6.4 km	MPC · JPL
261871	2006 FR_{49}	—	March 25, 2006	Catalina	CSS	·	7.0 km	MPC · JPL
261872	2006 GF_{2}	—	April 3, 2006	Lulin	Q. Ye	·	1.1 km	MPC · JPL
261873	2006 GA_{26}	—	April 2, 2006	Kitt Peak	Spacewatch	·	860 m	MPC · JPL
261874	2006 GR_{30}	—	April 2, 2006	Mount Lemmon	Mount Lemmon Survey	·	1.2 km	MPC · JPL
261875	2006 GF_{31}	—	April 2, 2006	Kitt Peak	Spacewatch	·	850 m	MPC · JPL
261876	2006 GC_{32}	—	April 6, 2006	Catalina	CSS	H	790 m	MPC · JPL
261877	2006 GQ_{38}	—	April 6, 2006	Socorro	LINEAR	PHO	1.6 km	MPC · JPL
261878	2006 GR_{49}	—	April 7, 2006	Catalina	CSS	·	1.1 km	MPC · JPL
261879	2006 GO_{53}	—	April 10, 2006	Siding Spring	SSS	·	1.9 km	MPC · JPL
261880	2006 HD_{3}	—	April 18, 2006	Kitt Peak	Spacewatch	3:2	7.3 km	MPC · JPL
261881	2006 HR_{5}	—	April 19, 2006	Mount Lemmon	Mount Lemmon Survey	H	820 m	MPC · JPL
261882	2006 HY_{6}	—	April 18, 2006	Palomar	NEAT	·	1.0 km	MPC · JPL
261883	2006 HD_{7}	—	April 19, 2006	Palomar	NEAT	H	580 m	MPC · JPL
261884	2006 HQ_{10}	—	April 19, 2006	Kitt Peak	Spacewatch	(2076)	850 m	MPC · JPL
261885	2006 HD_{11}	—	April 19, 2006	Kitt Peak	Spacewatch	·	740 m	MPC · JPL
261886	2006 HP_{15}	—	April 20, 2006	Mount Lemmon	Mount Lemmon Survey	·	2.1 km	MPC · JPL
261887	2006 HE_{19}	—	April 18, 2006	Kitt Peak	Spacewatch	·	880 m	MPC · JPL
261888	2006 HQ_{20}	—	April 19, 2006	Mount Lemmon	Mount Lemmon Survey	·	1.0 km	MPC · JPL
261889	2006 HP_{23}	—	April 20, 2006	Kitt Peak	Spacewatch	·	3.5 km	MPC · JPL
261890	2006 HO_{36}	—	April 20, 2006	Catalina	CSS	·	1.1 km	MPC · JPL
261891	2006 HJ_{44}	—	April 24, 2006	Socorro	LINEAR	·	1.4 km	MPC · JPL
261892	2006 HO_{44}	—	April 24, 2006	Mount Lemmon	Mount Lemmon Survey	·	880 m	MPC · JPL
261893	2006 HG_{46}	—	April 25, 2006	Catalina	CSS	·	1.0 km	MPC · JPL
261894	2006 HK_{51}	—	April 24, 2006	Reedy Creek	J. Broughton	·	4.1 km	MPC · JPL
261895	2006 HM_{51}	—	April 24, 2006	Reedy Creek	J. Broughton	·	1.6 km	MPC · JPL
261896	2006 HU_{51}	—	April 26, 2006	Reedy Creek	J. Broughton	·	5.4 km	MPC · JPL
261897	2006 HV_{56}	—	April 19, 2006	Catalina	CSS	·	1.3 km	MPC · JPL
261898	2006 HR_{69}	—	April 24, 2006	Anderson Mesa	LONEOS	·	1.7 km	MPC · JPL
261899	2006 HT_{72}	—	April 25, 2006	Kitt Peak	Spacewatch	·	1.0 km	MPC · JPL
261900	2006 HY_{81}	—	April 26, 2006	Kitt Peak	Spacewatch	·	910 m	MPC · JPL

== 261901–262000 ==
back to top

Designation			Discovery			Properties		Ref
Permanent	Provisional	Named after	Date	Site	Discoverer(s)	Category	Diam.	Ref
261901	2006 HW_{82}	—	April 26, 2006	Kitt Peak	Spacewatch	·	810 m	MPC · JPL
261902	2006 HZ_{86}	—	April 29, 2006	Kitt Peak	Spacewatch	·	950 m	MPC · JPL
261903	2006 HG_{89}	—	April 19, 2006	Catalina	CSS	·	1.1 km	MPC · JPL
261904	2006 HN_{152}	—	April 24, 2006	Mount Lemmon	Mount Lemmon Survey	MAS	740 m	MPC · JPL
261905	2006 JW_{16}	—	May 2, 2006	Kitt Peak	Spacewatch	WIT	1.4 km	MPC · JPL
261906	2006 JG_{30}	—	May 3, 2006	Kitt Peak	Spacewatch	·	780 m	MPC · JPL
261907	2006 JZ_{43}	—	May 6, 2006	Kitt Peak	Spacewatch	·	760 m	MPC · JPL
261908	2006 JK_{48}	—	May 5, 2006	Kitt Peak	Spacewatch	V	910 m	MPC · JPL
261909	2006 JW_{49}	—	May 2, 2006	Mount Lemmon	Mount Lemmon Survey	·	1.0 km	MPC · JPL
261910	2006 JP_{58}	—	May 8, 2006	Siding Spring	SSS	·	5.5 km	MPC · JPL
261911	2006 JA_{81}	—	May 8, 2006	Mount Lemmon	Mount Lemmon Survey	·	630 m	MPC · JPL
261912	2006 KS_{2}	—	May 18, 2006	Palomar	NEAT	·	800 m	MPC · JPL
261913	2006 KE_{6}	—	May 19, 2006	Mount Lemmon	Mount Lemmon Survey	NYS	1.2 km	MPC · JPL
261914	2006 KX_{8}	—	May 19, 2006	Mount Lemmon	Mount Lemmon Survey	·	2.2 km	MPC · JPL
261915	2006 KM_{14}	—	May 20, 2006	Mount Lemmon	Mount Lemmon Survey	·	720 m	MPC · JPL
261916	2006 KW_{15}	—	May 20, 2006	Catalina	CSS	·	1.6 km	MPC · JPL
261917	2006 KH_{23}	—	May 23, 2006	Reedy Creek	J. Broughton	·	1.0 km	MPC · JPL
261918	2006 KL_{23}	—	May 23, 2006	Reedy Creek	J. Broughton	·	870 m	MPC · JPL
261919	2006 KF_{31}	—	May 20, 2006	Kitt Peak	Spacewatch	3:2	7.1 km	MPC · JPL
261920	2006 KK_{51}	—	May 21, 2006	Mount Lemmon	Mount Lemmon Survey	·	1.5 km	MPC · JPL
261921	2006 KR_{51}	—	May 21, 2006	Kitt Peak	Spacewatch	·	800 m	MPC · JPL
261922	2006 KW_{69}	—	May 22, 2006	Kitt Peak	Spacewatch	·	770 m	MPC · JPL
261923	2006 KY_{77}	—	May 24, 2006	Mount Lemmon	Mount Lemmon Survey	·	1.4 km	MPC · JPL
261924	2006 KO_{99}	—	May 27, 2006	Catalina	CSS	·	1.0 km	MPC · JPL
261925	2006 KW_{99}	—	May 24, 2006	Palomar	NEAT	·	1.6 km	MPC · JPL
261926	2006 KL_{100}	—	May 29, 2006	Reedy Creek	J. Broughton	·	1.7 km	MPC · JPL
261927	2006 KU_{111}	—	May 31, 2006	Mount Lemmon	Mount Lemmon Survey	·	930 m	MPC · JPL
261928	2006 KN_{115}	—	May 29, 2006	Kitt Peak	Spacewatch	·	1.0 km	MPC · JPL
261929	2006 KT_{120}	—	May 31, 2006	Mount Lemmon	Mount Lemmon Survey	·	1.3 km	MPC · JPL
261930 Moorhead	2006 KF_{138}	Moorhead	May 25, 2006	Mauna Kea	P. A. Wiegert	·	1.2 km	MPC · JPL
261931	2006 ML_{1}	—	June 17, 2006	Kitt Peak	Spacewatch	·	1.0 km	MPC · JPL
261932	2006 MU_{1}	—	June 19, 2006	Wrightwood	J. W. Young	·	1.1 km	MPC · JPL
261933	2006 MS_{3}	—	June 16, 2006	Palomar	NEAT	·	830 m	MPC · JPL
261934	2006 MK_{8}	—	June 18, 2006	Kitt Peak	Spacewatch	·	1.1 km	MPC · JPL
261935	2006 OM_{2}	—	July 18, 2006	Lulin	LUSS	NYS	1.1 km	MPC · JPL
261936 Liulin	2006 OR_{2}	Liulin	July 19, 2006	Lulin	Q. Ye, Lin, H.-C.	(5)	1.4 km	MPC · JPL
261937	2006 OD_{4}	—	July 21, 2006	Mount Lemmon	Mount Lemmon Survey	·	1.5 km	MPC · JPL
261938	2006 OB_{5}	—	July 21, 2006	Socorro	LINEAR	AMO	300 m	MPC · JPL
261939	2006 OP_{7}	—	July 18, 2006	Lulin	LUSS	·	2.0 km	MPC · JPL
261940	2006 OD_{9}	—	July 20, 2006	Palomar	NEAT	·	1.2 km	MPC · JPL
261941	2006 OR_{10}	—	July 21, 2006	Catalina	CSS	·	1.1 km	MPC · JPL
261942	2006 OB_{11}	—	July 20, 2006	Palomar	NEAT	·	880 m	MPC · JPL
261943	2006 ON_{11}	—	July 20, 2006	Palomar	NEAT	V	880 m	MPC · JPL
261944	2006 OR_{13}	—	July 25, 2006	Palomar	NEAT	NYS	920 m	MPC · JPL
261945	2006 OF_{16}	—	July 26, 2006	Reedy Creek	J. Broughton	·	2.2 km	MPC · JPL
261946	2006 OF_{19}	—	July 20, 2006	Siding Spring	SSS	·	1.4 km	MPC · JPL
261947	2006 OY_{20}	—	July 25, 2006	Mount Lemmon	Mount Lemmon Survey	·	920 m	MPC · JPL
261948	2006 PS_{1}	—	August 11, 2006	Palomar	NEAT	·	1.5 km	MPC · JPL
261949	2006 PK_{2}	—	August 12, 2006	Palomar	NEAT	NYS	1.4 km	MPC · JPL
261950	2006 PV_{4}	—	August 11, 2006	Palomar	NEAT	V	940 m	MPC · JPL
261951	2006 PJ_{5}	—	August 12, 2006	Palomar	NEAT	·	1.4 km	MPC · JPL
261952	2006 PD_{6}	—	August 12, 2006	Palomar	NEAT	·	1.4 km	MPC · JPL
261953	2006 PK_{8}	—	August 13, 2006	Palomar	NEAT	·	1.0 km	MPC · JPL
261954	2006 PS_{9}	—	August 13, 2006	Palomar	NEAT	·	2.1 km	MPC · JPL
261955	2006 PW_{10}	—	August 13, 2006	Palomar	NEAT	·	1.4 km	MPC · JPL
261956	2006 PQ_{11}	—	August 13, 2006	Palomar	NEAT	·	1.2 km	MPC · JPL
261957	2006 PQ_{14}	—	August 15, 2006	Palomar	NEAT	·	870 m	MPC · JPL
261958	2006 PG_{15}	—	August 15, 2006	Palomar	NEAT	NYS	1.3 km	MPC · JPL
261959	2006 PB_{16}	—	August 15, 2006	Palomar	NEAT	·	1.4 km	MPC · JPL
261960	2006 PJ_{16}	—	August 15, 2006	Palomar	NEAT	·	1.3 km	MPC · JPL
261961	2006 PS_{19}	—	August 13, 2006	Palomar	NEAT	·	710 m	MPC · JPL
261962	2006 PR_{20}	—	August 15, 2006	Palomar	NEAT	·	960 m	MPC · JPL
261963	2006 PT_{25}	—	August 13, 2006	Palomar	NEAT	·	1.3 km	MPC · JPL
261964	2006 PU_{25}	—	August 13, 2006	Palomar	NEAT	·	1.5 km	MPC · JPL
261965	2006 PQ_{26}	—	August 15, 2006	Palomar	NEAT	·	980 m	MPC · JPL
261966	2006 PU_{29}	—	August 12, 2006	Palomar	NEAT	·	990 m	MPC · JPL
261967	2006 PJ_{31}	—	August 13, 2006	Palomar	NEAT	·	1.2 km	MPC · JPL
261968	2006 PZ_{32}	—	August 15, 2006	Palomar	NEAT	NYS	1.1 km	MPC · JPL
261969	2006 PP_{33}	—	August 14, 2006	Siding Spring	SSS	V	840 m	MPC · JPL
261970	2006 PR_{35}	—	August 12, 2006	Palomar	NEAT	·	1.3 km	MPC · JPL
261971	2006 PV_{36}	—	August 12, 2006	Palomar	NEAT	·	1.0 km	MPC · JPL
261972	2006 PG_{40}	—	August 14, 2006	Palomar	NEAT	V	650 m	MPC · JPL
261973	2006 QG_{2}	—	August 17, 2006	Palomar	NEAT	NYS	1.5 km	MPC · JPL
261974	2006 QZ_{3}	—	August 18, 2006	Kitt Peak	Spacewatch	NYS	1.5 km	MPC · JPL
261975	2006 QD_{5}	—	August 19, 2006	Kitt Peak	Spacewatch	·	1.1 km	MPC · JPL
261976	2006 QJ_{10}	—	August 19, 2006	Reedy Creek	J. Broughton	·	1.9 km	MPC · JPL
261977	2006 QV_{10}	—	August 20, 2006	Pla D'Arguines	R. Ferrando	V	850 m	MPC · JPL
261978	2006 QR_{11}	—	August 16, 2006	Siding Spring	SSS	·	2.1 km	MPC · JPL
261979	2006 QY_{18}	—	August 17, 2006	Palomar	NEAT	·	1.4 km	MPC · JPL
261980	2006 QJ_{19}	—	August 17, 2006	Palomar	NEAT	·	1.5 km	MPC · JPL
261981	2006 QD_{20}	—	August 18, 2006	Anderson Mesa	LONEOS	·	1.4 km	MPC · JPL
261982	2006 QF_{21}	—	August 19, 2006	Kitt Peak	Spacewatch	·	780 m	MPC · JPL
261983	2006 QA_{22}	—	August 19, 2006	Anderson Mesa	LONEOS	·	1.9 km	MPC · JPL
261984	2006 QT_{23}	—	August 22, 2006	Wrightwood	J. W. Young	·	1.6 km	MPC · JPL
261985	2006 QH_{24}	—	August 17, 2006	Palomar	NEAT	NYS	1.5 km	MPC · JPL
261986	2006 QU_{25}	—	August 18, 2006	Kitt Peak	Spacewatch	·	1.4 km	MPC · JPL
261987	2006 QR_{29}	—	August 17, 2006	Palomar	NEAT	·	1.2 km	MPC · JPL
261988	2006 QU_{31}	—	August 18, 2006	Socorro	LINEAR	·	1.3 km	MPC · JPL
261989	2006 QO_{33}	—	August 23, 2006	Hibiscus	S. F. Hönig	·	1.5 km	MPC · JPL
261990	2006 QW_{34}	—	August 17, 2006	Palomar	NEAT	·	1.0 km	MPC · JPL
261991	2006 QJ_{35}	—	August 17, 2006	Palomar	NEAT	·	1.3 km	MPC · JPL
261992	2006 QL_{38}	—	August 18, 2006	Socorro	LINEAR	·	1.2 km	MPC · JPL
261993	2006 QV_{38}	—	August 18, 2006	Anderson Mesa	LONEOS	V	800 m	MPC · JPL
261994	2006 QH_{39}	—	August 19, 2006	Anderson Mesa	LONEOS	·	960 m	MPC · JPL
261995	2006 QQ_{40}	—	August 16, 2006	Siding Spring	SSS	NYS	1.3 km	MPC · JPL
261996	2006 QB_{43}	—	August 17, 2006	Palomar	NEAT	·	1.6 km	MPC · JPL
261997	2006 QA_{45}	—	August 19, 2006	Palomar	NEAT	V	790 m	MPC · JPL
261998	2006 QK_{47}	—	August 20, 2006	Palomar	NEAT	NYS	1.3 km	MPC · JPL
261999	2006 QK_{49}	—	August 21, 2006	Palomar	NEAT	·	1.4 km	MPC · JPL
262000	2006 QM_{50}	—	August 22, 2006	Palomar	NEAT	NYS	1.4 km	MPC · JPL

back to top

== See also ==
- Meanings of minor-planet names: 261001–262000
