= Meanings of minor-planet names: 261001–262000 =

As minor planet discoveries are confirmed, they are given a permanent number by the IAU's Minor Planet Center (MPC), and the discoverers can then submit names for them, following the IAU's naming conventions. The list below concerns those minor planets in the specified number-range that have received names, and explains the meanings of those names.

Official naming citations of newly named small Solar System bodies are approved and published in a bulletin by IAU's Working Group for Small Bodies Nomenclature (WGSBN). Before May 2021, citations were published in MPC's Minor Planet Circulars for many decades. Recent citations can also be found on the JPL Small-Body Database (SBDB). Until his death in 2016, German astronomer Lutz D. Schmadel compiled these citations into the Dictionary of Minor Planet Names (DMP) and regularly updated the collection.

Based on Paul Herget's The Names of the Minor Planets, Schmadel also researched the unclear origin of numerous asteroids, most of which had been named prior to World War II. This article incorporates text from this source, which is in the public domain: SBDB New namings may only be added to this list below after official publication as the preannouncement of names is condemned. The WGSBN publishes a comprehensive guideline for the naming rules of non-cometary small Solar System bodies.

== 261001–261100 ==
Named minor planet	Provisional	This minor planet was named for...	Ref · Catalog
There are no named minor planets in this number range

== 261101–261200 ==
back to top

Named minor planet	Provisional	This minor planet was named for...	Ref · Catalog
261107 Cameroncasimir	2005 SW_{282}	Cameron Casimir Sage Becker (born 2017) is the son of the discoverer, and twin brother of Oban Helian Duane Becker.	IAU · 261107
261108 Obanhelian	2005 SZ_{283}	Oban Helian Duane Becker (born 2017) is the son of the discoverer, and twin brother of Cameron Casimir Sage Becker.	IAU · 261108
261109 Annie	2005 SN_{284}	Annie Lakey Becker (born 1980), an American microbiologist and wife of the discoverer Andrew C. Becker	JPL · 261109
261110 Neoma	2005 SE_{285}	Neoma Tennyson Skye Becker (born 2015) is the daughter of the discoverer.	JPL · 261110

== 261201–261300 ==
back to top

Named minor planet	Provisional	This minor planet was named for...	Ref · Catalog
261291 Fucecchio	2005 UC_{159}	Fucecchio, a historic Italian town located between Pisa and Florence	JPL · 261291

== 261301–261400 ==
back to top

Named minor planet	Provisional	This minor planet was named for...	Ref · Catalog
There are no named minor planets in this number range

== 261401–261500 ==
back to top

Named minor planet	Provisional	This minor planet was named for...	Ref · Catalog
There are no named minor planets in this number range

== 261501–261600 ==
back to top

Named minor planet	Provisional	This minor planet was named for...	Ref · Catalog
There are no named minor planets in this number range

== 261601–261700 ==
back to top

Named minor planet	Provisional	This minor planet was named for...	Ref · Catalog
261690 Jodorowsky	2005 YU_{210}	Alejandro Jodorowsky (born 1929), a Chilean-French film-maker, playwright, actor, author, musician and comics writer.	JPL · 261690

== 261701–261800 ==
back to top

Named minor planet	Provisional	This minor planet was named for...	Ref · Catalog
There are no named minor planets in this number range

== 261801–261900 ==
back to top

Named minor planet	Provisional	This minor planet was named for...	Ref · Catalog
There are no named minor planets in this number range

== 261901–262000 ==
back to top

Named minor planet	Provisional	This minor planet was named for...	Ref · Catalog
261930 Moorhead	2006 KF_{138}	James Marshall Moorhead (born 1940), an American-Canadian astronomer	JPL · 261930
261936 Liulin	2006 OR_{2}	Liu Lin (born 1936), a professor at China's Nanjing University	JPL · 261936

back to top

Preceded by 260,001–261,000	Meanings of minor-planet names List of minor planets: 261,001–262,000	Succeeded by 262,001–263,000
