= Meanings of minor-planet names: 260001–261000 =

As minor planet discoveries are confirmed, they are given a permanent number by the IAU's Minor Planet Center (MPC), and the discoverers can then submit names for them, following the IAU's naming conventions. The list below concerns those minor planets in the specified number-range that have received names, and explains the meanings of those names.

Official naming citations of newly named small Solar System bodies are approved and published in a bulletin by IAU's Working Group for Small Bodies Nomenclature (WGSBN). Before May 2021, citations were published in MPC's Minor Planet Circulars for many decades. Recent citations can also be found on the JPL Small-Body Database (SBDB). Until his death in 2016, German astronomer Lutz D. Schmadel compiled these citations into the Dictionary of Minor Planet Names (DMP) and regularly updated the collection.

Based on Paul Herget's The Names of the Minor Planets, Schmadel also researched the unclear origin of numerous asteroids, most of which had been named prior to World War II. This article incorporates text from this source, which is in the public domain: SBDB New namings may only be added to this list below after official publication as the preannouncement of names is condemned. The WGSBN publishes a comprehensive guideline for the naming rules of non-cometary small Solar System bodies.

== 260001–260100 ==
Named minor planet	Provisional	This minor planet was named for...	Ref · Catalog
260098 Staargyula	2004 ME_{5}	Gyula Staar (born 1944) is a major figure of Hungarian scientific journalism. He has conducted long interviews with prominent mathematicians and physicists, most of which were also published in book form. He is the winner of the 2018 annual science communication award of the Club of Hungarian Science Journalists.	JPL · 260098

== 260101–260200 ==
back to top

Named minor planet	Provisional	This minor planet was named for...	Ref · Catalog
There are no named minor planets in this number range

== 260201–260300 ==
back to top

Named minor planet	Provisional	This minor planet was named for...	Ref · Catalog
260235 Attwood	2004 RU_{289}	Randy Attwood (born 1957), a Canadian editor who has served as national President of the Royal Astronomical Society of Canada.	JPL · 260235

== 260301–260400 ==
back to top

Named minor planet	Provisional	This minor planet was named for...	Ref · Catalog
260366 Quanah	2004 US_{3}	Quanah Parker (c. 1852–1911), Native American and last chief of the Comanche Nation	JPL · 260366

== 260401–260500 ==
back to top

Named minor planet	Provisional	This minor planet was named for...	Ref · Catalog
There are no named minor planets in this number range

== 260501–260600 ==
back to top

Named minor planet	Provisional	This minor planet was named for...	Ref · Catalog
260508 Alagna	2005 EU_{51}	Roberto Alagna (born 1963), a French tenor of Sicilian origin.	JPL · 260508

== 260601–260700 ==
back to top

Named minor planet	Provisional	This minor planet was named for...	Ref · Catalog
260601 Wesselényi	2005 GP_{8}	Miklós Wesselényi (1796–1850), a Hungarian statesman, leader of the upper house of the Diet, member of the Board of Academy of Sciences, and a hero of the 1838 Pest flood.	JPL · 260601
260676 Évethurière	2005 JT_{44}	Évelyne Gerlic, born Thurière (1944–2013), a researcher in nuclear physics, who worked at the French National Center for Scientific Research (CNRS), France.	JPL · 260676

== 260701–260800 ==
back to top

Named minor planet	Provisional	This minor planet was named for...	Ref · Catalog
260724 Malherbe	2005 KB_{10}	Francois de Malherbe (1555–1628), a French poet and a great defender of the purity of French language.	JPL · 260724

== 260801–260900 ==
back to top

Named minor planet	Provisional	This minor planet was named for...	Ref · Catalog
260824 Hermanus	2005 PC_{24}	Hermanus, a South African coastal town previously named "Hermanuspietersfontein", which was founded in honor of the man who taught Dutch to farmers' children	JPL · 260824
260886 Henritudor	2005 QP_{143}	Henri Owen Tudor (1859–1928), a Luxembourgish engineer and inventor.	JPL · 260886

== 260901–261000 ==
back to top

Named minor planet	Provisional	This minor planet was named for...	Ref · Catalog
260906 Robichon	2005 RR_{2}	Noël Robichon [WD] (born 1967), a French astronomer, working at the Paris-Meudon Observatory.	JPL · 260906

back to top

Preceded by 259,001–260,000	Meanings of minor-planet names List of minor planets: 260,001–261,000	Succeeded by 261,001–262,000
