= List of minor planets: 260001–261000 =

The following is a partial list of minor planets, running from minor-planet number 260001 through 261000, inclusive. The primary data for this and other partial lists is based on JPL's "Small-Body Orbital Elements" and data available from the Minor Planet Center. Critical list information is also provided by the MPC, unless otherwise specified from Lowell Observatory. A detailed description of the table's columns and additional sources are given on the main page including a complete list of every page in this series, and a statistical break-up on the dynamical classification of minor planets.

Also see the summary list of all named bodies in numerical and alphabetical order, and the corresponding naming citations for the number range of this particular list. New namings may only be added to this list after official publication, as the preannouncement of names is condemned by the Working Group for Small Bodies Nomenclature of the International Astronomical Union.

Near-Earth obj.	MBA (inner)	MBA (outer)	Centaur
Mars-crosser	MBA (middle)	Jupiter trojan	Trans-Neptunian obj.
Unclassified

== 260001–260100 ==
Designation			Discovery			Properties		Ref
Permanent	Provisional	Named after	Date	Site	Discoverer(s)	Category	Diam.	Ref
260001	2004 FR_{112}	—	March 26, 2004	Kitt Peak	Spacewatch	MAS	930 m	MPC · JPL
260002	2004 FJ_{116}	—	March 23, 2004	Socorro	LINEAR	DOR	3.9 km	MPC · JPL
260003	2004 FK_{118}	—	March 22, 2004	Socorro	LINEAR	NYS	1.6 km	MPC · JPL
260004	2004 FX_{118}	—	March 22, 2004	Socorro	LINEAR	·	1.5 km	MPC · JPL
260005	2004 FC_{121}	—	March 23, 2004	Socorro	LINEAR	·	1.8 km	MPC · JPL
260006	2004 FX_{123}	—	March 26, 2004	Catalina	CSS	·	2.0 km	MPC · JPL
260007	2004 FT_{124}	—	March 27, 2004	Socorro	LINEAR	AEO	1.4 km	MPC · JPL
260008	2004 FK_{126}	—	March 27, 2004	Socorro	LINEAR	NYS	1.4 km	MPC · JPL
260009	2004 FT_{127}	—	March 27, 2004	Socorro	LINEAR	·	2.9 km	MPC · JPL
260010	2004 FD_{128}	—	March 27, 2004	Socorro	LINEAR	·	2.0 km	MPC · JPL
260011	2004 FO_{130}	—	March 22, 2004	Anderson Mesa	LONEOS	·	2.8 km	MPC · JPL
260012	2004 FN_{139}	—	March 24, 2004	Siding Spring	SSS	·	3.2 km	MPC · JPL
260013	2004 FG_{141}	—	March 27, 2004	Socorro	LINEAR	·	1.4 km	MPC · JPL
260014	2004 FD_{148}	—	March 18, 2004	Catalina	CSS	HNS	1.7 km	MPC · JPL
260015	2004 FG_{148}	—	March 20, 2004	Anderson Mesa	LONEOS	·	2.1 km	MPC · JPL
260016	2004 FL_{148}	—	March 29, 2004	Socorro	LINEAR	·	1.4 km	MPC · JPL
260017	2004 FQ_{148}	—	March 29, 2004	Siding Spring	SSS	PHO	1.9 km	MPC · JPL
260018	2004 FV_{151}	—	March 17, 2004	Kitt Peak	Spacewatch	·	1.5 km	MPC · JPL
260019	2004 FS_{154}	—	March 17, 2004	Catalina	CSS	EUN	2.2 km	MPC · JPL
260020	2004 GM_{8}	—	April 12, 2004	Kitt Peak	Spacewatch	AGN	1.7 km	MPC · JPL
260021	2004 GF_{15}	—	April 13, 2004	Catalina	CSS	·	2.1 km	MPC · JPL
260022	2004 GS_{16}	—	April 10, 2004	Palomar	NEAT	·	3.2 km	MPC · JPL
260023	2004 GB_{18}	—	April 12, 2004	Catalina	CSS	·	1.5 km	MPC · JPL
260024	2004 GC_{23}	—	April 12, 2004	Kitt Peak	Spacewatch	·	2.5 km	MPC · JPL
260025	2004 GR_{24}	—	April 13, 2004	Kitt Peak	Spacewatch	JUN	1.7 km	MPC · JPL
260026	2004 GT_{24}	—	April 13, 2004	Kitt Peak	Spacewatch	·	1.5 km	MPC · JPL
260027	2004 GA_{25}	—	April 13, 2004	Siding Spring	SSS	·	3.1 km	MPC · JPL
260028	2004 GG_{25}	—	April 14, 2004	Socorro	LINEAR	H	610 m	MPC · JPL
260029	2004 GQ_{25}	—	April 14, 2004	Kitt Peak	Spacewatch	·	2.6 km	MPC · JPL
260030	2004 GZ_{25}	—	April 14, 2004	Kitt Peak	Spacewatch	·	1.3 km	MPC · JPL
260031	2004 GU_{31}	—	April 15, 2004	Anderson Mesa	LONEOS	·	1.5 km	MPC · JPL
260032	2004 GD_{32}	—	April 12, 2004	Kitt Peak	Spacewatch	·	1.6 km	MPC · JPL
260033	2004 GZ_{35}	—	April 13, 2004	Palomar	NEAT	PHO	3.3 km	MPC · JPL
260034	2004 GP_{36}	—	April 13, 2004	Palomar	NEAT	·	2.2 km	MPC · JPL
260035	2004 GX_{36}	—	April 13, 2004	Siding Spring	SSS	EUN	1.9 km	MPC · JPL
260036	2004 GS_{37}	—	April 14, 2004	Kitt Peak	Spacewatch	·	1.6 km	MPC · JPL
260037	2004 GK_{40}	—	April 12, 2004	Anderson Mesa	LONEOS	·	2.9 km	MPC · JPL
260038	2004 GV_{41}	—	April 14, 2004	Kitt Peak	Spacewatch	·	1.2 km	MPC · JPL
260039	2004 GU_{47}	—	April 12, 2004	Kitt Peak	Spacewatch	·	1.8 km	MPC · JPL
260040	2004 GW_{50}	—	April 13, 2004	Kitt Peak	Spacewatch	·	1.9 km	MPC · JPL
260041	2004 GV_{52}	—	April 13, 2004	Kitt Peak	Spacewatch	·	2.1 km	MPC · JPL
260042	2004 GY_{52}	—	April 13, 2004	Kitt Peak	Spacewatch	·	1.6 km	MPC · JPL
260043	2004 GB_{55}	—	April 13, 2004	Kitt Peak	Spacewatch	·	1.9 km	MPC · JPL
260044	2004 GQ_{59}	—	April 13, 2004	Kitt Peak	Spacewatch	·	4.4 km	MPC · JPL
260045	2004 GJ_{60}	—	April 14, 2004	Kitt Peak	Spacewatch	·	1.7 km	MPC · JPL
260046	2004 GJ_{71}	—	April 13, 2004	Palomar	NEAT	·	2.9 km	MPC · JPL
260047	2004 GB_{73}	—	April 14, 2004	Anderson Mesa	LONEOS	·	2.1 km	MPC · JPL
260048	2004 GB_{82}	—	April 13, 2004	Palomar	NEAT	·	2.0 km	MPC · JPL
260049	2004 GK_{86}	—	April 14, 2004	Kitt Peak	Spacewatch	·	1.4 km	MPC · JPL
260050	2004 GF_{88}	—	April 14, 2004	Haleakala	NEAT	·	2.1 km	MPC · JPL
260051	2004 HZ_{2}	—	April 16, 2004	Socorro	LINEAR	·	2.1 km	MPC · JPL
260052	2004 HY_{8}	—	April 16, 2004	Socorro	LINEAR	ADE	2.9 km	MPC · JPL
260053	2004 HL_{9}	—	April 17, 2004	Socorro	LINEAR	·	4.0 km	MPC · JPL
260054	2004 HV_{17}	—	April 17, 2004	Socorro	LINEAR	JUN	1.4 km	MPC · JPL
260055	2004 HT_{20}	—	April 19, 2004	Socorro	LINEAR	NYS	1.5 km	MPC · JPL
260056	2004 HC_{23}	—	April 16, 2004	Kitt Peak	Spacewatch	EUN	1.1 km	MPC · JPL
260057	2004 HT_{27}	—	April 20, 2004	Socorro	LINEAR	·	2.1 km	MPC · JPL
260058	2004 HC_{28}	—	April 20, 2004	Socorro	LINEAR	ADE	2.3 km	MPC · JPL
260059	2004 HF_{30}	—	April 21, 2004	Socorro	LINEAR	·	2.9 km	MPC · JPL
260060	2004 HR_{33}	—	April 16, 2004	Socorro	LINEAR	·	1.7 km	MPC · JPL
260061	2004 HH_{37}	—	April 21, 2004	Kitt Peak	Spacewatch	·	1.9 km	MPC · JPL
260062	2004 HE_{38}	—	April 23, 2004	Socorro	LINEAR	GEF	2.0 km	MPC · JPL
260063	2004 HE_{39}	—	April 25, 2004	Socorro	LINEAR	H	700 m	MPC · JPL
260064	2004 HL_{40}	—	April 19, 2004	Kitt Peak	Spacewatch	AGN	1.5 km	MPC · JPL
260065	2004 HF_{46}	—	April 21, 2004	Siding Spring	SSS	ADE	2.9 km	MPC · JPL
260066	2004 HF_{48}	—	April 22, 2004	Siding Spring	SSS	·	2.6 km	MPC · JPL
260067	2004 HU_{48}	—	April 22, 2004	Siding Spring	SSS	·	2.0 km	MPC · JPL
260068	2004 HA_{51}	—	April 23, 2004	Siding Spring	SSS	·	4.6 km	MPC · JPL
260069	2004 HJ_{52}	—	April 24, 2004	Socorro	LINEAR	·	2.1 km	MPC · JPL
260070	2004 HJ_{56}	—	April 25, 2004	Socorro	LINEAR	ADE	2.9 km	MPC · JPL
260071	2004 HK_{56}	—	April 25, 2004	Anderson Mesa	LONEOS	·	2.1 km	MPC · JPL
260072	2004 HT_{57}	—	April 21, 2004	Kitt Peak	Spacewatch	GEF	1.6 km	MPC · JPL
260073	2004 HM_{59}	—	April 25, 2004	Kitt Peak	Spacewatch	·	1.8 km	MPC · JPL
260074	2004 HK_{65}	—	April 17, 2004	Socorro	LINEAR	PHO	1.3 km	MPC · JPL
260075	2004 HJ_{72}	—	April 26, 2004	Socorro	LINEAR	·	5.2 km	MPC · JPL
260076	2004 JJ_{7}	—	May 9, 2004	Kitt Peak	Spacewatch	NYS	1.4 km	MPC · JPL
260077	2004 JU_{10}	—	May 12, 2004	Catalina	CSS	·	3.5 km	MPC · JPL
260078	2004 JV_{12}	—	May 13, 2004	Reedy Creek	J. Broughton	·	2.0 km	MPC · JPL
260079	2004 JZ_{17}	—	May 13, 2004	Kitt Peak	Spacewatch	EUN	1.4 km	MPC · JPL
260080	2004 JS_{26}	—	May 15, 2004	Socorro	LINEAR	·	1.6 km	MPC · JPL
260081	2004 JW_{30}	—	May 15, 2004	Socorro	LINEAR	·	2.2 km	MPC · JPL
260082	2004 JE_{34}	—	May 15, 2004	Socorro	LINEAR	JUN	1.7 km	MPC · JPL
260083	2004 JR_{36}	—	May 12, 2004	Siding Spring	SSS	·	2.9 km	MPC · JPL
260084	2004 JJ_{45}	—	May 12, 2004	Catalina	CSS	·	1.9 km	MPC · JPL
260085	2004 KG_{4}	—	May 16, 2004	Siding Spring	SSS	MAS	1.0 km	MPC · JPL
260086	2004 KW_{5}	—	May 17, 2004	Socorro	LINEAR	·	1.5 km	MPC · JPL
260087	2004 KS_{6}	—	May 18, 2004	Campo Imperatore	CINEOS	MAS	1.0 km	MPC · JPL
260088	2004 KT_{12}	—	May 22, 2004	Catalina	CSS	·	2.1 km	MPC · JPL
260089	2004 KO_{17}	—	May 27, 2004	Uccle	Uccle	·	3.4 km	MPC · JPL
260090	2004 KW_{17}	—	May 24, 2004	Bergisch Gladbach	W. Bickel	·	4.3 km	MPC · JPL
260091	2004 LK_{2}	—	June 6, 2004	Palomar	NEAT	·	2.3 km	MPC · JPL
260092	2004 LW_{2}	—	June 11, 2004	Palomar	NEAT	·	2.1 km	MPC · JPL
260093	2004 LL_{15}	—	June 11, 2004	Kitt Peak	Spacewatch	·	3.0 km	MPC · JPL
260094	2004 LM_{15}	—	June 11, 2004	Palomar	NEAT	·	2.8 km	MPC · JPL
260095	2004 LL_{20}	—	June 12, 2004	Socorro	LINEAR	RAF	1.1 km	MPC · JPL
260096	2004 LH_{21}	—	June 12, 2004	Socorro	LINEAR	·	2.0 km	MPC · JPL
260097	2004 MX_{3}	—	June 22, 2004	Wrightwood	J. W. Young	·	4.1 km	MPC · JPL
260098 Staargyula	2004 ME_{5}	Staargyula	June 18, 2004	Piszkéstető	K. Sárneczky	RAF	1.2 km	MPC · JPL
260099	2004 NN	—	July 8, 2004	Siding Spring	SSS	H	740 m	MPC · JPL
260100	2004 NK_{4}	—	July 11, 2004	Socorro	LINEAR	H	800 m	MPC · JPL

== 260101–260200 ==
back to top

Designation			Discovery			Properties		Ref
Permanent	Provisional	Named after	Date	Site	Discoverer(s)	Category	Diam.	Ref
260101	2004 NZ_{9}	—	July 9, 2004	Socorro	LINEAR	·	4.2 km	MPC · JPL
260102	2004 ND_{19}	—	July 14, 2004	Socorro	LINEAR	·	4.8 km	MPC · JPL
260103	2004 NL_{25}	—	July 14, 2004	Needville	J. Dellinger	·	2.5 km	MPC · JPL
260104	2004 NJ_{31}	—	July 11, 2004	Anderson Mesa	LONEOS	·	4.6 km	MPC · JPL
260105	2004 NR_{31}	—	July 15, 2004	Siding Spring	SSS	·	2.4 km	MPC · JPL
260106	2004 NY_{31}	—	July 15, 2004	Siding Spring	SSS	·	2.2 km	MPC · JPL
260107	2004 OE_{1}	—	July 16, 2004	Socorro	LINEAR	·	2.4 km	MPC · JPL
260108	2004 OX_{3}	—	July 17, 2004	Socorro	LINEAR	·	3.8 km	MPC · JPL
260109	2004 OX_{7}	—	July 16, 2004	Socorro	LINEAR	·	4.1 km	MPC · JPL
260110	2004 PL_{5}	—	August 6, 2004	Palomar	NEAT	·	2.8 km	MPC · JPL
260111	2004 PO_{6}	—	August 6, 2004	Palomar	NEAT	·	2.6 km	MPC · JPL
260112	2004 PY_{10}	—	August 7, 2004	Palomar	NEAT	·	2.1 km	MPC · JPL
260113	2004 PP_{13}	—	August 7, 2004	Palomar	NEAT	·	2.3 km	MPC · JPL
260114	2004 PL_{21}	—	August 7, 2004	Palomar	NEAT	EUP	5.3 km	MPC · JPL
260115	2004 PP_{22}	—	August 8, 2004	Socorro	LINEAR	·	3.6 km	MPC · JPL
260116	2004 PK_{27}	—	August 8, 2004	Reedy Creek	J. Broughton	EOS	2.9 km	MPC · JPL
260117	2004 PZ_{27}	—	August 4, 2004	Palomar	NEAT	·	3.3 km	MPC · JPL
260118	2004 PP_{28}	—	August 6, 2004	Palomar	NEAT	LIX	4.9 km	MPC · JPL
260119	2004 PL_{33}	—	August 8, 2004	Socorro	LINEAR	·	3.0 km	MPC · JPL
260120	2004 PJ_{36}	—	August 9, 2004	Campo Imperatore	CINEOS	·	3.3 km	MPC · JPL
260121	2004 PX_{43}	—	August 6, 2004	Palomar	NEAT	EOS	2.7 km	MPC · JPL
260122	2004 PU_{63}	—	August 10, 2004	Socorro	LINEAR	·	2.6 km	MPC · JPL
260123	2004 PX_{63}	—	August 10, 2004	Socorro	LINEAR	·	2.6 km	MPC · JPL
260124	2004 PO_{64}	—	August 10, 2004	Socorro	LINEAR	·	3.1 km	MPC · JPL
260125	2004 PB_{67}	—	August 12, 2004	Socorro	LINEAR	EUN	2.3 km	MPC · JPL
260126	2004 PZ_{74}	—	August 8, 2004	Anderson Mesa	LONEOS	·	2.9 km	MPC · JPL
260127	2004 PB_{78}	—	August 9, 2004	Socorro	LINEAR	·	3.5 km	MPC · JPL
260128	2004 PF_{80}	—	August 9, 2004	Socorro	LINEAR	·	3.3 km	MPC · JPL
260129	2004 PV_{92}	—	August 11, 2004	Wrightwood	Vale, M.	·	3.1 km	MPC · JPL
260130	2004 PF_{95}	—	August 12, 2004	Socorro	LINEAR	·	3.1 km	MPC · JPL
260131	2004 PG_{95}	—	August 12, 2004	Socorro	LINEAR	·	3.8 km	MPC · JPL
260132	2004 PT_{95}	—	August 13, 2004	Reedy Creek	J. Broughton	·	2.8 km	MPC · JPL
260133	2004 PR_{105}	—	August 14, 2004	Palomar	NEAT	(31811)	4.3 km	MPC · JPL
260134	2004 PW_{113}	—	August 10, 2004	Socorro	LINEAR	·	3.4 km	MPC · JPL
260135	2004 PN_{114}	—	August 9, 2004	Palomar	NEAT	·	3.6 km	MPC · JPL
260136	2004 PH_{115}	—	August 7, 2004	Palomar	NEAT	EOS	2.4 km	MPC · JPL
260137	2004 PL_{115}	—	August 12, 2004	Cerro Tololo	M. W. Buie	·	1.9 km	MPC · JPL
260138	2004 QV_{9}	—	August 21, 2004	Siding Spring	SSS	·	4.1 km	MPC · JPL
260139	2004 QU_{14}	—	August 21, 2004	Catalina	CSS	·	2.9 km	MPC · JPL
260140	2004 QM_{22}	—	August 26, 2004	Socorro	LINEAR	H	810 m	MPC · JPL
260141	2004 QT_{24}	—	August 27, 2004	Siding Spring	SSS	APO · PHA	770 m	MPC · JPL
260142	2004 QA_{27}	—	August 23, 2004	Anderson Mesa	LONEOS	·	4.2 km	MPC · JPL
260143	2004 QQ_{27}	—	August 26, 2004	Siding Spring	SSS	·	4.0 km	MPC · JPL
260144	2004 QT_{27}	—	August 25, 2004	Kitt Peak	Spacewatch	·	3.5 km	MPC · JPL
260145	2004 RD_{2}	—	September 6, 2004	Socorro	LINEAR	·	7.3 km	MPC · JPL
260146	2004 RO_{3}	—	September 3, 2004	Palomar	NEAT	·	2.8 km	MPC · JPL
260147	2004 RK_{5}	—	September 4, 2004	Palomar	NEAT	·	4.1 km	MPC · JPL
260148	2004 RH_{6}	—	September 4, 2004	Palomar	NEAT	·	3.4 km	MPC · JPL
260149	2004 RT_{6}	—	September 5, 2004	Palomar	NEAT	·	3.7 km	MPC · JPL
260150	2004 RU_{13}	—	September 6, 2004	Siding Spring	SSS	·	3.2 km	MPC · JPL
260151	2004 RP_{19}	—	September 7, 2004	Kitt Peak	Spacewatch	·	3.6 km	MPC · JPL
260152	2004 RU_{26}	—	September 6, 2004	Palomar	NEAT	·	2.7 km	MPC · JPL
260153	2004 RW_{27}	—	September 6, 2004	Siding Spring	SSS	·	2.7 km	MPC · JPL
260154	2004 RS_{33}	—	September 7, 2004	Socorro	LINEAR	·	3.5 km	MPC · JPL
260155	2004 RV_{36}	—	September 7, 2004	Socorro	LINEAR	·	4.1 km	MPC · JPL
260156	2004 RB_{41}	—	September 7, 2004	Kitt Peak	Spacewatch	·	2.3 km	MPC · JPL
260157	2004 RJ_{42}	—	September 7, 2004	Kitt Peak	Spacewatch	·	2.7 km	MPC · JPL
260158	2004 RZ_{46}	—	September 8, 2004	Socorro	LINEAR	·	2.6 km	MPC · JPL
260159	2004 RJ_{52}	—	September 8, 2004	Socorro	LINEAR	·	6.9 km	MPC · JPL
260160	2004 RK_{54}	—	September 8, 2004	Socorro	LINEAR	·	2.7 km	MPC · JPL
260161	2004 RP_{55}	—	September 8, 2004	Socorro	LINEAR	·	2.6 km	MPC · JPL
260162	2004 RN_{57}	—	September 8, 2004	Socorro	LINEAR	·	3.0 km	MPC · JPL
260163	2004 RO_{62}	—	September 8, 2004	Socorro	LINEAR	·	3.4 km	MPC · JPL
260164	2004 RB_{64}	—	September 8, 2004	Socorro	LINEAR	·	3.1 km	MPC · JPL
260165	2004 RP_{64}	—	September 8, 2004	Socorro	LINEAR	·	4.4 km	MPC · JPL
260166	2004 RS_{65}	—	September 8, 2004	Socorro	LINEAR	·	4.4 km	MPC · JPL
260167	2004 RR_{69}	—	September 8, 2004	Socorro	LINEAR	·	3.9 km	MPC · JPL
260168	2004 RH_{70}	—	September 8, 2004	Socorro	LINEAR	·	5.7 km	MPC · JPL
260169	2004 RQ_{84}	—	September 7, 2004	Socorro	LINEAR	·	4.8 km	MPC · JPL
260170	2004 RA_{87}	—	September 7, 2004	Palomar	NEAT	EOS	3.0 km	MPC · JPL
260171	2004 RN_{90}	—	September 8, 2004	Socorro	LINEAR	·	2.9 km	MPC · JPL
260172	2004 RX_{95}	—	September 8, 2004	Socorro	LINEAR	·	3.1 km	MPC · JPL
260173	2004 RL_{97}	—	September 8, 2004	Palomar	NEAT	·	3.4 km	MPC · JPL
260174	2004 RM_{98}	—	September 8, 2004	Socorro	LINEAR	T_{j} (2.97)	3.8 km	MPC · JPL
260175	2004 RY_{98}	—	September 8, 2004	Socorro	LINEAR	HYG	3.3 km	MPC · JPL
260176	2004 RJ_{103}	—	September 8, 2004	Palomar	NEAT	·	3.5 km	MPC · JPL
260177	2004 RC_{105}	—	September 8, 2004	Palomar	NEAT	EOS	3.0 km	MPC · JPL
260178	2004 RO_{108}	—	September 9, 2004	Kitt Peak	Spacewatch	·	2.8 km	MPC · JPL
260179	2004 RS_{112}	—	September 6, 2004	Socorro	LINEAR	·	4.9 km	MPC · JPL
260180	2004 RB_{123}	—	September 7, 2004	Kitt Peak	Spacewatch	·	3.7 km	MPC · JPL
260181	2004 RS_{125}	—	September 7, 2004	Kitt Peak	Spacewatch	·	3.3 km	MPC · JPL
260182	2004 RD_{134}	—	September 7, 2004	Kitt Peak	Spacewatch	·	2.5 km	MPC · JPL
260183	2004 RU_{138}	—	September 8, 2004	Palomar	NEAT	·	3.3 km	MPC · JPL
260184	2004 RT_{140}	—	September 8, 2004	Socorro	LINEAR	·	4.3 km	MPC · JPL
260185	2004 RP_{141}	—	September 8, 2004	Socorro	LINEAR	·	2.2 km	MPC · JPL
260186	2004 RM_{142}	—	September 8, 2004	Socorro	LINEAR	T_{j} (2.99)	6.9 km	MPC · JPL
260187	2004 RS_{146}	—	September 9, 2004	Socorro	LINEAR	·	2.5 km	MPC · JPL
260188	2004 RS_{152}	—	September 10, 2004	Socorro	LINEAR	EOS	2.6 km	MPC · JPL
260189	2004 RY_{152}	—	September 10, 2004	Socorro	LINEAR	·	2.8 km	MPC · JPL
260190	2004 RM_{153}	—	September 10, 2004	Socorro	LINEAR	SYL · CYB	6.0 km	MPC · JPL
260191	2004 RP_{154}	—	September 10, 2004	Socorro	LINEAR	·	2.6 km	MPC · JPL
260192	2004 RW_{156}	—	September 10, 2004	Socorro	LINEAR	·	3.6 km	MPC · JPL
260193	2004 RE_{157}	—	September 10, 2004	Socorro	LINEAR	·	4.5 km	MPC · JPL
260194	2004 RJ_{158}	—	September 10, 2004	Socorro	LINEAR	·	3.8 km	MPC · JPL
260195	2004 RB_{159}	—	September 10, 2004	Socorro	LINEAR	EOS	2.6 km	MPC · JPL
260196	2004 RS_{159}	—	September 10, 2004	Socorro	LINEAR	·	3.2 km	MPC · JPL
260197	2004 RG_{163}	—	September 11, 2004	Socorro	LINEAR	·	4.1 km	MPC · JPL
260198	2004 RP_{167}	—	September 7, 2004	Palomar	NEAT	·	3.7 km	MPC · JPL
260199	2004 RQ_{168}	—	September 8, 2004	Socorro	LINEAR	·	3.1 km	MPC · JPL
260200	2004 RT_{169}	—	September 8, 2004	Socorro	LINEAR	·	2.5 km	MPC · JPL

== 260201–260300 ==
back to top

Designation			Discovery			Properties		Ref
Permanent	Provisional	Named after	Date	Site	Discoverer(s)	Category	Diam.	Ref
260201	2004 RH_{171}	—	September 9, 2004	Socorro	LINEAR	EOS	2.5 km	MPC · JPL
260202	2004 RK_{175}	—	September 10, 2004	Socorro	LINEAR	·	3.8 km	MPC · JPL
260203	2004 RB_{179}	—	September 10, 2004	Socorro	LINEAR	EOS	3.0 km	MPC · JPL
260204	2004 RE_{180}	—	September 10, 2004	Socorro	LINEAR	·	4.6 km	MPC · JPL
260205	2004 RK_{181}	—	September 10, 2004	Socorro	LINEAR	·	5.3 km	MPC · JPL
260206	2004 RN_{181}	—	September 10, 2004	Socorro	LINEAR	TIR	3.6 km	MPC · JPL
260207	2004 RS_{184}	—	September 10, 2004	Socorro	LINEAR	EOS	2.7 km	MPC · JPL
260208	2004 RX_{196}	—	September 10, 2004	Socorro	LINEAR	·	4.0 km	MPC · JPL
260209	2004 RB_{197}	—	September 10, 2004	Socorro	LINEAR	·	4.7 km	MPC · JPL
260210	2004 RC_{197}	—	September 10, 2004	Socorro	LINEAR	·	3.4 km	MPC · JPL
260211	2004 RV_{200}	—	September 10, 2004	Socorro	LINEAR	LIX	4.8 km	MPC · JPL
260212	2004 RZ_{204}	—	September 7, 2004	Palomar	NEAT	(18466)	4.1 km	MPC · JPL
260213	2004 RV_{205}	—	September 10, 2004	Socorro	LINEAR	·	5.7 km	MPC · JPL
260214	2004 RN_{207}	—	September 11, 2004	Socorro	LINEAR	·	3.8 km	MPC · JPL
260215	2004 RL_{210}	—	September 11, 2004	Socorro	LINEAR	·	3.6 km	MPC · JPL
260216	2004 RE_{211}	—	September 11, 2004	Socorro	LINEAR	EOS	2.7 km	MPC · JPL
260217	2004 RP_{212}	—	September 11, 2004	Socorro	LINEAR	T_{j} (2.99)	5.5 km	MPC · JPL
260218	2004 RQ_{212}	—	September 11, 2004	Socorro	LINEAR	·	6.7 km	MPC · JPL
260219	2004 RM_{213}	—	September 11, 2004	Socorro	LINEAR	·	4.7 km	MPC · JPL
260220	2004 RN_{214}	—	September 11, 2004	Socorro	LINEAR	·	3.0 km	MPC · JPL
260221	2004 RO_{215}	—	September 11, 2004	Socorro	LINEAR	·	5.8 km	MPC · JPL
260222	2004 RK_{218}	—	September 11, 2004	Socorro	LINEAR	·	3.8 km	MPC · JPL
260223	2004 RY_{228}	—	September 9, 2004	Kitt Peak	Spacewatch	·	3.3 km	MPC · JPL
260224	2004 RU_{230}	—	September 9, 2004	Kitt Peak	Spacewatch	·	2.8 km	MPC · JPL
260225	2004 RR_{231}	—	September 9, 2004	Kitt Peak	Spacewatch	·	3.3 km	MPC · JPL
260226	2004 RO_{236}	—	September 10, 2004	Kitt Peak	Spacewatch	EOS	2.6 km	MPC · JPL
260227	2004 RA_{239}	—	September 10, 2004	Kitt Peak	Spacewatch	·	2.4 km	MPC · JPL
260228	2004 RB_{245}	—	September 10, 2004	Kitt Peak	Spacewatch	·	2.3 km	MPC · JPL
260229	2004 RO_{248}	—	September 12, 2004	Socorro	LINEAR	·	1.6 km	MPC · JPL
260230	2004 RU_{248}	—	September 12, 2004	Socorro	LINEAR	EUP	5.2 km	MPC · JPL
260231	2004 RA_{255}	—	September 6, 2004	Palomar	NEAT	·	4.5 km	MPC · JPL
260232	2004 RZ_{257}	—	September 10, 2004	Socorro	LINEAR	EOS	2.6 km	MPC · JPL
260233	2004 RE_{265}	—	September 10, 2004	Kitt Peak	Spacewatch	·	990 m	MPC · JPL
260234	2004 RK_{282}	—	September 15, 2004	Kitt Peak	Spacewatch	·	630 m	MPC · JPL
260235 Attwood	2004 RU_{289}	Attwood	September 12, 2004	Vail-Jarnac	Jarnac	·	2.7 km	MPC · JPL
260236	2004 RN_{290}	—	September 8, 2004	Socorro	LINEAR	·	2.5 km	MPC · JPL
260237	2004 RZ_{291}	—	September 10, 2004	Socorro	LINEAR	·	3.6 km	MPC · JPL
260238	2004 RV_{308}	—	September 13, 2004	Kitt Peak	Spacewatch	·	2.9 km	MPC · JPL
260239	2004 RM_{309}	—	September 13, 2004	Socorro	LINEAR	·	3.9 km	MPC · JPL
260240	2004 RK_{315}	—	September 15, 2004	Kitt Peak	Spacewatch	·	4.3 km	MPC · JPL
260241	2004 RK_{321}	—	September 13, 2004	Palomar	NEAT	·	2.6 km	MPC · JPL
260242	2004 RE_{322}	—	September 13, 2004	Socorro	LINEAR	·	4.7 km	MPC · JPL
260243	2004 RX_{322}	—	September 13, 2004	Socorro	LINEAR	DOR	3.5 km	MPC · JPL
260244	2004 RY_{325}	—	September 13, 2004	Socorro	LINEAR	·	4.2 km	MPC · JPL
260245	2004 RC_{328}	—	September 15, 2004	Anderson Mesa	LONEOS	·	2.0 km	MPC · JPL
260246	2004 RM_{328}	—	September 15, 2004	Anderson Mesa	LONEOS	·	3.3 km	MPC · JPL
260247	2004 RF_{331}	—	September 15, 2004	Kitt Peak	Spacewatch	AGN	1.4 km	MPC · JPL
260248	2004 RY_{331}	—	September 14, 2004	Palomar	NEAT	·	2.4 km	MPC · JPL
260249	2004 RB_{332}	—	September 14, 2004	Palomar	NEAT	·	2.8 km	MPC · JPL
260250	2004 RE_{333}	—	September 15, 2004	Anderson Mesa	LONEOS	·	3.9 km	MPC · JPL
260251	2004 RM_{340}	—	September 6, 2004	Socorro	LINEAR	·	4.6 km	MPC · JPL
260252	2004 RX_{340}	—	September 7, 2004	Socorro	LINEAR	·	4.2 km	MPC · JPL
260253	2004 RT_{345}	—	September 8, 2004	Socorro	LINEAR	·	3.0 km	MPC · JPL
260254	2004 RE_{347}	—	September 15, 2004	Anderson Mesa	LONEOS	·	4.2 km	MPC · JPL
260255	2004 SU	—	September 17, 2004	Three Buttes	Jones, G. R.	·	3.7 km	MPC · JPL
260256	2004 SB_{2}	—	September 16, 2004	Kitt Peak	Spacewatch	·	2.5 km	MPC · JPL
260257	2004 SC_{4}	—	September 17, 2004	Anderson Mesa	LONEOS	·	4.4 km	MPC · JPL
260258	2004 SS_{8}	—	September 17, 2004	Socorro	LINEAR	·	2.8 km	MPC · JPL
260259	2004 SZ_{11}	—	September 16, 2004	Siding Spring	SSS	·	4.8 km	MPC · JPL
260260	2004 SY_{16}	—	September 17, 2004	Anderson Mesa	LONEOS	TIR	3.7 km	MPC · JPL
260261	2004 SG_{19}	—	September 18, 2004	Socorro	LINEAR	·	4.1 km	MPC · JPL
260262	2004 SK_{20}	—	September 17, 2004	Desert Eagle	W. K. Y. Yeung	·	5.0 km	MPC · JPL
260263	2004 ST_{27}	—	September 16, 2004	Kitt Peak	Spacewatch	KOR	1.5 km	MPC · JPL
260264	2004 SP_{29}	—	September 17, 2004	Socorro	LINEAR	EOS	2.7 km	MPC · JPL
260265	2004 SS_{29}	—	September 17, 2004	Socorro	LINEAR	EOS	2.6 km	MPC · JPL
260266	2004 SA_{35}	—	September 17, 2004	Kitt Peak	Spacewatch	·	3.6 km	MPC · JPL
260267	2004 SD_{35}	—	September 17, 2004	Kitt Peak	Spacewatch	EOS	2.1 km	MPC · JPL
260268	2004 SY_{42}	—	September 18, 2004	Socorro	LINEAR	EOS	2.7 km	MPC · JPL
260269	2004 SB_{50}	—	September 22, 2004	Socorro	LINEAR	·	2.6 km	MPC · JPL
260270	2004 SC_{54}	—	September 22, 2004	Socorro	LINEAR	EOS	2.3 km	MPC · JPL
260271	2004 SK_{55}	—	September 23, 2004	Socorro	LINEAR	·	3.7 km	MPC · JPL
260272	2004 SA_{58}	—	September 16, 2004	Anderson Mesa	LONEOS	·	3.6 km	MPC · JPL
260273	2004 SB_{61}	—	September 21, 2004	Socorro	LINEAR	·	3.0 km	MPC · JPL
260274	2004 TW_{2}	—	October 4, 2004	Kitt Peak	Spacewatch	·	2.6 km	MPC · JPL
260275	2004 TK_{6}	—	October 2, 2004	Palomar	NEAT	LIX	4.5 km	MPC · JPL
260276	2004 TQ_{7}	—	October 5, 2004	Socorro	LINEAR	LIX	6.5 km	MPC · JPL
260277	2004 TR_{12}	—	October 7, 2004	Siding Spring	SSS	ATE +1km	470 m	MPC · JPL
260278	2004 TV_{16}	—	October 8, 2004	Socorro	LINEAR	·	5.5 km	MPC · JPL
260279	2004 TQ_{17}	—	October 10, 2004	Socorro	LINEAR	·	4.2 km	MPC · JPL
260280	2004 TB_{25}	—	October 4, 2004	Kitt Peak	Spacewatch	·	3.1 km	MPC · JPL
260281	2004 TT_{31}	—	October 4, 2004	Anderson Mesa	LONEOS	·	4.4 km	MPC · JPL
260282	2004 TB_{38}	—	October 4, 2004	Kitt Peak	Spacewatch	·	4.3 km	MPC · JPL
260283	2004 TS_{38}	—	October 4, 2004	Kitt Peak	Spacewatch	·	4.4 km	MPC · JPL
260284	2004 TG_{39}	—	October 4, 2004	Kitt Peak	Spacewatch	·	3.0 km	MPC · JPL
260285	2004 TT_{43}	—	October 4, 2004	Kitt Peak	Spacewatch	HYG	3.3 km	MPC · JPL
260286	2004 TB_{51}	—	October 4, 2004	Kitt Peak	Spacewatch	·	4.8 km	MPC · JPL
260287	2004 TY_{56}	—	October 5, 2004	Kitt Peak	Spacewatch	·	3.4 km	MPC · JPL
260288	2004 TE_{58}	—	October 5, 2004	Kitt Peak	Spacewatch	·	3.7 km	MPC · JPL
260289	2004 TC_{59}	—	October 5, 2004	Kitt Peak	Spacewatch	·	3.1 km	MPC · JPL
260290	2004 TN_{65}	—	October 5, 2004	Palomar	NEAT	EOS	3.1 km	MPC · JPL
260291	2004 TZ_{71}	—	October 6, 2004	Kitt Peak	Spacewatch	HYG	3.9 km	MPC · JPL
260292	2004 TB_{78}	—	October 4, 2004	Kitt Peak	Spacewatch	THM	2.8 km	MPC · JPL
260293	2004 TG_{99}	—	October 5, 2004	Kitt Peak	Spacewatch	THM	2.8 km	MPC · JPL
260294	2004 TS_{101}	—	October 6, 2004	Kitt Peak	Spacewatch	·	4.8 km	MPC · JPL
260295	2004 TY_{103}	—	October 7, 2004	Kitt Peak	Spacewatch	·	2.9 km	MPC · JPL
260296	2004 TW_{106}	—	October 7, 2004	Socorro	LINEAR	EOS	2.7 km	MPC · JPL
260297	2004 TG_{109}	—	October 7, 2004	Anderson Mesa	LONEOS	EOS	3.2 km	MPC · JPL
260298	2004 TQ_{112}	—	October 7, 2004	Socorro	LINEAR	T_{j} (2.97)	5.0 km	MPC · JPL
260299	2004 TX_{112}	—	October 7, 2004	Palomar	NEAT	·	5.2 km	MPC · JPL
260300	2004 TT_{113}	—	October 7, 2004	Palomar	NEAT	·	4.1 km	MPC · JPL

== 260301–260400 ==
back to top

Designation			Discovery			Properties		Ref
Permanent	Provisional	Named after	Date	Site	Discoverer(s)	Category	Diam.	Ref
260301	2004 TT_{114}	—	October 8, 2004	Kitt Peak	Spacewatch	KOR	1.6 km	MPC · JPL
260302	2004 TK_{117}	—	October 5, 2004	Anderson Mesa	LONEOS	KOR	2.0 km	MPC · JPL
260303	2004 TJ_{119}	—	October 6, 2004	Socorro	LINEAR	·	3.6 km	MPC · JPL
260304	2004 TM_{119}	—	October 6, 2004	Palomar	NEAT	·	4.1 km	MPC · JPL
260305	2004 TK_{122}	—	October 7, 2004	Anderson Mesa	LONEOS	·	3.4 km	MPC · JPL
260306	2004 TS_{122}	—	October 7, 2004	Anderson Mesa	LONEOS	EOS	3.0 km	MPC · JPL
260307	2004 TE_{123}	—	October 7, 2004	Anderson Mesa	LONEOS	·	5.4 km	MPC · JPL
260308	2004 TJ_{126}	—	October 7, 2004	Socorro	LINEAR	THM	2.7 km	MPC · JPL
260309	2004 TX_{128}	—	October 7, 2004	Socorro	LINEAR	THM	3.8 km	MPC · JPL
260310	2004 TN_{129}	—	October 7, 2004	Socorro	LINEAR	EOS	2.7 km	MPC · JPL
260311	2004 TD_{137}	—	October 8, 2004	Anderson Mesa	LONEOS	EOS	3.2 km	MPC · JPL
260312	2004 TH_{138}	—	October 9, 2004	Anderson Mesa	LONEOS	EOS	2.9 km	MPC · JPL
260313	2004 TB_{139}	—	October 9, 2004	Anderson Mesa	LONEOS	EOS	2.6 km	MPC · JPL
260314	2004 TX_{142}	—	October 4, 2004	Kitt Peak	Spacewatch	·	4.7 km	MPC · JPL
260315	2004 TA_{144}	—	October 4, 2004	Kitt Peak	Spacewatch	·	4.0 km	MPC · JPL
260316	2004 TE_{149}	—	October 6, 2004	Kitt Peak	Spacewatch	·	2.8 km	MPC · JPL
260317	2004 TJ_{151}	—	October 6, 2004	Kitt Peak	Spacewatch	·	2.9 km	MPC · JPL
260318	2004 TC_{153}	—	October 6, 2004	Kitt Peak	Spacewatch	THM	2.4 km	MPC · JPL
260319	2004 TE_{154}	—	October 6, 2004	Kitt Peak	Spacewatch	·	2.6 km	MPC · JPL
260320	2004 TL_{155}	—	October 6, 2004	Kitt Peak	Spacewatch	·	3.8 km	MPC · JPL
260321	2004 TW_{155}	—	October 6, 2004	Kitt Peak	Spacewatch	THM	3.2 km	MPC · JPL
260322	2004 TQ_{156}	—	October 6, 2004	Kitt Peak	Spacewatch	·	3.1 km	MPC · JPL
260323	2004 TD_{162}	—	October 6, 2004	Kitt Peak	Spacewatch	THM	2.5 km	MPC · JPL
260324	2004 TE_{167}	—	October 7, 2004	Kitt Peak	Spacewatch	EOS	2.5 km	MPC · JPL
260325	2004 TL_{172}	—	October 8, 2004	Socorro	LINEAR	·	3.4 km	MPC · JPL
260326	2004 TV_{175}	—	October 9, 2004	Socorro	LINEAR	EOS	3.1 km	MPC · JPL
260327	2004 TQ_{176}	—	October 10, 2004	Socorro	LINEAR	·	3.5 km	MPC · JPL
260328	2004 TJ_{182}	—	October 7, 2004	Kitt Peak	Spacewatch	KOR	1.6 km	MPC · JPL
260329	2004 TE_{193}	—	October 7, 2004	Kitt Peak	Spacewatch	THM	3.2 km	MPC · JPL
260330	2004 TH_{204}	—	October 7, 2004	Kitt Peak	Spacewatch	·	3.7 km	MPC · JPL
260331	2004 TV_{205}	—	October 7, 2004	Kitt Peak	Spacewatch	·	3.4 km	MPC · JPL
260332	2004 TO_{211}	—	October 8, 2004	Kitt Peak	Spacewatch	·	3.3 km	MPC · JPL
260333	2004 TJ_{217}	—	October 5, 2004	Kitt Peak	Spacewatch	·	3.0 km	MPC · JPL
260334	2004 TS_{218}	—	October 5, 2004	Palomar	NEAT	CYB	5.4 km	MPC · JPL
260335	2004 TS_{220}	—	October 6, 2004	Palomar	NEAT	EOS	3.3 km	MPC · JPL
260336	2004 TF_{223}	—	October 7, 2004	Socorro	LINEAR	·	5.2 km	MPC · JPL
260337	2004 TH_{225}	—	October 8, 2004	Kitt Peak	Spacewatch	·	2.6 km	MPC · JPL
260338	2004 TP_{229}	—	October 8, 2004	Kitt Peak	Spacewatch	·	2.9 km	MPC · JPL
260339	2004 TB_{231}	—	October 8, 2004	Kitt Peak	Spacewatch	·	5.6 km	MPC · JPL
260340	2004 TU_{233}	—	October 8, 2004	Kitt Peak	Spacewatch	TIR	4.4 km	MPC · JPL
260341	2004 TG_{243}	—	October 6, 2004	Palomar	NEAT	·	3.6 km	MPC · JPL
260342	2004 TK_{244}	—	October 7, 2004	Kitt Peak	Spacewatch	·	3.5 km	MPC · JPL
260343	2004 TM_{248}	—	October 7, 2004	Kitt Peak	Spacewatch	·	2.2 km	MPC · JPL
260344	2004 TG_{259}	—	October 9, 2004	Kitt Peak	Spacewatch	·	4.2 km	MPC · JPL
260345	2004 TT_{266}	—	October 9, 2004	Kitt Peak	Spacewatch	·	3.5 km	MPC · JPL
260346	2004 TN_{268}	—	October 9, 2004	Kitt Peak	Spacewatch	·	3.9 km	MPC · JPL
260347	2004 TN_{280}	—	October 10, 2004	Kitt Peak	Spacewatch	HYG	3.5 km	MPC · JPL
260348	2004 TG_{283}	—	October 7, 2004	Palomar	NEAT	·	4.5 km	MPC · JPL
260349	2004 TA_{286}	—	October 8, 2004	Kitt Peak	Spacewatch	·	2.2 km	MPC · JPL
260350	2004 TL_{291}	—	October 10, 2004	Kitt Peak	Spacewatch	·	4.4 km	MPC · JPL
260351	2004 TU_{294}	—	October 10, 2004	Palomar	NEAT	EOS	3.1 km	MPC · JPL
260352	2004 TJ_{308}	—	October 10, 2004	Socorro	LINEAR	·	4.0 km	MPC · JPL
260353	2004 TL_{308}	—	October 10, 2004	Socorro	LINEAR	·	3.8 km	MPC · JPL
260354	2004 TZ_{314}	—	October 11, 2004	Kitt Peak	Spacewatch	·	3.9 km	MPC · JPL
260355	2004 TP_{324}	—	October 12, 2004	Anderson Mesa	LONEOS	·	4.4 km	MPC · JPL
260356	2004 TF_{327}	—	October 14, 2004	Palomar	NEAT	·	3.6 km	MPC · JPL
260357	2004 TK_{333}	—	October 9, 2004	Kitt Peak	Spacewatch	THM	3.0 km	MPC · JPL
260358	2004 TP_{337}	—	October 12, 2004	Kitt Peak	Spacewatch	THM	2.4 km	MPC · JPL
260359	2004 TF_{340}	—	October 13, 2004	Kitt Peak	Spacewatch	·	3.1 km	MPC · JPL
260360	2004 TZ_{346}	—	October 15, 2004	Anderson Mesa	LONEOS	·	4.4 km	MPC · JPL
260361	2004 TO_{353}	—	October 11, 2004	Kitt Peak	M. W. Buie	·	1.6 km	MPC · JPL
260362	2004 TG_{357}	—	October 14, 2004	Anderson Mesa	LONEOS	·	3.7 km	MPC · JPL
260363	2004 TR_{360}	—	October 10, 2004	Kitt Peak	Spacewatch	·	2.2 km	MPC · JPL
260364	2004 TP_{370}	—	October 8, 2004	Anderson Mesa	LONEOS	·	4.0 km	MPC · JPL
260365	2004 UK_{3}	—	October 19, 2004	Socorro	LINEAR	·	2.9 km	MPC · JPL
260366 Quanah	2004 US_{3}	Quanah	October 28, 2004	Needville	J. Dellinger	·	5.4 km	MPC · JPL
260367	2004 UN_{6}	—	October 20, 2004	Socorro	LINEAR	·	4.9 km	MPC · JPL
260368	2004 UU_{8}	—	October 23, 2004	Socorro	LINEAR	·	4.4 km	MPC · JPL
260369	2004 UY_{10}	—	October 24, 2004	Anderson Mesa	LONEOS	·	5.7 km	MPC · JPL
260370	2004 VN	—	November 2, 2004	Desert Eagle	W. K. Y. Yeung	3:2 · SHU	8.5 km	MPC · JPL
260371	2004 VQ_{4}	—	November 3, 2004	Anderson Mesa	LONEOS	·	4.3 km	MPC · JPL
260372	2004 VA_{7}	—	November 3, 2004	Kitt Peak	Spacewatch	EOS	2.9 km	MPC · JPL
260373	2004 VV_{13}	—	November 3, 2004	Catalina	CSS	·	5.2 km	MPC · JPL
260374	2004 VL_{16}	—	November 6, 2004	Siding Spring	SSS	T_{j} (2.95)	4.6 km	MPC · JPL
260375	2004 VO_{17}	—	November 3, 2004	Kitt Peak	Spacewatch	VER	4.1 km	MPC · JPL
260376	2004 VK_{18}	—	November 4, 2004	Kitt Peak	Spacewatch	T_{j} (2.95)	6.0 km	MPC · JPL
260377	2004 VB_{31}	—	November 3, 2004	Kitt Peak	Spacewatch	EOS	2.6 km	MPC · JPL
260378	2004 VM_{32}	—	November 3, 2004	Kitt Peak	Spacewatch	KOR	1.7 km	MPC · JPL
260379	2004 VK_{33}	—	November 3, 2004	Kitt Peak	Spacewatch	·	4.7 km	MPC · JPL
260380	2004 VU_{33}	—	November 3, 2004	Kitt Peak	Spacewatch	·	4.0 km	MPC · JPL
260381	2004 VF_{37}	—	November 4, 2004	Kitt Peak	Spacewatch	·	4.2 km	MPC · JPL
260382	2004 VF_{38}	—	November 4, 2004	Kitt Peak	Spacewatch	·	5.5 km	MPC · JPL
260383	2004 VV_{40}	—	November 4, 2004	Kitt Peak	Spacewatch	·	2.0 km	MPC · JPL
260384	2004 VP_{60}	—	November 10, 2004	Wrightwood	J. W. Young	·	4.8 km	MPC · JPL
260385	2004 VG_{61}	—	November 5, 2004	Palomar	NEAT	·	4.4 km	MPC · JPL
260386	2004 VM_{61}	—	November 5, 2004	Palomar	NEAT	TIR	3.6 km	MPC · JPL
260387	2004 VB_{64}	—	November 5, 2004	Anderson Mesa	LONEOS	·	4.5 km	MPC · JPL
260388	2004 VP_{65}	—	November 13, 2004	Charleston	R. Holmes	·	4.5 km	MPC · JPL
260389	2004 VP_{70}	—	November 4, 2004	Catalina	CSS	·	3.4 km	MPC · JPL
260390	2004 VX_{70}	—	November 7, 2004	Socorro	LINEAR	·	5.6 km	MPC · JPL
260391	2004 VG_{73}	—	November 5, 2004	Palomar	NEAT	·	4.4 km	MPC · JPL
260392	2004 VL_{74}	—	November 12, 2004	Catalina	CSS	HYG	5.1 km	MPC · JPL
260393	2004 VD_{77}	—	November 12, 2004	Catalina	CSS	·	3.0 km	MPC · JPL
260394	2004 VK_{91}	—	November 3, 2004	Palomar	NEAT	T_{j} (2.98)	4.9 km	MPC · JPL
260395	2004 WJ_{3}	—	November 17, 2004	Siding Spring	SSS	HYG	4.0 km	MPC · JPL
260396	2004 WK_{3}	—	November 17, 2004	Campo Imperatore	CINEOS	·	3.6 km	MPC · JPL
260397	2004 XJ_{1}	—	December 1, 2004	Catalina	CSS	URS	5.5 km	MPC · JPL
260398	2004 XP_{1}	—	December 1, 2004	Catalina	CSS	·	4.4 km	MPC · JPL
260399	2004 XA_{2}	—	December 1, 2004	Palomar	NEAT	·	4.2 km	MPC · JPL
260400	2004 XL_{3}	—	December 2, 2004	Catalina	CSS	·	5.8 km	MPC · JPL

== 260401–260500 ==
back to top

Designation			Discovery			Properties		Ref
Permanent	Provisional	Named after	Date	Site	Discoverer(s)	Category	Diam.	Ref
260401	2004 XW_{3}	—	December 2, 2004	Socorro	LINEAR	·	5.0 km	MPC · JPL
260402	2004 XS_{6}	—	December 2, 2004	Socorro	LINEAR	·	4.9 km	MPC · JPL
260403	2004 XG_{7}	—	December 2, 2004	Socorro	LINEAR	TIR	3.3 km	MPC · JPL
260404	2004 XS_{7}	—	December 2, 2004	Palomar	NEAT	ARM	5.6 km	MPC · JPL
260405	2004 XQ_{9}	—	December 2, 2004	Catalina	CSS	VER	4.3 km	MPC · JPL
260406	2004 XA_{11}	—	December 3, 2004	Kitt Peak	Spacewatch	·	1.1 km	MPC · JPL
260407	2004 XZ_{11}	—	December 7, 2004	Socorro	LINEAR	URS	6.5 km	MPC · JPL
260408	2004 XV_{17}	—	December 7, 2004	Socorro	LINEAR	·	4.6 km	MPC · JPL
260409	2004 XL_{18}	—	December 8, 2004	Socorro	LINEAR	HYG	4.7 km	MPC · JPL
260410	2004 XT_{22}	—	December 8, 2004	Socorro	LINEAR	·	4.4 km	MPC · JPL
260411	2004 XW_{23}	—	December 9, 2004	Socorro	LINEAR	·	4.3 km	MPC · JPL
260412	2004 XS_{27}	—	December 10, 2004	Socorro	LINEAR	THM	3.3 km	MPC · JPL
260413	2004 XZ_{28}	—	December 10, 2004	Kitt Peak	Spacewatch	·	940 m	MPC · JPL
260414	2004 XC_{32}	—	December 10, 2004	Socorro	LINEAR	·	4.0 km	MPC · JPL
260415	2004 XH_{52}	—	December 8, 2004	Socorro	LINEAR	·	1.1 km	MPC · JPL
260416	2004 XV_{54}	—	December 10, 2004	Socorro	LINEAR	·	4.7 km	MPC · JPL
260417	2004 XE_{56}	—	December 10, 2004	Kitt Peak	Spacewatch	·	4.4 km	MPC · JPL
260418	2004 XU_{60}	—	December 12, 2004	Kitt Peak	Spacewatch	·	950 m	MPC · JPL
260419	2004 XC_{65}	—	December 2, 2004	Palomar	NEAT	fast	4.5 km	MPC · JPL
260420	2004 XY_{74}	—	December 9, 2004	Catalina	CSS	·	2.4 km	MPC · JPL
260421	2004 XZ_{74}	—	December 9, 2004	Catalina	CSS	EOS	3.2 km	MPC · JPL
260422	2004 XL_{77}	—	December 10, 2004	Vail-Jarnac	Jarnac	(43176)	3.5 km	MPC · JPL
260423	2004 XV_{79}	—	December 10, 2004	Socorro	LINEAR	THM	3.4 km	MPC · JPL
260424	2004 XQ_{81}	—	December 10, 2004	Socorro	LINEAR	·	4.7 km	MPC · JPL
260425	2004 XA_{91}	—	December 11, 2004	Kitt Peak	Spacewatch	HYG	4.7 km	MPC · JPL
260426	2004 XT_{98}	—	December 11, 2004	Kitt Peak	Spacewatch	THM	3.4 km	MPC · JPL
260427	2004 XZ_{99}	—	December 12, 2004	Kitt Peak	Spacewatch	·	1.0 km	MPC · JPL
260428	2004 XR_{101}	—	December 14, 2004	Catalina	CSS	V	1.0 km	MPC · JPL
260429	2004 XR_{104}	—	December 10, 2004	Kitt Peak	Spacewatch	T_{j} (2.98)	5.9 km	MPC · JPL
260430	2004 XS_{104}	—	December 10, 2004	Kitt Peak	Spacewatch	·	880 m	MPC · JPL
260431	2004 XB_{106}	—	December 11, 2004	Socorro	LINEAR	·	6.2 km	MPC · JPL
260432	2004 XN_{109}	—	December 13, 2004	Kitt Peak	Spacewatch	EOS	3.1 km	MPC · JPL
260433	2004 XB_{111}	—	December 14, 2004	Catalina	CSS	URS	4.9 km	MPC · JPL
260434	2004 XQ_{114}	—	December 10, 2004	Campo Imperatore	CINEOS	·	3.5 km	MPC · JPL
260435	2004 XO_{119}	—	December 12, 2004	Kitt Peak	Spacewatch	·	1.9 km	MPC · JPL
260436	2004 XJ_{123}	—	December 10, 2004	Socorro	LINEAR	·	4.5 km	MPC · JPL
260437	2004 XO_{128}	—	December 14, 2004	Socorro	LINEAR	V	860 m	MPC · JPL
260438	2004 XH_{130}	—	December 15, 2004	Socorro	LINEAR	TIR	2.7 km	MPC · JPL
260439	2004 XG_{134}	—	December 15, 2004	Socorro	LINEAR	·	3.9 km	MPC · JPL
260440	2004 XS_{137}	—	December 11, 2004	Socorro	LINEAR	·	5.8 km	MPC · JPL
260441	2004 XN_{155}	—	December 12, 2004	Kitt Peak	Spacewatch	·	730 m	MPC · JPL
260442	2004 XB_{164}	—	December 3, 2004	Anderson Mesa	LONEOS	·	6.6 km	MPC · JPL
260443	2004 XC_{165}	—	December 2, 2004	Kitt Peak	Spacewatch	·	1.7 km	MPC · JPL
260444	2004 XH_{166}	—	December 2, 2004	Catalina	CSS	HYG	3.6 km	MPC · JPL
260445	2004 XE_{167}	—	December 3, 2004	Anderson Mesa	LONEOS	·	4.7 km	MPC · JPL
260446	2004 YQ_{3}	—	December 16, 2004	Anderson Mesa	LONEOS	·	4.2 km	MPC · JPL
260447	2004 YW_{12}	—	December 18, 2004	Mount Lemmon	Mount Lemmon Survey	·	960 m	MPC · JPL
260448	2004 YA_{35}	—	December 19, 2004	Anderson Mesa	LONEOS	·	2.7 km	MPC · JPL
260449	2005 AV_{4}	—	January 6, 2005	Catalina	CSS	·	740 m	MPC · JPL
260450	2005 AX_{5}	—	January 6, 2005	Catalina	CSS	·	1.0 km	MPC · JPL
260451	2005 AZ_{7}	—	January 6, 2005	Catalina	CSS	·	1.2 km	MPC · JPL
260452	2005 AW_{14}	—	January 6, 2005	Catalina	CSS	·	2.9 km	MPC · JPL
260453	2005 AJ_{25}	—	January 8, 2005	Campo Imperatore	CINEOS	·	1.6 km	MPC · JPL
260454	2005 AL_{29}	—	January 15, 2005	Kvistaberg	Uppsala-DLR Asteroid Survey	·	850 m	MPC · JPL
260455	2005 AQ_{31}	—	January 11, 2005	Socorro	LINEAR	(2076)	960 m	MPC · JPL
260456	2005 AT_{41}	—	January 15, 2005	Socorro	LINEAR	·	1.4 km	MPC · JPL
260457	2005 AQ_{43}	—	January 15, 2005	Socorro	LINEAR	·	1.3 km	MPC · JPL
260458	2005 AN_{50}	—	January 13, 2005	Socorro	LINEAR	EOS	2.7 km	MPC · JPL
260459	2005 AR_{54}	—	January 15, 2005	Catalina	CSS	·	5.6 km	MPC · JPL
260460	2005 AH_{57}	—	January 15, 2005	Anderson Mesa	LONEOS	·	1.9 km	MPC · JPL
260461	2005 AE_{60}	—	January 15, 2005	Kitt Peak	Spacewatch	·	1.5 km	MPC · JPL
260462	2005 AX_{75}	—	January 15, 2005	Kitt Peak	Spacewatch	·	1.4 km	MPC · JPL
260463	2005 AN_{77}	—	January 15, 2005	Kitt Peak	Spacewatch	·	1.3 km	MPC · JPL
260464	2005 AD_{78}	—	January 15, 2005	Kitt Peak	Spacewatch	T_{j} (2.98) · 3:2	5.9 km	MPC · JPL
260465	2005 BZ_{3}	—	January 16, 2005	Desert Eagle	W. K. Y. Yeung	·	3.7 km	MPC · JPL
260466	2005 BM_{8}	—	January 16, 2005	Socorro	LINEAR	·	5.0 km	MPC · JPL
260467	2005 BX_{8}	—	January 16, 2005	Socorro	LINEAR	V	880 m	MPC · JPL
260468	2005 BQ_{9}	—	January 16, 2005	Kitt Peak	Spacewatch	·	810 m	MPC · JPL
260469	2005 BT_{11}	—	January 16, 2005	Kitt Peak	Spacewatch	·	910 m	MPC · JPL
260470	2005 BB_{21}	—	January 16, 2005	Socorro	LINEAR	·	7.9 km	MPC · JPL
260471	2005 BT_{25}	—	January 18, 2005	Catalina	CSS	·	1.1 km	MPC · JPL
260472	2005 BE_{27}	—	January 29, 2005	Socorro	LINEAR	T_{j} (2.99) · EUP	6.9 km	MPC · JPL
260473	2005 BH_{28}	—	January 31, 2005	Goodricke-Pigott	R. A. Tucker	·	7.3 km	MPC · JPL
260474	2005 BN_{48}	—	January 19, 2005	Kitt Peak	Spacewatch	NYS	1.2 km	MPC · JPL
260475	2005 CA_{5}	—	February 1, 2005	Palomar	NEAT	·	1.1 km	MPC · JPL
260476	2005 CA_{6}	—	February 1, 2005	Kitt Peak	Spacewatch	·	1.6 km	MPC · JPL
260477	2005 CO_{6}	—	February 1, 2005	Palomar	NEAT	·	1.3 km	MPC · JPL
260478	2005 CW_{7}	—	February 4, 2005	Palomar	NEAT	·	2.4 km	MPC · JPL
260479	2005 CO_{9}	—	February 1, 2005	Kitt Peak	Spacewatch	·	1.2 km	MPC · JPL
260480	2005 CZ_{18}	—	February 2, 2005	Catalina	CSS	·	1.8 km	MPC · JPL
260481	2005 CW_{19}	—	February 2, 2005	Kitt Peak	Spacewatch	NYS	1.5 km	MPC · JPL
260482	2005 CV_{32}	—	February 2, 2005	Kitt Peak	Spacewatch	NYS	1.1 km	MPC · JPL
260483	2005 CO_{38}	—	February 9, 2005	Gnosca	S. Sposetti	·	990 m	MPC · JPL
260484	2005 CP_{42}	—	February 2, 2005	Kitt Peak	Spacewatch	·	710 m	MPC · JPL
260485	2005 CB_{47}	—	February 2, 2005	Kitt Peak	Spacewatch	V	2.3 km	MPC · JPL
260486	2005 CC_{51}	—	February 2, 2005	Kitt Peak	Spacewatch	·	1.0 km	MPC · JPL
260487	2005 CE_{58}	—	February 2, 2005	Catalina	CSS	V	960 m	MPC · JPL
260488	2005 CY_{58}	—	February 2, 2005	Catalina	CSS	·	4.1 km	MPC · JPL
260489	2005 CT_{62}	—	February 9, 2005	Kitt Peak	Spacewatch	·	930 m	MPC · JPL
260490	2005 CY_{66}	—	February 9, 2005	Socorro	LINEAR	MAS	1.1 km	MPC · JPL
260491	2005 CV_{73}	—	February 1, 2005	Kitt Peak	Spacewatch	CYB	5.4 km	MPC · JPL
260492	2005 CT_{78}	—	February 9, 2005	Socorro	LINEAR	NYS	1.4 km	MPC · JPL
260493	2005 EO_{2}	—	March 3, 2005	Vail-Jarnac	Jarnac	·	1.7 km	MPC · JPL
260494	2005 EW_{4}	—	March 1, 2005	Kitt Peak	Spacewatch	·	1.4 km	MPC · JPL
260495	2005 EH_{6}	—	March 1, 2005	Kitt Peak	Spacewatch	·	1.5 km	MPC · JPL
260496	2005 EG_{9}	—	March 2, 2005	Kitt Peak	Spacewatch	·	1.2 km	MPC · JPL
260497	2005 EC_{10}	—	March 2, 2005	Kitt Peak	Spacewatch	·	1.3 km	MPC · JPL
260498	2005 EA_{14}	—	March 3, 2005	Kitt Peak	Spacewatch	·	1.5 km	MPC · JPL
260499	2005 EU_{17}	—	March 3, 2005	Kitt Peak	Spacewatch	·	1.1 km	MPC · JPL
260500	2005 EC_{19}	—	March 3, 2005	Kitt Peak	Spacewatch	·	730 m	MPC · JPL

== 260501–260600 ==
back to top

Designation			Discovery			Properties		Ref
Permanent	Provisional	Named after	Date	Site	Discoverer(s)	Category	Diam.	Ref
260501	2005 EZ_{22}	—	March 3, 2005	Catalina	CSS	·	1 km	MPC · JPL
260502	2005 ED_{23}	—	March 3, 2005	Catalina	CSS	·	1.1 km	MPC · JPL
260503	2005 EJ_{23}	—	March 3, 2005	Catalina	CSS	·	970 m	MPC · JPL
260504	2005 EL_{32}	—	March 3, 2005	Catalina	CSS	·	4.2 km	MPC · JPL
260505	2005 EX_{32}	—	March 5, 2005	Kitami	K. Endate	·	1.4 km	MPC · JPL
260506	2005 EL_{45}	—	March 3, 2005	Catalina	CSS	NYS	1.4 km	MPC · JPL
260507	2005 EB_{50}	—	March 3, 2005	Catalina	CSS	·	980 m	MPC · JPL
260508 Alagna	2005 EU_{51}	Alagna	March 3, 2005	Nogales	J.-C. Merlin	·	1.5 km	MPC · JPL
260509	2005 EJ_{55}	—	March 4, 2005	Kitt Peak	Spacewatch	·	1.1 km	MPC · JPL
260510	2005 EG_{61}	—	March 4, 2005	Catalina	CSS	·	1.5 km	MPC · JPL
260511	2005 EF_{62}	—	March 4, 2005	Socorro	LINEAR	·	720 m	MPC · JPL
260512	2005 EL_{64}	—	March 4, 2005	Mount Lemmon	Mount Lemmon Survey	·	1.2 km	MPC · JPL
260513	2005 ET_{71}	—	March 2, 2005	Catalina	CSS	·	1.1 km	MPC · JPL
260514	2005 EV_{74}	—	March 3, 2005	Kitt Peak	Spacewatch	·	1.3 km	MPC · JPL
260515	2005 EK_{78}	—	March 3, 2005	Catalina	CSS	·	1.2 km	MPC · JPL
260516	2005 EB_{83}	—	March 4, 2005	Kitt Peak	Spacewatch	·	1.4 km	MPC · JPL
260517	2005 EA_{92}	—	March 8, 2005	Anderson Mesa	LONEOS	·	880 m	MPC · JPL
260518	2005 EJ_{92}	—	March 8, 2005	Anderson Mesa	LONEOS	·	1.0 km	MPC · JPL
260519	2005 ED_{95}	—	March 3, 2005	Catalina	CSS	·	1.0 km	MPC · JPL
260520	2005 EW_{97}	—	March 3, 2005	Catalina	CSS	·	1.6 km	MPC · JPL
260521	2005 ED_{99}	—	March 3, 2005	Catalina	CSS	·	1.4 km	MPC · JPL
260522	2005 EV_{101}	—	March 3, 2005	Kitt Peak	Spacewatch	·	1.5 km	MPC · JPL
260523	2005 EA_{109}	—	March 4, 2005	Catalina	CSS	slow	1.2 km	MPC · JPL
260524	2005 EL_{115}	—	March 4, 2005	Mount Lemmon	Mount Lemmon Survey	·	1.5 km	MPC · JPL
260525	2005 EK_{116}	—	March 4, 2005	Mount Lemmon	Mount Lemmon Survey	·	1.5 km	MPC · JPL
260526	2005 EV_{117}	—	March 7, 2005	La Silla	Gauderon, R., Behrend, R.	·	2.0 km	MPC · JPL
260527	2005 EN_{121}	—	March 8, 2005	Anderson Mesa	LONEOS	·	1.5 km	MPC · JPL
260528	2005 EU_{126}	—	March 8, 2005	Mount Lemmon	Mount Lemmon Survey	BAP	1.1 km	MPC · JPL
260529	2005 EL_{132}	—	March 9, 2005	Anderson Mesa	LONEOS	·	710 m	MPC · JPL
260530	2005 EX_{133}	—	March 9, 2005	Socorro	LINEAR	NYS	1.4 km	MPC · JPL
260531	2005 EV_{139}	—	March 9, 2005	Mount Lemmon	Mount Lemmon Survey	·	1.1 km	MPC · JPL
260532	2005 EO_{140}	—	March 10, 2005	Mount Lemmon	Mount Lemmon Survey	·	920 m	MPC · JPL
260533	2005 EF_{143}	—	March 10, 2005	Catalina	CSS	·	1.2 km	MPC · JPL
260534	2005 EB_{145}	—	March 10, 2005	Mount Lemmon	Mount Lemmon Survey	·	1.0 km	MPC · JPL
260535	2005 EA_{148}	—	March 10, 2005	Kitt Peak	Spacewatch	·	2.2 km	MPC · JPL
260536	2005 EG_{150}	—	March 10, 2005	Kitt Peak	Spacewatch	·	1.1 km	MPC · JPL
260537	2005 ER_{150}	—	March 10, 2005	Kitt Peak	Spacewatch	·	1.7 km	MPC · JPL
260538	2005 ED_{152}	—	March 10, 2005	Kitt Peak	Spacewatch	·	1.3 km	MPC · JPL
260539	2005 EB_{154}	—	March 7, 2005	Socorro	LINEAR	·	2.4 km	MPC · JPL
260540	2005 EJ_{154}	—	March 8, 2005	Mount Lemmon	Mount Lemmon Survey	·	1.1 km	MPC · JPL
260541	2005 EG_{160}	—	March 9, 2005	Mount Lemmon	Mount Lemmon Survey	·	1.5 km	MPC · JPL
260542	2005 EU_{160}	—	March 9, 2005	Mount Lemmon	Mount Lemmon Survey	·	1.2 km	MPC · JPL
260543	2005 EE_{165}	—	March 11, 2005	Kitt Peak	Spacewatch	·	1.2 km	MPC · JPL
260544	2005 EE_{177}	—	March 8, 2005	Mount Lemmon	Mount Lemmon Survey	NYS	1.3 km	MPC · JPL
260545	2005 ET_{180}	—	March 9, 2005	Mount Lemmon	Mount Lemmon Survey	VER	4.1 km	MPC · JPL
260546	2005 EG_{181}	—	March 9, 2005	Socorro	LINEAR	·	1.4 km	MPC · JPL
260547	2005 EP_{182}	—	March 9, 2005	Anderson Mesa	LONEOS	·	1.3 km	MPC · JPL
260548	2005 ED_{185}	—	March 9, 2005	Kitt Peak	Spacewatch	V	740 m	MPC · JPL
260549	2005 EK_{185}	—	March 9, 2005	Siding Spring	SSS	·	2.5 km	MPC · JPL
260550	2005 EE_{187}	—	March 10, 2005	Mount Lemmon	Mount Lemmon Survey	·	970 m	MPC · JPL
260551	2005 EN_{187}	—	March 10, 2005	Mount Lemmon	Mount Lemmon Survey	NYS	1.3 km	MPC · JPL
260552	2005 ED_{188}	—	March 10, 2005	Mount Lemmon	Mount Lemmon Survey	V	790 m	MPC · JPL
260553	2005 EF_{194}	—	March 11, 2005	Mount Lemmon	Mount Lemmon Survey	·	1.2 km	MPC · JPL
260554	2005 EN_{199}	—	March 12, 2005	Socorro	LINEAR	V	850 m	MPC · JPL
260555	2005 EV_{199}	—	March 12, 2005	Kitt Peak	Spacewatch	·	840 m	MPC · JPL
260556	2005 EJ_{200}	—	March 12, 2005	Anderson Mesa	LONEOS	·	3.9 km	MPC · JPL
260557	2005 EQ_{204}	—	March 11, 2005	Mount Lemmon	Mount Lemmon Survey	NYS	1.4 km	MPC · JPL
260558	2005 EG_{211}	—	March 4, 2005	Catalina	CSS	(2076)	930 m	MPC · JPL
260559	2005 EH_{211}	—	March 4, 2005	Catalina	CSS	·	1.0 km	MPC · JPL
260560	2005 EY_{211}	—	March 4, 2005	Socorro	LINEAR	·	1.0 km	MPC · JPL
260561	2005 EE_{212}	—	March 4, 2005	Socorro	LINEAR	·	1.2 km	MPC · JPL
260562	2005 EL_{212}	—	March 4, 2005	Socorro	LINEAR	·	1.2 km	MPC · JPL
260563	2005 EV_{216}	—	March 9, 2005	Anderson Mesa	LONEOS	·	1.5 km	MPC · JPL
260564	2005 EH_{220}	—	March 11, 2005	Kitt Peak	Spacewatch	·	810 m	MPC · JPL
260565	2005 ET_{223}	—	March 12, 2005	Kitt Peak	Spacewatch	·	1.2 km	MPC · JPL
260566	2005 ET_{243}	—	March 11, 2005	Kitt Peak	Spacewatch	·	1.3 km	MPC · JPL
260567	2005 EC_{251}	—	March 10, 2005	Anderson Mesa	LONEOS	·	2.4 km	MPC · JPL
260568	2005 EW_{258}	—	March 11, 2005	Mount Lemmon	Mount Lemmon Survey	NYS	1.2 km	MPC · JPL
260569	2005 EM_{259}	—	March 11, 2005	Mount Lemmon	Mount Lemmon Survey	·	680 m	MPC · JPL
260570	2005 EE_{263}	—	March 13, 2005	Kitt Peak	Spacewatch	·	1.3 km	MPC · JPL
260571	2005 EJ_{263}	—	March 13, 2005	Kitt Peak	Spacewatch	·	1.0 km	MPC · JPL
260572	2005 ET_{263}	—	March 13, 2005	Mount Lemmon	Mount Lemmon Survey	·	1.0 km	MPC · JPL
260573	2005 EX_{265}	—	March 13, 2005	Catalina	CSS	·	1.2 km	MPC · JPL
260574	2005 EO_{266}	—	March 13, 2005	Kitt Peak	Spacewatch	·	1.5 km	MPC · JPL
260575	2005 EZ_{267}	—	March 14, 2005	Mount Lemmon	Mount Lemmon Survey	NYS	1.2 km	MPC · JPL
260576	2005 EN_{268}	—	March 14, 2005	Mount Lemmon	Mount Lemmon Survey	·	1.4 km	MPC · JPL
260577	2005 EM_{269}	—	March 15, 2005	Mount Lemmon	Mount Lemmon Survey	·	1.6 km	MPC · JPL
260578	2005 EE_{270}	—	March 12, 2005	Socorro	LINEAR	·	1.0 km	MPC · JPL
260579	2005 ES_{274}	—	March 11, 2005	Kitt Peak	Spacewatch	·	870 m	MPC · JPL
260580	2005 EZ_{274}	—	March 8, 2005	Anderson Mesa	LONEOS	·	770 m	MPC · JPL
260581	2005 EY_{275}	—	March 8, 2005	Anderson Mesa	LONEOS	·	1.1 km	MPC · JPL
260582	2005 ES_{278}	—	March 9, 2005	Kitt Peak	Spacewatch	·	1.3 km	MPC · JPL
260583	2005 EU_{283}	—	March 11, 2005	Kitt Peak	Spacewatch	NYS	1.2 km	MPC · JPL
260584	2005 EO_{285}	—	March 13, 2005	Kitt Peak	Spacewatch	NYS	1.3 km	MPC · JPL
260585	2005 EJ_{287}	—	March 5, 2005	Wise	Wise	MAS	860 m	MPC · JPL
260586	2005 EK_{292}	—	March 10, 2005	Catalina	CSS	·	1.1 km	MPC · JPL
260587	2005 EP_{306}	—	March 8, 2005	Mount Lemmon	Mount Lemmon Survey	·	1.6 km	MPC · JPL
260588	2005 EE_{308}	—	March 8, 2005	Mount Lemmon	Mount Lemmon Survey	·	850 m	MPC · JPL
260589	2005 EY_{310}	—	March 10, 2005	Mount Lemmon	Mount Lemmon Survey	·	760 m	MPC · JPL
260590	2005 ER_{312}	—	March 10, 2005	Kitt Peak	M. W. Buie	·	810 m	MPC · JPL
260591	2005 EO_{324}	—	March 11, 2005	Mount Lemmon	Mount Lemmon Survey	·	1.4 km	MPC · JPL
260592	2005 EM_{325}	—	March 12, 2005	Kitt Peak	Spacewatch	·	1.1 km	MPC · JPL
260593	2005 FA_{4}	—	March 18, 2005	Catalina	CSS	·	1.9 km	MPC · JPL
260594	2005 FQ_{6}	—	March 30, 2005	Catalina	CSS	V	930 m	MPC · JPL
260595	2005 FR_{7}	—	March 30, 2005	Catalina	CSS	EUN	1.6 km	MPC · JPL
260596	2005 FG_{11}	—	March 16, 2005	Catalina	CSS	(2076)	1.3 km	MPC · JPL
260597	2005 FM_{11}	—	March 31, 2005	Kitt Peak	Spacewatch	·	1.1 km	MPC · JPL
260598	2005 GO_{1}	—	April 1, 2005	Catalina	CSS	·	1.3 km	MPC · JPL
260599	2005 GJ_{5}	—	April 1, 2005	Kitt Peak	Spacewatch	·	2.0 km	MPC · JPL
260600	2005 GE_{6}	—	April 1, 2005	Kitt Peak	Spacewatch	·	930 m	MPC · JPL

== 260601–260700 ==
back to top

Designation			Discovery			Properties		Ref
Permanent	Provisional	Named after	Date	Site	Discoverer(s)	Category	Diam.	Ref
260601 Wesselényi	2005 GP_{8}	Wesselényi	April 2, 2005	Piszkéstető	K. Sárneczky	·	570 m	MPC · JPL
260602	2005 GJ_{12}	—	April 1, 2005	Kitt Peak	Spacewatch	MAS	1.1 km	MPC · JPL
260603	2005 GY_{12}	—	April 1, 2005	Anderson Mesa	LONEOS	·	1.1 km	MPC · JPL
260604	2005 GE_{13}	—	April 1, 2005	Anderson Mesa	LONEOS	NYS	1.9 km	MPC · JPL
260605	2005 GS_{15}	—	April 2, 2005	Mount Lemmon	Mount Lemmon Survey	·	760 m	MPC · JPL
260606	2005 GT_{16}	—	April 2, 2005	Palomar	NEAT	·	750 m	MPC · JPL
260607	2005 GY_{18}	—	April 2, 2005	Palomar	NEAT	·	1.0 km	MPC · JPL
260608	2005 GN_{19}	—	April 2, 2005	Mount Lemmon	Mount Lemmon Survey	·	1.5 km	MPC · JPL
260609	2005 GH_{20}	—	April 2, 2005	Anderson Mesa	LONEOS	·	770 m	MPC · JPL
260610	2005 GN_{23}	—	April 1, 2005	Kitt Peak	Spacewatch	·	1.5 km	MPC · JPL
260611	2005 GY_{24}	—	April 2, 2005	Mount Lemmon	Mount Lemmon Survey	·	580 m	MPC · JPL
260612	2005 GH_{28}	—	April 4, 2005	Kitt Peak	Spacewatch	·	1.3 km	MPC · JPL
260613	2005 GM_{28}	—	April 4, 2005	Mount Lemmon	Mount Lemmon Survey	HIL · 3:2	8.9 km	MPC · JPL
260614	2005 GU_{29}	—	April 4, 2005	Catalina	CSS	V	890 m	MPC · JPL
260615	2005 GL_{35}	—	April 2, 2005	Mount Lemmon	Mount Lemmon Survey	·	2.4 km	MPC · JPL
260616	2005 GK_{40}	—	April 4, 2005	Mount Lemmon	Mount Lemmon Survey	·	1.0 km	MPC · JPL
260617	2005 GD_{42}	—	April 5, 2005	Mount Lemmon	Mount Lemmon Survey	·	870 m	MPC · JPL
260618	2005 GU_{45}	—	April 5, 2005	Mount Lemmon	Mount Lemmon Survey	·	770 m	MPC · JPL
260619	2005 GU_{48}	—	April 5, 2005	Mount Lemmon	Mount Lemmon Survey	·	990 m	MPC · JPL
260620	2005 GX_{48}	—	April 5, 2005	Mount Lemmon	Mount Lemmon Survey	NYS	1.1 km	MPC · JPL
260621	2005 GS_{58}	—	April 1, 2005	Anderson Mesa	LONEOS	·	890 m	MPC · JPL
260622	2005 GY_{62}	—	April 2, 2005	Catalina	CSS	·	1.1 km	MPC · JPL
260623	2005 GV_{71}	—	April 4, 2005	Mount Lemmon	Mount Lemmon Survey	·	1.6 km	MPC · JPL
260624	2005 GA_{74}	—	April 4, 2005	Catalina	CSS	·	2.4 km	MPC · JPL
260625	2005 GV_{74}	—	April 5, 2005	Catalina	CSS	NYS	1.5 km	MPC · JPL
260626	2005 GM_{75}	—	April 5, 2005	Socorro	LINEAR	·	1.6 km	MPC · JPL
260627	2005 GW_{76}	—	April 5, 2005	Mount Lemmon	Mount Lemmon Survey	·	1.6 km	MPC · JPL
260628	2005 GX_{77}	—	April 6, 2005	Catalina	CSS	·	3.6 km	MPC · JPL
260629	2005 GL_{80}	—	April 7, 2005	Kitt Peak	Spacewatch	·	1.5 km	MPC · JPL
260630	2005 GA_{95}	—	April 6, 2005	Kitt Peak	Spacewatch	MAS	910 m	MPC · JPL
260631	2005 GG_{95}	—	April 6, 2005	Kitt Peak	Spacewatch	·	690 m	MPC · JPL
260632	2005 GP_{104}	—	April 10, 2005	Kitt Peak	Spacewatch	·	1.0 km	MPC · JPL
260633	2005 GY_{104}	—	April 10, 2005	Kitt Peak	Spacewatch	·	1.6 km	MPC · JPL
260634	2005 GJ_{111}	—	April 10, 2005	Siding Spring	SSS	JUN	1.5 km	MPC · JPL
260635	2005 GW_{113}	—	April 9, 2005	Socorro	LINEAR	·	1.8 km	MPC · JPL
260636	2005 GV_{119}	—	April 11, 2005	Socorro	LINEAR	·	2.4 km	MPC · JPL
260637	2005 GA_{123}	—	April 6, 2005	Mount Lemmon	Mount Lemmon Survey	·	1.5 km	MPC · JPL
260638	2005 GB_{126}	—	April 11, 2005	Kitt Peak	Spacewatch	·	900 m	MPC · JPL
260639	2005 GN_{126}	—	April 11, 2005	Mount Lemmon	Mount Lemmon Survey	·	660 m	MPC · JPL
260640	2005 GC_{129}	—	April 7, 2005	Palomar	NEAT	·	1.7 km	MPC · JPL
260641	2005 GQ_{130}	—	April 8, 2005	Socorro	LINEAR	·	3.4 km	MPC · JPL
260642	2005 GE_{132}	—	April 10, 2005	Kitt Peak	Spacewatch	·	2.1 km	MPC · JPL
260643	2005 GR_{135}	—	April 10, 2005	Kitt Peak	Spacewatch	·	1.4 km	MPC · JPL
260644	2005 GY_{136}	—	April 10, 2005	Kitt Peak	Spacewatch	V	890 m	MPC · JPL
260645	2005 GA_{138}	—	April 11, 2005	Mount Lemmon	Mount Lemmon Survey	V	720 m	MPC · JPL
260646	2005 GD_{138}	—	April 11, 2005	Kitt Peak	Spacewatch	·	1.4 km	MPC · JPL
260647	2005 GK_{139}	—	April 12, 2005	Kitt Peak	Spacewatch	·	1.7 km	MPC · JPL
260648	2005 GY_{142}	—	April 10, 2005	Kitt Peak	Spacewatch	·	1.8 km	MPC · JPL
260649	2005 GT_{144}	—	April 10, 2005	Siding Spring	SSS	·	2.4 km	MPC · JPL
260650	2005 GG_{151}	—	April 11, 2005	Kitt Peak	Spacewatch	NYS	1.0 km	MPC · JPL
260651	2005 GM_{151}	—	April 11, 2005	Kitt Peak	Spacewatch	·	1.6 km	MPC · JPL
260652	2005 GY_{152}	—	April 13, 2005	Anderson Mesa	LONEOS	(2076)	940 m	MPC · JPL
260653	2005 GF_{161}	—	April 13, 2005	Catalina	CSS	·	2.0 km	MPC · JPL
260654	2005 GN_{161}	—	April 13, 2005	Catalina	CSS	·	1.7 km	MPC · JPL
260655	2005 GV_{166}	—	April 11, 2005	Mount Lemmon	Mount Lemmon Survey	·	960 m	MPC · JPL
260656	2005 GW_{180}	—	April 12, 2005	Kitt Peak	Spacewatch	NYS	1.4 km	MPC · JPL
260657	2005 GB_{182}	—	April 13, 2005	Kitt Peak	Spacewatch	·	1.4 km	MPC · JPL
260658	2005 GB_{215}	—	April 12, 2005	Kitt Peak	Spacewatch	MAS	940 m	MPC · JPL
260659	2005 GO_{217}	—	April 2, 2005	Kitt Peak	Spacewatch	·	870 m	MPC · JPL
260660	2005 GX_{223}	—	April 1, 2005	Anderson Mesa	LONEOS	·	2.2 km	MPC · JPL
260661	2005 HE_{2}	—	April 16, 2005	Kitt Peak	Spacewatch	JUN	1.0 km	MPC · JPL
260662	2005 HV_{4}	—	April 30, 2005	Kitt Peak	Spacewatch	·	1.9 km	MPC · JPL
260663	2005 HY_{5}	—	April 30, 2005	Kitt Peak	Spacewatch	·	1.5 km	MPC · JPL
260664	2005 HC_{9}	—	April 17, 2005	Kitt Peak	Spacewatch	·	1.5 km	MPC · JPL
260665	2005 JM	—	May 1, 2005	Kitt Peak	Spacewatch	EUN	1.6 km	MPC · JPL
260666	2005 JQ	—	May 3, 2005	Socorro	LINEAR	·	1.1 km	MPC · JPL
260667	2005 JE_{4}	—	May 3, 2005	Catalina	CSS	·	1.3 km	MPC · JPL
260668	2005 JH_{4}	—	May 3, 2005	Catalina	CSS	NYS	1.5 km	MPC · JPL
260669	2005 JX_{6}	—	May 4, 2005	Mauna Kea	Veillet, C.	V	730 m	MPC · JPL
260670	2005 JD_{9}	—	May 4, 2005	Mauna Kea	Veillet, C.	MAS	820 m	MPC · JPL
260671	2005 JT_{21}	—	May 6, 2005	Mount Lemmon	Mount Lemmon Survey	NYS	1.2 km	MPC · JPL
260672	2005 JV_{33}	—	May 4, 2005	Mount Lemmon	Mount Lemmon Survey	·	2.0 km	MPC · JPL
260673	2005 JG_{37}	—	May 4, 2005	Siding Spring	SSS	·	1.8 km	MPC · JPL
260674	2005 JJ_{42}	—	May 8, 2005	Kitt Peak	Spacewatch	·	960 m	MPC · JPL
260675	2005 JO_{44}	—	May 8, 2005	Mount Lemmon	Mount Lemmon Survey	·	1.7 km	MPC · JPL
260676 Évethurière	2005 JT_{44}	Évethurière	May 8, 2005	Saint-Sulpice	B. Christophe	·	1.3 km	MPC · JPL
260677	2005 JZ_{49}	—	May 4, 2005	Kitt Peak	Spacewatch	·	1.1 km	MPC · JPL
260678	2005 JU_{56}	—	May 6, 2005	Kitt Peak	Spacewatch	·	1.9 km	MPC · JPL
260679	2005 JZ_{56}	—	May 7, 2005	Kitt Peak	Spacewatch	·	1.2 km	MPC · JPL
260680	2005 JB_{59}	—	May 8, 2005	Mount Lemmon	Mount Lemmon Survey	·	1.0 km	MPC · JPL
260681	2005 JP_{59}	—	May 8, 2005	Kitt Peak	Spacewatch	·	1.3 km	MPC · JPL
260682	2005 JP_{62}	—	May 9, 2005	Mount Lemmon	Mount Lemmon Survey	·	1.5 km	MPC · JPL
260683	2005 JU_{65}	—	May 4, 2005	Palomar	NEAT	·	1.1 km	MPC · JPL
260684	2005 JE_{72}	—	May 8, 2005	Catalina	CSS	·	840 m	MPC · JPL
260685	2005 JF_{77}	—	May 10, 2005	Mount Lemmon	Mount Lemmon Survey	·	930 m	MPC · JPL
260686	2005 JW_{77}	—	May 10, 2005	Socorro	LINEAR	·	1.3 km	MPC · JPL
260687	2005 JA_{79}	—	May 10, 2005	Mount Lemmon	Mount Lemmon Survey	·	2.0 km	MPC · JPL
260688	2005 JE_{91}	—	May 11, 2005	Palomar	NEAT	MAR	1.1 km	MPC · JPL
260689	2005 JR_{93}	—	May 11, 2005	Palomar	NEAT	·	2.0 km	MPC · JPL
260690	2005 JZ_{97}	—	May 8, 2005	Kitt Peak	Spacewatch	·	1.0 km	MPC · JPL
260691	2005 JP_{98}	—	May 8, 2005	Kitt Peak	Spacewatch	·	1.5 km	MPC · JPL
260692	2005 JF_{99}	—	May 9, 2005	Anderson Mesa	LONEOS	MAS	820 m	MPC · JPL
260693	2005 JY_{101}	—	May 9, 2005	Kitt Peak	Spacewatch	·	1.9 km	MPC · JPL
260694	2005 JM_{105}	—	May 11, 2005	Mount Lemmon	Mount Lemmon Survey	·	1.7 km	MPC · JPL
260695	2005 JS_{106}	—	May 12, 2005	Kitt Peak	Spacewatch	V	870 m	MPC · JPL
260696	2005 JT_{111}	—	May 9, 2005	Anderson Mesa	LONEOS	·	1.9 km	MPC · JPL
260697	2005 JV_{111}	—	May 9, 2005	Anderson Mesa	LONEOS	·	1.3 km	MPC · JPL
260698	2005 JC_{118}	—	May 10, 2005	Kitt Peak	Spacewatch	V	910 m	MPC · JPL
260699	2005 JD_{119}	—	May 10, 2005	Kitt Peak	Spacewatch	NEM	2.8 km	MPC · JPL
260700	2005 JF_{120}	—	May 10, 2005	Kitt Peak	Spacewatch	·	1.5 km	MPC · JPL

== 260701–260800 ==
back to top

Designation			Discovery			Properties		Ref
Permanent	Provisional	Named after	Date	Site	Discoverer(s)	Category	Diam.	Ref
260701	2005 JV_{120}	—	May 10, 2005	Kitt Peak	Spacewatch	L4	10 km	MPC · JPL
260702	2005 JZ_{120}	—	May 10, 2005	Kitt Peak	Spacewatch	·	1.6 km	MPC · JPL
260703	2005 JP_{126}	—	May 12, 2005	Catalina	CSS	·	3.0 km	MPC · JPL
260704	2005 JD_{130}	—	May 13, 2005	Kitt Peak	Spacewatch	NYS	900 m	MPC · JPL
260705	2005 JA_{133}	—	May 14, 2005	Kitt Peak	Spacewatch	·	1.7 km	MPC · JPL
260706	2005 JQ_{133}	—	May 14, 2005	Kitt Peak	Spacewatch	V	880 m	MPC · JPL
260707	2005 JW_{136}	—	May 12, 2005	Kitt Peak	Spacewatch	·	860 m	MPC · JPL
260708	2005 JG_{143}	—	May 15, 2005	Mount Lemmon	Mount Lemmon Survey	·	2.0 km	MPC · JPL
260709	2005 JQ_{144}	—	May 15, 2005	Mount Lemmon	Mount Lemmon Survey	·	3.2 km	MPC · JPL
260710	2005 JB_{145}	—	May 15, 2005	Mount Lemmon	Mount Lemmon Survey	·	1.8 km	MPC · JPL
260711	2005 JU_{147}	—	May 13, 2005	Kitt Peak	Spacewatch	·	2.0 km	MPC · JPL
260712	2005 JB_{150}	—	May 3, 2005	Kitt Peak	Spacewatch	·	1.4 km	MPC · JPL
260713	2005 JX_{156}	—	May 4, 2005	Catalina	CSS	·	1.8 km	MPC · JPL
260714	2005 JO_{158}	—	May 6, 2005	Catalina	CSS	·	2.1 km	MPC · JPL
260715	2005 JC_{164}	—	May 9, 2005	Kitt Peak	Spacewatch	·	1.7 km	MPC · JPL
260716	2005 JD_{166}	—	May 11, 2005	Palomar	NEAT	·	2.6 km	MPC · JPL
260717	2005 JY_{166}	—	May 11, 2005	Palomar	NEAT	·	1.8 km	MPC · JPL
260718	2005 JX_{176}	—	May 13, 2005	Siding Spring	SSS	PHO	1.5 km	MPC · JPL
260719	2005 JC_{179}	—	May 14, 2005	Palomar	NEAT	·	1.3 km	MPC · JPL
260720	2005 JB_{185}	—	May 3, 2005	Kitt Peak	Spacewatch	·	1.5 km	MPC · JPL
260721	2005 KL_{1}	—	May 16, 2005	Mount Lemmon	Mount Lemmon Survey	·	1.9 km	MPC · JPL
260722	2005 KP_{4}	—	May 17, 2005	Mount Lemmon	Mount Lemmon Survey	·	1.3 km	MPC · JPL
260723	2005 KL_{5}	—	May 16, 2005	Kitt Peak	Spacewatch	·	1.4 km	MPC · JPL
260724 Malherbe	2005 KB_{10}	Malherbe	May 30, 2005	Saint-Sulpice	Saint-Sulpice	·	1.8 km	MPC · JPL
260725	2005 KL_{11}	—	May 29, 2005	Campo Imperatore	CINEOS	RAF	1.3 km	MPC · JPL
260726	2005 LQ_{2}	—	June 1, 2005	Kitt Peak	Spacewatch	L4	11 km	MPC · JPL
260727	2005 LT_{2}	—	June 2, 2005	Catalina	CSS	·	1.0 km	MPC · JPL
260728	2005 LQ_{4}	—	June 1, 2005	Kitt Peak	Spacewatch	·	1.7 km	MPC · JPL
260729	2005 LA_{5}	—	June 1, 2005	Kitt Peak	Spacewatch	·	1.8 km	MPC · JPL
260730	2005 LN_{11}	—	June 3, 2005	Kitt Peak	Spacewatch	·	1.1 km	MPC · JPL
260731	2005 LO_{12}	—	June 2, 2005	Anderson Mesa	LONEOS	·	2.8 km	MPC · JPL
260732	2005 LN_{19}	—	June 8, 2005	Kitt Peak	Spacewatch	·	2.1 km	MPC · JPL
260733	2005 LV_{19}	—	June 6, 2005	Socorro	LINEAR	·	2.4 km	MPC · JPL
260734	2005 LZ_{19}	—	June 8, 2005	Kitt Peak	Spacewatch	PHO	1.7 km	MPC · JPL
260735	2005 LE_{22}	—	June 10, 2005	Kitt Peak	Spacewatch	·	1.5 km	MPC · JPL
260736	2005 LV_{27}	—	June 9, 2005	Kitt Peak	Spacewatch	KON	2.6 km	MPC · JPL
260737	2005 LR_{30}	—	June 12, 2005	Kitt Peak	Spacewatch	·	1.7 km	MPC · JPL
260738	2005 LL_{40}	—	June 14, 2005	Kitt Peak	Spacewatch	BRG	2.1 km	MPC · JPL
260739	2005 LY_{40}	—	June 10, 2005	Kitt Peak	Spacewatch	·	1.1 km	MPC · JPL
260740	2005 LY_{44}	—	June 13, 2005	Mount Lemmon	Mount Lemmon Survey	·	1.7 km	MPC · JPL
260741	2005 LV_{45}	—	June 13, 2005	Kitt Peak	Spacewatch	WAT	1.8 km	MPC · JPL
260742	2005 LB_{46}	—	June 13, 2005	Kitt Peak	Spacewatch	·	2.2 km	MPC · JPL
260743	2005 LA_{49}	—	June 10, 2005	Kitt Peak	Spacewatch	·	2.9 km	MPC · JPL
260744	2005 LQ_{53}	—	June 8, 2005	Kitt Peak	Spacewatch	·	2.2 km	MPC · JPL
260745	2005 MN_{1}	—	June 16, 2005	Reedy Creek	J. Broughton	EUN	2.0 km	MPC · JPL
260746	2005 MU_{6}	—	June 26, 2005	Palomar	NEAT	EUN	1.8 km	MPC · JPL
260747	2005 ML_{10}	—	June 27, 2005	Kitt Peak	Spacewatch	MAR	1.1 km	MPC · JPL
260748	2005 MO_{12}	—	June 28, 2005	Palomar	NEAT	V	960 m	MPC · JPL
260749	2005 MZ_{12}	—	June 29, 2005	Catalina	CSS	·	2.6 km	MPC · JPL
260750	2005 MX_{16}	—	June 27, 2005	Kitt Peak	Spacewatch	·	1.4 km	MPC · JPL
260751	2005 MT_{19}	—	June 29, 2005	Kitt Peak	Spacewatch	·	2.4 km	MPC · JPL
260752	2005 MS_{21}	—	June 30, 2005	Kitt Peak	Spacewatch	(5)	1.2 km	MPC · JPL
260753	2005 MT_{22}	—	June 30, 2005	Kitt Peak	Spacewatch	·	1.7 km	MPC · JPL
260754	2005 MO_{25}	—	June 27, 2005	Kitt Peak	Spacewatch	MIS	2.7 km	MPC · JPL
260755	2005 MS_{28}	—	June 29, 2005	Kitt Peak	Spacewatch	·	1.5 km	MPC · JPL
260756	2005 MX_{29}	—	June 29, 2005	Kitt Peak	Spacewatch	EOS	1.9 km	MPC · JPL
260757	2005 MY_{33}	—	June 29, 2005	Kitt Peak	Spacewatch	·	1.8 km	MPC · JPL
260758	2005 MU_{34}	—	June 29, 2005	Palomar	NEAT	(5)	1.5 km	MPC · JPL
260759	2005 MK_{41}	—	June 30, 2005	Kitt Peak	Spacewatch	·	2.7 km	MPC · JPL
260760	2005 MJ_{43}	—	June 21, 2005	Palomar	NEAT	MAR	1.5 km	MPC · JPL
260761	2005 MB_{44}	—	June 27, 2005	Palomar	NEAT	·	2.3 km	MPC · JPL
260762	2005 MK_{44}	—	June 27, 2005	Mount Lemmon	Mount Lemmon Survey	·	2.2 km	MPC · JPL
260763	2005 MS_{44}	—	June 27, 2005	Mount Lemmon	Mount Lemmon Survey	·	2.1 km	MPC · JPL
260764	2005 MO_{46}	—	June 28, 2005	Kitt Peak	Spacewatch	·	1.3 km	MPC · JPL
260765	2005 MF_{47}	—	June 28, 2005	Palomar	NEAT	·	2.1 km	MPC · JPL
260766	2005 MZ_{48}	—	June 29, 2005	Catalina	CSS	·	2.3 km	MPC · JPL
260767	2005 MC_{49}	—	June 29, 2005	Palomar	NEAT	·	1.9 km	MPC · JPL
260768	2005 ME_{49}	—	June 29, 2005	Palomar	NEAT	·	1.4 km	MPC · JPL
260769	2005 MP_{50}	—	June 30, 2005	Kitt Peak	Spacewatch	·	3.6 km	MPC · JPL
260770	2005 NL	—	July 2, 2005	Kitt Peak	Spacewatch	·	1.5 km	MPC · JPL
260771	2005 NJ_{3}	—	July 1, 2005	Kitt Peak	Spacewatch	·	1.8 km	MPC · JPL
260772	2005 NO_{3}	—	July 1, 2005	Kitt Peak	Spacewatch	·	1.9 km	MPC · JPL
260773	2005 NK_{5}	—	July 3, 2005	Mount Lemmon	Mount Lemmon Survey	·	2.1 km	MPC · JPL
260774	2005 NF_{8}	—	July 1, 2005	Kitt Peak	Spacewatch	·	1.2 km	MPC · JPL
260775	2005 NZ_{8}	—	July 1, 2005	Kitt Peak	Spacewatch	·	1.2 km	MPC · JPL
260776	2005 NB_{9}	—	July 1, 2005	Kitt Peak	Spacewatch	·	1.4 km	MPC · JPL
260777	2005 NQ_{10}	—	July 3, 2005	Mount Lemmon	Mount Lemmon Survey	·	2.1 km	MPC · JPL
260778	2005 NN_{13}	—	July 5, 2005	Kitt Peak	Spacewatch	EOS	2.4 km	MPC · JPL
260779	2005 NJ_{16}	—	July 2, 2005	Kitt Peak	Spacewatch	·	1.8 km	MPC · JPL
260780	2005 NY_{32}	—	July 5, 2005	Kitt Peak	Spacewatch	·	1.6 km	MPC · JPL
260781	2005 NH_{34}	—	July 5, 2005	Kitt Peak	Spacewatch	·	1.7 km	MPC · JPL
260782	2005 NN_{34}	—	July 5, 2005	Kitt Peak	Spacewatch	·	2.4 km	MPC · JPL
260783	2005 NP_{39}	—	July 7, 2005	Reedy Creek	J. Broughton	·	3.3 km	MPC · JPL
260784	2005 NV_{39}	—	July 5, 2005	Palomar	NEAT	·	2.9 km	MPC · JPL
260785	2005 NH_{40}	—	July 3, 2005	Mount Lemmon	Mount Lemmon Survey	·	2.1 km	MPC · JPL
260786	2005 NP_{40}	—	July 3, 2005	Mount Lemmon	Mount Lemmon Survey	·	2.6 km	MPC · JPL
260787	2005 NR_{40}	—	July 3, 2005	Mount Lemmon	Mount Lemmon Survey	·	1.2 km	MPC · JPL
260788	2005 NS_{40}	—	July 3, 2005	Mount Lemmon	Mount Lemmon Survey	HOF	3.0 km	MPC · JPL
260789	2005 NX_{42}	—	July 5, 2005	Mount Lemmon	Mount Lemmon Survey	·	1.4 km	MPC · JPL
260790	2005 NQ_{43}	—	July 6, 2005	Kitt Peak	Spacewatch	·	2.6 km	MPC · JPL
260791	2005 NZ_{46}	—	July 6, 2005	Campo Imperatore	CINEOS	·	1.6 km	MPC · JPL
260792	2005 NP_{54}	—	July 10, 2005	Kitt Peak	Spacewatch	·	2.0 km	MPC · JPL
260793	2005 NF_{56}	—	July 11, 2005	Mount Lemmon	Mount Lemmon Survey	·	2.4 km	MPC · JPL
260794	2005 NE_{75}	—	July 10, 2005	Kitt Peak	Spacewatch	·	2.3 km	MPC · JPL
260795	2005 NW_{76}	—	July 10, 2005	Kitt Peak	Spacewatch	·	2.5 km	MPC · JPL
260796	2005 NP_{79}	—	July 9, 2005	Reedy Creek	J. Broughton	(5)	1.6 km	MPC · JPL
260797	2005 NT_{84}	—	July 2, 2005	Kitt Peak	Spacewatch	·	1.6 km	MPC · JPL
260798	2005 NN_{86}	—	July 3, 2005	Mount Lemmon	Mount Lemmon Survey	·	900 m	MPC · JPL
260799	2005 NT_{87}	—	July 4, 2005	Kitt Peak	Spacewatch	·	1.6 km	MPC · JPL
260800	2005 NK_{95}	—	July 7, 2005	Kitt Peak	Spacewatch	·	2.5 km	MPC · JPL

== 260801–260900 ==
back to top

Designation			Discovery			Properties		Ref
Permanent	Provisional	Named after	Date	Site	Discoverer(s)	Category	Diam.	Ref
260801	2005 NW_{100}	—	July 2, 2005	Catalina	CSS	ADE	3.1 km	MPC · JPL
260802	2005 NG_{115}	—	July 7, 2005	Mauna Kea	Veillet, C.	·	1.4 km	MPC · JPL
260803	2005 NY_{118}	—	July 7, 2005	Mauna Kea	Veillet, C.	HOF	3.1 km	MPC · JPL
260804	2005 NU_{122}	—	July 4, 2005	Palomar	NEAT	·	2.8 km	MPC · JPL
260805	2005 ND_{123}	—	July 6, 2005	Kitt Peak	Spacewatch	·	1.7 km	MPC · JPL
260806	2005 NH_{124}	—	July 5, 2005	Kitt Peak	Spacewatch	·	1.9 km	MPC · JPL
260807	2005 OM_{1}	—	July 26, 2005	Palomar	NEAT	·	3.3 km	MPC · JPL
260808	2005 OR_{1}	—	July 26, 2005	Palomar	NEAT	MAR	1.7 km	MPC · JPL
260809	2005 OT_{1}	—	July 27, 2005	Siding Spring	SSS	·	3.5 km	MPC · JPL
260810	2005 OR_{3}	—	July 28, 2005	Reedy Creek	J. Broughton	·	1.8 km	MPC · JPL
260811	2005 OW_{5}	—	July 28, 2005	Palomar	NEAT	·	2.7 km	MPC · JPL
260812	2005 OZ_{6}	—	July 28, 2005	Palomar	NEAT	·	4.3 km	MPC · JPL
260813	2005 OP_{9}	—	July 27, 2005	Palomar	NEAT	·	1.7 km	MPC · JPL
260814	2005 OS_{10}	—	July 27, 2005	Palomar	NEAT	KRM	3.4 km	MPC · JPL
260815	2005 OZ_{10}	—	July 27, 2005	Siding Spring	SSS	·	1.7 km	MPC · JPL
260816	2005 ON_{14}	—	July 31, 2005	Siding Spring	SSS	·	3.4 km	MPC · JPL
260817	2005 OR_{23}	—	July 30, 2005	Palomar	NEAT	KON	2.0 km	MPC · JPL
260818	2005 OT_{24}	—	July 31, 2005	Palomar	NEAT	·	2.4 km	MPC · JPL
260819	2005 OR_{31}	—	July 30, 2005	Palomar	NEAT	·	1.6 km	MPC · JPL
260820	2005 PF_{13}	—	August 4, 2005	Palomar	NEAT	·	2.0 km	MPC · JPL
260821	2005 PG_{14}	—	August 4, 2005	Palomar	NEAT	·	2.2 km	MPC · JPL
260822	2005 PU_{15}	—	August 4, 2005	Palomar	NEAT	·	2.5 km	MPC · JPL
260823	2005 PT_{17}	—	August 10, 2005	Siding Spring	SSS	·	2.5 km	MPC · JPL
260824 Hermanus	2005 PC_{24}	Hermanus	August 9, 2005	Cerro Tololo	Trilling, D. E.	·	2.4 km	MPC · JPL
260825	2005 PD_{24}	—	August 9, 2005	Cerro Tololo	M. W. Buie	·	1.8 km	MPC · JPL
260826	2005 QB	—	August 17, 2005	Ottmarsheim	Ottmarsheim	·	2.7 km	MPC · JPL
260827	2005 QW_{6}	—	August 24, 2005	Palomar	NEAT	THM	2.6 km	MPC · JPL
260828	2005 QJ_{14}	—	August 25, 2005	Palomar	NEAT	·	1.8 km	MPC · JPL
260829	2005 QQ_{14}	—	August 25, 2005	Palomar	NEAT	·	2.1 km	MPC · JPL
260830	2005 QT_{14}	—	August 25, 2005	Palomar	NEAT	HOF	3.2 km	MPC · JPL
260831	2005 QU_{21}	—	August 26, 2005	Campo Imperatore	CINEOS	MRX	1.4 km	MPC · JPL
260832	2005 QO_{23}	—	August 27, 2005	Kitt Peak	Spacewatch	HOF	2.5 km	MPC · JPL
260833	2005 QT_{25}	—	August 27, 2005	Kitt Peak	Spacewatch	KOR	2.0 km	MPC · JPL
260834	2005 QB_{27}	—	August 27, 2005	Kitt Peak	Spacewatch	·	2.0 km	MPC · JPL
260835	2005 QD_{29}	—	August 29, 2005	Wrightwood	J. W. Young	·	2.0 km	MPC · JPL
260836	2005 QY_{34}	—	August 25, 2005	Palomar	NEAT	·	1.9 km	MPC · JPL
260837	2005 QC_{39}	—	August 26, 2005	Anderson Mesa	LONEOS	·	2.4 km	MPC · JPL
260838	2005 QW_{41}	—	August 26, 2005	Anderson Mesa	LONEOS	·	2.3 km	MPC · JPL
260839	2005 QZ_{43}	—	August 26, 2005	Palomar	NEAT	GEF	1.6 km	MPC · JPL
260840	2005 QO_{45}	—	August 26, 2005	Palomar	NEAT	·	3.3 km	MPC · JPL
260841	2005 QQ_{54}	—	August 28, 2005	Kitt Peak	Spacewatch	·	4.0 km	MPC · JPL
260842	2005 QF_{61}	—	August 26, 2005	Palomar	NEAT	·	4.8 km	MPC · JPL
260843	2005 QO_{61}	—	August 26, 2005	Palomar	NEAT	EOS	3.2 km	MPC · JPL
260844	2005 QS_{61}	—	August 26, 2005	Palomar	NEAT	EOS	2.4 km	MPC · JPL
260845	2005 QB_{62}	—	August 26, 2005	Palomar	NEAT	·	2.8 km	MPC · JPL
260846	2005 QR_{64}	—	August 26, 2005	Palomar	NEAT	·	1.9 km	MPC · JPL
260847	2005 QY_{64}	—	August 26, 2005	Palomar	NEAT	·	1.5 km	MPC · JPL
260848	2005 QK_{65}	—	August 26, 2005	Palomar	NEAT	·	2.0 km	MPC · JPL
260849	2005 QT_{71}	—	August 29, 2005	Anderson Mesa	LONEOS	MRX	1.5 km	MPC · JPL
260850	2005 QB_{78}	—	August 25, 2005	Palomar	NEAT	KOR	1.5 km	MPC · JPL
260851	2005 QC_{78}	—	August 25, 2005	Palomar	NEAT	·	4.4 km	MPC · JPL
260852	2005 QH_{79}	—	August 26, 2005	Palomar	NEAT	V	1.1 km	MPC · JPL
260853	2005 QT_{79}	—	August 27, 2005	Anderson Mesa	LONEOS	·	3.1 km	MPC · JPL
260854	2005 QP_{82}	—	August 29, 2005	Goodricke-Pigott	R. A. Tucker	·	3.3 km	MPC · JPL
260855	2005 QH_{84}	—	August 30, 2005	Campo Imperatore	CINEOS	·	2.6 km	MPC · JPL
260856	2005 QJ_{85}	—	August 30, 2005	Socorro	LINEAR	·	2.7 km	MPC · JPL
260857	2005 QN_{85}	—	August 30, 2005	Kitt Peak	Spacewatch	·	2.2 km	MPC · JPL
260858	2005 QT_{85}	—	August 30, 2005	Anderson Mesa	LONEOS	·	3.0 km	MPC · JPL
260859	2005 QL_{86}	—	August 30, 2005	Kitt Peak	Spacewatch	·	1.9 km	MPC · JPL
260860	2005 QU_{89}	—	August 24, 2005	Palomar	NEAT	·	1.5 km	MPC · JPL
260861	2005 QX_{89}	—	August 24, 2005	Palomar	NEAT	·	2.2 km	MPC · JPL
260862	2005 QW_{90}	—	August 25, 2005	Palomar	NEAT	·	5.1 km	MPC · JPL
260863	2005 QC_{92}	—	August 26, 2005	Anderson Mesa	LONEOS	AGN	1.6 km	MPC · JPL
260864	2005 QD_{93}	—	August 26, 2005	Palomar	NEAT	·	1.6 km	MPC · JPL
260865	2005 QL_{96}	—	August 27, 2005	Palomar	NEAT	·	1.4 km	MPC · JPL
260866	2005 QO_{97}	—	August 27, 2005	Palomar	NEAT	·	2.9 km	MPC · JPL
260867	2005 QR_{99}	—	August 27, 2005	Palomar	NEAT	·	1.6 km	MPC · JPL
260868	2005 QF_{101}	—	August 27, 2005	Palomar	NEAT	·	1.9 km	MPC · JPL
260869	2005 QL_{102}	—	August 27, 2005	Palomar	NEAT	·	1.8 km	MPC · JPL
260870	2005 QR_{102}	—	August 27, 2005	Palomar	NEAT	PAD	1.8 km	MPC · JPL
260871	2005 QX_{102}	—	August 27, 2005	Palomar	NEAT	(5)	1.4 km	MPC · JPL
260872	2005 QR_{110}	—	August 27, 2005	Palomar	NEAT	·	3.3 km	MPC · JPL
260873	2005 QV_{112}	—	August 27, 2005	Palomar	NEAT	·	1.4 km	MPC · JPL
260874	2005 QC_{121}	—	August 28, 2005	Kitt Peak	Spacewatch	·	2.2 km	MPC · JPL
260875	2005 QO_{126}	—	August 28, 2005	Kitt Peak	Spacewatch	KOR	1.5 km	MPC · JPL
260876	2005 QN_{127}	—	August 28, 2005	Kitt Peak	Spacewatch	KOR	1.4 km	MPC · JPL
260877	2005 QR_{128}	—	August 28, 2005	Kitt Peak	Spacewatch	KOR	1.3 km	MPC · JPL
260878	2005 QX_{130}	—	August 28, 2005	Kitt Peak	Spacewatch	·	3.4 km	MPC · JPL
260879	2005 QC_{131}	—	August 28, 2005	Kitt Peak	Spacewatch	·	2.2 km	MPC · JPL
260880	2005 QU_{131}	—	August 28, 2005	Kitt Peak	Spacewatch	·	2.7 km	MPC · JPL
260881	2005 QP_{133}	—	August 28, 2005	Kitt Peak	Spacewatch	KOR	1.3 km	MPC · JPL
260882	2005 QR_{134}	—	August 28, 2005	Kitt Peak	Spacewatch	·	2.0 km	MPC · JPL
260883	2005 QT_{134}	—	August 28, 2005	Kitt Peak	Spacewatch	·	2.1 km	MPC · JPL
260884	2005 QL_{138}	—	August 28, 2005	Kitt Peak	Spacewatch	·	1.8 km	MPC · JPL
260885	2005 QG_{142}	—	August 30, 2005	Socorro	LINEAR	·	3.4 km	MPC · JPL
260886 Henritudor	2005 QP_{143}	Henritudor	August 31, 2005	Cote de Meuse	Dawson, M.	·	4.1 km	MPC · JPL
260887	2005 QS_{143}	—	August 31, 2005	Kitt Peak	Spacewatch	·	2.1 km	MPC · JPL
260888	2005 QP_{145}	—	August 27, 2005	Palomar	NEAT	EUN	2.0 km	MPC · JPL
260889	2005 QC_{147}	—	August 28, 2005	Siding Spring	SSS	·	2.0 km	MPC · JPL
260890	2005 QG_{150}	—	August 27, 2005	Palomar	NEAT	·	3.0 km	MPC · JPL
260891	2005 QM_{152}	—	August 26, 2005	Anderson Mesa	LONEOS	·	3.2 km	MPC · JPL
260892	2005 QL_{154}	—	August 27, 2005	Palomar	NEAT	·	2.2 km	MPC · JPL
260893	2005 QR_{154}	—	August 28, 2005	Anderson Mesa	LONEOS	EUN	1.8 km	MPC · JPL
260894	2005 QW_{158}	—	August 27, 2005	Palomar	NEAT	·	2.5 km	MPC · JPL
260895	2005 QF_{171}	—	August 29, 2005	Palomar	NEAT	·	4.5 km	MPC · JPL
260896	2005 QE_{178}	—	August 25, 2005	Palomar	NEAT	(18466)	2.8 km	MPC · JPL
260897	2005 QK_{181}	—	August 30, 2005	Kitt Peak	Spacewatch	·	3.9 km	MPC · JPL
260898	2005 QA_{182}	—	August 31, 2005	Kitt Peak	Spacewatch	·	1.9 km	MPC · JPL
260899	2005 QB_{182}	—	August 31, 2005	Kitt Peak	Spacewatch	·	2.9 km	MPC · JPL
260900	2005 QC_{182}	—	August 31, 2005	Palomar	NEAT	·	2.2 km	MPC · JPL

== 260901–261000 ==
back to top

Designation			Discovery			Properties		Ref
Permanent	Provisional	Named after	Date	Site	Discoverer(s)	Category	Diam.	Ref
260901	2005 QO_{187}	—	August 31, 2005	Palomar	NEAT	·	2.6 km	MPC · JPL
260902	2005 QH_{189}	—	August 31, 2005	Kitt Peak	Spacewatch	·	1.9 km	MPC · JPL
260903	2005 QX_{189}	—	August 30, 2005	Kitt Peak	Spacewatch	·	1.7 km	MPC · JPL
260904	2005 QB_{190}	—	August 30, 2005	Kitt Peak	Spacewatch	HOF	2.6 km	MPC · JPL
260905	2005 RJ_{2}	—	September 2, 2005	Palomar	NEAT	·	3.3 km	MPC · JPL
260906 Robichon	2005 RR_{2}	Robichon	September 1, 2005	Vicques	M. Ory	DOR	5.2 km	MPC · JPL
260907	2005 RJ_{5}	—	September 1, 2005	Palomar	NEAT	·	2.4 km	MPC · JPL
260908	2005 RX_{6}	—	September 6, 2005	Anderson Mesa	LONEOS	·	2.7 km	MPC · JPL
260909	2005 RG_{9}	—	September 1, 2005	Palomar	NEAT	·	2.9 km	MPC · JPL
260910	2005 RY_{10}	—	September 10, 2005	Kingsnake	J. V. McClusky	·	2.7 km	MPC · JPL
260911	2005 RC_{14}	—	September 1, 2005	Kitt Peak	Spacewatch	·	1.6 km	MPC · JPL
260912	2005 RV_{14}	—	September 1, 2005	Kitt Peak	Spacewatch	·	2.4 km	MPC · JPL
260913	2005 RV_{15}	—	September 1, 2005	Kitt Peak	Spacewatch	·	1.7 km	MPC · JPL
260914	2005 RO_{16}	—	September 1, 2005	Anderson Mesa	LONEOS	·	3.6 km	MPC · JPL
260915	2005 RD_{19}	—	September 1, 2005	Kitt Peak	Spacewatch	·	1.9 km	MPC · JPL
260916	2005 RG_{19}	—	September 1, 2005	Kitt Peak	Spacewatch	VER	3.3 km	MPC · JPL
260917	2005 RH_{20}	—	September 1, 2005	Palomar	NEAT	·	4.9 km	MPC · JPL
260918	2005 RQ_{22}	—	September 10, 2005	Anderson Mesa	LONEOS	·	2.5 km	MPC · JPL
260919	2005 RH_{25}	—	September 10, 2005	Anderson Mesa	LONEOS	·	2.9 km	MPC · JPL
260920	2005 RO_{25}	—	September 10, 2005	Anderson Mesa	LONEOS	·	2.3 km	MPC · JPL
260921	2005 RP_{29}	—	September 12, 2005	Anderson Mesa	LONEOS	·	4.2 km	MPC · JPL
260922	2005 RY_{29}	—	September 8, 2005	Socorro	LINEAR	·	2.4 km	MPC · JPL
260923	2005 RK_{31}	—	September 12, 2005	Anderson Mesa	LONEOS	·	3.3 km	MPC · JPL
260924	2005 RO_{31}	—	September 13, 2005	Anderson Mesa	LONEOS	EUN	2.1 km	MPC · JPL
260925	2005 RY_{31}	—	September 13, 2005	Kitt Peak	Spacewatch	·	2.6 km	MPC · JPL
260926	2005 RB_{32}	—	September 13, 2005	Socorro	LINEAR	·	4.7 km	MPC · JPL
260927	2005 RR_{41}	—	September 13, 2005	Kitt Peak	Spacewatch	(12739)	2.1 km	MPC · JPL
260928	2005 RC_{44}	—	September 2, 2005	Palomar	NEAT	·	2.9 km	MPC · JPL
260929	2005 RS_{44}	—	September 1, 2005	Palomar	NEAT	·	2.5 km	MPC · JPL
260930	2005 RB_{45}	—	September 3, 2005	Palomar	NEAT	·	2.9 km	MPC · JPL
260931	2005 RA_{46}	—	September 14, 2005	Apache Point	A. C. Becker	·	3.7 km	MPC · JPL
260932	2005 RP_{51}	—	September 12, 2005	Kitt Peak	Spacewatch	EOS	2.8 km	MPC · JPL
260933	2005 RX_{51}	—	September 3, 2005	Catalina	CSS	·	2.3 km	MPC · JPL
260934	2005 RA_{52}	—	September 14, 2005	Catalina	CSS	·	2.2 km	MPC · JPL
260935	2005 SJ_{4}	—	September 24, 2005	Kitt Peak	Spacewatch	·	3.3 km	MPC · JPL
260936	2005 SS_{7}	—	September 24, 2005	Kitt Peak	Spacewatch	·	1.4 km	MPC · JPL
260937	2005 SD_{8}	—	September 25, 2005	Catalina	CSS	·	3.2 km	MPC · JPL
260938	2005 SF_{8}	—	September 25, 2005	Catalina	CSS	·	2.6 km	MPC · JPL
260939	2005 SL_{9}	—	September 24, 2005	Goodricke-Pigott	R. A. Tucker	·	2.8 km	MPC · JPL
260940	2005 SA_{10}	—	September 25, 2005	Kitt Peak	Spacewatch	·	1.8 km	MPC · JPL
260941	2005 ST_{11}	—	September 23, 2005	Kitt Peak	Spacewatch	·	2.6 km	MPC · JPL
260942	2005 SP_{12}	—	September 23, 2005	Catalina	CSS	·	2.7 km	MPC · JPL
260943	2005 SZ_{12}	—	September 24, 2005	Kitt Peak	Spacewatch	·	1.8 km	MPC · JPL
260944	2005 SL_{15}	—	September 26, 2005	Kitt Peak	Spacewatch	·	2.8 km	MPC · JPL
260945	2005 SO_{15}	—	September 26, 2005	Kitt Peak	Spacewatch	HOF	3.1 km	MPC · JPL
260946	2005 SZ_{17}	—	September 26, 2005	Kitt Peak	Spacewatch	VER	3.4 km	MPC · JPL
260947	2005 SP_{18}	—	September 26, 2005	Kitt Peak	Spacewatch	·	2.3 km	MPC · JPL
260948	2005 SR_{18}	—	September 26, 2005	Kitt Peak	Spacewatch	·	1.7 km	MPC · JPL
260949	2005 SW_{18}	—	September 26, 2005	Kitt Peak	Spacewatch	·	2.1 km	MPC · JPL
260950	2005 SY_{19}	—	September 25, 2005	Kingsnake	J. V. McClusky	·	3.4 km	MPC · JPL
260951	2005 SC_{22}	—	September 23, 2005	Kitt Peak	Spacewatch	·	2.6 km	MPC · JPL
260952	2005 SQ_{28}	—	September 23, 2005	Kitt Peak	Spacewatch	·	3.9 km	MPC · JPL
260953	2005 SB_{29}	—	September 23, 2005	Kitt Peak	Spacewatch	·	2.4 km	MPC · JPL
260954	2005 SH_{32}	—	September 23, 2005	Kitt Peak	Spacewatch	·	1.7 km	MPC · JPL
260955	2005 SL_{33}	—	September 23, 2005	Kitt Peak	Spacewatch	·	3.6 km	MPC · JPL
260956	2005 SM_{34}	—	September 23, 2005	Kitt Peak	Spacewatch	EOS	2.1 km	MPC · JPL
260957	2005 SH_{38}	—	September 24, 2005	Kitt Peak	Spacewatch	·	2.8 km	MPC · JPL
260958	2005 SF_{39}	—	September 24, 2005	Kitt Peak	Spacewatch	·	1.9 km	MPC · JPL
260959	2005 SD_{40}	—	September 24, 2005	Kitt Peak	Spacewatch	·	2.2 km	MPC · JPL
260960	2005 SG_{40}	—	September 24, 2005	Kitt Peak	Spacewatch	(5)	1.8 km	MPC · JPL
260961	2005 SM_{41}	—	September 24, 2005	Kitt Peak	Spacewatch	·	4.2 km	MPC · JPL
260962	2005 SQ_{42}	—	September 24, 2005	Kitt Peak	Spacewatch	·	3.6 km	MPC · JPL
260963	2005 SR_{42}	—	September 24, 2005	Kitt Peak	Spacewatch	·	2.8 km	MPC · JPL
260964	2005 SE_{43}	—	September 24, 2005	Kitt Peak	Spacewatch	·	3.3 km	MPC · JPL
260965	2005 SW_{45}	—	September 24, 2005	Kitt Peak	Spacewatch	·	2.5 km	MPC · JPL
260966	2005 SB_{47}	—	September 24, 2005	Kitt Peak	Spacewatch	·	4.6 km	MPC · JPL
260967	2005 SY_{47}	—	September 24, 2005	Kitt Peak	Spacewatch	·	2.2 km	MPC · JPL
260968	2005 SB_{51}	—	September 24, 2005	Kitt Peak	Spacewatch	·	1.4 km	MPC · JPL
260969	2005 SX_{52}	—	September 25, 2005	Kitt Peak	Spacewatch	AGN	1.3 km	MPC · JPL
260970	2005 SL_{55}	—	September 25, 2005	Kitt Peak	Spacewatch	fast	3.0 km	MPC · JPL
260971	2005 SQ_{55}	—	September 25, 2005	Kitt Peak	Spacewatch	·	2.4 km	MPC · JPL
260972	2005 SC_{56}	—	September 25, 2005	Kitt Peak	Spacewatch	·	2.4 km	MPC · JPL
260973	2005 SS_{57}	—	September 26, 2005	Kitt Peak	Spacewatch	AGN	1.5 km	MPC · JPL
260974	2005 SV_{57}	—	September 26, 2005	Kitt Peak	Spacewatch	EOS	1.6 km	MPC · JPL
260975	2005 SV_{58}	—	September 26, 2005	Kitt Peak	Spacewatch	EOS	2.4 km	MPC · JPL
260976	2005 SR_{59}	—	September 26, 2005	Kitt Peak	Spacewatch	·	2.6 km	MPC · JPL
260977	2005 ST_{60}	—	September 26, 2005	Kitt Peak	Spacewatch	·	2.4 km	MPC · JPL
260978	2005 SQ_{61}	—	September 26, 2005	Kitt Peak	Spacewatch	·	2.9 km	MPC · JPL
260979	2005 SZ_{61}	—	September 26, 2005	Kitt Peak	Spacewatch	AGN	1.3 km	MPC · JPL
260980	2005 SC_{62}	—	September 26, 2005	Kitt Peak	Spacewatch	AST	1.8 km	MPC · JPL
260981	2005 SK_{63}	—	September 26, 2005	Kitt Peak	Spacewatch	·	2.7 km	MPC · JPL
260982	2005 SS_{63}	—	September 26, 2005	Kitt Peak	Spacewatch	·	3.4 km	MPC · JPL
260983	2005 SK_{64}	—	September 26, 2005	Kitt Peak	Spacewatch	MRX	1.4 km	MPC · JPL
260984	2005 SJ_{69}	—	September 27, 2005	Kitt Peak	Spacewatch	·	3.2 km	MPC · JPL
260985	2005 SZ_{73}	—	September 23, 2005	Siding Spring	SSS	·	3.2 km	MPC · JPL
260986	2005 SH_{75}	—	September 24, 2005	Kitt Peak	Spacewatch	KOR	1.3 km	MPC · JPL
260987	2005 SG_{76}	—	September 24, 2005	Kitt Peak	Spacewatch	·	1.5 km	MPC · JPL
260988	2005 SZ_{77}	—	September 24, 2005	Kitt Peak	Spacewatch	KOR	1.3 km	MPC · JPL
260989	2005 SH_{79}	—	September 24, 2005	Kitt Peak	Spacewatch	MAS	1.2 km	MPC · JPL
260990	2005 SX_{79}	—	September 24, 2005	Kitt Peak	Spacewatch	·	2.3 km	MPC · JPL
260991	2005 SP_{81}	—	September 24, 2005	Kitt Peak	Spacewatch	·	1.2 km	MPC · JPL
260992	2005 SY_{83}	—	September 24, 2005	Kitt Peak	Spacewatch	·	1.7 km	MPC · JPL
260993	2005 SA_{84}	—	September 24, 2005	Kitt Peak	Spacewatch	·	2.6 km	MPC · JPL
260994	2005 SB_{84}	—	September 24, 2005	Kitt Peak	Spacewatch	AGN	1.8 km	MPC · JPL
260995	2005 SO_{87}	—	September 24, 2005	Kitt Peak	Spacewatch	·	2.0 km	MPC · JPL
260996	2005 SZ_{87}	—	September 24, 2005	Kitt Peak	Spacewatch	·	3.2 km	MPC · JPL
260997	2005 SG_{89}	—	September 24, 2005	Kitt Peak	Spacewatch	·	4.4 km	MPC · JPL
260998	2005 SU_{91}	—	September 24, 2005	Kitt Peak	Spacewatch	·	3.3 km	MPC · JPL
260999	2005 SV_{92}	—	September 24, 2005	Kitt Peak	Spacewatch	HOF	3.1 km	MPC · JPL
261000	2005 SY_{94}	—	September 25, 2005	Palomar	NEAT	·	3.0 km	MPC · JPL

back to top

== See also ==
- Meanings of minor-planet names: 260001–261000
