= List of minor planets: 822001–823000 =

The following is a partial list of minor planets, running from minor-planet number 822001 through 823000, inclusive. The primary data for this and other partial lists is based on JPL's "Small-Body Orbital Elements" and data available from the Minor Planet Center. Critical list information is also provided by the MPC, unless otherwise specified from Lowell Observatory. A detailed description of the table's columns and additional sources are given on the main page including a complete list of every page in this series, and a statistical break-up on the dynamical classification of minor planets.

Also see the summary list of all named bodies in numerical and alphabetical order, and the corresponding naming citations for the number range of this particular list. New namings may only be added to this list after official publication, as the preannouncement of names is condemned by the Working Group for Small Bodies Nomenclature of the International Astronomical Union.

Near-Earth obj.	MBA (inner)	MBA (outer)	Centaur
Mars-crosser	MBA (middle)	Jupiter trojan	Trans-Neptunian obj.
Unclassified

== 822001–822100 ==
Designation			Discovery			Properties		Ref
Permanent	Provisional	Named after	Date	Site	Discoverer(s)	Category	Diam.	Ref
822001	2015 NN_{17}	—	January 17, 2009	Mount Lemmon	Mount Lemmon Survey	H	320 m	MPC · JPL
822002	2015 NG_{18}	—	December 5, 2012	Oukaïmeden	C. Rinner	·	570 m	MPC · JPL
822003	2015 NU_{20}	—	September 11, 2004	Kitt Peak	Spacewatch	·	820 m	MPC · JPL
822004	2015 NP_{21}	—	June 7, 2015	Mount Lemmon	Mount Lemmon Survey	·	1.5 km	MPC · JPL
822005	2015 NG_{24}	—	January 3, 2014	Mount Lemmon	Mount Lemmon Survey	·	1.3 km	MPC · JPL
822006	2015 NJ_{29}	—	July 14, 2015	Haleakala	Pan-STARRS 1	H	470 m	MPC · JPL
822007	2015 NM_{30}	—	July 9, 2015	Haleakala	Pan-STARRS 1	·	800 m	MPC · JPL
822008	2015 NC_{32}	—	July 12, 2015	Haleakala	Pan-STARRS 1	·	900 m	MPC · JPL
822009	2015 NO_{33}	—	July 12, 2015	Haleakala	Pan-STARRS 1	·	1.5 km	MPC · JPL
822010	2015 NT_{37}	—	July 12, 2015	Haleakala	Pan-STARRS 1	EOS	1.3 km	MPC · JPL
822011	2015 NX_{37}	—	July 7, 2015	Haleakala	Pan-STARRS 1	·	1.7 km	MPC · JPL
822012	2015 NC_{38}	—	July 12, 2015	Haleakala	Pan-STARRS 1	·	1.9 km	MPC · JPL
822013	2015 NH_{40}	—	July 14, 2015	Haleakala	Pan-STARRS 1	·	520 m	MPC · JPL
822014	2015 NP_{40}	—	July 12, 2015	Haleakala	Pan-STARRS 1	·	530 m	MPC · JPL
822015	2015 NW_{40}	—	July 12, 2015	Haleakala	Pan-STARRS 1	·	600 m	MPC · JPL
822016	2015 OQ	—	June 17, 2009	Kitt Peak	Spacewatch	·	4.1 km	MPC · JPL
822017	2015 OU_{3}	—	May 22, 2015	Mauna Kea	D. J. Tholen	HNS	930 m	MPC · JPL
822018	2015 OG_{4}	—	October 29, 2008	Mount Lemmon	Mount Lemmon Survey	·	1.0 km	MPC · JPL
822019	2015 OK_{8}	—	July 12, 2015	Haleakala	Pan-STARRS 1	TIN	710 m	MPC · JPL
822020	2015 OK_{11}	—	October 5, 2012	Haleakala	Pan-STARRS 1	·	540 m	MPC · JPL
822021	2015 OY_{12}	—	February 26, 2011	Mount Lemmon	Mount Lemmon Survey	·	530 m	MPC · JPL
822022	2015 OK_{13}	—	December 8, 2005	Kitt Peak	Spacewatch	·	740 m	MPC · JPL
822023	2015 OU_{16}	—	October 10, 2010	Kitt Peak	Spacewatch	·	2.2 km	MPC · JPL
822024	2015 OU_{20}	—	July 18, 2015	Haleakala	Pan-STARRS 1	·	2.2 km	MPC · JPL
822025	2015 OA_{21}	—	October 10, 2008	Mount Lemmon	Mount Lemmon Survey	·	1.1 km	MPC · JPL
822026	2015 OY_{21}	—	June 24, 2015	Haleakala	Pan-STARRS 1	H	340 m	MPC · JPL
822027	2015 OU_{22}	—	September 2, 2008	Kitt Peak	Spacewatch	MAS	610 m	MPC · JPL
822028	2015 OP_{26}	—	July 19, 2015	Haleakala	Pan-STARRS 1	·	2.8 km	MPC · JPL
822029	2015 OZ_{27}	—	July 23, 2015	Haleakala	Pan-STARRS 1	·	510 m	MPC · JPL
822030	2015 OQ_{28}	—	July 23, 2015	Haleakala	Pan-STARRS 1	·	690 m	MPC · JPL
822031	2015 OH_{30}	—	July 23, 2015	Haleakala	Pan-STARRS 1	·	490 m	MPC · JPL
822032	2015 OF_{34}	—	June 20, 2015	Haleakala	Pan-STARRS 1	·	1.4 km	MPC · JPL
822033	2015 OR_{36}	—	May 21, 2014	Haleakala	Pan-STARRS 1	·	1.8 km	MPC · JPL
822034	2015 OB_{38}	—	February 26, 2014	Haleakala	Pan-STARRS 1	·	790 m	MPC · JPL
822035	2015 OK_{42}	—	April 2, 2011	Haleakala	Pan-STARRS 1	·	550 m	MPC · JPL
822036	2015 OY_{42}	—	August 22, 2001	Kitt Peak	Spacewatch	·	670 m	MPC · JPL
822037	2015 OC_{43}	—	October 5, 2012	Kitt Peak	Spacewatch	·	490 m	MPC · JPL
822038	2015 OH_{43}	—	November 6, 2008	Mount Lemmon	Mount Lemmon Survey	·	980 m	MPC · JPL
822039	2015 OR_{44}	—	June 28, 2015	Haleakala	Pan-STARRS 1	·	920 m	MPC · JPL
822040	2015 OL_{45}	—	October 29, 2005	Catalina	CSS	·	620 m	MPC · JPL
822041	2015 OQ_{45}	—	July 24, 2015	Haleakala	Pan-STARRS 1	·	1.0 km	MPC · JPL
822042	2015 OA_{47}	—	June 17, 2015	Haleakala	Pan-STARRS 1	·	2.1 km	MPC · JPL
822043	2015 OV_{47}	—	August 30, 2005	Kitt Peak	Spacewatch	·	540 m	MPC · JPL
822044	2015 OC_{50}	—	July 26, 2015	Haleakala	Pan-STARRS 1	PHO	640 m	MPC · JPL
822045	2015 OR_{51}	—	September 1, 2005	Palomar	NEAT	·	540 m	MPC · JPL
822046	2015 OA_{55}	—	September 30, 2006	Catalina	CSS	·	1.5 km	MPC · JPL
822047	2015 ON_{58}	—	April 21, 2011	Haleakala	Pan-STARRS 1	·	520 m	MPC · JPL
822048	2015 OR_{63}	—	July 26, 2015	Haleakala	Pan-STARRS 1	·	2.6 km	MPC · JPL
822049	2015 OQ_{64}	—	May 7, 2014	Haleakala	Pan-STARRS 1	·	1.6 km	MPC · JPL
822050	2015 OC_{69}	—	June 14, 2015	Mount Lemmon	Mount Lemmon Survey	·	590 m	MPC · JPL
822051	2015 OD_{70}	—	June 28, 2015	Haleakala	Pan-STARRS 1	·	610 m	MPC · JPL
822052	2015 OJ_{70}	—	October 1, 2008	Mount Lemmon	Mount Lemmon Survey	NYS	840 m	MPC · JPL
822053	2015 OU_{70}	—	July 27, 2015	Haleakala	Pan-STARRS 1	·	1.7 km	MPC · JPL
822054	2015 ON_{71}	—	August 31, 2005	Kitt Peak	Spacewatch	·	490 m	MPC · JPL
822055	2015 OQ_{75}	—	September 30, 2005	Palomar	NEAT	·	500 m	MPC · JPL
822056	2015 OQ_{76}	—	July 28, 2011	Haleakala	Pan-STARRS 1	·	930 m	MPC · JPL
822057	2015 OC_{77}	—	February 26, 2014	Haleakala	Pan-STARRS 1	·	1.0 km	MPC · JPL
822058	2015 OW_{78}	—	June 27, 2015	Haleakala	Pan-STARRS 2	H	500 m	MPC · JPL
822059	2015 OM_{81}	—	July 24, 2015	Haleakala	Pan-STARRS 1	H	390 m	MPC · JPL
822060	2015 OJ_{82}	—	July 23, 2015	Haleakala	Pan-STARRS 1	·	1.1 km	MPC · JPL
822061	2015 OK_{82}	—	July 23, 2015	Haleakala	Pan-STARRS 1	·	1.9 km	MPC · JPL
822062	2015 OL_{82}	—	December 1, 2005	Kitt Peak	L. H. Wasserman, R. L. Millis	THM	1.8 km	MPC · JPL
822063	2015 OK_{85}	—	July 24, 2015	Haleakala	Pan-STARRS 1	·	1.7 km	MPC · JPL
822064	2015 OR_{86}	—	February 26, 2007	Mount Lemmon	Mount Lemmon Survey	·	620 m	MPC · JPL
822065	2015 OT_{89}	—	March 24, 2014	Haleakala	Pan-STARRS 1	(13314)	1.4 km	MPC · JPL
822066	2015 OP_{93}	—	October 11, 2010	Mount Lemmon	Mount Lemmon Survey	TIR	2.0 km	MPC · JPL
822067	2015 OS_{100}	—	May 7, 2014	Haleakala	Pan-STARRS 1	EOS	1.1 km	MPC · JPL
822068	2015 OX_{101}	—	May 28, 2014	Haleakala	Pan-STARRS 1	·	1.2 km	MPC · JPL
822069	2015 OS_{103}	—	May 25, 2014	Mount Lemmon	Mount Lemmon Survey	EUN	1.2 km	MPC · JPL
822070	2015 OD_{105}	—	June 3, 2014	Haleakala	Pan-STARRS 1	·	1.4 km	MPC · JPL
822071	2015 OS_{107}	—	July 23, 2015	Haleakala	Pan-STARRS 1	·	1.5 km	MPC · JPL
822072	2015 OS_{108}	—	July 23, 2015	Haleakala	Pan-STARRS 1	·	810 m	MPC · JPL
822073	2015 OU_{108}	—	July 23, 2015	Haleakala	Pan-STARRS 1	·	600 m	MPC · JPL
822074	2015 OW_{109}	—	August 30, 2005	Kitt Peak	Spacewatch	·	420 m	MPC · JPL
822075	2015 OE_{112}	—	July 25, 2015	Haleakala	Pan-STARRS 1	EOS	1.5 km	MPC · JPL
822076	2015 OW_{114}	—	July 25, 2015	Haleakala	Pan-STARRS 1	·	2.0 km	MPC · JPL
822077	2015 OK_{115}	—	July 23, 2015	Haleakala	Pan-STARRS 1	·	590 m	MPC · JPL
822078	2015 ON_{120}	—	August 24, 2008	Kitt Peak	Spacewatch	·	520 m	MPC · JPL
822079	2015 OJ_{121}	—	July 23, 2015	Haleakala	Pan-STARRS 1	·	540 m	MPC · JPL
822080	2015 OR_{124}	—	July 30, 2015	Haleakala	Pan-STARRS 1	·	590 m	MPC · JPL
822081	2015 OS_{124}	—	July 23, 2015	Haleakala	Pan-STARRS 1	·	550 m	MPC · JPL
822082	2015 OM_{125}	—	July 24, 2015	Haleakala	Pan-STARRS 1	·	2.2 km	MPC · JPL
822083	2015 OJ_{126}	—	July 25, 2015	Haleakala	Pan-STARRS 1	·	1.5 km	MPC · JPL
822084	2015 OB_{127}	—	July 25, 2015	Haleakala	Pan-STARRS 1	·	1.3 km	MPC · JPL
822085	2015 OQ_{127}	—	July 25, 2015	Haleakala	Pan-STARRS 1	EOS	1.5 km	MPC · JPL
822086	2015 OF_{128}	—	July 23, 2015	Haleakala	Pan-STARRS 2	EOS	1.2 km	MPC · JPL
822087	2015 OS_{128}	—	July 25, 2015	Haleakala	Pan-STARRS 1	·	1.7 km	MPC · JPL
822088	2015 OX_{128}	—	July 26, 2015	Haleakala	Pan-STARRS 1	·	1.6 km	MPC · JPL
822089	2015 OY_{129}	—	July 19, 2015	Haleakala	Pan-STARRS 1	·	550 m	MPC · JPL
822090	2015 OD_{132}	—	July 24, 2015	Haleakala	Pan-STARRS 1	MAS	570 m	MPC · JPL
822091	2015 OT_{136}	—	July 25, 2015	Haleakala	Pan-STARRS 1	NAE	1.9 km	MPC · JPL
822092	2015 OW_{136}	—	July 25, 2015	Haleakala	Pan-STARRS 1	·	1.5 km	MPC · JPL
822093	2015 OG_{141}	—	July 19, 2015	Haleakala	Pan-STARRS 1	·	1.0 km	MPC · JPL
822094	2015 OU_{143}	—	July 28, 2015	Haleakala	Pan-STARRS 1	·	1.9 km	MPC · JPL
822095	2015 OU_{144}	—	July 24, 2015	Haleakala	Pan-STARRS 1	·	670 m	MPC · JPL
822096	2015 OX_{144}	—	July 25, 2015	Haleakala	Pan-STARRS 1	·	580 m	MPC · JPL
822097	2015 OV_{150}	—	July 25, 2015	Haleakala	Pan-STARRS 1	·	570 m	MPC · JPL
822098	2015 OB_{151}	—	July 23, 2015	Haleakala	Pan-STARRS 1	·	2.0 km	MPC · JPL
822099	2015 ON_{151}	—	December 7, 2005	Kitt Peak	Spacewatch	·	2.0 km	MPC · JPL
822100	2015 ON_{153}	—	July 23, 2015	Haleakala	Pan-STARRS 1	·	1.6 km	MPC · JPL

== 822101–822200 ==
back to top

Designation			Discovery			Properties		Ref
Permanent	Provisional	Named after	Date	Site	Discoverer(s)	Category	Diam.	Ref
822101	2015 OV_{154}	—	December 1, 2005	Mount Lemmon	Mount Lemmon Survey	·	2.0 km	MPC · JPL
822102	2015 OF_{155}	—	July 19, 2015	Haleakala	Pan-STARRS 1	·	2.3 km	MPC · JPL
822103	2015 OR_{155}	—	July 23, 2015	Haleakala	Pan-STARRS 1	EOS	1.4 km	MPC · JPL
822104	2015 OJ_{156}	—	July 23, 2015	Haleakala	Pan-STARRS 2	·	1.8 km	MPC · JPL
822105	2015 OA_{163}	—	July 28, 2015	Haleakala	Pan-STARRS 1	·	600 m	MPC · JPL
822106	2015 OK_{163}	—	July 23, 2015	Haleakala	Pan-STARRS 1	·	520 m	MPC · JPL
822107	2015 OW_{166}	—	July 25, 2015	Haleakala	Pan-STARRS 1	·	2.5 km	MPC · JPL
822108	2015 OB_{168}	—	February 28, 2008	Mount Lemmon	Mount Lemmon Survey	·	1.6 km	MPC · JPL
822109	2015 OC_{168}	—	July 28, 2015	Haleakala	Pan-STARRS 1	·	2.1 km	MPC · JPL
822110	2015 OA_{169}	—	July 23, 2015	Haleakala	Pan-STARRS 1	·	1.9 km	MPC · JPL
822111	2015 OA_{173}	—	July 23, 2015	Haleakala	Pan-STARRS 1	PHO	590 m	MPC · JPL
822112	2015 OF_{175}	—	May 27, 2011	Kitt Peak	Spacewatch	·	590 m	MPC · JPL
822113	2015 OL_{177}	—	July 24, 2015	Haleakala	Pan-STARRS 1	·	1.4 km	MPC · JPL
822114	2015 OZ_{191}	—	September 12, 2015	Haleakala	Pan-STARRS 1	·	1.4 km	MPC · JPL
822115	2015 PA_{1}	—	April 26, 2011	Kitt Peak	Spacewatch	·	1.1 km	MPC · JPL
822116	2015 PD_{6}	—	July 8, 2015	Kitt Peak	Spacewatch	·	1.1 km	MPC · JPL
822117	2015 PF_{6}	—	July 25, 2011	Haleakala	Pan-STARRS 1	·	720 m	MPC · JPL
822118	2015 PH_{6}	—	April 4, 2011	Kitt Peak	Spacewatch	·	910 m	MPC · JPL
822119	2015 PR_{11}	—	July 19, 2015	Haleakala	Pan-STARRS 1	·	560 m	MPC · JPL
822120	2015 PT_{11}	—	July 25, 2015	Haleakala	Pan-STARRS 1	·	1.1 km	MPC · JPL
822121	2015 PN_{13}	—	June 20, 2015	Haleakala	Pan-STARRS 1	EOS	1.4 km	MPC · JPL
822122	2015 PO_{13}	—	April 4, 2014	Mount Lemmon	Mount Lemmon Survey	·	1.6 km	MPC · JPL
822123	2015 PE_{16}	—	March 11, 2011	Mount Lemmon	Mount Lemmon Survey	·	760 m	MPC · JPL
822124	2015 PD_{17}	—	November 21, 2008	Mount Lemmon	Mount Lemmon Survey	·	940 m	MPC · JPL
822125	2015 PF_{21}	—	March 11, 2007	Mount Lemmon	Mount Lemmon Survey	·	920 m	MPC · JPL
822126	2015 PH_{22}	—	August 8, 2015	Haleakala	Pan-STARRS 1	·	580 m	MPC · JPL
822127	2015 PQ_{24}	—	August 8, 2015	Haleakala	Pan-STARRS 1	·	620 m	MPC · JPL
822128	2015 PE_{28}	—	October 1, 2005	Mount Lemmon	Mount Lemmon Survey	·	580 m	MPC · JPL
822129	2015 PE_{29}	—	July 24, 2015	Haleakala	Pan-STARRS 1	·	790 m	MPC · JPL
822130	2015 PL_{32}	—	September 14, 2007	Mount Lemmon	Mount Lemmon Survey	·	940 m	MPC · JPL
822131	2015 PQ_{34}	—	June 21, 2015	Haleakala	Pan-STARRS 2	PHO	1 km	MPC · JPL
822132	2015 PU_{34}	—	October 6, 2012	Haleakala	Pan-STARRS 1	·	610 m	MPC · JPL
822133	2015 PC_{36}	—	May 2, 2014	Mount Lemmon	Mount Lemmon Survey	HOF	2.1 km	MPC · JPL
822134	2015 PK_{37}	—	July 28, 2015	Haleakala	Pan-STARRS 1	GEF	800 m	MPC · JPL
822135	2015 PW_{39}	—	July 24, 2015	Haleakala	Pan-STARRS 1	EMA	2.2 km	MPC · JPL
822136	2015 PC_{40}	—	April 22, 2007	Kitt Peak	Spacewatch	·	940 m	MPC · JPL
822137	2015 PF_{42}	—	May 22, 2011	Mount Lemmon	Mount Lemmon Survey	·	730 m	MPC · JPL
822138	2015 PX_{42}	—	February 14, 2013	Kitt Peak	Spacewatch	·	2.5 km	MPC · JPL
822139	2015 PC_{43}	—	July 24, 2015	Haleakala	Pan-STARRS 1	SYL	3.2 km	MPC · JPL
822140	2015 PF_{44}	—	July 19, 2015	Haleakala	Pan-STARRS 2	EUN	910 m	MPC · JPL
822141	2015 PY_{45}	—	May 23, 2011	Mount Lemmon	Mount Lemmon Survey	·	760 m	MPC · JPL
822142	2015 PC_{46}	—	May 23, 2014	Haleakala	Pan-STARRS 1	·	2.3 km	MPC · JPL
822143	2015 PZ_{47}	—	September 18, 2003	Palomar	NEAT	·	860 m	MPC · JPL
822144	2015 PK_{48}	—	July 24, 2015	Haleakala	Pan-STARRS 1	·	970 m	MPC · JPL
822145	2015 PS_{52}	—	August 9, 2015	Haleakala	Pan-STARRS 1	·	2.4 km	MPC · JPL
822146	2015 PY_{52}	—	August 9, 2015	Haleakala	Pan-STARRS 1	PHO	680 m	MPC · JPL
822147	2015 PN_{54}	—	August 9, 2015	Haleakala	Pan-STARRS 1	·	570 m	MPC · JPL
822148	2015 PC_{56}	—	October 23, 2011	Haleakala	Pan-STARRS 1	BAR	870 m	MPC · JPL
822149	2015 PD_{56}	—	August 9, 2015	Haleakala	Pan-STARRS 1	·	540 m	MPC · JPL
822150	2015 PR_{58}	—	June 25, 2011	Mount Lemmon	Mount Lemmon Survey	·	950 m	MPC · JPL
822151	2015 PV_{68}	—	March 22, 2014	Mount Lemmon	Mount Lemmon Survey	·	1.5 km	MPC · JPL
822152	2015 PY_{68}	—	October 4, 2011	Piszkés-tető	K. Sárneczky, S. Kürti	·	1.7 km	MPC · JPL
822153	2015 PR_{74}	—	October 7, 2005	Catalina	CSS	·	560 m	MPC · JPL
822154	2015 PL_{80}	—	January 29, 2014	Kitt Peak	Spacewatch	·	770 m	MPC · JPL
822155	2015 PP_{80}	—	October 4, 2005	Mount Lemmon	Mount Lemmon Survey	·	1.6 km	MPC · JPL
822156	2015 PJ_{83}	—	April 8, 2014	Mount Lemmon	Mount Lemmon Survey	·	2.0 km	MPC · JPL
822157	2015 PT_{85}	—	March 28, 2011	Kitt Peak	Spacewatch	·	520 m	MPC · JPL
822158	2015 PC_{88}	—	June 27, 2015	Haleakala	Pan-STARRS 2	·	570 m	MPC · JPL
822159	2015 PH_{88}	—	June 29, 2015	Haleakala	Pan-STARRS 1	·	620 m	MPC · JPL
822160	2015 PD_{91}	—	January 24, 2014	Haleakala	Pan-STARRS 1	·	840 m	MPC · JPL
822161	2015 PF_{96}	—	September 29, 2005	Mount Lemmon	Mount Lemmon Survey	·	510 m	MPC · JPL
822162	2015 PN_{96}	—	January 12, 2010	Kitt Peak	Spacewatch	NYS	910 m	MPC · JPL
822163	2015 PR_{96}	—	September 28, 2011	Bergisch Gladbach	W. Bickel	·	870 m	MPC · JPL
822164	2015 PO_{102}	—	October 9, 2012	Haleakala	Pan-STARRS 1	·	500 m	MPC · JPL
822165	2015 PR_{103}	—	September 4, 2008	Kitt Peak	Spacewatch	·	780 m	MPC · JPL
822166	2015 PW_{103}	—	February 3, 2013	Haleakala	Pan-STARRS 1	·	1.4 km	MPC · JPL
822167	2015 PW_{105}	—	April 23, 2014	Haleakala	Pan-STARRS 1	·	1.7 km	MPC · JPL
822168	2015 PG_{109}	—	January 11, 2003	Kitt Peak	Spacewatch	·	840 m	MPC · JPL
822169	2015 PD_{112}	—	February 26, 2004	Kitt Peak	Deep Ecliptic Survey	·	500 m	MPC · JPL
822170	2015 PO_{120}	—	February 20, 2006	Kitt Peak	Spacewatch	·	820 m	MPC · JPL
822171	2015 PG_{125}	—	May 13, 2011	Mount Lemmon	Mount Lemmon Survey	·	570 m	MPC · JPL
822172	2015 PX_{129}	—	August 10, 2015	Haleakala	Pan-STARRS 1	V	480 m	MPC · JPL
822173	2015 PP_{137}	—	October 25, 2005	Mount Lemmon	Mount Lemmon Survey	·	550 m	MPC · JPL
822174	2015 PW_{138}	—	September 18, 2011	Mount Lemmon	Mount Lemmon Survey	·	1.1 km	MPC · JPL
822175	2015 PR_{139}	—	May 4, 2014	Mount Lemmon	Mount Lemmon Survey	·	2.0 km	MPC · JPL
822176	2015 PK_{140}	—	August 10, 2015	Haleakala	Pan-STARRS 1	V	410 m	MPC · JPL
822177	2015 PJ_{143}	—	October 20, 2011	Mount Lemmon	Mount Lemmon Survey	·	1.5 km	MPC · JPL
822178	2015 PA_{144}	—	August 27, 2011	Piszkés-tető	K. Sárneczky	·	1.6 km	MPC · JPL
822179	2015 PM_{144}	—	October 20, 2011	Mount Lemmon	Mount Lemmon Survey	·	1.5 km	MPC · JPL
822180	2015 PX_{144}	—	July 25, 2015	Haleakala	Pan-STARRS 1	·	1.5 km	MPC · JPL
822181	2015 PM_{148}	—	August 10, 2015	Haleakala	Pan-STARRS 1	·	1.6 km	MPC · JPL
822182	2015 PA_{149}	—	July 18, 2015	Haleakala	Pan-STARRS 1	·	1.7 km	MPC · JPL
822183	2015 PQ_{153}	—	August 10, 2015	Haleakala	Pan-STARRS 1	PHO	630 m	MPC · JPL
822184	2015 PE_{157}	—	November 20, 2011	Zelenchukskaya	T. V. Krjačko, B. Satovski	DOR	1.6 km	MPC · JPL
822185	2015 PA_{161}	—	July 24, 2015	Haleakala	Pan-STARRS 1	AEO	780 m	MPC · JPL
822186	2015 PS_{161}	—	April 2, 2011	Kitt Peak	Spacewatch	·	650 m	MPC · JPL
822187	2015 PR_{169}	—	February 9, 2013	Haleakala	Pan-STARRS 1	·	830 m	MPC · JPL
822188	2015 PY_{171}	—	July 24, 2015	Haleakala	Pan-STARRS 1	·	1.9 km	MPC · JPL
822189	2015 PC_{176}	—	August 10, 2015	Haleakala	Pan-STARRS 1	·	930 m	MPC · JPL
822190	2015 PJ_{177}	—	August 10, 2015	Haleakala	Pan-STARRS 1	·	880 m	MPC · JPL
822191	2015 PR_{182}	—	August 10, 2015	Haleakala	Pan-STARRS 1	·	550 m	MPC · JPL
822192	2015 PS_{183}	—	August 10, 2015	Haleakala	Pan-STARRS 1	·	570 m	MPC · JPL
822193	2015 PE_{184}	—	July 24, 2015	Haleakala	Pan-STARRS 1	PHO	650 m	MPC · JPL
822194	2015 PQ_{187}	—	March 7, 2014	Mount Lemmon	Mount Lemmon Survey	·	830 m	MPC · JPL
822195	2015 PL_{188}	—	March 21, 2009	Mount Lemmon	Mount Lemmon Survey	·	1.7 km	MPC · JPL
822196	2015 PW_{198}	—	March 28, 2011	Mount Lemmon	Mount Lemmon Survey	·	550 m	MPC · JPL
822197	2015 PZ_{199}	—	August 10, 2015	Haleakala	Pan-STARRS 1	·	960 m	MPC · JPL
822198	2015 PW_{203}	—	May 8, 2014	Haleakala	Pan-STARRS 1	·	1.9 km	MPC · JPL
822199	2015 PA_{207}	—	August 10, 2015	Haleakala	Pan-STARRS 1	BRA	1.4 km	MPC · JPL
822200	2015 PV_{208}	—	August 10, 2015	Haleakala	Pan-STARRS 1	·	2.4 km	MPC · JPL

== 822201–822300 ==
back to top

Designation			Discovery			Properties		Ref
Permanent	Provisional	Named after	Date	Site	Discoverer(s)	Category	Diam.	Ref
822201	2015 PM_{212}	—	August 10, 2015	Haleakala	Pan-STARRS 1	H	300 m	MPC · JPL
822202	2015 PM_{213}	—	August 8, 2015	Haleakala	Pan-STARRS 1	PHO	700 m	MPC · JPL
822203	2015 PR_{220}	—	May 21, 2014	Haleakala	Pan-STARRS 1	·	2.3 km	MPC · JPL
822204	2015 PV_{220}	—	August 10, 2015	Haleakala	Pan-STARRS 1	H	340 m	MPC · JPL
822205	2015 PB_{221}	—	August 10, 2015	Haleakala	Pan-STARRS 1	·	2.5 km	MPC · JPL
822206	2015 PN_{224}	—	November 17, 2011	Mount Lemmon	Mount Lemmon Survey	·	2.5 km	MPC · JPL
822207	2015 PQ_{232}	—	June 26, 2015	Haleakala	Pan-STARRS 1	EOS	1.3 km	MPC · JPL
822208	2015 PF_{234}	—	April 24, 2007	Kitt Peak	Spacewatch	NYS	860 m	MPC · JPL
822209	2015 PO_{237}	—	August 10, 2015	Haleakala	Pan-STARRS 1	·	1.9 km	MPC · JPL
822210	2015 PE_{239}	—	September 29, 2011	Kitt Peak	Spacewatch	·	1.3 km	MPC · JPL
822211	2015 PJ_{241}	—	July 19, 2015	Haleakala	Pan-STARRS 1	·	1.8 km	MPC · JPL
822212	2015 PE_{243}	—	February 24, 2014	Haleakala	Pan-STARRS 1	·	1.2 km	MPC · JPL
822213	2015 PK_{243}	—	July 24, 2015	Haleakala	Pan-STARRS 1	·	2.0 km	MPC · JPL
822214	2015 PD_{245}	—	October 21, 2012	Mount Lemmon	Mount Lemmon Survey	·	480 m	MPC · JPL
822215	2015 PY_{247}	—	November 4, 2012	Mount Lemmon	Mount Lemmon Survey	·	830 m	MPC · JPL
822216	2015 PE_{251}	—	March 4, 2014	Haleakala	Pan-STARRS 1	·	1.0 km	MPC · JPL
822217	2015 PV_{252}	—	August 10, 2015	Haleakala	Pan-STARRS 1	·	2.1 km	MPC · JPL
822218	2015 PH_{256}	—	March 2, 2011	Kitt Peak	Spacewatch	NYS	640 m	MPC · JPL
822219	2015 PL_{262}	—	June 27, 2015	Haleakala	Pan-STARRS 2	·	1.1 km	MPC · JPL
822220	2015 PZ_{264}	—	October 26, 2011	Haleakala	Pan-STARRS 1	DOR	1.6 km	MPC · JPL
822221	2015 PP_{268}	—	June 17, 2015	Haleakala	Pan-STARRS 1	·	710 m	MPC · JPL
822222	2015 PW_{269}	—	July 24, 2015	Haleakala	Pan-STARRS 1	·	510 m	MPC · JPL
822223	2015 PF_{273}	—	August 11, 2015	Haleakala	Pan-STARRS 1	·	1.3 km	MPC · JPL
822224	2015 PD_{277}	—	February 3, 2012	Haleakala	Pan-STARRS 1	·	3.1 km	MPC · JPL
822225	2015 PW_{283}	—	August 12, 2015	Haleakala	Pan-STARRS 1	·	500 m	MPC · JPL
822226	2015 PS_{284}	—	August 12, 2015	Haleakala	Pan-STARRS 1	(2076)	600 m	MPC · JPL
822227	2015 PQ_{287}	—	May 8, 2014	Haleakala	Pan-STARRS 1	EOS	1.3 km	MPC · JPL
822228	2015 PS_{289}	—	July 19, 2015	Haleakala	Pan-STARRS 1	·	2.3 km	MPC · JPL
822229	2015 PS_{290}	—	August 12, 2015	Haleakala	Pan-STARRS 1	·	680 m	MPC · JPL
822230	2015 PQ_{292}	—	July 23, 2015	Haleakala	Pan-STARRS 2	·	1.1 km	MPC · JPL
822231	2015 PX_{295}	—	July 23, 2015	Haleakala	Pan-STARRS 1	·	560 m	MPC · JPL
822232	2015 PA_{296}	—	April 30, 2011	Kitt Peak	Spacewatch	·	650 m	MPC · JPL
822233	2015 PZ_{300}	—	February 11, 2014	Mount Lemmon	Mount Lemmon Survey	H	440 m	MPC · JPL
822234	2015 PE_{302}	—	May 12, 2011	Mount Lemmon	Mount Lemmon Survey	·	720 m	MPC · JPL
822235	2015 PE_{303}	—	August 13, 2015	Haleakala	Pan-STARRS 1	·	1.9 km	MPC · JPL
822236	2015 PB_{310}	—	September 23, 2011	Haleakala	Pan-STARRS 1	(5)	1.1 km	MPC · JPL
822237	2015 PM_{312}	—	August 5, 2015	Palomar	Palomar Transient Factory	·	1.1 km	MPC · JPL
822238	2015 PC_{316}	—	August 9, 2015	Haleakala	Pan-STARRS 2	·	2.3 km	MPC · JPL
822239	2015 PC_{317}	—	May 23, 2014	Haleakala	Pan-STARRS 1	·	2.4 km	MPC · JPL
822240	2015 PM_{320}	—	October 17, 2010	Mount Lemmon	Mount Lemmon Survey	·	1.5 km	MPC · JPL
822241	2015 PY_{320}	—	July 26, 2011	Haleakala	Pan-STARRS 1	·	790 m	MPC · JPL
822242	2015 PC_{321}	—	June 27, 2014	Haleakala	Pan-STARRS 1	·	2.2 km	MPC · JPL
822243	2015 PZ_{323}	—	August 10, 2015	Haleakala	Pan-STARRS 2	H	340 m	MPC · JPL
822244	2015 PT_{324}	—	August 12, 2015	Haleakala	Pan-STARRS 1	·	530 m	MPC · JPL
822245	2015 PX_{324}	—	August 9, 2015	Haleakala	Pan-STARRS 1	·	480 m	MPC · JPL
822246	2015 PT_{328}	—	August 10, 2015	Haleakala	Pan-STARRS 1	·	2.1 km	MPC · JPL
822247	2015 PU_{328}	—	August 14, 2015	Haleakala	Pan-STARRS 1	·	560 m	MPC · JPL
822248	2015 PD_{331}	—	August 13, 2015	Kitt Peak	Spacewatch	·	850 m	MPC · JPL
822249	2015 PE_{331}	—	August 10, 2015	Haleakala	Pan-STARRS 1	·	580 m	MPC · JPL
822250	2015 PN_{331}	—	August 9, 2015	Haleakala	Pan-STARRS 1	·	1.9 km	MPC · JPL
822251	2015 PO_{331}	—	August 11, 2015	Haleakala	Pan-STARRS 1	·	2.0 km	MPC · JPL
822252	2015 PZ_{331}	—	August 14, 2015	Haleakala	Pan-STARRS 1	VER	2.1 km	MPC · JPL
822253	2015 PG_{333}	—	August 7, 2015	Haleakala	Pan-STARRS 1	H	330 m	MPC · JPL
822254	2015 PV_{334}	—	August 12, 2015	Haleakala	Pan-STARRS 1	·	2.5 km	MPC · JPL
822255	2015 PJ_{335}	—	August 14, 2015	Haleakala	Pan-STARRS 1	·	2.3 km	MPC · JPL
822256	2015 PP_{336}	—	August 12, 2015	Haleakala	Pan-STARRS 1	·	1.6 km	MPC · JPL
822257	2015 PG_{338}	—	August 12, 2015	Haleakala	Pan-STARRS 1	VER	2.1 km	MPC · JPL
822258	2015 PC_{340}	—	August 10, 2015	Haleakala	Pan-STARRS 1	·	1.7 km	MPC · JPL
822259	2015 PN_{342}	—	August 3, 2015	Haleakala	Pan-STARRS 1	·	1.2 km	MPC · JPL
822260	2015 PA_{345}	—	August 9, 2015	Haleakala	Pan-STARRS 1	·	610 m	MPC · JPL
822261	2015 PE_{345}	—	August 13, 2015	Haleakala	Pan-STARRS 1	NYS	750 m	MPC · JPL
822262	2015 PY_{345}	—	August 13, 2015	Kitt Peak	Spacewatch	·	1.8 km	MPC · JPL
822263	2015 PG_{346}	—	August 12, 2015	Haleakala	Pan-STARRS 1	·	560 m	MPC · JPL
822264	2015 PB_{347}	—	August 11, 2015	Haleakala	Pan-STARRS 1	·	1.8 km	MPC · JPL
822265	2015 PV_{347}	—	May 7, 2014	Haleakala	Pan-STARRS 1	·	2.4 km	MPC · JPL
822266	2015 PG_{349}	—	May 6, 2014	Haleakala	Pan-STARRS 1	·	2.4 km	MPC · JPL
822267	2015 PQ_{350}	—	August 13, 2015	Haleakala	Pan-STARRS 1	·	2.5 km	MPC · JPL
822268	2015 PF_{351}	—	August 10, 2015	Haleakala	Pan-STARRS 1	·	2.0 km	MPC · JPL
822269	2015 PA_{353}	—	August 12, 2015	Haleakala	Pan-STARRS 1	·	2.1 km	MPC · JPL
822270	2015 PG_{353}	—	August 12, 2015	Haleakala	Pan-STARRS 1	·	1.4 km	MPC · JPL
822271	2015 PM_{354}	—	August 10, 2015	Haleakala	Pan-STARRS 2	·	850 m	MPC · JPL
822272	2015 PD_{373}	—	August 14, 2015	Haleakala	Pan-STARRS 1	·	2.4 km	MPC · JPL
822273	2015 QG_{1}	—	November 21, 2008	Kitt Peak	Spacewatch	·	930 m	MPC · JPL
822274	2015 QJ_{2}	—	June 25, 2015	Haleakala	Pan-STARRS 1	·	1.3 km	MPC · JPL
822275	2015 QE_{3}	—	November 10, 2005	Mount Lemmon	Mount Lemmon Survey	·	560 m	MPC · JPL
822276	2015 QO_{5}	—	July 14, 2015	Haleakala	Pan-STARRS 1	·	1.7 km	MPC · JPL
822277	2015 QC_{6}	—	March 15, 2007	Mount Lemmon	Mount Lemmon Survey	NYS	920 m	MPC · JPL
822278	2015 QH_{6}	—	October 28, 2010	Mount Lemmon	Mount Lemmon Survey	THM	1.6 km	MPC · JPL
822279	2015 QR_{7}	—	August 13, 2004	Palomar	NEAT	·	2.2 km	MPC · JPL
822280	2015 QZ_{10}	—	October 24, 2011	Haleakala	Pan-STARRS 1	·	1.3 km	MPC · JPL
822281	2015 QB_{14}	—	August 21, 2015	Haleakala	Pan-STARRS 1	·	1.7 km	MPC · JPL
822282	2015 QJ_{15}	—	October 23, 2011	Kitt Peak	Spacewatch	MRX	720 m	MPC · JPL
822283	2015 QF_{16}	—	August 21, 2015	Haleakala	Pan-STARRS 1	·	780 m	MPC · JPL
822284	2015 QO_{17}	—	May 3, 2014	Kitt Peak	Spacewatch	·	1.9 km	MPC · JPL
822285	2015 QZ_{17}	—	August 21, 2015	Haleakala	Pan-STARRS 1	·	2.3 km	MPC · JPL
822286	2015 QS_{19}	—	August 21, 2015	Haleakala	Pan-STARRS 1	·	1.1 km	MPC · JPL
822287	2015 QR_{20}	—	August 21, 2015	Haleakala	Pan-STARRS 1	MAS	520 m	MPC · JPL
822288	2015 QS_{20}	—	August 21, 2015	Haleakala	Pan-STARRS 1	·	2.4 km	MPC · JPL
822289	2015 QP_{22}	—	August 21, 2015	Haleakala	Pan-STARRS 1	·	2.2 km	MPC · JPL
822290	2015 QR_{22}	—	August 21, 2015	Haleakala	Pan-STARRS 1	·	1.5 km	MPC · JPL
822291	2015 QU_{22}	—	August 21, 2015	Haleakala	Pan-STARRS 1	·	2.1 km	MPC · JPL
822292	2015 QT_{24}	—	August 23, 2015	Roque de los Muchachos	EURONEAR	·	2.2 km	MPC · JPL
822293	2015 QS_{25}	—	August 21, 2015	Haleakala	Pan-STARRS 1	·	2.1 km	MPC · JPL
822294	2015 QJ_{26}	—	August 21, 2015	Haleakala	Pan-STARRS 1	·	790 m	MPC · JPL
822295	2015 QF_{33}	—	August 20, 2015	Kitt Peak	Spacewatch	·	620 m	MPC · JPL
822296	2015 QG_{35}	—	August 21, 2015	Haleakala	Pan-STARRS 1	·	2.3 km	MPC · JPL
822297	2015 QY_{35}	—	August 21, 2015	Haleakala	Pan-STARRS 1	·	2.0 km	MPC · JPL
822298	2015 QY_{41}	—	August 21, 2015	Westfield	International Astronomical Search Collaboration	EUN	930 m	MPC · JPL
822299	2015 RF_{1}	—	June 17, 2015	Haleakala	Pan-STARRS 1	·	960 m	MPC · JPL
822300	2015 RX_{1}	—	July 1, 2008	Catalina	CSS	·	710 m	MPC · JPL

== 822301–822400 ==
back to top

Designation			Discovery			Properties		Ref
Permanent	Provisional	Named after	Date	Site	Discoverer(s)	Category	Diam.	Ref
822301	2015 RZ_{3}	—	June 17, 2015	Haleakala	Pan-STARRS 1	·	1.9 km	MPC · JPL
822302	2015 RO_{9}	—	October 15, 2004	Mount Lemmon	Mount Lemmon Survey	·	990 m	MPC · JPL
822303	2015 RO_{11}	—	August 20, 2004	Kitt Peak	Spacewatch	NYS	720 m	MPC · JPL
822304	2015 RT_{11}	—	January 25, 2009	Kitt Peak	Spacewatch	·	1.2 km	MPC · JPL
822305	2015 RH_{12}	—	November 30, 2005	Mount Lemmon	Mount Lemmon Survey	·	1.9 km	MPC · JPL
822306	2015 RC_{14}	—	July 18, 2015	Haleakala	Pan-STARRS 1	H	320 m	MPC · JPL
822307	2015 RK_{14}	—	April 28, 2011	Haleakala	Pan-STARRS 1	·	580 m	MPC · JPL
822308	2015 RH_{15}	—	September 5, 2015	Haleakala	Pan-STARRS 1	EOS	1.4 km	MPC · JPL
822309	2015 RE_{19}	—	July 23, 2015	Haleakala	Pan-STARRS 1	NYS	920 m	MPC · JPL
822310	2015 RN_{22}	—	May 30, 2003	Cerro Tololo	Deep Ecliptic Survey	NYS	840 m	MPC · JPL
822311	2015 RX_{22}	—	May 24, 2011	Haleakala	Pan-STARRS 1	NYS	780 m	MPC · JPL
822312	2015 RS_{24}	—	July 25, 2015	Haleakala	Pan-STARRS 1	H	380 m	MPC · JPL
822313	2015 RV_{24}	—	May 14, 2008	Mount Lemmon	Mount Lemmon Survey	·	560 m	MPC · JPL
822314	2015 RO_{25}	—	September 6, 2015	XuYi	PMO NEO Survey Program	·	2.2 km	MPC · JPL
822315	2015 RS_{29}	—	September 9, 2008	Mount Lemmon	Mount Lemmon Survey	·	550 m	MPC · JPL
822316	2015 RK_{31}	—	July 25, 2015	Haleakala	Pan-STARRS 1	PHO	580 m	MPC · JPL
822317	2015 RT_{33}	—	September 9, 2015	Haleakala	Pan-STARRS 1	·	1.8 km	MPC · JPL
822318	2015 RN_{36}	—	September 11, 2015	Haleakala	Pan-STARRS 1	BAR	1.1 km	MPC · JPL
822319	2015 RR_{37}	—	April 17, 2013	Cerro Tololo-DECam	DECam	·	2.4 km	MPC · JPL
822320	2015 RJ_{42}	—	November 2, 2011	Mount Lemmon	Mount Lemmon Survey	·	1.2 km	MPC · JPL
822321	2015 RZ_{42}	—	August 17, 2006	Palomar	NEAT	·	1.2 km	MPC · JPL
822322	2015 RK_{45}	—	July 26, 2011	Haleakala	Pan-STARRS 1	·	1.0 km	MPC · JPL
822323	2015 RD_{50}	—	January 21, 2012	Kitt Peak	Spacewatch	·	1.3 km	MPC · JPL
822324	2015 RT_{54}	—	September 10, 2015	Haleakala	Pan-STARRS 1	·	2.4 km	MPC · JPL
822325	2015 RP_{56}	—	August 13, 2010	Kitt Peak	Spacewatch	·	1.3 km	MPC · JPL
822326	2015 RX_{58}	—	October 5, 2004	Kitt Peak	Spacewatch	·	2.0 km	MPC · JPL
822327	2015 RH_{61}	—	September 10, 2004	Kitt Peak	Spacewatch	THM	1.5 km	MPC · JPL
822328	2015 RN_{62}	—	September 21, 2011	Haleakala	Pan-STARRS 1	·	630 m	MPC · JPL
822329	2015 RY_{62}	—	July 23, 2015	Haleakala	Pan-STARRS 1	·	1.0 km	MPC · JPL
822330	2015 RP_{67}	—	February 27, 2014	Haleakala	Pan-STARRS 1	·	1.0 km	MPC · JPL
822331	2015 RC_{72}	—	November 21, 2008	Kitt Peak	Spacewatch	·	790 m	MPC · JPL
822332	2015 RT_{74}	—	March 27, 2014	Haleakala	Pan-STARRS 1	·	1.3 km	MPC · JPL
822333	2015 RO_{76}	—	September 22, 2008	Mount Lemmon	Mount Lemmon Survey	·	550 m	MPC · JPL
822334	2015 RQ_{77}	—	April 23, 2014	Haleakala	Pan-STARRS 1	·	950 m	MPC · JPL
822335	2015 RU_{78}	—	September 20, 2008	Mount Lemmon	Mount Lemmon Survey	(2076)	460 m	MPC · JPL
822336	2015 RJ_{80}	—	September 10, 2015	Haleakala	Pan-STARRS 1	KOR	960 m	MPC · JPL
822337	2015 RH_{81}	—	October 9, 2004	Tucson	R. A. Tucker	·	1.7 km	MPC · JPL
822338	2015 RH_{82}	—	September 12, 2015	Haleakala	Pan-STARRS 1	H	370 m	MPC · JPL
822339	2015 RP_{88}	—	June 22, 2015	Haleakala	Pan-STARRS 1	PHO	900 m	MPC · JPL
822340	2015 RO_{90}	—	October 9, 2004	Kitt Peak	Spacewatch	·	2.2 km	MPC · JPL
822341	2015 RL_{91}	—	August 9, 2015	Piszkés-tető	K. Sárneczky, Á. Sódor	·	550 m	MPC · JPL
822342	2015 RP_{95}	—	September 23, 2011	Haleakala	Pan-STARRS 1	(5)	1 km	MPC · JPL
822343	2015 RC_{96}	—	August 10, 2001	Palomar	NEAT	·	490 m	MPC · JPL
822344	2015 RG_{96}	—	August 31, 2005	Kitt Peak	Spacewatch	·	520 m	MPC · JPL
822345	2015 RY_{99}	—	July 25, 2015	Haleakala	Pan-STARRS 1	PHO	580 m	MPC · JPL
822346	2015 RP_{107}	—	September 6, 2015	Haleakala	Pan-STARRS 1	·	1.3 km	MPC · JPL
822347	2015 RN_{126}	—	March 8, 2014	Mount Lemmon	Mount Lemmon Survey	·	870 m	MPC · JPL
822348	2015 RU_{136}	—	September 14, 2007	Kitt Peak	Spacewatch	·	750 m	MPC · JPL
822349	2015 RE_{144}	—	October 5, 2005	Mount Lemmon	Mount Lemmon Survey	·	1.9 km	MPC · JPL
822350	2015 RA_{156}	—	August 20, 2015	Kitt Peak	Spacewatch	·	860 m	MPC · JPL
822351	2015 RO_{158}	—	September 9, 2015	Haleakala	Pan-STARRS 1	·	620 m	MPC · JPL
822352	2015 RL_{164}	—	August 21, 2015	Haleakala	Pan-STARRS 1	·	1.9 km	MPC · JPL
822353	2015 RD_{165}	—	September 9, 2015	Haleakala	Pan-STARRS 1	·	1.9 km	MPC · JPL
822354	2015 RX_{166}	—	March 28, 2014	Mount Lemmon	Mount Lemmon Survey	·	1.1 km	MPC · JPL
822355	2015 RR_{170}	—	December 29, 2011	Mount Lemmon	Mount Lemmon Survey	·	1.5 km	MPC · JPL
822356	2015 RY_{182}	—	September 9, 2015	Haleakala	Pan-STARRS 1	·	2.1 km	MPC · JPL
822357	2015 RM_{186}	—	September 9, 2015	Haleakala	Pan-STARRS 1	·	520 m	MPC · JPL
822358	2015 RQ_{187}	—	September 10, 2015	Haleakala	Pan-STARRS 1	·	1.8 km	MPC · JPL
822359	2015 RQ_{193}	—	June 26, 2015	Haleakala	Pan-STARRS 1	·	570 m	MPC · JPL
822360	2015 RP_{194}	—	April 22, 2007	Kitt Peak	Spacewatch	MAS	550 m	MPC · JPL
822361	2015 RH_{198}	—	November 13, 2010	Mount Lemmon	Mount Lemmon Survey	HYG	1.8 km	MPC · JPL
822362	2015 RU_{199}	—	May 11, 2007	Mount Lemmon	Mount Lemmon Survey	NYS	850 m	MPC · JPL
822363	2015 RT_{200}	—	October 6, 2004	Kitt Peak	Spacewatch	·	1.1 km	MPC · JPL
822364	2015 RN_{201}	—	May 22, 2011	Mount Lemmon	Mount Lemmon Survey	·	540 m	MPC · JPL
822365	2015 RC_{202}	—	August 12, 2015	Haleakala	Pan-STARRS 1	·	590 m	MPC · JPL
822366	2015 RE_{204}	—	August 12, 2015	Haleakala	Pan-STARRS 1	V	420 m	MPC · JPL
822367	2015 RH_{204}	—	September 11, 2015	Haleakala	Pan-STARRS 1	·	600 m	MPC · JPL
822368	2015 RM_{206}	—	June 5, 2011	Mount Lemmon	Mount Lemmon Survey	(2076)	560 m	MPC · JPL
822369	2015 RW_{206}	—	September 11, 2015	Haleakala	Pan-STARRS 1	·	2.1 km	MPC · JPL
822370	2015 RQ_{208}	—	March 10, 2007	Mount Lemmon	Mount Lemmon Survey	·	720 m	MPC · JPL
822371	2015 RT_{210}	—	October 31, 2010	Mount Lemmon	Mount Lemmon Survey	·	1.3 km	MPC · JPL
822372	2015 RH_{211}	—	June 18, 2015	Haleakala	Pan-STARRS 1	·	460 m	MPC · JPL
822373	2015 RD_{220}	—	July 30, 2015	Haleakala	Pan-STARRS 1	·	1.4 km	MPC · JPL
822374	2015 RA_{222}	—	December 6, 2012	Mount Lemmon	Mount Lemmon Survey	·	510 m	MPC · JPL
822375	2015 RZ_{225}	—	September 11, 2015	Haleakala	Pan-STARRS 1	·	410 m	MPC · JPL
822376	2015 RA_{228}	—	June 26, 2015	Haleakala	Pan-STARRS 1	·	500 m	MPC · JPL
822377	2015 RU_{228}	—	September 1, 2005	Kitt Peak	Spacewatch	KOR	1.1 km	MPC · JPL
822378	2015 RW_{231}	—	September 29, 2010	Mount Lemmon	Mount Lemmon Survey	·	1.5 km	MPC · JPL
822379	2015 RE_{233}	—	September 27, 2006	Kitt Peak	Spacewatch	·	1.3 km	MPC · JPL
822380	2015 RS_{233}	—	September 11, 2015	Haleakala	Pan-STARRS 1	·	1.6 km	MPC · JPL
822381	2015 RE_{234}	—	May 7, 2014	Haleakala	Pan-STARRS 1	·	1.4 km	MPC · JPL
822382	2015 RU_{234}	—	September 11, 2015	Haleakala	Pan-STARRS 1	·	2.2 km	MPC · JPL
822383	2015 RK_{236}	—	January 14, 2011	Mount Lemmon	Mount Lemmon Survey	·	2.0 km	MPC · JPL
822384	2015 RE_{237}	—	August 3, 2014	Haleakala	Pan-STARRS 1	EOS	1.4 km	MPC · JPL
822385	2015 RB_{239}	—	September 11, 2015	Haleakala	Pan-STARRS 1	·	840 m	MPC · JPL
822386	2015 RY_{239}	—	August 12, 2015	Haleakala	Pan-STARRS 1	·	1.9 km	MPC · JPL
822387	2015 RQ_{241}	—	September 11, 2015	Haleakala	Pan-STARRS 1	·	1.9 km	MPC · JPL
822388	2015 RP_{245}	—	September 9, 2015	Haleakala	Pan-STARRS 1	·	1.0 km	MPC · JPL
822389	2015 RO_{246}	—	September 6, 2015	Haleakala	Pan-STARRS 1	H	350 m	MPC · JPL
822390	2015 RQ_{246}	—	September 9, 2015	Haleakala	Pan-STARRS 1	H	340 m	MPC · JPL
822391	2015 RD_{247}	—	September 12, 2015	Haleakala	Pan-STARRS 1	H	350 m	MPC · JPL
822392	2015 RK_{247}	—	April 9, 2014	Haleakala	Pan-STARRS 1	H	360 m	MPC · JPL
822393	2015 RU_{248}	—	September 9, 2015	Haleakala	Pan-STARRS 1	·	1.9 km	MPC · JPL
822394	2015 RK_{249}	—	October 5, 2004	Vail	Observatory, Jarnac	·	1.9 km	MPC · JPL
822395	2015 RS_{251}	—	October 4, 2004	Kitt Peak	Spacewatch	·	2.2 km	MPC · JPL
822396	2015 RR_{256}	—	March 27, 2008	Mount Lemmon	Mount Lemmon Survey	·	2.0 km	MPC · JPL
822397	2015 RA_{263}	—	April 11, 2008	Kitt Peak	Spacewatch	·	2.1 km	MPC · JPL
822398	2015 RC_{264}	—	May 21, 2014	Haleakala	Pan-STARRS 1	THM	1.6 km	MPC · JPL
822399	2015 RZ_{264}	—	April 11, 2008	Mount Lemmon	Mount Lemmon Survey	·	2.0 km	MPC · JPL
822400	2015 RF_{265}	—	September 9, 2015	Haleakala	Pan-STARRS 1	·	950 m	MPC · JPL

== 822401–822500 ==
back to top

Designation			Discovery			Properties		Ref
Permanent	Provisional	Named after	Date	Site	Discoverer(s)	Category	Diam.	Ref
822401	2015 RM_{265}	—	October 25, 2008	Kitt Peak	Spacewatch	·	670 m	MPC · JPL
822402	2015 RL_{266}	—	May 7, 2014	Haleakala	Pan-STARRS 1	·	970 m	MPC · JPL
822403	2015 RB_{267}	—	September 9, 2015	Haleakala	Pan-STARRS 1	·	880 m	MPC · JPL
822404	2015 RS_{267}	—	September 9, 2015	Haleakala	Pan-STARRS 1	·	2.4 km	MPC · JPL
822405	2015 RB_{268}	—	September 4, 2014	Haleakala	Pan-STARRS 1	·	2.7 km	MPC · JPL
822406	2015 RY_{269}	—	August 24, 2007	Kitt Peak	Spacewatch	·	900 m	MPC · JPL
822407	2015 RY_{272}	—	May 8, 2014	Haleakala	Pan-STARRS 1	·	1.2 km	MPC · JPL
822408	2015 RQ_{273}	—	September 28, 2006	Kitt Peak	Spacewatch	·	1.2 km	MPC · JPL
822409	2015 RV_{274}	—	May 8, 2014	Haleakala	Pan-STARRS 1	·	960 m	MPC · JPL
822410	2015 RJ_{282}	—	September 9, 2015	Haleakala	Pan-STARRS 1	·	830 m	MPC · JPL
822411	2015 RK_{283}	—	September 12, 2015	Haleakala	Pan-STARRS 1	H	420 m	MPC · JPL
822412	2015 RG_{285}	—	September 9, 2015	Haleakala	Pan-STARRS 1	MAS	590 m	MPC · JPL
822413	2015 RC_{287}	—	September 6, 2015	Haleakala	Pan-STARRS 1	·	730 m	MPC · JPL
822414	2015 RL_{290}	—	September 9, 2015	Haleakala	Pan-STARRS 1	·	940 m	MPC · JPL
822415	2015 RK_{291}	—	September 9, 2015	Haleakala	Pan-STARRS 1	·	540 m	MPC · JPL
822416	2015 RN_{291}	—	September 7, 2015	Catalina	CSS	H	370 m	MPC · JPL
822417	2015 RE_{292}	—	September 8, 2015	Haleakala	Pan-STARRS 1	·	880 m	MPC · JPL
822418	2015 RW_{293}	—	September 9, 2015	Haleakala	Pan-STARRS 1	LUT	2.6 km	MPC · JPL
822419	2015 RC_{300}	—	March 21, 2002	Kitt Peak	Spacewatch	·	2.2 km	MPC · JPL
822420	2015 RJ_{301}	—	September 4, 2015	Kitt Peak	Spacewatch	·	950 m	MPC · JPL
822421	2015 RU_{304}	—	September 11, 2015	Haleakala	Pan-STARRS 1	·	1.7 km	MPC · JPL
822422	2015 RX_{307}	—	September 12, 2015	Haleakala	Pan-STARRS 1	·	1.4 km	MPC · JPL
822423	2015 RN_{309}	—	September 10, 2015	Haleakala	Pan-STARRS 1	·	2.2 km	MPC · JPL
822424	2015 RN_{310}	—	September 9, 2015	Haleakala	Pan-STARRS 1	·	2.2 km	MPC · JPL
822425	2015 RM_{311}	—	September 9, 2015	Haleakala	Pan-STARRS 1	·	700 m	MPC · JPL
822426	2015 RQ_{311}	—	September 6, 2015	Haleakala	Pan-STARRS 1	·	2.3 km	MPC · JPL
822427	2015 RT_{313}	—	September 9, 2015	Haleakala	Pan-STARRS 1	·	2.3 km	MPC · JPL
822428	2015 RN_{315}	—	September 9, 2015	XuYi	PMO NEO Survey Program	·	1.6 km	MPC · JPL
822429	2015 RH_{317}	—	September 12, 2015	Haleakala	Pan-STARRS 1	·	1.6 km	MPC · JPL
822430	2015 RA_{318}	—	October 14, 2010	Mount Lemmon	Mount Lemmon Survey	·	1.5 km	MPC · JPL
822431	2015 RS_{319}	—	September 10, 2015	Haleakala	Pan-STARRS 1	·	830 m	MPC · JPL
822432	2015 RW_{323}	—	September 12, 2015	Haleakala	Pan-STARRS 1	·	2.2 km	MPC · JPL
822433	2015 RX_{323}	—	September 8, 2015	Haleakala	Pan-STARRS 1	·	590 m	MPC · JPL
822434	2015 RD_{332}	—	September 11, 2015	Haleakala	Pan-STARRS 1	·	510 m	MPC · JPL
822435	2015 RH_{332}	—	September 12, 2015	Haleakala	Pan-STARRS 1	·	690 m	MPC · JPL
822436	2015 RQ_{342}	—	September 5, 2015	Haleakala	Pan-STARRS 1	V	460 m	MPC · JPL
822437	2015 RR_{359}	—	September 12, 2015	Haleakala	Pan-STARRS 1	H	390 m	MPC · JPL
822438	2015 RH_{362}	—	September 12, 2015	Haleakala	Pan-STARRS 1	·	660 m	MPC · JPL
822439	2015 RR_{363}	—	September 12, 2015	Haleakala	Pan-STARRS 1	·	1.4 km	MPC · JPL
822440	2015 RK_{369}	—	September 8, 2015	Haleakala	Pan-STARRS 1	·	580 m	MPC · JPL
822441	2015 RR_{372}	—	November 9, 2008	Kitt Peak	Spacewatch	·	490 m	MPC · JPL
822442	2015 RR_{374}	—	September 12, 2015	Haleakala	Pan-STARRS 1	·	1.7 km	MPC · JPL
822443	2015 RS_{378}	—	October 9, 2010	Mount Lemmon	Mount Lemmon Survey	·	1.7 km	MPC · JPL
822444	2015 SJ	—	September 29, 2008	Catalina	CSS	·	1.0 km	MPC · JPL
822445	2015 SM_{3}	—	December 6, 2012	Mount Lemmon	Mount Lemmon Survey	·	630 m	MPC · JPL
822446	2015 SB_{7}	—	September 6, 2015	Haleakala	Pan-STARRS 1	H	450 m	MPC · JPL
822447	2015 SU_{7}	—	August 28, 2015	Haleakala	Pan-STARRS 1	·	1.9 km	MPC · JPL
822448	2015 SS_{9}	—	September 22, 2015	Haleakala	Pan-STARRS 1	·	2.0 km	MPC · JPL
822449	2015 SU_{21}	—	September 23, 2015	Haleakala	Pan-STARRS 1	H	370 m	MPC · JPL
822450	2015 SM_{22}	—	September 16, 2009	Catalina	CSS	·	2.0 km	MPC · JPL
822451	2015 ST_{22}	—	September 23, 2015	Haleakala	Pan-STARRS 1	·	2.0 km	MPC · JPL
822452	2015 SV_{24}	—	February 28, 2008	Mount Lemmon	Mount Lemmon Survey	EUN	900 m	MPC · JPL
822453	2015 SD_{26}	—	April 4, 2014	Haleakala	Pan-STARRS 1	MAS	610 m	MPC · JPL
822454	2015 SE_{28}	—	April 11, 2013	Mount Lemmon	Mount Lemmon Survey	EOS	1.4 km	MPC · JPL
822455	2015 SJ_{28}	—	August 22, 2014	Haleakala	Pan-STARRS 1	VER	2.2 km	MPC · JPL
822456	2015 SF_{31}	—	September 19, 2015	Haleakala	Pan-STARRS 1	·	1.4 km	MPC · JPL
822457	2015 SK_{32}	—	September 23, 2015	Haleakala	Pan-STARRS 1	·	950 m	MPC · JPL
822458	2015 SW_{34}	—	September 23, 2015	Haleakala	Pan-STARRS 1	·	590 m	MPC · JPL
822459	2015 SW_{35}	—	September 23, 2015	Mount Lemmon	Mount Lemmon Survey	·	780 m	MPC · JPL
822460	2015 SK_{36}	—	September 23, 2015	Haleakala	Pan-STARRS 1	·	2.8 km	MPC · JPL
822461	2015 SM_{38}	—	September 23, 2015	Haleakala	Pan-STARRS 1	·	850 m	MPC · JPL
822462	2015 SH_{40}	—	September 23, 2015	Haleakala	Pan-STARRS 1	·	2.1 km	MPC · JPL
822463	2015 SM_{40}	—	September 23, 2015	Haleakala	Pan-STARRS 1	·	2.6 km	MPC · JPL
822464	2015 SW_{41}	—	September 24, 2015	Mount Lemmon	Mount Lemmon Survey	·	2.3 km	MPC · JPL
822465	2015 SV_{43}	—	September 24, 2015	Mount Lemmon	Mount Lemmon Survey	·	1.8 km	MPC · JPL
822466	2015 SN_{44}	—	September 23, 2015	Haleakala	Pan-STARRS 1	·	900 m	MPC · JPL
822467	2015 SR_{48}	—	September 23, 2015	Haleakala	Pan-STARRS 1	·	2.4 km	MPC · JPL
822468	2015 SE_{51}	—	September 23, 2015	Haleakala	Pan-STARRS 1	·	2.3 km	MPC · JPL
822469	2015 SK_{51}	—	September 23, 2015	Mount Lemmon	Mount Lemmon Survey	·	2.0 km	MPC · JPL
822470	2015 SR_{52}	—	September 23, 2015	Haleakala	Pan-STARRS 1	LIX	2.4 km	MPC · JPL
822471	2015 SQ_{53}	—	September 18, 2015	Mount Lemmon	Mount Lemmon Survey	·	690 m	MPC · JPL
822472	2015 SA_{55}	—	September 20, 2015	Westfield	International Astronomical Search Collaboration	·	660 m	MPC · JPL
822473	2015 SD_{60}	—	July 13, 2009	Kitt Peak	Spacewatch	T_{j} (2.95)	2.9 km	MPC · JPL
822474	2015 TQ	—	October 1, 2005	Kitt Peak	Spacewatch	·	360 m	MPC · JPL
822475	2015 TU_{3}	—	July 24, 2015	Haleakala	Pan-STARRS 1	·	690 m	MPC · JPL
822476	2015 TC_{4}	—	July 14, 2015	Haleakala	Pan-STARRS 1	NYS	950 m	MPC · JPL
822477	2015 TM_{4}	—	September 5, 2015	Haleakala	Pan-STARRS 1	MAR	640 m	MPC · JPL
822478	2015 TD_{6}	—	October 6, 2008	Kitt Peak	Spacewatch	·	940 m	MPC · JPL
822479	2015 TZ_{8}	—	September 1, 2010	Mount Lemmon	Mount Lemmon Survey	·	1.9 km	MPC · JPL
822480	2015 TE_{9}	—	August 10, 2015	Haleakala	Pan-STARRS 1	·	2.5 km	MPC · JPL
822481	2015 TQ_{12}	—	June 25, 2015	Haleakala	Pan-STARRS 1	T_{j} (2.99)	2.0 km	MPC · JPL
822482	2015 TH_{14}	—	January 31, 2006	Kitt Peak	Spacewatch	·	2.6 km	MPC · JPL
822483	2015 TL_{14}	—	May 7, 2014	Haleakala	Pan-STARRS 1	·	2.0 km	MPC · JPL
822484	2015 TF_{17}	—	May 23, 2014	Haleakala	Pan-STARRS 1	·	2.1 km	MPC · JPL
822485	2015 TE_{18}	—	October 2, 2015	Haleakala	Pan-STARRS 1	·	1.9 km	MPC · JPL
822486	2015 TF_{18}	—	October 2, 2015	Haleakala	Pan-STARRS 1	PHO	640 m	MPC · JPL
822487	2015 TQ_{18}	—	October 4, 2002	Campo Imperatore	CINEOS	·	1.3 km	MPC · JPL
822488	2015 TD_{22}	—	October 23, 2012	Kitt Peak	Spacewatch	·	550 m	MPC · JPL
822489	2015 TC_{23}	—	August 23, 2011	Haleakala	Pan-STARRS 1	NYS	1.0 km	MPC · JPL
822490	2015 TA_{26}	—	September 5, 2015	Haleakala	Pan-STARRS 1	·	650 m	MPC · JPL
822491	2015 TV_{31}	—	May 14, 2008	Kitt Peak	Spacewatch	·	560 m	MPC · JPL
822492	2015 TE_{32}	—	October 5, 2015	Haleakala	Pan-STARRS 1	PHO	660 m	MPC · JPL
822493	2015 TP_{32}	—	August 14, 2015	Haleakala	Pan-STARRS 1	·	1.7 km	MPC · JPL
822494	2015 TK_{33}	—	September 6, 2015	Haleakala	Pan-STARRS 1	PHO	720 m	MPC · JPL
822495	2015 TA_{36}	—	October 8, 2015	Haleakala	Pan-STARRS 1	EOS	1.3 km	MPC · JPL
822496	2015 TH_{38}	—	July 19, 2015	Haleakala	Pan-STARRS 1	·	790 m	MPC · JPL
822497	2015 TG_{39}	—	October 21, 2006	Catalina	CSS	·	1.8 km	MPC · JPL
822498	2015 TV_{39}	—	November 12, 2010	Mount Lemmon	Mount Lemmon Survey	·	2.3 km	MPC · JPL
822499	2015 TA_{41}	—	July 19, 2015	Haleakala	Pan-STARRS 1	·	690 m	MPC · JPL
822500	2015 TE_{43}	—	November 30, 2010	Mount Lemmon	Mount Lemmon Survey	·	2.2 km	MPC · JPL

== 822501–822600 ==
back to top

Designation			Discovery			Properties		Ref
Permanent	Provisional	Named after	Date	Site	Discoverer(s)	Category	Diam.	Ref
822501	2015 TM_{45}	—	September 6, 2015	Haleakala	Pan-STARRS 1	H	350 m	MPC · JPL
822502	2015 TV_{53}	—	February 10, 2014	Haleakala	Pan-STARRS 1	·	740 m	MPC · JPL
822503	2015 TC_{58}	—	September 10, 2015	Haleakala	Pan-STARRS 1	·	870 m	MPC · JPL
822504	2015 TJ_{58}	—	May 6, 2014	Haleakala	Pan-STARRS 1	·	820 m	MPC · JPL
822505	2015 TE_{63}	—	October 31, 2006	Mount Lemmon	Mount Lemmon Survey	HOF	2.1 km	MPC · JPL
822506	2015 TB_{65}	—	October 8, 2015	Haleakala	Pan-STARRS 1	·	1.5 km	MPC · JPL
822507	2015 TX_{67}	—	August 25, 2014	Haleakala	Pan-STARRS 1	·	2.8 km	MPC · JPL
822508	2015 TO_{71}	—	October 8, 2015	Haleakala	Pan-STARRS 1	H	330 m	MPC · JPL
822509	2015 TM_{73}	—	September 27, 2011	Mount Lemmon	Mount Lemmon Survey	·	870 m	MPC · JPL
822510	2015 TN_{74}	—	November 3, 2010	Kitt Peak	Spacewatch	·	1.8 km	MPC · JPL
822511	2015 TC_{75}	—	October 8, 2015	Haleakala	Pan-STARRS 1	·	770 m	MPC · JPL
822512	2015 TY_{76}	—	July 26, 2011	Haleakala	Pan-STARRS 1	·	690 m	MPC · JPL
822513	2015 TS_{77}	—	November 12, 2001	Socorro	LINEAR	·	560 m	MPC · JPL
822514	2015 TY_{77}	—	September 16, 2009	Kitt Peak	Spacewatch	·	2.0 km	MPC · JPL
822515	2015 TB_{79}	—	October 1, 2010	Mount Lemmon	Mount Lemmon Survey	·	1.5 km	MPC · JPL
822516	2015 TC_{84}	—	October 11, 2004	Kitt Peak	Spacewatch	THM	2.1 km	MPC · JPL
822517	2015 TP_{84}	—	September 9, 2015	Haleakala	Pan-STARRS 1	·	1.1 km	MPC · JPL
822518	2015 TU_{84}	—	October 8, 2015	Haleakala	Pan-STARRS 1	·	1.2 km	MPC · JPL
822519	2015 TV_{85}	—	October 8, 2015	Haleakala	Pan-STARRS 1	·	1.6 km	MPC · JPL
822520	2015 TA_{87}	—	November 17, 2008	Kitt Peak	Spacewatch	·	730 m	MPC · JPL
822521	2015 TJ_{87}	—	April 5, 2014	Haleakala	Pan-STARRS 1	MAS	570 m	MPC · JPL
822522	2015 TC_{88}	—	September 9, 2015	Haleakala	Pan-STARRS 1	·	1.1 km	MPC · JPL
822523	2015 TO_{89}	—	September 9, 2015	Haleakala	Pan-STARRS 1	·	2.3 km	MPC · JPL
822524	2015 TM_{90}	—	August 20, 2011	Haleakala	Pan-STARRS 1	MAS	540 m	MPC · JPL
822525	2015 TY_{91}	—	October 24, 2009	Kitt Peak	Spacewatch	·	2.4 km	MPC · JPL
822526	2015 TH_{92}	—	September 9, 2015	Haleakala	Pan-STARRS 1	·	570 m	MPC · JPL
822527	2015 TF_{93}	—	October 8, 2015	Haleakala	Pan-STARRS 1	·	2.0 km	MPC · JPL
822528	2015 TX_{93}	—	October 8, 2015	Haleakala	Pan-STARRS 1	·	990 m	MPC · JPL
822529	2015 TQ_{98}	—	September 9, 2015	Haleakala	Pan-STARRS 1	·	2.5 km	MPC · JPL
822530	2015 TM_{101}	—	July 25, 2014	Haleakala	Pan-STARRS 1	·	1.9 km	MPC · JPL
822531	2015 TY_{107}	—	October 8, 2015	Haleakala	Pan-STARRS 1	·	710 m	MPC · JPL
822532	2015 TK_{113}	—	September 23, 2009	Mount Lemmon	Mount Lemmon Survey	·	2.1 km	MPC · JPL
822533	2015 TH_{114}	—	October 8, 2015	Haleakala	Pan-STARRS 1	PHO	560 m	MPC · JPL
822534	2015 TO_{114}	—	November 7, 2008	Mount Lemmon	Mount Lemmon Survey	·	630 m	MPC · JPL
822535	2015 TX_{116}	—	May 23, 2014	Haleakala	Pan-STARRS 1	·	980 m	MPC · JPL
822536	2015 TB_{119}	—	August 28, 2012	Mount Lemmon	Mount Lemmon Survey	H	330 m	MPC · JPL
822537	2015 TU_{120}	—	January 29, 2011	Mayhill-ISON	L. Elenin	·	2.4 km	MPC · JPL
822538	2015 TO_{121}	—	June 17, 2014	Mount Lemmon	Mount Lemmon Survey	H	470 m	MPC · JPL
822539	2015 TA_{124}	—	October 8, 2015	Haleakala	Pan-STARRS 1	·	1.9 km	MPC · JPL
822540	2015 TM_{124}	—	October 8, 2015	Haleakala	Pan-STARRS 1	H	360 m	MPC · JPL
822541	2015 TP_{129}	—	January 21, 2012	Kitt Peak	Spacewatch	GEF	850 m	MPC · JPL
822542	2015 TH_{130}	—	March 29, 2014	Mount Lemmon	Mount Lemmon Survey	H	410 m	MPC · JPL
822543	2015 TF_{132}	—	October 8, 2015	Haleakala	Pan-STARRS 1	·	920 m	MPC · JPL
822544	2015 TD_{133}	—	July 30, 2014	Haleakala	Pan-STARRS 1	·	2.4 km	MPC · JPL
822545	2015 TJ_{134}	—	September 11, 2015	Haleakala	Pan-STARRS 1	(22805)	2.5 km	MPC · JPL
822546	2015 TD_{135}	—	August 12, 2015	Haleakala	Pan-STARRS 1	·	990 m	MPC · JPL
822547	2015 TZ_{137}	—	June 30, 2014	Haleakala	Pan-STARRS 1	·	2.0 km	MPC · JPL
822548	2015 TX_{141}	—	July 8, 2014	Haleakala	Pan-STARRS 1	EOS	1.5 km	MPC · JPL
822549	2015 TH_{146}	—	August 28, 2015	Haleakala	Pan-STARRS 1	NYS	790 m	MPC · JPL
822550	2015 TW_{146}	—	March 31, 2009	Kitt Peak	Spacewatch	H	410 m	MPC · JPL
822551	2015 TK_{150}	—	September 11, 2015	Haleakala	Pan-STARRS 1	·	1.9 km	MPC · JPL
822552	2015 TN_{150}	—	August 22, 2004	Kitt Peak	Spacewatch	·	1.4 km	MPC · JPL
822553	2015 TL_{153}	—	March 16, 2007	Mount Lemmon	Mount Lemmon Survey	ERI	1.0 km	MPC · JPL
822554	2015 TZ_{153}	—	October 24, 2011	Haleakala	Pan-STARRS 1	·	1.2 km	MPC · JPL
822555	2015 TW_{154}	—	September 6, 2015	Haleakala	Pan-STARRS 1	·	2.1 km	MPC · JPL
822556	2015 TR_{156}	—	November 30, 1999	Kitt Peak	Spacewatch	·	480 m	MPC · JPL
822557	2015 TD_{159}	—	October 7, 2004	Kitt Peak	Spacewatch	·	2.0 km	MPC · JPL
822558	2015 TO_{159}	—	September 29, 2011	Kitt Peak	Spacewatch	·	850 m	MPC · JPL
822559	2015 TA_{163}	—	July 27, 2015	Haleakala	Pan-STARRS 1	·	2.2 km	MPC · JPL
822560	2015 TF_{164}	—	September 17, 2006	Kitt Peak	Spacewatch	·	1.5 km	MPC · JPL
822561	2015 TO_{166}	—	July 30, 2008	Mount Lemmon	Mount Lemmon Survey	·	510 m	MPC · JPL
822562	2015 TL_{168}	—	October 27, 2005	Mount Lemmon	Mount Lemmon Survey	·	540 m	MPC · JPL
822563	2015 TG_{172}	—	April 29, 2014	Haleakala	Pan-STARRS 1	·	900 m	MPC · JPL
822564	2015 TW_{177}	—	December 8, 2010	Mount Lemmon	Mount Lemmon Survey	H	400 m	MPC · JPL
822565	2015 TX_{177}	—	October 12, 2015	Mount Lemmon	Mount Lemmon Survey	H	440 m	MPC · JPL
822566	2015 TE_{187}	—	May 16, 2013	Mount Lemmon	Mount Lemmon Survey	·	2.6 km	MPC · JPL
822567	2015 TX_{190}	—	August 1, 2015	Haleakala	Pan-STARRS 1	TIR	2.2 km	MPC · JPL
822568	2015 TW_{191}	—	September 18, 2010	Mount Lemmon	Mount Lemmon Survey	·	1.7 km	MPC · JPL
822569	2015 TB_{192}	—	October 8, 2004	Kitt Peak	Spacewatch	MAS	630 m	MPC · JPL
822570	2015 TN_{194}	—	July 16, 2004	Cerro Tololo	Deep Ecliptic Survey	·	1.9 km	MPC · JPL
822571	2015 TS_{195}	—	October 10, 2015	Space Surveillance	Space Surveillance Telescope	PHO	740 m	MPC · JPL
822572	2015 TT_{196}	—	October 10, 2015	Space Surveillance	Space Surveillance Telescope	·	1.7 km	MPC · JPL
822573	2015 TA_{201}	—	August 12, 2015	Haleakala	Pan-STARRS 1	·	530 m	MPC · JPL
822574	2015 TU_{207}	—	November 2, 2010	Kitt Peak	Spacewatch	·	2.1 km	MPC · JPL
822575	2015 TO_{208}	—	July 25, 2015	Haleakala	Pan-STARRS 1	·	610 m	MPC · JPL
822576	2015 TY_{210}	—	September 11, 2015	Haleakala	Pan-STARRS 1	KOR	1.1 km	MPC · JPL
822577	2015 TE_{211}	—	November 1, 2010	Mount Lemmon	Mount Lemmon Survey	·	1.5 km	MPC · JPL
822578	2015 TF_{212}	—	September 6, 2015	Kitt Peak	Spacewatch	V	510 m	MPC · JPL
822579	2015 TN_{213}	—	October 28, 2005	Mount Lemmon	Mount Lemmon Survey	·	1.2 km	MPC · JPL
822580	2015 TY_{214}	—	September 6, 2008	Mount Lemmon	Mount Lemmon Survey	·	490 m	MPC · JPL
822581	2015 TH_{215}	—	November 1, 2010	Mount Lemmon	Mount Lemmon Survey	·	1.2 km	MPC · JPL
822582	2015 TM_{217}	—	October 7, 2004	Kitt Peak	Spacewatch	·	1.8 km	MPC · JPL
822583	2015 TY_{219}	—	September 18, 2015	Mount Lemmon	Mount Lemmon Survey	·	1.4 km	MPC · JPL
822584	2015 TK_{221}	—	October 8, 2008	Kitt Peak	Spacewatch	·	730 m	MPC · JPL
822585	2015 TL_{221}	—	October 5, 2004	Kitt Peak	Spacewatch	·	2.0 km	MPC · JPL
822586	2015 TM_{223}	—	July 23, 2015	Haleakala	Pan-STARRS 1	·	1.2 km	MPC · JPL
822587	2015 TS_{224}	—	October 8, 2015	Mount Lemmon	Mount Lemmon Survey	·	460 m	MPC · JPL
822588	2015 TS_{225}	—	October 10, 2015	Haleakala	Pan-STARRS 1	·	2.3 km	MPC · JPL
822589	2015 TK_{226}	—	August 9, 2004	Anderson Mesa	LONEOS	·	1.9 km	MPC · JPL
822590	2015 TC_{233}	—	October 29, 2010	Mount Lemmon	Mount Lemmon Survey	·	1.6 km	MPC · JPL
822591	2015 TX_{242}	—	September 9, 2008	Mount Lemmon	Mount Lemmon Survey	NYS	580 m	MPC · JPL
822592	2015 TC_{244}	—	August 27, 2009	Kitt Peak	Spacewatch	·	2.3 km	MPC · JPL
822593	2015 TN_{244}	—	April 12, 2005	Kitt Peak	Deep Ecliptic Survey	·	780 m	MPC · JPL
822594	2015 TN_{247}	—	April 30, 2014	Haleakala	Pan-STARRS 1	·	1.7 km	MPC · JPL
822595	2015 TR_{251}	—	April 4, 2014	Haleakala	Pan-STARRS 1	·	980 m	MPC · JPL
822596	2015 TF_{257}	—	September 7, 2004	Kitt Peak	Spacewatch	·	700 m	MPC · JPL
822597	2015 TQ_{258}	—	October 30, 2010	Mount Lemmon	Mount Lemmon Survey	EOS	1.6 km	MPC · JPL
822598	2015 TV_{260}	—	December 5, 2007	Kitt Peak	Spacewatch	HNS	890 m	MPC · JPL
822599	2015 TJ_{262}	—	October 12, 2015	Haleakala	Pan-STARRS 1	·	2.4 km	MPC · JPL
822600	2015 TR_{268}	—	October 12, 2015	Haleakala	Pan-STARRS 1	·	640 m	MPC · JPL

== 822601–822700 ==
back to top

Designation			Discovery			Properties		Ref
Permanent	Provisional	Named after	Date	Site	Discoverer(s)	Category	Diam.	Ref
822601	2015 TJ_{272}	—	October 12, 2015	Haleakala	Pan-STARRS 1	·	820 m	MPC · JPL
822602	2015 TM_{274}	—	February 26, 2014	Haleakala	Pan-STARRS 1	·	750 m	MPC · JPL
822603	2015 TR_{274}	—	September 12, 2015	Haleakala	Pan-STARRS 1	·	510 m	MPC · JPL
822604	2015 TL_{275}	—	July 28, 2011	Haleakala	Pan-STARRS 1	·	930 m	MPC · JPL
822605	2015 TD_{276}	—	September 12, 2015	Haleakala	Pan-STARRS 1	·	660 m	MPC · JPL
822606	2015 TK_{278}	—	October 9, 2015	XuYi	PMO NEO Survey Program	PHO	780 m	MPC · JPL
822607	2015 TN_{281}	—	June 26, 2011	Mount Lemmon	Mount Lemmon Survey	·	870 m	MPC · JPL
822608	2015 TM_{284}	—	October 29, 2005	Kitt Peak	Spacewatch	·	490 m	MPC · JPL
822609	2015 TR_{284}	—	May 28, 2014	Haleakala	Pan-STARRS 1	·	1.4 km	MPC · JPL
822610	2015 TE_{288}	—	October 30, 2008	Mount Lemmon	Mount Lemmon Survey	·	650 m	MPC · JPL
822611	2015 TX_{288}	—	September 7, 2008	Mount Lemmon	Mount Lemmon Survey	·	550 m	MPC · JPL
822612	2015 TY_{288}	—	October 12, 2007	Kitt Peak	Spacewatch	·	650 m	MPC · JPL
822613	2015 TJ_{292}	—	October 3, 2008	Mount Lemmon	Mount Lemmon Survey	·	420 m	MPC · JPL
822614	2015 TC_{295}	—	October 13, 2010	Mount Lemmon	Mount Lemmon Survey	·	1.9 km	MPC · JPL
822615	2015 TG_{297}	—	April 5, 2014	Haleakala	Pan-STARRS 1	·	970 m	MPC · JPL
822616	2015 TT_{297}	—	September 11, 2004	Kitt Peak	Spacewatch	·	740 m	MPC · JPL
822617	2015 TK_{300}	—	June 4, 2011	Mount Lemmon	Mount Lemmon Survey	·	610 m	MPC · JPL
822618	2015 TZ_{303}	—	October 17, 1998	Kitt Peak	Spacewatch	·	500 m	MPC · JPL
822619	2015 TZ_{304}	—	September 23, 2015	Haleakala	Pan-STARRS 1	·	2.4 km	MPC · JPL
822620	2015 TC_{308}	—	October 10, 2015	Haleakala	Pan-STARRS 1	HNS	780 m	MPC · JPL
822621	2015 TY_{311}	—	December 16, 2011	Haleakala	Pan-STARRS 1	·	1.0 km	MPC · JPL
822622	2015 TR_{313}	—	September 12, 2015	Haleakala	Pan-STARRS 1	·	790 m	MPC · JPL
822623	2015 TM_{315}	—	August 20, 2006	Palomar	NEAT	·	1.5 km	MPC · JPL
822624	2015 TX_{319}	—	May 8, 2014	Haleakala	Pan-STARRS 1	·	870 m	MPC · JPL
822625	2015 TZ_{324}	—	May 30, 2014	Haleakala	Pan-STARRS 1	·	2.2 km	MPC · JPL
822626	2015 TZ_{325}	—	August 21, 2015	Haleakala	Pan-STARRS 1	·	580 m	MPC · JPL
822627	2015 TQ_{332}	—	August 21, 2015	Haleakala	Pan-STARRS 1	·	580 m	MPC · JPL
822628	2015 TM_{336}	—	October 3, 1999	Catalina	CSS	·	2.0 km	MPC · JPL
822629	2015 TA_{343}	—	August 9, 2015	Haleakala	Pan-STARRS 1	·	1.9 km	MPC · JPL
822630	2015 TE_{347}	—	October 31, 2010	Mount Lemmon	Mount Lemmon Survey	·	1.1 km	MPC · JPL
822631	2015 TM_{351}	—	May 11, 2014	Mount Lemmon	Mount Lemmon Survey	H	390 m	MPC · JPL
822632	2015 TP_{351}	—	October 10, 2015	Haleakala	Pan-STARRS 1	H	380 m	MPC · JPL
822633	2015 TS_{352}	—	October 10, 2015	Haleakala	Pan-STARRS 1	H	380 m	MPC · JPL
822634	2015 TU_{352}	—	October 11, 2015	XuYi	PMO NEO Survey Program	H	340 m	MPC · JPL
822635	2015 TY_{352}	—	October 25, 2007	Mount Lemmon	Mount Lemmon Survey	H	380 m	MPC · JPL
822636	2015 TF_{357}	—	October 10, 2015	Haleakala	Pan-STARRS 1	·	2.7 km	MPC · JPL
822637	2015 TB_{359}	—	December 1, 2005	Mount Lemmon	Mount Lemmon Survey	·	1.9 km	MPC · JPL
822638	2015 TA_{365}	—	October 12, 2015	Haleakala	Pan-STARRS 1	·	650 m	MPC · JPL
822639	2015 TB_{365}	—	October 9, 2007	Mount Lemmon	Mount Lemmon Survey	MAR	580 m	MPC · JPL
822640	2015 TD_{367}	—	November 23, 2008	Mount Lemmon	Mount Lemmon Survey	PHO	770 m	MPC · JPL
822641	2015 TV_{367}	—	October 9, 2015	Haleakala	Pan-STARRS 1	·	970 m	MPC · JPL
822642	2015 TW_{368}	—	December 18, 2004	Mount Lemmon	Mount Lemmon Survey	MAS	610 m	MPC · JPL
822643	2015 TY_{372}	—	October 8, 2015	Haleakala	Pan-STARRS 1	·	1.3 km	MPC · JPL
822644	2015 TY_{373}	—	September 15, 2009	Kitt Peak	Spacewatch	·	1.9 km	MPC · JPL
822645	2015 TX_{375}	—	October 9, 2015	Haleakala	Pan-STARRS 1	·	1.3 km	MPC · JPL
822646	2015 TL_{378}	—	August 15, 2004	Cerro Tololo	Deep Ecliptic Survey	·	1.5 km	MPC · JPL
822647	2015 TM_{382}	—	October 10, 2015	Haleakala	Pan-STARRS 1	·	1.5 km	MPC · JPL
822648	2015 TE_{383}	—	October 11, 2010	Kitt Peak	Spacewatch	615	1.2 km	MPC · JPL
822649	2015 TG_{383}	—	November 10, 2010	Mount Lemmon	Mount Lemmon Survey	EOS	1.6 km	MPC · JPL
822650	2015 TA_{385}	—	June 24, 2014	Haleakala	Pan-STARRS 1	·	2.2 km	MPC · JPL
822651	2015 TN_{386}	—	October 8, 2015	Mount Lemmon	Mount Lemmon Survey	·	520 m	MPC · JPL
822652	2015 TJ_{387}	—	October 9, 2015	Haleakala	Pan-STARRS 1	·	1.7 km	MPC · JPL
822653	2015 TR_{387}	—	October 10, 2015	Haleakala	Pan-STARRS 1	EOS	1.5 km	MPC · JPL
822654	2015 TR_{392}	—	December 5, 2007	Mount Lemmon	Mount Lemmon Survey	H	380 m	MPC · JPL
822655	2015 TK_{394}	—	October 8, 2015	Haleakala	Pan-STARRS 1	·	1.2 km	MPC · JPL
822656	2015 TV_{396}	—	October 10, 2015	Haleakala	Pan-STARRS 1	·	520 m	MPC · JPL
822657	2015 TG_{397}	—	October 13, 2015	Haleakala	Pan-STARRS 1	·	2.5 km	MPC · JPL
822658	2015 TC_{400}	—	October 3, 2015	Mount Lemmon	Mount Lemmon Survey	·	2.0 km	MPC · JPL
822659	2015 TE_{401}	—	October 15, 2015	Haleakala	Pan-STARRS 1	·	770 m	MPC · JPL
822660	2015 TY_{401}	—	October 10, 2015	Haleakala	Pan-STARRS 1	·	510 m	MPC · JPL
822661	2015 TC_{403}	—	October 3, 2015	Mount Lemmon	Mount Lemmon Survey	EOS	1.4 km	MPC · JPL
822662	2015 TM_{403}	—	October 15, 2015	Haleakala	Pan-STARRS 1	EOS	1.4 km	MPC · JPL
822663	2015 TG_{404}	—	September 9, 2015	Haleakala	Pan-STARRS 1	·	610 m	MPC · JPL
822664	2015 TW_{409}	—	October 9, 2015	Haleakala	Pan-STARRS 1	·	750 m	MPC · JPL
822665	2015 TX_{410}	—	October 10, 2015	Haleakala	Pan-STARRS 1	·	970 m	MPC · JPL
822666	2015 TW_{411}	—	October 8, 2015	Haleakala	Pan-STARRS 1	·	770 m	MPC · JPL
822667	2015 TC_{416}	—	October 8, 2015	Haleakala	Pan-STARRS 1	·	2.2 km	MPC · JPL
822668	2015 TR_{417}	—	October 10, 2015	Haleakala	Pan-STARRS 1	·	1.8 km	MPC · JPL
822669	2015 TA_{418}	—	October 2, 2015	Mount Lemmon	Mount Lemmon Survey	HNS	700 m	MPC · JPL
822670	2015 TY_{418}	—	October 2, 2015	Mount Lemmon	Mount Lemmon Survey	·	1.3 km	MPC · JPL
822671	2015 TU_{422}	—	October 10, 2015	Haleakala	Pan-STARRS 1	ARM	2.6 km	MPC · JPL
822672	2015 TH_{423}	—	October 8, 2015	Haleakala	Pan-STARRS 1	EOS	1.5 km	MPC · JPL
822673	2015 TH_{428}	—	October 2, 2015	Mount Lemmon	Mount Lemmon Survey	·	850 m	MPC · JPL
822674	2015 TJ_{432}	—	October 10, 2015	Haleakala	Pan-STARRS 1	·	880 m	MPC · JPL
822675	2015 TK_{439}	—	October 10, 2015	Haleakala	Pan-STARRS 1	·	1.1 km	MPC · JPL
822676	2015 TT_{440}	—	October 12, 2015	Haleakala	Pan-STARRS 1	·	780 m	MPC · JPL
822677	2015 TW_{440}	—	October 8, 2015	Haleakala	Pan-STARRS 1	·	630 m	MPC · JPL
822678	2015 TL_{443}	—	October 8, 2015	Haleakala	Pan-STARRS 1	·	1.0 km	MPC · JPL
822679	2015 TB_{444}	—	October 13, 2015	Haleakala	Pan-STARRS 1	·	690 m	MPC · JPL
822680	2015 TV_{449}	—	October 9, 2015	Haleakala	Pan-STARRS 1	H	340 m	MPC · JPL
822681	2015 TW_{449}	—	October 3, 2015	Mount Lemmon	Mount Lemmon Survey	·	730 m	MPC · JPL
822682	2015 TM_{451}	—	October 9, 2015	Haleakala	Pan-STARRS 1	·	890 m	MPC · JPL
822683	2015 TA_{455}	—	October 5, 2015	Haleakala	Pan-STARRS 1	·	2.3 km	MPC · JPL
822684	2015 TS_{455}	—	October 13, 2015	Haleakala	Pan-STARRS 1	·	2.2 km	MPC · JPL
822685	2015 TS_{465}	—	October 13, 2015	Haleakala	Pan-STARRS 1	TIR	2.2 km	MPC · JPL
822686	2015 TG_{467}	—	October 9, 2015	Haleakala	Pan-STARRS 1	·	820 m	MPC · JPL
822687	2015 TZ_{471}	—	March 23, 2014	Kitt Peak	Spacewatch	NYS	1.0 km	MPC · JPL
822688	2015 UC_{3}	—	September 11, 2015	Haleakala	Pan-STARRS 1	·	570 m	MPC · JPL
822689	2015 UL_{10}	—	April 24, 2014	Haleakala	Pan-STARRS 1	CLA	1.2 km	MPC · JPL
822690	2015 UX_{10}	—	February 10, 2011	Catalina	CSS	H	430 m	MPC · JPL
822691	2015 US_{18}	—	September 12, 2015	Haleakala	Pan-STARRS 1	·	680 m	MPC · JPL
822692	2015 UG_{19}	—	October 1, 2008	Kitt Peak	Spacewatch	·	530 m	MPC · JPL
822693	2015 UH_{21}	—	February 3, 2006	Mauna Kea	P. A. Wiegert, R. Rasmussen	·	960 m	MPC · JPL
822694	2015 UQ_{21}	—	November 4, 1999	Kitt Peak	Spacewatch	·	560 m	MPC · JPL
822695	2015 UB_{22}	—	October 10, 2015	ESA OGS	ESA OGS	·	910 m	MPC · JPL
822696	2015 UT_{23}	—	August 21, 2015	Haleakala	Pan-STARRS 1	·	1.7 km	MPC · JPL
822697	2015 UQ_{27}	—	March 22, 2014	Mount Lemmon	Mount Lemmon Survey	·	680 m	MPC · JPL
822698	2015 US_{27}	—	June 5, 2014	Haleakala	Pan-STARRS 1	LIX	2.1 km	MPC · JPL
822699	2015 UU_{28}	—	October 2, 2015	Mount Lemmon	Mount Lemmon Survey	·	1.1 km	MPC · JPL
822700	2015 UT_{34}	—	October 10, 2015	Haleakala	Pan-STARRS 1	BRA	1.3 km	MPC · JPL

== 822701–822800 ==
back to top

Designation			Discovery			Properties		Ref
Permanent	Provisional	Named after	Date	Site	Discoverer(s)	Category	Diam.	Ref
822701	2015 UP_{40}	—	September 19, 1998	Sacramento Peak	SDSS	·	2.0 km	MPC · JPL
822702	2015 UQ_{40}	—	September 7, 2004	Kitt Peak	Spacewatch	·	1.7 km	MPC · JPL
822703	2015 UR_{41}	—	April 24, 2014	Haleakala	Pan-STARRS 1	·	750 m	MPC · JPL
822704	2015 UA_{42}	—	April 24, 2014	Mount Lemmon	Mount Lemmon Survey	V	440 m	MPC · JPL
822705	2015 UM_{43}	—	July 2, 2014	Haleakala	Pan-STARRS 1	TEL	990 m	MPC · JPL
822706	2015 UR_{43}	—	December 13, 2010	Mount Lemmon	Mount Lemmon Survey	EOS	1.4 km	MPC · JPL
822707	2015 UH_{45}	—	February 14, 2013	Haleakala	Pan-STARRS 1	·	840 m	MPC · JPL
822708	2015 UM_{46}	—	September 11, 2015	Haleakala	Pan-STARRS 1	·	1.5 km	MPC · JPL
822709	2015 UD_{47}	—	August 12, 2015	Haleakala	Pan-STARRS 1	·	1.8 km	MPC · JPL
822710	2015 UR_{50}	—	October 18, 2015	Haleakala	Pan-STARRS 1	·	2.0 km	MPC · JPL
822711	2015 UM_{56}	—	September 12, 2015	Haleakala	Pan-STARRS 1	THM	1.8 km	MPC · JPL
822712	2015 UG_{59}	—	October 9, 2015	Haleakala	Pan-STARRS 1	·	1.1 km	MPC · JPL
822713	2015 UT_{60}	—	May 8, 2008	Kitt Peak	Spacewatch	·	2.4 km	MPC · JPL
822714	2015 UT_{63}	—	October 21, 2015	Haleakala	Pan-STARRS 1	H	420 m	MPC · JPL
822715	2015 UF_{65}	—	September 12, 2015	Haleakala	Pan-STARRS 1	·	2.5 km	MPC · JPL
822716	2015 UZ_{74}	—	October 24, 2015	Haleakala	Pan-STARRS 1	·	2.6 km	MPC · JPL
822717	2015 UH_{77}	—	June 27, 2014	Haleakala	Pan-STARRS 1	·	1.7 km	MPC · JPL
822718	2015 UB_{78}	—	August 23, 2011	Haleakala	Pan-STARRS 1	NYS	970 m	MPC · JPL
822719	2015 UT_{80}	—	September 12, 2015	Haleakala	Pan-STARRS 1	·	1.3 km	MPC · JPL
822720	2015 UU_{80}	—	February 11, 2011	Mount Lemmon	Mount Lemmon Survey	·	2.3 km	MPC · JPL
822721	2015 UW_{84}	—	October 18, 2015	Haleakala	Pan-STARRS 1	H	390 m	MPC · JPL
822722	2015 UD_{85}	—	October 18, 2015	Haleakala	Pan-STARRS 1	H	370 m	MPC · JPL
822723	2015 UE_{85}	—	October 19, 2015	Haleakala	Pan-STARRS 1	H	480 m	MPC · JPL
822724	2015 UD_{87}	—	October 24, 2015	Haleakala	Pan-STARRS 1	·	2.3 km	MPC · JPL
822725	2015 UB_{88}	—	October 16, 2015	Kitt Peak	Spacewatch	·	1.6 km	MPC · JPL
822726	2015 UM_{88}	—	April 15, 2012	Haleakala	Pan-STARRS 1	·	2.4 km	MPC · JPL
822727	2015 UO_{90}	—	October 25, 2015	Haleakala	Pan-STARRS 1	TIR	2.2 km	MPC · JPL
822728	2015 UP_{90}	—	December 6, 2010	Mount Lemmon	Mount Lemmon Survey	EUP	2.5 km	MPC · JPL
822729	2015 UT_{92}	—	October 19, 2015	Haleakala	Pan-STARRS 1	·	840 m	MPC · JPL
822730	2015 UG_{93}	—	October 19, 2015	Haleakala	Pan-STARRS 1	·	890 m	MPC · JPL
822731	2015 UW_{93}	—	September 8, 2015	Haleakala	Pan-STARRS 1	·	970 m	MPC · JPL
822732	2015 UK_{94}	—	October 20, 2015	Haleakala	Pan-STARRS 1	·	880 m	MPC · JPL
822733	2015 US_{95}	—	October 18, 2015	Haleakala	Pan-STARRS 1	MAS	600 m	MPC · JPL
822734	2015 UT_{95}	—	October 19, 2015	Haleakala	Pan-STARRS 1	·	1.8 km	MPC · JPL
822735	2015 UW_{96}	—	October 19, 2015	Haleakala	Pan-STARRS 1	·	950 m	MPC · JPL
822736	2015 UE_{97}	—	October 23, 2015	Haleakala	Pan-STARRS 1	·	2.5 km	MPC · JPL
822737	2015 UB_{98}	—	October 23, 2015	Haleakala	Pan-STARRS 1	·	2.3 km	MPC · JPL
822738	2015 UT_{98}	—	July 25, 2015	Haleakala	Pan-STARRS 1	TIR	1.9 km	MPC · JPL
822739	2015 UV_{98}	—	June 26, 2011	Mount Lemmon	Mount Lemmon Survey	·	680 m	MPC · JPL
822740	2015 UY_{103}	—	October 23, 2015	Mount Lemmon	Mount Lemmon Survey	·	650 m	MPC · JPL
822741	2015 UE_{104}	—	October 18, 2015	Haleakala	Pan-STARRS 1	·	2.5 km	MPC · JPL
822742	2015 UV_{104}	—	October 24, 2015	Mount Lemmon	Mount Lemmon Survey	LUT	3.0 km	MPC · JPL
822743	2015 US_{105}	—	October 16, 2015	Mount Lemmon	Mount Lemmon Survey	T_{j} (2.97)	2.4 km	MPC · JPL
822744	2015 UW_{105}	—	October 24, 2015	Mount Lemmon	Mount Lemmon Survey	H	370 m	MPC · JPL
822745	2015 VL_{2}	—	October 12, 2015	Haleakala	Pan-STARRS 1	H	470 m	MPC · JPL
822746	2015 VK_{3}	—	October 12, 2015	Mount Lemmon	Mount Lemmon Survey	·	2.6 km	MPC · JPL
822747	2015 VV_{4}	—	July 23, 2015	Haleakala	Pan-STARRS 1	V	460 m	MPC · JPL
822748	2015 VM_{6}	—	January 4, 2012	Mount Lemmon	Mount Lemmon Survey	·	2.0 km	MPC · JPL
822749	2015 VP_{11}	—	September 18, 2015	Mount Lemmon	Mount Lemmon Survey	·	1.9 km	MPC · JPL
822750	2015 VA_{12}	—	October 30, 2008	Mount Lemmon	Mount Lemmon Survey	·	790 m	MPC · JPL
822751	2015 VU_{13}	—	April 5, 2014	Haleakala	Pan-STARRS 1	·	2.0 km	MPC · JPL
822752	2015 VY_{15}	—	April 2, 2014	Mount Lemmon	Mount Lemmon Survey	·	870 m	MPC · JPL
822753	2015 VA_{16}	—	September 25, 2015	Mount Lemmon	Mount Lemmon Survey	HYG	1.9 km	MPC · JPL
822754	2015 VD_{16}	—	September 19, 2006	Kitt Peak	Spacewatch	·	1.3 km	MPC · JPL
822755	2015 VF_{19}	—	October 23, 2015	Kitt Peak	Spacewatch	H	350 m	MPC · JPL
822756	2015 VP_{19}	—	April 4, 2014	Kitt Peak	Spacewatch	·	860 m	MPC · JPL
822757	2015 VK_{20}	—	September 12, 2015	Haleakala	Pan-STARRS 1	THM	1.6 km	MPC · JPL
822758	2015 VL_{20}	—	October 2, 2015	Kitt Peak	Spacewatch	PHO	700 m	MPC · JPL
822759	2015 VC_{24}	—	September 11, 2015	Haleakala	Pan-STARRS 1	·	580 m	MPC · JPL
822760	2015 VC_{28}	—	September 9, 2015	Haleakala	Pan-STARRS 1	·	970 m	MPC · JPL
822761	2015 VU_{30}	—	November 1, 2015	Haleakala	Pan-STARRS 1	·	1.8 km	MPC · JPL
822762	2015 VP_{32}	—	October 25, 2008	Kitt Peak	Spacewatch	·	610 m	MPC · JPL
822763	2015 VC_{33}	—	December 15, 2011	Haleakala	Pan-STARRS 1	·	960 m	MPC · JPL
822764	2015 VD_{33}	—	December 13, 2006	Mount Lemmon	Mount Lemmon Survey	·	1.1 km	MPC · JPL
822765	2015 VB_{34}	—	November 2, 2010	Kitt Peak	Spacewatch	·	1.3 km	MPC · JPL
822766	2015 VB_{35}	—	September 24, 2015	Mount Lemmon	Mount Lemmon Survey	·	1.0 km	MPC · JPL
822767	2015 VC_{35}	—	November 1, 2015	Mount Lemmon	Mount Lemmon Survey	·	1.9 km	MPC · JPL
822768	2015 VK_{35}	—	September 10, 2004	Kitt Peak	Spacewatch	MAS	500 m	MPC · JPL
822769	2015 VW_{39}	—	November 17, 2011	Kitt Peak	Spacewatch	·	890 m	MPC · JPL
822770	2015 VC_{41}	—	October 10, 2015	Haleakala	Pan-STARRS 1	·	730 m	MPC · JPL
822771	2015 VK_{41}	—	September 9, 2015	Haleakala	Pan-STARRS 1	·	710 m	MPC · JPL
822772	2015 VD_{43}	—	November 8, 2010	Mount Lemmon	Mount Lemmon Survey	EOS	1.5 km	MPC · JPL
822773	2015 VR_{43}	—	October 16, 2015	Haleakala	Pan-STARRS 1	V	370 m	MPC · JPL
822774	2015 VF_{49}	—	June 20, 2015	Haleakala	Pan-STARRS 1	JUN	780 m	MPC · JPL
822775	2015 VA_{52}	—	November 8, 2010	Mount Lemmon	Mount Lemmon Survey	EOS	1.4 km	MPC · JPL
822776	2015 VX_{52}	—	October 3, 2015	Haleakala	Pan-STARRS 1	·	1.8 km	MPC · JPL
822777	2015 VY_{52}	—	December 27, 2011	Kitt Peak	Spacewatch	·	1.8 km	MPC · JPL
822778	2015 VT_{57}	—	October 10, 2015	Kitt Peak	Spacewatch	HNS	880 m	MPC · JPL
822779	2015 VL_{58}	—	October 12, 2015	Haleakala	Pan-STARRS 1	615	1.0 km	MPC · JPL
822780	2015 VS_{58}	—	October 7, 2008	Mount Lemmon	Mount Lemmon Survey	·	740 m	MPC · JPL
822781	2015 VW_{60}	—	March 23, 2012	Mount Lemmon	Mount Lemmon Survey	·	2.2 km	MPC · JPL
822782	2015 VG_{62}	—	October 13, 2004	Kitt Peak	Spacewatch	·	730 m	MPC · JPL
822783	2015 VP_{65}	—	May 29, 2009	Kitt Peak	Spacewatch	H	470 m	MPC · JPL
822784	2015 VA_{69}	—	November 3, 2015	Mount Lemmon	Mount Lemmon Survey	·	1.1 km	MPC · JPL
822785	2015 VZ_{71}	—	May 7, 2014	Haleakala	Pan-STARRS 1	RAF	660 m	MPC · JPL
822786	2015 VT_{74}	—	October 12, 1993	Kitt Peak	Spacewatch	·	1.4 km	MPC · JPL
822787	2015 VY_{75}	—	April 28, 2012	Kitt Peak	Spacewatch	H	360 m	MPC · JPL
822788	2015 VW_{76}	—	November 3, 2010	Kitt Peak	Spacewatch	·	1.5 km	MPC · JPL
822789	2015 VV_{77}	—	October 15, 2002	Palomar	NEAT	·	1.0 km	MPC · JPL
822790	2015 VR_{79}	—	October 15, 2015	Haleakala	Pan-STARRS 1	·	1.2 km	MPC · JPL
822791	2015 VV_{79}	—	October 10, 2004	Kitt Peak	Deep Ecliptic Survey	·	2.5 km	MPC · JPL
822792	2015 VE_{89}	—	November 25, 2005	Kitt Peak	Spacewatch	·	1.5 km	MPC · JPL
822793	2015 VE_{91}	—	June 27, 2014	Haleakala	Pan-STARRS 1	·	2.1 km	MPC · JPL
822794	2015 VL_{91}	—	September 9, 2015	Haleakala	Pan-STARRS 1	V	570 m	MPC · JPL
822795	2015 VF_{92}	—	October 26, 2008	Kitt Peak	Spacewatch	·	650 m	MPC · JPL
822796	2015 VW_{92}	—	August 24, 2011	Haleakala	Pan-STARRS 1	·	820 m	MPC · JPL
822797	2015 VB_{95}	—	November 7, 2015	Haleakala	Pan-STARRS 1	H	370 m	MPC · JPL
822798	2015 VD_{95}	—	August 12, 2015	Haleakala	Pan-STARRS 1	·	2.0 km	MPC · JPL
822799	2015 VW_{95}	—	November 7, 2015	Catalina	CSS	EUN	1.1 km	MPC · JPL
822800	2015 VN_{97}	—	September 9, 2015	Haleakala	Pan-STARRS 1	V	460 m	MPC · JPL

== 822801–822900 ==
back to top

Designation			Discovery			Properties		Ref
Permanent	Provisional	Named after	Date	Site	Discoverer(s)	Category	Diam.	Ref
822801	2015 VC_{99}	—	October 9, 2015	Haleakala	Pan-STARRS 1	·	2.0 km	MPC · JPL
822802	2015 VX_{99}	—	October 10, 2015	Haleakala	Pan-STARRS 1	·	2.1 km	MPC · JPL
822803	2015 VV_{104}	—	February 9, 2005	La Silla	A. Boattini, H. Scholl	·	890 m	MPC · JPL
822804	2015 VV_{106}	—	October 27, 2008	Mount Lemmon	Mount Lemmon Survey	PHO	760 m	MPC · JPL
822805	2015 VW_{106}	—	September 12, 2015	Haleakala	Pan-STARRS 1	PHO	700 m	MPC · JPL
822806	2015 VB_{107}	—	September 14, 2005	Catalina	CSS	·	570 m	MPC · JPL
822807	2015 VW_{110}	—	October 9, 2015	Haleakala	Pan-STARRS 1	·	1.5 km	MPC · JPL
822808	2015 VZ_{114}	—	November 3, 2015	Mount Lemmon	Mount Lemmon Survey	H	380 m	MPC · JPL
822809	2015 VL_{116}	—	November 2, 2010	Kitt Peak	Spacewatch	·	1.7 km	MPC · JPL
822810	2015 VY_{118}	—	September 5, 2010	Mount Lemmon	Mount Lemmon Survey	·	1.7 km	MPC · JPL
822811	2015 VP_{123}	—	October 13, 2015	Haleakala	Pan-STARRS 1	H	490 m	MPC · JPL
822812	2015 VJ_{124}	—	May 6, 2014	Haleakala	Pan-STARRS 1	·	2.3 km	MPC · JPL
822813	2015 VM_{124}	—	September 19, 2015	Haleakala	Pan-STARRS 1	·	2.2 km	MPC · JPL
822814	2015 VO_{124}	—	May 30, 2006	Mount Lemmon	Mount Lemmon Survey	·	1.1 km	MPC · JPL
822815	2015 VQ_{128}	—	October 10, 2015	Haleakala	Pan-STARRS 1	·	2.9 km	MPC · JPL
822816	2015 VZ_{128}	—	July 29, 2008	Mount Lemmon	Mount Lemmon Survey	·	520 m	MPC · JPL
822817	2015 VD_{130}	—	November 1, 2015	Kitt Peak	Spacewatch	·	930 m	MPC · JPL
822818	2015 VF_{137}	—	November 1, 2015	Mount Lemmon	Mount Lemmon Survey	TIR	2.2 km	MPC · JPL
822819	2015 VJ_{137}	—	November 9, 2015	Wildberg	R. Apitzsch	EOS	1.4 km	MPC · JPL
822820	2015 VS_{138}	—	November 12, 2010	Kitt Peak	Spacewatch	EOS	1.3 km	MPC · JPL
822821	2015 VE_{145}	—	November 13, 2015	Mount Lemmon	Mount Lemmon Survey	·	1.1 km	MPC · JPL
822822	2015 VG_{145}	—	November 13, 2015	Mount Lemmon	Mount Lemmon Survey	·	850 m	MPC · JPL
822823	2015 VO_{146}	—	September 12, 2015	Haleakala	Pan-STARRS 1	·	1.8 km	MPC · JPL
822824	2015 VB_{151}	—	January 26, 2009	Mount Lemmon	Mount Lemmon Survey	·	710 m	MPC · JPL
822825	2015 VE_{155}	—	November 14, 2015	Mount Lemmon	Mount Lemmon Survey	·	1.5 km	MPC · JPL
822826	2015 VU_{157}	—	October 27, 2009	Mount Lemmon	Mount Lemmon Survey	·	2.5 km	MPC · JPL
822827	2015 VG_{160}	—	November 6, 2015	Mount Lemmon	Mount Lemmon Survey	·	2.3 km	MPC · JPL
822828	2015 VJ_{160}	—	January 21, 2012	Catalina	CSS	·	1.0 km	MPC · JPL
822829	2015 VC_{162}	—	November 2, 2015	Mount Lemmon	Mount Lemmon Survey	·	2.4 km	MPC · JPL
822830	2015 VW_{162}	—	October 12, 2015	Haleakala	Pan-STARRS 1	·	2.7 km	MPC · JPL
822831	2015 VS_{174}	—	November 10, 2015	Mount Lemmon	Mount Lemmon Survey	·	2.4 km	MPC · JPL
822832	2015 VW_{175}	—	November 9, 2015	Mount Lemmon	Mount Lemmon Survey	·	3.1 km	MPC · JPL
822833	2015 VV_{176}	—	August 13, 2015	Kitt Peak	Spacewatch	MAR	930 m	MPC · JPL
822834	2015 VX_{176}	—	November 1, 2015	Haleakala	Pan-STARRS 1	·	930 m	MPC · JPL
822835	2015 VZ_{177}	—	November 7, 2015	Mount Lemmon	Mount Lemmon Survey	·	1.0 km	MPC · JPL
822836	2015 VH_{179}	—	November 13, 2015	Mount Lemmon	Mount Lemmon Survey	·	2.1 km	MPC · JPL
822837	2015 VY_{180}	—	November 1, 2015	Mount Lemmon	Mount Lemmon Survey	·	810 m	MPC · JPL
822838	2015 VN_{181}	—	June 16, 2018	Haleakala	Pan-STARRS 1	·	1.1 km	MPC · JPL
822839	2015 VR_{181}	—	November 1, 2015	Haleakala	Pan-STARRS 1	·	1.7 km	MPC · JPL
822840	2015 VT_{181}	—	November 7, 2015	Haleakala	Pan-STARRS 1	·	2.0 km	MPC · JPL
822841	2015 VC_{183}	—	November 1, 2015	Haleakala	Pan-STARRS 1	·	1.5 km	MPC · JPL
822842	2015 VF_{187}	—	November 3, 2015	Mount Lemmon	Mount Lemmon Survey	THM	1.7 km	MPC · JPL
822843	2015 VK_{187}	—	November 1, 2015	Mount Lemmon	Mount Lemmon Survey	·	1.3 km	MPC · JPL
822844 Antoniogonzález	2015 VR_{187}	Antoniogonzález	November 8, 2015	Roque de los Muchachos	EURONEAR	·	690 m	MPC · JPL
822845	2015 VJ_{188}	—	November 2, 2015	Mount Lemmon	Mount Lemmon Survey	EUP	3.2 km	MPC · JPL
822846	2015 VM_{188}	—	November 14, 2015	Mount Lemmon	Mount Lemmon Survey	·	2.1 km	MPC · JPL
822847	2015 VW_{188}	—	November 7, 2015	Haleakala	Pan-STARRS 1	·	1.8 km	MPC · JPL
822848	2015 VZ_{189}	—	November 3, 2015	Mount Lemmon	Mount Lemmon Survey	·	1.5 km	MPC · JPL
822849	2015 VV_{190}	—	November 7, 2015	Haleakala	Pan-STARRS 1	·	1.7 km	MPC · JPL
822850	2015 VA_{192}	—	November 14, 2015	Mount Lemmon	Mount Lemmon Survey	·	2.0 km	MPC · JPL
822851	2015 VN_{202}	—	November 14, 2015	Mount Lemmon	Mount Lemmon Survey	·	1.1 km	MPC · JPL
822852	2015 VV_{203}	—	September 9, 2015	Haleakala	Pan-STARRS 1	·	1.0 km	MPC · JPL
822853	2015 VY_{203}	—	November 3, 2015	Mount Lemmon	Mount Lemmon Survey	PHO	650 m	MPC · JPL
822854	2015 VC_{209}	—	November 6, 2015	Haleakala	Pan-STARRS 1	·	2.3 km	MPC · JPL
822855	2015 VY_{209}	—	November 1, 2015	Haleakala	Pan-STARRS 1	H	440 m	MPC · JPL
822856	2015 VW_{213}	—	June 2, 2014	Haleakala	Pan-STARRS 1	H	460 m	MPC · JPL
822857	2015 WL_{13}	—	September 12, 2015	Haleakala	Pan-STARRS 1	·	2.5 km	MPC · JPL
822858	2015 WB_{15}	—	October 21, 2015	Haleakala	Pan-STARRS 1	H	420 m	MPC · JPL
822859	2015 WE_{15}	—	August 20, 2014	Haleakala	Pan-STARRS 1	·	2.5 km	MPC · JPL
822860	2015 WA_{19}	—	October 24, 2015	Mount Lemmon	Mount Lemmon Survey	·	2.8 km	MPC · JPL
822861	2015 WE_{23}	—	November 18, 2015	Haleakala	Pan-STARRS 1	H	410 m	MPC · JPL
822862	2015 WX_{23}	—	November 17, 2015	Haleakala	Pan-STARRS 1	·	1.1 km	MPC · JPL
822863	2015 WD_{24}	—	November 21, 2015	Mount Lemmon	Mount Lemmon Survey	·	1.1 km	MPC · JPL
822864	2015 WV_{24}	—	November 18, 2015	Haleakala	Pan-STARRS 1	H	400 m	MPC · JPL
822865	2015 WF_{27}	—	November 16, 2015	Haleakala	Pan-STARRS 1	·	970 m	MPC · JPL
822866	2015 WB_{28}	—	November 21, 2015	Mount Lemmon	Mount Lemmon Survey	·	950 m	MPC · JPL
822867	2015 WQ_{28}	—	November 21, 2015	Mount Lemmon	Mount Lemmon Survey	·	670 m	MPC · JPL
822868	2015 WS_{30}	—	November 22, 2015	Mount Lemmon	Mount Lemmon Survey	·	2.3 km	MPC · JPL
822869	2015 WZ_{36}	—	November 17, 2015	Haleakala	Pan-STARRS 1	·	2.3 km	MPC · JPL
822870	2015 XO_{6}	—	November 13, 2015	Mount Lemmon	Mount Lemmon Survey	·	890 m	MPC · JPL
822871	2015 XP_{8}	—	December 1, 2015	Haleakala	Pan-STARRS 1	·	950 m	MPC · JPL
822872	2015 XZ_{10}	—	October 9, 2015	Haleakala	Pan-STARRS 1	·	1.3 km	MPC · JPL
822873	2015 XB_{13}	—	June 5, 2014	Haleakala	Pan-STARRS 1	·	1.3 km	MPC · JPL
822874	2015 XH_{14}	—	November 3, 2008	Kitt Peak	Spacewatch	·	610 m	MPC · JPL
822875	2015 XB_{15}	—	August 12, 2015	Haleakala	Pan-STARRS 1	·	2.2 km	MPC · JPL
822876	2015 XA_{18}	—	September 9, 2015	Haleakala	Pan-STARRS 1	·	1.8 km	MPC · JPL
822877	2015 XW_{23}	—	November 27, 2011	Mount Lemmon	Mount Lemmon Survey	·	700 m	MPC · JPL
822878	2015 XC_{25}	—	August 22, 2004	Kitt Peak	Spacewatch	·	1.4 km	MPC · JPL
822879	2015 XU_{27}	—	August 18, 2009	Kitt Peak	Spacewatch	·	2.0 km	MPC · JPL
822880	2015 XA_{28}	—	November 7, 2015	Haleakala	Pan-STARRS 1	(5)	820 m	MPC · JPL
822881	2015 XW_{29}	—	December 2, 2015	Haleakala	Pan-STARRS 1	·	1.9 km	MPC · JPL
822882	2015 XF_{36}	—	December 2, 2015	Haleakala	Pan-STARRS 1	·	2.2 km	MPC · JPL
822883	2015 XD_{42}	—	February 28, 2014	Haleakala	Pan-STARRS 1	·	720 m	MPC · JPL
822884	2015 XK_{44}	—	November 18, 2008	Kitt Peak	Spacewatch	·	490 m	MPC · JPL
822885	2015 XR_{45}	—	October 26, 2011	Haleakala	Pan-STARRS 1	MAR	630 m	MPC · JPL
822886	2015 XC_{46}	—	September 9, 2015	Haleakala	Pan-STARRS 1	·	1.4 km	MPC · JPL
822887	2015 XL_{54}	—	December 2, 2015	Haleakala	Pan-STARRS 1	·	1.1 km	MPC · JPL
822888	2015 XO_{54}	—	July 1, 2014	Haleakala	Pan-STARRS 1	·	2.2 km	MPC · JPL
822889	2015 XV_{54}	—	December 4, 2015	Haleakala	Pan-STARRS 1	H	370 m	MPC · JPL
822890	2015 XL_{60}	—	July 7, 2014	Haleakala	Pan-STARRS 1	·	2.2 km	MPC · JPL
822891	2015 XD_{63}	—	November 18, 2015	Kitt Peak	Spacewatch	MAR	840 m	MPC · JPL
822892	2015 XF_{63}	—	September 18, 2009	Kitt Peak	Spacewatch	LIX	2.6 km	MPC · JPL
822893	2015 XE_{64}	—	December 1, 2015	Haleakala	Pan-STARRS 1	EOS	1.5 km	MPC · JPL
822894	2015 XM_{65}	—	November 13, 2015	Mount Lemmon	Mount Lemmon Survey	·	1.3 km	MPC · JPL
822895	2015 XK_{68}	—	April 7, 2008	Mount Lemmon	Mount Lemmon Survey	·	1.8 km	MPC · JPL
822896	2015 XV_{79}	—	December 3, 2015	Mount Lemmon	Mount Lemmon Survey	·	2.3 km	MPC · JPL
822897	2015 XX_{81}	—	September 19, 2015	Haleakala	Pan-STARRS 1	·	3.1 km	MPC · JPL
822898	2015 XW_{84}	—	December 3, 2015	Haleakala	Pan-STARRS 1	·	2.4 km	MPC · JPL
822899	2015 XY_{84}	—	December 3, 2015	Haleakala	Pan-STARRS 1	·	1.0 km	MPC · JPL
822900	2015 XG_{89}	—	December 4, 2015	Haleakala	Pan-STARRS 1	H	440 m	MPC · JPL

== 822901–823000 ==
back to top

Designation			Discovery			Properties		Ref
Permanent	Provisional	Named after	Date	Site	Discoverer(s)	Category	Diam.	Ref
822901	2015 XH_{93}	—	October 21, 2015	Haleakala	Pan-STARRS 1	·	2.2 km	MPC · JPL
822902	2015 XU_{96}	—	December 4, 2015	Haleakala	Pan-STARRS 1	·	1.0 km	MPC · JPL
822903	2015 XJ_{100}	—	December 4, 2015	Haleakala	Pan-STARRS 1	·	600 m	MPC · JPL
822904	2015 XC_{103}	—	January 13, 2011	Mount Lemmon	Mount Lemmon Survey	·	2.3 km	MPC · JPL
822905	2015 XR_{114}	—	July 29, 2014	Haleakala	Pan-STARRS 1	·	1.3 km	MPC · JPL
822906	2015 XG_{116}	—	December 4, 2015	Haleakala	Pan-STARRS 1	·	1.1 km	MPC · JPL
822907	2015 XT_{119}	—	October 8, 2015	Haleakala	Pan-STARRS 1	·	2.3 km	MPC · JPL
822908	2015 XK_{121}	—	October 19, 2015	Haleakala	Pan-STARRS 1	·	780 m	MPC · JPL
822909	2015 XD_{122}	—	October 14, 2015	Haleakala	Pan-STARRS 1	·	660 m	MPC · JPL
822910	2015 XB_{134}	—	December 4, 2015	Mount Lemmon	Mount Lemmon Survey	·	710 m	MPC · JPL
822911	2015 XE_{134}	—	January 30, 2006	Kitt Peak	Spacewatch	·	650 m	MPC · JPL
822912	2015 XL_{135}	—	November 10, 2004	Kitt Peak	Spacewatch	NYS	720 m	MPC · JPL
822913	2015 XQ_{136}	—	August 18, 2009	Kitt Peak	Spacewatch	THM	1.6 km	MPC · JPL
822914	2015 XE_{137}	—	November 5, 2007	Mount Lemmon	Mount Lemmon Survey	(5)	960 m	MPC · JPL
822915	2015 XT_{137}	—	September 19, 2003	Kitt Peak	Spacewatch	·	2.5 km	MPC · JPL
822916	2015 XY_{137}	—	January 16, 2011	Mount Lemmon	Mount Lemmon Survey	·	2.0 km	MPC · JPL
822917	2015 XP_{139}	—	December 4, 2015	Mount Lemmon	Mount Lemmon Survey	·	980 m	MPC · JPL
822918	2015 XR_{141}	—	December 4, 2015	Mount Lemmon	Mount Lemmon Survey	·	1.3 km	MPC · JPL
822919	2015 XG_{150}	—	November 8, 2015	Mount Lemmon	Mount Lemmon Survey	·	2.3 km	MPC · JPL
822920	2015 XN_{152}	—	December 4, 2015	Haleakala	Pan-STARRS 1	·	3.1 km	MPC · JPL
822921	2015 XW_{153}	—	December 5, 2015	Haleakala	Pan-STARRS 1	·	2.6 km	MPC · JPL
822922	2015 XH_{154}	—	November 6, 2015	Mount Lemmon	Mount Lemmon Survey	H	520 m	MPC · JPL
822923	2015 XT_{156}	—	November 20, 2015	Mount Lemmon	Mount Lemmon Survey	·	3.2 km	MPC · JPL
822924	2015 XZ_{156}	—	July 1, 2014	Haleakala	Pan-STARRS 1	·	1.9 km	MPC · JPL
822925	2015 XJ_{157}	—	October 4, 2007	Kitt Peak	Spacewatch	H	350 m	MPC · JPL
822926	2015 XH_{159}	—	May 31, 2014	Haleakala	Pan-STARRS 1	PHO	840 m	MPC · JPL
822927	2015 XX_{159}	—	December 16, 2007	Mount Lemmon	Mount Lemmon Survey	·	940 m	MPC · JPL
822928	2015 XN_{163}	—	October 19, 2015	XuYi	PMO NEO Survey Program	·	2.2 km	MPC · JPL
822929	2015 XQ_{170}	—	October 18, 2014	Mount Lemmon	Mount Lemmon Survey	·	1.5 km	MPC · JPL
822930	2015 XX_{178}	—	September 17, 2009	Mount Lemmon	Mount Lemmon Survey	·	1.9 km	MPC · JPL
822931	2015 XW_{182}	—	January 2, 2011	Mount Lemmon	Mount Lemmon Survey	·	2.1 km	MPC · JPL
822932	2015 XV_{183}	—	July 18, 2007	Mount Lemmon	Mount Lemmon Survey	·	940 m	MPC · JPL
822933	2015 XK_{190}	—	October 2, 2015	Haleakala	Pan-STARRS 1	·	2.1 km	MPC · JPL
822934	2015 XV_{192}	—	September 22, 2009	Bergisch Gladbach	W. Bickel	·	2.0 km	MPC · JPL
822935	2015 XD_{193}	—	September 14, 2009	Catalina	CSS	·	2.0 km	MPC · JPL
822936	2015 XD_{196}	—	December 6, 2015	Mount Lemmon	Mount Lemmon Survey	·	860 m	MPC · JPL
822937	2015 XS_{197}	—	December 6, 2015	Mount Lemmon	Mount Lemmon Survey	·	2.3 km	MPC · JPL
822938	2015 XZ_{198}	—	November 6, 2015	Mount Lemmon	Mount Lemmon Survey	H	380 m	MPC · JPL
822939	2015 XX_{199}	—	November 7, 2015	Mount Lemmon	Mount Lemmon Survey	·	650 m	MPC · JPL
822940	2015 XX_{203}	—	September 19, 2015	Haleakala	Pan-STARRS 1	·	2.0 km	MPC · JPL
822941	2015 XG_{204}	—	June 3, 2014	Haleakala	Pan-STARRS 1	·	2.1 km	MPC · JPL
822942	2015 XM_{207}	—	November 22, 2015	Mount Lemmon	Mount Lemmon Survey	·	2.4 km	MPC · JPL
822943	2015 XW_{207}	—	September 23, 2015	Haleakala	Pan-STARRS 1	·	1.1 km	MPC · JPL
822944	2015 XN_{208}	—	December 6, 2015	Haleakala	Pan-STARRS 1	·	460 m	MPC · JPL
822945	2015 XA_{209}	—	April 30, 2006	Kitt Peak	Spacewatch	·	880 m	MPC · JPL
822946	2015 XH_{210}	—	December 3, 2015	Mount Lemmon	Mount Lemmon Survey	·	540 m	MPC · JPL
822947	2015 XM_{214}	—	March 6, 2013	Haleakala	Pan-STARRS 1	·	1.0 km	MPC · JPL
822948	2015 XZ_{216}	—	November 24, 2008	Kitt Peak	Spacewatch	·	680 m	MPC · JPL
822949	2015 XW_{219}	—	April 10, 2013	Haleakala	Pan-STARRS 1	·	660 m	MPC · JPL
822950	2015 XN_{222}	—	December 6, 2015	Haleakala	Pan-STARRS 1	·	2.1 km	MPC · JPL
822951	2015 XN_{227}	—	November 10, 2015	Mount Lemmon	Mount Lemmon Survey	·	910 m	MPC · JPL
822952	2015 XK_{231}	—	July 31, 2014	Haleakala	Pan-STARRS 1	·	2.1 km	MPC · JPL
822953	2015 XP_{231}	—	December 6, 2015	Haleakala	Pan-STARRS 1	·	620 m	MPC · JPL
822954	2015 XQ_{231}	—	December 6, 2015	Haleakala	Pan-STARRS 1	·	590 m	MPC · JPL
822955	2015 XT_{232}	—	December 6, 2015	Haleakala	Pan-STARRS 1	·	1.9 km	MPC · JPL
822956	2015 XO_{240}	—	August 27, 2011	Haleakala	Pan-STARRS 1	·	720 m	MPC · JPL
822957	2015 XF_{248}	—	March 31, 2012	Mount Lemmon	Mount Lemmon Survey	·	2.5 km	MPC · JPL
822958	2015 XK_{249}	—	October 21, 2015	Haleakala	Pan-STARRS 1	·	1.9 km	MPC · JPL
822959	2015 XF_{250}	—	December 7, 2015	Haleakala	Pan-STARRS 1	·	2.7 km	MPC · JPL
822960	2015 XM_{258}	—	November 10, 1999	Kitt Peak	Spacewatch	·	1.7 km	MPC · JPL
822961	2015 XE_{262}	—	November 2, 2015	Mount Lemmon	Mount Lemmon Survey	H	390 m	MPC · JPL
822962	2015 XZ_{263}	—	December 4, 2015	Mount Lemmon	Mount Lemmon Survey	·	2.3 km	MPC · JPL
822963	2015 XP_{264}	—	September 28, 2008	Mount Lemmon	Mount Lemmon Survey	·	550 m	MPC · JPL
822964	2015 XT_{268}	—	July 26, 2011	Haleakala	Pan-STARRS 1	·	640 m	MPC · JPL
822965	2015 XL_{269}	—	June 4, 2013	Mount Lemmon	Mount Lemmon Survey	·	2.6 km	MPC · JPL
822966	2015 XA_{270}	—	January 29, 2009	Kitt Peak	Spacewatch	MAS	480 m	MPC · JPL
822967	2015 XG_{282}	—	September 10, 2010	Siding Spring	SSS	·	1.6 km	MPC · JPL
822968	2015 XW_{282}	—	September 26, 2011	Haleakala	Pan-STARRS 1	·	780 m	MPC · JPL
822969	2015 XZ_{285}	—	December 7, 2015	Haleakala	Pan-STARRS 1	·	520 m	MPC · JPL
822970	2015 XR_{286}	—	April 24, 2012	Haleakala	Pan-STARRS 1	·	2.7 km	MPC · JPL
822971	2015 XD_{292}	—	November 22, 2015	Mount Lemmon	Mount Lemmon Survey	·	740 m	MPC · JPL
822972	2015 XP_{294}	—	September 30, 2010	Mount Lemmon	Mount Lemmon Survey	·	1.1 km	MPC · JPL
822973	2015 XX_{295}	—	October 26, 2011	Haleakala	Pan-STARRS 1	PHO	730 m	MPC · JPL
822974	2015 XU_{296}	—	December 7, 2015	Haleakala	Pan-STARRS 1	NYS	860 m	MPC · JPL
822975	2015 XA_{301}	—	September 23, 2011	Kitt Peak	Spacewatch	·	600 m	MPC · JPL
822976	2015 XL_{301}	—	May 21, 2014	Haleakala	Pan-STARRS 1	·	800 m	MPC · JPL
822977	2015 XF_{303}	—	October 16, 2007	Mount Lemmon	Mount Lemmon Survey	·	810 m	MPC · JPL
822978	2015 XW_{303}	—	April 24, 2014	Mount Lemmon	Mount Lemmon Survey	·	730 m	MPC · JPL
822979	2015 XA_{310}	—	October 27, 2008	Kitt Peak	Spacewatch	·	580 m	MPC · JPL
822980	2015 XF_{310}	—	April 20, 2012	Kitt Peak	Spacewatch	·	2.5 km	MPC · JPL
822981	2015 XM_{327}	—	August 16, 2014	Haleakala	Pan-STARRS 1	·	2.5 km	MPC · JPL
822982	2015 XA_{328}	—	September 19, 2009	Kitt Peak	Spacewatch	·	2.4 km	MPC · JPL
822983	2015 XM_{349}	—	September 20, 2009	Kitt Peak	Spacewatch	·	1.8 km	MPC · JPL
822984	2015 XY_{358}	—	November 3, 2015	Haleakala	Pan-STARRS 1	·	890 m	MPC · JPL
822985	2015 XP_{359}	—	November 2, 2015	Haleakala	Pan-STARRS 1	·	790 m	MPC · JPL
822986	2015 XG_{361}	—	November 2, 2015	Haleakala	Pan-STARRS 1	·	1.9 km	MPC · JPL
822987	2015 XL_{370}	—	January 12, 2011	Mount Lemmon	Mount Lemmon Survey	·	2.1 km	MPC · JPL
822988	2015 XO_{373}	—	September 21, 2004	Kitt Peak	Spacewatch	·	690 m	MPC · JPL
822989	2015 XQ_{373}	—	September 6, 1997	Caussols	ODAS	·	570 m	MPC · JPL
822990	2015 XL_{374}	—	December 12, 2015	Haleakala	Pan-STARRS 1	H	380 m	MPC · JPL
822991	2015 XM_{376}	—	December 8, 2015	Mount Lemmon	Mount Lemmon Survey	·	900 m	MPC · JPL
822992	2015 XF_{377}	—	December 12, 2015	Haleakala	Pan-STARRS 1	H	430 m	MPC · JPL
822993	2015 XG_{378}	—	October 20, 2012	Mount Lemmon	Mount Lemmon Survey	H	470 m	MPC · JPL
822994	2015 XC_{379}	—	April 8, 2014	Mount Lemmon	Mount Lemmon Survey	H	340 m	MPC · JPL
822995	2015 XM_{382}	—	December 8, 2015	Haleakala	Pan-STARRS 1	·	640 m	MPC · JPL
822996	2015 XU_{383}	—	December 9, 2015	Haleakala	Pan-STARRS 1	·	1.4 km	MPC · JPL
822997	2015 XH_{384}	—	November 6, 2015	Haleakala	Pan-STARRS 1	·	810 m	MPC · JPL
822998	2015 XT_{385}	—	December 9, 2015	Haleakala	Pan-STARRS 1	H	460 m	MPC · JPL
822999	2015 XX_{385}	—	July 10, 2014	Haleakala	Pan-STARRS 1	H	510 m	MPC · JPL
823000	2015 XA_{387}	—	April 29, 2014	Haleakala	Pan-STARRS 1	H	420 m	MPC · JPL

== Meaning of names ==
As minor planet discoveries are confirmed, they are given a permanent number by the IAU's Minor Planet Center (MPC), and the discoverers can then submit names for them, following the IAU's naming conventions. The list below concerns those minor planets in the specified number-range that have received names, and explains the meanings of those names.

Official naming citations of newly named small Solar System bodies are approved and published in a bulletin by IAU's Working Group for Small Bodies Nomenclature (WGSBN). Before May 2021, citations were published in MPC's Minor Planet Circulars for many decades. Recent citations can also be found on the JPL Small-Body Database (SBDB). Until his death in 2016, German astronomer Lutz D. Schmadel compiled these citations into the Dictionary of Minor Planet Names (DMP) and regularly updated the collection.

Based on Paul Herget's The Names of the Minor Planets, Schmadel also researched the unclear origin of numerous asteroids, most of which had been named prior to World War II. This article incorporates text from this source, which is in the public domain: SBDB New namings may only be added to this list below after official publication as the preannouncement of names is condemned. The WGSBN publishes a comprehensive guideline for the naming rules of non-cometary small Solar System bodies.

Named minor planet	Provisional	This minor planet was named for...	Ref · Catalog
822844 Antoniogonzález	2015 VR_{187}	Antonio González, Spanish employee of Sodepal, a public agency that encourages economic and social revitalization on La Palma. He has pioneered astrotourism on La Palma, promoting the Astronomical Viewpoints Network, astronomical theming of rural houses, astrophotography, group observations and educational projects for kids.	IAU · 822844
