= Douglas Gough =

British astronomer

Douglas Owen Gough FRS (born 8 February 1941) is a British astronomer, Professor Emeritus of Theoretical Astrophysics in the University of Cambridge, and Leverhulme Emeritus Fellow.

== Life ==
Gough was educated at Hackney Downs School before attending St John's College, Cambridge, where he studied at the Department of Applied Mathematics and Theoretical Physics (DAMTP). He subsequently worked with John Cox at JILA (Colorado) from 1966 to 1967, at the Goddard Institute for Space Studies and with Edward Spiegel at the Courant Institute of Mathematical Sciences in New York from 1967 to 1969. He returned to Cambridge in 1969 to join the Institute of Theoretical Astronomy and DAMTP. He was director of the Institute of Astronomy from 1999 to 2004, deputy director from 1993 to 1999. He has been a Fellow of Churchill College, Cambridge, since 1972, a Science Research Council Senior Fellow (1978–1983), a Fellow Adjoint of JILA since 1986, an honorary professor of astronomy at Queen Mary and Westfield College, University of London (1986–2009), and a visiting professor of physics (now consulting professor) at Stanford University since 1996. He was appointed distinguished visiting professor at the University of Mumbai in 2015. He is a Fellow of the Royal Society, a Fellow of the Institute of Physics, a Foreign Member of the Royal Danish Academy of Sciences and Letters, and a Mousquetaire d'Armagnac. He is married to Rosanne; they have four children: Kim McCabe, Heidi Rose, Julian Gough and Russell Gough, and seven grandchildren.

== Scientific work ==
Gough began his career working mainly on the problem of convection in stars and how it interacts with stellar pulsations. His best known works from this period include the a criterion for the inhibition of convection by magnetic fields in stars, the application of the anelastic approximation to stellar atmospheres, and a model of convection that is the foundation of methods still used today to model the interaction of convection and pulsations in classical variable stars and in the Sun. In 1976, he and his PhD student Jørgen Christensen-Dalsgaard predicted that the global oscillation frequencies of the Sun could be used to infer its deep structure. This is regarded as the beginning of what became known as helioseismology and, by extension, asteroseismology of solar-like oscillators; Gough and Christensen-Dalsgaard are regarded as the "fathers" of the field. Gough and his students subsequently published extensively on the internal structure of the Sun and the calculation thereof, including determining features like the depth of the solar convection zone, the Sun's interior rotation, the protosolar helium abundance and the main-sequence age. He pioneered seismological investigation into the equation of state in the Sun and the helium abundance in stellar convection zones, and has elucidated the geometry of asteroseismic waves.

His doctoral students have included the Raja of Mahmudabad, Chris Jones, Douglas N. C. Lin, John Gribbin, Jørgen Christensen-Dalsgaard, Michael Thompson, Margarida Cunha, Marcus Brüggen and Pascale Garaud.

== Honours and awards ==
- 1982 James Arthur Prize (Harvard University)
- 1984 William Hopkins Prize (Cambridge Philosophical Society)
- 1994 George Ellery Hale Prize (American Astronomical Society)
- 2002 Eddington Medal (Royal Astronomical Society)
- 2003 Her Majesty's Pioneer to the Life of the Nation
- 2010 Gold Medal of the Royal Astronomical Society
- 2024 Crafoord Prize in Astronomy.
