= 160-minute solar cycle =

Disputed periodic oscillation in the solar surface

The 160-minute solar cycle was an apparent periodic oscillation in the solar surface which was observed in a number of early sets of data collected for helioseismology.

The presence of a 160 minute cycle in the Sun is not substantiated by contemporary solar observations, and the historical signal is considered by mainstream scientists to occur as the redistribution of power from the diurnal cycle as a result of the observation window and atmospheric extinction.

== History ==
The birth of helioseismology occurred in 1976 with the publications of papers from Brookes, Isaak and van der Raay and Severny, Kotov and Tsap, both of which reported upon the observation of a 160-minute solar oscillation with an amplitude of approximately two metres per second.

It was rapidly realised that this frequency corresponded to one-ninth of a day, and therefore the authenticity of this signal was in some doubt. If a non-sinusoidal oscillation is present in a time-series then power will be seen in a periodogram at not only the frequency of the oscillation, but also harmonics at integer multiples of this frequency. A re-analysis of data obtained over the period of 1974–1976 by Brookes et al. showed that the evidence for a stable, phase-coherent 160 minute oscillation at a constant amplitude was far from conclusive. Although the signal could be detected the amplitude appeared variable and was lower than first reported.

A re-affirmation of the 160 minute signal was obtained by analysis of data from groups in Crimea and Stanford over a long period of time. It was found that the phase showed a steady drift, indicative that the frequency being used in analysis differed slightly from that in the data. This implied that a period of 160.01 minutes produced a better fit to the data. Evidence also emerged that multiple sets of observations were phase-coherent. These facts contributed to impressions that the origin of the observed signal was stellar and not terrestrial in origin.

In 1989 as higher-quality multiple-year datasets from a single site became available it was shown by Elsworth et al. that the period of the 160 minute signal was indeed 160.00 minutes, and the amplitude was dependent upon both the length and quality of data obtained in a season, with the signal more prominent at time where atmospheric condition were worse. The group were able to demonstrate that the signal may be simulated by a slightly distorted diurnal sine-wave such as may be obtained by differential atmospheric extinction.

Although claims of the presence of a 160-minute period in the Sun were still presented by Kotov et al. in 1990, and 1991, the mainstream scientific establishment had moved on.

== Contemporary observations ==
There are currently two solar-observation networks, the BiSON and GONG networks which consist of a global network of stations, as well as space based instruments such as the GOLF instrument aboard the SOHO spacecraft. These are able to keep the Sun under near-continuous observation, and so largely eliminate the influence of diurnal signals. Data from these instruments shows no oscillation at 160 minutes.
