= HIP 94292 =

Red giant in the constellation Lyra

- Location of HIP 94292 (circled)

Observation data Epoch J2000.0 Equinox ICRS
- Constellation: Cygnus
- Right ascension: 19^{h} 11^{m} 32.53446^{s}
- Declination: +45° 31′ 22.6081″
- Apparent magnitude (V): 10.05

Characteristics
- Evolutionary stage: Red-giant branch star
- Spectral type: G8III
- B−V color index: 0.90
- J−H color index: 0.474
- J−K color index: 0.549

Astrometry
Radial velocity (R_{v})	17.408899±0.007546 km/s
Proper motion (μ)	RA: 3.138 mas/yr Dec.: −15.988 mas/yr
Parallax (π)	2.4141±0.0098 mas
Distance	1,351 ± 5 ly (414 ± 2 pc)

Details
Mass	1.24 M_{☉}
Radius	5.636 R_{☉}
Luminosity	18.759 L_{☉}
Surface gravity (log g)	3.029 cgs
Temperature	5069 K
Metallicity [Fe/H]	−0.32±0.03 dex
Age	4.61±0.23 Gyr

Other designations
- BD+45° 2850, HIP 94292, KIC 9145955, TIC 158626942, TYC 3542-2131-1, 2MASS J19113253+4531225, Gaia DR3 2130219769257640576

Database references
SIMBAD	data

HIP 94292 (commonly referred to by its KIC designation KIC 9145955) is a G-type red giant branch star located 1351 light years from Earth in the northern constellation of Lyra. It is 1.24 times more massive than the Sun and has a radius of 5.636 solar radii.

It has a small scale magnetic field of 65 Gauss that is largely concentrated in the photosphere of the star.

== Description ==
It has an apparent magnitude of 10.05, which makes it too faint to observe with the naked eye, but readily visible through a 35-mm aperture telescope. Gaia EDR3 parallax measurements place the star some 1,351 light-years (414 parsecs) distant, and it is receding with a heliocentric radial velocity of +17.4 km/s.

HIP 94292 is an evolved giant star with a spectral type of G8III. It is currently on the red-giant branch (RGB), undergoing the CNO cycle within a hydrogen shell surrounding an inert core made of helium. With a radius 5.6 times that of the Sun and an effective temperature just over 5,000 K (4,730 °C; 8,540 °F), it radiates 18.8 times the luminosity of the Sun from its photosphere. Due to its higher mass of 1.24 M_{☉}, it is further evolved than the Sun despite a similar age of 4.61±0.23 billion years.

The helium core has been precisely measured to have a mass of 0.210±0.002 M_{☉} and a radius of 0.0307±0.0002 R_{☉}. As expected of RGB stars, HIP 94292 exhibits solar-like oscillations.

== Magnetic field ==
HIP 94292 was found to have small scale magnetic fields with an upper limit of around 65 Gauss that concentrates at a height of 13,100 kilometers in the photosphere of the star.

== See also ==
- KIC 9970396: a similar red giant in an eclipsing binary.
