= Yvonne Elsworth =

Irish physicist

- Education: University of Manchester (BSc, PhD)
- Awards: FRS (2015); FInstP; FRAS
- Scientific career
- Fields: Astronomy; Astrophysics; Helioseismology
- Workplaces: University of Birmingham
- Thesis: A field-compensated multiplex spectrometer for the visible region (1976)
- Website: www.birmingham.ac.uk/schools/physics/people/staff-profile.aspx?ReferenceId=8416

Yvonne Patricia Elsworth FRS FInstP FRAS is an Irish-born physicist, and Professor of Helioseismology and Poynting Professor of Physics in the School of Physics and Astronomy at the University of Birmingham. Elsworth was until 2015 also the Head of the Birmingham Solar Oscillations Network (BiSON), the longest running helioseismology network with data covering more than three solar cycles.

== Education ==
In 1970, Elsworth graduated with honours from the Victoria University of Manchester with a Bachelor of Science degree in physics. In 1976 she was awarded a Doctor of Philosophy degree from the School of Physics at the Victoria University of Manchester. Her thesis was titled "A field-compensated multiplex spectrometer for the visible region" and was concerned with the design and implementation of a novel form of field-widened Michelson interferometer designed to study faint, extended sources like those coming from optical emission from the thermosphere.

== Research ==
In 1984, Elsworth was appointed to a faculty position at the University of Birmingham, where she focused on helioseismology, solar physics, solar variability, and latterly asteroseismology, stellar physics and stellar variability. She participated in and later led the Birmingham Solar Oscillation Network. Her research has been funded by the Science and Technology Facilities Council (STFC).

== Awards and honours ==
Elsworth was elected a Fellow of the Royal Society (FRS) in 2015 for her work on helioseismology. Her certificate of election reads:

Professor Elsworth's pioneering work in establishing and maintaining an important scientific investigation into the internal structure of the Sun using helioseismic data from the autonomous Birmingham network of observatories complemented by extant data from modes of intermediate degree has permitted an unprecedented investigation into the inner core of the Sun where the nuclear reactions are taking place. This has led to the conclusion that the deficiency of solar neutrinos detected on Earth was an issue of nuclear physics or particle physics, not of solar modelling; it also established that the very centre of the Sun rotates no more rapidly than the convective envelope, a matter of serious dynamical concern. Furthermore, Elsworth has led her group to study solar-cycle-related variations in the Sun's convective envelope, providing important structural information to theorists investigating the solar dynamo. Her current extension to seismic studies of stars other than the Sun is already contributing to a transformation in our understanding of stellar evolution.

In 2011, she was awarded the Payne-Gaposchkin Medal and Prize from the Institute of Physics (IoP). and in 2020 the Gold Medal of the Royal Astronomical Society in Geophysics.

Elsworth is also a Fellow of the Institute of Physics (FInstP) and a Fellow of the Royal Astronomical Society (FRAS).
