= Roy A. Tucker =

American astronomer (1951-2021)

Minor planets discovered: 713
see § List of discovered minor planets

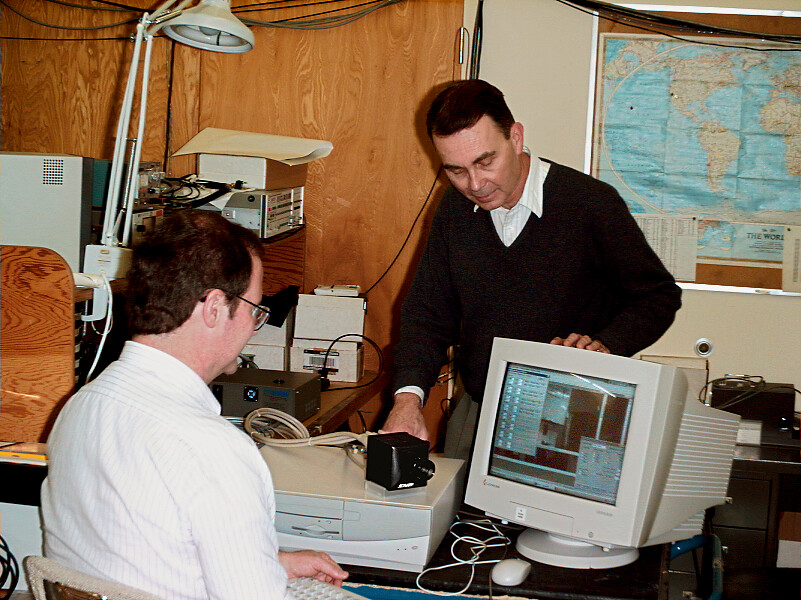
Jack Harvey and Roy Tucker with the new high resolution camera for the GONG project, 1998

Roy Anthony Tucker (December 11, 1951 – March 5, 2021) was an American astronomer best known for the co-discovery of near-Earth asteroid 99942 Apophis (formerly known as 2004 MN_{4}) along with David J. Tholen and Fabrizio Bernardi of the University of Hawaiʻi. He was a prolific discoverer of minor planets, credited by the Minor Planet Center with the discovery of 702 numbered minor planets between 1996 and 2010. He also discovered two comets: 328P/LONEOS–Tucker and C/2004 Q1, a Jupiter-family and near-parabolic comet, respectively.

== Biography ==
Tucker was born in Jackson, Mississippi and raised in Memphis, Tennessee. In 1966, he became a member of Memphis Astronomical Society and received a master's degree in Scientific Instrumentation from the University of California, Santa Barbara. He worked as a senior engineer in the Imaging Technology Laboratory of the University of Arizona and as an instrumentalist at Kitt Peak National Observatory. He observed and discovered minor planets at his private Goodricke-Pigott Observatory in southern Arizona.

== Death ==
Tucker died on March 5, 2021, due to pancreatic cancer.

== Recognition ==
In 2002, he was one of five researchers awarded a "Gene Shoemaker Near Earth Object Grant", by the Planetary Society.

The main-belt asteroid 10914 Tucker, discovered by Paul Comba in 1997, was named in his honor.

== List of discovered minor planets ==
10220 Pigott	20 October 1997	list
14542 Karitskaya	29 September 1997	list
16783 Bychkov	14 December 1996	list
16861 Lipovetsky	27 December 1997	list
17025 Pilachowski	13 March 1999	list
17941 Horbatt	6 May 1999	list
21523 GONG	26 June 1998	list
21811 Burroughs	5 October 1999	list
23884 Karenharvey	20 September 1998	list
24259 Chriswalker	12 December 1999	list
25275 Jocelynbell	14 November 1998	list
26924 Johnharvey	30 December 1996	list
27049 Kraus	18 September 1998	list
28341 Bingaman	13 March 1999	list
29825 Dunyazade	20 February 1999	list
29874 Rogerculver	14 April 1999	list
31086 Gehringer	12 January 1997	list
31098 Frankhill	9 June 1997	list
31190 Toussaint	27 December 1997	list
31556 Shatner	13 March 1999	list
31557 Holleybakich	13 March 1999	list
32608 Hallas	24 August 2001	list
32621 Talcott	8 September 2001	list
33103 Pintar	27 December 1997	list
34791 Ericcraine	18 September 2001	list

35734 Dilithium	14 April 1999	list
39741 Komm	9 January 1997	list
(40204) 1998 SV_{27}	23 September 1998	list
40248 Yukikajiura	12 December 1998	list
40775 Kalafina	5 October 1999	list
40776 Yeungkwongyu	7 October 1999	list
41199 Wakanaootaki	21 November 1999	list
42271 Keikokubota	24 August 2001	list
44027 Termain	2 January 1998	list
44455 Artdula	7 November 1998	list
44475 Hikarumasai	16 November 1998	list
47466 Mayatoyoshima	31 December 1999	list
49272 Bryce Canyon	27 October 1998	list
49382 Lynnokamoto	12 December 1998	list
51985 Kirby	22 September 2001	list
52649 Chrismith	27 December 1997	list
53237 Simonson	9 February 1999	list
53250 Beucher	20 February 1999	list
53253 Zeiler	13 March 1999	list
54563 Kinokonasu	31 August 2000	list
55108 Beamueller	24 August 2001	list
55212 Yukitoayatsuji	12 September 2001	list
55222 Makotoshinkai	12 September 2001	list
55223 Akiraifukube	12 September 2001	list
55319 Takanashi	18 September 2001	list

55320 Busler	19 September 2001	list
55397 Hackman	22 September 2001	list
55559 Briancraine	18 December 2001	list
(57333) 2001 QX_{246}	24 August 2001	list
(57470) 2001 ST_{115}	19 September 2001	list
(57520) 2001 SB_{289}	22 September 2001	list
(57521) 2001 SD_{289}	23 September 2001	list
(57522) 2001 SR_{290}	25 September 2001	list
(57523) 2001 ST_{290}	25 September 2001	list
(57537) 2001 TQ_{13}	11 October 2001	list
(57541) 2001 TV_{18}	11 October 2001	list
(57542) 2001 TW_{18}	15 October 2001	list
(61144) 2000 NW_{8}	5 July 2000	list
(63419) 2001 KP_{64}	21 May 2001	list
(63891) 2001 SN_{4}	18 September 2001	list
(64001) 2001 SU_{115}	19 September 2001	list
(64090) 2001 SA_{289}	22 September 2001	list
(64506) 2001 VJ_{76}	12 November 2001	list
(66177) 1998 WE_{5}	21 November 1998	list
(66237) 1999 ET_{5}	13 March 1999	list
(68473) 2001 SC_{289}	23 September 2001	list
(69126) 2003 EC_{60}	7 March 2003	list
(69836) 1998 SZ_{2}	18 September 1998	list
(70110) 1999 LK	6 June 1999	list
(70455) 1999 TM_{20}	5 October 1999	list

(70456) 1999 TZ_{20}	7 October 1999	list
(70748) 1999 VV_{22}	13 November 1999	list
(72877) 2001 KL_{2}	21 May 2001	list
(74226) 1998 SZ_{12}	21 September 1998	list
(74828) 1999 TB_{21}	7 October 1999	list
(77561) 2001 KS_{1}	16 May 2001	list
(77863) 2001 RA_{145}	7 September 2001	list
(78111) 2002 MO_{1}	16 June 2002	list
(78568) 2002 RW_{181}	13 September 2002	list
(78571) 2002 RQ_{211}	13 September 2002	list
(78925) 2003 SC_{112}	18 September 2003	list
(79445) 1997 VT_{6}	9 November 1997	list
(79836) 1998 WX_{19}	26 November 1998	list
(79980) 1999 DX_{3}	20 February 1999	list
(79986) 1999 ER_{5}	13 March 1999	list
(82992) 2001 QN_{154}	27 August 2001	list
(83238) 2001 RC_{46}	9 September 2001	list
(83370) 2001 SL_{4}	17 September 2001	list
(83371) 2001 SQ_{4}	18 September 2001	list
83464 Irishmccalla	19 September 2001	list
(83661) 2001 TL_{17}	13 October 2001	list
(84864) 2003 AM_{84}	11 January 2003	list
(84924) 2003 VB_{6}	15 November 2003	list
85585 Mjolnir	21 March 1998	list
(86210) 1999 TT_{20}	7 October 1999	list

(86211) 1999 TW_{20}	7 October 1999	list
(88511) 2001 QK_{154}	24 August 2001	list
(88512) 2001 QM_{154}	25 August 2001	list
(88525) 2001 QU_{174}	25 August 2001	list
(88568) 2001 QG_{244}	24 August 2001	list
(88621) 2001 RR_{10}	9 September 2001	list
(88622) 2001 RU_{10}	10 September 2001	list
(89265) 2001 VE_{5}	8 November 2001	list
(89283) 2001 VJ_{17}	11 November 2001	list
90455 Irenehernandez	12 February 2004	list
(90456) 2004 CV_{2}	13 February 2004	list
91275 Billsmith	13 March 1999	list
91607 Delaboudiniere	5 October 1999	list
(95033) 2002 AX_{26}	12 January 2002	list
(95239) 2002 CH_{46}	6 February 2002	list
(95780) 2003 EH_{60}	7 March 2003	list
(96310) 1996 XA_{26}	14 December 1996	list
(96387) 1998 BW_{41}	19 January 1998	list
(96539) 1998 SW_{27}	24 September 1998	list
(96574) 1998 UJ_{23}	30 October 1998	list
99942 Apophis	19 June 2004	list^{[A]}^{[B]}
101383 Karloff	30 October 1998	list
101432 Adamwest	14 November 1998	list
101713 Marston	20 February 1999	list
101723 Finger	13 March 1999	list

101781 Gojira	14 April 1999	list
(101813) 1999 JX_{7}	14 May 1999	list
(102234) 1999 TK_{20}	5 October 1999	list
108496 Sullenberger	21 May 2001	list
109330 Clemente	24 August 2001	list
(109331) 2001 QY_{142}	24 August 2001	list
(109435) 2001 QB_{197}	22 August 2001	list
109712 Giger	12 September 2001	list
110026 Hamill	17 September 2001	list
(110331) 2001 SE_{289}	23 September 2001	list
(110332) 2001 SP_{289}	25 September 2001	list
(110333) 2001 SS_{290}	25 September 2001	list
110404 Itoemi	11 October 2001	list
110405 Itoyumi	12 October 2001	list
110408 Nakajima	13 October 2001	list
(110416) 2001 TU_{18}	11 October 2001	list
113333 Tyler	13 September 2002	list
(113405) 2002 SS_{24}	28 September 2002	list
113461 McCay	30 September 2002	list
(115093) 2003 SQ_{16}	17 September 2003	list
(115428) 2003 SH_{313}	18 September 2003	list
(115498) 2003 UN_{26}	25 October 2003	list
(115499) 2003 UO_{26}	25 October 2003	list
(115500) 2003 UC_{27}	23 October 2003	list
(115501) 2003 UV_{27}	22 October 2003	list

(115502) 2003 UX_{27}	22 October 2003	list
(115524) 2003 UD_{47}	21 October 2003	list
(115525) 2003 UF_{47}	16 October 2003	list
(115526) 2003 UL_{47}	20 October 2003	list
(115937) 2003 WG_{26}	18 November 2003	list
(117265) 2004 TH_{1}	4 October 2004	list
(117427) 2005 AY_{21}	6 January 2005	list
(117540) 2005 EN	1 March 2005	list
117582 Kenjikawai	7 March 2005	list
119248 Corbally	10 September 2001	list
119846 Goshiina	6 February 2002	list
121121 Koyoharugotoge	19 April 1999	list
121133 Kenflurchick	15 May 1999	list
124114 Bergersen	21 April 2001	list
124368 Nickphoenix	24 August 2001	list
124398 Iraklisimonia	22 August 2001	list
(124450) 2001 QN_{264}	25 August 2001	list
(124569) 2001 SJ_{4}	17 September 2001	list
(124570) 2001 SS_{4}	18 September 2001	list
(124571) 2001 SV_{4}	18 September 2001	list
(124845) 2001 TH_{15}	12 October 2001	list
126906 Andykulessa	10 March 2002	list
127477 Fredalee	14 September 2002	list
128228 Williammarsh	18 September 2003	list
128593 Balfourwhitney	20 August 2004	list

128795 Douglaswalker	13 September 2004	list
128882 Jennydebenedetti	22 September 2004	list
(128893) 2004 TK	3 October 2004	list
(128894) 2004 TL	3 October 2004	list
(129145) 2005 CE	1 February 2005	list
(129169) 2005 JU_{77}	10 May 2005	list
(129291) 2005 SJ_{60}	26 September 2005	list
(130129) 1999 XS_{127}	12 December 1999	list
(131395) 2001 KS_{61}	18 May 2001	list
(131474) 2001 RA_{82}	12 September 2001	list
(131738) 2001 YF_{114}	19 December 2001	list
(133352) 2003 SZ_{123}	18 September 2003	list
(133564) 2003 US_{26}	25 October 2003	list
(133565) 2003 UE_{27}	23 October 2003	list
(133594) 2003 UX_{79}	18 October 2003	list
(133888) 2004 QZ_{4}	21 August 2004	list
(133935) 2004 TK_{1}	4 October 2004	list
(134404) 1997 UG_{8}	29 October 1997	list
(135237) 2001 SP_{4}	18 September 2001	list
(136469) 2005 FM_{2}	17 March 2005	list
(136796) 1997 BO_{6}	30 January 1997	list
136818 Selqet	29 June 1997	list
(136842) 1997 XN_{9}	6 December 1997	list
(137316) 1999 TQ_{20}	5 October 1999	list
(139623) 2001 QR_{142}	24 August 2001	list

(139761) 2001 QA_{286}	28 August 2001	list
(139784) 2001 RW	8 September 2001	list
(139962) 2001 SG_{4}	17 September 2001	list
(140348) 2001 TK_{15}	13 October 2001	list
(140353) 2001 TX_{18}	15 October 2001	list
(142289) 2002 RJ_{137}	12 September 2002	list
(142398) 2002 SP_{19}	28 September 2002	list
(142399) 2002 SQ_{19}	28 September 2002	list
(144104) 2004 BN_{69}	27 January 2004	list
(144942) 2005 EB_{24}	3 March 2005	list
(144972) 2005 EM_{119}	7 March 2005	list
(145839) 1998 YK_{12}	23 December 1998	list
(146404) 2001 QZ_{180}	27 August 2001	list
(147529) 2004 DP_{53}	26 February 2004	list
(147874) 2006 QP_{39}	19 August 2006	list
(147876) 2006 QL_{58}	27 August 2006	list
(149772) 2004 RN_{27}	6 September 2004	list
(149787) 2005 ER_{94}	10 March 2005	list
(150762) 2001 QD_{197}	22 August 2001	list
(152244) 2005 SD_{88}	24 September 2005	list
(152259) 2005 ST_{134}	29 September 2005	list
(152368) 2005 UM_{158}	28 October 2005	list
(152748) 1998 YF_{27}	28 December 1998	list
(153411) 2001 QX_{142}	24 August 2001	list
(153486) 2001 RB_{82}	12 September 2001	list

(154489) 2003 EN_{51}	7 March 2003	list
(154828) 2004 RT_{8}	6 September 2004	list
(154829) 2004 RA_{9}	6 September 2004	list
(154930) 2004 TJ_{1}	4 October 2004	list
(156039) 2001 SR_{4}	18 September 2001	list
(156473) 2002 CK_{46}	6 February 2002	list
(157073) 2003 UL_{56}	19 October 2003	list
(157245) 2004 RU_{110}	7 September 2004	list
(157304) 2004 SR_{24}	20 September 2004	list
(157594) 2005 VC_{3}	4 November 2005	list
(157873) 1999 JW_{7}	14 May 1999	list
(158804) 2003 SS_{269}	28 September 2003	list
(158973) 2004 RP_{289}	12 September 2004	list
(159007) 2004 TL_{1}	4 October 2004	list
(159010) 2004 TX_{7}	3 October 2004	list
(159012) 2004 TT_{19}	13 October 2004	list
(159179) 2005 TN_{47}	5 October 2005	list
(159400) 1998 VL	7 November 1998	list
(159815) 2003 SF_{220}	26 September 2003	list
(159843) 2003 VA_{6}	15 November 2003	list
(159882) 2004 RQ_{289}	14 September 2004	list
(161385) 2003 UM_{27}	23 October 2003	list
(161423) 2003 WE_{26}	18 November 2003	list
(161728) 2006 SQ_{20}	18 September 2006	list
(162992) 2001 SJ_{73}	18 September 2001	list

(164233) 2004 SX_{53}	22 September 2004	list
(164781) 1999 DA_{4}	20 February 1999	list
(167176) 2003 SO_{269}	28 September 2003	list
(167429) 2003 WX_{157}	28 November 2003	list
(167812) 2005 CG	1 February 2005	list
(169252) 2001 SC_{116}	22 September 2001	list
(170409) 2003 UK_{27}	23 October 2003	list
(170410) 2003 UN_{27}	24 October 2003	list
(170411) 2003 UT_{27}	22 October 2003	list
(170418) 2003 UC_{56}	19 October 2003	list
(170696) 2004 BY_{18}	18 January 2004	list
(170996) 2005 EL_{4}	1 March 2005	list
(170997) 2005 EF_{7}	1 March 2005	list
(171518) 1998 TO	10 October 1998	list
(172395) 2003 AN_{84}	11 January 2003	list
(172510) 2003 ST_{224}	28 September 2003	list
(172522) 2003 SP_{269}	28 September 2003	list
(172536) 2003 UM_{26}	25 October 2003	list
(172537) 2003 UH_{27}	23 October 2003	list
(172546) 2003 UH_{56}	19 October 2003	list
(172548) 2003 UA_{80}	17 October 2003	list
(172894) 2005 GX_{17}	2 April 2005	list
(173751) 2001 RE_{46}	12 September 2001	list
(174693) 2003 UW_{27}	22 October 2003	list
(174695) 2003 UG_{47}	16 October 2003	list

(175136) 2005 DY_{1}	28 February 2005	list
(175225) 2005 GE_{111}	10 April 2005	list
(175449) 2006 QG_{58}	17 August 2006	list
(177154) 2003 SH_{16}	17 September 2003	list
(177526) 2004 FC_{16}	23 March 2004	list
(177690) 2005 FX_{2}	16 March 2005	list
(178993) 2001 RS_{2}	9 September 2001	list
(178999) 2001 RT_{10}	10 September 2001	list
(180098) 2003 EF_{60}	6 March 2003	list
(181347) 2006 RU_{22}	15 September 2006	list
(181425) 2006 SF_{279}	28 September 2006	list
(181616) 2006 WX_{129}	25 November 2006	list
(182399) 2001 RX	8 September 2001	list
(182476) 2001 SD_{116}	22 September 2001	list
(183112) 2002 RF_{137}	12 September 2002	list
(183441) 2003 AK_{84}	11 January 2003	list
(183585) 2003 SZ_{201}	18 September 2003	list
(183774) 2004 BX_{18}	18 January 2004	list
(184282) 2005 BV_{2}	19 January 2005	list
(185133) 2006 SY_{110}	21 September 2006	list
(185155) 2006 SA_{198}	27 September 2006	list
(185289) 2006 UM_{215}	20 October 2006	list
(185360) 2006 VZ_{88}	14 November 2006	list
(185407) 2006 WN_{129}	23 November 2006	list
(186436) 2002 RG_{137}	12 September 2002	list

(186784) 2004 DB_{53}	26 February 2004	list
(187306) 2005 UG_{4}	25 October 2005	list
(187343) 2005 UL_{158}	28 October 2005	list
(187554) 2006 VT_{12}	11 November 2006	list
(188119) 2002 AV_{183}	6 January 2002	list
(188701) 2005 TD_{50}	3 October 2005	list
(188722) 2005 UK_{2}	23 October 2005	list
(189252) 2004 TW_{19}	14 October 2004	list
(189953) 2003 UA_{56}	19 October 2003	list
(190077) 2004 TL_{11}	4 October 2004	list
(191464) 2003 SL_{269}	26 September 2003	list
(191481) 2003 SH_{312}	26 September 2003	list
(191482) 2003 SJ_{312}	27 September 2003	list
(191497) 2003 UL_{27}	23 October 2003	list
(191759) 2004 TA_{12}	6 October 2004	list
(191760) 2004 TH_{12}	7 October 2004	list
(192687) 1999 TC_{21}	7 October 1999	list
(193865) 2001 QS_{142}	24 August 2001	list
(196412) 2003 GK_{54}	1 April 2003	list
(196963) 2003 UD_{56}	19 October 2003	list
(196985) 2003 UY_{79}	18 October 2003	list
(196986) 2003 UC_{80}	17 October 2003	list
(197971) 2004 RW_{110}	11 September 2004	list
(198074) 2004 SH_{2}	16 September 2004	list
(198120) 2004 TZ_{11}	5 October 2004	list

(198122) 2004 TY_{14}	9 October 2004	list
(198126) 2004 TS_{18}	14 October 2004	list
(198403) 2004 VA_{55}	9 November 2004	list
(200156) 1998 SA_{3}	18 September 1998	list
(200654) 2001 TN_{17}	14 October 2001	list
(202094) 2004 TM_{18}	12 October 2004	list
(202356) 2005 EF_{214}	7 March 2005	list
(203264) 2001 QQ_{249}	24 August 2001	list
(203961) 2003 SZ_{111}	18 September 2003	list
(204009) 2003 UD_{27}	23 October 2003	list
(204010) 2003 US_{27}	22 October 2003	list
(204011) 2003 UX_{29}	23 October 2003	list
(204360) 2004 TX_{14}	5 October 2004	list
(204492) 2005 BG_{29}	31 January 2005	list
(204692) 2006 ET	4 March 2006	list
(204791) 2006 QK_{58}	27 August 2006	list
(204926) 2008 TX_{8}	6 October 2008	list
(204934) 2008 UO_{99}	29 October 2008	list
(206448) 2003 SY_{271}	26 September 2003	list
(206491) 2003 UW_{79}	16 October 2003	list
(207193) 2005 EZ_{38}	3 March 2005	list
(207688) 2007 RQ_{16}	11 September 2007	list
(207775) 2007 TZ_{70}	13 October 2007	list
(207828) 2007 TB_{376}	15 October 2007	list
(208458) 2001 TW_{205}	11 October 2001	list

(209162) 2003 UK_{56}	19 October 2003	list
(209525) 2004 TA_{8}	5 October 2004	list
(210136) 2006 ST	16 September 2006	list
(210861) 2001 RF_{46}	12 September 2001	list
(211565) 2003 ST_{120}	17 September 2003	list
(211595) 2003 SQ_{269}	28 September 2003	list
(211836) 2004 FG_{2}	17 March 2004	list
(212029) 2005 CW_{27}	3 February 2005	list
(212706) 2007 RU_{16}	12 September 2007	list
(212768) 2007 TO_{70}	12 October 2007	list
(214005) 2004 CO_{2}	12 February 2004	list
(214220) 2005 EQ_{94}	10 March 2005	list
(214773) 2006 UU_{64}	22 October 2006	list
(214895) 2007 TD_{22}	8 October 2007	list
(215643) 2003 UJ_{27}	23 October 2003	list
(215644) 2003 UR_{27}	22 October 2003	list
(216540) 2001 SO_{4}	18 September 2001	list
(216695) 2004 QY_{4}	21 August 2004	list
(216762) 2005 SU_{134}	29 September 2005	list
(216941) 1999 TX_{20}	7 October 1999	list
(217242) 2003 KY_{16}	25 May 2003	list
(217511) 2006 UP_{1}	16 October 2006	list
(217871) 2001 QG_{191}	22 August 2001	list
(217881) 2001 QZ_{285}	23 August 2001	list
(217927) 2001 TU_{13}	12 October 2001	list

(218426) 2004 RN_{164}	10 September 2004	list
(218482) 2004 TY_{7}	4 October 2004	list
(218483) 2004 TY_{11}	5 October 2004	list
(218484) 2004 TG_{12}	7 October 2004	list
(220330) 2003 FZ_{119}	23 March 2003	list
(220739) 2004 TU_{19}	14 October 2004	list
(220921) 2005 GS_{21}	4 April 2005	list
(223722) 2004 RY_{110}	11 September 2004	list
(223797) 2004 TM_{19}	8 October 2004	list
(223883) 2004 VC_{1}	2 November 2004	list
(225212) 2008 RF_{25}	3 September 2008	list
(225768) 2001 SQ_{289}	25 September 2001	list
(225898) 2002 AA_{1}	6 January 2002	list
(226513) 2003 UP_{27}	16 October 2003	list
(226517) 2003 UA_{47}	21 October 2003	list
(226631) 2004 FH_{2}	17 March 2004	list
(226856) 2004 TX_{11}	5 October 2004	list
(226859) 2004 TZ_{14}	10 October 2004	list
(227055) 2005 EE_{39}	7 March 2005	list
(227333) 2005 UL_{2}	23 October 2005	list
(227334) 2005 UJ_{3}	24 October 2005	list
(228846) 2003 EG_{60}	6 March 2003	list
(229294) 2005 EH_{2}	3 March 2005	list
(229424) 2005 TT_{48}	8 October 2005	list
(229824) 2008 UQ_{1}	21 October 2008	list

(230895) 2004 TF_{12}	7 October 2004	list
(230896) 2004 TN_{18}	12 October 2004	list
(231132) 2005 TV_{13}	1 October 2005	list
(231144) 2005 UE_{4}	24 October 2005	list
(231145) 2005 UF_{4}	24 October 2005	list
(231707) 1998 TP	10 October 1998	list
(231840) 2000 QZ_{225}	31 August 2000	list
(231946) 2001 KT_{1}	18 May 2001	list
(232291) 2002 RR_{181}	13 September 2002	list
(232784) 2004 QT_{6}	20 August 2004	list
(232830) 2004 TG	3 October 2004	list
(233596) 2007 RY_{134}	12 September 2007	list
(233597) 2007 RJ_{135}	13 September 2007	list
(233752) 2008 TY_{8}	6 October 2008	list
(233784) 2008 UR_{1}	21 October 2008	list
(235692) 2004 SP_{25}	20 September 2004	list
(235997) 2005 GQ_{18}	2 April 2005	list
(236113) 2005 SC_{21}	26 September 2005	list
(236124) 2005 SZ_{190}	29 September 2005	list
(236138) 2005 UJ_{4}	25 October 2005	list
(236907) 2007 TR_{67}	8 October 2007	list
(237015) 2008 SL_{2}	22 September 2008	list
(237080) 2008 SL_{287}	23 September 2008	list
(238414) 2004 FF_{2}	16 March 2004	list
(238507) 2004 TW_{12}	7 October 2004	list

(238837) 2005 UH_{2}	23 October 2005	list
(239381) 2007 SM_{1}	18 September 2007	list
(239394) 2007 TE_{22}	8 October 2007	list
(239415) 2007 TK_{74}	11 October 2007	list
(240662) 2005 EZ_{30}	1 March 2005	list
(240675) 2005 EX_{119}	8 March 2005	list
(240676) 2005 EJ_{120}	8 March 2005	list
(240917) 2006 EU	4 March 2006	list
(241311) 2007 VM_{7}	2 November 2007	list
(241381) 2008 SO_{141}	24 September 2008	list
(241807) 2001 RQ_{2}	8 September 2001	list
(242660) 2005 QR_{88}	29 August 2005	list
(243149) 2007 TT_{22}	9 October 2007	list
(243350) 2008 UW_{199}	28 October 2008	list
(245568) 2005 UR_{150}	26 October 2005	list
(246022) 2006 UN_{2}	16 October 2006	list
(246090) 2007 AN_{25}	15 January 2007	list
(246169) 2007 RQ_{13}	11 September 2007	list
(246201) 2007 RH_{135}	12 September 2007	list
(246287) 2007 TX_{70}	13 October 2007	list
(246960) 1999 TS_{20}	7 October 1999	list
(247812) 2003 SB_{124}	18 September 2003	list
(247859) 2003 UJ_{47}	20 October 2003	list
(247860) 2003 UM_{47}	20 October 2003	list
(247865) 2003 UD_{80}	17 October 2003	list

(248003) 2004 EE_{25}	15 March 2004	list
(248860) 2006 UM_{5}	16 October 2006	list
(249041) 2007 TW_{70}	13 October 2007	list
(249254) 2008 SK_{2}	22 September 2008	list
(249871) 2001 QZ_{190}	22 August 2001	list
(249896) 2001 SK_{4}	17 September 2001	list
(250534) 2004 QW_{4}	21 August 2004	list
(250801) 2005 UD_{2}	22 October 2005	list
(251058) 2006 SU	16 September 2006	list
(251170) 2006 UE_{3}	16 October 2006	list
(253037) 2002 SR_{19}	28 September 2002	list
(254346) 2004 TQ_{19}	13 October 2004	list
(254469) 2005 EG_{1}	1 March 2005	list
(254566) 2005 FH_{2}	16 March 2005	list
(254862) 2005 SU_{1}	23 September 2005	list
(255088) 2005 UV_{41}	24 October 2005	list
(256035) 2006 UQ_{62}	19 October 2006	list
(256136) 2006 VU_{12}	11 November 2006	list
(258149) 2001 SM_{4}	18 September 2001	list
(258216) 2001 TM_{17}	14 October 2001	list
(260473) 2005 BH_{28}	31 January 2005	list
(260854) 2005 QP_{82}	29 August 2005	list
(260939) 2005 SL_{9}	24 September 2005	list
(261141) 2005 TL_{63}	5 October 2005	list
(261438) 2005 VD_{3}	4 November 2005	list

(263614) 2008 GH_{3}	1 April 2008	list
(264536) 2001 SR	17 September 2001	list
(264945) 2002 VR_{127}	11 November 2002	list
(265117) 2003 UQ_{26}	25 October 2003	list
(265398) 2004 TR_{18}	14 October 2004	list
(266108) 2006 SV_{218}	26 September 2006	list
(267798) 2003 SW_{271}	26 September 2003	list
(267823) 2003 UK_{47}	20 October 2003	list
(268049) 2004 QK_{24}	26 August 2004	list
(268113) 2004 TG_{1}	3 October 2004	list
(268756) 2006 RV_{22}	15 September 2006	list
(268899) 2007 BY_{49}	26 January 2007	list
(269322) 2008 SR_{207}	27 September 2008	list
(271775) 2004 TZ_{12}	8 October 2004	list
(272011) 2005 DW_{1}	28 February 2005	list
(272042) 2005 EP_{94}	10 March 2005	list
(272089) 2005 FL_{2}	17 March 2005	list
(274337) 2008 RP_{25}	5 September 2008	list
(274673) 2008 TA_{186}	7 October 2008	list
(275841) 2001 SH_{4}	17 September 2001	list
(276380) 2002 VS_{127}	11 November 2002	list
(276912) 2004 TC_{12}	7 October 2004	list
(277217) 2005 QH_{143}	31 August 2005	list
(277271) 2005 SL_{58}	26 September 2005	list
(278198) 2007 EO_{12}	9 March 2007	list

(278451) 2007 TO_{22}	9 October 2007	list
(278807) 2008 SQ_{244}	29 September 2008	list
(279090) 2008 WH_{131}	19 November 2008	list
(280374) 2003 UR_{26}	25 October 2003	list
(280375) 2003 UB_{27}	23 October 2003	list
(280380) 2003 UZ_{79}	17 October 2003	list
(281077) 2006 QD_{136}	28 August 2006	list
(281440) 2008 SV_{71}	22 September 2008	list
(284062) 2005 ER	1 March 2005	list
(285566) 2000 NM_{10}	5 July 2000	list
(287122) 2002 RU_{181}	13 September 2002	list
(287480) 2003 AJ_{84}	11 January 2003	list
(288950) 2004 SA_{56}	23 September 2004	list
(290173) 2005 RJ_{29}	12 September 2005	list
(290464) 2005 TS_{169}	10 October 2005	list
(290487) 2005 UH_{4}	25 October 2005	list
(291898) 2006 QN_{4}	17 August 2006	list
(293725) 2007 RS_{16}	12 September 2007	list
(294168) 2007 TY_{369}	12 October 2007	list
(295544) 2008 SK_{7}	22 September 2008	list
(295874) 2008 WT_{32}	20 November 2008	list
(296830) 2009 WG_{46}	18 November 2009	list
(296980) 2010 EC_{104}	15 March 2010	list
(298447) 2003 UE_{56}	19 October 2003	list
(298655) 2004 CS_{2}	12 February 2004	list

(298888) 2004 SD_{61}	23 September 2004	list
(298889) 2004 TB_{8}	5 October 2004	list
(298890) 2004 TA_{14}	5 October 2004	list
(298891) 2004 TP_{18}	13 October 2004	list
(300323) 2007 QW_{2}	21 August 2007	list
(300451) 2007 TA_{68}	10 October 2007	list
(300452) 2007 TY_{70}	13 October 2007	list
(300454) 2007 TM_{74}	13 October 2007	list
(303249) 2004 QL_{24}	26 August 2004	list
(303305) 2004 TS_{19}	13 October 2004	list
(303498) 2005 EN_{135}	9 March 2005	list
(303598) 2005 HR_{5}	30 April 2005	list
(303743) 2005 QZ_{86}	29 August 2005	list
(304288) 2006 SJ_{64}	19 September 2006	list
(305225) 2007 XB_{11}	3 December 2007	list
(305502) 2008 EU_{100}	8 March 2008	list
(306912) 2001 TZ_{216}	13 October 2001	list
(307357) 2002 RW_{208}	14 September 2002	list
(308093) 2004 VT_{13}	3 November 2004	list
(308376) 2005 RA_{26}	11 September 2005	list
(309358) 2007 TZ_{69}	10 October 2007	list
(309360) 2007 TL_{74}	13 October 2007	list
(310920) 2003 SC_{123}	18 September 2003	list
(310950) 2003 UP_{26}	25 October 2003	list
(310955) 2003 UB_{56}	19 October 2003	list

(311645) 2006 RW_{22}	15 September 2006	list
(312013) 2007 RV_{16}	12 September 2007	list
(312069) 2007 TL_{18}	8 October 2007	list
(313202) 2001 RV	7 September 2001	list
(313750) 2003 UU_{317}	17 October 2003	list
(314091) 2005 DS_{1}	28 February 2005	list
(314337) 2005 TT_{49}	9 October 2005	list
(315258) 2007 TK_{18}	8 October 2007	list
(315259) 2007 TO_{18}	8 October 2007	list
(315506) 2008 AH_{29}	10 January 2008	list
(317865) 2003 UU_{27}	22 October 2003	list
(318109) 2004 JG_{2}	11 May 2004	list
(318162) 2004 QU_{4}	20 August 2004	list
(318190) 2004 RL_{102}	7 September 2004	list
(318278) 2004 TH_{18}	11 October 2004	list
(321084) 2008 SE_{147}	24 September 2008	list
(322145) 2010 WH_{9}	29 September 2005	list
(323226) 2003 SY_{111}	18 September 2003	list
(323473) 2004 LS_{3}	10 June 2004	list
(323624) 2004 VY_{54}	9 November 2004	list
(323631) 2004 VC_{94}	10 November 2004	list
(323682) 2005 EJ_{324}	10 March 2005	list
(323835) 2005 SK_{58}	26 September 2005	list
(325380) 2008 SQ_{152}	28 September 2008	list
326290 Akhenaten	21 April 1998	list

(326829) 2003 UT_{26}	25 October 2003	list
(326830) 2003 UQ_{27}	16 October 2003	list
(326832) 2003 UY_{46}	21 October 2003	list
(326839) 2003 UB_{80}	17 October 2003	list
(328421) 2008 SA_{238}	29 September 2008	list
(329672) 2003 UF_{27}	23 October 2003	list
(331834) 2003 UC_{47}	21 October 2003	list
(331894) 2004 LZ	8 June 2004	list
(332570) 2008 SN_{12}	24 September 2008	list
(333389) 2002 RS_{181}	13 September 2002	list
(333537) 2005 SC_{180}	29 September 2005	list
(333673) 2008 TG_{29}	1 October 2008	list
(334121) 2001 RR_{2}	9 September 2001	list
(334527) 2002 RG_{189}	13 September 2002	list
(334983) 2004 FD_{29}	27 March 2004	list
(335080) 2004 SN	21 August 2004	list
(335191) 2005 EO	1 March 2005	list
(335248) 2005 LX_{7}	4 June 2005	list
(335851) 2007 QZ_{11}	22 August 2007	list
(336255) 2008 SW_{147}	25 September 2008	list
(336289) 2008 SB_{282}	25 September 2008	list
(337417) 2001 QY_{285}	23 August 2001	list
(337930) 2001 YL_{6}	17 December 2001	list
(338579) 2003 SB_{112}	18 September 2003	list
(339141) 2004 TJ	3 October 2004	list

(339393) 2005 BT_{27}	31 January 2005	list
(339482) 2005 FB_{3}	21 March 2005	list
(339719) 2005 SJ_{9}	25 September 2005	list
(339830) 2005 SS_{259}	25 September 2005	list
(340346) 2006 DL_{63}	25 February 2006	list
(340692) 2006 SN	16 September 2006	list
(341233) 2007 RJ_{162}	13 September 2007	list
(341308) 2007 SN_{1}	18 September 2007	list
(341712) 2007 VF_{188}	11 November 2007	list
(342057) 2008 SE_{2}	20 September 2008	list
(344690) 2003 SK_{312}	27 September 2003	list
(344923) 2004 TB_{12}	7 October 2004	list
(345414) 2006 CZ_{66}	20 November 2004	list
(345908) 2007 RZ_{148}	12 September 2007	list
(346388) 2008 SS_{71}	22 September 2008	list
(346480) 2008 UK_{1}	20 October 2008	list
(348249) 2004 TO_{11}	5 October 2004	list
(348257) 2004 TA_{123}	7 October 2004	list
(349263) 2007 TD_{188}	14 October 2007	list
(349298) 2007 TX_{447}	14 October 2007	list
(349604) 2008 UL_{1}	20 October 2008	list
(350392) 2012 VA_{17}	26 September 2005	list
(351285) 2004 TX_{12}	7 October 2004	list
(352215) 2007 TN_{18}	4 October 2007	list
(354551) 2004 TY_{12}	8 October 2004	list

(354606) 2005 CS_{25}	1 February 2005	list
(355834) 2008 UY_{6}	25 October 2008	list
(356377) 2010 NZ_{81}	28 August 2005	list
(357271) 2002 RE_{137}	12 September 2002	list
(357619) 2005 EZ_{70}	8 March 2005	list
(358445) 2007 DC_{117}	17 February 2007	list
(358974) 2008 SN_{7}	23 September 2008	list
(359334) 2009 QV_{5}	17 August 2009	list
(360200) 1997 UF_{8}	26 October 1997	list
(360220) 1999 TU_{20}	7 October 1999	list
(361990) 2008 RA_{25}	2 September 2008	list
(363507) 2003 UE_{47}	21 October 2003	list
(363509) 2003 UF_{56}	19 October 2003	list
(363976) 2005 UN_{158}	29 October 2005	list
(364625) 2007 TE_{24}	4 October 2007	list
(364731) 2007 VY_{119}	18 September 2007	list
(365896) 2011 WC_{16}	21 August 2006	list
(366636) 2003 SA_{124}	18 September 2003	list
(366826) 2005 GK_{215}	11 April 2005	list
(366903) 2005 UU_{41}	23 October 2005	list
(368583) 2004 QX_{4}	21 August 2004	list
(368618) 2004 TV_{19}	14 October 2004	list
(368722) 2005 UX_{44}	22 October 2005	list
(368897) 2006 SX_{218}	26 September 2006	list
(369272) 2009 QA_{7}	17 August 2009	list

(369610) 2011 CH_{68}	10 September 2004	list
(370693) 2004 HA_{33}	22 April 2004	list
(370785) 2004 SS_{55}	24 September 2004	list
(371991) 2008 GU_{129}	4 April 2008	list
(374118) 2004 TR_{19}	13 October 2004	list
(375375) 2008 SR_{147}	25 September 2008	list
(376615) 2013 PE_{43}	12 October 2004	list
(378501) 2007 TE_{393}	12 October 2007	list
(381006) 2006 UG_{5}	16 October 2006	list
(381486) 2008 SE_{71}	22 September 2008	list
(382057) 2011 ES_{17}	17 February 2004	list
(383068) 2005 RX_{9}	10 September 2005	list
(383868) 2008 RK_{25}	5 September 2008	list
(383919) 2008 SX_{145}	22 September 2008	list
(383997) 2008 UO_{2}	22 October 2008	list
(385866) 2006 RS_{22}	15 September 2006	list
(388460) 2007 DQ_{43}	17 February 2007	list
(391507) 2007 RP_{13}	11 September 2007	list
(391815) 2008 SL_{7}	22 September 2008	list
(391832) 2008 SE_{148}	27 September 2008	list
(393420) 2001 RB_{46}	9 September 2001	list
(393906) 2005 UZ_{1}	22 October 2005	list
(396755) 2003 UJ_{56}	19 October 2003	list
(397805) 2008 RJ_{25}	4 September 2008	list
(399736) 2005 DA_{2}	28 February 2005	list

(400033) 2006 QT_{108}	28 August 2006	list
(402116) 2004 CT_{2}	12 February 2004	list
(402293) 2005 SB_{207}	30 September 2005	list
(402921) 2007 TD_{143}	9 October 2007	list
(405259) 2003 SR_{269}	28 September 2003	list
(409406) 2005 GY_{33}	5 April 2005	list
(410531) 2008 FO_{7}	29 March 2008	list
(413365) 2004 BM_{69}	27 January 2004	list
(417860) 2007 JK_{16}	10 May 2007	list
(417954) 2007 TY_{69}	10 October 2007	list
(423956) 2006 UF_{75}	17 October 2006	list
(427894) 2005 UA_{2}	22 October 2005	list
(431492) 2007 TQ_{70}	12 October 2007	list
(434697) 2006 BS_{207}	31 January 2006	list
(438205) 2005 UO_{158}	30 October 2005	list
(438711) 2008 SG_{7}	22 September 2008	list
(439947) 2001 SQ_{290}	23 September 2001	list
(440480) 2005 TU_{13}	1 October 2005	list
(444495) 2006 RQ_{22}	15 September 2006	list
(447207) 2005 TH_{48}	7 October 2005	list
(447492) 2006 RC_{61}	15 September 2006	list
(450977) 2008 SM_{7}	23 September 2008	list
(455164) 1998 TN	10 October 1998	list
(457894) 2009 TY_{23}	14 October 2009	list
(468419) 1999 TV_{20}	7 October 1999	list

(468514) 2005 RE_{21}	3 September 2005	list
(468594) 2007 TX_{369}	11 October 2007	list
(469636) 2004 SE_{54}	22 September 2004	list
(474673) 2005 CF	1 February 2005	list
(474963) 2005 TZ_{50}	9 October 2005	list
(481075) 2005 ST_{14}	25 September 2005	list
(484647) 2008 TP_{11}	1 October 2008	list
(488477) 1999 TY_{20}	7 October 1999	list
(498750) 2008 UP_{2}	22 October 2008	list
(504532) 2008 SH_{2}	22 September 2008	list
(524704) 2003 UY_{26}	16 October 2003	list
(543370) 2014 BW_{49}	12 October 2007	list
(543738) 2014 OS_{400}	22 October 2006	list
(548225) 2010 EJ_{101}	9 October 2008	list
(549727) 2011 SV_{83}	7 September 2004	list
(550806) 2012 TS_{195}	18 September 2006	list
(553927) 2012 CB_{45}	6 April 2008	list
(554788) 2013 BC_{13}	5 December 2005	list
(558877) 2015 BG_{250}	15 September 2007	list
(559927) 2015 EW_{29}	2 April 2005	list
(572525) 2008 QG_{19}	23 August 2008	list
(572532) 2008 QN_{38}	4 September 2008	list
(572541) 2008 RB_{8}	23 August 2008	list
(572654) 2008 SZ_{156}	5 September 2008	list
(581949) 2015 MX_{63}	12 September 2005	list

(583150) 2016 ET_{172}	9 March 2007	list
(588771) 2008 TQ_{91}	23 September 2008	list
(589224) 2009 QB_{3}	16 August 2009	list
(594240) 2016 NL_{68}	18 September 2007	list
(596986) 2006 QS_{10}	17 August 2006	list
(599920) 2011 BK_{83}	16 January 2005	list
(600864) 2012 RA_{2}	7 October 2004	list
(606732) 2018 VW_{39}	13 September 2004	list
(608232) 2003 SX_{271}	26 September 2003	list
(609305) 2004 XL_{198}	13 November 2004	list
(611069) 2006 RF_{20}	28 August 2006	list
(611073) 2006 RB_{35}	28 August 2006	list
(613656) 2006 VM_{60}	11 November 2006	list
(614052) 2008 SG_{2}	22 September 2008	list
(617325) 2004 RW_{8}	6 September 2004	list
(617327) 2004 RF_{81}	7 September 2004	list
(618926) 2004 TZ_{7}	5 October 2004	list
(619520) 2004 TM_{11}	5 October 2004	list
(624961) 2004 TZ_{236}	8 October 2004	list
(625175) 2005 QS_{154}	28 August 2005	list
(625868) 2006 SW_{411}	28 September 2006	list
(630302) 2005 RB_{26}	31 August 2005	list
(630803) 2006 QJ_{58}	27 August 2006	list
(631373) 2007 DP_{109}	17 February 2007	list
(632541) 2008 QK_{19}	23 August 2008	list

(632555) 2008 RO_{25}	4 September 2008	list
(635522) 2013 TX_{7}	14 September 2004	list
(642318) 2005 QK_{95}	26 February 2004	list
(643856) 2006 SZ_{43}	17 August 2006	list
(645794) 2007 VG_{188}	12 November 2007	list
(647231) 2008 SU_{67}	6 September 2008	list
(648397) 2009 TV_{16}	12 October 2009	list
(653724) 2014 SU_{253}	10 September 2005	list
(657082) 2016 GW_{219}	22 September 2008	list
(661404) 2004 RX_{169}	7 September 2004	list
(661504) 2004 TF_{126}	14 September 2004	list
(661907) 2005 SP_{122}	29 September 2005	list
(661967) 2005 TU_{49}	9 October 2005	list
(663713) 2007 TV_{429}	13 October 2007	list
(664533) 2008 SS_{1}	20 September 2008	list
(666504) 2010 PN_{8}	28 April 2005	list
(670989) 2014 ER_{25}	1 March 2005	list
(671807) 2014 PZ_{29}	9 November 2004	list
(674618) 2015 RM_{43}	7 September 2004	list
(676167) 2016 EF_{2}	6 September 2004	list
(701371) 2004 RA_{362}	22 September 2004	list
(703565) 2007 TB_{59}	15 September 2007	list
(707495) 2011 GU_{13}	7 March 2005	list
(707517) 2011 GF_{59}	29 March 2004	list
(721160) 2003 BC_{23}	10 January 2003	list

(723849) 2007 RP_{6}	3 September 2007	list
(725489) 2008 YG_{66}	10 October 2007	list
(726046) 2009 SB_{21}	16 September 2009	list
(730503) 2012 HV_{82}	27 November 2003	list
(733145) 2014 PU_{55}	24 October 2003	list
(734516) 2015 AM_{264}	27 February 2006	list
(738129) 2016 GH_{199}	2 May 2005	list
(738608) 2016 UM_{142}	18 September 2007	list
(740522) 2003 SW_{309}	18 September 2003	list
(742416) 2007 TP_{22}	8 October 2007	list
(753144) 2015 XO_{12}	9 October 2004	list
(775242) 2006 QF_{131}	21 August 2006	list
(794999) 2007 UW_{95}	19 October 2007	list
(812280) 2004 RT_{62}	7 September 2004	list
(822337) 2015 RH_{81}	9 October 2004	list
(825583) 2018 LY_{17}	14 September 2007	list
(833415) 2010 JN_{126}	8 October 2004	list
(848677) 2004 TL_{135}	20 September 2004	list
(853070) 2008 WM_{158}	21 November 2008	list
(877008) 2009 SW_{16}	22 September 2004	list
Co-discovery made with:^{A} D. J. Tholen^{B} F. Bernardi
