= Jørgen Christensen-Dalsgaard =

Danish astronomer (born 1950)

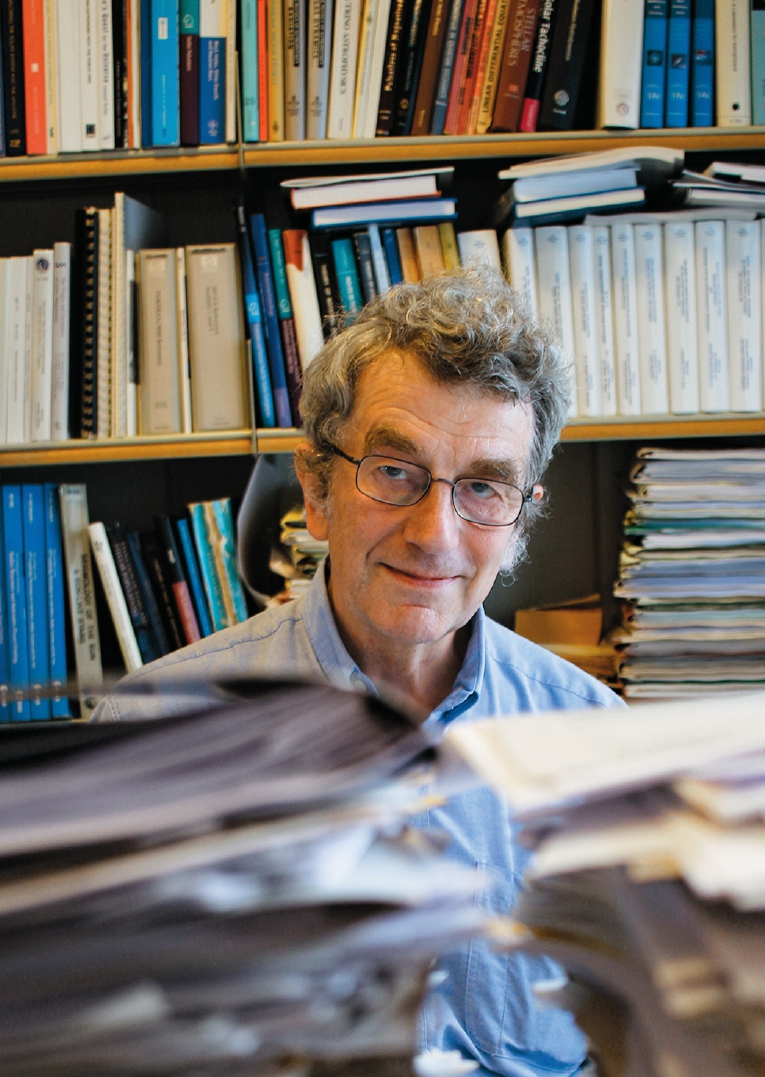
- Christensen-Dalsgaard in his office 2022. Photo by Rasmus Rørbæk, Aarhus University.
- Born: 6 October 1950 (age 75); Kolding, Denmark
- Occupation: Astronomer
- Known for: Asteroseismology, helioseismology
- Website: www.phys.au.dk/~jcd/

Jørgen Christensen-Dalsgaard (born 6 October 1950) is a Danish astronomer at Aarhus University in Denmark. He specializes in asteroseismology and helioseismology. He has made significant contributions to both fields, including predicting the oscillation of Sun-like stars in 1983. He is the head of "Rumudvalget" (the committee of space of the Danish Ministry of Science, Technology and Innovation) and the Stellar Astrophysics Centre (SAC) supported by the Danish National Research Foundation. He is co-investigator on the Kepler mission and, with Hans Kjeldsen in Aarhus, leads the 500+ researchers in the Kepler Asteroseismic Science Consortium (KASC). KASC is responsible for the asteroseismology component of the Kepler mission. Christensen-Dalsgaard has published several papers on this subject. He was also previously the president of Commission 27 of the International Astronomical Union.

He has been featured on Danish television and radio several times and has given many free public lectures on astronomy and asteroseismology.

Christensen-Dalsgaard obtained his PhD from the University of Cambridge in 1978, under the supervision of Douglas Gough.

In 2022 he was awarded the Kavli Prize in Astrophysics and in 2024 the Crafoord Prize in Astronomy.

== Works ==
- Lecture Notes on Stellar Oscillations (only author)
- Bruun, Lone; Pedersen, Kristian, eds. (2010). Dansk astronomi i kikkerten. ISBN 978-87-993384-0-5. Archived from the original on 1 December 2016.
- Thompson, Michael J.; Christensen-Dalsgaard, Jørgen, eds. (2003). Stellar astrophysical fluid dynamics. Cambridge: Cambridge University Press. ISBN 978-0-521-81809-4.
- Aerts, C.; Christensen-Dalsgaard, J.; Kurtz D.W. (2010). Asteroseismology. Berlin: Springer. p. 882. ISBN 978-1-402-05178-4.
- Pijpers, F.P.; Christensen-Dalsgaard, J.; Rosenthal, C.S., eds. (1998). SCORe'96: Solar Convection and Oscillations and their Relationship. Berlin: Springer. p. 324. ISBN 978-0-792-34852-8.
