= Michael H. Ritzwoller =

Michael H. Ritzwoller (born July 29, 1954) is an observational seismologist and professor of physics at University of Colorado Boulder. He is also the director of the Center for Imaging the Earth's Interior at University of Colorado Boulder. His early work was mainly in normal mode seismology and helioseismology. Research in the last decade has concentrated on developing methods to focus seismic models derived from surface wave dispersion information to tectonic scales, particularly in the US and China. Recent emphasis has focused on developing methods for exploiting ambient noise and earthquakes in surface wave tomography and combining this information to produce 3-D models of the crust and uppermost mantle. In addition, he has developed Monte Carlo methods for seismic inversions and has worked on applying physical constraints from geodynamical models and thermodynamics into seismic inversions. He has published numerous articles with an h-index of 50 (updated on 23 August 2015).

== Honors received ==
- Fellow of the American Geophysical Union (2005)
- Gutenberg Lecturer, American Geophysical Union (2013)
