= Garaud =

Garaud is a French surname. Notable people with the surname include:

- Hector Garaud (1897–1940), French World War I flying ace
- Hélène Garaud, French film actor from the 1940s
- Marie-France Garaud (born 1934), French politician
- Pascale Garaud, French astrophysicist
