= 39741 Komm =

Mars-crossing asteroid

Discovery
- Discovered by: R. Tucker
- Discovery site: Goodricke–Pigott Obs.
- Discovery date: 9 January 1997

Designations
- Named after: Rudolf Komm (helioseismologist)
- Alternative designations: 1997 AT_{6} · 1999 LM_{28}
- Minor planet category: Mars crosser

Orbital characteristics
- Epoch 4 September 2017 (JD 2458000.5)
- Uncertainty parameter 0
- Observation arc: 20.15 yr (7,358 days)
- Aphelion: 2.9461 AU
- Perihelion: 1.4189 AU
- Semi-major axis: 2.1825 AU
- Eccentricity: 0.3499
- Orbital period (sidereal): 3.22 yr (1,178 days)
- Mean anomaly: 175.16°
- Mean motion: 0° 18^{m} 20.52^{s} / day
- Inclination: 6.3383°
- Longitude of ascending node: 225.71°
- Argument of perihelion: 126.19°
- Earth MOID: 0.4267 AU

Physical characteristics
- Dimensions: 2.15 km (calculated)
- Synodic rotation period: 5.95±0.01 h
- Geometric albedo: 0.20 (assumed)
- Spectral type: S
- Absolute magnitude (H): 15.7

39741 Komm (provisional designation 1997 AT_{6}) is a stony asteroid and eccentric Mars-crosser from the innermost regions of the asteroid belt, approximately 2 kilometers in diameter. It was discovered on 9 January 1997, by American astronomer Roy Tucker at Goodricke-Pigott Observatory in Tucson, Arizona, United States. The asteroid was named for American helioseismologist Rudolf Komm.

== Orbit and classification ==
Komm orbits the Sun in the inner main-belt at a distance of 1.4–2.9 AU once every 3 years and 3 months (1,178 days). Its orbit has an eccentricity of 0.35 and an inclination of 6° with respect to the ecliptic. As no precoveries were taken, the asteroid's observation arc begins with its official discovery observation.

== Physical characteristics ==
=== Rotation and shape ===
In October 2009, the first and so far only rotational lightcurve of Komm was obtained by French amateur astronomer René Roy. It gave a well-defined rotation period of 5.95±0.01 hours with a high brightness variation of 0.83 magnitude, indicative of a non-spheroidal shape (U=3).

=== Diameter and albedo ===
The Collaborative Asteroid Lightcurve Link assumes a standard albedo for stony asteroids of 0.20 and calculates a diameter of 2.15 kilometers with an absolute magnitude of 15.7.

== Naming ==
This minor planet was named after Rudolf Walter Komm (born 1957), an American helioseismologist, who contributed in the study of solar activity. The official naming citation was published by the Minor Planet Center on 6 August 2003 (M.P.C. 49283).
