= KIC 9970396 =

Eclipsing binary in the constellation Cygnus

- Location of KIC 9970396 (circled)

Observation data Epoch J2000.0 Equinox J2000.0
- Constellation: Cygnus
- Right ascension: 19^{h} 54^{m} 50.35534^{s}
- Declination: +46° 49′ 58.9104″
- Apparent magnitude (V): 11.447

Characteristics
- Evolutionary stage: Red-giant branch + main sequence
- Spectral type: G6V or G9III-IV
- J−H color index: 0.562
- J−K color index: 0.661
- Variable type: Eclipsing binary

Astrometry
Radial velocity (R_{v})	−13.05±4.32 km/s
Proper motion (μ)	RA: 2.097 mas/yr Dec.: −8.260 mas/yr
Parallax (π)	0.991±0.0192 mas
Distance	3,290 ± 60 ly (1,010 ± 20 pc)

Orbit
Primary	KIC 9970396A
Companion	KIC 9970396B
Period (P)	235.29861±0.00024 d
Semi-major axis (a)	0.9669±0.0034 AU
Eccentricity (e)	0.1942±0.0053
Inclination (i)	89.437±0.046°

Details

KIC 9970396A
Mass	1.178±0.015 M_{☉}
Radius	8.035±0.074 R_{☉}
Surface gravity (log g)	2.852±0.199 cgs
Temperature	4868±143 K
Metallicity [Fe/H]	−0.244±0.156 dex
Age	6.13±0.19 Gyr

KIC 9970396B
Mass	1.0030±0.0085 M_{☉}
Radius	1.1089±0.0052 R_{☉}
Surface gravity (log g)	4.3493±0.0054 cgs
Temperature	6221±125 K

Other designations
- Gaia DR3 2085557916175822336, KOI-7606, KIC 9970396, TIC 268059376, TYC 6466-1769-1, 2MASS J19545035+4649589

Database references
SIMBAD	data

KIC 9970396 is an eclipsing binary system located in the northern constellation of Cygnus about 3,290 light-years (1,010 parsecs) distant. The system consists of a red-giant branch star and an F-type main-sequence star. The two stars orbit each other every 235 days (0.64 years) at a mean distance of 207.92±0.73 R_{☉} (0.9669±0.0034 AU), almost the same as Earth's distance from the Sun.

The system was given the Kepler Object of Interest designation KOI-7606 as a planetary candidate, but has been marked a false positive since the dips in the light curve are caused by an eclipsing stellar companion rather than a transiting exoplanet.

== Stellar components ==
=== KIC 9970396A ===
KIC 9970396A is a pulsating red giant currently in the red-giant branch, past the first dredge-up event and approaching the red giant bump. The star displays solar-like oscillations caused by turbulent convection near the surface. Since the star has used up all of its hydrogen within its core, the core now consists mostly of helium, with a mass of 0.229 M_{☉}, that is 19% of the star's entire mass, and a radius of 0.03055 R_{☉}. Its age is estimated at 6.13±0.19 billion years, about 1.5 billion years older than the Solar System (4.568 Gyr).

=== KIC 9970396B ===
KIC 9970396B is a late F-type star almost identical in mass to the Sun but slightly larger and hotter. Its mass is slightly smaller than the red giant primary, thus a possible scenario for the system is that the two stars formed together and the more massive primary star evolved past the main sequence first.

Its stellar parameters, alongside those of the red giant, were precisely measured using a combination of Kepler photometry and spectroscopic observations.
