= Frequency separation =

Separation technique

Frequency separation within astrophysics, is a term used in both helioseismology and asteroseismology. It refers to the spacing in frequency between adjacent modes of oscillation, having the same angular degree (l) but different radial order (n).

For a Sun-like star, the frequency can be further described using the 'large frequency spacing' between modes of different radial order (136 μHz in the Sun), and the 'small frequency spacing' between modes of even and odd angular degree within the same radial order (9.0 μHz in the Sun). The period corresponding to the large frequency spacing can be shown to be approximately the same as the time required for a sound wave to travel to the centre of the Sun and return, confirming the global nature of the oscillations seen.

A further frequency separation, the rotational splitting can be seen in high-resolution solar data between modes of the same angular degree, but different azimuthal order (m). This gives information

Star	Large Frequency Separation	Small Frequency Separation
The Sun	136 μHz	9.0 μHz
Arcturus	0.825 $\pm$ 0.049 μHz	Not Present
