= Pascale Garaud =

French astrophysicist and applied mathematician

Pascale Garaud is a French astrophysicist and applied mathematician interested in fluid dynamics, magnetohydrodynamics, and their applications to astrophysics and geophysics. She is a professor of applied mathematics at the University of California, Santa Cruz, and was department chair from 2023 to 2026.

Garaud was a student at Louis Pasteur University in Strasbourg, and came to Trinity College, Cambridge as a Knox Scholar to study for the Mathematical Tripos. Remaining at Cambridge, Garaud earned her Ph.D. in 2001. Her dissertation, The dynamics of the solar tachocline, was jointly supervised by Douglas Gough and Nigel Weiss. After postdoctoral research at Cambridge, she joined the faculty at the University of California, Santa Cruz in 2004.

At Santa Cruz, Garaud is a Fellow of Oakes College. She founded the Kavli Summer Program in Astrophysics (formerly the International Summer Program for Modeling in Astrophysics), an annual meeting of graduate students and researchers, in 2010.

In 2019, Garaud was elected a fellow of the American Physical Society., and presently serves on the Editorial Committee for the Annual Review of Fluid Mechanics.
