= Birmingham Solar Oscillations Network =

Network of six solar observatories

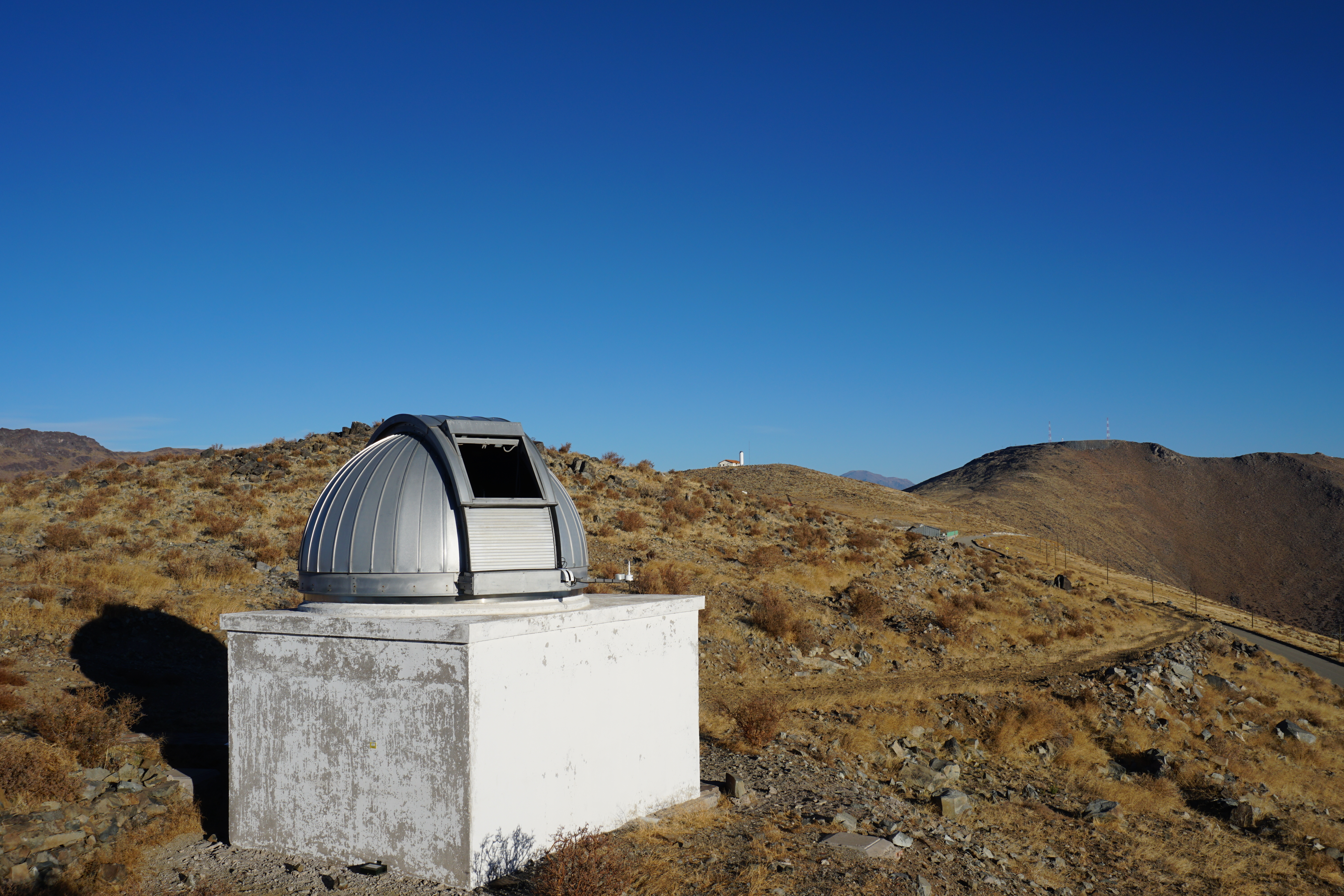
- BiSON telescope at Las Campanas Observatory in Atacama Region, Chile.
- Alternative names: BiSON
- Organization: University of Birmingham
- Telescope style: solar telescope
- Website: bison.ph.bham.ac.uk
- Related media on Commons

The Birmingham Solar Oscillations Network (BiSON) consists of a network of six remote solar observatories monitoring low-degree solar oscillation modes. It is operated by the High Resolution Optical Spectroscopy group of the School of Physics and Astronomy at the University of Birmingham, UK, in collaboration with Sheffield Hallam University, UK. They are funded by the Science and Technology Facilities Council (STFC).

BiSON has been collecting data continuously on solar oscillations since 1976, making it the longest running helioseismology network with data covering three solar cycles.

== Team ==
=== Academic staff ===
- Professor Yvonne Elsworth (Head of project)
- Professor Bill Chaplin

=== Research staff ===
- Anne-Marie Broomhall — Helioseismology
- Andrea Miglio
- Steven Hale

=== Technical staff ===
- Mr Ian Barnes — Electronics
- Mr Barry Jackson — Mechanics

== Remote observatories ==
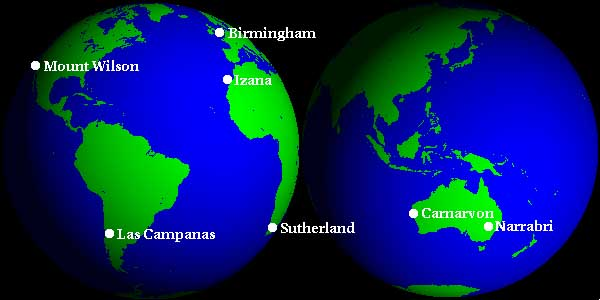
The BiSON stations. The distribution in longitude allows for near-continuous observations of the Sun.

BiSON operates automated resonant scattering spectrometers in astronomical domes or mirror fed systems. The network was established in 1976 with two permanent stations; the addition of several more sites culminated with the addition of a sixth in 1992. The current sites are:

- Mount Wilson Observatory, California, USA
- Las Campanas Observatory, Region IV, Chile
- Observatorio del Teide, Tenerife, Canary Islands, Spain
- South African Astronomical Observatory, Sutherland, South Africa
- OTC Earth Station Carnarvon, Carnarvon, WA, Australia
- Paul Wild Observatory, Narrabri, NSW, Australia

== See also ==
- List of astronomical observatories
- List of astronomical societies
