= Global Oscillations Network Group =

Global network of identical telescopes

Global Oscillation Network Group (GONG)
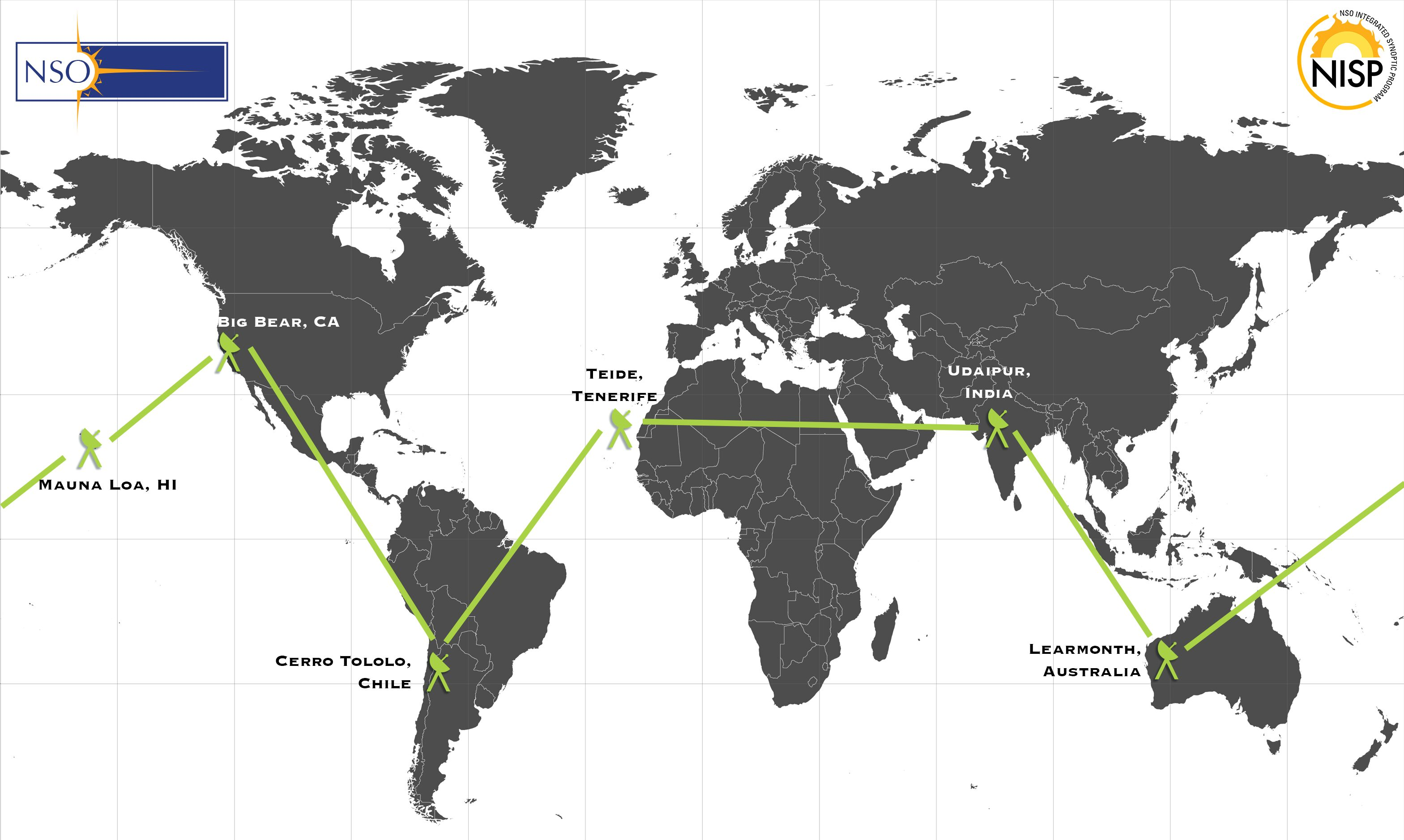
- Map of GONG stations
- Alternative names: Global Oscillation Network Group
- Location: Spain, Australia, United States, India, Chile
- Organization: National Solar Observatory Integrated Synoptic Program (NISP)
- Built: 1995
- Website: gong.nso.edu
- Related media on Commons

The Global Oscillation Network Group (GONG) is a worldwide network of six identical telescopes, designed to have 24/7 observations of the Sun. The network serves multiple purposes, including the provision of operation data for use in space weather prediction, and the study of solar internal structure and dynamics using helioseismology.

Deployed in 1995, GONG is a set of six observing systems geographically distributed around the Earth so that the Sun can be observed as continuously as possible. The six observatories are the Teide Observatory (Canary Islands), the Learmonth Solar Observatory (Western Australia), the Big Bear Solar Observatory (California), the Mauna Loa Observatory (Hawaii), the Udaipur Solar Observatory (India) and the Cerro Tololo Inter-American Observatory (Chile). With these sites, GONG typically can observe the Sun 91% of the time, 24/7. GONG was constructed to provide observations for helioseismology, which aims to understand the solar interior by analyzing the sound waves that are trapped in it. In 2001, the original GONG detectors were upgraded to 1000 x 1000 pixels and continuous magnetograms were implemented, and the new system is known as GONG++. While GONG still provides helioseismology data, it now also provides full-disk solar magnetic field maps (magnetograms) every minute and full-disk images of the Sun in the wavelength of the Hydrogen–α (Hα) spectral line every 20 seconds. These data products are used for research into the solar magnetic field and chromosphere but are also essential inputs into forecasts of space weather. The NOAA Space Weather Prediction Center (SWPC), the US Airforce 557th Weather Wing, and the NASA Community Coordinated Modeling Center (CCMC) all use GONG data to predict space weather conditions. GONG magnetograms are used in modeling of magnetic connectivity between the photosphere and the solar wind and also support NASA's Parker Solar Probe mission.

The GONG Project is managed by the National Solar Observatory (NSO) Integrated Synoptic Program (NISP), which is operated by the Association of Universities for Research in Astronomy under a cooperative agreement with the National Science Foundation (NSF). Additional funding for GONG operations is provided by the National Oceanic and Atmospheric Administration (NOAA) via an interagency agreement with NSF.

GONG has been in operation since 1995 and is aging rapidly. To replace it, NSO is proposing to design and build a next-generation Ground-based solar Observing Network, provisionally named ngGONG. In April 2023, NOAA Science Advisory Board reported on the importance of GONG and its successor data source for space weather operations. It concluded that "GONG provides a vital data source for space weather operations, and it is nearing end of life. The ngGONG project is the most straightforward replacement. It will maintain present operational capabilities, and provide observations for future requirements. The time window to complete ngGONG prior to the demise of GONG is closing." The Board recommended that "NOAA/NWS financially support the design phase for ngGONG, to ensure the initiation of the project."

The Decadal Survey for Solar and Space Physics (Heliophysics) 2024–2033 by the National Academies of Sciences, Engineering, and Medicine recommends ngGONG as NSF's top priority for its Major Research Equipment and Facilities Construction (MREFC) Program. In September 2025, NSF awarded a 3-year project "Mid-scale RI-1 (M1:DA): Design of a Next generation Ground based solar Observing Network (ngGONG-Design)"

== Sites ==
The six GONG stations are located at the geographic coordinates and elevations given in the following table.

Geographical coordinates and elevations of the GONG stations
Observatory	Latitude	Longitude	Elevation
Mauna Loa Observatory	19° 32′ 10.1″ N	155° 34′ 33.3″ W	3471.3 m
Big Bear Solar Observatory	34° 15′ 37.2″ N	116° 55′ 17.1″ W	2063.1 m
Cerro Tololo Inter-American Observatory	30° 10′ 4.2″ S	70° 48′ 19.7″ W	2190.0 m
Teide Observatory	28° 18′ 3.0″ N	16° 30′ 43.0″ W	2425.0 m
Udaipur Solar Observatory	24° 36′ 53.8″ N	73° 40′ 10.9″ E	676.9 m
Learmonth Solar Observatory	22° 13′ 6.6″ S	114° 6′ 9.8″ E	14.7 m

== Gallery ==
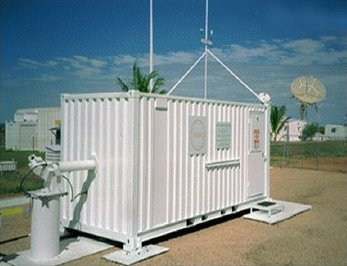
GONG shelter in Learmonth, Australia

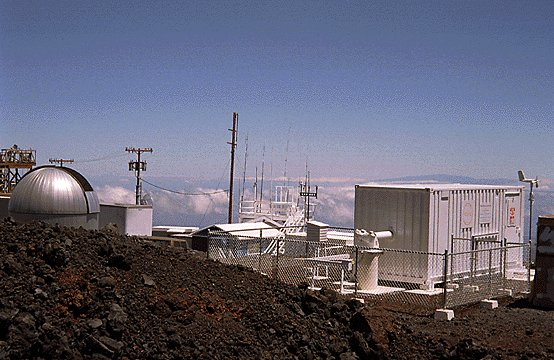
GONG shelter at Mauna Loa, Hawai'i

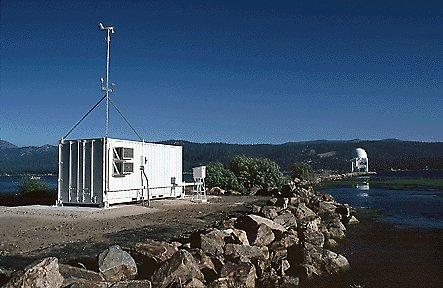
GONG at Big Bear Solar Observatory, California
