= Helioseismology =

Study of the structure and dynamics of the Sun through its oscillation

Helioseismology is the study of the structure and dynamics of the Sun through its oscillations. These are principally caused by sound waves that are continuously driven and damped by convection near the Sun's surface. It is similar to geoseismology, or asteroseismology, which are respectively the studies of the Earth or stars through their oscillations. While the Sun's oscillations were first detected in the early 1960s, it was only in the mid-1970s that it was realized that the oscillations propagated throughout the Sun and could allow scientists to study the Sun's deep interior. The term was coined by Douglas Gough in the 90s. The modern field is separated into global helioseismology, which studies the Sun's resonant modes directly, and local helioseismology, which studies the propagation of the component waves near the Sun's surface.

Helioseismology has contributed to a number of scientific breakthroughs. The most notable was to show that the anomaly in the predicted neutrino flux from the Sun could not be caused by flaws in stellar models and must instead be a problem of particle physics. The so-called solar neutrino problem was ultimately resolved by neutrino oscillations. The experimental discovery of neutrino oscillations was recognized by the 2015 Nobel Prize for Physics. Helioseismology also allowed accurate measurements of the quadrupole (and higher-order) moments of the Sun's gravitational potential, which are consistent with General Relativity. The first helioseismic calculations of the Sun's internal rotation profile showed a rough separation into a rigidly-rotating core and differentially-rotating envelope. The boundary layer is now known as the tachocline and is thought to be a key component for the solar dynamo. Although it roughly coincides with the base of the solar convection zone — also inferred through helioseismology — it is conceptually distinct, being a boundary layer in which there is a meridional flow connected with the convection zone and driven by the interplay between baroclinicity and Maxwell stresses.

Helioseismology benefits most from continuous monitoring of the Sun, which began first with uninterrupted observations from near the South Pole over the austral summer. In addition, observations over multiple solar cycles have allowed helioseismologists to study changes in the Sun's structure over decades. These studies are made possible by global telescope networks like the Global Oscillations Network Group (GONG) and the Birmingham Solar Oscillations Network (BiSON), which have been operating for over several decades.

== Types of solar oscillation ==
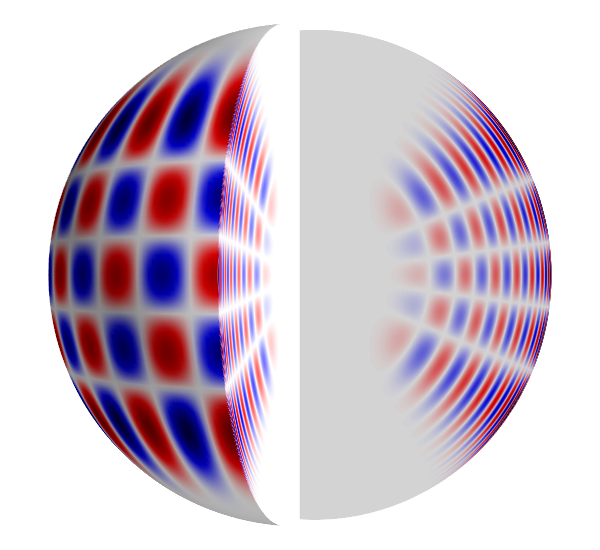
Illustration of a solar pressure mode (p mode) with radial order n=14, angular degree l=20 and azimuthal order m=16. The surface shows the corresponding spherical harmonic. The interior shows the radial displacement computed using a standard solar model. Note that the increase in the speed of sound as waves approach the center of the Sun causes a corresponding increase in the acoustic wavelength.

Solar oscillation modes are interpreted as resonant vibrations of a roughly spherically symmetric self-gravitating fluid in hydrostatic equilibrium. Each mode can then be represented approximately as the product of a function of radius $r$ and a spherical harmonic $Y^m_l(\theta,\phi)$, and consequently can be characterized by the three quantum numbers which label:

- the number of nodal shells in radius, known as the radial order $n$;
- the total number of nodal circles on each spherical shell, known as the angular degree $\ell$; and
- the number of those nodal circles that are longitudinal, known as the azimuthal order $m$.

It can be shown that the oscillations are separated into two categories: interior oscillations and a special category of surface oscillations. More specifically, there are:

=== Pressure modes (p modes) ===
Pressure modes are in essence standing sound waves. The dominant restoring force is the pressure (rather than buoyancy), hence the name. All the solar oscillations that are used for inferences about the interior are p modes, with frequencies between about 1 and 5 millihertz and angular degrees ranging from zero (purely radial motion) to order $10^3$. Broadly speaking, their energy densities vary with radius inversely proportional to the sound speed, so their resonant frequencies are determined predominantly by the outer regions of the Sun. Consequently, it is difficult to infer from them the structure of the solar core.

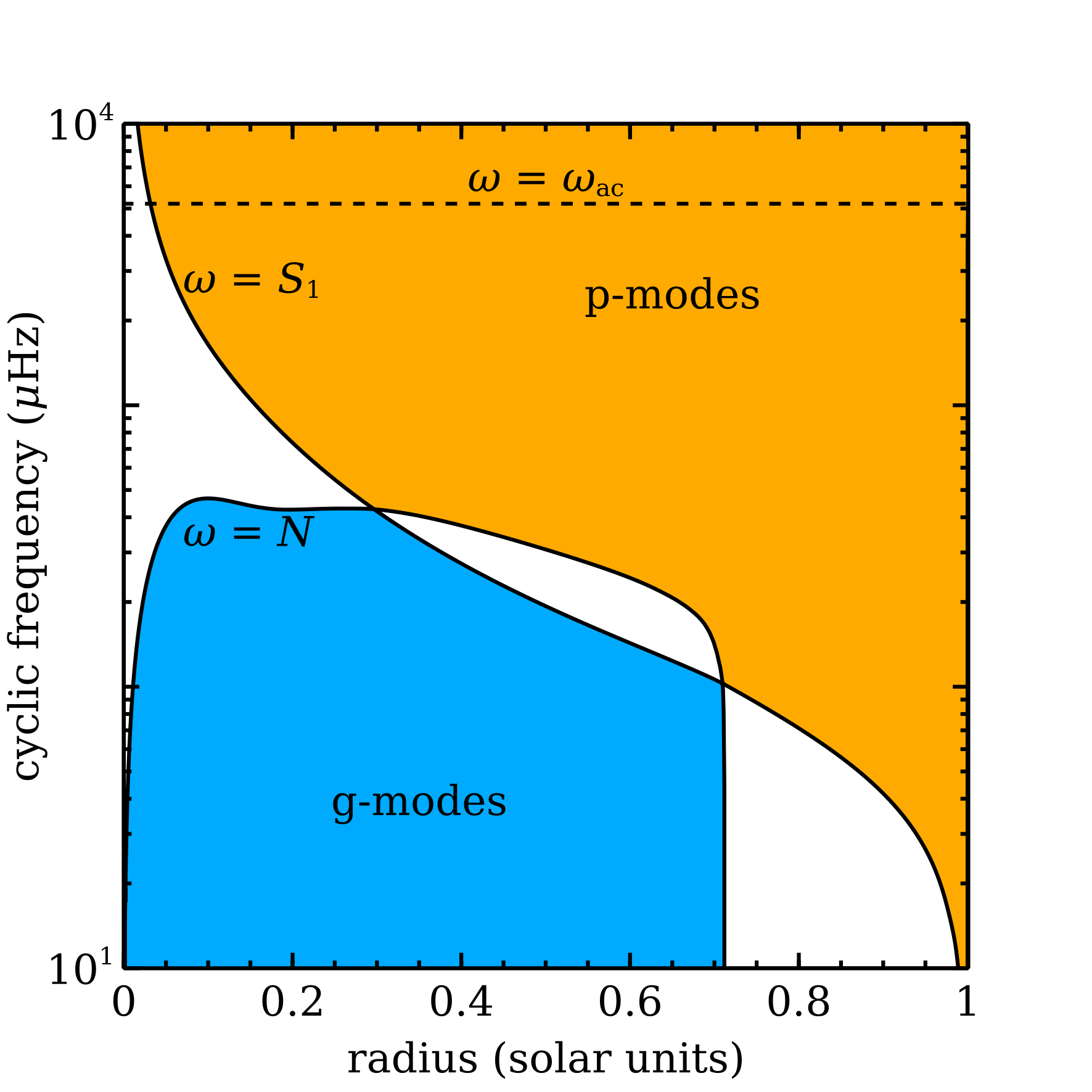
A propagation diagram for a standard solar model showing where oscillations have a g-mode character (blue) or where dipole modes have a p-mode character (orange). The dashed line shows the acoustic cut-off frequency, computed from more precise modelling, and above which modes are not trapped in the star, and roughly-speaking do not resonate.

=== Gravity modes (g modes) ===
Gravity modes are confined to convectively stable regions, either the radiative interior or the atmosphere. The restoring force is predominantly buoyancy, and thus indirectly gravity, from which they take their name. They are evanescent in the convection zone, and therefore interior modes have tiny amplitudes at the surface and are extremely difficult to detect and identify. It has long been recognized that measurement of even just a few g modes could substantially increase our knowledge of the deep interior of the Sun. However, no individual g mode has yet been unambiguously measured, although indirect detections have been both claimed and challenged. Additionally, there can be similar gravity modes confined to the convectively stable atmosphere.

=== Surface gravity modes (f modes) ===
Surface gravity waves are analogous to waves in deep water, having the property that the Lagrangian pressure perturbation is essentially zero. They are of high degree $\ell$, penetrating a characteristic distance $R/\ell$, where $R$ is the solar radius. To good approximation, they obey the so-called deep-water-wave dispersion law: $\omega^2=gk_{\rm h}$, irrespective of the stratification of the Sun, where $\omega$ is the angular frequency, $g$ is the surface gravity and $k_{\rm h} = \ell/R$ is the horizontal wavenumber, and tend asymptotically to that relation as $k_{\rm h} \rightarrow \infty$.

== What seismology can reveal ==
The oscillations that have been successfully utilized for seismology are essentially adiabatic. Their dynamics is therefore the action of pressure forces $p$ (plus putative Maxwell stresses) against matter with inertia density $\rho$, which itself depends upon the relation between them under adiabatic change, usually quantified via the (first) adiabatic exponent $\gamma_1$. The equilibrium values of the variables $p$ and $\rho$ (together with the dynamically small angular velocity $\Omega$ and magnetic field $\rm B$) are related by the constraint of hydrostatic support, which depends upon the total mass $M$ and radius $R$ of the Sun. Evidently, the oscillation frequencies $\omega$ depend only on the seismic variables $\rho(p,\Omega,\rm B)$, $\gamma_1$, $\Omega$ and $\rm B$, or any independent set of functions of them. Consequently, it is only about these variables that information can be derived directly. The square of the adiabatic sound speed, $c^2 = \gamma_1 p/\rho$, is such commonly adopted function, because that is the quantity upon which acoustic propagation principally depends. Properties of other, non-seismic, quantities, such as helium abundance, $Y$, or main-sequence age $t_\odot$, can be inferred only by supplementation with additional assumptions, which renders the outcome more uncertain.

== Data analysis ==
=== Global helioseismology ===
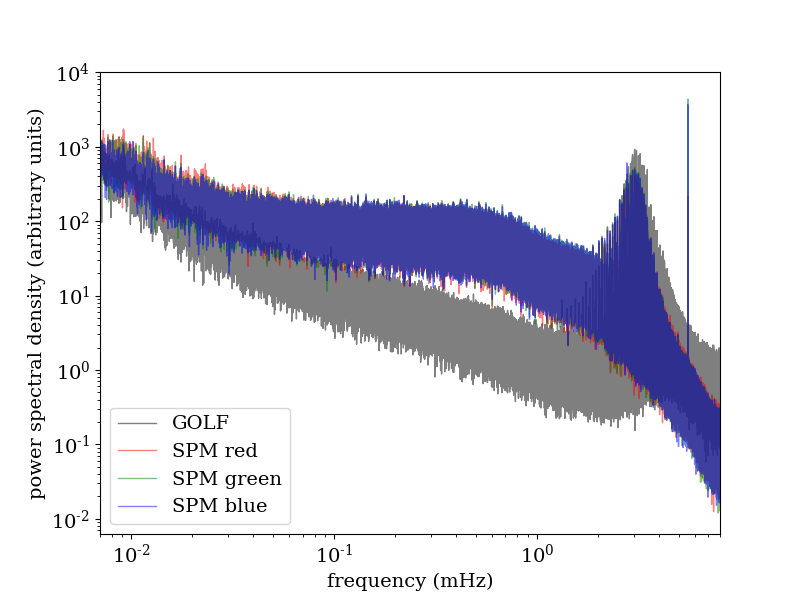
Power spectrum of the Sun using data from instruments aboard the Solar and Heliospheric Observatory on double-logarithmic axes. The three passbands of the VIRGO/SPM instrument show nearly the same power spectrum. The line-of-sight velocity observations from GOLF are less sensitive to the red noise produced by granulation. All the datasets clearly show the oscillation modes around 3mHz.

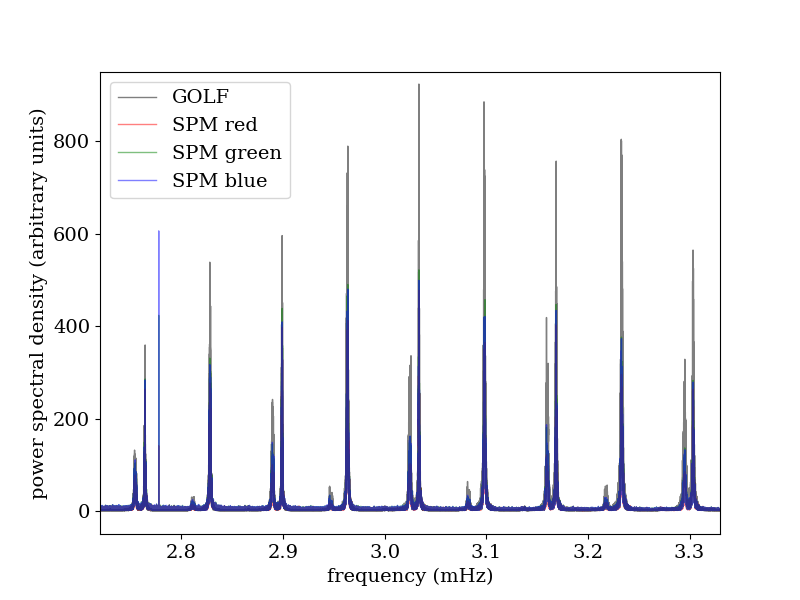
Power spectrum of the Sun around where the modes have maximum power, using data from the GOLF and VIRGO/SPM instruments aboard the Solar and Heliospheric Observatory. The low-degree modes (l<4) show a clear comb-like pattern with a regular spacing.

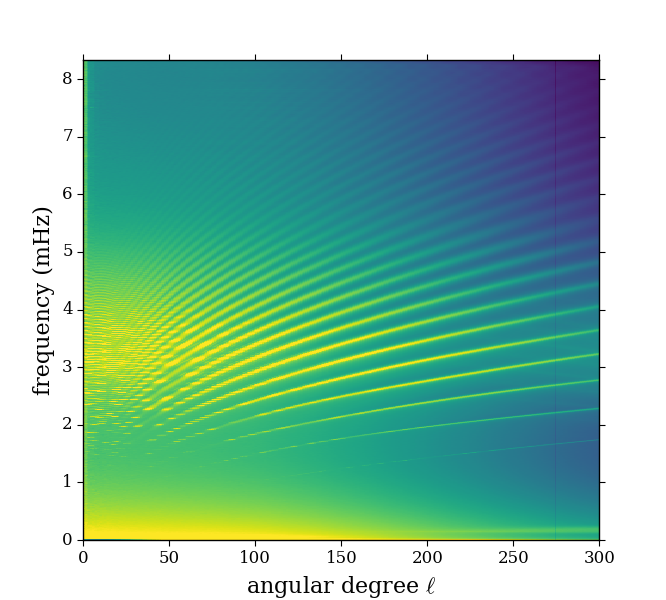
Power spectrum of medium angular degree ($0\leq\ell<300$) solar oscillations, computed for 144 days of data from the MDI instrument aboard SOHO. The colour scale is logarithmic and saturated at one hundredth the maximum power in the signal, to make the modes more visible. The low-frequency region is dominated by the signal of granulation. As the angular degree increases, the individual mode frequencies converge onto clear ridges, each corresponding to a sequence of low-order modes.

The chief tool for analysing the raw seismic data is the Fourier transform. To good approximation, each mode is a damped harmonic oscillator, for which the power as a function of frequency is a Lorentz function. Spatially resolved data are usually projected onto desired spherical harmonics to obtain time series which are then Fourier transformed. Helioseismologists typically combine the resulting one-dimensional power spectra into a two-dimensional spectrum.

The lower frequency range of the oscillations is dominated by the variations caused by granulation. This must first be filtered out before (or at the same time that) the modes are analysed. Granular flows at the solar surface are mostly horizontal, from the centres of the rising granules to the narrow downdrafts between them. Relative to the oscillations, granulation produces a stronger signal in intensity than line-of-sight velocity, so the latter is preferred for helioseismic observatories.

=== Local helioseismology ===
Local helioseismology—a term coined by Charles Lindsey, Doug Braun and Stuart Jefferies in 1993—employs several different analysis methods to make inferences from the observational data.

- The Fourier–Hankel spectral method was originally used to search for wave absorption by sunspots.
- Ring-diagram analysis, first introduced by Frank Hill, is used to infer the speed and direction of horizontal flows below the solar surface by observing the Doppler shifts of ambient acoustic waves from power spectra of solar oscillations computed over patches of the solar surface (typically 15° × 15°). Thus, ring-diagram analysis is a generalization of global helioseismology applied to local areas on the Sun (as opposed to half of the Sun). For example, the sound speed and adiabatic index can be compared within magnetically active and inactive (quiet Sun) regions.
- Time-distance helioseismology aims to measure and interpret the travel times of solar waves between any two locations on the solar surface. Inhomogeneities near the ray path connecting the two locations perturb the travel time between those two points. An inverse problem must then be solved to infer the local structure and dynamics of the solar interior.
- Helioseismic holography, introduced in detail by Charles Lindsey and Doug Braun for the purpose of far-side (magnetic) imaging, is a special case of phase-sensitive holography. The idea is to use the wavefield on the visible disk to learn about active regions on the far side of the Sun. The basic idea in helioseismic holography is that the wavefield, e.g., the line-of-sight Doppler velocity observed at the solar surface, can be used to make an estimate of the wavefield at any location in the solar interior at any instant in time. In this sense, holography is much like seismic migration, a technique in geophysics that has been in use since the 1940s. As another example, this technique has been used to give a seismic image of a solar flare.
- In direct modelling, the idea is to estimate subsurface flows from direct inversion of the frequency-wavenumber correlations seen in the wavefield in the Fourier domain. Woodard demonstrated the ability of the technique to recover near-surface flows the f modes.

== Inversion ==
=== Introduction ===
The Sun's oscillation modes represent a discrete set of observations that are sensitive to its continuous structure. This allows scientists to formulate inverse problems for the Sun's interior structure and dynamics. Given a reference model of the Sun, the differences between its mode frequencies and those of the Sun, if small, are weighted averages of the differences between the Sun's structure and that of the reference model. The frequency differences can then be used to infer those structural differences. The weighting functions of these averages are known as kernels.

=== Structure ===
The first inversions of the Sun's structure were made using Duvall's law and later using Duvall's law linearized about a reference solar model. These results were subsequently supplemented by analyses that linearize the full set of equations describing the stellar oscillations about a theoretical reference model and are now a standard way to invert frequency data. The inversions demonstrated differences in solar models that were greatly reduced by implementing gravitational settling: the gradual separation of heavier elements towards the solar centre (and lighter elements to the surface to replace them).

=== Rotation ===
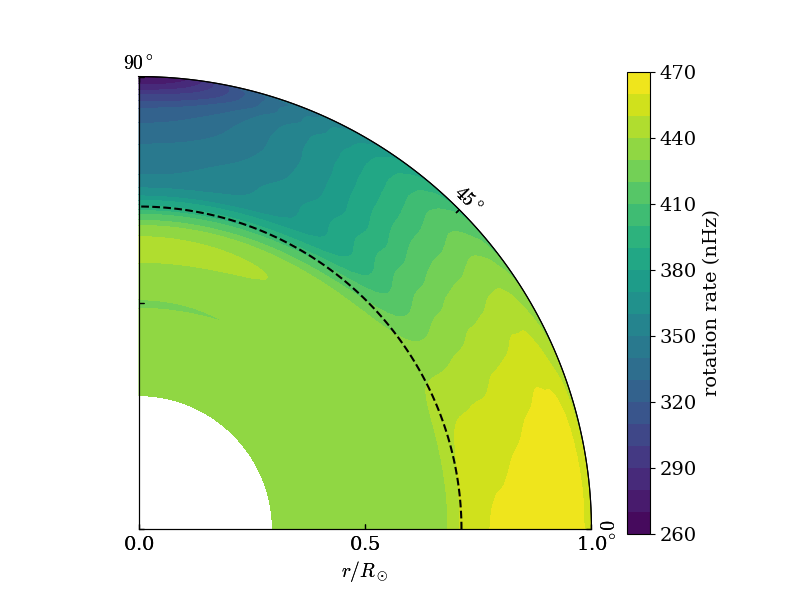
The internal rotation profile of the Sun inferred using data from the Helioseismic and Magnetic Imager aboard the Solar Dynamics Observatory. The inner radius has been truncated where the measurements are less certain than 1%, which happens around 3/4 of the way to the core. The dashed line indicates the base of the solar convection zone, which happens to coincide with the boundary at which the rotation profile changes, known as the tachocline.

If the Sun were perfectly spherical, the modes with different azimuthal orders m would have the same frequencies. Rotation, however, breaks this degeneracy, and the modes frequencies differ by rotational splittings that are weighted-averages of the angular velocity through the Sun. Different modes are sensitive to different parts of the Sun and, given enough data, these differences can be used to infer the rotation rate throughout the Sun. For example, if the Sun were rotating uniformly throughout, all the p modes would be split by approximately the same amount. Actually, the angular velocity is not uniform, as can be seen at the surface, where the equator rotates faster than the poles. The Sun rotates slowly enough that a spherical, non-rotating model is close enough to reality for deriving the rotational kernels.

Helioseismology has shown that the Sun has a rotation profile with several features:

- a rigidly-rotating radiative (i.e. non-convective) zone, though the rotation rate of the inner core is not well known;
- a thin shear layer, known as the tachocline, which separates the rigidly-rotating interior and the differentially-rotating convective envelope;
- a convective envelope in which the rotation rate varies both with depth and latitude; and
- a final shear layer just beneath the surface, in which the rotation rate slows down towards the surface.

== Relationship to other fields ==
=== Geoseismology ===
Helioseismology was born from analogy with geoseismology but several important differences remain. First, the Sun lacks a solid surface and therefore cannot support shear waves. From the data analysis perspective, global helioseismology differs from geoseismology by studying only normal modes. Local helioseismology is thus somewhat closer in spirit to geoseismology in the sense that it studies the complete wavefield.

=== Asteroseismology ===
Because the Sun is a star, helioseismology is closely related to the study of oscillations in other stars, known as asteroseismology. Helioseismology is most closely related to the study of stars whose oscillations are also driven and damped by their outer convection zones, known as solar-like oscillators, but the underlying theory is broadly the same for other classes of variable star.

The principal difference is that oscillations in distant stars cannot be resolved. Because the brighter and darker sectors of the spherical harmonic cancel out, this restricts asteroseismology almost entirely to the study of low degree modes (angular degree $\ell\leq3$). This makes inversion much more difficult but upper limits can still be achieved by making more restrictive assumptions.

== History ==
Solar oscillations were first observed in the early 1960s as a quasi-periodic intensity and line-of-sight velocity variation with a period of about 5 minutes. Scientists gradually realized that the oscillations might be global modes of the Sun and predicted that the modes would form clear ridges in two-dimensional power spectra. The ridges were subsequently confirmed in observations of high-degree modes in the mid-1970s, and mode multiplets of different radial orders were distinguished in whole-disc observations. At a similar time, Jørgen Christensen-Dalsgaard and Douglas Gough suggested the potential of using individual mode frequencies to infer the interior structure of the Sun. They calibrated solar models against the low-degree data finding two similarly good fits, one with low $Y$ and a corresponding low neutrino production rate $L_\nu$, the other with higher $Y$ and $L_\nu$; earlier envelope calibrations against high-degree frequencies preferred the latter, but the results were not wholly convincing. It was not until Tom Duvall and Jack Harvey connected the two extreme data sets by measuring modes of intermediate degree to establish the quantum numbers associated with the earlier observations that the higher-$Y$ model was established, thereby suggesting at that early stage that the resolution of the neutrino problem must lie in nuclear or particle physics.

New methods of inversion developed in the 1980s, allowing researchers to infer the profiles sound speed and, less accurately, density throughout most of the Sun, corroborating the conclusion that residual errors in the inference of the solar structure is not the cause of the neutrino problem. Towards the end of the decade, observations also began to show that the oscillation mode frequencies vary with the Sun's magnetic activity cycle.

To overcome the problem of not being able to observe the Sun at night, several groups had begun to assemble networks of telescopes (e.g. the Birmingham Solar Oscillations Network, or BiSON, and the Global Oscillation Network Group) from which the Sun would always be visible to at least one node. Long, uninterrupted observations brought the field to maturity, and the state of the field was summarized in a 1996 special issue of Science magazine. This coincided with the start of normal operations of the Solar and Heliospheric Observatory (SoHO), which began producing high-quality data for helioseismology.

The subsequent years saw the resolution of the solar neutrino problem, and the long seismic observations began to allow analysis of multiple solar activity cycles. The agreement between standard solar models and helioseismic inversions was disrupted by new measurements of the heavy element content of the solar photosphere based on detailed three-dimensional models. Though the results later shifted back towards the traditional values used in the 1990s, the new abundances significantly worsened the agreement between the models and helioseismic inversions. The discrepancy, known as the solar abundance problem, was restored with a 2022 reanalysis which corrected the amount of heavy elements back to the old value.

Space-based observations by SoHO have continued and SoHO was joined in 2010 by the Solar Dynamics Observatory (SDO), which has also been monitoring the Sun continuously since its operations began. In addition, ground-based networks (notably BiSON and GONG) continue to operate, providing nearly continuous data from the ground too.

== See also ==
- 160-minute solar cycle
- Coronal seismology
- Differential rotation
- Diskoseismology
- Frequency separation
- Magnetogravity wave
- Moreton wave
- Solar neutrino problem
- Solar tower (astronomy)
- Stellar rotation
