= Asteroseismology =

Study of oscillations in stars

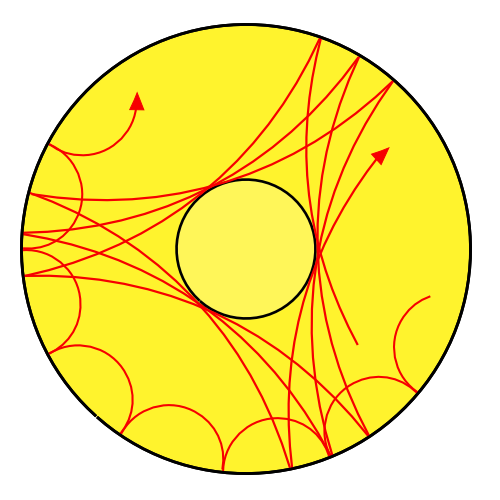
Different oscillation modes have different sensitivities to the structure of a star. By observing multiple modes, one can therefore partially infer a star's internal structure.

Asteroseismology is the study of oscillations in stars. Stars have many resonant modes and frequencies, and the path of sound waves passing through a star depends on the local speed of sound, which in turn depends on local temperature and chemical composition. Because the resulting oscillation modes are sensitive to different parts of the star, they inform astronomers about the internal structure of the star, which is otherwise not directly possible from overall properties like brightness and surface temperature.

Asteroseismology is closely related to helioseismology, the study of stellar pulsation specifically in the Sun. Though both are based on the same underlying physics, more and qualitatively different information is available for the Sun because its surface can be resolved.

== Theoretical background ==
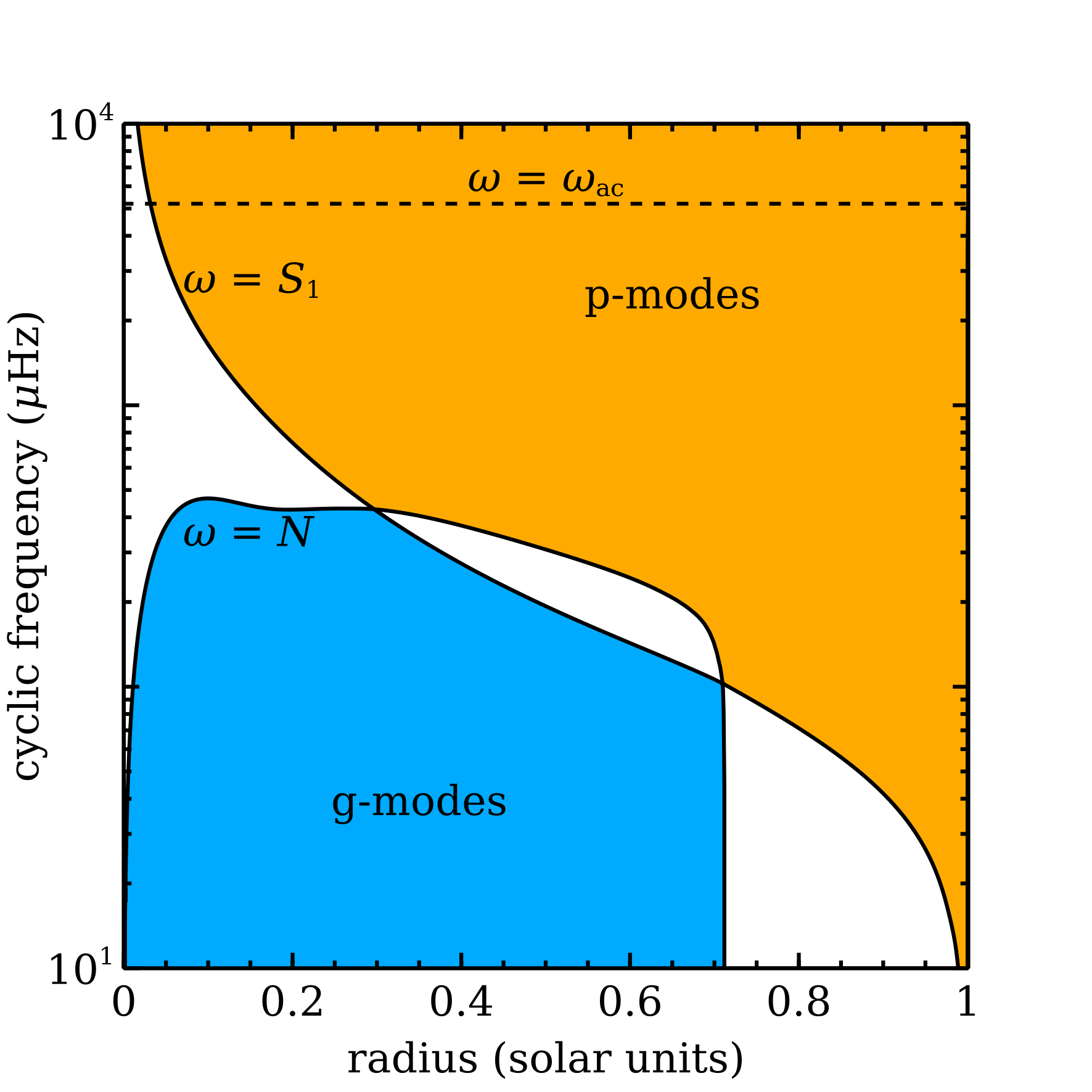
A propagation diagram for a standard solar model showing where oscillations have a g-mode character (blue) or where dipole modes have a p-mode character (orange). Between about 100 and 400 μHz, modes would potentially have two oscillating regions: these are known as mixed modes. The dashed line shows the acoustic cut-off frequency, computed from more precise modelling, and above which modes are not trapped in the star, and roughly speaking do not resonate.

By linearly perturbing the equations defining the mechanical equilibrium of a star (i.e. mass conservation and hydrostatic equilibrium) and assuming that the perturbations are adiabatic, one can derive a system of four differential equations whose solutions give the frequency and structure of a star's modes of oscillation. The stellar structure is usually assumed to be spherically symmetric, so the horizontal (i.e. non-radial) component of the oscillations is described by spherical harmonics, indexed by an angular degree $\ell$ and azimuthal order $m$. In non-rotating stars, modes with the same angular degree must all have the same frequency because there is no preferred axis. The angular degree indicates the number of nodal lines on the stellar surface, so for large values of $\ell$, the opposing sectors roughly cancel out, making it difficult to detect light variations. As a consequence, modes can only be detected up to an angular degree of about 3 in intensity and about 4 if observed in radial velocity.

By additionally assuming that the perturbation to the gravitational potential is negligible (the Cowling approximation) and that the star's structure varies more slowly with radius than the oscillation mode, the equations can be reduced approximately to one second-order equation for the radial component of the displacement eigenfunction $\xi_r(r)$,
$$\frac{d^2\xi_r}{dr^2} = \frac{\omega^2}{c_s^2} \left(1-\frac{N^2}{\omega^2}\right)
\left(\frac{S_\ell^2}{\omega^2} - 1\right)\xi_r$$
where $r$ is the radial co-ordinate in the star, $\omega$ is the angular frequency of the oscillation mode, $c_s$ is the sound speed inside the star, $N$ is the Brunt–Väisälä or buoyancy frequency and $S_\ell$ is the Lamb frequency. The last two are defined by
$$N^2 = g \left(\frac{1}{\Gamma_1 p} \frac{dp}{dr} - \frac{1}{\rho} \frac{d\rho}{dr}\right)$$
and
$$S_\ell^2 = \frac{\ell(\ell+1)c_s^2}{r^2}$$
respectively. By analogy with the behaviour of simple harmonic oscillators, this implies that oscillating solutions exist when the frequency is either greater or less than both $S_\ell$ and $N$. We identify the former case as high-frequency pressure modes (p-modes) and the latter as low-frequency gravity modes (g-modes).

This basic separation allows us to determine (to reasonable accuracy) where we expect what kind of mode to resonate in a star. By plotting the curves $\omega=N$ and $\omega=S_\ell$ (for given $\ell$), we expect p-modes to resonate at frequencies below both curves or frequencies above both curves.

== Excitation mechanisms ==
=== Kappa-mechanism ===
Under fairly specific conditions, some stars have regions where heat is transported by radiation and the opacity is a sharply decreasing function of temperature. This opacity bump can drive oscillations through the $\kappa$-mechanism (or Eddington valve). Suppose that, at the beginning of an oscillation cycle, the stellar envelope has contracted. By expanding and cooling slightly, the layer in the opacity bump becomes more opaque, absorbs more radiation, and heats up. This heating causes expansion, further cooling and the layer becomes even more opaque. This continues until the material opacity stops increasing so rapidly, at which point the radiation trapped in the layer can escape. The star contracts and the cycle prepares to commence again. In this sense, the opacity acts like a valve that traps heat in the star's envelope.

Pulsations driven by the $\kappa$-mechanism are coherent and have relatively large amplitudes. It drives the pulsations in many of the longest-known variable stars, including the Cepheid and RR Lyrae variables.

=== Surface convection ===
In stars with surface convection zones, turbulent fluids motions near the surface simultaneously excite and damp oscillations across a broad range of frequency. Because the modes are intrinsically stable, they have low amplitudes and are relatively short-lived. This is the driving mechanism in all solar-like oscillators.

=== Convective blocking ===
If the base of a surface convection zone is sharp and the convective timescales slower than the pulsation timescales, the convective flows react too slowly to perturbations that can build up into large, coherent pulsations. This mechanism is known as convective blocking and is believed to drive pulsations in the $\gamma$ Doradus variables.

=== Tidal excitation ===
Observations from the Kepler satellite revealed eccentric binary systems in which oscillations are excited during the closest approach. These systems are known as heartbeat stars because of the characteristic shape of the lightcurves.

== Types of oscillators ==
A Hertzsprung–Russell diagram highlighting regions where many classes of pulsating star are found.

=== Solar-like oscillators ===
Because solar oscillations are driven by near-surface convection, any stellar oscillations caused similarly are known as solar-like oscillations and the stars themselves as solar-like oscillators. However, solar-like oscillations also occur in evolved stars (subgiants and red giants), which have convective envelopes, even though the stars are not Sun-like.

=== Cepheid variables ===
Cepheid variables are one of the most important classes of pulsating star. They are core-helium burning stars with masses above about 5 solar masses. They principally oscillate at their fundamental modes, with typical periods ranging from days to months. Their pulsation periods are closely related to their luminosities, so it is possible to determine the distance to a Cepheid by measuring its oscillation period, computing its luminosity, and comparing this to its observed brightness.

Cepheid pulsations are excited by the kappa mechanism acting on the second ionization zone of helium.

=== RR Lyrae variables ===
RR Lyrae stars are similar to Cepheid variables but of lower metallicity (i.e. Population II) and much lower masses (about 0.6 to 0.8 solar). They are core helium-burning giants that oscillate in one or both of their fundamental mode and first overtone. The oscillation is also driven by the kappa mechanism acting through the second ionization of helium. Many RR Lyrae stars, including RR Lyrae itself, show long period amplitude modulations, known as the Blazhko effect.

=== Delta Scuti and Gamma Doradus stars ===
Delta Scuti variables are found roughly where the classical instability strip intersects the main sequence. They are typically A- to early F-type dwarfs and subgiants and the oscillation modes are low-order radial and non-radial pressure modes, with periods ranging from 0.25 to 8 hours and magnitude variations anywhere between. Like Cepheid variables, the oscillations are driven by the kappa mechanism acting on the second ionization of helium.

SX Phoenicis variables are regarded as metal-poor relatives of Delta Scuti variables.

Gamma Doradus variables occur in similar stars to the red end of the Delta Scuti variables, usually of early F-type. The stars show multiple oscillation frequencies between about 0.5 and 3 days, which is much slower than the low-order pressure modes. Gamma Doradus oscillations are generally thought to be high-order gravity modes, excited by convective blocking.

Following results from Kepler, it appears that many Delta Scuti stars also show Gamma Doradus oscillations and are therefore hybrids.

=== Rapidly oscillating Ap (roAp) stars ===
Rapidly oscillating Ap stars have similar parameters to Delta Scuti variables, mostly being A- and F-type, but they are also strongly magnetic and chemically peculiar (hence the p spectral subtype). Their dense mode spectra are understood in terms of the oblique pulsator model: the mode's frequencies are modulated by the magnetic field, which is not necessarily aligned with the star's rotation (as is the case in the Earth). The oscillation modes have frequencies around 1500 μHz and amplitudes of a few mmag.

=== Slowly pulsating B stars and Beta Cephei variables ===
Slowly pulsating B (SPB) stars are B-type stars with oscillation periods of a few days, understood to be high-order gravity modes excited by the kappa mechanism. Beta Cephei variables are slightly hotter (and thus more massive), also have modes excited by the kappa mechanism and additionally oscillate in low-order gravity modes with periods of several hours. Both classes of oscillators contain only slowly rotating stars.

=== Variable subdwarf B stars ===
Subdwarf B (sdB) stars are in essence the cores of core-helium burning giants who have somehow lost most of their hydrogen envelopes, to the extent that there is no hydrogen-burning shell. They have multiple oscillation periods that range between about 1 and 10 minutes and amplitudes anywhere between 0.001 and 0.3 mag in visible light. The oscillations are low-order pressure modes, excited by the kappa mechanism acting on the iron opacity bump.

=== White dwarfs ===
White dwarfs are characterized by spectral type, much like ordinary stars, except that the relationship between spectral type and effective temperature does not correspond in the same way. Thus, white dwarfs are known by types DO, DA and DB. Cooler types are physically possible but the Universe is too young for them to have cooled enough. White dwarfs of all three types are found to pulsate. The pulsators are known as GW Virginis stars (DO variables, sometimes also known as PG 1159 stars), V777 Herculis stars (DB variables) and ZZ Ceti stars (DA variables). All pulsate in low-degree, high-order g-modes. The oscillation periods broadly decrease with effective temperature, ranging from about 30 min down to about 1 minute. GW Virginis and ZZ Ceti stars are thought to be excited by the kappa mechanism; V777 Herculis stars by convective blocking.

== Space missions ==
A number of past, present and future spacecraft have asteroseismology studies as a significant part of their missions (order chronological).

- WIRE – A NASA satellite launched in 1999. A failed large infrared telescope, the two-inch aperture star tracker was used for more than a decade as a bright-star asteroseismology instrument. Re-entered Earth's atmosphere 2011.
- MOST – A Canadian satellite launched in 2003. The first spacecraft dedicated to asteroseismology.
- CoRoT – A French-led ESA planet-finder and asteroseismology satellite launched in 2006.
- Kepler space telescope – A NASA planet-finder spacecraft launched in 2009, repurposed as K2 since the failure of a second reaction wheel prevented the telescope from continuing to monitor the same field.
- BRITE – A constellation of nanosatellites used to study the brightest oscillating stars. First two satellites launched Feb 25, 2013.
- TESS – A NASA planet-finder that will survey bright stars across most of the sky launched in 2018.
- PLATO – A planned ESA mission that will specifically exploit asteroseismology to obtain accurate masses and radii of transiting planets, set to launch in january 2027.

== See also ==
- Frequency separation
- Starquake
- Diskoseismology – The study of oscillation modes in accretion disks
- Seismology – Scientific study of earthquakes and propagation of elastic waves through a planet
- Whole Earth Telescope – International collaboration to observe variable stars

== Software ==
The Variable Star package (in R language) provides the main functions to analyzed patterns on the oscillation modes of variable stars. An UI for experimentation with synthetic data is also provided.
