= List of minor planets: 734001–735000 =

The following is a partial list of minor planets, running from minor-planet number 734001 through 735000, inclusive. The primary data for this and other partial lists is based on JPL's "Small-Body Orbital Elements" and data available from the Minor Planet Center. Critical list information is also provided by the MPC, unless otherwise specified from Lowell Observatory. A detailed description of the table's columns and additional sources are given on the main page including a complete list of every page in this series, and a statistical break-up on the dynamical classification of minor planets.

Also see the summary list of all named bodies in numerical and alphabetical order, and the corresponding naming citations for the number range of this particular list. New namings may only be added to this list after official publication, as the preannouncement of names is condemned by the Working Group for Small Bodies Nomenclature of the International Astronomical Union.

Near-Earth obj.	MBA (inner)	MBA (outer)	Centaur
Mars-crosser	MBA (middle)	Jupiter trojan	Trans-Neptunian obj.
Unclassified

== 734001–734100 ==
Designation			Discovery			Properties		Ref
Permanent	Provisional	Named after	Date	Site	Discoverer(s)	Category	Diam.	Ref
734001	2014 WW_{196}	—	October 15, 2003	Palomar	NEAT	·	3.0 km	MPC · JPL
734002	2014 WT_{197}	—	April 27, 2006	Cerro Tololo	Deep Ecliptic Survey	·	2.1 km	MPC · JPL
734003	2014 WM_{201}	—	November 20, 2014	Mount Lemmon	Mount Lemmon Survey	L5	10 km	MPC · JPL
734004	2014 WL_{203}	—	November 17, 2014	Mount Lemmon	Mount Lemmon Survey	·	1.7 km	MPC · JPL
734005	2014 WL_{205}	—	October 19, 2003	Kitt Peak	Spacewatch	·	2.3 km	MPC · JPL
734006	2014 WJ_{207}	—	November 17, 2014	Mount Lemmon	Mount Lemmon Survey	·	2.5 km	MPC · JPL
734007	2014 WL_{207}	—	November 24, 2009	Kitt Peak	Spacewatch	·	1.6 km	MPC · JPL
734008	2014 WS_{208}	—	March 17, 2005	Kitt Peak	Spacewatch	·	2.3 km	MPC · JPL
734009	2014 WH_{212}	—	October 8, 2008	Mount Lemmon	Mount Lemmon Survey	·	2.7 km	MPC · JPL
734010	2014 WX_{214}	—	March 25, 2006	Mount Lemmon	Mount Lemmon Survey	·	3.0 km	MPC · JPL
734011	2014 WK_{215}	—	January 2, 2011	Mount Lemmon	Mount Lemmon Survey	·	1.4 km	MPC · JPL
734012	2014 WP_{215}	—	September 19, 1998	Kitt Peak	Spacewatch	·	3.0 km	MPC · JPL
734013	2014 WD_{217}	—	April 4, 2010	WISE	WISE	EOS	3.1 km	MPC · JPL
734014	2014 WS_{217}	—	May 9, 2006	Mount Lemmon	Mount Lemmon Survey	·	610 m	MPC · JPL
734015	2014 WE_{219}	—	October 16, 2014	Kitt Peak	Spacewatch	EOS	1.6 km	MPC · JPL
734016	2014 WC_{222}	—	April 3, 2011	Haleakala	Pan-STARRS 1	·	2.4 km	MPC · JPL
734017	2014 WW_{222}	—	March 27, 2007	7300	W. K. Y. Yeung	HOF	2.4 km	MPC · JPL
734018	2014 WP_{226}	—	September 27, 2003	Kitt Peak	Spacewatch	·	1.8 km	MPC · JPL
734019	2014 WL_{227}	—	April 5, 2002	Palomar	NEAT	3:2	6.7 km	MPC · JPL
734020	2014 WF_{233}	—	March 30, 2008	Catalina	CSS	·	1.3 km	MPC · JPL
734021	2014 WK_{234}	—	September 30, 2003	Kitt Peak	Spacewatch	·	1.8 km	MPC · JPL
734022	2014 WY_{234}	—	March 8, 2005	Kitt Peak	Spacewatch	·	4.5 km	MPC · JPL
734023	2014 WU_{235}	—	November 20, 2014	Mount Lemmon	Mount Lemmon Survey	·	2.4 km	MPC · JPL
734024	2014 WG_{238}	—	January 28, 2011	Kitt Peak	Spacewatch	·	2.3 km	MPC · JPL
734025	2014 WZ_{239}	—	November 16, 2014	Mount Lemmon	Mount Lemmon Survey	EOS	1.5 km	MPC · JPL
734026	2014 WN_{240}	—	August 24, 2008	Kitt Peak	Spacewatch	·	2.0 km	MPC · JPL
734027	2014 WM_{241}	—	April 1, 2011	Mount Lemmon	Mount Lemmon Survey	·	2.5 km	MPC · JPL
734028	2014 WA_{242}	—	February 3, 2010	WISE	WISE	·	3.0 km	MPC · JPL
734029	2014 WE_{243}	—	July 10, 2014	Haleakala	Pan-STARRS 1	EUN	1.3 km	MPC · JPL
734030	2014 WP_{247}	—	February 14, 2008	Catalina	CSS	·	1.3 km	MPC · JPL
734031	2014 WC_{248}	—	September 7, 2008	Mount Lemmon	Mount Lemmon Survey	EOS	1.5 km	MPC · JPL
734032	2014 WH_{248}	—	October 18, 2003	Kitt Peak	Spacewatch	·	2.7 km	MPC · JPL
734033	2014 WL_{249}	—	October 29, 2003	Kitt Peak	Spacewatch	·	3.2 km	MPC · JPL
734034	2014 WM_{256}	—	November 21, 2014	Haleakala	Pan-STARRS 1	·	1.7 km	MPC · JPL
734035	2014 WY_{260}	—	November 21, 2014	Haleakala	Pan-STARRS 1	·	2.0 km	MPC · JPL
734036	2014 WZ_{266}	—	April 6, 2011	Mount Lemmon	Mount Lemmon Survey	·	2.1 km	MPC · JPL
734037	2014 WC_{267}	—	November 21, 2014	Haleakala	Pan-STARRS 1	·	1.9 km	MPC · JPL
734038	2014 WS_{269}	—	May 15, 2013	Haleakala	Pan-STARRS 1	·	560 m	MPC · JPL
734039	2014 WQ_{271}	—	March 26, 2007	Kitt Peak	Spacewatch	·	1.8 km	MPC · JPL
734040	2014 WP_{276}	—	April 12, 2000	Kitt Peak	Spacewatch	·	1.1 km	MPC · JPL
734041	2014 WF_{278}	—	April 27, 2006	Cerro Tololo	Deep Ecliptic Survey	·	1.4 km	MPC · JPL
734042	2014 WH_{278}	—	November 21, 2014	Haleakala	Pan-STARRS 1	VER	2.3 km	MPC · JPL
734043	2014 WZ_{279}	—	October 2, 2008	Kitt Peak	Spacewatch	·	3.8 km	MPC · JPL
734044	2014 WE_{280}	—	April 30, 2012	Kitt Peak	Spacewatch	EOS	1.7 km	MPC · JPL
734045	2014 WT_{283}	—	November 21, 2014	Haleakala	Pan-STARRS 1	·	2.1 km	MPC · JPL
734046	2014 WN_{287}	—	November 24, 2003	Palomar	NEAT	·	4.9 km	MPC · JPL
734047	2014 WJ_{288}	—	July 14, 2013	Haleakala	Pan-STARRS 1	EOS	1.5 km	MPC · JPL
734048	2014 WA_{289}	—	March 27, 2010	WISE	WISE	·	2.8 km	MPC · JPL
734049	2014 WD_{290}	—	June 18, 2013	Mount Lemmon	Mount Lemmon Survey	EOS	1.6 km	MPC · JPL
734050	2014 WG_{292}	—	January 17, 2010	Kitt Peak	Spacewatch	·	2.7 km	MPC · JPL
734051	2014 WN_{292}	—	September 3, 2013	Haleakala	Pan-STARRS 1	·	2.4 km	MPC · JPL
734052	2014 WP_{294}	—	January 19, 2005	Kitt Peak	Spacewatch	EOS	1.8 km	MPC · JPL
734053	2014 WC_{296}	—	January 6, 2010	Kitt Peak	Spacewatch	·	2.4 km	MPC · JPL
734054	2014 WL_{300}	—	December 18, 2009	Kitt Peak	Spacewatch	·	2.8 km	MPC · JPL
734055	2014 WN_{300}	—	September 29, 2008	Mount Lemmon	Mount Lemmon Survey	LIX	3.3 km	MPC · JPL
734056	2014 WH_{301}	—	February 28, 2010	WISE	WISE	·	3.0 km	MPC · JPL
734057	2014 WX_{301}	—	January 31, 2006	Kitt Peak	Spacewatch	VER	3.3 km	MPC · JPL
734058	2014 WL_{307}	—	November 22, 2014	Mount Lemmon	Mount Lemmon Survey	EOS	1.5 km	MPC · JPL
734059	2014 WG_{310}	—	March 9, 2006	Kitt Peak	Spacewatch	·	2.6 km	MPC · JPL
734060	2014 WM_{310}	—	March 30, 2010	WISE	WISE	·	2.8 km	MPC · JPL
734061	2014 WS_{313}	—	November 19, 2003	Palomar	NEAT	·	4.7 km	MPC · JPL
734062	2014 WB_{314}	—	October 16, 1995	San Marcello	L. Tesi, A. Boattini	PHO	1.2 km	MPC · JPL
734063	2014 WV_{316}	—	April 19, 2013	Haleakala	Pan-STARRS 1	·	1.0 km	MPC · JPL
734064	2014 WW_{316}	—	December 19, 2003	Kitt Peak	Spacewatch	·	3.2 km	MPC · JPL
734065	2014 WZ_{317}	—	October 1, 2009	Mount Lemmon	Mount Lemmon Survey	NAE	2.3 km	MPC · JPL
734066	2014 WM_{319}	—	March 16, 2007	Mount Lemmon	Mount Lemmon Survey	·	1.9 km	MPC · JPL
734067	2014 WE_{322}	—	April 12, 2002	Palomar	NEAT	·	2.1 km	MPC · JPL
734068	2014 WP_{323}	—	January 26, 2011	Mount Lemmon	Mount Lemmon Survey	·	1.6 km	MPC · JPL
734069	2014 WA_{325}	—	October 29, 2014	Haleakala	Pan-STARRS 1	·	1.7 km	MPC · JPL
734070	2014 WJ_{325}	—	November 23, 2009	Kitt Peak	Spacewatch	EOS	1.4 km	MPC · JPL
734071	2014 WG_{326}	—	September 20, 2003	Palomar	NEAT	·	3.3 km	MPC · JPL
734072	2014 WE_{328}	—	January 8, 2011	Mount Lemmon	Mount Lemmon Survey	·	1.7 km	MPC · JPL
734073	2014 WJ_{330}	—	February 5, 2011	Haleakala	Pan-STARRS 1	·	1.7 km	MPC · JPL
734074	2014 WG_{331}	—	November 8, 2010	Mount Lemmon	Mount Lemmon Survey	·	870 m	MPC · JPL
734075	2014 WK_{331}	—	August 15, 2013	Haleakala	Pan-STARRS 1	·	2.0 km	MPC · JPL
734076	2014 WM_{331}	—	March 1, 2010	WISE	WISE	·	2.2 km	MPC · JPL
734077	2014 WQ_{331}	—	May 11, 2007	Mount Lemmon	Mount Lemmon Survey	EOS	1.7 km	MPC · JPL
734078	2014 WF_{332}	—	September 20, 2014	Haleakala	Pan-STARRS 1	·	2.2 km	MPC · JPL
734079	2014 WL_{332}	—	January 30, 2011	Haleakala	Pan-STARRS 1	·	2.0 km	MPC · JPL
734080	2014 WB_{333}	—	November 22, 2014	Haleakala	Pan-STARRS 1	·	2.3 km	MPC · JPL
734081	2014 WG_{333}	—	February 1, 2010	WISE	WISE	·	2.3 km	MPC · JPL
734082	2014 WX_{333}	—	December 18, 2009	Kitt Peak	Spacewatch	·	3.2 km	MPC · JPL
734083	2014 WG_{334}	—	November 22, 2014	Haleakala	Pan-STARRS 1	V	490 m	MPC · JPL
734084	2014 WQ_{335}	—	November 22, 2014	Haleakala	Pan-STARRS 1	·	2.3 km	MPC · JPL
734085	2014 WQ_{336}	—	November 22, 2014	Haleakala	Pan-STARRS 1	·	1.9 km	MPC · JPL
734086	2014 WG_{337}	—	January 17, 2004	Palomar	NEAT	PHO	2.8 km	MPC · JPL
734087	2014 WX_{338}	—	October 2, 2014	Haleakala	Pan-STARRS 1	·	2.8 km	MPC · JPL
734088	2014 WT_{340}	—	March 4, 2011	Mount Lemmon	Mount Lemmon Survey	·	2.0 km	MPC · JPL
734089	2014 WM_{342}	—	July 4, 2013	Haleakala	Pan-STARRS 1	EOS	1.5 km	MPC · JPL
734090	2014 WU_{342}	—	October 31, 2003	Andrushivka	Andrushivka	EOS	4.2 km	MPC · JPL
734091	2014 WQ_{343}	—	August 31, 2014	Haleakala	Pan-STARRS 1	·	1.7 km	MPC · JPL
734092	2014 WR_{345}	—	March 12, 2011	Mount Lemmon	Mount Lemmon Survey	·	2.6 km	MPC · JPL
734093	2014 WX_{347}	—	June 17, 2010	WISE	WISE	PHO	1.4 km	MPC · JPL
734094	2014 WJ_{348}	—	November 21, 2014	Mount Lemmon	Mount Lemmon Survey	EOS	1.5 km	MPC · JPL
734095	2014 WC_{351}	—	March 6, 2011	Mount Lemmon	Mount Lemmon Survey	·	2.2 km	MPC · JPL
734096	2014 WP_{354}	—	September 17, 2009	Mount Lemmon	Mount Lemmon Survey	ADE	1.8 km	MPC · JPL
734097	2014 WC_{356}	—	October 20, 2007	Kitt Peak	Spacewatch	·	3.9 km	MPC · JPL
734098	2014 WY_{356}	—	October 26, 2014	Mount Lemmon	Mount Lemmon Survey	·	2.3 km	MPC · JPL
734099	2014 WR_{358}	—	February 3, 2012	Haleakala	Pan-STARRS 1	·	800 m	MPC · JPL
734100	2014 WV_{358}	—	February 25, 2011	Mount Lemmon	Mount Lemmon Survey	·	1.6 km	MPC · JPL

== 734101–734200 ==
back to top

Designation			Discovery			Properties		Ref
Permanent	Provisional	Named after	Date	Site	Discoverer(s)	Category	Diam.	Ref
734101	2014 WM_{359}	—	February 7, 2008	Kitt Peak	Spacewatch	·	1.3 km	MPC · JPL
734102	2014 WT_{359}	—	August 23, 2014	Haleakala	Pan-STARRS 1	·	2.4 km	MPC · JPL
734103	2014 WV_{359}	—	January 30, 2011	Mount Lemmon	Mount Lemmon Survey	·	2.7 km	MPC · JPL
734104	2014 WP_{363}	—	June 5, 2011	Zelenchukskaya Stn	T. V. Krjačko, Satovski, B.	H	470 m	MPC · JPL
734105	2014 WV_{364}	—	February 26, 2004	Kitt Peak	Deep Ecliptic Survey	L5	10 km	MPC · JPL
734106	2014 WL_{369}	—	March 12, 2007	Mount Lemmon	Mount Lemmon Survey	L5	10 km	MPC · JPL
734107	2014 WV_{371}	—	September 3, 2008	Kitt Peak	Spacewatch	·	2.2 km	MPC · JPL
734108	2014 WY_{371}	—	October 1, 2008	Mount Lemmon	Mount Lemmon Survey	VER	2.2 km	MPC · JPL
734109	2014 WM_{372}	—	February 15, 2010	WISE	WISE	·	1.7 km	MPC · JPL
734110	2014 WW_{373}	—	December 18, 2009	Mount Lemmon	Mount Lemmon Survey	·	2.3 km	MPC · JPL
734111	2014 WZ_{373}	—	October 25, 2001	Apache Point	SDSS Collaboration	L5	8.5 km	MPC · JPL
734112	2014 WC_{375}	—	October 28, 2008	Kitt Peak	Spacewatch	·	2.9 km	MPC · JPL
734113	2014 WP_{377}	—	October 27, 2003	Anderson Mesa	LONEOS	·	4.6 km	MPC · JPL
734114	2014 WB_{378}	—	July 2, 2013	Haleakala	Pan-STARRS 1	EOS	1.7 km	MPC · JPL
734115	2014 WN_{378}	—	November 22, 2014	Haleakala	Pan-STARRS 1	·	2.4 km	MPC · JPL
734116	2014 WN_{379}	—	November 17, 2014	Kitt Peak	Spacewatch	L5	8.6 km	MPC · JPL
734117	2014 WH_{380}	—	December 15, 2009	Mount Lemmon	Mount Lemmon Survey	·	2.4 km	MPC · JPL
734118	2014 WL_{382}	—	May 16, 2005	Palomar	NEAT	·	5.2 km	MPC · JPL
734119	2014 WD_{386}	—	July 14, 2013	Haleakala	Pan-STARRS 1	·	2.1 km	MPC · JPL
734120	2014 WV_{386}	—	March 16, 2009	Catalina	CSS	3:2	6.5 km	MPC · JPL
734121	2014 WS_{387}	—	November 26, 2009	Kitt Peak	Spacewatch	NAE	1.9 km	MPC · JPL
734122	2014 WT_{387}	—	October 7, 2008	Mount Lemmon	Mount Lemmon Survey	·	2.4 km	MPC · JPL
734123	2014 WS_{388}	—	April 11, 2010	WISE	WISE	·	2.6 km	MPC · JPL
734124	2014 WJ_{390}	—	October 2, 2009	Mount Lemmon	Mount Lemmon Survey	·	3.6 km	MPC · JPL
734125	2014 WO_{393}	—	June 22, 2010	WISE	WISE	LIX	3.3 km	MPC · JPL
734126	2014 WC_{394}	—	March 8, 2010	WISE	WISE	ARM	2.9 km	MPC · JPL
734127	2014 WC_{395}	—	February 23, 2010	WISE	WISE	·	1.7 km	MPC · JPL
734128	2014 WF_{396}	—	February 13, 2010	WISE	WISE	·	1.7 km	MPC · JPL
734129	2014 WN_{396}	—	October 4, 2014	Mount Lemmon	Mount Lemmon Survey	·	2.1 km	MPC · JPL
734130	2014 WC_{397}	—	September 26, 2003	Apache Point	SDSS Collaboration	·	3.0 km	MPC · JPL
734131	2014 WH_{397}	—	September 4, 2007	Mount Lemmon	Mount Lemmon Survey	·	3.8 km	MPC · JPL
734132	2014 WN_{397}	—	March 3, 2010	WISE	WISE	EOS	1.8 km	MPC · JPL
734133	2014 WH_{398}	—	June 18, 2013	Haleakala	Pan-STARRS 1	·	2.0 km	MPC · JPL
734134	2014 WE_{400}	—	February 7, 2002	Palomar	NEAT	·	2.7 km	MPC · JPL
734135	2014 WN_{400}	—	March 31, 2010	WISE	WISE	·	2.8 km	MPC · JPL
734136	2014 WG_{401}	—	November 17, 2014	Haleakala	Pan-STARRS 1	V	460 m	MPC · JPL
734137	2014 WM_{402}	—	November 26, 2014	Kitt Peak	Spacewatch	·	1.3 km	MPC · JPL
734138	2014 WK_{403}	—	September 27, 2008	Mount Lemmon	Mount Lemmon Survey	·	2.6 km	MPC · JPL
734139	2014 WM_{404}	—	October 31, 2010	Mount Lemmon	Mount Lemmon Survey	MAS	570 m	MPC · JPL
734140	2014 WR_{404}	—	November 19, 2014	Mount Lemmon	Mount Lemmon Survey	·	460 m	MPC · JPL
734141	2014 WS_{406}	—	October 20, 2003	Kitt Peak	Spacewatch	EOS	1.9 km	MPC · JPL
734142	2014 WU_{409}	—	July 25, 2010	WISE	WISE	·	1.1 km	MPC · JPL
734143	2014 WG_{410}	—	December 17, 2003	Kitt Peak	Spacewatch	·	2.6 km	MPC · JPL
734144	2014 WR_{410}	—	November 26, 2014	Haleakala	Pan-STARRS 1	·	2.6 km	MPC · JPL
734145	2014 WE_{411}	—	December 22, 2003	Palomar	NEAT	·	6.4 km	MPC · JPL
734146	2014 WW_{411}	—	August 15, 2013	Haleakala	Pan-STARRS 1	·	960 m	MPC · JPL
734147	2014 WL_{412}	—	November 17, 2009	Kitt Peak	Spacewatch	·	2.4 km	MPC · JPL
734148	2014 WB_{413}	—	November 26, 2014	Haleakala	Pan-STARRS 1	·	1.7 km	MPC · JPL
734149	2014 WW_{414}	—	April 14, 2010	WISE	WISE	·	2.6 km	MPC · JPL
734150	2014 WZ_{414}	—	October 4, 2002	Apache Point	SDSS Collaboration	·	1.5 km	MPC · JPL
734151	2014 WS_{415}	—	April 18, 2010	WISE	WISE	·	2.3 km	MPC · JPL
734152	2014 WF_{416}	—	January 7, 2010	Mount Lemmon	Mount Lemmon Survey	·	2.1 km	MPC · JPL
734153	2014 WN_{416}	—	January 17, 2005	Kitt Peak	Spacewatch	·	2.4 km	MPC · JPL
734154	2014 WM_{418}	—	November 27, 2009	Mount Lemmon	Mount Lemmon Survey	·	2.2 km	MPC · JPL
734155	2014 WP_{418}	—	September 27, 2003	Apache Point	SDSS Collaboration	·	2.1 km	MPC · JPL
734156	2014 WK_{419}	—	April 20, 2010	WISE	WISE	·	4.8 km	MPC · JPL
734157	2014 WP_{419}	—	August 9, 2013	Kitt Peak	Spacewatch	·	2.7 km	MPC · JPL
734158	2014 WR_{419}	—	April 15, 1994	Kitt Peak	Spacewatch	·	2.8 km	MPC · JPL
734159	2014 WS_{420}	—	April 12, 2011	Mount Lemmon	Mount Lemmon Survey	·	2.6 km	MPC · JPL
734160	2014 WP_{423}	—	May 23, 2006	Kitt Peak	Spacewatch	·	3.0 km	MPC · JPL
734161	2014 WA_{426}	—	October 21, 2003	Kitt Peak	Spacewatch	·	1.6 km	MPC · JPL
734162	2014 WJ_{426}	—	January 16, 2004	Catalina	CSS	·	3.8 km	MPC · JPL
734163	2014 WB_{428}	—	May 11, 2005	Palomar	NEAT	·	5.3 km	MPC · JPL
734164	2014 WL_{428}	—	February 28, 2006	Catalina	CSS	·	1.8 km	MPC · JPL
734165	2014 WY_{430}	—	October 28, 2014	Kitt Peak	Spacewatch	·	1.9 km	MPC · JPL
734166	2014 WS_{431}	—	April 24, 2010	WISE	WISE	·	3.3 km	MPC · JPL
734167	2014 WP_{432}	—	November 27, 2014	Mount Lemmon	Mount Lemmon Survey	VER	2.4 km	MPC · JPL
734168	2014 WM_{436}	—	November 21, 2014	Mount Lemmon	Mount Lemmon Survey	·	1.7 km	MPC · JPL
734169	2014 WM_{438}	—	March 12, 2010	WISE	WISE	·	2.9 km	MPC · JPL
734170	2014 WN_{441}	—	November 20, 2014	Mount Lemmon	Mount Lemmon Survey	L5	8.3 km	MPC · JPL
734171	2014 WK_{445}	—	August 7, 2013	Kitt Peak	Spacewatch	·	1.7 km	MPC · JPL
734172	2014 WA_{447}	—	December 18, 2003	Socorro	LINEAR	LIX	4.4 km	MPC · JPL
734173	2014 WK_{448}	—	March 10, 2008	Kitt Peak	Spacewatch	·	890 m	MPC · JPL
734174	2014 WQ_{448}	—	January 15, 2004	Kitt Peak	Spacewatch	·	2.1 km	MPC · JPL
734175	2014 WZ_{450}	—	September 22, 2008	Mount Lemmon	Mount Lemmon Survey	·	2.5 km	MPC · JPL
734176	2014 WQ_{452}	—	June 20, 2013	Haleakala	Pan-STARRS 1	EOS	1.6 km	MPC · JPL
734177	2014 WM_{455}	—	February 13, 2004	Kitt Peak	Spacewatch	·	2.6 km	MPC · JPL
734178	2014 WA_{456}	—	October 27, 2014	Haleakala	Pan-STARRS 1	·	3.0 km	MPC · JPL
734179	2014 WX_{462}	—	November 17, 2014	Haleakala	Pan-STARRS 1	·	2.6 km	MPC · JPL
734180	2014 WO_{463}	—	November 17, 2014	Haleakala	Pan-STARRS 1	·	2.0 km	MPC · JPL
734181	2014 WS_{463}	—	February 14, 2005	Kitt Peak	Spacewatch	·	2.3 km	MPC · JPL
734182	2014 WR_{464}	—	September 21, 2003	Kitt Peak	Spacewatch	EOS	1.5 km	MPC · JPL
734183	2014 WW_{464}	—	August 25, 2003	Cerro Tololo	Deep Ecliptic Survey	·	2.0 km	MPC · JPL
734184	2014 WH_{468}	—	February 10, 2004	Palomar	NEAT	·	4.5 km	MPC · JPL
734185	2014 WH_{470}	—	September 20, 2006	Kitt Peak	Spacewatch	·	1.2 km	MPC · JPL
734186	2014 WX_{470}	—	April 13, 2010	WISE	WISE	·	4.1 km	MPC · JPL
734187	2014 WD_{471}	—	November 18, 2014	Kitt Peak	Spacewatch	·	650 m	MPC · JPL
734188	2014 WH_{472}	—	August 24, 2007	Kitt Peak	Spacewatch	·	560 m	MPC · JPL
734189	2014 WA_{474}	—	November 21, 2014	Haleakala	Pan-STARRS 1	L5	7.2 km	MPC · JPL
734190	2014 WN_{474}	—	April 26, 2007	Mount Lemmon	Mount Lemmon Survey	·	2.0 km	MPC · JPL
734191	2014 WG_{477}	—	May 6, 2010	WISE	WISE	·	3.5 km	MPC · JPL
734192	2014 WU_{479}	—	January 2, 2009	Kitt Peak	Spacewatch	LUT	3.6 km	MPC · JPL
734193	2014 WH_{480}	—	June 12, 2010	WISE	WISE	·	3.3 km	MPC · JPL
734194	2014 WU_{480}	—	November 18, 2003	Kitt Peak	Spacewatch	·	2.7 km	MPC · JPL
734195	2014 WK_{482}	—	March 14, 2010	WISE	WISE	·	3.2 km	MPC · JPL
734196	2014 WC_{484}	—	February 14, 2005	Catalina	CSS	·	2.6 km	MPC · JPL
734197	2014 WY_{484}	—	October 4, 2014	Mount Lemmon	Mount Lemmon Survey	EOS	1.7 km	MPC · JPL
734198	2014 WV_{487}	—	June 29, 2010	WISE	WISE	·	1.0 km	MPC · JPL
734199	2014 WV_{489}	—	October 7, 2004	Socorro	LINEAR	·	1.7 km	MPC · JPL
734200	2014 WK_{494}	—	April 4, 2010	Catalina	CSS	·	3.9 km	MPC · JPL

== 734201–734300 ==
back to top

Designation			Discovery			Properties		Ref
Permanent	Provisional	Named after	Date	Site	Discoverer(s)	Category	Diam.	Ref
734201	2014 WM_{494}	—	October 27, 2005	Mount Lemmon	Mount Lemmon Survey	·	1.6 km	MPC · JPL
734202	2014 WN_{494}	—	March 11, 2005	Anderson Mesa	LONEOS	·	3.7 km	MPC · JPL
734203	2014 WC_{495}	—	December 11, 2009	Mount Lemmon	Mount Lemmon Survey	·	1.8 km	MPC · JPL
734204	2014 WW_{495}	—	April 16, 2005	Kitt Peak	Spacewatch	·	3.6 km	MPC · JPL
734205	2014 WU_{498}	—	September 26, 1998	Socorro	LINEAR	·	2.3 km	MPC · JPL
734206	2014 WG_{499}	—	May 13, 2000	Kitt Peak	Spacewatch	·	4.0 km	MPC · JPL
734207	2014 WZ_{500}	—	April 26, 2010	WISE	WISE	·	3.8 km	MPC · JPL
734208	2014 WR_{502}	—	February 13, 2010	Kitt Peak	Spacewatch	·	1.8 km	MPC · JPL
734209	2014 WB_{503}	—	February 28, 2010	WISE	WISE	·	2.1 km	MPC · JPL
734210	2014 WD_{504}	—	November 19, 2003	Palomar	NEAT	PHO	1.6 km	MPC · JPL
734211	2014 WG_{505}	—	May 17, 2010	WISE	WISE	LUT	4.2 km	MPC · JPL
734212	2014 WE_{516}	—	March 11, 2005	Mount Lemmon	Mount Lemmon Survey	VER	2.6 km	MPC · JPL
734213	2014 WO_{516}	—	March 19, 2010	WISE	WISE	·	2.2 km	MPC · JPL
734214	2014 WH_{517}	—	November 30, 2014	Haleakala	Pan-STARRS 1	·	1.1 km	MPC · JPL
734215	2014 WR_{517}	—	March 26, 2011	Haleakala	Pan-STARRS 1	·	3.4 km	MPC · JPL
734216	2014 WB_{518}	—	October 18, 2009	Mount Lemmon	Mount Lemmon Survey	HOF	2.2 km	MPC · JPL
734217	2014 WD_{518}	—	November 17, 2014	Mount Lemmon	Mount Lemmon Survey	·	1.9 km	MPC · JPL
734218	2014 WQ_{518}	—	October 29, 1998	Kitt Peak	Spacewatch	·	2.1 km	MPC · JPL
734219	2014 WN_{519}	—	September 7, 2008	Mount Lemmon	Mount Lemmon Survey	·	1.7 km	MPC · JPL
734220	2014 WT_{519}	—	November 26, 2014	Haleakala	Pan-STARRS 1	·	2.6 km	MPC · JPL
734221	2014 WJ_{521}	—	November 21, 2009	Kitt Peak	Spacewatch	·	2.0 km	MPC · JPL
734222	2014 WH_{522}	—	October 23, 2008	Kitt Peak	Spacewatch	THM	1.5 km	MPC · JPL
734223	2014 WK_{523}	—	September 23, 2008	Kitt Peak	Spacewatch	·	2.2 km	MPC · JPL
734224	2014 WD_{525}	—	May 12, 2012	Mount Lemmon	Mount Lemmon Survey	·	2.6 km	MPC · JPL
734225	2014 WK_{525}	—	November 20, 2014	Haleakala	Pan-STARRS 1	·	3.2 km	MPC · JPL
734226	2014 WL_{525}	—	August 8, 2013	Kitt Peak	Spacewatch	·	1.9 km	MPC · JPL
734227	2014 WO_{525}	—	November 20, 2014	Haleakala	Pan-STARRS 1	·	2.0 km	MPC · JPL
734228	2014 WR_{525}	—	November 20, 2014	Haleakala	Pan-STARRS 1	ARM	3.0 km	MPC · JPL
734229	2014 WG_{526}	—	November 21, 2014	Haleakala	Pan-STARRS 1	·	1.7 km	MPC · JPL
734230	2014 WH_{526}	—	March 30, 2011	Mount Lemmon	Mount Lemmon Survey	HYG	2.1 km	MPC · JPL
734231	2014 WD_{528}	—	October 30, 2008	Catalina	CSS	·	2.5 km	MPC · JPL
734232	2014 WX_{528}	—	November 22, 2014	Haleakala	Pan-STARRS 1	·	2.5 km	MPC · JPL
734233	2014 WA_{531}	—	November 26, 2014	Haleakala	Pan-STARRS 1	·	1.3 km	MPC · JPL
734234	2014 WE_{531}	—	January 11, 2010	Kitt Peak	Spacewatch	VER	2.0 km	MPC · JPL
734235	2014 WO_{536}	—	October 21, 2014	Mount Lemmon	Mount Lemmon Survey	VER	2.1 km	MPC · JPL
734236	2014 WK_{537}	—	April 12, 2010	WISE	WISE	·	2.4 km	MPC · JPL
734237	2014 WJ_{538}	—	April 26, 2010	WISE	WISE	ELF	3.0 km	MPC · JPL
734238	2014 WS_{543}	—	November 3, 2008	Catalina	CSS	LIX	3.9 km	MPC · JPL
734239	2014 WY_{561}	—	April 13, 2010	WISE	WISE	(895)	3.0 km	MPC · JPL
734240	2014 WK_{567}	—	November 29, 2014	Mount Lemmon	Mount Lemmon Survey	DOR	2.0 km	MPC · JPL
734241	2014 WO_{567}	—	November 16, 2014	Mount Lemmon	Mount Lemmon Survey	·	1.9 km	MPC · JPL
734242	2014 WB_{568}	—	November 26, 2014	Haleakala	Pan-STARRS 1	·	1.3 km	MPC · JPL
734243	2014 WN_{572}	—	November 18, 2014	Kitt Peak	Spacewatch	·	2.5 km	MPC · JPL
734244	2014 WO_{572}	—	November 27, 2014	Haleakala	Pan-STARRS 1	VER	2.1 km	MPC · JPL
734245	2014 WD_{574}	—	December 18, 2001	Apache Point	SDSS	L5	9.2 km	MPC · JPL
734246	2014 WG_{575}	—	November 17, 2014	Haleakala	Pan-STARRS 1	·	590 m	MPC · JPL
734247	2014 WT_{580}	—	November 17, 2014	Haleakala	Pan-STARRS 1	·	2.5 km	MPC · JPL
734248	2014 WU_{580}	—	November 28, 2014	Kitt Peak	Spacewatch	·	2.4 km	MPC · JPL
734249	2014 WT_{585}	—	November 27, 2014	Kitt Peak	Spacewatch	·	1.2 km	MPC · JPL
734250	2014 WX_{587}	—	November 20, 2014	Mount Lemmon	Mount Lemmon Survey	EOS	1.7 km	MPC · JPL
734251	2014 WO_{591}	—	November 17, 2014	Haleakala	Pan-STARRS 1	·	1.4 km	MPC · JPL
734252	2014 WS_{591}	—	November 21, 2014	Haleakala	Pan-STARRS 1	L5	6.8 km	MPC · JPL
734253	2014 WW_{594}	—	November 24, 2014	Mount Lemmon	Mount Lemmon Survey	L5	6.2 km	MPC · JPL
734254	2014 WD_{603}	—	November 26, 2014	Haleakala	Pan-STARRS 1	·	2.1 km	MPC · JPL
734255	2014 WF_{612}	—	November 22, 2014	Mount Lemmon	Mount Lemmon Survey	·	2.4 km	MPC · JPL
734256	2014 WE_{613}	—	November 26, 2014	Haleakala	Pan-STARRS 1	·	670 m	MPC · JPL
734257	2014 WH_{613}	—	February 10, 2011	Mount Lemmon	Mount Lemmon Survey	·	1.9 km	MPC · JPL
734258	2014 WE_{615}	—	November 17, 2014	Haleakala	Pan-STARRS 1	VER	2.0 km	MPC · JPL
734259	2014 WN_{615}	—	April 28, 2012	Mount Lemmon	Mount Lemmon Survey	EOS	1.5 km	MPC · JPL
734260	2014 XN	—	November 27, 2014	Mount Lemmon	Mount Lemmon Survey	L5	7.5 km	MPC · JPL
734261	2014 XS	—	October 8, 2008	Catalina	CSS	·	3.0 km	MPC · JPL
734262	2014 XN_{3}	—	July 1, 2003	Haleakala	NEAT	PHO	1.7 km	MPC · JPL
734263	2014 XS_{8}	—	November 26, 2009	Kitt Peak	Spacewatch	EMA	3.0 km	MPC · JPL
734264	2014 XF_{10}	—	March 11, 2010	WISE	WISE	·	2.3 km	MPC · JPL
734265	2014 XR_{12}	—	September 4, 2014	Haleakala	Pan-STARRS 1	·	2.2 km	MPC · JPL
734266	2014 XD_{13}	—	November 17, 2014	Haleakala	Pan-STARRS 1	·	2.4 km	MPC · JPL
734267	2014 XR_{14}	—	September 13, 2004	Kitt Peak	Spacewatch	AGN	990 m	MPC · JPL
734268	2014 XE_{19}	—	September 23, 2008	Kitt Peak	Spacewatch	·	2.1 km	MPC · JPL
734269	2014 XF_{21}	—	October 19, 2014	Kitt Peak	Spacewatch	·	1.8 km	MPC · JPL
734270	2014 XV_{22}	—	October 9, 2008	Mount Lemmon	Mount Lemmon Survey	EOS	1.5 km	MPC · JPL
734271	2014 XY_{23}	—	May 21, 2012	Haleakala	Pan-STARRS 1	ADE	1.9 km	MPC · JPL
734272	2014 XZ_{24}	—	October 8, 2007	Mount Lemmon	Mount Lemmon Survey	V	380 m	MPC · JPL
734273	2014 XQ_{27}	—	April 12, 2010	WISE	WISE	·	2.9 km	MPC · JPL
734274	2014 XE_{28}	—	October 7, 2008	Mount Lemmon	Mount Lemmon Survey	EOS	1.7 km	MPC · JPL
734275	2014 XE_{29}	—	November 27, 2009	Mount Lemmon	Mount Lemmon Survey	·	2.4 km	MPC · JPL
734276	2014 XM_{31}	—	March 18, 2005	Catalina	CSS	·	2.7 km	MPC · JPL
734277	2014 XK_{33}	—	December 18, 2009	Kitt Peak	Spacewatch	·	2.1 km	MPC · JPL
734278	2014 XV_{33}	—	March 7, 2010	WISE	WISE	·	1.5 km	MPC · JPL
734279	2014 XW_{36}	—	October 1, 2008	Catalina	CSS	·	3.1 km	MPC · JPL
734280	2014 XX_{36}	—	May 4, 2005	Catalina	CSS	·	4.6 km	MPC · JPL
734281	2014 XD_{38}	—	May 24, 2010	WISE	WISE	·	3.0 km	MPC · JPL
734282	2014 XQ_{38}	—	January 20, 2010	WISE	WISE	·	1.9 km	MPC · JPL
734283	2014 XW_{38}	—	February 17, 2004	Palomar	NEAT	LIX	3.0 km	MPC · JPL
734284	2014 XC_{39}	—	May 12, 2012	Haleakala	Pan-STARRS 1	·	2.6 km	MPC · JPL
734285	2014 XD_{40}	—	April 26, 2010	WISE	WISE	L5	10 km	MPC · JPL
734286	2014 XC_{41}	—	December 3, 2015	Mount Lemmon	Mount Lemmon Survey	L5	8.3 km	MPC · JPL
734287	2014 XV_{41}	—	February 14, 2005	Catalina	CSS	·	3.4 km	MPC · JPL
734288	2014 XF_{44}	—	October 22, 2008	Kitt Peak	Spacewatch	·	2.7 km	MPC · JPL
734289	2014 XB_{49}	—	December 10, 2014	Mount Lemmon	Mount Lemmon Survey	·	2.0 km	MPC · JPL
734290	2014 XO_{49}	—	December 11, 2014	Mount Lemmon	Mount Lemmon Survey	·	1.9 km	MPC · JPL
734291	2014 YF_{1}	—	September 28, 2008	Mount Lemmon	Mount Lemmon Survey	·	2.6 km	MPC · JPL
734292	2014 YJ_{1}	—	April 14, 2010	WISE	WISE	L5	9.7 km	MPC · JPL
734293	2014 YZ_{1}	—	April 6, 1999	Kitt Peak	Spacewatch	·	2.4 km	MPC · JPL
734294	2014 YD_{2}	—	September 6, 2013	Kitt Peak	Spacewatch	·	2.6 km	MPC · JPL
734295	2014 YF_{3}	—	March 30, 2011	Mount Lemmon	Mount Lemmon Survey	·	2.1 km	MPC · JPL
734296	2014 YZ_{4}	—	September 28, 2003	Apache Point	SDSS Collaboration	·	600 m	MPC · JPL
734297	2014 YS_{5}	—	November 1, 2005	Mount Lemmon	Mount Lemmon Survey	·	2.0 km	MPC · JPL
734298	2014 YL_{8}	—	June 16, 2010	WISE	WISE	·	3.2 km	MPC · JPL
734299	2014 YS_{9}	—	September 22, 2003	Palomar	NEAT	PHO	1.1 km	MPC · JPL
734300	2014 YQ_{11}	—	April 30, 2008	Mount Lemmon	Mount Lemmon Survey	·	1.0 km	MPC · JPL

== 734301–734400 ==
back to top

Designation			Discovery			Properties		Ref
Permanent	Provisional	Named after	Date	Site	Discoverer(s)	Category	Diam.	Ref
734301	2014 YK_{12}	—	November 9, 2008	Mount Lemmon	Mount Lemmon Survey	·	4.0 km	MPC · JPL
734302	2014 YT_{13}	—	December 16, 2003	Kitt Peak	Spacewatch	·	1.4 km	MPC · JPL
734303	2014 YX_{15}	—	May 29, 2010	WISE	WISE	·	3.4 km	MPC · JPL
734304	2014 YP_{16}	—	January 12, 2010	Kitt Peak	Spacewatch	URS	3.6 km	MPC · JPL
734305	2014 YB_{18}	—	December 20, 2014	Haleakala	Pan-STARRS 1	·	2.4 km	MPC · JPL
734306	2014 YP_{20}	—	October 30, 2014	Mount Lemmon	Mount Lemmon Survey	EOS	1.5 km	MPC · JPL
734307	2014 YZ_{20}	—	April 30, 2010	WISE	WISE	·	1.3 km	MPC · JPL
734308	2014 YA_{21}	—	November 26, 2014	Mount Lemmon	Mount Lemmon Survey	EOS	1.3 km	MPC · JPL
734309	2014 YT_{21}	—	May 17, 2010	WISE	WISE	EUP	4.0 km	MPC · JPL
734310	2014 YA_{24}	—	April 26, 2010	WISE	WISE	·	2.7 km	MPC · JPL
734311	2014 YF_{25}	—	May 9, 2000	Kitt Peak	Spacewatch	·	3.0 km	MPC · JPL
734312	2014 YG_{25}	—	October 22, 2008	Kitt Peak	Spacewatch	·	3.6 km	MPC · JPL
734313	2014 YB_{26}	—	October 23, 2008	Črni Vrh	Mikuž, B.	·	5.6 km	MPC · JPL
734314	2014 YR_{26}	—	April 28, 2010	WISE	WISE	·	3.5 km	MPC · JPL
734315	2014 YX_{27}	—	December 24, 2014	Mount Lemmon	Mount Lemmon Survey	EOS	1.5 km	MPC · JPL
734316	2014 YH_{28}	—	January 4, 2011	Mount Lemmon	Mount Lemmon Survey	·	1.3 km	MPC · JPL
734317	2014 YT_{30}	—	February 17, 2004	Kitt Peak	Spacewatch	THB	2.5 km	MPC · JPL
734318	2014 YA_{31}	—	October 30, 2008	Kitt Peak	Spacewatch	·	2.5 km	MPC · JPL
734319	2014 YW_{31}	—	September 28, 2008	Mount Lemmon	Mount Lemmon Survey	·	3.9 km	MPC · JPL
734320	2014 YC_{32}	—	February 13, 2004	Kitt Peak	Spacewatch	·	2.9 km	MPC · JPL
734321	2014 YS_{33}	—	December 3, 2008	Mount Lemmon	Mount Lemmon Survey	·	3.9 km	MPC · JPL
734322	2014 YT_{35}	—	April 18, 2010	WISE	WISE	·	2.8 km	MPC · JPL
734323	2014 YY_{35}	—	November 18, 2007	Kitt Peak	Spacewatch	·	720 m	MPC · JPL
734324	2014 YA_{38}	—	May 13, 2010	WISE	WISE	·	3.4 km	MPC · JPL
734325	2014 YZ_{39}	—	October 24, 2009	Mount Lemmon	Mount Lemmon Survey	URS	3.9 km	MPC · JPL
734326	2014 YG_{41}	—	April 10, 2002	Terskol	Terskol	·	2.6 km	MPC · JPL
734327	2014 YR_{42}	—	July 14, 2013	Haleakala	Pan-STARRS 1	EOS	1.5 km	MPC · JPL
734328	2014 YA_{45}	—	May 19, 2010	WISE	WISE	·	4.1 km	MPC · JPL
734329	2014 YK_{46}	—	June 14, 2005	Mount Lemmon	Mount Lemmon Survey	·	4.7 km	MPC · JPL
734330	2014 YC_{47}	—	May 25, 2010	WISE	WISE	·	3.7 km	MPC · JPL
734331	2014 YG_{47}	—	February 14, 2010	WISE	WISE	·	4.6 km	MPC · JPL
734332	2014 YH_{48}	—	October 2, 2011	Magdalena Ridge	Ryan, W. H., Ryan, E. V.	H	670 m	MPC · JPL
734333	2014 YO_{55}	—	February 8, 2008	Mount Lemmon	Mount Lemmon Survey	·	760 m	MPC · JPL
734334	2014 YZ_{55}	—	December 21, 2014	Haleakala	Pan-STARRS 1	·	1.5 km	MPC · JPL
734335	2014 YE_{56}	—	October 7, 2008	Mount Lemmon	Mount Lemmon Survey	·	2.3 km	MPC · JPL
734336	2014 YU_{56}	—	December 19, 2009	Mount Lemmon	Mount Lemmon Survey	·	1.7 km	MPC · JPL
734337	2014 YS_{58}	—	October 11, 2013	Nogales	M. Schwartz, P. R. Holvorcem	·	2.6 km	MPC · JPL
734338	2014 YB_{61}	—	September 20, 2007	Kitt Peak	Spacewatch	·	2.6 km	MPC · JPL
734339	2014 YP_{62}	—	October 1, 2013	Calar Alto-CASADO	Mottola, S., Proffe, G.	·	1.9 km	MPC · JPL
734340	2014 YL_{63}	—	November 21, 2001	Apache Point	SDSS Collaboration	MAR	930 m	MPC · JPL
734341	2014 YW_{64}	—	May 10, 2010	WISE	WISE	·	2.0 km	MPC · JPL
734342	2014 YW_{65}	—	June 9, 2010	WISE	WISE	·	3.2 km	MPC · JPL
734343	2014 YC_{75}	—	December 26, 2014	Haleakala	Pan-STARRS 1	·	1.3 km	MPC · JPL
734344	2014 YD_{75}	—	December 29, 2014	Mount Lemmon	Mount Lemmon Survey	·	2.3 km	MPC · JPL
734345	2014 YC_{77}	—	December 20, 2014	Haleakala	Pan-STARRS 1	GAL	1.7 km	MPC · JPL
734346	2014 YE_{77}	—	December 29, 2014	Haleakala	Pan-STARRS 1	·	1.4 km	MPC · JPL
734347	2014 YK_{80}	—	December 21, 2014	Mount Lemmon	Mount Lemmon Survey	·	3.1 km	MPC · JPL
734348	2014 YR_{83}	—	December 21, 2014	Haleakala	Pan-STARRS 1	·	1.5 km	MPC · JPL
734349	2014 YS_{86}	—	December 26, 2014	Haleakala	Pan-STARRS 1	EOS	1.7 km	MPC · JPL
734350	2014 YU_{86}	—	December 24, 2014	Mount Lemmon	Mount Lemmon Survey	·	2.6 km	MPC · JPL
734351	2014 YB_{89}	—	December 21, 2014	Mount Lemmon	Mount Lemmon Survey	EOS	1.4 km	MPC · JPL
734352	2014 YH_{94}	—	December 26, 2014	Haleakala	Pan-STARRS 1	·	1.6 km	MPC · JPL
734353	2014 YM_{95}	—	December 26, 2014	Haleakala	Pan-STARRS 1	·	870 m	MPC · JPL
734354	2015 AY_{1}	—	November 11, 2001	Apache Point	SDSS Collaboration	L5	6.8 km	MPC · JPL
734355	2015 AD_{2}	—	January 9, 2015	Haleakala	Pan-STARRS 1	L5	6.7 km	MPC · JPL
734356	2015 AD_{3}	—	September 18, 2014	Haleakala	Pan-STARRS 1	·	2.6 km	MPC · JPL
734357	2015 AX_{3}	—	January 11, 2015	Cerro Paranal	Altmann, M., Prusti, T.	·	580 m	MPC · JPL
734358	2015 AX_{4}	—	February 25, 2010	WISE	WISE	·	1.7 km	MPC · JPL
734359	2015 AE_{5}	—	March 7, 2010	WISE	WISE	·	3.1 km	MPC · JPL
734360	2015 AO_{5}	—	February 4, 2010	WISE	WISE	·	2.0 km	MPC · JPL
734361	2015 AX_{5}	—	May 12, 2010	WISE	WISE	LUT	4.6 km	MPC · JPL
734362	2015 AS_{6}	—	April 2, 2006	Kitt Peak	Spacewatch	·	3.2 km	MPC · JPL
734363	2015 AV_{6}	—	April 4, 2005	Mount Lemmon	Mount Lemmon Survey	·	3.0 km	MPC · JPL
734364	2015 AP_{7}	—	April 29, 2010	WISE	WISE	·	2.9 km	MPC · JPL
734365	2015 AG_{8}	—	March 27, 2010	WISE	WISE	·	3.0 km	MPC · JPL
734366	2015 AA_{10}	—	January 11, 2015	Haleakala	Pan-STARRS 1	·	2.3 km	MPC · JPL
734367	2015 AH_{10}	—	September 9, 2013	Haleakala	Pan-STARRS 1	EOS	1.6 km	MPC · JPL
734368	2015 AR_{11}	—	October 27, 2008	Kitt Peak	Spacewatch	·	3.2 km	MPC · JPL
734369	2015 AE_{13}	—	May 25, 2010	WISE	WISE	·	3.3 km	MPC · JPL
734370	2015 AJ_{14}	—	October 13, 2013	Mount Lemmon	Mount Lemmon Survey	·	2.4 km	MPC · JPL
734371	2015 AA_{16}	—	January 16, 2011	Mount Lemmon	Mount Lemmon Survey	·	1.8 km	MPC · JPL
734372	2015 AF_{16}	—	May 14, 2010	WISE	WISE	·	2.9 km	MPC · JPL
734373	2015 AH_{18}	—	February 15, 2010	Mount Lemmon	Mount Lemmon Survey	·	2.4 km	MPC · JPL
734374	2015 AU_{19}	—	December 31, 2002	Socorro	LINEAR	·	4.0 km	MPC · JPL
734375	2015 AX_{20}	—	March 21, 2009	Kitt Peak	Spacewatch	·	540 m	MPC · JPL
734376	2015 AC_{21}	—	April 11, 2011	Mount Lemmon	Mount Lemmon Survey	·	2.7 km	MPC · JPL
734377	2015 AU_{21}	—	October 31, 2007	Catalina	CSS	·	670 m	MPC · JPL
734378	2015 AM_{22}	—	April 16, 2010	WISE	WISE	·	3.3 km	MPC · JPL
734379	2015 AK_{23}	—	January 12, 2011	Mount Lemmon	Mount Lemmon Survey	·	1.7 km	MPC · JPL
734380	2015 AM_{23}	—	December 16, 2014	Haleakala	Pan-STARRS 1	·	2.7 km	MPC · JPL
734381	2015 AO_{24}	—	November 20, 2014	Haleakala	Pan-STARRS 1	·	2.7 km	MPC · JPL
734382	2015 AK_{26}	—	April 11, 2005	Kitt Peak	Spacewatch	·	2.9 km	MPC · JPL
734383	2015 AN_{26}	—	January 12, 2010	Catalina	CSS	·	2.5 km	MPC · JPL
734384	2015 AD_{27}	—	November 20, 2003	Kitt Peak	Spacewatch	·	2.7 km	MPC · JPL
734385	2015 AP_{27}	—	October 26, 2008	Kitt Peak	Spacewatch	THM	2.2 km	MPC · JPL
734386	2015 AN_{28}	—	December 29, 2014	Mount Lemmon	Mount Lemmon Survey	·	1.2 km	MPC · JPL
734387	2015 AA_{29}	—	January 28, 2004	Kitt Peak	Spacewatch	·	2.3 km	MPC · JPL
734388	2015 AH_{30}	—	August 13, 2012	Haleakala	Pan-STARRS 1	·	2.4 km	MPC · JPL
734389	2015 AH_{31}	—	October 24, 2009	Mount Lemmon	Mount Lemmon Survey	·	2.1 km	MPC · JPL
734390	2015 AW_{36}	—	December 21, 2014	Haleakala	Pan-STARRS 1	·	2.7 km	MPC · JPL
734391	2015 AK_{40}	—	September 30, 2005	Mount Lemmon	Mount Lemmon Survey	·	1.1 km	MPC · JPL
734392	2015 AS_{40}	—	February 12, 2008	Mount Lemmon	Mount Lemmon Survey	·	1.2 km	MPC · JPL
734393	2015 AD_{48}	—	March 8, 2010	WISE	WISE	·	3.3 km	MPC · JPL
734394	2015 AR_{48}	—	March 8, 2010	WISE	WISE	·	4.3 km	MPC · JPL
734395	2015 AC_{54}	—	January 30, 2008	Mount Lemmon	Mount Lemmon Survey	·	710 m	MPC · JPL
734396	2015 AL_{54}	—	December 16, 2007	Kitt Peak	Spacewatch	·	470 m	MPC · JPL
734397	2015 AY_{55}	—	February 8, 2008	Mount Lemmon	Mount Lemmon Survey	·	1.1 km	MPC · JPL
734398	2015 AU_{57}	—	May 29, 2006	Kitt Peak	Spacewatch	·	2.4 km	MPC · JPL
734399	2015 AR_{60}	—	March 8, 2005	Kitt Peak	Spacewatch	·	570 m	MPC · JPL
734400	2015 AE_{61}	—	December 19, 2009	Mount Lemmon	Mount Lemmon Survey	·	2.7 km	MPC · JPL

== 734401–734500 ==
back to top

Designation			Discovery			Properties		Ref
Permanent	Provisional	Named after	Date	Site	Discoverer(s)	Category	Diam.	Ref
734401	2015 AW_{62}	—	March 15, 2007	Mount Lemmon	Mount Lemmon Survey	PAD	1.7 km	MPC · JPL
734402	2015 AG_{63}	—	October 15, 2001	Apache Point	SDSS Collaboration	·	3.9 km	MPC · JPL
734403	2015 AL_{74}	—	October 24, 2005	Mauna Kea	A. Boattini	·	3.6 km	MPC · JPL
734404	2015 AM_{77}	—	January 13, 2015	Haleakala	Pan-STARRS 1	·	2.3 km	MPC · JPL
734405	2015 AR_{77}	—	April 4, 2005	Catalina	CSS	·	2.9 km	MPC · JPL
734406	2015 AO_{79}	—	November 11, 2002	Kitt Peak	Spacewatch	·	2.6 km	MPC · JPL
734407	2015 AN_{81}	—	May 24, 2006	Mount Lemmon	Mount Lemmon Survey	·	2.9 km	MPC · JPL
734408	2015 AB_{83}	—	October 3, 2013	Mount Lemmon	Mount Lemmon Survey	·	2.6 km	MPC · JPL
734409	2015 AK_{86}	—	May 15, 2010	WISE	WISE	·	2.7 km	MPC · JPL
734410	2015 AG_{87}	—	January 13, 2015	Haleakala	Pan-STARRS 1	·	450 m	MPC · JPL
734411	2015 AX_{87}	—	January 13, 2015	Haleakala	Pan-STARRS 1	·	2.2 km	MPC · JPL
734412	2015 AR_{88}	—	June 11, 2013	Mount Lemmon	Mount Lemmon Survey	·	890 m	MPC · JPL
734413	2015 AT_{88}	—	December 11, 2004	Bergisch Gladbach	W. Bickel	·	3.9 km	MPC · JPL
734414	2015 AY_{90}	—	February 9, 2008	Kitt Peak	Spacewatch	·	1.0 km	MPC · JPL
734415	2015 AM_{94}	—	February 13, 2010	Catalina	CSS	LUT	4.6 km	MPC · JPL
734416	2015 AB_{96}	—	September 9, 2013	Haleakala	Pan-STARRS 1	LUT	3.0 km	MPC · JPL
734417	2015 AY_{96}	—	April 11, 2010	Mount Lemmon	Mount Lemmon Survey	·	2.9 km	MPC · JPL
734418	2015 AP_{103}	—	December 21, 2014	Mount Lemmon	Mount Lemmon Survey	THM	1.9 km	MPC · JPL
734419	2015 AO_{107}	—	January 19, 2004	Kitt Peak	Spacewatch	·	2.6 km	MPC · JPL
734420	2015 AO_{108}	—	October 19, 2006	Kitt Peak	Deep Ecliptic Survey	·	2.8 km	MPC · JPL
734421	2015 AC_{109}	—	October 27, 2008	Kitt Peak	Spacewatch	·	3.5 km	MPC · JPL
734422	2015 AS_{110}	—	February 10, 2008	Kitt Peak	Spacewatch	·	800 m	MPC · JPL
734423	2015 AO_{111}	—	November 7, 2005	Mauna Kea	A. Boattini	HOF	2.3 km	MPC · JPL
734424	2015 AX_{111}	—	December 21, 2008	Kitt Peak	Spacewatch	·	2.7 km	MPC · JPL
734425	2015 AJ_{113}	—	October 22, 2003	Apache Point	SDSS Collaboration	·	1.6 km	MPC · JPL
734426	2015 AQ_{113}	—	December 21, 2014	Mount Lemmon	Mount Lemmon Survey	EMA	2.6 km	MPC · JPL
734427	2015 AO_{116}	—	January 17, 2004	Kitt Peak	Spacewatch	·	4.8 km	MPC · JPL
734428	2015 AC_{122}	—	March 16, 2010	Mount Lemmon	Mount Lemmon Survey	·	3.8 km	MPC · JPL
734429	2015 AM_{124}	—	October 8, 2008	Mount Lemmon	Mount Lemmon Survey	·	1.5 km	MPC · JPL
734430	2015 AM_{125}	—	September 19, 2007	Kitt Peak	Spacewatch	·	1.5 km	MPC · JPL
734431	2015 AW_{125}	—	April 24, 2012	Haleakala	Pan-STARRS 1	·	980 m	MPC · JPL
734432	2015 AS_{126}	—	April 17, 2005	Kitt Peak	Spacewatch	·	2.7 km	MPC · JPL
734433	2015 AA_{128}	—	June 14, 2010	WISE	WISE	·	3.6 km	MPC · JPL
734434	2015 AL_{130}	—	October 1, 2003	Anderson Mesa	LONEOS	·	680 m	MPC · JPL
734435	2015 AC_{134}	—	January 14, 2015	Haleakala	Pan-STARRS 1	·	860 m	MPC · JPL
734436	2015 AC_{136}	—	January 23, 2011	Mount Lemmon	Mount Lemmon Survey	·	700 m	MPC · JPL
734437	2015 AA_{139}	—	August 28, 2009	Kitt Peak	Spacewatch	·	780 m	MPC · JPL
734438	2015 AS_{139}	—	December 21, 2014	Haleakala	Pan-STARRS 1	·	1.5 km	MPC · JPL
734439	2015 AN_{142}	—	March 27, 2012	Mount Lemmon	Mount Lemmon Survey	·	820 m	MPC · JPL
734440	2015 AQ_{142}	—	October 7, 2013	Catalina	CSS	VER	2.6 km	MPC · JPL
734441	2015 AV_{144}	—	February 9, 2008	Kitt Peak	Spacewatch	·	1 km	MPC · JPL
734442	2015 AV_{147}	—	November 2, 2010	Mount Lemmon	Mount Lemmon Survey	MAS	530 m	MPC · JPL
734443	2015 AH_{150}	—	December 29, 2008	Kitt Peak	Spacewatch	VER	2.7 km	MPC · JPL
734444	2015 AS_{157}	—	September 9, 2007	Kitt Peak	Spacewatch	·	2.1 km	MPC · JPL
734445	2015 AW_{157}	—	January 14, 2015	Haleakala	Pan-STARRS 1	·	570 m	MPC · JPL
734446	2015 AY_{157}	—	January 14, 2015	Haleakala	Pan-STARRS 1	·	2.5 km	MPC · JPL
734447	2015 AB_{158}	—	January 30, 2006	Kitt Peak	Spacewatch	·	1.4 km	MPC · JPL
734448	2015 AU_{159}	—	October 12, 2007	Kitt Peak	Spacewatch	THM	2.1 km	MPC · JPL
734449	2015 AY_{162}	—	December 31, 2007	Mount Lemmon	Mount Lemmon Survey	V	530 m	MPC · JPL
734450	2015 AZ_{166}	—	September 19, 2006	Kitt Peak	Spacewatch	·	760 m	MPC · JPL
734451	2015 AC_{168}	—	March 11, 2005	Kitt Peak	Spacewatch	·	2.6 km	MPC · JPL
734452	2015 AV_{169}	—	August 14, 2012	Kitt Peak	Spacewatch	·	2.4 km	MPC · JPL
734453	2015 AU_{172}	—	March 26, 2008	Mount Lemmon	Mount Lemmon Survey	·	970 m	MPC · JPL
734454	2015 AX_{175}	—	April 11, 2005	Mount Lemmon	Mount Lemmon Survey	·	1 km	MPC · JPL
734455	2015 AM_{179}	—	August 10, 2007	Kitt Peak	Spacewatch	·	2.0 km	MPC · JPL
734456	2015 AW_{181}	—	June 12, 2010	WISE	WISE	·	3.3 km	MPC · JPL
734457	2015 AZ_{181}	—	February 13, 2011	Mount Lemmon	Mount Lemmon Survey	·	810 m	MPC · JPL
734458	2015 AO_{190}	—	February 13, 2008	Mount Lemmon	Mount Lemmon Survey	NYS	900 m	MPC · JPL
734459	2015 AQ_{191}	—	February 8, 2008	Mount Lemmon	Mount Lemmon Survey	·	770 m	MPC · JPL
734460	2015 AK_{192}	—	April 29, 2010	WISE	WISE	·	1.6 km	MPC · JPL
734461	2015 AH_{194}	—	January 14, 2015	Haleakala	Pan-STARRS 1	·	1.3 km	MPC · JPL
734462	2015 AH_{196}	—	October 9, 2005	Kitt Peak	Spacewatch	·	1.0 km	MPC · JPL
734463	2015 AV_{199}	—	December 24, 2014	Mount Lemmon	Mount Lemmon Survey	EOS	1.7 km	MPC · JPL
734464	2015 AS_{200}	—	March 9, 2011	Mount Lemmon	Mount Lemmon Survey	·	1.7 km	MPC · JPL
734465	2015 AR_{202}	—	August 12, 2012	Siding Spring	SSS	LIX	3.9 km	MPC · JPL
734466	2015 AK_{204}	—	October 31, 2010	Mount Lemmon	Mount Lemmon Survey	·	690 m	MPC · JPL
734467	2015 AB_{205}	—	October 3, 2013	Mount Lemmon	Mount Lemmon Survey	·	2.5 km	MPC · JPL
734468	2015 AP_{205}	—	April 22, 2012	Kitt Peak	Spacewatch	·	2.1 km	MPC · JPL
734469	2015 AL_{206}	—	June 4, 2006	Mount Lemmon	Mount Lemmon Survey	·	1.8 km	MPC · JPL
734470	2015 AO_{206}	—	January 1, 2009	Mount Lemmon	Mount Lemmon Survey	·	3.3 km	MPC · JPL
734471	2015 AW_{209}	—	February 10, 2011	Mount Lemmon	Mount Lemmon Survey	(5)	1.1 km	MPC · JPL
734472	2015 AQ_{210}	—	January 15, 2015	Haleakala	Pan-STARRS 1	·	2.8 km	MPC · JPL
734473	2015 AZ_{210}	—	April 1, 2010	WISE	WISE	·	3.8 km	MPC · JPL
734474	2015 AD_{211}	—	November 20, 2014	Haleakala	Pan-STARRS 1	ADE	1.4 km	MPC · JPL
734475	2015 AT_{211}	—	August 9, 2013	Kitt Peak	Spacewatch	·	1.9 km	MPC · JPL
734476	2015 AW_{214}	—	April 1, 2003	Apache Point	SDSS Collaboration	EUN	1.1 km	MPC · JPL
734477	2015 AO_{215}	—	April 4, 2005	Mount Lemmon	Mount Lemmon Survey	·	2.2 km	MPC · JPL
734478	2015 AC_{217}	—	June 1, 2010	WISE	WISE	·	3.1 km	MPC · JPL
734479	2015 AD_{217}	—	January 7, 2010	Kitt Peak	Spacewatch	·	3.5 km	MPC · JPL
734480	2015 AE_{220}	—	April 25, 2010	WISE	WISE	EUP	4.0 km	MPC · JPL
734481	2015 AF_{220}	—	April 15, 2010	WISE	WISE	ELF	3.7 km	MPC · JPL
734482	2015 AW_{220}	—	February 14, 2010	Mount Lemmon	Mount Lemmon Survey	·	2.4 km	MPC · JPL
734483	2015 AR_{221}	—	April 10, 2010	WISE	WISE	·	3.8 km	MPC · JPL
734484	2015 AG_{222}	—	January 15, 2015	Mount Lemmon	Mount Lemmon Survey	·	1.1 km	MPC · JPL
734485	2015 AT_{222}	—	September 13, 2007	Mount Lemmon	Mount Lemmon Survey	·	2.9 km	MPC · JPL
734486	2015 AG_{224}	—	January 15, 2015	Haleakala	Pan-STARRS 1	ELF	2.7 km	MPC · JPL
734487	2015 AP_{225}	—	September 13, 2007	Mount Lemmon	Mount Lemmon Survey	VER	2.2 km	MPC · JPL
734488	2015 AA_{227}	—	June 18, 2010	WISE	WISE	·	4.1 km	MPC · JPL
734489	2015 AA_{229}	—	August 24, 2012	Kitt Peak	Spacewatch	·	2.6 km	MPC · JPL
734490	2015 AA_{230}	—	December 21, 2008	Mount Lemmon	Mount Lemmon Survey	(1118)	2.6 km	MPC · JPL
734491	2015 AX_{231}	—	February 13, 2008	Mount Lemmon	Mount Lemmon Survey	·	900 m	MPC · JPL
734492	2015 AC_{232}	—	June 22, 2006	Kitt Peak	Spacewatch	·	640 m	MPC · JPL
734493	2015 AV_{233}	—	May 24, 2010	WISE	WISE	·	2.6 km	MPC · JPL
734494	2015 AM_{235}	—	June 1, 2010	WISE	WISE	·	2.6 km	MPC · JPL
734495	2015 AS_{235}	—	January 15, 2015	Haleakala	Pan-STARRS 1	·	2.4 km	MPC · JPL
734496	2015 AT_{235}	—	January 15, 2015	Haleakala	Pan-STARRS 1	·	2.7 km	MPC · JPL
734497	2015 AF_{236}	—	November 2, 2013	Kitt Peak	Spacewatch	VER	2.2 km	MPC · JPL
734498	2015 AV_{244}	—	April 13, 2010	Catalina	CSS	·	3.5 km	MPC · JPL
734499	2015 AF_{246}	—	December 18, 2004	Mount Lemmon	Mount Lemmon Survey	EOS	1.5 km	MPC · JPL
734500	2015 AU_{246}	—	April 1, 2010	WISE	WISE	·	3.8 km	MPC · JPL

== 734501–734600 ==
back to top

Designation			Discovery			Properties		Ref
Permanent	Provisional	Named after	Date	Site	Discoverer(s)	Category	Diam.	Ref
734501	2015 AY_{247}	—	January 13, 2015	Haleakala	Pan-STARRS 1	TIR	2.5 km	MPC · JPL
734502	2015 AJ_{249}	—	October 21, 2006	Mount Lemmon	Mount Lemmon Survey	·	840 m	MPC · JPL
734503	2015 AF_{250}	—	March 11, 2000	Kitt Peak	Spacewatch	·	3.7 km	MPC · JPL
734504	2015 AF_{252}	—	January 14, 2015	Haleakala	Pan-STARRS 1	·	1.3 km	MPC · JPL
734505	2015 AN_{252}	—	December 21, 2014	Haleakala	Pan-STARRS 1	·	2.4 km	MPC · JPL
734506	2015 AO_{252}	—	December 26, 2005	Kitt Peak	Spacewatch	·	2.7 km	MPC · JPL
734507	2015 AQ_{257}	—	January 15, 2015	Mount Lemmon	Mount Lemmon Survey	·	2.9 km	MPC · JPL
734508	2015 AE_{258}	—	May 31, 2010	WISE	WISE	·	2.5 km	MPC · JPL
734509	2015 AS_{258}	—	May 9, 2006	Mount Lemmon	Mount Lemmon Survey	VER	3.0 km	MPC · JPL
734510	2015 AG_{259}	—	December 1, 2003	Kitt Peak	Spacewatch	EOS	2.0 km	MPC · JPL
734511	2015 AP_{260}	—	May 15, 2010	WISE	WISE	EOS	1.9 km	MPC · JPL
734512	2015 AY_{260}	—	March 2, 1995	Kitt Peak	Spacewatch	·	1.3 km	MPC · JPL
734513	2015 AA_{262}	—	October 8, 2012	Haleakala	Pan-STARRS 1	·	3.9 km	MPC · JPL
734514	2015 AD_{263}	—	February 12, 2004	Kitt Peak	Spacewatch	·	2.8 km	MPC · JPL
734515	2015 AP_{263}	—	March 19, 2004	Palomar	NEAT	·	3.3 km	MPC · JPL
734516	2015 AM_{264}	—	February 27, 2006	Goodricke-Pigott	R. A. Tucker	·	3.0 km	MPC · JPL
734517	2015 AW_{265}	—	October 2, 2006	Mount Lemmon	Mount Lemmon Survey	·	800 m	MPC · JPL
734518	2015 AZ_{267}	—	November 24, 2009	Kitt Peak	Spacewatch	·	1.5 km	MPC · JPL
734519	2015 AS_{273}	—	January 14, 2015	Haleakala	Pan-STARRS 1	·	870 m	MPC · JPL
734520	2015 AT_{275}	—	January 7, 2010	Kitt Peak	Spacewatch	EOS	1.5 km	MPC · JPL
734521	2015 AW_{275}	—	September 14, 2007	Mauna Kea	P. A. Wiegert	ARM	3.8 km	MPC · JPL
734522	2015 AC_{277}	—	February 13, 2004	Anderson Mesa	LONEOS	·	1.0 km	MPC · JPL
734523	2015 AB_{279}	—	May 29, 2010	WISE	WISE	·	3.1 km	MPC · JPL
734524	2015 AD_{283}	—	February 15, 2004	Palomar	NEAT	·	3.2 km	MPC · JPL
734525	2015 AP_{284}	—	February 14, 2004	Kitt Peak	Spacewatch	THM	2.3 km	MPC · JPL
734526	2015 AW_{284}	—	June 27, 2010	WISE	WISE	·	4.2 km	MPC · JPL
734527	2015 AR_{286}	—	November 30, 2008	Kitt Peak	Spacewatch	·	3.8 km	MPC · JPL
734528	2015 AB_{288}	—	June 5, 2010	WISE	WISE	·	3.2 km	MPC · JPL
734529	2015 AY_{288}	—	July 13, 2001	Palomar	NEAT	·	2.4 km	MPC · JPL
734530	2015 AC_{290}	—	August 22, 1995	Kitt Peak	Spacewatch	V	540 m	MPC · JPL
734531	2015 AR_{290}	—	December 16, 2014	Haleakala	Pan-STARRS 1	EOS	1.4 km	MPC · JPL
734532	2015 AV_{290}	—	January 14, 2015	Haleakala	Pan-STARRS 1	·	860 m	MPC · JPL
734533	2015 AB_{292}	—	September 12, 2007	Mount Lemmon	Mount Lemmon Survey	·	3.0 km	MPC · JPL
734534	2015 AK_{292}	—	September 3, 2010	Mount Lemmon	Mount Lemmon Survey	·	540 m	MPC · JPL
734535	2015 BW	—	November 28, 2005	Catalina	CSS	·	2.4 km	MPC · JPL
734536	2015 BF_{2}	—	December 29, 2014	Haleakala	Pan-STARRS 1	·	2.8 km	MPC · JPL
734537	2015 BG_{3}	—	June 13, 2004	Kitt Peak	Spacewatch	·	1.8 km	MPC · JPL
734538	2015 BA_{5}	—	February 16, 2010	Mount Lemmon	Mount Lemmon Survey	·	4.1 km	MPC · JPL
734539	2015 BE_{6}	—	March 19, 2010	Mount Lemmon	Mount Lemmon Survey	·	3.6 km	MPC · JPL
734540	2015 BY_{7}	—	February 11, 2004	Palomar	NEAT	EUP	5.1 km	MPC · JPL
734541	2015 BZ_{7}	—	November 18, 2007	Mount Lemmon	Mount Lemmon Survey	(883)	600 m	MPC · JPL
734542	2015 BU_{8}	—	February 8, 2002	Kitt Peak	Spacewatch	·	2.5 km	MPC · JPL
734543	2015 BX_{9}	—	December 29, 2014	Haleakala	Pan-STARRS 1	·	2.9 km	MPC · JPL
734544	2015 BD_{10}	—	December 29, 2014	Haleakala	Pan-STARRS 1	EOS	1.6 km	MPC · JPL
734545	2015 BW_{10}	—	January 20, 2009	Kitt Peak	Spacewatch	·	3.9 km	MPC · JPL
734546	2015 BB_{11}	—	January 16, 2015	Mount Lemmon	Mount Lemmon Survey	·	2.5 km	MPC · JPL
734547	2015 BR_{14}	—	May 31, 2010	WISE	WISE	·	3.3 km	MPC · JPL
734548	2015 BU_{15}	—	January 16, 2015	Mount Lemmon	Mount Lemmon Survey	·	2.8 km	MPC · JPL
734549	2015 BV_{15}	—	March 20, 2010	Mount Lemmon	Mount Lemmon Survey	VER	2.7 km	MPC · JPL
734550	2015 BY_{15}	—	June 1, 2005	Mount Lemmon	Mount Lemmon Survey	·	3.1 km	MPC · JPL
734551 Monin	2015 BS_{16}	Monin	April 7, 1997	Dominion	D. D. Balam	·	910 m	MPC · JPL
734552	2015 BP_{17}	—	February 22, 2004	Kitt Peak	Deep Ecliptic Survey	NYS	1.1 km	MPC · JPL
734553	2015 BL_{19}	—	February 16, 2010	Kitt Peak	Spacewatch	·	2.2 km	MPC · JPL
734554	2015 BD_{20}	—	August 24, 2007	Kitt Peak	Spacewatch	LIX	4.2 km	MPC · JPL
734555	2015 BM_{21}	—	January 22, 1998	Kitt Peak	Spacewatch	·	2.7 km	MPC · JPL
734556	2015 BD_{22}	—	January 11, 2008	Mount Lemmon	Mount Lemmon Survey	·	580 m	MPC · JPL
734557	2015 BA_{23}	—	October 1, 2013	Mount Lemmon	Mount Lemmon Survey	NYS	990 m	MPC · JPL
734558	2015 BM_{23}	—	January 14, 2008	Kitt Peak	Spacewatch	·	620 m	MPC · JPL
734559	2015 BG_{24}	—	January 15, 2008	Kitt Peak	Spacewatch	BAP	700 m	MPC · JPL
734560	2015 BT_{26}	—	November 24, 2003	Palomar	NEAT	·	2.9 km	MPC · JPL
734561	2015 BJ_{27}	—	December 3, 2005	Mauna Kea	A. Boattini	DOR	1.8 km	MPC · JPL
734562	2015 BY_{27}	—	August 3, 2003	Leyburn	J. Riffle, W. K. Y. Yeung	·	3.1 km	MPC · JPL
734563	2015 BL_{28}	—	January 1, 2009	Mount Lemmon	Mount Lemmon Survey	(31811)	2.9 km	MPC · JPL
734564	2015 BY_{29}	—	October 19, 2006	Mount Lemmon	Mount Lemmon Survey	·	1.1 km	MPC · JPL
734565	2015 BB_{30}	—	January 16, 2015	Haleakala	Pan-STARRS 1	V	450 m	MPC · JPL
734566	2015 BL_{31}	—	October 4, 2013	Mount Lemmon	Mount Lemmon Survey	·	1.0 km	MPC · JPL
734567	2015 BS_{32}	—	October 15, 2001	Palomar	NEAT	·	4.1 km	MPC · JPL
734568	2015 BG_{33}	—	January 16, 2015	Haleakala	Pan-STARRS 1	·	2.7 km	MPC · JPL
734569	2015 BX_{33}	—	January 16, 2015	Haleakala	Pan-STARRS 1	V	380 m	MPC · JPL
734570	2015 BW_{35}	—	May 10, 2002	Palomar	NEAT	·	2.6 km	MPC · JPL
734571	2015 BV_{36}	—	January 1, 2009	Kitt Peak	Spacewatch	·	2.5 km	MPC · JPL
734572	2015 BF_{37}	—	October 26, 2009	Mount Lemmon	Mount Lemmon Survey	·	2.1 km	MPC · JPL
734573	2015 BU_{39}	—	December 29, 2014	Haleakala	Pan-STARRS 1	EOS	1.5 km	MPC · JPL
734574	2015 BL_{41}	—	April 15, 2005	Kitt Peak	Spacewatch	·	3.8 km	MPC · JPL
734575	2015 BR_{41}	—	June 2, 2010	WISE	WISE	VER	2.0 km	MPC · JPL
734576	2015 BY_{41}	—	June 3, 2008	Kitt Peak	Spacewatch	·	1.7 km	MPC · JPL
734577	2015 BM_{42}	—	October 19, 2007	Catalina	CSS	·	690 m	MPC · JPL
734578	2015 BZ_{42}	—	November 19, 2003	Kitt Peak	Spacewatch	·	3.0 km	MPC · JPL
734579	2015 BY_{43}	—	November 26, 2014	Haleakala	Pan-STARRS 1	·	900 m	MPC · JPL
734580	2015 BC_{44}	—	January 15, 1999	Kitt Peak	Spacewatch	EOS	1.7 km	MPC · JPL
734581	2015 BU_{47}	—	January 8, 1999	Kitt Peak	Spacewatch	·	3.0 km	MPC · JPL
734582	2015 BS_{48}	—	May 1, 2006	Kitt Peak	Spacewatch	·	3.0 km	MPC · JPL
734583	2015 BG_{49}	—	January 17, 2015	Haleakala	Pan-STARRS 1	VER	2.2 km	MPC · JPL
734584	2015 BR_{50}	—	October 9, 2008	Kitt Peak	Spacewatch	·	2.0 km	MPC · JPL
734585	2015 BZ_{53}	—	January 12, 2010	Mount Lemmon	Mount Lemmon Survey	TIR	3.1 km	MPC · JPL
734586	2015 BG_{54}	—	January 17, 2015	Mount Lemmon	Mount Lemmon Survey	·	510 m	MPC · JPL
734587	2015 BS_{56}	—	January 17, 2015	Mount Lemmon	Mount Lemmon Survey	EOS	1.5 km	MPC · JPL
734588	2015 BN_{57}	—	January 11, 2011	Kitt Peak	Spacewatch	·	850 m	MPC · JPL
734589	2015 BY_{61}	—	February 10, 2008	Mount Lemmon	Mount Lemmon Survey	·	800 m	MPC · JPL
734590	2015 BG_{63}	—	January 17, 2015	Haleakala	Pan-STARRS 1	·	1.7 km	MPC · JPL
734591	2015 BK_{63}	—	October 6, 2013	Kitt Peak	Spacewatch	VER	2.2 km	MPC · JPL
734592	2015 BB_{66}	—	February 16, 2004	Kitt Peak	Spacewatch	·	3.7 km	MPC · JPL
734593	2015 BG_{68}	—	March 18, 2010	Mount Lemmon	Mount Lemmon Survey	EOS	1.5 km	MPC · JPL
734594	2015 BL_{69}	—	June 11, 2010	WISE	WISE	·	2.8 km	MPC · JPL
734595	2015 BT_{69}	—	April 5, 2010	Mount Lemmon	Mount Lemmon Survey	·	2.4 km	MPC · JPL
734596	2015 BW_{69}	—	November 28, 2014	Haleakala	Pan-STARRS 1	·	2.7 km	MPC · JPL
734597	2015 BB_{72}	—	September 13, 2013	Mount Lemmon	Mount Lemmon Survey	AGN	1.1 km	MPC · JPL
734598	2015 BR_{72}	—	October 17, 2010	Mount Lemmon	Mount Lemmon Survey	·	780 m	MPC · JPL
734599	2015 BR_{73}	—	January 17, 2015	Haleakala	Pan-STARRS 1	·	540 m	MPC · JPL
734600	2015 BY_{73}	—	February 4, 2002	Palomar	NEAT	·	3.7 km	MPC · JPL

== 734601–734700 ==
back to top

Designation			Discovery			Properties		Ref
Permanent	Provisional	Named after	Date	Site	Discoverer(s)	Category	Diam.	Ref
734601	2015 BQ_{74}	—	May 4, 2005	Catalina	CSS	·	4.5 km	MPC · JPL
734602	2015 BL_{76}	—	April 12, 2010	Mount Lemmon	Mount Lemmon Survey	·	2.4 km	MPC · JPL
734603	2015 BU_{77}	—	November 1, 2013	Mount Lemmon	Mount Lemmon Survey	·	2.5 km	MPC · JPL
734604	2015 BB_{79}	—	January 18, 2015	Mount Lemmon	Mount Lemmon Survey	·	2.8 km	MPC · JPL
734605	2015 BK_{81}	—	May 15, 2010	WISE	WISE	·	4.0 km	MPC · JPL
734606	2015 BO_{81}	—	October 7, 2013	Kitt Peak	Spacewatch	·	2.9 km	MPC · JPL
734607	2015 BQ_{81}	—	October 1, 2013	Mount Lemmon	Mount Lemmon Survey	·	2.5 km	MPC · JPL
734608	2015 BU_{81}	—	March 15, 2010	Mount Lemmon	Mount Lemmon Survey	·	4.1 km	MPC · JPL
734609	2015 BZ_{82}	—	September 12, 2007	Kitt Peak	Spacewatch	·	3.3 km	MPC · JPL
734610	2015 BT_{83}	—	December 22, 2008	Kitt Peak	Spacewatch	·	3.3 km	MPC · JPL
734611	2015 BD_{85}	—	December 18, 2014	Haleakala	Pan-STARRS 1	·	2.7 km	MPC · JPL
734612	2015 BC_{86}	—	May 8, 2010	WISE	WISE	·	1.9 km	MPC · JPL
734613	2015 BS_{86}	—	January 18, 2015	Haleakala	Pan-STARRS 1	·	1.6 km	MPC · JPL
734614	2015 BT_{86}	—	December 4, 2010	Piszkés-tető	K. Sárneczky, S. Kürti	·	920 m	MPC · JPL
734615	2015 BB_{96}	—	April 4, 2011	Mount Lemmon	Mount Lemmon Survey	KOR	1.0 km	MPC · JPL
734616	2015 BS_{96}	—	January 16, 2015	Mount Lemmon	Mount Lemmon Survey	·	2.9 km	MPC · JPL
734617	2015 BT_{96}	—	December 21, 2014	Haleakala	Pan-STARRS 1	·	2.6 km	MPC · JPL
734618	2015 BQ_{97}	—	September 29, 2009	Mount Lemmon	Mount Lemmon Survey	·	1.3 km	MPC · JPL
734619	2015 BZ_{98}	—	March 17, 2012	Mount Lemmon	Mount Lemmon Survey	·	540 m	MPC · JPL
734620	2015 BP_{99}	—	April 18, 2007	Bergisch Gladbach	W. Bickel	·	2.3 km	MPC · JPL
734621	2015 BL_{101}	—	January 16, 2015	Haleakala	Pan-STARRS 1	·	2.7 km	MPC · JPL
734622	2015 BT_{101}	—	February 9, 2010	WISE	WISE	·	3.6 km	MPC · JPL
734623	2015 BC_{103}	—	January 16, 2015	Haleakala	Pan-STARRS 1	·	1.3 km	MPC · JPL
734624	2015 BP_{103}	—	March 13, 2008	Kitt Peak	Spacewatch	·	630 m	MPC · JPL
734625	2015 BT_{103}	—	January 16, 2015	Haleakala	Pan-STARRS 1	·	530 m	MPC · JPL
734626	2015 BX_{107}	—	December 6, 2008	Kitt Peak	Spacewatch	·	3.8 km	MPC · JPL
734627	2015 BU_{108}	—	September 1, 2013	Haleakala	Pan-STARRS 1	·	680 m	MPC · JPL
734628	2015 BU_{111}	—	January 17, 2015	Haleakala	Pan-STARRS 1	·	2.1 km	MPC · JPL
734629	2015 BW_{111}	—	January 17, 2015	Mount Lemmon	Mount Lemmon Survey	·	2.4 km	MPC · JPL
734630	2015 BX_{111}	—	September 15, 2013	Mount Lemmon	Mount Lemmon Survey	·	2.8 km	MPC · JPL
734631	2015 BU_{112}	—	February 10, 2008	Kitt Peak	Spacewatch	·	1.1 km	MPC · JPL
734632	2015 BW_{115}	—	January 11, 2010	Kitt Peak	Spacewatch	·	2.7 km	MPC · JPL
734633	2015 BQ_{116}	—	October 17, 2003	Kitt Peak	Spacewatch	·	2.8 km	MPC · JPL
734634	2015 BC_{119}	—	February 24, 2006	Kitt Peak	Spacewatch	DOR	2.3 km	MPC · JPL
734635	2015 BP_{119}	—	September 5, 2007	Siding Spring	K. Sárneczky, L. Kiss	·	1.7 km	MPC · JPL
734636	2015 BK_{121}	—	October 7, 2013	Kitt Peak	Spacewatch	·	1.9 km	MPC · JPL
734637	2015 BR_{122}	—	January 6, 2008	Mauna Kea	A. Boattini	V	390 m	MPC · JPL
734638	2015 BW_{122}	—	November 17, 2007	Kitt Peak	Spacewatch	·	480 m	MPC · JPL
734639	2015 BL_{130}	—	May 6, 2006	Mount Lemmon	Mount Lemmon Survey	·	1.5 km	MPC · JPL
734640	2015 BX_{130}	—	November 20, 2007	Mount Lemmon	Mount Lemmon Survey	·	530 m	MPC · JPL
734641	2015 BX_{132}	—	March 17, 2005	Mount Lemmon	Mount Lemmon Survey	·	570 m	MPC · JPL
734642	2015 BJ_{134}	—	November 16, 2006	Kitt Peak	Spacewatch	NYS	860 m	MPC · JPL
734643	2015 BT_{136}	—	May 10, 2010	WISE	WISE	·	2.3 km	MPC · JPL
734644	2015 BU_{136}	—	January 17, 2015	Haleakala	Pan-STARRS 1	WIT	720 m	MPC · JPL
734645	2015 BN_{138}	—	October 8, 2010	Kitt Peak	Spacewatch	·	520 m	MPC · JPL
734646	2015 BY_{139}	—	September 10, 2007	Mount Lemmon	Mount Lemmon Survey	·	2.0 km	MPC · JPL
734647	2015 BQ_{140}	—	November 4, 2007	Mount Lemmon	Mount Lemmon Survey	·	480 m	MPC · JPL
734648	2015 BC_{143}	—	January 17, 2015	Haleakala	Pan-STARRS 1	·	1.4 km	MPC · JPL
734649	2015 BW_{144}	—	January 24, 2006	Mount Nyukasa	Japan Aerospace Exploration Agency	·	1.7 km	MPC · JPL
734650	2015 BC_{145}	—	November 12, 2010	Mount Lemmon	Mount Lemmon Survey	·	600 m	MPC · JPL
734651	2015 BW_{145}	—	October 24, 2013	Kitt Peak	Spacewatch	·	1.9 km	MPC · JPL
734652	2015 BJ_{146}	—	February 7, 2002	Palomar	NEAT	·	2.2 km	MPC · JPL
734653	2015 BY_{146}	—	December 30, 2008	Mount Lemmon	Mount Lemmon Survey	·	2.6 km	MPC · JPL
734654	2015 BB_{147}	—	November 30, 2008	Kitt Peak	Spacewatch	·	1.9 km	MPC · JPL
734655	2015 BW_{147}	—	October 7, 2005	Mauna Kea	A. Boattini	·	2.1 km	MPC · JPL
734656	2015 BW_{148}	—	November 2, 2013	Nogales	M. Schwartz, P. R. Holvorcem	HOF	2.4 km	MPC · JPL
734657	2015 BO_{149}	—	January 17, 2015	Haleakala	Pan-STARRS 1	·	2.6 km	MPC · JPL
734658	2015 BN_{150}	—	January 17, 2004	Palomar	NEAT	·	3.4 km	MPC · JPL
734659	2015 BT_{151}	—	January 17, 2015	Haleakala	Pan-STARRS 1	·	1.6 km	MPC · JPL
734660	2015 BV_{152}	—	August 15, 2013	Haleakala	Pan-STARRS 1	·	560 m	MPC · JPL
734661	2015 BO_{154}	—	March 8, 2008	Mount Lemmon	Mount Lemmon Survey	·	900 m	MPC · JPL
734662	2015 BP_{157}	—	January 17, 2015	Haleakala	Pan-STARRS 1	·	2.5 km	MPC · JPL
734663	2015 BY_{159}	—	January 17, 2015	Haleakala	Pan-STARRS 1	·	1.4 km	MPC · JPL
734664	2015 BA_{161}	—	April 3, 2008	Mount Lemmon	Mount Lemmon Survey	PHO	710 m	MPC · JPL
734665	2015 BY_{164}	—	September 11, 2007	Kitt Peak	Spacewatch	·	2.4 km	MPC · JPL
734666	2015 BW_{168}	—	April 13, 2004	Apache Point	SDSS Collaboration	T_{j} (2.99) · (895)	4.1 km	MPC · JPL
734667	2015 BA_{176}	—	March 16, 2012	Mount Lemmon	Mount Lemmon Survey	·	750 m	MPC · JPL
734668	2015 BL_{185}	—	May 16, 2010	WISE	WISE	·	1.8 km	MPC · JPL
734669	2015 BJ_{186}	—	January 17, 2015	Haleakala	Pan-STARRS 1	·	940 m	MPC · JPL
734670	2015 BZ_{190}	—	January 14, 2011	Mount Lemmon	Mount Lemmon Survey	MAS	560 m	MPC · JPL
734671	2015 BZ_{192}	—	January 17, 2015	Haleakala	Pan-STARRS 1	RAF	690 m	MPC · JPL
734672	2015 BD_{196}	—	February 25, 2006	Kitt Peak	Spacewatch	HOF	2.4 km	MPC · JPL
734673	2015 BC_{198}	—	August 22, 2006	Palomar	NEAT	·	800 m	MPC · JPL
734674	2015 BN_{201}	—	January 17, 2015	Haleakala	Pan-STARRS 1	·	2.2 km	MPC · JPL
734675	2015 BB_{202}	—	March 18, 2002	Kitt Peak	Deep Ecliptic Survey	·	2.8 km	MPC · JPL
734676	2015 BY_{202}	—	April 4, 2010	WISE	WISE	L5	10 km	MPC · JPL
734677	2015 BE_{205}	—	January 18, 2015	Mount Lemmon	Mount Lemmon Survey	·	950 m	MPC · JPL
734678	2015 BE_{206}	—	March 29, 2011	Mount Lemmon	Mount Lemmon Survey	KOR	1.2 km	MPC · JPL
734679	2015 BS_{206}	—	January 12, 2010	WISE	WISE	·	2.8 km	MPC · JPL
734680	2015 BF_{207}	—	October 10, 2008	Mount Lemmon	Mount Lemmon Survey	EOS	2.0 km	MPC · JPL
734681	2015 BB_{210}	—	November 26, 2014	Haleakala	Pan-STARRS 1	·	2.4 km	MPC · JPL
734682	2015 BP_{210}	—	January 18, 2015	Mount Lemmon	Mount Lemmon Survey	·	1.6 km	MPC · JPL
734683	2015 BL_{211}	—	January 17, 2015	Haleakala	Pan-STARRS 1	·	930 m	MPC · JPL
734684	2015 BH_{216}	—	October 3, 2013	Mount Lemmon	Mount Lemmon Survey	·	3.3 km	MPC · JPL
734685	2015 BW_{216}	—	December 26, 2014	Haleakala	Pan-STARRS 1	·	500 m	MPC · JPL
734686	2015 BN_{217}	—	February 16, 2012	Haleakala	Pan-STARRS 1	·	540 m	MPC · JPL
734687	2015 BS_{217}	—	October 7, 2008	Mount Lemmon	Mount Lemmon Survey	EOS	1.8 km	MPC · JPL
734688	2015 BM_{222}	—	June 3, 2010	WISE	WISE	·	3.7 km	MPC · JPL
734689	2015 BK_{223}	—	December 26, 2014	Haleakala	Pan-STARRS 1	·	2.4 km	MPC · JPL
734690	2015 BX_{224}	—	July 13, 2013	Haleakala	Pan-STARRS 1	·	690 m	MPC · JPL
734691	2015 BZ_{225}	—	January 18, 2015	Haleakala	Pan-STARRS 1	·	1.8 km	MPC · JPL
734692	2015 BZ_{229}	—	July 21, 2010	WISE	WISE	PHO	930 m	MPC · JPL
734693	2015 BH_{233}	—	January 18, 2015	Haleakala	Pan-STARRS 1	·	1.5 km	MPC · JPL
734694	2015 BV_{233}	—	November 2, 2007	Kitt Peak	Spacewatch	·	520 m	MPC · JPL
734695	2015 BR_{235}	—	December 26, 2014	Haleakala	Pan-STARRS 1	·	2.4 km	MPC · JPL
734696	2015 BM_{237}	—	January 23, 2006	Kitt Peak	Spacewatch	HOF	2.1 km	MPC · JPL
734697	2015 BS_{237}	—	April 28, 2011	Kitt Peak	Spacewatch	ELF	3.2 km	MPC · JPL
734698	2015 BQ_{239}	—	January 12, 2010	Kitt Peak	Spacewatch	·	4.0 km	MPC · JPL
734699	2015 BF_{240}	—	September 24, 2013	Catalina	CSS	TIR	2.3 km	MPC · JPL
734700	2015 BK_{240}	—	December 25, 2003	Apache Point	SDSS	TIR	2.5 km	MPC · JPL

== 734701–734800 ==
back to top

Designation			Discovery			Properties		Ref
Permanent	Provisional	Named after	Date	Site	Discoverer(s)	Category	Diam.	Ref
734701	2015 BZ_{241}	—	October 5, 2002	Apache Point	SDSS Collaboration	EOS	1.7 km	MPC · JPL
734702	2015 BG_{242}	—	January 27, 2010	WISE	WISE	·	3.7 km	MPC · JPL
734703	2015 BB_{247}	—	January 18, 2015	Haleakala	Pan-STARRS 1	·	1.1 km	MPC · JPL
734704	2015 BQ_{247}	—	February 14, 2010	Mount Lemmon	Mount Lemmon Survey	·	2.6 km	MPC · JPL
734705	2015 BT_{247}	—	November 28, 2013	Haleakala	Pan-STARRS 1	·	3.1 km	MPC · JPL
734706	2015 BW_{249}	—	October 23, 2006	Kitt Peak	Spacewatch	·	810 m	MPC · JPL
734707	2015 BA_{250}	—	February 28, 2012	Haleakala	Pan-STARRS 1	·	550 m	MPC · JPL
734708	2015 BL_{250}	—	November 15, 2010	Mount Lemmon	Mount Lemmon Survey	·	1.2 km	MPC · JPL
734709	2015 BN_{253}	—	January 25, 2010	WISE	WISE	·	3.3 km	MPC · JPL
734710	2015 BD_{255}	—	January 18, 2015	Haleakala	Pan-STARRS 1	·	760 m	MPC · JPL
734711	2015 BV_{258}	—	October 5, 2002	Apache Point	SDSS Collaboration	EOS	1.7 km	MPC · JPL
734712	2015 BO_{260}	—	May 29, 2010	WISE	WISE	·	3.2 km	MPC · JPL
734713	2015 BK_{261}	—	October 22, 2003	Apache Point	SDSS Collaboration	·	650 m	MPC · JPL
734714	2015 BH_{262}	—	March 14, 2010	Mount Lemmon	Mount Lemmon Survey	·	2.6 km	MPC · JPL
734715	2015 BX_{263}	—	October 11, 2007	Kitt Peak	Spacewatch	·	5.2 km	MPC · JPL
734716	2015 BB_{264}	—	February 19, 2009	Catalina	CSS	·	4.1 km	MPC · JPL
734717	2015 BN_{265}	—	October 8, 2007	Mount Lemmon	Mount Lemmon Survey	·	2.3 km	MPC · JPL
734718	2015 BO_{266}	—	March 25, 2007	Mount Lemmon	Mount Lemmon Survey	·	3.2 km	MPC · JPL
734719	2015 BQ_{266}	—	March 27, 2010	WISE	WISE	·	3.0 km	MPC · JPL
734720	2015 BG_{268}	—	January 12, 2010	Kitt Peak	Spacewatch	·	2.9 km	MPC · JPL
734721	2015 BN_{270}	—	October 20, 2003	Kitt Peak	Spacewatch	·	2.1 km	MPC · JPL
734722	2015 BD_{271}	—	December 20, 2009	Kitt Peak	Spacewatch	·	4.3 km	MPC · JPL
734723	2015 BL_{271}	—	November 26, 2014	Mount Lemmon	Mount Lemmon Survey	·	2.6 km	MPC · JPL
734724	2015 BQ_{272}	—	May 16, 2005	Palomar	NEAT	·	3.3 km	MPC · JPL
734725	2015 BV_{273}	—	October 5, 2004	Kitt Peak	Spacewatch	·	570 m	MPC · JPL
734726	2015 BR_{276}	—	January 8, 2002	Apache Point	SDSS Collaboration	·	4.2 km	MPC · JPL
734727	2015 BV_{276}	—	April 7, 2010	WISE	WISE	·	3.0 km	MPC · JPL
734728	2015 BL_{279}	—	October 21, 2007	Kitt Peak	Spacewatch	·	2.7 km	MPC · JPL
734729	2015 BX_{279}	—	April 2, 2005	Kitt Peak	Spacewatch	·	3.4 km	MPC · JPL
734730	2015 BX_{280}	—	April 11, 2005	Mount Lemmon	Mount Lemmon Survey	·	2.4 km	MPC · JPL
734731	2015 BK_{281}	—	May 13, 2010	WISE	WISE	·	2.5 km	MPC · JPL
734732	2015 BL_{281}	—	June 9, 2010	WISE	WISE	·	3.3 km	MPC · JPL
734733	2015 BW_{281}	—	January 19, 2015	Haleakala	Pan-STARRS 1	EOS	1.5 km	MPC · JPL
734734	2015 BX_{281}	—	October 10, 2002	Apache Point	SDSS Collaboration	EOS	1.6 km	MPC · JPL
734735	2015 BQ_{282}	—	January 16, 2004	Palomar	NEAT	EUP	3.6 km	MPC · JPL
734736	2015 BZ_{282}	—	January 8, 2010	WISE	WISE	·	3.7 km	MPC · JPL
734737	2015 BF_{284}	—	June 10, 2010	WISE	WISE	·	3.2 km	MPC · JPL
734738	2015 BN_{286}	—	March 13, 2011	Kitt Peak	Spacewatch	·	1.6 km	MPC · JPL
734739	2015 BO_{287}	—	April 7, 2010	Kitt Peak	Spacewatch	·	2.9 km	MPC · JPL
734740	2015 BR_{288}	—	September 14, 2007	Mount Lemmon	Mount Lemmon Survey	·	2.8 km	MPC · JPL
734741	2015 BB_{296}	—	October 10, 2007	Kitt Peak	Spacewatch	EOS	1.7 km	MPC · JPL
734742	2015 BM_{297}	—	December 6, 2010	Mount Lemmon	Mount Lemmon Survey	·	1 km	MPC · JPL
734743	2015 BY_{297}	—	August 21, 2000	Anderson Mesa	LONEOS	·	3.4 km	MPC · JPL
734744	2015 BN_{301}	—	January 19, 2015	Haleakala	Pan-STARRS 1	·	1.5 km	MPC · JPL
734745	2015 BK_{303}	—	January 12, 2010	Catalina	CSS	DOR	2.1 km	MPC · JPL
734746	2015 BS_{305}	—	September 19, 1998	Apache Point	SDSS Collaboration	·	1.9 km	MPC · JPL
734747	2015 BF_{306}	—	October 20, 2008	Kitt Peak	Spacewatch	EOS	1.8 km	MPC · JPL
734748	2015 BW_{307}	—	May 27, 2010	WISE	WISE	·	2.5 km	MPC · JPL
734749	2015 BW_{308}	—	October 3, 2013	Haleakala	Pan-STARRS 1	·	1.2 km	MPC · JPL
734750	2015 BT_{311}	—	November 8, 2009	Mount Lemmon	Mount Lemmon Survey	·	1.7 km	MPC · JPL
734751	2015 BU_{311}	—	October 1, 2009	Mount Lemmon	Mount Lemmon Survey	·	2.6 km	MPC · JPL
734752	2015 BF_{313}	—	May 24, 2001	Apache Point	SDSS	·	1.8 km	MPC · JPL
734753	2015 BW_{317}	—	June 12, 2010	WISE	WISE	·	2.4 km	MPC · JPL
734754	2015 BF_{319}	—	January 17, 2015	Haleakala	Pan-STARRS 1	·	1.2 km	MPC · JPL
734755	2015 BK_{320}	—	May 17, 2012	Mount Lemmon	Mount Lemmon Survey	·	680 m	MPC · JPL
734756	2015 BL_{324}	—	April 6, 2008	Mount Lemmon	Mount Lemmon Survey	V	490 m	MPC · JPL
734757	2015 BH_{326}	—	November 29, 2013	Haleakala	Pan-STARRS 1	·	3.0 km	MPC · JPL
734758	2015 BV_{327}	—	August 27, 2001	Kitt Peak	Spacewatch	·	2.5 km	MPC · JPL
734759	2015 BP_{328}	—	October 21, 2003	Kitt Peak	Spacewatch	·	540 m	MPC · JPL
734760	2015 BX_{329}	—	March 24, 2006	Kitt Peak	Spacewatch	HOF	3.3 km	MPC · JPL
734761	2015 BJ_{342}	—	January 17, 2015	Haleakala	Pan-STARRS 1	·	1.8 km	MPC · JPL
734762	2015 BL_{343}	—	September 12, 2007	Mount Lemmon	Mount Lemmon Survey	THM	1.9 km	MPC · JPL
734763	2015 BM_{344}	—	January 17, 2015	Haleakala	Pan-STARRS 1	·	1.7 km	MPC · JPL
734764	2015 BQ_{344}	—	October 25, 2013	Mount Lemmon	Mount Lemmon Survey	·	1.6 km	MPC · JPL
734765	2015 BN_{345}	—	December 3, 2008	Mount Lemmon	Mount Lemmon Survey	·	2.7 km	MPC · JPL
734766	2015 BZ_{345}	—	November 14, 2007	Kitt Peak	Spacewatch	·	3.6 km	MPC · JPL
734767	2015 BB_{347}	—	December 26, 2014	Haleakala	Pan-STARRS 1	PHO	710 m	MPC · JPL
734768	2015 BO_{347}	—	December 26, 2014	Haleakala	Pan-STARRS 1	VER	2.3 km	MPC · JPL
734769	2015 BE_{349}	—	September 14, 2013	Haleakala	Pan-STARRS 1	·	2.5 km	MPC · JPL
734770	2015 BF_{349}	—	January 13, 2015	Haleakala	Pan-STARRS 1	TEL	1.1 km	MPC · JPL
734771	2015 BE_{350}	—	August 20, 2006	Palomar	NEAT	(2076)	650 m	MPC · JPL
734772	2015 BF_{350}	—	February 17, 2010	Kitt Peak	Spacewatch	·	2.3 km	MPC · JPL
734773	2015 BL_{350}	—	May 13, 2005	Kitt Peak	Spacewatch	·	3.3 km	MPC · JPL
734774	2015 BS_{350}	—	April 24, 2010	WISE	WISE	·	2.2 km	MPC · JPL
734775	2015 BC_{351}	—	May 30, 2010	WISE	WISE	·	2.3 km	MPC · JPL
734776	2015 BQ_{351}	—	February 16, 2010	Mount Lemmon	Mount Lemmon Survey	·	3.0 km	MPC · JPL
734777	2015 BX_{351}	—	January 18, 2015	Mount Lemmon	Mount Lemmon Survey	·	2.3 km	MPC · JPL
734778	2015 BV_{354}	—	September 6, 2012	Mount Lemmon	Mount Lemmon Survey	526	2.3 km	MPC · JPL
734779	2015 BL_{356}	—	June 16, 2010	WISE	WISE	·	3.1 km	MPC · JPL
734780	2015 BB_{358}	—	February 15, 2010	Mount Lemmon	Mount Lemmon Survey	·	3.0 km	MPC · JPL
734781	2015 BT_{359}	—	September 20, 2007	Kitt Peak	Spacewatch	·	2.0 km	MPC · JPL
734782	2015 BN_{363}	—	May 23, 2001	Cerro Tololo	Deep Ecliptic Survey	·	4.9 km	MPC · JPL
734783	2015 BK_{375}	—	August 2, 2009	Siding Spring	SSS	·	1.1 km	MPC · JPL
734784	2015 BD_{378}	—	December 21, 2014	Haleakala	Pan-STARRS 1	HYG	2.4 km	MPC · JPL
734785	2015 BP_{379}	—	October 4, 2013	Mount Lemmon	Mount Lemmon Survey	EMA	2.3 km	MPC · JPL
734786	2015 BR_{381}	—	October 3, 2013	Haleakala	Pan-STARRS 1	NYS	980 m	MPC · JPL
734787	2015 BQ_{386}	—	September 14, 2013	Kitt Peak	Spacewatch	V	520 m	MPC · JPL
734788	2015 BJ_{390}	—	January 20, 2015	Haleakala	Pan-STARRS 1	·	2.3 km	MPC · JPL
734789	2015 BU_{391}	—	January 20, 2015	Haleakala	Pan-STARRS 1	·	670 m	MPC · JPL
734790	2015 BO_{397}	—	January 20, 2015	Haleakala	Pan-STARRS 1	·	2.1 km	MPC · JPL
734791	2015 BA_{398}	—	January 20, 2015	Haleakala	Pan-STARRS 1	KOR	1.1 km	MPC · JPL
734792	2015 BB_{399}	—	February 16, 2010	WISE	WISE	·	3.5 km	MPC · JPL
734793	2015 BC_{399}	—	January 30, 2008	Mount Lemmon	Mount Lemmon Survey	·	1.0 km	MPC · JPL
734794	2015 BF_{404}	—	January 20, 2015	Haleakala	Pan-STARRS 1	·	1.1 km	MPC · JPL
734795	2015 BZ_{406}	—	December 21, 2003	Kitt Peak	Spacewatch	NYS	750 m	MPC · JPL
734796	2015 BS_{407}	—	August 14, 2012	Haleakala	Pan-STARRS 1	·	2.8 km	MPC · JPL
734797	2015 BX_{408}	—	January 20, 2015	Haleakala	Pan-STARRS 1	·	870 m	MPC · JPL
734798	2015 BY_{410}	—	January 20, 2015	Haleakala	Pan-STARRS 1	·	980 m	MPC · JPL
734799	2015 BB_{411}	—	January 20, 2015	Haleakala	Pan-STARRS 1	·	570 m	MPC · JPL
734800	2015 BX_{414}	—	November 18, 2003	Kitt Peak	Spacewatch	·	570 m	MPC · JPL

== 734801–734900 ==
back to top

Designation			Discovery			Properties		Ref
Permanent	Provisional	Named after	Date	Site	Discoverer(s)	Category	Diam.	Ref
734801	2015 BC_{417}	—	April 16, 2005	Kitt Peak	Spacewatch	·	2.4 km	MPC · JPL
734802	2015 BM_{422}	—	October 1, 2008	Mount Lemmon	Mount Lemmon Survey	·	1.3 km	MPC · JPL
734803	2015 BN_{423}	—	January 20, 2015	Haleakala	Pan-STARRS 1	·	780 m	MPC · JPL
734804	2015 BC_{425}	—	March 16, 2012	Mount Lemmon	Mount Lemmon Survey	·	590 m	MPC · JPL
734805	2015 BC_{429}	—	January 5, 2006	Mount Lemmon	Mount Lemmon Survey	·	1.7 km	MPC · JPL
734806	2015 BV_{430}	—	February 26, 2004	Kitt Peak	Deep Ecliptic Survey	VER	1.8 km	MPC · JPL
734807	2015 BP_{433}	—	November 1, 2008	Mount Lemmon	Mount Lemmon Survey	·	2.8 km	MPC · JPL
734808	2015 BR_{436}	—	January 20, 2015	Haleakala	Pan-STARRS 1	·	530 m	MPC · JPL
734809	2015 BN_{443}	—	April 3, 2010	WISE	WISE	·	2.0 km	MPC · JPL
734810	2015 BE_{444}	—	January 20, 2015	Haleakala	Pan-STARRS 1	EOS	1.5 km	MPC · JPL
734811	2015 BV_{446}	—	January 16, 2009	Mount Lemmon	Mount Lemmon Survey	·	3.1 km	MPC · JPL
734812	2015 BX_{446}	—	December 29, 2008	Kitt Peak	Spacewatch	·	2.4 km	MPC · JPL
734813	2015 BM_{448}	—	January 20, 2015	Haleakala	Pan-STARRS 1	·	2.3 km	MPC · JPL
734814	2015 BJ_{449}	—	October 11, 2010	Mount Lemmon	Mount Lemmon Survey	·	540 m	MPC · JPL
734815	2015 BV_{449}	—	January 20, 2015	Haleakala	Pan-STARRS 1	·	570 m	MPC · JPL
734816	2015 BH_{452}	—	September 13, 1999	Kitt Peak	Spacewatch	·	710 m	MPC · JPL
734817	2015 BS_{456}	—	October 27, 2005	Kitt Peak	Spacewatch	3:2 · SHU	3.7 km	MPC · JPL
734818	2015 BT_{458}	—	April 17, 2005	Kitt Peak	Spacewatch	·	2.5 km	MPC · JPL
734819	2015 BR_{461}	—	April 21, 2012	Kitt Peak	Spacewatch	·	610 m	MPC · JPL
734820	2015 BQ_{464}	—	February 6, 2010	WISE	WISE	·	3.9 km	MPC · JPL
734821	2015 BB_{465}	—	April 29, 2008	Mount Lemmon	Mount Lemmon Survey	PHO	760 m	MPC · JPL
734822	2015 BG_{465}	—	September 28, 2006	Catalina	CSS	·	4.5 km	MPC · JPL
734823	2015 BX_{465}	—	January 20, 2015	Haleakala	Pan-STARRS 1	·	2.1 km	MPC · JPL
734824	2015 BB_{467}	—	March 16, 2004	Palomar	NEAT	PHO	840 m	MPC · JPL
734825	2015 BC_{467}	—	July 4, 2005	Mount Lemmon	Mount Lemmon Survey	·	3.3 km	MPC · JPL
734826	2015 BL_{468}	—	January 20, 2015	Kitt Peak	Spacewatch	·	950 m	MPC · JPL
734827	2015 BY_{470}	—	January 20, 2015	Haleakala	Pan-STARRS 1	·	2.3 km	MPC · JPL
734828	2015 BQ_{475}	—	January 9, 2006	Kitt Peak	Spacewatch	·	1.5 km	MPC · JPL
734829	2015 BT_{476}	—	January 20, 2015	Haleakala	Pan-STARRS 1	·	1.4 km	MPC · JPL
734830	2015 BW_{476}	—	February 12, 2011	Mount Lemmon	Mount Lemmon Survey	(5)	990 m	MPC · JPL
734831	2015 BE_{478}	—	December 2, 2008	Kitt Peak	Spacewatch	·	2.9 km	MPC · JPL
734832	2015 BO_{481}	—	May 27, 2010	WISE	WISE	·	2.4 km	MPC · JPL
734833	2015 BG_{483}	—	August 8, 2013	Haleakala	Pan-STARRS 1	V	390 m	MPC · JPL
734834	2015 BF_{484}	—	March 21, 2012	Catalina	CSS	·	560 m	MPC · JPL
734835	2015 BQ_{487}	—	November 10, 2013	Mount Lemmon	Mount Lemmon Survey	·	1.6 km	MPC · JPL
734836	2015 BN_{496}	—	May 21, 2012	Haleakala	Pan-STARRS 1	·	1.5 km	MPC · JPL
734837	2015 BY_{505}	—	September 26, 2006	Mount Lemmon	Mount Lemmon Survey	·	820 m	MPC · JPL
734838	2015 BH_{511}	—	October 22, 2008	Kitt Peak	Spacewatch	EOS	1.6 km	MPC · JPL
734839	2015 BT_{511}	—	February 4, 2006	Mount Lemmon	Mount Lemmon Survey	·	2.2 km	MPC · JPL
734840	2015 BN_{513}	—	February 11, 2004	Kitt Peak	D. E. Trilling, A. S. Rivkin	T_{j} (2.99)	2.7 km	MPC · JPL
734841	2015 BO_{513}	—	February 3, 1997	Haleakala-NEAT/GEO	NEAT	H	680 m	MPC · JPL
734842	2015 BR_{517}	—	September 12, 2007	Mount Lemmon	Mount Lemmon Survey	EOS	1.3 km	MPC · JPL
734843	2015 BW_{517}	—	January 15, 2015	Haleakala	Pan-STARRS 1	·	1.9 km	MPC · JPL
734844	2015 BH_{525}	—	August 17, 2012	ESA OGS	ESA OGS	·	1.6 km	MPC · JPL
734845	2015 BO_{525}	—	March 28, 2012	Kitt Peak	Spacewatch	·	490 m	MPC · JPL
734846	2015 BP_{529}	—	May 31, 2010	WISE	WISE	·	1.7 km	MPC · JPL
734847	2015 BV_{532}	—	January 20, 2010	WISE	WISE	·	2.5 km	MPC · JPL
734848	2015 BZ_{533}	—	May 25, 2006	Mauna Kea	P. A. Wiegert	·	1.3 km	MPC · JPL
734849	2015 BY_{536}	—	September 1, 2013	Haleakala	Pan-STARRS 1	·	680 m	MPC · JPL
734850	2015 BK_{539}	—	December 3, 2008	Kitt Peak	Spacewatch	·	2.1 km	MPC · JPL
734851	2015 BX_{541}	—	January 18, 2015	Kitt Peak	Spacewatch	·	830 m	MPC · JPL
734852	2015 BR_{542}	—	January 27, 2015	Haleakala	Pan-STARRS 1	V	510 m	MPC · JPL
734853	2015 BW_{546}	—	August 20, 2000	Kitt Peak	Spacewatch	·	1.3 km	MPC · JPL
734854	2015 BV_{547}	—	September 14, 2013	Haleakala	Pan-STARRS 1	·	2.2 km	MPC · JPL
734855	2015 BN_{548}	—	October 17, 2010	Mount Lemmon	Mount Lemmon Survey	·	590 m	MPC · JPL
734856	2015 BH_{552}	—	January 17, 2015	Mount Lemmon	Mount Lemmon Survey	·	850 m	MPC · JPL
734857	2015 BT_{553}	—	October 12, 2013	Mount Lemmon	Mount Lemmon Survey	VER	2.1 km	MPC · JPL
734858	2015 BV_{553}	—	May 10, 2010	WISE	WISE	URS	3.1 km	MPC · JPL
734859	2015 BH_{554}	—	May 9, 2010	WISE	WISE	·	4.0 km	MPC · JPL
734860	2015 BL_{555}	—	January 17, 2015	Mount Lemmon	Mount Lemmon Survey	·	2.2 km	MPC · JPL
734861	2015 BN_{556}	—	March 5, 2008	Mount Lemmon	Mount Lemmon Survey	·	990 m	MPC · JPL
734862	2015 BX_{558}	—	December 4, 2007	Catalina	CSS	·	740 m	MPC · JPL
734863	2015 BF_{559}	—	September 16, 2009	Catalina	CSS	·	2.3 km	MPC · JPL
734864	2015 BH_{559}	—	March 11, 2005	Mount Lemmon	Mount Lemmon Survey	·	1.9 km	MPC · JPL
734865	2015 BD_{560}	—	April 28, 2008	Kitt Peak	Spacewatch	·	1.1 km	MPC · JPL
734866	2015 BG_{560}	—	January 18, 2004	Palomar	NEAT	·	4.2 km	MPC · JPL
734867	2015 BZ_{560}	—	February 3, 2010	WISE	WISE	·	1.7 km	MPC · JPL
734868	2015 BJ_{561}	—	February 12, 2008	Mount Lemmon	Mount Lemmon Survey	·	610 m	MPC · JPL
734869	2015 BX_{561}	—	January 20, 2015	Haleakala	Pan-STARRS 1	·	2.3 km	MPC · JPL
734870	2015 BN_{563}	—	December 10, 2009	Mount Lemmon	Mount Lemmon Survey	·	1.3 km	MPC · JPL
734871	2015 BR_{564}	—	June 16, 2012	Haleakala	Pan-STARRS 1	·	1.3 km	MPC · JPL
734872	2015 BR_{565}	—	May 15, 2010	WISE	WISE	EOS	1.7 km	MPC · JPL
734873	2015 BE_{566}	—	March 19, 2004	Kitt Peak	Spacewatch	·	2.5 km	MPC · JPL
734874	2015 BL_{566}	—	April 2, 2006	Mount Lemmon	Mount Lemmon Survey	DOR	2.3 km	MPC · JPL
734875	2015 BT_{566}	—	November 22, 2008	Kitt Peak	Spacewatch	·	3.9 km	MPC · JPL
734876	2015 BS_{570}	—	May 13, 2010	WISE	WISE	·	2.8 km	MPC · JPL
734877	2015 BJ_{572}	—	May 17, 2005	Mount Lemmon	Mount Lemmon Survey	·	1.6 km	MPC · JPL
734878	2015 BW_{574}	—	January 18, 2015	ESA OGS	ESA OGS	ELF	2.9 km	MPC · JPL
734879	2015 BL_{577}	—	April 14, 2010	WISE	WISE	·	3.2 km	MPC · JPL
734880	2015 BQ_{593}	—	January 22, 2015	Haleakala	Pan-STARRS 1	·	2.3 km	MPC · JPL
734881	2015 BV_{593}	—	January 18, 2015	Haleakala	Pan-STARRS 1	·	2.0 km	MPC · JPL
734882	2015 BP_{594}	—	January 18, 2015	Mount Lemmon	Mount Lemmon Survey	·	2.4 km	MPC · JPL
734883	2015 BU_{594}	—	January 22, 2015	Haleakala	Pan-STARRS 1	·	2.2 km	MPC · JPL
734884	2015 BW_{594}	—	January 19, 2015	Mount Lemmon	Mount Lemmon Survey	BRA	1.1 km	MPC · JPL
734885	2015 BX_{594}	—	January 18, 2015	Haleakala	Pan-STARRS 1	·	2.1 km	MPC · JPL
734886	2015 BG_{601}	—	January 16, 2015	Haleakala	Pan-STARRS 1	·	1.5 km	MPC · JPL
734887	2015 BF_{606}	—	January 17, 2015	Mount Graham	Boyle, R. P.	·	1.2 km	MPC · JPL
734888	2015 BD_{607}	—	January 20, 2015	Haleakala	Pan-STARRS 1	·	530 m	MPC · JPL
734889	2015 BZ_{607}	—	January 18, 2015	Mount Lemmon	Mount Lemmon Survey	·	1.5 km	MPC · JPL
734890	2015 BW_{613}	—	January 16, 2015	Haleakala	Pan-STARRS 1	(5)	700 m	MPC · JPL
734891	2015 BK_{614}	—	January 22, 2015	Haleakala	Pan-STARRS 1	·	920 m	MPC · JPL
734892	2015 CT_{1}	—	January 31, 2004	Kitt Peak	Spacewatch	·	3.0 km	MPC · JPL
734893	2015 CC_{3}	—	February 1, 2009	Mount Lemmon	Mount Lemmon Survey	·	3.1 km	MPC · JPL
734894	2015 CE_{3}	—	January 20, 2015	Haleakala	Pan-STARRS 1	V	490 m	MPC · JPL
734895	2015 CV_{3}	—	November 16, 2009	Mount Lemmon	Mount Lemmon Survey	·	1.6 km	MPC · JPL
734896	2015 CC_{6}	—	March 18, 2001	Kitt Peak	Spacewatch	KOR	1.7 km	MPC · JPL
734897	2015 CJ_{6}	—	February 29, 2004	Kitt Peak	Spacewatch	VER	2.6 km	MPC · JPL
734898	2015 CO_{7}	—	January 20, 2015	Haleakala	Pan-STARRS 1	·	860 m	MPC · JPL
734899	2015 CQ_{8}	—	January 20, 2015	Kitt Peak	Spacewatch	·	2.0 km	MPC · JPL
734900	2015 CF_{13}	—	August 17, 2003	Palomar	NEAT	H	700 m	MPC · JPL

== 734901–735000 ==
back to top

Designation			Discovery			Properties		Ref
Permanent	Provisional	Named after	Date	Site	Discoverer(s)	Category	Diam.	Ref
734901	2015 CG_{15}	—	June 23, 2005	Palomar	NEAT	H	490 m	MPC · JPL
734902	2015 CG_{16}	—	March 27, 2008	Mount Lemmon	Mount Lemmon Survey	·	930 m	MPC · JPL
734903	2015 CV_{16}	—	January 16, 2015	Haleakala	Pan-STARRS 1	H	420 m	MPC · JPL
734904	2015 CK_{17}	—	February 14, 2004	Kitt Peak	Spacewatch	·	3.2 km	MPC · JPL
734905	2015 CF_{18}	—	January 1, 2009	Mount Lemmon	Mount Lemmon Survey	·	2.8 km	MPC · JPL
734906	2015 CW_{19}	—	February 9, 2015	Mount Lemmon	Mount Lemmon Survey	·	1.2 km	MPC · JPL
734907	2015 CY_{19}	—	February 9, 2015	Mount Lemmon	Mount Lemmon Survey	·	1.7 km	MPC · JPL
734908	2015 CL_{24}	—	January 12, 2011	Mount Lemmon	Mount Lemmon Survey	MAS	660 m	MPC · JPL
734909	2015 CN_{24}	—	February 18, 2010	Mount Lemmon	Mount Lemmon Survey	EOS	1.4 km	MPC · JPL
734910	2015 CA_{25}	—	October 1, 2013	Mount Lemmon	Mount Lemmon Survey	·	900 m	MPC · JPL
734911	2015 CV_{25}	—	March 10, 2005	Mount Lemmon	Mount Lemmon Survey	·	560 m	MPC · JPL
734912	2015 CX_{25}	—	March 14, 2004	Kitt Peak	Spacewatch	·	800 m	MPC · JPL
734913	2015 CZ_{26}	—	August 4, 2000	Haleakala	NEAT	·	1.2 km	MPC · JPL
734914	2015 CD_{28}	—	February 24, 2010	WISE	WISE	THB	3.5 km	MPC · JPL
734915	2015 CX_{29}	—	January 14, 2011	Mount Lemmon	Mount Lemmon Survey	NYS	940 m	MPC · JPL
734916	2015 CJ_{30}	—	October 22, 2003	Apache Point	SDSS Collaboration	·	3.4 km	MPC · JPL
734917	2015 CN_{30}	—	September 21, 2003	Kitt Peak	Spacewatch	·	3.2 km	MPC · JPL
734918	2015 CX_{30}	—	January 7, 2009	Kitt Peak	Spacewatch	VER	3.0 km	MPC · JPL
734919	2015 CE_{33}	—	January 19, 2015	Mount Lemmon	Mount Lemmon Survey	·	1.8 km	MPC · JPL
734920	2015 CN_{34}	—	January 12, 2010	Mount Lemmon	Mount Lemmon Survey	·	2.2 km	MPC · JPL
734921	2015 CB_{39}	—	February 10, 2010	WISE	WISE	·	1.3 km	MPC · JPL
734922	2015 CH_{39}	—	April 17, 2010	WISE	WISE	DOR	1.9 km	MPC · JPL
734923	2015 CJ_{39}	—	August 25, 2003	Cerro Tololo	Deep Ecliptic Survey	HOF	2.5 km	MPC · JPL
734924	2015 CY_{39}	—	April 24, 2004	Haleakala	NEAT	·	4.2 km	MPC · JPL
734925	2015 CX_{40}	—	January 30, 2011	Mount Lemmon	Mount Lemmon Survey	·	1.2 km	MPC · JPL
734926	2015 CY_{40}	—	November 6, 2008	Mount Lemmon	Mount Lemmon Survey	·	2.6 km	MPC · JPL
734927	2015 CA_{41}	—	October 18, 2003	Palomar	NEAT	·	680 m	MPC · JPL
734928	2015 CP_{41}	—	March 11, 2005	Kitt Peak	Spacewatch	EOS	1.9 km	MPC · JPL
734929	2015 CF_{42}	—	February 28, 2006	Mount Lemmon	Mount Lemmon Survey	·	2.1 km	MPC · JPL
734930	2015 CM_{45}	—	January 27, 2015	Haleakala	Pan-STARRS 1	·	1.2 km	MPC · JPL
734931	2015 CW_{45}	—	July 23, 2010	WISE	WISE	HYG	2.2 km	MPC · JPL
734932	2015 CF_{46}	—	April 2, 2005	Mount Lemmon	Mount Lemmon Survey	·	610 m	MPC · JPL
734933	2015 CD_{48}	—	January 29, 2015	Haleakala	Pan-STARRS 1	·	1.8 km	MPC · JPL
734934	2015 CG_{51}	—	March 20, 2001	Kitt Peak	Spacewatch	·	1.7 km	MPC · JPL
734935	2015 CU_{56}	—	August 23, 2007	Kitt Peak	Spacewatch	·	2.4 km	MPC · JPL
734936	2015 CV_{56}	—	October 17, 2012	Mount Lemmon	Mount Lemmon Survey	EOS	1.7 km	MPC · JPL
734937	2015 CJ_{57}	—	January 21, 2015	Haleakala	Pan-STARRS 1	·	1.2 km	MPC · JPL
734938	2015 CP_{57}	—	January 26, 2010	WISE	WISE	·	2.3 km	MPC · JPL
734939	2015 CU_{60}	—	December 4, 2008	Mount Lemmon	Mount Lemmon Survey	·	3.5 km	MPC · JPL
734940	2015 CB_{62}	—	February 24, 2010	WISE	WISE	·	1.9 km	MPC · JPL
734941	2015 CW_{67}	—	September 12, 2007	Mount Lemmon	Mount Lemmon Survey	·	2.7 km	MPC · JPL
734942	2015 CA_{68}	—	January 18, 2015	Haleakala	Pan-STARRS 1	·	1.7 km	MPC · JPL
734943	2015 CJ_{68}	—	January 22, 2015	Haleakala	Pan-STARRS 1	·	1.3 km	MPC · JPL
734944	2015 CT_{70}	—	January 22, 2015	Haleakala	Pan-STARRS 1	·	750 m	MPC · JPL
734945	2015 CO_{73}	—	February 10, 2015	Mount Lemmon	Mount Lemmon Survey	·	2.3 km	MPC · JPL
734946	2015 CB_{77}	—	February 11, 2015	Mount Lemmon	Mount Lemmon Survey	·	1.8 km	MPC · JPL
734947	2015 CV_{78}	—	February 12, 2015	Haleakala	Pan-STARRS 1	·	2.8 km	MPC · JPL
734948	2015 CQ_{81}	—	February 12, 2015	Haleakala	Pan-STARRS 1	·	2.7 km	MPC · JPL
734949	2015 DG_{2}	—	October 9, 2008	Mount Lemmon	Mount Lemmon Survey	·	2.9 km	MPC · JPL
734950	2015 DU_{2}	—	July 6, 2013	Haleakala	Pan-STARRS 1	·	900 m	MPC · JPL
734951	2015 DM_{4}	—	January 16, 2015	Haleakala	Pan-STARRS 1	·	1.8 km	MPC · JPL
734952	2015 DL_{5}	—	March 28, 2008	Mount Lemmon	Mount Lemmon Survey	MAS	490 m	MPC · JPL
734953	2015 DM_{8}	—	June 1, 2010	WISE	WISE	EUP	2.1 km	MPC · JPL
734954	2015 DY_{8}	—	June 5, 2010	WISE	WISE	·	2.8 km	MPC · JPL
734955	2015 DD_{9}	—	January 17, 2015	Haleakala	Pan-STARRS 1	·	1.1 km	MPC · JPL
734956	2015 DT_{10}	—	January 20, 2015	Haleakala	Pan-STARRS 1	·	710 m	MPC · JPL
734957	2015 DS_{13}	—	May 23, 2011	Mount Lemmon	Mount Lemmon Survey	·	2.6 km	MPC · JPL
734958	2015 DF_{18}	—	December 18, 2009	Mount Lemmon	Mount Lemmon Survey	·	1.6 km	MPC · JPL
734959	2015 DX_{18}	—	January 14, 2010	WISE	WISE	·	2.4 km	MPC · JPL
734960	2015 DP_{25}	—	October 23, 2001	Palomar	NEAT	·	2.9 km	MPC · JPL
734961	2015 DV_{26}	—	November 16, 2010	Mount Lemmon	Mount Lemmon Survey	·	580 m	MPC · JPL
734962	2015 DE_{28}	—	January 27, 2015	Haleakala	Pan-STARRS 1	·	900 m	MPC · JPL
734963	2015 DX_{29}	—	April 12, 2010	Mount Lemmon	Mount Lemmon Survey	·	2.0 km	MPC · JPL
734964	2015 DD_{30}	—	August 28, 2005	Kitt Peak	Spacewatch	T_{j} (2.99)	3.0 km	MPC · JPL
734965	2015 DE_{30}	—	January 13, 2004	Anderson Mesa	LONEOS	·	3.6 km	MPC · JPL
734966	2015 DT_{31}	—	December 2, 2010	Mount Lemmon	Mount Lemmon Survey	·	850 m	MPC · JPL
734967	2015 DA_{32}	—	December 13, 2007	Lulin	LUSS	·	2.3 km	MPC · JPL
734968	2015 DD_{32}	—	September 13, 2007	Mount Lemmon	Mount Lemmon Survey	EOS	1.6 km	MPC · JPL
734969	2015 DH_{33}	—	February 7, 2008	Kitt Peak	Spacewatch	V	540 m	MPC · JPL
734970	2015 DT_{47}	—	October 3, 2013	Haleakala	Pan-STARRS 1	·	1.1 km	MPC · JPL
734971	2015 DP_{52}	—	October 26, 2012	Mount Lemmon	Mount Lemmon Survey	·	3.1 km	MPC · JPL
734972	2015 DT_{54}	—	May 17, 2010	WISE	WISE	·	2.9 km	MPC · JPL
734973	2015 DE_{56}	—	January 20, 2015	Haleakala	Pan-STARRS 1	NYS	800 m	MPC · JPL
734974	2015 DJ_{56}	—	October 2, 2009	Mount Lemmon	Mount Lemmon Survey	·	1.5 km	MPC · JPL
734975	2015 DO_{59}	—	January 20, 2015	Haleakala	Pan-STARRS 1	·	1.1 km	MPC · JPL
734976	2015 DR_{64}	—	January 22, 2015	Haleakala	Pan-STARRS 1	·	2.1 km	MPC · JPL
734977	2015 DJ_{71}	—	February 16, 2015	Haleakala	Pan-STARRS 1	·	760 m	MPC · JPL
734978	2015 DM_{73}	—	January 22, 2015	Haleakala	Pan-STARRS 1	·	930 m	MPC · JPL
734979	2015 DV_{75}	—	January 1, 2009	Kitt Peak	Spacewatch	·	2.8 km	MPC · JPL
734980	2015 DS_{83}	—	March 27, 2008	Mount Lemmon	Mount Lemmon Survey	MAS	550 m	MPC · JPL
734981	2015 DX_{83}	—	September 13, 2007	Mount Lemmon	Mount Lemmon Survey	·	1.6 km	MPC · JPL
734982	2015 DP_{84}	—	February 25, 2006	Kitt Peak	Spacewatch	·	2.6 km	MPC · JPL
734983	2015 DJ_{91}	—	November 13, 2010	Kitt Peak	Spacewatch	·	720 m	MPC · JPL
734984	2015 DC_{92}	—	January 22, 2015	Haleakala	Pan-STARRS 1	·	2.1 km	MPC · JPL
734985	2015 DG_{95}	—	February 17, 2010	Mount Lemmon	Mount Lemmon Survey	(13314)	1.9 km	MPC · JPL
734986	2015 DB_{96}	—	January 21, 2015	Haleakala	Pan-STARRS 1	V	480 m	MPC · JPL
734987	2015 DF_{96}	—	July 26, 2006	Palomar	NEAT	·	600 m	MPC · JPL
734988	2015 DP_{96}	—	September 13, 1998	Kitt Peak	Spacewatch	·	790 m	MPC · JPL
734989	2015 DR_{96}	—	September 19, 2001	Socorro	LINEAR	EOS	2.2 km	MPC · JPL
734990	2015 DP_{98}	—	March 15, 2010	Mount Lemmon	Mount Lemmon Survey	·	1.7 km	MPC · JPL
734991	2015 DY_{98}	—	June 3, 2000	Kitt Peak	Spacewatch	·	2.1 km	MPC · JPL
734992	2015 DZ_{99}	—	April 15, 2010	Mount Lemmon	Mount Lemmon Survey	·	2.9 km	MPC · JPL
734993	2015 DQ_{101}	—	October 31, 2002	Palomar	NEAT	·	2.9 km	MPC · JPL
734994	2015 DY_{102}	—	October 25, 2013	Kitt Peak	Spacewatch	·	2.7 km	MPC · JPL
734995	2015 DD_{103}	—	October 28, 2005	Mount Lemmon	Mount Lemmon Survey	ADE	1.8 km	MPC · JPL
734996	2015 DJ_{103}	—	February 17, 2015	Haleakala	Pan-STARRS 1	·	2.4 km	MPC · JPL
734997	2015 DY_{103}	—	September 24, 2013	Mount Lemmon	Mount Lemmon Survey	PHO	750 m	MPC · JPL
734998	2015 DF_{105}	—	April 28, 2010	WISE	WISE	·	2.2 km	MPC · JPL
734999	2015 DW_{105}	—	October 20, 2007	Kitt Peak	Spacewatch	VER	2.3 km	MPC · JPL
735000	2015 DD_{106}	—	November 18, 2003	Kitt Peak	Spacewatch	·	690 m	MPC · JPL

back to top

== Meaning of names ==
As minor planet discoveries are confirmed, they are given a permanent number by the IAU's Minor Planet Center (MPC), and the discoverers can then submit names for them, following the IAU's naming conventions. The list below concerns those minor planets in the specified number-range that have received names, and explains the meanings of those names.

Official naming citations of newly named small Solar System bodies are approved and published in a bulletin by IAU's Working Group for Small Bodies Nomenclature (WGSBN). Before May 2021, citations were published in MPC's Minor Planet Circulars for many decades. Recent citations can also be found on the JPL Small-Body Database (SBDB). Until his death in 2016, German astronomer Lutz D. Schmadel compiled these citations into the Dictionary of Minor Planet Names (DMP) and regularly updated the collection.

Based on Paul Herget's The Names of the Minor Planets, Schmadel also researched the unclear origin of numerous asteroids, most of which had been named prior to World War II. This article incorporates text from this source, which is in the public domain: SBDB New namings may only be added to this list below after official publication as the preannouncement of names is condemned. The WGSBN publishes a comprehensive guideline for the naming rules of non-cometary small Solar System bodies.

Named minor planet	Provisional	This minor planet was named for...	Ref · Catalog
734551 Monin	2015 BS_{16}	Dmitry Monin (born 1973), telescope technical officer at the Dominion Astrophysical Observatory and at the Herzberg Astronomy and Astrophysics Research Centre of the National Research Council of Canada.	IAU · 734551
