= List of minor planets: 625001–626000 =

The following is a partial list of minor planets, running from minor-planet number 625001 through 626000, inclusive. The primary data for this and other partial lists is based on JPL's "Small-Body Orbital Elements" and data available from the Minor Planet Center. Critical list information is also provided by the MPC, unless otherwise specified from Lowell Observatory. A detailed description of the table's columns and additional sources are given on the main page including a complete list of every page in this series, and a statistical break-up on the dynamical classification of minor planets.

Also see the summary list of all named bodies in numerical and alphabetical order, and the corresponding naming citations for the number range of this particular list. New namings may only be added to this list after official publication, as the preannouncement of names is condemned by the Working Group for Small Bodies Nomenclature of the International Astronomical Union.

Near-Earth obj.	MBA (inner)	MBA (outer)	Centaur
Mars-crosser	MBA (middle)	Jupiter trojan	Trans-Neptunian obj.
Unclassified

== 625001–625100 ==
Designation			Discovery			Properties		Ref
Permanent	Provisional	Named after	Date	Site	Discoverer(s)	Category	Diam.	Ref
625001	2004 XP_{54}	—	December 10, 2004	Kitt Peak	Spacewatch	·	1.3 km	MPC · JPL
625002	2004 XF_{120}	—	December 15, 1999	Kitt Peak	Spacewatch	·	1.7 km	MPC · JPL
625003	2004 XN_{152}	—	December 15, 2004	Kitt Peak	Spacewatch	·	710 m	MPC · JPL
625004	2004 XC_{196}	—	February 9, 2013	Haleakala	Pan-STARRS 1	·	960 m	MPC · JPL
625005	2004 XH_{196}	—	April 28, 2011	Mount Lemmon	Mount Lemmon Survey	·	930 m	MPC · JPL
625006	2004 XS_{197}	—	December 31, 2008	Kitt Peak	Spacewatch	·	750 m	MPC · JPL
625007	2004 XV_{197}	—	December 8, 2015	Mount Lemmon	Mount Lemmon Survey	·	2.3 km	MPC · JPL
625008	2004 XE_{198}	—	May 25, 2015	Mount Lemmon	Mount Lemmon Survey	·	800 m	MPC · JPL
625009	2004 XW_{198}	—	October 8, 2015	Haleakala	Pan-STARRS 1	·	1.2 km	MPC · JPL
625010	2004 YW_{16}	—	December 19, 2004	Mount Lemmon	Mount Lemmon Survey	·	1.9 km	MPC · JPL
625011	2004 YS_{25}	—	December 19, 2004	Mount Lemmon	Mount Lemmon Survey	·	2.2 km	MPC · JPL
625012	2004 YT_{27}	—	December 16, 2004	Kitt Peak	Spacewatch	MAS	660 m	MPC · JPL
625013	2004 YP_{39}	—	February 13, 2013	Haleakala	Pan-STARRS 1	·	910 m	MPC · JPL
625014	2004 YK_{41}	—	December 19, 2004	Mount Lemmon	Mount Lemmon Survey	·	930 m	MPC · JPL
625015	2005 AG	—	January 3, 2005	Piszkéstető	K. Sárneczky	·	480 m	MPC · JPL
625016	2005 AB_{56}	—	January 15, 2005	Kitt Peak	Spacewatch	·	2.3 km	MPC · JPL
625017	2005 AT_{72}	—	January 15, 2005	Kitt Peak	Spacewatch	·	1.9 km	MPC · JPL
625018	2005 AD_{76}	—	January 15, 2005	Kitt Peak	Spacewatch	·	840 m	MPC · JPL
625019	2005 AN_{83}	—	November 11, 2010	Mount Lemmon	Mount Lemmon Survey	·	570 m	MPC · JPL
625020	2005 BE_{31}	—	January 16, 2005	Mauna Kea	Veillet, C.	·	660 m	MPC · JPL
625021	2005 BQ_{36}	—	January 16, 2005	Mauna Kea	Veillet, C.	L5	7.2 km	MPC · JPL
625022	2005 BO_{37}	—	November 24, 2003	Kitt Peak	Spacewatch	·	2.1 km	MPC · JPL
625023	2005 BM_{53}	—	September 12, 2007	Mount Lemmon	Mount Lemmon Survey	·	840 m	MPC · JPL
625024	2005 BG_{54}	—	February 4, 1995	Kitt Peak	Spacewatch	·	470 m	MPC · JPL
625025	2005 BP_{54}	—	March 29, 2012	Mount Lemmon	Mount Lemmon Survey	·	690 m	MPC · JPL
625026	2005 BE_{55}	—	April 5, 2016	Haleakala	Pan-STARRS 1	·	500 m	MPC · JPL
625027	2005 BV_{56}	—	July 11, 2018	Haleakala	Pan-STARRS 1	·	1.5 km	MPC · JPL
625028	2005 CQ_{42}	—	February 2, 2005	Kitt Peak	Spacewatch	·	550 m	MPC · JPL
625029	2005 CH_{55}	—	February 4, 2005	Mount Lemmon	Mount Lemmon Survey	·	520 m	MPC · JPL
625030	2005 CZ_{71}	—	December 20, 2004	Mount Lemmon	Mount Lemmon Survey	·	1.6 km	MPC · JPL
625031	2005 CB_{82}	—	February 9, 2005	Mount Lemmon	Mount Lemmon Survey	EUN	1.2 km	MPC · JPL
625032	2005 CM_{83}	—	November 20, 2014	Haleakala	Pan-STARRS 1	L5	7.0 km	MPC · JPL
625033	2005 CZ_{85}	—	July 12, 2015	Haleakala	Pan-STARRS 1	·	880 m	MPC · JPL
625034	2005 CC_{86}	—	January 13, 2016	Kitt Peak	Spacewatch	·	2.4 km	MPC · JPL
625035	2005 CG_{88}	—	September 3, 2013	Mount Lemmon	Mount Lemmon Survey	·	460 m	MPC · JPL
625036	2005 ER_{104}	—	January 13, 2005	Kitt Peak	Spacewatch	·	2.1 km	MPC · JPL
625037	2005 EG_{122}	—	March 8, 2005	Mount Lemmon	Mount Lemmon Survey	·	910 m	MPC · JPL
625038	2005 EJ_{123}	—	March 8, 2005	Kitt Peak	Spacewatch	·	1.2 km	MPC · JPL
625039	2005 EC_{149}	—	March 10, 2005	Kitt Peak	Spacewatch	·	840 m	MPC · JPL
625040	2005 EM_{164}	—	March 11, 2005	Kitt Peak	Spacewatch	H	390 m	MPC · JPL
625041	2005 EQ_{172}	—	March 8, 2005	Kitt Peak	Spacewatch	·	550 m	MPC · JPL
625042	2005 EK_{220}	—	March 11, 2005	Mount Lemmon	Mount Lemmon Survey	·	590 m	MPC · JPL
625043	2005 EX_{227}	—	December 20, 2009	Mount Lemmon	Mount Lemmon Survey	EOS	1.5 km	MPC · JPL
625044	2005 EP_{229}	—	March 10, 2005	Mount Lemmon	Mount Lemmon Survey	·	2.0 km	MPC · JPL
625045	2005 ED_{285}	—	March 12, 2005	Kitt Peak	Spacewatch	·	880 m	MPC · JPL
625046	2005 EO_{287}	—	March 7, 2005	Socorro	LINEAR	·	630 m	MPC · JPL
625047	2005 EV_{289}	—	May 21, 2015	Haleakala	Pan-STARRS 1	MRX	730 m	MPC · JPL
625048	2005 EW_{299}	—	March 10, 2005	Mount Lemmon	Mount Lemmon Survey	·	820 m	MPC · JPL
625049	2005 EN_{315}	—	March 11, 2005	Kitt Peak	Spacewatch	·	2.3 km	MPC · JPL
625050	2005 EM_{335}	—	March 13, 2005	Kitt Peak	Spacewatch	(5)	930 m	MPC · JPL
625051	2005 EX_{335}	—	March 1, 2009	Catalina	CSS	·	960 m	MPC · JPL
625052	2005 EH_{336}	—	March 13, 2005	Kitt Peak	Spacewatch	·	690 m	MPC · JPL
625053	2005 EM_{336}	—	August 28, 2006	Kitt Peak	Spacewatch	NYS	810 m	MPC · JPL
625054	2005 EZ_{336}	—	January 19, 2012	Haleakala	Pan-STARRS 1	·	550 m	MPC · JPL
625055	2005 EV_{337}	—	February 28, 2014	Haleakala	Pan-STARRS 1	·	1.5 km	MPC · JPL
625056	2005 EP_{342}	—	January 3, 2013	Haleakala	Pan-STARRS 1	·	1.2 km	MPC · JPL
625057	2005 EM_{344}	—	June 11, 2015	Haleakala	Pan-STARRS 1	·	1.3 km	MPC · JPL
625058	2005 EE_{345}	—	October 12, 2010	Mount Lemmon	Mount Lemmon Survey	·	430 m	MPC · JPL
625059	2005 EV_{346}	—	October 27, 2008	Kitt Peak	Spacewatch	·	1.1 km	MPC · JPL
625060	2005 EF_{349}	—	March 11, 2005	Kitt Peak	Deep Ecliptic Survey	·	540 m	MPC · JPL
625061	2005 EN_{349}	—	March 4, 2005	Mount Lemmon	Mount Lemmon Survey	EUN	920 m	MPC · JPL
625062	2005 FH_{17}	—	March 17, 2005	Kitt Peak	Spacewatch	·	560 m	MPC · JPL
625063	2005 FE_{18}	—	October 22, 2008	Mount Lemmon	Mount Lemmon Survey	·	2.0 km	MPC · JPL
625064	2005 FM_{18}	—	August 9, 2015	Haleakala	Pan-STARRS 1	·	910 m	MPC · JPL
625065	2005 FX_{18}	—	January 18, 2012	Mount Lemmon	Mount Lemmon Survey	NYS	800 m	MPC · JPL
625066	2005 FG_{19}	—	March 16, 2005	Mount Lemmon	Mount Lemmon Survey	·	1.9 km	MPC · JPL
625067	2005 FT_{19}	—	March 16, 2005	Mount Lemmon	Mount Lemmon Survey	·	770 m	MPC · JPL
625068	2005 FH_{20}	—	March 16, 2005	Mount Lemmon	Mount Lemmon Survey	BRG	1.2 km	MPC · JPL
625069	2005 GU_{5}	—	April 1, 2005	Kitt Peak	Spacewatch	·	3.3 km	MPC · JPL
625070	2005 GA_{15}	—	April 2, 2005	Mount Lemmon	Mount Lemmon Survey	THM	1.8 km	MPC · JPL
625071	2005 GC_{35}	—	April 2, 2005	Mount Lemmon	Mount Lemmon Survey	H	460 m	MPC · JPL
625072	2005 GX_{44}	—	March 9, 2005	Mount Lemmon	Mount Lemmon Survey	·	1.3 km	MPC · JPL
625073	2005 GW_{69}	—	March 4, 2005	Kitt Peak	Spacewatch	·	730 m	MPC · JPL
625074	2005 GV_{81}	—	October 24, 2008	Kitt Peak	Spacewatch	·	2.5 km	MPC · JPL
625075	2005 GC_{84}	—	March 16, 2005	Mount Lemmon	Mount Lemmon Survey	·	490 m	MPC · JPL
625076	2005 GG_{86}	—	April 4, 2005	Mount Lemmon	Mount Lemmon Survey	·	1.8 km	MPC · JPL
625077	2005 GP_{93}	—	April 6, 2005	Kitt Peak	Spacewatch	·	560 m	MPC · JPL
625078	2005 GJ_{96}	—	April 6, 2005	Mount Lemmon	Mount Lemmon Survey	·	740 m	MPC · JPL
625079	2005 GP_{118}	—	April 2, 2005	Kitt Peak	Spacewatch	THM	1.9 km	MPC · JPL
625080	2005 GY_{144}	—	April 11, 2005	Kitt Peak	Spacewatch	·	2.2 km	MPC · JPL
625081	2005 GE_{184}	—	March 10, 2005	Mount Lemmon	Mount Lemmon Survey	·	1.4 km	MPC · JPL
625082	2005 GV_{184}	—	April 10, 2005	Kitt Peak	Deep Ecliptic Survey	·	1.8 km	MPC · JPL
625083	2005 GR_{194}	—	February 18, 2005	La Silla	A. Boattini	NYS	930 m	MPC · JPL
625084	2005 GK_{200}	—	April 10, 2005	Kitt Peak	Deep Ecliptic Survey	·	1.5 km	MPC · JPL
625085	2005 GP_{213}	—	March 10, 2005	Mount Lemmon	Mount Lemmon Survey	·	2.1 km	MPC · JPL
625086	2005 GL_{218}	—	April 2, 2005	Mount Lemmon	Mount Lemmon Survey	·	500 m	MPC · JPL
625087	2005 GF_{220}	—	April 4, 2005	Mount Lemmon	Mount Lemmon Survey	·	2.3 km	MPC · JPL
625088	2005 GW_{230}	—	November 8, 2010	Mount Lemmon	Mount Lemmon Survey	·	570 m	MPC · JPL
625089	2005 GV_{231}	—	April 2, 2005	Kitt Peak	Spacewatch	·	790 m	MPC · JPL
625090	2005 GT_{232}	—	August 12, 2013	Haleakala	Pan-STARRS 1	·	490 m	MPC · JPL
625091	2005 GS_{233}	—	August 29, 2006	Kitt Peak	Spacewatch	(1338) (FLO)	430 m	MPC · JPL
625092	2005 GZ_{233}	—	April 4, 2005	Catalina	CSS	·	960 m	MPC · JPL
625093	2005 GA_{235}	—	November 19, 2015	Mount Lemmon	Mount Lemmon Survey	MAR	880 m	MPC · JPL
625094	2005 GS_{236}	—	April 10, 2005	Mount Lemmon	Mount Lemmon Survey	·	1.5 km	MPC · JPL
625095	2005 HC_{10}	—	April 11, 2005	Mount Lemmon	Mount Lemmon Survey	·	540 m	MPC · JPL
625096	2005 HQ_{11}	—	April 30, 2005	Kitt Peak	Spacewatch	·	1.7 km	MPC · JPL
625097	2005 HC_{12}	—	May 18, 2012	Haleakala	Pan-STARRS 1	V	480 m	MPC · JPL
625098	2005 JR_{13}	—	April 10, 2005	Mount Lemmon	Mount Lemmon Survey	DOR	1.8 km	MPC · JPL
625099	2005 JX_{26}	—	May 3, 2005	Kitt Peak	Spacewatch	·	1.8 km	MPC · JPL
625100	2005 JK_{33}	—	April 11, 2005	Mount Lemmon	Mount Lemmon Survey	·	1.2 km	MPC · JPL

== 625101–625200 ==
back to top

Designation			Discovery			Properties		Ref
Permanent	Provisional	Named after	Date	Site	Discoverer(s)	Category	Diam.	Ref
625101	2005 JJ_{45}	—	May 2, 2005	Kitt Peak	D. E. Trilling, A. S. Rivkin	H	380 m	MPC · JPL
625102	2005 JW_{113}	—	May 10, 2005	Kitt Peak	Spacewatch	·	690 m	MPC · JPL
625103	2005 JC_{127}	—	May 12, 2005	Mount Lemmon	Mount Lemmon Survey	·	870 m	MPC · JPL
625104	2005 JC_{130}	—	April 4, 2005	Mount Lemmon	Mount Lemmon Survey	·	540 m	MPC · JPL
625105	2005 JS_{137}	—	May 13, 2005	Kitt Peak	Spacewatch	·	520 m	MPC · JPL
625106	2005 JM_{164}	—	May 10, 2005	Kitt Peak	Spacewatch	·	1.2 km	MPC · JPL
625107	2005 JE_{169}	—	April 10, 2005	Mount Lemmon	Mount Lemmon Survey	·	2.6 km	MPC · JPL
625108	2005 JF_{172}	—	May 10, 2005	Cerro Tololo	Deep Ecliptic Survey	·	1.6 km	MPC · JPL
625109	2005 JU_{182}	—	May 8, 2005	Kitt Peak	Spacewatch	·	2.0 km	MPC · JPL
625110	2005 JE_{185}	—	May 15, 2005	Mount Lemmon	Mount Lemmon Survey	·	1.4 km	MPC · JPL
625111	2005 JF_{187}	—	May 3, 2005	Kitt Peak	Spacewatch	·	570 m	MPC · JPL
625112	2005 JH_{188}	—	May 3, 2005	Kitt Peak	Spacewatch	·	910 m	MPC · JPL
625113	2005 JJ_{189}	—	October 8, 2007	Mount Lemmon	Mount Lemmon Survey	·	2.2 km	MPC · JPL
625114	2005 JL_{190}	—	May 15, 2012	Mount Lemmon	Mount Lemmon Survey	·	550 m	MPC · JPL
625115	2005 JT_{192}	—	February 11, 2008	Mount Lemmon	Mount Lemmon Survey	·	590 m	MPC · JPL
625116	2005 JW_{192}	—	April 11, 2016	Haleakala	Pan-STARRS 1	·	2.6 km	MPC · JPL
625117	2005 KR_{15}	—	June 25, 2017	Haleakala	Pan-STARRS 1	·	2.2 km	MPC · JPL
625118	2005 LT_{33}	—	May 13, 2005	Mount Lemmon	Mount Lemmon Survey	·	1.4 km	MPC · JPL
625119	2005 LL_{55}	—	December 30, 2007	Mount Lemmon	Mount Lemmon Survey	·	1.2 km	MPC · JPL
625120	2005 LO_{56}	—	February 22, 2017	Mount Lemmon	Mount Lemmon Survey	·	1.2 km	MPC · JPL
625121	2005 MK_{20}	—	June 30, 2005	Kitt Peak	Spacewatch	·	450 m	MPC · JPL
625122	2005 ML_{30}	—	June 29, 2005	Kitt Peak	Spacewatch	·	1.6 km	MPC · JPL
625123	2005 MQ_{55}	—	April 30, 2008	Kitt Peak	Spacewatch	·	710 m	MPC · JPL
625124	2005 NZ_{11}	—	July 4, 2005	Kitt Peak	Spacewatch	·	650 m	MPC · JPL
625125	2005 NN_{18}	—	July 4, 2005	Mount Lemmon	Mount Lemmon Survey	·	860 m	MPC · JPL
625126	2005 NX_{18}	—	July 4, 2005	Mount Lemmon	Mount Lemmon Survey	·	1.7 km	MPC · JPL
625127	2005 NA_{22}	—	July 1, 2005	Kitt Peak	Spacewatch	·	500 m	MPC · JPL
625128	2005 NU_{24}	—	July 4, 2005	Kitt Peak	Spacewatch	·	1.1 km	MPC · JPL
625129	2005 NW_{30}	—	July 4, 2005	Mount Lemmon	Mount Lemmon Survey	·	2.5 km	MPC · JPL
625130	2005 NF_{45}	—	July 4, 2005	Palomar	NEAT	·	1.8 km	MPC · JPL
625131	2005 NB_{51}	—	July 6, 2005	Kitt Peak	Spacewatch	NYS	870 m	MPC · JPL
625132	2005 ND_{64}	—	July 1, 2005	Kitt Peak	Spacewatch	·	760 m	MPC · JPL
625133	2005 NG_{70}	—	July 4, 2005	Palomar	NEAT	·	1.7 km	MPC · JPL
625134	2005 NY_{78}	—	July 12, 2005	Mount Lemmon	Mount Lemmon Survey	·	710 m	MPC · JPL
625135	2005 NS_{95}	—	June 17, 2005	Mount Lemmon	Mount Lemmon Survey	NYS	680 m	MPC · JPL
625136	2005 NN_{96}	—	July 7, 2005	Kitt Peak	Spacewatch	·	810 m	MPC · JPL
625137	2005 NS_{101}	—	July 12, 2005	Mount Lemmon	Mount Lemmon Survey	·	640 m	MPC · JPL
625138	2005 NK_{106}	—	July 15, 2005	Kitt Peak	Spacewatch	·	590 m	MPC · JPL
625139	2005 NX_{110}	—	July 7, 2005	Mauna Kea	Veillet, C.	·	760 m	MPC · JPL
625140	2005 NS_{118}	—	July 3, 2005	Mount Lemmon	Mount Lemmon Survey	·	730 m	MPC · JPL
625141	2005 NB_{119}	—	July 7, 2005	Mauna Kea	Veillet, C.	·	460 m	MPC · JPL
625142	2005 NN_{127}	—	September 16, 2009	Kitt Peak	Spacewatch	·	760 m	MPC · JPL
625143	2005 NE_{131}	—	May 3, 2008	Mount Lemmon	Mount Lemmon Survey	·	490 m	MPC · JPL
625144	2005 NY_{131}	—	July 2, 2005	Kitt Peak	Spacewatch	(2076)	610 m	MPC · JPL
625145	2005 OQ_{18}	—	July 30, 2005	Palomar	NEAT	·	560 m	MPC · JPL
625146	2005 OL_{32}	—	July 26, 2005	Palomar	NEAT	·	1.7 km	MPC · JPL
625147	2005 OU_{32}	—	October 24, 2013	Mount Lemmon	Mount Lemmon Survey	·	920 m	MPC · JPL
625148	2005 OA_{33}	—	July 29, 2005	Palomar	NEAT	MAS	560 m	MPC · JPL
625149	2005 OU_{33}	—	August 19, 2010	Kitt Peak	Spacewatch	·	1.4 km	MPC · JPL
625150	2005 OB_{34}	—	March 31, 2011	Haleakala	Pan-STARRS 1	·	390 m	MPC · JPL
625151	2005 OT_{34}	—	July 26, 2005	Palomar	NEAT	·	1.3 km	MPC · JPL
625152	2005 PM	—	August 4, 2005	Socorro	LINEAR	·	1.2 km	MPC · JPL
625153	2005 PA_{30}	—	August 5, 2005	Palomar	NEAT	·	870 m	MPC · JPL
625154	2005 PS_{30}	—	July 8, 2005	Kitt Peak	Spacewatch	·	1.5 km	MPC · JPL
625155	2005 PU_{30}	—	August 6, 2005	Palomar	NEAT	·	640 m	MPC · JPL
625156	2005 QN	—	July 4, 2005	Palomar	NEAT	·	830 m	MPC · JPL
625157	2005 QQ_{6}	—	July 30, 2005	Palomar	NEAT	·	800 m	MPC · JPL
625158	2005 QH_{11}	—	July 31, 2005	Palomar	NEAT	·	700 m	MPC · JPL
625159	2005 QY_{25}	—	August 27, 2005	Kitt Peak	Spacewatch	·	850 m	MPC · JPL
625160	2005 QS_{39}	—	July 31, 2005	Palomar	NEAT	·	1.8 km	MPC · JPL
625161	2005 QX_{70}	—	August 26, 2005	Anderson Mesa	LONEOS	·	910 m	MPC · JPL
625162	2005 QA_{76}	—	August 29, 2005	Piszkéstető	K. Sárneczky, Kuli, Z.	·	1.4 km	MPC · JPL
625163	2005 QR_{77}	—	August 25, 2005	Palomar	NEAT	·	900 m	MPC · JPL
625164	2005 QK_{84}	—	August 30, 2005	Campo Imperatore	CINEOS	·	2.0 km	MPC · JPL
625165	2005 QB_{87}	—	August 30, 2005	Piszkéstető	K. Sárneczky, Kuli, Z.	·	1.4 km	MPC · JPL
625166	2005 QP_{88}	—	August 28, 2005	St. Véran	St. Veran	·	650 m	MPC · JPL
625167	2005 QM_{92}	—	August 26, 2005	Palomar	NEAT	·	1.6 km	MPC · JPL
625168	2005 QP_{100}	—	August 29, 2005	Kitt Peak	Spacewatch	·	1.2 km	MPC · JPL
625169	2005 QH_{106}	—	July 30, 2005	Palomar	NEAT	·	810 m	MPC · JPL
625170	2005 QN_{119}	—	August 28, 2005	Kitt Peak	Spacewatch	NYS	740 m	MPC · JPL
625171	2005 QF_{121}	—	August 28, 2005	Kitt Peak	Spacewatch	·	830 m	MPC · JPL
625172	2005 QH_{134}	—	August 28, 2005	Kitt Peak	Spacewatch	·	860 m	MPC · JPL
625173	2005 QY_{143}	—	August 26, 2005	Palomar	NEAT	·	680 m	MPC · JPL
625174	2005 QY_{147}	—	August 28, 2005	Siding Spring	SSS	·	1.9 km	MPC · JPL
625175	2005 QS_{154}	—	August 28, 2005	Goodricke-Pigott	R. A. Tucker	JUN	1.2 km	MPC · JPL
625176	2005 QR_{158}	—	August 27, 2005	Palomar	NEAT	·	790 m	MPC · JPL
625177	2005 QK_{160}	—	August 28, 2005	Kitt Peak	Spacewatch	·	590 m	MPC · JPL
625178	2005 QN_{169}	—	August 30, 2005	Palomar	NEAT	·	2.9 km	MPC · JPL
625179	2005 QO_{176}	—	August 29, 2005	Palomar	NEAT	JUN	820 m	MPC · JPL
625180	2005 QX_{179}	—	August 26, 2005	Palomar	NEAT	·	1.2 km	MPC · JPL
625181	2005 QL_{182}	—	August 31, 2005	Palomar	NEAT	·	1.3 km	MPC · JPL
625182	2005 QB_{186}	—	August 30, 2005	Mauna Kea	P. A. Wiegert	(1547)	1.0 km	MPC · JPL
625183	2005 QY_{186}	—	August 27, 2005	Palomar	NEAT	MRX	860 m	MPC · JPL
625184	2005 QK_{187}	—	August 30, 2005	Kitt Peak	Spacewatch	NYS	810 m	MPC · JPL
625185	2005 QP_{188}	—	August 26, 2005	Palomar	NEAT	JUN	880 m	MPC · JPL
625186	2005 QP_{189}	—	August 28, 2005	Kitt Peak	Spacewatch	MAS	540 m	MPC · JPL
625187	2005 QY_{189}	—	August 30, 2005	Kitt Peak	Spacewatch	AGN	800 m	MPC · JPL
625188	2005 QX_{193}	—	August 14, 2012	Haleakala	Pan-STARRS 1	·	720 m	MPC · JPL
625189	2005 QR_{194}	—	May 3, 2008	Mount Lemmon	Mount Lemmon Survey	·	490 m	MPC · JPL
625190	2005 QS_{194}	—	August 28, 2005	Kitt Peak	Spacewatch	·	1.1 km	MPC · JPL
625191	2005 QB_{195}	—	August 30, 2005	Kitt Peak	Spacewatch	·	770 m	MPC · JPL
625192	2005 QK_{196}	—	May 18, 2015	Haleakala	Pan-STARRS 1	·	770 m	MPC · JPL
625193	2005 QP_{197}	—	May 13, 2008	Kitt Peak	Spacewatch	·	1.2 km	MPC · JPL
625194	2005 QX_{197}	—	August 31, 2005	Kitt Peak	Spacewatch	NYS	770 m	MPC · JPL
625195	2005 QM_{198}	—	August 24, 2005	Palomar	NEAT	·	500 m	MPC · JPL
625196	2005 QS_{198}	—	September 21, 2012	Catalina	CSS	·	600 m	MPC · JPL
625197	2005 QY_{198}	—	May 21, 2015	Haleakala	Pan-STARRS 1	·	780 m	MPC · JPL
625198	2005 QW_{201}	—	August 31, 2005	Kitt Peak	Spacewatch	NYS	880 m	MPC · JPL
625199	2005 QG_{202}	—	July 14, 2016	Haleakala	Pan-STARRS 1	V	450 m	MPC · JPL
625200	2005 QA_{204}	—	March 22, 2015	Haleakala	Pan-STARRS 1	·	2.1 km	MPC · JPL

== 625201–625300 ==
back to top

Designation			Discovery			Properties		Ref
Permanent	Provisional	Named after	Date	Site	Discoverer(s)	Category	Diam.	Ref
625201	2005 QP_{205}	—	August 29, 2005	Kitt Peak	Spacewatch	·	1.3 km	MPC · JPL
625202	2005 QQ_{205}	—	August 31, 2005	Kitt Peak	Spacewatch	·	880 m	MPC · JPL
625203	2005 RY_{4}	—	September 6, 2005	Uccle	T. Pauwels	·	2.3 km	MPC · JPL
625204	2005 RZ_{28}	—	September 13, 2005	Kitt Peak	Spacewatch	·	870 m	MPC · JPL
625205	2005 RA_{42}	—	September 14, 2005	Kitt Peak	Spacewatch	·	1.6 km	MPC · JPL
625206	2005 RW_{46}	—	September 27, 2005	Apache Point	SDSS Collaboration	DOR	1.3 km	MPC · JPL
625207	2005 RB_{47}	—	October 3, 2005	Apache Point	SDSS Collaboration	GEF	740 m	MPC · JPL
625208	2005 RD_{47}	—	September 28, 2005	Apache Point	SDSS Collaboration	·	1.3 km	MPC · JPL
625209	2005 RD_{53}	—	May 31, 2008	Mount Lemmon	Mount Lemmon Survey	·	980 m	MPC · JPL
625210	2005 RJ_{53}	—	September 23, 2011	Mount Lemmon	Mount Lemmon Survey	·	2.1 km	MPC · JPL
625211	2005 RN_{53}	—	September 13, 2005	Kitt Peak	Spacewatch	·	910 m	MPC · JPL
625212	2005 RT_{54}	—	March 13, 2007	Mount Lemmon	Mount Lemmon Survey	·	910 m	MPC · JPL
625213	2005 RR_{56}	—	September 14, 2005	Kitt Peak	Spacewatch	·	930 m	MPC · JPL
625214	2005 RZ_{58}	—	August 26, 2012	Haleakala	Pan-STARRS 1	·	480 m	MPC · JPL
625215	2005 SP_{4}	—	September 24, 2005	Vallemare Borbona	V. S. Casulli	·	970 m	MPC · JPL
625216	2005 SB_{10}	—	August 31, 2005	Kitt Peak	Spacewatch	·	1.2 km	MPC · JPL
625217	2005 SH_{11}	—	August 30, 2005	Palomar	NEAT	·	1.5 km	MPC · JPL
625218	2005 SP_{25}	—	September 28, 2005	Wrightwood	J. W. Young	NYS	690 m	MPC · JPL
625219	2005 SE_{27}	—	September 23, 2005	Kitt Peak	Spacewatch	·	560 m	MPC · JPL
625220	2005 SX_{27}	—	September 23, 2005	Kitt Peak	Spacewatch	·	1.3 km	MPC · JPL
625221	2005 SG_{34}	—	September 23, 2005	Kitt Peak	Spacewatch	·	860 m	MPC · JPL
625222	2005 SM_{35}	—	September 23, 2005	Kitt Peak	Spacewatch	·	920 m	MPC · JPL
625223	2005 SB_{45}	—	September 24, 2005	Kitt Peak	Spacewatch	·	600 m	MPC · JPL
625224	2005 SZ_{45}	—	September 24, 2005	Kitt Peak	Spacewatch	·	1.2 km	MPC · JPL
625225	2005 SC_{46}	—	September 24, 2005	Kitt Peak	Spacewatch	·	1.4 km	MPC · JPL
625226	2005 SD_{72}	—	September 23, 2005	Catalina	CSS	·	1.7 km	MPC · JPL
625227	2005 SU_{80}	—	September 24, 2005	Kitt Peak	Spacewatch	·	630 m	MPC · JPL
625228	2005 SZ_{83}	—	September 24, 2005	Kitt Peak	Spacewatch	·	970 m	MPC · JPL
625229	2005 SU_{97}	—	September 30, 2005	Anderson Mesa	LONEOS	·	760 m	MPC · JPL
625230	2005 SE_{106}	—	August 29, 2005	Kitt Peak	Spacewatch	MAS	360 m	MPC · JPL
625231	2005 SZ_{117}	—	September 28, 2005	Palomar	NEAT	·	700 m	MPC · JPL
625232	2005 SA_{122}	—	September 29, 2005	Kitt Peak	Spacewatch	NEM	2.0 km	MPC · JPL
625233	2005 SQ_{140}	—	September 25, 2005	Kitt Peak	Spacewatch	NYS	870 m	MPC · JPL
625234	2005 SG_{142}	—	September 25, 2005	Kitt Peak	Spacewatch	·	1.3 km	MPC · JPL
625235	2005 SP_{145}	—	September 25, 2005	Kitt Peak	Spacewatch	MAS	370 m	MPC · JPL
625236	2005 SV_{154}	—	January 21, 2002	Anderson Mesa	LONEOS	·	1.4 km	MPC · JPL
625237	2005 SS_{156}	—	September 26, 2005	Kitt Peak	Spacewatch	MAS	530 m	MPC · JPL
625238	2005 SS_{160}	—	September 26, 2005	Kitt Peak	Spacewatch	·	1.6 km	MPC · JPL
625239	2005 SP_{168}	—	September 29, 2005	Kitt Peak	Spacewatch	·	1.2 km	MPC · JPL
625240	2005 SE_{173}	—	September 29, 2005	Kitt Peak	Spacewatch	·	1.7 km	MPC · JPL
625241	2005 SB_{177}	—	September 29, 2005	Kitt Peak	Spacewatch	·	1.6 km	MPC · JPL
625242	2005 SX_{183}	—	September 24, 2005	Kitt Peak	Spacewatch	·	660 m	MPC · JPL
625243	2005 SZ_{191}	—	September 29, 2005	Mount Lemmon	Mount Lemmon Survey	MAS	570 m	MPC · JPL
625244	2005 SF_{196}	—	September 30, 2005	Kitt Peak	Spacewatch	·	790 m	MPC · JPL
625245	2005 SL_{196}	—	September 30, 2005	Kitt Peak	Spacewatch	·	1.0 km	MPC · JPL
625246	2005 SM_{204}	—	September 30, 2005	Mount Lemmon	Mount Lemmon Survey	·	800 m	MPC · JPL
625247	2005 SH_{213}	—	September 30, 2005	Mount Lemmon	Mount Lemmon Survey	MAS	520 m	MPC · JPL
625248	2005 SK_{234}	—	August 29, 2005	Kitt Peak	Spacewatch	·	1.0 km	MPC · JPL
625249	2005 SU_{243}	—	September 30, 2005	Anderson Mesa	LONEOS	·	860 m	MPC · JPL
625250	2005 SB_{249}	—	September 30, 2005	Mount Lemmon	Mount Lemmon Survey	·	1.7 km	MPC · JPL
625251	2005 SF_{250}	—	September 23, 2005	Catalina	CSS	·	1.3 km	MPC · JPL
625252	2005 SZ_{261}	—	August 31, 1998	Kitt Peak	Spacewatch	·	1.0 km	MPC · JPL
625253	2005 SH_{268}	—	September 30, 2005	Palomar	NEAT	H	490 m	MPC · JPL
625254	2005 SN_{268}	—	September 23, 2005	Kitt Peak	Spacewatch	·	1.3 km	MPC · JPL
625255	2005 SQ_{268}	—	September 24, 2005	Kitt Peak	Spacewatch	·	1.2 km	MPC · JPL
625256	2005 SY_{268}	—	September 25, 2005	Kitt Peak	Spacewatch	·	880 m	MPC · JPL
625257	2005 SH_{272}	—	August 26, 2005	Palomar	NEAT	·	680 m	MPC · JPL
625258	2005 SN_{279}	—	September 23, 2005	Kitt Peak	Spacewatch	·	560 m	MPC · JPL
625259	2005 SB_{284}	—	November 6, 2005	Kitt Peak	Spacewatch	·	1.5 km	MPC · JPL
625260	2005 SD_{286}	—	September 28, 2005	Apache Point	SDSS Collaboration	·	1.3 km	MPC · JPL
625261	2005 SZ_{287}	—	October 1, 2005	Apache Point	SDSS Collaboration	·	1.4 km	MPC · JPL
625262	2005 SE_{295}	—	September 30, 2005	Palomar	NEAT	·	2.2 km	MPC · JPL
625263	2005 ST_{295}	—	September 29, 2005	Kitt Peak	Spacewatch	·	1.1 km	MPC · JPL
625264	2005 SY_{295}	—	November 20, 2009	Mount Lemmon	Mount Lemmon Survey	·	890 m	MPC · JPL
625265	2005 SM_{296}	—	August 3, 2014	Haleakala	Pan-STARRS 1	·	1.4 km	MPC · JPL
625266	2005 SK_{297}	—	September 27, 2005	Kitt Peak	Spacewatch	·	770 m	MPC · JPL
625267	2005 SM_{298}	—	January 4, 2016	Haleakala	Pan-STARRS 1	·	450 m	MPC · JPL
625268	2005 SD_{299}	—	September 23, 2015	Haleakala	Pan-STARRS 1	H	420 m	MPC · JPL
625269	2005 SS_{300}	—	September 30, 2005	Mauna Kea	A. Boattini	·	950 m	MPC · JPL
625270	2005 SO_{301}	—	September 23, 2005	Kitt Peak	Spacewatch	NYS	820 m	MPC · JPL
625271	2005 SO_{302}	—	September 25, 2005	Kitt Peak	Spacewatch	·	970 m	MPC · JPL
625272	2005 TK_{1}	—	August 31, 2005	Palomar	NEAT	·	800 m	MPC · JPL
625273	2005 TD_{2}	—	September 29, 2005	Anderson Mesa	LONEOS	NYS	790 m	MPC · JPL
625274	2005 TJ_{2}	—	August 31, 2005	Kitt Peak	Spacewatch	DOR	1.7 km	MPC · JPL
625275	2005 TD_{3}	—	September 29, 2005	Kitt Peak	Spacewatch	·	660 m	MPC · JPL
625276	2005 TC_{21}	—	October 1, 2005	Mount Lemmon	Mount Lemmon Survey	·	1.3 km	MPC · JPL
625277	2005 TS_{21}	—	September 23, 2005	Kitt Peak	Spacewatch	NYS	950 m	MPC · JPL
625278	2005 TF_{23}	—	September 24, 2005	Kitt Peak	Spacewatch	·	850 m	MPC · JPL
625279	2005 TC_{25}	—	October 1, 2005	Mount Lemmon	Mount Lemmon Survey	·	1.6 km	MPC · JPL
625280	2005 TJ_{32}	—	August 31, 2005	Palomar	NEAT	·	1.5 km	MPC · JPL
625281	2005 TQ_{39}	—	October 1, 2005	Kitt Peak	Spacewatch	MAS	500 m	MPC · JPL
625282	2005 TA_{40}	—	May 22, 2001	Cerro Tololo	Deep Ecliptic Survey	NYS	740 m	MPC · JPL
625283	2005 TA_{52}	—	October 1, 2005	Mount Lemmon	Mount Lemmon Survey	·	1.3 km	MPC · JPL
625284	2005 TK_{60}	—	October 3, 2005	Kitt Peak	Spacewatch	·	1.3 km	MPC · JPL
625285	2005 TD_{69}	—	August 30, 2005	Kitt Peak	Spacewatch	·	1.1 km	MPC · JPL
625286	2005 TB_{82}	—	October 3, 2005	Kitt Peak	Spacewatch	·	1.2 km	MPC · JPL
625287	2005 TH_{85}	—	October 3, 2005	Kitt Peak	Spacewatch	·	1.5 km	MPC · JPL
625288	2005 TM_{89}	—	October 5, 2005	Mount Lemmon	Mount Lemmon Survey	·	760 m	MPC · JPL
625289	2005 TH_{94}	—	October 6, 2005	Kitt Peak	Spacewatch	H	400 m	MPC · JPL
625290	2005 TS_{94}	—	May 23, 2001	Cerro Tololo	Deep Ecliptic Survey	·	710 m	MPC · JPL
625291	2005 TV_{108}	—	October 7, 2005	Kitt Peak	Spacewatch	·	1.0 km	MPC · JPL
625292	2005 TL_{113}	—	October 7, 2005	Kitt Peak	Spacewatch	·	1.5 km	MPC · JPL
625293	2005 TK_{118}	—	October 7, 2005	Kitt Peak	Spacewatch	·	930 m	MPC · JPL
625294	2005 TM_{121}	—	October 7, 2005	Catalina	CSS	NYS	850 m	MPC · JPL
625295	2005 TB_{123}	—	October 7, 2005	Kitt Peak	Spacewatch	HOF	1.8 km	MPC · JPL
625296	2005 TX_{123}	—	October 7, 2005	Mount Lemmon	Mount Lemmon Survey	AGN	1.1 km	MPC · JPL
625297	2005 TR_{126}	—	September 29, 2005	Mount Lemmon	Mount Lemmon Survey	MAS	450 m	MPC · JPL
625298	2005 TS_{130}	—	October 7, 2005	Kitt Peak	Spacewatch	·	1.4 km	MPC · JPL
625299	2005 TO_{132}	—	October 1, 2005	Mount Lemmon	Mount Lemmon Survey	·	1.3 km	MPC · JPL
625300	2005 TC_{139}	—	October 8, 2005	Kitt Peak	Spacewatch	·	430 m	MPC · JPL

== 625301–625400 ==
back to top

Designation			Discovery			Properties		Ref
Permanent	Provisional	Named after	Date	Site	Discoverer(s)	Category	Diam.	Ref
625301	2005 TQ_{153}	—	September 26, 2005	Kitt Peak	Spacewatch	·	1.4 km	MPC · JPL
625302	2005 TL_{155}	—	October 9, 2005	Kitt Peak	Spacewatch	·	1.3 km	MPC · JPL
625303	2005 TA_{162}	—	October 9, 2005	Kitt Peak	Spacewatch	V	550 m	MPC · JPL
625304	2005 TF_{167}	—	October 9, 2005	Kitt Peak	Spacewatch	·	1.7 km	MPC · JPL
625305	2005 TY_{167}	—	October 9, 2005	Kitt Peak	Spacewatch	·	1.3 km	MPC · JPL
625306	2005 TN_{170}	—	October 11, 2005	Kitt Peak	Spacewatch	·	1.5 km	MPC · JPL
625307	2005 TE_{181}	—	October 1, 2005	Mount Lemmon	Mount Lemmon Survey	·	1.3 km	MPC · JPL
625308	2005 TM_{198}	—	October 5, 2005	Kitt Peak	Spacewatch	·	1.5 km	MPC · JPL
625309	2005 TT_{198}	—	October 1, 2005	Mount Lemmon	Mount Lemmon Survey	MAS	520 m	MPC · JPL
625310	2005 TP_{199}	—	October 4, 2005	Catalina	CSS	·	600 m	MPC · JPL
625311	2005 TR_{200}	—	May 27, 2008	Mount Lemmon	Mount Lemmon Survey	·	620 m	MPC · JPL
625312	2005 TT_{201}	—	October 1, 2005	Catalina	CSS	·	1.3 km	MPC · JPL
625313	2005 TU_{202}	—	October 11, 2005	Kitt Peak	Spacewatch	·	870 m	MPC · JPL
625314	2005 TA_{203}	—	July 14, 2016	Haleakala	Pan-STARRS 1	·	890 m	MPC · JPL
625315	2005 TZ_{204}	—	March 28, 2011	Catalina	CSS	·	920 m	MPC · JPL
625316	2005 TO_{205}	—	October 11, 2005	Kitt Peak	Spacewatch	·	1.8 km	MPC · JPL
625317	2005 TR_{205}	—	October 10, 2005	Catalina	CSS	(2076)	850 m	MPC · JPL
625318	2005 TJ_{206}	—	October 1, 2005	Kitt Peak	Spacewatch	·	1.5 km	MPC · JPL
625319	2005 TR_{206}	—	October 3, 2005	Kitt Peak	Spacewatch	NYS	740 m	MPC · JPL
625320	2005 TS_{206}	—	September 17, 2014	Haleakala	Pan-STARRS 1	AGN	880 m	MPC · JPL
625321	2005 TA_{211}	—	January 28, 2014	Mount Lemmon	Mount Lemmon Survey	·	840 m	MPC · JPL
625322	2005 TM_{211}	—	August 31, 2005	Palomar	NEAT	·	1.1 km	MPC · JPL
625323	2005 UC_{21}	—	October 9, 2005	Kitt Peak	Spacewatch	·	1.5 km	MPC · JPL
625324	2005 US_{32}	—	October 24, 2005	Kitt Peak	Spacewatch	MAS	500 m	MPC · JPL
625325	2005 UY_{46}	—	October 22, 2005	Kitt Peak	Spacewatch	·	600 m	MPC · JPL
625326	2005 UD_{61}	—	October 25, 2005	Mount Lemmon	Mount Lemmon Survey	·	890 m	MPC · JPL
625327	2005 UE_{68}	—	October 23, 2005	Catalina	CSS	·	630 m	MPC · JPL
625328	2005 UQ_{75}	—	September 29, 2005	Catalina	CSS	·	1.5 km	MPC · JPL
625329	2005 UW_{87}	—	October 22, 2005	Kitt Peak	Spacewatch	·	1.1 km	MPC · JPL
625330	2005 UP_{88}	—	October 22, 2005	Kitt Peak	Spacewatch	·	1.2 km	MPC · JPL
625331	2005 UU_{89}	—	October 22, 2005	Kitt Peak	Spacewatch	·	1.5 km	MPC · JPL
625332	2005 US_{98}	—	October 22, 2005	Kitt Peak	Spacewatch	·	1 km	MPC · JPL
625333	2005 UJ_{100}	—	October 22, 2005	Kitt Peak	Spacewatch	NYS	840 m	MPC · JPL
625334	2005 UM_{102}	—	October 22, 2005	Kitt Peak	Spacewatch	NYS	720 m	MPC · JPL
625335	2005 UG_{118}	—	October 24, 2005	Kitt Peak	Spacewatch	·	1.4 km	MPC · JPL
625336	2005 UR_{118}	—	October 24, 2005	Kitt Peak	Spacewatch	·	870 m	MPC · JPL
625337	2005 UD_{123}	—	October 24, 2005	Kitt Peak	Spacewatch	·	1.1 km	MPC · JPL
625338	2005 UM_{123}	—	October 24, 2005	Kitt Peak	Spacewatch	·	770 m	MPC · JPL
625339	2005 UB_{125}	—	October 24, 2005	Kitt Peak	Spacewatch	·	1.5 km	MPC · JPL
625340	2005 UV_{143}	—	October 7, 2005	Kitt Peak	Spacewatch	·	540 m	MPC · JPL
625341	2005 UN_{145}	—	October 26, 2005	Kitt Peak	Spacewatch	·	1.7 km	MPC · JPL
625342	2005 UC_{146}	—	October 26, 2005	Kitt Peak	Spacewatch	AGN	890 m	MPC · JPL
625343	2005 UY_{150}	—	October 26, 2005	Kitt Peak	Spacewatch	MAS	440 m	MPC · JPL
625344	2005 UY_{151}	—	October 1, 2005	Mount Lemmon	Mount Lemmon Survey	NYS	840 m	MPC · JPL
625345	2005 UN_{159}	—	September 24, 2005	Kitt Peak	Spacewatch	NYS	840 m	MPC · JPL
625346	2005 UM_{163}	—	October 24, 2005	Kitt Peak	Spacewatch	AGN	990 m	MPC · JPL
625347	2005 UK_{167}	—	October 24, 2005	Kitt Peak	Spacewatch	THM	1.5 km	MPC · JPL
625348	2005 UV_{171}	—	October 24, 2005	Kitt Peak	Spacewatch	·	860 m	MPC · JPL
625349	2005 UQ_{174}	—	October 24, 2005	Kitt Peak	Spacewatch	HOF	2.3 km	MPC · JPL
625350	2005 UB_{181}	—	October 24, 2005	Kitt Peak	Spacewatch	·	1.5 km	MPC · JPL
625351	2005 UV_{186}	—	October 26, 2005	Kitt Peak	Spacewatch	·	1.3 km	MPC · JPL
625352	2005 UV_{192}	—	September 30, 2005	Mount Lemmon	Mount Lemmon Survey	·	1.6 km	MPC · JPL
625353	2005 UO_{197}	—	October 25, 2005	Kitt Peak	Spacewatch	·	1.4 km	MPC · JPL
625354	2005 US_{206}	—	October 12, 2005	Kitt Peak	Spacewatch	·	1.5 km	MPC · JPL
625355	2005 UK_{208}	—	October 27, 2005	Kitt Peak	Spacewatch	·	1.7 km	MPC · JPL
625356	2005 UZ_{210}	—	October 27, 2005	Kitt Peak	Spacewatch	MAS	520 m	MPC · JPL
625357	2005 UP_{218}	—	October 25, 2005	Kitt Peak	Spacewatch	DOR	1.7 km	MPC · JPL
625358	2005 UD_{222}	—	October 25, 2005	Kitt Peak	Spacewatch	·	1.5 km	MPC · JPL
625359	2005 UE_{227}	—	October 25, 2005	Kitt Peak	Spacewatch	·	800 m	MPC · JPL
625360	2005 UL_{233}	—	October 25, 2005	Kitt Peak	Spacewatch	HOF	1.6 km	MPC · JPL
625361	2005 UV_{240}	—	October 25, 2005	Kitt Peak	Spacewatch	·	820 m	MPC · JPL
625362	2005 UD_{241}	—	October 25, 2005	Kitt Peak	Spacewatch	·	1.5 km	MPC · JPL
625363	2005 UZ_{245}	—	September 28, 2000	Kitt Peak	Spacewatch	·	1.6 km	MPC · JPL
625364	2005 UE_{246}	—	October 27, 2005	Mount Lemmon	Mount Lemmon Survey	·	1.6 km	MPC · JPL
625365	2005 UR_{247}	—	October 1, 2005	Mount Lemmon	Mount Lemmon Survey	NEM	2.0 km	MPC · JPL
625366	2005 UB_{251}	—	September 30, 2005	Catalina	CSS	·	830 m	MPC · JPL
625367	2005 UP_{257}	—	October 25, 2005	Kitt Peak	Spacewatch	HOF	1.9 km	MPC · JPL
625368	2005 UT_{261}	—	October 26, 2005	Kitt Peak	Spacewatch	·	390 m	MPC · JPL
625369	2005 UC_{264}	—	October 23, 2005	Catalina	CSS	DOR	1.8 km	MPC · JPL
625370	2005 US_{267}	—	October 27, 2005	Kitt Peak	Spacewatch	·	820 m	MPC · JPL
625371	2005 UH_{276}	—	January 9, 1999	Kitt Peak	Spacewatch	MAS	600 m	MPC · JPL
625372	2005 UP_{278}	—	October 24, 2005	Kitt Peak	Spacewatch	·	1.9 km	MPC · JPL
625373	2005 UL_{282}	—	October 26, 2005	Kitt Peak	Spacewatch	·	800 m	MPC · JPL
625374	2005 UV_{290}	—	October 26, 2005	Kitt Peak	Spacewatch	·	610 m	MPC · JPL
625375	2005 US_{297}	—	October 26, 2005	Kitt Peak	Spacewatch	·	690 m	MPC · JPL
625376	2005 UN_{308}	—	October 26, 2005	Kitt Peak	Spacewatch	·	1.2 km	MPC · JPL
625377	2005 UL_{315}	—	September 13, 2005	Kitt Peak	Spacewatch	V	480 m	MPC · JPL
625378	2005 UF_{318}	—	October 27, 2005	Kitt Peak	Spacewatch	·	480 m	MPC · JPL
625379	2005 UP_{325}	—	October 1, 2005	Kitt Peak	Spacewatch	·	860 m	MPC · JPL
625380	2005 UH_{329}	—	October 28, 2005	Mount Lemmon	Mount Lemmon Survey	·	980 m	MPC · JPL
625381	2005 UJ_{331}	—	October 6, 2005	Kitt Peak	Spacewatch	·	710 m	MPC · JPL
625382	2005 UP_{331}	—	October 29, 2005	Kitt Peak	Spacewatch	·	1.5 km	MPC · JPL
625383	2005 UM_{333}	—	October 29, 2005	Mount Lemmon	Mount Lemmon Survey	·	1.6 km	MPC · JPL
625384	2005 UA_{335}	—	October 29, 2005	Mount Lemmon	Mount Lemmon Survey	·	880 m	MPC · JPL
625385	2005 UU_{343}	—	October 29, 2005	Kitt Peak	Spacewatch	·	720 m	MPC · JPL
625386	2005 UX_{343}	—	October 29, 2005	Kitt Peak	Spacewatch	·	1.5 km	MPC · JPL
625387	2005 UE_{345}	—	October 29, 2005	Mount Lemmon	Mount Lemmon Survey	·	1.2 km	MPC · JPL
625388	2005 UK_{345}	—	October 29, 2005	Mount Lemmon	Mount Lemmon Survey	·	1.6 km	MPC · JPL
625389	2005 UX_{345}	—	October 24, 2005	Kitt Peak	Spacewatch	MAS	530 m	MPC · JPL
625390	2005 UC_{367}	—	October 22, 2005	Kitt Peak	Spacewatch	·	980 m	MPC · JPL
625391	2005 UJ_{370}	—	October 27, 2005	Kitt Peak	Spacewatch	·	1.2 km	MPC · JPL
625392	2005 UU_{373}	—	September 11, 2001	Kitt Peak	Spacewatch	·	820 m	MPC · JPL
625393	2005 UR_{374}	—	October 27, 2005	Kitt Peak	Spacewatch	MAS	570 m	MPC · JPL
625394	2005 UF_{375}	—	August 22, 2001	Kitt Peak	Spacewatch	·	900 m	MPC · JPL
625395	2005 UV_{387}	—	October 22, 2005	Kitt Peak	Spacewatch	NYS	1.0 km	MPC · JPL
625396	2005 UN_{391}	—	October 1, 2005	Mount Lemmon	Mount Lemmon Survey	MRX	650 m	MPC · JPL
625397	2005 UV_{402}	—	March 26, 2003	Kitt Peak	Spacewatch	·	1.9 km	MPC · JPL
625398	2005 UC_{403}	—	October 28, 2005	Kitt Peak	Spacewatch	·	1.5 km	MPC · JPL
625399	2005 UL_{409}	—	October 1, 2005	Kitt Peak	Spacewatch	·	730 m	MPC · JPL
625400	2005 UK_{415}	—	October 25, 2005	Kitt Peak	Spacewatch	MAS	460 m	MPC · JPL

== 625401–625500 ==
back to top

Designation			Discovery			Properties		Ref
Permanent	Provisional	Named after	Date	Site	Discoverer(s)	Category	Diam.	Ref
625401	2005 UU_{415}	—	October 25, 2005	Kitt Peak	Spacewatch	HOF	2.1 km	MPC · JPL
625402	2005 UY_{422}	—	October 27, 2005	Mount Lemmon	Mount Lemmon Survey	AGN	1.2 km	MPC · JPL
625403	2005 UT_{442}	—	October 1, 2005	Catalina	CSS	·	1.3 km	MPC · JPL
625404	2005 UL_{451}	—	October 28, 2005	Kitt Peak	Spacewatch	·	1.2 km	MPC · JPL
625405	2005 UF_{453}	—	October 25, 2005	Kitt Peak	Spacewatch	·	980 m	MPC · JPL
625406	2005 UZ_{468}	—	October 30, 2005	Kitt Peak	Spacewatch	V	470 m	MPC · JPL
625407	2005 UB_{471}	—	October 30, 2005	Kitt Peak	Spacewatch	·	1.7 km	MPC · JPL
625408	2005 UF_{478}	—	October 27, 2005	Kitt Peak	Spacewatch	·	510 m	MPC · JPL
625409	2005 UZ_{480}	—	August 31, 2005	Palomar	NEAT	·	1.7 km	MPC · JPL
625410	2005 UY_{481}	—	October 1, 2005	Catalina	CSS	·	1.4 km	MPC · JPL
625411	2005 UB_{510}	—	October 24, 2005	Kitt Peak	Spacewatch	·	1.4 km	MPC · JPL
625412	2005 UE_{510}	—	October 24, 2005	Kitt Peak	Spacewatch	·	1.4 km	MPC · JPL
625413	2005 UL_{510}	—	October 25, 2005	Kitt Peak	Spacewatch	ERI	1.1 km	MPC · JPL
625414	2005 UT_{516}	—	October 7, 2005	Mount Lemmon	Mount Lemmon Survey	·	1.3 km	MPC · JPL
625415	2005 UU_{532}	—	October 26, 2005	Kitt Peak	Spacewatch	·	1.4 km	MPC · JPL
625416	2005 UB_{539}	—	December 23, 2016	Haleakala	Pan-STARRS 1	·	740 m	MPC · JPL
625417	2005 UE_{539}	—	September 6, 2008	Mount Lemmon	Mount Lemmon Survey	·	580 m	MPC · JPL
625418	2005 UM_{540}	—	October 31, 2005	Mount Lemmon	Mount Lemmon Survey	·	750 m	MPC · JPL
625419	2005 UN_{543}	—	February 20, 2014	Mount Lemmon	Mount Lemmon Survey	·	1.0 km	MPC · JPL
625420	2005 UM_{545}	—	October 31, 2005	Kitt Peak	Spacewatch	MAS	500 m	MPC · JPL
625421	2005 UA_{552}	—	October 24, 2005	Mauna Kea	A. Boattini	MAS	600 m	MPC · JPL
625422	2005 VB_{9}	—	November 1, 2005	Kitt Peak	Spacewatch	·	1.3 km	MPC · JPL
625423	2005 VU_{11}	—	February 12, 2000	Apache Point	SDSS Collaboration	V	600 m	MPC · JPL
625424	2005 VG_{13}	—	November 3, 2005	Mount Lemmon	Mount Lemmon Survey	·	1.9 km	MPC · JPL
625425	2005 VO_{20}	—	October 25, 2005	Kitt Peak	Spacewatch	·	810 m	MPC · JPL
625426	2005 VQ_{21}	—	November 1, 2005	Kitt Peak	Spacewatch	·	1.3 km	MPC · JPL
625427	2005 VB_{27}	—	October 28, 2005	Kitt Peak	Spacewatch	GEF	930 m	MPC · JPL
625428	2005 VM_{29}	—	October 25, 2005	Kitt Peak	Spacewatch	KOR	1.0 km	MPC · JPL
625429	2005 VR_{36}	—	September 30, 2005	Mount Lemmon	Mount Lemmon Survey	EOS	1.7 km	MPC · JPL
625430	2005 VJ_{47}	—	November 5, 2005	Kitt Peak	Spacewatch	·	850 m	MPC · JPL
625431	2005 VH_{48}	—	November 5, 2005	Mount Lemmon	Mount Lemmon Survey	·	1.3 km	MPC · JPL
625432	2005 VA_{63}	—	September 25, 2005	Kitt Peak	Spacewatch	·	860 m	MPC · JPL
625433	2005 VZ_{63}	—	November 3, 2005	Kitt Peak	Spacewatch	·	1.0 km	MPC · JPL
625434	2005 VW_{69}	—	November 5, 2005	Mount Lemmon	Mount Lemmon Survey	AGN	870 m	MPC · JPL
625435	2005 VQ_{73}	—	November 6, 2005	Kitt Peak	Spacewatch	·	1.0 km	MPC · JPL
625436	2005 VB_{79}	—	October 28, 2005	Kitt Peak	Spacewatch	·	1.4 km	MPC · JPL
625437	2005 VZ_{87}	—	October 29, 2005	Kitt Peak	Spacewatch	·	1.4 km	MPC · JPL
625438	2005 VO_{91}	—	November 6, 2005	Kitt Peak	Spacewatch	·	1.6 km	MPC · JPL
625439	2005 VE_{92}	—	October 28, 2005	Mount Lemmon	Mount Lemmon Survey	·	790 m	MPC · JPL
625440	2005 VT_{102}	—	August 31, 2005	Palomar	NEAT	(2076)	840 m	MPC · JPL
625441	2005 VJ_{116}	—	November 11, 2005	Kitt Peak	Spacewatch	·	1.7 km	MPC · JPL
625442	2005 VN_{117}	—	November 11, 2005	Kitt Peak	Spacewatch	H	270 m	MPC · JPL
625443	2005 VL_{126}	—	October 1, 2005	Mount Lemmon	Mount Lemmon Survey	·	1.2 km	MPC · JPL
625444	2005 VO_{128}	—	October 30, 2005	Apache Point	SDSS Collaboration	MAS	450 m	MPC · JPL
625445	2005 VB_{129}	—	October 30, 2005	Apache Point	SDSS Collaboration	·	1.4 km	MPC · JPL
625446	2005 VP_{139}	—	November 10, 2009	Kitt Peak	Spacewatch	V	600 m	MPC · JPL
625447	2005 VS_{139}	—	April 18, 2007	Mount Lemmon	Mount Lemmon Survey	·	1.0 km	MPC · JPL
625448	2005 VT_{140}	—	June 22, 2015	Haleakala	Pan-STARRS 1	·	890 m	MPC · JPL
625449	2005 VY_{141}	—	October 31, 2010	Kitt Peak	Spacewatch	·	1.8 km	MPC · JPL
625450	2005 VZ_{141}	—	March 22, 2014	Mount Lemmon	Mount Lemmon Survey	·	820 m	MPC · JPL
625451	2005 VR_{142}	—	November 5, 2005	Kitt Peak	Spacewatch	·	830 m	MPC · JPL
625452	2005 VW_{142}	—	November 12, 2005	Kitt Peak	Spacewatch	·	1.5 km	MPC · JPL
625453	2005 VU_{143}	—	April 30, 2011	Mount Lemmon	Mount Lemmon Survey	·	1.1 km	MPC · JPL
625454	2005 VB_{144}	—	August 22, 2014	Haleakala	Pan-STARRS 1	KOR	1 km	MPC · JPL
625455	2005 VJ_{144}	—	December 3, 2010	Mount Lemmon	Mount Lemmon Survey	·	1.7 km	MPC · JPL
625456	2005 VU_{144}	—	September 19, 2014	Haleakala	Pan-STARRS 1	AGN	930 m	MPC · JPL
625457	2005 VH_{148}	—	May 21, 2015	Haleakala	Pan-STARRS 1	·	900 m	MPC · JPL
625458	2005 VU_{148}	—	February 28, 2012	Haleakala	Pan-STARRS 1	HOF	2.1 km	MPC · JPL
625459	2005 VY_{148}	—	April 3, 2011	Haleakala	Pan-STARRS 1	·	930 m	MPC · JPL
625460	2005 VE_{149}	—	December 16, 2009	Kitt Peak	Spacewatch	NYS	790 m	MPC · JPL
625461	2005 VK_{149}	—	November 1, 2005	Kitt Peak	Spacewatch	·	730 m	MPC · JPL
625462	2005 VZ_{151}	—	November 6, 2005	Mount Lemmon	Mount Lemmon Survey	·	870 m	MPC · JPL
625463	2005 WQ_{16}	—	November 10, 2005	Mount Lemmon	Mount Lemmon Survey	·	1.5 km	MPC · JPL
625464	2005 WN_{24}	—	November 21, 2005	Kitt Peak	Spacewatch	·	1.2 km	MPC · JPL
625465	2005 WE_{27}	—	October 30, 2005	Mount Lemmon	Mount Lemmon Survey	DOR	1.4 km	MPC · JPL
625466	2005 WO_{29}	—	November 21, 2005	Kitt Peak	Spacewatch	·	1.9 km	MPC · JPL
625467	2005 WB_{32}	—	November 21, 2005	Kitt Peak	Spacewatch	EOS	1.6 km	MPC · JPL
625468	2005 WB_{37}	—	November 22, 2005	Kitt Peak	Spacewatch	V	690 m	MPC · JPL
625469	2005 WZ_{39}	—	November 1, 2005	Mount Lemmon	Mount Lemmon Survey	·	1.5 km	MPC · JPL
625470	2005 WM_{41}	—	October 25, 2005	Mount Lemmon	Mount Lemmon Survey	MAS	420 m	MPC · JPL
625471	2005 WA_{61}	—	October 30, 2005	Mount Lemmon	Mount Lemmon Survey	·	800 m	MPC · JPL
625472	2005 WN_{77}	—	November 25, 2005	Kitt Peak	Spacewatch	·	730 m	MPC · JPL
625473	2005 WA_{94}	—	November 26, 2005	Kitt Peak	Spacewatch	·	1.6 km	MPC · JPL
625474	2005 WW_{106}	—	November 25, 2005	Catalina	CSS	·	890 m	MPC · JPL
625475	2005 WV_{122}	—	September 13, 2005	Catalina	CSS	JUN	910 m	MPC · JPL
625476	2005 WM_{126}	—	October 28, 2005	Mount Lemmon	Mount Lemmon Survey	·	1.4 km	MPC · JPL
625477	2005 WO_{131}	—	November 25, 2005	Mount Lemmon	Mount Lemmon Survey	KOR	1.0 km	MPC · JPL
625478	2005 WF_{132}	—	November 25, 2005	Mount Lemmon	Mount Lemmon Survey	·	1.6 km	MPC · JPL
625479	2005 WK_{141}	—	November 28, 2005	Mount Lemmon	Mount Lemmon Survey	·	1.2 km	MPC · JPL
625480	2005 WB_{143}	—	October 22, 2005	Kitt Peak	Spacewatch	HOF	2.2 km	MPC · JPL
625481	2005 WQ_{144}	—	November 25, 2005	Kitt Peak	Spacewatch	AGN	920 m	MPC · JPL
625482	2005 WL_{147}	—	November 25, 2005	Catalina	CSS	·	1.3 km	MPC · JPL
625483	2005 WQ_{148}	—	November 26, 2005	Mount Lemmon	Mount Lemmon Survey	·	800 m	MPC · JPL
625484	2005 WX_{154}	—	November 29, 2005	Kitt Peak	Spacewatch	·	880 m	MPC · JPL
625485	2005 WT_{165}	—	October 31, 2005	Mount Lemmon	Mount Lemmon Survey	·	1.3 km	MPC · JPL
625486	2005 WJ_{177}	—	November 30, 2005	Kitt Peak	Spacewatch	·	1.1 km	MPC · JPL
625487	2005 WQ_{196}	—	October 29, 2005	Mount Lemmon	Mount Lemmon Survey	·	2.0 km	MPC · JPL
625488	2005 WO_{201}	—	November 29, 2005	Kitt Peak	Spacewatch	·	740 m	MPC · JPL
625489	2005 WD_{205}	—	October 28, 2005	Mount Lemmon	Mount Lemmon Survey	KOR	1.1 km	MPC · JPL
625490	2005 WN_{212}	—	November 26, 2005	Mount Lemmon	Mount Lemmon Survey	H	270 m	MPC · JPL
625491	2005 WQ_{212}	—	November 30, 2005	Mount Lemmon	Mount Lemmon Survey	·	910 m	MPC · JPL
625492	2005 WG_{214}	—	December 2, 2010	Mount Lemmon	Mount Lemmon Survey	·	2.1 km	MPC · JPL
625493	2005 WL_{214}	—	November 26, 2005	Mount Lemmon	Mount Lemmon Survey	KOR	1.1 km	MPC · JPL
625494	2005 WS_{215}	—	February 25, 2007	Kitt Peak	Spacewatch	·	910 m	MPC · JPL
625495	2005 WW_{216}	—	November 30, 2005	Mount Lemmon	Mount Lemmon Survey	·	1.7 km	MPC · JPL
625496	2005 WD_{217}	—	November 25, 2005	Mount Lemmon	Mount Lemmon Survey	·	1.2 km	MPC · JPL
625497	2005 XO_{1}	—	November 21, 2005	Kitt Peak	Spacewatch	NYS	910 m	MPC · JPL
625498	2005 XT_{7}	—	October 25, 2005	Mount Lemmon	Mount Lemmon Survey	·	1.5 km	MPC · JPL
625499	2005 XO_{14}	—	December 1, 2005	Kitt Peak	Spacewatch	·	640 m	MPC · JPL
625500	2005 XT_{26}	—	December 4, 2005	Kitt Peak	Spacewatch	·	600 m	MPC · JPL

== 625501–625600 ==
back to top

Designation			Discovery			Properties		Ref
Permanent	Provisional	Named after	Date	Site	Discoverer(s)	Category	Diam.	Ref
625501	2005 XD_{27}	—	December 4, 2005	Kitt Peak	Spacewatch	·	1.7 km	MPC · JPL
625502	2005 XG_{30}	—	October 26, 2005	Kitt Peak	Spacewatch	·	810 m	MPC · JPL
625503	2005 XJ_{31}	—	December 1, 2005	Kitt Peak	Spacewatch	·	1.6 km	MPC · JPL
625504	2005 XD_{37}	—	December 4, 2005	Kitt Peak	Spacewatch	NYS	950 m	MPC · JPL
625505	2005 XE_{37}	—	December 4, 2005	Kitt Peak	Spacewatch	·	2.0 km	MPC · JPL
625506	2005 XN_{42}	—	November 5, 2005	Kitt Peak	Spacewatch	·	970 m	MPC · JPL
625507	2005 XX_{68}	—	December 6, 2005	Kitt Peak	Spacewatch	AGN	920 m	MPC · JPL
625508	2005 XV_{80}	—	December 5, 2005	Mount Lemmon	Mount Lemmon Survey	·	710 m	MPC · JPL
625509	2005 XN_{97}	—	March 27, 2003	Kitt Peak	Spacewatch	·	1.7 km	MPC · JPL
625510	2005 XZ_{102}	—	December 1, 2005	Kitt Peak	Wasserman, L. H., Millis, R. L.	·	1.2 km	MPC · JPL
625511	2005 XY_{103}	—	October 6, 2004	Kitt Peak	Spacewatch	·	2.4 km	MPC · JPL
625512	2005 XP_{106}	—	December 1, 2005	Kitt Peak	Wasserman, L. H., Millis, R. L.	KOR	1.3 km	MPC · JPL
625513	2005 XE_{115}	—	November 1, 2010	Kitt Peak	Spacewatch	·	1.7 km	MPC · JPL
625514	2005 XU_{124}	—	July 30, 2008	Mount Lemmon	Mount Lemmon Survey	V	540 m	MPC · JPL
625515	2005 XC_{125}	—	August 27, 2009	Kitt Peak	Spacewatch	·	1.7 km	MPC · JPL
625516	2005 XS_{130}	—	October 14, 2001	Apache Point	SDSS Collaboration	NYS	700 m	MPC · JPL
625517	2005 XW_{130}	—	December 6, 2005	Kitt Peak	Spacewatch	·	780 m	MPC · JPL
625518	2005 XW_{132}	—	December 5, 2005	Mount Lemmon	Mount Lemmon Survey	MAS	580 m	MPC · JPL
625519	2005 XZ_{132}	—	December 7, 2005	Kitt Peak	Spacewatch	·	940 m	MPC · JPL
625520	2005 XZ_{133}	—	October 25, 2000	Kitt Peak	Spacewatch	·	1.5 km	MPC · JPL
625521	2005 XJ_{134}	—	December 8, 2005	Kitt Peak	Spacewatch	·	730 m	MPC · JPL
625522	2005 YC_{4}	—	December 21, 2005	Catalina	CSS	·	1.3 km	MPC · JPL
625523	2005 YY_{8}	—	December 20, 2005	Junk Bond	D. Healy	NYS	930 m	MPC · JPL
625524	2005 YM_{16}	—	December 22, 2005	Kitt Peak	Spacewatch	·	1.8 km	MPC · JPL
625525	2005 YF_{22}	—	December 24, 2005	Kitt Peak	Spacewatch	KOR	1.1 km	MPC · JPL
625526	2005 YS_{63}	—	December 24, 2005	Kitt Peak	Spacewatch	MAS	470 m	MPC · JPL
625527	2005 YP_{77}	—	December 24, 2005	Kitt Peak	Spacewatch	·	890 m	MPC · JPL
625528	2005 YC_{78}	—	December 24, 2005	Kitt Peak	Spacewatch	NYS	900 m	MPC · JPL
625529	2005 YV_{78}	—	August 3, 2004	Siding Spring	SSS	MAS	760 m	MPC · JPL
625530	2005 YS_{85}	—	December 25, 2005	Mount Lemmon	Mount Lemmon Survey	·	1.3 km	MPC · JPL
625531	2005 YX_{99}	—	December 28, 2005	Kitt Peak	Spacewatch	HOF	1.8 km	MPC · JPL
625532	2005 YB_{116}	—	December 25, 2005	Kitt Peak	Spacewatch	·	700 m	MPC · JPL
625533	2005 YO_{117}	—	December 25, 2005	Kitt Peak	Spacewatch	·	1.1 km	MPC · JPL
625534	2005 YT_{143}	—	December 28, 2005	Mount Lemmon	Mount Lemmon Survey	H	490 m	MPC · JPL
625535	2005 YC_{146}	—	December 29, 2005	Mount Lemmon	Mount Lemmon Survey	·	840 m	MPC · JPL
625536	2005 YT_{148}	—	December 25, 2005	Kitt Peak	Spacewatch	·	800 m	MPC · JPL
625537	2005 YO_{149}	—	December 25, 2005	Kitt Peak	Spacewatch	·	1.3 km	MPC · JPL
625538	2005 YQ_{194}	—	December 27, 2005	Kitt Peak	Spacewatch	·	970 m	MPC · JPL
625539	2005 YN_{221}	—	December 21, 2005	Kitt Peak	Spacewatch	·	1.5 km	MPC · JPL
625540	2005 YK_{233}	—	December 28, 2005	Mount Lemmon	Mount Lemmon Survey	·	1.3 km	MPC · JPL
625541	2005 YB_{235}	—	December 28, 2005	Mount Lemmon	Mount Lemmon Survey	KOR	990 m	MPC · JPL
625542	2005 YE_{247}	—	December 30, 2005	Mount Lemmon	Mount Lemmon Survey	·	1.5 km	MPC · JPL
625543	2005 YX_{247}	—	December 31, 2005	Kitt Peak	Spacewatch	·	820 m	MPC · JPL
625544	2005 YF_{251}	—	December 28, 2005	Kitt Peak	Spacewatch	AEO	750 m	MPC · JPL
625545	2005 YD_{254}	—	December 29, 2005	Kitt Peak	Spacewatch	DOR	1.6 km	MPC · JPL
625546	2005 YQ_{254}	—	December 30, 2005	Kitt Peak	Spacewatch	·	820 m	MPC · JPL
625547	2005 YY_{259}	—	August 23, 2004	Kitt Peak	Spacewatch	·	600 m	MPC · JPL
625548	2005 YG_{262}	—	December 25, 2005	Mount Lemmon	Mount Lemmon Survey	·	850 m	MPC · JPL
625549	2005 YR_{264}	—	December 25, 2005	Kitt Peak	Spacewatch	·	1.6 km	MPC · JPL
625550	2005 YA_{267}	—	December 22, 2005	Kitt Peak	Spacewatch	·	1.2 km	MPC · JPL
625551	2005 YR_{268}	—	December 25, 2005	Kitt Peak	Spacewatch	TIN	850 m	MPC · JPL
625552	2005 YW_{286}	—	December 31, 2005	Kitt Peak	Spacewatch	·	1.0 km	MPC · JPL
625553	2005 YT_{290}	—	December 8, 2005	Kitt Peak	Spacewatch	·	780 m	MPC · JPL
625554	2005 YV_{294}	—	August 13, 2012	Kitt Peak	Spacewatch	·	880 m	MPC · JPL
625555	2005 YE_{296}	—	December 25, 2005	Kitt Peak	Spacewatch	·	810 m	MPC · JPL
625556	2005 YB_{297}	—	February 22, 2011	Kitt Peak	Spacewatch	GEF	920 m	MPC · JPL
625557	2005 YG_{297}	—	September 24, 2012	Kitt Peak	Spacewatch	·	1.1 km	MPC · JPL
625558	2006 AN_{13}	—	December 28, 2005	Kitt Peak	Spacewatch	·	790 m	MPC · JPL
625559	2006 AY_{36}	—	January 4, 2006	Kitt Peak	Spacewatch	·	1.2 km	MPC · JPL
625560	2006 AB_{43}	—	January 6, 2006	Kitt Peak	Spacewatch	·	1.1 km	MPC · JPL
625561	2006 AT_{49}	—	January 5, 2006	Kitt Peak	Spacewatch	·	1.1 km	MPC · JPL
625562	2006 AG_{50}	—	January 4, 2006	Mount Lemmon	Mount Lemmon Survey	·	1.4 km	MPC · JPL
625563	2006 AT_{70}	—	December 25, 2005	Mount Lemmon	Mount Lemmon Survey	·	1.4 km	MPC · JPL
625564	2006 AD_{78}	—	January 8, 2006	Kitt Peak	Spacewatch	·	1.4 km	MPC · JPL
625565	2006 AJ_{91}	—	January 7, 2006	Kitt Peak	Spacewatch	·	1.5 km	MPC · JPL
625566	2006 AR_{94}	—	January 8, 2006	Kitt Peak	Spacewatch	·	920 m	MPC · JPL
625567	2006 AF_{108}	—	January 7, 2006	Mount Lemmon	Mount Lemmon Survey	KOR	1.1 km	MPC · JPL
625568	2006 AH_{108}	—	January 5, 2006	Mount Lemmon	Mount Lemmon Survey	NYS	860 m	MPC · JPL
625569	2006 AO_{109}	—	January 7, 2006	Kitt Peak	Spacewatch	·	1.5 km	MPC · JPL
625570	2006 AB_{110}	—	January 4, 2006	Kitt Peak	Spacewatch	·	770 m	MPC · JPL
625571	2006 AT_{110}	—	February 28, 2014	Haleakala	Pan-STARRS 1	MAS	720 m	MPC · JPL
625572	2006 AZ_{111}	—	January 7, 2006	Mount Lemmon	Mount Lemmon Survey	·	1.2 km	MPC · JPL
625573	2006 AE_{112}	—	July 27, 2011	Haleakala	Pan-STARRS 1	V	470 m	MPC · JPL
625574	2006 AC_{113}	—	October 20, 2012	Haleakala	Pan-STARRS 1	·	890 m	MPC · JPL
625575	2006 AB_{114}	—	July 15, 2013	Haleakala	Pan-STARRS 1	AGN	820 m	MPC · JPL
625576	2006 BW_{1}	—	January 20, 2006	Kitt Peak	Spacewatch	·	890 m	MPC · JPL
625577	2006 BG_{4}	—	January 21, 2006	Kitt Peak	Spacewatch	·	720 m	MPC · JPL
625578	2006 BS_{5}	—	January 22, 2006	Kitt Peak	Spacewatch	·	830 m	MPC · JPL
625579	2006 BT_{11}	—	January 21, 2006	Kitt Peak	Spacewatch	·	1.0 km	MPC · JPL
625580	2006 BC_{36}	—	January 23, 2006	Kitt Peak	Spacewatch	·	750 m	MPC · JPL
625581	2006 BR_{37}	—	January 7, 2006	Mount Lemmon	Mount Lemmon Survey	·	1.6 km	MPC · JPL
625582	2006 BO_{46}	—	January 23, 2006	Mount Lemmon	Mount Lemmon Survey	·	1.4 km	MPC · JPL
625583	2006 BC_{68}	—	January 23, 2006	Kitt Peak	Spacewatch	·	880 m	MPC · JPL
625584	2006 BV_{91}	—	January 26, 2006	Kitt Peak	Spacewatch	·	770 m	MPC · JPL
625585	2006 BS_{107}	—	December 25, 2005	Mount Lemmon	Mount Lemmon Survey	·	900 m	MPC · JPL
625586	2006 BA_{109}	—	January 25, 2006	Kitt Peak	Spacewatch	·	1.4 km	MPC · JPL
625587	2006 BE_{114}	—	January 25, 2006	Kitt Peak	Spacewatch	·	560 m	MPC · JPL
625588	2006 BX_{115}	—	January 26, 2006	Kitt Peak	Spacewatch	L5	7.8 km	MPC · JPL
625589	2006 BM_{141}	—	January 25, 2006	Kitt Peak	Spacewatch	NYS	830 m	MPC · JPL
625590	2006 BU_{169}	—	January 26, 2006	Mount Lemmon	Mount Lemmon Survey	·	780 m	MPC · JPL
625591	2006 BA_{198}	—	January 21, 2006	Kitt Peak	Spacewatch	PHO	930 m	MPC · JPL
625592	2006 BY_{202}	—	January 31, 2006	Kitt Peak	Spacewatch	EOS	1.4 km	MPC · JPL
625593	2006 BJ_{209}	—	January 31, 2006	Mount Lemmon	Mount Lemmon Survey	KOR	960 m	MPC · JPL
625594	2006 BB_{230}	—	January 31, 2006	Kitt Peak	Spacewatch	·	2.0 km	MPC · JPL
625595	2006 BD_{231}	—	January 23, 2006	Kitt Peak	Spacewatch	·	1.1 km	MPC · JPL
625596	2006 BH_{237}	—	January 31, 2006	Kitt Peak	Spacewatch	KOR	980 m	MPC · JPL
625597	2006 BB_{241}	—	January 31, 2006	Kitt Peak	Spacewatch	KOR	1.2 km	MPC · JPL
625598	2006 BX_{254}	—	January 31, 2006	Kitt Peak	Spacewatch	·	690 m	MPC · JPL
625599	2006 BM_{277}	—	January 23, 2006	Mount Lemmon	Mount Lemmon Survey	·	1.4 km	MPC · JPL
625600	2006 BU_{290}	—	February 26, 2014	Haleakala	Pan-STARRS 1	·	1.0 km	MPC · JPL

== 625601–625700 ==
back to top

Designation			Discovery			Properties		Ref
Permanent	Provisional	Named after	Date	Site	Discoverer(s)	Category	Diam.	Ref
625601	2006 BH_{293}	—	October 8, 2012	Kitt Peak	Spacewatch	CLA	1.4 km	MPC · JPL
625602	2006 BX_{296}	—	January 30, 2006	Kitt Peak	Spacewatch	·	1.1 km	MPC · JPL
625603	2006 BL_{300}	—	January 23, 2006	Kitt Peak	Spacewatch	·	1.1 km	MPC · JPL
625604	2006 CH_{11}	—	February 1, 2006	Kitt Peak	Spacewatch	H	500 m	MPC · JPL
625605	2006 CD_{20}	—	February 1, 2006	Mount Lemmon	Mount Lemmon Survey	NYS	660 m	MPC · JPL
625606	2006 CS_{25}	—	February 2, 2006	Kitt Peak	Spacewatch	·	2.4 km	MPC · JPL
625607	2006 CM_{51}	—	February 4, 2006	Kitt Peak	Spacewatch	·	980 m	MPC · JPL
625608	2006 CH_{82}	—	October 26, 2011	Haleakala	Pan-STARRS 1	·	460 m	MPC · JPL
625609	2006 CG_{83}	—	February 4, 2006	Kitt Peak	Spacewatch	·	1.5 km	MPC · JPL
625610	2006 CY_{83}	—	February 21, 2014	Mount Lemmon	Mount Lemmon Survey	·	1.3 km	MPC · JPL
625611	2006 CD_{84}	—	February 7, 2011	Mount Lemmon	Mount Lemmon Survey	·	1.1 km	MPC · JPL
625612	2006 CZ_{84}	—	July 12, 2015	Haleakala	Pan-STARRS 1	V	500 m	MPC · JPL
625613	2006 CK_{86}	—	September 17, 2012	Kitt Peak	Spacewatch	·	940 m	MPC · JPL
625614	2006 CY_{86}	—	November 24, 2014	Mount Lemmon	Mount Lemmon Survey	·	620 m	MPC · JPL
625615	2006 CW_{87}	—	July 28, 2011	Haleakala	Pan-STARRS 1	V	520 m	MPC · JPL
625616	2006 CU_{88}	—	February 1, 2006	Kitt Peak	Spacewatch	·	1.4 km	MPC · JPL
625617	2006 CX_{89}	—	February 1, 2006	Mount Lemmon	Mount Lemmon Survey	·	970 m	MPC · JPL
625618	2006 DX_{4}	—	February 20, 2006	Kitt Peak	Spacewatch	MAS	540 m	MPC · JPL
625619	2006 DH_{19}	—	February 20, 2006	Kitt Peak	Spacewatch	·	990 m	MPC · JPL
625620	2006 DV_{44}	—	September 30, 2005	Mauna Kea	A. Boattini	NYS	730 m	MPC · JPL
625621	2006 DU_{47}	—	February 21, 2006	Mount Lemmon	Mount Lemmon Survey	H	330 m	MPC · JPL
625622	2006 DN_{63}	—	February 27, 2006	Catalina	CSS	H	450 m	MPC · JPL
625623	2006 DN_{70}	—	October 2, 2003	Kitt Peak	Spacewatch	·	2.1 km	MPC · JPL
625624	2006 DU_{91}	—	February 24, 2006	Mount Lemmon	Mount Lemmon Survey	·	1.4 km	MPC · JPL
625625	2006 DM_{98}	—	October 24, 2003	Apache Point	SDSS Collaboration	3:2	3.8 km	MPC · JPL
625626	2006 DN_{103}	—	February 25, 2006	Mount Lemmon	Mount Lemmon Survey	KOR	1.4 km	MPC · JPL
625627	2006 DQ_{111}	—	January 31, 2006	Kitt Peak	Spacewatch	NYS	800 m	MPC · JPL
625628	2006 DE_{162}	—	February 27, 2006	Mount Lemmon	Mount Lemmon Survey	EOS	1.5 km	MPC · JPL
625629	2006 DL_{177}	—	February 27, 2006	Mount Lemmon	Mount Lemmon Survey	·	2.7 km	MPC · JPL
625630	2006 DP_{180}	—	February 27, 2006	Kitt Peak	Spacewatch	·	1.2 km	MPC · JPL
625631	2006 DE_{224}	—	October 22, 2009	Mount Lemmon	Mount Lemmon Survey	·	1.3 km	MPC · JPL
625632	2006 DQ_{225}	—	February 27, 2006	Mount Lemmon	Mount Lemmon Survey	·	630 m	MPC · JPL
625633	2006 DA_{226}	—	February 24, 2006	Kitt Peak	Spacewatch	NYS	780 m	MPC · JPL
625634	2006 EW_{3}	—	January 31, 2006	Kitt Peak	Spacewatch	·	1.6 km	MPC · JPL
625635	2006 ES_{24}	—	March 3, 2006	Kitt Peak	Spacewatch	·	1.2 km	MPC · JPL
625636	2006 EU_{40}	—	October 19, 2001	Palomar	NEAT	·	940 m	MPC · JPL
625637	2006 EG_{50}	—	March 4, 2006	Mount Lemmon	Mount Lemmon Survey	·	760 m	MPC · JPL
625638	2006 EC_{71}	—	January 30, 2006	Kitt Peak	Spacewatch	·	1.2 km	MPC · JPL
625639	2006 EC_{77}	—	September 11, 2007	Mount Lemmon	Mount Lemmon Survey	·	580 m	MPC · JPL
625640	2006 EX_{80}	—	March 4, 2016	Haleakala	Pan-STARRS 1	615	980 m	MPC · JPL
625641	2006 EY_{81}	—	March 4, 2006	Kitt Peak	Spacewatch	·	1.2 km	MPC · JPL
625642	2006 FE_{50}	—	March 23, 2006	Kitt Peak	Spacewatch	H	460 m	MPC · JPL
625643	2006 FP_{57}	—	March 25, 2006	Kitt Peak	Spacewatch	·	1.5 km	MPC · JPL
625644	2006 FZ_{57}	—	March 25, 2006	Mount Lemmon	Mount Lemmon Survey	EUN	710 m	MPC · JPL
625645	2006 FU_{59}	—	August 10, 2010	Kitt Peak	Spacewatch	·	550 m	MPC · JPL
625646	2006 GX_{2}	—	April 9, 2006	Anderson Mesa	LONEOS	APO	260 m	MPC · JPL
625647	2006 GS_{31}	—	April 3, 2006	La Silla	La Silla	EOS	1.9 km	MPC · JPL
625648	2006 GE_{43}	—	February 21, 2006	Catalina	CSS	·	1.3 km	MPC · JPL
625649	2006 GP_{55}	—	February 25, 2006	Mount Lemmon	Mount Lemmon Survey	·	1.1 km	MPC · JPL
625650	2006 HS_{43}	—	April 24, 2006	Mount Lemmon	Mount Lemmon Survey	·	560 m	MPC · JPL
625651	2006 HL_{48}	—	April 24, 2006	Kitt Peak	Spacewatch	·	550 m	MPC · JPL
625652	2006 HT_{54}	—	April 21, 2006	Catalina	CSS	·	1.5 km	MPC · JPL
625653	2006 HN_{62}	—	April 24, 2006	Kitt Peak	Spacewatch	·	2.0 km	MPC · JPL
625654	2006 HB_{65}	—	April 24, 2006	Kitt Peak	Spacewatch	NYS	960 m	MPC · JPL
625655	2006 HX_{68}	—	April 24, 2006	Mount Lemmon	Mount Lemmon Survey	·	2.1 km	MPC · JPL
625656	2006 HY_{79}	—	April 26, 2006	Kitt Peak	Spacewatch	·	1.5 km	MPC · JPL
625657	2006 HW_{92}	—	April 25, 2006	Kitt Peak	Spacewatch	·	590 m	MPC · JPL
625658	2006 HJ_{98}	—	April 30, 2006	Kitt Peak	Spacewatch	·	480 m	MPC · JPL
625659	2006 HW_{129}	—	August 26, 2003	Cerro Tololo	Deep Ecliptic Survey	·	1.6 km	MPC · JPL
625660	2006 HS_{133}	—	March 6, 2006	Kitt Peak	Spacewatch	L5	6.7 km	MPC · JPL
625661	2006 HD_{136}	—	April 26, 2006	Cerro Tololo	Deep Ecliptic Survey	·	1.1 km	MPC · JPL
625662	2006 HZ_{140}	—	April 27, 2006	Cerro Tololo	Deep Ecliptic Survey	THM	1.8 km	MPC · JPL
625663	2006 HG_{142}	—	March 25, 2001	Kitt Peak	Deep Ecliptic Survey	·	1.5 km	MPC · JPL
625664	2006 HB_{153}	—	April 24, 2006	Mount Lemmon	Mount Lemmon Survey	·	450 m	MPC · JPL
625665	2006 HY_{156}	—	May 6, 2006	Kitt Peak	Spacewatch	·	820 m	MPC · JPL
625666	2006 HU_{158}	—	March 19, 2013	Haleakala	Pan-STARRS 1	·	490 m	MPC · JPL
625667	2006 HW_{158}	—	September 9, 2007	Kitt Peak	Spacewatch	·	350 m	MPC · JPL
625668	2006 HP_{159}	—	September 11, 2010	Mount Lemmon	Mount Lemmon Survey	·	560 m	MPC · JPL
625669	2006 HU_{159}	—	April 30, 2006	Kitt Peak	Spacewatch	·	570 m	MPC · JPL
625670	2006 JZ_{2}	—	May 2, 2006	Mount Lemmon	Mount Lemmon Survey	·	1.3 km	MPC · JPL
625671	2006 JZ_{28}	—	April 13, 2002	Palomar	NEAT	·	1.2 km	MPC · JPL
625672	2006 JZ_{29}	—	April 21, 2006	Kitt Peak	Spacewatch	EOS	1.9 km	MPC · JPL
625673	2006 JR_{32}	—	May 3, 2006	Kitt Peak	Spacewatch	·	1.3 km	MPC · JPL
625674	2006 JN_{33}	—	September 8, 1997	Caussols	ODAS	·	730 m	MPC · JPL
625675	2006 JB_{37}	—	March 26, 2006	Kitt Peak	Spacewatch	·	1.1 km	MPC · JPL
625676	2006 JN_{51}	—	May 2, 2006	Kitt Peak	Spacewatch	·	1.0 km	MPC · JPL
625677	2006 JN_{68}	—	May 1, 2006	Mauna Kea	P. A. Wiegert	·	980 m	MPC · JPL
625678	2006 JW_{72}	—	May 1, 2006	Mauna Kea	P. A. Wiegert	·	860 m	MPC · JPL
625679	2006 JE_{78}	—	May 1, 2006	Mauna Kea	P. A. Wiegert	·	1.0 km	MPC · JPL
625680	2006 JO_{81}	—	May 4, 2006	Kitt Peak	Spacewatch	·	720 m	MPC · JPL
625681	2006 JW_{84}	—	September 10, 2013	Haleakala	Pan-STARRS 1	·	2.3 km	MPC · JPL
625682	2006 JA_{86}	—	May 5, 2006	Mount Lemmon	Mount Lemmon Survey	·	1.7 km	MPC · JPL
625683	2006 JW_{89}	—	May 9, 2006	Mount Lemmon	Mount Lemmon Survey	·	540 m	MPC · JPL
625684	2006 KN_{8}	—	April 25, 2006	Mount Lemmon	Mount Lemmon Survey	·	530 m	MPC · JPL
625685	2006 KP_{16}	—	May 21, 2006	Kitt Peak	Spacewatch	·	460 m	MPC · JPL
625686	2006 KZ_{26}	—	May 20, 2006	Anderson Mesa	LONEOS	·	1.0 km	MPC · JPL
625687	2006 KE_{28}	—	May 20, 2006	Kitt Peak	Spacewatch	·	820 m	MPC · JPL
625688	2006 KZ_{32}	—	May 20, 2006	Kitt Peak	Spacewatch	·	510 m	MPC · JPL
625689	2006 KD_{36}	—	May 20, 2006	Kitt Peak	Spacewatch	·	860 m	MPC · JPL
625690	2006 KO_{36}	—	May 21, 2006	Kitt Peak	Spacewatch	·	560 m	MPC · JPL
625691	2006 KT_{45}	—	May 21, 2006	Mount Lemmon	Mount Lemmon Survey	·	1.8 km	MPC · JPL
625692	2006 KA_{49}	—	May 21, 2006	Kitt Peak	Spacewatch	·	430 m	MPC · JPL
625693	2006 KT_{53}	—	May 6, 2006	Mount Lemmon	Mount Lemmon Survey	3:2	4.6 km	MPC · JPL
625694	2006 KM_{56}	—	April 20, 2006	Kitt Peak	Spacewatch	H	430 m	MPC · JPL
625695	2006 KS_{57}	—	May 7, 2006	Mount Lemmon	Mount Lemmon Survey	·	780 m	MPC · JPL
625696	2006 KZ_{73}	—	May 23, 2006	Kitt Peak	Spacewatch	·	2.0 km	MPC · JPL
625697	2006 KT_{95}	—	May 1, 2006	Kitt Peak	Spacewatch	·	960 m	MPC · JPL
625698	2006 KU_{119}	—	May 23, 2006	Kitt Peak	Spacewatch	·	1.1 km	MPC · JPL
625699	2006 KA_{120}	—	May 23, 2006	Kitt Peak	Spacewatch	·	1.4 km	MPC · JPL
625700	2006 KP_{131}	—	May 25, 2006	Mauna Kea	P. A. Wiegert	·	1.5 km	MPC · JPL

== 625701–625800 ==
back to top

Designation			Discovery			Properties		Ref
Permanent	Provisional	Named after	Date	Site	Discoverer(s)	Category	Diam.	Ref
625701	2006 KA_{141}	—	February 9, 2005	Mount Lemmon	Mount Lemmon Survey	·	2.7 km	MPC · JPL
625702	2006 KC_{146}	—	May 22, 2006	Mount Lemmon	Mount Lemmon Survey	PHO	750 m	MPC · JPL
625703	2006 KY_{146}	—	April 10, 2010	Mount Lemmon	Mount Lemmon Survey	·	1.1 km	MPC · JPL
625704	2006 KY_{152}	—	June 26, 2015	Haleakala	Pan-STARRS 1	·	1.1 km	MPC · JPL
625705	2006 KM_{154}	—	October 21, 2014	Mount Lemmon	Mount Lemmon Survey	THM	1.6 km	MPC · JPL
625706	2006 KV_{154}	—	May 21, 2006	Kitt Peak	Spacewatch	·	460 m	MPC · JPL
625707	2006 KG_{155}	—	May 20, 2006	Kitt Peak	Spacewatch	·	1.1 km	MPC · JPL
625708	2006 MV_{16}	—	June 20, 2006	Mount Lemmon	Mount Lemmon Survey	·	570 m	MPC · JPL
625709	2006 OT_{34}	—	July 21, 2006	Mount Lemmon	Mount Lemmon Survey	·	880 m	MPC · JPL
625710	2006 OG_{38}	—	July 21, 2006	Mount Lemmon	Mount Lemmon Survey	·	730 m	MPC · JPL
625711	2006 OJ_{38}	—	July 18, 2006	Mount Lemmon	Mount Lemmon Survey	·	500 m	MPC · JPL
625712	2006 OM_{40}	—	July 21, 2006	Mount Lemmon	Mount Lemmon Survey	·	2.1 km	MPC · JPL
625713	2006 PK	—	July 21, 2006	Mount Lemmon	Mount Lemmon Survey	·	420 m	MPC · JPL
625714	2006 PU_{4}	—	August 16, 2006	Siding Spring	SSS	(5)	1.3 km	MPC · JPL
625715	2006 PJ_{12}	—	August 13, 2006	Palomar	NEAT	·	1.2 km	MPC · JPL
625716	2006 PD_{38}	—	June 1, 2006	Kitt Peak	Spacewatch	·	1.4 km	MPC · JPL
625717	2006 PB_{44}	—	November 12, 2010	Mount Lemmon	Mount Lemmon Survey	·	680 m	MPC · JPL
625718	2006 QB_{3}	—	August 19, 2006	Kitt Peak	Spacewatch	·	1.5 km	MPC · JPL
625719	2006 QT_{4}	—	August 18, 2006	Piszkés-tető	K. Sárneczky	·	600 m	MPC · JPL
625720	2006 QH_{6}	—	August 17, 2006	Palomar	NEAT	H	550 m	MPC · JPL
625721	2006 QX_{10}	—	August 20, 2006	Pla D'Arguines	R. Ferrando, Ferrando, M.	AGN	1.0 km	MPC · JPL
625722	2006 QA_{12}	—	August 16, 2006	Siding Spring	SSS	·	1.3 km	MPC · JPL
625723	2006 QY_{21}	—	August 19, 2006	Anderson Mesa	LONEOS	(5)	1.1 km	MPC · JPL
625724	2006 QG_{24}	—	August 17, 2006	Palomar	NEAT	·	1.2 km	MPC · JPL
625725	2006 QN_{24}	—	July 25, 2006	Palomar	NEAT	·	1.7 km	MPC · JPL
625726	2006 QD_{42}	—	August 17, 2006	Palomar	NEAT	EUP	3.0 km	MPC · JPL
625727	2006 QU_{50}	—	August 22, 2006	Palomar	NEAT	·	1.3 km	MPC · JPL
625728	2006 QP_{51}	—	July 18, 2006	Siding Spring	SSS	·	580 m	MPC · JPL
625729	2006 QX_{51}	—	August 23, 2006	Palomar	NEAT	·	1.5 km	MPC · JPL
625730	2006 QT_{58}	—	May 31, 2006	Mount Lemmon	Mount Lemmon Survey	·	2.6 km	MPC · JPL
625731	2006 QR_{68}	—	July 25, 2006	Mount Lemmon	Mount Lemmon Survey	·	1.4 km	MPC · JPL
625732	2006 QF_{72}	—	August 21, 2006	Kitt Peak	Spacewatch	·	520 m	MPC · JPL
625733	2006 QC_{78}	—	August 22, 2006	Palomar	NEAT	·	1.4 km	MPC · JPL
625734	2006 QH_{83}	—	August 27, 2006	Kitt Peak	Spacewatch	EUN	1.1 km	MPC · JPL
625735	2006 QG_{90}	—	May 24, 2006	Mount Lemmon	Mount Lemmon Survey	·	630 m	MPC · JPL
625736	2006 QM_{98}	—	August 22, 2006	Palomar	NEAT	·	590 m	MPC · JPL
625737	2006 QV_{100}	—	August 25, 2006	Lulin	LUSS	·	1.3 km	MPC · JPL
625738	2006 QU_{101}	—	August 19, 2006	Kitt Peak	Spacewatch	·	740 m	MPC · JPL
625739	2006 QU_{111}	—	August 22, 2006	Palomar	NEAT	·	1.7 km	MPC · JPL
625740	2006 QL_{112}	—	August 23, 2006	Palomar	NEAT	·	610 m	MPC · JPL
625741	2006 QJ_{127}	—	August 16, 2006	Siding Spring	SSS	·	2.0 km	MPC · JPL
625742	2006 QB_{138}	—	August 28, 2006	Kitt Peak	Spacewatch	NYS	590 m	MPC · JPL
625743	2006 QY_{142}	—	August 19, 2006	Kitt Peak	Spacewatch	·	1.5 km	MPC · JPL
625744	2006 QN_{152}	—	August 19, 2006	Kitt Peak	Spacewatch	·	890 m	MPC · JPL
625745	2006 QY_{154}	—	August 28, 2006	Catalina	CSS	·	1.2 km	MPC · JPL
625746	2006 QC_{159}	—	August 19, 2006	Kitt Peak	Spacewatch	·	930 m	MPC · JPL
625747	2006 QZ_{169}	—	August 29, 2006	Anderson Mesa	LONEOS	·	1.6 km	MPC · JPL
625748	2006 QH_{178}	—	August 27, 2006	Kitt Peak	Spacewatch	·	540 m	MPC · JPL
625749	2006 QX_{186}	—	August 19, 2006	Kitt Peak	Spacewatch	·	1.0 km	MPC · JPL
625750	2006 QA_{187}	—	April 10, 2005	Kitt Peak	Spacewatch	·	700 m	MPC · JPL
625751	2006 QK_{188}	—	August 27, 2006	Kitt Peak	Spacewatch	·	620 m	MPC · JPL
625752	2006 QM_{188}	—	December 7, 2002	Socorro	LINEAR	·	1.2 km	MPC · JPL
625753	2006 QH_{190}	—	August 19, 2006	Kitt Peak	Spacewatch	BAR	850 m	MPC · JPL
625754	2006 QK_{190}	—	January 24, 2014	Haleakala	Pan-STARRS 1	·	2.9 km	MPC · JPL
625755	2006 QN_{190}	—	October 5, 2013	Haleakala	Pan-STARRS 1	·	690 m	MPC · JPL
625756	2006 QN_{191}	—	August 21, 2006	Kitt Peak	Spacewatch	·	570 m	MPC · JPL
625757	2006 QL_{192}	—	August 19, 2006	Kitt Peak	Spacewatch	JUN	730 m	MPC · JPL
625758	2006 QB_{193}	—	August 28, 2006	Kitt Peak	Spacewatch	·	1.1 km	MPC · JPL
625759	2006 QT_{198}	—	August 19, 2006	Kitt Peak	Spacewatch	·	1.5 km	MPC · JPL
625760	2006 QH_{199}	—	July 23, 2015	Haleakala	Pan-STARRS 2	DOR	1.8 km	MPC · JPL
625761	2006 QW_{199}	—	February 28, 2014	Haleakala	Pan-STARRS 1	GEF	850 m	MPC · JPL
625762	2006 QQ_{203}	—	August 19, 2006	Kitt Peak	Spacewatch	·	640 m	MPC · JPL
625763	2006 QQ_{204}	—	August 29, 2006	Kitt Peak	Spacewatch	·	2.6 km	MPC · JPL
625764	2006 QV_{207}	—	August 29, 2006	Lulin	LUSS	·	920 m	MPC · JPL
625765	2006 RS	—	September 3, 2006	Wrightwood	J. W. Young	·	960 m	MPC · JPL
625766	2006 RB_{1}	—	September 4, 2006	Marly	P. Kocher	·	1.0 km	MPC · JPL
625767	2006 RT_{1}	—	August 27, 2006	Kitt Peak	Spacewatch	·	410 m	MPC · JPL
625768	2006 RV_{9}	—	August 28, 2006	Kitt Peak	Spacewatch	·	850 m	MPC · JPL
625769	2006 RG_{10}	—	September 15, 2006	Kitt Peak	Spacewatch	·	780 m	MPC · JPL
625770	2006 RJ_{21}	—	September 15, 2006	Kitt Peak	Spacewatch	·	460 m	MPC · JPL
625771	2006 RX_{23}	—	September 13, 2006	Palomar	NEAT	·	1.7 km	MPC · JPL
625772	2006 RP_{25}	—	September 14, 2006	Kitt Peak	Spacewatch	·	1.3 km	MPC · JPL
625773	2006 RA_{27}	—	September 14, 2006	Catalina	CSS	·	1.5 km	MPC · JPL
625774	2006 RJ_{30}	—	September 15, 2006	Kitt Peak	Spacewatch	·	1.6 km	MPC · JPL
625775	2006 RD_{35}	—	September 14, 2006	Palomar	NEAT	·	1.5 km	MPC · JPL
625776	2006 RW_{44}	—	September 14, 2006	Kitt Peak	Spacewatch	·	1.3 km	MPC · JPL
625777	2006 RN_{45}	—	July 22, 2006	Mount Lemmon	Mount Lemmon Survey	·	1.2 km	MPC · JPL
625778	2006 RW_{52}	—	September 14, 2006	Kitt Peak	Spacewatch	MRX	700 m	MPC · JPL
625779	2006 RM_{64}	—	September 13, 2006	Palomar	NEAT	TIN	800 m	MPC · JPL
625780	2006 RJ_{67}	—	September 15, 2006	Kitt Peak	Spacewatch	·	1.2 km	MPC · JPL
625781	2006 RP_{68}	—	September 15, 2006	Kitt Peak	Spacewatch	·	910 m	MPC · JPL
625782	2006 RD_{81}	—	September 15, 2006	Kitt Peak	Spacewatch	AEO	840 m	MPC · JPL
625783	2006 RR_{82}	—	September 15, 2006	Kitt Peak	Spacewatch	·	1.4 km	MPC · JPL
625784	2006 RH_{109}	—	September 25, 2006	Mount Lemmon	Mount Lemmon Survey	·	2.4 km	MPC · JPL
625785	2006 RS_{110}	—	September 25, 2006	Kitt Peak	Spacewatch	·	2.4 km	MPC · JPL
625786	2006 RL_{113}	—	September 18, 2006	Kitt Peak	Spacewatch	·	1.3 km	MPC · JPL
625787	2006 RS_{121}	—	September 15, 2006	Kitt Peak	Spacewatch	·	990 m	MPC · JPL
625788	2006 SA_{6}	—	September 16, 2006	Catalina	CSS	AMO	480 m	MPC · JPL
625789	2006 SR_{14}	—	September 17, 2006	Catalina	CSS	·	700 m	MPC · JPL
625790	2006 ST_{21}	—	August 29, 2006	Anderson Mesa	LONEOS	·	560 m	MPC · JPL
625791	2006 SX_{23}	—	September 18, 2006	Anderson Mesa	LONEOS	CLO	1.6 km	MPC · JPL
625792	2006 SJ_{26}	—	September 16, 2006	Catalina	CSS	·	1.1 km	MPC · JPL
625793	2006 SS_{37}	—	September 17, 2006	Pla D'Arguines	R. Ferrando, Ferrando, M.	H	300 m	MPC · JPL
625794	2006 SH_{39}	—	September 18, 2006	Kitt Peak	Spacewatch	·	720 m	MPC · JPL
625795	2006 SM_{47}	—	September 12, 2006	Catalina	CSS	·	570 m	MPC · JPL
625796	2006 SW_{52}	—	September 19, 2006	Anderson Mesa	LONEOS	·	660 m	MPC · JPL
625797	2006 SR_{64}	—	September 20, 2006	Bergisch Gladbach	W. Bickel	·	3.1 km	MPC · JPL
625798	2006 SD_{65}	—	September 19, 2006	Kitt Peak	Spacewatch	·	2.3 km	MPC · JPL
625799	2006 SR_{69}	—	September 15, 2006	Kitt Peak	Spacewatch	·	420 m	MPC · JPL
625800	2006 SK_{70}	—	September 19, 2006	Kitt Peak	Spacewatch	·	1.6 km	MPC · JPL

== 625801–625900 ==
back to top

Designation			Discovery			Properties		Ref
Permanent	Provisional	Named after	Date	Site	Discoverer(s)	Category	Diam.	Ref
625801	2006 SU_{84}	—	September 18, 2006	Kitt Peak	Spacewatch	·	1.3 km	MPC · JPL
625802	2006 SA_{86}	—	September 18, 2006	Kitt Peak	Spacewatch	·	1.2 km	MPC · JPL
625803	2006 SB_{86}	—	September 18, 2006	Kitt Peak	Spacewatch	·	1.1 km	MPC · JPL
625804	2006 SS_{89}	—	September 18, 2006	Kitt Peak	Spacewatch	·	760 m	MPC · JPL
625805	2006 SJ_{119}	—	September 18, 2006	Catalina	CSS	·	1.3 km	MPC · JPL
625806	2006 SJ_{125}	—	September 20, 2006	Catalina	CSS	·	1.3 km	MPC · JPL
625807	2006 SQ_{130}	—	September 23, 2006	Kitt Peak	Spacewatch	·	450 m	MPC · JPL
625808	2006 SH_{147}	—	September 19, 2006	Kitt Peak	Spacewatch	·	560 m	MPC · JPL
625809	2006 SE_{148}	—	September 19, 2006	Catalina	CSS	·	1.4 km	MPC · JPL
625810	2006 SX_{151}	—	September 19, 2006	Kitt Peak	Spacewatch	·	1.1 km	MPC · JPL
625811	2006 SC_{157}	—	September 15, 2006	Kitt Peak	Spacewatch	·	1.4 km	MPC · JPL
625812	2006 SH_{163}	—	September 24, 2006	Kitt Peak	Spacewatch	·	1.4 km	MPC · JPL
625813	2006 SE_{166}	—	September 25, 2006	Kitt Peak	Spacewatch	·	530 m	MPC · JPL
625814	2006 SD_{170}	—	September 17, 2006	Kitt Peak	Spacewatch	·	500 m	MPC · JPL
625815	2006 SB_{178}	—	September 16, 2006	Kitt Peak	Spacewatch	·	560 m	MPC · JPL
625816	2006 SN_{192}	—	September 26, 2006	Mount Lemmon	Mount Lemmon Survey	·	470 m	MPC · JPL
625817	2006 SQ_{195}	—	September 19, 2006	Kitt Peak	Spacewatch	·	1.1 km	MPC · JPL
625818	2006 SJ_{196}	—	September 26, 2006	Mount Lemmon	Mount Lemmon Survey	·	570 m	MPC · JPL
625819	2006 SB_{209}	—	September 26, 2006	Kitt Peak	Spacewatch	MAS	530 m	MPC · JPL
625820	2006 SZ_{220}	—	September 15, 2006	Kitt Peak	Spacewatch	·	1.3 km	MPC · JPL
625821	2006 SV_{221}	—	September 15, 2006	Kitt Peak	Spacewatch	·	1.4 km	MPC · JPL
625822	2006 SW_{221}	—	September 25, 2006	Mount Lemmon	Mount Lemmon Survey	·	1.2 km	MPC · JPL
625823	2006 SW_{222}	—	September 25, 2006	Anderson Mesa	LONEOS	·	750 m	MPC · JPL
625824	2006 SD_{227}	—	September 26, 2006	Kitt Peak	Spacewatch	·	520 m	MPC · JPL
625825	2006 SA_{229}	—	September 26, 2006	Kitt Peak	Spacewatch	·	690 m	MPC · JPL
625826	2006 SP_{237}	—	September 26, 2006	Mount Lemmon	Mount Lemmon Survey	VER	2.5 km	MPC · JPL
625827	2006 SC_{239}	—	July 25, 2006	Mount Lemmon	Mount Lemmon Survey	·	1.0 km	MPC · JPL
625828	2006 SB_{244}	—	September 18, 2006	Kitt Peak	Spacewatch	·	680 m	MPC · JPL
625829	2006 SV_{248}	—	September 26, 2006	Kitt Peak	Spacewatch	·	500 m	MPC · JPL
625830	2006 SY_{252}	—	September 18, 2006	Kitt Peak	Spacewatch	·	1.4 km	MPC · JPL
625831	2006 SN_{256}	—	September 15, 2006	Kitt Peak	Spacewatch	·	1.2 km	MPC · JPL
625832	2006 SA_{259}	—	September 26, 2006	Kitt Peak	Spacewatch	·	1.2 km	MPC · JPL
625833	2006 SW_{262}	—	September 26, 2006	Mount Lemmon	Mount Lemmon Survey	·	1.3 km	MPC · JPL
625834	2006 SR_{269}	—	September 26, 2006	Mount Lemmon	Mount Lemmon Survey	·	1.6 km	MPC · JPL
625835	2006 SV_{269}	—	September 26, 2006	Mount Lemmon	Mount Lemmon Survey	·	540 m	MPC · JPL
625836	2006 SP_{272}	—	July 21, 2006	Mount Lemmon	Mount Lemmon Survey	·	540 m	MPC · JPL
625837	2006 SG_{276}	—	August 29, 2006	Kitt Peak	Spacewatch	(5)	940 m	MPC · JPL
625838	2006 SX_{283}	—	September 26, 2006	Catalina	CSS	·	1.2 km	MPC · JPL
625839	2006 SF_{288}	—	September 25, 2006	Catalina	CSS	·	3.1 km	MPC · JPL
625840	2006 SS_{288}	—	September 19, 2006	Catalina	CSS	·	850 m	MPC · JPL
625841	2006 SE_{294}	—	September 17, 2006	Kitt Peak	Spacewatch	·	1.2 km	MPC · JPL
625842	2006 SY_{294}	—	September 17, 2006	Kitt Peak	Spacewatch	·	520 m	MPC · JPL
625843	2006 SE_{295}	—	September 17, 2006	Kitt Peak	Spacewatch	·	1.3 km	MPC · JPL
625844	2006 SC_{307}	—	September 27, 2006	Kitt Peak	Spacewatch	·	800 m	MPC · JPL
625845	2006 SB_{310}	—	September 17, 2006	Kitt Peak	Spacewatch	·	540 m	MPC · JPL
625846	2006 SW_{319}	—	September 27, 2006	Kitt Peak	Spacewatch	·	720 m	MPC · JPL
625847	2006 SB_{323}	—	September 27, 2006	Kitt Peak	Spacewatch	·	1.3 km	MPC · JPL
625848	2006 SG_{326}	—	September 19, 2006	Kitt Peak	Spacewatch	NEM	1.6 km	MPC · JPL
625849	2006 SF_{328}	—	September 27, 2006	Kitt Peak	Spacewatch	·	850 m	MPC · JPL
625850	2006 SF_{333}	—	September 28, 2006	Kitt Peak	Spacewatch	(2076)	570 m	MPC · JPL
625851	2006 SV_{333}	—	September 28, 2006	Kitt Peak	Spacewatch	·	530 m	MPC · JPL
625852	2006 SC_{335}	—	May 12, 2005	Palomar	NEAT	EUN	1.1 km	MPC · JPL
625853	2006 SQ_{339}	—	September 28, 2006	Kitt Peak	Spacewatch	·	940 m	MPC · JPL
625854	2006 SQ_{340}	—	September 28, 2006	Kitt Peak	Spacewatch	·	510 m	MPC · JPL
625855	2006 SE_{343}	—	September 28, 2006	Kitt Peak	Spacewatch	(5)	820 m	MPC · JPL
625856	2006 SP_{359}	—	September 30, 2006	Kitt Peak	Spacewatch	HOF	1.9 km	MPC · JPL
625857	2006 SV_{367}	—	September 28, 2006	Catalina	CSS	·	1.7 km	MPC · JPL
625858	2006 SW_{376}	—	September 17, 2006	Apache Point	SDSS Collaboration	·	970 m	MPC · JPL
625859	2006 SG_{383}	—	September 29, 2006	Apache Point	SDSS Collaboration	·	1.2 km	MPC · JPL
625860	2006 SS_{383}	—	September 29, 2006	Apache Point	SDSS Collaboration	·	990 m	MPC · JPL
625861	2006 SN_{385}	—	September 29, 2006	Apache Point	SDSS Collaboration	·	910 m	MPC · JPL
625862	2006 SR_{388}	—	September 30, 2006	Apache Point	SDSS Collaboration	·	3.2 km	MPC · JPL
625863	2006 SY_{389}	—	September 30, 2006	Apache Point	SDSS Collaboration	·	880 m	MPC · JPL
625864	2006 SJ_{396}	—	September 17, 2006	Kitt Peak	Spacewatch	·	1.5 km	MPC · JPL
625865	2006 SP_{399}	—	September 17, 2006	Kitt Peak	Spacewatch	LEO	1.4 km	MPC · JPL
625866	2006 SC_{402}	—	September 28, 2006	Mount Lemmon	Mount Lemmon Survey	·	720 m	MPC · JPL
625867	2006 SU_{405}	—	September 17, 2006	Kitt Peak	Spacewatch	·	1.4 km	MPC · JPL
625868	2006 SW_{411}	—	September 28, 2006	Goodricke-Pigott	R. A. Tucker	·	1.6 km	MPC · JPL
625869	2006 SH_{412}	—	September 27, 2006	Mount Lemmon	Mount Lemmon Survey	NYS	620 m	MPC · JPL
625870	2006 SW_{412}	—	September 16, 2006	Catalina	CSS	·	1.4 km	MPC · JPL
625871	2006 SM_{413}	—	September 28, 2006	Catalina	CSS	·	870 m	MPC · JPL
625872	2006 SZ_{417}	—	January 3, 2014	Kitt Peak	Spacewatch	·	1.9 km	MPC · JPL
625873	2006 SP_{423}	—	September 27, 2006	Mount Lemmon	Mount Lemmon Survey	·	580 m	MPC · JPL
625874	2006 SG_{424}	—	September 30, 2006	Mount Lemmon	Mount Lemmon Survey	·	470 m	MPC · JPL
625875	2006 SN_{425}	—	December 7, 2012	Nogales	M. Schwartz, P. R. Holvorcem	·	3.2 km	MPC · JPL
625876	2006 SX_{425}	—	September 18, 2006	Kitt Peak	Spacewatch	·	550 m	MPC · JPL
625877	2006 SJ_{426}	—	September 30, 2006	Mount Lemmon	Mount Lemmon Survey	·	600 m	MPC · JPL
625878	2006 SE_{427}	—	March 4, 2016	Haleakala	Pan-STARRS 1	H	350 m	MPC · JPL
625879	2006 ST_{427}	—	September 18, 2006	Kitt Peak	Spacewatch	·	1.1 km	MPC · JPL
625880	2006 SO_{430}	—	October 9, 2016	Mount Lemmon	Mount Lemmon Survey	·	520 m	MPC · JPL
625881	2006 SR_{432}	—	October 10, 1993	Kitt Peak	Spacewatch	·	1.1 km	MPC · JPL
625882	2006 SZ_{433}	—	October 7, 1996	Kitt Peak	Spacewatch	·	530 m	MPC · JPL
625883	2006 SR_{434}	—	September 18, 2006	Kitt Peak	Spacewatch	·	1.3 km	MPC · JPL
625884	2006 SZ_{435}	—	September 30, 2006	Mount Lemmon	Mount Lemmon Survey	·	500 m	MPC · JPL
625885	2006 SG_{436}	—	September 27, 2006	Catalina	CSS	·	640 m	MPC · JPL
625886	2006 SS_{436}	—	February 26, 2014	Mount Lemmon	Mount Lemmon Survey	·	2.1 km	MPC · JPL
625887	2006 SB_{438}	—	September 17, 2006	Kitt Peak	Spacewatch	·	1.5 km	MPC · JPL
625888	2006 SO_{439}	—	September 12, 2015	Haleakala	Pan-STARRS 1	·	1.1 km	MPC · JPL
625889	2006 ST_{439}	—	March 7, 2008	Mount Lemmon	Mount Lemmon Survey	·	580 m	MPC · JPL
625890	2006 SU_{439}	—	September 28, 2006	Mount Lemmon	Mount Lemmon Survey	·	630 m	MPC · JPL
625891	2006 SN_{441}	—	October 24, 2011	Haleakala	Pan-STARRS 1	·	1.2 km	MPC · JPL
625892	2006 SS_{442}	—	October 18, 1998	Kitt Peak	Spacewatch	·	790 m	MPC · JPL
625893	2006 ST_{442}	—	September 17, 2006	Kitt Peak	Spacewatch	·	1.1 km	MPC · JPL
625894	2006 SD_{443}	—	October 17, 2015	Cerro Paranal	Altmann, M., Prusti, T.	·	1.1 km	MPC · JPL
625895	2006 SD_{444}	—	September 26, 2006	Mount Lemmon	Mount Lemmon Survey	·	1.2 km	MPC · JPL
625896	2006 SF_{445}	—	September 18, 2006	Kitt Peak	Spacewatch	·	1.0 km	MPC · JPL
625897	2006 SQ_{446}	—	September 20, 2006	Kitt Peak	Spacewatch	·	770 m	MPC · JPL
625898	2006 SW_{447}	—	September 26, 2006	Mount Lemmon	Mount Lemmon Survey	·	610 m	MPC · JPL
625899	2006 SX_{447}	—	September 30, 2006	Mount Lemmon	Mount Lemmon Survey	·	510 m	MPC · JPL
625900	2006 SD_{448}	—	September 17, 2006	Kitt Peak	Spacewatch	·	1.3 km	MPC · JPL

== 625901–626000 ==
back to top

Designation			Discovery			Properties		Ref
Permanent	Provisional	Named after	Date	Site	Discoverer(s)	Category	Diam.	Ref
625901	2006 SF_{448}	—	September 26, 2006	Kitt Peak	Spacewatch	·	1.3 km	MPC · JPL
625902	2006 SR_{454}	—	September 30, 2006	Mount Lemmon	Mount Lemmon Survey	NEM	1.7 km	MPC · JPL
625903	2006 SP_{458}	—	September 16, 2006	Catalina	CSS	·	1.3 km	MPC · JPL
625904	2006 TP_{11}	—	September 17, 2006	Kitt Peak	Spacewatch	·	1.1 km	MPC · JPL
625905	2006 TZ_{24}	—	October 12, 2006	Kitt Peak	Spacewatch	MAS	460 m	MPC · JPL
625906	2006 TH_{29}	—	September 30, 2006	Mount Lemmon	Mount Lemmon Survey	NYS	720 m	MPC · JPL
625907	2006 TZ_{35}	—	October 12, 2006	Kitt Peak	Spacewatch	DOR	1.4 km	MPC · JPL
625908	2006 TW_{39}	—	October 12, 2006	Kitt Peak	Spacewatch	KOR	1.1 km	MPC · JPL
625909	2006 TO_{40}	—	September 28, 2006	Mount Lemmon	Mount Lemmon Survey	·	590 m	MPC · JPL
625910	2006 TO_{41}	—	October 12, 2006	Palomar	NEAT	·	530 m	MPC · JPL
625911	2006 TY_{43}	—	September 30, 2006	Mount Lemmon	Mount Lemmon Survey	·	1.2 km	MPC · JPL
625912	2006 TT_{50}	—	September 25, 2006	Mount Lemmon	Mount Lemmon Survey	·	1.1 km	MPC · JPL
625913	2006 TK_{57}	—	September 26, 2006	Mount Lemmon	Mount Lemmon Survey	·	730 m	MPC · JPL
625914	2006 TR_{64}	—	July 21, 2006	Mount Lemmon	Mount Lemmon Survey	EUN	960 m	MPC · JPL
625915	2006 TA_{68}	—	October 11, 2006	Palomar	NEAT	DOR	1.9 km	MPC · JPL
625916	2006 TW_{70}	—	September 30, 2006	Catalina	CSS	·	560 m	MPC · JPL
625917	2006 TK_{93}	—	September 28, 2006	Mount Lemmon	Mount Lemmon Survey	·	460 m	MPC · JPL
625918	2006 TY_{96}	—	October 12, 2006	Kitt Peak	Spacewatch	·	2.1 km	MPC · JPL
625919	2006 TS_{98}	—	October 15, 2006	Kitt Peak	Spacewatch	·	1.2 km	MPC · JPL
625920	2006 TP_{102}	—	October 15, 2006	Kitt Peak	Spacewatch	·	1.7 km	MPC · JPL
625921	2006 TD_{111}	—	September 17, 2006	Apache Point	SDSS Collaboration	·	1.0 km	MPC · JPL
625922	2006 TS_{112}	—	October 1, 2006	Apache Point	SDSS Collaboration	·	560 m	MPC · JPL
625923	2006 TP_{113}	—	October 1, 2006	Apache Point	SDSS Collaboration	·	1.4 km	MPC · JPL
625924	2006 TR_{116}	—	October 2, 2006	Apache Point	SDSS Collaboration	·	1.6 km	MPC · JPL
625925	2006 TZ_{118}	—	September 18, 2006	Apache Point	SDSS Collaboration	·	1.2 km	MPC · JPL
625926	2006 TG_{123}	—	October 13, 2006	Kitt Peak	Spacewatch	·	1.1 km	MPC · JPL
625927	2006 TC_{127}	—	October 3, 2006	Kitt Peak	Spacewatch	BRG	1.0 km	MPC · JPL
625928	2006 TQ_{129}	—	October 4, 2006	Mount Lemmon	Mount Lemmon Survey	·	1.2 km	MPC · JPL
625929	2006 TT_{129}	—	October 11, 2006	Palomar	NEAT	·	1.4 km	MPC · JPL
625930	2006 TH_{131}	—	October 3, 2006	Mount Lemmon	Mount Lemmon Survey	·	1.3 km	MPC · JPL
625931	2006 TV_{131}	—	October 2, 2006	Mount Lemmon	Mount Lemmon Survey	NYS	830 m	MPC · JPL
625932	2006 TC_{132}	—	October 2, 2006	Mount Lemmon	Mount Lemmon Survey	·	1.3 km	MPC · JPL
625933	2006 TJ_{132}	—	October 2, 2006	Mount Lemmon	Mount Lemmon Survey	AEO	800 m	MPC · JPL
625934	2006 TC_{135}	—	October 24, 2015	Haleakala	Pan-STARRS 1	·	1.2 km	MPC · JPL
625935	2006 TC_{139}	—	January 22, 2015	Haleakala	Pan-STARRS 1	·	2.4 km	MPC · JPL
625936	2006 TE_{140}	—	October 3, 2006	Mount Lemmon	Mount Lemmon Survey	·	960 m	MPC · JPL
625937	2006 TT_{140}	—	October 2, 2006	Mount Lemmon	Mount Lemmon Survey	·	570 m	MPC · JPL
625938	2006 TJ_{142}	—	October 4, 2006	Mount Lemmon	Mount Lemmon Survey	·	500 m	MPC · JPL
625939	2006 UQ	—	October 16, 2006	Kitt Peak	Spacewatch	·	670 m	MPC · JPL
625940	2006 UX_{11}	—	September 30, 2006	Mount Lemmon	Mount Lemmon Survey	·	1.6 km	MPC · JPL
625941	2006 UM_{15}	—	October 17, 2006	Mount Lemmon	Mount Lemmon Survey	·	720 m	MPC · JPL
625942	2006 UQ_{15}	—	September 30, 2006	Mount Lemmon	Mount Lemmon Survey	·	520 m	MPC · JPL
625943	2006 UZ_{16}	—	September 26, 2006	Mount Lemmon	Mount Lemmon Survey	·	390 m	MPC · JPL
625944	2006 UT_{18}	—	September 25, 2006	Kitt Peak	Spacewatch	·	890 m	MPC · JPL
625945	2006 UP_{22}	—	September 15, 2006	Kitt Peak	Spacewatch	·	1.2 km	MPC · JPL
625946	2006 UR_{23}	—	October 16, 2006	Kitt Peak	Spacewatch	·	1.4 km	MPC · JPL
625947	2006 UP_{25}	—	October 16, 2006	Kitt Peak	Spacewatch	NEM	1.8 km	MPC · JPL
625948	2006 UV_{25}	—	October 16, 2006	Kitt Peak	Spacewatch	·	630 m	MPC · JPL
625949	2006 UK_{32}	—	October 12, 2006	Kitt Peak	Spacewatch	·	1.0 km	MPC · JPL
625950	2006 UN_{33}	—	October 4, 2006	Mount Lemmon	Mount Lemmon Survey	·	710 m	MPC · JPL
625951	2006 UJ_{45}	—	September 30, 2006	Mount Lemmon	Mount Lemmon Survey	·	810 m	MPC · JPL
625952	2006 UO_{45}	—	October 16, 2006	Kitt Peak	Spacewatch	·	1.3 km	MPC · JPL
625953	2006 UG_{48}	—	October 17, 2006	Kitt Peak	Spacewatch	·	3.2 km	MPC · JPL
625954	2006 UK_{51}	—	October 17, 2006	Mount Lemmon	Mount Lemmon Survey	·	1.2 km	MPC · JPL
625955	2006 UU_{60}	—	October 19, 2006	Mount Lemmon	Mount Lemmon Survey	MRX	670 m	MPC · JPL
625956	2006 UT_{66}	—	August 24, 2006	Lulin	LUSS	·	770 m	MPC · JPL
625957	2006 UR_{68}	—	October 16, 2006	Catalina	CSS	·	580 m	MPC · JPL
625958	2006 UC_{72}	—	October 17, 2006	Kitt Peak	Spacewatch	LUT	3.5 km	MPC · JPL
625959	2006 UO_{82}	—	October 17, 2006	Kitt Peak	Spacewatch	·	620 m	MPC · JPL
625960	2006 UT_{83}	—	September 30, 2006	Mount Lemmon	Mount Lemmon Survey	·	1.2 km	MPC · JPL
625961	2006 UM_{84}	—	October 17, 2006	Mount Lemmon	Mount Lemmon Survey	·	610 m	MPC · JPL
625962	2006 UZ_{86}	—	October 17, 2006	Mount Lemmon	Mount Lemmon Survey	·	1.4 km	MPC · JPL
625963	2006 UQ_{95}	—	October 18, 2006	Kitt Peak	Spacewatch	·	1.4 km	MPC · JPL
625964	2006 UU_{95}	—	October 18, 2006	Kitt Peak	Spacewatch	·	1.1 km	MPC · JPL
625965	2006 UW_{95}	—	October 2, 2006	Mount Lemmon	Mount Lemmon Survey	·	480 m	MPC · JPL
625966	2006 UD_{106}	—	October 18, 2006	Kitt Peak	Spacewatch	·	1.4 km	MPC · JPL
625967	2006 UC_{108}	—	October 3, 2006	Mount Lemmon	Mount Lemmon Survey	HNS	1.0 km	MPC · JPL
625968	2006 UN_{111}	—	October 19, 2006	Kitt Peak	Spacewatch	·	1.2 km	MPC · JPL
625969	2006 UM_{114}	—	October 19, 2006	Kitt Peak	Spacewatch	KOR	1.2 km	MPC · JPL
625970	2006 UY_{118}	—	October 4, 2006	Mount Lemmon	Mount Lemmon Survey	·	940 m	MPC · JPL
625971	2006 UX_{126}	—	September 28, 2006	Mount Lemmon	Mount Lemmon Survey	·	2.4 km	MPC · JPL
625972	2006 UC_{130}	—	October 19, 2006	Kitt Peak	Spacewatch	·	1.1 km	MPC · JPL
625973	2006 UZ_{130}	—	October 19, 2006	Kitt Peak	Spacewatch	·	530 m	MPC · JPL
625974	2006 UC_{131}	—	October 19, 2006	Kitt Peak	Spacewatch	·	1.2 km	MPC · JPL
625975	2006 UD_{138}	—	October 4, 2006	Mount Lemmon	Mount Lemmon Survey	·	1.3 km	MPC · JPL
625976	2006 UV_{138}	—	October 19, 2006	Kitt Peak	Spacewatch	(1547)	1.3 km	MPC · JPL
625977	2006 US_{151}	—	October 20, 2006	Mount Lemmon	Mount Lemmon Survey	·	1.3 km	MPC · JPL
625978	2006 UQ_{152}	—	October 21, 2006	Kitt Peak	Spacewatch	·	750 m	MPC · JPL
625979	2006 UW_{152}	—	October 21, 2006	Kitt Peak	Spacewatch	·	520 m	MPC · JPL
625980	2006 UT_{158}	—	October 1, 2006	Kitt Peak	Spacewatch	·	680 m	MPC · JPL
625981	2006 UV_{159}	—	September 19, 2006	Kitt Peak	Spacewatch	MAS	470 m	MPC · JPL
625982	2006 UX_{162}	—	October 12, 2006	Palomar	NEAT	·	1.3 km	MPC · JPL
625983	2006 UV_{164}	—	October 21, 2006	Mount Lemmon	Mount Lemmon Survey	·	1.4 km	MPC · JPL
625984	2006 UN_{165}	—	October 2, 2006	Mount Lemmon	Mount Lemmon Survey	·	1.3 km	MPC · JPL
625985	2006 UA_{169}	—	October 3, 2006	Mount Lemmon	Mount Lemmon Survey	·	740 m	MPC · JPL
625986	2006 UB_{171}	—	October 3, 2006	Mount Lemmon	Mount Lemmon Survey	·	1.1 km	MPC · JPL
625987	2006 US_{171}	—	October 21, 2006	Mount Lemmon	Mount Lemmon Survey	·	1.2 km	MPC · JPL
625988	2006 UK_{173}	—	September 26, 2006	Mount Lemmon	Mount Lemmon Survey	·	720 m	MPC · JPL
625989	2006 UU_{176}	—	October 4, 2006	Mount Lemmon	Mount Lemmon Survey	(5)	960 m	MPC · JPL
625990	2006 US_{180}	—	October 12, 2006	Palomar	NEAT	·	780 m	MPC · JPL
625991	2006 UL_{185}	—	October 28, 2006	Catalina	CSS	ATE	190 m	MPC · JPL
625992	2006 UW_{191}	—	October 19, 2006	Catalina	CSS	·	1.5 km	MPC · JPL
625993	2006 UJ_{198}	—	October 12, 2006	Kitt Peak	Spacewatch	·	610 m	MPC · JPL
625994	2006 UH_{199}	—	October 12, 2006	Kitt Peak	Spacewatch	·	1.4 km	MPC · JPL
625995	2006 UV_{200}	—	October 21, 2006	Mount Lemmon	Mount Lemmon Survey	PHO	850 m	MPC · JPL
625996	2006 UD_{201}	—	October 21, 2006	Kitt Peak	Spacewatch	·	1.2 km	MPC · JPL
625997	2006 US_{201}	—	October 21, 2006	Kitt Peak	Spacewatch	·	1.6 km	MPC · JPL
625998	2006 UF_{210}	—	October 23, 2006	Kitt Peak	Spacewatch	·	1.2 km	MPC · JPL
625999	2006 UF_{212}	—	October 4, 2006	Mount Lemmon	Mount Lemmon Survey	·	550 m	MPC · JPL
626000	2006 UP_{213}	—	October 4, 2006	Mount Lemmon	Mount Lemmon Survey	·	570 m	MPC · JPL

back to top
