= List of minor planets: 559001–560000 =

The following is a partial list of minor planets, running from minor-planet number 559001 through 560000, inclusive. The primary data for this and other partial lists is based on JPL's "Small-Body Orbital Elements" and data available from the Minor Planet Center. Critical list information is also provided by the MPC, unless otherwise specified from Lowell Observatory. A detailed description of the table's columns and additional sources are given on the main page including a complete list of every page in this series, and a statistical break-up on the dynamical classification of minor planets.

Also see the summary list of all named bodies in numerical and alphabetical order, and the corresponding naming citations for the number range of this particular list. New namings may only be added to this list after official publication, as the preannouncement of names is condemned by the Working Group for Small Bodies Nomenclature of the International Astronomical Union.

Near-Earth obj.	MBA (inner)	MBA (outer)	Centaur
Mars-crosser	MBA (middle)	Jupiter trojan	Trans-Neptunian obj.
Unclassified

== 559001–559100 ==
Designation			Discovery			Properties		Ref
Permanent	Provisional	Named after	Date	Site	Discoverer(s)	Category	Diam.	Ref
559001	2015 BX_{340}	—	September 11, 2007	Mount Lemmon	Mount Lemmon Survey	LIX	3.1 km	MPC · JPL
559002	2015 BW_{342}	—	January 17, 2015	Haleakala	Pan-STARRS 1	·	1.7 km	MPC · JPL
559003	2015 BC_{343}	—	August 11, 2012	Bergisch Gladbach	W. Bickel	·	2.6 km	MPC · JPL
559004	2015 BC_{345}	—	November 24, 2009	Kitt Peak	Spacewatch	·	1.8 km	MPC · JPL
559005	2015 BD_{346}	—	May 31, 2011	ESA OGS	ESA OGS	·	3.5 km	MPC · JPL
559006	2015 BL_{346}	—	September 29, 2008	Catalina	CSS	·	2.4 km	MPC · JPL
559007	2015 BQ_{346}	—	January 18, 2005	Kitt Peak	Spacewatch	·	2.1 km	MPC · JPL
559008	2015 BX_{346}	—	October 23, 2008	Mount Lemmon	Mount Lemmon Survey	·	1.7 km	MPC · JPL
559009	2015 BJ_{347}	—	October 26, 2008	Mount Lemmon	Mount Lemmon Survey	·	2.8 km	MPC · JPL
559010	2015 BJ_{348}	—	November 30, 2003	Kitt Peak	Spacewatch	·	2.2 km	MPC · JPL
559011	2015 BX_{348}	—	October 25, 2009	Mount Lemmon	Mount Lemmon Survey	·	2.0 km	MPC · JPL
559012	2015 BY_{348}	—	March 27, 2011	Mount Lemmon	Mount Lemmon Survey	·	1.8 km	MPC · JPL
559013	2015 BN_{351}	—	December 29, 2014	Haleakala	Pan-STARRS 1	·	2.2 km	MPC · JPL
559014	2015 BZ_{351}	—	April 11, 1999	Kitt Peak	Spacewatch	THM	1.9 km	MPC · JPL
559015	2015 BX_{352}	—	February 18, 2010	Kitt Peak	Spacewatch	·	3.1 km	MPC · JPL
559016	2015 BD_{353}	—	October 26, 2008	Mount Lemmon	Mount Lemmon Survey	·	2.2 km	MPC · JPL
559017	2015 BF_{353}	—	September 30, 1995	Kitt Peak	Spacewatch	·	1.7 km	MPC · JPL
559018	2015 BK_{353}	—	February 17, 2010	Kitt Peak	Spacewatch	·	2.1 km	MPC · JPL
559019	2015 BC_{355}	—	November 28, 2013	Mount Lemmon	Mount Lemmon Survey	·	2.6 km	MPC · JPL
559020	2015 BE_{355}	—	April 3, 2010	Kitt Peak	Spacewatch	·	3.0 km	MPC · JPL
559021	2015 BM_{355}	—	December 21, 2014	Haleakala	Pan-STARRS 1	EOS	2.1 km	MPC · JPL
559022	2015 BP_{355}	—	August 26, 2012	Haleakala	Pan-STARRS 1	·	3.3 km	MPC · JPL
559023	2015 BR_{355}	—	April 9, 2010	Palomar	Palomar Transient Factory	·	3.4 km	MPC · JPL
559024	2015 BE_{356}	—	December 28, 2014	Mount Lemmon	Mount Lemmon Survey	·	2.5 km	MPC · JPL
559025	2015 BX_{357}	—	August 10, 2007	Kitt Peak	Spacewatch	·	1.8 km	MPC · JPL
559026	2015 BL_{362}	—	August 21, 2008	Kitt Peak	Spacewatch	KOR	1.2 km	MPC · JPL
559027	2015 BC_{365}	—	October 9, 2013	Haleakala	Pan-STARRS 1	·	1.9 km	MPC · JPL
559028	2015 BW_{369}	—	December 21, 2014	Haleakala	Pan-STARRS 1	·	1.5 km	MPC · JPL
559029	2015 BL_{374}	—	October 5, 2013	Haleakala	Pan-STARRS 1	·	1.7 km	MPC · JPL
559030	2015 BF_{376}	—	December 19, 2009	Mount Lemmon	Mount Lemmon Survey	·	1.7 km	MPC · JPL
559031	2015 BF_{378}	—	April 21, 2012	Mount Lemmon	Mount Lemmon Survey	·	1.8 km	MPC · JPL
559032	2015 BK_{378}	—	November 21, 2003	Kitt Peak	Deep Ecliptic Survey	EOS	1.8 km	MPC · JPL
559033	2015 BK_{379}	—	June 8, 2012	Mount Lemmon	Mount Lemmon Survey	·	2.0 km	MPC · JPL
559034	2015 BX_{381}	—	October 26, 2013	Catalina	CSS	·	2.3 km	MPC · JPL
559035	2015 BR_{385}	—	June 15, 2012	Kitt Peak	Spacewatch	·	2.7 km	MPC · JPL
559036	2015 BE_{388}	—	December 18, 2009	Mount Lemmon	Mount Lemmon Survey	AGN	1.1 km	MPC · JPL
559037	2015 BD_{390}	—	October 24, 2013	Mount Lemmon	Mount Lemmon Survey	·	2.3 km	MPC · JPL
559038	2015 BS_{390}	—	January 20, 2015	Haleakala	Pan-STARRS 1	·	1.7 km	MPC · JPL
559039	2015 BT_{390}	—	October 6, 2008	Kitt Peak	Spacewatch	KOR	1.3 km	MPC · JPL
559040	2015 BV_{390}	—	January 20, 2015	Haleakala	Pan-STARRS 1	·	1.5 km	MPC · JPL
559041	2015 BM_{391}	—	January 19, 2004	Kitt Peak	Spacewatch	THM	2.2 km	MPC · JPL
559042	2015 BL_{394}	—	November 27, 2009	Kitt Peak	Spacewatch	·	2.7 km	MPC · JPL
559043	2015 BP_{394}	—	October 5, 2013	Haleakala	Pan-STARRS 1	EMA	2.6 km	MPC · JPL
559044	2015 BP_{397}	—	October 3, 2013	Haleakala	Pan-STARRS 1	·	1.4 km	MPC · JPL
559045	2015 BE_{398}	—	October 24, 2013	Mount Lemmon	Mount Lemmon Survey	KOR	1.0 km	MPC · JPL
559046	2015 BT_{398}	—	December 3, 2005	Mauna Kea	A. Boattini	·	2.1 km	MPC · JPL
559047	2015 BU_{398}	—	January 20, 2015	Kitt Peak	Spacewatch	EOS	1.5 km	MPC · JPL
559048	2015 BF_{401}	—	January 11, 2010	Kitt Peak	Spacewatch	KOR	1.0 km	MPC · JPL
559049	2015 BP_{402}	—	December 22, 2008	Mount Lemmon	Mount Lemmon Survey	·	1.7 km	MPC · JPL
559050	2015 BV_{403}	—	September 21, 2007	Kitt Peak	Spacewatch	·	2.7 km	MPC · JPL
559051	2015 BY_{403}	—	January 20, 2015	Haleakala	Pan-STARRS 1	·	2.4 km	MPC · JPL
559052	2015 BN_{405}	—	November 6, 2013	Haleakala	Pan-STARRS 1	·	2.7 km	MPC · JPL
559053	2015 BO_{405}	—	August 13, 2006	Palomar	NEAT	·	3.4 km	MPC · JPL
559054	2015 BN_{407}	—	September 22, 2008	Kitt Peak	Spacewatch	KOR	1.2 km	MPC · JPL
559055	2015 BW_{407}	—	January 20, 2015	Haleakala	Pan-STARRS 1	KOR	1.1 km	MPC · JPL
559056	2015 BH_{409}	—	March 11, 2005	Kitt Peak	Spacewatch	·	2.4 km	MPC · JPL
559057	2015 BQ_{409}	—	August 26, 2012	Haleakala	Pan-STARRS 1	·	1.7 km	MPC · JPL
559058	2015 BR_{409}	—	October 6, 2008	Kitt Peak	Spacewatch	KOR	1.2 km	MPC · JPL
559059	2015 BD_{410}	—	January 20, 2015	Haleakala	Pan-STARRS 1	EOS	1.7 km	MPC · JPL
559060	2015 BM_{410}	—	January 20, 2015	Haleakala	Pan-STARRS 1	·	1.7 km	MPC · JPL
559061	2015 BE_{411}	—	December 30, 2008	Mount Lemmon	Mount Lemmon Survey	·	3.3 km	MPC · JPL
559062	2015 BS_{411}	—	August 14, 2012	Haleakala	Pan-STARRS 1	·	2.1 km	MPC · JPL
559063	2015 BC_{412}	—	November 11, 2013	Mount Lemmon	Mount Lemmon Survey	EOS	1.6 km	MPC · JPL
559064	2015 BV_{412}	—	December 31, 2008	Kitt Peak	Spacewatch	·	2.1 km	MPC · JPL
559065	2015 BY_{412}	—	August 25, 2012	Mount Lemmon	Mount Lemmon Survey	·	1.8 km	MPC · JPL
559066	2015 BD_{413}	—	September 15, 2013	Mount Lemmon	Mount Lemmon Survey	·	2.2 km	MPC · JPL
559067	2015 BW_{415}	—	May 26, 2011	Mount Lemmon	Mount Lemmon Survey	·	1.7 km	MPC · JPL
559068	2015 BC_{416}	—	October 17, 2012	Haleakala	Pan-STARRS 1	3:2	4.3 km	MPC · JPL
559069	2015 BE_{417}	—	November 19, 2003	Kitt Peak	Spacewatch	·	1.8 km	MPC · JPL
559070	2015 BT_{417}	—	January 20, 2015	Haleakala	Pan-STARRS 1	·	1.9 km	MPC · JPL
559071	2015 BA_{418}	—	December 7, 2013	Kitt Peak	Spacewatch	·	2.9 km	MPC · JPL
559072	2015 BQ_{418}	—	October 28, 2013	Mount Lemmon	Mount Lemmon Survey	·	2.5 km	MPC · JPL
559073	2015 BD_{419}	—	September 14, 2013	Haleakala	Pan-STARRS 1	·	1.8 km	MPC · JPL
559074	2015 BS_{419}	—	September 10, 2007	Mount Lemmon	Mount Lemmon Survey	HYG	2.2 km	MPC · JPL
559075	2015 BS_{421}	—	January 20, 2015	Haleakala	Pan-STARRS 1	·	2.2 km	MPC · JPL
559076	2015 BG_{422}	—	January 20, 2015	Haleakala	Pan-STARRS 1	·	2.6 km	MPC · JPL
559077	2015 BL_{422}	—	August 10, 2007	Kitt Peak	Spacewatch	·	1.4 km	MPC · JPL
559078	2015 BL_{425}	—	February 26, 2004	Kitt Peak	Deep Ecliptic Survey	EOS	1.5 km	MPC · JPL
559079	2015 BZ_{425}	—	January 20, 2015	Kitt Peak	Spacewatch	·	3.2 km	MPC · JPL
559080	2015 BN_{427}	—	January 20, 2015	Haleakala	Pan-STARRS 1	·	1.7 km	MPC · JPL
559081	2015 BN_{428}	—	October 8, 2012	Mount Lemmon	Mount Lemmon Survey	THM	2.1 km	MPC · JPL
559082	2015 BY_{430}	—	November 27, 2013	Haleakala	Pan-STARRS 1	·	1.5 km	MPC · JPL
559083	2015 BC_{431}	—	March 12, 2010	Mount Lemmon	Mount Lemmon Survey	·	2.7 km	MPC · JPL
559084	2015 BP_{431}	—	January 20, 2015	Haleakala	Pan-STARRS 1	(31811)	2.4 km	MPC · JPL
559085	2015 BW_{431}	—	January 20, 2015	Haleakala	Pan-STARRS 1	·	2.2 km	MPC · JPL
559086	2015 BG_{432}	—	March 19, 2010	Mount Lemmon	Mount Lemmon Survey	EOS	1.9 km	MPC · JPL
559087	2015 BG_{433}	—	January 20, 2015	Haleakala	Pan-STARRS 1	·	2.8 km	MPC · JPL
559088	2015 BK_{433}	—	January 20, 2015	Haleakala	Pan-STARRS 1	·	2.2 km	MPC · JPL
559089	2015 BT_{434}	—	January 20, 2015	Haleakala	Pan-STARRS 1	EOS	1.7 km	MPC · JPL
559090	2015 BU_{434}	—	December 29, 2008	Mount Lemmon	Mount Lemmon Survey	HYG	2.3 km	MPC · JPL
559091	2015 BB_{435}	—	January 20, 2015	Haleakala	Pan-STARRS 1	·	2.5 km	MPC · JPL
559092	2015 BG_{435}	—	October 10, 2002	Kitt Peak	Spacewatch	THM	2.0 km	MPC · JPL
559093	2015 BZ_{435}	—	January 20, 2015	Haleakala	Pan-STARRS 1	EOS	1.4 km	MPC · JPL
559094	2015 BB_{437}	—	September 12, 2007	Kitt Peak	Spacewatch	·	1.8 km	MPC · JPL
559095	2015 BQ_{437}	—	September 12, 2007	Mount Lemmon	Mount Lemmon Survey	THM	2.2 km	MPC · JPL
559096	2015 BU_{437}	—	January 20, 2015	Haleakala	Pan-STARRS 1	EOS	1.5 km	MPC · JPL
559097	2015 BX_{439}	—	September 12, 2007	Mount Lemmon	Mount Lemmon Survey	·	1.7 km	MPC · JPL
559098	2015 BX_{440}	—	January 20, 2015	Haleakala	Pan-STARRS 1	EOS	1.6 km	MPC · JPL
559099	2015 BQ_{442}	—	January 20, 2015	Haleakala	Pan-STARRS 1	·	2.0 km	MPC · JPL
559100	2015 BA_{443}	—	June 6, 2011	Mount Lemmon	Mount Lemmon Survey	·	2.7 km	MPC · JPL

== 559101–559200 ==
back to top

Designation			Discovery			Properties		Ref
Permanent	Provisional	Named after	Date	Site	Discoverer(s)	Category	Diam.	Ref
559101	2015 BL_{444}	—	December 27, 2013	Mount Lemmon	Mount Lemmon Survey	·	1.9 km	MPC · JPL
559102	2015 BZ_{444}	—	January 20, 2015	Haleakala	Pan-STARRS 1	·	2.7 km	MPC · JPL
559103	2015 BM_{445}	—	November 11, 2013	Mount Lemmon	Mount Lemmon Survey	EMA	2.4 km	MPC · JPL
559104	2015 BM_{446}	—	February 16, 2004	Kitt Peak	Spacewatch	·	3.1 km	MPC · JPL
559105	2015 BR_{447}	—	September 12, 2007	Mount Lemmon	Mount Lemmon Survey	·	2.3 km	MPC · JPL
559106	2015 BO_{449}	—	January 20, 2015	Haleakala	Pan-STARRS 1	EOS	1.5 km	MPC · JPL
559107	2015 BR_{449}	—	July 27, 2001	Anderson Mesa	LONEOS	·	1.8 km	MPC · JPL
559108	2015 BB_{450}	—	January 20, 2015	Haleakala	Pan-STARRS 1	EOS	1.5 km	MPC · JPL
559109	2015 BZ_{450}	—	September 4, 2007	Mount Lemmon	Mount Lemmon Survey	·	1.6 km	MPC · JPL
559110	2015 BD_{451}	—	October 9, 2012	Mount Lemmon	Mount Lemmon Survey	(43176)	2.5 km	MPC · JPL
559111	2015 BP_{453}	—	October 19, 2006	Kitt Peak	Deep Ecliptic Survey	THM	2.0 km	MPC · JPL
559112	2015 BV_{453}	—	January 20, 2015	Haleakala	Pan-STARRS 1	·	2.4 km	MPC · JPL
559113	2015 BW_{453}	—	January 20, 2015	Haleakala	Pan-STARRS 1	·	2.6 km	MPC · JPL
559114	2015 BE_{455}	—	January 20, 2015	Haleakala	Pan-STARRS 1	·	1.4 km	MPC · JPL
559115	2015 BR_{455}	—	January 20, 2015	Haleakala	Pan-STARRS 1	·	2.2 km	MPC · JPL
559116	2015 BU_{455}	—	September 28, 2003	Kitt Peak	Spacewatch	KOR	1.4 km	MPC · JPL
559117	2015 BW_{456}	—	December 3, 2013	Haleakala	Pan-STARRS 1	·	1.5 km	MPC · JPL
559118	2015 BG_{457}	—	March 11, 2005	Mount Lemmon	Mount Lemmon Survey	·	1.6 km	MPC · JPL
559119	2015 BN_{457}	—	October 1, 2013	Kitt Peak	Spacewatch	·	1.4 km	MPC · JPL
559120	2015 BU_{457}	—	January 20, 2015	Haleakala	Pan-STARRS 1	EOS	2.0 km	MPC · JPL
559121	2015 BB_{458}	—	January 20, 2015	Haleakala	Pan-STARRS 1	EOS	1.2 km	MPC · JPL
559122	2015 BN_{459}	—	January 20, 2015	Haleakala	Pan-STARRS 1	·	2.2 km	MPC · JPL
559123	2015 BJ_{460}	—	November 19, 2008	Kitt Peak	Spacewatch	THM	2.5 km	MPC · JPL
559124	2015 BN_{460}	—	September 22, 2012	Mount Lemmon	Mount Lemmon Survey	·	1.8 km	MPC · JPL
559125	2015 BD_{461}	—	March 18, 2010	Mount Lemmon	Mount Lemmon Survey	·	1.8 km	MPC · JPL
559126	2015 BL_{461}	—	April 30, 2011	Mount Lemmon	Mount Lemmon Survey	·	2.3 km	MPC · JPL
559127	2015 BO_{461}	—	January 20, 2015	Haleakala	Pan-STARRS 1	·	1.5 km	MPC · JPL
559128	2015 BZ_{462}	—	October 27, 2013	Kitt Peak	Spacewatch	·	2.4 km	MPC · JPL
559129	2015 BL_{463}	—	March 27, 2011	Mount Lemmon	Mount Lemmon Survey	AGN	1.1 km	MPC · JPL
559130	2015 BE_{465}	—	November 2, 2013	Mount Lemmon	Mount Lemmon Survey	·	2.0 km	MPC · JPL
559131	2015 BE_{466}	—	January 20, 2015	Haleakala	Pan-STARRS 1	·	1.6 km	MPC · JPL
559132	2015 BG_{466}	—	November 29, 2013	Mount Lemmon	Mount Lemmon Survey	·	2.8 km	MPC · JPL
559133	2015 BN_{467}	—	January 7, 1994	Kitt Peak	Spacewatch	·	1.5 km	MPC · JPL
559134	2015 BZ_{471}	—	November 1, 2013	Mount Lemmon	Mount Lemmon Survey	·	1.3 km	MPC · JPL
559135 Richardgreaves	2015 BB_{474}	Richardgreaves	March 1, 2011	Mayhill	Falla, N.	·	2.1 km	MPC · JPL
559136	2015 BL_{474}	—	December 3, 2005	Mauna Kea	A. Boattini	KOR	1.1 km	MPC · JPL
559137	2015 BT_{475}	—	October 27, 2008	Mount Lemmon	Mount Lemmon Survey	·	1.3 km	MPC · JPL
559138	2015 BZ_{475}	—	September 25, 2008	Kitt Peak	Spacewatch	·	1.5 km	MPC · JPL
559139	2015 BN_{477}	—	April 16, 2005	Kitt Peak	Spacewatch	·	1.8 km	MPC · JPL
559140	2015 BR_{480}	—	August 17, 2012	ESA OGS	ESA OGS	·	2.6 km	MPC · JPL
559141	2015 BD_{482}	—	September 10, 2007	Mount Lemmon	Mount Lemmon Survey	·	2.2 km	MPC · JPL
559142	2015 BK_{482}	—	October 10, 2012	Mount Lemmon	Mount Lemmon Survey	LIX	3.6 km	MPC · JPL
559143	2015 BN_{482}	—	October 28, 2013	Mount Lemmon	Mount Lemmon Survey	EOS	1.4 km	MPC · JPL
559144	2015 BN_{483}	—	October 8, 2008	Kitt Peak	Spacewatch	·	1.4 km	MPC · JPL
559145	2015 BO_{483}	—	October 23, 2013	Mount Lemmon	Mount Lemmon Survey	KOR	1.0 km	MPC · JPL
559146	2015 BQ_{484}	—	March 15, 2010	Mount Lemmon	Mount Lemmon Survey	·	1.7 km	MPC · JPL
559147	2015 BZ_{486}	—	September 22, 2012	Mount Lemmon	Mount Lemmon Survey	·	2.5 km	MPC · JPL
559148	2015 BY_{487}	—	January 20, 2015	Haleakala	Pan-STARRS 1	·	2.2 km	MPC · JPL
559149	2015 BJ_{488}	—	November 10, 2013	Mount Lemmon	Mount Lemmon Survey	·	2.8 km	MPC · JPL
559150	2015 BU_{488}	—	December 3, 2013	Haleakala	Pan-STARRS 1	·	2.5 km	MPC · JPL
559151	2015 BC_{489}	—	March 18, 2010	Mount Lemmon	Mount Lemmon Survey	HYG	2.1 km	MPC · JPL
559152	2015 BH_{489}	—	January 20, 2015	Haleakala	Pan-STARRS 1	VER	2.0 km	MPC · JPL
559153	2015 BM_{489}	—	October 9, 2013	Mount Lemmon	Mount Lemmon Survey	·	2.0 km	MPC · JPL
559154	2015 BV_{489}	—	January 20, 2015	Haleakala	Pan-STARRS 1	·	2.4 km	MPC · JPL
559155	2015 BM_{490}	—	January 20, 2015	Haleakala	Pan-STARRS 1	·	1.5 km	MPC · JPL
559156	2015 BL_{491}	—	August 24, 2007	Kitt Peak	Spacewatch	·	2.1 km	MPC · JPL
559157	2015 BP_{491}	—	October 8, 2007	Mount Lemmon	Mount Lemmon Survey	·	1.8 km	MPC · JPL
559158	2015 BU_{491}	—	January 20, 2015	Haleakala	Pan-STARRS 1	EOS	1.4 km	MPC · JPL
559159	2015 BE_{492}	—	October 9, 2013	Oukaïmeden	M. Ory	EOS	1.6 km	MPC · JPL
559160	2015 BF_{494}	—	October 2, 2008	Mount Lemmon	Mount Lemmon Survey	·	1.6 km	MPC · JPL
559161	2015 BH_{494}	—	February 14, 2010	Kitt Peak	Spacewatch	EOS	1.6 km	MPC · JPL
559162	2015 BK_{495}	—	August 16, 2001	Palomar	NEAT	T_{j} (2.96)	3.4 km	MPC · JPL
559163	2015 BW_{495}	—	November 27, 2013	Haleakala	Pan-STARRS 1	·	1.9 km	MPC · JPL
559164	2015 BV_{496}	—	January 20, 2015	Haleakala	Pan-STARRS 1	·	2.1 km	MPC · JPL
559165	2015 BA_{498}	—	January 20, 2015	Haleakala	Pan-STARRS 1	·	1.5 km	MPC · JPL
559166	2015 BG_{498}	—	November 20, 2008	Mount Lemmon	Mount Lemmon Survey	KOR	1.4 km	MPC · JPL
559167	2015 BY_{502}	—	September 23, 2008	Mount Lemmon	Mount Lemmon Survey	·	1.6 km	MPC · JPL
559168	2015 BQ_{503}	—	January 20, 2015	Haleakala	Pan-STARRS 1	EOS	1.6 km	MPC · JPL
559169	2015 BB_{504}	—	October 8, 2008	Mount Lemmon	Mount Lemmon Survey	·	1.4 km	MPC · JPL
559170	2015 BT_{505}	—	September 12, 2007	Mount Lemmon	Mount Lemmon Survey	·	1.6 km	MPC · JPL
559171	2015 BN_{510}	—	January 15, 2015	Mount Lemmon	Mount Lemmon Survey	·	860 m	MPC · JPL
559172	2015 BC_{512}	—	January 17, 2004	Kitt Peak	Spacewatch	·	3.6 km	MPC · JPL
559173	2015 BE_{512}	—	November 17, 1999	Kitt Peak	Spacewatch	·	2.4 km	MPC · JPL
559174	2015 BF_{513}	—	November 9, 2008	Mount Lemmon	Mount Lemmon Survey	·	2.4 km	MPC · JPL
559175	2015 BR_{513}	—	December 20, 2014	Haleakala	Pan-STARRS 1	H	620 m	MPC · JPL
559176	2015 BE_{518}	—	January 27, 2015	Haleakala	Pan-STARRS 1	centaur	113 km	MPC · JPL
559177	2015 BF_{518}	—	January 19, 2015	Haleakala	Pan-STARRS 1	centaur	60 km	MPC · JPL
559178	2015 BM_{518}	—	January 23, 2015	Haleakala	Pan-STARRS 1	res · 3:4	195 km	MPC · JPL
559179	2015 BR_{518}	—	January 27, 2015	Haleakala	Pan-STARRS 1	res · 4:7	179 km	MPC · JPL
559180	2015 BT_{518}	—	January 28, 2015	Haleakala	Pan-STARRS 1	cubewano (hot)	315 km	MPC · JPL
559181	2015 BX_{518}	—	January 18, 2015	Haleakala	Pan-STARRS 1	cubewano (hot)	379 km	MPC · JPL
559182	2015 BZ_{518}	—	January 24, 2015	Haleakala	Pan-STARRS 1	cubewano (hot)	540 km	MPC · JPL
559183	2015 BW_{519}	—	January 15, 2015	Haleakala	Pan-STARRS 1	H	560 m	MPC · JPL
559184	2015 BT_{520}	—	January 23, 2015	Haleakala	Pan-STARRS 1	H	440 m	MPC · JPL
559185	2015 BD_{521}	—	January 18, 2015	Mount Lemmon	Mount Lemmon Survey	H	440 m	MPC · JPL
559186	2015 BT_{527}	—	January 19, 2015	Mount Lemmon	Mount Lemmon Survey	H	440 m	MPC · JPL
559187	2015 BA_{529}	—	January 16, 2015	Haleakala	Pan-STARRS 1	EOS	1.7 km	MPC · JPL
559188	2015 BU_{529}	—	January 18, 2015	Haleakala	Pan-STARRS 1	·	3.4 km	MPC · JPL
559189	2015 BZ_{529}	—	January 20, 2015	Haleakala	Pan-STARRS 1	·	1.8 km	MPC · JPL
559190	2015 BA_{530}	—	January 20, 2015	Haleakala	Pan-STARRS 1	·	2.0 km	MPC · JPL
559191	2015 BW_{530}	—	January 21, 2015	Haleakala	Pan-STARRS 1	·	2.9 km	MPC · JPL
559192	2015 BD_{531}	—	January 21, 2015	Haleakala	Pan-STARRS 1	·	2.1 km	MPC · JPL
559193	2015 BY_{531}	—	January 23, 2015	Haleakala	Pan-STARRS 1	·	2.6 km	MPC · JPL
559194	2015 BR_{533}	—	September 5, 2002	Socorro	LINEAR	·	2.3 km	MPC · JPL
559195	2015 BJ_{534}	—	April 25, 2006	Kitt Peak	Spacewatch	·	1.9 km	MPC · JPL
559196	2015 BK_{534}	—	October 15, 2002	Palomar	NEAT	EOS	2.5 km	MPC · JPL
559197	2015 BC_{535}	—	January 26, 2015	Haleakala	Pan-STARRS 1	EOS	1.6 km	MPC · JPL
559198	2015 BB_{536}	—	November 13, 2002	Kitt Peak	Spacewatch	TIR	1.9 km	MPC · JPL
559199	2015 BQ_{537}	—	March 18, 2009	Pla D'Arguines	R. Ferrando, Segarra, C.	VER	2.7 km	MPC · JPL
559200	2015 BX_{538}	—	January 17, 2015	Mount Lemmon	Mount Lemmon Survey	·	1.5 km	MPC · JPL

== 559201–559300 ==
back to top

Designation			Discovery			Properties		Ref
Permanent	Provisional	Named after	Date	Site	Discoverer(s)	Category	Diam.	Ref
559201	2015 BM_{539}	—	October 21, 2007	Kitt Peak	Spacewatch	·	2.7 km	MPC · JPL
559202	2015 BP_{539}	—	May 21, 2011	Mount Lemmon	Mount Lemmon Survey	KOR	1.2 km	MPC · JPL
559203	2015 BY_{539}	—	January 22, 2015	Haleakala	Pan-STARRS 1	·	1.9 km	MPC · JPL
559204	2015 BH_{540}	—	September 15, 2007	Kitt Peak	Spacewatch	EOS	1.4 km	MPC · JPL
559205	2015 BA_{541}	—	January 27, 2015	Haleakala	Pan-STARRS 1	·	2.2 km	MPC · JPL
559206	2015 BD_{541}	—	November 16, 2012	Haleakala	Pan-STARRS 1	·	2.2 km	MPC · JPL
559207	2015 BM_{541}	—	September 12, 2007	Mount Lemmon	Mount Lemmon Survey	·	2.3 km	MPC · JPL
559208	2015 BE_{542}	—	January 22, 2015	Haleakala	Pan-STARRS 1	·	3.1 km	MPC · JPL
559209	2015 BY_{542}	—	January 16, 2015	Haleakala	Pan-STARRS 1	·	1.9 km	MPC · JPL
559210	2015 BB_{544}	—	September 24, 2008	Mount Lemmon	Mount Lemmon Survey	EOS	1.6 km	MPC · JPL
559211	2015 BJ_{544}	—	November 12, 2013	Kitt Peak	Spacewatch	·	2.7 km	MPC · JPL
559212	2015 BN_{544}	—	December 22, 2008	Mount Lemmon	Mount Lemmon Survey	·	3.3 km	MPC · JPL
559213	2015 BJ_{545}	—	January 18, 2009	Mount Lemmon	Mount Lemmon Survey	·	2.5 km	MPC · JPL
559214	2015 BR_{545}	—	October 10, 2012	Haleakala	Pan-STARRS 1	ELF	3.2 km	MPC · JPL
559215	2015 BU_{545}	—	January 29, 2009	Mount Lemmon	Mount Lemmon Survey	·	2.4 km	MPC · JPL
559216	2015 BK_{547}	—	January 27, 2015	Haleakala	Pan-STARRS 1	·	2.5 km	MPC · JPL
559217	2015 BC_{548}	—	December 29, 2014	Haleakala	Pan-STARRS 1	·	2.5 km	MPC · JPL
559218	2015 BQ_{550}	—	October 23, 2008	Kitt Peak	Spacewatch	·	1.5 km	MPC · JPL
559219	2015 BE_{552}	—	January 17, 2015	Mount Lemmon	Mount Lemmon Survey	·	2.3 km	MPC · JPL
559220	2015 BW_{552}	—	January 16, 2015	Mount Lemmon	Mount Lemmon Survey	·	2.3 km	MPC · JPL
559221	2015 BA_{555}	—	October 3, 2013	Haleakala	Pan-STARRS 1	·	1.7 km	MPC · JPL
559222	2015 BE_{555}	—	September 14, 2013	Haleakala	Pan-STARRS 1	615	1.2 km	MPC · JPL
559223	2015 BA_{556}	—	February 13, 2004	Kitt Peak	Spacewatch	·	3.1 km	MPC · JPL
559224	2015 BY_{557}	—	December 17, 2009	Kitt Peak	Spacewatch	·	1.7 km	MPC · JPL
559225	2015 BV_{559}	—	January 18, 2015	Mount Lemmon	Mount Lemmon Survey	TRE	2.2 km	MPC · JPL
559226	2015 BC_{560}	—	December 1, 2008	Mount Lemmon	Mount Lemmon Survey	·	1.9 km	MPC · JPL
559227	2015 BE_{560}	—	September 28, 2003	Kitt Peak	Spacewatch	·	1.6 km	MPC · JPL
559228	2015 BV_{561}	—	January 30, 2011	Mount Lemmon	Mount Lemmon Survey	·	1.8 km	MPC · JPL
559229	2015 BO_{562}	—	April 2, 2005	Kitt Peak	Spacewatch	·	2.2 km	MPC · JPL
559230	2015 BG_{564}	—	August 26, 2012	Haleakala	Pan-STARRS 1	·	1.4 km	MPC · JPL
559231	2015 BF_{565}	—	January 1, 2009	Mount Lemmon	Mount Lemmon Survey	·	2.5 km	MPC · JPL
559232	2015 BA_{566}	—	January 16, 2015	Haleakala	Pan-STARRS 1	·	2.5 km	MPC · JPL
559233	2015 BW_{566}	—	January 7, 2010	Mount Lemmon	Mount Lemmon Survey	·	2.0 km	MPC · JPL
559234	2015 BX_{566}	—	March 30, 2000	Kitt Peak	Spacewatch	EOS	1.9 km	MPC · JPL
559235	2015 BA_{567}	—	September 12, 2013	Mount Lemmon	Mount Lemmon Survey	·	1.7 km	MPC · JPL
559236	2015 BL_{567}	—	January 30, 2004	Kitt Peak	Spacewatch	EOS	2.0 km	MPC · JPL
559237	2015 BU_{567}	—	January 3, 2009	Kitt Peak	Spacewatch	·	2.8 km	MPC · JPL
559238	2015 BX_{567}	—	September 29, 2008	Mount Lemmon	Mount Lemmon Survey	·	1.7 km	MPC · JPL
559239	2015 BF_{568}	—	January 19, 2015	Haleakala	Pan-STARRS 1	centaur	60 km	MPC · JPL
559240	2015 BE_{571}	—	January 21, 2015	Haleakala	Pan-STARRS 1	·	2.0 km	MPC · JPL
559241	2015 BV_{571}	—	January 29, 2015	Haleakala	Pan-STARRS 1	·	2.3 km	MPC · JPL
559242	2015 BX_{573}	—	January 20, 2015	Haleakala	Pan-STARRS 1	·	2.3 km	MPC · JPL
559243	2015 BJ_{576}	—	March 31, 2016	Haleakala	Pan-STARRS 1	·	1.9 km	MPC · JPL
559244	2015 BO_{583}	—	March 5, 2016	Haleakala	Pan-STARRS 1	·	1.5 km	MPC · JPL
559245	2015 BQ_{583}	—	January 20, 2015	Haleakala	Pan-STARRS 1	EOS	1.6 km	MPC · JPL
559246	2015 BU_{585}	—	January 18, 2015	Mount Lemmon	Mount Lemmon Survey	BRA	1.4 km	MPC · JPL
559247	2015 BE_{587}	—	January 21, 2015	Haleakala	Pan-STARRS 1	·	2.1 km	MPC · JPL
559248	2015 BH_{587}	—	January 22, 2015	Haleakala	Pan-STARRS 1	·	2.2 km	MPC · JPL
559249	2015 BJ_{587}	—	January 20, 2015	Mount Lemmon	Mount Lemmon Survey	·	2.7 km	MPC · JPL
559250	2015 BK_{587}	—	January 18, 2015	Kitt Peak	Spacewatch	EOS	1.4 km	MPC · JPL
559251	2015 BM_{587}	—	January 19, 2015	Haleakala	Pan-STARRS 1	EOS	1.5 km	MPC · JPL
559252	2015 BU_{587}	—	January 18, 2015	Mount Lemmon	Mount Lemmon Survey	·	1.9 km	MPC · JPL
559253	2015 BC_{590}	—	January 28, 2015	Haleakala	Pan-STARRS 1	·	2.6 km	MPC · JPL
559254	2015 BJ_{590}	—	January 27, 2015	Haleakala	Pan-STARRS 1	·	1.9 km	MPC · JPL
559255	2015 BK_{590}	—	January 20, 2015	Haleakala	Pan-STARRS 1	EOS	1.2 km	MPC · JPL
559256	2015 BP_{590}	—	January 27, 2015	Haleakala	Pan-STARRS 1	·	2.6 km	MPC · JPL
559257	2015 BW_{590}	—	January 18, 2015	Haleakala	Pan-STARRS 1	EOS	1.3 km	MPC · JPL
559258	2015 BZ_{590}	—	January 17, 2015	Haleakala	Pan-STARRS 1	TIR	2.6 km	MPC · JPL
559259	2015 BA_{591}	—	January 22, 2015	Haleakala	Pan-STARRS 1	VER	2.3 km	MPC · JPL
559260	2015 BE_{591}	—	January 17, 2015	Haleakala	Pan-STARRS 1	·	1.5 km	MPC · JPL
559261	2015 BF_{591}	—	October 26, 2008	Mount Lemmon	Mount Lemmon Survey	·	1.5 km	MPC · JPL
559262	2015 BJ_{591}	—	January 20, 2015	Mount Lemmon	Mount Lemmon Survey	EOS	1.4 km	MPC · JPL
559263	2015 BK_{591}	—	January 22, 2015	Haleakala	Pan-STARRS 1	·	1.6 km	MPC · JPL
559264	2015 BQ_{591}	—	January 21, 2015	Haleakala	Pan-STARRS 1	·	1.4 km	MPC · JPL
559265	2015 BL_{593}	—	January 23, 2015	Haleakala	Pan-STARRS 1	EOS	1.6 km	MPC · JPL
559266	2015 BM_{593}	—	January 26, 2015	Haleakala	Pan-STARRS 1	·	1.3 km	MPC · JPL
559267	2015 BO_{593}	—	January 19, 2015	Mount Lemmon	Mount Lemmon Survey	·	2.0 km	MPC · JPL
559268	2015 BR_{593}	—	October 20, 2003	Kitt Peak	Spacewatch	·	1.8 km	MPC · JPL
559269	2015 BT_{593}	—	January 17, 2015	Haleakala	Pan-STARRS 1	EOS	1.5 km	MPC · JPL
559270	2015 BU_{593}	—	January 28, 2004	Kitt Peak	Spacewatch	·	2.1 km	MPC · JPL
559271	2015 BX_{593}	—	January 16, 2015	Haleakala	Pan-STARRS 1	·	2.4 km	MPC · JPL
559272	2015 BY_{593}	—	October 10, 2012	Mount Lemmon	Mount Lemmon Survey	·	2.4 km	MPC · JPL
559273	2015 BZ_{593}	—	January 28, 2015	Haleakala	Pan-STARRS 1	·	2.5 km	MPC · JPL
559274	2015 BA_{594}	—	January 27, 2015	Haleakala	Pan-STARRS 1	·	2.8 km	MPC · JPL
559275	2015 BB_{594}	—	January 28, 2015	Haleakala	Pan-STARRS 1	·	2.8 km	MPC · JPL
559276	2015 BC_{594}	—	January 18, 2015	Haleakala	Pan-STARRS 1	EOS	1.5 km	MPC · JPL
559277	2015 BY_{594}	—	January 17, 2015	Haleakala	Pan-STARRS 1	·	1.8 km	MPC · JPL
559278	2015 BB_{595}	—	January 21, 2015	Haleakala	Pan-STARRS 1	·	2.4 km	MPC · JPL
559279	2015 BC_{595}	—	January 17, 2015	Haleakala	Pan-STARRS 1	·	1.7 km	MPC · JPL
559280	2015 BR_{595}	—	January 20, 2015	Mount Lemmon	Mount Lemmon Survey	EOS	1.5 km	MPC · JPL
559281	2015 BB_{596}	—	January 18, 2015	Mount Lemmon	Mount Lemmon Survey	·	2.2 km	MPC · JPL
559282	2015 BJ_{596}	—	January 17, 2015	Mount Lemmon	Mount Lemmon Survey	·	2.0 km	MPC · JPL
559283	2015 BM_{598}	—	January 20, 2015	Haleakala	Pan-STARRS 1	·	1.5 km	MPC · JPL
559284	2015 BN_{601}	—	January 27, 2015	Haleakala	Pan-STARRS 1	·	1.7 km	MPC · JPL
559285	2015 BS_{601}	—	January 28, 2015	Haleakala	Pan-STARRS 1	EOS	1.6 km	MPC · JPL
559286	2015 BT_{602}	—	January 26, 2015	Haleakala	Pan-STARRS 1	·	2.4 km	MPC · JPL
559287	2015 BT_{606}	—	January 27, 2015	Haleakala	Pan-STARRS 1	·	2.5 km	MPC · JPL
559288	2015 BU_{606}	—	January 28, 2015	Haleakala	Pan-STARRS 1	·	2.7 km	MPC · JPL
559289	2015 BC_{607}	—	January 22, 2015	Haleakala	Pan-STARRS 1	·	1.9 km	MPC · JPL
559290	2015 BG_{607}	—	January 17, 2015	Haleakala	Pan-STARRS 1	EOS	1.7 km	MPC · JPL
559291	2015 BM_{608}	—	January 28, 2015	Haleakala	Pan-STARRS 1	EOS	1.6 km	MPC · JPL
559292	2015 BU_{615}	—	January 28, 2015	Haleakala	Pan-STARRS 1	L4	6.7 km	MPC · JPL
559293	2015 CK	—	June 8, 2003	Kitt Peak	Spacewatch	H	520 m	MPC · JPL
559294	2015 CY	—	April 24, 2007	Mount Lemmon	Mount Lemmon Survey	·	1.0 km	MPC · JPL
559295	2015 CR_{1}	—	February 17, 2010	Kitt Peak	Spacewatch	·	2.0 km	MPC · JPL
559296	2015 CZ_{1}	—	February 14, 2004	Kitt Peak	Spacewatch	·	2.0 km	MPC · JPL
559297	2015 CH_{2}	—	October 26, 2008	Kitt Peak	Spacewatch	·	2.0 km	MPC · JPL
559298	2015 CK_{2}	—	February 16, 2004	Kitt Peak	Spacewatch	·	2.3 km	MPC · JPL
559299	2015 CV_{2}	—	January 16, 2015	Haleakala	Pan-STARRS 1	·	1.9 km	MPC · JPL
559300	2015 CB_{3}	—	September 14, 2013	Haleakala	Pan-STARRS 1	·	2.5 km	MPC · JPL

== 559301–559400 ==
back to top

Designation			Discovery			Properties		Ref
Permanent	Provisional	Named after	Date	Site	Discoverer(s)	Category	Diam.	Ref
559301	2015 CF_{3}	—	January 20, 2015	Haleakala	Pan-STARRS 1	·	1.4 km	MPC · JPL
559302	2015 CR_{3}	—	February 6, 2007	Kitt Peak	Spacewatch	H	440 m	MPC · JPL
559303	2015 CW_{3}	—	January 30, 2004	Kitt Peak	Spacewatch	·	3.8 km	MPC · JPL
559304	2015 CA_{4}	—	October 26, 2008	Mount Lemmon	Mount Lemmon Survey	·	2.0 km	MPC · JPL
559305	2015 CM_{4}	—	January 17, 2015	Haleakala	Pan-STARRS 1	EOS	1.5 km	MPC · JPL
559306	2015 CT_{4}	—	November 3, 2003	Apache Point	SDSS Collaboration	·	2.4 km	MPC · JPL
559307	2015 CU_{5}	—	January 16, 2015	Haleakala	Pan-STARRS 1	·	3.3 km	MPC · JPL
559308	2015 CH_{6}	—	January 19, 2015	Mount Lemmon	Mount Lemmon Survey	·	3.0 km	MPC · JPL
559309	2015 CO_{6}	—	April 26, 2010	Mount Lemmon	Mount Lemmon Survey	·	1.6 km	MPC · JPL
559310	2015 CU_{6}	—	January 16, 2004	Kitt Peak	Spacewatch	·	1.8 km	MPC · JPL
559311	2015 CZ_{6}	—	January 20, 2015	Haleakala	Pan-STARRS 1	·	1.7 km	MPC · JPL
559312	2015 CD_{7}	—	November 2, 2013	Mount Lemmon	Mount Lemmon Survey	·	2.9 km	MPC · JPL
559313	2015 CF_{8}	—	October 24, 2013	Mount Lemmon	Mount Lemmon Survey	·	1.3 km	MPC · JPL
559314	2015 CP_{8}	—	February 11, 2004	Kitt Peak	Spacewatch	·	3.9 km	MPC · JPL
559315	2015 CM_{9}	—	December 4, 2008	Kitt Peak	Spacewatch	·	1.7 km	MPC · JPL
559316	2015 CL_{10}	—	February 9, 2015	Mount Lemmon	Mount Lemmon Survey	·	2.7 km	MPC · JPL
559317	2015 CY_{10}	—	August 26, 2012	Haleakala	Pan-STARRS 1	VER	2.7 km	MPC · JPL
559318	2015 CF_{11}	—	January 17, 2004	Palomar	NEAT	·	2.9 km	MPC · JPL
559319	2015 CR_{11}	—	January 21, 2015	Haleakala	Pan-STARRS 1	EOS	2.0 km	MPC · JPL
559320	2015 CX_{11}	—	September 11, 2007	Lulin	LUSS	EOS	2.0 km	MPC · JPL
559321	2015 CC_{12}	—	September 19, 2001	Kitt Peak	Spacewatch	·	3.2 km	MPC · JPL
559322	2015 CP_{14}	—	November 26, 2014	Haleakala	Pan-STARRS 1	EOS	1.9 km	MPC · JPL
559323	2015 CU_{14}	—	January 17, 2015	Haleakala	Pan-STARRS 1	·	2.5 km	MPC · JPL
559324	2015 CX_{14}	—	September 16, 2013	Mount Lemmon	Mount Lemmon Survey	URS	3.0 km	MPC · JPL
559325	2015 CJ_{15}	—	January 19, 2004	Kitt Peak	Spacewatch	·	2.4 km	MPC · JPL
559326	2015 CU_{15}	—	January 21, 2015	Kitt Peak	Spacewatch	EOS	1.7 km	MPC · JPL
559327	2015 CD_{16}	—	January 20, 2015	Kitt Peak	Spacewatch	·	1.7 km	MPC · JPL
559328	2015 CN_{17}	—	November 1, 2013	Mount Lemmon	Mount Lemmon Survey	·	1.5 km	MPC · JPL
559329	2015 CG_{18}	—	January 16, 2004	Kitt Peak	Spacewatch	EOS	2.1 km	MPC · JPL
559330	2015 CL_{18}	—	August 25, 2012	Kitt Peak	Spacewatch	·	2.6 km	MPC · JPL
559331	2015 CM_{18}	—	September 4, 2008	Kitt Peak	Spacewatch	·	1.7 km	MPC · JPL
559332	2015 CS_{18}	—	September 16, 2012	Mount Lemmon	Mount Lemmon Survey	EOS	1.8 km	MPC · JPL
559333	2015 CP_{19}	—	January 18, 2015	Mount Lemmon	Mount Lemmon Survey	·	2.0 km	MPC · JPL
559334	2015 CS_{19}	—	December 4, 2008	Kitt Peak	Spacewatch	·	2.7 km	MPC · JPL
559335	2015 CT_{19}	—	March 18, 2010	Mount Lemmon	Mount Lemmon Survey	·	3.0 km	MPC · JPL
559336	2015 CV_{20}	—	November 12, 2013	Kitt Peak	Spacewatch	THM	2.1 km	MPC · JPL
559337	2015 CE_{22}	—	January 19, 2015	Kitt Peak	Spacewatch	·	1.6 km	MPC · JPL
559338	2015 CM_{22}	—	November 2, 2008	Mount Lemmon	Mount Lemmon Survey	·	1.6 km	MPC · JPL
559339	2015 CP_{22}	—	January 20, 2015	Haleakala	Pan-STARRS 1	·	2.6 km	MPC · JPL
559340	2015 CT_{22}	—	September 13, 2007	Mount Lemmon	Mount Lemmon Survey	·	2.7 km	MPC · JPL
559341	2015 CY_{22}	—	August 24, 2011	Haleakala	Pan-STARRS 1	TIR	2.4 km	MPC · JPL
559342	2015 CP_{23}	—	November 20, 2008	Kitt Peak	Spacewatch	·	1.8 km	MPC · JPL
559343	2015 CT_{25}	—	January 19, 2015	Mount Lemmon	Mount Lemmon Survey	·	2.9 km	MPC · JPL
559344	2015 CK_{26}	—	February 1, 2009	Mount Lemmon	Mount Lemmon Survey	·	2.5 km	MPC · JPL
559345	2015 CP_{27}	—	August 13, 2012	Haleakala	Pan-STARRS 1	·	2.0 km	MPC · JPL
559346	2015 CV_{28}	—	August 11, 2012	Mayhill-ISON	L. Elenin	EOS	1.6 km	MPC · JPL
559347	2015 CW_{28}	—	September 14, 2007	Catalina	CSS	·	3.0 km	MPC · JPL
559348	2015 CS_{29}	—	February 9, 2010	Kitt Peak	Spacewatch	·	1.5 km	MPC · JPL
559349	2015 CY_{29}	—	February 18, 2010	Mount Lemmon	Mount Lemmon Survey	·	1.5 km	MPC · JPL
559350	2015 CS_{30}	—	November 3, 2008	Kitt Peak	Spacewatch	·	1.3 km	MPC · JPL
559351	2015 CA_{31}	—	November 7, 2005	Mauna Kea	A. Boattini	MRX	980 m	MPC · JPL
559352	2015 CW_{31}	—	June 17, 2012	Mount Lemmon	Mount Lemmon Survey	DOR	2.9 km	MPC · JPL
559353	2015 CC_{32}	—	February 13, 2010	Kitt Peak	Spacewatch	·	3.3 km	MPC · JPL
559354	2015 CT_{32}	—	February 11, 2015	Kitt Peak	Spacewatch	·	3.5 km	MPC · JPL
559355	2015 CM_{33}	—	October 24, 2013	Mount Lemmon	Mount Lemmon Survey	·	2.2 km	MPC · JPL
559356	2015 CZ_{33}	—	March 10, 2011	Kitt Peak	Spacewatch	·	2.0 km	MPC · JPL
559357	2015 CJ_{34}	—	December 18, 2009	Kitt Peak	Spacewatch	·	1.6 km	MPC · JPL
559358	2015 CO_{34}	—	September 26, 2008	Kitt Peak	Spacewatch	·	2.7 km	MPC · JPL
559359	2015 CQ_{34}	—	October 22, 2008	Kitt Peak	Spacewatch	·	2.6 km	MPC · JPL
559360	2015 CQ_{35}	—	February 12, 2015	Haleakala	Pan-STARRS 1	·	1.9 km	MPC · JPL
559361	2015 CT_{35}	—	September 12, 2013	Mount Lemmon	Mount Lemmon Survey	·	3.2 km	MPC · JPL
559362	2015 CZ_{35}	—	February 11, 2004	Palomar	NEAT	·	3.0 km	MPC · JPL
559363	2015 CA_{36}	—	December 25, 2005	Kitt Peak	Spacewatch	·	1.9 km	MPC · JPL
559364	2015 CJ_{36}	—	February 13, 2004	Kitt Peak	Spacewatch	·	3.0 km	MPC · JPL
559365	2015 CK_{36}	—	October 11, 2007	Mount Lemmon	Mount Lemmon Survey	·	3.1 km	MPC · JPL
559366	2015 CW_{36}	—	February 16, 2004	Kitt Peak	Spacewatch	·	3.3 km	MPC · JPL
559367	2015 CO_{37}	—	November 21, 2008	Kitt Peak	Spacewatch	·	3.1 km	MPC · JPL
559368	2015 CP_{37}	—	September 10, 2007	Mount Lemmon	Mount Lemmon Survey	EOS	2.0 km	MPC · JPL
559369	2015 CW_{37}	—	September 29, 2008	Mount Lemmon	Mount Lemmon Survey	EOS	1.8 km	MPC · JPL
559370	2015 CO_{38}	—	April 25, 2006	Kitt Peak	Spacewatch	·	2.6 km	MPC · JPL
559371	2015 CF_{39}	—	February 5, 2002	Anderson Mesa	LONEOS	·	4.3 km	MPC · JPL
559372	2015 CB_{40}	—	February 13, 2005	La Silla	A. Boattini	·	3.2 km	MPC · JPL
559373	2015 CM_{40}	—	December 5, 2008	Kitt Peak	Spacewatch	THM	1.8 km	MPC · JPL
559374	2015 CE_{41}	—	January 8, 2010	Mount Lemmon	Mount Lemmon Survey	·	2.1 km	MPC · JPL
559375	2015 CJ_{41}	—	February 12, 2015	Haleakala	Pan-STARRS 1	·	1.9 km	MPC · JPL
559376	2015 CU_{41}	—	January 17, 2004	Palomar	NEAT	TIR	3.0 km	MPC · JPL
559377	2015 CN_{43}	—	February 13, 2004	Kitt Peak	Spacewatch	·	1.8 km	MPC · JPL
559378	2015 CS_{43}	—	February 15, 2010	Kitt Peak	Spacewatch	EOS	1.9 km	MPC · JPL
559379	2015 CS_{44}	—	October 16, 2013	Mount Lemmon	Mount Lemmon Survey	·	2.3 km	MPC · JPL
559380	2015 CS_{47}	—	January 21, 2015	Haleakala	Pan-STARRS 1	·	2.4 km	MPC · JPL
559381	2015 CK_{48}	—	March 12, 2004	Palomar	NEAT	·	2.5 km	MPC · JPL
559382	2015 CW_{49}	—	September 17, 2012	Mount Lemmon	Mount Lemmon Survey	EOS	1.9 km	MPC · JPL
559383	2015 CY_{50}	—	August 10, 2007	Kitt Peak	Spacewatch	·	2.2 km	MPC · JPL
559384	2015 CN_{51}	—	March 23, 2004	Kitt Peak	Spacewatch	·	2.5 km	MPC · JPL
559385	2015 CS_{51}	—	August 24, 2011	Haleakala	Pan-STARRS 1	TIR	2.7 km	MPC · JPL
559386	2015 CQ_{53}	—	December 29, 2008	Kitt Peak	Spacewatch	·	1.8 km	MPC · JPL
559387	2015 CE_{54}	—	August 28, 2006	Kitt Peak	Spacewatch	·	3.2 km	MPC · JPL
559388	2015 CH_{55}	—	January 15, 2009	Kitt Peak	Spacewatch	·	2.4 km	MPC · JPL
559389	2015 CQ_{55}	—	January 15, 2009	Kitt Peak	Spacewatch	THM	2.2 km	MPC · JPL
559390	2015 CS_{55}	—	December 11, 2013	Haleakala	Pan-STARRS 1	·	2.6 km	MPC · JPL
559391	2015 CY_{55}	—	December 31, 2008	Kitt Peak	Spacewatch	·	2.6 km	MPC · JPL
559392	2015 CH_{58}	—	February 15, 2015	Haleakala	Pan-STARRS 1	·	3.3 km	MPC · JPL
559393	2015 CL_{58}	—	July 4, 2005	Palomar	NEAT	·	4.0 km	MPC · JPL
559394	2015 CZ_{58}	—	October 24, 2003	Apache Point	SDSS Collaboration	·	1.8 km	MPC · JPL
559395	2015 CH_{60}	—	January 16, 2015	Haleakala	Pan-STARRS 1	·	2.7 km	MPC · JPL
559396	2015 CW_{60}	—	October 3, 2013	Kitt Peak	Spacewatch	·	3.0 km	MPC · JPL
559397	2015 CV_{62}	—	February 10, 2015	Mount Lemmon	Mount Lemmon Survey	·	2.7 km	MPC · JPL
559398	2015 CZ_{62}	—	January 19, 2015	Mount Lemmon	Mount Lemmon Survey	·	1.8 km	MPC · JPL
559399	2015 CB_{63}	—	February 11, 2015	Mount Lemmon	Mount Lemmon Survey	·	1.2 km	MPC · JPL
559400	2015 CK_{63}	—	January 15, 2004	Kitt Peak	Spacewatch	·	2.2 km	MPC · JPL

== 559401–559500 ==
back to top

Designation			Discovery			Properties		Ref
Permanent	Provisional	Named after	Date	Site	Discoverer(s)	Category	Diam.	Ref
559401	2015 CG_{64}	—	December 25, 2008	Bergisch Gladbach	W. Bickel	·	2.3 km	MPC · JPL
559402	2015 CQ_{65}	—	March 11, 2005	Mount Lemmon	Mount Lemmon Survey	·	2.5 km	MPC · JPL
559403	2015 CV_{65}	—	April 10, 2010	Mount Lemmon	Mount Lemmon Survey	THM	2.0 km	MPC · JPL
559404	2015 CX_{65}	—	September 11, 2007	Mount Lemmon	Mount Lemmon Survey	THM	2.2 km	MPC · JPL
559405	2015 CA_{66}	—	March 18, 2010	Mount Lemmon	Mount Lemmon Survey	·	2.6 km	MPC · JPL
559406	2015 CV_{66}	—	October 23, 2001	Palomar	NEAT	·	3.5 km	MPC · JPL
559407	2015 CN_{67}	—	November 20, 2014	Mount Lemmon	Mount Lemmon Survey	·	2.1 km	MPC · JPL
559408	2015 CB_{68}	—	February 14, 2010	Mount Lemmon	Mount Lemmon Survey	EOS	1.7 km	MPC · JPL
559409	2015 CW_{68}	—	April 8, 2010	Kitt Peak	Spacewatch	EOS	1.7 km	MPC · JPL
559410	2015 CL_{69}	—	January 23, 2015	Haleakala	Pan-STARRS 1	EOS	1.6 km	MPC · JPL
559411	2015 CT_{71}	—	February 14, 2015	Mount Lemmon	Mount Lemmon Survey	·	2.9 km	MPC · JPL
559412	2015 CC_{72}	—	February 1, 2015	Haleakala	Pan-STARRS 1	H	440 m	MPC · JPL
559413	2015 CD_{72}	—	December 31, 2008	Mount Lemmon	Mount Lemmon Survey	·	2.4 km	MPC · JPL
559414	2015 CR_{72}	—	February 12, 2015	Haleakala	Pan-STARRS 1	·	1.4 km	MPC · JPL
559415	2015 CZ_{73}	—	February 9, 2015	Mount Lemmon	Mount Lemmon Survey	·	1.9 km	MPC · JPL
559416	2015 CD_{74}	—	February 8, 2015	Mount Lemmon	Mount Lemmon Survey	EOS	1.7 km	MPC · JPL
559417	2015 DO_{2}	—	January 16, 2015	Haleakala	Pan-STARRS 1	·	2.6 km	MPC · JPL
559418	2015 DW_{2}	—	February 16, 2015	Haleakala	Pan-STARRS 1	KOR	1.0 km	MPC · JPL
559419	2015 DY_{2}	—	February 13, 2011	Mount Lemmon	Mount Lemmon Survey	·	1.6 km	MPC · JPL
559420	2015 DT_{3}	—	February 16, 2010	Mount Lemmon	Mount Lemmon Survey	·	1.2 km	MPC · JPL
559421	2015 DN_{4}	—	October 30, 2008	Kitt Peak	Spacewatch	EOS	1.6 km	MPC · JPL
559422	2015 DY_{4}	—	December 20, 2009	Kitt Peak	Spacewatch	·	1.7 km	MPC · JPL
559423	2015 DC_{5}	—	January 16, 2015	Haleakala	Pan-STARRS 1	·	1.6 km	MPC · JPL
559424	2015 DY_{6}	—	January 24, 2015	Haleakala	Pan-STARRS 1	·	1.8 km	MPC · JPL
559425	2015 DA_{7}	—	September 27, 2003	Kitt Peak	Spacewatch	KOR	1.4 km	MPC · JPL
559426	2015 DK_{7}	—	October 8, 2007	Anderson Mesa	LONEOS	·	3.6 km	MPC · JPL
559427	2015 DL_{7}	—	December 26, 2014	Haleakala	Pan-STARRS 1	·	2.0 km	MPC · JPL
559428	2015 DD_{8}	—	February 24, 2006	Kitt Peak	Spacewatch	·	2.3 km	MPC · JPL
559429	2015 DT_{8}	—	November 11, 2013	Mount Lemmon	Mount Lemmon Survey	·	2.5 km	MPC · JPL
559430	2015 DF_{9}	—	February 8, 2015	Mount Lemmon	Mount Lemmon Survey	·	1.9 km	MPC · JPL
559431	2015 DJ_{9}	—	April 10, 2005	Mount Lemmon	Mount Lemmon Survey	THM	1.9 km	MPC · JPL
559432	2015 DU_{9}	—	December 21, 2014	Mount Lemmon	Mount Lemmon Survey	EOS	1.5 km	MPC · JPL
559433	2015 DA_{10}	—	August 13, 2012	Siding Spring	SSS	·	2.5 km	MPC · JPL
559434	2015 DO_{10}	—	January 14, 2015	Haleakala	Pan-STARRS 1	EOS	1.9 km	MPC · JPL
559435	2015 DW_{11}	—	October 23, 2008	Kitt Peak	Spacewatch	·	1.5 km	MPC · JPL
559436	2015 DY_{11}	—	August 26, 2012	Haleakala	Pan-STARRS 1	·	2.3 km	MPC · JPL
559437	2015 DH_{12}	—	January 8, 2010	Kitt Peak	Spacewatch	·	1.9 km	MPC · JPL
559438	2015 DO_{12}	—	January 11, 2010	Kitt Peak	Spacewatch	EOS	1.7 km	MPC · JPL
559439	2015 DA_{13}	—	January 20, 2015	Haleakala	Pan-STARRS 1	·	1.6 km	MPC · JPL
559440	2015 DV_{13}	—	August 14, 2012	Haleakala	Pan-STARRS 1	·	2.7 km	MPC · JPL
559441	2015 DM_{14}	—	September 26, 2003	Apache Point	SDSS Collaboration	·	1.6 km	MPC · JPL
559442	2015 DP_{14}	—	October 3, 2013	Mount Lemmon	Mount Lemmon Survey	KOR	1.2 km	MPC · JPL
559443	2015 DU_{14}	—	February 16, 2010	Kitt Peak	Spacewatch	HYG	2.5 km	MPC · JPL
559444	2015 DX_{14}	—	January 14, 2015	Haleakala	Pan-STARRS 1	(16286)	1.9 km	MPC · JPL
559445	2015 DA_{15}	—	February 4, 2006	Kitt Peak	Spacewatch	HOF	2.4 km	MPC · JPL
559446	2015 DB_{15}	—	December 2, 2005	Mauna Kea	A. Boattini	KOR	1.5 km	MPC · JPL
559447	2015 DD_{17}	—	February 16, 2004	Kitt Peak	Spacewatch	·	2.3 km	MPC · JPL
559448	2015 DG_{17}	—	January 27, 2015	Haleakala	Pan-STARRS 1	·	2.1 km	MPC · JPL
559449	2015 DY_{17}	—	April 6, 2010	Mount Lemmon	Mount Lemmon Survey	·	2.6 km	MPC · JPL
559450	2015 DB_{18}	—	May 21, 2012	Haleakala	Pan-STARRS 1	·	810 m	MPC · JPL
559451	2015 DC_{18}	—	January 28, 2004	Kitt Peak	Spacewatch	·	2.5 km	MPC · JPL
559452	2015 DN_{19}	—	February 16, 2015	Haleakala	Pan-STARRS 1	·	2.8 km	MPC · JPL
559453	2015 DX_{20}	—	January 27, 2015	Haleakala	Pan-STARRS 1	·	2.6 km	MPC · JPL
559454	2015 DS_{21}	—	November 28, 2013	Mount Lemmon	Mount Lemmon Survey	·	1.5 km	MPC · JPL
559455	2015 DM_{22}	—	January 24, 2015	Mount Lemmon	Mount Lemmon Survey	·	1.8 km	MPC · JPL
559456	2015 DP_{22}	—	September 10, 2007	Mount Lemmon	Mount Lemmon Survey	T_{j} (2.98)	2.7 km	MPC · JPL
559457	2015 DO_{23}	—	November 19, 2008	Catalina	CSS	·	1.6 km	MPC · JPL
559458	2015 DS_{23}	—	August 14, 2012	Haleakala	Pan-STARRS 1	·	2.0 km	MPC · JPL
559459	2015 DE_{24}	—	February 15, 2010	Kitt Peak	Spacewatch	·	2.0 km	MPC · JPL
559460	2015 DA_{25}	—	November 9, 2013	Haleakala	Pan-STARRS 1	·	2.0 km	MPC · JPL
559461	2015 DJ_{25}	—	September 13, 2007	Saint-Sulpice	B. Christophe	·	1.8 km	MPC · JPL
559462	2015 DM_{25}	—	January 21, 2015	Haleakala	Pan-STARRS 1	·	2.1 km	MPC · JPL
559463	2015 DE_{26}	—	February 16, 2015	Haleakala	Pan-STARRS 1	·	2.8 km	MPC · JPL
559464	2015 DQ_{26}	—	January 27, 2015	Haleakala	Pan-STARRS 1	TIR	3.0 km	MPC · JPL
559465	2015 DZ_{29}	—	October 8, 2007	Mount Lemmon	Mount Lemmon Survey	·	2.6 km	MPC · JPL
559466	2015 DQ_{30}	—	March 23, 2012	Kitt Peak	Spacewatch	·	560 m	MPC · JPL
559467	2015 DZ_{30}	—	October 7, 2002	Palomar	NEAT	·	2.3 km	MPC · JPL
559468	2015 DH_{31}	—	February 16, 2015	Haleakala	Pan-STARRS 1	EOS	1.7 km	MPC · JPL
559469	2015 DF_{32}	—	September 11, 2007	Mount Lemmon	Mount Lemmon Survey	·	2.2 km	MPC · JPL
559470	2015 DZ_{32}	—	January 12, 2010	Mount Lemmon	Mount Lemmon Survey	·	1.8 km	MPC · JPL
559471	2015 DD_{33}	—	November 10, 2013	Mount Lemmon	Mount Lemmon Survey	·	1.7 km	MPC · JPL
559472	2015 DM_{33}	—	August 17, 2012	Haleakala	Pan-STARRS 1	·	2.1 km	MPC · JPL
559473	2015 DP_{34}	—	January 21, 2015	Haleakala	Pan-STARRS 1	·	2.5 km	MPC · JPL
559474	2015 DZ_{35}	—	August 17, 2012	Haleakala	Pan-STARRS 1	·	2.3 km	MPC · JPL
559475	2015 DB_{36}	—	January 17, 2004	Palomar	NEAT	EOS	1.7 km	MPC · JPL
559476	2015 DP_{36}	—	January 25, 2009	Kitt Peak	Spacewatch	VER	2.4 km	MPC · JPL
559477	2015 DU_{36}	—	February 3, 2009	Mount Lemmon	Mount Lemmon Survey	·	2.4 km	MPC · JPL
559478	2015 DF_{37}	—	February 16, 2015	Haleakala	Pan-STARRS 1	EOS	1.7 km	MPC · JPL
559479	2015 DN_{37}	—	November 26, 2013	Haleakala	Pan-STARRS 1	·	1.8 km	MPC · JPL
559480	2015 DY_{37}	—	June 22, 2011	Mount Lemmon	Mount Lemmon Survey	HYG	3.0 km	MPC · JPL
559481	2015 DG_{38}	—	November 12, 2001	Apache Point	SDSS Collaboration	·	2.7 km	MPC · JPL
559482	2015 DK_{38}	—	October 19, 2007	Kitt Peak	Spacewatch	·	2.7 km	MPC · JPL
559483	2015 DM_{39}	—	May 7, 2010	Mount Lemmon	Mount Lemmon Survey	·	2.1 km	MPC · JPL
559484	2015 DR_{39}	—	September 13, 2007	Mount Lemmon	Mount Lemmon Survey	·	2.7 km	MPC · JPL
559485	2015 DS_{39}	—	January 15, 2009	Kitt Peak	Spacewatch	·	2.3 km	MPC · JPL
559486	2015 DM_{40}	—	October 23, 2001	Palomar	NEAT	VER	2.8 km	MPC · JPL
559487	2015 DR_{40}	—	March 17, 2004	Kitt Peak	Spacewatch	·	2.5 km	MPC · JPL
559488	2015 DX_{41}	—	November 29, 2013	Mount Lemmon	Mount Lemmon Survey	·	2.1 km	MPC · JPL
559489	2015 DY_{41}	—	October 15, 2007	Kitt Peak	Spacewatch	·	2.8 km	MPC · JPL
559490	2015 DU_{42}	—	January 28, 2015	Haleakala	Pan-STARRS 1	·	3.0 km	MPC · JPL
559491	2015 DZ_{42}	—	May 13, 2005	Kitt Peak	Spacewatch	·	2.4 km	MPC · JPL
559492	2015 DD_{43}	—	January 28, 2015	Haleakala	Pan-STARRS 1	·	1.7 km	MPC · JPL
559493	2015 DF_{44}	—	January 27, 2015	Haleakala	Pan-STARRS 1	·	1.9 km	MPC · JPL
559494	2015 DH_{44}	—	November 11, 2013	Kitt Peak	Spacewatch	·	1.8 km	MPC · JPL
559495	2015 DM_{44}	—	April 14, 2010	Mount Lemmon	Mount Lemmon Survey	·	2.6 km	MPC · JPL
559496	2015 DN_{44}	—	December 22, 2008	Mount Lemmon	Mount Lemmon Survey	EOS	1.7 km	MPC · JPL
559497	2015 DH_{45}	—	February 2, 2009	Mount Lemmon	Mount Lemmon Survey	·	2.3 km	MPC · JPL
559498	2015 DS_{48}	—	January 29, 2015	Haleakala	Pan-STARRS 1	·	2.4 km	MPC · JPL
559499	2015 DB_{50}	—	September 10, 2007	Kitt Peak	Spacewatch	·	2.1 km	MPC · JPL
559500	2015 DD_{50}	—	January 30, 2009	Mount Lemmon	Mount Lemmon Survey	(1298)	2.1 km	MPC · JPL

== 559501–559600 ==
back to top

Designation			Discovery			Properties		Ref
Permanent	Provisional	Named after	Date	Site	Discoverer(s)	Category	Diam.	Ref
559501	2015 DJ_{50}	—	October 10, 2007	Kitt Peak	Spacewatch	·	2.7 km	MPC · JPL
559502	2015 DO_{50}	—	January 27, 2015	Haleakala	Pan-STARRS 1	·	1.9 km	MPC · JPL
559503	2015 DC_{51}	—	January 27, 2015	Haleakala	Pan-STARRS 1	·	2.0 km	MPC · JPL
559504	2015 DA_{52}	—	October 16, 2007	Kitt Peak	Spacewatch	·	1.7 km	MPC · JPL
559505	2015 DH_{52}	—	November 9, 2013	Mount Lemmon	Mount Lemmon Survey	·	1.8 km	MPC · JPL
559506	2015 DW_{52}	—	March 13, 2010	Mount Lemmon	Mount Lemmon Survey	·	1.8 km	MPC · JPL
559507	2015 DJ_{53}	—	April 25, 2004	Kitt Peak	Spacewatch	·	2.5 km	MPC · JPL
559508	2015 DK_{55}	—	November 12, 2013	Mount Lemmon	Mount Lemmon Survey	·	2.0 km	MPC · JPL
559509	2015 DQ_{55}	—	April 11, 2005	Kitt Peak	Spacewatch	·	1.8 km	MPC · JPL
559510	2015 DR_{57}	—	August 17, 2012	Haleakala	Pan-STARRS 1	EOS	1.4 km	MPC · JPL
559511	2015 DE_{58}	—	August 17, 2012	Haleakala	Pan-STARRS 1	·	2.0 km	MPC · JPL
559512	2015 DH_{59}	—	March 18, 2010	Mount Lemmon	Mount Lemmon Survey	EOS	1.9 km	MPC · JPL
559513	2015 DG_{60}	—	October 25, 2001	Apache Point	SDSS	VER	3.2 km	MPC · JPL
559514	2015 DP_{61}	—	September 29, 2013	Haleakala	Pan-STARRS 1	·	2.8 km	MPC · JPL
559515	2015 DR_{61}	—	January 16, 2015	Haleakala	Pan-STARRS 1	·	1.6 km	MPC · JPL
559516	2015 DN_{62}	—	February 16, 2015	Haleakala	Pan-STARRS 1	·	1.8 km	MPC · JPL
559517	2015 DT_{62}	—	October 6, 2013	Kitt Peak	Spacewatch	HYG	2.2 km	MPC · JPL
559518	2015 DK_{63}	—	January 22, 2015	Haleakala	Pan-STARRS 1	·	2.5 km	MPC · JPL
559519	2015 DK_{64}	—	September 16, 2012	Nogales	M. Schwartz, P. R. Holvorcem	·	2.8 km	MPC · JPL
559520	2015 DA_{66}	—	December 7, 2013	Kitt Peak	Spacewatch	EOS	1.7 km	MPC · JPL
559521 Sonbird	2015 DM_{66}	Sonbird	September 8, 2012	Tincana	M. Kusiak, M. Żołnowski	EOS	1.8 km	MPC · JPL
559522	2015 DW_{66}	—	January 22, 2015	Haleakala	Pan-STARRS 1	·	1.4 km	MPC · JPL
559523	2015 DS_{67}	—	January 22, 2015	Haleakala	Pan-STARRS 1	·	2.6 km	MPC · JPL
559524	2015 DH_{68}	—	November 4, 2013	Haleakala	Pan-STARRS 1	·	1.9 km	MPC · JPL
559525	2015 DS_{68}	—	February 16, 2015	Haleakala	Pan-STARRS 1	·	1.9 km	MPC · JPL
559526	2015 DU_{68}	—	October 1, 2013	Kitt Peak	Spacewatch	THM	2.0 km	MPC · JPL
559527	2015 DV_{70}	—	September 26, 2013	Mount Lemmon	Mount Lemmon Survey	·	2.6 km	MPC · JPL
559528	2015 DW_{70}	—	April 5, 2005	Mount Lemmon	Mount Lemmon Survey	·	1.6 km	MPC · JPL
559529	2015 DB_{71}	—	March 13, 2010	Mount Lemmon	Mount Lemmon Survey	THM	1.8 km	MPC · JPL
559530	2015 DH_{71}	—	November 28, 2013	Haleakala	Pan-STARRS 1	·	2.7 km	MPC · JPL
559531	2015 DU_{71}	—	February 16, 2015	Haleakala	Pan-STARRS 1	·	2.0 km	MPC · JPL
559532	2015 DQ_{72}	—	August 19, 2006	Kitt Peak	Spacewatch	·	3.1 km	MPC · JPL
559533	2015 DR_{72}	—	August 6, 2012	Haleakala	Pan-STARRS 1	·	2.4 km	MPC · JPL
559534	2015 DG_{74}	—	January 16, 2015	Haleakala	Pan-STARRS 1	·	2.5 km	MPC · JPL
559535	2015 DS_{74}	—	August 9, 2007	Kitt Peak	Spacewatch	·	2.2 km	MPC · JPL
559536	2015 DW_{74}	—	April 4, 2005	Catalina	CSS	·	2.6 km	MPC · JPL
559537	2015 DB_{75}	—	January 18, 2015	Haleakala	Pan-STARRS 1	·	2.4 km	MPC · JPL
559538	2015 DS_{75}	—	March 13, 2010	Kitt Peak	Spacewatch	·	1.9 km	MPC · JPL
559539	2015 DT_{75}	—	September 11, 2007	Mount Lemmon	Mount Lemmon Survey	·	2.1 km	MPC · JPL
559540	2015 DH_{76}	—	August 26, 2012	Haleakala	Pan-STARRS 1	·	2.5 km	MPC · JPL
559541	2015 DJ_{76}	—	October 3, 2013	Kitt Peak	Spacewatch	·	1.9 km	MPC · JPL
559542	2015 DY_{77}	—	July 21, 2006	Mount Lemmon	Mount Lemmon Survey	·	3.0 km	MPC · JPL
559543	2015 DC_{78}	—	March 25, 2010	Kitt Peak	Spacewatch	·	2.0 km	MPC · JPL
559544	2015 DL_{78}	—	January 22, 2015	Haleakala	Pan-STARRS 1	·	1.4 km	MPC · JPL
559545	2015 DD_{79}	—	January 22, 2015	Haleakala	Pan-STARRS 1	·	1.5 km	MPC · JPL
559546	2015 DX_{80}	—	September 20, 2008	Siding Spring	SSS	·	2.0 km	MPC · JPL
559547	2015 DP_{81}	—	February 16, 2015	Haleakala	Pan-STARRS 1	EOS	1.7 km	MPC · JPL
559548	2015 DX_{81}	—	October 12, 2007	Kitt Peak	Spacewatch	·	2.3 km	MPC · JPL
559549	2015 DY_{81}	—	January 27, 2015	Haleakala	Pan-STARRS 1	·	1.6 km	MPC · JPL
559550	2015 DC_{82}	—	December 7, 2013	Kitt Peak	Spacewatch	·	2.2 km	MPC · JPL
559551	2015 DD_{82}	—	September 17, 2012	Mount Lemmon	Mount Lemmon Survey	VER	2.3 km	MPC · JPL
559552	2015 DN_{85}	—	September 30, 2013	Catalina	CSS	·	2.7 km	MPC · JPL
559553	2015 DX_{85}	—	August 14, 2012	Haleakala	Pan-STARRS 1	EOS	1.8 km	MPC · JPL
559554	2015 DJ_{86}	—	June 21, 2012	Kitt Peak	Spacewatch	BRA	1.4 km	MPC · JPL
559555	2015 DL_{86}	—	February 27, 2004	Kitt Peak	Deep Ecliptic Survey	THM	2.2 km	MPC · JPL
559556	2015 DO_{86}	—	September 12, 2007	Mount Lemmon	Mount Lemmon Survey	·	1.5 km	MPC · JPL
559557	2015 DU_{86}	—	August 26, 2012	Haleakala	Pan-STARRS 1	·	2.2 km	MPC · JPL
559558	2015 DY_{86}	—	August 17, 2012	Haleakala	Pan-STARRS 1	·	1.9 km	MPC · JPL
559559	2015 DH_{89}	—	September 13, 2007	Mount Lemmon	Mount Lemmon Survey	THM	2.0 km	MPC · JPL
559560	2015 DQ_{89}	—	September 19, 2007	Kitt Peak	Spacewatch	·	3.0 km	MPC · JPL
559561	2015 DU_{89}	—	April 12, 2005	Kitt Peak	Deep Ecliptic Survey	·	2.3 km	MPC · JPL
559562	2015 DG_{90}	—	October 4, 2002	Palomar	NEAT	KOR	1.6 km	MPC · JPL
559563	2015 DX_{90}	—	January 16, 2015	Haleakala	Pan-STARRS 1	·	2.8 km	MPC · JPL
559564	2015 DV_{91}	—	September 25, 2012	Kitt Peak	Spacewatch	·	2.6 km	MPC · JPL
559565	2015 DQ_{92}	—	May 10, 2005	Bergisch Gladbach	W. Bickel	·	3.1 km	MPC · JPL
559566	2015 DA_{93}	—	January 21, 2015	Haleakala	Pan-STARRS 1	·	2.2 km	MPC · JPL
559567	2015 DR_{93}	—	January 22, 2015	Haleakala	Pan-STARRS 1	EOS	1.2 km	MPC · JPL
559568	2015 DW_{93}	—	September 14, 2007	Mount Lemmon	Mount Lemmon Survey	·	2.3 km	MPC · JPL
559569	2015 DL_{95}	—	December 7, 2013	Haleakala	Pan-STARRS 1	·	2.3 km	MPC · JPL
559570	2015 DO_{95}	—	March 15, 2004	Kitt Peak	Spacewatch	·	2.1 km	MPC · JPL
559571	2015 DR_{95}	—	January 26, 2009	Mount Lemmon	Mount Lemmon Survey	·	2.0 km	MPC · JPL
559572	2015 DN_{97}	—	January 18, 2009	Kitt Peak	Spacewatch	·	2.2 km	MPC · JPL
559573	2015 DZ_{97}	—	September 17, 2012	Mount Lemmon	Mount Lemmon Survey	·	2.8 km	MPC · JPL
559574	2015 DS_{98}	—	January 21, 2015	Haleakala	Pan-STARRS 1	·	2.5 km	MPC · JPL
559575	2015 DW_{98}	—	October 12, 2007	Mount Lemmon	Mount Lemmon Survey	·	2.9 km	MPC · JPL
559576	2015 DW_{100}	—	December 2, 2008	Mount Lemmon	Mount Lemmon Survey	EOS	1.5 km	MPC · JPL
559577	2015 DZ_{102}	—	March 29, 2011	Kitt Peak	Spacewatch	EOS	1.9 km	MPC · JPL
559578	2015 DQ_{103}	—	December 5, 2008	Kitt Peak	Spacewatch	·	2.5 km	MPC · JPL
559579	2015 DT_{103}	—	September 22, 2003	Kitt Peak	Spacewatch	·	1.9 km	MPC · JPL
559580	2015 DK_{104}	—	October 14, 2013	Mount Lemmon	Mount Lemmon Survey	·	2.6 km	MPC · JPL
559581	2015 DM_{105}	—	February 11, 2004	Palomar	NEAT	EOS	2.1 km	MPC · JPL
559582	2015 DS_{105}	—	November 9, 2013	Haleakala	Pan-STARRS 1	·	3.7 km	MPC · JPL
559583	2015 DU_{105}	—	November 1, 2013	Kitt Peak	Spacewatch	·	2.1 km	MPC · JPL
559584	2015 DJ_{106}	—	March 12, 2010	Kitt Peak	Spacewatch	·	2.9 km	MPC · JPL
559585	2015 DH_{107}	—	November 3, 2008	Mount Lemmon	Mount Lemmon Survey	·	2.1 km	MPC · JPL
559586	2015 DQ_{107}	—	October 25, 2013	Mount Lemmon	Mount Lemmon Survey	·	2.9 km	MPC · JPL
559587	2015 DR_{107}	—	October 12, 2007	Catalina	CSS	·	3.3 km	MPC · JPL
559588	2015 DZ_{107}	—	October 24, 2013	Mount Lemmon	Mount Lemmon Survey	·	2.1 km	MPC · JPL
559589	2015 DM_{108}	—	November 9, 2013	Mount Lemmon	Mount Lemmon Survey	·	1.8 km	MPC · JPL
559590	2015 DO_{108}	—	October 26, 2013	Catalina	CSS	·	2.4 km	MPC · JPL
559591	2015 DU_{108}	—	November 4, 2013	Haleakala	Pan-STARRS 1	·	2.7 km	MPC · JPL
559592	2015 DS_{109}	—	September 29, 2008	Mount Lemmon	Mount Lemmon Survey	EMA	2.5 km	MPC · JPL
559593	2015 DB_{110}	—	April 6, 2011	Mount Lemmon	Mount Lemmon Survey	TRE	2.4 km	MPC · JPL
559594	2015 DP_{110}	—	January 29, 2015	Haleakala	Pan-STARRS 1	·	2.2 km	MPC · JPL
559595	2015 DS_{110}	—	January 31, 2004	Apache Point	SDSS Collaboration	·	2.6 km	MPC · JPL
559596	2015 DJ_{111}	—	November 1, 2008	Mount Lemmon	Mount Lemmon Survey	·	3.7 km	MPC · JPL
559597	2015 DW_{111}	—	October 4, 2013	Kitt Peak	Spacewatch	EOS	1.3 km	MPC · JPL
559598	2015 DZ_{111}	—	September 12, 2007	Catalina	CSS	·	2.0 km	MPC · JPL
559599	2015 DA_{112}	—	September 14, 2013	Mount Lemmon	Mount Lemmon Survey	·	3.2 km	MPC · JPL
559600	2015 DF_{112}	—	October 26, 2001	Kitt Peak	Spacewatch	·	3.5 km	MPC · JPL

== 559601–559700 ==
back to top

Designation			Discovery			Properties		Ref
Permanent	Provisional	Named after	Date	Site	Discoverer(s)	Category	Diam.	Ref
559601	2015 DJ_{112}	—	November 1, 2013	Kitt Peak	Spacewatch	·	3.0 km	MPC · JPL
559602	2015 DQ_{112}	—	January 15, 2015	Haleakala	Pan-STARRS 1	·	2.0 km	MPC · JPL
559603	2015 DV_{112}	—	October 22, 2008	Kitt Peak	Spacewatch	·	1.9 km	MPC · JPL
559604	2015 DK_{113}	—	October 26, 2013	Mount Lemmon	Mount Lemmon Survey	EOS	1.7 km	MPC · JPL
559605	2015 DO_{113}	—	March 26, 2004	Kitt Peak	Spacewatch	·	2.9 km	MPC · JPL
559606	2015 DT_{113}	—	January 27, 2015	Haleakala	Pan-STARRS 1	·	2.2 km	MPC · JPL
559607	2015 DM_{114}	—	May 12, 2011	Mount Lemmon	Mount Lemmon Survey	·	4.3 km	MPC · JPL
559608	2015 DK_{115}	—	October 7, 2008	Mount Lemmon	Mount Lemmon Survey	·	1.6 km	MPC · JPL
559609	2015 DQ_{115}	—	January 20, 2015	Mount Lemmon	Mount Lemmon Survey	EOS	1.7 km	MPC · JPL
559610	2015 DT_{115}	—	October 30, 2013	Haleakala	Pan-STARRS 1	·	1.9 km	MPC · JPL
559611	2015 DA_{116}	—	January 18, 2004	Catalina	CSS	EOS	2.7 km	MPC · JPL
559612	2015 DH_{116}	—	January 29, 2015	Haleakala	Pan-STARRS 1	EOS	1.5 km	MPC · JPL
559613	2015 DO_{116}	—	April 15, 2010	Palomar	Palomar Transient Factory	·	3.3 km	MPC · JPL
559614	2015 DQ_{116}	—	September 10, 2007	Kitt Peak	Spacewatch	·	3.1 km	MPC · JPL
559615	2015 DV_{116}	—	October 1, 2013	Kitt Peak	Spacewatch	·	2.1 km	MPC · JPL
559616	2015 DK_{117}	—	October 6, 2013	Kitt Peak	Spacewatch	·	2.3 km	MPC · JPL
559617	2015 DQ_{117}	—	April 13, 2010	Mount Lemmon	Mount Lemmon Survey	·	2.2 km	MPC · JPL
559618	2015 DZ_{117}	—	December 4, 2007	Mount Lemmon	Mount Lemmon Survey	EOS	2.3 km	MPC · JPL
559619	2015 DG_{121}	—	October 21, 2012	Haleakala	Pan-STARRS 1	·	2.9 km	MPC · JPL
559620	2015 DS_{121}	—	November 19, 2007	Kitt Peak	Spacewatch	·	3.1 km	MPC · JPL
559621	2015 DZ_{121}	—	January 28, 2015	Haleakala	Pan-STARRS 1	·	2.2 km	MPC · JPL
559622	2015 DA_{122}	—	November 28, 2013	Mount Lemmon	Mount Lemmon Survey	·	2.4 km	MPC · JPL
559623	2015 DF_{122}	—	October 10, 2007	Kitt Peak	Spacewatch	·	2.6 km	MPC · JPL
559624	2015 DG_{122}	—	December 18, 2007	Mount Lemmon	Mount Lemmon Survey	VER	2.5 km	MPC · JPL
559625	2015 DT_{122}	—	November 9, 2007	Kitt Peak	Spacewatch	·	3.2 km	MPC · JPL
559626	2015 DW_{122}	—	December 1, 2008	Mount Lemmon	Mount Lemmon Survey	·	2.0 km	MPC · JPL
559627	2015 DF_{123}	—	February 17, 2015	Haleakala	Pan-STARRS 1	EOS	1.6 km	MPC · JPL
559628	2015 DO_{123}	—	October 8, 2012	Haleakala	Pan-STARRS 1	EOS	1.7 km	MPC · JPL
559629	2015 DQ_{123}	—	February 17, 2015	Haleakala	Pan-STARRS 1	·	2.5 km	MPC · JPL
559630	2015 DT_{123}	—	December 29, 2014	Haleakala	Pan-STARRS 1	·	3.0 km	MPC · JPL
559631	2015 DF_{124}	—	November 2, 2002	La Palma	A. Fitzsimmons	·	2.3 km	MPC · JPL
559632	2015 DJ_{124}	—	January 7, 1999	Kitt Peak	Spacewatch	EOS	1.8 km	MPC · JPL
559633	2015 DP_{124}	—	September 23, 2011	Haleakala	Pan-STARRS 1	·	4.2 km	MPC · JPL
559634	2015 DR_{124}	—	October 28, 2013	Kitt Peak	Spacewatch	·	2.5 km	MPC · JPL
559635	2015 DS_{124}	—	October 14, 2001	Apache Point	SDSS Collaboration	·	3.0 km	MPC · JPL
559636	2015 DV_{124}	—	December 29, 2014	Haleakala	Pan-STARRS 1	·	2.3 km	MPC · JPL
559637	2015 DJ_{125}	—	January 19, 2015	Haleakala	Pan-STARRS 1	·	2.9 km	MPC · JPL
559638	2015 DL_{125}	—	October 7, 2007	Mount Lemmon	Mount Lemmon Survey	TIR	2.5 km	MPC · JPL
559639	2015 DQ_{125}	—	October 17, 2012	Haleakala	Pan-STARRS 1	·	3.0 km	MPC · JPL
559640	2015 DA_{126}	—	January 21, 2015	Haleakala	Pan-STARRS 1	EOS	1.9 km	MPC · JPL
559641	2015 DM_{126}	—	April 14, 2010	Kitt Peak	Spacewatch	·	2.4 km	MPC · JPL
559642	2015 DV_{126}	—	December 31, 2013	Mount Lemmon	Mount Lemmon Survey	·	2.8 km	MPC · JPL
559643	2015 DD_{127}	—	January 28, 2015	Haleakala	Pan-STARRS 1	·	2.7 km	MPC · JPL
559644	2015 DH_{127}	—	April 9, 2010	Kitt Peak	Spacewatch	·	2.5 km	MPC · JPL
559645	2015 DP_{127}	—	November 14, 2007	Kitt Peak	Spacewatch	·	3.0 km	MPC · JPL
559646	2015 DR_{127}	—	December 16, 2007	Mount Lemmon	Mount Lemmon Survey	·	3.3 km	MPC · JPL
559647	2015 DT_{127}	—	December 29, 2014	Haleakala	Pan-STARRS 1	·	2.9 km	MPC · JPL
559648	2015 DZ_{127}	—	December 29, 2014	Haleakala	Pan-STARRS 1	·	3.0 km	MPC · JPL
559649	2015 DU_{128}	—	December 11, 2013	Mount Lemmon	Mount Lemmon Survey	VER	2.3 km	MPC · JPL
559650	2015 DH_{129}	—	January 28, 2015	Haleakala	Pan-STARRS 1	·	2.6 km	MPC · JPL
559651	2015 DL_{129}	—	October 6, 2013	Mount Lemmon	Mount Lemmon Survey	TIR	2.0 km	MPC · JPL
559652	2015 DM_{129}	—	August 1, 2011	Haleakala	Pan-STARRS 1	·	1.9 km	MPC · JPL
559653	2015 DO_{129}	—	January 28, 2015	Haleakala	Pan-STARRS 1	EOS	1.8 km	MPC · JPL
559654	2015 DN_{130}	—	November 29, 2013	Mount Lemmon	Mount Lemmon Survey	·	2.7 km	MPC · JPL
559655	2015 DP_{130}	—	November 20, 2001	Cima Ekar	ADAS	·	2.9 km	MPC · JPL
559656	2015 DB_{131}	—	December 11, 2013	Nogales	M. Schwartz, P. R. Holvorcem	·	3.0 km	MPC · JPL
559657	2015 DW_{131}	—	January 16, 2009	Kitt Peak	Spacewatch	·	2.3 km	MPC · JPL
559658	2015 DC_{132}	—	September 11, 2007	Kitt Peak	Spacewatch	·	2.3 km	MPC · JPL
559659	2015 DW_{132}	—	January 21, 2014	Mount Lemmon	Mount Lemmon Survey	·	2.7 km	MPC · JPL
559660	2015 DW_{133}	—	August 10, 2005	Siding Spring	SSS	TIR	4.6 km	MPC · JPL
559661	2015 DG_{134}	—	February 17, 2015	Haleakala	Pan-STARRS 1	·	3.4 km	MPC · JPL
559662	2015 DL_{134}	—	February 17, 2015	Haleakala	Pan-STARRS 1	·	2.9 km	MPC · JPL
559663	2015 DP_{134}	—	December 1, 2010	Mount Lemmon	Mount Lemmon Survey	L4	8.9 km	MPC · JPL
559664	2015 DL_{136}	—	November 13, 2007	Mount Lemmon	Mount Lemmon Survey	·	3.4 km	MPC · JPL
559665	2015 DW_{138}	—	January 20, 2015	Haleakala	Pan-STARRS 1	·	1.1 km	MPC · JPL
559666	2015 DO_{139}	—	October 7, 2013	Nogales	M. Schwartz, P. R. Holvorcem	EOS	2.1 km	MPC · JPL
559667	2015 DX_{139}	—	January 15, 2015	Haleakala	Pan-STARRS 1	·	1.8 km	MPC · JPL
559668	2015 DC_{140}	—	February 16, 2010	Mount Lemmon	Mount Lemmon Survey	·	1.5 km	MPC · JPL
559669	2015 DH_{140}	—	February 17, 2010	Kitt Peak	Spacewatch	EMA	3.0 km	MPC · JPL
559670	2015 DV_{140}	—	January 30, 2011	Haleakala	Pan-STARRS 1	·	1.8 km	MPC · JPL
559671	2015 DB_{141}	—	February 9, 2005	Mount Lemmon	Mount Lemmon Survey	·	2.4 km	MPC · JPL
559672	2015 DE_{141}	—	January 18, 2015	Mount Lemmon	Mount Lemmon Survey	·	2.6 km	MPC · JPL
559673	2015 DQ_{141}	—	February 16, 2002	Palomar	NEAT	H	480 m	MPC · JPL
559674	2015 DX_{141}	—	October 25, 2008	Kitt Peak	Spacewatch	EOS	1.7 km	MPC · JPL
559675	2015 DG_{142}	—	April 29, 2011	Mount Lemmon	Mount Lemmon Survey	·	2.9 km	MPC · JPL
559676	2015 DM_{142}	—	November 29, 2014	Haleakala	Pan-STARRS 1	·	2.5 km	MPC · JPL
559677	2015 DZ_{142}	—	September 13, 2007	Mount Lemmon	Mount Lemmon Survey	·	2.6 km	MPC · JPL
559678	2015 DV_{143}	—	May 8, 2005	Mount Lemmon	Mount Lemmon Survey	·	2.0 km	MPC · JPL
559679	2015 DC_{144}	—	December 23, 2014	Kitt Peak	Spacewatch	·	1.9 km	MPC · JPL
559680	2015 DJ_{144}	—	July 27, 1995	Kitt Peak	Spacewatch	·	3.8 km	MPC · JPL
559681	2015 DC_{147}	—	August 17, 2012	ESA OGS	ESA OGS	·	2.1 km	MPC · JPL
559682	2015 DN_{148}	—	January 11, 2010	Kitt Peak	Spacewatch	·	1.5 km	MPC · JPL
559683	2015 DO_{148}	—	January 18, 2015	Kitt Peak	Spacewatch	·	1.8 km	MPC · JPL
559684	2015 DC_{149}	—	November 11, 2013	Kitt Peak	Spacewatch	·	2.8 km	MPC · JPL
559685	2015 DP_{149}	—	November 29, 2014	Haleakala	Pan-STARRS 1	·	2.8 km	MPC · JPL
559686	2015 DZ_{149}	—	May 27, 2011	Kitt Peak	Spacewatch	·	2.8 km	MPC · JPL
559687	2015 DB_{151}	—	September 24, 2007	Kitt Peak	Spacewatch	·	3.0 km	MPC · JPL
559688	2015 DF_{151}	—	November 20, 2008	Kitt Peak	Spacewatch	·	3.4 km	MPC · JPL
559689	2015 DN_{151}	—	October 3, 2013	Mount Lemmon	Mount Lemmon Survey	EOS	1.9 km	MPC · JPL
559690	2015 DF_{153}	—	September 20, 2003	Palomar	NEAT	·	2.5 km	MPC · JPL
559691	2015 DG_{154}	—	October 17, 2012	Haleakala	Pan-STARRS 1	·	2.9 km	MPC · JPL
559692	2015 DH_{157}	—	November 24, 2002	Palomar	NEAT	HYG	3.4 km	MPC · JPL
559693	2015 DJ_{157}	—	April 18, 2007	Kitt Peak	Spacewatch	·	2.4 km	MPC · JPL
559694	2015 DD_{158}	—	April 10, 2005	Mount Lemmon	Mount Lemmon Survey	·	2.4 km	MPC · JPL
559695	2015 DT_{158}	—	March 15, 2010	Mount Lemmon	Mount Lemmon Survey	TIR	1.9 km	MPC · JPL
559696	2015 DC_{159}	—	November 10, 2013	Mount Lemmon	Mount Lemmon Survey	·	2.4 km	MPC · JPL
559697	2015 DN_{159}	—	October 25, 2008	Kitt Peak	Spacewatch	TEL	1.5 km	MPC · JPL
559698	2015 DB_{160}	—	September 14, 2012	Catalina	CSS	·	2.2 km	MPC · JPL
559699	2015 DD_{160}	—	November 2, 2008	Mount Lemmon	Mount Lemmon Survey	·	1.7 km	MPC · JPL
559700	2015 DK_{160}	—	March 17, 2004	Kitt Peak	Spacewatch	·	3.2 km	MPC · JPL

== 559701–559800 ==
back to top

Designation			Discovery			Properties		Ref
Permanent	Provisional	Named after	Date	Site	Discoverer(s)	Category	Diam.	Ref
559701	2015 DL_{160}	—	October 26, 2013	Kitt Peak	Spacewatch	EOS	1.6 km	MPC · JPL
559702	2015 DK_{161}	—	March 18, 2010	Mount Lemmon	Mount Lemmon Survey	·	2.4 km	MPC · JPL
559703	2015 DS_{161}	—	March 18, 2010	Kitt Peak	Spacewatch	EOS	1.6 km	MPC · JPL
559704	2015 DS_{162}	—	January 20, 2009	Catalina	CSS	·	2.4 km	MPC · JPL
559705	2015 DE_{163}	—	July 28, 2011	Haleakala	Pan-STARRS 1	·	2.9 km	MPC · JPL
559706	2015 DJ_{163}	—	February 18, 2015	Haleakala	Pan-STARRS 1	·	2.2 km	MPC · JPL
559707	2015 DX_{165}	—	February 18, 2015	Haleakala	Pan-STARRS 1	EOS	1.5 km	MPC · JPL
559708	2015 DU_{166}	—	October 15, 2007	Kitt Peak	Spacewatch	·	2.4 km	MPC · JPL
559709	2015 DB_{167}	—	September 17, 2012	Mount Lemmon	Mount Lemmon Survey	EOS	1.6 km	MPC · JPL
559710	2015 DP_{167}	—	January 21, 2015	Haleakala	Pan-STARRS 1	TEL	1.4 km	MPC · JPL
559711	2015 DW_{168}	—	January 25, 2015	Haleakala	Pan-STARRS 1	TIR	2.5 km	MPC · JPL
559712	2015 DG_{170}	—	November 19, 2008	Kitt Peak	Spacewatch	·	3.0 km	MPC · JPL
559713	2015 DX_{170}	—	October 3, 2013	Kitt Peak	Spacewatch	·	2.7 km	MPC · JPL
559714	2015 DT_{173}	—	October 16, 2012	Mount Lemmon	Mount Lemmon Survey	·	2.7 km	MPC · JPL
559715	2015 DK_{174}	—	February 19, 2015	Haleakala	Pan-STARRS 1	·	1.9 km	MPC · JPL
559716	2015 DE_{175}	—	November 28, 2013	Mount Lemmon	Mount Lemmon Survey	·	1.2 km	MPC · JPL
559717 Bródyjános	2015 DO_{175}	Bródyjános	August 31, 2011	Piszkés-tető	K. Sárneczky, S. Kürti	·	3.7 km	MPC · JPL
559718	2015 DA_{177}	—	August 20, 2001	Cerro Tololo	Deep Ecliptic Survey	·	2.7 km	MPC · JPL
559719	2015 DN_{177}	—	October 24, 2008	Kitt Peak	Spacewatch	THM	1.8 km	MPC · JPL
559720	2015 DZ_{177}	—	November 24, 2014	Mount Lemmon	Mount Lemmon Survey	·	3.5 km	MPC · JPL
559721	2015 DY_{178}	—	October 9, 2007	Catalina	CSS	·	3.1 km	MPC · JPL
559722	2015 DA_{179}	—	January 2, 2009	Mount Lemmon	Mount Lemmon Survey	·	2.7 km	MPC · JPL
559723	2015 DG_{179}	—	October 20, 2007	Mount Lemmon	Mount Lemmon Survey	·	3.0 km	MPC · JPL
559724	2015 DP_{179}	—	April 9, 2010	Mount Lemmon	Mount Lemmon Survey	·	2.7 km	MPC · JPL
559725	2015 DV_{179}	—	February 20, 2015	Haleakala	Pan-STARRS 1	·	2.1 km	MPC · JPL
559726	2015 DG_{180}	—	February 20, 2015	Haleakala	Pan-STARRS 1	·	2.0 km	MPC · JPL
559727	2015 DL_{180}	—	December 29, 2008	Kitt Peak	Spacewatch	TIR	2.1 km	MPC · JPL
559728	2015 DF_{182}	—	January 15, 2015	Haleakala	Pan-STARRS 1	·	2.6 km	MPC · JPL
559729	2015 DK_{182}	—	October 14, 2013	Kitt Peak	Spacewatch	·	2.2 km	MPC · JPL
559730	2015 DX_{182}	—	January 17, 2015	Haleakala	Pan-STARRS 1	·	2.0 km	MPC · JPL
559731	2015 DZ_{182}	—	January 17, 2015	Haleakala	Pan-STARRS 1	EOS	2.1 km	MPC · JPL
559732	2015 DL_{183}	—	July 20, 2001	Palomar	NEAT	·	2.6 km	MPC · JPL
559733	2015 DV_{183}	—	October 10, 2007	Kitt Peak	Spacewatch	·	2.6 km	MPC · JPL
559734	2015 DC_{184}	—	January 17, 2015	Haleakala	Pan-STARRS 1	·	2.6 km	MPC · JPL
559735	2015 DP_{184}	—	December 31, 2008	Kitt Peak	Spacewatch	·	2.7 km	MPC · JPL
559736	2015 DN_{185}	—	January 20, 2009	Kitt Peak	Spacewatch	VER	2.7 km	MPC · JPL
559737	2015 DW_{185}	—	November 11, 2013	Kitt Peak	Spacewatch	·	2.2 km	MPC · JPL
559738	2015 DY_{185}	—	November 3, 2007	Mount Lemmon	Mount Lemmon Survey	·	2.5 km	MPC · JPL
559739	2015 DD_{186}	—	December 7, 2013	Haleakala	Pan-STARRS 1	·	2.0 km	MPC · JPL
559740	2015 DG_{186}	—	May 24, 2011	Haleakala	Pan-STARRS 1	EOS	2.1 km	MPC · JPL
559741	2015 DO_{186}	—	November 27, 2013	Haleakala	Pan-STARRS 1	·	1.9 km	MPC · JPL
559742	2015 DT_{186}	—	November 27, 2013	Haleakala	Pan-STARRS 1	(31811)	2.5 km	MPC · JPL
559743	2015 DQ_{187}	—	October 6, 2007	Eskridge	G. Hug	·	2.5 km	MPC · JPL
559744	2015 DW_{187}	—	November 10, 1996	Kitt Peak	Spacewatch	·	2.9 km	MPC · JPL
559745	2015 DX_{187}	—	October 14, 2007	Mount Lemmon	Mount Lemmon Survey	·	2.3 km	MPC · JPL
559746	2015 DM_{188}	—	October 15, 2007	Kitt Peak	Spacewatch	·	2.2 km	MPC · JPL
559747	2015 DV_{188}	—	December 22, 2008	Kitt Peak	Spacewatch	EOS	1.6 km	MPC · JPL
559748	2015 DX_{188}	—	January 29, 2015	Haleakala	Pan-STARRS 1	ELF	3.1 km	MPC · JPL
559749	2015 DA_{189}	—	January 29, 2003	Apache Point	SDSS Collaboration	·	2.6 km	MPC · JPL
559750	2015 DC_{189}	—	October 20, 2007	Mount Lemmon	Mount Lemmon Survey	·	2.1 km	MPC · JPL
559751	2015 DE_{189}	—	January 27, 2015	Haleakala	Pan-STARRS 1	·	2.4 km	MPC · JPL
559752	2015 DQ_{189}	—	March 23, 2010	Mount Lemmon	Mount Lemmon Survey	·	2.1 km	MPC · JPL
559753	2015 DU_{189}	—	November 26, 2014	Haleakala	Pan-STARRS 1	·	4.1 km	MPC · JPL
559754	2015 DV_{189}	—	June 27, 2010	WISE	WISE	·	2.2 km	MPC · JPL
559755	2015 DG_{190}	—	May 10, 2005	Cerro Tololo	Deep Ecliptic Survey	·	4.0 km	MPC · JPL
559756	2015 DH_{190}	—	November 9, 2013	Haleakala	Pan-STARRS 1	·	1.5 km	MPC · JPL
559757	2015 DL_{190}	—	February 20, 2015	Haleakala	Pan-STARRS 1	·	2.4 km	MPC · JPL
559758	2015 DX_{190}	—	February 20, 2015	Haleakala	Pan-STARRS 1	·	2.5 km	MPC · JPL
559759	2015 DN_{191}	—	October 5, 2013	Kitt Peak	Spacewatch	·	2.4 km	MPC · JPL
559760	2015 DT_{191}	—	February 18, 2015	Mount Lemmon	Mount Lemmon Survey	TEL	1.0 km	MPC · JPL
559761	2015 DC_{192}	—	November 27, 2013	Kitt Peak	Spacewatch	EOS	1.8 km	MPC · JPL
559762	2015 DZ_{192}	—	October 27, 2008	Kitt Peak	Spacewatch	·	2.5 km	MPC · JPL
559763	2015 DD_{193}	—	May 8, 2011	Mount Lemmon	Mount Lemmon Survey	·	1.6 km	MPC · JPL
559764	2015 DA_{194}	—	March 16, 2010	Mount Lemmon	Mount Lemmon Survey	TIR	2.0 km	MPC · JPL
559765	2015 DF_{195}	—	February 18, 2010	Kitt Peak	Spacewatch	·	2.8 km	MPC · JPL
559766	2015 DL_{195}	—	October 27, 2008	Kitt Peak	Spacewatch	·	1.5 km	MPC · JPL
559767	2015 DU_{195}	—	April 2, 2005	Mount Lemmon	Mount Lemmon Survey	·	2.2 km	MPC · JPL
559768	2015 DT_{196}	—	December 16, 2007	Kitt Peak	Spacewatch	·	3.7 km	MPC · JPL
559769	2015 DK_{197}	—	February 22, 2015	Haleakala	Pan-STARRS 1	·	3.0 km	MPC · JPL
559770	2015 DK_{198}	—	November 22, 2006	Mount Lemmon	Mount Lemmon Survey	H	550 m	MPC · JPL
559771	2015 DN_{199}	—	November 26, 2011	XuYi	PMO NEO Survey Program	H	510 m	MPC · JPL
559772	2015 DO_{199}	—	February 24, 2015	Haleakala	Pan-STARRS 1	H	500 m	MPC · JPL
559773	2015 DJ_{201}	—	October 11, 2007	Mount Lemmon	Mount Lemmon Survey	·	2.5 km	MPC · JPL
559774	2015 DT_{201}	—	September 15, 2007	Mount Lemmon	Mount Lemmon Survey	·	2.1 km	MPC · JPL
559775	2015 DE_{202}	—	February 23, 2015	Haleakala	Pan-STARRS 1	·	2.3 km	MPC · JPL
559776	2015 DN_{202}	—	October 9, 2007	Kitt Peak	Spacewatch	·	2.6 km	MPC · JPL
559777	2015 DP_{202}	—	January 2, 2014	Mount Lemmon	Mount Lemmon Survey	EOS	1.6 km	MPC · JPL
559778	2015 DE_{203}	—	October 17, 2001	Palomar	NEAT	·	3.0 km	MPC · JPL
559779	2015 DP_{203}	—	October 18, 2012	Haleakala	Pan-STARRS 1	VER	2.6 km	MPC · JPL
559780	2015 DM_{204}	—	September 14, 2007	Mount Lemmon	Mount Lemmon Survey	·	2.2 km	MPC · JPL
559781	2015 DM_{207}	—	October 11, 2001	Socorro	LINEAR	·	3.1 km	MPC · JPL
559782	2015 DO_{207}	—	January 17, 2007	Kitt Peak	Spacewatch	·	990 m	MPC · JPL
559783	2015 DY_{207}	—	January 1, 2014	Haleakala	Pan-STARRS 1	·	2.8 km	MPC · JPL
559784	2015 DX_{209}	—	March 22, 2009	Catalina	CSS	·	3.4 km	MPC · JPL
559785	2015 DZ_{209}	—	November 11, 2012	Nogales	M. Schwartz, P. R. Holvorcem	(43176)	4.1 km	MPC · JPL
559786	2015 DH_{212}	—	August 10, 2007	Kitt Peak	Spacewatch	·	2.1 km	MPC · JPL
559787	2015 DG_{213}	—	February 23, 2015	Haleakala	Pan-STARRS 1	URS	3.0 km	MPC · JPL
559788	2015 DA_{214}	—	January 18, 2009	Kitt Peak	Spacewatch	·	2.5 km	MPC · JPL
559789	2015 DS_{215}	—	June 18, 2013	Haleakala	Pan-STARRS 1	H	680 m	MPC · JPL
559790	2015 DS_{216}	—	October 8, 2012	Mount Lemmon	Mount Lemmon Survey	VER	2.3 km	MPC · JPL
559791	2015 DA_{217}	—	January 17, 2004	Palomar	NEAT	EOS	2.2 km	MPC · JPL
559792	2015 DD_{217}	—	September 19, 2001	Kitt Peak	Spacewatch	·	2.5 km	MPC · JPL
559793	2015 DY_{217}	—	September 16, 2012	Nogales	M. Schwartz, P. R. Holvorcem	EOS	2.0 km	MPC · JPL
559794	2015 DJ_{218}	—	April 8, 2010	Kitt Peak	Spacewatch	·	2.5 km	MPC · JPL
559795	2015 DL_{221}	—	September 11, 2007	Mount Lemmon	Mount Lemmon Survey	THM	2.1 km	MPC · JPL
559796	2015 DW_{221}	—	October 9, 2012	Mount Lemmon	Mount Lemmon Survey	VER	2.7 km	MPC · JPL
559797	2015 DX_{221}	—	August 14, 2012	Haleakala	Pan-STARRS 1	EOS	1.8 km	MPC · JPL
559798	2015 DX_{222}	—	February 20, 2015	Haleakala	Pan-STARRS 1	·	2.2 km	MPC · JPL
559799	2015 DD_{224}	—	January 21, 2015	Mount Lemmon	Mount Lemmon Survey	·	2.4 km	MPC · JPL
559800	2015 DW_{224}	—	February 16, 2015	Haleakala	Pan-STARRS 1	SDO	198 km	MPC · JPL

== 559801–559900 ==
back to top

Designation			Discovery			Properties		Ref
Permanent	Provisional	Named after	Date	Site	Discoverer(s)	Category	Diam.	Ref
559801	2015 DX_{224}	—	February 16, 2015	Haleakala	Pan-STARRS 1	SDO	189 km	MPC · JPL
559802	2015 DE_{225}	—	March 16, 2012	Haleakala	Pan-STARRS 1	·	840 m	MPC · JPL
559803	2015 DV_{225}	—	December 6, 2011	Haleakala	Pan-STARRS 1	H	540 m	MPC · JPL
559804	2015 DF_{226}	—	February 16, 2015	Haleakala	Pan-STARRS 1	H	390 m	MPC · JPL
559805	2015 DY_{226}	—	February 16, 2015	Haleakala	Pan-STARRS 1	·	2.3 km	MPC · JPL
559806	2015 DN_{227}	—	February 19, 2015	Haleakala	Pan-STARRS 1	·	3.0 km	MPC · JPL
559807	2015 DG_{228}	—	August 23, 2011	Haleakala	Pan-STARRS 1	·	2.3 km	MPC · JPL
559808	2015 DJ_{231}	—	February 16, 2015	Haleakala	Pan-STARRS 1	·	2.1 km	MPC · JPL
559809	2015 DS_{231}	—	February 25, 2015	Haleakala	Pan-STARRS 1	·	1.9 km	MPC · JPL
559810	2015 DX_{231}	—	November 3, 2007	Mount Lemmon	Mount Lemmon Survey	·	3.4 km	MPC · JPL
559811	2015 DC_{233}	—	December 9, 2013	XuYi	PMO NEO Survey Program	·	3.2 km	MPC · JPL
559812	2015 DL_{233}	—	December 4, 2008	Kitt Peak	Spacewatch	LIX	2.4 km	MPC · JPL
559813	2015 DS_{233}	—	January 20, 2015	Haleakala	Pan-STARRS 1	·	2.3 km	MPC · JPL
559814	2015 DT_{233}	—	January 20, 2009	Mount Lemmon	Mount Lemmon Survey	·	2.1 km	MPC · JPL
559815	2015 DU_{233}	—	February 27, 2015	Haleakala	Pan-STARRS 1	·	2.6 km	MPC · JPL
559816	2015 DS_{234}	—	March 23, 2009	Calar Alto	F. Hormuth	·	3.2 km	MPC · JPL
559817	2015 DH_{235}	—	January 22, 2015	Haleakala	Pan-STARRS 1	·	1.9 km	MPC · JPL
559818	2015 DA_{236}	—	March 18, 2010	Kitt Peak	Spacewatch	·	1.9 km	MPC · JPL
559819	2015 DP_{236}	—	September 17, 2006	Kitt Peak	Spacewatch	HYG	2.9 km	MPC · JPL
559820	2015 DG_{237}	—	January 27, 2015	Haleakala	Pan-STARRS 1	·	2.5 km	MPC · JPL
559821	2015 DU_{237}	—	February 16, 2015	Haleakala	Pan-STARRS 1	EOS	1.3 km	MPC · JPL
559822	2015 DD_{238}	—	September 17, 2006	Kitt Peak	Spacewatch	EOS	1.5 km	MPC · JPL
559823	2015 DS_{238}	—	November 11, 2013	Mount Lemmon	Mount Lemmon Survey	·	2.0 km	MPC · JPL
559824	2015 DN_{239}	—	November 28, 2013	Mount Lemmon	Mount Lemmon Survey	·	2.4 km	MPC · JPL
559825	2015 DN_{240}	—	January 29, 2015	Haleakala	Pan-STARRS 1	·	2.7 km	MPC · JPL
559826	2015 DP_{240}	—	February 17, 2015	Haleakala	Pan-STARRS 1	·	2.3 km	MPC · JPL
559827	2015 DD_{241}	—	January 19, 2015	Haleakala	Pan-STARRS 1	·	2.2 km	MPC · JPL
559828	2015 DX_{241}	—	February 19, 2015	Haleakala	Pan-STARRS 1	·	2.2 km	MPC · JPL
559829	2015 DJ_{242}	—	January 19, 2015	Haleakala	Pan-STARRS 1	·	2.2 km	MPC · JPL
559830	2015 DP_{242}	—	January 17, 2015	Haleakala	Pan-STARRS 1	·	2.3 km	MPC · JPL
559831	2015 DO_{243}	—	July 31, 2011	La Sagra	OAM	TIR	3.2 km	MPC · JPL
559832	2015 DY_{243}	—	December 10, 2013	Mount Lemmon	Mount Lemmon Survey	EOS	1.7 km	MPC · JPL
559833	2015 DA_{246}	—	January 23, 2015	Haleakala	Pan-STARRS 1	·	2.7 km	MPC · JPL
559834	2015 DE_{246}	—	January 26, 2015	Haleakala	Pan-STARRS 1	·	3.3 km	MPC · JPL
559835	2015 DR_{250}	—	February 27, 2015	Haleakala	Pan-STARRS 1	·	2.1 km	MPC · JPL
559836	2015 DF_{251}	—	February 18, 2015	Haleakala	Pan-STARRS 1	·	2.9 km	MPC · JPL
559837	2015 DH_{252}	—	February 18, 2015	Haleakala	Pan-STARRS 1	EOS	1.5 km	MPC · JPL
559838	2015 DP_{252}	—	February 20, 2015	Haleakala	Pan-STARRS 1	·	2.2 km	MPC · JPL
559839	2015 DS_{252}	—	February 16, 2015	Haleakala	Pan-STARRS 1	EOS	1.3 km	MPC · JPL
559840	2015 DO_{253}	—	August 24, 2011	Siding Spring	SSS	·	2.3 km	MPC · JPL
559841	2015 DP_{253}	—	July 28, 2011	Haleakala	Pan-STARRS 1	·	2.7 km	MPC · JPL
559842	2015 DT_{253}	—	February 16, 2015	Haleakala	Pan-STARRS 1	·	1.8 km	MPC · JPL
559843	2015 DA_{263}	—	February 16, 2015	Haleakala	Pan-STARRS 1	·	2.5 km	MPC · JPL
559844	2015 DB_{263}	—	October 16, 2012	Mount Lemmon	Mount Lemmon Survey	·	2.4 km	MPC · JPL
559845	2015 DD_{263}	—	February 17, 2015	Haleakala	Pan-STARRS 1	·	2.9 km	MPC · JPL
559846	2015 DE_{263}	—	February 16, 2015	Haleakala	Pan-STARRS 1	·	2.3 km	MPC · JPL
559847	2015 DF_{263}	—	February 16, 2015	Haleakala	Pan-STARRS 1	EOS	1.6 km	MPC · JPL
559848	2015 DJ_{263}	—	February 17, 2015	Haleakala	Pan-STARRS 1	·	2.9 km	MPC · JPL
559849	2015 DM_{263}	—	February 27, 2015	Haleakala	Pan-STARRS 1	EOS	1.4 km	MPC · JPL
559850	2015 DO_{264}	—	February 16, 2015	Haleakala	Pan-STARRS 1	EOS	1.6 km	MPC · JPL
559851	2015 DR_{264}	—	February 20, 2015	Haleakala	Pan-STARRS 1	EOS	1.8 km	MPC · JPL
559852	2015 DT_{264}	—	February 20, 2015	Haleakala	Pan-STARRS 1	·	1.5 km	MPC · JPL
559853	2015 DU_{264}	—	August 22, 2012	Haleakala	Pan-STARRS 1	EOS	1.4 km	MPC · JPL
559854	2015 DV_{264}	—	September 2, 2000	Kitt Peak	Spacewatch	ELF	3.0 km	MPC · JPL
559855	2015 DA_{265}	—	February 24, 2015	Haleakala	Pan-STARRS 1	·	2.0 km	MPC · JPL
559856	2015 DE_{265}	—	February 20, 2015	Mount Lemmon	Mount Lemmon Survey	·	2.4 km	MPC · JPL
559857	2015 DN_{265}	—	August 26, 2012	Haleakala	Pan-STARRS 1	·	1.5 km	MPC · JPL
559858	2015 DP_{265}	—	February 17, 2015	Haleakala	Pan-STARRS 1	·	1.7 km	MPC · JPL
559859	2015 DS_{265}	—	February 18, 2015	Haleakala	Pan-STARRS 1	T_{j} (2.99) · EUP	3.1 km	MPC · JPL
559860	2015 DW_{265}	—	February 16, 2015	Haleakala	Pan-STARRS 1	EOS	1.4 km	MPC · JPL
559861	2015 DX_{265}	—	November 27, 2013	Mount Lemmon	Mount Lemmon Survey	·	1.6 km	MPC · JPL
559862	2015 DL_{266}	—	October 23, 2012	Haleakala	Pan-STARRS 1	·	2.4 km	MPC · JPL
559863	2015 DY_{267}	—	February 18, 2015	Haleakala	Pan-STARRS 1	TIR	2.0 km	MPC · JPL
559864	2015 DJ_{268}	—	February 20, 2015	Haleakala	Pan-STARRS 1	·	1.8 km	MPC · JPL
559865	2015 DN_{269}	—	February 23, 2015	Haleakala	Pan-STARRS 1	·	2.9 km	MPC · JPL
559866	2015 DD_{270}	—	February 24, 2015	Haleakala	Pan-STARRS 1	EOS	1.2 km	MPC · JPL
559867	2015 DF_{270}	—	February 16, 2015	Haleakala	Pan-STARRS 1	·	2.2 km	MPC · JPL
559868	2015 DO_{272}	—	February 17, 2015	Haleakala	Pan-STARRS 1	·	2.7 km	MPC · JPL
559869	2015 DP_{272}	—	February 18, 2015	Mount Lemmon	Mount Lemmon Survey	EOS	1.7 km	MPC · JPL
559870	2015 DA_{273}	—	February 24, 2015	Haleakala	Pan-STARRS 1	·	2.3 km	MPC · JPL
559871	2015 DH_{273}	—	September 25, 2012	Mount Lemmon	Mount Lemmon Survey	·	2.2 km	MPC · JPL
559872	2015 DR_{273}	—	February 16, 2015	Haleakala	Pan-STARRS 1	·	1.9 km	MPC · JPL
559873	2015 DJ_{279}	—	February 17, 2015	Haleakala	Pan-STARRS 1	·	2.3 km	MPC · JPL
559874	2015 DW_{280}	—	February 23, 2015	Haleakala	Pan-STARRS 1	·	4.1 km	MPC · JPL
559875	2015 DB_{281}	—	February 16, 2015	Haleakala	Pan-STARRS 1	·	1.8 km	MPC · JPL
559876	2015 DT_{281}	—	November 4, 2007	Mount Lemmon	Mount Lemmon Survey	·	2.1 km	MPC · JPL
559877	2015 DN_{282}	—	February 17, 2015	Haleakala	Pan-STARRS 1	·	3.7 km	MPC · JPL
559878	2015 EZ_{1}	—	January 30, 2004	Kitt Peak	Spacewatch	·	1.9 km	MPC · JPL
559879	2015 ET_{2}	—	September 3, 2000	Kitt Peak	Spacewatch	·	2.8 km	MPC · JPL
559880	2015 EV_{4}	—	February 14, 2005	Kitt Peak	Spacewatch	·	1.6 km	MPC · JPL
559881	2015 EX_{4}	—	February 16, 2015	Haleakala	Pan-STARRS 1	EOS	1.5 km	MPC · JPL
559882	2015 ED_{5}	—	October 8, 2007	Mount Lemmon	Mount Lemmon Survey	·	2.5 km	MPC · JPL
559883	2015 EK_{5}	—	April 12, 2005	Kitt Peak	Deep Ecliptic Survey	EOS	1.6 km	MPC · JPL
559884	2015 EN_{5}	—	January 15, 2015	Haleakala	Pan-STARRS 1	·	2.5 km	MPC · JPL
559885	2015 EC_{8}	—	January 21, 2015	Haleakala	Pan-STARRS 1	·	2.0 km	MPC · JPL
559886	2015 EH_{9}	—	November 29, 2013	Haleakala	Pan-STARRS 1	EOS	1.8 km	MPC · JPL
559887	2015 EJ_{10}	—	January 22, 2015	Haleakala	Pan-STARRS 1	·	2.1 km	MPC · JPL
559888	2015 ET_{10}	—	January 25, 2015	Haleakala	Pan-STARRS 1	·	2.9 km	MPC · JPL
559889	2015 EZ_{10}	—	November 26, 2014	Haleakala	Pan-STARRS 1	EOS	1.7 km	MPC · JPL
559890	2015 EG_{11}	—	January 25, 2015	Haleakala	Pan-STARRS 1	·	2.9 km	MPC · JPL
559891	2015 EU_{11}	—	February 16, 2004	Kitt Peak	Spacewatch	·	3.7 km	MPC · JPL
559892	2015 EF_{12}	—	September 22, 2007	Altschwendt	W. Ries	VER	2.1 km	MPC · JPL
559893	2015 EJ_{12}	—	August 19, 2002	Palomar	NEAT	·	2.1 km	MPC · JPL
559894	2015 EO_{12}	—	September 30, 2013	Mount Lemmon	Mount Lemmon Survey	·	2.3 km	MPC · JPL
559895	2015 ES_{13}	—	October 5, 2007	Kitt Peak	Spacewatch	·	2.6 km	MPC · JPL
559896	2015 EU_{13}	—	November 6, 2013	Haleakala	Pan-STARRS 1	·	2.9 km	MPC · JPL
559897	2015 EX_{13}	—	August 17, 2012	Haleakala	Pan-STARRS 1	·	2.6 km	MPC · JPL
559898	2015 EY_{13}	—	January 22, 2015	Haleakala	Pan-STARRS 1	EOS	1.5 km	MPC · JPL
559899	2015 EC_{14}	—	January 23, 2015	Haleakala	Pan-STARRS 1	·	2.3 km	MPC · JPL
559900	2015 EN_{14}	—	November 27, 2013	Haleakala	Pan-STARRS 1	·	2.5 km	MPC · JPL

== 559901–560000 ==
back to top

Designation			Discovery			Properties		Ref
Permanent	Provisional	Named after	Date	Site	Discoverer(s)	Category	Diam.	Ref
559901	2015 EJ_{15}	—	September 11, 2007	Kitt Peak	Spacewatch	·	2.7 km	MPC · JPL
559902	2015 EL_{16}	—	December 4, 2008	Mount Lemmon	Mount Lemmon Survey	·	2.4 km	MPC · JPL
559903	2015 EV_{16}	—	April 12, 2008	Kitt Peak	Spacewatch	·	690 m	MPC · JPL
559904	2015 EU_{17}	—	November 30, 2008	Kitt Peak	Spacewatch	·	2.1 km	MPC · JPL
559905	2015 EJ_{19}	—	January 15, 2015	Haleakala	Pan-STARRS 1	·	2.3 km	MPC · JPL
559906	2015 EZ_{19}	—	July 8, 2002	Palomar	NEAT	·	2.5 km	MPC · JPL
559907	2015 EM_{20}	—	October 11, 1996	Kitt Peak	Spacewatch	·	2.8 km	MPC · JPL
559908	2015 EA_{21}	—	November 6, 2013	Haleakala	Pan-STARRS 1	·	2.0 km	MPC · JPL
559909	2015 EH_{21}	—	August 21, 2001	Kitt Peak	Spacewatch	·	1.7 km	MPC · JPL
559910	2015 EL_{21}	—	October 26, 2013	Mount Lemmon	Mount Lemmon Survey	·	1.7 km	MPC · JPL
559911	2015 ER_{21}	—	January 31, 2004	Kitt Peak	Spacewatch	·	2.2 km	MPC · JPL
559912	2015 EY_{21}	—	September 12, 2007	Mount Lemmon	Mount Lemmon Survey	·	2.2 km	MPC · JPL
559913	2015 EV_{22}	—	November 24, 2008	Kitt Peak	Spacewatch	·	1.4 km	MPC · JPL
559914	2015 EW_{23}	—	January 16, 2015	Haleakala	Pan-STARRS 1	·	2.7 km	MPC · JPL
559915	2015 ES_{24}	—	November 10, 2013	Mount Lemmon	Mount Lemmon Survey	·	2.2 km	MPC · JPL
559916	2015 EB_{25}	—	August 25, 2012	Kitt Peak	Spacewatch	·	2.9 km	MPC · JPL
559917	2015 EG_{25}	—	February 16, 2004	Kitt Peak	Spacewatch	·	3.3 km	MPC · JPL
559918	2015 EA_{26}	—	September 12, 2007	Mount Lemmon	Mount Lemmon Survey	·	2.1 km	MPC · JPL
559919	2015 EP_{26}	—	March 14, 2015	Haleakala	Pan-STARRS 1	·	2.3 km	MPC · JPL
559920	2015 EW_{26}	—	December 7, 2013	Haleakala	Pan-STARRS 1	EOS	1.6 km	MPC · JPL
559921	2015 EF_{27}	—	October 10, 2007	Kitt Peak	Spacewatch	·	2.8 km	MPC · JPL
559922	2015 EF_{28}	—	August 26, 2012	Haleakala	Pan-STARRS 1	·	2.8 km	MPC · JPL
559923	2015 EM_{28}	—	September 13, 2007	Mount Lemmon	Mount Lemmon Survey	·	1.8 km	MPC · JPL
559924	2015 ER_{28}	—	March 19, 2010	Mount Lemmon	Mount Lemmon Survey	EOS	1.6 km	MPC · JPL
559925	2015 EB_{29}	—	January 21, 2015	Haleakala	Pan-STARRS 1	·	1.4 km	MPC · JPL
559926	2015 EO_{29}	—	January 21, 2015	Haleakala	Pan-STARRS 1	EOS	1.2 km	MPC · JPL
559927	2015 EW_{29}	—	April 2, 2005	Goodricke-Pigott	R. A. Tucker	·	2.7 km	MPC · JPL
559928	2015 EY_{29}	—	February 10, 2015	Mount Lemmon	Mount Lemmon Survey	·	2.6 km	MPC · JPL
559929	2015 EQ_{34}	—	March 14, 2015	Haleakala	Pan-STARRS 1	·	2.1 km	MPC · JPL
559930	2015 EG_{35}	—	August 26, 2012	Haleakala	Pan-STARRS 1	·	2.5 km	MPC · JPL
559931	2015 EF_{36}	—	September 17, 2012	Mount Lemmon	Mount Lemmon Survey	·	2.0 km	MPC · JPL
559932	2015 EY_{36}	—	March 14, 2015	Haleakala	Pan-STARRS 1	·	2.5 km	MPC · JPL
559933	2015 EZ_{36}	—	February 16, 2015	Haleakala	Pan-STARRS 1	·	2.0 km	MPC · JPL
559934	2015 EA_{37}	—	August 23, 2001	Kitt Peak	Spacewatch	·	2.5 km	MPC · JPL
559935	2015 ER_{37}	—	January 22, 2015	Haleakala	Pan-STARRS 1	EOS	1.5 km	MPC · JPL
559936	2015 EZ_{37}	—	September 12, 2007	Mount Lemmon	Mount Lemmon Survey	·	2.5 km	MPC · JPL
559937	2015 EG_{38}	—	September 11, 2007	Kitt Peak	Spacewatch	·	1.7 km	MPC · JPL
559938	2015 EL_{38}	—	October 23, 2008	Mount Lemmon	Mount Lemmon Survey	·	1.6 km	MPC · JPL
559939	2015 EV_{39}	—	October 18, 2007	Kitt Peak	Spacewatch	·	2.4 km	MPC · JPL
559940	2015 EF_{40}	—	January 29, 2015	Haleakala	Pan-STARRS 1	·	2.1 km	MPC · JPL
559941	2015 EN_{40}	—	August 17, 2012	Haleakala	Pan-STARRS 1	KOR	1.3 km	MPC · JPL
559942	2015 EY_{41}	—	January 16, 2015	Haleakala	Pan-STARRS 1	·	2.4 km	MPC · JPL
559943	2015 EB_{42}	—	March 14, 2015	Haleakala	Pan-STARRS 1	·	1.8 km	MPC · JPL
559944	2015 EN_{42}	—	August 26, 2001	Kitt Peak	Spacewatch	·	2.7 km	MPC · JPL
559945	2015 EY_{42}	—	October 8, 2007	Mount Lemmon	Mount Lemmon Survey	EOS	1.6 km	MPC · JPL
559946	2015 ES_{45}	—	August 29, 2006	Kitt Peak	Spacewatch	·	2.6 km	MPC · JPL
559947	2015 EA_{46}	—	September 14, 2007	Mount Lemmon	Mount Lemmon Survey	·	1.9 km	MPC · JPL
559948	2015 EV_{46}	—	September 24, 2012	Kitt Peak	Spacewatch	EOS	1.7 km	MPC · JPL
559949	2015 EY_{47}	—	August 26, 2012	Haleakala	Pan-STARRS 1	EOS	1.6 km	MPC · JPL
559950	2015 EE_{48}	—	December 31, 2008	Kitt Peak	Spacewatch	·	3.0 km	MPC · JPL
559951	2015 EB_{49}	—	September 19, 2003	Kitt Peak	Spacewatch	·	2.2 km	MPC · JPL
559952	2015 EH_{50}	—	August 13, 2012	Haleakala	Pan-STARRS 1	·	2.5 km	MPC · JPL
559953	2015 EF_{51}	—	September 14, 2007	Kitt Peak	Spacewatch	·	2.0 km	MPC · JPL
559954	2015 EN_{51}	—	January 21, 2015	Haleakala	Pan-STARRS 1	·	2.3 km	MPC · JPL
559955	2015 EX_{51}	—	December 27, 2013	Mount Lemmon	Mount Lemmon Survey	·	2.4 km	MPC · JPL
559956	2015 EP_{52}	—	November 9, 2013	Haleakala	Pan-STARRS 1	·	2.1 km	MPC · JPL
559957	2015 EV_{52}	—	January 21, 2015	Haleakala	Pan-STARRS 1	EOS	1.5 km	MPC · JPL
559958	2015 EG_{53}	—	September 15, 2006	Kitt Peak	Spacewatch	URS	3.5 km	MPC · JPL
559959	2015 EV_{53}	—	December 22, 2008	Mount Lemmon	Mount Lemmon Survey	·	2.8 km	MPC · JPL
559960	2015 EJ_{54}	—	April 24, 2000	Kitt Peak	Spacewatch	·	1.6 km	MPC · JPL
559961	2015 EP_{54}	—	March 29, 2004	Kitt Peak	Spacewatch	·	3.1 km	MPC · JPL
559962	2015 EC_{55}	—	February 15, 2015	Haleakala	Pan-STARRS 1	·	2.8 km	MPC · JPL
559963	2015 EF_{55}	—	November 28, 2013	Haleakala	Pan-STARRS 1	EOS	1.4 km	MPC · JPL
559964	2015 ED_{56}	—	November 2, 2013	Kitt Peak	Spacewatch	·	1.6 km	MPC · JPL
559965	2015 EH_{56}	—	September 22, 2003	Kitt Peak	Spacewatch	·	2.2 km	MPC · JPL
559966	2015 EQ_{56}	—	September 11, 2007	Kitt Peak	Spacewatch	URS	2.5 km	MPC · JPL
559967	2015 ER_{56}	—	January 24, 2015	Haleakala	Pan-STARRS 1	·	2.4 km	MPC · JPL
559968	2015 EG_{58}	—	December 19, 2007	Mount Lemmon	Mount Lemmon Survey	·	4.0 km	MPC · JPL
559969	2015 ES_{58}	—	November 28, 2013	Catalina	CSS	·	2.4 km	MPC · JPL
559970	2015 EC_{59}	—	January 20, 2015	Mount Lemmon	Mount Lemmon Survey	·	1.5 km	MPC · JPL
559971	2015 EK_{64}	—	March 10, 2015	Kitt Peak	Spacewatch	·	4.0 km	MPC · JPL
559972	2015 EV_{66}	—	September 15, 2007	Lulin	LUSS	EOS	1.8 km	MPC · JPL
559973	2015 EX_{66}	—	September 11, 2002	Palomar	NEAT	·	2.2 km	MPC · JPL
559974	2015 EZ_{67}	—	February 17, 2015	Haleakala	Pan-STARRS 1	·	2.2 km	MPC · JPL
559975	2015 EB_{68}	—	August 21, 2001	Kitt Peak	Spacewatch	·	2.3 km	MPC · JPL
559976	2015 ER_{69}	—	August 27, 2001	Kitt Peak	Spacewatch	EOS	2.0 km	MPC · JPL
559977	2015 ET_{69}	—	January 21, 2015	Haleakala	Pan-STARRS 1	·	1.9 km	MPC · JPL
559978	2015 EU_{69}	—	August 14, 2012	Haleakala	Pan-STARRS 1	·	2.3 km	MPC · JPL
559979	2015 EH_{71}	—	August 13, 2012	Haleakala	Pan-STARRS 1	·	2.3 km	MPC · JPL
559980	2015 ED_{72}	—	September 18, 2001	Anderson Mesa	LONEOS	·	2.9 km	MPC · JPL
559981	2015 ET_{72}	—	March 16, 2004	Kitt Peak	Spacewatch	TIR	2.7 km	MPC · JPL
559982	2015 EH_{73}	—	August 26, 2012	Haleakala	Pan-STARRS 1	·	2.2 km	MPC · JPL
559983	2015 EU_{73}	—	December 30, 2008	Mount Lemmon	Mount Lemmon Survey	·	3.6 km	MPC · JPL
559984	2015 EW_{75}	—	March 11, 2015	Mount Lemmon	Mount Lemmon Survey	·	2.2 km	MPC · JPL
559985	2015 EE_{76}	—	March 15, 2015	Haleakala	Pan-STARRS 1	·	2.4 km	MPC · JPL
559986	2015 EW_{76}	—	March 15, 2015	Haleakala	Pan-STARRS 1	·	2.8 km	MPC · JPL
559987	2015 EB_{77}	—	March 15, 2015	Haleakala	Pan-STARRS 1	·	2.7 km	MPC · JPL
559988	2015 FZ	—	February 11, 2004	Kitt Peak	Spacewatch	·	3.4 km	MPC · JPL
559989	2015 FG_{1}	—	January 12, 2015	Haleakala	Pan-STARRS 1	T_{j} (2.94)	3.6 km	MPC · JPL
559990	2015 FU_{1}	—	February 18, 2010	Mount Lemmon	Mount Lemmon Survey	·	2.9 km	MPC · JPL
559991	2015 FE_{2}	—	December 29, 2008	Kitt Peak	Spacewatch	·	2.7 km	MPC · JPL
559992	2015 FO_{2}	—	November 27, 2009	Mount Lemmon	Mount Lemmon Survey	·	2.5 km	MPC · JPL
559993	2015 FU_{2}	—	November 9, 2013	Haleakala	Pan-STARRS 1	·	2.2 km	MPC · JPL
559994	2015 FX_{2}	—	November 10, 2013	Oukaïmeden	C. Rinner	EOS	2.0 km	MPC · JPL
559995	2015 FO_{3}	—	November 21, 2014	Haleakala	Pan-STARRS 1	·	2.1 km	MPC · JPL
559996	2015 FM_{4}	—	January 27, 2015	Haleakala	Pan-STARRS 1	·	2.3 km	MPC · JPL
559997	2015 FO_{4}	—	October 3, 2013	Haleakala	Pan-STARRS 1	·	3.3 km	MPC · JPL
559998	2015 FU_{4}	—	April 7, 2005	Kitt Peak	Spacewatch	EOS	1.7 km	MPC · JPL
559999	2015 FV_{6}	—	April 6, 2011	Mount Lemmon	Mount Lemmon Survey	·	1.6 km	MPC · JPL
560000	2015 FG_{7}	—	January 22, 2015	Haleakala	Pan-STARRS 1	·	2.6 km	MPC · JPL

back to top

== Meaning of names ==
As minor planet discoveries are confirmed, they are given a permanent number by the IAU's Minor Planet Center (MPC), and the discoverers can then submit names for them, following the IAU's naming conventions. The list below concerns those minor planets in the specified number-range that have received names, and explains the meanings of those names.

Official naming citations of newly named small Solar System bodies are approved and published in a bulletin by IAU's Working Group for Small Bodies Nomenclature (WGSBN). Before May 2021, citations were published in MPC's Minor Planet Circulars for many decades. Recent citations can also be found on the JPL Small-Body Database (SBDB). Until his death in 2016, German astronomer Lutz D. Schmadel compiled these citations into the Dictionary of Minor Planet Names (DMP) and regularly updated the collection.

Based on Paul Herget's The Names of the Minor Planets, Schmadel also researched the unclear origin of numerous asteroids, most of which had been named prior to World War II. This article incorporates text from this source, which is in the public domain: SBDB New namings may only be added to this list below after official publication as the preannouncement of names is condemned. The WGSBN publishes a comprehensive guideline for the naming rules of non-cometary small Solar System bodies.

Named minor planet	Provisional	This minor planet was named for...	Ref · Catalog
559135 Richardgreaves	2015 BB_{474}	Richard Greaves (b. 1967), an English commercial property consultant.	IAU · 559135
559521 Sonbird	2015 DM_{66}	Sonbird is an indie-rock music band from Żywiec in Poland.	IAU · 559521
559717 Bródyjános	2015 DO_{175}	János Bródy, Hungarian singer songwriter and lyricist whose poetic, metaphor rich texts and subtle hidden messages made him a defining voice of Hungary’s beat era.	IAU · 559717
